= 1988 Spanish Open – Singles =

Singles
- 1988 Spanish Open

Final
- Champion: (Brazil) Neige Dias
- Runner-up: (Argentina) Bettina Fulco
- Score: 6–3, 6–3

Details
- Draw: 32
- Seeds: 8

Events
Singles	Doubles
← 1986 ·	Spanish Open	· 1989 →

Neige Dias won in the final 6–3, 6–3 against Bettina Fulco.

== Seeds ==
A champion seed is indicated in bold text while text in italics indicates the round in which that seed was eliminated.

1. (West Germany) Sylvia Hanika (quarterfinals)
2. (Spain) Arantxa Sánchez (semifinals)
3. (Argentina) Bettina Fulco (final)
4. (Argentina) Mariana Pérez-Roldán (semifinals)
5. (Brazil) **Neige Dias (champion)**
6. n/a
7. (Belgium) Sandra Wasserman (quarterfinals)
8. (Czechoslovakia) Iva Budařová (first round)

== Draw ==
=== Key ===
- Q = Qualifier
- WC = Wild card
- LL = Lucky loser
- Alt = Alternate
- SE = Special exempt
- PR = Protected ranking
- ITF = ITF entry
- JE = Junior exempt
- w/o = Walkover
- r = Retired
- d = Defaulted
- SR = Special ranking

First round
1	(West Germany) **S Hanika**	3	**6**	**6**
Q	(Sweden) A-K Olsson	**6**	3	4
(Netherlands) **S Schilder**	**6**	**6**
Q	(Netherlands) N Rooimans	4	2
(France) **M-C Calleja**	6	**6**	**6**
Q	(Spain) R Bielsa	**7**	4	4
(United States) E Raponi-Longo	0	4
5	(Brazil) **N Dias**	**6**	**6**
4	(Argentina) **M Pérez-Roldán**	2	**6**	**6**
(Switzerland) C Cohen	**6**	4	2
(United Kingdom) **J Salmon**	6	**7**	**6**
(Sweden) H Dahlström	**7**	5	4
LL	(Argentina) A Tiezzi	4	1
(France) **S Niox-Chateau**	**6**	**6**
(Spain) M J Llorca	**6**	1	4
7	(Belgium) **S Wasserman**	4	**6**	**6**
8	(Czechoslovakia) I Budařová	4	1
(Denmark) **T Scheuer-Larsen**	**6**	**6**
(Brazil) **P Medrado**	5	**6**	**6**
(United Kingdom) C Wood	**7**	4	0
Q	(Argentina) G Castro	**6**	4	4
(Spain) **I Varas**	4	**6**	**6**
(United States) V Nelson-Dunbar	3	3
3	(Argentina) **B Fulco**	**6**	**6**
LL	(France) **K Quentrec**	**6**	**6**
(United Kingdom) T Catlin	0	2
(Argentina) A Villagrán	2	1
(Italy) **B Romanò**	**6**	**6**
(Spain) J Souto	3	4
(Switzerland) **C Jolissaint**	**6**	**6**
(South Africa) K Labuschagne
2	(Spain) **A Sánchez**	**w/o**

Second round
1	(West Germany) **S Hanika**	**6**	**6**
(Netherlands) S Schilder	1	1
(France) M-C Calleja	2	0
5	(Brazil) **N Dias**	**6**	**6**
4	(Argentina) **M Pérez-Roldán**	**6**	**6**
(United Kingdom) J Salmon	3	3
(France) S Niox-Chateau	1	**6**	6
7	(Belgium) **S Wasserman**	**6**	2	**7**
(Denmark) T Scheuer-Larsen	2	1
(Brazil) **P Medrado**	**6**	**6**
(Spain) I Varas	1	4
3	(Argentina) **B Fulco**	**6**	**6**
LL	(France) K Quentrec	3	3
(Italy) **B Romanò**	**6**	**6**
(Switzerland) C Jolissaint	1	4
2	(Spain) **A Sánchez**	**6**	**6**

Quarterfinals
1	(West Germany) S Hanika	**6**	4	4
5	(Brazil) **N Dias**	3	**6**	**6**
4	(Argentina) **M Pérez-Roldán**	3	**7**	**6**
7	(Belgium) S Wasserman	**6**	5	3
(Brazil) P Medrado	**6**	4	3
3	(Argentina) **B Fulco**	3	**6**	**6**
(Italy) B Romanò	1	1
2	(Spain) **A Sánchez**	**6**	**6**

Semifinals
5	(Brazil) **N Dias**	**7**	**6**
4	(Argentina) M Pérez-Roldán	6	3
3	(Argentina) **B Fulco**	1	**6**	**6**
2	(Spain) A Sánchez	**6**	2	3

Final
5	(Brazil) **Niege Dias**	**6**	**6**
3	(Argentina) Bettina Fulco	3	3
