= 1988 Spanish Open – Doubles =

Doubles
- 1988 Spanish Open

Final
- Champions: (Czechoslovakia) Iva Budařová (Belgium) Sandra Wasserman
- Runners-up: (Sweden) Anna-Karin Olsson (Spain) María José Llorca
- Score: 1–6, 6–3, 6–2

Details
- Draw: 16
- Seeds: 4

Events
Singles	Doubles
← 1986 ·	Spanish Open	· 1989 →

Iva Budařová and Sandra Wasserman won in the final 1–6, 6–3, 6–2 against Anna-Karin Olsson and María José Llorca.

== Seeds ==
Champion seeds are indicated in bold text while text in italics indicates the round in which those seeds were eliminated.

1. (Argentina) Bettina Fulco / (Spain) Arantxa Sánchez (quarterfinals)
2. (United States) Emilse Raponi-Longo / (Brazil) Patricia Medrado (quarterfinals)
3. (Argentina) Andrea Tiezzi / (Argentina) Adriana Villagrán (first round)
4. (Switzerland) Céline Cohen / (Argentina) Mariana Pérez-Roldán (quarterfinals)

== Draw ==
=== Key ===
- Q = Qualifier
- WC = Wild card
- LL = Lucky loser
- Alt = Alternate
- SE = Special exempt
- PR = Protected ranking
- ITF = ITF entry
- JE = Junior exempt
- w/o = Walkover
- r = Retired
- d = Defaulted
- SR = Special ranking

First round
1	(Argentina) **B Fulco** (Spain) **A Sánchez**	**w/o**
(Netherlands) S Schilder (United Kingdom) C Wood
(Sweden) H Dahlström (Sweden) M Strandlund	3	4
(Sweden) **A-K Olsson** (Spain) **M J Llorca**	**6**	**6**
4	(Switzerland) **C Cohen** (Argentina) **M Pérez-Roldán**	**6**	**6**
(France) I Crudo (France) V Paquet	2	1
(South Africa) K Labuschagne (United States) V Nelson-Dunbar
(United Kingdom) **T Catlin** (United States) **J Joseph**	**w/o**
(Argentina) G Castro (Spain) A Segura	4	3
(Spain) **M Vaquero** (Spain) **I Varas**	**6**	**6**
(Spain) **J Souto** (Spain) **N Souto**	**7**	**6**
3	(Argentina) A Tiezzi (Argentina) A Villagrán	6	1
(Spain) R Bielsa (Spain) E Guerra	5	6
(Czechoslovakia) **I Budařová** (Belgium) **S Wasserman**	**7**	**7**
(Netherlands) M Rooimans (Netherlands) N Rooimans	2	4
2	(United States) **E Raponi-Longo** (Brazil) **P Medrado**	**6**	**6**

Quarterfinals
1	(Argentina) B Fulco (Spain) A Sánchez	5	1
(Sweden) **A-K Olsson** (Spain) **M J Llorca**	**7**	**6**
4	(Switzerland) C Cohen (Argentina) M Pérez-Roldán	4	4
(United Kingdom) **T Catlin** (United States) **J Joseph**	**6**	**6**
(Spain) M Vaquero (Spain) I Varas	4	**7**	4
(Spain) **J Souto** (Spain) **N Souto**	**6**	5	**6**
(Czechoslovakia) **I Budařová** (Belgium) **S Wasserman**	**6**	**6**
2	(United States) E Raponi-Longo (Brazil) P Medrado	4	1

Semifinals
(Sweden) **A-K Olsson** (Spain) **M J Llorca**	**6**	4	**6**
(United Kingdom) T Catlin (United States) J Joseph	3	**6**	3
(Spain) J Souto (Spain) N Souto	**7**	6	1
(Czechoslovakia) **I Budařová** (Belgium) **S Wasserman**	6	**7**	**6**

Final
(Sweden) Anna-Karin Olsson (Spain) María José Llorca	**6**	3	2
(Czechoslovakia) **Iva Budařová** (Belgium) **Sandra Wasserman**	1	**6**	**6**
