= 1986 Brazilian Open – Singles =

Singles
- 1986 Brazilian Open

Final
- Champion: (United States) Vicki Nelson-Dunbar
- Runner-up: (United States) Jenny Klitch
- Score: 6–2, 7–6^{(7–1)}

Details
- Draw: 56
- Seeds: 14

Events
Singles	Doubles
- WTA Brasil Open

Mercedes Paz was the defending champion, but did not compete this year.

Vicki Nelson-Dunbar won the title by defeating Jenny Klitch 6–2, 7–6^{(7–1)} in the final.

== Seeds ==
The first eight seeds received a bye to the second round.

1. (Peru) Laura Gildemeister (second round)
2. (Austria) Petra Huber (third round)
3. (Brazil) Niege Dias (third round)
4. (Brazil) Patricia Medrado (second round)
5. (Argentina) Mariana Pérez Roldán (second round)
6. (West Germany) Isabel Cueto (third round)
7. (Argentina) Adriana Villagrán (quarterfinals)
8. (United States) Vicki Nelson-Dunbar (champion)
9. (Argentina) Bettina Fulco (second round)
10. (Italy) Federica Bonsignori (first round)
11. (Spain) Arantxa Sánchez Vicario (quarterfinals)
12. (Argentina) Patricia Tarabini (second round)
13. (Netherlands) Nicole Jagerman (quarterfinals)
14. (West Germany) Myriam Schropp (first round)

== Draw ==
Key

- Q = Qualifier
- WC = Wild card
- LL = Lucky loser
- Alt = Alternate
- ITF = ITF entry
- PR = Protected ranking
- SR = Special ranking
- SE = Special exempt
- JE = Junior exempt
- JR = Junior Accelerator Programme entrant
- CO = College Accelerator Programme entrant
- NG = Next Gen Accelerator Program entrant
- w/o = Walkover
- r = Retired
- d = Defaulted

=== Finals ===
Quarterfinals
13	(Netherlands) Nicole Jagerman	2	0
(United States) Kathrin Keil	6	6
(United States) Jenny Klitch	6	6
7	(Argentina) Adriana Villagrán	2	1
(United States) Amy Schwartz	6	6
11	(Spain) Arantxa Sánchez Vicario	4	1
8	(United States) Vicki Nelson-Dunbar	7	6
(Italy) Caterina Nozzoli	5	2

Semifinals
(United States) Kathrin Keil	1	6	3
(United States) Jenny Klitch	6	4	6
(United States) Amy Schwartz	4	3
8	(United States) Vicki Nelson-Dunbar	6	6

Final
(United States) Jenny Klitch	2	6^{1}
8	(United States) Vicki Nelson-Dunbar	6	7^{7}

=== Top half ===
==== Section 1 ====
First round
(Argentina) N Marcucci	4	1
(Italy) S La Fratta	6	6
(Austria) B Paulus	7	6
(Sweden) M Lindström	6	0
(Austria) B Reinstadler	2	2
13	(Netherlands) N Jagerman	6	6
(United States) K Keil	6	6
(West Germany) S Hack	1	4
(United States) P Jung	6	2	4
(Italy) P Murgo	2	6	6
(Austria) K Oberleitner	3	3
(Czechoslovakia) M Pazderová	6	6

Second round
1	(Peru) L Gildemeister	4	4
(Italy) S La Fratta	6	6
(Austria) B Paulus	1	1
13	(Netherlands) N Jagerman	6	6
(United States) K Keil	6	6
(Italy) P Murgo	1	1
(Czechoslovakia) M Pazderová	3	6	0
8	(West Germany) I Cueto	6	2	6

Third round
(Italy) S La Fratta	6^{5}	4
13	(Netherlands) N Jagerman	7^{7}	6
(United States) K Keil	6	7^{7}
8	(West Germany) I Cueto	2	6^{1}

Quarterfinals
13	(Netherlands) N Jagerman	2	0
(United States) K Keil	6	6

==== Section 2 ====
First round
(Peru) P Vásquez	6	1	5
(United States) J Klitch	3	6	7
(United States) L Allen	1	6	6
(France) P Etchemendy	6	4	0
(United States) K Copeland	2	1
12	(Argentina) P Tarabini	6	6
9	(Argentina) B Fulco	6^{7}	6	6
(Mexico) X Escobedo	7^{9}	1	0
(Netherlands) M Bollegraf	5	6	3
(United States) H Manset	7	1	6
(Sweden) K Karlsson	6	6
(Brazil) Renata Della	2	0

Second round
4	(Brazil) P Medrado	7^{7}	6^{6}	3
(United States) J Klitch	6^{2}	7^{8}	6
(United States) L Allen	3	6	7
12	(Argentina) P Tarabini	6	4	5
9	(Argentina) B Fulco	4	5
(United States) H Manset	6	7
(Sweden) K Karlsson	6	1	5
7	(Argentina) A Villagrán	4	6	7

Third round
(United States) J Klitch	6	1	6
(United States) L Allen	1	6	3
(United States) H Manset	4	1
7	(Argentina) A Villagrán	6	6

Quarterfinals
(United States) J Klitch	6	6
7	(Argentina) A Villagrán	2	1

=== Bottom half ===
==== Section 3 ====
First round
(West Germany) M Gartner	2	4
(Italy) L Golarsa	6	6
(Brazil) L Corsato	6	6
(United States) Jan Blackstad	0	3
(United States) A Schwartz	6	6
10	(Italy) F Bonsignori	2	3
11	(Spain) A Sánchez Vicario	6	6
(Austria) B Diesner	1	4
(Brazil) L Tella	7	6
(United States) R Daniels	5	2
(United States) E Rapponi-Longo	4	0
(United States) S Rimes	6	6

Second round
5	(Argentina) M Pérez Roldán	2	3
(Italy) L Golarsa	6	6
(Brazil) L Corsato	4	4
(United States) A Schwartz	6	6
11	(Spain) A Sánchez Vicario	5	6	6
(Brazil) L Tella	7	2	3
(United States) S Rimes	6	2	5
3	(Brazil) N Dias	3	6	7

Third round
(Italy) L Golarsa	2	4
(United States) A Schwartz	6	6
11	(Spain) A Sánchez Vicario	6	7
3	(Brazil) N Dias	2	5

Quarterfinals
(United States) A Schwartz	6	6
11	(Spain) A Sánchez Vicario	4	1

==== Section 4 ====
First round
(Brazil) A Vieira	3	6	5
(United Kingdom) L Pennington	6	2	7
(Netherlands) N Schutte	5	1
(United States) J Golder	7	6
(Netherlands) H ter Riet	6	6
(Argentina) A Tiezzi	3	4
14	(West Germany) M Schropp	2	1
(Brazil) G Miró	6	6
(Italy) C Nozzoli	6	6
(United States) G Falkenberg	1	0
(Italy) L Jachia	4	6	6
(Argentina) G Mosca	6	2	3

Second round
8	(United States) V Nelson-Dunbar	6	6
(United Kingdom) L Pennington	1	2
(United States) J Golder	6	7^{7}
(Netherlands) H ter Riet	2	6^{5}
(Brazil) G Miró	6^{6}	0
(Italy) C Nozzoli	7^{8}	6
(Italy) L Jachia	3	6	3
2	(Austria) P Huber	6	4	6

Third round
8	(United States) V Nelson-Dunbar	7	6
(United States) J Golder	5	3
(Italy) C Nozzoli	3	6	6
2	(Austria) P Huber	6	2	3

Quarterfinals
8	(United States) V Nelson-Dunbar	7	6
(Italy) C Nozzoli	5	2
