= 1986 Brazilian Open – Doubles =

Doubles
- 1986 Brazilian Open

Final
- Champions: (Brazil) Niege Dias (Brazil) Patricia Medrado
- Runners-up: (Peru) Laura Gildemeister (Austria) Petra Huber
- Score: 4–6, 6–4, 7–6^{(8–6)}

Details
- Draw: 24
- Seeds: 8

Events
| Singles | Doubles |
- WTA Brasil Open

Mercedes Paz and Gabriela Sabatini were the defending champions, but none competed this year.

Niege Dias and Patricia Medrado won the title by defeating Laura Gildemeister and Petra Huber 4–6, 6–4, 7–6^{(8–6)} in the final.

== Seeds ==
The first four seeds received a bye to the second round.

1. (Peru) Laura Gildemeister / (Austria) Petra Huber (final)
2. (Brazil) Niege Dias / (Brazil) Patricia Medrado (champions)
3. (Netherlands) Manon Bollegraf / (Netherlands) Nicole Jagerman (semifinals)
4. (West Germany) Isabel Cueto / (Spain) Arantxa Sánchez Vicario (quarterfinals)
5. (United States) Leslie Allen / (Argentina) Adriana Villagrán (semifinals)
6. (United States) Emilse Rapponi-Longo / (Argentina) Patricia Tarabini (quarterfinals)
7. (Sweden) Maria Lindström / (Peru) Pilar Vásquez (second round, withdrew)
8. (Italy) Lorenza Jachia / (Italy) Silvia La Fratta (second round)

== Draw ==
Key

- Q = Qualifier
- WC = Wild card
- LL = Lucky loser
- Alt = Alternate
- ITF = ITF entry
- PR = Protected ranking
- SR = Special ranking
- SE = Special exempt
- JE = Junior exempt
- JR = Junior Accelerator Programme entrant
- CO = College Accelerator Programme entrant
- NG = Next Gen Accelerator Program entrant
- w/o = Walkover
- r = Retired
- d = Defaulted

=== Finals ===
Semifinals
1 | (Peru) Laura Gildemeister (Austria) Petra Huber | 5 | 6 | 6
5 | (United States) Leslie Allen (Argentina) Adriana Villagrán | 7 | 3 | 0
3 | (Netherlands) Manon Bollegraf (Netherlands) Nicole Jagerman
2 | (Brazil) Niege Dias (Brazil) Patricia Medrado | w/o

Final
1 | (Peru) Laura Gildemeister (Austria) Petra Huber | 6 | 4 | 6^{6}
2 | (Brazil) Niege Dias (Brazil) Patricia Medrado | 4 | 6 | 7^{8}

=== Top half ===
First round
(Brazil) L Corsato-Owsianka (United States) A Schwartz | 6 | 7
(France) P Etchemendy (Netherlands) N Schutte | 2 | 5
(Italy) F Bonsignori (Netherlands) H ter Riet | 7 | 7^{7}
(United States) J Klitch (United States) H Manset | 5 | 6^{3}
(Argentina) M Pérez Roldán (Argentina) A Tiezzi | 0 | 6 | 6
(United States) K Copeland (United States) S Rimes | 6 | 1 | 4
(Brazil) L Tella (Brazil) A Vieira | 6 | 6
(Austria) B Diesner (Austria) B Paulus | 2 | 1

Second round
1 | (Peru) L Gildemeister (Austria) P Huber | 3 | 6 | 6
(Brazil) L Corsato-Owsianka (United States) A Schwartz | 6 | 1 | 2
(Italy) F Bonsignori (Netherlands) H ter Riet | w/o
7 | (Sweden) M Lindström (Peru) P Vásquez
4 | (West Germany) I Cueto (Spain) A Sánchez Vicario | 6 | 6
(Argentina) M Pérez Roldán (Argentina) A Tiezzi | 3 | 3
(Brazil) L Tella (Brazil) A Vieira | 3 | 1
5 | (United States) Le Allen (Argentina) A Villagrán | 6 | 6

Quarterfinals
1 | (Peru) L Gildemeister (Austria) P Huber | 3 | 6 | 6
(Italy) F Bonsignori (Netherlands) H ter Riet | 6 | 1 | 2
4 | (West Germany) I Cueto (Spain) A Sánchez Vicario | 4 | 2
5 | (United States) Le Allen (Argentina) A Villagrán | 6 | 6

Semifinals
1 | (Peru) L Gildemeister (Austria) P Huber | 5 | 6 | 6
5 | (United States) Le Allen (Argentina) A Villagrán | 7 | 3 | 0

=== Bottom half ===
First round
(Italy) L Golarsa (Brazil) G Miró | 7 | 6
(Brazil) Roberta Caldas (Brazil) G Faria | 5 | 2
(Mexico) X Escobedo (United States) P Jung | 1 | 1
(United States) J Golder (United States) V Nelson | 6 | 6
(United States) R Daniels (Italy) C Nozzoli | 6 | 6
(Austria) K Oberleitner (Austria) Miriam Schweda | 3 | 2
(Argentina) B Fulco (Argentina) G Mosca | 2 | 3
(Czechoslovakia) M Pazderová (Czechoslovakia) P Ritter | 6 | 6

Second round
6 | (United States) E Rapponi-Longo (Argentina) P Tarabini | 6 | 6
(Italy) L Golarsa (Brazil) G Miró | 2 | 2
(United States) J Golder (United States) V Nelson | 3 | 0
3 | (Netherlands) M Bollegraf (Netherlands) N Jagerman | 6 | 6
8 | (Italy) L Jachia (Italy) S La Fratta | 5 | 4
(United States) R Daniels (Italy) C Nozzoli | 7 | 6
(Czechoslovakia) M Pazderová (Czechoslovakia) P Ritter | 3 | 5
2 | (Brazil) N Dias (Brazil) P Medrado | 6 | 7

Quarterfinals
6 | (United States) E Rapponi-Longo (Argentina) P Tarabini | 3 | 0
3 | (Netherlands) M Bollegraf (Netherlands) N Jagerman | 6 | 6
(United States) R Daniels (Italy) C Nozzoli | 1 | 1
2 | (Brazil) N Dias (Brazil) P Medrado | 6 | 6

Semifinals
3 | (Netherlands) M Bollegraf (Netherlands) N Jagerman
2 | (Brazil) N Dias (Brazil) P Medrado | w/o
