= 1988 French Open – Women's singles =

Women's singles
- 1988 French Open

Final
- Champion: (West Germany) Steffi Graf
- Runner-up: (Soviet Union) Natasha Zvereva
- Score: 6–0, 6–0

Details
- Draw: 128
- Seeds: 16

Events
| Singles | men | women | | boys | girls |
| Doubles | men | women | mixed | boys | girls |
| WC Singles | men | women | quad |
| WC Doubles | men | women | quad |
| Legends | −45 | 45+ | women |
- French Open

Defending champion Steffi Graf defeated Natasha Zvereva in the final, 6–0, 6–0 to win the women's singles tennis title at the 1988 French Open. It was her second French Open title and third major title overall. Graf did not lose a set during the tournament, dropping only 20 games. The final was the shortest major final of the Open Era; the official duration of the match was 34 minutes, with only 32 minutes of play due to a rain break. It was the second "double bagel" major final in history, after the 1911 Wimbledon Championships.

The win marked Graf's second step towards completing the first, and so far only Golden Slam in the history of women's singles tennis. Graf recorded a total of six "bagel" (6–0) sets across her seven matches. The final was the first major final since the 1981 French Open not to feature either Martina Navratilova or Chris Evert.

== Seeds ==
1. (West Germany) Steffi Graf (champion)
2. (United States) Martina Navratilova (fourth round)
3. (United States) Chris Evert (third round)
4. (Argentina) Gabriela Sabatini (semifinals)
5. (Bulgaria) Manuela Maleeva-Fragnière (third round)
6. (Czechoslovakia) Helena Suková (quarterfinals)
7. (West Germany) Claudia Kohde-Kilsch (third round)
8. (Australia) Hana Mandlíková (second round)
9. (United States) Lori McNeil (third round)
10. (United States) Zina Garrison (fourth round)
11. (Bulgaria) Katerina Maleeva (first round)
12. (Italy) Raffaella Reggi (second round)
13. (Soviet Union) Natasha Zvereva (final)
14. (Italy) Anna-Maria Cecchini (third round)
15. (West Germany) Sylvia Hanika (fourth round)
16. (United States) Mary Joe Fernández (withdrew before event)

== Draw ==
Key

- Q = Qualifier
- WC = Wild card
- LL = Lucky loser
- Alt = Alternate
- ITF = ITF entry
- PR = Protected ranking
- SR = Special ranking
- SE = Special exempt
- JE = Junior exempt
- JR = Junior Accelerator Programme entrant
- CO = College Accelerator Programme entrant
- NG = Next Gen Accelerator Program entrant
- w/o = Walkover
- r = Retired
- d = Defaulted

=== Finals ===
Quarterfinals
1 | (West Germany) Steffi Graf | 6 | 6
(Argentina) Bettina Fulco | 0 | 1
4 | (Argentina) Gabriela Sabatini | 4 | 6 | 6
(Canada) Helen Kelesi | 6 | 1 | 3
(Australia) Nicole Provis | 7 | 3 | 6
(Spain) Arantxa Sánchez Vicario | 5 | 6 | 4
6 | (Czechoslovakia) Helena Suková | 2 | 3
13 | (Soviet Union) Natasha Zvereva | 6 | 6

Semifinals
1 | (West Germany) Steffi Graf | 6 | 7^{7}
4 | (Argentina) Gabriela Sabatini | 3 | 6^{3}
(Australia) Nicole Provis | 3 | 7^{7} | 5
13 | (Soviet Union) Natasha Zvereva | 6 | 6^{3} | 7

Final
1 | (West Germany) Steffi Graf | 6 | 6
13 | (Soviet Union) Natasha Zvereva | 0 | 0

=== Top half ===
==== Section 1 ====
First round
1 | (West Germany) S Graf | 6 | 6
WC | (France) N Guerrée | 0 | 4
(United States) N Sodupe | 3 | 3
(United States) R Reis | 6 | 6
(West Germany) E Pfaff | 6 | 6
(United States) A Frazier | 3 | 2
(United States) C Benjamin | 2 | 6 | 1
(United States) S Sloane | 6 | 0 | 6
(France) P Paradis | 1 | 6 | 4
(Australia) J Byrne | 6 | 1 | 6
(United States) K Rinaldi | 6 | 5 | 5
(South Africa) D Van Rensburg | 4 | 7 | 7
(France) N Tauziat | 6 | 6
(Netherlands) M Bollegraf | 3 | 2
(United States) H Cioffi | 0 | 4
LL | (Brazil) L Corsato | 6 | 6

Second round
1 | (West Germany) S Graf | 6 | 6
(United States) R Reis | 1 | 0
(West Germany) E Pfaff | 3 | 6 | 3
(United States) S Sloane | 6 | 3 | 6
(Australia) J Byrne | 7 | 7^{7}
(South Africa) D Van Rensburg | 5 | 6^{3}
(France) N Tauziat | 6 | 6
LL | (Brazil) L Corsato | 3 | 0

Third round
1 | (West Germany) S Graf | 6 | 6
(United States) S Sloane | 0 | 1
(Australia) J Byrne | 5 | 2
(France) N Tauziat | 7 | 6

Fourth round
1 | (West Germany) S Graf | 6 | 6
(France) N Tauziat | 1 | 3

==== Section 2 ====
First round
9 | (United States) L McNeil | 6 | 6
(United States) E Hakami | 3 | 2
(Switzerland) C Jolissaint | 6^{5} | 6 | 6
(United States) P Casale | 7^{7} | 1 | 1
(Denmark) T Scheuer-Larsen | 6 | 6
(France) C Suire | 3 | 2
Q | (Spain) C Martínez | 6 | 6
(France) A Dechaume | 0 | 2
(Czechoslovakia) R Zrubáková | 6 | 6
(United Kingdom) M Javer | 0 | 0
(Argentina) P Tarabini | 1 | 6 | 6
(Czechoslovakia) J Novotná | 6 | 3 | 2
(Argentina) B Fulco | 6 | 6
Q | (France) M-C Damas | 0 | 2
(Australia) E Minter | 2 | 1
8 | (Australia) H Mandlíková | 6 | 6

Second round
9 | (United States) L McNeil | 6 | 4 | 6
(Switzerland) C Jolissaint | 1 | 6 | 2
(Denmark) T Scheuer-Larsen | 2 | 0
Q | (Spain) C Martínez | 6 | 6
(Czechoslovakia) R Zrubáková | 6 | 6
(Argentina) P Tarabini | 4 | 4
(Argentina) B Fulco | 6 | 6
8 | (Australia) H Mandlíková | 4 | 3

Third round
9 | (United States) L McNeil | 6 | 3 | 1
Q | (Spain) C Martínez | 1 | 6 | 6
(Czechoslovakia) R Zrubáková | 2 | 1
(Argentina) B Fulco | 6 | 6

Fourth round
Q | (Spain) C Martínez | 2 | 4
(Argentina) B Fulco | 6 | 6

==== Section 3 ====
First round
4 | (Argentina) G Sabatini | 6 | 7
WC | (France) M Laval | 1 | 5
(Sweden) M Lindström | 7^{7} | 3 | 1
(South Africa) K Schimper | 6^{4} | 6 | 6
(United States) M Louie-Harper | 1 | 6 | 6
(United States) L Bonder | 6 | 3 | 4
(Australia) M Jaggard | 3 | 3
(Japan) M Yanagi | 6 | 6
(Argentina) M Pérez Roldán | 7^{7} | 4 | 6
(United States) S Mascarin | 6^{2} | 6 | 4
(Netherlands) B Schultz | 7 | 6
(Belgium) S Wasserman | 5 | 0
(South Africa) R Fairbank | 6^{3} | 6^{3}
Q | (Czechoslovakia) J Pospíšilová | 7^{7} | 7^{7}
(Japan) K Okamoto | 1 | 3
14 | (Italy) A-M Cecchini | 6 | 6

Second round
4 | (Argentina) G Sabatini | 6 | 6
(South Africa) K Schimper | 3 | 0
(United States) M Louie-Harper | 6 | 1 | 2
(Japan) M Yanagi | 4 | 6 | 6
(Argentina) M Pérez Roldán | w/o
(Netherlands) B Schultz
Q | (Czechoslovakia) J Pospíšilová | 1 | 0
14 | (Italy) A-M Cecchini | 6 | 6

Third round
4 | (Argentina) G Sabatini | 6 | 6
(Japan) M Yanagi | 3 | 0
(Netherlands) B Schultz | 6 | 7
14 | (Italy) A-M Cecchini | 4 | 5

Fourth round
4 | (Argentina) G Sabatini | 6 | 6
(Netherlands) B Schultz | 4 | 1

==== Section 4 ====
First round
12 | (Italy) R Reggi | 6 | 6
(Socialist Federal Republic of Yugoslavia) S Goleš | 4 | 2
(West Germany) C Singer | 6 | 2 | 2
Q | (Sweden) M Strandlund | 1 | 6 | 6
(Netherlands) M Mesker | 3 | 1
LL | (Netherlands) N Jagerman | 6 | 6
(Brazil) G Miró | 3 | 2
(France) J Halard | 6 | 6
WC | (France) M-C Calleja | 6 | 2 | 4
(Canada) H Kelesi | 4 | 6 | 6
(France) N Herreman | 2 | 2
(Czechoslovakia) A Holíková | 6 | 6
(United States) K Horvath | 2 | 6 | 3
(Italy) L Ferrando | 6 | 2 | 6
(Austria) P Huber | 3 | 1
5 | (Bulgaria) M Maleeva-Fragnière | 6 | 6

Second round
12 | (Italy) R Reggi | 6 | 1 | 3
Q | (Sweden) M Strandlund | 3 | 6 | 6
LL | (Netherlands) N Jagerman | 7^{7} | 7^{7}
(France) J Halard | 6^{5} | 6^{2}
(Canada) H Kelesi | 6 | 6
(Czechoslovakia) A Holíková | 2 | 2
(Italy) L Ferrando | 0 | 2
5 | (Bulgaria) M Maleeva-Fragnière | 6 | 6

Third round
Q | (Sweden) M Strandlund | 6 | 1 | 3
LL | (Netherlands) N Jagerman | 4 | 6 | 6
(Canada) H Kelesi | 6 | 6
5 | (Bulgaria) M Maleeva-Fragnière | 4 | 2

Fourth round
LL | (Netherlands) N Jagerman | 2 | 1
(Canada) H Kelesi | 6 | 6

=== Bottom half ===
==== Section 5 ====
First round
7 | (West Germany) C Kohde-Kilsch | 6 | 6
(Greece) A Kanellopoulou | 2 | 4
(Italy) F Bonsignori | 5 | 6 | 6
(United States) H Na | 7 | 4 | 3
WC | (France) S Niox-Château | 0 | 3
(Australia) N Provis | 6 | 6
(Czechoslovakia) R Maršíková | 2 | 2
WC | (France) E Derly | 6 | 6
Q | (West Germany) S Hack | 4 | 1
(West Germany) W Probst | 6 | 6
(Japan) A Kijimuta | 6 | 3 | 2
(France) I Demongeot | 4 | 6 | 6
WC | (France) K Quentrec | 2 | 6 | 6
(Argentina) A Villagrán | 6 | 3 | 3
(West Germany) C Porwik | 1 | 3
15 | (West Germany) S Hanika | 6 | 6

Second round
7 | (West Germany) C Kohde-Kilsch | 6 | 6
(Italy) F Bonsignori | 4 | 0
(Australia) N Provis | 5 | 6 | 6
WC | (France) E Derly | 7 | 3 | 1
(West Germany) W Probst | 4 | 1
(France) I Demongeot | 6 | 6
WC | (France) K Quentrec | 7 | 2 | 2
15 | (West Germany) S Hanika | 5 | 6 | 6

Third round
7 | (West Germany) C Kohde-Kilsch | 6 | 4 | 5
(Australia) N Provis | 1 | 6 | 7
(France) I Demongeot | 6 | 5 | 4
15 | (West Germany) S Hanika | 3 | 7 | 6

Fourth round
(Australia) N Provis | 7^{7} | 7^{7}
15 | (West Germany) S Hanika | 6^{1} | 6^{4}

==== Section 6 ====
First round
11 | (Bulgaria) K Maleeva | 4 | 5
(France) C Tanvier | 6 | 7
(Netherlands) H Witvoet | 7^{8} | 6
Q | (Argentina) A Tiezzi | 6^{6} | 3
(United States) T Phelps | 6^{3} | 2
(United Kingdom) J Durie | 7^{7} | 6
(Canada) C Bassett-Seguso | 3 | 0
(South Africa) E Reinach | 6 | 6
(West Germany) S Meier | 6 | 6
(Australia) A Minter | 1 | 3
(Poland) I Kuczyńska | 2 | 0
(Spain) A Sánchez Vicario | 6 | 6
Q | (Italy) B Romanò | 6 | 6
Q | (Sweden) J Jonerup | 2 | 0
(Austria) J Wiesner | 1 | 4
3 | (United States) C Evert | 6 | 6

Second round
(France) C Tanvier | 6 | 6
(Netherlands) H Witvoet | 1 | 1
(United Kingdom) J Durie | 1 | 4
(South Africa) E Reinach | 6 | 6
(West Germany) S Meier | 5 | 0
(Spain) A Sánchez Vicario | 7 | 6
Q | (Italy) B Romanò | 5 | 2
3 | (United States) C Evert | 7 | 6

Third round
(France) C Tanvier | 3 | 6 | 6
(South Africa) E Reinach | 6 | 4 | 3
(Spain) A Sánchez Vicario | 6 | 7^{7}
3 | (United States) C Evert | 1 | 6^{4}

Fourth round
(France) C Tanvier | 2 | 0
(Spain) A Sánchez Vicario | 6 | 6

==== Section 7 ====
First round
6 | (Czechoslovakia) H Suková | 6 | 6
(West Germany) I Cueto | 2 | 0
LL | (Belgium) S Appelmans | 6 | 6^{4} | 6
(United States) E Burgin | 4 | 7^{7} | 0
(Sweden) C Lindqvist | 7 | 4 | 3
(Argentina) M Paz | 5 | 6 | 6
(United States) D Faber | 6 | 6
WC | (France) C Mothes-Jobkel | 0 | 4
(United States) K Adams | 5 | 6 | 3
(Italy) L Garrone | 7 | 1 | 6
(United States) M Torres | 6 | 6
(Soviet Union) N Bykova | 1 | 2
(Brazil) N Dias | 7^{8} | 3 | 5
(Czechoslovakia) I Budařová | 6^{6} | 6 | 7
(United States) S Rehe | 2 | 6 | 1
10 | (United States) Z Garrison | 6 | 4 | 6

Second round
6 | (Czechoslovakia) H Suková | 6 | 6
LL | (Belgium) S Appelmans | 1 | 4
(Argentina) M Paz | 7^{7} | 6
(United States) D Faber | 6^{4} | 4
(Italy) L Garrone | 1 | 6 | 4
(United States) M Torres | 6 | 2 | 6
(Czechoslovakia) I Budařová | 0 | 7^{7} | 2
10 | (United States) Z Garrison | 6 | 6^{4} | 6

Third round
6 | (Czechoslovakia) H Suková | 6 | 6
(Argentina) M Paz | 4 | 4
(United States) M Torres | 1 | 1
10 | (United States) Z Garrison | 6 | 6

Fourth round
6 | (Czechoslovakia) H Suková | 6 | 6
10 | (United States) Z Garrison | 1 | 2

==== Section 8 ====
First round
13 | (Soviet Union) N Zvereva | 7^{7} | 6
(Italy) L Golarsa | 6^{5} | 0
(United States) C Christian | 1 | 6 | 1
(Australia) L Field | 6 | 4 | 6
(West Germany) S Auer | 5 | 5
(United States) M Gurney | 7 | 7
WC | (France) N van Lottum | 7 | 6
(Switzerland) C Cohen | 5 | 3
LL | (United Kingdom) C Wood | 1 | 6^{3}
(Austria) B Paulus | 6 | 7^{7}
(Switzerland) E Krapl | 3 | 6 | 5
(Belgium) A Devries | 6 | 4 | 7
(Netherlands) H ter Riet | 6 | 7
(United States) B Herr | 0 | 5
(Brazil) P Medrado | 0 | 3
2 | (United States) M Navratilova | 6 | 6

Second round
13 | (Soviet Union) N Zvereva | 6 | 6
(Australia) L Field | 2 | 0
(United States) M Gurney | 2 | 6 | 7
WC | (France) N van Lottum | 6 | 2 | 5
(Austria) B Paulus | 6 | 6
(Belgium) A Devries | 3 | 2
(Netherlands) H ter Riet | 1 | 0 | r
2 | (United States) M Navratilova | 6 | 2

Third round
13 | (Soviet Union) N Zvereva | 6 | 6
(United States) M Gurney | 0 | 4
(Austria) B Paulus | 2 | 2
2 | (United States) M Navratilova | 6 | 6

Fourth round
13 | (Soviet Union) N Zvereva | 6 | 7^{7}
2 | (United States) M Navratilova | 3 | 6^{5}

| Preceded by 1988 Australian Open – Women's singles | Grand Slam women's singles | Succeeded by 1988 Wimbledon Championships – Women's singles |
