= 1988 French Open – Women's doubles =

Women's doubles
- 1988 French Open

Final
- Champion: (United States) Martina Navratilova (United States) Pam Shriver
- Runner-up: (West Germany) Claudia Kohde-Kilsch (Czechoslovakia) Helena Suková
- Score: 6–2, 7–5

Details
- Draw: 64 (4 WC )
- Seeds: 16

Events
Singles	men	women		boys	girls
Doubles	men	women	mixed	boys	girls
WC Singles	men	women	quad
WC Doubles	men	women	quad
Legends	−45	45+	women
← 1987 ·	French Open	· 1989 →

Defending champions Martina Navratilova and Pam Shriver defeated Claudia Kohde-Kilsch and Helena Suková in the final, 6–2, 7–5 to win the women's doubles tennis title at the 1988 French Open. It was Navratilova's fifth straight French Open title in women's doubles.

== Seeds ==
1. (United States) Martina Navratilova / (United States) Pam Shriver (champions)
2. (West Germany) Claudia Kohde-Kilsch / (Czechoslovakia) Helena Suková (final)
3. (West Germany) Steffi Graf / (Argentina) Gabriela Sabatini (semifinals)
4. (United States) Lori McNeil / (United States) Betsy Nagelsen (third round)
5. (United States) Katrina Adams / (United States) Zina Garrison (quarterfinals)
6. (United States) Elise Burgin / (Australia) Hana Mandlíková (third round)
7. (Sweden) Catarina Lindqvist / (Denmark) Tine Scheuer-Larsen (second round)
8. (France) Catherine Suire / (France) Catherine Tanvier (quarterfinals)
9. (Soviet Union) Natalia Bykova / (Soviet Union) Natasha Zvereva (third round)
10. (United States) Penny Barg / (Argentina) Mercedes Paz (second round)
11. (Australia) Jenny Byrne / (Australia) Janine Tremelling (quarterfinals)
12. (South Africa) Rosalyn Fairbank / (United States) Mareen Louie Harper (second round)
13. (France) Isabelle Demongeot / (France) Nathalie Tauziat (third round)
14. (France) Nathalie Herreman / (France) Pascale Paradis (quarterfinals)
15. (Netherlands) Manon Bollegraf / (Netherlands) Marianne van der Torre (second round)
16. (United States) Anna-Maria Fernandez / (Switzerland) Christiane Jolissaint (first round)

== Draw ==
=== Key ===
- Q = Qualifier
- WC = Wild card
- LL = Lucky loser
- Alt = Alternate
- SE = Special exempt
- PR = Protected ranking
- ITF = ITF entry
- JE = Junior exempt
- w/o = Walkover
- r = Retired
- d = Defaulted
- SR = Special ranking

=== Finals ===
Quarterfinals
1	(United States) Martina Navratilova (United States) Pam Shriver	6	6
5	(United States) Katrina Adams (United States) Zina Garrison	3	2
3	(West Germany) Steffi Graf (Argentina) Gabriela Sabatini	6	4	6
8	(France) Catherine Suire (France) Catherine Tanvier	1	6	1
(Australia) Nicole Provis (South Africa) Elna Reinach	6	6
14	(France) Nathalie Herreman (France) Pascale Paradis	1	4
11	(Australia) Jenny Byrne (Australia) Janine Tremelling	3	5
2	(West Germany) Claudia Kohde-Kilsch (Czechoslovakia) Helena Suková	6	7

Semifinals
1	(United States) Martina Navratilova (United States) Pam Shriver	6	7
3	(West Germany) Steffi Graf (Argentina) Gabriela Sabatini	2	5
(Australia) Nicole Provis (South Africa) Elna Reinach	6^{9}	3
2	(West Germany) Claudia Kohde-Kilsch (Czechoslovakia) Helena Suková	7	6

Final
1	(United States) Martina Navratilova (United States) Pam Shriver	6	7
2	(West Germany) Claudia Kohde-Kilsch (Czechoslovakia) Helena Suková	2	5

=== Top half ===
==== Section 1 ====
First round
1	(United States) M Navratilova (United States) P Shriver	6	6
(Australia) E Minter (United States) J Thomas	2	2
(Argentina) G Mosca (West Germany) C Singer	2	3
(Bulgaria) K Maleeva (Bulgaria) Man Maleeva	6	6
(Sweden) AK Olsson (Sweden) M Strandlund	5	2
WC	(France) S Sabas (France) N van Lottum	7	6
WC	(France) MC Calleja (France) S Niox-Château	3	4
9	(Soviet Union) N Bykova (Soviet Union) N Zvereva	6	6
13	(France) I Demongeot (France) N Tauziat	2	6	6
(South Africa) M de Swardt (Argentina) A Tiezzi	6	3	4
(Australia) A Minter (Netherlands) H Witvoet	2	2
(Czechoslovakia) J Pospíšilová (Czechoslovakia) R Zrubáková	6	6
(Australia) L Field (Italy) L Garrone	2	7	6
(France) S Amiach (United States) J Smoller	6	5	4
(South Africa) K Schimper (United States) W Wood	1	6	0
5	(United States) K Adams (United States) Z Garrison	6	3	6

Second round
1	(United States) M Navratilova (United States) P Shriver	7	6
(Bulgaria) K Maleeva (Bulgaria) Man Maleeva	6^{6}	2
WC	(France) S Sabas (France) N van Lottum	3	1
9	(Soviet Union) N Bykova (Soviet Union) N Zvereva	6	6
13	(France) I Demongeot (France) N Tauziat	6
(Czechoslovakia) J Pospíšilová (Czechoslovakia) R Zrubáková	3^{r}
(Australia) L Field (Italy) L Garrone	1	3
5	(United States) K Adams (United States) Z Garrison	6	6

Third round
1	(United States) M Navratilova (United States) P Shriver	6	6
9	(Soviet Union) N Bykova (Soviet Union) N Zvereva	3	2
13	(France) I Demongeot (France) N Tauziat	4	6	3
5	(United States) K Adams (United States) Z Garrison	6	2	6

Quarterfinals
1	(United States) M Navratilova (United States) P Shriver	6	6
5	(United States) K Adams (United States) Z Garrison	3	2

==== Section 2 ====
First round
3	(West Germany) S Graf (Argentina) G Sabatini	6	6
(United States) E Hakami (Argentina) A Villagrán	2	3
(West Germany) A Betzner (Austria) J Wiesner	6	6^{6}	3
(Netherlands) I Driehuis (Netherlands) M Mesker	2	7	6
(Netherlands) N Jagerman (Netherlands) S Schilder	6	0	4
(United States) S Mascarin (Brazil) P Medrado	3	6	6
(Netherlands) C Bakkum (Netherlands) B Schultz	2	2
12	(South Africa) R Fairbank (United States) M Louie Harper	6	6
16	(United States) AM Fernandez (Switzerland) C Jolissaint	4	3
(United States) K Horvath (South Africa) D Van Rensburg	6	6
(Argentina) B Fulco (United States) E Raponi-Longo	6	7
(France) J Halard (France) V Paquet	2	6^{7}
(United States) L Allen (United States) B Herr	7	6
(Switzerland) C Cohen (Japan) M Yanagi	6^{7}	4
(Spain) MJ Llorca (Australia) A Scott	3	2
8	(France) C Suire (France) C Tanvier	6	6

Second round
3	(West Germany) S Graf (Argentina) G Sabatini	6	6
(Netherlands) I Driehuis (Netherlands) M Mesker	4	4
(United States) S Mascarin (Brazil) P Medrado	6	4	6
12	(South Africa) R Fairbank (United States) M Louie Harper	1	6	4
(United States) K Horvath (South Africa) D Van Rensburg	6	6
(Argentina) B Fulco (United States) E Rapponi-Longo	3	1
(United States) L Allen (United States) B Herr	3	3
8	(France) C Suire (France) C Tanvier	6	6

Third round
3	(West Germany) S Graf (Argentina) G Sabatini	6	6
(United States) S Mascarin (Brazil) P Medrado	2	2
(United States) K Horvath (South Africa) D Van Rensburg	4	0
8	(France) C Suire (France) C Tanvier	6	6

Quarterfinals
3	(West Germany) S Graf (Argentina) G Sabatini	6	4	6
8	(France) C Suire (France) C Tanvier	1	6	1

=== Bottom half ===
==== Section 3 ====
First round
7	(Sweden) C Lindqvist (Denmark) T Scheuer-Larsen	2	6	7
(Italy) S Cecchini (Socialist Federal Republic of Yugoslavia) S Goleš	6	2	5
(Australia) N Provis (South Africa) E Reinach	6	6
(West Germany) I Cueto (Spain) A Sánchez Vicario	3	4
(Brazil) L Tella (Brazil) A Vieira	6	0	2
(Sweden) M Lindström (West Germany) C Porwik	4	6	6
WC	(France) N Guerrée (France) N Phan-Thanh	4	2
15	(Netherlands) M Bollegraf (Netherlands) M van der Torre	6	6
14	(France) N Herreman (France) P Paradis	6	6
WC	(France) M Laval (France) K Quentrec	1	1
(United States) C Reynolds (United States) P Smith	2	7	3
(Australia) M Jaggard (Canada) H Kelesi	6	6^{4}	6
(South Africa) L Gregory (United States) R Reis	6	7
(Italy) L Ferrando (Italy) L Golarsa	1	5
(Brazil) L Corsato (Brazil) G Faria	2	0
4	(United States) L McNeil (United States) B Nagelsen	6	6

Second round
7	(Sweden) C Lindqvist (Denmark) T Scheuer-Larsen	1	5
(Australia) N Provis (South Africa) E Reinach	6	7
(Sweden) M Lindström (West Germany) C Porwik	5	6	6
15	(Netherlands) M Bollegraf (Netherlands) M van der Torre	7	4	4
14	(France) N Herreman (France) P Paradis	6	6
(Australia) M Jaggard (Canada) H Kelesi	2	1
(South Africa) L Gregory (United States) R Reis	5	5
4	(United States) L McNeil (United States) B Nagelsen	7	7

Third round
(Australia) N Provis (South Africa) E Reinach	7	6
(Sweden) M Lindström (West Germany) C Porwik	5	4
14	(France) N Herreman (France) P Paradis	1	6	6
4	(United States) L McNeil (United States) B Nagelsen	6	4	2

Quarterfinals
(Australia) N Provis (South Africa) E Reinach	6	6
14	(France) N Herreman (France) P Paradis	1	4

==== Section 4 ====
First round
6	(United States) E Burgin (Australia) H Mandlíková	6	7
(Belgium) A Devries (Belgium) S Wasserman	3	5
(Japan) Y Koizumi (United States) S Savides	2	4
(Japan) K Okamoto (Japan) N Sato	6	6
(United States) A Frazier (United States) L Spadea	4	3
(United States) R Casals (United States) J Russell	6	6
(France) A Dechaume (France) E Derly	1	6	0
11	(Australia) J Byrne (Australia) J Tremelling	6	4	6
10	(United States) P Barg (Argentina) M Paz	6	6
(West Germany) E Pfaff (United States) S Rehe	3	3
(Brazil) N Dias (Argentina) P Tarabini	6	3	2
(United States) C Benjamin (United States) H Na	3	6	6
(United States) T Phelps (Italy) R Reggi	6	6
(Czechoslovakia) I Budařová (United States) J Kaplan	3	2
(United States) J Goodling (United States) C Jones	4	1
2	(West Germany) C Kohde-Kilsch (Czechoslovakia) H Suková	6	6

Second round
6	(United States) E Burgin (Australia) H Mandlíková	6	7
(Japan) K Okamoto (Japan) N Sato	3	5
(United States) R Casals (United States) J Russell	2	5
11	(Australia) J Byrne (Australia) J Tremelling	6	7
10	(United States) P Barg (Argentina) M Paz	2	4
(United States) C Benjamin (United States) H Na	6	6
(United States) T Phelps (Italy) R Reggi	1	0
2	(West Germany) C Kohde-Kilsch (Czechoslovakia) H Suková	6	6

Third round
6	(United States) E Burgin (Australia) H Mandlíková	4	4
11	(Australia) J Byrne (Australia) J Tremelling	6	6
(United States) C Benjamin (United States) H Na	3	1
2	(West Germany) C Kohde-Kilsch (Czechoslovakia) H Suková	6	6

Quarterfinals
11	(Australia) J Byrne (Australia) J Tremelling	3	5
2	(West Germany) C Kohde-Kilsch (Czechoslovakia) H Suková	6	7
