= 1989 Spanish Open – Doubles =

Doubles
- 1989 Spanish Open
- 1988 Champions: (Czechoslovakia) Iva Budařová (Belgium) Sandra Wasserman

Final
- Champions: (Czechoslovakia) Jana Novotná (Denmark) Tine Scheuer-Larsen
- Runners-up: (Spain) Arantxa Sánchez (Austria) Judith Wiesner
- Score: 6–2, 2–6, 7–6

Details
- Draw: 16
- Seeds: 4

Events
Singles	Doubles
← 1988 ·	Spanish Open	· 1990 →

Iva Budařová and Sandra Wasserman were the defending champions but did not compete that year.

Jana Novotná and Tine Scheuer-Larsen won in the final 6–2, 2–6, 7–6 against Arantxa Sánchez and Judith Wiesner.

== Seeds ==
Champion seeds are indicated in bold text while text in italics indicates the round in which those seeds were eliminated.

1. (Czechoslovakia) **Jana Novotná** / (Denmark) **Tine Scheuer-Larsen (champions)**
2. (Canada) Helen Kelesi / (France) Catherine Suire (semifinals)
3. (Spain) Arantxa Sánchez / (Austria) Judith Wiesner (final)
4. (France) Sophie Amiach / (France) Alexia Dechaume (semifinals)

== Draw ==
=== Key ===
- Q = Qualifier
- WC = Wild card
- LL = Lucky loser
- Alt = Alternate
- SE = Special exempt
- PR = Protected ranking
- ITF = ITF entry
- JE = Junior exempt
- w/o = Walkover
- r = Retired
- d = Defaulted
- SR = Special ranking

First round

Quarterfinals

Semifinals

Final

1
- (Czechoslovakia) **J Novotná**
- (Denmark) **T Scheuer-Larsen**
**6**
**6**

- (Spain) R Bielsa
- (Spain) A Segura
3
3

1
- (Czechoslovakia) **J Novotná**
- (Denmark) **T Scheuer-Larsen**
**6**
**6**

- (France) **J Halard**
- (Brazil) **G Miró**
**6**
**6**

- (France) J Halard
- (Brazil) G Miró
2
0

- (Italy) F Bonsignori
- (Peru) P Collantes
1
3

1
- (Czechoslovakia) **J Novotná**
- (Denmark) **T Scheuer-Larsen**
**6**
**7**

4
- (France) **S Amiach**
- (France) **A Dechaume**
**6**
**7**

4
- (France) S Amiach
- (France) A Dechaume
2
6

- (Finland) A Aallonen
- (Sweden) A-K Olsson
2
5

4
- (France) **S Amiach**
- (France) **A Dechaume**
**6**
**6**

- (Brazil) N Dias
- (West Germany) S Hack
4
3

- (Italy) L Golarsa
- (Argentina) M Paz
4
3

- (Italy) **L Golarsa**
- (Argentina) **M Paz**
**6**
**6**

1
- (Czechoslovakia) **Jana Novotná**
- (Denmark) **Tine Scheuer-Larsen**
**6**
2
**7**

- (Netherlands) N Jagerman
- (West Germany) S Meier
1
**7**
5

3
- (Spain) Arantxa Sánchez
- (Austria) Judith Wiesner
2
**6**
6

- (Italy) **S La Fratta**
- (Italy) **B Romanò**
**6**
5
**7**

- (Italy) S La Fratta
- (Italy) B Romanò
2
2

- (Brazil) A Vieira
- (Argentina) A Villagrán
0
0

3
- (Spain) **A Sánchez**
- (Austria) **J Wiesner**
**6**
**6**

3
- (Spain) **A Sánchez**
- (Austria) **J Wiesner**
**6**
**6**

3
- (Spain) **A Sánchez**
- (Austria) **J Wiesner**
**6**
**6**

- (Spain) **A Larrakoetxea**
- (Italy) **K Piccolini**
**6**
5
**6**

2
- (Canada) H Kelesi
- (France) C Suire
2
1

- (Spain) J Souto
- (Spain) N Souto
4
**7**
3

- (Spain) A Larrakoetxea
- (Italy) K Piccolini
4
2

- (Spain) M Vaquero
- (Spain) I Varas
3
1

2
- (Canada) **H Kelesi**
- (France) **C Suire**
**6**
**6**

2
- (Canada) **H Kelesi**
- (France) **C Suire**
**6**
**6**
