= 1988 Spanish Open =

Tennis tournament

- Date: 25 April – 1 May
- Edition: 7th
- Category: Category 1
- Draw: 32S / 16D
- Prize money: $50,000
- Surface: Clay / outdoor
- Location: Barcelona, Spain
- Venue: Real Club de Tenis Barcelona

Champions

Singles
- (Brazil) Neige Dias

Doubles
- (Czechoslovakia) Iva Budařová / (Belgium) Sandra Wasserman
← 1986 ·	Spanish Open	· 1989 →

The 1988 Spanish Open was a women's tennis tournament played on outdoor clay courts at the Real Club de Tenis Barcelona in Barcelona, Catalonia in Spain and was part of the Category 1 tier of the 1988 WTA Tour. It was the seventh edition of the tournament and was held from 25 April to 1 May 1988. Fifth-seeded Neige Dias won the singles title.

== Finals ==
=== Singles ===
(Brazil) Neige Dias defeated (Argentina) Bettina Fulco 6–3, 6–3

- It was Dias' only singles title of the year and the 2nd and last of her career.

=== Doubles ===
(Czechoslovakia) Iva Budařová / (Belgium) Sandra Wasserman defeated (Sweden) Anna-Karin Olsson / (Spain) María José Llorca 1–6, 6–3, 6–2

- It was Budařová's only title of the year and the 3rd of her career. It was Wasserman's only title of the year and the 1st of her career.
