= 1987 Brazilian Open – Singles =

Singles
- 1987 Brazilian Open
- 1986 Champion: (United States) Vicki Nelson-Dunbar

Final
- Champion: (Brazil) Neige Dias
- Runner-up: (Brazil) Patricia Medrado
- Score: 6–0, 6–7, 6–4

Details
- Draw: 32
- Seeds: 8

Events
| Singles | Doubles |
| ← 1986 · | Brasil Open | · 1988 → |

Vicki Nelson-Dunbar was the defending champion but lost in the first round to Olga Tsarbopoulou.

Neige Dias won in the final 6–0, 6–7, 6–4 against Patricia Medrado.

== Seeds ==
A champion seed is indicated in bold text while text in italics indicates the round in which that seed was eliminated.

1. (West Germany) Isabel Cueto (second round)
2. (Argentina) Bettina Fulco (semifinals)
3. (Switzerland) Christiane Jolissaint (second round)
4. (Italy) Laura Garrone (quarterfinals)
5. (Argentina) Mercedes Paz (quarterfinals)
6. (Austria) Barbara Paulus (quarterfinals)
7. (United States) Vicki Nelson-Dunbar (first round)
8. (Argentina) Adriana Villagrán (first round)

== Draw ==
=== Key ===
- Q = Qualifier
- WC = Wild card
- LL = Lucky loser
- Alt = Alternate
- SE = Special exempt
- PR = Protected ranking
- ITF = ITF entry
- JE = Junior exempt
- w/o = Walkover
- r = Retired
- d = Defaulted
- SR = Special ranking

First round
1 | (West Germany) **I Cueto** | **6** | **6**
(United States) J Golder | 1 | 0
(United States) **A Frazier** | **6** | **6**
Q | (France) P Etchemendy | 2 | 4
(United States) M Brown | 4 | **7** | 3
(Canada) **J Hetherington** | **6** | 6 | **6**
(Italy) S La Fratta | 4 | 0
6 | (Austria) **B Paulus** | **6** | **6**
4 | (Italy) **L Garrone** | **6** | **6**
(West Germany) A Betzner | 4 | 3
Q | (United States) **C Christian** | **6** | **3**
(Brazil) C Monteiro | 1 | 0 | r
(Peru) P Vásquez | 3 | 1
(Brazil) **N Dias** | **6** | **6**
(Netherlands) **C Bakkum** | **7** | **6**
8 | (Argentina) A Villagrán | 5 | 2
5 | (Argentina) **M Paz** | **6** | **6**
Q | (West Germany) S Hack | 2 | 3
(Brazil) **L Corsato** | **6** | **7**
(United States) K Adams | 3 | 5
(Brazil) **P Medrado** | **6** | 3 | **6**
(Brazil) A Vieira | 2 | **6** | 0
(France) M-C Damas | 2 | 4
3 | (Switzerland) **C Jolissaint** | **6** | **6**
7 | (United States) V Nelson-Dunbar | 3 | 3
(Greece) **O Tsarbopoulou** | **6** | **6**
(Brazil) G Miró | 3 | **6** | 4
Q | (Switzerland) **C Cohen** | **6** | 1 | **6**
(United States) **E Raponi-Longo** | **6** | 6 | **7**
(United States) L Antonoplis | 2 | **7** | 6
(Italy) L Lapi | 6 | 1
2 | (Argentina) **B Fulco** | **7** | **6**

Second round
1 | (West Germany) B Fulco | 1 | 3
(United States) **A Frazier** | **6** | **6**
(Canada) J Hetherington | 4 | r
6 | (Austria) **B Paulus** | **5**
4 | (Italy) **L Garrone** | **6** | **6**
Q | (United States) C Christian | 1 | 1
(Brazil) **N Dias** | **6** | **6**
(Netherlands) C Bakkum | 0 | 1
5 | (Argentina) **M Paz** | **6** | **6**
(Brazil) L Corsato | 2 | 0
(Brazil) **P Medrado** | **6** | **6**
3 | (Switzerland) C Jolissaint | 3 | 1
(Greece) O Tsarbopoulou | 4 | 4
(Switzerland) **C Cohen** | **6** | **6**
(United States) E Raponi-Longo | **6** | 1 | 1
2 | (Argentina) **B Fulco** | 3 | **6** | **6**

Quarterfinals
(United States) **A Frazier** | **6** | 3 | **6**
6 | (Austria) B Paulus | 1 | **6** | 1
4 | (Italy) L Garrone | 3 | 2
(Brazil) **N Dias** | **6** | **6**
5 | (Argentina) M Paz | **6** | 5 | 0
(Brazil) **P Medrado** | 2 | **7** | **6**
(Switzerland) C Cohen | 4 | 1
2 | (Argentina) **B Fulco** | **6** | **6**

Semifinals
(United States) A Frazier | 1 | 1
(Brazil) **N Dias** | **6** | **6**
(Brazil) **P Medrado** | **6** | **6**
2 | (Argentina) B Fulco | 4 | 1

Final
(Brazil) **Neige Dias** | **6** | 6 | **6**
(Brazil) Patricia Medrado | 0 | **7** | 4
