= 1988 French Open – Mixed doubles =

Mixed doubles
- 1988 French Open

Final
- Champion: (United States) Lori McNeil (Mexico) Jorge Lozano
- Runner-up: (Netherlands) Brenda Schultz (Netherlands) Michiel Schapers
- Score: 7–5, 6–2

Details
- Draw: 56

Events
Singles	men	women		boys	girls
Doubles	men	women	mixed	boys	girls
WC Singles	men	women	quad
WC Doubles	men	women	quad
Legends	−45	45+	women
- French Open

The mixed doubles tournament at the 1988 French Open was held from 23 May until 5 June 1988 on the outdoor clay courts at the Stade Roland Garros in Paris, France. Lori McNeil and Jorge Lozano won the title, defeating Brenda Schultz and Michiel Schapers in the final.

== Draw ==
Key

- Q = Qualifier
- WC = Wild card
- LL = Lucky loser
- Alt = Alternate
- ITF = ITF entry
- PR = Protected ranking
- SR = Special ranking
- SE = Special exempt
- JE = Junior exempt
- JR = Junior Accelerator Programme entrant
- CO = College Accelerator Programme entrant
- NG = Next Gen Accelerator Program entrant
- w/o = Walkover
- r = Retired
- d = Defaulted

=== Finals ===
Quarterfinals
(Spain) Emilio Sánchez (United States) Martina Navratilova	2	7	6
(Argentina) Horacio de la Peña (Argentina) Mercedes Paz	6	6	2
(Mexico) Jorge Lozano (United States) Lori McNeil	6	6
(United States) Jim Pugh (Switzerland) Christiane Jolissaint	2	3
(Netherlands) Tom Nijssen (Netherlands) Manon Bollegraf	5	6	7
(France) Guy Forget (United States) Betsy Nagelsen	6	2	5
(Netherlands) Michiel Schapers (Netherlands) Brenda Schultz	6	6
(United States) Eric Korita (United States) Penny Barg	2	4

Semifinals
(Spain) Emilio Sánchez (United States) Martina Navratilova	6	5
(Mexico) Jorge Lozano (United States) Lori McNeil	7	7
(Netherlands) Tom Nijssen (Netherlands) Manon Bollegraf	2	6	3
(Netherlands) Michiel Schapers (Netherlands) Brenda Schultz	6	2	6

Final
(Mexico) Jorge Lozano (United States) Lori McNeil	7	6
(Netherlands) Michiel Schapers (Netherlands) Brenda Schultz	5	2

=== Top half ===
==== Section 1 ====
First round
(Australia) D Macpherson (Australia) J Tremelling	4	6	6
(France) R Gilbert (France) A Dechaume	6	4	4
(France) L Courteau (France) V Paquet	1	2
(Australia) D Cahill (Australia) N Provis	6	6
(Spain) J Arrese (Spain) MJ Llorca	3	3
(Australia) B Dyke (United States) C Reynolds	6	6
(United States) B Willenborg (United States) T Phelps	6	7
(United States) K Flach (Canada) C Bassett-Seguso	3	6
(Australia) T Woodbridge (South Africa) R Fairbank	7	7
(Netherlands) M Oosting (Netherlands) C Bakkum	6	6
(Spain) J López Maeso (Argentina) B Fulco	2	3
(Argentina) H de la Peña (Argentina) M Paz	6	6

Second round
(Spain) E Sánchez (United States) M Navratilova	6	6
(Australia) D Macpherson (Australia) J Tremelling	3	4
(Australia) D Cahill (Australia) N Provis	6	6
(Australia) B Dyke (United States) C Reynolds	2	4
(United States) B Willenborg (United States) T Phelps	7	4	1
(Australia) T Woodbridge (South Africa) R Fairbank	6	6	6
(Argentina) H de la Peña (Argentina) M Paz	7	6
(United States) S Stewart (United States) Z Garrison	6	4

Third round
(Spain) E Sánchez (United States) M Navratilova	6	6
(Australia) D Cahill (Australia) N Provis	2	4
(Australia) T Woodbridge (South Africa) R Fairbank	7	6	8
(Argentina) H de la Peña (Argentina) M Paz	5	7	10

Quarterfinals
(Spain) E Sánchez (United States) M Navratilova	2	7	6
(Argentina) H de la Peña (Argentina) M Paz	6	6	2

==== Section 2 ====
First round
(United States) J Levine (United States) J Kaplan	7	1	6
(South Africa) P Norval (South Africa) R Gaddie	5	6	2
(France) JP Fleurian (France) P Etchemendy	6	6
(West Germany) H Rittersbacher (South Africa) M Kruger	0	2
(United States) R Leach (Canada) H Kelesi	7	2	6
(United States) M Davis (Netherlands) M van der Torre	6	6	3
(Australia) L Warder (Australia) A Minter	6	7
(France) É Winogradsky (France) J Halard	4	5
(Spain) A Tous (France) C Tanvier	7	6
(Czechoslovakia) S Birner (United States) R Casals	5	4
(Spain) J Sánchez (Spain) A Sánchez Vicario	2	7	7
(Sweden) M Gustafsson (Belgium) A Devries	6	5	5

Second round
(Mexico) J Lozano (United States) L McNeil	6	6
(United States) J Levine (United States) J Kaplan	2	1
(France) JP Fleurian (France) P Etchemendy	6	6
(United States) R Leach (Canada) H Kelesi	2	4
(Australia) L Warder (Australia) A Minter	6	7	2
(Spain) A Tous (France) C Tanvier	7	6	6
(Spain) J Sánchez (Spain) A Sánchez Vicario	7	3	1
(United States) J Pugh (Switzerland) C Jolissaint	6	6	6

Third round
(Mexico) J Lozano (United States) L McNeil	6	6
(France) JP Fleurian (France) P Etchemendy	3	3
(Spain) A Tous (France) C Tanvier	5	2
(United States) J Pugh (Switzerland) C Jolissaint	7	6

Quarterfinals
(Mexico) J Lozano (United States) L McNeil	6	6
(United States) J Pugh (Switzerland) C Jolissaint	2	3

=== Bottom half ===
==== Section 3 ====
First round
(Brazil) M Menezes (Brazil) L Tella	3	6	8
(Iran) M Bahrami (United States) E Hakami	6	2	6
(United States) R Baxter (Netherlands) I Driehuis	2	4
(Austria) T Muster (Austria) J Wiesner	6	6
(Soviet Union) A Võsand (Soviet Union) N Bykova	3	3
(Netherlands) T Nijssen (Netherlands) M Bollegraf	6	6
(Australia) M Woodforde (Australia) M Jaggard	2	2
(United States) P Chamberlin (United States) AM Fernandez	6	6
(Australia) S Youl (Australia) J Byrne	3	4
(Brazil) D Marcelino (Brazil) A Vieira	6	6
(United States) M De Palmer (United States) J Russell	5	4
(United States) T Pawsat (United States) B Herr	7	6

Second round
(United States) A Kohlberg (United States) E Burgin	6	6
(Brazil) M Menezes (Brazil) L Tella	2	2
(Austria) T Muster (Austria) J Wiesner	3	4
(Netherlands) T Nijssen (Netherlands) M Bollegraf	6	6
(United States) P Chamberlin (United States) AM Fernandez	5	6	6
(Brazil) D Marcelino (Brazil) A Vieira	7	4	8
(United States) T Pawsat (United States) B Herr	5	6	6
(France) G Forget (United States) B Nagelsen	7	4	8

Third round
(United States) A Kohlberg (United States) E Burgin	5	1
(Netherlands) T Nijssen (Netherlands) M Bollegraf	7	6
(Brazil) D Marcelino (Brazil) A Vieira	2	3
(France) G Forget (United States) B Nagelsen	6	6

Quarterfinals
(Netherlands) T Nijssen (Netherlands) M Bollegraf	2	6	7
(France) G Forget (United States) B Nagelsen	6	2	5

==== Section 4 ====
First round
(New Zealand) D Lewis (United States) S Rehe	6	6
(Australia) J Stoltenberg (Australia) L Field	1	1
(United States) B Cox (United States) C Benjamin	7	6
(Argentina) G Luza (Switzerland) C Cohen	5	3
(Australia) B Drewett (United States) K Horvath	6	3	4
(Netherlands) M Schapers (Netherlands) B Schultz	3	6	6
(United States) E Korita (United States) P Barg	7	6
(France) A Boetsch (France) E Derly	6	4
(Brazil) C Motta (Brazil) N Dias	4	6
(United States) R Reneberg (United States) M Louie Harper	6	7
(United States) B Levine (France) C Suire	6	2	9
(United States) C Hooper (United States) P Smith	4	6	7

Second round
(Denmark) M Mortensen (Denmark) T Scheuer-Larsen	6	6
(New Zealand) D Lewis (United States) S Rehe	3	3
(United States) B Cox (United States) C Benjamin	7	6	5
(Netherlands) M Schapers (Netherlands) B Schultz	6	7	7
(United States) E Korita (United States) P Barg	6	6
(United States) R Reneberg (United States) M Louie Harper	4	4
(United States) B Levine (France) C Suire	1	5
(United States) T Witsken (United States) P Shriver	6	7

Third round
(Denmark) M Mortensen (Denmark) T Scheuer-Larsen	4	6	3
(Netherlands) M Schapers (Netherlands) B Schultz	6	3	6
(United States) E Korita (United States) P Barg	6	7
(United States) T Witsken (United States) P Shriver	2	6

Quarterfinals
(Netherlands) M Schapers (Netherlands) B Schultz	6	6
(United States) E Korita (United States) P Barg	2	4
