= 1986 Brazilian Open =

- Date: 8–15 December
- Edition: 4th
- Category: 1
- Draw: 56S / 24D
- Prize money: $50,000
- Surface: Clay
- Location: São Paulo, Brazil

Champions

Singles
- (United States) Vicki Nelson-Dunbar

Doubles
- (Brazil) Neige Dias / (Brazil) Patricia Medrado
- Brasil Open

The 1986 Brazilian Open was a women's tennis tournament played on outdoor clay courts in São Paulo in Brazil and was part of the Category 1 tier of the 1987 Virginia Slims World Championship Series. It was the fourth edition of the tournament and was held from 8 December through 15 December 1986. Eighth-seeded Vicki Nelson-Dunbar won the singles title.

== Finals ==
=== Singles ===
(United States) Vicki Nelson-Dunbar defeated (United States) Jenny Klitch 6–2, 7–6^{(7–1)}

- It was Vicki Nelson-Dunbar's only singles title of her career.

=== Doubles ===
(Brazil) Niege Dias / (Brazil) Patricia Medrado defeated (Peru) Laura Gildemeister / (Austria) Petra Huber 4–6, 6–4, 7–6^{(8–6)}

- It was Dias' only doubles title of her career. It was Medrado's only doubles title of the year and the 5th and last of her career.
