= 1989 Spanish Open =

- Date: 25–30 April
- Edition: 8th
- Category: Category 2
- Draw: 32S / 16D
- Prize money: $100,000
- Surface: Clay / outdoor
- Location: Barcelona, Spain
- Venue: Real Club de Tenis Barcelona

Champions

Singles
- (Spain) Arantxa Sánchez

Doubles
- (Czechoslovakia) Jana Novotná / (Denmark) Tine Scheuer-Larsen
← 1988 ·	Spanish Open	· 1990 →

The 1989 Spanish Open was a women's tennis tournament played on outdoor clay courts at the Real Club de Tenis Barcelona in Barcelona in Spain that was part of the Category 2 tier of the 1989 WTA Tour. It was the eighth edition of the tournament and was held from 25 April until 30 April 1989. Second-seeded Arantxa Sánchez won the singles title.

== Finals ==
=== Singles ===
(Spain) Arantxa Sánchez defeated (Canada) Helen Kelesi 6–2, 5–7, 6–1

- It was Sánchez's 1st singles title of the year and the 2nd of her career.

=== Doubles ===
(Czechoslovakia) Jana Novotná / (Denmark) Tine Scheuer-Larsen defeated (Spain) Arantxa Sánchez / (Austria) Judith Wiesner 6–2, 2–6, 7–6^{(7–3)}

- It was Novotná's 5th title of the year and the 17th of her career. It was Scheuer-Larsen's 1st title of the year and the 5th of her career.
