= 1989 Spanish Open – Singles =

Singles
- 1989 Spanish Open
- 1988 Champion: (Brazil) Niege Dias

Final
- Champion: (Spain) Arantxa Sánchez
- Runner-up: (Canada) Helen Kelesi
- Score: 6–2, 5–7, 6–1

Details
- Draw: 32
- Seeds: 8

Events
Singles	Doubles
← 1988 ·	Spanish Open	· 1990 →

Niege Dias was the defending champion but lost in the second round to Tine Scheuer-Larsen.

Arantxa Sánchez won in the final 6–2, 5–7, 6–1 against Helen Kelesi.

== Seeds ==
A champion seed is indicated in bold text while text in italics indicates the round in which that seed was eliminated.

1. (Canada) Helen Kelesi (final)
2. (Spain) **Arantxa Sánchez (champion)**
3. (Czechoslovakia) Jana Novotná (semifinals)
4. (West Germany) Sylvia Hanika (quarterfinals)
5. (Italy) Raffaella Reggi (quarterfinals)
6. (Austria) Judith Wiesner (first round)
7. (Austria) Barbara Paulus (second round)
8. (Brazil) Niege Dias (second round)

== Draw ==
=== Key ===
- Q = Qualifier
- WC = Wild card
- LL = Lucky loser
- Alt = Alternate
- SE = Special exempt
- PR = Protected ranking
- ITF = ITF entry
- JE = Junior exempt
- w/o = Walkover
- r = Retired
- d = Defaulted
- SR = Special ranking

First round
1	(Canada) **H Kelesi**	**6**	**6**
(Spain) I Varas	2	3
(France) K Quentrec	2	2
(Italy) **L Golarsa**	**6**	**6**
(Italy) F Bonsignori	4	6
Q	(Italy) **S Isidori**	**6**	**7**
(Argentina) A Villagrán	4	**6**	3
5	(Italy) **R Reggi**	**6**	2	**6**
3	(Czechoslovakia) **J Novotná**	**6**	**6**
(France) N Guerrée	2	4
Q	(Austria) P Ritter	3	3
(France) **J Halard**	**6**	**6**
(Denmark) **T Scheuer-Larsen**	**6**	**6**
(Netherlands) N Jagerman	3	4
(West Germany) S Meier	**7**	3	1
8	(Brazil) **N Dias**	6	**6**	**6**
7	(Austria) **B Paulus**	**6**	2	**6**
(Brazil) A Vieira	3	**6**	1
(France) A Dechaume	2	**7**	4
Q	(Czechoslovakia) **E Švíglerová**	**6**	6	**6**
(West Germany) **S Hack**	**6**	**6**
Q	(Spain) J Souto	2	1
(Argentina) M Paz	3	**7**	6
4	(West Germany) **S Hanika**	**6**	6	**7**
6	(Austria) J Wiesner	**6**	2	3
(Italy) **B Romanò**	3	**6**	**6**
(France) C Suire	2	3
(Italy) **S La Fratta**	**6**	**6**
(Argentina) C Tessi	5	2
(West Germany) **V Martinek**	**7**	**6**
(West Germany) S Auer	2	3
2	(Spain) **A Sánchez**	**6**	**6**

Second round
1	(Canada) **H Kelesi**	**6**	3	**6**
(Italy) L Golarsa	1	**6**	1
Q	(Italy) S Isidori	1	4
5	(Italy) **R Reggi**	**6**	**6**
3	(Czechoslovakia) **J Novotná**	**7**	**7**
(France) J Halard	6	5
(Denmark) **T Scheuer-Larsen**	**6**	**6**
8	(Brazil) N Dias	2	4
7	(Austria) B Paulus	**6**	1	2
Q	(Czechoslovakia) **E Švíglerová**	3	**6**	**6**
(West Germany) S Hack	3	3
4	(West Germany) **S Hanika**	**6**	**6**
(Italy) **B Romanò**	**6**	6	**6**
(Italy) S La Fratta	2	**7**	2
(West Germany) V Martinek	1	2
2	(Spain) **A Sánchez**	**6**	**6**

Quarterfinals
1	(Canada) **H Kelesi**	**6**	4	**6**
5	(Italy) R Reggi	4	**6**	3
3	(Czechoslovakia) **J Novotná**	**6**	**6**
(Denmark) T Scheuer-Larsen	2	1
Q	(Czechoslovakia) **E Švíglerová**	2	**6**	**4**
4	(West Germany) S Hanika	**6**	3	2/r
(Italy) B Romanò	4	1
2	(Spain) **A Sánchez**	**6**	**6**

Semifinals
1	(Canada) **H Kelesi**	4	**6**	**6**
3	(Czechoslovakia) J Novotná	**6**	4	2
Q	(Czechoslovakia) E Švíglerová	4	3
2	(Spain) **A Sánchez**	**6**	**6**

Final
1	(Canada) Helen Kelesi	2	**7**	1
2	(Spain) **Arantxa Sánchez**	**6**	5	**6**
