= Margarita Vaquero =

Spanish tennis player (born 1965)

- Country (sports): Spain
- Born: 9 October 1965 (age 59); Seville, Spain

Singles
- Career record: 0–0

Grand Slam singles results
- French Open Junior: 1R (1983)

Doubles
- Career record: 1–2
Medal record
Mediterranean Games
Gold medal – first place	1983 Casablanca	Women's Doubles

Margarita Vaquero Guitarte (born 9 October 1965) is a Spanish former professional tennis and padel player who won a gold medal at the 1983 Mediterranean Games.

On the WTA Tour, she featured twice in the doubles main draw at the Spanish Open (in 1988 and 1989), on both occasions partnering Inmaculada Varas.
