= María José Llorca =

Spanish tennis player (born 1970)

- Full name: María José Llorca
- Country (sports): Spain
- Born: 3 March 1970 (age 55)
- Plays: Right-handed
- Prize money: $33,031

Singles
- Highest ranking: No. 184 (26 October 1987)

Doubles
- Highest ranking: No. 157 (9 May 1988)

Grand Slam doubles results
- French Open: 1R (1988)

Grand Slam mixed doubles results
- French Open: 1R (1988)

María José Llorca (born 3 March 1970) is a former professional tennis player from Spain.

== Biography ==
Llorca is originally from Valencia and was trained in Barcelona as a junior.

A a right-handed player, she appeared in a total of four Federation Cup ties for Spain, the first two in 1986 when she was still only 16. In 1987 she featured in another two ties, including a World Group second round fixture against Australia which they lost, despite Llorca winning the opening rubber against Anne Minter.

From 1987 to 1991 she competed on the WTA Tour. She and Anna-Karin Olsson were runners-up in the doubles at the 1988 Spanish Open, which included a win over top seeds Bettina Fulco and Arantxa Sanchez Vicario.

Both of her grand slam main draw appearances came at the 1988 French Open, where she featured in the main draw of the women's doubles and mixed doubles, partnering Alison Scott and Jordi Arrese respectively.

In 2003 she took up the sport of padel tennis and was ranked as high as two in the world, before retiring in 2009.

== WTA Tour finals ==
=== Doubles (0–1) ===
| Result | Date | Tournament | Tier | Surface | Partner | Opponents | Score |
|---|---|---|---|---|---|---|---|
| Loss | May, 1988 | Barcelona, Spain | Category 1 | Clay | (Sweden) Anna-Karin Olsson | (Czechoslovakia) Iva Budařová (Belgium) Sandra Wasserman | 6–1, 3–6, 2–6 |

== ITF finals ==
=== Singles: 6 (3-3) ===
$100,000 tournaments
$75,000 tournaments
$50,000 tournaments
$25,000 tournaments
$10,000 tournaments

| Result | No. | Date | Tournament | Surface | Opponent | Score |
|---|---|---|---|---|---|---|
| Loss | 1. | 8 September 1986 | Lisbon, Portugal | Clay | (United Kingdom) Clare Wood | 2–6, 2–6 |
| Win | 2. | 27 April 1987 | Sutton, United Kingdom | Hard | (France) Sybille Niox-Château | 6–4, 4–6, 7–5 |
| Win | 3. | 11 May 1987 | Lee-on-the-Solent, United Kingdom | Clay | (United States) Elizabeth Galphin | 6–1, 3–6, 6–1 |
| Win | 4. | 21 September 1987 | Valencia, Spain | Clay | (Spain) Inmaculada Varas | 2–6, 6–1, 6–2 |
| Loss | 5. | 2 July 1990 | Cherbourg, France | Clay | (France) Alexandra Fusai | 3–6, 6–2, 3–6 |
| Loss | 6. | 30 July 1990 | Vigo, Spain | Clay | (France) Catherine Mothes | 6–4, 1–6, 1–6 |

=== Doubles: 5 (4–1) ===
| Result | No. | Date | Tournament | Surface | Partner | Opponents | Score |
|---|---|---|---|---|---|---|---|
| Win | 1. | 8 September 1986 | Lisbon, Portugal | Clay | (Spain) Ninoska Souto | (Mexico) Claudia Hernández (Hong Kong) Patricia Hy | 6–1, 4–6, 6–4 |
| Loss | 2. | 21 September 1987 | Valencia, Spain | Clay | (Spain) Inmaculada Varas | (Spain) Rosa Bielsa (Spain) Elena Guerra | 3–6, 6–3, 3–6 |
| Win | 3. | 15 May 1989 | Jaffa, Israel | Hard | (Israel) Ilana Berger | (Finland) Anne Aallonen (Brazil) Luciana Tella | 6–3, 6–2 |
| Win | 4. | 23 July 1990 | A Coruña, Spain | Clay | (Spain) Ana Belen Quintana | (Chile) Nathalie Rodríguez (France) Valerie Ledroff | 3–6, 6–3, 7–5 |
| Win | 5. | 30 July 1990 | Vigo, Spain | Clay | (Spain) Ana Segura | (Spain) Eva Bes (Spain) Virginia Ruano Pascual | 6–3, 6–4 |

== See also ==
- List of Spain Fed Cup team representatives
