= Spanish Open (tennis) =

Defunct tennis tournament
- Event name: Spanish Championships (1972–78); Spanish Open (1985–94); Ford Spanish Open (1995)
- Tour: WTA Tour
- Founded: 1972
- Abolished: 1995
- Editions: 14
- Surface: Clay / outdoor

The Spanish Open is a defunct WTA Tour affiliated women's tennis tournament played from 1972 to 1995. It was held at the Real Club de Tenis Barcelona in Barcelona in Catalonia, Spain and played on outdoor clay courts. It was a Tier V event from 1988 to 1989, a Tier IV event in 1990, a Tier III event from 1991 to 1992 and a Tier II event from 1993 to 1995.

In the 1970s the event was known as the Spanish Championships before becoming an Open in the 1980s and 1990s. It was replaced on the WTA Tour by the Madrid Open in 1996.

== Finals ==
=== Singles ===
(incomplete roll)

Year	Location	Champions	Runners-up	Score
1907	San Sebastian	(Spain) Margarita Jimenez	(Spain) Alecia Jimenez	6–1, 6–2
1911	San Sebastian	(United Kingdom) Mary Towler	(Germany) Anita Heimann Lent	3–6, 6–4, 6–3
1912	San Sebastian	(Spain) Luisa Marnet	(United Kingdom) Millicent Elwell	6–1, 6–4
1920	San Sebastian	(France) Daisy Speranza	(Spain) Mlle Castejon	6–4, 7–5
1923	San Sebastian	(France) Suzanne Lenglen	(France) Germaine Le Conte	6–1, 6–0
1924	San Sebastian	(France) Daisy Speranza (2)	(France) Elisabeth Raoul-Duval	6–3, 6–1
1927	San Sebastian	(France) Daisy Speranza (3)	(France) Mlle Carnet	6–4, 3–6, 6–2
1929	San Sebastian	(France) Ida Adamoff	(Spain) María de Lerena-de Morales	6–0, 6–2
1931	Santander	(Spain) Bella Duttón de Pons	(Spain) Guadalupe Pombo	6–0, 6–3
1934	San Sebastian	(France) Simonne Mathieu	(France) Simone Iribarne	6–1, 6–4
1935	San Sebastian	(France) Simone Iribarne	(Belgium) Nelly Adamson	6–4, 3–6, 6–2
1936	Barcelona	(Spain) Josefa de Chavarri	(Germany) Ruth Kamann	6–1, 7–5
1940	Santander	(Spain) Lili de Alvarez	(Spain) Josefa de Chavarri	6–0, 2–6, 6–3
1963	San Sebastian	(Brazil) Mary Habicht	(Spain) Pilar Barril	3–6, 6–4, 6–2
1967	San Sebastian	(Spain) Carmen Mandarino	(United States) Alice Tym	1–6, 6–4, 6–4
1968	Barcelona	(Chile) Michelle Rodriguez	(West Germany) Kerstin Seelbach	7–5, 6–4
↓ Open Era ↓
1969	Barcelona	(Australia) Kerry Melville	(Australia) Helen Gourlay	5–7, 6–4, 7–5
1970	Barcelona	(West Germany) Helga Hosl	(Australia) Sue Alexander	6–1, 6–1
1971	Barcelona	(West Germany) Helga Hosl (2)	(Chile) Ana Maria Arias Pinto Bravo	6–2, 6–1
1972	Barcelona	(France) Gail Chanfreau	(France) Nathalie Fuchs	6–1, 6–4
1973	Barcelona	(West Germany) Helga Hosl (3)	(France) Nathalie Fuchs	6–2, 7–5
1974	Barcelona	(France) Nathalie Fuchs	(United Kingdom) Glynis Coles	7–5, 8–6
1975	Barcelona	(United States) Janice Metcalf	(West Germany) Iris Riedel	4–6, 6–1, 6–4
1976	Barcelona	(Czechoslovakia) Renáta Tomanová	(Romania) Virginia Ruzici	3–6, 6–4, 6–2
1977	Barcelona	(Czechoslovakia) Regina Marsikova	(Romania) Mariana Simionescu	6–3, 6–4
1978	Barcelona	(Czechoslovakia) Hana Mandlíková	(Italy) Sabina Simmonds	6–1, 5–7, 6–3
1979	Barcelona	(Sweden) Lena Sandin	(Czechoslovakia) Iva Budarova	6–2, 6–3
1980	Barcelona	(Netherlands) Nora Blom Lauteslager	(Spain) Carmen Perea	7–6, 6–3
1985	Barcelona	(Italy) Sandra Cecchini	(Italy) Raffaella Reggi	6–3, 6–4
1986	Barcelona	(Austria) Petra Huber	(Italy) Laura Garrone	7–6^{(7–4)}, 6–0
1987	Not held			
1988	Barcelona	(Brazil) Neige Dias	(Argentina) Bettina Fulco	6–3, 6–3
1989	Barcelona	(Spain) Arantxa Sánchez	(Canada) Helen Kelesi	6–2, 5–7, 6–1
1990	Barcelona	(Spain) Arantxa Sánchez Vicario (2)	(West Germany) Isabel Cueto	6–4, 6–2
1991	Barcelona	(Spain) Conchita Martínez	(Switzerland) Manuela Maleeva-Fragnière	6–4, 6–1
1992	Barcelona	(Federal Republic of Yugoslavia) Monica Seles	(Spain) Arantxa Sánchez Vicario	3–6, 6–2, 6–3
1993	Barcelona	(Spain) Arantxa Sánchez Vicario (3)	(Spain) Conchita Martínez	6–1, 6–4
1994	Barcelona	(Spain) Arantxa Sánchez Vicario (4)	(Croatia) Iva Majoli	6–0, 6–2
1995	Barcelona	(Spain) Arantxa Sánchez Vicario	(Croatia) Iva Majoli	5–7, 6–0, 6–2

=== Doubles ===
Year	Champions	Runners-up	Score
1972	(France) Gail Sherriff (France) Nathalie Fuchs	(Belgium) Michele Gurdal (Belgium) Monique Van Haver	6–4, 6–2
1973 - 1975	Not held		
1976	(Romania) Florența Mihai (Brazil) Patricia Medrado	(France) Nathalie Fuchs (Belgium) Michele Gurdal	6–2, 6–4
1977	Not held		
1978	Not available		
1979 - 1984	Not held		
1985	(Switzerland) Petra Jauch-Delhees (Brazil) Patricia Medrado	(United States) Penny Barg (Argentina) Adriana Villagrán	6–1, 6–0
1986	(Czechoslovakia) Iva Budařová (France) Catherine Tanvier	(Austria) Petra Huber (West Germany) Petra Keppeler	6–2, 6–1
1987	Not held		
1988	(Czechoslovakia) Iva Budařová (Belgium) Sandra Wasserman	(Sweden) Anna-Karin Olsson (Spain) María José Llorca	1–6, 6–3, 6–2
1989	(Czechoslovakia) Jana Novotná (Denmark) Tine Scheuer-Larsen	(Spain) Arantxa Sánchez (Austria) Judith Wiesner	6–2, 2–6, 7–6^{(7–3)}
1990	(Argentina) Mercedes Paz (Spain) Arantxa Sánchez Vicario	(Socialist Federal Republic of Yugoslavia) Sabrina Goleš (Argentina) Patricia Tarabini	6–7^{(7–9)}, 6–2, 6–1
1991	(United States) Martina Navratilova (Spain) Arantxa Sánchez Vicario	(France) Nathalie Tauziat (Austria) Judith Wiesner	6–1, 6–3
1992	(Spain) Conchita Martínez (Spain) Arantxa Sánchez Vicario	(France) Nathalie Tauziat (Austria) Judith Wiesner	6–4, 6–1
1993	(Spain) Conchita Martínez (Spain) Arantxa Sánchez Vicario	(Bulgaria) Magdalena Maleeva (Switzerland) Manuela Maleeva-Fragnière	4–6, 6–1, 6–0
1994	(Latvia) Larisa Neiland (Spain) Arantxa Sánchez Vicario	(France) Julie Halard (France) Nathalie Tauziat	6–2, 6–4
1995	(Latvia) Larisa Neiland (Spain) Arantxa Sánchez Vicario	(South Africa) Mariaan de Swardt (Croatia) Iva Majoli	7–5, 4–6, 7–5

== Event names ==
Official (English)

- International Championships of Spain (1904-1936) men & women
- Spanish International Championships (1940-1967) men & women
- Spanish International Championships & Count of Godo Trophy (1968-1980) men & women
- Spanish International Championships & Count of Godo Trophy (1981-2007) men
- Spanish International Championships (1985-2002) women

Official (Spanish)

- Campeonatos Internacionales de España (1904-1967) men & women
- Campeonatos Internacionales de España & Trofeo Conde de Godó (1968-1980) men & women
- Campeonatos Internacionales de España & Trofeo Conde de Godó(1981-2007) men
- Campeonatos Internacionales de España (1985-2002) women
