= Marielle Rooimans =

Dutch tennis player

Mariëlle Rooimans (born 28 July 1968) is a Dutch former professional tennis player.

She has career-high WTA rankings of 232 in singles, achieved on 30 January 1989, and 235 in doubles, reached on 26 October 1987. Her twin sister Nicolette former tennis players.

She made her WTA Tour main-draw debut at the 1988 Spanish Open.

== ITF finals ==
=== Singles: 4 (2–2) ===
Outcome	No.	Date	Tournament	Surface	Opponent	Score
Runner–up	1.	13 March 1988	Haifa, Israel	Hard	(South Africa) Amanda Coetzer	6–3, 4–6, 4–6
Winner	1.	20 March 1988	Ashkelon, Israel	Hard	(South Africa) Amanda Coetzer	7–5, 7–6
Runner–up	2.	27 March 1988	Ramat HaSharon Israel	Hard	(South Africa) Amanda Coetzer	3–6, 1–6
Winner	2.	24 July 1988	Amsterdam, Netherlands	Clay	(Netherlands) Yvonne Grubben	6–2, 6–2

=== Doubles: 3 (2–1) ===
Outcome	No.	Date	Tournament	Surface	Partner	Opponents	Score
Runner-up	1.	11 October 1987	Makarska, Yugoslavia	Hard	(Netherlands) Nicolette Rooimans	(Austria) Karin Kschwendt (Netherlands) Amy van Buuren	3–6, 4–6
Winner	1.	23 October 1988	Buenos Aires, Argentina	Clay	(Netherlands) Nicolette Rooimans	(United States) Courtney Allen (United States) Jennifer Prah	6–2, 6–2
Winner	2.	30 October 1988	Montevideo, Uruguay	Clay	(Netherlands) Nicolette Rooimans	(United States) Alix Creek (United States) Erika deLone	6–2, 6–2
