= Mahela Gartner-Ockernahl =

German professional tennis player

- Country (sports): West Germany
- Born: 12 June 1969 (age 57)

Singles
- Highest ranking: No. 244 (14 Sep 1987)

Doubles
- Highest ranking: No. 365 (5 Jan 1987)

Mahela Gartner-Ockernahl (born 12 June 1969) is a German former professional tennis player. She originally competed under her maiden name Mahela Gartner.

Gartner reached a career high singles ranking of 244 and her best WTA Tour performance was a second round appearance at the 1986 Argentinian Open in Buenos Aires.
