= 1988 French Open – Men's doubles =

Men's doubles
- 1988 French Open

Final
- Champion: (Ecuador) Andrés Gómez (Spain) Emilio Sánchez
- Runner-up: (Australia) John Fitzgerald (Sweden) Anders Järryd
- Score: 6–3, 6–7, 6–4, 6–3

Details
- Draw: 64
- Seeds: 16

Events
Singles	men	women		boys	girls
Doubles	men	women	mixed	boys	girls
WC Singles	men	women	quad
WC Doubles	men	women	quad
Legends	−45	45+	women
← 1987 ·	French Open	· 1989 →

The men's doubles tournament at the 1988 French Open was held from 23 May until 5 June 1988 on the outdoor clay courts at the Stade Roland Garros in Paris, France. Andrés Gómez and Emilio Sánchez won the title, defeating John Fitzgerald and Anders Järryd in the final.

== Seeds ==
1. (United States) Ken Flach / (United States) Robert Seguso (quarterfinals)
2. (Australia) John Fitzgerald / (Sweden) Anders Järryd (final)
3. (France) Guy Forget / (Czechoslovakia) Tomáš Šmíd (first round)
4. (Mexico) Jorge Lozano / (United States) Todd Witsken (quarterfinals)
5. (Australia) Laurie Warder / (United States) Blaine Willenborg (third round)
6. (Ecuador) Andrés Gómez / (Spain) Emilio Sánchez (champions)
7. (New Zealand) Kelly Evernden / (United States) Johan Kriek (second round)
8. (United States) Rick Leach / (United States) Jim Pugh (quarterfinals)
9. (United States) Paul Annacone / (Australia) Brad Drewett (third round)
10. (United States) Andy Kohlberg / (United States) Robert Van't Hof (first round)
11. (Sweden) Joakim Nyström / (Sweden) Mikael Pernfors (third round)
12. (Australia) Wally Masur / (Australia) Mark Woodforde (semifinals)
13. (South Africa) Pieter Aldrich / (South Africa) Danie Visser (first round)
14. (United States) Steve Denton / (United States) Sherwood Stewart (second round)
15. (United States) Martin Davis / (United States) Tim Pawsat (third round)
16. (United Kingdom) Jeremy Bates / (Sweden) Peter Lundgren (first round)

== Draw ==
=== Key ===
- Q = Qualifier
- WC = Wild card
- LL = Lucky loser
- Alt = Alternate
- ITF = ITF entry
- PR = Protected ranking
- SR = Special ranking
- SE = Special exempt
- JE = Junior exempt
- JR = Junior Accelerator Programme entrant
- CO = College Accelerator Programme entrant
- NG = Next Gen Accelerator Program entrant
- w/o = Walkover
- r = Retired
- d = Defaulted

=== Finals ===
Quarterfinals
1	(United States) Ken Flach (United States) Robert Seguso	4	7	3
(Mexico) Leonardo Lavalle (Mexico) Agustín Moreno	6	6	6
(United States) Eric Korita (United States) Jon Levine	4	4
6	(Ecuador) Andrés Gómez (Spain) Emilio Sánchez	6	6
12	(Australia) Wally Masur (Australia) Mark Woodforde	6	6
4	(Mexico) Jorge Lozano (United States) Todd Witsken	3	4
8	(United States) Rick Leach (United States) Jim Pugh	6	7	1
2	(Australia) John Fitzgerald (Sweden) Anders Järryd	7	6	6

Semifinals
(Mexico) Leonardo Lavalle (Mexico) Agustín Moreno	3	4	3
6	(Ecuador) Andrés Gómez (Spain) Emilio Sánchez	6	6	6
12	(Australia) Wally Masur (Australia) Mark Woodforde	1	2	2
2	(Australia) John Fitzgerald (Sweden) Anders Järryd	6	6	6

Final
6	(Ecuador) Andrés Gómez (Spain) Emilio Sánchez	6	6	6	6
2	(Australia) John Fitzgerald (Sweden) Anders Järryd	3	7	4	3

=== Top half ===
==== Section 1 ====
First round
1	(United States) K Flach (United States) R Seguso	6	6
(Australia) D Macpherson (Australia) S Youl	0	4
(France) O Delaître (France) S Grenier	6	6
(France) T Champion (France) T Tulasne	4	4
(Australia) C Limberger (Italy) C Panatta	6	7
(Italy) S Colombo (Peru) C di Laura	4	6
(United States) B Cox (United States) T Siegel	3	6	1
15	(United States) M Davis (United States) T Pawsat	6	3	6
10	(United States) A Kohlberg (United States) R Van't Hof	5	4
(West Germany) T Meinecke (West Germany) R Osterthun	7	6
(Czechoslovakia) P Korda (Czechoslovakia) C Suk	6	6
(Sweden) M Gustafsson (Sweden) J Svensson	2	1
(United States) D Dowlen (United States) M Freeman	6	6	0
(Mexico) L Lavalle (Mexico) A Moreno	3	7	6
(United States) R Baxter (United States) P Chamberlin	7	1	2
7	(New Zealand) K Evernden (United States) J Kriek	6	6	6

Second round
1	(United States) K Flach (United States) R Seguso	7	6
(France) O Delaître (France) S Grenier	5	3
(Australia) C Limberger (Italy) C Panatta	3	6
15	(United States) M Davis (United States) T Pawsat	6	7
(West Germany) T Meinecke (West Germany) R Osterthun	6	5	7
(Czechoslovakia) P Korda (Czechoslovakia) C Suk	4	7	5
(Mexico) L Lavalle (Mexico) A Moreno	7	7
7	(New Zealand) K Evernden (United States) J Kriek	6	5

Third round
1	(United States) K Flach (United States) R Seguso	6	6
15	(United States) M Davis (United States) T Pawsat	3	3
(West Germany) T Meinecke (West Germany) R Osterthun	6	2	3
(Mexico) L Lavalle (Mexico) A Moreno	4	6	6

Quarterfinals
1	(United States) K Flach (United States) R Seguso	4	7	3
10	(Mexico) L Lavalle (Mexico) A Moreno	6	6	6

==== Section 2 ====
First round
3	(France) G Forget (Czechoslovakia) T Šmíd	6	6
(West Germany) E Jelen (West Germany) P Kühnen	7	7
(United States) J Arias (Italy) P Canè	7	2	6
(Canada) G Connell (United States) P Palandjian	5	6	3
(Argentina) M Ingaramo (Argentina) A Mancini	6	6
(United States) E Korita (United States) J Levine	7	7
(Brazil) C Motta (Netherlands) M Schapers	3	2
14	(United States) S Denton (United States) S Stewart	6	6
11	(Sweden) J Nyström (Sweden) M Pernfors	6	6
(Chile) R Acuña (United States) L Jensen	4	4
(Brazil) I Kley (Brazil) D Marcelino	7	6	4
(Argentina) J Frana (Argentina) C Miniussi	6	7	6
(Haiti) R Agénor (Argentina) G Pérez Roldán	3	3
(Brazil) G Barbosa (Brazil) M Menezes	6	6
(United States) C Hooper (United States) T Nelson	6	2
6	(Ecuador) A Gómez (Spain) E Sánchez	7	6

Second round
(West Germany) E Jelen (West Germany) P Kühnen	4	4
(United States) J Arias (Italy) P Canè	6	6
(United States) E Korita (United States) J Levine	6	6
14	(United States) S Denton (United States) S Stewart	4	3
11	(Sweden) J Nyström (Sweden) M Pernfors	6	7
(Argentina) J Frana (Argentina) C Miniussi	2	5
(Brazil) G Barbosa (Brazil) M Menezes	5	6
6	(Ecuador) A Gómez (Spain) E Sánchez	7	7

Third round
(United States) J Arias (Italy) P Canè	7	4	4
(United States) E Korita (United States) J Levine	5	6	6
11	(Sweden) J Nyström (Sweden) M Pernfors	1	6
6	(Ecuador) A Gómez (Spain) E Sánchez	6	7

Quarterfinals
(United States) E Korita (United States) J Levine	4	4
6	(Ecuador) A Gómez (Spain) E Sánchez	6	6

=== Bottom half ===
==== Section 3 ====
First round
5	(Australia) L Warder (United States) B Willenborg	6	6
(United States) R Reneberg (United States) L Shiras	3	4
(Australia) P Carter (New Zealand) D Lewis	6	7	3
(Switzerland) H Günthardt (Hungary) B Taróczy	7	4	6
(United Kingdom) A Castle (Argentina) R Saad	7	6
(Sweden) T Svantesson (United States) D Tarr	6	2
(France) JP Fleurian (France) E Winogradsky	5	3
12	(Australia) W Masur (Australia) M Woodforde	7	6
13	(South Africa) P Aldrich (South Africa) D Visser	2	3
(Australia) D Cahill (Israel) A Mansdorf	6	6
(Spain) J López-Maeso (Spain) A Tous	3	2
(United States) D Cassidy (United States) M Purcell	6	6
(Italy) O Camporese (Italy) D Nargiso	0	3
(Iran) M Bahrami (France) J Potier	6	6
(France) T Benhabiles (France) P Pech	3	2
4	(Mexico) J Lozano (United States) T Witsken	6	6

Second round
5	(Australia) L Warder (United States) B Willenborg	5	6	6
(Switzerland) H Günthardt (Hungary) B Taróczy	7	3	4
(United Kingdom) A Castle (Argentina) R Saad	6	1	7
12	(Australia) W Masur (Australia) M Woodforde	4	6	9
(Australia) D Cahill (Israel) A Mansdorf	6	6
(United States) D Cassidy (United States) M Purcell	4	4
(Iran) M Bahrami (France) J Potier	2	2
4	(Mexico) J Lozano (United States) T Witsken	6	6

Third round
5	(Australia) L Warder (United States) B Willenborg	6	2	1
12	(Australia) W Masur (Australia) M Woodforde	3	6	6
(Australia) D Cahill (Israel) A Mansdorf	2	4
4	(Mexico) J Lozano (United States) T Witsken	6	6

Quarterfinals
12	(Australia) W Masur (Australia) M Woodforde	6	6
4	(Mexico) J Lozano (United States) T Witsken	3	4

==== Section 4 ====
First round
8	(United States) R Leach (United States) J Pugh	3	7	6
(Switzerland) J Hlasek (Switzerland) C Mezzadri	6	6	2
(Czechoslovakia) J Čihák (Netherlands) T Nijssen	6	6
(Brazil) L Mattar (Uruguay) D Pérez	2	3
(France) A Boetsch (France) L Courteau	7	7
(Spain) T Carbonell (Spain) J Sánchez	5	6
(Italy) M Cierro (Italy) M Fioroni	4	5
9	(United States) P Annacone (Australia) B Drewett	6	7
16	(United Kingdom) J Bates (Sweden) P Lundgren	3	6	0
(Australia) J Stoltenberg (Australia) T Woodbridge	6	3	6
(United States) S Davis (United States) J Ross	5	6	6
(Czechoslovakia) K Nováček (Netherlands) M Oosting	7	2	8
(Sweden) J Gunnarsson (Denmark) M Mortensen	6	3	4
(Czechoslovakia) S Birner (Czechoslovakia) J Navrátil	3	6	6
(United States) M De Palmer (United States) G Donnelly	1	1
2	(Australia) J Fitzgerald (Sweden) A Järryd	6	6

Second round
8	(United States) R Leach (United States) J Pugh	6	6
(Czechoslovakia) J Čihák (Netherlands) T Nijssen	1	4
(France) A Boetsch (France) L Courteau	5	4
9	(United States) P Annacone (Australia) B Drewett	7	6
(Australia) J Stoltenberg (Australia) T Woodbridge	6	6
(Czechoslovakia) K Nováček (Netherlands) M Oosting	3	2
(Czechoslovakia) S Birner (Czechoslovakia) J Navrátil	6	6
2	(Australia) J Fitzgerald (Sweden) A Järryd	7	7

Third round
8	(United States) R Leach (United States) J Pugh	6	7
9	(United States) P Annacone (Australia) B Drewett	3	6
(Australia) J Stoltenberg (Australia) T Woodbridge	5	6	0
2	(Australia) J Fitzgerald (Sweden) A Järryd	7	2	6

Quarterfinals
8	(United States) R Leach (United States) J Pugh	6	7	1
2	(Australia) J Fitzgerald (Sweden) A Järryd	7	6	6
