= Rona Daniels =

American tennis player

- Country (sports): United States
- Born: July 8, 1969 (age 55)
- College: University of Miami

Singles
- Highest ranking: No. 242 (Sep 28, 1987)

Grand Slam singles results
- French Open: Q1 (1987)

Doubles
- Highest ranking: No. 197 (Dec 21, 1986)

Rona Daniels (born July 8, 1969) is an American former professional tennis player.

Daniels reached a best singles ranking of 242 on the professional tour and her best WTA Tour performance was a third round appearance at the 1986 Argentinian Open. She played collegiate tennis for the University of Miami.

Since leaving professional tennis she has had a career in real estate.
