= Nicolette Rooimans =

Dutch tennis player

Nicolette Rooimans (born 28 July 1968) is a Dutch former professional tennis player.

She has career-high WTA rankings of 249 in singles, achieved on 6 June 1988, and 245 in doubles, reached on 11 April 1988. Her twin sister Marielle former tennis players.

She made her WTA Tour main-draw debut at the 1988 Spanish Open.

== ITF finals ==
=== Singles: 4 (2–2) ===
| Result | No. | Date | Tournament | Surface | Opponent | Score |
|---|---|---|---|---|---|---|
| Win | 1. | 1 September 1986 | Wels, Austria | Hard | (Austria) Karin Oberleitner | 4–6, 6–3, 6–1 |
| Loss | 1. | 24 January 1988 | Denain, France | Clay | (France) Karine Quentrec | 1–6, 3–4 ret. |
| Loss | 2. | 6 March 1988 | Tel Aviv, Israel | Hard | (Brazil) Themis Zambrzycki | 6–2, 5–7, 1–6 |
| Win | 2. | 4 March 1990 | Ashkelon, Israel | Hard | (Netherlands) Miriam Oremans | 6–3, 4–6, 7–6 |

=== Doubles: 5 (3–2) ===
| Result | No. | Date | Tournament | Surface | Partner | Opponents | Score |
|---|---|---|---|---|---|---|---|
| Loss | 1. | 11 October 1987 | Makarska, Yugoslavia | Hard | (Netherlands) Marielle Rooimans | (Austria) Karin Kschwendt (Netherlands) Amy van Buuren | 3–6, 4–6 |
| Win | 1. | 23 October 1988 | Buenos Aires, Argentina | Clay | (Netherlands) Marielle Rooimans | (United States) Courtney Allen (United States) Jennifer Prah | 6–2, 6–2 |
| Win | 2. | 30 October 1988 | Montevideo, Uruguay | Clay | (Netherlands) Marielle Rooimans | (United States) Alix Creek (United States) Erika deLone | 6–2, 6–2 |
| Loss | 2. | 14 May 1990 | Jaffa, Israel | Hard | (Netherlands) Miriam Oremans | (South Africa) Michelle Anderson (South Africa) Robyn Field | 5–7, 4–6 |
| Win | 3. | 6 June 1992 | Velp, Netherlands | Clay | (Netherlands) Linda Niemantsverdriet | (Czech Republic) Petra Raclavská (United States) Tara Collins | 6–4, 6–1 |
