= Caterina Nozzoli =

Italian tennis player

- Country (sports): Italy
- Born: 29 June 1967 (age 57)
- Prize money: $41,754

Singles
- Highest ranking: No. 130 (27 April 1987)

Grand Slam singles results
- French Open: 1R (1987)

Doubles
- Highest ranking: No. 128 (21 December 1986)

Grand Slam doubles results
- French Open: 1R (1987)

Caterina Nozzoli (born 29 June 1967) is an Italian former professional tennis player.

Nozzoli played on the WTA Tour in the late 1980s and early 1990s, reaching a career high singles ranking of 130 in the world. Her best performance came early in her career, a semi-final appearance at the 1985 Italian Open. At the 1987 French Open she featured in the main draw of both the women's singles and doubles.

A member of Italy's Federation Cup squad in 1987, Nozzoli played a dead rubber doubles match in their World Group round one win over Belgium (with Laura Garrone).

She married tennis player Antonio Padovani.

== ITF finals ==
$25,000 tournaments
$10,000 tournaments

=== Singles: 2 (1–1) ===
Results	No.	Date	Tournament	Surface	Opponent	Score
Loss	1.	15 August 1988	Caltagirone, Italy	Clay	(Italy) Simona Isidori	4–6, 5–7
Win	1.	20 March 1989	Marsa, Malta	Hard	(West Germany) Andrea Müller	6–0, 4–6, 6–2

=== Doubles: 4 (2–2) ===
Results	No.	Date	Tournament	Surface	Partner	Opponents	Score
Win	1.	20 March 1989	Marsa, Malta	Hard	(Netherlands) Pascale Druyts	(United Kingdom) Belinda Borneo (Netherlands) Amy van Buuren	6–3, 3–6, 6–3
Loss	1.	29 May 1989	Florence, Italy	Clay	(Italy) Nathalie Baudone	(South Africa) Michelle Anderson (Finland) Nanne Dahlman	3–6, 3–6
Loss	2.	25 June 1990	Caltagirone, Italy	Clay	(Italy) Simona Isidori	(United States) Jennifer Fuchs (Japan) Ei Iida	1–6, 1–6
Win	2.	13 May 1991	Francavilla, Italy	Clay	(Italy) Marzia Grossi	(Paraguay) Viviana Valdovinos (United States) Jolene Watanabe-Giltz	6–1, 6–3

== See also ==
- List of Italy Fed Cup team representatives
