= Anna-Karin Olsson =

Swedish tennis and bandy player

- Country (sports): Sweden
- Born: 10 May 1967 (age 57); Kil, Sweden
- Retired: 1990
- Prize money: $24,470

Singles
- Career titles: 1 ITF
- Highest ranking: No. 248 (21 December 1986)

Doubles
- Career titles: 1 ITF
- Highest ranking: No. 123 (29 August 1988)

Grand Slam doubles results
- French Open: 1R (1988)
- Wimbledon: Q2 (1986)
- US Open: 1R (1988)

Anna-Karin Olsson (born 10 May 1967) is a Swedish former professional tennis and bandy player.

== Biography ==
Olsson grew up in Värmland.

As a tennis player, Olsson competed on the professional tour in the 1980s and had a best singles ranking of 248. She was most successful as a doubles player, reaching the final of the 1988 Spanish Open and featuring in the main draw of both the French Open and US Open that year.

She played bandy as a forward and started her career at IF Boltic, where she remained until 1989. From 1989 from 2004 she played for AIK and was a member of eight championship winning AIK teams, giving her a record 12 titles in total, having won four while at IF Boltic. She was the league's top shooter in 1998, 1999 and 2001. In 2016 she was inducted into the Swedish Bandy Hall of Fame.

== WTA Tour finals ==
=== Doubles (0–1) ===
Result	Date	Tournament	Tier	Surface	Partner	Opponents	Score
Loss	May, 1988	Barcelona, Spain	Category 1	Clay	(Spain) María José Llorca	(Czechoslovakia) Iva Budařová (Belgium) Sandra Wasserman	6–1, 3–6, 2–6

== ITF finals ==
=== Singles (1–1) ===
$25,000 tournaments
$10,000 tournaments

Result	No.	Date	Tournament	Surface	Opponent	Score
Loss	1.	15 June 1987	Salerno, Italy	Clay	(Italy) Laura Lapi	3–6, 2–6
Win	2.	6 February 1989	Stavanger, Norway	Hard	(Finland) Nanne Dahlman	6–3, 6–3

=== Doubles (1-2) ===
Result	No.	Date	Tournament	Surface	Partner	Opponents	Score
Loss	1.	15 July 1985	Båstad, Sweden	Clay	(Sweden) Karolina Karlsson	(Sweden) Maria Lindström (Sweden) Elisabeth Ekblom	4–6, 4–6
Loss	2.	23 March 1987	Melbourne, Australia	Hard	(Australia) Colleen Carney	(Australia) Louise Field (New Zealand) Belinda Cordwell	2–6, 6–3, 3-6
Win	3.	1 February 1988	Tapiola, Finland	Hard	(Netherlands) Titia Wilmink	(United States) Jackie Joseph (Netherlands) Ingrid Peltzer	6–3, 6–2
