= 1986 Argentinian Open =

1986 WTA Argentine Open
- Date: 1–8 December
- Edition: 1st
- Category: 1
- Draw: 56S / 24D
- Prize money: $50,000
- Surface: Clay / outdoors
- Location: Buenos Aires, Argentina
- Venue: Buenos Aires Lawn Tennis Club

Champions

Singles
- (Argentina) Gabriela Sabatini

Doubles
- (United States) Lori McNeil / (Argentina) Gabriela Sabatini
WTA Argentine Open	· 1987 →

The 1986 WTA Argentine Open was a women's tennis tournament played on outdoor clay courts at the Buenos Aires Lawn Tennis Club in Buenos Aires, Argentina and was part of the Category 1 tier of the 1987 Virginia Slims World Championship Series. It was the inaugural edition of the tournament and was held from 1 December until 8 December 1986. First-seeded Gabriela Sabatini won the singles title.

== Finals ==
=== Singles ===
(Argentina) Gabriela Sabatini defeated (Spain) Arantxa Sánchez Vicario 6–1, 6–1

- It was Sabatini's only singles title of the year and the 2nd of her career.

=== Doubles ===
(United States) Lori McNeil / (Argentina) Mercedes Paz defeated (Netherlands) Manon Bollegraf / (Netherlands) Nicole Jagerman 6–1, 2–6, 6–1
