= 1988 French Open =

- Date: 23 May – 5 June 1988
- Edition: 87
- Category: 58th Grand Slam (ITF)
- Surface: Clay
- Location: Paris (XVI^{e}), France
- Venue: Stade Roland Garros

Champions

Men's singles
- (Sweden) Mats Wilander

Women's singles
- (West Germany) Steffi Graf

Men's doubles
- (Ecuador) Andrés Gómez / (Spain) Emilio Sánchez Vicario

Women's doubles
- (United States) Martina Navratilova / (United States) Pam Shriver

Mixed doubles
- (United States) Lori McNeil / (Mexico) Jorge Lozano
- French Open

The 1988 French Open was a tennis tournament that took place on the outdoor clay courts at the Stade Roland Garros in Paris, France. The tournament was held from 23 May until 5 June. It was the 87th staging of the French Open, and the second Grand Slam tennis event of 1988.

== Seniors ==
=== Men's singles ===
(Sweden) Mats Wilander defeated (France) Henri Leconte, 7–5, 6–2, 6–1

- It was Wilander's 6th career Grand Slam title, and his 3rd (and last) French Open title.

=== Women's singles ===
(West Germany) Steffi Graf defeated (Soviet Union) Natalia Zvereva, 6–0, 6–0

- This was the shortest women's singles Grand Slam final in the Open Era; Graf won the match in 32 minutes.
- It was Graf's 3rd career Grand Slam title, and her 2nd (consecutive) French Open title.

=== Men's doubles ===
(Ecuador) Andrés Gómez / (Spain) Emilio Sánchez Vicario defeated (Australia) John Fitzgerald / (Sweden) Anders Järryd, 6–3, 6–7, 6–4, 6–3

=== Women's doubles ===
(United States) Martina Navratilova / (United States) Pam Shriver defeated (West Germany) Claudia Kohde-Kilsch / (Czechoslovakia) Helena Suková, 6–2, 7–5

=== Mixed doubles ===
(United States) Lori McNeil / (Mexico) Jorge Lozano defeated (Netherlands) Brenda Schultz-McCarthy / (Netherlands) Michiel Schapers, 7–5, 6–2

== Juniors ==
=== Boys' singles ===
(Venezuela) Nicolás Pereira defeated (Sweden) Magnus Larsson, 7–6, 6–3

=== Girls' singles ===
(France) Julie Halard defeated (United States) Andrea Farley, 6–2, 4–6, 7–5

=== Boys' doubles ===
(Australia) Jason Stoltenberg / (Australia) Todd Woodbridge defeated (Italy) Cristiano Caratti / (Croatia) Goran Ivanišević, 7–6, 7–5

=== Girls' doubles ===
(France) Alexia Dechaume / (France) Emmanuelle Derly defeated (France) Julie Halard / (France) Maïder Laval, 6–4, 3–6, 6–3

== Prize money ==
Event		W	F	SF	QF	4R	3R	2R	1R
Singles	Men	FF1,500,240	FF750,120	FF375,060	FF190,030	FF100,019	FF56,009	FF33,015	FF20,123
Singles	Women	FF1,436,390	FF731,700	FF362,440	FF183,450	FF89,850	FF46,330	FF24,540	FF12,750

Total prize money for the event was FF20,963,950.

Preceded by 1988 Australian Open	Grand Slams	Succeeded by 1988 Wimbledon Championships
