= Vicki Nelson-Dunbar =

American tennis player

- Country (sports): United States
- Born: September 25, 1962 (age 63) Wooster, Ohio, U.S.
- Height: 5 ft 6 in (1.68 m)
- Plays: Right-handed
- Prize money: US$ 201,531

Singles
- Career record: 58–88
- Career titles: 1
- Highest ranking: No. 60 (20 August 1984)

Grand Slam singles results
- Australian Open: 2R (1987)
- French Open: 2R (1984, 1985, 1986)
- Wimbledon: 1R (1982, 1983, 1984, 1985, 1986, 1987)
- US Open: 4R (1982)

Doubles
- Career record: 14–58
- Career titles: 0
- Highest ranking: No. 140 (9 November 1987)

Grand Slam doubles results
- Australian Open: 2R (1984)
- French Open: 1R (1983, 1984, 1985, 1986) , 1987
- Wimbledon: 1R (1982, 1983, 1985, 1986)
- US Open: 3R (1981)

Vicki Nelson-Dunbar (born September 25, 1962) is a former professional tennis player from the United States. During her career she won one top-level singles title (at São Paulo in 1986), and reached the fourth round of the US Open in 1982.

Nelson-Dunbar holds the record for participating in the longest women's tennis match against Jean Hepner which lasted six hours and 31 minutes. This match also featured the longest rally in tennis history, a 643-shot rally that lasted 29 minutes. The game occurred on September 24, 1984, at a tournament in Richmond, Virginia.

== WTA Tour finals ==
=== Singles (1 win, 1 loss) ===
Result	W-L	Date	Tournament	Surface	Opponent	Score
Loss	0–1	May 1985	Taranto, Italy	Clay	(Italy) Raffaella Reggi	3–6, 4–6
Win	1–1	Dec 1986	São Paulo, Brazil	Clay	(United States) Jenny Klitch	6–2, 7–6^{(7–1)}

== See also ==
- Longest tennis match records
