= Sandra Wasserman =

Belgian tennis player

- Country (sports): Belgium
- Born: 10 March 1970 (age 55); Antwerp, Belgium
- Height: 1.74 m (5 ft 8 1/2 in)
- Plays: Right-handed (two-handed backhand)
- Prize money: $287,310

Singles
- Career record: 133–138
- Career titles: 0
- Highest ranking: No. 48 (14 August 1989)

Grand Slam singles results
- Australian Open: 3R (1990)
- French Open: 3R (1987 1992)
- Wimbledon: 2R (1993)
- US Open: 3R (1988 1989)

Doubles
- Career record: 36–57
- Career titles: 1
- Highest ranking: No. 75 (30 January 1989)

Sandra Wasserman (born 10 March 1970) is a former professional tennis player from Antwerp, Belgium.

== Fed Cup ==
Wasserman became Belgium's youngest Fed Cup player when she lost to Csilla Bartos of Hungary in October 1985 in Japan. She also lost the longest tie-break played by the Belgian Fed Cup team, losing 13–11 to Jennifer Capriati of the United States in 1990 in Atlanta, Georgia after losing the first set 6–0.

== Results ==
Wasserman won her only doubles title at the Spanish Open in Barcelona, Spain on 25 April 1988, partnering Iva Budařová and beating Anna-Karin Olsson and María José Llorca in the final in three sets.

She reached the finals of the singles event at the Clarins Open in Paris, France during its first two years. In 1988, she lost to Sabrina Goleš, and in 1989, she was defeated by Petra Langrová.

Her five 3rd round defeats in Grand Slam tournaments were:

- Australian Open 1990 lost to Dianne Van Rensburg
- French Open 1987 lost to Manuela Maleeva and 1992 lost to Nathalie Tauziat after qualifying both times
- US Open 1988 lost to Katerina Maleeva and 1989 lost to Arantxa Sánchez Vicario

== WTA Tour finals ==
=== Singles (0–2) ===
Result	W/L	Date	Tournament	Surface	Opponent	Score
Loss	0–1	Oct 1987	Paris, France	Clay	(Socialist Federal Republic of Yugoslavia) Sabrina Goleš	5–7, 1–6
Loss	0–2	Sep 1988	Paris, France	Clay	(Czechoslovakia) Petra Langrová	6–7^{(0)}, 2–6

=== Doubles (1–0) ===
Result	W/L	Date	Tournament	Surface	Partner	Opponents	Score
Win	1–0	Apr 1988	Barcelona, Spain	Clay	(Czechoslovakia) Iva Budařová	(Sweden) Anna-Karin Olsson (Spain) María José Llorca	1–6, 6–3, 6–2

== ITF Circuit finals ==
$75,000 tournaments

=== Singles (0–2) ===
Outcome	No.	Date	Tournament	Surface	Opponent	Score
Runner-up	1.	7 February 1987	Rungsted, Denmark	Carpet	(Sweden) Lena Sandin	2–6, 0–6
Runner-up	2.	17 August 1992	Spoleto, Italy	Clay	(Germany) Maja Živec-Škulj	0–6, 6–7^{(6)}

== Grand Slam singles tournament timeline ==
Key
W	F	SF	QF	#R	RR	Q#	DNQ	A	NH

(W) winner; (F) finalist; (SF) semifinalist; (QF) quarterfinalist; (#R) rounds 4, 3, 2, 1; (RR) round-robin stage; (Q#) qualification round; (DNQ) did not qualify; (A) absent; (NH) not held; (SR) strike rate (events won / competed); (W–L) win–loss record.

Tournament	1987	1988	1989	1990	1991	1992	1993	1994	Career SR
Australian Open	A	2R	2R	3R	1R	A	2R	1R	0 / 6
French Open	3R	1R	2R	1R	A	3R	2R	A	0 / 6
Wimbledon	A	1R	A	1R	A	A	2R	A	0 / 3
U.S. Open	A	3R	2R	3R	A	A	1R	A	0 / 4
SR	0 / 1	0 / 4	0 / 3	0 / 4	0 / 1	0 / 1	0 / 4	0 / 1	0 / 19
