= Céline Cohen =

Swiss tennis player (born 1967)

- Full name: Céline Meinecke-Cohen
- Country (sports): Switzerland
- Born: 5 March 1967 (age 58)
- Prize money: $87,250

Singles
- Career record: 57–86
- Highest ranking: No. 114 (7 November 1988)

Grand Slam singles results
- Australian Open: 4R (1988)
- French Open: 3R (1990)

Doubles
- Career record: 24–42
- Highest ranking: No. 104 (17 July 1989)

Grand Slam doubles results
- Australian Open: 2R (1988, 1989)
- French Open: 1R (1987, 1988, 1989)

Céline Meinecke-Cohen (born 5 March 1967) is a former professional tennis player from Switzerland.

== Biography ==
=== Tennis career ===
Cohen, who grew up in Cartigny near Geneva, represented Switzerland in 11 Federation Cup ties, the first in 1986.

Her best performance in a grand slam tournament came at the 1988 Australian Open, where she made it to the round of 16. After beating Jill Hetherington to start her run, she won two close matches, over Catherine Suire 11–9 in the final set and then Lea Antonoplis 9–7 in the decider. She lost in the round of 16 to third seed Chris Evert.

She reached her career high singles ranking of 114 in the world in 1988. The following year she had a win over world number 17 Lori McNeil at the 1989 European Open held in Geneva. She retired from professional tennis after the 1991 season.

=== Personal life ===
Cohen is married to German tennis player Tore Meinecke and has three children. She is Jewish.

== ITF finals ==
=== Doubles (0–2) ===
Legend
$25,000 tournaments
$10,000 / $15,000 tournaments

Result	No.	Date	Tournament	Surface	Partner	Opponents	Score
Loss	1.	28 July 1986	Neumünster, West Germany	Clay	(Argentina) Susana Maria Villaverde	(Czechoslovakia) Denisa Krajčovičová (Czechoslovakia) Alice Noháčová	6–7, 3–6
Loss	2.	30 March 1987	Limoges, France	Clay	(Switzerland) Eva Krapl	(France) Isabelle Demongeot (France) Nathalie Tauziat	5–7, 2–6

== See also ==
- List of select Jewish tennis players
