= Mariana Pérez Roldán =

Argentine tennis player (born 1967)

Mariana Pérez
- Pérez in 1985
- Full name: Mariana Pérez Roldán
- Country (sports): Argentina
- Born: 7 November 1967 (age 57); Tandil, Argentina
- Prize money: US$ 67,753

Singles
- Career record: 79–48
- Highest ranking: No. 51 (18 July 1988)

Grand Slam singles results
- French Open: 2R (1987, 1988)
- US Open: 1R (1986, 1987)

Doubles
- Career record: 42–32
- Highest ranking: No. 128 (12 October 1987)

Grand Slam doubles results
- French Open: 1R (1987)

Grand Slam mixed doubles results
- French Open: QF (1986)

Mariana Pérez Roldán (born 7 November 1967) is an Argentine former professional tennis player.

She won the French Open girls' doubles championship and ITF World girls' doubles championship in 1985 with Patricia Tarabini.

During her career, she did not win any titles on the WTA Tour, but won four ITF titles, including three women's doubles.

== Junior Grand Slam finals ==
=== Girls' doubles (1–1) ===
Result	Year	Tournament	Surface	Partner	Opponents	Score
Win	1985	French Open	Clay	(Argentina) Patricia Tarabini	(Czechoslovakia) Andrea Holíková (Czechoslovakia) Radka Zrubáková	6–3, 5–7, 6–4
Loss	1985	US Open	Hard	(Argentina) Patricia Tarabini	(Czechoslovakia) Andrea Holíková (Czechoslovakia) Radka Zrubáková	4–6, 6–2, 5–7

== WTA career finals ==
=== Singles: 1 (runner-up) ===
Result	Date	Tournament	Surface	Opponent	Score
Loss	20 July 1986	Austrian Open	Clay	(Italy) Sandra Cecchini	4–6, 0–6

== ITF finals ==
$25,000 tournaments
$10,000 tournaments

=== Singles (1–3) ===
Result	No.	Date	Tournament	Surface	Opponent	Score
Loss	1.	1 April 1985	ITF Buenos Aires, Argentina	Clay	(Argentina) Mercedes Paz	3–6, 2–6
Loss	2.	15 July 1985	ITF Subiaco, Italy	Clay	(Italy) Barbara Romanò	6–7, 1–6
Loss	3.	22 July 1985	ITF Sezze, Italy	Clay	(Italy) Barbara Romanò	2–6, 4–6
Win	1.	9 June 1986	ITF Lyon, France	Clay	(Argentina) Bettina Fulco	6–4, 3–6, 6–1

=== Doubles (3–4) ===
Result	No.	Date	Tournament	Surface	Partner	Opponents	Score
Win	1.	17 March 1985	ITF Porto Alegre, Brazil	Clay	(Argentina) Patricia Tarabini	(United Kingdom) Rina Einy (United Kingdom) Lorrayne Gracie	7–6^{(0)}, 3–6, 6–4
Win	2.	1 April 1985	ITF Buenos Aires, Argentina	Clay	(Argentina) Patricia Tarabini	(Argentina) Gabriela Mosca (Argentina) Andrea Tiezzi	7–6, 6–4
Loss	1.	22 April 1985	ITF Monviso, Italy	Clay	(Argentina) Patricia Tarabini	(Italy) Patrizia Murgo (Italy) Barbara Romanò	6–7, 5–7
Win	3.	16 June 1985	ITF Amiens, France	Clay	(Argentina) Patricia Tarabini	(United States) Cammy MacGregor (United States) Cynthia MacGregor	6–3, 6–4
Loss	2.	15 July 1985	ITF Subiaco, Italy	Clay	(Argentina) Patricia Tarabini	(Italy) Patrizia Murgo (Italy) Barbara Romanò	2–6, 1–6
Loss	3.	22 July 1985	ITF Sezze, Italy	Clay	(Argentina) Patricia Tarabini	(Italy) Patrizia Murgo (Italy) Barbara Romanò	6–3, 3–6, 2–6
Loss	4.	3 April 1988	ITF Rome, Italy	Clay	(Argentina) Fernanda González	(Italy) Marzia Grossi (Italy) Francesca Romano	5–7, 3–6
