= Iva Budařová =

Czechoslovak tennis player

- Country (sports): Czechoslovakia
- Born: 31 July 1960 (age 66) Duchcov, Czechoslovakia
- Height: 1.71 m (5 ft 7 1/2 in)
- Retired: 1991
- Plays: Left-handed
- Prize money: $465,627

Singles
- Career record: 79–123
- Highest ranking: No. 24 (15 August 1983)

Grand Slam singles results
- Australian Open: 2R (1982, 1984)
- French Open: 3R (1979, 1983, 1984)
- Wimbledon: 3R (1983, 1984, 1986)
- US Open: 2R (1982, 1983, 1984, 1986)

Doubles
- Career record: 87–118
- Career titles: 4 WTA, 1 ITF
- Highest ranking: No. 55 (30 March 1987)

Grand Slam doubles results
- Australian Open: 1R (1982, 1983, 1984, 1989)
- French Open: 3R (1986)
- Wimbledon: 2R (1983, 1985, 1991)
- US Open: 2R (1982, 83, 84, 85, 86, 1988)

Team competitions
- Fed Cup: W (1983, 1984)
Medal record
Representing Czechoslovakia
Summer Universiade
Silver medal – second place	1987 Zagreb	Singles
Silver medal – second place	1987 Zagreb	Doubles

Iva Budařová (born 31 July 1960) is a former professional tennis player from Czechoslovakia.

Budařová played on the WTA Tour from 1978 until 1991, winning four doubles titles. She achieved a career high singles ranking of world No. 24 (in 1983) and a doubles ranking of No. 55 (in 1987). Budařová was a member of the Czechoslovakia Fed Cup team that won the Federation Cup 1983 and 1984.

== WTA Tour finals ==
=== Singles ===
Result	W/L	Date	Tournament	Surface	Opponent	Score
Loss	0–1	May 1984	Lugano, Switzerland	Clay	(Bulgaria) Manuela Maleeva	1–6, 1–6

=== Doubles (4–2) ===
Result	W/L	Date	Tournament	Surface	Partner	Opponents	Score
Loss	0–1	May 1984	Lugano, Switzerland	Clay	(Czechoslovakia) Marcela Skuherská	(Switzerland) Christiane Jolissaint (Netherlands) Marcella Mesker	4–6, 3–6
Win	1–1	May 1984	Perugia, Italy	Clay	(Czechoslovakia) Helena Suková	(United States) Kathleen Horvath (Romania) Virginia Ruzici	7–6^{(7–5)}, 1–6, 6–4
Win	2–1	May 1986	Barcelona, Spain	Clay	(France) Catherine Tanvier	(Austria) Petra Huber (West Germany) Petra Keppeler	6–2, 6–1
Loss	2–2	Nov 1986	Little Rock, US	Carpet (i)	(United States) Beth Herr	(Soviet Union) Svetlana Parkhomenko (Soviet Union) Larisa Savchenko	2–6, 6–1, 1–6
Win	3–2	Apr 1988	Barcelona, Spain	Clay	(Belgium) Sandra Wasserman	(Sweden) Anna-Karin Olsson (Spain) María José Llorca	1–6, 6–3, 6–2
Win	4–2	Jul 1989	Estoril, Portugal	Clay	(Czechoslovakia) Regina Kordová	(Argentina) Gaby Castro (Spain) Conchita Martínez	6–2, 6–4

== ITF finals ==
=== Singles (3–5) ===
Legend
$25,000 tournaments
$10,000 tournaments

Result	No.	Date	Tournament	Surface	Opponent	Score
Loss	1.	12 February 1979	Columbus, United States	Hard (i)	(United States) Renee Blount	6–7, 1–6
Loss	2.	14 October 1979	Barcelona, Spain	Clay	(Sweden) Lena Sandin	2-6, 3-6
Win	3.	29 November 1979	Uppsala, Sweden	Hard (i)	(Sweden) Nina Bohm	6–3, 6–4
Win	4.	5 December 1979	Helsingborg, Sweden	Hard (i)	(Sweden) Nina Bohm	6–2, 6–3
Win	5.	11 December 1979	Gothenburg, Sweden	Hard (i)	(France) Corinne Vanier	3–6, 6–3, 6–1
Loss	6.	17 December 1979	Lund, Sweden	Hard (i)	(Sweden) Nina Bohm	6–7, 3–6
Loss	7.	2 March 1981	Las Vegas, United States	Hard	(South Africa) Yvonne Vermaak	2–6, 3–6
Loss	8.	1 February 1982	Ogden, United States	Carpet	(Brazil) Pat Medrado	2–6, 6–7

=== Doubles (1–1) ===
Result	No.	Date	Tournament	Surface	Partner	Opponents	Score
Win	1.	1 February 1982	Ogden, United States	Carpet	(France) Catherine Tanvier	(Czechoslovakia) Yvona Brzáková (Czechoslovakia) Marcela Skuherská	6–3, 6–2
Loss	2.	27 July 1987	Neumünster, West Germany	Clay	(Czechoslovakia) Nora Bajčíková	(Czechoslovakia) Denisa Krajčovičová (Czechoslovakia) Radka Zrubáková	0–6, 2–6
