= Bettina Fulco =

Argentine tennis player (born 1968)

- Country (sports): Argentina
- Residence: Mar del Plata, Argentina
- Born: 23 October 1968 (age 57) Mar del Plata
- Height: 1.61 m (5 ft 3 1/2 in)
- Turned pro: 1987
- Retired: 1998
- Plays: Right-handed (one handed backhand)
- Prize money: $654,309

Singles
- Career record: 288–251
- Career titles: 2 ITF
- Highest ranking: No. 23 (10 October 1988)

Grand Slam singles results
- Australian Open: 2R (1995)
- French Open: QF (1988)
- Wimbledon: 3R (1987)
- US Open: 2R (1991)

Doubles
- Career record: 108–180
- Career titles: 3 WTA, 1 ITF
- Highest ranking: No. 62 (4 November 1991)

Grand Slam doubles results
- Australian Open: 2R (1992)
- French Open: 2R (1987, 1988, 1989)
- Wimbledon: 1R (1987, 1992, 1994)
- US Open: 2R (1990, 1992)

Mixed doubles
- Career record: 2–3
- Career titles: 0

Grand Slam mixed doubles results
- French Open: 2R (1989, 1990)

Bettina Mónica Fulco (born 23 October 1968) is a retired tennis player from Argentina. She reached her highest ranking of world, No. 23 on 10 October 1988.

She began playing tennis at age ten, at the university club in her hometown of Mar del Plata, having been inspired to start because of the increased interest in the sport in Argentina due to Guillermo Vilas' success. As a junior, Bettina was among the best in the world, reaching the finals of the Orange Bowl 18-and-under championships in 1986, and finishing second in the junior rankings in 1986. She turned professional in 1987. Like many South American players, Bettina Fulco was considered a clay-court specialist, and reached the quarterfinals of the French Open in 1988. Bettina beat Martina Navratilova in Houston 1994 for her biggest career victory. She also achieved victories over Conchita Martínez, Arantxa Sánchez Vicario, Hana Mandlíková, Katerina Maleeva, Manuela Maleeva, Magdalena Maleeva, Claudia Kohde-Kilsch, Lori McNeil and Nathalie Tauziat. She retired from professional tennis in 1998.

Since retiring from tennis, Bettina has been the director of the School of Tennis at the Club Atlético Kimberley, based in Mar del Plata. She is also a coach, having worked with notable players such as Victoria Azarenka, Kateryna Bondarenko, Angelique Widjaja and Emma Laine. In addition, Bettina was the captain of the Argentina Fed Cup team from 2011 to 2013.

== WTA career finals ==
Tournament (W–R)	Singles	Doubles
Grand Slam tournaments	0–0	0–0
Tier I	0–0	0–0
Tier II	0–0	0–0
Tier III	0–0	0–0
Tier IV	0–0	1–0
Tier V	0–1	1–0
VS	0–1	1–0

=== Singles: 2 (2 runner-ups) ===
Result	W/L	Date	Tournament	Tier	Surface	Opponent	Score
Loss	0–1	Oct 1986	Japan Open, Tokyo	VS	Hard	(Canada) Helen Kelesi	6–2, 6–2
Loss	0–2	Apr 1988	Spanish Open, Barcelona	Tier V	Clay	(Brazil) Neige Dias	6–3, 6–3

=== Doubles: 3 (3 titles) ===
Result	W/L	Date	Tournament	Tier	Surface	Partner	Opponents	Score
Win	1–0	Nov 1988	Brasil Open, Guarujá	VS	Hard	(Argentina) Mercedes Paz	(Netherlands) Carin Bakkum (Netherlands) Simone Schilder	6–3, 6–4
Win	2–0	Nov 1990	Brasil Open, São Paulo	Tier V	Clay	(Czechoslovakia) Eva Švíglerová	(France) Mary Pierce (United States) Luanne Spadea	7–5, 6–4
Win	3–0	Jul 1991	Austrian Open, Kitzbühel	Tier IV	Clay	(Netherlands) Nicole Muns	(Italy) Sandra Cecchini (Argentina) Patricia Tarabini	7–5, 6–4

== ITF Circuit finals ==
$50,000 tournaments
$25,000 tournaments
$10,000 tournaments

=== Singles: 6 (2–4) ===
Result	No.	Date	Tournament	Surface	Opponent	Score
Loss	1.	9 June 1986	ITF Lyon, France	Clay	(Argentina) Mariana Pérez Roldán	4–6, 6–3, 1–6
Win	2.	21 July 1986	ITF Philadelphia, United States	Hard	(Australia) Susan Leo	3–6, 6–2, 6–0
Win	3.	20 September 1993	ITF Capua, Italy	Clay	(Croatia) Maja Palaveršić	2–6, 6–4, 6–4
Loss	4.	11 July 1994	ITF Darmstadt, Germany	Clay	(Moldova) Svetlana Komleva	4–6, 1–6
Loss	5.	29 September 1997	ITF Buenos Aires, Argentina	Clay	(Argentina) María Fernanda Landa	4–6, 1–6
Loss	6.	3 August 1998	ITF Catania, Italy	Clay	(Argentina) Romina Ottoboni	4–6, 6–7^{(2–7)}

=== Doubles: 3 (1–2) ===
Result	No.	Date	Tournament	Surface	Partner	Opponents	Score
Win	1.	7 April 1986	ITF Caserta, Italy	Clay	(Brazil) Gisele Miró	(West Germany) Wiltrud Probst (Netherlands) Marianne van der Torre	6–3, 6–3
Loss	2.	11 July 1994	ITF Darmstadt, Germany	Clay	(Argentina) Patricia Tarabini	(South Korea) Park Sung-hee (South Korea) Choi Ju-yeon	4–6, 3–6
Loss	3.	9 August 1998	ITF Catania, Italy	Clay	(Argentina) Jorgelina Torti	(Italy) Chiara Dalbon (Italy) Alberta Brianti	5–7, 4–6

== Grand Slam singles performance timeline ==
Key
W	F	SF	QF	#R	RR	Q#	DNQ	A	NH

(W) winner; (F) finalist; (SF) semifinalist; (QF) quarterfinalist; (#R) rounds 4, 3, 2, 1; (RR) round-robin stage; (Q#) qualification round; (DNQ) did not qualify; (A) absent; (NH) not held; (SR) strike rate (events won / competed); (W–L) win–loss record.

=== Singles ===
Tournament	1987	1988	1989	1990	1991	1992	1993	1994	1995	1996	1997	Career W-L
Australian Open	A	A	A	A	A	1R	1R	A	2R	A	1R	1–4
French Open	2R	QF	2R	1R	3R	1R	1R	1R	Q1	A	Q2	8–8
Wimbledon	3R	A	A	A	2R	1R	A	1R	A	A	Q1	3–4
US Open	1R	1R	1R	1R	2R	1R	A	1R	A	Q2	Q1	1–7
