= Niege Dias =

Brazilian tennis player

- Full name: Niege Pelanio Dias
- Country (sports): Brazil
- Born: 5 December 1966 (age 59) Santa Cruz do Sul, Brazil
- Height: 1.65 m (5 ft 5 in)
- Retired: 1989
- Plays: Right-handed (two-handed backhand)
- Prize money: US$ 175,944

Singles
- Career record: 112–83
- Career titles: 2 WTA
- Highest ranking: No. 31 (5 December 1988)

Grand Slam singles results
- French Open: 3R (1989)
- Wimbledon: 2R (1986)
- US Open: 2R (1987)

Doubles
- Career record: 47–69
- Career titles: 1 WTA
- Highest ranking: No. 89 (31 August 1987)

Niege Dias (Note: Her name is spelled Neige Dias by the ITF; WTA spells it 'Niege'.) (born 5 December 1966) is a former professional tennis player from Brazil. She also competed for the Brazil Fed Cup team from 1985 to 1988.

In her career, she won two WTA Tour singles tournaments, the 1987 Brazil Open and 1988 Barcelona Open.

Partnering with fellow Brazilian Patricia Medrado, Dias won her first and only WTA tour doubles title at São Paulo in 1986.

Her best singles result at a Grand Slam tournament was reaching the third round of the 1988 French Open.

Dias retired from professional tennis in 1989, at the age of 22. She married her former coach, Luiz Carlos Enck.

== WTA Career finals ==
=== Singles: 2 (2 titles) ===
Result	W/L	Date	Tournament	Surface	Opponent	Score
Win	1–0	Dec 1987	Guarujá, Brazil	Clay	(Brazil) Patricia Medrado	6–0, 6–7, 6–4
Win	2–0	Apr 1988	Barcelona, Spain	Clay	(Argentina) Bettina Fulco	6–3, 6–3

=== Doubles: 2 (1 title, 1 runner-up) ===
Result	W/L	Date	Tournament	Surface	Partner	Opponents	Score
Loss	0–1	Dec 1985	São Paulo, Brazil	Clay	(Hungary) Csilla Bartos	(Argentina) Mercedes Paz (Argentina) Gabriela Sabatini	5–7, 4–6
Win	1–1	Dec 1986	São Paulo, Brazil	Clay	(Brazil) Patricia Medrado	(Austria) Petra Huber (Peru) Laura Gildemeister	4–6, 6–4, 7–6^{(8–6)}
