= Patricia Medrado =

Brazilian tennis player

- Country (sports): Brazil
- Born: 26 November 1956 (age 69) Salvador Brazil
- Prize money: $327,734

Singles
- Career record: 63–71
- Career titles: 0
- Highest ranking: No. 48 (31 January 1983)

Grand Slam singles results
- French Open: 3R (1978, 1979)
- Wimbledon: 3R (1982)
- US Open: 2R (1976, 1982)

Doubles
- Career record: 45–61
- Career titles: 3
- Highest ranking: No. 68 (2 March 1987)

Grand Slam doubles results
- French Open: 3R (1988)
- Wimbledon: QF (1982)
- US Open: 3R (1983)

Team competitions
- Fed Cup: 30–29
Medal record
Women's tennis
Pan American Games
Silver medal – second place	1975 Mexico City	Women's singles

Patricia "Pat" Medrado (born 26 November 1956) is a former professional tennis player from Brazil. She competed in the Fed Cup from 1975 to 1989, and won the silver medal at the 1975 Pan-American Games in Mexico.

Born in Salvador, Bahia, Patrícia had her first contact with the sport when she was ten years old, enrolled in the school of the Bahia Athletic Association. She earned two college degrees before becoming a professional tennis player, graduating in Physical Education and Physical Therapy.

Among her main achievements, she reached the 48th position in the world ranking of singles and won the silver medal of the Pan-American Games of 1975 in Mexico City. In doubles, she reached ninth place in the ranking, playing alongside São Paulo player Cláudia Monteiro. They reached the Wimbledon quarterfinals in 1982, defeating Billie Jean King and Ilana Kloss in the second round.

For eleven consecutive years (1974 to 1985), she was ranked No. 1 player in Brazil, and until now is the player with the largest number of entries and victories by Brazil in the Fed Cup, representing the country for 14 years.

After 15 years in the professional circuit, she finished her career in 1989, playing in the Miami tournament.

In her later career, she has managed a gym for nine years and trained athletes of the Brazilian women's team, including Andrea Vieira, Luciana Tella, Claudia Chabalgoity, Vanessa Menga, Stephanie Mayorkis, Eugenia Maia and Roberta Burzagli. She became the first women tennis commentator on national television and wrote several columns for specialized magazines.

In 1996, she brought the "Tennis in Schools" Program to Brazil, created by the International Tennis Federation with the purpose of making sports accessible to all social strata.

One of her more notable events came in 2016 when she was invited by the Ministry of Sport to carry the Olympic torch of the Rio 2016 Games in Salvador.

== Career summary ==
International

1972 – runner-up and doubles champion – South American Junior Championship (Belo Horizonte)
1972 – Team champion – Banana Bowl Tournament (Santos, SP)
1973 – singles champion – Banana Bowl Tournament (Santos, SP)
1973 to 1987 – Player of the Brazilian team in the Fed Cup
1974 – singles champion – Banana Bowl Tournament "(Santos, SP)
1974 – doubles champion – Orange Bowl Tournament (USA)
1974 – singles champion – Liverpool Open Championship (England)
1974 – singles champion – Scottish National Championship (Scotland)
1975 – silver medal – Pan American Games (Mexico)
1975 – singles champion – Fort Myers Tournament (USA)
1976 – singles champion – Immortal Gerona (Spain)
1976 – singles champion – Open From Valencia (Spain)
1977 – singles champion – Argentina Open
1977 – singles champion – Danish Tournament (Denmark)
1977 – vice-champion by team – South American Championship (Argentina)
1977/1978/1980/1982/1983 – Champion of the Copa Santista
1978 – vice-champion Avon Futures Circuit (San Diego, California)
1979 – runner-Up Avon Futures (Atlanta, USA)
1981 – champion of the Sylphide Circuit (France)
1982 – champion – Avon Futures Ogden (USA)
1982 – 48th position in the world ranking
1982 – 9th position in the world ranking of doubles
1985 – champion – Renaissance Cup (Japan)
1996/1997 – Champion International – VIP Tournament (Porto Alegre)
1997/1998 – Champion International – VIP Tournament (São Paulo)
1997 – Champion International – VIP Tournament (Punta del Este, Uruguay)
2000 – South American champion by teams, ladies 40 (Santiago, Chile)
2000 – 4th place world 40 years team (Mar del Plata, Argentina)
2000 – 3rd place worldwide 40 years double (Buenos Aires, Argentina)
2000 – Champion – Tournament Viii Itfvets ranking championships (São Paulo, Brazil)
2001 – South American champion by teams, ladies 40 (Santos, Brazil)
2001 – Masters World Champion, single and double 45 (Velden, Austria)
2002 – Vice-Champion Masters 45 by team (Palm Beach, USA)
2002 – World Vice-champion individual master 45 (Fort Lauderdale, USA)
2002 – Champion – X-Itf Vets World Ranking Championship 45 (Santos – SP)
2002 – Champion International – Vip Tournament, women's 40 singles and doubles (Rio Grande do Sul, Brazil)
2003 – Master World Champion, singles 45 (Hanover, Germany)
2004 – runner-up world champion, singles 45 (Antalya, Turkey)
2004 – champion – International Tennis Club Tournament, ladies 40 years (Paris, France)
2006 – champion singles and doubles – Iv Itf Seniors Hotel do Frade (Rio de Janeiro, Brazil)
2006 – world champion – Master, singles 50 (Durban, South Africa)
2009 – world champion, singles 50 (Mallorca, Spain)
2016 – world champion – Master, singles and doubles 60 (Helsinki, Finland)
2017 – world champion – Master, doubles and mixed-doubles 60 (Miami, United States)

National

1970 – Brazilian champion children and youth
1974 – Brazilian Champion adults
1974 to 1985 – # 1 player from Brazil
1988 – Brazilian champion of covered and uncovered courts
1999 – Champion interclubes 1 class above 35 years, team – São Paulo
2000 – Champion interclub women 40 years, team – São Paulo
2000 – Vice-champion interclub women 35 years team – São Paulo
2001 – Brazilian champion ladies 35 years – Ribeirão Preto, SP
2001 – Champion 1st class Tournament Hotel Capitania – Porto Seguro
2002 – Champion interclub ladies 35 and 45 years old – São Paulo
2002 – Brazilian champion vets 45 – Angra dos Reis, Rio de Janeiro
2003 – Champion interclub women 40 years, team – São Paulo
2004 – Champion interclub women 40 years, team – São Paulo
2004 – Champion interclubes 1 class above 35 years, team – São Paulo
2005 – Champion interclub women 45 years, team – São Paulo
2006 – Champion interclub ladies 45 and 50 years, team – São Paulo

«FedCup profile». Retrieved 22 August 2015

== Career finals ==
=== Singles: 2 (2 runner-ups) ===
Result	W/L	Date	Tournament	Surface	Opponent	Score
Silver	0–1	Oct 1975	Pan American Games, Mexico City	Clay	(United States) Lele Forood	1–6, 0–6
Loss	0–2	Dec 1987	WTA Brasil Open, Guarujá	Clay	(Brazil) Neige Dias	0–6, 7–6, 4–6
