= 1985 Virginia Slims World Championship Series =

Women's tennis circuit

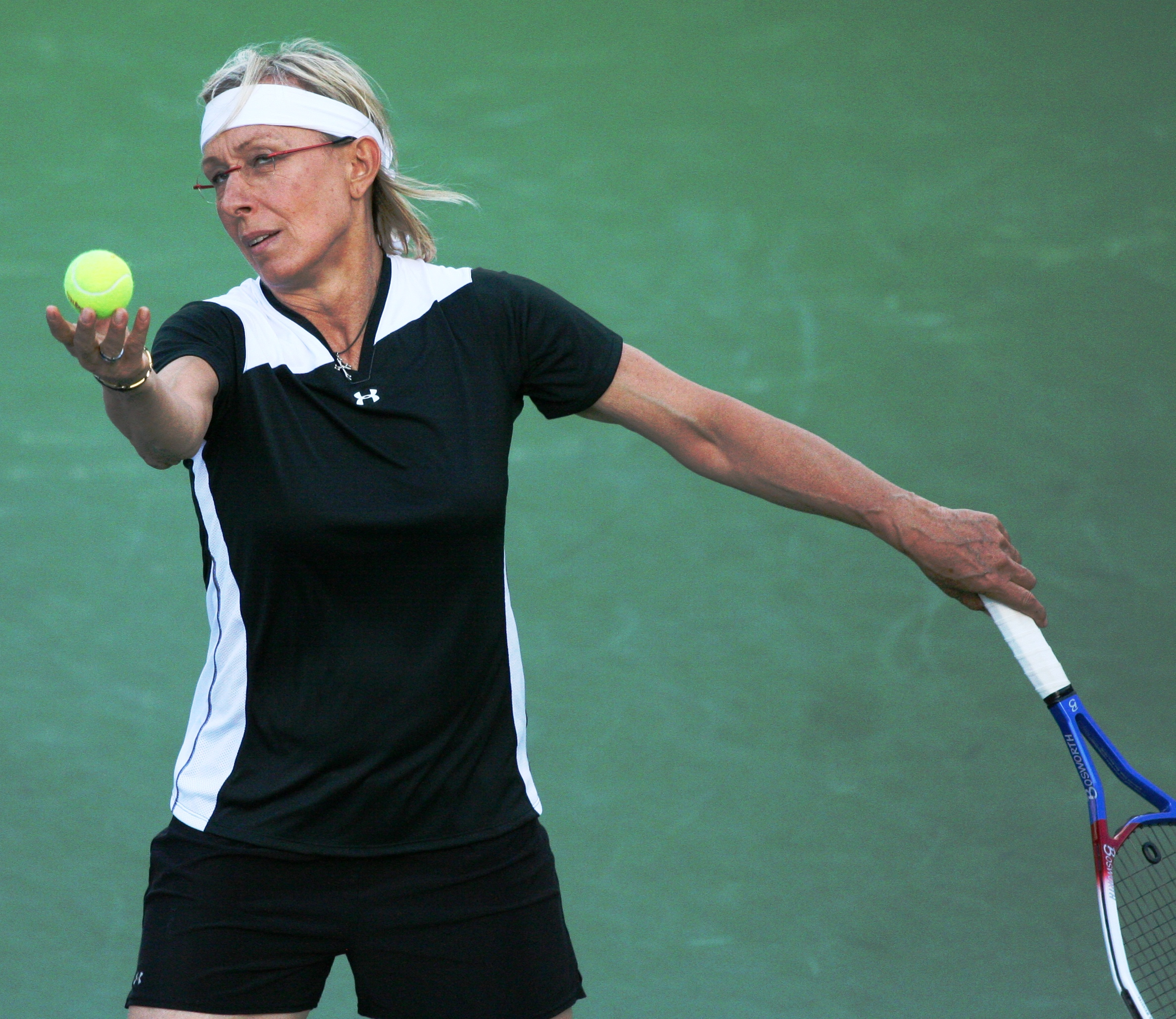
- Martina Navratilova finished the year as world No. 1 for the record-breaking sixth time in her career. She won 13 singles tournaments during the season, including two majors at the Wimbledon Championships and the Australian Open, as well as the Virginia Slims Championships. She also finished runner-up at the other two majors, the French Open and the US Open.

Details
- Duration: March 25, 1985 – March 23, 1986
- Edition: 13th
- Tournaments: 53
- Categories: Grand Slam (4); WTA Championships; Tour Events (48)

Achievements (singles)
- Most titles: (United States) Martina Navratilova (13)
- Most finals: (United States) Martina Navratilova (15)
- Prize money leader: (United States) Martina Navratilova $1,328,829
- Points leader: (United States) Martina Navratilova 191.32

Awards
- Player of the year: (United States) Martina Navratilova
- Doubles team of the year: (United States) Martina Navratilova (United States) Pam Shriver
- Most improved player of the year: (Czechoslovakia) Helena Suková
- Newcomer of the year: (Argentina) Gabriela Sabatini

The 1985 Virginia Slims World Championship Series was the 13th season since the foundation of the Women's Tennis Association. It commenced in March 1985, and concluded in March 1986 after 52 events.

The Virginia Slims World Championship Series was the elite tour for professional women's tennis organised by the Women's Tennis Association (WTA). It was held in place of the WTA Tour from 1983 until 1987 and featured tournaments that had previously been part of the Toyota Series and the Avon Series. It included the four Grand Slam tournaments and a series of other events. ITF tournaments were not part of the tour, although they awarded points for the WTA World Ranking.

The season was dominated by Martina Navratilova, who won 13 tournaments and reached the finals of the four Grand Slam events. She defeated Chris Evert at Wimbledon and the Australian Open. Navratilova also won the Virginia Slims Championships in March and ended the year at world Number 1. Evert, the winner of ten titles in 1985, emerged victorious at Roland-Garros, while Hana Mandlíková won the U.S. Open. Newcomer of the Year Gabriela Sabatini won the first title of her career in Tokyo. In doubles, the pairing of Navratilova and Pam Shriver won the title at Roland-Garros and the Australian Open, Jordan and Smylie won the Wimbledon title and Kohde-Kilsch–Suková were victorious at the US Open.

== Schedule ==
The table below shows the 1985 Virginia Slims World Championship Series schedule.

=== March ===
Week	Tournament	Champions	Runners-up	Semifinalists	Quarterfinalists
25 Mar	WTA of PGA; Palm Beach Gardens, United States; Clay – $50,000 – 32S/16D	(United States) Kathleen Horvath; 3–6, 6–3, 6–3	(Switzerland) Petra Delhees	(Italy) Raffaella Reggi (United States) Terry Phelps	(Denmark) Tine Scheuer-Larsen (Argentina) Gabriela Sabatini (United States) Beth Herr (United States) Shawn Foltz
25 Mar	WTA of PGA; Palm Beach Gardens, United States; Clay – $50,000 – 32S/16D	(United States) Anne Smith (United States) JoAnne Russell; 1–6, 6–1, 7–6	(Peru) Laura Gildemeister (Argentina) Gabriela Sabatini	(Italy) Raffaella Reggi (United States) Terry Phelps	(Denmark) Tine Scheuer-Larsen (Argentina) Gabriela Sabatini (United States) Beth Herr (United States) Shawn Foltz

=== April ===
Week	Tournament	Champions	Runners-up	Semifinalists	Quarterfinalists
1 Apr	Wild Dunes; Seabrook Island, United States; Clay – $75,000 – 32S/16D/32Q	(Bulgaria) Katerina Maleeva; 6–3, 6–3	(Romania) Virginia Ruzici	(Socialist Federal Republic of Yugoslavia) Sabrina Goleš (Denmark) Tine Scheuer-Larsen	(United States) Shawn Foltz (United States) Susan Mascarin (United States) Debbie Spence (Brazil) Neige Dias
1 Apr	Wild Dunes; Seabrook Island, United States; Clay – $75,000 – 32S/16D/32Q	(Soviet Union) Svetlana Cherneva (Soviet Union) Larisa Savchenko; 6–1, 6–3	(United States) Elise Burgin (United States) Lori McNeil	(Socialist Federal Republic of Yugoslavia) Sabrina Goleš (Denmark) Tine Scheuer-Larsen	(United States) Shawn Foltz (United States) Susan Mascarin (United States) Debbie Spence (Brazil) Neige Dias
1 Apr	Bridgestone Doubles Championships; Tokyo, Japan; Carpet (i) – $175,000 – 9D	(United States) Kathy Jordan (Australia) Elizabeth Smylie; 4–6, 7–5, 6–2	(United States) Betsy Nagelsen (United States) Anne White	(United States) Kiyomura / (United States) Reynolds (Australia) Turnbull / (United States) Walsh	(United States) Moulton / (United States) Smith (Switzerland) Jolissaint / (Netherlands) Mesker (United States) Piatek / (United States) White (West Germany) Bunge / (United States) Jaeger
8 Apr	Family Circle Cup; Hilton Head Island, United States; Clay – $200,000 – 56S/32D/32Q	(United States) Chris Evert-Lloyd; 6–4, 6–0	(Argentina) Gabriela Sabatini	(West Germany) Steffi Graf (Bulgaria) Manuela Maleeva	(Romania) Virginia Ruzici (Austria) Petra Huber (United States) Pam Shriver (United States) Barbara Potter
8 Apr	Family Circle Cup; Hilton Head Island, United States; Clay – $200,000 – 56S/32D/32Q	(South Africa) Rosalyn Fairbank (United States) Pam Shriver; 6–4, 6–1	(Soviet Union) Svetlana Cherneva (Soviet Union) Larisa Savchenko	(West Germany) Steffi Graf (Bulgaria) Manuela Maleeva	(Romania) Virginia Ruzici (Austria) Petra Huber (United States) Pam Shriver (United States) Barbara Potter
15 Apr	Sunkist WTA Championships; Amelia Island, United States; Clay – $250,000 – 56S/32D/32Q	(United States) Zina Garrison; 6–4, 6–3	(United States) Chris Evert-Lloyd	(West Germany) Claudia Kohde-Kilsch (Czechoslovakia) Hana Mandlíková	(Argentina) Gabriela Sabatini (United States) Kathleen Horvath (West Germany) Steffi Graf (Romania) Virginia Ruzici
15 Apr	Sunkist WTA Championships; Amelia Island, United States; Clay – $250,000 – 56S/32D/32Q	(South Africa) Rosalyn Fairbank (Czechoslovakia) Hana Mandlíková; 6–1, 2–6, 6–2	(Canada) Carling Bassett (United States) Chris Evert-Lloyd	(West Germany) Claudia Kohde-Kilsch (Czechoslovakia) Hana Mandlíková	(Argentina) Gabriela Sabatini (United States) Kathleen Horvath (West Germany) Steffi Graf (Romania) Virginia Ruzici
22 Apr	Chrysler Tournament of Champions; Orlando, United States; Clay – $200,000 – 24S/5D; Singles – Doubles	(United States) Martina Navratilova; 6–1, 6–0	(Bulgaria) Katerina Maleeva	(West Germany) Claudia Kohde-Kilsch (United States) Bonnie Gadusek	(United States) Debbie Spence (Sweden) Catarina Lindqvist (Italy) Sandra Cecchini (Bulgaria) Manuela Maleeva
22 Apr	Chrysler Tournament of Champions; Orlando, United States; Clay – $200,000 – 24S/5D; Singles – Doubles	(United States) Martina Navratilova (United States) Pam Shriver; 6–3, 6–1	(United States) Elise Burgin (United States) Kathleen Horvath	(West Germany) Claudia Kohde-Kilsch (United States) Bonnie Gadusek	(United States) Debbie Spence (Sweden) Catarina Lindqvist (Italy) Sandra Cecchini (Bulgaria) Manuela Maleeva
22 Apr	Virginia Slims of San Diego; San Diego, United States; Hard – $75,000 – 32S/16D/32Q	(United Kingdom) Annabel Croft; 6–0, 7–6	(Australia) Wendy Turnbull	(United States) Mary Lou Piatek (United States) Melissa Gurney	(United States) Betsy Nagelsen (United States) Hu Na (United States) Beth Herr (South Africa) Rosalyn Fairbank
22 Apr	Virginia Slims of San Diego; San Diego, United States; Hard – $75,000 – 32S/16D/32Q	(United States) Candy Reynolds (Australia) Wendy Turnbull; 6–4, 6–0	(South Africa) Rosalyn Fairbank (Australia) Susan Leo	(United States) Mary Lou Piatek (United States) Melissa Gurney	(United States) Betsy Nagelsen (United States) Hu Na (United States) Beth Herr (South Africa) Rosalyn Fairbank
29 Apr	Virginia Slims of Houston; Houston, United States; Clay – $150,000 – 28S/16D/32Q	(United States) Martina Navratilova; 6–4, 6–1	(United States) Elise Burgin	(Czechoslovakia) Helena Suková (Bulgaria) Manuela Maleeva	(Czechoslovakia) Regina Maršíková (United States) Mary Lou Piatek (United States) Zina Garrison (Socialist Federal Republic of Yugoslavia) Sabrina Goleš
29 Apr	Virginia Slims of Houston; Houston, United States; Clay – $150,000 – 28S/16D/32Q	(United States) Elise Burgin (United States) Martina Navratilova; 6–1, 3–6, 6–3	(Bulgaria) Manuela Maleeva (Czechoslovakia) Helena Suková	(Czechoslovakia) Helena Suková (Bulgaria) Manuela Maleeva	(Czechoslovakia) Regina Maršíková (United States) Mary Lou Piatek (United States) Zina Garrison (Socialist Federal Republic of Yugoslavia) Sabrina Goleš
29 Apr	Italian Open; Taranto, Italy; Clay – $50,000 – 28S/16D/32Q; Singles – Doubles	(Italy) Raffaella Reggi; 6–3, 6–4	(United States) Vicki Nelson-Dunbar	(Italy) Laura Garrone (Italy) Caterina Nozzoli	(West Germany) Myriam Schropp (West Germany) Isabel Cueto (Czechoslovakia) Iva Budařová (Czechoslovakia) Kateřina Böhmová
29 Apr	Italian Open; Taranto, Italy; Clay – $50,000 – 28S/16D/32Q; Singles – Doubles	(Italy) Sandra Cecchini (Italy) Raffaella Reggi; 1–6, 6–4, 6–3	(Italy) Patrizia Murgo (Italy) Barbara Romanò	(Italy) Laura Garrone (Italy) Caterina Nozzoli	(West Germany) Myriam Schropp (West Germany) Isabel Cueto (Czechoslovakia) Iva Budařová (Czechoslovakia) Kateřina Böhmová

=== May ===
Week	Tournament	Champions	Runners-up	Semifinalists	Quarterfinalists
6 May	Barcelona Open; Barcelona, Spain; Clay – $50,000 – 32S/16D	(Italy) Sandra Cecchini; 6–3, 6–4	(Italy) Raffaella Reggi	(Czechoslovakia) Andrea Holíková (Czechoslovakia) Regina Maršíková	(Romania) Virginia Ruzici (United States) Ginny Purdy (Czechoslovakia) Kateřina Skronská (Czechoslovakia) Lea Plchová
6 May	Barcelona Open; Barcelona, Spain; Clay – $50,000 – 32S/16D	(Switzerland) Petra Jauch-Delhees (Brazil) Pat Medrado; 6–1, 6–0	(United States) Penny Barg (Argentina) Adriana Villagrán	(Czechoslovakia) Andrea Holíková (Czechoslovakia) Regina Maršíková	(Romania) Virginia Ruzici (United States) Ginny Purdy (Czechoslovakia) Kateřina Skronská (Czechoslovakia) Lea Plchová
6 May	Australian Indoors; Sydney, Australia; Hard (i) – $200,000 – 32S/16D	(United States) Pam Shriver; 6–3, 6–3	(Australia) Dianne Balestrat	(United States) Alycia Moulton (United States) Gigi Fernández	(South Africa) Rosalyn Nideffer (United Kingdom) Annabel Croft (United States) Barbara Potter (United States) Kathy Jordan
6 May	Australian Indoors; Sydney, Australia; Hard (i) – $200,000 – 32S/16D	(United States) Pam Shriver (Australia) Elizabeth Smylie; 7–5, 7–5	(United States) Barbara Potter (United States) Sharon Walsh	(United States) Alycia Moulton (United States) Gigi Fernández	(South Africa) Rosalyn Nideffer (United Kingdom) Annabel Croft (United States) Barbara Potter (United States) Kathy Jordan
13 May	Fila German Open; West Berlin, West Germany; Clay – $150,000 – 56S/32D	(United States) Chris Evert-Lloyd; 6–4, 7–5	(West Germany) Steffi Graf	(United States) Kathy Rinaldi (West Germany) Bettina Bunge	(United States) Lisa Bonder (Sweden) Catarina Lindqvist (United States) Kathleen Horvath (West Germany) Claudia Kohde-Kilsch
13 May	Fila German Open; West Berlin, West Germany; Clay – $150,000 – 56S/32D	(West Germany) Claudia Kohde-Kilsch (Czechoslovakia) Helena Suková; 6–4, 6–1	(West Germany) Steffi Graf (France) Catherine Tanvier	(United States) Kathy Rinaldi (West Germany) Bettina Bunge	(United States) Lisa Bonder (Sweden) Catarina Lindqvist (United States) Kathleen Horvath (West Germany) Claudia Kohde-Kilsch
13 May	Melbourne Indoors; Melbourne, Australia; Hard (i) – $75,000 – 32S/16D; Singles	(United States) Pam Shriver; 6–4, 6–4	(United States) Kathy Jordan	(United Kingdom) Annabel Croft (United States) Barbara Potter	(United States) Ann Henricksson (United Kingdom) Amanda Brown (South Africa) Rosalyn Nideffer (United States) Sharon Walsh
13 May	Melbourne Indoors; Melbourne, Australia; Hard (i) – $75,000 – 32S/16D; Singles	(United States) Pam Shriver (Australia) Elizabeth Smylie; 6–2, 5–7, 6–1	(United Kingdom) Anne Hobbs (United States) Kathy Jordan	(United Kingdom) Annabel Croft (United States) Barbara Potter	(United States) Ann Henricksson (United Kingdom) Amanda Brown (South Africa) Rosalyn Nideffer (United States) Sharon Walsh
20 May	Swiss Open; Lugano, Switzerland; Clay – $100,000 – 56S/28D	(United States) Bonnie Gadusek; 6–2, 6–2	(Bulgaria) Manuela Maleeva	(West Germany) Sylvia Hanika (Czechoslovakia) Helena Suková	(Argentina) Gabriela Sabatini (United States) Kathy Rinaldi (Bulgaria) Katerina Maleeva (United States) Kathleen Horvath
20 May	Swiss Open; Lugano, Switzerland; Clay – $100,000 – 56S/28D	(United States) Bonnie Gadusek (Czechoslovakia) Helena Suková; 6–2, 6–4	(West Germany) Bettina Bunge (West Germany) Eva Pfaff	(West Germany) Sylvia Hanika (Czechoslovakia) Helena Suková	(Argentina) Gabriela Sabatini (United States) Kathy Rinaldi (Bulgaria) Katerina Maleeva (United States) Kathleen Horvath
27 May	French Open; Paris, France; Grand Slam; Clay – $975,000 – 128S/64Q/64D/48X; Singles – Doubles – Mixed doubles	(United States) Chris Evert-Lloyd; 6–3, 6–7^{(4–7)}, 7–5	(United States) Martina Navratilova	(West Germany) Claudia Kohde-Kilsch (Argentina) Gabriela Sabatini	(Italy) Sandra Cecchini (Czechoslovakia) Hana Mandlíková (Bulgaria) Manuela Maleeva (United States) Terry Phelps
27 May	French Open; Paris, France; Grand Slam; Clay – $975,000 – 128S/64Q/64D/48X; Singles – Doubles – Mixed doubles	(United States) Martina Navratilova (United States) Pam Shriver; 4–6, 6–2, 6–2	(West Germany) Claudia Kohde-Kilsch (Czechoslovakia) Helena Suková	(West Germany) Claudia Kohde-Kilsch (Argentina) Gabriela Sabatini	(Italy) Sandra Cecchini (Czechoslovakia) Hana Mandlíková (Bulgaria) Manuela Maleeva (United States) Terry Phelps
27 May	French Open; Paris, France; Grand Slam; Clay – $975,000 – 128S/64Q/64D/48X; Singles – Doubles – Mixed doubles	(United States) Martina Navratilova (Switzerland) Heinz Günthardt; 2–6, 6–3, 6–2	(United States) Paula Smith (Paraguay) Francisco González	(West Germany) Claudia Kohde-Kilsch (Argentina) Gabriela Sabatini	(Italy) Sandra Cecchini (Czechoslovakia) Hana Mandlíková (Bulgaria) Manuela Maleeva (United States) Terry Phelps

=== June ===
Week	Tournament	Champions	Runners-up	Semifinalists	Quarterfinalists
10 Jun	Edgbaston Cup; Birmingham, Great Britain; Grass – $125,000 – 56S/32D/32Q; Singles	(United States) Pam Shriver; 6–1, 6–0	(United States) Betsy Nagelsen	(United States) Elise Burgin (United States) Susan Mascarin	(United Kingdom) Anne Hobbs (United States) Robin White (United States) Alycia Moulton (United States) Ann Henricksson
10 Jun	Edgbaston Cup; Birmingham, Great Britain; Grass – $125,000 – 56S/32D/32Q; Singles	(United States) Terry Holladay (United States) Sharon Walsh, 6–2, 6–4	(United States) Elise Burgin (United States) Alycia Moulton	(United States) Elise Burgin (United States) Susan Mascarin	(United Kingdom) Anne Hobbs (United States) Robin White (United States) Alycia Moulton (United States) Ann Henricksson
17 Jun	Pilkington Glass Championships; Eastbourne, Great Britain; Grass – $175,000 – 64S/32D/32Q	(United States) Martina Navratilova; 6–4, 6–3	(Czechoslovakia) Helena Suková	(Bulgaria) Manuela Maleeva (Australia) Wendy Turnbull	(West Germany) Bettina Bunge (United States) Kathy Rinaldi (United States) Barbara Potter (France) Pascale Paradis
17 Jun	Pilkington Glass Championships; Eastbourne, Great Britain; Grass – $175,000 – 64S/32D/32Q	(United States) Martina Navratilova (United States) Pam Shriver; 7–5, 6–4	(United States) Kathy Jordan (Australia) Elizabeth Smylie	(Bulgaria) Manuela Maleeva (Australia) Wendy Turnbull	(West Germany) Bettina Bunge (United States) Kathy Rinaldi (United States) Barbara Potter (France) Pascale Paradis
24 Jun	Wimbledon Championships; London, Great Britain; Grand Slam; Grass – $900,000 – 128S/64Q/64D/64X; Singles – Doubles – Mixed doubles	(United States) Martina Navratilova; 4–6, 6–3, 6–2	(United States) Chris Evert-Lloyd	(United States) Kathy Rinaldi (United States) Zina Garrison	(United States) Barbara Potter (Czechoslovakia) Helena Suková (United States) Molly Van Nostrand (United States) Pam Shriver
24 Jun	Wimbledon Championships; London, Great Britain; Grand Slam; Grass – $900,000 – 128S/64Q/64D/64X; Singles – Doubles – Mixed doubles	(United States) Kathy Jordan (Australia) Elizabeth Smylie; 5–7, 6–3, 6–4	(United States) Martina Navratilova (United States) Pam Shriver	(United States) Kathy Rinaldi (United States) Zina Garrison	(United States) Barbara Potter (Czechoslovakia) Helena Suková (United States) Molly Van Nostrand (United States) Pam Shriver
24 Jun	Wimbledon Championships; London, Great Britain; Grand Slam; Grass – $900,000 – 128S/64Q/64D/64X; Singles – Doubles – Mixed doubles	(United States) Martina Navratilova (Australia) Paul McNamee; 7–5, 4–6, 6–2	(Australia) Elizabeth Smylie (Australia) John Fitzgerald	(United States) Kathy Rinaldi (United States) Zina Garrison	(United States) Barbara Potter (Czechoslovakia) Helena Suková (United States) Molly Van Nostrand (United States) Pam Shriver

=== July ===
Week	Tournament	Champions	Runners-up	Semifinalists	Quarterfinalists
15 Jul	Virginia Slims of Newport; Newport, United States; Grass – $150,000 – 32S/16D	(United States) Chris Evert-Lloyd; 6–4, 6–1	(United States) Pam Shriver	(West Germany) Eva Pfaff (Australia) Wendy Turnbull	(United States) Gigi Fernández (New Zealand) Belinda Cordwell (Australia) Elizabeth Smylie (United States) Lea Antonoplis
15 Jul	Virginia Slims of Newport; Newport, United States; Grass – $150,000 – 32S/16D	(United States) Chris Evert-Lloyd; (Australia) Wendy Turnbull; 6–4, 7–6	(United States) Pam Shriver; (Australia) Elizabeth Smylie	(West Germany) Eva Pfaff (Australia) Wendy Turnbull	(United States) Gigi Fernández (New Zealand) Belinda Cordwell (Australia) Elizabeth Smylie (United States) Lea Antonoplis
15 Jul	Elektra Cup; Bregenz, Austria; Clay – $50,000 – 32S/16D	(Romania) Virginia Ruzici; 6–2, 6–3	(Socialist Federal Republic of Yugoslavia) Mima Jaušovec	(West Germany) Petra Keppeler (Greece) Angelikí Kanellopoúlou	(Czechoslovakia) Regina Maršíková (West Germany) Andrea Betzner (West Germany) Isabel Cueto (Austria) Petra Huber
15 Jul	Elektra Cup; Bregenz, Austria; Clay – $50,000 – 32S/16D	(Socialist Federal Republic of Yugoslavia) Mima Jaušovec; (Romania) Virginia Ruzici; 6–2, 6–3	(Czechoslovakia) Andrea Holíková; (Czechoslovakia) Kateřina Skronská	(West Germany) Petra Keppeler (Greece) Angelikí Kanellopoúlou	(Czechoslovakia) Regina Maršíková (West Germany) Andrea Betzner (West Germany) Isabel Cueto (Austria) Petra Huber
22 Jul	U.S. Clay Court Championships; Indianapolis, United States; Clay – $200,000 – 56S/32D	(Hungary) Andrea Temesvári; 7–6, 6–3	(United States) Zina Garrison	(United States) Kate Gompert (Argentina) Gabriela Sabatini	(Bulgaria) Manuela Maleeva (Italy) Raffaella Reggi (United States) Debbie Spence (United States) Anna Ivan
22 Jul	U.S. Clay Court Championships; Indianapolis, United States; Clay – $200,000 – 56S/32D	(West Germany) Steffi Graf (Argentina) Gabriela Sabatini; 3–6, 6–3, 6–4	(Bulgaria) Katerina Maleeva (Bulgaria) Manuela Maleeva	(United States) Kate Gompert (Argentina) Gabriela Sabatini	(Bulgaria) Manuela Maleeva (Italy) Raffaella Reggi (United States) Debbie Spence (United States) Anna Ivan
29 Jul	Virginia Slims of Los Angeles; Manhattan Beach, United States; Hard – $250,000 – 56S/32D	(West Germany) Claudia Kohde-Kilsch; 6–2, 6–4	(United States) Pam Shriver	(Canada) Carling Bassett (United States) Zina Garrison	(Czechoslovakia) Hana Mandlíková (West Germany) Eva Pfaff (West Germany) Bettina Bunge (United States) Beth Herr
29 Jul	Virginia Slims of Los Angeles; Manhattan Beach, United States; Hard – $250,000 – 56S/32D	(West Germany) Claudia Kohde-Kilsch (Czechoslovakia) Helena Suková; 6–4, 6–2	(Czechoslovakia) Hana Mandlíková (Australia) Wendy Turnbull	(Canada) Carling Bassett (United States) Zina Garrison	(Czechoslovakia) Hana Mandlíková (West Germany) Eva Pfaff (West Germany) Bettina Bunge (United States) Beth Herr

=== August ===
Week	Tournament	Champions	Runners-up	Semifinalists	Quarterfinalists
5 Aug	Canadian Open; Toronto, Canada; Hard – $250,000 – 56S/32D; Singles – Doubles	(United States) Chris Evert-Lloyd; 6–2, 6–4	(West Germany) Claudia Kohde-Kilsch	(Czechoslovakia) Hana Mandlíková (Czechoslovakia) Helena Suková	(United States) Molly Van Nostrand (Argentina) Gabriela Sabatini (Canada) Carling Bassett (United States) Martina Navratilova
5 Aug	Canadian Open; Toronto, Canada; Hard – $250,000 – 56S/32D; Singles – Doubles	(United States) Gigi Fernández (United States) Martina Navratilova; 6–4, 6–0	(Netherlands) Marcella Mesker (France) Pascale Paradis	(Czechoslovakia) Hana Mandlíková (Czechoslovakia) Helena Suková	(United States) Molly Van Nostrand (Argentina) Gabriela Sabatini (Canada) Carling Bassett (United States) Martina Navratilova
12 Aug	United Jersey Bank Classic; Mahwah, United States; Hard – $150,000 – 56S/32D; Singles – Doubles	(United States) Kathy Rinaldi; 6–4, 3–6. 6–4	(West Germany) Steffi Graf	(Argentina) Gabriela Sabatini (Sweden) Catarina Lindqvist	(United States) Pam Shriver (United States) Kathy Jordan (Czechoslovakia) Helena Suková (United States) Kathy Rinaldi
12 Aug	United Jersey Bank Classic; Mahwah, United States; Hard – $150,000 – 56S/32D; Singles – Doubles	(United States) Kathy Jordan (Australia) Elizabeth Smylie; 7–6, 6–3	(West Germany) Claudia Kohde-Kilsch (Czechoslovakia) Helena Suková	(Argentina) Gabriela Sabatini (Sweden) Catarina Lindqvist	(United States) Pam Shriver (United States) Kathy Jordan (Czechoslovakia) Helena Suková (United States) Kathy Rinaldi
19 Aug	Virginia Slims of New York; Monticello, United States; Hard – $75,000 – 32S/16D	(United States) Barbara Potter; 4–6, 6–3, 6–2	(Canada) Helen Kelesi	(Czechoslovakia) Helena Suková (West Germany) Sylvia Hanika	(United States) Debbie Spence (Romania) Virginia Ruzici (United Kingdom) Jo Durie (Italy) Sandra Cecchini
19 Aug	Virginia Slims of New York; Monticello, United States; Hard – $75,000 – 32S/16D	(Argentina) Mercedes Paz (Argentina) Gabriela Sabatini; 5–7, 6–4, 6–3	(Czechoslovakia) Andrea Holíková (Czechoslovakia) Kateřina Skronská	(Czechoslovakia) Helena Suková (West Germany) Sylvia Hanika	(United States) Debbie Spence (Romania) Virginia Ruzici (United Kingdom) Jo Durie (Italy) Sandra Cecchini
26 Aug	US Open; New York City, United States; Grand Slam; Hard – $1,250,000 – 128S/64D/32X; Singles – Doubles – Mixed doubles	(Czechoslovakia) Hana Mandlíková; 7–6^{(7–3)}, 1–6, 7–6^{(7–2)}	(United States) Martina Navratilova	(United States) Chris Evert-Lloyd (West Germany) Steffi Graf	(West Germany) Claudia Kohde-Kilsch (Czechoslovakia) Helena Suková (United States) Pam Shriver (United States) Zina Garrison
26 Aug	US Open; New York City, United States; Grand Slam; Hard – $1,250,000 – 128S/64D/32X; Singles – Doubles – Mixed doubles	(West Germany) Claudia Kohde-Kilsch (Czechoslovakia) Helena Suková; 6–7^{(5–7)}, 6–2, 6–3	(United States) Martina Navratilova (United States) Pam Shriver	(United States) Chris Evert-Lloyd (West Germany) Steffi Graf	(West Germany) Claudia Kohde-Kilsch (Czechoslovakia) Helena Suková (United States) Pam Shriver (United States) Zina Garrison
26 Aug	US Open; New York City, United States; Grand Slam; Hard – $1,250,000 – 128S/64D/32X; Singles – Doubles – Mixed doubles	(United States) Martina Navratilova (Switzerland) Heinz Günthardt; 6–3, 6–4	(United States) Elizabeth Smylie (Australia) John Fitzgerald	(United States) Chris Evert-Lloyd (West Germany) Steffi Graf	(West Germany) Claudia Kohde-Kilsch (Czechoslovakia) Helena Suková (United States) Pam Shriver (United States) Zina Garrison

=== September ===
Week	Tournament	Champions	Runners-up	Semifinalists	Quarterfinalists
9 Sep	Virginia Slims of Utah; Salt Lake City, United States; Hard – $75,000 – 32S/16D/31Q	(United States) Stephanie Rehe; 6–2, 6–4	(United States) Camille Benjamin	(Peru) Laura Arraya (United States) Caroline Kuhlman	(South Africa) Rosalyn Nideffer (United States) Patty Fendick (Australia) Janine Thompson (United States) Emilse Raponi-Longo
9 Sep	Virginia Slims of Utah; Salt Lake City, United States; Hard – $75,000 – 32S/16D/31Q	(Soviet Union) Svetlana Cherneva (Soviet Union) Larisa Savchenko; 7–5, 6–2	(South Africa) Rosalyn Nideffer (South Africa) Beverly Mould	(Peru) Laura Arraya (United States) Caroline Kuhlman	(South Africa) Rosalyn Nideffer (United States) Patty Fendick (Australia) Janine Thompson (United States) Emilse Raponi-Longo
16 Sep	Virginia Slims of Chicago; Chicago, United States; Carpet (i) – $150,000 – 31S/16D/31Q; Singles – Doubles	(United States) Bonnie Gadusek; 6–1, 6–3	(United States) Kathy Rinaldi	(United States) Kathy Jordan (Australia) Wendy Turnbull	(United States) Pam Shriver (United States) Susan Mascarin (United States) Barbara Potter (United States) Elise Burgin
16 Sep	Virginia Slims of Chicago; Chicago, United States; Carpet (i) – $150,000 – 31S/16D/31Q; Singles – Doubles	(United States) Kathy Jordan (Australia) Elizabeth Smylie; 6–2, 6–2	(United States) Elise Burgin (United States) JoAnne Russell	(United States) Kathy Jordan (Australia) Wendy Turnbull	(United States) Pam Shriver (United States) Susan Mascarin (United States) Barbara Potter (United States) Elise Burgin
23 Sep	Virginia Slims of New Orleans; New Orleans, United States; Carpet (i) – $150,000 – 32S/16D/32Q	(United States) Chris Evert-Lloyd; 6–4, 7–5	(United States) Pam Shriver	(United States) Lisa Bonder (United States) Anne White	(United States) Kim Shaefer (United States) Candy Reynolds (United States) Peanut Louie (Australia) Wendy Turnbull
23 Sep	Virginia Slims of New Orleans; New Orleans, United States; Carpet (i) – $150,000 – 32S/16D/32Q	(United States) Chris Evert-Lloyd (Australia) Wendy Turnbull; 6–1, 6–2	(United States) Mary Lou Piatek (United States) Anne White	(United States) Lisa Bonder (United States) Anne White	(United States) Kim Shaefer (United States) Candy Reynolds (United States) Peanut Louie (Australia) Wendy Turnbull
30 Sep	Lynda Carter/Maybelline Classic; Fort Lauderdale, United States; Hard – $150,000 – 32S/16D/32Q	(United States) Martina Navratilova; 6–3, 6–1	(West Germany) Steffi Graf	(United States) Peanut Louie (United States) Bonnie Gadusek	(United States) Terry Phelps (United States) Michelle Torres (Australia) Dianne Balestrat (United States) Stephanie Rehe
30 Sep	Lynda Carter/Maybelline Classic; Fort Lauderdale, United States; Hard – $150,000 – 32S/16D/32Q	(United States) Gigi Fernández (United States) Robin White; 6–2, 7–5	(South Africa) Rosalyn Nideffer (South Africa) Beverly Mould	(United States) Peanut Louie (United States) Bonnie Gadusek	(United States) Terry Phelps (United States) Michelle Torres (Australia) Dianne Balestrat (United States) Stephanie Rehe

=== October ===
Week	Tournament	Champions	Runners-up	Semifinalists	Quarterfinalists
7 Oct	Federation Cup; Nagoya, Japan; Team event Hard	Czechoslovakia; 2–1	United States	Bulgaria; Australia	Hungary; Great Britain; Argentina; Italy
7 Oct	Virginia Slims of Indianapolis; Indianapolis, United States; Hard – $75,000 – 32S/16D/32Q	(United States) Bonnie Gadusek; 6–0, 6–3	(United States) Pam Casale	(United States) Kathy Rinaldi (Czechoslovakia) Iva Budařová	(United States) Melissa Gurney (United States) Candy Reynolds (Canada) Helen Kelesi (United States) Mary Lou Piatek
7 Oct	Virginia Slims of Indianapolis; Indianapolis, United States; Hard – $75,000 – 32S/16D/32Q	(United States) Bonnie Gadusek; (United States) Mary Lou Piatek; 6–1, 6–0	(United States) Penny Barg (United States) Sandy Collins	(United States) Kathy Rinaldi (Czechoslovakia) Iva Budařová	(United States) Melissa Gurney (United States) Candy Reynolds (Canada) Helen Kelesi (United States) Mary Lou Piatek
14 Oct	Porsche Classic; Stuttgart, West Germany; Carpet (i) – $175,000 – 32S/16D/32Q	(United States) Pam Shriver; 6–1, 7–6	(Sweden) Catarina Lindqvist	(West Germany) Steffi Graf (West Germany) Claudia Kohde-Kilsch	(Czechoslovakia) Iva Budařová (United States) Lisa Bonder (Italy) Raffaella Reggi (United States) Barbara Gerken
14 Oct	Porsche Classic; Stuttgart, West Germany; Carpet (i) – $175,000 – 32S/16D/32Q	(Czechoslovakia) Hana Mandlíková (United States) Pam Shriver; 6–2, 6–1	(Sweden) Carina Karlsson (Denmark) Tine Scheuer-Larsen	(West Germany) Steffi Graf (West Germany) Claudia Kohde-Kilsch	(Czechoslovakia) Iva Budařová (United States) Lisa Bonder (Italy) Raffaella Reggi (United States) Barbara Gerken
14 Oct	Suntory Japan Open; Tokyo, Japan; Hard – $50,000 – 32S/16D/32Q; Singles – Doubles	(Argentina) Gabriela Sabatini; 6–3, 6–4	(United States) Linda Gates	(Switzerland) Lilian Drescher (Peru) Laura Arraya	(Czechoslovakia) Andrea Holíková (Greece) Angeliki Kanellopoulou (United States) Amy Holton (West Germany) Myriam Schropp
14 Oct	Suntory Japan Open; Tokyo, Japan; Hard – $50,000 – 32S/16D/32Q; Singles – Doubles	(New Zealand) Belinda Cordwell (New Zealand) Julie Richardson; 6–4, 6–4	(Peru) Laura Arraya (United States) Beth Herr	(Switzerland) Lilian Drescher (Peru) Laura Arraya	(Czechoslovakia) Andrea Holíková (Greece) Angeliki Kanellopoulou (United States) Amy Holton (West Germany) Myriam Schropp
21 Oct	Pretty Polly Classic; Brighton, Great Britain; Carpet (i) – $175,000 – 32S/16D/32Q	(United States) Chris Evert-Lloyd; 7–5, 6–3	(Bulgaria) Manuela Maleeva	(United Kingdom) Annabel Croft (United Kingdom) Jo Durie	(Sweden) Catarina Lindqvist (United States) Terry Phelps (United States) Barbara Potter (Switzerland) Christiane Jolissaint
21 Oct	Pretty Polly Classic; Brighton, Great Britain; Carpet (i) – $175,000 – 32S/16D/32Q	(United States) Lori McNeil (France) Catherine Suire; 4–6, 7–6, 6–4	(United States) Barbara Potter (Czechoslovakia) Helena Suková	(United Kingdom) Annabel Croft (United Kingdom) Jo Durie	(Sweden) Catarina Lindqvist (United States) Terry Phelps (United States) Barbara Potter (Switzerland) Christiane Jolissaint
28 Oct	European Indoors; Zürich, Switzerland; Carpet (i) – $150,000 – 32S/16D/32Q	(United States) Zina Garrison; 6–1, 6–3	(Czechoslovakia) Hana Mandlíková	(Czechoslovakia) Helena Suková (West Germany) Claudia Kohde-Kilsch	(France) Catherine Tanvier (Switzerland) Christiane Jolissaint (Italy) Sandra Cecchini (Bulgaria) Manuela Maleeva
28 Oct	European Indoors; Zürich, Switzerland; Carpet (i) – $150,000 – 32S/16D/32Q	(Czechoslovakia) Hana Mandlíková (Hungary) Andrea Temesvári; 6–4, 3–6, 7–5	(West Germany) Claudia Kohde-Kilsch (Czechoslovakia) Helena Suková	(Czechoslovakia) Helena Suková (West Germany) Claudia Kohde-Kilsch	(France) Catherine Tanvier (Switzerland) Christiane Jolissaint (Italy) Sandra Cecchini (Bulgaria) Manuela Maleeva

=== November ===
Week	Tournament	Champions	Runners-up	Semifinalists	Quarterfinalists
4 Nov	Florida Federal Open; Tampa, United States; Hard – $150,000 – 32S/16D; Singles – Doubles	(United States) Stephanie Rehe; 6–4, 6–7^{(4–7)}, 7–5	(Argentina) Gabriela Sabatini	(United States) Anne White (Canada) Carling Bassett	(United States) Lisa Bonder (United States) Pam Casale (United States) Grace Kim (United States) Michelle Torres
4 Nov	Florida Federal Open; Tampa, United States; Hard – $150,000 – 32S/16D; Singles – Doubles	(Canada) Carling Bassett (Argentina) Gabriela Sabatini; 6–0, 6–0	(United States) Lisa Bonder (Peru) Laura Gildemeister	(United States) Anne White (Canada) Carling Bassett	(United States) Lisa Bonder (United States) Pam Casale (United States) Grace Kim (United States) Michelle Torres
4 Nov	Hewlett-Packard Trophy; Hilversum, Netherlands; Carpet (i) – $75,000 – 32S/16D; Singles – Doubles	(Bulgaria) Katerina Maleeva; 6–3, 6–2	(Sweden) Carina Karlsson	(United States) Zina Garrison (Denmark) Tine Scheuer-Larsen	(France) Nathalie Herreman (Romania) Virginia Ruzici (Austria) Petra Huber (France) Catherine Tanvier
4 Nov	Hewlett-Packard Trophy; Hilversum, Netherlands; Carpet (i) – $75,000 – 32S/16D; Singles – Doubles	(Netherlands) Marcella Mesker (France) Catherine Tanvier; 6–2, 6–2	(Italy) Sandra Cecchini (Socialist Federal Republic of Yugoslavia) Sabrina Goleš	(United States) Zina Garrison (Denmark) Tine Scheuer-Larsen	(France) Nathalie Herreman (Romania) Virginia Ruzici (Austria) Petra Huber (France) Catherine Tanvier
11 Nov	National Panasonic Women's Classic; Brisbane, Australia; Grass – $150,000 – 56S/32D/32Q	(United States) Martina Navratilova; 6–3, 7–5	(United States) Pam Shriver	(West Germany) Claudia Kohde-Kilsch (Czechoslovakia) Helena Suková	(United Kingdom) Sara Gomer (Australia) Wendy Turnbull (United States) Elise Burgin (Soviet Union) Larisa Savchenko
11 Nov	National Panasonic Women's Classic; Brisbane, Australia; Grass – $150,000 – 56S/32D/32Q	(United States) Martina Navratilova (United States) Pam Shriver; 6–4, 6–7^{(6–8)}, 6–1	(West Germany) Claudia Kohde-Kilsch (Czechoslovakia) Helena Suková	(West Germany) Claudia Kohde-Kilsch (Czechoslovakia) Helena Suková	(United Kingdom) Sara Gomer (Australia) Wendy Turnbull (United States) Elise Burgin (Soviet Union) Larisa Savchenko
11 Nov	Lion's Cup; Tokyo, Japan; Carpet – $100,000 – 4S; Singles	(United States) Chris Evert; 7–5, 6–0	(Bulgaria) Manuela Maleeva-Fragniere	(United States) Lisa Bonder-Kreiss (Canada) Carling Bassett-Seguso	
18 Nov	Family Circle NSW Open; Sydney, Australia; Grass – $150,000 – 56S/32D/32Q	(United States) Martina Navratilova; 3–6, 6–1, 6–3	(Czechoslovakia) Hana Mandlíková	(Czechoslovakia) Helena Suková (West Germany) Claudia Kohde-Kilsch	(Australia) Wendy Turnbull (Australia) Dianne Balestrat (Switzerland) Christiane Jolissaint (Soviet Union) Svetlana Cherneva
18 Nov	Family Circle NSW Open; Sydney, Australia; Grass – $150,000 – 56S/32D/32Q	(Czechoslovakia) Hana Mandlíková (Australia) Wendy Turnbull; 3–6, 7–6, 6–4	(South Africa) Rosalyn Fairbank (United States) Candy Reynolds	(Czechoslovakia) Helena Suková (West Germany) Claudia Kohde-Kilsch	(Australia) Wendy Turnbull (Australia) Dianne Balestrat (Switzerland) Christiane Jolissaint (Soviet Union) Svetlana Cherneva
25 Nov	Australian Open; Melbourne, Australia; Grand Slam $645,225 -Grass – 64S/32Q/32D; Singles – Doubles	(United States) Martina Navratilova; 6–2, 4–6, 6–2	(United States) Chris Evert-Lloyd	(West Germany) Claudia Kohde-Kilsch (Czechoslovakia) Hana Mandlíková	(Bulgaria) Manuela Maleeva (Sweden) Catarina Lindqvist (United States) Zina Garrison (Czechoslovakia) Helena Suková
25 Nov	Australian Open; Melbourne, Australia; Grand Slam $645,225 -Grass – 64S/32Q/32D; Singles – Doubles	(United States) Martina Navratilova (United States) Pam Shriver; 6–3, 6–4	(West Germany) Claudia Kohde-Kilsch (Czechoslovakia) Helena Suková	(West Germany) Claudia Kohde-Kilsch (Czechoslovakia) Hana Mandlíková	(Bulgaria) Manuela Maleeva (Sweden) Catarina Lindqvist (United States) Zina Garrison (Czechoslovakia) Helena Suková

=== December ===
Week	Tournament	Champions	Runners-up	Semifinalists	Quarterfinalists
9 Dec	Pan Pacific Open; Tokyo, Japan; Carpet (i) – $250,000 – 28S/16D/29Q	(Bulgaria) Manuela Maleeva; 7–6, 3–6, 7–5	(United States) Bonnie Gadusek	(West Germany) Claudia Kohde-Kilsch (Czechoslovakia) Helena Suková	(United States) Grace Kim (Canada) Carling Bassett (United Kingdom) Annabel Croft (United States) Stephanie Rehe
9 Dec	Pan Pacific Open; Tokyo, Japan; Carpet (i) – $250,000 – 28S/16D/29Q	(West Germany) Claudia Kohde-Kilsch (Czechoslovakia) Helena Suková; 6–0, 6–4	(Netherlands) Marcella Mesker (Australia) Elizabeth Smylie	(West Germany) Claudia Kohde-Kilsch (Czechoslovakia) Helena Suková	(United States) Grace Kim (Canada) Carling Bassett (United Kingdom) Annabel Croft (United States) Stephanie Rehe
9 Dec	Nutri-Metics Open; Auckland, New Zealand $50,000 – grass −16S/16D/32Q; Singles – Doubles	(United Kingdom) Anne Hobbs; 6–3, 6–1	(Australia) Louise Field	(United States) Beth Norton (United States) Anna-Maria Fernandez	(Australia) Stephanie Faulkner (United States) Lea Antonoplis (New Zealand) Julie Richardson (United States) Candy Reynolds
9 Dec	Nutri-Metics Open; Auckland, New Zealand $50,000 – grass −16S/16D/32Q; Singles – Doubles	(United Kingdom) Anne Hobbs (United States) Candy Reynolds; 6–1, 6–3	(United States) Lea Antonoplis (Argentina) Adriana Villagrán	(United States) Beth Norton (United States) Anna-Maria Fernandez	(Australia) Stephanie Faulkner (United States) Lea Antonoplis (New Zealand) Julie Richardson (United States) Candy Reynolds

=== January 1986 ===
Week	Tournament	Champions	Runners-up	Semifinalists	Quarterfinalists
6 Jan	Virginia Slims of Washington; Washington, United States; Carpet (i) – $150,000 – 32S/16D/32Q	(United States) Martina Navratilova; 6–1, 6–4	(United States) Pam Shriver	(West Germany) Claudia Kohde-Kilsch (Bulgaria) Manuela Maleeva	(United States) Zina Garrison (West Germany) Bettina Bunge (Czechoslovakia) Helena Suková (United States) Bonnie Gadusek
6 Jan	Virginia Slims of Washington; Washington, United States; Carpet (i) – $150,000 – 32S/16D/32Q	(United States) Martina Navratilova (United States) Pam Shriver; 6–3, 6–4	(West Germany) Claudia Kohde-Kilsch (Czechoslovakia) Helena Suková	(West Germany) Claudia Kohde-Kilsch (Bulgaria) Manuela Maleeva	(United States) Zina Garrison (West Germany) Bettina Bunge (Czechoslovakia) Helena Suková (United States) Bonnie Gadusek
13 Jan	Virginia Slims of New England ^{(Jan)} Worcester, United States; Carpet (i) – $250,000 – 56S/16D/32Q	(United States) Martina Navratilova; 4–6, 6–1, 6–4	(West Germany) Claudia Kohde-Kilsch	(United States) Pam Shriver (United States) Kathy Rinaldi	(United States) Bonnie Gadusek (Czechoslovakia) Helena Suková (United Kingdom) Jo Durie (Canada) Helen Kelesi
13 Jan	Virginia Slims of New England ^{(Jan)} Worcester, United States; Carpet (i) – $250,000 – 56S/16D/32Q	(United States) Martina Navratilova (United States) Pam Shriver; 7–5, 6–3	(West Germany) Claudia Kohde-Kilsch (Czechoslovakia) Helena Suková	(United States) Pam Shriver (United States) Kathy Rinaldi	(United States) Bonnie Gadusek (Czechoslovakia) Helena Suková (United Kingdom) Jo Durie (Canada) Helen Kelesi
20 Jan	Virginia Slims of Kansas; Kansas City, United States; Carpet – $75,000 – 32S/16D	(United States) Wendy White; 6–1, 6–7^{(5–7)}, 6–2	(United States) Betsy Nagelsen	(United States) Ann Henricksson (Netherlands) Marcella Mesker	(Japan) Akiko Kijimuta (United States) Kate Gompert (United States) Camille Benjamin (United States) Anne Smith
20 Jan	Virginia Slims of Kansas; Kansas City, United States; Carpet – $75,000 – 32S/16D	(United States) Kathy Jordan (United States) Candy Reynolds; 6–3, 6–7^{(5–7)}, 6–3	(United States) JoAnne Russell (United States) Anne Smith	(United States) Ann Henricksson (Netherlands) Marcella Mesker	(Japan) Akiko Kijimuta (United States) Kate Gompert (United States) Camille Benjamin (United States) Anne Smith
27 Jan	Virginia Slims of Florida; Key Biscayne, United States; Hard – $250,000 – 56S/32D; Singles – Doubles	(United States) Chris Evert-Lloyd; 6–3, 6–1	(West Germany) Steffi Graf	(Bulgaria) Manuela Maleeva (United States) Bonnie Gadusek	(United States) Stephanie Rehe (Argentina) Gabriela Sabatini (United States) Kathleen Horvath (Australia) Wendy Turnbull
27 Jan	Virginia Slims of Florida; Key Biscayne, United States; Hard – $250,000 – 56S/32D; Singles – Doubles	(United States) Kathy Jordan (Australia) Elizabeth Smylie; 7–6, 2–6, 6–2	(United States) Betsy Nagelsen (United States) Barbara Potter	(Bulgaria) Manuela Maleeva (United States) Bonnie Gadusek	(United States) Stephanie Rehe (Argentina) Gabriela Sabatini (United States) Kathleen Horvath (Australia) Wendy Turnbull

=== February 1986 ===
Week	Tournament	Champions	Runners-up	Semifinalists	Quarterfinalists
10 Feb	Lipton International Players Championships; Boca West, United States; Hard – $750,000 – 128S/64D; Singles – Doubles	(United States) Chris Evert-Lloyd; 6–4, 6–2	(West Germany) Steffi Graf	(United States) Kathy Rinaldi (Czechoslovakia) Helena Suková	(United States) Terry Phelps (Canada) Carling Bassett (United States) Barbara Potter (United States) Zina Garrison
10 Feb	Lipton International Players Championships; Boca West, United States; Hard – $750,000 – 128S/64D; Singles – Doubles	(United States) Pam Shriver (Czechoslovakia) Helena Suková; 6–2, 6–3	(United States) Chris Evert-Lloyd (Australia) Wendy Turnbull	(United States) Kathy Rinaldi (Czechoslovakia) Helena Suková	(United States) Terry Phelps (Canada) Carling Bassett (United States) Barbara Potter (United States) Zina Garrison
24 Feb	Virginia Slims of California; Oakland, United States; Carpet (i) – $150,000 – 28S/16D	(United States) Chris Evert-Lloyd; 6–2, 6–4	(United States) Kathy Jordan	(United States) Martina Navratilova (Czechoslovakia) Helena Suková	(United States) Zina Garrison (United States) Wendy White (United States) Alycia Moulton (Australia) Wendy Turnbull
24 Feb	Virginia Slims of California; Oakland, United States; Carpet (i) – $150,000 – 28S/16D	(Czechoslovakia) Hana Mandlíková (Australia) Wendy Turnbull; 7–6^{(7–5)}, 6–1	(United States) Bonnie Gadusek (Czechoslovakia) Helena Suková	(United States) Martina Navratilova (Czechoslovakia) Helena Suková	(United States) Zina Garrison (United States) Wendy White (United States) Alycia Moulton (Australia) Wendy Turnbull
24 Feb	Virginia Slims of Oklahoma; Oklahoma City, United States; Carpet (i) – $75,000 – 32S/16D	(Netherlands) Marcella Mesker; 6–4, 4–6, 6–3	(United States) Lori McNeil	(United States) Beth Herr (United States) Candy Reynolds	(United States) Kathleen Horvath (Peru) Laura Gildemeister (France) Nathalie Herreman (United States) Hu Na
24 Feb	Virginia Slims of Oklahoma; Oklahoma City, United States; Carpet (i) – $75,000 – 32S/16D	(Netherlands) Marcella Mesker (France) Pascale Paradis; 2–6, 7–6^{(7–1)}, 6–1	(United States) Lori McNeil (France) Catherine Suire	(United States) Beth Herr (United States) Candy Reynolds	(United States) Kathleen Horvath (Peru) Laura Gildemeister (France) Nathalie Herreman (United States) Hu Na

=== March 1986 ===
Week	Tournament	Champions	Runners-up	Semifinalists	Quarterfinalists
3 Mar	US Indoors; Princeton, United States; Carpet (i) – $150,000 – 32S/16D	(United States) Martina Navratilova; 3–6, 6–0, 7–6^{(7–5)}	(Czechoslovakia) Helena Suková	(United States) Pam Shriver (Czechoslovakia) Hana Mandlíková	(United States) Alycia Moulton (Australia) Dianne Balestrat (United States) Terry Phelps (United States) Kathy Jordan
3 Mar	US Indoors; Princeton, United States; Carpet (i) – $150,000 – 32S/16D	(United States) Kathy Jordan (Australia) Elizabeth Smylie; 7–5, 6–2	(Czechoslovakia) Hana Mandlíková (Czechoslovakia) Helena Suková	(United States) Pam Shriver (Czechoslovakia) Hana Mandlíková	(United States) Alycia Moulton (Australia) Dianne Balestrat (United States) Terry Phelps (United States) Kathy Jordan
3 Mar	Virginia Slims of Pennsylvania; Hershey, United States; Hard (i) – $75,000 – 32S/16D; Singles – Doubles	(Australia) Janine Thompson; 6–1, 6–4	(France) Catherine Suire	(Soviet Union) Larisa Savchenko (United States) Anne Smith	(West Germany) Andrea Betzner (Australia) Anne Minter (Soviet Union) Svetlana Cherneva (United States) Lori McNeil
3 Mar	Virginia Slims of Pennsylvania; Hershey, United States; Hard (i) – $75,000 – 32S/16D; Singles – Doubles	(United States) Candy Reynolds (United States) Anne Smith; 7–6, 6–1	(United States) Sandy Collins (United States) Kim Sands	(Soviet Union) Larisa Savchenko (United States) Anne Smith	(West Germany) Andrea Betzner (Australia) Anne Minter (Soviet Union) Svetlana Cherneva (United States) Lori McNeil
10 Mar	Virginia Slims of Dallas; Dallas, United States; Carpet (i) – $250,000 – 56S/28D	(United States) Martina Navratilova; 6–2, 6–1	(United States) Chris Evert-Lloyd	(Czechoslovakia) Hana Mandlíková (United States) Kathy Rinaldi	(Czechoslovakia) Helena Suková (United States) Robin White (United States) Stephanie Rehe (United States) Zina Garrison
10 Mar	Virginia Slims of Dallas; Dallas, United States; Carpet (i) – $250,000 – 56S/28D	(West Germany) Claudia Kohde-Kilsch (Czechoslovakia) Helena Suková; 4–6, 7–5, 6–4	(Czechoslovakia) Hana Mandlíková (Australia) Wendy Turnbull	(Czechoslovakia) Hana Mandlíková (United States) Kathy Rinaldi	(Czechoslovakia) Helena Suková (United States) Robin White (United States) Stephanie Rehe (United States) Zina Garrison
17 Mar	Virginia Slims Championships; New York City, United States; Carpet (i) – $500,000 – 16S/8D; Singles – Doubles	(United States) Martina Navratilova; 6–2, 6–0, 3–6, 6–2	(Czechoslovakia) Hana Mandlíková	(West Germany) Steffi Graf (United States) Chris Evert-Lloyd	(United States) Bonnie Gadusek (United States) Pam Shriver (West Germany) Claudia Kohde-Kilsch (Czechoslovakia) Helena Suková
17 Mar	Virginia Slims Championships; New York City, United States; Carpet (i) – $500,000 – 16S/8D; Singles – Doubles	(Czechoslovakia) Hana Mandlíková (Australia) Wendy Turnbull; 6–4, 6–7^{(4–7)}, 6–3	(West Germany) Claudia Kohde-Kilsch (Czechoslovakia) Helena Suková	(West Germany) Steffi Graf (United States) Chris Evert-Lloyd	(United States) Bonnie Gadusek (United States) Pam Shriver (West Germany) Claudia Kohde-Kilsch (Czechoslovakia) Helena Suková

== Statistical information ==
=== Titles won by player ===
These tables present the number of singles (S), doubles (D), and mixed doubles (X) titles won by each player and each nation during the season, within all the tournament categories of the 1985 Virginia Slims World Championship Series: the Grand Slam tournaments, the Year-end championships and regular events. The players/nations are sorted by:

1. total number of titles (a doubles title won by two players representing the same nation counts as only one win for the nation);
2. highest amount of highest category tournaments (for example, having a single Grand Slam gives preference over any kind of combination without a Grand Slam title);
3. a singles > doubles > mixed doubles hierarchy;
4. alphabetical order (by family names for players).

Total titles	Player	Grand Slam tournaments			Year-end championships		Regular tournaments		All titles		
Total titles	Player	Singles	Doubles	Mixed	Singles	Doubles	Singles	Doubles	Singles	Doubles	Mixed

=== Titles won by nation ===
Total titles	Country	Grand Slam tournaments			Year-end championships		Regular tournaments		All titles		
Total titles	Country	Singles	Doubles	Mixed	Singles	Doubles	Singles	Doubles	Singles	Doubles	Mixed

== Rankings ==
=== Singles ===
As of December 1984
Rk	Name	Nation	Points
1	Martina Navratilova	USA	192.72
2	Chris Evert	USA	151.14
3	Hana Mandlíková	TCH	68.40
4	Pam Shriver	USA	64.84
5	Wendy Turnbull	AUS	62.73
6	Manuela Maleeva	BUL	58.03
7	Helena Suková	TCH	56.11
8	Claudia Kohde-Kilsch	FRG	55.17
9	Zina Garrison	USA	49.46
10	Kathy Jordan	USA	45.22

Final rankings as of (December 1985)
Rk	Name	Nation	Points	High	Low	Change
1	Martina Navratilova	USA	191.32	1	1	NC
2	Chris Evert	USA	175.03			NC
3	Hana Mandlíková	TCH	103.19			NC
4	Pam Shriver	USA	89.77			NC
5	Claudia Kohde-Kilsch	FRG	87.52			+3
6	Steffi Graf	FRG	77.73			NR
7	Manuela Maleeva	BUL	70.83			-1
8	Zina Garrison	USA	69.60			+1
9	Helena Suková	TCH	65.62			-2
10	Bonnie Gadusek	USA	61.05			NR

== Awards ==
The winners of the 1985 WTA Awards were announced in 1986.

== See also ==
- 1985 Nabisco Grand Prix – men's circuit
- Women's Tennis Association
- International Tennis Federation
