= 1986 Virginia Slims of Pennsylvania – Doubles =

Doubles
- 1986 Virginia Slims of Pennsylvania

Final
- Champions: (United States) Candy Reynolds (United States) Anne Smith
- Runners-up: (United States) Sandy Collins (United States) Kim Sands
- Score: 7–6, 6–1

Events
Singles	Doubles
← 1985 ·	Virginia Slims of Pennsylvania

Mary Lou Piatek and Robin White were the defending champions, but neither competed this year.

Candy Reynolds and Anne Smith won the title by defeating Sandy Collins and Kim Sands 7–6, 6–1 in the final.

== Seeds ==
1. (Soviet Union) Svetlana Parkhomenko / (Soviet Union) Larisa Savchenko (quarterfinals, withdrew)
2. (United States) Lori McNeil / (France) Catherine Suire (semifinals)
3. (United States) Candy Reynolds / (United States) Anne Smith (champions)
4. (United States) Sandy Collins / (United States) Kim Sands (final)

== Draw ==
=== Key ===
- Q = Qualifier
- WC = Wild card
- LL = Lucky loser
- Alt = Alternate
- SE = Special exempt
- PR = Protected ranking
- ITF = ITF entry
- JE = Junior exempt
- w/o = Walkover
- r = Retired
- d = Defaulted
- SR = Special ranking

=== Draw ===
First round
1	(Soviet Union) S Parkhomenko (Soviet Union) L Savchenko	7	6
(New Zealand) J Richardson (Australia) J Thompson	6	4
(United States) L Allen (Czechoslovakia) I Budařová	6	6	0
(West Germany) A Betzner (West Germany) M Schropp	4	7	6
4	(United States) S Collins (United States) K Sands	6	6
(United States) V Nelson-Dunbar (United States) Carol Watson	3	3
(United States) R Blount (Australia) A Tobin-Dingwall	6	4	2
(Australia) A Minter (Australia) E Minter	3	6	6
(United States) H Na (Argentina) A Villagrán	7	7
(United States) H Crowe (United States) K Steinmetz	6	6
(New Zealand) B Cordwell (Australia) L Field	6	2
3	(United States) C Reynolds (United States) A Smith	7	6
(United States) C Copeland (United States) T Mochizuki	6	6
(United States) D Farrell (United States) J Goodling	4	1
(France) S Amiach (United States) H Ludloff	6	4
2	(United States) L McNeil (France) C Suire	7	6

Quarterfinals
1	(Soviet Union) S Parkhomenko (Soviet Union) L Savchenko
(West Germany) A Betzner (West Germany) M Schropp	w/o
4	(United States) S Collins (United States) K Sands	5	7	6
(Australia) A Minter (Australia) E Minter	7	6	3
(United States) H Na (Argentina) A Villagrán	1	2
3	(United States) C Reynolds (United States) A Smith	6	6
(United States) C Copeland (United States) T Mochizuki	0	1
2	(United States) L McNeil (France) C Suire	6	6

Semifinals
(West Germany) A Betzner (West Germany) M Schropp	5	1
4	(United States) S Collins (United States) K Sands	7	6
3	(United States) C Reynolds (United States) A Smith	7	7
2	(United States) L McNeil (France) C Suire	6	5

Final
4	(United States) S Collins (United States) K Sands	6	1
3	(United States) C Reynolds (United States) A Smith	7	6
