= 1986 Virginia Slims of Pennsylvania – Singles =

Singles
- 1986 Virginia Slims of Pennsylvania

Final
- Champion: (Australia) Janine Thompson
- Runner-up: (France) Catherine Suire
- Score: 6–1, 6–4

Details
- Draw: 32
- Seeds: 8

Events
Singles	Doubles
← 1985 ·	Virginia Slims of Pennsylvania

Robin White was the defending champion, but did not compete this year.

Janine Thompson won the title by defeating Catherine Suire 6–1, 6–4 in the final.

== Seeds ==
1. (United States) Stephanie Rehe (second round)
2. (Czechoslovakia) Iva Budařová (second round)
3. (Soviet Union) Svetlana Parkhomenko (quarterfinals)
4. (Soviet Union) Larisa Savchenko (semifinals)
5. (United States) Candy Reynolds (first round)
6. (United States) Anne Smith (semifinals)
7. (United States) Lori McNeil (quarterfinals)
8. (Australia) Anne Minter (quarterfinals)

== Draw ==
=== Key ===
- Q = Qualifier
- WC = Wild card
- LL = Lucky loser
- Alt = Alternate
- SE = Special exempt
- PR = Protected ranking
- ITF = ITF entry
- JE = Junior exempt
- w/o = Walkover
- r = Retired
- d = Defaulted
- SR = Special ranking

=== Finals ===
Semifinals
(France) Catherine Suire	7	6
4	(Soviet Union) Larisa Savchenko	6	4
6	(United States) Anne Smith	5	4
(Australia) Janine Thompson	7	6

Final
(France) Catherine Suire	1	4
(Australia) Janine Thompson	6	6

=== Top half ===
First round
1	(United States) S Rehe	6	6
(United Kingdom) S Gomer	4	4
(United States) A Holton	4	0
(France) C Suire	6	6
(United States) S Sloane	6	6
(United States) K McDonald	1	4
(West Germany) A Betzner	2	7	7
5	(United States) C Reynolds	6	5	6
4	(Soviet Union) L Savchenko	6	6
(United States) T Mochizuki	4	1
(Argentina) A Villagrán	6	6
(New Zealand) B Cordwell	3	2
(Australia) A Tobin-Dingwall	6	7
(United States) K Cummings	4	6
(Japan) E Inoue	3	1
8	(Australia) A Minter	6	6

Second round
1	(United States) S Rehe	6	3	4
(France) C Suire	3	6	6
(United States) S Sloane	2	6
(West Germany) A Betzner	6	7
4	(Soviet Union) L Savchenko	6	6
(Argentina) A Villagrán	1	0
(Australia) A Tobin-Dingwall	0	4
8	(Australia) A Minter	6	6

Quarterfinals
(France) C Suire	6	6	7
(West Germany) A Betzner	7	4	6
4	(Soviet Union) L Savchenko	4	6	6
8	(Australia) A Minter	6	1	4

Semifinals
(France) C Suire	7	6
4	(Soviet Union) L Savchenko	6	4

=== Bottom half ===
First round
6	(United States) A Smith	6	6
(United States) L Spain Short	0	3
(West Germany) M Schropp	6	6
(United States) J Klitch	2	4
(Argentina) M Paz	6	7
(United States) K Sands	3	6
(United States) H Na	4	3
3	(Soviet Union) S Parkhomenko	6	6
7	(United States) L McNeil	7	6
(United States) V Nelson-Dunbar	6	3
(Australia) Z Minter	5	0
(Japan) M Yanagi	7	6
(Australia) J Thompson	7	6
(United States) J Goodling	6	1
(Australia) L Field	6	2
2	(Czechoslovakia) I Budařová	7	6

Second round
6	(United States) A Smith	6	6
(West Germany) M Schropp	2	4
(Argentina) M Paz	0	6	3
3	(Soviet Union) S Parkhomenko	6	2	6
7	(United States) L McNeil	3	6	6
(Japan) M Yanagi	6	2	3
(Australia) J Thompson	7	7
2	(Czechoslovakia) I Budařová	6	6

Quarterfinals
6	(United States) A Smith	7	6
3	(Soviet Union) S Parkhomenko	5	2
7	(United States) L McNeil	5	7	6
(Australia) J Thompson	7	6	7

Semifinals
6	(United States) A Smith	5	4
(Australia) J Thompson	7	6
