= 1984 United Jersey Bank Classic – Singles =

Singles
- 1984 United Jersey Bank Classic

Final
- Champion: (United States) Martina Navratilova
- Runner-up: (United States) Pam Shriver
- Score: 6–4, 4–6, 7–5

Details
- Draw: 56
- Seeds: 14

Events
| Singles | Doubles |
- WTA New Jersey

Jo Durie was the defending champion, but lost in the second round to Catarina Lindqvist.

Martina Navratilova won the title by defeating Pam Shriver 6–4, 4–6, 7–5 in the final.

== Seeds ==
The first eight seeds received a bye to the second round.

1. (United States) Martina Navratilova (champion)
2. (United States) Pam Shriver (final)
3. (Bulgaria) Manuela Maleeva (quarterfinals)
4. (United States) Zina Garrison (semifinals)
5. (United States) Bonnie Gadusek (quarterfinals)
6. (United Kingdom) Jo Durie (second round)
7. (United States) Barbara Potter (quarterfinals)
8. (Czechoslovakia) Helena Suková (third round)
9. (West Germany) Sylvia Hanika (third round, retired)
10. (Peru) Laura Arraya (first round)
11. (United States) Kathy Rinaldi (third round)
12. (Romania) Virginia Ruzici (first round)
13. (United States) Pam Casale (semifinals)
14. (South Africa) Rosalyn Fairbank (second round)

== Draw ==
Key

- Q = Qualifier
- WC = Wild card
- LL = Lucky loser
- Alt = Alternate
- ITF = ITF entry
- PR = Protected ranking
- SR = Special ranking
- SE = Special exempt
- JE = Junior exempt
- JR = Junior Accelerator Programme entrant
- CO = College Accelerator Programme entrant
- NG = Next Gen Accelerator Program entrant
- w/o = Walkover
- r = Retired
- d = Defaulted

=== Finals ===
Quarterfinals
1 | (United States) Martina Navratilova | 6 | 6
7 | (United States) Barbara Potter | 3 | 1
3 | (Bulgaria) Manuela Maleeva | 6 | 3 | 2
13 | (United States) Pam Casale | 2 | 6 | 6
5 | (United States) Bonnie Gadusek | 2 | 2
4 | (United States) Zina Garrison | 6 | 6
(United States) Camille Benjamin | 1 | 2
2 | (United States) Pam Shriver | 6 | 6

Semifinals
1 | (United States) Martina Navratilova | 6 | 6
13 | (United States) Pam Casale | 2 | 3
4 | (United States) Zina Garrison | 1 | 1
2 | (United States) Pam Shriver | 6 | 6

Final
1 | (United States) Martina Navratilova | 6 | 4 | 7
2 | (United States) Pam Shriver | 4 | 6 | 5

=== Top half ===
==== Section 1 ====
First round
(France) P Paradis | 7 | 7
(France) C Suire | 5 | 6
(United States) K Gompert | 4 | 2
(United States) G Rush | 6 | 6
(United States) K Sands | 6 | 6
10 | (Peru) L Arraya | 2 | 4
(United States) V Nelson | 6 | 6
(France) MC Calleja | 3 | 2
(United States) E Burgin | 6 | 1 | 4
(Switzerland) C Jolissaint | 2 | 6 | 6
(United States) A Kiyomura | 2 | 2
(Italy) R Reggi | 6 | 6

Second round
1 | (United States) M Navratilova | 6 | 6
(France) P Paradis | 2 | 2
(United States) G Rush | 3 | 2
(United States) K Sands | 6 | 6
(United States) V Nelson | 6 | 4 | 2
(Switzerland) C Jolissaint | 2 | 6 | 6
(Italy) R Reggi | 1 | 2
7 | (United States) B Potter | 6 | 6

Third round
1 | (United States) M Navratilova | 6 | 6
(United States) K Sands | 2 | 1
(Switzerland) C Jolissaint | 1 | 3
7 | (United States) B Potter | 6 | 6

Quarterfinals
1 | (United States) M Navratilova | 6 | 6
7 | (United States) B Potter | 3 | 1

==== Section 2 ====
First round
(Czechoslovakia) K Skronská | 6 | 0 | 7
(United States) K Shaefer | 3 | 6 | 6
(West Germany) S Graf | 0 | 6 | 6
(United States) ML Piatek | 6 | 0 | 1
(Netherlands) M Mesker | 4 | 5
11 | (United States) K Rinaldi | 6 | 7
13 | (United States) P Casale | 6 | 6
(United States) K Cummings | 1 | 3
(United States) M Brown | 1 | 1
(Denmark) T Scheuer-Larsen | 6 | 6
(United States) B Gerken | 1 | 4
(Sweden) C Lindqvist | 6 | 6

Second round
3 | (Bulgaria) M Maleeva | 6 | 6
(Czechoslovakia) K Skronská | 2 | 2
(West Germany) S Graf | 4 | 4
11 | (United States) K Rinaldi | 6 | 6
13 | (United States) P Casale | 6 | 6
(Denmark) T Scheuer-Larsen | 2 | 4
(Sweden) C Lindqvist | 6 | 6
6 | (United Kingdom) J Durie | 4 | 3

Third round
3 | (Bulgaria) M Maleeva | 6 | 5 | 6
11 | (United States) K Rinaldi | 2 | 7 | 1
13 | (United States) P Casale | 6 | 7
(Sweden) C Lindqvist | 3 | 6

Quarterfinals
3 | (Bulgaria) M Maleeva | 6 | 3 | 2
13 | (United States) P Casale | 2 | 6 | 6

=== Bottom half ===
==== Section 3 ====
First round
(United Kingdom) A Brown | 1 | 1
(Australia) A Minter | 6 | 6
(United States) K Copeland | 6 | 1
(Czechoslovakia) I Budařová | 7 | 6
(United Kingdom) S Barker | 2 | 2
14 | (South Africa) R Fairbank | 6 | 6
9 | (West Germany) S Hanika | 6 | 6
(United States) B Nagelsen | 1 | 4
(Peru) P Vásquez | 1 | 3
(United States) G Fernández | 6 | 6
(United States) T Holladay | 6 | 1
(United States) S Mascarin | 7 | 6

Second round
5 | (United States) B Gadusek | 7 | 6
(Australia) A Minter | 6 | 2
(Czechoslovakia) I Budařová | 6 | 6
14 | (South Africa) R Fairbank | 4 | 2
9 | (West Germany) S Hanika | 6 | 3 | 6
(United States) G Fernández | 4 | 6 | 3
(United States) S Mascarin | 1 | 3
4 | (United States) Z Garrison | 6 | 6

Third round
5 | (United States) B Gadusek | 6 | 6
(Czechoslovakia) I Budařová | 1 | 3
9 | (West Germany) S Hanika | 7 | 5 | r
4 | (United States) Z Garrison | 6 | 7

Quarterfinals
5 | (United States) B Gadusek | 2 | 2
4 | (United States) Z Garrison | 6 | 6

==== Section 4 ====
First round
(United States) T Phelps | 6 | 3 | 6
(United States) G Kim | 0 | 6 | 3
(Austria) P Huber | 2 | 3
(United States) B Herr | 6 | 6
(United States) C Benjamin | 6 | 6
12 | (Romania) V Ruzici | 0 | 3
(South Africa) R Uys | 6 | 4
(Japan) E Inoue | 7 | 6
(Sweden) C Karlsson | 1 | 4
(United States) S Collins | 6 | 6
(United States) LA Thompson | 3 | 3
(United States) P Louie | 6 | 6

Second round
8 | (Czechoslovakia) H Suková | 6 | 4 | 6
(United States) T Phelps | 3 | 6 | 0
(United States) B Herr
(United States) C Benjamin | w/o
(Japan) E Inoue | 6 | 6
(United States) S Collins | 2 | 4
(United States) P Louie | 2 | 2
2 | (United States) P Shriver | 6 | 6

Third round
8 | (Czechoslovakia) H Suková | 6 | 3
(United States) C Benjamin | 7 | 6
(Japan) E Inoue | 6 | 1
2 | (United States) P Shriver | 7 | 6

Quarterfinals
(United States) C Benjamin | 1 | 2
2 | (United States) P Shriver | 6 | 6
