= 1985 United Jersey Bank Classic – Doubles =

Doubles
- 1985 United Jersey Bank Classic

Final
- Champions: (United States) Kathy Jordan (Australia) Elizabeth Smylie
- Runners-up: (West Germany) Claudia Kohde-Kilsch (Czechoslovakia) Helena Suková
- Score: 7–6, 6–3

Details
- Draw: 32
- Seeds: 8

Events
Singles	Doubles
← 1984 ·	WTA New Jersey	· 1986 →

Martina Navratilova and Pam Shriver were the defending champions, but none competed this year.

Kathy Jordan and Elizabeth Smylie won the title by defeating Claudia Kohde-Kilsch and Helena Suková 7–6, 6–3 in the final.

== Seeds ==
1. (West Germany) Claudia Kohde-Kilsch / (Czechoslovakia) Helena Suková (final)
2. (United States) Kathy Jordan / (Australia) Elizabeth Smylie (champions)
3. (United States) Gigi Fernández / (United States) Robin White (semifinals)
4. (South Africa) Rosalyn Fairbank / (South Africa) Beverly Mould (semifinals)
5. (Bulgaria) Katerina Maleeva / (Bulgaria) Manuela Maleeva (second round, withdrew)
6. (Netherlands) Marcella Mesker / (France) Pascale Paradis (quarterfinals)
7. (United States) Elise Burgin / (Switzerland) Christiane Jolissaint (quarterfinals)
8. (United Kingdom) Jo Durie / (West Germany) Steffi Graf (quarterfinals)

== Draw ==
=== Key ===
- Q = Qualifier
- WC = Wild card
- LL = Lucky loser
- Alt = Alternate
- ITF = ITF entry
- PR = Protected ranking
- SR = Special ranking
- SE = Special exempt
- JE = Junior exempt
- JR = Junior Accelerator Programme entrant
- CO = College Accelerator Programme entrant
- NG = Next Gen Accelerator Program entrant
- w/o = Walkover
- r = Retired
- d = Defaulted

=== Finals ===
Semifinals
1	(West Germany) Claudia Kohde-Kilsch (Czechoslovakia) Helena Suková	6	7
4	(South Africa) Rosalyn Fairbank (South Africa) Beverly Mould	3	5
3	(United States) Gigi Fernández (United States) Robin White	4	4
2	(United States) Kathy Jordan (Australia) Elizabeth Smylie	6	6

Final
1	(West Germany) Claudia Kohde-Kilsch (Czechoslovakia) Helena Suková	6	3
2	(United States) Kathy Jordan (Australia) Elizabeth Smylie	7	6

=== Top half ===
First round
1	(West Germany) C Kohde-Kilsch (Czechoslovakia) H Suková	6	7
(Socialist Federal Republic of Yugoslavia) S Goleš (Argentina) E Longo	3	6
(Italy) S Cecchini (United States) H Ludloff	3	3
(South Africa) J Mundel (South Africa) R Uys	6	6
(United States) V Nelson (West Germany) M Schropp	7	3	1
(France) I Demongeot (France) C Vanier	5	6	6
(United States) C Benjamin (United States) J Klitch	4	2
6	(Netherlands) M Mesker (France) P Paradis	6	6
4	(South Africa) R Fairbank (South Africa) B Mould	6	6
(United States) T Mochizuki (United States) Sylvia Schenck	1	1
(United States) P Barg (Brazil) N Dias	1	1
(Argentina) M Paz (Argentina) A Villagrán	6	6
(United States) P Louie (United States) K Shaefer	4	7	1
(Sweden) C Karlsson (Denmark) T Scheuer-Larsen	6	5	6
(Brazil) P Medrado (Brazil) C Monteiro	1	3
7	(United States) E Burgin (Switzerland) C Jolissaint	6	6

Second round
1	(West Germany) C Kohde-Kilsch (Czechoslovakia) H Suková	6	7
(South Africa) J Mundel (South Africa) R Uys	1	6
(France) I Demongeot (France) C Vanier	3	2
6	(Netherlands) M Mesker (France) P Paradis	6	6
4	(South Africa) R Fairbank (South Africa) B Mould	3	6	7
(Argentina) M Paz (Argentina) A Villagrán	6	1	6
(Sweden) C Karlsson (Denmark) T Scheuer-Larsen	6	3
7	(United States) E Burgin (Switzerland) C Jolissaint	7	6

Quarterfinals
1	(West Germany) C Kohde-Kilsch (Czechoslovakia) H Suková	7	7
6	(Netherlands) M Mesker (France) P Paradis	5	5
4	(South Africa) R Fairbank (South Africa) B Mould	6	7
7	(United States) E Burgin (Switzerland) C Jolissaint	2	6

Semifinals
1	(West Germany) C Kohde-Kilsch (Czechoslovakia) H Suková	6	7
4	(South Africa) R Fairbank (South Africa) B Mould	3	5

=== Bottom half ===
First round
5	(Bulgaria) K Maleeva (Bulgaria) M Maleeva	7	7
(New Zealand) B Cordwell (Australia) P Whytcross	5	5
(United States) A Jaeger (Czechoslovakia) R Maršíková	0	1
(United Kingdom) A Brown (United Kingdom) S Gomer	6	6
(France) S Amiach (United States) B Gerken	0	2
(United States) L McNeil (France) C Suire	6	6
(Sweden) C Lindqvist (United States) J Russell	4	5
3	(United States) G Fernández (United States) R White	6	7
8	(United Kingdom) J Durie (West Germany) S Graf	6	6
(Czechoslovakia) I Budařová (Czechoslovakia) M Skuherská	2	4
(United States) K Rinaldi (Argentina) G Sabatini	4	5
(United States) T Phelps (Italy) R Reggi	6	7
(Australia) A Minter (Australia) E Minter	2	6	6
(Hungary) C Bartos (Austria) P Huber	6	4	4
(United Kingdom) A Croft (United States) A Holton	1	4
2	(United States) K Jordan (Australia) E Smylie	6	6

Second round
5	(Bulgaria) K Maleeva (Bulgaria) M Maleeva
(United Kingdom) A Brown (United Kingdom) S Gomer	w/o
(United States) L McNeil (France) C Suire	6	3
3	(United States) G Fernández (United States) R White	7	6
8	(United Kingdom) J Durie (West Germany) S Graf	6	6
(United States) T Phelps (Italy) R Reggi	4	3
(Australia) A Minter (Australia) E Minter	3	1
2	(United States) K Jordan (Australia) E Smylie	6	6

Quarterfinals
(United Kingdom) A Brown (United Kingdom) S Gomer	7	3	4
3	(United States) G Fernández (United States) R White	6	6	6
8	(United Kingdom) J Durie (West Germany) S Graf	3	2
2	(United States) K Jordan (Australia) E Smylie	6	6

Semifinals
3	(United States) G Fernández (United States) R White	4	4
2	(United States) K Jordan (Australia) E Smylie	6	6
