= 1985 Virginia Slims of Chicago – Singles =

Singles
- 1985 Virginia Slims of Chicago

Final
- Champion: (United States) Bonnie Gadusek
- Runner-up: (United States) Kathy Rinaldi
- Score: 6–1, 6–3

Details
- Draw: 31 (4Q/1LL)
- Seeds: 8

Events
Singles	Doubles
← 1984 ·	Ameritech Cup	· 1986 →

Pam Shriver was the defending champion, but lost in the quarterfinals to Kathy Jordan.

Bonnie Gadusek won the title by defeating Kathy Rinaldi 6–1, 6–3 in the final.

== Seeds ==
1. (United States) Pam Shriver (quarterfinals)
2. (n/a)
3. (United States) Kathy Rinaldi (final)
4. (Australia) Wendy Turnbull (semifinals)
5. (United States) Bonnie Gadusek (champion)
6. (Canada) Carling Bassett (second round)
7. (United States) Barbara Potter (quarterfinals)
8. (United States) Kathy Jordan (semifinals)

== Draw ==
=== Key ===
- Q = Qualifier
- WC = Wild card
- LL = Lucky loser
- Alt = Alternate
- ITF = ITF entry
- PR = Protected ranking
- SR = Special ranking
- SE = Special exempt
- JE = Junior exempt
- JR = Junior Accelerator Programme entrant
- CO = College Accelerator Programme entrant
- NG = Next Gen Accelerator Program entrant
- w/o = Walkover
- r = Retired
- d = Defaulted

=== Finals ===
Semifinals
8	(United States) Kathy Jordan	0	5
3	(United States) Kathy Rinaldi	6	7
4	(Australia) Wendy Turnbull	6	2
5	(United States) Bonnie Gadusek	7	6

Final
3	(United States) Kathy Rinaldi	1	3
5	(United States) Bonnie Gadusek	6	6

=== Top half ===
First round
1	(United States) P Shriver	6	6
(United States) J Klitch	0	0
(United States) K Shaefer	7	6
(United States) A Jaeger	6	2
(United States) R White	3	6	6
(United States) P Louie	6	3	2
(Australia) D Balestrat	5	2
8	(United States) K Jordan	7	6
3	(United States) K Rinaldi	6	6
(United States) G Fernández	0	4
(United States) ML Piatek	6	6
(United States) A Ivan	3	4
(Australia) A Minter	1	3
(United States) S Mascarin	6	6
(United States) A Henricksson	2	5
6	(Canada) C Bassett	6	7

Second round
1	(United States) P Shriver	6	2	6
(United States) K Shaefer	3	6	3
(United States) R White	3	7	2
8	(United States) K Jordan	6	6	6
3	(United States) K Rinaldi	6	6
(United States) ML Piatek	1	1
(United States) S Mascarin	7	6
6	(Canada) C Bassett	6	4

Quarterfinals
1	(United States) P Shriver	2	3
8	(United States) K Jordan	6	6
3	(United States) K Rinaldi	6	6
(United States) S Mascarin	4	3

Semifinals
8	(United States) K Jordan	0	5
3	(United States) K Rinaldi	6	7

=== Bottom half ===
First round
7	(United States) B Potter	6	6
LL	(United States) P Fendick	3	2
(United States) J Russell	6	6
Q	(Soviet Union) E Eliseenko	2	2
(United States) M Torres	0	6	3
(United States) K Gompert	6	4	6
(United States) K Horvath	3	0
4	(Australia) W Turnbull	6	6
5	(United States) B Gadusek	3	6	6
Q	(Australia) J Tremelling	6	3	4
Q	(United States) G Kim	6	6	6
(United States) A Moulton	4	7	3
(United States) L Antonoplis	6	3	5
Q	(United States) K Kinney	4	6	7

Second round
7	(United States) B Potter	7	7
(United States) J Russell	6	6
(United States) K Gompert	4	3
4	(Australia) W Turnbull	6	6
5	(United States) B Gadusek	6	6	6
Q	(United States) G Kim	2	7	4
Q	(United States) K Kinney	2	0
(United States) E Burgin	6	6

Quarterfinals
7	(United States) B Potter	1	7	3
4	(Australia) W Turnbull	6	6	6
5	(United States) B Gadusek	6	7
(United States) E Burgin	4	6

Semifinals
4	(Australia) W Turnbull	6	2
5	(United States) B Gadusek	7	6
