= 1984 United Jersey Bank Classic – Doubles =

Doubles
- 1984 United Jersey Bank Classic

Final
- Champions: (United States) Martina Navratilova (United States) Pam Shriver
- Runners-up: (United Kingdom) Jo Durie (United States) Ann Kiyomura
- Score: 7–6^{(7–3)}, 3–6, 6–2

Details
- Draw: 32
- Seeds: 8

Events
Singles	Doubles
- WTA New Jersey

Jo Durie and Sharon Walsh were the defending champions, but Walsh did not compete this year.

Durie teamed up with Ann Kiyomura and lost in the final to Martina Navratilova and Pam Shriver. The score was 7–6^{(7–3)}, 3–6, 6–2.

== Seeds ==
1. (United States) Martina Navratilova / (United States) Pam Shriver (champions)
2. (United Kingdom) Jo Durie / (United States) Ann Kiyomura (final)
3. (South Africa) Rosalyn Fairbank / (United States) Barbara Potter (semifinals)
4. (West Germany) Claudia Kohde-Kilsch / (Czechoslovakia) Hana Mandlíková (quarterfinals)
5. (United Kingdom) Anne Hobbs / (Australia) Elizabeth Sayers (first round)
6. (Switzerland) Christiane Jolissaint / (Netherlands) Marcella Mesker (quarterfinals)
7. (United States) Sandy Collins / (Czechoslovakia) Helena Suková (quarterfinals)
8. (United States) Betsy Nagelsen / (Romania) Virginia Ruzici (semifinals)

== Draw ==
Key

- Q = Qualifier
- WC = Wild card
- LL = Lucky loser
- Alt = Alternate
- ITF = ITF entry
- PR = Protected ranking
- SR = Special ranking
- SE = Special exempt
- JE = Junior exempt
- JR = Junior Accelerator Programme entrant
- CO = College Accelerator Programme entrant
- NG = Next Gen Accelerator Program entrant
- w/o = Walkover
- r = Retired
- d = Defaulted

=== Finals ===
Semifinals
1	(United States) Martina Navratilova (United States) Pam Shriver	6	7
3	(South Africa) Rosalyn Fairbank (United States) Barbara Potter	1	6
8	(United States) Betsy Nagelsen (Romania) Virginia Ruzici	3	6
2	(United Kingdom) Jo Durie (United States) Ann Kiyomura	6	7

Final
1	(United States) Martina Navratilova (United States) Pam Shriver	7^{7}	3	6
2	(United Kingdom) Jo Durie (United States) Ann Kiyomura	6^{3}	6	2

=== Top half ===
First round
1	(United States) M Navratilova (United States) P Shriver	6	6
(United Kingdom) S Barker (United States) J Newberry	1	2
(United States) A Henricksson (United States) R White	6	7
(Switzerland) P Delhees (France) P Paradis	2	5
(Canada) J Hetherington (Canada) H Pelletier	6	6
(United States) K Copeland (United States) L Forood	3	2
(United States) L McNeil (United States) G Rush	3	6
7	(United States) S Collins (Czechoslovakia) H Suková	6	7
3	(South Africa) R Fairbank (United States) B Potter	6	6
(Czechoslovakia) Y Brzáková (Sweden) C Jexell	1	2
(France) S Amiach (United States) AM Fernandez	6	6
(South Africa) R Uys (Peru) P Vásquez	3	1
(United States) T Holladay (Poland) I Kuczyńska	6	5	2
(United States) G Fernández (United States) K Sands	1	7	6
(United States) S Mascarin (United States) K Rinaldi	3	2
6	(Switzerland) C Jolissaint (Netherlands) M Mesker	6	6

Second round
1	(United States) M Navratilova (United States) P Shriver	6	6
(United States) A Henricksson (United States) R White	2	4
(Canada) J Hetherington (Canada) H Pelletier	1	4
7	(United States) S Collins (Czechoslovakia) H Suková	6	6
3	(South Africa) R Fairbank (United States) B Potter	6	6
(France) S Amiach (United States) AM Fernandez	1	4
(United States) G Fernández (United States) K Sands	1	3
6	(Switzerland) C Jolissaint (Netherlands) M Mesker	6	6

Quarterfinals
1	(United States) M Navratilova (United States) P Shriver	6	6
7	(United States) S Collins (Czechoslovakia) H Suková	1	2
3	(South Africa) R Fairbank (United States) B Potter	4	6	6
6	(Switzerland) C Jolissaint (Netherlands) M Mesker	6	1	4

Semifinals
1	(United States) M Navratilova (United States) P Shriver	6	7
3	(South Africa) R Fairbank (United States) B Potter	1	6

=== Bottom half ===
First round
8	(United States) B Nagelsen (Romania) V Ruzici	7	6
(Czechoslovakia) I Budařová (Czechoslovakia) M Skuherská	5	2
(United States) L Antonoplis (South Africa) B Mould	6	2	5
(France) C Suire (Australia) P Whytcross	3	6	7
(Czechoslovakia) K Skronská (France) C Vanier	4	2
(Australia) A Minter (Australia) E Minter	6	6
(South Africa) J Mundel (United States) F Raschiatore	4	5
4	(West Germany) C Kohde-Kilsch (Czechoslovakia) H Mandlíková	6	7
5	(United Kingdom) A Hobbs (Australia) E Sayers	7	6	3
(United States) P Louie (United States) H Ludloff	6	7	6
(South Africa) I Kloss (United States) P Teeguarden	7	6
(Peru) L Arraya (Socialist Federal Republic of Yugoslavia) S Goleš	6	0
(West Germany) S Graf (United States) T Phelps	4	7	6
(United States) C Benjamin (United States) Z Garrison	6	6	4
(United States) E Burgin (United States) ML Piatek	3	0
2	(United Kingdom) J Durie (United States) A Kiyomura	6	6

Second round
8	(United States) B Nagelsen (Romania) V Ruzici	6	5	6
(France) C Suire (Australia) P Whytcross	3	7	2
(Australia) A Minter (Australia) E Minter	6	1	3
4	(West Germany) C Kohde-Kilsch (Czechoslovakia) H Mandlíková	4	6	6
(United States) P Louie (United States) H Ludloff	6	6
(South Africa) I Kloss (United States) P Teeguarden	3	3
(West Germany) S Graf (United States) T Phelps	4	3
2	(United Kingdom) J Durie (United States) A Kiyomura	6	6

Quarterfinals
8	(United States) B Nagelsen (Romania) V Ruzici	6	6
4	(West Germany) C Kohde-Kilsch (Czechoslovakia) H Mandlíková	3	2
(United States) P Louie (United States) H Ludloff	2	2
2	(United Kingdom) J Durie (United States) A Kiyomura	6	6

Semifinals
8	(United States) B Nagelsen (Romania) V Ruzici	3	6
2	(United Kingdom) J Durie (United States) A Kiyomura	6	7
