= 1985 Virginia Slims of Chicago – Doubles =

Doubles
- 1985 Virginia Slims of Chicago

Final
- Champions: (United States) Kathy Jordan (Australia) Elizabeth Smylie
- Runners-up: (United States) Elise Burgin (United States) JoAnne Russell
- Score: 6–2, 6–2

Details
- Draw: 16
- Seeds: 4

Events
Singles	Doubles
← 1984 ·	Ameritech Cup	· 1986 →

Billie Jean King and Sharon Walsh-Pete were the defending champions, but King did not compete this year. Walsh-Pete teamed up with Barbara Potter and lost in the semifinals to Elise Burgin and JoAnne Russell

Kathy Jordan and Elizabeth Smylie won the title by defeating Burgin and Russell 6–2, 6–2 in the final.

== Seeds ==
1. (United States) Kathy Jordan / (Australia) Elizabeth Smylie (champions)
2. (Czechoslovakia) Hana Mandlíková / (Australia) Wendy Turnbull (quarterfinals, withdrew)
3. (United States) Barbara Potter / (United States) Sharon Walsh-Pete (semifinals)
4. (Soviet Union) Svetlana Cherneva / (Soviet Union) Larisa Savchenko (semifinals)

== Draw ==
=== Key ===
- Q = Qualifier
- WC = Wild card
- LL = Lucky loser
- Alt = Alternate
- ITF = ITF entry
- PR = Protected ranking
- SR = Special ranking
- SE = Special exempt
- JE = Junior exempt
- JR = Junior Accelerator Programme entrant
- CO = College Accelerator Programme entrant
- NG = Next Gen Accelerator Program entrant
- w/o = Walkover
- r = Retired
- d = Defaulted

=== Draw ===
First round
1	(United States) K Jordan (Australia) E Smylie	6	6
(United States) C Reynolds (United States) P Smith	1	3
(United States) L McNeil (United States) K Sands	4	7	6
(Australia) A Minter (Australia) E Minter	6	5	2
4	(Soviet Union) S Cherneva (Soviet Union) L Savchenko	6	4	6
(South Africa) J Mundel (South Africa) Y Vermaak	1	6	2
(United States) K Horvath (United States) A Jaeger	w/o
(Canada) C Bassett (United States) K Rinaldi
(United States) G Fernández (United States) R White	6	6
(United States) B Gadusek (United States) A Henricksson	4	4
(United States) A Moulton (United States) ML Piatek	3	2
3	(United States) B Potter (United States) S Walsh-Pete	6	6
(United States) E Burgin (United States) J Russell	3	6	6
(United States) L Antonoplis (United States) L Gates	6	3	4
(United States) P Barg (United States) S Collins	3	0
2	(Czechoslovakia) H Mandlíková (Australia) W Turnbull	6	6

Quarterfinals
1	(United States) K Jordan (Australia) E Smylie	6	7
(United States) L McNeil (United States) K Sands	4	6
4	(Soviet Union) S Cherneva (Soviet Union) L Savchenko	6	6
(United States) K Horvath (United States) A Jaeger	1	1
(United States) G Fernández (United States) R White	6	4	4
3	(United States) B Potter (United States) S Walsh-Pete	2	6	6
(United States) E Burgin (United States) J Russell	w/o
2	(Czechoslovakia) H Mandlíková (Australia) W Turnbull

Semifinals
1	(United States) K Jordan (Australia) E Smylie	6	6	6
4	(Soviet Union) S Cherneva (Soviet Union) L Savchenko	7	2	3
3	(United States) B Potter (United States) S Walsh-Pete	6	2
(United States) E Burgin (United States) J Russell	7	6

Final
1	(United States) K Jordan (Australia) E Smylie	6	6
(United States) E Burgin (United States) J Russell	2	2
