= 1986 Virginia Slims of Pennsylvania =

- Date: March 3 – 9
- Edition: 4th
- Draw: 32S / 16D
- Prize money: $75,000
- Surface: Carpet / indoor
- Location: Hershey, PA, U.S.
- Venue: Hershey Racquet Club

Champions

Singles
- (Australia) Janine Thompson

Doubles
- (United States) Candy Reynolds / (United States) Anne Smith
← 1985 ·	Virginia Slims of Pennsylvania

The 1986 Virginia Slims of Pennsylvania, also known as the VS of Pennsylvania, was a women's tennis tournament played on indoor carpet courts at the Hershey Racquet Club in Hershey, Pennsylvania in the United States that was part of the 1985 Virginia Slims World Championship Series. It was the fourth and last edition of the event and was played from March 3 through March 9, 1986. Unseeded Janine Thompson won the singles title.

== Finals ==
=== Singles ===
(Australia) Janine Thompson defeated (France) Catherine Suire 6–1, 6–4

=== Doubles ===
(United States) Candy Reynolds / (United States) Anne Smith defeated (United States) Sandy Collins / (United States) Kim Sands 7–6, 6–1
