= 1985 United Jersey Bank Classic – Singles =

Singles
- 1985 United Jersey Bank Classic

Final
- Champion: (United States) Kathy Rinaldi
- Runner-up: (West Germany) Steffi Graf
- Score: 6–4, 3–6, 6–4

Details
- Draw: 56 (7Q/1LL)
- Seeds: 14

Events
Singles	Doubles
← 1984 ·	WTA New Jersey	· 1986 →

Martina Navratilova was the defending champion, but did not compete this year.

Kathy Rinaldi won the title by defeating Steffi Graf 6–4, 3–6, 6–4 in the final.

== Seeds ==
The first nine seeds received a bye to the second round.

1. (United States) Pam Shriver (quarterfinals)
2. (Bulgaria) Manuela Maleeva (third round, retired)
3. (n/a)
4. (Czechoslovakia) Helena Suková (quarterfinals)
5. (Germany) Steffi Graf (final)
6. (United States) Kathy Rinaldi (champion)
7. (Argentina) Gabriela Sabatini (semifinals)
8. (Sweden) Catarina Lindqvist (semifinals)
9. (United States) Kathy Jordan (quarterfinals)
10. (n/a)
11. (n/a)
12. (United States) Pam Casale (third round)
13. (United States) Elise Burgin (first round)
14. (Bulgaria) Katerina Maleeva (third round)

== Draw ==
=== Key ===
- Q = Qualifier
- WC = Wild card
- LL = Lucky loser
- Alt = Alternate
- ITF = ITF entry
- PR = Protected ranking
- SR = Special ranking
- SE = Special exempt
- JE = Junior exempt
- JR = Junior Accelerator Programme entrant
- CO = College Accelerator Programme entrant
- NG = Next Gen Accelerator Program entrant
- w/o = Walkover
- r = Retired
- d = Defaulted

=== Finals ===
Quarterfinals
1	(United States) Pam Shriver	4	5
7	(Argentina) Gabriela Sabatini	6	7
5	(West Germany) Steffi Graf	6	6
9	(United States) Kathy Jordan	4	4
8	(Sweden) Catarina Lindqvist	6	6
4	(Czechoslovakia) Helena Suková	1	2
6	(United States) Kathy Rinaldi	6	6
(Czechoslovakia) Iva Budařová	2	4

Semifinals
7	(Argentina) Gabriela Sabatini	6	0	3
5	(West Germany) Steffi Graf	4	6	6
8	(Sweden) Catarina Lindqvist	7	2	1
6	(United States) Kathy Rinaldi	5	6	6

Final
5	(West Germany) Steffi Graf	4	6	4
6	(United States) Kathy Rinaldi	6	3	6

=== Top half ===
==== Section 1 ====
First round
(Czechoslovakia) R Maršíková	3	2
(South Africa) R Fairbank	6	6
(Australia) A Minter	6	7
(Austria) P Huber	4	6
(United Kingdom) S Gomer	6	5	5
LL	(Canada) H Kelesi	4	7	7
(United States) G Fernández	2	1
(Switzerland) C Jolissaint	6	6
Q	(United States) E Tell	4	4
(Japan) M Yanagi	6	6
(United States) K Schaefer	6	6	4
Q	(Australia) E Minter	7	2	6

Second round
1	(United States) P Shriver	6	7
(South Africa) R Fairbank	4	6
(Australia) A Minter	6	4	3
LL	(Canada) H Kelesi	1	6	6
(Switzerland) C Jolissaint	6	3	6
(Japan) M Yanagi	4	6	2
Q	(Australia) E Minter	3	2
7	(Argentina) G Sabatini	6	6

Third round
1	(United States) P Shriver	6	6
LL	(Canada) H Kelesi	3	4
(Switzerland) C Jolissaint	3	1
7	(Argentina) G Sabatini	6	6

Quarterfinals
1	(United States) P Shriver	4	5
7	(Argentina) G Sabatini	6	7

==== Section 2 ====
First round
Q	(Argentina) E Longo	2	6	6
Q	(United Kingdom) A Brown	6	4	7
(United States) L McNeil	6	7
(Australia) E Smylie	1	5
(Denmark) T Scheuer-Larsen	4	5
14	(Bulgaria) K Maleeva	6	7
(United States) P Louie	1	1
(United Kingdom) J Durie	6	6
(United States) A Jaeger	6	6
Q	(France) MC Calleja	3	4
(United States) J Russell	3	6	5
(Socialist Federal Republic of Yugoslavia) S Goleš	6	3	7

Second round
5	(West Germany) S Graf	6	6
Q	(United Kingdom) A Brown	1	1
(United States) L McNeil	4	2
14	(Bulgaria) K Maleeva	6	6
(United Kingdom) J Durie	2	r
(United States) A Jaeger	6
(Socialist Federal Republic of Yugoslavia) S Goleš	3	0
9	(United States) K Jordan	6	6

Third round
5	(West Germany) S Graf	6	6
14	(Bulgaria) K Maleeva	2	0
(United States) A Jaeger	6	6	1
9	(United States) K Jordan	4	7	6

Quarterfinals
5	(West Germany) S Graf	6	6
9	(United States) K Jordan	4	4

=== Bottom half ===
==== Section 3 ====
First round
(Italy) S Cecchini	1	6	4
(United Kingdom) A Croft	6	4	6
(Italy) R Reggi	1	6	6
Q	(United States) LA Thompson	6	4	7
(Netherlands) M Mesker	6	6
13	(United States) E Burgin	1	2
(West Germany) S Hanika	6	6
(West Germany) M Schropp	1	4
(United States) T Phelps	7	6
(United States) V Nelson	6	3
(South Africa) B Mould	6	4
(Argentina) A Villagrán	7	6

Second round
8	(Sweden) C Lindqvist	6	6
(United Kingdom) A Croft	3	4
Q	(United States) LA Thompson	6	6
(Netherlands) M Mesker	1	1
(West Germany) S Hanika	6	1	6
(United States) T Phelps	4	6	3
(Argentina) A Villagrán	4	1
4	(Czechoslovakia) H Suková	6	6

Third round
8	(Sweden) C Lindqvist	6	6
Q	(United States) LA Thompson	3	2
(West Germany) S Hanika	3	3
4	(Czechoslovakia) H Suková	6	6

Quarterfinals
8	(Sweden) C Lindqvist	6	6
4	(Czechoslovakia) H Suková	1	2

==== Section 4 ====
First round
(United States) C Benjamin	3	2
Q	(New Zealand) B Cordwell	6	6
(United States) R White	3	1
(France) P Paradis	6	6
(United States) J Klitch	1	1
12	(United States) P Casale	6	6
(Soviet Union) L Savchenko	4	6	7
(Sweden) C Karlsson	6	2	5
(United States) G Kim	2	2
(Czechoslovakia) I Budařová	6	6
(Japan) E Inoue	6	6
(United States) B Gerken	1	3

Second round
6	(United States) K Rinaldi	7	6
Q	(New Zealand) B Cordwell	6	2
(France) P Paradis	6	3	1
12	(United States) P Casale	3	6	6
(Soviet Union) L Savchenko	4	6	3
(Czechoslovakia) I Budařová	6	3	6
(Japan) E Inoue	2	5
2	(Bulgaria) M Maleeva	6	7

Third round
6	(United States) K Rinaldi	6	6
12	(United States) P Casale	3	2
(Czechoslovakia) I Budařová	1	6	3
2	(Bulgaria) M Maleeva	6	3	0^{r}

Quarterfinals
6	(United States) K Rinaldi	6	6
(Czechoslovakia) I Budařová	2	4
