= 1985 United Jersey Bank Classic =

- Date: August 12–18
- Edition: 8th
- Category: 3
- Draw: 56S / 32D
- Prize money: $150,000
- Surface: Hard / outdoor
- Location: Mahwah, New Jersey, U.S.
- Venue: Ramapo College

Champions

Singles
- (United States) Kathy Rinaldi

Doubles
- (United States) Kathy Jordan / (Australia) Elizabeth Smylie
← 1984 ·	WTA New Jersey	· 1986 →

The 1985 United Jersey Bank Classic was a women's tennis tournament played on outdoor hard courts at the Ramapo College in Mahwah, New Jersey in the United States that was part of the Category 3 tier of the 1985 Virginia Slims World Championship Series. It was the eighth edition of the tournament and was held from August 12 through August 18, 1985. A crowd of 4,083 spectators watched sixth-seeded Kathy Rinaldi win the singles title and earn $26,000 first-prize money.

== Finals ==
=== Singles ===
(United States) Kathy Rinaldi defeated (West Germany) Steffi Graf 6–4, 3–6, 6–4

=== Doubles ===
(United States) Kathy Jordan / (Australia) Elizabeth Smylie defeated (West Germany) Claudia Kohde-Kilsch / (Czechoslovakia) Helena Suková 7–6, 6–3
