= 1985 Hewlett-Packard Trophy =

- Date: 4–10 November
- Edition: 1st
- Draw: 16S / 13D
- Prize money: $75,000
- Surface: Carpet / indoor
- Location: Hilversum, Netherlands

Champions

Singles
- (Bulgaria) Katerina Maleeva

Doubles
- (Netherlands) Marcella Mesker / (France) Catherine Tanvier
- Hewlett-Packard Trophy

The 1985 Hewlett-Packard Trophy was a women's tennis tournament played on indoor carpet courts in Hilversum, Netherlands. It was part of the 1985 Virginia Slims World Championship Series and was played from 4 November until 10 November 1985. Unseeded Katerina Maleeva won the singles title.

== Finals ==
=== Singles ===
(Bulgaria) Katerina Maleeva defeated (Sweden) Carina Karlsson 6–3, 6–2

- It was Maleeva's 2nd singles title of the year and of her career.

=== Doubles ===
(Netherlands) Marcella Mesker / (France) Catherine Tanvier defeated (Italy) Sandra Cecchini / (Socialist Federal Republic of Yugoslavia) Sabrina Goleš 6–2, 6–2
