= 1985 Lynda Carter Maybelline Classic =

- Date: September 30 – October 6
- Edition: 6th
- Draw: 32S / 16D
- Prize money: $150,000
- Surface: Hard / outdoor
- Location: Fort Lauderdale, Florida, U.S.
- Venue: Bonaventure Racquet Club

Champions

Singles
- (United States) Martina Navratilova

Doubles
- (United States) Gigi Fernández / (United States) Robin White
← 1984 ·	Maybelline Classic

The 1985 Maybelline Classic was a women's tennis tournament played on outdoor hard courts at the Bonaventure Racquet Club in Fort Lauderdale, Florida in the United States that was part of the 1985 Virginia Slims World Championship Series. It was the sixth and last edition of the tournament and was held from September 30 through October 6, 1985. First-seeded Martina Navratilova won her second consecutive singles title at the event.

== Finals ==
=== Singles ===
(United States) Martina Navratilova defeated (West Germany) Steffi Graf 6–3, 6–1

- It was Navratilova's 9th singles title of the year and the 108th of her career.

=== Doubles ===
(United States) Gigi Fernández / (United States) Robin White defeated (South Africa) Rosalyn Fairbank / (South Africa) Beverly Mould 6–2, 7–5

- It was Fernández' 4th doubles title of the year and of her career. It was White's 2nd doubles title of the year and of her career.
