= 1985 European Indoors =

Women's tennis tournament

- Date: 28 October – 3 November
- Edition: 2nd
- Draw: 32S / 16D
- Prize money: $150,000
- Surface: Carpet / indoor
- Location: Zürich, Switzerland
- Venue: Saalsporthalle Allmend

Champions

Singles
- (United States) Zina Garrison

Doubles
- (Czechoslovakia) Hana Mandlíková (Hungary) Andrea Temesvári
| ← 1984 · | Zurich Open | · 1986 → |

The 1985 European Indoors was a women's tennis tournament played on indoor carpet courts at the Saalsporthalle Allmend in Zürich, Switzerland that was part of the 1985 Virginia Slims World Championship Series. It was the second edition of the tournament and was held from 28 October through 3 November 1985. Third-seeded Zina Garrison won her second consecutive singles title at the event.

== Finals ==
=== Singles ===
(United States) Zina Garrison defeated (Czechoslovakia) Hana Mandlíková 6–1, 6–3

- It was Garrison's 2nd singles title of the year and the 3rd of her career

=== Doubles ===
(Czechoslovakia) Hana Mandlíková / (Hungary) Andrea Temesvári defeated (West Germany) Claudia Kohde-Kilsch / (Czechoslovakia) Helena Suková 6–4, 3–6, 7–5
