= 1985 New South Wales Open =

1985 NSW Open
- Date: 9–15 December (men); 18–24 November (women)
- Edition: 94th
- Draw: 56S / 32D
- Prize money: $125,000 (men) $150,000 (women)
- Surface: Grass
- Location: Sydney, Australia
- Venue: White City Stadium

Champions

Men's singles
- (France) Henri Leconte

Women's singles
- (United States) Martina Navratilova

Men's doubles
- (United States) David Dowlen / (Nigeria) Nduka Odizor

Women's doubles
- (Czechoslovakia) Hana Mandlíková / (Australia) Wendy Turnbull
- Sydney International

The 1985 New South Wales Open was a combined men's and women's tennis tournament played on outdoor grass courts at the White City Stadium in Sydney, Australia. The men's tournament, named Alberto New South Wales Men's Open, was part of the 1985 Nabisco Grand Prix and held from 9 December until 15 December 1985. The women's tournament, known as the Family Circle NSW Open, was part of the 1985 Virginia Slims World Championship Series and was played from 18 November through 24 November 1985. It was the 94th edition of the tournament. Henri Leconte and Martina Navratilova won the singles titles.

== Finals ==
=== Men's singles ===
(France) Henri Leconte defeated (New Zealand) Kelly Evernden 6–7^{(6–8)}, 6–2, 6–3

- It was Leconte's 2nd and last singles title of the year and the 4th of his career.

=== Women's singles ===
(United States) Martina Navratilova defeated (Czechoslovakia) Hana Mandlíková 3–6, 6–1, 6–3

- It was Navratilova's 11th singles title of the year and the 110th of her career.

=== Men's doubles ===
(United States) David Dowlen / (Nigeria) Nduka Odizor defeated (Australia) Broderick Dyke / (Australia) Wally Masur 6–4, 7–6

- It was Dowlen 's only doubles title of the year and the 4th and last of his career. It was Järryd's only doubles title of the year and the 5th of his career.

=== Women's doubles ===
(Czechoslovakia) Hana Mandlíková / (Australia) Wendy Turnbull defeated (South Africa) Rosalyn Fairbank / (United States) Candy Reynolds 3–6, 7–6, 6–4

- It was Mandlíková' 5th and last doubles title of the year and the 12th of her career. It was Turnbull's 5th and last doubles title of the year and the 48th of her career.
