= 1985 Virginia Slims of Chicago =

- Date: September 16–22
- Edition: 14th
- Category: 3
- Draw: 31S / 16D
- Prize money: $150,000
- Surface: Carpet (Supreme) / indoor
- Location: Chicago, Illinois, U.S.
- Venue: UIC Pavilion

Champions

Singles
- (United States) Bonnie Gadusek

Doubles
- (United States) Kathy Jordan (Australia) Elizabeth Smylie
← 1984 ·	Virginia Slims of Chicago	· 1986 →

The 1985 Virginia Slims of Chicago was a women's tennis tournament played on indoor carpet courts at the UIC Pavilion in Chicago, Illinois in the United States and was part of the Category 3 tier of the 1985 WTA Tour. It was the 14th edition of the tournament and was held from September 16 through September 22, 1985. Fifth-seeded Bonnie Gadusek won the singles title and earned $27,000 first-prize money.

== Finals ==
=== Singles ===
(United States) Bonnie Gadusek defeated (United States) Kathy Rinaldi 6–1, 6–3

- It was Gadusek's 3rd singles title of the year and the 4th of her career.

=== Doubles ===
(United States) Kathy Jordan / (Australia) Elizabeth Smylie defeated (United States) Elise Burgin / (United States) JoAnne Russell 6–2, 6–2
