= 1985 Hewlett-Packard Trophy – Doubles =

Doubles
- 1985 Hewlett-Packard Trophy

Final
- Champions: (Netherlands) Marcella Mesker (France) Catherine Tanvier
- Runners-up: (Italy) Sandra Cecchini (Socialist Federal Republic of Yugoslavia) Sabrina Goleš
- Score: 6–2, 6–2

Details
- Draw: 13 (1WC/1Q)
- Seeds: 4

Events
Singles	Doubles
- Hilversum Trophy

In the inaugural edition of the tournament, Marcella Mesker and Catherine Tanvier won the title by defeating Sandra Cecchini and Sabrina Goleš 6–2, 6–2 in the final.

== Seeds ==
The first three seeds received a bye to the quarterfinals.

1. (Netherlands) Marcella Mesker / (France) Catherine Tanvier (champions)
2. (United States) Zina Garrison / (United States) Lori McNeil (quarterfinals)
3. (Sweden) Carina Karlsson / (Denmark) Tine Scheuer-Larsen (semifinals)
4. (France) Isabelle Demongeot / (France) Nathalie Tauziat (semifinals)

== Draw ==
Key

- Q = Qualifier
- WC = Wild card
- LL = Lucky loser
- Alt = Alternate
- ITF = ITF entry
- PR = Protected ranking
- SR = Special ranking
- SE = Special exempt
- JE = Junior exempt
- JR = Junior Accelerator Programme entrant
- CO = College Accelerator Programme entrant
- NG = Next Gen Accelerator Program entrant
- w/o = Walkover
- r = Retired
- d = Defaulted

=== Draw ===
First round
(Netherlands) C Bakkum (Netherlands) M Bollegraf	6	6
(West Germany) G Groell-Dinu (West Germany) R Tomanová	2	2
4	(France) I Demongeot (France) N Tauziat	7	6
(Bulgaria) K Maleeva (West Germany) Dagmar Schäfer	5	4
(United States) J Golder (United States) K Steinmetz	6	4	6
(Czechoslovakia) Y Brzáková (Czechoslovakia) O Votavová	2	6	2
(Austria) P Huber (West Germany) P Feucht	4	7	6
(Netherlands) H ter Riet (Netherlands) H Witvoet	6	5	3
(Italy) L Garrone (France) N Herreman	6	6	1
(Italy) S Cecchini (Socialist Federal Republic of Yugoslavia) S Goleš	3	7	6

Quarterfinals
1	(Netherlands) M Mesker (France) C Tanvier	7	6
(Netherlands) C Bakkum (Netherlands) M Bollegraf	5	1
4	(France) I Demongeot (France) N Tauziat	6	6
(United States) J Golder (United States) K Steinmetz	2	3
(Austria) P Huber (West Germany) P Feucht	1	3
3	(Sweden) C Karlsson (Denmark) T Scheuer-Larsen	6	6
(Italy) S Cecchini (Socialist Federal Republic of Yugoslavia) S Goleš	4	6	6
2	(United States) Z Garrison (United States) L McNeil	6	3	2

Semifinals
1	(Netherlands) M Mesker (France) C Tanvier	6	6
4	(France) I Demongeot (France) N Tauziat	3	4
3	(Sweden) C Karlsson (Denmark) T Scheuer-Larsen	3	4
(Italy) S Cecchini (Socialist Federal Republic of Yugoslavia) S Goleš	6	6

Final
1	(Netherlands) M Mesker (France) C Tanvier	6	6
(Italy) S Cecchini (Socialist Federal Republic of Yugoslavia) S Goleš	2	2
