= 1984 European Indoors =

- Date: 29 October – 4 November
- Edition: 1st
- Draw: 32S / 16D
- Prize money: $150,000
- Surface: Carpet / indoor
- Location: Zurich, Switzerland
- Venue: Saalsporthalle Allmend

Champions

Singles
- (United States) Zina Garrison

Doubles
- (United States) Andrea Leand / (Hungary) Andrea Temesvári
Zurich Open	· 1985 →

The 1984 European Indoors was a women's tennis tournament played on indoor carpet courts at the Saalsporthalle Allmend in Zurich, Switzerland that was part of the 1984 Virginia Slims World Championship Series. The tournament was held from 29 October through 4 November 1984. Third-seeded Zina Garrison won the singles title.

== Finals ==
=== Singles ===
(United States) Zina Garrison defeated (West Germany) Claudia Kohde-Kilsch 6–1, 0–6, 6–2

- It was Garrison's only singles title of the year and the 1st of her career.

=== Doubles ===
(United States) Andrea Leand / (Hungary) Andrea Temesvári defeated (West Germany) Claudia Kohde-Kilsch / (Czechoslovakia) Hana Mandlíková 6–1, 6–3

- It was Leand's 2nd title of the year and of her career. It was Temesvári's only title of the year and the 4th of her career.
