= 1985 Hewlett-Packard Trophy – Singles =

Singles
- 1985 Hewlett-Packard Trophy

Final
- Champion: (Bulgaria) Katerina Maleeva
- Runner-up: (Sweden) Carina Karlsson
- Score: 6–3, 6–2

Details
- Draw: 16 (2Q)
- Seeds: 4

Events
Singles	Doubles
- Hilversum Trophy

In the inaugural edition of the tournament, Katerina Maleeva won the title by defeating Carina Karlsson 6–3, 6–2 in the final.

== Seeds ==
1. (United States) Zina Garrison (semifinals)
2. (West Germany) Bettina Bunge (first round)
3. (Romania) Virginia Ruzici (quarterfinals)
4. (Italy) Sandra Cecchini (first round)

== Draw ==
Key

- Q = Qualifier
- WC = Wild card
- LL = Lucky loser
- Alt = Alternate
- ITF = ITF entry
- PR = Protected ranking
- SR = Special ranking
- SE = Special exempt
- JE = Junior exempt
- JR = Junior Accelerator Programme entrant
- CO = College Accelerator Programme entrant
- NG = Next Gen Accelerator Program entrant
- w/o = Walkover
- r = Retired
- d = Defaulted

=== Draw ===
First round
1	(United States) Z Garrison	6	6	6
(United States) K Shaefer	1	7	0
Q	(Netherlands) C Bakkum	2	2
Q	(France) N Herreman	6	6
3	(Romania) V Ruzici	6	6
(West Germany) P Keppeler	2	4
(Bulgaria) K Maleeva	6	6
(Socialist Federal Republic of Yugoslavia) S Goleš	4	4
(Netherlands) M Mesker	4	6	3
(Austria) P Huber	6	4	6
(Denmark) T Scheuer-Larsen	6	6
4	(Italy) S Cecchini	4	1
(Sweden) C Karlsson	6	6
(Italy) L Garrone	2	4
(France) C Tanvier	6	6
2	(West Germany) B Bunge	4	3

Quarterfinals
1	(United States) Z Garrison	6	6
Q	(France) N Herreman	0	2
3	(Romania) V Ruzici	5	5
(Bulgaria) K Maleeva	7	7
(Austria) P Huber	3	1
(Denmark) T Scheuer-Larsen	6	6
(Sweden) C Karlsson	6	6
(France) C Tanvier	3	4

Semifinals
1	(United States) Z Garrison	3	2
(Bulgaria) K Maleeva	6	6
(Denmark) T Scheuer-Larsen	6	0^{r}
(Sweden) C Karlsson	3	3

Final
(Bulgaria) K Maleeva	6	6
(Sweden) C Karlsson	3	2
