= Hilversum Trophy =

Defunct tennis tournament
- Event name: Hewlett-Packard Trophy
- Tour: WTA Tour (1985–86)
- Founded: 1985
- Abolished: 1986
- Editions: 2
- Location: Hilversum, Netherlands
- Venue: ‘t Melkhuisje
- Surface: Carpet (1985–86)

The Hilversum Trophy, also known as the Hewlett-Packard Trophy, was a women's tennis tournament played in Hilversum, Netherlands, in 1985 and 1986. The first event was held from 4 November 1985 – 11 November 1985; and the second from 29 September 1986 – 5 October 1986.

The tournament was played on indoor carpet and winners garnered a prize fund of $75,000.

== Champions ==
=== Singles ===
Year	Champions	Runners-up	Score
1985	(Bulgaria) Katerina Maleeva	(Sweden) Carina Karlsson	6–3, 6–2
1986	(Czechoslovakia) Helena Suková	(France) Catherine Tanvier	6–2, 7–5

=== Doubles ===
Year	Champions	Runners-up	Score
1985	(Netherlands) Marcella Mesker (France) Catherine Tanvier	(Italy) Sandra Cecchini (Socialist Federal Republic of Yugoslavia) Sabrina Goleš	6–2, 6–2
1986	(United States) Kathy Jordan (Czechoslovakia) Helena Suková	(Denmark) Tine Scheuer-Larsen (France) Catherine Tanvier	6–3, 3–6, 6–4

== See also ==
- Dutch Open
