= 1985 Virginia Slims of Pennsylvania =

- Date: February 25 – March 3
- Edition: 3rd
- Draw: 32S / 16D
- Prize money: $75,000
- Surface: Carpet / indoor
- Location: Hershey, PA, U.S.
- Venue: Hershey Racquet Club

Champions

Singles
- (United States) Robin White

Doubles
- (United States) Mary Lou Piatek / (United States) Robin White
← 1984 ·	Virginia Slims of Pennsylvania	· 1986 →

The 1985 Virginia Slims of Pennsylvania, also known as the VS of Pennsylvania, was a women's tennis tournament played on indoor carpet courts at the Hershey Racquet Club in Hershey, Pennsylvania in the United States. It was the third edition of the tournament, which was part of the 1984 Virginia Slims World Championship Series, (Note: The 1984 Virginia Slims World Championship Series ran from March 1984 through March 1985.) and was played from February 25 through March 3, 1985. Unseeded Robin White won the singles title.

== Finals ==
=== Singles ===
(United States) Robin White defeated (Australia) Anne Minter 6–7, 6–2, 6–2

=== Doubles ===
(United States) Mary Lou Piatek / (United States) Robin White defeated (United States) Lea Antonoplis / (United States) Wendy White 6–4, 7–6
