= 1984 Virginia Slims of Chicago =

- Date: February 6–12
- Edition: 13th
- Draw: 32S / 16D
- Prize money: $150,000
- Surface: Carpet (Sporteze) / indoor
- Location: Chicago, IL, United States
- Venue: UIC Pavilion

Champions

Singles
- (United States) Pam Shriver

Doubles
- (United States) Billie Jean King / (United States) Sharon Walsh
← 1983 ·	Virginia Slims of Chicago	· 1985 →

The 1984 Virginia Slims of Chicago was a tennis tournament played on indoor carpet courts at the UIC Pavilion in Chicago, Illinois in the United States that was part of the 1983 Virginia Slims World Championship Series (Note: The 1983 Virginia Slims World Championship Series ran from January 1983 through February 1984.). It was the 13th edition of the tournament and was held from February 6 through February 12, 1984. First-seeded Pam Shriver won the singles title and earned $28,000 first-prize money.

== Finals ==
=== Singles ===
(United States) Pam Shriver defeated (United States) Barbara Potter 7–6^{(7–4)}, 2–6, 6–3

- It was Shriver's 2nd title of the year and the 50th of her career.

=== Doubles ===
(United States) Billie Jean King / (United States) Sharon Walsh defeated (United States) Barbara Potter / (United States) Pam Shriver 5–7, 6–3, 6–3

- It was King's 1st title of the year and the 170th of her career. It was Walsh's 2nd title of the year and the 26th of her career.

== Prize money ==
Event	W	F	SF	QF	Round of 16	Round of 32
Singles	$28,000	$14,000	$7,000	$3,350	$1,600	$825
