= Virginia Slims of Pennsylvania =

Defunct tennis tournament
- Event name: Avon Futures of Central Pennsylvania (1981-1982); Ginny of Central Pennsylvania (1983-1984); Virginia Slims of Pennsylvania (1985-1986)
- Tour: Avon Futures Circuit (1981-82); Ginny Circuit (1983-84); Virginia Slims Circuit (1985-86)
- Founded: 1981
- Abolished: 1986
- Editions: 6
- Location: Hershey, Pennsylvania, U.S.
- Venue: Hershey Racquet Club
- Surface: Carpet

The Virginia Slims of Pennsylvania is a defunct WTA Tour affiliated women's tennis tournament founded in 1981 as the Avon Futures of Central Pennsylvania. It was held at the Hershey Racquet Club in Hershey, Pennsylvania in the United States and played on indoor carpet courts until 1986.

Robin White was the most successful player at the tournament, winning the singles and doubles competitions in 1985. She partnered American Mary Lou Piatek in the doubles competition.

== Results ==
=== Singles ===
Year	Champions	Runners-up	Score
1981	(Netherlands) Marianne van der Torre	(West Germany) Heidi Eisterlehner	6–0, 7–6
1982	(Hungary) Andrea Temesvári	(France) Catherine Tanvier	6–4, 6–2
1983	(Canada) Carling Bassett	(United States) Sandy Collins	2–6, 6–0, 6–4
1984	(Sweden) Catarina Lindqvist	(United States) Beth Herr	6–4, 6–0
1985	(United States) Robin White	(Australia) Anne Minter	6–7, 6–2, 6–2
1986	(Australia) Janine Thompson	(France) Catherine Suire	6–1, 6–4

=== Doubles ===
Year	Champions	Runners-up	Score
1983	(United States) Lea Antonoplis (United States) Barbara Jordan	(United States) Sherry Acker (United States) Ann Henricksson	6–3, 6–4
1984	(Czechoslovakia) Kateřina Skronská (Czechoslovakia) Marcela Skuherská	(United States) Ann Henricksson (United States) Nancy Yeargin	6–1, 6–3
1985	(United States) Mary Lou Piatek (United States) Robin White	(United States) Lea Antonoplis (United States) Wendy White	6–4, 7–6
1986	(United States) Candy Reynolds (United States) Anne Smith	(United States) Sandy Collins (United States) Kim Sands	7–6, 6–1
