= 1986 Virginia Slims of Chicago =

- Date: November 10–16
- Edition: 15th
- Draw: 28S / 14D
- Prize money: $150,000
- Surface: Carpet (Supreme) / indoor
- Location: Chicago, Illinois, U.S.
- Venue: UIC Pavilion

Champions

Singles
- (United States) Martina Navratilova

Doubles
- (West Germany) Claudia Kohde-Kilsch (Czechoslovakia) Helena Suková
← 1985 ·	Virginia Slims of Chicago	· 1987 →

The 1986 Virginia Slims of Chicago was a women's tennis tournament played on indoor carpet courts at the UIC Pavilion in Chicago, Illinois in the United States and was part of the 1986 WTA Tour. It was the 15th edition of the tournament and was held from November 10 through November 16, 1986. First-seeded Martina Navratilova won the singles title, her seventh in total at the event, and earned $33,000 first-prize money.

== Finals ==
=== Singles ===
(United States) Martina Navratilova defeated (Czechoslovakia) Hana Mandlíková 7–5, 7–5

- It was Navratilova's 13th singles title of the year and the 124th of her career.

=== Doubles ===
(West Germany) Claudia Kohde-Kilsch / (Czechoslovakia) Helena Suková defeated (West Germany) Steffi Graf / (Argentina) Gabriela Sabatini 6–7^{(5–7)}, 7–6^{(7–5)}, 6–3
