= Janine Thompson =

Australian tennis player (born 1967)

- Full name: Janine Gaye Thompson Tremelling
- Country (sports): Australia
- Residence: Sydney, Australia
- Born: 12 September 1967 (age 57); Sydney, Australia
- Height: 162 cm (5 ft 4 in)
- Prize money: $ 265,345

Singles
- Career record: 39–58 (40.21%)
- Career titles: 1
- Highest ranking: No. 53 (12 May 1986)

Grand Slam singles results
- Australian Open: 4R (1987)
- French Open: 4R (1989)
- Wimbledon: 2R (1989)
- US Open: 1R (1985, 1989)

Doubles
- Career record: 110–78 (58.51%)
- Career titles: 4
- Highest ranking: No. 18 (30 April 1990)

Grand Slam doubles results
- Australian Open: 3R (1985, 1987, 1988, 1990)
- French Open: QF (1988)
- Wimbledon: QF (1986)
- US Open: QF (1988, 1989)

Janine G. Thompson Tremelling (née Thompson; born 12 September 1967) is a former tennis player from Australia who won the Girls' Doubles in the 1985 Wimbledon Championships, with Louise Field.

As of October 2014 she was playing on the seniors tour. As both a singles and doubles player, she featured in the Australian and US Opens, Wimbledon and Roland Garros between 1985 and 1990. She has a career singles win–loss record of 39–58, and a doubles record of 110–78.

Thompson won the 1986 Virginia Slims of Pennsylvania singles title, and won doubles titles in Wellington, Rome and the German Open in 1989, and won competitions in Nashville in 1988.

== WTA Tour finals ==
=== Singles (1 title) ===
Result	W–L	Date	Tournament	Surface	Opponent	Score
Win	1–0	Mar 1986	Hershey, United States	Carpet (i)	(France) Catherine Suire	6–1, 6–4

=== Doubles (4 titles, 5 runners-up) ===
Result	W–L	Date	Tournament	Surface	Partner	Opponents	Score
Loss	0–1	May 1986	Lugano, Switzerland	Clay	(Australia) Jenny Byrne	(United States) Elise Burgin (United States) Betsy Nagelsen	2–6, 3–6
Loss	0–2	Jan 1987	Sydney, Australia	Grass	(Australia) Jenny Byrne	(United States) Betsy Nagelsen (Australia) Elizabeth Smylie	7–6^{(7–5)}, 5–7, 1–6
Loss	0–3	May 1988	Rome, Italy	Clay	(Australia) Jenny Byrne	(Czechoslovakia) Jana Novotná (France) Catherine Suire	3–6, 6–4, 5–7
Loss	0–4	May 1988	Strasbourg, France	Clay	(Australia) Jenny Byrne	(Netherlands) Manon Bollegraf (Australia) Nicole Provis	5–7, 7–6^{(13–11)}, 3–6
Win	1–4	Oct 1988	Nashville, United States	Hard (i)	(Australia) Elizabeth Smylie	(United States) Elise Burgin (South Africa) Rosalyn Fairbank	7–5, 6–7^{(1–7)}, 6–4
Loss	1–5	Jan 1989	Auckland, New Zealand	Hard	(Australia) Elizabeth Smylie	(United States) Patty Fendick (Canada) Jill Hetherington	4–6, 4–6
Win	2–5	Feb 1989	Wellington, New Zealand	Hard	(Australia) Elizabeth Smylie	(Australia) Tracey Morton (Austria) Heidi Sprung	7–6^{(7–3)}, 6–1
Win	3–5	May 1989	Rome, Italy	Clay	(Australia) Elizabeth Smylie	(Netherlands) Manon Bollegraf (Argentina) Mercedes Paz	6–4, 6–3
Win	4–5	May 1989	West Berlin, West Germany	Clay	(Australia) Elizabeth Smylie	(South Africa) Lise Gregory (United States) Gretchen Magers	5–7, 6–3, 6–2
