= 1984 United Jersey Bank Classic =

- Date: August 13–19
- Edition: 7th
- Draw: 56S / 32D
- Prize money: $150,000
- Surface: Hard / outdoor
- Location: Mahwah, New Jersey, U.S.

Champions

Singles
- (United States) Martina Navratilova

Doubles
- (United States) Martina Navratilova / (United States) Pam Shriver
- WTA New Jersey

The 1984 United Jersey Bank Classic was a women's tennis tournament played on outdoor hard courts in Mahwah, New Jersey in the [United States that was part of the 1984 Virginia Slims World Championship Series. The tournament was held from August 13 through August 19, 1984. First-seeded Martina Navratilova won the singles title.

== Finals ==
=== Singles ===
(United States) Martina Navratilova defeated (United States) Pam Shriver 6–4, 4–6, 7–5

- It was Navratilova's 9th singles title of the year and the 95th of her career.

=== Doubles ===
(United States) Martina Navratilova / (United States) Pam Shriver defeated (United Kingdom) Jo Durie / (United States) Ann Kiyomura 7–6^{(7–3)}, 3–6, 6–2

- It was Navratilova's 15th title of the year and the 194th of her career. It was Shriver's 10th title of the year and the 58th of her career.
