= 1986 United Jersey Bank Classic =

- Date: August 18–24
- Edition: 9th
- Draw: 56S / 32D
- Prize money: $150,000
- Surface: Hard / outdoor
- Location: Mahwah, New Jersey, U.S.
- Venue: Ramapo College

Champions

Singles
- (West Germany) Steffi Graf

Doubles
- (United States) Betsy Nagelsen / (Australia) Elizabeth Smylie
- WTA New Jersey

The 1986 United Jersey Bank Classic was a women's tennis tournament played on outdoor hard courts at the Ramapo College in Mahwah, New Jersey in the United States and was part of the 1986 Virginia Slims World Championship Series. It was the ninth edition of the tournament and was held from August 18 through August 24, 1986. First-seeded Steffi Graf won the singles title and earned $29,000 first-prize money.

== Finals ==
=== Singles ===
(West Germany) Steffi Graf defeated (United States) Molly Van Nostrand 7–5, 6–1

- It was Graf's 5th singles title of the year and of her career.

=== Doubles ===
(United States) Betsy Nagelsen / (Australia) Elizabeth Smylie defeated (West Germany) Steffi Graf / (Czechoslovakia) Helena Suková 7–6^{(7–4)}, 6–3
