= Carina Karlsson =

Swedish tennis player

- Full name: Carina Karlsson
- Country (sports): Sweden
- Born: 11 September 1963 (age 63)
- Prize money: $144,163

Singles
- Career record: 57–69
- Highest ranking: No. 42 (June, 1985)

Grand Slam singles results
- Australian Open: 1R (1984, 1985, 1987)
- French Open: 4R (1987)
- Wimbledon: QF (1984)
- US Open: 2R (1986)

Doubles
- Career record: 29–46

Grand Slam doubles results
- Australian Open: 2R (1985, 1987)
- French Open: 1R (1985, 1986, 1987)
- Wimbledon: 2R (1985, 1986)
- US Open: 2R (1985)

Carina Karlsson (born 11 September 1963) is a former professional tennis player from Sweden. She was nicknamed "Kid Carina".

== Biography ==
Karlsson is most noted for being the first qualifier to reach the ladies quarterfinals of Wimbledon, which she achieved at the 1984 Wimbledon Championships. She began the main draw with wins over Anne White and Christiane Jolissaint, then defeated former Wimbledon champion Virginia Wade in the third round, 11–9 in the deciding set. In the fourth round she upset 15th seed Andrea Temesvári to set up a quarterfinal against Chris Evert-Lloyd, which Evert won in straight sets.

Her Wimbledon run took her ranking to 59 in the world, and she peaked at 42 the following year. She was a losing finalist to Katerina Maleeva at the 1985 Hewlett-Packard Trophy in Hilversum. Her performances began to experience a slump, attributed in part to eye problems, and in 1987, she started competing wearing eyeglasses. She made the round of 16 at the 1987 French Open, but retired from professional tennis at the end of the year.

She featured in a total of seven Fed Cup ties for Sweden.

== WTA Tour finals ==
=== Singles (0–1) ===
Result	Date	Tournament	Tier	Surface	Opponent	Score
Loss	Nov 1985	Hilversum, Netherlands	$75,000	Carpet	(Bulgaria) Katerina Maleeva	3–6, 2–6

=== Doubles (0–1) ===
Result	Date	Tournament	Tier	Surface	Partner	Opponents	Score
Loss	Oct 1985	Stuttgart, West Germany	$175,000	Carpet	(Denmark) Tine Scheuer-Larsen	(United States) Pam Shriver (Czechoslovakia) Hana Mandlíková	2–6, 1–6
