= Catherine Suire =

French tennis player

- Country (sports): France
- Born: 15 September 1959 (age 66) Tananarive, Madagascar
- Height: 1.67 m (5 ft 5 1/2 in)
- Plays: Right-handed
- Prize money: US$ 488,888

Singles
- Career record: 207–206
- Career titles: 0
- Highest ranking: No. 52 (14 May 1984)

Grand Slam singles results
- Australian Open: 2R (1983, 1988)
- French Open: 2R (1985, 1986, 1987, 1991)
- Wimbledon: 2R (1983, 1986, 1989, 1991)
- US Open: 3R (1983)

Doubles
- Career record: 224–180
- Career titles: 8
- Highest ranking: No. 13 (18 July 1988)

Grand Slam doubles results
- Australian Open: 3R (1988)
- French Open: QF (1988, 1989)
- Wimbledon: 3R (1986)
- US Open: 3R (1986, 1987, 1988, 1989)

Catherine Suire (born 15 September 1959) is a French former tennis player who competed at the 1988 Summer Olympics in Seoul. She won eight doubles titles in her professional career, and reached her highest individual ranking on the WTA Tour on 14 May 1984, when she became the number 52 of the world.

== Career finals ==
=== Singles (1 loss) ===
Legend
Grand Slam tournaments
WTA Championships
Virginia Slims
Tier I
Tier II
Tier III
Tier IV & V

| Result | W/L | Date | Tournament | Surface | Opponent | Score |
|---|---|---|---|---|---|---|
| Loss | 0–1 | Mar 1986 | Hershey, US | Carpet (i) | (Australia) Janine Thompson | 1–6, 4–6 |

=== Doubles (8 wins, 8 losses) ===
| Result | W/L | Date | Tournament | Surface | Partner | Opponents | Score |
|---|---|---|---|---|---|---|---|
| Win | 1–0 | Oct 1985 | Brighton, United Kingdom | Carpet (i) | (United States) Lori McNeil | (United States) Barbara Potter (Czechoslovakia) Helena Suková | 4–6, 7–6^{(7–3)}, 6–4 |
| Loss | 1–1 | Feb 1986 | Oklahoma City, US | Carpet (i) | (United States) Lori McNeil | (Netherlands) Marcella Mesker (France) Pascale Paradis | 6–2, 6–7^{(1–7)}, 1–6 |
| Win | 2–1 | May 1987 | Strasbourg, France | Clay | (Czechoslovakia) Jana Novotná | (United States) Kathleen Horvath (Netherlands) Marcella Mesker | 6–0, 6–2 |
| Win | 3–1 | Aug 1987 | San Diego, US | Hard | (Czechoslovakia) Jana Novotná | (United States) Elise Burgin (United States) Sharon Walsh | 6–3, 6–4 |
| Loss | 3–2 | Oct 1987 | Zürich, Switzerland | Carpet | (Czechoslovakia) Jana Novotná | (France) Nathalie Herreman (France) Pascale Paradis | 3–6, 6–2, 3–6 |
| Win | 4–2 | Feb 1988 | Oklahoma City, US | Carpet | (Czechoslovakia) Jana Novotná | (Sweden) Catarina Lindqvist (Denmark) Tine Scheuer-Larsen | 6–4, 6–4 |
| Loss | 4–3 | Feb 1988 | Wichita, US | Hard (i) | (Czechoslovakia) Jana Novotná | (Soviet Union) Natalia Egorova (Soviet Union) Svetlana Parkhomenko | 3–6, 4–6 |
| Win | 5–3 | May 1988 | Rome, Italy | Clay | (Czechoslovakia) Jana Novotná | (Australia) Jenny Byrne (Australia) Janine Thompson | 6–3, 4–6, 7–5 |
| Win | 6–3 | Jul 1988 | Nice, France | Clay | (France) Catherine Tanvier | (France) Isabelle Demongeot (France) Nathalie Tauziat | 6–4, 4–6, 6–2 |
| Loss | 6–4 | Sep 1989 | Paris, France | Clay | (France) Nathalie Herreman | (Italy) Sandra Cecchini (Argentina) Patricia Tarabini | 1–6, 1–6 |
| Loss | 6–5 | Oct 1989 | Moscow, USSR | Carpet | (France) Nathalie Herreman | (Soviet Union) Larisa Savchenko (Soviet Union) Natalia Zvereva | 3–6, 4–6 |
| Loss | 6–6 | Apr 1990 | Singapore | Hard | (France) Pascale Paradis | (United Kingdom) Jo Durie (Canada) Jill Hetherington | 4–6, 1–6 |
| Loss | 6–7 | Oct 1990 | Zürich, Switzerland | Carpet | (South Africa) Dianne Van Rensburg | (Netherlands) Manon Bollegraf (West Germany) Eva Pfaff | 5–7, 4–6 |
| Win | 7–7 | Feb 1992 | Cesena, Italy | Carpet | (France) Catherine Tanvier | (Belgium) Sabine Appelmans (Italy) Raffaella Reggi | w/o |
| Loss | 7–8 | Feb 1993 | Paris, France | Carpet (i) | (United Kingdom) Jo Durie | (Czech Republic) Jana Novotná (Czech Republic) Andrea Strnadová | 6–7^{(2–7)}, 2–6 |
| Win | 8–8 | Apr 1993 | Pattaya, Thailand | Hard | (United States) Cammy MacGregor | (United States) Patty Fendick (United States) Meredith McGrath | 6–3, 7–6 |

== ITF finals ==
=== Singles (0–3) ===
Legend
$50,000 tournaments
$25,000 tournaments
$10,000 tournaments

| Result | No. | Date | Tournament | Surface | Opponent | Score |
|---|---|---|---|---|---|---|
| Loss | 1. | 18 November 1979 | Grenoble, France | Hard (i) | (France) Marie-Christine Calleja | 6–1, 4–6, 4–6 |
| Loss | 2. | 2 December 1979 | Poitiers, France | Hard (i) | (France) Isabelle Vernhes | 3–6, 3–6 |
| Loss | 3. | 1 April 1991 | Moulins, France | Carpet (i) | (Germany) Marketa Kochta | 3–6, 4–6 |

=== Doubles (4–2) ===
| Result | No. | Date | Tournament | Surface | Partner | Opponents | Score |
|---|---|---|---|---|---|---|---|
| Win | 1. | 4 December 1989 | Le Havre, France | Clay | (France) Nathalie Herreman | (West Germany) Stefanie Rehmke (Austria) Mirijam Schweda | 6–2, 6–0 |
| Win | 2. | 1 April 1991 | Moulins, France | Carpet (i) | (France) Sandrine Testud | (Netherlands) Ingelise Driehuis (Australia) Louise Pleming | 6–3, 6–4 |
| Win | 3. | 9 December 1991 | Val-d'Oise, France | Hard (i) | (Germany) Eva Pfaff | (France) Pascale Paradis-Mangon (France) Sandrine Testud | 4–6, 6–3, 6–4 |
| Win | 4. | 7 December 1992 | Val-d'Oise, France | Hard (i) | (France) Isabelle Demongeot | (Belgium) Sabine Appelmans (France) Julie Halard-Decugis | 7–5, 6–4 |
| Loss | 5. | 29 March 1993 | Moulins, France | Hard | (France) Isabelle Demongeot | (Latvia) Agnese Blumberga (Czech Republic) Jana Pospíšilová | 6–3, 2–6, 4–6 |
| Loss | 6. | 6 December 1993 | Val-d'Oise, France | Hard | (France) Isabelle Demongeot | (Poland) Magdalena Feistel (Russia) Elena Makarova | 6–2, 3–6, 4–6 |
