= Kim Sands =

American tennis player

- Country (sports): United States
- Born: 11 October 1956 (age 69)
- Turned pro: 1978
- Retired: 1988
- Prize money: US$ 199,233

Singles
- Career record: 43–47
- Career titles: 0
- Highest ranking: No. 44 (April 2, 1984)

Grand Slam singles results
- Australian Open: 2R (1978)
- French Open: 2R (1981, 1983, 1985)
- Wimbledon: 2R (1981, 1983)
- US Open: 1R (1980, 1981, 1982, 1983, 1984, 1986)

Doubles
- Career record: 37–38
- Career titles: 0
- Highest ranking: No. 31 (August 17, 1987)

Grand Slam doubles results
- Australian Open: 1R (1982)
- French Open: 3R (1984)
- Wimbledon: 3R (1979, 1980, 1981)
- US Open: 3R (1985)

Kim Sands (born 11 October 1956) is an American former professional tennis player. She reached 44th in the WTA rankings in April 1984 and became the first African-American woman to receive a scholarship to the University of Miami where she earned a Bachelor of Education degree.
