= 1983 Virginia Slims of Indianapolis – Singles =

Singles
- 1983 Virginia Slims of Indianapolis

Final
- Champion: (United Kingdom) Anne Hobbs
- Runner-up: (United States) Ginny Purdy
- Score: 6–4, 6–7, 6–4

Events
Singles	Doubles
← 1982 ·	Virginia Slims of Indianapolis	· 1984 →

Anne Hobbs won in the final 6–4, 6–7, 6–4 against Ginny Purdy.

== Seeds ==
A champion seed is indicated in bold text while text in italics indicates the round in which that seed was eliminated.

1. (South Africa) Yvonne Vermaak (semifinals)
2. (Italy) Sabina Simmonds (second round)
3. (United States) Kathleen Horvath (first round)
4. (United States) Kate Latham (first round)
5. (Romania) Lucia Romanov (second round)
6. (Brazil) Patricia Medrado (first round)
7. (Czechoslovakia) Iva Budařová (semifinals)
8. (United States) Candy Reynolds (quarterfinals)

== Draw ==
=== Key ===
- Q = Qualifier
- WC = Wild card
- LL = Lucky loser
- Alt = Alternate
- SE = Special exempt
- PR = Protected ranking
- ITF = ITF entry
- JE = Junior exempt
- w/o = Walkover
- r = Retired
- d = Defaulted
- SR = Special ranking

First round
1	(South Africa) **Y Vermaak**	**6**	**7**
(France) C Vanier	2	6
(Australia) A Minter	6	2
(Brazil) **C Monteiro**	**7**	**6**
(Switzerland) C Pasquale	6	5
(Switzerland) **P Delhees**	**7**	**7**
(South Africa) S Rollinson	3	0
8	(United States) **C Reynolds**	**6**	**6**
3	(United States) K Horvath	2	0
(United States) **B Hallquist**	**6**	**6**
(Peru) L Arraya	0	0
LL	(Switzerland) **C Jolissaint**	**6**	**6**
(Czechoslovakia) K Skronská	3	**6**	2
Q	(United Kingdom) **A Hobbs**	**6**	0	**6**
(United States) L Antonoplis	3	2
5	(Romania) **L Romanov**	**6**	**6**
6	(Brazil) P Medrado	4	1
Q	(Sweden) **C Lindqvist**	**6**	**6**
(South Africa) J Mundel	5	**6**	3
(United States) **B Jordan**	**7**	2	**6**
Q	(Switzerland) L Drescher	5	3
(United States) **G Purdy**	**7**	**6**
(United States) **N Yeargin**	2	**7**	**7**
4	(United States) K Latham	**6**	5	6
7	(Czechoslovakia) **I Budařová**	**6**	**6**
(United States) J Klitch	2	2
(United States) **A-M Fernandez**	1	**6**	**6**
(Canada) C Bassett	**6**	3	2
(United States) **M Louie**	**6**	**6**
Q	(United States) J Harrington	3	2
(United States) C Benjamin	5	4
2	(Italy) **S Simmonds**	**7**	**6**

Second round
1	(South Africa) **Y Vermaak**	**6**	3	**6**
(Brazil) C Monteiro	4	**6**	3
(Switzerland) P Delhees	2	1
8	(United States) **C Reynolds**	**6**	**6**
(United States) B Hallquist	5	1
LL	(Switzerland) **C Jolissaint**	**7**	**6**
Q	(United Kingdom) **A Hobbs**	**6**	**6**
5	(Romania) L Romanov	4	3
Q	(Sweden) **C Lindqvist**	4	**6**	**6**
(United States) B Jordan	**6**	1	0
(United States) **G Purdy**	**6**	**6**
(United States) N Yeargin	2	2
7	(Czechoslovakia) **I Budařová**	**7**	**7**
(United States) A-M Fernandez	6	5
(United States) **M Louie**	**6**	**6**
2	(Italy) S Simmonds	1	3

Quarterfinals
1	(South Africa) **Y Vermaak**	**7**	3	**6**
8	(United States) C Reynolds	6	**6**	2
LL	(Switzerland) C Jolissaint	4	**7**	4
Q	(United Kingdom) **A Hobbs**	**6**	6	**6**
Q	(Sweden) C Lindqvist	6	4
(United States) **G Purdy**	**7**	**6**
7	(Czechoslovakia) **I Budařová**	**6**	**6**
(United States) M Louie	4	4

Semifinals
1	(South Africa) Y Vermaak	2	5
Q	(United Kingdom) **A Hobbs**	**6**	**7**
(United States) **G Purdy**	**7**	**7**
7	(Czechoslovakia) I Budařová	6	5

Final
Q	(United Kingdom) **Anne Hobbs**	**6**	6	**6**
(United States) Ginny Purdy	4	**7**	4
