= 1983 WTA Congoleum Classic =

- Date: February 28 – March 6
- Edition: 1st
- Draw: 28S / 14D
- Prize money: $50,000
- Surface: Hard / outdoor
- Location: Palm Springs, California, U.S.

Champions

Singles
- (South Africa) Yvonne Vermaak

Doubles
- (United States) Kathy Jordan / (United States) Ann Kiyomura
WTA Congoleum Classic

The 1983 WTA Congoleum Classic was a women's tennis tournament played on outdoor hard courts in Palm Springs, California in the United States that was part of the 1983 Virginia Slims World Championship Series. The tournament was held from February 28 through March 6, 1983. Sixth-seeded Yvonne Vermaak won the singles title.

== Finals ==
=== Singles ===
(South Africa) Yvonne Vermaak defeated (Canada) Carling Bassett 6–3, 7–5

- It was Vermaak's 1st title of the year and the 2nd of her career.

=== Doubles ===
(United States) Kathy Jordan / (United States) Ann Kiyomura defeated (Australia) Dianne Fromholtz / (Netherlands) Betty Stöve 6–2, 6–2

- It was Jordan's 1st title of the year and the 20th of her career. It was Kiyomura's 1st title of the year and the 14th of her career.
