= 1983 Virginia Slims of Indianapolis =

- Date: February 7–14
- Edition: 3rd
- Category: Ginny Tournament Circuit
- Prize money: $50,000
- Surface: Carpet / indoor
- Location: Indianapolis, Indiana, U.S.

Champions

Singles
- (United Kingdom) Anne Hobbs

Doubles
- (United States) Lea Antonoplis / (United States) Barbara Jordan
← 1982 ·	Virginia Slims of Indianapolis	· 1984 →

The 1983 Virginia Slims of Indianapolis was a women's tennis tournament played on indoor carpet courts in Indianapolis, Indiana in the United States that was part of the Ginny Tournament Circuit (Note: The 1983 Ginny Tournament Circuit consisted of eight $50,000 events played between February and September, followed by a $100,000 Ginny Championships in November. All tournaments were held in the United States.) of the 1983 Virginia Slims World Championship Series. It was the third edition of the tournament and was held from February 7 through February 14, 1983. Anne Hobbs won the singles title.

== Finals ==
=== Singles ===
(United Kingdom) Anne Hobbs defeated (United States) Ginny Purdy 6–4, 6–7, 6–4

- It was Hobbs' 1st title of the year and the 2nd of her career.

=== Doubles ===
(United States) Lea Antonoplis / (United States) Barbara Jordan defeated (South Africa) Rosalyn Fairbank / (United States) Candy Reynolds 5–7, 6–4, 7–5

- It was Antonoplis' only title of the year and the 1st of her career. It was Jordan's 1st title of the year and the 7th of her career.
