= Avon Futures of Southwest Florida =

Defunct tennis tournament
- Event name: Barnett Bank Classic of Ft. Myers (1974-75); Futures of Ft. Myers (1976); Avon Futures of Southwest Florida (1977-82)
- Tour: Virginia Slims Mini-Circuit (1974-75); Avon Futures Circuit
- Founded: 1974
- Abolished: 1982
- Location: Fort Myers, Florida, United States
- Venue: Lochmoor Country Club (1974-80); Fort Myers Racquet Club (1981-82)
- Category: Futures
- Surface: Clay / outdoor (1974-1980); Hard / indoor (1981-1982)
- Draw: 32 (S)
- Prize money: $3,000 (1974) $40,000 (1982)

The Avon Futures of Southwest Florida was a USLTA/WTA affiliated clay court then later indoor hard court tennis tournament founded in 1974 as the Barnett Bank Classic of Ft. Myers. It was first played at the Lochmoor Country Club, in Fort Myers, Florida, United States, . The event ran annually until 1982 when it was last played at the Fort Myers Racquet Club then was discontinued.

== History ==
This event began in 1974 as part of the Virginia Slims Mini-Circuit a forerunner to the Avon Futures Circuit. It was announced that it would part of a five satellite tournament held in Florida at Ocala, Fort Myers, Winter Haven, Pensacola and Seebring.

The circuit offered prize money of $3,000 per tournament provided by Barnett Bank of Florida with the USLTA providing players are ranked outside the world top 32, the winners of each event then qualify to enter an event on the main Virginia Slims Circuit.32,

The tournament was played on outdoor clay courts until 1980, then switched to indoor hard courts for the duration of its run till 1982 when it was discontinued when prize money had climbed to $40,000.

== Past finals ==
=== Singles ===
Year	Winner	Runner-up	Score
1974	(United States) Kate Latham	(United States) Janet Haas	6–3, 4–6, 6–4
1975	(United States) Donna Ganz	(Soviet Union) Marina Kroshina	6–4, 6–2
1976	(United States) Kathy May	(United States) Ann Kiyomura	5–7, 6–3, 6–1
1977	(South Africa) Linky Boshoff	(United States) Zenda Liess	6–4, 6–4
1978	(United States) Renée Richards	(United States) Laura duPont	6–1, 6–7, 6–4
1979	(Czechoslovakia) Regina Maršíková	(United States) Janet Newberry	6–4, 6–2
1980	(United States) Jeanne Duvall	(United States) Felicia Raschiatore	6–4, 3–6, 6–3
1981	(United States) Ann Kiyomura	(United States) Kathleen Cummings	6–3, 6–2
1982	(South Korea) Lee Duk-hee	(South Africa) Yvonne Vermaak	6–0, 6–3

=== Doubles ===
Year	Winners	Runners-up	Score
1974	(Czechoslovakia) Miroslava Kozeluhova (Czechoslovakia) Renata Tomanova	(United States) Sally Greer (Japan) Naoko Sato	7–5, 6–7, 7–6
1975	(Soviet Union) Natasha Chmyreva (Soviet Union) Marina Kroshina	(United Kingdom) Lesley Blachford (Belgium) Michèle Gurdal	6–2, 6–2
1976	(United States) Rayni Fox (United States) Betsy Nagelsen	(United States) Sue Mehmedbasich (United States) Marita Redondo	6–2, 6–2
1977	(South Africa) Linky Boshoff (South Africa) Ilana Kloss	(United States) Lele Forood (United States) Candy Reynolds	6–2, 6–3
1978	(Australia) Pam Whytcross (Australia) Chris O'Neil	(United States) Ann Kiyomura (United States) Renée Richards	6–3, 6–1
1979	(United States) Diane Desfor (United States) Barbara Hallquist	(Canada) Marjorie Blackwood (Australia) Kym Ruddell	6–4, 6–4
1980	(United States) Diane Desfor (United States) Barbara Hallquist	(United States) Carrie Meyer (Italy) Sabina Simmonds	6–3, 6–1
1981	(United States) Rene Blount (United States) Dianne Morrison	(United States) Renée Richards (United States) Joyce Portman	6–1, 6–3
1982	(Canada) Marjorie Blackwood (Australia) Susan Leo	(Brazil) Pat Medrado (Brazil) Cláudia Monteiro	2–6, 6–1, 6–2
