= 1983 Ginny Championships =

- Date: November 7 – 13
- Edition: 1st
- Category: Ginny Tournament Circuit
- Draw: 15S / 5D
- Prize money: $100,000
- Surface: Carpet / indoors
- Location: Honolulu, Hawaii, U.S.
- Venue: Neal S. Blaisdell Center

Champions

Singles
- (United States) Kathleen Horvath

Doubles
- (South Africa) Rosalyn Fairbank / (United States) Candy Reynolds
- Ginny Championships

The 1983 Ginny Championships was a women's tennis tournament played on indoor carpet courts at the Neal S. Blaisdell Center in Honolulu, Hawaii in the United States. It was the final of the Ginny Tournament Circuit (Note: The 1983 Ginny Tournament Circuit consisted of eight $50,000 events played between February and September, followed by the Ginny Championships. All tournaments were held in the United States.) that was part of the 1983 Virginia Slims World Championship Series.

It was the inaugural edition of the tournament and was held from November 7 through November 13, 1983. Second-seeded Kathleen Horvath won the singles title.

== Finals ==
=== Singles ===
(United States) Kathleen Horvath defeated (Canada) Carling Bassett 4–6, 6–2, 7–6^{(7–1)}

- It was Horvath's 2nd title of the year and the 4th of her career.

=== Doubles ===
(South Africa) Rosalyn Fairbank / (United States) Candy Reynolds defeated (United States) Lea Antonoplis / (United States) Barbara Jordan 5–7, 7–5, 6–3

- It was Fairbank's 6th title of the year and the 9th of her career. It was Reynolds' 8th title of the year and the 16th of her career.
