= 1991 Westchester Cup – Singles =

Singles
- 1991 Westchester Cup

Final
- Champion: (France) Isabelle Demongeot
- Runner-up: (United States) Lori McNeil
- Score: 6–4, 6–4

Details
- Draw: 32 (4Q/1LL)
- Seeds: 8

Events
Singles	Doubles
- Virginia Slims of New York

No defending champions were declared, as the last tournament was held in 1985. Barbara Potter, the winner of that edition, retired from professional tennis in 1989.

Isabelle Demongeot won the title by defeating Lori McNeil 6–4, 6–4 in the final.

== Seeds ==
1. (Peru) Laura Gildemeister (semifinals)
2. (United States) Lori McNeil (final)
3. (United States) Susan Sloane (first round)
4. (Sweden) Catarina Lindqvist (first round)
5. (South Africa) Rosalyn Fairbenk-Nideffer (semifinals)
6. (United States) Carrie Cunningham (quarterfinals)
7. (United States) Donna Faber (second round)
8. (United States) Debbie Graham (quarterfinals)

== Draw ==
Key

- Q = Qualifier
- WC = Wild card
- LL = Lucky loser
- Alt = Alternate
- ITF = ITF entry
- PR = Protected ranking
- SR = Special ranking
- SE = Special exempt
- JE = Junior exempt
- JR = Junior Accelerator Programme entrant
- CO = College Accelerator Programme entrant
- NG = Next Gen Accelerator Program entrant
- w/o = Walkover
- r = Retired
- d = Defaulted

=== Finals ===
Semifinals
1	(Peru) Laura Gildemeister	1	1
(France) Isabelle Demongeot	6	6
5	(South Africa) Rosalyn Fairbank-Nideffer	7	2	1
2	(United States) Lori McNeil	5	6	6

Final
(France) Isabelle Demongeot	6	6
2	(United States) Lori McNeil	4	4

=== Top half ===
First round
1	(Peru) L Gildemeister	6	7
Q	(Netherlands) K Boogert	4	5
(Australia) L Field	6	2
(United States) A Leand	1	0^{r}
(Germany) M Kochta	3	6	6
(Soviet Union) T Ignatieva	6	2	1
(United States) C Moros	7	1	2
7	(United States) D Faber	5	6	6
4	(Sweden) C Lindqvist	4	7	4
(France) I Demongeot	6	5	6
Q	(France) S Amiach	6	6
(United States) S Martin	4	1
(United States) C Rubin	2	0
Q	(United States) Terri O'Reilly	6	6
(Poland) R Baranski	1	1
6	(United States) C Cunningham	6	6

Second round
1	(Peru) L Gildemeister	7	6
(Australia) L Field	5	4
(Germany) M Kochta	6	6
7	(United States) D Faber	1	0
(France) I Demongeot	6	6
Q	(France) S Amiach	4	3
Q	(United States) Terri O'Reilly	5	1
6	(United States) C Cunningham	7	6

Quarterfinals
1	(Peru) L Gildemeister	6	6
(Germany) M Kochta	2	4
(France) I Demongeot	7^{7}	6
6	(United States) C Cunningham	6^{4}	3

Semifinals
1	(Peru) L Gildemeister	1	1
(France) I Demongeot	6	6

=== Bottom half ===
First round
5	(South Africa) R Fairbank-Nideffer	6	6
(United States) A Keller	0	3
(United States) E deLone	6	6
(United States) K Adams	3	4
(United States) L Spadea	3	2
(United States) Lo Allen	6	6
Q	(United States) L Raymond	6	7
3	(United States) S Sloane	3	5
8	(United States) D Graham	7^{7}	6
(United States) A Henricksson	6^{2}	3
(United Kingdom) S Loosemore	7	4	7^{7}
(Peru) P Vásquez	5	6	6^{4}
(United States) A Farley	6	6
LL	(Australia) J Taylor	1	1
(Australia) N Pratt	3	5
2	(United States) L McNeil	6	7

Second round
5	(South Africa) R Fairbank-Nideffer	7	6
(United States) E deLone	5	1
(United States) Lo Allen	6	4	2
Q	(United States) L Raymond	3	6	6
8	(United States) D Graham	6	7^{7}
(United Kingdom) S Loosemore	2	6^{3}
(United States) A Farley	7^{7}	3	6^{1}
2	(United States) L McNeil	6^{3}	6	7^{7}

Quarterfinals
5	(South Africa) R Fairbank-Nideffer	6	6
Q	(United States) L Raymond	3	3
8	(United States) D Graham	5	0
2	(United States) L McNeil	7	6

Semifinals
5	(South Africa) R Fairbank-Nideffer	7	2	1
2	(United States) L McNeil	5	6	6
