= 1983 Virginia Slims of Indianapolis – Doubles =

Doubles
- 1983 Virginia Slims of Indianapolis

Final
- Champions: (United States) Lea Antonoplis (United States) Barbara Jordan
- Runners-up: (South Africa) Rosalyn Fairbank (United States) Candy Reynolds
- Score: 5–7, 6–4, 7–5

Events
Singles	Doubles
← 1982 ·	Virginia Slims of Indianapolis	· 1984 →

Lea Antonoplis and Barbara Jordan won in the final 5–7, 6–4, 7–5 against Rosalyn Fairbank and Candy Reynolds.

== Seeds ==
Champion seeds are indicated in bold text while text in italics indicates the round in which those seeds were eliminated.

1. (United States) Kathleen Horvath / (South Africa) Yvonne Vermaak (semifinals)
2. (United States) **Lea Antonoplis** / (United States) **Barbara Jordan (champions)**
3. (South Africa) Rosalyn Fairbank / (United States) Candy Reynolds (final)
4. (Brazil) Patricia Medrado / (Brazil) Cláudia Monteiro (quarterfinals)

== Draw ==
=== Key ===
- Q = Qualifier
- WC = Wild card
- LL = Lucky loser
- Alt = Alternate
- SE = Special exempt
- PR = Protected ranking
- ITF = ITF entry
- JE = Junior exempt
- w/o = Walkover
- r = Retired
- d = Defaulted
- SR = Special ranking

First round
1	(United States) **K Horvath** (South Africa) **Y Vermaak**	**6**	**6**
(Peru) L Arraya (United States) K Steinmetz	2	4
(United Kingdom) **D Jarrett** (Australia) **A Tobin**	4	**6**	**7**
(United Kingdom) A Hobbs (Australia) S Leo	**6**	3	6
3	(South Africa) **R Fairbank** (United States) **C Reynolds**	**6**	**6**
(United States) A-M Fernandez (United States) B Hallquist	3	2
(United States) **S Acker** (United States) **A Henricksson**	**6**	6	**6**
(United States) K Latham (United States) N Yeargin	3	**7**	2
(Australia) **C O'Neil** (Australia) **P Whytcross**	**7**	2	**6**
(United States) C Benjamin (France) C Vanier	5	**6**	3
(Canada) C Bassett (Italy) S Simmonds	1	2
4	(Brazil) **P Medrado** (Brazil) **C Monteiro**	**6**	**6**
(Switzerland) **P Delhees** (Switzerland) **C Jolissaint**	**6**	**6**
(South Africa) B Mould (Australia) E Sayers	2	3
(Czechoslovakia) I Budařová (Czechoslovakia) M Skuherská	0	3
2	(United States) **L Antonoplis** (United States) **B Jordan**	**6**	**6**

Quarterfinals
1	(United States) **K Horvath** (South Africa) **Y Vermaak**	**6**	**6**
(United Kingdom) D Jarrett (Australia) A Tobin	1	0
3	(South Africa) **R Fairbank** (United States) **C Reynolds**	**6**	**6**
(United States) S Acker (United States) A Henricksson	4	0
(Australia) **C O'Neil** (Australia) **P Whytcross**	3	**6**	**6**
4	(Brazil) P Medrado (Brazil) C Monteiro	**6**	2	3
(Switzerland) P Delhees (Switzerland) C Jolissaint	4	**6**	2
2	(United States) **L Antonoplis** (United States) **B Jordan**	**6**	3	**6**

Semifinals
1	(United States) K Horvath (South Africa) Y Vermaak	5	5
3	(South Africa) **R Fairbank** (United States) **C Reynolds**	**7**	**7**
(Australia) C O'Neil (Australia) P Whytcross	6	4
2	(United States) **L Antonoplis** (United States) **B Jordan**	**7**	**6**

Final
3	(South Africa) Rosalyn Fairbank (United States) Candy Reynolds	**7**	4	5
2	(United States) **Lea Antonoplis** (United States) **Barbara Jordan**	5	**6**	**7**
