= 1983 Pittsburgh Open =

- Date: March 7 – 14
- Edition: 2nd
- Category: Ginny Tournament Circuit
- Draw: 32S / 16D
- Prize money: $50,000
- Surface: Carpet / indoors
- Location: Monroeville, Pennsylvania, U.S.
- Venue: The Racquet Club

Champions

Singles
- (United States) Ginny Purdy

Doubles
- (United States) Candy Reynolds / (United States) Paula Smith
← 1979 ·	Pittsburgh Open	· 1984 →

The 1983 Pittsburgh Open, also known as the Ginny of Pittsburgh, was a women's tennis tournament played on indoor carpet courts at the Racquet Club in Monroeville, Pennsylvania in the United States that was part of the Ginny Tournament Circuit (Note: The 1983 Ginny Tournament Circuit consisted of eight $50,000 events played between February and September, followed by a $100,000 Ginny Championships in November. All tournaments were held in the United States.) of the 1983 Virginia Slims World Championship Series. It was the second edition of the tournament and was held from March 7 through March 14, 1983. Unseeded Ginny Purdy won the singles title.

== Finals ==
=== Singles ===
(United States) Ginny Purdy defeated (Brazil) Cláudia Monteiro 6–2, 7–5

- It was Purdy's only title of the year and the 1st of her career.

=== Doubles ===
(United States) Candy Reynolds / (United States) Paula Smith defeated (Poland) Iwona Kuczyńska / (United States) Trey Lewis 6–2, 6–2

- It was Reynolds' 2nd title of the year and the 10th of her career. It was Smith's only title of the year and the 8th of her career.
