= 1983 Ginny Championships – Doubles =

Doubles
- 1983 Ginny Championships

Final
- Champions: (South Africa) Rosalyn Fairbank (United States) Candy Reynolds
- Runners-up: (United States) Lea Antonoplis (United States) Barbara Jordan
- Score: 5–7, 7–5, 6–3

Details
- Draw: 5
- Seeds: 2

Events
Singles	Doubles
- Ginny Championships

In the inaugural edition of the tournament, Rosalyn Fairbank and Candy Reynolds won the title by defeating Lea Antonoplis and Barbara Jordan 5–7, 7–5, 6–3 in the final.

== Seeds ==
Both seeds received a bye to the semifinals.

1. (South Africa) Rosalyn Fairbank / (United States) Candy Reynolds (champions)
2. (United States) Lea Antonoplis / (United States) Barbara Jordan (final)

== Draw ==
First round
(United States) Sandy Collins (Australia) Elizabeth Smylie	4	6	6
(United States) Kyle Copeland (United States) Lori McNeil	6	0	1

Semifinals
1	(South Africa) Rosalyn Fairbank (United States) Candy Reynolds	6	7
(United States) Sandy Collins (Australia) Elizabeth Smylie	2	5
(Brazil) Cláudia Monteiro (South Africa) Yvonne Vermaak	4	3
2	(United States) Lea Antonoplis (United States) Barbara Jordan	6	6

Final
1	(South Africa) Rosalyn Fairbank (United States) Candy Reynolds	5	7	6
2	(United States) Lea Antonoplis (United States) Barbara Jordan	7	5	3
