= Avon Futures of Austin =

Defunct tennis tournament
- Tour: Avon Futures Circuit
- Founded: 1976
- Abolished: 1979
- Editions: 2
- Location: Austin, Texas; United States
- Venue: Caswell Tennis Center (1976); Penick-Allison Tennis Center (1979)
- Category: Futuresy
- Surface: Hard / outdoor
- Prize money: $10,000 (1976) $25,000 (1979)

The Avon Futures of Austin was a USTA/WTA affiliated hard court tennis tournament founded in 1976 as the Futures of Austin. The event was first played at the Caswell Tennis Center, Austin Texas, United States in 1976 then stopped. In 1979 it was revived for one nore edition and played at the University of Austin Penick-Allison Tennis Center when it was discontinued.

== History ==
The event was founded in 1976 as the Futures of Austin, and was played on public municipal courts at the Caswell Tennis Center for one edition only.

In 1979 the tournament was revived and was played at the University of Austin, Penick-Allison Tennis Center for one season only as part of the Avon Futures Circuit.

== Past finals ==
=== Singles ===
Year	Winner	Runner-up	Score
1976	(United States) Janice Metcalf	(United States) Fern Kaigler	6–4, 6–2
1979	(United States) Betty-Ann Stuart	(United States) Barbara Jordan	6–3, 5–7, 7–5

=== Doubles ===
Year	Winner	Runner-up	Score
1976	(United States) Janice Metcalf (United States) Jane Stratton	(United States) Susie Mehmedbasich (United States) Lynne Epstein	6–3, 6–1
1979	(Canada) Marjorie Blackwood (United States) Paula Smith	(United States) Betty-Ann Stuart (United States) Valerie Ziegenfuss	6–2, 6–4
