= Avon Futures of Columbus =

Defunct tennis tournament
- Tour: Avon Futures Circuit
- Sponsor: Avon Company
- Founded: 1977
- Abolished: 1981
- Editions: 5
- Location: Columbus, Ohio, United States
- Venue: Ohio State Fairgrounds Fairgrounds Coliseum (1977-1979); Racquet Club of Columbus (1980-1981)
- Surface: Carpet / indoor
- Draw: 32 (S)
- Prize money: $20,000 (1977) $30,000 (1981)

The Avon Futures of Columbus was a WTA affiliated indoor carpet court tennis tournament founded in 1977. It was first played at the Ohio State Fairgrounds Fairgrounds Coliseum, in Columbus, Ohio, United States. The event ran annually until 1981 when it was discontinued.

== Past finals ==
=== Singles ===
Year	Winner	Runner-up	Score
1977	(South Africa) Yvonne Vermaak	(United Kingdom) Lindsey Beaven	7–5, 6–2
1978	(United States) Pam Shriver	(United States) Kate Latham	6–1, 6–3
1979	(United States) Renee Blount	(Czechoslovakia) Iva Budařová	7–6, 6–1
1980	(United States) Peanut Louie	(United States) Beth Norton	6–2, 6–3
1981	(United States) Betsy Nagelsen	(United States) Renee Blount	7–6, 6–4

=== Doubles ===
Year	Winners	Runners-up	Score
1978	(United States) Ann Kiyomura (United Kingdom) Sue Mappin	(Israel) Paulina Peisachov (United States) Renee Richards	6–2, 6–4
1979	(United States) Bunny Bruning (South Africa) Yvonne Vermaak	(Canada) Marjorie Blackwood (Australia) Kym Ruddell	7–6, 6–4
1980	(United States) Ann Henricksson (United States) Felicia Hutnick	(United States) Lindsay Morse (United States) Candy Reynolds	7–6, 4–6, 6–4
1981	(Netherlands) Marcella Mesker (Switzerland) Christiane Jolissaint	(United States) Renee Blount (United States) Jane Stratton	6–3, 6–4
