= Wild Dunes Women's International =

Defunct tennis tournament
- Event name: Avon Futures of Greenville (1981); Avon Futures of Carolina (1982); Seabrook Open (1985; Wild Dunes Women's International (1986-1987)
- Founded: 1981
- Abolished: 1987
- Surface: Clay (1985–87)

The Wild Dunes Women's International was a WTA Tour affiliated tennis tennis tournament founded in 1981 as the Avon Futures of Greenville. Also known by its tour name WTA South Carolina. The tournament was last played at the Wild Dunes Resort, Wild Dunes. Isle of Palms, Charleston County, South Carolina, United States.tournament played from 1981 to 1987.

== History ==
It was held in three locations; twice in Greenville in 1981 and 1982 as part of the Avon Futures Circuit, then was discontinued. In 1985 it was revived as the Seabrook Open and played at Seabrook Island, Charleston County. In 1986 it was moved to its final location for two editions at the Wild Dunes Resort Hotel, Wild Dunes on the Isle of Palms, Charleston County.

== Past finals ==
=== Singles ===
Year	Champions	Runners-up	Score
1981	(Sweden) Lena Sandin	(United States) Roberta McCallum	7–5, 6–2
1982	(Brazil) Cláudia Monteiro	(United Kingdom) Jo Durie	6–4, 3–6, 6–4
1985	(Bulgaria) Katerina Maleeva	(Romania) Virginia Ruzici	6–3, 6–3
1986	(United States) Elise Burgin	(Denmark) Tine Scheuer-Larsen	6–1, 6–3
1987	(Bulgaria) Manuela Maleeva-Fragnière	(Italy) Raffaella Reggi	5–7, 6–2, 6–3

=== Doubles ===
Year	Champions	Runners-up	Score
1985	(Soviet Union) Svetlana Parkhomenko (Soviet Union) Larisa Savchenko	(United States) Elise Burgin (United States) Lori McNeil	6–1, 6–3
1986	(Italy) Sandra Cecchini (Socialist Federal Republic of Yugoslavia) Sabrina Goleš	(Peru) Laura Gildemeister (Czechoslovakia) Marcela Skuherská	4–6, 6–0, 6–3
1987	(Peru) Laura Gildemeister (Denmark) Tine Scheuer-Larsen	(Argentina) Mercedes Paz (United States) Candy Reynolds	6–4, 6–4

== Event names ==
Official

- Avon Futures of Greenville (1981)
- Avon Futures of Carolina (1982)
- Seabrook Open (1985)
- Wild Dunes Women's International (1986–1987)

== Sources ==
- WTA Tour history
