= 1991 Westchester Cup – Doubles =

Doubles
- 1991 Westchester Cup

Final
- Champions: (South Africa) Rosalyn Fairbank-Nideffer (South Africa) Lise Gregory
- Runners-up: (United States) Katrina Adams (United States) Lori McNeil
- Score: 7–5, 6–4

Details
- Draw: 16 (1Q)
- Seeds: 4

Events
Singles	Doubles
- Virginia Slims of New York

No defending champions were declared, as the last tournament was held in 1985. Mercedes Paz and Gabriela Sabatini, the winners of that edition, did not compete this year. Paz chose to represent her country at the Fed Cup during the same week.

Rosalyn Fairbank-Nideffer and Lise Gregory won the title by defeating Katrina Adams and Lori McNeil 7–5, 6–4 in the final.

== Seeds ==
1. (United States) Katrina Adams / (United States) Lori McNeil (final)
2. (South Africa) Rosalyn Fairbank-Nideffer / (South Africa) Lise Gregory (champions)
3. (Australia) Louise Field / (Australia) Tracey Morton (semifinals)
4. (Peru) Laura Gildemeister / (Sweden) Catarina Lindqvist (first round)

== Draw ==
Key

- Q = Qualifier
- WC = Wild card
- LL = Lucky loser
- Alt = Alternate
- ITF = ITF entry
- PR = Protected ranking
- SR = Special ranking
- SE = Special exempt
- JE = Junior exempt
- JR = Junior Accelerator Programme entrant
- CO = College Accelerator Programme entrant
- NG = Next Gen Accelerator Program entrant
- w/o = Walkover
- r = Retired
- d = Defaulted

=== Draw ===
First round
1	(United States) K Adams (United States) L McNeil	7	6
(United States) E deLone (United States) L Raymond	5	3
(United States) Lo Allen (France) S Amiach	4	7^{7}	6
(United States) A Gooden (Australia) N Pratt	6	6^{0}	4
4	(Peru) L Gildemeister (Sweden) C Lindqvist	7^{7}	1	4
(United States) C Cunningham (United States) J Smoller	6^{3}	6	6
(United States) J Fuchs (United States) L Glitz	6	6
(United States) C Rubin (United States) L Spadea	2	3
(Poland) R Baranski (United States) D Faber	3	0
Q	(United Kingdom) A Grunfeld (United States) N Sodupe	6	6
(United States) P O'Reilly (United States) Terri O'Reilly	7^{9}	3	0
3	(Australia) L Field (Australia) T Morton	6^{7}	6	6
(United States) A Henricksson (United States) P Mager	w/o
(United States) A Keller (United States) A Leand
(United States) N Arendt (United States) Christine O'Reilly	2	5
2	(South Africa) R Fairbank-Nideffer (South Africa) L Gregory	6	7

Quarterfinals
1	(United States) K Adams (United States) L McNeil	6	6
(United States) Lo Allen (France) S Amiach	3	3
(United States) C Cunningham (United States) J Smoller	5	6	6
(United States) J Fuchs (United States) L Glitz	7	1	4
Q	(United Kingdom) A Grunfeld (United States) N Sodupe	1	2
3	(Australia) L Field (Australia) T Morton	6	6
(United States) A Henricksson (United States) P Mager	1	1
2	(South Africa) R Fairbank-Nideffer (South Africa) L Gregory	6	6

Semifinals
1	(United States) K Adams (United States) L McNeil	6	3	6
(United States) C Cunningham (United States) J Smoller	3	6	4
3	(Australia) L Field (Australia) T Morton	6	2	2
2	(South Africa) R Fairbank-Nideffer (South Africa) L Gregory	1	6	6

Final
1	(United States) K Adams (United States) L McNeil	5	4
2	(South Africa) R Fairbank-Nideffer (South Africa) L Gregory	7	6
