= Avon Futures of Montreal =

Defunct tennis tournament
- Tour: Avon Futures Circuit
- Founded: 1978
- Abolished: 1982
- Editions: 4
- Location: Montreal, Canada
- Venue: Club Sportif Cote de Liesse (1978, 1979); Mirabel Racquet Club (1981, 1982)
- Surface: Hard / indoor
- Draw: 32 (S)
- Prize money: $20,000 (1978) $40,000 (1982)

The Avon Futures of Montreal was a WTA affiliated indoor hard court tennis tournament. It was first played at the Club Sportif Cote de Liesse, in Montreal, Canada in 1978, The event ran annually until 1982 when it was discontinued.

== History ==
The Avon Futures of Canada launched in 1978 at the Club Sportif Côte de Liesse, in Montreal, Canada. In 1981 it moved to the Mirabel Racquet Club. The event was established as a vital winter stop for the women's Avon Futures Circuit. Hana Strachoňová claimed the inaugural title, marking the start of a brief but significant era for professional indoor tennis in Montreal. These early editions provided a competitive platform for rising stars to earn points and transition toward the main Avon Championships Circuit.

During the late 1970s and early 1980s, the tournament featured future champions like Hana Mandlikova and Kathleen Horvath competing on fast indoor surfaces. Played typically in January or February, the club's specialized indoor facilities to host high-level international play during the harsh Canadian winters.

The final edition concluded its run at the Montreal venue in 1982 with Glynis Coles securing the final singles championship over Leigh-Anne Thompson. Although it was discontinued shortly after, its history remains a key chapter in the development of the WTA's global reach and talent pipeline.

== Past finals ==
=== Singles ===
Year	Winner	Runner-up	Score
1978	(Czechoslovakia) Hana Strachoňová	(United States) Stephanie Tolleson	4–6, 6–1, 7–5
1979	(Czechoslovakia) Hana Mandlíková	(United States) Leslie Allen	7–6, 6–2
1981	(United States) Kathleen Horvath	(United States) Candy Reynolds	6–4, 7–6
1982	(United Kingdom) Glynis Coles	(United States) Leigh-Anne Thompson	6–4, 6–4

=== Doubles ===
Year	Winners	Runners-up	Score
1978	(United States) Pam Shriver (United States) Betsy Nagelsen	(United States) Ann Kiyomura (United States) Jane Stratton	6–1, 6–4
1979	(Canada) Marjorie Blackwood (Australia) Kym Ruddell	(Argentina) Raquel Giscafré (United States) Jane Stratton	6–4, 3–6, 6–4
1981	(United States) Carol Baily (United States) Candy Reynolds	(United States) Diane Desfor (United States) Barbara Hallquist	6–2, 6–3
1982	(Canada) Marjorie Blackwood (2) (Australia) Susan Leo	(United States) Diane Desfor (United States) Barbara Jordan	6–2, 6–4
