= Avon Futures of Calgary =

Defunct tennis tournament
- Tour: Avon Futures Circuit
- Sponsor: Avon Cosmetics Company
- Founded: 1980
- Abolished: 1980
- Editions: 1
- Location: Calgary, Canada
- Venue: Glenmore Racquet Ckub
- Category: Futures
- Surface: Carpet / indoor
- Draw: 32 S
- Prize money: $25,000

The Avon Futures of Calgary was a CTA/WTA affiliated indoor carpet court tennis tournament founded in 1980. It was played at the Glenmore Racquet Club, in Calgary, Canada for one edition when it was discontinued.

== History ==
The tournament was part of the Avon Futures Circuit, which served as a developmental "feeder" tour for the main Avon Championships Circuit. It provided up-and-coming players with the opportunity to earn points and qualify for the top-tier events.

It was staged for only one edition in 1980, and was going to continue but was discontinued due to low attendance turnout.

== Past finals ==
=== Singles ===
Year	Winner	Runner-up	Score
1980	(Czechoslovakia) Regina Maršíková	(Switzerland) Christiane Jolissaint	4–6, 7–6, 6–2

=== Doubles ===
Year	Winners	Runners-up	Score
1980	(Canada) Marjorie Blackwood (Australia) Pam Whytcross	(United States) Lesley Allen (United States) Dianne Morrison	7–5, 5–7, 6–4
