= Melissa Gurney =

American tennis player

- Country (sports): United States
- Born: June 24, 1969 (age 57) Palos Verdes, California
- Turned pro: 1984
- Retired: 1995
- Plays: Right-handed (two-handed backhand)
- Prize money: $185,616

Singles
- Career record: 85–76
- Career titles: 2
- Highest ranking: No. 17 (March 30, 1987)

Grand Slam singles results
- French Open: 3R (1988)
- Wimbledon: 3R (1986)
- US Open: 3R (1984, 1986)

Doubles
- Career record: 6–24
- Career titles: 0
- Highest ranking: No. 82 (December 21, 1986)

Melissa Gurney (born June 24, 1969) is a retired American professional tennis player.

== Career ==
Gurney won the US National 18 Hardcourts in 1984 and was ranked No. 2 nationally in the Girls' 16 singles in 1983. She turned professional in 1984 and joined the WTA Tour. In 1986, she won two consecutive singles titles, the Northern California Open and the Southern California Open. She reached a career-high ranking of No. 17 on March 30, 1987. She posted career victories over Andrea Jaeger, Dianne Balestrat, Mary Joe Fernández, Rosie Casals, and Kathy Jordan. She retired in 1995.

== WTA career finals ==
=== Singles: 4 (2 titles, 2 runner-ups) ===
Winner — Legend Grand Slam tournaments (0–0) WTA Championships (0–0) Virginia Slim (2–2)	Finals by surface Hard (2–2) Grass (0–0) Clay (0–0) Carpet (0–0)

Result	W-L	Date	Tournament	Surface	Opponent	Score
Win	1–0	Jul 1986	Berkeley Open	Hard	(United States) Barbara Gerken	6–1, 6–3
Win	2–0	Jul 1986	San Diego Open	Hard	(United States) Stephanie Rehe	6–2, 6–4
Loss	3–1	Oct 1986	VS Indianapolis	Hard (i)	(United States) Zina Garrison	3–6, 3–6
Loss	3–2	Jul 1987	Aptos Open	Hard	(United States) Elly Hakami	3–6, 4–6
