= 1983 Ginny Championships – Singles =

Singles
- 1983 Ginny Championships

Final
- Champion: (United States) Kathleen Horvath
- Runner-up: (Canada) Carling Bassett
- Score: 4–6, 6–2, 7–6^{(7–1)}

Details
- Draw: 15
- Seeds: 4

Events
Singles	Doubles
- Ginny Championships

In the inaugural edition of the tournament, Kathleen Horvath won the title by defeating Carling Bassett 4–6, 6–2, 7–6^{(7–1)} in the final.

== Seeds ==
Only the top seed received a bye to the quarterfinals.

1. (Canada) Carling Bassett (final)
2. (United States) Kathleen Horvath (champion)
3. (United States) Alycia Moulton (first round)
4. (South Africa) Yvonne Vermaak (semifinals)

== Draw ==
First round
(United Kingdom) A Hobbs	6	6
(South Africa) J Mundel	2	4
4	(South Africa) Y Vermaak	6	6
(Brazil) C Monteiro	3	3
(Sweden) C Jexell	4	4
(United States) J Harrington	6	6
(Czechoslovakia) M Skuherská	4	4
(United States) G Purdy	6	6
(United States) S Collins	6	6
3	(United States) A Moulton	4	4
(Australia) E Smylie	7	6
(United States) F Raschiatore	5	3
(Australia) A Minter	6	7	3
2	(United States) K Horvath	7	6	6

Quarterfinals
1	(Canada) C Bassett	6	3	6
(United Kingdom) A Hobbs	1	6	4
4	(South Africa) Y Vermaak	2	6	6
(United States) J Harrington	6	3	2
(United States) G Purdy	2	3
(United States) S Collins	6	6
(Australia) E Smylie	6^{4}	3
2	(United States) K Horvath	7^{7}	6

Semifinals
1	(Canada) C Bassett	6	6
4	(South Africa) Y Vermaak	4	1
(United States) S Collins	1	6	3
2	(United States) K Horvath	6	2	6

Final
1	(Canada) C Bassett	6	2	6^{1}
2	(United States) K Horvath	4	6	7^{7}
