= WTA 125 Circuit =

The WTA 125 Tour is the Women's Tennis Association's premier second tier developmental tennis circuit, acting as a direct bridge between the main WTA Tour and the lower-level ITF Women's World Tennis Tour. It was created in 2012 and the WTA uses several terms to describe it, including the WTA 125 Circuit.

== History ==
From 1974–1984 the WTA tried several iterations of a full-fledged mid-level tour, with limited success. In the 1974 WTA Satellite Tour was the inaugural second highest tier women's tennis tour made up of three subsidiary circuits, including the Virginia Slims Satellite circuit, covering the Arizona, California, Florida, Georgia, Texas, the USLTA Women's satellite circuit covering California and New England, the ILTF European satellite circuit covering Italy and Spain. The WTA and USTA jointly announced the introduction of a new secondary tier tour in late 1975. (Note: The current WTA 125 circuit is the modern iteration of a specific functional tier that the WTA has "owned" at various points since at least 1974-75)

In 1976 Gladys Heldman WTA and USTA founded the developmental Women's Futures Tennis Tour, and was mainly operated in Canada and the United States. It was initially a subsidiary tour of the Virginia Slims Circuit. By 1977 it became known as the Avon Futures Circuit.

In April 1978 it was announced that Avon already sponsoring the futures circuit would also take over the main tour the following season. In August 1978 the WTA met at the headquarters of Avon for the signing of contracts, and secured an increase in prize money for the futures circuit set up for developing players.

In 1979 it then became a subsidiary tour of the Avon Championships Circuit. (Note: The WTA's developmental framework was solidified during the 1979 sponsorship transition to Avon. While the Avon Championships served as the elite tour, the Avon Futures Circuit functioned as a formal second tier. With a dedicated $200,000 prize pool, the Futures circuit allowed lower-ranked players to earn ranking points and "graduate" to the main tour; for instance, finalists in a Futures event often earned a spot in the following week's main-draw Championship tournament. This "bridge" system reached its peak in 1980, providing a sanctioned, merit-based pathway that predates the modern WTA 125 series. See: King & Starr (1988), p. 162.) The tour ran alongside the main circuit as a qualifying competition for those tours, and provided a bridge on a promotion or relegation basis. There were between nine and eleven events in any particular season that culminated in an end of season finale called the Avon Futures Championships. The circuit ended in 1982 when prize money per event reached $40,000 or $137,000 by 2026 standards, and was replaced by the Ginny Circuit, (Note: On 27 April 1982 the WTA unveiled its plan for a year long world wide tour that would pour $20 million into women's tennis in the next two years. There was also a Ginny Circuit that would replace the Avon Futures as an opportunity for younger players to move up to the Formula One events based on performance.) that also had a season finale called the Ginny Championships. In 1984 the Ginny Circuit under auspices of WTA ended leaving no immediate replacement promotional pathway tour.

In 1985 the International Tennis Federation stepped in and created new promotional second and third tier tours called the ITF Women's Challenger Circuit, and ITF Women's Satellite Circuit. and to fill the gap left by ending of the Ginny Circuit. Since 1984 there had been only two levels of women's tennis; The main WTA Tour and the ITF Tour. The ITF had several levels within itself, but there was still only two tours and no actual bridging tour. The ITF Women's circuit remained the immediate level below the main WTA Tour until at least late 2012.

== WTA 125 creation ==
In November 2012 the WTA created a brand new second tier developmental event category by launching WTA 125 Tour, and at the time of the launch it consisted of only two tournaments. This new secondary tier was made to try and bridge the gap between the main WTA tour and the ITF tour. The ITF continues to be responsible for the third tier tour today called the ITF Women's World Tennis Tour. This secondary tour has multiple common names including WTA 125 Circuit, WTA 125 Tour, WTA 125k Series, and WTA Challenger Series.

As of 2025 there has been considerable growth in all aspects of the 125 tour. There are now over 50 tournaments in 20 countries with over 6 million in prize money.

== Partners ==
Included:

- Mercedes-Benz Group
- Public Investment Fund
- Corpay
- Morgan Stanley
- USANA Health Sciences
- Wilson Sporting Goods

== Prize money ==
In 2025 the WTA 125 Circuit had 50 events in 20 countries on 5 continents offering a total $6,000,000 in prize money.

== Sources ==
- We have come a long way : the story of women's tennis by (1988) King, Billie Jean; Starr, Cynthia
