= 1983 WTA Congoleum Classic – Doubles =

Doubles
- 1983 WTA Congoleum Classic

Final
- Champions: (United States) Kathy Jordan (United States) Ann Kiyomura
- Runners-up: (Australia) Dianne Fromholtz (Netherlands) Betty Stöve
- Score: 6–2, 6–2

Details
- Draw: 14
- Seeds: 4

Events
Singles	Doubles
WTA Congoleum Classic

Kathy Jordan and Ann Kiyomura won in the final 6–2, 6–2 against Dianne Fromholtz and Betty Stöve.

== Seeds ==
Champion seeds are indicated in bold text while text in italics indicates the round in which those seeds were eliminated. The top two seeded teams received byes into the quarterfinals.

1. (United States) Rosemary Casals / (United States) Sharon Walsh (semifinals)
2. (United States) **Kathy Jordan** / (United States) **Ann Kiyomura (champions)**
3. (United States) Sandy Collins / (Socialist Federal Republic of Yugoslavia) Mima Jaušovec (semifinals)
4. n/a

== Draw ==
=== Key ===
- Q = Qualifier
- WC = Wild card
- LL = Lucky loser
- Alt = Alternate
- ITF = ITF entry
- PR = Protected ranking
- SR = Special ranking
- SE = Special exempt
- JE = Junior exempt
- JR = Junior Accelerator Programme entrant
- CO = College Accelerator Programme entrant
- NG = Next Gen Accelerator Program entrant
- w/o = Walkover
- r = Retired
- d = Defaulted

First round
(United Kingdom) **S Barker** (United States) **W White**	**7**	**6**
(United States) T Holladay (South Africa) Y Vermaak	5	0
LL	(United States) I Norman (United States) L Wilcox	1	0
(South Korea) **D-H Lee** (Romania) **L Romanov**	**6**	**6**
(Australia) **D Fromholtz** (Netherlands) **B Stöve**	**6**	**6**
(United States) B Buckley (United States) B Bruning	2	2
(Brazil) **P Medrado** (Italy) **S Simmonds**	**6**	**6**
(United States) J Harrington (Spain) C Perea-Alcalá	1	4
(United States) B Hallquist (Australia) S Leo	6	5
3	(United States) **S Collins** (Socialist Federal Republic of Yugoslavia) **M Jaušovec**	**7**	**7**
(Netherlands) **M Mesker** (France) **C Vanier**	**6**	**6**
(Canada) C Bassett (United States) M Werdel	4	4

Quarterfinals
1	(United States) **R Casals** (United States) **S Walsh**	**6**	**6**
(United Kingdom) S Barker (United States) W White	1	1
(South Korea) D-H Lee (Romania) L Romanov	**6**	4	2
(Australia) **D Fromholtz** (Netherlands) **B Stöve**	4	**6**	**6**
(Brazil) P Medrado (Italy) S Simmonds	6	5
3	(United States) **S Collins** (Socialist Federal Republic of Yugoslavia) **M Jaušovec**	**7**	**7**
(Netherlands) M Mesker (France) C Vanier	5	2
2	(United States) **K Jordan** (United States) **A Kiyomura**	**7**	**6**

Semifinals
1	(United States) R Casals (United States) S Walsh	6	**6**	6
(Australia) **D Fromholtz** (Netherlands) **B Stöve**	**7**	3	**7**
3	(United States) S Collins (Socialist Federal Republic of Yugoslavia) M Jaušovec	2	**6**	0
2	(United States) **K Jordan** (United States) **A Kiyomura**	**6**	3	**6**

Final
(Australia) Dianne Fromholtz (Netherlands) Betty Stöve	2	2
2	(United States) **Kathy Jordan** (United States) **Ann Kiyomura**	**6**	**6**
