= Avon Futures of Idaho =

Defunct tennis tournament
- Event name: Futures of Boise (1977); Avon Futures of Boise (1979); Avon Futures of Idaho (1980-81)
- Tour: Avon Futures Circuit
- Sponsor: Avon Products
- Founded: 1977
- Abolished: 1980
- Editions: 3
- Location: Boise, Idaho, United States
- Venue: Boise Racquet & Swim Club
- Category: Futures
- Surface: Hard / indoor

The Avon Futures of Idaho was a USLTA/WTA affiliated indoor hard court tennis tournament founded in 1977 as the Futures of Boise. It was first played at the Boise Racquet and Swim Club, in Boise, Idaho, United States. The event ran annually until 1980 when it was discontinued.

== History ==
The Futures of Boise (later known as the Avon Futures of Idaho) served as a critical early-season stop on the women's developmental Avon Futures Circuit from the late 1970s through 1980. Established to provide up-and-coming players a platform to earn qualifying points for the elite Virginia Slims and Avon Championships, the event was held indoors on the hard courts of the Boise Racquet and Swim Club.

The tournament's transition in 1979 to the Avon Futures brand reflected a standardized era of sponsorship that helped professionalize the lower-tier circuit, offering a $25,000 purse that attracted international prospects and top American collegiate talent.

By 1980, the tournament had reached its peak visibility as the Avon Futures of Idaho before the circuit's structural reorganization consolidated many of these regional developmental stops.

== Past finals ==
=== Singles ===
| Year | Event | Winner | Runner-up | Score |
|---|---|---|---|---|
| 1977 | Futures of Boise | (Czechoslovakia) Regina Maršíková | (West Germany) Katja Ebbinghaus | 1–6, 6–4, 7–6 |
| 1979 | Avon Futures of Boise | (West Germany) Sylvia Hanika | (United States) Sherry Acker | 6–3, 6–2 |
| 1980 | Avon Futures of Idaho | (United States) Roberta McCallum | (South Africa) Rosalyn Fairbank | 6–4, 6–1 |

=== Doubles ===
| Year | Event | Winner | Runner-up | Score |
|---|---|---|---|---|
| 1977 | Futures of Boise | (United States) Mary Carillo / (United States) Lele Forood | (United States) Bunny Bruning / (United States) Sharon Walsh | 6–4, 4–6, 6–4 |
| 1979 | Avon Futures of Boise | (United States) Sherry Acker / (United States) Mary Carillo | (United States) Stephanie Tolleson / (United States) Valerie Ziegenfuss | 6–3, 6–2 |
| 1980 | Avon Futures of Idaho | (United States) Mary Carillo / (Romania) Florența Mihai | (United States) Diane Desfor / (United States) Barbara Hallquist | 6–1, 6–4 |

== Sources ==
- WTA Tour/Tournaments/Avon Future - Boise
