= Avon Futures Circuit =

Tennis tour

Details
- Duration: 1976–1982
- Edition: 1-8
- Tournaments: 41

Achievements (singles)

The Avon Futures Circuit was a women's professional second tier tennis tour founded by Gladys Heldman and administered by the Women's Tennis Association and USLTA that was founded in 1976 as the Women's Futures Tennis Tour, and was mainly operated in Canada and the United States. It was initially a subsidiary tour of the Virginia Slims Circuit. In 1979 it became a subsidiary tour of the Avon Championships Circuit. The tour ran alongside the main circuit as a qualifying competition for those tours, and provided a bridge on a promotion or relegation basis. There were between nine and eleven events in any particular season that culminated in an end of season finale called the Avon Futures Championships. The circuit ended in 1982 and was replaced by a smaller Ginny Circuit in 1983.

== History ==
Originally this circuit evolved out of the Virginia Slims Mini-Circuit a forerunner to the Avon Futures Circuit. On 1 February 1974 it was announced that a five satellite tournament series would be held in Florida at Ocala, Ft. Myers, Winter Haven, Pensacola and Seebring. (Note: The Virginia Slims Mini-Circuit was later expanded by a further five Aztec of, events throughout April to early May 1974 in California, Georgia and Texas.)

The circuit offered prize money of $3,000 per tournament provided by Barnett Bank of Florida with the USLTA providing players that were ranked outside the world top 32. The winners of each event then qualify to enter an event on the main Virginia Slims Circuit.

Officially the circuit was founded in February 1976 by Gladys Heldman at a press conference held on Ocala, Florida. At this conference she announced that the circuit would consist of nine events (eventually ten) offering $10,000 prize money each culminating in a circuit fiinale event, that would run in conjunction with the Virginia Slims Circuit.

Forty-five players were selected to play on the circuit with 1975 World Computer Rankings, and a further fifty-two with no ranking. Barnett Bank was the circuit sponsor for the first inaugural season.

Towards the end of 1976 it was announced that Avon Products Inc would become the main sponsor of this tour from January 1977 offering $200,000 across the ten event circuit. In April 1978 it was announced that Avon would also take over the main tour the following season.

This circuit ran until 1982 with event prize money rising as high $30,000 nearly on par with the Colgate Series. In 1983 it was replaced by the Ginny Circuit for two seasons only when Virginia Slims resumed sponsorship of the women's tour from Avon, eventually leading to the 1985 integration with the ITF.

In early 1985 the ITF launched its women's challenger series of tournaments, as part of ITF Women's Challenger Circuit to fill the gap left by the previous Ginny circuit. These events eventually evolved into ITF 100K tournaments by 2012, the same year the WTA then launched a higher category 125K Series of just two events.

By 2026 the current second tier tennis tour the WTA 125 Circuit consists of 50+ WTA 125 tournaments.

== Circuit finals ==
The seasonal circuit finales were held in Hilton Head, South Carolina from 1976 to 1977, then Atlanta, Georgia from 1978 to 1979, then Oklahoma City, Oklahoma in 1980, then Boise, Idaho in 1981, then Austin, Texas in 1982.

== Tournaments ==
- Avon Futures of Atlanta
- Avon Futures of Austin
- Avon Futures of Bakersfield
- Avon Futures of Boise
- Avon Futures of Calgary
- Avon Futures of California
- Avon Futures of Carolina
- Avon Futures of Central Pennsylvania
- Avon Futures of Columbus
- Avon Futures of Greenville
- Avon Futures of Hampton Roads
- Avon Futures of Idaho
- Avon Futures of Las Vegas
- Avon Futures of Long Island
- Avon Futures of Montreal
- Avon Futures of Mississauga
- Avon Futures of Nashville
- Avon Futures of Northern California
- Avon Futures of Ogden
- Avon Futures of Orlando
- Avon Futures of Portland
- Avon Futures of Puerto Rico
- Avon Futures of Roanoke
- Avon Futures of San Diego
- Avon Futures of South Florida
- Avon Futures of Southwest Florida
- Avon Futures of Tennessee
- Avon Futures of Toronto
- Avon Futures of Tucson
- Avon Futures of Utah
- Avon Futures of Westchester
- Avon Futures of Western Pennsylvania
- Futures of Atlanta
- Futures of Austin
- Futures of Boise
- Futures of Ft. Myers
- Futures of Jacksonville
- Futures of McAllen
- Futures of Midland
- Futures of Ocala
- Futures of Ohio
- Futures of Pensacola
- Futures of San Antonio
- Futures of St. Petersburg
- Futures of Tallahassee
- Futures of West Palm Beach
