= 1983 WTA Congoleum Classic – Singles =

Singles
- 1983 WTA Congoleum Classic

Final
- Champion: (South Africa) Yvonne Vermaak
- Runner-up: (Canada) Carling Bassett
- Score: 6–3, 7–5

Details
- Draw: 28
- Seeds: 8

Events
Singles	Doubles
WTA Congoleum Classic

Yvonne Vermaak won in the final 6–3, 7–5 against Carling Bassett.

== Seeds ==
A champion seed is indicated in bold text while text in italics indicates the round in which that seed was eliminated. The top four seeds received a bye to the second round.

1. (Czechoslovakia) Hana Mandlíková (quarterfinals)
2. (West Germany) Sylvia Hanika (quarterfinals)
3. (Socialist Federal Republic of Yugoslavia) Mima Jaušovec (second round)
4. (United States) Kathy Rinaldi (quarterfinals)
5. (United States) Kathy Jordan (semifinals)
6. (South Africa) **Yvonne Vermaak (champion)**
7. (United Kingdom) Sue Barker (first round)
8. (Canada) Carling Bassett (final)

== Draw ==
=== Key ===
- Q = Qualifier
- WC = Wild card
- LL = Lucky loser
- Alt = Alternate
- ITF = ITF entry
- PR = Protected ranking
- SR = Special ranking
- SE = Special exempt
- JE = Junior exempt
- JR = Junior Accelerator Programme entrant
- CO = College Accelerator Programme entrant
- NG = Next Gen Accelerator Program entrant
- w/o = Walkover
- r = Retired
- d = Defaulted

=== Final ===
Final
8	(Canada) Carling Bassett	3	5
6	(South Africa) **Yvonne Vermaak**	**6**	**7**

=== Section 1 ===
First round
(United States) L-A Thompson	**7**	1	1
(United States) **M L Piatek**	5	**6**	**6**
(Italy) **S Simmonds**	**6**	**7**
(Australia) S Leo	3	5
(United States) S Collins	2	3
8	(Canada) **C Bassett**	**6**	**6**
(Netherlands) **M Mesker**	**7**	**6**
(United States) B Hallquist	5	1
(United States) **A Kiyomura**	**6**	**6**
(South Korea) D-H Lee	2	1
(Romania) L Romanov	0	5
5	(United States) **K Jordan**	**6**	**7**

Second round
1	(Czechoslovakia) **H Mandlíková**	**6**	**6**
(United States) M L Piatek	0	2
(Italy) S Simmonds	1	4
8	(Canada) **C Bassett**	**6**	**6**
4	(United States) **K Rinaldi**	**6**	3	**6**
(Netherlands) M Mesker	1	**6**	2
(United States) A Kiyomura	1	2
5	(United States) **K Jordan**	**6**	**6**

Quarterfinals
1	(Czechoslovakia) H Mandlíková	3	r
8	(Canada) **C Bassett**	**6**
4	(United States) K Rinaldi	**6**	3	6
5	(United States) **K Jordan**	1	**6**	**7**

Semifinals
8	(Canada) **C Bassett**	**6**	6	**6**
5	(United States) K Jordan	1	**7**	4

=== Section 2 ===
First round
7	(United Kingdom) S Barker	**6**	6	4
(United States) **C Benjamin**	3	**7**	**6**
(United States) **M Torres**	**6**	**6**
(Australia) D Fromholtz	0	1
(Peru) L Arraya	1	1
(United States) **W White**	**6**	**6**
6	(South Africa) **Y Vermaak**	**6**	**6**
(France) C Vanier	2	1
(United States) **D Gilbert**	2	**6**	**6**
(Brazil) P Medrado	**6**	4	2
(Sweden) C Jexell	0	6
(United States) **J Harrington**	**6**	**7**

Second round
(United States) C Benjamin	1	6
(United States) **M Torres**	**6**	**7**
(United States) **W White**	3	**6**	**6**
3	(Socialist Federal Republic of Yugoslavia) M Jaušovec	**6**	3	3
6	(South Africa) **Y Vermaak**	**6**	**6**
(United States) D Gilbert	1	1
(United States) J Harrington	0	1
2	(West Germany) **S Hanika**	**6**	**6**

Quarterfinals
(United States) **M Torres**	**6**	**6**
(United States) W White	3	3
6	(South Africa) **Y Vermaak**	**6**	**6**
2	(West Germany) S Hanika	2	2

Semifinals
(United States) M Torres	4	3
6	(South Africa) **Y Vermaak**	**6**	**6**
