= Avon Futures of Atlanta =

Defunct tennis tournament
- Tour: Avon Futures Circuit
- Founded: 1974; 52 years ago
- Abolished: 1980; 46 years ago
- Editions: 4
- Location: Atlanta, Georgia (1974, 1977, 1979–80)
- Surface: Carpet / indoor (1977, 1978–79)

The Avon Futures of Atlanta was a USTA/Women's Tennis Association affiliated tournament founded in 1974 as the Aztec of Atlanta. The event was part of the Virginia Slims Mini Circuit, then later the Avon Futures Circuit. The tournament was held for two more editions in 1979 and 1980 then was discontinued.

== Finals ==
=== Singles ===
Year	Champions	Runners-up	Score
1974	(United States) Betsy Nagelsen	(United States) Ceci Martinez	6–3, 4–6, 6–4
1975-76	Not held		
1977	(United States) Mary Struthers	(United States) Laura duPont	6–2, 6–0
1978	Not held this season		
1979	(United States) Sherry Acker	(Brazil) Patricia Medrado	6–2, 7–6
1980	(United States) Kay McDaniel	(United States) Renee Richards	4–6, 6–4, 7–6

== Event Names ==
- Aztec of Atlanta (1974)
- Futures of Atlanta (1977)
- Avon Futures of Atlanta (1979–1980)
