= WTA Congoleum Classic =

Defunct tennis tournament
- Event name: WTA Congoleum Classic
- Tour: WTA Tour
- Founded: 1983
- Abolished: 1983
- Editions: 1
- Surface: Hard

The WTA Congoleum Classic is a defunct WTA Tour affiliated tennis tournament played in 1983. It was held in Palm Springs, California in the United States and played on outdoor hard courts.

== Finals ==
=== Singles ===
Year	Champions	Runners-up	Score
1983	(South Africa) Yvonne Vermaak	(Canada) Carling Bassett	6–3, 7–5

=== Doubles ===
Year	Champions	Runners-up	Score
1983	(United States) Kathy Jordan (United States) Ann Kiyomura	(Australia) Dianne Fromholtz (Netherlands) Betty Stöve	6–2, 6–2
