= Avon Futures of Hampton Roads =

Defunct tennis tournament
- Event name: Avon Futures of Roanoke (1980-81); Avon Futures of Hampton Roads (1982)
- Tour: Avon Futures Circuit
- Sponsor: Avon Inc
- Founded: 1980
- Abolished: 1982
- Editions: 3
- Location: Roanoke, Virginia (1980-81); Newport News, Virginia (1982)
- Venue: Roanoke Civic Center (1980-81); Deer Park Racquet Club (1982)
- Surface: Carpet / indoor

The Avon Futures of Hampton Roads was a USTA/WTA affiliated indoor carpet court tennis tournament founded in 1980 as the Avon Futures of Roanoke. It was first played at the Roanoke Civic Center, in Roanoke, Virginia, United States. The event ran annually when it was last played at the Deer Park Racquet Club in 1982 at Newport News when it was discontinued and succeeded by the Ginny of Central Virginia in 1983.

== History ==
The event evolved out of the earlier Avon Qualifier of Roanoke in 1979. In 1980 the Avon Futures of Roanoke was inaugurated as part of the Avon Futures Circuit.

After the 1981 edition, the tournament organizers moved the event roughly 230 miles east to the coast (Newport News/Hampton Roads) for the 1982 season it did not renew for the following year. In 1983 it was replaced by the Ginny of Central Virginia.

== Past finals ==
=== Singles ===
Year	Winner	Runner-up	Score
1980	(United States) Felicia Hutnick	(United States) Vicki Nelson-Dunbar	6–2, 7–5
1981	(United States) Renée Richards	(United States) Jane Stratton	7–5, 6–3
1982	(Czechoslovakia) Helena Suková	(Brazil) Patricia Medrado	6–2, 6–7, 6–0

=== Doubles ===
Year	Winners	Runners-up	Score
1980	(United States) Rita Agassi (United States) Susan Mascarin	(United States) Betsy Blaney (Netherlands) Mariette Pakker	6–1, 7–5
1981	(Netherlands) Marcella Mesker (Switzerland) Christiane Jolissaint	(Czechoslovakia) Katerina Scronska (Czechoslovakia) Marcella Skuherska	6–1, 3–6, 6–1
1982	(Netherlands) Marcella Mesker (United States) Carol Baily	(Romania) Lucia Romanov (France) Corinne Vanier	6–2, 6–1
