= 1991 Westchester Cup =

- Date: July 22–28
- Edition: 8th
- Category: Tier V
- Draw: 32S / 16D
- Prize money: $100,000
- Surface: Hard / outdoor
- Location: Westchester, New York, U.S
- Venue: Manhattanville College

Champions

Singles
- (France) Isabelle Demongeot

Doubles
- (South Africa) Rosalyn Fairbank-Nideffer / (South Africa) Lise Gregory
- Westchester Cup

The 1991 Westchester Cup was a women's tennis tournament played on outdoor hard courts at the Manhattanville College in Westchester, New York in the United States. It was the 9th and final edition of the event played in the state of New York since 1968 where it originated as the Madison Square Garden Challenge Trophy, the second played in Westchester, and was part of the Tier V series of the 1991 WTA Tour. The tournament was played from July 22 through July 28, 1991. Unseeded Isabelle Demongeot won the singles title and earned $18,000 first-prize money.

== Finals ==
=== Singles ===
(France) Isabelle Demongeot defeated (United States) Lori McNeil 6–4, 6–4

- It was Demongeot's only singles title of her career.

=== Doubles ===
(South Africa) Rosalyn Fairbank-Nideffer / (South Africa) Lise Gregory defeated (United States) Katrina Adams / (United States) Lori McNeil 7–5, 6–4
