= Northern California Open (tennis) =

Defunct tennis tournament
- Event name: Avon Futures of Northern California (1978); Avon Futures of Bakersfield (1980–81); Avon Futures of California (1982); Ginny of Bakersfield (1983); North Face Open (1986); California State Championships (1987); Northern California Open (1988)
- Tour: Avon Futures Circuit (1978–82); Virginia Slims World Championship Series (1986 –88)
- Founded: 1978
- Abolished: 1988
- Editions: 7
- Surface: Hard (1986–88)

The Northern California Open is a defunct WTA Tour affiliated women's outdoor hard court. tennis tournament. It was founded in 1978 as the Avon Futures of Northern California its sponsored name, and was played annually with breaks until 1988.

It was the successor event to the earlier Northern California Championships.

== History ==
This event was first founded as the Futures of Northern California as part of the Avon Futures Circuit that year. The event was not held in 1979. In 1980 it was moved to Bakersfield as the Futures of Bakersfield until 1981. In 1982 whilst still in the same location it was branded as the Futures of California @ Bakersfield.

In 1983 it then became part of the Ginny Circuit under the brand name Ginny of Bakersfield for one season only. It was not held again over the next two years. In 1986 it was moved to Berkeley as the Berkeley Open.

In 1987 now in Aptos, California the event was branded as the North Face Open (its sponsored name). In 1988 it was branded as the Northern California Open then was discontinued.

== Locations ==
It was first held the Bayside Racquet Club in San Carlos, California in 1978. From 1980 to 1983 it was held in Bakersfield, California. In 1986 the event was staged in Berkeley, California. From 1987 to 1988 its final two editions it was played in Aptos, California in the United States

== Finals ==
=== Singles ===
Year	Champions	Runners-up	Score
1986	(United States) Melissa Gurney	(United States) Barbara Gerken	6–1, 6–3
1987	(United States) Elly Hakami	(United States) Melissa Gurney	6–3, 6–4
1988	(United Kingdom) Sara Gomer	(United States) Robin White	6–4, 7–5

=== Doubles ===
Year	Champions	Runners-up	Score
1986	(United States) Beth Herr (United States) Alycia Moulton	(United States) Amy Holton (South Africa) Elna Reinach	6–1, 6–2
1987	(United States) Kathy Jordan (United States) Robin White	(United States) Lea Antonoplis (United States) Barbara Gerken	6–1, 6–0
1988	(South Africa) Lise Gregory (United States) Ronni Reis	(United States) Patty Fendick (Canada) Jill Hetherington	6–3, 6–4

== Event names ==
Official

- Futures of Northern California (1978)
- Futures of Bakersfield (1980–81)
- Futures of California (1982)
- Bakersfield Open (1983)
- Berkeley Open (1986)
- California State Championships (1987)
- Northern California Open (1988)

Sponsored

- Avon Futures of Northern California (1978)
- Avon Futures of Bakersfield (1980–81)
- Avon Futures of California (1982)
- Ginny of Bakersfield (1983)
- North Face Open (1986)

Tour

- WTA Northern California

== Sources ==
- WTA Results Archive
