= Virginia Slims of Tulsa =

Defunct tennis tournament
- Event name: VS of Tulsa
- Tour: WTA Tour
- Founded: 1986
- Abolished: 1986
- Editions: 1
- Surface: Hard - outdoor

The Virginia Slims of Tulsa was a women's hardcourt tennis tournament staged one time. It was a $75,000 prize money event as part of the Virginia Slims Circuit. It was played at the Shadow Mountain Racquet Club, Tulsa, Oklahoma, United States from 22 to 28 September 1986.

== History ==
Held only one time at the Shadow Mountain Racquet Club, Tulsa, Oklahoma, United States this event was the women's successor tournament to the earlier Tulsa Invitation a combined men's and women's event that ran from 1958 to 1975.

== Finals ==
=== Singles ===
Year	Winner	Finalist	Score
1986	(United States) Lori McNeil	(United States) Beth Herr	6–0, 6–1

== Sources ==
- https://www.oklahoman.com/story/news/1986/06/25/virginia-slims-to-add-tulsa-to-pro-circuit/62722650007/

== WTA Page ==
- https://www.wtatennis.com/tournament/438/tulsa/1986/overview
