= Ginny Purdy =

American tennis player

- Full name: Ginny Purdy-Paskoff
- Country (sports): United States
- Born: November 15, 1966 (age 59)
- Prize money: $59,421

Singles
- Career record: 33–38
- Career titles: 1 WTA
- Highest ranking: No. 40 (June 23, 1986)

Grand Slam singles results
- French Open: 1R (1984, 1985)
- Wimbledon: 1R (1984)
- US Open: 1R (1984)

Doubles
- Career record: 1–16

Grand Slam doubles results
- French Open: 1R (1984, 1985)
- Wimbledon: 1R (1984)

Ginny Purdy-Paskoff (born November 15, 1966) is a former professional tennis player from the United States.

== Biography ==
Purdy, who grew up in Indianapolis and attended North Central High School, began competing on the tour in 1983.

Aged 16, Purdy made two WTA Tour finals in her first season, while still a junior at high school. She was runner-up at her home tournament, the 1983 Virginia Slims Indianapolis Indoor, then won the 1983 Pittsburgh Open, as a lucky loser.

In 1984, she competed in the main draw of the French Open, Wimbledon and US Open.

From 1985 to 1989, she was at the University of Southern California and played collegiate tennis.

She continues to live in Indianapolis and is now a real estate agent.

== WTA Tour finals ==
=== Singles (1-1) ===
Result	Date	Tournament	Tier	Surface	Opponent	Score
Loss	February, 1983	Indianapolis, U.S.	Category 1+	Hard	(United Kingdom) Anne Hobbs	4–6, 7–6, 4–6
Win	March, 1983	Pittsburgh, U.S.	Category 1+	Carpet	(Brazil) Cláudia Monteiro	6–2, 7–5
