= Chris O'Neil =

Chris O'Neil or O'Neill may refer to:

- Chris O'Neil (tennis) (born 1956), Australian female tennis player
- Chris O'Neil (footballer) (born 1995), Scottish footballer
- Chris O'Neill (animator) (born 1990, also known as Oney or OneyNG), Irish animator and Internet personality
- Christopher O'Neill (born 1974), husband of Princess Madeleine of Sweden
- Christopher John O'Neill, American comedian and Broadway actor

== See also ==
- Chris O'Neal (born 1994), American actor
