= Lori McNeil =

American tennis player (born 1963)

- Country (sports): United States
- Residence: Houston, Texas, U.S.
- Born: December 18, 1963 (age 62) San Diego, California, U.S.
- Height: 1.70 m (5 ft 7 in)
- Turned pro: 1983
- Retired: 2002
- Plays: Right-handed (one handed-backhand)
- Prize money: $3,441,604

Singles
- Career record: 436–309
- Career titles: 10
- Highest ranking: No. 9 (July 4, 1988)

Grand Slam singles results
- Australian Open: QF (1987)
- French Open: 3R (1988, 1992, 1994)
- Wimbledon: SF (1994)
- US Open: SF (1987)

Doubles
- Career record: 605–335
- Career titles: 33
- Highest ranking: No. 4 (November 9, 1987)

Grand Slam doubles results
- Australian Open: F (1987)
- French Open: QF (1987, 1992, 1993)
- Wimbledon: SF (1987)
- US Open: SF (1995, 1996)

Mixed doubles
- Career titles: 1

Grand Slam mixed doubles results
- Australian Open: SF (1997)
- French Open: W (1988)
- Wimbledon: F (1994)
- US Open: QF (1992)

Lori McNeil (born December 18, 1963) is an American tennis coach and former top 10 player. McNeil was a singles semifinalist at the US Open in 1987 and Wimbledon in 1994, a women's doubles finalist at the Australian Open in 1987 with Zina Garrison and French Open mixed-doubles winner in 1988 with Jorge Lozano.

== Personal ==
McNeil was born the youngest of four siblings to mother Dorothy and father Charlie McNeil, who played professional football with the San Diego Chargers during the 1960s. Moving from San Diego to Houston, McNeil developed her tennis skills at MacGregor Park playground, a public facility in the Third Ward district. It was there she became close childhood friends with fellow future professional tennis player, Zina Garrison.

== Career ==
Lori McNeil attended Oklahoma State University for two years and played tennis for the Cowgirls, reaching the 1983 NCAA quarterfinals (losing to eventual champion Beth Herr from USC).

McNeil played on the WTA Tour for 19 years from 1983–2002. She won a total of ten singles titles and 33 doubles titles during her career. Her career-high world rankings were No. 9 in singles (in 1988) and No. 4 in doubles (in 1987).

In 1987, McNeil was awarded the WTA Most Improved Player of the Year.

McNeil is perhaps best remembered for her results against Steffi Graf. In 1992, she defeated Graf 7–6, 6–4 in the first round of the WTA Tour Championships, marking the first time since 1985 that Graf had lost in the opening round of a tournament. Then, in 1994, McNeil beat Graf 7–5, 7–6 (7-5) in the first round at Wimbledon, the first time in Grand Slam history that a defending champion had suffered a first-round loss in women's singles.This is widely considered as one of the biggest upsets in tennis history.

That year, McNeil went on to reach the semifinals at Wimbledon before losing to eventual-champion Conchita Martínez 3-6, 6-2, 10-8. This equalled McNeil's best-ever Grand Slam singles performance – she also reached the semifinals at the US Open in 1987 (after defeating six-time champion Chris Evert in the quarterfinals) where she lost to Graf 4-6, 6-2, 6-4.

Despite never winning a women's doubles Grand Slam title, she reached the quarterfinal stage or better on 22 occasions at major level, and won multiple WTA Tour doubles titles with many of the leading doubles players of the era, including Martina Navratilova, Gigi Fernández, Rennae Stubbs, Katrina Adams, Zina Garrison and Helena Suková.

From 2001-2004, McNeil coached former top-5 player Amanda Coetzer. Partnering together, coach and student reached the doubles quarterfinals of the 2002 Australian Open. In 2004 and 2008, McNeil was also Assistant Coach to the US Olympic tennis teams.

In 2006, McNeil was inducted into the ITA Hall of Fame.

== Grand Slam finals ==
=== Doubles: 1 (runner-up) ===
Result	Year	Championship	Surface	Partner	Opponents	Score
Loss	1987	Australian Open	Grass	(United States) Zina Garrison	(United States) Martina Navratilova (United States) Pam Shriver	6–1, 6–0

=== Mixed doubles: 4 (1 title, 3 runner-ups) ===
Result	Year	Championship	Surface	Partner	Opponents	Score
Loss	1987	French Open	Clay	(United States) Sherwood Stewart	(United States) Pam Shriver (Spain) Emilio Sánchez	6–3, 7–6^{(7–4)}
Win	1988	French Open	Clay	(Mexico) Jorge Lozano	(Netherlands) Brenda Schultz (Netherlands) Michiel Schapers	7–5, 6–2
Loss	1992	French Open	Clay	(United States) Bryan Shelton	(Spain) Arantxa Sánchez Vicario (Australia) Mark Woodforde	6–2, 6–3
Loss	1994	Wimbledon	Grass	(United States) T. J. Middleton	(Czech Republic) Helena Suková (Australia) Todd Woodbridge	3–6, 7–5, 6–3

== WTA Tour finals ==
=== Singles: 21 (10 titles, 11 runner-ups) ===
Legend Tier I (0–1) Tier II (1–0) Tier III (2–2) Tier IV (2–1) Tier V (3–2) Virginia Slims (2–5)	Finals by surface Hard (4–3) Grass (4–2) Clay (0–1) Carpet (2–5)

Result	W/L	Date	Tournament	Surface	Opponent	Score
Loss	0–1	Feb 1986	Oklahoma City, US	Carpet (i)	(Netherlands) Marcella Mesker	4–6, 6–4, 3–6
Loss	0–2	Jul 1986	Newport, US	Grass	(United States) Pam Shriver	4–6, 2–6
Win	1–2	Sep 1986	Tampa, US	Hard	(United States) Zina Garrison	2–6, 7–5, 6–2
Win	2–2	Sep 1986	Tulsa, US	Hard	(United States) Beth Herr	6–0, 6–1
Loss	2–3	Feb 1987	Oklahoma City, US	Hard	(Australia) Elizabeth Smylie	6–4, 3–6, 5–7
Loss	2–4	Mar 1987	Piscataway, US	Carpet (i)	(Czechoslovakia) Helena Suková	0–6, 3–6
Loss	2–5	Sep 1987	New Orleans, US	Carpet (i)	(United States) Chris Evert	3–6, 5–7
Win	3–5	Feb 1988	Oklahoma City, US	Carpet (i)	(Netherlands) Brenda Schultz	6–3, 6–2
Loss	3–6	May 1988	Geneva, Switzerland	Clay	(Austria) Barbara Paulus	4–6, 7–5, 1–6
Win	4–6	Jul 1988	Newport, US	Grass	(United States) Barbara Potter	6–4, 4–6, 6–3
Loss	4–7	Jan 1989	Tokyo, Japan	Carpet (i)	(United States) Martina Navratilova	7–6^{(7–3)}, 3–6, 6–7^{(5–7)}
Win	5–7	Aug 1989	Albuquerque, US	Hard	(South Africa) Elna Reinach	6–1, 6–3
Win	6–7	Feb 1991	Denver, US	Carpet (i)	(Netherlands) Manon Bollegraf	6–3, 6–4
Win	7–7	Apr 1991	Tokyo, Japan	Hard	(Belgium) Sabine Appelmans	2–6, 6–2, 6–1
Loss	7–8	Jul 1991	Westchester, US	Hard	(France) Isabelle Demongeot	4–6, 4–6
Loss	7–9	Feb 1992	Oklahoma City, US	Hard (i)	(United States) Zina Garrison	5–7, 6–3, 5–7^{(10)}
Win	8–9	Jun 1992	Eastbourne, UK	Grass	(United States) Linda Wild	6–4, 6–4
Win	9–9	Jun 1993	Birmingham, UK	Grass	(United States) Zina Garrison	6–4, 2–6, 6–3
Win	10–9	Jun 1994	Birmingham, UK	Grass	(United States) Zina Garrison	6–2, 6–2
Loss	10–10	Jun 1995	Birmingham, UK	Grass	(United States) Zina Garrison	3–6, 3–6
Loss	10–11	Nov 1995	Philadelphia, US	Carpet (i)	(Germany) Steffi Graf	1–6, 6–4, 3–6

=== Doubles: 64 (33 titles, 31 runner-ups) ===
Legend Grand Slam (0–1) Tier I (3–2) Tier II (4–8) Tier III (8–5) Tier IV (4–2) Tier V (4–3) Virginia Slims (10–10)	Finals by surface Hard (13–9) Grass (4–3) Clay (6–7) Carpet (10–12)

Result	No.	Date	Tournament	Surface	Partner	Opponents	Score
Win	1.	Sep 1983	Bakersfield	Hard	(United States) Kyle Copeland	(United States) Ann Henricksson (Brazil) Patricia Medrado	6–4, 6–3
Loss	1.	Apr 1985	Seabrook Island	Clay	(United States) Elise Burgin	(Soviet Union) Svetlana Parkhomenko (Soviet Union) Larisa Savchenko	1–6, 3–6
Win	2.	Oct 1985	Brighton	Carpet (i)	(France) Catherine Suire	(United States) Barbara Potter (Czechoslovakia) Helena Suková	4–6, 7–6^{(3)}, 6–4
Loss	2.	Feb 1986	Memphis	Carpet (i)	(France) Catherine Suire	(Netherlands) Marcella Mesker (France) Pascale Paradis	6–2, 6–7^{(1)}, 1–6
Loss	3.	Oct 1986	Zürich	Carpet (i)	(United States) Alycia Moulton	(West Germany) Steffi Graf (Argentina) Gabriela Sabatini	6–1, 4–6, 4–6
Win	3.	Oct 1986	Indianapolis	Hard (i)	(United States) Zina Garrison	(United States) Candy Reynolds (United States) Anne Smith	4–5 ret.
Win	4.	Nov 1986	San Juan	Hard	(Argentina) Mercedes Paz	(United States) Gigi Fernández (United States) Robin White	6–2, 3–6, 6–4
Win	5.	Dec 1986	Buenos Aires	Clay	(Argentina) Mercedes Paz	(Netherlands) Manon Bollegraf (Netherlands) Nicole Jagerman	6–1, 2–6, 6–1
Loss	4.	Jan 1987	Australian Open	Grass	(United States) Zina Garrison	(United States) Martina Navratilova (United States) Pam Shriver	1–6, 0–6
Loss	5.	Feb 1987	Memphis	Hard	(United States) Kim Sands	(Soviet Union) Svetlana Parkhomenko (Soviet Union) Larisa Savchenko	4–6, 4–6
Loss	6.	Mar 1987	Washington D.C.	Carpet (i)	(United States) Zina Garrison	(United States) Elise Burgin (United States) Pam Shriver	1–6, 6–3, 4–6
Win	6.	Mar 1987	Piscataway	Carpet (i)	(United States) Gigi Fernández	(United States) Betsy Nagelsen (Australia) Elizabeth Smylie	6–1, 6–4
Loss	7.	Apr 1987	Hilton Head	Clay	(United States) Zina Garrison	(Argentina) Mercedes Paz (West Germany) Eva Pfaff	6–7^{(6)}, 5–7
Loss	8.	Apr 1987	Houston	Clay	(United States) Zina Garrison	(United States) Kathy Jordan (United States) Martina Navratilova	2–6, 4–6
Win	7.	Jul 1987	Newport	Grass	(United States) Gigi Fernández	(United Kingdom) Anne Hobbs (United States) Kathy Jordan	7–6^{(5)}, 7–5
Loss	9.	Aug 1987	Los Angeles	Hard	(United States) Zina Garrison	(United States) Martina Navratilova (United States) Pam Shriver	3–6, 4–6
Win	8.	Aug 1987	Toronto	Hard	(United States) Zina Garrison	(West Germany) Claudia Kohde-Kilsch (Czechoslovakia) Helena Suková	6–1, 6–2
Win	9.	Aug 1987	Mahwah	Hard	(United States) Gigi Fernández	(United Kingdom) Anne Hobbs (Australia) Elizabeth Smylie	6–3, 6–2
Win	10.	Sep 1987	New Orleans	Carpet (i)	(United States) Zina Garrison	(United States) Peanut Louie Harper (United States) Heather Ludloff	6–3, 6–4
Loss	10.	Oct 1987	Filderstadt	Carpet (i)	(United States) Zina Garrison	(United States) Martina Navratilova (United States) Pam Shriver	1–6, 2–6
Loss	11.	Nov 1987	Chicago	Carpet (i)	(United States) Zina Garrison	(West Germany) Claudia Kohde-Kilsch (Czechoslovakia) Helena Suková	4–6, 3–6
Win	11.	Feb 1988	Dallas	Carpet (i)	(West Germany) Eva Pfaff	(United States) Gigi Fernández (United States) Zina Garrison	2–6, 6–4, 7–5
Win	12.	Feb 1988	San Antonio	Hard	(Czechoslovakia) Helena Suková	(South Africa) Rosalyn Fairbank (United States) Gretchen Magers	6–3, 6–7^{(5)}, 6–2
Win	13.	Apr 1988	Hilton Head	Clay	(United States) Martina Navratilova	(West Germany) Claudia Kohde-Kilsch (Argentina) Gabriela Sabatini	6–2, 2–6, 6–3
Loss	12.	Apr 1988	Houston	Clay	(United States) Martina Navratilova	(United States) Katrina Adams (United States) Zina Garrison	7–6^{(4)}, 2–6, 4–6
Loss	13.	Jul 1988	Newport	Grass	(United States) Gigi Fernández	(South Africa) Rosalyn Fairbank (United States) Barbara Potter	4–6, 3–6
Loss	14.	Oct 1988	New Orleans	Hard	(United States) Betsy Nagelsen	(United States) Beth Herr (United States) Candy Reynolds	4–6, 4–6
Win	14.	Oct 1988	Brighton	Carpet (i)	(United States) Betsy Nagelsen	(France) Isabelle Demongeot (France) Nathalie Tauziat	7–6^{(5)}, 2–6, 7–6^{(4)}
Win	15.	Nov 1988	Chicago	Carpet (i)	(United States) Betsy Nagelsen	(Soviet Union) Larisa Savchenko (Soviet Union) Natasha Zvereva	6–4, 3–6, 6–4
Loss	15.	Nov 1988	Adelaide	Hard	(Czechoslovakia) Jana Novotná	(West Germany) Sylvia Hanika (West Germany) Claudia Kohde-Kilsch	5–7, 7–6^{(4)}, 4–6
Win	16.	Feb 1989	Memphis	Hard (i)	(United States) Betsy Nagelsen	(United States) Elise Burgin (Australia) Elizabeth Smylie	w/o
Loss	16.	Mar 1989	Key Biscayne	Hard	(United States) Gigi Fernández	(Czechoslovakia) Jana Novotná (Czechoslovakia) Helena Suková	6–7^{(5)}, 4–6
Loss	17.	Apr 1989	Houston	Clay	(United States) Gigi Fernández	(United States) Katrina Adams (United States) Zina Garrison	3–6, 4–6
Win	17.	May 1989	Geneva	Clay	(United States) Katrina Adams	(Soviet Union) Larisa Savchenko (Soviet Union) Natasha Zvereva	2–6, 6–3, 6–4
Win	18.	Jul 1989	Newport	Grass	(United States) Gigi Fernández	(Australia) Elizabeth Smylie (Australia) Wendy Turnbull	6–3, 6–7^{(5)}, 7–5
Win	19.	Oct 1989	Brighton	Carpet (i)	(United States) Katrina Adams	(Australia) Hana Mandlíková (Czechoslovakia) Jana Novotná	4–6, 7–6^{(7)}, 6–4
Win	20.	Oct 1989	Indianapolis	Hard (i)	(United States) Katrina Adams	(West Germany) Claudia Porwik (Soviet Union) Larisa Savchenko	6–4, 6–4
Loss	18.	Feb 1991	Denver	Carpet (i)	(United States) Patty Fendick	(South Africa) Lise Gregory (United States) Gretchen Rush	4–6, 4–6
Win	21.	May 1991	Strasbourg	Clay	(United States) Stephanie Rehe	(Netherlands) Manon Bollegraf (Argentina) Mercedes Paz	6–7^{(2)}, 6–4, 6–4
Loss	19.	Jul 1991	Westchester	Hard	(United States) Katrina Adams	(South Africa) Rosalyn Fairbank (South Africa) Lise Gregory	5–7, 4–6
Win	22.	Sep 1991	Milan	Carpet (i)	(United States) Sandy Collins	(Belgium) Sabine Appelmans (Italy) Raffaella Reggi	7–6^{(0)}, 6–3
Loss	20.	Oct 1991	Zürich	Carpet (i)	(United States) Zina Garrison	(Czechoslovakia) Jana Novotná (Czechoslovakia) Andrea Strnadová	4–6, 3–6
Loss	21.	Oct 1991	Brighton	Carpet (i)	(United States) Zina Garrison	(United States) Pam Shriver (Soviet Union) Natasha Zvereva	1–6, 2–6
Win	23.	Feb 1992	Memphis	Hard (i)	(Australia) Nicole Provis	(United States) Katrina Adams (Netherlands) Manon Bollegraf	3–6, 6–4, 7–6^{(6)}
Loss	22.	May 1992	Strasbourg	Clay	(Argentina) Mercedes Paz	(United States) Patty Fendick (Czechoslovakia) Andrea Strnadová	3–6, 4–6
Win	24.	Jun 1992	Birmingham	Grass	(Australia) Rennae Stubbs	(United States) Sandy Collins (South Africa) Elna Reinach	5–7, 6–3, 8–6
Win	25.	Aug 1992	Montreal	Hard	(Australia) Rennae Stubbs	(United States) Gigi Fernández (Belarus) Natasha Zvereva	3–6, 7–5, 7–5
Loss	23.	Jan 1993	Sydney	Hard	(Australia) Rennae Stubbs	(United States) Pam Shriver (Australia) Elizabeth Smylie	6–7^{(4)}, 2–6
Loss	24.	Feb 1993	Tokyo	Carpet (i)	(Australia) Rennae Stubbs	(United States) Martina Navratilova (Czech Republic) Helena Suková	4–6, 3–6
Win	26.	Jun 1993	Birmingham	Grass	(United States) Martina Navratilova	(United States) Pam Shriver (Australia) Elizabeth Smylie	6–3, 6–4
Win	27.	Mar 1994	Hilton Head	Clay	(Spain) Arantxa Sánchez Vicario	(United States) Gigi Fernández (Belarus) Natasha Zvereva	6–4, 4–1 ret.
Win	28.	May 1994	Strasbourg	Clay	(Australia) Rennae Stubbs	(Argentina) Patricia Tarabini (Netherlands) Caroline Vis	6–3, 3–6, 6–2
Loss	25.	Mar 1995	Delray Beach	Hard	(Latvia) Larisa Neiland	(United States) Mary Joe Fernández (Czech Republic) Jana Novotná	4–6, 0–6
Loss	26.	Oct 1995	Brighton	Carpet (i)	(Czech Republic) Helena Suková	(United States) Meredith McGrath (Latvia) Larisa Neiland	5–7, 1–6
Win	29.	Oct 1995	Oakland	Carpet (i)	(Czech Republic) Helena Suková	(United States) Katrina Adams (United States) Zina Garrison	3–6, 6–4, 6–3
Win	30.	Nov 1995	Philadelphia	Carpet (i)	(Czech Republic) Helena Suková	(United States) Meredith McGrath (Latvia) Larisa Neiland	4–6, 6–3, 6–4
Loss	27.	Jan 1996	Sydney	Hard	(Czech Republic) Helena Suková	(United States) Lindsay Davenport (United States) Mary Joe Fernández	3–6, 3–6
Loss	28.	Feb 1996	Essen	Carpet (i)	(Czech Republic) Helena Suková	(United States) Meredith McGrath (Latvia) Larisa Neiland	6–3, 3–6, 2–6
Loss	29.	Jun 1996	Birmingham	Grass	(France) Nathalie Tauziat	(Australia) Elizabeth Smylie (United States) Linda Wild	3–6, 6–3, 1–6
Loss	30.	Nov 1996	Philadelphia	Carpet (i)	(United States) Nicole Arendt	(United States) Lisa Raymond (Australia) Rennae Stubbs	4–6, 6–3, 3–6
Win	31.	Oct 1998	Quebec City	Hard (i)	(United States) Kimberly Po	(United States) Chanda Rubin (France) Sandrine Testud	6–7^{(3)}, 7–5, 6–4
Win	32.	Feb 2001	Memphis	Hard (i)	(South Africa) Amanda Coetzer	(Chinese Taipei) Janet Lee (Indonesia) Wynne Prakusya	6–3, 2–6, 6–0
Loss	31.	May 2001	Strasbourg	Clay	(South Africa) Amanda Coetzer	(Italy) Silvia Farina Elia (Uzbekistan) Iroda Tulyaganova	1–6, 6–7^{(0)}
Win	33.	Sep 2001	Bahia	Hard	(South Africa) Amanda Coetzer	(United States) Nicole Arendt (Argentina) Patricia Tarabini	6–7^{(8)}, 6–2, 6–4

== Grand Slam performance timelines ==
Key
W	F	SF	QF	#R	RR	Q#	DNQ	A	NH

(W) winner; (F) finalist; (SF) semifinalist; (QF) quarterfinalist; (#R) rounds 4, 3, 2, 1; (RR) round-robin stage; (Q#) qualification round; (DNQ) did not qualify; (A) absent; (NH) not held; (SR) strike rate (events won / competed); (W–L) win–loss record.

=== Singles ===
Tournament	1981	1982	1983	1984	1985	1986	1987	1988	1989	1990	1991	1992	1993	1994	1995	1996	1997	1998	1999	Career SR
Australian Open	A	A	2R	LQ	1R	NH	QF	4R	1R	1R	3R	1R	2R	A	3R	2R	1R	A	A	0 / 12
French Open	A	A	A	2R	2R	1R	1R	3R	2R	1R	1R	3R	2R	3R	1R	A	1R	1R	A	0 / 14
Wimbledon	A	A	A	1R	1R	QF	2R	3R	4R	3R	3R	3R	2R	SF	1R	3R	1R	3R	A	0 / 15
US Open	LQ	A	LQ	4R	1R	1R	SF	3R	1R	2R	2R	3R	2R	1R	2R	1R	1R	2R	A	0 / 15
SR	0 / 0	0 / 0	0 / 1	0 / 3	0 / 4	0 / 3	0 / 4	0 / 4	0 / 4	0 / 4	0 / 4	0 / 4	0 / 4	0 / 3	0 / 4	0 / 3	0 / 4	0 / 3	0 / 0	0 / 56
Year-end ranking	NR	NR	148	97	93	14	11	13	37	52	19	15	25	17	34	83	305	91	869	

=== Doubles ===
Tournament	1983	1984	1985	1986	1987	1988	1989	1990	1991	1992	1993	1994	1995	1996	1997	1998	1999	2000	2001	2002	Career SR
Australian Open	2R	1R	1R	NH	F	A	QF	3R	3R	3R	QF	A	QF	1R	3R	A	A	A	A	QF	0 / 13
French Open	A	1R	2R	1R	QF	3R	2R	3R	1R	QF	QF	3R	1R	A	2R	2R	A	1R	1R	2R	0 / 17
Wimbledon	A	2R	1R	1R	SF	QF	QF	3R	QF	QF	QF	3R	QF	2R	3R	3R	1R	2R	3R	2R	0 / 19
US Open	A	2R	3R	3R	QF	QF	1R	QF	3R	QF	QF	A	SF	SF	1R	1R	2R	3R	2R	1R	0 / 18
SR	0 / 1	0 / 4	0 / 4	0 / 3	0 / 4	0 / 3	0 / 4	0 / 4	0 / 4	0 / 4	0 / 4	0 / 2	0 / 4	0 / 3	0 / 4	0 / 3	0 / 2	0 / 3	0 / 3	0 / 4	0 / 67
Year-end ranking		72	33	28	4	10	16	22	19	14	12	15	15	13	37	50	95	58	29	89	

=== Mixed doubles ===
Tournament	1986	1987	1988	1989	1990	1991	1992	1993	1994	1995	1996	1997	1998	1999	2000	2001	2002	Career SR
Australian Open	NH	QF	1R	A	1R	1R	1R	A	A	QF	2R	SF	A	A	A	A	1R	0 / 9
French Open	1R	F	W	1R	1R	1R	F	2R	3R	2R	A	2R	QF	A	A	A	A	1 / 12
Wimbledon	A	1R	QF	SF	3R	1R	SF	2R	F	3R	3R	3R	2R	1R	2R	2R	A	0 / 15
US Open	1R	2R	1R	A	1R	1R	QF	1R	A	1R	1R	1R	A	A	1R	A	A	0 / 11
SR	0 / 2	0 / 4	1 / 4	0 / 2	0 / 4	0 / 4	0 / 4	0 / 3	0 / 2	0 / 4	0 / 3	0 / 4	0 / 2	0 / 1	0 / 2	0 / 1	0 / 1	1 / 47
