= Ginny Championships =

Defunct tennis tournament
- Tour: WTA Tour
- Founded: 1983
- Abolished: 1984
- Editions: 2
- Location: Honolulu, Hawaii, U.S. Port St. Lucie, Florida, U.S.
- Category: Ginny Circuit
- Surface: Carpet / indoor

The Virginia Slims Ginny Championships was a women's tennis tournament held in the United States in 1983 and 1984. It was a continuation of a format started with the Avon Futures Championships that ran from 1976 to 1982. It was played on indoor carpet courts and was the final to the preceding eight tournaments of the Ginny Circuit. The winners and finalists of the Ginny Circuit tournaments qualified for the championships. The circuit was aimed at up-and-coming players who were targeting entry into the top-ranks of women's tennis. The first edition of the championships was held in Honolulu, Hawaii and the second in Port St. Lucie, Florida. The total prize money for both editions was $100,000. The tournament ended after two editions because the Ginny Circuit was merged with the 1985 Virginia Slims World Championship Series.

== Past finals ==
=== Singles ===
Year	Champions	Runners-up	Score
1983	(United States) Kathleen Horvath	(Canada) Carling Bassett	4–6, 6–2, 7–6^{(7–1)}
1984	(Sweden) Catarina Lindqvist	(United States) Terry Holladay	6–3, 6–1

=== Doubles ===
Year	Champions	Runners-up	Score
1983	(South Africa) Rosalyn Fairbank (United States) Candy Reynolds	(United States) Lea Antonoplis (United States) Barbara Jordan	5–7, 7–5, 6–3
1984	(United States) Betsy Nagelsen (United States) Paula Smith	(Switzerland) Christiane Jolissaint (Netherlands) Marcella Mesker	6–4, 6–1

== See also ==
- List of tennis tournaments
