= Avon Futures Championships =

Defunct tennis tournament
- Tour: Avon Futures Circuit
- Founded: 1976; 50 years ago
- Abolished: 1992; 34 years ago
- Location: Hilton Head, South Carolina (1976- )
- Venue: Various
- Surface: Clay / outdoor
- Draw: 32 S
- Prize money: s50,000 (1982)

The Avon Futures Championships was a Women's Tennis Association/USTA affiliated tournament founded in 1976 as the Futures Championship. They were the seasonal finales of the Avon Futures Circuit that were held in Hilton Head, South Carolina from 1976 to 1977, then Atlanta, Georgia from 1978 to 1979, then Oklahoma City, Oklahoma in 1980, then Boise, Idaho in 1981, then Austin, Texas in 1982 when they were discontinued.

== Event Names ==
- Futures Championship (1976–1977)
- Avon Futures Championships (1978–1982)
