= 1984 Virginia Slims of Indianapolis =

- Date: January 30 – February 5
- Edition: 4th
- Category: Ginny Circuit
- Draw: 32S / 16D
- Prize money: $50,000
- Surface: Carpet / indoor
- Location: Indianapolis, Indiana, U.S.
- Venue: Indianapolis Racquet Club

Champions

Singles
- (United States) JoAnne Russell

Doubles
- (Brazil) Cláudia Monteiro / (South Africa) Yvonne Vermaak
- Virginia Slims of Indianapolis

The 1984 Virginia Slims of Indianapolis, also known as the Ginny of Indianapolis, was a women's tennis tournament played on indoor carpet courts at the Indianapolis Racquet Club in Indianapolis in the United States that was part of the Ginny Tournament Circuit (Note: The 1984 Ginny Tournament Circuit consisted of eight $50,000 events played between February and September, followed by a $150,000 Ginny Championships in January 1985. All tournaments were held in the United States) of the 1983 Virginia Slims World Championship Series. The tournament was held from January 30 through February 5, 1984. JoAnne Russell won the singles title.

== Finals ==
=== Singles ===
(United States) JoAnne Russell defeated (United States) Pascale Paradis 7–6, 6–2

- It was Russell's 1st singles title of the year and of her career.

=== Doubles ===
(Brazil) Cláudia Monteiro / (South Africa) Yvonne Vermaak defeated (South Africa) Beverly Mould / (Australia) Elizabeth Smylie 6–4, 6–7, 7–5

- It was Monteiro's 1st title of the year and the 4th of her career. It was Vermaak's 1st title of the year and the 5th of her career.
