= Rosalyn Fairbank =

South African tennis player

- Full name: Rosalyn Doris Fairbank-Nideffer
- Country (sports): South Africa; United States
- Born: 2 November 1960 (age 65) Durban, South Africa
- Height: 1.73 m (5 ft 8 in)
- Plays: Right-handed (one handed-backhand)
- Prize money: US$ 1,639,135

Singles
- Career record: 383–320
- Career titles: 1
- Highest ranking: No. 15 (16 April 1990)

Grand Slam singles results
- Australian Open: 3R (1982, 1983, 1990, 1991, 1992)
- French Open: 4R (1985)
- Wimbledon: QF (1988, 1989)
- US Open: 4R (1982, 1989)

Doubles
- Career record: 417–260
- Career titles: 19
- Highest ranking: No. 12 (21 December 1986)

Grand Slam doubles results
- Australian Open: QF (1983)
- French Open: W (1981, 1983)
- Wimbledon: SF (1981)
- US Open: F (1983)

Grand Slam mixed doubles results
- French Open: F (1986)

Rosalyn Doris Fairbank-Nideffer (born 2 November 1960) is a retired professional tennis player from South Africa. She played her first grand slam in 1979, with her last appearance in 1997. She won a WTA Tour singles event in Richmond in 1983 and numerous doubles titles, with the highlight being her Grand Slam titles at the 1981 French Open with Tanya Harford and 1983 with Candy Reynolds. She won 317 singles and 472 doubles matches on the tour during her career. Later on in her career she married her American sports-psychologist Bob Nideffer, and changed her nationality to compete for the United States.

== Grand Slam finals ==
=== Doubles: 3 (2 titles, 1 runner-up) ===
Result	Year	Championship	Surface	Partner	Opponents	Score
Win	1981	French Open	Clay	(South Africa) Tanya Harford	(United States) Candy Reynolds (United States) Paula Smith	6–1, 6–3
Win	1983	French Open	Clay	(United States) Candy Reynolds	(United States) Kathy Jordan (United States) Anne Smith	5–7, 7–5, 6–2
Loss	1983	U.S. Open	Hard	(United States) Candy Reynolds	(United States) Martina Navratilova (United States) Pam Shriver	6–7, 6–1, 6–3

=== Mixed doubles: 1 (1 runner-up) ===
Result	Year	Championship	Surface	Partner	Opponents	Score
Loss	1986	French Open	Clay	(Australia) Mark Edmondson	(United States) Ken Flach (United States) Kathy Jordan	3–6, 7–6, 6–3

== WTA career finals ==
=== Singles: 1 (1 title, 2 runner-ups) ===
Result	W/L	Date	Tournament	Surface	Opponent	Score
Loss	0–1	Dec 1979	Sydney, Australia	Grass	(United Kingdom) Sue Barker	0–6, 5–7
Loss	0–2	Jun 1982	Birmingham, UK	Grass	(United States) Billie Jean King	2–6, 1–6
Win	1–2	Sep 1983	Richmond, US	Carpet	(United States) Kathy Jordan	6–4, 5–7, 6–4

=== Doubles: 43 (19 titles, 24 runner-ups) ===
Result	W/L	Date	Tournament	Surface	Partner	Opponents	Score
Win	1–0	May 1981	Lugano, Switzerland	Clay	(South Africa) Tanya Harford	(United States) Candy Reynolds (United States) Paula Smith	2–6, 6–1, 6–4
Win	2–0	May 1981	Berlin, West Germany	Clay	(South Africa) Tanya Harford	(United Kingdom) Sue Barker (Czechoslovakia) Renáta Tomanová	6–3, 6–4
Win	3–0	Jun 1981	French Open	Clay	(South Africa) Tanya Harford	(United States) Candy Reynolds (United States) Paula Smith	6–1, 6–3
Loss	3–1	Feb 1983	Indianapolis, U.S.	Hard (i)	(United States) Candy Reynolds	(United States) Lea Antonoplis (United States) Kathy Jordan	7–5, 4–6, 5–7
Win	4–1	Mar 1983	Nashville, U.S.	Hard	(United States) Candy Reynolds	(United States) Alycia Moulton (United States) Paula Smith	6–4, 7–6
Win	5–1	Apr 1983	Amelia Island, U.S.	Clay	(United States) Candy Reynolds	(Czechoslovakia) Hana Mandlíková (Romania) Virginia Ruzici	6–4, 6–2
Win	6–1	Jun 1983	French Open	Clay	(United States) Candy Reynolds	(United States) Kathy Jordan (United States) Anne Smith	5–7, 7–5, 6–2
Loss	6–2	Aug 1983	Canadian Open	Hard	(United States) Candy Reynolds	(United Kingdom) Anne Hobbs (United States) Andrea Jaeger	4–6, 7–5, 5–7
Loss	6–3	Aug 1983	Mahwah, U.S.	Hard	(United States) Candy Reynolds	(United Kingdom) Jo Durie (United States) Sharon Walsh	6–4, 5–7, 3–6
Loss	6–4	Sep 1983	US Open	Hard	(United States) Candy Reynolds	(United States) Martina Navratilova (United States) Pam Shriver	7–6, 1–6, 3–6
Win	7–4	Sep 1983	Richmond, U.S.	Carpet (i)	(United States) Candy Reynolds	(United States) Kathy Jordan (United States) Barbara Potter	6–7, 6–2, 6–1
Win	8–4	Nov 1983	Ginny Championships, US	Carpet (i)	(United States) Candy Reynolds	(United States) Lea Antonoplis (United States) Kathy Jordan	5–7, 7–5, 6–3
Loss	8–5	Mar 1984	Palm Beach, U.S.	Clay	(United States) Candy Reynolds	(United States) Betsy Nagelsen (United States) Anne White	6–2, 2–6, 2–6
Win	9–5	May 1984	Johannesburg, South Africa	Clay	(South Africa) Beverly Mould	(United States) Sandy Collins (United States) Andrea Leand	7–5, 7–5
Loss	9–6	Feb 1985	Oakland, US	Carpet (i)	(United States) Candy Reynolds	(Czechoslovakia) Hana Mandlíková (Australia) Wendy Turnbull	6–4, 5–7, 1–6
Win	10–6	Apr 1985	Hilton Head, US	Clay	(United States) Pam Shriver	(Soviet Union) Svetlana Parkhomenko (Soviet Union) Larisa Savchenko	6–4, 6–1
Win	11–6	Apr 1985	Amelia Island, US	Clay	(Czechoslovakia) Hana Mandlíková	(Canada) Carling Bassett (United States) Chris Evert-Lloyd	6–1, 2–6, 6–2
Loss	11–7	Apr 1985	San Diego, US	Hard	(Australia) Susan Leo	(United States) Candy Reynolds (Australia) Wendy Turnbull	4–6, 0–6
Loss	11–8	Sep 1985	Utah, US	Carpet	(South Africa) Beverly Mould	(Soviet Union) Svetlana Parkhomenko (Soviet Union) Larisa Neiland	5–7, 2–6
Loss	11–9	Oct 1985	Fort Lauderdale, US	Hard	(South Africa) Beverly Mould	(United States) Gigi Fernández (United States) Robin White	2–6, 5–7
Loss	11–10	Nov 1985	Sydney, Australia	Grass	(United States) Candy Reynolds	(Czechoslovakia) Hana Mandlíková (Australia) Wendy Turnbull	6–3, 6–7, 4–6
Win	12–10	Jun 1986	Birmingham, England	Grass	(United States) Elise Burgin	(Australia) Liz Smylie (Australia) Wendy Turnbull	6–2, 6–4
Loss	12–11	Aug 1986	San Diego, US	Hard	(United States) Elise Burgin	(United States) Beth Herr (United States) Alycia Moulton	7–5, 2–6, 4–6
Win	13–11	Sep 1986	Tampa, US	Hard	(United States) Elise Burgin	(United States) Gigi Fernández (United States) Kim Sands	7–5, 6–2
Loss	13–12	May 1987	Tampa, U.S.	Clay	(United States) Elise Burgin	(United States) Chris Evert (Australia) Wendy Turnbull	4–6, 3–6
Loss	13–13	Jun 1987	Eastbourne, UK	Grass	(Australia) Elizabeth Smylie	(Soviet Union) Svetlana Parkhomenko (Soviet Union) Larisa Savchenko	6–7^{(6–8)}, 6–4, 5–7
Win	14–13	Nov 1987	Worcester, US	Carpet	(United States) Elise Burgin	(West Germany) Bettina Bunge (West Germany) Eva Pfaff	6–4, 6–4
Loss	14–14	Feb 1988	San Antonio, US	Hard	(United States) Gretchen Magers	(United States) Lori McNeil (Czechoslovakia) Helena Suková	3–6, 7–6^{(7–5)}, 2–6
Win	15–14	Jul 1988	Newport, US	Grass	(United States) Barbara Potter	(United States) Gigi Fernández (United States) Lori McNeil	6–4, 6–3
Win	16–14	Sep 1988	Phoenix, US	Hard	(United States) Elise Burgin	(United States) Beth Herr (United States) Terry Phelps	6–7, 7–6, 7–6
Loss	16–15	Oct 1988	Nashville, US	Hard	(United States) Elise Burgin	(Australia) Jenny Byrne (Australia) Janine Tremelling	5–7, 7–6, 4–6
Loss	16–16	Mar 1989	Indian Wells, US	Hard	(United States) Gretchen Magers	(Australia) Hana Mandlíková (United States) Pam Shriver	3–6, 7–6, 3–6
Loss	16–17	Apr 1989	Tampa, U.S.	Clay	(United States) Elise Burgin	(Netherlands) Brenda Schultz (Hungary) Andrea Temesvári	6–7, 4–6
Win	17–17	Aug 1989	San Diego, U.S.	Hard	(United States) Elise Burgin	(United States) Gretchen Magers (United States) Robin White	4–6, 6–3, 6–3
Loss	17–18	Sep 1989	Phoenix, U.S.	Hard	(United States) Elise Burgin	(United States) Penny Barg (United States) Mareen Louie-Harper	6–7, 6–7
Loss	17–19	Sep 1989	Dallas, US	Carpet (i)	(United States) Elise Burgin	(United States) Mary Joe Fernández (United States) Betsy Nagelsen	6–7, 3–6
Loss	17–20	Nov 1989	Worcester, U.S.	Carpet (i)	(United States) Elise Burgin	(United States) Martina Navratilova (United States) Pam Shriver	4–6, 6–4, 4–6
Loss	17–21	Aug 1990	San Diego, U.S.	Hard	(United States) Elise Burgin	(United States) Patty Fendick (United States) Zina Garrison	4–6, 6–7
Loss	17–22	Nov 1990	Oakland, US	Carpet (i)	(United States) Robin White	(United States) Meredith McGrath (United States) Anne Smith	6–2, 0–6, 4–6
Win	18–22	Jul 1991	Westchester, US	Hard	(South Africa) Lise Gregory	(United States) Katrina Adams (United States) Lori McNeil	7–5, 6–4
Win	19–22	Jan 1992	Auckland	Hard	(Italy) Raffaella Reggi	(Canada) Jill Hetherington (United States) Kathy Rinaldi	1–6, 6–1, 7–5
Loss	19–23	Nov 1992	Oakland, US	Carpet	(United States) Gretchen Magers	(United States) Gigi Fernández (Commonwealth of Independent States) Natalia Zvereva	6–3, 2–6, 4–6
Loss	19–24	Jun 1996	Eastbourne, UK	Grass	(United States) Pam Shriver	(Czech Republic) Jana Novotná (Spain) Arantxa Sánchez Vicario	6–4, 5–7, 4–6
