= Marjorie Blackwood =

Canadian tennis player (born 1957)

- Full name: Marjorie Blackwood-Schelling
- Country (sports): Canada
- Born: 1 May 1957 (age 68) Karachi, Pakistan
- Prize money: US$ 60,617

Singles
- Career record: -

Grand Slam singles results
- Australian Open: 3R (1981)
- French Open: 1R (1978)
- Wimbledon: 3R (1982)
- US Open: 2R (1981)

Doubles
- Career record: -

Grand Slam doubles results
- Australian Open: 3R (1981)
- French Open: QF (1980)
- Wimbledon: QF (1981, 82)
- US Open: 2R (1981)

Marjorie Blackwood-Schelling (born 1 May 1957) is a Canadian retired tennis player. Partnering the Australian Susan Leo, she reached the doubles quarter-finals at Wimbledon in 1981 and 1982, and with Pam Whytcross, also Australian, the French Open in 1980. She was the coach/captain of the Canadian Federation Cup team in 1983.

She was Tennis Canada's 1982 female player of the year.

Born to a Canadian government officer in Karachi, she grew up in Detroit and Ottawa and attended the University of Texas.

After her retirement, she and her husband Peter Schelling were tennis directors at Whistler Tennis Club. They continue to coach in the Gulf Islands.

She was inducted into the Lisgar Collegiate Institute Athletic Wall of Fame in 2018.
