= Carling Bassett-Seguso =

Canadian tennis player

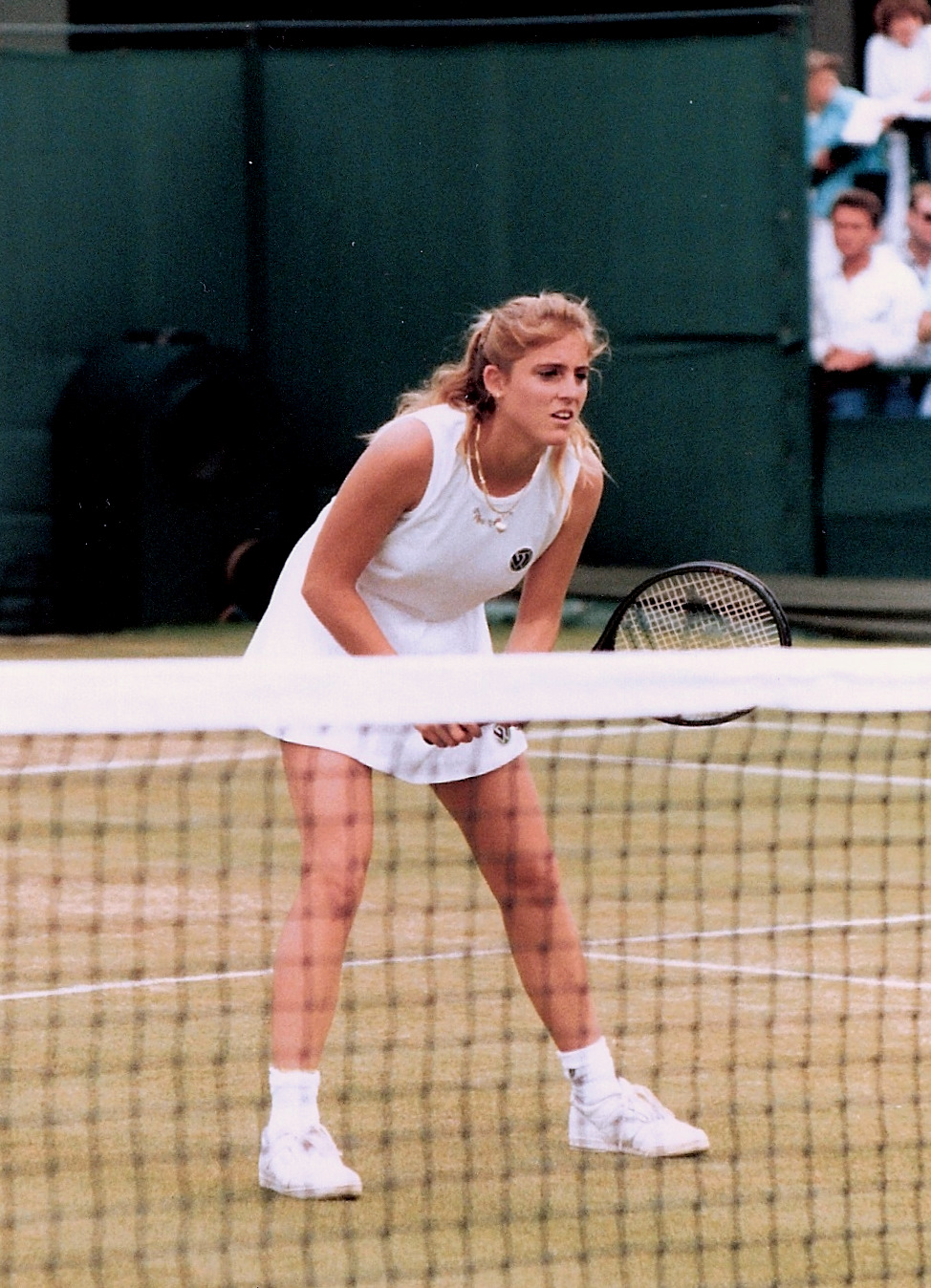
- Bassett-Seguso in 1987
- Country (sports): Canada
- Residence: Boca Raton, Florida, U.S.
- Born: 9 October 1967 (age 58) Toronto, Ontario, Canada
- Height: 1.68 m (5 ft 6 in)
- Turned pro: 3 January 1983
- Retired: 1988
- Plays: Right-handed (two-handed backhand)
- Prize money: US$ 687,862

Singles
- Career record: 168–112
- Career titles: 2 WTA
- Highest ranking: No. 8 (4 March 1985)

Grand Slam singles results
- Australian Open: QF (1983)
- French Open: QF (1984, 1986)
- Wimbledon: 4R (1983, 1986)
- US Open: SF (1984)

Other tournaments
- Olympic Games: 1R (1988)

Doubles
- Career record: 77–79
- Career titles: 2 WTA
- Highest ranking: No. 51 (19 January 1987)

Grand Slam doubles results
- Australian Open: QF (1984)
- French Open: 3R (1987)
- Wimbledon: 2R (1983, 1984, 1985, 1987)
- US Open: QF (1985)

Other doubles tournaments
- Olympic Games: QF (1988)

Grand Slam mixed doubles results
- Australian Open: 2R (1987)
- French Open: QF (1983)
- Wimbledon: 3R (1984)
- US Open: 2R (1986, 1988)

Carling Kathrin Bassett-Seguso (born 9 October 1967) is a Canadian former professional tennis player, fashion model and actress. Bassett is the daughter of John F. Bassett and Susan Carling, and the granddaughter of media baron John W. H. Bassett and politician and brewery executive John Carling. She was inducted into the Ontario Sports Hall of Fame in 2003.

== Tennis career ==
In 1981, Bassett won the Canadian junior indoor tennis title. In 1982, she was ranked No. 2 junior player in the world, after winning events in Tokyo and Taipei. That year, she also became the youngest winner of the Canadian closed championship at the age of 14. She won the title again in 1983 and in 1986. By age 16, Bassett was Canada's top tennis player. At the same time, she had a successful second career as a fashion model, working for the world-famous Ford modeling agency. She also dabbled in acting, being promoted as one of the stars of a 1982 teen comedy film Spring Fever, and later appearing in a 1984 episode of The Littlest Hobo.

In 1983, Bassett advanced to the quarter-finals of the Australian Open and won her first top-level singles titles in Pennsylvania. In 1984, she reached the quarterfinals at the French Open and, in her best performance at a Grand Slam, the semi-finals at the US Open where she defeated Elizabeth Smylie, Pascale Paradis, Mima Jaušovec, Petra Delhees and Hana Mandlíková before losing to Chris Evert. She reached the French Open quarterfinals again in 1986. Bassett won her second top-level singles title in 1987 at Strasbourg.

Bassett was named the WTA's Most Impressive Newcomer in 1983, and Canada's Female Athlete of the Year in 1983 and 1985. During her career, Bassett won a total of two top-level singles titles and two doubles titles.

== Personal life ==
Following her tennis career, Bassett admitted she had struggled for years with the eating disorder bulimia. "It becomes part of your life, like smoking," she told People Magazine in 1992. "Or it's like being an alcoholic. It's so easy to get into and so hard to get out of. I hated myself that I couldn't stop."

Bassett married American tennis player Robert Seguso in 1987. The couple have two sons and three daughters – Holden John Seguso, born 14 March 1988, daughter Carling Jr., born in 1990, Ridley Jack, born in 1993, Lennon Shy on 10 April 2010 and the youngest, Theodora. Holden has played in a handful of Futures tennis tournaments, off and on, since 2005.

On Monday, 13 August 2007, during the Canadian Open Tennis Championships at the Rexall Centre in Toronto, Bassett, along with John McEnroe, was inducted into the Canadian Tennis Hall of Fame. After the ceremony, Bassett teamed up with US tennis great Jim Courier for a friendly doubles match against McEnroe and Anna Kournikova.

== WTA career finals ==
=== Singles: 6 (2 titles, 4 runner-ups) ===
Winner – Legend Grand Slam tournaments (0–0) WTA Tour Championships (0–0) Virginia Slims (2–4)	Finals by surface Hard (0–2) Grass (0–0) Clay (1–1) Carpet (1–1)

Result	W/L	Date	Tournament	Surface	Opponent	Score
Win	1–0	Feb 1983	Hershey, U.S.	Carpet (i)	(United States) Sandy Collins	2–6, 6–0, 6–4
Loss	1–1	Feb 1983	Palm Springs, U.S.	Hard	(South Africa) Yvonne Vermaak	3–6, 5–7
Loss	1–2	Apr 1983	Amelia Island, U.S.	Clay	(United States) Chris Evert-Lloyd	3–6, 6–2, 5–7
Loss	1–3	Nov 1983	Honolulu, U.S.	Carpet (i)	(United States) Kathleen Horvath	6–4, 2–6, 6–7^{(1–7)}
Loss	1–4	Oct 1984	Tampa, U.S.	Hard	(United States) Michelle Torres	1–6, 6–7^{(4–7)}
Win	2–4	May 1987	Strasbourg, France	Clay	(Italy) Sandra Cecchini	6–3, 6–4

=== Doubles: 3 (2 titles, 1 runner-up) ===
Winner – Legend Grand Slam tournaments (0–0) WTA Tour Championships (0–0) Virginia Slims (2–1)	Finals by surface Hard (2–0) Grass (0–0) Clay (0–1) Carpet (0–0)

Result	W/L	Date	Tournament	Surface	Partner	Opponents	Score
Win	1–0	Oct 1984	Tampa, U.S.	Hard	(Australia) Elizabeth Sayers	(United States) Mary-Lou Daniels (United States) Wendy White	6–4, 6–3
Loss	1–1	Apr 1985	Amelia Island, U.S.	Clay	(United States) Chris Evert-Lloyd	(South Africa) Rosalyn Fairbank (Czechoslovakia) Hana Mandlíková	1–6, 6–2, 2–6
Win	2–1	Nov 1985	Tampa, U.S.	Hard	(Argentina) Gabriela Sabatini	(United States) Lisa Bonder (Peru) Laura Gildemeister	6–0, 6–0

== Grand Slam singles performance timeline ==
Key
W	F	SF	QF	#R	RR	Q#	DNQ	A	NH

(W) winner; (F) finalist; (SF) semifinalist; (QF) quarterfinalist; (#R) rounds 4, 3, 2, 1; (RR) round-robin stage; (Q#) qualification round; (DNQ) did not qualify; (A) absent; (NH) not held; (SR) strike rate (events won / competed); (W–L) win–loss record.

Tournament	1982	1983	1984	1985	1986	1987	1988	1989	1990	Career SR
Australian Open	A	QF	1R	A	NH	4R	A	A	A	0 / 3
French Open	A	1R	QF	4R	QF	3R	1R	A	A	0 / 6
Wimbledon	A	4R	3R	2R	4R	1R	1R	A	A	0 / 6
US Open	A	3R	SF	4R	1R	2R	3R	1R	A	0 / 7
SR	0 / 0	0 / 4	0 / 4	0 / 3	0 / 3	0 / 4	0 / 3	0 / 1	0 / 0	0 / 22
Year-end ranking	95	20	11	15	20	31	147	158	157	

Sporting positions
Preceded by (United States) Penny Barg	Orange Bowl Girls' Singles Champion; Category: 18 and under 1982	Succeeded by (United States) Debbie Spence
