= WTA Tour =

Series of tournaments in women's tennis

WTA Tour logo with Hologic as the title sponsor. (2025)

The WTA Tour (also known as the WTA Tour Driven by Mercedes-Benz for sponsorship reasons) is a worldwide top-tier tennis tour for women and organized by the Women's Tennis Association. The second-tier tour is the WTA 125 series, and third-tier is the Women's World Tennis Tour. The men's equivalent is the ATP Tour.

== Season format ==
=== 2024–present ===
In 2024, the WTA made all WTA 1000 events mandatory. The WTA Elite Trophy did not return:

- Grand Slam tournaments (4)
- Year-ending WTA Finals (1)
- WTA 1000 tournaments: Ten events with prize money ranging from US$2 million to US$10 million.
- WTA 500 tournaments: 17 events with prize money from US$700,000 to US$900,000.
- WTA 250 tournaments: 22 events, with prize money around US$250,000.

=== 2021–2023 ===
The WTA Tour underwent a slight change in the classification of tournaments in 2021, which were reorganized on with similar nomenclature to that used on ATP Tour:

- Grand Slam tournaments (4)
- Year-ending WTA Finals (1)
- Penultimate event WTA Elite Trophy (1)
- WTA 1000 tournaments (9):
  - Mandatory: Five combined tournaments with male professional players with prize money ranging from US$6.5 million to US$8.3 million. These tournaments are held in Indian Wells, Miami, Madrid, Rome and Beijing. The Beijing tournament was not held in 2021 and 2022 due to the COVID-19 pandemic and returned in 2023.
  - Non-mandatory: Four events in Doha/Dubai, Montreal/Toronto, Cincinnati, and Wuhan with prize money ranging from US$2.3 million to US$2.7 million. From 2020 to 2023, the tournament in Wuhan was suspended due to COVID-19 pandemic. In 2022 and 2023, a new WTA 1000 tournament was held in Guadalajara as a replacement for Wuhan. From 2021 to 2023, Doha and Dubai switched off, with one being a WTA 1000 event and the other being a WTA 500 event.
- WTA 500 tournaments: 12 events with prize money from US$700,000 to US$900,000.
- WTA 250 tournaments: 30 events, with prize money at US$250,000.

=== 2009–2020 ===
The WTA Tour comprised from 2009 to the 2021 reorganization:

- Grand Slam tournaments (4)
- Year-ending WTA Tour Championships (1)
- Penultimate event WTA Elite Trophy (From 2015 onwards) (1)
- Premier tournaments (21):
  - Premier Mandatory: Four combined tournaments with male professional players, with US$6.5 million in equal prize money for men and women (increased from $4.5 million in 2013). These tournaments are held in Indian Wells, Miami, Madrid, and Beijing.
  - Premier Five: Five $2.8 million events in Doha/Dubai, Rome, Montreal/Toronto, Cincinnati, and Wuhan.
  - Premier: 12 events with prize money from US$799,000 to US$2.5 million.
- International tournaments: There were 32 tournaments, with prize money for all except four events at US$250,000. The exceptions are the Shenzhen Open, Moscow River Cup, Hong Kong Tennis Open, the Tianjin Open, and the year-ending WTA Tournament of Champions, each with prize money of US$750,000.

== WTA rankings ==
WTA publishes weekly rankings of professional players.

=== Current rankings ===
[ · ]

WTA rankings (singles) as of 10 August 2026
No.	Player	Points	Move
1	Aryna Sabalenka	8,670	Steady
2	Elena Rybakina (KAZ)	8,316	Steady
3	Jessica Pegula (USA)	6,680	Steady
4	Coco Gauff (USA)	5,919	Steady
5	Iga Świątek (POL)	5,419	▲3
6	Mirra Andreeva	5,323	▼1
7	Karolína Muchová (CZE)	5,048	▼1
8	Linda Nosková (CZE)	5,016	▼1
9	Elina Svitolina (UKR)	4,634	Steady
10	Amanda Anisimova (USA)	4,353	Steady
11	Marta Kostyuk (UKR)	3,830	Steady
12	Belinda Bencic (SUI)	2,995	▲2
13	Naomi Osaka (JPN)	2,816	Steady
14	Diana Shnaider	2,798	▲3
15	Jasmine Paolini (ITA)	2,773	Steady
16	Iva Jovic (USA)	2,691	Steady
17	Victoria Mboko (CAN)	2,530	▼5
18	Ekaterina Alexandrova	2,506	▲1
19	Sorana Cîrstea (ROU)	2,502	▼1
20	Alexandra Eala (PHL)	2,216	Steady

[ · ]

WTA rankings (doubles) as of 3 August 2026
No.	Player	Points	Move
1	Kateřina Siniaková (CZE)	10,150	Steady
2	Taylor Townsend (USA)	9,300	Steady
3	Gabriela Dabrowski (CAN)	8,805	Steady
4	Luisa Stefani (BRA)	7,445	Steady
5	Aleksandra Krunić (SRB)	6,950	Steady
6	Anna Danilina (KAZ)	6,775	Steady
7	Elise Mertens (BEL)	5,438	Steady
8	Zhang Shuai (CHN)	5,415	Steady
9	Erin Routliffe (NZL)	4,837	▲3
10	Guo Hanyu (CHN)	4,780	▼1
11	Sara Errani (ITA)	4,625	▼1
12	Nicole Melichar-Martinez (USA)	4,515	▼1
13	Kristina Mladenovic (FRA)	4,350	Steady
14	Jasmine Paolini (ITA)	4,300	Steady
15	Hsieh Su-wei (TPE)	4,055	Steady
16	Cristina Bucșa (ESP)	3,835	Steady
17	Jeļena Ostapenko (LAT)	3,813	Steady
18	Vera Zvonareva	3,707	Steady
19	Ellen Perez (AUS)	3,370	Steady
20	Laura Siegemund (GER)	3,370	Steady

=== Ranking method ===
The WTA rankings are based on a rolling 52-week, cumulative system. A player's ranking is determined by her results at a maximum of 18 tournaments for singles and 12 for doubles. Points are awarded based on how far a player advances in a tournament. The basis for calculating a player's ranking are those tournaments that yield the highest ranking points during the rolling 52-week period. The period must include:

- the four Grand Slams
- six WTA 1000 Mandatory combined/virtually combined tournaments
- one WTA 1000 Mandatory (WTA-only) tournament
- the best of seven results from all WTA 1000 Mandatory, WTA 500, WTA 250, and WTA 125 Tournaments and ITF W15+ events
- the WTA Finals as a bonus tournament if the player attended

All WTA players also have a Universal Tennis Rating, based on head-to-head results.

The points distribution for tournaments in 2024 is shown below:

Category	W	F	SF	QF	R16	R32	R64	R128	Q	Q3	Q2	Q1
Grand Slam (128S, 128Q)	2000	1300	780	430	240	130	70	10	40	30	20	2
Grand Slam (64D)	2000	1300	780	430	240	130	10		40			
WTA Finals (S)	1500*	1000*	600*	(+200 per round robin win)								
WTA Finals (D)	1500*	1000*	600*	(+200 per round robin win)								
WTA 1000 (96S, 48Q)	1000	650	390	215	120	65	35	10	30		20	2
WTA 1000 (56S, 32Q)	1000	650	390	215	120	65	10		30		20	2
WTA 1000 (32/28D)	1000	650	390	215	120	10						
WTA 500 (48S, 24Q)	500	325	195	108	60	32	1		25		13	1
WTA 500 (30/28S, 24/16Q)	500	325	195	108	60	1			25	18	13	1
WTA 500 (24D)	500	325	195	108	60	1						
WTA 500 (16D)	500	325	195	108	1							
WTA 250 (32S, 24/16Q)	250	163	98	54	30	1			18		12	1
WTA 250 (16D)	250	163	98	54	1							
WTA 125 (32S, 16Q)	125	81	49	27	15	1			6		4	1
WTA 125 (32S, 8Q)	125	81	49	27	15	1			6			1
WTA 125 (16D)	125	81	49	27	1							
WTA 125 (8D)	125	81	49	1								
W100 (48S, 32/24Q)	100	65	39	21	12	7	1		5		3	
W100 (32S, 32Q)	100	65	39	21	12	1			5		3	
W100 (16D)	100	65	39	21	1							
W75 (48S, 32/24Q)	75	49	29	16	9	5	1		3		2	
W75 (32S, 32Q)	75	49	29	16	9	1			3		2	
W75 (16D)	75	49	29	16	1							
W50 (48S, 32/24Q)	50	33	20	11	6	3	1		2		1	
W50 (32S, 32Q)	50	33	20	11	6	1			2		1	
W50 (16D)	50	33	20	11	1							
W35 (48S, 32/24Q)	35	23	14	8	4	2	1		1			
W35 (32S, 64/48/32/24Q)	35	23	14	8	4	1			1			
W35 (16D)	35	23	14	8	1							
W15 (32S, 64/48/32/24Q)	15	10	6	3	1							
W15 (16D)	15	10	6	3								

S = singles players, D = doubles teams, Q = qualification players.
* Assumes undefeated round robin match record.

Note that if a player or team receives one or more byes and then loses their first match of the tournament, they will only receive points for the first round of that tournament. For example, if a player receives a bye in R64 and then loses her match in R32, she will only receive points for R64 despite having advanced (via bye) to R32. Similarly, if a player or team withdraws from their first match after receiving a bye, they will not be awarded any points for that tournament.

In ITF tournaments, the main draw is normally 32 for singles and 16 for doubles. Losers in the first round of doubles will receive points equal to that shown in the R32 column above. For subsequent rounds (quarter-finals onwards) the points are the same as for singles.

== See also ==
- WTA 125 Circuit (second tier below WTA Tour)
- ITF Women's World Tennis Tour (third tier below WTA 125 Circuit)
- ATP Tour Association of Tennis Professionals Tour
