= 1988 Italian Open – Women's singles =

Women's singles
- 1988 Italian Open
- 1987 Champion: (West Germany) Steffi Graf

Final
- Champion: (Argentina) Gabriela Sabatini
- Runner-up: (Canada) Helen Kelesi
- Score: 6–1, 6–7, 6–1

Details
- Draw: 56
- Seeds: 16

Events
Singles	men	women
Doubles	men	women
← 1987 ·	Italian Open	· 1989 →

Steffi Graf was the defending champion but did not compete that year.

Gabriela Sabatini won in the final 6–1, 6–7, 6–1 against Helen Kelesi.

== Seeds ==
A champion seed is indicated in bold text while text in italics indicates the round in which that seed was eliminated. The top eight seeds received a bye to the second round.

1. (United States) Chris Evert (third round)
2. (Argentina) **Gabriela Sabatini (champion)**
3. (West Germany) Claudia Kohde-Kilsch (third round)
4. (Bulgaria) Katerina Maleeva (second round)
5. (Italy) Raffaella Reggi (quarterfinals)
6. (Italy) Sandra Cecchini (quarterfinals)
7. (West Germany) Sylvia Hanika (quarterfinals)
8. (Spain) Arantxa Sánchez (semifinals)
9. (France) Nathalie Tauziat (first round)
10. (West Germany) Isabel Cueto (third round)
11. (Czechoslovakia) Jana Novotná (first round)
12. (United States) Kathleen Horvath (first round)
13. (Austria) Judith Wiesner (semifinals)
14. (Canada) Helen Kelesi (final)
15. n/a
16. n/a

== Draw ==
=== Key ===
- Q = Qualifier
- WC = Wild card
- LL = Lucky loser
- Alt = Alternate
- SE = Special exempt
- PR = Protected ranking
- ITF = ITF entry
- JE = Junior exempt
- w/o = Walkover
- r = Retired
- d = Defaulted
- SR = Special ranking

=== Finals ===
Semifinals
14	(Canada) **Helen Kelesi**	**6**	**7**
8	(Spain) Arantxa Sánchez	3	5
13	(Austria) Judith Wiesner	6	3
2	(Argentina) **Gabriela Sabatini**	**7**	**6**

Final
14	(Canada) Helen Kelesi	1	**7**	1
2	(Argentina) **Gabriela Sabatini**	**6**	6	**6**

=== Top half ===
==== Section 1 ====
First round
(Australia) **N Provis**	**7**	5	**6**
Q	(Australia) J Byrne	5	**7**	3
(Austria) P Huber	2	**6**	2
Q	(Switzerland) **C Cohen**	**6**	4	**6**
(Italy) L Garrone	1	6
14	(Canada) **H Kelesi**	**6**	**7**
10	(West Germany) **I Cueto**	**6**	**7**
(Argentina) M Paz	3	6
(Switzerland) C Jolissaint	2	3
(Czechoslovakia) **R Zrubáková**	**6**	**6**
(Netherlands) H ter Riet	4	3
(France) **I Demongeot**	**6**	**6**

Second round
1	(United States) **C Evert**	**7**	**6**
(Australia) N Provis	6	0
Q	(Switzerland) C Cohen	0	2
14	(Canada) **H Kelesi**	**6**	**6**
10	(West Germany) **I Cueto**	**7**	6	**6**
(Czechoslovakia) R Zrubáková	5	**7**	3
(France) I Demongeot	**7**	4	1
5	(Italy) **R Reggi**	5	**6**	**6**

Third round
1	(United States) C Evert
14	(Canada) **H Kelesi**	**w/o**
10	(West Germany) I Cueto	5	3
5	(Italy) **R Reggi**	**7**	**6**

Quarterfinals
14	(Canada) **H Kelesi**	**6**	**6**
5	(Italy) R Reggi	4	3

==== Section 2 ====
First round
(Argentina) **B Fulco**	**6**	**7**
(United States) M Gurney	3	5
(United States) B Bowes	2	3
Q	(Italy) **S La Fratta**	**6**	**6**
(Argentina) M Pérez-Roldán	3	**6**	4
(France) **J Halard**	**6**	4	**6**
12	(United States) K Horvath	4	0
(Poland) **I Kuczyńska**	**6**	**6**
(France) C Suire	3	2
(Socialist Federal Republic of Yugoslavia) **S Goleš**	**6**	**6**
(Austria) B Paulus	1	3
(Italy) **L Ferrando**	**6**	**6**

Second round
4	(Bulgaria) K Maleeva	5	2
(Argentina) **B Fulco**	**7**	**6**
Q	(Italy) S La Fratta	1	2
(France) **J Halard**	**6**	**6**
(Poland) I Kuczyńska	2	2
(Socialist Federal Republic of Yugoslavia) **S Goleš**	**6**	**6**
(Italy) L Ferrando	2	1
8	(Spain) **A Sánchez**	**6**	**6**

Third round
(Argentina) **B Fulco**	**6**	**6**
(France) J Halard	3	3
(Socialist Federal Republic of Yugoslavia) S Goleš	3	3
8	(Spain) **A Sánchez**	**6**	**6**

Quarterfinals
(Argentina) B Fulco	4	4
8	(Spain) **A Sánchez**	**6**	**6**

=== Bottom half ===
==== Section 3 ====
First round
(Czechoslovakia) I Budařová	**7**	4	5
Q	(Czechoslovakia) **D Krajčovičová**	6	**6**	**7**
(Switzerland) **E Krapl**	**6**	**6**
(Italy) L Golarsa	3	2
Q	(Greece) **A Kanellopoulou**	3	**6**	**6**
9	(France) N Tauziat	**6**	2	0
13	(Austria) **J Wiesner**	**6**	5	**6**
(Italy) G Boschiero	3	**7**	2
(Argentina) **A Villagrán**	3	**7**	**6**
(Belgium) S Wasserman	**6**	5	2
(Italy) **C Caverzasio**	**6**	**6**
(West Germany) C Singer	4	1

Second round
6	(Italy) **S Cecchini**	**6**	**6**
Q	(Czechoslovakia) D Krajčovičová	4	1
(Switzerland) E Krapl	3	0
Q	(Greece) **A Kanellopoulou**	**6**	**6**
13	(Austria) **J Wiesner**	**6**	**6**
(Argentina) A Villagrán	4	2
(Italy) C Caverzasio	0	1
3	(West Germany) **C Kohde-Kilsch**	**6**	**6**

Third round
6	(Italy) **S Cecchini**	4	**6**	**6**
Q	(Greece) A Kanellopoulou	**6**	1	4
13	(Austria) **J Wiesner**	**6**	4	**6**
3	(West Germany) C Kohde-Kilsch	4	**6**	4

Quarterfinals
6	(Italy) S Cecchini	3	3
13	(Austria) **J Wiesner**	**6**	**6**

==== Section 4 ====
First round
(Netherlands) M Bollegraf	1	4
Q	(Italy) **B Romanò**	**6**	**6**
(Italy) L Lapi	4	2
(Italy) **F Bonsignori**	**6**	**6**
(France) C Tanvier	1	**6**	2
(France) **A Dechaume**	**6**	2	**6**
11	(Czechoslovakia) J Novotná	**6**	1	6
(Brazil) **N Dias**	2	**6**	**7**
Q	(France) **E Derly**	**6**	**6**
(Brazil) G Miró	2	3
(Brazil) P Medrado	3	0
Q	(United States) **A Schwartz**	**6**	**6**

Second round
7	(West Germany) **S Hanika**	3	**6**	**6**
Q	(Italy) B Romanò	**6**	3	2
(Italy) F Bonsignori	3	4
(France) **A Dechaume**	**6**	**6**
(Brazil) **N Dias**	4	**6**	**7**
Q	(France) E Derly	**6**	3	5
Q	(United States) A Schwartz	4	2
2	(Argentina) **G Sabatini**	**6**	**6**

Third round
7	(West Germany) **S Hanika**	**6**	**6**
(France) A Dechaume	2	1
(Brazil) N Dias	0	2
2	(Argentina) **G Sabatini**	**6**	**6**

Quarterfinals
7	(West Germany) S Hanika	**6**	1	1
2	(Argentina) **G Sabatini**	3	**6**	**6**
