= 1989 Italian Open – Men's doubles =

Men's doubles
- 1989 Italian Open

Final
- Champions: (United States) Jim Courier (United States) Pete Sampras
- Runners-up: (Brazil) Danilo Marcelino (Brazil) Mauro Menezes
- Score: 6–4, 6–3

Events
Singles	men	women
Doubles	men	women
← 1988 ·	Italian Open	· 1990 →

Jorge Lozano and Todd Witsken were the defending champions but lost in the first round to Rikard Bergh and Nicolás Pereira.

Jim Courier and Pete Sampras won in the final 6–4, 6–3 against Danilo Marcelino and Mauro Menezes.

== Seeds ==
1. (Mexico) Jorge Lozano / (United States) Todd Witsken (first round)
2. (Australia) Darren Cahill / (United States) Patrick McEnroe (first round)
3. (Ecuador) Andrés Gómez / (South Africa) Christo van Rensburg (quarterfinals)
4. (South Africa) Pieter Aldrich / (South Africa) Danie Visser (first round)
5. (Spain) Emilio Sánchez / (Spain) Javier Sánchez (second round)
6. (Spain) Sergio Casal / (Hungary) Balázs Taróczy (second round)
7. (Australia) Peter Doohan / (Australia) Laurie Warder (quarterfinals)
8. (Czechoslovakia) Petr Korda / (Czechoslovakia) Milan Šrejber (second round)

== Draw ==
=== Key ===
- Q = Qualifier
- WC = Wild card
- LL = Lucky loser
- Alt = Alternate
- ITF = ITF entry
- PR = Protected ranking
- SR = Special ranking
- SE = Special exempt
- JE = Junior exempt
- JR = Junior Accelerator Programme entrant
- CO = College Accelerator Programme entrant
- NG = Next Gen Accelerator Program entrant
- w/o = Walkover
- r = Retired
- d = Defaulted

=== Final ===
Semifinals
(United States) Jim Courier (United States) Pete Sampras	6	6
(Peru) Carlos di Laura (Uruguay) Marcelo Filippini	3	4
(Brazil) Danilo Marcelino (Brazil) Mauro Menezes	6	6	6
(Denmark) Michael Mortensen (Netherlands) Tom Nijssen	7	3	4

Final
(United States) Jim Courier (United States) Pete Sampras	6	6
(Brazil) Danilo Marcelino (Brazil) Mauro Menezes	4	3

=== Top half ===
First round
1	(Mexico) J Lozano (United States) T Witsken	0	2
(Sweden) R Bergh (Venezuela) N Pereira	6	6
(Italy) U Colombini (Belgium) L Pimek	2	7	1
(Argentina) J Frana (Argentina) G Luza	6	6	6
(United States) J Courier (United States) P Sampras	6	6
(United States) M De Palmer (United States) J Letts	3	2
(Italy) O Camporese (Italy) C Panatta	3	4
8	(Czechoslovakia) P Korda (Czechoslovakia) M Šrejber	6	6
4	(South Africa) P Aldrich (South Africa) D Visser	4	3
(Socialist Federal Republic of Yugoslavia) G Ivanišević (Italy) D Nargiso	6	6
(Brazil) L Mattar (Uruguay) D Pérez	7	6
(Sweden) P Lundgren (United States) B Willenborg	6	2
(Peru) C di Laura (Uruguay) M Filippini	6	6
(United States) J Connors (Romania) I Năstase	3	2
(Sweden) J Gunnarsson (Sweden) M Wilander	1	7	2
5	(Spain) E Sánchez (Spain) J Sánchez	6	6	6

Second round
(Sweden) R Bergh (Venezuela) N Pereira	2	7	0
(Argentina) J Frana (Argentina) G Luza	6	6	6
(United States) J Courier (United States) P Sampras	6	6
8	(Czechoslovakia) P Korda (Czechoslovakia) M Šrejber	4	4
(Socialist Federal Republic of Yugoslavia) G Ivanišević (Italy) D Nargiso	2	3
(Brazil) L Mattar (Uruguay) D Pérez	6	6
(Peru) C di Laura (Uruguay) M Filippini	w/o
5	(Spain) E Sánchez (Spain) J Sánchez

Quarterfinals
(Argentina) J Frana (Argentina) G Luza	1	4
(United States) J Courier (United States) P Sampras	6	6
(Brazil) L Mattar (Uruguay) D Pérez	4	4
(Peru) C di Laura (Uruguay) M Filippini	6	6

Semifinals
(United States) J Courier (United States) P Sampras	6	6
(Peru) C di Laura (Uruguay) M Filippini	3	4

=== Bottom half ===
First round
6	(Spain) S Casal (Hungary) B Taróczy	7	6
(Spain) T Carbonell (Spain) C Costa	6	4
(Brazil) D Marcelino (Brazil) M Menezes	6	6
(United States) B Dickinson (Netherlands) M Koevermans	3	4
WC	(United States) R Baxter (Czechoslovakia) K Nováček	0	6
(United States) M Davis (United States) T Pawsat	6	7
(Italy) M Boscatto (Italy) S Pescosolido	6	3
3	(Ecuador) A Gómez (South Africa) C van Rensburg	7	6
7	(Australia) P Doohan (Australia) L Warder	6	6
(Italy) M Narducci (Italy) C Pistolesi	0	0
(Brazil) R Acioly (Brazil) C Motta	6	5
(Italy) S Colombo (Switzerland) C Mezzadri	7	7
(Socialist Federal Republic of Yugoslavia) B Orešar (Peru) J Yzaga	6	6	6
(Italy) N Devide (Mexico) L Lavalle	0	7	4
(Denmark) M Mortensen (Netherlands) T Nijssen	7	3	6
2	(Australia) D Cahill (United States) P McEnroe	6	6	3

Second round
6	(Spain) S Casal (Hungary) B Taróczy	6	6	3
(Brazil) D Marcelino (Brazil) M Menezes	7	4	6
(United States) M Davis (United States) T Pawsat	5	2
3	(Ecuador) A Gómez (South Africa) C van Rensburg	7	6
7	(Australia) P Doohan (Australia) L Warder	6	6
(Italy) S Colombo (Switzerland) C Mezzadri	2	1
(Socialist Federal Republic of Yugoslavia) B Orešar (Peru) J Yzaga	3	6	5
(Denmark) M Mortensen (Netherlands) T Nijssen	6	2	7

Quarterfinals
(Brazil) D Marcelino (Brazil) M Menezes	7	6
3	(Ecuador) A Gómez (South Africa) C van Rensburg	5	4
7	(Australia) P Doohan (Australia) L Warder	1	1
(Denmark) M Mortensen (Netherlands) T Nijssen	6	6

Semifinals
(Brazil) D Marcelino (Brazil) M Menezes	6	6	6
(Denmark) M Mortensen (Netherlands) T Nijssen	7	3	4
