= 1987 Italian Open – Men's doubles =

Men's doubles
- 1987 Italian Open

Final
- Champions: (France) Guy Forget (France) Yannick Noah
- Runners-up: (Czechoslovakia) Miloslav Mečíř (Czechoslovakia) Tomáš Šmíd
- Score: 6–2, 6–7, 6–3

Events
Singles	men	women
Doubles	men	women
- Italian Open

Guy Forget and Yannick Noah were the defending champions and successfully defended their title, by defeating Miloslav Mečíř and Tomáš Šmíd 6–2, 6–7, 6–3 in the final.

== Seeds ==
1. (Chile) Hans Gildemeister / (Ecuador) Andrés Gómez (quarterfinals)
2. (France) Guy Forget / (France) Yannick Noah (champions)
3. (Sweden) Joakim Nyström / (Sweden) Mats Wilander (quarterfinals)
4. (Spain) Sergio Casal / (Spain) Emilio Sánchez (second round)
5. (Czechoslovakia) Miloslav Mečíř / (Czechoslovakia) Tomáš Šmíd (final)
6. (United States) Gary Donnelly / (United States) Robert Seguso (semifinals)
7. (Sweden) Anders Järryd / (Sweden) Jonas Svensson (first round)
8. (Australia) Laurie Warder / (United States) Blaine Willenborg (second round)

== Draw ==
Key

- Q = Qualifier
- WC = Wild card
- LL = Lucky loser
- Alt = Alternate
- ITF = ITF entry
- PR = Protected ranking
- SR = Special ranking
- SE = Special exempt
- JE = Junior exempt
- JR = Junior Accelerator Programme entrant
- CO = College Accelerator Programme entrant
- NG = Next Gen Accelerator Program entrant
- w/o = Walkover
- r = Retired
- d = Defaulted

=== Finals ===
Semifinals
(Italy) Paolo Canè (United States) John McEnroe	2	3
5	(Czechoslovakia) Miloslav Mečíř (Czechoslovakia) Tomáš Šmíd	6	6
6	(United States) Gary Donnelly (United States) Robert Seguso	6	5
2	(France) Guy Forget (France) Yannick Noah	7	7

Final
5	(Czechoslovakia) Miloslav Mečíř (Czechoslovakia) Tomáš Šmíd	2	7	3
2	(France) Guy Forget (France) Yannick Noah	6	6	6

=== Top half ===
First round
1	(Chile) H Gildemeister (Ecuador) A Gómez	6	6
(Argentina) R Azar (Argentina) E Bengoechea	2	2
(Austria) T Muster (Sweden) U Stenlund	6	5	3
(Iran) M Bahrami (France) T Tulasne	3	7	6
(Italy) P Canè (United States) J McEnroe	6	6
WC	(Argentina) M Jaite (Argentina) G Vilas	3	1
WC	(Italy) C Aprili (Italy) C Pistolesi	2	1
8	(Australia) L Warder (United States) B Willenborg	6	6
3	(Sweden) J Nyström (Sweden) M Wilander	4	6	7
(Sweden) J Gunnarsson (Sweden) M Pernfors	6	4	6
(Italy) F Cancellotti (Italy) S Colombo	6	7
(United States) E Korita (Paraguay) V Pecci	4	6
(Argentina) G Luza (Argentina) C Miniussi	6	7
(Argentina) J Frana (Australia) C Limberger	1	6
(Brazil) L Mattar (Brazil) C Motta	4	3
5	(Czechoslovakia) M Mečíř (Czechoslovakia) T Šmíd	6	6

Second round
1	(Chile) H Gildemeister (Ecuador) A Gómez	7	6
(Iran) M Bahrami (France) T Tulasne	6	2
(Italy) P Canè (United States) J McEnroe	4	6	6
8	(Australia) L Warder (United States) B Willenborg	6	4	3
3	(Sweden) J Nyström (Sweden) M Wilander	6	6
(Italy) F Cancellotti (Italy) S Colombo	3	2
(Argentina) G Luza (Argentina) C Miniussi	3	6	3
5	(Czechoslovakia) M Mečíř (Czechoslovakia) T Šmíd	6	3	6

Quarterfinals
1	(Chile) H Gildemeister (Ecuador) A Gómez	3	2
(Italy) P Canè (United States) J McEnroe	6	6
3	(Sweden) J Nyström (Sweden) M Wilander	6	1	4
5	(Czechoslovakia) M Mečíř (Czechoslovakia) T Šmíd	2	6	6

Semifinals
(Italy) P Canè (United States) J McEnroe	2	3
5	(Czechoslovakia) M Mečíř (Czechoslovakia) T Šmíd	6	6

=== Bottom half ===
First round
6	(United States) G Donnelly (United States) R Seguso	6	7
(France) T Benhabiles (France) L Courteau	3	6
WC	(Italy) D Nargiso (Italy) E Rossi	3	6	0
(Italy) C Panatta (Netherlands) M Schapers	6	4	6
(Switzerland) C Mezzadri (Italy) G Ocleppo	6	6	7
(Sweden) R Båthman (United States) J Pugh	4	7	6
(United States) J Arias (United States) T Warneke	6	3
4	(Spain) S Casal (Spain) E Sánchez	7	6
7	(Sweden) A Järryd (Sweden) J Svensson	7	4	0
(Australia) P McNamee (Australia) P McNamara	6	6	6
(United States) I Lendl (Czechoslovakia) L Pimek	6	6
(Denmark) M Christensen (Sweden) LA Wahlgren	1	2
(Italy) A de Minicis (Brazil) I Kley	6	7
(Spain) J Arrese (Spain) J López-Maeso	3	5
(West Germany) B Becker (France) H Leconte	6	4	6
2	(France) G Forget (France) Y Noah	4	6	7

Second round
6	(United States) G Donnelly (United States) R Seguso	6	7
(Italy) C Panatta (Netherlands) M Schapers	3	6
(Switzerland) C Mezzadri (Italy) G Ocleppo	6	3	6
4	(Spain) S Casal (Spain) E Sánchez	4	6	3
(Australia) P McNamee (Australia) P McNamara	6	6
(United States) I Lendl (Czechoslovakia) L Pimek	3	3
(Italy) A de Minicis (Brazil) I Kley	3	6
2	(France) G Forget (France) Y Noah	6	7

Quarterfinals
6	(United States) G Donnelly (United States) R Seguso	6	6
(Switzerland) C Mezzadri (Italy) G Ocleppo	2	0
(Australia) P McNamee (Australia) P McNamara	7	1	1
2	(France) G Forget (France) Y Noah	6	6	6

Semifinals
6	(United States) G Donnelly (United States) R Seguso	6	5
2	(France) G Forget (France) Y Noah	7	7
