= 1989 Italian Open – Men's singles =

Men's singles
- 1989 Italian Open

Final
- Champion: (Argentina) Alberto Mancini
- Runner-up: (United States) Andre Agassi
- Score: 6–3, 4–6, 2–6, 7–6, 6–1

Details
- Draw: 64
- Seeds: 16

Events
Singles	men	women
Doubles	men	women
← 1988 ·	Italian Open	· 1990 →

Alberto Mancini defeated Andre Agassi in the final, 6–3, 4–6, 2–6, 7–6, 6–1, to win the men's singles tennis title at the 1989 Italian Open. Mancini saved a championship point in the fourth set.

Ivan Lendl was the defending champion, but did not compete this year.

== Seeds ==
1. (Sweden) Mats Wilander (third round)
2. (United States) Andre Agassi (final)
3. (Sweden) Kent Carlsson (first round)
4. (Czechoslovakia) Miloslav Mečíř (first round)
5. (United States) Jimmy Connors (third round)
6. (Spain) Emilio Sánchez (third round)
7. (United States) Aaron Krickstein (second round)
8. (Argentina) Guillermo Pérez Roldán (quarterfinals)
9. (Haiti) Ronald Agénor (first round)
10. (Australia) Darren Cahill (third round)
11. (Argentina) Alberto Mancini (champion)
12. (Ecuador) Andrés Gómez (first round)
13. (Peru) Jaime Yzaga (third round)
14. (Austria) Horst Skoff (first round)
15. (Uruguay) Marcelo Filippini (second round)
16. (Australia) Mark Woodforde (first round)

== Draw ==
=== Key ===
- Q = Qualifier
- WC = Wild card
- LL = Lucky loser
- Alt = Alternate
- ITF = ITF entry
- PR = Protected ranking
- SR = Special ranking
- SE = Special exempt
- JE = Junior exempt
- JR = Junior Accelerator Programme entrant
- CO = College Accelerator Programme entrant
- NG = Next Gen Accelerator Program entrant
- w/o = Walkover
- r = Retired
- d = Defaulted

=== Finals ===
Semifinals
(Spain) Jordi Arrese	2	4
11	(Argentina) Alberto Mancini	6	6
(Spain) Sergi Bruguera	3	4
2	(United States) Andre Agassi	6	6

Final
11	(Argentina) Alberto Mancini	6	4	2	7	6
2	(United States) Andre Agassi	3	6	6	6	1

=== Top half ===
==== Section 1 ====
First round
1	(Sweden) M Wilander	6	6	6
(Argentina) J Frana	7	3	2
(Spain) J Sánchez	6	6
(Sweden) J Nyström	3	0
(United States) J Arias	6	3	0
(United States) J Berger	4	6	6
(Sweden) J Gunnarsson	5	4
15	(Uruguay) M Filippini	7	6
10	(Australia) D Cahill	1	7	6
Q	(Argentina) F Davín	6	5	2
(Czechoslovakia) M Střelba	1	7	6
(Brazil) L Mattar	6	6	0
(Spain) J Arrese	6	4	6
(Czechoslovakia) M Šrejber	2	6	1
(Soviet Union) A Võsand	3	2
7	(United States) A Krickstein	6	6

Second round
1	(Sweden) M Wilander	4	6	6
(Spain) J Sánchez	6	4	3
(United States) J Berger	7	6
15	(Uruguay) M Filippini	5	3
10	(Australia) D Cahill	6	2	6
(Czechoslovakia) M Střelba	3	6	2
(Spain) J Arrese	6	7
7	(United States) A Krickstein	4	5

Third round
1	(Sweden) M Wilander	3	4
(United States) J Berger	6	6
10	(Australia) D Cahill	6	3	5
(Spain) J Arrese	3	6	7

Quarterfinals
(United States) J Berger	1	1
(Spain) J Arrese	6	6

==== Section 2 ====
First round
4	(Czechoslovakia) M Mečíř	2	5
WC	(Italy) O Camporese	6	7
(Socialist Federal Republic of Yugoslavia) G Ivanišević	6	6
(Venezuela) N Pereira	4	3
Q	(Portugal) N Marques	3	1
(Netherlands) T Nijssen	6	6
(Czechoslovakia) M Vajda	5	2
13	(Peru) J Yzaga	7	6
11	(Argentina) A Mancini	6	6
Q	(Spain) F Clavet	3	2
(United States) L Duncan	7	6
(France) T Tulasne	5	1
WC	(Italy) M Narducci	5	4
(Argentina) M Jaite	7	6
(Argentina) E Bengoechea	1	2
6	(Spain) E Sánchez	6	6

Second round
WC	(Italy) O Camporese	5	6	6
(Socialist Federal Republic of Yugoslavia) G Ivanišević	7	4	2
(Netherlands) T Nijssen	2	2
13	(Peru) J Yzaga	6	6
11	(Argentina) A Mancini	6	6
(United States) L Duncan	2	1
(Argentina) M Jaite	2	5
6	(Spain) E Sánchez	6	7

Third round
WC	(Italy) O Camporese	6	6
13	(Peru) J Yzaga	3	4
11	(Argentina) A Mancini	w/o
6	(Spain) E Sánchez

Quarterfinals
WC	(Italy) O Camporese	5	7	3
11	(Argentina) A Mancini	7	6	6

=== Bottom half ===
==== Section 3 ====
First round
5	(United States) J Connors	6	6
Q	(France) C Pioline	4	2
Q	(Peru) C di Laura	1	1
Q	(Italy) M Cierro	6	6
(Czechoslovakia) K Nováček	6	6
(Spain) S Casal	1	2
(Spain) S Bruguera	2	6	6
12	(Ecuador) A Gómez	6	2	2
14	(Austria) H Skoff	5	6	3
(Italy) D Nargiso	7	4	6
(Brazil) C Motta	3	6	2
(Italy) C Pistolesi	6	2	6
(Australia) J Stoltenberg	4	5
WC	(Argentina) J L Clerc	6	7
(Netherlands) M Koevermans	6	6
3	(Sweden) K Carlsson	3	4

Second round
5	(United States) J Connors	6	6	6
Q	(Italy) M Cierro	7	2	3
(Czechoslovakia) K Nováček	6	4	3
(Spain) S Bruguera	2	6	6
(Italy) D Nargiso	6	6
(Italy) C Pistolesi	2	1
WC	(Argentina) J L Clerc	3	1
(Netherlands) M Koevermans	6	6

Third round
5	(United States) J Connors	1	1
(Spain) S Bruguera	6	6
(Italy) D Nargiso	3	6	1
(Netherlands) M Koevermans	6	3	6

Quarterfinals
(Spain) S Bruguera	6	6
(Netherlands) M Koevermans	2	4

==== Section 4 ====
First round
8	(Argentina) G Pérez Roldán	6	6
(France) T Champion	1	0
(Argentina) H de la Peña	6	4
Q	(France) J Potier	7	6
WC	(Italy) C Panatta	1	2
(United States) J Courier	6	6
(Socialist Federal Republic of Yugoslavia) B Orešar	7	3	6
9	(Haiti) R Agénor	6	6	2
16	(Australia) M Woodforde	2	3
(Spain) F Luna	6	6
WC	(Italy) S Pescosolido	4	1
(Mexico) L Lavalle	6	6
Q	(Uruguay) D Pérez	2	3
(United States) P Sampras	6	6
(United States) T Witsken	1	4
2	(United States) A Agassi	6	6

Second round
8	(Argentina) G Pérez Roldán	7	6
Q	(France) J Potier	6	4
(United States) J Courier	6	6
(Socialist Federal Republic of Yugoslavia) B Orešar	4	1
(Spain) F Luna	3	6	3
(Mexico) L Lavalle	6	3	6
(United States) P Sampras	2	1
2	(United States) A Agassi	6	6

Third round
8	(Argentina) G Pérez Roldán	6	6	6
(United States) J Courier	1	7	3
(Mexico) L Lavalle	3	4
2	(United States) A Agassi	6	6

Quarterfinals
8	(Argentina) G Pérez Roldán	3	1
2	(United States) A Agassi	6	6
