= 1987 Italian Open (tennis) =

- Date: 11–17 May (men); 4–10 May (women)
- Edition: 44th
- Prize money: $400,000 (men) $150,000 (women)
- Surface: Clay / outdoor
- Location: Rome, Italy
- Venue: Foro Italico

Champions

Men's singles
- (Sweden) Mats Wilander

Women's singles
- (West Germany) Steffi Graf

Men's doubles
- (France) Guy Forget / (France) Yannick Noah

Women's doubles
- (United States) Martina Navratilova / (Argentina) Gabriela Sabatini
| ← 1986 · | Italian Open | · 1988 → |

The 1987 Italian Open was a tennis tournament played on outdoor clay courts at the Foro Italico in Rome in Italy that was part of the 1987 Nabisco Grand Prix and of 1987 Virginia Slims World Championship Series. The men's tournament was held from 11 May through 17 May 1987 while the women's tournament was held from 4 May through 10 May 1987. Mats Wilander and Steffi Graf won the singles titles.

== Finals ==
=== Men's singles ===
(Sweden) Mats Wilander defeated (Argentina) Martín Jaite 6–3, 6–4, 6–4

=== Women's singles ===
(West Germany) Steffi Graf defeated (Argentina) Gabriela Sabatini 7–5, 4–6, 6–0

=== Men's doubles ===
(France) Guy Forget / (France) Yannick Noah defeated (Czechoslovakia) Miloslav Mečíř / (Czechoslovakia) Tomáš Šmíd 6–2, 6–7, 6–3

=== Women's doubles ===
(United States) Martina Navratilova / (Argentina) Gabriela Sabatini defeated (West Germany) Claudia Kohde-Kilsch / (Czechoslovakia) Helena Suková 6–4, 6–1
