= 1988 Italian Open – Women's doubles =

Women's doubles
- 1988 Italian Open
- 1987 Champions: (United States) Martina Navratilova; (Argentina) Gabriela Sabatini

Final
- Champions: (Czechoslovakia) Jana Novotná; (France) Catherine Suire
- Runners-up: (Australia) Jenny Byrne; (Australia) Janine Tremelling
- Score: 6–3, 4–6, 7–5

Details
- Draw: 28
- Seeds: 8

Events
Singles	men	women
Doubles	men	women
← 1987 ·	Italian Open	· 1989 →

Martina Navratilova and Gabriela Sabatini were the defending champions but did not compete that year.

Jana Novotná and Catherine Suire won in the final 6–3, 4–6, 7–5 against Jenny Byrne and Janine Tremelling.

== Seeds ==
Champion seeds are indicated in bold text while text in italics indicates the round in which those seeds were eliminated. The top four seeded teams received byes into the second round.

1. (Czechoslovakia) **Jana Novotná** / (France) **Catherine Suire (champions)**
2. (Argentina) Mercedes Paz / (France) Catherine Tanvier (semifinals)
3. (France) Isabelle Demongeot / (France) Nathalie Tauziat (quarterfinals)
4. (Australia) Jenny Byrne / (Australia) Janine Tremelling (final)
5. (Switzerland) Christiane Jolissaint / (Spain) Arantxa Sánchez (quarterfinals)
6. (Netherlands) Manon Bollegraf / (Australia) Nicole Provis (quarterfinals)
7. (United States) Beverly Bowes / (United States) Kathleen Horvath (first round)
8. (Italy) Sandra Cecchini / (Socialist Federal Republic of Yugoslavia) Sabrina Goleš (semifinals)

== Draw ==
=== Key ===
- Q = Qualifier
- WC = Wild card
- LL = Lucky loser
- Alt = Alternate
- SE = Special exempt
- PR = Protected ranking
- ITF = ITF entry
- JE = Junior exempt
- w/o = Walkover
- r = Retired
- d = Defaulted
- SR = Special ranking

=== Final ===
Final

1
- (Czechoslovakia) **Jana Novotná**
- (France) **Catherine Suire**
**6**
4
**7**

4
- (Australia) Jenny Byrne
- (Australia) Janine Tremelling
3
**6**
5

=== Top half ===
First round

Second round

Quarterfinals

Semifinals

1
- (Czechoslovakia) **J Novotná**
- (France) **C Suire**
**6**
**7**

- (Greece) **A Kanellopoulou**
- (Italy) **B Romanò**
**6**
**6**

- (Greece) A Kanellopoulou
- (Italy) B Romanò
2
6

- (Switzerland) E Krapl
- (Belgium) S Wasserman
4
2

1
- (Czechoslovakia) **J Novotná**
- (France) **C Suire**
**6**
**6**

- (France) J Halard
- (Poland) I Kuczyńska
**6**
3
6

6
- (Netherlands) M Bollegraf
- (Australia) N Provis
1
3

- (Australia) **L O'Neill**
- (United States) **J Smoller**
3
**6**
**7**

- (Australia) L O'Neill
- (United States) J Smoller
5
1

- (West Germany) A Betzner
- (Austria) J Wiesner
**6**
2
4

6
- (Netherlands) **M Bollegraf**
- (Australia) **N Provis**
**7**
**6**

6
- (Netherlands) **M Bollegraf**
- (Australia) **N Provis**
2
**6**
**6**

1
- (Czechoslovakia) **J Novotná**
- (France) **C Suire**
**6**
**6**

8
(Italy) S Cecchini
(Socialist Federal Republic of Yugoslavia) S Goleš
1
4

3
- (France) **I Demongeot**
- (France) **N Tauziat**
**6**
**7**

- (France) **A Dechaume**
- (France) **E Derly**
**6**
**6**

- (France) A Dechaume
- (France) E Derly
1
5

- (Brazil) N Dias
- (Brazil) P Medrado
1
4

3
- (France) I Demongeot
- (France) N Tauziat
4
3

- (Australia) L Field
- (Argentina) A Villagrán
**6**
4
4

8
(Italy) **S Cecchini**
(Socialist Federal Republic of Yugoslavia) **S Goleš**
**6**
**6**

- (Italy) **L Ferrando**
- (Italy) **L Golarsa**
3
**6**
**6**

- (Italy) L Ferrando
- (Italy) L Golarsa
1
3

- (Italy) F Bonsignori
- (Italy) S La Fratta
3
**6**
3

8
(Italy) **S Cecchini**
(Socialist Federal Republic of Yugoslavia) **S Goleš**
**6**
**6**

8
(Italy) **S Cecchini**
(Socialist Federal Republic of Yugoslavia) **S Goleš**
**6**
1
**6**

=== Bottom half ===
First round

Second round

Quarterfinals

Semifinals

7
- (United States) **B Bowes**
- (United States) **K Horvath**
**6**
**6**

- (Austria) H Sprung
- (Sweden) M Strandlund
4
3

7
- (United States) B Bowes
- (United States) K Horvath
**6**
4
6

- (Czechoslovakia) **J Pospíšilová**
- (Czechoslovakia) **R Zrubáková**
**6**
**6**

- (Czechoslovakia) **J Pospíšilová**
- (Czechoslovakia) **R Zrubáková**
3
**6**
**7**

- (Brazil) L Tella
- (Brazil) A Vieira
3
0

- (Czechoslovakia) J Pospíšilová
- (Czechoslovakia) R Zrubáková
2
1

- (Italy) **C Caverzasio**
- (Italy) **L Lapi**
**6**
**6**

4
- (Australia) **J Byrne**
- (Australia) **J Tremelling**
**6**
**6**

- (Czechoslovakia) H Fukárková
- (Czechoslovakia) D Krajčovičová
3
1

- (Italy) C Caverzasio
- (Italy) L Lapi
**6**
3
3

4
- (Australia) **J Byrne**
- (Australia) **J Tremelling**
4
**6**
**6**

4
- (Australia) **J Byrne**
- (Australia) **J Tremelling**
**7**
**6**

5
- (Switzerland) **C Jolissaint**
- (Spain) **A Sánchez**
5
**6**
**7**

2
- (Argentina) M Paz
- (France) C Tanvier
5
2

- (Argentina) B Fulco
- (United States) E Raponi-Longo
**7**
3
5

5
- (Switzerland) **C Jolissaint**
- (Spain) **A Sánchez**
**6**
**6**

- (Italy) **L Garrone**
- (Canada) **H Kelesi**
**6**
**6**

- (Italy) L Garrone
- (Canada) H Kelesi
3
2

- (Italy) G Boschiero
- (Italy) S Farina
3
2

5
- (Switzerland) C Jolissaint
- (Spain) A Sánchez
6
2

- (Bulgaria) K Maleeva
- (Argentina) M Pérez-Roldán
**7**
6
2

2
- (Argentina) **M Paz**
- (France) **C Tanvier**
**7**
**6**

- (Brazil) **L Corsato**
- (Brazil) **G Faria**
5
**7**
**6**

- (Brazil) L Corsato
- (Brazil) G Faria
0
0

2
- (Argentina) **M Paz**
- (France) **C Tanvier**
**6**
**6**
