= 1987 Italian Open – Men's singles =

Men's singles
- 1987 Italian Open

Final
- Champion: (Sweden) Mats Wilander
- Runner-up: (Argentina) Martín Jaite
- Score: 6–3, 6–4, 6–4

Details
- Draw: 64 (5WC/8Q/1SE)
- Seeds: 16

Events
Singles	men	women
Doubles	men	women
← 1986 ·	Italian Open	· 1988 →

Ivan Lendl was the defending champion, but lost in third round to Joakim Nyström.

Mats Wilander won the title by defeating Martín Jaite 6–3, 6–4, 6–4 in the final.

== Seeds ==
1. (Czechoslovakia) Ivan Lendl (third round)
2. (Sweden) Mats Wilander (champion)
3. (Czechoslovakia) Miloslav Mečíř (first round)
4. (France) Yannick Noah (first round)
5. (France) Henri Leconte (third round, retired)
6. (United States) John McEnroe (semifinals)
7. (Ecuador) Andrés Gómez (quarterfinals)
8. (Sweden) Kent Carlsson (quarterfinals)
9. (Sweden) Mikael Pernfors (third round)
10. (Spain) Emilio Sánchez (third round)
11. (Argentina) Martín Jaite (final)
12. (Argentina) Guillermo Vilas (first round)
13. (Sweden) Jonas Svensson (second round)
14. (Sweden) Ulf Stenlund (third round)
15. (Sweden) Joakim Nyström (semifinals)
16. (France) Thierry Tulasne (second round)

== Draw ==
=== Key ===
- Q = Qualifier
- WC = Wild card
- LL = Lucky loser
- Alt = Alternate
- ITF = ITF entry
- PR = Protected ranking
- SR = Special ranking
- SE = Special exempt
- JE = Junior exempt
- JR = Junior Accelerator Programme entrant
- CO = College Accelerator Programme entrant
- NG = Next Gen Accelerator Program entrant
- w/o = Walkover
- r = Retired
- d = Defaulted

=== Finals ===
Quarterfinals
15	(Sweden) Joakim Nyström	5	7	6
8	(Sweden) Kent Carlsson	7	5	1
(Italy) Paolo Canè	6	6	4
11	(Argentina) Martín Jaite	3	7	6
6/WC	(United States) John McEnroe	6	6	6
Q	(Switzerland) Claudio Mezzadri	1	7	3
7	(Ecuador) Andrés Gómez	1	6
2	(Sweden) Mats Wilander	6	7

Semifinals
15	(Sweden) Joakim Nyström	3	4
11	(Argentina) Martín Jaite	6	6
6/WC	(United States) John McEnroe	1	3
2	(Sweden) Mats Wilander	6	6

Final
11	(Argentina) Martín Jaite	3	4	4
2	(Sweden) Mats Wilander	6	6	6

=== Top half ===
==== Section 1 ====
First round
1	(Czechoslovakia) I Lendl	6	6
WC	(Italy) C Panatta	2	3
(West Germany) D Keretić	6	7
(France) G Forget	2	6
(Austria) H Skoff	6	6
(Argentina) F Yunis	2	4
Q	(West Germany) H Schwaier	3	0
15	(Sweden) J Nyström	6	6
10	(Spain) E Sánchez	6	6
Q	(Italy) G Pozzi	0	0
Q	(Spain) J Sánchez	6	6
(Czechoslovakia) K Nováček	3	3
(Sweden) J Gunnarsson	4	2
(United States) J Berger	6	6
(Australia) C Limberger	1	0
8	(Sweden) K Carlsson	6	6

Second round
1	(Czechoslovakia) I Lendl	6	6
(West Germany) D Keretić	0	3
(Austria) H Skoff	3	4
15	(Sweden) J Nyström	6	6
10	(Spain) E Sánchez	6	6
Q	(Spain) J Sánchez	2	4
(United States) J Berger	6	3
8	(Sweden) K Carlsson	7	6

Third round
1	(Czechoslovakia) I Lendl	4	6	3
15	(Sweden) J Nyström	6	2	6
10	(Spain) E Sánchez	2	6	1
8	(Sweden) K Carlsson	6	4	6

Quarterfinals
15	(Sweden) J Nyström	5	7	6
8	(Sweden) K Carlsson	7	5	1

==== Section 2 ====
First round
4	(France) Y Noah	5	1
(Argentina) E Bengoechea	7	6
WC	(Italy) C Pistolesi	3	6	3
(Haiti) R Agénor	6	3	6
(Czechoslovakia) T Šmíd	6	3	3
(Italy) P Canè	4	6	6
(Brazil) I Kley	0	2
13	(Sweden) J Svensson	6	6
11	(Argentina) M Jaite	6	5	6
(Sweden) H Sundström	3	7	0
(United States) A Agassi	6	7
(Italy) S Colombo	3	5
Q	(Spain) J López-Maeso	6	4	0
(Spain) S Casal	3	6	6
(France) T Benhabiles	4	4
5	(France) H Leconte	6	6

Second round
(Argentina) E Bengoechea	4	2
(Haiti) R Agénor	6	6
(Italy) P Canè	6	6
13	(Sweden) J Svensson	4	1
11	(Argentina) M Jaite	6	7
(United States) A Agassi	2	5
(Spain) S Casal	6	6	5
5	(France) H Leconte	4	7	7

Third round
(Haiti) R Agénor	6	2	2
(Italy) P Canè	2	6	6
11	(Argentina) M Jaite	6	2
5	(France) H Leconte	2	0^{r}

Quarterfinals
(Italy) P Canè	6	6	4
11	(Argentina) M Jaite	3	7	6

=== Bottom half ===
==== Section 3 ====
First round
6/WC	(United States) J McEnroe	3	6	6
Q	(Argentina) F Davín	6	2	3
(United States) D Rostagno	3	3
(Argentina) H de la Peña	6	6
(Peru) J Yzaga	5	6	7
WC	(Italy) F Cancellotti	7	4	5
(United States) A Krickstein	3	6	6
12	(Argentina) G Vilas	6	0	0
14	(Sweden) U Stenlund	6	6
(Czechoslovakia) M Šrejber	3	4
(United States) J Arias	6	6
Q	(Italy) A de Minicis	2	3
(Austria) T Muster	2	3
Q	(Switzerland) C Mezzadri	6	6
(Sweden) A Järryd	6	3	6
3	(Czechoslovakia) M Mečíř	1	6	4

Second round
6/WC	(United States) J McEnroe	6	6
(Argentina) H de la Peña	2	4
(Peru) J Yzaga	5	1
(United States) A Krickstein	7	6
14	(Sweden) U Stenlund	4	6	6
(United States) J Arias	6	1	1
Q	(Switzerland) C Mezzadri	6	6
(Sweden) A Järryd	2	4

Third round
6/WC	(United States) J McEnroe	4	6	7
(United States) A Krickstein	6	3	5
14	(Sweden) U Stenlund	0	2
Q	(Switzerland) C Mezzadri	6	6

Quarterfinals
6/WC	(United States) J McEnroe	6	6	6
Q	(Switzerland) C Mezzadri	1	7	3

==== Section 4 ====
First round
7	(Ecuador) A Gómez	6	2	6
(United States) J Canter	2	6	3
SE	(Argentina) G Pérez Roldán	6	7
(Spain) J Arrese	4	6
(United States) J Pugh	3	6	6
WC	(Italy) O Camporese	6	2	1
(Czechoslovakia) L Pimek	6	4	2
9	(Sweden) M Pernfors	4	6	6
16	(France) T Tulasne	6	6
(Australia) P McNamee	3	3
(United States) M Purcell	2	6	0
(Brazil) C Motta	6	4	6
Q	(Argentina) A Mancini	4	4
(Brazil) L Mattar	6	6
(Soviet Union) A Chesnokov	2	3
2	(Sweden) M Wilander	6	6

Second round
7	(Ecuador) A Gómez	5	6	6
SE	(Argentina) G Pérez Roldán	7	4	4
(United States) J Pugh	1	3
9	(Sweden) M Pernfors	6	6
16	(France) T Tulasne	1	6	4
(Brazil) C Motta	6	3	6
(Brazil) L Mattar	2	1
2	(Sweden) M Wilander	6	6

Third round
7	(Ecuador) A Gómez	6	6
9	(Sweden) M Pernfors	2	3
(Brazil) C Motta	3	2
2	(Sweden) M Wilander	6	6

Quarterfinals
7	(Ecuador) A Gómez	1	6
2	(Sweden) M Wilander	6	7
