= 1987 Italian Open – Women's doubles =

Women's doubles
- 1987 Italian Open

Final
- Champions: (United States) Martina Navratilova (Argentina) Gabriela Sabatini
- Runners-up: (West Germany) Claudia Kohde-Kilsch (Czechoslovakia) Helena Suková
- Score: 6–4, 6–1

Details
- Draw: 28
- Seeds: 8

Events
Singles	men	women
Doubles	men	women
← 1985 ·	Italian Open	· 1988 →

There was no women's tournament held in the previous year. Sandra Cecchini and Raffaella Reggi were the champions in the 1985 edition. Both players competed this year with different partners. Cecchini teamed up with Sabrina Goleš and lost in the second round to tournament runners-up Claudia Kohde-Kilsch and Helena Suková, while Reggi teamed up with Anne White and lost in the first round to Virginia Ruzici and Catherine Tanvier.

Martina Navratilova and Gabriela Sabatini won the title by defeating Claudia Kohde-Kilsch and Helena Suková 6–4, 6–1 in the final.

== Seeds ==
The first four seeds received a bye to the second round.

1. (United States) Martina Navratilova / (Argentina) Gabriela Sabatini (champions)
2. (West Germany) Claudia Kohde-Kilsch / (Czechoslovakia) Helena Suková (final)
3. (Soviet Union) Svetlana Parkhomenko / (Soviet Union) Larisa Savchenko (quarterfinals)
4. (West Germany) Bettina Bunge / (Peru) Laura Gildemeister (quarterfinals)
5. (Argentina) Mercedes Paz / (West Germany) Eva Pfaff (first round)
6. (Australia) Jenny Byrne / (Australia) Janine Tremelling (semifinals)
7. (Romania) Virginia Ruzici / (France) Catherine Tanvier (semifinals)
8. (Sweden) Catarina Lindqvist / (Denmark) Tine Scheuer-Larsen (quarterfinals)

== Draw ==
=== Key ===
- Q = Qualifier
- WC = Wild card
- LL = Lucky loser
- Alt = Alternate
- ITF = ITF entry
- PR = Protected ranking
- SR = Special ranking
- SE = Special exempt
- JE = Junior exempt
- JR = Junior Accelerator Programme entrant
- CO = College Accelerator Programme entrant
- NG = Next Gen Accelerator Program entrant
- w/o = Walkover
- r = Retired
- d = Defaulted

=== Finals ===
Semifinals
1	(United States) Martina Navratilova (Argentina) Gabriela Sabatini	7	6
6	(Australia) Jenny Byrne (Australia) Janine Tremelling	5	2
7	(Romania) Virginia Ruzici (France) Catherine Tanvier	3	4
2	(West Germany) Claudia Kohde-Kilsch (Czechoslovakia) Helena Suková	6	6

Final
1	(United States) Martina Navratilova (Argentina) Gabriela Sabatini	6	6
2	(West Germany) Claudia Kohde-Kilsch (Czechoslovakia) Helena Suková	4	1

=== Top half ===
First round
(Brazil) N Dias (Brazil) P Medrado	6	7
(West Germany) A Betzner (West Germany) C Singer	2	6
(West Germany) I Cueto (Spain) A Sánchez Vicario	6	6
(Italy) C Nozzoli (Italy) B Romanò	2	2
(France) N Herreman (Bulgaria) K Maleeva	0	1
8	(Sweden) C Lindqvist (Denmark) T Scheuer-Larsen	6	6
(Italy) G Boschiero (Italy) L Lapi	6	4
(United States) MJ Fernández (Canada) H Kelesi	7	6
(Italy) L Ferrando (Italy) Laura Murgo	4	2
(Switzerland) C Bartos-Cserepy (Austria) P Huber	6	6
(Soviet Union) L Meskhi (Soviet Union) N Zvereva	4	6	3
6	(Australia) J Byrne (Australia) J Tremelling	6	2	6

Second round
1	(United States) M Navratilova (Argentina) G Sabatini	6	7
(Brazil) N Dias (Brazil) P Medrado	0	6
(West Germany) I Cueto (Spain) A Sánchez Vicario	6	3
8	(Sweden) C Lindqvist (Denmark) T Scheuer-Larsen	7	6
3	(Soviet Union) S Parkhomenko (Soviet Union) L Savchenko	6	6
(United States) MJ Fernández (Canada) H Kelesi	4	1
(Switzerland) C Bartos-Cserepy (Austria) P Huber	6	3	0
6	(Australia) J Byrne (Australia) J Tremelling	3	6	6

Quarterfinals
1	(United States) M Navratilova (Argentina) G Sabatini	6	6
8	(Sweden) C Lindqvist (Denmark) T Scheuer-Larsen	2	4
3	(Soviet Union) S Parkhomenko (Soviet Union) L Savchenko	6	3	0
6	(Australia) J Byrne (Australia) J Tremelling	3	6	6

Semifinals
1	(United States) M Navratilova (Argentina) G Sabatini	7	6
6	(Australia) J Byrne (Australia) J Tremelling	5	2

=== Bottom half ===
First round
7	(Romania) V Ruzici (France) C Tanvier	6	6
(Italy) R Reggi (United States) A White	4	4
(Czechoslovakia) R Maršíková (West Germany) S Meier	6	5	6
(Czechoslovakia) H Fukárková (Argentina) M Pérez Roldán	3	7	7
(Czechoslovakia) I Budařová (United States) K Horvath	2	1
(France) I Demongeot (France) N Tauziat	6	6
5	(Argentina) M Paz (West Germany) E Pfaff	6	6	3
(Australia) C Carney (United Kingdom) J Salmon	2	7	6
(Argentina) B Fulco (Argentina) P Tarabini	6	0
(Czechoslovakia) J Novotná (France) C Suire	7	6
(Australia) N Provis (Argentina) A Villagrán	2	3
(Italy) S Cecchini (Socialist Federal Republic of Yugoslavia) S Goleš	6	6

Second round
7	(Romania) V Ruzici (France) C Tanvier	6	6
(Czechoslovakia) H Fukárková (Argentina) M Pérez Roldán	1	4
(France) I Demongeot (France) N Tauziat	4	3
4	(West Germany) B Bunge (Peru) L Gildemeister	6	6
(Australia) C Carney (United Kingdom) J Salmon	5	3
(Czechoslovakia) J Novotná (France) C Suire	7	6
(Italy) S Cecchini (Socialist Federal Republic of Yugoslavia) S Goleš	1	2
2	(West Germany) C Kohde-Kilsch (Czechoslovakia) H Suková	6	6

Quarterfinals
7	(Romania) V Ruzici (France) C Tanvier	7	6
4	(West Germany) B Bunge (Peru) L Gildemeister	6	2
(Czechoslovakia) J Novotná (France) C Suire	2	6
2	(West Germany) C Kohde-Kilsch (Czechoslovakia) H Suková	6	7

Semifinals
7	(Romania) V Ruzici (France) C Tanvier	3	4
2	(West Germany) C Kohde-Kilsch (Czechoslovakia) H Suková	6	6
