= 1988 Italian Open (tennis) =

- Date: 9–15 May (men); 2–8 May (women)
- Edition: 45th
- Surface: Clay / outdoor
- Location: Rome, Italy
- Venue: Foro Italico

Champions

Men's singles
- (Czechoslovakia) Ivan Lendl

Women's singles
- (Argentina) Gabriela Sabatini

Men's doubles
- (Mexico) Jorge Lozano / (United States) Todd Witsken

Women's doubles
- (Czechoslovakia) Jana Novotná / (France) Catherine Suire
← 1987 ·	Italian Open	· 1989 →

The 1988 Italian Open was a tennis tournament played on outdoor clay courts at the Foro Italico in Rome in Italy, that was part of the 1988 Nabisco Grand Prix and of Tier IV of the 1988 WTA Tour. The men's tournament was held from 9 May until 15 May 1988, while the women's tournament was held from 2 May until 8 May 1988. First-seeded Ivan Lendl and second-seeded Gabriela Sabatini won the singles titles.

== Finals ==
=== Men's singles ===
(Czechoslovakia) Ivan Lendl defeated (Argentina) Guillermo Pérez Roldán 2–6, 6–4, 6–2, 4–6, 6–4

- It was Lendl's 2nd singles title of the year and the 72nd of his career.

=== Women's singles ===
(Argentina) Gabriela Sabatini defeated (Canada) Helen Kelesi 6–1, 6–7^{(4–7)}, 6–1

- It was Sabatini's 2nd singles title of the year and the 7th of her career.

=== Men's doubles ===
(Mexico) Jorge Lozano / (United States) Todd Witsken defeated (Sweden) Anders Järryd / (Czechoslovakia) Tomáš Šmíd 6–3, 6–3

- It was Lozano's 2nd title of the year and the 2nd of his career. It was Witsken's 2nd title of the year and the 2nd of his career.

=== Women's doubles ===
(Czechoslovakia) Jana Novotná / (France) Catherine Suire defeated (Australia) Jenny Byrne / (Australia) Janine Tremelling 6–3, 4–6, 7–5

- It was Novotná's 2nd title of the year and the 5th of her career. It was Suire's 2nd title of the year and the 5th of her career.
