= 1988 Italian Open – Men's singles =

Men's singles
- 1988 Italian Open

Final
- Champion: (Czechoslovakia) Ivan Lendl
- Runner-up: (Argentina) Guillermo Pérez Roldán
- Score: 2–6, 6–4, 6–2, 4–6, 6–4

Details
- Draw: 64
- Seeds: 16

Events
Singles	men	women
Doubles	men	women
← 1987 ·	Italian Open	· 1989 →

Mats Wilander was the defending champion, but lost in the third round to Ronald Agénor.

Ivan Lendl won the title, defeating Guillermo Pérez Roldán 2–6, 6–4, 6–2, 4–6, 6–4 in the final.

== Seeds ==
1. (Czechoslovakia) Ivan Lendl (champion)
2. (Sweden) Mats Wilander (third round)
3. (West Germany) Boris Becker (first round)
4. (France) Yannick Noah (quarterfinals)
5. (Sweden) Kent Carlsson (semifinals)
6. (Ecuador) Andrés Gómez (quarterfinals)
7. (Sweden) Anders Järryd (third round)
8. (Argentina) Martín Jaite (first round)
9. (United States) Andre Agassi (quarterfinals)
10. (Sweden) Joakim Nyström (first round)
11. (Spain) Emilio Sánchez (first round)
12. N/A
13. (Sweden) Mikael Pernfors (first round)
14. (Argentina) Guillermo Pérez Roldán (final)
15. (Switzerland) Claudio Mezzadri (second round, retired)
16. (United States) Aaron Krickstein (second round)

== Draw ==
=== Key ===
- Q = Qualifier
- WC = Wild card
- LL = Lucky loser
- Alt = Alternate
- SE = Special exempt
- PR = Protected ranking
- ITF = ITF entry
- JE = Junior exempt
- w/o = Walkover
- r = Retired
- d = Defaulted
- SR = Special ranking

=== Finals ===
Quarterfinals
1	(Czechoslovakia) Ivan Lendl	6	4	6
(Peru) Jaime Yzaga	2	6	2
4	(France) Yannick Noah	6	1	4
5	(Sweden) Kent Carlsson	4	6	6
6	(Ecuador) Andrés Gómez	2	3
14	(Argentina) Guillermo Pérez Roldán	6	6
9	(United States) Andre Agassi	3	1
(Haiti) Ronald Agénor	6	6

Semifinals
1	(Czechoslovakia) Ivan Lendl	6	6
5	(Sweden) Kent Carlsson	3	3
14	(Argentina) Guillermo Pérez Roldán	6	6
(Haiti) Ronald Agénor	3	3

Final
1	(Czechoslovakia) Ivan Lendl	2	6	6	4	6
14	(Argentina) Guillermo Pérez Roldán	6	4	2	6	4

=== Top half ===
==== Section 1 ====
First round
1	(Czechoslovakia) I Lendl	6	6
(Czechoslovakia) J Navrátil	2	4
(Czechoslovakia) M Šrejber	7	6
(United States) L Duncan	6	2
WC	(Italy) M Narducci	3	2
(France) G Forget	6	6
WC	(Italy) O Camporese	2	3
15	(Switzerland) C Mezzadri	6	6
10	(Sweden) J Nyström	6	3
(Chile) P Rebolledo	7	6
Q	(United States) L Jensen	2	3
(Peru) J Yzaga	6	6
Q	(Australia) J Stoltenberg	6	5	4
(Italy) P Canè	3	7	6
(Italy) C Aprili	2	1
7	(Sweden) A Järryd	6	6

Second round
1	(Czechoslovakia) I Lendl	6	5	6
(Czechoslovakia) M Šrejber	1	7	1
(France) G Forget	6	1
15	(Switzerland) C Mezzadri	2	0^{r}
(Chile) P Rebolledo	6	3
(Peru) J Yzaga	7	6
(Italy) P Canè	0	0
7	(Sweden) A Järryd	6	6

Third round
1	(Czechoslovakia) I Lendl	6	3	6
(France) G Forget	3	6	3
(Peru) J Yzaga	6	7
7	(Sweden) A Järryd	1	5

Quarterfinals
1	(Czechoslovakia) I Lendl	6	4	6
(Peru) J Yzaga	2	6	2

==== Section 2 ====
First round
4	(France) Y Noah	6	4	6
(Argentina) E Bengoechea	1	6	4
(West Germany) T Meinecke	7	6
(United States) J Arias	5	0
(Sweden) U Stenlund	6	3	2
Q	(Argentina) R Saad	2	6	6
(Czechoslovakia) T Šmíd	6	6
13	(Sweden) M Pernfors	3	1
11	(Spain) E Sánchez	6	6
WC	(Italy) D Nargiso	7	7
(Austria) H Skoff	3	6	6
(West Germany) R Osterthun	6	2	7
(Argentina) G Vilas	6	0	6
(Australia) B Dyke	3	6	0
(West Germany) P Vojtíšek	4	0
5	(Sweden) K Carlsson	6	6

Second round
4	(France) Y Noah	7	6
(West Germany) T Meinecke	6	1
Q	(Argentina) R Saad	4	2
(Czechoslovakia) T Šmíd	6	6
WC	(Italy) D Nargiso	3	6	0
(West Germany) R Osterthun	6	4	6
(Argentina) G Vilas	6	1
5	(Sweden) K Carlsson	7	6

Third round
4	(France) Y Noah	6	6
(Czechoslovakia) T Šmíd	2	2
(West Germany) R Osterthun	1	0
5	(Sweden) K Carlsson	6	6

Quarterfinals
4	(France) Y Noah	6	1	4
5	(Sweden) K Carlsson	4	6	6

=== Bottom half ===
==== Section 3 ====
First round
6	(Ecuador) A Gómez	6	6
(Australia) M Woodforde	2	4
(Netherlands) M Schapers	6	6
Q	(Italy) O Urbinati	3	4
(United States) J Pugh	7	6
(Argentina) A Mancini	5	3
(Netherlands) M Oosting	5	6
LL	(United States) J Grabb	7	7
14	(Argentina) G Pérez Roldán	6	6
(United Kingdom) J Bates	3	2
(Czechoslovakia) M Vajda	3	0
Q	(Uruguay) M Filippini	6	6
(Spain) S Casal	3	6	6
(Argentina) F Davín	6	1	4
(France) T Tulasne	6	7
3	(West Germany) B Becker	4	6

Second round
6	(Ecuador) A Gómez	6	7
(Netherlands) M Schapers	4	6
(United States) J Pugh	6	4	6
LL	(United States) J Grabb	1	6	4
14	(Argentina) G Pérez Roldán	7	7
Q	(Uruguay) M Filippini	5	5
(Spain) S Casal	2	3
(France) T Tulasne	6	6

Third round
6	(Ecuador) A Gómez	4	6	7
(United States) J Pugh	6	3	5
14	(Argentina) G Pérez Roldán	7	7
(France) T Tulasne	5	5

Quarterfinals
6	(Ecuador) A Gómez	2	3
14	(Argentina) G Pérez Roldán	6	6

==== Section 4 ====
First round
8	(Argentina) M Jaite	2	1
(Austria) T Muster	6	6
WC	(Italy) C Panatta	0	7	1
(United States) J Brown	6	6	6
(Sweden) J Gunnarsson	6	6
Q	(Italy) E Rossi	3	4
(Italy) C Pistolesi	6	4	2
9	(United States) A Agassi	4	6	6
16	(United States) A Krickstein	7	6
(Spain) J Sánchez	5	2
(Haiti) R Agénor	3	6	6
WC	(Italy) A Baldoni	6	3	2
Q	(Spain) J Bardou	2	2
(West Germany) C-U Steeb	6	6
(Italy) F Cancellotti	6	1
2	(Sweden) M Wilander	7	6

Second round
(Austria) T Muster	7	6
(United States) J Brown	5	2
(Sweden) J Gunnarsson	6	6	3
9	(United States) A Agassi	3	7	6
16	(United States) A Krickstein	1	1
(Haiti) R Agénor	6	6
(West Germany) C-U Steeb	4	6	3
2	(Sweden) M Wilander	6	4	6

Third round
(Austria) T Muster	4	5
9	(United States) A Agassi	6	7
(Haiti) R Agénor	6	7
2	(Sweden) M Wilander	3	5

Quarterfinals
9	(United States) A Agassi	3	1
(Haiti) R Agénor	6	6
