= 1989 Italian Open (tennis) =

- Date: 15–21 May (men); 8–14 May (women)
- Edition: 46th
- Prize money: $807,500 (men) $300,000 (women)
- Surface: Clay / outdoor
- Location: Rome, Italy
- Venue: Foro Italico

Champions

Men's singles
- (Argentina) Alberto Mancini

Women's singles
- (Argentina) Gabriela Sabatini

Men's doubles
- (United States) Jim Courier / (United States) Pete Sampras

Women's doubles
- (Australia) Elizabeth Smylie / (Australia) Janine Tremelling
← 1988 ·	Italian Open	· 1990 →

The 1989 Italian Open was a tennis tournament played on outdoor clay courts at the Foro Italico in Rome in Italy that was part of the 1989 Nabisco Grand Prix and of the Category 5 tier of the 1989 WTA Tour. The men's tournament was held from 15 May through 21 May 1989, while the women's tournament was played from 8 May through 14 May 1989. Alberto Mancini and Gabriela Sabatini won the singles titles.

== Finals ==
=== Men's singles ===
(Argentina) Alberto Mancini defeated (United States) Andre Agassi 6–3, 4–6, 2–6, 7–6^{(7–2)}, 6–1

- It was Mancini's 2nd and last singles title of the year and the 3rd and last of his career.

=== Women's singles ===
(Argentina) Gabriela Sabatini defeated (Spain) Arantxa Sánchez Vicario 6–2, 5–7, 6–4

- It was Sabatini's 3rd singles title of the year and the 12th of her career.

=== Men's doubles ===
(United States) Jim Courier / (United States) Pete Sampras defeated (Brazil) Danilo Marcelino / (Brazil) Mauro Menezes 6–4, 6–3

- It was Courier's 1st title of the year and the 1st of his career. It was Sampras' only title of the year and the 1st of his career.

=== Women's doubles ===
(Australia) Elizabeth Smylie / (Australia) Janine Tremelling defeated (Netherlands) Manon Bollegraf / (Argentina) Mercedes Paz 6–4, 6–3

- It was Smylie's 4th title of the year and the 25th of her career. It was Tremelling's 2nd title of the year and the 4th of her career.
