= 1989 Italian Open – Women's doubles =

Women's doubles
- 1989 Italian Open
- 1988 Champions: (Czechoslovakia) Jana Novotná; (France) Catherine Suire

Final
- Champions: (Australia) Elizabeth Smylie; (Australia) Janine Tremelling
- Runners-up: (Netherlands) Manon Bollegraf; (Argentina) Mercedes Paz
- Score: 6–4, 6–3

Details
- Draw: 28
- Seeds: 8

Events
| Singles | men | women |
| Doubles | men | women |
| ← 1988 · | Italian Open | · 1990 → |

Jana Novotná and Catherine Suire were the defending champions but only Suire competed that year with Helen Kelesi.

Kelesi and Suire lost in the first round to Sophie Amiach and Lise Gregory.

Elizabeth Smylie and Janine Tremelling won in the final 6–4, 6–3 against Manon Bollegraf and Mercedes Paz.

== Seeds ==
Champion seeds are indicated in bold text while text in italics indicates the round in which those seeds were eliminated. The top five seeded teams received byes into the second round.

1. (France) Isabelle Demongeot / (France) Nathalie Tauziat (second round)
2. (Australia) **Elizabeth Smylie** / (Australia) **Janine Tremelling (champions)**
3. (Australia) Jenny Byrne / (South Africa) Dianne Van Rensburg (semifinals)
4. (Netherlands) Manon Bollegraf / (Argentina) Mercedes Paz (final)
5. (Australia) Nicole Provis / (South Africa) Elna Reinach (quarterfinals)
6. (Canada) Helen Kelesi / (France) Catherine Suire (first round)
7. (Bulgaria) Manuela Maleeva / (Australia) Hana Mandlíková (second round)
8. (Italy) Sandra Cecchini / (Socialist Federal Republic of Yugoslavia) Sabrina Goleš (quarterfinals)

== Draw ==
=== Key ===
- Q = Qualifier
- WC = Wild card
- LL = Lucky loser
- Alt = Alternate
- ITF = ITF entry
- PR = Protected ranking
- SR = Special ranking
- SE = Special exempt
- JE = Junior exempt
- JR = Junior Accelerator Programme entrant
- CO = College Accelerator Programme entrant
- NG = Next Gen Accelerator Program entrant
- w/o = Walkover
- r = Retired
- d = Defaulted

=== Final ===
Final

4
- (Netherlands) Manon Bollegraf
- (Argentina) Mercedes Paz
4
3

2
- (Australia) **Elizabeth Smylie**
- (Australia) **Janine Tremelling**
**6**
**6**

=== Top half ===
First round

Second round

Quarterfinals

Semifinals

1
- (France) I Demongeot
- (France) N Tauziat
3
2

- (France) **A Dechaume**
- (France) **E Derly**
**6**
**6**

- (France) **A Dechaume**
- (France) **E Derly**
**6**
**6**

- (Greece) A Kanellopoulou
- (Austria) B Paulus
4
1

- (France) A Dechaume
- (France) E Derly
3
**6**
5

- (France) J Halard
- (Belgium) S Wasserman
5
**6**
5

- (Switzerland) **C Cohen**
- (Austria) **H Sprung**
**6**
0
**7**

- (Switzerland) **C Cohen**
- (Austria) **H Sprung**
**7**
0
**7**

- (Switzerland) **C Cohen**
- (Austria) **H Sprung**
**w/o**

- (South Africa) A Coetzer
- (Argentina) B Fulco
3
2

7
- (Bulgaria) M Maleeva
- (Australia) H Mandlíková

7
- (Bulgaria) **M Maleeva**
- (Australia) **H Mandlíková**
**6**
**6**

- (Switzerland) C Cohen
- (Austria) H Sprung
4
1

4
- (Netherlands) **M Bollegraf**
- (Argentina) **M Paz**
**6**
**6**

4
- (Netherlands) **M Bollegraf**
- (Argentina) **M Paz**
**7**
**6**

- (Italy) C Caverzasio
- (Italy) S Farina
1
4

- (Australia) L Field
- (France) C Tanvier
5
1

- (Australia) **L Field**
- (France) **C Tanvier**
**6**
**6**

4
- (Netherlands) **M Bollegraf**
- (Argentina) **M Paz**
4
**6**
**6**

- (Italy) L Garrone
- (Italy) L Golarsa
3
1

5
- (Australia) N Provis
- (South Africa) E Reinach
**6**
4
2

- (Italy) **M Grossi**
- (Italy) **B Romanò**
**6**
**6**

- (Italy) M Grossi
- (Italy) B Romanò
6
1

5
- (Australia) **N Provis**
- (South Africa) **E Reinach**
**7**
**6**

=== Bottom half ===
First round

Second round

Quarterfinals

Semifinals

6
- (Canada) H Kelesi
- (France) C Suire
3
**7**
0

- (France) **S Amiach**
- (South Africa) **L Gregory**
**6**
6
**6**

- (France) **S Amiach**
- (South Africa) **L Gregory**
**7**
**6**

- (Australia) J-A Faull
- (Australia) R McQuillan
2
2

- (Spain) A Sánchez
- (Austria) J Wiesner
6
4

- (Spain) **A Sánchez**
- (Austria) **J Wiesner**
**6**
**6**

- (France) S Amiach
- (South Africa) L Gregory
**6**
3
3

- (United States) A Grossman
- (United States) A Leand
5
**6**
1

3
- (Australia) **J Byrne**
- (South Africa) **D Van Rensburg**
4
**6**
**6**

- (Argentina) **G Mosca**
- (Argentina) **A Tiezzi**
**7**
4
**6**

- (Argentina) G Mosca
- (Argentina) A Tiezzi
5
5

3
- (Australia) **J Byrne**
- (South Africa) **D Van Rensburg**
**7**
**7**

3
- (Australia) J Byrne
- (South Africa) D Van Rensburg
1
2

8
(Italy) **S Cecchini**
(Socialist Federal Republic of Yugoslavia) **S Goleš**
**7**
**6**

2
- (Australia) **E Smylie**
- (Australia) **J Tremelling**
**6**
**6**

- (Netherlands) B Schultz
- (United States) J Smoller
5
3

8
(Italy) **S Cecchini**
(Socialist Federal Republic of Yugoslavia) **S Goleš**
2
**6**
**6**

- (Czechoslovakia) **D Krajčovičová**
- (Czechoslovakia) **E Švíglerová**
4
**7**
**6**

- (Czechoslovakia) D Krajčovičová
- (Czechoslovakia) E Švíglerová
**6**
3
3

- (Brazil) L Corsato-Owsianka
- (Brazil) L Tella
**6**
5
3

8
(Italy) S Cecchini
(Socialist Federal Republic of Yugoslavia) S Goleš

- (Brazil) N Dias
- (Italy) L Ferrando
1
3

2
- (Australia) **E Smylie**
- (Australia) **J Tremelling**
**w/o**

- (Czechoslovakia) **P Langrová**
- (Czechoslovakia) **J Pospíšilová**
**6**
**6**

- (Czechoslovakia) P Langrová
- (Czechoslovakia) J Pospíšilová
**6**
2
0

2
- (Australia) **E Smylie**
- (Australia) **J Tremelling**
4
**6**
**6**
