= 1989 Italian Open – Women's singles =

Women's singles
- 1989 Italian Open
- 1988 Champion: (Argentina) Gabriela Sabatini

Final
- Champion: (Argentina) Gabriela Sabatini
- Runner-up: (Spain) Arantxa Sánchez
- Score: 6–2, 5–7, 6–4

Details
- Draw: 56
- Seeds: 16

Events
Singles	men	women
Doubles	men	women
← 1988 ·	Italian Open	· 1990 →

Gabriela Sabatini was the defending champion and won in the final 6–2, 5–7, 6–4 against Arantxa Sánchez.

== Seeds ==
A champion seed is indicated in bold text while text in italics indicates the round in which that seed was eliminated. The top eight seeds received a bye to the second round.

1. (Argentina) **Gabriela Sabatini (champion)**
2. (Bulgaria) Manuela Maleeva (third round)
3. (Canada) Helen Kelesi (third round)
4. (Spain) Arantxa Sánchez (final)
5. (Australia) Hana Mandlíková (third round)
6. (Italy) Sandra Cecchini (quarterfinals)
7. (Austria) Judith Wiesner (quarterfinals)
8. (Italy) Raffaella Reggi (quarterfinals)
9. (United States) Terry Phelps (third round)
10. (Argentina) Bettina Fulco (semifinals)
11. (Australia) Nicole Provis (first round)
12. (France) Isabelle Demongeot (third round)
13. (Austria) Barbara Paulus (third round)
14. (France) Nathalie Tauziat (semifinals)
15. (Brazil) Niege Dias (second round)
16. (United States) Ann Grossman (first round)

== Draw ==
=== Key ===
- Q = Qualifier
- WC = Wild card
- LL = Lucky loser
- Alt = Alternate
- ITF = ITF entry
- PR = Protected ranking
- SR = Special ranking
- SE = Special exempt
- JE = Junior exempt
- JR = Junior Accelerator Programme entrant
- CO = College Accelerator Programme entrant
- NG = Next Gen Accelerator Program entrant
- w/o = Walkover
- r = Retired
- d = Defaulted

=== Finals ===
Semifinals
1	(Argentina) **Gabriela Sabatini**	**6**	**6**
10	(Argentina) Bettina Fulco	3	1
4	(Spain) **Arantxa Sánchez**	**6**	**6**
14	(France) Nathalie Tauziat	1	3

Final
1	(Argentina) **Gabriela Sabatini**	**6**	5	**6**
4	(Spain) Arantxa Sánchez	2	**7**	4

=== Top half ===
==== Section 1 ====
First round
Q	(France) E Derly	**7**	2	1
(Italy) **L Golarsa**	5	**6**	**6**
(Italy) **L Lapi**	**7**	**7**
(Argentina) M Paz	6	5
(Czechoslovakia) **P Langrová**	6	**6**	**6**
11	(Australia) N Provis	**7**	3	0
15	(Brazil) **N Dias**	**6**	**6**
(South Africa) D Van Rensburg	2	1
Q	(Australia) **J Tremelling**	**6**	4	**6**
(France) J Halard	4	**6**	4
Q	(Brazil) L Corsato-Owsianka	5	1
(Australia) **R McQuillan**	**7**	**6**

Second round
1	(Argentina) **G Sabatini**	**6**	**6**
(Italy) L Golarsa	2	2
(Italy) **L Lapi**	**6**	**6**
(Czechoslovakia) P Langrová	3	3
15	(Brazil) N Dias	0	3
Q	(Australia) **J Tremelling**	**6**	**6**
(Australia) R McQuillan	**6**	5	5
6	(Italy) **S Cecchini**	2	**7**	**7**

Third round
1	(Argentina) **G Sabatini**	**6**	6	**6**
(Italy) L Lapi	3	**7**	3
Q	(Australia) J Tremelling	0	2
6	(Italy) **S Cecchini**	**6**	**6**

Quarterfinals
1	(Argentina) **G Sabatini**	**7**	**6**
6	(Italy) S Cecchini	5	1

==== Section 2 ====
First round
WC	(Italy) **S Farina**	**7**	2	**6**
(France) N Guerrée	6	**6**	2
Q	(Switzerland) **C Cohen**	**6**	**6**
LL	(Czechoslovakia) D Krajčovičová	1	3
(Australia) L Field	3	0
10	(Argentina) **B Fulco**	**6**	**6**
13	(Austria) **B Paulus**	4	**6**	**6**
LL	(Greece) O Tsarbopoulou	**6**	1	1
(Czechoslovakia) E Švíglerová	4	3
(South Africa) **A Coetzer**	**6**	**6**
(Belgium) **S Wasserman**	**6**	1	**6**
Q	(France) M-C Damas	1	**6**	1

Second round
3	(Canada) **H Kelesi**	**6**	**6**
WC	(Italy) S Farina	2	2
Q	(Switzerland) C Cohen	4	2
10	(Argentina) **B Fulco**	**6**	**6**
13	(Austria) **B Paulus**	**6**	**6**
(South Africa) A Coetzer	2	4
(Belgium) S Wasserman	4	4
8	(Italy) **R Reggi**	**6**	**6**

Third round
3	(Canada) H Kelesi	3	**6**	3
10	(Argentina) **B Fulco**	**6**	2	**6**
13	(Austria) B Paulus	2	6
8	(Italy) **R Reggi**	**6**	**7**

Quarterfinals
10	(Argentina) **B Fulco**	**6**	**6**
8	(Italy) R Reggi	4	2

=== Bottom half ===
==== Section 3 ====
First round
(Australia) J Byrne	**7**	6	3
Q	(Brazil) **L Tella**	6	**7**	**6**
(Greece) **A Kanellopoulou**	**7**	2	**6**
(Netherlands) N Jagerman	5	**6**	2
(Socialist Federal Republic of Yugoslavia) **S Goleš**	2	**6**	**6**
16	(United States) A Grossman	**6**	2	2
12	(France) **I Demongeot**	**6**	5	**6**
WC	(Italy) N Iaccarino	2	**7**	1
WC	(Italy) **M Grossi**	**6**	**7**
(Netherlands) B Schultz	1	5
(Italy) **L Ferrando**	5	**6**	**6**
Q	(Italy) C Nozzoli	**7**	2	1

Second round
5	(Australia) **H Mandlíková**	**6**	**6**
Q	(Brazil) L Tella	3	0
(Greece) A Kanellopoulou	2	4
(Socialist Federal Republic of Yugoslavia) **S Goleš**	**6**	**6**
12	(France) **I Demongeot**	**6**	**6**
WC	(Italy) M Grossi	4	1
(Italy) L Ferrando	5	1
4	(Spain) **A Sánchez**	**7**	**6**

Third round
5	(Australia) H Mandlíková	**6**	2	r
(Socialist Federal Republic of Yugoslavia) **S Goleš**	1	**5**
12	(France) I Demongeot	2	2
4	(Spain) **A Sánchez**	**6**	**6**

Quarterfinals
(Socialist Federal Republic of Yugoslavia) S Goleš	0	3
4	(Spain) **A Sánchez**	**6**	**6**

==== Section 4 ====
First round
(France) C Tanvier	2	2
(Australia) **J-A Faull**	**6**	**6**
(Italy) L Garrone	1	4
(Italy) **C Caverzasio**	**6**	**6**
(Netherlands) M Bollegraf	4	4
9	(United States) **T Phelps**	**6**	**6**
14	(France) **N Tauziat**	5	**6**	**6**
(France) A Dechaume	**7**	1	1
(Australia) E Smylie	0	1
(South Africa) **E Reinach**	**6**	**6**
(Czechoslovakia) J Pospíšilová	3	2
Q	(Italy) **B Romanò**	**6**	**6**

Second round
7	(Austria) **J Wiesner**	**6**	**7**
(Australia) J-A Faull	3	6
(Italy) C Caverzasio	4	1
9	(United States) **T Phelps**	**6**	**6**
14	(France) **N Tauziat**	4	**6**	**6**
(South Africa) E Reinach	**6**	3	0
Q	(Italy) B Romanò	3	2
2	(Bulgaria) **M Maleeva**	**6**	**6**

Third round
7	(Austria) **J Wiesner**	**6**	**7**
9	(United States) T Phelps	4	6
14	(France) **N Tauziat**	2	**6**	**6**
2	(Bulgaria) M Maleeva	**6**	3	0

Quarterfinals
7	(Austria) J Wiesner	**6**	2	2
14	(France) **N Tauziat**	1	**6**	**6**
