= 1988 Italian Open – Men's doubles =

Men's doubles
- 1988 Italian Open

Final
- Champions: (Mexico) Jorge Lozano (United States) Todd Witsken
- Runners-up: (Sweden) Anders Järryd (Czechoslovakia) Tomáš Šmíd
- Score: 6–3, 6–3

Details
- Draw: 32
- Seeds: 8

Events
Singles	men	women
Doubles	men	women
- Italian Open

Guy Forget and Yannick Noah were the defending champions, but Noah did not compete this year. Forget teamed up with Pat Cash and lost in the quarterfinals to Jorge Lozano and Todd Witsken.

Lozano and Witsken won the title by defeating Anders Järryd and Tomáš Šmíd 6–3, 6–3 in the final.

== Seeds ==
1. (Sweden) Anders Järryd / (Czechoslovakia) Tomáš Šmíd (final)
2. (Spain) Sergio Casal / (Spain) Emilio Sánchez (first round)
3. (Australia) Laurie Warder / (United States) Blaine Willenborg (quarterfinals)
4. (Mexico) Jorge Lozano / (United States) Todd Witsken (champions)
5. (United States) Rick Leach / (United States) Jim Pugh (first round)
6. (Australia) Pat Cash / (France) Guy Forget (quarterfinals)
7. (Sweden) Joakim Nyström / (Sweden) Mats Wilander (semifinals)
8. (Chile) Hans Gildemeister / (Ecuador) Andrés Gómez (first round)

== Draw ==
Key

- Q = Qualifier
- WC = Wild card
- LL = Lucky loser
- Alt = Alternate
- ITF = ITF entry
- PR = Protected ranking
- SR = Special ranking
- SE = Special exempt
- JE = Junior exempt
- JR = Junior Accelerator Programme entrant
- CO = College Accelerator Programme entrant
- NG = Next Gen Accelerator Program entrant
- w/o = Walkover
- r = Retired
- d = Defaulted

=== Finals ===
Semifinals
1	(Sweden) Anders Järryd (Czechoslovakia) Tomáš Šmíd	7	6
(Australia) Wally Masur (Australia) Mark Woodforde	5	2
4	(Mexico) Jorge Lozano (United States) Todd Witsken	6	6
7	(Sweden) Joakim Nyström (Sweden) Mats Wilander	4	2

Final
1	(Sweden) Anders Järryd (Czechoslovakia) Tomáš Šmíd	3	3
4	(Mexico) Jorge Lozano (United States) Todd Witsken	6	6

=== Top half ===
First round
1	(Sweden) A Järryd (Czechoslovakia) T Smid	6	6
(Luxembourg) A Paris (Italy) G Pozzi	3	4
(Sweden) J Gunnarsson (Denmark) M Mortensen	6	7
(Uruguay) M Filippini (Italy) M Fioroni	4	5
(Italy) C Panatta (Netherlands) M Schapers	7	6
(United States) J Brown (United States) L Duncan	5	2
(United States) J Grabb (Argentina) R Saad	6	6
8	(Chile) H Gildemeister (Ecuador) A Gómez	3	3
3	(Australia) L Warder (United States) B Willenborg	7	6
(United States) R Seguso (United States) T Siegel	6	4
(United States) J Arias (United States) L Jensen	4	7	3
(Netherlands) M Oosting (West Germany) C-U Steeb	6	6	6
(United Kingdom) J Bates (Australia) B Dyke	6	7
(United States) R Baxter (United States) P Chamberlin	2	5
(Australia) W Masur (Australia) M Woodforde	6	6
5	(United States) R Leach (United States) J Pugh	1	4

Second round
1	(Sweden) A Järryd (Czechoslovakia) T Smid	6	6
(Sweden) J Gunnarsson (Denmark) M Mortensen	2	1
(Italy) C Panatta (Netherlands) M Schapers	7	7
(United States) J Grabb (Argentina) R Saad	6	5
3	(Australia) L Warder (United States) B Willenborg	6	6
(Netherlands) M Oosting (West Germany) C-U Steeb	1	2
(United Kingdom) J Bates (Australia) B Dyke	6	4	6
(Australia) W Masur (Australia) M Woodforde	3	6	7

Quarterfinals
1	(Sweden) A Järryd (Czechoslovakia) T Smid	6	6
(Italy) C Panatta (Netherlands) M Schapers	2	1
3	(Australia) L Warder (United States) B Willenborg	2	2
(Australia) W Masur (Australia) M Woodforde	6	6

Semifinals
1	(Sweden) A Järryd (Czechoslovakia) T Smid	7	6
(Australia) W Masur (Australia) M Woodforde	5	2

=== Bottom half ===
First round
6	(Australia) P Cash (France) G Forget	6	6
(Austria) T Muster (Italy) G Ocleppo	1	3
(Italy) P Canè (Switzerland) C Mezzadri	3	2
(West Germany) T Meinecke (West Germany) R Osterthun	6	6
(Australia) J Stoltenberg (Australia) T Woodbridge	3	7	6
(United States) C Cox (Czech Republic) M Šrejber	6	6	4
WC	(Italy) C Aprili (Italy) E Rossi	5	1
4	(Mexico) J Lozano (United States) T Witsken	7	6
7	(Sweden) J Nyström (Sweden) M Wilander	6	6
WC	(Italy) P Pennisi (Italy) S Restelli	4	2
WC	(Italy) C Brandi (Italy) C Caratti	7	4	4
(Spain) T Carbonell (Spain) J Sánchez	6	6	6
(Italy) M Cierro (Italy) A de Minicis	6	6
(United States) D Dowlen (United States) M Freeman	3	3
(Italy) O Camporese (Italy) D Nargiso	6	4	6
2	(Spain) S Casal (Spain) E Sánchez	4	6	1

Second round
6	(Australia) P Cash (France) G Forget	6	6
(West Germany) T Meinecke (West Germany) R Osterthun	2	1
(Australia) J Stoltenberg (Australia) T Woodbridge	6	3	5
4	(Mexico) J Lozano (United States) T Witsken	4	6	7
7	(Sweden) J Nyström (Sweden) M Wilander	7	6
(Spain) T Carbonell (Spain) J Sánchez	6	1
(Italy) M Cierro (Italy) A de Minicis	6	6
(Italy) O Camporese (Italy) D Nargiso	2	4

Quarterfinals
6	(Australia) P Cash (France) G Forget	4	3
4	(Mexico) J Lozano (United States) T Witsken	6	6
7	(Sweden) J Nyström (Sweden) M Wilander	6	3	7
(Italy) M Cierro (Italy) A de Minicis	1	6	5

Semifinals
4	(Mexico) J Lozano (United States) T Witsken	6	6
7	(Sweden) J Nyström (Sweden) M Wilander	4	2
