= 1987 Italian Open – Women's singles =

Women's singles
- 1987 Italian Open

Final
- Champion: (West Germany) Steffi Graf
- Runner-up: (Argentina) Gabriela Sabatini
- Score: 7–5, 4–6, 6–0

Details
- Draw: 56 (8Q/1LL)
- Seeds: 16

Events
Singles	men	women
Doubles	men	women
- Italian Open

There was no women's tournament held in the previous year. Rafaella Reggi was the champion in the 1985 edition. She lost in the second round to Arantxa Sánchez Vicario.

Steffi Graf won the title by defeating Gabriela Sabatini 7–5, 4–6, 6–0 in the final.

== Seeds ==
The first eight seeds received a bye to the second round.

1. (United States) Martina Navratilova (semifinals)
2. (West Germany) Steffi Graf (champion)
3. (Czechoslovakia) Helena Suková (semifinals)
4. (Argentina) Gabriela Sabatini (final)
5. (West Germany) Claudia Kohde-Kilsch (quarterfinals)
6. (West Germany) Bettina Bunge (second round)
7. (Sweden) Catarina Lindqvist (second round)
8. (Bulgaria) Katerina Maleeva (third round)
9. (West Germany) Sylvia Hanika (first round)
10. (Italy) Raffaella Reggi (second round)
11. (United States) Mary Joe Fernández (third round)
12. (Soviet Union) Larisa Savchenko (first round, retired)
13. (Canada) Helen Kelesi (first round)
14. (France) Catherine Tanvier (second round)

== Draw ==
Key

- Q = Qualifier
- WC = Wild card
- LL = Lucky loser
- Alt = Alternate
- ITF = ITF entry
- PR = Protected ranking
- SR = Special ranking
- SE = Special exempt
- JE = Junior exempt
- JR = Junior Accelerator Programme entrant
- CO = College Accelerator Programme entrant
- NG = Next Gen Accelerator Program entrant
- w/o = Walkover
- r = Retired
- d = Defaulted

=== Finals ===
Quarterfinals
1	(United States) Martina Navratilova	6	6
5	(West Germany) Claudia Kohde-Kilsch	2	3
4	(Argentina) Gabriela Sabatini	6	6
(Spain) Arantxa Sánchez Vicario	0	0
(Austria) Judith Pölzl	4	2
3	(Czechoslovakia) Helena Suková	6	6
(Argentina) Bettina Fulco	4	4
2	(West Germany) Steffi Graf	6	6

Semifinals
1	(United States) Martina Navratilova	6	1
4	(Argentina) Gabriela Sabatini	7	6
3	(Czechoslovakia) Helena Suková	3	3
2	(West Germany) Steffi Graf	6	6

Final
4	(Argentina) Gabriela Sabatini	5	6	0
2	(West Germany) Steffi Graf	7	4	6

=== Top half ===
==== Section 1 ====
First round
Q	(Czechoslovakia) I Budařová	4	6	5
(Socialist Federal Republic of Yugoslavia) S Goleš	6	3	7
(France) C Suire	6	6
(Italy) L Lapi	3	2
Q	(Czechoslovakia) R Zrubáková	6	6
Q	(Soviet Union) L Meskhi	3	0
14	(France) C Tanvier	6	6
(Soviet Union) S Parkhomenko	3	3
(France) N Tauziat	6	6
(Brazil) P Medrado	1	4
Q	(Italy) L Ferrando	1	6	6
Q	(West Germany) A Betzner	6	2	3

Second round
1	(United States) M Navratilova	7	7
(Socialist Federal Republic of Yugoslavia) S Goleš	6	6
(France) C Suire	1	1
Q	(Czechoslovakia) R Zrubáková	6	6
14	(France) C Tanvier	0	6
(France) N Tauziat	6	7
Q	(Italy) L Ferrando	3	5
5	(West Germany) C Kohde-Kilsch	6	7

Third round
1	(United States) M Navratilova	6	6
Q	(Czechoslovakia) R Zrubáková	2	3
(France) N Tauziat	1	1
5	(West Germany) C Kohde-Kilsch	6	6

Quarterfinals
1	(United States) M Navratilova	6	6
5	(West Germany) C Kohde-Kilsch	2	3

==== Section 2 ====
First round
(France) MC Calleja	6	4	6
(France) I Demongeot	3	6	4
(Brazil) N Dias	6	6	1
(Argentina) A Villagrán	2	7	6
(Czechoslovakia) J Novotná	2	4
11	(United States) MJ Fernández	6	6
10	(Italy) R Reggi	6	6
(Argentina) P Tarabini	1	4
(Italy) C Nozzoli	6	1
(Spain) A Sánchez Vicario	7	6
(West Germany) I Cueto	6	6
(Italy) Annalla Dell'Orso	2	1

Second round
4	(Argentina) G Sabatini	6	6
(France) MC Calleja	2	1
(Argentina) A Villagrán	2	3
11	(United States) MJ Fernández	6	6
10	(Italy) R Reggi	6	2	3
(Spain) A Sánchez Vicario	1	6	6
(West Germany) I Cueto	7	6
7	(Sweden) C Lindqvist	6	4

Third round
4	(Argentina) G Sabatini	6	6
11	(United States) MJ Fernández	1	3
(Spain) A Sánchez Vicario	6	6
(West Germany) I Cueto	3	1

Quarterfinals
4	(Argentina) G Sabatini	6	6
(Spain) A Sánchez Vicario	0	0

=== Bottom half ===
==== Section 3 ====
First round
(France) N Herreman	6	1	3
(Austria) J Pölzl	3	6	6
(Italy) F Bonsignori	6	6
LL	(Australia) J Byrne	1	3
Q	(Austria) B Paulus	7	6
9	(West Germany) S Hanika	6	3
13	(Canada) H Kelesi	7	6	4
Q	(Soviet Union) N Bykova	6	7	6
(United States) A White	4	6	2
(Australia) J Tremelling	6	3	6
(Czechoslovakia) R Maršíková	6	7
(Denmark) T Scheuer-Larsen	1	6

Second round
6	(West Germany) B Bunge	6	3	4
(Austria) J Pölzl	4	6	6
(Italy) F Bonsignori	0	3
Q	(Austria) B Paulus	6	6
Q	(Soviet Union) N Bykova	7	6
(Australia) J Tremelling	5	2
(Czechoslovakia) R Maršíková	6	5
3	(Czechoslovakia) H Suková	7	7

Third round
(Austria) J Pölzl	6	6
Q	(Austria) B Paulus	2	1
Q	(Soviet Union) N Bykova	6	0
3	(Czechoslovakia) H Suková	7	6

Quarterfinals
(Austria) J Pölzl	4	2
3	(Czechoslovakia) H Suková	6	6

==== Section 4 ====
First round
Q	(West Germany) C Singer	4	2
(Switzerland) C Bartos-Cserepy	6	6
(Argentina) B Fulco	6	6
(West Germany) S Meier	4	2
(Argentina) M Pérez Roldán	4	7	6
(Romania) V Ruzici	6	6	7
12	(Soviet Union) L Savchenko	2	0^{r}
(Soviet Union) N Zvereva	6	3
(Italy) S Cecchini	6	7
(Greece) A Kanellopoulou	1	5
(Austria) P Huber	6	6
(United States) K Horvath	2	1

Second round
8	(Bulgaria) K Maleeva	6	6
(Switzerland) C Bartos-Cserepy	2	1
(Argentina) B Fulco	6	6
(Romania) V Ruzici	1	1
(Soviet Union) N Zvereva	6	2
(Italy) S Cecchini	7	6
(Austria) P Huber	2	2
2	(West Germany) S Graf	6	6

Third round
8	(Bulgaria) K Maleeva	4	6
(Argentina) B Fulco	6	7
(Italy) S Cecchini	1	5
2	(West Germany) S Graf	6	7

Quarterfinals
(Argentina) B Fulco	4	4
2	(West Germany) S Graf	6	6
