= 1992 Open Seat of Spain – Doubles =

Doubles
- 1992 Open Seat of Spain

Final
- Champions: (Spain) Conchita Martínez (Spain) Arantxa Sánchez Vicario
- Runners-up: (France) Nathalie Tauziat (Austria) Judith Wiesner
- Score: 6–4, 6–1

Details
- Draw: 16 (1WC/1Q)
- Seeds: 4

Events
| Singles | Doubles |
| ← 1991 · | Spanish Open | · 1993 → |

Martina Navratilova and Arantxa Sánchez Vicario were the defending champions, but Navratilova did not compete this year.

Sánchez Vicario teamed up with Conchita Martínez and won her third consecutive title at Barcelona, by defeating Nathalie Tauziat and Judith Wiesner 6–4, 6–1 in the final.

== Seeds ==
1. (Spain) Conchita Martínez / (Spain) Arantxa Sánchez Vicario (champions)
2. (France) Nathalie Tauziat / (Austria) Judith Wiesner (final)
3. (France) Alexia Dechaume / (France) Julie Halard (semifinals)
4. (France) Mary Pierce / (Czechoslovakia) Radka Zrubáková (semifinals)

== Draw ==
Key

- Q = Qualifier
- WC = Wild card
- LL = Lucky loser
- Alt = Alternate
- ITF = ITF entry
- PR = Protected ranking
- SR = Special ranking
- SE = Special exempt
- JE = Junior exempt
- JR = Junior Accelerator Programme entrant
- CO = College Accelerator Programme entrant
- NG = Next Gen Accelerator Program entrant
- w/o = Walkover
- r = Retired
- d = Defaulted

=== Draw ===
First round
1 | (Spain) C Martínez (Spain) A Sánchez Vicario | 6 | 6
(Greece) J Apostoli (France) N Herreman | 2 | 1
(France) N Ballet (France) Agnes Romand | 6 | 4 | 0
(Spain) A Segura (Spain) J Souto | 1 | 6 | 6
3 | (France) A Dechaume (France) J Halard | 6 | 6
(Finland) P Thorén (Switzerland) E Zardo | 1 | 1
(Italy) L Garrone (Argentina) I Gorrochategui | 6 | 6
(Spain) R Bielsa (Spain) S Ramón-Cortés | 1 | 3
(France) S Niox-Château (Romania) I Spîrlea | 7 | 5 | 6^{1}
(Spain) E Bes (Spain) V Ruano Pascual | 5 | 7 | 7^{7}
WC | (Bolivia) Carla Jiménez (Spain) Ainhoa Torrens | 1 | 0
4 | (France) M Pierce (Czechoslovakia) R Zrubáková | 6 | 6
Q | (Spain) Vanessa Castellano (Spain) A Ortuño | 0 | 2
(Netherlands) N Muns-Jagerman (Germany) W Probst | 6 | 6
(Spain) E Bottini (Spain) B Navarro | 6 | 2 | 5
2 | (France) N Tauziat (Austria) J Wiesner | 4 | 6 | 7

Quarterfinals
1 | (Spain) C Martínez (Spain) A Sánchez Vicario | 6 | 6
(Spain) A Segura (Spain) J Souto | 0 | 3
3 | (France) A Dechaume (France) J Halard | 3 | 6 | 6
(Italy) L Garrone (Argentina) I Gorrochategui | 6 | 0 | 4
(Spain) E Bes (Spain) V Ruano Pascual | 0 | 1
4 | (France) M Pierce (Czechoslovakia) R Zrubáková | 6 | 6
(Netherlands) N Muns-Jagerman (Germany) W Probst | 3 | 6^{1}
2 | (France) N Tauziat (Austria) J Wiesner | 6 | 7^{7}

Semifinals
1 | (Spain) C Martínez (Spain) A Sánchez Vicario | 6 | 6
3 | (France) A Dechaume (France) J Halard | 2 | 3
4 | (France) M Pierce (Czechoslovakia) R Zrubáková | 6^{6} | 6^{6}
2 | (France) N Tauziat (Austria) J Wiesner | 7^{8} | 7^{8}

Final
1 | (Spain) C Martínez (Spain) A Sánchez Vicario | 6 | 6
2 | (France) N Tauziat (Austria) J Wiesner | 4 | 1
