= 1994 International Championships of Spain – Singles =

Singles
- 1994 International Championships of Spain

Final
- Champion: (Spain) Arantxa Sánchez Vicario
- Runner-up: (Croatia) Iva Majoli
- Score: 6–0, 6–2

Details
- Draw: 32 (2WC/4Q/1LL)
- Seeds: 8

Events
| Singles | Doubles |
| ← 1993 · | Spanish Open | · 1995 → |

Arantxa Sánchez Vicario successfully defended her title, by defeating Iva Majoli 6–0, 6–2 in the final.

== Seeds ==
1. (Spain) Arantxa Sánchez Vicario (champion)
2. (Spain) Conchita Martínez (quarterfinals)
3. (Bulgaria) Magdalena Maleeva (semifinals)
4. (Germany) Sabine Hack (semifinals)
5. (France) Nathalie Tauziat (second round)
6. (Croatia) Iva Majoli (final)
7. (Bulgaria) Katerina Maleeva (first round)
8. (France) Julie Halard (quarterfinals)

== Draw ==
=== Key ===
- Q = Qualifier
- WC = Wild card
- LL = Lucky loser
- Alt = Alternate
- SE = Special exempt
- PR = Protected ranking
- ITF = ITF entry
- JE = Junior exempt
- w/o = Walkover
- r = Retired
- d = Defaulted
- SR = Special ranking

=== Finals ===
Semifinals
1 | (Spain) Arantxa Sánchez Vicario | 6 | 6
4 | (Germany) Sabine Hack | 0 | 1
3 | (Bulgaria) Magdalena Maleeva | 7 | 4 | 2
6 | (Croatia) Iva Majoli | 5 | 6 | 6

Final
1 | (Spain) Arantxa Sánchez Vicario | 6 | 6
6 | (Croatia) Iva Majoli | 0 | 2

=== Top half ===
First round
1 | (Spain) A Sánchez Vicario | 6 | 6
Q | (Germany) K Oeljeklaus | 2 | 1
(Germany) S Frankl | 3 | 3
Q | (Argentina) M Paz | 6 | 6
Q | (Spain) S Ramón | 5 | 4
(Ukraine) E Brioukhovets | 7 | 6
(Italy) M Grossi | 1 | 3
8 | (France) J Halard | 6 | 6
4 | (Germany) S Hack | 6 | 6
(France) K Quentrec | 4 | 1
(France) A Fusai | 6 | 6
LL | (Spain) N Ávila | 2 | 2
(Italy) F Bonsignori | 4 | 2
(Argentina) P Tarabini | 6 | 6
WC | (Spain) Á Montolio | 6 | 2 | 2
5 | (France) N Tauziat | 4 | 6 | 6

Second round
1 | (Spain) A Sánchez Vicario | 6 | 6
Q | (Argentina) M Paz | 2 | 0
(Ukraine) E Brioukhovets | 0 | 2
8 | (France) J Halard | 6 | 6
4 | (Germany) S Hack | 6 | 6
(France) A Fusai | 2 | 1
(Argentina) P Tarabini | 6 | 6
5 | (France) N Tauziat | 4 | 3

Quarterfinals
1 | (Spain) A Sánchez Vicario | 6 | 7
8 | (France) J Halard | 1 | 5
4 | (Germany) S Hack | 6 | 6
(Argentina) P Tarabini | 4 | 3

Semifinals
1 | (Spain) A Sánchez Vicario | 6 | 6
4 | (Germany) S Hack | 0 | 1

=== Bottom half ===
First round
7 | (Bulgaria) K Maleeva | 3 | 5
(United States) A Grossman | 6 | 7
(Canada) H Kelesi | 3 | 4
Q | (Croatia) M Palaveršić | 6 | 6
(France) N van Lottum | 6 | 1 | 6
(Argentina) MJ Gaidano | 4 | 6 | 3
(Italy) L Ferrando | 5 | 6^{2}
3 | (Bulgaria) M Maleeva | 7 | 7^{7}
6 | (Croatia) I Majoli | 6 | 6
(Czech Republic) K Kroupová | 2 | 2
WC | (Spain) M Sánchez Lorenzo | 6 | 3 | 6
(Italy) L Golarsa | 3 | 6 | 2
(Croatia) N Ercegović | 4 | 2
(Italy) S Cecchini | 6 | 6
(Germany) W Probst | 5 | 3
2 | (Spain) C Martínez | 7 | 6

Second round
(United States) A Grossman | 6 | 6
Q | (Croatia) M Palaveršić | 2 | 4
(France) N van Lottum | 0 | 3
3 | (Bulgaria) M Maleeva | 6 | 6
6 | (Croatia) I Majoli | 6 | 2 | 6
WC | (Spain) M Sánchez Lorenzo | 2 | 6 | 3
(Italy) S Cecchini | 2 | 3
2 | (Spain) C Martínez | 6 | 6

Quarterfinals
(United States) A Grossman | 0 | 0
3 | (Bulgaria) M Maleeva | 6 | 6
6 | (Croatia) I Majoli | 6 | 6
2 | (Spain) C Martínez | 4 | 3

Semifinals
3 | (Bulgaria) M Maleeva | 7 | 4 | 2
6 | (Croatia) I Majoli | 5 | 6 | 6
