= 1991 International Championships of Spain – Doubles =

Doubles
- 1991 International Championships of Spain

Final
- Champions: (United States) Martina Navratilova (Spain) Arantxa Sánchez Vicario
- Runners-up: (France) Nathalie Tauziat (Austria) Judith Wiesner
- Score: 6–1, 6–3

Details
- Draw: 28 (2WC/1Q)
- Seeds: 8

Events
Singles	Doubles
← 1990 ·	Spanish Open	· 1992 →

Mercedes Paz and Arantxa Sánchez Vicario were the defending champions, but Paz did not compete this year.

Sánchez Vicario teamed up with Martina Navratilova and successfully defended her title, by defeating Nathalie Tauziat and Judith Wiesner 6–1, 6–3 in the final.

== Seeds ==
The top four seeds received a bye to the second round.

1. (United States) Martina Navratilova / (Spain) Arantxa Sánchez Vicario (champions)
2. (France) Nathalie Tauziat / (Austria) Judith Wiesner (final)
3. (Australia) Rachel McQuillan / (France) Catherine Tanvier (semifinals)
4. (Argentina) Bettina Fulco / (Argentina) Patricia Tarabini (quarterfinals)
5. (France) Alexia Dechaume / (Germany) Wiltrud Probst (quarterfinals)
6. (France) Isabelle Demongeot / (Spain) Conchita Martínez (semifinals)
7. (Netherlands) Carin Bakkum / (Netherlands) Nicole Jagerman (quarterfinals)
8. (Italy) Silvia Farina / (Belgium) Sandra Wasserman (second round)

== Draw ==
=== Key ===
- Q = Qualifier
- WC = Wild card
- LL = Lucky loser
- Alt = Alternate
- ITF = ITF entry
- PR = Protected ranking
- SR = Special ranking
- SE = Special exempt
- JE = Junior exempt
- JR = Junior Accelerator Programme entrant
- CO = College Accelerator Programme entrant
- NG = Next Gen Accelerator Program entrant
- w/o = Walkover
- r = Retired
- d = Defaulted

=== Finals ===
Semifinals
1	(United States) Martina Navratilova (Spain) Arantxa Sánchez Vicario	6	6
3	(Australia) Rachel McQuillan (France) Catherine Tanvier	1	3
6	(France) Isabelle Demongeot (Spain) Conchita Martínez	6	5	3
2	(France) Nathalie Tauziat (Austria) Judith Wiesner	1	7	6

Final
1	(United States) Martina Navratilova (Spain) Arantxa Sánchez Vicario	6	6
2	(France) Nathalie Tauziat (Austria) Judith Wiesner	1	3

=== Top half ===
First round
(Switzerland) C Cohen (Germany) S Frankl	6	4	6
(Japan) M Kidowaki (France) N van Lottum	3	6	1
(Italy) K Piccolini (Argentina) C Tessi	7^{7}	3	6
WC	(Spain) Marta Cruells-López (Spain) A Ortuño	6^{4}	6	3
WC	(United States) B Bowes (Australia) T Morton	4	0
5	(France) A Dechaume (Germany) W Probst	6	6
(Spain) E Bottini (Spain) B Navarro	7^{7}	7^{7}
(Germany) S Auer (Germany) K Düll	6^{4}	6^{1}
(United Kingdom) S Gomer (United States) A Gooden	6	7^{7}
(Spain) N Ávila (Belgium) D Monami	1	6^{4}
(France) N Guerrée (France) K Quentrec	6^{4}	5
8	(Italy) S Farina (Belgium) S Wasserman	7^{7}	7

Second round
1	(United States) M Navratilova (Spain) A Sánchez Vicario	6	6
(Switzerland) C Cohen (Germany) S Frankl	1	1
(Italy) K Piccolini (Argentina) C Tessi	0	1
5	(France) A Dechaume (Germany) W Probst	6	6
3	(Australia) R McQuillan (France) C Tanvier	6	6
(Spain) E Bottini (Spain) B Navarro	3	2
(United Kingdom) S Gomer (United States) A Gooden	6	6
8	(Italy) S Farina (Belgium) S Wasserman	1	2

Quarterfinals
1	(United States) M Navratilova (Spain) A Sánchez Vicario	6	6
5	(France) A Dechaume (Germany) W Probst	4	4
3	(Australia) R McQuillan (France) C Tanvier	7^{7}	6
(United Kingdom) S Gomer (United States) A Gooden	6^{3}	2

Semifinals
1	(United States) M Navratilova (Spain) A Sánchez Vicario	6	6
3	(Australia) R McQuillan (France) C Tanvier	1	3

=== Bottom half ===
First round
6	(France) I Demongeot (Spain) C Martínez	6	6
(Spain) E Bes (Spain) V Ruano Pascual	3	4
(France) J Halard (France) N Herreman	7^{7}	7^{7}
(Spain) MJ Llorca (Spain) A Segura	6^{4}	6^{1}
Q	(France) P Etchemendy (France) M Laval	4	5
(Greece) A Kanellopoulou (United States) A Schwartz	6	7
7	(Netherlands) C Bakkum (Netherlands) N Jagerman	6	6^{10}	6
(Japan) A Kijimuta (Soviet Union) V Milvidskaia	1	7^{12}	2
(Spain) J Souto (Spain) N Souto	6	1	3
(Sweden) M Strandlund (Brazil) A Vieira	4	6	6
(Spain) M Martínez Pérez (Spain) I Varas	1	2
(Brazil) C Chabalgoity (Argentina) F Labat	6	6

Second round
6	(France) I Demongeot (Spain) C Martínez	6	6
(France) J Halard (France) N Herreman	2	1
(Greece) A Kanellopoulou (United States) A Schwartz	6^{5}	1
4	(Argentina) B Fulco (Argentina) P Tarabini	7^{7}	6
7	(Netherlands) C Bakkum (Netherlands) N Jagerman	6	6
(Sweden) M Strandlund (Brazil) A Vieira	3	1
(Brazil) C Chabalgoity (Argentina) F Labat	2	3
2	(France) N Tauziat (Austria) J Wiesner	6	6

Quarterfinals
6	(France) I Demongeot (Spain) C Martínez	6	6
4	(Argentina) B Fulco (Argentina) P Tarabini	3	3
7	(Netherlands) C Bakkum (Netherlands) N Jagerman	3	2
2	(France) N Tauziat (Austria) J Wiesner	6	6

Semifinals
6	(France) I Demongeot (Spain) C Martínez	6	5	3
2	(France) N Tauziat (Austria) J Wiesner	1	7	6
