= 1992 Open Seat of Spain – Singles =

Singles
- 1992 Open Seat of Spain

Final
- Champion: (Socialist Federal Republic of Yugoslavia) Monica Seles
- Runner-up: (Spain) Arantxa Sánchez Vicario
- Score: 3–6, 6–2, 6–3

Details
- Draw: 28 (2WC/4Q/1LL)
- Seeds: 8

Events
Singles	Doubles
← 1991 ·	Spanish Open	· 1993 →

Conchita Martínez was the defending champion, but lost in the semifinals to Arantxa Sánchez Vicario.

Monica Seles won the title by defeating Sánchez Vicario 3–6, 6–2, 6–3 in the final.

== Seeds ==
The top four seeds received a bye to the second round.

1. (Socialist Federal Republic of Yugoslavia) Monica Seles (champion)
2. (Spain) Arantxa Sánchez Vicario (final)
3. (Spain) Conchita Martínez (semifinals)
4. (Switzerland) Manuela Maleeva-Fragnière (semifinals)
5. (France) Nathalie Tauziat (quarterfinals)
6. (France) Mary Pierce (quarterfinals)
7. (Austria) Judith Wiesner (first round)
8. (France) Julie Halard (quarterfinals)

== Draw ==
Key

- Q = Qualifier
- WC = Wild card
- LL = Lucky loser
- Alt = Alternate
- ITF = ITF entry
- PR = Protected ranking
- SR = Special ranking
- SE = Special exempt
- JE = Junior exempt
- JR = Junior Accelerator Programme entrant
- CO = College Accelerator Programme entrant
- NG = Next Gen Accelerator Program entrant
- w/o = Walkover
- r = Retired
- d = Defaulted

=== Finals ===
Semifinals
1	(Socialist Federal Republic of Yugoslavia) Monica Seles	6	6
4	(Switzerland) Manuela Maleeva-Fragnière	3	1
3	(Spain) Conchita Martínez	1	2
2	(Spain) Arantxa Sánchez Vicario	6	6

Final
1	(Socialist Federal Republic of Yugoslavia) Monica Seles	3	6	6
2	(Spain) Arantxa Sánchez Vicario	6	2	3

=== Top half ===
First round
(Netherlands) N Muns-Jagerman	6	3	6
(France) C Mothes	2	6	1
WC	(Spain) E Bes	3	4
(Finland) P Thorén	6	6
(Italy) S Farina	1	0
6	(France) M Pierce	6	6
(France) S Niox-Château	6^{3}	5
(Italy) L Garrone	7^{7}	7
(Germany) K Oeljeklaus	1	4
(Italy) F Bonsignori	6	6
Q	(Germany) W Probst	6	1	6
7	(Austria) J Wiesner	1	6	3

Second round
1	(Socialist Federal Republic of Yugoslavia) M Seles	6	6
(Netherlands) N Muns-Jagerman	3	1
(Finland) P Thorén	2	1
6	(France) M Pierce	6	6
4	(Switzerland) M Maleeva-Fragnière	6	6
(Italy) L Garrone	2	4
(Italy) F Bonsignori	1	3
Q	(Germany) W Probst	6	6

Quarterfinals
1	(Socialist Federal Republic of Yugoslavia) M Seles	7^{8}	6
6	(France) M Pierce	6^{6}	4
4	(Switzerland) M Maleeva-Fragnière	6	6
Q	(Germany) W Probst	3	4

Semifinals
1	(Socialist Federal Republic of Yugoslavia) M Seles	6	6
4	(Switzerland) M Maleeva-Fragnière	3	1

=== Bottom half ===
First round
5	(France) N Tauziat	3	7^{7}	6
WC	(Spain) E Bottini	6	6^{3}	2
Q	(Spain) V Ruano Pascual	1	4
(France) A Dechaume	6	6
Q	(Romania) I Spîrlea	5	7^{7}	4
LL	(France) N Guerrée	7	6^{3}	6
8	(France) J Halard	6	6
(France) N Herreman	4	4
Q	(Spain) B Navarro	6^{8}	0
(Argentina) I Gorrochategui	7^{10}	6
(Czechoslovakia) R Zrubáková	6	6
(Switzerland) E Zardo	1	0

Second round
5	(France) N Tauziat	6	6
(France) A Dechaume	4	4
LL	(France) N Guerrée	1	0
3	(Spain) C Martínez	6	6
8	(France) J Halard	7^{9}	2	6
(Argentina) I Gorrochategui	6^{7}	6	3
(Czechoslovakia) R Zrubáková	1	4
2	(Spain) A Sánchez Vicario	6	6

Quarterfinals
5	(France) N Tauziat	5	1
3	(Spain) C Martínez	7	6
8	(France) J Halard	2	3
2	(Spain) A Sánchez Vicario	6	6

Semifinals
3	(Spain) C Martínez	1	2
2	(Spain) A Sánchez Vicario	6	6
