= 1994 International Championships of Spain – Doubles =

Doubles
- 1994 International Championships of Spain

Final
- Champions: (Latvia) Larisa Neiland (Spain) Arantxa Sánchez Vicario
- Runners-up: (France) Julie Halard (France) Nathalie Tauziat
- Score: 6–2, 6–4

Details
- Draw: 16 (1WC/1Q)
- Seeds: 4

Events
| Singles | Doubles |
| ← 1993 · | Spanish Open | · 1995 → |

Conchita Martínez and Arantxa Sánchez Vicario were the defending champions, but competed this year with different partners.

Martínez teamed up with Magdalena Maleeva and withdrew from the first round match against Karine Quentrec and Noëlle van Lottum.

Sánchez Vicario teamed up with Larisa Neiland and successfully defended her title, by defeating Julie Halard and Nathalie Tauziat 6–2, 6–4 in the final.

== Seeds ==
1. (Latvia) Larisa Neiland / (Spain) Arantxa Sánchez Vicario (champions)
2. (Italy) Sandra Cecchini / (Argentina) Patricia Tarabini (first round)
3. (Bulgaria) Magdalena Maleeva / (Spain) Conchita Martínez (first round, withdrew)
4. (Italy) Laura Golarsa / (Argentina) Mercedes Paz (semifinals)

== Draw ==
=== Key ===
- Q = Qualifier
- WC = Wild card
- LL = Lucky loser
- Alt = Alternate
- SE = Special exempt
- PR = Protected ranking
- ITF = ITF entry
- JE = Junior exempt
- w/o = Walkover
- r = Retired
- d = Defaulted
- SR = Special ranking

=== Draw ===
First round
1 | (Latvia) L Neiland (Spain) A Sánchez Vicario | 6 | 6
Q | (Netherlands) S Noorlander (Canada) S Jeyaseelan | 0 | 1
(Argentina) B Fulco Villella (Spain) V Ruano Pascual | 3 | 3
(Croatia) I Majoli (Germany) W Probst | 6 | 6
4 | (Italy) L Golarsa (Argentina) M Paz | 7^{7} | 6
(Italy) L Ferrando (Bulgaria) K Maleeva | 6^{3} | 3
(Germany) K Freye (Czechoslovakia) P Rajzlová | 6^{5} | 2
WC | (Spain) G León García (Spain) J Souto | 7^{7} | 6
(Argentina) M Díaz Oliva (Spain) A Ortuño | 5 | 7^{7} | 2
(Germany) S Hack (Germany) C Schneider | 7 | 6^{4} | 6
(France) K Quentrec (France) N van Lottum | w/o
3 | (Bulgaria) M Maleeva (Spain) C Martínez
(France) A Fusai (Argentina) MJ Gaidano | 5 | 6^{8}
(United States) A Grossman (Netherlands) C Vis | 7 | 7^{10}
(France) J Halard (France) N Tauziat | 6^{4} | 6 | 7^{7}
2 | (Italy) S Cecchini (Argentina) P Tarabini | 7^{7} | 4 | 6^{1}

Quarterfinals
1 | (Latvia) L Neiland (Spain) A Sánchez Vicario | 6 | 6
(Croatia) I Majoli (Germany) W Probst | 4 | 3
4 | (Italy) L Golarsa (Argentina) M Paz | 6 | 6
WC | (Spain) G León García (Spain) J Souto | 1 | 2
(Germany) S Hack (Germany) C Schneider | 6 | 6
(France) K Quentrec (France) N van Lottum | 0 | 2
(United States) A Grossman (Netherlands) C Vis | 6 | 1 | 4
(France) J Halard (France) N Tauziat | 4 | 6 | 6

Semifinals
1 | (Latvia) L Neiland (Spain) A Sánchez Vicario | 6 | 6
4 | (Italy) L Golarsa (Argentina) M Paz | 4 | 3
(Germany) S Hack (Germany) C Schneider | 4 | 3
(France) J Halard (France) N Tauziat | 6 | 6

Final
1 | (Latvia) L Neiland (Spain) A Sánchez Vicario | 6 | 6
(France) J Halard (France) N Tauziat | 2 | 4
