= 1991 International Championships of Spain – Singles =

Singles
- 1991 International Championships of Spain

Final
- Champion: (Spain) Conchita Martínez
- Runner-up: (Switzerland) Manuela Maleeva-Fragnière
- Score: 6–4, 6–1

Details
- Draw: 56 (3WC)
- Seeds: 16

Events
Singles	Doubles
← 1990 ·	Spanish Open	· 1992 →

Arantxa Sánchez Vicario was the defending champion, but lost in the semifinals to Manuela Maleeva-Fragnière.

Conchita Martínez won the title by defeating Maleeva-Fragnière 6–4, 6–1 in the final.

== Seeds ==
The top eight seeds received a bye to the second round.

1. (United States) Martina Navratilova (quarterfinals)
2. (Spain) Arantxa Sánchez Vicario (semifinals)
3. (Switzerland) Manuela Maleeva-Fragnière (final)
4. (Spain) Conchita Martínez (champion)
5. (France) Nathalie Tauziat (semifinals)
6. (Austria) Judith Wiesner (quarterfinals)
7. (Germany) Isabel Cueto (third round)
8. (France) Julie Halard (quarterfinals)
9. (Italy) Katia Piccolini (third round)
10. (Germany) Wiltrud Probst (second round)
11. (Australia) Rachel McQuillan (third round)
12. (France) Karine Quentrec (third round)
13. (France) Catherine Tanvier (second round)
14. (Switzerland) Emanuela Zardo (quarterfinals)
15. (France) Alexia Dechaume (third round)
16. (Argentina) Florencia Labat (first round)

== Draw ==
=== Key ===
- Q = Qualifier
- WC = Wild card
- LL = Lucky loser
- Alt = Alternate
- ITF = ITF entry
- PR = Protected ranking
- SR = Special ranking
- SE = Special exempt
- JE = Junior exempt
- JR = Junior Accelerator Programme entrant
- CO = College Accelerator Programme entrant
- NG = Next Gen Accelerator Program entrant
- w/o = Walkover
- r = Retired
- d = Defaulted

=== Finals ===
Quarterfinals
1	(United States) Martina Navratilova	1	4
5	(France) Nathalie Tauziat	6	6
4	(Spain) Conchita Martínez	1	6	6
8	(France) Julie Halard	6	4	4
14	(Switzerland) Emanuela Zardo	3	5
3	(Switzerland) Manuela Maleeva-Fragnière	6	7
6	(Austria) Judith Wiesner	3	2
2	(Spain) Arantxa Sánchez Vicario	6	6

Semifinals
5	(France) Nathalie Tauziat	1	6	1
4	(Spain) Conchita Martínez	6	4	6
3	(Switzerland) Manuela Maleeva-Fragnière	2	7	6
2	(Spain) Arantxa Sánchez Vicario	6	5	3

Final
4	(Spain) Conchita Martínez	6	6
3	(Switzerland) Manuela Maleeva-Fragnière	4	1

=== Top half ===
==== Section 1 ====
First round
(Italy) S Farina	3	6	6
(Netherlands) C Bakkum	6	3	2
(Sweden) M Strandlund	6	6
(United States) A Gooden	3	2
(Soviet Union) V Milvidskaia	2	2
9	(Italy) K Piccolini	6	6
15	(France) A Dechaume	6	6
(Japan) A Kijimuta	1	3
(United States) B Bowes	7	3	3
(France) N Housset	5	6	6
(France) S Niox-Château	6	6
WC	(Spain) I Varas	2	3

Second round
1	(United States) M Navratilova	6	6
(Italy) S Farina	1	2
(Sweden) M Strandlund	6	6^{2}	3
9	(Italy) K Piccolini	4	7^{7}	6
15	(France) A Dechaume	6	6
(France) N Housset	1	0
(France) S Niox-Château	4	2
5	(France) N Tauziat	6	6

Third round
1	(United States) M Navratilova	6	6
9	(Italy) K Piccolini	0	2
15	(France) A Dechaume	3	3
5	(France) N Tauziat	6	6

Quarterfinals
1	(United States) M Navratilova	1	4
5	(France) N Tauziat	6	6

==== Section 2 ====
First round
(Belgium) S Wasserman	6	6
(Greece) A Kanellopoulou	3	3
WC	(Spain) N Ávila	6	6
(Germany) K Düll	0	3
(Bulgaria) E Pampoulova	1	1
11	(Australia) R McQuillan	6	6
13	(France) C Tanvier	6	4	7
(Germany) S Auer	0	6	5
(France) N van Lottum	6	6
(Spain) P Pérez	1	2
(France) I Demongeot	5	1
WC	(Spain) E Bottini	7	6

Second round
4	(Spain) C Martínez	6	6
(Belgium) S Wasserman	2	1
WC	(Spain) N Ávila	6^{13}	4
11	(Australia) R McQuillan	7^{15}	6
13	(France) C Tanvier	3	5
(France) N van Lottum	6	7
WC	(Spain) E Bottini	1	1
8	(France) J Halard	6	6

Third round
4	(Spain) C Martínez	6	6
11	(Australia) R McQuillan	4	3
(France) N van Lottum	5	0
8	(France) J Halard	7	6

Quarterfinals
4	(Spain) C Martínez	1	6	6
8	(France) J Halard	6	4	4

=== Bottom half ===
==== Section 3 ====
First round
(Brazil) C Chabalgoity	6	7^{9}
(Italy) S Lucchi	3	6^{7}
(Argentina) C Tessi	6	6
(Australia) T Morton	4	4
(Spain) M Martínez	2	1
14	(Switzerland) E Zardo	6	6
10	(West Germany) W Probst	6	6
(Brazil) A Vieira	0	4
(France) C Mothes	7	3	1
(Germany) S Frankl	5	6	6
(Netherlands) N Jagerman	6	6^{5}	7^{7}
(France) M Laval	2	7^{7}	6^{4}

Second round
7	(Germany) I Cueto	6	6
(Brazil) C Chabalgoity	3	2
(Argentina) C Tessi	4	4
14	(Switzerland) E Zardo	6	6
10	(West Germany) W Probst	4	6	3
(Germany) S Frankl	6	3	6
(Netherlands) N Jagerman	5	3
3	(Switzerland) M Maleeva-Fragnière	7	6

Third round
7	(Germany) I Cueto	6	1	2
14	(Switzerland) E Zardo	2	6	6
(Germany) S Frankl	0	1
3	(Switzerland) M Maleeva-Fragnière	6	6

Quarterfinals
14	(Switzerland) E Zardo	3	5
3	(Switzerland) M Maleeva-Fragnière	6	7

==== Section 4 ====
First round
(Germany) K Oeljeklaus	4	6	1
(France) P Etchemendy	6	3	6
(Switzerland) C Cohen	3	0
(France) N Guerrée	6	6
(Spain) A Segura	4	5
12	(France) K Quentrec	6	7
16	(Argentina) F Labat	5	6^{1}
(Argentina) B Fulco	7	7^{7}
(France) N Herreman	6	6
(United Kingdom) S Gomer	2	4
(Belgium) D Monami	5	3
(Japan) M Kidowaki	7	6

Second round
6	(Austria) J Wiesner	6	0	7
(France) P Etchemendy	4	6	5
(France) N Guerrée	2	6	4
12	(France) K Quentrec	6	4	6
(Argentina) B Fulco	6	6
(France) N Herreman	3	4
(Japan) M Kidowaki	0	0
2	(Spain) A Sánchez Vicario	6	6

Third round
6	(Austria) J Wiesner	1	6	6
12	(France) K Quentrec	6	2	0
(Argentina) B Fulco	1	2
2	(Spain) A Sánchez Vicario	6	6

Quarterfinals
6	(Austria) J Wiesner	3	2
2	(Spain) A Sánchez Vicario	6	6
