= 1994 International Championships of Spain =

- Date: 19–24 April
- Edition: 13th
- Category: Tier II
- Draw: 32S / 16D
- Prize money: $400,000
- Surface: Clay / outdoor
- Location: Barcelona, Spain
- Venue: Real Club de Polo de Barcelona

Champions

Singles
- (Spain) Arantxa Sánchez Vicario

Doubles
- (Latvia) Larisa Neiland / (Spain) Arantxa Sánchez Vicario
← 1993 ·	Spanish Open	· 1995 →

The 1994 International Championships of Spain, also known as the Spanish Open, was a women's tennis tournament played on outdoor clay courts at the Real Club de Polo de Barcelona in Barcelona, Spain that was part of the Tier II category of the 1994 WTA Tour. It was the 13th edition of the tournament and was held from 19 April until 24 April 1994. First-seeded Arantxa Sánchez Vicario won the singles title and earned $80,000 first-prize money.

== Finals ==
=== Singles ===
(Spain) Arantxa Sánchez Vicario defeated (Croatia) Iva Majoli 6–0, 6–2

- It was Sánchez Vicario's 3rd singles title of the year and the 14th of her career.

=== Doubles ===
(Latvia) Larisa Neiland / (Spain) Arantxa Sánchez Vicario defeated (France) Julie Halard / (France) Nathalie Tauziat 6–2, 6–4

- It was Sánchez Vicario's 1st doubles title of the year and the 19th of her career. It was Neiland's 3rd doubles title of the year and the 37th of her career.
