= 1991 French Open – Women's singles qualifying =

Women's singles qualifying
- 1991 French Open

Events
Singles	men	women		boys	girls
Doubles	men	women	mixed	boys	girls
WC Singles	men	women	quad
WC Doubles	men	women	quad
Legends	−45	45+	women

Qualification
Singles	men	women
- French Open

Players who neither had high enough rankings nor received wild cards to enter the main draw of the annual French Open Tennis Championships participated in a qualifying tournament held in the week before the event.

== Seeds ==
1. (Argentina) Bettina Fulco (qualified)
2. (Hungary) Anna Földényi (second round)
3. (Italy) Silvia Farina Elia (qualifying competition, lucky loser)
4. (Japan) Kimiko Date (second round)
5. (Australia) Louise Field (second round)
6. (Netherlands) Petra Kamstra (first round)
7. (Austria) Sandra Dopfer (qualifying competition, lucky loser)
8. -
9. (Brazil) Luciana Corsato-Owsianka (first round)
10. (Soviet Union) Eugenia Maniokova (first round)
11. (Japan) Mana Endo (first round)
12. (Canada) Rene Simpson (first round)
13. (Finland) Nanne Dahlman (qualified)
14. (Finland) Petra Thorén (qualified)
15. (Netherlands) Stephanie Rottier (qualified)
16. (Netherlands) Miriam Oremans (qualifying competition)

== Qualifiers ==
1. (Argentina) Bettina Fulco
2. (Netherlands) Stephanie Rottier
3. (Czechoslovakia) Leona Lásková
4. (Finland) Nanne Dahlman
5. (Italy) Nathalie Baudone
6. (United States) Beverly Bowes
7. (Australia) Michelle Jaggard-Lai
8. (Finland) Petra Thorén

== Lucky losers ==
1. (Austria) Sandra Dopfer
2. (Italy) Silvia Farina Elia

== Qualifying draw ==
Key

- Q = Qualifier
- WC = Wild card
- LL = Lucky loser
- Alt = Alternate
- ITF = ITF entry
- PR = Protected ranking
- SR = Special ranking
- SE = Special exempt
- JE = Junior exempt
- JR = Junior Accelerator Programme entrant
- CO = College Accelerator Programme entrant
- NG = Next Gen Accelerator Program entrant
- w/o = Walkover
- r = Retired
- d = Defaulted

=== First qualifier ===
First round
1	(Argentina) Bettina Fulco	6	6
(Spain) Ana Segura	3	0
(Germany) Katja Oeljeklaus	6^{9}	6	7
(Soviet Union) Agnese Gustmane	7^{11}	4	5
(Spain) Neus Ávila	3	6	4
(Australia) Jo-Anne Faull	6	1	6
(United States) Katrina Adams	6	6
12	(Canada) Rene Simpson	3	2

Second round
1	(Argentina) Bettina Fulco	6	6
(Germany) Katja Oeljeklaus	2	1
(Australia) Jo-Anne Faull	7^{7}	6
(United States) Katrina Adams	6^{1}	3

Qualifying competition
1	(Argentina) Bettina Fulco	6	6
(Australia) Jo-Anne Faull	4	3

=== Second qualifier ===
First round
15	(Netherlands) Stephanie Rottier	6	6
(United States) Camille Benjamin	1	1
(Czechoslovakia) Iva Budařová	5	1
(Greece) Julia Apostoli	7	6
WC	(France) Olivia Gravereaux	6	4	4
(Canada) Maureen Drake	3	6	6
(Poland) Katarzyna Nowak	6	6
6	(Netherlands) Petra Kamstra	3	4

Second round
15	(Netherlands) Stephanie Rottier	6	5	6
(Greece) Julia Apostoli	1	7	1
(Canada) Maureen Drake	7	1	6
(Poland) Katarzyna Nowak	5	6	0

Qualifying competition
15	(Netherlands) Stephanie Rottier	6	6
(Canada) Maureen Drake	2	3

=== Third qualifier ===
First round
3	(Italy) Silvia Farina Elia	6	6^{3}	6
(Netherlands) Hellas ter Riet	3	7^{7}	2
WC	(France) Valérie Batut	2	1
WC	(France) Angelique Olivier	6	6
(Brazil) Sabrina Giusto	4	0
(Czechoslovakia) Leona Lásková	6	6
WC	(France) Axelle Thomas	6	6
10	(Soviet Union) Eugenia Maniokova	2	0

Second round
3	(Italy) Silvia Farina Elia	4	6	8
WC	(France) Angelique Olivier	6	4	6
(Czechoslovakia) Leona Lásková	6^{3}	6	6
WC	(France) Axelle Thomas	7^{7}	3	4

Qualifying competition
3	(Italy) Silvia Farina Elia	1	6	2
(Czechoslovakia) Leona Lásková	6	4	6

=== Fourth qualifier ===
First round
13	(Finland) Nanne Dahlman	6	6
(New Zealand) Claudine Toleafoa	0	2
(Belgium) Dominique Monami	6^{1}	6	1
WC	(France) Agnès Zugasti	7^{7}	4	6
(Germany) Sabine Auer	4	0
(Czechoslovakia) Denisa Krajčovičová	6	6
(United States) Elise Burgin	7^{7}	4	4
7	(Austria) Sandra Dopfer	6^{4}	6	6

Second round
13	(Finland) Nanne Dahlman	3	6	6
WC	(France) Agnès Zugasti	6	4	2
(Czechoslovakia) Denisa Krajčovičová	6^{7}	3
7	(Austria) Sandra Dopfer	7^{9}	6

Qualifying competition
13	(Finland) Nanne Dahlman	6	4	6
7	(Austria) Sandra Dopfer	4	6	0

=== Fifth qualifier ===
First round
5	(Australia) Louise Field	6	6^{6}	6
(Australia) Rennae Stubbs	2	7^{8}	2
(Brazil) Andrea Vieira	3	1
(Italy) Nathalie Baudone	6	6
(United States) Chanda Rubin	7^{7}	7
WC	(France) Barbara Collet	6^{5}	5
WC	(France) Laurence Duffaud	2	2
16	(Netherlands) Miriam Oremans	6	6

Second round
5	(Australia) Louise Field	1	3
(Italy) Nathalie Baudone	6	6
(United States) Chanda Rubin	2	4
16	(Netherlands) Miriam Oremans	6	6

Qualifying competition
(Italy) Nathalie Baudone	6	5	6
16	(Netherlands) Miriam Oremans	4	7	3

=== Sixth qualifier ===
First round
9	(Brazil) Luciana Corsato-Owsianka	4	5
(Germany) Anouschka Popp	6	7
(Germany) Angela Kerek	6	3	4
(United States) Beverly Bowes	4	6	6
(Italy) Lorenza Jachia	6	6
(New Zealand) Hana Guy	4	4
(Soviet Union) Viktoria Milvidskaia Belinsky	4	4
4	(Japan) Kimiko Date	6	6

Second round
(Germany) Anouschka Popp	6	4	5
(United States) Beverly Bowes	4	6	7
(Italy) Lorenza Jachia	6	2	6
4	(Japan) Kimiko Date	4	6	4

Qualifying competition
(United States) Beverly Bowes	6	0	6
(Italy) Lorenza Jachia	2	6	1

=== Seventh qualifier ===
First round
Alt	(Netherlands) Caroline Vis	3	0^{r}
(Italy) Laura Lapi	6	4
(Belgium) Sandra Wasserman	6	4	3
(Australia) Michelle Jaggard-Lai	1	6	6
WC	(Argentina) Mariana Pérez Roldán	3	2
(Australia) Nicole Pratt	6	6
(United States) Jessica Emmons	6	6
11	(Japan) Mana Endo	3	2

Second round
(Italy) Laura Lapi	4	5
(Australia) Michelle Jaggard-Lai	6	7
(Australia) Nicole Pratt	1	2
(United States) Jessica Emmons	6	6

Qualifying competition
(Australia) Michelle Jaggard-Lai	6	6
(United States) Jessica Emmons	4	2

=== Eighth qualifier ===
First round
14	(Finland) Petra Thorén	7^{7}	6
(Greece) Christína Papadáki	6^{2}	3
(Brazil) Cláudia Chabalgoity	6	6
(United States) Stacey Schefflin	3	2
(United States) Caroline Kuhlman	1	6	6
(Germany) Silke Meier	6	0	4
(United States) Sandy Collins	2	3
2	(Hungary) Anna Földényi	6	6

Second round
14	(Finland) Petra Thorén	6	6
(Brazil) Cláudia Chabalgoity	3	2
(United States) Caroline Kuhlman	4	6	6
2	(Hungary) Anna Földényi	6	4	4

Qualifying competition
14	(Finland) Petra Thorén	6	6
(United States) Caroline Kuhlman	3	3
