= 1995 Ford International Championships of Spain =

- Date: 25–30 April
- Edition: 14th
- Category: Tier II
- Prize money: $430,000
- Surface: Clay / outdoor
- Location: Barcelona, Spain
- Venue: Real Club de Tenis Barcelona

Champions

Singles
- (Spain) Arantxa Sánchez Vicario

Doubles
- (Spain) Arantxa Sánchez Vicario / (Latvia) Larisa Savchenko
| ← 1994 · | Spanish Open |

The 1995 Ford International Championships of Spain was a women's tennis tournament played on outdoor clay courts at the Real Club de Tenis Barcelona in Barcelona in Spain that was part of Tier II category of the 1995 WTA Tour. It was the 14th and last edition of the tournament and was held from 25 April through 30 April 1995. First-seeded Arantxa Sánchez Vicario won the singles title.

== Finals ==
=== Singles ===
(Spain) Arantxa Sánchez Vicario defeated (Croatia) Iva Majoli 5–7, 6–0, 6–2

- It was Sánchez Vicario's 1st singles title of the year and the 21st of her career.

=== Doubles ===
(Spain) Arantxa Sánchez Vicario / (Latvia) Larisa Savchenko defeated (South Africa) Mariaan de Swardt / (Croatia) Iva Majoli 7–5, 4–6, 7–5

- It was Sánchez Vicario's 4th title of the year and the 61st of her career. It was Savchenko's 2nd title of the year and the 53rd of her career.
