= 1995 Ford International Championships of Spain – Singles =

Singles
- 1995 Ford International Championships of Spain
- 1994 Champion: (Spain) Arantxa Sánchez Vicario

Final
- Champion: (Spain) Arantxa Sánchez Vicario
- Runner-up: (Croatia) Iva Majoli
- Score: 5–7, 6–0, 6–2

Details
- Draw: 28
- Seeds: 8

Events
Singles	Doubles
← 1994 ·	Spanish Open

Arantxa Sánchez Vicario was the defending champion and won in the final 5–7, 6–0, 6–2 against Iva Majoli.

== Seeds ==
A champion seed is indicated in bold text while text in italics indicates the round in which that seed was eliminated. The top four seeds received a bye to the second round.

1. (Spain) **Arantxa Sánchez Vicario (champion)**
2. (Croatia) Iva Majoli (final)
3. (France) Julie Halard (second round)
4. (South Africa) Amanda Coetzer (semifinals)
5. (Argentina) Inés Gorrochategui (quarterfinals)
6. (France) Nathalie Tauziat (quarterfinals)
7. (United States) Ann Grossman (quarterfinals)
8. (Romania) Ruxandra Dragomir (quarterfinals)

== Draw ==
=== Key ===
- Q = Qualifier
- WC = Wild card
- LL = Lucky loser
- Alt = Alternate
- SE = Special exempt
- PR = Protected ranking
- ITF = ITF entry
- JE = Junior exempt
- w/o = Walkover
- r = Retired
- d = Defaulted
- SR = Special ranking

=== Final ===
Final
1	(Spain) **Arantxa Sánchez Vicario**	5	**6**	**6**
2	(Croatia) Iva Majoli	**7**	0	2

=== Section 1 ===
First round
LL	(Spain) **Á Montolio**	**7**	**6**
(Spain) N Ávila Bonastre	6	1
WC	(Spain) **V Ruano-Pascual**	**7**	**6**
(France) A Dechaume-Balleret	6	2
(Argentina) P Tarabini	0	3
7	(United States) **A Grossman**	**6**	**6**
Q	(Madagascar) D Randriantefy	2	**6**	0
Q	(Spain) **M Ramón Climent**	**6**	1	**6**
(Czech Republic) R Bobková	4	4
(Argentina) **B Fulco-Villella**	**6**	**6**
(South Africa) M de Swardt	4	1
6	(France) **N Tauziat**	**6**	**6**

Second round
1	(Spain) **A Sánchez Vicario**	**6**	4	**6**
LL	(Spain) Á Montolio	2	**6**	2
WC	(Spain) V Ruano-Pascual	1	2
7	(United States) **A Grossman**	**6**	**6**
4	(South Africa) **A Coetzer**	**7**	**7**
Q	(Spain) M Ramón Climent	5	5
(Argentina) B Fulco-Villella	2	3
6	(France) **N Tauziat**	**6**	**6**

Quarterfinals
1	(Spain) **A Sánchez Vicario**	**6**	**7**
7	(United States) A Grossman	3	5
4	(South Africa) **A Coetzer**	**6**	**7**
6	(France) N Tauziat	2	5

Semifinals
1	(Spain) **A Sánchez Vicario**	**6**	**6**
4	(South Africa) A Coetzer	3	3

=== Section 2 ===
First round
8	(Romania) **R Dragomir**	**6**	**6**
(Germany) S Frankl	2	1
WC	(Spain) **M Sánchez Lorenzo**	**6**	**6**
(Italy) N Baudone	2	2
(Poland) **K Nowak**	**7**	**7**
(France) S Testud	6	5
5	(Argentina) **I Gorrochategui**	**6**	**7**
(Argentina) P Suárez	2	6
(Germany) **W Probst**	**7**	**6**
Q	(Spain) R M Pérez	6	1
(Germany) **V Martinek**	**6**	**6**
Q	(Brazil) A Vieira	2	1

Second round
8	(Romania) **R Dragomir**	**6**	**7**
WC	(Spain) M Sánchez Lorenzo	1	6
(Poland) **K Nowak**	**6**	2	**6**
3	(France) J Halard	1	**6**	3
5	(Argentina) **I Gorrochategui**	5	**7**	**4**
(Germany) W Probst	**7**	5	0/r
(Germany) V Martinek	2	2
2	(Croatia) **I Majoli**	**6**	**6**

Quarterfinals
8	(Romania) R Dragomir	3	1
(Poland) **K Nowak**	**6**	**6**
5	(Argentina) I Gorrochategui	3	0
2	(Croatia) **I Majoli**	**6**	**6**

Semifinals
(Poland) K Nowak	3	1
2	(Croatia) **I Majoli**	**6**	**6**
