= 1991 International Championships of Spain =

- Date: 22–28 April
- Edition: 10th
- Category: Tier III
- Draw: 56S / 28D
- Prize money: $225,000
- Surface: Clay / outdoor
- Location: Barcelona, Spain
- Venue: Real Club de Tenis Barcelona

Champions

Singles
- (Spain) Conchita Martínez

Doubles
- (United States) Martina Navratilova / (Spain) Arantxa Sánchez Vicario
← 1990 ·	Spanish Open	· 1992 →

The 1991 International Championships of Spain, also known as the Spanish Open, was a women's tennis tournament played on outdoor clay courts at the Real Club de Tenis Barcelona in Barcelona, Spain that was part of the Tier III category of the 1991 WTA Tour. It was the tenth edition of the tournament and was held from 22 April until 28 April 1991. Fourth-seeded Conchita Martínez won the singles title and earned $45,000 first-prize money as well as 240 ranking points.

== Finals ==
=== Singles ===
(Spain) Conchita Martínez defeated (Switzerland) Manuela Maleeva-Fragnière 6–4, 6–1

- It was Martínez's 1st singles title of the year and the 8th of her career.

=== Doubles ===
(United States) Martina Navratilova / (Spain) Arantxa Sánchez Vicario defeated (France) Nathalie Tauziat / (Austria) Judith Wiesner 6–1, 6–3

- It was Navratilova's 1st doubles title of the year and the 156th of her career. It was Sánchez's 3rd and last doubles title of the year and the 8th of her career.
