= 1995 Ford International Championships of Spain – Doubles =

Doubles
- 1995 Ford International Championships of Spain
- 1994 Champions: (Spain) Arantxa Sánchez Vicario (Latvia) Larisa Savchenko

Final
- Champions: (Spain) Arantxa Sánchez Vicario (Latvia) Larisa Savchenko
- Runners-up: (South Africa) Mariaan de Swardt (Croatia) Iva Majoli
- Score: 7–5, 4–6, 7–5

Details
- Draw: 16
- Seeds: 4

Events
Singles	Doubles
← 1994 ·	Spanish Open

Arantxa Sánchez Vicario and Larisa Savchenko were the defending champions and won in the final 7–5, 4–6, 7–5 against Mariaan de Swardt and Iva Majoli.

== Seeds ==
Champion seeds are indicated in bold text while text in italics indicates the round in which those seeds were eliminated.

1. (Spain) **Arantxa Sánchez Vicario** / (Latvia) **Larisa Savchenko (champions)**
2. (France) Julie Halard / (France) Nathalie Tauziat (quarterfinals)
3. (South Africa) Amanda Coetzer / (Argentina) Inés Gorrochategui (quarterfinals)
4. (Argentina) Patricia Tarabini / (Netherlands) Caroline Vis (semifinals)

== Draw ==
=== Key ===
- Q = Qualifier
- WC = Wild card
- LL = Lucky loser
- Alt = Alternate
- SE = Special exempt
- PR = Protected ranking
- ITF = ITF entry
- JE = Junior exempt
- w/o = Walkover
- r = Retired
- d = Defaulted
- SR = Special ranking

First round
1	(Spain) **A Sánchez Vicario** (Latvia) **L Savchenko**	**7**	**6**
(Georgia (country)) N Louarsabishvili (Slovakia) P Marková	5	2
(Spain) **A Ortuño** (Spain) **S Ramón-Cortés**	**6**	**6**
(Spain) M-C Leon (Spain) J Souto	3	2
3	(South Africa) **A Coetzer** (Argentina) **I Gorrochategui**	**6**	**7**
(Czech Republic) R Bobková (Netherlands) M Koutstaal	4	5
(Romania) **R Dragomir** (United States) **A Grossman**	**6**	**6**
(United States) C Benjamin (Argentina) C Tortorella	4	0
(France) **A Dechaume-Balleret** (France) **S Testud**	**6**	**6**
(Brazil) L Tella (Brazil) A Vieira	4	2
(Argentina) B Fulco-Villella (Spain) V Ruano-Pascual	2	5
4	(Argentina) **P Tarabini** (Netherlands) **C Vis**	**6**	**7**
WC	(Spain) E Bottini (Spain) Á Montolio	4	2
(South Africa) **M de Swardt** (Croatia) **I Majoli**	**6**	**6**
Q	(Germany) S Eberlein (Argentina) V Stele	0	2
2	(France) **J Halard** (France) **N Tauziat**	**6**	**6**

Quarterfinals
1	(Spain) **A Sánchez Vicario** (Latvia) **L Savchenko**	**6**	**6**
(Spain) A Ortuño (Spain) S Ramón-Cortés	2	0
3	(South Africa) A Coetzer (Argentina) I Gorrochategui	3	3
(Romania) **R Dragomir** (United States) **A Grossman**	**6**	**6**
(France) A Dechaume-Balleret (France) S Testud	3	**6**	4
4	(Argentina) **P Tarabini** (Netherlands) **C Vis**	**6**	1	**6**
(South Africa) **M de Swardt** (Croatia) **I Majoli**	**7**	**6**
2	(France) J Halard (France) N Tauziat	5	3

Semifinals
1	(Spain) **A Sánchez Vicario** (Latvia) **L Savchenko**	**6**	**6**
(Romania) R Dragomir (United States) A Grossman	1	3
4	(Argentina) P Tarabini (Netherlands) C Vis	**6**	3	4
(South Africa) **M de Swardt** (Croatia) **I Majoli**	2	**6**	**6**

Final
1	(Spain) **Arantxa Sánchez Vicario** (Latvia) **Larisa Savchenko**	**7**	4	**7**
(South Africa) Mariaan de Swardt (Croatia) Iva Majoli	5	**6**	5
