= Lorenza Jachia =

Italian tennis player

- Country (sports): Italy
- Born: 24 October 1968 (age 56)
- Prize money: $31,424

Singles
- Highest ranking: No. 144 (5 January 1987)

Grand Slam singles results
- French Open: Q3 (1991)

Doubles
- Highest ranking: No. 170 (21 December 1986)

Lorenza Jachia (born 24 October 1968) is an Italian former professional tennis player.

Jachia reached a best singles ranking of 144 in the world, with her best WTA Tour performance a quarter-final appearance at Perugia in 1986. She made the final qualifying round of the 1991 French Open.

== ITF finals ==
$25,000 tournaments
$10,000 tournaments

=== Singles: 4 (3–1) ===
Result	No.	Date	Tournament	Surface	Opponent	Score
Win	1.	21 July 1986	Subiaco, Italy	Clay	(France) Isabelle Crudo	6–3, 6–1
Win	2.	7 August 1989	Erice, Italy	Clay	(Italy) Rosalba Caporuscio	6–3, 7–5
Win	3.	14 August 1989	Gangi, Italy	Hard	(Spain) Neus Ávila	6–2, 6–1
Loss	1.	25 June 1990	Caltagirone, Italy	Clay	(France) Sandrine Testud	6–7, 5–7

=== Doubles: 1 (1–0) ===
Result	No.	Date	Tournament	Surface	Partner	Opponents	Score
Win	1.	28 May 1990	Francavilla, Italy	Clay	(Czechoslovakia) Zuzana Witzová	(Indonesia) Irawati Iskandar (Indonesia) Tanti Trayono	6–3, 3–6, 7–5
