= 1992 Open Seat of Spain =

- Date: 20–26 April
- Edition: 11th
- Category: Tier III
- Draw: 28S / 16D
- Prize money: $225,000
- Surface: Clay / outdoor
- Location: Barcelona, Spain
- Venue: Real Club de Tenis Barcelona

Champions

Singles
- (Socialist Federal Republic of Yugoslavia) Monica Seles

Doubles
- (Spain) Conchita Martínez / (Spain) Arantxa Sánchez Vicario
| ← 1991 · | Spanish Open | · 1993 → |

The 1992 Open Seat of Spain, also known as the Spanish Open, was a women's tennis tournament played on outdoor clay courts at the Real Club de Tenis Barcelona in Barcelona, Spain that was part of the Tier III category of the 1992 WTA Tour. It was the 11th edition of the tournament and was held from 20 April until 26 April 1992. First-seeded Monica Seles won the singles title and earned $45,000 first-prize money as well as 240 ranking points.

== Finals ==
=== Singles ===
(Socialist Federal Republic of Yugoslavia) Monica Seles defeated (Spain) Arantxa Sánchez Vicario 3–6, 6–2, 6–3

- It was Seles' 5th singles title of the year and the 25th of her career.

=== Doubles ===
(Spain) Conchita Martínez / (Spain) Arantxa Sánchez Vicario defeated (France) Nathalie Tauziat / (Austria) Judith Wiesner 6–4, 6–1

- It was Martínez's only doubles title of the year and the 2nd of her career. It was Sánchez's 7th doubles title of the year and the 15th of her career.
