= 1990 International Championships of Spain =

- Date: 23–29 April
- Edition: 9th
- Category: Tier IV
- Draw: 32S / 16D
- Prize money: $150,000
- Surface: Clay / outdoor
- Location: Barcelona, Spain
- Venue: Real Club de Tenis Barcelona

Champions

Singles
- (Spain) Arantxa Sánchez

Doubles
- (Argentina) Mercedes Paz / (Spain) Arantxa Sánchez
← 1989 ·	Spanish Open	· 1991 →

The 1990 International Championships of Spain, also known as the Spanish Open, was a tennis tournament played on outdoor clay courts at the Real Club de Tenis Barcelona in Barcelona, Spain that was part of the Tier IV category of the 1990 WTA Tour. It was the ninth edition of the tournament and was held from 23 April until 29 April 1990. Second-seeded Arantxa Sánchez won the singles title and earned $27,000 first-prize money as well as 190 ranking points.

== Finals ==
=== Singles ===
(Spain) Arantxa Sánchez defeated (West Germany) Isabel Cueto 6–4, 6–2

- It was Sánchez's 1st singles title of the year and the 4th of her career.

=== Doubles ===
(Argentina) Mercedes Paz / (Spain) Arantxa Sánchez defeated (Socialist Federal Republic of Yugoslavia) Sabrina Goleš / (Argentina) Patricia Tarabini 6–7^{(7–9)}, 6–2, 6–1

- It was Paz's 3rd doubles title of the year and the 18th of her career. It was Sánchez's 4th and last doubles title of the year and the 5th of her career.
