= Bárbara Navarro =

Spanish tennis player (born 1973)

- Country (sports): Spain
- Born: 9 April 1973 (age 52)
- Prize money: $23,731

Singles
- Career record: 75–79
- Career titles: 1 ITF
- Highest ranking: No. 247 (18 May 1992)

Grand Slam singles results
- Wimbledon: Q1 (1992)

Doubles
- Career record: 26–32
- Career titles: 1 ITF
- Highest ranking: No. 261 (13 May 1991)

Grand Slam doubles results
- Wimbledon: Q1 (1992)

Bárbara Navarro (born 9 April 1973) is a Spanish former professional tennis player.

Navarro began competing on the professional tour in the early 1990s and reached a career best singles ranking of 247 in the world. During this time she qualified for two WTA Tour main draws, the 1991 Brasil Open and 1992 Spanish Open. She featured in the qualifying draw for the 1992 Wimbledon Championships.

From 1996 to 1998, Navarro played collegiate tennis for the Baylor Bears and was named Big 12 Newcomer of the Year for 1997. Following her stint in the United States she returned to the tour.

== ITF finals ==
=== Singles: 1 (1–0) ===
Outcome	No.	Date	Tournament	Surface	Opponent	Score
Winner	1.	21 July 1991	Subiaco, Italy	Clay	(Slovenia) Karin Lušnic	6–3, 3–6, 6–2

=== Doubles: 2 (1–1) ===
Outcome	No.	Date	Tournament	Surface	Partner	Opponents	Score
Runner-up	1.	25 March 1990	Granada, Spain	Hard	(Spain) Inés Canadell	(Spain) Elena Ordiñaga (Spain) Ninoska Souto	5–7, 6–4, 2–6
Winner	2.	1 October 2000	Lerida, Spain	Clay	(Spain) Patricia Aznar	(Federal Republic of Yugoslavia) Ana Timotić (Germany) Caroline-Ann Basu	6–1, 6–3
