= Iva Majoli =

Croatian tennis player (born 1977)

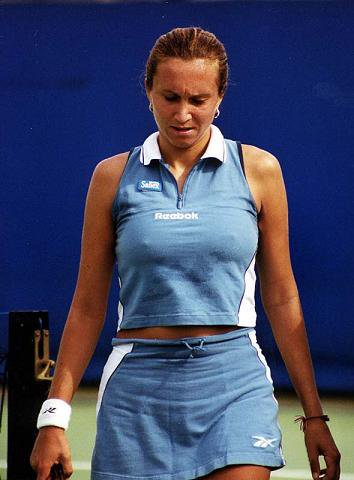
- Country (sports): Yugoslavia (1990–1992); Croatia (1992–2015)
- Residence: Zagreb, Croatia; Bradenton, Florida
- Born: 12 August 1977 (age 48) Zagreb, SR Croatia, SFR Yugoslavia
- Height: 1.75 m (5 ft 9 in)
- Turned pro: August 1991
- Retired: June 2004
- Plays: Right-handed (two-handed backhand)
- Prize money: $4,405,867

Singles
- Career record: 316–225
- Career titles: 8
- Highest ranking: No. 4 (5 February 1996)

Grand Slam singles results
- Australian Open: QF (1996)
- French Open: W (1997)
- Wimbledon: QF (1997)
- US Open: 4R (1994)

Other tournaments
- Tour Finals: SF (1996)
- Olympic Games: QF (1996)

Doubles
- Career record: 99–124
- Career titles: 1
- Highest ranking: No. 24 (21 August 1995)

Grand Slam doubles results
- Australian Open: 3R (1998)
- French Open: 3R (1997, 2002, 2003)
- Wimbledon: QF (2001)
- US Open: QF (1997)

Team competitions
- Fed Cup: QF (1999, 1996)
- Hopman Cup: W (1996)

Iva Majoli (born 12 August 1977) is a Croatian former professional tennis player who competed for both Yugoslavia and Croatia. She reached a career-high singles ranking of world No. 4, in February 1996. Majoli won eight WTA Tour-level singles titles, including three Tier I events and a major at the 1997 French Open, defeating world No. 1 Martina Hingis in the final.

== Early and personal life ==
Majoli was born in Zagreb in SR Croatia, SFR Yugoslavia to Stanko (father), and Dragica (mother). She has an older brother Drago and an older sister Nina.

== Career ==
=== Early years ===
In her early years, Iva Majoli was coached by her father Stanko, Jelena Genčić, and Nick Bollettieri, whose academy she joined in 1990. She turned professional in September the same year, when she played her first professional match in Makarska, representing Yugoslavia, losing in the first round to Ruxandra Dragomir. Majoli had her WTA main draw debut at the 1992 Virginia Slims of Houston in April. Aged 14 and ranked No. 537, she reached the quarterfinals as a wildcard entry, beating Lindsay Davenport and world No. 24 Lori McNeil, before losing to the eventual finalist Zina Garrison. Later that year she played her first Grand Slam at the 1992 US Open, reaching the 2nd round. She reached two more WTA quarterfinals that year, at the 1992 Bank of the West Classic in Oakland (beat Karina Habšudová and Lori McNeil, lost to world no.1 Monica Seles) and at the Indianapolis Tennis Classic (beat world No. 14 Nathalie Tauziat in the 2nd round). She finished her first full WTA season ranked No. 50, improving 748 spots.

=== 1993 and 1994: First WTA final, Grand Slam second week and top 20 ranking ===
Majoli reached two quarterfinals in 1993, at the 1993 Virginia Slims of Chicago in February (lost to Mary Joe Fernández in 3s) and at the Bank of the West Classic in Oakland (lost to No. 3 Martina Navratilova in 3s). At the 1993 French Open, she reached the second week of Roland Garros in her first attempt without dropping a set, beating the 15th seed Sabine Hack of Germany, and losing to Steffi Graf 4-6 6-7 in the 4th round, having led 4-2 in the first set and 6-5 in the second. After the match, the media dubbed her "the new Monica Seles". She finished the year ranked No. 46 and received the WTA Newcomer of the Year award.

In 1994 Majoli reached three WTA finals, at the Asia Women's Tennis Open Osaka (lost to Manuela Maleeva-Fragniere in 3s in the last match of Maleeva's career), at the Barcelona Ladies Open (beat Conchita Martínez and Magdalena Maleeva, lost to Arantxa Sánchez Vicario), and at the Nokia Grand Prix Essen (beat Anke Huber, lost to Jana Novotná). Other notable results include a semifinal showing at Indian Wells (lost to Graf), a semifinal at Hilton Head (beat world no.6 Gabriela Sabatini for her first career top-10 victory, lost to Conchita Martínez in 3s), and at the Acura U.S. Women's Hardcourt Championships where she beat Pam Shriver and Mary Joe Fernández, before losing to Sánchez Vicario. She also defended her 4th-round points at the French Open and reached the 4th round at the US Open. On June 20, 1994, she entered the top 20 ranking, aged 16 years and 10 months. In November, Majoli qualified for the year-end championship at the Virginia Slims of New York for the first time in her career, losing to Novotná in the first round. She finished the year at a career-high ranking of world No. 13.

=== 1995: First Tier I title, Grand Slam QF and top 10 ranking ===
Majoli started the 1995 season reaching the semifinals in Tokyo in January and Paris in February. In April, she again reached the finals of WTA Barcelona, and again lost to Sánchez Vicario. In June she reached the quarterfinals of a Grand Slam for the first time in her career, beating Mary Pierce in the 4th round at the French Open (l. to Kimiko Date in the quarterfinals). In October the same year she recorded a 10-match winning streak which included four top-10 victories and her first two WTA titles in two consecutive weeks. Majoli's first career title came at the WTA Zurich, a Tier I tournament, where she scored upsets over Jana Novotná, Chanda Rubin and Mary Pierce in the final, winning the title with a 6-4 6-4 scoreline. The following week Majoli won the WTA Filderstadt, again beating Pierce and Rubin and upsetting Gabriela Sabatini in the final 6-4 7-6. After Filderstadt, Majoli reached her new career-high ranking of world No. 9 in October 1995, at the age of 18 years and 2 months. She would stay in the top 10 for 138 consecutive weeks. At the end of the year Majoli qualified for the WTA finals for the second year in a row, again losing in the first round, this time to C. Martinez after leading 6-1 4-1.

=== 1996: Second Tier I title and top 5 ranking ===
Majoli started the 1996 by playing at the Australian open for the first time in her career. She went on to reach the quarterfinals without dropping a set, and then lost to the eventual champion Monica Seles. After the Australian Open, Majoli captured her second Tier I title in Tokyo, where she beat the reigning world No. 1 Monica Seles in the quarterfinals, the future No. 1 Martina Hingis in the semifinals, and the former No. 1 Arantxa Sánchez Vicario in the final. After Tokyo, Majoli reached her career-high ranking of world No. 4. at the age of 18 years, 5 months and 24 days. She kept this ranking for 51 weeks in total.

After Tokyo, Majoli reached the final of WTA Paris (l. to Julie Halard-Decugis 5-7 6-7) and won WTA Essen (beat Novotná in the final 7-6 in the third set). After reaching at least the final in three of the last four tournaments, Majoli lost in the quarterfinals of Hilton Head and the second round of WTA Bol in her native Croatia. She bounced back at the 1996 Rome where she reached the semifinals (l. to C. Martinez) and the semifinals of Berlin (l. to Graf). After Berlin, Majoli briefly led the Championships Race standings. At the 1996 French Open Majoli again lost to Graf in the quarterfinals. Other notable results include her fourth WTA final of the season at Leipzig (l. to Huber), semifinals at Zuerich where she was the defending champion (l. to Novotná), and the quarterfinals as the 1996 Atlanta Olympics (l. to eventual champion Davenport). She qualified for the season-ending WTA finals for the third year in a row, beating Huber and Martinez and losing to Hingis in the semifinals. Majoli finished the year at no. 8, with a 41-17 W/L ratio and almost half of those wins coming on indoor carpet surface.

=== 1997: Grand Slam title at the French Open ===
The most successful season of Iva Majoli's career started with a quarterfinal showing at Sydney and a loss to Patty Schnyder in the first round of the Australian Open. She bounced back in February, winning her first title of the season (fifth in career) at Hanover (beat Novotná in the final after saving a match point). In April, Majoli won her second title of the season at the WTA Hamburg (beat Pierce and Dragomir-Ilie). In June, she won the 1997 French Open singles title, defeating Sandra Kleinová, Alexandra Fusai, Ann Grossman, Lindsay Davenport (after trailing 5-7 0-4), Ruxandra Dragomir and Amanda Coetzer (winning the last five games in the third set, after falling behind 2-5). In the final Majoli beat the 16-year-old Martina Hingis in straight sets, 6-4, 6-2. Majoli played aggressively from the baseline to end Hingis's 37-match winning streak and prevented Hingis from winning the Grand Slam (Hingis later won Wimbledon and the US Open in 1997 making this her only defeat in a Grand Slam tournament that year). Majoli was the lowest seed (at the time) to win a Grand Slam singles title in Open Era and, at 19 years of age, the 11th teenager to win Roland Garros. Majoli followed this with her career-best showing at Wimbledon, where she beat Irina Spîrlea in the 4th round (9-7 third set) to reach the quarterfinals (l. to Anna Kournikova). She went 7-9 for the rest of the season, reaching two semifinals (in Atlanta and Chicago) and qualifying for the season-ending WTA finals for the fourth consecutive year (l. to Tauziat in the quarterfinals). Majoli finished the year at no.6, with a career best 45 matches won (23 losses), going 19-4 on clay.

=== Post 1997-career: Struggling with injuries ===
In 1998 Majoli's best results were SF in February at 1998 Toray Pan Pacific Open (l. to Hingis) and EA-Generali Ladies Linz, where she suffered a back injury and retired during match vs. Van Roost. Later in the year Majoli withdrew from Indian Wells and Miami with bronchitis. As a defending champion at Roland Garros, she came back from 3-1 down in third set to defeat world no. 6 C. Martinez in 4r to reach QF (l. to world No. 2 Davenport in 3s). At 20 years of age, this was the last top-10 victory of Majoli's career and her final showing in a second week of a Grand Slam tournament. Majoli fell out of Top 10 on May 11 and Top 20 on August 31 and withdrew from Zurich and Filderstadt with a persistent right shoulder injury which would plague her for the remainder of her tennis career.

Her best result in 1999 was a 3rd round showing at Hilton Head (d. world no 15 Spirlea in 3s). Majoli missed the Italian and German Opens, Roland Garros and Wimbledon due to the right shoulder injury and lost in the 1st round in the next five events. Having undergone the shoulder surgery after the US Open, Majoli missed the next six months of playing and returned at the 2000 Ericsson open in Miami, losing to Fabiola Zuluaga. Ranked no. 459, Majoli won her first match in over 11 months at Hilton Head, and reached her first WTA semifinal in over two years in Madrid. At WTA Kuala Lumpur as a WC (and ranked at no. 109), Majoli reached her first final since winning 1997 Roland Garros, upsetting No. 2 seed Dokic en route (l. to Nagyova). After falling as low as No. 466 on April 10, Majoli finished the season ranked No. 73 and won the 2000 WTA Comeback of the year award.

In 2001 Majoli continued her slow but steady climb up the rankings. She played all four Grand Slams for the first time since 1998, and reached another singles final at the 2001 Challenge Bell in Quebec (l. to Meghann Shaughnessy). At Paris Indoors Majoli won her first WTA doubles tournament, partnering Virginie Razzano. Other notable results include a QF showing at Tokyo Pan Pacific. At Charleston, Majoli upset No. 13 seed Dokic and stretched world No. 1 Hingis to 3s in 3r. In the 3rd round at the US Open came within two points of upsetting world No. 1 Hingis in third-set tie-break before falling 6-7 in the decider. Majoli finished the year ranked no. 32.

In 2002, ranked world No. 58, Majoli reached the final of the Family Circle Cup Tier I tournament in Charleston. She defeated Coetzer and Sandrine Testud before defeating Patty Schnyder in the final for her first win in five meetings. This was the first title for Majoli since the 1997 Roland Garros and the final title of Majoli's career. She extended her winning streak to ten matches by reaching the final of the 2002 Croatian Bol Ladies Open later that month and reached no. 22 ranking on August 26, highest since October 1998. However, her ranking started to continually decline since, and Majoli only reached one more WTA semifinal in the next two years (at 2003 Sarasota Clay Court Classic). In September 2003 Majoli dropped out of top 100 and in April 2004 out of top 200. On June 12, 2004, she announced her retirement from the game, at the age of 26. Majoli made a brief comeback in professional tennis at the 2015 Kremlin Cup, where she received a wildcard with Anastasia Bukhanko in the doubles draw.

In 2012, she was selected to be the non-playing captain of the Croatian Fed Cup team.

== Personal life ==
In 2006, Majoli announced that she was engaged and pregnant with her first child. She married a local businessman, Stipe Marić, on 9 September 2006, with Jennifer Capriati and Mary Pierce attending the wedding. She gave birth to her daughter Mia on 31 October 2006. Majoli and Marić divorced in 2012. Majoli married Roberto Calegari in 2022.

In 2007, Majoli participated in the second season of the Croatian version of Dancing with the Stars. Her partner was Marko Herceg. She was eliminated in the fourth episode.

== Significant finals ==
=== Grand Slam finals ===
==== Singles: 1 (title) ====
Result	Year	Championship	Surface	Opponent	Score
Win	1997	French Open	Clay	(Switzerland) Martina Hingis	6–4, 6–2

=== Tier I finals ===
==== Singles: 3 (3 titles) ====
Result	Year	Tournament	Surface	Opponent	Score
Win	1995	Zurich Open	Carpet (i)	(France) Mary Pierce	6–4, 6–4
Win	1996	Pan Pacific Open	Carpet (i)	(Spain) Arantxa Sánchez Vicario	6–4, 6–1
Win	2002	Charleston Open	Clay	(Switzerland) Patty Schnyder	7–6^{(7–5)}, 6–4

== WTA career finals ==
=== Singles: 17 (8 titles, 9 runner-ups) ===
Legend Grand Slam (1–0) Tier I (3–0) Tier II (4–5) Tier III, IV & V (0–4)	Finals by surface Hard (1–1) Grass (0–0) Clay (3–3) Carpet (4–5)

Result	W-L	Date	Tournament	Surface	Opponent	Score
Loss	0–1	Feb 1994	Osaka Open, Japan	Carpet (i)	(Switzerland) Manuela Maleeva-Fragniere	1–6, 6–4, 5–7
Loss	0–2	Apr 1994	Spanish Open	Clay	(Spain) Arantxa Sánchez Vicario	0–6, 2–6
Loss	0–3	Oct 1994	Essen Grand Prix, Germany	Carpet (i)	(Czech Republic) Jana Novotná	2–6, 4–6
Loss	0–4	Apr 1995	Spanish Open	Clay	(Spain) Arantxa Sánchez Vicario	7–5, 0–6, 2–6
Win	1–4	Oct 1995	Zurich Open, Switzerland	Carpet (i)	(France) Mary Pierce	6–4, 6–4
Win	2–4	Oct 1995	Filderstadt, Germany	Hard (i)	(Argentina) Gabriela Sabatini	6–4, 7–6^{(7–4)}
Win	3–4	Jan 1996	Pan Pacific Open, Japan	Carpet (i)	(Spain) Arantxa Sánchez Vicario	6–4, 6–1
Loss	3–5	Feb 1996	Paris Indoors, France	Carpet (i)	(France) Julie Halard-Decugis	5–7, 6–7^{(4–7)}
Win	4–5	Feb 1996	Essen Grand Prix, Germany	Carpet (i)	(Czech Republic) Jana Novotná	7–5, 1–6, 7–6^{(8–6)}
Loss	4–6	Sep 1996	Leipzig, Germany	Carpet (i)	(Germany) Anke Huber	7–5, 3–6, 1–6
Win	5–6	Feb 1997	Hanover, Germany	Carpet (i)	(Czech Republic) Jana Novotná	4–6, 7–6^{(7–2)}, 6–4
Win	6–6	Apr 1997	Hamburg, Germany	Clay	(Romania) Ruxandra Dragomir	6–3, 6–2
Win	7–6	May 1997	French Open	Clay	(Switzerland) Martina Hingis	6–4, 6–2
Loss	7–7	Nov 2000	Kuala Lumpur, Malaysia	Hard	(Slovakia) Henrieta Nagyová	4–6, 2–6
Loss	7–8	Sep 2001	Tournoi de Québec, Canada	Carpet (i)	(United States) Meghann Shaughnessy	1–6, 3–6
Win	8–8	Apr 2002	Charleston Open, U.S.	Clay	(Switzerland) Patty Schnyder	7–6^{(7–5)}, 6–4
Loss	8–9	Apr 2002	Bol Open, Croatia	Clay	(Sweden) Åsa Svensson	3–6, 6–4, 1–6

=== Doubles: 5 (1 title, 4 runner-ups) ===
Legend Grand Slam (0–0) Tier I (0–1) Tier II (1–2) Tier III, IV & V (0–1)	Finals by surface Hard (0–1) Grass (0–0) Clay (0–2) Carpet (1–1)

Result	W-L	Date	Tournament	Surface	Partner	Opponents	Score
Loss	0–1	Feb 1995	Linz Open, Austria	Carpet (i)	(Austria) Petra Schwarz	(United States) Meredith McGrath (France) Nathalie Tauziat	1–6, 2–6
Loss	0–2	Apr 1995	Spanish Open	Clay	(South Africa) Mariaan de Swardt	(Latvia) Larisa Neiland (Spain) Arantxa Sánchez Vicario	5–7, 6–4, 5–7
Loss	0–3	Aug 1995	Canadian Open	Hard	(Switzerland) Martina Hingis	(Argentina) Gabriela Sabatini (Netherlands) Brenda Schultz-McCarthy	6–4, 0–6, 3–6
Loss	0–4	Apr 1997	Hamburg, Germany	Clay	(Romania) Ruxandra Dragomir	(Germany) Anke Huber (France) Mary Pierce	6–4, 6–7^{(1–7)}, 2–6
Win	1–4	Feb 2001	Paris Indoor, France	Carpet (i)	(France) Virginie Razzano	(United States) Kimberly Po (France) Nathalie Tauziat	6–3, 7–5

== ITF finals ==
$75,000 tournaments
$25,000 tournaments
$10,000 tournaments

=== Singles (2–4) ===
Outcome	No.	Date	Tournament	Surface	Opponent	Score
Runner-up	1.	12 January 1992	ITF Woodlands, United States	Hard	(Italy) Elena Savoldi	4–6, 4–6
Winner	2.	21 June 1992	ITF Augusta, United States	Clay	(United States) Beverly Bowes	7–6^{(7)}, 7–6^{(5)}
Winner	3.	19 July 1992	ITF Evansville, United States	Hard	(Japan) Ai Sugiyama	6–3, 6–1
Runner-up	4.	15 October 2000	ITF Poitiers, France	Hard (i)	(Slovakia) Ľudmila Cervanová	6–4, 3–6, 2–6
Runner-up	5.	10 December 2000	ITF Cergy-Pontoise, France	Hard (i)	(France) Virginie Razzano	6–3, 4–6, 3–6
Runner-up	6.	1 February 2004	ITF Bergamo, Italy	Carpet (i)	(Czech Republic) Lucie Šafářová	6–3, 6–7^{(1)}, 1–6

=== Doubles (0–1) ===
Outcome	No.	Date	Tournament	Surface	Partner	Opponents	Score
Runner-up	1.	1 February 2004	ITF Bergamo, Italy	Carpet (i)	(Croatia) Sanda Mamić	(Italy) Alberta Brianti (France) Kildine Chevalier	4–6, 4–6

== Grand Slam singles performance timeline ==
Key
W	F	SF	QF	#R	RR	Q#	DNQ	A	NH

(W) winner; (F) finalist; (SF) semifinalist; (QF) quarterfinalist; (#R) rounds 4, 3, 2, 1; (RR) round-robin stage; (Q#) qualification round; (DNQ) did not qualify; (A) absent; (NH) not held; (SR) strike rate (events won / competed); (W–L) win–loss record.

Tournament	1992	1993	1994	1995	1996	1997	1998	1999	2000	2001	2002	2003	2004	Career SR	W–L
Australian Open	A	A	A	A	QF	1R	3R	A	A	3R	2R	1R	A	0 / 6	9–6
French Open	A	4R	4R	QF	QF	W	QF	A	2R	1R	2R	2R	A	1 / 10	28–9
Wimbledon	A	A	1R	1R	A	QF	2R	A	A	1R	3R	1R	A	0 / 7	7–7
US Open	2R	2R	4R	1R	1R	2R	2R	1R	A	3R	3R	1R	A	0 / 11	11–11
Win–loss	1–1	4–2	6–3	4–3	8–3	12–3	8–4	0–1	1–1	4–4	6–4	1–4	0–0	1 / 34	55–33
Year-end ranking	50	46	13	9	8	6	25	163	73	42	32	131	315		

Awards
Preceded by Debbie Graham	WTA Newcomer of the Year; 1993	Succeeded by Irina Spîrlea
Preceded by Sabine Appelmans	Comeback Player of the Year; 2000	Succeeded by Barbara Schwartz
