= 1993 International Championships of Spain =

- Date: 20–25 April
- Edition: 12th
- Category: Tier II
- Draw: 32S / 16D
- Prize money: $375,000
- Surface: Clay / outdoor
- Location: Barcelona, Spain
- Venue: Centre Municipal Tennis Vall d'Hebron

Champions

Singles
- (Spain) Monica Seles

Doubles
- (Spain) Conchita Martínez / (Spain) Arantxa Sánchez
← 1992 ·	Spanish Open	· 1994 →

The 1993 International Championships of Spain, also known as the Spanish Open, was a women's tennis tournament played on outdoor clay courts at the Centre Municipal Tennis Vall d'Hebron in Barcelona, Spain that was part of the Tier II category of the 1993 WTA Tour. It was the twelfth edition of the tournament and was held from 20 April until 25 April 1993. First-seeded Arantxa Sánchez Vicario won the singles title.

== Finals ==
=== Singles ===
(Spain) Arantxa Sánchez Vicario defeated (Spain) Conchita Martínez 6–1, 6–4

- It was Sánchez Vicario's 3rd singles title of the year and the 11th of her career.

=== Doubles ===
(Spain) Conchita Martínez / (Spain) Arantxa Sánchez defeated (Bulgaria) Magdalena Maleeva / (Switzerland) Manuela Maleeva-Fragnière 4–6, 6–1, 6–0

- It was Martínez's 2nd and last doubles title of the year and the 4th of her career. It was Sánchez's 1st doubles title of the year and the 19th of her career.
