= Neus Ávila =

Spanish tennis player (born 1971)

- Full name: Neus Ávila Bonastra
- Country (sports): Spain
- Born: 26 July 1971 (age 53)
- Prize money: $106,264

Singles
- Highest ranking: No. 105 (17 April 1995)

Grand Slam singles results
- French Open: 1R (1995)
- Wimbledon: 1R (1995)

Doubles
- Highest ranking: No. 304 (11 October 1993)
Medal record
Mediterranean Games
Bronze medal – third place	1991 Athens	Women's Doubles

Neus Ávila Bonastra (Note: In this Spanish name, the first or paternal surname is Ávila and the second or maternal family name is Bonastra.) (born 26 July 1971), known as Neus Ávila, is a former professional tennis player from Spain.

== Biography ==
Ávila was a bronze medalist in the women's doubles at the 1991 Mediterranean Games in Athens.

In 1993 she won ITF singles titles in Bilbao and Vigo, both $25,000 tournaments, with her ranking climbing over 100 places by the end of the year.

She competed in the main draw of several WTA Tour events in 1994, including a quarter-final appearance at the Internazionali Femminili di Palermo.

In 1995 her ranking peaked at 105 in the world, earning her direct entry into both the French Open and Wimbledon.

A member of Spain's Fed Cup winning campaign in 1995, Ávila featured in the quarter-final tie against Bulgaria. She partnered Virginia Ruano Pascual in a dead rubber doubles tie, which they lost to the Maleeva sisters, Katerina and Magdalena.

She played her final professional tournament in 1997.

== ITF finals ==
=== Singles: 7 (5-2) ===
$25,000 tournaments
$10,000 tournaments

Result	No.	Date	Tournament	Surface	Opponent	Scorenal
Loss	1.	August 14, 1989	Gangi, Italy	Hard	(Italy) Lorenza Jachia	2–6, 1–6
Win	2.	August 21, 1989	Nicolosi, Italy	Hard	(Spain) Araceli Montero	6–3, 6–2
Loss	3.	November 25, 1991	Porto Alegre, Brazil	Clay	(Argentina) María Luciana Reynares	1–6, 3–6
Win	4.	July 12, 1993	Vigo, Spain	Clay	(Spain) Ana Segura	7–6^{(7)}, 6–7^{(3)}, 7–6^{(5)}
Win	5.	July 19, 1993	Bilbao, Spain	Clay	(Brazil) Cláudia Chabalgoity	6–3, 6–0
Win	6.	June 6, 1994	Caserta, Italy	Clay	(Germany) Anca Barna	6–1, 6–2
Win	7.	February 20, 1995	Valencia, Spain	Clay	(Italy) Federica Bonsignori	6–3, 6–2

=== Doubles: 1 (0–1) ===
Result	No.	Date	Tournament	Surface	Partner	Opponents	Score
Loss	1.	August 14, 1989	Gangi, Italy	Hard	(Spain) Virginia Ruano Pascual	(Italy) Doris Iotti (Venezuela) Nelly Pardo	6–4, 3–6, 2–6
