= 2014 WTA Premier tournaments =

Tennis tournaments

The 2014 WTA Premier tournaments are 21 of the tennis tournaments on the 2014 WTA Tour. The WTA Tour is the elite tour for women's professional tennis. The WTA Premier tournaments rank below the Grand Slam events and above the WTA International tournaments. They are divided into three levels: Premier Mandatory (Indian Wells, Miami, Madrid and Beijing), Premier 5 (Doha, Rome, Canada, Cincinnati and Wuhan), and Premier (12 tournaments in Europe, United States and Australia).

== Schedule ==
=== Premier ===
Week of	Tournament	Champions	Runners-up	Semifinalists	Quarterfinalists
30 December	Brisbane International; Brisbane, Australia	(United States) Serena Williams; 6–4, 7–5	(Belarus) Victoria Azarenka	(Russia) Maria Sharapova (Serbia) Jelena Janković	(Slovakia) Dominika Cibulková (Estonia) Kaia Kanepi (Germany) Angelique Kerber (Switzerland) Stefanie Vögele
30 December	Brisbane International; Brisbane, Australia	(Russia) Alla Kudryavtseva (Australia) Anastasia Rodionova; 6–3, 6–1	(France) Kristina Mladenovic (Kazakhstan) Galina Voskoboeva	(Russia) Maria Sharapova (Serbia) Jelena Janković	(Slovakia) Dominika Cibulková (Estonia) Kaia Kanepi (Germany) Angelique Kerber (Switzerland) Stefanie Vögele
6 January	Apia International Sydney; Sydney, Australia	(Bulgaria) Tsvetana Pironkova; 6–4, 6–4	(Germany) Angelique Kerber	(United States) Madison Keys (Czech Republic) Petra Kvitová	(United States) Bethanie Mattek-Sands (Spain) Carla Suárez Navarro (Italy) Sara Errani (Czech Republic) Lucie Šafářová
6 January	Apia International Sydney; Sydney, Australia	(Hungary) Tímea Babos (Czech Republic) Lucie Šafářová; 7–5, 3–6, [10–7]	(Italy) Sara Errani (Italy) Roberta Vinci	(United States) Madison Keys (Czech Republic) Petra Kvitová	(United States) Bethanie Mattek-Sands (Spain) Carla Suárez Navarro (Italy) Sara Errani (Czech Republic) Lucie Šafářová
27 January	Open GDF Suez; Paris, France	(Russia) Anastasia Pavlyuchenkova; 3–6, 6–2, 6–3	(Italy) Sara Errani	(Russia) Maria Sharapova (France) Alizé Cornet	(Belgium) Kirsten Flipkens (Germany) Angelique Kerber (Ukraine) Elina Svitolina (Germany) Andrea Petkovic
27 January	Open GDF Suez; Paris, France	(Germany) Anna-Lena Grönefeld (Czech Republic) Květa Peschke; 6–7^{7–9)}, 6–4, [10–5]	(Hungary) Tímea Babos (France) Kristina Mladenovic	(Russia) Maria Sharapova (France) Alizé Cornet	(Belgium) Kirsten Flipkens (Germany) Angelique Kerber (Ukraine) Elina Svitolina (Germany) Andrea Petkovic
17 February	Barclays Dubai Tennis; Championships; Dubai, UAE	(United States) Venus Williams; 6–3, 6–0	(France) Alizé Cornet	(United States) Serena Williams (Denmark) Caroline Wozniacki	(Serbia) Jelena Janković (Spain) Carla Suárez Navarro (Romania) Sorana Cîrstea (Italy) Flavia Pennetta
17 February	Barclays Dubai Tennis; Championships; Dubai, UAE	(Russia) Alla Kudryavtseva (Australia) Anastasia Rodionova; 6–2, 5–7, [10–8]	(United States) Raquel Kops-Jones (United States) Abigail Spears	(United States) Serena Williams (Denmark) Caroline Wozniacki	(Serbia) Jelena Janković (Spain) Carla Suárez Navarro (Romania) Sorana Cîrstea (Italy) Flavia Pennetta
31 March	Family Circle Cup; Charleston, USA	(Germany) Andrea Petkovic; 7–5, 6–2	(Slovakia) Jana Čepelová	(Switzerland) Belinda Bencic (Canada) Eugenie Bouchard	(Slovakia) Daniela Hantuchová (Italy) Sara Errani (Czech Republic) Lucie Šafářová (Serbia) Jelena Janković
31 March	Family Circle Cup; Charleston, USA	(Spain) Anabel Medina Garrigues (Kazakhstan) Yaroslava Shvedova; 7–6^{(7–4)}, 6–2	(Chinese Taipei) Chan Hao-ching (Chinese Taipei) Chan Yung-jan	(Switzerland) Belinda Bencic (Canada) Eugenie Bouchard	(Slovakia) Daniela Hantuchová (Italy) Sara Errani (Czech Republic) Lucie Šafářová (Serbia) Jelena Janković
21 April	Porsche Tennis Grand Prix; Stuttgart, Germany	(Russia) Maria Sharapova; 3–6, 6–4, 6–1	(Serbia) Ana Ivanovic	(Italy) Sara Errani (Serbia) Jelena Janković	(Poland) Agnieszka Radwańska (Spain) Carla Suárez Navarro (Russia) Alisa Kleybanova (Russia) Svetlana Kuznetsova
21 April	Porsche Tennis Grand Prix; Stuttgart, Germany	(Italy) Sara Errani (Italy) Roberta Vinci; 6–2, 6–3	(Zimbabwe) Cara Black (India) Sania Mirza	(Italy) Sara Errani (Serbia) Jelena Janković	(Poland) Agnieszka Radwańska (Spain) Carla Suárez Navarro (Russia) Alisa Kleybanova (Russia) Svetlana Kuznetsova
9 June	Aegon Classic; Birmingham, UK	(Serbia) Ana Ivanovic; 6–3, 6–2	(Czech Republic) Barbora Záhlavová-Strýcová	(China) Zhang Shuai (Australia) Casey Dellacqua	(Czech Republic) Klára Koukalová (United States) Sloane Stephens (Belgium) Kirsten Flipkens (Japan) Kimiko Date-Krumm
9 June	Aegon Classic; Birmingham, UK	(United States) Raquel Kops-Jones (United States) Abigail Spears; 7–6^{(7–1)}, 6–1	(Australia) Ashleigh Barty (Australia) Casey Dellacqua	(China) Zhang Shuai (Australia) Casey Dellacqua	(Czech Republic) Klára Koukalová (United States) Sloane Stephens (Belgium) Kirsten Flipkens (Japan) Kimiko Date-Krumm
16 June	Aegon International; Eastbourne, UK	(United States) Madison Keys; 6–3, 3–6, 7–5	(Germany) Angelique Kerber	(Denmark) Caroline Wozniacki (United Kingdom) Heather Watson	(Russia) Ekaterina Makarova (Italy) Camila Giorgi (United States) Lauren Davis (Czech Republic) Petra Kvitová
16 June	Aegon International; Eastbourne, UK	(Chinese Taipei) Chan Hao-ching (Chinese Taipei) Chan Yung-jan; 6–3, 5–7, [10–7]	(Switzerland) Martina Hingis (Italy) Flavia Pennetta	(Denmark) Caroline Wozniacki (United Kingdom) Heather Watson	(Russia) Ekaterina Makarova (Italy) Camila Giorgi (United States) Lauren Davis (Czech Republic) Petra Kvitová
28 July	Bank of the West Classic; Stanford, USA	(United States) Serena Williams; 7–6^{(7–1)}, 6–3	(Germany) Angelique Kerber	(Germany) Andrea Petkovic (United States) Varvara Lepchenko	(Serbia) Ana Ivanovic (United States) Venus Williams (Spain) Garbiñe Muguruza (United States) Sachia Vickery
28 July	Bank of the West Classic; Stanford, USA	(Spain) Garbiñe Muguruza (Spain) Carla Suárez Navarro; 6–2, 4–6, [10–5]	(Poland) Paula Kania (Czech Republic) Kateřina Siniaková	(Germany) Andrea Petkovic (United States) Varvara Lepchenko	(Serbia) Ana Ivanovic (United States) Venus Williams (Spain) Garbiñe Muguruza (United States) Sachia Vickery
18 August	New Haven Open at Yale; New Haven, USA	(Czech Republic) Petra Kvitová; 6–4, 6–2	(Slovakia) Magdaléna Rybáriková	(Italy) Camila Giorgi (Australia) Samantha Stosur	(United States) Alison Riske (Spain) Garbiñe Muguruza (Belgium) Kirsten Flipkens (Czech Republic) Barbora Záhlavová Strýcová
18 August	New Haven Open at Yale; New Haven, USA	(Slovenia) Andreja Klepač (Spain) Sílvia Soler-Espinosa; 7–5, 4–6, [10–7]	(New Zealand) Marina Erakovic (Spain) Arantxa Parra Santonja	(Italy) Camila Giorgi (Australia) Samantha Stosur	(United States) Alison Riske (Spain) Garbiñe Muguruza (Belgium) Kirsten Flipkens (Czech Republic) Barbora Záhlavová Strýcová
15 September	Toray Pan Pacific Open; Tokyo, Japan	(Serbia) Ana Ivanovic; 6–2, 7–6^{(7–2)}	(Denmark) Caroline Wozniacki	(Germany) Angelique Kerber (Spain) Garbiñe Muguruza	(Slovakia) Dominika Cibulková (Czech Republic) Lucie Šafářová (Australia) Casey Dellacqua (Spain) Carla Suárez Navarro
15 September	Toray Pan Pacific Open; Tokyo, Japan	(Zimbabwe) Cara Black (India) Sania Mirza; 6–2, 7–5	(Spain) Garbiñe Muguruza (Spain) Carla Suárez Navarro	(Germany) Angelique Kerber (Spain) Garbiñe Muguruza	(Slovakia) Dominika Cibulková (Czech Republic) Lucie Šafářová (Australia) Casey Dellacqua (Spain) Carla Suárez Navarro
13 October	Kremlin Cup; Moscow, Russia	(Russia) Anastasia Pavlyuchenkova; 6–4, 5–7, 6–1	(Romania) Irina-Camelia Begu	(Czech Republic) Kateřina Siniaková (Czech Republic) Lucie Šafářová	(Russia) Vitalia Diatchenko (Italy) Camila Giorgi (Russia) Svetlana Kuznetsova (Bulgaria) Tsvetana Pironkova
13 October	Kremlin Cup; Moscow, Russia	(Switzerland) Martina Hingis (Italy) Flavia Pennetta; 6–3, 7–5	(France) Caroline Garcia (Spain) Arantxa Parra Santonja	(Czech Republic) Kateřina Siniaková (Czech Republic) Lucie Šafářová	(Russia) Vitalia Diatchenko (Italy) Camila Giorgi (Russia) Svetlana Kuznetsova (Bulgaria) Tsvetana Pironkova
