= 2013 Aegon Classic – Singles =

Singles
- 2013 Aegon Classic

Final
- Champion: (Slovakia) Daniela Hantuchová
- Runner-up: (Croatia) Donna Vekić
- Score: 7–6^{(7–5)}, 6–4

Details
- Draw: 56 (8 Q / 4 WC )
- Seeds: 16

Events
Singles	Doubles
← 2012 ·	Birmingham Classic	· 2014 →

Melanie Oudin was the defending champion, but lost in the first round to Ajla Tomljanović.

Daniela Hantuchová won the title, defeating Donna Vekić 7–6^{(7–5)}, 6–4 in the final.

== Seeds ==
The top eight seeds receive a bye into the second round.

1. (Belgium) Kirsten Flipkens (third round)
2. (Russia) Ekaterina Makarova (second round)
3. (Romania) Sorana Cîrstea (quarterfinals)
4. (Austria) Tamira Paszek (second round)
5. (Germany) Sabine Lisicki (quarterfinals)
6. (Germany) Mona Barthel (third round)
7. (United Kingdom) Laura Robson (second round)
8. (Poland) Urszula Radwańska (second round)
9. (Belgium) Yanina Wickmayer (second round)
10. (Chinese Taipei) Hsieh Su-wei (first round)
11. (Japan) Ayumi Morita (first round)
12. (France) Kristina Mladenovic (third round)
13. (Serbia) Bojana Jovanovski (third round)
14. (United Kingdom) Heather Watson (second round)
15. (Italy) Francesca Schiavone (quarterfinals)
16. (Slovakia) Magdaléna Rybáriková (semifinals)

== Draw ==
=== Key ===
- Q = Qualifier
- WC = Wild card
- LL = Lucky loser
- Alt = Alternate
- ITF = ITF entry
- PR = Protected ranking
- SR = Special ranking
- SE = Special exempt
- JE = Junior exempt
- JR = Junior Accelerator Programme entrant
- CO = College Accelerator Programme entrant
- NG = Next Gen Accelerator Program entrant
- w/o = Walkover
- r = Retired
- d = Defaulted

=== Finals ===
Quarterfinals
16	(Slovakia) Magdaléna Rybáriková	6	6
(United States) Madison Keys	3	0
3	(Romania) Sorana Cîrstea	2	1
(Croatia) Donna Vekić	6	6
5	(Germany) Sabine Lisicki	6^{2}	6	4
Q	(United States) Alison Riske	7^{7}	2	6
(Slovakia) Daniela Hantuchová	6^{8}	6	7^{7}
15	(Italy) Francesca Schiavone	7^{10}	4	6^{3}

Semifinals
16	(Slovakia) Magdaléna Rybáriková	6^{5}	6	3
(Croatia) Donna Vekić	7^{7}	1	6
Q	(United States) Alison Riske	7	1	4
(Slovakia) Daniela Hantuchová	5	6	6

Final
(Croatia) Donna Vekić	6^{5}	4
(Slovakia) Daniela Hantuchová	7^{7}	6

=== Top half ===
==== Section 1 ====
First round
(United States) M Oudin	3	1
Q	(Croatia) A Tomljanović	6	6
(Czech Republic) P Cetkovská	5	2
(France) M Johansson	7	6
WC	(United Kingdom) M South	4	2
16	(Slovakia) M Rybáriková	6	6
10	(Chinese Taipei) S-w Hsieh	2	3
(United States) J Hampton	6	6
(United States) M Keys	3	6	7^{7}
(Ukraine) L Tsurenko	6	3	6^{3}
(Serbia) V Dolonc	6^{8}	6	6
(Portugal) MJ Koehler	7^{10}	0	3

Second round
1	(Belgium) K Flipkens	4	6	7
Q	(Croatia) A Tomljanović	6	4	5
(France) M Johansson	5	7^{7}	4
16	(Slovakia) M Rybáriková	7	6^{4}	6
(United States) J Hampton	6	3	6^{3}
(United States) M Keys	2	6	7^{7}
(Serbia) V Dolonc	5	6	5
6	(Germany) M Barthel	7	2	7

Third round
1	(Belgium) K Flipkens	6^{5}	2
16	(Slovakia) M Rybáriková	7^{7}	6
(United States) M Keys	6	6
6	(Germany) M Barthel	3	2

Quarterfinals
16	(Slovakia) M Rybáriková	6	6
(United States) M Keys	3	0

==== Section 2 ====
First round
(Bulgaria) T Pironkova	6	6
(United States) L Davis	2	1
(Czech Republic) A Hlaváčková	6	6
(Russia) O Puchkova	2	4
(Canada) E Bouchard	7	3	2
13	(Serbia) B Jovanovski	5	6	6
11	(Japan) A Morita	4	0
Q	(Belgium) A Van Uytvanck	6	6
Q	(United States) M Sanchez	6	6
(Slovakia) J Čepelová	3	2
(Italy) C Giorgi	6^{2}	3
(Croatia) D Vekić	7^{7}	6

Second round
3	(Romania) S Cîrstea	6	6
(Bulgaria) T Pironkova	4	4
(Czech Republic) A Hlaváčková	6	1	4
13	(Serbia) B Jovanovski	4	6	6
Q	(Belgium) A Van Uytvanck	6^{3}	3
Q	(United States) M Sanchez	7^{7}	6
(Croatia) D Vekić	6	6
8	(Poland) U Radwańska	3	2

Third round
3	(Romania) S Cîrstea	6	1	6
13	(Serbia) B Jovanovski	1	6	1
Q	(United States) M Sanchez	6	2	2
(Croatia) D Vekić	4	6	6

Quarterfinals
3	(Romania) S Cîrstea	2	1
(Croatia) D Vekić	6	6

=== Bottom half ===
==== Section 3 ====
First round
(United States) C Vandeweghe	7^{7}	6^{5}	5
(Czech Republic) Kr Plíšková	6^{5}	7^{7}	7
(Croatia) M Lučić-Baroni	6	6
(Czech Republic) Ka Plíšková	3	2
(Kazakhstan) Y Putintseva	2	6^{5}
9	(Belgium) Y Wickmayer	6	7^{7}
14	(United Kingdom) H Watson	6	7^{7}
(Hungary) M Czink	4	6^{0}
Q	(Russia) A Kudryavtseva	6	7^{7}
(Japan) K Date-Krumm	4	6^{3}
WC	(United Kingdom) A Keothavong	5	2
Q	(United States) A Riske	7	6

Second round
5	(Germany) S Lisicki	6	6
(Czech Republic) Kr Plíšková	4	2
(Croatia) M Lučić-Baroni	6	6
9	(Belgium) Y Wickmayer	4	0
14	(United Kingdom) H Watson	4	3
Q	(Russia) A Kudryavtseva	6	6
Q	(United States) A Riske	2	6	6
4	(Austria) T Paszek	6	2	3

Third round
5	(Germany) S Lisicki	7	2	6
(Croatia) M Lučić-Baroni	5	6	4
Q	(Russia) A Kudryavtseva	1	2
Q	(United States) A Riske	6	6

Quarterfinals
5	(Germany) S Lisicki	6^{2}	6	4
Q	(United States) A Riske	7^{7}	2	6

==== Section 4 ====
First round
Q	(Australia) C Dellacqua	1	6^{1}
(Slovakia) D Hantuchová	6	7^{7}
Q	(Japan) K Nara	2	4
WC	(United Kingdom) J Konta	6	6
WC	(United Kingdom) T Moore	7	6^{5}	4
12	(France) K Mladenovic	5	7^{7}	6
15	(Italy) F Schiavone	2	6	7^{7}
(Georgia (country)) A Tatishvili	6	3	6^{3}
Q	(Ukraine) N Kichenok	6	6
(Hungary) T Babos	3	4
(Ukraine) E Svitolina	0	1
(New Zealand) M Erakovic	6	6

Second round
7	(United Kingdom) L Robson	3	4
(Slovakia) D Hantuchová	6	6
WC	(United Kingdom) J Konta	4	1
12	(France) K Mladenovic	6	6
15	(Italy) F Schiavone	7^{7}	6
Q	(Ukraine) N Kichenok	6^{4}	2
(New Zealand) M Erakovic	7^{8}	3	6
2	(Russia) E Makarova	6^{6}	6	0

Third round
(Slovakia) D Hantuchová	3	7^{8}	6
12	(France) K Mladenovic	6	6^{6}	4
15	(Italy) F Schiavone	7^{7}	6
(New Zealand) M Erakovic	6^{3}	3

Quarterfinals
(Slovakia) D Hantuchová	6^{8}	6	7^{7}
15	(Italy) F Schiavone	7^{10}	4	6^{3}

== Qualifying ==
=== Seeds ===
1. (France) Caroline Garcia (qualifying competition)
2. (United States) Maria Sanchez (qualified)
3. (Canada) Sharon Fichman (qualifying competition)
4. (Greece) Eleni Daniilidou (first round, retired)
5. (Thailand) Luksika Kumkhum (first round)
6. (Portugal) Michelle Larcher de Brito (first round)
7. (Australia) Anastasia Rodionova (qualifying competition)
8. (United States) Irina Falconi (first round)
9. (Croatia) Ajla Tomljanović (qualified)
10. (Japan) Kurumi Nara (qualified)
11. (Australia) Casey Dellacqua (qualified)
12. (Russia) Ekaterina Bychkova (qualifying competition)
13. (Australia) Olivia Rogowska (first round)
14. (Colombia) Catalina Castaño (qualifying competition)
15. (Thailand) Tamarine Tanasugarn (first round)
16. (Ukraine) Nadiia Kichenok (qualified)

=== Qualifiers ===
1. (Australia) Casey Dellacqua
2. (United States) Maria Sanchez
3. (Ukraine) Nadiia Kichenok
4. (Japan) Kurumi Nara
5. (Belgium) Alison Van Uytvanck
6. (Russia) Alla Kudryavtseva
7. (Croatia) Ajla Tomljanović
8. (United States) Alison Riske

=== Qualifying draw ===
==== First qualifier ====
First round
1	(France) Caroline Garcia	6	6
WC	(United Kingdom) Danielka Borthwick	2	1
(Russia) Vera Dushevina	4	3
11	(Australia) Casey Dellacqua	6	6

Qualifying competition
1	(France) Caroline Garcia	6^{7}	4
11	(Australia) Casey Dellacqua	7^{9}	6

==== Second qualifier ====
First round
2	(United States) Maria Sanchez	6	6
(United States) Taylor Townsend	3	3
WC	(United Kingdom) Jessica Ren	2	1
14	(Colombia) Catalina Castaño	6	6

Qualifying competition
2	(United States) Maria Sanchez	6	6
14	(Colombia) Catalina Castaño	0	4

==== Third qualifier ====
First round
3	(Canada) Sharon Fichman	6	6
WC	(United Kingdom) Eden Silva	0	2
(Australia) Ashleigh Barty	4	6^{4}
16	(Ukraine) Nadiia Kichenok	6	7^{7}

Qualifying competition
3	(Canada) Sharon Fichman	2	3
16	(Ukraine) Nadiia Kichenok	6	6

==== Fourth qualifier ====
First round
4	(Greece) Eleni Daniilidou	0	1^{r}
(United States) Shelby Rogers	6	4
(Australia) Sacha Jones	4	1
10	(Japan) Kurumi Nara	6	6

Qualifying competition
(United States) Shelby Rogers	6	3	5
10	(Japan) Kurumi Nara	2	6	7

==== Fifth qualifier ====
First round
5	(Thailand) Luksika Kumkhum	6	6^{6}	0
(Belgium) Alison Van Uytvanck	2	7^{8}	6
(United States) Jennifer Elie	4	4
12	(Russia) Ekaterina Bychkova	6	6

Qualifying competition
(Belgium) Alison Van Uytvanck	6	7
12	(Russia) Ekaterina Bychkova	1	5

==== Sixth qualifier ====
First round
6	(Portugal) Michelle Larcher de Brito	6	4	4
(Spain) Arantxa Parra Santonja	4	6	6
(Russia) Alla Kudryavtseva	4	7	6
15	(Thailand) Tamarine Tanasugarn	6	5	3

Qualifying competition
(Spain) Arantxa Parra Santonja	2	4
(Russia) Alla Kudryavtseva	6	6

==== Seventh qualifier ====
First round
7	(Australia) Anastasia Rodionova	6	6
WC	(United Kingdom) Sabrina Bamburac	1	1
(France) Virginie Razzano	4	4
9	(Croatia) Ajla Tomljanović	6	6

Qualifying competition
7	(Australia) Anastasia Rodionova	2	3
9	(Croatia) Ajla Tomljanović	6	6

==== Eighth qualifier ====
First round
8	(United States) Irina Falconi	2	2
(United States) Alison Riske	6	6
(Canada) Gabriela Dabrowski	6	7^{7}
13	(Australia) Olivia Rogowska	3	6^{4}

Qualifying competition
(United States) Alison Riske	6	6
(Canada) Gabriela Dabrowski	2	1
