= 2014 Aegon Classic – Singles =

Singles
- 2014 Aegon Classic

Final
- Champion: (Serbia) Ana Ivanovic
- Runner-up: (Czech Republic) Barbora Záhlavová-Strýcová
- Score: 6–3, 6–2

Details
- Draw: 56 (8 Q / 3 WC )
- Seeds: 16

Events
Singles	Doubles
← 2013 ·	Birmingham Classic	· 2015 →

Daniela Hantuchová was the defending champion, but lost in the third round to Kimiko Date-Krumm.

Ana Ivanovic won the title, defeating Barbora Záhlavová-Strýcová in the final, 6–3, 6–2. This was the only title Ivanovic won on grass throughout her career.

== Seeds ==
The top eight seeds receive a bye into the second round.

1. (Serbia) Ana Ivanovic (champion)
2. (Australia) Samantha Stosur (third round)
3. (United States) Sloane Stephens (quarterfinals)
4. (Belgium) Kirsten Flipkens (quarterfinals)
5. (Czech Republic) Lucie Šafářová (second round)
6. (Czech Republic) Klára Koukalová (quarterfinals)
7. (Slovakia) Daniela Hantuchová (third round)
8. (Slovakia) Magdaléna Rybáriková (second round)
9. (China) Zhang Shuai (semifinals)
10. (Serbia) Bojana Jovanovski (first round)
11. (United States) Madison Keys (second round)
12. (Puerto Rico) Monica Puig (second round)
13. (France) Caroline Garcia (first round)
14. (Japan) Kurumi Nara (first round)
15. (United States) Alison Riske (third round)
16. (Australia) Casey Dellacqua (semifinals)

Click on the seed number of a player to go to their draw section.

== Draw ==
=== Key ===
- Q = Qualifier
- WC = Wild card
- LL = Lucky loser
- Alt = Alternate
- ITF = ITF entry
- PR = Protected ranking
- SR = Special ranking
- SE = Special exempt
- JE = Junior exempt
- JR = Junior Accelerator Programme entrant
- CO = College Accelerator Programme entrant
- NG = Next Gen Accelerator Program entrant
- w/o = Walkover
- r = Retired
- d = Defaulted

=== Finals ===
Quarterfinals
1	(Serbia) Ana Ivanovic	6	6
6	(Czech Republic) Klára Koukalová	1	4
3	(United States) Sloane Stephens	3	1
9	(China) Zhang Shuai	6	6
(Czech Republic) Barbora Záhlavová-Strýcová	6	6
4	(Belgium) Kirsten Flipkens	4	2
(Japan) Kimiko Date-Krumm	1	0
16	(Australia) Casey Dellacqua	6	6

Semifinals
1	(Serbia) Ana Ivanovic	6	6
9	(China) Zhang Shuai	2	2
(Czech Republic) Barbora Záhlavová-Strýcová	7^{7}	6
16	(Australia) Casey Dellacqua	6^{5}	1

Final
1	(Serbia) Ana Ivanovic	6	6
(Czech Republic) Barbora Záhlavová-Strýcová	3	2

=== Top half ===
==== Section 1 ====
First round
(Germany) M Barthel	6	6
(Croatia) A Tomljanović	1	4
Q	(Austria) T Paszek	3	6	2
(United States) L Davis	6	3	6
Q	(United States) V Duval	6	6
13	(France) C Garcia	2	4
10	(Serbia) B Jovanovski	4	4
(Belgium) Y Wickmayer	6	6
(United States) C Vandeweghe	6	7
(Kazakhstan) Z Diyas	4	5
(France) V Razzano	7^{7}	6
(Czech Republic) Ka Plíšková	6^{1}	3

Second round
1	(Serbia) A Ivanovic	6	6
(Germany) M Barthel	4	1
(United States) L Davis	6	2	6
Q	(United States) V Duval	2	6	2
(Belgium) Y Wickmayer	7	5	1
(United States) C Vandeweghe	5	7	6
(France) V Razzano	7	6^{5}	6^{0}
6	(Czech Republic) K Koukalová	5	7^{7}	7^{7}

Third round
1	(Serbia) A Ivanovic	6	6
(United States) L Davis	1	1
(United States) C Vandeweghe	6	6^{3}	4
6	(Czech Republic) K Koukalová	3	7^{7}	6

Quarterfinals
1	(Serbia) A Ivanovic	6	6
6	(Czech Republic) K Koukalová	1	4

==== Section 2 ====
First round
(China) J Zheng	3	4
(Italy) F Schiavone	6	6
(Canada) S Fichman	7^{8}	6^{2}	3
Q	(Ukraine) N Kichenok	6^{6}	7^{7}	6
Q	(Ukraine) L Kichenok	6^{3}	3
15	(United States) A Riske	7^{7}	6
9	(China) S Zhang	7	6
Q	(Greece) E Daniilidou	5	4
(France) K Mladenovic	6	2	2
(Israel) S Pe'er	4	6	6
(Czech Republic) P Cetkovská	6	6
(Romania) A Cadanțu	3	4

Second round
3	(United States) S Stephens	6	6
(Italy) F Schiavone	2	4
Q	(Ukraine) N Kichenok	6^{4}	1
15	(United States) A Riske	7^{7}	6
9	(China) S Zhang	6	3	6
(Israel) S Pe'er	3	6	2
(Czech Republic) P Cetkovská	6	7
8	(Slovakia) M Rybáriková	4	5

Third round
3	(United States) S Stephens	7^{7}	2	6
15	(United States) A Riske	6^{4}	6	1
9	(China) S Zhang	6	7^{8}
(Czech Republic) P Cetkovská	0	6^{6}

Quarterfinals
3	(United States) S Stephens	3	1
9	(China) S Zhang	6	6

=== Bottom half ===
==== Section 3 ====
First round
(Czech Republic) B Záhlavová-Strýcová	5	6	6
WC	(United Kingdom) N Broady	7	4	3
LL	(Hungary) T Babos	6	6
(New Zealand) M Erakovic	3	4
(Brazil) T Pereira	3	3
11	(United States) M Keys	6	6
14	(Japan) K Nara	3	1
WC	(United Kingdom) J Konta	6	6
WC	(United Kingdom) H Watson	6	5	4
Q	(Canada) A Wozniak	2	7	6
(Italy) C Giorgi	4	6	2
Q	(United Kingdom) K Dunne	6	1	1^{r}

Second round
5	(Czech Republic) L Šafářová	3	6	5
(Czech Republic) B Záhlavová-Strýcová	6	3	7
LL	(Hungary) T Babos	6	6
11	(United States) M Keys	2	1
WC	(United Kingdom) J Konta	4	2
Q	(Canada) A Wozniak	6	6
(Italy) C Giorgi	3	2
4	(Belgium) K Flipkens	6	6

Third round
(Czech Republic) B Záhlavová-Strýcová	6	0	6
LL	(Hungary) T Babos	2	6	3
Q	(Canada) A Wozniak	6	5	4
4	(Belgium) K Flipkens	1	7	6

Quarterfinals
(Czech Republic) B Záhlavová-Strýcová	6	6
4	(Belgium) K Flipkens	4	2

==== Section 4 ====
First round
(Croatia) D Vekić	4	4
(Switzerland) B Bencic	6	6
(Argentina) P Ormaechea	3	1
(Japan) K Date-Krumm	6	6
(Switzerland) S Vögele	7^{7}	2	2
12	(Puerto Rico) M Puig	6^{3}	6	6
16	(Australia) C Dellacqua	6	6
(Poland) U Radwańska	1	3
(Belgium) A Van Uytvanck	4	0
(United States) V Lepchenko	6	6
(Slovakia) A Schmiedlová	6^{5}	4
(United States) C McHale	7^{7}	6

Second round
7	(Slovakia) D Hantuchová	6	6
(Switzerland) B Bencic	1	4
(Japan) K Date-Krumm	2	6	7^{9}
12	(Puerto Rico) M Puig	6	4	6^{7}
16	(Australia) C Dellacqua	6	6
(United States) V Lepchenko	4	3
(United States) C McHale	1	3
2	(Australia) S Stosur	6	6

Third round
7	(Slovakia) D Hantuchová	4	0
(Japan) K Date-Krumm	6	6
16	(Australia) C Dellacqua	2	6	6
2	(Australia) S Stosur	6	2	2

Quarterfinals
(Japan) K Date-Krumm	1	0
16	(Australia) C Dellacqua	6	6

== Qualifying ==
=== Seeds ===
1. (Croatia) Mirjana Lučić-Baroni (first round)
2. (Hungary) Tímea Babos (qualifying competition, lucky loser)
3. (Russia) Alla Kudryavtseva (first round)
4. (Thailand) Luksika Kumkhum (first round)
5. (Ukraine) Nadiia Kichenok (qualified)
6. (Serbia) Vesna Dolonc (qualifying competition)
7. (United States) Victoria Duval (qualified)
8. (Spain) Estrella Cabeza Candela (withdrew)
9. (United States) Grace Min (qualifying competition)
10. (France) Alizé Lim (first round)
11. (Ukraine) Maryna Zanevska (qualifying competition)
12. (United States) Shelby Rogers (qualifying competition)
13. (Canada) Aleksandra Wozniak (qualified)
14. (Austria) Tamira Paszek (qualified)
15. (United States) Irina Falconi (qualified)
16. (United States) Melanie Oudin (first round)

=== Qualifiers ===
1. (Ukraine) Lyudmyla Kichenok
2. (United Kingdom) Katy Dunne
3. ~~(United States) Irina Falconi~~
4. (Canada) Aleksandra Wozniak
5. (Ukraine) Nadiia Kichenok
6. (Austria) Tamira Paszek
7. (United States) Victoria Duval
8. (Greece) Eleni Daniilidou

=== Lucky losers ===
1. (Hungary) Tímea Babos

=== Qualifying draw ===
==== First qualifier ====
First round
1	(Croatia) Mirjana Lučić-Baroni	4	6^{6}
(Ukraine) Lyudmyla Kichenok	6	7^{8}
WC	(United Kingdom) Manisha Foster	1	2
11	(Ukraine) Maryna Zanevska	6	6

Qualifying competition
(Ukraine) Lyudmyla Kichenok	5	6	7
11	(Ukraine) Maryna Zanevska	7	3	5

==== Second qualifier ====
First round
2	(Hungary) Tímea Babos	6	6
WC	(United Kingdom) Harriet Dart	3	2
WC	(United Kingdom) Katy Dunne	6^{4}	6	6
10	(France) Alizé Lim	7^{7}	2	4

Qualifying competition
2	(Hungary) Tímea Babos	2	6^{4}
WC	(United Kingdom) Katy Dunne	6	7^{7}

==== Third qualifier ====
First round
3	(Russia) Alla Kudryavtseva	1	4
(Japan) Shuko Aoyama	6	6
(Australia) Ashleigh Barty	4	4
15	(United States) Irina Falconi	6	6

Qualifying competition
(Japan) Shuko Aoyama	2	2
15	(United States) Irina Falconi	6	6

==== Fourth qualifier ====
First round
4	(Thailand) Luksika Kumkhum	2	1
(Australia) Anastasia Rodionova	6	6
(Georgia (country)) Oksana Kalashnikova	3	2
13	(Canada) Aleksandra Wozniak	6	6

Qualifying competition
(Australia) Anastasia Rodionova	7	3	2
13	(Canada) Aleksandra Wozniak	5	6	6

==== Fifth qualifier ====
First round
5	(Ukraine) Nadiia Kichenok	2	6	7
(United States) Sachia Vickery	6	4	5
Alt	(United States) Abigail Spears	2	7^{7}	5
9	(United States) Grace Min	6	6^{5}	7

Qualifying competition
5	(Ukraine) Nadiia Kichenok	6	3	6
9	(United States) Grace Min	3	6	2

==== Sixth qualifier ====
First round
6	(Serbia) Vesna Dolonc	6	6
(Japan) Risa Ozaki	4	4
WC	(United Kingdom) Emily Webley-Smith	3	4
14	(Austria) Tamira Paszek	6	6

Qualifying competition
6	(Serbia) Vesna Dolonc	5	4
14	(Austria) Tamira Paszek	7	6

==== Seventh qualifier ====
First round
7	(United States) Victoria Duval	6	6
(Chinese Taipei) Chan Yung-jan	1	4
(Canada) Gabriela Dabrowski	6	6
16	(United States) Melanie Oudin	1	2

Qualifying competition
7	(United States) Victoria Duval	6	6
(Canada) Gabriela Dabrowski	0	3

==== Eighth qualifier ====
First round
Alt	(United States) Raquel Kops-Jones	6^{5}	6^{4}
(Greece) Eleni Daniilidou	7^{7}	7^{7}
(United Kingdom) Tara Moore	4	4
12	(United States) Shelby Rogers	6	6

Qualifying competition
(Greece) Eleni Daniilidou	6	6
12	(United States) Shelby Rogers	3	2
