= 2014 Aegon Classic =

- Date: 9–15 June
- Edition: 33rd
- Category: WTA Premier
- Draw: 64S / 16D
- Prize money: $710,000
- Surface: Grass
- Location: Birmingham, United Kingdom
- Venue: Edgbaston Priory Club

Champions

Singles
- (Serbia) Ana Ivanovic

Doubles
- (United States) Raquel Kops-Jones / (United States) Abigail Spears
← 2013 ·	Birmingham Classic	· 2015 →

The 2014 Aegon Classic was a women's tennis tournament played on outdoor grass courts. It was the 33rd edition of the event, and the first edition of the event as a Premier tournament on the 2014 WTA Tour. It took place at the Edgbaston Priory Club in Birmingham, United Kingdom, on 9–15 June 2014. First-seeded Ana Ivanovic won the singles title.

== Points and prize money ==
=== Point distribution ===
Event	W	F	SF	QF	Round of 16	Round of 32	Round of 64	Q	Q2	Q1
Singles	470	305	185	100	55	30	1	25	13	1
Doubles	470	305	185	100	1	—	—	—	—	—

=== Prize money ===
The total commitment prize money for this year's event was $710,000

Event	W	F	SF	QF	Round of 16	Round of 32	Round of 64	Q2	Q1
Singles	$120,000	$64,000	$31,510	$16,200	$8,400	$4,300	$2,200	$1,000	$600
Doubles	$38,000	$20,000	$11,000	$5,600	$3,035	—	—	—	—

== Singles main draw entrants ==
=== Seeds ===
Country	Player	Rank^{1}	Seed
SRB	Ana Ivanovic	12	1
AUS	Samantha Stosur	18	2
USA	Sloane Stephens	19	3
BEL	Kirsten Flipkens	22	4
CZE	Lucie Šafářová	24	5
CZE	Klára Koukalová	30	6
SVK	Daniela Hantuchová	31	7
SVK	Magdaléna Rybáriková	34	8
CHN	Zhang Shuai	36	9
SRB	Bojana Jovanovski	37	10
USA	Madison Keys	40	11
PUR	Monica Puig	41	12
FRA	Caroline Garcia	43	13
JPN	Kurumi Nara	44	14
USA	Alison Riske	45	15
AUS	Casey Dellacqua	48	16

- ^{1} Rankings as of 26 May 2014

=== Other entrants ===
The following players received wildcards into the main draw:

- (United Kingdom) Naomi Broady
- (United Kingdom) Johanna Konta
- (United Kingdom) Heather Watson

The following players received entry from the qualifying draw:

- (Greece) Eleni Daniilidou
- (United Kingdom) Katy Dunne
- (United States) Victoria Duval
- ~~(United States) Irina Falconi~~
- (Ukraine) Lyudmyla Kichenok
- (Ukraine) Nadiya Kichenok
- (Austria) Tamira Paszek
- (Canada) Aleksandra Wozniak

The following player received entry into the main draw as a lucky loser:

- (Hungary) Tímea Babos

=== Withdrawals ===
Before the tournament

- (Canada) Eugenie Bouchard → replaced by (Belgium) Alison Van Uytvanck
- (Romania) Sorana Cîrstea → replaced by (Japan) Kimiko Date-Krumm
- (United States) Irina Falconi (viral illness) → replaced by (Hungary) Tímea Babos
- (Italy) Karin Knapp → replaced by (Germany) Mona Barthel
- (Germany) Sabine Lisicki (wrist injury) → replaced by (Czech Republic) Petra Cetkovská
- (Austria) Yvonne Meusburger → replaced by (Israel) Shahar Peer
- (Bulgaria) Tsvetana Pironkova → replaced by (Kazakhstan) Zarina Diyas

=== Retirements ===
- (United Kingdom) Katy Dunne (hip injury)

== Doubles main draw entrants ==
=== Seeds ===
Country	Player	Country	Player	Rank^{1}	Seed
ZIM	Cara Black	IND	Sania Mirza	18	1
AUS	Ashleigh Barty	AUS	Casey Dellacqua	29	2
USA	Raquel Kops-Jones	USA	Abigail Spears	32	3
RUS	Alla Kudryavtseva	AUS	Anastasia Rodionova	40	4

- ^{1} Rankings as of 26 May 2014

=== Other entrants ===
The following pair received a wildcard into the doubles main draw:

- (United Kingdom) Naomi Broady / (United Kingdom) Heather Watson

== Finals ==
=== Singles ===
- (Serbia) Ana Ivanovic defeated (Czech Republic) Barbora Záhlavová-Strýcová, 6–3, 6–2

=== Doubles ===
- (United States) Raquel Kops-Jones / (United States) Abigail Spears defeated (Australia) Ashleigh Barty / (Australia) Casey Dellacqua, 7–6^{(7–1)}, 6–1
