= 2013 Aegon Classic – Doubles =

Doubles
- 2013 Aegon Classic

Final
- Champions: (Australia) Ashleigh Barty (Australia) Casey Dellacqua
- Runners-up: (Zimbabwe) Cara Black (New Zealand) Marina Erakovic
- Score: 7–5, 6–4

Events
Singles	Doubles
← 2012 ·	Birmingham Classic	· 2014 →

Tímea Babos and Hsieh Su-wei were the defending champions, but Babos decided not to participate.
Hsieh played alongside Daniela Hantuchová, but they withdrew in the quarterfinals due to Hsieh upper respiratory illness.
Third seeded Ashleigh Barty and Casey Dellacqua won the final over Cara Black and Marina Erakovic with the score of 7–5, 6–4.

== Seeds ==
1. (United States) Raquel Kops-Jones / (United States) Abigail Spears (quarterfinals)
2. (Chinese Taipei) Chan Hao-ching / (United States) Liezel Huber (quarterfinals)
3. (Australia) Ashleigh Barty / (Australia) Casey Dellacqua (champions)
4. (Slovakia) Daniela Hantuchová / (Chinese Taipei) Hsieh Su-wei (quarterfinals, withdrew)

== Draw ==
=== Key ===
- Q = Qualifier
- WC = Wild card
- LL = Lucky loser
- Alt = Alternate
- SE = Special exempt
- PR = Protected ranking
- ITF = ITF entry
- JE = Junior exempt
- w/o = Walkover
- r = Retired
- d = Defaulted
- SR = Special ranking

=== Draw ===
First round
1	(United States) R Kops-Jones (United States) A Spears	6	6
Alt	(Colombia) C Castaño (Greece) E Daniilidou	1	1
(Germany) M Barthel (France) K Mladenovic	w/o
(Russia) V Dushevina (United Kingdom) H Watson
3	(Australia) A Barty (Australia) C Dellacqua	6	6
(South Africa) N Grandin (Czech Republic) V Uhlířová	4	4
(Canada) G Dabrowski (United States) I Falconi	4	4
(Russia) A Kudryavtseva (Australia) A Rodionova	6	6
(Japan) K Date-Krumm (Spain) A Parra Santonja	6	7
(Japan) S Aoyama (United States) M Moulton-Levy	1	5
(Croatia) D Jurak (Thailand) T Tanasugarn	6	1	[2]
4	(Slovakia) D Hantuchová (Chinese Taipei) S-w Hsieh	3	6	[10]
(United States) L Raymond (United Kingdom) L Robson	4	2
(Zimbabwe) C Black (New Zealand) M Erakovic	6	6
WC	(United Kingdom) T Moore (United Kingdom) M South	7	2	[3]
2	(Chinese Taipei) H-c Chan (United States) L Huber	5	6	[10]

Quarter-finals
1	(United States) R Kops-Jones (United States) A Spears	6	5	[6]
(Germany) M Barthel (France) K Mladenovic	2	7	[10]
3	(Australia) A Barty (Australia) C Dellacqua	7^{7}	4	[10]
(Russia) A Kudryavtseva (Australia) A Rodionova	6^{0}	6	[5]
(Japan) K Date-Krumm (Spain) A Parra Santonja	w/o
4	(Slovakia) D Hantuchová (Chinese Taipei) S-w Hsieh
(Zimbabwe) C Black (New Zealand) M Erakovic	2	6	[10]
2	(Chinese Taipei) H-c Chan (United States) L Huber	6	3	[7]

Semi-finals
(Germany) M Barthel (France) K Mladenovic	3	2
3	(Australia) A Barty (Australia) C Dellacqua	6	6
(Japan) K Date-Krumm (Spain) A Parra Santonja	5	6	[6]
(Zimbabwe) C Black (New Zealand) M Erakovic	7	4	[10]

Final
3	(Australia) A Barty (Australia) C Dellacqua	7	6
(Zimbabwe) C Black (New Zealand) M Erakovic	5	4
