= 2015 Aegon Classic – Doubles =

Doubles
- 2015 Aegon Classic

Final
- Champions: (Spain) Garbiñe Muguruza (Spain) Carla Suárez Navarro
- Runners-up: (Czech Republic) Andrea Hlaváčková (Czech Republic) Lucie Hradecká
- Score: 6–4, 6–4

Events
Singles	Doubles
← 2014 ·	Birmingham Classic	· 2016 →

Raquel Kops-Jones and Abigail Spears were the defending champions, but lost in the quarterfinals to Andrea Hlaváčková and Lucie Hradecká.
Garbiñe Muguruza and Carla Suárez Navarro won the title, defeating Hlaváčková and Hradecká in the final, 6–4, 6–4.

== Seeds ==
1. (Australia) Casey Dellacqua / (India) Sania Mirza (first round)
2. (Hungary) Tímea Babos / (France) Kristina Mladenovic (quarterfinals, withdrew)
3. (United States) Raquel Kops-Jones / (United States) Abigail Spears (quarterfinals)
4. (Spain) Garbiñe Muguruza / (Spain) Carla Suárez Navarro (champions)

== Draw ==
=== Key ===
- Q = Qualifier
- WC = Wild card
- LL = Lucky loser
- Alt = Alternate
- SE = Special exempt
- PR = Protected ranking
- ITF = ITF entry
- JE = Junior exempt
- w/o = Walkover
- r = Retired
- d = Defaulted
- SR = Special ranking

First round
1	(Australia) C Dellacqua (India) S Mirza	4	2
(Chinese Taipei) Y-j Chan (China) J Zheng	6	6
(Spain) A Medina Garrigues (Spain) A Parra Santonja	6	3	[7]
WC	(Romania) S Halep (United Kingdom) H Watson	1	6	[10]
4	(Spain) G Muguruza (Spain) C Suárez Navarro	6	6^{5}	[10]
(Australia) An Rodionova (Australia) Ar Rodionova	4	7^{7}	5
(France) C Garcia (Slovenia) K Srebotnik	4	3
(Russia) A Kudryavtseva (Russia) A Pavlyuchenkova	6	6
(Czech Republic) A Hlaváčková (Czech Republic) L Hradecká	6	6
WC	(United Kingdom) J Rae (United Kingdom) A Smith	4	1
(Germany) J Görges (Germany) A-L Grönefeld	4	3
3	(United States) R Kops-Jones (United States) A Spears	6	6
WC	(Canada) E Bouchard (Russia) S Kuznetsova	2	3
(Netherlands) M Krajicek (Czech Republic) B Strýcová	6	6
(Chinese Taipei) H-c Chan (Slovenia) A Klepač	5	6	[6]
2	(Hungary) T Babos (France) K Mladenovic	7	4	[10]

Quarterfinals
(Chinese Taipei) Y-j Chan (China) J Zheng	w/o
WC	(Romania) S Halep (United Kingdom) H Watson
4	(Spain) G Muguruza (Spain) C Suárez Navarro	6	4	[10]
(Russia) A Kudryavtseva (Russia) A Pavlyuchenkova	4	6	[7]
(Czech Republic) A Hlaváčková (Czech Republic) L Hradecká	3	6	[10]
3	(United States) R Kops-Jones (United States) A Spears	6	3	[8]
(Netherlands) M Krajicek (Czech Republic) B Strýcová	w/o
2	(Hungary) T Babos (France) K Mladenovic

Semifinals
(Chinese Taipei) Y-j Chan (China) J Zheng	5	3
4	(Spain) G Muguruza (Spain) C Suárez Navarro	7	6
(Czech Republic) A Hlaváčková (Czech Republic) L Hradecká	6	6
(Netherlands) M Krajicek (Czech Republic) B Strýcová	2	2

Final
4	(Spain) G Muguruza (Spain) C Suárez Navarro	6	6
(Czech Republic) A Hlaváčková (Czech Republic) L Hradecká	4	4
