= 2015 Aegon Classic – Singles =

Singles
- 2015 Aegon Classic

Final
- Champion: (Germany) Angelique Kerber
- Runner-up: (Czech Republic) Karolína Plíšková
- Score: 6–7^{(5–7)}, 6–3, 7–6^{(7–4)}

Details
- Draw: 56 (8 Q / 4 WC )
- Seeds: 16

Events
Singles	Doubles
← 2014 ·	Birmingham Classic	· 2016 →

Ana Ivanovic was the defending champion, but lost in the second round to Michelle Larcher de Brito.

Angelique Kerber won the title, defeating Karolína Plíšková in the final, 6–7^{(5–7)}, 6–3, 7–6^{(7–4)}.

== Seeds ==
The top eight seeds received a bye into the second round.

1. (Romania) Simona Halep (quarterfinals)
2. (Serbia) Ana Ivanovic (second round)
3. (Spain) Carla Suárez Navarro (quarterfinals)
4. (Germany) Angelique Kerber (champion)
5. (Canada) Eugenie Bouchard (second round)
6. (Czech Republic) Karolína Plíšková (final)
7. (Germany) Andrea Petkovic (second round)
8. (Germany) Sabine Lisicki (semifinals)
9. (Spain) Garbiñe Muguruza (first round)
10. (Czech Republic) Barbora Strýcová (third round)
11. (France) Alizé Cornet (first round)
12. (Belarus) Victoria Azarenka (second round, withdrew due to foot injury)
13. (Russia) Svetlana Kuznetsova (third round)
14. (Romania) Irina-Camelia Begu (first round)
15. (Serbia) Jelena Janković (third round)
16. (France) Caroline Garcia (second round)

Click on the seed number of a player to go to their draw section.

== Draw ==
=== Key ===
- Q = Qualifier
- WC = Wild card
- LL = Lucky loser
- Alt = Alternate
- ITF = ITF entry
- PR = Protected ranking
- SR = Special ranking
- SE = Special exempt
- JE = Junior exempt
- JR = Junior Accelerator Programme entrant
- CO = College Accelerator Programme entrant
- NG = Next Gen Accelerator Program entrant
- w/o = Walkover
- r = Retired
- d = Defaulted

=== Finals ===
Quarterfinals
1	(Romania) Simona Halep	6	0	6^{4}
(France) Kristina Mladenovic	2	6	7^{7}
3	(Spain) Carla Suárez Navarro	2	2
6	(Czech Republic) Karolína Plíšková	6	6
(Czech Republic) Kateřina Siniaková	2	4
4	(Germany) Angelique Kerber	6	6
8	(Germany) Sabine Lisicki	7^{7}	6
(Slovakia) Daniela Hantuchová	6^{2}	2

Semifinals
(France) Kristina Mladenovic	2	6^{6}
6	(Czech Republic) Karolína Plíšková	6	7^{8}
4	(Germany) Angelique Kerber	6	6
8	(Germany) Sabine Lisicki	3	3

Final
6	(Czech Republic) Karolína Plíšková	7^{7}	3	6^{4}
4	(Germany) Angelique Kerber	6^{5}	6	7^{7}

=== Top half ===
==== Section 1 ====
First round
WC	(United Kingdom) N Broady	6	6
(Croatia) A Tomljanović	3	4
(United States) C Vandeweghe	5	3
Q	(Czech Republic) K Koukalová	7	6
Q	(Germany) T Maria	2	6	6^{6}
16	(France) C Garcia	6	2	7^{8}
10	(Czech Republic) B Strýcová	6	3	6
(Romania) M Niculescu	2	6	2
(Ukraine) L Tsurenko	4	3
(Czech Republic) L Hradecká	6	6
(France) K Mladenovic	6	7^{9}
(United States) A Riske	3	6^{7}

Second round
1	(Romania) S Halep	6	6
WC	(United Kingdom) N Broady	4	2
Q	(Czech Republic) K Koukalová	6	6
16	(France) C Garcia	3	0
10	(Czech Republic) B Strýcová	6	6
(Czech Republic) L Hradecká	3	4
(France) K Mladenovic	6	4	6
5/WC	(Canada) E Bouchard	3	6	0

Third round
1	(Romania) S Halep	6	6
Q	(Czech Republic) K Koukalová	1	3
10	(Czech Republic) B Strýcová	6^{4}	2
(France) K Mladenovic	7^{7}	6

Quarterfinals
1	(Romania) S Halep	6	0	6^{4}
(France) K Mladenovic	2	6	7^{7}

==== Section 2 ====
First round
(Italy) R Vinci	2	7^{7}	6^{5}
Q	(Hungary) T Babos	6	6^{5}	7^{7}
(United Kingdom) H Watson	6^{5}	4
Q	(Serbia) A Krunić	7^{7}	6
(Italy) K Knapp	6^{4}	7	2
13	(Russia) S Kuznetsova	7^{7}	5	6
12	(Belarus) V Azarenka	7^{9}	6
(United States) V Lepchenko	6^{7}	4
Q	(Ukraine) K Bondarenko	6^{7}	6^{5}
(Kazakhstan) Z Diyas	7^{9}	7^{7}
WC	(United Kingdom) J Konta	6	6
(Australia) J Gajdošová	1	3

Second round
3	(Spain) C Suárez Navarro	6	3	6
Q	(Hungary) T Babos	2	6	4
Q	(Serbia) A Krunić	2	1
13	(Russia) S Kuznetsova	6	6
12	(Belarus) V Azarenka
(Kazakhstan) Z Diyas	w/o
WC	(United Kingdom) J Konta	6	3	4
6	(Czech Republic) Ka Plíšková	3	6	6

Third round
3	(Spain) C Suárez Navarro	6	6
13	(Russia) S Kuznetsova	3	4
(Kazakhstan) Z Diyas	2	2
6	(Czech Republic) Ka Plíšková	6	6

Quarterfinals
3	(Spain) C Suárez Navarro	2	2
6	(Czech Republic) Ka Plíšková	6	6

=== Bottom half ===
==== Section 3 ====
First round
(Czech Republic) K Siniaková	6	7^{7}
(Japan) K Nara	3	6^{3}
(Puerto Rico) M Puig	4	1
Q	(Japan) M Doi	6	6
(United States) C McHale	4	6	6
11	(France) A Cornet	6	2	2
15/WC	(Serbia) J Janković	6	6
(Czech Republic) T Smitková	4	4
(Australia) C Dellacqua	6	6
(United States) L Davis	4	1
(Bulgaria) T Pironkova	6	6
WC	(United Kingdom) K Swan	2	2

Second round
7	(Germany) A Petkovic	6	1	6^{4}
(Czech Republic) K Siniaková	4	6	7^{7}
Q	(Japan) M Doi	3	4
(United States) C McHale	6	6
15/WC	(Serbia) J Janković	7^{13}	6
(Australia) C Dellacqua	6^{11}	3
(Bulgaria) T Pironkova	4	6	4
4	(Germany) A Kerber	6	2	6

Third round
(Czech Republic) K Siniaková	6	6
(United States) C McHale	4	0
15/WC	(Serbia) J Janković	4	2
4	(Germany) A Kerber	6	6

Quarterfinals
(Czech Republic) K Siniaková	2	4
4	(Germany) A Kerber	6	6

==== Section 4 ====
First round
(Croatia) M Lučić-Baroni	5	3
(Switzerland) B Bencic	7	6
(Slovakia) AK Schmiedlová	6	6
(Serbia) B Jovanovski	2	3
(Slovakia) M Rybáriková	6	6
9	(Spain) G Muguruza	3	1
14	(Romania) I-C Begu	6	6^{10}	4
(Slovakia) D Hantuchová	4	7^{12}	6
PR	(Czech Republic) P Cetkovská	4	2
Q	(New Zealand) M Erakovic	6	6
LL	(China) S Zheng	3	2
Q	(Portugal) M Larcher de Brito	6	6

Second round
8	(Germany) S Lisicki	6	7^{7}
(Switzerland) B Bencic	1	6^{4}
(Slovakia) AK Schmiedlová	6^{0}	1
(Slovakia) M Rybáriková	7^{7}	6
(Slovakia) D Hantuchová	7^{8}	6
Q	(New Zealand) M Erakovic	6^{6}	4
Q	(Portugal) M Larcher de Brito	6	3	7^{8}
2	(Serbia) A Ivanovic	4	6	6^{6}

Third round
8	(Germany) S Lisicki	7^{9}	6
(Slovakia) M Rybáriková	6^{7}	4
(Slovakia) D Hantuchová	6	7
Q	(Portugal) M Larcher de Brito	4	5

Quarterfinals
8	(Germany) S Lisicki	7^{7}	6
(Slovakia) D Hantuchová	6^{2}	2

== Qualifying ==
=== Seeds ===
1. (Germany) Carina Witthöft (first round)
2. (Serbia) Bojana Jovanovski (moved to main draw)
3. (China) Zheng Saisai (qualifying competition, lucky loser)
4. (United States) Irina Falconi (qualifying competition)
5. (Italy) Francesca Schiavone (first round)
6. (Belgium) Kirsten Flipkens (qualifying competition)
7. (Germany) Tatjana Maria (qualified)
8. (United States) Shelby Rogers (first round, retired)
9. (Czech Republic) Klára Koukalová (qualified)
10. (Croatia) Ana Konjuh (withdrew, still playing in Nottingham)
11. (Serbia) Aleksandra Krunić (qualified)
12. (Hungary) Tímea Babos (qualified)
13. (Belgium) Yanina Wickmayer (qualifying competition)
14. (Kazakhstan) Yulia Putintseva (first round)
15. (New Zealand) Marina Erakovic (qualified)
16. (Japan) Misaki Doi (qualified)
17. (Colombia) Mariana Duque Mariño (qualifying competition)

=== Qualifiers ===
1. (Serbia) Aleksandra Krunić
2. (Hungary) Tímea Babos
3. (Czech Republic) Klára Koukalová
4. (Portugal) Michelle Larcher de Brito
5. (Japan) Misaki Doi
6. (New Zealand) Marina Erakovic
7. (Germany) Tatjana Maria
8. (Ukraine) Kateryna Bondarenko

=== Lucky loser ===
1. (China) Zheng Saisai

=== Draw ===
==== First qualifier ====
First round
1	(Germany) Carina Witthöft	6^{5}	7^{7}	5
(United States) Nicole Gibbs	7^{7}	6^{1}	7
WC	(United Kingdom) Sara Beth Askew	2	1
11	(Serbia) Aleksandra Krunić	6	6

Qualifying competition
(United States) Nicole Gibbs	4	7^{7}	3
11	(Serbia) Aleksandra Krunić	6	6^{4}	6

==== Second qualifier ====
First round
17	(Colombia) Mariana Duque Mariño	6	6
(Slovakia) Jana Čepelová	1	1
(Poland) Urszula Radwańska	3	3
12	(Hungary) Tímea Babos	6	6

Qualifying competition
17	(Colombia) Mariana Duque Mariño	7^{7}	6^{3}	4
12	(Hungary) Tímea Babos	6^{5}	7^{7}	6

==== Third qualifier ====
First round
3	(China) Zheng Saisai	4	6	7
WC	(United Kingdom) Emily Webley-Smith	6	2	5
(United States) Louisa Chirico	6^{5}	4
9	(Czech Republic) Klára Koukalová	7^{7}	6

Qualifying competition
3	(China) Zheng Saisai	1	1
9	(Czech Republic) Klára Koukalová	6	6

==== Fourth qualifier ====
First round
4	(United States) Irina Falconi	6	6
(Russia) Margarita Gasparyan	3	3
(Portugal) Michelle Larcher de Brito	6	6
14	(Kazakhstan) Yulia Putintseva	1	4

Qualifying competition
4	(United States) Irina Falconi	0	6	2
(Portugal) Michelle Larcher de Brito	6	2	6

==== Fifth qualifier ====
First round
5	(Italy) Francesca Schiavone	4	3
(Russia) Elizaveta Kulichkova	6	6
WC	(United Kingdom) Naomi Cavaday	1	2
16	(Japan) Misaki Doi	6	6

Qualifying competition
(Russia) Elizaveta Kulichkova	6	1	6^{4}
16	(Japan) Misaki Doi	4	6	7^{7}

==== Sixth qualifier ====
First round
6	(Belgium) Kirsten Flipkens	7^{7}	7
WC	(United Kingdom) Harriet Dart	6^{2}	5
(Russia) Alla Kudryavtseva	1	2
15	(New Zealand) Marina Erakovic	6	6

Qualifying competition
6	(Belgium) Kirsten Flipkens	6	6^{1}	6^{4}
15	(New Zealand) Marina Erakovic	4	7^{7}	7^{7}

==== Seventh qualifier ====
First round
7	(Germany) Tatjana Maria	6	6
(United States) Anna Tatishvili	1	3
(Switzerland) Stefanie Vögele	2	0^{r}
Alt	(Turkey) Çağla Büyükakçay	6	2

Qualifying competition
7	(Germany) Tatjana Maria	6	6
Alt	(Turkey) Çağla Büyükakçay	4	3

==== Eighth qualifier ====
First round
8	(United States) Shelby Rogers	4^{r}
Alt	(Ukraine) Kateryna Bondarenko	3
(United States) Grace Min	1	1
13	(Belgium) Yanina Wickmayer	6	6

Qualifying competition
Alt	(Ukraine) Kateryna Bondarenko	4	7^{7}	6
13	(Belgium) Yanina Wickmayer	6	6^{5}	3
