= 2013 Aegon Classic =

- Date: 10–16 June
- Edition: 32nd
- Draw: 56S / 16D
- Prize money: $235,000
- Surface: Grass
- Location: Birmingham, United Kingdom
- Venue: Edgbaston Priory Club

Champions

Singles
- (Slovakia) Daniela Hantuchová

Doubles
- (Australia) Ashleigh Barty / (Australia) Casey Dellacqua
← 2012 ·	Birmingham Classic	· 2014 →

The 2013 Aegon Classic was a women's tennis tournament played on outdoor grass courts. It was the 32nd edition of the event. It took place at the Edgbaston Priory Club in Birmingham, United Kingdom, between 10 and 16 June 2013. Unseeded Daniela Hantuchová won the singles title.

== Singles main-draw entrants ==
=== Seeds ===
Country	Player	Rank^{1}	Seed
BEL	Kirsten Flipkens	21	1
RUS	Ekaterina Makarova	22	2
ROU	Sorana Cîrstea	30	3
AUT	Tamira Paszek	33	4
GER	Sabine Lisicki	34	5
GER	Mona Barthel	35	6
GBR	Laura Robson	37	7
POL	Urszula Radwańska	40	8
BEL	Yanina Wickmayer	41	9
TPE	Hsieh Su-wei	42	10
JPN	Ayumi Morita	44	11
FRA	Kristina Mladenovic	46	12
SRB	Bojana Jovanovski	47	13
GBR	Heather Watson	48	14
ITA	Francesca Schiavone	50	15
SVK	Magdaléna Rybáriková	52	16

- ^{1} Rankings are as of May 27, 2013.

=== Other entrants ===
The following players received wildcards into the main draw:

- (United Kingdom) Anne Keothavong
- (United Kingdom) Johanna Konta
- (United Kingdom) Tara Moore

The following players received entry from the qualifying draw:

- (Australia) Casey Dellacqua
- (Ukraine) Nadiia Kichenok
- (Russia) Alla Kudryavtseva
- (Japan) Kurumi Nara
- (United States) Alison Riske
- (United States) Maria Sanchez
- (Croatia) Ajla Tomljanović
- (Belgium) Alison Van Uytvanck

=== Withdrawals ===
Before the tournament

- (France) Marion Bartoli
- (United States) Mallory Burdette
- (Spain) Garbiñe Muguruza
- (Italy) Roberta Vinci

== Doubles main-draw entrants ==
=== Seeds ===
Country	Player	Country	Player	Rank^{1}	Seed
USA	Raquel Kops-Jones	USA	Abigail Spears	29	1
TPE	Chan Hao-ching	USA	Liezel Huber	52	2
AUS	Ashleigh Barty	AUS	Casey Dellacqua	66	3
SVK	Daniela Hantuchová	TPE	Hsieh Su-wei	67	4

- ^{1} Rankings are as of May 27, 2013.

=== Other entrants ===
The following pairs received wildcards into the doubles main draw:

- (United Kingdom) Anne Keothavong / (United Kingdom) Johanna Konta
- (United Kingdom) Samantha Moore / (United Kingdom) Melanie South

The following pair entry as alternates:

- (Colombia) Catalina Castaño / (Greece) Eleni Daniilidou

=== Withdrawals ===
Before the tournament

- (United Kingdom) Johanna Konta (low back injury)

During the tournament

- (United Kingdom) Heather Watson (mid back injury)

== Finals ==
=== Singles ===
- (Slovakia) Daniela Hantuchová defeated (Croatia) Donna Vekić, 7–6^{(7–5)}, 6–4

=== Doubles ===
- (Australia) Ashleigh Barty / (Australia) Casey Dellacqua defeated (Zimbabwe) Cara Black / (New Zealand) Marina Erakovic, 7–5, 6–4
