= 2014 Aegon Classic – Doubles =

Doubles
- 2014 Aegon Classic

Final
- Champions: (United States) Raquel Kops-Jones (United States) Abigail Spears
- Runners-up: (Australia) Ashleigh Barty (Australia) Casey Dellacqua
- Score: 7–6^{(7–1)}, 6–1

Events
Singles	Doubles
← 2013 ·	Birmingham Classic	· 2015 →

Ashleigh Barty and Casey Dellacqua were the defending champions, but lost in the final to Raquel Kops-Jones and Abigail Spears, 6–7^{(1–7)}, 1–6.

== Seeds ==
1. (Zimbabwe) Cara Black / (India) Sania Mirza (semifinals)
2. (Australia) Ashleigh Barty / (Australia) Casey Dellacqua (final)
3. (United States) Raquel Kops-Jones / (United States) Abigail Spears (champions)
4. (Russia) Alla Kudryavtseva / (Australia) Anastasia Rodionova (first round)

== Draw ==
=== Key ===
- Q = Qualifier
- WC = Wild card
- LL = Lucky loser
- Alt = Alternate
- SE = Special exempt
- PR = Protected ranking
- ITF = ITF entry
- JE = Junior exempt
- w/o = Walkover
- r = Retired
- d = Defaulted
- SR = Special ranking

=== Draw ===
First round
1	(Zimbabwe) C Black (India) S Mirza	6	6
(Georgia (country)) O Kalashnikova (China) J Zheng	3	3
(Czech Republic) K Koukalová (Czech Republic) L Šafářová	6	1	[8]
(Croatia) D Jurak (United States) M Moulton-Levy	4	6	[10]
3	(United States) R Kops-Jones (United States) A Spears	6	6
(Poland) A Rosolska (Ukraine) O Savchuk	2	1
(Chinese Taipei) H-c Chan (Chinese Taipei) Y-j Chan	7	4	[10]
(Slovakia) D Hantuchová (Croatia) M Lučić-Baroni	5	6	[7]
(France) C Garcia (China) S Zhang	4	6	[10]
WC	(United Kingdom) N Broady (United Kingdom) H Watson	6	3	[5]
(Japan) K Date-Krumm (Czech Republic) B Záhlavová-Strýcová	7	6
4	(Russia) A Kudryavtseva (Australia) A Rodionova	5	2
(United States) L Huber (United States) L Raymond	6	7^{7}
(New Zealand) M Erakovic (Spain) A Parra Santonja	4	6^{0}
(Hungary) T Babos (France) K Mladenovic	7	6^{3}	[10]
2	(Australia) A Barty (Australia) C Dellacqua	5	7^{7}	[12]

Quarter-finals
1	(Zimbabwe) C Black (India) S Mirza	6	5	[10]
(Croatia) D Jurak (United States) M Moulton-Levy	1	7	[6]
3	(United States) R Kops-Jones (United States) A Spears	6^{5}	7^{7}	[10]
(Chinese Taipei) H-c Chan (Chinese Taipei) Y-j Chan	7^{7}	6^{5}	[0]
(France) C Garcia (China) S Zhang	1	6	[10]
(Japan) K Date-Krumm (Czech Republic) B Záhlavová-Strýcová	6	1	[7]
(United States) L Huber (United States) L Raymond	4	4
2	(Australia) A Barty (Australia) C Dellacqua	6	6

Semi-finals
1	(Zimbabwe) C Black (India) S Mirza	6	3	[8]
3	(United States) R Kops-Jones (United States) A Spears	3	6	[10]
(France) C Garcia (China) S Zhang	4	2
2	(Australia) A Barty (Australia) C Dellacqua	6	6

Final
3	(United States) R Kops-Jones (United States) A Spears	7^{7}	6
2	(Australia) A Barty (Australia) C Dellacqua	6^{1}	1
