= Casey Dellacqua =

Australian tennis player (born 1985)

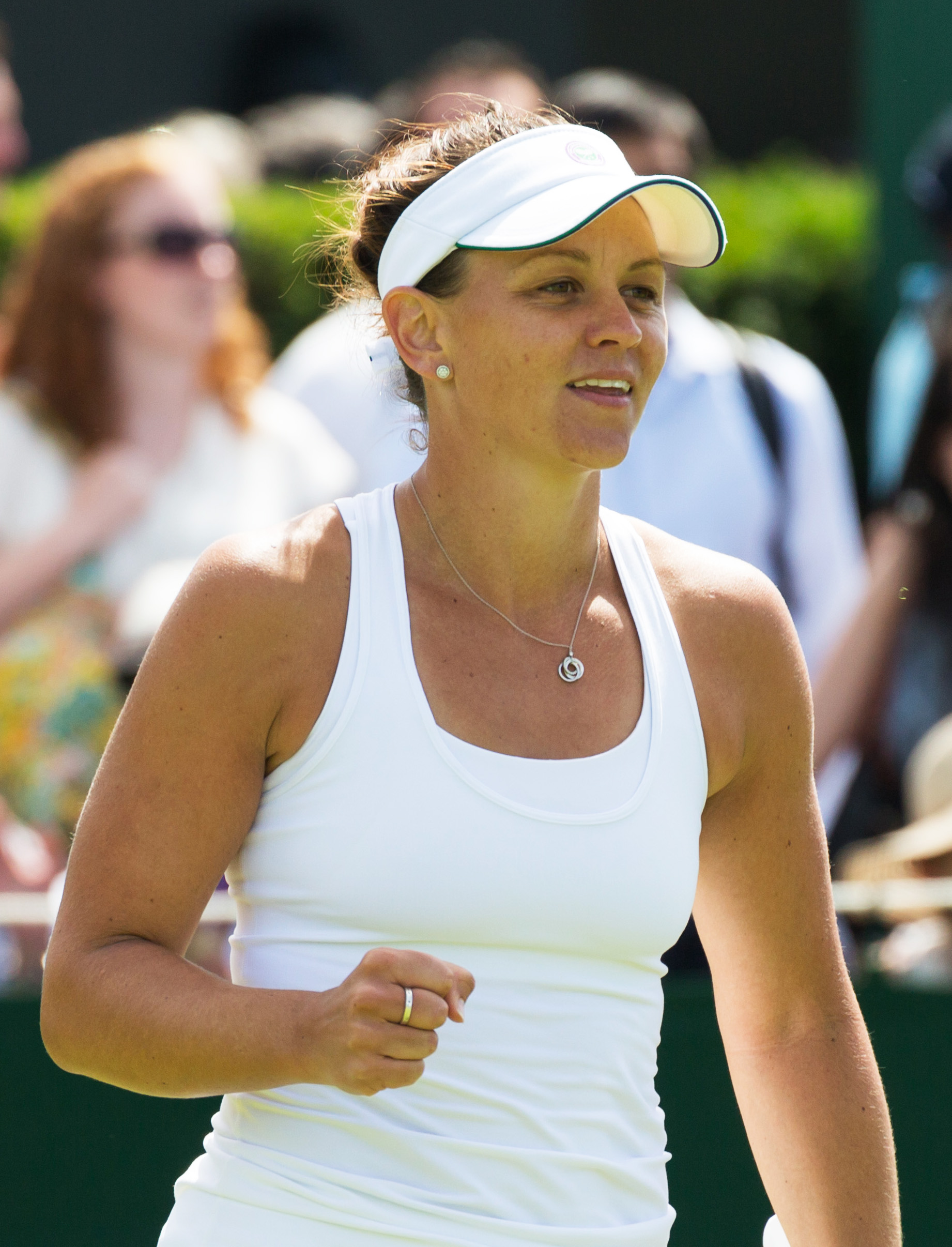
- Dellacqua at the 2015 Wimbledon Championships
- Country (sports): Australia
- Residence: Sydney, Australia
- Born: 11 February 1985 (age 41) Perth, Western Australia
- Height: 165 cm (5 ft 5 in)
- Turned pro: 2002
- Retired: 2018
- Plays: Left (two-handed backhand)
- Prize money: US$ 4,233,102

Singles
- Career record: 348–214
- Career titles: 0
- Highest ranking: No. 26 (29 September 2014)

Grand Slam singles results
- Australian Open: 4R (2008, 2014)
- French Open: 3R (2008)
- Wimbledon: 3R (2008, 2015)
- US Open: 4R (2014)

Other tournaments
- Olympic Games: 2R (2008)

Doubles
- Career record: 342–184
- Career titles: 7
- Highest ranking: No. 3 (1 February 2016)

Grand Slam doubles results
- Australian Open: F (2013)
- French Open: F (2008, 2015, 2017)
- Wimbledon: F (2013)
- US Open: F (2013, 2015)

Other doubles tournaments
- Tour Finals: QF (2017)
- Olympic Games: 1R (2008, 2012)

Mixed doubles
- Career titles: 1

Grand Slam mixed doubles results
- Australian Open: QF (2015)
- French Open: W (2011)
- Wimbledon: QF (2014)
- US Open: 2R (2008)

Team competitions
- Fed Cup: 19–9
- Hopman Cup: RR (2009, 2015)

Casey Dellacqua (/dəˈlækwə/ də-LAK-wə; born 11 February 1985) is an Australian former professional tennis player and current commentator. Her best singles results on the WTA Tour have been semifinal appearances at the 2012 Texas Tennis Open and 2014 Birmingham Classic, a quarterfinal finish at the 2014 Indian Wells Open and fourth round appearances at the 2008 Australian Open, the 2014 Australian Open and the 2014 US Open; she also won 22 ITF singles titles.

Dellacqua's career highlights, however, have all come in doubles. She has won seven WTA Tour doubles titles, 23 ITF doubles titles, and one Grand Slam mixed-doubles title, at the 2011 French Open. She reached the finals of all four major events in women's doubles, appearing in seven finals from 2008 to 2017, however failed to win a title. She won her biggest women's doubles title at the Premier Mandatory 2015 Madrid Open, partnered with Yaroslava Shvedova. Dellacqua achieved her highest singles ranking of world No. 26 in September 2014, and career-high doubles ranking of No. 3 in February 2016.

== Personal life ==
Dellacqua lived in Woodvale, Western Australia. She attended Woodvale Primary School from kindergarten to year seven and then Woodvale Senior High School, before moving to Canberra to train with the Australian Institute of Sport at the age of 16. Throughout her early life she was an active member of local tennis clubs and teams.

Dellacqua and her partner Amanda Judd have three children.

== Career overview ==
=== 2003–2007: First steps ===
From 2003 to 2007 Dellacqua won eleven singles and thirteen doubles titles on the ITF Circuit, most of them at $25k-level, spread out across Australia. She also won the $50k Bronx Open in August 2007. At the 2007 US Open, she won her first Grand Slam main-draw match against Yaroslava Shvedova, before losing to defending champion Maria Sharapova in the second round. She finished the 2007 season ranked No. 78 in singles and 123 in doubles.

=== 2008: Breakthrough ===
Dellacqua began the year by reaching the fourth round of the Australian Open and upset 15th-seeded Patty Schnyder, and former champion and world No. 1, Amélie Mauresmo, but eventually lost to third seed Jelena Janković. The performance meant she surpassed Alicia Molik to become the highest ranked Australian female tennis player.

The French Open again showed Dellacqua's improved ability as she defeated the ninth-seeded Marion Bartoli and Nathalie Dechy in the first two rounds but she was knocked out in straights sets by Carla Suárez Navarro in the third round. The doubles proved to be a highlight for Dellacqua as she teamed with Francesca Schiavone to reach the final despite being unseeded. The pair lost in three sets to Spaniards Anabel Medina Garrigues and Virginia Ruano Pascual in a match that lasted two-and-a-half hours.

For the first round of the Wimbledon Championships, Dellacqua faced the 12th-seeded Patty Schnyder, who Dellacqua had already beaten earlier this year in the second round of the Australian Open. Although she lost the first set to her again, Dellacqua had a convincing win against Schnyder. In her second round match against French player Pauline Parmentier, Dellacqua won a tight three set match. She faced Nicole Vaidišová in the third round but lost in straight sets. In the women's doubles event, Dellacqua partnered with Nathalie Dechy of France who she already partnered with at the Eastbourne Open. They started by defeating British wildcards Anna Fitzpatrick and Anna Elizabeth Hawkins in the first round. They had an easy second-round match easily beating Tatiana Perebiynis and Alicja Rosolska. They won their third round match over American qualifiers Raquel Kops-Jones and Abigail Spears and won a tight quarterfinal match against Nuria Llagostera Vives and María José Martínez Sánchez. Their Wimbledon run ended when they lost to Venus and Serena Williams in two sets. In the mixed doubles event, Dellacqua partnered with American Scott Lipsky. Dellacqua and Lipsky won their first round match against Marta Domachowska and Fernando Verdasco. In the second round, they upset seventh-seeds Mark Knowles and Yan Zi. They eventually lost to ninth-seeded Andy Ram and Nathalie Dechy.

At the 2008 Beijing Olympics, Dellacqua represented Australia in the singles event along with Alicia Molik and Samantha Stosur. Dellacqua had an easy first-round match against Gisela Dulko. In the second round, she lost to 12th-seeded Belarusian Victoria Azarenka. In the doubles event, Dellacqua partnered with fellow Australian Molik. In their first round match, they lost to the Flavia Pennetta and Francesca Schiavone in straight sets.

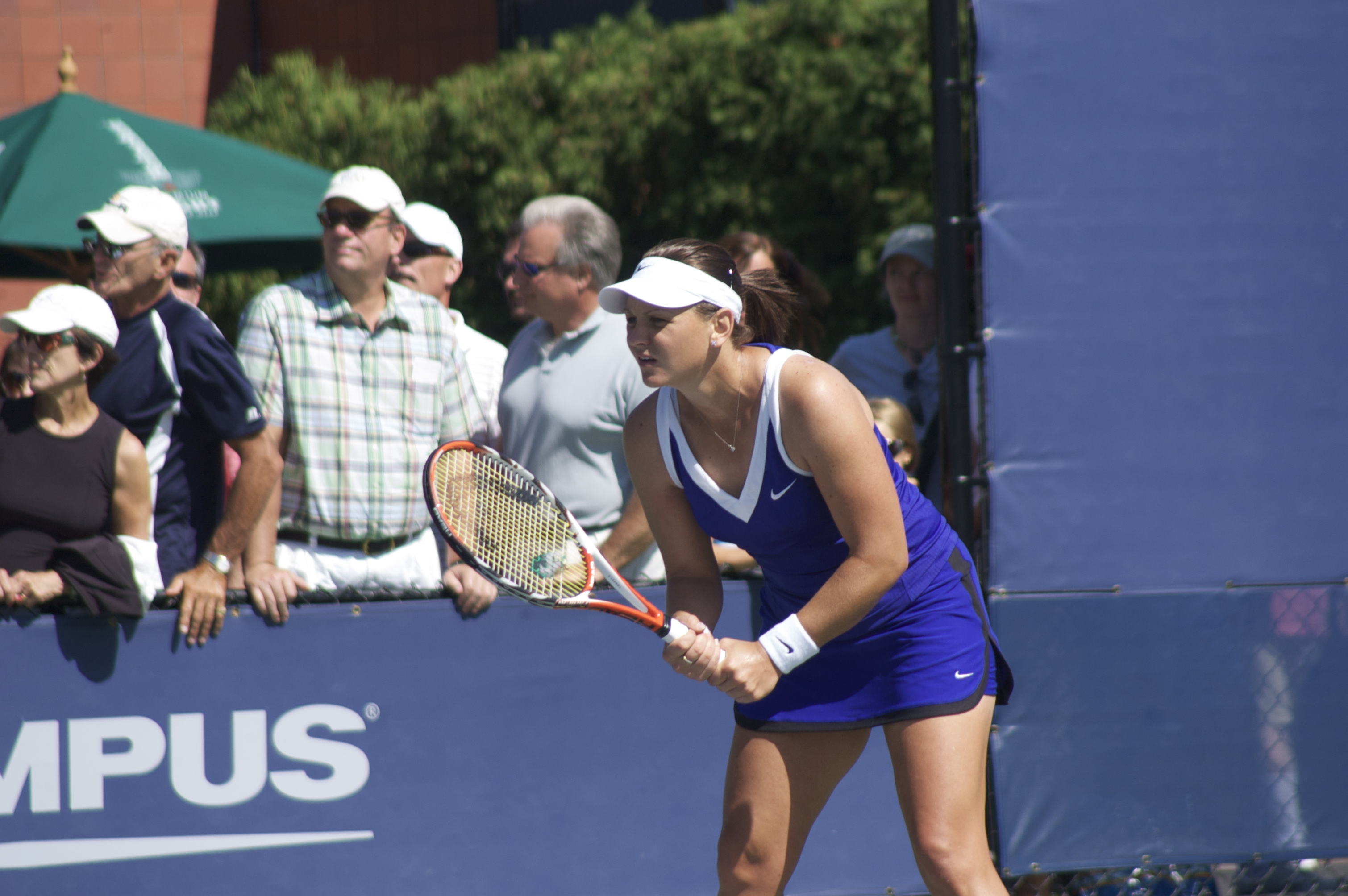
At the 2008 US Open

Dellacqua had a bad start at the US Open after losing both of her first-round matches in singles and women's doubles. In the singles, she was beaten by French qualifier Julie Coin in two tiebreaks. In the doubles event, Dellacqua entered the competition seeded ninth with Nathalie Dechy, one of the defending champions of the event. They lost to Klaudia Jans and Alicja Rosolska, in three sets. In the mixed-doubles event, she played alongside fellow Australian Jordan Kerr. They lost in the second round against Jonas Björkman and Nadia Petrova.

=== 2009: Injury troubles ===
Casey Dellacqua started her year in a disappointing performance at the Hopman Cup. Representing Australia alongside Lleyton Hewitt, she only won one of her matches, defeating American Meghann Shaughnessy.

She then participated at the Sydney International, where she lost her first-round singles match against Sara Errani. She found better success in the doubles event, where she partnered with Nathalie Dechy, who she had played with in previous doubles matches last year. They had not lost a set coming into the semifinals, where they beat the third seeds Květa Peschke and Lisa Raymond. They then reached the finals, winning against the world No. 1's and top seeds, Cara Black and Liezel Huber. However, Dellacqua and Dechy lost to Peng Shuai and Hsieh Su-wei.

In the first round of the Australian Open, Dellacqua lost to 19th-seeded Daniela Hantuchová in straight sets. She was singled out for criticism by Australian coach Roger Rasheed for carrying excess weight and not being in match condition. She found better success in the doubles event, partnering with Francesca Schiavone with whom she reached the finals at last year's French Open. Coming to the event seeded they won their first-round match against Petra Cetkovská and Carla Suárez Navarro. They then beat Alla Kudryavtseva and Ekaterina Makarova. They had a walkover in their third round match against Maria Kirilenko and Flavia Pennetta. In the quarterfinal, Dellacqua and Schiavone managed to win after having a bad first set against Patty Schnyder and Anna-Lena Grönefeld. They lost their semifinal against Venus and Serena Williams in just 58 minutes. Reaching the semifinal was the furthest Dellacqua has gone at the Australian Open. After the first Grand Slam tournament of the year, Dellacqua and coach Nicole Pratt decided to go separate ways.

Dellaqua underwent shoulder surgery in February 2009 and was off the court until mid-2009. On her website, Casey stated that the surgery and rehab went really well. She had stated in an interview that she would return to the WTA Tour at the start of the 2010 season. In December 2009, Dellacqua competed in the Australian Open Wildcard Playoff and won a wildcard entry into the main draw. She went undefeated in the round-robin stage of the tournament, and in the elimination rounds. In the quarterfinals she played second-seeded Queenslander Shannon Golds, scraping through in three sets. In the semifinals, she faced sixth seed Sally Peers, winning in straight sets. She overcame Olivia Rogowska in the final, saving three match points and eventually coming back to win in three sets.

=== 2010: Second surgery ===
Dellacqua received a wildcard into the Brisbane International, but lost in the first round to Sesil Karatantcheva. She also received a wildcard to the Sydney International, but again lost in the first round, to Vera Dushevina.

In the first round of the Australian Open, she defeated Anastasiya Yakimova. She faced a tougher opponent in her second round match against Karolina Šprem, but eventually won through in two tiebreaks. She was eliminated in two sets in the third round by sixth seed Venus Williams.

After representing Australia at the Federation Cup with Samantha Stosur, Alicia Molik and Rennae Stubbs, Dellacqua entered a $25k tournament in Mildura, which she won in both singles and doubles (with compatriot Jessica Moore). Her next tournament was a $25k tournament in Sydney. She was defeated in the second round in singles, but won the doubles title with Jessica Moore.

Dellacqua's next tournament was Wimbledon, where she used her protected ranking to gain direct entry into the main draw. She was beaten in the opening round by Bojana Jovanovski.

Dellacqua took the rest of the tour-year off and missed the 2011 Australian Open due to another surgery.

=== 2011: French Open mixed doubles title ===
Dellacqua came into 2011 having not played since the 2010 Wimbledon Championships because of injury. Her first tournament back from injury was the doubles at the $25k Burnie tournament, partnering Isabella Holland. The pair reached the second round. Dellacqua then played another four $25k tournaments in Australia, playing singles in the last three. In her first singles match back from injury in Mildura, she was beaten by compatriot and doubles partner Olivia Rogowska. Dellacqua again losing first round the next week to Sacha Jones in Ipswich, Queensland. In her final of the five straight $25k Australian tournaments, although having a bad start, Dellacqua defeated country woman Viktorija Rajicic. This was her first singles win in over a year. Dellacqua grew a lot confidence from this win and went on to win the tournament defeating doubles partner Olivia Rogowska in the final in straight sets. Dellacqua had major success in the doubles in these tournaments. Her and partner Olivia Rogowska went on a 16-match winning streak and won four straight tournaments.

Her next tournament was her first WTA Tour main draw since the 2010 Wimbledon, in Estoril as a player under protected ranking. Her first round opponent was Zhang Shuai, whom she defeated in two sets. This was her first WTA main-draw match win since the 2010 Australian Open. Dellacqua lost to fellow Australian Jarmila Gajdošová in the second round. Dellacqua lost in the first round of qualifying for the Madrid Open to Anastasia Rodionova. Retired Australian Doubles great Rennae Stubbs came out of retirement to help former top-10 doubles player Dellacqua on her comeback from injury and played with her in numerous tournament up until the US Open. Their first tournament together was in the Madrid Open. They reached the semifinals defeating fourth seeds Lisa Raymond and Liezel Huber in straight sets along the way. This result put Dellacqua back in the top 120 doubles players.

After failing to qualify in the Rome Masters, and Dellacqua and Stubbs unable to pack up their good doubles form from Madrid, her next tournament was the 2011 Brussels Open. In this tournament, Dellacqua used her protected ranking to avoid qualifying for a spot in the main draw. This move paid off as Dellacqua caused a big upset to world No. 20 and fifth seed Shahar Pe'er in the first round. This was Dellacqua's sixth victory against a top-20 player in her career. Dellacqua lost in the second round in three sets to Ayumi Morita.

Dellacqua received a wildcard into Roland Garros. She lost in the first round to 32nd seed Tsvetana Pironkova. In women's doubles, Dellacqua partnered with Australian Rennae Stubbs and reached the third round, where they lost to fourth seeds, Liezel Huber and Stubbs's last year doubles partner Lisa Raymond. This result put Dellacqua back in the world's top 100 doubles player. Dellacqua partnered with American Scott Lipsky for the 2011 French Open Mixed Doubles Championship. They had a great tournament and caused a major upset, winning the championship by defeating defending champions Katarina Srebotnik and Nenad Zimonjić in a super tiebreak, despite being unseeded. The winners split a check of $145,000. This was Dellacqua's second time in a major final, but her first win in a major (singles or doubles).

Dellacqua reached the second round of a Wimbledon warm-up tournament at the Birmingham Classic. She lost in the first round of qualifying in singles and the main draw first round doubles at the Wimbledon Championships. To warm up for the US Open, Dellacqua played a $100k tournament in the Bronx. She qualified and made the second round losing in three sets. In her final two tournaments before the US Open, she both times lost in the second round of qualifying. Dellacqua received a wildcard into the US Open and even though receiving a good draw avoiding a seed, she lost in the first round to Alizé Cornet.

Dellacqua returned to Australia to play six straight $25k tournaments to end her year. Dellacqua went on a giant run winning all six events, losing just three sets in 30 matches. These wins gained her entry back into the world's top 150. She played doubles in three of these tournaments with Olivia Rogowska. Although they suffered a shock semifinal loss in their first tournament, they went on to win the next two tournaments. That meant that Dellacqua and Rogowska won six $25k tournaments together in 2011. Dellacqua's final tournament of the year was the Australian Open Wildcard Playoff where Casey was the hot favourite to win after her 30-match winning streak. Dellacqua was stunned in her first round-robin match by then 15-year-old Ashleigh Barty in straight sets. Barty went on a giant killing run to win the tournament. Dellacqua did recover from the first loss and won her next two round-robin matches comfortably but was unable to reach the semifinals because of the first loss. Dellacqua was rewarded from her good year though and was given a direct entry wildcard into the tournament. Dellacqua finished 2011 ranked No. 156 in singles and 56 in doubles.

=== 2012: Return to top 100 ===
Dellacqua had a better year in 2012, she played in the main draw of every Grand Slam event, consistently represented Australia in Fed Cup, went to the Olympics and reached her first WTA semifinal.

Dellacqua started her year at the Brisbane International losing in the first round. She partnered with Ashleigh Barty in the doubles event. They knocked out the top seeds in the first round and eventually made the semifinals. She then played at Hobart and reached the second round. At the Australian Open, she played singles, doubles and the mixed with Chanelle Scheepers and Matthew Ebden, respectively. In the singles, she defeated Bojana Jovanovski in the first round, after losing to her two weeks prior in Brisbane. She then faced eventual champion Victoria Azarenka in her second-round match and fell in straight sets. She lost in the first round of the women's doubles and second round of the mixed doubles. Dellacqua and Jelena Dokić won their doubles tie in the Fed Cup against Switzerland.

In her next tournament, Dellacqua was only a matter of points away from defeating top 30 player Maria Kirilenko in a WTA event in Thailand. She eventually lost in three sets. Dellacqua then played two Premier tournaments in the Middle East. A qualifying loss in Dubai and making the second round in Doha. Dellacqua lost in the doubles first rounds in both these tournaments with Samantha Stosur. Dellacqua then headed to Kuala Lumpur and crushed Bojana Jovanovski. Dellacqua had a disappointing second-round loss to Hsieh Su-wei. Dellacqua made the semifinal of the doubles with Jarmila Gajdošová. Dellacqua then qualified for Indian Wells Open but lost in the first round. Dellacqua and doubles partner Samantha Stosur made the quarterfinals going down in a close three-set match.

After heading to Germany to play Fed Cup which Australia was successful getting back into the world group, Dellacqua headed to Japan to play two $50k events. The first she was a shock exit in the second round on a hardcourt. The second, which was on a grass court, was a lot better for Dellacqua who went on to win the tournament. The Western Australian tweeted that it was tennis great Roger Federer who inspired her throughout her time in Fukuoka, the reason she altered her racquet string configuration during the week. The win in Fukuoka meant Dellacqua would rise into the WTA top 100 singles rankings for the first time since 2009. She then played her final French Open warm-up tournament at a $100k tournament in Prague. This was her first tournament on clay this year. Although the Fed Cup ties were on clay. Dellacqua had a good first round match but lost in the second round. She did make the doubles final with Akgul Amanmuradova though. They went down to Alizé Cornet and Virginie Razzano. A week before the French Open, she played doubles with Anastasia Rodionova in Belgium and made the semifinals. At the French Open, she only entered in the singles and the doubles in which she partnered Russia's Alexandra Panova. Despite being the defending champion in the mixed, she did not gain entry, though her partner Scott Lipsky did participate partnering Vladimíra Uhlířová. In the singles, she drew 21st seed and eventual finalist Sara Errani in the first round. After taking the first set, she succumbed in three tight sets. She reached the second round in the doubles, before losing to compatriots and 14th seeds, Jarmila Gajdošová and Anastasia Rodionova, in three sets.

Dellacqua had a disappointing result at a $75k in Nottingham, although winning the doubles event with Eleni Daniilidou. Dellacqua then made the third round of a WTA event in Birmingham but had to withdraw from the third round after falling ill. At the Wimbledon Championships she participated in the singles and the doubles. In the first round, she drew another seed in the ninth seed Marion Bartoli, she fell in two sets. In women's doubles, she partnered Samantha Stosur in what would be a slight rehearsal for the Olympic Games. They reached the second round, before falling to the top-seeded Huber and Raymond, in three tight sets.

A month later, Dellacqua returned to London and SW19 for the 2012 Summer Olympics. She was only entered in the women's doubles alongside Samantha Stosur, they lost to the eighth seeds Nuria Llagostera Vives and María José Martínez Sánchez in the first round. Dellacqua stated that the Olympics was the highlight of her year, despite playing just the one match.

Dellacqua started her U.S. hardcourt season at a $50k tournament in the Bronx and lost in three sets in the second round. She then headed to Cincinnati to play the Western & Southern Open. Dellacqua beat two tall left handers in straight sets to qualify for the main draw but had a loss to fellow qualifier Johanna Larsson. Dellacqua's hardcourt season got a lot better the next week in Dallas where she qualified and made the semifinals. Along the way defeating fourth seed and top-30 player Yanina Wickmayer. She almost caused another major upset in the semifinal against second seed Jelena Janković but went down in two sets. This was Dellacqua's first WTA main-draw semifinal. The result also got Dellacqua back in the world's top 65. Taking loads of confidence into the US Open where she received a wild card in the main draw. However, she removed from the wildcard list after one of several players withdrew and was promoted to the last entry in the main draw as the fifth and final alternate in the tournament. She cruised past qualifier Lesia Tsurenko. Dellacqua's draw got a lot tougher though in the second round, drawing the No. 9 seed Li Na, who had won the big warm-up tournament in Cincinnati and also the 2011 French Open. Dellacqua played some of her best tennis but went down in two sets. In the doubles event, Dellacqua and partner Eleni Daniilidou almost took down top seeds Huber and Raymond but finally going down in three sets.

Dellacqua struggled through her Asian swing making qualifying exits in China, Japan and again in China. It got slightly better making the second round of a tournament in Osaka after the high ranking meaning she did not have to qualify. She finished her year at a $75k event in Japan, where she lost in the quarterfinal in three sets. She went on to win the doubles event with country woman Ashleigh Barty. They did not drop a set all tournament and won the final in straight sets. She finished 2012 ranked 88 in singles and 67 in doubles. With her singles ranking being well inside the top 100, it meant for the first time since 2008 Dellacqua would not have to play the Australian Open wildcard playoff.

=== 2013: Doubles success ===
Dellacqua was scheduled to play at the Hopman Cup but had to withdraw due to an injury. Ashleigh Barty took her place. She was awarded a wildcard into the Sydney International but had a first-round loss to Kimiko Date-Krumm. Dellacqua was given a tricky draw at the Australian Open where she had to play young American Madison Keys who was bringing form and confidence into the match. Dellacqua fought hard but went down in two sets. The doubles, however, was a different story. Dellacqua partnered fellow Australian Ashleigh Barty who was only 16 years old. They opened the tournament by cruising past Francesca Schiavone and Polona Hercog. They stunned the third-seeded team of Maria Kirilenko and Lisa Raymond and then 14th-seeded team of Natalie Grandin and Vladimíra Uhlířová to reach the quarterfinals. The duo then reached the semifinal by defeating Anastasia Pavlyuchenkova and Lucie Šafářová. Their semifinal was played on Rod Laver Arena and Dellacqua and Barty reached the final by defeating Zheng Saisai and Varvara Lepchenko becoming the first Australian duo to reach the women's doubles final of the Australian open since 1977. Despite their best efforts they were defeated by top-seeds Errani and Vinci in the final. They dropped the opening set in just 29 minutes, but gained composure in the second. In the final set, the Italians won the match and took home the title after being defeated the previous year.

Dellacqua then headed to Thailand to play the Pattaya Open where she was a direct entry into the main draw. She played Luksika Kumkhum in the first round where she was defeated. She also played doubles with Kimiko Date-Krumm, finally winning her first WTA level doubles title. Dellacqua then travelled to the Czech Republic to play in the Fed Cup World Group, where Australia was defeated 4–0 by the Czech Republic. Casey participated in the doubles alongside Ashleigh Barty, they were defeated by Czech pair Hlaváčková and Hradecká. After taking a two-week break, she then played at the Malaysian Open. She lost in the opening round to eventual champion Karolína Plíšková. She did not participate in the doubles.

Dellacqua then competed at the Indian Wells Open where she breezed through qualifying defeating Marta Sirotkina and Nastassja Burnett. Although in the first round, she was defeated convincingly by Anabel Medina Garrigues. In the doubles, she partnered Date-Krumm once again, having just previously won in Thailand. They reached the semifinals but were defeated by the fourth seeds Ekaterina Makarova and Elena Vesnina in a tight three-set match. After Indian Wells, she competed in the Miami Open and drew third seed Lauren Davis in the opening round of qualifying. Despite leading 6–1, 3–1 she was defeated in three sets. In the doubles, she again partnered Kimiko Date-Krumm; they were given a tough draw against the top-seeds Errani and Vinci in the opening round. They put up a good fight, but succumbed in a third set tiebreak.

Dellacqua took some time off in April. She travelled to Switzerland for Fed Cup but did not participate because it was a dead rubber. She played two ITFs also, losing the second and first rounds, respectively. She then travelled to Paris for the French Open. In the women's singles draw she need to gain entry through the qualifying draw. She won her first match against Ana Vrljić but lost to 21st seed Irina Falconi in a tough three-set match. In the women's doubles she again played alongside Barty; they were seeded 14th. However, they lost in the opening round in three sets. In the mixed doubles, she partnered defending champion Mahesh Bhupathi. They also lost in the first round.

Dellacqua then headed to the Birmingham Classic and the start of her grass-court season. She gained entry to the main draw via the qualifying draw. She was seeded 11th and defeated Vera Dushevina and Caroline Garcia in straight sets. She drew Daniela Hantuchová in the opening round and lost in straight sets. In the doubles, she partnered Barty once again, seeded third, and were the eventual champions. This was Dellacqua's second WTA doubles title and Barty's first. Casey then travelled to Wimbledon for the Championships. In the ladies' singles qualifying rounds, despite defeating the top seed Paula Ormaechea in the second round, she lost in the final round to Carina Witthöft. She was seeded 12th in the doubles, alongside Ashleigh Barty, and made it to the final, losing in two sets. In the mixed doubles, she partnered Scott Lipsky with whom she won the 2011 French Open mixed title. They were seeded 13th and lost in the third round.

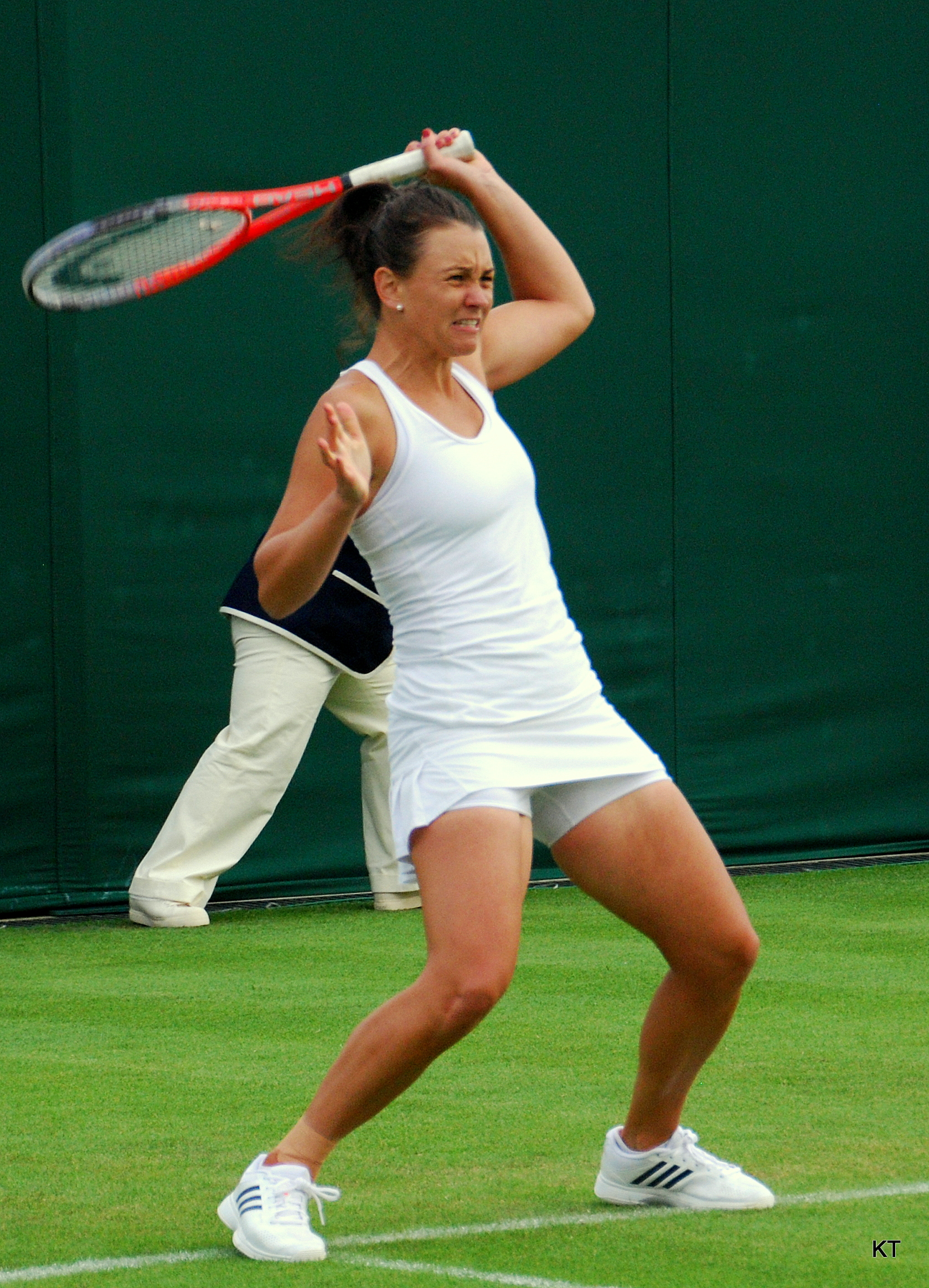
Casey Dellacqua at Wimbledon, 2013

After Wimbledon, Dellacqua headed home to Australia to train and spend time with her family in preparation for the US Open. At the US Open she entered in the singles, doubles and mixed doubles. In the women's singles, Casey had to first go through the qualifying draw to reach the final. She defeated Hsu, Feuerstein and Pervak all in straight sets to reach the main draw where she was defeated by fellow qualifier Ajla Tomljanović in three tight sets of the opening round. After this, she had the women's doubles and mixed doubles. She partnered Ashleigh Barty and Scott Lipsky, respectively. Dellacqua and Lipsky lost in the opening round of the mixed doubles. However, seeded 8th Barty and Dellacqua had a bit more luck. Breezing through to the quarterfinals, along the way defeating Cîrstea & Wickmayer, Cetkovská & Flipkens and ninth seeds Huber & Llagostera Vives. Then they defeated the second-seeded pairing of Ekaterina Makarova & Elena Vesnina, in straight sets. They continued on in the semifinals and defeated tenth seeds Sania Mirza & Zheng Jie, in straight sets. Taking Barty & Dellacqua to their second consecutive and third of the season major final. They would meet Grand Slam champions Andrea Hlaváčková & Lucie Hradecká. They lost in three tight sets, despite a strong opening set. This meant, Casey had now reached at least the final of each Grand Slam tournament. It was at the 2013 US Open, Dellacqua announced the birth of her son Blake with her partner Amanda.

Dellacqua took two weeks off, before heading to Tokyo to participate in a WTA Premier-5 level event. In the singles, she gained entry through the qualifying draw and in the main draw she lost to 16th-seed Dominika Cibulková. She also participated in the doubles alongside Barty once again, hoping to gain enough points to reach the Tour Championships. They were seeded second and lost in the opening round. She then travelled to Beijing to in the Premier Mandatory event. She only participated in the doubles with Barty. They were seeded third and lost in the second round. This meant that Barty & Dellacqua were no longer within reach of qualifying for the WTA Finals.

In late October, Casey competed in the $50k back-to-back tournaments in Bendigo, Victoria. She had a successful two weeks, winning both singles tournaments back to back, defeating Noppawan Lertcheewakarn & Tammi Patterson, respectively. Dellacqua finished the year ranked No. 131 in singles and 10 in doubles. Casey alongside Barty was nominated for the Newcombe Medal, a prestigious Australian Tennis Award, awarded to the most successful Australian tennis player of the year. They lost out to Lleyton Hewitt. Casey finished the year at the 2013 December showdown (2014 Australian Open Wildcard Playoff). As the top seed, she went on to win the tournament, defeating Maddison Inglis, Monique Adamczak, Tammi Patterson & Arina Rodionova along the way. Earning herself a ticket to the main draw of the 2014 Australian Open.

=== 2014: Career-high singles ranking and continued doubles success ===
Dellacqua began her 2014 season at the Brisbane International where she was awarded a wildcard into the singles main draw. She defeated Galina Voskoboeva in the opening round in three sets before losing to world No. 2, Victoria Azarenka, in straight sets. Dellacqua alongside Barty were seeded third in the women's doubles. After winning their first round over Varvara Lepchenko and Raluca Olaru, they had to withdraw in the quarterfinals due to Barty's left adductor injury. Dellacqua then headed to Tasmania for the Hobart International. Dellacqua defeated qualifier Alison Van Uytvanck in the opening round in straight sets, but lost in the second round to Alison Riske in three sets.

At the Australian Open, Dellacqua entered the women's singles draw as a wildcard after winning the Australian Open Wildcard playoff. Dellacua defeated former world No. 2, Vera Zvonareva and 18th seed Kirsten Flipkens to reach the third round of a Grand Slam tournament for the first time since 2010, where she defeated former Australian Open semifinalist Zheng Jie to reach the fourth round where she lost to 30th seed Eugenie Bouchard in three sets. In the women's doubles, Dellacqua and Barty competed as the fifth seeds but lost in the second round to Tímea Babos and Petra Martić. In the mixed doubles, Dellacqua partnered Ross Hutchins of Great Britain. They were defeated by the fourth-seeded team of Andrea Hlaváčková and Max Mirnyi in the opening round. After the tournament, Dellacqua rose to world No. 80 in singles, but dropped to No. 15 in doubles.

Delacqua remained on Australian soil, to participate in Australia's 2014 Fed Cup World Group tie against Russia in Hobart. In the opening rubber, Dellacqua defeated Irina Khromacheva in straight sets. After two more singles wins from Samantha Stosur, Australia advanced to the Fed Cup World Group semifinals for the first time since 1993. Dellacqua and Ashleigh Barty closed the tie by winning their doubles match in straight sets, which secured Australia a 4–0 victory over the Russians.

Dellacqua's first event outside of Australia for 2014 was the Indian Wells Open. Seeded fourth in the qualifying draw, Dellacqua defeated Anna Tatishvili and Johanna Konta to qualify for the main draw. Dellacqua then defeated Christina McHale 19th seed Kirsten Flipkens and 13th seed Roberta Vinci before receiving a walkover Lauren Davis in the fourth round. In the quarterfinals, Dellacqua lost to sixth seed Simona Halep in straight sets. This was Dellacqua's best singles performance to date. She also reached the quarterfinals of the doubles event with Barty but the pair lost in straight sets to the top seeds, Hsieh Su-wei and Peng Shuai. She was due to meet Halep again in the second round of the Miami Open, but the Romanian withdrew from the tournament due to injury; instead, Dellacqua faced lucky loser Jana Čepelová, and won in three sets, thus setting up a meeting with 29th seed and former world No. 1, Venus Williams; Dellacqua lost in three sets. In the doubles event, Dellacqua and Barty lost in the first round in three sets to Alla Kudryavtseva and Anastasia Rodionova.

Dellacqua chose not to compete in the Madrid Open and instead began her clay court season at the Internazionali BNL d'Italia in Rome. Seeded third in the qualifying draw, Dellacqua defeated Marina Shamayko and Paula Ormaechea to progress to the main draw where she overcame Magdaléna Rybáriková in three sets to reach the second round for the first time where she lost in straight sets to world No. 2, Li Na. Dellacqua also reached the quarterfinals of the doubles event with Klaudia Jans-Ignacik, defeating Katarzyna Piter/Chanelle Scheepers and Monica Niculescu/Zhang Shuai en route before losing in straight sets to Medina Garrigues and Shvedova. Dellacqua's final event prior to the French Open was the Internationaux de Strasbourg where she upset the fifth seed Elena Vesnina in the first round in three sets before losing to Christina McHale in the second round in straight sets. However, Dellacqua won the doubles event with Barty defeating Tatiana Búa and Daniela Seguel in the final in three sets, coming back from 6–4, 5–1 and three championship points down. At the French Open, Dellacqua defeated Lourdes Domínguez Lino in straight sets to reach the second round for the first time since 2008 where she lost to 23rd seed Lucie Šafářová, in three sets. She and Barty also reached the quarterfinals of the doubles event, defeating Polona Hercog/Paula Ormaechea, Jana Čepelová/Stefanie Vögele and 12th seeds Kristina Mladenovic and Flavia Pennetta en route, before losing to the second seeds and eventual finalists, Errani and Vinci, in straight sets.

Dellacqua began her grass-court season at Birmingham where she competed as the 16th seed in singles and defending champion and second seed in doubles with Ashleigh Barty. Dellacqua defeated Urszula Radwańska and Varvara Lepchenko in straight sets to reach the third round where she upset her second-seeded compatriot and former US Open champion Samantha Stosur in three sets to reach the quarterfinals where she defeated Kimiko Date-Krumm in a match lasting just 48 minutes before losing in the semifinals to eventual runner-up, Barbora Záhlavová-Strýcová. As a result of her strong singles performance, Dellacqua ascended to a new career-high singles ranking of No. 36 following the event. Dellacqua also reached the final of the doubles event, defeating Tímea Babos and Kristina Mladenovic; Liezel Huber and Lisa Raymond and Caroline Garcia and Zhang Shuai en route before losing to the third seeds, Raquel Kops-Jones and Abigail Spears in straight sets. At the Wimbledon Championships, Dellacqua defeated qualifier Anett Kontaveit in three sets after having been match point down before falling to 4th seed Agnieszka Radwańska in the second round. Seeded sixth in the women's doubles event alongside Barty, the pair defeated Eugenie Bouchard and Heather Watson; Kimiko Date-Krumm and Barbora Záhlavová-Strýcová and 12th seeds Anabel Medina Garrigues and Yaroslava Shvedova all in straight sets before losing to the second seeds and eventual champions, Sara Errani and Roberta Vinci in three sets. In the mixed doubles event, Dellacqua competed alongside Jamie Murray as the 10th seeds. After a first round bye, the pair defeated Andreja Klepač and Jesse Huta Galung and sixth seeds Sania Mirza and Horia Tecău to reach the quarterfinals where they fell to the 14th seeds and eventual finalists, Max Mirnyi and Chan Hao-ching.

Dellacqua began her North-American hardcourt season at the Rogers Cup. This was her first appearance at the Canadian Open and she made the second round. At the US Open, Dellacqua made the fourth round before losing to Flavia Pennetta, equaling her best rest at a Grand Slam. She continued her good form by reaching the quarterfinals of the Pan Pacific Open defeating an in-form Sabine Lisicki and Marina Erakovic in the first and second round respectively, before falling to Garbiñe Muguruza despite being up a set. At the Wuhan Open, Dellacqua reached the third round by defeating Vinci and Pavlyuchenkova, but ultimately lost to Caroline Wozniacki.

=== 2015: Career-high doubles ranking and injury ===
Dellacqua commenced the season at the Hopman Cup, losing all three rubbers to Agnieszka Radwańska, Alizé Cornet and Heather Watson. She then played the Hobart International where she was the top seed for the first time at a WTA Tour event. She lost in the second round. Dellacqua then played at the Australian Open as the 29th seed. She defeated Yvonne Meusburger in straight sets before losing to eventual semifinalist Madison Keys. She also played in the women's doubles as the 15th seed with Kimiko Date-Krumm. They lost in the second round. She then traveled to Stuttgart for the 2015 Fed Cup World Group where she played in the doubles, losing to the partnership of Görges/Lisicki. Dellacqua next played the Dubai Tennis Championships losing in the second round to Lucie Šafářová despite winning the first set. She then traveled to the Qatar Ladies Open where she lost in the first round to Venus Williams again after taking the first set. She next played at the Malaysian Open as the third seed but lost in the first round to eventual semifinalist Hsieh Su-wei. Dellacqua then withdrew from the Indian Wells Open where she was defending quarterfinalist points. This saw her fall down to 42nd in the WTA rankings. Despite this she was the 32nd seed at the Miami Open where she lost in the second round (after having a first round bye) to Belinda Bencic in three sets.

Dellacqua started her clay.court season at the Family Circle Cup where she again drew Bencic in the first round, she then lost in straight sets. She had better luck in the doubles partnering Darija Jurak, where they reached the final but lost to the partnership of Sania Mirza/Martina Hingis. Dellacqua then played the Premier Mandatory Madrid Open causing an upset over former French Open champion Francesca Schiavone in straight sets. She then lost to world No. 9, Agnieszka Radwańska, in straight sets. Dellacqua had better success in the doubles, partnering Yaroslava Shvedova. The pair defeated the sixth seeds Garcia/Srebotnik in straight sets and backed this up with a win over Liang/Marosi. They then defeated the fourth seeds Hsieh/Pennetta for a spot in the semifinals where they defeated the seventh seeds and reigning Australian Open champion pairing of Mattek-Sands/Šafářová. They then played in the final against third seeds, Muguruza/Suárez Navarro, and won the title in three sets. This was Dellacqua's first Premier Mandatory title and her fourth doubles title overall. Dellacqua then withdrew from the Italian Open and Strasbourg Open. She then played at the French Open singles where she lost in the first round to fellow Aussie Ajla Tomljanović. Dellacqua there partnered again with Yaroslava Shvedova, and they reached their first Grand Slam final as a team. They defeated Chan/Davis, Cornet/Linette, and eighth seeds Garcia/Srebotnik to reach the quarterfinals. They followed this up with straight sets wins over 13th seeds Krajicek//Strýcová and second seeds Makarova/Vesnina to reach the final. The pair then lost in three sets to the reigning Australian Open champions Mattek-Sands/Šafářová.

Dellacqua began her grass-court season at the Nottingham Open where she was the sixth seed. She defeated Sesil Karatantcheva in the first round, before losing to eventual champion Ana Konjuh. Her next tournament was the Premier-level Birmingham Classic where she defeated Lauren Davis in the first round. She next faced former world No. 1, Jelena Janković, and lost in straight sets. Dellacqua next played at Eastbourne where she defeated Anna Karolína Schmiedlová in the first round before losing to eighth seed Karolína Plíšková. Dellacqua then played at Wimbledon where she defeated former Wimbledon quarterfinalist Tamira Paszek in straight sets. She then caused a big upset over 17th seed and recent French Open quarterfinalist Elina Svitolina to reach the third round and equal her best Wimbledon performance. She then played former Wimbledon finalist and 13th seed Agnieszka Radwańska and despite leading 4–0 in the second set, she lost in straight sets. She also contested the women's doubles with Shvedova as the ninth seeds. They lost in the quarterfinals to Hingis/Mirza, 5–7, 3–6.

Dellacqua began her summer hardcourt season participating the qualifying event at the Rogers Cup, but fail to get to the main round. In first round, she teamed with Yaroslava Shvedova but lost to all-rising-stars pair Kristina Mladenovic and Karolína Plíšková. Her next event was Cincinnati Open. She qualified to the main round, but lost to Mona Barthel in the first round. In doubles event, she and Shvedova reached the final, where they lost to the sisters pair Chan Hao-ching and Chan Yung-jan. At the Connecticut Open, she and Shvedova lost in the quarterfinals. At the US Open, she lost in the first round to qualifier Anett Kontaveit in the singles competition. However, she teamed with Yaroslava Shvedova to reach their second Grand Slam final of the year in the doubles competition. Once again, they finished runner-up, this time to top-seeded pair Mirza/Hingis, which means Dellacqua's Grand Slam final record in women's doubles event fell to 0–6.

In October, Dellacqua was in the women's doubles semifinal of the China Open when she fell and hit her head on the cement. This forced Dellacqua and Shvedova to withdraw from the 2015 WTA Finals.

=== 2016: Limited play ===
Still suffering the effects of the fall at the 2015 China Open, Dellacqua withdrew from the Australian summer. In February, Dellacqua travelled to Bratislava to play Fed Cup and partnered Samantha Stosur to win the deciding rubber against Slovakia. In March, Dellacqua was given a wildcard into the San Antonio Open. This was her first singles match in five months, and she lost 1–6, 0–6 to Tsvetana Pironkova. While she wanted to play Indian Wells and Miami, she realised she was not "physically and mentally 100%" so decided to take more time off and get it right. She did not play again in 2016.

=== 2017: Doubles return ===
Dellacqua's comeback commenced at the Brisbane International where she was given a wildcard into the women's doubles with Ashleigh Barty. The pair lost in the first round, 17–19 in the match tie-break to Srebotnik/Spears. Dellacqua and Barty were given wildcards into the Australian Open. Together, they reached the quarterfinals of the Australian Open for the second time, after wins over Kichenok/Kichenok, Hingis/Vandeweghe and Grönefeld/Peschke.

== Career statistics ==
=== Grand Slam tournament finals ===
==== Doubles: 7 (7 runner-ups) ====
Result	Year	Championship	Surface	Partner	Opponents	Score
Loss	2008	French Open	Clay	(Italy) Francesca Schiavone	(Spain) Anabel Medina Garrigues (Spain) Virginia Ruano Pascual	6–2, 5–7, 4–6
Loss	2013	Australian Open	Hard	(Australia) Ashleigh Barty	(Italy) Sara Errani (Italy) Roberta Vinci	2–6, 6–3, 2–6
Loss	2013	Wimbledon	Grass	(Australia) Ashleigh Barty	(Chinese Taipei) Hsieh Su-wei (China) Peng Shuai	6–7^{(1–7)}, 1–6
Loss	2013	US Open	Hard	(Australia) Ashleigh Barty	(Czech Republic) Andrea Hlaváčková (Czech Republic) Lucie Hradecká	7–6^{(7–4)}, 1–6, 4–6
Loss	2015	French Open (2)	Clay	(Kazakhstan) Yaroslava Shvedova	(United States) Bethanie Mattek-Sands (Czech Republic) Lucie Šafářová	6–3, 4–6, 2–6
Loss	2015	US Open (2)	Hard	(Kazakhstan) Yaroslava Shvedova	(Switzerland) Martina Hingis (India) Sania Mirza	3–6, 3–6
Loss	2017	French Open (3)	Clay	(Australia) Ashleigh Barty	(United States) Bethanie Mattek-Sands (Czech Republic) Lucie Šafářová	2–6, 1–6

==== Mixed doubles: 1 (title) ====
Result	Year	Championship	Surface	Partner	Opponents	Score
Win	2011	French Open	Clay	(United States) Scott Lipsky	(Slovenia) Katarina Srebotnik (Serbia) Nenad Zimonjić	7–6^{(8–6)}, 4–6, [10–7]

=== Grand Slam performance timelines ===
Key
W	F	SF	QF	#R	RR	Q#	DNQ	A	NH

(W) winner; (F) finalist; (SF) semifinalist; (QF) quarterfinalist; (#R) rounds 4, 3, 2, 1; (RR) round-robin stage; (Q#) qualification round; (DNQ) did not qualify; (A) absent; (NH) not held; (SR) strike rate (events won / competed); (W–L) win–loss record.

==== Doubles ====
Tournament	2003	2004	2005	2006	2007	2008	2009	2010	2011	2012	2013	2014	2015	2016	2017	2018	W–L
Australian Open	2R	2R	1R	2R	1R	1R	SF	1R	A	1R	F	2R	2R	A	QF	2R	17–14
French Open	A	A	A	A	A	F	A	A	3R	2R	1R	QF	F	A	F	A	21–7
Wimbledon	A	A	A	A	A	SF	A	1R	1R	2R	F	QF	QF	A	QF	A	19–8
US Open	A	1R	A	A	2R	1R	A	A	1R	1R	F	1R	F	A	2R	A	12–9
Win–loss	1–1	1–2	0–1	1–1	1–2	9–4	3–1	0–2	2–3	2–4	15–4	7–4	14–4	0–0	12–4	1–1	69–38

==== Mixed doubles ====
Tournament	2003	2004	2005	2006	2007	2008	2009	2010	2011	2012	2013	2014	2015	2016	2017	2018	W–L
Australian Open	A	1R	A	1R	2R	A	A	1R	A	2R	1R	1R	QF	A	2R	2R	6–10
French Open	A	A	A	A	A	A	A	A	W	A	1R	1R	A	A	SF	A	8–3
Wimbledon	A	A	A	A	A	3R	A	A	2R	A	3R	QF	2R	A	2R	A	7–6
US Open	A	A	A	A	A	2R	A	A	A	A	1R	2R	A	A	1R	A	2–4
Win–loss	0–0	0–1	0–0	0–1	1–1	3–2	0–0	0–1	6–1	1–1	1–4	3–4	3–2	0–0	4–4	1–1	23–23
