= Magdaléna Rybáriková =

Slovak tennis player (born 1988)

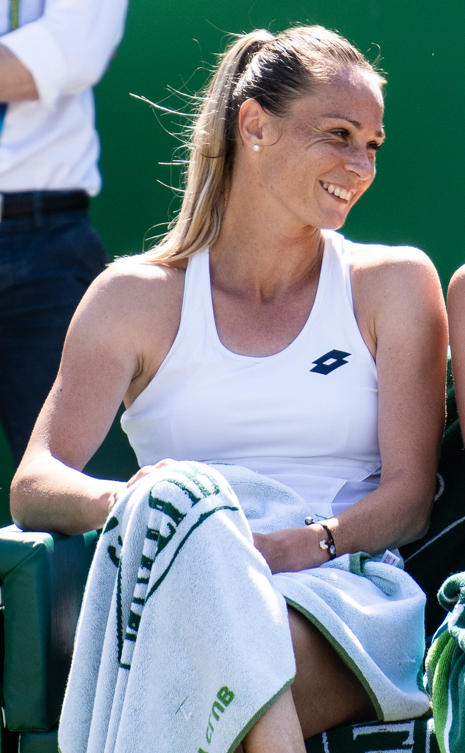
- Rybáriková at the 2018 Birmingham Classic
- Country (sports): Slovakia
- Residence: Bratislava, Slovakia
- Born: 4 October 1988 (age 38) Piešťany, Czechoslovakia (now Slovakia)
- Height: 1.80 m (5 ft 11 in)
- Turned pro: 2005
- Retired: 2020
- Plays: Right-handed (two-handed backhand)
- Coach: Peter Huber
- Prize money: US$5,252,043

Singles
- Career record: 426–307
- Career titles: 4
- Highest ranking: No. 17 (5 March 2018)

Grand Slam singles results
- Australian Open: 4R (2018)
- French Open: 3R (2018)
- Wimbledon: SF (2017)
- US Open: 3R (2008, 2009, 2017)

Doubles
- Career record: 65–70
- Career titles: 1
- Highest ranking: No. 50 (6 June 2011)

Grand Slam doubles results
- Australian Open: 3R (2011)
- French Open: 3R (2014)
- Wimbledon: SF (2014)
- US Open: 3R (2010)

Team competitions
- Fed Cup: SF (2013), record 15–11

Magdaléna Rybáriková (Slovak pronunciation: [ˈmaɡdaleːna ˈribaːrikɔʋaː]; born 4 October 1988) is a Slovak former professional tennis player. In her career, she won four singles titles and one doubles title on the WTA Tour. Rybáriková reached the semifinals of the 2017 Wimbledon Championships and broke into the top 30 for the first time in September 2017, and reached a career-high singles ranking of No. 17, in March 2018.

== Early life ==
Rybáriková started tennis at the age of eight. She was born in Piešťany to father Anton, a business manager, and mother Mária. She has two older siblings, Filip and Naďa. At the age of 15, she moved to Bratislava to train at the national tennis centre. Her favourite surfaces were grass and hardcourts.

== Career summary ==
=== 2006–2009 ===
In 2006, Rybáriková reached the girls' singles final at Wimbledon. On her way there, she defeated the future top-30 ranked players Tamira Paszek and Alisa Kleybanova. In the final, she lost to the future world No. 1 Caroline Wozniacki. In the same year she won two matches at the Prague Open, reaching her first tour quarterfinal.

In 2008, she won her first $50k title and came through qualifying to reach the main draws of both Roland Garros and Wimbledon. She reached the third round of a Grand Slam championship for the first time at the US Open. In October, she reached her first WTA Tour semifinal at the Tier IV Tashkent Open.

At the 2009 Hobart International, Rybáriková defeated the top-seed Flavia Pennetta, in straight sets, in the quarterfinals for her first win over a top-15 player. A month later, at the Pattaya Open, she beat Wozniacki in the quarterfinals for her second win over a top-15 player. She won the first of her four WTA Tour singles titles at Birmingham in June, defeating Li Na, before reaching the third round of the US Open.

=== 2010–2014 ===
Rybáriková won her second WTA singles title at the 2011 Cellular South Cup and her third at the 2012 Washington Open. In June 2013, she reached the semifinals at the Birmingham Classic, before winning her fourth WTA tournament when successfully defending her title at the Washington Open, Partnering Andrea Petkovic, she reached the semifinals of the women's doubles at the 2014 Wimbledon Championships.

=== 2015 ===
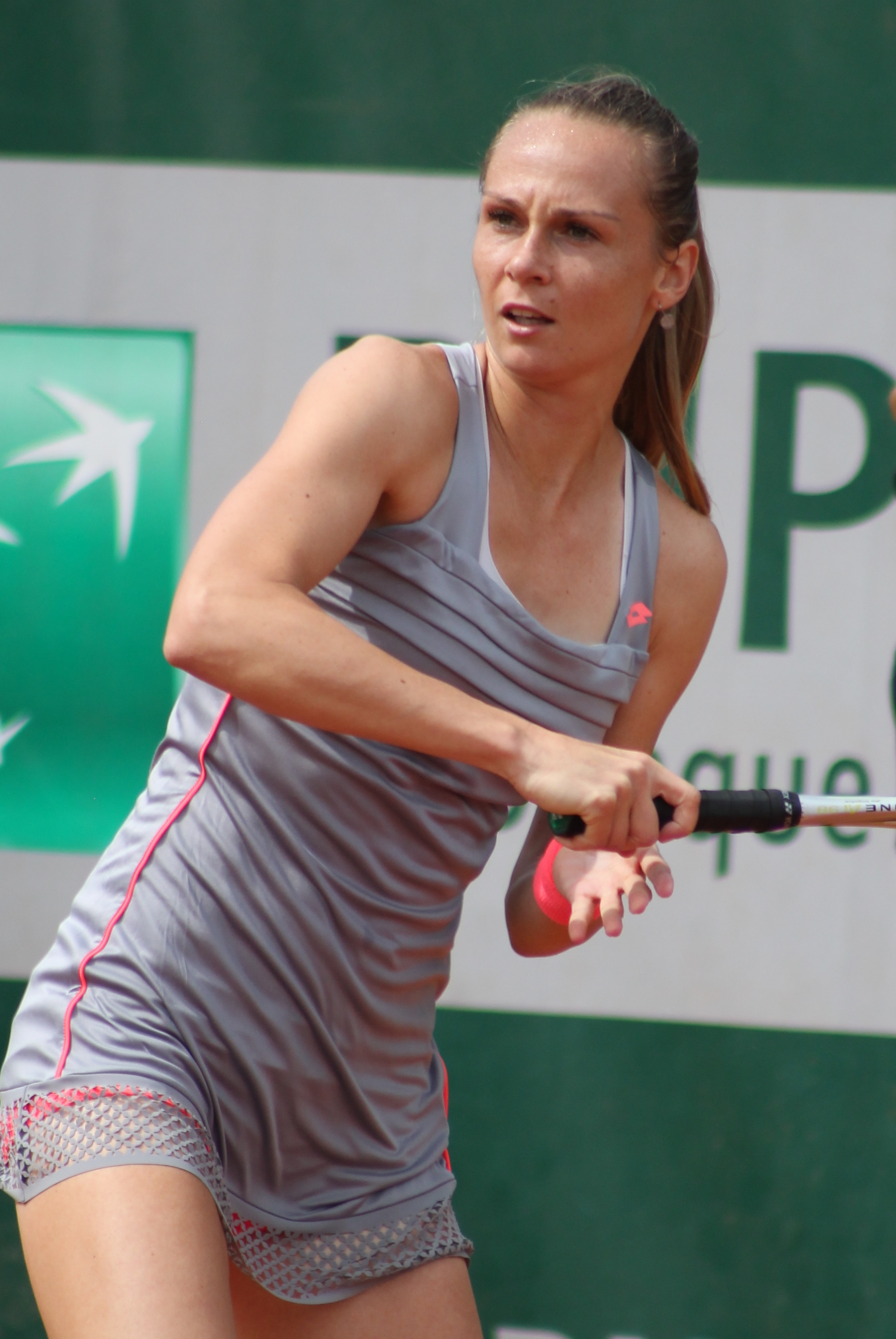
Rybáriková at the 2015 French Open

Rybáriková began her 2015 season at the Brisbane International where she lost in the first round to Elina Svitolina. In Hobart at the Hobart International, Rybáriková was defeated in the first round by eventual champion Heather Watson. At the Australian Open, Rybáriková got her first win of the season by beating Ana Konjuh in the first round; she lost in the second round to Peng Shuai.

During the Fed Cup tie versus the Netherlands, Rybáriková lost her singles matches to Arantxa Rus and Kiki Bertens. In the end, The Netherlands defeated Slovakia 4–1. At the Diamond Games, Rybáriková was defeated in the first round by Belgian wildcard Alison Van Uytvanck. In Mexico at the Abierto Mexicano, Rybáriková reached the quarterfinals where she lost to top seed Maria Sharapova. Seeded eighth at the Monterrey Open, Rybáriková reached the quarterfinal round where she retired after losing the first set to third seed Caroline Garcia. At the Indian Wells Open, Rybáriková was defeated in the first round by qualifier Lara Arruabarrena. Playing at the Miami Open, she lost in the first round to Van Uytvanck. Seeded fourth at the Katowice Open, Rybáriková was defeated again by Van Uytvanck in round one.

Rybáriková only played one clay-court warm-up tournament before the French Open. In Rome at the Italian Open, she won her first match in almost two months by defeating Italian wildcard Nastassja Burnett in the first round before she lost to 16th seed Jelena Janković. At the French Open, Rybáriková won her first-round match over qualifier Olivia Rogowska. In the second round, she was eliminated by the 28th seed Flavia Pennetta.

Rybáriková started the grass-court season at the Nottingham Open seeded seventh, losing in the first round to the British wildcard Johanna Konta. At the Birmingham Classic, she upset ninth seed Garbiñe Muguruza in the first round. She followed up her first-round win by beating Anna Karolína Schmiedlová in the second round; she was defeated in the third round by eighth seed Sabine Lisicki. At the Eastbourne International, Rybáriková managed to get into the main draw after winning two matches in qualifying. However, she lost in the first round to Svetlana Kuznetsova. At the Wimbledon Championships, Rybáriková upset eighth seed Ekaterina Makarova in her second-round match. In round three, she was defeated by qualifier Olga Govortsova.

Competing at the İstanbul Cup, Rybáriková reached the semifinals and lost to Urszula Radwańska.

She began her US Open Series at the Washington Open where she was defeated in the opening round by eventual finalist Anastasia Pavlyuchenkova. In Toronto at the Canadian Open, she lost in the first round of qualifying to Monica Puig. At the Western & Southern Open, she was upset in the first round of qualifying by Sesil Karatantcheva.

=== 2016 ===
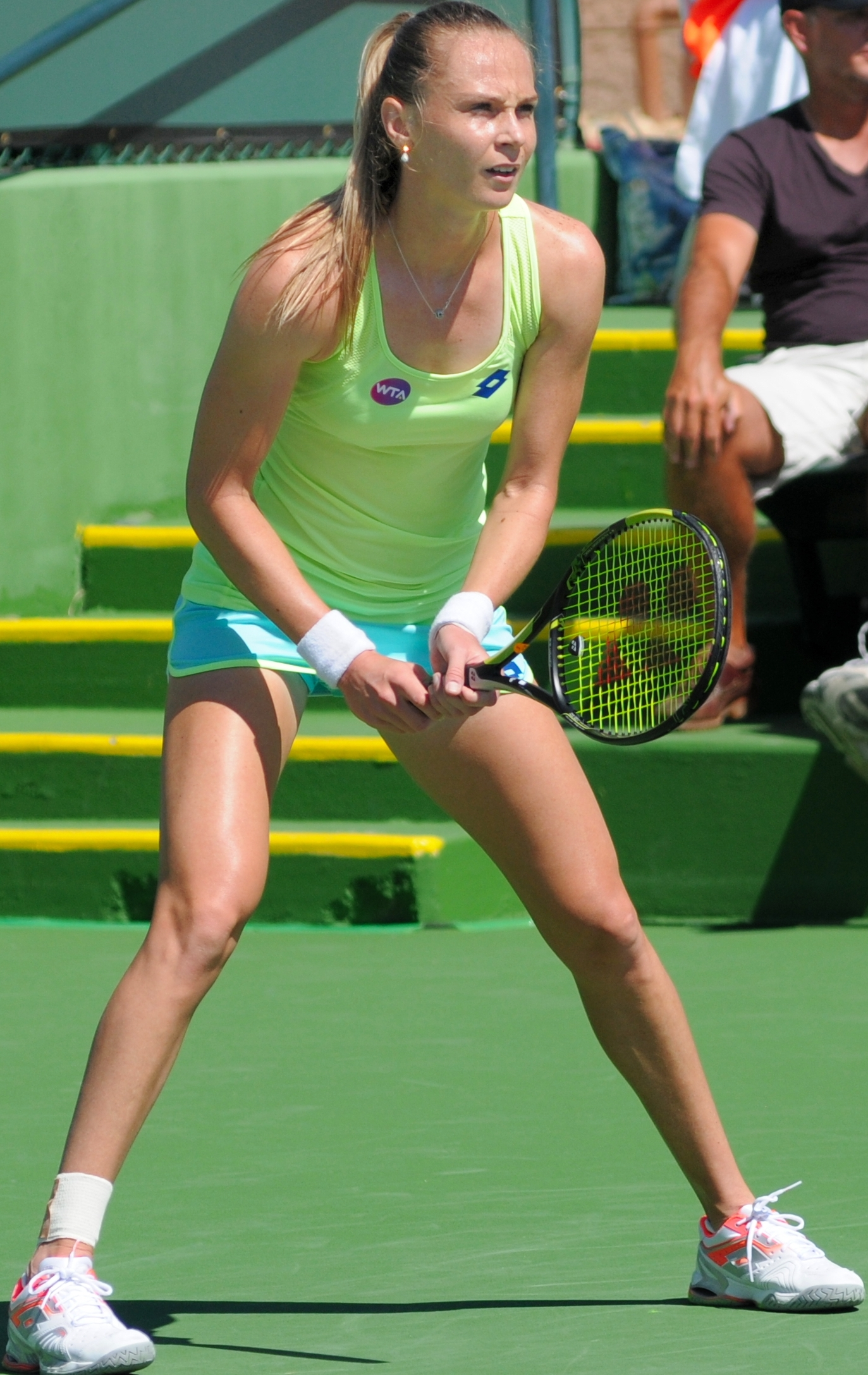
Rybáriková at the 2016 Indian Wells

Rybáriková began her season at the Auckland Open. She lost in the final round of qualifying in a close match to Naomi Broady. At the Sydney International, Rybáriková was defeated in the final round of qualifying by Lara Arruabarrena. However, due to Daria Gavrilova withdrawing from the tournament due to a left abdominal muscle injury, Rybáriková got a lucky loser spot into the main draw. In the first round, she was defeated by qualifier and eventual finalist Monica Puig. At the Australian Open, Rybáriková won her first-round match over Yanina Wickmayer. In the second round, she retired after losing the first set to Lauren Davis.

She returned in March to compete at the Monterrey Open where she lost in the first round to top seed Sara Errani. Playing at Indian Wells, Rybáriková reached the quarterfinals, after wins over Laura Robson, 31st seed Daria Gavrilova, seventh seed Belinda Bencic, and ninth seed Roberta Vinci. She suffered a leg injury in her quarterfinal match and was defeated by 13th seed and eventual champion Victoria Azarenka.

As the top seed at the Slovak Open, Rybáriková retired with a knee injury during her first-round match against her compatriot Viktória Kužmová. At the French Open, she lost in the first round to top seed and three-time champion, Serena Williams.

Rybáriková played one grass-court event before Wimbledon at the Nottingham Open where she upset sixth seed Heather Watson in the first round. She retired in her second-round match against lucky loser Tamira Paszek due to a knee injury. At Wimbledon, she was defeated in the first round by Eugenie Bouchard.

Rybáriková was absent for the rest of the year owing to wrist and knee surgeries, and ended the season ranked 156.

=== 2017 ===
Rybáriková returned to the tour after a seven-month absence in February 2017 and by March her ranking had dropped to world No. 453. She won two ITF titles in Japan in May, to improve her ranking to 188, before defeating CoCo Vandeweghe in the first round at the French Open, further improving her ranking to 117. Rybáriková went on to have an excellent grass-court season, winning 18 out of 20 matches. She won the ITF title in Surbiton, reached the semifinals at Nottingham (losing to Johanna Konta), and won another ITF title in Ilkley, to return to the world top 100 (No. 85) for the first time in over a year. The grass-court season culminated in her reaching the semifinals at the Wimbledon Championships, having never before advanced beyond the third round of any major event. Her Wimbledon run included victories over the world No. 3, Karolína Plíšková, in the second round, and the world No. 25 Vandeweghe in the quarterfinals, and ended with a loss to eventual champion Garbiñe Muguruza in the semifinals. Ranked No. 33 after Wimbledon, she broke into the top 30 for the first time in September 2017, after reaching the third round of the US Open, where she again lost to Muguruza. In November, she qualified for the Elite Trophy, and achieved a career-best year-end ranking of world No. 20.

=== 2018 ===
Rybáriková started the season at the Sydney International where she lost in the first round to qualifier CiCi Bellis. Seeded 19th at the Australian Open, she reached the fourth round in which she was defeated by second seed and eventual champion, Caroline Wozniacki.

=== 2019 ===
Rybáriková started her 2019 season at the Brisbane International where she lost in the first round to Donna Vekić. At the Australian Open, Rybáriková was defeated in the first round by eighth seed and eventual finalist, Petra Kvitová.

In March, she competed at Indian Wells and lost in the first round to Tatjana Maria. In Miami, she was defeated in the second round by 15th seed Julia Görges. Seeded eighth at the Monterrey Open, Rybáriková reached the semifinal where she lost to second seed, defending and eventual champion, Garbiñe Muguruza.

Beginning her clay-court season at the Rabat Grand Prix, Rybáriková was defeated in the first round by qualifier Ysaline Bonaventure. At the Madrid Open, she retired during her first-round qualifying match against Irina Bara. At the French Open, Rybáriková lost in the first round to Johanna Larsson.

Seeded fifth at the Surbiton Trophy, she made it to the final where she was defeated by third seed and defending champion, Alison Riske. At the Nottingham Open, she retired during her first-round match against Astra Sharma due to a respiratory infection. As the top seed at the Ilkley Trophy, Rybáriková lost in the second round to Beatriz Haddad Maia. At the Wimbledon Championships, she stunned tenth seed Aryna Sabalenka in her first-round match before she was defeated in the second round by qualifier Coco Gauff.

Playing in Canada at the Vancouver Open, Rybáriková lost in the first round to Kurumi Nara. At the US Open, she was defeated in the first round of qualifying by Han Na-lae.

Rybáriková ended the year ranked 173 and confirmed her retirement in October 2020.

== Career statistics ==
=== Grand Slam performance timelines ===
Key
W	F	SF	QF	#R	RR	Q#	P#	DNQ	A	Z#	PO	G	S	B	NMS	NTI	P	NH

(W) winner; (F) finalist; (SF) semifinalist; (QF) quarterfinalist; (#R) rounds 4, 3, 2, 1; (RR) round-robin stage; (Q#) qualification round; (P#) preliminary round; (DNQ) did not qualify; (A) absent; (Z#) Davis/Fed Cup Zonal Group (with number indication) or (PO) play-off; (G) gold, (S) silver or (B) bronze Olympic/Paralympic medal; (NMS) not a Masters tournament; (NTI) not a Tier I tournament; (P) postponed; (NH) not held; (SR) strike rate (events won / competed); (W–L) win–loss record.

==== Singles ====
Tournament	2007	2008	2009	2010	2011	2012	2013	2014	2015	2016	2017	2018	2019	SR	W–L
Australian Open	A	A	1R	1R	1R	1R	1R	2R	2R	2R	A	4R	1R	0 / 10	6–10
French Open	A	2R	2R	2R	1R	1R	2R	2R	2R	1R	2R	3R	1R	0 / 12	9–12
Wimbledon	Q1	1R	1R	1R	1R	1R	1R	1R	3R	1R	SF	1R	2R	0 / 12	7–12
US Open	A	3R	3R	1R	1R	2R	1R	1R	1R	A	3R	1R	Q1	0 / 10	7–10
Win–loss	0–0	3–3	3–4	1–4	0–4	1–4	1–4	2–4	4–4	1–3	8–3	5–4	1–3	0 / 44	30–44

==== Doubles ====
Tournament	2008	2009	2010	2011	2012	2013	2014	2015	2016	2017	2018	2019	SR	W–L
Australian Open	A	1R	1R	3R	1R	1R	2R	1R	2R	A	A	1R	0 / 9	4–9
French Open	A	1R	1R	3R	A	2R	3R	2R	1R	A	2R	2R	0 / 9	8–9
Wimbledon	A	2R	2R	A	A	2R	SF	1R	2R	A	2R	A	0 / 7	9–7
US Open	1R	2R	3R	1R	2R	2R	1R	2R	A	2R	2R	A	0 / 10	8–10
Win–loss	0–1	2–4	3–4	4–3	1–2	3–4	7–4	2–4	2–3	1–1	3–3	1–2	0 / 35	29–35
