= 1994 DFS Classic =

- Date: 6–12 June
- Edition: 13th
- Draw: 56S / 28D
- Surface: Grass / outdoor
- Location: Birmingham, United Kingdom
- Venue: Edgbaston Priory Club

Champions

Singles
- (United States) Lori McNeil

Doubles
- (United States) Zina Garrison-Jackson / (Latvia) Larisa Savchenko
← 1993 ·	Birmingham Classic	· 1995 →

The 1994 DFS Classic was a women's tennis tournament played on outdoor grass courts. It was the 13th edition of the event. It took place at the Edgbaston Priory Club in Birmingham, United Kingdom, from 6 June until 12 June 1994.

== Entrants ==
=== Seeds ===
Athlete	Nationality	Seeding
Zina Garrison-Jackson	United States	1
Lori McNeil	United States	2
Iva Majoli	Croatia	3
Nathalie Tauziat	France	4
Brenda Schultz	Netherlands	5
Patty Fendick	United States	6
Meredith McGrath	United States	7
Pam Shriver	United States	8
Larisa Savchenko	Latvia	9
Miriam Oremans	Netherlands	10
Kristine Radford	Australia	11
Rachel McQuillan	Australia	12
Elna Reinach	South Africa	13
Joannette Kruger	South Africa	14
Laura Golarsa	Italy	15
Clare Wood	Great Britain	16

=== Other entrants ===
The following players received wildcards into the main draw:

- (United Kingdom) Jo Durie
- (United Kingdom) Monique Javer
- (United Kingdom) Claire Taylor

The following players received entry from the qualifying draw:

- (France) Isabelle Demongeot
- (Australia) Kerry-Anne Guse
- (South Africa) Mareze Joubert
- (United States) Shannan McCarthy
- (Australia) Nicole Pratt
- (United Kingdom) Julie Pullin
- (United Kingdom) Shirli-Ann Siddall
- (Ukraine) Elena Tatarkova

The following player received a lucky loser spot:

- (United States) Julie Steven

== Headers ==
=== Singles ===
(United States) Lori McNeil defeated (United States) Zina Garrison-Jackson 6–2, 6–2

- It was McNeil's first title of the year and the 10th of her career.

=== Doubles ===
(United States) Zina Garrison-Jackson / (Latvia) Larisa Savchenko defeated (Australia) Catherine Barclay / (Australia) Kerry-Anne Guse 6–4, 6–4

- It was Garrison-Jackson's first doubles title of the year and the 20th of her career. It was Savchenko's fourth doubles title of the year and the 45th of her career.
