= 1993 DFS Classic =

- Date: 7–13 June
- Edition: 12th
- Category: Tier III
- Draw: 56S / 28D
- Prize money: $150,000
- Surface: Grass / outdoor
- Location: Birmingham, United Kingdom
- Venue: Edgbaston Priory Club

Champions

Singles
- (United States) Lori McNeil

Doubles
- (United States) Lori McNeil / (United States) Martina Navratilova
← 1992 ·	Birmingham Classic	· 1994 →

The 1993 DFS Classic was a women's tennis tournament played on outdoor grass courts that was part of Tier III of the 1993 WTA Tour. It was the 12th edition of the tournament and the first to be named the "DFS Classic" after the change in sponsor from the previous years. It took place at the Edgbaston Priory Club in Birmingham, United Kingdom from 7 June until 13 June 1993. Fifth-seeded Lori McNeil won the singles title.

== Finals ==
=== Singles ===
(United States) Lori McNeil defeated (United States) Zina Garrison-Jackson 6–4, 2–6, 6–3

- It was McNeil's first title of the year and the 9th of her career.

=== Doubles ===
(United States) Lori McNeil / (United States) Martina Navratilova defeated (United States) Pam Shriver / (Australia) Elizabeth Smylie 6–3, 6–4

- It was McNeil's first doubles title of the year and the 26th of her career. It was Navratilova's second doubles title of the year and the 162nd of her career.

== Entrants ==
=== Seeds ===
Athlete	Nationality	Seeding
Martina Navratilova	United States	1
Amanda Coetzer	South Africa	2
Nathalie Tauziat	France	3
Zina Garrison-Jackson	United States	4
Lori McNeil	United States	5
Patty Fendick	United States	6
Pam Shriver	United States	7
Larisa Savchenko	Soviet Union	8
Mana Endo	Japan	9
Linda Harvey-Wild	United States	10
Ginger Helgeson	United States	11
Rosalyn Nideffer	South Africa	12
Kimberly Po	United States	13
Elna Reinach	South Africa	14
Chanda Rubin	United States	15
Manon Bollegraf	Netherlands	16

=== Other entrants ===
The following players received wildcards into the main draw:

- (United Kingdom) Jo Durie
- (United Kingdom) Amanda Grunfeld
- (United Kingdom) Shirli-Ann Siddall
- (United Kingdom) Lorna Woodroffe

The following players received entry from the qualifying draw:

- (United States) Katrina Adams
- (France) Sophie Amiach
- (United States) Ann Henricksson
- (United States) Cammy MacGregor
- (United States) Shannan McCarthy
- (United States) Tammy Whittington

The following player received a lucky loser spot:

- (Sweden) Maria Strandlund
