= 2007 DFS Classic =

- Date: 11–17 June
- Edition: 26th
- Category: Tier III
- Surface: Grass / outdoor
- Location: Birmingham, United Kingdom
- Venue: Edgbaston Priory Club

Champions

Singles
- (Serbia) Jelena Janković

Doubles
- (Chinese Taipei) Yung-jan Chan / (Chinese Taipei) Chia-jung Chuang
← 2006 ·	Birmingham Classic	· 2008 →

The 2007 DFS Classic was a women's tennis tournament played on grass courts at the Edgbaston Priory Club in Birmingham in the United Kingdom that was part of Tier III of the 2007 WTA Tour. It was the 26th edition of the tournament was held from 11 June until 17 June 2007. Second-seeded Jelena Janković won the singles title.

== Finals ==
=== Singles ===
(Serbia) Jelena Janković defeated (Russia) Maria Sharapova 4–6, 6–3, 7–5

- It was Janković's 4th title of the year and the 6th of her career.

=== Doubles ===
(Chinese Taipei) Yung-jan Chan / (Chinese Taipei) Chia-jung Chuang defeated (China) Tiantian Sun / (United States) Meilen Tu 7–6^{(7–3)}, 6–3

- It was Chan's 2nd title of the year and the 3rd of her career. It was Chuang's 2nd title of the year and the 3rd of her career.
