= 2008 DFS Classic =

- Date: 9–15 June
- Edition: 27th
- Category: Tier III Series
- Draw: 56S / 16D
- Prize money: $200,000
- Surface: Grass / outdoor
- Location: Birmingham, United Kingdom
- Venue: Edgbaston Priory Club

Champions

Singles
- (Ukraine) Kateryna Bondarenko

Doubles
- (Zimbabwe) Cara Black / (United States) Liezel Huber
← 2007 ·	Birmingham Classic	· 2009 →

The 2008 DFS Classic was a women's tennis tournament played on outdoor grass courts. It was the 27th edition of the DFS Classic, and was part of the Tier III Series of the 2008 WTA Tour. It took place at the Edgbaston Priory Club in Birmingham, United Kingdom, from 9 June until 15 June 2008. Twelfth-seeded Kateryna Bondarenko won the singles title and earned $31,000 first-prize money.

== Finals ==
=== Singles ===
(Ukraine) Kateryna Bondarenko defeated (Belgium) Yanina Wickmayer, 7–6^{(9–7)}, 3–6, 7–6^{(7–4)}

- It was Kateryna Bondarenko's 1st career title.

=== Doubles ===
(Zimbabwe) Cara Black / (United States) Liezel Huber defeated (France) Séverine Brémond / (Spain) Virginia Ruano Pascual, 6–2, 6–1
