= 1991 Dow Classic =

- Date: 10–16 June
- Edition: 10th
- Category: Tier IV
- Draw: 56S / 28D
- Prize money: $150,000
- Surface: Grass / outdoor
- Location: Birmingham, United Kingdom
- Venue: Edgbaston Priory Club

Champions

Singles
- (United States) Martina Navratilova

Doubles
- (Australia) Nicole Provis / (Australia) Elizabeth Smylie
← 1990 ·	Birmingham Classic	· 1992 →

The 1991 Dow Classic was a women's tennis tournament played on outdoor grass courts that was part of Tier IV of the 1991 WTA Tour. It was the 10th edition of the tournament. It took place at the Edgbaston Priory Club in Birmingham, United Kingdom from 10 June until 16 June 1991. First-seeded Martina Navratilova won the singles title.

== Finals ==
=== Singles ===
(United States) Martina Navratilova defeated (Soviet Union) Natalia Zvereva 6–4, 7–6^{(8–6)}

- It was Navratilova's 3rd singles title of the year and the 155th of her career.

=== Doubles ===
(Australia) Nicole Provis / (Australia) Elizabeth Smylie defeated (United States) Sandy Collins / (South Africa) Elna Reinach 6–3, 6–4

- It was Provis' second doubles title of the year and the 6th of her career. It was Smylie's third doubles title of the year and the 31st of her career.

== Entrants ==
=== Seeds ===
Athlete	Nationality	Seeding
Martina Navratilova	United States	1
Zina Garrison	United States	2
Nathalie Tauziat	France	3
Natalia Zvereva	Soviet Union	4
Lori McNeil	United States	5
Meredith McGrath	United States	6
Naoko Sawamatsu	Japan	7
Manon Bollegraf	Netherlands	8
Gretchen Magers	Soviet Union	9
Claudia Kohde-Kilsch	West Germany	10
Catarina Lindqvist	Sweden	11
~~Ginger Helgeson~~	~~United States~~	~~12~~
Anne Minter	Australia	13
Stephanie Rehe	United States	14
Akiko Kijimuta	Japan	15
Pam Shriver	United States	16

=== Other entrants ===
The following players received entry from the qualifying draw:

- (United States) Katrina Adams
- (Indonesia) Suzanna Wibowo
- (United States) Sandy Collins
- (Australia) Jo-Anne Faull
- (Australia) Michelle Jaggard
- (Sweden) Maria Lindström
- (United States) Cammy MacGregor
- (Australia) Rennae Stubbs

The following players received a lucky loser spot:

- (Netherlands) Miriam Oremans
- (France) Catherine Suire
