= 1992 Dow Classic – Singles =

Singles
- 1992 Dow Classic
- 1991 Champion: (United States) Martina Navratilova

Final
- Champion: (Netherlands) Brenda Schultz
- Runner-up: (Australia) Jenny Byrne
- Score: 6–2, 6–2

Details
- Draw: 56
- Seeds: 16

Events
Singles	Doubles
← 1991 ·	Birmingham Classic	· 1993 →

Martina Navratilova was the defending champion but did not compete at the Dow Classic in 1992.

Brenda Schultz won in the final against Jenny Byrne, 6–2, 6–2.

== Seeds ==
The top eight seeds receive a bye into the second round.

1. (United States) Zina Garrison (quarterfinals)
2. (France) Nathalie Tauziat (third round)
3. (United States) Gigi Fernández (third round)
4. (United States) Lori McNeil (quarterfinals)
5. (Commonwealth of Independent States) Natalia Zvereva (third round)
6. (Netherlands) Brenda Schultz (Champion)
7. (United States) Pam Shriver (semifinals)
8. (Indonesia) Yayuk Basuki (third round)
9. (Soviet Union) Larisa Savchenko-Neiland (quarterfinals)
10. (United Kingdom) Jo Durie (semifinals)
11. (South Africa) Mariaan de Swardt (second round)
12. (United States) Patty Fendick (first round)
13. (South Africa) Elna Reinach (second round)
14. (Japan) Mana Endo (second round)
15. (United States) Kimberly Po (third round)
16. (United States) Katrina Adams (first round)

== Draw ==
=== Key ===
- Q = Qualifier
- WC = Wild card
- LL = Lucky loser
- Alt = Alternate
- ITF = ITF entry
- PR = Protected ranking
- SR = Special ranking
- SE = Special exempt
- JE = Junior exempt
- JR = Junior Accelerator Programme entrant
- CO = College Accelerator Programme entrant
- NG = Next Gen Accelerator Program entrant
- w/o = Walkover
- r = Retired
- d = Defaulted

=== Finals ===
Quarterfinals
1	(United States) Zina Garrison	5	3
7	(United States) Pam Shriver	7	6
9	(Soviet Union) Larisa Savchenko-Neiland	6^{3}	6^{6}
6	(Netherlands) Brenda Schultz	7^{7}	7^{8}
(Australia) Jenny Byrne	6	6
4	(United States) Lori McNeil	2	4
(Hungary) Andrea Temesvári-Trunkos	3	2
10	(United Kingdom) Jo Durie	6	6

Semifinals
7	(United States) Pam Shriver	4	6^{7}
6	(Netherlands) Brenda Schultz	6	7^{9}
(Australia) Jenny Byrne	6	6
10	(United Kingdom) Jo Durie	3	1

Final
6	(Netherlands) Brenda Schultz	6	6
(Australia) Jenny Byrne	2	2

=== Top half ===
==== Section 1 ====
First round
(France) A Zugasti	6	6
(United States) S McCarthy	2	4
Q	(Austria) H Sprung	4	3
Q	(United Kingdom) S-A Siddall	6	6
(Netherlands) S Rottier	0	ret.
13	(South Africa) E Reinach	6
12	(United States) P Fendick	4	7	2
(United States) M Jaggard-Lai	6	5	6
(Australia) J-A Faull	2	4
(United States) T Whittington	6	6
Q	(United States) E Burgin	4	4
(United States) L Allen	6	6

Second round
1	(United States) Z Garrison	6	6
(France) A Zugasti	0	3
Q	(United Kingdom) S-A Siddall	6	6
13	(South Africa) E Reinach	4	2
(United States) M Jaggard-Lai	6	6
(United States) T Whittington	0	1
(United States) L Allen	4	2
7	(United States) P Shriver	6	6

Third round
1	(United States) Z Garrison	6	6
Q	(United Kingdom) S-A Siddall	0	2
(United States) M Jaggard-Lai	4	1
7	(United States) P Shriver	6	6

Quarterfinals
1	(United States) Z Garrison	5	3
7	(United States) P Shriver	7	6

==== Section 2 ====
First round
(United Kingdom) A Grunfeld	4	7^{7}	6
LL	(Latvia) A Blumberga	6	6^{4}	4
Q	(New Zealand) J Richardson	6	5	6
(Italy) L Golarsa	2	7	4
LL	(United States) C Benjamin	1	2
9	(Soviet Union) L Savchenko-Neiland	6	6
16	(United States) K Adams	6^{1}	1
(United States) J Santrock	7^{7}	6
Q	(United Kingdom) V Lake	3	1
(Australia) R Stubbs	6	6
Q	(Australia) K Radford	6	6
WC	(United Kingdom) S Loosemore	3	4

Second round
3	(United States) G Fernández	6	6
(United Kingdom) A Grunfeld	1	2
Q	(New Zealand) J Richardson	6^{3}	1
9	(Soviet Union) L Savchenko-Neiland	7^{7}	6
(United States) J Santrock	3	4
(Australia) R Stubbs	6	6
Q	(Australia) K Radford	5	6	9
6	(Netherlands) B Schultz	7	4	11

Third round
3	(United States) G Fernández	4	4
9	(Soviet Union) L Savchenko-Neiland	6	6
WC	(Australia) R Stubbs	3	6	2
6	(Netherlands) B Schultz	6	4	6

Quarterfinals
9	(Soviet Union) L Savchenko-Neiland	6^{3}	6^{6}
6	(Netherlands) B Schultz	7^{7}	7^{8}

=== Bottom half ===
==== Section 3 ====
First round
(Australia) K Godridge	6	3	0
(France) C Suire	3	6	6
(Australia) J Byrne	7	7^{7}
(Australia) L Field	5	6^{1}
WC	(United Kingdom) C Wood	1	7^{10}	1
11	(South Africa) M de Swardt	6	6^{8}	6
15	(United States) K Po	7^{7}	6
(United States) H Ludloff	6^{4}	4
(Belgium) A Devries	7^{7}	3	4
Q	(United States) S Sampras	6^{5}	6	6
(Belgium) E Callens	2	2
(Netherlands) M Oremans	6	6

Second round
8	(Indonesia) Y Basuki	6	6
(France) C Suire	2	2
(Australia) J Byrne	6^{4}	6	6
11	(South Africa) M de Swardt	7^{7}	4	4
15	(United States) K Po	6	3	6
Q	(United States) S Sampras	0	6	1
(Netherlands) M Oremans	2	1
4	(United States) L McNeil	6	6

Third round
8	(Indonesia) Y Basuki	2	6	5
(Australia) J Byrne	6	4	7
15	(United States) K Po	4	3
4	(United States) L McNeil	6	6

Quarterfinals
(Australia) J Byrne	6	6
4	(United States) L McNeil	2	4

==== Section 4 ====
First round
(United States) E deLone	6	0	1
(France) N Guerrée	3	6	6
(United States) A Henricksson	6	4	2
(Hungary) A Temesvári-Trunkos	4	6	6
(Japan) M Kidowaki	2	1
9	(Japan) M Endo	6	6
10	(United Kingdom) J Durie	6	6
(United States) J Emmons	3	1
Q	(United States) C MacGregor	2	6	3
WC	(United States) B Nagelsen	6	3	6
(Sweden) M Strandlund	1	4
(South Africa) R Fairbank-Nideffer	6	6

Second round
5	(Commonwealth of Independent States) N Zvereva	6	6
(France) N Guerrée	2	1
(Hungary) A Temesvári-Trunkos	2	6	8
14	(Japan) M Endo	6	4	6
10	(United Kingdom) J Durie	6	6
WC	(United States) B Nagelsen	3	4
(South Africa) R Fairbank-Nideffer	4	3
2	(France) N Tauziat	6	6

Third round
5	(Commonwealth of Independent States) N Zvereva	6	6^{5}	4
(Hungary) A Temesvári-Trunkos	1	7^{7}	6
10	(United Kingdom) J Durie	5	6	6
2	(France) N Tauziat	7	3	4

Quarterfinals
(Hungary) A Temesvári-Trunkos	3	2
10	(United Kingdom) J Durie	6	6
