= 2006 DFS Classic =

- Date: 12–18 June
- Edition: 25th
- Category: Tier III
- Draw: 56S / 16D
- Surface: Grass / outdoor
- Location: Birmingham, United Kingdom
- Venue: Edgbaston Priory Club

Champions

Singles
- (Russia) Vera Zvonareva

Doubles
- (Serbia and Montenegro) Jelena Janković / (China) Li Na
- Birmingham Classic

The 2006 DFS Classic was a women's tennis tournament played on grass courts at the Edgbaston Priory Club in Birmingham in the United Kingdom that was part of Tier III of the 2006 WTA Tour. It was the 25th edition of the tournament and was held from 12 June until 18 June 2006. Unseeded Vera Zvonareva won the singles title.

== Finals ==
=== Singles ===
(Russia) Vera Zvonareva defeated (United States) Jamea Jackson 7–6^{(14–12)}, 7–6^{(7–5)}

- It was Zvonareva's 2nd title of the year and the 7th of her career.

=== Doubles ===
(Serbia and Montenegro) Jelena Janković / (China) Li Na defeated (United States) Jill Craybas / (South Africa) Liezel Huber 6–2, 6–4

- It was Janković's only title of the year and the 2nd of her career. It was Na's only title of the year and the 3rd of her career.
