= 1992 Dow Classic – Doubles =

Doubles
- 1992 Dow Classic
- 1991 Champions: (Australia) Nicole Provis (Australia) Elizabeth Smylie

Final
- Champions: (United States) Lori McNeil (Australia) Rennae Stubbs
- Runners-up: (United States) Sandy Collins (South Africa) Elna Reinach
- Score: 5–7, 6–3, 8–6

Events
| Singles | Doubles |
| ← 1991 · | Birmingham Classic | · 1993 → |

Nicole Provis and Elizabeth Smylie were the defending champions but were defeated in the quarterfinals by Jo-Anne Faull and Julie Richardson.

Lori McNeil and Rennae Stubbs won in the final against Sandy Collins and Elna Reinach, 5–7, 6–3, 8–6.

== Seeds ==
Champion seeds are indicated in bold text while text in italics indicates the round in which those seeds were eliminated. The top four seeded teams received byes into the second round.

1. (United States) Sandy Collins / (South Africa) Elna Reinach (final)
2. **(United States) Lori McNeil / (Australia) Rennae Stubbs (Champions)**
3. (Australia) Nicole Provis / (Australia) Elizabeth Smylie (quarterfinals)
4. (France) Isabelle Demongeot / (France) Nathalie Tauziat (second round)
5. (South Africa) Rosalyn Fairbank-Nideffer / (Netherlands) Brenda Schultz (quarterfinals)
6. (Indonesia) Yayuk Basuki / (United Kingdom) Jo Durie (first round)
7. (Australia) Louise Field / (South Africa) Lise Gregory (quarterfinals)
8. (United States) Katrina Adams / (United States) Louise Allen (second round)

== Draw ==
=== Key ===
- Q = Qualifier
- WC = Wild card
- LL = Lucky loser
- Alt = Alternate
- SE = Special exempt
- PR = Protected ranking
- ITF = ITF entry
- JE = Junior exempt
- w/o = Walkover
- r = Retired
- d = Defaulted
- SR = Special ranking

=== Finals ===
Semifinals

Final

1
- (United States) **S Collins**
- (South Africa) **E Reinach**
**6**
**6**

- (Australia) J-A Faull
- (New Zealand) J Richardson
3
4

1
- (United States) S Collins
- (South Africa) E Reinach
**7**
3
6

2
- (United States) **L McNeil**
- (Australia) **R Stubbs**
5
**6**
**8**

- (United States) E Burgin
- (South Africa) M de Swardt
2
**7^{7}**
2

2
- (United States) **L McNeil**
- (Australia) **R Stubbs**
**6**
6^{5}
**6**

=== Top half ===
First round

Second round

Quarterfinals

Semifinals

1
- (United States) **S Collins**
- (South Africa) **E Reinach**
**7^{8}**
**6**

- (Netherlands) M Oremans
- (Australia) L Pleming
4
4

- (Japan) E Iida
- (Australia) K Radford
6^{6}
4

- (Japan) **E Iida**
- (Australia) **K Radford**
**6**
**6**

1
- (United States) **S Collins**
- (South Africa) **E Reinach**
**6**
6^{5}
**6**

- (United Kingdom) B Borneo
- (United Kingdom) C Wood
6^{0}
4

- (Italy) L Golarsa
- (France) C Suire
4
**7^{7}**
4

- (Italy) **L Golarsa**
- (France) **C Suire**
**7^{7}**
**6**

- (Italy) **L Golarsa**
- (France) **C Suire**
**6**
**6**

- (United States) J Fuchs
- (Sweden) M Strandlund
**7^{8}**
2
4

8
- (United States) K Adams
- (United States) L Allen
3
2

8
- (United States) **K Adams**
- (United States) **L Allen**
6^{6}
**6**
**6**

1
- (United States) **S Collins**
- (South Africa) **E Reinach**
**6**
**6**

- (Australia) J-A Faull
- (New Zealand) J Richardson
3
4

3
- (Australia) **N Provis**
- (Australia) **L Smylie**
**6**
5
**7**

- (Australia) **K-A Guse**
- (Australia) **T Morton**
**6**
4
**6**

- (Australia) K-A Guse
- (Australia) T Morton
0
**7**
5

- (Japan) M Kidowaki
- (Hungary) A Temesvári
3
**6**
3

3
- (Australia) N Provis
- (Australia) L Smylie
5
3

- (Sweden) M Lindström
- (United States) H Ludloff
3
3

- (Australia) **J-A Faull**
- (New Zealand) **J Richardson**
**7**
**6**

- (Australia) **M Jaggard-Lai**
- (Netherlands) **C Vis**
**6**
**6**

- (Australia) M Jaggard-Lai
- (Netherlands) C Vis
3
4

- (Australia) **J-A Faull**
- (New Zealand) **J Richardson**
3
**7**
**6**

- (Australia) **J-A Faull**
- (New Zealand) **J Richardson**
**6**
**6**

6
- (Indonesia) Y Basuki
- (United Kingdom) J Durie
**6**
5
4

=== Bottom half ===
First round

Second round

Quarterfinals

Semifinals

7
- (Australia) **L Field**
- (South Africa) **L Gregory**
1
**7**
**6**

LL
- (Australia) D Jones
- (South Africa) T Price
**6**
5
2

7
- (Australia) **L Field**
- (South Africa) **L Gregory**
**6**
4
**6**

- (United States) B Nagelsen
- (Latvia) L Savchenko-Neiland
**6**
6^{7}
1

Q
- (Australia) J Hodder
- (Australia) A Woolcock
3
**6**
3

Q
- (Australia) **J Hodder**
- (Australia) **A Woolcock**
3
**7^{9}**
**6**

7
- (Australia) L Field
- (South Africa) L Gregory
3
2

- (United States) **E Burgin**
- (South Africa) **M de Swardt**
**6**
5
**9**

- (United States) **E Burgin**
- (South Africa) **M de Swardt**
**6**
**6**

- (United States) C Benjamin
- (United States) J Santrock
3
**7**
7

- (United States) **E Burgin**
- (South Africa) **M de Swardt**
**6**
**7^{12}**

4
- (France) I Demongeot
- (France) N Tauziat
4
6^{10}

- (United States) E Burgin
- (South Africa) M de Swardt
2
**7^{7}**
2

5
- (South Africa) **R Fairbank-Nideffer**
- (Netherlands) **B Schultz**
**6**
**7**

2
- (United States) **L McNeil**
- (Australia) **R Stubbs**
**6**
6^{5}
**6**

- (United States) N Arendt
- (United States) S McCarthy
3
5

5
- (South Africa) **R Fairbank-Nideffer**
- (Netherlands) **B Schultz**
6^{5}
**6**
**6**

- (United States) **J Emmons**
- (United States) **A Henricksson**
4
**6**
**6**

- (United States) J Emmons
- (United States) A Henricksson
**7^{7}**
3
1

WC
- (United Kingdom) M Javer
- (United Kingdom) V Lake
**6**
3
0

7
- (South Africa) R Fairbank-Nideffer
- (Netherlands) B Schultz
6^{5}
**6**
5

- (United Kingdom) C Hall
- (United Kingdom) S-A Siddall
1
1

2
- (United States) **L McNeil**
- (Australia) **R Stubbs**
**7^{7}**
1
**7**

- (Mexico) **L Novelo**
- (Australia) **L Stacey**
**6**
**6**

- (Mexico) L Novelo
- (Australia) L Stacey
5
5

2
- (United States) **L McNeil**
- (Australia) **R Stubbs**
**7**
**7**
