= 1994 DFS Classic – Doubles =

Doubles
- 1994 DFS Classic
- 1993 Champions: (United States) Lori McNeil (United States) Martina Navratilova

Final
- Champions: (United States) Zina Garrison-Jackson (Latvia) Larisa Neiland
- Runners-up: (Australia) Catherine Barclay (Australia) Kerry-Anne Guse
- Score: 6–4, 6–4

Events
Singles	Doubles
← 1993 ·	Birmingham Classic	· 1995 →

Lori McNeil and Martina Navratilova were the defending champions but only McNeil competed that year. She competed with Rennae Stubbs but lost in the second round to Catherine Barclay and Kerry-Anne Guse.

Zina Garrison-Jackson and Larisa Neiland won in the final against Barclay and Guse, 6–4, 6–4.

== Seeds ==
Champion seeds are indicated in bold text while text in italics indicates the round in which those seeds were eliminated. The top four seeded teams received byes into the second round.

1. (United States) Patty Fendick / (United States) Meredith McGrath (semifinals)
2. (United States) Pam Shriver / (Australia) Elizabeth Smylie (second round)
3. (United States) **Zina Garrison-Jackson / (Latvia) Larisa Neiland (Champions)**
4. (United States) Lori McNeil / (Australia) Rennae Stubbs (second round)
5. (United States) Katrina Adams / (Netherlands) Manon Bollegraf (second round)
6. (Italy) Laura Golarsa / (Netherlands) Caroline Vis (quarterfinals)
7. (Australia) Jenny Byrne / (New Zealand) Julie Richardson (quarterfinals)
8. (United States) Nicole Arendt / (Australia) Kristine Radford (quarterfinals)

== Draw ==
=== Key ===
- Q = Qualifier
- WC = Wild card
- LL = Lucky loser
- Alt = Alternate
- SE = Special exempt
- PR = Protected ranking
- ITF = ITF entry
- JE = Junior exempt
- w/o = Walkover
- r = Retired
- d = Defaulted
- SR = Special ranking

=== Finals ===
Semifinals

Final

1
- (United States) P Fendick
- (United States) M McGrath
4
3

3
**(United States) Z Garrison-Jackson**
**(Latvia) L Neiland**
**6**
**6**

3
**(United States) Z Garrison-Jackson**
**(Latvia) L Neiland**
**6**
**6**

- (Australia) C Barclay
- (Australia) K-A Guse
4
4

- (Australia) **C Barclay**
- (Australia) **K-A Guse**
**6**
**6**

- (United Kingdom) V Lake
- (United Kingdom) C Wood
4
4

=== Top half ===
First round

Second round

Quarterfinals

Semifinals

1
- (United States) **P Fendick**
- (United States) **M McGrath**
**6**
**6**

- (Australia) M Jaggard-Lai
- (South Africa) E Reinach
4
**6**
5

- (United States) S Collins
- (South Africa) M de Swardt
3
3

- (United States) **S Collins**
- (South Africa) **M de Swardt**
**6**
4
**7**

1
- (United States) **P Fendick**
- (United States) **M McGrath**
**6**
**6**

- (Netherlands) C Bakkum
- (United States) A Henricksson
2
2

7
- (Australia) J Byrne
- (New Zealand) J Richardson
1
2

- (Belgium) **N Feber**
- (Japan) **R Hiraki**
**6**
**6**

- (Belgium) N Feber
- (Japan) R Hiraki
4
3

- (United States) A deLone
- (United States) E deLone
2
1

7
- (Australia) **J Byrne**
- (New Zealand) **J Richardson**
**6**
**6**

7
- (Australia) **J Byrne**
- (New Zealand) **J Richardson**
**6**
**6**

1
- (United States) P Fendick
- (United States) M McGrath
4
3

3
- (United States) **Z Garrison-Jackson**
- (Latvia) **L Neiland**
**6**
**6**

3
- (United States) **Z Garrison-Jackson**
- (Latvia) **L Neiland**
**6**
**6**

- (United States) C Benjamin
- (Ukraine) E Brioukhovets
**6**
1
2

- (Australia) J-A Faull
- (South Africa) T Price
3
2

- (Australia) **J-A Faull**
- (South Africa) **T Price**
4
**6**
**6**

3
- (United States) **Z Garrison-Jackson**
- (Latvia) **L Neiland**
5
**6**
**6**

WC
- (United Kingdom) **K Cross**
- (United Kingdom) **J Pullin**
5
**6**
**6**

6
- (Italy) L Golarsa
- (Netherlands) C Vis
**7**
2
4

Q
- (Italy) E Brusati
- (Italy) R Grande
**7**
4
3

WC
- (United Kingdom) K Cross
- (United Kingdom) J Pullin
2
4

- (France) K Quentrec
- (France) S Testud
5
4

6
- (Italy) **L Golarsa**
- (Netherlands) **C Vis**
**6**
**6**

6
- (Italy) **L Golarsa**
- (Netherlands) **C Vis**
**7**
**6**

=== Bottom half ===
First round

Second round

Quarterfinals

Semifinals

8
- (United States) **N Arendt**
- (Australia) **K Radford**
**7^{7}**
**7^{7}**

- (United States) S McCarthy
- (United States) S Reece
6^{1}
6^{1}

8
- (United States) **N Arendt**
- (Australia) **K Radford**
**6**
**6**

WC
- (United Kingdom) C Taylor
- (United Kingdom) J Ward
0
1

- (France) I Demongeot
- (United Kingdom) J Durie
3
2

- (France) **I Demongeot**
- (United Kingdom) **J Durie**
**6**
**6**

8
- (United States) N Arendt
- (Australia) K Radford
4
4

- (Australia) K Godridge
- (Japan) A Sugiyama
**6**
6^{5}
1

- (Australia) **C Barclay**
- (Australia) **K-A Guse**
**6**
**6**

- (Australia) **C Barclay**
- (Australia) **K-A Guse**
3
**7^{7}**
**6**

- (Australia) **C Barclay**
- (Australia) **K-A Guse**
3
**6**
2

4
- (United States) L McNeil
- (Australia) R Stubbs
**6**
1
**6**

- (Australia) **C Barclay**
- (Australia) **K-A Guse**
**6**
**6**

5
- (United States) **K Adams**
- (Netherlands) **M Bollegraf**
**6**
**6**

- (United Kingdom) V Lake
- (United Kingdom) C Wood
4
4

- (Slovenia) T Križan
- (Croatia) I Majoli
3
4

5
- (United States) K Adams
- (Netherlands) M Bollegraf
6^{4}
**6**
**6**

- (Australia) **R McQuillan**
- (Netherlands) **M Oremans**
**7**
**7^{7}**

- (Australia) **R McQuillan**
- (Netherlands) **M Oremans**
**7^{7}**
3
2

- (Finland) N Dahlman
- (Australia) L Field
5
6^{2}

- (Australia) R McQuillan
- (Netherlands) M Oremans
**7**
3
3

- (United States) B Nagelsen
- (Netherlands) B Schultz
3
6

- (United Kingdom) **V Lake**
- (United Kingdom) **C Wood**
5
**6**
**6**

- (United Kingdom) **V Lake**
- (United Kingdom) **C Wood**
**6**
**7**

- (United Kingdom) **V Lake**
- (United Kingdom) **C Wood**
0
**7^{7}**
**6**

2
- (United States) N Arendt
- (United States) P Shriver
**6**
6^{5}
2
