= Agnès Zugasti =

French tennis player (born 1972)

- Country (sports): France
- Born: 15 May 1972 (age 52)
- Retired: 1993
- Prize money: $38,623

Singles
- Career record: 67-52
- Career titles: 3 ITF
- Highest ranking: No. 169 (13 January 1992)

Grand Slam singles results
- French Open: 1R (1992)

Doubles
- Career record: 10-11
- Career titles: 1 ITF
- Highest ranking: No. 302 (26 October 1992)

Agnès Zugasti (born 15 May 1972) is a French tennis player.

== Biography ==
Zugasti reached a best singles ranking of 169 in the world, with three ITF titles.

During the early 1990s, she competed in WTA Tour events. She took Nathalie Tauziat, then the world number 15, to a final set tiebreak in a first round loss at Bayonne in 1991. Her only main draw win came at the 1992 Birmingham Classic, where she beat Shannan McCarthy before being eliminated in the second round by top seed Zina Garrison.

At the 1992 French Open she played as a wildcard in the women's singles.

== ITF finals ==
=== Singles (3–2) ===
Legend
$25,000 tournaments
$10,000 tournaments

Result	No.	Date	Tournament	Surface	Opponent	Score
Win	1.	26 February 1990	Wigan, United Kingdom	Hard	(West Germany) Tanja Hauschildt	1–6, 6–3, 6–3
Loss	2.	25 February 1991	Lisbon, Portugal	Clay	(Denmark) Sofie Albinus	7–6, 3–6, 5–7
Win	3.	29 April 1991	Barcelona, Spain	Clay	(Spain) Ana-Belen Quintana	6–3, 6–2
Win	4.	6 May 1991	Lerida, Spain	Clay	(Spain) Estefania Bottini	4–6, 7–5, 6–2
Loss	5.	3 June 1991	Milan, Italy	Clay	(Romania) Irina Spîrlea	4–6, 5–7

=== Doubles (1–0) ===
Result	No.	Date	Tournament	Surface	Partner	Opponents	Score
Win	1.	3 December 1990	Le Havre, France	Clay	(France) Julie Halard-Decugis	(Netherlands) Gaby Coorengel (Netherlands) Amy van Buuren	6–3, 6–0
