= 1994 DFS Classic – Singles =

Singles
- 1994 DFS Classic
- 1993 Champion: (United States) Lori McNeil

Final
- Champion: (United States) Lori McNeil
- Runner-up: (United States) Zina Garrison-Jackson
- Score: 6–2, 6–2

Details
- Draw: 56 (8 Q / 3 WC )
- Seeds: 16

Events
Singles	Doubles
← 1993 ·	Birmingham Classic	· 1995 →

Lori McNeil was the defending champion and won in the final, 6–2, 6–2, against Zina Garrison-Jackson.

== Seeds ==
The top eight seeds receive a bye into the second round.

1. (United States) Zina Garrison-Jackson (final)
2. (United States) Lori McNeil (Champion)
3. (Croatia) Iva Majoli (quarterfinals)
4. (France) Nathalie Tauziat (semifinals)
5. (Netherlands) Brenda Schultz (semifinals)
6. (United States) Patty Fendick (third round)
7. (United States) Meredith McGrath (second round)
8. (United States) Pam Shriver (quarterfinals)
9. (Latvia) Larisa Neiland (third round)
10. (Netherlands) Miriam Oremans (third round)
11. (Australia) Kristine Radford (third round)
12. (Australia) Rachel McQuillan (third round)
13. (South Africa) Elna Reinach (third round)
14. (South Africa) Joannette Kruger (quarterfinals)
15. (Italy) Laura Golarsa (quarterfinals)
16. (United Kingdom) Clare Wood (third round)

== Draw ==
=== Key ===
- Q = Qualifier
- WC = Wild card
- LL = Lucky loser
- Alt = Alternate
- SE = Special exempt
- PR = Protected ranking
- ITF = ITF entry
- JE = Junior exempt
- w/o = Walkover
- r = Retired
- d = Defaulted
- SR = Special ranking

=== Finals ===
Quarterfinals
1	(United States) Zina Garrison-Jackson	6	6
15	(Italy) Laura Golarsa	4	2
4	(France) Nathalie Tauziat	6	6
8	(United States) Pam Shriver	1	3
5	(Netherlands) Brenda Schultz	6	5	6
3	(Croatia) Iva Majoli	4	7	0
14	(South Africa) Joannette Kruger	3	4
2	(United States) Lori McNeil	6	6

Semifinals
1	(United States) Zina Garrison-Jackson	6	3	6
4	(France) Nathalie Tauziat	4	6	2
5	(Netherlands) Brenda Schultz	6	5	2
2	(United States) Lori McNeil	3	7	6

Final
1	(United States) Zina Garrison-Jackson	2	2
2	(United States) Lori McNeil	6	6

=== Top half ===
==== Section 1 ====
First round
Q	(France) I Demongeot	3	6	3
(Netherlands) C Vis	6	3	6
Q	(United Kingdom) J Pullin	6	6
(Italy) R Grande	3	3
WC	(United Kingdom) J Durie	6	3	3
13	(South Africa) E Reinach	4	6	6
15	(Italy) L Golarsa	6	6
WC	(United Kingdom) C Taylor	1	4
(Belgium) N Feber	0	6	5
(Paraguay) L Schaerer	6	3	7
Q	(United States) S McCarthy	6^{5}	4
(South Africa) M de Swardt	7^{7}	6

Second round
1	(United States) Z Garrison-Jackson	6	3	7
(Netherlands) C Vis	4	6	5
Q	(United Kingdom) J Pullin	5	3
13	(South Africa) E Reinach	7	6
15	(Italy) L Golarsa	6	6
(Paraguay) L Schaerer	2	2
(South Africa) M de Swardt	2	1
6	(United States) P Fendick	6	6

Third round
1	(United States) Z Garrison-Jackson	6	6
13	(South Africa) E Reinach	3	3
15	(Italy) L Golarsa	6	6
6	(United States) P Fendick	4	2

Quarterfinals
1	(United States) Z Garrison-Jackson	6	6
15	(Italy) L Golarsa	4	2

==== Section 2 ====
First round
LL	(United States) J Steven	4	7	5
(United States) A Henricksson	6	5	7
Q	(Ukraine) E Tatarkova	3	4
(Belgium) E Callens	6	6
(Japan) M Miyauchi	2	6^{3}
10	(Netherlands) M Oremans	6	7^{7}
12	(Australia) R McQuillan	6	6
(South Africa) D Van Rensburg	2	1
Q	(South Africa) M Joubert	2	2
(Australia) M Jaggard-Lai	6	6
(Ukraine) E Brioukhovets	4	6	1
(Germany) C Singer	6	3	6

Second round
4	(France) N Tauziat	6	6
(United States) A Henricksson	3	3
(Belgium) E Callens	4	2
10	(Netherlands) M Oremans	6	6
12	(Australia) R McQuillan	6	1	6
(Australia) M Jaggard-Lai	2	6	4
(Germany) C Singer	4	1
8	(United States) P Shriver	6	6

Third round
4	(France) N Tauziat	6^{2}	7^{7}	6
10	(Netherlands) M Oremans	7^{7}	6^{4}	3
12	(Australia) R McQuillan	0	4
8	(United States) P Shriver	6	6

Quarterfinals
4	(France) N Tauziat	6	6
8	(United States) P Shriver	1	3

=== Bottom half ===
==== Section 3 ====
First round
(Australia) E Smylie	6	6
(United States) K Adams	4	4
(Netherlands) C Wegink	2	2
Q	(United Kingdom) S-A Siddall	6	6
(Japan) A Sugiyama	4	6	3
16	(United Kingdom) C Wood	6	3	6
11	(Australia) K Radford	6	6
(Finland) N Dahlman	1	1
Q	(Australia) N Pratt	2	6	6
(Australia) J Byrne	6	3	4
(United States) N Arendt	6	7
(Netherlands) M Bollegraf	2	5

Second round
5	(Netherlands) B Schultz	6	6
(Australia) E Smylie	3	3
Q	(United Kingdom) S-A Siddall	2	3
16	(United Kingdom) C Wood	6	6
11	(Australia) K Radford	6	6
Q	(Australia) N Pratt	1	2
(United States) N Arendt	6	3	6
3	(Croatia) I Majoli	3	6	8

Third round
5	(Netherlands) B Schultz	6	6
16	(United Kingdom) C Wood	1	3
11	(Australia) K Radford	6^{2}	6	4
3	(Croatia) I Majoli	7^{7}	2	6

Quarterfinals
5	(Netherlands) B Schultz	6	5	6
3	(Croatia) I Majoli	4	7	0

==== Section 4 ====
First round
(Slovenia) T Križan	2	6	6
(France) K Quentrec	6	1	1
(Australia) R Stubbs	5	1
(United States) J Watanabe	7	6
WC	(United Kingdom) M Javer	3	1
14	(South Africa) J Kruger	6	6
9	(Latvia) L Neiland	3	7	6
(South Africa) T Price	6	5	2
Q	(Australia) K-A Guse	4	3
(Netherlands) P Kamstra	6	6
(United States) E deLone	2	4
(Australia) K Godridge	6	6

Second round
7	(United States) M McGrath	4	3
(Slovenia) T Križan	6	6
(United States) J Watanabe	4	4
14	(South Africa) J Kruger	6	6
9	(Latvia) L Neiland	7	6
(Netherlands) P Kamstra	5	2
(Australia) K Godridge	0	4
2	(United States) L McNeil	6	6

Third round
(Slovenia) T Križan	6^{3}	4
14	(South Africa) J Kruger	7^{7}	6
9	(Latvia) L Neiland	4	5
2	(United States) L McNeil	6	7

Quarterfinals
14	(South Africa) J Kruger	3	4
2	(United States) L McNeil	6	6
