= 1993 DFS Classic – Singles =

Singles
- 1993 DFS Classic
- 1992 Champion: (Netherlands) Brenda Schultz

Final
- Champion: (United States) Lori McNeil
- Runner-up: (United States) Zina Garrison-Jackson
- Score: 6–4, 2–6, 6–3

Details
- Draw: 56 (6 Q / 3 WC )
- Seeds: 16

Events
Singles	Doubles
← 1992 ·	Birmingham Classic	· 1994 →

Brenda Schultz was the defending champion but did not compete at the DFS Classic in 1993.

Lori McNeil won in the final, 6–4, 2–6, 6–3, against Zina Garrison-Jackson.

== Seeds ==
The top eight seeds receive a bye into the second round.

1. (United States) Martina Navratilova (third round)
2. (South Africa) Amanda Coetzer (third round)
3. (France) Nathalie Tauziat (quarterfinals)
4. (United States) Zina Garrison-Jackson (final)
5. (United States) Lori McNeil (Champion)
6. (United States) Patty Fendick (second round)
7. (United States) Pam Shriver (quarterfinals)
8. (Latvia) Larisa Neiland (semifinals)
9. (Japan) Mana Endo (third round)
10. (United States) Linda Harvey-Wild (first round)
11. (United States) Ginger Helgeson (first round)
12. (South Africa) Rosalyn Nideffer (second round)
13. (United States) Kimberly Po (second round)
14. (South Africa) Elna Reinach (third round)
15. (United States) Chanda Rubin (semifinals)
16. (Netherlands) Manon Bollegraf (first round)

== Draw ==
=== Key ===
- Q = Qualifier
- WC = Wild card
- LL = Lucky loser
- Alt = Alternate
- SE = Special exempt
- PR = Protected ranking
- ITF = ITF entry
- JE = Junior exempt
- w/o = Walkover
- r = Retired
- d = Defaulted
- SR = Special ranking

=== Finals ===
Quarterfinals
(Australia) Kristine Radford	3	2
8	(Latvia) Larisa Neiland	6	6
3	(France) Nathalie Tauziat	4	3
5	(United States) Lori McNeil	6	6
7	(United States) Pam Shriver	6	3	2
4	(United States) Zina Garrison-Jackson	4	6	6
(Italy) Laura Golarsa	6	5	4
15	(United States) Chanda Rubin	2	7	6

Semifinals
8	(Latvia) Larisa Neiland	5	1
5	(United States) Lori McNeil	7	6
4	(United States) Zina Garrison-Jackson	6	6
15	(United States) Chanda Rubin	1	2

Final
5	(United States) Lori McNeil	6	2	6
4	(United States) Zina Garrison-Jackson	4	6	3

=== Top half ===
==== Section 1 ====
First round
Q	(United States) A Henricksson	6	4	5
LL	(Sweden) M Strandlund	3	6	7
(Australia) R McQuillan	5	6	6
(Czech Republic) A Strnadová	7	2	4
(Australia) K Radford	7	7
11	(United States) G Helgeson	5	5
16	(Netherlands) M Bollegraf	6^{6}	5
(United States) M McGrath	7^{8}	7
WC	(United Kingdom) A Grunfeld	6	3	2
(Australia) E Smylie	1	6	6
(Greece) C Papadáki	3	2
(Australia) R Stubbs	6	6

Second round
1	(United States) M Navratilova	7	7^{7}
LL	(Sweden) M Strandlund	5	6^{1}
(Australia) R McQuillan	5	3
(Australia) K Radford	7	6
(United States) M McGrath	1	6	3
(Australia) E Smylie	6	2	6
(Australia) R Stubbs	6	1	4
8	(Latvia) L Neiland	1	6	6

Third round
1	(United States) M Navratilova	6	4	3
(Australia) K Radford	2	6	6
(Australia) E Smylie	4	5
8	(Latvia) L Neiland	6	7

Quarterfinals
(Australia) K Radford	3	2
8	(Latvia) L Neiland	6	6

==== Section 2 ====
First round
(Italy) S Farina	6	7^{7}
(Poland) K Teodorowicz	1	6^{3}
(Netherlands) C Wegink	6	6
(Japan) N Miyagi	0	2
Q	(United States) T Whittington	6	3	3
13	(United States) K Po	3	6	6
10	(United States) L Harvey-Wild	6	3	4
(Romania) R Dragomir	3	6	6
(United Kingdom) C Wood	6	6
(Netherlands) M Kiene	3	1
(Germany) C Porwik	4	0
(Japan) M Miyauchi	6	6

Second round
3	(France) N Tauziat	6^{3}	6	6
(Italy) S Farina	7^{7}	2	2
(Netherlands) C Wegink	6	6
13	(United States) K Po	1	2
(Romania) R Dragomir	4	4
(United Kingdom) C Wood	6	6
(Japan) M Miyauchi	5	2
5	(United States) L McNeil	7	6

Third round
3	(France) N Tauziat	6	6
(Netherlands) C Wegink	3	4
(United Kingdom) C Wood	3	4
5	(United States) L McNeil	6	6

Quarterfinals
3	(France) N Tauziat	4	3
5	(United States) L McNeil	6	6

=== Bottom half ===
==== Section 3 ====
First round
WC	(United Kingdom) S-A Siddall	6^{8}	7^{7}	2
(United States) M Jaggard-Lai	7^{10}	6^{5}	6
(Peru) L Gildemeister	4	2
(South Africa) J Kruger	6	6
(Belarus) T Ignatieva	3	1
9	(Japan) M Endo	6	6
12	(South Africa) R Nideffer	6	6
(Netherlands) K Boogert	2	4
(Sweden) C Dahlman	6^{0}	0
Q	(United States) K Adams	7^{7}	6
(United States) L Allen	4	2
Q	(United States) C MacGregor	6	6

Second round
7	(United States) P Shriver	7	6
(United States) M Jaggard-Lai	5	3
(South Africa) J Kruger	1	3
9	(Japan) M Endo	6	6
12	(South Africa) R Nideffer	6	2	8
Q	(United States) K Adams	4	6	10
Q	(United States) C MacGregor	2	5
4	(United States) Z Garrison-Jackson	6	7

Third round
7	(United States) P Shriver	4	7^{7}	6
9	(Japan) M Endo	6	6^{5}	4
Q	(United States) K Adams	3	2
4	(United States) Z Garrison-Jackson	6	6

Quarterfinals
7	(United States) P Shriver	6	3	2
4	(United States) Z Garrison-Jackson	4	6	6

==== Section 4 ====
First round
(Italy) L Golarsa	3	6	7
(Japan) A Sugiyama	6	3	5
(Japan) K Nagatsuka	4	3
(Ukraine) E Brioukhovets	6	6
Q	(France) S Amiach	4	5
14	(South Africa) E Reinach	6	7
15	(United States) C Rubin	6	6
(South Africa) T Price	4	2
(Australia) J Byrne	6	6
(United States) C Cunningham	1	4
WC	(United Kingdom) L Woodroffe	1	3
Q	(United States) S McCarthy	6	6

Second round
6	(United States) P Fendick	3	6	4
(Italy) L Golarsa	6	3	6
(Ukraine) E Brioukhovets	4	4
14	(South Africa) E Reinach	6	6
15	(United States) C Rubin	6	7
(Australia) J Byrne	3	5
Q	(United States) S McCarthy	2	2
2	(South Africa) A Coetzer	6	6

Third round
(Italy) L Golarsa	6	6
14	(South Africa) E Reinach	3	4
15	(United States) C Rubin	7^{7}	6
2	(South Africa) A Coetzer	6^{1}	2

Quarterfinals
(Italy) L Golarsa	6	5	4
15	(United States) C Rubin	2	7	6
