= 1992 Dow Classic =

- Date: 8–14 June
- Edition: 11th
- Category: Tier IV
- Draw: 56S / 28D
- Prize money: $150,000
- Surface: Grass / outdoor
- Location: Birmingham, United Kingdom
- Venue: Edgbaston Priory Club

Champions

Singles
- (Netherlands) Brenda Schultz

Doubles
- (United States) Lori McNeil / (Australia) Rennae Stubbs
| ← 1991 · | Birmingham Classic | · 1993 → |

The 1992 Dow Classic was a women's tennis tournament played on outdoor grass courts that was part of Tier IV of the 1992 WTA Tour. It was the 11th edition of the event and the last to be named the "Dow Classic" before the tournament sponsor changed to DFS. It took place at the Edgbaston Priory Club in Birmingham, United Kingdom from 8 June until 14 June 1992.

== Entrants ==
=== Seeds ===
| Athlete | Nationality | Seeding |
|---|---|---|
| Zina Garrison-Jackson | United States | 1 |
| Nathalie Tauziat | France | 2 |
| Gigi Fernández | United States | 3 |
| Lori McNeil | United States | 4 |
| Natalia Zvereva | CIS | 5 |
| Brenda Schultz | Netherlands | 6 |
| Pam Shriver | United States | 7 |
| Yayuk Basuki | Indonesia | 8 |
| Larisa Savchenko | Soviet Union | 9 |
| Jo Durie | Great Britain | 10 |
| Mariaan de Swardt | South Africa | 11 |
| Patty Fendick | United States | 12 |
| Elna Reinach | South Africa | 13 |
| Mana Endo | Japan | 14 |
| Kimberly Po | United States | 15 |
| Katrina Adams | United States | 16 |

=== Other entrants ===
The following players received wildcards into the main draw:

- (United States) Betsy Nagelsen
- (Australia) Rennae Stubbs
- (United Kingdom) Clare Wood

The following players received entry from the qualifying draw:

- (United States) Elise Burgin
- (United Kingdom) Valda Lake
- (United States) Cammy MacGregor
- (New Zealand) Julie Richardson
- (United States) Stella Sampras
- (United Kingdom) Shirli-Ann Siddall
- (Austria) Heidi Sprung

The following players received a lucky loser spot:

- (United States) Camille Benjamin
- (Latvia) Agnese Blumberga

== Finals ==
=== Singles ===
(Netherlands) Brenda Schultz defeated (Australia) Jenny Byrne 6–2, 6–2

- It was Schultz's first title of the year and the 2nd of her career.

=== Doubles ===
(United States) Lori McNeil / (Australia) Rennae Stubbs defeated (United States) Sandy Collins / (South Africa) Elna Reinach 5–7, 6–3, 8–6

- It was McNeil's first doubles title of the year and the 24th of her career. It was Stubbs' third doubles title of the year and the 3rd of her career.
