= 1993 DFS Classic – Doubles =

Doubles
- 1993 DFS Classic
- 1992 Champions: (United States) Lori McNeil (Australia) Rennae Stubbs

Final
- Champions: (United States) Lori McNeil (United States) Martina Navratilova
- Runners-up: (United States) Pam Shriver (Australia) Elizabeth Smylie
- Score: 6–3, 6–4

Events
Singles	Doubles
← 1992 ·	Birmingham Classic	· 1994 →

Lori McNeil and Rennae Stubbs were the defending champions but only McNeil competed that year. She competed with Martina Navratilova and won in the final against Pam Shriver and Elizabeth Smylie, 6–3, 6–4.

== Seeds ==
Champion seeds are indicated in bold text while text in italics indicates the round in which those seeds were eliminated. The top four seeded teams received byes into the second round.

1. (United States) **Lori McNeil / (United States) Martina Navratilova (Champions)**
2. (Soviet Union) Larisa Neiland / (South Africa) Elna Reinach (quarterfinals)
3. (United States) Pam Shriver / (Australia) Elizabeth Smylie (final)
4. (United States) Katrina Adams / (Netherlands) Manon Bollegraf (quarterfinals)
5. (United States) Zina Garrison-Jackson / (France) Nathalie Tauziat (quarterfinals)
6. (South Africa) Amanda Coetzer / (Argentina) Inés Gorrochategui (second round)
7. (United States) Patty Fendick / (United States) Meredith McGrath (semifinals)
8. (Australia) Jo-Anne Faull / (New Zealand) Julie Richardson (first round)

== Draw ==
=== Key ===
- Q = Qualifier
- WC = Wild card
- LL = Lucky loser
- Alt = Alternate
- SE = Special exempt
- PR = Protected ranking
- ITF = ITF entry
- JE = Junior exempt
- w/o = Walkover
- r = Retired
- d = Defaulted
- SR = Special ranking

=== Finals ===
Semifinals

Final

1
- (United States) L McNeil
- (United States) M Navratilova
**6**
**6**

Q
- (United States) C Benjamin
- (Romania) R Dragomir
1
1

1
- (United States) L McNeil
- (United States) M Navratilova
**6**
**6**

3
- (United States) P Shriver
- (Australia) E Smylie
3
4

3
- (United States) P Shriver
- (Australia) E Smylie
**7^{7}**
**7^{8}**

7
- (United States) P Fendick
- (United States) McGrath
6^{4}
6^{6}

=== Top half ===
First round

Second round

Quarterfinals

Semifinals

1
- (United States) L McNeil
- (United States) M Navratilova
**6**
**6**

- (United States) B Nagelsen
- (South Africa) R Nideffer
4
3

- (Netherlands) M Oremans
- (Netherlands) C Vis
1
4

- (Netherlands) M Oremans
- (Netherlands) C Vis
**6**
**6**

1
- (United States) L McNeil
- (United States) M Navratilova
**7**
**6**

- (United States) J Emmons
- (Netherlands) M Kiene
4
3

WC
- (United Kingdom) V Lake
- (United Kingdom) C Wood
5
1

- (Japan) E Iida
- (Japan) M Kidowaki
**6**
**6**

- (Japan) E Iida
- (Japan) M Kidowaki
**6**
2
9

WC
- (United Kingdom) V Lake
- (United Kingdom) C Wood
**7^{7}**
**6**

WC
- (United Kingdom) V Lake
- (United Kingdom) C Wood
3
**6**
**11**

8
- (Australia) J-A Faull
- (New Zealand) J Richardson
6^{3}
4

1
- (United States) L McNeil
- (United States) M Navratilova
**6**
**6**

Q
- (United States) C Benjamin
- (Romania) R Dragomir
1
1

4
- (United States) K Adams
- (Netherlands) M Bollegraf
**7^{7}**
3
**6**

- (Australia) R McQuillan
- (Germany) C Porwik
4
2

- (Sweden) M Lindström
- (Sweden) M Strandlund
6^{5}
**6**
3

- (Sweden) M Lindström
- (Sweden) M Strandlund
**6**
**6**

4
- (United States) K Adams
- (Netherlands) M Bollegraf
6^{3}
**6**
5

Q
- (United States) C Benjamin
- (Romania) R Dragomir
**6**
**6**

Q
- (United States) C Benjamin
- (Romania) R Dragomir
**7^{7}**
2
**7**

WC
- (United Kingdom) A Grunfeld
- (United Kingdom) J Salmon
2
4

Q
- (United States) C Benjamin
- (Romania) R Dragomir
6^{3}
**6**
**6**

- (Peru) L Gildemeister
- (United States) C Rubin
2
**7^{7}**
1

6
- (South Africa) A Coetzer
- (Argentina) I Gorrochategui
**7^{7}**
4
2

6
- (South Africa) A Coetzer
- (Argentina) I Gorrochategui
**6**
6^{5}
**6**

=== Bottom half ===
First round

Second round

Quarterfinals

Semifinals

5
- (United States) Z Garrison-Jackson
- (France) N Tauziat
**6**
**6**

- (Australia) C Barclay
- (Australia) K-A Guse
1
3

5
- (United States) Z Garrison-Jackson
- (France) N Tauziat
**6**
**6**

- (Indonesia) Y Basuki
- (Japan) N Miyagi
4
3

- (United States) S McCarthy
- (United States) K Po
0
3

- (United States) S McCarthy
- (United States) K Po
**6**
**6**

5
- (United States) Z Garrison-Jackson
- (France) N Tauziat
3
5

- (Netherlands) I Driehuis
- (Mexico) L Novelo
**6**
3
**6**

3
- (United States) P Shriver
- (Australia) E Smylie
**6**
**7**

- (United States) E Burgin
- (United States) C MacGregor
2
**6**
4

- (Netherlands) I Driehuis
- (Mexico) L Novelo
1
0

3
- (United States) P Shriver
- (Australia) E Smylie
**6**
**6**

3
- (United States) P Shriver
- (Australia) E Smylie
**7^{7}**
**7^{8}**

7
- (United States) P Fendick
- (United States) M McGrath
**6**
**6**

7
- (United States) P Fendick
- (United States) M McGrath
6^{4}
6^{6}

- (United States) L Allen
- (United States) A Henricksson
3
4

7
- (United States) P Fendick
- (United States) M McGrath
**7^{7}**
**6**

- (United States) L Harvey-Wild
- (Australia) N Pratt
3
6^{4}

- (Italy) S Farina
- (Netherlands) N Muns-Jagerman
6^{4}
3

- (Italy) S Farina
- (Netherlands) N Muns-Jagerman
**6**
**7^{7}**

7
- (United States) P Fendick
- (United States) M McGrath
**7**
3
3

- (Ukraine) E Brioukhovets
- (Ukraine) N Medvedeva
2
4

2
- (Latvia) L Neiland
- (South Africa) E Reinach
5
**6**
**6**

- (Australia) M Jaggard-Lai
- (Australia) K Radford
**6**
**6**

- (Australia) M Jaggard-Lai
- (Australia) K Radford
5
2

2
- (Latvia) L Neiland
- (South Africa) E Reinach
**7**
**6**
