= 2007 DFS Classic – Singles =

Singles
- 2007 DFS Classic

Final
- Champion: (Serbia) Jelena Janković
- Runner-up: (Russia) Maria Sharapova
- Score: 4–6, 6–3, 7–5

Details
- Draw: 56 (8 Q / 4 WC )
- Seeds: 16

Events
Singles	Doubles
← 2006 ·	Birmingham Classic	· 2008 →

Vera Zvonareva was the defending champion, but chose not to participate this year.

Jelena Janković won the title, defeating Maria Sharapova in the final 4–6, 6–3, 7–5.

== Seeds ==
A champion seed is indicated in bold text while text in italics indicates the round in which that seed was eliminated. The top eight seeds received a bye to the second round.

1. (Russia) Maria Sharapova (final)
2. (Serbia) **Jelena Janković (champion)**
3. (Slovakia) Daniela Hantuchová (quarterfinals)
4. (China) Li Na (quarterfinals)
5. (France) Marion Bartoli (semifinals)
6. (Ukraine) Alona Bondarenko (quarterfinals)
7. (Japan) Ai Sugiyama (second round)
8. (Italy) Mara Santangelo (semifinals)
9. (Ukraine) Julia Vakulenko (third round)
10. (France) Séverine Brémond (first round)
11. (Russia) Olga Puchkova (first round)
12. (Poland) Agnieszka Radwańska (second round)
13. (United States) Meilen Tu (second round)
14. (Netherlands) Michaëlla Krajicek (first round)
15. (Greece) Eleni Daniilidou (third round)
16. (Russia) Maria Kirilenko (third round)

== Draw ==
=== Key ===
- Q = Qualifier
- WC = Wild card
- LL = Lucky loser
- Alt = Alternate
- ITF = ITF entry
- PR = Protected ranking
- SR = Special ranking
- SE = Special exempt
- JE = Junior exempt
- JR = Junior Accelerator Programme entrant
- CO = College Accelerator Programme entrant
- NG = Next Gen Accelerator Program entrant
- w/o = Walkover
- r = Retired
- d = Defaulted

=== Finals ===
Semifinals
1/WC	(Russia) **Maria Sharapova**	**7**	**6**
5	(France) Marion Bartoli	5	0
8	(Italy) Mara Santangelo	1	5
2	(Serbia) **Jelena Janković**	**6**	**7**

Final
1/WC	(Russia) Maria Sharapova	**6**	3	5
2	(Serbia) **Jelena Janković**	4	**6**	**7**

=== Top half ===
==== Section 1 ====
First round
(Uzbekistan) V Lepchenko	6^{7}	3
Q	(United States) **L Osterloh**	**7^{9}**	**6**
WC	(United Kingdom) A Keothavong	**6**	2	4
(Austria) **T Paszek**	2	**6**	**6**
(Italy) R Vinci	1	2
13	(United States) **M Tu**	**6**	**6**
12	(Poland) **A Radwańska**	**6**	**6**
(Luxembourg) A Kremer	1	3
(Russia) **E Likhovtseva**	**6**	**6**
(United States) B Mattek	3	0
(United States) J Craybas	4	1
Q	(Japan) **A Morita**	**6**	**6**

Second round
1/WC	(Russia) **M Sharapova**	**6**	**6**
Q	(United States) L Osterloh	4	0
(Austria) **T Paszek**	**6**	**7^{7}**
13	(United States) M Tu	2	6^{3}
12	(Poland) A Radwańska	5	6^{4}
(Russia) **E Likhovtseva**	**7**	**7^{7}**
Q	(Japan) **A Morita**	**6**	1	**6**
7	(Japan) A Sugiyama	4	**6**	2

Third round
1/WC	(Russia) **M Sharapova**	**6**	4	**6**
(Austria) T Paszek	3	**6**	2
(Russia) **E Likhovtseva**	**6**	**6**
Q	(Japan) A Morita	2	0

Quarterfinals
1/WC	(Russia) **M Sharapova**	**6**	**6**
(Russia) E Likhovtseva	2	3

==== Section 2 ====
First round
Q	(Belarus) **O Govortsova**	6^{9}	**6**	**7^{9}**
(Czech Republic) E Birnerová	**7^{11}**	4	6^{7}
Q	(China) Z Yan	2	2
(Australia) **C Dellacqua**	**6**	**6**
(United States) L Granville	3	6^{5}
15	(Greece) **E Daniilidou**	**6**	**7^{7}**
11	(Russia) O Puchkova	0	0
(Germany) **A Kerber**	**6**	**6**
(United States) A Spears	4	3
(United States) **A Rolle**	**6**	**6**
WC	(United Kingdom) **N Cavaday**	**6**	**6**
(Russia) V Bardina	2	1

Second round
3	(Slovakia) **D Hantuchová**	**6**	**6**
Q	(Belarus) O Govortsova	2	4
(Australia) C Dellacqua	4	4
15	(Greece) **E Daniilidou**	**6**	**6**
(Germany) **A Kerber**	**6**	**6**
(United States) A Rolle	4	1
WC	(United Kingdom) N Cavaday	3	1
5	(France) **M Bartoli**	**6**	**6**

Third round
3	(Slovakia) **D Hantuchová**	**7^{7}**	**6**
15	(Greece) E Daniilidou	6^{3}	4
(Germany) A Kerber	2	0
5	(France) **M Bartoli**	**6**	**6**

Quarterfinals
3	(Slovakia) D Hantuchová	**7**	4	5
5	(France) **M Bartoli**	5	**6**	**7**

=== Bottom half ===
==== Section 3 ====
First round
(India) **S Mirza**	**6**	**6**
(Italy) M E Camerin	3	3
Q	(Slovenia) **A Klepač**	**7**	2	**6**
(Russia) E Bychkova	5	**6**	3
(China) T Sun	2	1
9	(Ukraine) **J Vakulenko**	**6**	**6**
14	(Netherlands) M Krajicek	6^{5}	4
Q	(Ukraine) **Y Fedak**	**7^{7}**	**6**
WC	(United Kingdom) E Baltacha	4	**6**	5
(Venezuela) **M Sequera**	**6**	1	**7**
(Russia) **Y Shvedova**	4	**6**	**6**
(Ukraine) K Bondarenko	**6**	4	3

Second round
8	(Italy) **M Santangelo**	**6**	3	**7^{8}**
(India) S Mirza	3	**6**	6^{6}
Q	(Slovenia) A Klepač	4	**7^{7}**	3
9	(Ukraine) **J Vakulenko**	**6**	6^{5}	**6**
Q	(Ukraine) **Y Fedak**	3	**6**	**6**
(Venezuela) M Sequera	**6**	4	3
(Russia) Y Shvedova	**6**	2	0
4	(China) **N Li**	4	**6**	**6**

Third round
8	(Italy) **M Santangelo**	1
9	(Ukraine) J Vakulenko	3	r
Q	(Ukraine) Y Fedak	4	4
4	(China) **N Li**	**6**	**6**

Quarterfinals
8	(Italy) **M Santangelo**	**6**	**7**
4	(China) N Li	2	5

==== Section 4 ====
First round
(United States) J Jackson	3	1
(Chinese Taipei) **Y-j Chan**	**6**	**6**
Q	(Netherlands) B Schultz-McCarthy	6^{7}	6^{7}
(United States) **V King**	**7^{9}**	**7^{9}**
(Australia) **A Molik**	4	**6**	**6**
10	(France) S Brémond	**6**	3	4
16	(Russia) **M Kirilenko**	**6**	**6**
Q	(United States) R Kops-Jones	3	3
(France) **N Dechy**	**6**	4
(Italy) A Brianti	3	1	r
(Bulgaria) **T Pironkova**	4	**7^{7}**	**7^{7}**
(Canada) A Wozniak	**6**	6^{3}	6^{4}

Second round
6	(Ukraine) **A Bondarenko**	**6**	**6**
(Chinese Taipei) Y-j Chan	3	4
(United States) **V King**	**7^{12}**	**6**
(Australia) A Molik	6^{10}	4
16	(Russia) **M Kirilenko**	5	**6**	**6**
(France) N Dechy	**7**	2	0
(Bulgaria) T Pironkova	4	1
2	(Serbia) **J Janković**	**6**	**6**

Third round
6	(Ukraine) **A Bondarenko**	**6**	**6**
(United States) V King	1	3
16	(Russia) M Kirilenko	**6**	3	5
2	(Serbia) **J Janković**	3	**6**	**7**

Quarterfinals
6	(Ukraine) A Bondarenko	4	3
2	(Serbia) **J Janković**	**6**	**6**
