= 2007 DFS Classic – Doubles =

Doubles
- 2007 DFS Classic

Final
- Champions: (Chinese Taipei) Chan Yung-jan (Chinese Taipei) Chuang Chia-jung
- Runners-up: (China) Sun Tiantian (United States) Meilen Tu
- Score: 7–6 (7–3), 6–3

Events
Singles	Doubles
← 2006 ·	Birmingham Classic	· 2008 →

Jelena Janković and Li Na were the defending champions but lost in the first round to Ji Chunmei and Sun Shengnan.

Chan Yung-jan and Chuang Chia-jung won in the final 7–6^{(7–3)}, 6–3 against Sun Tiantian and Meilen Tu.

== Seeds ==
Champion seeds are indicated in bold text while text in italics indicates the round in which those seeds were eliminated.

1. (Zimbabwe) Cara Black / (South Africa) Liezel Huber (semifinals)
2. (Chinese Taipei) **Chan Yung-jan / (Chinese Taipei) Chuang Chia-jung (champions)**
3. (United States) Vania King / (China) Yan Zi (semifinals)
4. (Slovakia) Daniela Hantuchová / (India) Sania Mirza (first round)

== Draw ==
=== Key ===
- Q = Qualifier
- WC = Wild card
- LL = Lucky loser
- Alt = Alternate
- SE = Special exempt
- PR = Protected ranking
- ITF = ITF entry
- JE = Junior exempt
- w/o = Walkover
- r = Retired
- d = Defaulted
- SR = Special ranking

First round
1	(Zimbabwe) **C Black** (South Africa) **L Huber**	**6**	**6**
(Ukraine) A Bondarenko (Ukraine) K Bondarenko	2	4
WC	(United Kingdom) C Curran (United Kingdom) A Keothavong	4	3
(France) **S Brémond** (France) **N Dechy**	**6**	**6**
4	(Slovakia) D Hantuchová (India) S Mirza
(China) **T Sun** (United States) **M Tu**	w/o
Alt	(China) **C Ji** (China) **S Sun**	5	2
(Serbia) J Janković (China) N Li	**7**	0	r
(Ukraine) **Y Fedak** (Finland) **E Laine**	5
(Greece) E Daniilidou (Germany) J Wöhr	2	r
(Italy) M E Camerin (Italy) R Vinci	6^{5}	4
3	(United States) **V King** (China) **Z Yan**	**7^{7}**	**6**
(United States) L Granville (Czech Republic) V Uhlířová	4	**6**	4
(United States) **J Craybas** (Netherlands) **M Krajicek**	**6**	4	**6**
(United States) B Mattek (Australia) B Stewart	4	5
2	(Chinese Taipei) **Y-j Chan** (Chinese Taipei) **C-j Chuang**	**6**	**7**

Quarterfinals
1	(Zimbabwe) **C Black** (South Africa) **L Huber**	**6**	**7^{9}**
(France) S Brémond (France) N Dechy	4	6^{7}
(China) **T Sun** (United States) **M Tu**	**6**	**6**
ALT	(China) C Ji (China) S Sun	1	4
(Ukraine) Y Fedak (Finland) E Laine	4	4
3	(United States) **V King** (China) **Z Yan**	**6**	**6**
(United States) J Craybas (Netherlands) M Krajicek
2	(Chinese Taipei) **Y-j Chan** (Chinese Taipei) **C-j Chuang**	w/o

Semifinals
1	(Zimbabwe) C Black (South Africa) L Huber	6^{7}	3
(China) **T Sun** (United States) **M Tu**	**7^{9}**	**6**
3	(United States) V King (China) Z Yan	3	1
2	(Chinese Taipei) **Y-j Chan** (Chinese Taipei) **C-j Chuang**	**6**	**6**

Final
(China) Tiantian Sun (United States) Meilen Tu	6^{3}	3
2	(Chinese Taipei) **Yung-jan Chan** (Chinese Taipei) **Chia-jung Chuang**	**7^{7}**	**6**
