= 2008 DFS Classic – Singles =

Singles
- 2008 DFS Classic

Final
- Champion: (Ukraine) Kateryna Bondarenko
- Runner-up: (Belgium) Yanina Wickmayer
- Score: 7–6^{(9–7)}, 3–6, 7–6^{(7–4)}

Details
- Draw: 56 (8 Q / 4 WC )
- Seeds: 16

Events
Singles	Doubles
← 2007 ·	Birmingham Classic	· 2009 →

Jelena Janković was the defending champion, but chose not to participate this year.

Kateryna Bondarenko won her maiden WTA tour title, defeating Yanina Wickmayer in the final 7–6^{(9–7)}, 3–6, 7–6^{(7–4)}.

== Seeds ==
The top eight seeds receive a bye into the second round.

1. (France) Marion Bartoli (second round)
2. (Russia) Dinara Safina (withdrew due to a back injury)
3. (Czech Republic) Nicole Vaidišová (quarterfinals)
4. (Austria) Sybille Bammer (second round)
5. (Ukraine) Alona Bondarenko (quarterfinals)
6. (India) Sania Mirza (second round)
7. (Belarus) Olga Govortsova (second round)
8. (Netherlands) Michaëlla Krajicek (third round)
9. (Austria) Tamira Paszek (second round)
10. (Uzbekistan) Akgul Amanmuradova (first round)
11. (Australia) Casey Dellacqua (second round)
12. (Ukraine) Kateryna Bondarenko (champion)
13. (France) Aravane Rezaï (second round)
14. (United States) Jill Craybas (first round)
15. (Russia) Ekaterina Makarova (third round)
16. (Russia) Anastasia Rodionova (first round)
17. (Japan) Aiko Nakamura (third round)

== Draw ==
=== Key ===
- Q = Qualifier
- WC = Wild card
- LL = Lucky loser
- Alt = Alternate
- ITF = ITF entry
- PR = Protected ranking
- SR = Special ranking
- SE = Special exempt
- JE = Junior exempt
- JR = Junior Accelerator Programme entrant
- CO = College Accelerator Programme entrant
- NG = Next Gen Accelerator Program entrant
- w/o = Walkover
- r = Retired
- d = Defaulted

=== Finals ===
Quarterfinals
(Czech Republic) Petra Cetkovská	6^{3}	2
12	(Ukraine) Kateryna Bondarenko	7^{7}	6
5	(Ukraine) Alona Bondarenko	4	5
(New Zealand) Marina Erakovic	6	7
(Belgium) Yanina Wickmayer	6	6
WC	(United Kingdom) Melanie South	4	3
(United States) Bethanie Mattek	6	6
3	(Czech Republic) Nicole Vaidišová	3	0

Semifinals
12	(Ukraine) Kateryna Bondarenko	6	6
(New Zealand) Marina Erakovic	3	2
(Belgium) Yanina Wickmayer	7	7
(United States) Bethanie Mattek	5	6^{2}

Final
12	(Ukraine) Kateryna Bondarenko	7^{9}	3	7^{7}
(Belgium) Yanina Wickmayer	6^{7}	6	6^{4}

=== Top half ===
==== Section 1 ====
First round
(China) M Yuan	2	1
(Czech Republic) P Cetkovská	6	6
(Poland) M Domachowska	6	6
Q	(Estonia) M Rüütel	4	4
(France) C Pin	7	7^{7}
16	(Russia) A Rodionova	5	6^{2}
12	(Ukraine) K Bondarenko	6	6
(United Kingdom) A Keothavong	3	2
Q	(Australia) S Stosur	6	6
(Germany) S Lisicki	3	4
(United States) V King	2	6^{4}
LL	(Hungary) M Czink	6	7^{7}

Second round
1	(France) M Bartoli	7	4	0
(Czech Republic) P Cetkovská	5	6	6
(Poland) M Domachowska	2	4
(France) C Pin	6	6
12	(Ukraine) K Bondarenko	6	6
Q	(Australia) S Stosur	3	2
LL	(Hungary) M Czink	6	7^{8}
7	(Belarus) O Govortsova	3	6^{6}

Third round
(Czech Republic) P Cetkovská	6	6^{5}	6
(France) C Pin	4	7^{7}	3
12	(Ukraine) K Bondarenko	4	6	7
LL	(Hungary) M Czink	6	4	5

Quarterfinals
(Czech Republic) P Cetkovská	6^{3}	2
12	(Ukraine) K Bondarenko	7^{7}	6

==== Section 2 ====
First round
(Spain) V Ruano Pascual	6	6^{3}	6
(Venezuela) M Sequera	3	7^{7}	1
Q	(United States) S Rao	7^{10}	6
(Czech Republic) P Kvitová	6^{8}	4
WC	(United Kingdom) N Cavaday	6	6
14	(United States) J Craybas	0	4
10	(Uzbekistan) A Amanmuradova	3	1
Q	(Russia) Y Shvedova	6	6
(Russia) A Kudryavtseva	0	6	6^{2}
(United Kingdom) K O'Brien	6	3	7^{7}
(Canada) S Dubois	4	4
(New Zealand) M Erakovic	6	6

Second round
5	(Ukraine) A Bondarenko	7^{7}	3	7
(Spain) V Ruano Pascual	6^{4}	6	5
Q	(United States) S Rao	4	6	6
WC	(United Kingdom) N Cavaday	6	3	1
Q	(Russia) Y Shvedova	7	1	7
(United Kingdom) K O'Brien	5	6	5
(New Zealand) M Erakovic	6	6
6	(India) S Mirza	3	0

Third round
5	(Ukraine) A Bondarenko	3	7	6
Q	(United States) S Rao	6	5	1
Q	(Russia) Y Shvedova	3	5
(New Zealand) M Erakovic	6	7

Quarterfinals
5	(Ukraine) A Bondarenko	4	5
(New Zealand) M Erakovic	6	7

=== Bottom half ===
==== Section 3 ====
First round
Q	(Belarus) T Poutchek	6	7^{8}
(Romania) IR Olaru	0	6^{6}
Q	(France) Y Fedossova	1	4
(Belgium) Y Wickmayer	6	6
(United States) J Ditty	6^{5}	2
11	(Australia) C Dellacqua	7^{7}	6
17	(Japan) A Nakamura	7	6
(Israel) T Obziler	5	3
(Romania) S Cîrstea	6	6
(Japan) A Morita	2	0
WC	(United Kingdom) M South	6	6
WC	(United Kingdom) A Fitzpatrick	4	4

Second round
8	(Netherlands) M Krajicek	6	6
Q	(Belarus) T Poutchek	2	1
(Belgium) Y Wickmayer	6	3	6
11	(Australia) C Dellacqua	2	6	3
17	(Japan) A Nakamura	6	4	6
(Romania) S Cîrstea	4	6	4
WC	(United Kingdom) M South	6	7
4	(Austria) S Bammer	3	5

Third round
8	(Netherlands) M Krajicek	3	4
(Belgium) Y Wickmayer	6	6
17	(Japan) A Nakamura	6	4	4
WC	(United Kingdom) M South	2	6	6

Quarterfinals
(Belgium) Y Wickmayer	6	6
WC	(United Kingdom) M South	4	3

==== Section 4 ====
First round
(Romania) M Niculescu	3	4
(Thailand) T Tanasugarn	6	6
Q	(Slovakia) J Gajdošová	6^{1}	2
(United States) B Mattek	7^{7}	6
Q	(United Kingdom) A Elliott	3	6	6^{6}
13	(France) A Rezaï	6	2	7^{8}
15	(Russia) E Makarova	7	7^{7}
WC	(United Kingdom) E Baltacha	5	6^{1}
(Russia) O Puchkova	4	3
(Germany) A Kerber	6	6
(France) S Brémond	5	2
(France) N Dechy	7	6

Second round
9	(Austria) T Paszek	1	0
(Thailand) T Tanasugarn	6	6
(United States) B Mattek	6	6
13	(France) A Rezaï	1	4
15	(Russia) E Makarova	6^{3}	7	7
(Germany) A Kerber	7^{7}	5	5
(France) N Dechy	1	3
3	(Czech Republic) N Vaidišová	6	6

Third round
(Thailand) T Tanasugarn	4	2
(United States) B Mattek	6	6
15	(Russia) E Makarova	7^{7}	2	4
3	(Czech Republic) N Vaidišová	6^{5}	6	6

Quarterfinals
(United States) B Mattek	6	6
3	(Czech Republic) N Vaidišová	3	0
