= 1991 Dow Classic – Doubles =

Doubles
- 1991 Dow Classic
- 1990 Champions: (Soviet Union) Larisa Savchenko-Neiland (Soviet Union) Natasha Zvereva

Final
- Champions: (Australia) Nicole Provis (Australia) Elizabeth Smylie
- Runners-up: (United States) Sandy Collins (South Africa) Elna Reinach
- Score: 6–3, 6–4

Details
- Draw: 28
- Seeds: 8

Events
Singles	Doubles
← 1990 ·	Birmingham Classic	· 1992 →

Larisa Savchenko-Neiland and Natasha Zvereva were the defending champions but were defeated in the quarterfinals by Sandy Collins and Elna Reinach.

Collins and Reinach were defeated in the final by Nicole Provis and Elizabeth Smylie, 6–3, 6–4.

== Seeds ==
Champion seeds are indicated in bold text while text in italics indicates the round in which those seeds were eliminated. The top four seeded teams received byes into the second round.

1. (Soviet Union) Larisa Savchenko-Neiland / (Soviet Union) Natasha Zvereva (quarterfinals)
2. **(Australia) Nicole Provis / (Australia) Elizabeth Smylie (Champions)**
3. (United States) Kathy Jordan / (United States) Lori McNeil (withdrew)
4. (South Africa) Lise Gregory / (United States) Gretchen Magers (semifinals)
5. (United States) Elise Burgin / (United States) Patty Fendick (second round)
6. (Canada) Jill Hetherington / (United States) Kathy Rinaldi (first round)
7. (United States) Katrina Adams / (Netherlands) Manon Bollegraf (second round)
8. (United States) Sandy Collins / (South Africa) Elna Reinach (final)

== Draw ==
=== Key ===
- Q = Qualifier
- WC = Wild card
- LL = Lucky loser
- Alt = Alternate
- SE = Special exempt
- PR = Protected ranking
- ITF = ITF entry
- JE = Junior exempt
- w/o = Walkover
- r = Retired
- d = Defaulted
- SR = Special ranking

=== Finals ===
Semifinals
8	**(United States) S Collins** **(South Africa) E Reinach**	**7^{2}**	**6**
4	(South Africa) L Gregory (United States) G Magers	6^{8}	4
(Australia) J-A Faull (Australia) L Field	1	3
2	**(Australia) N Provis** **(Australia) E Smylie**	**6**	**6**

Final
8	(United States) S Collins (South Africa) E Reinach	3	4
2	**(Australia) N Provis** **(Australia) E Smylie**	**6**	**6**

=== Top half ===
First round
**(France) I Demongeot** **(United Kingdom) J Durie**	**6**	**6**
(South Africa) L Barnard (United States) A Henricksson	1	4
**(United States) Z Garrison-Jackson** **(United States) C Rubin**	4	**6**	**6**
(United Kingdom) K Hand (United Kingdom) J Salmon	**6**	3	3
(Japan) E Iida (Japan) N Miyagi	1	4
8	**(United States) S Collins** **(South Africa) E Reinach**	**6**	**6**
(United States) C Benjamin (United States) T Whittington	**6**	4	5
**(Japan) K Date** **(United States) C MacGregor**	4	**6**	**7**
Q	**(Sweden) M Lindström** **(United States) H Ludloff**	**6**	4	**6**
(Netherlands) I Driehuis (Poland) B Schultz	3	**6**	4
**(United States) R Baranski** **(Australia) T Morton**	5	**6**	**9**
6	(Canada) J Hetherington (United States) K Rinaldi	**7**	3	7

Second round
1	**(Soviet Union) L Savchenko-Neiland** **(Soviet Union) N Zvereva**	**6**	**6**
(France) I Demongeot (United Kingdom) J Durie	4	4
(United States) Z Garrison-Jackson (United States) C Rubin	**7**	6^{5}	3
8	**(United States) S Collins** **(South Africa) E Reinach**	5	**7^{7}**	**7**
4	**(South Africa) L Gregory** **(United States) G Magers**	**6**	**7^{7}**
(Japan) K Date (United States) C MacGregor	2	6^{3}
Q	**(Sweden) M Lindström** **(United States) H Ludloff**	**6**	**6**
(United States) R Baranski (Australia) T Morton	3	3

Quarterfinals
1	(Soviet Union) L Savchenko-Neiland (Soviet Union) N Zvereva	6^{8}	**6**	3
8	**(United States) S Collins** **(South Africa) E Reinach**	**7^{10}**	3	**6**
4	**(South Africa) L Gregory** **(United States) G Magers**	**6**	**6**
Q	(Sweden) M Lindström (United States) H Ludloff	2	4

Semifinals
8	**(United States) S Collins** **(South Africa) E Reinach**	**7^{7}**	**6**
(South Africa) L Gregory (United States) G Magers	6^{2}	4

=== Bottom half ===
First round
5	**(United States) E Burgin** **(United States) P Fendick**	**7**	**6**
(Italy) L Golarsa (France) N Tauziat	5	2
**(Australia) J-A Faull** **(Australia) L Field**	**7^{9}**	**6**
(West Germany) E Pfaff (Australia) R Stubbs	6^{7}	1
(France) P Paradis-Mangon (Australia) A Scott	**7^{8}**	3	8
**(Australia) K Godridge** **(Australia) N Pratt**	6^{6}	**6**	**10**
7	**(United States) K Adams** **(Netherlands) M Bollegraf**	4	**7^{7}**	**6**
(New Zealand) B Cordwell (Sweden) C Lindqvist	**6**	6^{3}	4
**(United States) S Rehe** **(Hungary) A Temesvári-Trunkos**	**6**	**6**
(Netherlands) C Bakkum (Netherlands) N Jagerman	1	3
(Indonesia) Y Basuki (Indonesia) S Wibowo	1	4
**(Australia) M Jaggard** **(France) C Suire**	**6**	**6**

Second round
5	(United States) E Burgin (United States) P Fendick	3	**6**	2
**(Australia) J-A Faull** **(Australia) L Field**	**6**	3	**6**
(Australia) K Godridge (Australia) N Pratt	4	**6**	2
Alt	**(United States) D Faber** **(Australia) K-A Guse**	**6**	4	**6**
7	(United States) K Adams (Netherlands) M Bollegraf	5	6^{4}
**(United States) S Rehe** **(Hungary) A Temesvári-Trunkos**	**7**	**7^{7}**
(Australia) M Jaggard (France) C Suire	2	2
2	**(Australia) N Provis** **(Australia) E Smylie**	**6**	**6**

Quarterfinals
**(Australia) J-A Faull** **(Australia) L Field**	**6**	**6**
Alt	(United States) D Faber (Australia) K-A Guse	4	2
(United States) S Rehe (Hungary) A Temesvári-Trunkos	3	4
2	**(Australia) N Provis** **(Australia) E Smylie**	**6**	**6**

Semifinals
(Australia) J-A Faull (Australia) L Field	1	3
2	**(Australia) N Provis** **(Australia) E Smylie**	**6**	**6**
