= 2006 DFS Classic – Singles =

Tennis tournament

Singles
- 2006 DFS Classic

Final
- Champion: (Russia) Vera Zvonareva
- Runner-up: (United States) Jamea Jackson
- Score: 7–6^{(14–12)}, 7–6^{(7–5)}

Details
- Draw: 56 (8 Q / 4 WC )
- Seeds: 16

Events
Singles	Doubles
← 2005 ·	Birmingham Classic	· 2007 →

Maria Sharapova was the two-time defending champion, but lost in the semifinals to Jamea Jackson.

Vera Zvonareva won the title, defeating Jackson in the final 7–6^{(14–12)}, 7–6^{(7–5)}.

== Seeds ==
A champion seed is indicated in bold text while text in italics indicates the round in which that seed was eliminated. The top eight seeds received a bye to the second round.

1. (Russia) Maria Sharapova (semifinals)
2. (Italy) Francesca Schiavone (quarterfinals)
3. (Slovakia) Daniela Hantuchová (withdrew)
4. (Russia) Elena Likhovtseva (quarterfinals)
5. (Japan) Ai Sugiyama (third round)
6. (France) Marion Bartoli (quarterfinals)
7. (Russia) Anna Chakvetadze (third round)
8. (Serbia and Montenegro) Jelena Janković (third round)
9. (Sweden) Sofia Arvidsson (second round)
10. (Czech Republic) Klára Koukalová (first round)
11. (Colombia) Catalina Castaño (first round)
12. (Italy) Mara Santangelo (quarterfinals)
13. (China) Li Na (third round)
14. (India) Sania Mirza (third round)
15. (Australia) Samantha Stosur (second round)
16. (United States) Laura Granville (first round)

== Draw ==
=== Key ===
- Q = Qualifier
- WC = Wild card
- LL = Lucky loser
- Alt = Alternate
- ITF = ITF entry
- PR = Protected ranking
- SR = Special ranking
- SE = Special exempt
- JE = Junior exempt
- JR = Junior Accelerator Programme entrant
- CO = College Accelerator Programme entrant
- NG = Next Gen Accelerator Program entrant
- w/o = Walkover
- r = Retired
- d = Defaulted

=== Finals ===
Semifinals
1	(Russia) Maria Sharapova	4	4
(United States) **Jamea Jackson**	**6**	**6**
Q	(United States) Meilen Tu	**7**	4	3
(Russia) **Vera Zvonareva**	5	**6**	**6**

Final
(United States) Jamea Jackson	6^{12}	6^{5}
(Russia) **Vera Zvonareva**	**7^{14}**	**7^{7}**

=== Top half ===
==== Section 1 ====
First round
(France) S Foretz	2	6^{3}
Q	(United States) **A Rolle**	**6**	**7^{7}**
(Greece) **E Daniilidou**	**6**	**6**
WC	(United Kingdom) A Keothavong	3	0
(United States) M Washington	3	3
13	(China) **N Li**	**6**	**6**
12	(Italy) **M Santangelo**	**6**	**6**
(Finland) E Laine	1	2
(Russia) **E Vesnina**	**6**	3	**6**
(France) V Razzano	3	**6**	0
(Slovakia) **J Gajdošová**	**6**	**6**
(China) M Yuan	3	4

Second round
1	(Russia) **M Sharapova**	**6**	**6**
Q	(United States) A Rolle	4	2
(Greece) E Daniilidou	6^{7}	3
13	(China) **N Li**	**7^{9}**	**6**
12	(Italy) **M Santangelo**	**6**	**6**
(Russia) E Vesnina	3	3
(Slovakia) J Gajdošová	2	3
5	(Japan) **A Sugiyama**	**6**	**6**

Third round
1	(Russia) **M Sharapova**	**6**	**6**
13	(China) N Li	2	4
12	(Italy) **M Santangelo**	**7^{7}**	**6**
5	(Japan) A Sugiyama	6^{4}	4

Quarterfinals
1	(Russia) **M Sharapova**	**6**	**6**
12	(Italy) M Santangelo	2	2

==== Section 2 ====
First round
Q	(Russia) **O Puchkova**	2	**6**	**6**
Q	(Ukraine) V Kutuzova	**6**	2	3
(United States) **L Raymond**	**7**	**6**
(Japan) A Morigami	5	3
Q	(Russia) A Rodionova	2	**6**	4
15	(Australia) **S Stosur**	**6**	3	**6**
10	(Czech Republic) K Koukalová	4	1
(United States) **J Jackson**	**6**	**6**
WC	(United Kingdom) M South	6^{3}	**6**	3
WC	(United Kingdom) **S Borwell**	**7^{7}**	3	**6**
(China) **S Peng**	2	**7**	**6**
Q	(Australia) N Pratt	**6**	5	4

Second round
4	(Russia) **E Likhovtseva**	**6**	**6**
Q	(Russia) O Puchkova	2	2
(United States) **L Raymond**	4	**6**	**7^{7}**
15	(Australia) S Stosur	**6**	1	6^{0}
(United States) **J Jackson**	**6**	**7^{7}**
WC	(United Kingdom) S Borwell	2	6^{5}
(China) S Peng	2	1
8	(Serbia and Montenegro) **J Janković**	**6**	**6**

Third round
4	(Russia) **E Likhovtseva**	**7**	**6**
(United States) L Raymond	5	4
(United States) **J Jackson**	**6**	0	**7**
8	(Serbia and Montenegro) J Janković	4	**6**	5

Quarterfinals
4	(Russia) E Likhovtseva	4	3
(United States) **J Jackson**	**6**	**6**

=== Bottom half ===
==== Section 3 ====
First round
LL	(United States) **B Mattek**	**6**	6^{6}	**6**
(Germany) J Schruff	4	**7^{8}**	1
(Japan) **A Morita**	**6**	2	**6**
WC	(United Kingdom) K O'Brien	4	**6**	1
Q	(Hungary) M Czink	6^{5}	**6**	3
9	(Sweden) **S Arvidsson**	**7^{7}**	4	**6**
14	(India) **S Mirza**	**6**	3	**6**
(Ukraine) A Bondarenko	2	**6**	3
(United States) **S Perry**	**6**	**6**
(United States) J Craybas	3	3
Q	(United States) **M Tu**	**6**	**7^{8}**
(Puerto Rico) K Brandi	3	6^{6}

Second round
6	(France) **M Bartoli**	4	**6**	**6**
LL	(United States) B Mattek	**6**	4	4
(Japan) **A Morita**	**6**	**6**
9	(Sweden) S Arvidsson	4	3
14	(India) **S Mirza**	**7**	6^{7}	**6**
(United States) S Perry	5	**7^{9}**	3
Q	(United States) **M Tu**	**6**	**7^{8}**
LL	(United States) L Osterloh	0	6^{6}

Third round
6	(France) **M Bartoli**	**6**	5	**6**
(Japan) A Morita	4	**7**	2
14	(India) S Mirza	**6**	4	6^{3}
Q	(United States) **M Tu**	2	**6**	**7^{7}**

Quarterfinals
6	(France) M Bartoli	4	4
Q	(United States) **M Tu**	**6**	**6**

==== Section 4 ====
First round
Q	(Switzerland) **E Gagliardi**	**6**	**6**
(Japan) A Nakamura	3	3
LL	(Luxembourg) A Kremer	0	1
(Russia) **V Zvonareva**	**6**	**6**
(Slovakia) **M Suchá**	**6**	**6**
11	(Colombia) C Castaño	3	1
16	(United States) L Granville	4	4
(China) **Z Yan**	**6**	**6**
(Tunisia) S Sfar	4	5
(Bulgaria) **T Pironkova**	**6**	**7**
(Italy) A Serra Zanetti	2	5
(Venezuela) **M Vento-Kabchi**	**6**	**7**

Second round
7	(Russia) **A Chakvetadze**	**6**	**6**
Q	(Switzerland) E Gagliardi	4	4
(Russia) **V Zvonareva**	**6**	**6**
(Slovakia) M Suchá	1	2
(China) Z Yan	5	5
(Bulgaria) **T Pironkova**	**7**	**7**
(Venezuela) M Vento-Kabchi	0	**6**	1
2	(Italy) **F Schiavone**	**6**	4	**6**

Third round
7	(Russia) A Chakvetadze	4	3
(Russia) **V Zvonareva**	**6**	**6**
(Bulgaria) T Pironkova	**6**	3	1
2	(Italy) **F Schiavone**	3	**6**	**6**

Quarterfinals
(Russia) **V Zvonareva**	**6**	3	**6**
2	(Italy) F Schiavone	4	**6**	1
