= 2006 DFS Classic – Doubles =

Doubles
- 2006 DFS Classic

Final
- Champions: (Serbia and Montenegro) Jelena Janković (China) Li Na
- Runners-up: (United States) Jill Craybas (South Africa) Liezel Huber
- Score: 6–2, 6–4

Events
Singles	Doubles
← 2005 ·	Birmingham Classic	· 2007 →

Daniela Hantuchová and Ai Sugiyama were the defending champions but did not compete that year.

Jelena Janković and Li Na won in the final 6–2, 6–4 against Jill Craybas and Liezel Huber.

== Seeds ==
1. (Zimbabwe) Cara Black / (Australia) Rennae Stubbs (quarterfinals)
2. (China) Li Ting / (China) Sun Tiantian (quarterfinals)
3. (India) Sania Mirza / (Italy) Francesca Schiavone (first round)
4. (Australia) Nicole Pratt / (Australia) Bryanne Stewart (quarterfinals)

== Draw ==
=== Key ===
- Q = Qualifier
- WC = Wild card
- LL = Lucky loser
- Alt = Alternate
- SE = Special exempt
- PR = Protected ranking
- ITF = ITF entry
- JE = Junior exempt
- w/o = Walkover
- r = Retired
- d = Defaulted
- SR = Special ranking

=== Main draw ===
First round
1	(Zimbabwe) C Black (South Africa) L Huber	6	6
Q	(Chinese Taipei) S-w Hsieh (Belarus) T Poutchek	0	3
(United States) B Mattek (United States) M Washington	1	6	6
(Czech Republic) V Uhlířová (Kazakhstan) G Voskoboeva	6	4	3
4	(Australia) N Pratt (Australia) B Stewart	w/o
(Greece) E Daniilidou (Italy) M Santangelo
WC	(Serbia and Montenegro) J Janković (China) N Li	6	6
WC	(United Kingdom) C Curran (United States) L Granville	2	3
(China) S Peng (United States) M Tu	6	6
(Tunisia) S Sfar (Germany) J Wöhr	2	4
(Russia) E Vesnina (China) Z Yan	4	6	6
3	(India) S Mirza (Italy) F Schiavone	6	2	2
(Ukraine) T Perebiynis (Russia) A Rodionova	4	6^{4}
(United States) J Craybas (South Africa) L Huber	6	7^{7}
(Argentina) M E Salerni (Venezuela) M Vento-Kabchi	6^{2}	3
2	(China) T Li (China) T Sun	7^{7}	6

Quarterfinals
1	(Zimbabwe) C Black (Australia) R Stubbs	6	5	5
(United States) B Mattek (United States) M Washington	3	7	7
4	(Australia) N Pratt (Australia) B Stewart	7^{7}	6^{8}	1
WC	(Serbia and Montenegro) J Janković (China) N Li	6^{2}	7^{10}	6
(China) S Peng (United States) M Tu	6	6
(Russia) E Vesnina (China) Z Yan	3	1
(United States) J Craybas (South Africa) L Huber	6	3	6
2	(China) T Li (China) T Sun	4	6	2

Semifinals
(United States) B Mattek (United States) M Washington	3	4
WC	(Serbia and Montenegro) J Janković (China) N Li	6	6
(China) S Peng (United States) M Tu	0	r
(United States) J Craybas (South Africa) L Huber	3

Final
WC	(Serbia and Montenegro) Jelena Janković (China) Li Na	6	6
(United States) Jill Craybas (South Africa) Liezel Huber	2	4

=== Qualifying draw ===
First qualifying round			Final qualifying round
1	(France) S Foretz (Italy) A Serra Zanetti	4
WC	(United Kingdom) A Keothavong (Japan) A Nakamura	8	WC	(United Kingdom) A Keothavong (Japan) A Nakamura	0	3
	(Brazil) M F Alves (South Africa) N Grandin	3	2	(Chinese Taipei) S-W Hsieh (Belarus) T Poutchek	6	6
2	(Chinese Taipei) S-W Hsieh (Belarus) T Poutchek	8
