= 1991 Dow Classic – Singles =

Singles
- 1991 Dow Classic
- 1990 Champion: (United States) Zina Garrison

Final
- Champion: (United States) Martina Navratilova
- Runner-up: (Soviet Union) Natalia Zvereva
- Score: 6–4, 7–6^{(8–6)}

Details
- Draw: 56
- Seeds: 16

Events
Singles	Doubles
← 1990 ·	Birmingham Classic	· 1992 →

Zina Garrison was the defending champion but lost in the semifinals to Natalia Zvereva.

Martina Navratilova won in the final against Zvereva, 6–4, 7–6^{(8–6)}.

== Seeds ==
The top eight seeds receive a bye into the second round.

1. (United States) Martina Navratilova (Champion)
2. (United States) Zina Garrison (semifinals)
3. (France) Nathalie Tauziat (third round)
4. (Soviet Union) Natalia Zvereva (final)
5. (United States) Lori McNeil (quarterfinals)
6. (United States) Meredith McGrath (second round)
7. (Japan) Naoko Sawamatsu (second round)
8. (Netherlands) Manon Bollegraf (quarterfinals)
9. (United States) Gretchen Magers (third round)
10. (West Germany) Claudia Kohde-Kilsch (first round)
11. (Sweden) Catarina Lindqvist (second round)
12. (United States) Ginger Helgeson (withdrew)
13. (Australia) Anne Minter (second round)
14. (United States) Stephanie Rehe (first round)
15. (Japan) Akiko Kijimuta (first round)
16. (United States) Pam Shriver (third round)

== Draw ==
=== Key ===
- Q = Qualifier
- WC = Wild card
- LL = Lucky loser
- Alt = Alternate
- SE = Special exempt
- PR = Protected ranking
- ITF = ITF entry
- JE = Junior exempt
- w/o = Walkover
- r = Retired
- d = Defaulted
- SR = Special ranking

=== Finals ===
Quarterfinals
1	(United States) Martina Navratilova	6	6
5	(United States) Lori McNeil	3	2
(Netherlands) Brenda Schultz	6	6
LL	(France) Catherine Suire	3	2
8	(Netherlands) Manon Bollegraf	4	7^{7}	2
4	(Soviet Union) Natalia Zvereva	6	6^{5}	6
(South Africa) Mariaan de Swardt	3	4
2	(United States) Zina Garrison	6	6

Semifinals
1	(United States) Martina Navratilova	6	6
(Netherlands) Brenda Schultz	3	2
4	(Soviet Union) Natalia Zvereva	2	7^{7}	8
2	(United States) Zina Garrison	6	6^{4}	6

Final
1	(United States) Martina Navratilova	6	7^{8}
4	(Soviet Union) Natalia Zvereva	4	6^{6}

=== Top half ===
==== Section 1 ====
First round
(United Kingdom) J Durie	6	3	3
(Indonesia) Y Basuki	4	6	6
(Japan) N Miyagi	6^{1}	4
(Japan) M Kidowaki	7^{7}	6
Q	(United States) S Collins	3	2
13	(Australia) A Minter	6	6
15	(Japan) A Kijimuta	6^{5}	3
(United Kingdom) C Wood	7^{7}	6
(United States) B Nagelsen	2	6	4
(United States) A Henricksson	6	3	6
(West Germany) E Pfaff	3	4
Q	(Australia) R Stubbs	6	6

Second round
1	(United States) M Navratilova	6	6
(Indonesia) Y Basuki	2	3
(Japan) M Kidowaki	7^{8}	7^{8}
13	(Australia) A Minter	6^{6}	6^{6}
(United Kingdom) C Wood	7^{7}	1	4
(United States) A Henricksson	6^{4}	6	6
Q	(Australia) R Stubbs	6	5	2
5	(United States) L McNeil	4	7	6

Third round
1	(United States) M Navratilova	6	6
(Japan) M Kidowaki	0	2
(United States) A Henricksson	2	3
5	(United States) L McNeil	6	6

Quarterfinals
1	(United States) M Navratilova	6	6
5	(United States) L McNeil	3	2

==== Section 2 ====
First round
(South Africa) E Reinach	7^{7}	5	6
(Italy) L Golarsa	6^{4}	7	3
(Hungary) A Temesvári-Trunkos	6	6
(United Kingdom) S Loosemore	4	4
(Netherlands) B Schultz	6	6
10	(West Germany) C Kohde-Kilsch	4	1
LL	(France) C Suire	6	7^{7}
(Australia) L Field	3	6^{1}
(Australia) K Godridge	6	6
(France) N van Lottum	2	4
(United States) R Baranski	2	4
(New Zealand) B Cordwell	6	6

Second round
3	(France) N Tauziat	6^{5}	6	6
(South Africa) E Reinach	7^{7}	4	4
(Hungary) A Temesvári-Trunkos	6^{6}	2
(Netherlands) B Schultz	7^{8}	6
LL	(France) C Suire	6	3	6
(Australia) K Godridge	4	6	2
(New Zealand) B Cordwell	6	6
7	(Japan) N Sawamatsu	2	4

Third round
3	(France) N Tauziat	3	5
(Netherlands) B Schultz	6	7
LL	(France) C Suire	6	7^{7}
(New Zealand) B Cordwell	2	6^{4}

Quarterfinals
(Netherlands) B Schultz	6	6
LL	(France) C Suire	3	2

=== Bottom half ===
==== Section 3 ====
First round
(Australia) E Smylie	6	6
(United States) D Faber	2	3
Q	(Australia) M Jaggard	6	7^{7}
(United States) S Martin	4	6^{4}
(United Kingdom) J Salmon	0	4
16	(United States) P Shriver	6	6
14	(United States) S Rehe	4	6	5
(Japan) K Date	6	2	7
(Japan) T Takagi	6	6^{7}	6
Q	(Australia) J-A Faull	0	7^{9}	2
Q	(United States) C MacGregor	5	6	6
(United Kingdom) A Grunfeld	7	4	4

Second round
8	(Netherlands) M Bollegraf	4	6	8
(Australia) E Smylie	6	2	6
Q	(Australia) M Jaggard	3	4
16	(United States) P Shriver	6	6
(Japan) K Date	7^{7}	2	6
(Japan) T Takagi	6^{2}	6	2
Q	(United States) C MacGregor	7^{9}	6^{3}	4
4	(Soviet Union) N Zvereva	6^{7}	7^{7}	6

Third round
8	(Netherlands) M Bollegraf	6	6
16	(United States) P Shriver	4	3
(Japan) K Date	3	1
4	(Soviet Union) N Zvereva	6	6

Quarterfinals
8	(Netherlands) M Bollegraf	4	7^{7}	2
4	(Soviet Union) N Zvereva	6	6^{5}	6

==== Section 4 ====
First round
(Netherlands) N Jagerman	4	1
(South Africa) M de Swardt	6	6
(Sweden) C Dahlman	4	6	1
Q	(United States) K Adams	6	4	6
Q	(Sweden) M Lindström	4	4
9	(United States) G Magers	6	6
11	(Sweden) C Lindqvist	6	7
(United Kingdom) B Griffiths	3	5
Q	(Indonesia) S Wibowo	0	1
(United Kingdom) S Gomer	6	6
(France) P Paradis-Mangon	6	4	6
LL	(Netherlands) M Oremans	2	6	3

Second round
6	(United States) M McGrath	6^{5}	0
(South Africa) M de Swardt	7^{7}	6
Q	(United States) K Adams	2	2
9	(United States) G Magers	6	6
11	(Sweden) C Lindqvist	6	2	1
(United Kingdom) S Gomer	2	6	6
(France) P Paradis-Mangon	4	3
2	(United States) Z Garrison	6	6

Third round
(South Africa) M de Swardt	6	6
9	(United States) G Magers	3	4
(United Kingdom) S Gomer	6	2	4
2	(United States) Z Garrison	4	6	6

Quarterfinals
(South Africa) M de Swardt	3	4
2	(United States) Z Garrison	6	6
