= 2008 DFS Classic – Doubles =

Doubles
- 2008 DFS Classic

Final
- Champions: (Zimbabwe) Cara Black (United States) Liezel Huber
- Runners-up: (France) Séverine Brémond (Spain) Virginia Ruano Pascual
- Score: 6–2, 6–1

Events
Singles	Doubles
← 2007 ·	Birmingham Classic	· 2009 →

Chan Yung-jan and Chuang Chia-jung were the defending champions, but Chan chose not to participate, and only Chuang competed that year.

Chuang partnered with Rika Fujiwara, but lost in the quarterfinals to Vania King and Alla Kudryavtseva.

Cara Black and Liezel Huber won in the final 6–2, 6–1, against Séverine Brémond and Virginia Ruano Pascual.

== Seeds ==
1. (Zimbabwe) Cara Black / (United States) Liezel Huber (champions)
2. (Ukraine) Alona Bondarenko / (Ukraine) Kateryna Bondarenko (first round)
3. (United States) Lisa Raymond / (Australia) Samantha Stosur (first round)
4. (United States) Bethanie Mattek / (India) Sania Mirza (first round)

== Draw ==
=== Key ===
- Q = Qualifier
- WC = Wild card
- LL = Lucky loser
- Alt = Alternate
- SE = Special exempt
- PR = Protected ranking
- ITF = ITF entry
- JE = Junior exempt
- w/o = Walkover
- r = Retired
- d = Defaulted
- SR = Special ranking

=== Draw ===
First round
1	(Zimbabwe) C Black (United States) L Huber	6	6
(Japan) A Morita (Japan) A Nakamura	1	1
(Australia) C Dellacqua (Australia) R Stubbs	7	2	[8]
(United States) J Craybas (Belarus) O Govortsova	5	6	[10]
4	(United States) B Mattek (India) S Mirza	4	6	[4]
(South Africa) N Grandin (United States) R Kops-Jones	6	3	[10]
(Russia) Y Shvedova (Thailand) T Tanasugarn	6	6
WC	(United Kingdom) A Keothavong (United Kingdom) M South	0	2
(United States) V King (Russia) A Kudryavtseva	7	4	[11]
(United States) C Gullickson (Czech Republic) V Uhlířová	5	6	[9]
(Chinese Taipei) C-j Chuang (Japan) R Fujiwara	7	6
3	(United States) L Raymond (Australia) S Stosur	5	3
(Belarus) T Poutchek (Russia) A Rodionova	3	4
(Netherlands) M Krajicek (Romania) M Niculescu	6	6
(France) S Brémond (Spain) V Ruano Pascual	6	6
2	(Ukraine) A Bondarenko (Ukraine) K Bondarenko	4	4

Quarterfinals
1	(Zimbabwe) C Black (United States) L Huber	6	7
(United States) J Craybas (Belarus) O Govortsova	2	5
(South Africa) N Grandin (United States) R Kops-Jones	1	1
(Russia) Y Shvedova (Thailand) T Tanasugarn	6	6
(United States) V King (Russia) A Kudryavtseva	6	4	[10]
(Chinese Taipei) C-j Chuang (Japan) R Fujiwara	4	6	[7]
(Netherlands) M Krajicek (Romania) M Niculescu	2	4
(France) S Brémond (Spain) V Ruano Pascual	6	6

Semifinals
1	(Zimbabwe) C Black (United States) L Huber	5	6	[10]
(Russia) Y Shvedova (Thailand) T Tanasugarn	7	4	[4]
(United States) V King (Russia) A Kudryavtseva	4	6	[8]
(France) S Brémond (Spain) V Ruano Pascual	6	4	[10]

Final
1	(Zimbabwe) C Black (United States) L Huber	6	6
(France) S Brémond (Spain) V Ruano Pascual	2	1
