= Birmingham Classic (tennis) =

Coordinates: 52°27′30″N 1°54′46″W

Birmingham Open
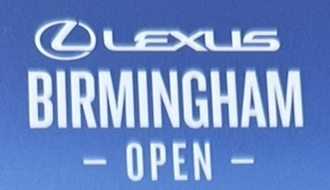

Tournament information
- Event name: Lexus Birmingham Open (2025-)
- Founded: 1982
- Editions: 44 (women); 2 (men)
- Location: Birmingham; United Kingdom
- Venue: Edgbaston Priory Club
- Surface: Grass – outdoors
- Draw: 32S / 24Q / 16D
- Website: lta.org.uk

Current champions (2026)
- Men's singles: (China) Bu Yunchaokete
- Women's singles: (Philippines) Alexandra Eala
- Men's doubles: (United Kingdom) Ben Jones (United Kingdom) Joshua Paris
- Women's doubles: (Australia) Talia Gibson (Indonesia) Janice Tjen
ATP Tour
- Category: ATP 125
- Prize money: €203,900 (2026)
WTA Tour
- Category: WTA 125
- Prize money: US$225,000 (2026)

The Lexus Birmingham Open (sponsored by Lexus) is a WTA 125 and an ATP Challenger 125 tennis tournament (since 2025). It is held at the Edgbaston Priory Club in Edgbaston, Birmingham, United Kingdom. It is a grass court warm-up for Wimbledon and a sister tournament to the Queen's Club Championships.

Pam Shriver holds the record for the most singles titles with four (1984–1987 consecutively).

== History ==
Held at this location since 1982, it is the successor event to Midland Counties Championships (1882-1977) a combined event that was also held at the same venue.

Prior to 2014, the event was part of the WTA's International series. Between 2014 and 2019, it was a premier level tournament. The 2020 competition was completely cancelled due to the COVID-19 pandemic. It was a WTA 250 event from 2021 until 2024.

Sponsorship of the tournament has changed through the years, with the current sponsored name being the "Lexus Birmingham Open". Previously, the event has been called the "Rothesay Classic", "Viking Classic", "Nature Valley Classic", "Aegon Birmingham Classic", the "DFS Classic", the "Dow Classic", and the "Edgbaston Cup."

== Past finals ==
=== Women's singles ===
Year	Champion	Runner-up	Score	Name
2026	(Philippines) Alexandra Eala	(Czech Republic) Nikola Bartůňková	5–7, 6–3, 7–5	Lexus Birmingham Open
2025	(Belgium) Greet Minnen	(Czech Republic) Linda Fruhvirtová	6–2, 6–1	Lexus Birmingham Open
↑ WTA 125 ↑
2024	(Kazakhstan) Yulia Putintseva	(Australia) Ajla Tomljanović	6–1, 7–6^{(10–8)}	Rothesay Classic
2023	(Latvia) Jeļena Ostapenko	(Czech Republic) Barbora Krejčíková	7–6^{(10–8)}, 6–4	Rothesay Classic
2022	(Brazil) Beatriz Haddad Maia	(China) Zhang Shuai	5–4 ret.	Rothesay Classic
2021	(Tunisia) Ons Jabeur	(Russia) Daria Kasatkina	7–5, 6–4	Viking Classic
↑ WTA 250 ↑
2020	completely cancelled due to the COVID-19 pandemic			
2019	(Australia) Ashleigh Barty	(Germany) Julia Görges	6–3, 7–5	Nature Valley Classic
2018	(Czech Republic) Petra Kvitová (2)	(Slovakia) Magdaléna Rybáriková	4–6, 6–1, 6–2	Nature Valley Classic
2017	(Czech Republic) Petra Kvitová	(Australia) Ashleigh Barty	4–6, 6–3, 6–2	Aegon Classic
2016	(United States) Madison Keys	(Czech Republic) Barbora Strýcová	6–3, 6–4	Aegon Classic
2015	(Germany) Angelique Kerber	(Czech Republic) Karolína Plíšková	6–7^{(5–7)}, 6–3, 7–6^{(7–4)}	Aegon Classic
2014	(Serbia) Ana Ivanovic	(Czech Republic) Barbora Záhlavová-Strýcová	6–3, 6–2	Aegon Classic
↑ Premier tournament ↑				Aegon Classic
2013	(Slovakia) Daniela Hantuchová	(Croatia) Donna Vekić	7–6^{(7–5)}, 6–4	Aegon Classic
2012	(United States) Melanie Oudin	(Serbia) Jelena Janković	6–4, 6–2	Aegon Classic
2011	(Germany) Sabine Lisicki	(Slovakia) Daniela Hantuchová	6–3, 6–2	Aegon Classic
2010	(China) Li Na	(Russia) Maria Sharapova	7–5, 6–1	Aegon Classic
2009	(Slovakia) Magdaléna Rybáriková	(China) Li Na	6–0, 7–6^{(7–2)}	Aegon Classic
2008	(Ukraine) Kateryna Bondarenko	(Belgium) Yanina Wickmayer	7–6^{(9–7)}, 3–6, 7–6^{(7–4)}	DFS Classic
2007	(Serbia) Jelena Janković	(Russia) Maria Sharapova	4–6, 6–3, 7–5	DFS Classic
2006	(Russia) Vera Zvonareva	(United States) Jamea Jackson	7–6^{(14–12)}, 7–6^{(7–5)}	DFS Classic
2005	(Russia) Maria Sharapova (2)	(Serbia and Montenegro) Jelena Janković	6–2, 4–6, 6–1	DFS Classic
2004	(Russia) Maria Sharapova	(France) Tatiana Golovin	4–6, 6–2, 6–1	DFS Classic
2003	(Bulgaria) Magdalena Maleeva	(Japan) Shinobu Asagoe	6–1, 6–4	DFS Classic
2002	(Federal Republic of Yugoslavia) Jelena Dokic	(Russia) Anastasia Myskina	6–2, 6–3	DFS Classic
2001	(France) Nathalie Tauziat (2)	(Netherlands) Miriam Oremans	6–3, 7–5	DFS Classic
2000	(United States) Lisa Raymond	(Thailand) Tamarine Tanasugarn	6–2, 6–7^{(7–9)}, 6–4	DFS Classic
1999	(France) Julie Halard-Decugis	(France) Nathalie Tauziat	6–2, 3–6, 6–4	DFS Classic
1998	cancelled after quarterfinals due to rain			DFS Classic
1997	(France) Nathalie Tauziat	(Indonesia) Yayuk Basuki	2–6, 6–2, 6–2	DFS Classic
1996	(United States) Meredith McGrath	(France) Nathalie Tauziat	2–6, 6–4, 6–4	DFS Classic
1995	(United States) Zina Garrison-Jackson (2)	(United States) Lori McNeil	6–3, 6–3	DFS Classic
1994	(United States) Lori McNeil (2)	(United States) Zina Garrison-Jackson	6–2, 6–2	DFS Classic
1993	(United States) Lori McNeil	(United States) Zina Garrison-Jackson	6–4, 2–6, 6–3	DFS Classic
1992	(Netherlands) Brenda Schultz	(Australia) Jenny Byrne	6–2, 6–2	Dow Classic
1991	(United States) Martina Navratilova (2)	(Soviet Union) Natasha Zvereva	6–4, 7–6^{(8–6)}	Dow Classic
1990	(United States) Zina Garrison	(Czechoslovakia) Helena Suková	6–4, 6–1	Dow Classic
1989	(United States) Martina Navratilova	(United States) Zina Garrison	7–6, 6–3	Dow Classic
1988	(West Germany) Claudia Kohde-Kilsch	(United States) Pam Shriver	6–2, 6–1	Dow Chemical Classic
1987	(United States) Pam Shriver (4)	(Soviet Union) Larisa Savchenko	4–6, 6–2, 6–2	Dow Chemical Classic
1986	(United States) Pam Shriver (3)	(Bulgaria) Manuela Maleeva	6–2, 7–6	Edgbaston Cup
1985	(United States) Pam Shriver (2)	(United States) Betsy Nagelsen	6–1, 6–0	Edgbaston Cup
1984	(United States) Pam Shriver	(United States) Anne White	7–6, 6–3	Edgbaston Cup
1983	(United States) Billie Jean King (2)	(United States) Alycia Moulton	6–0, 7–5	Edgbaston Cup
1982	(United States) Billie Jean King	(South Africa) Rosalyn Fairbank	6–2, 6–1	Edgbaston Cup

=== Champions by country ===
Country	Winner	First title	Last title
United States (USA)	16	1982	2016
France (FRA)	3	1997	2001
Russia (RUS)	3	2004	2006
Slovakia (SVK)	2	2009	2013
Serbia (SER)	2	2007	2014
Germany (GER)	2	2011	2015
Czech Republic (CZE)	2	2017	2018
West Germany (FRG)	1	1988	1988
Netherlands (NED)	1	1992	1992
Yugoslavia (YUG)	1	2002	2002
Bulgaria (BUL)	1	2003	2003
Ukraine (UKR)	1	2008	2008
China (CHN)	1	2010	2010
Australia (AUS)	1	2019	2019
Tunisia (TUN)	1	2021	2021
Brazil (BRA)	1	2022	2022
Latvia (LAT)	1	2023	2023
Kazakhstan (KAZ)	1	2024	2024
Belgium (BEL)	1	2025	2025
Philippines (PHI)	1	2026	2026

=== Women's doubles ===
Year	Champions	Runners-up	Score	Name
2026	(Australia) Talia Gibson (Indonesia) Janice Tjen	(United Kingdom) Harriet Dart (United Kingdom) Maia Lumsden	6–4, 6–3	Lexus Birmingham Open
2025	(Australia) Destanee Aiava (Spain) Cristina Bucșa	(United Kingdom) Alicia Barnett (France) Elixane Lechemia	6–4, 6–2	Lexus Birmingham Open
↑ WTA 125 ↑
2024	(Chinese Taipei) Hsieh Su-wei (3) (Belgium) Elise Mertens	(Japan) Miyu Kato (China) Zhang Shuai	6–1, 6–3	Rothesay Classic
2023	(Ukraine) Marta Kostyuk (Czech Republic) Barbora Krejčíková	(Australia) Storm Hunter (United States) Alycia Parks	6–2, 7–6^{(9–7)}	Rothesay Classic
2022	(Ukraine) Lyudmyla Kichenok (Latvia) Jeļena Ostapenko	(Belgium) Elise Mertens (China) Zhang Shuai	walkover	Rothesay Classic
2021	(Czech Republic) Marie Bouzková (Czech Republic) Lucie Hradecká	(Tunisia) Ons Jabeur (Australia) Ellen Perez	6–4, 2–6, [10–8]	Viking Classic
↑ WTA 250 ↑
2020	completely cancelled due to the COVID-19 pandemic			
2019	(Chinese Taipei) Hsieh Su-wei (2) (Czech Republic) Barbora Strýcová (2)	(Germany) Anna-Lena Grönefeld (Netherlands) Demi Schuurs	6–4, 6–7^{(4–7)}, [10–8]	Nature Valley Classic
2018	(Hungary) Tímea Babos (2) (France) Kristina Mladenovic	(Belgium) Elise Mertens (Netherlands) Demi Schuurs	4–6, 6–3, [10–8]	Nature Valley Classic
2017	(Australia) Ashleigh Barty (2) (Australia) Casey Dellacqua (2)	(Chinese Taipei) Chan Hao-ching (China) Zhang Shuai	6–1, 2–6, [10–8]	Aegon Classic
2016	(Czech Republic) Karolína Plíšková (Czech Republic) Barbora Strýcová	(United States) Vania King (Russia) Alla Kudryavtseva	6–3, 7–6^{(7–1)}	Aegon Classic
2015	(Spain) Garbiñe Muguruza (Spain) Carla Suárez Navarro	(Czech Republic) Andrea Hlaváčková (Czech Republic) Lucie Hradecká	6–4, 6–4	Aegon Classic
2014	(United States) Raquel Kops-Jones (United States) Abigail Spears	(Australia) Ashleigh Barty (Australia) Casey Dellacqua	7–6^{(7–1)}, 6–1	Aegon Classic
↑ Premier tournament ↑				Aegon Classic
2013	(Australia) Ashleigh Barty (Australia) Casey Dellacqua	(Zimbabwe) Cara Black (New Zealand) Marina Erakovic	7–5, 6–4	Aegon Classic
2012	(Hungary) Tímea Babos (Chinese Taipei) Hsieh Su-wei	(United States) Liezel Huber (United States) Lisa Raymond	7–5, 6–7^{(2–7)}, [10–8]	Aegon Classic
2011	(Belarus) Olga Govortsova (Russia) Alla Kudryavtseva	(Italy) Sara Errani (Italy) Roberta Vinci	1–6, 6–1, [10–5]	Aegon Classic
2010	(Zimbabwe) Cara Black (4) (United States) Lisa Raymond	(United States) Liezel Huber (United States) Bethanie Mattek-Sands	6–3, 3–2 ret.	Aegon Classic
2009	(Zimbabwe) Cara Black (3) (United States) Liezel Huber (2)	(United States) Raquel Kops-Jones (United States) Abigail Spears	6–1, 6–4	Aegon Classic
2008	(Zimbabwe) Cara Black (2) (United States) Liezel Huber	(France) Séverine Brémond (Spain) Virginia Ruano Pascual	6–2, 6–1	DFS Classic
2007	(Chinese Taipei) Chan Yung-jan (Chinese Taipei) Chuang Chia-jung	(China) Sun Tiantian (United States) Meilen Tu	7–6^{(7–3)}, 6–3	DFS Classic
2006	(Serbia and Montenegro) Jelena Janković (China) Li Na	(United States) Jill Craybas (South Africa) Liezel Huber	6–2, 6–4	DFS Classic
2005	(Slovakia) Daniela Hantuchová (Japan) Ai Sugiyama	(Greece) Eleni Daniilidou (United States) Jennifer Russell	6–2, 6–3	DFS Classic
2004	(Russia) Maria Kirilenko (Russia) Maria Sharapova	(Australia) Lisa McShea (Venezuela) Milagros Sequera	6–2, 6–1	DFS Classic
2003	(Belgium) Els Callens (3) (United States) Meilen Tu	(Australia) Alicia Molik (United States) Martina Navratilova	7–5, 6–4	DFS Classic
2002	(Japan) Shinobu Asagoe (Belgium) Els Callens (2)	(United States) Kimberly Po-Messerli (France) Nathalie Tauziat	6–4, 6–3	DFS Classic
2001	(Zimbabwe) Cara Black (Russia) Elena Likhovtseva	(United States) Kimberly Po-Messerli (France) Nathalie Tauziat	6–1, 6–2	DFS Classic
2000	(Australia) Rachel McQuillan (Australia) Lisa McShea	(Zimbabwe) Cara Black (Kazakhstan) Irina Selyutina	6–3, 7–6^{(7–3)}	DFS Classic
1999	(United States) Corina Morariu (Latvia) Larisa Neiland (3)	(France) Alexandra Fusai (Argentina) Inés Gorrochategui	6–4, 6–4	DFS Classic
1998	(Belgium) Els Callens (France) Julie Halard-Decugis	(United States) Lisa Raymond (Australia) Rennae Stubbs	2–6, 6–4, 6–4	DFS Classic
1997	(United States) Katrina Adams (Latvia) Larisa Neiland (2)	(France) Nathalie Tauziat (United States) Linda Wild	6–2, 6–3	DFS Classic
1996	(Australia) Elizabeth Smylie (2) (United States) Linda Wild	(United States) Lori McNeil (France) Nathalie Tauziat	6–3, 3–6, 6–1	DFS Classic
1995	(Netherlands) Manon Bollegraf (Australia) Rennae Stubbs (2)	(Australia) Nicole Bradtke (Australia) Kristine Radford	3–6, 6–4, 6–4	DFS Classic
1994	(United States) Zina Garrison-Jackson (Latvia) Larisa Neiland	(Australia) Catherine Barclay (Australia) Kerry-Anne Guse	6–4, 6–4	DFS Classic
1993	(United States) Lori McNeil (2) (United States) Martina Navratilova	(United States) Pam Shriver (Australia) Elizabeth Smylie	6–3, 6–4	DFS Classic
1992	(United States) Lori McNeil (Australia) Rennae Stubbs	(United States) Sandy Collins (South Africa) Elna Reinach	5–7, 6–3, 8–6	Dow Classic
1991	(Australia) Nicole Provis (Australia) Elizabeth Smylie	(United States) Sandy Collins (South Africa) Elna Reinach	6–3, 6–4	Dow Classic
1990	(Soviet Union) Larisa Savchenko (3) (Soviet Union) Natasha Zvereva (3)	(United States) Gretchen Magers (South Africa) Lise Gregory	3–6, 6–3, 6–3	Dow Classic
1989	(Soviet Union) Larisa Savchenko (2) (Soviet Union) Natasha Zvereva (2)	(United States) Meredith McGrath (United States) Pam Shriver	7–5, 5–7, 6–0	Dow Classic
1988	(Soviet Union) Larisa Savchenko (Soviet Union) Natasha Zvereva	(Soviet Union) Leila Meskhi (Soviet Union) Svetlana Parkhomenko	6–4, 6–1	Dow Classic
1987	Cancelled due to rain			Dow Chemical Classic
1986	(United States) Elise Burgin (South Africa) Rosalyn Fairbank	(Australia) Elizabeth Smylie (Australia) Wendy Turnbull	6–2, 6–4	Edgbaston Cup
1985	(United States) Terry Holladay (United States) Sharon Walsh-Pete (2)	(United States) Elise Burgin (United States) Alycia Moulton	6–4, 5–7, 6–3	Edgbaston Cup
1984	(United States) Leslie Allen (United States) Anne White	(United States) Barbara Jordan (Australia) Elizabeth Sayers	7–6, 6–3	Edgbaston Cup
1983	(United States) Billie Jean King (United States) Sharon Walsh	(South Africa) Beverly Mould (Australia) Elizabeth Sayers	6–2, 6–4	Edgbaston Cup
1982	(United Kingdom) Jo Durie (United Kingdom) Anne Hobbs	(United States) Rosie Casals (Australia) Wendy Turnbull	6–3, 6–2	Edgbaston Cup

=== Champions by country ===
Country	Winner	First title	Last title
United States (USA)	20	1983	2014
Australia (AUS)	10	1991	2026
Soviet Union (URS)	6	1988	1990
Czech Republic (CZE)	5	2016	2023
Chinese Taipei (TPE)	5	2007	2024
Russia (RUS)	4	2001	2011
Zimbabwe (ZIM)	4	2001	2010
Belgium (BEL)	4	1998	2024
Spain (ESP)	3	2015	2025
Ukraine (UKR)	2	2022	2023
Great Britain (GBR)	2	1982	1982
Latvia (LAT)	2	1997	2022
France (FRA)	2	1998	2018
Japan (JPN)	2	2002	2005
Hungary (HUN)	2	2012	2018
South Africa (RSA)	1	1986	1986
Slovakia (SVK)	1	2005	2005
China (CHN)	1	2006	2006
Serbia and Montenegro (SCG)	1	2006	2006
Belarus (BLR)	1	2011	2011
Indonesia (INA)	1	2026	2026

=== Men's singles ===
Year	Champion	Runner-up	Score
2026	(China) Bu Yunchaokete	(Finland) Otto Virtanen	2–6, 7–6^{(7–3)}, 6–3
2025	(Finland) Otto Virtanen	(United States) Colton Smith	6–4, 6–4

=== Men's doubles ===
Year	Champions	Runners-up	Score
2026	(United Kingdom) Ben Jones (United Kingdom) Joshua Paris	(India) Anirudh Chandrasekar (Japan) Takeru Yuzuki	6–4, 7–6^{(7–4)}
2025	(Brazil) Marcelo Demoliner (France) Sadio Doumbia	(Ecuador) Diego Hidalgo (United States) Patrik Trhac	6–4, 3–6, [10–5]

== See also ==
- Birmingham Open – defunct British ATP tournament
- ATP Birmingham – defunct American ATP tournament
