= Edgbaston Priory Club =

Leisure club in Birmingham, England

- Predecessor: Priory Lawn Tennis Club (founded 1875); Edgbaston Cricket & Lawn Tennis Club (founded 1878)
- Founded: 1964
- Type: Sport & leisure club
- Location: Edgbaston, Birmingham, England
- Coordinates: 52.4589°N 1.9128°W
- Services: Tennis; Padel; Squash; Gym; Indoor Pool; Outdoor Pool
- Members: 3000+
- Key people: Claire Daniel-Lepore
- Affiliations: Lordswood Community Tennis
- Website: www.edgbastonpriory.com

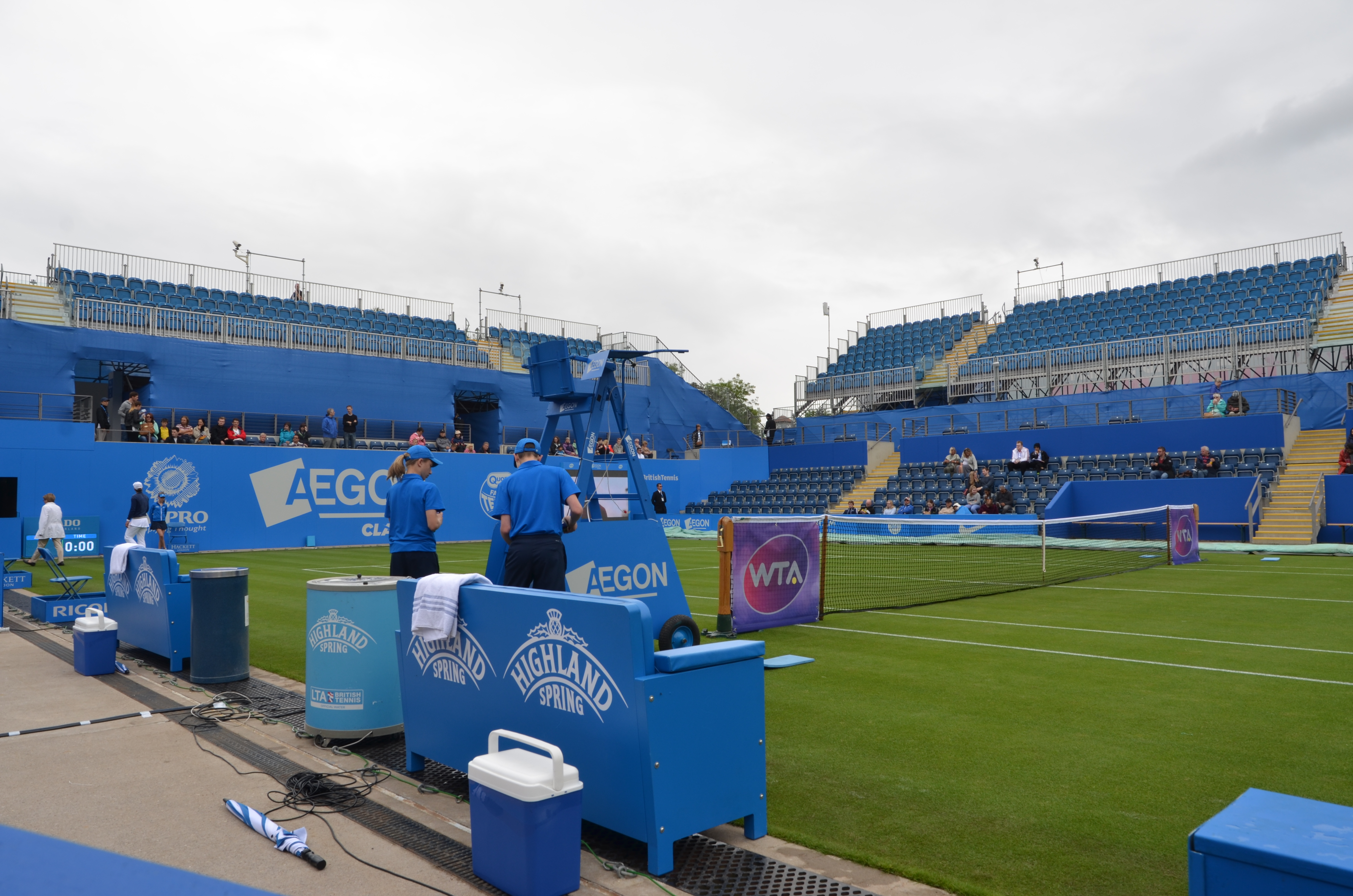
Ann Jones Centre Court

The Edgbaston Priory Club is a private members' tennis, squash and leisure club in Birmingham, England. The club is the host of the annual WTA Tour stop, the Lexus Birmingham Open. The 'Ann Jones Court' stadium has a capacity of 2,500 people (1,000 permanent and 1,500 temporary).

The club has a fitness suite and class studio, a bar and bistro area, indoor and outdoor pools, 30+ tennis courts and 10 squash courts. It is considered one of the premier racquets clubs in the UK.

== History ==
The Edgbaston Priory was formed by the merger in 1964 of two of the earliest lawn tennis clubs, the Priory Lawn Tennis Club (founded 1875), and the Edgbaston Cricket & Lawn Tennis Club (founded 1878). The Priory started with two courts on the Pershore Road, and moved about a mile to its current site in the early 1880s. Edgbaston Cricket & Lawn Tennis Club was founded by a breakaway from another local club which had played lawn tennis since 1872, and where the inventor of the game Major Harry Gem, who had first played lawn tennis only five minutes' walk from Edgbaston Priory's grounds, was a member.

In the years before the First World War the Edgbaston Cricket & Lawn Tennis Club was the larger and more prestigious of the two clubs. It had more courts, its patrons were millionaire landowners and industrialists, and from 1881 it hosted one of the earliest open lawn tennis competitions, known from 1882 as the Midland Counties Championships. Amongst the winners of this event were Maud Watson, who went on to be the first Ladies' singles champion at Wimbledon in 1884, and the Lowe brothers, Gordon and Arthur, sons of the local MP Sir Francis, both amongst the world's top ten players at their peak. The Priory had a smaller membership and fewer resources, but maintained a full programme of dozens of weekly fixtures, mostly with other Birmingham and Black Country clubs, and developed its own men's and women's competitions from 1887 onwards. In 1896 the Priory was the venue for the formation of Warwickshire County Lawn Tennis Association, and to the present day has consistently nurtured players to county level and beyond. By 1903 the Priory had begun its Whitsun tournament, which proved to be a platform for international talent in the inter-war years.

World War periods

Between the First and Second World Wars, both clubs expanded their memberships and facilities and hosted tournaments featuring the world's best players. In the early 1930s, both clubs opened squash courts and started junior tournaments. Two Davis Cup ties were held at Edgbaston Cricket & Lawn Tennis Club in the 1920s, and by the 1930s the Priory's Whitsuntide tournament was attracting stars from around the globe including Grand Slam champions such as Helen Jacobs and Anita Lizana. Local talent also developed on the Priory's courts: Dorothy Round, the Wimbledon Champion of 1934 and 1937 who was born ten miles away in Dudley, won the Whitsuntide tournament five times in the 1920s and 1930s; future British No 1 Tony Mottram joined as a teenager in 1937 because "the Priory was a club with a powerful and competitive atmosphere." The same year The Times commented that "the game is as strong in the Midlands as anywhere, and no club does more to encourage it than the Priory."

After 1945 Edgbaston and the Priory both continued this record of membership growth and high standards of play from both home talent and visitors – both hosted Davis Cup ties and both welcomed Wimbledon winners to their own tournaments – and both planned expansion.

1960s

Following a fire on 15 April 1963 which destroyed the Priory's Clubhouse, the clubs agreed to merge to form the present Edgbaston Priory Club, based at the Priory's grounds. The club built upon its predecessors' strengths in developing new players, new facilities and new tournaments. Throughout the 1960s and 1970s Edgbaston Priory members competed at Wimbledon, most famously Ann Haydon-Jones, the 1969 Ladies' singles champion who opened the club's new centre court named after her in 2013. Since the merger, club members and teams have continued to win national and sometimes international titles. Stars of squash such as Jonah Barrington used Edgbaston Priory's facilities both to showcase the game at tournaments including the British Open and the Prodorite, and as members of the club. In 1995 the Edgbaston Priory Ladies' Squash team were European Champions, and in 2011 both the Men's and Ladies' teams were national champions. The Edgbaston Priory Club is a Lawn Tennis Association High Performance Centre.

As well as hosting another British Davis Cup win, in 1969 against West Germany, Edgbaston Priory was the venue of the Golden Jubilee tournament of the International Lawn Tennis Club of Great Britain in 1974 and the John Player Tennis Tournament of 1978, at which stars of 1970s lawn tennis including Björn Borg, Jimmy Connors, Ilie Nastase and Arthur Ashe played. Since 1982 Edgbaston Priory has hosted the pre-Wimbledon Ladies' competition, the Classic, first known as the Edgbaston Cup, and subsequently sponsored by Dow, DFS, Aegon and Nature Valley. The singles' trophy itself – the cup brought back from Wimbledon by Maud Watson after her second singles title in 1885 – has been won by Billie Jean King, Martina Navratilova, Maria Sharapova and Li Na. Edgbaston Priory built a new clubhouse in 1967 and developed leisure facilities including another swimming pool and a gym in 1992, and its membership grew to over 3,000.

2000s

Following a major redevelopment in 2012–13 at a cost of £12 million (including £5m from the LTA and a grant from England Squash and Racketball) there are now 32 tennis courts (hard and grass, indoor and outdoor) and 10 squash courts at Edgbaston Priory, and a new clubhouse roughly twice the size of its predecessor.

In August 2023 the centre hosted the Paralympic team sport of goalball as part of the IBSA World Games.
