= Shannan McCarthy =

American tennis player

- Full name: Shannan McCarthy Gaudette
- Country (sports): United States
- Born: May 19, 1970 (age 55) Georgia, U.S.
- Prize money: $172,766

Singles
- Career record: 143–109
- Career titles: 0
- Highest ranking: No. 153 (November 2, 1992)

Grand Slam singles results
- US Open: 1R (1992)

Doubles
- Career record: 129–89
- Career titles: 0
- Highest ranking: No. 60 (July 26, 1993)

Grand Slam doubles results
- Australian Open: 2R (1993)
- French Open: 2R (1993)
- Wimbledon: 1R (1992, 1994)
- US Open: 2R (1991)

Shannan McCarthy Gaudette (born May 19, 1970) is a former professional tennis player from the United States.

== Biography ==
McCarthy played collegiate tennis at the University of Georgia from 1989 to 1992, along with identical twin sister Shawn. A Georgia local, she earned a total of seven All-American selections and set a university record 150 career singles wins. In 1992 she was runner-up to Lisa Raymond in the NCAA Championships. She was granted a wildcard into the women's singles draw at the 1992 US Open and was beaten in the first round by Sabine Hack.

From 1992 she began touring professionally and was most successful in the doubles format. As a doubles player she was runner-up in three WTA Tour tournaments and was ranked a career high 60 in 1993. She reached a top ranking in singles of 153 in the world. In 1997 she partnered with Kelly Pace to win a $75k doubles tournament in Wichita, which was the last professional tournament she played on tour.

She and her husband, physical therapist Mike Gaudette, have four children, including a set of triplets.

== WTA Tour career finals ==
=== Doubles: 3 (3 runner-ups) ===
Result	Date	Tournament	Tier	Surface	Partner	Opponents	Score
Loss	Aug 1991	Schenectady, U.S.	Tier V	Hard	(United States) Nicole Arendt	(Australia) Rachel McQuillan (Germany) Claudia Porwik	2–6, 4–6
Loss	Aug 1992	Schenectady, U.S.	Tier V	Hard	(United States) Ginger Helgeson	(France) Alexia Dechaume (Argentina) Florencia Labat	3–6, 6–1, 2–6
Loss	Jan 1993	Brisbane, Australia	Tier III	Hard	(United States) Kimberly Po	(Spain) Conchita Martínez (Latvia) Larisa Neiland	2–6, 2–6
