= 2001 DFS Classic – Doubles =

Doubles
- 2001 DFS Classic

Final
- Champions: (Zimbabwe) Cara Black (Russia) Elena Likhovtseva
- Runners-up: (United States) Kimberly Po-Messerli (France) Nathalie Tauziat
- Score: 6–1, 6–2

Events
| Singles | Doubles |
| ← 2000 · | Birmingham Classic | · 2002 → |

Rachel McQuillan and Lisa McShea were the defending champions but lost in the first round to Kerry-Anne Guse and Alicia Molik.

Cara Black and Elena Likhovtseva won in the final 6–1, 6–2 against Kimberly Po-Messerli and Nathalie Tauziat.

== Seeds ==
Champion seeds are indicated in bold text while text in italics indicates the round in which those seeds were eliminated. The top four seeded teams received byes into the second round.

1. (Zimbabwe) **Cara Black** / (Russia) **Elena Likhovtseva (champions)**
2. (United States) Kimberly Po-Messerli / (France) Nathalie Tauziat (final)
3. (Belgium) Els Callens / (Italy) Rita Grande (second round)
4. (Australia) Nicole Pratt / (France) Anne-Gaëlle Sidot (semifinals)
5. (Netherlands) Kristie Boogert / (Netherlands) Miriam Oremans (first round)
6. (United States) Katie Schlukebir / (Kazakhstan) Irina Selyutina (second round)
7. (United States) Erika deLone / (South Africa) Liezel Huber (first round)
8. (Australia) Rachel McQuillan / (Australia) Lisa McShea (first round)

== Draw ==
=== Key ===
- Q = Qualifier
- WC = Wild card
- LL = Lucky loser
- Alt = Alternate
- SE = Special exempt
- PR = Protected ranking
- ITF = ITF entry
- JE = Junior exempt
- w/o = Walkover
- r = Retired
- d = Defaulted
- SR = Special ranking

=== Finals ===
Semifinals
1 | (Zimbabwe) **Cara Black** (Russia) **Elena Likhovtseva** | **6** | **6**
LL | (Australia) Evie Dominikovic (United States) Marissa Irvin | 2 | 2
4 | (Australia) Nicole Pratt (France) Anne-Gaëlle Sidot | 5 | 1
2 | (United States) **Kimberly Po-Messerli** (France) **Nathalie Tauziat** | **7** | **6**

Final
1 | (Zimbabwe) **Cara Black** (Russia) **Elena Likhovtseva** | **6** | **6**
2 | (United States) Kimberly Po-Messerli (France) Nathalie Tauziat | 1 | 2

=== Top half ===
First round
(Bulgaria) L Bacheva (Venezuela) M Vento | 6^{3} | **6** | 1
(Japan) **R Hiraki** (United States) **A Stevenson** | **7^{7}** | 3 | **6**
(South Africa) N de Villiers (Australia) A Ellwood | 6^{1} | **6** | 3
(Slovakia) **D Hantuchová** (Austria) **S Plischke** | **7^{7}** | 4 | **6**
(Denmark) **E Dyrberg** (Slovenia) **M Matevžič** | 6^{2} | **6** | **6**
7 | (United States) E deLone (South Africa) L Huber | **7^{7}** | 1 | 4
(Russia) **N Petrova** (Slovenia) **T Pisnik** | **6** | 3 | **6**
(Australia) T Musgrave (United States) L Osterloh | 3 | **6** | 0
(United States) S Reeves (South Africa) J Steck | 1 | 6^{5}
LL | (Australia) **E Dominikovic** (United States) **M Irvin** | **6** | **7^{7}**
WC | (United States) J Hopkins (United Kingdom) L Latimer | 3 | 2
6 | (United States) **K Schlukebir** (Kazakhstan) **I Selyutina** | **6** | **6**

Second round
1 | (Zimbabwe) **C Black** (Russia) **E Likhovtseva** | **w/o**
(Japan) R Hiraki (United States) A Stevenson
(Slovakia) D Hantuchová (Austria) S Plischke | 1 | 2
(Denmark) **E Dyrberg** (Slovenia) **M Matevžič** | **6** | **6**
3 | (Belgium) E Callens (Italy) R Grande | 4 | 5
(Russia) **N Petrova** (Slovenia) **T Pisnik** | **6** | **7**
LL | (Australia) **E Dominikovic** (United States) **M Irvin** | **6** | **7**
6 | (United States) K Schlukebir (Kazakhstan) I Selyutina | 1 | 5

Quarterfinals
1 | (Zimbabwe) **C Black** (Russia) **E Likhovtseva** | **6** | 4 | **6**
(Denmark) E Dyrberg (Slovenia) M Matevžič | 4 | **6** | 2
(Russia) N Petrova (Slovenia) T Pisnik | 6^{10} | **6** | 6^{6}
LL | (Australia) **E Dominikovic** (United States) **M Irvin** | **7^{12}** | 4 | **7^{8}**

Semifinals
1 | (Zimbabwe) **C Black** (Russia) **E Likhovtseva** | **6** | **6**
LL | (Australia) E Dominikovic (United States) M Irvin | 2 | 2

=== Bottom half ===
First round
8 | (Australia) R McQuillan (Australia) L McShea | 3 | **6** | 6^{1}
(Australia) **K-A Guse** (Australia) **A Molik** | **6** | 2 | **7^{7}**
(Japan) **S Asagoe** (Japan) **Y Yoshida** | **6** | **7**
(Russia) A Jidkova (United States) M Tu | 4 | 5
(France) **N Dechy** (Russia) **L Krasnoroutskaya** | **7** | **6**
(United States) D Buth (Canada) V Webb | 5 | 3
5 | (Netherlands) K Boogert (Netherlands) M Oremans | 6^{4} | 5
(Russia) **E Bovina** (Spain) **M Serna** | **7^{7}** | **7**
WC | (United Kingdom) **H Crook** (United Kingdom) **V Davies** | **6** | **7**
(Japan) H Inoue (South Korea) E-H Kim | 2 | 5
Q | (Greece) **E Daniilidou** (Serbia and Montenegro) **D Zarić** | **6** | **6**
(South Africa) K Grant (Germany) M Weingärtner | 4 | 4

Second round
(Australia) K-A Guse (Australia) A Molik | **6** | 4 | 3
(Japan) **S Asagoe** (Japan) **Y Yoshida** | 4 | **6** | **6**
(France) N Dechy (Russia) L Krasnoroutskaya | 6^{5} | 1
4 | (Australia) **N Pratt** (France) **A-G Sidot** | **7^{7}** | **6**
(Russia) E Bovina (Spain) M Serna | 4 | **7^{7}** | 2
WC | (United Kingdom) **H Crook** (United Kingdom) **V Davies** | **6** | 6^{5} | **6**
Q | (Greece) E Daniilidou (Serbia and Montenegro) D Zarić | 6^{1} | 4
2 | (United States) **K Po-Messerli** (France) **N Tauziat** | **7^{7}** | **6**

Quarterfinals
(Japan) S Asagoe (Japan) Y Yoshida | 3 | 2
4 | (Australia) **N Pratt** (France) **A-G Sidot** | **6** | **6**
WC | (United Kingdom) H Crook (United Kingdom) V Davies | **7** | 2 | 4
2 | (United States) **K Po-Messerli** (France) **N Tauziat** | 5 | **6** | **6**

Semifinals
4 | (Australia) N Pratt (France) A-G Sidot | 5 | 1
2 | (United States) **K Po-Messerli** (France) **N Tauziat** | **7** | **6**

=== Qualifying draw ===
First qualifying round
1 | (Argentina) C Fernández (Canada) R Kolbovic | 5
**(Australia) E Dominikovic** **(United States) M Irvin** | **8**
(Republic of Ireland) K Liggan (Slovakia) G Voleková | 1
**(South Africa) N Grandin** **(Tunisia) S Sfar** | **8**
**(Greece) E Daniilidou** **(Serbia and Montenegro) D Zarić** | **9^{7}**
WC | (United Kingdom) L Ahl (United Kingdom) H Collin | 8^{2}
**(United States) J Craybas** **(Russia) A Myskina** | **8**
2 | (Japan) R Fujiwara (Bulgaria) S Krivencheva | 4

Second qualifying round
**(Australia) E Dominikovic** **(United States) M Irvin** | **8**
(South Africa) N Grandin (Tunisia) S Sfar | 1
**(Greece) E Daniilidou** **(Serbia and Montenegro) D Zarić** | **8**
(United States) J Craybas (Russia) A Myskina | 2

Final qualifying round
(Australia) E Dominikovic (United States) M Irvin | 4 | 4
**(Greece) E Daniilidou** **(Serbia and Montenegro) D Zarić** | **6** | **6**
