= 2000 DFS Classic – Doubles =

Doubles
- 2000 DFS Classic

Final
- Champions: (Australia) Rachel McQuillan; (Australia) Lisa McShea
- Runners-up: (Zimbabwe) Cara Black; (Kazakhstan) Irina Selyutina
- Score: 6–3, 7–6^{(7–3)}

Details
- Draw: 28
- Seeds: 8

Events
Singles	Doubles
← 1999 ·	Birmingham Classic	· 2001 →

Corina Morariu and Larisa Neiland were the reigning champions, but they did not return to defend their title.

Rachel McQuillan and Lisa McShea won in the final 6–3, 7–6^{(7–3)} against Cara Black and Irina Selyutina.

== Seeds ==
Champion seeds are indicated in bold text while text in italics indicates the round in which those seeds were eliminated. The top four seeded teams received byes into the second round.

1. (United States) Lisa Raymond / (Australia) Rennae Stubbs (withdrew)
2. (France) Alexandra Fusai / (France) Nathalie Tauziat (quarterfinals)
3. (Slovenia) Tina Križan / (Slovenia) Katarina Srebotnik (second round)
4. (United States) Kimberly Po / (France) Anne-Gaëlle Sidot (quarterfinals)
5. (Zimbabwe) Cara Black / (Kazakhstan) Irina Selyutina (final)
6. (Netherlands) Kristie Boogert / (Netherlands) Miriam Oremans (first round)
7. (South Africa) Surina De Beer / (Japan) Nana Miyagi (quarterfinals)
8. (Belgium) Els Callens / (Australia) Alicia Molik (semifinals)

== Main draw ==
Key

- Q = Qualifier
- WC = Wild card
- LL = Lucky loser
- Alt = Alternate
- ITF = ITF entry
- PR = Protected ranking
- SR = Special ranking
- SE = Special exempt
- JE = Junior exempt
- JR = Junior Accelerator Programme entrant
- CO = College Accelerator Programme entrant
- NG = Next Gen Accelerator Program entrant
- w/o = Walkover
- r = Retired
- d = Defaulted

=== Finals ===
Semifinals

Final

**(Australia) Rachel McQuillan**
**(Australia) Lisa McShea**
3
**6**
**6**

8
- (Belgium) Els Callens
- (Australia) Alicia Molik
**6**
1
4

**(Australia) Rachel McQuillan**
**(Australia) Lisa McShea**
**6**
**7^{7}**

5
- (Zimbabwe) Cara Black
- (Kazakhstan) Irina Selyutina
3
6^{5}

- (United States) Erika deLone
- (Australia) Nicole Pratt
6^{5}
3

5
- (Zimbabwe) **Cara Black**
- (Kazakhstan) **Irina Selyutina**
**7^{7}**
**6**

=== Top half ===
First round

Second round

Quarterfinals

Semifinals

1
- (United States) L Raymond
- (Australia) R Stubbs

- (Russia) A Myskina
- (United States) L Osterloh
4
5

- (France) **C Dhenin**
- (South Africa) **K Grant**
w/o

- (France) **C Dhenin**
- (South Africa) **K Grant**
**6**
**7**

- (France) C Dhenin
- (South Africa) K Grant
**6**
3
0

- (Japan) S Asagoe
- (Japan) Y Yoshida
6^{9}
1

- (Australia) **R McQuillan**
- (Australia) **L McShea**
4
**6**
**6**

- (Australia) **R McQuillan**
- (Australia) **L McShea**
**7^{11}**
**6**

- (Australia) **R McQuillan**
- (Australia) **L McShea**
**6**
**6**

- (South Africa) **L Horn**
- (United States) **L Wild**
4
**6**
**6**

- (South Africa) L Horn
- (United States) L Wild
0
2

6
- (Netherlands) K Boogert
- (Netherlands) M Oremans
**6**
3
4

- (Australia) **R McQuillan**
- (Australia) **L McShea**
3
**6**
**6**

8
- (Belgium) E Callens
- (Australia) A Molik
**6**
1
4

4
- (United States) **K Po**
- (France) **A-G Sidot**
**6**
**6**

- (United States) **A Stevenson**
- (Canada) **V Webb**
4
**6**
**6**

- (United States) A Stevenson
- (Canada) V Webb
0
4

- (Croatia) J Kostanić
- (Slovenia) T Pisnik
**6**
3
4

4
- (United States) K Po
- (France) A-G Sidot
3
3

- (Belgium) L Courtois
- (Russia) L Krasnoroutskaya
**6**
2
2

8
- (Belgium) **E Callens**
- (Australia) **A Molik**
**6**
**6**

- (United Kingdom) **J Pullin**
- (United Kingdom) **L Woodroffe**
1
**6**
**6**

- (United Kingdom) J Pullin
- (United Kingdom) L Woodroffe
3
3

WC
- (United Kingdom) L Latimer
- (United Kingdom) S Smith
6^{3}
3

8
- (Belgium) **E Callens**
- (Australia) **A Molik**
**6**
**6**

8
- (Belgium) **E Callens**
- (Australia) **A Molik**
**7^{7}**
**6**

=== Bottom half ===
First round

Second round

Quarterfinals

Semifinals

7
- (South Africa) **S De Beer**
- (Japan) **N Miyagi**
**6**
2
**6**

- (Australia) C Barclay
- (Thailand) T Tanasugarn
4
**6**
4

5
- (South Africa) **S De Beer**
- (Japan) **N Miyagi**
w/o

- (Spain) **M Serna**
- (United States) **M Shaughnessy**
6^{5}
**6**
**6**

- (Spain) M Serna
- (United States) M Shaughnessy

- (Netherlands) A Hopmans
- (Croatia) S Talaja
**7^{7}**
2
4

5
- (South Africa) S De Beer
- (Japan) N Miyagi
2
3

- (Hungary) K Marosi-Aracama
- (Venezuela) M A Vento
6^{5}
4

- (United States) **E deLone**
- (Australia) **N Pratt**
**6**
**6**

- (United States) **E deLone**
- (Australia) **N Pratt**
**7^{7}**
**6**

- (United States) **E deLone**
- (Australia) **N Pratt**
**6**
**6**

3
- (Slovenia) T Križan
- (Slovenia) K Srebotnik
1
2

- (United States) E deLone
- (Australia) N Pratt
6^{5}
3

5
- (Zimbabwe) **C Black**
- (Kazakhstan) **I Selyutina**
**6**
**6**

5
- (Zimbabwe) **C Black**
- (Kazakhstan) **I Selyutina**
**7^{7}**
**6**

Q
- (Denmark) E Dyrberg
- (Slovakia) D Hantuchová
3
0

5
- (Zimbabwe) **C Black**
- (Kazakhstan) **I Selyutina**
**6**
4
**6**

- (Australia) **T Musgrave**
- (Australia) **B Stewart**
**6**
**6**

- (Australia) T Musgrave
- (Australia) B Stewart
3
**6**
3

WC
- (United Kingdom) H Crook
- (United Kingdom) V Davies
3
2

5
- (Zimbabwe) **C Black**
- (Kazakhstan) **I Selyutina**
**6**
**6**

- (France) **A Cocheteux**
- (France) **N Dechy**
**6**
**6**

2
- (France) A Fusai
- (France) N Tauziat
4
4

- (United States) J Hopkins
- (Slovenia) P Rampre
1
0

- (France) A Cocheteux
- (France) N Dechy
3
**7**
2

2
- (France) **A Fusai**
- (France) **N Tauziat**
**6**
5
**6**

=== Qualifying draw ===
First Qualifying round

Second Qualifying round

Final Qualifying round

1
- (Croatia) **M Lučić**
- (Russia) **N Petrova**
**8**

- (Paraguay) R de los Ríos
- (Canada) R Kolbovic
5

1
- (Croatia) **M Lučić**
- (Russia) **N Petrova**
**8**

- (United Kingdom) L Ahl
- (United Kingdom) H Collin
1

- (United Kingdom) **L Ahl**
- (United Kingdom) **H Collin**
**8**

- (United Kingdom) K Cross
- (United Kingdom) J Ward
6

1
- (Croatia) M Lučić
- (Russia) N Petrova
4
**6**
3

- (Denmark) **E Dyrberg**
- (Slovakia) **D Hantuchová**
**6**
2
**6**

- (Denmark) **E Dyrberg**
- (Slovakia) **D Hantuchová**
**9^{10}**

- (Luxembourg) A Kremer
- (Russia) T Panova
8^{8}

- (Denmark) **E Dyrberg**
- (Slovakia) **D Hantuchová**
**9**

2
- (Germany) J Kandarr
- (United States) H Parkinson
7

- (Australia) E Dominikovic
- (Australia) A Grahame
8^{6}

2
- (Germany) **J Kandarr**
- (United States) **H Parkinson**
**9^{8}**
