= 1998 DFS Classic – Doubles =

Doubles
- 1998 DFS Classic
- 1997 Champions: (United States) Katrina Adams (Latvia) Larisa Neiland

Final
- Champions: (Belgium) Els Callens (France) Julie Halard-Decugis
- Runners-up: (United States) Lisa Raymond (Australia) Rennae Stubbs
- Score: 2–6, 6–4, 6–4

Events
| Singles | Doubles |
| ← 1997 · | Birmingham Classic | · 1999 → |

Katrina Adams and Larisa Neiland were the defending champions but did not compete that year.

Els Callens and Julie Halard-Decugis won in the final 2–6, 6–4, 6–4 against Lisa Raymond and Rennae Stubbs.

== Seeds ==
Champion seeds are indicated in bold text while text in italics indicates the round in which those seeds were eliminated. The top four seeded teams received byes into the second round.

1. (United States) Lisa Raymond / (Australia) Rennae Stubbs (final)
2. (Australia) Rachel McQuillan / (Japan) Nana Miyagi (quarterfinals)
3. (Australia) Kristine Kunce / (Japan) Ai Sugiyama (quarterfinals)
4. (Netherlands) Kristie Boogert / (Netherlands) Miriam Oremans (semifinals)
5. (Indonesia) Yayuk Basuki / (Romania) Irina Spîrlea (withdrew)
6. (Australia) Catherine Barclay / (Australia) Kerry-Anne Guse (quarterfinals)
7. (Argentina) Florencia Labat / (Belgium) Dominique Van Roost (semifinals)
8. (Belgium) **Els Callens** / (France) **Julie Halard-Decugis (champions)**

== Draw ==
=== Key ===
- Q = Qualifier
- WC = Wild card
- LL = Lucky loser
- Alt = Alternate
- SE = Special exempt
- PR = Protected ranking
- ITF = ITF entry
- JE = Junior exempt
- w/o = Walkover
- r = Retired
- d = Defaulted
- SR = Special ranking

=== Final ===
Final

1
- (United States) Lisa Raymond
- (Australia) Rennae Stubbs
**6**
4
4

8
(Belgium) **Els Callens**
(France) **Julie Halard-Decugis**
2
**6**
**6**

=== Top half ===
First round

Second round

Quarterfinals

Semifinals

1
- (United States) **L Raymond**
- (Australia) **R Stubbs**
**7**
**6**

- (United States) S Reeves
- (Chinese Taipei) S-T Wang
**7**
6
3

- (United States) E deLone
- (United States) K Schlukebir
6
2

- (United States) **E deLone**
- (United States) **K Schlukebir**
5
**7**
**6**

1
- (United States) **L Raymond**
- (Australia) **R Stubbs**
**7**
**6**

- (Australia) A Ellwood
- (Australia) N Pratt
3
**7**
4

Alt
- (Zimbabwe) C Black
- (Kazakhstan) I Selyutina
5
1

- (Belarus) **O Barabanschikova**
- (Russia) **E Likhovtseva**
**6**
6
**6**

- (Belarus) O Barabanschikova
- (Russia) E Likhovtseva
3
1
r

- (Slovenia) T Križan
- (Slovenia) K Srebotnik
3
4

Alt
- (Zimbabwe) **C Black**
- (Kazakhstan) **I Selyutina**
**6**
**4**

Alt
- (Zimbabwe) **C Black**
- (Kazakhstan) **I Selyutina**
**6**
**6**

1
- (United States) **L Raymond**
- (Australia) **R Stubbs**
**6**
**6**

7
- (Argentina) F Labat
- (Belgium) D Van Roost
2
3

3
- (Australia) **K Kunce**
- (Japan) **A Sugiyama**
**6**
**6**

- (South Africa) **N de Villiers**
- (Australia) **L McShea**
**6**
**6**

- (South Africa) N de Villiers
- (Australia) L McShea
4
3

- (Australia) T Musgrave
- (Bulgaria) P Stoyanova
2
4

3
- (Australia) K Kunce
- (Japan) A Sugiyama
3
0

Q
- (South Africa) **S De Beer**
- (Canada) **M Drake**
**6**
6
**6**

7
- (Argentina) **F Labat**
- (Belgium) **D Van Roost**
**6**
**6**

- (Italy) L Golarsa
- (Argentina) M Paz
4
**7**
3

Q
- (South Africa) S De Beer
- (Canada) M Drake
**7**
6
1

- (Romania) C Cristea
- (Germany) C Singer
2
6

7
- (Argentina) **F Labat**
- (Belgium) **D Van Roost**
6
**7**
**6**

7
- (Argentina) **F Labat**
- (Belgium) **D Van Roost**
**6**
**7**

=== Bottom half ===
First round

Second round

Quarterfinals

Semifinals

6
- (Australia) **C Barclay**
- (Australia) **K-A Guse**
6
**7**
**6**

WC
- (United Kingdom) S Smith
- (United Kingdom) J Ward
**7**
5
1

6
- (Australia) **C Barclay**
- (Australia) **K-A Guse**
**6**
**6**

WC
- (United Kingdom) **H Crook**
- (United Kingdom) **V Davies**
**6**
**6**

WC
- (United Kingdom) H Crook
- (United Kingdom) V Davies
2
4

- (South Africa) L Horn
- (United States) R Jensen
4
1

6
- (Australia) C Barclay
- (Australia) K-A Guse
2
6

- (France) **C Dhenin**
- (Australia) **D Jones**
**6**
**6**

4
- (Netherlands) **K Boogert**
- (Netherlands) **M Oremans**
**6**
**7**

- (Poland) M Grzybowska
- (Thailand) T Tanasugarn
4
4

- (France) C Dhenin
- (Australia) D Jones
3
**7**
2

4
- (Netherlands) **K Boogert**
- (Netherlands) **M Oremans**
**6**
5
**6**

4
- (Netherlands) K Boogert
- (Netherlands) M Oremans
5
3

8
- (Belgium) **E Callens**
- (France) **J Halard-Decugis**
**6**
**6**

8
- (Belgium) **E Callens**
- (France) **J Halard-Decugis**
**7**
**6**

- (South Korea) E-H Kim
- (Japan) M Saeki
2
1

8
- (Belgium) **E Callens**
- (France) **J Halard-Decugis**
**6**
**6**

- (United Kingdom) J Pullin
- (United Kingdom) L Woodroffe
2
5

(Italy) R Grande
(France) É Loit
2
2

(Italy) **R Grande**
(France) **É Loit**
**6**
**7**

8
- (Belgium) **E Callens**
- (France) **J Halard-Decugis**
**7**
**6**

- (Bulgaria) S Krivencheva
- (Australia) L Pleming
4
4

2
- (Australia) R McQuillan
- (Japan) N Miyagi
6
2

LL
- (Netherlands) **S Noorlander**
- (Greece) **C Papadáki**
**6**
**6**

LL
- (Netherlands) S Noorlander
- (Greece) C Papadáki
4
3

2
- (Australia) **R McQuillan**
- (Japan) **N Miyagi**
**6**
**6**
