= 1999 DFS Classic – Doubles =

Doubles
- 1999 DFS Classic

Final
- Champions: (United States) Corina Morariu; (Latvia) Larisa Neiland
- Runners-up: (France) Alexandra Fusai; (Argentina) Inés Gorrochategui
- Score: 6–4, 6–4

Events
Singles	Doubles
← 1998 ·	Birmingham Classic	· 2000 →

The 1999 DFS Classic singles was the singles event of the seventeenth edition of the Aegon Classic, a WTA Tier III tournament held in Birmingham, England, United Kingdom and part of the European grass court season. Els Callens and Julie Halard-Decugis were the reigning champions but did not return to defend their title.

Corina Morariu and Larisa Neiland won in the final 6–4, 6–4 against Alexandra Fusai and Inés Gorrochategui.

== Seeds ==
The top four seeded teams received byes into the second round.

1. (United States) Lisa Raymond / (Australia) Rennae Stubbs (semifinals)
2. (South Africa) Mariaan de Swardt / (Ukraine) Elena Tatarkova (second round)
3. (United States) Corina Morariu / (Latvia) Larisa Neiland (champions)
4. (Australia) Kristine Kunce / (United States) Kimberly Po (quarterfinals)
5. (Zimbabwe) Cara Black / (Kazakhstan) Irina Selyutina (quarterfinals)
6. (France) Alexandra Fusai / (Argentina) Inés Gorrochategui (final)
7. (Australia) Catherine Barclay / (Australia) Kerry-Anne Guse (semifinals)
8. (Belgium) Sabine Appelmans / (Netherlands) Miriam Oremans (first round)

== Draw ==
=== Key ===
- Q = Qualifier
- WC = Wild card
- LL = Lucky loser
- Alt = Alternate
- SE = Special exempt
- PR = Protected ranking
- ITF = ITF entry
- JE = Junior exempt
- w/o = Walkover
- r = Retired
- d = Defaulted
- SR = Special ranking

=== Finals ===
Semifinals

Final

1
- (United States) Lisa Raymond
- (Australia) Rennae Stubbs
5
4

6
(France) Alexandra Fusai
(Argentina) Inés Gorrochategui
7
6

6
(France) Alexandra Fusai
(Argentina) Inés Gorrochategui
4
4

3
- (United States) Corina Morariu
- (Latvia) Larisa Neiland
6
6

3
- (United States) Corina Morariu
- (Latvia) Larisa Neiland
6
6

7
- (Australia) Catherine Barclay
- (Australia) Kerry-Anne Guse
4
3

=== Top half ===
First round

Second round

Quarterfinals

Semifinals

1
- (United States) L Raymond
- (Australia) R Stubbs
7
6

- (Italy) R Grande
- (Japan) M Saeki
6
6

- (Italy) R Grande
- (Japan) M Saeki
5
2

(France) A Cocheteux
(France) É Loit
1
4

1
- (United States) L Raymond
- (Australia) R Stubbs
3
6
6

- (United Kingdom) H Crook
- (United Kingdom) V Davies
4
0

- (United States) L McNeil
- (United States) L Wild
6
1
4

- (United States) L McNeil
- (United States) L Wild
6
6

- (United States) L McNeil
- (United States) L Wild
3
6
10

WC
- (United Kingdom) J Pullin
- (United Kingdom) L Woodroffe
7^{7}
6

- (United Kingdom) J Pullin
- (United Kingdom) L Woodroffe
6
4
8

8
- (Belgium) S Appelmans
- (Netherlands) M Oremans
6^{2}
3

1
- (United States) L Raymond
- (Australia) R Stubbs
5
4

6
- (France) A Fusai
- (Argentina) I Gorrochategui
7
6

4
- (Australia) K Kunce
- (United States) K Po
6
6^{3}
6

- (South Africa) E de Villiers
- (Japan) R Hiraki
w/o

- (South Africa) E de Villiers
- (Japan) R Hiraki
1
7^{7}
2

- (Australia) A Molik
- (France) S Testud

4
- (Australia) K Kunce
- (United States) K Po
6
4
4

- (Slovenia) T Križan
- (Croatia) M Murić
6
6

6
- (France) A Fusai
- (Argentina) I Gorrochategui
2
6
6

- (United States) E deLone
- (Australia) N Pratt
3
2

- (Slovenia) T Križan
- (Croatia) M Murić
3
3

- (United States) K Schlukebir
- (Thailand) T Tanasugarn
3
2

6
- (France) A Fusai
- (Argentina) I Gorrochategui
6
6

6
- (France) A Fusai
- (Argentina) I Gorrochategui
6
6

=== Bottom half ===
First round

Second round

Quarterfinals

Semifinals

5
- (Zimbabwe) C Black
- (Kazakhstan) I Selyutina
7
7

- (South Africa) L Horn
- (Slovenia) K Srebotnik
5
5

5
- (Zimbabwe) C Black
- (Kazakhstan) I Selyutina
6
7

- (Australia) L McShea
- (South Africa) J Steck
6
3
6

- (Australia) L McShea
- (South Africa) J Steck
3
5

- (Brazil) V Menga
- (Poland) A Olsza
2
6
4

5
- (Zimbabwe) C Black
- (Kazakhstan) I Selyutina
2
3

(Switzerland) E Gagliardi
(Federal Republic of Yugoslavia) S Naćuk
w/o

3
- (United States) C Morariu
- (Latvia) L Neiland
6
6

- (Belarus) O Barabanschikova
- (Greece) C Papadáki

(Switzerland) E Gagliardi
(Federal Republic of Yugoslavia) S Naćuk
3
3

3
- (United States) C Morariu
- (Latvia) L Neiland
6
6

3
- (United States) C Morariu
- (Latvia) L Neiland
6
6

7
- (Australia) C Barclay
- (Australia) K-A Guse
6
3
6

7
- (Australia) C Barclay
- (Australia) K-A Guse
4
3

WC
- (South Africa) S De Beer
- (United Kingdom) S Smith
1
6
3

7
- (Australia) C Barclay
- (Australia) K-A Guse
6
6^{5}
7

- (Australia) R McQuillan
- (Japan) N Miyagi
6
6

- (Australia) R McQuillan
- (Japan) N Miyagi
3
7^{7}
5

- (Australia) L Pleming
- (United States) M Shaughnessy
4
3

7
- (Australia) C Barclay
- (Australia) K-A Guse
w/o

- (Italy) L Golarsa
- (Germany) J Kandarr
3
6
6

- (Italy) L Golarsa
- (Germany) J Kandarr

- (Netherlands) K Boogert
- (France) A-G Sidot
6
4
4

- (Italy) L Golarsa
- (Germany) J Kandarr
7^{7}
2
6

2
- (South Africa) M de Swardt
- (Ukraine) E Tatarkova
6^{5}
6
4
