= 1997 DFS Classic – Doubles =

Doubles
- 1997 DFS Classic
- 1996 Champions: (Australia) Elizabeth Smylie (United States) Linda Wild

Final
- Champions: (United States) Katrina Adams (Latvia) Larisa Savchenko
- Runners-up: (France) Nathalie Tauziat (United States) Linda Wild
- Score: 6–2, 6–3

Details
- Draw: 28
- Seeds: 8

Events
| Singles | Doubles |
| ← 1996 · | Birmingham Classic | · 1998 → |

Elizabeth Smylie and Linda Wild were the defending champions but only Wild competed that year with Nathalie Tauziat.

Tauziat and Wild lost in the final 6–2, 6–3 against Katrina Adams and Larisa Savchenko.

== Seeds ==
Champion seeds are indicated in bold text while text in italics indicates the round in which those seeds were eliminated. The top four seeded teams received byes into the second round.

1. (United States) **Katrina Adams** / (Latvia) **Larisa Savchenko (champions)**
2. (France) Nathalie Tauziat / (United States) Linda Wild (final)
3. (Netherlands) Miriam Oremans / (United States) Lisa Raymond (quarterfinals)
4. (Indonesia) Yayuk Basuki / (United States) Lori McNeil (semifinals)
5. (Japan) Naoko Kijimuta / (Japan) Nana Miyagi (quarterfinals)
6. (France) Alexandra Fusai / (Italy) Rita Grande (quarterfinals)
7. (Italy) Silvia Farina / (Japan) Rika Hiraki (first round)
8. (United States) Debbie Graham / (Australia) Kristine Kunce (second round)

== Draw ==
=== Key ===
- Q = Qualifier
- WC = Wild card
- LL = Lucky loser
- Alt = Alternate
- ITF = ITF entry
- PR = Protected ranking
- SR = Special ranking
- SE = Special exempt
- JE = Junior exempt
- JR = Junior Accelerator Programme entrant
- CO = College Accelerator Programme entrant
- NG = Next Gen Accelerator Program entrant
- w/o = Walkover
- r = Retired
- d = Defaulted

=== Finals ===
Semifinals
1 | **(United States) K Adams** **(Latvia) L Savchenko** | **6** | **6**
4 | (Indonesia) Y Basuki (United States) L McNeil | 4 | 2
WC | (United Kingdom) J Pullin (United Kingdom) L Woodroffe | 2 | 5
2 | **(France) N Tauziat** **(United States) L Wild** | **6** | **7**

Final
1 | (United States) **Katrina Adams** (Latvia) **Larisa Savchenko** | **6** | **6**
2 | (France) Nathalie Tauziat (United States) Linda Wild | 2 | 3

=== Top half ===
First round
(Belgium) N Feber (Canada) S Jeyaseelan | 1 | 4
(Australia) **D Jones** (Thailand) **T Tanasugarn** | **6** | **6**
(Czech Republic) L Cenková (France) N van Lottum | **6** | 3 | 6
(Netherlands) **S Noorlander** (Greece) **C Papadáki** | 2 | **6** | **8**
(Australia) K-A Guse (United States) C Morariu | 2 | **6** | 1
8 | (United States) **D Graham** (Australia) **K Kunce** | **6** | 4 | **6**
(United States) E deLone (Australia) N Pratt | **6** | 4 | 1
(Belgium) **E Callens** (United States) **G Helgeson-Nielsen** | 4 | **6** | **6**
(Croatia) **M Murić** (Japan) **M Saeki** | 5 | **6** | **6**
(South Korea) S-H Park (United States) M Tu | **7** | 3 | 1
(South Africa) M de Swardt (South Africa) L Horn | 3 | **7** | 2
6 | (France) **A Fusai** (Italy) **R Grande** | **6** | 6 | **6**

Second round
1 | (United States) **K Adams** (Latvia) **L Savchenko** | **7** | **7**
(Australia) D Jones (Thailand) T Tanasugarn | 5 | 6
(Netherlands) **S Noorlander** (Greece) **C Papadáki** | **6** | **6**
8 | (United States) D Graham (Australia) K Kunce | 4 | 2
4 | (Indonesia) **Y Basuki** (United States) **L McNeil** | **6** | **6**
(Belgium) E Callens (United States) G Helgeson-Nielsen | 2 | 2
(Croatia) M Murić (Japan) M Saeki | 6 | 3
6 | (France) **A Fusai** (Italy) **R Grande** | **7** | **6**

Quarterfinals
1 | (United States) **K Adams** (Latvia) **L Savchenko** | 3 | **6** | **6**
(Netherlands) S Noorlander (Greece) C Papadáki | **6** | 2 | 2
4 | (Indonesia) **Y Basuki** (United States) **L McNeil** | **6** | **6**
6 | (France) A Fusai (Italy) R Grande | 4 | 4

Semifinals
1 | (United States) **K Adams** (Latvia) **L Savchenko** | **6** | **6**
4 | (Indonesia) Y Basuki (United States) L McNeil | 4 | 2

=== Bottom half ===
First round
7 | (Italy) S Farina (Japan) R Hiraki | 2 | 0
(Argentina) **I Gorrochategui** (Romania) **I Spîrlea** | **6** | **6**
(Argentina) M Paz (France) A-G Sidot | **7** | 5 | 2
WC | (United Kingdom) **J Pullin** (United Kingdom) **L Woodroffe** | 5 | **7** | **6**
(Australia) **C Barclay** (United Kingdom) **C Wood** | **6** | **6**
(Romania) C Cristea (Poland) M Grzybowska | 3 | 4
5 | (Japan) **N Kijimuta** (Japan) **N Miyagi** | **6** | **6**
WC | (United Kingdom) S-A Siddall (United Kingdom) A Wainwright | 3 | 0
(Chinese Taipei) J Lee (Poland) A Olsza | 1 | 3
(Italy) **L Golarsa** (Belgium) **D Van Roost** | **6** | **6**
(Australia) A Ellwood (Australia) R McQuillan | 5 | 4
Q | (Belarus) **O Barabanschikova** (United Kingdom) **S Smith** | **7** | **6**

Second round
(Argentina) I Gorrochategui (Romania) I Spîrlea
WC | (United Kingdom) **J Pullin** (United Kingdom) **L Woodroffe** | **w/o**
(Australia) C Barclay (United Kingdom) C Wood | 1 | 4
3 | (Netherlands) **M Oremans** (United States) **L Raymond** | **6** | **6**
5 | (Japan) **N Kijimuta** (Japan) **N Miyagi** | **7** | **6**
(Italy) L Golarsa (Belgium) D Van Roost | 5 | 3
Q | (Belarus) O Barabanschikova (United Kingdom) S Smith | 4 | 3
2 | (France) **N Tauziat** (United States) **L Wild** | **6** | **6**

Quarterfinals
WC | (United Kingdom) **J Pullin** (United Kingdom) **L Woodroffe** | **6** | **0**
3 | (Netherlands) M Oremans (United States) L Raymond | 3 | 1 | r
5 | (Japan) N Kijimuta (Japan) N Miyagi | 1 | 3
2 | (France) **N Tauziat** (United States) **L Wild** | **6** | **6**

Semifinals
WC | (United Kingdom) J Pullin (United Kingdom) L Woodroffe | 2 | 5
2 | (France) **N Tauziat** (United States) **L Wild** | **6** | **7**

=== Qualifying draw ===
First qualifying round
1 | **(France) L Ghirardi** **(France) S Pitkowski** | **8**
(India) N Vaidyanathan (Germany) M Weingärtner | 6
**(United Kingdom) L Ahl** **(United Kingdom) L Latimer** | **8**
(United Kingdom) C Taylor (United Kingdom) J Ward | 2
WC | **(United Kingdom) H Crook** **(United Kingdom) V Davies** | **8**
(Canada) M Drake (United States) K Pace | 3
**(Belarus) O Barabanschikova** **(United Kingdom) S Smith** | **8**
2 | (Japan) Y Hosoki (Japan) K Nagatomi | 3

Second qualifying round
1 | **(France) L Ghirardi** **(France) S Pitkowski** | **8**
(United Kingdom) L Ahl (United Kingdom) L Latimer | 1
WC | (United Kingdom) H Crook (United Kingdom) V Davies | 1
**(Belarus) O Barabanschikova** **(United Kingdom) S Smith** | **8**

Final qualifying round
1 | (France) L Ghirardi (France) S Pitkowski | 6
**(Belarus) O Barabanschikova** **(United Kingdom) S Smith** | **8**
