= 2000 DFS Classic =

- Date: 12–19 June
- Edition: 19th
- Category: Tier III
- Draw: 56S / 28D
- Prize money: $170,000
- Surface: Grass / Outdoor
- Location: Birmingham, United Kingdom
- Venue: Edgbaston Priory Club

Champions

Singles
- (United States) Lisa Raymond

Doubles
- (Australia) Rachel McQuillan / (Australia) Lisa McShea
← 1999 ·	Birmingham Classic	· 2001 →

The 2000 DFS Classic was a women's tennis tournament played on grass courts at the Edgbaston Priory Club in Birmingham, United Kingdom that was part of Tier III of the 2000 WTA Tour. It was the 19th edition of the tournament and was held from 12 June until 19 June 2000. Sixth-seeded Lisa Raymond won the singles title and earned $27,000 first-prize money.

== Finals ==
=== Singles ===
(United States) Lisa Raymond defeated (Thailand) Tamarine Tanasugarn 6–2, 6–7^{(7–9)}, 6–4

- It was Raymond's first title of the year and the 2nd of her career.

=== Doubles ===
(Australia) Rachel McQuillan / (Australia) Lisa McShea defeated (Zimbabwe) Cara Black / (Kazakhstan) Irina Selyutina 6–3, 7–6^{(7–5)}

- It was McQuillan's first doubles title of the year and the 5th of her career. It was McShea's first doubles title of the year and her career.
