= 2000 DFS Classic – Singles =

Singles
- 2000 DFS Classic

Final
- Champion: (United States) Lisa Raymond
- Runner-up: (Thailand) Tamarine Tanasugarn
- Score: 6–2, 6–7^{(7–9)}, 6–4

Details
- Draw: 56 (8 Q / 3 WC )
- Seeds: 16

Events
Singles	Doubles
← 1999 ·	Birmingham Classic	· 2001 →

Julie Halard-Decugis was the defending champion, but was defeated in the quarterfinals by Tamarine Tanasugarn.

Lisa Raymond won the title, defeating Tanasugarn in the final 6–2, 6–7^{(7–9)}, 6–4.

== Seeds ==
The top eight seeds received a bye into the second round.

1. (France) Nathalie Tauziat (semifinals)
2. (France) Julie Halard-Decugis (quarterfinals)
3. (United States) Jennifer Capriati (quarterfinals)
4. (Croatia) Silvija Talaja (third round)
5. (France) Nathalie Dechy (second round)
6. (United States) Lisa Raymond (champion)
7. (France) Anne-Gaëlle Sidot (quarterfinals)
8. (United States) Kristina Brandi (quarterfinals)
9. (Luxembourg) Anne Kremer (third round)
10. (United States) Alexandra Stevenson (first round)
11. (Russia) Tatiana Panova (first round)
12. (Spain) Magüi Serna (third round)
13. (Australia) Nicole Pratt (second round)
14. (Russia) Anastasia Myskina (third round)
15. (Croatia) Mirjana Lučić (first round)
16. (Thailand) Tamarine Tanasugarn (final)

== Draw ==
Key

- Q = Qualifier
- WC = Wild card
- LL = Lucky loser
- Alt = Alternate
- ITF = ITF entry
- PR = Protected ranking
- SR = Special ranking
- SE = Special exempt
- JE = Junior exempt
- JR = Junior Accelerator Programme entrant
- CO = College Accelerator Programme entrant
- NG = Next Gen Accelerator Program entrant
- w/o = Walkover
- r = Retired
- d = Defaulted

=== Finals ===
Quarterfinals
1	(France) Nathalie Tauziat	7	5	7^{7}
7	(France) Anne-Gaëlle Sidot	5	7	6^{5}
3	(United States) Jennifer Capriati	2	6	5
6	(United States) Lisa Raymond	6	4	7
8	(United States) Kristina Brandi	3	5
(Zimbabwe) Cara Black	6	7
16	(Thailand) Tamarine Tanasugarn	6	6
2	(France) Julie Halard-Decugis	4	4

Semifinals
1	(France) Nathalie Tauziat	4	2
6	(United States) Lisa Raymond	6	6
(Zimbabwe) Cara Black	6^{0}	1
16	(Thailand) Tamarine Tanasugarn	7^{7}	6

Final
6	(United States) Lisa Raymond	6	6^{7}	6
16	(Thailand) Tamarine Tanasugarn	2	7^{9}	4

=== Top half ===
==== Section 1 ====
First round
(United States) E deLone	6	2	6
(United States) J Hopkins	4	6	2
(Germany) B Rittner	7^{7}	3	6
Q	(Denmark) E Dyrberg	6^{3}	6	4
(France) A Cocheteux	2	4
13	(Australia) N Pratt	6	6
15	(Croatia) M Lučić	6^{1}	0
(United States) L Osterloh	7^{7}	6
(Germany) J Kandarr	3	6^{7}
(United States) M Shaughnessy	6	7^{9}
(Canada) V Webb	6	6
(Bulgaria) N Nola	4	4

Second round
1	(France) N Tauziat	6	6
(United States) E deLone	1	1
(Germany) B Rittner	6	2	6
13	(Australia) N Pratt	4	6	3
(United States) L Osterloh	6	7
(United States) M Shaughnessy	3	5
(Canada) V Webb	6	4	2
7	(France) A-G Sidot	3	6	6

Third round
1	(France) N Tauziat	6	6
(Germany) B Rittner	2	2
(United States) L Osterloh	6^{5}	6	4
7	(France) A-G Sidot	7^{7}	1	6

Quarterfinals
1	(France) N Tauziat	7	5	7^{7}
7	(France) A-G Sidot	5	7	6^{5}

==== Section 2 ====
First round
WC	(United Kingdom) L Woodroffe	7	5	6
Q	(Australia) R McQuillan	5	7	3
(United States) H Parkinson	6	1	4
(Venezuela) M-A Vento	1	6	6
WC	(United Kingdom) J Pullin	3	6	4
12	(Spain) M Serna	6	4	6
9	(Luxembourg) A Kremer	3	6^{1}
Q	(United Kingdom) L Ahl	6	7^{7}
Q	(United States) K Po	6	4	6^{4}
Q	(Australia) E Dominikovic	4	6	7^{7}
Q	(United Kingdom) K Cross	6	6
(Croatia) J Kostanić	2	2

Second round
3	(United States) J Capriati	6	7
WC	(United Kingdom) L Woodroffe	1	5
(Venezuela) M-A Vento	6^{5}	6	3
12	(Spain) M Serna	7^{7}	4	6
9	(Luxembourg) A Kremer	4	6	6
Q	(Australia) E Dominikovic	6	4	2
Q	(United Kingdom) K Cross	6	4	2
6	(United States) L Raymond	3	6	6

Third round
3	(United States) J Capriati	2	6	4
12	(Spain) M Serna	6	2	3^{r}
9	(Luxembourg) A Kremer	7^{7}	5	1
6	(United States) L Raymond	6^{4}	7	6

Quarterfinals
3	(United States) J Capriati	2	6	5
6	(United States) L Raymond	6	4	7

=== Bottom half ===
==== Section 3 ====
First round
(Slovenia) K Srebotnik	4	2
(Slovenia) T Pisnik	6	6
(Switzerland) M Vavrinec	5	4
(Netherlands) A Hopmans	7	6
(Belgium) E Callens	4	6^{5}
14	(Russia) A Myskina	6	7^{7}
11	(Russia) T Panova	1	4
(Zimbabwe) C Black	6	6
(Hungary) K Marosi	4	3
(Australia) A Molik	6	6
Q	(Australia) L McShea	4	4
(Switzerland) E Gagliardi	6	6

Second round
8	(United States) K Brandi	7^{7}	6
(Slovenia) T Pisnik	6^{3}	2
(Netherlands) A Hopmans	5	6^{5}
14	(Russia) A Myskina	7	7^{7}
(Zimbabwe) C Black	6	5	6
(Australia) A Molik	3	7	3
(Switzerland) E Gagliardi	6	6^{5}	3
4	(Croatia) S Talaja	4	7^{7}	6

Third round
8	(United States) K Brandi	7	6
14	(Russia) A Myskina	5	2
(Zimbabwe) C Black	6	6
4	(Croatia) S Talaja	3	4

Quarterfinals
8	(United States) K Brandi	3	5
(Zimbabwe) C Black	6	7

==== Section 4 ====
First round
(Russia) L Krasnoroutskaya	6	3	6
Q	(Slovenia) T Križan	2	6	1
(Netherlands) S Noorlander	4	0
WC	(United Kingdom) L Latimer	6	6
(Netherlands) K Boogert	3	6	1
16	(Thailand) T Tanasugarn	6	3	6
10	(United States) A Stevenson	4	6	3
(Japan) S Asagoe	6	3	6
(Russia) N Petrova	6	6
(Canada) J Nejedly	3	4
(Netherlands) M Oremans	6	7^{7}
(Belgium) L Courtois	4	6^{1}

Second round
5	(France) N Dechy	3	3
(Russia) L Krasnoroutskaya	6	6
WC	(United Kingdom) L Latimer	6^{5}	3
16	(Thailand) T Tanasugarn	7^{7}	6
(Japan) S Asagoe	4	6	6
(Russia) N Petrova	6	4	4
(Netherlands) M Oremans	3	2
2	(France) J Halard-Decugis	6	6

Third round
(Russia) L Krasnoroutskaya	5	2
16	(Thailand) T Tanasugarn	7	6
(Japan) S Asagoe	6	4	2
2	(France) J Halard-Decugis	2	6	6

Quarterfinals
16	(Thailand) T Tanasugarn	6	6
2	(France) J Halard-Decugis	4	4
