= 1998 DFS Classic – Singles =

Singles
- 1998 DFS Classic

Final
- Champion: None
- Runner-up: None
- Score: No result due to rain

Details
- Draw: 48 (8 Q / 4 WC )
- Seeds: 16

Events
Singles	Doubles
← 1997 ·	Birmingham Classic	· 1999 →

Nathalie Tauziat was the defending champion and was one of the four semifinalists.

There was no result for the event due to rain. The four semifinalists were Steffi Graf, Tauziat, Elena Likhovtseva and Yayuk Basuki.

== Seeds ==
A champion seed is indicated in bold text while text in italics indicates the round in which that seed was eliminated. All sixteen seeds received a bye to the second round.

1. (Germany) Steffi Graf (semifinals)
2. (Romania) Irina Spîrlea (quarterfinals)
3. (France) Nathalie Tauziat (semifinals)
4. (Belgium) Dominique Van Roost (quarterfinals)
5. (United States) Lisa Raymond (second round)
6. (Indonesia) Yayuk Basuki (semifinals)
7. (Russia) Elena Likhovtseva (semifinals)
8. (Spain) Magüi Serna (quarterfinals)
9. (Poland) Magdalena Grzybowska (third round)
10. (Thailand) Tamarine Tanasugarn (second round)
11. (France) Sarah Pitkowski (second round)
12. (Italy) Rita Grande (third round)
13. (United States) Corina Morariu (third round)
14. (France) Alexandra Fusai (second round)
15. (Argentina) Florencia Labat (second round)
16. n/a
17. (Netherlands) Miriam Oremans (second round)

== Draw ==
=== Key ===
- Q = Qualifier
- WC = Wild card
- LL = Lucky loser
- Alt = Alternate
- SE = Special exempt
- PR = Protected ranking
- ITF = ITF entry
- JE = Junior exempt
- w/o = Walkover
- r = Retired
- d = Defaulted
- SR = Special ranking

=== Finals ===
Quarterfinals
1/WC	(Germany) **Steffi Graf**	**6**	**6**
8	(Spain) Magüi Serna	4	4
3	(France) **Nathalie Tauziat**	**6**	**6**
(Australia) Kerry-Anne Guse	2	3
7	(Russia) **Elena Likhovtseva**	**6**	**6**
4	(Belgium) Dominique Van Roost	3	4
6	(Indonesia) **Yayuk Basuki**	**6**	5	**7**
2	(Romania) Irina Spîrlea	4	**7**	5

Semifinals
1/WC	(Germany) Steffi Graf	can	cel	led
3	(France) Nathalie Tauziat
7	(Russia) Elena Likhovtseva	can	cel	led
6	(Indonesia) Yayuk Basuki

Final

=== Top half ===
==== Section 1 ====
First round
(Chinese Taipei) S-T Wang	**6**	3	2
Q	(Australia) **R Stubbs**	4	**6**	**6**
Q	(Netherlands) **K Boogert**	**7**	**6**
WC	(United Kingdom) L Woodroffe	6	2
(Romania) **C Cristea**	3	5
(France) L Ghirardi	**6**	2	r
(Russia) **T Panova**	**7**	4	**6**
(Spain) G León García	5	**6**	2

Second round
1/WC	(Germany) **S Graf**	5	**6**	**6**
Q	(Australia) R Stubbs	**7**	2	4
Q	(Netherlands) **K Boogert**	**7**	**6**
17	(Netherlands) M Oremans	5	2
13	(United States) **C Morariu**	**6**	**6**
(Romania) C Cristea	1	3
(Russia) T Panova	**6**	3	6
8	(Spain) **M Serna**	4	**6**	**8**

Third round
1/WC	(Germany) **S Graf**	**6**	**6**
Q	(Netherlands) K Boogert	2	4
13	(United States) C Morariu	6	4
8	(Spain) **M Serna**	**7**	**6**

Quarterfinals
1/WC	(Germany) **S Graf**	**6**	**6**
8	(Spain) M Serna	4	4

==== Section 2 ====
First round
Q	(Zimbabwe) **C Black**	**6**	**6**
(Israel) A Smashnova	2	1
(United States) **T Snyder**	**6**	**6**
Q	(Belgium) E Callens	2	2
(Czech Republic) D Chládková	3	5
(Italy) **L Golarsa**	**6**	**7**
(Australia) **K-A Guse**	**6**	**6**
(France) A Cocheteux	1	3

Second round
3	(France) **N Tauziat**	2	**6**	**6**
Q	(Zimbabwe) C Black	**6**	2	1
(United States) T Snyder	3	1
12	(Italy) **R Grande**	**6**	**6**
10	(Thailand) T Tanasugarn	**6**	5	0
(Italy) **L Golarsa**	4	**7**	**6**
(Australia) **K-A Guse**	**6**	3	**6**
5	(United States) L Raymond	3	**6**	1

Third round
3	(France) **N Tauziat**	**6**	**6**
12	(Italy) R Grande	3	0
(Italy) L Golarsa	2	0
(Australia) **K-A Guse**	**6**	**6**

Quarterfinals
3	(France) **N Tauziat**	**6**	**6**
(Australia) K-A Guse	2	3

=== Bottom half ===
==== Section 3 ====
First round
(Belarus) **O Barabanschikova**	**7**	1	**6**
(Australia) N Pratt	6	**6**	3
Q	(United States) E deLone	2	3
(Latvia) **L Neiland**	**6**	**6**
(South Africa) **M de Swardt**	**6**	**6**
WC	(United Kingdom) K Cross	4	1
(Japan) M Saeki	6	**6**	2
LL	(United States) **K Miller**	**7**	2	**6**

Second round
7	(Russia) **E Likhovtseva**	3	**6**	**6**
(Belarus) O Barabanschikova	**6**	1	4
(Latvia) **L Neiland**	**7**	**6**
14	(France) A Fusai	5	2
15	(Argentina) F Labat	2	**6**	8
(South Africa) **M de Swardt**	**6**	4	**10**
LL	(United States) K Miller	4	0
4	(Belgium) **D Van Roost**	**6**	**6**

Third round
7	(Russia) **E Likhovtseva**	6	**6**	3
(Latvia) L Neiland	**7**	1	0^{r}
(South Africa) M de Swardt	5	3
4	(Belgium) **D Van Roost**	**7**	**6**

Quarterfinals
7	(Russia) **E Likhovtseva**	**6**	**6**
4	(Belgium) D Van Roost	3	4

==== Section 4 ====
First round
Q	(Japan) S Asagoe	4	5
(France) **N Dechy**	**6**	**7**
WC	(United Kingdom) **S Smith**	**6**	**7**
(Australia) R McQuillan	2	5
(Czech Republic) **S Kleinová**	**6**	**6**
(Spain) C Torrens Valero	3	0
Q	(Canada) M Drake	**6**	4	2
Q	(Australia) **K Kunce**	4	**6**	**6**

Second round
6	(Indonesia) **Y Basuki**	1	**6**	**6**
(France) N Dechy	**6**	3	3
WC	(United Kingdom) **S Smith**	**7**	**6**
11	(France) S Pitkowski	6	3
9	(Poland) **M Grzybowska**	4	**6**	**6**
(Czech Republic) S Kleinová	**6**	4	0
Q	(Australia) K Kunce	4	2
2	(Romania) **I Spîrlea**	**6**	**6**

Third round
6	(Indonesia) **Y Basuki**	3	**6**	**6**
WC	(United Kingdom) S Smith	**6**	1	2
9	(Poland) M Grzybowska	4	4
2	(Romania) **I Spîrlea**	**6**	**6**

Quarterfinals
6	(Indonesia) **Y Basuki**	**6**	5	**7**
2	(Romania) I Spîrlea	4	**7**	5
