= 2001 DFS Classic – Singles =

Singles
- 2001 DFS Classic

Final
- Champion: (France) Nathalie Tauziat
- Runner-up: (Netherlands) Miriam Oremans
- Score: 6–3, 7–5

Details
- Draw: 56 (8 Q / 3 WC )
- Seeds: 16

Events
Singles	Doubles
← 2000 ·	Birmingham Classic	· 2002 →

In the 2001 DFS Classic women's tennis tournament, Lisa Raymond was the defending singles champion, but was defeated in the semifinals by Nathalie Tauziat.

Tauziat went on to win the title, defeating Miriam Oremans in the final 6–3, 7–5.

== Seeds ==
A champion seed is indicated in bold text while text in italics indicates the round in which that seed was eliminated. The top eight seeds received a bye to the second round.

1. (France) **Nathalie Tauziat (champion)**
2. (Federal Republic of Yugoslavia) Jelena Dokić (second round)
3. (Spain) Magüi Serna (second round)
4. (United States) Lisa Raymond (semifinals)
5. (Thailand) Tamarine Tanasugarn (third round)
6. (Luxembourg) Anne Kremer (quarterfinals)
7. (Russia) Elena Likhovtseva (quarterfinals)
8. (Japan) Ai Sugiyama (second round)
9. (Zimbabwe) Cara Black (third round)
10. (Germany) Marlene Weingärtner (first round)
11. (United States) Meilen Tu (second round)
12. (Puerto Rico) Kristina Brandi (quarterfinals)
13. (Czech Republic) Dája Bedáňová (first round)
14. (France) Nathalie Dechy (first round)
15. (France) Anne-Gaëlle Sidot (second round)
16. (United States) Lilia Osterloh (first round)

== Draw ==
=== Key ===
- Q = Qualifier
- WC = Wild card
- LL = Lucky loser
- Alt = Alternate
- SE = Special exempt
- PR = Protected ranking
- ITF = ITF entry
- JE = Junior exempt
- w/o = Walkover
- r = Retired
- d = Defaulted
- SR = Special ranking

=== Finals ===
Quarterfinals
1	(France) **Nathalie Tauziat**	**6**	**6**
6	(Luxembourg) Anne Kremer	4	0
4	(United States) **Lisa Raymond**	**7^{7}**	**6**
7	(Russia) Elena Likhovtseva	6^{5}	4
(France) Virginie Razzano	4	0
(Slovakia) **Daniela Hantuchová**	**6**	**6**
12	(Puerto Rico) Kristina Brandi	4	3
(Netherlands) **Miriam Oremans**	**6**	**6**

Semifinals
1	(France) **Nathalie Tauziat**	**6**	**7^{7}**
4	(United States) Lisa Raymond	0	6^{5}
(Slovakia) Daniela Hantuchová	**6**	4	5
(Netherlands) **Miriam Oremans**	2	**6**	**7**

Final
1	(France) **Nathalie Tauziat**	**6**	**7**
(Netherlands) Miriam Oremans	3	5

=== Top half ===
==== Section 1 ====
First round
(Slovakia) **Ľ Cervanová**	4	**6**	**7^{7}**
(Tunisia) S Sfar	**6**	4	6^{2}
(Russia) L Krasnoroutskaya	4	5
Q	(United States) **A Stevenson**	**6**	**7**
LL	(Japan) S Obata	3	4
15	(France) **A-G Sidot**	**6**	**6**
10	(Germany) M Weingärtner	3	4
(Australia) **R McQuillan**	**6**	**6**
(United States) J Hopkins	**6**	5	6^{4}
WC	(United Kingdom) **L Ahl**	2	**7**	**7^{7}**
(Austria) **S Plischke**	**7**	**6**
Q	(United Kingdom) H Collin	5	4

Second round
1	(France) **N Tauziat**	**6**	**6**
(Slovakia) Ľ Cervanová	4	1
Q	(United States) **A Stevenson**	**6**	**6**
15	(France) A-G Sidot	3	2
(Australia) R McQuillan	**6**	6^{11}	6^{1}
WC	(United Kingdom) **L Ahl**	1	**7^{13}**	**7^{7}**
(Austria) S Plischke	5	**7^{7}**	1
6	(Luxembourg) **A Kremer**	**7**	6^{5}	**6**

Third round
1	(France) **N Tauziat**	**6**	**6**
Q	(United States) A Stevenson	3	3
WC	(United Kingdom) L Ahl	3	0
6	(Luxembourg) **A Kremer**	**6**	**6**

Quarterfinals
1	(France) **N Tauziat**	**6**	**6**
6	(Luxembourg) A Kremer	4	0

==== Section 2 ====
First round
(Italy) **R Grande**	**6**	**6**
(Russia) N Petrova	4	4
LL	(Netherlands) K Boogert	4	4
Q	(Italy) **A Serra Zanetti**	**6**	**6**
(Russia) **A Myskina**	**6**	4	**6**
16	(United States) L Osterloh	3	**6**	3
11	(United States) **M Tu**	**7**	2	**6**
Q	(Canada) M Drake	5	**6**	3
WC	(United Kingdom) J Pullin	3	**6**	2
(Slovenia) **T Pisnik**	**6**	3	**6**
Q	(Japan) **R Fujiwara**	**6**	2	**6**
Q	(Japan) Y Yoshida	3	**6**	1

Second round
4	(United States) **L Raymond**	**6**	**6**
(Italy) R Grande	3	3
Q	(Italy) A Serra Zanetti	**6**	6^{5}	3
(Russia) **A Myskina**	1	**7^{7}**	**6**
11	(United States) M Tu	4	**6**	6^{4}
(Slovenia) **T Pisnik**	**6**	1	**7^{7}**
Q	(Japan) R Fujiwara	3	2
7	(Russia) **E Likhovtseva**	**6**	**6**

Third round
4	(United States) **L Raymond**	1	**6**	**7^{7}**
(Russia) A Myskina	**6**	2	6^{5}
(Slovenia) T Pisnik	**6**	4	3
7	(Russia) **E Likhovtseva**	4	**6**	**6**

Quarterfinals
4	(United States) **L Raymond**	**7^{7}**	**6**
7	(Russia) E Likhovtseva	6^{5}	4

=== Bottom half ===
==== Section 3 ====
First round
(France) **V Razzano**	**6**	**7^{7}**
(Germany) J Kandarr	4	6^{5}
Q	(Canada) **V Webb**	**6**	**7**
(Venezuela) M Vento	3	5
(United States) J Craybas	6^{2}	3
9	(Zimbabwe) **C Black**	**7^{7}**	**6**
14	(France) N Dechy	**6**	4	3
(Slovakia) **D Hantuchová**	4	**6**	**6**
Q	(Greece) **E Daniilidou**	**6**	**6**
(Japan) S Asagoe	3	3
(Croatia) S Talaja	2	1
(Australia) **N Pratt**	**6**	**6**

Second round
8	(Japan) A Sugiyama	2	4
(France) **V Razzano**	**6**	**6**
Q	(Canada) V Webb	4	4
9	(Zimbabwe) **C Black**	**6**	**6**
(Slovakia) **D Hantuchová**	**6**	**6**
Q	(Greece) E Daniilidou	2	3
(Australia) **N Pratt**	**6**	**6**
3	(Spain) M Serna	4	2

Third round
(France) **V Razzano**	**6**	6^{4}	**7^{7}**
9	(Zimbabwe) C Black	3	**7^{7}**	6^{3}
(Slovakia) **D Hantuchová**	**6**	**6**
(Australia) N Pratt	4	4

Quarterfinals
(France) V Razzano	4	0
(Slovakia) **D Hantuchová**	**6**	**6**

==== Section 4 ====
First round
WC	(United Kingdom) **L Woodroffe**	**6**	5	**7^{7}**
(Bulgaria) L Bacheva	2	**7**	6^{5}
(United States) M Irvin	5	5
(Italy) **F Schiavone**	**7**	**7**
(Russia) E Bovina	4	3
12	(Puerto Rico) **K Brandi**	**6**	**6**
13	(Czech Republic) D Bedáňová	3	**6**	6^{1}
(Netherlands) **M Oremans**	**6**	4	**7^{7}**
(Australia) **E Dominikovic**	**6**	2	**6**
(Switzerland) M Vavrinec	3	**6**	2
(Australia) **A Molik**	**6**	**7**
(United States) D Buth	2	5

Second round
5	(Thailand) **T Tanasugarn**	**6**	**3**
WC	(United Kingdom) L Woodroffe	4	0	r
(Italy) F Schiavone	3	**6**	2
12	(Puerto Rico) **K Brandi**	**6**	2	**6**
(Netherlands) **M Oremans**	**6**	**6**
(Australia) E Dominikovic	1	4
(Australia) **A Molik**	4	**6**	**6**
2	(Federal Republic of Yugoslavia) J Dokić	**6**	3	3

Third round
5	(Thailand) T Tanasugarn	2	5
12	(Puerto Rico) **K Brandi**	**6**	**7**
(Netherlands) **M Oremans**	6^{8}	**6**	**7^{7}**
(Australia) A Molik	**7^{10}**	2	6^{4}

Quarterfinals
12	(Puerto Rico) K Brandi	4	3
(Netherlands) **M Oremans**	**6**	**6**
