= 1997 DFS Classic =

- Date: 9–15 June
- Edition: 16th
- Category: Tier III
- Draw: 56S / 28D
- Prize money: $164,250
- Surface: Grass / outdoor
- Location: Birmingham, United Kingdom
- Venue: Edgbaston Priory Club

Champions

Singles
- (France) Nathalie Tauziat

Doubles
- (United States) Katrina Adams / (Latvia) Larisa Savchenko
← 1996 ·	Birmingham Classic	· 1998 →

The 1997 DFS Classic was a women's tennis tournament played on grass courts at the Edgbaston Priory Club in Birmingham in the United Kingdom that was part of the Tier III category of the 1997 WTA Tour. It was the 16th edition of the tournament and was held from 9 June until 15 June 1997. Second-seeded Nathalie Tauziat won the singles title.

== Finals ==
=== Singles ===
(France) Nathalie Tauziat defeated (Indonesia) Yayuk Basuki 2–6, 6–2, 6–2

- It was Tauziat's only singles title of the year and the 4th of her career.

=== Doubles ===
(United States) Katrina Adams / (Latvia) Larisa Savchenko defeated (France) Nathalie Tauziat / (United States) Linda Wild 6–2, 6–3

- It was Adams' only doubles title of the year and the 20th and last of her career. It was Savchenko's 1st doubles title of the year and the 59th of her career.
