= 1998 DFS Classic =

- Date: 8–14 June
- Edition: 17th
- Category: Tier III
- Draw: 56S / 28D
- Surface: Grass / outdoor
- Location: Birmingham, United Kingdom
- Venue: Edgbaston Priory Club

Champions

Singles
- The singles final was cancelled due to rain

Doubles
- (Belgium) Els Callens / (France) Julie Halard-Decugis
← 1997 ·	Birmingham Classic	· 1999 →

The 1998 DFS Classic was a women's tennis tournament played on grass courts at the Edgbaston Priory Club in Birmingham in the United Kingdom that was part of Tier III of the 1998 WTA Tour. The tournament was held from 8 June until 14 June 1998.

== Finals ==
=== Singles ===
- The singles final was cancelled due to rain.

=== Doubles ===
(Belgium) Els Callens / (France) Julie Halard-Decugis defeated (United States) Lisa Raymond / (Australia) Rennae Stubbs 2–6, 6–4, 6–4

- It was Callens' first title of the year and the 2nd of her career. It was Halard-Decugis' first title of the year and the 10th of her career.
