= 1999 DFS Classic – Singles =

Singles
- 1999 DFS Classic

Final
- Champion: (France) Julie Halard-Decugis
- Runner-up: (France) Nathalie Tauziat
- Score: 6–2, 3–6, 6–4

Details
- Draw: 48 (8 Q / 3 WC )
- Seeds: 16

Events
Singles	Doubles
← 1998 ·	Birmingham Classic	· 2000 →

There was no defending champion, due to the cancellation of the semifinals in 1998 due to rain.

Julie Halard-Decugis won the title, defeating compatriots Nathalie Tauziat in the final 6–2, 3–6, 6–4.

== Seeds ==
All sixteen seeds received a bye to the second round.

1. (France) Nathalie Tauziat (final)
2. (France) Sandrine Testud (second round)
3. (Belgium) Dominique Van Roost (second round)
4. (Belarus) Natasha Zvereva (quarterfinals)
5. (France) Julie Halard-Decugis (champion)
6. (Spain) Magüi Serna (semifinals)
7. (France) Nathalie Dechy (second round)
8. (Zimbabwe) Cara Black (semifinals)
9. (United States) Corina Morariu (second round)
10. (United States) Lisa Raymond (second round)
11. (Luxembourg) Anne Kremer (second round)
12. (France) Anne-Gaëlle Sidot (third round)
13. (United States) Tara Snyder (second round)
14. (South Africa) Mariaan de Swardt (third round)
15. (Netherlands) Miriam Oremans (third round)
16. (Colombia) Fabiola Zuluaga (second round)

== Draw ==
=== Key ===
- Q = Qualifier
- WC = Wild card
- LL = Lucky loser
- Alt = Alternate
- SE = Special exempt
- PR = Protected ranking
- ITF = ITF entry
- JE = Junior exempt
- w/o = Walkover
- r = Retired
- d = Defaulted
- SR = Special ranking

=== Finals ===
Quarterfinals
1	(France) Nathalie Tauziat	6	7^{7}
PR	(United States) Nicole Arendt	4	6^{0}
Q	(United States) Alexandra Stevenson	1	0^{r}
6	(Spain) Magüi Serna	6	1
5	(France) Julie Halard-Decugis	4	6	6
4	(Belarus) Natasha Zvereva	6	4	2
8	(Zimbabwe) Cara Black	4	7	6
Q	(Argentina) Inés Gorrochategui	6	5	2

Semifinals
1	(France) Nathalie Tauziat	6	4	6
6	(Spain) Magüi Serna	3	6	3
5	(France) Julie Halard-Decugis	6	6
8	(Zimbabwe) Cara Black	4	4

Final
1	(France) Nathalie Tauziat	2	6	4
5	(France) Julie Halard-Decugis	6	3	6

=== Top half ===
==== Section 1 ====
First round
(United States) K Brandi	6	6
(United Kingdom) S Smith	2	3
(France) A Fusai	6	1	6
Q	(Australia) A Molik	4	6	8
(Croatia) M Lučić	0	7	5
(Croatia) S Talaja	6	5	7
PR	(United States) N Arendt	6	7
WC	(United Kingdom) J Pullin	2	5

Second round
1	(France) N Tauziat	6	6
(United States) K Brandi	2	2
Q	(Australia) A Molik	4	6	1
14	(South Africa) M de Swardt	6	4	6
16	(Colombia) F Zuluaga	3	3
(Croatia) S Talaja	6	6
PR	(United States) N Arendt	6	6
7	(France) N Dechy	3	4

Third round
1	(France) N Tauziat	6	6
14	(South Africa) M de Swardt	3	4
(Croatia) S Talaja	2	6	1
PR	(United States) N Arendt	6	2	6

Quarterfinals
1	(France) N Tauziat	6	7^{7}
PR	(United States) N Arendt	4	6^{0}

==== Section 2 ====
First round
Q	(United States) A Stevenson	6	6
WC	(United Kingdom) L Latimer	4	3
(Belarus) O Barabanschikova	7	3	4
Q	(Australia) K-A Guse	5	6	6
(France) A Cocheteux	1	1
(Thailand) T Tanasugarn	6	6
(Spain) Á Montolio	6	7
(United States) M Shaughnessy	2	5

Second round
3	(Belgium) D Van Roost	4	3
Q	(United States) A Stevenson	6	6
Q	(Australia) K-A Guse	6	3	4
12	(France) A-G Sidot	4	6	6
10	(United States) L Raymond	6	6^{4}	5
(Thailand) T Tanasugarn	1	7^{7}	7
(Spain) Á Montolio	1	5
6	(Spain) M Serna	6	7

Third round
Q	(United States) A Stevenson	6	5	8
12	(France) A-G Sidot	3	7	6
(Thailand) T Tanasugarn	2	2
6	(Spain) M Serna	6	6

Quarterfinals
Q	(United States) A Stevenson	1	0^{r}
6	(Spain) M Serna	6	1

=== Bottom half ===
==== Section 3 ====
First round
(Ukraine) E Tatarkova	6	4	7
(Greece) C Papadáki	0	6	5
(Belgium) S Appelmans	6	6
WC	(United Kingdom) J Ward	3	2
Q	(Australia) J Dokić	6	3	7
(Italy) R Grande	2	6	9
(Switzerland) E Gagliardi	6	6
(Hungary) R Kuti-Kis	3	0

Second round
5	(France) J Halard-Decugis	6	6
(Ukraine) E Tatarkova	1	2
(Belgium) S Appelmans	4	4
15	(Netherlands) M Oremans	6	6
11	(Luxembourg) A Kremer	6	6^{3}	3
(Italy) R Grande	2	7^{7}	6
(Switzerland) E Gagliardi	4	1
4	(Belarus) N Zvereva	6	6

Third round
5	(France) J Halard-Decugis	6	6
15	(Netherlands) M Oremans	2	4
(Italy) R Grande	4	2
4	(Belarus) N Zvereva	6	6

Quarterfinals
5	(France) J Halard-Decugis	4	6	6
4	(Belarus) N Zvereva	6	4	2

==== Section 4 ====
First round
(France) É Loit	5	0
(Netherlands) A Hopmans	7	6
(United States) K Po	6	6
Q	(Germany) M Schnitzer	2	4
Q	(Germany) J Kandarr	3	6	3
Q	(Argentina) I Gorrochategui	6	3	6
(Australia) N Pratt	4	6	6
Q	(United States) E deLone	6	1	0

Second round
8	(Zimbabwe) C Black	7^{7}	6
(Netherlands) A Hopmans	6^{1}	2
(United States) K Po	6	6
9	(United States) C Morariu	4	3
13	(United States) T Snyder	7^{7}	3	0
Q	(Argentina) I Gorrochategui	6^{3}	6	6
(Australia) N Pratt	6	6
2	(France) S Testud	3	3

Third round
8	(Zimbabwe) C Black	7^{7}	6
(United States) K Po	6^{5}	3
Q	(Argentina) I Gorrochategui	6	6
(Australia) N Pratt	1	4

Quarterfinals
8	(Zimbabwe) C Black	4	7	6
Q	(Argentina) I Gorrochategui	6	5	2

== Qualifying ==
=== Seeds ===
1. (Slovenia) Katarina Srebotnik (first round)
2. (Netherlands) Kristie Boogert (qualifying competition)
3. (Czech Republic) Sandra Kleinová (first round)
4. (Federal Republic of Yugoslavia) Sandra Naćuk (qualifying competition)
5. (Japan) Miho Saeki (first round)
6. (Australia) Alicia Molik (Qualifier)
7. (Bulgaria) Lubomira Bacheva (qualifying competition)
8. (Italy) Laura Golarsa (qualifying competition)

=== Qualifiers ===
1. (Germany) Miriam Schnitzer
2. (Australia) Alicia Molik
3. (United States) Alexandra Stevenson
4. (Australia) Jelena Dokić
5. (Argentina) Inés Gorrochategui
6. (Germany) Jana Kandarr
7. (Australia) Kerry-Anne Guse
8. (United States) Erika deLone

== Qualifying draw ==
=== Key ===
- Q = Qualifier
- WC = Wild card
- LL = Lucky loser
- Alt = Alternate
- SE = Special exempt
- PR = Protected ranking
- ITF = ITF entry
- JE = Junior exempt
- w/o = Walkover
- r = Retired
- d = Defaulted
- SR = Special ranking

=== First qualifier ===
First round
1	(Slovenia) Katarina Srebotnik	4	5
(South Africa) Surina De Beer	6	7
(Germany) Miriam Schnitzer	1	7^{7}	8
(Poland) Aleksandra Olsza	6	6^{2}	6

Qualifying competition
(South Africa) Surina De Beer	6	2	5
(Germany) Miriam Schnitzer	3	6	7

=== Second qualifier ===
First round
(Brazil) Vanessa Menga	4	3
(Australia) Evie Dominikovic	6	6
WC	(United Kingdom) Lucie Ahl	4	6^{8}
6	(Australia) Alicia Molik	6	7^{10}

Qualifying competition
(Australia) Evie Dominikovic	3	2
6	(Australia) Alicia Molik	6	6

=== Third qualifier ===
First round
3	(Czech Republic) Sandra Kleinová	3	2
(Slovakia) Daniela Hantuchová	6	6
(Kazakhstan) Irina Selyutina	3	4
(United States) Alexandra Stevenson	6	6

Qualifying competition
(Slovakia) Daniela Hantuchová	4	6	3
(United States) Alexandra Stevenson	6	3	6

=== Fourth qualifier ===
First round
(South Africa) Liezel Horn	2	7^{7}	1
(Australia) Jelena Dokić	6	6^{2}	6
WC	(United Kingdom) Lorna Woodroffe	6^{5}	4
7	(Bulgaria) Lubomira Bacheva	7^{7}	6

Qualifying competition
(Australia) Jelena Dokić	6	7^{11}
7	(Bulgaria) Lubomira Bacheva	4	6^{9}

=== Fifth qualifier ===
First round
5	(Japan) Miho Saeki	4	5
(Japan) Shinobu Asagoe	6	7
(United Kingdom) Karen Cross	6	3	1
(Argentina) Inés Gorrochategui	3	6	6

Qualifying competition
(Japan) Shinobu Asagoe	2	2
(Argentina) Inés Gorrochategui	6	6

=== Sixth qualifier ===
First round
WC	(United Kingdom) Kate Warne-Holland	4	2
(Germany) Jana Kandarr	6	6
(Japan) Nana Miyagi	4	2
4	(Federal Republic of Yugoslavia) Sandra Naćuk	6	6

Qualifying competition
(Germany) Jana Kandarr	6	7
4	(Federal Republic of Yugoslavia) Sandra Naćuk	2	5

=== Seventh qualifier ===
First round
8	(Italy) Laura Golarsa	2	2
(United States) Jill Craybas	6	6
(Australia) Kerry-Anne Guse	6	6
(United States) Linda Wild	3	3

Qualifying competition
(United States) Jill Craybas	1	0
(Australia) Kerry-Anne Guse	6	6

=== Eighth qualifier ===
First round
(United States) Erika deLone	6	6
(United States) Karin Miller	1	2
(United Kingdom) Abigail Tordoff	1	5
2	(Netherlands) Kristie Boogert	6	7

Qualifying competition
(United States) Erika deLone	4	6	8
2	(Netherlands) Kristie Boogert	6	3	6
