= 1997 DFS Classic – Singles =

Singles
- 1997 DFS Classic

Final
- Champion: (France) Nathalie Tauziat
- Runner-up: (Indonesia) Yayuk Basuki
- Score: 2–6, 6–2, 6–2

Details
- Draw: 56 (8 Q / 3 WC )
- Seeds: 16

Events
| Singles | Doubles |
| ← 1996 · | Birmingham Classic | · 1998 → |

Meredith McGrath was the defending champion, but did not participate this year.

Nathalie Tauziat won the title, defeating Yayuk Basuki in the final 2–6, 6–2, 6–2.

== Seeds ==
A champion seed is indicated in bold text while text in italics indicates the round in which that seed was eliminated. The top eight seeds received a bye to the second round.

1. (Romania) Irina Spîrlea (semifinals)
2. (France) **Nathalie Tauziat (Champion)**
3. (United States) Lisa Raymond (quarterfinals)
4. (Indonesia) Yayuk Basuki (final)
5. (France) Anne-Gaëlle Sidot (third round)
6. (Belgium) Dominique Van Roost (quarterfinals)
7. (Bulgaria) Magdalena Maleeva (quarterfinals)
8. (Belarus) Natasha Zvereva (quarterfinals)
9. (United States) Linda Wild (first round)
10. (Italy) Silvia Farina (first round)
11. (Belgium) Els Callens (second round)
12. (France) Alexandra Fusai (second round)
13. (Thailand) Tamarine Tanasugarn (second round)
14. (Netherlands) Miriam Oremans (third round)
15. (France) Sarah Pitkowski (first round)
16. (Latvia) Larisa Neiland (second round)

== Draw ==
=== Key ===
- Q = Qualifier
- WC = Wild card
- LL = Lucky loser
- Alt = Alternate
- ITF = ITF entry
- PR = Protected ranking
- SR = Special ranking
- SE = Special exempt
- JE = Junior exempt
- JR = Junior Accelerator Programme entrant
- CO = College Accelerator Programme entrant
- NG = Next Gen Accelerator Program entrant
- w/o = Walkover
- r = Retired
- d = Defaulted

=== Finals ===
Quarterfinals
1 | **(Romania) Irina Spîrlea** | **6** | **6**
6 | (Belgium) Dominique Van Roost | 4 | 4
4 | **(Indonesia) Yayuk Basuki** | **7** | **6**
7 | (Bulgaria) Magdalena Maleeva | 6 | 2
Q | **(Australia) Kristine Kunce** | **6** | 6 | **6**
3 | (United States) Lisa Raymond | 4 | **7** | 3
8 | (Belarus) Natalia Zvereva | 1 | **6** | 2
2 | **(France) Nathalie Tauziat** | **6** | 2 | **6**

Semifinals
1 | (Romania) Irina Spîrlea | 6 | 1
4 | **(Indonesia) Yayuk Basuki** | **7** | **6**
Q | (Australia) Kristine Kunce | 4 | 4
2 | (France) **Nathalie Tauziat** | **6** | **6**

Final
4 | (Indonesia) Yayuk Basuki | **6** | 2 | 2
2 | (France) **Nathalie Tauziat** | 2 | **6** | **6**

=== Top half ===
==== Section 1 ====
First round
(Australia) **R McQuillan** | **6** | **6**
(Croatia) S Talaja | 1 | 3
(Poland) A Olsza | 4 | 4
(Czech Republic) **S Kleinová** | **6** | **6**
(United States) **N Arendt** | **6** | 4 | **6**
9 | (United States) L Wild | 3 | **6** | 2
16 | (Latvia) **L Savchenko** | 5 | **6** | **6**
(Italy) R Grande | **7** | 1 | 2
(United States) **G Helgeson-Nielsen** | **6** | **6**
Q | (United States) J Chi | 4 | 0
WC | (United Kingdom) **L Ahl** | **6** | **6**
Q | (United Kingdom) C Taylor | 4 | 1

Second round
1 | (Romania) **I Spîrlea** | **7** | **7**
(Australia) R McQuillan | 5 | 6
(Czech Republic) S Kleinová | 4 | **6** | 3
(United States) **N Arendt** | **6** | 3 | **6**
16 | (Latvia) L Savchenko | 3 | 4
(United States) **G Helgeson-Nielsen** | **6** | **6**
WC | (United Kingdom) L Ahl | 5 | 2
6 | (Belgium) **D Van Roost** | **7** | **6**

Third round
1 | (Romania) **I Spîrlea** | **6** | **6**
(United States) N Arendt | 3 | 4
(United States) G Helgeson-Nielsen | 2 | 4
6 | (Belgium) **D Van Roost** | **6** | **6**

Quarterfinals
1 | (Romania) **I Spîrlea** | **6** | **6**
6 | (Belgium) D Van Roost | 4 | 4

==== Section 2 ====
First round
(Japan) **N Kijimuta** | 3 | **6** | **9**
(United States) L McNeil | **6** | 4 | 7
(United States) **S Cacic** | **6** | **6**
WC | (United Kingdom) S-A Siddall | 3 | 4
(United States) C Morariu | 3 | **6** | 6
11 | (Belgium) **E Callens** | **6** | 4 | **8**
13 | (Thailand) **T Tanasugarn** | **6** | **7**
(United States) M Tu | 3 | 5
Q | (Italy) **L Golarsa** | 4 | **6** | **6**
Q | (France) L Ghirardi | **6** | 3 | 3
(Czech Republic) **L Cenková** | **7** | **7**
(Russia) T Panova | 6 | 5

Second round
4 | (Indonesia) **Y Basuki** | **6** | **6**
(Japan) N Kijimuta | 1 | 1
(United States) **S Cacic** | **6** | **7**
11 | (Belgium) E Callens | 3 | 6
13 | (Thailand) T Tanasugarn | 3 | 4
Q | (Italy) **L Golarsa** | **6** | **6**
(Czech Republic) L Cenková | 2 | 1
7 | (Bulgaria) **M Maleeva** | **6** | **6**

Third round
4 | (Indonesia) **Y Basuki** | **6** | 4 | **6**
(United States) S Cacic | 1 | **6** | 1
Q | (Italy) L Golarsa | **7** | 1 | 4
7 | (Bulgaria) **M Maleeva** | 6 | **6** | **6**

Quarterfinals
4 | (Indonesia) **Y Basuki** | **7** | **6**
7 | (Bulgaria) M Maleeva | 6 | 2

=== Bottom half ===
==== Section 3 ====
First round
(Romania) **C Cristea** | 6 | **7** | **6**
(Switzerland) E Gagliardi | **7** | 6 | 3
Q | (Australia) **K Kunce** | **6** | **6**
Q | (Germany) M Weingärtner | 2 | 2
(Germany) **W Probst** | 1 | **6** | **6**
10 | (Italy) S Farina | **6** | 4 | 2
14 | (Netherlands) **M Oremans** | **6** | 3 | **6**
(Poland) M Grzybowska | 3 | **6** | 0
(Spain) **M Serna** | **6** | **7**
LL | (Belgium) N Feber | 4 | 6
WC | (United Kingdom) **S Smith** | **6** | **6**
Q | (South Korea) S-H Park | 4 | 4

Second round
5 | (France) **A-G Sidot** | **6** | 4 | **6**
(Romania) C Cristea | 4 | **6** | 1
Q | (Australia) **K Kunce** | **6** | **6**
(Germany) W Probst | 2 | 1
14 | (Netherlands) **M Oremans** | **6** | **6**
(Spain) M Serna | **6** | **6**
WC | (United Kingdom) S Smith | 6 | 4
3 | (United States) **L Raymond** | **7** | **6**

Third round
5 | (France) A-G Sidot | 4 | 2
Q | (Australia) **K Kunce** | **6** | **6**
14 | (Netherlands) M Oremans | 3 | 6
3 | (United States) **L Raymond** | **6** | **7**

Quarterfinals
Q | (Australia) **K Kunce** | **6** | 6 | **6**
3 | (United States) L Raymond | 4 | **7** | 3

==== Section 4 ====
First round
(Australia) **K-A Guse** | **6** | **6**
(Australia) A Ellwood | 0 | 0
(Japan) R Hiraki | **6** | 6 | 3
(Spain) **C Torrens Valero** | 1 | **7** | **6**
(France) N van Lottum | 1 | **6** | 4
12 | (France) **A Fusai** | **6** | 4 | **6**
15 | (France) S Pitkowski | 3 | **6** | 1
(Czech Republic) **D Chládkova** | **6** | 4 | **6**
(Belarus) **O Barabanschikova** | **6** | 5 | **6**
Q | (Australia) S Drake-Brockman | 4 | **7** | 1
(Japan) M Saeki | 3 | 6
(Puerto Rico) **K Brandi** | **6** | **7**

Second round
8 | (Belarus) **N Zvereva** | **6** | **6**
(Australia) K-A Guse | 2 | 4
(Spain) **C Torrens Valero** | **6** | **6**
12 | (France) A Fusai | 3 | 2
(Czech Republic) D Chládková | 6 | **6** | 7
(Belarus) **O Barabanschikova** | **7** | 4 | **9**
(Puerto Rico) K Brandi | 1 | 4
2 | (France) **N Tauziat** | **6** | **6**

Third round
8 | (Belarus) **N Zvereva** | **6** | **6**
(Spain) C Torrens Valero | 2 | 3
(Belarus) O Barabanschikova | 5 | 1
2 | (France) **N Tauziat** | **7** | **6**

Quarterfinals
8 | (Belarus) N Zvereva | 1 | **6** | 2
2 | (France) **N Tauziat** | **6** | 2 | **6**
