= 1999 DFS Classic =

- Date: 7–13 June
- Edition: 18th
- Category: Tier III
- Draw: 48S / 28D
- Prize money: $180,000
- Surface: Grass / outdoor
- Location: Birmingham, United Kingdom
- Venue: Edgbaston Priory Club

Champions

Singles
- (France) Julie Halard-Decugis

Doubles
- (United States) Corina Morariu / (Latvia) Larisa Neiland
← 1998 ·	Birmingham Classic	· 2000 →

The 1999 DFS Classic was a women's tennis tournament played on grass courts at the Edgbaston Priory Club in Birmingham in the United Kingdom that was part of Tier III of the 1999 WTA Tour. The tournament was held from 7 June until 13 June 1999. Fifth-seeded Julie Halard-Decugis won the singles title.

== Finals ==
=== Singles ===
(France) Julie Halard-Decugis defeated (France) Nathalie Tauziat, 6–2, 3–6, 6–4

- It was Halard-Decugis' second title of the year and the 10th of her career.

=== Doubles ===
(United States) Corina Morariu / (Latvia) Larisa Neiland defeated (France) Alexandra Fusai / (Argentina) Inés Gorrochategui, 6–4, 6–4

== Entrants ==
=== Seeds ===
Country	Player	Rank	Seed
FRA	Nathalie Tauziat	9	1
FRA	Sandrine Testud	11	2
BEL	Dominique Van Roost	14	3
BLR	Natasha Zvereva	15	4
FRA	Julie Halard-Decugis	19	5
ESP	Magüi Serna	26	6
FRA	Nathalie Dechy	29	7
ZIM	Cara Black	32	8
USA	Corina Morariu	33	9
USA	Lisa Raymond	38	10
LUX	Anne Kremer	40	11
FRA	Anne-Gaëlle Sidot	43	12
USA	Tara Snyder	44	13
RSA	Mariaan de Swardt	46	14
NED	Miriam Oremans	47	15
COL	Fabiola Zuluaga	48	16

=== Other entrants ===
The following players received wildcards into the singles main draw:

- (United Kingdom) Julie Pullin
- (United Kingdom) Louise Latimer
- (United Kingdom) Joanne Ward

The following players received wildcards into the doubles main draw:

- (United Kingdom) Julie Pullin / (United Kingdom) Lorna Woodroffe
- (South Africa) Surina de Beer / (United Kingdom) Samantha Smith

The following players received entry from the singles qualifying draw:

- (Australia) Alicia Molik
- (United States) Alexandra Stevenson
- (Australia) Kerry-Anne Guse
- (Australia) Jelena Dokić
- (Germany) Miriam Schnitzer
- (Germany) Jana Kandarr
- (Argentina) Inés Gorrochategui
- (United States) Erika deLone
