= 2001 DFS Classic =

- Date: 11–17 June
- Edition: 20th
- Category: Tier III
- Draw: 56S / 28D
- Surface: Grass / outdoor
- Location: Birmingham, United Kingdom
- Venue: Edgbaston Priory Club

Champions

Singles
- (France) Nathalie Tauziat

Doubles
- (Zimbabwe) Cara Black / (Russia) Elena Likhovtseva
← 2000 ·	Birmingham Classic	· 2002 →

The 2001 DFS Classic was a women's tennis tournament played on grass courts at the Edgbaston Priory Club in Birmingham in the United Kingdom that was part of Tier III of the 2001 WTA Tour. It was the 20th edition of the tournament and was held from 11 June until 17 June 2001. First-seeded Nathalie Tauziat won the singles title.

== Finals ==
=== Singles ===
(France) Nathalie Tauziat defeated (Netherlands) Miriam Oremans 6–3, 7–5

- It was Tauziat's 2nd title of the year and the 31st of her career.

=== Doubles ===
(Zimbabwe) Cara Black / (Russia) Elena Likhovtseva defeated (United States) Kimberly Po-Messerli / (France) Nathalie Tauziat 6–1, 6–2

- It was Black's 4th title of the year and the 6th of her career. It was Likhovtseva's 4th title of the year and the 13th of her career.
