= Helen Crook =

British tennis player

- Country (sports): Great Britain
- Born: 20 November 1971 (age 54) Essex, England
- Height: 1.75 cm (5 ft 9 in)
- Plays: Right handed
- College: University of South Carolina
- Prize money: $98,388

Singles
- Career record: 140–161
- Career titles: 0
- Highest ranking: No. 257 (16 July 2001)

Doubles
- Career record: 192–178
- Career titles: 0 WTA, 11 ITF
- Highest ranking: No. 155 (24 May 1999)

Grand Slam doubles results
- Wimbledon: 2R (2003)

Grand Slam mixed doubles results
- Wimbledon: 1R (2001, 2003)

Helen Crook (born 20 November 1971) is a British former professional tennis player.

== Biography ==
Before turning professional, Crook attended college in the United States, as a journalism student at the University of South Carolina. She formed a doubles partnership in college tennis with another British player, Victoria Davies. The pair made the semifinals of the 1994 NCAA Doubles Championships.

Crook, who was based in Essex, began competing on the international circuit in 1996. All of her WTA Tour and Wimbledon main-draw appearances were in doubles, a format in which she reached No. 155 in the world. She made two WTA Tour doubles quarterfinals, both with regular doubles partner Victoria Davies, at the 1999 Warsaw Cup and the 2001 Birmingham Classic. She featured in the women's doubles at Wimbledon on eight occasions and twice in mixed doubles. Her only grand slam win came when partnering Anna Hawkins at the 2003 Wimbledon Championships, with the pair overcoming Barbara Schett and Patty Schnyder, before being beaten in the second round by Martina Navratilova and Svetlana Kuznetsova.

She was one of the founders of GB Tennis Girls, an organisation supporting women's tennis. As of 2024, she and Davies ran an LTA Coach Development Centre, and were partners in a tennis academy. She has also played Padel for the GB Senior team.

== ITF Circuit finals ==
=== Singles (0–2) ===
$50,000 tournaments
$40,000 tournaments
$25,000 tournaments
$10,000 tournaments

| Result | No. | Date | Location | Surface | Opponent | Score |
|---|---|---|---|---|---|---|
| Loss | 1. | 17 January 1996 | Miami, United States | Hard | (Russia) Alina Jidkova | 2–6, 5–7 |
| Loss | 2. | 23 July 2000 | Frinton-on-Sea, Great Britain | Grass | (United Kingdom) Samantha Smith | 3–6, 0–6 |

=== Doubles (11–15) ===
| Result | No. | Date | Location | Surface | Partner | Opponents | Score |
|---|---|---|---|---|---|---|---|
| Win | 1. | 11 July 1994 | Frinton-on-Sea, Great Britain | Grass | (United Kingdom) Victoria Davies | (Russia) Natalia Egorova (Russia) Svetlana Parkhomenko | 6–3, 6–2 |
| Loss | 2. | 10 July 1995 | Felixstowe, Great Britain | Grass | (United Kingdom) Victoria Davies | (Australia) Robyn Mawdsley (Australia) Shannon Peters | 1–6, 1–6 |
| Win | 3. | 28 August 1995 | Istanbul, Turkey | Hard | (United Kingdom) Victoria Davies | (Turkey) Duygu Akşit Oal (Hungary) Zsofia Csapó | 6–4, 6–4 |
| Win | 4. | 27 January 1996 | Istanbul, Turkey | Hard (i) | (United Kingdom) Victoria Davies | (United Kingdom) Frances Hearn (United Kingdom) Leyla Ogan | 7–6^{(3)}, 7–6^{(4)} |
| Win | 5. | 26 April 1996 | Edinburgh, Great Britain | Clay | (United Kingdom) Victoria Davies | (United Kingdom) Julie Pullin (United Kingdom) Lorna Woodroffe | 6–2, 6–0 |
| Loss | 6. | 1 June 1996 | Istanbul, Turkey | Hard | (United Kingdom) Victoria Davies] | (United Kingdom) Emily Bond (Italy) Emanuela Brusati | 6–7^{(4)}, 4–6 |
| Loss | 7. | 11 July 1997 | Felixstowe, Great Britain | Grass | (United Kingdom) Victoria Davies | (South Africa) Surina De Beer (United Kingdom) Lizzie Jelfs | 5–7, 5–7 |
| Win | 8. | 26 September 1997 | Sunderland, Great Britain | Carpet (i) | (South Africa) Mareze Joubert | (United Kingdom) Victoria Davies (Israel) Limor Gabai | 6–2, 6–4 |
| Win | 9. | 6 December 1997 | Pretoria, South Africa | Hard | (South Africa) Mareze Joubert | (South Africa) Lucinda Gibbs (South Africa) Giselle Swart | 6–2, 7–5 |
| Loss | 10. | 26 March 1998 | Wodonga, Australia | Grass | (United Kingdom) Victoria Davies | (Australia) Lisa McShea (Australia) Alicia Molik | 4–6, 4–6 |
| Win | 11. | 19 April 1998 | Cagnes-sur-Mer, France | Clay | (United Kingdom) Victoria Davies | (Netherlands) Yvette Basting (Czech Republic) Magdalena Zděnovcová | 6–3, 6–3 |
| Loss | 12. | 31 July 1998 | Ilkley, Great Britain | Grass | (United Kingdom) Victoria Davies | (United Kingdom) Lizzie Jelfs (South Africa) Mareze Joubert | 3–6, 4–6 |
| Loss | 13. | 26 September 1998 | Sunderland, Great Britain | Hard (i) | (United Kingdom) Victoria Davies | (United Kingdom) Lizzie Jelfs (South Africa) Mareze Joubert | 1–6, 1–6 |
| Loss | 14. | 3 October 1998 | Glasgow, Great Britain | Hard (i) | (United Kingdom) Victoria Davies | (Denmark) Eva Dyrberg (Germany) Lydia Steinbach | 4–6, 7–5, 3–6 |
| Loss | 15. | 2 April 2000 | Pontevedra, Spain | Hard | (United Kingdom) Victoria Davies | (Netherlands) Natasha Galouza (Argentina) Vanesa Krauth | 3–6, 6–2, 2–6 |
| Loss | 16. | 23 April 2000 | San Luis Potosí, Mexico | Clay | (United Kingdom) Victoria Davies | (Argentina) María Fernanda Landa (Argentina) Romina Ottoboni | 4–6, 6–7^{(7)} |
| Loss | 17. | 14 May 2000 | Tampico, Mexico | Hard | (United Kingdom) Victoria Davies | (Mexico) Melody Falcó (Brazil) Carla Tiene | 4–6, 3–6 |
| Win | 18. | 22 July 2000 | Frinton-on-Sea, Great Britain | Grass | (United Kingdom) Victoria Davies | (South Africa) Mareze Joubert (Australia) Nicole Sewell | 6–2, 6–4 |
| Win | 19. | 3 February 2001 | Tipton, Great Britain | Hard (i) | (United Kingdom) Victoria Davies | (Greece) Eleni Daniilidou (Bulgaria) Maria Geznenge | 2–6, 6–4, 6–4 |
| Loss | 20. | 20 May 2001 | Edinburgh, Great Britain | Clay | (United Kingdom) Victoria Davies | (United Kingdom) Julie Pullin (United Kingdom) Lorna Woodroffe | 2–6, 1–6 |
| Loss | 21. | 10 February 2002 | Redbridge, Great Britain | Hard (i) | (China) Sun Tiantian | (Romania) Magda Mihalache (Russia) Ekaterina Sysoeva | 6–4, 4–6, 4–6 |
| Win | 22. | 8 March 2003 | Nuevo Laredo, Mexico | Hard | (Greece) Christina Zachariadou | (Germany) Caroline-Ann Basu (France) Kildine Chevalier | 6–3, 4–6, 6–2 |
| Win | 23. | 22 March 2003 | Monterrey, Mexico | Hard | (Greece) Christina Zachariadou | (Germany) Caroline-Ann Basu (France) Kildine Chevalier | 6–2, 6–0 |
| Loss | 24. | 12 April 2003 | Coatzacoalcos, Mexico | Hard | (Greece) Christina Zachariadou | (Argentina) Erica Krauth (Australia) Sarah Stone | 4–6, 6–4, 4–6 |
| Loss | 25. | 15 February 2004 | Sunderland, Great Britain | Hard (i) | (Germany) Martina Müller | (Republic of Ireland) Claire Curran (Netherlands) Kim Kilsdonk | 4–6, 6–3, 3–6 |
| Loss | 26. | 11 July 2004 | Felixstowe, Great Britain | Grass | (United Kingdom) Karen Paterson | (United Kingdom) Hannah Collin (United Kingdom) Anna Hawkins | 4–6, 4–6 |
