= Victoria Davies =

British tennis player

- Country (sports): United Kingdom
- Born: 7 August 1972 (age 53)
- Height: 168 cm (5 ft 6 in)
- Plays: Right handed (one handed backhand)
- College: University of South Carolina
- Prize money: $56,624

Singles
- Career record: 55–115
- Highest ranking: No. 465 (15 May 2000)

Doubles
- Career record: 168–147
- Career titles: 8 ITF
- Highest ranking: No. 169 (7 June 1999)

Grand Slam doubles results
- Wimbledon: 1R (1996, 1998, 1999, 2000, 2001, 2002)

Grand Slam mixed doubles results
- Wimbledon: 1R (2001, 2002)

Victoria Davies (born 7 August 1972) is a British former professional tennis player.

Davies, who comes from Bridgend, South Wales, played college tennis in the United States for the University of South Carolina. She was a doubles semifinalist at the 1994 NCAA Doubles Championships, partnering Helen Crook.

On the professional tour she featured most successfully as a doubles player, winning eight titles on the ITF Women's Circuit. She played main-draw doubles in six editions of the Wimbledon Championships.

As of 2024, she and Crook ran an LTA Coach Development Centre, and were partners in a tennis academy. She has also played Padel for the GB Senior team.

== ITF Circuit finals ==
$25,000 tournaments
$10,000 tournaments

=== Doubles (8–15) ===
Outcome	No.	Date	Location	Surface	Partner	Opponents	Score
Winner	1.	11 July 1994	Frinton-on-Sea, Great Britain	Grass	(United Kingdom) Helen Crook	(Russia) Natalia Egorova (Russia) Svetlana Parkhomenko	6–3, 6–2
Runner-up	1.	10 July 1995	Felixstowe, Great Britain	Grass	(United Kingdom) Helen Crook	(Australia) Robyn Mawdsley (Australia) Shannon Peters	1–6, 1–6
Winner	2.	28 August 1995	Istanbul, Turkey	Hard	(United Kingdom) Helen Crook	(Turkey) Duygu Akşit Oal (Hungary) Zsofia Csapó	6–4, 6–4
Winner	3.	27 January 1996	Istanbul, Turkey	Hard (i)	(United Kingdom) Helen Crook	(United Kingdom) Frances Hearn (United Kingdom) Leyla Ogan	7–6^{(3)}, 7–6^{(4)}
Winner	4.	26 April 1996	Edinburgh, Great Britain	Clay	(United Kingdom) Helen Crook	(United Kingdom) Julie Pullin (United Kingdom) Lorna Woodroffe	6–2, 6–0
Runner-up	2.	1 June 1996	Istanbul, Turkey	Hard	(United Kingdom) Helen Crook	(United Kingdom) Emily Bond (Italy) Emanuela Brusati	6–7^{(4)}, 4–6
Runner-up	3.	11 July 1997	Felixstowe, Great Britain	Grass	(United Kingdom) Helen Crook	(South Africa) Surina De Beer (United Kingdom) Lizzie Jelfs	5–7, 5–7
Runner-up	4.	26 September 1997	Sunderland, Great Britain	Carpet (i)	(Israel) Limor Gabai	(United Kingdom) Helen Crook (South Africa) Mareze Joubert	2–6, 4–6
Runner-up	5.	26 March 1998	Wodonga, Australia	Grass	(United Kingdom) Helen Crook	(Australia) Lisa McShea (Australia) Alicia Molik	4–6, 4–6
Winner	5.	19 April 1998	Cagnes-sur-Mer, France	Clay	(United Kingdom) Helen Crook	(Netherlands) Yvette Basting (Czech Republic) Magdalena Zděnovcová	6–3, 6–3
Runner-up	6.	31 July 1998	Ilkley, Great Britain	Grass	(United Kingdom) Helen Crook	(United Kingdom) Lizzie Jelfs (South Africa) Mareze Joubert	3–6, 4–6
Runner-up	7.	26 September 1998	Sunderland, Great Britain	Hard (i)	(United Kingdom) Helen Crook	(United Kingdom) Lizzie Jelfs (South Africa) Mareze Joubert	1–6, 1–6
Runner-up	8.	3 October 1998	Glasgow, Great Britain	Hard (i)	(United Kingdom) Helen Crook	(Denmark) Eva Dyrberg (Germany) Lydia Steinbach	4–6, 7–5, 3–6
Runner-up	9.	25 April 1999	Hatfield, Great Britain	Clay	(United Kingdom) Kate Warne-Holland	(South Africa) Mareze Joubert (France) Stephanie Testard	1–6, 4–6
Winner	6.	2 May 1999	Hatfield, Great Britain	Clay	(United Kingdom) Kate Warne-Holland	(Russia) Natalia Egorova (Ukraine) Anna Zaporozhanova	7–5, 6–1
Runner-up	10.	11 July 1999	Felixstowe, Great Britain	Grass	(United Kingdom) Kate Warne-Holland	(New Zealand) Leanne Baker (Australia) Nicole Sewell	1–6, 4–6
Runner-up	11.	2 April 2000	Pontevedra, Spain	Hard	(United Kingdom) Helen Crook	(Netherlands) Natasha Galouza (Argentina) Vanesa Krauth	3–6, 6–2, 2–6
Runner-up	12.	23 April 2000	San Luis Potosí, Mexico	Clay	(United Kingdom) Helen Crook	(Argentina) María Fernanda Landa (Argentina) Romina Ottoboni	4–6, 6–7^{(7)}
Runner-up	13.	14 May 2000	Tampico, Mexico	Hard	(United Kingdom) Helen Crook	(Mexico) Melody Falcó (Brazil) Carla Tiene	4–6, 3–6
Winner	7.	22 July 2000	Frinton-on-Sea, Great Britain	Grass	(United Kingdom) Helen Crook	(South Africa) Mareze Joubert (Australia) Nicole Sewell	6–2, 6–4
Winner	8.	3 February 2001	Tipton, Great Britain	Hard (i)	(United Kingdom) Helen Crook	(Greece) Eleni Daniilidou (Bulgaria) Maria Geznenge	2–6, 6–4, 6–4
Runner-up	14.	20 May 2001	Edinburgh, Great Britain	Clay	(United Kingdom) Helen Crook	(United Kingdom) Julie Pullin (United Kingdom) Lorna Woodroffe	2–6, 1–6
Runner-up	15.	6 May 2002	Edinburgh, United Kingdom	Clay	(Czech Republic) Eva Martincová	(Republic of Ireland) Kelly Liggan (Spain) Conchita Martínez Granados	7–5, 0–6, 1–6
