= Lisa McShea =

Australian tennis player

- Country (sports): Australia
- Residence: Scarborough, Australia
- Born: 29 October 1974 (age 50); Redcliffe, Australia
- Height: 1.74 m (5 ft 8 1/2 in)
- Turned pro: 1 January 1996
- Retired: 2006
- Plays: Right-handed
- Prize money: $514,068

Singles
- Career record: 272–224
- Career titles: 0 WTA, 9 ITF
- Highest ranking: No. 139 (31 July 2000)

Grand Slam singles results
- Australian Open: 1R (1994, 2000)
- Wimbledon: 1R (1999)

Doubles
- Career record: 439–203
- Career titles: 4 WTA, 56 ITF
- Highest ranking: No. 32 (17 January 2005)

Grand Slam doubles results
- Australian Open: 3R (2001)
- French Open: 2R (2004)
- Wimbledon: QF (2001)
- US Open: 3R (2003)

Lisa McShea (born 29 October 1974) is an Australian former tennis player. She played professionally from 1996 to 2006. As a junior player, McShea won the 1992 Wimbledon Championships doubles title. She was also more successful in doubles during her professional career, winning four WTA Tour and 56 ITF doubles events.

== Biography ==
McShea was born in Redcliffe, Queensland to Ed and Lois McShea, and is the oldest of four children. She has a sister, Catherine, and brothers Andrew and Danny. Her entire family plays tennis. McShea, who was coached by Paul Campbell, resides in Scarborough, Australia.

McShea played at Grand Slam events in three occasions. She played at the Australian Open in 1994 and 2000, and at Wimbledon in 1999, but was unable to pass the first round. In doubles, her best Grand Slam result was the quarterfinals of the 2001 Wimbledon Championships – along with Rachel McQuillan, she defeated the third seeds Cara Black and Elena Likhovtseva en route to the quarterfinals, where they lost to the ninth seeds Kim Clijsters and Ai Sugiyama. At the same tournament, McShea reached the mixed doubles quarterfinals partnering with Bob Bryan.

She played for Australia Fed Cup team once, during the 2004 World Group Playoffs. Partnering with Christina Wheeler, she defeated the doubles team of Thailand. Her highest career rankings are world No. 139 in singles, achieved on 31 July 2000, and No. 32 in doubles, achieved on 17 January 2005.

== WTA Tour finals ==
=== Doubles: 6 (4 titles, 2 runner-ups) ===
Legend
Tier I (0–0)
Tier II (0–0)
Tier III (4–1)
Tier IV & V (0–1)

Result	W/L	Date	Championship	Surface	Partner	Opponents	Score
Win	1–0	Jun 2000	Birmingham Classic, UK	Grass	(Australia) Rachel McQuillan	(Zimbabwe) Cara Black (Kazakhstan) Irina Selyutina	6–3, 7–6^{(5)}
Loss	1–1	Jan 2004	Canberra Classic, Australia	Hard	(France) Caroline Dhenin	(Croatia) Jelena Kostanić (Luxembourg) Claudine Schaul	6–4, 7–6^{(3)}
Win	2–1	Mar 2004	Mexican Open	Clay	(Venezuela) Milagros Sequera	(Czech Republic) Olga Blahotová (Czech Republic) Gabriela Navrátilová	2–6, 7–6^{(5)}, 6–4
Win	3–1	May 2004	Strasbourg, France	Clay	(Venezuela) Milagros Sequera	(Slovenia) Tina Križan (Slovenia) Katarina Srebotnik	6–4, 6–1
Loss	3–2	Jun 2004	Birmingham Classic, UK	Grass	(Venezuela) Milagros Sequera	(Russia) Maria Kirilenko (Russia) Maria Sharapova	2–6, 1–6
Win	4–2	Jun 2004	Rosmalen Open, Netherlands	Grass	(Venezuela) Milagros Sequera	(Croatia) Jelena Kostanić (Luxembourg) Claudine Schaul	7–6^{(3)}, 6–3

== ITF finals ==
$75,000 tournaments
$50,000 tournaments
$25,000 tournaments
$10,000 tournaments

=== Singles: 18 (9–9) ===
Result	No.	Date	Tournament	Surface	Opponent	Score
Loss	1.	10 October 1993	ITF Ibaraki, Japan	Hard (i)	(Japan) Yuka Yoshida	6–3, 2–6, 5–7
Win	1.	31 October 1993	ITF Kyoto, Japan	Hard	(Japan) Kazue Takuma	6–3, 6–2
Win	2.	1 May 1994	ITF Woking, United Kingdom	Hard	(United States) Ingrid Kurta	6–1, 6–4
Win	3.	31 May 1997	ITF Bundaberg, Australia	Hard	(South Africa) Nannie de Villiers	6–4, 6–2
Loss	2.	14 March 1998	ITF Wodonga, Australia	Grass	(Australia) Alicia Molik	3–6, 2–6
Loss	3.	3 May 1998	ITF Bundaberg, Australia	Clay	(Australia) Melissa Beadman	4–6, 2–6
Loss	4.	10 May 1998	ITF Maryborough, Australia	Clay	(Romania) Mira Radu	3–6, 4–6
Loss	5.	18 July 1998	ITF Frinton, United Kingdom	Grass	(United Kingdom) Lucie Ahl	w/o
Win	4.	11 October 1998	ITF Dalby, Australia	Hard	(United States) Dawn Buth	7–6^{(7)}, 5–7, 6–2
Win	5.	18 October 1998	ITF Kooralbyn, Australia	Hard	(Australia) Cindy Watson	6–4, 5–7, 7–6
Loss	6.	28 February 1999	Bendigo International, Australia	Hard	(Australia) Kerry-Anne Guse	1–6, 6–4, 4–6
Loss	7.	7 March 1999	ITF Warrnambool, Australia	Grass	(Australia) Kerry-Anne Guse	2–6, 6–7^{(6)}
Loss	8.	10 March 2002	ITF Warrnambool, Australia	Grass	(Australia) Nicole Sewell	4–6, 6–3, 6–7^{(5)}
Win	6.	17 March 2002	ITF Benalla, Australia	Grass	(Australia) Deanna Roberts	7–5, 4–6, 6–4
Loss	9.	24 March 2002	ITF Yarrawonga, Australia	Grass	(Australia) Beti Sekulovski	6–7^{(4)}, 6–1, 4–6
Win	7.	31 March 2002	Bendigo International, Australia	Grass	(Germany) Svenja Weidemann	6–1, 6–4
Win	8.	16 March 2003	ITF Benalla, Australia	Grass	(United Kingdom) Sarah Borwell	6–1, 6–4
Win	9.	30 March 2003	ITF Albury, Australia	Grass	(Thailand) Napaporn Tongsalee	6–2, 6–3

=== Doubles: 84 (56–28) ===
Outcome	No.	Date	Tournament	Surface	Partner	Opponents	Score
Runner-up	1.	20 April 1992	ITF Nottingham, UK	Hard	(United States) Amy deLone	(Canada) Mélanie Bernard (Canada) Caroline Delisle	3–6, 5–7
Winner	2.	27 April 1992	ITF Sheffield, UK	Clay	(United States) Amy deLone	(United Kingdom) Amanda Evans (Russia) Svetlana Parkhomenko	6–4, 6–1
Runner-up	3.	28 September 1992	ITF Ibaraki, Japan	Hard	(United States) Amy deLone	(Japan) Yuko Hosoki (Japan) Naoko Kijimuta	3–6, 2–2 ret.
Runner-up	4.	28 June 1993	ITF Velp, Netherlands	Clay	(Australia) Maija Avotins	(Czech Republic) Martina Hautová (Czech Republic) Lenka Nemecková	5–7, 5–7
Runner-up	5.	12 July 1993	ITF Frinton, UK	Grass	(Australia) Maija Avotins	(Russia) Natalia Egorova (Russia) Svetlana Parkhomenko	6–4, 2–6, 6–7
Runner-up	6.	2 August 1993	ITF Norfolk, US	Hard	(Australia) Maija Avotins	(United States) Varalee Sureephong (Canada) Vanessa Webb	6–7, 4–6
Runner-up	7.	10 October 1993	ITF Ibaraki, Japan	Hard (i)	(Australia) Maija Avotins	(Japan) Hiroko Mochizuki (Japan) Yuka Tanaka	6–4, 3–6, 6–7
Winner	8.	31 October 1993	ITF Kyoto, Japan	Hard	(Australia) Maija Avotins	(Japan) Mana Endo (Japan) Masako Yanagi	7–6^{(5)}, 7–5
Winner	9.	15 November 1993	ITF Port Pirie, Australia	Hard	(Canada) Vanessa Webb	(Slovenia) Tina Križan (Czech Republic) Eva Martincová	7–6^{(5)}, 6–3
Winner	10.	25 April 1994	ITF Woking, UK	Hard	(Australia) Annabel Ellwood	(Australia) Shannon Peters (Netherlands) Caroline Stassen	3–6, 6–4, 6–0
Winner	11.	9 March 1996	ITF Warrnambool, Australia	Grass	(Australia) Joanne Limmer	(Australia) Gail Biggs (Australia) Nicole Oomens	6–7^{(6)}, 6–3, 6–3
Runner-up	12.	16 March 1996	ITF Victoria, Australia	Carpet (i)	(Australia) Joanne Limmer	(Australia) Trudi Musgrave (Australia) Jane Taylor	4–6, 7–5, 4–6
Runner-up	13.	31 March 1996	ITF Albury, Australia	Grass	(Australia) Joanne Limmer	(Australia) Trudi Musgrave (Australia) Jane Taylor	0–6, 3–6
Runner-up	14.	23 June 1996	ITF Peachtree, US	Hard	(Australia) Joanne Limmer	(United States) Erica Adams (Georgia (country)) Nino Louarsabishvili	3–6, 6–7^{(4)}
Winner	15.	7 July 1996	ITF Williamsburg, US	Hard	(Australia) Joanne Limmer	(United States) Ania Bleszynski (United States) Katie Schlukebir	6–1, 6–1
Winner	16.	14 July 1996	ITF Easton, US	Hard	(Australia) Joanne Limmer	(United States) Audra Brannon (United States) Kristin Osmond	7–5, 6–2
Winner	17.	13 October 1996	ITF Ibaraki, Japan	Hard	(Australia) Gail Biggs	(Japan) Keiko Nagatomi (Japan) Yuka Tanaka	7–5, 6–3
Winner	18.	20 October 1996	ITF Kugayama, Japan	Hard	(Australia) Gail Biggs	(Japan) Keiko Nagatomi (Japan) Kiyoko Yazawa	6–0, 6–2
Runner-up	19.	28 October 1996	ITF Kyoto, Japan	Carpet (i)	(Australia) Gail Biggs	(Japan) Keiko Nagatomi (Japan) Yuka Tanaka	6–7^{(4)}, 6–2, 2–6
Winner	20.	10 November 1996	ITF Mount Gambier, Australia	Hard	(Australia) Joanne Limmer	(Australia) Catherine Barclay (Australia) Kirrily Sharpe	6–4, 2–6, 7–5
Runner-up	21.	17 November 1996	ITF Port Pirie, Australia	Hard	(Australia) Joanne Limmer	(Australia) Catherine Barclay (Australia) Kirrily Sharpe	6–7^{(5)}, 6–7^{(6)}
Runner-up	22.	15 December 1996	ITF Hope Island, Australia	Hard	(Australia) Joanne Limmer	(Australia) Catherine Barclay (Australia) Kerry-Anne Guse	4–6, 4–6
Runner-up	23.	9 March 1997	ITF Warrnambool, Australia	Grass	(Australia) Joanne Limmer	(South Africa) Nannie de Villiers (United Kingdom) Shirli-Ann Siddall	4–6, 6–4, 6–7^{(5)}
Winner	24.	26 April 1997	ITF Dalby, Australia	Hard	(South Africa) Nannie de Villiers	(Australia) Jenny-Ann Fetch (Australia) Renee Reid	6–0, 6–3
Winner	25.	3 May 1997	ITF Kooralbyn, Australia	Hard	(South Africa) Nannie de Villiers	(Australia) Jenny-Ann Fetch (Australia) Renee Reid	6–7^{(4)}, 6–1, 6–3
Winner	26.	10 May 1997	ITF Hope Island, Australia	Hard	(South Africa) Nannie de Villiers	(Australia) Jenny-Ann Fetch (Australia) Renee Reid	6–4, 6–4
Runner-up	27.	17 May 1997	ITF Caboolture, Australia	Clay	(South Africa) Nannie de Villiers	(Japan) Shinobu Asagoe (Thailand) Benjamas Sangaram	4–6, 5–7
Runner-up	28.	24 May 1997	ITF Gympie, Australia	Clay	(South Africa) Nannie de Villiers	(Japan) Shinobu Asagoe (Thailand) Benjamas Sangaram	7–5, 3–6, 3–6
Winner	29.	31 May 1997	ITF Bundaberg, Australia	Clay	(South Africa) Nannie de Villiers	(Japan) Shinobu Asagoe (Thailand) Benjamas Sangaram	4–6, 6–1, 6–1
Winner	30.	7 June 1997	ITF Ipswich, Australia	Clay	(South Africa) Nannie de Villiers	(Japan) Shinobu Asagoe (Thailand) Benjamas Sangaram	6–4, 3–6, 7–5
Winner	31.	13 July 1997	ITF Easton, US	Hard	(South Africa) Nannie de Villiers	(United States) Marissa Catlin (United States) Karin Miller	6–0, 3–6, 6–2
Winner	32.	17 August 1997	Bronx Open, US	Hard	(Australia) Rachel McQuillan	(United Kingdom) Shirli-Ann Siddall (United Kingdom) Lorna Woodroffe	6–2, 6–1
Winner	33.	5 October 1997	ITF Santa Clara, US	Hard	(South Africa) Nannie de Villiers	(Australia) Rachel McQuillan (Japan) Nana Smith	7–6^{(3)}, 7–6^{(5)}
Runner-up	34.	19 October 1997	ITF Indian Wells, US	Hard	(South Africa) Nannie de Villiers	(Australia) Kristine Kunce (Australia) Rachel McQuillan	5–7, 4–6
Winner	35.	23 November 1997	ITF Port Pirie, Australia	Hard	(South Africa) Nannie de Villiers	(Poland) Aleksandra Olsza (South Africa) Jessica Steck	6–4, 6–3
Runner-up	36.	30 November 1997	ITF Nuriootpa, Australia	Hard	(South Africa) Nannie de Villiers	(Australia) Catherine Barclay (Australia) Kerry-Anne Guse	3–6, 5–7
Winner	37.	2 March 1998	ITF Warrnambool, Australia	Grass	(Australia) Alicia Molik	(Australia) Gail Biggs (New Zealand) Shelley Stephens	6–3, 6–1
Winner	38.	14 March 1998	ITF Wodonga, Australia	Grass	(Australia) Alicia Molik	(United Kingdom) Helen Crook (United Kingdom) Victoria Davies	6–4, 6–4
Winner	39.	23 March 1998	ITF Canberra, Australia	Carpet (i)	(Australia) Alicia Molik	(Australia) Melissa Beadman (Australia) Bryanne Stewart	7–6^{(5)}, 6–7^{(11)}, 7–5
Winner	40.	27 March 1998	ITF Corowa, Australia	Grass	(Australia) Alicia Molik	(Japan) Tomoe Hotta (Czech Republic) Monika Maštalířová	6–0, 6–0
Winner	41.	27 April 1998	ITF Caboolture, Australia	Clay	(Czech Republic) Monika Maštalířová	(Australia) Melissa Beadman (Australia) Bryanne Stewart	2–6, 7–6^{(5)}, 7–5
Winner	42.	10 May 1998	ITF Maryborough, Australia	Clay	(Czech Republic) Monika Maštalířová	(Thailand) Suvimol Duangchan (Thailand) Marissa Niroj	6–4, 6–0
Winner	43.	11 July 1998	ITF Felixstowe, UK	Grass	(Australia) Trudi Musgrave	(United Kingdom) Lucie Ahl (United Kingdom) Amanda Wainwright	6–4, 7–6^{(4)}
Runner-up	44.	26 July 1998	ITF Dublin, Ireland	Carpet	(Australia) Trudi Musgrave	(Germany) Kirstin Freye (Spain) Alicia Ortuño	w/o
Winner	45.	11 October 1998	ITF Dalby, Australia	Hard	(Australia) Trudi Musgrave	(United States) Dawn Buth (Australia) Kylie Hunt	4–6, 7–5, 6–4
Winner	46.	18 October 1998	ITF Kooralbyn, Australia	Hard	(Australia) Trudi Musgrave	(Australia) Gail Biggs (New Zealand) Shelley Stephens	6–3, 7–6^{(5)}
Runner-up	47.	25 October 1998	ITF Gold Coast, Australia	Hard	(Australia) Trudi Musgrave	(Australia) Catherine Barclay (Australia) Kerry-Anne Guse	4–6, 2–6
Winner	48.	28 February 1999	Bendigo International, Australia	Hard	(Australia) Kerry-Anne Guse	(Australia) Trudi Musgrave (Australia) Cindy Watson	6–4, 6–1
Runner-up	49.	18 April 1999	Las Vegas Open, US	Hard	(Japan) Rika Hiraki	(United States) Erika deLone (Australia) Annabel Ellwood	6–7, 2–6
Winner	50.	3 May 1999	ITF Sarasota, US	Clay	(Australia) Annabel Ellwood	(Canada) Renata Kolbovic (United States) Karin Miller	7–5, 7–6^{(3)}
Winner	51.	1 August 1999	ITF Salt Lake City, US	Hard	(Australia) Rachel McQuillan	(Australia) Annabel Ellwood (Canada) Sonya Jeyaseelan	6–3, 4–6, 6–3
Winner	52.	10 October 1999	ITF Dalby, Australia	Hard	(Australia) Kerry-Anne Guse	(Australia) Kylie Hunt (Indonesia) Wynne Prakusya	6–3, 5–7, 6–4
Winner	53.	17 October 1999	ITF Queensland, Australia	Hard	(Australia) Kerry-Anne Guse	(Australia) Alicia Molik (Australia) Bryanne Stewart	6–1, 3–6, 7–5
Winner	54.	24 October 1999	ITF Gold Coast, Australia	Hard	(Australia) Kerry-Anne Guse	(Japan) Rika Hiraki (Australia) Trudi Musgrave	6–2, 6–3
Winner	55.	5 December 1999	ITF Port Pirie, Australia	Hard	(Australia) Kerry-Anne Guse	(Czech Republic) Eva Martincová (Czech Republic) Alena Vašková	6–4, 6–1
Winner	56.	23 April 2000	ITF Fresno, US	Hard	(Australia) Rachel McQuillan	(Australia) Evie Dominikovic (Australia) Amanda Grahame	6–4, 6–4
Runner-up	57.	7 May 2000	ITF Virginia Beach, US	Hard	(South Africa) Jessica Steck	(United States) Dawn Buth (United States) Mashona Washington	6–1, 3–6, 6–7^{(2)}
Winner	58.	16 July 2000	ITF Peachtree, US	Hard	(United States) Dawn Buth	(United States) Allison Bradshaw (United States) Abigail Spears	2–6, 6–4, 6–4
Runner-up	59.	17 July 2000	ITF Mahwah, US	Hard	(Kazakhstan) Irina Selyutina	(Australia) Evie Dominikovic (India) Nirupama Sanjeev	4–6, 4–6
Winner	60.	30 July 2000	ITF Salt Lake City, US	Hard	(Kazakhstan) Irina Selyutina	(United States) Samantha Reeves (South Africa) Jessica Steck	w/o
Winner	61.	24 September 2000	ITF Kirkland, US	Hard	(United States) Katie Schlukebir	(United States) Allison Bradshaw (United States) Abigail Spears	3–6, 6–2, 6–3
Runner-up	62.	2 October 2000	ITF Albuquerque, US	Hard	(India) Nirupama Sanjeev	(United States) Brie Rippner (Ukraine) Elena Tatarkova	4–6, 4–6
Winner	63.	15 October 2000	ITF Miramar, US	Clay	(South Africa) Liezel Huber	(Paraguay) Rossana de los Ríos (United States) Samantha Reeves	5–3, 4–1, 4–1
Runner-up	64.	26 November 2000	ITF Nuriootpa, Australia	Hard	(Australia) Rachel McQuillan	(South Africa) Nannie de Villiers (Australia) Annabel Ellwood	6–7^{(1)}, 3–6
Winner	65.	8 April 2001	ITF West Palm Beach, US	Clay	(Australia) Rachel McQuillan	(Japan) Rika Hiraki (Japan) Nana Miyagi	6–3, 6–3
Winner	66.	15 April 2001	ITF Columbus, US	Hard (i)	(Kazakhstan) Irina Selyutina	(United States) Amanda Augustus (United States) Sarah Taylor	6–1, 7–5
Winner	67.	22 April 2001	ITF Allentown, US	Hard (i)	(Kazakhstan) Irina Selyutina	(United States) Amanda Augustus (Czech Republic) Zuzana Lešenarová	7–5, 6–3
Winner	68.	15 July 2001	ITF College Park, US	Hard	(Japan) Nana Miyagi	(United States) Dawn Buth (Canada) Vanessa Webb	6–1, 6–4
Winner	69.	22 July 2001	ITF Mahwah, US	Hard	(Japan) Nana Miyagi	(United States) Dawn Buth (Canada) Vanessa Webb	6–1, 3–6, 6–2
Winner	70.	5 August 2001	ITF Lexington, US	Hard	(Japan) Nana Miyagi	(United States) Julie Ditty (Venezuela) Milagros Sequera	6–0, 6–4
Runner-up	71.	30 September 2001	ITF Albuquerque, US	Hard	(Japan) Nana Miyagi	(United States) Marissa Irvin (United States) Katie Schlukebir	4–6, 6–1, 4–6
Winner	72.	15 October 2001	ITF Cairns, Australia	Hard	(Australia) Trudi Musgrave	(Netherlands) Mariëlle Hoogland (Slovakia) Zuzana Váleková	6–4, 6–3
Winner	73.	28 October 2001	ITF Home Hill, Australia	Hard	(Australia) Trudi Musgrave	(Australia) Beti Sekulovski (Australia) Nicole Sewell	7–5, 6–4
Winner	74.	29 October 2001	ITF Mackay, Australia	Hard	(Australia) Trudi Musgrave	(Netherlands) Mariëlle Hoogland (Slovakia) Zuzana Váleková	6–2, 6–3
Winner	75.	18 November 2001	ITF Port Pirie, Australia	Hard	(Australia) Trudi Musgrave	(South Korea) Jeon Mi-ra (South Korea) Kim Eun-ha	7–5, 6–4
Winner	76.	6 April 2002	ITF Jackson, US	Clay	(Australia) Christina Wheeler	(Argentina) Gisela Dulko (Venezuela) Milagros Sequera	6–2, 6–4
Runner-up	77.	28 July 2002	Lexington Challenger, US	Hard	(Australia) Rachel McQuillan	(Japan) Nana Miyagi (Kazakhstan) Irina Selyutina	7–6^{(2)}, 2–6, 5–7
Winner	78.	22 September 2002	ITF Columbus, US	Hard	(Kazakhstan) Irina Selyutina	(United States) Teryn Ashley (United States) Ashley Harkleroad	w/o
Runner-up	79.	15 April 2003	ITF Jackson, US	Clay	(Australia) Christina Wheeler	(United States) Teryn Ashley (United States) Abigail Spears	1–6, 3–6
Runner-up	80.	5 May 2003	ITF Sea Island, US	Clay	(Australia) Christina Wheeler	(United States) Jennifer Russell (United States) Jessica Lehnhoff	3–6, 4–6
Winner	81.	13 July 2003	ITF College Park, US	Hard	(United States) Jennifer Russell	(Puerto Rico) Kristina Brandi (South Africa) Kim Grant	6–2, 4–6, 7–5
Winner	82.	3 August 2003	ITF Louisville, US	Hard	(United States) Julie Ditty	(United States) Teryn Ashley (United States) Shenay Perry	7–6^{(4)}, 6–7^{(5)}, 6–3
Winner	83.	23 November 2003	ITF Nuriootpa, Australia	Hard	(Australia) Trudi Musgrave	(Australia) Bryanne Stewart (Australia) Samantha Stosur	4–6, 6–3, 7–5
Winner	84.	25 April 2004	Dothan Pro Classic, US	Clay	(Venezuela) Milagros Sequera	(China) Peng Shuai (China) Xie Yanze	6–7^{(6)}, 6–4, 6–2

== Fed Cup performance ==
Result	Date	Edition	Opponent team	Surface	Partner	Opponents	Score
Win	11 July 2004	2004 World Group Playoffs	Thailand	Hard (i)	(Australia) Christina Wheeler	(Thailand) Montinee Tangphong (Thailand) Napaporn Tongsalee	4–6, 6–3, 7–5
