= 1990 Virginia Slims of Albuquerque – Singles =

Singles
- 1990 Virginia Slims of Albuquerque

Final
- Champion: (Czechoslovakia) Jana Novotná
- Runner-up: (Peru) Laura Gildemeister
- Score: 6–4, 6–4

Details
- Draw: 32 (4Q/1LL)
- Seeds: 8

Events
Singles	Doubles
← 1989 ·	Virginia Slims of Albuquerque	· 1991 →

Lori McNeil was the defending champion, but she chose to compete at San Diego during the same week, losing in the first round to Ann Grossman.

Jana Novotná won the title by defeating Laura Gildemeister 6–4, 6–4 in the final.

== Seeds ==
1. (Czechoslovakia) Jana Novotná (champion)
2. (Peru) Laura Gildemeister (final)
3. (United States) Anne Smith (semifinals)
4. (South Africa) Dianne Van Rensburg (quarterfinals)
5. (Netherlands) Brenda Schultz (first round)
6. (United States) Susan Sloane (semifinals)
7. (South Africa) Amanda Coetzer (quarterfinals)
8. (Australia) Anne Minter (quarterfinals)

== Draw ==
=== Key ===
- Q = Qualifier
- WC = Wild card
- LL = Lucky loser
- Alt = Alternate
- ITF = ITF entry
- PR = Protected ranking
- SR = Special ranking
- SE = Special exempt
- JE = Junior exempt
- JR = Junior Accelerator Programme entrant
- CO = College Accelerator Programme entrant
- NG = Next Gen Accelerator Program entrant
- w/o = Walkover
- r = Retired
- d = Defaulted

=== Finals ===
Semifinals
1	(Czechoslovakia) Jana Novotná	6	6	7
3	(United States) Anne Smith	4	7	5
6	(United States) Susan Sloane	2	2
2	(Peru) Laura Gildemeister	6	6

Final
1	(Czechoslovakia) Jana Novotná	6	6
2	(Peru) Laura Gildemeister	4	4

=== Top half ===
First round
1	(Czechoslovakia) J Novotná	6	6
(United States) C Cunningham	0	1
LL	(New Zealand) C Toleafoa	4	7	7
(Sweden) M Strandlund	6	6	5
(United States) H Na	3	5
(France) K Quentrec	6	7
(United States) M McGrath	6	7
5	(Netherlands) B Schultz	4	6
3	(United States) A Smith	7	6
(United States) M Werdel	5	1
(United States) A Keller	4	2
Q	(France) C Suire	6	6
(United States) B Nagelsen	6	6
(France) P Paradis	3	4
(United States) C Benjamin	0	4
7	(South Africa) A Coetzer	6	6

Second round
1	(Czechoslovakia) J Novotná	6	6
LL	(New Zealand) C Toleafoa	2	3
(France) K Quentrec	6	7
(United States) M McGrath	2	6
3	(United States) A Smith	6	7
Q	(France) C Suire	4	5
(United States) B Nagelsen	3	6
7	(South Africa) A Coetzer	6	7

Quarterfinals
1	(Czechoslovakia) J Novotná	6	6	6
(France) K Quentrec	7	2	1
3	(United States) A Smith	6	6
7	(South Africa) A Coetzer	2	1

Semifinals
1	(Czechoslovakia) J Novotná	6	6	7
3	(United States) A Smith	4	7	5

=== Bottom half ===
First round
6	(United States) S Sloane	6	6
(United States) A Henricksson	0	1
Q	(United States) K Adams	3	0
(United States) H Cioffi	6	6
(United States) A Leand	0	7	4
(United States) W White-Prausa	6	6	6
(United States) P Louie-Harper	4	6	5
4	(South Africa) D Van Rensburg	6	3	7
8	(Australia) A Minter	6	4	6
Q	(South Africa) R Field	3	6	1
(United States) K May-Paben	6	6	6
(France) A Dechaume	4	7	4
(New Zealand) B Cordwell	4	4
(Argentina) B Fulco	6	6
Q	(United Kingdom) S Gomer	4	6
2	(Peru) L Gildemeister	6	7

Second round
6	(United States) S Sloane	7	6
(United States) H Cioffi	5	3
(United States) W White-Prausa	1	1
4	(South Africa) D Van Rensburg	6	6
8	(Australia) A Minter	6	6
(United States) K May-Paben	3	4
(Argentina) B Fulco	7	2	2
2	(Peru) L Gildemeister	6	6	6

Quarterfinals
6	(United States) S Sloane	7	6
4	(South Africa) D Van Rensburg	6	2
8	(Australia) A Minter	6	3	2
2	(Peru) L Gildemeister	0	6	6

Semifinals
6	(United States) S Sloane	2	2
2	(Peru) L Gildemeister	6	6
