= 1990 Virginia Slims of Albuquerque – Doubles =

Doubles
- 1990 Virginia Slims of Albuquerque

Final
- Champions: (United States) Meredith McGrath (United States) Anne Smith
- Runners-up: (United States) Peanut Louie Harper (United States) Wendy White
- Score: 7–6^{(7–2)}, 6–4

Details
- Draw: 16
- Seeds: 4

Events
Singles	Doubles
← 1989 ·	Virginia Slims of Albuquerque	· 1991 →

Nicole Provis and Elna Reinach were the defending champions, but none competed this year.

Meredith McGrath and Anne Smith won the title by defeating Peanut Louie Harper and Wendy White 7–6^{(7–2)}, 6–4 in the final.

== Seeds ==
1. (United States) Mary Joe Fernández / (United States) Betsy Nagelsen (semifinals)
2. (United States) Katrina Adams / (Czechoslovakia) Jana Novotná (semifinals)
3. (United States) Meredith McGrath / (United States) Anne Smith (champions)
4. (United States) Peanut Louie Harper / (United States) Wendy White (final)

== Draw ==
=== Key ===
- Q = Qualifier
- WC = Wild card
- LL = Lucky loser
- Alt = Alternate
- ITF = ITF entry
- PR = Protected ranking
- SR = Special ranking
- SE = Special exempt
- JE = Junior exempt
- JR = Junior Accelerator Programme entrant
- CO = College Accelerator Programme entrant
- NG = Next Gen Accelerator Program entrant
- w/o = Walkover
- r = Retired
- d = Defaulted

=== Draw ===
First round
1	(United States) MJ Fernández (United States) B Nagelsen	6	6
(United States) J Santrock (United States) S Sloane	0	3
(United States) H Na (South Africa) D Van Rensburg	6	4	4
(New Zealand) B Cordwell (New Zealand) J Richardson	4	6	6
4	(United States) P Louie Harper (United States) W White	6	4	6
(South Africa) L Barnard (United States) C Benjamin	3	6	3
(United States) J Fuchs (Sweden) M Strandlund	6	3	4
(France) M Pierce (Netherlands) B Schultz	4	6	6
(United States) A Keller (United States) S McCarthy	6	1	3
(France) P Paradis (France) C Suire	3	6	6
(Australia) A Minter (United States) M Werdel	1	2
3	(United States) M McGrath (United States) A Smith	6	6
(Peru) L Gildemeister (United States) J Smoller	4	7	6
(France) A Dechaume (Hungary) R Szikszay	6	6	3
(Argentina) B Fulco (New Zealand) C Toleafoa	1	4
2	(United States) K Adams (Czechoslovakia) J Novotná	6	6

Quarterfinals
1	(United States) MJ Fernández (United States) B Nagelsen	6	6
(New Zealand) B Cordwell (New Zealand) J Richardson	1	1
4	(United States) P Louie Harper (United States) W White	7	7
(France) M Pierce (Netherlands) B Schultz	5	5
(France) P Paradis (France) C Suire	1	4
3	(United States) M McGrath (United States) A Smith	6	6
(Peru) L Gildemeister (United States) J Smoller	6	3	4
2	(United States) K Adams (Czechoslovakia) J Novotná	3	6	6

Semifinals
1	(United States) MJ Fernández (United States) B Nagelsen	6	6	5
4	(United States) P Louie Harper (United States) W White	3	7	7
3	(United States) M McGrath (United States) A Smith	6	6
2	(United States) K Adams (Czechoslovakia) J Novotná	1	3

Final
4	(United States) P Louie Harper (United States) W White	6^{2}	4
3	(United States) M McGrath (United States) A Smith	7^{7}	6
