= 1989 Virginia Slims of Albuquerque – Singles =

Singles
- 1989 Virginia Slims of Albuquerque

Final
- Champion: (United States) Lori McNeil
- Runner-up: (South Africa) Elna Reinach
- Score: 6–1, 6–3

Details
- Draw: 32
- Seeds: 8

Events
Singles	Doubles
Virginia Slims of Albuquerque	· 1990 →

Lori McNeil won in the final 6–1, 6–3 against Elna Reinach.

== Seeds ==
A champion seed is indicated in bold text while text in italics indicates the round in which that seed was eliminated.

1. (Spain) Arantxa Sánchez Vicario (second round)
2. (Bulgaria) Manuela Maleeva (quarterfinals)
3. (United States) Susan Sloane (first round)
4. (Italy) Raffaella Reggi (second round)
5. (United States) **Lori McNeil (champion)**
6. (United States) Amy Frazier (semifinals)
7. (Australia) Anne Minter (quarterfinals)
8. (Australia) Jenny Byrne (first round)

== Draw ==
=== Key ===
- Q = Qualifier
- WC = Wild card
- LL = Lucky loser
- Alt = Alternate
- SE = Special exempt
- PR = Protected ranking
- ITF = ITF entry
- JE = Junior exempt
- w/o = Walkover
- r = Retired
- d = Defaulted
- SR = Special ranking

First round
1	(Spain) **A Sánchez Vicario**	**6**	**6**
(Peru) P Vásquez	2	2
(Japan) M Kidowaki	3	1
(United States) **B Nagelsen**	**6**	**6**
(United States) **A Smith**	**6**	**6**
(Australia) N Provis	1	2
(Japan) **N Miyagi**	**6**	**6**
8	(Australia) J Byrne	1	2
3	(United States) S Sloane	2	1
(South Africa) **A Coetzer**	**6**	**6**
(United States) T Whitlinger	3	**6**	5
(United States) **B Bowes**	**6**	0	**7**
(United States) L Harvey-Wild	1	5
(West Germany) **C Porwik**	**6**	**7**
(Australia) J-A Faull	2	3
5	(United States) **L McNeil**	**6**	**6**
7	(Australia) **A Minter**	**6**	**6**
(United States) M Louie-Harper	4	3
(United States) **E Burgin**	**6**	**6**
(United States) K Adams	4	1
(South Africa) **E Reinach**	**6**	**6**
(United States) M Werdel	2	3
(United States) K Jordan	6	**7**	3
4	(Italy) **R Reggi**	**7**	5	**6**
6	(United States) **A Frazier**	**7**	**6**
(United States) C Benjamin	5	1
(Czechoslovakia) **J Pospíšilová**	**6**	**6**
(United States) K Keil	1	1
(United States) **A Henricksson**	**7**	**6**
(Australia) J Tremelling	6	3
(Australia) R McQuillan	5	6
2	(Bulgaria) **M Maleeva**	**7**	**7**

Second round
1	(Spain) A Sánchez Vicario	**6**	4	4
(United States) **B Nagelsen**	1	**6**	**6**
(United States) **A Smith**	**6**	**7**
(Japan) N Miyagi	1	5
(South Africa) A Coetzer	**7**	4	2
(United States) **B Bowes**	5	**6**	**6**
(West Germany) C Porwik	3	5
5	(United States) **L McNeil**	**6**	**7**
7	(Australia) **A Minter**	**6**	**6**
(United States) E Burgin	3	2
(South Africa) **E Reinach**	**7**	**7**
4	(Italy) R Reggi	5	6
6	(United States) **A Frazier**	**6**	**6**
(Czechoslovakia) J Pospíšilová	3	3
(United States) A Henricksson	1	3
2	(Bulgaria) **M Maleeva**	**6**	**6**

Quarterfinals
(United States) **B Nagelsen**	**7**	3	**6**
(United States) A Smith	6	**6**	4
(United States) B Bowes	1	1
5	(United States) **L McNeil**	**6**	**6**
7	(Australia) A Minter	**6**	3	2
(South Africa) **E Reinach**	3	**6**	**6**
6	(United States) **A Frazier**	**6**	**6**
2	(Bulgaria) M Maleeva	3	4

Semifinals
(United States) B Nagelsen	3	6
5	(United States) **L McNeil**	**6**	**7**
(South Africa) **E Reinach**	**6**	**6**
6	(United States) A Frazier	2	2

Final
5	(United States) **Lori McNeil**	**6**	**6**
(South Africa) Elna Reinach	1	3
