= 1989 Virginia Slims of Albuquerque – Doubles =

Doubles
- 1989 Virginia Slims of Albuquerque

Final
- Champions: (Australia) Nicole Provis (South Africa) Elna Reinach
- Runners-up: (Italy) Raffaella Reggi (Spain) Arantxa Sánchez Vicario
- Score: 4–6, 6–4, 6–2

Details
- Draw: 16
- Seeds: 4

Events
Singles	Doubles
Virginia Slims of Albuquerque	· 1990 →

Nicole Provis and Elna Reinach won in the final 4–6, 6–4, 6–2 against Raffaella Reggi and Arantxa Sánchez Vicario.

== Seeds ==
Champion seeds are indicated in bold text while text in italics indicates the round in which those seeds were eliminated.

1. (Australia) Elizabeth Smylie / (Australia) Wendy Turnbull (first round)
2. (United States) Katrina Adams / (United States) Elise Burgin (first round)
3. (Australia) Jenny Byrne / (Australia) Janine Tremelling (first round)
4. (Australia) **Nicole Provis** / (South Africa) **Elna Reinach (champions)**

== Draw ==
=== Key ===
- Q = Qualifier
- WC = Wild card
- LL = Lucky loser
- Alt = Alternate
- SE = Special exempt
- PR = Protected ranking
- ITF = ITF entry
- JE = Junior exempt
- w/o = Walkover
- r = Retired
- d = Defaulted
- SR = Special ranking

First round
1	(Australia) E Smylie (Australia) W Turnbull	3	**6**	5
(Italy) **R Reggi** (Spain) **A Sánchez Vicario**	**6**	1	**7**
(United States) K Po (United States) T Whitlinger	4	2
(Australia) **A Minter** (New Zealand) **J Richardson**	**6**	**6**
3	(Australia) J Byrne (Australia) J Tremelling	4	**7**	6
(Australia) **J-A Faull** (Australia) **R McQuillan**	**6**	6	**7**
(United States) **B Bowes** (United States) **M Werdel**	**7**	**6**
(United States) C Neeld-Lang (United States) L Palmisano	5	2
(United States) **A Smith** (France) **C Suire**	5	**7**	**6**
(United States) M Louie-Harper (Australia) A Scott	**7**	6	2
(United States) A Frazier (Czechoslovakia) J Pospíšilová	5	0
4	(Australia) **N Provis** (South Africa) **E Reinach**	**7**	**6**
(United States) P Barg (United States) A Henricksson	**7**	3	2
(South Africa) **L Barnard** (United States) **C Benjamin**	5	**6**	**6**
(United States) **K Jordan** (United States) **B Nagelsen**	**6**	**6**
2	(United States) K Adams (United States) E Burgin	3	2

Quarterfinals
(Italy) **R Reggi** (Spain) **A Sánchez Vicario**	**6**	**6**
(Australia) A Minter (New Zealand) J Richardson	1	4
(Australia) **J-A Faull** (Australia) **R McQuillan**	**7**	**6**
(United States) B Bowes (United States) M Werdel	6	4
(United States) A Smith (France) C Suire	4	6
4	(Australia) **N Provis** (South Africa) **E Reinach**	**6**	**7**
(South Africa) L Barnard (United States) C Benjamin	2	3
(United States) **K Jordan** (United States) **B Nagelsen**	**6**	**6**

Semifinals
(Italy) **R Reggi** (Spain) **A Sánchez Vicario**	**6**	**6**
(Australia) J-A Faull (Australia) R McQuillan	2	4
4	(Australia) **N Provis** (South Africa) **E Reinach**	**6**	5	**6**
(United States) K Jordan (United States) B Nagelsen	4	**7**	4

Final
(Italy) Raffaella Reggi (Spain) Arantxa Sánchez Vicario	**6**	4	2
4	(Australia) **Nicole Provis** (South Africa) **Elna Reinach**	4	**6**	**6**
