= 1990 U.S. Women's Hardcourt Championships – Singles =

Singles
- 1990 U.S. Women's Hardcourt Championships

Final
- Champion: (Socialist Federal Republic of Yugoslavia) Monica Seles
- Runner-up: (Switzerland) Manuela Maleeva-Fragnière
- Score: 6–4, 6–3

Details
- Draw: 16 (2Q/1LL)
- Seeds: 4

Events
| Singles | Doubles |
| ← 1989 · | Connecticut Open | · 1991 → |

Two-time defending champion Steffi Graf did not compete this year.

Monica Seles won the title by defeating Manuela Maleeva-Fragnière 6–4, 6–3 in the final.

== Seeds ==
1. (Argentina) Gabriela Sabatini (first round)
2. (Socialist Federal Republic of Yugoslavia) Monica Seles (champion)
3. (Switzerland) Manuela Maleeva-Fragnière (final)
4. (Czechoslovakia) Jana Novotná (quarterfinals)

== Draw ==
=== Key ===
- Q = Qualifier
- WC = Wild card
- LL = Lucky loser
- Alt = Alternate
- ITF = ITF entry
- PR = Protected ranking
- SR = Special ranking
- SE = Special exempt
- JE = Junior exempt
- JR = Junior Accelerator Programme entrant
- CO = College Accelerator Programme entrant
- NG = Next Gen Accelerator Program entrant
- w/o = Walkover
- r = Retired
- d = Defaulted

=== Draw ===
First round
1 | (Argentina) G Sabatini | 3 | 4
(United States) L McNeil | 6 | 6
(Sweden) C Lindqvist | 1 | 0
(United States) G Fernández | 6 | 6
3 | (Switzerland) M Maleeva-Fragnière | 6 | 6
LL | (South Africa) E Reinach | 2 | 0
(United States) K Rinaldi | 6 | 1 | 4
Q | (United States) C Cunningham | 4 | 6 | 6
(South Africa) R Fairbank-Nideffer | 6 | 6
Q | (United States) R White | 1 | 2
(Australia) A Minter | 4 | 1
4 | (Czechoslovakia) J Novotná | 6 | 6
(Australia) H Mandlíková | 6 | 7
(Soviet Union) L Savchenko-Neiland | 4 | 5
(United States) A Smith | 3 | 5
2 | (Socialist Federal Republic of Yugoslavia) M Seles | 6 | 7

Quarterfinals
(United States) L McNeil | 6 | 6
(United States) G Fernández | 2 | 0
3 | (Switzerland) M Maleeva-Fragnière | 6 | 6
Q | (United States) C Cunningham | 1 | 1
(South Africa) R Fairbank-Nideffer | 6 | 2 | 7
4 | (Czechoslovakia) J Novotná | 1 | 6 | 5
(Australia) H Mandlíková | 4 | 4
2 | (Socialist Federal Republic of Yugoslavia) M Seles | 6 | 6

Semifinals
(United States) L McNeil | 0 | 4
3 | (Switzerland) M Maleeva-Fragnière | 6 | 6
(South Africa) R Fairbank-Nideffer | 3 | 0
2 | (Socialist Federal Republic of Yugoslavia) M Seles | 6 | 6

Final
3 | (Switzerland) M Maleeva-Fragnière | 4 | 3
2 | (Socialist Federal Republic of Yugoslavia) M Seles | 6 | 6
