= 1989 Virginia Slims of Albuquerque =

- Date: August 14–20
- Edition: 1st
- Category: Category 2
- Draw: 32S / 16D
- Prize money: $100,000
- Surface: Hard / outdoor
- Location: Albuquerque, New Mexico, U.S.

Champions

Singles
- (United States) Lori McNeil

Doubles
- (Australia) Nicole Provis / (South Africa) Elna Reinach
| Virginia Slims of Albuquerque | · 1990 → |

The 1989 Virginia Slims of Albuquerque was a women's tennis tournament played on outdoor hard courts in Albuquerque, New Mexico in the United States that was part of the Category 2 tier of the 1989 WTA Tour. It was the inaugural edition of the tournament and was held from August 14 through August 20, 1989. Fifth-seeded Lori McNeil won the singles title.

== Finals ==
=== Singles ===
(United States) Lori McNeil defeated (South Africa) Elna Reinach 6–1, 6–3

- It was McNeil's 4th title of the year and the 22nd of her career.

=== Doubles ===
(Australia) Nicole Provis / (South Africa) Elna Reinach defeated (Italy) Raffaella Reggi / (Spain) Arantxa Sánchez Vicario 4–6, 6–4, 6–2

- It was Provis' only title of the year and the 2nd of her career. It was Reinach's only title of the year and the 1st of her career.
