= 1991 Virginia Slims of Albuquerque – Singles =

Singles
- 1991 Virginia Slims of Albuquerque

Final
- Champion: (United States) Gigi Fernández
- Runner-up: (France) Julie Halard
- Score: 6–0, 6–2

Details
- Draw: 32 (4Q/1LL)
- Seeds: 8

Events
Singles	Doubles
- Virginia Slims of Albuquerque

Jana Novotná was the defending champion, but did not compete this year.

Gigi Fernández won the title by defeating Julie Halard 6–0, 6–2 in the final.

== Seeds ==
1. (France) Julie Halard (final)
2. (United States) Gigi Fernández (champion)
3. (France) Mary Pierce (quarterfinals)
4. (United States) Susan Sloane (semifinals)
5. (United States) Patty Fendick (first round)
6. (South Africa) Elna Reinach (semifinals)
7. (Italy) Linda Ferrando (quarterfinals)
8. (United States) Peanut Louie Harper (first round)

== Draw ==
Key

- Q = Qualifier
- WC = Wild card
- LL = Lucky loser
- Alt = Alternate
- ITF = ITF entry
- PR = Protected ranking
- SR = Special ranking
- SE = Special exempt
- JE = Junior exempt
- JR = Junior Accelerator Programme entrant
- CO = College Accelerator Programme entrant
- NG = Next Gen Accelerator Program entrant
- w/o = Walkover
- r = Retired
- d = Defaulted

=== Finals ===
Semifinals
1	(France) Julie Halard	6	3	6
6	(South Africa) Elna Reinach	3	6	4
4	(United States) Susan Sloane	3	7	2
2	(United States) Gigi Fernández	6	5	6

Final
1	(France) Julie Halard	0	2
2	(United States) Gigi Fernández	6	6

=== Top half ===
First round
1	(France) J Halard	6	6
(United States) M Jackson-Nobrega	3	3
(France) N van Lottum	4	7	6
(United Kingdom) M Javer	6	5	1
Q	(United States) A Gooden	6	3	2
Q	(United States) K Adams	4	6	6
(France) K Quentrec	6	6
5	(United States) P Fendick	2	3
3	(France) M Pierce	6	6
(France) N Herreman	2	2
(France) P Paradis-Mangon	4	3
(Soviet Union) T Ignatieva	6	6
(United States) C Kuhlman	3	4
(France) A Dechaume	6	6
(France) E Demongeot	4	6	4
6	(South Africa) E Reinach	6	3	6

Second round
1	(France) J Halard	6	6
(France) N van Lottum	1	1
Q	(United States) K Adams	7^{7}	4	7^{7}
(France) K Quentrec	6^{3}	6	6^{5}
3	(France) M Pierce	6	6
(Soviet Union) T Ignatieva	1	4
(France) A Dechaume	1	6	0
6	(South Africa) E Reinach	6	2	6

Quarterfinals
1	(France) J Halard	6	4	6
Q	(United States) K Adams	2	6	0
3	(France) M Pierce	2	0
6	(South Africa) E Reinach	6	6

Semifinals
1	(France) J Halard	6	3	6
6	(South Africa) E Reinach	3	6	4

=== Bottom half ===
First round
8	(United States) P Louie Harper	4	6^{5}
Q	(United States) N Arendt	6	7^{7}
(Australia) JA Faull	2	6^{6}
(France) S Testud	6	7^{8}
(Japan) T Takagi	4	6	6
LL	(Australia) T Morton	6	4	2
(South Africa) A Coetzer	4	4
4	(United States) S Sloane	6	6
7	(Italy) L Ferrando	2	6	6
(Germany) M Kochta	6	1	3
(United States) B Bowes	6	7
(France) N Guerrée	3	5
(United States) H Cioffi	6	6
(Australia) Stephanie Martin	3	3
Q	(United States) P O'Reilly	7	1	4
2	(United States) G Fernández	5	6	6

Second round
Q	(United States) N Arendt	4	6	2
(France) S Testud	6	4	6
(Japan) T Takagi	5	4
4	(United States) S Sloane	7	6
7	(Italy) L Ferrando	6	6
(United States) B Bowes	0	2
(United States) H Cioffi	4	5
2	(United States) G Fernández	6	7

Quarterfinals
(France) S Testud	3	3
4	(United States) S Sloane	6	6
7	(Italy) L Ferrando	4	6^{6}
2	(United States) G Fernández	6	7^{8}

Semifinals
4	(United States) S Sloane	3	7	2
2	(United States) G Fernández	6	5	6
