= 1990 U.S. Women's Hardcourt Championships – Doubles =

Doubles
- 1990 U.S. Women's Hardcourt Championships

Final
- Champions: (United States) Kathy Jordan (Australia) Elizabeth Smylie
- Runners-up: (United States) Gigi Fernández (United States) Robin White
- Score: 7–5, 7–5

Details
- Draw: 8
- Seeds: 2

Events
Singles	Doubles
← 1989 ·	Connecticut Open	· 1991 →

Katrina Adams and Pam Shriver were the defending champions, but none competed this year.

Kathy Jordan and Elizabeth Smylie won the title by defeating Gigi Fernández and Robin White 7–5, 7–5 in the final.

== Seeds ==
1. (United States) Gigi Fernández / (United States) Robin White (final)
2. (United States) Betsy Nagelsen / (Soviet Union) Larisa Savchenko-Neiland (quarterfinals, withdrew)

== Draw ==
=== Key ===
- Q = Qualifier
- WC = Wild card
- LL = Lucky loser
- Alt = Alternate
- ITF = ITF entry
- PR = Protected ranking
- SR = Special ranking
- SE = Special exempt
- JE = Junior exempt
- JR = Junior Accelerator Programme entrant
- CO = College Accelerator Programme entrant
- NG = Next Gen Accelerator Program entrant
- w/o = Walkover
- r = Retired
- d = Defaulted

=== Draw ===
Quarterfinals
1	(United States) Gigi Fernández (United States) Robin White	6	7
(Sweden) Maria Lindström (United States) Heather Ludloff	2	5
(Sweden) Catarina Lindqvist (Socialist Federal Republic of Yugoslavia) Monica Seles	1	4
(South Africa) Rosalyn Fairbank-Nideffer (United States) Anne Smith	6	6
(Australia) Anne Minter (South Africa) Elna Reinach	4	0
(United States) Kathy Jordan (Australia) Elizabeth Smylie	6	6
(Soviet Union) Natalia Medvedeva (United States) Kathy Rinaldi	w/o
2	(United States) Betsy Nagelsen (Soviet Union) Larisa Savchenko-Neiland

Semifinals
1	(United States) Gigi Fernández (United States) Robin White	6	6	7
(South Africa) Rosalyn Fairbank-Nideffer (United States) Anne Smith	7	2	5
(United States) Kathy Jordan (Australia) Elizabeth Smylie	3	6	6
(Soviet Union) Natalia Medvedeva (United States) Kathy Rinaldi	6	3	2

Final
1	(United States) Gigi Fernández (United States) Robin White	5	5
(United States) Kathy Jordan (Australia) Elizabeth Smylie	7	7
