= 1991 U.S. Women's Hardcourt Championships – Singles =

Singles
- 1991 U.S. Women's Hardcourt Championships

Final
- Champion: (Germany) Steffi Graf
- Runner-up: (Socialist Federal Republic of Yugoslavia) Monica Seles
- Score: 6–4, 6–3

Details
- Draw: 32 (2WC/4Q)
- Seeds: 8

Events
Singles	Doubles
← 1990 ·	Connecticut Open	· 1992 →

Monica Seles was the defending champion, but lost in the final to Steffi Graf. The score was 6–4, 6–3.

== Seeds ==
1. (Socialist Federal Republic of Yugoslavia) Monica Seles (final)
2. (Germany) Steffi Graf (champion)
3. (Switzerland) Manuela Maleeva-Fragnière (semifinals)
4. (Italy) Raffaella Reggi (first round)
5. (Peru) Laura Gildemeister (first round)
6. (United States) Lori McNeil (quarterfinals)
7. (United States) Susan Sloane (quarterfinals)
8. (United States) Gretchen Magers (first round)

== Draw ==
=== Key ===
- Q = Qualifier
- WC = Wild card
- LL = Lucky loser
- Alt = Alternate
- ITF = ITF entry
- PR = Protected ranking
- SR = Special ranking
- SE = Special exempt
- JE = Junior exempt
- JR = Junior Accelerator Programme entrant
- CO = College Accelerator Programme entrant
- NG = Next Gen Accelerator Program entrant
- w/o = Walkover
- r = Retired
- d = Defaulted

=== Finals ===
Semifinals
1	(Socialist Federal Republic of Yugoslavia) Monica Seles	6	2	6
3	(Switzerland) Manuela Maleeva-Fragnière	2	6	2
(France) Julie Halard	0	1
2/WC	(Germany) Steffi Graf	6	6

Final
1	(Socialist Federal Republic of Yugoslavia) Monica Seles	4	3
2/WC	(Germany) Steffi Graf	6	6

=== Top half ===
First round
1	(Socialist Federal Republic of Yugoslavia) M Seles	6	6
(Argentina) F Labat	0	1
Q	(United States) J Emmons	4	4
(Germany) C Porwik	6	6
WC	(United States) E deLone	6	6
(United States) S Martin	3	0
(Czechoslovakia) R Zrubáková	6	2	7^{8}
8	(United States) G Magers	4	6	6^{6}
3	(Switzerland) M Maleeva-Frangière	6	6
Q	(United States) A May	1	2
(Poland) R Baranski	6^{2}	2
(France) I Demongeot	7^{7}	6
(United States) K Rinaldi	0	0^{r}
(United States) P Fendick	6	1
(United States) C Benjamin	3	1
6	(United States) L McNeil	6	6

Second round
1	(Socialist Federal Republic of Yugoslavia) M Seles	6	6
(Germany) C Porwik	1	4
WC	(United States) E deLone	6	6
(Czechoslovakia) R Zrubáková	4	4
3	(Switzerland) M Maleeva-Frangière	6	6
(France) I Demongeot	2	2
(United States) P Fendick	4	3
6	(United States) L McNeil	6	6

Quarterfinals
1	(Socialist Federal Republic of Yugoslavia) M Seles	6	6
WC	(United States) E deLone	2	0
3	(Switzerland) M Maleeva-Frangière	6	6
6	(United States) L McNeil	3	4

Semifinals
1	(Socialist Federal Republic of Yugoslavia) M Seles	6	2	6
3	(Switzerland) M Maleeva-Frangière	2	6	2

=== Bottom half ===
First round
5	(Peru) L Gildemeister	4	2
(France) A Dechaume	6	6
Q	(Finland) P Thorén	1	6	1
(France) J Halard	6	2	6
(Czechoslovakia) E Švíglerová	6	7
(United States) C Cunningham	3	5
(United States) P Shriver	6	6
4	(Italy) R Reggi	3	3
7	(United States) S Sloane	6	6
(France) N Herreman	2	1
(United States) A Henricksson	6	6
(Italy) L Ferrando	3	4
(United Kingdom) M Javer	6	6
Q	(United States) C Kuhlman	3	1
(United States) A Keller	2	1
2/WC	(Germany) S Graf	6	6

Second round
(France) A Dechaume	1	3
(France) J Halard	6	6
(Czechoslovakia) E Švíglerová	2	7^{8}	6
(United States) P Shriver	6	6^{6}	3
7	(United States) S Sloane	6	6
(United States) A Henricksson	3	1
(United Kingdom) M Javer	3	1
2/WC	(Germany) S Graf	6	6

Quarterfinals
(France) J Halard	6	6
(Czechoslovakia) E Švíglerová	1	2
7	(United States) S Sloane	1	1
2/WC	(Germany) S Graf	6	6

Semifinals
(France) J Halard	0	1
2/WC	(Germany) S Graf	6	6
