= 1991 Virginia Slims of Albuquerque – Doubles =

Doubles
- 1991 Virginia Slims of Albuquerque

Final
- Champions: (United States) Katrina Adams (France) Isabelle Demongeot
- Runners-up: (South Africa) Lise Gregory (United States) Peanut Louie Harper
- Score: 6–7^{(2–7)}, 6–4, 6–3

Details
- Draw: 16 (1Q)
- Seeds: 4

Events
Singles	Doubles
- Virginia Slims of Albuquerque

Meredith McGrath and Anne Smith were the defending champions, but none competed this year.

Katrina Adams and Isabelle Demongeot won the title by defeating Lise Gregory and Peanut Louie Harper 6–7^{(2–7)}, 6–4, 6–3 in the final.

== Seeds ==
1. (United States) Patty Fendick / (South Africa) Elna Reinach (semifinals)
2. (United States) Katrina Adams / (France) Isabelle Demongeot (champions)
3. (South Africa) Lise Gregory / (United States) Peanut Louie Harper (final)
4. (Australia) Jo-Anne Faull / (France) Mary Pierce (quarterfinals)

== Draw ==
Key

- Q = Qualifier
- WC = Wild card
- LL = Lucky loser
- Alt = Alternate
- ITF = ITF entry
- PR = Protected ranking
- SR = Special ranking
- SE = Special exempt
- JE = Junior exempt
- JR = Junior Accelerator Programme entrant
- CO = College Accelerator Programme entrant
- NG = Next Gen Accelerator Program entrant
- w/o = Walkover
- r = Retired
- d = Defaulted

=== Draw ===
First round
1	(United States) P Fendick (South Africa) E Reinach	6	6
(United States) H Cioffi (Italy) L Ferrando	4	1
(United States) P O'Reilly (United States) Terri O'Reilly	6	7^{7}
(United States) B Bowes (Australia) T Morton	2	6^{3}
3	(South Africa) L Gregory (United States) P Louie Harper	6	3	6
(Australia) J Taylor (France) N van Lottum	1	6	1
(United States) N Arendt (United States) S McCarthy	6	6
(South Africa) A Coetzer (United States) M Jackson-Nobrega	0	1
(France) A Dechaume (France) J Halard	6	6
(United States) L Bartlett (United States) Lynn Nabors	3	4
Q	(Soviet Union) T Ignatieva (United States) S Sloane	2	0
4	(Australia) JA Faull (France) M Pierce	6	6
(United States) J Fuchs (United States) Betsy Somerville	3	5
(United States) A Gooden (United States) C Kuhlman	6	7
(France) N Herreman (France) P Paradis	6^{5}	2
2	(United States) K Adams (France) I Demongeot	7^{7}	6

Quarterfinals
1	(United States) P Fendick (South Africa) E Reinach	6	6
(United States) P O'Reilly (United States) Terri O'Reilly	1	2
3	(South Africa) L Gregory (United States) P Louie Harper	6	6
(United States) N Arendt (United States) S McCarthy	2	4
(France) A Dechaume (France) J Halard	6	6
4	(Australia) JA Faull (France) M Pierce	2	2
(United States) A Gooden (United States) C Kuhlman	5	2
2	(United States) K Adams (France) I Demongeot	7	6

Semifinals
1	(United States) P Fendick (South Africa) E Reinach	4	6	4
3	(South Africa) L Gregory (United States) P Louie Harper	6	2	6
(France) A Dechaume (France) J Halard	2	7^{7}	5
2	(United States) K Adams (France) I Demongeot	6	6^{4}	7

Final
3	(South Africa) L Gregory (United States) P Louie Harper	7^{7}	4	3
2	(United States) K Adams (France) I Demongeot	6^{2}	6	6
