= 1988 U.S. Women's Hard Court Championships – Doubles =

Doubles
- 1988 U.S. Women's Hard Court Championships

Final
- Champions: (United States) Lori McNeil (Czechoslovakia) Helena Suková
- Runners-up: (South Africa) Rosalyn Fairbank (United States) Gretchen Magers
- Score: 6–3, 6–7, 6–2

Details
- Draw: 16
- Seeds: 4

Events
Singles	Doubles
U.S. Women's Hard Court Championships	· 1989 →

Lori McNeil and Helena Suková won in the final 6–3, 6–7, 6–2 against Rosalyn Fairbank and Gretchen Magers.

== Seeds ==
Champion seeds are indicated in bold text while text in italics indicates the round in which those seeds were eliminated.

1. (United States) **Lori McNeil** / (Czechoslovakia) **Helena Suková (champions)**
2. (South Africa) Rosalyn Fairbank / (United States) Gretchen Magers (final)
3. (United States) Mary-Lou Daniels / (United States) Candy Reynolds (quarterfinals)
4. (United Kingdom) Jo Durie / (United States) Sharon Walsh-Pete (quarterfinals)

== Draw ==
=== Key ===
- Q = Qualifier
- WC = Wild card
- LL = Lucky loser
- Alt = Alternate
- SE = Special exempt
- PR = Protected ranking
- ITF = ITF entry
- JE = Junior exempt
- w/o = Walkover
- r = Retired
- d = Defaulted
- SR = Special ranking

First round
1	(United States) **L McNeil** (Czechoslovakia) **H Suková**	**6**	**6**
(United States) E Hakami (United States) M Werdel	2	3
(Japan) E Inoue (Argentina) A Villagrán	4	3
(Bulgaria) **K Maleeva** (Soviet Union) **L Meskhi**	**6**	**6**
4	(United Kingdom) **J Durie** (United States) **S Walsh-Pete**	**6**	**6**
(United States) C Christian (United States) A Grossman	1	2
(United States) L Allen (United States) C Benjamin	3	3
(Soviet Union) **L Savchenko** (Soviet Union) **N Zvereva**	**6**	**6**
(United Kingdom) S Gomer (United States) M Torres	1	2
(France) **I Demongeot** (France) **N Tauziat**	**6**	**6**
(United States) B Bowes (United States) C MacGregor	5	6
3	(United States) **M L Daniels** (United States) **C Reynolds**	**7**	**7**
(United States) **P Fendick** (Canada) **J Hetherington**	**6**	**6**
(United States) K Keil (Japan) A Kijimuta	4	4
(West Germany) S Meier (Australia) N Provis	3	4
2	(South Africa) **R Fairbank** (United States) **G Magers**	**6**	**6**

Quarterfinals
1	(United States) **L McNeil** (Czechoslovakia) **H Suková**	**6**	**6**
(Bulgaria) K Maleeva (Soviet Union) L Meskhi	2	2
4	(United Kingdom) J Durie (United States) S Walsh-Pete	0	**6**	4
(Soviet Union) **L Savchenko** (Soviet Union) **N Zvereva**	**6**	4	**6**
(France) **I Demongeot** (France) **N Tauziat**	**7**	**6**
3	(United States) M L Daniels (United States) C Reynolds	6	3
(United States) P Fendick (Canada) J Hetherington	3	2
2	(South Africa) **R Fairbank** (United States) **G Magers**	**6**	**6**

Semifinals
1	(United States) **L McNeil** (Czechoslovakia) **H Suková**	4	**7**	**6**
(Soviet Union) L Savchenko (Soviet Union) N Zvereva	**6**	5	1
(France) I Demongeot (France) N Tauziat	4	4
2	(South Africa) **R Fairbank** (United States) **G Magers**	**6**	**6**

Final
1	(United States) **Lori McNeil** (Czechoslovakia) **Helena Suková**	**6**	6	**6**
2	(South Africa) Rosalyn Fairbank (United States) Gretchen Magers	3	**7**	2
