= 1995 DFS Classic =

- Date: 12–18 June
- Edition: 14th
- Category: Tier III
- Draw: 56S / 28D
- Prize money: $161,250
- Surface: Grass / outdoor
- Location: Birmingham, United Kingdom
- Venue: Edgbaston Priory Club

Champions

Singles
- (United States) Zina Garrison-Jackson

Doubles
- (Netherlands) Manon Bollegraf / (Australia) Rennae Stubbs
← 1994 ·	Birmingham Classic	· 1996 →

The 1995 DFS Classic was a women's tennis tournament played on grass courts at the Edgbaston Priory Club in Birmingham in the United Kingdom that was part of Tier III of the 1995 WTA Tour. The tournament was held from 12 June until 18 June 1995. Third-seeded Zina Garrison-Jackson won the singles title.

== Finals ==
=== Singles ===
(United States) Zina Garrison-Jackson defeated (United States) Lori McNeil 6–3, 6–3

- It was Garrison-Jackson's only title of the year and the 37th of her career.

=== Doubles ===
(Netherlands) Manon Bollegraf / (Australia) Rennae Stubbs defeated (Australia) Nicole Bradtke / (Australia) Kristine Radford 3–6, 6–4, 6–4

- It was Bollegraf's 3rd title of the year and the 19th of her career. It was Stubbs' only title of the year and the 9th of her career.
