= 1990 Virginia Slims of Albuquerque =

- Date: August 6–12
- Edition: 2nd
- Category: Tier IV
- Draw: 32S / 16D
- Prize money: $150,000
- Surface: Hard / outdoor
- Location: Albuquerque, New Mexico, United States

Champions

Singles
- (Czechoslovakia) Jana Novotná

Doubles
- (United States) Meredith McGrath / (United States) Anne Smith
← 1989 ·	Virginia Slims of Albuquerque	· 1991 →

The 1990 Virginia Slims of Albuquerque was a women's tennis tournament played on outdoor hard courts in Albuquerque, New Mexico, in the United States that was part of the Tier IV category of the 1990 WTA Tour. It was the second edition of the tournament and was held from August 6 through August 12, 1990. First-seeded Jana Novotná won the singles title.

== Finals ==
=== Singles ===
(Czechoslovakia) Jana Novotná defeated (Peru) Laura Gildemeister 6–4, 6–4

- It was Novotná's only singles title of the year and the 3rd of her career.

=== Doubles ===
(United States) Meredith McGrath / (United States) Anne Smith defeated (United States) Peanut Louie Harper / (United States) Wendy White 7–6^{(7–2)}, 6–4

- It was McGrath's 2nd doubles title of the year and the 4th of her career. It was Smith's 2nd doubles title of the year and the 30th of her career.
