= 1991 U.S. Women's Hardcourt Championships – Doubles =

Doubles
- 1991 U.S. Women's Hardcourt Championships

Final
- Champions: (United States) Patty Fendick (Socialist Federal Republic of Yugoslavia) Monica Seles
- Runners-up: (Canada) Jill Hetherington (United States) Kathy Rinaldi
- Score: 7–6^{(7–2)}, 6–2

Details
- Draw: 16 (1WC/1Q)
- Seeds: 4

Events
Singles	Doubles
← 1990 ·	Connecticut Open	· 1992 →

Kathy Jordan and Elizabeth Smylie were the defending champions, but the pair competed at the WTA Doubles Championships at Tarpon Springs during the same week, losing at the semifinals.

Patty Fendick and Monica Seles won the title by defeating Jill Hetherington and Kathy Rinaldi 7–6^{(7–2)}, 6–2 in the final.

== Seeds ==
1. (United States) Patty Fendick / (Socialist Federal Republic of Yugoslavia) Monica Seles (champions)
2. (Canada) Jill Hetherington / (United States) Kathy Rinaldi (final)
3. (Switzerland) Manuela Maleeva-Fragnière / (Italy) Raffaella Reggi (semifinals)
4. (United States) Lori McNeil / (United States) Pam Shriver (quarterfinals)

== Draw ==
=== Key ===
- Q = Qualifier
- WC = Wild card
- LL = Lucky loser
- Alt = Alternate
- ITF = ITF entry
- PR = Protected ranking
- SR = Special ranking
- SE = Special exempt
- JE = Junior exempt
- JR = Junior Accelerator Programme entrant
- CO = College Accelerator Programme entrant
- NG = Next Gen Accelerator Program entrant
- w/o = Walkover
- r = Retired
- d = Defaulted

=== Draw ===
First round
1	(United States) P Fendick (Socialist Federal Republic of Yugoslavia) M Seles	6	6
Q	(United States) C Cunningham (France) J Halard	2	2
(South Africa) L Barnard (United States) A Henricksson	6	6
(United States) L Spadea (Czechoslovakia) R Zrubáková	1	3
3	(Switzerland) M Maleeva-Fragnière (Italy) R Reggi	6	2	7
(Peru) L Gildemeister (Germany) C Porwik	4	6	5
(United States) L Allen (France) S Amiach	3	3
(France) I Demongeot (Italy) L Ferrando	6	6
(United States) C Benjamin (Argentina) F Labat	2	5
(United States) G Magers (United States) A May	6	7
(Australia) JA Faull (Sweden) M Lindström	2	2
4	(United States) L McNeil (United States) P Shriver	6	6
(France) N Herreman (Czechoslovakia) E Švíglerová	6	4	7
WC	(United States) E deLone (United States) A Keller	0	6	5
(United States) E Hakami (United States) K Steinmetz	2	1
2	(Canada) J Hetherington (United States) K Rinaldi	6	6

Quarterfinals
1	(United States) P Fendick (Socialist Federal Republic of Yugoslavia) M Seles	6	6
(South Africa) L Barnard (United States) A Henricksson	4	1
3	(Switzerland) M Maleeva-Fragnière (Italy) R Reggi	6	6
(France) I Demongeot (Italy) L Ferrando	2	4
(United States) G Magers (United States) A May	7	6
4	(United States) L McNeil (United States) P Shriver	5	4
(France) N Herreman (Czechoslovakia) E Švíglerová	1	1
2	(Canada) J Hetherington (United States) K Rinaldi	6	6

Semifinals
1	(United States) P Fendick (Socialist Federal Republic of Yugoslavia) M Seles	3	6	7
3	(Switzerland) M Maleeva-Fragnière (Italy) R Reggi	6	4	5
(United States) G Magers (United States) A May	3	4
2	(Canada) J Hetherington (United States) K Rinaldi	6	6

Final
1	(United States) P Fendick (Socialist Federal Republic of Yugoslavia) M Seles	7^{7}	6
2	(Canada) J Hetherington (United States) K Rinaldi	6^{2}	2
