= 1995 DFS Classic – Singles =

Singles
- 1995 DFS Classic
- 1994 Champion: (United States) Lori McNeil

Final
- Champion: (United States) Zina Garrison-Jackson
- Runner-up: (United States) Lori McNeil
- Score: 6–3, 6–3

Details
- Draw: 56 (8 Q / 3 WC )
- Seeds: 16

Events
Singles	Doubles
← 1994 ·	Birmingham Classic	· 1996 →

The 1995 DFS Classic was a women's tennis tournament played on grass courts at the Edgbaston Priory Club in Birmingham in England that was part of Tier III of the 1995 WTA Tour. The tournament was held from 12 June until 18 June 1995. In the singles match, Lori McNeil was the defending champion but lost in the final 6–3, 6–3 against Zina Garrison-Jackson.

== Seeds ==
A champion seed is indicated in bold text while text in italics indicates the round in which that seed was eliminated. The top eight seeds received a bye to the second round.

1. (United States) Lori McNeil (final)
2. (United States) Gigi Fernández (third round)
3. (United States) **Zina Garrison-Jackson (Champion)**
4. (Netherlands) Miriam Oremans (third round)
5. (France) Nathalie Tauziat (third round)
6. (Latvia) Larisa Neiland (third round)
7. (United States) Meredith McGrath (second round)
8. (Germany) Christina Singer (quarterfinals)
9. (Australia) Rachel McQuillan (first round)
10. (South Africa) Elna Reinach (semifinals)
11. (Belgium) Laurence Courtois (quarterfinals)
12. (Japan) Ai Sugiyama (first round)
13. (South Korea) Park Sung-hee (first round)
14. (United States) Pam Shriver (third round)
15. (United States) Nicole Arendt (quarterfinals)
16. (Australia) Kristine Radford (quarterfinals)

== Draw ==
=== Key ===
- Q = Qualifier
- WC = Wild card
- LL = Lucky loser
- Alt = Alternate
- SE = Special exempt
- PR = Protected ranking
- ITF = ITF entry
- JE = Junior exempt
- w/o = Walkover
- r = Retired
- d = Defaulted
- SR = Special ranking

=== Finals ===
Quarterfinals
1	**(United States) Lori McNeil**	**6**	**6**
11	(Belgium) Laurence Courtois	0	3
15	(United States) Nicole Arendt	1	**6**	3
10	**(South Africa) Elna Reinach**	**6**	4	**6**
8	(Germany) Christina Singer	2	3
3	**(United States) Zina Garrison-Jackson**	**6**	**6**
16	(Australia) Kristine Radford	2	4
**(Belgium) Els Callens**	**6**	**6**

Semifinals
1	**(United States) Lori McNeil**	**6**	**6**
10	(South Africa) Elna Reinach	4	4
3	**(United States) Zina Garrison-Jackson**	**6**	**6**
(Belgium) Els Callens	2	1

Final
1	(United States) Lori McNeil	3	3
3	**(United States) Zina Garrison-Jackson**	**6**	**6**

=== Top half ===
==== Section 1 ====
First round
(Slovenia) **T Križan**	**7**	**6**
(United States) L Lee	5	4
(South Africa) **R Nideffer**	**6**	**6**
(Germany) S Frankl	1	1
(Australia) **K Godridge**	**6**	**6**
13	(South Korea) S-H Park	2	4
11	(Belgium) **L Courtois**	**6**	**6**
WC	(United Kingdom) C Wood	2	4
(United States) **E deLone**	**6**	**6**
(United States) K Adams	2	1
(United States) J Watanabe	2	2
(United States) **M Tu**	**6**	**6**

Second round
1	(United States) **L McNeil**	**6**	**6**
(Slovenia) T Križan	4	2
(South Africa) R Nideffer	**6**	4	2
(Australia) **K Godridge**	2	**6**	**6**
11	(Belgium) **L Courtois**	**6**	4	**7**
(United States) E deLone	2	**6**	5
(United States) **M Tu**	**7**	**1**
7	(United States) M McGrath	5	0	r

Third round
1	(United States) **L McNeil**	**6**	**6**
(Australia) K Godridge	3	3
11	(Belgium) **L Courtois**	**6**	**7**
(United States) M Tu	2	6

Quarterfinals
1	(United States) **L McNeil**	**6**	**6**
11	(Belgium) L Courtois	0	3

==== Section 2 ====
First round
(Japan) **H Nagano**	4	**6**	**9**
Q	(Argentina) V Stele	**6**	2	7
(Georgia (country)) **N Louarsabishvili**	**7**	**6**
Q	(United Kingdom) K Cross	5	1
Q	(Netherlands) M Bollegraf	1	4
15	(United States) **N Arendt**	**6**	**6**
10	(South Africa) **E Reinach**	**6**	**6**
Q	(Australia) S Drake-Brockman	0	4
WC	(United Kingdom) J Moore	**7**	1	5
(France) **I Demongeot**	5	**6**	**7**
Q	(Japan) **R Hiraki**	**6**	**6**
(Germany) C Porwik	4	2

Second round
4	(Netherlands) **M Oremans**	**6**	**6**
(Japan) H Nagano	4	2
(Georgia (country)) N Louarsabishvili	6	1
15	(United States) **N Arendt**	**7**	**6**
10	(South Africa) **E Reinach**	**6**	**6**
(France) I Demongeot	3	2
Q	(Japan) R Hiraki	1	**6**	5
6	(Latvia) **L Neiland**	**6**	4	**7**

Third round
4	(Netherlands) M Oremans	1	6
15	(United States) **N Arendt**	**6**	**7**
10	(South Africa) **E Reinach**	**6**	**6**
6	(Latvia) L Neiland	1	2

Quarterfinals
15	(United States) N Arendt	1	**6**	3
10	(South Africa) **E Reinach**	**6**	4	**6**

=== Bottom half ===
==== Section 3 ====
First round
(Hong Kong) M Tang	1	**6**	7
(Australia) **R Stubbs**	**6**	3	**9**
(Netherlands) K de Weille	3	1
Q	(Netherlands) **P Kamstra**	**6**	**6**
(Russia) T Panova	3	0
14	(United States) **P Shriver**	**6**	**6**
9	(Australia) R McQuillan	2	4
(Italy) **L Golarsa**	**6**	**6**
(Australia) K-A Guse	6	4
(Argentina) **M Paz**	**7**	**6**
(Netherlands) Y Basting	4	0
Q	(Netherlands) **C Vis**	**6**	**6**

Second round
8	(Germany) **C Singer**	**7**	**6**
(Australia) R Stubbs	6	1
(Netherlands) P Kamstra	5	**6**	6
14	(United States) **P Shriver**	**7**	3	**8**
(Italy) **L Golarsa**	**6**	**6**
(Argentina) M Paz	4	3
(Netherlands) C Vis	6	1
3	(United States) **Z Garrison-Jackson**	**7**	**6**

Third round
8	(Germany) **C Singer**	**6**	**6**
14	(United States) P Shriver	3	4
(Italy) L Golarsa	4	3
3	(United States) **Z Garrison-Jackson**	**6**	**6**

Quarterfinals
8	(Germany) C Singer	2	3
3	(United States) **Z Garrison-Jackson**	**6**	**6**

==== Section 4 ====
First round
(Madagascar) D Randriantefy	4	0
(Federal Republic of Yugoslavia) **T Ječmenica**	**6**	**6**
(Belgium) **N Feber**	1	**7**	**7**
(Italy) R Grande	**6**	5	6
LL	(Chinese Taipei) J Lee	2	4
16	(Australia) **K Radford**	**6**	**6**
12	(Japan) A Sugiyama	3	4
(Belgium) **E Callens**	**6**	**6**
(United States) **L Poruri**	3	**6**	**6**
(Sweden) M Strandlund	**6**	4	3
WC	(United Kingdom) J Durie	4	**6**	7
Q	(Austria) **M Schnell**	**6**	4	**9**

Second round
5	(France) **N Tauziat**	**6**	**6**
(Federal Republic of Yugoslavia) T Ječmenica	1	2
(Belgium) N Feber	**6**	1	4
16	(Australia) **K Radford**	0	**6**	**6**
(Belgium) **E Callens**	**7**	**6**
(United States) L Poruri	5	1
(Austria) M Schnell	5	4
2	(United States) **G Fernández**	**7**	**6**

Third round
5	(France) N Tauziat	**6**	4	6
16	(Australia) **K Radford**	2	**6**	**8**
(Belgium) **E Callens**	**6**	**6**
2	(United States) G Fernández	1	2

Quarterfinals
16	(Australia) K Radford	2	4
(Belgium) **E Callens**	**6**	**6**
