= 1989 U.S. Women's Hard Court Championships – Singles =

Singles
- 1989 U.S. Women's Hard Court Championships
- 1988 Champion: (West Germany) Steffi Graf

Final
- Champion: (West Germany) Steffi Graf
- Runner-up: (United States) Ann Henricksson
- Score: 6–1, 6–4

Details
- Draw: 32
- Seeds: 8

Events
Singles	Doubles
← 1988 ·	U.S. Women's Hard Court Championships	· 1990 →

Steffi Graf was the defending champion and won in the final 6–1, 6–4 against Ann Henricksson.

== Seeds ==
A champion seed is indicated in bold text while text in italics indicates the round in which that seed was eliminated.

1. (West Germany) **Steffi Graf (champion)**
2. (Bulgaria) Manuela Maleeva (second round)
3. (Soviet Union) Natasha Zvereva (first round)
4. (West Germany) Claudia Kohde-Kilsch (first round)
5. (United States) Patty Fendick (quarterfinals)
6. (Australia) Hana Mandlíková (semifinals)
7. (United States) Gretchen Magers (first round)
8. (United States) Terry Phelps (quarterfinals)

== Draw ==
=== Key ===
- Q = Qualifier
- WC = Wild card
- LL = Lucky loser
- Alt = Alternate
- SE = Special exempt
- PR = Protected ranking
- ITF = ITF entry
- JE = Junior exempt
- w/o = Walkover
- r = Retired
- d = Defaulted
- SR = Special ranking

First round
1	(West Germany) **S Graf**	**6**	**6**
(United States) B Herr	0	1
(Canada) J Hetherington	5	**6**	2
(United States) **L-A Eldredge**	**7**	4	**6**
(United States) L Allen	3	3
(South Africa) **D van Rensburg**	**6**	**6**
(United States) M Torres	5	2
8	(United States) **T Phelps**	**7**	**6**
4	(West Germany) C Kohde-Kilsch	**6**	6	6
(United States) **P Louie-Harper**	1	**7**	**7**
(United States) **C Benjamin**	**7**	**6**
(South Africa) K Schimper	5	1
(West Germany) **E Pfaff**	**6**	4	**7**
(United States) K Steinmetz	3	**6**	6
(United States) B Bowes	3	**7**	0
6	(Australia) **H Mandlíková**	**6**	5	**6**
7	(United States) G Magers	4	6
(United States) **K Rinaldi**	**6**	**7**
(Argentina) A Villagrán	**6**	3	3
(United States) **A Henricksson**	3	**6**	**6**
(United States) E Hakami	3	**7**	4
(United States) **G Fernández**	**6**	5	**6**
(Italy) **L Ferrando**	**6**	**6**
3	(Soviet Union) N Zvereva	4	4
5	(United States) **P Fendick**	**6**	**6**
(United States) W White	1	4
(Peru) P Vásquez	6	2
(United States) **M L Daniels**	**7**	**6**
(Australia) J Byrne	**6**	4	2
(United States) **K Adams**	3	**6**	**6**
(United States) C Cunningham	3	1
2	(Bulgaria) **M Maleeva**	**6**	**6**

Second round
1	(West Germany) **S Graf**	**6**	**6**
(United States) L-A Eldredge	0	1
(South Africa) D van Rensburg	5	**7**	3
8	(United States) **T Phelps**	**7**	5	**6**
(United States) P Louie-Harper	2	**7**	1
(United States) **C Benjamin**	**6**	6	**6**
(West Germany) E Pfaff	4	**6**	2
6	(Australia) **H Mandlíková**	**6**	3	**6**
(United States) K Rinaldi	**6**	2	2
(United States) **A Henricksson**	3	**6**	**6**
(United States) G Fernández	**7**	3	2
(Italy) **L Ferrando**	6	**6**	**6**
5	(United States) **P Fendick**	**6**	**6**
(United States) M L Daniels	3	1
(United States) **K Adams**	2	**6**	**6**
2	(Bulgaria) M Maleeva	**6**	3	3

Quarterfinals
1	(West Germany) **S Graf**	**6**	**6**
8	(United States) T Phelps	3	0
(United States) C Benjamin	5	5
6	(Australia) **H Mandlíková**	**7**	**7**
(United States) **A Henricksson**	**6**	5	**6**
(Italy) L Ferrando	3	**7**	4
5	(United States) P Fendick	**6**	6	6
(United States) **K Adams**	4	**7**	**7**

Semifinals
1	(West Germany) **S Graf**	**7**	**6**
6	(Australia) H Mandlíková	6	3
(United States) **A Henricksson**	**6**	4	**6**
(United States) K Adams	3	**6**	3

Final
1	(West Germany) **Steffi Graf**	**6**	**6**
(United States) Ann Henricksson	1	4
