= 1989 U.S. Women's Hard Court Championships – Doubles =

Doubles
- 1989 U.S. Women's Hard Court Championships
- 1988 Champions: (United States) Lori McNeil (Czechoslovakia) Helena Suková

Final
- Champions: (United States) Katrina Adams (United States) Pam Shriver
- Runners-up: (United States) Patty Fendick (Canada) Jill Hetherington
- Score: 3–6, 6–1, 6–4

Details
- Draw: 15
- Seeds: 4

Events
Singles	Doubles
← 1988 ·	U.S. Women's Hard Court Championships	· 1990 →

Lori McNeil and Helena Suková were the defending champions but did not compete that year.

Katrina Adams and Pam Shriver won in the final 3–6, 6–1, 6–4 against Patty Fendick and Jill Hetherington.

== Seeds ==
Champion seeds are indicated in bold text while text in italics indicates the round in which those seeds were eliminated. The top seeded team received a bye into the quarterfinals.

1. (United States) **Katrina Adams** / (United States) **Pam Shriver (champions)**
2. (United States) Patty Fendick / (Canada) Jill Hetherington (final)
3. (United States) Beth Herr / (United States) Candy Reynolds (first round)
4. (United States) Ann Henricksson / (Poland) Iwona Kuczyńska (first round)

== Draw ==
=== Key ===
- Q = Qualifier
- WC = Wild card
- LL = Lucky loser
- Alt = Alternate
- SE = Special exempt
- PR = Protected ranking
- ITF = ITF entry
- JE = Junior exempt
- w/o = Walkover
- r = Retired
- d = Defaulted
- SR = Special ranking

First round

Quarterfinals

Semifinals

Final

1
- (United States) **K Adams**
- (United States) **P Shriver**
**7**
**6**

- (United States) C Cunningham
- (United States) M Torres
1
2

- (United States) G Magers
- (United States) W White
6
2

- (United States) **G Magers**
- (United States) **W White**
**6**
**6**

1
- (United States) **K Adams**
- (United States) **P Shriver**
**6**
**6**

4
- (United States) A Henricksson
- (Poland) I Kuczyńska
4
3

- (Bulgaria) M Maleeva
- (West Germany) E Pfaff
1
4

- (United States) **L Allen**
- (United States) **K Steinmetz**
**6**
**6**

- (United States) L Allen
- (United States) K Steinmetz
5
**7**
0

- (United States) B Bowes
- (United States) T Phelps
**6**
1
5

- (Bulgaria) **M Maleeva**
- (West Germany) **E Pfaff**
**7**
5
**6**

- (Bulgaria) **M Maleeva**
- (West Germany) **E Pfaff**
3
**6**
**7**

1
- (United States) **Katrina Adams**
- (United States) **Pam Shriver**
3
**6**
**6**

- (United States) **E Hakami**
- (South Africa) **K Schimper**
**w/o**

2
- (United States) Patty Fendick
- (Canada) Jill Hetherington
**6**
1
4

- (Australia) H Mandlíková
- (United States) B Potter

- (United States) **E Hakami**
- (South Africa) **K Schimper**
**6**
6
**6**

- (Australia) **J Byrne**
- (United States) **K Rinaldi**
**6**
**6**

- (Australia) J Byrne
- (United States) K Rinaldi
2
**7**
2

3
- (United States) B Herr
- (United States) C Reynolds
3
4

- (United States) E Hakami
- (South Africa) K Schimper
6
1

- (Italy) L Ferrando
- (Argentina) A Villagrán
2
2

2
- (United States) **P Fendick**
- (Canada) **J Hetherington**
**7**
**6**

- (United States) **M L Daniels**
- (United States) **P Louie-Harper**
**6**
**6**

- (United States) M L Daniels
- (United States) P Louie-Harper
0
0

- (United States) C Benjamin
- (United States) L-A Eldredge
4
1

2
- (United States) **P Fendick**
- (Canada) **J Hetherington**
**6**
**6**

2
- (United States) **P Fendick**
- (Canada) **J Hetherington**
**6**
**6**
