= 1988 U.S. Women's Hard Court Championships – Singles =

Singles
- 1988 U.S. Women's Hard Court Championships

Final
- Champion: (West Germany) Steffi Graf
- Runner-up: (Bulgaria) Katerina Maleeva
- Score: 6–4, 6–1

Details
- Draw: 32
- Seeds: 8

Events
Singles	Doubles
U.S. Women's Hard Court Championships	· 1989 →

Steffi Graf won in the final 6–4, 6–1 against Katerina Maleeva.

== Seeds ==
A champion seed is indicated in bold text while text in italics indicates the round in which that seed was eliminated.

1. (West Germany) **Steffi Graf (champion)**
2. (Czechoslovakia) Helena Suková (semifinals)
3. (United States) Lori McNeil (semifinals)
4. (Bulgaria) Katerina Maleeva (final)
5. (Soviet Union) Natasha Zvereva (quarterfinals)
6. (France) Nathalie Tauziat (quarterfinals)
7. (United States) Patty Fendick (quarterfinals)
8. (Soviet Union) Larisa Savchenko (second round)

== Draw ==
=== Key ===
- Q = Qualifier
- WC = Wild card
- LL = Lucky loser
- Alt = Alternate
- SE = Special exempt
- PR = Protected ranking
- ITF = ITF entry
- JE = Junior exempt
- w/o = Walkover
- r = Retired
- d = Defaulted
- SR = Special ranking

First round
1	(West Germany) **S Graf**	**6**	**6**
(United States) C MacGregor	1	2
(United Kingdom) **S Gomer**	**6**	**6**
(Argentina) A Villagrán	3	2
(United States) **B Bowes**	**6**	**6**
(United States) M Torres	3	3
(United States) L Allen	**6**	6	2
6	(France) **N Tauziat**	4	**7**	**6**
3	(United States) **L McNeil**	**6**	**6**
(France) I Demongeot	1	1
(Australia) **N Provis**	**6**	**6**
(Canada) H Kelesi	4	3
(South Africa) R Fairbank	6	**6**	4
(Soviet Union) **L Meskhi**	**7**	2	**6**
(United States) G Magers	5	3
5	(Soviet Union) **N Zvereva**	**7**	**6**
8	(Soviet Union) **L Savchenko**	**6**	5	**6**
(United States) C Benjamin	1	**7**	0
(Japan) **E Inoue**	6	**6**	**7**
(United States) M Werdel	**7**	1	6
(Canada) J Hetherington	4	3
(Japan) **A Kijimuta**	**6**	**6**
(United Kingdom) J Durie	1	4
4	(Bulgaria) **K Maleeva**	**6**	**6**
7	(United States) **P Fendick**	**7**	**6**
(West Germany) S Meier	5	2
(United States) **M L Daniels**	2	**6**	**6**
(United States) C Christian	**6**	4	2
(United States) **K Keil**	4	**6**	**7**
(United States) A Grossman	**6**	4	6
(United States) T Mochizuki	2	3
2	(Czechoslovakia) **H Suková**	**6**	**6**

Second round
1	(West Germany) **S Graf**	**6**	**6**
(United Kingdom) S Gomer	3	2
(United States) B Bowes	**6**	6	2
6	(France) **N Tauziat**	4	**7**	**6**
3	(United States) **L McNeil**	**6**	4	**6**
(Australia) N Provis	4	**6**	3
(Soviet Union) L Meskhi	2	0
5	(Soviet Union) **N Zvereva**	**6**	**6**
8	(Soviet Union) L Savchenko	1	**6**	1
(Japan) **E Inoue**	**6**	4	**6**
(Japan) A Kijimuta	1	3
4	(Bulgaria) **K Maleeva**	**6**	**6**
7	(United States) **P Fendick**	**7**	**6**
(United States) M L Daniels	5	3
(United States) K Keil	1	4
2	(Czechoslovakia) **H Suková**	**6**	**6**

Quarterfinals
1	(West Germany) **S Graf**	**6**	**6**
6	(France) N Tauziat	3	2
3	(United States) **L McNeil**	3	**6**	**7**
5	(Soviet Union) N Zvereva	**6**	3	5
(Japan) E Inoue	**6**	2	3
4	(Bulgaria) **K Maleeva**	1	**6**	**6**
7	(United States) P Fendick	4	6
2	(Czechoslovakia) **H Suková**	**6**	**7**

Semifinals
1	(West Germany) **S Graf**	6	**6**	**6**
3	(United States) L McNeil	**7**	1	1
4	(Bulgaria) **K Maleeva**	**6**	6	**6**
2	(Czechoslovakia) H Suková	3	**7**	4

Final
1	(West Germany) **Steffi Graf**	**6**	**6**
4	(Bulgaria) Katerina Maleeva	4	1
