= 1995 DFS Classic – Doubles =

Doubles
- 1995 DFS Classic
- 1994 Champions: (United States) Zina Garrison-Jackson (Latvia) Larisa Neiland

Final
- Champions: (Netherlands) Manon Bollegraf (Australia) Rennae Stubbs
- Runners-up: (Australia) Nicole Bradtke (Australia) Kristine Radford
- Score: 3–6, 6–4, 6–4

Details
- Draw: 28
- Seeds: 8

Events
Singles	Doubles
← 1994 ·	Birmingham Classic	· 1996 →

Zina Garrison-Jackson and Larisa Neiland were the defending champions but only Garrison-Jackson competed that year with Katrina Adams.

Adams and Garrison-Jackson lost in the second round to Mercedes Paz and Shaun Stafford.

Manon Bollegraf and Rennae Stubbs won in the final 3–6, 6–4, 6–4 against Nicole Bradtke and Kristine Radford.

== Seeds ==
Champion seeds are indicated in bold text while text in italics indicates the round in which those seeds were eliminated. The top four seeded teams received byes into the second round.

1. (United States) Meredith McGrath / (Latvia) Larisa Neiland (withdrew)
2. (United States) Nicole Arendt / (United States) Pam Shriver (semifinals)
3. (Netherlands) **Manon Bollegraf** / (Australia) **Rennae Stubbs (champions)**
4. (Indonesia) Yayuk Basuki / (Argentina) Inés Gorrochategui (quarterfinals)
5. (South Africa) Elna Reinach / (France) Nathalie Tauziat (second round)
6. (United States) Katrina Adams / (United States) Zina Garrison-Jackson (second round)
7. (Italy) Laura Golarsa / (Netherlands) Caroline Vis (second round)
8. (Australia) Nicole Bradtke / (Australia) Kristine Radford (final)

== Draw ==
=== Key ===
- Q = Qualifier
- WC = Wild card
- LL = Lucky loser
- Alt = Alternate
- SE = Special exempt
- PR = Protected ranking
- ITF = ITF entry
- JE = Junior exempt
- w/o = Walkover
- r = Retired
- d = Defaulted
- SR = Special ranking

=== Finals ===
Semifinals
(Belgium) N Feber (Japan) A Sugiyama	3	**6**	1
8	**(Australia) Nicole Bradtke** **(Australia) Kristine Radford**	**6**	3	**6**
3	**(Netherlands) Manon Bollegraf** **(Australia) Rennae Stubbs**	3	**6**	**7**
2	(United States) N Arendt (United States) P Shriver	**6**	3	5

Final
8	(Australia) Nicole Bradtke (Australia) Kristine Radford	**6**	4	4
3	**(Netherlands) Manon Bollegraf** **(Australia) Rennae Stubbs**	3	**6**	**6**

=== Top half ===
First round
(Belgium) **N Feber** (Japan) **A Sugiyama**	**6**	**7**
(Australia) C Barclay (South Africa) R Nideffer	4	5
(Belgium) **E Callens** (United States) **D Scott**	**6**	2	**6**
(Canada) M Bernard (Canada) C Delisle	2	**6**	4
(France) S Amiach (United States) V Paynter	2	**6**	9
5	(South Africa) **E Reinach** (France) **N Tauziat**	**6**	4	**11**
(France) **I Demongeot** (Japan) **R Hiraki**	**6**	**6**
(United Kingdom) J Durie (United Kingdom) C Wood	3	3
(Australia) **R McQuillan** (Germany) **C Porwik**	**6**	3	**12**
(United Kingdom) V Lake (United States) K Po	4	**6**	10
Q	(Netherlands) Y Basting (Netherlands) P Kamstra	**6**	1	5
8	(Australia) **N Bradtke** (Australia) **K Radford**	4	**6**	**7**

Second round
LL	(South Africa) L Horn (Australia) D Jones	3	1
(Belgium) **N Feber** (Japan) **A Sugiyama**	**6**	**6**
(Belgium) **E Callens** (United States) **D Scott**	**6**	2	**6**
5	(South Africa) E Reinach (France) N Tauziat	2	**6**	4
4	(Indonesia) **Y Basuki** (Argentina) **I Gorrochategui**	**6**	**6**
(France) I Demongeot (Japan) R Hiraki	1	0
(Australia) R McQuillan (Germany) C Porwik	**6**	5	3
8	(Australia) **N Bradtke** (Australia) **K Radford**	3	**7**	**6**

Quarterfinals
(Belgium) **N Feber** (Japan) **A Sugiyama**	4	**6**	**6**
(Belgium) E Callens (United States) D Scott	**6**	3	4
4	(Indonesia) Y Basuki (Argentina) I Gorrochategui	4	2
8	(Australia) **N Bradtke** (Australia) **K Radford**	**6**	**6**

Semifinals
(Belgium) N Feber (Japan) A Sugiyama	3	**6**	1
8	(Australia) **N Bradtke** (Australia) **K Radford**	**6**	3	**6**

=== Bottom half ===
First round
7	(Italy) **L Golarsa** (Netherlands) **C Vis**	**6**	**6**
(Netherlands) M Koutstaal (Australia) L Pleming	2	1
WC	(United Kingdom) K Cross (United Kingdom) L Jelfs	5	5
(Italy) **S Farina** (Italy) **R Grande**	**7**	**7**
WC	(United Kingdom) T Wainwright (United Kingdom) J Ward	**6**	1	4
(Germany) **C Schneider** (Germany) **C Singer**	4	**6**	**6**
6	(United States) **K Adams** (United States) **Z Garrison-Jackson**	**6**	**6**
(United States) L Poruri (United States) M Tu	4	1
(Argentina) **M Paz** (United States) **S Stafford**	**7**	**7**
(Sweden) M Lindström (Sweden) M Strandlund	6	6
(United States) L McNeil (Netherlands) M Oremans	3	**6**	1
(Australia) **K Godridge** (Australia) **K Sharpe**	**6**	3	**6**

Second round
7	(Italy) L Golarsa (Netherlands) C Vis	**6**	6	4
(Italy) **S Farina** (Italy) **R Grande**	3	**7**	**6**
(Germany) C Schneider (Germany) C Singer	1	3
3	(Netherlands) **M Bollegraf** (Australia) **R Stubbs**	**6**	**6**
6	(United States) K Adams (United States) Z Garrison-Jackson	6	3
(Argentina) **M Paz** (United States) **S Stafford**	**7**	**6**
(Australia) K Godridge (Australia) K Sharpe	4	2
2	(United States) **N Arendt** (United States) **P Shriver**	**6**	**6**

Quarterfinals
(Italy) S Farina (Italy) R Grande	**6**	1	4
3	(Netherlands) **M Bollegraf** (Australia) **R Stubbs**	2	**6**	**6**
(Argentina) M Paz (United States) S Stafford	**7**	2	7
2	(United States) **N Arendt** (United States) **P Shriver**	6	**6**	**9**

Semifinals
3	(Netherlands) **M Bollegraf** (Australia) **R Stubbs**	3	**6**	**7**
2	(United States) N Arendt (United States) P Shriver	**6**	3	5

=== Qualifying draw ===
First qualifying round
1	(Japan) H Nagano (South Korea) S-H Park	4
**(Netherlands) Y Basting** **(Netherlands) P Kamstra**	**8**
**(Georgia (country)) N Louarsabishvili** **(Ukraine) E Tatarkova**	**8**
(United States) E deLone (Australia) N Pratt	6
(United States) R Jensen (Canada) V Webb	4
**(South Africa) L Horn** **(Australia) D Jones**	**8**
(Netherlands) K de Weille (France) C Dhenin	7
2	**(United States) E Hakami** **(United States) J Steven**	**9**

Second qualifying round
**(Netherlands) Y Basting** **(Netherlands) P Kamstra**	**8**
(Georgia (country)) N Louarsabishvili (Ukraine) E Tatarkova	4
**(South Africa) L Horn** **(Australia) D Jones**	**8**
2	(United States) E Hakami (United States) J Steven	4

Final qualifying round
**(Netherlands) Y Basting** **(Netherlands) P Kamstra**	**8**
(South Africa) L Horn (Australia) D Jones	6
