= 1989 U.S. Women's Hard Court Championships =

- Date: February 27 – March 5
- Edition: 24th
- Category: Category 3
- Draw: 32S / 16D
- Prize money: $200,000
- Surface: Hard / outdoor
- Location: San Antonio, Texas, U.S.

Champions

Singles
- (West Germany) Steffi Graf

Doubles
- (United States) Katrina Adams / (United States) Pam Shriver
| ← 1988 · | U.S. Women's Hard Court Championships | · 1990 → |

The 1989 U.S. Women's Hard Court Championships was a women's tennis tournament played on outdoor hard courts in San Antonio, Texas in the United States and was part of the Category 3 tier of the 1989 WTA Tour. The tournament ran from February 27 through March 5, 1989. First-seeded Steffi Graf won her second consecutive singles title at the event.

== Finals ==
=== Singles ===
(West Germany) Steffi Graf defeated (United States) Ann Henricksson 6–1, 6–4

- It was Graf's 3rd singles title of the year and the 33rd of her career.

=== Doubles ===
(United States) Katrina Adams / (United States) Pam Shriver defeated (United States) Patty Fendick / (Canada) Jill Hetherington 3–6, 6–1, 6–4

- It was Adams' 2nd title of the year and the 6th of her career. It was Shriver's 4th title of the year and the 120th of her career.
