= 1996 DFS Classic – Doubles =

Doubles
- 1996 DFS Classic
- 1995 Champions: (Netherlands) Manon Bollegraf (Australia) Rennae Stubbs

Final
- Champions: (Australia) Elizabeth Smylie (United States) Linda Wild
- Runners-up: (United States) Lori McNeil (France) Nathalie Tauziat
- Score: 6–3, 3–6, 6–1

Events
Singles	Doubles
← 1995 ·	Birmingham Classic	· 1997 →

Manon Bollegraf and Rennae Stubbs were the defending champions but only Stubbs competed that year with Lisa Raymond.

Raymond and Stubbs lost in the semifinals to Lori McNeil and Nathalie Tauziat.

Elizabeth Smylie and Linda Wild won in the final 6–3, 3–6, 6–1 against McNeil and Tauziat.

== Seeds ==
Champion seeds are indicated in bold text while text in italics indicates the round in which those seeds were eliminated. The top four seeded teams received byes into the second round.

1. (United States) Meredith McGrath / (Latvia) Larisa Savchenko (second round)
2. (United States) Lori McNeil / (France) Nathalie Tauziat (final)
3. (United States) Lisa Raymond / (Australia) Rennae Stubbs (semifinals)
4. (Indonesia) Yayuk Basuki / (Netherlands) Caroline Vis (second round)
5. (Belgium) Els Callens / (Belgium) Laurence Courtois (first round)
6. (Australia) Kerry-Anne Guse / (Japan) Rika Hiraki (first round)
7. (United States) Debbie Graham / (Australia) Kristine Radford (quarterfinals)
8. (South Africa) Rosalyn Nideffer / (United States) Pam Shriver (second round)

== Draw ==
=== Key ===
- Q = Qualifier
- WC = Wild card
- LL = Lucky loser
- Alt = Alternate
- SE = Special exempt
- PR = Protected ranking
- ITF = ITF entry
- JE = Junior exempt
- w/o = Walkover
- r = Retired
- d = Defaulted
- SR = Special ranking

=== Finals ===
Semifinals
(Australia) A Ellwood (Australia) R McQuillan	5	5
**(Australia) Elizabeth Smylie** **(United States) Linda Wild**	**7**	**7**
3	(United States) L Raymond (Australia) R Stubbs	**6**	1	2
2	**(United States) Lori McNeil** **(France) Nathalie Tauziat**	2	**6**	**6**

Final
**(Australia) Elizabeth Smylie** **(United States) Linda Wild**	**6**	3	**6**
2	(United States) Lori McNeil (France) Nathalie Tauziat	3	**6**	1

=== Top half ===
First round
(Federal Republic of Yugoslavia) T Ječmenica (Poland) A Olsza	**6**	2	5
(Finland) **N Dahlman** (United Kingdom) **C Wood**	2	**6**	**7**
(Italy) L Golarsa (United States) K Rinaldi-Stunkel	5	4
(Australia) **A Ellwood** (Australia) **R McQuillan**	**7**	**6**
(Sweden) M Lindström (Sweden) M Strandlund	1	**7**	4
8	(South Africa) **R Nideffer** (United States) **P Shriver**	**6**	6	**6**
LL	(Australia) D Jones (Austria) M Schnell	4	4
(Belgium) **N Feber** (Belgium) **D Van Roost**	**6**	**6**
LL	(Australia) S Drake-Brockman (Australia) T Musgrave	**6**	5	6
(Australia) **C Barclay** (Australia) **K Godridge**	4	**7**	**8**
(Australia) **E Smylie** (United States) **L Wild**	**6**	**6**
5	(Belgium) E Callens (Belgium) L Courtois	3	2

Second round
1	(United States) M McGrath (Latvia) L Savchenko	5	4
(Finland) **N Dahlman** (United Kingdom) **C Wood**	**7**	**6**
(Australia) **A Ellwood** (Australia) **R McQuillan**	**6**	**6**
8	(South Africa) R Nideffer (United States) P Shriver	3	1
4	(Indonesia) Y Basuki (Netherlands) C Vis	6	**6**	3
(Belgium) **N Feber** (Belgium) **D Van Roost**	**7**	3	**6**
(Australia) C Barclay (Australia) K Godridge	1	4
(Australia) **E Smylie** (United States) **L Wild**	**6**	**6**

Quarterfinals
(Finland) N Dahlman (United Kingdom) C Wood	3	**6**	4
(Australia) **A Ellwood** (Australia) **R McQuillan**	**6**	2	**6**
(Belgium) N Feber (Belgium) D Van Roost	3	**7**	1
(Australia) **E Smylie** (United States) **L Wild**	**6**	5	**6**

Semifinals
(Australia) A Ellwood (Australia) R McQuillan	5	5
(Australia) **E Smylie** (United States) **L Wild**	**7**	**7**

=== Bottom half ===
First round
7	(United States) **D Graham** (Australia) **K Radford**	**7**	**6**
(Slovenia) T Križan (Greece) C Papadáki	6	2
(United States) **E deLone** (Australia) **N Pratt**	4	**6**	**6**
(United Kingdom) V Lake (United Kingdom) S Smith	**6**	3	2
(Canada) **S Jeyaseelan** (Netherlands) **S Noorlander**	**7**	**6**
(Romania) C Cristea (United States) L Poruri	5	4
6	(Australia) K-A Guse (Japan) R Hiraki	**6**	4	3
(Croatia) **M Murić** (Japan) **M Saeki**	0	**6**	**6**
(Japan) N Kijimuta (Japan) Y Yoshida	5	3
(Russia) **J Lutrova** (Thailand) **T Tanasugarn**	**7**	**6**
(France) **I Demongeot** (France) **C Dhenin**	**7**	**6**
Q	(United Kingdom) C Taylor (United Kingdom) J Ward	5	1

Second round
7	(United States) **D Graham** (Australia) **K Radford**	**6**	**6**
(United States) E deLone (Australia) N Pratt	3	3
(Canada) S Jeyaseelan (Netherlands) S Noorlander	**6**	0	2
3	(United States) **L Raymond** (Australia) **R Stubbs**	4	**6**	**6**
(Croatia) **M Murić** (Japan) **M Saeki**	5	**6**	**6**
(Russia) J Lutrova (Thailand) T Tanasugarn	**7**	3	3
(France) I Demongeot (France) C Dhenin	1	4
2	(United States) **L McNeil** (France) **N Tauziat**	**6**	**6**

Quarterfinals
7	(United States) D Graham (Australia) K Radford	5	3
3	(United States) **L Raymond** (Australia) **R Stubbs**	**7**	**6**
(Croatia) M Murić (Japan) M Saeki	3	6
2	(United States) **L McNeil** (France) **N Tauziat**	**6**	**7**

Semifinals
3	(United States) L Raymond (Australia) R Stubbs	**6**	1	2
2	(United States) **L McNeil** (France) **N Tauziat**	2	**6**	**6**
