= 1988 U.S. Women's Hard Court Championships =

- Date: February 29 – March 5
- Edition: 23rd
- Category: Category 3
- Draw: 32S /16D
- Prize money: $200,000
- Surface: Hard / outdoor
- Location: San Antonio, TX, United States
- Venue: McFarlin Tennis Center

Champions

Singles
- (West Germany) Steffi Graf

Doubles
- (United States) Lori McNeil / (Czechoslovakia) Helena Suková
← 1969 ·	U.S. Women's Hard Court Championships	· 1989 →

The 1988 U.S. Women's Hard Court Championships was a women's tennis tournament played on outdoor hard courts at the McFarlin Tennis Center in San Antonio, Texas in the United States and was part of the Category 3 tier of the 1988 WTA Tour. It was the 23rd edition of the tournament and was held from February 29 through March 5, 1988. It was the first time the tournament was held since 1969. First-seeded Steffi Graf won the singles title and collected $40,000 first-prize money.

== Finals ==
=== Singles ===
(West Germany) Steffi Graf defeated (Bulgaria) Katerina Maleeva 6–4, 6–1

- It was Graf's 2nd title of the year and the 27th of her career.

=== Doubles ===
(United States) Lori McNeil / (Czechoslovakia) Helena Suková defeated (South Africa) Rosalyn Fairbank / (United States) Gretchen Magers 6–3, 6–7, 6–2

- It was McNeil's 3rd title of the year and the 14th of her career. It was Suková's 1st title of the year and the 29th of her career.
