= 1996 DFS Classic =

- Date: 10–16 June
- Edition: 15th
- Category: Tier III
- Draw: 56S / 28D
- Prize money: $164,250
- Surface: Grass / outdoor
- Location: Birmingham, United Kingdom
- Venue: Edgbaston Priory Club

Champions

Singles
- (United States) Meredith McGrath

Doubles
- (Australia) Elizabeth Smylie / (United States) Linda Wild
← 1995 ·	Birmingham Classic	· 1997 →

The 1996 DFS Classic was a women's tennis tournament played on grass courts at the Edgbaston Priory Club in Birmingham in the United Kingdom that was part of Tier III of the 1996 WTA Tour. It was the 15th edition of the tournament and was held from 10 June until 16 June 1996. Tenth-seeded Meredith McGrath won the singles title.

== Finals ==
=== Singles ===
(United States) Meredith McGrath defeated (France) Nathalie Tauziat 2–6, 6–4, 6–4

- It was McGrath's 4th title of the year and the 28th of her career.

=== Doubles ===
(Australia) Elizabeth Smylie / (United States) Linda Wild defeated (United States) Lori McNeil / (France) Nathalie Tauziat 6–3, 3–6, 6–1

- It was Smylie's only title of the year and the 38th of her career. It was Wild's 2nd title of the year and the 10th of her career.
