= 1991 U.S. Women's Hardcourt Championships =

- Date: March 25–31
- Edition: 26th
- Category: Tier III
- Draw: 32S / 16D
- Prize money: $225,000
- Surface: Hard / outdoor
- Location: San Antonio, Texas, U.S.
- Venue: McFarlin Tennis Center

Champions

Singles
- (Germany) Steffi Graf

Doubles
- (United States) Patty Fendick / (Australia) Elizabeth Smylie
← 1990 ·	U.S. Women's Hardcourt Championships	· 1992 →

The 1991 U.S. Women's Hardcourt Championships was a women's tennis tournament played on outdoor hard courts at the McFarlin Tennis Center in San Antonio, Texas in the United States and was part of the Tier III category of the 1991 WTA Tour. It was the 26th edition of the tournament and was held from March 25 through March 31, 1991. Second-seeded Steffi Graf, who entered the main draw on a wildcard, won the singles title, her third at the event after 1988 and 1989, and earned $45,000 first-prize money.

== Finals ==
=== Singles ===
(Germany) Steffi Graf defeated (Socialist Federal Republic of Yugoslavia) Monica Seles 6–4, 6–3

- It was Graf' 1st singles title of the year and the 55th of her career.

=== Doubles ===
(United States) Patty Fendick / (Socialist Federal Republic of Yugoslavia) Monica Seles defeated (Canada) Jill Hetherington / (United States) Kathy Rinaldi 7–6^{(7–2)}, 6–2

- It was Fendick's 2nd doubles title of the year and the 11th of her career. It was Seles' 1st doubles title of the year and the 2nd of her career.

== See also ==
- Graf–Seles rivalry
