= 1996 DFS Classic – Singles =

Singles
- 1996 DFS Classic

Final
- Champion: (United States) Meredith McGrath
- Runner-up: (France) Nathalie Tauziat
- Score: 2–6, 6–4, 6–4

Details
- Draw: 56 (8 Q / 3 WC )
- Seeds: 16

Events
Singles	Doubles
- Birmingham Classic

Zina Garrison-Jackson was the defending champion, but did not participate this year.

Meredith McGrath won the title, defeating Nathalie Tauziat in the final 2–6, 6–4, 6–4.

== Seeds ==
A champion seed is indicated in bold text while text in italics indicates the round in which that seed was eliminated. The top eight seeds received a bye to the second round.

1. (Netherlands) Brenda Schultz-McCarthy (semifinals)
2. (France) Nathalie Tauziat (final)
3. (Belarus) Natasha Zvereva (third round)
4. (United States) Linda Wild (second round)
5. (United States) Lisa Raymond (third round)
6. (United States) Lori McNeil (third round)
7. (Belgium) Dominique Van Roost (third round)
8. (Belgium) Laurence Courtois (quarterfinals)
9. (Netherlands) Miriam Oremans (semifinals)
10. (United States) **Meredith McGrath (champion)**
11. (Japan) Naoko Kijimuta (first round)
12. (Germany) Christina Singer (quarterfinals)
13. (Italy) Gloria Pizzichini (third round)
14. (United States) Gigi Fernández (third round)
15. (Belgium) Els Callens (quarterfinals)
16. (Federal Republic of Yugoslavia) Tatjana Ječmenica (second round)

== Draw ==
Key

- Q = Qualifier
- WC = Wild card
- LL = Lucky loser
- Alt = Alternate
- ITF = ITF entry
- PR = Protected ranking
- SR = Special ranking
- SE = Special exempt
- JE = Junior exempt
- JR = Junior Accelerator Programme entrant
- CO = College Accelerator Programme entrant
- NG = Next Gen Accelerator Program entrant
- w/o = Walkover
- r = Retired
- d = Defaulted

=== Finals ===
Quarterfinals
1	**(Netherlands) Brenda Schultz-McCarthy**	**6**	**7**
(Latvia) Larisa Neiland	2	6
10	**(United States) Meredith McGrath**	**6**	**6**
15	(Belgium) Els Callens	3	2
12	(Germany) Christina Singer	4	5
9	**(Netherlands) Miriam Oremans**	**6**	**7**
8	(Belgium) Laurence Courtois	0	2
2	**(France) Nathalie Tauziat**	**6**	**6**

Semifinals
1	(Netherlands) Brenda Schultz-McCarthy	**6**	3	4
10	(United States) **Meredith McGrath**	3	**6**	**6**
9	(Netherlands) Miriam Oremans	2	3
2	(France) **Nathalie Tauziat**	**6**	**6**

Final
10	(United States) **Meredith McGrath**	2	**6**	**6**
2	(France) Nathalie Tauziat	**6**	4	4

=== Top half ===
==== Section 1 ====
First round
(Netherlands) **P Kamstra**	**6**	**6**
(Italy) L Golarsa	0	4
(Luxembourg) **A Kremer**	2	**7**	**7**
(United States) E deLone	**6**	5	5
(Australia) K Godridge	3	2
13	(Italy) **G Pizzichini**	**6**	**6**
11	(Japan) N Kijimuta	**6**	5	4
(Latvia) **L Savchenko**	3	**7**	**6**
(Spain) P Hermida	**6**	2	4
Q	(Australia) **T Musgrave**	3	**6**	**6**
(France) **C Dhenin**	**7**	4	**6**
(Austria) M Schnell	5	**6**	4

Second round
1	(Netherlands) **B Schultz-McCarthy**	**6**	**7**
(Netherlands) P Kamstra	3	5
(Luxembourg) A Kremer	4	2
13	(Italy) **G Pizzichini**	**6**	**6**
(Latvia) **L Savchenko**	**6**	**7**
Q	(Australia) T Musgrave	2	5
(France) C Dhenin	3	5
7	(Belgium) **D Van Roost**	**6**	**7**

Third round
1	(Netherlands) **B Schultz-McCarthy**	6	**6**	**6**
13	(Italy) G Pizzichini	**7**	3	3
(Latvia) **L Savchenko**	2	**6**	**6**
7	(Belgium) D Van Roost	**6**	4	3

Quarterfinals
1	(Netherlands) **B Schultz-McCarthy**	**6**	**7**
(Latvia) L Savchenko	2	6

==== Section 2 ====
First round
WC	(United Kingdom) C Wood	3	1
(United States) **N Arendt**	**6**	**6**
Q	(Australia) K-A Guse	0	2
(Slovenia) **T Križan**	**6**	**6**
(Australia) A Ellwood	3	4
10	(United States) **M McGrath**	**6**	**6**
15	(Belgium) **E Callens**	**6**	**6**
(Australia) R McQuillan	4	3
(Belgium) **N Feber**	**7**	**6**
(Canada) S Jeyaseelan	6	1
(Venezuela) M Vento	2	3
WC	(United States) **P Shriver**	**6**	**6**

Second round
3	(Belarus) **N Zvereva**	**6**	**6**
(United States) N Arendt	4	4
(Slovenia) T Križan	3	3
10	(United States) **M McGrath**	**6**	**6**
15	(Belgium) **E Callens**	6	**7**	**6**
(Belgium) N Feber	**7**	5	3
WC	(United States) P Shriver	4	4
5	(United States) **L Raymond**	**6**	**6**

Third round
3	(Belarus) N Zvereva	1	0
10	(United States) **M McGrath**	**6**	**6**
15	(Belgium) **E Callens**	5	**7**	**6**
5	(United States) L Raymond	**7**	6	1

Quarterfinals
10	(United States) **M McGrath**	**6**	**6**
15	(Belgium) E Callens	3	2

=== Bottom half ===
==== Section 3 ====
First round
Q	(Netherlands) **S Noorlander**	**6**	**6**
Q	(Australia) N Pratt	2	3
(Finland) N Dahlman	6	3
(Romania) **C Cristea**	**7**	**6**
(Australia) R Stubbs	2	2
12	(Germany) **C Singer**	**6**	**6**
9	(Netherlands) **M Oremans**	**7**	**6**
WC	(United Kingdom) S Smith	5	3
(France) **I Demongeot**	**7**	**6**
(Canada) M Drake	6	3
(United States) K Po	**7**	0	3
Q	(Australia) **K Radford**	5	**6**	**6**

Second round
6	(United States) **L McNeil**	4	**6**	**6**
Q	(Netherlands) S Noorlander	**6**	2	4
(Romania) C Cristea	5	1
12	(Germany) **C Singer**	**7**	**6**
9	(Netherlands) **M Oremans**	**6**	**6**
(France) I Demongeot	2	3
Q	(Australia) **K Radford**	6	**6**	**6**
4	(United States) L Wild	**7**	2	3

Third round
6	(United States) L McNeil	3	**6**	3
12	(Germany) **C Singer**	**6**	1	**6**
9	(Netherlands) **M Oremans**	**6**	**6**
Q	(Australia) K Radford	3	2

Quarterfinals
12	(Germany) C Singer	4	5
9	(Netherlands) **M Oremans**	**6**	**7**

==== Section 4 ====
First round
Q	(United Kingdom) K Cross	2	2
(Sweden) **M Strandlund**	**6**	**6**
(United States) **K Rinaldi-Stunkel**	**7**	**7**
(Poland) A Olsza	5	6
(Japan) R Hiraki	0	**6**	4
16	(Federal Republic of Yugoslavia) **T Ječmenica**	**6**	4	**6**
14	(United States) **G Fernández**	**6**	**6**
(Argentina) I Gorrochategui	1	2
Q	(United Kingdom) **M Miller**	**6**	4	**6**
(United States) L Poruri	4	**6**	3
Q	(Thailand) **T Tanasugarn**	**6**	**6**
(United States) K Adams	4	4

Second round
8	(Belgium) **L Courtois**	**6**	**6**
(Sweden) M Strandlund	2	2
(United States) **K Rinaldi-Stunkel**	4	**6**	**6**
16	(Federal Republic of Yugoslavia) T Ječmenica	**6**	3	4
14	(United States) **G Fernández**	**7**	**7**
Q	(United Kingdom) M Miller	5	5
Q	(Thailand) T Tanasugarn	**6**	6	3
2	(France) **N Tauziat**	4	**7**	**6**

Third round
8	(Belgium) **L Courtois**	**7**	2	**6**
(United States) K Rinaldi-Stunkel	6	**6**	1
14	(United States) G Fernández	5	2
2	(France) **N Tauziat**	**7**	**6**

Quarterfinals
8	(Belgium) L Courtois	0	2
2	(France) **N Tauziat**	**6**	**6**
