= 1991 Virginia Slims of Albuquerque =

- Date: August 5–11
- Edition: 3rd
- Category: Tier IV
- Draw: 32S / 16D
- Prize money: $150,000
- Surface: Hard / outdoor
- Location: Albuquerque, New Mexico, United States
- Venue: Albuquerque Tennis Complex

Champions

Singles
- (United States) Gigi Fernández

Doubles
- (United States) Katrina Adams / (France) Isabelle Demongeot
- Virginia Slims of Albuquerque

The 1991 Virginia Slims of Albuquerque was a women's tennis tournament played on outdoor hard courts at the Albuquerque Tennis Complex in Albuquerque, New Mexico, in the United States that was part of the Tier IV category of the 1991 WTA Tour. It was the third and last edition of the tournament and was held from August 5 through August 11, 1991. Second-seeded Gigi Fernández won the singles title.

== Finals ==
=== Singles ===
(United States) Gigi Fernández defeated (France) Julie Halard 6–0, 6–2

- It was Fernández's only singles title of the year and the 2nd and last of her career.

=== Doubles ===
(United States) Katrina Adams / (France) Isabelle Demongeot defeated (South Africa) Lise Gregory / (United States) Peanut Louie Harper 6–7^{(2–7)}, 6–4, 6–3

- It was Adams' 1st doubles title of the year and the 12th of her career. It was Demongeot's only doubles title of the year and the 5th of her career.
