= 1992 Acura U.S. Hardcourt Championships =

- Date: March 23–29
- Edition: 27th
- Category: Tier III
- Draw: 32S / 16D
- Prize money: $225,000
- Surface: Hard / outdoor
- Location: San Antonio, Texas, U.S.
- Venue: McFarlin Tennis Center

Champions

Singles
- (United States) Martina Navratilova

Doubles
- (United States) Martina Navratilova / (United States) Pam Shriver
← 1991 ·	U.S. Women's Hardcourt Championships	· 1993 →

The 1992 Acura U.S. Hardcourt Championships was a women's tennis tournament played on outdoor hard courts at the McFarlin Tennis Center in San Antonio, Texas in the United States and was part of the Tier III category of the 1992 WTA Tour. It was the 27th edition of the tournament and was held from March 23 through March 29, 1992. First-seeded Martina Navratilova won the singles title and earned $45,000 first-prize money.

== Finals ==
=== Singles ===
(United States) Martina Navratilova defeated (France) Nathalie Tauziat 6–2, 6–1

- It was Navratilova' 2nd singles title of the year and the 159th of her career.

=== Doubles ===
(United States) Martina Navratilova / (United States) Pam Shriver defeated (United States) Patty Fendick / (Czechoslovakia) Andrea Strnadová 3–6, 6–2, 7–6^{(7–4)}

- It was Navratilova's 2nd doubles title of the year and the 160th of her career. It was Shriver' 2nd doubles title of the year and the 108th of her career.
