= 1990 U.S. Women's Hardcourt Championships =

- Date: March 28 – April 1
- Edition: 25th
- Category: Tier III
- Draw: 16S / 8D
- Prize money: $225,000
- Surface: Hard / outdoor
- Location: San Antonio, Texas, U.S.
- Venue: McFarlin Tennis Center

Champions

Singles
- (Socialist Federal Republic of Yugoslavia) Monica Seles

Doubles
- (United States) Kathy Jordan / (Australia) Elizabeth Smylie
← 1989 ·	U.S. Women's Hardcourt Championships	· 1991 →

The 1990 U.S. Women's Hardcourt Championships, also known by its sponsored name Post Cereals US Hardcourt, was a women's tennis tournament played on outdoor hard courts at the McFarlin Tennis Center in San Antonio, Texas in the United States and was part of the Tier III category of the 1990 WTA Tour. It was the 25th edition of the tournament and was held from March 28 through April 1, 1990. Second-seeded Monica Seles won the singles title and earned $45,000 first-prize money.

== Finals ==
=== Singles ===
(Socialist Federal Republic of Yugoslavia) Monica Seles defeated (Switzerland) Manuela Maleeva-Fragnière 6–4, 6–3

- It was Seles' 2nd singles title of the year and the 3rd of her career.

=== Doubles ===
(United States) Kathy Jordan / (Australia) Elizabeth Smylie defeated (United States) Gigi Fernández / (United States) Robin White 7–5, 7–5

- It was Jordan's 1st doubles title of the year and the 38th of her career. It was Smylie's 2nd doubles title of the year and the 26th of her career.
