= Nicole Bradtke =

Australian tennis player (born 1969)

- Country (sports): (Australia)
- Residence: Melbourne
- Born: 22 September 1969 (age 57) Melbourne, Australia
- Turned pro: 1986
- Retired: 1997
- Plays: Right-handed (two handed backhand)
- Prize money: $1,298,912

Singles
- Career record: 243–191
- Career titles: 3 WTA, 4 ITF
- Highest ranking: No. 24 (24 May 1993)

Grand Slam singles results
- Australian Open: 4R (1989, 1993)
- French Open: SF (1988)
- Wimbledon: 4R (1995)
- US Open: 3R (1987)

Doubles
- Career record: 222–164
- Career titles: 9 WTA
- Highest ranking: No. 11 (6 April 1992)

Grand Slam doubles results
- Australian Open: 3R (1992, 1996)
- French Open: SF (1988, 1990)
- Wimbledon: SF (1989)
- US Open: SF (1989)

Mixed doubles
- Career titles: 2

Grand Slam mixed doubles results
- Australian Open: W (1992)
- French Open: F (1990)
- Wimbledon: F (1987)
- US Open: W (1992)
Medal record
Olympic Games – Tennis
Bronze medal – third place	1992 Barcelona	Doubles

Nicole Bradtke (née Provis) (born 22 September 1969) is a retired professional tennis player from Australia.

Bradtke won three singles and nine doubles titles on the WTA Tour. She reached the semifinals of the 1988 French Open, and won a bronze medal in doubles at the 1992 Summer Olympics, partnering Rachel McQuillan. In mixed doubles, she reached four Grand Slam finals, winning two of those partnering Mark Woodforde. Bradtke reached career-high rankings of No. 24 in singles and No. 11 in doubles. She retired from professional tennis in 1997 after a shoulder injury.

== Professional career ==
The young Nicole Provis (Bradtke) started playing tennis at the age of seven. Whilst still at school, she played her first professional tennis match in 1985, and made her debut at the Australian Open later that year. She found early success in mixed doubles, finishing runner-up at the 1987 Wimbledon Championships with Darren Cahill.

Bradtke burst into prominence in 1988, when she made the semifinals of the French Open as a relative unknown. She beat Sybille Niox-Château, Emmanuelle Derly before defeating two seeded players, Claudia Kohde-Kilsch and Sylvia Hanika, as well as Arantxa Sánchez Vicario (who had earlier beaten Chris Evert) before losing to Natasha Zvereva, despite holding two match points.

In early 1989, she reached the top 30, but failed to fulfill her early promise and quickly settled into the lower top 100 range, despite making further fourth rounds at the 1989 Australian Open and the 1990 French Open and winning her first title at home in Brisbane in 1992.

She then went on to great success in mixed doubles, winning both the 1992 Australian Open and the 1992 US Open with her partner, Mark Woodforde; and women's doubles, earning a bronze medal at the 1992 Summer Olympics in Barcelona.

She enjoyed a minor resurgence in singles in 1993, winning her second tour title in Kuala Lumpur and reaching the fourth round of the Australian Open. She also earned her biggest career victory during that year, beating world No. 1 Steffi Graf in a Fed Cup tie. Bradtke later helped Australia to reach the final, where they lost to the Spanish team.

After playing only eight events in 1994, she dropped out of the top 100, before recovering in 1995, earning another big victory over Gabriela Sabatini at the tournament in Berlin and returning to the top 40 in the world.

Bradtke retired after the 1997 Australian Open.

== Personal life ==
She is married to Mark Bradtke, a former Australian professional basketball player, since 1994. Together they have two boys, Austin (born 2000) and Jensen (born 2004), and run an indoor sports centre in Melbourne. She previously served as a coach for the Australian Fed Cup team, as well as undertaking private coaching. She has worked with fellow Australians Samantha Stosur and Alicia Molik. In 2007, she joined the National High Performance Academy team.

Her sister Natasha is married to Todd Woodbridge, making him her brother-in-law.

Her eldest son Austin was selected by the Melbourne Football Club as a category B rookie in 2019 but delisted in 2021 without playing a senior game.

== Grand Slam finals ==
=== Mixed doubles: 4 (2 titles, 2 runners-up) ===
Result	Year	Championship	Surface	Partner	Opponents	Score
Loss	1987	Wimbledon	Grass	(Australia) Darren Cahill	(United Kingdom) Jo Durie (United Kingdom) Jeremy Bates	7–6^{(12–10)}, 6–3
Loss	1990	French Open	Clay	(South Africa) Danie Visser	(Spain) Arantxa Sánchez Vicario (Mexico) Jorge Lozano	7–6^{(7–5)}, 7–6^{(10–8)}
Win	1992	Australian Open	Hard	(Australia) Mark Woodforde	(Spain) Arantxa Sánchez Vicario (Australia) Todd Woodbridge	6–3, 4–6, 11–9
Win	1992	US Open	Hard	(Australia) Mark Woodforde	(Czechoslovakia) Helena Suková (Netherlands) Tom Nijssen	4–6, 6–3, 6–3

== WTA career finals ==
=== Singles (3–1) ===
Legend
Grand Slam (0)
Tour Championships (0)
Tier I (0)
Tier II (0)
Tier III (0)
Tier IV (3)
Tier V (0)

Result	W/L	Date	Tournament	Surface	Opponent	Score
Win	1–0	Jan 1992	Brisbane, Australia	Hard	(Australia) Rachel McQuillan	6–3, 6–2
Win	2–0	Apr 1993	Kuala Lumpur, Malaysia	Hard (i)	(United States) Ann Grossman	6–3, 6–2
Loss	2–1	May 1993	Lucerne, Switzerland	Clay	(United States) Lindsay Davenport	1–6, 6–4, 2–6
Win	3–1	Jan 1995	Auckland, New Zealand	Hard	(United States) Ginger Helgeson	3–6, 6–2, 6–1

=== Doubles (9–4) ===
Legend
Grand Slam (0)
Tour Championships (0)
Tier I (1)
Tier II (0)
Tier III (1)
Tier IV (5)
Tier V (2)

Result	W/L	Date	Tournament	Surface	Partner	Opponents	Score
Win	1–0	May 1988	Strasbourg, France	Clay	(Netherlands) Manon Bollegraf	(Australia) Jenny Byrne (Australia) Janine Thompson	7–5, 6–7^{(11–13)}, 6–3
Win	2–0	Aug 1989	Albuquerque, US	Hard	(South Africa) Elna Reinach	(Italy) Raffaella Reggi (Spain) Arantxa Sánchez Vicario	4–6, 6–4, 6–2
Win	3–0	May 1990	Berlin, West Germany	Clay	(South Africa) Elna Reinach	(Australia) Hana Mandlíková (Czechoslovakia) Jana Novotná	6–2, 6–1
Win	4–0	May 1990	Strasbourg, France	Clay	(South Africa) Elna Reinach	(United States) Kathy Jordan (Australia) Elizabeth Smylie	6–1, 6–4
Loss	4–1	May 1991	Rome, Italy	Clay	(South Africa) Elna Reinach	(United States) Jennifer Capriati (Socialist Federal Republic of Yugoslavia) Monica Seles	5–7, 2–6
Loss	4–2	May 1991	Berlin, Germany	Clay	(South Africa) Elna Reinach	(Soviet Union) Larisa Savchenko (Soviet Union) Natalia Zvereva	3–6, 3–6
Win	5–2	May 1991	Geneva, Switzerland	Clay	(Australia) Elizabeth Smylie	(Switzerland) Cathy Caverzasio (Switzerland) Manuela Maleeva	6–1, 6–2
Win	6–2	Jun 1991	Birmingham, UK	Grass	(Australia) Elizabeth Smylie	(United States) Sandy Collins (South Africa) Elna Reinach	6–3, 6–4
Loss	6–3	Jan 1992	Brisbane, Australia	Hard	(Netherlands) Manon Bollegraf	(Czechoslovakia) Jana Novotná (Latvia) Larisa Neiland	4–6, 3–6
Win	7–3	Feb 1992	Oklahoma, US	Hard (i)	(United States) Lori McNeil	(United States) Katrina Adams (Netherlands) Manon Bollegraf	3–6, 6–4, 7–6^{(8–6)}
Win	8–3	Jan 1993	Melbourne, Australia	Hard	(France) Nathalie Tauziat	(United States) Cammy MacGregor (United States) Shaun Stafford	1–6, 6–3, 6–3
Loss	8–4	Jun 1995	Birmingham, UK	Grass	(Australia) Kristine Kunce	(Netherlands) Manon Bollegraf (Australia) Rennae Stubbs	6–3, 4–6, 4–6
Win	9–4	May 1996	Strasbourg, France	Clay	(Indonesia) Yayuk Basuki	(United States) Marianne Witmeyer (United States) Tami Jones	5–7, 6–4, 6–4

== ITF Circuit finals ==
=== Singles (4–0) ===
$25,000 tournaments
$10,000 tournaments

Result	No.	Date	Tournament	Surface	Opponent	Score
Win	1.	31 October 1986	Sydney, Australia	Hard	(Australia) Michelle Bowrey	6–3, 6–3
Win	2.	3 December 1989	Melbourne, Australia	Hard	(Australia) Kate McDonald	1–6, 6–0, 7–5
Win	3.	27 November 1994	Bendigo, Australia	Hard	(Australia) Annabel Ellwood	6–4, 6–7, 6–2
Win	4.	17 December 1995	Nuriootpa, Australia	Hard	(Australia) Rachel McQuillan	7–5, 6–0

=== Doubles (0–1) ===
Result	No.	Date	Tournament	Surface	Partner	Opponents	Score
Loss	1.	31 October 1986	Sydney, Australia	Hard	(Australia) Louise Field	(Australia) Michelle Jaggard-Lai (Australia) Lisa O'Neill	w/o
