= Peanut Louie Harper =

American tennis player

Peanut Louie-Harper
- Country (sports): United States
- Residence: San Francisco, California, USA
- Born: 15 August 1960 (age 65) San Francisco, USA
- Height: 5 ft 5 in (1.65 m)
- Turned pro: 1978
- Retired: 1994
- Plays: Right-handed (two-handed backhand)

Singles
- Career record: 238–263
- Career titles: 4
- Highest ranking: No. 19 (1 April 1985)

Grand Slam singles results
- French Open: 3R (1978)
- Wimbledon: 3R (1980, 1987)
- US Open: 3R (1978, 1984)

Doubles
- Career record: 118–162
- Career titles: 5
- Highest ranking: No. 31 (6 April 1992)

Grand Slam doubles results
- French Open: 2R (1988)
- Wimbledon: 3R (1989)
- US Open: 3R (1980)

Grand Slam mixed doubles results
- French Open: 2R (1988)
- Wimbledon: 2R (1976, 1989)
- US Open: 3R (1978)

Mareen "Peanut" Louie-Harper (born Mareen Louie; August 15, 1960) is a retired American tennis player, born in San Francisco, California to Ron and Alice Louie.

She was a top-ranked junior tennis player and professional tennis player on the WTA tour. She reached a career high singles ranking of 19 in the world in 1985 and doubles ranking of 31 in the world in 1992. She is currently the co-founder and program director of Harper for Kids, a youth character development program.

== Professional tennis career ==
During her career, she won 14 USTA National Junior titles and was the #1 ranked 16-and-under (1976) and 12-and-under tennis player (1972) in the United States. Peanut was the Junior Wimbledon finalist in 1977 and a semifinalist in 1978. She was also the #1 ranked junior in NorCal in all age divisions (10, 12, 14, 16 & 18 & unders).

After a successful junior career, she turned pro in 1978. In her 16-year career, she won four singles titles and reached a career high ranking of No. 19 in the world (in 1985). She also won five doubles titles and reached a career high ranking of No. 31 in the world (in 1992). At the Grand Slams, her best results were reaching the round of 32 in singles and the round of 16 in doubles several times. Among her best wins were victories over Gabriela Sabatini, Zina Garrison, Mary Joe Fernández, Helena Suková, Wendy Turnbull, Stephanie Rehe and Andrea Jaeger.

Louie was honored with the WTA Karen Krantzcke Sportsmanship Award in back-to-back years in 1985 and 1986 from the Women's Tennis Association (WTA). In 1986, she was also named Tennis magazine's Comeback Player of the Year. During her junior career, she was presented with the USTA Girls’ 18 National Championship Sportsmanship Award in 1977.

== Personal life and post-tennis career ==
Her older sister, Marcie Louie, also played on the WTA Tour, and her sisters Cici and Marisa, and brother Ronnie, all played at the University of San Francisco. She, along with her siblings, trained on the tennis courts of Golden Gate Park. She was given the nickname "Peanut" by her father because she was the youngest of the five children.

She was inducted into the USTA Northern California Hall of Fame in 2000, the Multi-Ethnic Sports of Fame in 2017, the San Francisco Prep Hall of Fame in 2010, and the George Washington Athletic Hall of Fame in 1991.

She married Tim Harper in 1986. They live in San Francisco and have two children, Casey and Jared. Jared, who is a singer-songwriter, auditioned on Season 18 of The Voice

== Charity work ==
In 2008, she co-founded Harper for Kids (HFK), a children's nonprofit organization, with her husband Tim Harper. HFK's youth character development program is based on John Wooden's Pyramid of Success and teaches youth essential character traits that can help them achieve their personal best in life. HFK helps schools incorporate the Pyramid of Success into their character education. Before starting Harper for Kids, Peanut collaborated with John Wooden on his children's book Inch and Miles: The Journey to Success (Perfection Learning), with co-author Steve Jamison.

== Hall of Fame inductions ==
- Multi-Ethnic Sports Hall of Fame, 2017
- San Francisco Prep Hall of Fame, 2010
- USTA NorCal Hall of Fame, 2000
- George Washington High School Athletic Hall of Fame, 1991

== Awards and honors ==
- The Chinese Historical Society of America, 1986 recipient
- Tennis magazine's Comeback Player of the Year, 1986 recipient
- WTA Karen Krantzcke Sportsmanship Award, 1985 ad 1986
- USTA Girls’ 18 National Championship Sportsmanship Award
- OCA (Organization of Chinese Americans) East Bay Chapter
- Queen of Hearts Foundation, 2011 Honorary Chairperson
- OCA (Organization of Chinese Americans) San Mateo Chapter

== WTA career finals ==
=== Singles (4 titles, 1 runner-up) ===
Result	W–L	Date	Tournament	Surface	Opponent	Score
Win	1–0	Sep 1978	Avon Futures of Northern California, US	Hard	Ruta Gerulaitis	7–6, 6–2
Win	2–0	Mar 1980	Avon Futures of Columbus, US	Hard	(United States) Beth Norton	6–2, 6–3
Loss	2–1	Dec 1980	Tucson Open, U.S.	Carpet (i)	(United States) Tracy Austin	2–6, 0–6
Win	3–1	Apr 1984	Durban, South Africa	Hard	(South Africa) Rene Uys	6–1, 6–4
Win	4–1	Jan 1985	Virginia Slims of Denver, US	Carpet (i)	(United States) Zina Garrison	6–4, 4–6, 6–4

=== Doubles (5 titles, 5 runner-ups) ===
Result	Date	Tournament	Surface	Partner	Opponents	Score
Loss	Mar 1979	La Costa Tennis Classic	Hard	(United States) Marita Redondo	(United States) Marcie Louie (Czechoslovakia) Regina Maršíková	6–2, 2–6, 6–4
Win	Oct 1980	Hit-Union Japan Open	Hard	(United States) Dana Gilbert	(Australia) Nerida Gregory (Czechoslovakia) Marie Pinterová	7–5, 7–6
Loss	Mar 1981	Avon Championships of Los Angeles	Hard	(United States) Marita Redondo	(Australia) Susan Leo (United States) Kim Sands	6–1, 4–6, 6–1
Win	Apr 1984	Durban, South Africa	Hard	(United States) Anna-Maria Fernandez	(Brazil) Cláudia Monteiro (South Africa) Beverly Mould	7–5, 5–7, 6–1
Win	Jul 1984	Virginia Slims of Newport	Grass	(United States) Anna-Maria Fernandez	(United States) Lea Antonopolis (South Africa) Beverly Mould	7–5, 7–6^{(7–2)}
Loss	Sep 1987	Virginia Slims of New Orleans	Carpet (i)	(United States) Heather Ludloff	(United States) Zina Garrison (United States) Lori McNeil	6–3, 6–3
Win	Sep 1989	Virginia Slims of Arizona	Hard	(United States) Penny Barg	(United States) Elise Burgin (South Africa) Rosalyn Fairbank	7–6^{(16–14)}, 7–6^{(7–3)}
Loss	Aug 1990	Virginia Slims of Albuquerque	Hard	(United States) Wendy White	(United States) Meredith McGrath (United States) Anne Smith	7–6^{(7–2)}, 6–4
Loss	Aug 1991	Virginia Slims of Albuquerque	Hard	(South Africa) Lise Gregory	(United States) Katrina Adams (France) Isabelle Demongeot	6–7^{(2–7)}, 6–4, 6–3
Win	Oct 1991	Virginia Slims of Arizona	Hard	(United States) Cammy MacGregor	(United States) Sandy Colins (South Africa) Elna Reinach	7–5, 3–6, 6–3
