= Virginia Slims of Albuquerque =

Defunct tennis tournament
- Event name: Virginia Slims of Albuquerque
- Tour: WTA Tour
- Founded: 1989
- Abolished: 1991
- Editions: 3
- Location: Albuquerque, New Mexico, US
- Venue: Albuquerque Tennis Complex
- Surface: Hard

The Virginia Slims of Albuquerque is a defunct WTA Tour-affiliated women's tennis tournament played from 1989 to 1991. It was held at the Albuquerque Tennis Complex in Albuquerque, New Mexico in the United States and played on outdoor hard courts.

== Past finals ==
=== Singles ===
Year	Champions	Runners-up	Score
1989	(United States) Lori McNeil	(South Africa) Elna Reinach	6–1, 6–3
1990	(Czechoslovakia) Jana Novotná	(Peru) Laura Gildemeister	6–4, 6–4
1991	(United States) Gigi Fernández	(France) Julie Halard	6–0, 6–2

=== Doubles ===
Year	Champions	Runners-up	Score
1989	(Australia) Nicole Provis (South Africa) Elna Reinach	(Italy) Raffaella Reggi (Spain) Arantxa Sánchez Vicario	4–6, 6–4, 6–2
1990	(United States) Meredith McGrath (United States) Anne Smith	(United States) Mareen Louie-Harper (United States) Wendy White	7–6, 6–4
1991	(United States) Katrina Adams (France) Isabelle Demongeot	(South Africa) Lise Gregory (United States) Mareen Louie-Harper	6–7, 6–4, 6–3
