= 1986 Edgbaston Cup – Singles =

Singles
- 1986 Edgbaston Cup
- 1985 Champion: (United States) Pam Shriver

Final
- Champion: (United States) Pam Shriver
- Runner-up: (Bulgaria) Manuela Maleeva
- Score: 6–2, 7–6

Details
- Draw: 56
- Seeds: 14

Events
Singles	Doubles
← 1985 ·	Birmingham Classic	· 1987 →

Pam Shriver was the two-time defending champion and won in the final against Manuela Maleeva, 6–2, 7–6.

== Seeds ==
The top eight seeds receive a bye into the second round.

1. (United States) Pam Shriver (Champion)
2. (Bulgaria) Manuela Maleeva (final)
3. (Australia) Wendy Turnbull (third round)
4. (United States) Kathy Jordan (semifinals)
5. (United Kingdom) Jo Durie (second round)
6. (United States) Anne White (second round)
7. (United States) Robin White (second round)
8. (United States) Kate Gompert (second round)
9. (United States) Elise Burgin (first round)
10. (United States) Alycia Moulton (quarterfinals)
11. (South Africa) Rosalyn Fairbank (second round)
12. (United States) Susan Mascarin (first round)
13. (United States) Debbie Spence (first round)
14. (West Germany) Sylvia Hanika (second round)

== Draw ==
=== Key ===
- Q = Qualifier
- WC = Wild card
- LL = Lucky loser
- Alt = Alternate
- SE = Special exempt
- PR = Protected ranking
- ITF = ITF entry
- JE = Junior exempt
- w/o = Walkover
- r = Retired
- d = Defaulted
- SR = Special ranking

=== Finals ===
Quarterfinals
1	(United States) Pam Shriver	6	6
(Japan) Etsuko Inoue	1	4
(Soviet Union) Larisa Savchenko	7	6
(United States) Ann Henricksson	5	2
10	(United States) Alycia Moulton	3	3
4	(United States) Kathy Jordan	6	6
Q	(South Africa) Dianne Van Rensburg	5	4
2	(Bulgaria) Manuela Maleeva	7	6

Semifinals
1	(United States) Pam Shriver	6	6
(Soviet Union) Larisa Savchenko	2	1
4	(United States) Kathy Jordan	0	7	1
2	(Bulgaria) Manuela Maleeva	6	6	6

Final
1	(United States) Pam Shriver	6	7
2	(Bulgaria) Manuela Maleeva	2	6

=== Top half ===
==== Section 1 ====
First round
(Switzerland) C Jolissaint	5	1
(United States) P Fendick	7	6
(United States) B Nagelsen	6	6
(South Africa) J Mundel	4	3
Q	(Australia) J Byrne	6	7
12	(United States) S Mascarin	2	5
(United States) H Na	7	6
Q	(Japan) M Yanagi	6	4
(West Germany) E Pfaff	5	6	6
Q	(United States) S Collins	7	1	2
(Japan) E Inoue	6	7
Q	(United States) K Sands	4	6

Second round
1	(United States) P Shriver	6	7
(United States) P Fendick	3	6
(United States) B Nagelsen	6	6	6
Q	(Australia) J Byrne	7	1	1
(United States) H Na	6	3
(West Germany) E Pfaff	7	6
(Japan) E Inoue	7	4	6
5	(United Kingdom) J Durie	6	6	4

Third round
1	(United States) P Shriver	7	6
(United States) B Nagelsen	6	3
(West Germany) E Pfaff	1	2
(Japan) E Inoue	6	6

Quarterfinals
1	(United States) P Shriver	6	6
(Japan) E Inoue	1	4

==== Section 2 ====
First round
(United Kingdom) S Reeves	1	0
(United States) C Reynolds	6	6
(Soviet Union) L Savchenko	6	6
(United States) K Kinney	2	3
Q	(Brazil) C Monteiro	6	6
13	(United States) D Spence	4	1
9	(United States) E Burgin	3	4
(United Kingdom) S Gomer	6	6
Q	(United Kingdom) J Salmon	6	6
(Australia) J Tremelling	4	4
(United States) A Henricksson	6	6
(United States) C Benjamin	2	4

Second round
3	(Australia) W Turnbull	6	6
(United States) C Reynolds	2	3
(Soviet Union) L Savchenko	6	7
Q	(Brazil) C Monteiro	3	5
(United Kingdom) S Gomer	6	6
Q	(United Kingdom) J Salmon	1	4
(United States) A Henricksson	3	6	6
7	(United States) R White	6	4	2

Third round
3	(Australia) W Turnbull	5	2
(Soviet Union) L Savchenko	7	6
(United Kingdom) S Gomer	2	6
(United States) A Henricksson	6	7

Quarterfinals
(Soviet Union) L Savchenko	7	6
(United States) A Henricksson	5	2

=== Bottom half ===
==== Section 3 ====
First round
Q	(South Africa) E Reinach	6	6
(New Zealand) B Cordwell	0	3
(United States) L Antonoplis	4	2
(United States) W White	6	6
(United States) B Gerken	2	1
10	(United States) A Moulton	6	6
14	(West Germany) S Hanika	2	6	6
(United Kingdom) A Hobbs	6	4	3
(Australia) E Minter	2	4
(Australia) E Smylie	6	6
(France) N Tauziat	6	6
(Australia) A Tobin-Dingwall	3	2

Second round
8	(United States) K Gompert	1	6	4
Q	(South Africa) E Reinach	6	2	6
(United States) W White	3	6	1
10	(United States) A Moulton	6	2	6
14	(West Germany) S Hanika	4	2
(Australia) E Smylie	6	6
(France) N Tauziat	5	3
4	(United States) K Jordan	7	6

Third round
Q	(South Africa) E Reinach	0	4
10	(United States) A Moulton	6	6
(Australia) E Smylie	6	3
4	(United States) K Jordan	7	6

Quarterfinals
10	(United States) A Moulton	3	3
4	(United States) K Jordan	6	6

==== Section 4 ====
First round
(Netherlands) M Mesker	6	5	7
(United States) M Van Nostrand	2	7	5
(Argentina) A Villagrán	3	2
Q	(South Africa) D Van Rensburg	6	6
(Soviet Union) S Parkhomenko	5	4
11	(South Africa) R Fairbank	7	6
(South Africa) Y Vermaak	6	3	6
(United States) T Mochizuki	2	6	1
(Brazil) N Dias	7	6
(United Kingdom) A Croft	5	2
(United States) G Fernández	6	5	4
(United States) L McNeil	3	7	6

Second round
6	(United States) A White	6	5	4
(Netherlands) M Mesker	3	7	6
Q	(South Africa) D Van Rensburg	7	4	6
11	(South Africa) R Fairbank	6	6	3
(South Africa) Y Vermaak	4	0
(Brazil) N Dias	6	6
(United States) L McNeil	6	6	4
2	(Bulgaria) M Maleeva	7	2	6

Third round
(Netherlands) M Mesker	3	6	5
Q	(South Africa) D Van Rensburg	6	1	7
(Brazil) N Dias	0	0
2	(Bulgaria) M Maleeva	6	6

Quarterfinals
Q	(South Africa) D Van Rensburg	5	4
2	(Bulgaria) M Maleeva	7	6
