= 1988 Dow Classic – Doubles =

Doubles
- 1988 Dow Classic

Final
- Champions: (Soviet Union) Larisa Savchenko (Soviet Union) Natasha Zvereva
- Runners-up: (Soviet Union) Leila Meskhi (Soviet Union) Svetlana Parkhomenko
- Score: 6–4, 6–1

Events
Singles	Doubles
← 1987 ·	Birmingham Classic	· 1989 →

Larisa Savchenko and Natasha Zvereva won in the final 6–4, 6–1 against Leila Meskhi and Svetlana Parkhomenko.

== Seeds ==
Champion seeds are indicated in bold text while text in italics indicates the round in which those seeds were eliminated. The top four seeded teams received byes into the second round.

1. (United States) Lori McNeil / (United States) Betsy Nagelsen (quarterfinals)
2. (United States) Elise Burgin / (Australia) Elizabeth Smylie (quarterfinals)
3. (Soviet Union) Leila Meskhi / (Soviet Union) Svetlana Parkhomenko (final)
4. (Soviet Union) **Larisa Savchenko** / (Soviet Union) **Natasha Zvereva (champions)**
5. (France) Isabelle Demongeot / (France) Nathalie Tauziat (first round)
6. (United States) Katrina Adams / (United States) Penny Barg (second round)
7. (United Kingdom) Jo Durie / (United States) Sharon Walsh-Pete (first round)
8. (United States) Ann Henricksson / (Switzerland) Christiane Jolissaint (second round)

== Draw ==
=== Key ===
- Q = Qualifier
- WC = Wild card
- LL = Lucky loser
- Alt = Alternate
- SE = Special exempt
- PR = Protected ranking
- ITF = ITF entry
- JE = Junior exempt
- w/o = Walkover
- r = Retired
- d = Defaulted
- SR = Special ranking

=== Final ===
Final

3
(Soviet Union) Leila Meskhi
(Soviet Union) Svetlana Parkhomenko
4
1

4
- (Soviet Union) **Larisa Savchenko**
- (Soviet Union) **Natasha Zvereva**
**6**
**6**

=== Top half ===
First round

Second round

Quarterfinals

Semifinals

1
- (United States) **L McNeil**
- (United States) **B Nagelsen**
3
**6**
**6**

- (New Zealand) B Cordwell
- (United Kingdom) J Salmon
6
4

- (South Africa) L Gregory
- (United States) R Reis
**6**
1
0

- (South Africa) **L Gregory**
- (United States) **R Reis**
**7**
**6**

1
- (United States) L McNeil
- (United States) B Nagelsen
2
**6**
5

- (Hong Kong) **P Hy**
- (South Africa) **D Van Rensburg**
**6**
**6**

- (Australia) **L Field**
- (Australia) **M Jaggard**
**6**
3
**7**

- (Sweden) M Lindström
- (West Germany) C Porwik
3
1

- (Hong Kong) P Hy
- (South Africa) D Van Rensburg
5
2

- (Australia) **L Field**
- (Australia) **M Jaggard**
**7**
**6**

- (Australia) **L Field**
- (Australia) **M Jaggard**
**7**
**6**

7
- (United Kingdom) J Durie
- (United States) S Walsh-Pete
6
4

- (Australia) L Field
- (Australia) M Jaggard
4
6

3
- (Soviet Union) **L Meskhi**
- (Soviet Union) **S Parkhomenko**
**6**
**7**

3
- (Soviet Union) **L Meskhi**
- (Soviet Union) **S Parkhomenko**
6
**6**
**6**

- (United States) H Ludloff
- (South Africa) E Reinach
**7**
3
2

- (United States) S Collins
- (United States) H Na
**7**
3
0

- (United States) **S Collins**
- (United States) **H Na**
5
**6**
**6**

3
- (Soviet Union) **L Meskhi**
- (Soviet Union) **S Parkhomenko**
**6**
**6**

- (United Kingdom) V Lake
- (United Kingdom) C Wood
**7**
6
8

- (United States) A-M Fernandez
- (New Zealand) J Richardson
4
2

- (United States) **A M Fernandez**
- (New Zealand) **J Richardson**
5
**7**
**10**

- (United States) **A M Fernandez**
- (New Zealand) **J Richardson**
**6**
**6**

- (United States) **P Fendick**
- (Canada) **J Hetherington**
**6**
6
**7**

- (United States) P Fendick
- (Canada) J Hetherington
4
4

5
- (France) I Demongeot
- (France) N Tauziat
3
**7**
5

=== Bottom half ===
First round

Second round

Quarterfinals

Semifinals

6
- (United States) **K Adams**
- (United States) **P Barg**
**6**
**6**

- (South Africa) K Schimper
- (United States) W Wood
2
4

6
- (United States) K Adams
- (United States) P Barg
6
3

- (United States) C Reynolds
- (United States) P Smith
2
**6**
6

- (West Germany) **E Pfaff**
- (Australia) **J Tremelling**
**7**
**6**

- (West Germany) **E Pfaff**
- (Australia) **J Tremelling**
**6**
4
**8**

- (West Germany) E Pfaff
- (Australia) J Tremelling
2
1

- (Soviet Union) N Bykova
- (Soviet Union) N Medvedeva
4
2

4
- (Soviet Union) **L Savchenko**
- (Soviet Union) **N Zvereva**
**6**
**6**

- (United States) **L Antonoplis**
- (United States) **B Gerken**
**6**
**6**

- (United States) L Antonoplis
- (United States) B Gerken
6
4

4
- (Soviet Union) **L Savchenko**
- (Soviet Union) **N Zvereva**
**7**
**6**

4
- (Soviet Union) **L Savchenko**
- (Soviet Union) **N Zvereva**
**6**
**6**

8
- (United States) **A Henricksson**
- (Switzerland) **C Jolissaint**
**6**
**6**

- (South Africa) R Fairbank
- (United States) W White
4
4

- (Australia) L O'Neill
- (United States) J Smoller
3
0

8
- (United States) A Henricksson
- (Switzerland) C Jolissaint
**7**
4
4

- (South Africa) **R Fairbank**
- (United States) **W White**
**6**
**6**

- (South Africa) **R Fairbank**
- (United States) **W White**
6
**6**
**6**

- (Australia) E Minter
- (Australia) A Scott
4
4

- (South Africa) **R Fairbank**
- (United States) **W White**
**6**
3
**6**

- (Netherlands) **M Bollegraf**
- (Netherlands) **I Driehuis**
**6**
**6**

2
- (United States) E Burgin
- (Australia) E Smylie
4
**6**
4

- (United States) E Hakami
- (United States) T Phelps
3
3

- (Netherlands) M Bollegraf
- (Netherlands) I Driehuis
2
3

2
- (United States) **E Burgin**
- (Australia) **E Smylie**
**6**
**6**
