= 1987 Dow Chemical Classic – Singles =

Singles
- 1987 Dow Chemical Classic

Final
- Champion: (United States) Pam Shriver
- Runner-up: (Soviet Union) Larisa Savchenko
- Score: 4–6, 6–2, 6–2

Details
- Draw: 56
- Seeds: 14

Events
Singles	Doubles
← 1986 ·	Birmingham Classic	· 1988 →

Pam Shriver was the three-time defending champion and won in the final against Larisa Savchenko, 4–6, 6–2, 6–2.

== Seeds ==
The top eight seeds receive a bye into the second round.

1. (United States) Pam Shriver (champion)
2. (United States) Lori McNeil (third round)
3. (West Germany) Bettina Bunge (second round)
4. (Sweden) Catarina Lindqvist (second round)
5. (Australia) Elizabeth Smylie (quarterfinals)
6. (West Germany) Sylvia Hanika (second round)
7. (Canada) Carling Bassett (quarterfinals)
8. (Soviet Union) Larisa Savchenko (final)
9. (Japan) Etsuko Inoue (semifinals)
10. (United States) Terry Phelps (first round)
11. (South Africa) Rosalyn Fairbank (quarterfinals)
12. (France) Nathalie Tauziat (quarterfinals)
13. (France) Catherine Tanvier (second round)
14. (United Kingdom) Jo Durie (first round)

== Draw ==
=== Key ===
- Q = Qualifier
- WC = Wild card
- LL = Lucky loser
- Alt = Alternate
- SE = Special exempt
- PR = Protected ranking
- ITF = ITF entry
- JE = Junior exempt
- w/o = Walkover
- r = Retired
- d = Defaulted
- SR = Special ranking

=== Finals ===
Quarterfinals
1	(United States) Pam Shriver	6	6
12	(France) Nathalie Tauziat	0	1
9	(Japan) Etsuko Inoue	6	6
7	(Canada) Carling Bassett	2	0
5	(Australia) Elizabeth Smylie	1	3
(West Germany) Eva Pfaff	6	6
8	(Soviet Union) Larisa Savchenko	7	6
11	(South Africa) Rosalyn Fairbank	5	4

Semifinals
1	(United States) Pam Shriver	6	6
(Japan) Etsuko Inoue	2	4
(West Germany) Eva Pfaff	3	0
8	(Soviet Union) Larisa Savchenko	6	6

Final
1	(United States) Pam Shriver	4	6	6
8	(Soviet Union) Larisa Savchenko	6	2	2

=== Top half ===
==== Section 1 ====
First round
(United States) T Mochizuki	4	3
(South Africa) E Reinach	6	6
Q	(France) P Paradis	4	6	1
(South Africa) D Van Rensburg	6	4	6
Q	(South Africa) K Schimper	0	6	1
13	(France) C Tanvier	6	3	6
12	(France) N Tauziat	6	5	9
(Australia) E Minter	4	7	7
(United States) A Moulton	6	3	3
(Soviet Union) N Bykova	3	6	6
(United Kingdom) A Croft	6	6
(United States) E Burgin	7	7

Second round
1	(United States) P Shriver	6	6
(South Africa) E Reinach	4	2
(South Africa) D Van Rensburg	6	6
13	(France) C Tanvier	1	2
12	(France) N Tauziat	6	6
(Soviet Union) N Bykova	4	2
(United States) E Burgin	6	6	6
6	(West Germany) S Hanika	7	3	2

Third round
1	(United States) P Shriver	6	6
(South Africa) D Van Rensburg	2	3
12	(France) N Tauziat	4	6	6
(United States) E Burgin	6	3	3

Quarterfinals
1	(United States) P Shriver	6	6
(France) N Tauziat	0	1

==== Section 2 ====
First round
(Soviet Union) S Parkhomenko	6	6	6
(Australia) L Field	7	4	2
(United States) B Gerken	6	6	2
(United States) B Herr	7	3	6
Q	(Netherlands) N Jagerman	3	4
9	(Japan) E Inoue	6	6
(United States) A Henricksson	6	6
(Brazil) N Dias	3	3
(United States) P Casale	4	7	9
(United States) S Walsh-Pete	6	6	11
(United Kingdom) S Gomer	6	6
(United Kingdom) S Reeves	3	1

Second round
3	(West Germany) B Bunge	6	5	2
(Soviet Union) S Parkhomenko	1	7	6
(United States) B Herr	4	2
9	(Japan) E Inoue	6	6
(United States) A Henricksson	5	6
(United States) S Walsh-Pete	7	7
(United Kingdom) S Gomer	5	2
7	(Canada) C Bassett	7	6

Third round
(Soviet Union) S Parkhomenko	1	4
9	(Japan) E Inoue	6	6
(United States) S Walsh-Pete	7	6	1
7	(Canada) C Bassett	6	7	6

Quarterfinals
9	(Japan) E Inoue	6	6
7	(Canada) C Bassett	2	0

=== Bottom half ===
==== Section 3 ====
First round
(United States) K Keil	6	6
(Australia) A Minter	1	1
(Australia) N Provis	0	4
Q	(United Kingdom) V Lake	6	6
(Japan) A Kijimuta	4	7	7
14	(United Kingdom) J Durie	6	5	5
(United States) A Henricksson	2	2
(France) I Demongeot	6	6
(West Germany) E Pfaff	7	6
(United States) C Benjamin	6	4
LL	(Sweden) M Lindström	2	4
(United States) A White	6	6

Second round
5	(Australia) E Smylie	6	6
(United States) K Keil	2	3
Q	(United Kingdom) V Lake	7	1	6
(Japan) A Kijimuta	6	6	4
(France) I Demongeot	4	2
(West Germany) E Pfaff	6	6
(United States) A White	6	6
4	(Sweden) C Lindqvist	3	4

Third round
5	(Australia) E Smylie	6	6
Q	(United Kingdom) V Lake	2	4
(West Germany) E Pfaff	5	6	8
(United States) A White	7	4	6

Quarterfinals
5	(Australia) E Smylie	1	3
(West Germany) E Pfaff	6	6

==== Section 4 ====
First round
(United Kingdom) J Salmon	6	3	3
Q	(New Zealand) B Cordwell	3	6	6
(United Kingdom) A Hobbs	6	6
Q	(Australia) S Leo	1	4
(United States) W White	6	7
10	(United States) T Phelps	4	6
11	(South Africa) R Fairbank	6	6
(United States) B Bowes	2	1
(Australia) J Byrne	3	3
Q	(Japan) K Okamoto	6	6
(United States) G Magers	6	6
(Czechoslovakia) J Novotná	4	2

Second round
8	(Soviet Union) L Savchenko	6	6
Q	(New Zealand) B Cordwell	1	2
(United Kingdom) A Hobbs	6	6
(United States) W White	4	4
11	(South Africa) R Fairbank	7	7
Q	(Japan) K Okamoto	6	5
(United States) G Magers	4	2
2	(United States) L McNeil	6	6

Third round
8	(Soviet Union) L Savchenko	6	6
(United Kingdom) A Hobbs	3	1
11	(South Africa) R Fairbank	6	2	6
2	(United States) L McNeil	4	6	2

Quarterfinals
8	(Soviet Union) L Savchenko	7	6
11	(South Africa) R Fairbank	5	4
