= 1990 Dow Classic =

- Date: 11–17 June
- Edition: 9th
- Category: Tier IV
- Draw: 56S / 28D
- Surface: Grass / outdoor
- Location: Birmingham, United Kingdom
- Venue: Edgbaston Priory Club

Champions

Singles
- (United States) Zina Garrison

Doubles
- (Soviet Union) Larisa Savchenko-Neiland / (Soviet Union) Natalia Zvereva
← 1989 ·	Birmingham Classic	· 1991 →

The 1990 Dow Classic was a women's tennis tournament played on outdoor grass courts that was part of Tier IV of the 1990 WTA Tour. It was the 9th edition of the event. It took place at the Edgbaston Priory Club in Birmingham, United Kingdom, from 11 June until 17 June 1990. Zina Garrison won the singles title.

== Entrants ==
=== Seeds ===
Athlete	Nationality	Seeding
Zina Garrison	United States	1
Helena Suková	Czechoslovakia	2
Rosalyn Fairbank-Nideffer	South Africa	3
Nathalie Tauziat	France	4
Gigi Fernández	United States	5
Gretchen Magers	United States	6
Anne Smith	United States	7
Larisa Savchenko-Neiland	Soviet Union	8
~~Dinky Van Rensburg~~	~~South Africa~~	~~9~~
Laura Golarsa	Italy	10
Amanda Coetzer	South Africa	11
Lori McNeil	United States	12
Angélica Gavaldón	Mexico	13
Betsy Nagelsen	United States	14
Nana Miyagi	Japan	15
Claudia Kohde-Kilsch	West Germany	16
Etsuko Inoue	Japan	17

=== Other entrants ===
The following players received wildcards into the main draw:

- (United Kingdom) Sara Gomer
- (United Kingdom) Samantha Smith
- (United Kingdom) Clare Wood

The following players received entry from the qualifying draw:

- (Netherlands) Carin Bakkum
- (Canada) Jill Hetherington
- (United States) Kathy Jordan
- (Sweden) Maria Lindström
- (United States) Heather Ludloff
- (New Zealand) Julie Richardson
- (United Kingdom) Julie Salmon
- (France) Catherine Suire

== Finals ==
=== Singles ===
(United States) Zina Garrison defeated (Czechoslovakia) Helena Suková 6–4, 6–1

- It was Garrison's first title of the year and the 10th of her career.

=== Doubles ===
(Soviet Union) Larisa Savchenko-Neiland / (Soviet Union) Natalia Zvereva defeated (South Africa) Lise Gregory / (United States) Gretchen Magers 3–6, 6–3, 6–3

- It was Savchenko-Neiland's first doubles title of the year and the 15th of her career. It was Zvereva's first doubles title of the year and the 8th of her career.
