= 1988 Dow Classic – Singles =

Singles
- 1988 Dow Classic
- 1987 Champion: (United States) Pam Shriver

Final
- Champion: (West Germany) Claudia Kohde-Kilsch
- Runner-up: (United States) Pam Shriver
- Score: 6–2, 6–1

Details
- Draw: 56
- Seeds: 16

Events
Singles	Doubles
← 1987 ·	Birmingham Classic	· 1989 →

Pam Shriver was the four-time defending champion but lost in the final 6–2, 6–1 against Claudia Kohde-Kilsch.

== Seeds ==
A champion seed is indicated in bold text while text in italics indicates the round in which that seed was eliminated. The top nine seeds received a bye to the second round.

1. (United States) Pam Shriver (final)
2. (West Germany) **Claudia Kohde-Kilsch (champion)**
3. (United States) Lori McNeil (semifinals)
4. (United States) Zina Garrison (semifinals)
5. (Soviet Union) Larisa Savchenko (third round)
6. n/a
7. (Australia) Anne Minter (quarterfinals)
8. (France) Nathalie Tauziat (third round)
9. (Soviet Union) Leila Meskhi (second round)
10. (Japan) Etsuko Inoue (second round)
11. (United States) Elly Hakami (first round)
12. (France) Isabelle Demongeot (first round)
13. (United States) Gigi Fernández (first round)
14. (South Africa) Rosalyn Fairbank (third round)

== Draw ==
=== Key ===
- Q = Qualifier
- WC = Wild card
- LL = Lucky loser
- Alt = Alternate
- SE = Special exempt
- PR = Protected ranking
- ITF = ITF entry
- JE = Junior exempt
- w/o = Walkover
- r = Retired
- d = Defaulted
- SR = Special ranking

=== Finals ===
Semifinals
1	(United States) **Pam Shriver**	**6**	4	**6**
3	(United States) Lori McNeil	1	**6**	3
4	(United States) Zina Garrison	2	4
2	(West Germany) **Claudia Kohde-Kilsch**	**6**	**6**

Final
1	(United States) Pam Shriver	2	1
2	(West Germany) **Claudia Kohde-Kilsch**	**6**	**6**

=== Top half ===
==== Section 1 ====
First round
(Australia) **E Smylie**	**7**	2	**6**
(United Kingdom) J Salmon	6	**6**	3
(United Kingdom) V Lake	3	**6**	1
(South Africa) **D Van Rensburg**	**6**	4	**6**
(West Germany) C Porwik	3	**7**	3
(United States) **W White**	**6**	6	**6**
14	(South Africa) **R Fairbank**	**6**	**6**
Q	(United Kingdom) S Godman	3	3
(United States) S Walsh-Pete	5	**6**	4
(Switzerland) **E Krapl**	**7**	2	**6**
Q	(United States) **R Reis**	**6**	**6**
Q	(United States) K Steinmetz	1	0

Second round
1	(United States) **P Shriver**	**7**	**6**
(Australia) E Smylie	5	3
(South Africa) **D Van Rensburg**	**6**	1	**6**
(United States) W White	3	**6**	3
14	(South Africa) **R Fairbank**	**6**	**6**
(Switzerland) E Krapl	2	3
Q	(United States) **R Reis**	2	**7**	**6**
9	(Soviet Union) L Meskhi	**6**	6	1

Third round
1	(United States) **P Shriver**	**6**	**7**
(South Africa) D Van Rensburg	3	5
14	(South Africa) **R Fairbank**	**6**	**6**
Q	(United States) R Reis	3	4

Quarterfinals
1	(United States) **P Shriver**	**6**	**6**
14	(South Africa) R Fairbank	2	1

==== Section 2 ====
First round
(United States) **A Henricksson**	**6**	**6**
(Sweden) M Lindström	4	1
(United States) E Burgin	5	6
(United Kingdom) **J Durie**	**7**	**7**
(United States) **T Phelps**	**6**	**6**
12	(France) I Demongeot	4	4
(Japan) A Kijimuta	3	**6**	2
(United States) **B Nagelsen**	**6**	4	**6**
(Netherlands) H Witvoet	4	**7**	4
(Italy) **L Golarsa**	**6**	6	**6**
Q	(Japan) M Yanagi	0	**6**	1
(Soviet Union) **S Parkhomenko**	**6**	4	**6**

Second round
3	(United States) **L McNeil**	**7**	**6**
(United States) A Henricksson	6	4
(United Kingdom) **J Durie**	**6**	**6**
(United States) T Phelps	3	2
(United States) **B Nagelsen**	**6**	**6**
(Italy) L Golarsa	1	4
(Soviet Union) S Parkhomenko	4	5
7	(Australia) **A Minter**	**6**	**7**

Third round
3	(United States) **L McNeil**	4	**6**	**8**
(United Kingdom) J Durie	**6**	2	6
(United States) B Nagelsen	5	2
7	(Australia) **A Minter**	**7**	**6**

Quarterfinals
3	(United States) **L McNeil**	**6**	4	**6**
7	(Australia) A Minter	3	**6**	1

=== Bottom half ===
==== Section 3 ====
First round
(South Africa) K Schimper	2	2
(West Germany) **E Pfaff**	**6**	**6**
LL	(United States) **K Adams**	**7**	**6**
Q	(Switzerland) C Jolissaint	6	4
(South Africa) **E Reinach**	**6**	4	**8**
13	(United States) G Fernández	3	**6**	6
10	(Japan) **E Inoue**	**7**	**6**
(Canada) J Hetherington	6	2
(United Kingdom) **S Gomer**	**6**	**6**
Q	(Soviet Union) N Medvedeva	4	0
(United States) **H Ludloff**	**6**	6	**6**
Q	(Australia) L Field	2	**7**	3

Second round
5	(Soviet Union) **L Savchenko**	**7**	3	**6**
(West Germany) E Pfaff	6	**6**	1
LL	(United States) K Adams	3	1
(South Africa) **E Reinach**	**6**	**6**
10	(Japan) E Inoue	**6**	4	2
(United Kingdom) **S Gomer**	2	**6**	**6**
(United States) H Ludloff	1	2
4	(United States) **Z Garrison**	**6**	**6**

Third round
5	(Soviet Union) L Savchneko	1	1
(South Africa) **E Reinach**	**6**	**6**
(United Kingdom) S Gomer	3	2
4	(United States) **Z Garrison**	**6**	**6**

Quarterfinals
(South Africa) E Reinach	2	5
4	(United States) **Z Garrison**	**6**	**7**

==== Section 4 ====
First round
(United States) B Gerken	2	2
(Australia) **M Jaggard**	**6**	**6**
(United States) H Na	4	**6**	5
(West Germany) **C Singer**	**6**	2	**7**
Q	(Japan) K Okamoto	5	1
(New Zealand) **B Cordwell**	**7**	**6**
11	(United States) E Hakami	2	**7**	2
(United States) **C Benjamin**	**6**	6	**6**
(Netherlands) **M Bollegraf**	**6**	**6**
(United Kingdom) C Wood	3	2
(Soviet Union) N Bykova	5	4
(Australia) **E Minter**	**7**	**6**

Second round
8	(France) **N Tauziat**	2	**6**	**6**
(Australia) M Jaggard	**6**	3	1
(West Germany) C Singer	2	6
(New Zealand) **B Cordwell**	**6**	**7**
(United States) **C Benjamin**	3	**6**	**6**
(Netherlands) M Bollegraf	**6**	2	4
(Australia) E Minter	0	2
2	(West Germany) **C Kohde-Kilsch**	**6**	**6**

Third round
8	(France) N Tauziat	6	3
(New Zealand) **B Cordwell**	**7**	**6**
(United States) C Benjamin	2	0
2	(West Germany) **C Kohde-Kilsch**	**6**	**6**

Quarterfinals
(New Zealand) B Cordwell	2	6
2	(West Germany) **C Kohde-Kilsch**	**6**	**7**
