= 1989 Dow Classic – Singles =

Singles
- 1989 Dow Classic
- 1988 Champion: (West Germany) Claudia Kohde-Kilsch

Final
- Champion: (United States) Martina Navratilova
- Runner-up: (United States) Zina Garrison
- Score: 7–6, 6–3

Details
- Draw: 56
- Seeds: 16

Events
Singles	Doubles
← 1988 ·	Birmingham Classic	· 1990 →

Claudia Kohde-Kilsch was the defending champion but lost in the semifinals to Zina Garrison.

Martina Navratilova won in the final 7–6, 6–3 against Garrison.

== Seeds ==
A champion seed is indicated in bold text while text in italics indicates the round in which that seed was eliminated. The top eight seeds received a bye to the second round.

1. (United States) **Martina Navratilova (Champion)**
2. (United States) Zina Garrison (final)
3. (United States) Pam Shriver (third round)
4. (United States) Lori McNeil (second round)
5. (West Germany) Claudia Kohde-Kilsch (semifinals)
6. (Soviet Union) Larisa Savchenko (third round)
7. (Australia) Anne Minter (third round)
8. (United States) Terry Phelps (second round)
9. (South Africa) Rosalyn Fairbank (third round)
10. n/a
11. (United States) Kathy Rinaldi (third round)
12. (South Africa) Elna Reinach (semifinals)
13. (United Kingdom) Sara Gomer (second round)
14. n/a
15. (United States) Ann Henricksson (quarterfinals)
16. (United Kingdom) Jo Durie (third round)

== Draw ==
=== Key ===
- Q = Qualifier
- WC = Wild card
- LL = Lucky loser
- Alt = Alternate
- SE = Special exempt
- PR = Protected ranking
- ITF = ITF entry
- JE = Junior exempt
- w/o = Walkover
- r = Retired
- d = Defaulted
- SR = Special ranking

=== Finals ===
Semifinals
1	(United States) **Martina Navratilova**	**6**	**6**
12	(South Africa) Elna Reinach	2	2
5	(West Germany) Claudia Kohde-Kilsch	6	2
2	(United States) **Zina Garrison**	**7**	**6**

Final
1	(United States) **Martina Navratilova**	**7**	**6**
2	(United States) Zina Garrison	6	2

=== Top half ===
==== Section 1 ====
First round
(United States) M McGrath	3	1
(Japan) **A Kijimuta**	**6**	**6**
(Netherlands) **C Bakkum**	**7**	**7**
(South Africa) K Schimper	6	6
Q	(United Kingdom) L Gould	1	3
16	(United Kingdom) **J Durie**	**6**	**6**
(United States) **K Adams**	**7**	**6**
(United Kingdom) M Javer	6	4
Q	(Australia) **K Radford**	6	**6**	**6**
Q	(South Africa) R Gaddie	**7**	1	0
LL	(Brazil) **G Miró**	**6**	**6**
(United States) S Stafford	3	3

Second round
1	(United States) **M Navratilova**	**6**	**6**
(Japan) A Kijimuta	0	1
(Netherlands) C Bakkum	1	2
16	(United Kingdom) **J Durie**	**6**	**6**
(United States) K Adams	**6**	2	2
Q	(Australia) **K Radford**	4	**6**	**6**
LL	(Brazil) G Miró	4	4
6	(Soviet Union) **L Savchenko**	**6**	**6**

Third round
1	(United States) **M Navratilova**	**6**	**6**
16	(United Kingdom) J Durie	1	2
Q	(Australia) **K Radford**	**6**	**6**
6	(Soviet Union) L Savchenko	3	1

Quarterfinals
1	(United States) **M Navratilova**	**6**	**6**
Q	(Australia) K Radford	4	2

==== Section 2 ====
First round
(United States) **B Nagelsen**	**6**	**7**
(Australia) E Minter	1	5
Q	(France) **S Amiach**	5	**6**	**6**
(United States) H Ludloff	**7**	2	3
(Japan) K Okamoto	2	2
13	(United Kingdom) **S Gomer**	**6**	**6**
12	(South Africa) **E Reinach**	**6**	**6**
(Australia) M Jaggard	3	3
(United States) K Steinmetz	**7**	2	1
(West Germany) **M Pawlik**	5	**6**	**6**
(South Africa) **A Coetzer**	**6**	**6**
(United Kingdom) J Louis	2	2

Second round
4	(United States) L McNeil	6	4
(United States) **B Nagelsen**	**7**	**6**
Q	(France) **S Amiach**	5	**6**	**6**
13	(United Kingdom) S Gomer	**7**	2	3
12	(South Africa) **E Reinach**	**6**	**6**
(West Germany) M Pawlik	1	0
(South Africa) A Coetzer	3	**6**	2
7	(Australia) **A Minter**	**6**	3	**6**

Third round
(United States) **B Nagelsen**	**6**	**6**
Q	(France) S Amiach	2	3
12	(South Africa) **E Reinach**	**6**	**6**
7	(Australia) A Minter	1	3

Quarterfinals
(United States) B Nagelsen	**6**	3	5
12	(South Africa) **E Reinach**	1	**6**	**7**

=== Bottom half ===
==== Section 3 ====
First round
(United States) K Kessaris	2	3
Q	(Japan) **N Miyagi**	**6**	**6**
(United States) L Antonoplis	**6**	3	1
Q	(United Kingdom) **B Borneo**	1	**6**	**6**
(Japan) A Nishiya	0	3
9	(South Africa) **R Fairbank**	**6**	**6**
15	(United States) **A Henricksson**	**6**	5	**7**
(United States) R Reis	4	**7**	5
(New Zealand) **J Richardson**	1	**6**	**6**
(United Kingdom) A Grunfeld	**6**	3	3
(Italy) **L Golarsa**	**6**	2	**6**
(Australia) E Smylie	1	**6**	4

Second round
5	(West Germany) **C Kohde-Kilsch**	3	**6**	**6**
Q	(Japan) N Miyagi	**6**	4	2
Q	(United Kingdom) B Borneo	0	2
9	(South Africa) **R Fairbank**	**6**	**6**
15	(United States) **A Henricksson**	**6**	4	**6**
(New Zealand) J Richardson	3	**6**	4
(Italy) L Golarsa	**6**	6	4
3	(United States) **P Shriver**	4	**7**	**6**

Third round
5	(West Germany) **C Kohde-Kilsch**	**6**	**6**
9	(South Africa) R Fairbank	0	4
15	(United States) **A Henricksson**	**7**	**7**
3	(United States) P Shriver	6	5

Quarterfinals
5	(West Germany) **C Kohde-Kilsch**	**6**	**6**
15	(United States) A Henricksson	2	4

==== Section 4 ====
First round
Q	(Japan) **K Date**	**6**	**6**
Q	(France) C Suire	2	3
(Australia) **L Field**	**7**	**6**
(United States) D Faber	6	3
(United Kingdom) C Wood	0	1
(Japan) **E Inoue**	**6**	**6**
11	(United States) **K Rinaldi**	3	**6**	**7**
(Japan) M Yanagi	**6**	3	5
(United States) **J Santrock**	**6**	**6**
(United Kingdom) J Salmon	2	3
(United States) **H Na**	4	**6**	**6**
(United States) C Benjamin	**6**	3	4

Second round
8	(United States) T Phelps	0	2
Q	(Japan) **K Date**	**6**	**6**
(Australia) **L Field**	4	**7**	**7**
(Japan) E Inoue	**6**	5	5
11	(United States) **K Rinaldi**	**6**	**6**
(United States) J Santrock	4	2
(United States) H Na	3	4
2	(United States) **Z Garrison**	**6**	**6**

Third round
Q	(Japan) **K Date**	5	**6**	**6**
(Australia) L Field	**7**	4	4
11	(United States) K Rinaldi	1	**7**	1
2	(United States) **Z Garrison**	**6**	5	**6**

Quarterfinals
Q	(Japan) K Date	3	2
2	(United States) **Z Garrison**	**6**	**6**
