= 1990 Dow Classic – Doubles =

Doubles
- 1990 Dow Classic
- 1989 Champions: (Soviet Union) Larisa Savchenko-Neiland (Soviet Union) Natasha Zvereva

Final
- Champions: (Soviet Union) Larisa Savchenko-Neiland (Soviet Union) Natasha Zvereva
- Runners-up: (South Africa) Lise Gregory (United States) Gretchen Magers
- Score: 3–6, 6–3, 6–3

Events
Singles	Doubles
← 1989 ·	Birmingham Classic	· 1991 →

Larisa Savchenko-Neiland and Natasha Zvereva were the two-time defending champions and successfully defended their title by defeating Lise Gregory and Gretchen Magers, 3–6, 6–3, 6–3.

== Seeds ==
Champion seeds are indicated in bold text while text in italics indicates the round in which those seeds were eliminated. The top four seeded teams received byes into the second round.

1. **(Soviet Union) Larisa Savchenko-Neiland / (Soviet Union) Natasha Zvereva (Champions)**
2. (Australia) Nicole Provis / (South Africa) Elna Reinach (quarterfinals)
3. (United States) Mary Joe Fernández / (United States) Betsy Nagelsen (semifinals)
4. (United States) Katrina Adams / (United States) Lori McNeil (quarterfinals)
5. (United States) Patty Fendick / (United States) Zina Garrison-Jackson (quarterfinals)
6. (United States) Meredith McGrath / (United States) Anne Smith (first round)
7. (Soviet Union) Natalia Medvedeva / (Soviet Union) Leila Meskhi (quarterfinals)
8. (South Africa) Lise Gregory / (United States) Gretchen Magers (final)

== Draw ==
=== Key ===
- Q = Qualifier
- WC = Wild card
- LL = Lucky loser
- Alt = Alternate
- SE = Special exempt
- PR = Protected ranking
- ITF = ITF entry
- JE = Junior exempt
- w/o = Walkover
- r = Retired
- d = Defaulted
- SR = Special ranking

=== Finals ===
Semifinals
1	**(Soviet Union) L Savchenko-Neiland** **(Soviet Union) N Zvereva**	**6**	**6**
3	(United States) M-J Fernández (United States) B Nagelsen	4	3
8	**(South Africa) L Gregory** **(United States) G Magers**	**6**	1	**6**
(Australia) J-A Faull (New Zealand) J Richardson	3	**6**	2

Final
1	**(Soviet Union) L Savchenko-Neiland** **(Soviet Union) N Zvereva**	3	**6**	**6**
8	(South Africa) L Gregory (United States) G Magers	**6**	3	3

=== Top half ===
First round
**(France) P Paradis** **(France) C Suire**	**6**	**6**
(United States) A Grousbeck (Japan) N Miyagi	2	3
(United States) L Allen (France) S Amiach	3	**6**	3
**(Australia) J Byrne** **(Australia) J Tremelling**	**6**	1	**6**
(United Kingdom) S Gomer (United Kingdom) J Salmon	4	**6**	5
5	**(United States) P Fendick** **(United States) Z Garrison-Jackson**	**6**	3	**7**
**(South Africa) L Barnard** **(Australia) L Field**	**7**	**6**
(United States) P Barg-Mager (United States) S Stafford	5	4
(United States) S Collins (United States) J Smoller	1	0
**(South Africa) R Fairbank-Nideffer** **(West Germany) C Kohde-Kilsch**	**6**	**6**
(United Kingdom) B Borneo (United Kingdom) C Wood	6	1
7	**(Soviet Union) N Medvedeva** **(Soviet Union) L Meskhi**	**7**	**6**

Second round
1	**(Soviet Union) L Savchenko-Neiland** **(Soviet Union) N Zvereva**	**6**	**7**
(France) P Paradis (France) C Suire	3	5
(Australia) J Byrne (Australia) J Tremelling	1	2
5	**(United States) P Fendick** **(United States) Z Garrison-Jackson**	**6**	**6**
3	**(United States) M J Fernández** **(United States) B Nagelsen**	**6**	**7**
(South Africa) L Barnard (Australia) L Field	3	6
(South Africa) R Fairbank-Nideffer (West Germany) C Kohde-Kilsch	5	3
7	**(Soviet Union) N Medvedeva** **(Soviet Union) L Meskhi**	**7**	**6**

Quarterfinals
1	**(Soviet Union) L Savchenko-Neiland** **(Soviet Union) N Zvereva**	**6**	**6**
5	(United States) P Fendick (United States) Z Garrison-Jackson	4	3
3	**(United States) M J Fernández** **(United States) B Nagelsen**	**6**	**6**
7	(Soviet Union) N Medvedeva (Soviet Union) L Meskhi	4	4

Semifinals
1	**(Soviet Union) L Savchenko-Neiland** **(Soviet Union) N Zvereva**	**6**	**6**
3	(United States) M J Fernández (United States) B Nagelsen	4	3
