= 1985 Edgbaston Cup =

- Date: 10–16 June
- Edition: 4th
- Category: 2
- Draw: 56S / 32D
- Surface: Grass / outdoor
- Location: Birmingham, United Kingdom
- Venue: Edgbaston Priory Club

Champions

Singles
- (United States) Pam Shriver

Doubles
- (United States) Terry Holladay / (United States) Sharon Walsh-Pete
← 1984 ·	Birmingham Classic	· 1986 →

The 1985 Edgbaston Cup was a women's tennis tournament played on outdoor grass courts that was part of the Category 2 tier of the 1985 Virginia Slims World Championship Series. It was the 4th edition of the tournament and took place at the Edgbaston Priory Club in Birmingham, United Kingdom from 10 June until 16 June 1985. Pam Shiver won the singles title.

== Finals ==
=== Singles ===
(United States) Pam Shriver defeated (United States) Betsy Nagelsen 6–1, 6–0

- It was Shriver's third title of the year and the 10th of her career.

=== Doubles ===
(United States) Terry Holladay / (United States) Sharon Walsh-Pete defeated (United States) Elise Burgin / (United States) Alycia Moulton 6–4, 5–7, 6–3

- It was Holladay's first doubles title of the year and of her career. It was Walsh-Pete's second doubles title of the year and the 22nd of her career.

== Entrants ==
=== Seeds ===
Athlete	Nationality	Seeding
Pam Shriver	United States	1
Pam Casale	United States	2
Alycia Moulton	United States	3
Virginia Ruzici	Romania	4
Elise Burgin	United States	5
Dianne Balestrat	Australia	6
Rosalyn Fairbank	South Africa	7
Annabel Croft	Great Britain	8
Camille Benjamin	United States	9
Anne Minter	Australia	10
Sharon Walsh-Pete	United States	11
Robin White	United States	12
Jo Durie	Great Britain	13
Elizabeth Smylie	Australia	14

=== Other entrants ===
The following players received entry from the qualifying draw:

- (France) Marie-Christine Calleja
- (Soviet Union) Svetlana Cherneva
- (United States) Kris Kinney
- (United States) Heather Ludloff
- (United States) Tina Mochizuki
- (South Africa) Jennifer Mundel
- (United States) Kim Sands
- (Japan) Masako Yanagi
