= 1986 Edgbaston Cup =

- Date: 9–15 June
- Edition: 5th
- Draw: 56S / 32D
- Surface: Grass / outdoor
- Location: Birmingham, United Kingdom
- Venue: Edgbaston Priory Club

Champions

Singles
- (United States) Pam Shriver

Doubles
- (United States) Elise Burgin / (South Africa) Rosalyn Fairbank
← 1985 ·	Birmingham Classic	· 1987 →

The 1986 Edgbaston Cup was a women's tennis tournament played on outdoor grass courts that was part of the 1986 Virginia Slims World Championship Series. It was the 5th edition of the event and the last to be named the "Edgbaston Cup" before the tournament's name was changed to "The Dow Chemical Classic". It took place at the Edgbaston Priory Club in Birmingham, United Kingdom, from 9 June until 15 June 1986. First-seeded Pam Shriver won the singles title, her third consecutive at the event.

== Finals ==
=== Singles ===
(United States) Pam Shriver defeated (Bulgaria) Manuela Maleeva 6–2, 7–6^{(7–0)}

- It was Shriver's first title of the year and the 12th of her career.

=== Doubles ===
(United States) Elise Burgin / (South Africa) Rosalyn Fairbank defeated (Australia) Elizabeth Smylie / (Australia) Wendy Turnbull 6–2, 6–4

- It was Burgin's second doubles title of the year and the 4th of her career. It was Fairbank's first doubles title of the year and the 12th of her career.

== Entrants ==
=== Seeds ===
Athlete	Nationality	Seeding
Pam Shriver	United States	1
Manuela Maleeva	Bulgaria	2
Wendy Turnbull	Australia	3
Kathy Jordan	United States	4
Jo Durie	Great Britain	5
Anne White	United States	6
Robin White	United States	7
Kate Gompert	United States	8
Elise Burgin	United States	9
Alycia Moulton	United States	10
Rosalyn Fairbank	South Africa	11
Susan Mascarin	United States	12
Debbie Spence	United States	13
Sylvia Hanika	West Germany	14

=== Other entrants ===
The following players received entry from the qualifying draw:

- (Australia) Jenny Byrne
- (United States) Sandy Collins
- (Brazil) Cláudia Monteiro
- (South Africa) Elna Reinach
- (United Kingdom) Julie Salmon
- (United States) Kim Sands
- (South Africa) Dinky Van Rensburg
- (Japan) Masako Yanagi
