= 1990 Dow Classic – Singles =

Singles
- 1990 Dow Classic
- 1989 Champion: (United States) Martina Navratilova

Final
- Champion: (United States) Zina Garrison
- Runner-up: (Czechoslovakia) Helena Suková
- Score: 6–4, 6–1

Details
- Draw: 56
- Seeds: 16

Events
Singles	Doubles
← 1989 ·	Birmingham Classic	· 1991 →

Martina Navratilova was the defending champion but did not compete at the Dow Classic in 1990.

Zina Garrison won in the final against Helena Suková, 6–4, 6–1.

== Seeds ==
The top eight seeds receive a bye into the second round.

1. (United States) Zina Garrison (Champion)
2. (Czechoslovakia) Helena Suková (final)
3. (South Africa) Rosalyn Fairbank-Nideffer (semifinals)
4. (France) Nathalie Tauziat (semifinals)
5. (United States) Gigi Fernández (quarterfinals)
6. (United States) Gretchen Magers (second round)
7. (United States) Anne Smith (quarterfinals)
8. (Soviet Union) Larisa Savchenko-Neiland (quarterfinals)
9. n/a
10. (Italy) Laura Golarsa (third round)
11. (South Africa) Amanda Coetzer (first round)
12. (United States) Lori McNeil (third round)
13. (Mexico) Angélica Gavaldón (first round)
14. (United States) Betsy Nagelsen (third round)
15. (Japan) Nana Miyagi (first round)
16. (West Germany) Claudia Kohde-Kilsch (third round)

== Draw ==
=== Key ===
- Q = Qualifier
- WC = Wild card
- LL = Lucky loser
- Alt = Alternate
- SE = Special exempt
- PR = Protected ranking
- ITF = ITF entry
- JE = Junior exempt
- w/o = Walkover
- r = Retired
- d = Defaulted
- SR = Special ranking

=== Finals ===
Quarterfinals
1	(United States) Zina Garrison	6	6
(New Zealand) Belinda Cordwell	1	2
4	(France) Nathalie Tauziat	6	6
7	(United States) Anne Smith	1	2
5	(United States) Gigi Fernández	6	2	5
3	(South Africa) Rosalyn Fairbank-Nideffer	4	6	7
8	(Soviet Union) Larisa Savchenko-Neiland	6	3	2
2	(Czechoslovakia) Helena Suková	3	6	6

Semifinals
1	(United States) Zina Garrison	6	3	6
4	(France) Nathalie Tauziat	1	6	0
3	(South Africa) Rosalyn Fairbank-Nideffer	6	4	5
2	(Czechoslovakia) Helena Suková	2	6	7

Final
1	(United States) Zina Garrison	6	6
2	(Czechoslovakia) Helena Suková	4	1

=== Top half ===
==== Section 1 ====
First round
Q	(New Zealand) J Richardson	1	5
Q	(France) C Suire	6	7
(Australia) M Jaggard	2	1
(United States) K Adams	6	6
(Japan) M Kidowaki	6	4	8
11	(South Africa) A Coetzer	4	6	6
15	(Japan) N Miyagi	7	4	1
(New Zealand) B Cordwell	6	6	6
(United Kingdom) S Gomer	6	7
(Argentina) C Tessi	2	5
(United States) A Henricksson	6	7
(Australia) K Godridge	4	6

Second round
1	(United States) Z Garrison	7	6
Q	(France) C Suire	5	2
(United States) K Adams	4	5
(Japan) M Kidowaki	6	7
(New Zealand) B Cordwell	3	6	6
(United Kingdom) S Gomer	6	3	4
(United States) A Henricksson	6	1	8
6	(United States) G Magers	4	6	6

Third round
1	(United States) Z Garrison	6	6	6
(Japan) M Kidowaki	7	2	1
(New Zealand) B Cordwell	6	6
(United States) A Henricksson	4	2

Quarterfinals
1	(United States) Z Garrison	6	6
(New Zealand) B Cordwell	1	2

==== Section 2 ====
First round
Q	(Canada) J Hetherington	6	4	3
Q	(United States) K Jordan	4	6	6
(United States) H Na	6	6
(United States) C Benjamin	1	2
(United States) M McGrath	6	6
13	(Mexico) A Gavaldón	1	4
(Japan) E Inoue	6	6
(United States) A Leand	2	2
(Soviet Union) N Medvedeva	4	5
(Australia) L Field	6	7
(Poland) R Baranski	6	6
(United Kingdom) S Smith	1	0

Second round
4	(France) N Tauziat	5	6	7
Q	(United States) K Jordan	7	3	5
(United States) H Na	6	6
(United States) M McGrath	4	2
(Japan) E Inoue	1	7	6
(Australia) L Field	6	5	4
(Poland) R Baranski	4	1
7	(United States) A Smith	6	6

Third round
4	(France) N Tauziat	7	6
(United States) H Na	5	2
(Japan) E Inoue	1	0
7	(United States) A Smith	6	6

Quarterfinals
4	(France) N Tauziat	6	6
7	(United States) A Smith	1	2

=== Bottom half ===
==== Section 3 ====
First round
(Soviet Union) E Brioukhovets	7	7
(Japan) K Okamoto	5	6
(United States) D Faber	7	6
Q	(Netherlands) C Bakkum	6	3
Q	(United States) H Ludloff	3	3
10	(Italy) L Golarsa	6	6
14	(United States) B Nagelsen	6	6
(France) S Amiach	0	0
(United Kingdom) J Durie	6	2	6
(Australia) J-A Faull	1	6	3
Q	(United Kingdom) J Salmon	7	3	6
(United Kingdom) S Loosemore	6	6	1

Second round
5	(United States) G Fernández	6	6
(Soviet Union) E Brioukhovets	3	2
(United States) D Faber	2	1
10	(Italy) L Golarsa	6	6
14	(United States) B Nagelsen	7	6
(United Kingdom) J Durie	5	2
Q	(United Kingdom) J Salmon	1	3
3	(South Africa) R Fairbank-Nideffer	6	6

Third round
5	(United States) G Fernández	6	6
10	(Italy) L Golarsa	3	3
14	(United States) B Nagelsen	3	3
3	(South Africa) R Fairbank-Nideffer	6	6

Quarterfinals
5	(United States) G Fernández	6	2	5
3	(South Africa) R Fairbank-Nideffer	4	6	7

==== Section 4 ====
First round
(Australia) A Minter	6	6
Q	(Sweden) M Lindström	2	2
(France) P Paradis	2	6	4
(Australia) J Tremelling	6	2	6
(South Africa) E Reinach	6	4
12	(United States) L McNeil	7	6
16	(West Germany) C Kohde-Kilsch	6	6
(United States) S Stafford	4	2
(United States) J Santrock	3	2
(Hong Kong) P Hy	6	6
(United Kingdom) C Wood	6	6	2
(Sweden) C Dahlman	3	7	6

Second round
8	(Soviet Union) L Savchenko-Neiland	6	6
(Australia) A Minter	4	3
(Australia) J Tremelling	6	1	4
12	(United States) L McNeil	1	6	6
16	(West Germany) C Kohde-Kilsch	6	6
(Hong Kong) P Hy	2	1
(Sweden) C Dahlman	3	2
2	(Czechoslovakia) H Suková	6	6

Third round
8	(Soviet Union) L Savchenko-Neiland	6	6	6
12	(United States) L McNeil	7	4	3
16	(West Germany) C Kohde-Kilsch	4	1
2	(Czechoslovakia) H Suková	6	6

Quarterfinals
8	(Soviet Union) L Savchenko-Neiland	6	3	2
2	(Czechoslovakia) H Suková	3	6	6
