= 1985 Edgbaston Cup – Singles =

Singles
- 1985 Edgbaston Cup
- 1984 Champion: (United States) Pam Shriver

Final
- Champion: (United States) Pam Shriver
- Runner-up: (United States) Betsy Nagelsen
- Score: 6–1, 6–0

Details
- Draw: 56
- Seeds: 14

Events
Singles	Doubles
← 1984 ·	Birmingham Classic	· 1986 →

Pam Shriver was the defending champion and won in the final 6–1, 6–0 against Betsy Nagelsen.

== Seeds ==
The top eight seeds receive a bye into the second round.

1. (United States) Pam Shriver (Champion)
2. (United States) Pam Casale (second round)
3. (United States) Alycia Moulton (quarterfinals)
4. (Romania) Virginia Ruzici (second round, retired)
5. (United States) Elise Burgin (semifinals)
6. (Australia) Dianne Balestrat (third round)
7. (South Africa) Rosalyn Fairbank (third round)
8. (United Kingdom) Annabel Croft (second round)
9. (United States) Camille Benjamin (third round)
10. (Australia) Anne Minter (third round)
11. (United States) Sharon Walsh-Pete (first round)
12. (United States) Robin White (quarterfinals)
13. (United Kingdom) Jo Durie (second round)
14. (Australia) Elizabeth Smylie (first round)

== Draw ==
=== Key ===
- Q = Qualifier
- WC = Wild card
- LL = Lucky loser
- Alt = Alternate
- SE = Special exempt
- PR = Protected ranking
- ITF = ITF entry
- JE = Junior exempt
- w/o = Walkover
- r = Retired
- d = Defaulted
- SR = Special ranking

=== Finals ===
Quarterfinals
1	(United States) Pam Shriver	6	6
(United Kingdom) Anne Hobbs	4	0
12	(United States) Robin White	7	4	4
5	(United States) Elise Burgin	6	6	6
(United States) Susan Mascarin	7	6
3	(United States) Alycia Moulton	6	4
(United States) Ann Henricksson	3	3
(United States) Betsy Nagelsen	6	6

Semifinals
1	(United States) Pam Shriver	6	6
5	(United States) Elise Burgin	4	2
(United States) Susan Mascarin	6	5	4
(United States) Betsy Nagelsen	3	7	6

Final
1	(United States) Pam Shriver	6	6
(United States) Betsy Nagelsen	1	0

=== Top half ===
==== Section 1 ====
First round
(Brazil) N Dias	5	2
(Switzerland) C Jolissaint	7	6
(Netherlands) M Mesker	6	7
(Japan) E Inoue	3	5
(South Africa) Y Vermaak	6	2	1
13	(United Kingdom) J Durie	1	6	6
(United Kingdom) A Brown	6	6
(United States) B Herr	3	3
(Soviet Union) E Eliseenko	2	1
(United Kingdom) A Hobbs	6	6
(United States) W White	7	6
Q	(United States) H Ludloff	5	1

Second round
1	(United States) P Shriver	6	6
(Switzerland) C Jolissaint	3	4
(Netherlands) M Mesker	6	7
13	(United Kingdom) J Durie	4	6
(United Kingdom) A Brown	2	0
(United Kingdom) A Hobbs	6	6
(United States) W White	6	3	1
7	(South Africa) R Fairbank	1	6	6

Third round
1	(United States) P Shriver	6	6
(Netherlands) M Mesker	1	3
(United Kingdom) A Hobbs	6	7
7	(South Africa) R Fairbank	3	5

Quarterfinals
1	(United States) P Shriver	6	6
(United Kingdom) A Hobbs	4	0

==== Section 2 ====
First round
(France) C Vanier	6	1
(Switzerland) L Drescher	7	6
(United States) B Gerken	6	6
(United States) L McNeil	3	1
(Soviet Union) L Savchenko	6	1	4
12	(United States) R White	4	6	6
9	(United States) C Benjamin	6	7
Q	(Soviet Union) S Cherneva	3	6
(South Africa) R Uys	3	6	6
(United States) M Brown	6	2	4
(United Kingdom) S Gomer	4	6	3
(Australia) E Minter	6	3	6

Second round
4	(Romania) V Ruzici	1	ret.
(Switzerland) L Drescher	3
(United States) B Gerken	4	4
12	(United States) R White	6	6
9	(United States) C Benjamin	6	6
(South Africa) R Uys	4	4
(Australia) E Minter	3	5
5	(United States) E Burgin	6	7

Third round
(Switzerland) L Drescher	4	0
12	(United States) R White	6	6
9	(United States) C Benjamin	3	7	4
5	(United States) E Burgin	6	6	6

Quarterfinals
12	(United States) R White	7	4	4
5	(United States) E Burgin	6	6	6

=== Bottom half ===
==== Section 3 ====
First round
(Canada) H Kelesi	1	5
(United States) S Mascarin	6	7
Q	(South Africa) J Mundel	2	2
(Czechoslovakia) K Skronská	6	6
(United States) G Kim	2	7	6
10	(United States) A Minter	6	5	8
Q	(France) M-C Calleja	6	3
Q	(United States) T Mochizuki	7	6
Q	(United States) K Kinney	6	6
(Argentina) M Paz	3	4
(United States) S Collins	4	3
(United States) M L Piatek	6	6

Second round
8	(United Kingdom) A Croft	3	5
(United States) S Mascarin	6	7
(Czechoslovakia) K Skronská	6	4	1
10	(United States) A Minter	4	6	6
Q	(United States) T Mochizuki	5	1
Q	(United States) K Kinney	7	6
(United States) M L Piatek	2	1
3	(United States) A Moulton	6	6

Third round
(United States) S Mascarin	6	6
10	(United States) A Minter	2	4
Q	(United States) K Kinney	2	3
3	(United States) A Moulton	6	6

Quarterfinals
(United States) S Mascarin	7	6
3	(United States) A Moulton	6	4

==== Section 4 ====
First round
(United States) G Rush	3	4
(United States) A White	6	6
Q	(United States) K Sands	6	7	2
(United States) A Henricksson	7	6	6
(United States) T Holladay	6	6
14	(Australia) E Smylie	1	3
11	(United States) S Walsh-Pete	6	0	5
(South Africa) B Mould	3	6	7
(France) S Amiach	4	6	0
(United States) K Shaefer	6	3	6
Q	(Japan) M Yanagi	7	0	4
(United States) B Nagelsen	5	6	6

Second round
6	(Australia) D Balestrat	7	6
(United States) A White	5	3
(United States) A Henricksson	6	6
(United States) T Holladay	4	2
(South Africa) B Mould	2	3
(United States) K Shaefer	6	6
(United States) B Nagelsen	6	6
2	(United States) P Casale	2	2

Third round
6	(Australia) D Balestrat	6	4
(United States) A Henricksson	7	6
(United States) K Shaefer	5	3
(United States) B Nagelsen	7	6

Quarterfinals
(United States) A Henricksson	3	3
(United States) B Nagelsen	6	6
