= 1989 Dow Classic – Doubles =

Doubles
- 1989 Dow Classic
- 1988 Champions: (Soviet Union) Larisa Savchenko (Soviet Union) Natasha Zvereva

Final
- Champions: (Soviet Union) Larisa Savchenko (Soviet Union) Natasha Zvereva
- Runners-up: (United States) Meredith McGrath (United States) Pam Shriver
- Score: 7–5, 5–7, 6–0

Events
| Singles | Doubles |
| ← 1988 · | Birmingham Classic | · 1990 → |

Larisa Savchenko and Natasha Zvereva were the defending champions and won in the final 7–5, 5–7, 6–0 against Leila Meskhi and Svetlana Parkhomenko.

== Seeds ==
Champion seeds are indicated in bold text while text in italics indicates the round in which those seeds were eliminated. The top four seeded teams received byes into the second round.

1. (Soviet Union) **Larisa Savchenko** / (Soviet Union) **Natasha Zvereva (champions)**
2. (United States) Betsy Nagelsen / (Australia) Janine Tremelling (second round)
3. (United States) Elise Burgin / (South Africa) Rosalyn Fairbank (quarterfinals)
4. (Netherlands) Manon Bollegraf / (South Africa) Lise Gregory (semifinals)
5. (West Germany) Claudia Kohde-Kilsch / (West Germany) Claudia Porwik (first round)
6. (United States) Penny Barg / (United States) Ronni Reis (second round)
7. (United States) Sandy Collins / (United States) Jill Smoller (quarterfinals)
8. (United States) Camille Benjamin / (United States) Terry Phelps (first round)

== Draw ==
=== Key ===
- Q = Qualifier
- WC = Wild card
- LL = Lucky loser
- Alt = Alternate
- SE = Special exempt
- PR = Protected ranking
- ITF = ITF entry
- JE = Junior exempt
- w/o = Walkover
- r = Retired
- d = Defaulted
- SR = Special ranking

=== Final ===
Final

1
(Soviet Union) **Larisa Savchenko**
(Soviet Union) **Natasha Zvereva**
**7**
5
**6**

- (United States) Meredith McGrath
- (United States) Pam Shriver
5
**7**
0

=== Top half ===
First round

Second round

Quarterfinals

Semifinals

1
- (Soviet Union) **L Savchenko**
- (Soviet Union) **N Zvereva**
**6**
**6**

- (United Kingdom) **S Gomer**
- (United Kingdom) **J Salmon**
**6**
3
**6**

- (United Kingdom) S Gomer
- (United Kingdom) J Salmon
2
0

- (United States) M Norwood
- (United States) J Thomas
4
**6**
3

1
- (Soviet Union) **L Savchenko**
- (Soviet Union) **N Zvereva**
**6**
**6**

- (United Kingdom) B Borneo
- (United Kingdom) C Wood
1
3

- (United Kingdom) A Hobbs
- (France) C Suire
4
3

- (United Kingdom) **A Hobbs**
- (France) **C Suire**
**6**
**6**

- (United Kingdom) **A Hobbs**
- (France) **C Suire**
**6**
**6**

- (Italy) **M Grossi**
- (Brazil) **G Miró**
**6**
**6**

- (Italy) M Grossi
- (Brazil) G Miró
2
2

5
- (West Germany) C Kohde-Kilsch
- (West Germany) C Porwik
3
2

1
- (Soviet Union) **L Savchenko**
- (Soviet Union) **N Zvereva**
**6**
**6**

4
- (Netherlands) M Bollegraf
- (South Africa) L Gregory
2
4

4
- (Netherlands) **M Bollegraf**
- (South Africa) **L Gregory**
**7**
**7**

- (Australia) T Morton
- (Japan) A Nishiya
1
6

- (France) S Amiach
- (United States) K Steinmetz
6
6

- (France) **S Amiach**
- (United States) **K Steinmetz**
**6**
**7**

4
- (Netherlands) **M Bollegraf**
- (South Africa) **L Gregory**
4
**7**
**7**

- (United States) **B J King**
- (United States) **M Navratilova**
**6**
**7**

- (Australia) A Minter
- (New Zealand) J Richardson
**6**
6
5

- (Sweden) M Lindström
- (United States) H Ludloff
4
5

- (United States) B J King
- (United States) M Navratilova
4
**7**
5

- (Australia) **A Minter**
- (New Zealand) **J Richardson**
**6**
**6**

- (Australia) **A Minter**
- (New Zealand) **J Richardson**
**6**
5
**7**

8
- (United States) C Benjamin
- (United States) T Phelps
3
2

=== Bottom half ===
First round

Second round

Quarterfinals

Semifinals

6
- (United States) **P Barg**
- (United States) **R Reis**
**6**
**7**

- (United States) L Antonoplis
- (United States) A Henricksson
3
6

6
- (United States) P Barg
- (United States) R Reis
4
5

- (United States) **M McGrath**
- (United States) **P Shriver**
**6**
4
**6**

- (United States) **M McGrath**
- (United States) **P Shriver**
**6**
**7**

- (Australia) M Jaggard
- (South Africa) E Reinach
3
**6**
3

- (United States) **M McGrath**
- (United States) **P Shriver**
**6**
**6**

- (Hong Kong) **P Hy**
- (Australia) **A Scott**
**7**
4
**6**

3
- (United States) E Burgin
- (South Africa) R Fairbank
0
4

- (Japan) E Inoue
- (Japan) A Kijimuta
5
**6**
1

- (Hong Kong) P Hy
- (Australia) A Scott
6
**6**
4

3
- (United States) **E Burgin**
- (South Africa) **R Fairbank**
**7**
3
**6**

- (United States) **M McGrath**
- (United States) **P Shriver**
**6**
4
**6**

7
- (United States) **S Collins**
- (United States) **J Smoller**
**6**
**6**

- (Netherlands) C Bakkum
- (Italy) L Golarsa
2
**6**
2

- (Canada) M Bernard
- (South Africa) K Schimper
3
3

7
- (United States) **S Collins**
- (United States) **J Smoller**
**6**
**7**

- (United States) H Na
- (United States) S Stafford
4
**6**
4

- (United States) D Faber
- (West Germany) M Pawlik
2
5

- (United States) **D Faber**
- (West Germany) **M Pawlik**
**6**
4
**6**

7
- (United States) S Collins
- (United States) J Smoller
5
5

- (Netherlands) **C Bakkum**
- (Italy) **L Golarsa**
**6**
**6**

- (Netherlands) **C Bakkum**
- (Italy) **L Golarsa**
**7**
**7**

- (Japan) N Miyagi
- (Australia) K Radford
1
3

- (Netherlands) **C Bakkum**
- (Italy) **L Golarsa**
2
**6**
**6**

2
- (United States) B Nagelsen
- (Australia) J Tremelling
**6**
4
4
