= 1988 Dow Chemical Classic =

- Date: 6–12 June
- Edition: 7th
- Category: Category 2
- Draw: 56S / 28D
- Prize money: $150,000
- Surface: Grass / Outdoor
- Location: Birmingham, United Kingdom
- Venue: Edgbaston Priory Club

Champions

Singles
- (West Germany) Claudia Kohde-Kilsch

Doubles
- (Soviet Union) Larisa Savchenko / (Soviet Union) Natasha Zvereva
← 1987 ·	Birmingham Classic	· 1989 →

The 1988 Dow Chemical Classic was a women's tennis tournament played on grass courts at the Edgbaston Priory Club in Birmingham in the United Kingdom and was part of the Category 2 tier of the 1988 WTA Tour. It was the seventh edition of the tournament and was held from 6 June until 12 June 1988. Claudia Kohde-Kilsch won the singles title.

== Finals ==
=== Singles ===
(West Germany) Claudia Kohde-Kilsch defeated (United States) Pam Shriver 6–2, 6–1

- It was Kohde-Kilsch's 1st title of the year and the 29th of her career.

=== Doubles ===
(Soviet Union) Larisa Savchenko / (Soviet Union) Natasha Zvereva defeated (Soviet Union) Leila Meskhi / (Soviet Union) Svetlana Parkhomenko 6–4, 6–1

- It was Savchenko's 1st title of the year and the 9th of her career. It was Zvereva's 1st title of the year and the 1st of her career.
