= 1987 Dow Chemical Classic =

- Date: 8–14 June
- Edition: 6th
- Draw: 56S / 32D
- Prize money: $125,000
- Surface: Grass / outdoor
- Location: Birmingham, United Kingdom
- Venue: Edgbaston Priory Club

Champions

Singles
- (United States) Pam Shriver

Doubles
- Doubles cancelled due to rain.
← 1986 ·	Birmingham Classic	· 1988 →

The 1987 Dow Chemical Classic was a women's tennis tournament played on outdoor grass courts that was part of the 1987 Virginia Slims World Championship Series. It was the 6th edition of the tournament and took place at the Edgbaston Priory Club in Birmingham, United Kingdom, from 8 June until 14 June 1987. The tournament suffered as a result of rain and the doubles tournament was eventually cancelled before completion of the first round matches. First-seeded Pam Shriver won the singles title.

== Finals ==
=== Singles ===
(United States) Pam Shriver defeated (Soviet Union) Larisa Savchenko 4–6, 6–2, 6–2

- It was Shriver's first title of the year and the 14th of her career.

=== Doubles ===
The doubles event was cancelled before completion of the first round matches due to the rain.

== Entrants ==
=== Seeds ===
Athlete	Nationality	Seeding
Pam Shriver	United States	1
Lori McNeil	United States	2
Bettina Bunge	West Germany	3
Catarina Lindqvist	Sweden	4
Elizabeth Smylie	Australia	5
Sylvia Hanika	West Germany	6
Carling Bassett	Canada	7
Larisa Savchenko	Soviet Union	8
Etsuko Inoue	Japan	9
Terry Phelps	United States	10
Rosalyn Fairbank	South Africa	11
Nathalie Tauziat	France	12
Catherine Tanvier	France	13
Jo Durie	Great Britain	14

=== Other entrants ===
The following players received wildcards into the main draw:

- (United Kingdom) Annabel Croft
- (United Kingdom) Sally Reeves
- (United Kingdom) Julie Salmon

The following players received entry from the qualifying draw:

- (New Zealand) Belinda Cordwell
- (Australia) Louise Field
- (Netherlands) Nicole Muns-Jagerman
- (United Kingdom) Valda Lake
- (Australia) Susan Leo
- (Japan) Kumiko Okamoto
- (France) Pascale Paradis
- (South Africa) Karen Schimper

The following player received a lucky loser spot:

- (Sweden) Maria Lindström
