= 1989 Dow Classic =

Women's tennis tournament

- Date: 12–18 June
- Edition: 8th
- Category: Category 2
- Draw: 56S / 28D
- Prize money: $150,000
- Surface: Grass / outdoor
- Location: Birmingham, United Kingdom
- Venue: Edgbaston Priory Club

Champions

Singles
- (United States) Martina Navratilova

Doubles
- (Soviet Union) Larisa Savchenko / (Soviet Union) Natasha Zvereva
← 1988 ·	Birmingham Classic	· 1990 →

The 1989 Dow Classic was a women's tennis tournament played on grass courts at the Edgbaston Priory Club in Birmingham in the United Kingdom that was part of the Category 2 tier of the 1989 WTA Tour. It was the 8th edition of the tournament and was held from 12 June until 18 June 1989. First-seeded Martina Navratilova won the singles title.

== Finals ==
=== Singles ===
(United States) Martina Navratilova defeated (United States) Zina Garrison 7–6^{(7–5)}, 6–3

- It was Navratilova's 3rd singles title of the year and the 141st of her career.

=== Doubles ===
(Soviet Union) Larisa Savchenko / (Soviet Union) Natasha Zvereva defeated (United States) Meredith McGrath / (United States) Pam Shriver 7–5, 5–7, 6–0

- It was Savchenko's 3rd title of the year and the 13th of her career. It was Zvereva's 3rd title of the year and the 5th of her career.
