= Kris Kinney =

American tennis player

- Full name: Kristin Kinney McDonald
- Country (sports): United States
- Born: August 27, 1959 (age 66)
- Prize money: $71,994

Singles
- Highest ranking: No. 117 (January 19, 1987)

Grand Slam singles results
- French Open: 1R (1986)
- Wimbledon: 3R (1986)
- US Open: 1R (1986)

Doubles
- Highest ranking: No. 167 (March 15, 1987)

Grand Slam doubles results
- French Open: 1R (1985, 1986)
- Wimbledon: 2R (1984)

Kristin Kinney McDonald (born August 27, 1959) is an American former professional tennis player.

== Biography ==
Kinney grew up in Connecticut and attended Princeton University before turning professional. In addition to tennis she also excelled at squash while at Princeton, earning All-Ivy selection for both sports.

On the professional tour, Kinney reached a highest singles ranking of 117 in the world. Her best performance on the WTA Tour was a quarter-final appearance at the 1986 Northern California Open held in Berkeley. She made the third round of the 1986 Wimbledon Championships, before running into top seed Martina Navratilova.
