= Julie Salmon =

British tennis player

- Country (sports): Great Britain
- Born: 8 July 1965 (age 60)
- Prize money: US$ 145,997

Singles
- Highest ranking: No. 125 (6 August 1984)

Grand Slam singles results
- Australian Open: 2R (1987)
- Wimbledon: 3R (1984, 1988)

Doubles
- Highest ranking: No. 102 (14 August 1989)

Grand Slam doubles results
- Australian Open: 2R (1991)
- Wimbledon: 2R (1983, 1986)
- US Open: 3R (1988)

Julie Salmon (born 8 July 1965) is a British former international tennis player. She competed in the Fed Cup a number of times, from 1988 to 1993. She was the last British survivor in singles competition at Wimbledon 1988, reaching the third round.
