= 1988 Midland Group Championships – Doubles =

Doubles
- 1988 Midland Group Championships

Final
- Champions: (United States) Lori McNeil (United States) Betsy Nagelsen
- Runners-up: (France) Isabelle Demongeot (France) Nathalie Tauziat
- Score: 7–6, 2–6, 7–6

Details
- Draw: 16
- Seeds: 4

Events
Singles	Doubles
← 1987 ·	Brighton International	· 1989 →

Kathy Jordan and Helena Suková were the defending champions but did not compete that year.

Lori McNeil and Betsy Nagelsen won in the final 7–6, 2–6, 7–6 against Isabelle Demongeot and Nathalie Tauziat.

== Seeds ==
Champion seeds are indicated in bold text while text in italics indicates the round in which those seeds were eliminated.

1. (United States) **Lori McNeil** / (United States) **Betsy Nagelsen (champions)**
2. (France) Isabelle Demongeot / (France) Nathalie Tauziat (final)
3. (United Kingdom) Jo Durie / (United States) Sharon Walsh-Pete (semifinals)
4. (Italy) Sandra Cecchini / (South Africa) Elna Reinach (first round)

== Draw ==
=== Key ===
- Q = Qualifier
- WC = Wild card
- LL = Lucky loser
- Alt = Alternate
- SE = Special exempt
- PR = Protected ranking
- ITF = ITF entry
- JE = Junior exempt
- w/o = Walkover
- r = Retired
- d = Defaulted
- SR = Special ranking

First round
1	(United States) **L McNeil** (United States) **B Nagelsen**	**6**	**6**
(United Kingdom) B Borneo (United Kingdom) S Sullivan	3	4
(Czechoslovakia) **P Langrová** (Czechoslovakia) **J Pospíšilová**	**6**	**6**
(United Kingdom) M Javer (United Kingdom) V Lake	4	4
4	(Italy) S Cecchini (South Africa) E Reinach
(United Kingdom) **K Hand** (Netherlands) **A van Buuren**	**w/o**
(Italy) C Caverzasio (Switzerland) C Cohen	0	3
(Czechoslovakia) **I Budařová** (United Kingdom) **C Wood**	**6**	**6**
(United Kingdom) A Grunfeld (United Kingdom) J Louis	1	3
(New Zealand) **B Cordwell** (Netherlands) **H Witvoet**	**6**	**6**
(United States) A Leand (United Kingdom) S Smith	1	1
3	(United Kingdom) **J Durie** (United States) **S Walsh-Pete**	**6**	**6**
(United Kingdom) **S Gomer** (United Kingdom) **J Salmon**	**6**	**6**
(Italy) L Garrone (Italy) L Golarsa	4	4
(West Germany) S Meier (Austria) H Sprung	0	3
2	(France) **I Demongeot** (France) **N Tauziat**	**6**	**6**

Quarterfinals
1	(United States) **L McNeil** (United States) **B Nagelsen**	**6**	**6**
(Czechoslovakia) P Langrová (Czechoslovakia) J Pospíšilová	2	4
(United Kingdom) K Hand (Netherlands) A van Buuren	1	3
(Czechoslovakia) **I Budařová** (United Kingdom) **C Wood**	**6**	**6**
(New Zealand) B Cordwell (Netherlands) H Witvoet	1	**6**	3
3	(United Kingdom) **J Durie** (United States) **S Walsh-Pete**	**6**	2	**6**
(United Kingdom) S Gomer (United Kingdom) J Salmon	2	4
2	(France) **I Demongeot** (France) **N Tauziat**	**6**	**6**

Semifinals
1	(United States) **L McNeil** (United States) **B Nagelsen**	**6**	**6**
(Czechoslovakia) I Budařová (United Kingdom) C Wood	1	4
3	(United Kingdom) J Durie (United States) S Walsh-Pete	**7**	1	5
2	(France) **I Demongeot** (France) **N Tauziat**	6	**6**	**7**

Final
1	(United States) **Lori McNeil** (United States) **Betsy Nagelsen**	**7**	2	**7**
2	(France) Isabelle Demongeot (France) Nathalie Tauziat	6	**6**	6
