= 1988 Virginia Slims of New Orleans – Doubles =

Doubles
- 1988 Virginia Slims of New Orleans
- 1987 Champions: (United States) Zina Garrison (United States) Lori McNeil

Final
- Champions: (United States) Beth Herr (United States) Candy Reynolds
- Runners-up: (United States) Lori McNeil (United States) Betsy Nagelsen
- Score: 6–4, 6–4

Details
- Draw: 16
- Seeds: 4

Events
Singles	Doubles
← 1987 ·	Virginia Slims of New Orleans

Zina Garrison and Lori McNeil were the defending champions but only McNeil competed that year with Betsy Nagelsen.

McNeil and Nagelsen lost in the final 6–4, 6–4 against Beth Herr and Candy Reynolds.

== Seeds ==
Champion seeds are indicated in bold text while text in italics indicates the round in which those seeds were eliminated.

1. (United States) Gigi Fernández / (United States) Robin White (quarterfinals)
2. (United States) Lori McNeil / (United States) Betsy Nagelsen (final)
3. (United States) Elise Burgin / (South Africa) Rosalyn Fairbank (semifinals)
4. (Australia) Jenny Byrne / (Australia) Janine Tremelling (quarterfinals)

== Draw ==
=== Key ===
- Q = Qualifier
- WC = Wild card
- LL = Lucky loser
- Alt = Alternate
- ITF = ITF entry
- PR = Protected ranking
- SR = Special ranking
- SE = Special exempt
- JE = Junior exempt
- JR = Junior Accelerator Programme entrant
- CO = College Accelerator Programme entrant
- NG = Next Gen Accelerator Program entrant
- w/o = Walkover
- r = Retired
- d = Defaulted

First round
1	(United States) **G Fernández** (United States) **R White**	**6**	**6**
(United States) M L Daniels (United States) P Louie-Harper	4	3
(Sweden) M Lindström (Argentina) M Paz	1	1
(United States) **T Austin** (United States) **S Rehe**	**6**	**6**
4	(Australia) **J Byrne** (Australia) **J Tremelling**	**6**	2	**6**
(United States) A Henricksson (United States) A Smith	4	**6**	1
(South Africa) L Gregory (United States) R Reis	4	5
(United States) **B Herr** (United States) **C Reynolds**	**6**	**7**
(United States) **H Ludloff** (United States) **C MacGregor**	**6**	**7**
(United States) B Bowes (United States) P Smith	2	5
(United States) L Antonoplis (United States) T Collins	2	5
3	(United States) **E Burgin** (South Africa) **R Fairbank**	**6**	**7**
(United States) A Leand (United States) K Rinaldi	1	4
(United States) **L Allen** (Poland) **I Kuczyńska**	**6**	**6**
(United States) G Magers (United States) M Werdel	2	1
2	(United States) **L McNeil** (United States) **B Nagelsen**	**6**	**6**

Quarterfinals
1	(United States) G Fernández (United States) R White	2	**6**	5
(United States) **T Austin** (United States) **S Rehe**	**6**	4	**7**
4	(Australia) J Byrne (Australia) J Tremelling	2	6^{6}
(United States) **B Herr** (United States) **C Reynolds**	**6**	**7^{8}**
(United States) H Ludloff (United States) C MacGregor	3	2
3	(United States) **E Burgin** (South Africa) **R Fairbank**	**6**	**6**
(United States) L Allen (Poland) I Kuczyńska	**7^{7}**	4	1
2	(United States) **L McNeil** (United States) **B Nagelsen**	6^{5}	**6**	**6**

Semifinals
(United States) T Austin (United States) S Rehe	3	2
(United States) **B Herr** (United States) **C Reynolds**	**6**	**6**
3	(United States) E Burgin (South Africa) R Fairbank	2	**6**	4
2	(United States) **L McNeil** (United States) **B Nagelsen**	**6**	4	**6**

Final
(United States) **Beth Herr** (United States) **Candy Reynolds**	**6**	**6**
2	(United States) Lori McNeil (United States) Betsy Nagelsen	4	4
