= 1985 Pretty Polly Classic =

- Date: 21–27 October
- Edition: 8th
- Draw: 32S / 16D
- Prize money: $175,000
- Surface: Carpet / indoor
- Location: Brighton, England
- Venue: Brighton Centre

Champions

Singles
- (United States) Chris Evert-Lloyd

Doubles
- (United States) Lori McNeil / (France) Catherine Suire
← 1984 ·	Brighton International	· 1986 →

The 1985 Pretty Polly Classic was a women's tennis tournament played on indoor carpet court at the Brighton Centre in Brighton, England that was part of the 1985 Virginia Slims World Championship Series. It was the eighth edition of the tournament and was held from 21 October until 27 October 1985. First-seeded Chris Evert-Lloyd won the singles title and earned $32,000 first-prize money.

== Finals ==
=== Singles ===
(United States) Chris Evert-Lloyd defeated (Bulgaria) Manuela Maleeva 7–5, 6–3

- It was Evert-Lloyd's 9th singles title of the year and the 141st of her career.

=== Doubles ===
(United States) Lori McNeil / (France) Catherine Suire defeated (United States) Barbara Potter / (Czechoslovakia) Helena Suková 4–6, 7–6, 6–4
