= 1988 Midland Group Championships – Singles =

Singles
- 1988 Midland Group Championships
- 1987 Champion: (Argentina) Gabriela Sabatini

Final
- Champion: (West Germany) Steffi Graf
- Runner-up: (Bulgaria) Manuela Maleeva
- Score: 6–2, 6–0

Details
- Draw: 32
- Seeds: 8

Events
Singles	Doubles
← 1987 ·	Brighton International	· 1989 →

Gabriela Sabatini was the defending champion but did not compete that year.

Steffi Graf won in the final 6–2, 6–0 against Manuela Maleeva.

== Seeds ==
A champion seed is indicated in bold text while text in italics indicates the round in which that seed was eliminated.

1. (West Germany) **Steffi Graf (champion)**
2. (United States) Pam Shriver (semifinals)
3. (Bulgaria) Manuela Maleeva (final)
4. (West Germany) Claudia Kohde-Kilsch (quarterfinals)
5. (United States) Lori McNeil (semifinals)
6. (West Germany) Sylvia Hanika (quarterfinals)
7. (Italy) Sandra Cecchini (quarterfinals)
8. (France) Nathalie Tauziat (quarterfinals)

== Draw ==
=== Key ===
- Q = Qualifier
- WC = Wild card
- LL = Lucky loser
- Alt = Alternate
- SE = Special exempt
- PR = Protected ranking
- ITF = ITF entry
- JE = Junior exempt
- w/o = Walkover
- r = Retired
- d = Defaulted
- SR = Special ranking

First round
1	(West Germany) **S Graf**	**6**	**6**
(Czechoslovakia) I Budařová	3	2
Q	(Sweden) C Dahlman	**7**	5	4
(Netherlands) **H Witvoet**	6	**7**	**6**
LL	(West Germany) S Auer	4	**6**	4
(United Kingdom) **J Durie**	**6**	4	**6**
(Switzerland) C Cohen	**6**	5	1
8	(France) **N Tauziat**	2	**7**	**6**
4	(West Germany) **C Kohde-Kilsch**	**6**	**6**
(Italy) L Golarsa	1	2
(South Africa) E Reinach	2	0
Q	(United Kingdom) **C Wood**	**6**	**6**
(Czechoslovakia) P Langrová	1	3
(United Kingdom) **S Gomer**	**6**	**6**
(West Germany) S Meier	**6**	0	1
5	(United States) **L McNeil**	4	**6**	**6**
7	(Italy) **S Cecchini**	**6**	**6**
(United Kingdom) J Salmon	1	4
(France) **N Herreman**	**7**	6	**6**
(United Kingdom) A Grunfeld	5	**7**	2
(Italy) C Caverzasio	2	**6**	1
(France) **I Demongeot**	**6**	0	**6**
Q	(Sweden) M Strandlund	4	1
3	(Bulgaria) **M Maleeva**	**6**	**6**
6	(West Germany) **S Hanika**	**6**	**6**
(West Germany) W Probst	1	2
(France) C Tanvier	5	2
Q	(Czechoslovakia) **J Pospíšilová**	**7**	**6**
(New Zealand) B Cordwell	3	**6**	4
(Italy) **L Garrone**	**6**	4	**6**
(United Kingdom) M Javer	4	0
2	(United States) **P Shriver**	**6**	**6**

Second round
1	(West Germany) **S Graf**	**6**	**6**
(Netherlands) H Witvoet	1	1
(United Kingdom) J Durie	3	3
8	(France) **N Tauziat**	**6**	**6**
4	(West Germany) **C Kohde-Kilsch**	**7**	**6**
Q	(United Kingdom) C Wood	5	1
(United Kingdom) S Gomer	4	2
5	(United States) **L McNeil**	**6**	**6**
7	(Italy) **S Cecchini**	**6**	3	**6**
(France) N Herreman	2	**6**	4
(France) I Demongeot	3	1
3	(Bulgaria) **M Maleeva**	**6**	**6**
6	(West Germany) **S Hanika**	**6**	**6**
Q	(Czechoslovakia) J Pospíšilová	3	3
(Italy) L Garrone	0	0
2	(United States) **P Shriver**	**6**	**6**

Quarterfinals
1	(West Germany) **S Graf**	**6**	**6**
8	(France) N Tauziat	3	2
4	(West Germany) C Kohde-Kilsch	2	3
5	(United States) **S Martin**	**6**	**6**
7	(Italy) S Cecchini	3	2
3	(Bulgaria) **M Maleeva**	**6**	**6**
6	(West Germany) S Hanika	5	2
2	(United States) **P Shriver**	**7**	**6**

Semifinals
1	(West Germany) **S Graf**	**6**	5	**6**
5	(United States) L McNeil	2	**7**	4
3	(Bulgaria) **M Maleeva**	**7**	**2**
2	(United States) P Shriver	6	1	r

Final
1	(West Germany) **Steffi Graf**	**6**	**6**
3	(Bulgaria) Manuela Maleeva	2	0
