= 1978 BMW Challenge =

- Date: 16–22 October
- Edition: 1st
- Category: Colgate Series (AA)
- Draw: 32S / 16D
- Prize money: $75,000
- Surface: Carpet / indoor
- Location: Brighton, England
- Venue: Brighton Centre

Champions

Singles
- (Romania) Virginia Ruzici

Doubles
- (Netherlands) Betty Stöve / (United Kingdom) Virginia Wade
Brighton International	· 1979 →

The 1978 BMW Challenge was a women's singles tennis tournament played on indoor carpet courts at the Brighton Centre in Brighton in England. The event was part of the AA (Note: Tournaments with prize money for the women of at least $75,000.) category of the 1978 Colgate Series. It was the inaugural edition of the tournament and was held from 16 October through 22 October 1978. Fifth-seeded Virginia Ruzici won the singles title and earned $14,000 first-prize money.

== Finals ==
=== Singles ===
(Romania) Virginia Ruzici defeated (Netherlands) Betty Stöve 5–7, 6–2, 7–5

- It was Ruzici's 3rd title of the year and the 5th of her career.

=== Doubles ===
(Netherlands) Betty Stöve / (United Kingdom) Virginia Wade defeated (South Africa) Ilana Kloss / (United States) JoAnne Russell 6–0, 7–6

== Prize money ==
Event	W	F	SF	QF	Round of 16	Round of 32
Singles	$14,000	$7,100	$3,500	$1,850	$1,000	$550
