= 1985 Virginia Slims of New Orleans =

- Date: September 23–29
- Edition: 2nd
- Category: 3
- Draw: 32S / 15D
- Prize money: $150,000
- Surface: Carpet / indoor
- Location: New Orleans, Louisiana, U.S.
- Venue: UNO Lakefront Arena

Champions

Singles
- (United States) Chris Evert-Lloyd

Doubles
- (United States) Chris Evert-Lloyd / (Australia) Wendy Turnbull
← 1984 ·	Virginia Slims of New Orleans	· 1986 →

The 1985 Virginia Slims of New Orleans was a women's tennis tournament played on indoor carpet courts at the UNO Lakefront Arena in New Orleans, Louisiana in the United States that was part of the Category 3 tier of the 1985 Virginia Slims World Championship Series. It was the second edition of the tournament and was held from September 23 through September 29, 1985. First-seeded Chris Evert-Lloyd won the singles title.

== Finals ==
=== Singles ===
(United States) Chris Evert-Lloyd defeated (United States) Pam Shriver 6–4, 7–5

- It was Evert-Lloyd's 8th singles title of the year and the 140th of her career.

=== Doubles ===
(United States) Chris Evert-Lloyd / (Australia) Wendy Turnbull defeated (United States) Mary-Lou Piatek / (United States) Anne White 6–1, 6–2
