= 1986 Virginia Slims of New Orleans =

- Date: September 29 – October 5
- Edition: 3rd
- Draw: 32S / 16D
- Prize money: $150,000
- Surface: Carpet / indoor
- Location: New Orleans, Louisiana, U.S.

Champions

Singles
- (United States) Martina Navratilova

Doubles
- (United States) Candy Reynolds / (United States) Anne Smith
← 1985 ·	Virginia Slims of New Orleans	· 1987 →

The 1986 Virginia Slims of New Orleans was a women's tennis tournament played on indoor carpet courts in New Orleans, Louisiana in the United States that was part of the 1986 Virginia Slims World Championship Series. It was the third edition of the tournament and was held from September 29 through October 5, 1986. First-seeded Martina Navratilova won the singles title, her second at the event after 1984, and earned $30,000 first-prize money.

== Finals ==
=== Singles ===
(United States) Martina Navratilova defeated (United States) Pam Shriver 6–1, 4–6, 6–2

- It was Navratilova's 10th singles title of the year and the 121st of her career.

=== Doubles ===
(United States) Candy Reynolds / (United States) Anne Smith defeated (Soviet Union) Svetlana Parkhomenko / (Soviet Union) Larisa Savchenko 6–3, 3–6, 6–3
