= 1988 Virginia Slims of New Orleans – Singles =

Singles
- 1988 Virginia Slims of New Orleans
- 1987 Champion: (United States) Chris Evert

Final
- Champion: (United States) Chris Evert
- Runner-up: (United States) Anne Smith
- Score: 6–4, 6–1

Details
- Draw: 28
- Seeds: 8

Events
Singles	Doubles
- Virginia Slims of New Orleans

The 1988 Virginia Slims of New Orleans was the final edition of the Virginia Slims of New Orleans tennis tournament. First-seeded Chris Evert was the defending champion and won in the final 6–4, 6–1 against Anne Smith.

== Seeds ==
A champion seed is indicated in bold text while text in italics indicates the round in which that seed was eliminated. The top four seeds received a bye to the second round.

1. (United States) **Chris Evert (champion)**
2. (United States) Barbara Potter (quarterfinals)
3. (United States) Lori McNeil (quarterfinals)
4. (United States) Stephanie Rehe (semifinals)
5. (United States) Halle Cioffi (first round)
6. (Sweden) Catarina Lindqvist (second round)
7. (United States) Robin White (quarterfinals)
8. (United States) Gretchen Magers (second round)

== Draw ==
Key

- Q = Qualifier
- WC = Wild card
- LL = Lucky loser
- Alt = Alternate
- ITF = ITF entry
- PR = Protected ranking
- SR = Special ranking
- SE = Special exempt
- JE = Junior exempt
- JR = Junior Accelerator Programme entrant
- CO = College Accelerator Programme entrant
- NG = Next Gen Accelerator Program entrant
- w/o = Walkover
- r = Retired
- d = Defaulted

=== Final ===
Final
1	(United States) **Chris Evert**	**6**	**6**
	(United States) Anne Smith	4	1

=== Section 1 ===
First round
(South Africa) **R Fairbank**	**7**	**6**
(United States) P Louie-Harper	5	1
(United States) **E Burgin**	**6**	**6**
Q	(Poland) R Baranski	4	2
(United States) **S Sloane**	5	**7^{7}**	**6**
5	(United States) H Cioffi	**7**	6^{3}	4
(United States) **K Rinaldi**	**6**	1	**6**
(United States) B Nagelsen	3	**6**	4
(United States) M Torres	3	1
Q	(Australia) **J Byrne**	**6**	**6**
(Poland) I Kuczyńska	2	2
7	(United States) **R White**	**6**	**6**

Second round
1	(United States) **C Evert**	**6**	**6**
(South Africa) R Fairbank	1	3
(United States) E Burgin	**6**	6^{4}	2
(United States) **S Sloane**	2	**7^{7}**	**6**
4	(United States) **S Rehe**	**6**	6^{4}	**6**
(United States) K Rinaldi	4	**7^{7}**	1
Q	(Australia) J Byrne	3	4
7	(United States) **R White**	**6**	**6**

Quarterfinals
1	(United States) **C Evert**	**7**	**6**
(United States) S Sloane	5	4
4	(United States) **S Rehe**	1	**7**	**6**
7	(United States) R White	**6**	5	3

Semifinals
1	(United States) **C Evert**	**6**	**6**
4	(United States) S Rehe	1	1

=== Section 2 ===
First round
8	(United States) **G Magers**	**6**	3	**6**
Q	(United States) L Allen	4	**6**	3
(United States) A Frazier	**6**	4	6^{1}
(Socialist Federal Republic of Yugoslavia) **M Seles**	4	**6**	**7^{7}**
Q	(United States) D Faber	1	2
(United States) **G Fernández**	**6**	**6**
6	(Sweden) **C Lindqvist**	**6**	**6**
(Argentina) M Paz	4	4
(United States) M L Daniels	5	1
(United States) **A Smith**	**7**	**6**
(United States) M Werdel	**6**	4	5
(United States) **A Grossman**	3	**6**	**7**

Second round
8	(United States) G Magers	4	4
(Socialist Federal Republic of Yugoslavia) **M Seles**	**6**	**6**
(United States) G Fernández	1	6
3	(United States) **L McNeil**	**6**	**7**
6	(Sweden) C Lindqvist	**7**	5	1
(United States) **A Smith**	5	**7**	**6**
(United States) A Grossman	3	1
2	(United States) **B Potter**	**6**	**6**

Quarterfinals
(Socialist Federal Republic of Yugoslavia) **M Seles**	**6**	**6**
3	(United States) L McNeil	1	3
(United States) **A Smith**	**6**	**6**
2	(United States) B Potter	4	4

Semifinals
(Socialist Federal Republic of Yugoslavia) M Seles	1	3 def.
(United States) **A Smith**	**6**	**4**
