= 1983 Daihatsu Challenge =

- Date: 17–23 October
- Edition: 6th
- Category: Category 3
- Draw: 32S / 16D
- Prize money: $150,000
- Surface: Carpet (Supreme) / indoor
- Location: Brighton, England
- Venue: Brighton Centre

Champions

Singles
- (United States) Chris Evert-Lloyd

Doubles
- (United States) Chris Evert-Lloyd / (United States) Pam Shriver
← 1982 ·	Brighton International	· 1984 →

The 1983 Daihatsu Challenge was a women's tennis tournament played on indoor carpet courts at the Brighton Centre in Brighton, England that was part of the 1983 Virginia Slims World Championship Series. It was the sixth edition of the tournament and was held from 17 October until 23 October 1983. First-seeded Chris Evert-Lloyd won the singles title and earned $28,000 first-prize money.

== Finals ==
=== Singles ===
(United States) Chris Evert-Lloyd defeated (United Kingdom) Jo Durie 6–1, 6–1

- It was Evert's 5th singles title of the year and the 125th of her career.

=== Doubles ===
(United States) Chris Evert-Lloyd / (United States) Pam Shriver defeated (United Kingdom) Jo Durie / (United States) Ann Kiyomura 7–5, 6–4

- It was Evert's 6th title of the year and the 7th of her career. It was Shriver's 13th title of the year and the 47th of her career.

== Prize money ==
Event	W	F	SF	QF	Round of 16	Round of 32
Singles	$28,000	$18,000	$7,000	$3,350	$1,675	$825
