= 1988 Midland Group Championships =

- Date: 25–30 October
- Edition: 11th
- Category: Category 4
- Draw: 32S / 16D
- Prize money: $250,000
- Surface: Carpet (Supreme) / indoor
- Location: Brighton, England
- Venue: Brighton Centre

Champions

Singles
- (West Germany) Steffi Graf

Doubles
- (United States) Lori McNeil / (United States) Betsy Nagelsen
← 1987 ·	Brighton International	· 1989 →

The 1988 Midland Group Championships was a women's tennis tournament played on indoor carpet court at the Brighton Centre in Brighton, England that was part of the 1988 WTA Tour. It was the 11th edition of the tournament and was held from 25 October until 30 October 1988. First-seeded Steffi Graf won the singles title, her second at the event after 1986, and earned $50,000 first-prize money as well as 300 Virginia Slims ranking points.

== Finals ==
=== Singles ===
(West Germany) Steffi Graf defeated (Bulgaria) Manuela Maleeva 6–2, 6–0

- It was Graf's 11th and last singles title of the year and the 30th of her career.

=== Doubles ===
(United States) Lori McNeil / (United States) Betsy Nagelsen defeated (France) Isabelle Demongeot / (France) Nathalie Tauziat 7–6^{(7–5)}, 2–6, 7–6^{(7–3)}

== Prize money and ranking points ==
Event		W	F	SF	QF	Round of 16	Round of 32
Singles	Prize money	$50,000	$22,500	$11,250	$5,650	$2,850	$1,475
Singles	Points	300	210	135	70	35	18
