= 1987 Virginia Slims of San Diego =

Tennis tournament

- Date: August 3–9
- Edition: 4th
- Category: 1+
- Draw: 56S / 28D
- Prize money: $75,000
- Surface: Hard / outdoor
- Location: San Diego, California, U.S.
- Venue: San Diego Tennis & Racquet Club

Champions

Singles
- (Italy) Raffaella Reggi

Doubles
- (Czechoslovakia) Jana Novotná / (France) Catherine Suire
- Southern California Open

The 1987 Virginia Slims of San Diego was a women's tennis tournament played on outdoor hard courts at the San Diego Tennis & Racquet Club in San Diego, California in the United States and was part of the Category 1+ tier of the 1987 WTA Tour. It was the fourth edition of the tournament and ran from August 3 through August 9, 1987. Third-seeded Raffaella Reggi won the singles title.

== Finals ==
=== Singles ===
(Italy) Raffaella Reggi defeated (Australia) Anne Minter 6–0, 6–4

- It was Reggi's 1st singles title of the year and the 4th of her career.

=== Doubles ===
(Czechoslovakia) Jana Novotná / (France) Catherine Suire defeated (United States) Elise Burgin / (United States) Sharon Walsh-Pete 6–3, 6–4
