= 1983 Australian Open – Women's singles =

Women's singles
- 1983 Australian Open

Final
- Champion: (United States) Martina Navratilova
- Runner-up: (United States) Kathy Jordan
- Score: 6–2, 7–6^{(7–5)}

Details
- Draw: 64 (8 Q )
- Seeds: 16

Events
| Singles | men | women | | boys | girls |
| Doubles | men | women | mixed | boys | girls |
| WC Singles | men | women | quad |
| WC Doubles | men | women | quad |
| Legends | men | women | mixed |
- Australian Open

Martina Navratilova defeated Kathy Jordan in the final, 6–2, 7–6^{(7–5)} to win the women's singles tennis title at the 1983 Australian Open. It was her second Australian Open singles title and eighth major singles title overall. With the win, she improved her season record to 86 wins and 1 loss.

Chris Evert was the reigning champion but withdrew before the tournament due to a foot injury.

This tournament was the first Australian Open in which future four-time champion Steffi Graf appeared in the main draw. It also marked the last major appearance of Billie Jean King.

== Prize money ==
The total prize money for the women's singles event was $342,000.

| Event | W | F | SF | QF | Round of 16 | Round of 32 | Round of 64 |
| Singles | $75,000 | $38,000 | $20,500 | $11,000 | $6,000 | $3,000 | $1,500 |

== Seeds ==
The seeded players are listed below. Martina Navratilova is the champion; others show the round in which they were eliminated.

1. (United States) Martina Navratilova (champion)
2. (West Germany) Sylvia Hanika (quarterfinals)
3. (United States) Pam Shriver (semifinals)
4. (Australia) Wendy Turnbull (quarterfinals)
5. (Czechoslovakia) Hana Mandlíková (second round)
6. (United States) Zina Garrison (semifinals)
7. (United States) Billie Jean King (second round)
8. (United Kingdom) Jo Durie (quarterfinals)
9. (United States) Kathy Jordan (finalist)
10. (United States) Kathy Rinaldi (first round)
11. (West Germany) Eva Pfaff (third round)
12. (Canada) Carling Bassett (quarterfinals)
13. (West Germany) Claudia Kohde-Kilsch (third round)
14. (United States) Barbara Potter (third round)
15. (Czechoslovakia) Helena Suková (third round)
16. (South Africa) Rosalyn Fairbank (third round)

== Draw ==
=== Key ===
- Q = Qualifier
- WC = Wild card
- LL = Lucky loser
- r = Retired

=== Finals ===
Quarterfinals
1 | (United States) Martina Navratilova | 4 | 6 | 6
8 | (United Kingdom) Jo Durie | 6 | 3 | 4
3 | (United States) Pam Shriver | 6 | 6
12 | (Canada) Carling Bassett | 0 | 1
6 | (United States) Zina Garrison | 6 | 7
4 | (Australia) Wendy Turnbull | 2 | 6
9 | (United States) Kathy Jordan | 7 | 7
2 | (West Germany) Sylvia Hanika | 6 | 5

Semifinals
1 | (United States) Martina Navratilova | 6 | 6
3 | (United States) Pam Shriver | 4 | 3
6 | (United States) Zina Garrison | 6 | 1
9 | (United States) Kathy Jordan | 7 | 6

Finals
1 | (United States) Martina Navratilova | 6 | 7
9 | (United States) Kathy Jordan | 2 | 6

=== Earlier rounds ===
==== Section 1 ====
First round
1 | (United States) M Navratilova | 6 | 7
(United States) H Ludloff | 0 | 5
(Australia) E Sayers | 6
(West Germany) S Graf | 1 | r
(France) C Suire | 6 | 6 | 6
Q | (United States) R White | 7 | 3 | 3
(Netherlands) M Mesker | 5 | 2
16 | (South Africa) R Fairbank | 7 | 6
8 | (United Kingdom) J Durie | 6 | 7
(United States) S Acker | 3 | 6
Q | (United States) G Fernández | 5 | 6 | 6
(United States) P Smith | 7 | 3 | 2
(United States) A Moulton | 6 | 7
Q | (United Kingdom) A Brown | 1 | 6
(South Africa) J Mundel | 2 | 6 | 6
10 | (United States) K Rinaldi | 6 | 4 | 3

Second round
1 | (United States) M Navratilova | 6 | 6
(Australia) E Sayers | 1 | 0
(France) C Suire | 2 | 2
16 | (South Africa) R Fairbank | 6 | 6
8 | (United Kingdom) J Durie | 6 | 6
Q | (United States) G Fernández | 2 | 2
(United States) A Moulton | 7 | 1 | 8
(South Africa) J Mundel | 5 | 6 | 6

Third round
1 | (United States) M Navratilova | 6 | 6
16 | (South Africa) R Fairbank | 2 | 2
8 | (United Kingdom) J Durie | 6 | 7
(United States) A Moulton | 1 | 6

Quarterfinals
1 | (United States) M Navratilova | 4 | 6 | 6
8 | (United Kingdom) J Durie | 6 | 3 | 4

==== Section 2 ====
First round
3 | (United States) P Shriver | 6 | 6
(United States) A-M Fernandez | 1 | 4
(France) P Paradis | 6 | 6
(Australia) P Whytcross | 3 | 2
(United Kingdom) A Hobbs | 7 | 3 | 6
Q | (Australia) B Randall | 6 | 6 | 3
(Italy) R Reggi | 0 | 4
14 | (United States) B Potter | 6 | 6
12 | (Canada) C Bassett | 6 | 6
(United States) A Kiyomura | 4 | 3
(Australia) A Minter | 6 | 4 | 6
(Japan) E Inoue | 3 | 6 | 2
(United States) S Walsh | 6 | 6
Q | (Australia) A Dingwall | 3 | 2
(United States) B Jordan | 2 | 0
5 | (Czechoslovakia) H Mandlíková | 6 | 6

Second round
3 | (United States) P Shriver | 6 | 6
(France) P Paradis | 3 | 2
(United Kingdom) A Hobbs | 5 | 6 | 4
14 | (United States) B Potter | 7 | 4 | 6
12 | (Canada) C Bassett | 6 | 2 | 7
(Australia) A Minter | 1 | 6 | 5
(United States) S Walsh | 6 | 1
5 | (Czechoslovakia) H Mandlíková | 2 | 0 | r

Third round
3 | (United States) P Shriver | 3 | 6 | 6
14 | (United States) B Potter | 6 | 3 | 4
12 | (Canada) C Bassett | 7 | 6
(United States) S Walsh | 6 | 4

Quarterfinals
3 | (United States) P Shriver | 6 | 6
12 | (Canada) C Bassett | 0 | 1

==== Section 3 ====
First round
6 | (United States) Z Garrison | 7 | 6
(South Africa) Y Vermaak | 6 | 3
(United States) C Benjamin | 3 | 6 | 6
(United States) L Antonoplis | 6 | 4 | 1
(United States) A White | 6 | 6
Q | (France) S Amiach | 3 | 4
(Brazil) C Monteiro | 1 | 3
11 | (West Germany) E Pfaff | 6 | 6
13 | (West Germany) C Kohde-Kilsch | 6 | 6
(Australia) K Staunton | 3 | 1
Q | (United States) L McNeil | 3 | 7 | 6
(United States) B Herr | 6 | 5 | 1
(United States) L Forood | 6 | 7
(Australia) E Minter | 3 | 5
(Czechoslovakia) M Skuherská | 1 | 2
5 | (Australia) W Turnbull | 6 | 6

Second round
6 | (United States) Z Garrison | 6 | 6
(United States) C Benjamin | 0 | 2
(United States) A White | 5 | 4
11 | (West Germany) E Pfaff | 7 | 6
13 | (West Germany) C Kohde-Kilsch | 7 | 3 | 6
Q | (United States) L McNeil | 6 | 6 | 4
(United States) L Forood | 2 | 2
4 | (Australia) W Turnbull | 6 | 6

Third round
6 | (United States) Z Garrison | 7 | 6
11 | (West Germany) E Pfaff | 6 | 4
13 | (West Germany) C Kohde-Kilsch | 6 | 4
4 | (Australia) W Turnbull | 7 | 6

Quarterfinals
6 | (United States) Z Garrison | 6 | 7
4 | (Australia) W Turnbull | 2 | 6

==== Section 4 ====
First round
9 | (United States) K Jordan | 6 | 6
(Switzerland) L Drescher | 1 | 2
(United Kingdom) V Wade | 7 | 7
(Australia) S Leo | 6 | 5
(France) C Tanvier | 6 | 6
(France) M-C Calleja | 1 | 3
Q | (United States) L Bernstein | 2 | 2
7 | (United States) B J King | 6 | 6
15 | (Czechoslovakia) H Suková | 6 | 6
(United States) K Shaefer | 4 | 1
(United States) B Nagelsen | 6 | 6
(Czechoslovakia) I Budařová | 4 | 4
(France) C Vanier | 6 | 6
(United States) S Solomon | 0 | 2
(United States) B Norton | 1 | 3
2 | (West Germany) S Hanika | 6 | 6

Second round
9 | (United States) K Jordan | 6 | 4 | 6
(United Kingdom) V Wade | 4 | 6 | 1
(France) C Tanvier | 7 | 4 | 6
7 | (United States) B J King | 6 | 6 | 4
15 | (Czechoslovakia) H Suková | 6 | 6
(United States) B Nagelsen | 3 | 3
(France) C Vanier | 2 | 1
2 | (West Germany) S Hanika | 6 | 6

Third round
9 | (United States) K Jordan | 6 | 4 | 7
(France) C Tanvier | 1 | 6 | 5
15 | (Czechoslovakia) H Suková | 2 | 4
2 | (West Germany) S Hanika | 6 | 6

Quarterfinals
9 | (United States) K Jordan | 7 | 7
2 | (West Germany) S Hanika | 6 | 5

| Preceded by 1983 US Open – Women's singles | Grand Slam women's singles | Succeeded by 1984 French Open – Women's singles |
