= 1979 Daihatsu Challenge =

- Date: 20–25 November
- Edition: 2nd
- Category: Colgate Series (AAA)
- Draw: 32S / 16D
- Prize money: $100,000
- Surface: Carpet / indoor
- Location: Brighton, England
- Venue: Brighton Centre

Champions

Singles
- (United States) Martina Navratilova

Doubles
- (United States) Ann Kiyomura / (United States) Anne Smith
← 1978 ·	Brighton International	· 1980 →

The 1979 Daihatsu Challenge was a women's singles tennis tournament played on indoor carpet courts at the Brighton Centre in Brighton in England. The event was part of the AAA (Note: Tournaments with prize money for the women of at least $100,000.) category of the 1979 Colgate Series. It was the second edition of the tournament and was held from 20 November through 25 November 1979. First-seeded Martina Navratilova won the singles title and earned $20,000 first-prize money.

== Finals ==
=== Singles ===
(United States) Martina Navratilova defeated (United States) Chris Evert 6–3, 6–3

- It was Navratilova's 10th singles title of the year and the 34th of her career.

=== Doubles ===
(United States) Ann Kiyomura / (United States) Anne Smith defeated (South Africa) Ilana Kloss / (United States) Laura duPont 6–2, 6–1

== Prize money ==
Event	W	F	SF	QF	Round of 16	Round of 32
Singles	$20,000	$10,000	$4,500	$2,100	$1,100	$550
