= 1982 Daihatsu Challenge =

- Date: 25–31 October
- Edition: 5th
- Category: Toyota Series (Cat. 5)
- Draw: 32S / 16D
- Prize money: $150,000
- Surface: Carpet (Supreme) / indoor
- Location: Brighton, England
- Venue: Brighton Centre

Champions

Singles
- (United States) Martina Navratilova

Doubles
- (United States) Martina Navratilova / (United States) Pam Shriver
← 1981 ·	Brighton International	· 1983 →

The 1982 Daihatsu Challenge was a women's singles tennis tournament played on indoor carpet courts at the Brighton Centre in Brighton in England. The event was part of the Category 5 (Note: Tournaments with prize money for the women of at least $150,000.) tier of the 1982 Toyota Series. It was the fifth edition of the tournament and was held from 25 October through 31 October 1982. First-seeded Martina Navratilova won the singles title, her second at the event after 1979, and earned $28,000 first-prize money.

== Finals ==
=== Singles ===
(United States) Martina Navratilova defeated (United States) Chris Evert-Lloyd 6–1, 6–4

- It was Navratilova's 13th singles title of the year and the 68th of her career.

=== Doubles ===
(United States) Martina Navratilova / (United States) Pam Shriver defeated (United States) Barbara Potter / (United States) Sharon Walsh 2–6, 7–5, 6–4

== Prize money ==
Event	W	F	SF	QF	Round of 16	Round of 32
Singles	$28,000	$14,000	$7,000	$3,350	$1,675	$825
