= 2026 Singapore Tennis Open – Doubles =

Doubles
- 2026 Singapore Tennis Open

Final
- Champions: (New Zealand) Erin Routliffe (Indonesia) Aldila Sutjiadi
- Runners-up: (China) Tang Qianhui (China) Xu Yifan
- Score: 6–3, 6–2
- Date: 27 September 2026

Details
- Draw: 32
- Seeds: 4

Events
Singles	Doubles
- WTA Singapore Open

Erin Routliffe and Aldila Sutjiadi defeated Tang Qianhui and Xu Yifan in the final, 6–3, 6–2 to win the doubles tennis title at the 2026 Singapore Tennis Open.

Desirae Krawczyk and Giuliana Olmos were the reigning champions, but chose not to compete together this year. Krawczyk partnered Storm Hunter, but lost in the quarterfinals to Tang and Xu. Olmos partnered Ingrid Neel, but lost in the first round to Kristina Mladenovic and Alexandra Panova.

== Seeds ==
1. (Australia) Storm Hunter / (United States) Desirae Krawczyk (quarterfinals)
2. (Slovakia) Tereza Mihalíková / (United Kingdom) Olivia Nicholls (first round)
3. (Japan) Miyu Kato / (Australia) Ellen Perez (semifinals)
4. (France) Kristina Mladenovic / Alexandra Panova (quarterfinals)

== Draw ==
Key

- Q = Qualifier
- WC = Wild card
- LL = Lucky loser
- Alt = Alternate
- ITF = ITF entry
- PR = Protected ranking
- SR = Special ranking
- SE = Special exempt
- JE = Junior exempt
- JR = Junior Accelerator Programme entrant
- CO = College Accelerator Programme entrant
- NG = Next Gen Accelerator Program entrant
- w/o = Walkover
- r = Retired
- d = Defaulted

First round
1	(Australia) S Hunter (United States) D Krawczyk	7^{7}	7^{7}
(Japan) M Ninomiya (Slovenia) N Radišić	6^{3}	6^{4}
(France) F Ferro (Czech Republic) L Fruhvirtová	4	2
(China) Q Tang (China) Y Xu	6	6
3	(Japan) M Kato (Australia) E Perez	7	6
(Greece) M Sakkari (Croatia) D Vekić	5	1
(Norway) U Eikeri (United States) Q Gleason	3	6	[5]
S Lansere; T Prozorova	6	2	[10]
(France) E Cascino (China) S Feng	6^{3}	1
(Belgium) S Costoulas (Australia) T Gibson	7^{7}	6
(Estonia) I Neel (Mexico) G Olmos	4	6	[8]
4	(France) K Mladenovic; A Panova	6	4	[10]
Alt	(Germany) A-L Friedsam; A Sasnovich	7	0	[6]
(New Zealand) E Routliffe (Indonesia) A Sutjiadi	5	6	[10]
(Chinese Taipei) J Garland (Chinese Taipei) S-w Hsieh	6	7^{7}
2	(Slovakia) T Mihalíková (United Kingdom) O Nicholls	2	6^{5}

Quarterfinals
1	(Australia) S Hunter (United States) D Krawczyk	3	1
(China) Q Tang (China) Y Xu	6	6
3	(Japan) M Kato (Australia) E Perez	7	5
S Lansere; T Prozorova	5	2^{r}
(Belgium) S Costoulas (Australia) T Gibson	6	7^{7}
4	(France) K Mladenovic; A Panova	3	6^{4}
(New Zealand) E Routliffe (Indonesia) A Sutjiadi	4	0
(Chinese Taipei) J Garland (Chinese Taipei) S-w Hsieh	6	0^{r}

Semifinals
(China) Q Tang (China) Y Xu	6	3	[10]
3	(Japan) M Kato (Australia) E Perez	0	6	[6]
(Belgium) S Costoulas (Australia) T Gibson	6^{4}	3
(New Zealand) E Routliffe (Indonesia) A Sutjiadi	7^{7}	6

Final
(China) Q Tang (China) Y Xu	3	2
(New Zealand) E Routliffe (Indonesia) A Sutjiadi	6	6
