= 2026 Singapore Tennis Open =

- Date: 21–27 September
- Edition: 2nd
- Category: WTA 500
- Draw: 28S / 16Q / 16D
- Prize money: $1,206,446
- Surface: Hard (Indoor)
- Location: Singapore
- Venue: OCBC Arena

Champions

Singles
- (Canada) Leylah Fernandez

Doubles
- (New Zealand) Erin Routliffe / (Indonesia) Aldila Sutjiadi
- WTA Singapore Open

The 2026 Singapore Tennis Open presented by BNP Paribas was a WTA tournament played on hardcourts as part of the 2026 WTA Tour. It was the second edition of the event and took place at the OCBC Arena in Singapore from 21 September through 27 September 2026. The tournament was upgraded to WTA 500 status and moved from February to September this year.

== Champions ==
=== Singles ===
- (Canada) Leylah Fernandez def. (Australia) Talia Gibson, 7–5, 6–0

=== Doubles ===
- (New Zealand) Erin Routliffe / (Indonesia) Aldila Sutjiadi def. (China) Tang Qianhui / (China) Xu Yifan, 6–3, 6–2

== Singles main draw entrants ==
=== Seeds ===
Country	Player	Rank^{1}	Seed
	Mirra Andreeva	5	1
~~USA~~	~~Amanda Anisimova~~	~~11~~	~~2~~
PHI	Alexandra Eala	18	3
BEL	Elise Mertens	19	4
POL	Maja Chwalińska	26	5
CAN	Leylah Fernandez	31	6
GRE	Maria Sakkari	33	7
CRO	Donna Vekić	37	8

- Rankings are as of 14 September 2026.

=== Other entrants ===
The following players received wildcards into the singles main draw:

- (Canada) Leylah Fernandez
- (France) Fiona Ferro
- (Australia) Storm Hunter
- (Slovakia) Rebecca Šramková

The following player received an entry using a protected ranking into the singles main draw:

- (France) Kristina Mladenovic

The following players received entry from the qualifying draw:

- (Germany) Anna-Lena Friedsam
- (Chinese Taipei) Joanna Garland
- (Japan) Nao Hibino
- (Japan) Kyōka Okamura

The following players received entry as lucky losers:

- (Slovakia) Viktória Morvayová
- (Japan) Mei Yamaguchi

=== Withdrawals ===
- Ekaterina Alexandrova → replaced by (Belgium) Sofia Costoulas
- (United States) Amanda Anisimova → replaced by (Slovakia) Viktória Morvayová (LL)
- (Czech Republic) Sára Bejlek → replaced by Tatiana Prozorova
- (Romania) Sorana Cîrstea → replaced by (United States) Alycia Parks
- (United States) Ann Li → replaced by Aliaksandra Sasnovich
- (United States) Jessica Pegula → replaced by (France) Kristina Mladenovic
- (Austria) Anastasia Potapova → replaced by (Czech Republic) Linda Fruhvirtová
- Diana Shnaider → replaced by (Australia) Talia Gibson
- (Denmark) Clara Tauson → replaced by (Australia) Daria Kasatkina
- (Indonesia) Janice Tjen → replaced by (Japan) Mei Yamaguchi (LL)

== Doubles main draw entrants ==
=== Seeds ===
Country	Player	Country	Player	Rank^{†}	Seed
AUS	Storm Hunter	USA	Desirae Krawczyk	49	1
SVK	Tereza Mihalíková	GBR	Olivia Nicholls	54	2
JPN	Miyu Kato	AUS	Ellen Perez	55	3
FRA	Kristina Mladenovic		Alexandra Panova	57	4

- ^{1} Rankings as of 14 September 2026.

=== Withdrawals ===
- (Poland) Maja Chwalińska / (Czech Republic) Barbora Krejčíková → replaced by (Germany) Anna-Lena Friedsam / Aliaksandra Sasnovich
