= 1986 European Indoors =

- Date: 6–12 October
- Edition: 3rd
- Category: Category 3
- Draw: 32S / 16D
- Prize money: $150,000
- Surface: Carpet / indoor
- Location: Zürich, Switzerland
- Venue: Saalsporthalle Allmend

Champions

Singles
- (West Germany) Steffi Graf

Doubles
- (West Germany) Steffi Graf (Argentina) Gabriela Sabatini
- Zurich Open

The 1986 European Indoor Championships was a women's tennis tournament played on indoor carpet courts at the Saalsporthalle Allmend in Zürich in Switzerland and was part of the Category 3 tier of the 1986 WTA Tour. It was the third edition of the tournament and was held from 6 October until 12 October 1986. First-seeded Steffi Graf won the singles title.

== Finals ==
=== Singles ===
(West Germany) Steffi Graf defeated (Czechoslovakia) Helena Suková 4–6, 6–2, 6–4

- It was Graf's 7th singles title of the year and of her career.

=== Doubles ===
(West Germany) Steffi Graf / (Argentina) Gabriela Sabatini defeated (United States) Lori McNeil / (United States) Alycia Moulton 1–6, 6–4, 6–4
