= 1987 Virginia Slims of San Diego – Singles =

Singles
- 1987 Virginia Slims of San Diego

Final
- Champion: (Italy) Raffaella Reggi
- Runner-up: (Australia) Anne Minter
- Score: 6–0, 6–4

Details
- Draw: 56
- Seeds: 14

Events
Singles	Doubles
- Southern California Open

Melissa Gurney was the defending champion, but lost in the second round to Elly Hakami.

Raffaella Reggi won the title by defeating Anne Minter 6–0, 6–4 in the final.

== Seeds ==
The first eight seeds received a bye into the second round.

1. (United States) Lori McNeil (semifinals)
2. (United States) Kate Gompert (quarterfinals)
3. (Italy) Raffaella Reggi (champion)
4. (South Africa) Rosalyn Fairbank (second round)
5. (United States) Melissa Gurney (second round)
6. (United States) Robin White (second round)
7. (United States) Terry Phelps (third round)
8. (France) Nathalie Tauziat (semifinals)
9. (United States) Wendy White (second round)
10. (United States) Alycia Moulton (first round)
11. (West Germany) Eva Pfaff (first round)
12. (United States) Marianne Werdel (first round)
13. (United States) Kathleen Horvath (third round)
14. (United States) Michelle Torres (first round)

== Draw ==
Key

- Q = Qualifier
- WC = Wild card
- LL = Lucky loser
- Alt = Alternate
- ITF = ITF entry
- PR = Protected ranking
- SR = Special ranking
- SE = Special exempt
- JE = Junior exempt
- JR = Junior Accelerator Programme entrant
- CO = College Accelerator Programme entrant
- NG = Next Gen Accelerator Program entrant
- w/o = Walkover
- r = Retired
- d = Defaulted

=== Finals ===
Quarterfinals
1	(United States) Lori McNeil	6	7
(United States) Elly Hakami	3	6
(France) Nathalie Herreman	2	4
(Australia) Anne Minter	6	6
(France) Isabelle Demongeot	6	3	4
3	(Italy) Raffaella Reggi	4	6	6
8	(France) Nathalie Tauziat	6	2	6
2	(United States) Kate Gompert	3	6	4

Semifinals
1	(United States) Lori McNeil	6	4	5
(Australia) Anne Minter	2	6	7
3	(Italy) Raffaella Reggi	6	6
8	(France) Nathalie Tauziat	4	3

Final
(Australia) Anne Minter	0	4
3	(Italy) Raffaella Reggi	6	6

=== Top half ===
==== Section 1 ====
First round
(United States) D Spence	3	1
(Socialist Federal Republic of Yugoslavia) S Goleš	6	6
(France) P Paradis	1	5
(United States) P Louie Harper	6	7
(United States) G Kim	6	6
10	(United States) A Moulton	2	2
12	(United States) M Werdel	3	7	2
(United States) B Nagelsen	6	5	6
(United States) P Fendick	6	6
(United States) R Reis	1	3
(United States) E Hakami	6	6
(Japan) A Kijimuta	2	3

Second round
1	(United States) L McNeil	6	6
(Socialist Federal Republic of Yugoslavia) S Goleš	4	3
(United States) P Louie Harper	5	6	6
(United States) G Kim	7	0	4
(United States) B Nagelsen	6	7
(United States) P Fendick	2	6
(United States) E Hakami	3	6	6
5	(United States) M Gurney	6	3	3

Third round
1	(United States) L McNeil	5	6	6
(United States) P Louie Harper	7	3	1
(United States) B Nagelsen	5	4
(United States) E Hakami	7	6

Quarterfinals
1	(United States) L McNeil	6	7
(United States) E Hakami	3	6

==== Section 2 ====
First round
(France) N Herreman	6	6
(United States) P Smith	0	3
(United States) H Ludloff	3	1
(Argentina) A Villagrán	6	6
(Australia) E Minter	4	7	2
(Sweden) M Lindström	6	5	6
(Czechoslovakia) J Novotná	6	6
(United States) Wendy Ouwendijk	1	3
(United States) Linda Allred	2	1
(Australia) A Minter	6	6
(Argentina) M Pérez Roldán	4	6	7
(France) C Suire	6	3	5

Second round
4	(South Africa) R Fairbank	6	3
(France) N Herreman	7	6
(Argentina) A Villagrán	4	2
(Sweden) M Lindström	6	6
(Czechoslovakia) J Novotná	7	4	2
(Australia) A Minter	6	6	6
(Argentina) M Pérez Roldán	2	3
7	(United States) T Phelps	6	6

Third round
(France) N Herreman	6	7
(Sweden) M Lindström	4	6
(Australia) A Minter	7	6
7	(United States) T Phelps	5	3

Quarterfinals
(France) N Herreman	2	4
(Australia) A Minter	6	6

=== Bottom half ===
==== Section 3 ====
First round
(United States) B Gerken	4	2
(France) I Demongeot	6	6
(Argentina) P Tarabini	6	6	6
(United States) V Nelson-Dunbar	7	2	3
(United States) B Bowes	6	5	2
9	(United States) W White	4	7	6
11	(West Germany) E Pfaff	4	6	6
(Sweden) C Karlsson	6	4	7
(Brazil) N Dias	4	3
(Italy) L Garrone	6	6
(United States) S Walsh-Pete	5	6	6
(United Kingdom) A Croft	7	4	1

Second round
6	(United States) R White	6	4	1
(France) I Demongeot	4	6	6
(Argentina) P Tarabini	6	3	6
9	(United States) W White	4	6	4
(Sweden) C Karlsson	2	7	5
(Italy) L Garrone	6	6	7
(United States) S Walsh-Pete	2	3
3	(Italy) R Reggi	6	6

Third round
(France) I Demongeot	7	6
(Argentina) P Tarabini	5	0
(Italy) L Garrone	0	0
3	(Italy) R Reggi	6	6

Quarterfinals
(France) I Demongeot	6	3	4
3	(Italy) R Reggi	4	6	6

==== Section 4 ====
First round
(United States) T Mochizuki	2	4
(United States) E Burgin	6	6
(United States) S Sloane	7	5	4
(United States) Ca MacGregor	5	7	6
13	(United States) K Horvath	6	6
14	(United States) M Torres	2	2
(United Kingdom) S Gomer	7	6
(South Africa) L Gregory	6	4
(United States) K Keil	6	6	6
(Japan) E Okagawa	2	7	7
(United States) C Benjamin	3	6	6
(South Africa) D Van Rensburg	6	0	4

Second round
8	(France) N Tauziat	6	6
(United States) E Burgin	0	3
(United States) Ca MacGregor	1	4
13	(United States) K Horvath	6	6
(United Kingdom) S Gomer	6	6
(Japan) E Okagawa	1	2
(United States) C Benjamin	3	1
2	(United States) K Gompert	6	6

Third round
8	(France) N Tauziat	6	6
13	(United States) K Horvath	3	1
(United Kingdom) S Gomer	4	2
2	(United States) K Gompert	6	6

Quarterfinals
8	(France) N Tauziat	6	2	6
2	(United States) K Gompert	3	6	4
