= 1986 Virginia Slims World Championship Series =

Women's tennis circuit

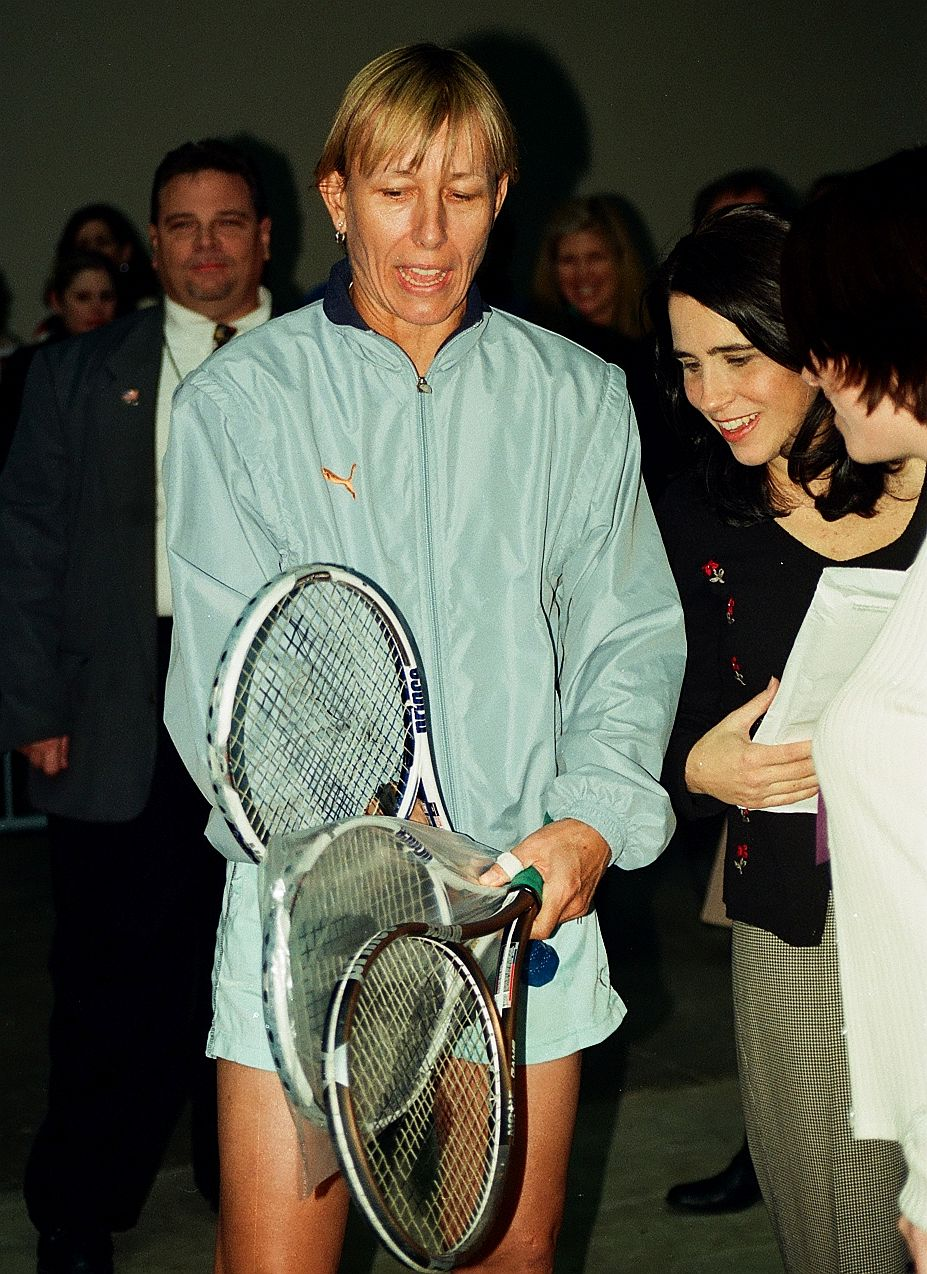
- Martina Navratilova finished the year as world No. 1 for the record-extending seventh time in her career. She won nine tournaments during the season, including two majors at the Wimbledon Championships and the US Open, as well as the March and the November editions of the Virginia Slims Championships. She also finished runner-up at the third major, the French Open (the Australian Open was not held in 1986).

Details
- Duration: March 24 – November 24, 1986
- Edition: 14th
- Tournaments: 41
- Categories: Grand Slam (3); WTA Championships; Tour Events (37)

Achievements (singles)
- Most titles: (United States) Martina Navratilova (9)
- Most finals: (United States) Martina Navratilova (11)
- Prize money leader: (United States) Martina Navratilova $1,905,841
- Points leader: (United States) Martina Navratilova 280.4807

Awards
- Player of the year: (United States) Martina Navratilova
- Doubles team of the year: (United States) Martina Navratilova; (United States) Pam Shriver
- Most improved player of the year: (West Germany) Steffi Graf
- Newcomer of the year: (United States) Stephanie Rehe

The 1986 Virginia Slims World Championship Series was the 14th season since the foundation of the Women's Tennis Association. It commenced on March 24, 1986, and concluded in December, 1986 after 41 events. The season was abbreviated in order to return the tour to a calendar year basis.

The Virginia Slims World Championship Series was the elite tour for professional women's tennis organised by the Women's Tennis Association (WTA). It was held in place of the WTA Tour from 1983 until 1987 and featured tournaments that had previously been part of the Toyota Series and the Avon Series. It included the four Grand Slam tournaments and a series of other events. ITF tournaments were not part of the tour, although they awarded points for the WTA World Ranking. No Australian Open was held during 1986 due to the tournament start date being moved from November to January.

== Schedule ==
The table below shows the 1986 Virginia Slims World Championship Series schedule.

=== March ===
Week	Tournament	Champions	Runners-up	Semifinalists	Quarterfinalists
24 Mar	Virginia Slims of Arizona; Phoenix, United States; Hard (i) – $75,000 – 32S/16D; Singles – Doubles	(United States) Beth Herr; 6–0, 3–6, 7–5	(United States) Ann Henricksson	(West Germany) Claudia Porwik (United States) Peanut Louie	(United States) Camille Benjamin (United States) Hu Na (South Africa) Jennifer Mundel (United States) Tina Mochizuki
24 Mar	Virginia Slims of Arizona; Phoenix, United States; Hard (i) – $75,000 – 32S/16D; Singles – Doubles	(United States) Susan Mascarin (United States) Betsy Nagelsen; 6–4, 5–7, 6–4	(United States) Alycia Moulton (United States) Linda Gates	(West Germany) Claudia Porwik (United States) Peanut Louie	(United States) Camille Benjamin (United States) Hu Na (South Africa) Jennifer Mundel (United States) Tina Mochizuki
24 Mar	Bridgestone Doubles Championships; Nashville, United States; Carpet (i) – $175,000 – 8D	(United States) Barbara Potter (United States) Pam Shriver; 6–4, 6–3	(United States) Kathy Jordan (Australia) Elizabeth Smylie	(Czechoslovakia) Mandlíková / (Australia) Turnbull (Soviet Union) Parkhomenko / (Soviet Union) Savchenko	(South Africa) Fairbank / (United States) Reynolds (United States) Piatek / (United States) White (United States) Burgin / (United States) Walsh (United States) Fernández / (United States) White
31 Mar	Tournament of Champions; Marco Island, United States; Clay – $150,000 – 24S/16D	(United States) Chris Evert-Lloyd; 6–2, 6–4	(West Germany) Claudia Kohde-Kilsch	(Australia) Janine Tremelling (United States) Bonnie Gadusek	(Argentina) Gabriela Sabatini (Brazil) Pat Medrado (Hungary) Andrea Temesvári (United States) Kathy Rinaldi
31 Mar	Tournament of Champions; Marco Island, United States; Clay – $150,000 – 24S/16D	(United States) Martina Navratilova (Hungary) Andrea Temesvári; 7–5, 6–2	(United States) Elise Burgin (United States) Kathy Jordan	(Australia) Janine Tremelling (United States) Bonnie Gadusek	(Argentina) Gabriela Sabatini (Brazil) Pat Medrado (Hungary) Andrea Temesvári (United States) Kathy Rinaldi

=== April ===
Week	Tournament	Champions	Runners-up	Semifinalists	Quarterfinalists
7 Apr	Family Circle Cup; Hilton Head Island, United States; Clay – $200,000 – 56S/32D	(West Germany) Steffi Graf; 6–4, 7–5	(United States) Chris Evert-Lloyd	(United States) Stephanie Rehe (Czechoslovakia) Hana Mandlíková	(Czechoslovakia) Helena Suková (Socialist Federal Republic of Yugoslavia) Sabrina Goleš (Bulgaria) Manuela Maleeva (Argentina) Gabriela Sabatini
7 Apr	Family Circle Cup; Hilton Head Island, United States; Clay – $200,000 – 56S/32D	(United States) Chris Evert-Lloyd (United States) Anne White; 6–3, 6–3	(West Germany) Steffi Graf (France) Catherine Tanvier	(United States) Stephanie Rehe (Czechoslovakia) Hana Mandlíková	(Czechoslovakia) Helena Suková (Socialist Federal Republic of Yugoslavia) Sabrina Goleš (Bulgaria) Manuela Maleeva (Argentina) Gabriela Sabatini
14 Apr	Sunkist WITA Championships; Amelia Island, United States; Clay – $275,000 – 56S/32D	(West Germany) Steffi Graf; 6–4, 5–7, 7–6^{(7–3)}	(West Germany) Claudia Kohde-Kilsch	(United States) Kathy Rinaldi (Argentina) Gabriela Sabatini	(Peru) Laura Gildemeister (Czechoslovakia) Helena Suková (Bulgaria) Manuela Maleeva (Greece) Angelikí Kanellopoúlou
14 Apr	Sunkist WITA Championships; Amelia Island, United States; Clay – $275,000 – 56S/32D	(West Germany) Claudia Kohde-Kilsch (Czechoslovakia) Helena Suková; 6–2, 5–7, 7–6^{(9–7)}	(Argentina) Gabriela Sabatini (France) Catherine Tanvier	(United States) Kathy Rinaldi (Argentina) Gabriela Sabatini	(Peru) Laura Gildemeister (Czechoslovakia) Helena Suková (Bulgaria) Manuela Maleeva (Greece) Angelikí Kanellopoúlou
21 Apr	Wild Dunes; Charleston, United States; Clay – $75,000 – 32S/16D	(United States) Elise Burgin; 6–1, 6–3	(Denmark) Tine Scheuer-Larsen	(Peru) Laura Gildemeister (France) Catherine Tanvier	(Brazil) Neige Dias (United States) Susan Mascarin (United States) Debbie Spence (Switzerland) Lilian Drescher
21 Apr	Wild Dunes; Charleston, United States; Clay – $75,000 – 32S/16D	(Italy) Sandra Cecchini (Socialist Federal Republic of Yugoslavia) Sabrina Goleš; 4–6, 6–0, 6–3	(Peru) Laura Gildemeister (Czechoslovakia) Marcela Skuherská	(Peru) Laura Gildemeister (France) Catherine Tanvier	(Brazil) Neige Dias (United States) Susan Mascarin (United States) Debbie Spence (Switzerland) Lilian Drescher
27 Apr	U.S. Clay Court Championships; Indianapolis, United States; Clay – $275,000 – 56S/32D	(West Germany) Steffi Graf; 2–6, 7–6^{(7–5)}, 6–4	(Argentina) Gabriela Sabatini	(Argentina) Mercedes Paz (Bulgaria) Manuela Maleeva	(United States) Terry Phelps (United States) Melissa Gurney (United States) Robin White (Czechoslovakia) Regina Maršíková
27 Apr	U.S. Clay Court Championships; Indianapolis, United States; Clay – $275,000 – 56S/32D	(West Germany) Steffi Graf (Argentina) Gabriela Sabatini; 6–2, 6–0	(United States) Gigi Fernández (United States) Robin White	(Argentina) Mercedes Paz (Bulgaria) Manuela Maleeva	(United States) Terry Phelps (United States) Melissa Gurney (United States) Robin White (Czechoslovakia) Regina Maršíková

=== May ===
Week	Tournament	Champions	Runners-up	Semifinalists	Quarterfinalists
5 May	Virginia Slims of Houston; Houston, United States; Clay (i) – $150,000 – 32S/16D; Singles – Doubles	(United States) Chris Evert-Lloyd; 6–4, 2–6, 6–4	(United States) Kathy Rinaldi	(United States) Pam Casale (United States) Laura Gildemeister	(United States) Kate Gompert (United States) Wendy White (United States) Zina Garrison (Australia) Wendy Turnbull
5 May	Virginia Slims of Houston; Houston, United States; Clay (i) – $150,000 – 32S/16D; Singles – Doubles	(United States) Chris Evert-Lloyd (Australia) Wendy Turnbull; 6–2, 6–4	(United States) Elise Burgin (United States) JoAnne Russell	(United States) Pam Casale (United States) Laura Gildemeister	(United States) Kate Gompert (United States) Wendy White (United States) Zina Garrison (Australia) Wendy Turnbull
5 May	Barcelona Open; Barcelona, Spain; Clay – $50,000 – 32S/16D	(Austria) Petra Huber; 7–6^{(7–4)}, 6–0	(Italy) Laura Garrone	(Spain) Arantxa Sánchez Vicario (Brazil) Pat Medrado	(France) Nathalie Herreman (Argentina) Mercedes Paz (Sweden) Carina Karlsson (France) Isabelle Demongeot
5 May	Barcelona Open; Barcelona, Spain; Clay – $50,000 – 32S/16D	(Czechoslovakia) Iva Budařová (France) Catherine Tanvier; 6–2, 6–1	(France) Nathalie Herreman (France) Corrinne Vanier	(Spain) Arantxa Sánchez Vicario (Brazil) Pat Medrado	(France) Nathalie Herreman (Argentina) Mercedes Paz (Sweden) Carina Karlsson (France) Isabelle Demongeot
12 May	German Open; West Berlin, West Germany; Clay – $150,000 – 56S/29D	(West Germany) Steffi Graf; 6–2, 6–3	(United States) Martina Navratilova	(West Germany) Claudia Kohde-Kilsch (Czechoslovakia) Hana Mandlíková	(United Kingdom) Jo Durie (Austria) Petra Huber (West Germany) Bettina Bunge (Hungary) Andrea Temesvári
12 May	German Open; West Berlin, West Germany; Clay – $150,000 – 56S/29D	(West Germany) Steffi Graf (Czechoslovakia) Helena Suková; 7–5, 6–2	(United States) Martina Navratilova (Hungary) Andrea Temesvári	(West Germany) Claudia Kohde-Kilsch (Czechoslovakia) Hana Mandlíková	(United Kingdom) Jo Durie (Austria) Petra Huber (West Germany) Bettina Bunge (Hungary) Andrea Temesvári
19 May	European Open; Lugano, Switzerland; Clay – $100,000 – 56S/32D; Singles – Doubles	(Italy) Raffaella Reggi; 5–7, 6–3, 7–6^{(8–6)}	(Bulgaria) Manuela Maleeva	(Socialist Federal Republic of Yugoslavia) Sabrina Goleš (West Germany) Bettina Bunge	(Greece) Angelikí Kanellopoúlou (Canada) Helen Kelesi (United States) Terry Phelps (United States) Mary Joe Fernández
19 May	European Open; Lugano, Switzerland; Clay – $100,000 – 56S/32D; Singles – Doubles	(United States) Elise Burgin (United States) Betsy Nagelsen; 6–2, 6–3	(Australia) Jenny Byrne (Australia) Janine Thompson	(Socialist Federal Republic of Yugoslavia) Sabrina Goleš (West Germany) Bettina Bunge	(Greece) Angelikí Kanellopoúlou (Canada) Helen Kelesi (United States) Terry Phelps (United States) Mary Joe Fernández
26 May	French Open; Paris, France; Grand Slam; Clay – $1,150,000 – 128S/64D/64X; Singles – Doubles – Mixed doubles	(United States) Chris Evert-Lloyd; 2–6, 6–3, 6–3	(United States) Martina Navratilova	(Czechoslovakia) Hana Mandlíková (Czechoslovakia) Helena Suková	(United States) Kathy Rinaldi (United States) Mary Joe Fernández (West Germany) Steffi Graf (Canada) Carling Bassett
26 May	French Open; Paris, France; Grand Slam; Clay – $1,150,000 – 128S/64D/64X; Singles – Doubles – Mixed doubles	(United States) Martina Navratilova (Hungary) Andrea Temesvári; 6–1, 6–2	(West Germany) Steffi Graf (Argentina) Gabriela Sabatini	(Czechoslovakia) Hana Mandlíková (Czechoslovakia) Helena Suková	(United States) Kathy Rinaldi (United States) Mary Joe Fernández (West Germany) Steffi Graf (Canada) Carling Bassett
26 May	French Open; Paris, France; Grand Slam; Clay – $1,150,000 – 128S/64D/64X; Singles – Doubles – Mixed doubles	(United States) Kathy Jordan (United States) Ken Flach; 3–6, 7–6^{(7–3)}, 6–3	(South Africa) Rosalyn Fairbank (Australia) Mark Edmondson	(Czechoslovakia) Hana Mandlíková (Czechoslovakia) Helena Suková	(United States) Kathy Rinaldi (United States) Mary Joe Fernández (West Germany) Steffi Graf (Canada) Carling Bassett

=== June ===
Week	Tournament	Champions	Runners-up	Semifinalists	Quarterfinalists
9 Jun	Edgbaston Cup; Birmingham, Great Britain; Grass – $125,000 – 56S/32D; Singles	(United States) Pam Shriver; 6–2, 7–6^{(7–0)}	(Bulgaria) Manuela Maleeva	(Soviet Union) Larisa Savchenko (United States) Kathy Rinaldi	(Japan) Etsuko Inoue (United States) Ann Henricksson (United States) Alycia Moulton (United States) Molly Van Nostrand
9 Jun	Edgbaston Cup; Birmingham, Great Britain; Grass – $125,000 – 56S/32D; Singles	(United States) Elise Burgin (South Africa) Rosalyn Fairbank; 6–2, 6–4	(Australia) Elizabeth Smylie (Australia) Wendy Turnbull	(Soviet Union) Larisa Savchenko (United States) Kathy Rinaldi	(Japan) Etsuko Inoue (United States) Ann Henricksson (United States) Alycia Moulton (United States) Molly Van Nostrand
16 Jun	Pilkington Glass Championships; Eastbourne, Great Britain; Grass – $200,000 – 64S/32D	(United States) Martina Navratilova; 3–6, 6–3, 6–4	(Czechoslovakia) Helena Suková	(West Germany) Claudia Kohde-Kilsch (United States) Robin White	(Japan) Etsuko Inoue (United States) Zina Garrison (Soviet Union) Larisa Savchenko (Argentina) Gabriela Sabatini
16 Jun	Pilkington Glass Championships; Eastbourne, Great Britain; Grass – $200,000 – 64S/32D	(United States) Martina Navratilova (United States) Pam Shriver; 6–2, 6–4	(West Germany) Claudia Kohde-Kilsch (Czechoslovakia) Helena Suková	(West Germany) Claudia Kohde-Kilsch (United States) Robin White	(Japan) Etsuko Inoue (United States) Zina Garrison (Soviet Union) Larisa Savchenko (Argentina) Gabriela Sabatini
23 Jun	Wimbledon Championships; London, Great Britain; Grand Slam; Grass – $1,306,690 – 128S/64Q/64D/64X; Singles – Doubles – Mixed doubles	(United States) Martina Navratilova; 7–6^{(7–1)}, 6–3	(Czechoslovakia) Hana Mandlíková	(Argentina) Gabriela Sabatini (United States) Chris Evert-Lloyd	(West Germany) Bettina Bunge (Sweden) Catarina Lindqvist (United States) Lori McNeil (Czechoslovakia) Helena Suková
23 Jun	Wimbledon Championships; London, Great Britain; Grand Slam; Grass – $1,306,690 – 128S/64Q/64D/64X; Singles – Doubles – Mixed doubles	(United States) Martina Navratilova (United States) Pam Shriver; 6–1, 6–3	(Czechoslovakia) Hana Mandlíková (Australia) Wendy Turnbull	(Argentina) Gabriela Sabatini (United States) Chris Evert-Lloyd	(West Germany) Bettina Bunge (Sweden) Catarina Lindqvist (United States) Lori McNeil (Czechoslovakia) Helena Suková
23 Jun	Wimbledon Championships; London, Great Britain; Grand Slam; Grass – $1,306,690 – 128S/64Q/64D/64X; Singles – Doubles – Mixed doubles	(United States) Kathy Jordan (United States) Ken Flach; 6–3, 7–6^{(9–7)}	(United States) Martina Navratilova (Switzerland) Heinz Günthardt	(Argentina) Gabriela Sabatini (United States) Chris Evert-Lloyd	(West Germany) Bettina Bunge (Sweden) Catarina Lindqvist (United States) Lori McNeil (Czechoslovakia) Helena Suková

=== July ===
Week	Tournament	Champions	Runners-up	Semifinalists	Quarterfinalists
7 Jul	Ellesse Grand Prix; Perugia, Italy; Clay – $75,000 – 32S/16D	(France) Nathalie Herreman; 6–2, 6–4	(Switzerland) Csilla Bartos-Cserepy	(Socialist Federal Republic of Yugoslavia) Sabrina Goleš (Italy) Laura Garrone	(West Germany) Isabel Cueto (Argentina) Ivanna Madruga-Osses (Italy) Lorenza Jachia (Argentina) Bettina Fulco
7 Jul	Ellesse Grand Prix; Perugia, Italy; Clay – $75,000 – 32S/16D	(Netherlands) Carin Bakkum (Netherlands) Nicole Muns-Jagerman; 6–4, 6–4	(Switzerland) Csilla Bartos-Cserepy (United States) Amy Holton	(Socialist Federal Republic of Yugoslavia) Sabrina Goleš (Italy) Laura Garrone	(West Germany) Isabel Cueto (Argentina) Ivanna Madruga-Osses (Italy) Lorenza Jachia (Argentina) Bettina Fulco
14 Jul	Virginia Slims of Newport; Newport, United States; Grass – $150,000 – 32S/16D; Singles – Doubles	(United States) Pam Shriver; 6–4, 6–2	(United States) Lori McNeil	(United States) Cammy Macgregor (United States) Anne White	(Brazil) Cláudia Monteiro (United States) Wendy White (Argentina) Adriana Villagrán (United States) Terry Holladay
14 Jul	Virginia Slims of Newport; Newport, United States; Grass – $150,000 – 32S/16D; Singles – Doubles	(United States) Terry Holladay (United States) Heather Ludloff; 6–1, 6–7^{(4–7)}, 6–3	(United States) Cammy MacGregor (United States) Gretchen Magers	(United States) Cammy Macgregor (United States) Anne White	(Brazil) Cláudia Monteiro (United States) Wendy White (Argentina) Adriana Villagrán (United States) Terry Holladay
14 Jul	Elektra Cup; Bregenz, Austria; Clay – $50,000 – 32S/16D/32Q	(Italy) Sandra Cecchini; 6–4, 6–0	(Argentina) Mariana Pérez Roldán	(Argentina) Patricia Tarabini (Denmark) Tine Scheuer-Larsen	(West Germany) Isabel Cueto (Austria) Barbara Paulus (Czechoslovakia) Olga Votavová (West Germany) Gabriela Dinu
14 Jul	Elektra Cup; Bregenz, Austria; Clay – $50,000 – 32S/16D/32Q	(Austria) Petra Huber (West Germany) Petra Keppeler; 6–2, 6–4	(Socialist Federal Republic of Yugoslavia) Sabrina Goleš (Denmark) Tine Scheuer-Larsen	(Argentina) Patricia Tarabini (Denmark) Tine Scheuer-Larsen	(West Germany) Isabel Cueto (Austria) Barbara Paulus (Czechoslovakia) Olga Votavová (West Germany) Gabriela Dinu
21 Jul	Federation Cup; Prague, Czechoslovakia; Team event Clay	United States; 2–1	Czechoslovakia	Argentina; West Germany	Australia; Austria; Bulgaria; Italy
21 Jul	North Face Open Berkeley; Berkeley, United States; Hard – $50,000 – 32S/16D	(United States) Melissa Gurney; 6–1, 6–3	(United States) Barbara Gerken	(United States) Beverly Bowes-Hackney (United States) Elly Hakami	(South Africa) Monica Reinach (United Kingdom) Monique Javer (United States) Kris Kinney (United States) Camille Benjamin
21 Jul	North Face Open Berkeley; Berkeley, United States; Hard – $50,000 – 32S/16D	(United States) Beth Herr (United States) Alycia Moulton; 6–1, 6–2	(United States) Amy Holton (South Africa) Elna Reinach	(United States) Beverly Bowes-Hackney (United States) Elly Hakami	(South Africa) Monica Reinach (United Kingdom) Monique Javer (United States) Kris Kinney (United States) Camille Benjamin
28 Jul	Virginia Slims of San Diego; San Diego, United States; Hard – $75,000 – 32S/16D	(United States) Melissa Gurney; 6–2, 6–4	(United States) Stephanie Rehe	(United States) Kate Gompert (United States) Caroline Kuhlman	(United States) Kathy Jordan (United States) Betsy Nagelsen (South Africa) Dinky Van Rensburg (United States) Debbie Spence
28 Jul	Virginia Slims of San Diego; San Diego, United States; Hard – $75,000 – 32S/16D	(United States) Beth Herr (United States) Alycia Moulton; 5–7, 6–2, 6–4	(United States) Elise Burgin (South Africa) Rosalyn Fairbank	(United States) Kate Gompert (United States) Caroline Kuhlman	(United States) Kathy Jordan (United States) Betsy Nagelsen (South Africa) Dinky Van Rensburg (United States) Debbie Spence

=== August ===
Week	Tournament	Champions	Runners-up	Semifinalists	Quarterfinalists
4 Aug	Player's Canadian Open; Montreal, Canada; Hard – $250,000 – 56S/32D	(Czechoslovakia) Helena Suková; 6–2, 7–5	(United States) Pam Shriver	(South Africa) Rosalyn Fairbank (United States) Zina Garrison	(Italy) Raffaella Reggi (United States) Marianne Werdel (Sweden) Catarina Lindqvist (United States) Kathy Jordan
4 Aug	Player's Canadian Open; Montreal, Canada; Hard – $250,000 – 56S/32D	(United States) Zina Garrison (Argentina) Gabriela Sabatini; 7–6^{(7–2)}, 5–7, 6–4	(United States) Pam Shriver (Czechoslovakia) Helena Suková	(South Africa) Rosalyn Fairbank (United States) Zina Garrison	(Italy) Raffaella Reggi (United States) Marianne Werdel (Sweden) Catarina Lindqvist (United States) Kathy Jordan
11 Aug	Virginia Slims of Los Angeles; Manhattan Beach, United States; Hard – $250,000 – 56S/32D	(United States) Martina Navratilova; 7–6^{(7–5)}, 6–3	(United States) Chris Evert-Lloyd	(Czechoslovakia) Helena Suková (United States) Pam Shriver	(United States) Zina Garrison (West Germany) Claudia Kohde-Kilsch (Argentina) Gabriela Sabatini (Bulgaria) Manuela Maleeva
11 Aug	Virginia Slims of Los Angeles; Manhattan Beach, United States; Hard – $250,000 – 56S/32D	(United States) Martina Navratilova (United States) Pam Shriver; 6–4, 6–3	(West Germany) Claudia Kohde-Kilsch (Czechoslovakia) Helena Suková	(Czechoslovakia) Helena Suková (United States) Pam Shriver	(United States) Zina Garrison (West Germany) Claudia Kohde-Kilsch (Argentina) Gabriela Sabatini (Bulgaria) Manuela Maleeva
18 Aug	United Jersey Bank Classic; Mahwah, United States; Hard – $150,000 – 56S/32D	(West Germany) Steffi Graf; 7–5, 6–1	(United States) Molly Van Nostrand	(United Kingdom) Jo Durie (South Africa) Monica Reinach	(France) Isabelle Demongeot (United Kingdom) Sara Gomer (Czechoslovakia) Regina Maršíková (Czechoslovakia) Helena Suková
18 Aug	United Jersey Bank Classic; Mahwah, United States; Hard – $150,000 – 56S/32D	(United States) Betsy Nagelsen (Australia) Elizabeth Smylie; 7–6^{(7–4)}, 6–3	(West Germany) Steffi Graf (Czechoslovakia) Helena Suková	(United Kingdom) Jo Durie (South Africa) Monica Reinach	(France) Isabelle Demongeot (United Kingdom) Sara Gomer (Czechoslovakia) Regina Maršíková (Czechoslovakia) Helena Suková
25 Aug	US Open; New York City, United States; Grand Slam; Hard – $1,400,000 – 128S/64Q/64D/32X; Singles – Doubles – Mixed doubles	(United States) Martina Navratilova; 6–3, 6–2	(Czechoslovakia) Helena Suková	(West Germany) Steffi Graf (United States) Chris Evert-Lloyd	(United States) Pam Shriver (United States) Bonnie Gadusek (Australia) Wendy Turnbull (Bulgaria) Manuela Maleeva
25 Aug	US Open; New York City, United States; Grand Slam; Hard – $1,400,000 – 128S/64Q/64D/32X; Singles – Doubles – Mixed doubles	(United States) Martina Navratilova (United States) Pam Shriver; 6–4, 3–6, 6–3	(Czechoslovakia) Hana Mandlíková (Australia) Wendy Turnbull	(West Germany) Steffi Graf (United States) Chris Evert-Lloyd	(United States) Pam Shriver (United States) Bonnie Gadusek (Australia) Wendy Turnbull (Bulgaria) Manuela Maleeva
25 Aug	US Open; New York City, United States; Grand Slam; Hard – $1,400,000 – 128S/64Q/64D/32X; Singles – Doubles – Mixed doubles	(Italy) Raffaella Reggi (Spain) Sergio Casal; 6–4, 6–4	(United States) Martina Navratilova (United Kingdom) Peter Fleming	(West Germany) Steffi Graf (United States) Chris Evert-Lloyd	(United States) Pam Shriver (United States) Bonnie Gadusek (Australia) Wendy Turnbull (Bulgaria) Manuela Maleeva

=== September ===
Week	Tournament	Champions	Runners-up	Semifinalists	Quarterfinalists
8 Sep	Pan Pacific Open; Tokyo, Japan; Carpet (i) – $250,000 – 28S/16D	(West Germany) Steffi Graf; 6–4, 6–2	(Bulgaria) Manuela Maleeva	(France) Catherine Tanvier (West Germany) Bettina Bunge	(United States) Wendy White (Bulgaria) Katerina Maleeva (United States) Robin White (United States) Melissa Gurney
8 Sep	Pan Pacific Open; Tokyo, Japan; Carpet (i) – $250,000 – 28S/16D	(West Germany) Bettina Bunge (West Germany) Steffi Graf; 6–1, 6–7^{(4–7)}, 6–2	(Bulgaria) Katerina Maleeva (Bulgaria) Manuela Maleeva	(France) Catherine Tanvier (West Germany) Bettina Bunge	(United States) Wendy White (Bulgaria) Katerina Maleeva (United States) Robin White (United States) Melissa Gurney
15 Sep	Eckerd Open; Tampa United States; Hard – $150,000 – 32S/16D	(United States) Lori McNeil; 2–6, 7–5, 6–2	(United States) Zina Garrison	(United States) Terry Phelps (United States) Michelle Torres	(United States) Elise Burgin (United States) Mary Joe Fernández (United States) Marianne Werdel (United States) Kate Gompert
15 Sep	Eckerd Open; Tampa United States; Hard – $150,000 – 32S/16D	(United States) Elise Burgin (South Africa) Rosalyn Fairbank; 7–5, 6–2	(United States) Gigi Fernández (United States) Kim Sands	(United States) Terry Phelps (United States) Michelle Torres	(United States) Elise Burgin (United States) Mary Joe Fernández (United States) Marianne Werdel (United States) Kate Gompert
15 Sep	Athens Trophy; Athens, Greece; Clay – $75,000 – 32S/16D; Singles – Doubles	(West Germany) Sylvia Hanika; 7–5, 6–1	(Greece) Angelikí Kanellopoúlou	(Italy) Laura Garrone (Argentina) Mariana Pérez Roldán	(West Germany) Isabel Cueto (Austria) Judith Polz (Switzerland) Lilian Drescher (Italy) Federica Bonsignori
15 Sep	Athens Trophy; Athens, Greece; Clay – $75,000 – 32S/16D; Singles – Doubles	(West Germany) Isabel Cueto (Spain) Arantxa Sánchez Vicario; 4–6, 6–2, 6–4	(West Germany) Silke Meier (West Germany) Wiltrud Probst	(Italy) Laura Garrone (Argentina) Mariana Pérez Roldán	(West Germany) Isabel Cueto (Austria) Judith Polz (Switzerland) Lilian Drescher (Italy) Federica Bonsignori
22 Sep	Virginia Slims of Tulsa; Tulsa, United States; Hard – $75,000 – 32S/16D	(United States) Lori McNeil; 6–0, 6–1	(United States) Beth Herr	(South Africa) Dinky Van Rensburg (United States) Mary Lou Piatek	(United States) Tina Mochizuki (United States) Peanut Louie-Harper (United States) Wendy White (Australia) Janine Tremelling
22 Sep	Virginia Slims of Tulsa; Tulsa, United States; Hard – $75,000 – 32S/16D	(United States) Camille Benjamin (South Africa) Dinky Van Rensburg; 7–6^{(7–4)}, 7–5	(Soviet Union) Svetlana Parkhomenko (Soviet Union) Larisa Savchenko	(South Africa) Dinky Van Rensburg (United States) Mary Lou Piatek	(United States) Tina Mochizuki (United States) Peanut Louie-Harper (United States) Wendy White (Australia) Janine Tremelling
29 Sep	Virginia Slims of New Orleans; New Orleans, United States; Carpet (i) – $150,000 – 32S/16D	(United States) Martina Navratilova; 6–1, 4–6, 6–2	(United States) Pam Shriver	(United States) Zina Garrison (Argentina) Gabriela Sabatini	(United States) Terry Phelps (Australia) Wendy Turnbull (Peru) Laura Gildemeister (United States) Kate Gompert
29 Sep	Virginia Slims of New Orleans; New Orleans, United States; Carpet (i) – $150,000 – 32S/16D	(United States) Candy Reynolds (United States) Anne Smith; 6–3, 3–6, 6–3	(Soviet Union) Svetlana Parkhomenko (Soviet Union) Larisa Savchenko	(United States) Zina Garrison (Argentina) Gabriela Sabatini	(United States) Terry Phelps (Australia) Wendy Turnbull (Peru) Laura Gildemeister (United States) Kate Gompert
29 Sep	Hewlett-Packard Trophy; Hilversum, Netherlands; Carpet (i) – $75,000 – 32S/16D	(Czechoslovakia) Helena Suková; 6–2, 7–5	(France) Catherine Tanvier	(Italy) Raffaella Reggi (West Germany) Sylvia Hanika	(France) Nathalie Herreman (Switzerland) Christiane Jolissaint (Netherlands) Nicole Muns-Jagerman (France) Nathalie Tauziat
29 Sep	Hewlett-Packard Trophy; Hilversum, Netherlands; Carpet (i) – $75,000 – 32S/16D	(United States) Kathy Jordan (Czechoslovakia) Helena Suková; 6–3, 3–6, 6–4	(Denmark) Tine Scheuer-Larsen (France) Catherine Tanvier	(Italy) Raffaella Reggi (West Germany) Sylvia Hanika	(France) Nathalie Herreman (Switzerland) Christiane Jolissaint (Netherlands) Nicole Muns-Jagerman (France) Nathalie Tauziat

=== October ===
Week	Tournament	Champions	Runners-up	Semifinalists	Quarterfinalists
6 Oct	European Indoors; Zürich, Switzerland; Carpet (i) – $150,000 – 32S/16D	(West Germany) Steffi Graf; 4–6, 6–2, 6–4	(Czechoslovakia) Helena Suková	(West Germany) Eva Pfaff (United States) Lori McNeil	(United States) Stephanie Rehe (United States) Grace Kim (Peru) Laura Gildemeister (United States) Zina Garrison
6 Oct	European Indoors; Zürich, Switzerland; Carpet (i) – $150,000 – 32S/16D	(West Germany) Steffi Graf (Argentina) Gabriela Sabatini; 1–6, 6–4, 6–4	(United States) Lori McNeil (United States) Alycia Moulton	(West Germany) Eva Pfaff (United States) Lori McNeil	(United States) Stephanie Rehe (United States) Grace Kim (Peru) Laura Gildemeister (United States) Zina Garrison
6 Oct	Taipei Women's Championships; Taipei, Taiwan; Carpet (i) – $50,000 – 32S/16D; Singles – Doubles	(Hong Kong) Patricia Hy; 6–7^{(6–8)}, 6–2, 6–3	(Argentina) Adriana Villagrán	(United States) Barbara Gerken (West Germany) Wiltrud Probst	(Canada) Helen Kelesi (United States) Gigi Fernández (United States) Hu Na (Australia) Susan Leo
6 Oct	Taipei Women's Championships; Taipei, Taiwan; Carpet (i) – $50,000 – 32S/16D; Singles – Doubles	(United States) Lea Antonoplis (United States) Barbara Gerken; 6–1, 6–2	(United States) Gigi Fernández (Australia) Susan Leo	(United States) Barbara Gerken (West Germany) Wiltrud Probst	(Canada) Helen Kelesi (United States) Gigi Fernández (United States) Hu Na (Australia) Susan Leo
13 Oct	Porsche Tennis Grand Prix; Filderstadt, West Germany; Carpet (i) – $175,000 – 32S/16D	(United States) Martina Navratilova; 6–2, 6–3	(Czechoslovakia) Hana Mandlíková	(United States) Pam Shriver (Argentina) Gabriela Sabatini	(Sweden) Catarina Lindqvist (United States) Ann Henricksson (United States) Robin White (United States) Zina Garrison
13 Oct	Porsche Tennis Grand Prix; Filderstadt, West Germany; Carpet (i) – $175,000 – 32S/16D	(United States) Martina Navratilova (United States) Pam Shriver; 7–6^{(7–5)}, 6–4	(United States) Zina Garrison (Argentina) Gabriela Sabatini	(United States) Pam Shriver (Argentina) Gabriela Sabatini	(Sweden) Catarina Lindqvist (United States) Ann Henricksson (United States) Robin White (United States) Zina Garrison
13 Oct	Suntory Japan Open; Tokyo, Japan; Hard – $50,000 – 32S/16D	(Canada) Helen Kelesi; 6–2, 6–2	(Argentina) Bettina Fulco	(Japan) Masako Yanagi (United States) Beth Herr	(United States) Gigi Fernández (Japan) Etsuko Inoue (Japan) Kumiko Okamoto (Brazil) Neige Dias
13 Oct	Suntory Japan Open; Tokyo, Japan; Hard – $50,000 – 32S/16D	(United States) Susan Mascarin (United States) Betsy Nagelsen; 7–5, 5–7, 6–3	(United States) Lea Antonoplis (United States) Barbara Gerken	(Japan) Masako Yanagi (United States) Beth Herr	(United States) Gigi Fernández (Japan) Etsuko Inoue (Japan) Kumiko Okamoto (Brazil) Neige Dias
20 Oct	Pretty Polly Classic; Brighton, Great Britain; Carpet (i) – $200,000 – 32S/16D	(West Germany) Steffi Graf; 6–3, 6–3	(Sweden) Catarina Lindqvist	(South Africa) Rosalyn Fairbank (West Germany) Bettina Bunge	(United States) Robin White (United Kingdom) Jo Durie (West Germany) Claudia Kohde-Kilsch (Czechoslovakia) Helena Suková
20 Oct	Pretty Polly Classic; Brighton, Great Britain; Carpet (i) – $200,000 – 32S/16D	(West Germany) Steffi Graf (Czechoslovakia) Helena Suková; 6–4, 6–4	(Denmark) Tine Scheuer-Larsen (France) Catherine Tanvier	(South Africa) Rosalyn Fairbank (West Germany) Bettina Bunge	(United States) Robin White (United Kingdom) Jo Durie (West Germany) Claudia Kohde-Kilsch (Czechoslovakia) Helena Suková
20 Oct	Singapore Women's Open; Singapore; Hard (i) – $50,000 – 32S/16D; Singles – Doubles	(United States) Gigi Fernández; 6–4, 2–6, 6–4	(Argentina) Mercedes Paz	(Hong Kong) Patricia Hy (Australia) Nicole Bradtke	(Canada) Helen Kelesi (Sweden) Maria Lindström (Japan) Akiko Kijimuta (Netherlands) Manon Bollegraf
20 Oct	Singapore Women's Open; Singapore; Hard (i) – $50,000 – 32S/16D; Singles – Doubles	(United States) Anna-Maria Fernandez (Australia) Julie Richardson; 6–3, 6–2	(United States) Sandy Collins (United States) Sharon Walsh	(Hong Kong) Patricia Hy (Australia) Nicole Bradtke	(Canada) Helen Kelesi (Sweden) Maria Lindström (Japan) Akiko Kijimuta (Netherlands) Manon Bollegraf
27 Oct	Virginia Slims of Indianapolis; Indianapolis, United States; Hard – $75,000 – 32S/16D	(United States) Zina Garrison; 6–3, 6–3	(United States) Melissa Gurney	(United States) Barbara Potter (Australia) Dianne Balestrat	(United States) Wendy Prausa (United States) Susan Sloane-Lundy (United States) Ginny Purdy (United States) Kim Shaefer
27 Oct	Virginia Slims of Indianapolis; Indianapolis, United States; Hard – $75,000 – 32S/16D	(United States) Zina Garrison (United States) Lori McNeil; 4–5, ret.	(United States) Candy Reynolds (United States) Anne Smith	(United States) Barbara Potter (Australia) Dianne Balestrat	(United States) Wendy Prausa (United States) Susan Sloane-Lundy (United States) Ginny Purdy (United States) Kim Shaefer

=== November ===
Week	Tournament	Champions	Runners-up	Semifinalists	Quarterfinalists
3 Nov	Virginia Slims of New England ^{(Nov)} Worcester, United States; Hard (i) – $250,000 – 32S/28D	(United States) Martina Navratilova; 6–2, 6–2	(Czechoslovakia) Hana Mandlíková	(United States) Pam Shriver (West Germany) Bettina Bunge	(Argentina) Gabriela Sabatini (United States) Alycia Moulton (Czechoslovakia) Helena Suková (United States) Lori McNeil
3 Nov	Virginia Slims of New England ^{(Nov)} Worcester, United States; Hard (i) – $250,000 – 32S/28D	(United States) Martina Navratilova (United States) Pam Shriver; 6–3, 6–1	(West Germany) Claudia Kohde-Kilsch (Czechoslovakia) Helena Suková	(United States) Pam Shriver (West Germany) Bettina Bunge	(Argentina) Gabriela Sabatini (United States) Alycia Moulton (Czechoslovakia) Helena Suková (United States) Lori McNeil
3 Nov	Virginia Slims of Arkansas; Little Rock, United States; Carpet (i) – $75,000 – 32S/16D	(United States) Kathy Rinaldi; 6–4, 6–7^{(7–9)}, 6–0	(Soviet Union) Natasha Zvereva	(West Germany) Silke Meier (Brazil) Neige Dias	(United States) Marianne Werdel (Australia) Elizabeth Minter (United States) Beth Herr (United States) Ann Henricksson
3 Nov	Virginia Slims of Arkansas; Little Rock, United States; Carpet (i) – $75,000 – 32S/16D	(Soviet Union) Svetlana Parkhomenko (Soviet Union) Larisa Savchenko; 6–2, 1–6, 6–1	(Czechoslovakia) Iva Budařová (United States) Beth Herr	(West Germany) Silke Meier (Brazil) Neige Dias	(United States) Marianne Werdel (Australia) Elizabeth Minter (United States) Beth Herr (United States) Ann Henricksson
10 Nov	Virginia Slims of Chicago; Chicago, United States; Carpet (i) – $150,000 – 28S/14D	(United States) Martina Navratilova; 7–5, 7–5	(Czechoslovakia) Hana Mandlíková	(United States) Zina Garrison (United States) Pam Shriver	(Argentina) Gabriela Sabatini (Bulgaria) Katerina Maleeva (United States) Kathy Rinaldi (West Germany) Claudia Kohde-Kilsch
10 Nov	Virginia Slims of Chicago; Chicago, United States; Carpet (i) – $150,000 – 28S/14D	(West Germany) Claudia Kohde-Kilsch (Czechoslovakia) Helena Suková; 6–7^{(5–7)}, 7–6^{(7–5)}, 6–3	(West Germany) Steffi Graf (Argentina) Gabriela Sabatini	(United States) Zina Garrison (United States) Pam Shriver	(Argentina) Gabriela Sabatini (Bulgaria) Katerina Maleeva (United States) Kathy Rinaldi (West Germany) Claudia Kohde-Kilsch
10 Nov	Puerto Rico Open; San Juan, Puerto Rico; Hard – $75,000 – 32S/16D	(Italy) Raffaella Reggi; 7–6^{(7–4)}, 4–6, 6–3	(Socialist Federal Republic of Yugoslavia) Sabrina Goleš	(United States) Gigi Fernández (United States) Marianne Werdel	(United States) Lori McNeil (West Germany) Silke Meier (United States) Camille Benjamin (Switzerland) Lilian Drescher
10 Nov	Puerto Rico Open; San Juan, Puerto Rico; Hard – $75,000 – 32S/16D	(United States) Lori McNeil (Argentina) Mercedes Paz; 6–2, 3–6, 6–4	(United States) Gigi Fernández (United States) Robin White	(United States) Gigi Fernández (United States) Marianne Werdel	(United States) Lori McNeil (West Germany) Silke Meier (United States) Camille Benjamin (Switzerland) Lilian Drescher
17 Nov	Virginia Slims Championships; New York City, United States; Carpet (i) – $500,000 – 16S/8D	(United States) Martina Navratilova; 7–6^{(8–6)}, 6–3, 6–2	(West Germany) Steffi Graf	(United States) Pam Shriver (Czechoslovakia) Helena Suková	(West Germany) Bettina Bunge (Czechoslovakia) Hana Mandlíková (West Germany) Claudia Kohde-Kilsch (Bulgaria) Manuela Maleeva
17 Nov	Virginia Slims Championships; New York City, United States; Carpet (i) – $500,000 – 16S/8D	(United States) Martina Navratilova (United States) Pam Shriver; 7–6^{(7–1)}, 6–3	(West Germany) Claudia Kohde-Kilsch (Czechoslovakia) Helena Suková	(United States) Pam Shriver (Czechoslovakia) Helena Suková	(West Germany) Bettina Bunge (Czechoslovakia) Hana Mandlíková (West Germany) Claudia Kohde-Kilsch (Bulgaria) Manuela Maleeva

== Statistical Information ==
=== Titles won by player ===
These tables present the number of singles (S), doubles (D), and mixed doubles (X) titles won by each player and each nation during the season, within all the tournament categories of the 1986 Virginia Slims World Championship Series: the Grand Slam tournaments, the Year-end championships and regular events. The players/nations are sorted by:

1. total number of titles (a doubles title won by two players representing the same nation counts as only one win for the nation);
2. highest amount of highest category tournaments (for example, having a single Grand Slam gives preference over any kind of combination without a Grand Slam title);
3. a singles > doubles > mixed doubles hierarchy;
4. alphabetical order (by family names for players).

Total titles	Player	Grand Slam tournaments			Year-end championships		Regular tournaments		All titles		
Total titles	Player	Singles	Doubles	Mixed	Singles	Doubles	Singles	Doubles	Singles	Doubles	Mixed

=== Titles won by nation ===
Total titles	Country	Grand Slam tournaments			Year-end championships		Regular tournaments		All titles		
Total titles	Country	Singles	Doubles	Mixed	Singles	Doubles	Singles	Doubles	Singles	Doubles	Mixed

== Rankings ==
Below are the 1986 WTA year-end rankings (December 21, 1986) in both singles and doubles competition:

Singles Year-end Ranking
No	Player Name	Points	1985	Change
1	Martina Navratilova (USA)	280.4807	1	=
2	Chris Evert (USA)	231.3610	2	=
3	Steffi Graf (FRG)	201.5582	6	+3
4	Hana Mandlíková (TCH)	120.2212	3	-1
5	Pam Shriver (USA)	105.0486	4	-1
6	Helena Suková (TCH)	105.0105	9	+3
7	Claudia Kohde-Kilsch (FRG)	77.6406	5	-2
8	Kathy Rinaldi (USA)	66.3091	11	+3
9	Gabriela Sabatini (ARG)	62.3303	12	+3
10	Manuela Maleeva (BUL)	60.2089	7	-3
11	Zina Garrison (USA)	56.2920	8	-3
12	Bettina Bunge (FRG)	46.8175	23	+11
13	Bonnie Gadusek (USA)	42.1743	10	-3
14	Lori McNeil (USA)	39.9400	93	+79
15	Kathy Jordan (USA)	37.6000	19	+4
16	Robin White (USA)	37.4706	32	+16
17	Catarina Lindqvist (SWE)	33.5397	13	-4
18	Wendy Turnbull (AUS)	32.5311	14	-4
19	Stephanie Rehe (USA)	32.1875	18	-1
20	Carling Bassett (CAN)	30.2805	15	-5

Doubles Year-end Ranking
No	Player Name	Points	1985	Change
1	Martina Navratilova (USA)	535.5814	2	+1
2	Pam Shriver (USA)	517.8715	1	-1
3	Helena Suková (TCH)	314.8571	3	=
4	Steffi Graf (FRG)	285.5536	50	+46
5	Claudia Kohde-Kilsch (FRG)	284.1027	4	-1
6	Wendy Turnbull (AUS)	265.3746	8	+2
7	Hana Mandlíková (TCH)	235.0833	6	-1
8	Elizabeth Smylie (AUS)	224.3523	7	-1
9	Gabriela Sabatini (ARG)	221.9874	54	+45
10	Kathy Jordan (USA)	166.6954	5	-5
11	Elise Burgin (USA)	163.4288	16	+5
12	Rosalyn Fairbank (RSA)	133.8172	15	+3
13	Andrea Temesvári (HUN)	137.8000	13	=
14	Chris Evert (USA)	135.4000	11	-3
15	Betsy Nagelsen (USA)	163.0163	24	+9
16	Catherine Tanvier (FRA)	122.1875	37	+21
17	Gigi Fernández (USA)	117.7792	10	-7
18	Zina Garrison (USA)	115.6818	44	+26
19	Bettina Bunge (FRG)	114.4018	23	+4
20	Anne White (USA)	113.3373	22	+2

== See also ==
- 1986 Nabisco Grand Prix
- Women's Tennis Association
- International Tennis Federation
