= 1986 Puerto Rico Open =

- Date: November 11–16
- Edition: 1st
- Draw: 32S / 16D
- Prize money: $75,000
- Surface: Hard / outdoor
- Location: San Juan, Puerto Rico
- Venue: San Juan Central Park

Champions

Singles
- (Italy) Raffaella Reggi

Doubles
- (United States) Lori McNeil / (Argentina) Mercedes Paz
- Puerto Rico Open

The 1986 Puerto Rico Open was a women's tennis tournament played on outdoor hard courts at the San Juan Central Park in San Juan in Puerto Rico and was part of the 1986 Virginia Slims World Championship Series. It was the inaugural edition of the tournament (Note: In 1977 and 1978 the Avon Futures of Puerto Rico was held in Puerto Rico and known as the Borniquen Tennis Classic.) and was held from November 11 through November 16, 1986. Third-seeded Raffaella Reggi won the singles title. .

== Finals ==
=== Singles ===
(Italy) Raffaella Reggi defeated (Socialist Federal Republic of Yugoslavia) Sabrina Goleš 7–6^{(7–4)}, 4–6, 6–3

- It was Reggi's 2nd and last singles title of the year and the 3rd of her career.

=== Doubles ===
(United States) Lori McNeil / (Argentina) Mercedes Paz defeated (United States) Gigi Fernández / (United States) Robin White 6–2, 3–6, 6–4

- It was McNeil's 2nd doubles title of the year and the 4th of her career. It was Paz's 1st doubles title of the year and the 4th of her career.
