= 1978 BMW Challenge – Singles =

Singles
- 1978 BMW Challenge

Final
- Champion: (Romania) Virginia Ruzici
- Runner-up: (Netherlands) Betty Stöve
- Score: 5–7, 6–2, 7–5

Details
- Draw: 32
- Seeds: 8

Events
Singles	Doubles
Brighton International	· 1979 →

Virginia Ruzici won the singles title at the 1978 BMW Challenge tennis tournament, defeating Betty Stöve in the final 5–7, 6–2, 7–5, winning her 5th title on the WTA Tour.

== Seeds ==
A champion seed is indicated in bold text while text in italics indicates the round in which that seed was eliminated.

1. (United States) Chris Evert (semifinals)
2. (United Kingdom) Virginia Wade (quarterfinals)
3. (Netherlands) Betty Stöve (final)
4. (Australia) Kerry Reid (semifinals)
5. (Romania) **Virginia Ruzici (champion)**
6. (United States) Marita Redondo (first round)
7. (Czechoslovakia) Regina Maršíková (first round)
8. (Socialist Federal Republic of Yugoslavia) Mima Jaušovec (quarterfinals)

== Draw ==
=== Key ===
- Q = Qualifier
- WC = Wild card
- LL = Lucky loser
- Alt = Alternate
- SE = Special exempt
- PR = Protected ranking
- ITF = ITF entry
- JE = Junior exempt
- w/o = Walkover
- r = Retired
- d = Defaulted
- SR = Special ranking

First round
1	(United States) **C Evert**	5	**6**	**6**
(United States) R Blount	**7**	1	3
(United States) **J Russell**	**6**	6	**6**
Q	(South Africa) B Cuypers	4	**7**	4
(West Germany) **S Hanika**	**7**	**6**
WC	(United Kingdom) M Tyler	5	4
LL	(United Kingdom) **K Glancy**	**6**	**6**
7	(Czechoslovakia) R Maršíková	1	2
3	(Netherlands) **B Stöve**	**6**	**6**
(Sweden) E Ekblom	1	3
(United Kingdom) A Hobbs	**6**	3	3
(United Kingdom) **G Coles**	1	**6**	**6**
(United Kingdom) S Barker	**6**	6	Ret
WC	(Romania) **M Simionescu**	4	**7**	**1**
Q	(Sweden) **N Bohm**	**6**	**6**
6	(United States) M Redondo	4	0
8	(Socialist Federal Republic of Yugoslavia) **M Jaušovec**	**6**	**6**
(United States) J Evert	0	2
(West Germany) H Eisterlehner	**6**	4	3
Q	(Netherlands) **T Zwaan**	1	**6**	**6**
(South Africa) **T Harford**	**7**	3	**7**
(United States) B Nagelsen	5	**6**	5
(South Africa) I Kloss	6	3
4	(Australia) **K Reid**	**7**	**6**
5	(Romania) **V Ruzici**	**6**	**6**
(United States) S Walsh	4	0
(United Kingdom) **B Thompson**	**7**	4	**6**
(Belgium) M Gurdal	6	**7**	3
(United Kingdom) C Molesworth	3	1
(Australia) **L Hunt**	**6**	**6**
(United Kingdom) J Durie	4	0
2	(United Kingdom) **V Wade**	**6**	**6**

Second round
1	(United States) **C Evert**	**6**	**6**
(United States) J Russell	0	2
(West Germany) **S Hanika**	**6**	**6**
LL	(United Kingdom) K Glancy	1	1
3	(Netherlands) **B Stöve**	**6**	**6**
(United Kingdom) A Hobbs	2	3
(Romania) M Simionescu	3	**6**	0
5	(Sweden) **N Bohm**	**6**	1	**6**
8	(Socialist Federal Republic of Yugoslavia) **M Jaušovec**	**6**	**6**
(Netherlands) T Zwaan	2	4
(South Africa) T Harford	3	3
4	(Australia) **K Reid**	**6**	**6**
5	(Romania) **V Ruzici**	**6**	**6**
(United Kingdom) B Thompson	0	3
(Australia) L Hunt	2	4
2	(United Kingdom) **V Wade**	**6**	**6**

Quarterfinals
1	(United States) **C Evert**	**6**	**6**
(West Germany) S Hanika	3	4
3	(Netherlands) **B Stöve**	**6**	**6**
Q	(Sweden) N Bohm	1	2
8	(Socialist Federal Republic of Yugoslavia) M Jaušovec	3	4
4	(Australia) **K Reid**	**6**	**6**
5	(Romania) **V Ruzici**	**6**	**6**
2	(United Kingdom) V Wade	3	4

Semifinals
1	(United States) C Evert
3	(Netherlands) **B Stöve**	**w/o**
4	(Australia) K Reid	5	4
5	(Romania) **V Ruzici**	**7**	**6**

Final
1	(Netherlands) Betty Stöve	**7**	2	5
8	(Romania) **Virginia Ruzici**	5	**6**	**7**
