= 1986 Hewlett-Packard Trophy =

- Date: 29 September – 5 October
- Edition: 2nd
- Draw: 32S / 16D
- Prize money: $75,000
- Surface: Carpet / indoor
- Location: Hilversum, Netherlands

Champions

Singles
- (Czechoslovakia) Helena Suková

Doubles
- (United States) Kathy Jordan / (Czechoslovakia) Helena Suková
← 1985 ·	Hewlett-Packard Trophy

The 1986 Hewlett-Packard Trophy was a women's tennis tournament played on indoor carpet courts in Hilversum, Netherlands which was part of the 1986 WTA Tour. It was the 2nd and last edition off the tournament and was played from 29 September until 5 October 1986. First-seeded Helena Suková won the singles title.

== Finals ==
=== Singles ===
(Czechoslovakia) Helena Suková defeated (France) Catherine Tanvier 6–2, 7–5

- It was Suková 2nd singles title of the year and the 4th of her career

=== Doubles ===
(United States) Kathy Jordan / (Czechoslovakia) Helena Suková defeated (Denmark) Tine Scheuer-Larsen / (France) Catherine Tanvier 7–5, 6–1
