= 1980 Daihatsu Challenge =

- Date: 20–26 October
- Edition: 3rd
- Category: Colgate Series (AAA)
- Draw: 32S / 16D
- Prize money: $125,000
- Surface: Carpet (Supreme) / indoor
- Location: Brighton, England
- Venue: Brighton Centre

Champions

Singles
- (United States) Chris Evert-Lloyd

Doubles
- (United States) Kathy Jordan / (United States) Anne Smith
← 1979 ·	Brighton International	· 1981 →

The 1980 Daihatsu Challenge was a women's singles tennis tournament played on indoor carpet courts at the Brighton Centre in Brighton in England. The event was part of the AAA (Note: Tournaments with prize money for the women of at least $125,000.) category of the 1980 Colgate Series. It was the third edition of the tournament and was held from 20 October through 25 October 1980. First-seeded Chris Evert-Lloyd won the singles title and earned $22,000 first-prize money.

== Finals ==
=== Singles ===
(United States) Chris Evert-Lloyd defeated (United States) Martina Navratilova 6–4, 5–7, 6–3

- It was Evert-Lloyd's 8th singles title of the year and the 101st of her career.

=== Doubles ===
(United States) Kathy Jordan / (United States) Anne Smith defeated (United States) Martina Navratilova / (Netherlands) Betty Stöve 6–3, 7–5

== Prize money ==
Event	W	F	SF	QF	Round of 16	Round of 32
Singles	$22,000	$11,000	$5,875	$2,800	$1,400	$700
