= 1987 Virginia Slims of New Orleans =

- Date: September 28 – October 4
- Edition: 4th
- Category: Category 3
- Draw: 32S / 16D
- Prize money: $150,000
- Surface: Carpet / indoor
- Location: New Orleans, Louisiana, U.S.

Champions

Singles
- (United States) Chris Evert

Doubles
- (United States) Zina Garrison / (United States) Lori McNeil
← 1986 ·	Virginia Slims of New Orleans	· 1988 →

The 1987 Virginia Slims of New Orleans was a women's tennis tournament played on indoor carpet courts in New Orleans, Louisiana in the United States that was part of the 1987 Virginia Slims World Championship Series. It was the fourth edition of the tournament and was held from September 28 through October 4, 1987. First-seeded Chris Evert won the singles title, her second at the event after 1985, and earned $30,000 first-prize money.

== Finals ==
=== Singles ===
(United States) Chris Evert defeated (United States) Lori McNeil 6–3, 7–5

- It was Evert's 5th singles title of the year and the 153rd of her career.

=== Doubles ===
(United States) Zina Garrison / (United States) Lori McNeil defeated (United States) Peanut Louie-Harper / (United States) Heather Ludloff 6–3, 6–3
