= 1983 Australian Open – Women's doubles =

Women's doubles
- 1983 Australian Open

Final
- Champions: (United States) Martina Navratilova (United States) Pam Shriver
- Runners-up: (United Kingdom) Anne Hobbs (Australia) Wendy Turnbull
- Score: 6–4, 6–7, 6–2

Details
- Draw: 32
- Seeds: 8

Events
Singles	men	women		boys	girls
Doubles	men	women	mixed	boys	girls
WC Singles	men	women	quad
WC Doubles	men	women	quad
Legends	men	women	mixed
- Australian Open

Defending champions Martina Navratilova and Pam Shriver successfully defended their title, defeating Anne Hobbs and Wendy Turnbull in the final, 6–4, 6–7, 6–2 to win the women's doubles tennis title at the 1983 Australian Open.

== Seeds ==
Champion seeds are indicated in bold text while text in italics indicates the round in which those seeds were eliminated.

1. (United States) **Martina Navratilova** / (United States) **Pam Shriver (champions)**
2. (United States) Billie Jean King / (United States) Sharon Walsh (semifinals)
3. (United States) Kathy Jordan / (United States) Barbara Potter (semifinals)
4. (United Kingdom) Jo Durie / (United States) Ann Kiyomura (quarterfinals)
5. (South Africa) Rosalyn Fairbank / (West Germany) Eva Pfaff (quarterfinals)
6. (United Kingdom) Anne Hobbs / (Australia) Wendy Turnbull (final)
7. (West Germany) Claudia Kohde-Kilsch / (France) Catherine Tanvier (first round)
8. (United States) Alycia Moulton / (United States) Paula Smith (quarterfinals)

== Draw ==
Key

- Q = Qualifier
- WC = Wild card
- LL = Lucky loser
- Alt = Alternate
- ITF = ITF entry
- PR = Protected ranking
- SR = Special ranking
- SE = Special exempt
- JE = Junior exempt
- JR = Junior Accelerator Programme entrant
- CO = College Accelerator Programme entrant
- NG = Next Gen Accelerator Program entrant
- w/o = Walkover
- r = Retired
- d = Defaulted

=== Final ===
Final
1	(United States) **Martina Navratilova** (United States) **Pam Shriver**	**6**	6	**6**
6	(United Kingdom) Anne Hobbs (Australia) Wendy Turnbull	4	**7**	2

=== Top half ===
First round
1	(United States) **M Navratilova** (United States) **P Shriver**	**6**	**6**
(Czechoslovakia) I Budařová (Czechoslovakia) M Skuherská	1	1
(Australia) A Minter (Australia) E Minter	1	2
(United States) **B Jordan** (Australia) **E Sayers**	**6**	**6**
(United Kingdom) S Gomer (United Kingdom) J Salmon	**6**	3	3
(United States) **C Benjamin** (France) **C Vanier**	2	**6**	**6**
(France) P Paradis (France) C Suire	3	0
5	(South Africa) **R Fairbank** (West Germany) **E Pfaff**	**6**	**6**
3	(United States) **K Jordan** (United States) **B Potter**	**6**	**7**
(United States) G Fernández (United States) B Herr	4	5
(United States) L Antonoplis (United States) A M Fernandez	**7**	2	0
(Brazil) **C Monteiro** (South Africa) **Y Vermaak**	5	**6**	**6**
(United States) **S Acker** (United States) **L Forood**	**6**	**6**
(United States) B Norton (United States) K Shaefer	3	4
(Australia) R Bryant (Australia) K Pratt	3	0
8	(United States) **A Moulton** (United States) **P Smith**	**6**	**6**

Second round
1	(United States) **M Navratilova** (United States) **P Shriver**	**6**	**6**
(United States) B Jordan (Australia) E Sayers	2	1
(United States) C Benjamin (France) C Vanier	4	3
5	(South Africa) **R Fairbank** (West Germany) **E Pfaff**	**6**	**6**
3	(United States) **K Jordan** (United States) **B Potter**	**7**	**6**
(Brazil) C Monteiro (South Africa) Y Vermaak	5	0
(United States) S Acker (United States) L Forood	5	3
8	(United States) **A Moulton** (United States) **P Smith**	**7**	**6**

Quarterfinals
1	(United States) **M Navratilova** (United States) **P Shriver**	**6**	**6**
5	(South Africa) R Fairbank (West Germany) E Pfaff	3	3
3	(United States) **K Jordan** (United States) **B Potter**	2	**6**	**8**
8	(United States) A Moulton (United States) P Smith	**6**	1	6

Semifinals
1	(United States) **M Navratilova** (United States) **P Shriver**	**6**	**6**
3	(United States) K Jordan (United States) B Potter	3	2

=== Bottom half ===
First round
6	(United Kingdom) **A Hobbs** (Australia) **W Turnbull**	**6**	**6**
(Australia) B Remilton (Japan) N Sato	3	2
(United States) **Z Garrison** (United States) **L McNeil**	**7**	**7**
(Australia) C O'Neil (Australia) P Whytcross	5	5
(Australia) J Byrne (Australia) J Tremelling	3	4
(United Kingdom) **V Wade** (United States) **A White**	**6**	**6**
(Canada) C Bassett (United States) B Nagelsen	1	5
4	(United Kingdom) **J Durie** (United States) **A Kiyomura**	**6**	**7**
7	(West Germany) C Kohde-Kilsch (France) C Tanvier
(South Africa) **I Kloss** (United States) **H Ludloff**	w/o
(Australia) S Leo (Netherlands) M Mesker	4	5
(Australia) **N Gregory** (Australia) **B Randall**	**6**	**7**
(Australia) A Tobin-Dingwall (Netherlands) B Stöve	**7**	4	4
(United States) **A Henricksson** (South Africa) **J Mundel**	5	**6**	**6**
(Australia) D Freeman (Australia) A Gulley	1	2
2	(United States) **B J King** (United States) **S Walsh**	**6**	**6**

Second round
6	(United Kingdom) **A Hobbs** (Australia) **W Turnbull**	**6**	**6**
(United States) Z Garrison (United States) L McNeil	1	2
(United Kingdom) V Wade (United States) A White	5	6
4	(United Kingdom) **J Durie** (United States) **A Kiyomura**	**7**	**7**
(South Africa) **I Kloss** (United States) **H Ludloff**	**6**	**7**
(Australia) N Gregory (Australia) B Randall	4	6
(United States) A Henricksson (South Africa) J Mundel	0	0
2	(United States) **B J King** (United States) **S Walsh**	**6**	**6**

Quarterfinals
6	(United Kingdom) **A Hobbs** (Australia) **W Turnbull**	2	**6**	**6**
4	(United Kingdom) J Durie (United States) A Kiyomura	**6**	2	2
(South Africa) I Kloss (United States) H Ludloff	**6**	4	0
2	(United States) **B J King** (United States) **S Walsh**	4	**6**	**6**

Semifinals
6	(United Kingdom) **A Hobbs** (Australia) **W Turnbull**	**6**	**6**
2	(United States) B J King (United States) S Walsh	4	1
