= 1981 Daihatsu Challenge =

- Date: 19–25 October
- Edition: 4th
- Category: Toyota Series (Cat. 4)
- Draw: 32S / 16D
- Prize money: $125,000
- Surface: Carpet (Supreme) / indoor
- Location: Brighton, England
- Venue: Brighton Centre

Champions

Singles
- (United Kingdom) Sue Barker

Doubles
- (United States) Barbara Potter / (United States) Anne Smith
← 1980 ·	Brighton International	· 1982 →

The 1981 Daihatsu Challenge was a women's singles tennis tournament played on indoor carpet courts at the Brighton Centre in Brighton in England. The event was part of the Category 4 (Note: Tournaments with prize money for the women of at least $125,000.) tier of the 1981 Toyota Series. It was the fourth edition of the tournament and was held from 19 October through 25 October 1981. Seventh-seeded Sue Barker won the singles title and earned $22,000 first-prize money.

== Finals ==
=== Singles ===
(United Kingdom) Sue Barker defeated (Socialist Federal Republic of Yugoslavia) Mima Jaušovec 4–6, 6–1, 6–1

- It was Barker's 1st singles title of the year and the 12th, and last, of her career.

=== Doubles ===
(United States) Barbara Potter / (United States) Anne Smith defeated (Socialist Federal Republic of Yugoslavia) Mima Jaušovec / (United States) Pam Shriver 6–7, 6–3, 6–4

== Prize money ==
Event	W	F	SF	QF	Round of 16	Round of 32
Singles	$22,000	$11,000	$5,500	$2,800	$1,500	$750
