= 2026 Singapore Tennis Open – Singles =

Singles
- 2026 Singapore Tennis Open

Final
- Champion: (Canada) Leylah Fernandez
- Runner-up: (Australia) Talia Gibson
- Score: 7–5, 6–0
- Date: 27 September 2026

Details
- Draw: 28 (4Q / 4WC)
- Seeds: 8

Events
| Singles | Doubles |
- WTA Singapore Open

Leylah Fernandez defeated Talia Gibson in the final, 7–5, 6–0 to win the singles tennis title at the 2026 Singapore Tennis Open. It was her sixth WTA Tour singles title.

Elise Mertens was the defending champion, but lost in the quarterfinals to Maja Chwalińska.

== Seeds ==
The top four seeds received a bye into the second round.

1. Mirra Andreeva (quarterfinals)
2. (United States) Amanda Anisimova (withdrew)
3. (Philippines) Alexandra Eala (second round)
4. (Belgium) Elise Mertens (quarterfinals)
5. (Poland) Maja Chwalińska (semifinals)
6. (Canada) Leylah Fernandez (champion)
7. (Greece) Maria Sakkari (quarterfinals)
8. (Croatia) Donna Vekić (first round)

== Draw ==
Key

- Q = Qualifier
- WC = Wild card
- LL = Lucky loser
- Alt = Alternate
- ITF = ITF entry
- PR = Protected ranking
- SR = Special ranking
- SE = Special exempt
- JE = Junior exempt
- JR = Junior Accelerator Programme entrant
- CO = College Accelerator Programme entrant
- NG = Next Gen Accelerator Program entrant
- w/o = Walkover
- r = Retired
- d = Defaulted

=== Finals ===
Semifinals
6/WC | (Canada) Leylah Fernandez | 1 | 6 | 6
5 | (Poland) Maja Chwalińska | 6 | 4 | 2
Tatiana Prozorova
(Australia) Talia Gibson | w/o

Final
6/WC | (Canada) Leylah Fernandez | 7 | 6
(Australia) Talia Gibson | 5 | 0

=== Top half ===
First round
(Australia) D Kasatkina | 5 | 0
A Sasnovich | 7 | 6
(United States) A Parks | 6 | 6
LL | (Japan) M Yamaguchi | 4 | 3
Q | (Japan) K Okamura | 2 | 3
6/WC | (Canada) L Fernandez | 6 | 6
(Czech Republic) B Krejčíková | 6 | 5 | 7^{7}
Q | (Germany) A-L Friedsam | 0 | 7 | 6^{4}
(United States) V Wolff | 1 | 6^{1}
(Ukraine) O Oliynykova | 6 | 7^{7}
WC | (Slovakia) R Šramková | 4 | 2
5 | (Poland) M Chwalińska | 6 | 6

Second round
1 | M Andreeva | 6 | 6
A Sasnovich | 2 | 2
(United States) A Parks | 4 | 3
6/WC | (Canada) L Fernandez | 6 | 6
4 | (Belgium) E Mertens | w/o
(Czech Republic) B Krejčíková
(Ukraine) O Oliynykova | 0 | 1
5 | (Poland) M Chwalińska | 6 | 6

Quarterfinals
1 | M Andreeva | 2 | 5
6/WC | (Canada) L Fernandez | 6 | 7
4 | (Belgium) E Mertens | 2 | 2
5 | (Poland) M Chwalińska | 6 | 6

Semifinals
6/WC | (Canada) L Fernandez | 1 | 6 | 6
5 | (Poland) M Chwalińska | 6 | 4 | 2

=== Bottom half ===
First round
8 | (Croatia) D Vekić | 1 | 2
(China) Xin Wang | 6 | 6
WC | (Australia) S Hunter | 3 | 7 | 1
Q | (Chinese Taipei) J Garland | 6 | 5 | 6
T Prozorova | 5 | 7^{7} | 6
(Belgium) S Costoulas | 7 | 6^{2} | 2
7 | (Greece) M Sakkari | 6 | 6
(Czech Republic) L Fruhvirtová | 4 | 1
PR | (France) K Mladenovic | 5 | 6 | 4
Q | (Japan) N Hibino | 7 | 3 | 6
(Australia) T Gibson | 6 | 6
WC | (France) F Ferro | 3 | 3

Second round
(China) Xin Wang | 7 | 6
Q | (Chinese Taipei) J Garland | 5 | 4
T Prozorova | 4 | 7 | 6
3 | (Philippines) A Eala | 6 | 5 | 3
7 | (Greece) M Sakkari | 7 | 6
Q | (Japan) N Hibino | 5 | 1
(Australia) T Gibson | 7^{7} | 7^{7}
LL | (Slovakia) V Morvayová | 6^{2} | 6^{1}

Quarterfinals
(China) Xin Wang | 6 | 5 | 4
T Prozorova | 3 | 7 | 6
7 | (Greece) M Sakkari | 1 | 6 | 2
(Australia) T Gibson | 6 | 4 | 6

Semifinals
T Prozorova
(Australia) T Gibson | w/o

== Qualifying ==
=== Seeds ===
1. (Chinese Taipei) Joanna Garland (qualified)
2. (Japan) Nao Hibino (qualified)
3. (Japan) Mei Yamaguchi (qualifying competition, lucky loser)
4. (Germany) Anna-Lena Friedsam (qualified)
5. Sofya Lansere (first round)
6. (Slovakia) Viktória Morvayová (qualifying competition, lucky loser)
7. (Japan) Kyōka Okamura (qualified)
8. (Finland) Anastasia Kulikova (qualifying competition)

=== Qualifiers ===
1. (Chinese Taipei) Joanna Garland
2. (Japan) Nao Hibino
3. (Japan) Kyōka Okamura
4. (Germany) Anna-Lena Friedsam

=== Lucky losers ===
1. (Japan) Mei Yamaguchi
2. (Slovakia) Viktória Morvayová

=== Qualifying draw ===
==== First qualifier ====
First round
1 | (Chinese Taipei) Joanna Garland | 6 | 6
(Australia) Ellen Perez | 1 | 2
WC | (Slovenia) Nika Radišić | 3 | 3
6 | (Slovakia) Viktória Morvayová | 6 | 6

Qualifying competition
1 | (Chinese Taipei) Joanna Garland | 6 | 6
6 | (Slovakia) Viktória Morvayová | 4 | 3

==== Second qualifier ====
First round
2 | (Japan) Nao Hibino | 6 | 6
WC | (Singapore) Kai Ning Chanya Ng | 0 | 1
(Japan) Aoi Ito | 6 | 6
5 | Sofya Lansere | 4 | 4

Qualifying competition
2 | (Japan) Nao Hibino | 6 | 2 | 7^{7}
(Japan) Aoi Ito | 2 | 6 | 6^{2}

==== Third qualifier ====
First round
3 | (Japan) Mei Yamaguchi | 6 | 6
(Norway) Ulrikke Eikeri | 1 | 4
WC | (Singapore) Eva Marie Desvignes | 6^{2} | 3
7 | (Japan) Kyōka Okamura | 7^{7} | 6

Qualifying competition
3 | (Japan) Mei Yamaguchi | 1 | 1
7 | (Japan) Kyōka Okamura | 6 | 6

==== Fourth qualifier ====
First round
4 | (Germany) Anna-Lena Friedsam | 6 | 6
(United States) Desirae Krawczyk | 3 | 4
(China) Wang Jiaqi | 4 | 5
8 | (Finland) Anastasia Kulikova | 6 | 7

Qualifying competition
4 | (Germany) Anna-Lena Friedsam | 6 | 6
8 | (Finland) Anastasia Kulikova | 4 | 3
