= 1988 Virginia Slims of New Orleans =

- Date: October 3–9
- Edition: 5th
- Category: Category 4
- Draw: 28S / 16D
- Prize money: $250,000
- Surface: Hard / outdoor
- Location: New Orleans, Louisiana, U.S.

Champions

Singles
- (United States) Chris Evert

Doubles
- (United States) Beth Herr / (United States) Candy Reynolds
← 1987 ·	Virginia Slims of New Orleans

The 1988 Virginia Slims of New Orleans was a tennis tournament played on outdoor hard courts in New Orleans, Louisiana in the United States and was part of Tier III of the 1988 WTA Tour. It was the fifth, and last, edition of the tournament and ran from October 3 through October 9, 1988. First-seeded Chris Evert won the singles title, her third at the event after 1985 and 1987, and earned $50,000 first-prize money.

== Finals ==
=== Singles ===
(United States) Chris Evert defeated (United States) Anne Smith 6–4, 6–1

- It was Evert's 4th singles title of the year and the 157nd, and last, of her career.

=== Doubles ===
(United States) Beth Herr / (United States) Candy Reynolds defeated (United States) Lori McNeil / (United States) Betsy Nagelsen 6–4, 6–4

- It was Herr's 2nd title of the year and the 6th of her career. It was Reynolds' 2nd title of the year and the 26th of her career.
