= 1987 Virginia Slims of San Diego – Doubles =

Doubles
- 1987 Virginia Slims of San Diego

Final
- Champions: (Czechoslovakia) Jana Novotná (France) Catherine Suire
- Runners-up: (United States) Elise Burgin (United States) Sharon Walsh-Pete
- Score: 6–3, 6–4

Details
- Draw: 24
- Seeds: 8

Events
| Singles | Doubles |
- Southern California Open

Beth Herr and Alycia Moulton were the defending champions, but Herr did not compete this year. Moulton teamed up with Elizabeth Minter and lost in the first round to Elly Hakami and Christina Singer.

Jana Novotná and Catherine Suire won the title by defeating Elise Burgin and Sharon Walsh-Pete 6–3, 6–4 in the final.

== Seeds ==
All seeds received a bye into the second round.

1. (United States) Betsy Nagelsen / (United States) Robin White (second round)
2. (United States) Lori McNeil / (West Germany) Eva Pfaff (semifinals)
3. (South Africa) Rosalyn Fairbank / (United States) Candy Reynolds (semifinals)
4. (United States) Elise Burgin / (United States) Sharon Walsh-Pete (final)
5. (France) Isabelle Demongeot / (France) Nathalie Tauziat (second round)
6. (Australia) Jenny Byrne / (United States) Patty Fendick (quarterfinals)
7. (Czechoslovakia) Jana Novotná / (France) Catherine Suire (champions)
8. (United States) Kathleen Horvath / (Netherlands) Marcella Mesker (quarterfinals)

== Draw ==
Key

- Q = Qualifier
- WC = Wild card
- LL = Lucky loser
- Alt = Alternate
- ITF = ITF entry
- PR = Protected ranking
- SR = Special ranking
- SE = Special exempt
- JE = Junior exempt
- JR = Junior Accelerator Programme entrant
- CO = College Accelerator Programme entrant
- NG = Next Gen Accelerator Program entrant
- w/o = Walkover
- r = Retired
- d = Defaulted

=== Finals ===
Semifinals
7 | (Czechoslovakia) Jana Novotná (France) Catherine Suire | 6 | 6
3 | (South Africa) Rosalyn Fairbank (United States) Candy Reynolds | 2 | 3
4 | (United States) Elise Burgin (United States) Sharon Walsh-Pete | 7 | 3 | 7
2 | (United States) Lori McNeil (West Germany) Eva Pfaff | 6 | 6 | 5

Final
7 | (Czechoslovakia) Jana Novotná (France) Catherine Suire | 6 | 6
4 | (United States) Elise Burgin (United States) Sharon Walsh-Pete | 3 | 4

=== Top half ===
First round
(Brazil) P Medrado (Brazil) C Monteiro | 6 | 2
(United States) P Louie Harper (United States) H Ludloff | 7 | 6
(United States) T Phelps (Italy) R Reggi | 7 | 7
(United States) C Benjamin (United States) J Kaplan | 6 | 6
(United States) E Hakami (West Germany) C Singer | 6 | 6 | 7
(Australia) E Minter (United States) A Moulton | 4 | 7 | 5
(United States) L Antonoplis (United States) B Gerken | 4 | 6 | 6
(United States) Ca MacGregor (United States) Cy MacGregor | 6 | 1 | 2

Second round
1 | (United States) B Nagelsen (United States) R White | 4 | 6 | 4
(United States) P Louie Harper (United States) H Ludloff | 6 | 1 | 6
(United States) T Phelps (Italy) R Reggi | 1 | 6 | 1
7 | (Czechoslovakia) J Novotná (France) C Suire | 6 | 4 | 6
3 | (South Africa) R Fairbank (United States) C Reynolds | 6 | 3 | 6
(United States) E Hakami (West Germany) C Singer | 1 | 6 | 3
(United States) L Antonoplis (United States) B Gerken | 7 | 7
5 | (France) I Demongeot (France) N Tauziat | 6 | 6

Quarterfinals
(United States) P Louie Harper (United States) H Ludloff | 3 | 4
7 | (Czechoslovakia) J Novotná (France) C Suire | 6 | 6
3 | (South Africa) R Fairbank (United States) C Reynolds | 2 | 6 | 6
(United States) L Antonoplis (United States) B Gerken | 6 | 3 | 1

Semifinals
7 | (Czechoslovakia) J Novotná (France) C Suire | 6 | 6
3 | (South Africa) R Fairbank (United States) C Reynolds | 2 | 3

=== Bottom half ===
First round
(South Africa) D Van Rensburg (United States) W White | 5 | 6 | 6
(Italy) L Garrone (Socialist Federal Republic of Yugoslavia) S Goleš | 7 | 1 | 1
(New Zealand) B Cordwell (Australia) A Minter | 5 | 7 | 6
(United States) R Casals (United States) H Na | 7 | 6 | 4
(United States) AM Fernandez (New Zealand) J Richardson | 3 | 3
(Brazil) N Dias (Argentina) P Tarabini | 6 | 6
(Canada) J Hetherington (Hong Kong) P Hy | 6 | 6 | 6
(France) N Herreman (France) P Paradis | 3 | 7 | 3

Second round
8 | (United States) K Horvath (Netherlands) M Mesker | 7 | 3 | 6
(South Africa) D Van Rensburg (United States) W White | 6 | 6 | 4
(New Zealand) B Cordwell (Australia) A Minter | 4 | 1
4 | (United States) E Burgin (United States) S Walsh-Pete | 6 | 6
6 | (Australia) J Byrne (United States) P Fendick | 6 | 7
(Brazil) N Dias (Argentina) P Tarabini | 4 | 5
(Canada) J Hetherington (Hong Kong) P Hy | 1 | 7 | 5
2 | (United States) L McNeil (West Germany) E Pfaff | 6 | 5 | 7

Quarterfinals
8 | (United States) K Horvath (Netherlands) M Mesker | 5 | 6
4 | (United States) E Burgin (United States) S Walsh-Pete | 7 | 7
6 | (Australia) J Byrne (United States) P Fendick | 1 | 2
2 | (United States) L McNeil (West Germany) E Pfaff | 6 | 6

Semifinals
4 | (United States) E Burgin (United States) S Walsh-Pete | 7 | 3 | 7
2 | (United States) L McNeil (West Germany) E Pfaff | 6 | 6 | 5
