= 1986 Pretty Polly Classic =

- Date: 20–26 October
- Edition: 9th
- Draw: 32S / 16D
- Prize money: $200,000
- Surface: Carpet / indoor
- Location: Brighton, England
- Venue: Brighton Centre

Champions

Singles
- (West Germany) Steffi Graf

Doubles
- (West Germany) Steffi Graf / (Czechoslovakia) Helena Suková
- Brighton International

The 1986 Pretty Polly Classic was a women's tennis tournament played on indoor carpet court at the Brighton Centre in Brighton, England that was part of the 1986 Virginia Slims World Championship Series. It was the ninth edition of the tournament and was held from 20 October until 26 October 1986. First-seeded Steffi Graf won the singles title and earned $40,000 first-prize money.

== Finals ==
=== Singles ===
(West Germany) Steffi Graf defeated (Sweden) Catarina Lindqvist 6–3, 6–3

- It was Graf's 8th singles title of the year and of her career.

=== Doubles ===
(West Germany) Steffi Graf / (Czechoslovakia) Helena Suková defeated (Denmark) Tine Scheuer-Larsen / (France) Catherine Tanvier 6–4, 6–4
