= 1989 Midland Group Championships =

- Date: 23–29 October
- Edition: 12th
- Category: Category 4
- Draw: 32S / 16D
- Prize money: $250,000
- Surface: Carpet (Supreme) / indoor
- Location: Brighton, England
- Venue: Brighton Centre

Champions

Singles
- (West Germany) Steffi Graf

Doubles
- (United States) Katrina Adams / (United States) Lori McNeil
| ← 1988 · | Brighton International | · 1990 → |

The 1989 Midland Group Championships was a women's tennis tournament played on indoor carpet courts at the Brighton Centre in Brighton, England that was part of the 1989 WTA Tour. It was the 12th edition of the Brighton International and was held from 23 October until 29 October 1989. First-seeded Steffi Graf won the singles title, her third at the event after 1986 and 1988. She earned $50,000 first-prize money as well as 300 Virginia Slims ranking points.

== Finals ==
=== Singles ===
(West Germany) Steffi Graf defeated (Socialist Federal Republic of Yugoslavia) Monica Seles 7–5, 6–4

- It was Graf's 13th singles title of the year and the 43rd of her career.

=== Doubles ===
(United States) Katrina Adams / (United States) Lori McNeil defeated (Australia) Hana Mandlíková / (Czechoslovakia) Jana Novotná 4–6, 7–6^{(9–7)}, 6–4

== Prize money and ranking points ==
| Event | | W | F | SF | QF | Round of 16 | Round of 32 |
| Singles | Prize money | $50,000 | $22,500 | $11,250 | $5,650 | $2,850 | $1,475 |
| Singles | Points | 300 | 210 | 135 | 70 | 35 | 18 |
