= 1984 Pretty Polly Classic =

- Date: 22–28 October
- Edition: 7th
- Category: Category 3
- Draw: 32S / 16D
- Prize money: $175,000
- Surface: Carpet / indoor
- Location: Brighton, England
- Venue: Brighton Centre

Champions

Singles
- (West Germany) Sylvia Hanika

Doubles
- (United States) Alycia Moulton / (United States) Paula Smith
- Brighton International

The 1984 Pretty Polly Classic was a women's tennis tournament played on indoor carpet court at the Brighton Centre in Brighton, England that was part of the Category 3 (Note: Tournaments with prize money for the women f at least $150,000.) tier of the 1984 Virginia Slims World Championship Series. It was the seventh edition of the tournament and was held from 22 October until 28 October 1984. Seventh-seeded Sylvia Hanika won the singles title and earned $32,000 first-prize money.

== Finals ==
=== Singles ===
(West Germany) Sylvia Hanika defeated (United States) Joanne Russell 6–3, 1–6, 6–2

- It was Hanika's only singles title of the year and the 5th of her career.

=== Doubles ===
(United States) Alycia Moulton / (United States) Paula Smith defeated (United States) Barbara Potter / (United States) Sharon Walsh 6–7, 6–3, 7–5

- It was Moulton's 1st title of the year and the 5th of her career. It was Smith's 3rd title of the year and the 11th of her career.
