= Brighton International =

Defunct tennis tournament
- Tour: WTA Tour (1978-1995); ATP Tour (1996-2000)
- Founded: 1978
- Abolished: 2000
- Editions: 23 (18 women, 5 men)
- Location: Brighton, UK; Bournemouth, UK (1996-1999 men)
- Surface: Carpet / indoor (1978-1995); Clay / outdoor (1996-1999); Hard / indoor (2000)

The Brighton International was a tennis tournament held in Brighton, UK. It was a WTA Tour event from 1978 to 1995 and an ATP Tour event from 1996 to 2000, upon the discontinuation of the women's tournament.

The women's event was held in October. It was competed on indoor carpet courts and was a WTA Tier II event prior to being removed from the tour. The men's event was held on outdoor American green clay courts at the West Hants Tennis Club in Bournemouth from 1996 to 1999, and in Brighton, on indoor hard courts in 2000.

Steffi Graf won the tournament a record 6 times. The only British winners were Sue Barker, who defeated Mima Jaušovec in 1981; and in the men's, Tim Henman, who beat Dominik Hrbatý in the final year of play.

== Results ==
=== Women's singles ===
Year	Tournament name	Champions	Runners-up	Score
↓ Colgate Series ↓
1978	BMW Challenge	(Romania) Virginia Ruzici	(Netherlands) Betty Stöve	5–7, 6–2, 7–5
1979	Daihatsu Challenge	(United States) Martina Navratilova	(United States) Chris Evert	6–3, 6–3
1980	Daihatsu Challenge	(United States) Chris Evert	(Czechoslovakia) Martina Navratilova	6–4, 5–7, 6–3
↓ Toyota Series ↓
1981	Daihatsu Challenge	(United Kingdom) Sue Barker	(Socialist Federal Republic of Yugoslavia) Mima Jaušovec	4–6, 6–1, 6–1
1982	Daihatsu Challenge	(United States) Martina Navratilova (2)	(United States) Chris Evert	6–1, 6–4
↓ Category 3 ↓
1983	Daihatsu Challenge	(United States) Chris Evert (2)	(United Kingdom) Jo Durie	6–1, 6–1
↓ Uncategorized ↓
1984	Pretty Polly Classic	(West Germany) Sylvia Hanika	(United States) JoAnne Russell	6–3, 1–6, 6–2
1985	Pretty Polly Classic	(United States) Chris Evert (3)	(Bulgaria) Manuela Maleeva	7–5, 6–3
1986	Pretty Polly Classic	(West Germany) Steffi Graf	(Sweden) Catarina Lindqvist	6–3, 6–3
↓ Category 4 ↓
1987	Volvo Classic	(Argentina) Gabriela Sabatini	(United States) Pam Shriver	7–5, 6–4
1988	Midland Group Championships	(West Germany) Steffi Graf (2)	(Bulgaria) Manuela Maleeva-Fragnière	6–2, 6–0
1989	Midland Group Championships	(West Germany) Steffi Graf (3)	(Socialist Federal Republic of Yugoslavia) Monica Seles	7–5, 6–4
↓ Tier II ↓
1990	Midland Bank Championships	(Germany) Steffi Graf (4)	(Czechoslovakia) Helena Suková	7–5, 6–3
1991	Midland Bank Championships	(Germany) Steffi Graf (5)	(United States) Zina Garrison	5–7, 6–4, 6–1
1992	Midland Bank Championships	(Germany) Steffi Graf (6)	(Czechoslovakia) Jana Novotná	4–6, 6–4, 7–6^{(7–3)}
1993	Autoglass Classic	(Czech Republic) Jana Novotná	(Germany) Anke Huber	6–2, 6–4
1994	Brighton International	(Czech Republic) Jana Novotná (2)	(Czech Republic) Helena Suková	6–7^{(4–7)}, 6–3, 6–4
1995	Brighton International	(United States) Mary Joe Fernández	(South Africa) Amanda Coetzer	6–4, 7–5

=== Women's doubles ===
Year	Champions	Runners-up	Score
1978	(Netherlands) Betty Stöve (United Kingdom) Virginia Wade	(South Africa) Ilana Kloss (United States) JoAnne Russell	6–0, 7–6
1979	(United States) Ann Kiyomura (United States) Anne Smith	(South Africa) Ilana Kloss (United States) Laura duPont	6–2, 6–1
1980	(United States) Kathy Jordan (United States) Anne Smith	(Czechoslovakia) Martina Navratilova (Netherlands) Betty Stöve	6–3, 7–5
1981	(United States) Barbara Potter (United States) Anne Smith	(Socialist Federal Republic of Yugoslavia) Mima Jaušovec (United States) Pam Shriver	6–7, 6–3, 6–4
1982	(United States) Martina Navratilova (United States) Pam Shriver	(United States) Barbara Potter (United States) Sharon Walsh	2–6, 7–5, 6–4
1983	(United States) Chris Evert-Lloyd (United States) Pam Shriver	(United Kingdom) Jo Durie (United States) Ann Kiyomura	7–5, 6–4
1984	(United States) Alycia Moulton (United States) Paula Smith	(United States) Barbara Potter (United States) Sharon Walsh	6–7, 6–3, 7–5
1985	(United States) Lori McNeil (France) Catherine Suire	(United States) Barbara Potter (Czechoslovakia) Helena Suková	4–6, 7–6, 6–4
1986	(West Germany) Steffi Graf (Czechoslovakia) Helena Suková	(Denmark) Tine Scheuer-Larsen (France) Catherine Tanvier	6–4, 6–4
1987	(United States) Kathy Jordan (Czechoslovakia) Helena Suková	(Denmark) Tine Scheuer-Larsen (France) Catherine Tanvier	7–5, 6–1
1988	(United States) Lori McNeil (United States) Betsy Nagelsen	(France) Isabelle Demongeot (France) Nathalie Tauziat	7–6^{(7–5)}, 2–6, 7–6^{(7–3)}
1989	(United States) Katrina Adams (United States) Lori McNeil	(Australia) Hana Mandlíková (Czechoslovakia) Jana Novotná	4–6, 7–6^{(9–7)}, 6–4
1990	(Czechoslovakia) Helena Suková (France) Nathalie Tauziat	(United Kingdom) Jo Durie (Soviet Union) Natasha Zvereva	6–1, 6–4
1991	(United States) Pam Shriver (Soviet Union) Natasha Zvereva	(United States) Zina Garrison (United States) Lori McNeil	6–1, 6–2
1992	(Czechoslovakia) Jana Novotná (Latvia) Larisa Neiland	(Spain) Conchita Martínez (Czechoslovakia) Radka Zrubáková	6–4, 6–1
1993	(Italy) Laura Golarsa (Ukraine) Natalia Medvedeva	(Germany) Anke Huber (Latvia) Larisa Neiland	6–3, 1–6, 6–4
1994	(Netherlands) Manon Bollegraf (Latvia) Larisa Neiland	(United States) Mary Joe Fernandez (Czech Republic) Jana Novotná	4–6, 6-2, 6–3
1995	(United States) Meredith McGrath (Latvia) Larisa Neiland	(United States) Lori McNeil (Czechoslovakia) Helena Suková	7–5, 6–1

=== Men's singles ===
Year	Champions	Runners-up	Score
1996	(Spain) Albert Costa	(Germany) Marc-Kevin Goellner	6–7^{(4–7)}, 6–2, 6–2
1997	(Spain) Félix Mantilla	(Spain) Carlos Moyà	6–2, 6–2
1998	(Spain) Félix Mantilla	(Spain) Albert Costa	6–3, 7–5
1999	(Romania) Adrian Voinea	(Austria) Stefan Koubek	1–6, 7–5, 7–6^{(7–2)}
2000	(United Kingdom) Tim Henman	(Slovakia) Dominik Hrbatý	6–2, 6–2

=== Men's doubles ===
Year	Champions	Runners-up	Score
1996	(Germany) Marc-Kevin Goellner (United Kingdom) Greg Rusedski	(France) Rodolphe Gilbert (Portugal) Nuno Marques	6–3, 7–6
1997	(United States) Kent Kinnear (North Macedonia) Aleksandar Kitinov	(Spain) Alberto Martín (United Kingdom) Chris Wilkinson	7–6, 6–2
1998	(United Kingdom) Neil Broad (Zimbabwe) Kevin Ullyett	(Australia) Wayne Arthurs (Spain) Alberto Berasategui	7–6, 6–3
1999	(South Africa) David Adams (United States) Jeff Tarango	(Sweden) Nicklas Kulti (Germany) Michael Kohlmann	6–3, 6–7^{(5–7)}, 7–6(^{7–5)}
2000	(Australia) Michael Hill (United States) Jeff Tarango	(United States) Paul Goldstein (United States) Jim Thomas	6–3, 7–5
