= Virginia Slims of New Orleans =

Defunct tennis tournament
- Event name: Virginia Slims of New Orleans
- Tour: WTA Tour
- Founded: 1984
- Abolished: 1988
- Editions: 5
- Surface: Carpet (1984–1987); Hard (1988)

The Virginia Slims of New Orleans is a defunct WTA Tour affiliated women's tennis tournament played from 1984 to 1988. It was held in New Orleans, Louisiana in the United States and was played on indoor carpet courts in the Lakefront Arena from 1984 to 1987 and on outdoor hard courts in 1988.

== Results ==
=== Singles ===
Year	Champions	Runners-up	Score
1984	(United States) Martina Navratilova	(United States) Zina Garrison	6–4, 6–3
1985	(United States) Chris Evert-Lloyd	(United States) Pam Shriver	6–4, 7–5
1986	(United States) Martina Navratilova	(United States) Pam Shriver	6–1, 4–6, 6–2
1987	(United States) Chris Evert	(United States) Lori McNeil	6–3, 7–5
1988	(United States) Chris Evert	(United States) Anne Smith	6–4, 6–1

=== Doubles ===
Year	Champions	Runners-up	Score
1984	(United States) Martina Navratilova (United States) Pam Shriver	(Australia) Wendy Turnbull (United States) Sharon Walsh	6–4, 6–1
1985	(United States) Chris Evert-Lloyd (Australia) Wendy Turnbull	(United States) Mary Lou Piatek (United States) Anne White	6–1, 6–2
1986	(United States) Candy Reynolds (United States) Anne Smith	(Soviet Union) Svetlana Parkhomenko (Soviet Union) Larisa Savchenko	6–3, 3–6, 6–3
1987	(United States) Zina Garrison (United States) Lori McNeil	(United States) Peanut Louie-Harper (United States) Heather Ludloff	6–3, 6–3
1988	(United States) Beth Herr (United States) Candy Reynolds	(United States) Lori McNeil (United States) Betsy Nagelsen	6–4, 6–4
