= 1987 Taipei Women's Championships – Doubles =

Doubles
- 1987 Taipei Women's Championships

Final
- Champions: (United States) Cammy MacGregor (United States) Cynthia MacGregor
- Runners-up: (United States) Sandy Collins (United States) Sharon Walsh-Pete
- Score: 7–6^{(10–8)}, 5–7, 6–4

Details
- Draw: 16
- Seeds: 4

Events
Singles	Doubles
← 1986 ·	Taipei Women's Championships	· 1988 →

Lea Antonoplis and Barbara Gerken were the defending champions, but lost in the semifinals to Sandy Collins and Sharon Walsh-Pete.

Cammy MacGregor and Cynthia MacGregor won the title by defeating Collins and Walsh-Pete 7–6^{(10–8)}, 5–7, 6–4 in the final.

== Seeds ==
1. (United States) Sandy Collins / (United States) Sharon Walsh-Pete (final)
2. (Switzerland) Christiane Jolissaint / (United States) Heather Ludloff (quarterfinals)
3. (United States) Lea Antonoplis / (United States) Barbara Gerken (semifinals)
4. (United States) Anna-Maria Fernandez / (New Zealand) Julie Richardson (quarterfinals)

== Draw ==
=== Key ===
- Q = Qualifier
- WC = Wild card
- LL = Lucky loser
- Alt = Alternate
- SE = Special exempt
- PR = Protected ranking
- ITF = ITF entry
- JE = Junior exempt
- w/o = Walkover
- r = Retired
- d = Defaulted
- SR = Special ranking

=== Draw ===
First round
1	(United States) S Collins (United States) S Walsh-Pete	6	6
(Sweden) C Karlsson (West Germany) C Porwik	1	2
(France) P Paradis (France) Nathalie Phan-Thanh	2	6	2
(Brazil) C Monteiro (Argentina) A Villagrán	6	1	6
3	(United States) L Antonoplis (United States) B Gerken	6	2	6
(Netherlands) C Bakkum (United Kingdom) S Gomer	3	6	2
(Australia) M Jaggard (Italy) C Nozzoli	7	0	3
(Hong Kong) P Hy (Australia) A Minter	5	6	6
(New Zealand) B Cordwell (Australia) L Field	6	6
(Chinese Taipei) Lin Fang-ling (Chinese Taipei) Lin Ya-hui	2	0
(Sweden) H Dahlström (Norway) A Jönsson Raaholt	5	2
4	(United States) AM Fernandez (New Zealand) J Richardson	7	6
(United States) J Goodling (Japan) N Sato	5	2
(United States) Ca MacGregor (United States) Cy MacGregor	7	6
(France) A Dechaume (France) E Derly	7	3	3
2	(Switzerland) C Jolissaint (United States) H Ludloff	6	6	6

Quarterfinals
1	(United States) S Collins (United States) S Walsh-Pete	4	6	6
(Brazil) C Monteiro (Argentina) A Villagrán	6	4	3
3	(United States) L Antonoplis (United States) B Gerken	6	6
(Hong Kong) P Hy (Australia) A Minter	4	2
(New Zealand) B Cordwell (Australia) L Field	6	6
4	(United States) AM Fernandez (New Zealand) J Richardson	4	2
(United States) Ca MacGregor (United States) Cy MacGregor	6	6
2	(Switzerland) C Jolissaint (United States) H Ludloff	2	3

Semifinals
1	(United States) S Collins (United States) S Walsh-Pete	5	6	6
3	(United States) L Antonoplis (United States) B Gerken	7	2	3
(New Zealand) B Cordwell (Australia) L Field	3	0
(United States) Ca MacGregor (United States) Cy MacGregor	6	6

Final
1	(United States) S Collins (United States) S Walsh-Pete	6^{8}	7	4
(United States) Ca MacGregor (United States) Cy MacGregor	7^{10}	5	6
