= 1987 Taipei Women's Championships – Singles =

Singles
- 1987 Taipei Women's Championships

Final
- Champion: (Australia) Anne Minter
- Runner-up: (West Germany) Claudia Porwik
- Score: 6–4, 6–1

Details
- Draw: 32 (4Q/1LL)
- Seeds: 8

Events
Singles	Doubles
← 1986 ·	Taipei Women's Championships	· 1988 →

Patricia Hy was the defending champion, but chose to focus only on the doubles tournament.

Anne Minter won the title by defeating Claudia Porwik 6–4, 6–1 in the final.

== Seeds ==
1. (United Kingdom) Sara Gomer (first round)
2. (Switzerland) Lilian Drescher (first round)
3. (Australia) Anne Minter (champion)
4. (United States) Cammy MacGregor (second round)
5. (United States) Barbara Gerken (first round)
6. (Switzerland) Christiane Jolissaint (first round)
7. (United Kingdom) Annabel Croft (first round)
8. (United States) Sharon Walsh-Pete (second round)

== Draw ==
=== Key ===
- Q = Qualifier
- WC = Wild card
- LL = Lucky loser
- Alt = Alternate
- SE = Special exempt
- PR = Protected ranking
- ITF = ITF entry
- JE = Junior exempt
- w/o = Walkover
- r = Retired
- d = Defaulted
- SR = Special ranking

=== Finals ===
Semifinals
(Argentina) Adriana Villagrán	6	3	1
3	(Australia) Anne Minter	0	6	6
(United States) Heather Ludloff	6	1	1
(West Germany) Claudia Porwik	4	6	6

Final
3	(Australia) Anne Minter	6	6
(West Germany) Claudia Porwik	4	1

=== Top half ===
First round
1	(United Kingdom) S Gomer	3	6	6
(Argentina) A Villagrán	6	2	7
(France) P Paradis	6	7
(New Zealand) J Richardson	2	6
Q	(United States) L Antonoplis	5	3
(Brazil) C Monteiro	7	6
(France) A Dechaume	6	6
6	(Switzerland) C Jolissaint	3	2
3	(Australia) A Minter	2	6	6
Q	(New Zealand) B Cordwell	6	4	4
Q	(Japan) Y Koizumi	7	6
(Chinese Taipei) Lin Shi-min	5	1
(Chinese Taipei) Lai Su-lin	1	0
(Australia) L Field	6	6
(Belgium) A Devries	6	4	6
7	(United Kingdom) A Croft	2	6	2

Second round
(Argentina) A Villagrán	7	7
(France) P Paradis	5	6
(Brazil) C Monteiro	7	2	6
(France) A Dechaume	5	6	1
3	(Australia) A Minter	7	6
Q	(Japan) Y Koizumi	6	1
(Australia) L Field	2	7	2
(Belgium) A Devries	6	6	6

Quarterfinals
(Argentina) A Villagrán	3	6	6
(Brazil) C Monteiro	6	4	1
3	(Australia) A Minter	6	6
(Belgium) A Devries	2	3

Semifinals
(Argentina) A Villagrán	6	3	1
3	(Australia) A Minter	0	6	6

=== Bottom half ===
First round
8	(United States) S Walsh-Pete	6	7
(Sweden) C Karlsson	1	5
(United States) AM Fernandez	4	6
(United States) H Ludloff	6	7
(Italy) C Nozzoli	7	6
(France) P Etchemendy	5	4
(Japan) E Okagawa	3	3
4	(United States) C MacGregor	6	6
5	(United States) B Gerken	2	6	1
(West Germany) C Porwik	6	3	6
(Australia) M Jaggard	4	4
(France) E Derly	6	6
Q	(Italy) L Golarsa	6	6
(Peru) P Vásquez	4	1
LL	(Italy) S La Fratta	5	6	6
2	(Switzerland) L Drescher	7	2	3

Second round
8	(United States) S Walsh-Pete	1	2
(United States) H Ludloff	6	6
(Italy) C Nozzoli	6	6
4	(United States) C MacGregor	4	2
(West Germany) C Porwik	3	6	7
(France) E Derly	6	1	6
Q	(Italy) L Golarsa	6	6
LL	(Italy) S La Fratta	1	2

Quarterfinals
(United States) H Ludloff	6	6
(Italy) C Nozzoli	3	4
(West Germany) C Porwik	7	6
Q	(Italy) L Golarsa	6	2

Semifinals
(United States) H Ludloff	6	1	1
(West Germany) C Porwik	4	6	6
