= 1986 Singapore Women's Open – Singles =

Singles
- 1986 Singapore Women's Open

Final
- Champion: (United States) Gigi Fernández
- Runner-up: (Argentina) Mercedes Paz
- Score: 6–4, 2–6, 6–4

Details
- Draw: 32 (4Q)
- Seeds: 8

Events
Singles	Doubles
WTA Singapore Open	· 1987 →

In the inaugural edition of the tournament, Gigi Fernández won the title by defeating Mercedes Paz 6–4, 2–6, 6–4 in the final.

== Seeds ==
1. (Canada) Helen Kelesi (quarterfinals)
2. (Argentina) Mercedes Paz (final)
3. (United States) Barbara Gerken (second round)
4. (Brazil) Niege Dias (second round)
5. (Argentina) Adriana Villagrán (second round)
6. (United States) Gigi Fernández (champion)
7. (West Germany) Isabel Cueto (first round)
8. (United States) Vicki Nelson-Dunbar (first round)

== Draw ==
=== Key ===
- Q = Qualifier
- WC = Wild card
- LL = Lucky loser
- Alt = Alternate
- SE = Special exempt
- PR = Protected ranking
- ITF = ITF entry
- JE = Junior exempt
- w/o = Walkover
- r = Retired
- d = Defaulted
- SR = Special ranking

=== Finals ===
Semifinals
6	(United States) Gigi Fernández	6	6
(Hong Kong) Patricia Hy	4	4
(Australia) Nicole Provis	4	3
2	(Argentina) Mercedes Paz	6	6

Final
6	(United States) Gigi Fernández	6	2	6
2	(Argentina) Mercedes Paz	4	6	4

=== Top half ===
First round
1	(Canada) H Kelesi	6	7
(New Zealand) B Cordwell	1	6
(Sweden) M Lundqvist	6	6	6
(United States) L Antonoplis	4	7	2
(United States) L Bernstein	2	4
Q	(Australia) L O'Neill	6	6
(Japan) E Okagawa	3	6	6
6	(United States) G Fernández	6	2	7
3	(United States) B Gerken	6	6
(Australia) A Tobin-Dingwall	0	2
(United States) AM Fernandez	2	3
(Sweden) M Lindström	6	6
(Hong Kong) P Hy	2	7	6
(Japan) M Yanagi	6	5	4
(United States) S Walsh-Pete	4	6	6
8	(United States) V Nelson-Dunbar	6	3	1

Second round
1	(Canada) H Kelesi	6	6
(Sweden) M Lundqvist	1	3
Q	(Australia) L O'Neill	3	3
6	(United States) G Fernández	6	6
3	(United States) B Gerken	2	4
(Sweden) M Lindström	6	6
(Hong Kong) P Hy	6	7
(United States) S Walsh-Pete	3	5

Quarterfinals
1	(Canada) H Kelesi	2	6
6	(United States) G Fernández	6	7
(Sweden) M Lindström	6	1	6
(Hong Kong) P Hy	3	6	7

Semifinals
6	(United States) G Fernández	6	6
(Hong Kong) P Hy	4	4

=== Bottom half ===
First round
5	(Argentina) A Villagrán	6	6
(New Zealand) J Richardson	1	2
(Japan) A Kijimuta	6	6
(Australia) L Field	2	3
(Australia) N Provis	6	6
(Sweden) H Dahlström	2	1
(Australia) R Bryant	2	1
4	(Brazil) N Dias	6	6
7	(West Germany) I Cueto	6	3	6
(Spain) A Sánchez Vicario	3	6	7
(West Germany) W Probst	6	0
Q	(Netherlands) M Bollegraf	7	6
Q	(Australia) S Leo	6	7	6
Q	(Australia) M Jaggard	7	6	3
(Argentina) B Fulco	2	3
2	(Argentina) M Paz	6	6

Second round
5	(Argentina) A Villagrán	4	3
(Japan) A Kijimuta	6	6
(Australia) N Provis	7	6
4	(Brazil) N Dias	5	4
(Spain) A Sánchez Vicario	3	5
Q	(Netherlands) M Bollegraf	6	7
Q	(Australia) S Leo	6	0	0
2	(Argentina) M Paz	5	6	6

Quarterfinals
(Japan) A Kijimuta	6	3	6
(Australia) N Provis	3	6	7
Q	(Netherlands) M Bollegraf	5	4
2	(Argentina) M Paz	7	6

Semifinals
(Australia) N Provis	4	3
2	(Argentina) M Paz	6	6
