= 1986 Taipei Women's Championships – Singles =

Singles
- 1986 Taipei Women's Championships

Final
- Champion: (Hong Kong) Patricia Hy
- Runner-up: (Argentina) Adriana Villagrán
- Score: 6–7^{(6–8)}, 6–2, 6–3

Details
- Draw: 32 (4Q)
- Seeds: 8

Events
| Singles | Doubles |
| Taipei Women's Championships | · 1987 → |

In the first edition of the tournament, Patricia Hy won the title by defeating Adriana Villagrán 6–7^{(6–8)}, 6–2, 6–3 in the final.

== Seeds ==
1. (Canada) Helen Kelesi (quarterfinals)
2. (Argentina) Mercedes Paz (second round)
3. (United States) Barbara Gerken (semifinals)
4. (Japan) Etsuko Inoue (first round)
5. (Sweden) Carina Karlsson (first round)
6. (Brazil) Niege Dias (first round)
7. (United States) Vicki Nelson-Dunbar (first round)
8. (Sweden) Helena Dahlström (second round)

== Draw ==
=== Key ===
- Q = Qualifier
- WC = Wild card
- LL = Lucky loser
- Alt = Alternate
- SE = Special exempt
- PR = Protected ranking
- ITF = ITF entry
- JE = Junior exempt
- w/o = Walkover
- r = Retired
- d = Defaulted
- SR = Special ranking

=== Finals ===
Semifinals
(Hong Kong) Patricia Hy | 6 | 6 | 6
3 | (United States) Barbara Gerken | 7 | 2 | 3
Q | (West Germany) Wiltrud Probst | 6 | 0
(Argentina) Adriana Villagrán | 7 | 6

Final
(Hong Kong) Patricia Hy | 6^{6} | 6 | 6
(Argentina) Adriana Villagrán | 7^{8} | 2 | 3

=== Top half ===
First round
1 | (Canada) H Kelesi | 6 | 6
(Argentina) B Fulco | 3 | 3
Q | (Sweden) M Lundqvist | 6 | 6
(Spain) A Sánchez Vicario | 2 | 1
(Hong Kong) P Hy | 4 | 6 | 6
(United States) L Antonoplis | 6 | 2 | 1
(Australia) N Provis | 4 | 7 | 6
6 | (Brazil) N Dias | 6 | 5 | 1
3 | (United States) B Gerken | 6 | 6
(United States) C Fernandez | 1 | 4
(Australia) A Tobin-Dingwall | w/o
(Japan) A Kijimuta
(United States) G Fernández | 6 | 6
Q | (United States) L Bernstein | 4 | 4
(Australia) L Field | 6 | 3 | 6
(West Germany) I Cueto | 4 | 6 | 3

Second round
1 | (Canada) H Kelesi | 6 | 5 | 6
Q | (Sweden) M Lundqvist | 2 | 7 | 1
(Hong Kong) P Hy | 6 | 6
(Australia) N Provis | 1 | 2
3 | (United States) B Gerken | 4 | 6 | 6
(Australia) A Tobin-Dingwall | 6 | 3 | 4
(United States) G Fernández | 6 | 6
(Australia) L Field | 4 | 1

Quarterfinals
1 | (Canada) H Kelesi | 3 | 3
(Hong Kong) P Hy | 6 | 6
3 | (United States) B Gerken | 1 | 6 | 6
(United States) G Fernández | 6 | 2 | 1

Semifinals
(Hong Kong) P Hy | 6 | 6 | 6
3 | (United States) B Gerken | 7 | 2 | 3

=== Bottom half ===
First round
7 | (United States) V Nelson-Dunbar | 4 | 3
8 | (Sweden) H Dahlström | 6 | 6
(United States) H Na | 6 | 6
(Chinese Taipei) Lin Shi-min | 2 | 2
(United States) AM Fernandez | 3 | 1
Q | (West Germany) W Probst | 6 | 6
(Japan) M Yanagi | 6 | 4 | 6
4 | (Japan) E Inoue | 2 | 6 | 4
5 | (Sweden) C Karlsson | 2 | 6 | 3
(Japan) E Okagawa | 6 | 1 | 6
(Argentina) A Villagrán | 6 | 6
(New Zealand) J Richardson | 2 | 2
(Australia) R Bryant | 4 | 5
Q | (Australia) S Leo | 6 | 7
(Sweden) M Lindström | 1 | 1
2 | (Argentina) M Paz | 6 | 6

Second round
8 | (Sweden) H Dahlström | 3 | 5
(United States) H Na | 6 | 7
Q | (West Germany) W Probst | 7 | 6
(Japan) M Yanagi | 6 | 1
(Japan) E Okagawa | 2 | 4
(Argentina) A Villagrán | 6 | 6
Q | (Australia) S Leo | 7 | 7
2 | (Argentina) M Paz | 6 | 6

Quarterfinals
(United States) H Na | 5 | 7 | 3
Q | (West Germany) W Probst | 7 | 5 | 6
(Argentina) A Villagrán | 6 | 7
Q | (Australia) S Leo | 2 | 5

Semifinals
Q | (West Germany) W Probst | 6 | 0
(Argentina) A Villagrán | 7 | 6
