= 1987 Singapore Women's Open – Singles =

Singles
- 1987 Singapore Women's Open

Final
- Champion: (Australia) Anne Minter
- Runner-up: (United States) Barbara Gerken
- Score: 6–4, 6–1

Details
- Draw: 32 (4Q)
- Seeds: 8

Events
Singles	Doubles
← 1986 ·	WTA Singapore Open	· 1988 →

Gigi Fernández was the defending champion, but did not compete this year.

Anne Minter won the title by defeating Barbara Gerken 6–4, 6–1 in the final.

== Seeds ==
1. (United Kingdom) Sara Gomer (first round)
2. (Japan) Etsuko Inoue (semifinals)
3. (Australia) Anne Minter (champion)
4. (United States) Cammy MacGregor (quarterfinals)
5. (United States) Barbara Gerken (final)
6. (United Kingdom) Annabel Croft (quarterfinals)
7. (United States) Sharon Walsh-Pete (first round)
8. (United States) Anna-Maria Fernandez (second round)

== Draw ==
=== Key ===
- Q = Qualifier
- WC = Wild card
- LL = Lucky loser
- Alt = Alternate
- SE = Special exempt
- PR = Protected ranking
- ITF = ITF entry
- JE = Junior exempt
- w/o = Walkover
- r = Retired
- d = Defaulted
- SR = Special ranking

=== Finals ===
Semifinals
(Japan) Emiko Okagawa	4	3
5	(United States) Barbara Gerken	6	6
3	(Australia) Anne Minter	2	6	6
2	(Japan) Etsuko Inoue	6	4	2

Final
5	(United States) Barbara Gerken	4	1
3	(Australia) Anne Minter	6	6

=== Top half ===
First round
1	(United Kingdom) S Gomer	6	6
(Japan) E Okagawa	7	7
(New Zealand) J Richardson	6	7	6
Q	(Indonesia) S Anggarkusuma	7	6	3
(Belgium) A Devries	6	6
(Italy) S La Fratta	2	0
(Australia) M Jaggard	6	6
7	(United States) S Walsh-Pete	2	3
4	(United States) Ca MacGregor	7	1	6
Q	(United States) L Antonoplis	5	6	4
(Australia) L Field	2	6	7
(Brazil) C Monteiro	6	4	6
(Japan) K Okamoto	6	6
(United States) H Ludloff	1	2
(Australia) L O'Neill	3	5
5	(United States) B Gerken	6	7

Second round
(Japan) E Okagawa	6	6
(New Zealand) J Richardson	2	4
(Belgium) A Devries	6	6
(Australia) M Jaggard	4	3
4	(United States) Ca MacGregor	6	5	6
(Australia) L Field	3	7	3
(Japan) K Okamoto	1	3
5	(United States) B Gerken	6	6

Quarterfinals
(Japan) E Okagawa	7	6
(Belgium) A Devries	6	2
4	(United States) Ca MacGregor	4	4
5	(United States) B Gerken	6	6

Semifinals
(Japan) E Okagawa	4	3
5	(United States) B Gerken	6	6

=== Bottom half ===
First round
6	(United Kingdom) A Croft	6	7
(France) P Paradis	2	6
(France) A Dechaume	6	6
(France) P Etchemendy	4	0
(France) E Derly	4	2
(Italy) C Nozzoli	6	6
(China) X Li	2	3
3	(Australia) A Minter	6	6
8	(United States) AM Fernandez	7	6
(Australia) A Tobin-Dingwall	5	4
(West Germany) C Porwik	2	7	6
(Italy) L Golarsa	6	5	2
Q	(Sweden) H Dahlström	6	6
Q	(United States) C Jones	3	4
(New Zealand) B Cordwell	6	4	3
2	(Japan) E Inoue	4	6	6

Second round
6	(United Kingdom) A Croft	7	6
(France) A Dechaume	6	3
(Italy) C Nozzoli	4	6	0
3	(Australia) A Minter	6	4	6
8	(United States) AM Fernandez	3	3
(West Germany) C Porwik	6	6
Q	(Sweden) H Dahlström	1	3
2	(Japan) E Inoue	6	6

Quarterfinals
6	(United Kingdom) A Croft	1	0
3	(Australia) A Minter	6	6
(West Germany) C Porwik	3	2
2	(Japan) E Inoue	6	6

Semifinals
3	(Australia) A Minter	2	6	6
2	(Japan) E Inoue	6	4	2
