= 1986 Taipei Women's Championships – Doubles =

Doubles
- 1986 Taipei Women's Championships

Final
- Champions: (United States) Lea Antonoplis (United States) Barbara Gerken
- Runners-up: (United States) Gigi Fernández (Australia) Susan Leo
- Score: 6–1, 6–2

Details
- Draw: 16
- Seeds: 4

Events
Singles	Doubles
Taipei Women's Championships	· 1987 →

In the first edition of the tournament, Lea Antonoplis and Barbara Gerken won the title by defeating Gigi Fernández and Susan Leo 6–1, 6–2 in the final.

== Seeds ==
1. (United States) Sandy Collins / (United States) Sharon Walsh-Pete (semifinals)
2. (United States) Gigi Fernández / (Australia) Susan Leo (final)
3. (Sweden) Carina Karlsson / (Sweden) Maria Lindström (first round)
4. (United States) Anna-Maria Fernandez / (New Zealand) Julie Richardson (semifinals)

== Draw ==
=== Key ===
- Q = Qualifier
- WC = Wild card
- LL = Lucky loser
- Alt = Alternate
- SE = Special exempt
- PR = Protected ranking
- ITF = ITF entry
- JE = Junior exempt
- w/o = Walkover
- r = Retired
- d = Defaulted
- SR = Special ranking

=== Draw ===
First round
1	(United States) S Collins (United States) S Walsh-Pete	6	6
(West Germany) S Hack (West Germany) W Probst	2	0
(United States) J Kaplan (Australia) A Tobin-Dingwall	4	2
(United States) H Na (Argentina) A Villagrán	6	6
3	(Sweden) C Karlsson (Sweden) M Lindström	6	5	2
(United States) L Antonoplis (United States) B Gerken	3	7	6
(Brazil) N Dias (Argentina) M Paz	6	1	4
(West Germany) P Keppeler (Netherlands) M van der Torre	3	6	6
(Australia) R Bryant (Australia) L Field	0	7	6
(Australia) L O'Neill (Australia) N Provis	6	6	2
(West Germany) I Cueto (Spain) A Sánchez Vicario	3	4
4	(United States) AM Fernandez (New Zealand) J Richardson	6	6
(Japan) E Inoue (Japan) M Yanagi	6	7
(Australia) C Carney (Australia) A Scott	3	6
(Argentina) B Fulco (United States) V Nelson-Dunbar	6	6	0
2	(United States) G Fernández (Australia) S Leo	7	4	6

Quarterfinals
1	(United States) S Collins (United States) S Walsh-Pete	6	6
(United States) H Na (Argentina) A Villagrán	2	0
(United States) L Antonoplis (United States) B Gerken	w/o
(West Germany) P Keppeler (Netherlands) M van der Torre
(Australia) R Bryant (Australia) L Field	3	6	3
4	(United States) AM Fernandez (New Zealand) J Richardson	6	4	6
(Japan) E Inoue (Japan) M Yanagi	6	6	0
2	(United States) G Fernández (Australia) S Leo	7	4	6

Semifinals
1	(United States) S Collins (United States) S Walsh-Pete	6	4	2
(United States) L Antonoplis (United States) B Gerken	4	6	6
4	(United States) AM Fernandez (New Zealand) J Richardson	7	6	4
2	(United States) G Fernández (Australia) S Leo	6	7	6

Final
(United States) L Antonoplis (United States) B Gerken	6	6
2	(United States) G Fernández (Australia) S Leo	1	2
