= 1987 Singapore Women's Open =

- Date: 27 April – 3 May
- Edition: 2nd
- Category: 1
- Draw: 32S / 16D
- Prize money: $50,000
- Surface: Hard / outdoor
- Location: Kallang, Singapore

Champions

Singles
- (Australia) Anne Minter

Doubles
- (United States) Anna-Maria Fernandez (New Zealand) Julie Richardson
← 1986 ·	WTA Singapore Open	· 1988 →

The 1987 Singapore Women's Open was a women's tennis tournament played on outdoor hard courts in Kallang, Singapore and was part of the Category 1 tier of the 1987 Virginia Slims World Championship Series. It was the second edition of the Singapore Women's Open and was held from 27 April through 3 May 1987. Third-seeded Anne Minter won the singles title.

== Finals ==
=== Singles ===
(Australia) Anne Minter defeated (United States) Barbara Gerken 6–4, 6–1

- It was Minter's 2nd singles title of the year and of her career.

=== Doubles ===
(United States) Anna-Maria Fernandez / (New Zealand) Julie Richardson defeated (United States) Barbara Gerken / (United States) Heather Ludloff 6–1, 6–4

- It was Fernandez' 2nd doubles title of the year and the 5th and last of her career. It was Richardson's 2nd doubles title of the year and the 4th of her career.
