= 1992 P&G Taiwan Women's Open – Doubles =

Doubles
- 1992 P&G Taiwan Women's Open

Final
- Champions: (Australia) Jo-Anne Faull (New Zealand) Julie Richardson
- Runners-up: (South Africa) Amanda Coetzer (United States) Cammy MacGregor
- Score: 3–6, 6–3, 6–2

Details
- Draw: 16 (1WC/1Q)
- Seeds: 4

Events
Singles	Doubles
← 1989 ·	Taipei Women's Championships	· 1993 →

Maria Lindström and Heather Ludloff, the last champions in 1989, did not compete this year.

Jo-Anne Faull and Julie Richardson won the title by defeating Amanda Coetzer and Cammy MacGregor 3–6, 6–3, 6–2 in the final.

== Seeds ==
1. (South Africa) Amanda Coetzer / (United States) Cammy MacGregor (final)
2. (Japan) Rika Hiraki / (Japan) Nana Miyagi (semifinals)
3. (n/a)
4. (United States) Shaun Stafford / (United States) Marianne Werdel (semifinals)

== Draw ==
=== Key ===
- Q = Qualifier
- WC = Wild card
- LL = Lucky loser
- Alt = Alternate
- SE = Special exempt
- PR = Protected ranking
- ITF = ITF entry
- JE = Junior exempt
- w/o = Walkover
- r = Retired
- d = Defaulted
- SR = Special ranking

=== Draw ===
First round
1	(South Africa) A Coetzer (United States) Ca MacGregor	6	6
(United States) A Grossman (United Kingdom) M Javer	1	2
(United States) D Faber (United States) E Rossides	3	4
(Japan) E Iida (Japan) M Kidowaki	6	6
4	(United States) S Stafford (United States) M Werdel	6	3	6
(Japan) M Endo (Japan) A Sugiyama	4	6	2
(Australia) J Byrne (Australia) L Field	6	6
(United States) D Graham (Chinese Taipei) S-t Wang	4	2
Q	(Romania) C Cristea (Chinese Taipei) T-t Weng	2	1
(Japan) H Nagano (Japan) K Nagatsuka	6	6
(Japan) Y Kamio (Japan) M Miyauchi	2	1
(Australia) JA Faull (New Zealand) J Richardson	6	6
WC	(Chinese Taipei) Lai Su-jen (Chinese Taipei) Lai Su-ying	2	1
(Japan) E Okagawa (Japan) T Takagi	6	6
(Australia) KA Guse (Australia) D Jones	6	0	1
2	(Japan) R Hiraki (Japan) N Miyagi	3	6	6

Quarterfinals
1	(South Africa) A Coetzer (United States) Ca MacGregor	6	6
(Japan) E Iida (Japan) M Kidowaki	2	1
4	(United States) S Stafford (United States) M Werdel	6	6
(Australia) J Byrne (Australia) L Field	2	2
(Japan) H Nagano (Japan) K Nagatsuka	7	5	2
(Australia) JA Faull (New Zealand) J Richardson	6	7	6
(Japan) E Okagawa (Japan) T Takagi	6	5	2
2	(Japan) R Hiraki (Japan) N Miyagi	4	7	6

Semifinals
1	(South Africa) A Coetzer (United States) Ca MacGregor	7	6
4	(United States) S Stafford (United States) M Werdel	5	2
(Australia) JA Faull (New Zealand) J Richardson	0	6	6
2	(Japan) R Hiraki (Japan) N Miyagi	6	4	1

Final
1	(South Africa) A Coetzer (United States) Ca MacGregor	6	3	2
(Australia) JA Faull (New Zealand) J Richardson	3	6	6
