= 1989 Taipei Women's Championships – Singles =

Singles
- 1989 Taipei Women's Championships
- 1988 Champion: (United States) Stephanie Rehe

Final
- Champion: (Australia) Anne Minter
- Runner-up: (United States) Cammy MacGregor
- Score: 6–1, 4–6, 6–2

Details
- Draw: 32
- Seeds: 8

Events
Singles	Doubles
← 1988 ·	Taipei Women's Championships	· 1992 →

The singles tournament of the 1989 Taipei Women's Championships was a 32-draw single elimination tournament.

Stephanie Rehe was the defending champion but did not compete that year.

Anne Minter won in the final 6–1, 4–6, 6–2 against Cammy MacGregor.

== Seeds ==
A champion seed is indicated in bold text while text in italics indicates the round in which that seed was eliminated.

1. (Australia) **Anne Minter (champion)**
2. (New Zealand) Belinda Cordwell (first round)
3. (United States) Ann Henricksson (first round)
4. (United States) Betsy Nagelsen (quarterfinals)
5. (United States) Beth Herr (quarterfinals)
6. (New Zealand) Julie Richardson (first round)
7. (Australia) Louise Field (second round)
8. (Belgium) Ann Devries (second round)

== Draw ==
=== Key ===
- Q = Qualifier
- WC = Wild card
- LL = Lucky loser
- Alt = Alternate
- SE = Special exempt
- PR = Protected ranking
- ITF = ITF entry
- JE = Junior exempt
- w/o = Walkover
- r = Retired
- d = Defaulted
- SR = Special ranking

First round
1	(Australia) **A Minter**	**6**	**6**
(United States) L-A Eldredge	3	0
(Australia) L O'Neill	0	3
Q	(Japan) **M Kidowaki**	**6**	**6**
(Sweden) C Dahlman	4	5
(Netherlands) **C Bakkum**	**6**	**7**
(Hong Kong) P Hy	5	1
5	(United States) **B Herr**	**7**	**6**
3	(United States) A Henricksson	4	6
(Switzerland) **E Krapl**	**6**	**7**
(United Kingdom) A Hobbs	**6**	3	4
(Australia) **M Jaggard**	4	**6**	**6**
(Australia) **E Smylie**	6	**6**	**6**
Q	(United States) A Grousbeck	**7**	2	2
(Chinese Taipei) S-T Wang	3	3
8	(Belgium) **A Devries**	**6**	**6**
7	(Australia) **L Field**	**6**	**7**
(United States) K Keil	4	6
(Japan) N Miyagi	**6**	6	4
(United States) **C MacGregor**	4	**7**	**6**
Q	(Japan) T Takagi	2	4
(Sweden) **M Lindström**	**6**	**6**
(United States) L Antonoplis	4	1
4	(United States) **B Nagelsen**	**6**	**6**
6	(New Zealand) J Richardson	2	1
(United States) **H Ludloff**	**6**	**6**
(Sweden) J Jonerup	**6**	2	1
(Japan) **Y Koizumi**	4	**6**	**6**
(Netherlands) H Witvoet	**6**	2	3
Q	(Belgium) **S Appelmans**	4	**6**	**6**
(Japan) **M Yanagi**	**4**
2	(New Zealand) B Cordwell	3	r

Second round
1	(Australia) **A Minter**	**7**	**6**
Q	(Japan) M Kidowaki	6	1
(Netherlands) C Bakkum	4	0
5	(United States) **B Herr**	**6**	**6**
(Switzerland) **E Krapl**	**6**	**6**
(Australia) M Jaggard	3	4
(Australia) **E Smylie**	**7**	4	**6**
8	(Belgium) A Devries	5	**6**	3
7	(Australia) L Field	3	0
(United States) **C MacGregor**	**6**	**6**
(Sweden) M Lindström	**6**	3	3
4	(United States) **B Nagelsen**	3	**6**	**6**
(United States) **H Ludloff**	**7**	**6**
(Japan) Y Koizumi	5	4
Q	(Belgium) **S Appelmans**	**6**	**6**
(Japan) M Yanagi	1	3

Quarterfinals
1	(Australia) **A Minter**	**6**	**6**
5	(United States) B Herr	4	2
(Switzerland) **E Krapl**	**6**	1	**6**
(Australia) E Smylie	3	**6**	4
(United States) **C MacGregor**	**7**	3	**6**
4	(United States) B Nagelsen	5	**6**	1
(United States) **H Ludloff**	**6**	3	**7**
Q	(Belgium) S Appelmans	4	**6**	6

Semifinals
1	(Australia) **A Minter**	**7**	**6**
(Switzerland) E Krapl	5	1
(United States) **C MacGregor**	**6**	**7**
(United States) H Ludloff	1	5

Final
1	(Australia) **Anne Minter**	**6**	4	**6**
(United States) Cammy MacGregor	1	**6**	2
