= 1987 Singapore Women's Open – Doubles =

Doubles
- 1987 Singapore Women's Open

Final
- Champions: (United States) Anna-Maria Fernandez (New Zealand) Julie Richardson
- Runners-up: (United States) Barbara Gerken (United States) Heather Ludloff
- Score: 6–1, 6–4

Details
- Draw: 16
- Seeds: 4

Events
Singles	Doubles
← 1986 ·	WTA Singapore Open	· 1988 →

Anna-Maria Fernandez and Julie Richardson successfully defended their title, by defeating Barbara Gerken and Heather Ludloff 6–1, 6–4 in the final.

== Seeds ==
1. (United States) Sandy Collins / (United States) Sharon Walsh-Pete (semifinals)
2. (United States) Barbara Gerken / (United States) Heather Ludloff (final)
3. (United States) Cammy MacGregor / (United States) Cynthia MacGregor (quarterfinals)
4. (New Zealand) Belinda Cordwell / (Australia) Louise Field (first round)

== Draw ==
=== Key ===
- Q = Qualifier
- WC = Wild card
- LL = Lucky loser
- Alt = Alternate
- SE = Special exempt
- PR = Protected ranking
- ITF = ITF entry
- JE = Junior exempt
- w/o = Walkover
- r = Retired
- d = Defaulted
- SR = Special ranking

=== Draw ===
First round
1	(United States) S Collins (United States) S Walsh-Pete	5	6	7
(United States) J Goodling (United States) W Wood	7	3	6
(Australia) A Tobin-Dingwall (Australia) L O'Neill	3	3
3	(United States) Ca MacGregor (United States) Cy MacGregor	6	6
(United States) AM Fernandez (New Zealand) J Richardson	7	6
(Netherlands) C Bakkum (United Kingdom) S Gomer	5	3
(Indonesia) S Anggarkusuma (Philippines) D Castillejo	7	2	1
(Italy) L Golarsa (Italy) S La Fratta	5	6	6
(United States) L Antonoplis (Brazil) C Monteiro	3	6	7
(France) A Dechaume (France) E Derly	6	3	5
(United Kingdom) A Croft (Belgium) A Devries	6	7
4	(New Zealand) B Cordwell (Australia) L Field	1	6
(Australia) M Jaggard (Australia) A Minter	6	6
(France) P Paradis (France) Nathalie Phan-Thanh	2	4
(Japan) K Okamoto (Japan) N Sato	1	2
2	(United States) B Gerken (United States) H Ludloff	6	6

Quarterfinals
1	(United States) S Collins (United States) S Walsh-Pete	7	6
3	(United States) Ca MacGregor (United States) Cy MacGregor	5	1
(United States) AM Fernandez (New Zealand) J Richardson	6	7
(Italy) L Golarsa (Italy) S La Fratta	4	5
(United States) L Antonoplis (Brazil) C Monteiro	6	6
(United Kingdom) A Croft (Belgium) A Devries	0	2
(Australia) M Jaggard (Australia) A Minter	6	6
2	(United States) B Gerken (United States) H Ludloff	7	7

Semifinals
1	(United States) S Collins (United States) S Walsh-Pete	6	4	4
(United States) AM Fernandez (New Zealand) J Richardson	2	6	6
(United States) L Antonoplis (Brazil) C Monteiro	4	4
2	(United States) B Gerken (United States) H Ludloff	6	6

Final
(United States) AM Fernandez (New Zealand) J Richardson	6	6
2	(United States) B Gerken (United States) H Ludloff	1	4
