= 1992 P&G Taiwan Women's Open – Singles =

Singles
- 1992 P&G Taiwan Women's Open

Final
- Champion: (United States) Shaun Stafford
- Runner-up: (United States) Ann Grossman
- Score: 6–1, 6–3

Details
- Draw: 32 (1WC/4Q)
- Seeds: 8

Events
Singles	Doubles
← 1989 ·	Taipei Women's Championships	· 1993 →

Anne Minter, the last champion in 1989, did not compete this year.

Shaun Stafford won the title by defeating Ann Grossman 6–1, 6–3 in the final.

== Seeds ==
1. (South Africa) Amanda Coetzer (semifinals)
2. (United States) Ann Grossman (final)
3. (United States) Robin White (first round)
4. (United Kingdom) Monique Javer (first round)
5. (Japan) Mana Endo (second round)
6. (United States) Debbie Graham (quarterfinals)
7. (United States) Marianne Werdel (quarterfinals)
8. (Chinese Taipei) Wang Shi-ting (quarterfinals)

== Draw ==
=== Key ===
- Q = Qualifier
- WC = Wild card
- LL = Lucky loser
- Alt = Alternate
- SE = Special exempt
- PR = Protected ranking
- ITF = ITF entry
- JE = Junior exempt
- w/o = Walkover
- r = Retired
- d = Defaulted
- SR = Special ranking

=== Finals ===
Semifinals
1	(South Africa) Amanda Coetzer	1	3
(United States) Shaun Stafford	6	6
(Japan) Nana Miyagi	2	0
2	(United States) Ann Grossman	6	6

Final
(United States) Shaun Stafford	6	6
2	(United States) Ann Grossman	1	3

=== Top half ===
First round
1	(South Africa) A Coetzer	6	7
Q	(Romania) C Cristea	2	6
(United States) Ca MacGregor	6	6
(Japan) E Iida	4	0
(Japan) M Kidowaki	6	6
Q	(Japan) E Okagawa	1	4
(New Zealand) J Richardson	2	6
6	(United States) D Graham	6	7
4	(United Kingdom) M Javer	6	2
(United States) S Stafford	7	6
(Japan) T Takagi	2	3
(United States) S McCarthy	6	6
Q	(Japan) Kiyoko Yazawa	2	2
Q	(United States) S Collins	6	6
(Japan) H Nagano	6	2	1
7	(United States) M Werdel	3	6	6

Second round
1	(South Africa) A Coetzer	6	7
(United States) Ca MacGregor	4	5
(Japan) M Kidowaki	5	2
6	(United States) D Graham	7	6
(United States) S Stafford	6	6	6
(United States) S McCarthy	7	2	1
Q	(United States) S Collins	3	1
7	(United States) M Werdel	6	6

Quarterfinals
1	(South Africa) A Coetzer	6	7
6	(United States) D Graham	3	5
(United States) S Stafford	6	3	6
7	(United States) M Werdel	1	6	4

Semifinals
1	(South Africa) A Coetzer	1	3
(United States) S Stafford	6	6

=== Bottom half ===
First round
5	(Japan) M Endo	6	6
(Japan) M Miyauchi	1	1
(Japan) K Nagatsuka	6	2	3
(Australia) L Field	2	6	6
(Australia) J Byrne	2	6	6
(United States) D Faber	6	4	0
(Japan) N Miyagi	3	6	6
3	(United States) R White	6	3	0
8	(Chinese Taipei) S-t Wang	6	6
(Japan) A Sugiyama	1	3
WC	(Chinese Taipei) Lai Su-jen	6	4	6
(Australia) JA Faull	3	6	4
(Australia) KA Guse	2	2
(United States) E Rossides	6	6
(Japan) Y Kamio	1	0
2	(United States) A Grossman	6	6

Second round
5	(Japan) M Endo	6	3	2
(Australia) L Field	4	6	6
(Australia) J Byrne	2	7	6
(Japan) N Miyagi	6	5	7
8	(Chinese Taipei) S-t Wang	6	6
WC	(Chinese Taipei) Lai Su-jen	1	1
(United States) E Rossides	6	3
2	(United States) A Grossman	7	6

Quarterfinals
(Australia) L Field	2	5
(Japan) N Miyagi	6	7
8	(Chinese Taipei) S-t Wang	6	4	3
2	(United States) A Grossman	3	6	6

Semifinals
(Japan) N Miyagi	2	0
2	(United States) A Grossman	6	6
