= 1986 Singapore Women's Open – Doubles =

Doubles
- 1986 Singapore Women's Open

Final
- Champions: (United States) Anna-Maria Fernandez (New Zealand) Julie Richardson
- Runners-up: (United States) Sandy Collins (United States) Sharon Walsh-Pete
- Score: 6–3, 6–2

Details
- Draw: 16
- Seeds: 4

Events
Singles	Doubles
WTA Singapore Open	· 1987 →

In the inaugural edition of the tournament, Anna-Maria Fernandez and Julie Richardson won the title by defeating Sandy Collins and Sharon Walsh-Pete 6–3, 6–2 in the final.

== Seeds ==
1. (United States) Sandy Collins / (United States) Sharon Walsh-Pete (final)
2. (United States) Lea Antonoplis / (United States) Barbara Gerken (semifinals)
3. (United States) Anna-Maria Fernandez / (New Zealand) Julie Richardson (champions)
4. (Australia) Louise Field / (Argentina) Mercedes Paz (semifinals)

== Draw ==
=== Key ===
- Q = Qualifier
- WC = Wild card
- LL = Lucky loser
- Alt = Alternate
- SE = Special exempt
- PR = Protected ranking
- ITF = ITF entry
- JE = Junior exempt
- w/o = Walkover
- r = Retired
- d = Defaulted
- SR = Special ranking

=== Draw ===
First round
1	(United States) S Collins (United States) S Walsh-Pete	2	6	6
(Netherlands) M Bollegraf (Netherlands) N Jagerman	6	4	1
(Japan) N Sato (United States) K Steinmetz	6	2	5
(New Zealand) B Cordwell (Brazil) N Dias	3	6	7
4	(Australia) L Field (Argentina) M Paz	6	6	7
(United States) J Kaplan (Australia) A Tobin-Dingwall	3	7	6
(Australia) L O'Neill (Australia) N Provis	3	6	4
(Argentina) B Fulco (Canada) H Kelesi	6	3	6
(Australia) C Carney (Australia) A Scott	6	3	3
(Australia) S Leo (Australia) P Whytcross	2	6	6
(West Germany) I Cueto (Spain) A Sánchez Vicario	3	0
3	(United States) AM Fernandez (New Zealand) J Richardson	6	6
(Hong Kong) P Hy (Japan) M Yanagi	3	6	3
(Sweden) M Lindström (Argentina) A Villagrán	6	4	6
(Australia) R Bryant (Australia) M Jaggard	3	3
2	(United States) L Antonoplis (United States) B Gerken	6	6

Quarterfinals
1	(United States) S Collins (United States) S Walsh-Pete	6	4	7
(New Zealand) B Cordwell (Brazil) N Dias	4	6	6
4	(Australia) L Field (Argentina) M Paz	6	6
(Argentina) B Fulco (Canada) H Kelesi	1	1
(Australia) S Leo (Australia) P Whytcross	1	5
3	(United States) AM Fernandez (New Zealand) J Richardson	6	7
(Sweden) M Lindström (Argentina) A Villagrán	3	5
2	(United States) L Antonoplis (United States) B Gerken	6	7

Semifinals
1	(United States) S Collins (United States) S Walsh-Pete	6	6
4	(Australia) L Field (Argentina) M Paz	3	4
3	(United States) AM Fernandez (New Zealand) J Richardson	4	6	7
2	(United States) L Antonoplis (United States) B Gerken	6	2	6

Final
1	(United States) S Collins (United States) S Walsh-Pete	3	2
3	(United States) AM Fernandez (New Zealand) J Richardson	6	6
