= 1989 Taipei Women's Championships – Doubles =

Doubles
- 1989 Taipei Women's Championships
- 1988 Champions: (United States) Patty Fendick (United States) Ann Henricksson

Final
- Champions: (Sweden) Maria Lindström (United States) Heather Ludloff
- Runners-up: (Sweden) Cecilia Dahlman (Japan) Nana Miyagi
- Score: 4–6, 7–5, 6–3

Events
Singles	Doubles
← 1988 ·	Taipei Women's Championships	· 1992 →

Patty Fendick and Ann Henricksson were the defending doubles tennis champions at the 1989 Taipei Women's Championships, but only Henricksson competed that year, with Beth Herr. They lost in the first round to Cecilia Dahlman and Nana Miyagi.

Maria Lindström and Heather Ludloff won the final 4–6, 7–5, 6–3 against Dahlman and Miyagi.

== Seeds ==
Champion seeds are indicated in bold text while text in italics indicates the round in which those seeds were eliminated.

1. (United States) Ann Henricksson / (United States) Beth Herr (first round)
2. (United States) Lea Antonoplis / (United States) Cammy MacGregor (semifinals)
3. n/a
4. (Sweden) **Maria Lindström** / (United States) **Heather Ludloff (champions)**

== Draw ==
=== Key ===
- Q = Qualifier
- WC = Wild card
- LL = Lucky loser
- Alt = Alternate
- SE = Special exempt
- PR = Protected ranking
- ITF = ITF entry
- JE = Junior exempt
- w/o = Walkover
- r = Retired
- d = Defaulted
- SR = Special ranking

First round
1	(United States) A Henricksson (United States) B Herr	4	5
(Sweden) **C Dahlman** (Japan) **N Miyagi**	**6**	**7**
(Australia) **T Morton** (Australia) **L O'Neill**	**6**	**6**
(South Africa) R Gaddie (South Africa) T Gaddie	4	4
LL	(Switzerland) E Krapl (Switzerland) M Strebel	1	6
(United States) **K Keil** (Japan) **M Yanagi**	**6**	**7**
(Japan) **E Okagawa** (Japan) **T Takagi**	**6**	2	**7**
(United States) J Golder (United States) S Norris	4	**6**	5
(Sweden) J Jonerup (Hong Kong) P Moreno	3	4
(Japan) **M Kidowaki** (Japan) **N Sato**	**6**	**6**
(United States) A Grousbeck (Brazil) T Zambrzycki	3	2
4	(Sweden) **M Lindström** (United States) **H Ludloff**	**6**	**6**
(Japan) Y Koizumi (Japan) M Mizokuchi	4	4
(United Kingdom) **A Hobbs** (New Zealand) **J Richardson**	**6**	**6**
(Hong Kong) P Hy (Chinese Taipei) S-T Wang	2	**6**	6
2	(United States) **L Antonoplis** (United States) **C MacGregor**	**6**	4	**7**

Quarterfinals
(Sweden) **C Dahlman** (Japan) **N Miyagi**	**6**	**6**
(Australia) T Morton (Australia) L O'Neill	4	2
(United States) K Keil (Japan) M Yanagi	6	1
(Japan) **E Okagawa** (Japan) **T Takagi**	**7**	**6**
(Japan) M Kidowaki (Japan) N Sato	1	2
4	(Sweden) **M Lindström** (United States) **H Ludloff**	**6**	**6**
(United Kingdom) A Hobbs (New Zealand) J Richardson	**7**	2	4
2	(United States) **L Antonoplis** (United States) **C MacGregor**	6	**6**	**6**

Semifinals
(Sweden) **C Dahlman** (Japan) **N Miyagi**	**6**	**6**
(Japan) E Okagawa (Japan) T Takagi	3	1
4	(Sweden) **M Lindström** (United States) **H Ludloff**	5	**6**	**7**
2	(United States) L Antonoplis (United States) C MacGregor	**7**	1	5

Final
(Sweden) Cecilia Dahlman (Japan) Nana Miyagi	**6**	5	3
4	(Sweden) **Maria Lindström** (United States) **Heather Ludloff**	4	**7**	**6**
