= 1986 Singapore Women's Open =

- Date: 20–26 October
- Edition: 1st
- Category: 1
- Draw: 32S / 16D
- Prize money: $50,000
- Surface: Hard / indoor
- Location: Singapore

Champions

Singles
- (United States) Gigi Fernández

Doubles
- (United States) Anna-Maria Fernandez (Australia) Julie Richardson
WTA Singapore Open	· 1987 →

The 1986 Singapore Women's Open was a women's tennis tournament played on indoor hard courts in Singapore and was part of the Category 1 tier of the 1986 Virginia Slims World Championship Series. It was the inaugural edition of the Singapore Women's Open and was held from 20 October through 26 October 1986. Sixth-seeded Gigi Fernández won the singles title.

== Finals ==
=== Singles ===
(United States) Gigi Fernández defeated (Argentina) Mercedes Paz 6–4, 2–6, 6–4

- It was Fernández' first singles title of her career.

=== Doubles ===
(United States) Anna-Maria Fernandez / (Australia) Julie Richardson defeated (United States) Sandy Collins / (United States) Sharon Walsh-Pete 6–3, 6–2

- It was Fernandez' 1st doubles title of the year and the 3rd of her career. It was Richardson's 1st doubles title of the year and the 2nd of her career.
