= 1989 Taipei Women's Championships =

- Date: 24–30 April
- Edition: 4th
- Category: Category 1
- Draw: 32S / 16D
- Prize money: $50,000
- Surface: Hard / outdoor
- Location: Taipei, Taiwan

Champions

Singles
- (Australia) Anne Minter

Doubles
- (Sweden) Maria Lindström / (United States) Heather Ludloff
← 1988 ·	Taipei Women's Championships	· 1992 →

The 1989 Taipei Women's Championships was a women's tennis tournament played on outdoor hard courts in Taipei, Taiwan that was part of the Category 1 tier of the 1989 WTA Tour. It was the fourth edition of the tournament and was held from 24 April through 30 April 1989. First-seeded Anne Minter won the singles title.

== Finals ==
=== Singles ===
(Australia) Anne Minter defeated (United States) Cammy MacGregor 6–1, 4–6, 6–2

- It was Minter's only singles title of the year and the 4th and last of her career.

=== Doubles ===
(Sweden) Maria Lindström / (United States) Heather Ludloff defeated (Sweden) Cecilia Dahlman / (Japan) Nana Miyagi 4–6, 7–5, 6–3

- It was Lindstrom's first doubles title of her career. It was Ludloff's only doubles title of the year and the 2nd of her career.

== See also ==
- List of sporting events in Taiwan
