= 1988 Taipei Women's Championships – Singles =

Singles
- 1988 Taipei Women's Championships
- 1987 Champion: (Australia) Anne Minter

Final
- Champion: (United States) Stephanie Rehe
- Runner-up: (Netherlands) Brenda Schultz
- Score: 6–4, 6–4

Details
- Draw: 27
- Seeds: 8

Events
Singles	Doubles
← 1987 ·	Taipei Women's Championships	· 1989 →

The singles tournament for the 1988 Taipei Women's Championships was a 32-draw with qualifiers.

Anne Minter was the defending champion but did not compete that year.

Stephanie Rehe won in the final 6–4, 6–4 against Brenda Schultz.

== Seeds ==
A champion seed is indicated in bold text while text in italics indicates the round in which that seed was eliminated. The top five seeds received a bye to the second round.

1. (Sweden) Catarina Lindqvist (semifinals)
2. (United States) Patty Fendick (semifinals)
3. (United States) **Stephanie Rehe (champion)**
4. (Netherlands) Brenda Schultz (final)
5. (Australia) Elizabeth Smylie (second round)
6. (Netherlands) Hester Witvoet (second round)
7. (New Zealand) Belinda Cordwell (quarterfinals)
8. (West Germany) Silke Meier (first round)

== Draw ==
=== Key ===
- Q = Qualifier
- WC = Wild card
- LL = Lucky loser
- Alt = Alternate
- SE = Special exempt
- PR = Protected ranking
- ITF = ITF entry
- JE = Junior exempt
- w/o = Walkover
- r = Retired
- d = Defaulted
- SR = Special ranking

=== Final ===
Final
3	(United States) **Stephanie Rehe**	**6**	**6**
4	(Netherlands) Brenda Schultz	4	4

=== Section 1 ===
First round
(Chinese Taipei) S-T Wang	0	3
(United States) **M Werdel**	**6**	**6**
(United Kingdom) L Pennington	6	2
(Sweden) **J Jonerup**	**7**	**6**
(West Germany) **P Wallenfels**	**w/o**
(Hong Kong) P Hy
(Japan) **Y Koizumi**	**6**	**6**
(Japan) E Iida	4	0
(New Zealand) J Richardson	2	6
7	(New Zealand) **B Cordwell**	**6**	**7**

Second round
1	(Sweden) **C Lindqvist**	**6**	**6**
(United States) M Werdel	3	0
(Sweden) **J Jonerup**	**w/o**
5	(Australia) E Smylie
3	(United States) **S Rehe**	**6**	**6**
(West Germany) P Wallenfels	4	4
(Japan) Y Koizumi	3	2
7	(New Zealand) **B Cordwell**	**6**	**6**

Quarterfinals
1	(Sweden) **C Lindqvist**	**7**	**6**
(Sweden) J Jonerup	5	2
3	(United States) **S Rehe**	4	**6**	**6**
7	(New Zealand) B Cordwell	**6**	0	4

Semifinals
1	(Sweden) C Lindqvist	**6**	4	1
3	(United States) **S Rehe**	2	**6**	**6**

=== Section 2 ===
First round
6	(Netherlands) **H Witvoet**	**6**	**6**
(Japan) R Hiraki	1	1
(United States) **A Henricksson**	**6**	**6**
(Canada) M Drake	4	2
(United States) **L Bartlett**	**6**	**7**
(United States) J Golder	0	6
8	(West Germany) S Meier	2	5
(United States) **S Sloane**	**6**	**7**
(United States) **B Nagelsen**	**7**	**7**
(United States) S Savides	6	6
(Japan) **M Mizokuchi**	**6**	**6**
(Chinese Taipei) S-M Lin	0	2

Second round
6	(Netherlands) H Witvoet	5	5
(United States) **A Henricksson**	**7**	**7**
(United States) L Bartlett	6	**6**	6
4	(Netherlands) **B Schultz**	**7**	0	**7**
(United States) S Sloane	4	2
(United States) **B Nagelsen**	**6**	**6**
(Japan) M Mizokuchi	4	2
2	(United States) **P Fendick**	**6**	**6**

Quarterfinals
(United States) A Henricksson	2	5
4	(Netherlands) **B Schultz**	**6**	**7**
(United States) B Nagelsen	4	6
2	(United States) **P Fendick**	**6**	**7**

Semifinals
4	(Netherlands) **B Schultz**	**6**	**6**
2	(United States) P Fendick	2	4
