= 1993 P&G Taiwan Women's Tennis Open – Doubles =

Doubles
- 1993 P&G Taiwan Women's Tennis Open

Final
- Champions: (Indonesia) Yayuk Basuki; (Japan) Nana Miyagi
- Runners-up: (Australia) Jo-Anne Faull; (Australia) Kristine Radford
- Score: 6–4, 6–2

Events
Singles	Doubles
← 1992 ·	Taipei Women's Championships	· 1994 →

Jo-Anne Faull and Julie Richardson were the defending champions, but Richardson did not compete this year.

Faull teamed up with Jo-Anne Faull and lost in the final 6–4, 6–2 against Yayuk Basuki and Nana Miyagi.

== Draw ==
=== Key ===
- Q = Qualifier
- WC = Wild card
- LL = Lucky loser
- Alt = Alternate
- SE = Special exempt
- PR = Protected ranking
- ITF = ITF entry
- JE = Junior exempt
- w/o = Walkover
- r = Retired
- d = Defaulted
- SR = Special ranking

=== Draw ===
First round

Quarterfinals

Semifinals

Final

(Germany) K Kschwendt
(Australia) R McQuillan
4
6
6

- (France) N van Lottum
- (Netherlands) C Wegink
6
2
2

(Germany) K Kschwendt
(Australia) R McQuillan
6
7

- (Japan) E Iida
- (Japan) M Kidowaki
3
2

- (Australia) N Pratt
- (South Africa) T Price
4
6

(Australia) N Pratt
(South Africa) T Price
6
6

- (Germany) K Kschwendt
- (Australia) R McQuillan
6
4
3

(Australia) JA Faull
(Australia) K Radford
6
6

(Australia) JA Faull
(Australia) K Radford
4
6
6

- (Romania) C Cristea
- (Japan) H Nagano
1
3

(Australia) JA Faull
(Australia) K Radford
6
6

(Australia) K Godridge
(Australia) K Sharpe
6
6

- (Australia) K Godridge
- (Australia) K Sharpe
4
3

- (Japan) M Miyauchi
- (Indonesia) J Sutedja
3
2

- (Australia) JA Faull
- (Australia) K Radford
4
2

- (United States) J Chi
- (Chinese Taipei) S-t Wang
3
0

(Indonesia) Y Basuki
(Japan) N Miyagi
6
6

(South Korea) S-h Park
(Indonesia) R Tedjakusuma
6
6

- (South Korea) S-h Park
- (Indonesia) R Tedjakusuma
2
5

- (United States) A deLone
- (United States) E deLone
4
2

(Indonesia) Y Basuki
(Japan) N Miyagi
6
7

(Indonesia) Y Basuki
(Japan) N Miyagi
6
6

(Indonesia) Y Basuki
(Japan) N Miyagi
4
6
6

- (Czech Republic) E Švíglerová
- (Australia) D Thomas
2
2

- (United States) C MacGregor
- (United States) S Stafford
6
4
3

(Australia) D Jones
(United States) A Keller
6
6

- (Australia) D Jones
- (United States) A Keller
2
3

- (Australia) KA Guse
- (Australia) A Woolcock
2
7
5

(United States) C MacGregor
(United States) S Stafford
6
6

(United States) C MacGregor
(United States) S Stafford
6
6
7
