= 1986 Taipei Women's Championships =

- Date: 6–12 October
- Edition: 1st
- Draw: 27S / 16D
- Prize money: $50,000
- Surface: Carpet / indoor
- Location: Taipei, Taiwan

Champions

Singles
- (Hong Kong) Patricia Hy

Doubles
- (United States) Lea Antonoplis / (United States) Barbara Gerken
Taipei Women's Championships	· 1987 →

The 1986 Taipei Women's Championships was a women's tennis tournament played on indoor carpet courts in Taipei, Taiwan and was part of the 1986 Virginia Slims World Championship Series. It was the inaugural edition of the tournament and was held from 6 October through 12 October 1986. Unseeded Patricia Hy won the singles title.

== Finals ==
=== Singles ===
(Hong Kong) Patricia Hy defeated (Argentina) Adriana Villagrán 6–7^{(6–8)}, 6–2, 6–3

- It was Hy's only singles title of her career.

=== Doubles ===
(United States) Lea Antonoplis / (United States) Barbara Gerken defeated (United States) Gigi Fernández / (Australia) Susan Leo 6–1, 6–2

- It was Antonoplis' 1st doubles title of the year and the 3rd of her career. It was Gerken's only doubles title of her career.

== See also ==
- List of sporting events in Taiwan
