= 1988 Taipei Women's Championships =

- Date: 18–24 April
- Edition: 3rd
- Category: 1
- Draw: 27S / 10D
- Prize money: $50,000
- Surface: Carpet / indoor
- Location: Taipei, Taiwan

Champions

Singles
- (United States) Stephanie Rehe

Doubles
- (United States) Patty Fendick / (United States) Ann Henricksson
← 1987 ·	Taipei Women's Championships	· 1989 →

The 1988 Taipei Women's Championships was a women's tennis tournament played on indoor carpet courts in Taipei, Taiwan and was part of the Category 1 tier of the 1988 Virginia Slims World Championship Series. It was the third edition of the tournament and was held from April 18th through April 24th 1988. Third-seeded Stephanie Rehe won the singles title.

== Finals ==
=== Singles ===
(United States) Stephanie Rehe defeated (Netherlands) Brenda Schultz 6–4, 6–4

- It was Rehe's 1st singles title of the year and the 4th of her career.

=== Doubles ===
(United States) Patty Fendick / (United States) Ann Henricksson defeated (New Zealand) Belinda Cordwell / (New Zealand) Julie Richardson 6–2, 2–6, 6–2

- It was Fendick's 5th title of the year and the 5th of her career. It was Henricksson's 2nd title of the year and the 2nd of her career.

== See also ==
- List of sporting events in Taiwan
