= 1988 Taipei Women's Championships – Doubles =

Doubles
- 1988 Taipei Women's Championships
- 1987 Champion: (United States) Cammy MacGregor (United States) Cynthia MacGregor

Final
- Champion: (United States) Patty Fendick (United States) Ann Henricksson
- Runner-up: (New Zealand) Belinda Cordwell (New Zealand) Julie Richardson
- Score: 6–2, 2–6, 6–2

Details
- Draw: 10
- Seeds: 4

Events
Singles	Doubles
← 1987 ·	Taipei Women's Championships	· 1989 →

The doubles tennis tournament for the 1988 Taipei Women's Championships was a 16-team single-elimination tournament.

Cammy MacGregor and Cynthia MacGregor were the defending champions but did not compete that year.

Patty Fendick and Ann Henricksson won in the final 6–2, 2–6, 6–2 against Belinda Cordwell and Julie Richardson.

== Seeds ==
Champion seeds are indicated in bold text while text in italics indicates the round in which those seeds were eliminated. All four seeded teams received byes into the quarterfinals.

1. (United States) **Patty Fendick** / (United States) **Ann Henricksson (champions)**
2. (Hong Kong) Patricia Hy / (Sweden) Catarina Lindqvist (quarterfinals)
3. (United States) Stephanie Rehe / (Australia) Elizabeth Smylie (quarterfinals)
4. (New Zealand) Belinda Cordwell / (New Zealand) Julie Richardson (final)

== Draw ==
=== Key ===
- Q = Qualifier
- WC = Wild card
- LL = Lucky loser
- Alt = Alternate
- SE = Special exempt
- PR = Protected ranking
- ITF = ITF entry
- JE = Junior exempt
- w/o = Walkover
- r = Retired
- d = Defaulted
- SR = Special ranking

First round
(Canada) **M Drake** (United States) **J Golder**	**6**	**6**
(Chinese Taipei) S-M Lin (Chinese Taipei) S-T Wang	4	3
(West Germany) S Meier (United States) M Werdel
(United States) **S Sloane** (West Germany) **P Wallenfels**	**w/o**

Quarterfinals
1	(United States) **P Fendick** (United States) **A Henricksson**	**6**	**6**
(Canada) M Drake (United States) J Golder	0	1
3	(United States) S Rehe (Australia) E Smylie
(United States) **L Bartlett** (United States) **S Savides**	**w/o**
(United States) S Sloane (West Germany) P Wallenfels	1	1
4	(New Zealand) **B Cordwell** (New Zealand) **J Richardson**	**6**	**6**
(Japan) **Y Koizumi** (Japan) **M Mizokuchi**	**w/o**
2	(Hong Kong) P Hy (Sweden) C Lindqvist

Semifinals
1	(United States) **P Fendick** (United States) **A Henricksson**	**6**	**6**
(United States) L Bartlett (United States) S Savides	3	1
4	(New Zealand) **B Cordwell** (New Zealand) **J Richardson**	**6**	**6**
(Japan) Y Koizumi (Japan) M Mizokuchi	2	3

Final
1	(United States) **Patty Fendick** (United States) **Ann Henricksson**	**6**	2	**6**
4	(New Zealand) Belinda Cordwell (New Zealand) Julie Richardson	2	**6**	2
