= 1994 P&G Taiwan Women's Tennis Open – Singles =

Singles
- 1994 P&G Taiwan Women's Tennis Open

Final
- Champion: (Chinese Taipei) Wang Shi-ting
- Runner-up: (Japan) Kyōko Nagatsuka
- Score: 6–1, 6–3

Details
- Draw: 32 (2WC/4Q/3LL)
- Seeds: 8

Events
Singles	Doubles
← 1993 ·	Taipei Women's Championships

Wang Shi-ting was the defending champion and successfully defended her title, by defeating Kyōko Nagatsuka 6–1, 6–3 in the final.

== Seeds ==
1. (Chinese Taipei) Wang Shi-ting (champion)
2. (Japan) Nana Miyagi (quarterfinals)
3. (France) Alexandra Fusai (first round)
4. (Japan) Kyōko Nagatsuka (final)
5. (Germany) Veronika Martinek (second round)
6. (Japan) Yone Kamio (semifinals)
7. (Austria) Barbara Schett (first round)
8. (Czech Republic) Radka Bobková (quarterfinals)

== Draw ==
=== Key ===
- Q = Qualifier
- WC = Wild card
- LL = Lucky loser
- Alt = Alternate
- SE = Special exempt
- PR = Protected ranking
- ITF = ITF entry
- JE = Junior exempt
- w/o = Walkover
- r = Retired
- d = Defaulted
- SR = Special ranking

=== Finals ===
Semifinals
1	(Chinese Taipei) Wang Shi-ting	7^{7}	6
(Italy) Rita Grande	6^{5}	2
4	(Japan) Kyōko Nagatsuka	2	7	6
6	(Japan) Yone Kamio	6	5	3

Final
1	(Chinese Taipei) Wang Shi-ting	6	6
4	(Japan) Kyōko Nagatsuka	1	3

=== Top half ===
First round
1	(Chinese Taipei) S-t Wang	6	6
(Germany) M Živec-Škulj	3	1
(Japan) M Miyauchi	0	1
Q	(Austria) M Schnell	6	6
Q	(Japan) H Nagano	2	2
(United States) J Watanabe	6	6
(Japan) N Kijimuta	6	6
7	(Austria) B Schett	1	1
3	(France) A Fusai	5	4
Q	(Australia) KA Guse	7	6
(Czech Republic) L Richterová	0	1
(Italy) R Grande	6	6
(Germany) P Winzenhöller	3	1
(Austria) B Paulus	6	6
Q	(Czech Republic) P Rajzlová	2	3
8	(Czech Republic) R Bobková	6	6

Second round
1	(Chinese Taipei) S-t Wang	6	6
Q	(Austria) M Schnell	2	1
(United States) J Watanabe	7	6
(Japan) N Kijimuta	6	1
Q	(Australia) KA Guse	4	3
(Italy) R Grande	6	6
(Austria) B Paulus	1	4
8	(Czech Republic) R Bobková	6	6

Quarterfinals
1	(Chinese Taipei) S-t Wang	6	6	6
(United States) J Watanabe	7	3	0
(Italy) R Grande	6	6
8	(Czech Republic) R Bobková	3	4

Semifinals
1	(Chinese Taipei) S-t Wang	7	6
(Italy) R Grande	6	2

=== Bottom half ===
First round
5	(Germany) V Martinek	7	6
(Belgium) N Feber	6	2
(Belgium) D Monami	6	6
WC	(Chinese Taipei) Fan-Chiang Yu-min	3	4
LL	(Australia) D Jones	3	3
(Slovakia) K Studeníková	6	6
LL	(Chinese Taipei) Liu Yu-hsien	1	1
4	(Japan) K Nagatsuka	6	6
6	(Japan) Y Kamio	6	6
(Canada) R Simpson-Alter	1	2
(Australia) M Jaggard-Lai	6	4	6
(Indonesia) R Tedjakusuma	3	6	2
LL	(Chinese Taipei) Lin Shu-ping	5	2
(Slovakia) J Husárová	7	6
WC	(Chinese Taipei) T-t Weng	2	0
2	(Japan) N Miyagi	6	6

Second round
5	(Germany) V Martinek	6	0	2
(Belgium) D Monami	4	6	6
(Slovakia) K Studeníková	7	6	2
4	(Japan) K Nagatsuka	5	7	6
6	(Japan) Y Kamio	6	7
(Australia) M Jaggard-Lai	3	5
(Slovakia) J Husárová	1	3
2	(Japan) N Miyagi	6	6

Quarterfinals
(Belgium) D Monami	5	3
4	(Japan) K Nagatsuka	7	6
6	(Japan) Y Kamio	6	6
2	(Japan) N Miyagi	2	2

Semifinals
4	(Japan) K Nagatsuka	2	7	6
6	(Japan) Y Kamio	6	5	3
