= 1993 P&G Taiwan Women's Tennis Open – Singles =

Singles
- 1993 P&G Taiwan Women's Tennis Open

Final
- Champion: (Chinese Taipei) Wang Shi-ting
- Runner-up: (United States) Linda Harvey-Wild
- Score: 6–1, 7–6^{(7–4)}

Details
- Draw: 32 (2WC/4Q/4LL)
- Seeds: 8

Events
| Singles | Doubles |
| ← 1992 · | Taipei Women's Championships | · 1994 → |

Shaun Stafford was the defending champion, but lost in the semifinals to Wang Shi-ting.

Shi-ting won the title by defeating Linda Harvey-Wild 6–1, 7–6^{(7–4)} in the final.

== Seeds ==
1. (Chinese Taipei) Wang Shi-ting (champion)
2. (Indonesia) Yayuk Basuki (first round, retired)
3. (Mexico) Angélica Gavaldón (first round)
4. (United States) Shaun Stafford (semifinals)
5. (United States) Linda Harvey-Wild (final)
6. (France) Alexandra Fusai (quarterfinals)
7. (Germany) Karin Kschwendt (quarterfinals)
8. (Australia) Rachel McQuillan (second round)

== Draw ==
=== Key ===
- Q = Qualifier
- WC = Wild card
- LL = Lucky loser
- Alt = Alternate
- SE = Special exempt
- PR = Protected ranking
- ITF = ITF entry
- JE = Junior exempt
- w/o = Walkover
- r = Retired
- d = Defaulted
- SR = Special ranking

=== Finals ===
Semifinals
1 | (Chinese Taipei) Wang Shi-ting | 6 | 6
4 | (United States) Shaun Stafford | 3 | 2
5 | (United States) Linda Harvey-Wild | 6 | 6
(Romania) Cătălina Cristea | 3 | 0

Final
1 | (Chinese Taipei) Wang Shi-ting | 6 | 7^{7}
5 | (United States) Linda Harvey-Wild | 1 | 6^{4}

=== Top half ===
First round
1 | (Chinese Taipei) S-t Wang | 6 | 6
WC | (United States) J Chi | 2 | 2
LL | (Australia) K Sharpe | 6 | 2 | 4
Q | (Australia) KA Guse | 4 | 6 | 6
LL | (Australia) JA Faull | 6 | 4 | 6
(Netherlands) C Wegink | 4 | 6 | 4
(Japan) N Miyagi | 4 | 3
6 | (France) A Fusai | 6 | 6
4 | (United States) S Stafford | 6 | 6 | 6
WC | (Chinese Taipei) T-t Weng | 7 | 3 | 2
(Czech Republic) E Švíglerová | 2 | 0
(Indonesia) R Tedjakusuma | 6 | 6
Q | (Australia) D Jones | 6 | 2 | 6
Q | (United States) C MacGregor | 1 | 6 | 3
LL | (Indonesia) J Sutedja | 0 | 1
8 | (Australia) R McQuillan | 6 | 6

Second round
1 | (Chinese Taipei) S-t Wang | 6 | 6 | 7
Q | (Australia) KA Guse | 7 | 4 | 5
LL | (Australia) JA Faull | 1 | 6 | 2
6 | (France) A Fusai | 6 | 4 | 6
4 | (United States) S Stafford | 5 | 7 | 7
(Indonesia) R Tedjakusuma | 7 | 5 | 5
Q | (Australia) D Jones | 6 | 6
8 | (Australia) R McQuillan | 3 | 0

Quarterfinals
1 | (Chinese Taipei) S-t Wang | 6 | 7
6 | (France) A Fusai | 3 | 6
4 | (United States) S Stafford | 6 | 6 | 7
Q | (Australia) D Jones | 7 | 3 | 5

Semifinals
1 | (Chinese Taipei) S-t Wang | 6 | 7
4 | (United States) S Stafford | 1 | 6

=== Bottom half ===
First round
5 | (United States) L Harvey-Wild | 7 | 6
Q | (Japan) H Nagano | 5 | 2
(United States) H Cioffi | 6 | 5 | 1
(Australia) K Radford | 3 | 7 | 6
(United States) E deLone | 2 | 5
(Japan) M Kidowaki | 6 | 7
(Australia) K Godridge | 6 | 6
3 | (Mexico) A Gavaldón | 2 | 4
7 | (Germany) K Kschwendt | 2 | 6 | 6
(South Africa) T Price | 6 | 4 | 4
(Japan) M Miyauchi | 5 | 4
(Japan) R Hiraki | 7 | 6
LL | (South Korea) S-h Park | 6 | 6
(United States) A Keller | 3 | 4
(Romania) C Cristea | 6 | 2
2 | (Indonesia) Y Basuki | 2 | 1 | r

Second round
5 | (United States) L Harvey-Wild | 5 | 7 | 6
(Australia) K Radford | 7 | 5 | 4
(Japan) M Kidowaki | 2 | 0 | r
(Australia) K Godridge | 6 | 3
7 | (Germany) K Kschwendt | 6 | 6
(Japan) R Hiraki | 4 | 0
LL | (South Korea) S-h Park | 6 | 1 | 6
(Romania) C Cristea | 4 | 6 | 7

Quarterfinals
5 | (United States) L Harvey-Wild | 6 | 6
(Australia) K Godridge | 2 | 4
7 | (Germany) K Kschwendt | 5 | 3
(Romania) C Cristea | 7 | 6

Semifinals
5 | (United States) L Harvey-Wild | 6 | 7
(Romania) C Cristea | 1 | 6
