= 1987 Taipei Women's Championships =

- Date: 20–26 April
- Edition: 2nd
- Category: 1
- Draw: 32S / 16D
- Prize money: $50,000
- Surface: Carpet / indoor
- Location: Taipei, Taiwan

Champions

Singles
- (Australia) Anne Minter

Doubles
- (United States) Cammy MacGregor (United States) Cynthia MacGregor
← 1986 ·	Taipei Women's Championships	· 1988 →

The 1987 Taipei Women's Championships was a women's tennis tournament played on indoor carpet courts in Taipei, Taiwan and was part of the Category 1 tier of the 1987 Virginia Slims World Championship Series. It was the second edition of the tournament and was held from April 20 through April 26, 1987. Third-seeded Anne Minter won the singles title.

== Finals ==
=== Singles ===
(Australia) Anne Minter defeated (West Germany) Claudia Porwik 6–4, 6–1

- It was Minter's first singles title of her career.

=== Doubles ===
(United States) Cammy MacGregor / (United States) Cynthia MacGregor defeated (United States) Sandy Collins / (United States) Sharon Walsh-Pete 7–6^{(10–8)}, 5–7, 6–4

- It was Cammy MacGregor's first doubles title of her career. It was Cynthia MacGregor's first doubles title of her career.

== See also ==
- List of sporting events in Taiwan
