= NAIA women's tennis championships =

Annual college tournament

- Sport: Tennis
- Founded: 1981
- Country: United States; Canada
- Most recent champion: Keiser (2)
- Website: NAIA.com

The NAIA women's tennis championship is the annual tournament to determine the national champions of women's NAIA collegiate tennis in the United States and Canada. Held annually since 1981, three separate championships are contested each year: team, singles, and doubles.

The most successful program has been Auburn–Montgomery, with fourteen NAIA national titles. Among active NAIA programs, Georgia Gwinnett have the most titles, with ten.

The current champions are Keiser, who won their second national title in 2026.

== Results ==
=== Singles, Doubles, and Team titles (1981–1999) ===
NAIA Women's Tennis Championship
Year	Site	Team Championship				Singles Champion	Doubles Champions
Year	Site	Champion(s)	Points	Runner(s)-up	Points	Singles Champion	Doubles Champions
1981	Overland Park, KS	Grand Canyon; Guilford	27	East Texas State	22	Pat Smith (Grand Canyon)	Pat Smith & Karen Regman (Grand Canyon)
1982	Overland Park, KS	Westmont	28	Guilford	25	Tarja Koho (Guilford)	Pat Smith & Karen Regman (Grand Canyon)
1983	Overland Park, KS	College of Charleston	33	Centenary (LA)	30	Laura Cotter Ingram (Centenary)	Karen Regman & JoAnne Murtro (Grand Canyon)
1984	Overland Park, KS	Arkansas–Little Rock	33	UT Permian Basin	29	Berit Björk (Arkansas–Little Rock)	Berit Björk & Sharon Feighan (Arkansas–Little Rock)
1985	Overland Park, KS	Arkansas–Little Rock (2)	33	North Florida	28	Berit Björk (Arkansas–Little Rock)	Berit Björk & Sharon Feighan (Arkansas–Little Rock)
1986	Overland Park, KS	North Florida	30	Arkansas–Little Rock; Texas–Tyler	29	Berit Björk (Arkansas–Little Rock)	Berit Björk & Sharon Feighan (Arkansas–Little Rock)
1987	Overland Park, KS	Flagler	28	North Florida	25	Janine Perkinson (Columbus)	Berit Björk & Katy Livijn (Arkansas–Little Rock)
1988	Overland Park, KS	Flagler (2)	45	Boca Raton	29	Catharina Persson (Flagler)	Bronna Allison & Laura Cadena (West Florida)
1989	Overland Park, KS	Flagler (3)	32	Grand Canyon	27	Bronna Allison (West Florida)	Catharina Persson & Julie Went (Flagler)
1990	Overland Park, KS	Flagler (4)	30	Boca Raton	26	Saskia Hermans (Auburn Montgomery)	Catharina Persson & Julie Downs (Flagler)
1991	Overland Park, KS	Flagler (5)	27	Auburn Montgomery	25	Helena Dahlstrom (Flagler)	Sarah Rafael & Jennifer Saberon (Saint Ambrose)
1992	Overland Park, KS	Auburn Montgomery	38	Flagler	36	Helena Dahlstrom (Flagler)	Helena Dahlstrom & Lindsay Ames (Flagler)
1993	Overland Park, KS	Lynn	36	Auburn Montgomery	34	Cristina Cavina (Lynn)	Sabine Gauger & Saskia Hermans (Auburn Montgomery)
1994	Tulsa, OK	Mobile	35	Auburn Montgomery	30	Anneli Ornstedt (BYU–Hawaii)	Marilia Andrade & Anita Pearson (Mobile)
1995	Tulsa, OK	Lynn (2)	34	Mobile	32	Isabella Listowska (Mobile)	Anneli Ornstedt & Maylani Ah Hoy (BYU–Hawaii)
1996	Tulsa, OK	Lynn (3)	35	Mobile	31	Laurence Neuville (Brenau)	Laurence Neuville & Aurelia Dubois (Brenau)
1997	Tulsa, OK	Brigham Young–Hawaii	46	Auburn Montgomery	30	Darin Ptaszek (BYU–Hawaii)	Teresa Stromberg & Anneli Ornstedt (BYU–Hawaii)
1998	Tulsa, OK	Brigham Young–Hawaii (2)	39	Auburn Montgomery	31	Simona Galik (Flagler)	Cecelia Hincapie & Ximena Rodriguez (Auburn Montgomery)
1999	Boca Raton, FL	Auburn Montgomery (2); Brenau	37	Oklahoma City	30	Li Chen (Oklahoma City)	Natalia Gonzalez & Ximena Rodriguez (Auburn Montgomery)

=== Team title only (2000–present) ===
NAIA Women's Tennis Championship
Year	Site	Team Championship		
Year	Site	Champion	Score	Runner-up
2000	Lexington, KY	Auburn Montgomery (3)	5–4	Brenau
2001	Lexington, KY	Auburn Montgomery (4)	5–2	Brenau
2002	Peachtree, KY	Brenau (2)	5–2	Auburn Montgomery
2003	Peachtree, KY	Northwood University–Florida	5–2	Auburn Montgomery
2004	Mobile, AL	Auburn Montgomery (5)	5–0	Azusa Pacific
2005	Mobile, AL	Auburn Montgomery (6)	5–2	Brenau
2006	Mobile, AL	Auburn Montgomery (7)	5–1	Fresno State
2007	Mobile, AL	Auburn Montgomery (8)	5–3	Fresno Pacific
2008	Mobile, AL	Auburn Montgomery (9)	5–1	Fresno Pacific
2009	Mobile, AL	Auburn Montgomery (10)	5–0	Fresno Pacific
2010	Mobile, AL	Fresno Pacific	5–2	Auburn Montgomery
2011	Mobile, AL	Auburn Montgomery (11)	5–3	Fresno Pacific
2012	Mobile, AL	Auburn Montgomery (12)	5–2	Embry–Riddle
2013	Mobile, AL	Auburn Montgomery (13)	5–1	William Carey
2014	Mobile, AL	Georgia Gwinnett	5–4	Embry–Riddle
2015	Mobile, AL	Auburn Montgomery (14)	5–2	Georgia Gwinnett
2016	Mobile, AL	Georgia Gwinnett (2)	5–4	Lindsey Wilson
2017	Mobile, AL	Georgia Gwinnett (3)	5–3	Lindsey Wilson
2018	Mobile, AL	Georgia Gwinnett (4)	5–0	Keiser
2019	Mobile, AL	Georgia Gwinnett (5)	5–2	Keiser
2020	Cancelled due to COVID-19 pandemic			
2021	Mobile, AL	Georgia Gwinnett (6)	4–2	Keiser
2022	Mobile, AL	Georgia Gwinnett (7)	4–0	Keiser
2023	Mobile, AL	Georgia Gwinnett (8)	4–1	Keiser
2024	Mobile, AL	Georgia Gwinnett (9)	4–3	Keiser
2025	Mobile, AL	Georgia Gwinnett (10)	4–1	Keiser
2026	Mobile, AL	Keiser (2)	4–1	Lindsey Wilson
2027	Mobile, AL			
2028	Mobile, AL			

== Champions ==
=== Team titles ===
==== Active NAIA programs ====
Team	Titles	Years
Georgia Gwinnett	10	2014, 2016, 2017, 2018, 2019, 2021, 2022, 2023, 2024, 2025
Brenau	2	1999, 2002
Keiser	2	2003, 2026
Mobile	1	1994

==== Former NAIA programs ====
Team	Titles	Years
Auburn Montgomery	14	1992, 1999, 2000, 2001, 2004, 2005, 2006, 2007, 2008, 2009, 2011, 2012, 2013, 2015
Flagler	5	1987, 1988, 1989, 1990, 1991
Lynn	3	1993, 1995, 1996,
Little Rock	2	1984, 1985
BYU Hawaii	2	1997, 1998
Fresno Pacific	1	2010
North Florida	1	1986
Charleston	1	1983
Westmont	1	1982
Grand Canyon	1	1981
Guilford	1	1981

=== Singles titles ===
Rank	Team	Titles
1	Arkansas–Little Rock	3
1	Flagler	3
2	Brigham Young–Hawaii	2
3	Auburn Montgomery	1
3	Brenau	1
3	Centenary (LA)	1
3	Columbus State	1
3	Grand Canyon	1
3	Guilford	1
3	Lynn	1
3	Mobile	1
3	Oklahoma City	1
3	West Florida	1

=== Doubles titles ===
Rank	Team	Titles
1	Arkansas–Little Rock	4
2	Auburn Montgomery	3
2	Flagler	3
2	Grand Canyon	3
3	Brigham Young–Hawaii	2
4	Brenau	1
4	Mobile	1
4	Saint Ambrose	1
4	West Florida	1

- Schools highlighted in pink are closed or no longer sponsor athletics.
- Schools highlight in yellow have reclassified athletics from the NAIA.

== See also ==
- NAIA Men's Tennis Championship
- NCAA Women's Tennis Championships (Division I, Division II, Division III)
- NCAA Men's Tennis Championships (Division I, Division II, Division III)
