= 1994 P&G Taiwan Women's Tennis Open – Doubles =

Doubles
- 1994 P&G Taiwan Women's Tennis Open

Final
- Champions: (Australia) Michelle Jaggard-Lai (Canada) Rene Simpson-Alter
- Runners-up: (Belgium) Nancy Feber (France) Alexandra Fusai
- Score: 6–0, 7–6^{(12–10)}

Events
Singles	Doubles
← 1993 ·	Taipei Women's Championships

Yayuk Basuki and Nana Miyagi were the defending champions, but none competed this year.

Michelle Jaggard-Lai and Rene Simpson-Alter won the title by defeating Nancy Feber and Alexandra Fusai 6–0, 7–6^{(12–10)} in the final.

== Seeds ==
1. (Japan) Kyōko Nagatsuka / (Japan) Ai Sugiyama (semifinals)
2. (Japan) Yone Kamio / (Japan) Naoko Kijimuta (first round)
3. (Slovakia) Janette Husárová / (Belgium) Dominique Monami (quarterfinals)
4. (Australia) Michelle Jaggard-Lai / (Canada) Rene Simpson-Alter (champions)

== Draw ==
=== Key ===
- Q = Qualifier
- WC = Wild card
- LL = Lucky loser
- Alt = Alternate
- SE = Special exempt
- PR = Protected ranking
- ITF = ITF entry
- JE = Junior exempt
- w/o = Walkover
- r = Retired
- d = Defaulted
- SR = Special ranking

=== Draw ===
First round
1	(Japan) K Nagatsuka (Japan) A Sugiyama	6	6
(Germany) V Martinek (Germany) P Winzenhöller	3	4
(Chinese Taipei) S-t Wang (Chinese Taipei) T-t Weng	6	2	6
Q	(Japan) M Miyauchi (United States) J Watanabe	4	6	4
4	(Australia) M Jaggard-Lai (Canada) R Simpson-Alter	6	6
(Australia) KA Guse (Australia) D Jones	3	4
(Japan) M Endo (Japan) N Sawamatsu	6	6
(Japan) H Nagano (Indonesia) R Tedjakusuma	1	2
(Czech Republic) P Rajzlová (Austria) M Schnell	1	6	0
(Czech Republic) R Bobková (Slovakia) K Studeníková	6	2	6
(Czech Republic) L Richterová (Austria) B Schett	6	3	3
3	(Slovakia) J Husárová (Belgium) D Monami	3	6	6
WC	(Chinese Taipei) Lai Su-jen (Chinese Taipei) Lai Su-ying	0	3
(Italy) R Grande (Germany) M Živec-Škulj	6	6
(Belgium) N Feber (France) A Fusai	7^{7}	6
2	(Japan) Y Kamio (Japan) N Kijimuta	6^{3}	3

Quarterfinals
1	(Japan) K Nagatsuka (Japan) A Sugiyama	6	6^{7}	6
(Chinese Taipei) S-t Wang (Chinese Taipei) T-t Weng	0	7^{9}	3
4	(Australia) M Jaggard-Lai (Canada) R Simpson-Alter	6	6
(Japan) M Endo (Japan) N Sawamatsu	4	2
(Czech Republic) R Bobková (Slovakia) K Studeníková	2	6	7
3	(Slovakia) J Husárová (Belgium) D Monami	6	2	5
(Italy) R Grande (Germany) M Živec-Škulj	6^{8}	5
(Belgium) N Feber (France) A Fusai	7^{10}	7

Semifinals
1	(Japan) K Nagatsuka (Japan) A Sugiyama	6^{5}	2
4	(Australia) M Jaggard-Lai (Canada) R Simpson-Alter	7^{7}	6
(Czech Republic) R Bobková (Slovakia) K Studeníková	3	2
(Belgium) N Feber (France) A Fusai	6	6

Final
4	(Australia) M Jaggard-Lai (Canada) R Simpson-Alter	6	7^{12}
(Belgium) N Feber (France) A Fusai	0	6^{10}
