= 1992 P&G Taiwan Women's Open =

- Date: 25 September – 4 October
- Edition: 5th
- Category: Tier V
- Draw: 32S / 16D
- Prize money: $100,000
- Surface: Hard / outdoor
- Location: Taipei, Taiwan
- Venue: Taipei City Courts

Champions

Singles
- (United States) Shaun Stafford

Doubles
- (Australia) Jo-Anne Faull / (New Zealand) Julie Richardson
← 1989 ·	Taipei Women's Championships	· 1993 →

The 1992 P&G Taiwan Women's Open was a women's tennis tournament played on outdoor hard courts at the Taipei City Courts in Taipei, Taiwan that was part of the Tier V category of the 1992 WTA Tour. It was the fifth edition of the tournament and was held from 25 September through 4 October 1992. Unseeded Shaun Stafford won the singles title and earned $18,000 first-prize money.

== Finals ==
=== Singles ===
(United States) Shaun Stafford defeated (United States) Ann Grossman 6–1, 6–3

- It was Stafford's only singles title of her career.

=== Doubles ===
(Australia) Jo-Anne Faull / (New Zealand) Julie Richardson defeated (South Africa) Amanda Coetzer / (United States) Cammy MacGregor 3–6, 6–3, 6–2

- It was Faull's 1st doubles title of the year and the 2nd of her career. It was Richardson's only doubles title of the year and the 7th and last of her career.

== See also ==
- List of sporting events in Taiwan
