= 1993 P&G Taiwan Women's Tennis Open =

- Date: 5–10 October
- Edition: 6th
- Category: Tier IV
- Draw: 32S / 16D
- Prize money: $100,000
- Surface: Hard / outdoor
- Location: Taipei, Taiwan
- Venue: Taipei Municipal Tennis Courts

Champions

Singles
- (Chinese Taipei) Wang Shi-ting

Doubles
- (Indonesia) Yayuk Basuki / (Japan) Nana Miyagi
← 1992 ·	Taipei Women's Championships	· 1994 →

The 1993 P&G Taiwan Women's Tennis Open was a women's tennis tournament played on outdoor hard courts at the Taipei Municipal Tennis Court in Taipei, Taiwan that was part of the Tier IV category of the 1993 WTA Tour. It was the sixth edition of the tournament and was held from 5 October through 10 October 1993. First-seeded Wang Shi-ting won the singles title and earned $18,000 first-prize money.

== Finals ==
=== Singles ===
(Chinese Taipei) Wang Shi-ting defeated (United States) Linda Harvey-Wild 6–1, 7–6^{(7–4)}

- It was Wang's 2nd singles title of the year and of her career.

=== Doubles ===
(Indonesia) Yayuk Basuki / (Japan) Nana Miyagi defeated (Australia) Jo-Anne Faull / (Australia) Kristine Radford 6–4, 6–2

- It was Basuki's 2nd doubles title of the year and of her career. It was Miyagi's 2nd doubles title of the year and the 4th of her career.

== See also ==
- List of sporting events in Taiwan
