= Linda Geeves =

British tennis player

- Full name: Linda Geeves-Bennett
- Country (sports): Great Britain
- Born: 21 June 1954 (age 72)

Grand Slam singles results
- French Open: Q1 (1982)
- Wimbledon: 1R (1980)

Grand Slam doubles results
- Wimbledon: 1R (1975)

Grand Slam mixed doubles results
- Wimbledon: 2R (1979, 1981)

Linda Geeves (born 21 June 1954) is a British former professional tennis player.

Geeves was active on tour in the 1970s and 1980s. She featured as a wildcard in the singles main draw of the 1980 Wimbledon Championships and lost her first round match in three sets to Betty Ann Dent.
