= 1994 P&G Taiwan Women's Tennis Open =

- Date: 14–20 October
- Edition: 7th
- Category: Tier IV
- Draw: 32S / 16D
- Prize money: $100,000
- Surface: Hard / outdoor
- Location: Taipei, Taiwan
- Venue: Taipei Municipal Tennis Courts

Champions

Singles
- (Chinese Taipei) Wang Shi-ting

Doubles
- (Australia) Michelle Jaggard-Lai (Canada) Rene Simpson-Alter
| ← 1993 · | Taipei Women's Championships |

The 1994 P&G Taiwan Women's Tennis Open was a women's tennis tournament played on outdoor hard courts at the Taipei Municipal Tennis Court in Taipei, Taiwan that was part of the Tier IV category of the 1994 WTA Tour. It was the seventh and last edition of the tournament and was held from 14 November to 20 November 1994. First-seeded Wang Shi-ting won the singles title and earned $18,000 first-prize money.

== Finals ==
=== Singles ===
(Chinese Taipei) Wang Shi-ting defeated (Japan) Kyōko Nagatsuka 6–1, 6–3

- It was Wang's 1st singles title of the year and the 3rd of her career.

=== Doubles ===
(Australia) Michelle Jaggard-Lai / (Canada) Rene Simpson-Alter defeated (Belgium) Nancy Feber / (France) Alexandra Fusai 6–0, 7–6^{(12–10)}

- It was Jaggard-Lai's 1st doubles title of the year and the 2nd and last of her career. It was Simpson-Alter's 1st doubles title of her career.

== See also ==
- List of sporting events in Taiwan
