= Little Rock Trojans =

Athletic program of the University of Arkansas at Little Rock

- University: University of Arkansas at Little Rock
- Nickname: Trojans
- NCAA: Division I
- Conference: UAC (primary); Pac-12 (men's wrestling); ASUN (women's swimming & diving)
- Athletic director: Frank M. Cuervo
- Location: Little Rock, Arkansas
- Varsity teams: 15 (7 men, 8 women)
- Arena: Jack Stephens Center
- Baseball stadium: Gary Hogan Field
- Soccer stadium: Coleman Sports & Recreation Complex
- Other venues: Donaghey Student Center Aquatic Center; Simmons Bank Arena
- Colors: Maroon, silver, and white
- Website: lrtrojans.com
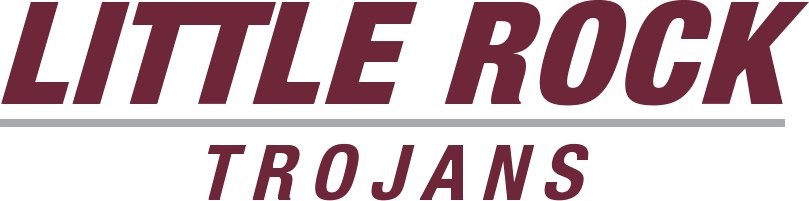

The Little Rock Trojans are the athletic teams representing the University of Arkansas at Little Rock. The Trojans are a non-football member of the Ohio Valley Conference and a men's wrestling affiliate member of the Pac-12 Conference. The university offers 7 men's and 8 women's varsity sports. Little Rock's primary in-state rival is Arkansas State.

For the 2005–06 basketball season, the Trojans moved into the $25 million Jack Stephens Center. This new facility almost doubled the seating capacity of the old Little Rock gym, with 5,600 seats and 149,000 square feet (13,800 m^{2}) of space.

On July 1, 2015, the Trojans officially announced they would no longer be branded as "Arkansas–Little Rock" or "UALR," but will be the Little Rock Trojans effective immediately.

Starting in the 2022-23 athletic season the Trojans joined the Ohio Valley Conference as their primary athletic conference. Despite leaving the conference, Little Rock still has Sun Belt rivalries with many of the former West Division schools (Arkansas State, Louisiana–Monroe, Louisiana–Lafayette, Texas State, and UT Arlington).

Little Rock left the Ohio Valley Conference after the 2025–26 school year to join the United Athletic Conference beginning in the 2026–27 academic year, coinciding with the rebranding of the Western Athletic Conference under the UAC name. Little Rock joined the rebranded league as a non-football member. Because the United Athletic Conference does not sponsor women’s swimming and diving, Little Rock placed that program in the Atlantic Sun Conference (ASUN), which will maintain a formal partnership with the UAC following the 2026 reorganization. The Trojans will have a built-in rivalry in the UAC with Central Arkansas, also located in the Little Rock metropolitan area.

== Sports sponsored ==
Men's sports	Women's sports
Baseball	Basketball
Basketball	Cross country
Cross country	Golf
Golf	Soccer
Track and field^{1}	Swimming and diving
Wrestling	Track and field^{1}
	Volleyball
^{1} – includes both indoor and outdoor

=== Basketball ===
Little Rock is a member of the United Athletic Conference as of July 1, 2026

In the years since becoming a four-year university, Little Rock has won slightly more games than they've lost. However, during the six-year coaching tenure of Mike Newell, the Trojans made a big splash on the national stage. Appearing in their first ever NCAA tournament game in 1986, the 14th seeded Little Rock beat the heavily favored and 3rd seeded Notre Dame Fighting Irish, coached by Digger Phelps, now a college basketball analyst for ESPN, 90 to 83. The Trojans lost in the second round to North Carolina State, 80 to 66 in two overtimes.

The 1986 NCAA Tournament success led to post-season appearances for the Trojans in each of the next four seasons. In 1987, Little Rock beat Baylor, Stephen F. Austin and California to make it to the National Invitation Tournament finals in New York City. The Trojans lost to both LaSalle and Nebraska to finish fourth. The next season, Little Rock lost to Louisiana Tech in the first round of the NIT.

The Trojans returned to the NCAA tournament in 1989 and 1990, losing to Louisville 76–71 in 1989 and to eventual tournament champion UNLV 102–72 the next season.

With five tournament appearances out of six seasons in Little Rock, Newell departed after the 1990 season and the Trojans didn't return to post-season play until the 1996 NIT under coach Wimp Sanderson, the Trojans' most recent tournament game.

The Trojans played in the 2011 NCAA Tournament, their first appearance since 1990, after winning the Sun Belt Conference Tournament championship. The Trojans also played in the 2016 NCAA Tournament, where as a 12 Seed, they defeated 5 Seed Purdue in the opening round of play.

The women's team has also had its fair share of success since beginning play in 1969 and joining Division I in 1999. They have won the conference tournament in 2011, 2012, 2015 while competing in the NCAA tournament four times in the past seven years (2010, 2011, 2012, and 2015), while going to the Second Round in the first and latter appearances.

Little Rock plays its home games in the Jack Stephens Center, an on-campus facility that seats 5,600. Prior to this home, the Trojans played at Alltel Arena (now Simmons Bank Arena) in North Little Rock, Arkansas. Previous to that, Little Rock's home games were played in Barton Coliseum on the Arkansas State Fairgrounds in Little Rock.

=== Football ===
Though the football program has long since been disbanded, the Trojans were a national powerhouse when the school was known as Little Rock Junior College. Coach Jimmy Karam revived a program in 1947 that hadn't played football since 1933. The team won the 1947 Coffee Bowl 31–7 against Coffeyville Junior College and played in the 1948 Junior Sugar Bowl, losing 18–7 to South Georgia. In 1949, the team went undefeated and won the Junior Rose Bowl in Pasadena, California, defeating Santa Ana Junior College 25–19 and earned the junior college national championship. The LRJC team had played their way to the Junior Rose Bowl by winning the Little Rock Shrine Bowl for the right to meet the California junior college champion.

=== Men's wrestling ===
On March 17, 2018, just hours before the start of the Division I NCAA wrestling championship finals, Little Rock announced the addition of a wrestling program. The school received a $1.4 million pledge from Arkansas businessman Greg Hatcher, considered the father of Arkansas wrestling for helping the sport grow in a state that did not sanction high school wrestling before 2008. The program began in 2019 and is the first Division I program in Arkansas. Little Rock joins Presbyterian and the unified Long Island University program as new Division I programs in 2019. In June 2018, Little Rock named former Oklahoma State wrestler and assistant Neil Erisman as their first head coach.

Little Rock's first commit was Kansas state champion Conner Ward.

As a member of the non-wrestling Ohio Valley Conference (just like its previous conference, the Sun Belt), the team is an associate member of the Pac-12. On January 24, 2021, Little Rock had its first win against a Division I school (Fresno State) and followed it up with a win against Pac-12 rival CSU Bakersfield.

Paul Bianchi became the school's first NCAA qualifier at 133 pounds in 2021. He finished 1–2 in the tournament, earning the Trojans their first NCAA Tournament win and finishing T58 with half a point.

The 2023-24 season was Little Rock's best to date. After nine combined wins in its first four seasons, Little Rock exceeded that total during the season. On January 19, 2024, the Trojans had its first win over a nationally ranked opponent, 24th ranked Arizona State. Little Rock reached 17th in the national rankings in February 2024, the first time any Trojan program reached the top 20, and had seven wrestlers in the coaches rankings, one of the factors that determine at-large bids for the national championship. The Trojans won the regular season Pac-12 title with a 4-1 record, 15-5 overall. Little Rock finished second in the Pac-12 tournament with three conference champions and five NCAA qualifiers. Nasir Bailey became the program's first All-American at 133, followed shortly thereafter by Stephen Little at 197. Bailey's fourth and Little's seventh earned the Trojans a 19th place finish in the national tournament with 24 team points and Erisman honored as NCAA Tournament Coach of the Year.

The Trojans initially won the 2025 Pac-12 Tournament and had six NCAA qualifiers, including five individual champions. Shortly after, the NCAA declared one of the athletes ineligible and the Pac-12 later awarded the conference champion to Oregon State.

== National championships ==
=== Team ===
Sport	Association	Division	Year	Runner-up	Score
Women's tennis (2)	NAIA	Single	1984	UT Permian Basin	33–29 (+4)
Women's tennis (2)	NAIA	Single	1985	North Florida	33–28 (+5)
