= Berit Björk =

Swedish tennis player (born 1963)

- Country (sports): Sweden
- Born: 19 June 1963 (age 63)

Grand Slam singles results
- French Open: Q2 (1982, 1984)
Association football career
- Position: Forward
College career
Years	Team	Apps	(Gls)
1987	Little Rock Trojans		(13)

Berit Björk (born 19 June 1963) is a Swedish former professional tennis player.

Björk, who comes from Sala, Sweden, was the national outdoor champion in 1981. On the professional circuit she made appearances at WTA Tour level and featured in qualifying for the French Open. She played collegiate tennis in the United States at the University of Arkansas-Little Rock, where she also competed on the soccer team for one season, scoring 13 goals and recording 2 assists. As a varsity tennis player she won three successive NAIA singles championships from 1984 to 1986.
