= Emiko Okagawa =

Japanese tennis player (born 1964)

- Country (sports): Japan
- Born: 26 December 1964 (age 60); Suginami, Tokyo, Japan
- Height: 163 cm (5 ft 4 in)
- Prize money: $105,855

Singles
- Highest ranking: No. 120 (11 May 1987)

Grand Slam singles results
- Australian Open: 3R (1988)
- French Open: 1R (1984, 1985, 1987)
- Wimbledon: 1R (1985)

Doubles
- Highest ranking: No. 138 (5 June 1989)

Grand Slam doubles results
- Australian Open: 1R (1988, 1990)
- French Open: 1R (1985)
- Wimbledon: 1R (1985)
- US Open: 1R (1985)

Emiko Okagawa (岡川恵美子, Okagawa Emiko, born 26 December 1964), later known as Emiko Sakaguchi (坂口恵美子 Sakaguchi Emiko) is a former professional tennis player from Japan.

== Biography ==
Born in Tokyo, Okagawa reached a best singles ranking on the professional tour of 120 in the world.

Between 1983 and 1987 she played in four Federation Cup ties for Japan. In her debut tie she helped Japan progress through to the World Group second round, winning both a singles and doubles rubber in Japan's 2-1 win over Denmark.

Okagawa was a semi-finalist at the 1987 Singapore Women's Open and made the third round of the 1988 Australian Open.

In 1993, her final year on tour, she became Emiko Sakaguchi after getting married.

== ITF finals ==
Legend
$25,000 tournaments
$10,000 tournaments

=== Singles (3–2) ===
Result	No.	Date	Tournament	Surface	Opponent	Score
Win	1.	11 October 1987	Kofu, Japan	Hard	(Japan) Rika Hiraki	6–2, 2–6, 6–1
Loss	2.	22 October 1988	Kuroshio, Japan	Hard	(Japan) Misumi Miyauchi	4–6, 3–6
Loss	3.	25 June 1989	Madeira, Portugal	Hard	(United States) Akiko Gooden	2–6, 5–7
Win	2.	19 November 1989	Kyoto, Japan	Hard	(Sweden) Annika Narbe	6–3, 6–1
Win	3.	8 June 1992	Oliveira, Portugal	Hard	(Slovenia) Karin Lušnic	6–2, 6–0

=== Doubles (2–0) ===
Result	No.	Date	Tournament	Surface	Partner	Opponents	Score
Win	1.	13 November 1989	Kyoto, Japan	Hard	(Japan) Naoko Sato	(Japan) Ayako Hirose (Japan) Miki Mizokuchi	1–6, 6–2, 6–1
Win	2.	22 June 1992	Leiria, Portugal	Hard	(Japan) Yoriko Yamagishi	(Japan) Hiroko Mochizuki (Netherlands) Nancy van Erp	6–2, 7–5

== See also ==
- List of Japan Fed Cup team representatives
