= WTA Singapore Open =

Singapore Tennis Open
- 2026 Singapore Tennis Open

WTA Tour
- Event name: Carslberg Singapore Women's Open (1986–1988); DHL Open (1989–1990); Singapore Classic (1994); Singapore Tennis Open (2025–)
- Tour: WTA Tour
- Founded: 1986
- Editions: 7
- Location: Singapore
- Venue: OCBC Arena, The Kallang (2025-)
- Category: WTA 500 (2026-), WTA 250 (2025), Tier IV (1990, 1994)
- Surface: Hard / indoor (1986, 2025-); Hard / outdoor (1987–1994)
- Prize money: $1,206,446
- Website: Website

Current champions (2026)
- Singles: (Canada) Leylah Fernandez
- Doubles: (New Zealand) Erin Routliffe (Indonesia) Aldila Sutjiadi

The WTA Singapore Tennis Open is a WTA Tour affiliated WTA 500-level tennis event held at the OCBC Arena at The Kallang in Singapore on indoor hardcourts.

The tournament was also held indoors in 1986, and then on outdoor hardcourts from 1987 to 1994. It was part of the WTA 250 tournaments in 2025 and was part of the WTA Tier IV category in 1990 and 1994. It was founded in 1986 as the Carlsberg Singapore Women's Open. The event ran till 1994, and resumed in 2025. In 2026 it was upgraded to a WTA 500-level event.

== Results ==
=== Singles ===
Year	Champions	Runners-up	Score
1986	(United States) Gigi Fernández	(Argentina) Mercedes Paz	6–4, 2–6, 6–4
1987	(Australia) Anne Minter	(United States) Barbara Gerken	6–4, 6–1
1988	(United Kingdom) Monique Javer	(Soviet Union) Leila Meskhi	7–6, 6–3
1989	(New Zealand) Belinda Cordwell	(Japan) Akiko Kijimuta	6–1, 6–0
1990	(Japan) Naoko Sawamatsu	(United Kingdom) Sarah Loosemore	7–6^{(7–5)}, 3–6, 6–4
1991 - 1993	Not held		
1994	(Japan) Naoko Sawamatsu (2)	(Argentina) Florencia Labat	7–5, 7–5
1995 - 2024	Not held		
↓ WTA 250 tournament ↓
2025	(Belgium) Elise Mertens	(United States) Ann Li	6–1, 6–4
↓ WTA 500 tournament ↓
2026	(Canada) Leylah Fernandez	(Australia) Talia Gibson	7–5, 6–0

=== Doubles ===
Year	Champions	Runners-up	Score
1986	(United States) Anna-Maria Fernandez (New Zealand) Julie Richardson	(United States) Sandy Collins (United States) Sharon Walsh	6–3, 6–2
1987	(United States) Anna-Maria Fernandez (New Zealand) Julie Richardson	(United States) Barbara Gerken (United States) Heather Ludloff	6–1, 6–4
1988	(Soviet Union) Natalia Bykova (Soviet Union) Natalia Medvedeva	(Soviet Union) Leila Meskhi (Soviet Union) Svetlana Parkhomenko	7–6, 6–3
1989	(New Zealand) Belinda Cordwell (Australia) Elizabeth Smylie	(United States) Ann Henricksson (United States) Beth Herr	6–7, 6–2, 6–1
1990	(United Kingdom) Jo Durie (Canada) Jill Hetherington	(France) Pascale Paradis (France) Catherine Suire	6–4, 6–1
1991 - 1993	Not held		
1994	(United States) Patty Fendick (United States) Meredith McGrath	(United States) Nicole Arendt (Australia) Kristine Radford	6–4, 6–1
1995 - 2024	Not held		
↓ WTA 250 tournament ↓
2025	(United States) Desirae Krawczyk (Mexico) Giuliana Olmos	(China) Wang Xinyu (China) Zheng Saisai	7–5, 6–0
↓ WTA 500 tournament ↓
2026	(New Zealand) Erin Routliffe (Indonesia) Aldila Sutjiadi	(China) Tang Qianhui (China) Xu Yifan	6–3, 6–2

== See also ==
- Singapore Open Championships (official ITF combined event 1921 to 1986)
- Singapore Open – men's ATP tournament
