= Anne Minter =

Australian tennis player

- Country (sports): Australia
- Born: 3 April 1963 (age 63) Victoria, Australia
- Turned pro: 1981
- Plays: Right-handed (one-handed backhand)
- Prize money: US$ 682,839

Singles
- Career record: 258–245
- Career titles: 4 WTA, 1 ITF
- Highest ranking: No. 23 (4 July 1988)

Grand Slam singles results
- Australian Open: QF (1988)
- French Open: 3R (1987)
- Wimbledon: 4R (1991, 1988)
- US Open: 3R (1984, 1988, 1989)

Other tournaments
- Olympic Games: 2R (1988)

Doubles
- Career record: 108–187
- Career titles: 2 ITF
- Highest ranking: No. 68 (19 March 1990)

Grand Slam doubles results
- Australian Open: QF (1984)
- French Open: 3R (1987)
- Wimbledon: 3R (1987)
- US Open: 2R (1984, 1985, 1987)

Mixed doubles
- Career record: 16–15
- Career titles: 0

Grand Slam mixed doubles results
- Australian Open: 1R (1988, 1992)
- French Open: F (1984)
- Wimbledon: QF (1984)
- US Open: 2R (1984)

Anne Minter (born 3 April 1963), also known as Anne Harris, is a former tennis player from Australia.

Ann competed for her native country at the 1988 Summer Olympics in Seoul, and was an Australian Institute of Sport scholarship holder. Minter won four singles titles on the WTA Tour: 1987 Taipei, Singapore; 1988 Puerto Rico; 1989 Taipei. She was a quarterfinalist at the Australian Open in 1988, beating fourth seed Pam Shriver in the fourth round. She twice reached the fourth round at Wimbledon, upsetting ninth seed Hana Mandlíková in the third round in 1988. She reached her highest individual ranking at no. 23 on 4 July 1988. On 19 March 1990, she reached her career-high doubles ranking of 68. Her playing career spanned from 1981 until 1992. Minter's win–loss record for singles stands at 258–245.

== Tennis career ==
=== Fed Cup ===
Minter made her Fed Cup debut for Australia in 1981 and played successively until 1989 only missing 1982 and 1983. In 1984, she led Australia to the final of the World Group where Australia lost narrowly 2–1 to Czechoslovakia. In 1989, Minter and the Australians lost in the semifinals to Spain, with Minter's losing in three sets to Arantxa Sánchez Vicario. This was her last appearance as an Australian player. By this time, her record stood at 20 wins (6 losses). In singles, it was a 16–6 winning record (4–0 in doubles).

=== Olympics and Grand Slam tournaments ===
Anne Minter played at the 1988 Seoul Olympics, reaching the second round of the tennis competition.

Her Grand Slam debut came in 1981. Her best performance was at the 1988 Australian Open when she reached the quarterfinals.

== Personal life ==
Minter married her former tennis coach, Graeme Harris. They were married in a church in Box Hill, Australia. Together, they have three children. The eldest, Caterina Harris was born in 1992, followed by Andrew Harris in 1994, and lastly Samantha Harris in 1995.

Following her tennis career, Minter pursued tennis coaching.

== WTA career finals ==
=== Singles: 7 (4 titles, 3 runner-ups) ===
Legend
Grand Slam	0
WTA Championships	0
Tier I	0
Tier II	0
Tier III	0
Tier IV & V	2

Result	No.	Date	Tournament	Surface	Opponent	Score
Loss	1.	Sep 1983	Kansas City, Missouri	Hard	(Australia) Elizabeth Sayers	3–6, 1–6
Loss	2.	Mar 1985	Hershey, Pennsylvania, U.S.	Hard	(United States) Robin White	7–6, 2–6, 2–6
Win	3.	Apr 1987	Taipei Championships, Taiwan	Carpet	(West Germany) Claudia Porwik	6–4, 6–1
Win	4.	May 1987	Singapore Open	Hard	(United States) Barbara Gerken	6–4, 6–1
Loss	5.	Aug 1987	San Diego Open	Hard	(Italy) Raffaella Reggi	0–6, 4–6
Win	6.	Oct 1988	Puerto Rico Open	Hard	(Argentina) Mercedes Paz	2–6, 6–4, 6–3
Win	7.	Apr 1989	Taipei Championships	Hard	(United States) Cammy MacGregor	6–1, 4–6, 6–2

=== Doubles: 1 title ===
Result	Date	Tournament	Surface	Partner	Opponents	Score
Win	Sep 1984	Salt Lake City, U.S.	Hard	(Australia) Elizabeth Minter	(United States) Heather Crowe (United States) Robin White	6–1, 6–2

=== Mixed doubles: 1 runner-up ===
Result	Date	Tournament	Surface	Partner	Opponents	Score
Loss	Jun 1984	French Open	Clay	(Australia) Laurie Warder	(United States) Dick Stockton (United States) Anne Smith	2–6, 4–6

Awards
Preceded by (United States) Peanut Louie-Harper	Karen Krantzcke Sportsmanship Award; 1987	Succeeded by (Soviet Union) Svetlana Parkhomenko
