= Maria Lindström =

Swedish tennis player (born 1963)

- Country (sports): Sweden
- Born: 7 March 1963 (age 63) Stockholm, Sweden
- Height: 1.78 m (5 ft 10 in)
- Retired: 1996
- Plays: Right-handed
- Prize money: $320,843

Singles
- Career record: 143–169
- Career titles: 0 WTA, 1 ITF
- Highest ranking: No. 87 (15 February 1988)

Grand Slam singles results
- Australian Open: 3R (1988)
- French Open: 1R (1986, 1987, 1988)
- Wimbledon: 1R (1988)
- US Open: 1R (1985, 1988)

Doubles
- Career record: 176–192
- Career titles: 2 WTA, 13 ITF
- Highest ranking: No. 44 (23 October 1995)

Grand Slam doubles results
- Australian Open: QF (1988)
- French Open: 3R (1988)
- Wimbledon: QF (1988)
- US Open: 3R (1989)

Other doubles tournaments
- Olympic Games: 1R (1992)

Mixed doubles

Grand Slam mixed doubles results
- Australian Open: 1R (1989, 1990)
- French Open: 1R (1990, 1995)
- Wimbledon: 1R (1993, 1995, 1996)

Team competitions
- Fed Cup: 9–13

Maria Lindström (born 7 March 1963) is a Swedish former tennis player. She won two doubles WTA titles as well as a further ten doubles ITF tournaments during her career. On 15 February 1988, Lindström reached a singles ranking high of world number 87 and on 23 October 1995 ranked world number 44 in doubles.

Lindström appeared 22 times for the Sweden Fed Cup team and represented her country in women's doubles with Catarina Lindqvist at the 1992 Summer Olympics.

== WTA Tour finals ==
=== Doubles 4 (2-2) ===
Titles by surface
Hard	1
Clay	0
Grass	0
Carpet	1

Result	W/L	Date	Tournament	Surface	Partner	Opponents	Score
Loss	0–1	May 1988	Geneva, Switzerland	Clay	(West Germany) Claudia Porwik	(Switzerland) Christiane Jolissaint (South Africa) Dianne Van Rensburg	1–6, 3–6
Win	1–1	Apr 1989	Taipei, Taiwan	Hard	(United States) Heather Ludloff	(Sweden) Cecilia Dahlman (Japan) Nana Miyagi	4–6, 7–5, 6–3
Win	2–1	Oct 1994	Essen, Germany	Carpet (i)	(Sweden) Maria Strandlund	(Russia) Eugenia Maniokova (Georgia (country)) Leila Meskhi	6–2, 6–1
Loss	2–2	May 1995	Prague, Czech Republic	Clay	(Sweden) Maria Strandlund	(United States) Chanda Rubin (United States) Linda Wild	7–6, 3–6, 2–6

== ITF finals ==
=== Singles: (1–1) ===
$100,000 tournaments
$75,000 tournaments
$50,000 tournaments
$25,000 tournaments
$10,000 tournaments

Result	No.	Date	Tournament	Surface	Opponent	Score
Loss	1.	March 11, 1985	Stockholm, Sweden	Clay	(West Germany) Christina Singer	4–6, 5–7
Win	2.	July 15, 1985	Båstad, Sweden	Clay	(Czechoslovakia) Olga Votavová	4–6, 6–3, 7–5

=== Doubles: (13–4) ===
Result	No	Date	Tournament	Surface	Partner	Opponents	Score
Win	1.	14 June 1981	Neumünster, West Germany	Clay	(Sweden) Catarina Lindqvist	(Sweden) Lena Sandin (Netherlands) Elly Appel-Vessies	7–6, 6–2
Win	2.	25 July 1982	Landskrona, Sweden	Clay	(Sweden) Elisabeth Ekblom	(Sweden) Berit Björk (Sweden) Stina Almgren	6–2, 6–4
Win	3.	29 August 1982	Cava de' Tirreni, Italy	Clay	(Sweden) Berit Björk	(Spain) Ana Almansa (Israel) Orly Bialostocky	4–6, 6–3, 6–3
Loss	4.	11 July 1983	Båstad, Sweden	Clay	(Sweden) Catarina Lindqvist	(West Germany) Gabriela Dinu (Italy) Patrizia Murgo	2–6, 6–4, 4–6
Loss	5.	22 August 1983	Herne, West Germany	Clay	(Denmark) Tine Scheuer-Larsen	(Sweden) Berit Björk (West Germany) Karin Schultz	4–6, 3–6
Loss	6.	5 September 1983	Bad Hersfeld, West Germany	Clay	(Denmark) Tine Scheuer-Larsen	(West Germany) Karin Schultz (Sweden) Mimmi Wikstedt	0–6, 5–7
Win	7.	17 October 1983	Ashkelon, Israel	Hard	(Denmark) Tine Scheuer-Larsen	(Israel) Rafeket Benjamini (Israel) Orly Bialostocky	6–0, 6–3
Win	8.	11 March 1985	Stockholm, Sweden	Clay	(Sweden) Elisabeth Ekblom	(United Kingdom) Jo Louis (United Kingdom) Jane Wood	7–5, 6–3
Loss	9.	10 June 1985	Birmingham, United Kingdom	Clay	(United States) Jenni Goodling	(United States) Ann Etheredge (United States) Sonia Hahn	2–6, 4–6
Win	10.	15 July 1985	Båstad, Sweden	Clay	(Sweden) Elisabeth Ekblom	(Sweden) Karolina Karlsson (Sweden) Anna-Karin Olsson	6–4, 6–4
Win	11.	7 July 1986	Båstad, Sweden	Clay	(Sweden) Catarina Lindqvist	(West Germany) Christina Singer (West Germany) Ellen Walliser	6–3, 6–2
Win	12.	10 September 1990	Eastbourne, United Kingdom	Hard	(United States) Heather Ludloff	(Belgium) Els Callens (West Germany) Tanja Hauschildt	7–6^{(8–6)}, 6–1
Win	13.	12 November 1990	Swindon, United Kingdom	Carpet	(United States) Heather Ludloff	(Finland) Anne Aallonen (Soviet Union) Eugenia Maniokova	4–6, 6–4, 7–6
Win	14.	24 June 1991	Ronneby, Sweden	Clay	(United States) Jessica Emmons	(Sweden) Jonna Jonerup (Netherlands) Simone Schilder	3–6, 6–2, 6–4
Win	15.	14 September 1992	Karlovy Vary, Czechoslovakia	Clay	(Sweden) Maria Strandlund	(Czechoslovakia) Kateřina Kroupová-Šišková (Czechoslovakia) Jana Pospíšilová	6–1, 6–2
Win	16.	3 April 1994	Moulins, France	Clay	(Sweden) Maria Strandlund	(Germany) Katja Oeljeklaus (France) Angelique Olivier	3–6, 7–6, 6–0
Win	17.	10 July 1994	Erlangen, Germany	Clay	(Sweden) Maria Strandlund	(Slovenia) Janette Husárová (Slovenia) Tina Križan	6–2, 6–2
