= Anna-Maria Fernandez =

American tennis player (born 1960)

- Country (sports): United States
- Born: October 22, 1960 (age 64); Torrance, California, U.S.
- Height: 5 ft 7 in (1.70 m)
- Turned pro: 1978
- Retired: 1989

Singles
- Career record: 50–71
- Career titles: 0
- Highest ranking: No. 19 (March 5, 1980)

Grand Slam singles results
- Australian Open: 2R (1983, 1988)
- French Open: 1R (1983, 1987)
- Wimbledon: 2R (1986)
- US Open: 3R (1978)

Doubles
- Career record: 57–65
- Career titles: 4
- Highest ranking: No. 44 (August 3, 1987)

Grand Slam doubles results
- Australian Open: QF (1982)
- French Open: 2R (1983)
- Wimbledon: QF (1987)
- US Open: 2R (1982, 1984, 1985, 1988)

Anna-Maria Fernandez (born October 22, 1960) is an American former professional tennis player active during the 1980s. She won five WTA titles during her career, all in doubles. Her career high ranking in singles was number 19, in approximately 1979–1980. She was a member of the University of Southern California's national championship team (1979 and 1980) and captured the AIAW singles national championship title in 1981. She was named the National Collegiate Player of the Year (1981) winning the Broderick Award (now the Honda Sports Award) as the nation's best female collegiate tennis player. She earned a BA degree in Broadcast Journalism from USC (1983).

She is married to former tennis player Ray Ruffels and is the mother of professional golfers Ryan Ruffels and Gabriela Ruffels. She is of Peruvian American ancestry.

== WTA Tour finals ==
=== Singles 1 ===
Legend
Grand Slam	0
WTA Championships	0
Tier I	0
Tier II	0
Tier III	0
Tier IV & V	0

Result	No.	Date	Tournament	Surface	Opponent	Score
Loss	1.	Nov 1978	Clearwater, Florida, USA	Hard	(United Kingdom) Virginia Wade	4–6, 6–7^{(1–7)}

=== Doubles 5 (4–1) ===
Legend
Grand Slam	0
WTA Championships	0
Tier I	0
Tier II	0
Tier III	0
Tier IV & V	0

Titles by surface
Hard	3
Clay	0
Grass	1
Carpet	0

Result	No.	Date	Tournament	Surface	Partner	Opponents	Score
Loss	1.	Jan 1984	Pittsburgh, Pennsylvania, USA	Carpet	(United States) Trey Lewis	(Switzerland) Christiane Jolissaint (Netherlands) Marcella Mesker	6–7, 4–6
Win	2.	Apr 1984	Durban, South Africa	Hard	(United States) Peanut Louie	(Brazil) Cláudia Monteiro (South Africa) Beverly Mould	7–5, 5–7, 6–1
Win	3.	Oct 1986	Singapore	Hard	(New Zealand) Julie Richardson	(United States) Sandy Collins (United States) Sharon Walsh	6–3, 6–2
Win	4.	Jan 1987	Auckland, New Zealand	Hard	(New Zealand) Julie Richardson	(United States) Gretchen Magers (Australia) Elizabeth Minter	4–6, 6–4, 6–2
Win	5.	Apr 1987	Singapore	Hard	(New Zealand) Julie Richardson	(United States) Barbara Gerken (United States) Heather Ludloff	6–1, 6–4
