= Taipei Women's Championships =

Defunct tennis tournament
- Event name: Taipei Women's Championships (1986–89); P&G Taiwan Women's Open (1992–94)
- Tour: WTA Tour
- Founded: 1986
- Abolished: 1994
- Editions: 7
- Location: Taipei; Taiwan
- Venue: Taipei Municipal Tennis Courts
- Category: Tier V (1992); Tier IV (1993–94)
- Surface: Carpet (1986–88); Hard (1989, 1992–94)

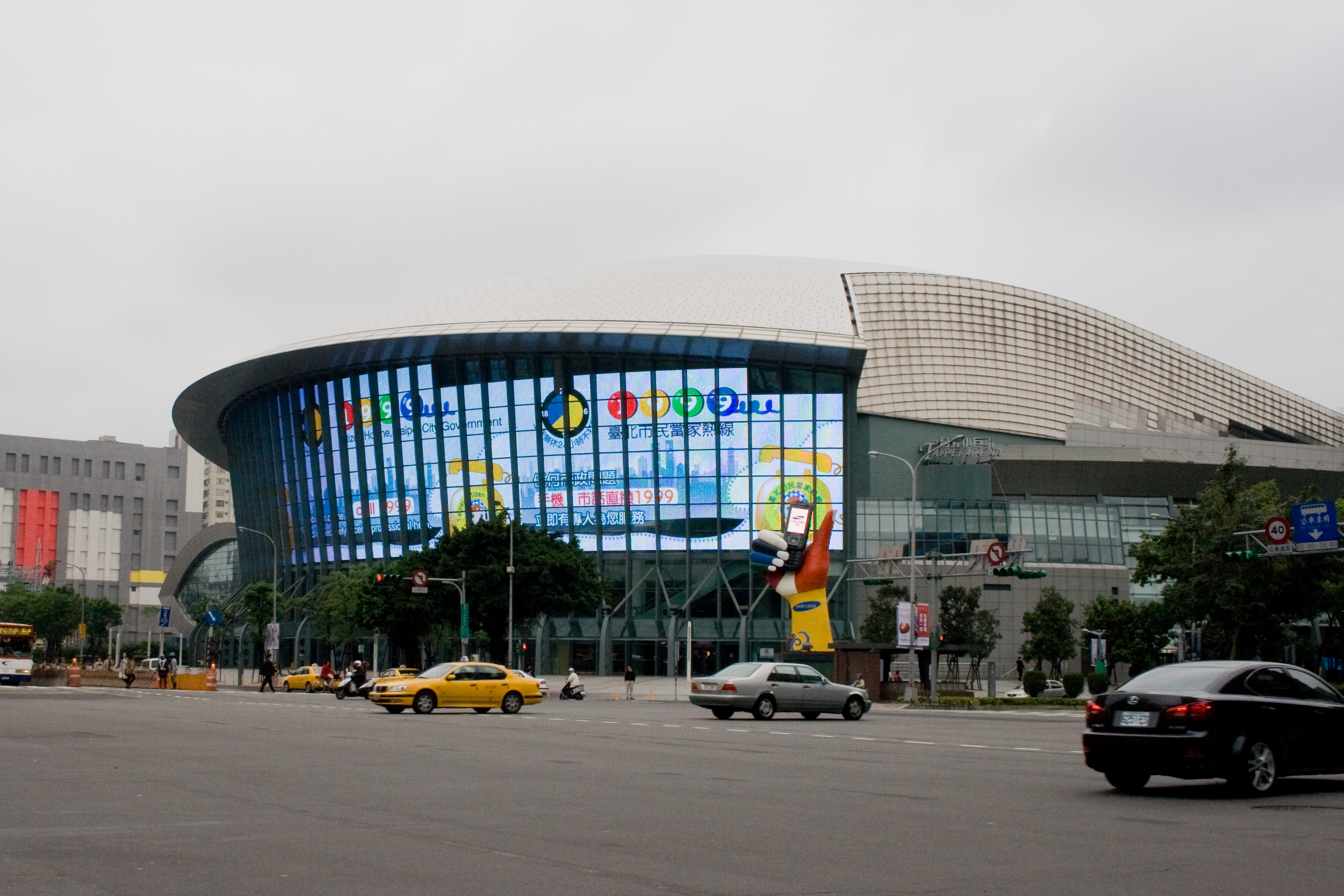
Taipei Arena

The Taipei Women's Championships is a defunct WTA Tour-affiliated women's tennis tournament played from 1986 to 1989 and from 1992 to 1994. It was held in Taipei, Taiwan and played on indoor carpet courts from 1986 to 1988, and on outdoor hard courts in 1989 and from 1992 to 1994. The 1980s tours were sponsored partly by Virginia Slims, and the 1990s events were sponsored by Kraft Foods and Procter & Gamble, the latter of which were named P&G Taiwan Women's Open or Taiwan Open in short. Anne Minter and Shi-Ting Wang were the most successful players at the tournament, each winning the singles competition twice.

== History ==
The inaugural 1986 tournament was called the Chung Cheng Centennial Cup International Women's Tennis Championships and ran from October 6–12, 1986 to commemorate the centennial anniversary of Chiang Kai-shek's birth. The 32-draw singles and 16-draw doubles was played on carpet and the prize money for singles was $50,000. The winner of the singles tournament was Patricia Hy of Hong Kong who defeated Adriana Villagrán of Argentina in three sets. It was part of the WTA's 1986 Virginia Slims World Championship Series schedule. In 1989, the tournament switched to outdoor hard courts. There was no tournament in Taipei for 1990 or 1991.

From 1992 to 1994, the tournament was run on outdoor hard courts where it was sponsored by Kraft Foods and called the P&G Taiwan Women's Open. It was played at the Taipei City Courts, also known as Taipei Municipal Tennis Courts.

== Past finals ==
=== Singles ===
Year	Champions	Runners-up	Score	Ref.
1986	(Hong Kong) Patricia Hy	(Argentina) Adriana Villagrán	6–7^{(6–8)}, 6–2, 6–3	
1987	(Australia) Anne Minter	(West Germany) Claudia Porwik	6–4, 6–1	
1988	(United States) Stephanie Rehe	(Netherlands) Brenda Schultz	6–4, 6–4	
1989	(Australia) Anne Minter	(United States) Cammy MacGregor	6–1, 4–6, 6–2	
1990–1991	Not held			
1992	(United States) Shaun Stafford	(United States) Ann Grossman	6–1, 6–3	
1993	(Chinese Taipei) Wang Shi-ting	(United States) Linda Harvey-Wild	6–1, 7–6^{(7–4)}	
1994	(Chinese Taipei) Wang Shi-ting	(Japan) Kyōko Nagatsuka	6–1, 6–3	

=== Doubles ===
Year	Champions	Runners-up	Score	Ref.
1986	(United States) Lea Antonoplis (United States) Barbara Gerken	(United States) Gigi Fernández (Australia) Susan Leo	6–1, 6–2	
1987	(United States) Cammy MacGregor (United States) Cynthia MacGregor	(United States) Sandy Collins (United States) Sharon Walsh	7–6^{(10–8)}, 5–7, 6–4	
1988	(United States) Patty Fendick (United States) Ann Henricksson	(New Zealand) Belinda Cordwell (New Zealand) Julie Richardson	6–2, 2–6, 6–2	
1989	(Sweden) Maria Lindström (United States) Heather Ludloff	(Sweden) Cecilia Dahlman (Japan) Nana Miyagi	4–6, 7–5, 6–3	
1990–1991	Not held			
1992	(Australia) Jo-Anne Faull (New Zealand) Julie Richardson	(South Africa) Amanda Coetzer (United States) Cammy MacGregor	3–6, 6–3, 6–2	
1993	(Indonesia) Yayuk Basuki (Japan) Nana Miyagi	(Australia) Jo-Anne Faull (Australia) Kristine Radford	6–4, 6–2	
1994	(Australia) Michelle Jaggard-Lai (Canada) Rene Simpson	(Belgium) Nancy Feber (France) Alexandra Fusai	6–0, 7–6^{(12–10)}	

== See also ==
- Taipei Grand Prix
- List of sporting events in Taiwan
