= Barbara Gerken =

American tennis player

- Country (sports): United States
- Born: July 3, 1964 (age 61)
- Turned pro: 1981
- Retired: 1989
- Prize money: $141,177

Singles
- Career record: 66–78
- Career titles: 0
- Highest ranking: No. 55 (June 8, 1987)

Grand Slam singles results
- Australian Open: 2R (1984, 1985)
- French Open: 1R (1984, 1986)
- Wimbledon: 3R (1986)
- US Open: QF (1981)

Doubles
- Career record: 60–67
- Career titles: 1 WTA, 1 ITF
- Highest ranking: No. 45 (January 2, 1989)

Grand Slam doubles results
- Australian Open: 3R (1987)
- French Open: 1R (1984, 1986, 1987)
- Wimbledon: 2R (1985, 1986, 1988)
- US Open: 2R (1984, 1986, 1987)

Barbara Gerken (born July 3, 1964) is a former American international tennis player who was a quarterfinalist at the 1981 US Open. She had a career record of 66–78. She had a career high singles ranking of world No. 55 in June 1987.

== WTA career finals ==
=== Singles: 3 (0–3) ===
Winner — Legend Grand Slam tournaments (0–0) WTA Tour Championships (0–0) Virginia Slims (0–3)	Titles by surface Hard (0–3) Grass (0–0) Clay (0–0) Carpet (0–0)

Result	W-L	Date	Tournament	Surface	Opponent	Score
Loss	0–1	Jul 1986	Berkeley, US	Hard	(United States) Melissa Gurney	1–6, 3–6
Loss	0–2	Apr 1987	Tokyo, Japan	Hard	(Bulgaria) Katerina Maleeva	2–6, 3–6
Loss	0–3	May 1987	Singapore, Singapore	Hard	(Australia) Anne Minter	4–6, 1–6

=== Doubles: 5 (1–4) ===
Result	W-L	Date	Tournament	Surface	Partner	Opponents	Score
Win	1–0	Oct 1986	Taipei, Taiwan	Carpet (i)	(United States) Lea Antonoplis	(United States) Gigi Fernández (United States) Susan Leo	6–1, 6–2
Loss	1–1	May 1987	Singapore	Hard	(United States) Heather Ludloff	(United States) Anna-Maria Fernandez (New Zealand) Julie Richardson	1–6, 4–6
Loss	1–2	Aug 1987	Aptos, US	Hard	(United States) Lea Antonoplis	(United States) Kathy Jordan (United States) Robin White	1–6, 0–6
Loss	1–3	Nov 1987	Little Rock, US	Hard	(United States) Lea Antonoplis	(United States) Mary-Lou Daniels (United States) Robin White	2–6, 4–6
Loss	1–4	Apr 1988	Tokyo, Japan	Hard	(United States) Lea Antonoplis	(United States) Gigi Fernández (United States) Robin White	1–6, 4–6
