= Lea Antonoplis =

American tennis player

- Country (sports): USA
- Born: January 20, 1959 (age 67) West Covina, California, United States
- Height: 5 ft 5 in (1.65 m)
- Turned pro: 1979
- Retired: 1991
- Plays: Right-handed
- Prize money: US$ 298,312

Singles
- Career record: 78–96
- Career titles: 0
- Highest ranking: No. 50 (December 31, 1981)

Grand Slam singles results
- Australian Open: 3R (1988)
- French Open: 1R (1983, 1984)
- Wimbledon: 4R (1977)
- US Open: 3R (1976)
- Wimbledon Junior: W (1977)

Doubles
- Career record: 99–110
- Career titles: 4
- Highest ranking: No. 55 (September 14, 1987)

Grand Slam doubles results
- Australian Open: 2R (1982, 1984)
- French Open: 3R (1983, 1987)
- Wimbledon: 3R (1978, 1979, 1983)
- US Open: 3R (1977)

Grand Slam mixed doubles results
- French Open: 1R (1987)
- Wimbledon: 2R (1979, 1987)
- US Open: 1R (1979)

Lea Antonoplis (born January 20, 1959) is a former professional tennis player from the U.S. who won the Wimbledon Girls' Singles in 1977 and four WTA doubles titles.

== Early life ==
Antonoplis attended Glendora High School from 1974 to 1977 and graduated from the University of Southern California.

== Tennis career ==
In 1974, Lea played an exhibition match arranged by Dale Jensen in Claremont, Ca with Tracy Austin, Lawrence McCutcheon, and Elgin Baylor.

Also in 1974, Antonoplis played in her first Grand Slam match at the US Open, losing to Sue Mappin in three sets. In the 1977 Wimbledon Championships, Antonoplis won the junior singles, beating compatriot Peanut Louie-Harper in the final in straight sets. In 1979, she won her first WTA doubles title in the Player's Canadian Open with Diane Evers, defeating Chris O'Neil and Mimmi Wikstedt 2–6, 6–1, 6–3. In 1983, she won two doubles titles with Barbara Jordan. In Indianapolis, they beat Rosalyn Fairbank and Candy Reynolds 5–7, 6–4, 7–5 in the final, and in Hershey, they beat Sherry Acker and Ann Henricksson 6–3, 6–4. In 1986, she won her fourth and last WTA doubles title with Barbara Gerken, beating Gigi Fernández and Susan Leo 6–1, 6–2 in the final.

Antonoplis also acquired some notability at a 1976 satellite tournament in South Orange, New Jersey when she won a three-set semifinal match against Renée Richards. This was the first tournament in which Richards competed after it was revealed that she had undergone a sex-change procedure.

== WTA Tour finals ==
=== Doubles 10 (3–7) ===
Legend
Grand Slam	0
WTA Championships	0
Tier I	0
Tier II	0
Tier III	0
Tier IV & V	0

Titles by surface
Hard	2
Clay	0
Grass	0
Carpet	1

Result	W/L	Date	Tournament	Surface	Partner	Opponents	Score
Win	1–0	Feb 1983	Indianapolis, Indiana, US	Hard	(United States) Barbara Jordan	(South Africa) Rosalyn Fairbank (United States) Candy Reynolds	5–7, 6–4, 7–5
Win	2–0	Feb 1983	Hershey, Pennsylvania, US	Hard	(United States) Barbara Jordan	(United States) Sherry Acker (United States) Ann Henricksson	6–3, 6–4
Loss	2–1	Nov 1983	Ginny Championships, US	Carpet (i)	(United States) Barbara Jordan	(South Africa) Rosalyn Fairbank (United States) Candy Reynolds	7–5, 5–7, 3–6
Loss	2–2	Aug 1984	Newport, Rhode Island, US	Grass	(South Africa) Beverly Mould	(United States) Anna-Maria Fernandez (United States) Peanut Louie	5–7, 6–7
Loss	2–3	Dec 1985	Auckland, New Zealand	Grass	(Argentina) Adriana Villagrán	(United Kingdom) Anne Hobbs (United States) Candy Reynolds	1–6, 3–6
Win	3–3	Oct 1986	Taipei	Carpet (i)	(United States) Barbara Gerken	(United States) Gigi Fernández (United States) Susan Leo	6–1, 6–2
Loss	3–4	Aug 1987	Aptos, California, US	Hard	(United States) Barbara Gerken	(United States) Kathy Jordan (United States) Robin White	1–6, 0–6
Loss	3–5	Nov 1987	Little Rock, Arkansas, US	Hard	(United States) Barbara Gerken	(United States) Mary-Lou Daniels (United States) Robin White	2–6, 4–6
Loss	3–6	Apr 1988	Tokyo Outdoor, Japan	Hard	(United States) Barbara Gerken	(United States) Gigi Fernández (United States) Robin White	1–6, 4–6
Loss	3–7	Jul 1988	Schenectady, New York, US	Hard	(United States) Cammy MacGregor	(United States) Ann Henricksson (New Zealand) Julie Richardson	3–6, 6–3, 5–7
