= Heather Ludloff =

American tennis player

- Country (sports): United States
- Residence: Foster City, California
- Born: June 11, 1961 (age 64); Honolulu, Hawaii
- Height: 5 ft 5 in (1.65 m)
- Turned pro: 1980
- Retired: 1993
- Plays: Right-handed
- Prize money: US$ 316,612

Singles
- Career record: 135–182
- Career titles: 0
- Highest ranking: No. 57 (August 15, 1983)

Grand Slam singles results
- Australian Open: 2R (1983, 1987, 1988, 1989)
- Wimbledon: 2R (1978, 1990)
- US Open: 3R (1982)

Doubles
- Career record: 140–174
- Career titles: 2
- Highest ranking: No. 37 (November 9, 1987)

Grand Slam doubles results
- Australian Open: QF (1983)
- Wimbledon: 2R (1983, 1984, 1985, 1986, 1987, 1990)
- US Open: 3R (1982, 1989)

Mixed doubles
- Career record: 5–13
- Career titles: 0

Grand Slam mixed doubles results
- Australian Open: 2R (1989)
- Wimbledon: 3R (1987)
- US Open: 1R (1987)

Heather Ludloff (born June 11, 1961) is an American former professional tennis player. She attained her highest singles ranking (57th in the world) in August 1983, and her highest doubles ranking (37th in the world) in November 1987. During her career, she garnered two WTA Tour doubles titles.

== Biography ==
=== Career ===
Ludloff played tennis for Brigham Young University (All American 1981), and UCLA (All American 1983), eventually becoming one of nine UCLA grads to reach the top 100 in WTA singles rankings.

She teamed with Terry Holladay to win the 1986 Virginia Slims of Newport doubles title. Ludloff has career wins over Elise Burgin and Bettina Bunge. She reached the semifinal of the 1983 NCAA Championship, beating No. 2 seed Elise Burgin, before losing to Gigi Fernández. She was ranked No. 8 in the U.S. National 18s for 1979. Ludloff represented USA on Junior Wightman and Federation Cup teams. She was coached by Ken Walts.

== WTA Tour career finals ==
=== Doubles (2–2) ===
Titles by surface
Hard	1
Clay	0
Grass	1
Carpet	0

Result	Date	Tournament	Surface	Partner	Opponents	Score
Win	Jul 1986	Newport, U.S.	Grass	(United States) Terry Holladay	(United States) Cammy MacGregor (United States) Gretchen Magers	6–1, 6–7, 6–3
Loss	May 1987	Singapore	Hard	(United States) Barbara Gerken	(United States) Anna-Maria Fernandez (New Zealand) Julie Richardson	1–6, 4–6
Loss	Oct 1987	New Orleans, U.S.	Carpet	(United States) Mareen Harper	(United States) Zina Garrison (United States) Lori McNeil	3–6, 3–6
Win	Apr 1989	Taipei, Taiwan	Hard	(Sweden) Maria Lindström	(Sweden) Cecilia Dahlman (Japan) Nana Miyagi	4–6, 7–5, 6–3
