= Julie Richardson =

New Zealand tennis player

- Country (sports): New Zealand
- Residence: Seattle, Washington, U.S.
- Born: 30 March 1967 (age 58) Auckland, New Zealand
- Height: 5 ft 8 in (1.73 m)
- Turned pro: 1984
- Prize money: US$ 356,728

Singles
- Career record: 171–171
- Career titles: 0
- Highest ranking: No. 100 (2 January 1989)

Grand Slam singles results
- Australian Open: 2R (1987, 1988)
- Wimbledon: 1R (1986, 1989)
- US Open: 3R (1988)

Doubles
- Career record: 243–165
- Career titles: 7
- Highest ranking: No. 20 (7 February 1994)

Grand Slam doubles results
- Australian Open: QF (1994)
- French Open: 3R (1989, 1994)
- Wimbledon: QF (1987, 1992, 1993)
- US Open: QF (1993)

Team competitions
- Fed Cup: 11–20

Julie Richardson (born 30 March 1967) is a former professional tennis player from New Zealand. She won seven doubles titles during her career.

== WTA career finals ==
=== Doubles: 14 (7 titles, 7 runner-ups) ===
Result	W-L	Date	Tournament	Surface	Partner	Opponents	Score
Win	1–0	Oct 1985	Japan Open	Hard	(New Zealand) Belinda Cordwell	(Peru) Laura Gildemeister (United States) Beth Herr	6–4, 6–4
Win	2–0	Oct 1986	Singapore Open	Hard	(United States) Anna-Maria Fernandez	(United States) Sandy Collins (United States) Sharon Walsh-Pete	6–3, 6–2
Win	3–0	Feb 1987	Auckland Open, New Zealand	Hard	(United States) Anna-Maria Fernandez	(United States) Gretchen Magers (Australia) Elizabeth Minter	4–6, 6–4, 6–2
Win	4–0	May 1987	Singapore Open	Hard	(United States) Anna-Maria Fernandez	(United States) Barbara Gerken (United States) Heather Ludloff	6–1, 6–4
Loss	4–1	Feb 1988	Wellington Classic, New Zealand	Hard	(New Zealand) Belinda Cordwell	(United States) Patty Fendick (Canada) Jill Hetherington	3–6, 3–6
Loss	4–2	Apr 1988	Taipei Championships, Taiwan	Carpet (i)	(New Zealand) Belinda Cordwell	(United States) Patty Fendick (United States) Ann Henricksson	2–6, 6–2, 2–6
Win	5–2	Jul 1988	Schenectady Open, United States	Hard	(United States) Ann Henricksson	(United States) Lea Antonoplis (United States) Cammy MacGregor	6–3, 3–6, 7–5
Loss	5–3	Feb 1990	Wellington Classic, New Zealand	Hard	(Australia) Michelle Jaggard	(Soviet Union) Natalia Medvedeva (Soviet Union) Leila Meskhi	3–6, 6–2, 4–6
Loss	5–4	Oct 1990	Puerto Rico Open, Puerto Rico	Hard	(United States) Amy Frazier	(Soviet Union) Elena Brioukhovets (Soviet Union) Natalia Medvedeva	4–6, 2–6
Loss	5–5	Jan 1991	Auckland Open, New Zealand	Hard	(Australia) Jo-Anne Faull	(United States) Patty Fendick (Soviet Union) Larisa Neiland	3–6, 3–6
Win	6–5	Feb 1991	Wellington Classic, New Zealand	Hard	(Australia) Jo-Anne Faull	(United Kingdom) Belinda Borneo (United Kingdom) Clare Wood	2–6, 7–5, 7–6^{(7–4)}
Loss	6–6	Feb 1992	Wellington Classic, New Zealand	Hard	(Australia) Jo-Anne Faull	(United Kingdom) Belinda Borneo (United Kingdom) Clare Wood	0–6, 6–7^{(5–7)}
Win	7–6	Oct 1992	Taipei Championships, Taiwan	Hard	(Australia) Jo-Anne Faull	(South Africa) Amanda Coetzer (United States) Cammy MacGregor	3–6, 6–3, 6–2
Loss	7–7	Feb 1994	Auckland Open, New Zealand	Hard	(Australia) Jenny Byrne	(Canada) Patricia Hy (Argentina) Mercedes Paz	4–6, 6–7^{(3–7)}

== ITF finals ==
$50,000 tournaments
$25,000 tournaments
$10,000 tournaments

=== Singles (4–4) ===
Result	No.	Date	Tournament	Surface	Opponent	Score
Win	1.	11 June 1984	ITF Freehold Borough, United States	Hard	(United States) Linda Howell	3–6, 6–1, 6–3
Loss	2.	30 July 1984	ITF Delray Beach, United States	Hard	(South Africa) Elvyn Barrable	6–1, 5–7, 6–7
Win	3.	30 April 1990	ITF Bangkok, Thailand	Hard	(Japan) Tamaka Takagi	4–6, 6–3, 6–2
Loss	4.	2 March 1992	ITF Mildura, Australia	Grass	(Australia) Jane Taylor	6–7, 3–6
Loss	5.	9 March 1992	ITF Wodonga, Australia	Grass	(Australia) Kate McDonald	0–6, 6–7
Win	6.	16 March 1992	ITF Canberra, Australia	Grass	(Australia) Kristine Kunce	6–2, 6–0
Loss	7.	23 March 1992	ITF Newcastle, Australia	Grass	(Australia) Jane Taylor	3–6, 6–3, 3–6
Win	8.	26 October 1992	ITF Saga, Japan	Grass	(South Africa) Tessa Price	6–2, 7–6^{(8)}

=== Doubles (16–4) ===
Result	No.	Date	Tournament	Surface	Partnering	Opponents	Score
Win	1.	28 May 1984	ITF Flemington, United States	Hard	(New Zealand) Belinda Cordwell	(United States) Beverly Bowes (United States) Becky Callan	6–0, 6–1
Win	2.	25 June 1984	ITF Chatham, United States	Hard	(New Zealand) Belinda Cordwell	(Australia) Rebecca Bryant (United States) Aschara Maranon	6–2, 6–0
Win	3.	9 July 1984	West Palm Beach, United States	Clay	(New Zealand) Belinda Cordwell	(United States) Patty Fendick (United States) Linda Howell	7–6, 6–7, 6–3
Win	4.	30 July 1984	Delray Beach, United States	Hard	(New Zealand) Belinda Cordwell	(United States) Linda Gates (United States) Cynthia MacGregor	7–5, 6–0
Win	5.	15 October 1984	Newcastle, United States	Grass	(New Zealand) Belinda Cordwell	(Australia) Amanda Tobin (Australia) Annette Gulley	6–3, 6–2
Win	6.	22 October 1984	Sydney, Australia	Clay	(New Zealand) Belinda Cordwell	(Australia) Jackie Masters (New Zealand) Michelle Parun	6–0, 6–2
Loss	7.	22 October 1984	Sydney, Australia	Grass	(New Zealand) Belinda Cordwell	(United States) Diane Farrell (Australia) Annette Gulley	3–6, 3–6
Win	8.	11 March 1985	Adelaide, Australia	Hard	(New Zealand) Belinda Cordwell	(Australia) Louise Field (Australia) Janine Thompson	6–2, 2–6, 6–2
Loss	9.	30 September 1985	Chiba, Japan	Hard	(New Zealand) Belinda Cordwell	(Brazil) Niege Dias (Brazil) Patricia Medrado	6–4, 4–6, 4–6
Win	10.	7 April 1986	Adelaide, Australia	Gras	(United States) Anna-Maria Fernandez	(New Zealand) Brenda Perry (Brazil) Themis Zambrzycki	6–2, 6–1
Win	11.	14 April 1986	Canberra, Australia	Gras	(United States) Anna-Maria Fernandez	(Australia) Louise Field (Australia) Elizabeth Minter	5–7, 6–3, 6–3
Win	12.	25 September 1989	Chiba, Japan	Hard	(New Zealand) Belinda Cordwell	(Japan) Ei Iida (Japan) Maya Kidowaki	6–7, 4–6
Win	13.	30 April 1990	Bangkok, Thailand	Hard	(United States) Jane Thomas	(South Korea) Kim Il-soon (South Korea) Lee Jeong-myung	6–4, 6–4
Loss	14.	17 September 1990	Chiba, Japan	Hard	(West Germany) Eva Pfaff	(Australia) Michelle Jaggard-Lai (United States) Marianne Werdel	4–6, 7–6, 6–7
Win	15.	2 March 1992	Mildura, Australia	Grass	(New Zealand) Amanda Trail	(Australia) Kate McDonald (Australia) Kirrily Sharpe	7–6^{(5)}, 7–6^{(3)}
Win	16.	9 March 1992	Wodonga, Australia	Grass	(New Zealand) Amanda Trail	(Australia) Danielle Jones (Australia) Kristine Kunce	6–4, 6–4
Win	17.	16 March 1992	Canberra, Australia	Grass	(New Zealand) Amanda Trail	(Australia) Danielle Jones (Australia) Kristine Kunce	6–3, 6–3
Win	18.	23 March 1992	Newcastle, Australia	Grass	(New Zealand) Amanda Trail	(South Africa) Michelle Anderson (Australia) Jane Taylor	6–4, 6–2
Loss	19.	27 April 1992	Jakarta, Indonesia	Clay	(Australia) Tracey Morton-Rodgers	(Australia) Kerry-Anne Guse (Australia) Kristine Kunce	6–7, 2–6
Win	20.	2 November 1992	ITF Machida, Japan	Grass	(Australia) Michelle Jaggard-Lai	(Netherlands) Ingelise Driehuis (Japan) Maya Kidowaki	6–3, 7–5
