= 1987 Virginia Slims World Championship Series =

Women's tennis circuit

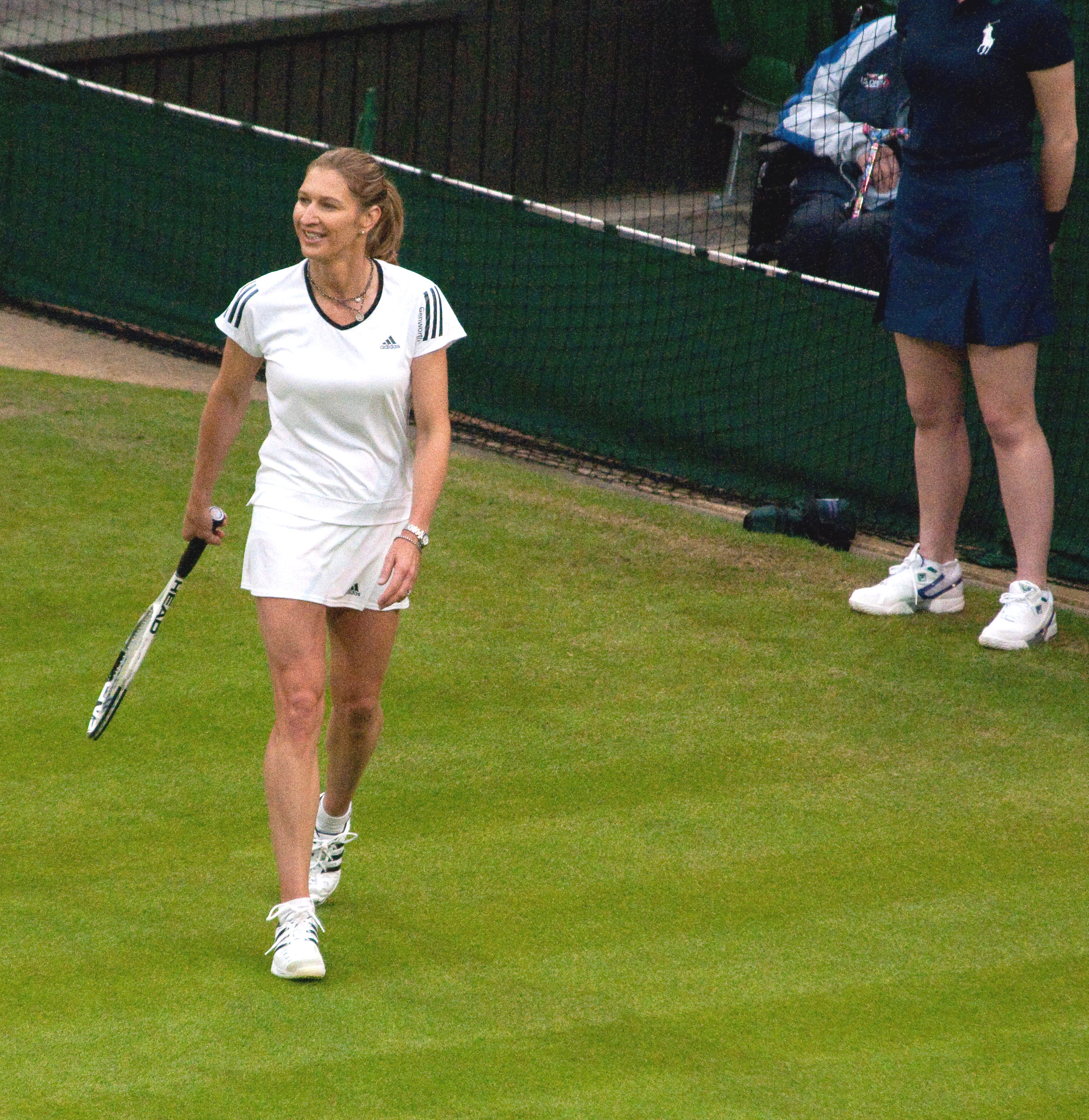
- Steffi Graf finished the year as world No. 1 for the first time in her career. She won eleven tournaments during the season, including a major at the French Open, as well as the Virginia Slims Championships. She also finished runner-up at two other majors, the Wimbledon Championships and the US Open.

Details
- Duration: 1 December 1986 – 22 November 1987
- Edition: 17th
- Tournaments: 56
- Categories: Grand Slam (4); Virginia Slims Championships (1); Category 4 (11); Category 3 (15); Category 2 (3); Category 1+ (13); Category 1 (7)

Achievements (singles)
- Most titles: (West Germany) Steffi Graf (11)
- Most finals: (West Germany) Steffi Graf (13)
- Prize money leader: (West Germany) Steffi Graf $1,063,785
- Points leader: (West Germany) Steffi Graf 280.2080

Awards
- Player of the year: (West Germany) Steffi Graf
- Doubles team of the year: (United States) Martina Navratilova; (United States) Pam Shriver
- Most improved player of the year: (United States) Lori McNeil
- Newcomer of the year: (Spain) Arantxa Sánchez Vicario
- Comeback player of the year: (West Germany) Bettina Bunge

The 1987 Virginia Slims World Championship Series was the 15th season of the tennis circuit since the foundation of the Women's Tennis Association. It commenced in January 1987, and concluded in December 1987 after events.

The Virginia Slims World Championship Series was the elite tour for professional women's tennis organised by the Women's Tennis Association (WTA). It was held in place of the WTA Tour from 1983 until 1987 and featured tournaments that had previously been part of the Toyota Series and the Avon Series. It included the four Grand Slam tournaments and a series of other events. ITF tournaments were not part of the tour, although they awarded points for the WTA World Ranking.

== Schedule ==
The table below shows the 1987 Virginia Slims World Championship Series schedule.

Key

Grand Slam tournaments
Year-end championships
Category 4 events
Category 3 events
Category 2, Category 1+ and 1 events
Team events

=== December 1986 ===
| Week | Tournament | Champions | Runners-up | Semifinalists | Quarterfinalists |
|---|---|---|---|---|---|
| 1 Dec | Argentinian Open; Buenos Aires, Argentina; Category 1 Clay – $50,000 – 56S/28D | (Argentina) Gabriela Sabatini; 6–1, 6–1 | (Spain) Arantxa Sánchez Vicario | (United States) Lori McNeil (Argentina) Mariana Pérez Roldán | (Argentina) Patricia Tarabini (Italy) Laura Golarsa (Argentina) Bettina Fulco (Netherlands) Nicole Muns-Jagerman |
| 1 Dec | Argentinian Open; Buenos Aires, Argentina; Category 1 Clay – $50,000 – 56S/28D | (United States) Lori McNeil (Argentina) Mercedes Paz; 6–1, 2–6, 6–1 | (Netherlands) Nicole Muns-Jagerman (Netherlands) Manon Bollegraf | (United States) Lori McNeil (Argentina) Mariana Pérez Roldán | (Argentina) Patricia Tarabini (Italy) Laura Golarsa (Argentina) Bettina Fulco (Netherlands) Nicole Muns-Jagerman |
| 8 Dec | Brazilian Open; São Paulo, Brazil; Category 1 Clay – $50,000 – 56S/24D; Singles – Doubles | (United States) Vicki Nelson-Dunbar; 6–2, 7–6^{(7–1)} | (United States) Jenny Klitch | (United States) Kathrin Keil (United States) Amy Schwartz | (Netherlands) Nicole Muns-Jagerman (Argentina) Adriana Villagrán (Spain) Arantxa Sánchez Vicario (Italy) Caterina Nozzoli |
| 8 Dec | Brazilian Open; São Paulo, Brazil; Category 1 Clay – $50,000 – 56S/24D; Singles – Doubles | (Brazil) Neige Dias (Brazil) Patricia Medrado; 6–4, 4–6, 7–6^{(8–6)} | (Peru) Laura Gildemeister (Austria) Petra Huber | (United States) Kathrin Keil (United States) Amy Schwartz | (Netherlands) Nicole Muns-Jagerman (Argentina) Adriana Villagrán (Spain) Arantxa Sánchez Vicario (Italy) Caterina Nozzoli |
| 29 Dec | Jason 2000 Classic; Brisbane, Australia; Category 2 Grass – $100,000 – 56S/32D | (Czechoslovakia) Hana Mandlíková; 6–2, 2–6, 6–4 | (United States) Pam Shriver | (Czechoslovakia) Helena Suková (United States) Betsy Nagelsen | (Canada) Helen Kelesi (South Africa) Rosalyn Fairbank (Australia) Elizabeth Smylie (West Germany) Eva Pfaff |
| 29 Dec | Jason 2000 Classic; Brisbane, Australia; Category 2 Grass – $100,000 – 56S/32D | (Czechoslovakia) Hana Mandlíková (Australia) Wendy Turnbull; 6–4, 6–2 | (United States) Betsy Nagelsen (Australia) Elizabeth Smylie | (Czechoslovakia) Helena Suková (United States) Betsy Nagelsen | (Canada) Helen Kelesi (South Africa) Rosalyn Fairbank (Australia) Elizabeth Smylie (West Germany) Eva Pfaff |

=== January ===
| Week | Tournament | Champions | Runners-up | Semifinalists | Quarterfinalists |
|---|---|---|---|---|---|
| 5 Jan | Family Circle NSW Open; Sydney, Australia; Category 3 Grass – $150,000 – 56S/32D; Singles – Doubles | (United States) Zina Garrison; 6–2, 6–4 | (United States) Pam Shriver | (Australia) Wendy Turnbull (Bulgaria) Manuela Maleeva | (United States) Lori McNeil (Czechoslovakia) Helena Suková (Japan) Etsuko Inoue (Sweden) Catarina Lindqvist |
| 5 Jan | Family Circle NSW Open; Sydney, Australia; Category 3 Grass – $150,000 – 56S/32D; Singles – Doubles | (United States) Betsy Nagelsen (Australia) Elizabeth Smylie; 6–7^{(5–7)}, 7–5, 6–1 | (Australia) Jenny Byrne (Australia) Janine Tremelling | (Australia) Wendy Turnbull (Bulgaria) Manuela Maleeva | (United States) Lori McNeil (Czechoslovakia) Helena Suková (Japan) Etsuko Inoue (Sweden) Catarina Lindqvist |
| 12 Jan; 19 Jan | Australian Open; Melbourne, Australia; Grand Slam; Grass – $670,101 – 112S/32D/32X; Singles – Doubles – Mixed doubles | (Czechoslovakia) Hana Mandlíková; 7–5, 7–6^{(7–1)} | (United States) Martina Navratilova | (Sweden) Catarina Lindqvist (West Germany) Claudia Kohde-Kilsch | (United States) Zina Garrison (United States) Pam Shriver (Australia) Elizabeth Smylie (United States) Lori McNeil |
| 12 Jan; 19 Jan | Australian Open; Melbourne, Australia; Grand Slam; Grass – $670,101 – 112S/32D/32X; Singles – Doubles – Mixed doubles | (United States) Martina Navratilova (United States) Pam Shriver; 6–1, 6–0 | (United States) Zina Garrison; (United States) Lori McNeil | (Sweden) Catarina Lindqvist (West Germany) Claudia Kohde-Kilsch | (United States) Zina Garrison (United States) Pam Shriver (Australia) Elizabeth Smylie (United States) Lori McNeil |
| 12 Jan; 19 Jan | Australian Open; Melbourne, Australia; Grand Slam; Grass – $670,101 – 112S/32D/32X; Singles – Doubles – Mixed doubles | (United States) Zina Garrison (United States) Sherwood Stewart; 3–6, 7–6^{(7–5)}, 6–3 | (United Kingdom) Andrew Castle (United Kingdom) Anne Hobbs | (Sweden) Catarina Lindqvist (West Germany) Claudia Kohde-Kilsch | (United States) Zina Garrison (United States) Pam Shriver (Australia) Elizabeth Smylie (United States) Lori McNeil |
| 26 Jan | Bridgestone Doubles Championships; Tokyo, Japan; Carpet (i) – $175,000 – 8D; Doubles | (West Germany) Claudia Kohde-Kilsch (Czechoslovakia) Helena Suková; 6–1, 7–6^{(7–5)} | (United States) Elise Burgin (United States) Pam Shriver | (United States) Fernández / (United States) White (United States) Collins / (United States) Walsh | (United States) Herr / (United States) Moulton (Australia) Byrne / (Australia) Thompson (United States) Nagelsen / (Australia) Smylie (United States) Reynolds / (United States) Smith |
| 26 Jan | Nutri-Metics Open; Auckland, New Zealand; Category 1 Grass – $50,000 – 56S/24D; Singles – Doubles | (United States) Gretchen Magers; 6–2, 6–3 | (United States) Terry Phelps | (Australia) Elizabeth Minter (United States) Kathrin Keil | (United States) Anna-Maria Fernandez (Australia) Michelle Jaggard (Belgium) Ann Devries (Australia) Nicole Provis |
| 26 Jan | Nutri-Metics Open; Auckland, New Zealand; Category 1 Grass – $50,000 – 56S/24D; Singles – Doubles | (United States) Anna-Maria Fernandez (Australia) Julie Richardson; 4–6, 6–4, 6–2 | (United States) Gretchen Magers (Australia) Elizabeth Minter | (Australia) Elizabeth Minter (United States) Kathrin Keil | (United States) Anna-Maria Fernandez (Australia) Michelle Jaggard (Belgium) Ann Devries (Australia) Nicole Provis |

=== February ===
| Week | Tournament | Champions | Runners-up | Semifinalists | Quarterfinalists |
|---|---|---|---|---|---|
| 2 Feb | Virginia Slims of Kansas; Wichita, United States; Category 1+ Carpet (i) – $75,000 – 32S/16D; Singles – Doubles | (United States) Barbara Potter; 7–6^{(8–6)}, 7–6^{(7–5)} | (Soviet Union) Larisa Savchenko | (France) Emmanuelle Derly (United States) Wendy Prausa | (Czechoslovakia) Jana Novotná (Soviet Union) Natalia Bykova (Soviet Union) Natasha Zvereva (West Germany) Sylvia Hanika |
| 2 Feb | Virginia Slims of Kansas; Wichita, United States; Category 1+ Carpet (i) – $75,000 – 32S/16D; Singles – Doubles | (Soviet Union) Svetlana Parkhomenko (Soviet Union) Larisa Savchenko; 6–2, 6–4 | (United States) Barbara Potter (United States) Wendy Prausa | (France) Emmanuelle Derly (United States) Wendy Prausa | (Czechoslovakia) Jana Novotná (Soviet Union) Natalia Bykova (Soviet Union) Natasha Zvereva (West Germany) Sylvia Hanika |
| 9 Feb | Virginia Slims of California; San Francisco, United States; Category 3 Hard (i) – $150,000 – 32S/16D | (United States) Zina Garrison; 7–5, 4–6, 6–3 | (West Germany) Sylvia Hanika | (Czechoslovakia) Hana Mandlíková (United States) Kathy Rinaldi | (Bulgaria) Manuela Maleeva (United States) Wendy White (Australia) Wendy Turnbull (United States) Stephanie Rehe |
| 9 Feb | Virginia Slims of California; San Francisco, United States; Category 3 Hard (i) – $150,000 – 32S/16D | (Czechoslovakia) Hana Mandlíková (Australia) Wendy Turnbull; 6–4, 7–6^{(7–4)} | (United States) Zina Garrison (Argentina) Gabriela Sabatini | (Czechoslovakia) Hana Mandlíková (United States) Kathy Rinaldi | (Bulgaria) Manuela Maleeva (United States) Wendy White (Australia) Wendy Turnbull (United States) Stephanie Rehe |
| 9 Feb | Virginia Slims of Oklahoma; Oklahoma City, United States; Category 1+ Carpet (i) – $75,000 – 32S/16D; Singles – Doubles | (Australia) Elizabeth Smylie; 4–6, 6–3, 7–5 | (United States) Lori McNeil | (Soviet Union) Larisa Savchenko (Sweden) Catarina Lindqvist | (United States) Hu Na (Soviet Union) Natalia Bykova (United States) Camille Benjamin (Australia) Anne Minter |
| 9 Feb | Virginia Slims of Oklahoma; Oklahoma City, United States; Category 1+ Carpet (i) – $75,000 – 32S/16D; Singles – Doubles | (Soviet Union) Svetlana Parkhomenko (Soviet Union) Larisa Savchenko; 6–4, 6–4 | (United States) Lori McNeil (United States) Kim Sands | (Soviet Union) Larisa Savchenko (Sweden) Catarina Lindqvist | (United States) Hu Na (Soviet Union) Natalia Bykova (United States) Camille Benjamin (Australia) Anne Minter |
| 16 Feb | Virginia Slims of Florida; Boca Raton, United States; Category 4 Hard – $250,000 – 56S/32D; Singles – Doubles | (West Germany) Steffi Graf; 6–2, 6–3 | (Czechoslovakia) Helena Suková | (Argentina) Gabriela Sabatini (United States) Pam Shriver | (United States) Kate Gompert (West Germany) Bettina Bunge (United States) Gigi Fernández (West Germany) Claudia Kohde-Kilsch |
| 16 Feb | Virginia Slims of Florida; Boca Raton, United States; Category 4 Hard – $250,000 – 56S/32D; Singles – Doubles | (Soviet Union) Svetlana Parkhomenko (Soviet Union) Larisa Savchenko; 6–0, 3–6, 6–2 | (United States) Chris Evert (United States) Pam Shriver | (Argentina) Gabriela Sabatini (United States) Pam Shriver | (United States) Kate Gompert (West Germany) Bettina Bunge (United States) Gigi Fernández (West Germany) Claudia Kohde-Kilsch |
| 23 Feb; 2 Mar | Lipton International Players Championships; Key Biscayne, United States; Category 4 Hard – $750,000 – 128S/64D; Singles – Doubles | (West Germany) Steffi Graf; 6–1, 6–2 | (United States) Chris Evert | (United States) Martina Navratilova (Czechoslovakia) Hana Mandlíková | (France) Nathalie Tauziat (United States) Lisa Bonder (Czechoslovakia) Helena Suková (West Germany) Claudia Kohde-Kilsch |
| 23 Feb; 2 Mar | Lipton International Players Championships; Key Biscayne, United States; Category 4 Hard – $750,000 – 128S/64D; Singles – Doubles | (United States) Martina Navratilova (United States) Pam Shriver; 6–3, 7–6^{(8–6)} | (West Germany) Claudia Kohde-Kilsch (Czechoslovakia) Helena Suková | (United States) Martina Navratilova (Czechoslovakia) Hana Mandlíková | (France) Nathalie Tauziat (United States) Lisa Bonder (Czechoslovakia) Helena Suková (West Germany) Claudia Kohde-Kilsch |

=== March ===
| Week | Tournament | Champions | Runners-up | Semifinalists | Quarterfinalists |
|---|---|---|---|---|---|
| 9 Mar | Virginia Slims of Arizona; Phoenix, United States; Category 1+ Hard (i) – $75,000 – 56S/24D; Singles – Doubles | (United States) Anne White; 6–1, 6–2 | (Australia) Dianne Balestrat | (United States) Sharon Walsh-Pete (Sweden) Maria Lindström | (France) Catherine Suire (United States) Ann Henricksson (Switzerland) Christiane Jolissaint (United States) Penny Barg |
| 9 Mar | Virginia Slims of Arizona; Phoenix, United States; Category 1+ Hard (i) – $75,000 – 56S/24D; Singles – Doubles | (United States) Penny Barg (United States) Beth Herr; 2–6, 6–2, 7–6^{(7–2)} | (United States) Mary Lou Piatek (United States) Anne White | (United States) Sharon Walsh-Pete (Sweden) Maria Lindström | (France) Catherine Suire (United States) Ann Henricksson (Switzerland) Christiane Jolissaint (United States) Penny Barg |
| 16 Mar | Virginia Slims of Dallas; Dallas, United States; Category 4 Carpet (i) – $250,000 – 32S/16D | (United States) Chris Evert; 6–1, 6–3 | (United States) Pam Shriver | (United States) Zina Garrison (United States) Lori McNeil | (United States) Stephanie Rehe (West Germany) Bettina Bunge (Bulgaria) Manuela Maleeva (Australia) Wendy Turnbull |
| 16 Mar | Virginia Slims of Dallas; Dallas, United States; Category 4 Carpet (i) – $250,000 – 32S/16D | (United States) Mary Lou Piatek (United States) Anne White; 7–5, 6–3 | (United States) Elise Burgin (United States) Robin White | (United States) Zina Garrison (United States) Lori McNeil | (United States) Stephanie Rehe (West Germany) Bettina Bunge (Bulgaria) Manuela Maleeva (Australia) Wendy Turnbull |
| 23 Mar | Virginia Slims of Washington; Washington, United States; Category 3 Carpet (i) – $150,000 – 32S/16D | (Czechoslovakia) Hana Mandlíková; 6–4, 6–2 | (United States) Barbara Potter | (Czechoslovakia) Helena Suková (United States) Zina Garrison | (United States) Kathy Rinaldi (United States) Lori McNeil (United States) Ann Henricksson (West Germany) Sylvia Hanika |
| 23 Mar | Virginia Slims of Washington; Washington, United States; Category 3 Carpet (i) – $150,000 – 32S/16D | (United States) Elise Burgin (United States) Pam Shriver; 6–1, 3–6, 6–4 | (United States) Zina Garrison (United States) Lori McNeil | (Czechoslovakia) Helena Suková (United States) Zina Garrison | (United States) Kathy Rinaldi (United States) Lori McNeil (United States) Ann Henricksson (West Germany) Sylvia Hanika |
| 30 Mar | Wild Dunes; Charleston, United States; Category 1+ Clay – $75,000 – 56S/24D | (Bulgaria) Manuela Maleeva; 5–7, 6–2, 6–3 | (Italy) Raffaella Reggi | (Argentina) Bettina Fulco (Czechoslovakia) Jana Novotná | (United States) Halle Cioffi (Italy) Sandra Cecchini (United States) Kate Gompert (West Germany) Wiltrud Probst |
| 30 Mar | Wild Dunes; Charleston, United States; Category 1+ Clay – $75,000 – 56S/24D | (Peru) Laura Gildemeister (Denmark) Tine Scheuer-Larsen; 6–4, 6–4 | (Argentina) Mercedes Paz (United States) Candy Reynolds | (Argentina) Bettina Fulco (Czechoslovakia) Jana Novotná | (United States) Halle Cioffi (Italy) Sandra Cecchini (United States) Kate Gompert (West Germany) Wiltrud Probst |
| 30 Mar | US Indoors; Princeton, United States; Category 3 Carpet (i) – $150,000 – 32S/14D | (Czechoslovakia) Helena Suková; 6–0, 6–3 | (United States) Lori McNeil | (Czechoslovakia) Hana Mandlíková (United States) Gigi Fernández | (West Germany) Sylvia Hanika (Australia) Wendy Turnbull (United States) Grace Kim (Sweden) Catarina Lindqvist |
| 30 Mar | US Indoors; Princeton, United States; Category 3 Carpet (i) – $150,000 – 32S/14D | (United States) Gigi Fernández; (United States) Lori McNeil; 6–1, 6–4 | (United States) Betsy Nagelsen; (Australia) Elizabeth Smylie | (Czechoslovakia) Hana Mandlíková (United States) Gigi Fernández | (West Germany) Sylvia Hanika (Australia) Wendy Turnbull (United States) Grace Kim (Sweden) Catarina Lindqvist |

=== April ===
| Week | Tournament | Champions | Runners-up | Semifinalists | Quarterfinalists |
|---|---|---|---|---|---|
| 6 Apr | Family Circle Cup; Hilton Head Island, United States; Category 4 Clay – $300,000 – 56S/28D | (West Germany) Steffi Graf; 6–2, 4–6, 6–3 | (Bulgaria) Manuela Maleeva | (Argentina) Gabriela Sabatini (United States) Chris Evert | (Canada) Helen Kelesi (West Germany) Claudia Kohde-Kilsch (United States) Zina Garrison (West Germany) Bettina Bunge |
| 6 Apr | Family Circle Cup; Hilton Head Island, United States; Category 4 Clay – $300,000 – 56S/28D | (Argentina) Mercedes Paz (West Germany) Eva Pfaff; 7–6^{(8–6)}, 7–5 | (United States) Zina Garrison (United States) Lori McNeil | (Argentina) Gabriela Sabatini (United States) Chris Evert | (Canada) Helen Kelesi (West Germany) Claudia Kohde-Kilsch (United States) Zina Garrison (West Germany) Bettina Bunge |
| 13 Apr | WITA Championships; Amelia Island, United States; Category 4 Clay – $275,000 – 56S/28D; Singles – Doubles | (West Germany) Steffi Graf; 6–3, 6–4 | (Czechoslovakia) Hana Mandlíková | (Argentina) Gabriela Sabatini (United States) Zina Garrison | (Bulgaria) Manuela Maleeva (Canada) Helen Kelesi (United States) Kathy Rinaldi (United States) Terry Phelps |
| 13 Apr | WITA Championships; Amelia Island, United States; Category 4 Clay – $275,000 – 56S/28D; Singles – Doubles | (West Germany) Steffi Graf (Argentina) Gabriela Sabatini; 3–6, 6–3, 7–5 | (Czechoslovakia) Hana Mandlíková (Australia) Wendy Turnbull | (Argentina) Gabriela Sabatini (United States) Zina Garrison | (Bulgaria) Manuela Maleeva (Canada) Helen Kelesi (United States) Kathy Rinaldi (United States) Terry Phelps |
| 13 Apr | Suntory Japan Open Tennis Championships; Tokyo, Japan; Category 1+ Hard – $75,000 – 32S/16D; Singles – Doubles | (Bulgaria) Katerina Maleeva; 6–2, 6–3 | (United States) Barbara Gerken | (Japan) Etsuko Kaneshiro (United States) Betsy Nagelsen | (United States) Melissa Gurney (United States) Kathy Jordan (Japan) Kumiko Okamoto (United States) Beth Herr |
| 13 Apr | Suntory Japan Open Tennis Championships; Tokyo, Japan; Category 1+ Hard – $75,000 – 32S/16D; Singles – Doubles | (United States) Betsy Nagelsen; (United States) Kathy Jordan; 6–3, 7–5 | (United States) Sandy Collins; (United States) Sharon Walsh | (Japan) Etsuko Kaneshiro (United States) Betsy Nagelsen | (United States) Melissa Gurney (United States) Kathy Jordan (Japan) Kumiko Okamoto (United States) Beth Herr |
| 20 Apr | Virginia Slims of Houston; Houston, Texas, United States; Category 3 Clay – $150,000 – 32S/16D | (United States) Chris Evert; 3–6, 6–1, 7–6^{(7–4)} | (United States) Martina Navratilova | (United States) Zina Garrison (Czechoslovakia) Hana Mandlíková | (United States) Lori McNeil (Italy) Raffaella Reggi (United States) Kate Gompert (Argentina) Gabriela Sabatini |
| 20 Apr | Virginia Slims of Houston; Houston, Texas, United States; Category 3 Clay – $150,000 – 32S/16D | (United States) Kathy Jordan (United States) Martina Navratilova; 6–2, 6–4 | (United States) Zina Garrison (United States) Lori McNeil | (United States) Zina Garrison (Czechoslovakia) Hana Mandlíková | (United States) Lori McNeil (Italy) Raffaella Reggi (United States) Kate Gompert (Argentina) Gabriela Sabatini |
| 20 Apr | Taipei Women's Championships; Taipei, Taiwan; Category 1 Carpet (i) – $50,000 – 32S/16D; Singles – Doubles | (Australia) Anne Minter; 6–4, 6–1 | (West Germany) Claudia Porwik | (Argentina) Adriana Villagrán (United States) Heather Ludloff | (Brazil) Cláudia Monteiro (Belgium) Ann Devries (Italy) Caterina Nozzoli (Italy) Laura Golarsa |
| 20 Apr | Taipei Women's Championships; Taipei, Taiwan; Category 1 Carpet (i) – $50,000 – 32S/16D; Singles – Doubles | (United States) Cammy MacGregor; (United States) Cynthia MacGregor; 7–6^{(10–8)}, 5–7, 6–4 | (United States) Sandy Collins; (United States) Sharon Walsh-Pete | (Argentina) Adriana Villagrán (United States) Heather Ludloff | (Brazil) Cláudia Monteiro (Belgium) Ann Devries (Italy) Caterina Nozzoli (Italy) Laura Golarsa |
| 27 Apr | Eckerd Open; Tampa United States; Category 3 Clay – $150,000 – 32S/16D | (United States) Chris Evert; 6–3, 6–2 | (United States) Kate Gompert | (United States) Beverly Bowes-Hackney (United States) Kathy Rinaldi | (Peru) Laura Gildemeister (United States) Terry Phelps (United States) Ronni Reis (Brazil) Gisele Miró |
| 27 Apr | Eckerd Open; Tampa United States; Category 3 Clay – $150,000 – 32S/16D | (United States) Chris Evert; (Australia) Wendy Turnbull; 6–4, 6–3 | (United States) Elise Burgin; (South Africa) Rosalyn Fairbank | (United States) Beverly Bowes-Hackney (United States) Kathy Rinaldi | (Peru) Laura Gildemeister (United States) Terry Phelps (United States) Ronni Reis (Brazil) Gisele Miró |
| 27 Apr | Singapore Open; Singapore; Category 1 Hard – $50,000 – 32S/16D; Singles – Doubles | (Australia) Anne Minter; 6–4, 6–1 | (United States) Barbara Gerken | (Japan) Emiko Okagawa (Japan) Etsuko Kaneshiro | (Belgium) Ann Devries (United States) Cammy MacGregor (United Kingdom) Annabel Croft (West Germany) Claudia Porwik |
| 27 Apr | Singapore Open; Singapore; Category 1 Hard – $50,000 – 32S/16D; Singles – Doubles | (United States) Anna-Maria Fernandez (Australia) Julie Richardson; 6–1, 6–4 | (United States) Barbara Gerken (United States) Heather Ludloff | (Japan) Emiko Okagawa (Japan) Etsuko Kaneshiro | (Belgium) Ann Devries (United States) Cammy MacGregor (United Kingdom) Annabel Croft (West Germany) Claudia Porwik |

=== May ===
| Week | Tournament | Champions | Runners-up | Semifinalists | Quarterfinalists |
|---|---|---|---|---|---|
| 4 May | Italian Open; Rome, Italy; Category 3 Clay – $150,000 – 56S/32D; Singles – Doubles | (West Germany) Steffi Graf; 7–5, 4–6, 6–0 | (Argentina) Gabriela Sabatini | (United States) Martina Navratilova (Czechoslovakia) Helena Suková | (West Germany) Claudia Kohde-Kilsch (Spain) Arantxa Sánchez Vicario (Austria) Judith Polz (Argentina) Bettina Fulco |
| 4 May | Italian Open; Rome, Italy; Category 3 Clay – $150,000 – 56S/32D; Singles – Doubles | (United States) Martina Navratilova (Argentina) Gabriela Sabatini; 6–4, 6–1 | (West Germany) Claudia Kohde-Kilsch; (Czechoslovakia) Helena Suková | (United States) Martina Navratilova (Czechoslovakia) Helena Suková | (West Germany) Claudia Kohde-Kilsch (Spain) Arantxa Sánchez Vicario (Austria) Judith Polz (Argentina) Bettina Fulco |
| 11 May | Fila German Open; West Berlin, West Germany; Category 3 Clay – $150,000 – 56S/28D | (West Germany) Steffi Graf; 6–2, 6–3 | (West Germany) Claudia Kohde-Kilsch | (Italy) Sandra Cecchini (Argentina) Patricia Tarabini | (France) Nathalie Tauziat (Australia) Louise Field (Italy) Raffaella Reggi (Australia) Nicole Provis |
| 11 May | Fila German Open; West Berlin, West Germany; Category 3 Clay – $150,000 – 56S/28D | (West Germany) Claudia Kohde-Kilsch (Czechoslovakia) Helena Suková; 6–1, 6–2 | (Sweden) Catarina Lindqvist (Denmark) Tine Scheuer-Larsen | (Italy) Sandra Cecchini (Argentina) Patricia Tarabini | (France) Nathalie Tauziat (Australia) Louise Field (Italy) Raffaella Reggi (Australia) Nicole Provis |
| 18 May | European Open; Geneva, Switzerland; Category 2 Clay – $100,000 – 56S/32D; Singles – Doubles | (United States) Chris Evert; 6–3, 4–6, 6–2 | (Bulgaria) Manuela Maleeva | (United States) Lori McNeil (Italy) Raffaella Reggi | (United States) Mary Joe Fernández (Argentina) Mariana Pérez Roldán (Bulgaria) Katerina Maleeva (Czechoslovakia) Iva Budařová |
| 18 May | European Open; Geneva, Switzerland; Category 2 Clay – $100,000 – 56S/32D; Singles – Doubles | (United States) Betsy Nagelsen (Australia) Elizabeth Smylie; 4–6, 6–4, 6–3 | (Peru) Laura Gildemeister (France) Catherine Tanvier | (United States) Lori McNeil (Italy) Raffaella Reggi | (United States) Mary Joe Fernández (Argentina) Mariana Pérez Roldán (Bulgaria) Katerina Maleeva (Czechoslovakia) Iva Budařová |
| 18 May | Grand Prix de Strasbourg; Strasbourg, France; Category 1+ Clay – $75,000 – 32S/15D; Singles – Doubles | (Canada) Carling Bassett; 6–3, 6–4 | (Italy) Sandra Cecchini | (United States) Kathleen Horvath (France) Nathalie Tauziat | (West Germany) Isabel Cueto (United States) Elise Burgin (Romania) Virginia Ruzici (United States) Terry Phelps |
| 18 May | Grand Prix de Strasbourg; Strasbourg, France; Category 1+ Clay – $75,000 – 32S/15D; Singles – Doubles | (Czechoslovakia) Jana Novotná (France) Catherine Suire; 6–0, 6–2 | (United States) Kathleen Horvath (Netherlands) Marcella Mesker | (United States) Kathleen Horvath (France) Nathalie Tauziat | (West Germany) Isabel Cueto (United States) Elise Burgin (Romania) Virginia Ruzici (United States) Terry Phelps |
| 25 May; 1 Jun | French Open; Paris, France; Grand Slam; Clay – $1,325,000 – 128S/64D/64X; Singles – Doubles – Mixed doubles | (West Germany) Steffi Graf; 6–4, 4–6, 8–6 | (United States) Martina Navratilova | (United States) Chris Evert (Argentina) Gabriela Sabatini | (West Germany) Claudia Kohde-Kilsch (Italy) Raffaella Reggi (Spain) Arantxa Sánchez Vicario (Bulgaria) Manuela Maleeva |
| 25 May; 1 Jun | French Open; Paris, France; Grand Slam; Clay – $1,325,000 – 128S/64D/64X; Singles – Doubles – Mixed doubles | (United States) Martina Navratilova (United States) Pam Shriver; 6–2, 6–1 | (West Germany) Steffi Graf (Argentina) Gabriela Sabatini | (United States) Chris Evert (Argentina) Gabriela Sabatini | (West Germany) Claudia Kohde-Kilsch (Italy) Raffaella Reggi (Spain) Arantxa Sánchez Vicario (Bulgaria) Manuela Maleeva |
| 25 May; 1 Jun | French Open; Paris, France; Grand Slam; Clay – $1,325,000 – 128S/64D/64X; Singles – Doubles – Mixed doubles | (United States) Pam Shriver (Spain) Emilio Sánchez; 6–3, 7–6^{(7–5)} | (United States) Lori McNeil (United States) Sherwood Stewart | (United States) Chris Evert (Argentina) Gabriela Sabatini | (West Germany) Claudia Kohde-Kilsch (Italy) Raffaella Reggi (Spain) Arantxa Sánchez Vicario (Bulgaria) Manuela Maleeva |

=== June ===
| Week | Tournament | Champions | Runners-up | Semifinalists | Quarterfinalists |
|---|---|---|---|---|---|
| 8 Jun | Dow Chemical Classic; Birmingham, Great Britain; Category 2 Grass – $125,000 – 56S/32D; Singles | (United States) Pam Shriver; 4–6, 6–2, 6–2 | (Soviet Union) Larisa Savchenko | (Japan) Etsuko Inoue (West Germany) Eva Pfaff | (France) Nathalie Tauziat (Canada) Carling Bassett (Australia) Elizabeth Smylie (South Africa) Rosalyn Fairbank |
| 8 Jun | Dow Chemical Classic; Birmingham, Great Britain; Category 2 Grass – $125,000 – 56S/32D; Singles | Cancelled due to rain | | (Japan) Etsuko Inoue (West Germany) Eva Pfaff | (France) Nathalie Tauziat (Canada) Carling Bassett (Australia) Elizabeth Smylie (South Africa) Rosalyn Fairbank |
| 15 Jun | Pilkington Glass Ladies Championships; Eastbourne, Great Britain; Category 4 Grass – $200,000 – 64S/32D; Singles – Doubles | (Czechoslovakia) Helena Suková; 7–6^{(7–5)}, 6–3 | (United States) Martina Navratilova | (United States) Pam Shriver (United States) Chris Evert | (France) Isabelle Demongeot (Argentina) Gabriela Sabatini (South Africa) Rosalyn Fairbank (Soviet Union) Larisa Savchenko |
| 15 Jun | Pilkington Glass Ladies Championships; Eastbourne, Great Britain; Category 4 Grass – $200,000 – 64S/32D; Singles – Doubles | (Soviet Union) Svetlana Parkhomenko (Soviet Union) Larisa Savchenko; 7–6^{(7–5)}, 4–6, 7–5 | (South Africa) Rosalyn Fairbank (Australia) Elizabeth Smylie | (United States) Pam Shriver (United States) Chris Evert | (France) Isabelle Demongeot (Argentina) Gabriela Sabatini (South Africa) Rosalyn Fairbank (Soviet Union) Larisa Savchenko |
| 22 Jun; 29 Jun | Wimbledon Championships; London, Great Britain; Grand Slam; Grass – $1,467,542 – 128S/64D/64X; Singles – Doubles – Mixed doubles | (United States) Martina Navratilova; 7–5, 6–3 | (West Germany) Steffi Graf | (United States) Chris Evert (United States) Pam Shriver | (Australia) Dianne Balestrat (West Germany) Claudia Kohde-Kilsch (Czechoslovakia) Helena Suková (Argentina) Gabriela Sabatini |
| 22 Jun; 29 Jun | Wimbledon Championships; London, Great Britain; Grand Slam; Grass – $1,467,542 – 128S/64D/64X; Singles – Doubles – Mixed doubles | (West Germany) Claudia Kohde-Kilsch (Czechoslovakia) Helena Suková; 7–5, 7–5 | (United States) Betsy Nagelsen (Australia) Elizabeth Smylie | (United States) Chris Evert (United States) Pam Shriver | (Australia) Dianne Balestrat (West Germany) Claudia Kohde-Kilsch (Czechoslovakia) Helena Suková (Argentina) Gabriela Sabatini |
| 22 Jun; 29 Jun | Wimbledon Championships; London, Great Britain; Grand Slam; Grass – $1,467,542 – 128S/64D/64X; Singles – Doubles – Mixed doubles | (United Kingdom) Jo Durie (United Kingdom) Jeremy Bates; 7–6^{(12–10)}, 6–3 | (Australia) Nicole Provis (Australia) Darren Cahill | (United States) Chris Evert (United States) Pam Shriver | (Australia) Dianne Balestrat (West Germany) Claudia Kohde-Kilsch (Czechoslovakia) Helena Suková (Argentina) Gabriela Sabatini |

=== July ===
| Week | Tournament | Champions | Runners-up | Semifinalists | Quarterfinalists |
|---|---|---|---|---|---|
| 6 Jul | Volvo Ladies Open; Båstad, Sweden; Category 1+ Clay – $75,000 – 32S/16D | (Italy) Sandra Cecchini; 6–4, 6–4 | (Sweden) Catarina Lindqvist | (Austria) Judith Wiesner (Bulgaria) Katerina Maleeva | (Argentina) Adriana Villagrán (Sweden) Carina Karlsson (Norway) Amy Jönsson (Denmark) Tine Scheuer-Larsen |
| 6 Jul | Volvo Ladies Open; Båstad, Sweden; Category 1+ Clay – $75,000 – 32S/16D | (United States) Penny Barg; (Denmark) Tine Scheuer-Larsen; 6–1, 6–2 | (Italy) Sandra Cecchini; (Argentina) Patricia Tarabini | (Austria) Judith Wiesner (Bulgaria) Katerina Maleeva | (Argentina) Adriana Villagrán (Sweden) Carina Karlsson (Norway) Amy Jönsson (Denmark) Tine Scheuer-Larsen |
| 6 Jul | Belgian Ladies Open; Knokke-Le-Zoute, Belgium; Category 1+ Clay – $75,000 – 32S/16D; Singles – Doubles | (United States) Kathleen Horvath; 6–1, 7–6^{(7–5)} | (West Germany) Bettina Bunge | (Italy) Laura Garrone (France) Nathalie Herreman | (Italy) Federica Bonsignori (Belgium) Ann Devries (Argentina) Mercedes Paz (West Germany) Isabel Cueto |
| 6 Jul | Belgian Ladies Open; Knokke-Le-Zoute, Belgium; Category 1+ Clay – $75,000 – 32S/16D; Singles – Doubles | (West Germany) Bettina Bunge; (Bulgaria) Manuela Maleeva; 4–6, 6–4, 6–3 | (United States) Kathleen Horvath; (Netherlands) Marcella Mesker | (Italy) Laura Garrone (France) Nathalie Herreman | (Italy) Federica Bonsignori (Belgium) Ann Devries (Argentina) Mercedes Paz (West Germany) Isabel Cueto |
| 13 Jul | Virginia Slims of Newport; Newport, United States; Category 3 Grass – $150,000 – 32S/16D | (United States) Pam Shriver; 6–2, 6–4 | (United States) Wendy White | (United States) Alycia Moulton (South Africa) Rosalyn Fairbank | (United States) Gigi Fernández (United States) Terry Phelps (United States) Heather Ludloff (United States) Lori McNeil |
| 13 Jul | Virginia Slims of Newport; Newport, United States; Category 3 Grass – $150,000 – 32S/16D | (United States) Gigi Fernández (United States) Lori McNeil; 7–6^{(7–5)}, 7–5 | (United Kingdom) Anne Hobbs; (United States) Kathy Jordan | (United States) Alycia Moulton (South Africa) Rosalyn Fairbank | (United States) Gigi Fernández (United States) Terry Phelps (United States) Heather Ludloff (United States) Lori McNeil |
| 20 Jul | Fed Cup; Vancouver, Canada; Team event Hard | West Germany; 2–1 | United States | Bulgaria; Czechoslovakia | Great Britain; Australia; Argentina; Canada |
| 27 Jul | Women's California State Championships; Aptos, United States; Category 1 Hard – $50,000 – 32S/16D | (United States) Elly Hakami; 6–3, 6–4 | (United States) Melissa Gurney | (Argentina) Mariana Pérez Roldán (United States) Terry Phelps | (United States) Penny Barg (United States) Susan Mascarin (United States) Kathy Jordan (United States) Cammy MacGregor |
| 27 Jul | Women's California State Championships; Aptos, United States; Category 1 Hard – $50,000 – 32S/16D | (United States) Kathy Jordan; (United States) Robin White; 6–1, 6–0 | (United States) Lea Antonoplis (United States) Barbara Gerken | (Argentina) Mariana Pérez Roldán (United States) Terry Phelps | (United States) Penny Barg (United States) Susan Mascarin (United States) Kathy Jordan (United States) Cammy MacGregor |

=== August ===
| Week | Tournament | Champions | Runners-up | Semifinalists | Quarterfinalists |
|---|---|---|---|---|---|
| 3 Aug | Virginia Slims of San Diego; San Diego, United States; Category 1+ Hard – $75,000 – 56S/28D; Singles – Doubles | (Italy) Raffaella Reggi; 6–0, 6–4 | (Australia) Anne Minter | (United States) Lori McNeil (France) Nathalie Tauziat | (United States) Elly Hakami (France) Nathalie Herreman (France) Isabelle Demongeot (United States) Kate Gompert |
| 3 Aug | Virginia Slims of San Diego; San Diego, United States; Category 1+ Hard – $75,000 – 56S/28D; Singles – Doubles | (Czechoslovakia) Jana Novotná; (France) Catherine Suire; 6–3, 6–4 | (United States) Elise Burgin; (United States) Sharon Walsh | (United States) Lori McNeil (France) Nathalie Tauziat | (United States) Elly Hakami (France) Nathalie Herreman (France) Isabelle Demongeot (United States) Kate Gompert |
| 10 Aug | Virginia Slims of Los Angeles; Manhattan Beach, United States; Category 4 Hard – $250,000 – 56S/28D | (West Germany) Steffi Graf; 6–3, 6–4 | (United States) Chris Evert | (Argentina) Gabriela Sabatini (United States) Martina Navratilova | (United States) Elly Hakami (United States) Lori McNeil (Czechoslovakia) Hana Mandlíková (West Germany) Bettina Bunge |
| 10 Aug | Virginia Slims of Los Angeles; Manhattan Beach, United States; Category 4 Hard – $250,000 – 56S/28D | (United States) Martina Navratilova; (United States) Pam Shriver; 6–3, 6–4 | (United States) Zina Garrison; (United States) Lori McNeil | (Argentina) Gabriela Sabatini (United States) Martina Navratilova | (United States) Elly Hakami (United States) Lori McNeil (Czechoslovakia) Hana Mandlíková (West Germany) Bettina Bunge |
| 17 Aug | Canadian Open; Toronto, Canada; Category 4 Hard – $250,000 – 56S/32D | (United States) Pam Shriver; 6–4, 6–1 | (United States) Zina Garrison | (United States) Chris Evert (West Germany) Bettina Bunge | (Canada) Helen Kelesi (Argentina) Gabriela Sabatini (Australia) Anne Minter; (United States) Barbara Potter |
| 17 Aug | Canadian Open; Toronto, Canada; Category 4 Hard – $250,000 – 56S/32D | (United States) Zina Garrison; (United States) Lori McNeil; 6–1, 6–2 | (West Germany) Claudia Kohde-Kilsch; (Czechoslovakia) Helena Suková | (United States) Chris Evert (West Germany) Bettina Bunge | (Canada) Helen Kelesi (Argentina) Gabriela Sabatini (Australia) Anne Minter; (United States) Barbara Potter |
| 24 Aug | United Jersey Bank Classic; Mahwah, United States; Category 3 Hard – $150,000 – 28S/16D | (Bulgaria) Manuela Maleeva; 1–6, 6–4, 6–1 | (West Germany) Sylvia Hanika | (Bulgaria) Katerina Maleeva (United States) Lori McNeil | (Czechoslovakia) Helena Suková (Italy) Raffaella Reggi (Sweden) Catarina Lindqvist; (Australia) Dianne Balestrat |
| 24 Aug | United Jersey Bank Classic; Mahwah, United States; Category 3 Hard – $150,000 – 28S/16D | (United States) Gigi Fernández; (United States) Lori McNeil; 6–3, 6–2 | (United Kingdom) Anne Hobbs; (Australia) Elizabeth Smylie | (Bulgaria) Katerina Maleeva (United States) Lori McNeil | (Czechoslovakia) Helena Suková (Italy) Raffaella Reggi (Sweden) Catarina Lindqvist; (Australia) Dianne Balestrat |
| 31 Augt; 7 Sep | US Open; New York City, United States; Grand Slam; Hard – $1,666,667 – 128S/64D/32X; Singles – Doubles – Mixed doubles | (United States) Martina Navratilova; 7–6^{(7–4)}, 6–1 | (West Germany) Steffi Graf | (United States) Lori McNeil (Czechoslovakia) Helena Suková | (United States) Pam Shriver (United States) Chris Evert (West Germany) Claudia Kohde-Kilsch (Argentina) Gabriela Sabatini |
| 31 Augt; 7 Sep | US Open; New York City, United States; Grand Slam; Hard – $1,666,667 – 128S/64D/32X; Singles – Doubles – Mixed doubles | (United States) Martina Navratilova; (United States) Pam Shriver; 5–7, 6–4, 6–2 | (United States) Kathy Jordan; (Australia) Elizabeth Smylie | (United States) Lori McNeil (Czechoslovakia) Helena Suková | (United States) Pam Shriver (United States) Chris Evert (West Germany) Claudia Kohde-Kilsch (Argentina) Gabriela Sabatini |
| 31 Augt; 7 Sep | US Open; New York City, United States; Grand Slam; Hard – $1,666,667 – 128S/64D/32X; Singles – Doubles – Mixed doubles | (United States) Martina Navratilova; (Spain) Emilio Sánchez Vicario; 6–4, 6–7^{(6–8)}, 7–6^{(14–12)} | (United States) Betsy Nagelsen (United States) Paul Annacone | (United States) Lori McNeil (Czechoslovakia) Helena Suková | (United States) Pam Shriver (United States) Chris Evert (West Germany) Claudia Kohde-Kilsch (Argentina) Gabriela Sabatini |

=== September ===
| Week | Tournament | Champions | Runners-up | Semifinalists | Quarterfinalists |
|---|---|---|---|---|---|
| 14 Sep | Pan Pacific Open; Tokyo, Japan; Category 4 Carpet (i) – $250,000 – 28S/16D | (Argentina) Gabriela Sabatini; 6–4, 7–6^{(8–6)} | (Bulgaria) Manuela Maleeva | (Bulgaria) Katerina Maleeva (Sweden) Catarina Lindqvist | (Japan) Etsuko Inoue (Australia) Dianne Balestrat (United States) Barbara Potter (United States) Marianne Werdel |
| 14 Sep | Pan Pacific Open; Tokyo, Japan; Category 4 Carpet (i) – $250,000 – 28S/16D | (United States) Anne White; (United States) Robin White; 6–1, 6–2 | (Bulgaria) Katerina Maleeva; (Bulgaria) Manuela Maleeva | (Bulgaria) Katerina Maleeva (Sweden) Catarina Lindqvist | (Japan) Etsuko Inoue (Australia) Dianne Balestrat (United States) Barbara Potter (United States) Marianne Werdel |
| 21 Sep | Citizen Cup; Hamburg, West Germany; Category 3 Clay – $150,000 – 56S/28D; Singles – Doubles | (West Germany) Steffi Graf; 6–2, 6–2 | (West Germany) Isabel Cueto | (Italy) Sandra Cecchini (United States) Kathleen Horvath | (West Germany) Wiltrud Probst (Italy) Raffaella Reggi (Socialist Federal Republic of Yugoslavia) Sabrina Goleš (Poland) Iwona Kuczyńska |
| 21 Sep | Citizen Cup; Hamburg, West Germany; Category 3 Clay – $150,000 – 56S/28D; Singles – Doubles | (West Germany) Claudia Kohde-Kilsch; (Czechoslovakia) Jana Novotná; 7–6^{(7–1)}, 7–6^{(8–6)} | (Soviet Union) Natalia Bykova; (Soviet Union) Leila Meskhi | (Italy) Sandra Cecchini (United States) Kathleen Horvath | (West Germany) Wiltrud Probst (Italy) Raffaella Reggi (Socialist Federal Republic of Yugoslavia) Sabrina Goleš (Poland) Iwona Kuczyńska |
| 28 Sep | Virginia Slims of New Orleans; New Orleans, United States; Category 3 Carpet (i) – $150,000 – 32S/16D | (United States) Chris Evert; 6–3, 7–5 | (United States) Lori McNeil | (Australia) Wendy Turnbull (United States) Zina Garrison | (United States) Anne Smith (United States) Robin White (United States) Kate Gompert (United States) Marianne Werdel |
| 28 Sep | Virginia Slims of New Orleans; New Orleans, United States; Category 3 Carpet (i) – $150,000 – 32S/16D | (United States) Zina Garrison; (United States) Lori McNeil; 6–3, 6–3 | (United States) Peanut Louie-Harper (United States) Heather Ludloff | (Australia) Wendy Turnbull (United States) Zina Garrison | (United States) Anne Smith (United States) Robin White (United States) Kate Gompert (United States) Marianne Werdel |
| 28 Sep | Clarins Open; Paris, France; Category 1+ Clay – $75,000 – 32S/16D | (Socialist Federal Republic of Yugoslavia) Sabrina Goleš; 7–5, 6–1 | (Belgium) Sandra Wasserman | (United States) Michelle Torres (Italy) Federica Bonsignori | (Italy) Raffaella Reggi (Czechoslovakia) Hana Fukárková (Italy) Sandra Cecchini (United States) Brenda Schultz |
| 28 Sep | Clarins Open; Paris, France; Category 1+ Clay – $75,000 – 32S/16D | (France) Isabelle Demongeot (France) Nathalie Tauziat; 1–6, 6–3, 6–3 | (Italy) Sandra Cecchini; (Socialist Federal Republic of Yugoslavia) Sabrina Goleš | (United States) Michelle Torres (Italy) Federica Bonsignori | (Italy) Raffaella Reggi (Czechoslovakia) Hana Fukárková (Italy) Sandra Cecchini (United States) Brenda Schultz |

=== October ===
| Week | Tournament | Champions | Runners-up | Semifinalists | Quarterfinalists |
|---|---|---|---|---|---|
| 5 Oct | Athens Trophy; Athens, Greece; Category 1+ Clay – $75,000 – 32S/16D/32Q; Singles – Doubles | (Bulgaria) Katerina Maleeva; 6–1, 6–0 | (France) Julie Halard | (West Germany) Isabel Cueto (Austria) Judith Wiesner | (France) Alexia Dechaume (Soviet Union) Leila Meskhi (Argentina) Patricia Tarabini (Greece) Olga Tsarbopoulou |
| 5 Oct | Athens Trophy; Athens, Greece; Category 1+ Clay – $75,000 – 32S/16D/32Q; Singles – Doubles | (West Germany) Andrea Betzner (Austria) Judith Wiesner; 6–4, 7–6^{(7–0)} | (United States) Kathleen Horvath (South Africa) Dinky Van Rensburg | (West Germany) Isabel Cueto (Austria) Judith Wiesner | (France) Alexia Dechaume (Soviet Union) Leila Meskhi (Argentina) Patricia Tarabini (Greece) Olga Tsarbopoulou |
| 12 Oct | Porsche Tennis Grand Prix; Filderstadt, West Germany; Category 3 Carpet (i) – $175,000 – 32S/16D/32Q; Singles – Doubles | (United States) Martina Navratilova; 7–5, 6–1 | (United States) Chris Evert | (Argentina) Gabriela Sabatini (United States) Pam Shriver | (United States) Lori McNeil (Czechoslovakia) Helena Suková (United States) Zina Garrison (United States) Mary Joe Fernández |
| 12 Oct | Porsche Tennis Grand Prix; Filderstadt, West Germany; Category 3 Carpet (i) – $175,000 – 32S/16D/32Q; Singles – Doubles | (United States) Martina Navratilova; (United States) Pam Shriver; 6–1, 6–2 | (United States) Zina Garrison; (United States) Lori McNeil | (Argentina) Gabriela Sabatini (United States) Pam Shriver | (United States) Lori McNeil (Czechoslovakia) Helena Suková (United States) Zina Garrison (United States) Mary Joe Fernández |
| 12 Oct | Honda Classic; San Juan, Puerto Rico; Category 1+ Hard – $75,000 – 56S/24D; Singles – Doubles | (United States) Stephanie Rehe; 7–5, 7–6^{(7–4)} | (United States) Camille Benjamin | (Peru) Pilar Vásquez (Australia) Elizabeth Minter | (Australia) Wendy Turnbull (United States) Cammy MacGregor (United States) Niurka Sodupe (United States) Elly Hakami |
| 12 Oct | Honda Classic; San Juan, Puerto Rico; Category 1+ Hard – $75,000 – 56S/24D; Singles – Doubles | (South Africa) Lise Gregory; (United States) Ronni Reis; 7–5, 7–5 | (United States) Cammy MacGregor; (United States) Cynthia MacGregor | (Peru) Pilar Vásquez (Australia) Elizabeth Minter | (Australia) Wendy Turnbull (United States) Cammy MacGregor (United States) Niurka Sodupe (United States) Elly Hakami |
| 19 Oct | Volvo Classic; Brighton, Great Britain; Category 4 Carpet (i) – $200,000 – 32S/16D | (Argentina) Gabriela Sabatini; 7–5, 6–4 | (United States) Pam Shriver | (United States) Kathy Jordan (Czechoslovakia) Helena Suková | (Italy) Sandra Cecchini (Bulgaria) Katerina Maleeva (West Germany) Sylvia Hanika (West Germany) Bettina Bunge |
| 19 Oct | Volvo Classic; Brighton, Great Britain; Category 4 Carpet (i) – $200,000 – 32S/16D | (United States) Kathy Jordan; (Czechoslovakia) Helena Suková; 7–5, 6–1 | (Denmark) Tine Scheuer-Larsen; (France) Catherine Tanvier | (United States) Kathy Jordan (Czechoslovakia) Helena Suková | (Italy) Sandra Cecchini (Bulgaria) Katerina Maleeva (West Germany) Sylvia Hanika (West Germany) Bettina Bunge |
| 26 Oct | European Indoors; Zürich, Switzerland; Category 3 Carpet (i) – $150,000 – 32S/16D | (West Germany) Steffi Graf; 6–2, 6–2 | (Czechoslovakia) Hana Mandlíková | (Bulgaria) Manuela Maleeva (France) Nathalie Tauziat | (Bulgaria) Katerina Maleeva (Italy) Raffaella Reggi (United States) Christina Singer (Austria) Judith Wiesner |
| 26 Oct | European Indoors; Zürich, Switzerland; Category 3 Carpet (i) – $150,000 – 32S/16D | (France) Nathalie Herreman; (France) Pascale Paradis; 6–3, 2–6, 6–3 | (Czechoslovakia) Jana Novotná; (France) Catherine Suire | (Bulgaria) Manuela Maleeva (France) Nathalie Tauziat | (Bulgaria) Katerina Maleeva (Italy) Raffaella Reggi (United States) Christina Singer (Austria) Judith Wiesner |
| 26 Oct | Virginia Slims of Indianapolis; Indianapolis, United States; Category 1+ Hard – $75,000 – 56S/28D/32Q; Singles – Doubles | (United States) Halle Cioffi; 4–6, 6–4, 7–6^{(12–10)} | (United States) Anne Smith | (Soviet Union) Leila Meskhi (United States) Hu Na | (United States) Barbara Potter (United States) Terry Phelps (United States) Gretchen Magers (United States) Elly Hakami |
| 26 Oct | Virginia Slims of Indianapolis; Indianapolis, United States; Category 1+ Hard – $75,000 – 56S/28D/32Q; Singles – Doubles | (Australia) Jenny Byrne; (Australia) Michelle Jaggard; 6–2, 6–3 | (United States) Beverly Bowes; (United States) Hu Na | (Soviet Union) Leila Meskhi (United States) Hu Na | (United States) Barbara Potter (United States) Terry Phelps (United States) Gretchen Magers (United States) Elly Hakami |

=== November ===
| Week | Tournament | Champions | Runners-up | Semifinalists | Quarterfinalists |
|---|---|---|---|---|---|
| 2 Nov | Virginia Slims of New England; Worcester, United States; Category 4 $250,000 – hard (i) – 32S/16D | (United States) Pam Shriver; 6–4, 4–6, 6–0 | (United States) Chris Evert | (Argentina) Gabriela Sabatini (Czechoslovakia) Helena Suková | (United States) Barbara Potter (United States) Lori McNeil (West Germany) Eva Pfaff (West Germany) Bettina Bunge |
| 2 Nov | Virginia Slims of New England; Worcester, United States; Category 4 $250,000 – hard (i) – 32S/16D | (United States) Elise Burgin; (South Africa) Rosalyn Fairbank; 6–4, 6–4 | (West Germany) Bettina Bunge; (West Germany) Eva Pfaff | (Argentina) Gabriela Sabatini (Czechoslovakia) Helena Suková | (United States) Barbara Potter (United States) Lori McNeil (West Germany) Eva Pfaff (West Germany) Bettina Bunge |
| 2 Nov | Virginia Slims of Arkansas; Little Rock, United States; Category 1+ Carpet (i) – $75,000 – 32S/16D | (Italy) Sandra Cecchini; 0–6, 6–1, 6–3 | (Soviet Union) Natasha Zvereva | (United Kingdom) Anne Smith (Soviet Union) Larisa Savchenko | (United States) Niurka Sodupe (United States) Susan Sloane (United States) Barbara Gerken (Netherlands) Manon Bollegraf |
| 2 Nov | Virginia Slims of Arkansas; Little Rock, United States; Category 1+ Carpet (i) – $75,000 – 32S/16D | (United States) Mary Lou Daniels (United States) Robin White; 6–2, 6–4 | (United States) Lea Antonoplis; (Brazil) Barbara Gerken | (United Kingdom) Anne Smith (Soviet Union) Larisa Savchenko | (United States) Niurka Sodupe (United States) Susan Sloane (United States) Barbara Gerken (Netherlands) Manon Bollegraf |
| 9 Nov | Virginia Slims of Chicago; Chicago, United States; Category 3 Carpet (i) – $150,000 – 32S/16D/28Q; Singles – Doubles | (United States) Martina Navratilova; 6–1, 6–2 | (Soviet Union) Natasha Zvereva | (Czechoslovakia) Helena Suková (United States) Barbara Potter | (United States) Lori McNeil (Soviet Union) Leila Meskhi: (United States) Zina Garrison; (United States) Kate Gompert |
| 9 Nov | Virginia Slims of Chicago; Chicago, United States; Category 3 Carpet (i) – $150,000 – 32S/16D/28Q; Singles – Doubles | (West Germany) Claudia Kohde-Kilsch; (Czechoslovakia) Helena Suková; 6–4, 6–3 | (United States) Zina Garrison; (United States) Lori McNeil | (Czechoslovakia) Helena Suková (United States) Barbara Potter | (United States) Lori McNeil (Soviet Union) Leila Meskhi: (United States) Zina Garrison; (United States) Kate Gompert |
| 16 Nov | Virginia Slims Championships; New York City, United States; Carpet (i) – $1,000,000 – 16S/8D; Singles – Doubles | (West Germany) Steffi Graf; 4–6, 6–4, 6–0, 6–4 | (Argentina) Gabriela Sabatini | (Bulgaria) Manuela Maleeva (West Germany) Sylvia Hanika | (Czechoslovakia) Helena Suková (Italy) Raffaella Reggi: (United States) Pam Shriver (United States) Martina Navratilova |
| 16 Nov | Virginia Slims Championships; New York City, United States; Carpet (i) – $1,000,000 – 16S/8D; Singles – Doubles | (United States) Martina Navratilova; (United States) Pam Shriver; 6–1, 6–1 | (West Germany) Claudia Kohde-Kilsch; (Czechoslovakia) Helena Suková | (Bulgaria) Manuela Maleeva (West Germany) Sylvia Hanika | (Czechoslovakia) Helena Suková (Italy) Raffaella Reggi: (United States) Pam Shriver (United States) Martina Navratilova |

== Rankings ==
=== WTA ===
Below are the 1987 WTA year-end rankings (December 20, 1987) in both singles and doubles competition:

Singles year-end ranking
| No | Player Name | Points | 1986 | Change |
| 1 | Steffi Graf (FRG) | 280.2080 | 3 | +2 |
| 2 | Martina Navratilova (USA) | 231.2121 | 1 | -1 |
| 3 | Chris Evert (USA) | 165.7604 | 2 | -1 |
| 4 | Pam Shriver (USA) | 137.2733 | 5 | +1 |
| 5 | Hana Mandlíková (TCH) | 120.9609 | 4 | -1 |
| 6 | Gabriela Sabatini (ARG) | 113.5794 | 9 | +3 |
| 7 | Helena Suková (TCH) | 82.3588 | 6 | -1 |
| 8 | Manuela Maleeva (BUL) | 83.1363 | 10 | +2 |
| 9 | Zina Garrison (USA) | 80.9110 | 11 | +2 |
| 10 | Claudia Kohde-Kilsch (FRG) | 65.7789 | 7 | -3 |
| 11 | Lori McNeil (USA) | 63.6892 | 14 | +3 |
| 12 | Barbara Potter (USA) | 47.0714 | 26 | +14 |
| 13 | Katerina Maleeva (BUL) | 45.9723 | 29 | +16 |
| 14 | Sylvia Hanika (FRG) | 44.2456 | 50 | +36 |
| 15 | Bettina Bunge (FRG) | 42.2357 | 12 | -3 |
| 16 | Catarina Lindqvist (SWE) | 40.3608 | 17 | +1 |
| 17 | Raffaella Reggi (ITA) | 37.2617 | 22 | +5 |
| 18 | Sandra Cecchini (ITA) | 35.9211 | 73 | +55 |
| 19 | Natasha Zvereva (URS) | 34.3462 | 94 | +75 |
| 20 | Mary Joe Fernández (USA) | 34.1071 | 27 | +7 |

Doubles year-end ranking
| No | Player Name | Points | 1986 | Change |
| 1 | Martina Navratilova (USA) | 561.6961 | 1 | = |
| 2 | Pam Shriver (USA) | 476.5971 | 2 | = |
| 3 | Claudia Kohde-Kilsch (FRG) | 278.0561 | 5 | -2 |
| 4 | Lori McNeil (USA) | 245.4736 | 28 | +24 |
| 5 | Gabriela Sabatini (ARG) | 238.1553 | 9 | +4 |
| 6 | Helena Suková (TCH) | 233.1087 | 3 | -3 |
| 7 | Zina Garrison (USA) | 228.2632 | 18 | +11 |
| 8 | Elizabeth Smylie (AUS) | 209.6313 | 8 | = |
| 9 | Svetlana Parkhomenko (URS) | 193.1015 | 27 | +18 |
| 10 | Kathy Jordan (USA) | 189.7692 | 10 | = |
| 11 | Larisa Savchenko (URS) | 187.2215 | 26 | +15 |
| 12 | Hana Mandlíková (TCH) | 184.5000 | 7 | -5 |
| 13 | Steffi Graf (FRG) | 178.2675 | 4 | -9 |
| 14 | Betsy Nagelsen (USA) | 163.0163 | 15 | +1 |
| 15 | Wendy Turnbull (AUS) | 160.0000 | 6 | -9 |
| 16 | Elise Burgin (USA) | 152.3002 | 11 | -5 |
| 17 | Robin White (USA) | 143.9266 | 22 | +5 |
| 18 | Anne Hobbs (GBR) | 139.2727 | 36 | +18 |
| 19 | Rosalyn Fairbank (RSA) | 133.8172 | 12 | -7 |
| 20 | Gigi Fernández (USA) | 132.0368 | 17 | -3 |

=== Virginia Slims ===
Singles year-end ranking
| # | Player | Points | #Trn |
|---|---|---|---|
| 1 | Steffi Graf (FRG) | 5,455 | 13 |
| 2 | Martina Navratilova (USA) | 4,084 | 12 |
| 3 | Chris Evert (USA) | 3,901 | 18 |
| 4 | Pam Shriver (USA) | 3,426 | 17 |
| 5 | Gabriela Sabatini (ARG) | 3,296 | 19 |
| 6 | Helena Suková (TCH) | 2,934 | 22 |
| 7 | Hana Mandlíková (TCH) | 2,639 | 17 |
| 8 | Lori McNeil (USA) | 2,331 | 24 |
| 9 | Zina Garrison (USA) | 2,274 | 19 |
| 10 | Manuela Maleeva (BUL) | 2,182 | 18 |
| 11 | Claudia Kohde-Kilsch (FRG) | 1,626 | 17 |
| 12 | Sylvia Hanika (FRG) | 1,454 | 19 |
| 13 | Raffaella Reggi (ITA) | 1,332 | 22 |
| 14 | Catarina Lindqvist (SWE) | 1,260 | 21 |
| 15 | Bettina Bunge (FRG) | 1,186 | 19 |
| 16 | Katerina Maleeva (BUL) | 1,174 | 18 |
| 17 | Sandra Cecchini (ITA) | 1,037 | 20 |
| 18 | Barbara Potter (USA) | 909 | 14 |
| 19 | Nathalie Tauziat (FRA) | 874 | 23 |
| 20 | Kate Gompert (USA) | 807 | 18 |

== Statistical information ==
=== Titles won by player ===
These tables present the number of singles (S), doubles (D), and mixed doubles (X) titles won by each player and each nation during the season, within all the tournament categories of the 1987 Virginia Slims World Championship Series: the Grand Slam tournaments, the Year-end championships and regular events. The players/nations are sorted by:

1. total number of titles (a doubles title won by two players representing the same nation counts as only one win for the nation);
2. highest amount of highest category tournaments (for example, having a single Grand Slam gives preference over any kind of combination without a Grand Slam title);
3. a singles > doubles > mixed doubles hierarchy;
4. alphabetical order (by family names for players).

| Total titles | Player | Grand Slam tournaments | | | Year-end championships | | Regular tournaments | | All titles | | |
| Total titles | Player | Singles | Doubles | Mixed | Singles | Doubles | Singles | Doubles | Singles | Doubles | Mixed |

=== Titles won by nation ===
| Total titles | Country | Grand Slam tournaments | | | Year-end championships | | Regular tournaments | | All titles | | |
| Total titles | Country | Singles | Doubles | Mixed | Singles | Doubles | Singles | Doubles | Singles | Doubles | Mixed |

== See also ==
- 1987 Nabisco Grand Prix
- Women's Tennis Association
- International Tennis Federation
