= 1987 Honda Classic – Singles =

Singles
- 1987 Honda Classic

Final
- Champion: (United States) Stephanie Rehe
- Runner-up: (United States) Camille Benjamin
- Score: 7–5, 7–6^{(7–4)}

Details
- Draw: 56
- Seeds: 14

Events
Singles	Doubles
- Puerto Rico Open

Raffaella Reggi was the defending champion, but she chose to compete at Filderstadt during the same week.

Stephanie Rehe won the title by defeating Camille Benjamin 7–5, 7–6^{(7–4)} in the final.

== Seeds ==
The first eight seeds received a bye to the second round.

1. (Australia) Wendy Turnbull (third round)
2. (United States) Stephanie Rehe (champion)
3. (United States) Gigi Fernández (third round)
4. (Australia) Anne Minter (second round)
5. (United States) Terry Phelps (second round, retired)
6. (United States) Elly Hakami (quarterfinals)
7. (United States) Melissa Gurney (third round)
8. (United States) Michelle Torres (second round)
9. (United States) Camille Benjamin (final)
10. (United States) Kathrin Keil (third round)
11. (Australia) Elizabeth Minter (semifinals)
12. (United States) Vicki Nelson-Dunbar (second round)
13. (Australia) Louise Field (first round)
14. (United States) Beth Herr (second round)

== Draw ==
Key

- Q = Qualifier
- WC = Wild card
- LL = Lucky loser
- Alt = Alternate
- ITF = ITF entry
- PR = Protected ranking
- SR = Special ranking
- SE = Special exempt
- JE = Junior exempt
- JR = Junior Accelerator Programme entrant
- CO = College Accelerator Programme entrant
- NG = Next Gen Accelerator Program entrant
- w/o = Walkover
- r = Retired
- d = Defaulted

=== Finals ===
Quarterfinals
(Peru) Pilar Vásquez	5	6	6
(United States) Penny Barg	7	0	2
9	(United States) Camille Benjamin	4	6	6
(United States) Ronni Reis	6	2	3
11	(Australia) Elizabeth Minter	6	7
(United States) Niurka Sodupe	3	6
6	(United States) Elly Hakami	3	4
2	(United States) Stephanie Rehe	6	6

Semifinals
(Peru) Pilar Vásquez	2	6	5
9	(United States) Camille Benjamin	6	4	7
11	(Australia) Elizabeth Minter	3	1
2	(United States) Stephanie Rehe	6	6

Final
9	(United States) Camille Benjamin	5	6^{4}
2	(United States) Stephanie Rehe	7	7^{7}

=== Top half ===
==== Section 1 ====
First round
(Netherlands) M van der Torre	4	6	4
(United States) T Mochizuki	6	2	6
(Norway) A Jönsson Raaholt	6	4	7
(Sweden) M Lindström	3	6	6
(Poland) R Baranski	3	5
(Peru) P Vásquez	6	7
12	(United States) V Nelson-Dunbar	6	6
(Puerto Rico) E Viqueira	3	1
(United States) Barg	7	6
(Netherlands) M Mesker	6	1
(United States) M Julia	3	1
(United States) Ca MacGregor	6	6

Second round
1	(Australia) W Turnbull	6	6
(United States) T Mochizuki	2	2
(Norway) A Jönsson Raaholt	2	3
(Peru) P Vásquez	6	6
12	(United States) V Nelson-Dunbar	6	1
(United States) Barg	7	6
(United States) Ca MacGregor	6	2	2
5	(United States) T Phelps	3	6	0^{r}

Third round
1	(Australia) W Turnbull	4	4
(Peru) P Vásquez	6	6
(United States) Barg	6	7
(United States) Ca MacGregor	0	6

Quarterfinals
(Peru) P Vásquez	5	6	6
(United States) Barg	7	0	2

==== Section 2 ====
First round
(United States) M Brown	6	6
(United States) E Galphin	0	1
(United States) S Sloane	6	6
(South Africa) J Mundel	3	0
(United States) C Reynolds	4	6	2
9	(United States) C Benjamin	6	4	6
14	(United States) B Herr	6	6
(United States) S Collins	1	3
(United States) R Reis	6	3	6
(Czechoslovakia) A Holíková	4	6	2
(United States) J Golder	4	6	2
(United States) J Klitch	6	3	6

Second round
3	(United States) G Fernández	6	6
(United States) M Brown	1	2
(United States) S Sloane	2	6
9	(United States) C Benjamin	6	7
14	(United States) B Herr	3	5
(United States) R Reis	6	7
(United States) J Klitch	7	2	7
8	(United States) M Torres	5	6	6

Third round
3	(United States) G Fernández	7	3	0
9	(United States) C Benjamin	5	6	6
(United States) R Reis	6	6
(United States) J Klitch	0	2

Quarterfinals
9	(United States) C Benjamin	4	6	6
(United States) R Reis	6	2	3

=== Bottom half ===
==== Section 3 ====
First round
(South Africa) L Gregory	2	6	6
(France) MC Damas	6	4	1
(Puerto Rico) Marianne Colon	1	1
(South Africa) K Labuschagne	6	6
(United States) S Mascarin	3	4
11	(Australia) E Minter	6	6
(Australia) M Jaggard	7	4	6
(Spain) MJ Llorca	5	6	2
(United States) K Steinmetz	6	2	6
(United States) A Schwartz	3	6	7
(United States) N Sodupe	6	6
(United Kingdom) L Pennington	0	0

Second round
7	(United States) M Gurney	6	6
(South Africa) L Gregory	1	3
(South Africa) K Labuschagne	1	r
11	(Australia) E Minter	6
(Australia) M Jaggard	4	6
(United States) A Schwartz	6	7
(United States) N Sodupe	7	6
4	(Australia) A Minter	5	4

Third round
7	(United States) M Gurney	4	2
11	(Australia) E Minter	6	6
(United States) A Schwartz	5	5
(United States) N Sodupe	7	7

Quarterfinals
11	(Australia) E Minter	6	7
(United States) N Sodupe	3	6

==== Section 4 ====
First round
(United States) Cy MacGregor	6	6
(Bolivia) Elba Piñero	0	0
(United States) D Hansel	6	1	3
(Netherlands) M Bollegraf	3	6	6
(United States) AM Fernandez	7	2	7
13	(Australia) L Field	6	6	5
10	(United States) K Keil	6	6
(Argentina) E Raponi Longo	0	4
(United States) P Smith	3	2
(Netherlands) B Schultz	6	6
(United Kingdom) M Javer	4	7	4
(Australia) J Byrne	6	5	6

Second round
6	(United States) E Hakami	2	6	7
(United States) Cy MacGregor	6	2	5
(Netherlands) M Bollegraf	6	7
(United States) AM Fernandez	1	5
10	(United States) K Keil	7	2	7
(Netherlands) B Schultz	5	6	6
(Australia) J Byrne	4	2
2	(United States) S Rehe	6	6

Third round
6	(United States) E Hakami	6	6
(Netherlands) M Bollegraf	1	3
10	(United States) K Keil	5	6
2	(United States) S Rehe	7	7

Quarterfinals
6	(United States) E Hakami	3	4
2	(United States) S Rehe	6	6
