= 1988 US Open – Women's doubles =

Women's doubles
- 1988 US Open

Final
- Champions: (United States) Gigi Fernández (United States) Robin White
- Runners-up: (United States) Patty Fendick (Canada) Jill Hetherington
- Score: 6–4, 6–1

Details
- Draw: 64
- Seeds: 16

Events
Singles	men	women		boys	girls
Doubles	men	women	mixed	boys	girls
WC Singles	men	women	quad
WC Doubles	men	women	quad
Legends	men	women	mixed
← 1987 ·	US Open	· 1989 →

Martina Navratilova and Pam Shriver were the defending champions but lost in the semifinals to Gigi Fernández and Robin White.

Fernández and White won in the final 6–4, 6–1 against Patty Fendick and Jill Hetherington.

== Seeds ==
Champion seeds are indicated in bold text while text in italics indicates the round in which those seeds were eliminated.

1. (United States) Martina Navratilova / (United States) Pam Shriver (semifinals)
2. (West Germany) Steffi Graf / (Argentina) Gabriela Sabatini (semifinals)
3. (West Germany) Claudia Kohde-Kilsch / (Czechoslovakia) Helena Suková (third round)
4. (United States) Lori McNeil / (United States) Betsy Nagelsen (quarterfinals)
5. (Soviet Union) Larisa Savchenko / (Soviet Union) Natasha Zvereva (second round)
6. (West Germany) Eva Pfaff / (Australia) Elizabeth Smylie (first round)
7. (Czechoslovakia) Jana Novotná / (France) Catherine Suire (third round)
8. (United States) **Gigi Fernández** / (United States) **Robin White (champions)**
9. (United States) Katrina Adams / (United States) Zina Garrison (second round)
10. (United States) Chris Evert / (Australia) Wendy Turnbull (quarterfinals)
11. (United States) Penny Barg / (United States) Elise Burgin (third round)
12. (United States) Patty Fendick / (Canada) Jill Hetherington (final)
13. (Sweden) Catarina Lindqvist / (Denmark) Tine Scheuer-Larsen (third round)
14. (Soviet Union) Natalia Bykova / (Soviet Union) Leila Meskhi (first round)
15. (France) Isabelle Demongeot / (France) Nathalie Tauziat (first round)
16. (United Kingdom) Jo Durie / (United States) Sharon Walsh-Pete (second round)

== Draw ==
=== Key ===
- Q = Qualifier
- WC = Wild card
- LL = Lucky loser
- Alt = Alternate
- SE = Special exempt
- PR = Protected ranking
- ITF = ITF entry
- JE = Junior exempt
- w/o = Walkover
- r = Retired
- d = Defaulted
- SR = Special ranking

=== Finals ===
Semifinals
1	(United States) Martina Navratilova (United States) Pam Shriver	6	3	3
8	(United States) Gigi Fernández (United States) Robin White	4	6	6
12	(United States) Patty Fendick (Canada) Jill Hetherington	6	7^{7}
2	(West Germany) Steffi Graf (Argentina) Gabriela Sabatini	4	6^{1}

Final
8	(United States) Gigi Fernández (United States) Robin White	6	6
12	(United States) Patty Fendick (Canada) Jill Hetherington	4	1

=== Top half ===
==== Section 1 ====
First round
1	(United States) M Navratilova (United States) P Shriver	6	6
(Australia) A Minter (United States) M Van Nostrand	2	2
(United States) M McGrath (United States) K Po	6^{4}	7^{7}	4
(New Zealand) B Cordwell (New Zealand) J Richardson	7^{7}	6^{3}	6
(Australia) L Field (United Kingdom) J Salmon	4	6	7
(Netherlands) C Bakkum (Netherlands) B Schultz	6	4	5
(South Africa) L Barnard (South Africa) K Schimper	4	3
16	(United Kingdom) J Durie (United States) S Walsh-Pete	6	6
13	(Sweden) C Lindqvist (Denmark) T Scheuer-Larsen	6	6
(Argentina) B Fulco (United States) E Raponi-Longo	2	1
(United States) C Benjamin (United States) H Na	6^{4}	4
(Spain) A Sánchez (France) C Tanvier	7^{7}	6
(United States) G Magers (United States) W White	4	6	6^{6}
(Australia) J Byrne (Australia) J Tremelling	6	4	7^{8}
(United States) P Louie-Harper (United States) H Ludloff	1	2
5	(Soviet Union) L Savchenko (Soviet Union) N Zvereva	6	6

Second round
1	(United States) M Navratilova (United States) P Shriver	6	6
(New Zealand) B Cordwell (New Zealand) J Richardson	3	0
(Australia) L Field (United Kingdom) J Salmon	6	7
16	(United Kingdom) J Durie (United States) S Walsh-Pete	3	5
13	(Sweden) C Lindqvist (Denmark) T Scheuer-Larsen	6	3	7
(Spain) A Sánchez (France) C Tanvier	1	6	5
(Australia) J Byrne (Australia) J Tremelling	6	3	6
5	(Soviet Union) L Savchenko (Soviet Union) N Zvereva	1	6	3

Third round
1	(United States) M Navratilova (United States) P Shriver	6	6
(Australia) L Field (United Kingdom) J Salmon	3	4
13	(Sweden) C Lindqvist (Denmark) T Scheuer-Larsen	6	4	3
(Australia) J Byrne (Australia) J Tremelling	3	6	6

Quarterfinals
1	(United States) M Navratilova (United States) P Shriver	6	6
(Australia) J Byrne (Australia) J Tremelling	1	2

==== Section 2 ====
First round
4	(United States) L McNeil (United States) B Nagelsen	6	6
(West Germany) W Probst (South Africa) M Reinach	1	1
(Brazil) L Corsato (West Germany) I Cueto	2	3
(Italy) S Cecchini (Socialist Federal Republic of Yugoslavia) S Goleš	6	6
(Canada) C Bassett-Seguso (United States) B Herr	6	6
(United States) C Cunningham (United States) A Farley	2	3
(France) A Dechaume (France) E Derly	3	2
11	(United States) P Barg (United States) E Burgin	6	6
9	(United States) K Adams (United States) Z Garrison	7	6^{6}	6
(Netherlands) M Bollegraf (Hong Kong) P Hy	5	7^{8}	1
(United States) Ca MacGregor (United States) Cy MacGregor	6	7
(United States) A Frazier (United States) L Spadea	3	5
(Sweden) A-K Olsson (Australia) A Scott	5	3
(Belgium) A Devries (Netherlands) N Jagerman	7	6
(Australia) N Provis (South Africa) E Reinach	4	3
8	(United States) G Fernández (United States) R White	6	6

Second round
4	(United States) L McNeil (United States) B Nagelsen	7	6
(Italy) S Cecchini (Socialist Federal Republic of Yugoslavia) S Goleš	5	4
(Canada) C Bassett-Seguso (United States) B Herr	4	3
11	(United States) P Barg (United States) E Burgin	6	6
9	(United States) K Adams (United States) Z Garrison	5	6^{7}
(United States) Ca MacGregor (United States) Cy MacGregor	7	7^{9}
(Belgium) A Devries (Netherlands) N Jagerman	4	1
8	(United States) G Fernández (United States) R White	6	6

Third round
4	(United States) L McNeil (United States) B Nagelsen	6	7
11	(United States) P Barg (United States) E Burgin	3	5
(United States) Ca MacGregor (United States) Cy MacGregor	1	6^{3}
8	(United States) G Fernández (United States) R White	6	7^{7}

Quarterfinals
4	(United States) L McNeil (United States) B Nagelsen	3	1
8	(United States) G Fernández (United States) R White	6	6

=== Bottom half ===
==== Section 3 ====
First round
7	(Czechoslovakia) J Novotná (France) C Suire	6	6
(Argentina) G Mosca (Argentina) A Villagrán	1	4
(Bulgaria) K Maleeva (Argentina) M Paz	3	6^{3}
(West Germany) C Porwik (South Africa) D van Rensburg	6	7^{7}
(United States) L Allen (United States) A M Fernandez	6	5	7^{7}
(United States) A Cooper (United States) S Sampras	3	7	6^{3}
(Bulgaria) M Maleeva-Fragnière (United States) B Potter	1	2
12	(United States) P Fendick (Canada) J Hetherington	6	6
10	(United States) C Evert (Australia) W Turnbull	6	6
(United States) C Jones (United States) J Kaplan	4	1
(United States) P Casale (United States) M L Daniels	6	3	6^{3}
(Italy) L Ferrando (Italy) L Garrone	3	6	7^{7}
(South Africa) L Gregory (United States) R Reis	6	6
(United States) E Hakami (Brazil) T Zambrzycki	4	2
(United States) L Bartlett (Canada) H Kelesi	3	3
3	(West Germany) C Kohde-Kilsch (Czechoslovakia) H Suková	6	6

Second round
7	(Czechoslovakia) J Novotná (France) C Suire	6	4	6
(West Germany) C Porwik (South Africa) D van Rensburg	4	6	4
(United States) L Allen (United States) A M Fernandez	5	5
12	(United States) P Fendick (Canada) J Hetherington	7	7
10	(United States) C Evert (Australia) W Turnbull	6	6
(Italy) L Ferrando (Italy) L Garrone	2	2
(South Africa) L Gregory (United States) R Reis	4	2
3	(West Germany) C Kohde-Kilsch (Czechoslovakia) H Suková	6	6

Third round
7	(Czechoslovakia) J Novotná (France) C Suire	5	3
12	(United States) P Fendick (Canada) J Hetherington	7	6
10	(United States) C Evert (Australia) W Turnbull	7^{7}	6
3	(West Germany) C Kohde-Kilsch (Czechoslovakia) H Suková	6^{4}	4

Quarterfinals
12	(United States) P Fendick (Canada) J Hetherington	6	6
10	(United States) C Evert (Australia) W Turnbull	1	4

==== Section 4 ====
First round
6	(West Germany) E Pfaff (Australia) E Smylie	6	3	1
(South Africa) R Fairbank (United States) S Rehe	4	6	6
(United States) B Bowes (United States) M Werdel	6	3	6
(United States) C Reynolds (United States) P Smith	1	6	4
(United States) T Phelps (Italy) R Reggi	6	6
(Brazil) P Medrado (Japan) N Sato	1	3
(Czechoslovakia) I Budařová (Belgium) S Wasserman	6	4	6
14	(Soviet Union) N Bykova (Soviet Union) L Meskhi	4	6	2
15	(France) I Demongeot (France) N Tauziat	3	4
(United States) A Henricksson (United States) A Smith	6	6
(United States) T Austin (United States) M J Fernández	7^{7}	6
(France) N Herreman (Sweden) M Lindström	6^{4}	3
(United States) L Antonoplis (United States) S Collins	5	6	0
(Brazil) N Dias (Austria) J Wiesner	7	3	6
(Netherlands) I Driehuis (Netherlands) M Mesker	2	2	r
2	(West Germany) S Graf (Argentina) G Sabatini	6	4

Second round
(South Africa) R Fairbank (United States) S Rehe	6	6
(United States) B Bowes (United States) M Werdel	2	3
(United States) T Phelps (Italy) R Reggi	6	6
(Czechoslovakia) I Budařová (Belgium) S Wasserman	1	1
(United States) A Henricksson (United States) A Smith	6	2	7
(United States) T Austin (United States) M J Fernández	2	6	5
(Brazil) N Dias (Austria) J Wiesner	2	0
2	(West Germany) S Graf (Argentina) G Sabatini	6	6

Third round
(South Africa) R Fairbank (United States) S Rehe	4	3
(United States) T Phelps (Italy) R Reggi	6	6
(United States) A Henricksson (United States) A Smith	4	2
2	(West Germany) S Graf (Argentina) G Sabatini	6	6

Quarterfinals
(United States) T Phelps (Italy) R Reggi	1	3
2	(West Germany) S Graf (Argentina) G Sabatini	6	6
