= 1987 Honda Classic – Doubles =

Doubles
- 1987 Honda Classic

Final
- Champions: (South Africa) Lise Gregory (United States) Ronni Reis
- Runners-up: (United States) Cammy MacGregor (United States) Cynthia MacGregor
- Score: 7–5, 7–5

Details
- Draw: 24
- Seeds: 8

Events
Singles	Doubles
- Puerto Rico Open

Lori McNeil and Mercedes Paz were the defending champions, but none competed this year. McNeil chose to compete at Filderstadt during the same week, finishing as runner-up alongside Zina Garrison.

Lise Gregory and Ronni Reis won the title by defeating Cammy MacGregor and Cynthia MacGregor 7–5, 7–5 in the final.

== Seeds ==
All seeds received a bye to the second round.

1. (United States) Candy Reynolds / (Australia) Wendy Turnbull (quarterfinals)
2. (United States) Penny Barg / (United States) Beth Herr (quarterfinals)
3. (United States) Sandy Collins / (Netherlands) Marcella Mesker (quarterfinals)
4. (United States) Terry Phelps / (United States) Stephanie Rehe (second round, withdrew)
5. (United States) Anna-Maria Fernandez / (Australia) Anne Minter (second round)
6. (United States) Cammy MacGregor / (United States) Cynthia MacGregor (final)
7. (Australia) Jenny Byrne / (Australia) Michelle Jaggard (semifinals)
8. (Netherlands) Manon Bollegraf / (Netherlands) Marianne van der Torre (semifinals)

== Draw ==
Key

- Q = Qualifier
- WC = Wild card
- LL = Lucky loser
- Alt = Alternate
- ITF = ITF entry
- PR = Protected ranking
- SR = Special ranking
- SE = Special exempt
- JE = Junior exempt
- JR = Junior Accelerator Programme entrant
- CO = College Accelerator Programme entrant
- NG = Next Gen Accelerator Program entrant
- w/o = Walkover
- r = Retired
- d = Defaulted

=== Finals ===
Semifinals
8	(Netherlands) Manon Bollegraf (Netherlands) Marianne van der Torre	0	3
(South Africa) Lise Gregory (United States) Ronni Reis	6	6
7	(Australia) Jenny Byrne (Australia) Michelle Jaggard	1	5
6	(United States) Cammy MacGregor (United States) Cynthia MacGregor	6	7

Final
(South Africa) Lise Gregory (United States) Ronni Reis	7	7
6	(United States) Cammy MacGregor (United States) Cynthia MacGregor	5	5

=== Top half ===
First round
(United States) E Hakami (United States) S Sloane	4	6	6
(United States) S Mascarin (South Africa) J Mundel	6	3	2
(United States) J Golder (United States) K Steinmetz	7	4	6
unknown unknown	5	6	0
(United States) E Galphin (South Africa) K Labuschagne
(Australia) L Field (Australia) E Minter	w/o
(Poland) R Baranski (Czechoslovakia) A Holíková	4	2
(South Africa) L Gregory (United States) R Reis	6	6

Second round
1	(United States) C Reynolds (Australia) W Turnbull	6	6
(United States) E Hakami (United States) S Sloane	1	2
(United States) J Golder (United States) K Steinmetz	4	5
8	(Netherlands) M Bollegraf (Netherlands) M van der Torre	6	7
3	(United States) S Collins (Netherlands) M Mesker	7	6
(Australia) L Field (Australia) E Minter	6	3
(South Africa) L Gregory (United States) R Reis	7	6
5	(United States) AM Fernandez (Australia) A Minter	5	4

Quarterfinals
1	(United States) C Reynolds (Australia) W Turnbull	3	4
8	(Netherlands) M Bollegraf (Netherlands) M van der Torre	6	6
3	(United States) S Collins (Netherlands) M Mesker	7	5	5
(South Africa) L Gregory (United States) R Reis	5	7	7

Semifinals
8	(Netherlands) M Bollegraf (Netherlands) M van der Torre	0	3
(South Africa) L Gregory (United States) R Reis	6	6

=== Bottom half ===
First round
(United States) D Hansel (Sweden) M Lindström	6	6
(United States) T Mochizuki (United Kingdom) L Pennington	3	4
(United States) K Keil (United States) P Smith	6	6
(Spain) MJ Llorca (Netherlands) B Schultz	4	3
(United States) V Nelson-Dunbar (Peru) P Vásquez	6	6
(United States) M Julia (Puerto Rico) E Viqueira	1	2
(United States) N Sodupe (United States) M Torres	7	3	4
(United States) C Benjamin (United States) A Schwartz	5	6	6

Second round
7	(Australia) J Byrne (Australia) M Jaggard	6	6
(United States) D Hansel (Sweden) M Lindström	3	4
(United States) K Keil (United States) P Smith	w/o
4	(United States) T Phelps (United States) S Rehe
6	(United States) Ca MacGregor (United States) Cy MacGregor	6	6
(United States) V Nelson-Dunbar (Peru) P Vásquez	3	2
(United States) C Benjamin (United States) A Schwartz	2	5
2	(United States) P Barg (United States) B Herr	6	7

Quarterfinals
7	(Australia) J Byrne (Australia) M Jaggard	1
(United States) K Keil (United States) P Smith	0^{r}
6	(United States) Ca MacGregor (United States) Cy MacGregor	6	6
2	(United States) P Barg (United States) B Herr	1	0

Semifinals
7	(Australia) J Byrne (Australia) M Jaggard	1	5
6	(United States) Ca MacGregor (United States) Cy MacGregor	6	7
