= 1987 Honda Classic =

- Date: October 12–18
- Edition: 2nd
- Category: Category 1+
- Draw: 56S / 24D
- Prize money: $75,000
- Surface: Hard / outdoor
- Location: San Juan, Puerto Rico
- Venue: San Juan Central Park

Champions

Singles
- (United States) Stephanie Rehe

Doubles
- (South Africa) Lise Gregory / (United States) Ronni Reis
- Puerto Rico Open

The 1987 Honda Classic was a women's tennis tournament played on outdoor hard courts at the San Juan Central Park in San Juan in Puerto Rico and was part of the Category 1+ tier of the 1987 WTA Tour. It was the second edition of the tournament and was held from October 12 through October 18, 1987. Second-seeded Stephanie Rehe won the singles title.

== Finals ==
=== Singles ===
(United States) Stephanie Rehe defeated (United States) Camille Benjamin 7–5, 7–6^{(7–4)}

- It was Rehe's only singles title of the year and the 3rd of her career.

=== Doubles ===
(South Africa) Lise Gregory / (United States) Ronni Reis defeated (United States) Cammy MacGregor / (United States) Cynthia MacGregor 7–5, 7–5

- It was Gregory's only doubles title of the year and the 1st of her career. It was Reis' only doubles title of the year and the 1st of her career.
