= 1990 Australian Open – Women's doubles =

Women's doubles
- 1990 Australian Open

Final
- Champion: (Czechoslovakia) Jana Novotná (Czechoslovakia) Helena Suková
- Runner-up: (United States) Patty Fendick (United States) Mary Joe Fernández
- Score: 7–6^{(7–5)}, 7–6^{(8–6)}

Details
- Draw: 64
- Seeds: 16

Events
Singles	men	women		boys	girls
Doubles	men	women	mixed	boys	girls
WC Singles	men	women	quad
WC Doubles	men	women	quad
Legends	men	women	mixed
- Australian Open

Jana Novotná and Helena Suková defeated Patty Fendick and Mary Joe Fernández in the final, 7–6^{(7–5)}, 7–6^{(8–6)} to win the women's doubles tennis title at the 1990 Australian Open.

Martina Navratilova and Pam Shriver were the seven-time reigning champions, but Navratilova did not participate this year. Shriver partnered Hana Mandlíková, but lost in the first round.

== Draw ==
Key

- Q = Qualifier
- WC = Wild card
- LL = Lucky loser
- Alt = Alternate
- ITF = ITF entry
- PR = Protected ranking
- SR = Special ranking
- SE = Special exempt
- JE = Junior exempt
- JR = Junior Accelerator Programme entrant
- CO = College Accelerator Programme entrant
- NG = Next Gen Accelerator Program entrant
- w/o = Walkover
- r = Retired
- d = Defaulted

=== Finals ===
Quarterfinals
1	(Czechoslovakia) Jana Novotná (Czechoslovakia) Helena Suková	7	6
11	(United States) Cammy MacGregor (United States) Cynthia MacGregor	5	2
4	(United States) Gigi Fernández (United States) Robin White	6	6
14	(Soviet Union) Natalia Medvedeva (Soviet Union) Leila Meskhi	3	1
13	(Netherlands) Brenda Schultz (Hungary) Andrea Temesvári	6	6
(Australia) Jo-Anne Faull (Australia) Rachel McQuillan	4	2
5	(United States) Patty Fendick (United States) Mary Joe Fernández	5	7^{7}	6
2	(Soviet Union) Larisa Neiland (Soviet Union) Natalia Zvereva	7	6^{2}	2

Semifinals
1	(Czechoslovakia) Jana Novotná (Czechoslovakia) Helena Suková	6	4	8
4	(United States) Gigi Fernández (United States) Robin White	1	6	6
13	(Netherlands) Brenda Schultz (Hungary) Andrea Temesvári	3	3
5	(United States) Patty Fendick (United States) Mary Joe Fernández	6	6

Final
1	(Czechoslovakia) Jana Novotná (Czechoslovakia) Helena Suková	7^{7}	7^{8}
5	(United States) Patty Fendick (United States) Mary Joe Fernández	6^{5}	6^{6}

=== Top half ===
==== Section 1 ====
First round
1	(Czechoslovakia) J Novotná (Czechoslovakia) H Suková	6	6
(Netherlands) C Bakkum (South Africa) D Van Rensburg	2	3
WC	(Australia) K Godridge (Australia) K Sharpe	6	6
(Australia) D Balestrat (United States) C Benjamin	4	2
(Japan) K Ito (Japan) M Mizokuchi	4	2
(Australia) A Scott (United States) S Walsh-Pete	6	6
(Australia) A Minter (New Zealand) J Richardson	6	6
16	(West Germany) C Porwik (Italy) R Reggi	2	2
11	(Netherlands) M Bollegraf (United Kingdom) J Durie	4	6	3
(United States) Ca MacGregor (United States) Cy MacGregor	6	3	6
(Denmark) L Vandborg (United Kingdom) C Wood	3	6^{7}
(France) A Dechaume (Switzerland) E Krapl	6	7^{9}
(United States) A Henricksson (Denmark) T Scheuer-Larsen	5	4
(Australia) L Field (South Africa) L Gregory	7	6
(United States) B Bowes (United States) A Grossman	2	6^{3}
6	(United States) K Adams (United States) L McNeil	6	7^{7}

Second round
1	(Czechoslovakia) J Novotná (Czechoslovakia) H Suková	6	6
WC	(Australia) K Godridge (Australia) K Sharpe	4	1
(Australia) A Scott (United States) S Walsh-Pete	6	6^{8}	2
(Australia) A Minter (New Zealand) J Richardson	3	7^{10}	6
(United States) Ca MacGregor (United States) Cy MacGregor	6	6
(France) A Dechaume (Switzerland) E Krapl	4	4
(Australia) L Field (South Africa) L Gregory	4	3
6	(United States) K Adams (United States) L McNeil	6	6

Third round
1	(Czechoslovakia) J Novotná (Czechoslovakia) H Suková	6	6
(Australia) A Minter (New Zealand) J Richardson	3	4
(United States) Ca MacGregor (United States) Cy MacGregor	0	6	6
6	(United States) K Adams (United States) L McNeil	6	4	3

Quarterfinals
1	(Czechoslovakia) J Novotná (Czechoslovakia) H Suková	7	6
(United States) Ca MacGregor (United States) Cy MacGregor	5	2

==== Section 2 ====
First round
4	(United States) G Fernández (United States) R White	6	6
(Sweden) M Ekstrand (United Kingdom) A Simpkin	0	1
(Japan) E Iida (West Germany) E-M Schürhoff	3	6	4
(United States) H Cioffi (United States) A Frazier	6	2	6
(United States) D Faber (United States) M Werdel	6^{3}	1
(Sweden) M Lindström (United States) H Ludloff	7^{7}	6
(Australia) K McDonald (Australia) K Radford	6	7
9	(Canada) J Hetherington (Australia) N Provis	4	5
14	(Soviet Union) N Medvedeva (Soviet Union) L Meskhi	6	7
(Belgium) A Devries (Belgium) S Wasserman	0	5
(France) N Herreman (France) C Suire	2	3
(France) J Halard (United States) A Leand	6	6
(United States) A Keller (Brazil) T Zambrzycki	3	2
(United States) A Grousbeck (Japan) N Miyagi	6	6
(Switzerland) C Cohen (Australia) L O'Neill	0	2
8	(Australia) J Tremelling (Australia) W Turnbull	6	6

Second round
4	(United States) G Fernández (United States) R White	6	6
(United States) H Cioffi (United States) A Frazier	0	2
(Sweden) M Lindström (United States) H Ludloff	6	3	6
14	(Australia) K McDonald (Australia) K Radford	1	6	4
14	(Soviet Union) N Medvedeva (Soviet Union) L Meskhi	6	6
(France) J Halard (United States) A Leand	1	3
(United States) A Grousbeck (Japan) N Miyagi	2	3
8	(Australia) J Tremelling (Australia) W Turnbull	6	6

Third round
4	(United States) G Fernández (United States) R White	6	6
(Sweden) M Lindström (United States) H Ludloff	2	1
14	(Soviet Union) N Medvedeva (Soviet Union) L Meskhi	4	6	7
8	(Australia) J Tremelling (Australia) W Turnbull	6	3	5

Quarterfinals
4	(United States) G Fernández (United States) R White	6	6
14	(Soviet Union) N Medvedeva (Soviet Union) L Meskhi	3	1

=== Bottom half ===
==== Section 3 ====
First round
7	(West Germany) S Graf (Argentina) G Sabatini	6	6
(Italy) L Golarsa (Austria) J Wiesner	2	4
(United States) Z Garrison-Jackson (United States) K Rinaldi	6^{4}	4
(Socialist Federal Republic of Yugoslavia) S Goleš (Bulgaria) K Maleeva	7^{7}	6
(Japan) E Okagawa (Japan) N Sato	4	4
(Austria) B Paulus (Czechoslovakia) R Zrubáková	6	6
WC	(Australia) N Pratt (Australia) A Woolcock	3	2
13	(Netherlands) B Schultz (Hungary) A Temesvári	6	6
12	(United States) K Jordan (Australia) E Smylie	6	6
(Japan) K Date (Japan) M Kidowaki	3	1
(West Germany) S Meier (Bulgaria) E Pampoulova	6^{1}	6^{7}
(Luxembourg) K Kschwendt (New Zealand) C Toleafoa	7^{7}	7^{9}
(United States) R Reis (United States) S Stafford	6	3	5
WC	(Australia) M Bowrey (Australia) J Hodder	0	6	7
(Australia) J-O Faull (Australia) R McQuillan	6	6^{2}	6
3	(Australia) H Mandlíková (United States) P Shriver	2	7^{7}	4

Second round
7	(West Germany) S Graf (Argentina) G Sabatini
(Socialist Federal Republic of Yugoslavia) S Goleš (Bulgaria) K Maleeva	w/o
(Austria) B Paulus (Czechoslovakia) R Zrubáková	6^{3}	4
13	(Netherlands) B Schultz (Hungary) A Temesvári	7^{7}	6
12	(United States) K Jordan (Australia) E Smylie	6	6
(Luxembourg) K Kschwendt (New Zealand) C Toleafoa	1	0
WC	(Australia) M Bowrey (Australia) J Hodder	7	5	2
(Australia) J-O Faull (Australia) R McQuillan	7	7	6

Third round
(Socialist Federal Republic of Yugoslavia) S Goleš (Bulgaria) K Maleeva	5	3
13	(Netherlands) B Schultz (Hungary) A Temesvári	7	6
12	(United States) K Jordan (Australia) E Smylie	7	4	4
(Australia) J-O Faull (Australia) R McQuillan	5	6	6

Quarterfinals
(Netherlands) B Schultz (Hungary) A Temesvári	6	6
(Australia) J-O Faull (Australia) R McQuillan	4	2

==== Section 4 ====
First round
5	(United States) P Fendick (United States) MJ Fernández	6	6
(Netherlands) N Jagerman (Netherlands) C Vis	2	4
(West Germany) E Pfaff (Australia) R Stubbs	7	6
(Czechoslovakia) J Pospíšilová (Czechoslovakia) R Rajchrtová	5	1
(Sweden) C Dahlman (West Germany) W Probst	1	3
(United States) L Allen (Australia) M Jaggard	6	6
(West Germany) S Frankl (New Zealand) R Seeman	0	2
15	(France) I Demongeot (France) C Tanvier	6	6
10	(United States) E Burgin (South Africa) R Fairbank	6	6
WC	(Australia) L Stacey (Australia) J Taylor	1	3
(West Germany) M Pawlik (Austria) H Sprung	6	3	6
(Japan) T Takagi (Finland) P Thorén	2	6	1
Alt	(Australia) D Jones (Australia) S McNamara	5	6^{5}
(United States) S Collins (United States) J Smoller	7	7^{7}
(Czechoslovakia) P Langrová (Czechoslovakia) E Švíglerová	2	3
2	(Soviet Union) L Neiland (Soviet Union) N Zvereva	6	6

Second round
5	(United States) P Fendick (United States) MJ Fernández	6	6
(West Germany) E Pfaff (Australia) R Stubbs	3	3
(United States) L Allen (Australia) M Jaggard	4	3
15	(France) I Demongeot (France) C Tanvier	6	6
10	(United States) E Burgin (South Africa) R Fairbank	6	6
(West Germany) M Pawlik (Austria) H Sprung	2	3
(United States) S Collins (United States) J Smoller	1	3
2	(Soviet Union) L Neiland (Soviet Union) N Zvereva	6	6

Third round
5	(United States) P Fendick (United States) MJ Fernández	2	7	6
15	(France) I Demongeot (France) C Tanvier	6	5	3
10	(United States) E Burgin (South Africa) R Fairbank	2	6^{3}
2	(Soviet Union) L Neiland (Soviet Union) N Zvereva	6	7^{7}

Quarterfinals
5	(United States) P Fendick (United States) MJ Fernández	5	7^{7}	6
2	(Soviet Union) L Neiland (Soviet Union) N Zvereva	7	6^{2}	2
