= Patty Fendick =

American tennis player

- Country (sports): United States
- Born: March 31, 1965 (age 61) Sacramento, California, U.S.
- Height: 5 ft 4 in (1.63 m)
- Turned pro: 1982
- Retired: 1995
- Plays: Right-handed
- College: Stanford University
- Prize money: $1,574,956

Singles
- Career record: 249–183
- Career titles: 3
- Highest ranking: No. 19 (March 27, 1989)

Grand Slam singles results
- Australian Open: QF (1990)
- French Open: 2R (1991, 1995)
- Wimbledon: 4R (1989, 1990, 1992)
- US Open: 4R (1988)

Doubles
- Career record: 347–153
- Career titles: 25
- Highest ranking: No. 4 (July 3, 1989)

Grand Slam doubles results
- Australian Open: W (1991)
- French Open: SF (1995)
- Wimbledon: SF (1986, 1990)
- US Open: F (1988)

Team competitions
- Fed Cup: 2–1

Patty Fendick (born March 31, 1965) is an American former professional tennis player and the former women's tennis program head coach at University of Texas and head coach at University of Washington.

Born in Sacramento, California, she played at the collegiate level at Stanford University, where the team won the NCAA team title three times. In 1987, she was named ITA Player of the Year, when on the Stanford tennis team she had a 57-match winning streak. She won two NCAA singles titles in 1986 and 1987. She won the Broderick Award (now the Honda Sports Award) as the nation's top collegiate tennis player in 1987. Her playing accomplishments, as a collegiate and professional player, has elevated her being inducted into the Stanford Hall of Fame and also recognized as the Most Outstanding Student-Athlete of the first 25 years of NCAA women's tennis.

Fendick remains active in the sport of tennis as a coach and by serving on numerous committees with ITA and USTA. She was previously a tennis coach with the Washington Huskies.

== Grand Slam finals ==
=== Doubles: 5 (1 title, 4 runner-ups) ===
Result	Year	Championship	Surface	Partner	Opponents	Score
Loss	1988	US Open	Hard	(Canada) Jill Hetherington	(United States) Gigi Fernández (United States) Robin White	4–6, 1–6
Loss	1989	Australian Open	Hard	(Canada) Jill Hetherington	(United States) Martina Navratilova (United States) Pam Shriver	6–3, 3–6, 2–6
Loss	1990	Australian Open	Hard	(United States) Mary Joe Fernández	(Czechoslovakia) Jana Novotná (Czechoslovakia) Helena Suková	6–7^{(5–7)}, 6–7^{(6–8)}
Win	1991	Australian Open	Hard	(United States) Mary Joe Fernández	(United States) Gigi Fernández (Czechoslovakia) Jana Novotná	7–6^{(7–4)}, 6–1
Loss	1994	Australian Open	Hard	(United States) Meredith McGrath	(United States) Gigi Fernández (Belarus) Natalia Zvereva	3–6, 6–4, 4–6

== WTA career finals ==
=== Doubles: 40 (24–16) ===
Result	W/L	Date	Tournament	Surface	Partner	Opponents	Score
Win	1–0	Jan 1988	Auckland, New Zealand	Hard	(Canada) Jill Hetherington	(United States) Cammy MacGregor (United States) Cynthia MacGregor	6–2, 6–1
Win	2–0	Feb 1988	Wellington, New Zealand	Hard	(Canada) Jill Hetherington	(New Zealand) Belinda Cordwell (New Zealand) Julie Richardson	6–3, 6–3
Win	3–0	Apr 1988	Taipei, Taiwan	Carpet (i)	(United States) Ann Henricksson	(New Zealand) Belinda Cordwell (New Zealand) Julie Richardson	6–2, 2–6, 6–2
Loss	2–1	Jul 1988	Berkeley, U.S.	Hard	(Canada) Jill Hetherington	(United States) Ronni Reis (South Africa) Lise Gregory	3–6, 4–6
Win	3–1	Aug 1988	San Diego, U.S.	Hard	(Canada) Jill Hetherington	(United States) Betsy Nagelsen (South Africa) Dinky Van Rensburg	7–6^{(10)}, 6–4
Win	4–1	Aug 1988	Los Angeles, U.S.	Hard	(Canada) Jill Hetherington	(United States) Gigi Fernández (United States) Robin White	7–6^{(2)}, 5–7, 6–4
Loss	4–2	Aug 1988	US Open	Hard	(Canada) Jill Hetherington	(United States) Gigi Fernández (United States) Robin White	4–6, 1–6
Win	5–2	Oct 1988	Puerto Rico, U.S.	Hard	(Canada) Jill Hetherington	(United States) Gigi Fernández (United States) Robin White	6–4, 6–2
Loss	5–3	Jan 1989	Brisbane, Australia	Hard	(Canada) Jill Hetherington	(Czech Republic) Jana Novotná (Czech Republic) Helena Suková	7–6^{(4)}, 1–6, 2–6
Loss	5–4	Jan 1989	Australian Open	Hard	(Canada) Jill Hetherington	(United States) Martina Navratilova (United States) Pam Shriver	6–3, 3–6, 2–6
Win	6–4	Feb 1989	Auckland, New Zealand	Hard	(Canada) Jill Hetherington	(Australia) Elizabeth Smylie (Australia) Janine Thompson	6–4, 6–4
Win	7–4	Feb 1989	Connecticut, U.S.	Carpet (i)	(Canada) Jill Hetherington	(Soviet Union) Larisa Neiland (Soviet Union) Natasha Zvereva	7–5, 3–6, 6–2
Loss	7–5	Feb 1989	New Haven, U.S.	Hard	(Canada) Jill Hetherington	(United States) Katrina Adams (United States) Pam Shriver	6–3, 1–6, 4–6
Loss	7–6	Jan 1990	Australian Open	Hard	(United States) Mary Joe Fernández	(Czechoslovakia) Jana Novotná (Czechoslovakia) Helena Suková	6–7^{(5)}, 6–7^{(3)}
Loss	7–7	Jun 1990	Eastbourne, UK	Grass	(United States) Zina Garrison	(Soviet Union) Larisa Savchenko-Neiland (Soviet Union) Natalia Zvereva	4–6, 3–6
Win	8–7	Aug 1990	San Diego, U.S.	Hard	(United States) Zina Garrison	(United States) Elise Burgin (South Africa) Rosalyn Fairbank	6–4, 7–6^{(5)}
Win	9–7	Nov 1990	San Jose, U.S.	Hard	(United States) Meredith McGrath	(United States) Katrina Adams (Canada) Jill Hetherington	6–1, 6–1
Win	10–7	Jan 1991	Australian Open	Hard	(United States) Mary Joe Fernández	(United States) Gigi Fernández (Czechoslovakia) Jana Novotná	7–6^{(4)}, 6–1
Win	11–7	Jan 1991	Auckland, New Zealand	Hard	(Soviet Union) Larisa Neiland	(Australia) Jo-Anne Faull (Australia) Julie Richardson	6–3, 6–3
Win	12–7	Mar 1991	San Jose, U.S.	Hard	(Socialist Federal Republic of Yugoslavia) Monica Seles	(Canada) Jill Hetherington (United States) Kathy Rinaldi	7–6^{(2)}, 6–2
Loss	12–8	Apr 1991	Houston, U.S.	Clay	(United States) Mary Joe Fernández	(Canada) Jill Hetherington (United States) Kathy Rinaldi	1–6, 6–2, 1–6
Win	13–8	Nov 1991	Oakland, U.S.	Carpet	(United States) Gigi Fernández	(United States) Martina Navratilova (United States) Pam Shriver	6–4, 7–5
Win	14–8	Nov 1991	Indianapolis, U.S.	Hard	(United States) Gigi Fernández	(United States) Katrina Adams (Argentina) Mercedes Paz	6–4, 6–2
Loss	14–9	Mar 1992	US Hard Court Championships	Hard	(Czechoslovakia) Andrea Strnadová	(United States) Martina Navratilova (United States) Pam Shriver	6–3, 2–6, 6–7
Win	15–9	Apr 1992	Houston, US	Clay	(United States) Gigi Fernández	(Canada) Jill Hetherington (United States) Kathy Rinaldi	7–5, 6–4
Win	16–9	May 1992	Strasbourg, France	Clay	(Czechoslovakia) Andrea Strnadová	(United States) Lori McNeil (Argentina) Mercedes Paz	6–3, 6–4
Loss	16–10	Oct 1992	Leipzig, Germany	Carpet (i)	(Czechoslovakia) Andrea Strnadová	(Latvia) Larisa Neiland (Czech Republic) Jana Novotná	5–7, 6–7
Win	17–10	Feb 1993	U.S. National Indoors	Hard (i)	(United States) Zina Garrison	(United States) Katrina Adams (Netherlands) Manon Bollegraf	6–3, 6–2
Loss	17–11	Apr 1993	Pattaya, Thailand	Hard	(United States) Meredith McGrath	(United States) Cammy Macgregor (France) Catherine Suire	3–6, 6–7
Win	18–11	Apr 1993	Malaysia Open	Hard	(United States) Meredith McGrath	(United States) Nicole Arendt (Australia) Kristine Radford	6–4, 7–6
Loss	18–12	Oct 1993	Filderstad, Germany	Carpet (i)	(United States) Martina Navratilova	(United States) Gigi Fernández (Belarus) Natasha Zvereva	6–7, 4–6
Win	19–12	Nov 1993	San Jose, U.S.	Carpet (i)	(United States) Meredith McGrath	(South Africa) Amanda Coetzer (Argentina) Inés Gorrochategui	6–2, 6–0
Win	20–12	Jan 1994	Sydney, Australia	Hard	(United States) Meredith McGrath	(Czech Republic) Jana Novotná (Spain) Arantxa Sánchez Vicario	6–2, 6–3
Loss	20–13	Jan 1994	Australian Open	Hard	(United States) Meredith McGrath	(United States) Gigi Fernández (Belarus) Natalia Zvereva	3–6, 6–4, 4–6
Win	21–13	Feb 1994	National Indoors, U.S.	Hard (i)	(United States) Meredith McGrath	(United States) Katrina Adams (Netherlands) Manon Bollegraf	7–6, 6–2
Loss	21–14	Mar 1994	Key Biscayne, U.S.	Hard	(United States) Meredith McGrath	(United States) Gigi Fernández (Belarus) Natalia Zvereva	3–6, 1–6
Win	22–14	Apr 1994	Pattaya Open, Thailand	Hard	(United States) Meredith McGrath	(Indonesia) Yayuk Basuki (Japan) Nana Miyagi	7–6, 3–6, 6–3
Win	23–14	Apr 1994	Singapore	Hard	(United States) Meredith McGrath	(United States) Nicole Arendt (Australia) Kristine Radford	6–4, 6–1
Win	24–14	Oct 1994	Leipzig, Germany	Carpet (i)	(United States) Meredith McGrath	(Netherlands) Manon Bollegraf (Latvia) Larisa Savchenko	6–4, 6–4
Loss	24–15	Oct 1994	Zurich, Switzerland	Carpet (i)	(United States) Meredith McGrath	(Netherlands) Manon Bollegraf (United States) Martina Navratilova	6–7, 1–6
Loss	24–16	Jan 1995	Sydney, Australia	Hard	(United States) Mary Joe Fernández	(United States) Lindsay Davenport (Czech Republic) Jana Novotná	5–7, 6–2, 4–6
