= Kim Labuschagne =

South African-American tennis player (born 1967)

- Full name: Kim Benson (née Labuschagne)
- Country (sports): South Africa; United States
- Born: September 11, 1967 (age 58)
- Plays: Right-handed
- Prize money: $27,788

Singles
- Career record: 68–58
- Career titles: 2 ITF
- Highest ranking: No. 187 (Feb 1, 1988)

Grand Slam singles results
- French Open: Q1 (1988)

Doubles
- Career record: 22–18
- Career titles: 1 ITF
- Highest ranking: No. 167 (Dec 21, 1987)

Kim Benson (née Labuschagne; born September 11, 1967), formerly Kim Barry, is a South African-American former professional tennis player.

Labuschagne, who grew up in Pretoria, played collegiate tennis for Texas A&M in the late 1980s. She was the program's first All-American in 1987, when she reached the singles quarter-finals of the NCAA championships. Her first husband Van Barry was an assistant coach for the team and later her personal coach.

While competing on the professional tour, Labuschagne had a career high singles ranking of 187 in the world. Her best performance in a WTA Tour tournament was a second round appearance at the San Juan Open in 1987. She featured in the qualifying draw for the 1988 French Open.

== ITF finals ==
=== Singles: 4 (2–2) ===
| Outcome | No. | Date | Tournament | Surface | Opponent | Score |
|---|---|---|---|---|---|---|
| Winner | 1. | June 7, 1987 | Boca Raton, United States | Clay | (South Africa) Lise Gregory | 4–6, 6–3, 6–3 |
| Runner-up | 1. | June 17, 1990 | Largo, United States | Clay | (United States) Nicole Arendt | 2–6, 1–6 |
| Runner-up | 2. | July 22, 1990 | Greensboro, United States | Clay | (United States) Caroline Kuhlman | 4–6, 1–6 |
| Winner | 2. | August 12, 1990 | Lebanon, United States | Hard | (Japan) Shiho Okada | 6–0, 6–3 |

=== Doubles: 3 (1–2) ===
| Outcome | No. | Date | Tournament | Surface | Partner | Opponents | Score |
|---|---|---|---|---|---|---|---|
| Runner-up | 1. | June 11, 1989 | Delray Beach, United States | Hard | (United States) Audra Keller | (United States) Kathy Foxworth (United States) Tammy Whittington | 2–6, 3–6 |
| Winner | 1. | June 25, 1989 | Augusta, United States | Clay | (United States) Audra Keller | (United States) Shannan McCarthy (United States) Laxmi Poruri | 6–4, 6–4 |
| Runner-up | 2. | July 23, 1989 | Fayetteville, United States | Hard | (United States) Audra Keller | (United States) Anne-Marie Walson (United States) Tammy Whittington | 6–7, 1–6 |
