= Cynthia MacGregor =

American tennis player

- Full name: Cynthia MacGregor
- Country (sports): United States
- Born: March 26, 1964 Torrance, California
- Died: February 13, 1996 (aged 31) Monterey Park, California
- Prize money: $96,714

Singles
- Career record: 38–50
- Highest ranking: No. 177 (March 14, 1988)

Grand Slam singles results
- Australian Open: 2R (1988)

Doubles
- Career record: 78–80
- Career titles: 1
- Highest ranking: No. 50 (April 11, 1988)

Grand Slam doubles results
- Australian Open: QF (1990)
- French Open: 1R (1990)
- Wimbledon: 2R (1987)
- US Open: 3R (1988)

Cynthia MacGregor (March 26, 1964 – February 13, 1996) was a professional tennis player from the United States.

== Biography ==
MacGregor, who was known as "Cinny", was born in Torrance, California.

From 1983 to 1986, she played collegiate tennis at San Diego State University, where she was a five time All-American.

She competed on the professional tour mostly as a doubles player, reaching 50 in the world. In doubles she often partnered with younger sister Cammy MacGregor and the pair made four WTA Tour finals together, including a title win in Taipei in 1987. Her most notable performance in singles was a second round appearance at the 1988 Australian Open, where after beating Patricia Hy in the first round, she lost in the second round to eventual quarter-finalist Claudia Porwik, 11–13 in the deciding set. At the 1990 Australian Open, she teamed up with her sister to make the quarter-finalists of the women's doubles.

In 1996, she died of complications relating to anorexia nervosa, aged 31.

== WTA Tour finals ==
=== Doubles (1-3) ===
Result	Date	Tournament	Tier	Surface	Partner	Opponents	Score
Win	Apr 1987	Taipei, Taiwan	Category 1	Carpet	(United States) Cammy MacGregor	(United States) Sandy Collins (United States) Sharon Walsh	7–6^{(10–8)}, 5–7, 6–4
Loss	Oct 1987	San Juan, Puerto Rico	Category 1+	Hard	(United States) Cammy MacGregor	(South Africa) Lise Gregory (United States) Ronni Reis	5–7, 5–7
Loss	Jan 1988	Auckland, New Zealand	Category 1	Hard	(United States) Cammy MacGregor	(United States) Patty Fendick (Canada) Jill Hetherington	2–6, 1–6
Loss	Apr 1988	Tampa, Florida, USA	Category 3	Clay	(United States) Cammy MacGregor	(United States) Terry Phelps (Italy) Raffaella Reggi	2–6, 4–6
