= Cammy MacGregor =

American tennis player

- Country (sports): United States
- Born: October 11, 1968 (age 57) Torrance, California, U.S.
- Height: 5 ft 5 1/2 in (1.66 m)
- Turned pro: August 1986
- Plays: Right-handed (two-handed backhand)
- Prize money: $360,722

Singles
- Career record: 44–84
- Career titles: 0
- Highest ranking: No. 75 (October 13, 1986)

Grand Slam singles results
- Australian Open: 4R (1989)
- French Open: 2R (1990)
- Wimbledon: 1R (1987, 1989, 1990, 1993)
- US Open: 2R (1986, 1989)

Doubles
- Career record: 128–143
- Career titles: 3
- Highest ranking: No. 38 (October 26, 1992)

Grand Slam doubles results
- Australian Open: QF (1990)
- French Open: 2R (1989)
- Wimbledon: 2R (1987)
- US Open: 3R (1988)

Cammy MacGregor (born October 11, 1968) is an American former tennis player from the mid-1980s until 1995.

Her elder sister Cynthia was also a tennis player, and they sometimes partnered in doubles.

== WTA Tour finals ==
=== Singles (1 runner-up) ===
Legend
Grand Slam	0
WTA Championships	0
Tier I	0
Tier II	0
Tier III	0
Tier IV & V	0

Result	No.	Date	Tournament	Surface	Opponent	Score
Loss	1.	Apr 1989	Taipei, Taiwan	Hard	(Australia) Anne Minter	1–6, 4–6, 2–6

=== Doubles 10 (3 titles – 7 runners-up) ===
Legend
Grand Slam	0
WTA Championships	0
Tier I	0
Tier II	0
Tier III	0
Tier IV & V	2

Titles by surface
Hard	2
Clay	0
Grass	0
Carpet	1

Result	No.	Date	Tournament	Surface	Partner	Opponents	Score
Loss	1.	Jul 1986	Newport, Rhode Island, U.S.	Grass	(United States) Gretchen Rush	(United States) Terry Holladay (United States) Heather Ludloff	1–6, 7–6, 3–6
Win	2.	Apr 1987	Taipei, Taiwan	Carpet	(United States) Cynthia MacGregor	(United States) Sandy Collins (United States) Sharon Walsh	7–6^{(10–8)}, 5–7, 6–4
Loss	3.	Oct 1987	San Juan, Puerto Rico	Hard	(United States) Cynthia MacGregor	(South Africa) Lise Gregory (United States) Ronni Reis	5–7, 5–7
Loss	4.	Jan 1988	Auckland, New Zealand	Hard	(United States) Cynthia MacGregor	(United States) Patty Fendick (Canada) Jill Hetherington	2–6, 1–6
Loss	5.	Apr 1988	Tampa, Florida, U.S.	Clay	(United States) Cynthia MacGregor	(United States) Terry Phelps (Italy) Raffaella Reggi	2–6, 4–6
Loss	6.	Jul 1988	Schenectady, New York, U.S.	Hard	(United States) Lea Antonoplis	(United States) Ann Henricksson (New Zealand) Julie Richardson	3–6, 6–3, 5–7
Win	7.	Nov 1991	Scottsdale, Arizona, U.S.	Hard	(United States) Mareen Harper	(United States) Sandy Collins (South Africa) Elna Reinach	7–5, 3–6, 6–3
Loss	8.	Oct 1992	Taipei, Taiwan	Hard	(South Africa) Amanda Coetzer	(Australia) Jo-Anne Faull (New Zealand) Julie Richardson	6–3, 3–6, 2–6
Loss	9.	Jan 1993	Melbourne, Australia	Hard	(United States) Shaun Stafford	(Australia) Nicole Provis (France) Nathalie Tauziat	6–1, 3–6, 3–6
Win	10.	Apr 1993	Pattaya, Thailand	Hard	(France) Catherine Suire	(United States) Patty Fendick (United States) Meredith McGrath	6–3, 7–6^{(7–3)}
