= Kathrin Keil =

American tennis player

- Full name: Kathrin Keil Sieberth
- Country (sports): United States
- Born: November 28, 1962 (age 62)
- Prize money: $78,234

Singles
- Highest ranking: No. 68 (October 26, 1987)

Grand Slam singles results
- Australian Open: 2R (1987, 1989)
- French Open: 1R (1984)
- Wimbledon: 1R (1987)
- US Open: 2R (1987)

Doubles
- Highest ranking: No. 209 (October 26, 1987)

Grand Slam doubles results
- French Open: 2R (1984)

Kathrin Keil Sieberth (born November 28, 1962) is a former professional tennis player from the United States. Her surname is pronounced "Kyle".

== Biography ==
Keil grew up in Albuquerque, New Mexico, where she moved to from California at the age of five. Her father, noted scientist Klaus Keil, was a professor of geology at the University of New Mexico. Both of her parents were German immigrants. She has a younger brother, Mark Keil, who also became a professional tennis player. For her junior year of high school she returned to California and lived with a family in Malibu while she trained under Paul Cohen, who later coached John McEnroe.

At the 1980 US Open she was runner-up to Susan Mascarin in the girls' singles and in the same year made the semi-finals of a WTA Tour tournament in Tampa. She appeared in the women's singles at the 1981 US Open and lost in the first round to top seed Chris Evert-Lloyd. Prior to turning professional she attended UCLA and was an All-American on the collegiate tennis team.

From 1982 she competed professionally and in her first international WTA Tour main draw reached the quarter-finals, at the 1982 Casino Cup in West Germany. She retired in 1985 aged 22, due to illness and injuries, but regained her desire to compete late in 1986 and made the semi-finals of São Paulo in her first month back. In 1987 she had her best season on tour, making the semi-finals in Auckland, the round of 16 at the Lipton Championships and appeared in three Grand Slam main draws, to get to a career best 68 in the world. She struggled with a quadriceps injury in 1988. At the 1989 Australian Open she had a win over Kathleen Horvath. She retired at the end of 1989.

She now lives in Baton Rouge, Louisiana.
