= Amy Schwartz (sportsperson) =

American tennis player

- Full name: Amy Schwartz Gross
- Country (sports): United States
- Born: September 2, 1969 (age 56)
- College: University of Miami
- Prize money: $89,482

Singles
- Highest ranking: No. 153 (July 18, 1988)

Grand Slam singles results
- Australian Open: 2R (1988)

Doubles
- Highest ranking: No. 226 (21 May 1990)

Grand Slam doubles results
- Australian Open: 1R (1988)

Amy Schwartz Gross (born September 2, 1969) is an American former professional tennis player and amateur golfer. She played collegiate tennis at the University of Miami in Coral Gables, Florida.

Her husband is PIMCO co-founder and billionaire Bill H. Gross.

== Biography ==
Schwartz, who comes from Miami, was an Easter Bowl champion in tennis as a junior, winning the girls' 16s title in 1984. She played number one singles at the University of Miami. She trained under tennis coach Nick Bollettieri. On the professional tour her best performance was a semi-final appearance at the 1986 Brazilian Open in São Paulo, which included a win over Arantxa Sánchez Vicario. At the 1988 Australian Open, she made the second round of the women's singles in her only main draw singles appearance at a grand slam tournament. She represented the United States at the 1993 Maccabiah Games in Israel.

She is also an amateur golfer, playing at The American Express at PGA West in January 2020 and winning the amateur Overall Net category. Schwartz was featured on the cover of Golf News magazine for an interview where she provided details about her win. In another Golf News interview in the February 2021 issue, she discussed the challenge of mastering golf late in life after her earlier career in tennis.

She met “Bond King” Bill Gross through a mutual friend in 2017, and they now live together part-time in a Laguna Beach oceanfront mansion he bought for her, and which she decorated with a “love” theme. Named “Rockledge by the Sea” by a prior owner, the 10,000-square-foot home was the third most-expensive home sale in 2018 in Orange County, California at $32 million. The residence has 190 feet of ocean frontage, along with a private-access cove and beach. During the winter months, the couple lives in a home in the Vintage Club golf community in Indian Wells, California. She married Gross in April 2021 in a ceremony at their Indian Wells home.
