= Elly Hakami =

American tennis player

- Country (sports): United States
- Born: 25 August 1969 (age 56)
- Prize money: US$ 232,335

Singles
- Career record: 121–123
- Career titles: 1
- Highest ranking: No. 32 (May 9, 1988)

Grand Slam singles results
- Australian Open: 1R (1994, 1995)
- French Open: 1R (1988, 1989)
- Wimbledon: 2R (1988)
- US Open: 3R (1987)

Doubles
- Career record: 91–100
- Career titles: 0
- Highest ranking: No. 68 (November 9, 1987)

Grand Slam doubles results
- Australian Open: 1R (1991, 1994, 1996, 1997)
- French Open: 1R (1988, 1989)
- Wimbledon: 1R (1988, 1989)
- US Open: 3R (1994)

Elly Hakami (born August 25, 1969) is a former professional tennis player from the U.S. She played from the mid-1980s until 1997. Hakami is from Tiburon, California. She was ranked world No. 32 in 1988.

After beating Hakami in 1987, Martina Navratilova said of Hakami: "She's a very good player. She seems to be very bright and she's a lot better all-court player than I thought she would be. I thought she served well and she comes out tough."

== WTA career finals ==
=== Singles: (1 title) ===
Result	W-L	Date	Tournament	Surface	Opponent	Score
Win	1–0	Jul 1987	Aptos, U.S.	Hard	(United States) Melissa Gurney	6–3, 6–4

== Family ==
Hakami was formerly married to Polo Cowen who was a former professional tennis player, and has two children, Sonya and Polo, and lives in Tiburon, California.
