= Lise Gregory =

South African tennis player

- Country (sports): South Africa
- Born: 29 August 1963 (age 62) Durban, South Africa
- Retired: 1993
- Plays: Left-handed
- College: University of Miami
- Prize money: $244,383

Singles
- Career record: 88–76
- Career titles: 1 ITF
- Highest ranking: No. 167 (7 December 1987)

Doubles
- Career record: 182–105
- Career titles: 7 WTA, 7 ITF
- Highest ranking: No. 17 (8 April 1991)

Grand Slam doubles results
- Australian Open: QF (1991)
- French Open: 3R (1989, 1990)
- Wimbledon: 3R (1990)
- US Open: 3R (1989, 1990, 1991)

Lise Gregory (born 29 August 1963) is a South African former tennis player who played primarily doubles. She played left-handed. Her career-high doubles ranking in 1990 was no. 18. She reached the quarterfinals of the Australian Open and was one of the top eight teams participating in the year-end Virginia Slims Championships.

She played in college for the University of Miami, earning seven NCAA All-American awards in both singles and doubles and the NCAA doubles championship in 1986 with long-time doubles partner Ronni Reis.

After her playing career, she became a college coach, first assistant coach at Vanderbilt University, then head coach at Florida State University and the University of North Carolina at Asheville, earning numerous coaching awards.

== WTA Tour finals ==
=== Doubles 13 (7–6) ===
Legend
Grand Slam	0
WTA Championships	0
Tier I	0
Tier II	0
Tier III	2
Tier IV & V	3

Titles by surface
Hard	4
Clay	1
Grass	1
Carpet	1

Result	W/L	Date	Tournament	Surface	Partner	Opponents	Score
Win	1–0	Oct 1987	San Juan, Puerto Rico	Hard	(United States) Ronni Reis	(United States) Cammy MacGregor (United States) Cynthia MacGregor	7–5, 7–5
Win	2–0	Jul 1988	Aptos, California, US	Hard	(United States) Ronni Reis	(United States) Patty Fendick (Canada) Jill Hetherington	6–3, 6–4
Win	3–0	Feb 1989	Wichita, Kansas, US	Clay	(Netherlands) Manon Bollegraf	(United States) Sandy Collins (Soviet Union) Leila Meskhi	6–2, 7–6
Loss	3–1	May 1989	Berlin, Germany	Clay	(United States) Gretchen Magers	(Australia) Liz Smylie (Australia) Janine Tremelling	7–5, 3–6, 2–6
Loss	3–2	May 1989	Strasbourg, France	Clay	(United States) Gretchen Magers	(Argentina) Mercedes Paz (Austria) Judith Wiesner	3–6, 3–6
Loss	3–3	Feb 1990	Oklahoma City, Oklahoma, US	Hard	(Netherlands) Manon Bollegraf	(United States) Mary Lou Daniels (United States) Wendy White	5–7, 2–6
Loss	3–4	Jun 1990	Birmingham, England	Grass	(United States) Gretchen Magers	(Soviet Union) Larisa Savchenko (Soviet Union) Natalia Zvereva	6–3, 3–6, 3–6
Win	4–4	Jul 1990	Newport, Rhode Island, US	Grass	(United States) Gretchen Magers	(United States) Patty Fendick (United States) Anne Smith	7–6^{(9–7)}, 6–1
Win	5–4	Sep 1990	Leipzig, Germany	Carpet	(United States) Gretchen Magers	(Netherlands) Manon Bollegraf (United Kingdom) Jo Durie	6–2, 4–6, 6–3
Win	6–4	Feb 1991	Aurora, Colorado, US	Hard	(United States) Gretchen Magers	(United States) Patty Fendick (United States) Lori McNeil	6–4, 6–4
Loss	6–5	Apr 1991	Hilton Head, South Carolina, US	Clay	(United States) Mary Lou Daniels	(West Germany) Claudia Kohde-Kilsch (Soviet Union) Natalia Zvereva	4–6, 0–6
Win	7–5	Jul 1991	Westchester, New York, US	Hard	(South Africa) Rosalyn Nideffer	(United States) Katrina Adams (United States) Lori McNeil	7–5, 6–4
Loss	7–6	Aug 1991	Albuquerque, New Mexico, US	Hard	(United States) Mareen Harper	(United States) Katrina Adams (France) Isabelle Demongeot	7–6^{(7–2)}, 4–6, 3–6

== ITF finals ==
=== Singles (1–2) ===
$25,000 tournaments
$10,000 tournaments

Result	No.	Date	Tournament	Surface	Opponent	Score
Loss	1.	8 June 1985	Boynton Beach, United States	Hard	(United States) Halle Cioffi	w/o
Loss	2.	7 June 1987	Boca Raton, United States	Clay	(South Africa) Kim Labuschagne	6–4, 3–6, 3–6
Win	3.	26 July 1987	Pittsburgh, United States	Hard	(United States) Jennifer Santrock	4–6, 7–5, 7–6^{(5)}

=== Doubles: (7–1) ===
Result	No	Date	Tournament	Surface	Partner	Opponent	Score
Win	1.	16 June 1986	Birmingham, United States	Clay	(Mexico) Heliane Steden	(United States) Ann Etheredge (United States) Sonia Hahn	6–4, 2–6, 6–4
Win	2.	23 June 1986	Seabrook, United States	Clay	(Netherlands) Manon Bollegraf	(Australia) Alison Scott (Australia) Michelle Turk	6–2, 6–1
Win	3.	1 June 1987	Brandon, United States	Clay	(Netherlands) Ingelise Driehuis	(United States) Kathy Foxworth (United States) Tammy Whittington	7–6^{(3)}, 6–7^{(8)}, 6–4
Win	4.	8 June 1987	Key Biscayne, United States	Hard	(Netherlands) Ingelise Driehuis	(United States) Kathy Foxworth (United States) Tammy Whittington	3–6, 7–6^{(4)}, 6–2
Win	5.	15 June 1987	Birmingham, United States	Hard	(Netherlands) Ingelise Driehuis	(United States) Katrina Adams (United States) Sonia Hahn	6–7^{(0)}, 6–4, 6–2
Win	6.	29 June 1987	Litchfield, United States	Clay	(Netherlands) Ingelise Driehuis	(South Africa) Paulette Roux (United States) Rita Winebarger	7–5, 6–2
Win	7.	6 July 1987	Seabrook, United States	Clay	(Netherlands) Ingelise Driehuis	(United States) Kathy Foxworth (United States) Tammy Whittington	6–1, 6–2
Loss	8.	13 November 1989	Telford, United Kingdom	Hard	(South Africa) Linda Barnard	(Finland) Anne Aallonen (Netherlands) Simone Schilder	3–6, 6–7
