= Sandy Collins (tennis) =

American tennis player

- Country (sports): United States
- Born: October 13, 1958 (age 67) San Bernardino, California, United States
- Turned pro: 1978
- Retired: 1995
- Prize money: $610,261

Singles
- Career record: 264–273
- Career titles: 0
- Highest ranking: No. 17 (Aug. 18, 1981)

Grand Slam singles results
- Australian Open: 2R (1984, 1988)
- French Open: 3R (1981, 1982)
- Wimbledon: 3R (1981)
- US Open: 2R (1982, 1984)

Doubles
- Career record: 247–249
- Career titles: 3 WTA, 2 ITF
- Highest ranking: No. 17 (May 11, 1992)

Grand Slam doubles results
- Australian Open: QF (1987, 1988)
- French Open: QF (1991)
- Wimbledon: 3R (1982, 1983, 1984, 1986, 1992)
- US Open: QF (1991, 1993)

Sandy Collins (born October 13, 1958) is a retired American professional tennis player who played from the late 1970s until 1995.

Collins is a native of San Bernardino, California. Sandy went to Odessa College, where she played tennis for Coach Virginia Brown and the Wranglers. After two seasons, she transferred to the University of Texas of the Permian Basin, where she completed her college career.

During her professional career, she won four doubles tournaments on the WTA tour. Collins spent the next 17 years on the pro tennis tour, beating Billie Jean King in her second year as well as Tracy Austin (then ranked #2 in the world) in the quarterfinals of the German Open. At different times in her career, Collins was ranked as high as 17th in the world in singles and doubles. She became the first tennis player to be endorsed by Oakley Sunglasses. After retirement, Collins coached privately for a time, eventually taking a job at Texas Tech University (1999) as the women's tennis assistant coach and then named head coach in November 2002. She is currently the associate AD/event operations and sports administrator (women's volleyball/men's tennis) at Texas Tech University.

== WTA Tour finals ==
=== Singles 1 ===
Legend
Grand Slam	0
WTA Championships	0
Tier I	0
Tier II	0
Tier III	0
Tier IV & V	0

Result	W/L	Date	Tournament	Surface	Opponent	Score
Loss	0–1	Feb 1983	Hershey, US	Hard	(Canada) Carling Bassett	6–2, 0–6, 4–6

=== Doubles 18 (4–14) ===
Legend
Grand Slam	0
WTA Championships	0
Tier I	0
Tier II	0
Tier III	0
Tier IV & V	0

Titles by surface
Hard	3
Clay	0
Grass	0
Carpet	1

Result	No.	Date	Tournament	Surface	Partner	Opponents	Score
Win	1.	Sep 1983	Kansas City, Missouri, US	Hard	(Australia) Elizabeth Sayers	(Australia) Chris O'Neil (Australia) Brenda Remilton	7–5, 7–6
Loss	2.	Mar 1984	Dallas, Texas, US	Carpet	(Australia) Elizabeth Sayers	(United States) Leslie Allen (United States) Anne White	4–6, 7–5, 2–6
Loss	3.	May 1984	Johannesburg, South Africa	Hard	(United States) Andrea Leand	(South Africa) Rosalyn Fairbank (South Africa) Beverly Mould	1–6, 2–6
Loss	4.	Oct 1985	Indianapolis, Indiana, US	Hard	(United States) Penny Barg	(United States) Bonnie Gadusek (United States) Mary-Lou Daniels	1–6, 0–6
Loss	5.	Mar 1986	Hershey, Pennsylvania, US	Hard	(United States) Kim Sands	(United States) Candy Reynolds (United States) Anne Smith	6–7, 1–6
Win	6.	Oct 1986	Tokyo, Japan	Hard	(United States) Sharon Walsh-Pete	(United States) Susan Mascarin (United States) Betsy Nagelsen	6–1, 6–2
Loss	7.	Oct 1986	Singapore	Hard	(United States) Sharon Walsh-Pete	(United States) Anna-Maria Fernandez (New Zealand) Julie Richardson	3–6, 2–6
Loss	8.	Apr 1987	Tokyo, Japan	Hard	(United States) Sharon Walsh-Pete	(United States) Kathy Jordan (United States) Betsy Nagelsen	3–6, 5–7
Loss	9.	Apr 1987	Taipei	Carpet	(United States) Sharon Walsh-Pete	(United States) Cammy MacGregor (United States) Cynthia MacGregor	6–7, 7–5, 4–6
Loss	10.	Feb 1989	Wichita, Kansas, US	Hard	(Soviet Union) Leila Meskhi	(Netherlands) Manon Bollegraf (South Africa) Lise Gregory	2–6, 6–7
Loss	11.	Oct 1990	Scottsdale, Arizona, US	Hard	(United States) Ronni Reis	(United States) Elise Burgin (Canada) Helen Kelesi	4–6, 2–6
Loss	12.	Jun 1991	Birmingham, England	Grass	(South Africa) Elna Reinach	(Australia) Nicole Provis (Australia) Liz Smylie	3–6, 4–6
Win	13.	Oct 1991	Milan, Italy	Carpet	(United States) Lori McNeil	(Belgium) Sabine Appelmans (Italy) Raffaella Reggi	7–6, 6–3
Loss	14.	Nov 1991	Scottsdale, Arizona, US	Hard	(South Africa) Elna Reinach	(United States) Mareen Harper (United States) Cammy MacGregor	5–7, 6–3, 3–6
Win	15.	Nov 1991	Brentwood, Tennessee, US	Hard	(South Africa) Elna Reinach	(Indonesia) Yayuk Basuki (Netherlands) Caroline Vis	5–7, 6–4, 7–6
Loss	16.	Feb 1992	Osaka, Japan	Carpet	(Australia) Rachel McQuillan	(Australia) Rennae Stubbs (Czechoslovakia) Helena Suková	6–3, 4–6, 5–7
Loss	17.	Jun 1992	Birmingham, England	Grass	(South Africa) Elna Reinach	(United States) Lori McNeil (Australia) Rennae Stubbs	7–5, 3–6, 6–8
Loss	18.	Nov 1992	Indianapolis, Indiana, US	Hard	(United States) Mary-Lou Daniels	(United States) Katrina Adams (South Africa) Elna Reinach	7–5, 2–6, 4–6
