= Terry Phelps =

American tennis player (born 1966)

- Country (sports): United States
- Residence: Unknown
- Born: December 18, 1966 (age 59) Larchmont, New York, U.S.
- Prize money: US$586,311

Singles
- Career record: 141–129
- Career titles: 0 WTA, 0 ITF titles
- Highest ranking: No. 20 (May 26, 1986)

Grand Slam singles results
- Australian Open: 2R (1987, 1990)
- French Open: QF (1985)
- Wimbledon: 3R (1986, 1988)
- US Open: 4R (1988)

Doubles
- Career record: 95–110
- Career titles: 1 WTA, 0 ITF titles
- Highest ranking: No. 37 (February 13, 1986)

Terry Phelps (born December 18, 1966) is a former professional women's tennis player who is best known for reaching the quarterfinals of the French Open in 1985. She reached No. 20 in the world rankings on May 26, 1986, her career high.

== Career finals ==
=== Singles (2 runner-ups) ===
Legend
Grand Slam (0)
WTA Championships
Tier I (0)
Tier II (0)
Tier III (0)
Tier IV (1)
Tier V (1)
VS (1)

Result	W-L	Date	Tournament	Surface	Opponent	Score
Loss	0–1	Jan 1987	Auckland, New Zealand	Hard	(United States) Gretchen Magers	6–2, 6–3
Loss	0–2	Jul 1988	Schenectady, United States	Hard	(United States) Gretchen Magers	7–6, 6–4

== Grand Slam singles performance timeline ==
Key
W	F	SF	QF	#R	RR	Q#	DNQ	A	NH

(W) winner; (F) finalist; (SF) semifinalist; (QF) quarterfinalist; (#R) rounds 4, 3, 2, 1; (RR) round-robin stage; (Q#) qualification round; (DNQ) did not qualify; (A) absent; (NH) not held; (SR) strike rate (events won / competed); (W–L) win–loss record.

Tournament	1983	1984	1985	1986	1987	1988	1989	1990	W–L
Australian Open	A	A	A	A	2R	A	1R	2R	2–3
French Open	1R	1R	QF	3R	3R	1R	1R	1R	8–8
Wimbledon	1R	1R	2R	3R	1R	3R	2R	2R	7–8
U.S. Open	3R	1R	3R	2R	2R	4R	3R	1R	11–8
