= Ronni Reis =

American tennis player (born 1966)

- Country (sports): United States
- Born: May 10, 1966 (age 60)
- College: University of Miami
- Prize money: $157,628

Singles
- Career record: 73–62
- Highest ranking: No. 78 (February 27, 1989)

Doubles
- Career record: 77–61
- Career titles: 2
- Highest ranking: No. 31 (August 1, 1988)
Medal record
Maccabiah Games
Gold medal – first place	1985 Israel	Women's Singles
Gold medal – first place	1985 Israel	Women's Doubles
Gold medal – first place	1985 Israel	Mixed Doubles

Ronni Reis (sometimes spelled Ronnie Reis; also Ronni Reis-Bernstein) (born May 10, 1966) is an American former tennis player. Reis won three gold medals at the 1985 Maccabiah Games in Israel, the doubles bronze medal at the 1986 Goodwill Games, and the doubles gold medal at the 1987 Pan American Games.

Reis played for the Miami Hurricanes at the University of Miami, where she won the NCAA doubles tournament in 1986 and was named the NCAA Senior Player of the Year in 1988.

== Biography ==
She attended Miami Sunset High School in Miami, Florida. Reis won the 1984 Florida state singles championship while a senior in high school.

Reis won the gold medal, defeating American Jamie Golder, in the women's singles tennis event at the 1985 Maccabiah Games in Israel, when she was 19 years old. She also won the women's doubles (with Eileen Tell) and the mixed doubles at the 1985 Maccabiah Games. She won the doubles bronze medal at the 1986 Goodwill Games, and the doubles gold medal at the 1987 Pan American Games.

She played collegiate tennis at the University of Miami, partnering with Lise Gregory to win the NCAA tournament in 1986; they finished the season 29-0. Reis was named All-American every year in which she played, in both singles and doubles, winning eight such honors in total. She was named by Tennis Magazine to its Collegiate All-Star team in 1986, 1987, and 1988 and was picked for the USTA Federation Cup team those years. She was the NCAA Senior Player of the Year in 1988.

Reis played two years on the pro circuit, and her highest ranking was 78th in singles (February 27, 1989) and 31st in doubles (August 1, 1988). She played in four WTA doubles finals.

She was the head women's tennis coach at Florida International University starting in 1997, and subsequently the head women's tennis coach at the University of Michigan.

In 2000, Reis was inducted into the University of Miami Sports Hall of Fame.

== WTA Tour finals ==
=== Doubles 4 (2-1) ===
Legend
Grand Slam	0
WTA Championships	0
Tier I	0
Tier II	0
Tier III	0
Tier IV & V	1

Titles by surface
Hard	1
Clay	0
Grass	0
Carpet	0

Result	No.	Date	Tournament	Surface	Partner	Opponents	Score
Win	1.	Oct 1987	San Juan, Puerto Rico	Hard	(South Africa) Lise Gregory	(United States) Cammy MacGregor (United States) Cynthia MacGregor	7–5, 7–5
Win	2.	Jul 1988	Aptos, California, US	Hard	(South Africa) Lise Gregory	(United States) Patty Fendick (Canada) Jill Hetherington	6–3, 6–4
—	3.	Oct 1989	San Juan, Puerto Rico	Hard	(United States) Cammy MacGregor	(United States) Gigi Fernández (United States) Robin White	Rained out
Loss	4.	Oct 1990	Scottsdale, Arizona, US	Hard	(United States) Sandy Collins	(United States) Elise Burgin (Canada) Helen Kelesi	4–6, 2–6
