= 1987 European Open – Singles =

Singles
- 1987 European Open

Final
- Champion: (United States) Chris Evert
- Runner-up: (Bulgaria) Manuela Maleeva
- Score: 6–3, 4–6, 6–2

Details
- Draw: 56
- Seeds: 14

Events
Singles	Doubles
← 1986 ·	WTA Swiss Open	· 1988 →

Raffaella Reggi was the defending champion, but lost in the semifinals to Manuela Maleeva.

Chris Evert won the title by defeating Maleeva 6–3, 4–6, 6–2 in the final.

== Seeds ==
The first eight seeds received a bye to the second round.

1. (United States) Chris Evert (champion)
2. (United States) Zina Garrison (second round)
3. (Bulgaria) Manuela Maleeva (final)
4. (United States) Lori McNeil (semifinals)
5. (United States) Kathy Rinaldi (third round)
6. (Bulgaria) Katerina Maleeva (quarterfinals)
7. (United States) Mary Joe Fernández (quarterfinals)
8. (Italy) Raffaella Reggi (semifinals)
9. (n/a)
10. (United States) Kate Gompert (third round)
11. (n/a)
12. (France) Catherine Tanvier (second round)
13. (United States) Marianne Werdel (first round)
14. (United States) Lisa Bonder (first round)

== Draw ==
=== Key ===
- Q = Qualifier
- WC = Wild card
- LL = Lucky loser
- Alt = Alternate
- ITF = ITF entry
- PR = Protected ranking
- SR = Special ranking
- SE = Special exempt
- JE = Junior exempt
- JR = Junior Accelerator Programme entrant
- CO = College Accelerator Programme entrant
- NG = Next Gen Accelerator Program entrant
- w/o = Walkover
- r = Retired
- d = Defaulted

=== Finals ===
Quarterfinals
1	(United States) Chris Evert	7	6
7	(United States) Mary Joe Fernández	6	1
4	(United States) Lori McNeil	6	6
(Argentina) Mariana Pérez Roldán	1	0
6	(Bulgaria) Katerina Maleeva	1	2
3	(Bulgaria) Manuela Maleeva	6	6
8	(Italy) Raffaella Reggi	6	6
(Czechoslovakia) Iva Budařová	4	4

Semifinals
1	(United States) Chris Evert	6	6
4	(United States) Lori McNeil	0	2
3	(Bulgaria) Manuela Maleeva	6	2	6
8	(Italy) Raffaella Reggi	4	6	2

Final
1	(United States) Chris Evert	6	4	6
3	(Bulgaria) Manuela Maleeva	3	6	2

=== Top half ===
==== Section 1 ====
First round
(France) E Derly	6	5	6
(Soviet Union) S Parkhomenko	3	7	2
(West Germany) C Porwik	6	6
(Australia) M Jaggard	1	1
(Argentina) B Fulco	3	4
10	(United States) K Gompert	6	6
(West Germany) W Probst	3	2
(Peru) L Gildemeister	6	6
(Brazil) N Dias	6	6
(Czechoslovakia) M Pazderová	2	2
(United States) J Golder	3	2
(United States) G Magers	6	6

Second round
1	(United States) C Evert	6	6
(France) E Derly	1	4
(West Germany) C Porwik	3	4
10	(United States) K Gompert	6	6
(Peru) L Gildemeister	6	6
(Brazil) N Dias	3	4
(United States) G Magers	2	2
7	(United States) MJ Fernández	6	6

Third round
1	(United States) C Evert	6	6
10	(United States) K Gompert	3	1
(Peru) L Gildemeister	1	0
7	(United States) MJ Fernández	6	6

Quarterfinals
1	(United States) C Evert	7	6
7	(United States) MJ Fernández	6	1

==== Section 2 ====
First round
(South Africa) D Van Rensburg	5	1
(United States) C Benjamin	7	6
(United States) H Cioffi	6	6
(Australia) J Tremelling	3	1
(South Africa) E Reinach	6	6
13	(United States) M Werdel	3	4
(Soviet Union) L Savchenko	6	6
(Socialist Federal Republic of Yugoslavia) S Goleš	1	1
(Switzerland) E Zardo	1	2
(Argentina) M Pérez Roldán	6	6
(Austria) P Huber	6	6
(United States) T Mochizuki	1	2

Second round
4	(United States) L McNeil	2	6	6
(United States) C Benjamin	6	4	2
(United States) H Cioffi	6	6
(South Africa) E Reinach	2	1
(Soviet Union) L Savchenko	6	6	3
(Argentina) M Pérez Roldán	7	3	6
(Austria) P Huber	2	2
5	(United States) K Rinaldi	6	6

Third round
4	(United States) L McNeil	6	7
(United States) H Cioffi	3	5
(Argentina) M Pérez Roldán	2	6	6
5	(United States) K Rinaldi	6	3	2

Quarterfinals
4	(United States) L McNeil	6	6
(Argentina) M Pérez Roldán	1	0

=== Bottom half ===
==== Section 3 ====
First round
(Brazil) G Miró	1	1
(Australia) N Provis	6	6
(Italy) L Ferrando	7	6
(Italy) L Golarsa	5	2
(Czechoslovakia) R Maršíková	6	6
14	(United States) L Bonder	3	2
(West Germany) S Hanika	6	6
(Argentina) M Paz	4	4
(United States) S Sloane	1	6	7
(Switzerland) E Krapl	6	2	5
(Belgium) A Devries	6	4	6
(United States) M Torres	2	6	3

Second round
6	(Bulgaria) K Maleeva	7	6
(Australia) N Provis	6	3
(Italy) L Ferrando	1	2
(Czechoslovakia) R Maršíková	6	6
(West Germany) S Hanika	6	5	5
(United States) S Sloane	1	7	7
(Belgium) A Devries	5	0
3	(Bulgaria) M Maleeva	7	6

Third round
6	(Bulgaria) K Maleeva	6	6
(Czechoslovakia) R Maršíková	0	2
(United States) S Sloane	3	2
3	(Bulgaria) M Maleeva	6	6

Quarterfinals
6	(Bulgaria) K Maleeva	1	2
3	(Bulgaria) M Maleeva	6	6

==== Section 4 ====
First round
(Sweden) C Karlsson	7	6
(Australia) L Field	6	4
(Switzerland) C Cserepy	4	2
(West Germany) G Dinu	6	6
(West Germany) A Betzner	5	6	3
(Switzerland) C Cohen	7	1	6
12	(France) C Tanvier	6	6
(Italy) F Bonsignori	4	4
(Czechoslovakia) I Budařová	6	6
(Hong Kong) P Hy	1	0
(Australia) J Byrne	7	7
(Switzerland) S Jaquet	6	6

Second round
8	(Italy) R Reggi	4	6	6
(Sweden) C Karlsson	6	2	2
(West Germany) G Dinu	6	6	5
(Switzerland) C Cohen	3	7	7
12	(France) C Tanvier	3	3
(Czechoslovakia) I Budařová	6	6
(Australia) J Byrne	4	6	6
2	(United States) Z Garrison	6	4	4

Third round
8	(Italy) R Reggi	2	6	6
(Switzerland) C Cohen	6	4	4
(Czechoslovakia) I Budařová	6	6
(Australia) J Byrne	3	3

Quarterfinals
8	(Italy) R Reggi	6	6
(Czechoslovakia) I Budařová	4	4
