= 1987 European Open – Doubles =

Doubles
- 1987 European Open

Final
- Champions: (United States) Betsy Nagelsen (Australia) Elizabeth Smylie
- Runners-up: (Peru) Laura Gildemeister (France) Catherine Tanvier
- Score: 4–6, 6–4, 6–3

Details
- Draw: 24
- Seeds: 8

Events
Singles	Doubles
← 1986 ·	WTA Swiss Open	· 1988 →

Elise Burgin and Betsy Nagelsen were the defending champions, but Burgin chose to compete at Strasbourg during the same week, playing only in the singles tournament.

Nagelsen teamed up with Elizabeth Smylie and successfully defended her title, by defeating Laura Gildemeister and Catherine Tanvier 4–6, 6–4, 6–3 in the final.

== Seeds ==
The first four seeds received a bye to the second round.

1. (United States) Zina Garrison / (United States) Lori McNeil (second round, withdrew)
2. (United States) Betsy Nagelsen / (Australia) Elizabeth Smylie (champions)
3. (Peru) Laura Gildemeister / (France) Catherine Tanvier (final)
4. (Australia) Jenny Byrne / (Australia) Janine Tremelling (semifinals)
5. (South Africa) Elna Reinach / (South Africa) Dianne Van Rensburg (second round)
6. (Argentina) Mercedes Paz / (Italy) Raffaella Reggi (quarterfinals)
7. (United States) Camille Benjamin / (United States) Gretchen Magers (quarterfinals)
8. (Brazil) Niege Dias / (Socialist Federal Republic of Yugoslavia) Sabrina Goleš (second round)

== Draw ==
=== Key ===
- Q = Qualifier
- WC = Wild card
- LL = Lucky loser
- Alt = Alternate
- ITF = ITF entry
- PR = Protected ranking
- SR = Special ranking
- SE = Special exempt
- JE = Junior exempt
- JR = Junior Accelerator Programme entrant
- CO = College Accelerator Programme entrant
- NG = Next Gen Accelerator Program entrant
- w/o = Walkover
- r = Retired
- d = Defaulted

=== Finals ===
Semifinals
(Sweden) Carina Karlsson (Australia) Nicole Provis	7	3	1
3	(Peru) Laura Gildemeister (France) Catherine Tanvier	6	6	6
4	(Australia) Jenny Byrne (Australia) Janine Tremelling	0	2
2	(United States) Betsy Nagelsen (Australia) Elizabeth Smylie	6	6

Final
3	(Peru) Laura Gildemeister (France) Catherine Tanvier	6	4	3
2	(United States) Betsy Nagelsen (Australia) Elizabeth Smylie	4	6	6

=== Top half ===
First round
(United States) Dena Levy (United States) T Mochizuki	2	6	1
(Australia) L Field (Australia) M Jaggard	6	4	6
(Sweden) C Karlsson (Australia) N Provis	6	6
(France) E Derly (Belgium) A Devries	1	1
(West Germany) G Dinu (Italy) L Golarsa	1	3
(Argentina) M Pérez Roldán (United States) M Torres	6	6
(United States) MJ Fernández (United States) M Werdel	3	5
(Czechoslovakia) I Budařová (West Germany) C Porwik	6	7

Second round
1	(United States) Z Garrison (United States) L McNeil
(Australia) L Field (Australia) M Jaggard	w/o
(Sweden) C Karlsson (Australia) N Provis	6	6	6
8	(Brazil) N Dias (Socialist Federal Republic of Yugoslavia) S Goleš	0	7	2
3	(Peru) L Gildemeister (France) C Tanvier	6	6
(Argentina) M Pérez Roldán (United States) M Torres	1	1
(Czechoslovakia) I Budařová (West Germany) C Porwik	1	2
6	(Argentina) M Paz (Italy) R Reggi	6	6

Quarterfinals
(Australia) L Field (Australia) M Jaggard	5	3
(Sweden) C Karlsson (Australia) N Provis	7	6
3	(Peru) L Gildemeister (France) C Tanvier	1	6	6
6	(Argentina) M Paz (Italy) R Reggi	6	3	2

Semifinals
(Sweden) C Karlsson (Australia) N Provis	7	3	1
3	(Peru) L Gildemeister (France) C Tanvier	6	6	6

=== Bottom half ===
First round
(Argentina) B Fulco (Brazil) G Miró	6	6
(Czechoslovakia) M Pazderová (United States) Sylvia Schenck	1	3
(Switzerland) C Cohen (Switzerland) E Krapl	w/o
(Switzerland) C Cserepy (Austria) P Huber
(United States) H Cioffi (United States) S Sloane	7	6
(Switzerland) S Jaquet (Switzerland) SM Villaverde	6	1
(Italy) F Bonsignori (Chile) Natalie Rodríguez	w/o
(West Germany) W Probst (Argentina) P Tarabini

Second round
5	(South Africa) E Reinach (South Africa) D Van Rensburg	4	4
(Argentina) B Fulco (Brazil) G Miró	6	6
(Switzerland) C Cohen (Switzerland) E Krapl	5	4
4	(Australia) J Byrne (Australia) J Tremelling	7	6
7	(United States) C Benjamin (United States) G Magers	6	6
(United States) H Cioffi (United States) S Sloane	0	1
(Italy) F Bonsignori (Chile) N Rodríguez	2	2
2	(United States) B Nagelsen (Australia) E Smylie	6	6

Quarterfinals
(Argentina) B Fulco (Brazil) G Miró
4	(Australia) J Byrne (Australia) J Tremelling	w/o
7	(United States) C Benjamin (United States) G Magers	3	0
2	(United States) B Nagelsen (Australia) E Smylie	6	6

Semifinals
4	(Australia) J Byrne (Australia) J Tremelling	0	2
2	(United States) B Nagelsen (Australia) E Smylie	6	6
