= Nathalie Tauziat career statistics =

Career finals
Discipline	Type	Won	Lost	Total
Singles	Grand Slam	0	1	1
Singles	Summer Olympics	–	–	–
Singles	WTA Finals (Note: Formerly known as: Virginia Slims Championships (until 1995); WTA Tour Championships (until 2014))	–	–	–
Singles	WTA 1000 (Note: Formerly known as: Category 4 & 5 & 6 (until 1990); Tier I (until 2009); WTA Premier Mandatory and 5 (until 2021))	1	1	2
Singles	WTA 500 (Note: Formerly known as: Category 3 (until 1990); Tier II (until 2009); WTA Premier (until 2021))	3	5	8
Singles	WTA 250 (Note: Formerly known as: Category 1 & 2 (until 1990); Tier III & IV & V (until 2009); WTA International (until 2021))	4	7	11
Singles	Total	8	14	22
Doubles	Grand Slam	0	1	1
Doubles	Summer Olympics	–	–	–
Doubles	WTA Finals	0	2	2
Doubles	WTA 1000	4	7	11
Doubles	WTA 500	9	10	19
Doubles	WTA 250	12	12	23
Doubles	Total	25	32	57
Total		33	46	79

This is a list of the main career statistics of French professional tennis player Nathalie Tauziat.

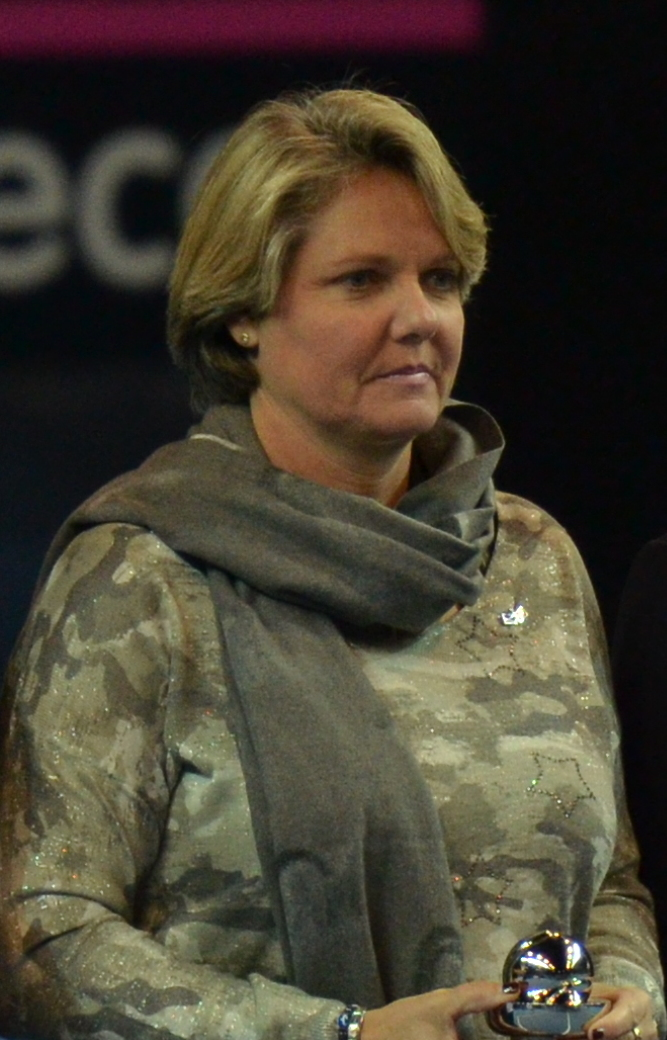
Tauziat at the 2016 Billie Jean King Cup (Fed Cup).

== Performance timelines ==
Key
W	F	SF	QF	#R	RR	Q#	P#	DNQ	A	Z#	PO	G	S	B	NMS	NTI	P	NH

(W) winner; (F) finalist; (SF) semifinalist; (QF) quarterfinalist; (#R) rounds 4, 3, 2, 1; (RR) round-robin stage; (Q#) qualification round; (P#) preliminary round; (DNQ) did not qualify; (A) absent; (Z#) Davis/Fed Cup Zonal Group (with number indication) or (PO) play-off; (G) gold, (S) silver or (B) bronze Olympic/Paralympic medal; (NMS) not a Masters tournament; (NTI) not a Tier I tournament; (P) postponed; (NH) not held; (SR) strike rate (events won / competed); (W–L) win–loss record.
To avoid confusion and double counting, these charts are updated at the conclusion of a tournament or when the player's participation has ended.

=== Singles ===
Tournament	1984	1985	1986	1987	1988	1989	1990	1991	1992	1993	1994	1995	1996	1997	1998	1999	2000	2001	SR	W–L
Australian Open	A	A	NH	A	A	A	A	A	A	4R	1R	A	A	A	A	A	2R	A	0 / 3	4–3
French Open	1R	3R	2R	4R	4R	1R	4R	QF	4R	3R	2R	3R	2R	3R	1R	2R	3R	1R	0 / 18	30–18
Wimbledon	A	LQ	2R	2R	2R	1R	4R	4R	QF	4R	3R	3R	3R	QF	F	QF	1R	QF	0 / 16	40–16
US Open	A	LQ	1R	2R	2R	3R	4R	1R	2R	4R	2R	3R	2R	1R	4R	3R	QF	4R	0 / 16	27–16
Win–loss																			0 / 53	101–53
Career statistics
Year-end ranking	296	112	66	25	26	25	18	13	14	18	35	27	22	11	10	7	10	13		

=== Doubles ===
Tournament	1984	1985	1986	1987	1988	1989	1990	1991	1992	1993	1994	1995	1996	1997	1998	1999	2000	2001	2002	2003	SR
Australian Open	A	A	NH	A	A	A	A	A	A	3R	2R	A	A	A	A	A	2R	A	A	A	0 / 3
French Open	A	1R	3R	QF	3R	3R	SF	3R	QF	QF	SF	QF	3R	SF	QF	SF	SF	QF	2R	1R	0 / 19
Wimbledon	A	3R	1R	2R	3R	1R	3R	3R	3R	2R	3R	3R	2R	3R	2R	2R	2R	SF	QF	A	0 / 18
US Open	A	2R	1R	1R	1R	3R	2R	3R	3R	2R	1R	QF	1R	QF	2R	3R	3R	F	A	A	0 / 17
Win–loss																					0 / 57
Career statistics
Year-end ranking	272	85	63	40	28	28	18	38	61	29	22	20	14	13	7	14	9	5	105	397	

== Significant finals ==
=== Grand Slam finals ===
==== Singles: 1 (1 runner-up) ====
Result	Year	Championship	Surface	Opponent	Score
Loss	1998	Wimbledon	Grass	(Czech Republic) Jana Novotná	4–6, 6–7^{(2–7)}

==== Doubles: 1 (1 runner-up) ====
Result	Year	Championship	Surface	Partner	Opponents	Score
Loss	2001	US Open	Hard	(United States) Kimberly Po-Messerli	(United States) Lisa Raymond (Australia) Rennae Stubbs	2–6, 7–5, 5–7

=== Year-end championships ===
==== Doubles: 2 (2 runner-ups) ====
Result	Year	Championship	Surface	Partner	Opponents	Score
Loss	1997	New York	Carpet (i)	(France) Alexandra Fusai	(United States) Lindsay Davenport (Czech Republic) Jana Novotná	7–6^{(7–5)}, 3–6, 2–6
Loss	1998	New York	Carpet (i)	(France) Alexandra Fusai	(United States) Lindsay Davenport (Belarus) Natasha Zvereva	7–6^{(8–6)}, 5–7, 3–6

== WTA Tour finals ==
=== Singles: 22 (8–14) ===
Legend Grand Slam tournaments (0–1) WTA 1000 (Tier I) (1–1) WTA 500 (Category 3 / Tier II) (3–5) WTA 250 (Category 2 / Tier III / Tier IV / Tier V) (4–7)	Surface Hard (0–4) Grass (3–4) Clay (0–1) Carpet (5–5)

Result	W–L	Date	Tournament	Tier	Surface	Opponent	Score
Loss	0–1	Jul 1988	Nice, France	Category 2	Clay	(Italy) Sandra Cecchini	5–7, 4–6
Loss	0–2	Aug 1988	Mahwah, US	Category 3	Hard	(West Germany) Steffi Graf	0–6, 1–6
Loss	0–3	Feb 1990	Wichita, US	Tier IV	Hard (i)	(South Africa) Dinky Van Rensburg	6–2, 5–7, 2–6
Win	1–3	Sep 1990	Bayonne, France	Tier V	Carpet (i)	(Germany) Anke Huber	6–3, 7–6^{(10–8)}
Loss	1–4	Oct 1991	Zürich, Switzerland	Tier II	Carpet (i)	(Germany) Steffi Graf	4–6, 4–6
Loss	1–5	Mar 1992	San Antonio, US	Tier III	Hard	(United States) Martina Navratilova	2–6, 1–6
Loss	1–6	Oct 1992	Bayonne, France	Tier IV	Carpet (i)	(Switzerland) Manuela Maleeva-Fragniere	7–6^{(7–4)}, 2–6, 3–6
Win	2–6	Nov 1993	Québec City, Canada	Tier III	Carpet (i)	(Bulgaria) Katerina Maleeva	6–4, 6–1
Win	3–6	Jun 1995	Eastbourne, UK	Tier II	Grass	(United States) Chanda Rubin	3–6, 6–0, 7–5
Loss	3–7	Jun 1996	Birmingham, UK	Tier III	Grass	(United States) Meredith McGrath	6–2, 4–6, 4–6
Win	4–7	Jun 1997	Birmingham, UK	Tier III	Grass	(Indonesia) Yayuk Basuki	2–6, 6–2, 6–2
Loss	4–8	Oct 1997	Zürich, Switzerland	Tier I	Carpet (i)	(United States) Lindsay Davenport	6–7^{(3–7)}, 5–7
Loss	4–9	Nov 1997	Chicago, US	Tier II	Carpet (i)	(United States) Lindsay Davenport	0–6, 5–7
Loss	4–10	Jul 1998	Wimbledon, UK	Grand Slam	Grass	(Czech Republic) Jana Novotná	4–6, 6–7^{(2–7)}
Loss	4–11	Nov 1998	Leipzig, Germany	Tier II	Carpet (i)	(Germany) Steffi Graf	3–6, 4–6
Loss	4–12	Jun 1999	Birmingham, UK	Tier III	Grass	(France) Julie Halard-Decugis	2–6, 6–3, 4–6
Loss	4–13	Jun 1999	Eastbourne, UK	Tier II	Grass	(Belarus) Natasha Zvereva	6–0, 5–7, 3–6
Win	5–13	Oct 1999	Moscow, Russia	Tier I	Carpet (i)	(Austria) Barbara Schett	2–6, 6–4, 6–1
Win	6–13	Nov 1999	Leipzig, Germany	Tier II	Carpet (i)	(Czech Republic) Květa Hrdličková	6–1, 6–3
Win	7–13	Feb 2000	Paris, France	Tier II	Carpet (i)	(United States) Serena Williams	7–5, 6–2
Loss	7–14	Feb 2001	Dubai, UAE	Tier II	Hard	(Switzerland) Martina Hingis	4–6, 4–6
Win	8–14	Jun 2001	Birmingham, UK	Tier III	Grass	(Netherlands) Miriam Oremans	6–3, 7–5

=== Doubles: 57 (25 titles, 32 runner-ups) ===
Legend Grand Slam tournaments (0–1) Finals (0–2) WTA 1000 (Category 4 / Category 5 / Tier I) (4–7) WTA 500 (Category 3 / Tier II) (9–10) WTA 250 (Category 2 / Tier III / Tier IV / Tier V) (11–12) Virginia Slims (1–0)	Surface Hard (6–10) Grass (1–2) Clay (5–8) Carpet (13–12)

Result	W–L	Date	Tournament	Tier	Surface	Partner	Opponents	Score
Win	1.	Oct 1987	Paris	Virginia Slims	Clay	(France) Isabelle Demongeot	(Italy) Sandra Cecchini (Socialist Federal Republic of Yugoslavia) Sabrina Goleš	1–6, 6–3, 6–3
Win	2.	May 1988	Berlin	Category 5	Clay	(France) Isabelle Demongeot	(West Germany) Claudia Kohde-Kilsch (Czechoslovakia) Helena Suková	6–2, 4–6, 6–4
Loss	1.	Jul 1988	Nice	Category 2	Clay	(France) Isabelle Demongeot	(France) Catherine Suire (France) Catherine Tanvier	4–6, 6–4, 2–6
Win	3.	Oct 1988	Zürich	Category 3	Carpet (i)	(France) Isabelle Demongeot	(West Germany) Claudia Kohde-Kilsch (Czechoslovakia) Helena Suková	6–3, 6–3
Loss	2.	Oct 1988	Brighton	Category 4	Carpet (i)	(France) Isabelle Demongeot	(United States) Lori McNeil (United States) Betsy Nagelsen	6–7^{(5–7)}, 6–2, 6–7^{(4–7)}
Win	4.	May 1989	Hamburg	Category 3	Clay	(France) Isabelle Demongeot	(Czechoslovakia) Jana Novotná (Czechoslovakia) Helena Suková	w/o
Loss	3.	Oct 1989	Zürich	Category 4	Carpet (i)	(Austria) Judith Wiesner	(Czechoslovakia) Jana Novotná (Czechoslovakia) Helena Suková	3–6, 6–3, 4–6
Loss	4.	Feb 1990	Chicago	Tier I	Carpet (i)	(Spain) Arantxa Sánchez Vicario	(United States) Martina Navratilova (United States) Anne Smith	7–6^{(11–9)}, 4–6, 3–6
Win	5.	Oct 1990	Brighton	Tier II	Carpet (i)	(Czechoslovakia) Helena Suková	(United Kingdom) Jo Durie (Soviet Union) Natasha Zvereva	6–1, 6–4
Loss	5.	Apr 1991	Barcelona	Tier III	Clay	(Austria) Judith Wiesner	(United States) Martina Navratilova (Spain) Arantxa Sánchez Vicario	1–6, 3–6
Loss	6.	Aug 1991	San Diego	Tier III	Hard	(United States) Gigi Fernández	(Canada) Jill Hetherington (United States) Kathy Rinaldi	4–6, 6–3, 2–6
Win	6.	Sep 1991	Bayonne	Tier IV	Carpet (i)	(Argentina) Patricia Tarabini	(Australia) Rachel McQuillan (France) Catherine Tanvier	6–3, ret.
Loss	7.	Apr 1992	Barcelona	Tier III	Clay	(Austria) Judith Wiesner	(Spain) Conchita Martínez (Spain) Arantxa Sánchez Vicario	4–6, 1–6
Win	7.	Jan 1993	Melbourne	Tier IV	Hard	(Australia) Nicole Provis	(United States) Cammy MacGregor (United States) Shaun Stafford	1–6, 6–3, 6–3
Loss	8.	Nov 1993	Québec City	Tier III	Carpet (i)	(Bulgaria) Katerina Maleeva	(United States) Katrina Adams (Netherlands) Manon Bollegraf	4–6, 4–6
Loss	9.	Apr 1994	Barcelona	Tier II	Clay	(France) Julie Halard	(Latvia) Larisa Neiland (Spain) Arantxa Sánchez Vicario	2–6, 4–6
Win	8.	Aug 1994	Los Angeles	Tier II	Hard	(France) Julie Halard	(Czech Republic) Jana Novotná (United States) Lisa Raymond	6–1, 0–6, 6–1
Win	9.	Nov 1994	Québec City	Tier III	Carpet (i)	(South Africa) Elna Reinach	(United States) Chanda Rubin (United States) Linda Wild	6–4, 6–3
Win	10.	Feb 1995	Linz	Tier III	Carpet (i)	(United States) Meredith McGrath	(Croatia) Iva Majoli (Austria) Petra Schwarz	6–1, 6–2
Loss	10.	Feb 1996	Paris	Tier II	Clay (i)	(France) Julie Halard-Decugis	(Netherlands) Kristie Boogert (Czech Republic) Jana Novotná	4–6, 3–6
Loss	11.	Mar 1996	Indian Wells	Tier I	Hard	(France) Julie Halard-Decugis	(United States) Chanda Rubin (Netherlands) Brenda Schultz-McCarthy	1–6, 4–6
Loss	12.	Jun 1996	Birmingham	Tier III	Grass	(United States) Lori McNeil	(Australia) Elizabeth Smylie (United States) Linda Wild	3–6, 6–3, 1–6
Win	11.	Oct 1996	Leipzig	Tier II	Carpet (i)	(Netherlands) Kristie Boogert	(Belgium) Sabine Appelmans (Netherlands) Miriam Oremans	6–4, 6–4
Win	12.	Oct 1996	Luxembourg	Tier III	Carpet (i)	(Netherlands) Kristie Boogert	(Germany) Barbara Rittner (Belgium) Dominique Van Roost	2–6, 6–4, 6–2
Loss	13.	Nov 1996	Oakland	Tier II	Carpet (i)	(Romania) Irina Spîrlea	(United States) Lindsay Davenport (United States) Mary Joe Fernández	1–6, 3–6
Win	13.	Feb 1997	Linz	Tier III	Carpet (i)	(France) Alexandra Fusai	(Czech Republic) Eva Melicharová (Czech Republic) Helena Vildová	4–6, 6–3, 6–1
Loss	14.	Mar 1997	Indian Wells	Tier I	Hard	(United States) Lisa Raymond	(United States) Lindsay Davenport (Belarus) Natasha Zvereva	3–6, 2–6
Loss	15.	Aug 1997	Atlanta	Tier II	Hard	(France) Alexandra Fusai	(United States) Nicole Arendt (Netherlands) Manon Bollegraf	7–6^{(7–5)}, 3–6, 2–6
Loss	16.	Oct 1997	Québec City	Tier III	Hard (i)	(France) Alexandra Fusai	(United States) Lisa Raymond (Australia) Rennae Stubbs	4–6, 7–5, 5–7
Win	14.	Nov 1997	Chicago	Tier II	Carpet (i)	(France) Alexandra Fusai	(United States) Lindsay Davenport (United States) Monica Seles	6–3, 6–2
Loss	17.	Nov 1997	Chase Championships	Finals	Carpet (i)	(France) Alexandra Fusai	(United States) Lindsay Davenport (Czech Republic) Jana Novotná	7–6^{(7–5)}, 3–6, 2–6
Win	15.	Feb 1998	Linz	Tier II	Carpet (i)	(France) Alexandra Fusai	(Russia) Anna Kournikova (Latvia) Larisa Neiland	6–3, 3–6, 6–4
Loss	18.	Mar 1998	Indian Wells	Tier I	Hard	(France) Alexandra Fusai	(United States) Lindsay Davenport (Belarus) Natasha Zvereva	4–6, 6–2, 4–6
Loss	19.	May 1998	Berlin	Tier I	Clay	(France) Alexandra Fusai	(United States) Lindsay Davenport (Belarus) Natasha Zvereva	3–6, 0–6
Win	16.	May 1998	Strasbourg	Tier III	Clay	(France) Alexandra Fusai	(Indonesia) Yayuk Basuki (Netherlands) Caroline Vis	6–4, 6–3
Loss	20.	Aug 1998	San Diego	Tier II	Hard	(France) Alexandra Fusai	(United States) Lindsay Davenport (Belarus) Natasha Zvereva	2–6, 1–6
Win	17.	Aug 1998	New Haven	Tier II	Hard	(France) Alexandra Fusai	(South Africa) Mariaan de Swardt (Czech Republic) Jana Novotná	6–1, 6–0
Loss	21.	Nov 1998	Chase Championships	Finals	Carpet (i)	(France) Alexandra Fusai	(United States) Lindsay Davenport (Belarus) Natasha Zvereva	7–6^{(8–6)}, 5–7, 3–6
Win	18.	Feb 1999	Prostějov	Tier IV	Carpet (i)	(France) Alexandra Fusai	(Czech Republic) Květa Hrdličková (Czech Republic) Helena Vildová	3–6, 6–2, 6–1
Loss	22.	Feb 1999	Hanover	Tier II	Carpet (i)	(France) Alexandra Fusai	(United States) Serena Williams (United States) Venus Williams	7–5, 2–6, 2–6
Loss	23.	May 1999	Rome	Tier I	Clay	(France) Alexandra Fusai	(Switzerland) Martina Hingis (Russia) Anna Kournikova	2–6, 2–6
Win	19.	May 1999	Berlin	Tier I	Clay	(France) Alexandra Fusai	(Czech Republic) Jana Novotná (Argentina) Patricia Tarabini	6–3, 7–5
Loss	24.	May 1999	Strasbourg	Tier III	Clay	(France) Alexandra Fusai	(Russia) Elena Likhovtseva (Japan) Ai Sugiyama	6–2, 6–7^{(6–8)}, 1–6
Loss	25.	Oct 1999	Zürich	Tier I	Hard (i)	(Belarus) Natasha Zvereva	(United States) Lindsay Davenport (Australia) Rennae Stubbs	2–6, 2–6
Loss	26.	Feb 2000	Tokyo	Tier I	Carpet (i)	(France) Alexandra Fusai	(Switzerland) Martina Hingis (France) Mary Pierce	4–6, 1–6
Win	20.	Jun 2000	Eastbourne	Tier II	Grass	(Japan) Ai Sugiyama	(United States) Lisa Raymond (Australia) Rennae Stubbs	2–6, 6–3, 7–6^{(7–3)}
Win	21.	Aug 2000	Montreal	Tier I	Hard	(Switzerland) Martina Hingis	(France) Julie Halard-Decugis (Japan) Ai Sugiyama	6–3, 3–6, 6–4
Win	22.	Sep 2000	Luxembourg	Tier III	Carpet (i)	(France) Alexandra Fusai	(Bulgaria) Lubomira Bacheva (Spain) Cristina Torrens Valero	6–3, 7–6^{(7–0)}
Loss	27.	Oct 2000	Linz	Tier II	Carpet (i)	(Japan) Ai Sugiyama	(France) Amélie Mauresmo (United States) Chanda Rubin	4–6, 4–6
Loss	28.	Feb 2001	Paris	Tier II	Carpet (i)	(United States) Kimberly Po	(Croatia) Iva Majoli (France) Virginie Razzano	3–6, 5–7
Loss	29.	Feb 2001	Nice	Tier II	Carpet (i)	(United States) Kimberly Po	(France) Émilie Loit (France) Anne-Gaëlle Sidot	6–1, 2–6, 0–6
Win	23.	Mar 2001	Key Biscayne	Tier I	Hard	(Spain) Arantxa Sánchez Vicario	(United States) Lisa Raymond (Australia) Rennae Stubbs	6–0, 6–4
Loss	30.	Jun 2001	Birmingham	Tier III	Grass	(United States) Kimberly Po-Messerli	(Zimbabwe) Cara Black (Russia) Elena Likhovtseva	1–6, 2–6
Win	24.	Aug 2001	Los Angeles	Tier II	Hard	(United States) Kimberly Po-Messerli	(United States) Nicole Arendt (Netherlands) Caroline Vis	6–3, 7–5
Loss	31.	Sep 2001	US Open	Grand Slam	Hard	(United States) Kimberly Po-Messerli	(United States) Lisa Raymond (Australia) Rennae Stubbs	2–6, 7–5, 5–7
Win	25.	Sept 2001	Leipzig	Tier II	Carpet (i)	(Russia) Elena Likhovtseva	(Czech Republic) Květa Hrdličková (Germany) Barbara Rittner	6–4, 6–2
Loss	32.	Jun 2002	Birmingham	Tier III	Grass	(United States) Kimberly Po-Messerli	(Japan) Shinobu Asagoe (Belgium) Els Callens	4–6, 3–6

== ITF Circuit finals ==
=== Singles: 3 titles ===
Legend
$50,000 tournaments
$25,000 tournaments

Result	W–L	Date	Tournament	Tier	Surface	Opponent	Score
Win	1.	30 March 1987	Limoges, France	25,000	Clay	(Czechoslovakia) Regina Rajchrtová	6–1, 2–6, 6–1
Win	2.	9 December 1991	Val-d'Oise, France	50,000	Hard	(France) Isabelle Demongeot	3–6, 6–3, 6–1
Win	3.	7 December 1992	Val-d'Oise, France	25,000	Hard	(Germany) Christina Singer	6–3, 6–3

=== Doubles: 4 (2 titles, 2 runner-ups) ===
Legend
$25,000 tournaments
$10,000 tournaments

Result	W–L	Date	Tournament	Tier	Surface	Partner	Opponents	Score
Loss	1.	11 June 1984	Lyon, France	10,000	Clay	(France) Isabelle Demongeot	(Argentina) Mercedes Paz (United States) Ronni Reis	6–1, 3–6, 3–6
Loss	2.	31 December 1984	Chicago, United States	10,000	Hard	(France) Isabelle Demongeot	(United States) Lynn Lewis (Canada) Wendy Barlow	6–4, 6–7, 5–7
Win	3.	21 January 1985	San Antonio, United States	10,000	Hard	(France) Isabelle Demongeot	(Sweden) Elisabeth Ekblom (Netherlands) Marianne van der Torre	6–3, 6–4
Win	4.	30 March 1987	Limoges, France	25,000	Clay	(France) Isabelle Demongeot	(Switzerland) Céline Cohen (Switzerland) Eva Krapl	7–5, 6–2

== Best Grand Slam results details ==
=== Singles ===
	Australian Open			
1993 Australian Open (13th seed)
Round	Opponent	Rank	Score	NTR
1R	(Georgia (country)) Leila Meskhi	No. 24	5–7, 6–4, 6–4	No. 16
2R	(Germany) Wiltrud Probst	No. 45	6–2, 4–6, 6–2	No. 16
3R	(Finland) Nanne Dahlman	No. 64	6–2, 6–1	No. 16
4R	(Federal Republic of Yugoslavia) Monica Seles (1)	No. 1	2–6, 0–6	No. 16

	French Open			
1991 French Open (13th seed)
Round	Opponent	Rank	Score	NTR
1R	(France) Pascale Etchemendy (WC)	No. 228	6–3, 6–1	No. 14
2R	(France) Nathalie Guerrée (WC)	No. 134	6–2, 6–1	No. 14
3R	(Netherlands) Nicole Jagerman	No. 157	6–4, 6–0	No. 14
4R	(Japan) Naoko Sawamatsu	No. 35	7–5, 2–6, 12–10	No. 14
QF	(Germany) Steffi Graf (2)	No. 2	3–6, 2–6	No. 14

	Wimbledon Championships			
1998 Wimbledon (16th seed)
Round	Opponent	Rank	Score	NTR
1R	(Japan) Haruka Inoue (Q)	No. 113	2–6, 6–1, 6–3	No. 15
2R	(Croatia) Iva Majoli	No. 18	6–0, 6–1	No. 15
3R	(France) Julie Halard-Decugis	No. 40	7–6^{(7–5)}, 3–6, 6–4	No. 15
4R	(United Kingdom) Samantha Smith (WC)	No. 94	6–3, 6–1	No. 15
QF	(United States) Lindsay Davenport (2)	No. 2	6–3, 6–3	No. 15
SF	(Belarus) Natasha Zvereva	No. 22	1–6, 7–6^{(7–1)}, 6–3	No. 15
F	(Czech Republic) Jana Novotná (3)	No. 3	4–6, 6–7^{(2–7)}	No. 15

	US Open			
2000 US Open (8th seed)
Round	Opponent	Rank	Score	NTR
1R	(Slovakia) Ľudmila Cervanová (Q)	No. 160	3–6, 6–2, 6–4	No. 8
2R	(Venezuela) María Vento	No. 103	6–3, 6–1	No. 8
3R	(Chinese Taipei) Janet Lee (Q)	No. 133	6–3, 6–2	No. 8
4R	(Spain) Arantxa Sánchez Vicario (9)	No. 9	6–3, 6–2	No. 8
QF	(United States) Venus Williams (3)	No. 3	4–6, 6–1, 1–6	No. 8
