= 1988 WTA Nice Open – Singles =

Singles
- 1988 WTA Nice Open

Final
- Champion: (Italy) Sandra Cecchini
- Runner-up: (Italy) Nathalie Tauziat
- Score: 7–5, 6–4

Details
- Draw: 16
- Seeds: 8

Events
Singles	Doubles
WTA Nice Open

Sandra Cecchini won in the final 7–5, 6–4 against Nathalie Tauziat.

== Seeds ==
A champion seed is indicated in bold text while text in italics indicates the round in which that seed was eliminated.

1. n/a
2. (Italy) **Sandra Cecchini (champion)**
3. (France) Pascale Paradis (first round)
4. (Argentina) Bettina Fulco (semifinals)
5. (Austria) Judith Wiesner (first round)
6. (France) Nathalie Tauziat (final)
7. (Argentina) Patricia Tarabini (quarterfinals)
8. (Austria) Barbara Paulus (quarterfinals)

== Draw ==
=== Key ===
- Q = Qualifier
- WC = Wild card
- LL = Lucky loser
- Alt = Alternate
- SE = Special exempt
- PR = Protected ranking
- ITF = ITF entry
- JE = Junior exempt
- w/o = Walkover
- r = Retired
- d = Defaulted
- SR = Special ranking

First round
LL	(Italy) S Simmonds	0	2
Q	(West Germany) **S Frankl**	**6**	**6**
(France) C Tanvier	0	1
(Austria) **P Huber**	**6**	**6**
(Netherlands) H ter Riet	5	2
(Argentina) **A Villagrán**	**7**	**6**
(West Germany) S Auer	4	0
6	(France) **N Tauziat**	**6**	**6**
4	(Argentina) **B Fulco**	**6**	**6**
(Switzerland) M Strebel	0	1
Q	(France) **K Quentrec**	**6**	**7**
(Italy) L Ferrando	4	6
(France) E Derly	3	6
(Poland) **I Kuczyńska**	**6**	**7**
(United States) M Torres	1	**6**	5
7	(Argentina) **P Tarabini**	**6**	2	**7**
5	(Austria) J Wiesner	**6**	3	1
(Italy) **L Garrone**	1	**6**	**6**
LL	(France) **P Etchemendy**	**6**	**6**
(France) N Herreman	0	2
(France) C Suire	1	2
(France) **I Demongeot**	**6**	**6**
Q	(France) **N Guerrée**	**6**	**6**
3	(France) P Paradis	2	2
8	(Austria) **B Paulus**	**6**	4	**7**
(Spain) C Martínez	3	**6**	5
(Socialist Federal Republic of Yugoslavia) **S Goleš**	**6**	6	**6**
Q	(Sweden) C Dahlman	4	**7**	1
(Italy) F Bonsignori	**6**	0	3
(Switzerland) **S Jaquet**	4	**6**	**6**
(France) A Dechaume	0	0
2	(Italy) **S Cecchini**	**6**	**6**

Second round
Q	(West Germany) **S Frankl**	**6**	3	**7**
(Austria) P Huber	3	**6**	6
(Argentina) A Villagrán	3	3
6	(France) **N Tauziat**	**6**	**6**
4	(Argentina) **B Fulco**	2	**6**	**6**
Q	(France) K Quentrec	**6**	1	1
(Poland) I Kuczyńska	**6**	3	1
7	(Argentina) **P Tarabini**	3	**6**	**6**
(Italy) **L Garrone**	2	**6**	**6**
LL	(France) P Etchemendy	**6**	1	1
(France) **I Demongeot**	**6**	**7**
Q	(France) N Guerrée	3	6
8	(Austria) **B Paulus**	**7**	**7**
(Socialist Federal Republic of Yugoslavia) S Goleš	5	6
(Switzerland) S Jaquet	2	1
2	(Italy) **S Cecchini**	**6**	**6**

Quarterfinals
Q	(West Germany) S Frankl	0	2
6	(France) **N Tauziat**	**6**	**6**
4	(Argentina) **B Fulco**	**6**	**7**
7	(Argentina) P Tarabini	1	5
(Italy) L Garrone	2	3
(France) **I Demongeot**	**6**	**6**
8	(Austria) B Paulus	3	**6**	1
2	(Italy) **S Cecchini**	**6**	2	**6**

Semifinals
6	(France) **N Tauziat**	**6**	**6**
4	(Argentina) B Fulco	3	4
(France) I Demongeot	**6**	1	5
2	(Italy) **S Cecchini**	2	**6**	**7**

Final
6	(France) Nathalie Tauziat	5	4
2	(Italy) **Sandra Cecchini**	**7**	**6**
