= 1986 European Open – Doubles =

Doubles
- 1986 European Open

Final
- Champions: (United States) Elise Burgin (United States) Betsy Nagelsen
- Runners-up: (Australia) Jenny Byrne (Australia) Janine Thompson
- Score: 6–2, 6–3

Details
- Draw: 32
- Seeds: 8

Events
| Singles | Doubles |
| ← 1985 · | WTA Swiss Open | · 1987 → |

Bonnie Gadusek and Helena Suková were the defending champions, but none competed this year.

Elise Burgin and Betsy Nagelsen won the title by defeating Jenny Byrne and Janine Thompson 6–2, 6–3 in the final.

== Seeds ==
1. (United States) Elise Burgin / (United States) Betsy Nagelsen (champions)
2. (West Germany) Bettina Bunge / (West Germany) Eva Pfaff (semifinals)
3. (Soviet Union) Svetlana Parkhomenko / (Soviet Union) Larisa Savchenko (quarterfinals)
4. (Netherlands) Marcella Mesker / (France) Pascale Paradis (semifinals)
5. (United States) Terry Phelps / (Italy) Raffaella Reggi (first round)
6. (Bulgaria) Katerina Maleeva / (Bulgaria) Manuela Maleeva (second round)
7. (France) Catherine Suire / (Argentina) Adriana Villagrán (first round)
8. (United States) Penny Barg / (United States) Beth Herr (quarterfinals)

== Draw ==
=== Key ===
- Q = Qualifier
- WC = Wild card
- LL = Lucky loser
- Alt = Alternate
- SE = Special exempt
- PR = Protected ranking
- ITF = ITF entry
- JE = Junior exempt
- w/o = Walkover
- r = Retired
- d = Defaulted
- SR = Special ranking

=== Finals ===
Semifinals
1 | (United States) Elise Burgin (United States) Betsy Nagelsen | 6 | 7
4 | (Netherlands) Marcella Mesker (France) Pascale Paradis | 2 | 5
(Australia) Jenny Byrne (Australia) Janine Thompson | 2 | 7 | 6
2 | (West Germany) Bettina Bunge (West Germany) Eva Pfaff | 6 | 6 | 2

Final
1 | (United States) Elise Burgin (United States) Betsy Nagelsen | 6 | 6
(Australia) Jenny Byrne (Australia) Janine Thompson | 2 | 3

=== Top half ===
First round
1 | (United States) E Burgin (United States) B Nagelsen | 6 | 6
(Japan) E Okagawa (Japan) N Sato | 4 | 4
(Brazil) N Dias (Brazil) P Medrado | 5 | 1
(Australia) L Field (Australia) A Minter | 7 | 6
(Sweden) M Lindström (United States) P Smith | 6 | 6
(Australia) N Provis (Australia) A Tobin-Dingwall | 3 | 3
(United States) A Henricksson (Switzerland) C Jolissaint | 7 | 4 | 7
5 | (United States) T Phelps (Italy) R Reggi | 6 | 6 | 6
4 | (Netherlands) M Mesker (France) P Paradis | 6 | 6
(Switzerland) L Drescher (Greece) A Kanellopoulou | 4 | 1
(United States) V Nelson-Dunbar (Peru) P Vásquez | 4 | 4
(United States) L Bonder (Peru) L Gildemeister | 6 | 6
(United States) C Benjamin (United States) A Moulton | 6 | 6
(West Germany) I Cueto (Switzerland) S Schmid | 1 | 2
(Japan) E Inoue (Japan) A Kijimuta | 6 | 6 | 5
8 | (United States) P Barg (United States) B Herr | 2 | 7 | 7

Second round
1 | (United States) E Burgin (United States) B Nagelsen | 6 | 6
(Australia) L Field (Australia) A Minter | 3 | 2
(Sweden) M Lindström (United States) P Smith | 4 | 4
(United States) A Henricksson (Switzerland) C Jolissaint | 6 | 6
4 | (Netherlands) M Mesker (France) P Paradis | 6 | 7
(United States) L Bonder (Peru) L Gildemeister | 2 | 5
(United States) C Benjamin (United States) A Moulton | 6 | 6 | 1
8 | (United States) P Barg (United States) B Herr | 3 | 7 | 6

Quarterfinals
1 | (United States) E Burgin (United States) B Nagelsen | 6 | 3 | 7
(United States) A Henricksson (Switzerland) C Jolissaint | 2 | 6 | 6
4 | (Netherlands) M Mesker (France) P Paradis | 4 | 6 | 7
8 | (United States) P Barg (United States) B Herr | 6 | 1 | 5

Semifinals
1 | (United States) E Burgin (United States) B Nagelsen | 6 | 7
4 | (Netherlands) M Mesker (France) P Paradis | 2 | 5

=== Bottom half ===
First round
6 | (Bulgaria) K Maleeva (Bulgaria) M Maleeva | 4 | 6 | 6
(United States) T Mochizuki (Japan) M Yanagi | 6 | 3 | 2
(Australia) J Byrne (Australia) J Thompson | 6 | 6
(France) I Demongeot (France) N Tauziat | 4 | 2
(West Germany) A Betzner (West Germany) C Singer | 5 | 7 | 2
(United States) MJ Fernández (United States) S Mascarin | 7 | 5 | 6
(Czechoslovakia) I Budařová (Sweden) C Lindqvist | 6 | 4 | 5
3 | (Soviet Union) S Parkhomenko (Soviet Union) L Savchenko | 3 | 6 | 7
7 | (France) C Suire (Argentina) A Villagrán | 5 | 6
(Italy) S Cecchini (Socialist Federal Republic of Yugoslavia) S Goleš | 7 | 7
(United States) K Horvath (Czechoslovakia) R Maršíková | 6 | 6
(Switzerland) E Krapl (Czechoslovakia) K Skronská | 3 | 2
(Argentina) M Paz (United Kingdom) V Wade | 7 | 6
(United States) B Gerken (United States) M Torres | 5 | 3
(South Africa) J Mundel (South Africa) Y Vermaak | 1 | 6
2 | (West Germany) B Bunge (West Germany) E Pfaff | 6 | 7

Second round
6 | (Bulgaria) K Maleeva (Bulgaria) M Maleeva | 6 | 5
(Australia) J Byrne (Australia) J Thompson | 7 | 7
(United States) MJ Fernández (United States) S Mascarin
3 | (Soviet Union) S Parkhomenko (Soviet Union) L Savchenko | w/o
(Italy) S Cecchini (Socialist Federal Republic of Yugoslavia) S Goleš | 6 | 7
(United States) K Horvath (Czechoslovakia) R Maršíková | 4 | 6
(Argentina) M Paz (United Kingdom) V Wade | 6 | 4
2 | (West Germany) B Bunge (West Germany) E Pfaff | 7 | 6

Quarterfinals
(Australia) J Byrne (Australia) J Thompson | 6 | 6
3 | (Soviet Union) S Parkhomenko (Soviet Union) L Savchenko | 3 | 4
(Italy) S Cecchini (Socialist Federal Republic of Yugoslavia) S Goleš | 6 | 5 | 4
2 | (West Germany) B Bunge (West Germany) E Pfaff | 2 | 7 | 6

Semifinals
(Australia) J Byrne (Australia) J Thompson | 2 | 7 | 6
2 | (West Germany) B Bunge (West Germany) E Pfaff | 6 | 6 | 2
