= 1990 Geneva European Open – Doubles =

Doubles
- 1990 Geneva European Open

Final
- Champions: (Australia) Louise Field (South Africa) Dianne Van Rensburg
- Runners-up: (United States) Elise Burgin (United States) Betsy Nagelsen
- Score: 5–7, 7–6^{(7–2)}, 7–5

Details
- Draw: 16
- Seeds: 4

Events
Singles	Doubles
← 1989 ·	WTA Swiss Open	· 1991 →

Katrina Adams and Lori McNeil were the defending champions, but none competed this year.

Louise Field and Dianne Van Rensburg won the title by defeating Elise Burgin and Betsy Nagelsen 5–7, 7–6^{(7–2)}, 7–5 in the final.

== Seeds ==
1. (United States) Elise Burgin / (United States) Betsy Nagelsen (final)
2. (Canada) Helen Kelesi / (United States) Kathy Rinaldi (quarterfinals)
3. (Australia) Louise Field / (South Africa) Dianne Van Rensburg (champion)
4. (Italy) Cathy Caverzasio / (Italy) Laura Garrone (quarterfinals)

== Draw ==
=== Key ===
- Q = Qualifier
- WC = Wild card
- LL = Lucky loser
- Alt = Alternate
- SE = Special exempt
- PR = Protected ranking
- ITF = ITF entry
- JE = Junior exempt
- w/o = Walkover
- r = Retired
- d = Defaulted
- SR = Special ranking

=== Draw ===
First round
1	(United States) E Burgin (United States) B Nagelsen	6	1	6
(United States) L Spadea (United States) T Whitlinger	4	6	3
(Brazil) A Vieira (Argentina) A Villagrán	6	5	6
(West Germany) S Hack (West Germany) C Schneider	3	7	7
4	(Italy) C Caverzasio (Italy) L Garrone	2	6	6
(Sweden) C Dahlman (Czechoslovakia) S Strnadová	6	1	4
(Austria) B Paulus (Czechoslovakia) R Zrubáková	3	5
(United States) T Phelps (United States) S Stafford	6	7
(Greece) A Kanellopoulou (Czechoslovakia) R Maršíková	6	6
(Switzerland) N Tschan (Switzerland) E Zardo	3	3
(Switzerland) Mareke Plocher (New Zealand) R Seeman	1	1
3	(Australia) L Field (South Africa) D Van Rensburg	6	6
(United Kingdom) S Smith (Netherlands) H ter Riet	2	6	6
(Switzerland) E Krapl (United States) M Werdel	6	3	0
(United States) B Bowes (United States) L Harvey Wild	4	2
2	(Canada) H Kelesi (United States) K Rinaldi	6	6

Quarterfinals
1	(United States) E Burgin (United States) B Nagelsen	6	6
(West Germany) S Hack (West Germany) C Schneider	2	2
4	(Italy) C Caverzasio (Italy) L Garrone	6	2	4
(United States) T Phelps (United States) S Stafford	3	6	6
(Greece) A Kanellopoulou (Czechoslovakia) R Maršíková	6	3
3	(Australia) L Field (South Africa) D Van Rensburg	7	6
(United Kingdom) S Smith (Netherlands) H ter Riet	6	7
2	(Canada) H Kelesi (United States) K Rinaldi	3	6

Semifinals
1	(United States) E Burgin (United States) B Nagelsen	6	6
(United States) T Phelps (United States) S Stafford	1	3
3	(Australia) L Field (South Africa) D Van Rensburg	7	6
(United Kingdom) S Smith (Netherlands) H ter Riet	5	2

Final
1	(United States) E Burgin (United States) B Nagelsen	7	6^{2}	5
3	(Australia) L Field (South Africa) D Van Rensburg	5	7^{7}	7
