= 1988 European Open – Singles =

Singles
- 1988 European Open
- 1987 Champion: (United States) Chris Evert-Lloyd

Final
- Champion: (Austria) Barbara Paulus
- Runner-up: (United States) Lori McNeil
- Score: 6–4, 5–7, 6–1

Details
- Draw: 32
- Seeds: 8

Events
Singles	Doubles
← 1987 ·	European Open	· 1989 →

Chris Evert was the defending champion but did not compete that year.

Barbara Paulus won in the final 6–4, 5–7, 6–1 against Lori McNeil.

== Seeds ==
A champion seed is indicated in bold text while text in italics indicates the round in which that seed was eliminated.

1. (Bulgaria) Manuela Maleeva-Fragnière (quarterfinals)
2. (United States) Lori McNeil (final)
3. (United States) Mary Joe Fernández (second round)
4. (France) Nathalie Tauziat (first round)
5. (Sweden) Catarina Lindqvist (quarterfinals)
6. (Argentina) Patricia Tarabini (first round)
7. (Brazil) Neige Dias (second round)
8. (Netherlands) Brenda Schultz (second round)

== Draw ==
=== Key ===
- Q = Qualifier
- WC = Wild card
- LL = Lucky loser
- Alt = Alternate
- SE = Special exempt
- PR = Protected ranking
- ITF = ITF entry
- JE = Junior exempt
- w/o = Walkover
- r = Retired
- d = Defaulted
- SR = Special ranking

First round
1	(Bulgaria) **M Maleeva-Fragnière**	**6**	**6**
(Switzerland) C Cohen	3	4
(Switzerland) E Krapl	6	3
Q	(Italy) **L Lapi**	**7**	**6**
(Italy) F Bonsignori	4	1
(South Africa) **D Van Rensburg**	**6**	**6**
(France) **I Demongeot**	**7**	**6**
6	(Argentina) P Tarabini	6	4
4	(France) N Tauziat	5	4
(Brazil) **G Miró**	**7**	**6**
(Czechoslovakia) **I Budařová**	**6**	**7**
(Belgium) S Wasserman	1	5
(Austria) **B Paulus**	**6**	**6**
(South Africa) K Schimper	2	3
Q	(Brazil) A Vieira	3	2
7	(Brazil) **N Dias**	**6**	**6**
5	(Sweden) **C Lindqvist**	**7**	**6**
(Italy) L Golarsa	5	1
(Argentina) **A Villagrán**	**6**	**6**
(Belgium) A Devries	4	4
(Argentina) **M Pérez-Roldán**	5	**6**	**6**
Q	(Switzerland) S Jaquet	**7**	4	4
(Sweden) M Lindström	3	3
3	(United States) **M J Fernández**	**6**	**6**
8	(Netherlands) **B Schultz**	**6**	**6**
(West Germany) C Porwik	2	1
(Argentina) **M Paz**	**6**	**6**
(Spain) C Martínez	4	1
Q	(Greece) A Kanellopoulou	5	6
(Italy) **L Ferrando**	**7**	**7**
(Netherlands) H Witvoet	3	3
2	(United States) **L McNeil**	**6**	**6**

Second round
1	(Bulgaria) **M Maleeva-Fragnière**	**6**	**6**
Q	(Italy) L Lapi	3	1
(South Africa) D Van Rensburg	3	2
(France) **I Demongeot**	**6**	**6**
(Brazil) G Miró	5	3
(Czechoslovakia) **I Budařová**	**7**	**6**
(Austria) **B Paulus**	**6**	**6**
7	(Brazil) N Dias	1	2
5	(Sweden) **C Lindqvist**	**6**	**7**
(Argentina) A Villagrán	1	6
(Argentina) **M Pérez-Roldán**	**6**
3	(United States) M J Fernández	6	r
8	(Netherlands) B Schultz	4	**7**	3
(Argentina) **M Paz**	**6**	5	**6**
(Italy) L Ferrando	4	**7**	4
2	(United States) **L McNeil**	**6**	5	**6**

Quarterfinals
1	(Bulgaria) M Maleeva-Fragnière	5	4
(France) **I Demongeot**	**7**	**6**
(Czechoslovakia) I Budařová	2	2
(Austria) **B Paulus**	**6**	**6**
5	(Sweden) C Lindqvist	2	**6**	2
(Argentina) **M Pérez-Roldán**	**6**	0	**6**
(Argentina) M Paz	6	3
2	(United States) **L McNeil**	**7**	**6**

Semifinals
(France) I Demongeot	**6**	3	1
(Austria) **B Paulus**	4	**6**	**6**
(Argentina) M Pérez-Roldán	2	0	r
2	(United States) **L McNeil**	**6**	**3**

Final
(Austria) **Barbara Paulus**	**6**	5	**6**
2	(United States) Lori McNeil	4	**7**	1
