= 1990 Geneva European Open – Singles =

Singles
- 1990 Geneva European Open

Final
- Champion: (Austria) Barbara Paulus
- Runner-up: (Canada) Helen Kelesi
- Score: 2–6, 7–5, 7–6^{(7–3)}

Details
- Draw: 32 (4Q/1LL)
- Seeds: 8

Events
Singles	Doubles
← 1989 ·	WTA Swiss Open	· 1991 →

Manuela Maleeva-Fragnière was the defending champion, but lost in the second round to Sabine Hack.

Barbara Paulus won the title by defeating Helen Kelesi 2–6, 7–5, 7–6^{(7–3)} in the final.

== Seeds ==
1. (Switzerland) Manuela Maleeva-Fragnière (second round)
2. (Austria) Barbara Paulus (champion)
3. (Canada) Helen Kelesi (final)
4. (Australia) Hana Mandlíková (first round, retired)
5. (South Africa) Dianne Van Rensburg (second round)
6. (n/a)
7. (Czechoslovakia) Radka Zrubáková (first round)
8. (Italy) Cathy Caverzasio (quarterfinals)

== Draw ==
=== Key ===
- Q = Qualifier
- WC = Wild card
- LL = Lucky loser
- Alt = Alternate
- SE = Special exempt
- PR = Protected ranking
- ITF = ITF entry
- JE = Junior exempt
- w/o = Walkover
- r = Retired
- d = Defaulted
- SR = Special ranking

=== Finals ===
Semifinals
(West Germany) Sabine Hack	2	1
3	(Canada) Helen Kelesi	6	6
Q	(Switzerland) Emanuela Zardo	5	3
2	(Austria) Barbara Paulus	7	6

Final
3	(Canada) Helen Kelesi	6	5	6^{3}
2	(Austria) Barbara Paulus	2	7	7^{7}

=== Top half ===
First round
1	(Switzerland) M Maleeva-Fragnière	6	6
(Italy) L Lapi	1	3
(Australia) L Field	3	3
(West Germany) S Hack	6	6
(United States) S Stafford	6	6
(Australia) J Byrne	3	1
(United States) S Martin	6	6	6
(United States) B Nagelsen	1	7	1
3	(Canada) H Kelesi	6	5	6
(Switzerland) C Cohen	3	7	4
(United States) L Harvey Wild	7	4	6
(United States) T Whitlinger	5	6	3
(Greece) A Kanellopoulou	6	3	6
Q	(United States) B Herr	3	6	0
(United States) E Burgin	3	2
8	(Italy) C Caverzasio	6	6

Second round
1	(Switzerland) M Maleeva-Fragnière	2	1
(West Germany) S Hack	6	6
(United States) S Stafford	6	7
(United States) S Martin	4	5
3	(Canada) H Kelesi	6	6
(United States) L Harvey Wild	1	4
(Greece) A Kanellopoulou	1	5
8	(Italy) C Caverzasio	6	7

Quarterfinals
(West Germany) S Hack	6	6
(United States) S Stafford	1	0
3	(Canada) H Kelesi	3	6	6
8	(Italy) C Caverzasio	6	1	1

Semifinals
(West Germany) S Hack	2	1
3	(Canada) H Kelesi	6	6

=== Bottom half ===
First round
5	(South Africa) D Van Rensburg	7	6
LL	(United Kingdom) S Smith	5	2
Q	(Switzerland) E Krapl	1	3
Q	(Switzerland) E Zardo	6	6
(United States) B Bowes	6	4	6
(Sweden) C Dahlman	1	6	3
(Italy) L Garrone	2
4	(Australia) H Mandlíková	0	r
7	(Czechoslovakia) R Zrubáková	4	4
Q	(Netherlands) H ter Riet	6	6
(United States) K Rinaldi	1	0
(South Africa) A Coetzer	6	6
(United States) M Werdel	7	6
(Brazil) A Vieira	5	3
(Argentina) G Castro	3	1
2	(Austria) B Paulus	6	6

Second round
5	(South Africa) D Van Rensburg	5	7	1
Q	(Switzerland) E Zardo	7	6	6
(United States) B Bowes	6	3	1
(Italy) L Garrone	4	6	6
Q	(Netherlands) H ter Riet	6	4	2
(South Africa) A Coetzer	1	6	6
(United States) M Werdel	2	3
2	(Austria) B Paulus	6	6

Quarterfinals
Q	(Switzerland) E Zardo	4	6	6
(Italy) L Garrone	6	4	2
(South Africa) A Coetzer	2	2
2	(Austria) B Paulus	6	6

Semifinals
Q	(Switzerland) E Zardo	5	3
2	(Austria) B Paulus	7	6
