= 1988 WTA Nice Open – Doubles =

Doubles
- 1988 WTA Nice Open

Final
- Champions: (France) Catherine Suire (France) Catherine Tanvier
- Runners-up: (France) Isabelle Demongeot (France) Nathalie Tauziat
- Score: 6–4, 4–6, 6–2

Events
Singles	Doubles
← 1987 ·	WTA Nice Open	· 1989 →

Catherine Suire and Catherine Tanvier won in the final 6–4, 4–6, 6–2 against Isabelle Demongeot and Nathalie Tauziat.

== Seeds ==
Champion seeds are indicated in bold text while text in italics indicates the round in which those seeds were eliminated.

1. (France) **Catherine Suire** / (France) **Catherine Tanvier (champions)**
2. (France) Isabelle Demongeot / (France) Nathalie Tauziat (final)
3. (France) Nathalie Herreman / (France) Pascale Paradis (semifinals)
4. (Socialist Federal Republic of Yugoslavia) Sabrina Goleš / (Argentina) Patricia Tarabini (semifinals)

== Draw ==
=== Key ===
- Q = Qualifier
- WC = Wild card
- LL = Lucky loser
- Alt = Alternate
- SE = Special exempt
- PR = Protected ranking
- ITF = ITF entry
- JE = Junior exempt
- w/o = Walkover
- r = Retired
- d = Defaulted
- SR = Special ranking

First round
1	(France) **C Suire** (France) **C Tanvier**	**6**	**6**
(Italy) S Cecchini (Argentina) A Villagrán	3	4
(Argentina) **B Fulco** (Austria) **J Wiesner**	**6**	2	**7**
(Poland) I Kuczyńska (Italy) S Simmonds	3	**6**	6
3	(France) **N Herreman** (France) **P Paradis**	2	**6**	**6**
(France) F Martin (France) V Paquet	**6**	2	4
(Spain) C Martínez (Austria) B Paulus	3	4
(France) **A Dechaume** (France) **E Derly**	**6**	**6**
(Switzerland) **S Jaquet** (Switzerland) **M Strebel**	**6**	**6**
(Netherlands) I Driehuis (Argentina) G Mosca	2	3
(West Germany) S Frankl (United States) M Torres	0	0
4	(Socialist Federal Republic of Yugoslavia) **S Goleš** (Argentina) **P Tarabini**	**6**	**6**
(Italy) **L Ferrando** (Italy) **L Garrone**	**6**	**6**
(Italy) F Bonsignori (Netherlands) H ter Riet	0	1
(France) M-C Calleja (United States) E Galphin	0	2
2	(France) **I Demongeot** (France) **N Tauziat**	**6**	**6**

Quarterfinals
1	(France) **C Suire** (France) **C Tanvier**	4	**6**	**6**
(Argentina) B Fulco (Austria) J Wiesner	**6**	0	3
3	(France) **N Herreman** (France) **P Paradis**	**6**	**6**
(France) A Dechaume (France) E Derly	2	4
(Switzerland) S Jaquet (Switzerland) M Strebel	**6**	6	3
4	(Socialist Federal Republic of Yugoslavia) **S Goleš** (Argentina) **P Tarabini**	3	**7**	**6**
(Italy) L Ferrando (Italy) L Garrone	**6**	3	3
2	(France) **I Demongeot** (France) **N Tauziat**	4	**6**	**6**

Semifinals
1	(France) **C Suire** (France) **C Tanvier**	**w/o**
3	(France) N Herreman (France) P Paradis
4	(Socialist Federal Republic of Yugoslavia) S Goleš (Argentina) P Tarabini	4	6
2	(France) **I Demongeot** (France) **N Tauziat**	**6**	**7**

Final
1	(France) **Catherine Suire** (France) **Catherine Tanvier**	**6**	4	**6**
2	(France) Isabelle Demongeot (France) Nathalie Tauziat	4	**6**	2
