= 1986 European Open – Singles =

Singles
- 1986 European Open

Final
- Champion: (Italy) Raffaella Reggi
- Runner-up: (Bulgaria) Manuela Maleeva
- Score: 5–7, 6–3, 7–6^{(8–6)}

Details
- Draw: 56 (8Q)
- Seeds: 16

Events
| Singles | Doubles |
| ← 1985 · | WTA Swiss Open | · 1987 → |

Bonnie Gadusek was the defending champion, but did not compete this year.

Raffaella Reggi won the title by defeating Manuela Maleeva 5–7, 6–3, 7–6^{(8–6)} in the final.

== Seeds ==
The first eight seeds received a bye into the second round.

1. (Bulgaria) Manuela Maleeva (final)
2. (Argentina) Gabriela Sabatini (third round)
3. (Sweden) Catarina Lindqvist (second round)
4. (United States) Terry Phelps (quarterfinals)
5. (United States) Alycia Moulton (second round)
6. (West Germany) Bettina Bunge (semifinals)
7. (United States) Lisa Bonder (third round)
8. (Peru) Laura Gildemeister (third round)
9. (United States) Elise Burgin (third round)
10. (Germany) Sylvia Hanika (third round)
11. (United States) Susan Mascarin (second round)
12. (Bulgaria) Katerina Maleeva (second round)
13. (Canada) Helen Kelesi (quarterfinals)
14. (Italy) Raffaella Reggi (champion)
15. (n/a)
16. (n/a)

== Draw ==
=== Key ===
- Q = Qualifier
- WC = Wild card
- LL = Lucky loser
- Alt = Alternate
- SE = Special exempt
- PR = Protected ranking
- ITF = ITF entry
- JE = Junior exempt
- w/o = Walkover
- r = Retired
- d = Defaulted
- SR = Special ranking

=== Finals ===
Quarterfinals
1 | (Bulgaria) Manuela Maleeva | 7 | 6
(Greece) Angeliki Kanellopoulou | 5 | 1
13 | (Canada) Helen Kelesi | 5 | 3
(Socialist Federal Republic of Yugoslavia) Sabrina Goleš | 7 | 6
14 | (Italy) Raffaella Reggi | 5 | 6 | 6
4 | (United States) Terry Phelps | 7 | 2 | 0
6 | (West Germany) Bettina Bunge | 7 | 6
(United States) Mary Joe Fernández | 5 | 3

Semifinals
1 | (Bulgaria) Manuela Maleeva | 6 | 6
(Socialist Federal Republic of Yugoslavia) Sabrina Goleš | 2 | 3
14 | (Italy) Raffaella Reggi | 7 | 3 | 7
6 | (West Germany) Bettina Bunge | 5 | 6 | 6

Final
1 | (Bulgaria) Manuela Maleeva | 7 | 3 | 6
14 | (Italy) Raffaella Reggi | 5 | 6 | 7

=== Top half ===
==== Section 1 ====
First round
(Brazil) N Dias | 3 | 3
(Soviet Union) L Savchenko | 6 | 6
Q | (France) I Demongeot | 6 | 6
(Soviet Union) S Parkhomenko | 0 | 4
(France) C Tanvier | 2 | 4
10 | (West Germany) S Hanika | 6 | 6
(Italy) S Cecchini | 6 | 6
(Argentina) A Villagrán | 3 | 4
(West Germany) I Cueto | 6 | 6
(Czechoslovakia) K Skronská | 0 | 2
Q | (South Africa) Y Vermaak | 6 | 6 | 3
(Greece) A Kanellopoulou | 7 | 0 | 6

Second round
1 | (Bulgaria) M Maleeva | 6 | 6
(Soviet Union) L Savchenko | 1 | 3
Q | (France) I Demongeot | 3 | 4
10 | (West Germany) S Hanika | 6 | 6
(Italy) S Cecchini | 6 | 6
(West Germany) I Cueto | 4 | 2
(Greece) A Kanellopoulou | 6 | 6
5 | (United States) A Moulton | 4 | 3

Third round
1 | (Bulgaria) M Maleeva | 6 | 6
10 | (West Germany) S Hanika | 1 | 3
(Italy) S Cecchini | 4 | 2
(Greece) A Kanellopoulou | 6 | 6

Quarterfinals
1 | (Bulgaria) M Maleeva | 7 | 6
(Greece) A Kanellopoulou | 5 | 1

==== Section 2 ====
First round
(United States) V Nelson-Dunbar | 1 | 1
Q | (Argentina) M Paz | 6 | 6
(Switzerland) L Drescher | 6 | 7
(France) C Suire | 3 | 6
(Netherlands) M Mesker | 7 | 3 | 4
13 | (Canada) H Kelesi | 5 | 6 | 6
12 | (Bulgaria) K Maleeva | 6 | 6
(West Germany) A Betzner | 4 | 3
(Socialist Federal Republic of Yugoslavia) S Goleš | 6 | 6
(Argentina) I Madruga-Osses | 2 | 3
(Switzerland) C Jolissaint | 6 | 6 | 6
Q | (Australia) E Minter | 7 | 3 | 2

Second round
3 | (Sweden) C Lindqvist | 6 | 3 | 6
Q | (Argentina) M Paz | 3 | 6 | 7
(Switzerland) L Drescher | 7 | 6 | 1
13 | (Canada) H Kelesi | 6 | 7 | 6
12 | (Bulgaria) K Maleeva | 2 | 6 | 4
(Socialist Federal Republic of Yugoslavia) S Goleš | 6 | 3 | 6
(Switzerland) C Jolissaint | 5 | 2
8 | (Peru) L Gildemeister | 7 | 6

Third round
Q | (Argentina) M Paz | 4 | 4
13 | (Canada) H Kelesi | 6 | 6
(Socialist Federal Republic of Yugoslavia) S Goleš | 6 | 6
8 | (Peru) L Gildemeister | 2 | 2

Quarterfinals
13 | (Canada) H Kelesi | 5 | 3
(Socialist Federal Republic of Yugoslavia) S Goleš | 7 | 6

=== Bottom half ===
==== Section 3 ====
First round
(United States) B Gerken | 3 | 1
Q | (West Germany) S Meier | 6 | 6
Q | (Canada) J Young | 6 | 4 | 6
(France) P Paradis | 2 | 6 | 4
Q | (Sweden) M Lindström | 0 | 0
14 | (Italy) R Reggi | 6 | 6
9 | (United States) E Burgin | 4 | 6 | 6
(United States) B Herr | 6 | 4 | 3
(United States) T Mochizuki | 4 | 2
(United States) C Benjamin | 6 | 6
(Switzerland) S Schmid | 1 | 3
(Spain) A Sánchez Vicario | 6 | 6

Second round
7 | (United States) L Bonder | 6 | 6
Q | (West Germany) S Meier | 3 | 2
Q | (Canada) J Young | 4 | 1
14 | (Italy) R Reggi | 6 | 6
9 | (United States) E Burgin | 7 | 6
(United States) C Benjamin | 5 | 3
(Spain) A Sánchez Vicario | 1 | 0
4 | (United States) T Phelps | 6 | 6

Third round
7 | (United States) L Bonder | 6 | 2 | 2
14 | (Italy) R Reggi | 4 | 6 | 6
9 | (United States) E Burgin | 5 | 1
4 | (United States) T Phelps | 7 | 6

Quarterfinals
14 | (Italy) R Reggi | 5 | 6 | 6
4 | (United States) T Phelps | 7 | 2 | 0

==== Section 4 ====
First round
(United States) M Torres | 1 | 0
(United States) K Horvath | 6 | 6
(Japan) E Inoue | 6 | 6 | 5
(Brazil) P Medrado | 4 | 7 | 7
(West Germany) G Groell-Dinu | 5 | 2
Q | (France) N Tauziat | 7 | 6
11 | (United States) S Mascarin | 6 | 6
(Australia) A Tobin-Dingwall | 4 | 1
(Austria) P Huber | 1 | 3
(United States) MJ Fernández | 6 | 6
(Australia) J Tremelling | 1 | 6 | 5
(Czechoslovakia) R Maršíková | 6 | 4 | 7

Second round
6 | (West Germany) B Bunge | 7 | 6
(United States) K Horvath | 5 | 3
(Brazil) P Medrado | 5 | 6 | 6
Q | (France) N Tauziat | 7 | 3 | 1
11 | (United States) S Mascarin | 2 | 1
(United States) MJ Fernández | 6 | 6
(Czechoslovakia) R Maršíková | 4 | 6 | 5
2 | (Argentina) G Sabatini | 6 | 4 | 7

Third round
6 | (West Germany) B Bunge | 3 | 6 | 7
(Brazil) P Medrado | 6 | 1 | 5
(United States) MJ Fernández | 3 | 6 | 7
2 | (Argentina) G Sabatini | 6 | 2 | 5

Quarterfinals
6 | (West Germany) B Bunge | 7 | 6
(United States) MJ Fernández | 5 | 3
