= 1988 WTA Nice Open =

- Date: 11–17 July
- Edition: 1st
- Category: Tier V
- Draw: 32S / 16D
- Prize money: $100,000
- Surface: Clay / outdoors
- Location: Nice, France
- Venue: Nice Lawn Tennis Club

Champions

Singles
- (Italy) Sandra Cecchini

Doubles
- (France) Catherine Suire / (France) Catherine Tanvier
WTA Nice Open

The 1988 WTA Nice Open was a women's tennis tournament played on outdoor clay courts at the Nice Lawn Tennis Club, in Nice, France and was part of Tier V of the 1988 WTA Tour. The tournament ran from 11 July until 17 July 1988. First-seeded Sandra Cecchini won the singles title.

== Finals ==
=== Singles ===
(Italy) Sandra Cecchini defeated (France) Nathalie Tauziat 7–5, 6–4

- It was Cecchini's 3rd title of the year and the 10th of her career.

=== Doubles ===
(France) Catherine Suire / (France) Catherine Tanvier defeated (France) Isabelle Demongeot / (France) Nathalie Tauziat 6–4, 4–6, 6–2

- It was Suire's 3rd title of the year and the 6th of her career. It was Tanvier's 1st title of the year and the 5th of her career.
