= 1988 European Open – Doubles =

Doubles
- 1988 European Open
- 1987 Champions: (United States) Betsy Nagelsen (Australia) Elizabeth Smylie

Final
- Champions: (Switzerland) Christiane Jolissaint (South Africa) Dianne Van Rensburg
- Runners-up: (Sweden) Maria Lindström (West Germany) Claudia Porwik
- Score: 6–1, 6–3

Events
Singles	Doubles
← 1987 ·	European Open	· 1989 →

Betsy Nagelsen and Elizabeth Smylie were the defending champions but did not compete that year.

Christiane Jolissaint and Dianne Van Rensburg won in the final 6–1, 6–3 against Maria Lindström and Claudia Porwik.

== Seeds ==
Champion seeds are indicated in bold text while text in italics indicates the round in which those seeds were eliminated.

1. (United States) Lori McNeil / (Argentina) Mercedes Paz (quarterfinals)
2. (France) Isabelle Demongeot / (France) Nathalie Tauziat (semifinals)
3. (Switzerland) **Christiane Jolissaint** / (South Africa) **Dianne Van Rensburg (champions)**
4. (United States) Mary Joe Fernández / (Sweden) Catarina Lindqvist (quarterfinals)

== Draw ==
=== Key ===
- Q = Qualifier
- WC = Wild card
- LL = Lucky loser
- Alt = Alternate
- SE = Special exempt
- PR = Protected ranking
- ITF = ITF entry
- JE = Junior exempt
- w/o = Walkover
- r = Retired
- d = Defaulted
- SR = Special ranking

First round

Quarterfinals

Semifinals

Final

1
- (United States) **L McNeil**
- (Argentina) **M Paz**
**6**
**6**

- (Italy) L Ferrando
- (Italy) L Golarsa
3
3

1
- (United States) L McNeil
- (Argentina) M Paz
5
4

- (Czechoslovakia) **I Budařová**
- (Netherlands) **B Schultz**
**6**
**6**

- (Czechoslovakia) **I Budařová**
- (Netherlands) **B Schultz**
**7**
**6**

- (Switzerland) E Krapl
- (Belgium) S Wasserman
3
4

- (Czechoslovakia) I Budařová
- (Netherlands) B Schultz
5
5

4
- (United States) **M J Fernández**
- (Sweden) **C Lindqvist**
**6**
4
**6**

- (Sweden) **M Lindström**
- (West Germany) **C Porwik**
**7**
**7**

- (Brazil) P Medrado
- (Argentina) A Villagrán
2
**6**
1

4
- (United States) M J Fernández
- (Sweden) C Lindqvist

- (Sweden) **M Lindström**
- (West Germany) **C Porwik**
**6**
**6**

- (Sweden) **M Lindström**
- (West Germany) **C Porwik**
**w/o**

- (Switzerland) C Cohen
- (Argentina) M Pérez-Roldán
4
1

- (Sweden) Maria Lindström
- (West Germany) Claudia Porwik
1
3

- (Brazil) **G Miró**
- (United States) **L Spadea**
**6**
1
**6**

3
- (Switzerland) **Christiane Jolissaint**
- (South Africa) **Dianne Van Rensburg**
**6**
**6**

- (Japan) E Iida
- (Japan) M Yanagi
0
**6**
2

- (Brazil) G Miró
- (United States) L Spadea
1
**6**
2

- (Belgium) A Devries
- (South Africa) K Schimper
4
1

3
- (Switzerland) **C Jolissaint**
- (South Africa) **D Van Rensburg**
**6**
3
**6**

3
- (Switzerland) **C Jolissaint**
- (South Africa) **D Van Rensburg**
**6**
**6**

3
- (Switzerland) **C Jolissaint**
- (South Africa) **D Van Rensburg**
6
**7**
**7**

- (Luxembourg) K Kschwendt
- (Spain) C Martínez
1
2

2
- (France) I Demongeot
- (France) N Tauziat
**7**
5
5

- (Brazil) **N Dias**
- (Argentina) **P Tarabini**
**6**
**6**

- (Brazil) N Dias
- (Argentina) P Tarabini
3
2

- (Australia) L Field
- (Netherlands) H Witvoet
**6**
4
4

2
- (France) **I Demongeot**
- (France) **N Tauziat**
**6**
**6**

2
- (France) **I Demongeot**
- (France) **N Tauziat**
3
**6**
**6**
