= 1983 Freiburg Open =

- Date: 11–17 July
- Edition: Only
- Prize money: $50,000
- Surface: Clay / outdoor
- Location: Freiburg, West Germany

Champions

Singles
- (France) Catherine Tanvier

Doubles
- (West Germany) Bettina Bunge / (West Germany) Eva Pfaff
Freiburg Open

The 1983 Freiburg Open was a women's tennis tournament played on outdoor clay courts in Freiburg, West Germany that was part of the 1983 Virginia Slims World Championship Series. It was the only edition of the tournament and was held from 11 July through 17 July 1983. Second-seeded Catherine Tanvier won the singles title.

== Finals ==
=== Singles ===
(France) Catherine Tanvier defeated (United States) Laura Gildemeister 6–4, 7–5

- It was Tanvier's only WTA singles title of her career.

=== Doubles ===
(West Germany) Bettina Bunge / (West Germany) Eva Pfaff defeated (Argentina) Ivanna Madruga-Osses / (Argentina) Emilse Raponi 6–1, 6–2

- It was Bunge's 2nd and last WTA doubles title of the year and the 2nd of her career. It was Pfaff's 2nd and last WTA doubles title of the year and the 4th of her career.
