= 1988 European Open =

- Date: 16–22 May
- Edition: 12th
- Category: 2
- Draw: 32S / 16D
- Prize money: $100,000
- Surface: Clay / outdoor
- Location: Geneva, Switzerland
- Venue: Drizia-Miremont Tennis Club

Champions

Singles
- (Austria) Barbara Paulus

Doubles
- (Switzerland) Christiane Jolissaint / (South Africa) Dianne van Rensburg
← 1987 ·	WTA Swiss Open	· 1989 →

The 1988 European Open was a women's tennis tournament played on outdoor clay courts at the Drizia-Miremont Tennis Club in Geneva in Switzerland and was part of the Category 2 of the 1988 WTA Tour. The tournament ran from 16 May until 22 May 1988. Barbara Paulus won the singles title.

== Finals ==
=== Singles ===
(Austria) Barbara Paulus defeated (United States) Lori McNeil 6–4, 5–7, 6–1

- It was Paulus' 1st title of the year and the 1st of her career.

=== Doubles ===
(Switzerland) Christiane Jolissaint / (South Africa) Dianne van Rensburg defeated (Sweden) Maria Lindström / (West Germany) Claudia Porwik 6–1, 6–3

- It was Jolissaint's 2nd title of the year and the 5th of her career. It was van Rensburg's only title of the year and the 2nd of her career.
