= Katarzyna Nowak =

Polish tennis player

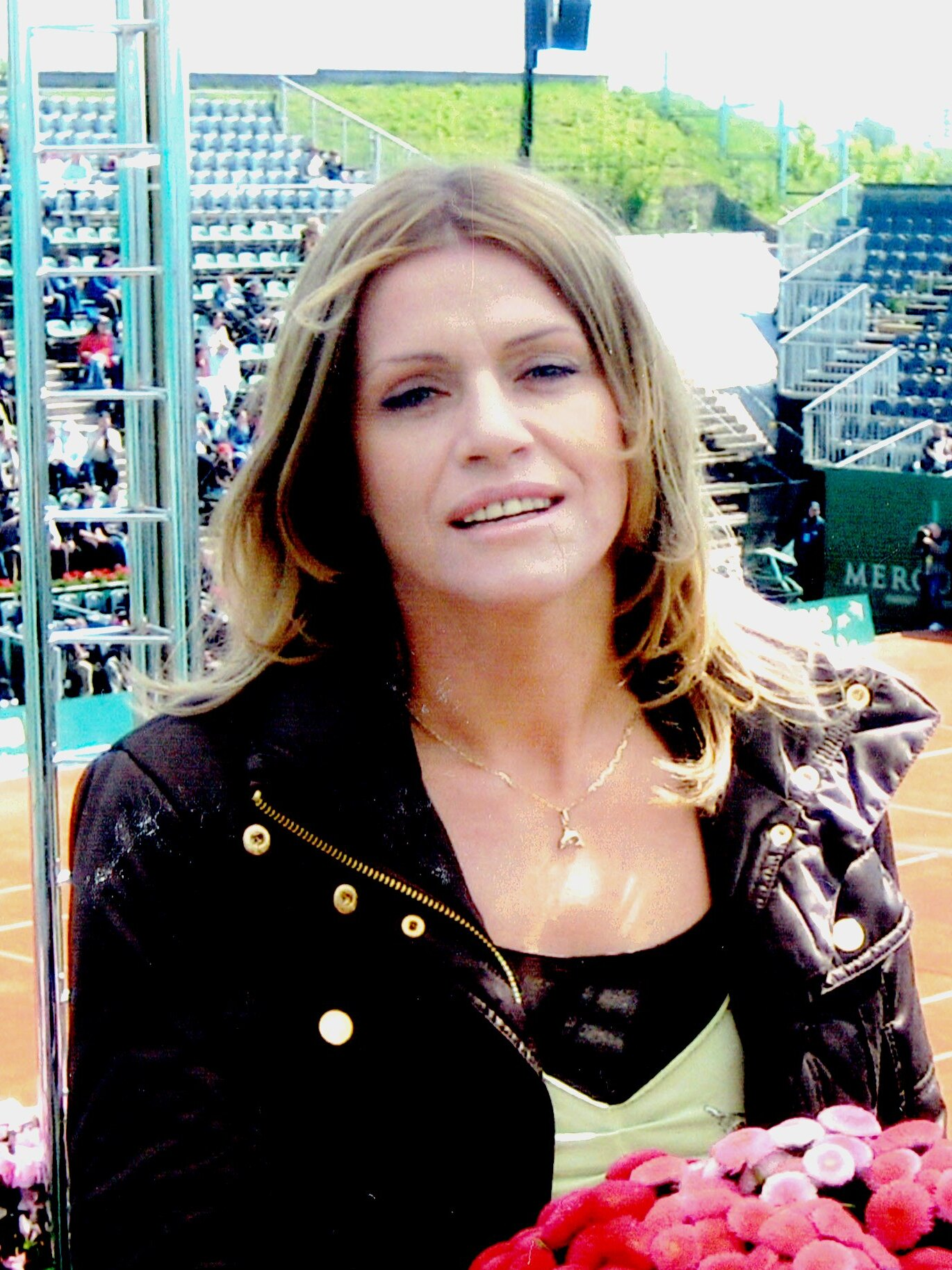
- Country (sports): Poland
- Born: 13 January 1969 (age 57) Łódź, Poland
- Height: 1.73 m (5 ft 8 in)
- Prize money: $292,033

Singles
- Career record: 203–178
- Career titles: 6 ITF
- Highest ranking: No. 47 (11 September 1995)

Grand Slam singles results
- Australian Open: 1R (1993, 1996)
- French Open: 3R (1995)
- Wimbledon: 2R (1992)
- US Open: 1R (1991, 1992, 1995)

Doubles
- Career record: 24–42
- Career titles: 0
- Highest ranking: No. 225 (14 August 1989)

Team competitions
- Fed Cup: 10–11

Katarzyna Nowak (born 13 January 1969) is a former Polish professional tennis player.

She is the first Polish female tennis player in Open Era to reach the Top 50 on the WTA ranking. Her highest career singles ranking is world No. 47, which she achieved in September 1995. She is also the first Polish female tennis player, who represented her country at the Olympics (1992 Barcelona Olympics).

== Early life and tennis career ==
She began playing at the times of the hard rules of the communist period in Poland: tennis was considered by the authorities as a sport reserved for the elite and was not profitable because it was not among the Olympic sports then.

Poland was facing economic catastrophe until the fall of Communism.

Katarzyna Nowak graduated from University of Łódź.

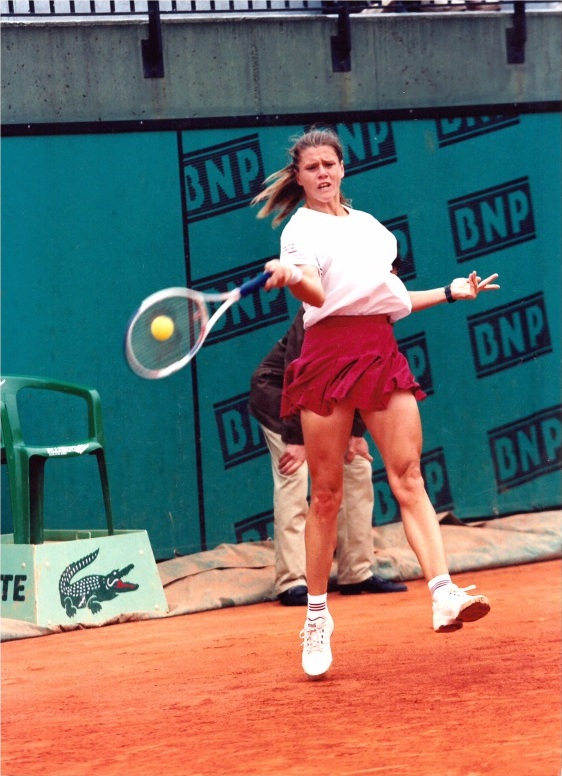
Katarzyna Nowak

=== WTA tour ===
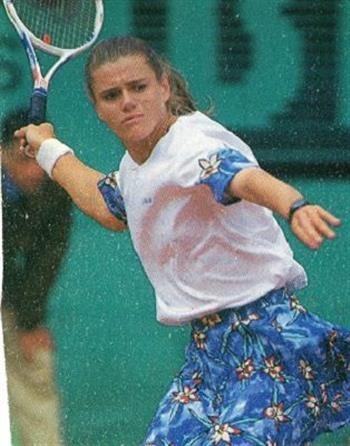
Katarzyna Nowak

She qualified for two semi-finals of WTA World Tour:

- Cesena Ladies Championships in 1992 and Ford International Championships of Spain in Barcelona in 1995.
- On the road to the semi-final in Cesena, she defeated Sandrine Testud, Claudia Porwik and Nathalie Herreman, losing to Mary Pierce in her fight for the final.
- In Barcelona she defeated Sandrine Testud, Julie Halard and Ruxandra Dragomir losing in semi-finals to Iva Majoli, 1997 French Open champion.

She advanced twice to quarterfinals of WTA World Tour:

- Belgian Open in Liege in 1993 where she defeated Laurence Courtois and Petra Langrova.
- Amelia Island in 1995 where she won against Silke Meier, Judith Wiesner and Meike Babel.

=== Grand Slam tournaments results ===
She began competing in the Grand Slams in 1990. After winning three rounds of qualifications at French Open, she qualified to the second round in 1994 – losing to Lindsay Davenport, future world number 1. She qualified and advanced to the third round in 1995 – losing to Kimiko Date, number 4 at the WTA.

Nowak also reached the second round of Wimbledon in 1992.

=== ITF tour ===
She also won six ITF titles and was runner-up at five ITF tournaments.

=== Billie Jean King Cup ===
In the years 1988-1995, she was the leader of the Polish Billie Jean King Cup’s Team in: Melbourne (1988), Tokyo (1989), Atlanta (1990), Nottingham (1991), Frankfurt (1992-1994) and Barcelona (1995).

She played her first match for the Polish team in 1988 in Melbourne where Italy dominated Poland 2-1. Nowak beat Laura Garrone to score her team’s only point.

In 1991, the Polish team defeated six seeded France, with Katarzyna Nowak beating Nathalie Tauziat, a future Wimbledon runner-up. One year later in Frankfurt: Katarzyna Nowak, Magdalena Mróz and Katarzyna Teodorowicz advanced to the Fed Cup quarter-finals for the first time in history, winning against Sweden and Israel.

As the number 1 player in her team, Katarzyna Nowak defeated Catarina Lindqvist and Anna Smashnova. This success was only repeated by one other Polish team in 2015. Nowak won a total of 9 singles matches in the Fed Cup.

=== Achievements ===
She won 7 Polish championship titles in senior and was nominated the best Polish tennis player in years 1988, 1990, 1991, 1992, 1994, 1995.

=== Retirement ===
She retired from the professional tour in 1998 due to back pain.

== After tennis career ==
=== Media ===
Nowak has been a tennis commentator and expert on the Polsat Sport Television from 2004 to 2022, commentating on tennis tournaments such as Wimbledon, Miami Open, Indian Wells, Rolex Monte Carlo, Internacjonale di Italia Rome, French Open, Rolex Szanghaj, and the Cincinnati Open.

Nowak has provided detailed commentary and opinions for media outlets such as Przegląd Sportowy, Polish Radio, Tennis Magazyn, Wprost, PAP, Onet.pl, and others.

=== Awards and distinctions ===
In 2021, for the 100th anniversary of the Polish Tennis Federation, she was awarded an Order of Rebirth of Poland for her outstanding sport achievements in such a difficult period, her pioneer role and civic action for the development and promotion of sport.

In 2022, she was awarded the Gold badge of honor of the Polish Tennis Federation.

In 2025 during Billie Jean King Cup in Gorzów Wielkopolski Katarzyna was honourd by president of Polish Tennis Federation a special statuette for services to the Polish national team and to the development and popularization of tennis in Poland.

In 2015, she received an award for her extreme commitment and for contributing to Polsat Sport 1 as the best sports channel in Poland.

== ITF finals ==
Legend
$100,000 tournaments
$75,000 tournaments
$50,000 tournaments
$25,000 tournaments
$10,000 tournaments

=== Singles (6–5) ===
Result	No.	Date	Tournament	Surface	Opponent	Score
Win	1.	11 July 1988	ITF Sezze, Italy	Clay	(Italy) Katia Piccolini	6–4, 2–6, 6–4
Loss	2.	30 October 1988	ITF Baden, Switzerland	Hard (i)	(Bulgaria) Elena Pampoulova	1–6, 1–6
Win	3.	23 April 1990	ITF Caserta, Italy	Clay	(Soviet Union) Elena Brioukhovets	1–6, 6–2, 6–3
Loss	4.	5 November 1990	ITF Eastbourne, England	Hard (i)	(France) Sandrine Testud	6–2, 3–6, 4–6
Loss	5.	12 August 1991	ITF Pisticci, Italy	Hard	(Italy) Nathalie Baudone	0–6, 1–6
Win	6.	12 December 1994	ITF Cergy, France	Hard (i)	(France) Isabelle Demongeot	6–3, 6–3
Loss	7.	14 September 1997	ITF Kyiv, Ukraine	Clay	(Hungary) Anna Földényi	2–6, 0–3 ret.
Win	8.	26 October 1997	ITF Joué-lès-Tours, France	Hard (i)	(Hungary) Katalin Miskolczi	6–1, 6–2
Loss	9.	16 November 1997	ITF Le Havre, France	Clay (i)	(Austria) Melanie Schnell	2–6, 5–7
Win	10.	17 May 1998	ITF Le Touquet, France	Clay	(Netherlands) Maaike Koutstaal	7–6, 6–2
Win	11.	18 October 1998	ITF Saint-Raphaël, France	Hard (i)	(Germany) Magdalena Kučerová	6–1, 7–6

=== Doubles (0–3) ===
Result	Date	Tournament	Surface	Partner	Opponents	Score
Loss	18 July 1988	ITF Cava de' Tirreni, Italy	Clay	(West Germany) Christiane Hofmann	(Hungary) Virág Csurgó (Hungary) Réka Szikszay	1–6, 1–6
Loss	24 October 1988	Linz Open, Austria	Hard (i)	(Switzerland) Cristina Casini	(Austria) Marion Maruska (Austria) Petra Ritter	3–6, 4–6
Loss	30 October 1988	ITF Baden, Switzerland	Hard (i)	(Finland) Petra Thorén	(Australia) Kate McDonald (Australia) Rennae Stubbs	2–6, 0–6

== Federation Cup journey ==
#	Date	Place	Surface	Gagnante(s)	Perdante(s)	Score
1988 - 1st tour (groupe mondial) - Italie - Poland - 2 : 1
1	05/12/1988	(Australia) Melbourne		(Poland) Katarzyna Nowak	(Italy) Laura Garrone	0-6, 6-4, 6-3
1	05/12/1988	(Australia) Melbourne		(Italy) Cathy Caverzasio (Italy) Laura Garrone	(Poland) Katarzyna Nowak (Poland) Ewa Zerdecka	2-6, 7-6^{3}, 6-2
1989 - 1^{er} tour qualifications (groupe mondial) - Singapore - Poland - 0 : 3
2	01/10/1989	(Japan) Tokyo	Dur (ext.)	(Poland) Katarzyna Nowak	(Singapore) Lela Zainal	6-2, 6-4
1989 - 1^{er} tour (groupe mondial) - Poland - Danemark - 0 : 3
3	03/10/1989	(Japan) Tokyo	Dur (ext.)	(Denmark) Tine Scheuer-Larsen	(Poland) Katarzyna Nowak||6-0, 6-2	
1990 - 1^{er} tour qualifications (groupe mondial) - Poland - Uruguay - 2 : 1
4	21/07/1990	(United States) Atlanta	Dur (ext.)	(Uruguay) Patricia Miller	(Poland) Katarzyna Nowak	2-6, 6-4, 2, ab.-0
1990 - 1^{er} tour (groupe mondial) - États-Unis - Poland - 3 : 0
5	23/07/1990	(United States) Atlanta	Dur (ext.)	(United States) Zina Garrison	(Poland) Katarzyna Nowak	6-0, 6-1
1991 - 1^{er} tour qualifications (groupe mondial) - Poland - Kenya - 3 : 0
6	19/07/1991	(United Kingdom) Nottingham		(Poland) Katarzyna Nowak	(Kenya) Anita Aggarwal	6-0, 6-0
1991 - 2^{e} tour qualifications (groupe mondial) - Poland - Uruguay - 3 : 0
7	21/07/1991	(United Kingdom) Nottingham		(Poland) Katarzyna Nowak	(Uruguay) Patricia Miller	6-0, 6-0
1991 - 1^{er} tour (groupe mondial) - Poland - France - 2 : 1
8	22/07/1991	(United Kingdom) Nottingham		(Poland) Katarzyna Nowak	(France) Nathalie Tauziat	4-6, 6-4, 6-4
1991 - 2^{e} tour (groupe mondial) - Indonésie - Poland - 2 : 1
9	24/07/1991	(United Kingdom) Nottingham		(Indonesia) Yayuk Basuki	(Poland) Katarzyna Nowak	6-1, 6-1
1992 - 1^{er} tour (groupe mondial) - Poland - Israël - 3 : 0
10	13/07/1992	(Germany) Frankfurt	Terre (ext.)	(Poland) Katarzyna Nowak	(Israel) Anna Smashnova	6-2, 6-7^{7}, 6-1
1992 - 2^{e} tour (groupe mondial) - Poland - Suède - 2 : 1
11	15/07/1992	(Germany) Frankfurt	Terre (ext.)	(Poland) Katarzyna Nowak	(Sweden) Catarina Lindqvist	7-6^{4}, 6-7^{4}, 6-3
1992 - 1/4 de finale (groupe mondial) - Allemagne - Poland - 3 : 0
12	16/07/1992	(Germany) Frankfurt	Terre (ext.)	(Germany) Steffi Graf	(Poland) Katarzyna Nowak	6-0, 6-0
1993 - 1^{er} tour (groupe mondial) - Poland - Indonésie - 1 : 2
13	19/07/1993	(Germany) Frankfurt	Terre (ext.)	(Poland) Katarzyna Nowak	(Indonesia) Yayuk Basuki	6-3, 2-6, 6-3
1993 - Barrage (groupe mondial I) - Great-Britain - Poland - 1 : 2
14	22/07/1993	(Germany) Frankfurt	Terre (ext.)	(United Kingdom) Clare Wood	(Poland) Katarzyna Nowak	4-0, ab.
1994 - 1^{er} tour (groupe mondial) - Autriche - Poland - 2 : 1
15	19/07/1994	(Germany) Frankfurt	Terre (ext.)	(Austria) Judith Wiesner	(Poland) Katarzyna Nowak	6-3, 7-5
