= 1986 European Open =

- Date: 19–25 May
- Edition: 10th
- Draw: 56S / 32D
- Prize money: $100,000
- Surface: Clay / outdoor
- Location: Lugano, Switzerland

Champions

Singles
- (Italy) Raffaella Reggi

Doubles
- (United States) Elise Burgin (United States) Betsy Nagelsen
← 1985 ·	WTA Swiss Open	· 1987 →

The 1986 European Open was a women's tennis tournament played on outdoor clay courts in Lugano, Switzerland that was part of the 1986 Virginia Slims World Championship Series. It was the 10th edition of the tournament and was held from 19 May until 25 May 1986. Third-seeded Raffaella Reggi won the singles title.

== Finals ==
=== Singles ===
(Italy) Raffaella Reggi defeated (Bulgaria) Manuela Maleeva 5–7, 6–3, 7–6^{(8–6)}

- It was Reggi's 1st singles title of the year and the 2nd of her career.

=== Doubles ===
(United States) Elise Burgin / (United States) Betsy Nagelsen defeated (Australia) Jenny Byrne / (Australia) Janine Thompson 6–2, 6–3
