= Freiburg Open =

Defunct tennis tournament
- Event name: Freiburg Open
- Tour: WTA Tour
- Founded: 1983
- Abolished: 1983
- Editions: 1
- Location: Freiburg, West Germany
- Surface: Clay / outdoor

The Freiburg Open is a defunct WTA Tour affiliated women's tennis tournament played on one occasion in 1983. It was held in Freiburg in West Germany and played on outdoor clay courts.

== Finals ==
=== Singles ===
Year	Champions	Runners-up	Score
1983	(France) Catherine Tanvier	(Peru) Laura Arraya	6–4, 7–5

=== Doubles ===
Year	Champions	Runners-up	Score
1983	(West Germany) Bettina Bunge (West Germany) Eva Pfaff	(Argentina) Ivanna Madruga-Osses (Argentina) Emilse Raponi-Longo	6–1, 6–2
