= 1991 Geneva European Open =

- Date: 20–26 May
- Edition: 15th
- Category: Tier IV
- Draw: 28S / 16D
- Prize money: $150,000
- Surface: Clay / outdoor
- Location: Geneva, Switzerland

Champions

Singles
- (Switzerland) Manuela Maleeva-Fragniere

Doubles
- (Australia) Nicole Provis / (Australia) Elizabeth Smylie
← 1990 ·	WTA Swiss Open	· 1992 →

The 1991 Geneva European Open was a women's tennis tournament played on outdoor clay courts in Geneva, Switzerland that was part of the Tier IV category of the 1991 WTA Tour. It was the 15th edition of the tournament and was held from 20 May until 26 May 1991. Second-seeded Manuela Maleeva-Fragniere won the singles title and earned $27,000 first-prize money.

== Finals ==
=== Singles ===
(Switzerland) Manuela Maleeva-Fragniere defeated (Canada) Helen Kelesi 6–3, 3–6, 6–3

- It was Maleeva-Fragniere'a 2nd singles title of the year and the 14th of her career.

=== Doubles ===
(Australia) Nicole Provis / (Australia) Elizabeth Smylie defeated (Switzerland) Cathy Caverzasio / (Switzerland) Manuela Maleeva-Fragnière 6–1, 6–2
