= 1982 Toyota Swiss Open =

- Date: 10 – 16 May
- Edition: 7th
- Category: Toyota Series (Cat 3)
- Draw: 56S / 32D
- Prize money: $100,000
- Surface: Clay / outdoor
- Location: Lugano, Switzerland
- Venue: Lido Club

Champions

Singles
- (United States) Chris Evert-Lloyd

Doubles
- (United States) Candy Reynolds / (United States) Paula Smith
← 1981 ·	WTA Swiss Open	· 1983 →

The 1982 Toyota Swiss Open was a women's tennis tournament played on outdoor clay courts at the Lido Club in Lugano, Switzerland that was part of the Toyota Series of the 1982 WTA Tour. The tournament was held from 10 May until 16 May 1982. First-seeded Chris Evert-Lloyd won the singles title and earned $18,000 first-prize money.

== Finals ==
=== Singles ===
(United States) Chris Evert-Lloyd defeated (Hungary) Andrea Temesvári 6–0, 6–3

- It was Evert-Lloyd's 4th singles title of the year and the 114th of her career.

=== Doubles ===
(United States) Candy Reynolds / (United States) Paula Smith defeated (United States) Jennifer Russell / (Romania) Virginia Ruzici 6–2, 6–4

== Prize money ==
Event	W	F	SF	QF	Round of 16	Round of 32	Round of 64
Singles	$18,000	$9,000	$4,650	$2,200	$1,100	$550	$275
