= 1984 WTA Swiss Open =

- Date: 7–13 May
- Edition: 8th
- Draw: 32S / 16D
- Prize money: $100,000
- Surface: Clay / outdoor
- Location: Lugano, Switzerland

Champions

Singles
- (Bulgaria) Manuela Maleeva

Doubles
- (Switzerland) Christiane Jolissaint (Netherlands) Marcella Mesker
← 1983 ·	WTA Swiss Open	· 1985 →

The 1984 WTA Swiss Open was a women's tennis tournament played on outdoor clay courts in Lugano, Switzerland that was part of the 1984 Virginia Slims World Championship Series. The tournament was held from 7 May through 13 May 1984. Third-seeded Manuela Maleeva won the singles title.

== Finals ==
=== Singles ===
(Bulgaria) Manuela Maleeva defeated (Czechoslovakia) Iva Budařová 6–1, 6–1

- It was Maleeva's 1st career title.

=== Doubles ===
(Switzerland) Christiane Jolissaint / (Netherlands) Marcella Mesker defeated (Czechoslovakia) Iva Budařova / (Czechoslovakia) Marcela Skuherská 6–1, 6–2

- It was Jolissaint's 2nd title of the year and the 3rd of her career. It was Mesker's 3rd title of the year and the 5th of her career.
