= 1989 European Open – Doubles =

Doubles
- 1989 European Open
- 1988 Champions: (Switzerland) Christiane Jolissaint; (South Africa) Dianne Van Rensburg

Final
- Champions: (United States) Katrina Adams; (United States) Lori McNeil
- Runners-up: (Soviet Union) Larisa Savchenko; (Soviet Union) Natasha Zvereva
- Score: 2–6, 6–3, 6–4

Events
Singles	Doubles
← 1988 ·	European Open	· 1990 →

Christiane Jolissaint and Dianne Van Rensburg were the defending champions but only van Rensburg competed that year with Belinda Cordwell.

Cordwell and van Rensburg lost in the quarterfinals to Sandra Cecchini and Laura Gildemeister.

Katrina Adams and Lori McNeil won in the final 2–6, 6–3, 6–4 against Larisa Savchenko and Natasha Zvereva.

== Seeds ==
Champion seeds are indicated in bold text while text in italics indicates the round in which those seeds were eliminated.

1. (Soviet Union) Larisa Savchenko / (Soviet Union) Natasha Zvereva (final)
2. (United States) **Katrina Adams** / (United States) **Lori McNeil (champions)**
3. (United States) Elise Burgin / (United States) Betsy Nagelsen (semifinals)
4. (New Zealand) Belinda Cordwell / (South Africa) Dianne Van Rensburg (quarterfinals)

== Draw ==
=== Key ===
- Q = Qualifier
- WC = Wild card
- LL = Lucky loser
- Alt = Alternate
- SE = Special exempt
- PR = Protected ranking
- ITF = ITF entry
- JE = Junior exempt
- w/o = Walkover
- r = Retired
- d = Defaulted
- SR = Special ranking

First round

Quarterfinals

Semifinals

Final

1
- (Soviet Union) **L Savchenko**
- (Soviet Union) **N Zvereva**
**6**
**6**

- (Luxembourg) K Kschwendt
- (Austria) P Ritter
2
1

1
- (Soviet Union) **L Savchenko**
- (Soviet Union) **N Zvereva**
**6**
**6**

- (Italy) **L Garrone**
- (Italy) **L Golarsa**
**6**
**6**

- (Italy) L Garrone
- (Italy) L Golarsa
2
2

- (United States) L Allen
- (United States) B Bowes
1
4

1
- (Soviet Union) **L Savchenko**
- (Soviet Union) **N Zvereva**
**6**
**6**

4
- (New Zealand) **B Cordwell**
- (South Africa) **D Van Rensburg**
**6**
**6**

- (Italy) S Cecchini
- (Peru) L Gildemeister
4
1

- (Switzerland) M de Lenart
- (Switzerland) N Welte
2
1

4
- (New Zealand) B Cordwell
- (South Africa) D Van Rensburg

- (West Germany) C Kohde-Kilsch
- (West Germany) C Porwik
1
2
r

- (Italy) **S Cecchini**
- (Peru) **L Gildemeister**
**w/o**

- (Italy) **S Cecchini**
- (Peru) **L Gildemeister**
**6**
**4**

1
- (Soviet Union) Larisa Savchenko
- (Soviet Union) Natasha Zvereva
**6**
3
4

- (Canada) R Simpson
- (United States) R Winebarger
6
4

2
- (United States) **Katrina Adams**
- (United States) **Lori McNeil**
2
**6**
**6**

- (United States) **J Smoller**
- (Sweden) **M Strandlund**
**7**
**6**

- (United States) J Smoller
- (Sweden) M Strandlund
5
**6**
2

- (Spain) R Bielsa
- (Spain) J Souto
1
2

3
- (United States) **E Burgin**
- (United States) **B Nagelsen**
**7**
4
**6**

3
- (United States) **E Burgin**
- (United States) **B Nagelsen**
**6**
**6**

3
- (United States) E Burgin
- (United States) B Nagelsen
2
**6**
3

- (United States) C Benjamin
- (West Germany) C Schneider
1
3

2
- (United States) **K Adams**
- (United States) **L McNeil**
**6**
4
**6**

- (Sweden) **C Lindqvist**
- (United States) **M McGrath**
**6**
**6**

- (Sweden) C Lindqvist
- (United States) M McGrath
3
5

- (Australia) J Byrne
- (United States) K Rinaldi
**6**
3
1/r

2
- (United States) **K Adams**
- (United States) **L McNeil**
**6**
**7**

2
- (United States) **K Adams**
- (United States) **L McNeil**
2
**6**
**5**
