= 1991 Geneva European Open – Doubles =

Doubles
- 1991 Geneva European Open

Final
- Champions: (Australia) Nicole Provis (Australia) Elizabeth Smylie
- Runners-up: (Switzerland) Cathy Caverzasio (Switzerland) Manuela Maleeva-Fragnière
- Score: 6–1, 6–2

Details
- Draw: 16
- Seeds: 4

Events
| Singles | Doubles |
| ← 1990 · | WTA Swiss Open | · 1992 → |

Louise Field and Dianne Van Rensburg were the defending champions, but none competed this year.

Nicole Provis and Elizabeth Smylie won the title by defeating Cathy Caverzasio and Manuela Maleeva-Fragnière 6–1, 6–2 in the final.

== Seeds ==
1. (Australia) Nicole Provis / (Australia) Elizabeth Smylie (champions)
2. (South Africa) Rosalyn Fairbank-Nideffer / (South Africa) Elna Reinach (semifinals)
3. (Germany) Eva Pfaff / (Australia) Rennae Stubbs (first round)
4. (Switzerland) Cathy Caverzasio / (Switzerland) Manuela Maleeva-Fragnière (final)

== Draw ==
=== Key ===
- Q = Qualifier
- WC = Wild card
- LL = Lucky loser
- Alt = Alternate
- SE = Special exempt
- PR = Protected ranking
- ITF = ITF entry
- JE = Junior exempt
- w/o = Walkover
- r = Retired
- d = Defaulted
- SR = Special ranking

=== Draw ===
First round
1 | (Australia) N Provis (Australia) E Smylie | 6 | 7^{7}
(Australia) D Jones (Czechoslovakia) R Maršíková | 0 | 6^{1}
(France) N Ballet (France) Agnes Romand | 1 | 5
(Spain) C Martínez (Austria) B Paulus | 6 | 7
3 | (Germany) E Pfaff (Australia) R Stubbs | 4 | 4
(United States) S Stafford (United States) T Whitlinger | 6 | 6
(Australia) K Godridge (Japan) M Kidowaki | 6 | 7
(Uruguay) P Miller (Australia) C Thompson | 2 | 5
(Hungary) C Bartos (Switzerland) M Strebel | 6^{0} | 0
(United States) B Bowes (United States) M Werdel | 7^{7} | 6
(South Africa) A Coetzer (United States) G Helgeson | 0 | 4
4 | (Switzerland) C Caverzasio (Switzerland) M Maleeva-Fragnière | 6 | 6
(Bulgaria) K Maleeva (Germany) C Porwik | 7 | 6
(Switzerland) N Tschan (Switzerland) E Zardo | 5 | 4
(United States) S Schefflin (Japan) T Takagi | 2 | 1
2 | (South Africa) R Fairbank-Nideffer (South Africa) E Reinach | 6 | 6

Quarterfinals
1 | (Australia) N Provis (Australia) E Smylie | w/o
(Spain) C Martínez (Austria) B Paulus
(United States) S Stafford (United States) T Whitlinger | 0 | 6 | 2
(Australia) K Godridge (Japan) M Kidowaki | 6 | 4 | 6
(United States) B Bowes (United States) M Werdel
4 | (Switzerland) C Caverzasio (Switzerland) M Maleeva-Fragnière | w/o
(Bulgaria) K Maleeva (Germany) C Porwik | 1 | 1
2 | (South Africa) R Fairbank-Nideffer (South Africa) E Reinach | 6 | 6

Semifinals
1 | (Australia) N Provis (Australia) E Smylie | 6 | 6
(Australia) K Godridge (Japan) M Kidowaki | 3 | 2
4 | (Switzerland) C Caverzasio (Switzerland) M Maleeva-Fragnière | 6 | 6
2 | (South Africa) R Fairbank-Nideffer (South Africa) E Reinach | 2 | 2

Final
1 | (Australia) N Provis (Australia) E Smylie | 6 | 6
4 | (Switzerland) C Caverzasio (Switzerland) M Maleeva-Fragnière | 1 | 2
