= 1989 European Open – Singles =

Singles
- 1989 European Open
- 1988 Champion: (Austria) Barbara Paulus

Final
- Champion: (Bulgaria) Manuela Maleeva-Fragnière
- Runner-up: (Spain) Conchita Martínez
- Score: 6–4, 6–0

Details
- Draw: 32
- Seeds: 8

Events
Singles	Doubles
← 1988 ·	European Open	· 1990 →

Barbara Paulus was the defending champion but lost in the semifinals to Conchita Martínez.

Manuela Maleeva-Fragnière won in the final 6–4, 6–0 against Martínez.

== Seeds ==
A champion seed is indicated in bold text while text in italics indicates the round in which that seed was eliminated.

1. (United States) Chris Evert (second round)
2. (Soviet Union) Natasha Zvereva (first round)
3. (Bulgaria) **Manuela Maleeva-Fragnière (champion)**
4. (Spain) Conchita Martínez (final)
5. (West Germany) Claudia Kohde-Kilsch (first round)
6. (United States) Lori McNeil (first round)
7. (Italy) Sandra Cecchini (first round)
8. (Sweden) Catarina Lindqvist (second round)

== Draw ==
=== Key ===
- Q = Qualifier
- WC = Wild card
- LL = Lucky loser
- Alt = Alternate
- SE = Special exempt
- PR = Protected ranking
- ITF = ITF entry
- JE = Junior exempt
- w/o = Walkover
- r = Retired
- d = Defaulted
- SR = Special ranking

First round
1	(United States) **C Evert**	**6**	**7**
Q	(West Germany) S Hack	3	6
(South Africa) D Van Rensburg	2	1
(Austria) **B Paulus**	**6**	**6**
(Canada) R Simpson	1	2
(Soviet Union) **L Savchenko**	**6**	**6**
(Sweden) M Strandlund	0	**6**	1
8	(Sweden) **C Lindqvist**	**6**	4	**6**
4	(Spain) **C Martínez**	**6**	**6**
(Italy) C Caverzasio	2	1
(United States) K Adams	0	0
(Peru) **L Gildemeister**	**6**	**6**
(New Zealand) **B Cordwell**	**6**	**6**
(Australia) J Byrne	1	3
(United States) **C Benjamin**	**6**	**6**
5	(West Germany) C Kohde-Kilsch	2	2
6	(United States) L McNeil	4	**6**	3
(Switzerland) **C Cohen**	**6**	2	**6**
Q	(Switzerland) E Zardo	3	**6**	3
(United States) **E Burgin**	**6**	2	**6**
(United States) **B Bowes**	**6**	1	**6**
(Greece) A Kanellopoulou	2	**6**	4
(Soviet Union) L Meskhi	5	0
3	(Bulgaria) **M Maleeva-Fragnière**	**7**	**6**
7	(Italy) S Cecchini	2	**6**	5
(Luxembourg) **K Kschwendt**	**6**	3	**7**
(Italy) L Golarsa	0	5
(Italy) **L Lapi**	**6**	**7**
Q	(France) S Amiach	3	1
(Italy) **L Garrone**	**6**	**6**
Q	(United States) **S Stafford**	**6**	**7**
2	(Soviet Union) N Zvereva	3	6

Second round
1	(United States) C Evert	4	1
(Austria) **B Paulus**	**6**	**6**
(Soviet Union) **L Savchenko**	**7**	0	**6**
8	(Sweden) C Lindqvist	5	**6**	2
4	(Spain) **C Martínez**	**6**	**6**
(Peru) L Gildemeister	0	3
(New Zealand) **B Cordwell**	**6**	2	**7**
(United States) C Benjamin	2	**6**	6
(Switzerland) C Cohen	4	5
(United States) **E Burgin**	**6**	**7**
(United States) B Bowes	1	0
3	(Bulgaria) **M Maleeva-Fragnière**	**6**	**6**
(Luxembourg) K Kschwendt	5	4
(Italy) **L Lapi**	**7**	**6**
(Italy) **L Garrone**	**6**	**6**
Q	(United States) S Stafford	0	3

Quarterfinals
(Austria) **B Paulus**	**6**	5	**6**
(Soviet Union) L Savchenko	1	**7**	4
4	(Spain) **C Martínez**	**w/o**
(New Zealand) B Cordwell
(United States) E Burgin	4	1
3	(Bulgaria) **M Maleeva-Fragnière**	**6**	**6**
(Italy) L Lapi	6	2
(Italy) **L Garrone**	**7**	**6**

Semifinals
(Austria) B Paulus	**6**	5	2
4	(Spain) **C Martínez**	4	**7**	**6**
3	(Bulgaria) **M Maleeva-Fragnière**	**6**	**7**
(Italy) L Garrone	3	5

Final
4	(Spain) Conchita Martínez	4	0
3	(Bulgaria) **Manuela Maleeva-Fragnière**	**6**	**6**
