= 1991 Geneva European Open – Singles =

Singles
- 1991 Geneva European Open
- 1990 Champion: (Austria) Barbara Paulus

Final
- Champion: (Switzerland) Manuela Maleeva-Fragnière
- Runner-up: (Canada) Helen Kelesi
- Score: 6–3, 3–6, 6–3

Details
- Draw: 28 (4Q/1LL)
- Seeds: 8

Events
Singles	Doubles
← 1990 ·	WTA Swiss Open	· 1992 →

Barbara Paulus was the defending champion, but did not compete this year.

Manuela Maleeva-Fragnière won the title by defeating Helen Kelesi 6–3, 3–6, 6–3 in the final.

== Seeds ==
The first four seeds received a bye into the second round.

1. (Spain) Conchita Martínez (semifinals)
2. (Switzerland) Manuela Maleeva-Fragnière (champion)
3. (n/a)
4. (Canada) Helen Kelesi (final)
5. (Switzerland) Emanuela Zardo (second round)
6. (United States) Marianne Werdel (second round)
7. (South Africa) Rosalyn Fairbank-Nideffer (first round)
8. (Bulgaria) Magdalena Maleeva (second round)

== Draw ==
=== Key ===
- Q = Qualifier
- WC = Wild card
- LL = Lucky loser
- Alt = Alternate
- ITF = ITF entry
- PR = Protected ranking
- SR = Special ranking
- SE = Special exempt
- JE = Junior exempt
- JR = Junior Accelerator Programme entrant
- CO = College Accelerator Programme entrant
- NG = Next Gen Accelerator Program entrant
- w/o = Walkover
- r = Retired
- d = Defaulted

=== Finals ===
Semifinals
1	(Spain) Conchita Martínez	4	7^{7}	2
4	(Canada) Helen Kelesi	6	6^{5}	6
LL	(United States) Tami Whitlinger	1	3
2	(Switzerland) Manuela Maleeva-Fragnière	6	6

Final
4	(Canada) Helen Kelesi	3	6	3
2	(Switzerland) Manuela Maleeva-Fragnière	6	3	6

=== Top half ===
First round
(Sweden) C Dahlman	4	3
(Italy) L Ferrando	6	6
(South Africa) E Reinach	4	6	6^{2}
(Switzerland) C Fauche	6	3	7^{7}
(Germany) S Hack	6	6
7	(South Africa) R Fairbank-Nideffer	1	1
(Hungary) C Barthos	6	2	1
(France) C Mothes	4	6	6
LL	(Australia) L Field	3	5
(United States) G Helgeson	6	7
Q	(South Africa) A Coetzer	3	0
5	(Switzerland) E Zardo	6	6

Second round
1	(Spain) C Martínez	6	6
(Italy) L Ferrando	0	2
(Switzerland) C Fauche	6	7
(Germany) S Hack	2	5
4	(Canada) H Kelesi	7	6
(France) C Mothes	5	3
(United States) G Helgeson	4	6	6
5	(Switzerland) E Zardo	6	2	4

Quarterfinals
1	(Spain) C Martínez	6	6
(Switzerland) C Fauche	3	3
4	(Canada) H Kelesi	6^{0}	7	6
(United States) G Helgeson	7^{7}	5	1

Semifinals
1	(Spain) C Martínez	4	7^{7}	2
4	(Canada) H Kelesi	6	6^{5}	6

=== Bottom half ===
First round
6	(United States) M Werdel	4	6	6
(Switzerland) C Caverzasio	6	3	3
(Germany) C Porwik	5	2
(Japan) M Kidowaki	7	6
(Italy) K Piccolini	6	6
Q	(Australia) N Pratt	4	4
8	(Bulgaria) M Maleeva	6	3	7^{7}
(Australia) N Provis	3	6	6^{5}
LL	(Brazil) S Giusto	6^{0}	3
Q	(United States) S Stafford	7^{7}	6
Q	(Italy) N Baudone	4	6	5
(Czechoslovakia) K Habšudová	6	4	7

Second round
6	(United States) M Werdel	6	2	4
(Japan) M Kidowaki	1	6	6
(Italy) K Piccolini	3	2
LL	(United States) T Whitlinger	6	6
8	(Bulgaria) M Maleeva	4	3
Q	(United States) S Stafford	6	6
(Czechoslovakia) K Habšudová	1	6	1
2	(Switzerland) M Maleeva-Fragnière	6	2	6

Quarterfinals
(Japan) M Kidowaki	4	6^{4}
LL	(United States) T Whitlinger	6	7^{7}
Q	(United States) S Stafford	4	3
2	(Switzerland) M Maleeva-Fragnière	6	6

Semifinals
LL	(United States) T Whitlinger	1	3
2	(Switzerland) M Maleeva-Fragnière	6	6
