= 1983 WTA Swiss Open =

- Date: 9–14 May
- Edition: 8th
- Draw: 56S / 31D
- Surface: Clay / outdoor
- Location: Lugano, Switzerland

Champions

Singles
- n/a

Doubles
- (Switzerland) Christiane Jolissaint / (Netherlands) Marcella Mesker
← 1982 ·	WTA Swiss Open	· 1984 →

The 1983 WTA Swiss Open was a women's tennis tournament played on outdoor clay courts in Lugano, Switzerland that was part of the 1983 Virginia Slims World Championship Series. It was the eighth edition of the tournament and was held from 9 May until 14 May 1983.

== Finals ==
=== Singles ===
The singles tournament was cancelled following the conclusion of the third round due to rain.^{[A]}

=== Doubles ===
(Switzerland) Christiane Jolissaint / (Netherlands) Marcella Mesker defeated (Switzerland) Petra Delhees / (Brazil) Patricia Medrado 6–2, 3–6, 7–5

- It was Jolissaint's 1st career title. It was Mesker's 1st career title.

== Notes ==
- ^{A} The tournament was halted by rain delays on 23 occasions over the first five days. The tournament was eventually cancelled after players rejected the officials attempts to move the tournament indoors.
