= 1990 Geneva European Open =

- Date: 21–27 May
- Edition: 14th
- Category: Tier IV
- Draw: 32S / 16D
- Prize money: $150,000
- Surface: Clay / outdoor
- Location: Geneva, Switzerland

Champions

Singles
- (Austria) Barbara Paulus

Doubles
- (Australia) Louise Field / (South Africa) Dianne Van Rensburg
← 1989 ·	WTA Swiss Open	· 1991 →

The 1990 Geneva European Open was a women's tennis tournament played on outdoor clay courts in Geneva, Switzerland that was part of the Tier IV category of the 1990 WTA Tour. It was the 14th edition of the tournament and was held from 21 May until 27 May 1990. Second-seeded Barbara Paulus won the singles title.

== Finals ==
=== Singles ===
(Austria) Barbara Paulus defeated (Canada) Helen Kelesi 2–6, 7–5, 7–6^{(7–3)}

- It was Paulus' 1st singles title of the year and the 2nd of her career.

=== Doubles ===
(Australia) Louise Field / (South Africa) Dianne Van Rensburg defeated (United States) Elise Burgin / (United States) Betsy Nagelsen 5–7, 7–6^{(7–2)}, 7–5
