= Cesena Championship =

Defunct tennis tournament
- Event name: Cesena Championship
- Tour: WTA Tour
- Founded: 1992
- Abolished: 1992
- Surface: Carpet

The Cesena Championship is a defunct WTA Tour affiliated women's tennis tournament played in 1992. It was held in Cesena in Italy and played on indoor carpet courts.

== Results ==
=== Women's singles ===
| Year | Champion | Runner-up | Score |
|---|---|---|---|
| 1992 | (France) Mary Pierce | (France) Catherine Tanvier | 6–1, 6–1 |

=== Women's doubles ===
| Year | Champions | Runners-up | Score |
|---|---|---|---|
| 1992 | (France) Catherine Suire (France) Catherine Tanvier | (Belgium) Sabine Appelmans (Italy) Raffaella Reggi | walkover |
