= 1985 WTA Swiss Open =

- Date: 20–26 May
- Edition: 9th
- Draw: 48S / 24D
- Prize money: $100,000
- Surface: Clay / outdoor
- Location: Lugano, Switzerland

Champions

Singles
- (United States) Bonnie Gadusek

Doubles
- (United States) Bonnie Gadusek (Czechoslovakia) Helena Suková
← 1984 ·	WTA Swiss Open	· 1986 →

The 1985 WTA Swiss Open was a women's tennis tournament played on outdoor clay courts in Lugano, Switzerland that was part of the 1985 Virginia Slims World Championship Series. It was the ninth edition of the tournament and was held from 20 May through 26 May 1985. Third-seeded Bonnie Gadusek won the singles title.

== Finals ==
=== Singles ===
(United States) Bonnie Gadusek defeated (Bulgaria) Manuela Maleeva 6–2, 6–2

- It was Gadusek's 2nd singles title of the year and the 3rd of her career.

=== Doubles ===
(United States) Bonnie Gadusek / (Czechoslovakia) Helena Suková defeated (West Germany) Bettina Bunge / (West Germany) Eva Pfaff 6–2, 6–4
