= 1989 European Open =

- Date: 22 – 28 May
- Edition: 13th
- Category: Category 2
- Draw: 32S / 16D
- Prize money: $100,000
- Surface: Clay / outdoor
- Location: Geneva, Switzerland
- Venue: Drizia-Miremont Tennis Club

Champions

Singles
- (Bulgaria) Manuela Maleeva

Doubles
- (United States) Katrina Adams / (United States) Lori McNeil
- WTA Swiss Open

The 1989 European Open was a women's tennis tournament played on outdoor clay courts at the Drizia-Miremont Tennis Club in Geneva, Switzerland that was part of the Category 2 tier of the 1989 WTA Tour. The tournament was held from 22 May until 28 May 1989. Third-seeded Manuela Maleeva won the singles title.

== Finals ==
=== Singles ===
(Bulgaria) Manuela Maleeva defeated (Spain) Conchita Martínez 6–4, 6–0

- It was Maleeva's 2nd title of the year and the 14th of her career.

=== Doubles ===
(United States) Katrina Adams / (United States) Lori McNeil defeated (Soviet Union) Larisa Savchenko / (Soviet Union) Natasha Zvereva 2–6, 6–3, 6–4

- It was Adams' 4th title of the year and the 8th of her career. It was McNeil's 2nd title of the year and the 20th of her career.
