= 1987 European Open =

- Date: 18–24 May
- Edition: 11th
- Category: 2
- Draw: 56S / 24D
- Prize money: $100,000
- Surface: Clay / outdoor
- Location: Geneva, Switzerland

Champions

Singles
- (United States) Chris Evert

Doubles
- (United States) Betsy Nagelsen (Australia) Elizabeth Smylie
← 1986 ·	WTA Swiss Open	· 1988 →

The 1987 European Open was a women's tennis tournament played on outdoor clay courts in Geneva, Switzerland that was part of the Category 2 tier of the 1987 Virginia Slims World Championship Series. It was the 11th edition of the tournament and was held from 18 May until 24 May 1987. First-seeded Chris Evert won the singles title, her third at the event after 1981 and 1982.

== Finals ==
=== Singles ===
(United States) Chris Evert defeated (Bulgaria) Manuela Maleeva 6–3, 4–6, 6–2

- It was Evert's 4th singles title of the year and the 152nd of her career.

=== Doubles ===
(United States) Betsy Nagelsen / (Australia) Elizabeth Smylie defeated (Peru) Laura Gildemeister / (France) Catherine Tanvier 4–6, 6–4, 6–3
