= WTA Nice Open =

Defunct tennis tournament
- Event name: Nice Open
- Tour: WTA Tour
- Founded: 1988
- Abolished: 1988
- Editions: 1
- Location: Nice, France
- Venue: Nice Lawn Tennis Club
- Surface: Clay

The WTA Nice Open is a defunct WTA Tour affiliated women's tennis tournament played in July 1988. It was held at the Nice Lawn Tennis Club in Nice in France and played on outdoor clay courts.

== Results ==
=== Singles ===
Year	Champion	Runner-up	Score
1988	(Italy) Sandra Cecchini	(France) Nathalie Tauziat	7–5, 6–4

=== Doubles ===
Year	Champions	Runners-up	Score
1988	(France) Catherine Suire (France) Catherine Tanvier	(France) Isabelle Demongeot (France) Nathalie Tauziat	6–4, 4–6, 6–2
