= Sandrine Jaquet =

Swiss tennis player

- Country (sports): Switzerland
- Born: 14 April 1971 (age 53)
- Prize money: $31,277

Singles
- Highest ranking: No. 170 (24 April 1989)

Grand Slam singles results
- Australian Open: 1R (1989)

Doubles
- Highest ranking: No. 132 (30 January 1989)

Grand Slam doubles results
- Australian Open: 2R (1989)

Sandrine Jaquet (born 14 April 1971) is a Swiss former professional tennis player.

Jaquet reached a best ranking of 170 in the world on the professional tour. In 1988, as a 17-year-old, she played two Federation Cup ties for Switzerland, against the United States and Great Britain. She made her only grand slam main draw appearance at the 1989 Australian Open, where she competed in both the singles and doubles.

== ITF finals ==
$25,000 tournaments
$10,000 tournaments

=== Singles: 2 (1–1) ===
Result	No.	Date	Tournament	Surface	Opponent	Score
Loss	1.	5 September 1988	Porto, Portugal	Clay	(Czechoslovakia) Petra Langrová	4–6, 1–6
Win	1.	30 April 1990	Lee-on-Solent, United Kingdom	Clay	(United States) Dierdre Herman	4–6, 6–4, 6–1

=== Doubles: 3 (1–2) ===
Result	No.	Date	Tournament	Surface	Partner	Opponents	Score
Loss	1.	31 August 1987	Vilamoura, Portugal	Clay	(Switzerland) Andrea Martinelli	(Spain) Ana Segura (Argentina) Gaby Castro	2–6, 1–6
Win	1.	5 September 1988	Porto, Portugal	Clay	(West Germany) Martina Pawlik	(Sweden) Cecilia Dahlman (Sweden) Helena Dahlström	6–3, 6–1
Loss	2.	23 October 1989	Burgdorf, Switzerland	Carpet	(Switzerland) Eva Krapl	(Soviet Union) Elena Bryukhovets (Soviet Union) Eugenia Maniokova	4–6, 2–6

== See also ==
- List of Switzerland Fed Cup team representatives
