= Catherine Tanvier =

French tennis player

- Country (sports): France
- Born: 28 May 1965 (age 61) Toulouse, France
- Height: 1.74 m (5 ft 8 1/2 in)
- Retired: 2000
- Plays: Right (two-handed backhand)
- Prize money: $706,054

Singles
- Career record: 205–198
- Career titles: 1
- Highest ranking: No. 20 (27 September 1984)

Grand Slam singles results
- Australian Open: 4R (1989, 1990, 1991)
- French Open: 4R (1983, 1988)
- Wimbledon: 4R (1985)
- US Open: 2R (1981, 1983, 1984, 1986)

Other tournaments
- Olympic Games: SF (1984)

Doubles
- Career record: 285–180
- Career titles: 9
- Highest ranking: No. 16 (21 December 1986)

Grand Slam doubles results
- Australian Open: QF (1980, 1989)
- French Open: SF (1983)
- Wimbledon: QF (1986)
- US Open: 3R (1984)

Grand Slam mixed doubles results
- Australian Open: 2R (1988)
- Wimbledon: 3R (1983, 1985)
- US Open: 2R (1984)

Team competitions
- Fed Cup: 10–7

Catherine ("Cathy") Tanvier (born 28 May 1965) is a former professional tennis player from France.

She peaked at No. 20 in 1984 and won one singles title and nine doubles titles on the WTA Tour.

== Career ==
In 1982, Tanvier became Wimbledon girls' singles champion after defeating first-seeded Helena Suková in the final in straight sets.

Tanvier won one singles title on the WTA Tour, at the 1983 Freiburg Open clay court tournament, defeating Laura Arraya in the final, in straight sets.

At the Wimbledon Championships she reached the fourth round in the singles event in 1985, which she lost to eight-seeded Zina Garrison. Reaching the fourth round was also her best singles result at the Australian Open (1989, 1990, 1991) and French Open (1983, 1988). Her best career result at a Grand Slam tournament was reaching the semifinal of the 1983 French Open women's doubles event with Ivanna Madruga.

Tanvier published two biographies; in 2007 she wrote Déclassée – de Roland-Garros au RMI, (Note: RMI stands for Revenu minimum d'insertion, a form of social welfare in France.) and in 2013 published Détraquements, de la colère à la torpeur.

In 2010, she made her debut as an actress in Jean-Luc Godard's Film Socialisme.

Catherine Tanvier lives in Nice, France.

== WTA Tour finals ==
=== Singles: 5 (1 title, 4 runner-ups) ===
Legend
Tier I
Tier II
Tier III
Tier IV & V

Result	W/L	Date	Tournament	Surface	Opponent	Score
Loss	0–1	Mar 1982	VS of Hershey, United States	Hard (i)	(Hungary) Andrea Temesvári	4–6, 2–6
Win	1–1	Jul 1983	Freiburg Open, West Germany	Clay	(Peru) Laura Arraya	6–4, 7–5
Loss	1–2	Oct 1983	Porsche Grand Prix, West Germany	Carpet (i)	(United States) Martina Navratilova	1–6, 2–6
Loss	1–3	Oct 1986	Hilversum Trophy, Netherlands	Carpet (i)	(Czechoslovakia) Helena Suková	2–6, 5–7
Loss	1–4	Feb 1992	Cesena Championship, Italy	Carpet (i)	(France) Mary Pierce	1–6, 1–6

=== Doubles: 21 (9 titles, 12 runner-ups) ===
Winner-Legend
Tier I	0
Tier II	1
Tier III	0
Tier IV & V	2

Titles by surface
Hard	2
Clay	5
Grass	0
Carpet	2

Result	W-L	Date	Tournament	Surface	Partner	Opponents	Score
Win	1–0	Jul 1982	Tournoi de Monte Carlo, Monaco	Clay	(Romania) Virginia Ruzici	(Brazil) Patricia Medrado (Brazil) Cláudia Monteiro	7–6, 6–2
Win	2–0	Aug 1982	Indianapolis Clay Court, US	Clay	(Argentina) Ivanna Madruga	(United States) Joanne Russell (Romania) Virginia Ruzici	7–5, 7–6^{(7–4)}
Loss	2–1	May 1983	Perugia Open, Italy	Clay	(Argentina) Ivanna Madruga	(Romania) Virginia Ruzici (United Kingdom) Virginia Wade	3–6, 6–2, 1–6
Loss	2–2	Jul 1983	Hittfeld Cup, West Germany	Clay	(Argentina) Ivanna Madruga	(West Germany) Bettina Bunge (West Germany) Claudia Kohde-Kilsch	5–7, 4–6
Loss	2–3	Oct 1983	Porsche Tennis Grand Prix, West Germany	Carpet (i)	(Romania) Virginia Ruzici	(United States) Martina Navratilova (United States) Candy Reynolds	2–6, 1–6
Loss	2–4	Dec 1984	Pan Pacific Open, Japan	Carpet (i)	(Australia) Elizabeth Smylie	(West Germany) Claudia Kohde-Kilsch (Czechoslovakia) Helena Suková	4–6, 1–6
Loss	2–5	May 1985	Berlin, West Germany	Clay	(West Germany) Steffi Graf	(West Germany) Claudia Kohde-Kilsch (Czechoslovakia) Helena Suková	4–6, 1–6
Win	3–5	Nov 1985	Hilversum Trophy, Netherlands	Carpet (i)	(Netherlands) Marcella Mesker	(Italy) Sandra Cecchini (Socialist Federal Republic of Yugoslavia) Sabrina Goleš	6–2, 6–2
Loss	3–6	Apr 1986	Hilton Head, US	Clay	(West Germany) Steffi Graf	(United States) Chris Evert-Lloyd (United States) Anne White	3–6, 3–6
Loss	3–7	Apr 1986	Amelia Island, US	Clay	(Argentina) Gabriela Sabatini	(West Germany) Claudia Kohde-Kilsch (Czechoslovakia) Helena Suková	2–6, 7–5, 6–7^{(7–9)}
Win	4–7	May 1986	Barcelona Open, Spain	Clay	(Czechoslovakia) Iva Budařová	(Austria) Petra Huber (West Germany) Petra Keppeler	6–2, 6–1
Loss	4–8	Oct 1986	Hilversum Trophy, Netherlands	Carpet (i)	(Denmark) Tine Scheuer-Larsen	(United States) Kathy Jordan (Czechoslovakia) Helena Suková	5–7, 1–6
Loss	4–9	Oct 1986	Brighton International, UK	Carpet (i)	(Denmark) Tine Scheuer-Larsen	(West Germany) Steffi Graf (Czechoslovakia) Helena Suková	4–6, 4–6
Loss	4–10	May 1987	Geneva Open, Switzerland	Clay	(Peru) Laura Gildemeister	(United States) Betsy Nagelsen (Australia) Elizabeth Smylie	6–4, 4–6, 3–6
Loss	4–11	Oct 1987	Brighton International, UK	Carpet (i)	(Denmark) Tine Scheuer-Larsen	(United States) Kathy Jordan (Czechoslovakia) Helena Suková	5–7, 1–6
Win	5–11	Jul 1988	Nice Open, France	Clay	(France) Catherine Suire	(France) Isabelle Demongeot (France) Nathalie Tauziat	6–4, 4–6, 6–2
Win	6–11	Jul 1988	Aix-en-Provence Open, France	Clay	(France) Nathalie Herreman	(Italy) Sandra Cecchini (Spain) Arantxa Sánchez Vicario	6–4, 7–5
Win	7–11	Oct 1989	Bayonne Open, France	Hard (i)	(Netherlands) Manon Bollegraf	(South Africa) Elna Reinach (Italy) Raffaella Reggi	7–6^{(7–3)}, 7–5
Win	8–11	Sep 1990	Bayonne Open, France	Hard (i)	(Australia) Louise Field	(Australia) Jo-Anne Faull (Australia) Rachel McQuillan	7–6^{(7–3)}, 6–7^{(5–7)}, 7–6^{(7–5)}
Loss	8–12	Sep 1991	Bayonne Open, France	Carpet (i)	(Australia) Rachel McQuillan	(Argentina) Patricia Tarabini (France) Nathalie Tauziat	3–6, retired
Win	9–12	Feb 1992	Cesena Championship, Italy	Carpet (i)	(France) Catherine Suire	(Belgium) Sabine Appelmans (Italy) Raffaella Reggi	w/o

== ITF finals ==
Legend
$25,000 tournaments
$10,000 tournaments

=== Singles (3–1) ===
Result	No.	Date	Tournament	Surface	Opponent	Score
Loss	1.	5 July 1981	ITF Limoges, France	Clay	(Argentina) Liliana Giussani	1–6, 1–6
Win	2.	26 November 1981	ITF Ringwood North, Australia	Hard	(Australia) Debbie Chesterton	6–4, 6–2
Win	3.	9 November 1981	ITF South Yarra, Australia	Hard	(France) Sophie Amiach	6–3, 6–1
Win	4.	27 March 1989	ITF Bayonne, France	Hard	(France) Pascale Etchemendy	6–2, 6–4

=== Doubles (11–6) ===
Result	No.	Date	Location	Surface	Partner	Opponents	Score
Loss	1.	26 April 1981	Bournemouth, UK	Clay	(France) Sophie Amiach	(United Kingdom) Jo Durie (United Kingdom) Debbie Jevans	0–6, 1–6
Win	2.	5 July 1981	Arcachon, France	Clay	(Peru) Laura Araya	(Romania) Florența Mihai (Spain) Carmen Perea	6–3, 7–5
Win	3.	2 November 1981	Frankston, Australia	Hard	(France) Sophie Amiach	(Australia) Kym Ruddell (Australia) Gwen Warnock	6–4, 6–2
Win	4.	1 February 1982	Ogden, US	Carpet (i)	(Czechoslovakia) Iva Budařová	(Czechoslovakia) Yvona Brzáková (Czechoslovakia) Marcela Skuherská	6–3, 6–2
Win	5.	8 February 1982	Bakersfield, United States	Carpet (i)	(Brazil) Cláudia Monteiro	(United States) Diane Desfor (United States) Barbara Hallquist	7–6, 2–6, 6–3
Win	6.	11 July 1982	Gstaad, Switzerland	Clay	(Romania) Virginia Ruzici	(West Germany) Claudia Kohde-Kilsch (West Germany) Heidi Eisterlehner	3–6, 6–3, 6–4
Win	7.	19 January 1987	Bayonne, France	Hard	(Romania) Virginia Ruzici	(Poland) Iwona Kuczynska (France) Corinne Vanier	6–3, 6–2
Win	8.	21 March 1988	Bayonne, France	Hard	(France) Pascale Paradis	(Netherlands) Carin Bakkum (Netherlands) Simone Schilder	4–6, 6–2, 6–4
Win	9.	27 March 1989	Moulins, France	Hard	(France) Sandrine Testud	(Netherlands) Mara Eijkenboom (France) Noëlle van Lottum	6–4, 6–3
Loss	10.	26 March 1990	Limoges, France	Carpet	(France) Sandrine Testud	(Belgium) Ann Devries (Poland) Iwona Kuczyńska	3–6, 6–3, 4–6
Win	11.	19 September 1994	Marseille, France	Clay	(Dominican Republic) Madeleine Sánchez	(Spain) Marta Cano (Spain) Cristina de Subijana	6–3, 6–2
Win	12.	12 December 1994	Mildura, Australia	Grass	(Canada) Vanessa Webb	(Australia) Catherine Barclay (Australia) Louise Pleming	7–6^{(4)}, 4–6, 6–3
Win	13.	20 March 1995	Moulins, France	Hard	(France) Nathalie Dechy	(Mexico) Jessica Fernández (Australia) Aarthi Venkatesan	6–1, 6–3
Loss	14.	27 November 1995	ITF Mount Gambier, Australia	Hard	(Croatia) Maja Murić	(Australia) Annabel Ellwood (Australia) Kirrily Sharpe	4–6, 1–6
Loss	15.	18 March 1996	Reims, France	Hard (i)	(Australia) Siobhan Drake-Brockman	(Italy) Giulia Casoni (Italy) Flora Perfetti	3–6, 6–4, 0–6
Loss	16.	15 March 1999	Ortisei, Italy	Hard (i)	(Italy) Maria Elena Camerin	(United States) Dawn Buth (United States) Rebecca Jensen	2–6, 6–3, 6–7
Loss	17.	12 April 1996	Cagnes-sur-Mer, France	Hard	(Australia) Louise Pleming	(United Kingdom) Karen Cross (Australia) Amanda Grahame	4–6, 6–3, 6–7
