= Eva Krapl =

Swiss tennis player

- Country (sports): Switzerland
- Born: 16 January 1966 (age 60) Brno, Czechoslovakia
- Height: 1.80 m (5 ft 11 in)
- Turned pro: 1983
- Retired: 1991
- Plays: Right-handed (two-handed backhand)
- Prize money: $129,235

Singles
- Career record: 74 – 100
- Career titles: 0 ITF, 0 WTA
- Highest ranking: No. 94 (3 July 1989)

Grand Slam singles results
- Australian Open: 3R (1988)
- French Open: 3R (1987)
- Wimbledon: 1R (1988,1989)
- US Open: 1R (1986,1987,1989)

Doubles
- Career record: 28 – 68
- Career titles: 0 ITF, 0 WTA
- Highest ranking: No. 94 (7 May 1990)

Grand Slam doubles results
- Australian Open: 2R (1988,1990)
- French Open: 1R (1986,1990)
- Wimbledon: 1R (1988,1990)
- US Open: 1R (1986)

Eva Krapl (January 16, 1966) is a former professional tennis player from Switzerland, active from 1987 to 1990.

Krapl currently works as a coach in the TIF Academy in Switzerland.

== ITF Circuit finals ==
$100,000 tournaments
$75,000 tournaments
$50,000 tournaments
$25,000 tournaments
$10,000 tournaments

=== Singles: 1 (0–1) ===
Result	No.	Date	Tournament	Surface	Opponent	Score
Loss	1.	9 September 1985	Manhasset, United States	Clay	(Italy) Laura Golarsa	6–7, 2–6

=== Doubles: 2 (0–2) ===
$100,000 tournaments
$75,000 tournaments
$50,000 tournaments
$25,000 tournaments
$10,000 tournaments

Result	No.	Date	Tournament	Surface	Partner	Opponents	Score
Loss	1.	30 March 1987	Limoges, France	Clay	(Switzerland) Céline Cohen	(France) Isabelle Demongeot (France) Nathalie Tauziat	5–7, 2–6
Loss	2.	23 October 1989	Burgdorf, Switzerland	Carpet (i)	(Switzerland) Sandrine Jaquet	(Soviet Union) Elena Bryukhovets (Soviet Union) Eugenia Maniokova	4–6, 2–6
