= 1989 Wimbledon Championships – Men's singles qualifying =

Men's singles qualifying
- 1989 Wimbledon Championships

Events
Singles	men	women		boys	girls
Doubles	men	women	mixed	boys	girls
WC Singles	men	women	quad
WC Doubles	men	women	quad
Legends	men	women	seniors

Qualification
Singles	men	women
Doubles	men	women	mixed
- Wimbledon Championships

Players and pairs who neither have high enough rankings nor receive wild cards may participate in a qualifying tournament held one week before the annual Wimbledon Tennis Championships.

== Seeds ==
1. (France) Éric Winogradsky (second round)
2. (United States) Dan Cassidy (first round)
3. (United States) Sammy Giammalva (qualified)
4. (United States) Matt Anger (qualifying competition, lucky loser)
5. (Canada) Martin Laurendeau (qualified)
6. (India) Zeeshan Ali (qualified)
7. (Brazil) Danilo Marcelino (qualifying competition)
8. (Canada) Grant Connell (second round)
9. (West Germany) Udo Riglewski (first round)
10. (Sweden) Niclas Kroon (second round)
11. (Australia) Broderick Dyke (second round)
12. (Sweden) Nicklas Kulti (qualifying competition)
13. (United States) Kelly Jones (qualified)
14. (Soviet Union) Andrei Olhovskiy (first round)
15. (Sweden) Peter Nyborg (first round)
16. (United States) Joey Rive (qualified)
17. (France) Guillaume Raoux (first round)
18. (Czechoslovakia) Cyril Suk (second round)
19. (Sweden) Tobias Svantesson (qualifying competition)
20. n/a
21. (Chile) Ricardo Acuña (first round)
22. (United States) Kent Kinnear (qualifying competition)
23. (United States) Bret Garnett (qualified)
24. (South Africa) Michael Robertson (qualified)
25. (France) Philippe Pech (first round)
26. (New Zealand) Steve Guy (qualifying competition)
27. (Brazil) Alexandre Hocevar (first round)
28. (Brazil) Fernando Roese (qualifying competition)
29. (Australia) Peter Doohan (second round)
30. (United States) Scott Warner (qualified)
31. (West Germany) Patrick Baur (qualified)
32. (India) Srinivasan Vasudevan (first round)

== Qualifiers ==
1. (West Germany) Patrick Baur
2. (Sweden) Ronnie Båthman
3. (United States) Sammy Giammalva
4. (United States) Scott Warner
5. (Canada) Martin Laurendeau
6. (India) Zeeshan Ali
7. (United States) Greg Holmes
8. (United States) Bill Scanlon
9. (United States) Bret Garnett
10. (South Africa) Michael Robertson
11. (Australia) Todd Woodbridge
12. (United States) Bryan Shelton
13. (United States) Kelly Jones
14. (Sweden) Henrik Holm
15. (United Kingdom) Nick Fulwood
16. (United States) Joey Rive

== Lucky loser ==
1. (United States) Matt Anger

== Qualifying draw ==
=== First qualifier ===
First round
1	(France) Éric Winogradsky	6	7
WC	(United Kingdom) Gary Engleman	3	5
(United States) Jonathan Stark	6	4	6
(United States) Mike Bauer	3	6	4
(Australia) Brett Custer	3	6^{1}
(South Africa) Royce Deppe	6	7^{7}
(United States) Steve DeVries	0	5
31	(West Germany) Patrick Baur	6	7

Second round
1	(France) Éric Winogradsky	3	3
(United States) Jonathan Stark	6	6
(South Africa) Royce Deppe	6^{6}	7^{7}	6
31	(West Germany) Patrick Baur	7^{8}	6^{5}	8

Qualifying competition
(United States) Jonathan Stark	6^{10}	3	2
31	(West Germany) Patrick Baur	7^{12}	6	6

=== Second qualifier ===
First round
2	(United States) Dan Cassidy	6	4	1
(Sweden) Ronnie Båthman	1	6	6
(Nigeria) Sadiq Abdullahi	1	0
(United States) Charles Merzbacher	6	6
(France) Stéphane Grenier	7^{7}	6
(Brazil) Jaime Oncins	6^{4}	4
(United States) John Letts	6	6
32	(India) Srinivasan Vasudevan	2	1

Second round
(Sweden) Ronnie Båthman	6	6
(United States) Charles Merzbacher	4	1
(France) Stéphane Grenier	6	6
(United States) John Letts	2	2

Qualifying competition
(Sweden) Ronnie Båthman	6	7^{7}	6
(France) Stéphane Grenier	4	6^{2}	3

=== Third qualifier ===
First round
3	(United States) Sammy Giammalva	6	6
(Australia) Peter Carter	3	2
(South Africa) Byron Talbot	6	7
(South Africa) Tertius Reynders	4	5
(United Kingdom) Danny Sapsford	7	6^{2}	3
(West Germany) Andreas Maurer	5	7^{7}	6
(South Africa) Grant Saacks	3	4
29	(Australia) Peter Doohan	6	6

Second round
3	(United States) Sammy Giammalva	3	6	10
(South Africa) Byron Talbot	6	2	8
(West Germany) Andreas Maurer	6	6
29	(Australia) Peter Doohan	4	3

Qualifying competition
3	(United States) Sammy Giammalva	6	3	6^{3}	6	7
(West Germany) Andreas Maurer	4	6	7^{7}	3	5

=== Fourth qualifier ===
First round
4	(United States) Matt Anger	6^{5}	7^{7}	6
(Brazil) Mauro Menezes	7^{7}	6^{5}	2
(West Germany) Michael Kupferschmid	1	6^{6}
(Denmark) Morten Christensen	6	7^{8}
(West Germany) Markus Zoecke	6	6
WC	(United Kingdom) Jonathan Southcombe	3	4
(Brazil) Dácio Campos	3	2
30	(United States) Scott Warner	6	6

Second round
4	(United States) Matt Anger	6	6
(Denmark) Morten Christensen	2	2
(West Germany) Markus Zoecke	6	6^{0}	8
30	(United States) Scott Warner	3	7^{7}	10

Qualifying competition
4	(United States) Matt Anger	5	6	6^{2}	6	26
30	(United States) Scott Warner	7	1	7^{7}	3	28

=== Fifth qualifier ===
First round
5	(Canada) Martin Laurendeau	6	3	6
(West Germany) Arne Thoms	4	6	4
(Australia) Jamie Morgan	5	6	4
(Brazil) José Daher	7	3	6
(Israel) Amit Naor	4	4
(Japan) Tsuyoshi Fukui	6	6
(West Germany) Andreas Lesch	4	4
28	(Brazil) Fernando Roese	6	6

Second round
5	(Canada) Martin Laurendeau	5	6	6
(Brazil) José Daher	7	2	3
(Japan) Tsuyoshi Fukui	0	3
28	(Brazil) Fernando Roese	6	6

Qualifying competition
5	(Canada) Martin Laurendeau	6^{2}	6	6	6
28	(Brazil) Fernando Roese	7^{7}	4	4	4

=== Sixth qualifier ===
First round
6	(India) Zeeshan Ali	6	7^{7}
(France) Olivier Soules	1	6^{5}
(United Kingdom) David Felgate	1	2
(United States) Todd Nelson	6	6
(United Kingdom) Steve Shaw	6	1	6
(South Africa) Wayne Ferreira	4	6	3
(France) Stéphane Sansoni	6	6
27	(Brazil) Alexandre Hocevar	3	1

Second round
6	(India) Zeeshan Ali	3	6	9
(United States) Todd Nelson	6	1	7
(United Kingdom) Steve Shaw	6	6
(France) Stéphane Sansoni	3	4

Qualifying competition
6	(India) Zeeshan Ali	6	7^{7}	2	6
(United Kingdom) Steve Shaw	3	6^{4}	6	3

=== Seventh qualifier ===
First round
7	(Brazil) Danilo Marcelino	7^{7}	7
(Australia) Johan Anderson	6^{5}	5
(Netherlands) Johan Vekemans	6	6
(Australia) Russell Barlow	3	4
(United States) Greg Holmes	6	6
(United States) Tom Mercer	2	2
(South Africa) Stefan Kruger	6	4	6
25	(France) Philippe Pech	2	6	3

Second round
7	(Brazil) Danilo Marcelino	7^{7}	7^{7}
(Netherlands) Johan Vekemans	6^{2}	6^{4}
(United States) Greg Holmes	6	6
(South Africa) Stefan Kruger	4	1

Qualifying competition
7	(Brazil) Danilo Marcelino	6^{7}	7^{7}	6^{8}	5
(United States) Greg Holmes	7^{9}	6^{3}	7^{10}	7

=== Eighth qualifier ===
First round
8	(Canada) Grant Connell	6	6
(United States) Paul Koscielski	3	4
WC	(United Kingdom) Andrew Foster	2	4
(United States) Bill Scanlon	6	6
(United Kingdom) Ulli Nganga	6	6
WC	(Australia) Laurie Warder	2	4
(United States) Marc Flur	4	4
26	(New Zealand) Steve Guy	6	6

Second round
8	(Canada) Grant Connell	6^{4}	6^{8}
(United States) Bill Scanlon	7^{7}	7^{10}
(United Kingdom) Ulli Nganga	6^{9}	2
26	(New Zealand) Steve Guy	7^{11}	6

Qualifying competition
(United States) Bill Scanlon	6	7	6
26	(New Zealand) Steve Guy	2	5	2

=== Ninth qualifier ===
First round
9	(West Germany) Udo Riglewski	3	7^{8}	3
(South Africa) Charles Honey	6	6^{6}	6
(Kenya) Paul Wekesa	4	7	4
(United States) Brad Pearce	6	5	6
(Israel) Boaz Merenstein	1	2
(United States) Mel Purcell	6	6
(United States) Bruce Man-Son-Hing	1	6^{5}
23	(United States) Bret Garnett	6	7^{7}

Second round
(South Africa) Charles Honey	6	6
(United States) Brad Pearce	4	3
(United States) Mel Purcell	4	4
23	(United States) Bret Garnett	6	6

Qualifying competition
(South Africa) Charles Honey	4	4	4
23	(United States) Bret Garnett	6	6	6

=== Tenth qualifier ===
First round
10	(Sweden) Niclas Kroon	6	7^{7}
(United States) Arkie Engle	2	6^{4}
(Australia) Gavin Pfitzner	4	0
(United States) Rick Leach	6	6
(The Bahamas) Mark Knowles	3	6	4
WC	(United Kingdom) Daniel Bishop	6	2	6
(West Germany) Heiner Moraing	3	4
24	(South Africa) Michael Robertson	6	6

Second round
10	(Sweden) Niclas Kroon	6	1	2
(United States) Rick Leach	3	6	6
WC	(United Kingdom) Daniel Bishop	5	2
24	(South Africa) Michael Robertson	7	6

Qualifying competition
(United States) Rick Leach	6^{2}	7^{7}	3	4
24	(South Africa) Michael Robertson	7^{7}	6^{2}	6	6

=== Eleventh qualifier ===
First round
11	(Australia) Broderick Dyke	7^{7}	6
(United States) Doug Flach	6^{4}	4
(Australia) John Marinov	6	4	4
(Australia) Todd Woodbridge	3	6	6
(Italy) Alberto Paris	6^{4}	1^{r}
(Netherlands) Jan-Willem Lodder	7^{7}	4
(United States) John Sobel	5	6	2
22	(United States) Kent Kinnear	7	3	6

Second round
11	(Australia) Broderick Dyke	4	4
(Australia) Todd Woodbridge	6	6
(Netherlands) Jan-Willem Lodder	4	6	1
22	(United States) Kent Kinnear	6	4	6

Qualifying competition
(Australia) Todd Woodbridge	6	6	7^{11}
22	(United States) Kent Kinnear	4	4	6^{9}

=== Twelfth qualifier ===
First round
12	(Sweden) Nicklas Kulti	6	6
(Brazil) Nelson Aerts	2	2
(France) Arnaud Boetsch	6	6
(South Africa) Andrew Burrow	0	4
(West Germany) Gerald Marzenell	6	6
(South Africa) Denys Maasdorp	4	4
(United States) Bryan Shelton	6	7^{7}
21	(Chile) Ricardo Acuña	4	6^{4}

Second round
12	(Sweden) Nicklas Kulti	6	7^{7}
(France) Arnaud Boetsch	2	6^{3}
(West Germany) Gerald Marzenell	3	1
(United States) Bryan Shelton	6	6

Qualifying competition
12	(Sweden) Nicklas Kulti	3	4	6	7^{7}	1
(United States) Bryan Shelton	6	6	4	6^{3}	6

=== Thirteenth qualifier ===
First round
13	(United States) Kelly Jones	6	7^{7}
WC	(United Kingdom) Paul Hand	4	6^{4}
(United States) Greg Van Emburgh	4	7	6
(Belgium) Libor Pimek	6	5	3
WC	(United Kingdom) David Ison	1	6	1
(United States) Patrick McEnroe	6	3	6
WC	(United Kingdom) Jeffrey Hunter	7	3	9
19	(Sweden) Tobias Svantesson	5	6	11

Second round
13	(United States) Kelly Jones	5	6	6
(United States) Greg Van Emburgh	7	3	1
(United States) Patrick McEnroe	5	3
19	(Sweden) Tobias Svantesson	7	6

Qualifying competition
13	(United States) Kelly Jones	6	7^{7}	7^{12}
19	(Sweden) Tobias Svantesson	4	6^{1}	7^{10}

=== Fourteenth qualifier ===
First round
14	(Soviet Union) Andrei Olhovskiy	6^{2}	6	5
(Mexico) Luis Herrera	7^{7}	2	7
(Sweden) Henrik Holm	7	3	6
(Italy) Ugo Colombini	5	6	1
(Republic of Ireland) Peter Wright	6	6
WC	(United Kingdom) Darren Kirk	3	3
(Mexico) Stefan Dallwitz	6^{2}	2
Alt	(Romania) Mihnea-Ion Năstase	7^{7}	6

Second round
(Mexico) Luis Herrera	3	6^{2}
(Sweden) Henrik Holm	6	7^{7}
(Republic of Ireland) Peter Wright	6	6^{6}	4
Alt	(Romania) Mihnea-Ion Năstase	4	7^{8}	6

Qualifying competition
(Sweden) Henrik Holm	7^{7}	4	7^{7}	6
Alt	(Romania) Mihnea-Ion Năstase	6^{2}	6	6^{4}	4

=== Fifteenth qualifier ===
First round
15	(Sweden) Peter Nyborg	4	4
(United States) Luke Jensen	6	6
(United States) Peter Palandjian	6^{4}	5
(Australia) David Macpherson	7^{7}	6
(South Africa) Lan Bale	2	3
(United Kingdom) Nick Fulwood	6	6
(France) Fabrice Santoro	3	6	2
18	(Czechoslovakia) Cyril Suk	6	3	6

Second round
(United States) Luke Jensen	4	3
(Australia) David Macpherson	6	6
(United Kingdom) Nick Fulwood	6	3	6
18	(Czechoslovakia) Cyril Suk	1	6	3

Qualifying competition
(Australia) David Macpherson	6	1	7^{8}	3	4
(United Kingdom) Nick Fulwood	4	6	6^{6}	6	6

=== Sixteenth qualifier ===
First round
16	(United States) Joey Rive	6	7
(South Africa) Kevin Moir	2	5
(United States) Brian Page	6	7^{7}
(United States) Kenny Thorne	2	6^{4}
(United States) Tim Pawsat	2	7	4
(United States) Jeff Klaparda	6	5	6
(Australia) Steve Furlong	6	1	6
17	(France) Guillaume Raoux	3	6	3

Second round
16	(United States) Joey Rive	6	6
(United States) Brian Page	4	4
(United States) Jeff Klaparda	4	2
(Australia) Steve Furlong	6	6

Qualifying competition
16	(United States) Joey Rive	6	6	6
(Australia) Steve Furlong	4	2	2
