= 1989 Wimbledon Championships – Boys' doubles =

Boys' doubles
- 1989 Wimbledon Championships

Final
- Champions: (United States) Jared Palmer (United States) Jonathan Stark
- Runners-up: (South Africa) John-Laffnie de Jager (South Africa) Wayne Ferreira
- Score: 7–6^{(7–4)}, 7–6^{(7–2)}

Events
Singles	men	women		boys	girls
Doubles	men	women	mixed	boys	girls
WC Singles	men	women	quad
WC Doubles	men	women	quad
Legends	men	women	seniors
← 1988 ·	Wimbledon Championships	· 1990 →

Jason Stoltenberg and Todd Woodbridge were the two-time defending champions, but Stoltenberg did not compete. Woodbridge played with Johan Anderson but lost in the semifinals to John-Laffnie de Jager and Wayne Ferreira.

Jared Palmer and Jonathan Stark defeated de Jager and Ferreira in the final, 7–6^{(7–4)}, 7–6^{(7–2)} to win the boys' doubles tennis title at the 1989 Wimbledon Championships.

== Seeds ==
1. (Australia) Johan Anderson / (Australia) Todd Woodbridge (semifinals)
2. (United States) Jared Palmer / (United States) Jonathan Stark (champions)
3. (Sweden) Ola Kristiansson / (Sweden) Nicklas Kulti (quarterfinals)
4. (South Africa) John-Laffnie de Jager / (South Africa) Wayne Ferreira (final)
5. (Australia) Jamie Morgan / (Australia) Bret Richardson (quarterfinals)
6. (Czechoslovakia) Martin Damm / (Czechoslovakia) David Rikl (semifinals)
7. (Mexico) Pedro Alatorre / (The Bahamas) Mark Knowles (quarterfinals)
8. (Czechoslovakia) Jan Kodeš / (Argentina) Martin Stringari (second round)

== Draw ==
=== Key ===
- Q = Qualifier
- WC = Wild card
- LL = Lucky loser
- Alt = Alternate
- SE = Special exempt
- PR = Protected ranking
- ITF = ITF entry
- JE = Junior exempt
- w/o = Walkover
- r = Retired
- d = Defaulted
- SR = Special ranking

=== Finals ===
Semifinals
1	(Australia) Johan Anderson (Australia) Todd Woodbridge	4	7	4
4	(South Africa) John-Laffnie de Jager (South Africa) Wayne Ferreira	6	5	6
6	(Czechoslovakia) Martin Damm (Czechoslovakia) David Rikl	3	4
2	(United States) Jared Palmer (United States) Jonathan Stark	6	6

Final
4	(South Africa) John-Laffnie de Jager (South Africa) Wayne Ferreira	6^{4}	6^{2}
2	(United States) Jared Palmer (United States) Jonathan Stark	7^{7}	7^{7}

=== Top half ===
First round
1	(Australia) Johan Anderson (Australia) Todd Woodbridge	7	6
(Mexico) Oliver Fernández (Venezuela) Maurice Ruah	5	4
(South Africa) Clinton Marsh (South Africa) Marcos Ondruska	6	7
(United Kingdom) Philip Gainford (Zimbabwe) Alan Hounsell	2	5
(India) Leander Paes (New Zealand) Troy Tipene	6	6
(Norway) Fredrik Bach (Finland) Juhana Pohjola	3	2
(United Kingdom) David Collins (United Kingdom) Simon Cornish	6	6	7
8	(Czechoslovakia) Jan Kodeš (Argentina) Martin Stringari	3	7	9
4	(South Africa) John-Laffnie de Jager (South Africa) Wayne Ferreira	6	6
(Brazil) Eduardo Barbosa (Egypt) Tamer El-Sawy	1	3
(United Kingdom) Richard Holden (United Kingdom) David Ireland	4	3
(West Germany) Michael Bayh (West Germany) Arne Thoms	6	6
(Poland) Bartłomiej Dąbrowski (Haiti) Bertrand Madsen	6	6	8
(United Kingdom) Andrew Foster (United Kingdom) Jonathan Haycock	3	7	10
(Japan) Hidehiko Tanizawa (Japan) Yasufumi Yamamoto	3	4
5	(Australia) Jamie Morgan (Australia) Bret Richardson	6	6

Second round
1	(Australia) J Anderson (Australia) T Woodbridge
(South Africa) C Marsh (South Africa) M Ondruska
(India) L Paes (New Zealand) T Tipene	4	6	7
8	(Czechoslovakia) J Kodeš (Argentina) M Stringari	6	1	5
4	(South Africa) J-L de Jager (South Africa) W Ferreira	6	4	6
(West Germany) M Bayh (West Germany) A Thoms	4	6	4
(United Kingdom) A Foster (United Kingdom) J Haycock	4	4
5	(Australia) J Morgan (Australia) B Richardson	6	6

Quarterfinals
1	(Australia) J Anderson (Australia) T Woodbridge	6	7
(India) Leander Paes (New Zealand) Troy Tipene	1	5
4	(South Africa) J-L de Jager (South Africa) W Ferreira	7^{7}	6
5	(Australia) J Morgan (Australia) B Richardson	6^{4}	2

Semifinals
1	(Australia) J Anderson (Australia) T Woodbridge	4	7	4
4	(South Africa) J-L de Jager (South Africa) W Ferreira	6	5	6

=== Bottom half ===
First round
6	(Czechoslovakia) Martin Damm (Czechoslovakia) David Rikl	6	7
(Switzerland) Patrick Baumeler (Switzerland) Valentin Frieden	1	6
(Thailand) Thanakorn Duangmanee (Hong Kong) Ray Ng	2	3
(Socialist Federal Republic of Yugoslavia) Iztok Božič (Soviet Union) Sergei Pospelov	6	6
(United Kingdom) John Barton (United Kingdom) David Draper	7	4	8
(Brazil) Carlos Engel (Brazil) Fernando Meligeni	6	6	10
(New Zealand) Alistair Hunt (New Zealand) Michael Zoricich	4	4
3	(Sweden) Ola Kristiansson (Sweden) Nicklas Kulti	6	6
7	(Mexico) Pedro Alatorre (The Bahamas) Mark Knowles	7	7
(United States) Brian MacPhie (India) Rohit Rajpal	6	6
(Japan) Kentaro Masuda (South Korea) Park Chang-hee	3	5
(Chile) Marcelo Achondo (Chile) Óscar Bustos	6	7
(United Kingdom) David Harris (United Kingdom) Jonathan Venison	3	6	5
(Belgium) Filip Dewulf (Belgium) Tom Vanhoudt	6	3	7
(Spain) Jorge Vila (Israel) Ohad Weinberg	6	6
2	(United States) Jared Palmer (United States) Jonathan Stark	7	7

Second round
6	(Czechoslovakia) M Damm (Czechoslovakia) D Rikl	1	6	6
(Socialist Federal Republic of Yugoslavia) I Božič (Soviet Union) S Pospelov	6	1	3
(Brazil) C Engel (Brazil) F Meligeni	2	1
3	(Sweden) O Kristiansson (Sweden) N Kulti	6	6
7	(Mexico) P Alatorre (The Bahamas) M Knowles	7^{7}	6
(Chile) M Achondo (Chile) Ó Bustos	6^{5}	2
(Belgium) F Dewulf (Belgium) T Vanhoudt	2	3
2	(United States) J Palmer (United States) J Stark	6	6

Quarterfinals
6	(Czechoslovakia) M Damm (Czechoslovakia) D Rikl	7^{9}	6
3	(Sweden) O Kristiansson (Sweden) N Kulti	6^{7}	1
7	(Mexico) P Alatorre (The Bahamas) M Knowles	1	2
2	(United States) J Palmer (United States) J Stark	6	6

Semifinals
6	(Czechoslovakia) M Damm (Czechoslovakia) D Rikl	3	4
2	(United States) J Palmer (United States) J Stark	6	6
