= 1989 Wimbledon Championships – Boys' singles =

Boys' singles
- 1989 Wimbledon Championships

Final
- Champion: (Sweden) Nicklas Kulti
- Runner-up: (Australia) Todd Woodbridge
- Score: 6–4, 6–3

Events
Singles	men	women		boys	girls
Doubles	men	women	mixed	boys	girls
WC Singles	men	women	quad
WC Doubles	men	women	quad
Legends	men	women	seniors
← 1988 ·	Wimbledon Championships	· 1990 →

Nicklas Kulti defeated Todd Woodbridge in the final, 6–4, 6–3 to win the boys' singles tennis title at the 1989 Wimbledon Championships.

== Seeds ==
1. (Sweden) Nicklas Kulti (champion)
2. (Australia) Todd Woodbridge (final)
3. (Australia) Johan Anderson (quarterfinals)
4. (Italy) Stefano Pescosolido (first round)
5. (South Africa) Wayne Ferreira (semifinals)
6. (United States) Jared Palmer (quarterfinals)
7. (Australia) Jamie Morgan (third round)
8. (France) Fabrice Santoro (third round)
9. (West Germany) Arne Thoms (quarterfinals)
10. (Mexico) Luis Herrera (quarterfinals)
11. (United States) Jonathan Stark (third round)
12. (The Bahamas) Mark Knowles (second round)
13. (Argentina) Martin Stringari (first round)
14. (Brazil) Fernando Meligeni (second round)
15. (Czechoslovakia) David Rikl (second round)
16. (Czechoslovakia) Martin Damm (second round)

Click on the seed number of a player to go to their draw section.

== Draw ==
=== Key ===
- Q = Qualifier
- WC = Wild card
- LL = Lucky loser
- Alt = Alternate
- SE = Special exempt
- PR = Protected ranking
- ITF = ITF entry
- JE = Junior exempt
- w/o = Walkover
- r = Retired
- d = Defaulted
- SR = Special ranking

=== Finals ===
Quarterfinals
1	(Sweden) Nicklas Kulti	7^{7}	6
9	(West Germany) Arne Thoms	6^{1}	4
3	(Australia) Johan Anderson	2	2
5	(South Africa) Wayne Ferreira	6	6
6	(United States) Jared Palmer	5	6	1
(United States) Brian MacPhie	7	3	6
10	(Mexico) Luis Herrera	1	7^{7}	2
2	(Australia) Todd Woodbridge	6	6^{4}	6

Semifinals
1	(Sweden) Nicklas Kulti	7^{7}	7^{7}
5	(South Africa) Wayne Ferreira	6^{4}	6^{2}
(United States) Brian MacPhie	6	1	6
2	(Australia) Todd Woodbridge	4	6	8

Final
1	(Sweden) Nicklas Kulti	6	6
2	(Australia) Todd Woodbridge	4	3

=== Top half ===
==== Section 1 ====
First round
1	(Sweden) Nicklas Kulti	6	6
(New Zealand) Troy Tipene	4	2
(Haiti) Bertrand Madsen	3	3
(Sweden) Ola Kristiansson	6	6
(Australia) Bret Richardson	6	6
(Costa Rica) Carlos Paez	0	3
(South Africa) Clinton Marsh	4	6
15	(Czechoslovakia) David Rikl	6	7
9	(West Germany) Arne Thoms	6	6
(Hong Kong) Ray Ng	4	3
(Norway) Fredrik Bach	6	4
(Switzerland) Valentin Frieden	7	6
(United Kingdom) David Ireland	7	6
(Japan) Hidehiko Tanizawa	5	4
(West Germany) Michael Bayh	2	6
8	(France) Fabrice Santoro	6	7

Second round
1	(Sweden) N Kulti	7	6
(Sweden) O Kristiansson	6	3
(Australia) B Richardson	6	7
15	(Czechoslovakia) D Rikl	4	5
9	(West Germany) A Thoms	6	6
(Switzerland) V Frieden	2	4
(United Kingdom) D Ireland	4	2
8	(France) F Santoro	6	6

Third round
1	(Sweden) N Kulti	6	6
(Australia) B Richardson	2	4
9	(West Germany) A Thoms	6	6
8	(France) F Santoro	3	2

Quarterfinals
1	(Sweden) N Kulti	7^{7}	6
9	(West Germany) A Thoms	6^{1}	4

==== Section 2 ====
First round
3	(Australia) Johan Anderson	6	6
(Chile) Marcelo Achondo	3	2
(Switzerland) Patrick Baumeler	2	2
(United Kingdom) Jonathan Haycock	6	6
(Finland) Juhana Pohjola	4	6	5
(Thailand) Thanakorn Duangmanee	6	4	7
(Venezuela) Maurice Ruah	7	6
13	(Argentina) Martin Stringari	6	3
11	(United States) Jonathan Stark	6	6
(Mexico) Pedro Alatorre	1	4
(Zimbabwe) Alan Hounsell	2	4
(Soviet Union) Sergei Pospelov	6	6
(United Kingdom) John Barton	6	5	6
(Socialist Federal Republic of Yugoslavia) Iztok Božič	4	7	1
(Belgium) Filip Dewulf	3	4
5	(South Africa) Wayne Ferreira	6	6

Second round
3	(Australia) J Anderson	6	6
(United Kingdom) J Haycock	4	3
(Thailand) T Duangmanee	1	0
(Venezuela) M Ruah	6	6
11	(United States) J Stark	6	6
(Soviet Union) S Pospelov	4	2
(United Kingdom) J Barton	2	3
5	(South Africa) W Ferreira	6	6

Third round
3	(Australia) J Anderson	6	7^{7}
(Venezuela) M Ruah	3	6^{5}
11	(United States) J Stark	6	6^{5}	3
5	(South Africa) W Ferreira	4	7^{7}	6

Quarterfinals
3	(Australia) J Anderson	2	2
5	(South Africa) W Ferreira	6	6

=== Bottom half ===
==== Section 3 ====
First round
6	(United States) Jared Palmer	6	3	7
(South Africa) Marcos Ondruska	3	6	5
(United Kingdom) David Draper	4	1
(Mexico) Oliver Fernández	6	6
(United Kingdom) David Harris	3	6	3
(Chile) Óscar Bustos	6	3	6
(South Korea) Park Chang-hee	2	5
12	(The Bahamas) Mark Knowles	6	7
14	(Brazil) Fernando Meligeni	6	6
(Philippines) Juancho Macaraeg	3	2
(Spain) Germán López	7	6
(Poland) Bartłomiej Dąbrowski	6	3
(Brazil) Eduardo Barbosa	6	1	3
(Czechoslovakia) Jan Kodeš	3	6	6
(United States) Brian MacPhie	7	4	6
4	(Italy) Stefano Pescosolido	5	6	2

Second round
6	(United States) J Palmer	4	7	8
(Mexico) O Fernández	6	5	6
(Chile) Ó Bustos	2	6	6
12	(The Bahamas) M Knowles	6	3	4
14	(Brazil) F Meligeni	5	6
(Spain) G López	7	7
(Czechoslovakia) J Kodeš	2	1
(United States) B MacPhie	6	6

Third round
6	(United States) J Palmer	6	6
(Chile) Ó Bustos	3	2
(Spain) G López	6^{2}	2
(United States) B MacPhie	7^{7}	6

Quarterfinals
6	(United States) J Palmer	5	6	1
(United States) B MacPhie	7	3	6

==== Section 4 ====
First round
7	(Australia) Jamie Morgan	6	7
(India) Rohit Rajpal	3	6
(Japan) Kentaro Masuda	6	6
(United Kingdom) Philip Gainford	2	1
(United Kingdom) Andrew Foster	6	6
(Paraguay) Rubén Alvarenga	1	2
(Belgium) Tom Vanhoudt	0	1
10	(Mexico) Luis Herrera	6	6
16	(Czechoslovakia) Martin Damm	2	6	6
(Spain) Jorge Vila	6	3	2
(Egypt) Tamer El-Sawy	7	6
(Japan) Yasufumi Yamamoto	6	5
(India) Leander Paes	3	6
(Israel) Ohad Weinberg	6	7
(Brazil) Carlos Engel	6	2
2	(Australia) Todd Woodbridge	7	6

Second round
7	(Australia) J Morgan	7	6
(Japan) K Masuda	5	4
(United Kingdom) A Foster	4	2
10	(Mexico) L Herrera	6	6
16	(Czechoslovakia) M Damm	2	2
(Egypt) T El-Sawy	6	6
(Israel) O Weinberg	2	1
2	(Australia) T Woodbridge	6	6

Third round
7	(Australia) J Morgan	2	4
10	(Mexico) L Herrera	6	6
(Egypt) T El-Sawy	2	3
2	(Australia) T Woodbridge	6	6

Quarterfinals
10	(Mexico) L Herrera	1	7^{7}	2
2	(Australia) T Woodbridge	6	6^{4}	6
