= 1989 Wimbledon Championships – Girls' doubles =

Girls' doubles
- 1989 Wimbledon Championships

Final
- Champions: (United States) Jennifer Capriati (United States) Meredith McGrath
- Runners-up: (Czechoslovakia) Andrea Strnadová (Czechoslovakia) Eva Švíglerová
- Score: 6–4, 6–2

Events
Singles	men	women		boys	girls
Doubles	men	women	mixed	boys	girls
WC Singles	men	women	quad
WC Doubles	men	women	quad
Legends	men	women	seniors
- Wimbledon Championships

Jennifer Capriati and Meredith McGrath defeated Andrea Strnadová and Eva Švíglerová in the final, 6–4, 6–2 to win the girls' doubles tennis title at the 1989 Wimbledon Championships.

== Seeds ==
1. (United States) Carrie Cunningham / (United States) Kim Kessaris (first round)
2. (United States) Jennifer Capriati / (United States) Meredith McGrath (champions)
3. (Czechoslovakia) Andrea Strnadová / (Czechoslovakia) Eva Švíglerová (final)
4. (Australia) Kristin Godridge / (Australia) Kirrily Sharpe (semifinals)
5. (Italy) Cathy Caverzasio / (Italy) Silvia Farina (quarterfinals)
6. (South Africa) Michelle Anderson / (South Africa) Amanda Coetzer (quarterfinals)
7. (Australia) Kerry-Anne Guse / (Australia) Nicole Pratt (quarterfinals)
8. (United Kingdom) Sam Smith / (Argentina) Cristina Tessi (quarterfinals)

== Draw ==
Key

- Q = Qualifier
- WC = Wild card
- LL = Lucky loser
- Alt = Alternate
- ITF = ITF entry
- PR = Protected ranking
- SR = Special ranking
- SE = Special exempt
- JE = Junior exempt
- JR = Junior Accelerator Programme entrant
- CO = College Accelerator Programme entrant
- NG = Next Gen Accelerator Program entrant
- w/o = Walkover
- r = Retired
- d = Defaulted

=== Finals ===
Semifinals
(Japan) Rika Hiraki (Chinese Taipei) Wang Shi-ting	4	6	1
3	(Czechoslovakia) Andrea Strnadová (Czechoslovakia) Eva Švíglerová	6	4	6
4	(Australia) Kristin Godridge (Australia) Kirrily Sharpe	6	3	3
2	(United States) Jennifer Capriati (United States) Meredith McGrath	3	6	6

Final
3	(Czechoslovakia) Andrea Strnadová (Czechoslovakia) Eva Švíglerová	4	2
2	(United States) Jennifer Capriati (United States) Meredith McGrath	6	6

=== Top half ===
First round
1	(United States) Carrie Cunningham (United States) Kim Kessaris	3	1
(Japan) Rika Hiraki (Chinese Taipei) Wang Shi-ting	6	6
(United Kingdom) Helen Crook (United Kingdom) Barbara Griffiths	5	4
(Venezuela) Elizabeth Nieto (Spain) Silvia Ramón-Cortés	7	6
(Chile) Paula Cabezas (Thailand) Panrasi Dechsupa	0	2
(Belgium) Sophie Dubois (Poland) Katarzyna Teodorowicz	6	6
(Canada) Suzanne Italiano (Canada) Monica Mraz	3	4
7	(Australia) Kerry-Anne Guse (Australia) Nicole Pratt	6	6
3	(Czechoslovakia) Andrea Strnadová (Czechoslovakia) Eva Švíglerová	7	6
(Japan) Naoko Sawamatsu (Japan) Kaoru Shibata	6	4
(United Kingdom) Sarah Bentley (United Kingdom) Michelle Mair	5	6	3
(Republic of Ireland) Gina Niland (Canada) Laura Randmaa	7	3	6
(South Africa) Rikki Gaddie (South Africa) Toni Gaddie	6	6
(United Kingdom) Michelle Oldham (United Kingdom) Shirli-Ann Siddall	2	2
(Switzerland) Dagmar Gruber (Switzerland) Alexandra Rohner	2	1
6	(South Africa) Michelle Anderson (South Africa) Amanda Coetzer	6	6

Second round
(Japan) R Hiraki (Chinese Taipei) S-t Wang	7^{7}	6
(Venezuela) E Nieto (Spain) S Ramón-Cortés	6^{5}	0
(Belgium) S Dubois (Poland) K Teodorowicz	w/o
7	(Australia) K-A Guse (Australia) N Pratt
3	(Czechoslovakia) A Strnadová (Czechoslovakia) E Švíglerová	3	6	6
(Republic of Ireland) G Niland (Canada) L Randmaa	6	0	2
(South Africa) R Gaddie (South Africa) T Gaddie	2	0
(South Africa) M Anderson (South Africa) A Coetzer	6	6

Quarterfinals
(Japan) R Hiraki (Chinese Taipei) S-t Wang	7	6
7	(Australia) K-A Guse (Australia) N Pratt	5	1
3	(Czechoslovakia) A Strnadová (Czechoslovakia) E Švíglerová	6	7
(South Africa) M Anderson (South Africa) A Coetzer	3	5

Semifinals
(Japan) R Hiraki (Chinese Taipei) S-t Wang	4	6	1
3	(Czechoslovakia) A Strnadová (Czechoslovakia) E Švíglerová	6	4	6

=== Bottom half ===
First round
5	(Italy) Cathy Caverzasio (Italy) Silvia Farina	6	6
(United Kingdom) Virginia Humphreys-Davies (United Kingdom) Rachel Viollet	3	1
(Zimbabwe) Lesley Barbour (South Africa) Roanne Walkerley	7	6
(United Kingdom) Andrea Chorlton (Peru) Carla Rodriguez	5	0
(France) Noëlle van Lottum (France) Sandrine Testud	w/o
(Peru) Gianfranca Devercelli (Bolivia) Natasha Villarroel
(Poland) Małgorzata Chmela (Austria) Sandra Reichel	4	4
4	(Australia) Kristin Godridge (Australia) Kirrily Sharpe	6	6
8	(United Kingdom) Sam Smith (Argentina) Cristina Tessi	6	6
(South Korea) Kang Myung-ok (Thailand) Orawan Thampensri	2	1
(Philippines) Sarah Castillejo (New Zealand) Jacqueline Gunthorp	6	4	3
(Japan) Hiroko Hara (Pakistan) Farah Khursheed	3	6	6
(Soviet Union) Natalia Biletskaia (Soviet Union) Svetlana Komleva	6	3	6
(United Kingdom) Victoria Graeme-Barber (United Kingdom) Colette Hall	3	6	0
(West Germany) Anke Huber (West Germany) Barbara Rittner	w/o
2	(United States) Jennifer Capriati (United States) Meredith McGrath

Second round
5	(Italy) C Caverzasio (Italy) S Farina	3	6	6
(Zimbabwe) L Barbour (South Africa) R Walkerley	6	3	2
(Peru) G Devercelli (Bolivia) N Villarroel	w/o
4	(Australia) K Godridge (Australia) K Sharpe
8	(United Kingdom) S Smith (Argentina) C Tessi	6	7^{7}
(Japan) H Hara (Pakistan) F Khursheed	3	6^{3}
(Soviet Union) N Biletskaia (Soviet Union) S Komleva	3	7	2
2	(United States) J Capriati (United States) M McGrath	6	5	6

Quarterfinals
5	(Italy) C Caverzasio (Italy) S Farina	6	5	5
4	(Australia) K Godridge (Australia) K Sharpe	4	7	7
8	(United Kingdom) S Smith (Argentina) C Tessi	2	3
2	(United States) J Capriati (United States) M McGrath	6	6

Semifinals
4	(Australia) K Godridge (Australia) K Sharpe	6	3	3
2	(United States) J Capriati (United States) M McGrath	3	6	6
