= 1989 Wimbledon Championships – Girls' singles =

Girls' singles
- 1989 Wimbledon Championships

Final
- Champion: (Czechoslovakia) Andrea Strnadová
- Runner-up: (United States) Meredith McGrath
- Score: 6–2, 6–3

Events
| Singles | men | women | | boys | girls |
| Doubles | men | women | mixed | boys | girls |
| WC Singles | men | women | quad |
| WC Doubles | men | women | quad |
| Legends | men | women | seniors |
- Wimbledon Championships

Andrea Strnadová defeated Meredith McGrath in the final, 6–2, 6–3 to win the girls' singles tennis title at the 1989 Wimbledon Championships.

== Seeds ==
1. (Australia) Jo-Anne Faull (third round)
2. (United States) Carrie Cunningham (third round)
3. (South Africa) Amanda Coetzer (quarterfinals)
4. (United States) Jennifer Capriati (quarterfinals)
5. (Italy) Cathy Caverzasio (second round)
6. (Australia) Meredith McGrath (final)
7. (Czechoslovakia) Eva Švíglerová (third round)
8. (United States) Kim Kessaris (quarterfinals)
9. (Italy) Silvia Farina (third round)
10. (Argentina) Cristina Tessi (quarterfinals)
11. (United Kingdom) Sam Smith (first round)
12. (Israel) Yael Segal (third round)
13. n/a
14. (France) Sandrine Testud (second round)
15. (South Africa) Michelle Anderson (semifinals)
16. (Japan) Naoko Sawamatsu (semifinals)

Click on the seed number of a player to go to their draw section.

== Draw ==
Key

- Q = Qualifier
- WC = Wild card
- LL = Lucky loser
- Alt = Alternate
- ITF = ITF entry
- PR = Protected ranking
- SR = Special ranking
- SE = Special exempt
- JE = Junior exempt
- JR = Junior Accelerator Programme entrant
- CO = College Accelerator Programme entrant
- NG = Next Gen Accelerator Program entrant
- w/o = Walkover
- r = Retired
- d = Defaulted

=== Finals ===
Quarterfinals
16 | (Japan) Naoko Sawamatsu | 6 | 6
10 | (Argentina) Cristina Tessi | 2 | 1
4 | (United States) Jennifer Capriati | 2 | 7^{7} | 4
(Czechoslovakia) Andrea Strnadová | 6 | 6^{3} | 6
6 | (United States) Meredith McGrath | 7 | 6
3 | (South Africa) Amanda Coetzer | 5 | 3
8 | (United States) Kim Kessaris | 4 | 5
15 | (South Africa) Michelle Anderson | 6 | 7

Semifinals
16 | (Japan) Naoko Sawamatsu | 2 | 2
(Czechoslovakia) Andrea Strnadová | 6 | 6
6 | (United States) Meredith McGrath | 7^{7} | 6
15 | (South Africa) Michelle Anderson | 6^{4} | 1

Final
(Czechoslovakia) Andrea Strnadová | 6 | 6
6 | (United States) Meredith McGrath | 2 | 3

=== Top half ===
==== Section 1 ====
First round
1 | (Australia) Jo-Anne Faull | 6 | 6
(Switzerland) Dagmar Gruber | 0 | 4
(South Africa) Roanne Walkerley | 1 | 6 | 0
(Australia) Kerry-Anne Guse | 6 | 1 | 6
(Thailand) Orawan Thampensri | 2 | 4
(France) Noëlle van Lottum | 6 | 6
(Chinese Taipei) Wang Shi-ting | 3 | 3
16 | (Japan) Naoko Sawamatsu | 6 | 6
10 | (Argentina) Cristina Tessi | 6 | 4 | 6
(Canada) Suzanne Italiano | 1 | 6 | 4
(Japan) Hiroko Hara | 6 | 6 | 6
(Zimbabwe) Lesley Barbour | 3 | 7 | 0
(Pakistan) Farah Khursheed | 3 | 5
(Peru) Carla Rodriguez | 6 | 7
(United Kingdom) Michelle Oldham | 3 | 4
7 | (Czechoslovakia) Eva Švíglerová | 6 | 6

Second round
1 | (Australia) J-A Faull | 2 | 7 | 6
(Australia) K-A Guse | 6 | 5 | 4
(France) N van Lottum | 1 | 2
16 | (Japan) N Sawamatsu | 6 | 6
10 | (Argentina) C Tessi | 6 | 3 | 6
(Japan) H Hara | 1 | 6 | 2
(Peru) C Rodriguez | 2 | 1
7 | (Czechoslovakia) E Švíglerová | 6 | 6

Third round
1 | (Australia) J-A Faull | 5 | 6^{5}
16 | (Japan) N Sawamatsu | 7 | 7^{7}
10 | (Argentina) C Tessi | 7 | 4 | 8
7 | (Czechoslovakia) E Švíglerová | 5 | 6 | 6

Quarterfinals
16 | (Japan) N Sawamatsu | 6 | 6
10 | (Argentina) C Tessi | 2 | 1

==== Section 2 ====
First round
4 | (United States) Jennifer Capriati | 6 | 6
(New Zealand) Jacqueline Gunthorp | 1 | 1
(United Kingdom) Barbara Griffiths | 6 | 2 | 5
(Japan) Kaoru Shibata | 2 | 6 | 7
(Australia) Kirrily Sharpe | 7 | 6 | 6
(United Kingdom) Virginia Humphreys-Davies | 5 | 7 | 1
(Poland) Katarzyna Teodorowicz | 5 | 6 | 3
14 | (France) Sandrine Testud | 7 | 2 | 6
11 | (United Kingdom) Sam Smith | 3 | 6 | 3
(Japan) Rika Hiraki | 6 | 3 | 6
(Czechoslovakia) Andrea Strnadová | 6 | 6
(Belgium) Sophie Dubois | 3 | 2
(Poland) Małgorzata Chmela | 0 | 1
(Canada) Monica Mraz | 6 | 6
(Peru) Gianfranca Devercelli | 2 | 7 | 3
5 | (Italy) Cathy Caverzasio | 6 | 6 | 6

Second round
4 | (United States) J Capriati | 6 | 6
(Japan) K Shibata | 2 | 2
(Australia) K Sharpe | 4 | 6 | 6
14 | (France) S Testud | 6 | 3 | 4
(Japan) R Hiraki | 2 | 3
(Czechoslovakia) A Strnadová | 6 | 6
(Canada) M Mraz | 6 | 6
5 | (Italy) C Caverzasio | 2 | 2

Third round
4 | (United States) J Capriati | 6 | 6
(Australia) K Sharpe | 1 | 2
(Czechoslovakia) A Strnadová | 6 | 6
(Canada) M Mraz | 3 | 1

Quarterfinals
4 | (United States) J Capriati | 2 | 7^{7} | 4
(Czechoslovakia) A Strnadová | 6 | 6^{3} | 6

=== Bottom half ===
==== Section 3 ====
First round
6 | (United States) Meredith McGrath | 6 | 6
(South Africa) Toni Gaddie | 1 | 2
(South Africa) Rikki Gaddie | 6 | 6
(Bolivia) Natasha Villarroel | 0 | 1
(South Korea) Kang Myung-ok | 2 | 1
(Spain) Silvia Ramón-Cortés | 6 | 6
(United Kingdom) Colette Hall | 0 | 5
12 | (Israel) Yael Segal | 6 | 7
(United Kingdom) Michelle Mair | 4 | 3
(Venezuela) Elizabeth Nieto | 6 | 6
(Thailand) Panrasi Dechsupa | 2 | 3
(Switzerland) Alexandra Rohner | 6 | 6
(Australia) Kristin Godridge | 6 | 6
(West Germany) Barbara Rittner | 4 | 1
(Canada) Laura Randmaa | 0 | 0
3 | (South Africa) Amanda Coetzer | 6 | 6

Second round
6 | (United States) M McGrath | 6 | 3 | 6
(South Africa) R Gaddie | 3 | 6 | 3
(Spain) S Ramón-Cortés | 7 | 5 | 2
12 | (Israel) Y Segal | 6 | 7 | 6
(Venezuela) E Nieto | 6 | 2 | 6
(Switzerland) A Rohner | 2 | 6 | 2
(Australia) K Godridge | 3 | 7 | 4
3 | (South Africa) A Coetzer | 6 | 6 | 6

Third round
6 | (United States) M McGrath | 7 | 7
12 | (Israel) Y Segal | 5 | 5
(Venezuela) E Nieto | 3 | 4
3 | (South Africa) A Coetzer | 6 | 6

Quarterfinals
6 | (United States) M McGrath | 7 | 6
3 | (South Africa) A Coetzer | 5 | 3

==== Section 4 ====
First round
8 | (United States) Kim Kessaris | 6 | 6
(Chile) Paula Cabezas | 2 | 4
(Bangladesh) Daisy Aziz | 0 | 0
(United Kingdom) Shirli-Ann Siddall | 6 | 6
(Philippines) Sarah Castillejo | 1 | 2
(United Kingdom) Sarah Bentley | 6 | 6
(Republic of Ireland) Gina Niland | 1 | 5
9 | (Italy) Silvia Farina | 6 | 7
15 | (South Africa) Michelle Anderson | 6 | 6
(Soviet Union) Svetlana Komleva | 2 | 1
(Australia) Nicole Pratt | 2 | 1
(United Kingdom) Rachel Viollet | 6 | 6
(Soviet Union) Natalia Biletskaia | 3 | 3
(West Germany) Anke Huber | 6 | 6
(Austria) Sandra Reichel | 0 | 0
2 | (United States) Carrie Cunningham | 6 | 6

Second round
8 | (United States) K Kessaris | 6 | 6
(United Kingdom) S-A Siddall | 3 | 1
(United Kingdom) S Bentley | 4 | 2
9 | (Italy) S Farina | 6 | 6
15 | (South Africa) M Anderson | 6 | 6
(United Kingdom) R Viollet | 1 | 4
(West Germany) A Huber | 7 | 5 | 3
2 | (United States) C Cunningham | 6 | 7 | 6

Third round
8 | (United States) K Kessaris | 6 | 6
9 | (Italy) S Farina | 0 | 4
15 | (South Africa) M Anderson | 6 | 6
2 | (United States) C Cunningham | 4 | 2

Quarterfinals
8 | (United States) K Kessaris | 4 | 5
15 | (South Africa) M Anderson | 6 | 7
