= Clinton Banducci =

South African tennis player

- Country (sports): South Africa
- Born: 5 April 1968 (age 57) Benoni, South Africa
- Height: 6 ft 0 in (183 cm)

Singles
- Highest ranking: No. 526 (10 September 1990)

Doubles
- Career record: 0–1
- Highest ranking: No. 296 (17 February 1992)

Grand Slam doubles results
- Wimbledon: 2R (1989)

Clinton Banducci (born 5 April 1968) is a South African former tennis player.

Banducci qualified for the first round of the 1989 Wimbledon Championships – Mixed Doubles with Heather Ludloff and they defeated Steve DeVries and Rosemary Casals in the first round before losing to the number 4 seeds Robert Seguso and Lori McNeil in the second round. He was a Doubles All-American in 1988 and 1989 whilst playing for TCU Horned Frogs men's tennis at the Texas Christian University.
