= 1989 French Open =

- Date: 29 May – 11 June 1989
- Edition: 88
- Category: 59th Grand Slam (ITF)
- Surface: Clay
- Location: Paris (XVI^{e}), France
- Venue: Stade Roland Garros

Champions

Men's singles
- (United States) Michael Chang

Women's singles
- (Spain) Arantxa Sánchez Vicario

Men's doubles
- (United States) Jim Grabb / (United States) Patrick McEnroe

Women's doubles
- (Soviet Union) Larisa Savchenko Neiland / (Soviet Union) Natalia Zvereva

Mixed doubles
- (Netherlands) Manon Bollegraf / (Netherlands) Tom Nijssen
- French Open

The 1989 French Open was a tennis tournament that took place on the outdoor clay courts at the Stade Roland Garros in Paris, France. The tournament was held from 29 May until 11 June. It was the 88th staging of the French Open, and the second Grand Slam tennis event of 1989.

For the first time in French Open history the Singles championships were won by two teenagers – Michael Chang (17 years, 3 months) and Arantxa Sánchez (17 years, 6 months). Chang still holds the record for youngest ever male Grand Slam singles title winner. He gained admirers for his audacious style of play and battling qualities. Sánchez broke the record for the youngest champion at Roland Garros, a record bettered the following year by Monica Seles (16 years, 6 months).

Sánchez's victory made her only the seventh woman to win a Grand Slam tournament in the 1980s; the others being Hana Mandlíková, Chris Evert, Evonne Cawley, Martina Navratilova, Tracy Austin, and Steffi Graf.

Steffi Graf's loss in the women's final was her only Grand Slam defeat in two years. She won eight of the nine Grand Slam tournaments from the 1988 Australian Open – 1990 Australian Open. This prevented her from completing a second consecutive Grand Slam and was her 9th Grand Slam final on her record run of 13 finals.

One notable débutant was Monica Seles, appearing in her first Grand Slam. She reached the semi-finals without being seeded, and aged only 15. Jennifer Capriati also made her presence felt, becoming the youngest winner (13 years, 2 months) of the girls' singles title – this record was broken in 1993 by Martina Hingis, aged 12.

== Seniors ==
=== Men's singles ===
(United States) Michael Chang (Note: At the age of 17, Chang became the youngest-ever male Grand Slam singles title winner.) defeated (Sweden) Stefan Edberg, 6–1, 3–6, 4–6, 6–4, 6–2

- It was Chang's 1st title of the year, and his 2nd overall. It was his 1st (and only) career Grand Slam title.

=== Women's singles ===
(Spain) Arantxa Sánchez Vicario (Note: Sánchez became the first Spanish woman to win a Grand Slam singles title.) defeated (West Germany) Steffi Graf, 7–6^{(8–6)}, 3–6, 7–5

- It was Sánchez Vicario's 2nd title of the year, and her 3rd overall. It was her 1st career Grand Slam title.

=== Men's doubles ===
(United States) Jim Grabb / (United States) Patrick McEnroe defeated (Iran) Mansour Bahrami / (France) Éric Winogradsky, 6–4, 2–6, 6–4, 7–6^{(7–5)}

=== Women's doubles ===
(Soviet Union) Larisa Savchenko Neiland / (Soviet Union) Natalia Zvereva defeated (West Germany) Steffi Graf / (Argentina) Gabriela Sabatini, 6–4, 6–4

=== Mixed doubles ===
(Netherlands) Manon Bollegraf / (Netherlands) Tom Nijssen defeated (Argentina) Horacio de la Peña / (Spain) Arantxa Sánchez Vicario, 6–3, 6–7, 6–2

== Juniors ==
=== Boys' singles ===
(France) Fabrice Santoro defeated (United States) Jared Palmer, 6–3, 3–6, 9–7

=== Girls' singles ===
(United States) Jennifer Capriati (Note: Capriati won the 2001 women's singles title.) defeated (Czechoslovakia) Eva Švíglerová, 6–4, 6–0

=== Boys' doubles ===
(Australia) Johan Anderson / (Australia) Todd Woodbridge

=== Girls' doubles ===
(Australia) Nicole Pratt / (Chinese Taipei) Wang Shi-ting

== Prize money ==
Event		W	F	SF	QF	4R	3R	2R	1R
Singles	Men	$291,752	$145,876	$72,938	$36,955	$19,450	$10,892	$6,421	$3,913
Singles	Women	$257,379	$128,690	$64,345	$32,601	$17,158	$9,610	$5,664	$3,452

Total prize money for the event was $4,545,000.

== Notes ==
Preceded by 1989 Australian Open	Grand Slams	Succeeded by 1989 Wimbledon Championships
