= List of Chile Davis Cup team representatives =

This is a list of tennis players who have represented the Chile Davis Cup team in an official Davis Cup match. Chile have taken part in the competition since 1928.

== Players ==
Player	W-L (Total)	W-L (Singles)	W-L (Doubles)	Ties	Debut
Daniel Achondo	0–1	0–1	0–0	1	1958
Ricardo Acuña	23–18	14–13	9–5	21	1980
Jorge Aguilar	2–5	2–1	0–4	5	2010
Ernesto Aguirre	11–15	4–7	7–8	15	1959
Patricio Apey	2–2	2–2	0–0	2	1961
Cristián Araya	1–2	0–0	1–2	3	1988
Luis Ayala	37–14	27–6	10–8	18	1952
Ricardo Balbiers	9–6	7–4	2–2	6	1949
Óscar Bustos	2–3	1–1	1–2	3	1996
Paul Capdeville	8–12	8–8	0–4	15	2004
Roberto Conrads	0–1	0–0	0–1	1	1931
Patricio Cornejo	34–40	23–22	11–18	32	1964
Sergio Cortés	7–5	5–5	2–0	6	1990
Elías Deik	2–2	2–2	0–0	2	1933
Salvador Deik	2–2	1–1	1–1	2	1933
José Antonio Fernández	7–4	7–4	0–0	6	1985
Jaime Fillol	31–42	22–26	9–16	28	1969
Álvaro Fillol	3–1	1–0	2–1	3	1984
Hermes Gamonal	7–6	3–5	4–1	9	1998
Adrián García	6–5	4–3	2–2	9	2000
Hans Gildemeister	36–12	23–6	13–6	28	1978
Fernando González	31–13	20–7	11–6	23	1998
Andrés Hammersley	10–13	6–9	4–4	8	1954
Guillermo Hormazábal	0–2	0–2	0–0	3	2002
Gonzalo Lama	2-1	2-1	0-0	2	2014
Nicolás Massú	32–24	22–12	10–12	29	1996
Herbert Muller	0–1	0–0	0–1	1	1931
Francisco Musalem	0–1	0–1	0–0	1	1972
Omar Pabst	2–2	1–1	1–1	4	1965
Lionel Page	0-1	0–1	0–0	1	1931
Jaime René Pinto Bravo	15–13	11–8	4–5	15	1963
Hans Podlipnik Castillo	0–2	0–2	0–0	2	2008
Belus Prajoux	15–8	7–3	8–5	15	1972
Juan Pablo Queirolo	0–6	0–4	0–2	4	1985
Pedro Rebolledo	20–12	19–11	1–1	17	1981
Marcelo Rebolledo	0–3	0–0	0–3	3	1994
Marcelo Ríos	28–17	25–10	3–7	21	1993
Felipe Rivera	2–4	1–3	1–1	3	1991
Guillermo Rivera Aránguiz	0–1	0–1	0–0	1	2011
Patricio Rodríguez	19–25	18–17	1–8	20	1958
Cristóbal Saavedra Corvalán	0–1	0–1	0–0	1	2010
Carlos Sanhueza	0–1	0–0	0–1	1	1952
Egon Schonherr	2–2	1–1	1–1	3	1931
Gabriel Silberstein	11–9	8–6	3–3	9	1993
Marcelo Taverne	2–7	0–6	2–1	3	1949
Domingo Torralva Ponsa	1–5	0–4	1–1	2	1928
Luis Torralva Ponsa	3–3	2–2	1–1	2	1928
Róbinson Ureta	3–5	3–5	0–0	4	1987
Gerardo Vacarezza	3–3	1–2	2–1	5	1986
