= Ulli Nganga =

British tennis player

- Full name: Ulrich Nganga
- Country (sports): Great Britain
- Born: 17 April 1970 (age 55); Norfolk, England

Singles
- Highest ranking: No. 420 (20 Nov 1989)

Grand Slam singles results
- Wimbledon: Q2 (1989)

Doubles
- Career record: 1–2
- Highest ranking: No. 394 (10 Sep 1990)

Grand Slam doubles results
- Wimbledon: 1R (1990)

Ulrich Nganga (born 17 April 1970) is a British former professional tennis player.

Nganga, born to a German mother and Kenyan father, grew up in Norfolk and was trained at the LTA School, Bisham Abbey. He reached a career best singles ranking of 420 and was ranked as high as ninth in Britain. In 1990 he featured in his only Wimbledon main draw, partnering Jason Goodall in the men's doubles.
