= 1989 Wimbledon Championships – Mixed doubles =

Mixed doubles
- 1989 Wimbledon Championships

Final
- Champions: (United States) Jim Pugh (Czechoslovakia) Jana Novotná
- Runners-up: (Australia) Mark Kratzmann (Australia) Jenny Byrne
- Score: 6–4, 5–7, 6–4

Details
- Draw: 64 (3 Q / 5 WC )
- Seeds: 16

Events
Singles	men	women		boys	girls
Doubles	men	women	mixed	boys	girls
WC Singles	men	women	quad
WC Doubles	men	women	quad
Legends	men	women	seniors
← 1988 ·	Wimbledon Championships	· 1990 →

Sherwood Stewart and Zina Garrison were the defending champions but lost in the third round to Mark Kratzmann and Jenny Byrne.

Jim Pugh and Jana Novotná defeated Kratzmann and Byrne in the final, 6–4, 5–7, 6–4, to win their fourth Mixed Doubles tennis title, the first at the Wimbledon Championships.

== Seeds ==
1. (United States) Jim Pugh / (Czechoslovakia) Jana Novotná (champions)
2. (United States) Ken Flach / (Canada) Jill Hetherington (first round)
3. (United States) Rick Leach / (United States) Betsy Nagelsen (semifinals)
4. (United States) Robert Seguso / (United States) Lori McNeil (semifinals)
5. (Australia) John Fitzgerald / (Australia) Elizabeth Smylie (second round)
6. (United States) Sherwood Stewart / (United States) Zina Garrison (third round)
7. (United States) Patrick McEnroe / (Puerto Rico) Gigi Fernández (third round)
8. (Australia) Mark Woodforde / (Australia) Hana Mandlíková (second round)
9. (South Africa) Danie Visser / (South Africa) Rosalyn Fairbank (third round)
10. (Australia) Peter Doohan / (United States) Elise Burgin (third round)
11. (United States) Robert Van't Hof / (United States) Robin White (second round)
12. (Netherlands) Tom Nijssen / (Netherlands) Manon Bollegraf (third round)
13. (Mexico) Jorge Lozano / (France) Catherine Suire (second round)
14. (Australia) Mark Kratzmann / (Australia) Jenny Byrne (final)
15. (South Africa) Pieter Aldrich / (South Africa) Elna Reinach (first round)
16. (Denmark) Michael Mortensen / (Denmark) Tine Scheuer-Larsen (third round)

Click on the seed number of a player to go to their draw section.

== Draw ==
=== Key ===
- Q = Qualifier
- WC = Wild card
- LL = Lucky loser
- Alt = Alternate
- ITF = ITF entry
- PR = Protected ranking
- SR = Special ranking
- SE = Special exempt
- JE = Junior exempt
- JR = Junior Accelerator Programme entrant
- CO = College Accelerator Programme entrant
- NG = Next Gen Accelerator Program entrant
- w/o = Walkover
- r = Retired
- d = Defaulted

=== Finals ===
Quarterfinals
1	(United States) Jim Pugh (Czechoslovakia) Jana Novotná	2	6	9
(United States) David Wheaton (United States) Mary Joe Fernández	6	4	7
4	(United States) Robert Seguso (United States) Lori McNeil	6	6
(South Africa) Royce Deppe (South Africa) Dinky van Rensburg	2	4
(Australia) Darren Cahill (Australia) Nicole Provis
3	(United States) Rick Leach (United States) Betsy Nagelsen	w/o
14	(Australia) Mark Kratzmann (Australia) Jenny Byrne	3	7	13
(South Africa) Neil Broad (United States) Terry Phelps	6	5	11

Semifinals
1	(United States) Jim Pugh (Czechoslovakia) Jana Novotná	6	5	6
4	(United States) Robert Seguso (United States) Lori McNeil	1	7	4
3	(United States) Rick Leach (United States) Betsy Nagelsen	4	6
14	(Australia) Mark Kratzmann (Australia) Jenny Byrne	6	7

Final
1	(United States) Jim Pugh (Czechoslovakia) Jana Novotná	6	5	6
14	(Australia) Mark Kratzmann (Australia) Jenny Byrne	4	7	4

=== Top half ===
==== Section 1 ====
First round
1	(United States) J Pugh (Czechoslovakia) J Novotná	6	6
(The Bahamas) R Smith (United States) K Adams	4	4
(United States) R Reneberg (United States) M Louie Harper	6	6
LL	(United States) P Palandjian (United States) J Thomas	1	2
(United States) B Willenborg (United States) P Barg	6	4
LL	(South Africa) B Talbot (United States) D Faber	7	6
(United States) G Layendecker (Australia) L Field	7	4	4
16	(Denmark) M Mortensen (Denmark) T Scheuer-Larsen	5	6	6
12	(Netherlands) T Nijssen (Netherlands) M Bollegraf	6	6
(United States) G Van Emburgh (United States) J Smoller	3	4
WC	(United Kingdom) N Fulwood (United Kingdom) J Salmon	6	4	3
Q	(Australia) S Furlong (Australia) K Radford	2	6	6
LL	(Republic of Ireland) P Wright (United States) L Antonoplis	4	6
(United States) D Wheaton (United States) MJ Fernández	6	7
LL	(South Africa) C Honey (Netherlands) A van Buuren	4	2
8	(Australia) M Woodforde (Australia) H Mandlíková	6	6

Second round
1	(United States) J Pugh (Czechoslovakia) J Novotná	6	6
(United States) R Reneberg (United States) M Louie Harper	3	2
LL	(South Africa) B Talbot (United States) D Faber	3	3
16	(Denmark) M Mortensen (Denmark) T Scheuer-Larsen	6	6
12	(Netherlands) T Nijssen (Netherlands) M Bollegraf	7	6
Q	(Australia) S Furlong (Australia) K Radford	5	4
(United States) D Wheaton (United States) MJ Fernández	7	3	6
8	(Australia) M Woodforde (Australia) H Mandlíková	6	6	4

Third round
1	(United States) J Pugh (Czechoslovakia) J Novotná	6	7
16	(Denmark) M Mortensen (Denmark) T Scheuer-Larsen	2	5
12	(Netherlands) T Nijssen (Netherlands) M Bollegraf	2	6	2
(United States) D Wheaton (United States) MJ Fernández	6	2	6

Quarterfinals
1	(United States) J Pugh (Czechoslovakia) J Novotná	2	6	9
(United States) D Wheaton (United States) MJ Fernández	6	4	7

==== Section 2 ====
First round
4	(United States) R Seguso (United States) L McNeil	6	6
(South Africa) E Edwards (United States) M Van Nostrand	2	4
Q	(South Africa) C Banducci (United States) H Ludloff	6	7
(United States) S DeVries (United States) R Casals	4	6
(Australia) L Warder (United Kingdom) B Borneo	3	7	4
(United Kingdom) A Castle (United Kingdom) A Hobbs	6	5	6
(United States) J Letts (United States) Ca MacGregor	2	3
9	(South Africa) D Visser (South Africa) R Fairbank	6	6
13	(Mexico) J Lozano (France) C Suire	6	6
(Canada) G Michibata (United States) M Norwood	3	2
(Australia) B Dyke (Australia) M Jaggard	6	6
(United States) B Man-Son-Hing (United States) Cy MacGregor	0	3
(South Africa) R Deppe (South Africa) D van Rensburg	6	7
WC	(United Kingdom) J Goodall (United Kingdom) V Lake	3	5
(Czechoslovakia) C Suk (Czechoslovakia) I Budařová	4	4
5	(Australia) J Fitzgerald (Australia) E Smylie	6	6

Second round
4	(United States) R Seguso (United States) L McNeil	6	6
Q	(South Africa) C Banducci (United States) H Ludloff	4	1
(United Kingdom) A Castle (United Kingdom) A Hobbs	4	6
9	(South Africa) D Visser (South Africa) R Fairbank	6	7
13	(Mexico) J Lozano (France) C Suire	6	3	2
(Australia) B Dyke (Australia) M Jaggard	1	6	6
(South Africa) R Deppe (South Africa) D van Rensburg	5	6	11
5	(Australia) J Fitzgerald (Australia) E Smylie	7	4	9

Third round
4	(United States) R Seguso (United States) L McNeil	3	7	6
9	(South Africa) D Visser (South Africa) R Fairbank	6	5	2
(Australia) B Dyke (Australia) M Jaggard	5	6
(South Africa) R Deppe (South Africa) D van Rensburg	7	7

Quarterfinals
4	(United States) R Seguso (United States) L McNeil	6	6
(South Africa) R Deppe (South Africa) D van Rensburg	2	4

=== Bottom half ===
==== Section 3 ====
First round
7	(United States) P McEnroe (Puerto Rico) G Fernández	7	6
(United States) J Rive (United States) B Potter	6	1
(United States) B Pearce (United States) C Reynolds	7	6
LL	(Mexico) L Herrera (Argentina) C Tessi	5	1
(Australia) D Cahill (Australia) N Provis	6	6
(United States) L Jensen (United States) J Fuchs	2	0
(Netherlands) M Schapers (Netherlands) B Schultz	6	1	6
15	(South Africa) P Aldrich (South Africa) E Reinach	4	6	3
10	(Australia) P Doohan (United States) E Burgin	6	3	6
(Australia) S Youl (Australia) A Minter	1	6	3
(United Kingdom) S Shaw (Sweden) C Lindqvist	6	5	6
LL	(Australia) N Borwick (Hong Kong) P Moreno	4	7	8
WC	(United Kingdom) J Lloyd (Australia) W Turnbull	6	6	6
(United States) T Siegel (United States) J Kaplan	3	7	4
LL	(United States) L Scott (Brazil) T Zambrzycki	3	6	3
3	(United States) R Leach (United States) E Nagelsen	6	3	6

Second round
7	(United States) P McEnroe (Puerto Rico) G Fernández	7	7
(United States) B Pearce (United States) C Reynolds	6	6
(Australia) D Cahill (Australia) N Provis	5	6	6
(Netherlands) M Schapers (Netherlands) B Schultz	7	2	3
10	(Australia) P Doohan (United States) E Burgin	6	6
LL	(Australia) N Borwick (Hong Kong) P Moreno	2	3
WC	(United Kingdom) J Lloyd (Australia) W Turnbull
3	(United States) R Leach (United States) E Nagelsen	w/o

Third round
7	(United States) P McEnroe (Puerto Rico) G Fernández	2	6	4
(Australia) D Cahill (Australia) N Provis	6	4	6
10	(Australia) P Doohan (United States) E Burgin	4	7	4
3	(United States) R Leach (United States) E Nagelsen	6	5	6

Quarterfinals
(Australia) D Cahill (Australia) N Provis
3	(United States) R Leach (United States) E Nagelsen	w/o

==== Section 4 ====
First round
6/ WC	(United States) S Stewart (United States) Z Garrison	6	6
(Czechoslovakia) R Vogel (Czechoslovakia) J Pospíšilová	4	4
(Australia) T Woodbridge (United States) W White	6	6
LL	(Australia) G Pfitzner (Austria) H Sprung	2	1
Q	(South Africa) B Levine (United States) M McGrath	6	2
(United States) K Jones (United States) G Magers	7	6
(Canada) G Connell (Hong Kong) P Hy	7	4	2
14	(Australia) M Kratzmann (Australia) J Byrne	6	6	6
11	(United States) R Van't Hof (United States) R White	6	6
(Sweden) T Svantesson (Australia) L O'Neill	1	3
(Australia) J Stoltenberg (Australia) J-A Faull	7	6
(France) J-P Fleurian (United States) S Collins	6	3
(South Africa) N Broad (United States) T Phelps	6	6
WC	(United Kingdom) D Felgate (United Kingdom) C Wood	1	2
(United States) T Pawsat (United States) E Herr	7	6
2	(United States) K Flach (Canada) J Hetherington	6	4

Second round
6/ WC	(United States) S Stewart (United States) Z Garrison	6	6
(Australia) T Woodbridge (United States) W White	4	4
(United States) K Jones (United States) G Magers	1	4
14	(Australia) M Kratzmann (Australia) J Byrne	6	6
11	(United States) R Van't Hof (United States) R White	3	6	3
(Australia) J Stoltenberg (Australia) J-A Faull	6	3	6
(South Africa) N Broad (United States) T Phelps	3	7	6
(United States) T Pawsat (United States) E Herr	6	6	2

Third round
6/ WC	(United States) S Stewart (United States) Z Garrison	2	4
14	(Australia) M Kratzmann (Australia) J Byrne	6	6
(Australia) J Stoltenberg (Australia) J-A Faull	6	4
(South Africa) N Broad (United States) T Phelps	7	6

Quarterfinals
14	(Australia) M Kratzmann (Australia) J Byrne	3	7	13
(South Africa) N Broad (United States) T Phelps	6	5	11
