= Johan Anderson =

Australian tennis player

- Country (sports): Australia
- Residence: Australia
- Born: 29 September 1971 (age 54) Västerås, Sweden
- Height: 171 cm (5 ft 7 in)
- Plays: Right-handed
- Prize money: $247,738

Singles
- Career record: 26–38
- Career titles: 0; 1 Challenger, 0 Futures
- Highest ranking: No. 90 (23 October 1989)

Grand Slam singles results
- Australian Open: 2R (1991)
- French Open: 3R (1990)
- Wimbledon: 2R (1990)
- US Open: 2R (1990)

Doubles
- Career record: 5–17
- Career titles: 0; 2 Challenger, 0 Futures
- Highest ranking: No. 178 (22 July 1991)

Grand Slam doubles results
- Australian Open: 1R (1988, 1989, 1990, 1991, 1992)
- Wimbledon: Q1 (1989)

Grand Slam mixed doubles results
- Australian Open: 1R (1989)
- Last updated on: 20 October 2021.

Johan Anderson (born 29 September 1971 in Västerås, Sweden) is an Australian former tennis player.

== Tennis career ==
In 1988, Anderson won the boys' singles title at the Australian Open. He also partnered Todd Woodbridge to win the Australian Open and Roland Garros junior boys doubles in 1989. However, after playing on the men's professional tennis circuit for a short period, he decided not to pursue a professional tennis career.

Anderson is currently coaching tennis at Sydney tennis academy.

== Junior Grand Slam finals ==
=== Singles: 1 (1 title) ===
Result	Year	Tournament	Surface	Opponent	Score
Win	1988	Australian Open	Hard	(Australia) Andrew Florent	7–5, 7–6^{(7–4)}

=== Doubles: 3 (2 titles, 1 runner-up) ===
Result	Year	Tournament	Surface	Partner	Opponents	Score
Loss	1988	Australian Open	Hard	(Australia) Richard Fromberg	(Australia) Jason Stoltenberg (Australia) Todd Woodbridge	3–6, 2–6
Win	1989	Australian Open	Hard	(Australia) Todd Woodbridge	(Australia) Andrew Kratzmann (Australia) Jamie Morgan	6–4, 6–2
Win	1989	French Open	Clay	(Australia) Todd Woodbridge	(Mexico) Luis-Enrique Herrera (The Bahamas) Mark Knowles	6–3, 4–6, 6–2

== ATP Challenger and ITF Futures finals ==
=== Singles: 1 (1–0) ===
Legend ATP Challenger (1–0) ITF Futures (0–0)	Finals by surface Hard (1–0) Clay (0–0) Grass (0–0) Carpet (0–0)

Result	W–L	Date	Tournament	Tier	Surface	Opponent	Score
Win	1–0	Aug 1989	Hong Kong, Hong Kong	Challenger	Hard	(South Korea) Kim Bong-Soo	7–5, 3–6, 6–4

=== Doubles: 2 (2–0) ===
Legend ATP Challenger (2–0) ITF Futures (0–0)	Finals by surface Hard (0–0) Clay (2–0) Grass (0–0) Carpet (0–0)

Result	W–L	Date	Tournament	Tier	Surface	Partner	Opponents	Score
Win	1–0	Jul 1990	Hanko, Finland	Challenger	Clay	(Sweden) Lars-Anders Wahlgren	(Sweden) Tomas Nydahl (Sweden) Peter Svensson	6–3, 7–5, 6–0
Win	2–0	Jul 1992	Oberstaufen, Germany	Challenger	Clay	(Sweden) Lars-Anders Wahlgren	(Belgium) Filip Dewulf (Belgium) Tom Vanhoudt	2–6, 7–6, 6–4

== Performance timeline ==
Key
W	F	SF	QF	#R	RR	Q#	DNQ	A	NH

(W) winner; (F) finalist; (SF) semifinalist; (QF) quarterfinalist; (#R) rounds 4, 3, 2, 1; (RR) round-robin stage; (Q#) qualification round; (DNQ) did not qualify; (A) absent; (NH) not held; (SR) strike rate (events won / competed); (W–L) win–loss record.

=== Singles ===
Tournament	1988	1989	1990	1991	1992	1993	1994	1995	SR	W–L	Win %
Grand Slam tournaments
Australian Open	1R	1R	1R	2R	Q2	Q2	Q1	Q1	0 / 4	1–4	20%
French Open	A	A	3R	A	A	A	A	A	0 / 1	2–1	67%
Wimbledon	Q3	Q1	2R	A	A	A	A	A	0 / 1	1–1	50%
US Open	A	A	2R	A	A	A	A	A	0 / 1	1–1	50%
Win–loss	0–1	0–1	4–4	1–1	0–0	0–0	0–0	0–0	0 / 7	5–7	42%

== Sources ==
- Johan Anderson at the Association of Tennis Professionals
- Johan Anderson at World Tennis
