= 1989 Wimbledon Championships – Men's singles =

Men's singles
- 1989 Wimbledon Championships

Final
- Champion: (West Germany) Boris Becker
- Runner-up: (Sweden) Stefan Edberg
- Score: 6–0, 7–6^{(7–1)}, 6–4

Details
- Draw: 128 (16Q / 8WC)
- Seeds: 16

Events
Singles	men	women		boys	girls
Doubles	men	women	mixed	boys	girls
WC Singles	men	women	quad
WC Doubles	men	women	quad
Legends	men	women	seniors
- Wimbledon Championships

Boris Becker defeated defending champion Stefan Edberg in a rematch of the previous year's final, 6–0, 7–6^{(7–1)}, 6–4 to win the gentlemen's singles tennis title at the 1989 Wimbledon Championships. It was his third Wimbledon title and third major title overall.

The semifinal match between Ivan Lendl and Becker was (at the time) the longest-ever Wimbledon semifinal, at 4 hours 1 minute long. It was later surpassed by the 2013 encounter between Novak Djokovic and Juan Martín del Potro, which would last 4 hours and 43 minutes.

John McEnroe reached the semifinals, his best showing at a major since reaching the 1985 US Open final.

== Seeds ==
1. (Czechoslovakia) Ivan Lendl (semifinals)
2. (Sweden) Stefan Edberg (final)
3. (West Germany) Boris Becker (champion)
4. (Sweden) Mats Wilander (quarterfinals)
5. (United States) John McEnroe (semifinals)
6. (Switzerland) Jakob Hlasek (first round)
7. (Czechoslovakia) Miloslav Mečíř (third round)
8. (United States) Tim Mayotte (quarterfinals)
9. (United States) Michael Chang (fourth round)
10. (United States) Jimmy Connors (second round)
11. (United States) Brad Gilbert (first round)
12. (United States) Kevin Curren (third round)
13. (United States) Aaron Krickstein (fourth round)
14. (Soviet Union) Andrei Chesnokov (first round)
15. (Sweden) Mikael Pernfors (second round)
16. (Israel) Amos Mansdorf (fourth round)

Click on the seed number of a player to go to their draw section.

== Draw ==
Key

- Q = Qualifier
- WC = Wild card
- LL = Lucky loser
- Alt = Alternate
- ITF = ITF entry
- PR = Protected ranking
- SR = Special ranking
- SE = Special exempt
- JE = Junior exempt
- JR = Junior Accelerator Programme entrant
- CO = College Accelerator Programme entrant
- NG = Next Gen Accelerator Program entrant
- w/o = Walkover
- r = Retired
- d = Defaulted

=== Finals ===
Quarterfinals
1	(Czechoslovakia) Ivan Lendl	7^{10}	7^{7}	6
(United States) Dan Goldie	6^{8}	6^{4}	0
3	(West Germany) Boris Becker	6	6	6
(United States) Paul Chamberlin	1	2	0
5	(United States) John McEnroe	7^{8}	3	6	6
4	(Sweden) Mats Wilander	6^{6}	6	3	4
8	(United States) Tim Mayotte	6^{2}	6^{12}	3
2	(Sweden) Stefan Edberg	7^{7}	7^{14}	6

Semifinals
1	(Czechoslovakia) Ivan Lendl	5	7^{7}	6	4	3
3	(West Germany) Boris Becker	7	6^{2}	2	6	6
5	(United States) John McEnroe	5	6^{2}	6^{5}
2	(Sweden) Stefan Edberg	7	7^{7}	7^{7}

Final
3	(West Germany) Boris Becker	6	7^{7}	6
2	(Sweden) Stefan Edberg	0	6^{1}	4

=== Top half ===
==== Section 1 ====
First round
1	(Czechoslovakia) I Lendl	7	4	6	6	6
(Venezuela) N Pereira	6	6	3	7	1
Q	(United States) B Garnett	2	4	7	6	1
Q	(Sweden) R Båthman	6	6	6	4	6
(Czechoslovakia) M Vajda	6	6	7	6
(Canada) G Michibata	7	1	6	3
(Spain) T Carbonell	6	3	7	6
(United States) M Davis	4	6	6	4
(Socialist Federal Republic of Yugoslavia) G Ivanišević	6	6	3	6
(France) T Champion	3	4	6	3
WC	(United States) K Flach	7	7	3	0	6
Q	(United States) S Giammalva	6	6	6	6	3
(India) R Krishnan	4	6	5
(Sweden) P Lundgren	6	7	7
(West Germany) M Stich	7	1	3	2
15	(Sweden) M Pernfors	5	6	6	6

Second round
1	(Czechoslovakia) I Lendl	6	6	6	6
Q	(Sweden) R Båthman	7	3	2	2
(Czechoslovakia) M Vajda	2	4	5
(Spain) T Carbonell	6	6	7
(Socialist Federal Republic of Yugoslavia) G Ivanišević	4	3	6	3
WC	(United States) K Flach	6	6	4	6
(Sweden) P Lundgren	7	6	6
15	(Sweden) M Pernfors	6	2	4

Third round
1	(Czechoslovakia) I Lendl	7	6	6
(Spain) T Carbonell	6	3	1
WC	(United States) K Flach	3	2	7	3
(Sweden) P Lundgren	6	6	6	6

Fourth round
1	(Czechoslovakia) I Lendl	1	7^{7}	6	6
(Sweden) P Lundgren	6	6^{5}	2	4

==== Section 2 ====
First round
10	(United States) J Connors	6	6	4	6
(Soviet Union) A Cherkasov	3	2	6	3
(New Zealand) K Evernden	6	6	6	0
(United States) D Goldie	7	7	3	6
Q	(United States) J Rive	7	6	6	7
LL	(United States) M Anger	6	2	7	5
Q	(India) Z Ali	3	4	2
(Australia) W Masur	6	6	6
(Socialist Federal Republic of Yugoslavia) S Živojinović	3	7	6	6
(Sweden) A Järryd	6	6	3	0
(Czechoslovakia) J Čihák	5	7	6	3	4
WC	(United Kingdom) C Bailey	7	6	3	6	6
(Australia) M Kratzmann	6	7	6
(Finland) V Paloheimo	2	6	1
Q	(United States) S Warner	2	2	4
7	(Czechoslovakia) M Mečíř	6	6	6

Second round
10	(United States) J Connors	6	7	4	2
(United States) D Goldie	7	5	6	6
Q	(United States) J Rive	3	6	6	2
(Australia) W Masur	6	7	4	6
(Socialist Federal Republic of Yugoslavia) S Živojinović	6	7	7
WC	(United Kingdom) C Bailey	3	5	6
(Australia) M Kratzmann	7	6	1	5	5
7	(Czechoslovakia) M Mečíř	6	4	6	7	7

Third round
(United States) D Goldie	7	7	3	7
(Australia) W Masur	6	6	6	6
(Socialist Federal Republic of Yugoslavia) S Živojinović	6	6	7	6
7	(Czechoslovakia) M Mečíř	7	1	5	3

Fourth round
(United States) D Goldie	6	6	7^{8}
(Socialist Federal Republic of Yugoslavia) S Živojinović	4	4	6^{6}

==== Section 3 ====
First round
3	(West Germany) B Becker	6	6	7
Q	(United States) B Shelton	1	4	6
(Finland) O Rahnasto	6	2	4	4
(United States) R Matuszewski	2	6	6	6
(Italy) D Nargiso	6	3	7	3	4
(Sweden) J Gunnarsson	3	6	6	6	6
(United States) D Rostagno	7	6	6
(Australia) S Youl	6	4	4
(Czechoslovakia) M Střelba	6	2	3
(West Germany) P Kühnen	7	6	6
(The Bahamas) R Smith	6	2	4
(South Africa) P Aldrich	7	6	6
(Argentina) J Frana	6	6	7	5	6
(United States) J Grabb	7	3	6	7	4
(Italy) F Cancellotti	1	2	6	1
13	(United States) A Krickstein	6	6	3	6

Second round
3	(West Germany) B Becker	6	7	6
(United States) R Matuszewski	3	5	4
(Sweden) J Gunnarsson	6	2	7	7	9
(United States) D Rostagno	7	6	5	6	7
(West Germany) P Kühnen	6	7	6
(South Africa) P Aldrich	1	5	0
(Argentina) J Frana	6	3	6	6	5
13	(United States) A Krickstein	4	6	3	7	7

Third round
3	(West Germany) B Becker	7	7	6
(Sweden) J Gunnarsson	5	6	3
(West Germany) P Kühnen	6	3	3	2
13	(United States) A Krickstein	4	6	6	6

Fourth round
3	(West Germany) B Becker	6	6	7
13	(United States) A Krickstein	4	4	5

==== Section 4 ====
First round
12	(United States) K Curren	6	4	7	6
WC	(United Kingdom) A Castle	2	6	6	3
Q	(United States) K Jones	3	3	3
(Czechoslovakia) M Šrejber	6	6	6
(United States) J Kriek	6	2	2
(United States) L Shiras	7	6	6
WC	(United Kingdom) J Bates	6	6	4	7	6
(Brazil) C Motta	7	1	6	6	3
(Spain) F Luna	2	7	2	1
WC	(United Kingdom) M Petchey	6	6	6	6
(United States) J Canter	6	6	6	6
Q	(United Kingdom) N Fulwood	7	3	7	7
(United States) P Chamberlin	4	6	7	6
(South Africa) G Muller	6	3	5	3
(Sweden) T Högstedt	6	7	6
6	(Switzerland) J Hlasek	3	6	1

Second round
12	(United States) K Curren	4	6	6	6
(Czechoslovakia) M Šrejber	6	2	3	0
(United States) L Shiras	4	7	6	6
WC	(United Kingdom) J Bates	6	5	3	2
WC	(United Kingdom) M Petchey	5	1	2
Q	(United Kingdom) N Fulwood	7	6	6
(United States) P Chamberlin	6	6	6
(Sweden) T Högstedt	3	2	2

Third round
12	(United States) K Curren	6	3	7	6	3
(United States) L Shiras	4	6	5	7	6
Q	(United Kingdom) N Fulwood	6	6	4	2
(United States) P Chamberlin	3	7	6	6

Fourth round
(United States) L Shiras	5	4	6^{4}
(United States) P Chamberlin	7	6	7^{7}

=== Bottom half ===
==== Section 5 ====
First round
5	(United States) J McEnroe	4	4	6	6	8
(Australia) D Cahill	6	6	2	3	6
(United States) R Reneberg	6	6	4	4	6
(West Germany) C Saceanu	4	4	6	6	2
(United States) J Courier	2	6	4	7	7
(United States) R Seguso	6	3	6	5	9
(United States) J Pugh	3	6	6	6
(United States) J Tarango	6	3	1	3
(Sweden) J Svensson	7	7	7
(United States) D Wheaton	6	6	6
(South Africa) P Norval	6	4	6	3
(Australia) C Limberger	7	6	3	6
(United States) G Layendecker	6	7	6
(Argentina) H de la Peña	3	6	0
(Australia) J Fitzgerald	6	7	1	3	6
11	(United States) B Gilbert	2	5	6	6	2

Second round
5	(United States) J McEnroe	6	3	6	7
(United States) R Reneberg	3	6	3	5
(United States) R Seguso	3	6	3
(United States) J Pugh	6	7	6
(Sweden) J Svensson	6	6	7
(Australia) C Limberger	4	3	6
(United States) G Layendecker	6	3	6	3	4
(Australia) J Fitzgerald	4	6	3	6	6

Third round
5	(United States) J McEnroe	6	6	6
(United States) J Pugh	3	4	2
(Sweden) J Svensson	4	4	6
(Australia) J Fitzgerald	6	6	7

Fourth round
5	(United States) J McEnroe	6	0	6	6
(Australia) J Fitzgerald	3	6	4	4

==== Section 6 ====
First round
14	(Soviet Union) A Chesnokov	4	6	0
(Australia) B Drewett	6	7	6
Q	(West Germany) P Baur	2	2	6	6	1
(United States) T Wilkison	6	6	3	3	6
(Mexico) J Lozano	2	4	3
Q	(Canada) M Laurendeau	6	6	6
(Australia) M Woodforde	6	1	4
(South Africa) C van Rensburg	7	6	6
(Australia) J Stoltenberg	7	7	6
WC	(United Kingdom) S Botfield	6	6	3
(Italy) O Camporese	6	6	6
(Sweden) C Bergström	3	4	4
WC	(United Kingdom) J Turner	6	3	6	1	2
(Czechoslovakia) K Nováček	1	6	3	6	6
(Sweden) M Gustafsson	2	2	2
4	(Sweden) M Wilander	6	6	6

Second round
(Australia) B Drewett	6	6	7	6
(United States) T Wilkison	7	3	5	2
Q	(Canada) M Laurendeau	6	6	2	2
(South Africa) C van Rensburg	3	7	6	6
(Australia) J Stoltenberg	7	6	6	1	6
(Italy) O Camporese	5	7	2	6	3
(Czechoslovakia) K Nováček	3	0	3
4	(Sweden) M Wilander	6	6	6

Third round
(Australia) B Drewett	3	6	6	2	8
(South Africa) C van Rensburg	6	2	2	6	10
(Australia) J Stoltenberg	3	3	3
4	(Sweden) M Wilander	6	6	6

Fourth round
(South Africa) C van Rensburg	6	5	5	3
4	(Sweden) M Wilander	3	7	7	6

==== Section 7 ====
First round
8	(United States) T Mayotte	7	6	6
(Italy) P Canè	6	0	1
Q	(Sweden) H Holm	6	6	6
(United Kingdom) N Broad	1	1	1
(United States) P Annacone	6	6	6	5	4
(United States) D Pate	3	7	4	7	6
(Netherlands) T Nijssen	7	6	6
(Austria) H Skoff	5	3	2
(Mexico) L Lavalle	6	4	4	6
(Ecuador) A Gómez	3	6	6	7
Q	(South Africa) M Robertson	5	6	6	4
(Netherlands) M Schapers	7	4	7	6
(Haiti) R Agénor	4	6	6	6
(France) J-P Fleurian	6	3	3	4
Q	(United States) W Scanlon	4	3	6	3
9	(United States) M Chang	6	6	2	6

Second round
8	(United States) T Mayotte	7	6	4	6
Q	(Sweden) H Holm	6	2	6	1
(United States) D Pate	6	2	1	7	15
(Netherlands) T Nijssen	4	6	6	6	13
(Ecuador) A Gómez	6	6	5	6	3
(Netherlands) M Schapers	2	7	7	3	6
(Haiti) R Agénor	6	2	1	5
9	(United States) M Chang	4	6	6	7

Third round
8	(United States) T Mayotte	6	6	6
(United States) D Pate	4	1	3
(Netherlands) M Schapers	6	3	5	5
9	(United States) M Chang	4	6	7	7

Fourth round
8	(United States) T Mayotte	6	6	6
9	(United States) M Chang	3	1	3

==== Section 8 ====
First round
16	(Israel) A Mansdorf	6	6	6
(Spain) S Bruguera	2	1	4
(Soviet Union) A Volkov	5	7	3	2
(West Germany) E Jelen	7	6	6	6
WC	(United Kingdom) N Brown	3	6	3
Q	(United States) G Holmes	6	7	6
(United States) T Witsken	6	6	7
(Sweden) J Carlsson	3	4	6
(United States) S Davis	6	1	6	6
(Soviet Union) A Võsand	4	6	4	4
(South Africa) D Visser	6	7	3	6
(West Germany) C-U Steeb	7	6	6	7
(United States) P Sampras	5	6	7	3
Q	(Australia) T Woodbridge	7	7	5	6
(Canada) C Pridham	3	4	1
2	(Sweden) S Edberg	6	6	6

Second round
16	(Israel) A Mansdorf	4	6	3	6	6
(West Germany) E Jelen	6	3	6	3	2
Q	(United States) G Holmes	5	6	7	4	14
(United States) T Witsken	7	4	6	6	12
(United States) S Davis	7	4	4	6	6
(West Germany) C-U Steeb	5	6	6	2	4
Q	(Australia) T Woodbridge	4	4	6	6
2	(Sweden) S Edberg	6	6	1	7

Third round
16	(Israel) A Mansdorf	6	6	6
Q	(United States) G Holmes	2	4	2
(United States) S Davis	3	4	6	2
2	(Sweden) S Edberg	6	6	4	6

Fourth round
16	(Israel) A Mansdorf	4	3	2
2	(Sweden) S Edberg	6	6	6

Preceded by 1989 French Open	Grand Slams; Men's Singles	Succeeded by 1989 US Open
