= 1989 Wimbledon Championships – Women's doubles =

Women's doubles
- 1989 Wimbledon Championships

Final
- Champions: (Czechoslovakia) Jana Novotná (Czechoslovakia) Helena Suková
- Runners-up: (Soviet Union) Larisa Savchenko (Soviet Union) Natasha Zvereva
- Score: 6–1, 6–2

Details
- Draw: 64 (4Q / 4WC)
- Seeds: 16

Events
Singles	men	women		boys	girls
Doubles	men	women	mixed	boys	girls
WC Singles	men	women	quad
WC Doubles	men	women	quad
Legends	men	women	seniors
← 1988 ·	Wimbledon Championships	· 1990 →

Steffi Graf and Gabriela Sabatini were the defending champions but lost in the quarterfinals to Nicole Provis and Elna Reinach.

Jana Novotná and Helena Suková defeated Larisa Savchenko and Natasha Zvereva in the final, 6–1, 6–2 to win the ladies' doubles tennis title at the 1989 Wimbledon Championships.

== Seeds ==
1. (United States) Martina Navratilova / (United States) Pam Shriver (semifinals)
2. (Soviet Union) Larisa Savchenko / (Soviet Union) Natasha Zvereva (final)
3. (Czechoslovakia) Jana Novotná / (Czechoslovakia) Helena Suková (champions)
4. (United States) Patty Fendick / (Canada) Jill Hetherington (third round)
5. (West Germany) Steffi Graf / (Argentina) Gabriela Sabatini (quarterfinals)
6. (United States) Gigi Fernández / (United States) Lori McNeil (quarterfinals)
7. (United States) Katrina Adams / (United States) Zina Garrison (quarterfinals)
8. (Australia) Elizabeth Smylie / (Australia) Wendy Turnbull (third round)
9. (United States) Elise Burgin / (South Africa) Rosalyn Fairbank (third round)
10. (France) Isabelle Demongeot / (France) Nathalie Tauziat (first round)
11. n/a
12. (Netherlands) Manon Bollegraf / (West Germany) Eva Pfaff (third round)
13. (Australia) Jenny Byrne / (United States) Robin White (third round)
14. (Netherlands) Brenda Schultz / (Hungary) Andrea Temesvári (quarterfinals)
15. (Denmark) Tine Scheuer-Larsen / (France) Catherine Tanvier (first round)
16. (United States) Chris Evert / (Australia) Hana Mandlíková (third round)

Click on the seed number of a player to go to their draw section.

== Draw ==
Key

- Q = Qualifier
- WC = Wild card
- LL = Lucky loser
- Alt = Alternate
- ITF = ITF entry
- PR = Protected ranking
- SR = Special ranking
- SE = Special exempt
- JE = Junior exempt
- JR = Junior Accelerator Programme entrant
- CO = College Accelerator Programme entrant
- NG = Next Gen Accelerator Program entrant
- w/o = Walkover
- r = Retired
- d = Defaulted

=== Finals ===
Quarterfinals
1	(United States) Martina Navratilova (United States) Pam Shriver	7	6	7
14	(Netherlands) Brenda Schultz (Hungary) Andrea Temesvári-Trunkos	5	7	5
3	(Czechoslovakia) Jana Novotná (Czechoslovakia) Helena Suková	1	6	6
6	(United States) Gigi Fernández (United States) Lori McNeil	6	1	4
5	(West Germany) Steffi Graf (Argentina) Gabriela Sabatini	6	4
(Australia) Nicole Provis (South Africa) Elna Reinach	7	6
7	(United States) Katrina Adams (United States) Zina Garrison	3	6
2	(Soviet Union) Larisa Savchenko (Soviet Union) Natasha Zvereva	6	7

Semifinals
1	(United States) Martina Navratilova (United States) Pam Shriver	6	5
3	(Czechoslovakia) Jana Novotná (Czechoslovakia) Helena Suková	7	7
(Australia) Nicole Provis (South Africa) Elna Reinach	2	2
2	(Soviet Union) Larisa Savchenko (Soviet Union) Natasha Zvereva	6	6

Final
3	(Czechoslovakia) Jana Novotná (Czechoslovakia) Helena Suková	6	6
2	(Soviet Union) Larisa Savchenko (Soviet Union) Natasha Zvereva	1	2

=== Top half ===
==== Section 1 ====
First round
1	(United States) M Navratilova (United States) P Shriver	6	6
(Czechoslovakia) I Budařová (Czechoslovakia) R Rajchrtová	0	0
(United States) T Phelps (Italy) R Reggi	6	7
Q	(Japan) R Hiraki (Netherlands) A van Buuren	4	5
Q	(Hong Kong) P Hy (United States) M McGrath	6	1	4
(United States) E Herr (United States) C Reynolds	0	6	6
WC	(United Kingdom) S Gomer (United Kingdom) J Salmon	6	4
9	(United States) E Burgin (South Africa) R Fairbank	7	6
14	(Netherlands) B Schultz (Hungary) A Temesvári	6	6
(Italy) L Golarsa (Socialist Federal Republic of Yugoslavia) S Goleš	3	3
(Australia) L Field (Netherlands) H Witvoet	6	6
LL	(United States) A-M Fernandez (Brazil) T Zambrzycki	1	3
(France) S Amiach (Sweden) M Strandlund	4	6	5
(Australia) A Minter (New Zealand) J Richardson	6	3	7
(United States) Ca MacGregor (United States) Cy MacGregor	7	4	2
8	(Australia) E Smylie (Australia) W Turnbull	6	6	6

Second round
1	(United States) M Navratilova (United States) P Shriver	6	6
(United States) T Phelps (Italy) R Reggi	0	3
(United States) E Herr (United States) C Reynolds	1	5
9	(United States) E Burgin (South Africa) R Fairbank	6	7
14	(Netherlands) B Schultz (Hungary) A Temesvári	6	7
(Australia) L Field (Netherlands) H Witvoet	3	5
(Australia) A Minter (New Zealand) J Richardson	6	3	3
8	(Australia) E Smylie (Australia) W Turnbull	4	6	6

Third round
1	(United States) M Navratilova (United States) P Shriver	6	7
9	(United States) E Burgin (South Africa) R Fairbank	4	6
14	(Netherlands) B Schultz (Hungary) A Temesvári	6	6
8	(Australia) E Smylie (Australia) W Turnbull	1	3

Quarterfinals
1	(United States) M Navratilova (United States) P Shriver	7	6	7
14	(Netherlands) B Schultz (Hungary) A Temesvári	5	7	5

==== Section 2 ====
First round
3	(Czechoslovakia) J Novotná (Czechoslovakia) H Suková	6	6
WC	(United Kingdom) A Grunfeld (United Kingdom) J Louis	1	0
(Netherlands) C Bakkum (Netherlands) N Jagerman	6	6	4
(West Germany) B Bunge (Sweden) C Lindqvist	4	7	6
Q	(Japan) M Kidowaki (Japan) A Nishiya	7	1	2
(United States) B Potter (United States) K Rinaldi	5	6	6
(United States) S Collins (United States) E Hakami	6	2
12	(Netherlands) M Bollegraf (West Germany) E Pfaff	7	6
16	(United States) C Evert (Australia) H Mandlíková	6	6
(United States) C Benjamin (United States) J Kaplan	1	2
(United States) L Allen (United States) M Van Nostrand	3	6	6
(France) A Dechaume (France) E Derly	6	3	4
(South Africa) L Barnard (South Africa) K Schimper	7	6
(United States) M-L Daniels (United States) A Henricksson	6	4
(Spain) A Sánchez Vicario (Austria) J Wiesner	2	2
8	(United States) G Fernández (United States) L McNeil	6	6

Second round
3	(Czechoslovakia) J Novotná (Czechoslovakia) H Suková	7	7
(West Germany) B Bunge (Sweden) C Lindqvist	6	5
(United States) B Potter (United States) K Rinaldi	6	2^{r}
12	(Netherlands) M Bollegraf (West Germany) E Pfaff	7	2
16	(United States) C Evert (Australia) H Mandlíková	6	6
(United States) L Allen (United States) M Van Nostrand	3	3
(South Africa) L Barnard (South Africa) K Schimper	3	2
6	(United States) G Fernández (United States) L McNeil	6	6

Third round
3	(Czechoslovakia) J Novotná (Czechoslovakia) H Suková	6	6
12	(Netherlands) M Bollegraf (West Germany) E Pfaff	1	1
16	(United States) C Evert (Australia) H Mandlíková	4	4
6	(United States) G Fernández (United States) L McNeil	6	6

Quarterfinals
3	(Czechoslovakia) J Novotná (Czechoslovakia) H Suková	1	6	6
6	(United States) G Fernández (United States) L McNeil	6	1	4

=== Bottom half ===
==== Section 3 ====
First round
5	(West Germany) S Graf (Argentina) G Sabatini	6	6
WC	(United Kingdom) J Holden (United Kingdom) C Pollard	2	2
(South Africa) L Gregory (United States) G Magers	6	6
(Australia) J-A Faull (Canada) H Kelesi	1	2
(Italy) M Grossi (Italy) B Romanò	6	4	2
(Austria) H Sprung (United States) K Steinmetz	1	6	6
(France) N Herreman (Argentina) M Paz	4	1
13	(Australia) J Byrne (United States) R White	6	6
10	(France) I Demongeot (France) N Tauziat	3	6	7
(United States) N Hu (United States) S Stafford	6	2	9
(United States) L Antonoplis (Australia) A Scott	6	4	5
(Australia) N Provis (South Africa) E Reinach	3	6	7
(Netherlands) I Driehuis (United States) A Frazier	7	4	4
WC	(United Kingdom) B Borneo (United Kingdom) C Wood	6	6	6
(Poland) I Kuczyńska (Czechoslovakia) J Pospíšilová	3	4
4	(United States) P Fendick (Canada) J Hetherington	6	6

Second round
5	(West Germany) S Graf (Argentina) G Sabatini	6	6
(South Africa) L Gregory (United States) G Magers	3	0
(Austria) H Sprung (United States) K Steinmetz	4	1
13	(Australia) J Byrne (United States) R White	6	6
(United States) N Hu (United States) S Stafford	1	6	3
(Australia) N Provis (South Africa) E Reinach	6	4	6
(United Kingdom) B Borneo (United Kingdom) C Wood	0	2
4	(United States) P Fendick (Canada) J Hetherington	6	6

Third round
5	(West Germany) S Graf (Argentina) G Sabatini	6	6
13	(Australia) J Byrne (United States) R White	2	3
(Australia) N Provis (South Africa) E Reinach	7	4	6
4	(United States) P Fendick (Canada) J Hetherington	5	6	3

Quarterfinals
5	(West Germany) S Graf (Argentina) G Sabatini	6	4
(Australia) N Provis (South Africa) E Reinach	7	6

==== Section 4 ====
First round
7	(United States) K Adams (United States) Z Garrison	6	6
Q	(Australia) K McDonald (Australia) K Radford	4	2
(United States) J Fuchs (United States) J Smoller	4	2
(United States) R Casals (United States) S Walsh-Pete	6	6
(West Germany) C Kohde-Kilsch (West Germany) C Porwik	6	6
(Sweden) M Lindström (United States) H Ludloff	4	4
(United States) M Norwood (United States) J Thomas	6	4	2
LL	(United States) L-A Eldredge (Republic of Ireland) L O'Halloran	1	6	6
15	(Denmark) T Scheuer-Larsen (France) C Tanvier	6	1	4
(United States) P Barg (United States) R Reis	1	6	6
(United States) E Nagelsen (South Africa) D van Rensburg	2	4
(United States) M Louie Harper (United States) W White	6	6
(Japan) N Miyagi (Australia) T Morton	6	3	3
(Australia) M Jaggard (Australia) L O'Neill	2	6	6
(United Kingdom) A Hobbs (France) C Suire	1	3
2	(Soviet Union) L Savchenko (Soviet Union) N Zvereva	6	6

Second round
7	(United States) K Adams (United States) Z Garrison	6	6
(United States) R Casals (United States) S Walsh-Pete	4	3
(West Germany) C Kohde-Kilsch (West Germany) C Porwik	6	6
LL	(United States) L-A Eldredge (Republic of Ireland) L O'Halloran	1	2
(United States) P Barg (United States) R Reis	2	6	1
(United States) M Louie Harper (United States) W White	6	3	6
(Australia) M Jaggard (Australia) L O'Neill	1	5
2	(Soviet Union) L Savchenko (Soviet Union) N Zvereva	6	7

Third round
7	(United States) K Adams (United States) Z Garrison	6	6	6
(West Germany) C Kohde-Kilsch (West Germany) C Porwik	7	3	0
(United States) M Louie Harper (United States) W White	2	1
2	(Soviet Union) L Savchenko (Soviet Union) N Zvereva	6	6

Quarterfinals
7	(United States) K Adams (United States) Z Garrison	3	6
2	(Soviet Union) L Savchenko (Soviet Union) N Zvereva	6	7
