= 1989 Wimbledon Championships – Women's singles =

Women's singles
- 1989 Wimbledon Championships

Final
- Champion: (West Germany) Steffi Graf
- Runner-up: (United States) Martina Navratilova
- Score: 6–2, 6–7^{(1–7)}, 6–1

Details
- Draw: 128 (8 Q / 8 WC )
- Seeds: 16

Events
Singles	men	women		boys	girls
Doubles	men	women	mixed	boys	girls
WC Singles	men	women	quad
WC Doubles	men	women	quad
Legends	men	women	seniors
← 1988 ·	Wimbledon Championships	· 1990 →

Defending champion Steffi Graf defeated Martina Navratilova in a rematch of the previous two years' finals, 6–2, 6–7^{(1–7)}, 6–1 to win the ladies' singles tennis title at the 1989 Wimbledon Championships. It was her second Wimbledon singles title and seventh major singles title overall. This marked the third of three years that Graf and Navratilova contested the Wimbledon final.

In her final Wimbledon appearance, three-time champion Chris Evert reached her 52nd major semifinal, an Open Era women's singles record. She reached the semifinals at the majors all but four times during her career, failing only once at Wimbledon (in 1983).

== Seeds ==
1. (West Germany) Steffi Graf (champion)
2. (United States) Martina Navratilova (final)
3. (Argentina) Gabriela Sabatini (second round)
4. (United States) Chris Evert (semifinals)
5. (United States) Zina Garrison (second round)
6. (Czechoslovakia) Helena Suková (fourth round)
7. (Spain) Arantxa Sánchez Vicario (quarterfinals)
8. (United States) Pam Shriver (third round)
9. (Soviet Union) Natasha Zvereva (third round)
10. (Czechoslovakia) Jana Novotná (fourth round)
11. (Socialist Federal Republic of Yugoslavia) Monica Seles (fourth round)
12. (United States) Mary Joe Fernández (fourth round)
13. (Canada) Helen Kelesi (first round)
14. (Australia) Hana Mandlíková (fourth round)
15. (United States) Lori McNeil (fourth round)
16. (United States) Susan Sloane (second round)

Click on the seed number of a player to go to their draw section.

== Draw ==
=== Key ===
- Q = Qualifier
- WC = Wild card
- LL = Lucky loser
- Alt = Alternate
- ITF = ITF entry
- PR = Protected ranking
- SR = Special ranking
- SE = Special exempt
- JE = Junior exempt
- JR = Junior Accelerator Programme entrant
- CO = College Accelerator Programme entrant
- NG = Next Gen Accelerator Program entrant
- w/o = Walkover
- r = Retired
- d = Defaulted

=== Finals ===
Quarterfinals
1	(West Germany) Steffi Graf	7	6
7	(Spain) Arantxa Sánchez Vicario	5	1
4	(United States) Chris Evert	6	2	7
(Italy) Laura Golarsa	3	6	5
(Sweden) Catarina Lindqvist	7	7
(South Africa) Rosalyn Fairbank	5	5
(United States) Gretchen Magers	1	2
2	(United States) Martina Navratilova	6	6

Semifinals
1	(West Germany) Steffi Graf	6	6
4	(United States) Chris Evert	2	1
(Sweden) Catarina Lindqvist	6	2
2	(United States) Martina Navratilova	7	6

Final
1	(West Germany) Steffi Graf	6	6^{1}	6
2	(United States) Martina Navratilova	2	7^{7}	1

=== Top half ===
==== Section 1 ====
First round
1	(West Germany) S Graf	6	6
WC	(United Kingdom) J Salmon	1	2
(United States) K Kessaris	1	6	6
(France) N Herreman	6	4	3
(France) K Quentrec	6	6
(West Germany) S Hanika	4	2
(Australia) A Minter	6	6
(United States) M Van Nostrand	0	0
(United States) T Phelps	3	6	6
(Poland) I Kuczyńska	6	4	3
(Czechoslovakia) E Švíglerová	6	6
(United States) H Ludloff	3	2
(West Germany) C Porwik	4	6	6
(United States) E Herr	6	4	3
(Netherlands) B Schultz	6	6	4
11	(Socialist Federal Republic of Yugoslavia) M Seles	7	1	6

Second round
1	(West Germany) S Graf	6	6
(United States) K Kessaris	2	1
(France) K Quentrec	2	0
(Australia) A Minter	6	6
(United States) T Phelps	6	5
(Czechoslovakia) E Švíglerová	7	7
(West Germany) C Porwik	2	4
11	(Socialist Federal Republic of Yugoslavia) M Seles	6	6

Third round
1	(West Germany) S Graf	6	6
(Australia) A Minter	1	3
(Czechoslovakia) E Švíglerová	4	3
11	(Socialist Federal Republic of Yugoslavia) M Seles	6	6

Fourth round
1	(West Germany) S Graf	6	6
11	(Socialist Federal Republic of Yugoslavia) M Seles	0	1

==== Section 2 ====
First round
15	(United States) L McNeil	6	6
(Netherlands) N Jagerman	3	1
(United States) B Bowes	6	3
(West Germany) M Pawlik	7	6
(France) P Paradis	4	1
WC	(Australia) W Turnbull	6	6
(United States) A Grossman	6	4
(Austria) J Wiesner	7	6
WC	(United Kingdom) A Grunfeld	4	7	4
Q	(France) S Amiach	6	5	6
(Italy) R Reggi	6	6
(Czechoslovakia) P Langrová	4	0
(France) J Halard	7	7
(Czechoslovakia) R Rajchrtová	5	5
(Czechoslovakia) J Pospíšilová	2	5
7	(Spain) A Sánchez Vicario	6	7

Second round
15	(United States) L McNeil	6	6
(West Germany) M Pawlik	1	3
WC	(Australia) W Turnbull	4	5
(Austria) J Wiesner	6	7
Q	(France) S Amiach	6	4
(Italy) R Reggi	7	6
(France) J Halard	4	3
7	(Spain) A Sánchez Vicario	6	6

Third round
15	(United States) L McNeil	5	6	6
(Austria) J Wiesner	7	2	4
(Italy) R Reggi	6	3	5
7	(Spain) A Sánchez Vicario	4	6	7

Fourth round
15	(United States) L McNeil	3	6	1
7	(Spain) A Sánchez Vicario	6	2	6

==== Section 3 ====
First round
4	(United States) C Evert	6	6
(United States) M Louie Harper	1	1
(United States) M McGrath	4	1
(United States) N Hu	6	6
Q	(Australia) M Jaggard	7	4	4
WC	(United Kingdom) A Hobbs	6	6	6
(South Africa) E Reinach	1	3
LL	(Brazil) G Miró	6	6
Q	(Australia) T Morton	0	2
WC	(United Kingdom) C Wood	6	6
(United States) P Fendick	6	7
Q	(United States) J Smoller	3	5
(United States) G Fernández	7	4	4
(Belgium) A Devries	6	6	6
(United States) S Stafford	7	7
13	(Canada) H Kelesi	6	5

Second round
4	(United States) C Evert	7	6
(United States) N Hu	5	3
WC	(United Kingdom) A Hobbs	5	6	6
LL	(Brazil) G Miró	7	2	4
WC	(United Kingdom) C Wood	1	1
(United States) P Fendick	6	6
(Belgium) A Devries	6	5
(United States) S Stafford	7	7

Third round
4	(United States) C Evert	6	6
WC	(United Kingdom) A Hobbs	4	1
(United States) P Fendick	2	6	6
(United States) S Stafford	6	1	3

Fourth round
4	(United States) C Evert	6	6
(United States) P Fendick	2	2

==== Section 4 ====
First round
10	(Czechoslovakia) J Novotná	6	6
(Canada) R Simpson	2	1
(United States) E Burgin	6	3	6
(United States) E Hakami	4	6	2
LL	(United States) D Graham	4	4
(United States) C Cunningham	6	6
(United States) K Adams	7	6
(South Africa) A Coetzer	5	3
(Italy) L Golarsa	6	6
(Argentina) M Paz	4	1
(United States) E Nagelsen	4	6	3
(Sweden) M Strandlund	6	3	6
(Italy) L Ferrando	4	6	6
(Australia) L Field	6	3	8
Q	(Japan) K Date	1	2
5	(United States) Z Garrison	6	6

Second round
10	(Czechoslovakia) J Novotná	6	3	6
(United States) E Burgin	4	6	2
(United States) C Cunningham	1	2
(United States) K Adams	6	6
(Italy) L Golarsa	6	4	6
(Sweden) M Strandlund	4	6	1
(Australia) L Field	1	6	7
5	(United States) Z Garrison	6	2	5

Third round
10	(Czechoslovakia) J Novotná	6	6
(United States) K Adams	4	1
(Italy) L Golarsa	6	7
(Australia) L Field	4	6

Fourth round
10	(Czechoslovakia) J Novotná	6	6	4
(Italy) L Golarsa	7	2	6

=== Bottom half ===
==== Section 5 ====
First round
6	(Czechoslovakia) H Suková	6	6
(United Kingdom) M Javer	4	4
(South Africa) D van Rensburg	6	6
(Switzerland) E Krapl	3	1
(United States) A Henricksson	6	7
(United States) S Martin	3	6
(West Germany) C Kohde-Kilsch	6	6
(France) N Tauziat	4	2
(France) I Demongeot	6	6
(France) N Guerrée	1	3
(United States) C MacGregor	4	2
(Sweden) C Lindqvist	6	6
(West Germany) E Pfaff	6	6
(United States) W White	4	3
(United States) R Reis	7	2	0
9	(Soviet Union) N Zvereva	6	6	6

Second round
6	(Czechoslovakia) H Suková	6	6
(South Africa) D van Rensburg	3	3
(United States) A Henricksson	4	1
(West Germany) C Kohde-Kilsch	6	6
(France) I Demongeot	3	1
(Sweden) C Lindqvist	6	6
(West Germany) E Pfaff	2	3
9	(Soviet Union) N Zvereva	6	6

Third round
6	(Czechoslovakia) H Suková	4	6	6
(West Germany) C Kohde-Kilsch	6	3	3
(Sweden) C Lindqvist	7	4	6
9	(Soviet Union) N Zvereva	6	6	4

Fourth round
6	(Czechoslovakia) H Suková	4	6
(Sweden) C Lindqvist	6	7

==== Section 6 ====
First round
12	(United States) MJ Fernández	6	7
(United States) M-L Daniels	4	5
(West Germany) S Meier	6	2
(United States) L Allen	7	6
(Japan) A Nishiya	2	3
(France) C Tanvier	6	6
(United States) A Frazier	6	6
WC	(United Kingdom) A Simpkin	2	4
(Denmark) T Scheuer-Larsen	6	6
(Japan) M Yanagi	1	1
(Australia) E Smylie	6	6
(Australia) J Byrne	4	0
(South Africa) R Fairbank	6	6
(New Zealand) J Richardson	4	3
(Australia) D Balestrat	1	0
3	(Argentina) G Sabatini	6	6

Second round
12	(United States) MJ Fernández	6	6
(United States) L Allen	4	1
(France) C Tanvier	6	6
(United States) A Frazier	3	1
(Denmark) T Scheuer-Larsen	1	7	1
(Australia) E Smylie	6	6	6
(South Africa) R Fairbank	6	6
3	(Argentina) G Sabatini	4	3

Third round
12	(United States) MJ Fernández	4	6	6
(France) C Tanvier	6	2	4
(Australia) E Smylie	3	3
(South Africa) R Fairbank	6	6

Fourth round
12	(United States) MJ Fernández	4	6	0
(South Africa) R Fairbank	6	2	6

==== Section 7 ====
First round
8	(United States) P Shriver	6	6
Q	(Netherlands) C Bakkum	2	1
(United States) L-A Eldredge	3	2
(United Kingdom) S Gomer	6	6
WC	(United Kingdom) V Lake	7	3	6
(Socialist Federal Republic of Yugoslavia) S Goleš	6	6	1
(Netherlands) M Bollegraf	6	4
(United States) G Magers	7	6
(Czechoslovakia) I Budařová	6	3	6
(Japan) K Okamoto	4	6	4
(United States) K Rinaldi	6	2	6
(Australia) J-A Faull	4	6	8
WC	(United Kingdom) S Smith	4	2
(Peru) L Gildemeister	6	6
Q	(United States) S Collins	4	0
16	(United States) S Sloane	6	6

Second round
8	(United States) P Shriver	6	3	8
(United Kingdom) S Gomer	4	6	6
WC	(United Kingdom) V Lake	2	3
(United States) G Magers	6	6
(Czechoslovakia) I Budařová	3	0
(Australia) J-A Faull	6	6
(Peru) L Gildemeister	6	7
16	(United States) S Sloane	3	5

Third round
8	(United States) P Shriver	6	2	10
(United States) G Magers	2	6	12
(Australia) J-A Faull	6	7
(Peru) L Gildemeister	3	6

Fourth round
(United States) G Magers	6	6	6
(Australia) J-A Faull	7	1	0

==== Section 8 ====
First round
14	(Australia) H Mandlíková	7	6
(Czechoslovakia) R Zrubáková	5	3
LL	(France) C Suire	1	7	6
(Japan) A Kijimuta	6	5	1
(United States) D Faber	6	2	6
(Soviet Union) L Savchenko	1	6	2
(Australia) J Thompson	6	4	8
(South Africa) K Schimper	1	6	6
(Australia) N Provis	7	7
(United States) C Benjamin	6	6
(United States) R White	7	1	6
(Japan) E Inoue	5	6	2
(Hungary) A Temesvári	3	6
Q	(Australia) K Radford	6	7
(Canada) J Hetherington	3	2
2	(United States) M Navratilova	6	6

Second round
14	(Australia) H Mandlíková	6	6
LL	(France) C Suire	1	4
(United States) D Faber	7	4
(Australia) J Thompson	6	1^{r}
(Australia) N Provis	3	6	6
(United States) R White	6	3	3
Q	(Australia) K Radford	6	3	3
2	(United States) M Navratilova	3	6	6

Third round
14	(Australia) H Mandlíková	6	6
(United States) D Faber	2	4
(Australia) N Provis	0	3
2	(United States) M Navratilova	6	6

Fourth round
14	(Australia) H Mandlíková	3	2
2	(United States) M Navratilova	6	6

Preceded by 1989 French Open – Women's singles	Grand Slam women's singles	Succeeded by 1989 US Open – Women's singles
