= 1989 Wimbledon Championships – Men's doubles =

Men's doubles
- 1989 Wimbledon Championships

Final
- Champions: (Australia) John Fitzgerald (Sweden) Anders Järryd
- Runners-up: (United States) Rick Leach (United States) Jim Pugh
- Score: 3–6, 7–6^{(7–4)}, 6–4, 7–6^{(7–4)}

Details
- Draw: 64 (5 Q / 5 WC )
- Seeds: 16

Events
Singles	men	women		boys	girls
Doubles	men	women	mixed	boys	girls
WC Singles	men	women	quad
WC Doubles	men	women	quad
Legends	men	women	seniors
← 1988 ·	Wimbledon Championships	· 1990 →

Ken Flach and Robert Seguso were the defending champions but lost in the semifinals to John Fitzgerald and Anders Järryd.

Fitzgerald and Järryd defeated Rick Leach and Jim Pugh in the final, 3–6, 7–6^{(7–4)}, 6–4, 7–6^{(7–4)} to win the gentlemen's doubles title at the 1989 Wimbledon Championships.

== Seeds ==
1. (United States) Rick Leach / (United States) Jim Pugh (final)
2. (United States) Ken Flach / (United States) Robert Seguso (semifinals)
3. (Australia) John Fitzgerald / (Sweden) Anders Järryd (champions)
4. (United States) Jim Grabb / (United States) Patrick McEnroe (third round)
5. (Switzerland) Jakob Hlasek / (United States) John McEnroe (third round)
6. (United States) Paul Annacone / (South Africa) Christo van Rensburg (first round)
7. (United States) Kevin Curren / (United States) David Pate (third round)
8. (Mexico) Jorge Lozano / (United States) Todd Witsken (first round)
9. (Australia) Darren Cahill / (Australia) Mark Kratzmann (quarterfinals)
10. (South Africa) Pieter Aldrich / (South Africa) Danie Visser (quarterfinals)
11. (United States) Scott Davis / (United States) Tim Wilkison (second round)
12. (Australia) Peter Doohan / (Australia) Laurie Warder (quarterfinals)
13. (West Germany) Eric Jelen / (Denmark) Michael Mortensen (first round)
14. (Canada) Grant Connell / (Canada) Glenn Michibata (first round)
15. (United States) Jim Courier / (United States) Pete Sampras (third round)
16. (Australia) Brad Drewett / (Australia) Wally Masur (second round)

Click on the seed number of a player to go to their draw section.

== Draw ==
=== Key ===
- Q = Qualifier
- WC = Wild card
- LL = Lucky loser
- Alt = Alternate
- ITF = ITF entry
- PR = Protected ranking
- SR = Special ranking
- SE = Special exempt
- JE = Junior exempt
- JR = Junior Accelerator Programme entrant
- CO = College Accelerator Programme entrant
- NG = Next Gen Accelerator Program entrant
- w/o = Walkover
- r = Retired
- d = Defaulted

=== Finals ===
Quarterfinals
1	(United States) Rick Leach (United States) Jim Pugh	3	7	4	6	6
9	(Australia) Darren Cahill (Australia) Mark Kratzmann	6	5	6	1	3
(Argentina) Javier Frana (Mexico) Leonardo Lavalle	7	7	3	6
12	(Australia) Peter Doohan (Australia) Laurie Warder	6	6	6	3
(United States) Greg Van Emburgh (Australia) Simon Youl	6	4	4
3	(Australia) John Fitzgerald (Sweden) Anders Järryd	7	6	6
10	(South Africa) Pieter Aldrich (South Africa) Danie Visser	7	3	2	5
2	(United States) Ken Flach (United States) Robert Seguso	6	6	6	7

Semifinals
1	(United States) Rick Leach (United States) Jim Pugh	6	6	6
(Argentina) Javier Frana (Mexico) Leonardo Lavalle	3	3	4
3	(Australia) John Fitzgerald (Sweden) Anders Järryd	4	6	6	6
2	(United States) Ken Flach (United States) Robert Seguso	6	2	2	3

Final
1	(United States) Rick Leach (United States) Jim Pugh	6	6^{4}	4	6^{4}
3	(Australia) John Fitzgerald (Sweden) Anders Järryd	3	7^{7}	6	7^{7}

=== Top half ===
==== Section 1 ====
First round
1	(United States) R Leach (United States) J Pugh	7	6	6
(West Germany) C Saceanu (Czechoslovakia) M Šrejber	6	2	4
(Sweden) J Gunnarsson (Sweden) N Kroon	4	2	2
WC	(United Kingdom) N Brown (United Kingdom) N Fulwood	6	6	6
(United States) S DeVries (United States) R Matuszewski	6	3	5	7	3
(Czechoslovakia) J Čihák (Czechoslovakia) C Suk	1	6	7	6	6
(The Bahamas) R Smith (Kenya) P Wekesa	4	4	6
15	(United States) J Courier (United States) P Sampras	6	6	7
9	(Australia) D Cahill (Australia) M Kratzmann	6	6	6
(Mexico) L Herrera (Spain) B Uribe	3	4	3
(Brazil) D Marcelino (Brazil) M Menezes	6	6	6	7
(Italy) P Canè (Italy) U Colombini	2	7	3	6
(Czechoslovakia) J Navrátil (Czechoslovakia) K Nováček	3	3	4
(Socialist Federal Republic of Yugoslavia) G Ivanišević (Venezuela) N Pereira	6	6	6
(New Zealand) K Evernden (United States) J Kriek	6	6	7
8	(Mexico) J Lozano (United States) T Witsken	4	2	5

Second round
1	(United States) R Leach (United States) J Pugh	6	7	6
WC	(United Kingdom) N Brown (United Kingdom) N Fulwood	1	5	4
(Czechoslovakia) J Čihák (Czechoslovakia) C Suk	3	6	6	1
15	(United States) J Courier (United States) P Sampras	6	4	7	6
9	(Australia) D Cahill (Australia) M Kratzmann	6	6	6
(Brazil) D Marcelino (Brazil) M Menezes	3	4	2
(Socialist Federal Republic of Yugoslavia) G Ivanišević (Venezuela) N Pereira	7	2	6	7
(New Zealand) K Evernden (United States) J Kriek	5	6	3	6

Third round
1	(United States) R Leach (United States) J Pugh	7	6	6
15	(United States) J Courier (United States) P Sampras	6	3	4
9	(Australia) D Cahill (Australia) M Kratzmann	6	7	6
(Socialist Federal Republic of Yugoslavia) G Ivanišević (Venezuela) N Pereira	3	6	1

Quarterfinals
1	(United States) R Leach (United States) J Pugh	3	7	4	6	6
9	(Australia) D Cahill (Australia) M Kratzmann	6	5	6	1	3

==== Section 2 ====
First round
4	(United States) J Grabb (United States) P McEnroe	2	6	3	7	7
(West Germany) U Riglewski (Sweden) T Svantesson	6	2	6	6	5
Q	(Brazil) J Daher (Brazil) F Roese	6	6	6
(South Africa) E Edwards (United States) G Holmes	4	4	4
Q	(South Africa) L Bale (Romania) M-I Năstase	4	5	6
(Argentina) J Frana (Mexico) L Lavalle	6	7	7
(United States) J Letts (United States) B Man-Son-Hing	6	2	6	6
13	(West Germany) E Jelen (Denmark) M Mortensen	2	6	4	4
12	(Australia) P Doohan (Australia) L Warder	6	6	6
(United States) J Levine (United States) T Siegel	3	1	1
Q	(United States) B Page (United States) S Warner	3	2	6
WC	(India) V Amritraj (United Kingdom) C Bailey	6	6	7
(Netherlands) M Schapers (West Germany) M Stich	3	4	6
(United States) M De Palmer (United States) G Donnelly	6	6	7
(Austria) A Antonitsch (West Germany) P Baur	3	6	6	3	3
5	(Switzerland) J Hlasek (United States) J McEnroe	6	3	4	6	6

Second round
4	(United States) J Grabb (United States) P McEnroe	6	6	6	6
Q	(Brazil) J Daher (Brazil) F Roese	3	7	4	1
(Argentina) J Frana (Mexico) L Lavalle	6	6	7
(United States) J Letts (United States) B Man-Son-Hing	4	4	6
12	(Australia) P Doohan (Australia) L Warder	7	6	7
WC	(India) V Amritraj (United Kingdom) C Bailey	5	1	6
(United States) M De Palmer (United States) G Donnelly	7	4	6	5	8
5	(Switzerland) J Hlasek (United States) J McEnroe	6	6	3	7	10

Third round
4	(United States) J Grabb (United States) P McEnroe	4	4	4
(Argentina) J Frana (Mexico) L Lavalle	6	6	6
12	(Australia) P Doohan (Australia) L Warder	3	6	4	4
5	(Switzerland) J Hlasek (United States) J McEnroe	6	4	6	2^{r}

Quarterfinals
(Argentina) J Frana (Mexico) L Lavalle	7	7	3	6
12	(Australia) P Doohan (Australia) L Warder	6	6	6	3

=== Bottom half ===
==== Section 3 ====
First round
6	(United States) P Annacone (South Africa) C van Rensburg	5	3	5
WC	(United Kingdom) S Botfield (United Kingdom) J Turner	7	6	7
(United States) G Van Emburgh (Australia) S Youl	7	6	6
(Sweden) R Bergh (United States) B Pearce	6	3	4
(United Kingdom) N Broad (South Africa) S Kruger	6	6	6	6
(United States) K Jones (United States) T Pawsat	4	4	7	3
(United States) B Gilbert (South Africa) G Muller	7	6	6	3	2
11	(United States) S Davis (United States) T Wilkison	6	7	4	6	6
14	(Canada) G Connell (Canada) G Michibata	3	4	6	3
(United States) S Giammalva (United States) G Layendecker	6	6	3	6
(Italy) O Camporese (Italy) D Nargiso	6	7	7	7
(Brazil) C Motta (United States) B Willenborg	7	6	6	6
(Brazil) R Acioly (Brazil) D Campos	1	7	2	4
WC	(United Kingdom) J Lloyd (United Kingdom) S Shaw	6	6	6	6
(United States) M Anger (United States) M Davis	7	4	4	6	16
3	(Australia) J Fitzgerald (Sweden) A Järryd	6	6	6	4	18

Second round
WC	(United Kingdom) S Botfield (United Kingdom) J Turner	6	3	4
(United States) G Van Emburgh (Australia) S Youl	7	6	6
(United Kingdom) N Broad (South Africa) S Kruger	7	6	6
11	(United States) S Davis (United States) T Wilkison	5	2	3
(United States) S Giammalva (United States) G Layendecker	6	6	6
(Italy) O Camporese (Italy) D Nargiso	3	2	4
WC	(United Kingdom) J Lloyd (United Kingdom) S Shaw	w/o
3	(Australia) J Fitzgerald (Sweden) A Järryd

Third round
(United States) G Van Emburgh (Australia) S Youl	7	6	6
(United Kingdom) N Broad (South Africa) S Kruger	6	4	2
(United States) S Giammalva (United States) G Layendecker	6	4	4	6	3
3	(Australia) J Fitzgerald (Sweden) A Järryd	2	6	6	3	6

Quarterfinals
(United States) G Van Emburgh (Australia) S Youl	6	4	4
3	(Australia) J Fitzgerald (Sweden) A Järryd	7	6	6

==== Section 4 ====
First round
7	(United States) K Curren (United States) D Pate	7	7	3	6
(United States) M Flur (United States) J Rive	6	6	6	1
(United Kingdom) J Bates (Sweden) P Lundgren	6	6	1	7	8
Q	(India) Z Ali (United States) J Canter	7	3	6	6	10
(Czechoslovakia) S Birner (Czechoslovakia) R Vogel	2	5	2
(Australia) B Dyke (Netherlands) T Nijssen	6	7	6
(Sweden) R Båthman (Spain) T Carbonell	3	4	1
10	(South Africa) P Aldrich (South Africa) D Visser	6	6	6
16	(Australia) B Drewett (Australia) W Masur	6	6	6
WC	(United Kingdom) D Felgate (United Kingdom) J Goodall	1	3	2
(West Germany) P Kühnen (West Germany) C-U Steeb	3	6	3
Q	(France) G Raoux (France) É Winogradsky	6	7	6
(Czechoslovakia) M Mečíř (Australia) M Woodforde	5	6	6	7
(Sweden) M Gustafsson (Finland) O Rahnasto	7	4	4	6
(United Kingdom) A Castle (United States) R Van't Hof	6	6	4	3
2	(United States) K Flach (United States) R Seguso	3	7	6	6

Second round
7	(United States) K Curren (United States) D Pate	6	3	6	7
Q	(India) Z Ali (United States) J Canter	3	6	3	6
(Australia) B Dyke (Netherlands) T Nijssen	7	6	6	3
10	(South Africa) P Aldrich (South Africa) D Visser	6	7	7	6
16	(Australia) B Drewett (Australia) W Masur	2	4	6	6	3
Q	(France) G Raoux (France) É Winogradsky	6	6	1	2	6
(Czechoslovakia) M Mečíř (Australia) M Woodforde	6	7	3	4	6
2	(United States) K Flach (United States) R Seguso	3	6	6	6	8

Third round
7	(United States) K Curren (United States) D Pate	7	7	6	6	2
10	(South Africa) P Aldrich (South Africa) D Visser	6	6	7	7	6
Q	(France) G Raoux (France) É Winogradsky	7	2	6	3	4
2	(United States) K Flach (United States) R Seguso	6	6	3	6	6

Quarterfinals
10	(South Africa) P Aldrich (South Africa) D Visser	7	3	2	5
2	(United States) K Flach (United States) R Seguso	6	6	6	7
