= Nick Fulwood =

British tennis player

- Full name: Nicholas Fullwood
- Country (sports): United Kingdom
- Born: 2 October 1963 (age 62) Risley, Derbyshire, UK
- Height: 185 cm (6 ft 1 in)
- Plays: Right-handed
- Prize money: $98,425

Singles
- Career record: 5–13
- Career titles: 0
- Highest ranking: No. 176 (10 July 1989)

Grand Slam singles results
- Australian Open: 2R (1987)
- Wimbledon: 3R (1989)

Doubles
- Career record: 7–18
- Career titles: 0
- Highest ranking: No. 118 (26 February 1990)

Grand Slam doubles results
- Australian Open: 1R (1987)
- French Open: 1R (1990)
- Wimbledon: 2R (1988, 1989, 1990, 1991)

Mixed doubles

Grand Slam mixed doubles results
- Wimbledon: 2R (1985, 1988)

Nick Fulwood (born 2 October 1963) is a retired British tennis player who reached the third round of the 1989 Wimbledon Championships, where he defeated Jonathan Canter and compatriot Mark Petchey before losing to Paul Chamberlin.

== Coaching career ==
In 1999, he was the coach of Derby-based Russian tennis player Julia Lutrova.
