= 1989 Wimbledon Championships =

- Date: 26 June – 9 July
- Edition: 103rd
- Category: Grand Slam
- Draw: 128S/64D/64XD
- Prize money: £3,133,749
- Surface: Grass
- Location: Church Road; SW19, Wimbledon, London, United Kingdom
- Venue: All England Lawn Tennis and Croquet Club

Champions

Men's singles
- (West Germany) Boris Becker

Women's singles
- (West Germany) Steffi Graf

Men's doubles
- (Australia) John Fitzgerald / (Sweden) Anders Järryd

Women's doubles
- (Czechoslovakia) Jana Novotná / (Czechoslovakia) Helena Suková

Mixed doubles
- (United States) Jim Pugh / (Czechoslovakia) Jana Novotná

Boys' singles
- (Sweden) Nicklas Kulti

Girls' singles
- (Czechoslovakia) Andrea Strnadová

Boys' doubles
- (United States) Jared Palmer / (United States) Jonathan Stark

Girls' doubles
- (United States) Jennifer Capriati / (United States) Meredith McGrath
← 1988 ·	Wimbledon Championships	· 1990 →

The 1989 Wimbledon Championships was a tennis tournament played on grass courts at the All England Lawn Tennis and Croquet Club in Wimbledon, London in the United Kingdom. It was the 103rd edition of the Wimbledon Championships and were held from 26 June to 9 July 1989.

== Prize money ==
The total prize money for 1989 championships was £3,133,749. The winner of the men's title earned £190,000 while the women's singles champion earned £171,000.

Event	W	F	SF	QF	Round of 16	Round of 32	Round of 64	Round of 128
Men's singles	£190,000	£95,000	£47,500	£24,065	£12,665	£7,095	£4,180	£2,550
Women's singles	£171,000	£85,500	£41,560	£20,455	£10,135	£5,500	£3,240	£1,975
Men's doubles *	£65,870	£32,930	£16,470	£8,360	£4,310	£2,280	£1,330	—
Women's doubles *	£56,970	£28,490	£13,170	£6,690	£3,230	£1,710	£960	—
Mixed doubles *	£34,200	£17,100	£8,550	£3,930	£1,970	£980	£440	—

_{* per team}

== Champions ==
=== Seniors ===
==== Men's singles ====
(West Germany) Boris Becker defeated (Sweden) Stefan Edberg, 6–0, 7–6^{(7–1)}, 6–4

- It was Becker's 3rd career Grand Slam title and his 3rd and last Wimbledon title.

==== Women's singles ====
(West Germany) Steffi Graf defeated (United States) Martina Navratilova, 6–2, 6–7^{(1–7)}, 6–1

- It was Graf's 7th career Grand Slam title and her 2nd Wimbledon title.

==== Men's doubles ====
(Australia) John Fitzgerald / (Sweden) Anders Järryd defeated (United States) Rick Leach / (United States) Jim Pugh, 3–6, 7–6^{(7–4)}, 6–4, 7–6^{(7–4)}

- It was Fitzgerald's 5th career Grand Slam title and his 1st Wimbledon title. It was Järryd's 5th career Grand Slam title and his 1st Wimbledon title.

==== Women's doubles ====
(Czechoslovakia) Jana Novotná / (Czechoslovakia) Helena Suková defeated (Soviet Union) Larisa Savchenko / (Soviet Union) Natasha Zvereva, 6–1, 6–2

- It was Novotná's 4th career Grand Slam title and her 1st Wimbledon title. It was Suková's 3rd career Grand Slam title and her 2nd Wimbledon title.

==== Mixed doubles ====
(United States) Jim Pugh / (Czechoslovakia) Jana Novotná defeated (Australia) Mark Kratzmann / (Australia) Jenny Byrne, 6–4, 5–7, 6–4

- It was Novotná's 5th career Grand Slam title and her 2nd Wimbledon title. It was Pugh's 3rd career Grand Slam title and his 1st Wimbledon title.

=== Juniors ===
==== Boys' singles ====
(Sweden) Nicklas Kulti defeated (Australia) Todd Woodbridge, 6–4, 6–3

==== Girls' singles ====
(Czechoslovakia) Andrea Strnadová defeated (United States) Meredith McGrath, 6–2, 6–3

==== Boys' doubles ====
(United States) Jared Palmer / (United States) Jonathan Stark defeated (South Africa) John-Laffnie de Jager / (South Africa) Wayne Ferreira, 7–6^{(7–4)}, 7–6^{(7–2)}

==== Girls' doubles ====
(United States) Jennifer Capriati / (United States) Meredith McGrath defeated (Czechoslovakia) Andrea Strnadová / (Czechoslovakia) Eva Švíglerová, 6–4, 6–2

== Singles seeds ==
=== Men's singles ===
1. (Czechoslovakia) Ivan Lendl (semifinals, lost to Boris Becker)
2. (Sweden) Stefan Edberg (final, lost to Boris Becker)
3. (West Germany) Boris Becker (champion)
4. (Sweden) Mats Wilander (quarterfinals, lost to John McEnroe)
5. (United States) John McEnroe (semifinals, lost to Stefan Edberg)
6. (Switzerland) Jakob Hlasek (first round, lost to Thomas Högstedt)
7. (Czechoslovakia) Miloslav Mečíř (third round, lost to Slobodan Živojinović)
8. (United States) Tim Mayotte (quarterfinals, lost to Stefan Edberg)
9. (United States) Michael Chang (fourth round, lost to Tim Mayotte)
10. (United States) Jimmy Connors (second round, lost to Dan Goldie)
11. (United States) Brad Gilbert (first round, lost to John Fitzgerald)
12. (United States) Kevin Curren (third round, lost to Leif Shiras)
13. (United States) Aaron Krickstein (fourth round, lost to Boris Becker)
14. (Soviet Union) Andrei Chesnokov (first round, lost to Brad Drewett)
15. (Sweden) Mikael Pernfors (second round, lost to Peter Lundgren)
16. (Israel) Amos Mansdorf (fourth round, lost to Stefan Edberg)

=== Women's singles ===
1. (West Germany) Steffi Graf (champion)
2. (United States) Martina Navratilova (final, lost to Steffi Graf)
3. (Argentina) Gabriela Sabatini (second round, lost to Rosalyn Fairbank)
4. (United States) Chris Evert (semifinals, lost to Steffi Graf)
5. (United States) Zina Garrison (second round, lost to Louise Field)
6. (Czechoslovakia) Helena Suková (fourth round, lost to Catarina Lindqvist)
7. (Spain) Arantxa Sánchez Vicario (quarterfinals, lost to Steffi Graf)
8. (United States) Pam Shriver (third round, lost to Gretchen Magers)
9. (Soviet Union) Natasha Zvereva (third round, lost to Catarina Lindqvist)
10. (Czechoslovakia) Jana Novotná (fourth round, lost to Laura Golarsa)
11. (Socialist Federal Republic of Yugoslavia) Monica Seles (fourth round, lost to Steffi Graf)
12. (United States) Mary Joe Fernández (fourth round, lost to Rosalyn Fairbank)
13. (Canada) Helen Kelesi (first round, lost to Shaun Stafford)
14. (Australia) Hana Mandlíková (fourth round, lost to Martina Navratilova)
15. (United States) Lori McNeil (fourth round, lost to Arantxa Sánchez Vicario)
16. (United States) Susan Sloane (second round, lost to Laura Gildemeister)

Preceded by 1989 French Open	Grand Slams	Succeeded by 1989 US Open
