= Óscar Bustos =

Chilean tennis player

- Country (sports): Chile
- Born: 26 August 1971 (age 54)

Singles
- Highest ranking: No. 328 (11 Nov 1991)

Grand Slam singles results
- Wimbledon: Q1 (1992)

Doubles
- Highest ranking: No. 371 (25 May 1992)

Grand Slam doubles results
- Wimbledon: Q1 (1992)

Óscar Bustos (born 26 August 1971) is a Chilean former professional tennis player.

Bustos played collegiate tennis for Arizona State University, earning PAC-10 All-Conference first team selection in 1996.

A member of the Chile Davis Cup team in 1996 and 1997, Bustos had a singles win over Canada's Andrew Sznajder and was the doubles partner of Marcelo Ríos in three rubbers.

He reached a career-high singles ranking of World No. 328.

== See also ==
- List of Chile Davis Cup team representatives
