= Jan Kodeš Jr. =

Czech tennis player (born 1972)

Jan Kodeš
- Full name: Jan Kodeš Jr.
- Country (sports): Czechoslovakia (1990-1992); Czech Republic (from 1993)
- Born: 11 March 1972 (age 53); Prague, Czechoslovakia
- Prize money: $59,054

Singles
- Career record: 1–5
- Career titles: 0
- Highest ranking: No. 324 (6 May 1991)

Doubles
- Career record: 9–13
- Career titles: 0
- Highest ranking: No. 140 (22 May 1995)

Grand Slam doubles results
- French Open: 1R (1995)

Jan Kodeš Jr. (born 11 March 1972) is a former professional tennis player from the Czech Republic.

== Biography ==
Born in Prague, he is the son of Czech tennis great Jan Kodeš.

A highly rated junior in the late 1980s, at his peak he was the number two junior in Czechoslovakia, behind Martin Damm. It was with Damm that he made the boys doubles final at the 1989 US Open, which they lost to South Africans Wayne Ferreira and Grant Stafford. He was the Czechoslovak national junior champion in 1989.

Kodeš turned professional in 1990 and in his first year on tour made the second round at Prague, with a win over Cédric Pioline. In 1991 he defeated Thomas Enqvist to win the Prague Challenger. He won two further Challenger titles during his career, both in doubles. As a doubles player he twice made the semi-finals of ATP Tour tournaments, at Prague in 1993 and Ostrava in 1994, both beside Tomáš Anzari. He also competed in the main draw of the doubles at the 1995 French Open, with countryman Damm.

== Challenger titles ==
=== Singles: (1) ===
No.	Year	Tournament	Surface	Opponent	Score
1.	1991	Prague, Czechoslovakia	Clay	(Sweden) Thomas Enqvist	5–7, 6–4, 6–1

=== Doubles: (2) ===
No.	Year	Tournament	Surface	Partner	Opponents	Score
1.	1994	Rogaška, Slovenia	Carpet	(Czech Republic) Tomáš Anzari	(United Kingdom) Barry Cowan (United Kingdom) Andrew Richardson	6–4, 6–3
2.	1996	Plzeň, Czech Republic	Clay	(Czech Republic) Petr Luxa	(Argentina) Franco Davín (Argentina) Martín Rodríguez	1–6, 6–2, 7–5
