= Eva Švíglerová =

Czech tennis player

- Country (sports): Czechoslovakia (1987–92); Czech Republic (1993–94)
- Born: 13 July 1971 (age 53)
- Turned pro: 1987
- Retired: 1994
- Plays: Right-handed
- Prize money: US$278,911

Singles
- Career record: 114–89
- Career titles: 1 WTA, 5 ITF
- Highest ranking: No. 33 (21 October 1991)

Grand Slam singles results
- Australian Open: 1R (1989–92)
- French Open: 3R (1990)
- Wimbledon: 3R (1989)
- US Open: 3R (1991)

Doubles
- Career record: 45–78
- Career titles: 1
- Highest ranking: No. 75 (12 April 1993)
- Last updated on: 25 January 2012.

Eva Švíglerová (born 13 July 1971) is a Czech former professional tennis player. She enjoyed success as a junior player, winning the 1989 Australian Open in girls' doubles, along with Andrea Strnadová. The two were also the finalists of the 1989 Wimbledon Championships. At this event, it was rumoured by some reporters that she played one match in the tournament without knickers.

The same year, Švíglerová reached the final in girls' singles of the French Open, losing to future World No. 1 player Jennifer Capriati 6–4, 6–0.

As a professional, Švíglerová won one WTA title, the ASB Classic in 1991. From 1988 to 1993, she also won five additional ITF titles. In doubles, Švíglerová won the Brasil Open in 1991 partnering with Bettina Fulco. She achieved her career–high singles ranking, World No. 33, on 21 October 1991.

== Career statistics ==
=== WTA singles finals: 1 (1–0) ===
Legend
Grand Slam (0–0)
Tour Championships (0–0)
Tier I (0–0)
Tier II (0–0)
Tier III (0–0)
Tier IV & V (1–0)

Result	W/L	Date	Tournament	Surface	Opponent	Score
Win	1–0	Feb 1991	Auckland, New Zealand	Hard	(Czech Republic) Andrea Strnadová	6–2, 0–6, 6–1

=== WTA doubles finals: 2 (1–1) ===
Legend
Grand Slam (0–0)
Tour Championships (0–0)
Tier I (0–0)
Tier II (0–0)
Tier III (0–0)
Tier IV & V (1–1)

Result	W/L	Date	Tournament	Surface	Partner	Opponents	Score
Win	1–0	Dec 1990	São Paulo, Brazil	Clay	(Argentina) Bettina Fulco	(France) Mary Pierce (United States) Luanne Spadea	7–5, 6–4
Loss	1–1	July 1991	Prague, Czechoslovakia	Clay	(France) Noëlle van Lottum	(Austria) Karin Kschwendt (Austria) Petra Ritter	4–6, 6–2, 5–7

=== ITF singles finals: 6 (5–1) ===
$100,000 tournaments
$75,000 tournaments
$50,000 tournaments
$25,000 tournaments
$10,000 tournaments

Result	No.	Date	Tournament	Surface	Opponent	Score
Loss	1.	Jun 1988	Arezzo, Italy	Clay	(Italy) Marzia Grossi	6(0)–7, 1–6
Win	1.	Aug 1988	Caserta, Italy	Clay	(Australia) Kristine Radford	6–3, 7–5
Win	2.	Oct 1988	Šibenik, Yugoslavia	Clay	(Poland) Magdalena Feistel	7–5, 6–4
Win	3.	Oct 1988	Makarska, Yugoslavia	Clay	(Czechoslovakia) Renata Šmekálová	6–2, 6–1
Win	4.	Nov 1988	Wels, Austria	Clay (i)	(Austria) Marion Maruska	6–3, 6–1
Win	5.	Jul 1993	Rheda-Wiedenbrück, Germany	Clay	(Germany) Katja Oeljeklaus	6–4, 6–4

=== ITF doubles finals: 1 (0–1) ===
$100,000 tournaments
$75,000 tournaments
$50,000 tournaments
$25,000 tournaments
$10,000 tournaments

Result	No.	Date	Tournament	Surface	Partner	Opponents	Score
Loss	1.	26 September 1988	Bol, Yugoslavia	Clay	(Czech Republic) Magdalena Šimková	(Australia) Kate McDonald (Australia) Rennae Stubbs	3–6, 1–6

=== Junior Grand Slam singles finals: 1 (0–1) ===
Result	Year	Championship	Surface	Opponent	Score
Loss	1989	French Open	Clay	(United States) Jennifer Capriati	4–6, 0–6

=== Junior Grand Slam doubles finals: 2 (1–1) ===
Result	Year	Championship	Surface	Partner	Opponents	Score
Win	1989	Australian Open	Hard	(Czech Republic) Andrea Strnadová	(Australia) Nicole Pratt (Australia) Angie Woolcock	6–2, 6–0
Loss	1989	Wimbledon	Grass	(Czech Republic) Andrea Strnadová	(United States) Jennifer Capriati (United States) Meredith McGrath	4–6, 2–6

== Grand Slam performance timeline ==
Key
W	F	SF	QF	#R	RR	Q#	DNQ	A	NH

(W) winner; (F) finalist; (SF) semifinalist; (QF) quarterfinalist; (#R) rounds 4, 3, 2, 1; (RR) round-robin stage; (Q#) qualification round; (DNQ) did not qualify; (A) absent; (NH) not held; (SR) strike rate (events won / competed); (W–L) win–loss record.

Year	Australian Open		French Open		Wimbledon		US Open	
1989	1R	(Spain) C. Martínez	—		3R	(Socialist Federal Republic of Yugoslavia) M. Seles	—	
1990	1R	(United States) P. Shriver	3R	(Czech Republic) J. Novotná	1R	(France) C. Tanvier	1R	(South Africa) D. Van Rensburg
1991	1R	(United States) A. Smith	1R	(Czech Republic) H. Suková	1R	(Germany) W. Probst	3R	(Germany) S. Graf
1992	1R	(United States) S. Rehe	1R	(Germany) V. Martinek	1R	(Germany) S. Frankl	1R	(Canada) P. Hy
