= Bret Richardson =

Australian tennis player

- Country (sports): Australia
- Born: 23 January 1971 (age 55) Launceston, Australia
- Height: 178 cm (5 ft 10 in)
- Prize money: $13,676

Singles
- Career record: 0–2
- Highest ranking: No. 361 (4 Nov 1991)

Grand Slam singles results
- Australian Open: Q1 (1989, 90, 91, 92, 93)

Doubles
- Career record: 0–1
- Highest ranking: No. 288 (4 May 1992)

Grand Slam doubles results
- Australian Open: 1R (1993)
- Wimbledon: Q2 (1990)

Bret Richardson (born 23 January 1971) is an Australian former professional tennis player.

Richardson, a Tasmanian, was ranked amongst the world's top 20 juniors. He competed on the professional tour in the early 1990s and reached a best world ranking of 361, with two main draw appearances at the ATP Tour's Queensland Open. In 1993 he featured in the men's doubles main draw of the Australian Open.

== ATP Challenger finals ==
=== Doubles: 1 (0–1) ===
Result	Date	Tournament	Surface	Partner	Opponents	Score
Loss	Nov 1991	Tasmania, Australia	Carpet	(Australia) Simon Youl	(Australia) Michael Brown (Australia) Andrew Kratzmann	6–3, 3–6, 6–7
