= Michelle Oldham =

British tennis player

- Country (sports): Great Britain
- Born: 2 April 1972 (age 52)

Singles
- Highest ranking: No. 657 (5 March 1990)

Doubles
- Highest ranking: No. 522 (6 November 1989)

Grand Slam doubles results
- US Open: 1R (1993)

Michelle Oldham (born 2 April 1972) is a British former professional tennis player.

A native of Surrey in England, Oldham was coached by Chris Lane and won a British under 18 grass-court championship in doubles. She featured in the women's doubles main draw of the 1993 US Open.

Oldham played collegiate tennis in the United States for the University of Arizona and in 1993 partnered with Alix Creek to win the NCAA Division I doubles championship. The pair, who had entered the tournament as the worst ranked team, were the first players from the college to claim a women's tennis national title. She was a two-time ITA All-American and is a member of the University of Arizona's Sports Hall of Fame.
