= 1989 Federation Cup (tennis) =

International women's tennis competition

Details
- Duration: 1–9 October
- Edition: 27th

Champion
- Winning nation: United States

The 1989 Federation Cup was the 27th edition of the most important competition between national teams in women's tennis. The tournament was held at Ariake Tennis Forest Park in Tokyo, Japan, from 1–9 October. The United States won the tournament without losing a rubber, defeating Spain in the final (in what was only Spain's first semifinal and second quarterfinal appearance), giving the USA their 13th title.

== Qualifying round ==
All ties were played at Ariake Tennis Forest Park in Tokyo, Japan, on hard courts.

Winning team	Score	Losing team
South Korea	3–0	Israel
Yugoslavia	3–0	Jamaica
Thailand	2–1	Malta
China	2–1	Luxembourg
Mexico	2–1	Chinese Taipei
Philippines	2–1	Ireland
Indonesia	3–0	Malaysia
Poland	3–0	Singapore

Winning nations advance to Main Draw, losing nations play in Consolation Qualifying round.

=== South Korea vs. Israel ===
South Korea
3
Ariake Coliseum, Tokyo, Japan
October 1989
Hard (outdoors)

Israel
0

			1	2	3
1	(South Korea) (Israel)	Im Sook-ja; Hagit Ohayon	6; 4	6; 2
2	(South Korea) (Israel)	Kim Il-soon; Ilana Berger	7^{7} 6^{5}	6^{4} 7^{7}	6; 3
3	(South Korea) (Israel)	Kim Il-soon / Lee Jeong-myung; Rona Mayer / Limor Zaltz	6^{4} 7^{7}	6; 4	6; 3

=== Yugoslavia vs. Jamaica ===
Yugoslavia
3
Ariake Coliseum, Tokyo, Japan
October 1989
Hard (outdoors)

Jamaica
0

			1	2	3
1	(Socialist Federal Republic of Yugoslavia) (Jamaica)	Nadin Ercegović; Camille Walter	6; 1	6; 0
2	(Socialist Federal Republic of Yugoslavia) (Jamaica)	Sabrina Goleš; Joni Van Ryck De Groot	6; 0	6; 2
3	(Socialist Federal Republic of Yugoslavia) (Jamaica)	Sabrina Goleš / Mima Jaušovec; Deanne Bell / Joni Van Ryck De Groot	6; 1	6; 0

=== Thailand vs. Malta ===
Thailand
2
Ariake Coliseum, Tokyo, Japan
October 1989
Hard (outdoors)

Malta
1

			1	2	3
1	(Thailand) (Malta)	Orawan Thampensri; Carol Cassar-Torreggiani	4; 6	4; 6
2	(Thailand) (Malta)	Tossaporn Summa; Katherine Camilleri	4; 6	6; 0	6; 1
3	(Thailand) (Malta)	Tossaporn Summa / Orawan Thampensri; Carol Cassar-Torreggiani / Alexia Gera	6; 3	7^{7} 6^{1}

=== China vs. Luxembourg ===
China
2
Ariake Coliseum, Tokyo, Japan
October 1989
Hard (outdoors)

Luxembourg
1

			1	2	3
1	(China) (Luxembourg)	Tang Min; Marie-Christine Goy	6; 2	6; 3
2	(China) (Luxembourg)	Chen Li-Ling; Karin Kschwendt	3; 6	1; 6
3	(China) (Luxembourg)	Li Fang / Tang Min; Marie-Christine Goy / Karin Kschwendt	6^{7} 7^{9}	6; 4	6; 2

=== Mexico vs. Chinese Taipei ===
Mexico
2
Ariake Coliseum, Tokyo, Japan
October 1989
Hard (outdoors)

Chinese Taipei
1

			1	2	3
1	(Mexico) (Chinese Taipei)	Claudia Hernández; Lai Su-lin	6; 1	6; 0
2	(Mexico) (Chinese Taipei)	Xóchitl Escobedo; Wang Shi-ting	6; 3	6; 4
3	(Mexico) (Chinese Taipei)	Aránzazu Gallardo / Maluca Llamas; Lai Su-lin / Wang Shi-ting	0; 6	1; 6

=== Philippines vs. Ireland ===
Philippines
2
Ariake Coliseum, Tokyo, Japan
October 1989
Hard (outdoors)

Ireland
1

			1	2	3
1	(Philippines) (Republic of Ireland)	Dyan Castillejo; Gina Niland	6; 0	1; 6	6; 3
2	(Philippines) (Republic of Ireland)	Sarah Castillejo; Lesley O'Halloran	4; 6	6; 2	6; 2
3	(Philippines) (Republic of Ireland)	Dyan Castillejo / Dorothy Jane Suarez; Jennifer O'Brien / Lesley O'Halloran	2; 6	3; 6

=== Indonesia vs. Malaysia ===
Indonesia
3
Ariake Coliseum, Tokyo, Japan
October 1989
Hard (outdoors)

Malaysia
0

			1	2	3
1	(Indonesia) (Malaysia)	Yayuk Basuki; Kam Shu-shin	6; 0	6; 0
2	(Indonesia) (Malaysia)	Suzanna Anggarkusuma; Kerry Anne Lim	6; 0	6; 0
3	(Indonesia) (Malaysia)	Lukky Tedjamukti / Waya Walalangi; Kam Shu-shin / Kerry Anne Lim	6; 1	6; 1

=== Poland vs. Singapore ===
Poland
3
Ariake Coliseum, Tokyo, Japan
October 1989
Hard (outdoors)

Singapore
0

			1	2	3
1	(Poland) (Singapore)	Magdalena Feistel; Valerie Tan	6; 1	6; 0
2	(Poland) (Singapore)	Katarzyna Nowak; Lena Zainal	6; 2	6; 4
3	(Poland) (Singapore)	Sylwia Czopek / Magdalena Feistel; Nozelina Lukeman / Lena Zainal	6; 3	6; 4

== Main draw ==
Participating Teams
Argentina	Australia	Austria	Belgium	Brazil	Bulgaria	Canada	China
Czechoslovakia	Denmark	Finland	France	Great Britain	Greece	Hungary	Indonesia
Italy	Japan	Mexico	Netherlands	New Zealand	Philippines	Poland	South Korea
Soviet Union	Spain	Sweden	Switzerland	Thailand	United States	West Germany	Yugoslavia

First Round
Czechoslovakia	3
Belgium	0
Q	Thailand	0
Hungary	3
Sweden	0
Japan	3
Finland	0
West Germany	3
Austria	2
Q	Mexico	1
Q	Indonesia	0
Great Britain	3
United States	3
Greece	0
Q	Poland	0
Denmark	3
Australia	3
Q	China	0
Italy	1
New Zealand	2
Q	South Korea	0
Bulgaria	3
Q	Philippines	0
Argentina	2
Spain	2
France	0
Q	Yugoslavia	0
Netherlands	2
Canada	2
Brazil	1
Switzerland	0
Soviet Union	2

Second Round
Czechoslovakia	2
Hungary	1
Japan	0
West Germany	3
Austria	2
Great Britain	1
United States	3
Denmark	0
Australia	3
New Zealand	0
Bulgaria	3
Argentina	0
Spain	2
Netherlands	0
Canada	1
Soviet Union	2

Quarterfinals
Czechoslovakia	2
West Germany	1
Austria	0
United States	3
Australia	2
Bulgaria	1
Spain	2
Soviet Union	1

Semifinals
Czechoslovakia	0
United States	2
Australia	0
Spain	2

Final
United States	3
Spain	0

1st Round losing teams play in Consolation Rounds

=== First round ===
==== Czechoslovakia vs. Belgium ====
Czechoslovakia
3
Ariake Coliseum, Tokyo, Japan
October 1989
Hard (outdoors)

Belgium
0

			1	2	3
1	(Czechoslovakia) (Belgium)	Jana Novotná; Caroline van Renterghem	6; 0	6; 2
2	(Czechoslovakia) (Belgium)	Helena Suková; Sabine Appelmans	6; 4	6; 1
3	(Czechoslovakia) (Belgium)	Jana Pospíšilová / Regina Rajchrtová; Sabine Appelmans / Caroline van Renterghem	7^{10} 6^{8}	1; 6	6; 3

==== Thailand vs. Hungary ====
Thailand
0
Ariake Coliseum, Tokyo, Japan
October 1989
Hard (outdoors)

Hungary
3

			1	2	3
1	(Thailand) (Hungary)	Orawan Thampensri; Andrea Noszály	1; 6	1; 6
2	(Thailand) (Hungary)	Tossaporn Summa; Andrea Temesvári	1; 6	1; 6
3	(Thailand) (Hungary)	Tossaporn Summa / Orawan Thampensri; Réka Szikszay / Andrea Temesvári	3; 6	4; 6

==== Sweden vs. Japan ====
Sweden
0
Ariake Coliseum, Tokyo, Japan
October 1989
Hard (outdoors)

Japan
3

			1	2	3
1	(Sweden) (Japan)	Cecilia Dahlman; Nana Miyagi	6; 1	1; 6	2; 6
2	(Sweden) (Japan)	Catarina Lindqvist; Akiko Kijimuta	2; 6	2; 6
3	(Sweden) (Japan)	Catarina Lindqvist / Maria Strandlund; Kimiko Date / Etsuko Inoue	5; 7	2; 6

==== Finland vs. West Germany ====
Finland
0
Ariake Coliseum, Tokyo, Japan
October 1989
Hard (outdoors)

West Germany
3

			1	2	3
1	(Finland) (West Germany)	Nanne Dahlman; Claudia Kohde-Kilsch	5; 7	4; 6
2	(Finland) (West Germany)	Anne Aallonen; Steffi Graf	0; 6	1; 6
3	(Finland) (West Germany)	Anne Aallonen / Nanne Dahlman; Bettina Bunge / Isabel Cueto	2; 6	3; 6

==== Austria vs. Mexico ====
Austria
2
Ariake Coliseum, Tokyo, Japan
October 1989
Hard (outdoors)

Mexico
1

			1	2	3
1	(Austria) (Mexico)	Judith Wiesner; Claudia Hernández	6; 4	6; 0
2	(Austria) (Mexico)	Barbara Paulus; Xóchitl Escobedo	6; 3	4; 6	3; 6
3	(Austria) (Mexico)	Barbara Paulus / Judith Wiesner; Xóchitl Escobedo / Claudia Hernández	6; 3	6; 4

==== Indonesia vs. Great Britain ====
Indonesia
0
Ariake Coliseum, Tokyo, Japan
October 1989
Hard (outdoors)

Great Britain
3

			1	2	3
1	(Indonesia) (United Kingdom)	Suzanna Anggarkusuma; Clare Wood	2; 6	1; 6
2	(Indonesia) (United Kingdom)	Yayuk Basuki; Jo Durie	2; 6	6^{5} 7^{7}
3	(Indonesia) (United Kingdom)	Suzanna Anggarkusuma / Yayuk Basuki; Jo Durie / Anne Hobbs	5; 7	3; 6

==== United States vs. Greece ====
United States
3
Ariake Coliseum, Tokyo, Japan
October 1989
Hard (outdoors)

Greece
0

			1	2	3
1	(United States) (Greece)	Chris Evert; Christína Papadáki	6; 0	6; 1
2	(United States) (Greece)	Martina Navratilova; Angeliki Kanellopoulou	6; 3	6; 1
3	(United States) (Greece)	Zina Garrison-Jackson / Pam Shriver; Angeliki Kanellopoulou / Olga Tsarbopoulou	6; 1	6; 3

==== Poland vs. Denmark ====
Poland
0
Ariake Coliseum, Tokyo, Japan
October 1989
Hard (outdoors)

Denmark
3

			1	2	3
1	(Poland) (Denmark)	Magdalena Feistel; Karin Ptaszek	6^{3} 7^{7}	3; 6
2	(Poland) (Denmark)	Katarzyna Nowak; Tine Scheuer-Larsen	0; 6	2; 6
3	(Poland) (Denmark)	Sylwia Czopek / Magdalena Feistel; Henriette Kjær Nielsen / Tine Scheuer-Larsen	6^{6} 7^{8}	0; 6

==== Australia vs. China ====
Australia
3
Ariake Coliseum, Tokyo, Japan
October 1989
Hard (outdoors)

China
0

			1	2	3
1	(Australia) (China)	Elizabeth Smylie; Tang Min	6; 2	6; 1
2	(Australia) (China)	Anne Minter; Chen Li-Ling	6; 3	6; 2
3	(Australia) (China)	Jenny Byrne / Janine Tremelling; Li Fang / Li Yan-Ling	6; 2	6; 1

==== Italy vs. New Zealand ====
Italy
1
Ariake Coliseum, Tokyo, Japan
October 1989
Hard (outdoors)

New Zealand
2

			1	2	3
1	(Italy) (New Zealand)	Sandra Cecchini; Claudine Toleafoa	4; 6	6; 4	8; 10
2	(Italy) (New Zealand)	Raffaella Reggi; Belinda Cordwell	4; 6	1; 6
3	(Italy) (New Zealand)	Laura Garrone / Laura Golarsa; Julie Richardson / Ruth Seeman	6; 2	7; 5

==== South Korea vs. Bulgaria ====
South Korea
0
Ariake Coliseum, Tokyo, Japan
October 1989
Hard (outdoors)

Bulgaria
3

			1	2	3
1	(South Korea) (Bulgaria)	Im Sook-ja; Katerina Maleeva	2; 6	2; 6
2	(South Korea) (Bulgaria)	Kim Il-soon; Manuela Maleeva	1; 6	0; 6
3	(South Korea) (Bulgaria)	Kim Il-soon / Lee Jeong-myung; Katerina Maleeva / Manuela Maleeva	5; 7	0; 6

==== Philippines vs. Argentina ====
Philippines
0
Ariake Coliseum, Tokyo, Japan
October 1989
Hard (outdoors)

Argentina
2

			1	2	3
1	(Philippines) (Argentina)	Dyan Castillejo; Patricia Tarabini	1; 6	1; 6
2	(Philippines) (Argentina)	Sarah Castillejo; Mercedes Paz	2; 6	3; 6
3	(Philippines) (Argentina)					not played

==== Spain vs. France ====
Spain
2
Ariake Coliseum, Tokyo, Japan
October 1989
Hard (outdoors)

France
0

			1	2	3
1	(Spain) (France)	Conchita Martínez; Isabelle Demongeot	6^{3} 7^{7}	7^{7} 6^{4}	6; 4
2	(Spain) (France)	Arantxa Sánchez Vicario; Nathalie Tauziat	6; 4	6; 2
3	(Spain) (France)					not played

==== Yugoslavia vs. Netherlands ====
Yugoslavia
0
Ariake Coliseum, Tokyo, Japan
October 1989
Hard (outdoors)

Netherlands
2

			1	2	3
1	(Socialist Federal Republic of Yugoslavia) (Netherlands)	Nadin Ercegović; Nicole Krijger-Jagerman	6; 2	4; 6	0; 6
2	(Socialist Federal Republic of Yugoslavia) (Netherlands)	Sabrina Goleš; Brenda Schultz	6^{5} 7^{7}	0; 6
3	(Socialist Federal Republic of Yugoslavia) (Netherlands)					not played

==== Canada vs. Brazil ====
Canada
2
Ariake Coliseum, Tokyo, Japan
October 1989
Hard (outdoors)

Brazil
1

			1	2	3
1	(Canada) (Brazil)	Jill Hetherington; Luciana Tella	4; 6	6; 1	5; 7
2	(Canada) (Brazil)	Helen Kelesi; Gisele Miró	6; 4	6; 1
3	(Canada) (Brazil)	Jill Hetherington / Helen Kelesi; Gisele Miró / Luciana Tella	6; 1	6; 4

==== Switzerland vs. Soviet Union ====
Switzerland
0
Ariake Coliseum, Tokyo, Japan
October 1989
Hard (outdoors)

Soviet Union
2

			1	2	3
1	(Switzerland) (Soviet Union)	Emanuela Zardo; Larisa Savchenko	6^{4} 7^{7}	3; 6
2	(Switzerland) (Soviet Union)	Céline Cohen; Natasha Zvereva	4; 6	3; 6
3	(Switzerland) (Soviet Union)					not played

=== Second round ===
==== Czechoslovakia vs. Hungary ====
Czechoslovakia
2
Ariake Coliseum, Tokyo, Japan
October 1989
Hard (outdoors)

Hungary
1

			1	2	3
1	(Czechoslovakia) (Hungary)	Jana Novotná; Andrea Noszály	6; 3	6; 3
2	(Czechoslovakia) (Hungary)	Helena Suková; Andrea Temesvári	7^{7} 6^{5}	6; 0
3	(Czechoslovakia) (Hungary)	Jana Pospíšilová / Regina Rajchrtová; Andrea Noszály / Réka Szikszay	4; 6	4; 6

==== Japan vs. West Germany ====
Japan
0
Ariake Coliseum, Tokyo, Japan
October 1989
Hard (outdoors)

West Germany
3

			1	2	3
1	(Japan) (West Germany)	Nana Miyagi; Claudia Kohde-Kilsch	3; 7	4; 6
2	(Japan) (West Germany)	Akiko Kijimuta; Steffi Graf	4; 6	1; 6
3	(Japan) (West Germany)	Kimiko Date / Etsuko Inoue; Steffi Graf / Claudia Kohde-Kilsch	4; 6	7; 5	2; 6

==== Austria vs. Great Britain ====
Austria
2
Ariake Coliseum, Tokyo, Japan
October 1989
Hard (outdoors)

Great Britain
1

			1	2	3
1	(Austria) (United Kingdom)	Judith Wiesner; Clare Wood	6; 2	6; 4
2	(Austria) (United Kingdom)	Barbara Paulus; Jo Durie	2; 6	6; 4	6; 3
3	(Austria) (United Kingdom)	Barbara Paulus / Petra Schwarz; Jo Durie / Anne Hobbs	6; 3	6^{3} 7^{7}	3; 6

==== United States vs. Denmark ====
United States
3
Ariake Coliseum, Tokyo, Japan
October 1989
Hard (outdoors)

Denmark
0

			1	2	3
1	(United States) (Denmark)	Chris Evert; Karin Ptaszek	6; 1	6; 1
2	(United States) (Denmark)	Martina Navratilova; Tine Scheuer-Larsen	7; 5	6; 3
3	(United States) (Denmark)	Zina Garrison-Jackson / Martina Navratilova; Henriette Kjær Nielsen / Tine Scheuer-Larsen	6; 3	6; 1

==== Australia vs. New Zealand ====
Australia
3
Ariake Coliseum, Tokyo, Japan
October 1989
Hard (outdoors)

New Zealand
0

			1	2	3
1	(Australia) (New Zealand)	Elizabeth Smylie; Claudine Toleafoa	6; 1	6; 3
2	(Australia) (New Zealand)	Anne Minter; Belinda Cordwell	6; 2	6; 4
3	(Australia) (New Zealand)	Jenny Byrne / Janine Tremelling; Belinda Cordwell / Julie Richardson	6; 3	7; 5

==== Bulgaria vs. Argentina ====
Bulgaria
3
Ariake Coliseum, Tokyo, Japan
October 1989
Hard (outdoors)

Argentina
0

			1	2	3
1	(Bulgaria) (Argentina)	Katerina Maleeva; Patricia Tarabini	6; 1	6; 0
2	(Bulgaria) (Argentina)	Manuela Maleeva; Mercedes Paz	4; 6	6; 1	6; 3
3	(Bulgaria) (Argentina)	Katerina Maleeva / Manuela Maleeva; Florencia Labat / Mercedes Paz	6; 1	3; 6	6; 1

==== Spain vs. Netherlands ====
Spain
2
Ariake Coliseum, Tokyo, Japan
October 1989
Hard (outdoors)

Netherlands
0

			1	2	3
1	(Spain) (Netherlands)	Conchita Martínez; Nicole Krijger-Jagerman	6; 4	7; 5
2	(Spain) (Netherlands)	Arantxa Sánchez Vicario; Brenda Schultz	2; 6	6; 4	10; 8
3	(Spain) (Netherlands)					not played

==== Canada vs. Soviet Union ====
Canada
1
Ariake Coliseum, Tokyo, Japan
October 1989
Hard (outdoors)

Soviet Union
2

			1	2	3
1	(Canada) (Soviet Union)	Rene Simpson; Larisa Savchenko	1; 6	0; 6
2	(Canada) (Soviet Union)	Helen Kelesi; Leila Meskhi	6; 1	7; 5
3	(Canada) (Soviet Union)	Jill Hetherington / Helen Kelesi; Larisa Savchenko / Natasha Zvereva	0; 6	2; 6

=== Quarterfinals ===
==== Czechoslovakia vs. West Germany ====
Czechoslovakia
2
Ariake Coliseum, Tokyo, Japan
October 1989
Hard (outdoors)

West Germany
1

			1	2	3
1	(Czechoslovakia) (West Germany)	Jana Novotná; Claudia Kohde-Kilsch	6; 3	6; 3
2	(Czechoslovakia) (West Germany)	Helena Suková; Steffi Graf	2; 6	1; 6
3	(Czechoslovakia) (West Germany)	Jana Novotná / Helena Suková; Steffi Graf / Claudia Kohde-Kilsch	6; 2	6; 2

==== Austria vs. United States ====
Austria
0
Ariake Coliseum, Tokyo, Japan
October 1989
Hard (outdoors)

United States
3

			1	2	3
1	(Austria) (United States)	Judith Wiesner; Chris Evert	1; 6	0; 6
2	(Austria) (United States)	Barbara Paulus; Martina Navratilova	4; 6	1; 6
3	(Austria) (United States)	Barbara Paulus / Judith Wiesner; Martina Navratilova / Pam Shriver	1; 6	2; 6

==== Australia vs. Bulgaria ====
Australia
2
Ariake Coliseum, Tokyo, Japan
October 1989
Hard (outdoors)

Bulgaria
1

			1	2	3
1	(Australia) (Bulgaria)	Elizabeth Smylie; Katerina Maleeva	2; 6	1; 6
2	(Australia) (Bulgaria)	Anne Minter; Manuela Maleeva	6; 3	2; 6	6; 4
3	(Australia) (Bulgaria)	Elizabeth Smylie / Janine Tremelling; Katerina Maleeva / Manuela Maleeva	5; 7	6; 4	6; 0

==== Spain vs. Soviet Union ====
Spain
2
Ariake Coliseum, Tokyo, Japan
October 1989
Hard (outdoors)

Soviet Union
1

			1	2	3
1	(Spain) (Soviet Union)	Conchita Martínez; Larisa Savchenko	6; 1	6; 1
2	(Spain) (Soviet Union)	Arantxa Sánchez Vicario; Natasha Zvereva	7; 5	6; 3
3	(Spain) (Soviet Union)	Conchita Martínez / Arantxa Sánchez Vicario; Larisa Savchenko / Natasha Zvereva	4; 6	6; 2	1; 6

=== Semifinals ===
==== Czechoslovakia vs. United States ====
Czechoslovakia
0
Ariake Coliseum, Tokyo, Japan
October 1989
Hard (outdoors)

United States
2

			1	2	3
1	(Czechoslovakia) (United States)	Jana Novotná; Chris Evert	2; 6	3; 6
2	(Czechoslovakia) (United States)	Helena Suková; Martina Navratilova	6; 4	1; 6	4; 6
3	(Czechoslovakia) (United States)					not played

==== Australia vs. Spain ====
Australia
0
Ariake Coliseum, Tokyo, Japan
October 1989
Hard (outdoors)

Spain
2

			1	2	3
1	(Australia) (Spain)	Elizabeth Smylie; Conchita Martínez	3; 6	2; 6
2	(Australia) (Spain)	Anne Minter; Arantxa Sánchez Vicario	1; 6	6; 4	2; 6
3	(Australia) (Spain)					not played

=== Final ===
==== United States vs. Spain ====
United States
3
Ariake Coliseum, Tokyo, Japan
9 October 1989
Hard (outdoors)

Spain
0

			1	2	3
1	(United States) (Spain)	Chris Evert; Conchita Martínez	6; 3	6; 2
2	(United States) (Spain)	Martina Navratilova; Arantxa Sánchez Vicario	0; 6	6; 3	6; 4
3	(United States) (Spain)	Zina Garrison-Jackson / Pam Shriver; Conchita Martínez / Arantxa Sánchez Vicario	7; 5	6; 1

1989 Federation Cup Champions
(United States)
United States
Thirteenth title

== Consolation ==
=== Qualifying round ===
Winning team	Score	Losing team
Israel	3–0	Jamaica
Malta	3–0	Malaysia
Luxembourg	2–1	Chinese Taipei
Ireland	3–0	Singapore

Winning teams advance to Consolation Main Draw

==== Israel vs. Jamaica ====
Israel
3
Ariake Coliseum, Tokyo, Japan
October 1989
Hard (outdoors)

Jamaica
0

			1	2	3
1	(Israel) (Jamaica)	Hagit Ohayon; Camille Walter	6; 0	6; 2
2	(Israel) (Jamaica)	Ilana Berger; Joni Van Ryck De Groot	6; 1	6; 1
3	(Israel) (Jamaica)	Rona Mayer / Limor Zaltz; Deanne Bell / Joni Van Ryck De Groot	6; 2	6; 3

==== Malta vs. Malaysia ====
Malta
3
Ariake Coliseum, Tokyo, Japan
October 1989
Hard (outdoors)

Malaysia
0

			1	2	3
1	(Malta) (Malaysia)	Alexia Gera; Kerry Anne Lim	6; 1	6; 2
2	(Malta) (Malaysia)	Carol Cassar-Torreggiani; Kam Shu-shin	6; 1	6; 1
3	(Malta) (Malaysia)	Katherine Camilleri / Carol Cassar-Torreggiani; Kam Shu-shin / Kerry Anne Lim	6; 4	6; 2

==== Luxembourg vs. Chinese Taipei ====
Luxembourg
2
Ariake Coliseum, Tokyo, Japan
October 1989
Hard (outdoors)

Chinese Taipei
1

			1	2	3
1	(Luxembourg) (Chinese Taipei)	Marie-Christine Goy; Lai Su-lin	6; 4	6; 1
2	(Luxembourg) (Chinese Taipei)	Karin Kschwendt; Wang Shi-ting	6; 1	2; 6	6; 2
3	(Luxembourg) (Chinese Taipei)	Marie-Christine Goy / Pascale Welter; Lai Su-lin / Wang Shi-ting	7^{7} 6^{3}	2; 6	3; 6

==== Ireland vs. Singapore ====
Ireland
3
Ariake Coliseum, Tokyo, Japan
October 1989
Hard (outdoors)

Singapore
0

			1	2	3
1	(Republic of Ireland) (Singapore)	Jennifer O'Brien; Valerie Tan	6; 2	6; 1
2	(Republic of Ireland) (Singapore)	Lesley O'Halloran; Nozelina Lukeman	6; 2	6; 2
3	(Republic of Ireland) (Singapore)	Gina Niland / Lesley O'Halloran; Valerie Tan / Caroline Young	6; 1	6; 1

=== Main draw ===
Consolation First Round
Yugoslavia	3
Philippines	0
Brazil	2
Poland	1
Q	Luxembourg	1
China	2
Thailand	0
Finland	3

Consolation Second Round
France	w/o
South Korea
Q	Israel	1
Yugoslavia	2
Switzerland	3
Belgium	0
Indonesia	3
Brazil	0
China
Greece	w/o
Q	Ireland	0
Sweden	3
Finland	3
Q	Malta	0
Mexico	0
Italy	3

Consolation Quarterfinals
South Korea	1
Yugoslavia	2
Switzerland	1
Indonesia	2
China	1
Sweden	2
Finland	2
Italy	1

Consolation Semifinals
Yugoslavia	0
Indonesia	2
Sweden	0
Finland	2

Consolation Final
Indonesia	2
Finland	1

=== First round ===
==== Yugoslavia vs. Philippines ====
Yugoslavia
3
Ariake Coliseum, Tokyo, Japan
October 1989
Hard (outdoors)

Philippines
0

			1	2	3
1	(Socialist Federal Republic of Yugoslavia) (Philippines)	Nadin Ercegović; Dyan Castillejo	6; 1	6; 1
2	(Socialist Federal Republic of Yugoslavia) (Philippines)	Sabrina Goleš; Sarah Castillejo	6; 1	6; 3
3	(Socialist Federal Republic of Yugoslavia) (Philippines)	Sabrina Goleš / Mima Jaušovec; Dyan Castillejo / Dorothy Jane Suarez	6; 2	6; 1

==== Brazil vs. Poland ====
Brazil
2
Ariake Coliseum, Tokyo, Japan
October 1989
Hard (outdoors)

Poland
1

			1	2	3
1	(Brazil) (Poland)	Luciana Tella; Magdalena Feistel	7; 5	6; 0
2	(Brazil) (Poland)	Gisele Miró; Katarzyna Nowak	6; 2	6; 2
3	(Brazil) (Poland)	Gisele Miró / Luciana Tella; Magdalena Feistel / Katarzyna Nowak	5; 7	4; 6

==== Luxembourg vs. China ====
Luxembourg
1
Ariake Coliseum, Tokyo, Japan
October 1989
Hard (outdoors)

China
2

			1	2	3
1	(Luxembourg) (China)	Marie-Christine Goy; Tang Min	2; 6	3; 6
2	(Luxembourg) (China)	Karin Kschwendt; Chen Li-Ling	6; 3	6; 1
3	(Luxembourg) (China)	Marie-Christine Goy / Karin Kschwendt; Li Fang / Tang Min	7^{9} 6^{7}	4; 6	2; 6

==== Thailand vs. Finland ====
Thailand
0
Ariake Coliseum, Tokyo, Japan
October 1989
Hard (outdoors)

Finland
3

			1	2	3
1	(Thailand) (Finland)	Orawan Thampensri; Anne Aallonen	4; 6	4; 6
2	(Thailand) (Finland)	Tossaporn Summa; Petra Thorén	0; 6	6; 3	3; 6
3	(Thailand) (Finland)	Tossaporn Summa / Orathai Thampensri; Anne Aallonen / Nanne Dahlman	3; 6	4; 6

=== Second round ===
==== Israel vs. Yugoslavia ====
Israel
1
Ariake Coliseum, Tokyo, Japan
October 1989
Hard (outdoors)

Yugoslavia
2

			1	2	3
1	(Israel) (Socialist Federal Republic of Yugoslavia)	Hagit Ohayon; Nadin Ercegović	6; 2	6; 3
2	(Israel) (Socialist Federal Republic of Yugoslavia)	Ilana Berger; Sabrina Goleš	6; 1	4; 6	4; 6
3	(Israel) (Socialist Federal Republic of Yugoslavia)	Ilana Berger / Hagit Ohayon; Sabrina Goleš / Mima Jaušovec	4; 6	4; 6

==== Switzerland vs. Belgium ====
Switzerland
3
Ariake Coliseum, Tokyo, Japan
October 1989
Hard (outdoors)

Belgium
0

			1	2	3
1	(Switzerland) (Belgium)	Céline Cohen; Caroline van Renterghem	6; 2	7^{7} 6^{1}
2	(Switzerland) (Belgium)	Eva Krapl; Sabine Appelmans	7; 5	6; 2
3	(Switzerland) (Belgium)	Céline Cohen / Gabrielle Villiger; Sabine Appelmans / Caroline van Renterghem	6; 1	6; 1

==== Indonesia vs. Brazil ====
Indonesia
3
Ariake Coliseum, Tokyo, Japan
October 1989
Hard (outdoors)

Brazil
0

			1	2	3
1	(Indonesia) (Brazil)	Suzanna Anggarkusuma; Luciana Tella	6^{4} 7^{7}	6; 3	6; 4
2	(Indonesia) (Brazil)	Yayuk Basuki; Gisele Miró	6; 3	4; 6	9; 7
3	(Indonesia) (Brazil)	Lukky Tedjamukti / Waya Walalangi; Patricia Medrado / Gisele Miró	7; 5	6; 3

==== Ireland vs. Sweden ====
Ireland
0
Ariake Coliseum, Tokyo, Japan
October 1989
Hard (outdoors)

Sweden
3

			1	2	3
1	(Republic of Ireland) (Sweden)	Jennifer O'Brien; Cecilia Dahlman	1; 6	2; 6
2	(Republic of Ireland) (Sweden)	Lesley O'Halloran; Maria Strandlund	2; 6	3; 6
3	(Republic of Ireland) (Sweden)	Gina Niland / Lesley O'Halloran; Jonna Jonerup / Maria Strandlund	1; 6	2; 6

==== Finland vs. Malta ====
Finland
3
Ariake Coliseum, Tokyo, Japan
October 1989
Hard (outdoors)

Malta
0

			1	2	3
1	(Finland) (Malta)	Nanne Dahlman; Alexia Gera	6; 0	6; 1
2	(Finland) (Malta)	Petra Thorén; Carol Cassar-Torreggiani	6; 2	6; 0
3	(Finland) (Malta)	Anne Aallonen / Nanne Dahlman; Katherine Camilleri / Alexia Gera	6; 0	6; 0

==== Mexico vs. Italy ====
Mexico
0
Ariake Coliseum, Tokyo, Japan
October 1989
Hard (outdoors)

Italy
3

			1	2	3
1	(Mexico) (Italy)	Aránzazu Gallardo; Laura Garrone	1; 6	0; 6
2	(Mexico) (Italy)	Xóchitl Escobedo; Laura Golarsa	5; 7	3; 6
3	(Mexico) (Italy)	Xóchitl Escobedo / Aránzazu Gallardo; Laura Garrone / Laura Golarsa	5; 7	4; 6

=== Quarterfinals ===
==== South Korea vs. Yugoslavia ====
South Korea
1
Ariake Coliseum, Tokyo, Japan
October 1989
Hard (outdoors)

Yugoslavia
2

			1	2	3
1	(South Korea) (Socialist Federal Republic of Yugoslavia)	Im Sook-ja; Nadin Ercegović	6; 1	6; 3
2	(South Korea) (Socialist Federal Republic of Yugoslavia)	Kim Il-soon; Sabrina Goleš	2; 6	3; 6
3	(South Korea) (Socialist Federal Republic of Yugoslavia)	Im Sook-ja / Kim Il-soon; Sabrina Goleš / Mima Jaušovec	3; 6	6^{7} 7^{9}

==== Switzerland vs. Indonesia ====
Switzerland
1
Ariake Coliseum, Tokyo, Japan
October 1989
Hard (outdoors)

Indonesia
2

			1	2	3
1	(Switzerland) (Indonesia)	Gabrielle Villiger; Suzanna Anggarkusuma	1; 6	2; 6
2	(Switzerland) (Indonesia)	Céline Cohen; Yayuk Basuki	6; 3	6; 3
3	(Switzerland) (Indonesia)	Céline Cohen / Emanuela Zardo; Suzanna Anggarkusuma / Yayuk Basuki	2; 6	1; 6

==== China vs. Sweden ====
China
1
Ariake Coliseum, Tokyo, Japan
October 1989
Hard (outdoors)

Sweden
2

			1	2	3
1	(China) (Sweden)	Tang Min; Jonna Jonerup	7^{7} 6^{3}	6; 2
2	(China) (Sweden)	Chen Li-Ling; Maria Strandlund	2; 6	6; 3	2; 6
3	(China) (Sweden)	Li Fang / Tang Min; Cecilia Dahlman / Maria Strandlund	2; 6	6; 3	4; 6

==== Finland vs. Italy ====
Finland
2
Ariake Coliseum, Tokyo, Japan
October 1989
Hard (outdoors)

Italy
1

			1	2	3
1	(Finland) (Italy)	Nanne Dahlman; Laura Garrone	6; 4	5; 7	0; 6
2	(Finland) (Italy)	Anne Aallonen; Sandra Cecchini	7^{7} 6^{5}	6; 2
3	(Finland) (Italy)	Anne Aallonen / Nanne Dahlman; Sandra Cecchini / Laura Garrone	6; 4	4; 6	6; 2

=== Semifinals ===
==== Yugoslavia vs. Indonesia ====
Yugoslavia
0
Ariake Coliseum, Tokyo, Japan
October 1989
Hard (outdoors)

Indonesia
2

			1	2	3
1	(Socialist Federal Republic of Yugoslavia) (Indonesia)	Nadin Ercegović; Suzanna Anggarkusuma	1; 6	6; 4	2; 6
2	(Socialist Federal Republic of Yugoslavia) (Indonesia)	Sabrina Goleš; Yayuk Basuki				w/o
3	(Socialist Federal Republic of Yugoslavia) (Indonesia)

==== Sweden vs. Finland ====
Sweden
0
Ariake Coliseum, Tokyo, Japan
October 1989
Hard (outdoors)

Finland
2

			1	2	3
1	(Sweden) (Finland)	Cecilia Dahlman; Nanne Dahlman	4; 6	2; 6
2	(Sweden) (Finland)	Maria Strandlund; Anne Aallonen	5; 7	2; 6
3	(Sweden) (Finland)					not played

=== Final ===
==== Indonesia vs. Finland ====
Indonesia
2
Ariake Coliseum, Tokyo, Japan
October 1989
Hard (outdoors)

Finland
1

			1	2	3
1	(Indonesia) (Finland)	Suzanna Anggarkusuma; Nanne Dahlman	4; 6	6; 3	4; 6
2	(Indonesia) (Finland)	Yayuk Basuki; Anne Aallonen	6; 1	6; 4
3	(Indonesia) (Finland)	Suzanna Anggarkusuma / Yayuk Basuki; Anne Aallonen / Nanne Dahlman	6; 2	6^{5} 7^{7}	7; 5
