= 1993 French Open – Women's singles qualifying =

Women's singles qualifying
- 1993 French Open

Events
Singles	men	women		boys	girls
Doubles	men	women	mixed	boys	girls
WC Singles	men	women	quad
WC Doubles	men	women	quad
Legends	−45	45+	women

Qualification
Singles	men	women
- French Open

Players who neither had high enough rankings nor received wild cards to enter the main draw of the annual French Open Tennis Championships participated in a qualifying tournament held in the week before the event.

== Seeds ==
1. (Czech Republic) Radka Bobková (qualifying competition)
2. (Ukraine) Elena Brioukhovets (second round)
3. (Paraguay) Rossana de los Ríos (qualifying competition)
4. -
5. (Greece) Christína Papadáki (qualified)
6. (Spain) Virginia Ruano Pascual (second round)
7. (Germany) Heike Rusch (first round)
8. (Japan) Ai Sugiyama (first round)
9. (United States) Katrina Adams (first round)
10. (Brazil) Andrea Vieira (first round)
11. (Netherlands) Claire Wegink (second round)
12. (Finland) Petra Thorén (qualifying competition)
13. (Argentina) Mercedes Paz (qualified)
14. (Australia) Kristin Godridge (second round)
15. (Austria) Sandra Dopfer (qualified)
16. (Slovakia) Karina Habšudová (first round)

== Qualifiers ==
1. (United States) Donna Faber
2. (Italy) Marzia Grossi
3. (Austria) Petra Schwarz
4. (Austria) Sandra Dopfer
5. (Argentina) María José Gaidano
6. (Italy) Laura Garrone
7. (Greece) Christína Papadáki
8. (Argentina) Mercedes Paz

== Lucky losers ==
1. (Czechoslovakia) Denisa Krajčovičová
2. (Czechoslovakia) Petra Langrová

== Qualifying draw ==
Key

- Q = Qualifier
- WC = Wild card
- LL = Lucky loser
- Alt = Alternate
- ITF = ITF entry
- PR = Protected ranking
- SR = Special ranking
- SE = Special exempt
- JE = Junior exempt
- JR = Junior Accelerator Programme entrant
- CO = College Accelerator Programme entrant
- NG = Next Gen Accelerator Program entrant
- w/o = Walkover
- r = Retired
- d = Defaulted

=== First qualifier ===
First round
1	(Czech Republic) Radka Bobková	6	6
WC	(France) Laurence Andretto	1	1
WC	(France) Catherine Suire	4	6	6
(Spain) Cristina Torrens Valero	6	0	4
(Australia) Louise Field	3	4
(United States) Donna Faber	6	6
(Bulgaria) Elena Pampoulova	4	6	2
14	(Australia) Kristin Godridge	6	4	6

Second round
1	(Czech Republic) Radka Bobková	6	6
WC	(France) Catherine Suire	2	3
(United States) Donna Faber	6	6
14	(Australia) Kristin Godridge	3	3

Qualifying competition
1	(Czech Republic) Radka Bobková	6	5	4
(United States) Donna Faber	1	7	6

=== Second qualifier ===
First round
12	(Finland) Petra Thorén	6^{3}	6	6
(Sweden) Maria Strandlund	7^{7}	3	4
(United States) Meredith McGrath	4	1
(Israel) Yael Segal	6	6
(Italy) Marzia Grossi	6	6
(United States) Erika deLone	3	0
(United States) Elise Burgin	5	0
6	(Spain) Virginia Ruano Pascual	7	6

Second round
12	(Finland) Petra Thorén	6	6
(Israel) Yael Segal	3	2
(Italy) Marzia Grossi	6	6
6	(Spain) Virginia Ruano Pascual	0	2

Qualifying competition
12	(Finland) Petra Thorén	3	6^{6}
(Italy) Marzia Grossi	6	7^{8}

=== Third qualifier ===
First round
3	(Paraguay) Rossana de los Ríos	3	6	8
(Japan) Maya Kidowaki	6	3	6
(Germany) Katja Oeljeklaus	3	3
(Austria) Beate Reinstadler	6	6
(Paraguay) Larissa Schaerer	5	0
(Bulgaria) Lubomira Bacheva	7	6
(Austria) Petra Schwarz	3	6	7
9	(United States) Katrina Adams	6	4	5

Second round
3	(Paraguay) Rossana de los Ríos	6	1	6
(Austria) Beate Reinstadler	2	6	3
(Bulgaria) Lubomira Bacheva	6	1	4
(Austria) Petra Schwarz	2	6	6

Qualifying competition
3	(Paraguay) Rossana de los Ríos	4	3
(Austria) Petra Schwarz	6	6

=== Fourth qualifier ===
First round
15	(Austria) Sandra Dopfer	6	6
WC	(France) Catherine Tanvier	2	1
(Sweden) Åsa Carlsson	6	5	6
(South Africa) Dianne Van Rensburg	1	7	8
(Italy) Elena Savoldi	2	6^{4}
(Belgium) Laurence Courtois	6	7^{7}
(Germany) Marketa Kochta	6	6
7	(Germany) Heike Rusch	2	2

Second round
15	(Austria) Sandra Dopfer	6	7
(South Africa) Dianne Van Rensburg	1	5
(Belgium) Laurence Courtois	6	2	7
(Germany) Marketa Kochta	2	6	5

Qualifying competition
15	(Austria) Sandra Dopfer	6	6
(Belgium) Laurence Courtois	1	4

=== Fifth qualifier ===
First round
8	(Japan) Ai Sugiyama	0	7	2
(Slovakia) Denisa Krajčovičová	6	5	6
(Germany) Andrea Müller	2	6^{5}
(Netherlands) Esmir Hoogendoorn	6	7^{7}
WC	(France) Caroline Toyre	1	3
(Argentina) María José Gaidano	6	6
(United States) Ann Henricksson	1	2
11	(Netherlands) Claire Wegink	6	6

Second round
(Slovakia) Denisa Krajčovičová	2	6	6
(Netherlands) Esmir Hoogendoorn	6	2	3
(Argentina) María José Gaidano	6	6
11	(Netherlands) Claire Wegink	3	3

Qualifying competition
(Slovakia) Denisa Krajčovičová	4	5
(Argentina) María José Gaidano	6	7

=== Sixth qualifier ===
First round
16	(Slovakia) Karina Habšudová	5	6^{1}
(Italy) Laura Garrone	7	7^{7}
(Russia) Elena Makarova	4	1
(United States) Jessica Emmons	6	6
(Belgium) Ann Devries	6	6
WC	(France) Audrey Sidot	2	2
(United States) Shannan McCarthy	2	7^{7}	6
Alt	(United States) Julie Steven	6	6^{3}	4

Second round
(Italy) Laura Garrone	6	6
(United States) Jessica Emmons	2	2
(Belgium) Ann Devries	6	6
(United States) Shannan McCarthy	3	4

Qualifying competition
(Italy) Laura Garrone	6	6
(Belgium) Ann Devries	0	3

=== Seventh qualifier ===
First round
5	(Greece) Christína Papadáki	6	6
(Japan) Hiromi Nagano	2	3
(South Korea) Park Sung-hee	2	6	6
WC	(France) Caroline Dhenin	6	4	2
(Australia) Tracey Morton-Rodgers	6^{5}	5
(Spain) Estefanía Bottini	7^{7}	7
WC	(France) Amélie Oudéa-Castéra	6	3	6
10	(Brazil) Andrea Vieira	2	6	3

Second round
5	(Greece) Christína Papadáki	1	7^{7}	9
(South Korea) Park Sung-hee	6	6^{4}	7
(Spain) Estefanía Bottini	1	4
WC	(France) Amélie Oudéa-Castéra	6	6

Qualifying competition
5	(Greece) Christína Papadáki	6	1	6
WC	(France) Amélie Oudéa-Castéra	2	6	3

=== Eighth qualifier ===
First round
13	(Argentina) Mercedes Paz	6	6
(France) Sybille Niox-Château	1	2
WC	(France) Nathalie Housset Gilbert	6^{5}	3
(Japan) Akiko Kijimuta	7^{7}	6
(United States) Audra Keller	6	6
(Australia) Nicole Pratt	4	1
(United States) Jolene Watanabe	2	3
2	(Ukraine) Elena Brioukhovets	6	6

Second round
13	(Argentina) Mercedes Paz	6	6
(Japan) Akiko Kijimuta	1	2
(United States) Audra Keller	4	6	6
2	(Ukraine) Elena Brioukhovets	6	2	3

Qualifying competition
13	(Argentina) Mercedes Paz	6	6
(United States) Audra Keller	1	3
