= 1994 Nokia Open – Singles =

Singles
- 1994 Salem Open-Beijing and the Nokia Open

Final
- Champion: (Indonesia) Yayuk Basuki
- Runner-up: (Japan) Kyōko Nagatsuka
- Score: 6–4, 6–2

Events
Singles	men	women
Doubles	men	women
← 1993 ·	Salem Open-Beijing	· 1995 →
← 1993 ·	Nokia Open	· 1995 →

Second-seeded Yayuk Basuki won in the final 6–4, 6–2 against Kyōko Nagatsuka.

== Seeds ==
A champion seed is indicated in bold text while text in italics indicates the round in which that seed was eliminated.

1. (Chinese Taipei) ~~Wang Shi-ting~~ (withdrew)
2. (Indonesia) **Yayuk Basuki (champion)**
3. (United States) Pam Shriver (semifinals)
4. (France) Alexandra Fusai (first round)
5. (Indonesia) Romana Tedjakusuma (second round)
6. (China) Fang Li (quarterfinals)
7. (Japan) Misumi Miyauchi (quarterfinals)
8. (Japan) Kyōko Nagatsuka (final)

== Draw ==
=== Key ===
- Q = Qualifier
- WC = Wild card
- LL = Lucky loser
- Alt = Alternate
- SE = Special exempt
- PR = Protected ranking
- ITF = ITF entry
- JE = Junior exempt
- w/o = Walkover
- r = Retired
- d = Defaulted
- SR = Special ranking

First round
LL	(United States) J Shiflet	0	0
(France) **A D-Balleret**	**6**	**6**
WC	(China) Y Bi	4	1
(Japan) **E Iida**	**6**	**6**
WC	(China) J-Q Yi	5	1
Q	(China) **L-Y Tang**	**7**	**6**
(Poland) K Nowak	1	2
8	(Japan) **K Nagatsuka**	**6**	**6**
4	(France) A Fusai	2	6^{5}
(Germany) **S Meier**	**6**	**7^{7}**
(Australia) K-A Guse	1	1
(Slovenia) **B Mulej**	**6**	**6**
Q	(United States) S Collins	**7^{10}**	6^{7}	2
(Czech Republic) **A Strnadová**	6^{8}	**7^{9}**	**6**
(Japan) M Kidowaki	**7**	3	r
5	(Indonesia) **R Tedjakusuma**	5	**2**
6	(China) **F Li**	**6**	**6**
(Australia) L Field	2	2
(South Korea) **S-H Park**	**6**	1	**7**
Q	(Japan) H Hara	1	**6**	5
(China) **L-L Chen**	**6**	**6**
(Australia) N Pratt	1	1
(Finland) P Thorén	2	3
3	(United States) **P Shriver**	**6**	**6**
7	(Japan) **M Miyauchi**	**6**	1	**6**
(United States) A Henricksson	3	**6**	3
(Australia) **J Byrne**	3	**6**	**6**
(Germany) A Kerek	**6**	4	2
Q	(Japan) M Yokobori	6^{7}	**6**	4
(Germany) **M Zivec-Skulj**	**7^{9}**	2	**6**
(South Africa) M de Swardt	1	5
2	(Indonesia) **Y Basuki**	**6**	**7**

Second round
(France) **A D-Balleret**	**6**	1	**6**
(Japan) E Iida	4	**6**	3
Q	(China) L-Y Tang	3	1
8	(Japan) **K Nagatsuka**	**6**	**6**
(Germany) **S Meier**	**6**	**6**
(Slovenia) B Mulej	2	2
(Czech Republic) **A Strnadová**	**6**	**6**
5	(Indonesia) R Tedjakusuma	3	0
6	(China) **F Li**	**6**	**6**
(South Korea) S-H Park	3	4
(China) L-L Chen	4	0
3	(United States) **P Shriver**	**6**	**6**
7	(Japan) **M Miyauchi**	**6**	**6**
(Australia) J Byrne	2	2
(Germany) M Zivec-Skulj	4	1
2	(Indonesia) **Y Basuki**	**6**	**6**

Quarterfinals
(France) A D-Balleret	1	3
8	(Japan) **K Nagatsuka**	**6**	**6**
(Germany) S Meier	4	2
(Czech Republic) **A Strnadová**	**6**	**6**
6	(China) F Li	**6**	5	1
3	(United States) **P Shriver**	4	**7**	**6**
7	(Japan) M Miyauchi	0	**6**	6^{4}
2	(Indonesia) **Y Basuki**	**6**	0	**7^{7}**

Semifinals
8	(Japan) **K Nagatsuka**	**6**	**7**
(Czech Republic) A Strnadová	4	5
3	(United States) P Shriver	5	2
2	(Indonesia) **Y Basuki**	**7**	**6**

Final
8	(Japan) Kyōko Nagatsuka	4	2
2	(Indonesia) **Yayuk Basuki**	**6**	**6**
