= List of Israel Fed Cup team representatives =

This is a list of tennis players who have represented the Israel Fed Cup team in an official Fed Cup match. Israel have taken part in the competition since 1972.

== Players ==
Player	W-L (Total)	W-L (Singles)	W-L (Doubles)	Ties	Debut
Chen Astrogo	0-1	-	0-1	1	2010
Cheli Bargil	0-1	-	0-1	2	2001
Ilana Berger	19-21	10-10	9-11	25	1986
Orly Bialistozky	9-13	5-6	4-7	13	1980
Rafeket Binyamini	10-10	6-5	4-5	11	1981
Shahar Biran	0-1	-	0-1	1	2019
Shiri Burstein	1-5	0-1	1-4	5	1994
Nataly Cahana	8-2	2-0	6-2	8	1996
Mara Cohen-Mintz	0-3	0-2	0-1	2	1972
Sagit Doron	2-4	0-1	2-3	5	1983
Vlada Ekshibarova	0-3	0-3	-	3	2018
Tova Epstein	0-4	0-2	0-2	2	1972
Julia Glushko	29-29	17-16	12-13	34	2007
Lina Glushko	6-4	2-1	4-3	8	2018
Gillian Kay	0-1	-	0-1	1	1972
Deniz Khazaniuk	2-2	2-2	-	4	2017
Dalia Koriat	5-4	3-2	2-2	5	1986
Shelly Krolitzky	0-4	-	0-4	4	2016
Ofri Lankri	1-1	1-0	0-1	1	2014
Tamar Levin	1-1	-	1-1	2	1977
Rona Mayer	1-1	-	1-1	2	1989
Nicole Nadel	0-1	0-1	-	1	2018
Tzipora Obziler	51-39	23-16	28-23	61	1994
Hagit Ohayon	3-4	2-1	1-3	6	1988
Valeria Patiuk	0-2	-	0-2	2	2011
Shahar Pe'er	45-31	28-15	17-16	43	2002
Paulina Peled	6-19	6-8	0-11	14	1974
Alona Pushkarevsky	0-4	0-1	0-3	4	2015
Hila Rosen	24-18	15-8	9-10	33	1994
Yevgenia Savranska	0-1	-	0-1	1	2003
Yael Segal	11-15	9-10	2-5	19	1988
Yael Shavit	1-1	0-1	1-0	2	1987
Keren Shlomo	0-11	0-4	0-7	9	2010
Darya Shvartsmann	0-1	0-1	-	1	2019
Anna Smashnova	43-30	38-24	5-6	61	1992
Janine Strauss	1-7	1-3	0-4	4	1974
Maya Tahan	2-5	0-5	2-0	5	2017
Limor Zaltz	4-7	-	4-7	11	1989
Hagit Zubary	3-14	2-8	1-6	10	1976
