= 1993 Australian Open – Women's singles qualifying =

Women's singles qualifying
- 1993 Australian Open

Events
Singles	men	women		boys	girls
Doubles	men	women	mixed	boys	girls
WC Singles	men	women	quad
WC Doubles	men	women	quad
Legends	men	women	mixed

Qualification
Singles	men	women
- Australian Open

The qualifying rounds for the 1993 Australian Open were played in early January 1993 at the National Tennis Centre at Flinders Park in Melbourne, Australia.

== Seeds ==
1. (Mexico) Angélica Gavaldón (qualified)
2. (United States) Lindsay Davenport (qualified)
3. (Japan) Maya Kidowaki (qualifying competition, lucky loser)
4. (United States) Katrina Adams (second round)
5. (Netherlands) ~~Monique Kiene~~ (moved to Main Draw)
6. (Belgium) Ann Devries (first round, retired)
7. (Slovakia) Katarína Studeníková (second round)
8. (Netherlands) Claire Wegink (first round)
9. (Germany) Marketa Kochta (qualifying competition)
10. (Slovenia) Tina Križan (first round)
11. (New Zealand) Julie Richardson (first round)
12. (United Kingdom) Clare Wood (qualified)
13. (United States) Erika deLone (second round)
14. (Canada) Maureen Drake (second round)
15. (Italy) Marzia Grossi (second round)
16. (Japan) Misumi Miyauchi (second round)

== Qualifiers ==
1. (Mexico) Angélica Gavaldón
2. (Sweden) Maria Strandlund
3. (United States) Camille Benjamin
4. (United States) Jessica Emmons
5. (France) Nathalie Herreman
6. (United Kingdom) Clare Wood
7. (United States) Patti O'Reilly
8. (United States) Lindsay Davenport

== Lucky losers ==
1. (Japan) Maya Kidowaki

== Draw ==
=== First qualifier ===
First round
1	(Mexico) Angélica Gavaldón	6	6
(Australia) Kirrily Sharpe	3	0
(Japan) Miki Yokobori	6	6
WC	(Australia) Annabel Ellwood	2	2
(United States) Sandra Cacic	6	6
(Germany) Angela Kerek	4	2
(France) Nathalie Housset Gilbert	1	3
9	(Germany) Marketa Kochta	6	6

Second round
1	(Mexico) Angélica Gavaldón	7	6
(Japan) Miki Yokobori	5	4
(United States) Sandra Cacic	0	5
9	(Germany) Marketa Kochta	6	7

Qualifying competition
1	(Mexico) Angélica Gavaldón	6	7
9	(Germany) Marketa Kochta	2	5

=== Second qualifier ===
First round
13	(United States) Erika deLone	6	6
(United States) Tammy Whittington	3	2
(United Kingdom) Amanda Grunfeld	6	6
(United States) Cammy MacGregor	2	0
(Sweden) Maria Strandlund	7^{7}	6
(Australia) Tracey Morton	6^{1}	1
(Australia) Jo-Anne Faull	3
6	(Belgium) Ann Devries	5^{r}

Second round
13	(United States) Erika deLone	6	1	2
(United Kingdom) Amanda Grunfeld	4	6	6
(Sweden) Maria Strandlund	7	3	7
(Australia) Jo-Anne Faull	5	6	5

Qualifying competition
(United Kingdom) Amanda Grunfeld	6	2	1
(Sweden) Maria Strandlund	4	6	6

=== Third qualifier ===
First round
3	(Japan) Maya Kidowaki	6	6
WC	(Australia) Clare Thompson	2	1
WC	(Australia) Robyn Mawdsley	4	2
(Germany) Andrea Müller	6	6
(Canada) Jill Hetherington	6	6
(United Kingdom) Shirli-Ann Siddall	2	0
(United States) Camille Benjamin	7^{7}	6^{6}	8
11	(New Zealand) Julie Richardson	6^{5}	7^{8}	6

Second round
3	(Japan) Maya Kidowaki	6	6
(Germany) Andrea Müller	4	1
(Canada) Jill Hetherington	4	7^{7}	3
(United States) Camille Benjamin	6	6^{4}	6

Qualifying competition
3	(Japan) Maya Kidowaki	6	4	2
(United States) Camille Benjamin	2	6	6

=== Fourth qualifier ===
First round
15	(Italy) Marzia Grossi	7	6
WC	(Australia) Esther Knox	5	1
(Japan) Ai Sugiyama	7^{7}	6
WC	(Australia) Maija Avotins	6^{0}	1
(Germany) Sabine Lohmann	2	7	6
(Switzerland) Natalie Tschan	6	5	3
(United States) Jessica Emmons	6	7
8	(Netherlands) Claire Wegink	4	5

Second round
15	(Italy) Marzia Grossi	6	6^{6}	2
(Japan) Ai Sugiyama	3	7^{8}	6
(Germany) Sabine Lohmann	4	5
(United States) Jessica Emmons	6	7

Qualifying competition
(Japan) Ai Sugiyama	4	2
(United States) Jessica Emmons	6	6

=== Fifth qualifier ===
First round
Alt	(Netherlands) Kristie Boogert	6	6^{5}	6
(Japan) Tamaka Takagi	3	7^{7}	2
(Germany) Heike Rusch	2	1
(Russia) Elena Makarova	6	6
(France) Nathalie Herreman	6	7^{7}
(Mexico) Lupita Novelo	2	6^{1}
(United States) Rachel Jensen	1	7^{7}	2
14	(Canada) Maureen Drake	6	6^{4}	6

Second round
Alt	(Netherlands) Kristie Boogert	6	2	6
(Russia) Elena Makarova	3	6	8
(France) Nathalie Herreman	6	6
14	(Canada) Maureen Drake	4	4

Qualifying competition
(Russia) Elena Makarova	4	6	5
(France) Nathalie Herreman	6	3	7

=== Sixth qualifier ===
First round
12	(United Kingdom) Clare Wood	7	4	6
(United States) Shannan McCarthy	5	6	2
(Sweden) Åsa Carlsson	6	7
WC	(Australia) Kate McDonald	2	5
(China) Chen Li-Ling	7	7^{7}
(South Korea) Park Sung-hee	5	6^{5}
(Australia) Danielle Jones	1	1
4	(United States) Katrina Adams	6	6

Second round
12	(United Kingdom) Clare Wood	6	3	6
(Sweden) Åsa Carlsson	4	6	1
(China) Chen Li-Ling	6	2	8
4	(United States) Katrina Adams	3	6	6

Qualifying competition
12	(United Kingdom) Clare Wood	3	6	7
(China) Chen Li-Ling	6	4	5

=== Seventh qualifier ===
First round
7	(Slovakia) Katarína Studeníková	3	7	6
(United States) Teri Whitlinger	6	5	1
(Australia) Kristine Radford	2	5
(United States) Aurora Gima	6	7
WC	(Australia) Louise Stacey	6	3	3
(United States) Patti O'Reilly	3	6	6
(France) Sylvie Sabas	6	6
10	(Slovenia) Tina Križan	4	2

Second round
7	(Slovakia) Katarína Studeníková	0	3
(United States) Aurora Gima	6	6
(United States) Patti O'Reilly	6	6
(France) Sylvie Sabas	3	0

Qualifying competition
(United States) Aurora Gima	2	1
(United States) Patti O'Reilly	6	6

=== Eighth qualifier ===
First round
16	(Japan) Misumi Miyauchi	7	4	6
WC	(Australia) Angie Woolcock	5	6	3
(France) Sybille Niox-Château	6	0	3
(New Zealand) Claudine Toleafoa	3	6	6
(Japan) Hiromi Nagano	3	6	3
(United States) Audra Keller	6	4	6
(Israel) Anna Smashnova	2	6^{3}
2	(United States) Lindsay Davenport	6	7^{7}

Second round
16	(Japan) Misumi Miyauchi	2	6^{5}
(New Zealand) Claudine Toleafoa	6	7^{7}
(United States) Audra Keller	1	0
2	(United States) Lindsay Davenport	6	6

Qualifying competition
(New Zealand) Claudine Toleafoa	1	4
2	(United States) Lindsay Davenport	6	6
