= Šmejkal =

Šmejkal or Smejkal (feminine: Šmejkalová, Smejkalová) is a Czech surname. Derived from the verb smýkat ("to drag"), it originally meant a person with a limp. The name may refer to:

- Daniel Šmejkal (born 1970), Czech footballer
- Jan Smejkal (born 1946), Czech chess player
- Jiří Smejkal (born 1996), Czech ice hockey player
- Michal Smejkal (born 1986), Czech footballer
- Rudolf Šmejkal (1915–1972), Czech footballer
- Tomáš Smejkal (born 1998), Czech footballer
- Zdeněk Šmejkal (born 1988), Czech footballer

== See also ==
- Smekal
