= 1994 Nokia Open – Doubles =

Doubles
- 1994 Salem Open-Beijing and the Nokia Open

Final
- Champion: (China) Chen Li-Ling (China) Li Fang
- Runner-up: (Australia) Kerry-Anne Guse (United Kingdom) Valda Lake
- Score: 6–0, 6–2

Details
- Seeds: 4

Events
Singles	men	women
Doubles	men	women
← 1993 ·	Salem Open-Beijing	· 1995 →
← 1993 ·	Nokia Open	· 1995 →

Chen Li-Ling and Li Fang won in the final 6–0, 6–2 against Kerry-Anne Guse and Valda Lake.

== Seeds ==
Champion seeds are indicated in bold text while text in italics indicates the round in which those seeds were eliminated.

1. (Indonesia) Yayuk Basuki / (Czech Republic) Andrea Strnadová (first round)
2. (Japan) Ei Iida / (Japan) Maya Kidowaki (first round)
3. (United States) Sandy Collins / (South Africa) Mariaan de Swardt (semifinals)
4. (Australia) Kerry-Anne Guse / (United Kingdom) Valda Lake (final)

== Draw ==
=== Key ===
- Q = Qualifier
- WC = Wild card
- LL = Lucky loser
- Alt = Alternate
- SE = Special exempt
- PR = Protected ranking
- ITF = ITF entry
- JE = Junior exempt
- w/o = Walkover
- r = Retired
- d = Defaulted
- SR = Special ranking

First round
1	(Indonesia) Y Basuki (Czech Republic) A Strnadová	**6**	5	6^{4}
Q	(China) **Y Bi** (China) **L Li**	3	**7**	**7^{7}**
(Australia) L Field (United States) A Henricksson	3	2
(Germany) **A Kerek** (Germany) **M Zivec-Skulj**	**6**	**6**
4	(Australia) **K-A Guse** (United Kingdom) **V Lake**	**6**	**7^{7}**
(Indonesia) R Tedjakusuma (Finland) P Thorén	1	6^{4}
(South Korea) S-H Park (Indonesia) N Soetrisno	0	**6**	2
(France) **A Dechaume-Balleret** (France) **A Fusai**	**6**	1	**6**
(Netherlands) **C Bakkum** (United States) **A Leand**	**7^{7}**	**6**
Q	(China) L-H Yang (China) J-Q Yi	6^{4}	2
(Australia) D Jones (Japan) K Nagatsuka	1	5
3	(United States) **S Collins** (South Africa) **M de Swardt**	**6**	**7**
(Germany) S Meier (Japan) M Yokobori	3	0
(China) **L-L Chen** (China) **F Li**	**6**	**6**
(Australia) **J Byrne** (Australia) **N Pratt**	**6**	**6**
2	(Japan) E Iida (Japan) M Kidowaki	2	2

Quarterfinals
Q	(China) Y Bi (China) L Li	4	1
(Germany) **A Kerek** (Germany) **M Zivec-Skulj**	**6**	**6**
4	(Australia) **K-A Guse** (United Kingdom) **V Lake**	**6**	**6**
(France) A Dechaume-Balleret (France) A Fusai	3	4
(Netherlands) C Bakkum (United States) A Leand	**6**	3	2
3	(United States) **S Collins** (South Africa) **M de Swardt**	1	**6**	**6**
(China) **L-L Chen** (China) **F Li**	2	**6**	**6**
(Australia) J Byrne (Australia) N Pratt	**6**	3	1

Semifinals
(Germany) A Kerek (Germany) M Zivec-Skulj	3	4
4	(Australia) **K-A Guse** (United Kingdom) **V Lake**	**6**	**6**
3	(United States) S Collins (South Africa) M de Swardt	5	4
(China) **L-L Chen** (China) **F Li**	**7**	**6**

Final
4	(Australia) Kerry-Anne Guse (United Kingdom) Valda Lake	0	2
(China) **Chen Li-Ling** (China) **Li Fang**	**6**	**6**
