= Smekal =

Smékal (Czech feminine: Smékalová) or Smekal is a surname of Czech language origin (variation of Smejkal). Notable people with the surname include:

- Adolf Smekal (1895–1959), Austrian physicist
- Daniel Smékal (born 2001), Czech footballer
- Florence Marly, born Hana Smékalová (1919–1978), Czech-French actress
- Magdaléna Smékalová (born 2006), Czech tennis player
- Renata Šmekálová (born 1969), Slovak professional tennis player

== See also ==
- Šmejkal/Smejkal
- Renata Šmekálová
