= Andrea Müller =

Andrea Müller may refer to:

- Andrea Müller (athlete) (born 1974), German track and field athlete
- Andrea Müller (tennis) (born 1965), German professional tennis player
