= 1994 Nokia Open =

- Date: 14–20 February
- Edition: 2nd
- Category: Tier IV
- Draw: 32S / 16D
- Prize money: $100,000
- Surface: Hard / indoors
- Location: Beijing, China

Champions

Singles
- (Indonesia) Yayuk Basuki

Doubles
- (China) Chen Li-Ling / (China) Fang Li
| ← 1993 · | Nokia Open | · 1995 → |

The 1994 Nokia Open was a women's tennis tournament played on indoor hard courts at the Beijing Comprehensive Gym in Beijing, China that was part of Tier IV of the 1994 WTA Tour. The tournament was held from 14 February through 20 February 1994. Second-seeded Yayuk Basuki won the singles title and earned $18,000 first-prize money.

== Finals ==
=== Singles ===
(Indonesia) Yayuk Basuki defeated (Japan) Kyoko Nagatsuka 6–4, 6–2

- It was Basuki's 1st singles title of the year and the 5th of her career.

=== Doubles ===
(China) Chen Li-Ling / (China) Fang Li defeated (Australia) Kerry-Anne Guse / (United Kingdom) Valda Lake 6–0, 6–2

- It was Chen's only title of the year and the 1st of her career. It was Li's only title of the year and the 2nd of her career.
