= Esmir Hoogendoorn =

Dutch tennis player

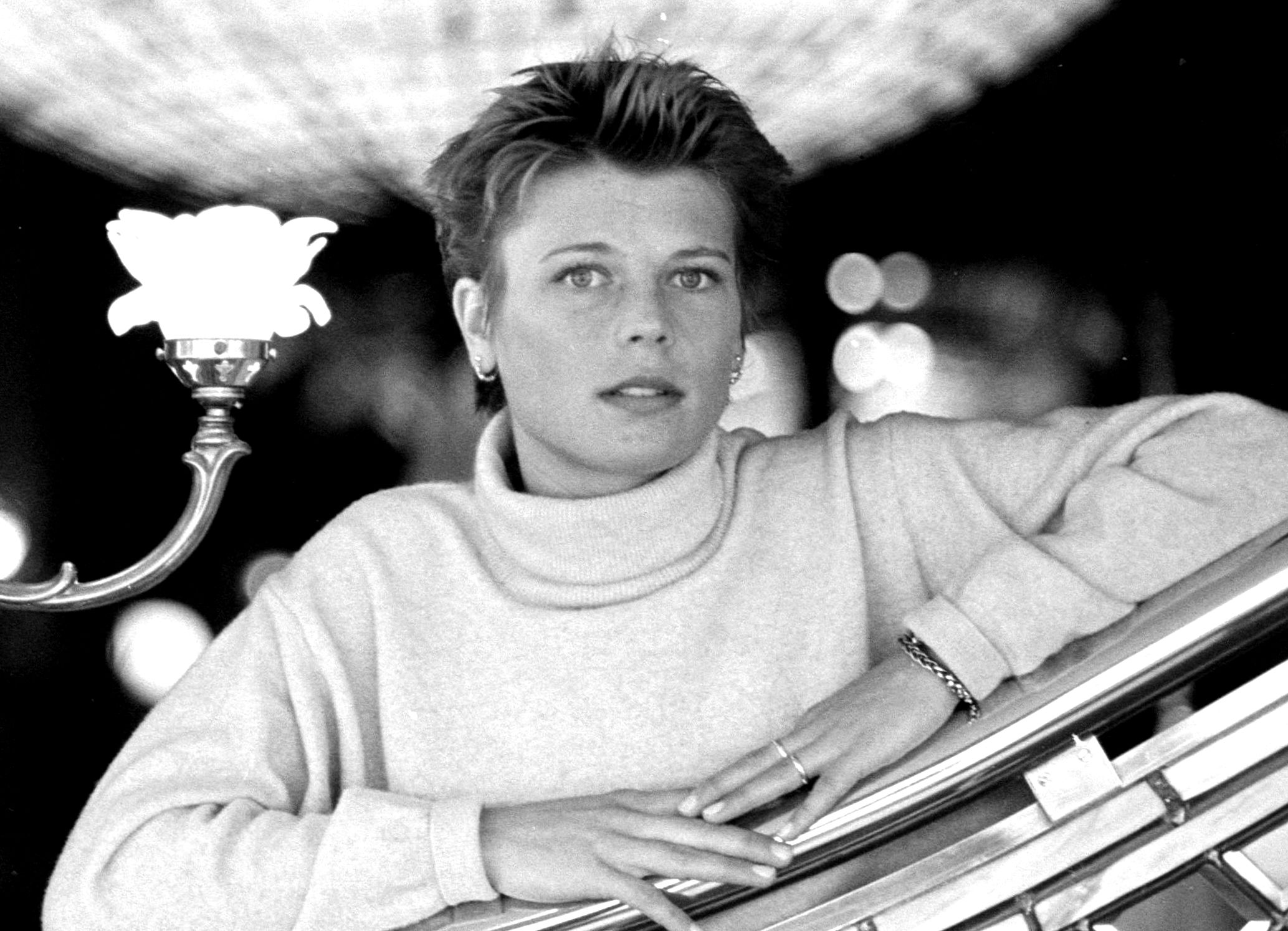
- Esmir Hoogendoorn, 1995
- Country (sports): Netherlands
- Born: 31 March 1969 (age 56)
- Retired: 1994
- Prize money: $33,597

Singles
- Career titles: 1 ITF
- Highest ranking: No. 155 (24 August 1992)

Grand Slam singles results
- French Open: Q2 (1993)
- US Open: Q1 (1992)

Doubles
- Career titles: 4 ITF
- Highest ranking: No. 247 (12 November 1990)

Esmir Hoogendoorn (born 31 March 1969) is a Dutch former professional tennis player.

Hoogendoorn started on tour in the late 1980s and reached a best ranking of 155 in the world, with her best WTA Tour performance coming at the 1992 Belgian Open, where she made it through to the quarter-finals as a lucky loser. She retired from professional tennis in 1994.

== ITF finals ==
=== Singles: 2 (1–1) ===
Result	No.	Date	Tournament	Surface	Opponent	Score
Win	1.	11 September 1989	Setúbal, Portugal	Hard	(Denmark) Pernilla Sorensen	6–1, 6–3
Loss	2.	5 November 1990	Fez, Morocco	Clay	(Netherlands) Olivia Gravereaux	6–1, 3–6, 6–7^{(9–11)}

=== Doubles: 5 (4–1) ===
Result	No.	Date	Tournament	Surface	Partner	Opponents	Score
Win	1.	8 May 1989	Schwarzach, Austria	Clay	(West Germany) Stefanie Rehmke	(Hungary) Virág Csurgó (Hungary) Nóra Köves	W/O
Loss	1.	11 September 1989	Setúbal, Portugal	Hard	(Netherlands) Colette Sely	(Australia) Danielle Jones (Australia) Lisa Keller	1–6, 3–6
Win	2.	20 August 1990	Chiang Mai, Thailand	Hard	(Netherlands) Claire Wegink	(Hong Kong) Paulette Moreno (Thailand) Orawan Thampensri	6–3, 1–6, 6–1
Win	3.	27 August 1990	Korat, Thailand	Hard	(Netherlands) Claire Wegink	(South Korea) Choi Jin (South Korea) Choi Jeom-sang	7–6^{(2)}, 6–2
Win	4.	10 September 1990	Bangkok, Thailand	Hard	(Netherlands) Claire Wegink	(West Germany) Sabine Lohmann (West Germany) Ulrike Przysucha	6–0, 6–1
