= Dalia Koriat =

Israeli tennis player

- Native name: דליה קוריאט
- Country (sports): Israel
- Born: 5 November 1969 (age 55)
- Prize money: US$ 16,716

Singles
- Career record: 3–2 (Federation Cup)
- Highest ranking: No. 297 (9 July 1990)

Doubles
- Career record: 2–2 (Federation Cup)
- Highest ranking: No. 293 (20 June 1988)
Medal record
Maccabiah Games
Silver medal – second place	1989 Israel	Women's doubles

Dalia Koriat (Hebrew: דליה קוריאט; born 5 November 1969) is an Israeli former professional tennis player.

Active on tour in the 1980s, Koriat was a product of Israel Tennis Centers. She won the Eddie Herr Junior Championships in 1987. As a member of the Israel Federation Cup team she featured in a total of five ties, for three singles and two doubles wins. In 1989 she won a silver medal in women's doubles at the Maccabiah Games.

== ITF finals ==
=== Singles: 4 (0–4) ===
Result	No.	Date	Tournament	Surface	Opponent	Score
Loss	1.	Nov 1987	Jerusalem, Israel	Hard	(Israel) Ilana Berger	3–6, 2–6
Loss	2.	Nov 1988	Haifa, Israel	Hard	(United States) Debbie Spence	5–7, 0–6
Loss	3.	Mar 1989	Ramat Hasharon, Israel	Hard	(Netherlands) Marianne van der Torre	2–6, 1–6
Loss	4.	Nov 1990	Ashkelon, Israel	Clay	(Israel) Ilana Berger	5–7, 1–6

=== Doubles: 2 (2–2) ===
Result	No.	Date	Tournament	Surface	Partner	Opponents	Score
Win	1.	Nov 1986	Jerusalem, Israel	Hard	(Israel) Sagit Doron	(Netherlands) Mara Eijkenboom (Germany) Christine Hein	7–6, 3–6, 6–2
Loss	1.	Mar 1988	Jaffa, Israel	Hard	(Finland) Petra Thorén	(Sweden) Eva Lena Olsson (Sweden) Lena Sandin	6–4, 5–7, 2–6
Win	2.	Aug 1990	Roanoke, United States	Hard	(Israel) Medi Dadoch	(Israel) Ilana Berger (Israel) Limor Zaltz	2–6, 6–4, 6–4
Loss	2.	Nov 1990	Ashkelon, Israel	Clay	(Israel) Medi Dadoch	(Israel) Ilana Berger (Israel) Limor Zaltz	6–4, 1–6, 1–6

== See also ==
- List of Israel Fed Cup team representatives
