= 1994 Salem Open-Beijing – Doubles =

Doubles
- 1994 Salem Open-Beijing and the Nokia Open

Final
- Champion: (United States) Tommy Ho (United States) Kent Kinnear
- Runner-up: (South Africa) David Adams (Russia) Andrei Olhovskiy
- Score: 7–6, 6–3

Events
Singles	men	women
Doubles	men	women
← 1993 ·	Salem Open-Beijing	· 1995 →
← 1993 ·	Nokia Open	· 1995 →

Paul Annacone and Doug Flach were the defending champions, but did not participate this year.

Tommy Ho and Kent Kinnear won the title, defeating David Adams and Andrei Olhovskiy 7–6, 6–3 in the final.

== Seeds ==
1. (South Africa) David Adams / (Russia) Andrei Olhovskiy (final)
2. (Sweden) Henrik Holm / (Sweden) Anders Järryd (quarterfinals)
3. (United States) Jim Grabb / (United States) Alex O'Brien (semifinals)
4. (United States) Rick Leach / (United States) Brett Steven (semifinals)

== Draw ==
=== Key ===
- Q = Qualifier
- WC = Wild card
- LL = Lucky loser
- Alt = Alternate
- SE = Special exempt
- PR = Protected ranking
- ITF = ITF entry
- JE = Junior exempt
- w/o = Walkover
- r = Retired
- d = Defaulted
- SR = Special ranking

=== Draw ===
First round
1	(South Africa) D Adams (Russia) A Olhovskiy	6	6	6
(United Kingdom) M Petchey (Sweden) L-A Wahlgren	7	2	4
(Malaysia) A Malik (Sweden) T Nydahl	4	4
(Australia) J Eagle (Australia) A Florent	6	6
3	(United States) J Grabb (United States) A O'Brien	5	6	6
(United States) T Kronemann (Australia) D Macpherson	7	3	4
(Germany) A Mronz (Australia) M Tebbutt	6	3	4
Q	(Australia) J Morgan (United States) R Weiss	4	6	6
(Venezuela) N Pereira (Venezuela) M Ruah	3	7	3
(United States) B Devening (South Africa) C van Rensburg	6	6	6
WC	(China) Guo Jian (China) Xu Xin	4	2
4	(United States) R Leach (New Zealand) B Steven	6	6
(United States) T Ho (United States) K Kinnear	6	6
WC	(China) J Xia (China) J Zhang	2	1
WC	(United States) C Chang (China) B Pan	2	5
2	(Sweden) H Holm (Sweden) A Järryd	6	7

Quarterfinals
1	(South Africa) D Adams (Russia) A Olhovskiy	4	6	6
(Australia) J Eagle (Australia) A Florent	6	3	3
3	(United States) J Grabb (United States) A O'Brien	1	6	6
Q	(Australia) J Morgan (United States) R Weiss	6	3	3
(United States) B Devening (South Africa) C van Rensburg	5	6
4	(United States) R Leach (New Zealand) B Steven	7	7
(United States) T Ho (United States) K Kinnear	6	6	6
2	(Sweden) H Holm (Sweden) A Järryd	7	3	3

Semifinals
1	(South Africa) D Adams (Russia) A Olhovskiy	7	6
3	(United States) J Grabb (United States) A O'Brien	6	4
4	(United States) R Leach (New Zealand) B Steven	6	3	6
(United States) T Ho (United States) K Kinnear	3	6	7

Final
1	(South Africa) D Adams (Russia) A Olhovskiy	6	3
(United States) T Ho (United States) K Kinnear	7	6
