= Michèle Strebel =

Swiss tennis player (born 1970)

- Full name: Michèle Sjögren-Strebel
- Country (sports): Switzerland
- Born: 24 April 1970 (age 55)
- Prize money: $42,832

Singles
- Career record: 62–62
- Career titles: 1 ITF
- Highest ranking: No. 217 (7 November 1988)

Doubles
- Career record: 46–44
- Career titles: 2 ITF
- Highest ranking: No. 128 (2 January 1989)

Grand Slam doubles results
- French Open: 2R (1991)

Michèle Sjögren-Strebel (born 24 April 1970) is a Swiss former professional tennis player.

Strebel reached a best singles ranking of 217 in the world and was ranked as high as 128 in doubles. She twice appeared in the main-draw French Open women's doubles, in 1989 and 1991, with her best performance coming in the latter where she and partner Manuela Maleeva made the second round.

In 1992, she played in two doubles rubbers for the Switzerland Federation Cup team, the first of them with Maleeva in the first round of the World Group against Sweden, a live rubber which they lost in three sets to Maria Lindström and Maria Strandlund. She also featured for Switzerland in the subsequent World Group play-off against Paraguay and this time won in the doubles (partnering Emanuela Zardo), to round off a 3–0 win in the tie.

== ITF Circuit finals ==
$25,000 tournaments
$10,000 tournaments

=== Singles: 3 (1–2) ===
Result	No.	Date	Tournament	Surface	Opponent	Score
Loss	1.	7 September 1987	ITF Bogotá, Colombia	Clay	(Brazil) Luciana Tella	6–3, 4–6, 0–2 ret.
Loss	2.	28 September 1987	ITF Santiago, Chile	Clay	(Peru) Karim Strohmeier	4–6, 1–6
Win	1.	14 October 1991	ITF Burgdorf, Switzerland	Carpet (i)	(Switzerland) Natalie Tschan	6–3, 7–6^{(7)}

=== Doubles: 8 (2–6) ===
Result	No.	Date	Tournament	Surface	Partner	Opponents	Score
Win	1.	28 September 1987	ITF Santiago, Chile	Clay	(Uruguay) Patricia Miller	(Chile) Macarena Miranda (Argentina) Andrea Tiezzi	6–4, 6–2
Loss	1.	18 April 1988	ITF Reggio Emilia, Italy	Clay	(Brazil) Luciana Tella	(Netherlands) Hellas ter Riet (United States) Jennifer Fuchs	0–6, 4–6
Loss	2.	17 July 1989	ITF Darmstadt, West Germany	Clay	(Sweden) Maria Ekstrand	(Czechoslovakia) Nora Bajčíková (Czechoslovakia) Petra Holubová	3–6, 2–6
Loss	3.	15 October 1990	ITF Burgdorf, Switzerland	Carpet (i)	(Switzerland) Natalie Tschan	(West Germany) Sabine Lohmann (Netherlands) Claire Wegink	6–4, 2–-6, 4–6
Loss	4.	26 November 1990	ITF Okada, Nigeria	Hard	(West Germany) Sabine Lohmann	(Netherlands) Yvonne Grubben (Netherlands) Heleen van den Berg	2–6, 5–7
Loss	5.	14 October 1991	ITF Burgdorf, Switzerland	Carpet (i)	(Switzerland) Natalie Tschan	(Ukraine) Olga Lugina (Israel) Nelly Barkan	4–6, 6–1, 4–6
Loss	6.	11 November 1991	ITF Swindon, United Kingdom	Carpet (i)	(Belgium) Els Callens	(Israel) Ilana Berger (South Africa) Tessa Price	2–6, 5–7
Win	2.	12 April 1992	ITF Limoges, France	Carpet (i)	(Belgium) Els Callens	(Bulgaria) Lubomira Bacheva (Czechoslovakia) Sylvia Štefková	4–6, 6–1, 6–4

== See also ==
- List of Switzerland Fed Cup team representatives
