= Els Callens =

Belgian tennis player

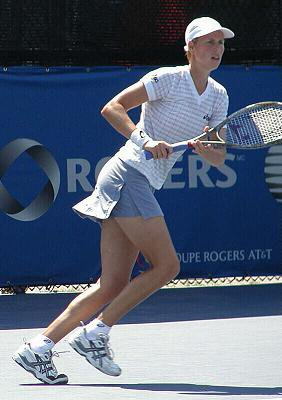
- Els Callens at the 2003 Rogers Cup
- Country (sports): Belgium
- Residence: Antwerp, Belgium
- Born: 20 August 1970 (age 55) Antwerp
- Height: 1.78 m (5 ft 10 in)
- Turned pro: 1990
- Retired: 2011
- Plays: Right-handed (two-handed backhand)
- Prize money: $1,666,023

Singles
- Career record: 358–309
- Career titles: 0 WTA, 11 ITF
- Highest ranking: No. 43 (17 February 1997)

Grand Slam singles results
- Australian Open: 3R (2000)
- French Open: 2R (1995, 1998, 1999, 2000)
- Wimbledon: 3R (2002)
- US Open: 3R (1996)

Doubles
- Career record: 315–224
- Career titles: 10 WTA, 10 ITF
- Highest ranking: No. 12 (14 May 2001)

Grand Slam doubles results
- Australian Open: QF (2000)
- French Open: QF (1999)
- Wimbledon: QF (1997, 1998)
- US Open: SF (2000)

Team competitions
- Fed Cup: W (2001); Record 26–13
Medal record
Olympic Games
| Bronze medal – third place | 2000 Sydney | Doubles |

Els Callens (born 20 August 1970) is a former professional female tennis player from Belgium.

Callens became professional in January 1990. Her biggest achievement came in 2000 during the Summer Olympic Games in Sydney where she won the bronze medal in women's doubles, partnering Dominique Van Roost-Monami.

She retired on 26 October 2005, after losing her second-round match at the Gaz de France Stars tournament in Hasselt. She started a comeback, and finally retired from professional tennis in 2011.

Nowadays, she works as sports commentator for the Belgian public broadcast Eén.

== WTA career finals ==
=== Singles: 1 (runner-up) ===
Legend
Tier I (0–0)
Tier II (0–0)
Tier III (0–1)
Tier IV & V (0–0)

| Result | No. | Date | Tournament | Surface | Opponent | Score |
|---|---|---|---|---|---|---|
| Loss | 1. | Oct 1996 | Tournoi de Québec, Canada | Carpet (i) | (United States) Lisa Raymond | 4–6, 4–6 |

=== Doubles: 22 (10 titles, 12 runner-ups) ===
Legend
Tier I (1–0)
Tier II (3–3)
Tier III (3–3)
Tier IV & V (3–6)

| Result | No. | Date | Tournament | Surface | Partner | Opponents | Score |
|---|---|---|---|---|---|---|---|
| Win | 1. | Jan 1996 | Auckland Open, New Zealand | Clay | (France) Julie Halard-Decugis | (Canada) Jill Hetherington (Australia) Kristine Kunce | 6–1, 6–0 |
| Loss | 1. | May 1996 | Welsh Open, Wales | Clay | (Belgium) Laurence Courtois | (United States) Katrina Adams (South Africa) Mariaan de Swardt | 0–6, 4–6 |
| Win | 2. | Jun 1998 | Birmingham Classic, England | Grass | (France) Julie Halard-Decugis | (United States) Lisa Raymond (Australia) Rennae Stubbs | 2–6, 6–4, 6–4 |
| Win | 3. | Nov 1998 | Pattaya Open, Thailand | Hard | (France) Julie Halard-Decugis | (Japan) Rika Hiraki (Poland) Aleksandra Olsza | 3–6, 6–2, 6–2 |
| Win | 4. | Aug 2000 | Los Angeles Championships, U.S. | Hard | (Belgium) Dominique Van Roost | (United States) Kimberly Po (France) Anne-Gaëlle Sidot | 6–2, 7–5 |
| Loss | 2. | Nov 2000 | Tournoi de Québec, Canada | Carpet (i) | (United States) Kimberly Po | (Australia) Nicole Pratt (United States) Meghann Shaughnessy | 3–6, 4–6 |
| Win | 5. | May 2001 | German Open | Clay | (United States) Meghann Shaughnessy | (Zimbabwe) Cara Black (Russia) Elena Likhovtseva | 6–4, 6–3 |
| Win | 6. | May 2001 | Belgian Open | Clay | (Spain) Virginia Ruano Pascual | (Netherlands) Kristie Boogert (Netherlands) Miriam Oremans | 6–3, 3–6, 6–4 |
| Loss | 3. | Sep 2001 | Waikoloa Championships, U.S. | Hard | (Australia) Nicole Pratt | (Slovenia) Tina Križan (Slovenia) Katarina Srebotnik | 2–6, 3–6 |
| Loss | 4. | Oct 2001 | Linz Open, Austria | Hard (i) | (United States) Chanda Rubin | (Socialist Federal Republic of Yugoslavia) Jelena Dokić (Russia) Nadia Petrova | 1–6, 4–6 |
| Loss | 5. | Feb 2002 | Toyota Princess Cup, Japan | Carpet (i) | (Italy) Roberta Vinci | (United States) Lisa Raymond (Australia) Rennae Stubbs | 1–6, 1–6 |
| Loss | 6. | Apr 2002 | Sarasota Clay Court Classic, U.S. | Clay | (Spain) Conchita Martínez | (Socialist Federal Republic of Yugoslavia) Jelena Dokić (Russia) Elena Likhovtseva | 7–6^{(7–5)}, 3–6, 3–6 |
| Win | 7. | Jun 2002 | Birmingham Classic, England | Grass | (Japan) Shinobu Asagoe | (United States) Kimberly Po (France) Nathalie Tauziat | 6–4, 6–3 |
| Win | 8. | Jun 2003 | Birmingham Classic, England | Grass | (United States) Meilen Tu | (Australia) Alicia Molik (United States) Martina Navratilova | 7–5, 6–4 |
| Loss | 7. | Aug 2003 | Los Angeles Classic, U.S. | Hard | (Russia) Elena Bovina | (France) Mary Pierce (Australia) Rennae Stubbs | 3–6, 3–6 |
| Loss | 8. | Nov 2003 | Tournoi de Québec, Canada | Carpet (i) | (United States) Meilen Tu | (China) Ting Li (China) Sun Tiantian | 3–6, 3–6 |
| Loss | 9. | Jan 2004 | Hobart International, Australia | Hard | (Austria) Barbara Schett | (Japan) Shinobu Asagoe (Japan) Seiko Okamoto | 6–2, 4–6, 3–6 |
| Win | 9. | Feb 2004 | Diamond Games Antwerp, Belgium | Hard (i) | (Zimbabwe) Cara Black | (Switzerland) Myriam Casanova (Greece) Eleni Daniilidou | 6–2, 6–2 |
| Loss | 10. | Apr 2004 | Casablanca Grand Prix, Morocco | Clay | (Slovenia) Katarina Srebotnik | (France) Marion Bartoli (France) Émilie Loit | 4–6, 2–6 |
| Loss | 11. | Aug 2004 | Vancouver Open, Canada | Hard | (Germany) Anna-Lena Grönefeld | (United States) Bethanie Mattek (United States) Abigail Spears | 3–6, 3–6 |
| Loss | 12. | Nov 2004 | Tournoi de Québec, Canada | Hard (i) | (Australia) Samantha Stosur | (United States) Carly Gullickson (Argentina) María Emilia Salerni | 5–7, 5–7 |
| Win | 10. | Feb 2005 | Diamond Games Antwerp, Belgium | Hard (i) | (Zimbabwe) Cara Black | (Spain) Anabel Medina Garrigues (Russia) Dinara Safina | 3–6, 6–4, 6–4 |

== ITF Circuit finals ==
$100,000 tournaments
$75,000 tournaments
$50,000 tournaments
$25,000 tournaments
$10,000 tournaments

=== Singles: 14 (11–3) ===
| Result | No. | Date | Tournament | Surface | Opponent | Score |
|---|---|---|---|---|---|---|
| Win | 1. | 19 February 1990 | ITF Manchester, United Kingdom | Carpet (i) | (Netherlands) Sandra Begijn | 6–1, 6–0 |
| Win | 2. | 7 May 1990 | ITF Cascais, Portugal | Clay | (Netherlands) Claire Wegink | 6–1, 6–1 |
| Win | 3. | 21 January 1991 | ITF Bergen, Norway | Carpet (i) | (Poland) Magdalena Feistel | 6–4, 6–3 |
| Loss | 1. | 11 February 1991 | ITF Danderyd, Sweden | Carpet (i) | (Sweden) Catarina Lindqvist | 4–6, 6–4, 2–6 |
| Win | 4. | 18 February 1991 | ITF Croydon, United Kingdom | Carpet (i) | (United Kingdom) Sara Gomer | 6–1, 6–0 |
| Win | 5. | 21 October 1991 | ITF Swindon, United Kingdom | Carpet (i) | (Sweden) Cecilia Dahlman | 3–6, 7–5, 6–4 |
| Win | 6. | 19 October 1992 | ITF Moulins, France | Hard (i) | (Czechoslovakia) Petra Holubová | 5–7, 6–2, 6–3 |
| Win | 7. | 31 October 1993 | ITF Poitiers, France | Hard (i) | (France) Lea Ghirardi | 6–0, 6–1 |
| Win | 8. | 21 March 1994 | ITF Brest, France | Hard (i) | (Madagascar) Dally Randriantefy | 6–4, 6–3 |
| Loss | 2. | 14 December 1997 | ITF Bad Gögging, Germany | Carpet (i) | (France) Nathalie Dechy | 4–6, 1–6 |
| Loss | 3. | 22 August 1999 | Bronx Open, United States | Hard | (United States) Erika deLone | 1–6, ret. |
| Win | 9. | 24 October 1999 | ITF Southampton, UK | Carpet (i) | (Austria) Patricia Wartusch | 6–3, 6–3 |
| Win | 10. | 30 October 2001 | ITF Bolton, United Kingdom | Hard (i) | (Morocco) Bahia Mouhtassine | 4–6, 6–4, 6–1 |
| Win | 11. | 26 November 2002 | ITF Minneapolis, United States | Hard (i) | (Slovakia) Stanislava Hrozenská | 7–5, 6–3 |

=== Doubles: 17 (10–7) ===
| Result | No. | Date | Tournament | Surface | Partner | Opponents | Score |
|---|---|---|---|---|---|---|---|
| Win | 1. | 26 February 1990 | ITF Wigan, United Kingdom | Hard (i) | (Belgium) Caroline Wuillot | (Sweden) Jenny Thielmann (Netherlands) Claire Wegink | 7–5, 6–0 |
| Win | 2. | 11 June 1990 | ITF Cascais, Portugal | Clay | (Belgium) Caroline Wuillot | (Netherlands) Ingelise Driehuis (Australia) Louise Pleming | 2–6, 6–4, 7–6^{(6)} |
| Win | 3. | 6 August 1990 | ITF Rebecq, Belgium | Clay | (Belgium) Caroline Wuillot | (Romania) Ruxandra Dragomir (Romania) Irina Spîrlea | 6–4, 6–2 |
| Loss | 1. | 10 September 1990 | ITF Eastbourne, United Kingdom | Hard | (West Germany) Tanja Hauschildt | (Sweden) Maria Lindström (United States) Heather Ludloff | 6–7^{(6)}, 1–6 |
| Loss | 2. | 11 November 1991 | ITF Swindon, United Kingdom | Carpet (i) | (Switzerland) Michèle Strebel | (Israel) Ilana Berger (South Africa) Tessa Price | 2–6, 5–7 |
| Win | 4. | 12 April 1992 | ITF Limoges, France | Carpet (i) | (Switzerland) Michèle Strebel | (Bulgaria) Lubomira Bacheva (Czechoslovakia) Sylvia Štefková | 4–6, 6–1, 6–4 |
| Loss | 3. | 14 September 1992 | ITF Madeira, Portugal | Hard | (Germany) Julia Jehs | (Denmark) Karin Ptaszek (Sweden) Marianne Vallin | 1–6, 3–6 |
| Win | 5. | 22 November 1992 | ITF Nottingham, United Kingdom | Carpet (i) | (Bulgaria) Elena Pampoulova | (Romania) Ruxandra Dragomir (Romania) Irina Spîrlea | 7–6^{(3)}, 6–4 |
| Loss | 4. | 31 October 1993 | ITF Poitiers, France | Hard (i) | (Belgium) Nancy Feber | (Ukraine) Olga Lugina (Bulgaria) Elena Pampoulova | 4–6, 6–3, 3–6 |
| Win | 6. | 27 March 1994 | ITF Brest, France | Hard (i) | (Denmark) Karin Ptaszek | (Italy) Susanna Attili (Italy) Elena Savoldi | 6–4, 6–1 |
| Win | 7. | 29 March 1997 | ITF Woodlands, United States | Hard | (South Africa) Liezel Horn | (France) Nathalie Dechy (France) Lea Ghirardi | 6–4, 6–2 |
| Win | 8. | 21 September 1998 | ITF Seattle, United States | Hard | (South Africa) Liezel Horn | (United States) Lilia Osterloh (United States) Mashona Washington | 6–2, 3–6, 6–3 |
| Win | 9. | 18 October 1998 | ITF Southampton, United Kingdom | Carpet (i) | (Belgium) Laurence Courtois | (France) Amélie Cocheteux (France) Émilie Loit | 6–2, 6–2 |
| Loss | 5. | 13 August 2001 | Bronx Open, United States | Hard | (Netherlands) Kristie Boogert | (Argentina) Clarisa Fernández (Japan) Rika Fujiwara | 6–2, 6–7^{(3)}, 4–6 |
| Win | 10. | 26 November 2002 | ITF Minneapolis, United States | Hard (i) | (Japan) Shinobu Asagoe | (Japan) Rika Hiraki (Japan) Nana Smith | 7–6^{(3)}, 7–6^{(3)} |
| Loss | 6. | 9 November 2004 | ITF Pittsburgh, United States | Hard (i) | (Australia) Samantha Stosur | (United States) Teryn Ashley (United States) Laura Granville | 6–2, 3–6, 4–6 |
| Loss | 7. | 4 July 2011 | ITF Brussels, Belgium | Clay | (Belgium) Nancy Feber | (Netherlands) Marcella Koek (Netherlands) Eva Wacanno | 5–7, 6–3, [5–10] |
