= Rona Mayer =

Israeli tennis player

- Native name: רונה מאיר
- Country (sports): Israel
- Born: 11 July 1973 (age 51)
- Prize money: $11,777

Singles
- Highest ranking: No. 314 (29 April 1991)

Grand Slam singles results
- Australian Open: Q1 (1990)

Doubles
- Highest ranking: No. 288 (11 March 1991)

Rona Mayer (Hebrew: רונה מאיר; born 11 July 1973) is an Israeli former professional tennis player.

Mayer played in two Federation Cup doubles rubbers for Israel in 1989, partnering junior teammate Limor Zaltz, for a loss to South Korea and a win against Jamaica.

Across 1989 and 1990, she featured in several overseas professional ITF tournaments while playing juniors. She and Zaltz were the girls' doubles champions at the 1990 Australian Open.

After 1990 she played in only Israeli satellites and in 1994 she transferred to Harvard as a sophomore student.

== ITF finals ==
=== Doubles: 1 (0–1) ===
Outcome	No.	Date	Tournament	Surface	Partner	Opponents	Score
Runner-up	1.	22 October 1990	Lyss, Switzerland	Clay	(Israel) Ilana Berger	(Germany) Sabine Lohmann (Netherlands) Claire Wegink	1–6, 5–7

== See also ==
- List of Israel Fed Cup team representatives
