= 1994 Salem Open-Beijing – Singles =

Singles
- 1994 Salem Open-Beijing and the Nokia Open

Final
- Champion: (United States) Michael Chang
- Runner-up: (Sweden) Anders Järryd
- Score: 7–5, 7–5

Details
- Draw: 32
- Seeds: 8

Events
Singles	men	women
Doubles	men	women
← 1993 ·	Salem Open-Beijing	· 1995 →
← 1993 ·	Nokia Open	· 1995 →

Michael Chang was the defending champion.

Chang successfully defended his title, beating Anders Järryd 7–5, 7–5 in the final.

== Seeds ==
1. (United States) Michael Chang (champion)
2. (United States) David Wheaton (second round)
3. (Sweden) Henrik Holm (first round)
4. (United States) Jeff Tarango (first round)
5. (Russia) Andrei Olhovskiy (quarterfinals)
6. (United States) Alex O'Brien (first round)
7. (United States) Jim Grabb (second round)
8. (United Kingdom) Mark Petchey (second round)

== Draw ==
=== Key ===
- Q = Qualifier
- WC = Wild card
- LL = Lucky loser
- Alt = Alternate
- SE = Special exempt
- PR = Protected ranking
- ITF = ITF entry
- JE = Junior exempt
- w/o = Walkover
- r = Retired
- d = Defaulted
- SR = Special ranking

=== Finals ===
Semifinals
1	(United States) Michael Chang	7	6
(New Zealand) Brett Steven	5	3
(South Africa) David Adams	6^{9}	6^{4}
(Sweden) Anders Järryd	7^{11}	7^{7}

Final
1	(United States) Michael Chang	7	7
(Sweden) Anders Järryd	5	5

=== Top half ===
First round
1	(United States) M Chang	6	4	6
(Venezuela) M Ruah	4	6	3
(United States) T Ho	6	3	6^{6}
(Japan) S Matsuoka	3	6	7^{8}
(Germany) A Mronz	7^{7}	2	6
WC	(China) B Pan	6^{5}	6	4
Q	(United States) R Matuszewski	3	0
8	(United Kingdom) M Petchey	6	6
3	(Sweden) H Holm	6^{4}	6^{7}
(South Africa) C van Rensburg	7^{7}	7^{9}
(New Zealand) B Steven	6	6
(Ukraine) D Poliakov	4	3
(Venezuela) N Pereira	2	7^{7}	7^{7}
(Australia) M Tebbutt	6	6^{3}	6^{5}
(Germany) M Sinner	4	4
5	(Russia) A Olhovskiy	6	6

Second round
1	(United States) M Chang	7^{7}	6
(Japan) S Matsuoka	6^{4}	4
(Germany) A Mronz	7^{7}	7
8	(United Kingdom) M Petchey	6^{2}	5
(South Africa) C van Rensburg	4	3
(New Zealand) B Steven	6	6
(Venezuela) N Pereira	4	2
5	(Russia) A Olhovskiy	6	6

Quarterfinals
1	(United States) M Chang	6	6
(Germany) A Mronz	2	3
(New Zealand) B Steven	6	4	6
5	(Russia) A Olhovskiy	2	6	3

Semifinals
1	(United States) M Chang	7	6
(New Zealand) B Steven	5	3

=== Bottom half ===
First round
6	(United States) A O'Brien	5	6	3
(Sweden) T Nydahl	7	3	6
Q	(United States) R Leach	6	6
(Australia) N Borwick	4	2
(South Africa) D Adams	7^{7}	6
(Australia) J Morgan	6^{4}	4
Q	(United States) K Kinnear	6	6
4	(United States) J Tarango	4	2
7	(United States) J Grabb	3	6	6
(Australia) T Woodbridge	6	2	3
WC	(China) J Xia	2	1
Q	(Canada) A Chang	6	6
(Sweden) A Järryd	6	6
(United States) R Weiss	0	1
(United States) S Bryan	3	2
2	(United States) D Wheaton	6	6

Second round
(Sweden) T Nydahl	6	6
Q	(United States) R Leach	4	4
(South Africa) D Adams	7	2	6
Q	(United States) K Kinnear	5	6	3
7	(United States) J Grabb	3	4
Q	(Canada) A Chang	6	6
(Sweden) A Järryd	5	6	6
2	(United States) D Wheaton	7	3	1

Quarterfinals
(Sweden) T Nydahl	3	6	4
(South Africa) D Adams	6	1	6
Q	(Canada) A Chang	7	2	3
(Sweden) A Järryd	5	6	6

Semifinals
(South Africa) D Adams	6^{9}	6^{4}
(Sweden) A Järryd	7^{11}	7^{7}
