= Lisa Tang =

Chinese tennis player

- Full name: Tang Liyao
- Country (sports): China
- Born: 23 January 1974 (age 51)
- Prize money: $11,228

Singles
- Career record: 30–34
- Career titles: 1 ITF
- Highest ranking: No. 410 (4 July 1994)

Doubles
- Career record: 27–25
- Career titles: 3 ITF
- Highest ranking: No. 350 (13 June 1994)

Tang Liyao (born 23 January 1974), also known as Lisa Tang, is a Chinese former professional tennis player.

Tang, who played in the juniors at Wimbledon, qualified for the main draw of the 1994 Nokia Open in Beijing and won her first round match, over Chinese wildcard Yi Jing-Qian. She had a career high singles ranking of 410 in the world.

== ITF finals ==
=== Singles: 1 (1–0) ===
Outcome	No.	Date	Tournament	Surface	Opponent	Score
Winner	1.	26 May 1996	Nanjing, China	Hard	(China) Liu Li	6–2, 6–0

=== Doubles: 3 (3–0) ===
Outcome	No.	Date	Tournament	Surface	Partner	Opponents	Score
Winner	1,	2 April 1995	Jakarta, Indonesia	Hard	(Thailand) Benjamas Sangaram	(Japan) Yuko Hosoki (South Korea) Park In-sook	5–7, 7–5, 6–3
Winner	2.	19 May 1996	Beijing, China	Hard	(China) Yang Li-hua	(China) Li Yan-Ling (China) Liu Li	6–2, 6–3
Winner	3.	26 May 1996	Nanjing, China	Hard	(China) Yang Li-hua	(South Korea) Sohn Hyun-hee (South Korea) Shun Hyun-a	6–4, 1–0
