= 1993 Salem Open-Beijing =

- Date: October 18–24
- Edition: 1st
- Category: World Series
- Draw: 32S / 16D
- Prize money: $275,000
- Surface: Carpet / indoor
- Location: Beijing, China

Champions

Singles
- (United States) Michael Chang

Doubles
- (United States) Paul Annacone / (United States) Doug Flach
Salem Open-Beijing	· 1994 →

The 1993 Salem Open-Beijing was a men's tennis tournament played on indoor carpet courts. It was the inaugural edition of the China Open, and is part of the World Series of the 1993 ATP Tour. The event was held at the Beijing International Tennis Center in Beijing, China. First-seeded The event took place from October 18 to October 24, 1993. First-seeded Michael Chang won the singles title.

== Finals ==
=== Singles ===
(United States) Michael Chang defeated. (Canada) Greg Rusedski, 7–6^{(7–5)}, 6–7^{(6–8)}, 6–4

- It was Chang's 5th singles title of the year and the 13th of his career.

=== Doubles ===
(United States) Paul Annacone / (United States) Doug Flach defeated (Netherlands) Jacco Eltingh / (Netherlands) Paul Haarhuis, 7–6, 6–3
