= Caroline Wuillot =

Belgian tennis player

- Country (sports): Belgium
- Born: 2 July 1971 (age 53)
- Prize money: $29,340

Singles
- Career record: 73–79
- Highest ranking: No. 219

Doubles
- Highest ranking: No. 284

Caroline Wuillot (born 2 July 1971) is a Belgian former tennis player.

She has career-high WTA rankings of 219 in singles, achieved on 5 April 1993, and 284 in doubles, reached on 03 September 1990. Her only WTA Tour main-draw appearance came at the 1992 Belgian Open. She defeated Ukrainian Elena Brioukhovets in the first round. She was defeated in the second round by her French opponent, Sybille Niox-Château, in straight sets.

== ITF finals ==
$10,000 tournaments

=== Singles: 3 (1–2) ===
Result	No.	Date	Tournament	Surface	Opponent	Score
Loss	1.	16 February 1992	ITF Swindon, United Kingdom	Carpet (i)	(France) Sarah Pitkowski-Malcor	2–6, 4–6
Win	1.	23 February 1992	ITF Reims, France	Clay	(France) Sarah Pitkowski-Malcor	6–4, 6–1
Loss	2.	13 August 1995	ITF Rebecq, Belgium	Clay	(Belgium) Patty Van Acker	4–6, 6–4, 1–6

=== Doubles: 3 (3–0) ===
Result	No	Date	Tournament	Surface	Partner	Opponents	Score
Win	1.	26 February 1990	ITF Wigan, United Kingdom	Hard (i)	(Belgium) Els Callens	(Sweden) Jenny Thielmann (Netherlands) Claire Wegink	7–5, 6–0
Win	2.	11 June 1990	ITF Cascais, Portugal	Clay	(Belgium) Els Callens	(Netherlands) Ingelise Driehuis (Australia) Louise Pleming	2–6, 6–4, 7–6^{(6)}
Win	3.	6 August 1990	ITF Rebecq, Belgium	Clay	(Belgium) Els Callens	(Romania) Ruxandra Dragomir (Romania) Irina Spîrlea	6–4, 6–2
