= Renata Šmekálová =

Former professional tennis player

- Country (sports): Czechoslovakia
- Born: 30 March 1969 (age 56)
- Prize money: $17,366

Singles
- Career record: 46–49
- Career titles: 2 ITF
- Highest ranking: No. 213 (23 Oct 1989)

Doubles
- Career record: 17–42
- Highest ranking: No. 305 (29 Aug 1988)

Renata Šmekálová (born 30 March 1969) is a Slovak former professional tennis player.

While competing on the professional tour, Šmekálová had a career high singles ranking of 213 in the world and won two ITF titles. In 1989 she featured in the singles main draw of a WTA Tour tournament in Guarujá.

From 1993 to 1994 she played at collegiate level for Southeastern Louisiana University, amassing a 44–3 record in singles. She was the Southeastern and TAAC Female Athlete of the Year in 1994.

== ITF finals ==
=== Singles: 3 (2–1) ===
Outcome	No.	Date	Tournament	Surface	Opponent	Score
Winner	1.	14 August 1988	Koksijde, Belgium	Clay	(Netherlands) Nathalie Van Dierendonck	6–2, 6–4
Runner-up	1.	16 October 1988	Rabac, Yugoslavia	Clay	(Czechoslovakia) Eva Švíglerová	2–6, 1–6
Winner	2.	4 December 1988	Budapest, Hungary	Carpet	(Netherlands) Claire Wegink	6–3, 6–3
