= 1993 Salem Open-Beijing – Singles =

Singles
- 1993 Salem Open-Beijing

Final
- Champion: (United States) Michael Chang
- Runner-up: (Canada) Greg Rusedski
- Score: 7–6^{(7–5)}, 6–7^{(6–8)}, 6–4

Details
- Draw: 32
- Seeds: 8

Events
Singles	Doubles
Salem Open-Beijing	· 1994 →

This was the first edition of the event.

Michael Chang won the title, beating Greg Rusedski 7–6^{(7–5)}, 6–7^{(6–8)}, 6–4 in the final.

== Seeds ==
1. (United States) Michael Chang (champion)
2. (Sweden) Magnus Gustafsson (quarterfinals)
3. (Sweden) Henrik Holm (first round)
4. (United States) Brad Gilbert (semifinals)
5. (Sweden) Mikael Pernfors (first round)
6. (Sweden) Jonas Svensson (quarterfinals)
7. (Sweden) Christian Bergström (quarterfinals)
8. (Australia) Jamie Morgan (second round)

== Draw ==
=== Key ===
- Q = Qualifier
- WC = Wild card
- LL = Lucky loser
- Alt = Alternate
- SE = Special exempt
- PR = Protected ranking
- ITF = ITF entry
- JE = Junior exempt
- w/o = Walkover
- r = Retired
- d = Defaulted
- SR = Special ranking

=== Finals ===
Semifinals
1	(United States) Michael Chang	6	6
(United States) Tommy Ho	2	3
4	(United States) Brad Gilbert	3	4
(Canada) Greg Rusedski	6	6

Final
1	(United States) Michael Chang	7^{7}	6^{6}	6
(Canada) Greg Rusedski	6^{5}	7^{8}	4

=== Top half ===
First round
1	(United States) M Chang	6	7
(Canada) C Pridham	4	5
(Japan) S Matsuoka	6	6
Q	(United States) P Annacone	4	2
WC	(China) J Xia	1	3
(Germany) A Mronz	6	6
(Germany) M Zoecke	3	4
7	(Sweden) C Bergström	6	6
3	(Sweden) H Holm	4	4
(United States) S Bryan	6	6
WC	(United States) C Chang	4	4
(United States) T Ho	6	6
(Sweden) J Björkman	6	6
(United States) R Weiss	3	2
(United States) C Adams	6	6
5	(Sweden) M Pernfors	1	1

Second round
1	(United States) M Chang	6	6^{3}	7
(Japan) S Matsuoka	4	7^{7}	5
(Germany) A Mronz	3	2
7	(Sweden) C Bergström	6	6
(United States) S Bryan	7^{10}	4	1
(United States) T Ho	6^{8}	6	6
(Sweden) J Björkman	3	7^{8}	3
(United States) C Adams	6	6^{6}	6

Quarterfinals
1	(United States) M Chang	7^{8}	6
7	(Sweden) C Bergström	6^{6}	4
(United States) T Ho	7^{7}	7^{9}
(United States) C Adams	6^{5}	6^{7}

Semifinals
1	(United States) M Chang	6	6
(United States) T Ho	2	3

=== Bottom half ===
First round
6	(Sweden) J Svensson	6	6
WC	(China) B Pan	3	2
(United States) K Thorne	6	7^{10}
(United States) D Flach	1	6^{8}
(Australia) P Rafter	2	6	6
(Australia) N Borwick	6	4	3
Q	(Australia) G Doyle	6	4	6^{3}
4	(United States) B Gilbert	4	6	7^{7}
8	(Australia) J Morgan	6	7
(Netherlands) P Haarhuis	3	5
(Canada) G Rusedski	6	6^{3}	7^{8}
Q	(Australia) M Tebbutt	4	7^{7}	7^{6}
Q	(Sweden) L-A Wahlgren	1	6	3
(South Africa) C van Rensburg	6	1	6
(Netherlands) J Eltingh	5	4
2	(Sweden) M Gustafsson	7	6

Second round
6	(Sweden) J Svensson	6	6
(United States) K Thorne	3	4
(Australia) P Rafter	6^{3}	6	2
4	(United States) B Gilbert	7^{7}	4	6
8	(Australia) J Morgan	4	6^{3}
(Canada) G Rusedski	6	7^{7}
(South Africa) C van Rensburg	4	4
2	(Sweden) M Gustafsson	6	6

Quarterfinals
6	(Sweden) J Svensson	6	5	3
4	(United States) B Gilbert	4	7	6
(Canada) G Rusedski	7	4	7^{7}
2	(Sweden) M Gustafsson	5	6	6^{2}

Semifinals
4	(United States) B Gilbert	3	4
(Canada) G Rusedski	6	6
