= Rudolf Šmejkal =

Czechoslovak footballer

Personal information
- Date of birth: 14 January 1915
- Date of death: 8 November 1972 (aged 57)
- Position: Midfielder

International career
Years	Team	Apps	(Gls)
1939	Bohemia and Moravia	1	(0)
1946	Czechoslovakia	1	(0)

Rudolf Šmejkal (14 January 1915 – 8 November 1972) was a footballer who played international football for both Bohemia and Moravia and Czechoslovakia.
