= Zdeněk Šmejkal =

Czech footballer (born 1988)

Personal information
- Date of birth: 21 June 1988 (age 38)
- Place of birth: Český Brod, Czechoslovakia
- Height: 1.78 m (5 ft 10 in)
- Position: Defender

Youth career
- 1993–1997: SK Český Brod

Senior career*
Years	Team	Apps	(Gls)
1997–2007	Sparta Praha B		
2007–2010	Viktoria Plzeň	12	(1)
2009–2010	→ 1. FK Příbram (loan)	34	(5)
2010–2012	FC Baník Ostrava	18	(2)
2012–2013	1. FK Příbram	0	(0)

International career^{‡}
2006–2007	Czech Republic U19	11	(0)
2011	Czech Republic U21	2	(1)
- * Club domestic league appearances and goals as of 22 December 2014 ‡ National team caps and goals as of 22 December 2014

Zdeněk Šmejkal (born 21 June 1988) is a professional Czech football player.

He played for Czech youth national teams at under-19 and under-21 level.
