= Andrea Müller (tennis) =

German tennis player

- Country (sports): West Germany; Germany
- Born: 21 August 1965 (age 59); Donaueschingen, West Germany
- Prize money: $39,512

Singles
- Highest ranking: No. 183 (30 July 1990)

Grand Slam singles results
- Australian Open: Q2 (1993)
- French Open: Q1 (1993)
- Wimbledon: Q1 (1993)

Andrea Müller (born 21 August 1965) is a German former professional tennis player.

Müller, who was born in Donaueschingen, reached a best singles ranking of 183 in the world. After making her WTA Tour main draw debut at the Oslo Open in 1991, Müller qualified for the 1992 Virginia Slims of Florida, where she was beaten in the first round by Alexia Dechaume. In 1993 she featured in the qualifying draws of the Australian Open, French Open and Wimbledon.

== ITF finals ==
$25,000 tournaments
$10,000 tournaments

=== Singles: 3 (0–3) ===
Result	No.	Date	Tournament	Surface	Opponent	Score
Loss	1.	20 March 1989	Marsa, Malta	Hard	(Italy) Caterina Nozzoli	0–6, 6–4, 2–6
Loss	2.	13 November 1989	Telford, United Kingdom	Hard	(Sweden) Jonna Jonerup	6–2, 3–6, 5–7
Loss	3.	22 October 1990	Neumünster, West Germany	Clay	(West Germany) Christina Singer	4–6, 3–6
