= Sabine Lohmann =

German tennis player

- Country (sports): West Germany; Germany
- Born: 13 March 1973 (age 52)
- Prize money: $52,246

Singles
- Highest ranking: No. 184 (20 April 1992)

Doubles
- Career titles: 2 ITF
- Highest ranking: No. 135 (10 February 1992)

Grand Slam doubles results
- Australian Open: 1R (1993)

Sabine Lohmann (born 13 March 1973) is a German former professional tennis player.

Lohmann played on the professional tour in the early 1990s, reaching a best singles ranking of 184 in the world. At the 1993 Australian Open she made the second round of qualifying and also featured in the main draw of the doubles, partnering Veronika Martinek.

== ITF finals ==
$25,000 tournaments
$10,000 tournaments

=== Singles: 2 (0–2) ===
Result	No.	Date	Tournament	Surface	Opponent	Score
Loss	1.	27 August 1990	Khorat, Thailand	Hard	(Netherlands) Esther Markenstein	4–6, 3–6
Loss	2.	15 October 1990	Burgdorf, Switzerland	Carpet	(Belgium) Dominique Monami	7–5, 2–6, 4–6

=== Doubles: 9 (2–7) ===
Result	No.	Date	Tournament	Surface	Partner	Opponents	Score
Loss	1.	22 January 1990	New Braunfels, United States	Hard	(West Germany) Stefanie Rehmke	(France) Mary Pierce (United States) Jennifer Santrock	4–6, 4–6
Loss	2.	3 September 1990	Hat Yai, Thailand	Hard	(West Germany) Ulrike Przysucha	(South Korea) Choi Jin (South Korea) Choi Jeom-sang	6–3, 2–6, 2–6
Loss	3.	10 September 1990	Bangkok, Thailand	Hard	(West Germany) Ulrike Przysucha	(Netherlands) Esmir Hoogendoorn (Netherlands) Claire Wegink	0–6, 1–6
Win	1.	15 October 1990	Burgdorf, Switzerland	Carpet	(Netherlands) Claire Wegink	(Switzerland) Natalie Tschan (Switzerland) Michèle Strebel	4–6, 6–2, 6–4
Win	2.	22 October 1990	Lyss, Switzerland	Clay	(Netherlands) Claire Wegink	(Israel) Ilana Berger (Israel) Rona Mayer	6–1, 7–5
Loss	4.	26 November 1990	Okada, Nigeria	Hard	(Switzerland) Michèle Strebel	(Netherlands) Yvonne Grubben (Netherlands) Heleen van den Berg	2–6, 5–7
Loss	5.	21 October 1991	Ōita, Japan	Hard	(Sweden) Maria Ekstrand	(Mexico) Lupita Novelo (Australia) Kristine Kunce	1–6, 5–7
Loss	6.	13 July 1992	Vigo, Spain	Clay	(United States) Kylie Johnson	(Spain) Janet Souto (Spain) Rosa Bielsa	6–2, 3–6, 5–7
Loss	7.	30 November 1992	Le Havre, France	Clay	(Germany) Angela Kerek	(Romania) Irina Spîrlea (Romania) Ruxandra Dragomir	3–6, 6–7
