= Orawan Thampensri =

Thai tennis player

- Country (sports): Thailand
- Born: 25 May 1970 (age 55)

Singles
- Career record: 16–23
- Highest ranking: No. 424 (17 Sep 1990)

Doubles
- Career record: 20–16
- Highest ranking: No. 304 (17 Sep 1990)
Medal record
Asian Games
Bronze medal – third place	1990 Beijing	Mixed doubles
Southeast Asian Games
Silver medal – second place	1987 Jakarta	Women's team
Silver medal – second place	1989 Kuala Lumpur	Women's team
Bronze medal – third place	1989 Kuala Lumpur	Women's singles
Bronze medal – third place	1989 Kuala Lumpur	Women's doubles

Orawan Thampensri (born 25 May 1970) is a Thai former professional tennis player.

Thampensri, who had a best singles ranking of 424, played Federation Cup tennis for Thailand in 1989 and 1990. She won two rubbers, both in doubles, from five ties.

A four-time Southeast Asian Games medalist, Thampensri represented Thailand at the 1990 Asian Games in Beijing and won a bronze medal in mixed doubles, partnering Vittaya Samrej.

In 1991 she made her only WTA Tour main draw appearances as a local wildcard at the Pattaya Open, losing in the first round to Petra Kamstra. She was also beaten in the first round of the doubles.

== ITF finals ==
=== Singles: 1 (0–1) ===
Result	No.	Date	Tournament	Surface	Opponent	Score
Loss	1.	Mar 1989	ITF Jakarta, Indonesia	Hard	(Indonesia) Suzanna Wibowo	3–6, 6–4, 1–6

=== Doubles: 1 (0–1) ===
Result	No.	Date	Tournament	Surface	Partner	Opponents	Score
Loss	1.	Aug 1990	ITF Chiang Mai, Thailand	Hard	(Hong Kong) Paulette Moreno	(Netherlands) Esmir Hoogendoorn (Netherlands) Claire Wegink	3–6, 6–1, 1–6
