= 1993 Salem Open-Beijing – Doubles =

Doubles
- 1993 Salem Open-Beijing

Final
- Champions: (United States) Paul Annacone (United States) Doug Flach
- Runners-up: (Netherlands) Jacco Eltingh (Netherlands) Paul Haarhuis
- Score: 7–6, 6–3

Events
Singles	Doubles
Salem Open-Beijing	· 1994 →

This was the first edition of the event.

Paul Annacone and Doug Flach won the title, defeating Jacco Eltingh and Paul Haarhuis 7–6, 6–3 in the final.

== Seeds ==
1. (Netherlands) Jacco Eltingh / (Netherlands) Paul Haarhuis (final)
2. (United States) Mark Keil / (South Africa) Christo van Rensburg (semifinals)
3. (Sweden) Jonas Björkman / (Australia) Patrick Rafter (semifinals)
4. (United States) Paul Annacone / (United States) Doug Flach (champions)

== Draw ==
=== Key ===
- Q = Qualifier
- WC = Wild card
- LL = Lucky loser
- Alt = Alternate
- SE = Special exempt
- PR = Protected ranking
- ITF = ITF entry
- JE = Junior exempt
- w/o = Walkover
- r = Retired
- d = Defaulted
- SR = Special ranking

=== Draw ===
First round
1	(Netherlands) J Eltingh (Netherlands) P Haarhuis	6	2	6
(United States) C Chang (United States) M Chang	4	6	4
WC	(China) Guo Jian (China) Y Zhang	1	3
(Australia) M Tebbutt (Germany) M Zoecke	6	6
3	(Sweden) J Björkman (Australia) P Rafter	6	6
(Australia) J Morgan (Australia) S Stolle	4	3
(Australia) N Borwick (United States) K Thorne	6	6
WC	(China) B Pan (China) J Xia	2	4
(Canada) C Pridham (Sweden) L-A Wahlgren	7	7
(Germany) A Mronz (Germany) L Rehmann	5	6
Q	(Sweden) S Svensson (United States) R Weiss	4	3
4	(United States) P Annacone (United States) D Flach	6	6
(Japan) S Matsuoka (Canada) G Rusedski	7	6
(Australia) G Doyle (United States) T Ho	6	4
(Sweden) M Pernfors (Sweden) J Svensson	1	4
2	(United States) M Keil (South Africa) C van Rensburg	6	6

Quarterfinals
1	(Netherlands) J Eltingh (Netherlands) P Haarhuis	6	7
(Australia) M Tebbutt (Germany) M Zoecke	4	6
3	(Sweden) J Björkman (Australia) P Rafter	6	7
(Australia) N Borwick (United States) K Thorne	2	6
(Canada) C Pridham (Sweden) L-A Wahlgren	4	5
4	(United States) P Annacone (United States) D Flach	6	7
(Japan) S Matsuoka (Canada) G Rusedski	6	4	3
2	(United States) M Keil (South Africa) C van Rensburg	4	6	6

Semifinals
1	(Netherlands) J Eltingh (Netherlands) P Haarhuis	6	6
3	(Sweden) J Björkman (Australia) P Rafter	1	4
4	(United States) P Annacone (United States) D Flach	6	6
2	(United States) M Keil (South Africa) C van Rensburg	4	3

Final
1	(Netherlands) J Eltingh (Netherlands) P Haarhuis	6	3
4	(United States) P Annacone (United States) D Flach	7	6
