= Im Sook-ja =

South Korean tennis player (born 1966)

- Country (sports): South Korea
- Born: 1 February 1966 (age 59)

Singles
- Highest ranking: No. 353 (30 July 1990)

Doubles
- Highest ranking: No. 553 (6 August 1990)
Medal record
Asian Games
Bronze medal – third place	1990 Beijing	Women's Team

Im Sook-ja (born 1 February 1966) is a South Korean former professional tennis player.

Im featured in a total of four ties for the South Korea Federation Cup team, three in 1989 and one in 1990. She also represented South Korea in Asian Games competition and won a bronze medal in the team event at the 1990 Beijing Games.

As a professional player she featured in the occasional ITF circuit event and was runner-up at the Fayetteville USTA tournament in 1990. She reached a best singles ranking of 353 in the world.
