= Claire Wegink =

Dutch tennis player

- Country (sports): Netherlands
- Born: 29 September 1967 (age 57)
- Prize money: $107,504

Singles
- Career titles: 0
- Highest ranking: No. 118 (12 July 1993)

Grand Slam singles results
- Wimbledon: 2R (1994)
- US Open: 2R (1993)

Doubles
- Career titles: 9 ITF
- Highest ranking: No. 196 (19 November 1990)

Claire Wegink (born 29 September 1967) is a former professional tennis player from the Netherlands.

== Biography ==
Wegink, who comes from Tiel, began competing on the professional tour in the late 1980s.

She reached her career-high ranking of 118 in the world in 1993, after making the round of 16 at WTA Tour tournaments that year in Barcelona, Birmingham and Rome.

At Grand Slam level, her best performances were second-round appearances at the 1993 US Open and 1994 Wimbledon Championships.

== ITF finals ==
$25,000 tournaments
$10,000 tournaments

=== Singles (0–7) ===
Outcome	No.	Date	Tournament	Surface	Opponent	Score
Runner-up	1.	27 November 1988	ITF Pforzheim, West Germany	Carpet (i)	(West Germany) Andrea Vopat	6–7, 5–7
Runner-up	2.	4 December 1988	ITF Budapest, Hungary	Carpet	(Czechoslovakia) Renata Šmekálová	3–6, 3–6
Runner-up	3.	7 May 1990	ITF Cascais, Portugal	Clay	(Belgium) Els Callens	1–6, 1–6
Runner-up	4.	19 January 1992	ITF Woodlands, United States	Hard	(United States) Stella Sampras	0–6, 3–6
Runner-up	5.	27 January 1992	ITF Midland, United States	Hard (i)	(Canada) Helen Kelesi	6–7^{(2)}, 6–7^{(8)}
Runner-up	6.	17 February 1992	ITF Barcelona, Spain	Clay	(Spain) Eva Bes	6–7, 4–6
Runner-up	7.	26 July 1992	ITF Bilbao, Spain	Clay	(Spain) Virginia Ruano Pascual	5–7, 2–6

=== Doubles (9–3) ===
Outcome	No.	Date	Tournament	Surface	Partner	Opponents	Score
Runner-up	1.	26 February 1990	ITF Wigan, United Kingdom	Hard (i)	(Sweden) Jenny Thielmann	(Belgium) Els Callens (Belgium) Caroline Wuillot	5–7, 0–6
Winner	1.	20 August 1990	Chiang Mai, Thailand	Hard	(Netherlands) Esmir Hoogendoorn	(Hong Kong) Paulette Moreno (Thailand) Orawan Thampensri	6–3, 1–6, 6–1
Winner	2.	27 August 1990	Korat, Thailand	Hard	(Netherlands) Esmir Hoogendoorn	(South Korea) Choi Jin (South Korea) Choi Jeom-sang	7–6^{(2)}, 6–2
Winner	3.	10 September 1990	Bangkok, Thailand	Hard	(Netherlands) Esmir Hoogendoorn	(West Germany) Sabine Lohmann (West Germany) Ulrike Przysucha	6–0, 6–1
Winner	4.	15 October 1990	Burgdorf, Switzerland	Carpet (i)	(West Germany) Sabine Lohmann	(Switzerland) Natalie Tschan (Switzerland) Michèle Strebel	4–6, 6–2, 6–4
Winner	5.	22 October 1990	Lyss, Switzerland	Clay (i)	(West Germany) Sabine Lohmann	(Israel) Ilana Berger (Israel) Rona Mayer	6–1, 7–5
Runner-up	2.	18 February 1991	Croydon, United Kingdom	Carpet (i)	(Netherlands) Dorien Wamelink	(United Kingdom) Sara Gomer (United Kingdom) Valda Lake	3–6, 6–2, 5–7
Winner	6.	21 July 1991	Subiaco, Italy	Clay	(France) Nathalie Ballet	(Sweden) Sofia Hiort (Finland) Marja-Liisa Kuurne	6–2, 6–3
Winner	7.	3 November 1991	Kingston, Jamaica	Hard	(Canada) Jillian Alexander	(Philippines) Jean Lozano (Puerto Rico) Emilie Viqueira	6–3, 6–1
Winner	8.	10 November 1991	Santo Domingo, Dominican Republic	Clay	(Greece) Christina Zachariadou	(Netherlands) Aafje Evers (Netherlands) Yvonne Klompenhouver	6–4, 6–4
Runner-up	3.	19 January 1992	Mission, United States	Hard	(Canada) Jillian Alexander	(United States) Susan Gilchrist (United States) Vickie Paynter	4–6, 2–6
Winner	9.	21 September 1992	ITF Acireale, Italy	Hard	(Australia) Kirrily Sharpe	(Spain) Ana Segura (Spain) Janet Souto	4–6, 6–1, 6–1
