= Limor Zaltz =

Israeli tennis player

- Native name: לימור זלץ
- Country (sports): Israel
- Born: 8 July 1973 (age 53)
- College: University of Miami
- Prize money: $26,666

Singles
- Career titles: 0 WTA / 2 ITF
- Highest ranking: No. 242 (9 August 1993)

Doubles
- Career titles: 0 WTA / 4 ITF
- Highest ranking: No. 245 (10 June 1991)

Limor Zaltz (Hebrew: לימור זלץ; born 8 July 1973) is an Israeli former professional tennis player. She played collegiate tennis at the University of Miami in Coral Gables, Florida.

== Biography ==
A winner of two junior grand slam titles, Zaltz was the girls' doubles champion at the 1990 Australian Open and 1991 Wimbledon Championships.

Zaltz, who comes from Haifa, played on the professional tour until 1993, reaching best rankings of 242 in singles and 245 in doubles. All of her 11 Fed Cup matches for Israel were in doubles.

In the early 1990s she played college tennis for the University of Miami. Her younger sister Rinat, an Israel women's national basketball team representative, played basketball for the university.

== ITF finals ==
$25,000 tournaments
$10,000 tournaments

=== Singles (2-2) ===
Result	No.	Date	Tournament	Surface	Opponent	Score
Win	1.	14 May 1990	Jaffa, Israel	Hard	(Netherlands) Miriam Oremans	7–6, 3–6, 6–2
Win	2.	18 May 1992	Haifa, Israel	Hard	(Israel) Shiri Burstein	6–2, 2–6, 7–5
Loss	1.	7 September 1992	Jerusalem, Israel	Hard	(Israel) Yael Segal	6–7^{(10)}, 6–3, 4–6
Loss	2.	6 June 1993	Cáceres, Spain	Hard	(Spain) Cristina Torrens Valero	3–6, 6–7^{(5)}

=== Doubles (4-6) ===
Result	No.	Date	Tournament	Surface	Partner	Opponents	Score
Loss	1.	30 July 1990	Roanoke, United States	Hard	(Israel) Ilana Berger	(Israel) Dahlia Coriat (Israel) Medi Dadoch	6–2, 4–6, 4–6
Loss	2.	6 August 1990	Lebanon, United States	Hard	(Israel) Ilana Berger	(United States) Kathy Foxworth (United States) Vincenza Procacci	4–6, 1–4 ret.
Win	1.	5 November 1990	Ashkelon, Israel	Clay	(Israel) Ilana Berger	(Germany) Daniella Blanke (Israel) Yael Shavit	6–2, 6–1
Win	2.	12 November 1990	Ashkelon, Israel	Clay	(Israel) Ilana Berger	(Israel) Dahlia Coriat (Israel) Medi Dadoch	4–6, 6–1, 6–1
Win	3.	18 May 1992	Haifa, Israel	Hard	(South Africa) Michelle Anderson	(South Africa) Rikki Gaddie (South Africa) Toni Gaddie	0–6, 6–3, 6–2
Loss	3.	25 May 1992	Ashkelon, Israel	Hard	(South Africa) Michelle Anderson	(Israel) Ilana Berger (Netherlands) Petra Kamstra	2–6, 6–2, 4–6
Win	4.	7 September 1992	Jerusalem, Israel	Hard	(Israel) Yael Segal	(Israel) Yael Beckman (United Kingdom) Caroline Hunt	6–4, 6–4
Loss	4.	17 May 1993	Tortosa, Spain	Clay	(Israel) Tzipora Obziler	(Argentina) Maria Inés Araiz (Argentina) María Fernanda Landa	6–4, 3–6, 4–6
Loss	5.	31 May 1993	Cáceres, Spain	Hard	(Israel) Tzipora Obziler	(United States) Eleni Rossides (Austria) Heidi Sprung	6–0, 2–6, 2–6
Loss	6.	9 August 1993	College Park, United States	Hard	(Israel) Tzipora Obziler	(United States) Susan Gilchrist (United States) Vickie Paynter	2–6, 3–6

== See also ==
- List of Israel Fed Cup team representatives
