= Miki Yokobori =

Japanese tennis player (born 1975)

- Full name: Miki Yokobori Shimada
- Country (sports): Japan
- Born: 13 May 1975 (age 50)
- Prize money: $43,235

Singles
- Career record: 61–82
- Career titles: 2 ITF
- Highest ranking: No. 246 (2 March 1992)

Grand Slam singles results
- Australian Open: Q2 (1993)
- US Open: Q1 (1992)

Doubles
- Career record: 33–53
- Career titles: 2 ITF
- Highest ranking: No. 201 (5 April 1993)

Miki Yokobori Shimada (born 13 May 1975) is a Japanese former professional tennis player. She is married to Thomas Shimada, who played Davis Cup tennis for Japan.

Yokobori competed on the professional tour in the early 1990s and reached a best singles ranking of 246 in the world. She made her WTA Tour main draw debut at the 1992 Pan Pacific Open in Tokyo and appeared in her only other singles main draw in 1994, when she qualified for the China Open. During her career she featured in the qualifying draws for both the Australian Open and US Open.

== ITF finals ==
Legend
$25,000 tournaments
$10,000 tournaments

=== Singles (2–0) ===
Result	No.	Date	Tournament	Surface	Opponent	Score
Win	1.	14 July 1991	Dublin, Ireland	Clay	(Paraguay) Larissa Schaerer	7–5, 6–4
Win	2.	17 July 1994	Toluca, Mexico	Hard	(Mexico) Lucila Becerra	6–4, 2–6, 6–2

=== Doubles (2–0) ===
Result	No.	Date	Tournament	Surface	Partner	Opponents	Score
Win	1	21 June 1992	Milan, Italy	Clay	(Japan) Kyōko Nagatsuka	(Brazil) Luciana Tella (Brazil) Andrea Vieira	3–6, 6–1, 6–3
Win	2	12 July 1992	Ettenheim, Germany	Clay	(China) Chen Li	(Germany) Caroline Schneider (Australia) Angie Woolcock	6–4, 6–2
