= Yael Segal =

Israeli tennis player

- Native name: יעל סגל
- Country (sports): Israel
- Born: 21 July 1972 (age 52)
- Retired: 1993
- Prize money: $67,561

Singles
- Career record: 125–79
- Career titles: 8 ITF
- Highest ranking: No. 159 (7 May 1993)

Doubles
- Career record: 55–49
- Career titles: 2 ITF
- Highest ranking: No. 170 (7 May 1993)

Team competitions
- Fed Cup: 11–15

Yael Segal (Hebrew: יעל סגל; born 21 July 1972) is a former Israeli professional tennis player.

Playing for Israel Fed Cup team, she has a win–loss record of 11–15.

== ITF Circuit finals ==
$100,000 tournaments
$75,000 tournaments
$50,000 tournaments
$25,000 tournaments
$10,000 tournaments

=== Singles (8–2) ===
Result	No.	Date	Tournament	Surface	Opponent	Score
Win	1.	7 November 1988	ITF Haifa, Israel	Hard	(United States) Debbie Spence	6–4, 6–2
Win	2.	27 February 1989	Jaffa, Israel	Hard	(West Germany) Angela Kerek	6–2, 6–1
Loss	3.	30 October 1989	Jerusalem, Israel	Clay	(Netherlands) Miriam Oremans	5–7, 4–6
Win	4.	6 November 1989	Haifa, Israel	Hard	(South Africa) Joannette Kruger	6–0, 6–4
Win	5.	20 November 1989	Tel Aviv, Israel	Hard	(South Africa) Mariaan De Swardt	6–3, 6–3
Win	6.	5 March 1990	Haifa, Israel	Hard	(South Africa) Robyn Field	6–1, 6–1
Loss	7.	29 October 1990	Saga, Japan	Grass	(Australia) Kristine Kunce	3–6, 5–7
Win	8.	7 September 1992	Jerusalem, Israel	Hard	(Israel) Limor Zaltz	7–6^{(10)}, 3–6, 6–4
Win	9.	14 September 1992	Haifa, Israel	Hard	(Israel) Tzipora Obziler	6–3, 6–2
Win	10.	13 June 1993	ITF Ashkelon, Israel	Hard	(Germany) Kirstin Freye	0–6, 7–5, 6–2

=== Doubles (2–8) ===
Result	No.	Date	Tournament	Surface	Partner	Opponents	Score
Loss	1.	7 March 1988	ITF Haifa, Israel	Hard	(Israel) Ilana Berger	(Finland) Anne Aallonen (Sweden) Lena Sandin	1–6, 5–7
Loss	2.	24 October 1988	Ashkelon, Israel	Hard	(Israel) Medi Dadoch	(Israel) Ilana Berger (Israel) Hagit Ohayon	5–7, 0–6
Loss	3.	24 July 1989	Subiaco, Italy	Clay	(Israel) Medi Dadoch	(Soviet Union) Elena Brioukhovets (Soviet Union) Eugenia Maniokova	2–6, 0–6
Loss	4.	6 May 1991	Porto, Portugal	Clay	(South Africa) Mariaan de Swardt	(Spain) Eva Bes (Spain) Virginia Ruano Pascual	3–6, 5–7
Win	5.	7 September 1992	Jerusalem, Israel	Hard	(Israel) Limor Zaltz	(Israel) Yael Beckman (United Kingdom) Caroline Hunt	6–4, 6–4
Win	6.	14 September 1992	Haifa, Israel	Hard	(Belgium) Vanessa Matthys	(Germany) Henrike Kadzidroga (Germany) Claudia Timm	5–7, 6–0, 6–2
Loss	7.	20 April 1992	Ramat HaSharon, Israel	Hard	(Netherlands) Gaby Coorengel	(Netherlands) Carin Bakkum (Netherlands) Ingelise Driehuis	2–6, 1–6
Loss	8.	22 February 1993	Miami, United States	Hard	(United States) Audra Keller	(United States) Elly Hakami (United States) Stephanie Reece	1–6, 0–6
Loss	9.	19 April 1993	Bari, Italy	Clay	(Australia) Kirrily Sharpe	(Belgium) Laurence Courtois (Czech Republic) Eva Martincová	6–2, 4–6, 1–6
Loss	10.	13 June 1993	ITF Ashkelon, Israel	Hard	(Finland) Petra Thorén	(Netherlands) Seda Noorlander (Netherlands) Sandra van der Aa	4–6, 4–6
