= Ilana Berger =

Israeli tennis player

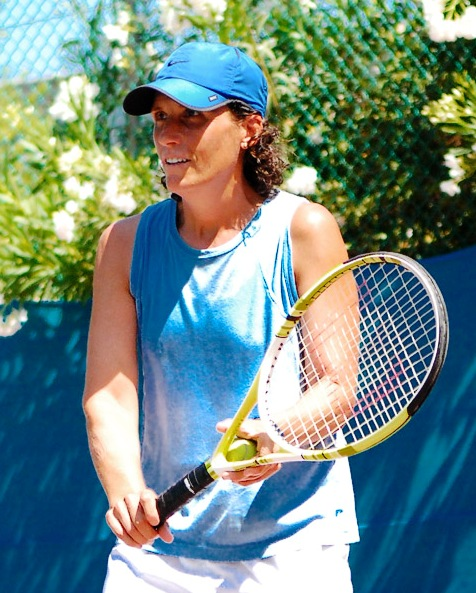
- Native name: אילנה ברגר
- Country (sports): Israel
- Residence: Herzliya, Israel
- Born: December 31, 1965 (age 59) Mexico City, Mexico
- Plays: Right-handed (two-handed backhand)
- Prize money: $69,934

Singles
- Career record: 145–86
- Career titles: 0 WTA, 8 ITF
- Highest ranking: No. 149 (10 August 1992)

Other tournaments
- Olympic Games: 1R (1988)

Doubles
- Career record: 125–62
- Career titles: 0 WTA, 15 ITF
- Highest ranking: No. 153 (25 November 1991)

Grand Slam doubles results
- Australian Open: 1R (1988, 1992)

Ilana Berger (Hebrew: אילנה ברגר; born 1965) is a Mexican-born Israeli former professional tennis player and Olympian.

Berger reached her highest individual ranking on the WTA Tour on 10 August 1992, when she became # 149 in the world. On 25 November 1991, she peaked at world number 153 in the doubles rankings.

== Biography ==
Berger was born on 31 December 1965, in Mexico City, Mexico. She started playing tennis at the age of 7.

== Tennis career ==
In the late 1980s, after serving for two years in the Israel Defense Forces, Berger became a professional tennis player. She won 7 singles titles in the ITF Women's Circuit.

Berger won 12 Maccabiah Games medals during her career, including gold, a few of them as a "veteran" while playing Mixed Doubles with Shlomo Glickstein. At the 1989 Maccabiah Games she beat American Andrea Berger to win a gold medal in women's singles.

Berger was elected as one of three best tennis players in Israel's history in the celebrations of Israel's first 50 years.

Berger was Israel's Women's National Champion for five years.

Berger competed for Israel at the 1988 Summer Olympics in Seoul.

Berger represented Israel in 26 meetings in the Federation Cup from 1986 to 1992, going 19–21.

In 2010 she was awarded an honorary medal by the Knesset "for her activities in tennis".

== Journalism career ==
At the age of 26, she decided to study literature and journalism. She worked 7 years as a sports correspondent for Haaretz. She coaches tennis privately and is a freelance sports journalist. Today she is chief editor of the internet site of the Tel Aviv University Sports Center.

== ITF Finals ==
=== Singles Finals: 13 (8-5) ===
$100,000 tournaments
$75,000 tournaments
$50,000 tournaments
$25,000 tournaments
$10,000 tournaments

Result	No.	Date	Tournament	Surface	Opponent	Score
Win	1.	10 November 1986	Jerusalem, Israel	Hard	(Netherlands) Yvonne der Kinderen	6–2, 6–4
Win	2.	30 March 1987	Haifa, Israel	Hard	(France) Cécille Calmette	6–2, 6–0
Loss	3.	6 April 1987	Arad, Israel	Hard	(Netherlands) Hester Witvoet	2–6, 1–6
Win	4.	23 November 1987	Jerusalem, Israel	Hard	(Israel) Dalia Koriat	6–3, 6–2
Loss	5.	24 October 1988	Ashkelon, Israel	Hard	(United States) Debbie Spence	3–6, 4–6
Loss	6.	23 April 1990	Ramat HaSharon, Israel	Hard	(South Africa) Robyn Field	3–6, 6–3, 5–7
Win	7.	13 August 1990	Chatham, United States	Hard	(United States) Shannan McCarthy	6–2, 7–6^{(7–4)}
Win	8.	5 November 1990	Ashkelon, Israel	Clay	(Israel) Tzipora Obziler	6–1, 6–3
Win	9.	12 November 1990	Ashkelon, Israel	Clay	(Israel) Dalia Koriat	7–5, 6–1
Loss	10.	22 April 1991	Ramat HaSharon, Israel	Hard	(South Africa) Mariaan de Swardt	3–6, 6–4, 2–6
Win	11.	5 August 1991	Ramat HaSharon, Israel	Hard	(South Africa) Janine Humphreys	6–3, 6–3
Loss	12.	12 August 1991	Ashkelon, Israel	Hard	(South Africa) Tessa Price	6–7^{(7–9)}, 7–6^{(7–2)}, 3–6
Win	13.	19 August 1991	Ashkelon, Israel	Hard	(South Africa) Tessa Price	6–3, 6–7^{(5–7)}, 6–4

=== Doubles Finals: 25 (15-10) ===
Result	No.	Date	Tournament	Surface	Partner	Opponents	Score
Loss	1.	19 May 1986	Jaffa, Israel	Hard	(Israel) Sagit Doron	(South Africa) Laura Bernard (South Africa) Paulette Roux	6–2, 6–7, 2–6
Win	2.	30 March 1987	Arad, Israel	Hard	(Israel) Yael Shavit	(Netherlands) Titia Wilmink (Netherlands) Hester Witvoet	6–3, 6–2
Loss	3.	11 May 1987	Lee-on-Solent, United Kingdom	Clay	(Netherlands) Titia Wilmink	(United Kingdom) Valda Lake (Argentina) Andrea Tiezzi	3–6, 2–6
Win	4.	17 August 1987	Manhasset, United States	Clay	(United States) Jane Thomas	(Netherlands) Brenda Schultz-McCarthy (Netherlands) Marianne van der Torre	6–4, 6–1
Win	5.	23 November 1987	Jerusalem, Israel	Hard	(Israel) Rafeket Benjamini	(Netherlands) Jana Koran (West Germany) Stefanie Rehmke	6–2, 6–1
Loss	6.	7 March 1988	Haifa, Israel	Hard	(Israel) Yael Segal	(Finland) Anne Aallonen (Sweden) Lena Sandin	1–6, 5–7
Win	7.	8 August 1988	Koksijde, Belgium	Clay	(Israel) Anat Varon	(West Germany) Renata Kochta (Israel) Hagit Ohayon	6–2, 1–6, 6–2
Loss	8.	15 August 1988	Rebecq, Belgium	Clay	(Israel) Anat Varon	(Soviet Union) Elena Brioukhovets (Soviet Union) Viktoria Milvidskaia	2–6, 2–6
Win	9.	24 October 1988	Ashkelon, Israel	Hard	(Israel) Hagit Ohayon	(Israel) Medi Dadoch (Israel) Yael Segal	7–5, 6–0
Win	10.	31 October 1988	Haifa, Israel	Hard	(Israel) Hagit Ohayon	(South Africa) Robyn Field (Republic of Ireland) Lesley O'Halloran	6–3, 6–1
Win	11.	7 November 1988	Jaffa, Israel	Hard	(Israel) Hagit Ohayon	(Netherlands) Colette Sely (Brazil) Themis Zambrzycki	6–3, 6–4
Win	12.	15 May 1989	Jaffa, Israel	Hard	(Spain) María José Llorca	(Finland) Anne Aallonen (Brazil) Luciana Tella	6–3, 6–2
Loss	13.	30 July 1990	Roanoke, United States	Hard	(Israel) Limor Zaltz	(Israel) Dalia Koriat (Israel) Medi Dadoch	6–2, 4–6, 4–6
Loss	14.	6 August 1990	Lebanon, United States	Hard	(Israel) Limor Zaltz	(United States) Kathy Foxworth (United States) Vincenza Procacci	4–6, 1–4 RET.
Loss	15.	22 October 1990	Lyss, Switzerland	Clay	(Israel) Rona Mayer	(Germany) Sabine Lohmann (Netherlands) Claire Wegink	1–6, 5–7
Win	16.	5 November 1990	Ashkelon, Israel	Clay	(Israel) Limor Zaltz	(Germany) Daniella Blanke (Israel) Yael Shavit	6–2, 6–1
Win	17.	12 November 1990	Ashkelon, Israel	Clay	(Israel) Limor Zaltz	(Israel) Dalia Koriat (Israel) Medi Dadoch	4–6, 6–1, 6–1
Win	18.	22 April 1991	Ramat HaSharon, Israel	Hard	(United Kingdom) Julie Salmon	(Finland) Anne Aallonen (Netherlands) Simone Schilder	6–4, 6–4
Win	19.	5 August 1991	Ramat HaSharon, Israel	Hard	(South Africa) Robyn Field	(South Africa) Janine Humphreys (Namibia) Elizma Nortje	6–0, 6–1
Win	20.	12 August 1991	Ashkelon, Israel	Hard	(South Africa) Robyn Field	(United States) Kirsten Dreyer (South Africa) Tessa Price	w/o
Loss	21.	19 August 1991	Jerusalem, Israel	Hard	(South Africa) Robyn Field	(United Kingdom) Barbara Griffiths (United Kingdom) Jane Wood	3–6, 7–6, 1–6
Loss	22.	2 September 1991	Arzachena, Italy	Hard	(Australia) Louise Pleming	(Finland) Nanne Dahlman (Czechoslovakia) Jana Pospíšilová	6–3, 3–6, 1–6
Win	23.	11 November 1991	Swindon, United Kingdom	Carpet	(South Africa) Tessa Price	(Belgium) Els Callens (Switzerland) Michèle Strebel	6–2, 7–5
Win	24.	25 May 1992	Ashkelon, Israel	Hard	(Netherlands) Petra Kamstra	(South Africa) Michelle Anderson (Israel) Limor Zaltz	6–2, 2–6, 6–4
Loss	25.	10 October 1994	Burgdorf, Switzerland	Carpet (i)	(Israel) Tzipora Obziler	(Czech Republic) Lenka Cenková (Czech Republic) Adriana Gerši	6–4, 3–6, 4–6

== See also ==
- List of select Jewish tennis players
