= Historical British performances at Wimbledon =

Performances at tennis championships

This article lists the progress of British tennis players at Wimbledon each year. Wimbledon is the home Grand Slam for British players, but in recent years they have not had much success. However, on 7 July 2013 Andy Murray became the first Briton to win the men's competition since Fred Perry in 1936. The last British woman to win the ladies' tournament was Virginia Wade in 1977.

== Men's singles (Open Era) ==
See the article for each year of the Wimbledon Championships (linked in the 'Year' column) for references.

Year^{[d]}	Best British finish	Player	Last opponent	Score in last match
1968	Fourth round	Mark Cox	Rod Laver	9–7, 5–7, 6–2, 6–0
1969	Fourth round	Bobby Wilson	Tom Okker	11–9, 6–4, 6–2
1970	Semi-final	Roger Taylor	Ken Rosewall	6–3, 4–6, 6–3, 6–3
1971	Third round	Gerald Battrick	John Newcombe	6–4, 6–4, 6–4
1972	Third round	John Paish	Alex Metreveli	7–5, 6–3, 3–6, 6–4
1973	Semi-final	Roger Taylor	Jan Kodeš	8–9, 9–7, 5–7, 6–4, 7–5
1974	Third round	Buster Mottram	Dick Stockton	W/O
1975	Fourth round	Graham Stilwell	Arthur Ashe	6–2, 5–7, 6–4, 6–2
1976	Third round	Richard Lewis	Nikola Pilić	3–6, 6–4, 6–3, 6–3
1977	Fourth round	Mark Cox	Billy Martin	3–6, 6–3, 6–4, 0–6, 9–7
1978	Second round	Robin Drysdale	Jaime Fillol	6–3, 6–3, 6–2
1978	Second round	Buster Mottram	Frew McMillan	9–8, 6–4, 6–3
1978	Second round	John Feaver	Guillermo Vilas	6–3, 2–6, 6–4, 6–3
1978	Second round	Mark Cox	Tom Gorman	4–6, 8–6, 8–6, 7–5
1979	Fourth round	Mark Cox	Jimmy Connors	6–2, 6–1, 6–1
1980	Second round	Mark Cox	Ramesh Krishnan	6–7, 7–5, 7–5, 6–1
1980	Second round	Andrew Jarrett	Gene Mayer	6–4, 6–4, 6–1
1980	Second round	Buster Mottram	Nick Saviano	6–7, 7–6, 6–3, 4–6, 13-11
1981	Second round	Buster Mottram	Victor Amaya	6–3, 6–4, 6–2
1981	Second round	John Lloyd	José Luis Clerc	4–6, 6–3, 7–6, 6–4
1981	Second round	John Feaver	Bob Lutz	6–3, 7–5, 6–1
1982	Fourth round	Buster Mottram	Tim Mayotte	6–2, 7–5, 6–3
1983	Second round	Andrew Jarrett	Loïc Courteau	6–2, 7–5, 6–3
1983	Second round	Stuart Bale	Mel Purcell	7–6, 6–4, 6–3
1984	Third round	John Lloyd	Scott Davis	6–4, 6–4, 7–6
1985	Third round	John Lloyd	Henri Leconte	5–7, 6–3, 6–4, 6–4
1986	Second round	Nick Fulwood	Matt Anger	6–2, 6–4, 6–2
1986	Second round	Colin Dowdeswell	Henri Leconte	6–1, 6–4, 6–4
1986	Second round	Stephen Botfield	Wally Masur	6–4, 6–2, 6–2
1986	Second round	Andrew Castle	Mats Wilander	4–6, 7–6, 6–7, 6–4, 6–0
1987	Third round	Jeremy Bates	Slobodan Živojinović	7–6, 7–6, 7–6
1988	Second round	Stephen Botfield	Simon Youl	6–2, 6–3, 6–4
1988	Second round	Jeremy Bates	Robert Seguso	6–7, 6–3, 6–2, 6–4
1989	Third round	Nick Fulwood	Paul Chamberlin	3–6, 7–6, 6–4, 6–2
1990	Second round	Neil Broad	Christian Bergström	4–6, 7–6, 6–2, 6–2
1990	Second round	Jeremy Bates	Derrick Rostagno	6–1, 3–6, 6–4, 6–1
1991	Third round	Nick Brown	Thierry Champion	7–6^{(7–1)}, 1–6, 7–5, 6–3
1992	Fourth round	Jeremy Bates	Guy Forget	6–7^{(12–10)}, 6–4, 3–6, 7–6^{(7–2)}, 6-3
1993	Fourth round	Andrew Foster	Pete Sampras	6–1, 6–2, 7–6^{(8–6)}
1994	Fourth round	Jeremy Bates	Guy Forget	2–6, 6–1, 6–3, 6–1
1995	Fourth round	Greg Rusedski	Pete Sampras	6–4, 6–3, 7–5
1996	Quarter-final	Tim Henman	Todd Martin	7–6^{(7–5)}, 7–6^{(7–2)}, 6-4
1997	Quarter-final	Tim Henman	Michael Stich	6–3, 6–2, 6–4
1997	Quarter-final	Greg Rusedski	Cédric Pioline	6–4, 4–6, 6–4, 6–3
1998	Semi-final	Tim Henman	Pete Sampras	6–3, 4–6, 7–5, 6–3
1999	Semi-final	Tim Henman	Pete Sampras	3–6, 6–4, 6–3, 6–4
2000	Fourth round	Tim Henman	Mark Philippoussis	6–1, 5–7, 6–7^{(11–9)}, 6–3, 6-4
2001	Semi-final	Tim Henman	Goran Ivanišević	7–5, 6–7^{(8–6)}, 0–6, 7–6^{(7–5)}, 6-3
2002	Semi-final	Tim Henman	Lleyton Hewitt	7–5, 6–1, 7–5
2003	Quarter-final	Tim Henman	Sébastien Grosjean	7–6^{(10–8)}, 3–6, 6–3, 6–4
2004	Quarter-final	Tim Henman	Mario Ančić	7–6^{(7–4)}, 6–4, 6-2
2005	Third round	Andy Murray	David Nalbandian	6–7^{(4–7)}, 1–6, 6–0, 6–4, 6–1
2006	Fourth round	Andy Murray	Marcos Baghdatis	6–3, 6–4, 7–6^{(7–2)}
2007	Second round	Tim Henman	Feliciano López	7-6^{(7–3)}, 7-6^{(7–5)}, 3–6, 2–6, 6–1
2008	Quarter-final	Andy Murray	Rafael Nadal	6–3, 6–2, 6–4
2009	Semi-final	Andy Murray	Andy Roddick	6–4, 4–6, 7–6^{(9–7)}, 7-6^{(7–5)}
2010	Semi-final	Andy Murray	Rafael Nadal	6–4, 7–6^{(8–6)}, 6-4
2011	Semi-final	Andy Murray	Rafael Nadal	5–7, 6–2, 6–2, 6–4
2012	Final	Andy Murray	Roger Federer	4–6, 7–5, 6–3, 6–4
2013	Champion	Andy Murray	Novak Djokovic	Won 6–4, 7–5, 6–4
2014	Quarter-final	Andy Murray	Grigor Dimitrov	6–1, 7–6^{(7–4)}, 6-2
2015	Semi-final	Andy Murray	Roger Federer	7–5, 7–5, 6–4
2016	Champion	Andy Murray	Milos Raonic	Won 6–4, 7-6^{(7–3)}, 7-6^{(7–2)}
2017	Quarter-final	Andy Murray	Sam Querrey	6–3, 4–6, 6–7^{(7–4)}, 6–1, 6-1
2018	Third round	Kyle Edmund	Novak Djokovic	4–6, 6–3, 6–2, 6–4
2019	Third round	Dan Evans	João Sousa	4–6, 6–4, 7–5, 4–6, 6–4
2021	Third round	Dan Evans	Sebastian Korda	6–3, 3–6, 6–3, 6–4
2021	Third round	Andy Murray	Denis Shapovalov	6–4, 6–2, 6–2
2021	Third round	Cameron Norrie	Roger Federer	6–4, 6–4, 5–7, 6–4
2022	Semi-final	Cameron Norrie	Novak Djokovic	2–6, 6–3, 6–2, 6–4
2023	Third round	Liam Broady	Denis Shapovalov	4–6, 6–2, 7–5, 7–5
2024	Third round	Cameron Norrie	Alexander Zverev	6-4, 6-4, 7–6^{(17–15)}
2025	Quarter-final	Cameron Norrie	Carlos Alcaraz	6-2, 6-3, 6-3
2026	Semi-final	Arthur Fery	Alexander Zverev	7-6^{(7–0)}, 6-2, 6-4

== Ladies' singles (Open Era) ==
See the article for each year of the Wimbledon Championships (linked in the 'Year' column) for references.

Year^{[d]}	Best British finish	Player	Last opponent	Score in last match
1968	Semi-final	Ann Jones	Billie Jean King	4–6, 7–5, 6–2
1969	Champion	Ann Jones	Billie Jean King	Won 3–6, 6–3, 6–2
1970	Quarter-final	Winnie Shaw	Rosie Casals	6–2, 6–0
1971	Quarter-final	Winnie Shaw	Margaret Court	6–2, 6–1
1972	Quarter-final	Virginia Wade	Billie Jean King	6–1, 3–6, 6–3
1973	Quarter-final	Virginia Wade	Evonne Goolagong	6–3, 6–3
1974	Semi-final	Virginia Wade	Olga Morozova	1–6, 7–5, 6–4
1975	Quarter-final	Virginia Wade	Evonne Goolagong Cawley	5–7, 6–3, 9–7
1976	Semi-final	Virginia Wade	Evonne Goolagong Cawley	6–1, 6–2
1977	Champion	Virginia Wade	Betty Stöve	Won 4–6, 6–3, 6–1
1978	Semi-final	Virginia Wade	Chris Evert	8–6, 6–2
1979	Quarter-final	Virginia Wade	Evonne Goolagong Cawley	6–3, 6–2
1980	Fourth round	Virginia Wade	Andrea Jaeger	6–2, 7–6
1981	Fourth round	Jo Durie	Pam Shriver	6–3, 6–4
1981	Fourth round	Anne Hobbs	Hana Mandlíková	6–3, 6–2
1982	Second round	Anne Hobbs	Lucia Romanov	3–6, 6–1, 7–5
1982	Second round	Virginia Wade	Marjorie Blackwood	7–6, 7–5
1983	Quarter-final	Virginia Wade	Yvonne Vermaak	6–3, 2–6, 6–2
1984	Quarter-final	Jo Durie	Hana Mandlíková	6–1, 6–4
1985	Fourth round	Jo Durie	Barbara Potter	7–6, 6–7, 6–1
1986	Third round	Jo Durie	Dianne Balestrat	5–7, 6–3, 6–2
1986	Third round	Anne Hobbs	Robin White	6–4, 6–2
1987	Third round	Jo Durie	Helena Suková	6–1, 6–3
1988	Third round	Julie Salmon	Larisa Savchenko	6–1, 6–2
1989	Third round	Anne Hobbs	Chris Evert	6–4, 6–1
1990	Second round	Sara Gomer	Angélica Gavaldón	7–5, 0–6, 7–5
1990	Second round	Sarah Loosemore	Elna Reinach	6–3, 7–5
1991	Second round	Jo Durie	Manon Bollegraf	6–3, 5–7, 6–3
1991	Second round	Amanda Grunfeld	Martina Navratilova	6–3, 6–1
1992	Second round	Shirli-Ann Siddall	Claudia Porwik	6–4, 6–2
1992	Second round	Amanda Grunfeld	Mana Endo	5–7, 6–2, 7–5
1993	Second round	Clare Wood	Steffi Graf	6–2, 6–1
1993	Second round	Amanda Wainwright	Gloria Pizzichini	6–4, 7–6
1993	Second round	Monique Javer	Nathalie Tauziat	6–1, 6–2
1994	Second round	Shirli-Ann Siddall	Kimiko Date	6–2, 6–0
1995	Second round	Jo Durie	Jana Novotná	6–2, 6–2
1996	Second round	Rachel Viollet	Martina Hingis	6–1, 6–1
1996	Second round	Claire Taylor	Mary Pierce	6–4, 6–2
1997	Third round	Karen Cross	Iva Majoli	4–6, 7–6, 6–4
1998	Fourth round	Samantha Smith	Nathalie Tauziat	6–3, 6–1
1999	Second round	Louise Latimer	Sarah Pitkowski	7–5, 5–7, 6–3
1999	Second round	Karen Cross	Kim Clijsters	6–2, 6–0
2000	Second round	Louise Latimer	Anke Huber	5–7, 6–3, 6–3
2000	Second round	Lucie Ahl	Sandra Načuk	6-4, 6-3
2001	Second round	Karen Cross	Lisa Raymond	6–0, 6–1
2002	Third round	Elena Baltacha	Elena Likhovtseva	6–4, 7–6^{(7–2)}
2003	First round	Julie Pullin	Lina Krasnoroutskaya	6–3, 6–1
2003	First round	Jane O'Donoghue	Marlene Weingärtner	6-4, 6-2
2003	First round	Elena Baltacha	Jelena Dokic	6-3, 1-6, 6-4
2003	First round	Anne Keothavong	Katarina Srebotnik	6-2, 4-0 ret
2003	First round	Lucie Ahl	Ai Sugiyama	3-6, 6-4, 6-4
2004	Second round	Jane O'Donoghue	Magüi Serna	6–3, 6–3
2004	Second round	Elena Baltacha	Jennifer Capriati	6-4, 6-4
2004	Second round	Anne Keothavong	Maria Sharapova	6-4, 6-0
2004	Second round	Emily Webley-Smith	Amy Frazier	6-2, 3-6, 8-6
2005	Second round	Jane O'Donoghue	Nathalie Dechy	6–2, 6–1
2006	Second round	Sarah Borwell	Ana Ivanovic	6–1, 6–2
2006	Second round	Melanie South	Shenay Perry	7-6^{(7-5)}, 6-2
2007	Second round	Katie O'Brien	Michaëlla Krajicek	6–0, 6–1
2008	Second round	Elena Baltacha	Jie Zheng	6–2, 7–5
2008	Second round	Anne Keothavong	Venus Williams	7–5, 6–2
2009	Second round	Elena Baltacha	Kirsten Flipkens	7–5, 6–1
2010	First round	Anne Keothavong	Anastasia Rodionova	3–6, 6–2, 6–4
2010	First round	Heather Watson	Romina Oprandi	6-4, 1-6, 6-3
2010	First round	Katie O'Brien	Alona Bondarenko	6-3, 6-7^{(10-12)}, 6-4
2010	First round	Laura Robson	Jelena Janković	6-3, 7-6^{(7-5)}
2010	First round	Melanie South	Regina Kulikova	6-1, 6-2
2010	First round	Elena Baltacha	Petra Martić	2-6, 7-5, 6-3
2011	Second round	Elena Baltacha	Peng Shuai	4–6, 6–2, 7–5
2011	Second round	Laura Robson	Maria Sharapova	7–6^{(7–4)}, 6-3
2011	Second round	Anne Keothavong	Petra Kvitová	6–2, 6–1
2012	Third round	Heather Watson	Agnieszka Radwańska	6–0, 6–2
2013	Fourth round	Laura Robson	Kaia Kanepi	7–6^{(8–6)}, 7-5
2014	Second round	Heather Watson	Angelique Kerber	6–2, 5–7, 6–1
2014	Second round	Naomi Broady	Caroline Wozniacki	6–3, 6–2
2015	Third round	Heather Watson	Serena Williams	6–2, 4–6, 7–5
2016	Second round	Tara Moore	Svetlana Kuznetsova	6–1, 2–6, 6–3
2016	Second round	Johanna Konta	Eugenie Bouchard	6–3, 1–6, 6–1
2017	Semi-final	Johanna Konta	Venus Williams	6–4, 6–2
2018	Second round	Johanna Konta	Dominika Cibulková	6–3, 6–4
2018	Second round	Katie Boulter	Naomi Osaka	6–3, 6–4
2018	Second round	Katie Swan	Mihaela Buzărnescu	6–0, 6–3
2019	Quarter-final	Johanna Konta	Barbora Strýcová	7–6^{(7–5)}, 6-1
2021	Fourth round	Emma Raducanu	Ajla Tomljanović	6–4, 3-0 ret
2022	Fourth round	Heather Watson	Jule Niemeier	6–2, 6-4
2023	Third round	Katie Boulter	Elena Rybakina	6–1, 6-1
2024	Fourth round	Emma Raducanu	Lulu Sun	6-2, 5-7, 6-2
2025	Fourth round	Sonay Kartal	Anastasia Pavlyuchenkova	7-6^{(7–3)}, 6-4
2026	Second round	Katie Swan	Madison Keys	6-1, 6-4

== See also ==
- List of British singles finalists at Grand Slam tennis tournaments
