= 1996 Direct Line International Championships – Singles qualifying =

This article displays the qualifying draw of the 1996 Direct Line International Championships.

== Players ==
=== Seeds ===
1. (Germany) Karin Kschwendt (qualifying competition, lucky loser)
2. (United States) Annie Miller (qualified)
3. (Federal Republic of Yugoslavia) Tatjana Ječmenica (first round)
4. (Argentina) Inés Gorrochategui (qualified)
5. (Austria) Melanie Schnell (second round)
6. (United States) Tami Whitlinger-Jones (qualifying competition)
7. (United States) Katrina Adams (second round)
8. (United States) Nicole Arendt (qualified)

=== Qualifiers ===
1. (United States) Nicole Arendt
2. (Argentina) Inés Gorrochategui
3. (Belgium) Nancy Feber
4. (United States) Annie Miller

== Qualifying draw ==
=== First qualifier ===
First round
1	(Germany) Karin Kschwendt	6	7
WC	(United Kingdom) Megan Miller	2	6
(Australia) Nicole Pratt	6	2	6
WC	(United Kingdom) Joanne Ward	4	6	4
(Italy) Laura Golarsa	7	4	7
(Spain) Paula Hermida	6	6	5
(Australia) Catherine Barclay	3	1
8	(United States) Nicole Arendt	6	6

Second round
1	(Germany) Karin Kschwendt	0	6	6
(Australia) Nicole Pratt	6	3	3
(Italy) Laura Golarsa	5	4
8	(United States) Nicole Arendt	7	6

Qualifying competition
1	(Germany) Karin Kschwendt	7	6	1
8	(United States) Nicole Arendt	6	7	6

=== Second qualifier ===
First round
4	(Argentina) Inés Gorrochategui	6	6
(Poland) Katarzyna Nowak	0	2
(United States) Debbie Graham	7	3	6
(United Kingdom) Karen Cross	6	6	1
(Madagascar) Dally Randriantefy	4	5
(Australia) Kerry-Anne Guse	6	7
(United States) Kimberly Po	2	1
6	(United States) Tami Whitlinger-Jones	6	6

Second round
4	(Argentina) Inés Gorrochategui	6	7
(United States) Debbie Graham	4	6
(Australia) Kerry-Anne Guse	1	3
6	(United States) Tami Whitlinger-Jones	6	6

Qualifying competition
4	(Argentina) Inés Gorrochategui	6	6
6	(United States) Tami Whitlinger-Jones	4	4

=== Third qualifier ===
First round
7	(United States) Katrina Adams	6	6
(United Kingdom) Samantha Smith	2	0
WC	(United Kingdom) Claire Taylor	6	6	3
(France) Anne-Gaëlle Sidot	7	4	6
WC	(United Kingdom) Rachel Viollet	6	2	1
(United States) Erika deLone	4	6	6
(Belgium) Nancy Feber	6	6
3	(Federal Republic of Yugoslavia) Tatjana Ječmenica	3	2

Second round
7	(United States) Katrina Adams	1	6	4
(France) Anne-Gaëlle Sidot	6	4	6
(United States) Erika deLone	0	5
(Belgium) Nancy Feber	6	7

Qualifying competition
(France) Anne-Gaëlle Sidot	5	3
(Belgium) Nancy Feber	7	6

=== Fourth qualifier ===
First round
5	(Austria) Melanie Schnell	6	3	6
(Australia) Kristin Godridge	3	6	2
(Japan) Rika Hiraki	6	7	2
(Argentina) Mercedes Paz	7	6	6
(South Africa) Tessa Price	4	0
(United States) Meghann Shaughnessy	6	6
(United States) Corina Morariu	6	6	3
2	(United States) Annie Miller	3	7	6

Second round
5	(Austria) Melanie Schnell	4	3
(Argentina) Mercedes Paz	6	6
(United States) Meghann Shaughnessy	0	3
2	(United States) Annie Miller	6	6

Qualifying competition
(Argentina) Mercedes Paz	4	2
2	(United States) Annie Miller	6	6
