= 1995 Direct Line International Championships – Singles =

Singles
- 1995 Direct Line International Championships
- 1994 Champion: (United States) Meredith McGrath

Final
- Champion: (France) Nathalie Tauziat
- Runner-up: (United States) Chanda Rubin
- Score: 3–6, 6–0, 7–5

Details
- Draw: 56
- Seeds: 16

Events
Singles	Doubles
← 1994 ·	Eastbourne International	· 1996 →

Meredith McGrath was the defending champion but did not compete that year.

Nathalie Tauziat won in the final 3–6, 6–0, 7–5 against Chanda Rubin.

== Seeds ==
A champion seed is indicated in bold text while text in italics indicates the round in which that seed was eliminated. The top eight seeds received a bye to the second round.

1. (Japan) Kimiko Date (quarterfinals)
2. (Belarus) Natasha Zvereva (semifinals)
3. (Netherlands) Brenda Schultz-McCarthy (third round)
4. (Czech Republic) Helena Suková (third round)
5. (United States) Gigi Fernández (third round)
6. (United States) Lisa Raymond (third round)
7. (United States) Marianne Werdel-Witmeyer (third round)
8. (Indonesia) Yayuk Basuki (quarterfinals)
9. (United States) Zina Garrison-Jackson (third round)
10. (United States) Lori McNeil (quarterfinals)
11. (France) **Nathalie Tauziat (champion)**
12. (Romania) Irina Spîrlea (first round)
13. (United States) Chanda Rubin (final)
14. (Japan) Mana Endo (third round)
15. (Latvia) Larisa Savchenko (second round)
16. (Netherlands) Miriam Oremans (second round)

== Draw ==
=== Key ===
- Q = Qualifier
- WC = Wild card
- LL = Lucky loser
- Alt = Alternate
- SE = Special exempt
- PR = Protected ranking
- ITF = ITF entry
- JE = Junior exempt
- w/o = Walkover
- r = Retired
- d = Defaulted
- SR = Special ranking

=== Finals ===
Semifinals
13	(United States) **Chanda Rubin**	**6**	**6**
(Germany) Christina Singer	0	0
11	(France) **Nathalie Tauziat**	**6**	**6**
2	(Belarus) Natasha Zvereva	2	4

Final
13	(United States) Chanda Rubin	**6**	0	5
11	(France) **Nathalie Tauziat**	3	**6**	**7**

=== Top half ===
==== Section 1 ====
First round
Q	(United Kingdom) L Jelfs	1	1
(Japan) **N Miyagi**	**6**	**6**
(United States) **P Shriver**	6	**6**	**6**
Q	(France) S Amiach	**7**	3	3
(Italy) **S Farina**	**6**	**7**
12	(Romania) I Spîrlea	2	5
13	(United States) **C Rubin**	**7**	**6**
(Netherlands) K Boogert	6	1
Q	(Italy) **L Golarsa**	**6**	**6**
(Ukraine) N Medvedeva	3	1
(United States) S Stafford	5	2
(United States) **L Harvey-Wild**	**7**	**6**

Second round
1	(Japan) **K Date**	**6**	**6**
(Japan) N Miyagi	2	1
(United States) **P Shriver**	**7**	**6**
(Italy) S Farina	5	1
13	(United States) **C Rubin**	6	**6**	**6**
Q	(Italy) L Golarsa	**7**	4	2
(United States) L Harvey-Wild	5	4
5	(United States) **G Fernández**	**7**	**6**

Third round
1	(Japan) **K Date**	**7**	**6**
(United States) P Shriver	5	2
13	(United States) **C Rubin**	**6**	4	**6**
5	(United States) G Fernández	4	**6**	1

Quarterfinals
1	(Japan) K Date	3	0
13	(United States) **C Rubin**	**6**	**6**

==== Section 2 ====
First round
(South Africa) R Nideffer	5	2
(Germany) **K Kschwendt**	**7**	**6**
LL	(Canada) S Jeyaseelan	2	3
(Germany) **C Singer**	**6**	**6**
LL	(Sweden) M Strandlund	3	0
16	(Netherlands) **M Oremans**	**6**	**6**
9	(United States) **Z Garrison-Jackson**	**6**	**6**
(Germany) W Probst	0	1
(Australia) K Radford	3	6
WC	(United Kingdom) **K Cross**	**6**	**7**
(Belgium) **N Feber**	**6**	**6**
Q	(United Kingdom) M Miller	1	1

Second round
3	(Netherlands) **B Schultz-McCarthy**	**6**	**6**
(Germany) K Kschwendt	4	4
(Germany) **C Singer**	**6**	**6**
16	(Netherlands) M Oremans	2	3
9	(United States) **Z Garrison-Jackson**	**6**	**6**
WC	(United Kingdom) K Cross	2	3
(Belgium) N Feber	3	4
8	(Indonesia) **Y Basuki**	**6**	**6**

Third round
3	(Netherlands) B Schultz-McCarthy	6	3
(Germany) **C Singer**	**7**	**6**
9	(United States) Z Garrison-Jackson	**7**	6	2
8	(Indonesia) **Y Basuki**	5	**7**	**6**

Quarterfinals
(Germany) **C Singer**	**6**	**6**
8	(Indonesia) Y Basuki	4	4

=== Bottom half ===
==== Section 3 ====
First round
Q	(Federal Republic of Yugoslavia) T Ječmenica	1	3
(South Africa) **E Reinach**	**6**	**6**
(Australia) **N Bradtke**	**6**	**6**
WC	(United Kingdom) C Wood	1	4
(Slovenia) T Križan	3	2
11	(France) **N Tauziat**	**6**	**6**
10	(United States) **L McNeil**	4	**6**	**6**
(Australia) R McQuillan	**6**	2	1
(United States) **T Whitlinger-Jones**	**6**	**6**
Q	(France) A Castéra	4	4
(South Korea) **S-H Park**	**6**	**6**
(France) L Ghirardi	2	2

Second round
6	(United States) **L Raymond**	**6**	**6**
(South Africa) E Reinach	1	1
(Australia) N Bradtke	3	**6**	4
11	(France) **N Tauziat**	**6**	4	**6**
10	(United States) **L McNeil**	**6**	**6**
(United States) T Whitlinger-Jones	3	3
(South Korea) S-H Park	2	3
4	(Czech Republic) **H Suková**	**6**	**6**

Third round
6	(United States) L Raymond	3	4
11	(France) **N Tauziat**	**6**	**6**
10	(United States) **L McNeil**	**7**	**6**
4	(Czech Republic) H Suková	5	3

Quarterfinals
11	(France) **N Tauziat**	**6**	**6**
10	(United States) L McNeil	4	2

==== Section 4 ====
First round
(France) **I Demongeot**	**6**	**6**
(Mexico) A Gavaldón	2	4
(Argentina) **I Gorrochategui**	**6**	**6**
(Germany) S Frankl	2	2
Q	(Canada) V Webb	**6**	3	0
15	(Latvia) **L Savchenko**	2	**6**	**6**
14	(Japan) **M Endo**	**6**	2	**6**
Q	(United States) J Steven	2	**6**	1
WC	(United Kingdom) J Durie	**6**	4	5
(United States) **P Fendick**	3	**6**	**7**
(United States) **N Arendt**	5	**7**	**7**
(United States) K Po	**7**	5	5

Second round
7	(United States) **M Werdel-Witmeyer**	**6**	**6**
(France) I Demongeot	1	3
(Argentina) **I Gorrochategui**	**6**	**6**
15	(Latvia) L Savchenko	2	4
14	(Japan) **M Endo**	5	**6**	**6**
(United States) P Fendick	**7**	3	4
(United States) N Arendt	3	2
2	(Belarus) **N Zvereva**	**6**	**6**

Third round
7	(United States) M Werdel-Witmeyer
(Argentina) **I Gorrochategui**	**w/o**
14	(Japan) M Endo	1	4
2	(Belarus) **N Zvereva**	**6**	**6**

Quarterfinals
(Argentina) I Gorrochategui	2	2
2	(Belarus) **N Zvereva**	**6**	**6**
