= 1999 Direct Line International Championships =

- Date: 14 – 19 June
- Edition: 25th
- Category: Tier II
- Draw: 32S / 16D
- Prize money: $520,000
- Surface: Grass
- Location: Eastbourne, United Kingdom
- Venue: Devonshire Park Lawn Tennis Club

Champions

Singles
- (Belarus) Natasha Zvereva

Doubles
- (Switzerland) Martina Hingis / (Russia) Anna Kournikova
| ← 1998 · | Eastbourne International | · 2000 → |

The 1999 Direct Line International Championships was a tennis tournament played on grass courts at the Eastbourne Tennis Centre in Eastbourne in the United Kingdom that was part of Tier II of the 1999 WTA Tour. The tournament was held from 14 June until 19 June 1999. Sixth-seeded Natasha Zvereva won the singles title.

== Finals ==
=== Singles ===
(Belarus) Natasha Zvereva defeated (France) Nathalie Tauziat, 0–6, 7–5, 6–3

- It was Zvereva's only singles title of the year and the fourth of her career.

=== Doubles ===
(Switzerland) Martina Hingis / (Russia) Anna Kournikova defeated (Czech Republic) Jana Novotná / (Belarus) Natasha Zvereva, 6–4 retired

== Entrants ==
=== Seeds ===
| Country | Player | Rank | Seed |
|---|---|---|---|
| USA | Monica Seles | 4 | 1 |
| ESP | Arantxa Sánchez Vicario | 7 | 2 |
| FRA | Nathalie Tauziat | 9 | 3 |
| RSA | Amanda Coetzer | 11 | 4 |
| RUS | Anna Kournikova | 16 | 5 |
| BLR | Natasha Zvereva | 17 | 6 |
| ROU | Irina Spîrlea | 21 | 7 |
| RUS | Elena Likhovtseva | 22 | 8 |

=== Other entrants ===
The following players received wildcards into the singles main draw:

- (United Kingdom) Samantha Smith
- (United Kingdom) Karen Cross

The following players received wildcards into the doubles main draw:

- (United Kingdom) Julie Pullin / (United Kingdom) Lorna Woodroffe

The following players received entry from the singles qualifying draw:

- (United Kingdom) Louise Latimer
- (Ukraine) Elena Tatarkova
- (South Africa) Mariaan de Swardt
- (France) Anne-Gaëlle Sidot

The following players received entry from the doubles qualifying draw:

- (Croatia) Maja Murić / (Greece) Christína Papadáki
