= 1994 Volkswagen Cup – Singles =

Singles
- 1994 Volkswagen Cup
- 1993 Champion: (United States) Martina Navratilova

Final
- Champion: (United States) Meredith McGrath
- Runner-up: (United States) Linda Harvey-Wild
- Score: 6–2, 6–4

Details
- Draw: 56
- Seeds: 16

Events
Singles	Doubles
← 1993 ·	Eastbourne International	· 1995 →

Martina Navratilova was the defending champion but was beaten in the quarterfinals by Meredith McGrath, 6–7, 6–2, 6–4.

McGrath won in the final 6–2, 6–4 against Linda Harvey-Wild.

== Seeds ==
A champion seed is indicated in bold text while text in italics indicates the round in which that seed was eliminated. The top eight seeds received a bye to the second round.

1. (United States) Martina Navratilova (quarterfinals)
2. n/a
3. (Japan) Kimiko Date (second round)
4. (Belarus) Natalia Zvereva (semifinals)
5. (Czech Republic) Helena Suková (third round)
6. (Belgium) Sabine Appelmans (second round)
7. (United States) Lori McNeil (third round)
8. (France) Nathalie Tauziat (third round)
9. (United States) Amy Frazier (first round)
10. (Japan) Naoko Sawamatsu (second round)
11. (Argentina) Inés Gorrochategui (third round)
12. (Netherlands) Brenda Schultz (first round)
13. (United States) Chanda Rubin (first round)
14. (Ukraine) Natalia Medvedeva (first round)
15. (United States) Patty Fendick (third round)
16. (United States) Ginger Helgeson-Nielsen (first round)

== Draw ==
=== Key ===
- Q = Qualifier
- WC = Wild card
- LL = Lucky loser
- Alt = Alternate
- ITF = ITF entry
- PR = Protected ranking
- SR = Special ranking
- SE = Special exempt
- JE = Junior exempt
- JR = Junior Accelerator Programme entrant
- CO = College Accelerator Programme entrant
- NG = Next Gen Accelerator Program entrant
- w/o = Walkover
- r = Retired
- d = Defaulted

=== Finals ===
Semifinals
(United States) **Meredith McGrath**	**6**	**7**
(Indonesia) Yayuk Basuki	0	5
4	(Belarus) Natalia Zvereva	4	5
(United States) **Linda Harvey-Wild**	**6**	**7**

Final
(United States) **Meredith McGrath**	**6**	**6**
(United States) Linda Harvey-Wild	2	4

=== Top half ===
==== Section 1 ====
First round
(Romania) I Spîrlea	**7**	4	3
(Germany) **C Singer**	6	**6**	**6**
Q	(United States) C Benjamin	1	6
(Italy) **L Golarsa**	**6**	**7**
(United States) **G Fernández**	**6**	**6**
12	(Netherlands) B Schultz	2	0
9	(United States) A Frazier	3	3
Q	(Australia) **D Jones**	**6**	**6**
(United States) **M McGrath**	**6**	**6**
Q	(Madagascar) D Randriantefy	3	4
WC	(United Kingdom) **J Pullin**	**6**	2	**6**
(Netherlands) C Vis	3	**6**	3

Second round
1	(United States) **M Navratilova**	**6**	**6**
(Germany) C Singer	3	3
(Italy) **L Golarsa**	**7**	**7**
(United States) G Fernández	6	5
Q	(Australia) D Jones	0	1
(United States) **M McGrath**	**6**	**6**
WC	(United Kingdom) J Pullin	1	**7**	1
8	(France) **N Tauziat**	**6**	5	**6**

Third round
1	(United States) **M Navratilova**	2	**6**	**6**
(Italy) L Golarsa	**6**	1	2
(United States) **M McGrath**	**6**	3	**6**
8	(France) N Tauziat	4	**6**	3

Quarterfinals
1	(United States) M Navratilova	**7**	2	4
(United States) **M McGrath**	6	**6**	**6**

==== Section 2 ====
First round
Q	(United Kingdom) S-A Siddall	2	0
(Italy) **S Farina**	**6**	**6**
Q	(Netherlands) I Driehuis	**6**	5	2
(Netherlands) **M Bollegraf**	3	**7**	**6**
WC	(United Kingdom) J Durie	2	1
15	(United States) **P Fendick**	**6**	**6**
14	(Ukraine) N Medvedeva	2	ret
(South Africa) **E Reinach**	**6**
(Soviet Union) L Savchenko	5	3
(Indonesia) **Y Basuki**	**7**	**6**
(United States) **C Kuhlman**	**6**	3	**6**
(United States) P Shriver	4	**6**	4

Second round
3	(Japan) K Date	**7**	3	8
(Italy) **S Farina**	5	**6**	**10**
(Netherlands) M Bollegraf	**6**	0	3
15	(United States) **P Fendick**	4	**6**	**6**
(South Africa) E Reinach	2	4
(Indonesia) **Y Basuki**	**6**	**6**
(United States) C Kuhlman	3	4
5	(Czech Republic) **H Suková**	**6**	**6**

Third round
(Italy) **S Farina**	**6**	**6**
15	(United States) P Fendick	4	4
(Indonesia) **Y Basuki**	**6**	**7**
5	(Czech Republic) H Suková	2	6

Quarterfinals
(Italy) S Farina	6	**6**	4
(Indonesia) **Y Basuki**	**7**	4	**6**

=== Bottom half ===
==== Section 3 ====
First round
Q	(New Zealand) J Richardson	**7**	2	1
(South Africa) **J Kruger**	6	**6**	**6**
(Australia) **K Radford**	**6**	**6**
(United States) T Austin	3	4
Q	(Croatia) M Murić	6	**7**	2
10	(Japan) **N Sawamatsu**	**7**	6	**6**
11	(Argentina) **I Gorrochategui**	**6**	**6**
(Canada) P Hy	3	3
(Japan) **M Endo**	**6**	**6**
(Kazakhstan) E Likhovtseva	3	4
(United Kingdom) C Wood	2	4
Q	(Ukraine) **E Brioukhovets**	**6**	**6**

Second round
7	(United States) **L McNeil**	**6**	**6**
(South Africa) J Kruger	1	3
(Australia) **K Radford**	5	**6**	**9**
10	(Japan) N Sawamatsu	**7**	0	7
11	(Argentina) **I Gorrochategui**	**6**	**6**
(Japan) M Endo	2	0
Q	(Ukraine) E Brioukhovets	4	2
4	(Belarus) **N Zvereva**	**6**	**6**

Third round
7	(United States) L McNeil	**6**	5	3
(Australia) **K Radford**	1	**7**	**6**
11	(Argentina) I Gorrochategui	3	1
4	(Belarus) **N Zvereva**	**6**	**6**

Quarterfinals
(Australia) K Radford	3	5
4	(Belarus) **N Zvereva**	**6**	**7**

==== Section 4 ====
First round
(United States) K Po	1	1
(United States) **N Arendt**	**6**	**6**
(Australia) R McQuillan	3	5
(United States) **L Raymond**	**6**	**7**
(United States) **M Werdel**	0	**7**	**7**
13	(United States) C Rubin	**6**	5	5
16	(United States) G Helgeson-Nielsen	4	**6**	1
(Netherlands) **M Oremans**	**6**	3	**6**
WC	(United Kingdom) **C Taylor**	**6**	4	**6**
(United States) S Stafford	3	**6**	2
(Sweden) Å Carlsson	3	0
(United States) **L Harvey-Wild**	**6**	**6**

Second round
6	(Belgium) S Appelmans	4	3
(United States) **N Arendt**	**6**	**6**
(United States) **L Raymond**	**6**	**6**
15	(United States) M Werdel	2	0
(Netherlands) **M Oremans**	**6**	**7**
WC	(United Kingdom) C Taylor	0	5
(United States) **L Harvey-Wild**	**6**	**6**
LL	(Netherlands) A Snijders	4	1

Third round
(United States) N Arendt	4	4
(United States) **L Raymond**	**6**	**6**
(Netherlands) M Oremans	3	3
(United States) **L Harvey-Wild**	**6**	**6**

Quarterfinals
(United States) L Raymond	4	**6**	4
(United States) **L Harvey-Wild**	**6**	3	**6**
