= 1995 Direct Line International Championships – Doubles =

Doubles
- 1995 Direct Line International Championships
- 1994 Champions: (United States) Gigi Fernández (Belarus) Natalia Zvereva

Final
- Champions: (Czech Republic) Jana Novotná; (Spain) Arantxa Sánchez Vicario
- Runners-up: (United States) Gigi Fernández; (Belarus) Natasha Zvereva
- Score: 0–6, 6–3, 6–4

Details
- Draw: 28
- Seeds: 8

Events
Singles	Doubles
← 1994 ·	Eastbourne International	· 1996 →

Gigi Fernández and Natasha Zvereva were the defending champions but lost in the final 0–6, 6–3, 6–4 against Jana Novotná and Arantxa Sánchez Vicario.

== Seeds ==
Champion seeds are indicated in bold text while text in italics indicates the round in which those seeds were eliminated. The top four seeded teams received byes into the second round.

1. (Czech Republic) **Jana Novotná** / (Spain) **Arantxa Sánchez Vicario (champions)**
2. (United States) Gigi Fernández / (Belarus) Natasha Zvereva (final)
3. (United States) Meredith McGrath / (Latvia) Larisa Savchenko (semifinals)
4. (United States) Martina Navratilova / (United States) Lisa Raymond (second round)
5. n/a
6. (France) Julie Halard / (France) Nathalie Tauziat (quarterfinals)
7. (United States) Zina Garrison-Jackson / (Argentina) Inés Gorrochategui (quarterfinals)
8. (South Africa) Elna Reinach / (Romania) Irina Spîrlea (semifinals)

== Draw ==
=== Key ===
- Q = Qualifier
- WC = Wild card
- LL = Lucky loser
- Alt = Alternate
- SE = Special exempt
- PR = Protected ranking
- ITF = ITF entry
- JE = Junior exempt
- w/o = Walkover
- r = Retired
- d = Defaulted
- SR = Special ranking

=== Final ===
Final

1
- (Czech Republic) **Jana Novotná**
- (Spain) **Arantxa Sánchez Vicario**
0
**6**
**6**

2
- (United States) Gigi Fernández
- (Belarus) Natasha Zvereva
**6**
3
4

=== Top half ===
First round

Second round

Quarterfinals

Semifinals

1
- (Czech Republic) **J Novotná**
- (Spain) **A Sánchez Vicario**
4
**6**
**6**

- (Italy) **S Farina**
- (Australia) **R McQuillan**
**7**
**6**

- (Italy) S Farina
- (Australia) R McQuillan
**6**
2
1

Q
- (France) A Castéra
- (France) N Dechy
5
3

1
- (Czech Republic) **J Novotná**
- (Spain) **A Sánchez Vicario**
**6**
**6**

- (Russia) E Likhovtseva
- (Ukraine) O Lugina
4
2

5
- (France) J Halard
- (France) N Tauziat
2
3

- (Germany) **K Kschwendt**
- (Germany) **C Singer**
**6**
**6**

- (Germany) K Kschwendt
- (Germany) C Singer
3
4

- (United States) P Fendick
- (Canada) J Hetherington
5
2

5
- (France) **J Halard**
- (France) **N Tauziat**
**6**
**6**

5
- (France) **J Halard**
- (France) **N Tauziat**
**7**
**6**

1
- (Czech Republic) **J Novotná**
- (Spain) **A Sánchez Vicario**
**7**
**6**

8
- (South Africa) E Reinach
- (Romania) I Spîrlea
5
0

4
- (United States) M Navratilova
- (United States) L Raymond
6
3

LL
- (France) I Demongeot
- (South Africa) M Joubert
6
1

- (Australia) **N Bradtke**
- (Australia) **K Radford**
**7**
**6**

- (Australia) **N Bradtke**
- (Australia) **K Radford**
**7**
**6**

- (Australia) N Bradtke
- (Australia) K Radford
4
2

WC
- (United Kingdom) J Durie
- (United Kingdom) C Wood
6
3

8
- (South Africa) **E Reinach**
- (Romania) **I Spîrlea**
**6**
**6**

- (Ukraine) **N Medvedeva**
- (Netherlands) **B Schultz-McCarthy**
**7**
**6**

- (Ukraine) N Medvedeva
- (Netherlands) B Schultz-McCarthy
1
6

- (United States) A Frazier
- (United States) K Po
3
1

8
- (South Africa) **E Reinach**
- (Romania) **I Spîrlea**
**6**
**7**

8
- (South Africa) **E Reinach**
- (Romania) **I Spîrlea**
**6**
**6**

=== Bottom half ===
First round

Second round

Quarterfinals

Semifinals

7
- (United States) **Z Garrison-Jackson**
- (Argentina) **I Gorrochategui**
**6**
4
**6**

- (United States) M Werdel-Witmeyer
- (United States) T Whitlinger-Jones
2
**6**
4

7
- (United States) **Z Garrison-Jackson**
- (Argentina) **I Gorrochategui**
**6**
**6**

- (United States) **L Harvey-Wild**
- (United States) **C Rubin**
**6**
**6**

- (United States) L Harvey-Wild
- (United States) C Rubin
4
3

- (France) S Amiach
- (France) A Fusai
4
2

7
- (United States) Z Garrison-Jackson
- (Argentina) I Gorrochategui
6
1
r

- (Japan) K Nagatsuka
- (Japan) A Sugiyama
0
2

3
- (United States) **M McGrath**
- (Latvia) **L Savchenko**
**7**
**1**

- (Belgium) **S Appelmans**
- (Netherlands) **M Oremans**
**6**
**6**

- (Belgium) S Appelmans
- (Netherlands) M Oremans
6
1

3
- (United States) **M McGrath**
- (Latvia) **L Savchenko**
**7**
**6**

3
- (United States) M McGrath
- (Latvia) L Savchenko
**6**
1
2

LL
- (United Kingdom) J Pullin
- (United Kingdom) L Woodroffe
**6**
3
0

2
- (United States) **G Fernández**
- (Belarus) **N Zvereva**
3
**6**
**6**

- (Belgium) **L Courtois**
- (Belgium) **N Feber**
4
**6**
**6**

- (Belgium) L Courtois
- (Belgium) N Feber
3
2

- (United States) **L McNeil**
- (Czech Republic) **H Suková**
**6**
**6**

- (United States) **L McNeil**
- (Czech Republic) **H Suková**
**6**
**6**

- (Sweden) M Lindström
- (Sweden) M Strandlund
1
2

- (United States) L McNeil
- (Czech Republic) H Suková
4
4

- (Germany) **W Probst**
- (United States) **D Scott**
**6**
5
**6**

2
- (United States) **G Fernández**
- (Belarus) **N Zvereva**
**6**
**6**

Q
- (Netherlands) I Driehuis
- (Australia) L Pleming
3
**7**
4

- (Germany) W Probst
- (United States) D Scott
3
1

2
- (United States) **G Fernández**
- (Belarus) **N Zvereva**
**6**
**6**
