= 1998 Direct Line International Championships – Singles =

Singles
- 1998 Direct Line International Championships

Final
- Champion: (Czech Republic) Jana Novotná
- Runner-up: (Spain) Arantxa Sánchez Vicario
- Score: 6–1, 7–5

Details
- Draw: 28
- Seeds: 8

Events
Singles	Doubles
← 1997 ·	Direct Line International Championships	· 1999 →

Jana Novotná won in the final 6–1, 7–5 against Arantxa Sánchez Vicario. The two had reached the final the previous year but the match was cancelled in the first set due to persistent rain. Two weeks later, Novotná went on to win the Wimbledon title.

== Seeds ==
A champion seed is indicated in bold text while text in italics indicates the round in which that seed was eliminated. The top four seeds received a bye to the second round.

1. (Czech Republic) **Jana Novotná (champion)**
2. (Germany) Steffi Graf (quarterfinals)
3. (Spain) Arantxa Sánchez Vicario (final)
4. (United States) Venus Williams (second round)
5. (Romania) Irina Spîrlea (quarterfinals)
6. (Russia) Anna Kournikova (semifinals)
7. (France) Nathalie Tauziat (first round)
8. (Japan) Ai Sugiyama (second round)

== Draw ==
=== Key ===
- Q = Qualifier
- WC = Wild card
- LL = Lucky loser
- Alt = Alternate
- ITF = ITF entry
- PR = Protected ranking
- SR = Special ranking
- SE = Special exempt
- JE = Junior exempt
- JR = Junior Accelerator Programme entrant
- CO = College Accelerator Programme entrant
- NG = Next Gen Accelerator Program entrant
- w/o = Walkover
- r = Retired
- d = Defaulted

=== Final ===
Final
1	(Czech Republic) **Jana Novotná**	**6**	**7**
3	(Spain) Arantxa Sánchez Vicario	1	5

=== Section 1 ===
First round
Q	(France) **N Dechy**	**6**	**6**
(China) F Li	4	4
(France) S Pitkowski	5	3
Q	(Australia) **K-A Guse**	**7**	**6**
(Italy) R Grande	3	**6**	4
5	(Romania) **I Spîrlea**	**6**	4	**6**
(Venezuela) M Vento	5	3
(Belarus) **N Zvereva**	**7**	**6**
Q	(Russia) T Panova	**7**	3	1
(Spain) **M Serna**	6	**6**	**6**
(Russia) **E Likhovtseva**	**6**	4	**8**
7	(France) N Tauziat	2	**6**	6

Second round
1	(Czech Republic) **J Novotná**	**6**	**6**
Q	(France) N Dechy	2	2
Q	(Australia) K-A Guse	0	5
5	(Romania) **I Spîrlea**	**6**	**7**
4	(United States) V Williams	2	1
(Belarus) **N Zvereva**	**6**	**6**
(Spain) **M Serna**	**6**	**7**
(Russia) E Likhovtseva	4	5

Quarterfinals
1	(Czech Republic) **J Novotná**	**6**	**7**
5	(Romania) I Spîrlea	4	5
(Belarus) **N Zvereva**	**7**	**6**
(Spain) M Serna	6	2

Semifinals
1	(Czech Republic) **J Novotná**	**6**	**6**
(Belarus) N Zvereva	2	1

=== Section 2 ===
First round
8	(Japan) **A Sugiyama**	**6**	**6**
(Poland) M Grzybowska	4	4
(Japan) N Sawamatsu	4	5
WC	(United States) **S Williams**	**6**	**7**
(Thailand) **T Tanasugarn**	**6**	**6**
(United States) A Miller	4	4
6	(Russia) **A Kournikova**	2	**6**	**6**
(France) A Fusai	**6**	1	3
(United States) L Raymond	0	6
Q	(South Africa) **M de Swardt**	**6**	**7**
(Indonesia) Y Basuki	4	3	r
WC	(United Kingdom) **S Smith**	**6**	**3**

Second round
8	(Japan) A Sugiyama	2	5
WC	(United States) **S Williams**	**6**	**7**
(Thailand) T Tanasugarn	2	5
3	(Spain) **A Sánchez Vicario**	**6**	**7**
6	(Russia) **A Kournikova**	**6**	**6**
Q	(South Africa) M de Swardt	4	1
WC	(United Kingdom) S Smith	1	2
2	(Germany) **S Graf**	**6**	**6**

Quarterfinals
WC	(United States) S Williams	**6**	4	4
3	(Spain) **A Sánchez Vicario**	4	**6**	**6**
6	(Russia) **A Kournikova**	6	**6**	**6**
2	(Germany) S Graf	**7**	3	4

Semifinals
3	(Spain) **A Sánchez Vicario**	**w/o**
6	(Russia) A Kournikova
