= 1996 Direct Line International Championships – Singles =

Singles
- 1996 Direct Line International Championships
- 1995 Champion: (France) Nathalie Tauziat

Final
- Champion: (United States) Monica Seles
- Runner-up: (United States) Mary Joe Fernández
- Score: 6–0, 6–2

Events
Singles	Doubles
← 1995 ·	Direct Line International Championships	· 1997 →

Nathalie Tauziat was the defending champion but lost in the semifinals to Monica Seles.

Seles won in the final 6–0, 6–2 against Mary Joe Fernández.

== Seeds ==
A champion seed is indicated in bold text while text in italics indicates the round in which that seed was eliminated. The top four seeds received a bye to the second round.

1. (United States) **Monica Seles (champion)**
2. (Spain) Conchita Martínez (quarterfinals)
3. (Czech Republic) Jana Novotná (semifinals)
4. (United States) Chanda Rubin (second round)
5. (United States) Lindsay Davenport (second round)
6. (United States) Mary Joe Fernández (final)
7. (Japan) Kimiko Date (first round)
8. (France) Mary Pierce (first round)

== Draw ==
=== Key ===
- Q = Qualifier
- WC = Wild card
- LL = Lucky loser
- Alt = Alternate
- SE = Special exempt
- PR = Protected ranking
- ITF = ITF entry
- JE = Junior exempt
- w/o = Walkover
- r = Retired
- d = Defaulted
- SR = Special ranking

=== Final ===
Final
WC/1	(United States) **Monica Seles**	**6**	**6**
6	(United States) Mary Joe Fernández	0	2

=== Section 1 ===
First round
(United States) A Frazier	4	2
(United States) **M McGrath**	**6**	**6**
(Italy) S Farina	3	3
Q	(Argentina) **I Gorrochategui**	**6**	**6**
(United States) **L McNeil**	**6**	2	**6**
7	(Japan) K Date	4	**6**	2
(United States) **L Raymond**	3	**6**	**8**
(Japan) N Sawamatsu	**6**	2	6
(United States) L Wild	1	2
(France) **N Tauziat**	**6**	**6**
(Romania) **I Spîrlea**	**6**	5	**6**
8	(France) M Pierce	0	**7**	2

Second round
WC/1	(United States) **M Seles**	**6**	**6**
(United States) M McGrath	2	4
Q	(Argentina) **I Gorrochategui**	**6**	**6**
(United States) L McNeil	2	3
4	(United States) C Rubin	3	r
(United States) **L Raymond**	**6**
(France) **N Tauziat**	**6**	**6**
(Romania) I Spîrlea	2	3

Quarterfinals
WC/1	(United States) **M Seles**	**6**	**6**
Q	(Argentina) I Gorrochategui	3	1
(United States) L Raymond	2	0
(France) **N Tauziat**	**6**	**6**

Semifinals
WC/1	(United States) **M Seles**	**6**	**6**
(France) N Tauziat	4	4

=== Section 2 ===
First round
5	(United States) **L Davenport**	**6**	**6**
(United States) G Fernández	3	1
Q	(Belgium) N Feber	1	3
(Indonesia) **Y Basuki**	**6**	**6**
LL	(Germany) K Kschwendt	3	3
Q	(United States) **N Arendt**	**6**	**6**
6	(United States) **M J Fernández**	**6**	**6**
(United States) M Werdel-Witmeyer	2	0
WC	(United Kingdom) C Wood	4	3
(Japan) **A Sugiyama**	**6**	**6**
Q	(United States) A Miller	1	6
(Belarus) **N Zvereva**	**6**	**7**

Second round
5	(United States) L Davenport	2	3
(Indonesia) **Y Basuki**	**6**	**6**
Q	(United States) N Arendt	4	**6**	3
3	(Czech Republic) **J Novotná**	**6**	4	**6**
6	(United States) **M J Fernández**	**6**	**6**
(Japan) A Sugiyama	3	3
(Belarus) N Zvereva	6	**6**	3
2	(Spain) **C Martínez**	**7**	4	**6**

Quarterfinals
(Indonesia) Y Basuki	6	1
3	(Czech Republic) **J Novotná**	**7**	**6**
6	(United States) **M J Fernández**	2	**6**	**6**
2	(Spain) C Martínez	**6**	4	4

Semifinals
3	(Czech Republic) J Novotná	1	**6**	6
6	(United States) **M J Fernández**	**6**	2	**8**
