= 1995 Direct Line International Championships =

- Date: 19–25 June
- Edition: 21st
- Category: Tier II
- Draw: 56S / 28D
- Prize money: $430,000
- Surface: Grass / outdoor
- Location: Eastbourne, United Kingdom
- Venue: Devonshire Park Lawn Tennis Club

Champions

Singles
- (France) Nathalie Tauziat

Doubles
- (Czech Republic) Jana Novotná (Spain) Arantxa Sánchez Vicario
← 1994 ·	Eastbourne International	· 1996 →

The 1995 Direct Line International Championships, also known as the Eastbourne International, was a women's tennis tournament played on grass courts at the Devonshire Park Lawn Tennis Club in Eastbourne in the United Kingdom that was part of Tier II of the 1995 WTA Tour. It was the 21t edition of the tournament and was held from 19 June until 25 June 1995. Nathalie Tauziat, who was seeded 11th, won the singles title and earned $79,000 first-prize money.

== Finals ==
=== Singles ===
(France) Nathalie Tauziat defeated (United States) Chanda Rubin 3–6, 6–0, 7–5

- It was Tauziat's only singles title of the year and the third of her career.

=== Doubles ===
(Czech Republic) Jana Novotná / (Spain) Arantxa Sánchez Vicario defeated (United States) Gigi Fernández / (Belarus) Natasha Zvereva 0–6, 6–3, 6–4

- It was Novotná's fifth doubles title of the year and the 55th of her career. It was Sánchez Vicario's fourth doubles title of the year and the 38th of her career.
