= 1997 Direct Line International Championships =

- Date: 17 – 22 June
- Edition: 23rd
- Category: Tier II
- Draw: 32S / 16D
- Prize money: $450,000
- Surface: Grass / outdoor
- Location: Eastbourne, United Kingdom
- Venue: Devonshire Park Lawn Tennis Club

Champions

Singles
- N/A (Note: Both finals were cancelled due to rain.)

Doubles
- N/A
| ← 1996 · | Eastbourne International | · 1998 → |

The 1997 Direct Line International Championships was a women's tennis tournament played on grass courts at the Devonshire Park Lawn Tennis Club in Eastbourne in the United Kingdom that was part of the Tier II category of the 1997 WTA Tour. It was the 23rd edition of the tournament and was held from 17 June until 22 June 1997.

== Finals ==
=== Singles ===
(Spain) Arantxa Sánchez Vicario vs. (Czech Republic) Jana Novotná

=== Doubles ===
(United States) Lori McNeil / (Czech Republic) Helena Suková vs. (United States) Nicole Arendt / (Netherlands) Manon Bollegraf

- Both the singles and doubles finals were cancelled due to rain.
