= 1997 Direct Line International Championships – Doubles =

Doubles
- 1997 Direct Line International Championships
- 1996 Champions: (Czech Republic) Jana Novotná (Spain) Arantxa Sánchez Vicario

Final
- Score: No result due to rain.

Details
- Draw: 16
- Seeds: 4

Events
Singles	Doubles
← 1996 ·	Eastbourne International	· 1998 →

Jana Novotná and Arantxa Sánchez Vicario were the defending champions but they competed with different partners that year, Novotná with Mary Joe Fernández and Sánchez Vicario with Chanda Rubin.

Rubin and Sánchez Vicario lost in the first round to Alexandra Fusai and Nathalie Tauziat.

Fernández and Novotná lost in the quarterfinals to Naoko Kijimuta and Miho Saeki.

There was no result for the tournament due to rain. The final would have seen Lori McNeil and Helena Suková take on Nicole Arendt and Manon Bollegraf.

== Seeds ==
Champion seeds are indicated in bold text while text in italics indicates the round in which those seeds were eliminated.

1. (United States) Gigi Fernández / (Belarus) Natasha Zvereva (semifinals)
2. (United States) Mary Joe Fernández / (Czech Republic) Jana Novotná (quarterfinals)
3. (United States) Lori McNeil / (Czech Republic) Helena Suková (final)
4. (United States) Nicole Arendt / (Netherlands) Manon Bollegraf (final)

== Draw ==
=== Key ===
- Q = Qualifier
- WC = Wild card
- LL = Lucky loser
- Alt = Alternate
- ITF = ITF entry
- PR = Protected ranking
- SR = Special ranking
- SE = Special exempt
- JE = Junior exempt
- JR = Junior Accelerator Programme entrant
- CO = College Accelerator Programme entrant
- NG = Next Gen Accelerator Program entrant
- w/o = Walkover
- r = Retired
- d = Defaulted

First round
1	(United States) **G Fernández** (Belarus) **N Zvereva**	**7**	**6**
(Argentina) I Gorrochategui (Romania) I Spîrlea	5	3
(United States) C Rubin (Spain) A Sánchez Vicario	6	**6**	5
(France) **A Fusai** (France) **N Tauziat**	**7**	3	**7**
3	(United States) **L McNeil** (Czech Republic) **H Suková**	**6**	**6**
(Croatia) I Majoli (Argentina) P Tarabini	3	4
(Australia) **K-A Guse** (Australia) **R McQuillan**	**6**	**6**
(Italy) S Farina (Russia) E Likhovtseva	1	2
(Indonesia) **Y Basuki** (Netherlands) **C Vis**	**6**	**6**
(Italy) R Grande (Japan) R Hiraki	1	1
Q	(United States) G Helgeson-Nielsen (United Kingdom) L Woodroffe	6	**7**	2
4	(United States) **N Arendt** (Netherlands) **M Bollegraf**	**7**	5	**6**
(United States) A Frazier (United States) K Po	5	2
(Japan) **N Kijimuta** (Japan) **M Saeki**	**7**	**6**
WC	(United Kingdom) S Smith (United Kingdom) C Wood	2	3
2	(United States) **M J Fernández** (Czech Republic) **J Novotná**	**6**	**6**

Quarterfinals
1	(United States) **G Fernández** (Belarus) **N Zvereva**	**w/o**
(France) A Fusai (France) N Tauziat
3	(United States) **L McNeil** (Czech Republic) **H Suková**	**6**	3	**6**
(Australia) K-A Guse (Australia) R McQuillan	4	**6**	3
(Indonesia) Y Basuki (Netherlands) C Vis	4	**6**	5
4	(United States) **N Arendt** (Netherlands) **M Bollegraf**	**6**	4	**7**
(Japan) **N Kijimuta** (Japan) **M Saeki**	**w/o**
2	(United States) M J Fernández (Czech Republic) J Novotná

Semifinals
1	(United States) G Fernández (Belarus) N Zvereva
3	(United States) **L McNeil** (Czech Republic) **H Suková**	**w/o**
4	(United States) **N Arendt** (Netherlands) **M Bollegraf**	**6**	**6**
(Japan) N Kijimuta (Japan) M Saeki	2	0

Final
3	(United States) Lori McNeil (Czech Republic) Helena Suková
4	(United States) Nicole Arendt (Netherlands) Manon Bollegraf
