= 1996 Direct Line International Championships – Doubles =

Doubles
- 1996 Direct Line International Championships

Final
- Champions: (Czech Republic) Jana Novotná (Spain) Arantxa Sánchez Vicario
- Runners-up: (South Africa) Rosalyn Nideffer (United States) Pam Shriver
- Score: 4–6, 7–5, 6–4

Details
- Draw: 16
- Seeds: 4

Events
Singles	Doubles
← 1995 ·	Eastbourne International	· 1997 →

Jana Novotná and Arantxa Sánchez Vicario were the defending champions and won in the final 4–6, 7–5, 6–4 against Rosalyn Nideffer and Pam Shriver.

== Seeds ==
Champion seeds are indicated in bold text while text in italics indicates the round in which those seeds were eliminated.

1. (Czech Republic) **Jana Novotná** / (Spain) **Arantxa Sánchez Vicario (champions)**
2. n/a
3. (United States) Katrina Adams / (United States) Meredith McGrath (semifinals)
4. (United States) Nicole Arendt / (Netherlands) Manon Bollegraf (first round)

== Draw ==
=== Key ===
- Q = Qualifier
- WC = Wild card
- LL = Lucky loser
- Alt = Alternate
- SE = Special exempt
- PR = Protected ranking
- ITF = ITF entry
- JE = Junior exempt
- w/o = Walkover
- r = Retired
- d = Defaulted
- SR = Special ranking

First round
1	(Czech Republic) **J Novotná** (Spain) **A Sánchez Vicario**	**6**	**6**
(United States) L McNeil (France) N Tauziat	3	3
WC	(United Kingdom) **S Smith** (United Kingdom) **C Wood**	**7**	**7**
(Germany) K Kschwendt (Japan) A Sugiyama	5	6
3	(United States) **K Adams** (United States) **M McGrath**	**6**	**6**
(Indonesia) Y Basuki (Canada) J Hetherington	4	3
(Belgium) N Feber (Japan) R Hiraki	4	**6**	1
(United States) **L Raymond** (Australia) **R Stubbs**	**6**	4	**6**
(United States) A Lettiere (United States) C Morariu	6	2
(Australia) **E Smylie** (United States) **L Wild**	**7**	**6**
(United States) **A Frazier** (United States) **K Po**	**6**	**6**
4	(United States) N Arendt (Netherlands) M Bollegraf	2	4
(Germany) C Porwik (Romania) I Spîrlea	**6**	3	9
Q	(Federal Republic of Yugoslavia) **T Ječmenica** (Croatia) **M Murić**	3	**6**	**11**
(South Africa) **R Nideffer** (United States) **P Shriver**	**6**	**7**
LL	(United States) M Werdel-Witmeyer (United States) T Whitlinger-Jones	4	5

Quarterfinals
1	(Czech Republic) **J Novotná** (Spain) **A Sánchez Vicario**	**6**	**6**
WC	(United Kingdom) S Smith (United Kingdom) C Wood	1	1
3	(United States) **K Adams** (United States) **M McGrath**	4	**6**	**6**
(United States) L Raymond (Australia) R Stubbs	**6**	2	2
(Australia) **E Smylie** (United States) **L Wild**	4	**6**	**6**
(United States) A Frazier (United States) K Po	**6**	0	3
Q	(Federal Republic of Yugoslavia) T Ječmenica (Croatia) M Murić	**7**	2	6
(South Africa) **R Nideffer** (United States) **P Shriver**	6	**6**	**8**

Semifinals
1	(Czech Republic) **J Novotná** (Spain) **A Sánchez Vicario**	**7**	**7**
3	(United States) K Adams (United States) M McGrath	5	6
(Australia) E Smylie (United States) L Wild	**6**	5	2
(South Africa) **R Nideffer** (United States) **P Shriver**	4	**7**	**6**

Final
1	(Czech Republic) **Jana Novotná** (Spain) **Arantxa Sánchez Vicario**	4	**7**	**6**
(South Africa) Rosalyn Nideffer (United States) Pam Shriver	**6**	5	2
