= List of Great Britain Fed Cup team representatives =

This is a list of tennis players who have represented the Great Britain Fed Cup team in an official Fed Cup match. Great Britain have taken part in the competition since 1963.

== Players ==
Bold represents in the current team for the most recent tie, 2019 Fed Cup Europe/Africa Zone Group I Play-offs. Last updated after the 2019 Fed Cup Europe/Africa Zone Group I Play-offs.

Name	First	Last	Ties	Singles		Doubles		Total		% won	Ref(s)
Name	First	Last	Ties	Won	Lost	Won	Lost	Won	Lost	% won	Ref(s)
Lucie Ahl	2002	2002	3	2	0	1	0	3	0	100.00	
Elena Baltacha	2002	2013	39	19	9	14	7	33	16	67.35	
Sue Barker	1974	1982	27	15	8	16	5	31	13	70.45	
Sarah Borwell	2009	2010	8	0	0	4	3	4	3	57.14	
**Katie Boulter**	2018	2019	7	5	1	2	0	7	1	87.50	
Amanda Brown	1984	1984	4	2	1	2	2	4	3	57.14	
Deidre Catt	1963	1965	5	3	1	3	1	6	2	75.00	
Naomi Cavaday	2007	2007	3	0	3	0	0	0	3	0.00	
Glynis Coles	1974	1980	9	4	2	5	2	9	4	69.23	
Hannah Collin	2000	2000	2	1	1	0	1	1	2	33.33	
Annabel Croft	1985	1986	7	6	1	3	1	9	2	81.82	
Karen Cross	1994	1998	4	1	2	0	1	1	3	25.00	
Claire Curran	2006	2007	8	0	0	6	2	6	2	75.00	
**Harriet Dart**	2019	2020	3	0	2	2	0	2	2	50.00	
Jo Durie	1981	1995	37	12	16	22	6	34	22	73.91	
Sara Gomer	1987	1992	10	6	4	5	0	11	4	73.33	
Amanda Grunfeld	1993	1993	2	0	0	2	0	2	0	100.00	
Anne Hobbs	1978	1989	26	4	5	17	7	21	12	63.64	
Monique Javer	1990	1993	10	7	3	0	0	7	3	70.00	
Ann Jones	1963	1971	18	10	7	11	5	21	12	63.64	
Amanda Keen	2004	2004	3	2	0	0	1	2	1	66.67	
Anne Keothavong	2001	2013	40	21	19	1	3	22	22	50.00	
**Johanna Konta**	2013	2019	24	18	7	2	3	20	10	66.66	
Valda Lake	1996	1996	1	0	0	0	1	0	1	0.00	
Louise Latimer	1998	2001	11	4	5	4	0	8	5	61.54	
Sarah Loosemore	1990	1990	3	2	1	0	0	2	1	66.67	
Tara Moore	2014	2014	2	1	0	0	1	1	1	50.00	
Katie O'Brien	2005	2010	10	3	5	1	3	4	8	33.33	
Jane O'Donoghue	2003	2005	11	1	2	3	5	4	7	36.36	
Julie Pullin	1994	2003	26	5	3	15	7	20	10	66.67	
Jocelyn Rae	2011	2017	13	0	0	10	3	10	3	76.92	
Laura Robson	2012	2017	13	4	2	9	1	13	3	81.25	
Julie Salmon	1988	1993	11	0	0	8	3	8	3	72.73	
Winnie Shaw	1966	1972	19	9	4	6	5	15	9	62.50	
Shirli-Ann Siddall	1995	1995	2	0	2	0	0	0	2	0.00	
Anna Smith	2015	2018	7	0	0	6	1	6	1	85.71	
Samantha Smith	1996	1999	13	9	4	1	1	10	5	66.67	
Melanie South	2008	2009	4	1	0	1	2	2	2	50.00	
Elizabeth Starkie	1966	1966	3	0	0	2	1	2	1	66.67	
**Katie Swan**	2016	2019	5	2	1	2	0	4	1	80.00	
Christine Truman	1963	1968	9	6	3	2	2	8	5	61.54	
Michelle Tyler	1976	1979	5	1	1	1	2	2	3	33.33	
Rachel Viollet	2002	2002	2	1	0	1	0	2	0	100.00	
Virginia Wade	1967	1983	57	36	20	30	13	66	33	66.67	
Joanne Ward	1999	2000	6	3	1	3	0	6	1	85.71	
**Heather Watson**	2011	2020	33	21	9	8	3	29	13	69.05	
Joyce Williams	1969	1973	9	1	2	5	3	6	5	54.55	
Clare Wood	1988	1997	36	18	10	16	8	34	18	65.38	
Lorna Woodroffe	1997	2001	10	0	0	7	3	7	3	70.00	
