= 1999 Direct Line International Championships – Singles =

Singles
- 1999 Direct Line International Championships

Final
- Champion: (Belarus) Natasha Zvereva
- Runner-up: (France) Nathalie Tauziat
- Score: 0–6, 7–5, 6–3

Details
- Draw: 28
- Seeds: 8

Events
Singles	Doubles
- Direct Line International Championships

The 1999 Direct Line International Championships singles was the singles event of the twenty-fifth edition of the Eastbourne International, a WTA Tier II tournament held in Eastbourne, England, United Kingdom and part of the European grass court season. Jana Novotná was the reigning champion but did not participate this year, which was her final year on tour before retiring in the fall.

Natasha Zvereva won in the final 0–6, 7–5, 6–3 against Nathalie Tauziat.

== Seeds ==
The top four seeds received a bye to the second round.

1. (United States) Monica Seles (second round)
2. (Spain) Arantxa Sánchez Vicario (second round)
3. (France) Nathalie Tauziat (final)
4. (South Africa) Amanda Coetzer (semifinals)
5. (Russia) Anna Kournikova (semifinals)
6. (Belarus) Natasha Zvereva (champion)
7. (Romania) Irina Spîrlea (second round)
8. (Russia) Elena Likhovtseva (quarterfinals)

== Draw ==
Key

- Q = Qualifier
- WC = Wild card
- LL = Lucky loser
- Alt = Alternate
- ITF = ITF entry
- PR = Protected ranking
- SR = Special ranking
- SE = Special exempt
- JE = Junior exempt
- JR = Junior Accelerator Programme entrant
- CO = College Accelerator Programme entrant
- NG = Next Gen Accelerator Program entrant
- w/o = Walkover
- r = Retired
- d = Defaulted

=== Finals ===
Semifinals
6	(Belarus) Natasha Zvereva	6^{5}	7^{7}	10
4	(South Africa) Amanda Coetzer	7^{7}	6^{4}	8
3	(France) Nathalie Tauziat	6	4	8
5	(Russia) Anna Kournikova	4	6	6

Final
6	(Belarus) Natasha Zvereva	0	7	6
3	(France) Nathalie Tauziat	6	5	3

=== Top half ===
First round
(Luxembourg) A Kremer	6	6
WC	(United Kingdom) S Smith	4	1
(France) A Fusai	5	3
(Croatia) M Lučić	7	6
(United States) T Snyder	3	3
6	(Belarus) N Zvereva	6	6
Q	(United Kingdom) L Latimer	4	6^{2}
Q	(Ukraine) E Tatarkova	6	7^{7}
Q	(South Africa) M de Swardt	7^{7}	6
Q	(France) A-G Sidot	6^{5}	2
(Israel) A Smashnova	2	6	3
7	(Romania) I Spîrlea	6	3	6

Second round
1	(United States) M Seles	4	4
(Luxembourg) A Kremer	6	6
(Croatia) M Lučić	5	1
6	(Belarus) N Zvereva	7	6
4	(South Africa) A Coetzer	6	6
Q	(Ukraine) E Tatarkova	3	4
Q	(South Africa) M de Swardt	6	6
7	(Romania) I Spîrlea	3	4

Quarterfinals
(Luxembourg) A Kremer	0	1
6	(Belarus) N Zvereva	6	6
4	(South Africa) A Coetzer	7^{7}	6
Q	(South Africa) M de Swardt	6^{3}	3

Semifinals
6	(Belarus) N Zvereva	6^{5}	7^{7}	10
4	(South Africa) A Coetzer	7^{7}	6^{4}	8

=== Bottom half ===
First round
8	(Russia) E Likhovtseva	2	6	6
(United States) C Morariu	6	4	0
LL	(Canada) M Drake	5	1
(Japan) A Sugiyama	7	6
(Austria) S Plischke	6	3	6
WC	(United Kingdom) K Cross	2	6	1
5	(Russia) A Kournikova	6	4	6
(United States) C Rubin	2	6	4
(United States) L Raymond	3	7^{8}	6
(Spain) M Serna	6	6^{6}	4
(France) N Dechy	4	6	6
(United States) A Frazier	6	2	1

Second round
8	(Russia) E Likhovtseva	6	6
(Japan) A Sugiyama	3	4
(Austria) S Plischke	3	3
3	(France) N Tauziat	6	6
5	(Russia) A Kournikova	7^{7}	6
(United States) L Raymond	6^{4}	4
(France) N Dechy	7	6
2	(Spain) A Sánchez Vicario	5	2

Quarterfinals
8	(Russia) E Likhovtseva	6	2	1
3	(France) N Tauziat	0	6	6
5	(Russia) A Kournikova	6	7^{7}
(France) N Dechy	3	6^{5}

Semifinals
3	(France) N Tauziat	6	4	8
5	(Russia) A Kournikova	4	6	6

== Qualifying ==
=== Seeds ===
1. (South Africa) Mariaan de Swardt (qualifier)
2. (Colombia) Fabiola Zuluaga (second round)
3. (France) Anne-Gaëlle Sidot (qualifier)
4. (United States) Kimberly Po (first round)
5. (Canada) Maureen Drake (qualifying competition, lucky loser)
6. (France) Amélie Cocheteux (first round)
7. (Ukraine) Elena Tatarkova (qualifier)
8. (Slovenia) Katarina Srebotnik (qualifying competition)

=== Qualifiers ===
1. (South Africa) Mariaan de Swardt
2. (France) Anne-Gaëlle Sidot
3. (Ukraine) Elena Tatarkova
4. (United Kingdom) Louise Latimer

=== Lucky loser ===
1. (Canada) Maureen Drake

== Qualifying draw ==
Key

- Q = Qualifier
- WC = Wild card
- LL = Lucky loser
- Alt = Alternate
- ITF = ITF entry
- PR = Protected ranking
- SR = Special ranking
- SE = Special exempt
- JE = Junior exempt
- JR = Junior Accelerator Programme entrant
- CO = College Accelerator Programme entrant
- NG = Next Gen Accelerator Program entrant
- w/o = Walkover
- r = Retired
- d = Defaulted

=== First qualifier ===
First round
1	(South Africa) Mariaan de Swardt	6	1	6
(Greece) Christína Papadáki	3	6	2
WC	(United Kingdom) Lucie Ahl	4	6	2
(Italy) Laura Golarsa	6	3	6
(United States) Jane Chi	5
(United States) Nicole Arendt	2^{r}
(Czech Republic) Denisa Chládková	1	4
5	(Canada) Maureen Drake	6	6

Second round
1	(South Africa) Mariaan de Swardt	6	6
(Italy) Laura Golarsa	4	2
(United States) Jane Chi	6	3	4
5	(Canada) Maureen Drake	3	6	6

Qualifying competition
1	(South Africa) Mariaan de Swardt	6	6
5	(Canada) Maureen Drake	1	1

=== Second qualifier ===
First round
3	(France) Anne-Gaëlle Sidot	7	6
(Federal Republic of Yugoslavia) Sandra Naćuk	5	4
(Australia) Nicole Pratt	5	5
(United States) Brie Rippner	7	7
(United States) Jolene Watanabe	3	4
(France) Émilie Loit	6	6
WC	(United Kingdom) Lorna Woodroffe	5	4
8	(Slovenia) Katarina Srebotnik	7	6

Second round
1	(France) Anne-Gaëlle Sidot	6	7^{7}
(United States) Brie Rippner	4	6^{3}
(France) Émilie Loit	6	3	2
8	(Slovenia) Katarina Srebotnik	1	6	6

Qualifying competition
1	(France) Anne-Gaëlle Sidot	4	7^{8}	6
8	(Slovenia) Katarina Srebotnik	6	6^{6}	3

=== Third qualifier ===
First round
7	(Ukraine) Elena Tatarkova	6	6
(Poland) Magdalena Grzybowska	2	2
Alt	(Australia) Rachel McQuillan	7^{9}	7^{7}
(Japan) Miho Saeki	6^{7}	6^{4}
(Thailand) Tamarine Tanasugarn	7	6
(Belgium) Els Callens	5	2
(Canada) Sonya Jeyaseelan	2	7^{7}	9
4	(United States) Kimberly Po	6	6^{4}	7

Second round
7	(Ukraine) Elena Tatarkova	4	6	6
Alt	(Australia) Rachel McQuillan	6	1	1
(Thailand) Tamarine Tanasugarn	6	7^{8}
(Canada) Sonya Jeyaseelan	2	6^{6}

Qualifying competition
7	(Ukraine) Elena Tatarkova	6	6
(Thailand) Tamarine Tanasugarn	4	2

=== Fourth qualifier ===
First round
6	(France) Amélie Cocheteux	4	2
(United Kingdom) Julie Pullin	6	6
Alt	(United States) Katie Schlukebir	5	4
(Chinese Taipei) Janet Lee	7	6
WC	(United Kingdom) Joanne Ward	3	4
WC	(United Kingdom) Louise Latimer	6	6
(United States) Linda Wild	3	4
2	(Colombia) Fabiola Zuluaga	6	6

Second round
(United Kingdom) Julie Pullin	7^{7}	6^{5}	3
(Chinese Taipei) Janet Lee	6^{0}	7^{7}	6
WC	(United Kingdom) Louise Latimer	6	6
2	(Colombia) Fabiola Zuluaga	3	3

Qualifying competition
(Chinese Taipei) Janet Lee	3	2
WC	(United Kingdom) Louise Latimer	6	6
