= 1998 Direct Line International Championships – Doubles =

Doubles
- 1998 Direct Line International Championships

Final
- Champions: (South Africa) Mariaan de Swardt (Czech Republic) Jana Novotná
- Runners-up: (Spain) Arantxa Sánchez Vicario (Belarus) Natasha Zvereva
- Score: 6–1, 6–3

Details
- Draw: 16
- Seeds: 4

Events
Singles	Doubles
← 1997 ·	Eastbourne International	· 1999 →

There was no previous year champions since the tournament was stopped due to heavy rain.

Mariaan de Swardt and Jana Novotná won in the final 6–1, 6–3 against Arantxa Sánchez Vicario and Natasha Zvereva.

== Seeds ==
Champion seeds are indicated in bold text while text in italics indicates the round in which those seeds were eliminated.

1. (Spain) Arantxa Sánchez Vicario / (Belarus) Natasha Zvereva (final)
2. (France) Alexandra Fusai / (France) Nathalie Tauziat (quarterfinals)
3. (Indonesia) Yayuk Basuki / (Netherlands) Caroline Vis (semifinals)
4. (Russia) Anna Kournikova / (Latvia) Larisa Neiland (quarterfinals)

== Draw ==
=== Key ===
- Q = Qualifier
- WC = Wild card
- LL = Lucky loser
- Alt = Alternate
- SE = Special exempt
- PR = Protected ranking
- ITF = ITF entry
- JE = Junior exempt
- w/o = Walkover
- r = Retired
- d = Defaulted
- SR = Special ranking

First round
1	(Spain) **A Sánchez Vicario** (Belarus) **N Zvereva**	**6**	**6**
WC	(United Kingdom) J Pullin (United Kingdom) L Woodroffe	1	2
(Russia) E Likhovtseva (Japan) A Sugiyama	3	1
(South Africa) **N de Villiers** (Australia) **L McShea**	**6**	**6**
3	(Indonesia) **Y Basuki** (Netherlands) **C Vis**	**6**	**6**
Q	(Australia) T Musgrave (United States) K Schlukebir	4	1
(Australia) **K-A Guse** (Australia) **R McQuillan**	**6**	**6**
(Argentina) M Paz (Argentina) P Tarabini	3	3
(Italy) R Grande (United States) G Helgeson-Nielsen	**6**	4	2
(United States) **K Adams** (Netherlands) **M Bollegraf**	4	**6**	**6**
(Argentina) I Gorrochategui (Romania) I Spîrlea	4	4
4	(Russia) **A Kournikova** (Latvia) **L Neiland**	**6**	**6**
(South Africa) **M de Swardt** (Czech Republic) **J Novotná**	**7**	**6**
(Chinese Taipei) J Lee (Australia) N Pratt	6	0
(Japan) N Miyagi (Australia) L Pleming	3	3
2	(France) **A Fusai** (France) **N Tauziat**	**6**	**6**

Quarterfinals
1	(Spain) **A Sánchez Vicario** (Belarus) **N Zvereva**	**6**	**6**
(South Africa) N de Villiers (Australia) L McShea	4	2
3	(Indonesia) **Y Basuki** (Netherlands) **C Vis**	**6**	6	**6**
(Australia) K-A Guse (Australia) R McQuillan	2	**7**	3
(United States) **K Adams** (Netherlands) **M Bollegraf**	**w/o**
4	(Russia) A Kournikova (Latvia) L Neiland
(South Africa) **M de Swardt** (Czech Republic) **J Novotná**	**6**	**7**
2	(France) A Fusai (France) N Tauziat	1	6

Semifinals
1	(Spain) **A Sánchez Vicario** (Belarus) **N Zvereva**	**6**	**6**
3	(Indonesia) Y Basuki (Netherlands) C Vis	4	0
(United States) K Adams (Netherlands) M Bollegraf	0	5
(South Africa) **M de Swardt** (Czech Republic) **J Novotná**	**6**	**7**

Final
1	(Spain) Arantxa Sánchez Vicario (Belarus) Natasha Zvereva	1	3
(South Africa) **Mariaan de Swardt** (Czech Republic) **Jana Novotná**	**6**	**6**
