= 1998 Direct Line International Championships =

- Date: 15 – 20 June
- Edition: 24th
- Category: Tier II
- Draw: 32S / 16D
- Surface: Grass / outdoor
- Location: Eastbourne, United Kingdom
- Venue: Devonshire Park Lawn Tennis Club

Champions

Singles
- (Czech Republic) Jana Novotná

Doubles
- (South Africa) Mariaan de Swardt / (Czech Republic) Jana Novotná
← 1997 ·	Eastbourne International	· 1999 →

The 1998 Direct Line International Championships was a tennis tournament played on grass courts at the Devonshire Park Lawn Tennis Club in Eastbourne in the United Kingdom that was part of Tier II of the 1998 WTA Tour. The tournament was held from 15 June until 20 June 1998. First-seeded Jana Novotná won the singles title.

== Finals ==
=== Singles ===
(Czech Republic) Jana Novotná defeated (Spain) Arantxa Sánchez-Vicario 6–1, 7–5

- It was Novotná's second singles title of the year and the 21st of her career.

=== Doubles ===
(South Africa) Mariaan de Swardt / (Czech Republic) Jana Novotná defeated (Spain) Arantxa Sánchez-Vicario / (Belarus) Natasha Zvereva 6–1, 6–3

- It was de Swardt's only doubles title of the year and the third of her career. It was Novotná's third doubles title of the year and the 71st of her career.
