= 1999 Direct Line International Championships – Doubles =

Doubles
- 1999 Direct Line International Championships

Final
- Champions: (Switzerland) Martina Hingis (Russia) Anna Kournikova
- Runners-up: (Czech Republic) Jana Novotná (Belarus) Natasha Zvereva
- Score: 6–4 retired

Details
- Draw: 16
- Seeds: 4

Events
Singles	Doubles
← 1998 ·	Eastbourne International	· 2000 →

The 1999 Direct Line International Championships doubles was the doubles event of the twenty-fifth edition of the Eastbourne International, a WTA Tier II tennis tournament held in Eastbourne, England and part of the European grass court season. The draw consisted of 16 teams of which four were seeded. Mariaan de Swardt and Jana Novotná were the defending doubles champions but each competed with different partners in 1999. De Swardt partnered Elena Tatarkova and reached the semifinals where they lost to Martina Hingis and Anna Kournikova. Novotná teamed with Natasha Zvereva and they retired in the final to Hingis and Kournikova after losing the first set 4–6.

== Seeds ==
1. (Czech Republic) Jana Novotná / (Belarus) Natasha Zvereva (final)
2. (Switzerland) Martina Hingis / (Russia) Anna Kournikova (champions)
3. (France) Alexandra Fusai / (France) Nathalie Tauziat (first round)
4. (Russia) Elena Likhovtseva / (Japan) Ai Sugiyama (quarterfinals)

== Draw ==
=== Key ===
- Q = Qualifier
- WC = Wild card
- LL = Lucky loser
- Alt = Alternate
- SE = Special exempt
- PR = Protected ranking
- ITF = ITF entry
- JE = Junior exempt
- w/o = Walkover
- r = Retired
- d = Defaulted
- SR = Special ranking

First round
1	(Czech Republic) J Novotná (Belarus) N Zvereva	3	6	6
(United States) D Graham (United States) L McNeil	6	0	1
(United States) K Adams (United States) C Rubin	6	6
(United States) N Arendt (Netherlands) M Bollegraf	4	3
4	(Russia) E Likhovtseva (Japan) A Sugiyama	6	6
(Latvia) L Neiland (Spain) A Sánchez Vicario	1	2
(Australia) R McQuillan (United States) C Morariu	6	4
(Spain) C Martínez (Argentina) P Tarabini	7	6
(South Africa) M de Swardt (Ukraine) E Tatarkova	6	6	6
WC	(United Kingdom) J Pullin (United Kingdom) L Woodroffe	2	7	1
(Australia) K Kunce (United States) K Po	7	6
3	(France) A Fusai (France) N Tauziat	5	3
Q	(Croatia) M Murić (Greece) C Papadáki	2	4
(South Africa) A Coetzer (United States) L Raymond	6	6
(Romania) I Spîrlea (Netherlands) C Vis	6	2
2	(Switzerland) M Hingis (Russia) A Kournikova	7	6

Quarterfinals
1	(Czech Republic) J Novotná (Belarus) N Zvereva	6	6
(United States) K Adams (United States) C Rubin	4	4
4	(Russia) E Likhovtseva (Japan) A Sugiyama	4	4
(Spain) C Martínez (Argentina) P Tarabini	6	6
(South Africa) M de Swardt (Ukraine) E Tatarkova	6	6
(Australia) K Kunce (United States) K Po	4	2
(South Africa) A Coetzer (United States) L Raymond	0	5
2	(Switzerland) M Hingis (Russia) A Kournikova	6	7

Semifinals
1	(Czech Republic) J Novotná (Belarus) N Zvereva	6	6
(Spain) C Martínez (Argentina) P Tarabini	1	4
(South Africa) M de Swardt (Ukraine) E Tatarkova	2	2
2	(Switzerland) M Hingis (Russia) A Kournikova	6	6

Final
1	(Czech Republic) J Novotná (Belarus) N Zvereva	4	r
2	(Switzerland) M Hingis (Russia) A Kournikova	6

== Qualifying ==
=== Seeds ===
1. (Australia) Catherine Barclay / (Australia) Kerry-Anne Guse (first round)
2. (Japan) Miho Saeki / (France) Anne-Gaëlle Sidot (first round)

=== Qualifiers ===
1. (Croatia) Maja Murić / (Greece) Christína Papadáki

== Qualifying draw ==
=== Key ===
- Q = Qualifier
- WC = Wild card
- LL = Lucky loser
- Alt = Alternate
- SE = Special exempt
- PR = Protected ranking
- ITF = ITF entry
- JE = Junior exempt
- w/o = Walkover
- r = Retired
- d = Defaulted
- SR = Special ranking

First round
1	(Australia) Catherine Barclay (Australia) Kerry-Anne Guse	7
(United States) Amy Frazier (United States) Katie Schlukebir	9
(Croatia) Maja Murić (Greece) Christína Papadáki	8
(Italy) Laura Golarsa (Slovenia) Katarina Srebotnik	5
WC	(Croatia) Mirjana Lučić (United Kingdom) Samantha Smith	5
(France) Amélie Cocheteux (France) Émilie Loit	8
(Chinese Taipei) Janet Lee (Thailand) Tamarine Tanasugarn	8
2	(Japan) Miho Saeki (France) Anne-Gaëlle Sidot	2

Second round
(United States) Amy Frazier (United States) Katie Schlukebir	4
(Croatia) Maja Murić (Greece) Christína Papadáki	8
(France) Amélie Cocheteux (France) Émilie Loit	6
(Chinese Taipei) Janet Lee (Thailand) Tamarine Tanasugarn	8

Qualifying competition
(Croatia) Maja Murić (Greece) Christína Papadáki	8
(Chinese Taipei) Janet Lee (Thailand) Tamarine Tanasugarn	4
