= 1997 Direct Line International Championships – Singles =

Singles
- 1997 Direct Line International Championships
- 1996 Champion: (United States) Monica Seles

Final
- Score: No result due to rain.

Details
- Draw: 28
- Seeds: 8

Events
Singles	Doubles
← 1996 ·	Eastbourne International	· 1998 →

Monica Seles was the defending champion but lost in the quarterfinals to Brenda Schultz-McCarthy.

There was no result for the tournament due to rain. The finalists were Arantxa Sánchez Vicario and Jana Novotná, who would also reach the final of the same event a year later (Novotná winning in straight sets).

== Seeds ==
A champion seed is indicated in bold text while text in italics indicates the round in which that seed was eliminated. The top four seeds received a bye to the second round.

1. (United States) Monica Seles (quarterfinals)
2. (Czech Republic) Jana Novotná (final)
3. (Croatia) Iva Majoli (second round)
4. (Spain) Arantxa Sánchez Vicario (final)
5. (United States) Mary Joe Fernández (first round)
6. (Romania) Irina Spîrlea (quarterfinals)
7. (United States) Kimberly Po (second round)
8. (Netherlands) Brenda Schultz-McCarthy (semifinals)

== Draw ==
=== Key ===
- Q = Qualifier
- WC = Wild card
- LL = Lucky loser
- Alt = Alternate
- ITF = ITF entry
- PR = Protected ranking
- SR = Special ranking
- SE = Special exempt
- JE = Junior exempt
- JR = Junior Accelerator Programme entrant
- CO = College Accelerator Programme entrant
- NG = Next Gen Accelerator Program entrant
- w/o = Walkover
- r = Retired
- d = Defaulted

=== Final ===
Final
4	(Spain) Arantxa Sánchez Vicario	cancelled
2	(Czech Republic) Jana Novotná

=== Section 1 ===
First round
Q	(United Kingdom) J Ward	2	5
(Japan) **N Sawamatsu**	**6**	**7**
(United States) L Raymond	5	4
(Italy) **S Farina**	**7**	**6**
(Czech Republic) H Suková	3	6
8	(Netherlands) **B Schultz-McCarthy**	**6**	**7**
(Chinese Taipei) S-T Wang	3	**7**	4
Q	(Australia) **K-A Guse**	**6**	5	**6**
(France) **A-G Sidot**	**6**	**6**
WC	(United Kingdom) L Ahl	3	4
Q	(Argentina) I Gorrochategui	0	**6**	4
6	(Romania) **I Spîrlea**	**6**	3	**6**

Second round
1	(United States) **M Seles**	**6**	**7**
(Japan) N Sawamatsu	2	5
(Italy) S Farina	**6**	1	2
8	(Netherlands) **B Schultz-McCarthy**	4	**6**	**6**
4	(Spain) **A Sánchez Vicario**	**7**	**6**
Q	(Australia) K-A Guse	5	0
(France) A-G Sidot	4	3
6	(Romania) **I Spîrlea**	**6**	**6**

Quarterfinals
1	(United States) M Seles	5	5
8	(Netherlands) **B Schultz-McCarthy**	**7**	**7**
4	(Spain) **A Sánchez Vicario**	**6**	**6**
6	(Romania) I Spîrlea	4	4

Semifinals
8	(Netherlands) B Schultz-McCarthy	5	1
4	(Spain) **A Sánchez Vicario**	**7**	**6**

=== Section 2 ===
First round
5	(United States) M J Fernández	6	5
(France) **N Tauziat**	**7**	**7**
(United States) C Rubin	4	4
Q	(United States) **V Williams**	**6**	**6**
(United States) A Frazier	6	0
(Belarus) **N Zvereva**	**7**	**6**
7	(United States) **K Po**	0	**7**	**6**
(Slovakia) K Studeníková	**6**	6	2
WC	(United Kingdom) S-A Siddall	2	**7**	6
(Japan) **A Sugiyama**	**6**	5	**8**
(Indonesia) **Y Basuki**	**6**	**6**
(Russia) E Likhovtseva	3	0

Second round
(France) **N Tauziat**	**6**	5	**6**
Q	(United States) V Williams	3	**7**	4
(Belarus) **N Zvereva**	**6**	**7**
3	(Croatia) I Majoli	2	5
7	(United States) K Po	3	1
(Japan) **A Sugiyama**	**6**	**6**
(Indonesia) Y Basuki	5	4
2	(Czech Republic) **J Novotná**	**7**	**6**

Quarterfinals
(France) N Tauziat	4	**7**	4
(Belarus) **N Zvereva**	**6**	5	**6**
(Japan) A Sugiyama	2	**7**	4
2	(Czech Republic) **J Novotná**	**6**	6	**6**

Semifinals
(Belarus) N Zvereva	**7**	0	5
2	(Czech Republic) **J Novotná**	6	**6**	**7**
