= Amanda Grunfeld =

British tennis player (born 1967)

- Full name: Amanda Grunfeld Rosenfield
- Country (sports): Great Britain
- Born: 1 March 1967 (age 59) Manchester, England
- Plays: Left-handed
- Prize money: $111,432

Singles
- Highest ranking: No. 138 (28 September 1992)

Grand Slam singles results
- Wimbledon: 2R (1991, 1992)

Doubles
- Highest ranking: No. 148 (25 November 1991)

Grand Slam doubles results
- Australian Open: 1R (1988, 1989)
- Wimbledon: 1R (1989, 1991, 1992, 1993)

Amanda Grunfeld Rosenfield (born 1 March 1967) is a British former professional tennis player.

== Biography ==
=== Tennis career ===
A left-handed player from Manchester, Grunfeld won the British Under-18 Indoor Championship as a 16 year old in 1984.

Her ITF titles include the $25,000 event in her home town of Manchester in 1991, where she beat Irina Spîrlea en route to a win in the final against Samantha Smith.

Grunfeld featured in the singles main draw at Wimbledon on seven occasions, twice reaching the second round. In the 1991 Wimbledon Championships she lost in the second round to Martina Navratilova, after earlier beating Alexia Dechaume-Balleret. At the 1992 tournament she had a win over Silke Meier, then lost a close second round match to Mana Endo, 5–7 in the third set. In addition to her Wimbledon appearances she also played main draw doubles at the Australian Open and featured in qualifying at the French Open and US Open during her career.

She attained her career best ranking of 138 in the world in 1992, which at the time placed her behind only Jo Durie and Monique Javer in the British rankings.

In 1993, her final year on tour, she represented Great Britain in two Federation Cup ties. In both ties she was used as a doubles player alongside Julie Salmon and they won both rubbers, over Ukraine and Turkey.

A shoulder injury ended her tennis career and she left the tour to study for a degree at Manchester University.

=== Personal life ===
Grunfeld, who is Jewish, is married to Peter Rosenfield. She now coaches tennis in Florida, at the Windermere Preparatory School.

== ITF finals ==
Legend
$25,000 tournaments
$10,000 tournaments

=== Singles (3–0) ===
Result	No.	Date	Tournament	Surface	Opponent	Score
Win	1.	10 October 1988	Telford, United Kingdom	Hard (i)	(Sweden) Cecilia Dahlman	6–3, 7–6
Win	2.	26 August 1990	Chiang Mai, Thailand	Hard	(South Korea) Choi Jeom-sang	7–5, 6–4
Win	3.	4 November 1991	Manchester, United Kingdom	Carpet (i)	(United Kingdom) Samantha Smith	4–6, 6–4, 6–2

=== Doubles (2–0) ===
Result	No.	Date	Tournament	Surface	Partner	Opponents	Score
Win	1.	25 April 1988	Sutton, United Kingdom	Clay	(United Kingdom) Jo Louis	(Sweden) Maria Ekstrand (Sweden) Monica Lundqvist	4–6, 7–6, 6–4
Win	2.	10 November 1991	Manchester, United Kingdom	Carpet (i)	(United Kingdom) Julie Salmon	(Bulgaria) Lubomira Bacheva (United Kingdom) Barbara Griffiths	7–6^{(2)}, 6–1

== See also ==
- List of Great Britain Fed Cup team representatives
- List of select Jewish tennis players
