= 1996 Direct Line International Championships =

- Date: 18–22 June
- Edition: 22nd
- Category: Tier II
- Draw: 28S / 16D
- Prize money: $363,000
- Surface: Grass / outdoor
- Location: Eastbourne, United Kingdom
- Venue: Devonshire Park Lawn Tennis Club

Champions

Singles
- (United States) Monica Seles

Doubles
- (Czech Republic) Jana Novotná (Spain) Arantxa Sánchez Vicario
← 1995 ·	Eastbourne International	· 1997 →

The 1996 Direct Line International Championships was a women's tennis tournament played on grass courts at the Devonshire Park Lawn Tennis Club in Eastbourne in the United Kingdom that was part of Tier II of the 1996 WTA Tour. It was the 22nd edition of the tournament and was held from 18 June until 22 June 1996. First-seeded Monica Seles won the singles title.

== Finals ==
=== Singles ===
(United States) Monica Seles defeated (United States) Mary Joe Fernández 6–0, 6–2

- It was Seles' 3rd singles title of the year and the 36th of her career.

=== Doubles ===
(Czech Republic) Jana Novotná / (Spain) Arantxa Sánchez Vicario defeated (South Africa) Rosalyn Nideffer / (United States) Pam Shriver 4–6, 7–5, 6–4

- It was Novotná's 5th doubles title of the year and the 61st of her career. It was Sánchez Vicario's 8th doubles title of the year and the 48th of her career.
