= 1998 Wimbledon Championships – Women's singles =

Women's singles
- 1998 Wimbledon Championships

Final
- Champion: (Czech Republic) Jana Novotná
- Runner-up: (France) Nathalie Tauziat
- Score: 6–4, 7–6^{(7–2)}

Details
- Draw: 128 (8 Q / 8 WC )
- Seeds: 16

Events
Singles	men	women		boys	girls
Doubles	men	women	mixed	boys	girls
WC Singles	men	women	quad
WC Doubles	men	women	quad
Legends	men	women	seniors
← 1997 ·	Wimbledon Championships	· 1999 →

Jana Novotná defeated Nathalie Tauziat in the final, 6–4, 7–6^{(7–2)} to win the ladies' singles tennis title at the 1998 Wimbledon Championships. It was her first and only major singles title, following two previous runner-up finishes at Wimbledon.

Martina Hingis was the defending champion, but lost in the semifinals to Novotná in a rematch of the previous year's final.

The final marked the first time in the Open Era that neither of the Wimbledon finalists had won a major previously, and the first time this scenario had happened at any major since the 1980 Australian Open.

This marked the first Wimbledon singles appearance of future seven-time champion, Olympic gold medalist and world No. 1 Serena Williams; she lost to Virginia Ruano Pascual in the third round.

== Seeds ==
1. (Switzerland) Martina Hingis (semifinals)
2. (United States) Lindsay Davenport (quarterfinals)
3. (Czech Republic) Jana Novotná (champion)
4. (Germany) Steffi Graf (third round)
5. (Spain) Arantxa Sánchez Vicario (quarterfinals)
6. (United States) Monica Seles (quarterfinals)
7. (United States) Venus Williams (quarterfinals)
8. (Spain) Conchita Martínez (third round)
9. (South Africa) Amanda Coetzer (second round)
10. (Romania) Irina Spîrlea (fourth round)
11. (France) Mary Pierce (first round)
12. (Russia) Anna Kournikova (withdrew)
13. (Switzerland) Patty Schnyder (second round)
14. (France) Sandrine Testud (fourth round)
15. (Belgium) Dominique Van Roost (fourth round)
16. (France) Nathalie Tauziat (final)

Click on the seed number of a player to go to their draw section.

Anna Kournikova withdrew due to a thumb injury. She was replaced in the draw by lucky loser Lilia Osterloh.

== Draw ==
=== Key ===
- Q = Qualifier
- WC = Wild card
- LL = Lucky loser
- Alt = Alternate
- ITF = ITF entry
- PR = Protected ranking
- SR = Special ranking
- SE = Special exempt
- JE = Junior exempt
- JR = Junior Accelerator Programme entrant
- CO = College Accelerator Programme entrant
- NG = Next Gen Accelerator Program entrant
- w/o = Walkover
- r = Retired
- d = Defaulted

=== Finals ===
Quarterfinals
1	(Switzerland) Martina Hingis	6	3	6
5	(Spain) Arantxa Sánchez Vicario	3	6	3
3	(Czech Republic) Jana Novotná	7	7^{7}
7	(United States) Venus Williams	5	6^{2}
6	(United States) Monica Seles	6^{4}	2
(Belarus) Natasha Zvereva	7^{7}	6
16	(France) Nathalie Tauziat	6	6
2	(United States) Lindsay Davenport	3	3

Semifinals
1	(Switzerland) Martina Hingis	4	4
3	(Czech Republic) Jana Novotná	6	6
(Belarus) Natasha Zvereva	6	6^{1}	3
16	(France) Nathalie Tauziat	1	7^{7}	6

Final
3	(Czech Republic) Jana Novotná	6	7^{7}
16	(France) Nathalie Tauziat	4	6^{2}

=== Top half ===
==== Section 1 ====
First round
1	(Switzerland) M Hingis	7	6
(United States) L Raymond	5	3
(Russia) E Makarova	6	6
Q	(Croatia) S Talaja	4	2
(Italy) F Perfetti	6	6
(Czech Republic) D Chládková	0	1
(Japan) Y Yoshida	6^{6}	2
(Russia) E Likhovtseva	7^{8}	6
WC	(United Kingdom) K Cross	6	6
WC	(United Kingdom) J Ward	3	4
(Thailand) T Tanasugarn	6	7
(Czech Republic) K Hrdličková	0	5
Q	(Zimbabwe) C Black	6	6
(Canada) S Jeyaseelan	2	4
(Czech Republic) H Suková	6	4	3
13	(Switzerland) P Schnyder	3	6	6

Second round
1	(Switzerland) M Hingis	7^{7}	6
(Russia) E Makarova	6^{2}	4
(Italy) F Perfetti	4	0
(Russia) E Likhovtseva	6	6
WC	(United Kingdom) K Cross	2	5
(Thailand) T Tanasugarn	6	7
Q	(Zimbabwe) C Black	6^{3}	7	6
13	(Switzerland) P Schnyder	7^{7}	5	3

Third round
1	(Switzerland) M Hingis	6	6
(Russia) E Likhovtseva	2	1
(Thailand) T Tanasugarn	6	6
Q	(Zimbabwe) C Black	4	0

Fourth round
1	(Switzerland) M Hingis	6	6
(Thailand) T Tanasugarn	3	2

==== Section 2 ====
First round
15	(Belgium) D Van Roost	6	6
(South Africa) J Kruger	1	3
(France) N Dechy	6^{3}	2
(United States) A Miller	7^{7}	6
WC	(United Kingdom) L Latimer	6	6
(Germany) J Kandarr	4	1
(Belgium) S Appelmans	6	6
(Spain) C Torrens Valero	3	3
(Chinese Taipei) J Lee	6	6
WC	(United Kingdom) L Woodroffe	4	1
(Japan) A Sugiyama	4	7^{7}	3
(Austria) S Plischke	6	6^{2}	6
(Poland) M Grzybowska	6	6
(Romania) R Dragomir	2	4
(Romania) C Cristea	7	2	0
5	(Spain) A Sánchez Vicario	5	6	6

Second round
15	(Belgium) D Van Roost	6	6
(United States) A Miller	1	1
WC	(United Kingdom) L Latimer	1	4
(Belgium) S Appelmans	6	6
(Chinese Taipei) J Lee	2	0
(Austria) S Plischke	6	6
(Poland) M Grzybowska	6	4	3
5	(Spain) A Sánchez Vicario	4	6	6

Third round
15	(Belgium) D Van Roost	6	6
(Belgium) S Appelmans	1	2
(Austria) S Plischke	5	2
5	(Spain) A Sánchez Vicario	7	6

Fourth round
15	(Belgium) D Van Roost	6	3	2
5	(Spain) A Sánchez Vicario	3	6	6

==== Section 3 ====
First round
3	(Czech Republic) J Novotná	6	6
(Czech Republic) S Kleinová	2	2
(Switzerland) E Gagliardi	6	5	4
(Russia) T Panova	4	7	6
(Canada) P Hy-Boulais	4	6	6
(Germany) M Babel	6	2	3
(United States) C Morariu	4	6	6
(Austria) M Maruska	6	1	2
Q	(South Africa) S de Beer	6	6
(Argentina) I Gorrochategui	4	4
(United States) K Brandi	6^{4}	5
(Chinese Taipei) S-t Wang	7^{7}	7
(Germany) B Rittner	7^{8}	6
(France) A Cocheteux	6^{6}	0
(Italy) F Lubiani	5	3
10	(Romania) I Spîrlea	7	6

Second round
3	(Czech Republic) J Novotná	6	4	6
(Russia) T Panova	3	6	1
(Canada) P Hy-Boulais	5	0
(United States) C Morariu	7	6
Q	(South Africa) S de Beer	6	4	6
(Chinese Taipei) S-t Wang	2	6	3
(Germany) B Rittner	4	4
10	(Romania) I Spîrlea	6	6

Third round
3	(Czech Republic) J Novotná	6	6
(United States) C Morariu	3	1
Q	(South Africa) S de Beer	4	4
10	(Romania) I Spîrlea	6	6

Fourth round
3	(Czech Republic) J Novotná	6	6
10	(Romania) I Spîrlea	2	3

==== Section 4 ====
First round
LL	(United States) L Osterloh	2	6	1
(United States) K Po	6	2	6
(Germany) A Glass	1	7^{7}	3
(Spain) V Ruano Pascual	6	6^{4}	6
(Italy) L Golarsa	4	3
(United States) S Williams	6	6
(Israel) A Smashnova	4	7^{7}	3
(Croatia) M Lučić	6	6^{5}	6
(United States) G Helgeson-Nielsen	6	0	2
(United States) C Rubin	4	6	6
(United States) T Snyder	6	6
(Czech Republic) L Němečková	3	0
(Austria) B Schett	6	6
(Bulgaria) P Stoyanova	0	2
(Canada) J Nejedly	3	3
7	(United States) V Williams	6	6

Second round
(United States) K Po	2	4
(Spain) V Ruano Pascual	6	6
(United States) S Williams	6	6
(Croatia) M Lučić	3	0
(United States) C Rubin	3	7	11
(United States) T Snyder	6	5	9
(Austria) B Schett	1	2
7	(United States) V Williams	6	6

Third round
(Spain) V Ruano Pascual	7	4
(United States) S Williams	5	1^{r}
(United States) C Rubin	3	4
7	(United States) V Williams	6	6

Fourth round
(Spain) V Ruano Pascual	3	1
7	(United States) V Williams	6	6

=== Bottom half ===
==== Section 5 ====
First round
6	(United States) M Seles	6	6
(Spain) M Sánchez Lorenzo	3	4
(France) A Fusai	6	6
(Slovakia) K Studeníková	3	2
(Indonesia) Y Basuki	6	6
(United States) S Reeves	4	0
(France) A Mauresmo	6	6
Q	(Germany) M Schnitzer	3	4
(Australia) N Pratt	4	6	4
WC	(United States) J Capriati	6	3	6
WC	(United States) L McNeil	2	6	6
Q	(Belgium) E Callens	6	4	4
(Netherlands) S Noorlander	6	6
(Ukraine) O Lugina	3	1
Q	(Australia) R Stubbs	6^{5}	0
14	(France) S Testud	7^{7}	6

Second round
6	(United States) M Seles	6	6
(France) A Fusai	1	1
(Indonesia) Y Basuki	6	6
(France) A Mauresmo	3	4
WC	(United States) J Capriati	6	4	2
WC	(United States) L McNeil	4	6	6
(Netherlands) S Noorlander	3	1
14	(France) S Testud	6	6

Third round
6	(United States) M Seles	6	6
(Indonesia) Y Basuki	2	3
WC	(United States) L McNeil	3	6^{7}
14	(France) S Testud	6	7^{9}

Fourth round
6	(United States) M Seles	6	6
14	(France) S Testud	3	2

==== Section 6 ====
First round
11	(France) M Pierce	6^{4}	3
(Ukraine) E Tatarkova	7^{7}	6
(Austria) B Schwartz	6^{5}	3
(South Africa) M de Swardt	7^{7}	6
(Czech Republic) A Gerši	1	1
(Sweden) Å Carlsson	6	6
(Germany) E Wagner	6	3	2
(Netherlands) M Oremans	2	6	6
(Japan) N Miyagi	6	1	6
WC	(United Kingdom) J Pullin	3	6	2
(Belarus) N Zvereva	7	6
(Australia) R McQuillan	5	4
(Slovakia) H Nagyová	6^{3}	6	6
(United States) A Frazier	7^{7}	2	4
(Spain) G León García	4	1
4	(Germany) S Graf	6	6

Second round
(Ukraine) E Tatarkova	4	6^{5}
(South Africa) M de Swardt	6	7^{7}
(Sweden) Å Carlsson	2	3
(Netherlands) M Oremans	6	6
(Japan) N Miyagi	1	3
(Belarus) N Zvereva	6	6
(Slovakia) H Nagyová	0	4
4	(Germany) S Graf	6	6

Third round
(South Africa) M de Swardt	4	5
(Netherlands) M Oremans	6	7
(Belarus) N Zvereva	6	7
4	(Germany) S Graf	4	5

Fourth round
(Netherlands) M Oremans	4	2
(Belarus) N Zvereva	6	6

==== Section 7 ====
First round
8	(Spain) C Martínez	6	6
(Italy) S Farina	1	0
(Netherlands) K Boogert	3	6	6
(Japan) M Saeki	6	2	1
(Argentina) M Díaz Oliva	6	6
(Argentina) P Suárez	3	2
(France) A-G Sidot	3	6	2
WC	(United Kingdom) S Smith	6	4	6
(South Korea) S-h Park	2	4
(France) J Halard-Decugis	6	6
(Belarus) O Barabanschikova	4	7^{7}	9
(France) A Dechaume-Balleret	6	6^{5}	11
(Croatia) I Majoli	6	6
(Slovakia) K Habšudová	2	3
Q	(Japan) H Inoue	6	1	3
16	(France) N Tauziat	2	6	6

Second round
8	(Spain) C Martínez	7	7
(Netherlands) K Boogert	5	5
(Argentina) M Díaz Oliva	1	3
WC	(United Kingdom) S Smith	6	6
(France) J Halard-Decugis	6	7^{8}
(France) A Dechaume-Balleret	4	6^{6}
(Croatia) I Majoli	0	1
16	(France) N Tauziat	6	6

Third round
8	(Spain) C Martínez	6	3	5
WC	(United Kingdom) S Smith	2	6	7
(France) J Halard-Decugis	6^{5}	6	4
16	(France) N Tauziat	7^{7}	3	6

Fourth round
WC	(United Kingdom) S Smith	3	1
16	(France) N Tauziat	6	6

==== Section 8 ====
First round
9	(South Africa) A Coetzer	6	6
(Australia) K-A Guse	2	2
(Japan) N Sawamatsu	2	6	6
(Austria) B Paulus	6	3	2
(China) F Li	1	4
(Italy) R Grande	6	6
(Spain) M Serna	7	4	6
Q	(Czech Republic) R Bobková	5	6	1
LL	(United States) K Miller	6	3	4
(Japan) N Kijimuta	3	6	6
(Venezuela) M Vento	7^{7}	4	6
(United States) S Cacic	6^{1}	6	3
(France) S Pitkowski	1	7	3
(Latvia) L Neiland	6	5	6
(Argentina) F Labat	2	2
2	(United States) L Davenport	6	6

Second round
9	(South Africa) A Coetzer	6	3	2
(Japan) N Sawamatsu	3	6	6
(Italy) R Grande	4	1
(Spain) M Serna	6	6
(Japan) N Kijimuta	0	5
(Venezuela) M Vento	6	7
(Latvia) L Neiland	1	5
2	(United States) L Davenport	6	7

Third round
(Japan) N Sawamatsu	3	7	0
(Spain) M Serna	6	5	6
(Venezuela) M Vento	3	6	2
2	(United States) L Davenport	6	1	6

Fourth round
(Spain) M Serna	1	0
2	(United States) L Davenport	6	6

Preceded by 1998 French Open – Women's singles	Grand Slam women's singles	Succeeded by 1998 US Open – Women's singles
