= 1994 Volkswagen Cup – Doubles =

1994 sports event

Doubles
- 1994 Volkswagen Cup
- 1993 Champions: (United States) Gigi Fernández; (Belarus) Natasha Zvereva

Final
- Champions: (United States) Gigi Fernández; (Belarus) Natalia Zvereva
- Runners-up: (Argentina) Inés Gorrochategui; (Czech Republic) Helena Suková
- Score: 6–7^{(4–7)}, 6–4, 6–3

Details
- Draw: 28 (1WC/1Q)
- Seeds: 8

Events
Singles	Doubles
- Eastbourne International

Gigi Fernández and Natalia Zvereva were the defending champions and beat Inés Gorrochategui and Helena Suková, 6–7^{(4–7)}, 6–4, 6–3, in the final to retain the title.

== Seeds ==
Champion seeds are indicated in bold text while text in italics indicates the round in which those seeds were eliminated. The top four seeded teams received byes into the second round.

1. (United States) **Gigi Fernández** / (Belarus) **Natalia Zvereva (champions)**
2. (United States) Patty Fendick / (United States) Meredith McGrath (second round)
3. (Argentina) Inés Gorrochategui / (Czech Republic) Helena Suková (final)
4. (United States) Lori McNeil / (United States) Pam Shriver (semifinals)
5. (Netherlands) Manon Bollegraf / (United States) Zina Garrison-Jackson (second round)
6. (Ukraine) Natalia Medvedeva / (Latvia) Larisa Savchenko (quarterfinals)
7. (France) Julie Halard / (France) Nathalie Tauziat (first round)
8. (Czech Republic) Jana Novotná / (France) Mary Pierce (quarterfinals)

== Draw ==
Key

- Q = Qualifier
- WC = Wild card
- LL = Lucky loser
- Alt = Alternate
- ITF = ITF entry
- PR = Protected ranking
- SR = Special ranking
- SE = Special exempt
- JE = Junior exempt
- JR = Junior Accelerator Programme entrant
- CO = College Accelerator Programme entrant
- NG = Next Gen Accelerator Program entrant
- w/o = Walkover
- r = Retired
- d = Defaulted

=== Final ===
Final

1
- (United States) **Gigi Fernández**
- (Belarus) **Natalia Zvereva**
6^{4}
**6**
**6**

3
(Argentina) Inés Gorrochategui
(Czech Republic) Helena Suková
**7^{7}**
4
3

=== Top half ===
First round

Second round

Quarterfinals

Semifinals

1
- (United States) **Fernández**
- (Belarus) **N Zvereva**
4
**6**
**7**

- (Italy) **L Golarsa**
- (Netherlands) **C Vis**
4
**6**
**6**

- (Italy) L Golarsa
- (Netherlands) C Vis
**6**
1
5

- (United States) L Harvey-Wild
- (United States) C Rubin
**6**
3
0

1
- (United States) **Fernández**
- (Belarus) **N Zvereva**
**6**
**7**

- (South Africa) M Joubert
- (United States) J Watanabe
4
2

8
- (Czech Republic) J Novotná
- (France) M Pierce
4
5

- (United States) **N Arendt**
- (Australia) **K Radford**
**6**
**6**

- (United States) N Arendt
- (Australia) K Radford
**6**
6
2

- (United States) S Reece
- (United States) M Werdel
2
3

8
- (Czech Republic) **J Novotná**
- (France) **M Pierce**
3
**7**
**6**

8
- (Czech Republic) **J Novotná**
- (France) **M Pierce**
**6**
**6**

1
- (United States) **Fernández**
- (Belarus) **N Zvereva**
**6**
5
**6**

4
- (United States) L McNeil
- (United States) P Shriver
1
**7**
0

4
- (United States) **L McNeil**
- (United States) **P Shriver**
**6**
**6**

4
- (Kazakhstan) **E Likhovtseva**
- (Germany) **C Schneider**
**6**
3
**6**

- (Kazakhstan) E Likhovtseva
- (Germany) C Schneider
1
0

WC
- (Australia) J Taylor
- (United Kingdom) J Ward
4
**6**
1

4
- (United States) **L McNeil**
- (United States) **P Shriver**
**6**
3
5

- (Belgium) S Appelmans
- (South Africa) E Reinach
4
**6**
5

- (Germany) C Singer
- (Romania) I Spîrlea
4
**6**
**7**

- (Germany) **C Singer**
- (Romania) **I Spîrlea**
**6**
4
**7**

- (Germany) **C Singer**
- (Romania) **I Spîrlea**
**7**
6
**6**

WC
- (France) A Fusai
- (United Kingdom) S-A Siddall
**6**
3
4

5
- (Netherlands) M Bollegraf
- (United States) Z Garrison-Jackson
6
**7**
4

5
- (Netherlands) **M Bollegraf**
- (United States) **Z Garrison-Jackson**
1
**6**
**6**

=== Bottom half ===
First round

Second round

Quarterfinals

Semifinals

6
- (Ukraine) **N Medvedeva**
- (Latvia) **L Savchenko**
**7**
**6**

- (Netherlands) K Boogert
- (United Kingdom) J Durie
6
4

6
- (Ukraine) **N Medvedeva**
- (Latvia) **L Savchenko**
**6**
**6**

- (United States) **B Nagelsen**
- (Netherlands) **B Schultz**
5
**6**
**6**

- (United States) B Nagelsen
- (Netherlands) B Schultz
4
2

- (Italy) S Farina
- (United States) G Helgeson-Nielsen
**7**
4
2

6
- (Ukraine) N Medvedeva
- (Latvia) L Savchenko
2
**6**
2

- (United States) A Frazier
- (United States) K Po
1
3

3
- (Argentina) **I Gorrochategui**
- (Czech Republic) **H Suková**
**6**
3
**6**

- (Australia) **R McQuillan**
- (Netherlands) **M Oremans**
**6**
**6**

- (Australia) R McQuillan
- (Netherlands) M Oremans
5
**7^{7}**
6

3
- (Argentina) **I Gorrochategui**
- (Czech Republic) **H Suková**
**7**
6^{4}
**8**

3
- (Argentina) **I Gorrochategui**
- (Czech Republic) **H Suková**
**6**
6^{5}
**6**

7
- (France) J Halard
- (France) N Tauziat
3
4

- (United Kingdom) V Lake
- (United Kingdom) C Wood
4
**7^{7}**
4

- (United Kingdom) **V Lake**
- (United Kingdom) **C Wood**
**6**
**6**

- (United Kingdom) **V Lake**
- (United Kingdom) **C Wood**
**6**
6
**16**

- (Netherlands) **I Driehuis**
- (Croatia) **M Murić**
**6**
4
**6**

- (Netherlands) I Driehuis
- (Croatia) M Murić
3
**7**
14

Q
- (Japan) M Endo
- (Japan) N Sawamatsu
3
**6**
4

- (United Kingdom) **V Lake**
- (United Kingdom) **C Wood**
1
**6**
**6**

- (Canada) **J Hetherington**
- (United States) **S Stafford**
3
**6**
**8**

- (Canada) J Hetherington
- (United States) S Stafford
**6**
3
4

- (Australia) J Byrne
- (New Zealand) J Richardson
**6**
3
6

- (Canada) **J Hetherington**
- (United States) **S Stafford**
**6**
**7**

2
- (United States) P Fendick
- (United States) M McGrath
4
6
