= Megan Miller (tennis) =

British-American tennis player

Megan Behan
- Full name: Megan Behan (nee Miller)
- Country (sports): United Kingdom
- Born: 20 September 1977 (age 48)
- Prize money: $27,337

Singles
- Highest ranking: No. 235 (13 January 1997)

Grand Slam singles results
- Wimbledon: 1R (1995, 1996)

Doubles
- Highest ranking: No. 596 (24 February 1997)

Megan Behan (born 20 September 1977) is a British-American former professional tennis player. She competed under her maiden name Megan Miller.

== Biography ==
Miller grew up in Florida but competed as a British player, as she held British citizenship through her father.

On the professional tour, Miller reached a best ranking of 235 in the world. Her best performances on the WTA Tour were second round appearances at the British Clay Court Champs in 1995 and Birmingham in 1996, with wins over Silke Frankl and Laxmi Poruri respectively. She twice received a wildcard to compete in the women's singles main draw at Wimbledon. In 1995 she lost in the first round to 10th seed Natalia Zvereva, then in 1996 was beaten in the first round by countrywoman Rachel Viollet, another American raised British player.

Miller played college tennis at Duke University, earning ITA All-American honors in 2000.

Now known as Megan Behan, she works as a realtor in Texas.

== ITF finals ==
=== Doubles (0-1) ===
Result	Date	Location	Surface	Partner	Opponents	Score
Loss	8 February 1997	Sunderland, Great Britain	Hard (i)	(United Kingdom) Rachel Viollet	(United Kingdom) Shirli-Ann Siddall (United Kingdom) Amanda Wainwright	6–7^{(2)}, 4–6
