= 1994 Volkswagen Cup =

- Date: 13–18 June
- Edition: 20th
- Category: Tier II
- Draw: 64S / 32D
- Prize money: $400,000
- Surface: Grass
- Location: Eastbourne, United Kingdom
- Venue: Devonshire Park

Champions

Singles
- (United States) Meredith McGrath

Doubles
- (United States) Gigi Fernández / (Belarus) Natalia Zvereva
- Eastbourne International

The 1994 Volkswagen Cup, also known as the Eastbourne International, was a women's tennis tournament played on grass courts at the Devonshire Park Lawn Tennis Club in Eastbourne in the United Kingdom that was part of Tier II of the 1994 WTA Tour. It was the 20th edition of the tournament and was held from 13 June until 18 June 1994. Unseeded Meredith McGrath won the singles title.

== Finals ==
=== Singles ===
(United States) Meredith McGrath defeated (United States) Linda Harvey-Wild 6–2, 6–4

- It was McGrath's second singles title of the year and the second of her career.

=== Doubles ===
(United States) Gigi Fernández / (Belarus) Natalia Zvereva defeated (Argentina) Inés Gorrochategui / (Czech Republic) Helena Suková 6–7^{(4–7)}, 6–4, 6–3

- It was Fernandez's 7th doubles title of the year and the 51st of her career. It was Zvereva's 7th doubles title of the year and the 46th of her career.
