= Rachel Viollet =

Professional British softball player

- Full name: Rachel Viollet
- Country (sports): Great Britain
- Born: 11 February 1972 (age 54) Manchester, England

Grand Slam singles results
- Wimbledon: 2R (1996)

Rachel Viollet (born 11 February 1972) is a former professional British tennis player, documentary director, and film producer. She played collegiate tennis for the Miami Hurricanes at the University of Miami in Coral Gables, Florida.

== Biography ==
Viollet, who was born in Manchester, has lived in the United States since the age of two. She is the daughter of Dennis Viollet, a Manchester United footballer who was a member of the famed Busby Babes and a survivor of the Munich air disaster. Much of her childhood was spent in Jacksonville, Florida, where her father coached football.

From 1991 to 1995 she studied at the University of Miami. As a member of the collegiate tennis team she had her best season in 1995 when she was the "Big East Player of the Year", won the Rolex Regional Championships, and made the quarter-finals of the NCAA Championships. Viollet finished the season as an All-American, and the #4 ranked singles player in the nation. She graduated in 1995 with two degrees, a B.S. in film production, and a B.S. in Psychology.

After graduation in 1995 Viollet turned professional. She played as a qualifier in the main draw of the singles at the 1995 Amelia Island Championships.

At the 1996 Wimbledon Championships she played the singles main draw. She defeated fellow British wildcard Megan Miller in the first round, then was beaten by 16th seed Martina Hingis in the second round. In 1996 Viollet was the number one ranked female British professional tennis player.

Viollet continued playing on the tour until 1997, then took time away to look after her father, who was suffering from brain cancer. In 2000 she returned to tennis.

In 2002, at the age of 30, she debuted for the Great Britain Fed Cup team with wins over Malta's Sarah Wetz in singles and partnering Lucie Ahl in doubles against Norway. In June that year she made her second Wimbledon appearance. She lost to Magdalena Maleeva in the first round of the singles and also featured in the women's doubles with Anne Keothavong.

The University of Miami inducted Viollet into its Sports Hall of Fame in 2007.

In 2021 Viollet released the documentary "Big Time Soccer" about the original North American Soccer League that created the first professional soccer boom in the United States. The film premiered at the National Soccer Hall of Fame. In 2016, Viollet released the documentary “Dennis Viollet: A United Man”, which premiered on Manchester United Television Network. The film tells the story of her father, a Manchester United soccer player who survived the Munich air-crash and moved to America in the 1960s, where he helped pioneer professional soccer. Both documentaries have subsequently been released world-wide on Amazon Prime.

== ITF finals ==
=== Singles (1-1) ===
Result	No.	Date	Tournament	Surface	Opponent	Score
Win	1.	28 August 1995	San Salvador, El Salvador	Clay	(United Kingdom) Joanne Moore	6–3, 6–0
Loss	2.	6 August 2000	Harrisonburg, United States	Clay	(United States) Michelle Dasso	3–6, 4–6

=== Doubles (1–1) ===
Result	No.	Date	Tournament	Surface	Partner	Opponents	Score
Win	1.	16 July 1989	Dublin, Ireland	Grass	(United Kingdom) Barbara Griffiths	(Netherlands) Pascale Druyts (West Germany) Cora Linneman	6–3, 6–4
Loss	2.	8 February 1997	Sunderland, Great Britain	Hard (i)	(United Kingdom) Megan Miller	(United Kingdom) Shirli-Ann Siddall (United Kingdom) Amanda Wainwright	6–7^{(2)}, 4–6

== See also ==
- List of Great Britain Fed Cup team representatives
