= Louise Latimer (tennis) =

British tennis player

- Full name: Louise Latimer
- Country (sports): Great Britain
- Born: 19 January 1978 (age 47); Norwich, England
- Height: 168 cm (5 ft 6 in)
- Plays: Right-handed
- Prize money: $188,127

Singles
- Career titles: 0 WTA / 4 ITF
- Highest ranking: No. 107 (15 January 2001)

Grand Slam singles results
- Australian Open: 1R (2001)
- Wimbledon: 2R (1998, 1999, 2000)

Doubles

Grand Slam doubles results
- Wimbledon: 1R (1998, 2000, 2001)

Louise Latimer (born 19 January 1978) is a former professional tennis player from Great Britain.

== Biography ==
Latimer was born and raised in Norwich for the first 12 years of her life, before her family moved to Sutton Coldfield in Birmingham. Her father Colin worked at Birmingham University and her mother Jo was a nurse.

A right-handed player, Latimer turned professional in 1995 and won her first ITF title in Portugal in 1997.

Latimer debuted in the Wimbledon main draw in 1998 and beat Jana Kandarr, before exiting in the second round. She made the second round at Wimbledon on a further two occasions, including in 2000, when she took 11th seed Anke Huber to three sets.

In 2000 she won two ITF $25,000 titles, in Hull and Surbiton. To win the title in Surbiton she defeated Tamarine Tanasugarn in the final and earlier in the tournament had a win over Alexandra Stevenson.

Latimer featured in a total of 11 Fed Cup ties for Great Britain. She had a 4/5 record in singles and was unbeaten in her four doubles rubbers.

Having ended both 1999 and 2000 as the British number one, Latimer peaked at 107 in the world in January, 2001, before retiring mid year following a drop in form.

== ITF finals ==
$25,000 tournaments
$10,000 tournaments

=== Singles (4–1) ===
Result	No.	Date	Tournament	Surface	Opponent	Score
Win	1.	21 December 1997	Estoril, Portugal	Carpet	(Germany) Athina Briegel	6–3, 3–6, 7–5
Win	2.	18 January 1998	Delray Beach, United States	Hard	(Switzerland) Miroslava Vavrinec	6–2, 6–0
Loss	1.	21 February 1999	Redbridge, United Kingdom	Hard (i)	(Czech Republic) Sandra Kleinová	2–6, 1–6
Win	3.	11 June 2000	Surbiton, United Kingdom	Grass	(Thailand) Tamarine Tanasugarn	7–5, 6–3
Win	4.	5 November 2000	Hull, United Kingdom	Hard	(United Kingdom) Julie Pullin	4–2, 4–2, 4–1

=== Doubles (1–3) ===
Result	No.	Date	Tournament	Surface	Partner	Opponents	Score
Win	1.	31 July 1995	Ilkley, United Kingdom	Clay	(United Kingdom) Jasmine Choudhury	(United Kingdom) Lucie Ahl (United Kingdom) Joanne Ward	1–6, 6–2, 6–2
Loss	1.	11 August 1996	Southsea, United Kingdom	Grass	(United Kingdom) Lorna Woodroffe	(United Kingdom) Shirli-Ann Siddall (United Kingdom) Lucie Ahl	2–6, 6–7
Loss	2.	30 September 1996	Thessaloniki, Greece	Hard	(Bulgaria) Maria Geznenge	(Czech Republic) Jindra Gabrišová (North Macedonia) Ivona Mihailova	4–6, 2–6
Loss	3.	13 September 1998	Edinburgh, United Kingdom	Clay	(United Kingdom) Helen Reesby	(Italy) Francesca Schiavone (Italy) Antonella Serra Zanetti	3–6, 3–6

== See also ==
- List of Great Britain Fed Cup team representatives
