= 1989 Wimbledon Championships – Women's doubles qualifying =

Women's doubles qualifying
- 1989 Wimbledon Championships

Events
Singles	men	women		boys	girls
Doubles	men	women	mixed	boys	girls
WC Singles	men	women	quad
WC Doubles	men	women	quad
Legends	men	women	seniors

Qualification
Singles	men	women
Doubles	men	women	mixed
- Wimbledon Championships

Players and pairs who neither have high enough rankings nor receive wild cards may participate in a qualifying tournament held one week before the annual Wimbledon Tennis Championships.

== Qualifiers ==
1. (Australia) Kate McDonald / (Australia) Kristine Radford
2. (Hong Kong) Patricia Hy / (United States) Meredith McGrath
3. (Japan) Maya Kidowaki / (Japan) Akemi Nishiya
4. (Japan) Rika Hiraki / (Netherlands) Amy van Buuren

== Lucky losers ==
1. (United States) Leigh-Anne Eldredge / (Republic of Ireland) Lesley O'Halloran
2. (United States) Anna-Maria Fernandez / (Brazil) Themis Zambrzycki

== Qualifying draw ==
=== First qualifier ===
First round
(United States) Donna Faber (South Africa) Rikki Gaddie	6	6
(South Africa) Toni Gaddie (Argentina) Cristina Tessi	4	2
(United Kingdom) Kaye Hand (United Kingdom) Karen Hunter	4	5
(United States) Leigh-Anne Eldredge (Republic of Ireland) Lesley O'Halloran	6	7

Second round
(Australia) Kate McDonald (Australia) Kristine Radford	6	6
(United States) Donna Faber (South Africa) Rikki Gaddie	3	2
(United States) Leigh-Anne Eldredge (Republic of Ireland) Lesley O'Halloran	4	6	6
(Hong Kong) Paulette Moreno (New Zealand) Ruth Seeman	6	3	4

Qualifying competition
(Australia) Kate McDonald (Australia) Kristine Radford	6	6
(United States) Leigh-Anne Eldredge (Republic of Ireland) Lesley O'Halloran	2	2

=== Second qualifier ===
First round
(South Africa) Gail Boon (Brazil) Gisele Miró	6	6
(United Kingdom) Caroline Billingham (United States) Rita Winebarger	3	2
(United Kingdom) Glynis Coles (United Kingdom) Denise Parnell	4	1
(Australia) Madison Bishop (United States) Jaime Kaplan	6	6

Second round
(Hong Kong) Patricia Hy (United States) Meredith McGrath	6	6
(South Africa) Gail Boon (Brazil) Gisele Miró	2	0
(Australia) Madison Bishop (United States) Jaime Kaplan	6	6
(Japan) Kimiko Date (Japan) Naoko Sato	3	2

Qualifying competition
(Hong Kong) Patricia Hy (United States) Meredith McGrath	6	7
(Australia) Madison Bishop (United States) Jaime Kaplan	4	5

=== Third qualifier ===
First round
(United Kingdom) Teresa Catlin (United Kingdom) Katie Rickett	w/o
(United Kingdom) Amanda Gregory (United Kingdom) Rachel Viollet
(United Kingdom) Sue Mitten (United Kingdom) Jane Wood	6	6
(United States) Debbie Graham (United States) Jennifer Santrock	4	4

Second round
(Czechoslovakia) Eva Švíglerová (France) Noëlle van Lottum	w/o
(United Kingdom) Amanda Gregory (United Kingdom) Rachel Viollet
(United Kingdom) Sue Mitten (United Kingdom) Jane Wood	4	2
(Japan) Maya Kidowaki (Japan) Akemi Nishiya	6	6

Qualifying competition
(United Kingdom) Amanda Gregory (United Kingdom) Rachel Viollet	1	1
(Japan) Maya Kidowaki (Japan) Akemi Nishiya	6	6

=== Fourth qualifier ===
First round
(South Africa) Joannette Kruger (South Africa) Monica Reinach	7	4	6
(United Kingdom) Alison Fleming (United Kingdom) Michele Mair	5	6	1
(South Africa) Robyn Field (United Kingdom) Lisa Gould	6	6
(United Kingdom) J Iddles (United Kingdom) Alison Smith	1	2

Second round
(United States) Anna-Maria Fernandez (Brazil) Themis Zambrzycki	2	6	6
(South Africa) Joannette Kruger (South Africa) Monica Reinach	6	4	3
(South Africa) Robyn Field (United Kingdom) Lisa Gould	6^{3}	0
(Japan) Rika Hiraki (Netherlands) Amy van Buuren	7^{7}	6

Qualifying competition
(United States) Anna-Maria Fernandez (Brazil) Themis Zambrzycki	4	7^{7}	2
(Japan) Rika Hiraki (Netherlands) Amy van Buuren	6	6^{4}	6
