= 1990 Virginia Slims of Oklahoma – Singles =

Singles
- 1990 Virginia Slims of Oklahoma

Final
- Champion: (United States) Amy Frazier
- Runner-up: (Netherlands) Manon Bollegraf
- Score: 6–4, 6–2

Details
- Draw: 32 (4Q)
- Seeds: 8

Events
Singles	Doubles
← 1989 ·	U.S. National Indoor Championships	· 1991 →

Manon Bollegraf was the defending champion, but lost in the final to 17-year-old Amy Frazier. The score was 6–4, 6–2.

== Seeds ==
1. (Switzerland) Manuela Maleeva-Fragnière (semifinals)
2. (Italy) Raffaella Reggi (second round)
3. (United States) Amy Frazier (champion)
4. (Sweden) Catarina Lindqvist (second round)
5. (Netherlands) Manon Bollegraf (final)
6. (Australia) Anne Minter (quarterfinals)
7. (United States) Betsy Nagelsen (first round)
8. (Japan) Etsuko Inoue (quarterfinals)

== Draw ==
=== Key ===
- Q = Qualifier
- WC = Wild card
- LL = Lucky loser
- Alt = Alternate
- SE = Special exempt
- PR = Protected ranking
- ITF = ITF entry
- JE = Junior exempt
- w/o = Walkover
- r = Retired
- d = Defaulted
- SR = Special ranking

=== Finals ===
Semifinals
1	(Switzerland) Manuela Maleeva-Fragnière	6	3	3
3	(United States) Amy Frazier	1	6	6
5	(Netherlands) Manon Bollegraf	6	7
(Mexico) Angélica Gavaldón	4	5

Final
3	(United States) Amy Frazier	6	6
5	(Netherlands) Manon Bollegraf	4	2

=== Top half ===
First round
1	(Switzerland) M Maleeva-Fragnière	6	6
Q	(United Kingdom) S Smith	2	1
(United States) K Jordan	7	6	6
(United States) H Na	6	7	3
(United States) R White	7	7
(United States) T Whitlinger	6	6
(United Kingdom) M Javer	2	3
8	(Japan) E Inoue	6	6
3	(United States) A Frazier	6	1	7
Q	(Canada) P Hy	3	6	6
(Japan) N Miyagi	6	7
(United States) Ca MacGregor	2	5
(United States) W White	3	4
(United States) ML Daniels	6	6
(United States) M Werdel	6	6	3
6	(Australia) A Minter	7	4	6

Second round
1	(Switzerland) M Maleeva-Fragnière	6	6
(United States) K Jordan	1	2
(United States) R White	6	1
8	(Japan) E Inoue	7	6
3	(United States) A Frazier	6	6
(Japan) N Miyagi	2	0
(United States) ML Daniels	1	6	0
6	(Australia) A Minter	6	3	6

Quarterfinals
1	(Switzerland) M Maleeva-Fragnière	6	6
8	(Japan) E Inoue	2	0
3	(United States) A Frazier	6	7
6	(Australia) A Minter	2	6

Semifinals
1	(Switzerland) M Maleeva-Fragnière	6	3	3
3	(United States) A Frazier	1	6	6

=== Bottom half ===
First round
5	(Netherlands) M Bollegraf	6	6
(South Africa) A Coetzer	1	3
(United States) C Cunningham	6	6
Q	(Peru) P Vásquez	2	4
(Canada) R Simpson	6	0	1
Q	(United States) J Santrock	3	6	6
(United States) C Benjamin	2	2
4	(Sweden) C Lindqvist	6	6
7	(United States) B Nagelsen	3	6
(Mexico) A Gavaldón	6	7
(United States) P Louie Harper	6	6
(United States) M Norwood	0	2
(United States) L Allen	1	4
(Netherlands) B Schultz	6	6
(Sweden) M Strandlund	3	3
2	(Italy) R Reggi	6	6

Second round
5	(Netherlands) M Bollegraf	6	6
(United States) C Cunningham	4	2
Q	(United States) J Santrock	1	6	6
4	(Sweden) C Lindqvist	6	1	4
(Mexico) A Gavaldón	6	6
(United States) P Louie Harper	1	4
(Netherlands) B Schultz	7	6
2	(Italy) R Reggi	5	2

Quarterfinals
5	(Netherlands) M Bollegraf	6	6
Q	(United States) J Santrock	4	2
(Mexico) A Gavaldón	3	6	7
(Netherlands) B Schultz	6	4	5

Semifinals
5	(Netherlands) M Bollegraf	6	7
(Mexico) A Gavaldón	4	5
