= 1990 Virginia Slims of Oklahoma – Doubles =

Doubles
- 1990 Virginia Slims of Oklahoma

Final
- Champions: (United States) Mary Lou Daniels (United States) Wendy White
- Runners-up: (Netherlands) Manon Bollegraf (South Africa) Lise Gregory
- Score: 7–5, 6–2

Details
- Draw: 16
- Seeds: 4

Events
Singles	Doubles
← 1989 ·	U.S. National Indoor Championships	· 1991 →

Lori McNeil and Betsy Nagelsen were the defending champions, but none competed this year.

Mary Lou Daniels and Wendy White won the title by defeating Manon Bollegraf and Lise Gregory 7–5, 6–2 in the final.

== Seeds ==
1. (Netherlands) Manon Bollegraf / (South Africa) Lise Gregory (final)
2. (United States) Mary Lou Daniels / (United States) Wendy White (champions)
3. (United States) Hu Na / (United States) Peanut Louie Harper (semifinals)
4. (Sweden) Catarina Lindqvist / (Australia) Anne Minter (quarterfinals)

== Draw ==
=== Key ===
- Q = Qualifier
- WC = Wild card
- LL = Lucky loser
- Alt = Alternate
- SE = Special exempt
- PR = Protected ranking
- ITF = ITF entry
- JE = Junior exempt
- w/o = Walkover
- r = Retired
- d = Defaulted
- SR = Special ranking

=== Draw ===
First round
1	(Netherlands) M Bollegraf (South Africa) L Gregory	3	6	6
(United States) L Allen (United States) Ca MacGregor	6	4	2
(United States) J Santrock (Japan) Y Koizumi	3	3
(United States) C Benjamin (Japan) R Hiraki	6	6
4	(Sweden) C Lindqvist (Australia) A Minter	6	6
(United States) J Fuchs (Sweden) M Strandlund	2	3
(United States) A Frazier (United States) L Spadea	7	2	4
(Netherlands) B Schultz (Netherlands) C Vis	6	6	6
(United States) A Grousbeck (Japan) N Miyagi	3	6	6
(Poland) I Kuczyńska (Canada) R Simpson	6	2	3
(United States) C Cunningham (Mexico) A Gavaldón	2	3
3	(United States) H Na (United States) P Louie Harper	6	6
(South Africa) L Barnard (United States) J Thomas	6	2	6
(Denmark) S Albinus (France) N van Lottum	3	6	7
(United States) M Norwood (Argentina) A Villagrán-Reami	1	3
2	(United States) ML Daniels (United States) W White	6	6

Quarterfinals
1	(Netherlands) M Bollegraf (South Africa) L Gregory	3	6	6
(United States) C Benjamin (Japan) R Hiraki	6	3	3
4	(Sweden) C Lindqvist (Australia) A Minter	6	4
(Netherlands) B Schultz (Netherlands) C Vis	7	6
(United States) A Grousbeck (Japan) N Miyagi	1	6
3	(United States) H Na (United States) P Louie Harper	6	7
(Denmark) S Albinus (France) N van Lottum	4	2
2	(United States) ML Daniels (United States) W White	6	6

Semifinals
1	(Netherlands) M Bollegraf (South Africa) L Gregory	6	7
(Netherlands) B Schultz (Netherlands) C Vis	3	6
3	(United States) H Na (United States) P Louie Harper	4	2
2	(United States) ML Daniels (United States) W White	6	6

Final
1	(Netherlands) M Bollegraf (South Africa) L Gregory	5	2
2	(United States) ML Daniels (United States) W White	7	6
