= 1989 Wimbledon Championships – Women's singles qualifying =

Women's singles qualifying
- 1989 Wimbledon Championships

Events
Singles	men	women		boys	girls
Doubles	men	women	mixed	boys	girls
WC Singles	men	women	quad
WC Doubles	men	women	quad
Legends	men	women	seniors

Qualification
Singles	men	women
Doubles	men	women	mixed
- Wimbledon Championships

Players and pairs who neither have high enough rankings nor receive wild cards may participate in a qualifying tournament held one week before the annual Wimbledon Tennis Championships.

== Seeds ==
1. (United States) Jennifer Santrock (second round)
2. (Australia) Michelle Jaggard (qualified)
3. (United States) Kim Steinmetz (first round)
4. (United States) Debbie Graham (qualifying competition, lucky loser)
5. (Netherlands) Carin Bakkum (qualified)
6. (France) Catherine Suire (qualifying competition, lucky loser)
7. (Australia) Elizabeth Minter (second round)
8. (Japan) Nana Miyagi (first round)
9. (Japan) Kimiko Date (qualified)
10. (United States) Lea Antonoplis (second round)
11. (Sweden) Maria Lindström (second round)
12. (Japan) Maya Kidowaki (first round)
13. (Brazil) Gisele Miró (qualifying competition, lucky loser)
14. (West Germany) Christina Singer (qualifying competition)
15. (Italy) Marzia Grossi (second round)
16. (France) Alexia Dechaume (second round)

== Qualifiers ==
1. (Australia) Kristine Radford
2. (Australia) Tracey Morton
3. (Japan) Kimiko Date
4. (United States) Sandy Collins
5. (United States) Jill Smoller
6. (France) Sophie Amiach
7. (Netherlands) Carin Bakkum
8. (Australia) Michelle Jaggard

== Lucky losers ==
1. (United States) Debbie Graham
2. (France) Catherine Suire
3. (Brazil) Gisele Miró

== Qualifying draw ==
=== First qualifier ===
First round
1	(United States) Jennifer Santrock	6	4	6
(United Kingdom) Sarah Mitten	0	6	3
(New Zealand) Ruth Seeman	4	3
(Australia) Kristine Radford	6	6
(South Africa) Rikki Gaddie	6	1
(United Kingdom) Teresa Catlin	2	0^{r}
(Brazil) Themis Zambrzycki	7	0	4
15	(Italy) Marzia Grossi	5	6	6

Second round
1	(United States) Jennifer Santrock	3	5
(Australia) Kristine Radford	6	7
(South Africa) Rikki Gaddie	6	6
15	(Italy) Marzia Grossi	0	2

Qualifying competition
(Australia) Kristine Radford	6	6
(South Africa) Rikki Gaddie	2	3

=== Second qualifier ===
First round
14	(West Germany) Christina Singer	6	6
(United Kingdom) Caroline Billingham	1	4
(United Kingdom) Lisa Gould	6	6
(United Kingdom) Kaye Hand	3	2
(United States) Jeri Ingram	2	2
(United Kingdom) Jo Louis	6	6
(Australia) Tracey Morton	5	6	6
8	(Japan) Nana Miyagi	7	4	2

Second round
14	(West Germany) Christina Singer	6	6
(United Kingdom) Lisa Gould	3	1
(United Kingdom) Jo Louis	2	6	2
(Australia) Tracey Morton	6	3	6

Qualifying competition
14	(West Germany) Christina Singer	3	2
(Australia) Tracey Morton	6	6

=== Third qualifier ===
First round
4	(United States) Debbie Graham	6	6
(United States) Jennifer Fuchs	2	1
(Italy) Simona Isidori	6	6
(United Kingdom) Karen Hunter	2	3
(Belgium) Corinne Bousmans	1	6	1
(Japan) Rika Hiraki	6	4	6
(Australia) Kate McDonald	5	3
9	(Japan) Kimiko Date	7	6

Second round
4	(United States) Debbie Graham	6	2	6
(Italy) Simona Isidori	4	6	3
(Japan) Rika Hiraki	3	0
9	(Japan) Kimiko Date	6	6

Qualifying competition
4	(United States) Debbie Graham	5	4
9	(Japan) Kimiko Date	7	6

=== Fourth qualifier ===
First round
12	(Japan) Maya Kidowaki	3	2
(United States) Sandy Collins	6	6
(South Africa) Linda Barnard	6	5	8
(Austria) Heidi Sprung	3	7	6
(France) Emmanuelle Derly	6	6
(United Kingdom) Sally Timms	2	0
(Hong Kong) Paulette Moreno	1	3
6	(France) Catherine Suire	6	6

Second round
(United States) Sandy Collins	6	2	6
(South Africa) Linda Barnard	4	6	3
(France) Emmanuelle Derly	3	0
6	(France) Catherine Suire	6	6

Qualifying competition
(United States) Sandy Collins	7	6
6	(France) Catherine Suire	5	4

=== Fifth qualifier ===
First round
7	(Australia) Elizabeth Minter	6	7
(United States) Rita Winebarger	4	5
(United States) Jill Smoller	6	6
(United Kingdom) Katie Rickett	1	4
(France) Noëlle van Lottum	3	0
(Hong Kong) Patricia Hy	6	6
(United Kingdom) Linda Harley	1	5
10	(United States) Lea Antonoplis	6	7

Second round
7	(Australia) Elizabeth Minter	2	0
(United States) Jill Smoller	6	6
(Hong Kong) Patricia Hy	6	6	6
10	(United States) Lea Antonoplis	2	7	4

Qualifying competition
(United States) Jill Smoller	3	6	6
(Hong Kong) Patricia Hy	6	4	3

=== Sixth qualifier ===
First round
16	(France) Alexia Dechaume	6	6
(United Kingdom) Alison Fleming	1	0
(United States) Jane Thomas	6	2
(United States) Penny Barg	7	6
(Netherlands) Amy van Buuren	5	6	7
(France) Valérie Batut	7	4	5
(France) Sophie Amiach	6	6
3	(United States) Kim Steinmetz	2	0

Second round
16	(France) Alexia Dechaume	5	5
(United States) Penny Barg	7	7
(Netherlands) Amy van Buuren	7	1	1
(France) Sophie Amiach	5	6	6

Qualifying competition
(United States) Penny Barg	6	3	5
(France) Sophie Amiach	1	6	7

=== Seventh qualifier ===
First round
5	(Netherlands) Carin Bakkum	6	6
(United Kingdom) Denise Parnell	1	2
(United Kingdom) Amanda Gregory	7	7
(South Africa) Lise Gregory	6	6
(South Africa) Robyn Field	6	6
(United Kingdom) Jane Wood	3	3
(United States) Mary Norwood	6	1	4
13	(Brazil) Gisele Miró	3	6	6

Second round
5	(Netherlands) Carin Bakkum	6	6
(United Kingdom) Amanda Gregory	2	1
(South Africa) Robyn Field	0	0
13	(Brazil) Gisele Miró	6	6

Qualifying competition
5	(Netherlands) Carin Bakkum	6	7
13	(Brazil) Gisele Miró	3	5

=== Eighth qualifier ===
First round
11	(Sweden) Maria Lindström	6	6
(West Germany) Astrid Rühr	2	1
(Australia) Lisa O'Neill	6	3	4
(United States) Candy Reynolds	4	6	6
(Australia) Alison Scott	6	6
(South Africa) Gail Boon	4	1
(United States) Sheri Norris	0	0
2	(Australia) Michelle Jaggard	6	6

Second round
11	(Sweden) Maria Lindström	2	6
(United States) Candy Reynolds	6	7
(Australia) Alison Scott	3	5
2	(Australia) Michelle Jaggard	6	7

Qualifying competition
(United States) Candy Reynolds	5	7	2
2	(Australia) Michelle Jaggard	7	6	6
