= 1987 Virginia Slims of Oklahoma – Singles =

Singles
- 1987 Virginia Slims of Oklahoma

Final
- Champion: (Australia) Elizabeth Smylie
- Runner-up: (United States) Lori McNeil
- Score: 4–6, 6–3, 7–5

Details
- Draw: 32 (4Q/1LL)
- Seeds: 8

Events
Singles	Doubles
← 1986 ·	U.S. National Indoor Championships	· 1988 →

Marcella Mesker was the defending champion, but did not compete this year.

Elizabeth Smylie won the title by defeating Lori McNeil 4–6, 6–3, 7–5 in the final.

== Seeds ==
1. (United States) Lori McNeil (final)
2. (Sweden) Catarina Lindqvist (semifinals)
3. (Soviet Union) Larisa Savchenko (semifinals)
4. (Australia) Elizabeth Smylie (champion)
5. (France) Nathalie Herreman (second round)
6. (United States) Beth Herr (first round)
7. (United Kingdom) Sara Gomer (first round)
8. (Spain) Arantxa Sánchez Vicario (first round)

== Draw ==
=== Key ===
- Q = Qualifier
- WC = Wild card
- LL = Lucky loser
- Alt = Alternate
- ITF = ITF entry
- PR = Protected ranking
- SR = Special ranking
- SE = Special exempt
- JE = Junior exempt
- JR = Junior Accelerator Programme entrant
- CO = College Accelerator Programme entrant
- NG = Next Gen Accelerator Program entrant
- w/o = Walkover
- r = Retired
- d = Defaulted

=== Finals ===
Semifinals
1	(United States) Lori McNeil	7	6
3	(Soviet Union) Larisa Savchenko	6	2
4	(Australia) Elizabeth Smylie	6	6
2	(Sweden) Catarina Lindqvist	4	4

Final
1	(United States) Lori McNeil	6	3	5
4	(Australia) Elizabeth Smylie	4	6	7

=== Top half ===
First round
1	(United States) L McNeil	6	6
(France) A Dechaume	2	3
(France) C Suire	1	3
(West Germany) S Meier	6	6
(Soviet Union) S Parkhomenko	6	6
(Italy) S Cecchini	2	4
(United States) H Na	6	6
6	(United States) B Herr	4	3
3	(Soviet Union) L Savchenko	4	6	6
(Soviet Union) N Zvereva	6	4	1
(Australia) N Provis	4	3
(United States) B Gerken	6	6
(United States) A Smith	6	4	3
Q	(Soviet Union) N Bykova	4	6	6
Q	(Switzerland) E Krapl	6	6
8	(Spain) A Sánchez Vicario	0	2

Second round
1	(United States) L McNeil	6	6
(West Germany) S Meier	1	3
(Soviet Union) S Parkhomenko	5	7	0
(United States) H Na	7	6	6
3	(Soviet Union) L Savchenko	6	7
(United States) B Gerken	2	5
Q	(Soviet Union) N Bykova	2	6	6
Q	(Switzerland) E Krapl	6	2	1

Quarterfinals
1	(United States) L McNeil	6	7
(United States) H Na	1	6
3	(Soviet Union) L Savchenko	7	7
Q	(Soviet Union) N Bykova	5	6

Semifinals
1	(United States) L McNeil	7	6
3	(Soviet Union) L Savchenko	6	2

=== Bottom half ===
First round
5	(France) N Herreman	7	7
(United States) V Nelson-Dunbar	5	5
(United States) C Benjamin	6	3	6
(West Germany) C Porwik	4	6	2
(United States) G Kim	3	6	5
(United States) ML Piatek	6	3	7
(United States) T Mochizuki	4	2
4	(Australia) E Smylie	6	6
7	(United Kingdom) S Gomer	6	4
(Australia) E Minter	7	6
(Netherlands) N Jagerman	7	3	3
(United Kingdom) A Croft	6	6	6
Q	(Sweden) C Karlsson	6	6
LL	(France) P Paradis	2	0
Q	(West Germany) W Probst	5	1
2	(Sweden) C Lindqvist	7	6

Second round
5	(France) N Herreman	4	6	5
(United States) C Benjamin	6	4	7
(United States) ML Piatek	6	4	3
4	(Australia) E Smylie	2	6	6
(Australia) E Minter	4	6	6
(United Kingdom) A Croft	6	3	2
Q	(Sweden) C Karlsson	6	6	4
2	(Sweden) C Lindqvist	4	7	6

Quarterfinals
(United States) C Benjamin	2	4
4	(Australia) E Smylie	6	6
(Australia) E Minter	4	2
2	(Sweden) C Lindqvist	6	6

Semifinals
4	(Australia) E Smylie	6	6
2	(Sweden) C Lindqvist	4	4
