= 1987 Virginia Slims of Oklahoma – Doubles =

Doubles
- 1987 Virginia Slims of Oklahoma

Final
- Champions: (Soviet Union) Svetlana Parkhomenko (Soviet Union) Larisa Savchenko
- Runners-up: (United States) Lori McNeil (United States) Kim Sands
- Score: 6–4, 6–4

Details
- Draw: 16
- Seeds: 4

Events
Singles	Doubles
← 1986 ·	U.S. National Indoor Championships	· 1988 →

Marcella Mesker and Pascale Paradis were the defending champions, but Mesker did not compete this year. Paradis teamed up with JoAnne Russell and lost in the first round to Sandy Collins and Catherine Suire.

Svetlana Parkhomenko and Larisa Savchenko won the title by defeating Lori McNeil and Kim Sands 6–4, 6–4 in the final.

== Seeds ==
1. (Soviet Union) Svetlana Parkhomenko / (Soviet Union) Larisa Savchenko (champions)
2. (United States) Lori McNeil / (United States) Kim Sands (final)
3. (United States) Candy Reynolds / (United States) Anne Smith (semifinals)
4. (United States) Sandy Collins / (France) Catherine Suire (semifinals)

== Draw ==
=== Key ===
- Q = Qualifier
- WC = Wild card
- LL = Lucky loser
- Alt = Alternate
- ITF = ITF entry
- PR = Protected ranking
- SR = Special ranking
- SE = Special exempt
- JE = Junior exempt
- JR = Junior Accelerator Programme entrant
- CO = College Accelerator Programme entrant
- NG = Next Gen Accelerator Program entrant
- w/o = Walkover
- r = Retired
- d = Defaulted

=== Draw ===
First round
1	(Soviet Union) S Parkhomenko (Soviet Union) L Savchenko	6	6
(Sweden) C Lindqvist (Sweden) M Lindström	3	3
(United States) H Na (Argentina) A Villagrán	1	3
(Italy) S Cecchini (United States) B Gerken	6	6
3	(United States) C Reynolds (United States) A Smith	7	6
(Netherlands) M Bollegraf (Netherlands) N Jagerman	5	4
(Australia) E Minter (United States) ML Piatek	6	0
(Sweden) C Karlsson (Czechoslovakia) J Novotná	7	6
(West Germany) W Probst (Japan) M Yanagi	5	7	2
(United States) Le Allen (United States) C Benjamin	7	6	6
(France) P Paradis (United States) JA Russell	2	5
4	(United States) S Collins (France) C Suire	6	7
(Czechoslovakia) I Budařová (United States) B Herr	5	6	6
(United States) Lo Allen (United States) Cy MacGregor	7	3	3
(West Germany) S Meier (West Germany) C Porwik	6	4	2
2	(United States) L McNeil (United States) K Sands	4	6	6

Quarterfinals
1	(Soviet Union) S Parkhomenko (Soviet Union) L Savchenko	6	6
(Italy) S Cecchini (United States) B Gerken	1	2
3	(United States) C Reynolds (United States) A Smith	7	6
(Sweden) C Karlsson (Czechoslovakia) J Novotná	6	1
(United States) Le Allen (United States) C Benjamin	3	2
4	(United States) S Collins (France) C Suire	6	6
(Czechoslovakia) I Budařová (United States) B Herr	6	6	3
2	(United States) L McNeil (United States) K Sands	7	3	6

Semifinals
1	(Soviet Union) S Parkhomenko (Soviet Union) L Savchenko	6	7
3	(United States) C Reynolds (United States) A Smith	1	5
4	(United States) S Collins (France) C Suire	3	6	1
2	(United States) L McNeil (United States) K Sands	6	4	6

Final
1	(Soviet Union) S Parkhomenko (Soviet Union) L Savchenko	6	6
2	(United States) L McNeil (United States) K Sands	4	4
