= 1989 Virginia Slims of Oklahoma – Doubles =

Doubles
- 1989 Virginia Slims of Oklahoma
- 1988 Champions: (Czechoslovakia) Jana Novotná (France) Catherine Suire

Final
- Champions: (United States) Lori McNeil (United States) Betsy Nagelsen
- Runners-up: (United States) Elise Burgin (Australia) Elizabeth Smylie
- Score: Walkover

Details
- Draw: 16
- Seeds: 4

Events
Singles	Doubles
← 1988 ·	Virginia Slims of Oklahoma	· 1990 →

Jana Novotná and Catherine Suire were the defending champions but only Suire competed that year with Raffaella Reggi.

Reggi and Suire lost in the semifinals to Elise Burgin and Elizabeth Smylie.

Lori McNeil and Betsy Nagelsen won the final on a walkover against Burgin and Smylie.

== Seeds ==
Champion seeds are indicated in bold text while text in italics indicates the round in which those seeds were eliminated.

1. (United States) **Lori McNeil** / (United States) **Betsy Nagelsen (champions)**
2. (United States) Elise Burgin / (Australia) Elizabeth Smylie (final)
3. (Italy) Raffaella Reggi / (France) Catherine Suire (semifinals)
4. (Netherlands) Manon Bollegraf / (West Germany) Claudia Porwik (semifinals)

== Draw ==
=== Key ===
- Q = Qualifier
- WC = Wild card
- LL = Lucky loser
- Alt = Alternate
- SE = Special exempt
- PR = Protected ranking
- ITF = ITF entry
- JE = Junior exempt
- w/o = Walkover
- r = Retired
- d = Defaulted
- SR = Special ranking

First round

Quarterfinals

Semifinals

Final

1
- (United States) **L McNeil**
- (United States) **B Nagelsen**
**6**
**6**

- (Japan) Y Koizumi
- (United States) M Norwood
2
1

1
- (United States) **L McNeil**
- (United States) **B Nagelsen**
2
**6**
**6**

- (France) **A Dechaume**
- (France) **N Herreman**
**6**
**6**

- (France) A Dechaume
- (France) N Herreman
**6**
0
1

- (South Africa) L Gregory
- (United States) M Van Nostrand
4
0

1
- (United States) **L McNeil**
- (United States) **B Nagelsen**
**7**
**6**

4
- (Netherlands) **M Bollegraf**
- (West Germany) **C Porwik**
**w/o**

4
- (Netherlands) M Bollegraf
- (West Germany) C Porwik
6
3

- (United States) J Kaplan
- (Netherlands) S Schilder

4
- (Netherlands) **M Bollegraf**
- (West Germany) **C Porwik**
**7**
**6**

- (United States) **A Frazier**
- (United States) **D Spence**
**6**
**6**

- (United States) A Frazier
- (United States) D Spence
5
3

- (United States) R Reis
- (United States) P Smith
1
4

1
- (United States) **Lori McNeil**
- (United States) **Betsy Nagelsen**
**w/o**

- (Netherlands) C Bakkum
- (Netherlands) H Witvoet
0
2

2
- (United States) Elise Burgin
- (Australia) Elizabeth Smylie

- (Hong Kong) **P Hy**
- (United States) **M Werdel**
**6**
**6**

- (Hong Kong) P Hy
- (United States) M Werdel
5
3

- (France) M Laval
- (United States) J Prah
1
3

3
- (Italy) **R Reggi**
- (France) **C Suire**
**7**
**6**

3
- (Italy) **R Reggi**
- (France) **C Suire**
**6**
**6**

3
- (Italy) R Reggi
- (France) C Suire
2
1

- (Australia) **D Balestrat**
- (United States) **H Na**
**6**
**6**

2
- (United States) **E Burgin**
- (Australia) **E Smylie**
**6**
**6**

- (Czechoslovakia) D Krajčovičová
- (Switzerland) E Krapl
1
2

- (Australia) D Balestrat
- (United States) H Na
**6**
2
3

- (France) S Amiach
- (United States) J Thomas
1
**6**
6

2
- (United States) **E Burgin**
- (Australia) **E Smylie**
4
**6**
**6**

2
- (United States) **E Burgin**
- (Australia) **E Smylie**
**6**
3
**7**
