= Nathalie Ballet =

French tennis player

- Country (sports): France
- Born: 5 May 1967 (age 57)
- Prize money: $17,506

Singles
- Career record: 43–64
- Highest ranking: No. 407 (20 November 1989)

Doubles
- Career record: 44–46
- Career titles: 2 ITF
- Highest ranking: No. 185 (27 January 1992)

Nathalie Ballet (born 5 May 1967) is a French former professional tennis player.

Ballet started on tour in the late 1980s and On 20 November 1989, she reached her highest WTA singles rankings of 407 and best doubles rankings of 185.

Her only WTA Tour main-draw appearance came at the 1992 Belgian Open where she partnered Agnes Romand in the doubles event. They lost in the First Round to Belgian Laurence Courtois and Belgian Nancy Feber.

== ITF finals ==
=== Singles (0–1) ===
$25,000 tournaments
$10,000 tournaments

Outcome	No.	Date	Tournament	Surface	Opponent0	Score
Runner-up	1.	24 July 1989	Subiaco, Italy	Clay	(Russia) Eugenia Maniokova	3–6, 2–6

=== Doubles (2–6) ===
Outcome	No.	Date	Tournament	Surface	Partner	Opponents	Score
Runner-up	1.	21 July 1986	Subiaco, Italy	Hard	(France) Karine Quentrec	(Italy) Stefania Dalla Valle (Italy) Linda Ferrando	2–6, 6–0, 1–6
Winner	2.	13 March 1988	Valencia, Spain	Clay	(United States) Vincenza Procacci	(Spain) Penelope Fas (Spain) Sonsoles Hurtado	4–6, 6–3, 6–2
Runner-up	3.	25 September 1989	Caltagirone, Italy	Clay	(Italy) Giovanna Carotenuto	(Italy) Cristina Salvi (Italy) Alessia Vesuvio	5–7, 1–6
Runner-up	4.	23 July 1990	Milan, Italy	Hard	(France) Agnes Romand	(Italy) Silvia Farina Elia (Italy) Simona Isidori	6–2, 1–6, 3–6
Runner-up	5.	29 April 1991	Barcelona, Spain	Clay	(France) Agnes Romand	(Czech Republic) Jitka Dubcová (Netherlands) Yvonne Grubben	3–6, 3–6
Runner-up	6.	6 May 1991	Lerida, Spain	Clay	(France) Agnes Romand	(Czech Republic) Jitka Dubcová (Switzerland) Natalie Tschan	0–6, 3–6
Winner	7.	21 July 1991	Subiaco, Italy	Clay	(Netherlands) Claire Wegink	(Sweden) Sofia Hiort (Finland) Marja-Liisa Kuurne	6–2, 6–3
Runner-up	8.	20 July 1992	Subiaco, Italy	Clay	(Switzerland) Joana Manta	(Czech Republic) Martina Hautová (Slovenia) Karin Lušnic	1–6, 6–2, 2–6
