= 1989 Wimbledon Championships – Men's doubles qualifying =

Men's doubles qualifying
- 1989 Wimbledon Championships

Events
Singles	men	women		boys	girls
Doubles	men	women	mixed	boys	girls
WC Singles	men	women	quad
WC Doubles	men	women	quad
Legends	men	women	seniors

Qualification
Singles	men	women
Doubles	men	women	mixed
- Wimbledon Championships

Players and pairs who neither have high enough rankings nor receive wild cards may participate in a qualifying tournament held one week before the annual Wimbledon Tennis Championships.

== Seeds ==
1. (France) Guillaume Raoux / (France) Éric Winogradsky (qualified)
2. (United States) Luke Jensen / (United States) Richey Reneberg (second round)
3. (Canada) Martin Laurendeau / (United States) Leif Shiras (second round)
4. (India) Zeeshan Ali / (United States) Jonathan Canter (qualified)
5. (Australia) Jason Stoltenberg / (Australia) Todd Woodbridge (qualifying competition)
6. (United States) Dan Cassidy / (United States) Jeff Klaparda (second round)
7. (Chile) Ricardo Acuña / (South Africa) Royce Deppe (first round)
8. (Australia) Brett Custer / (Australia) David Macpherson (first round)
9. (New Zealand) Steve Guy / (United States) Jared Palmer (first round)
10. (United States) Peter Palandjian / (United States) Larry Scott (first round)

== Qualifiers ==
1. (France) Guillaume Raoux / (France) Éric Winogradsky
2. (United States) Brian Page / (United States) Scott Warner
3. (Brazil) José Daher / (Brazil) Fernando Roese
4. (India) Zeeshan Ali / (United States) Jonathan Canter
5. (South Africa) Lan Bale / (Romania) Mihnea-Ion Năstase

== Qualifying draw ==
=== First qualifier ===
First round
1	(France) Guillaume Raoux (France) Éric Winogradsky	7^{8}	6
WC	(United Kingdom) Mark Blincow (United Kingdom) Andrew Sproule	6^{6}	4
(South Africa) Clinton Banducci (South Africa) Earl Zinn	7	6^{6}	3
(South Africa) Warren Green (South Africa) Brian Levine	5	7^{8}	6
(United States) Joe DeFoor (United States) Kent Kinnear	7^{9}	6
(United States) Charles Merzbacher (Japan) Hitoshi Shirato	6^{7}	4
(South Africa) Piet Norval (South Africa) Byron Talbot	7	6
10	(United States) Peter Palandjian (United States) Larry Scott	5	4

Second round
1	(France) Guillaume Raoux (France) Éric Winogradsky	4	6	6
(South Africa) Warren Green (South Africa) Brian Levine	6	1	2
(United States) Joe DeFoor (United States) Kent Kinnear	4	4
(South Africa) Piet Norval (South Africa) Byron Talbot	6	6

Qualifying competition
1	(France) Guillaume Raoux (France) Éric Winogradsky
(South Africa) Piet Norval (South Africa) Byron Talbot	w/o

=== Second qualifier ===
First round
2	(United States) Luke Jensen (United States) Richey Reneberg	7^{8}	6
(United States) Arkie Engle (United States) Brett Buffington	6^{6}	4
(United States) Brian Page (United States) Scott Warner	6	6
Alt	(Australia) Johan Anderson (Australia) Peter Carter	3	4
(Denmark) Morten Christensen (Republic of Ireland) Peter Wright	6^{3}	3
(Soviet Union) Andrei Cherkasov (Soviet Union) Andrei Olhovskiy	7^{7}	6
WC	(United Kingdom) Paul Hand (United Kingdom) David Ison	6	7^{7}
8	(Australia) Brett Custer (Australia) David Macpherson	4	6^{5}

Second round
2	(United States) Luke Jensen (United States) Richey Reneberg	6	6^{4}	2
(United States) Brian Page (United States) Scott Warner	4	7^{7}	6
(Soviet Union) Andrei Cherkasov (Soviet Union) Andrei Olhovskiy	3
WC	(United Kingdom) Paul Hand (United Kingdom) David Ison	0^{r}

Qualifying competition
(United States) Brian Page (United States) Scott Warner	6	7	6
(Soviet Union) Andrei Cherkasov (Soviet Union) Andrei Olhovskiy	2	5	4

=== Third qualifier ===
First round
3	(Canada) Martin Laurendeau (United States) Leif Shiras	6	6
(Brazil) Nelson Aerts (Israel) Michael Daniel	4	4
WC	(United Kingdom) Mark Petchey (United Kingdom) Danny Sapsford	2	7^{7}	7
(Brazil) José Daher (Brazil) Fernando Roese	6	6^{5}	9
(United States) Kevin Lubbers (United States) Robert Pellizzi	6	6^{5}	4
(West Germany) Andreas Maurer (West Germany) Harald Rittersbacher	3	7^{7}	6
(United States) Tom Mercer (South Africa) Michael Robertson	6^{4}	6	6
9	(New Zealand) Steve Guy (United States) Jared Palmer	7^{7}	3	3

Second round
3	(Canada) Martin Laurendeau (United States) Leif Shiras	6^{4}	5
(Brazil) José Daher (Brazil) Fernando Roese	7^{7}	7
(West Germany) Andreas Maurer (West Germany) Harald Rittersbacher	6	6^{6}	8
(United States) Tom Mercer (South Africa) Michael Robertson	2	7^{8}	6

Qualifying competition
(Brazil) José Daher (Brazil) Fernando Roese	6	2	7^{8}	6^{8}	10
(West Germany) Andreas Maurer (West Germany) Harald Rittersbacher	4	6	6^{6}	7^{10}	8

=== Fourth qualifier ===
First round
4	(India) Zeeshan Ali (United States) Jonathan Canter	6	6
(India) Ashok Amritraj (India) Srinivasan Vasudevan	4	4
(Sweden) Henrik Holm (Sweden) Peter Nyborg	6	1	13
(United States) Kenny Thorne (United States) Bryan Shelton	4	6	15
(United States) Todd Nelson (United States) Phil Williamson	6	5	11
(United States) Mike Bauer (Australia) Steve Furlong	4	7	13
(United States) Bret Garnett (United States) Bill Scanlon	3	6	6
7	(Chile) Ricardo Acuña (South Africa) Royce Deppe	6	2	3

Second round
4	(India) Zeeshan Ali (United States) Jonathan Canter	7^{7}	6
(United States) Kenny Thorne (United States) Bryan Shelton	6^{2}	3
(United States) Mike Bauer (Australia) Steve Furlong	6^{8}	6^{3}
(United States) Bret Garnett (United States) Bill Scanlon	7^{10}	7^{7}

Qualifying competition
4	(India) Zeeshan Ali (United States) Jonathan Canter	7^{7}	6^{4}	6	6
(United States) Bret Garnett (United States) Bill Scanlon	6^{4}	7^{2}	2	4

=== Fifth qualifier ===
First round
5	(Australia) Jason Stoltenberg (Australia) Todd Woodbridge	6	6
(United States) Doug Flach (The Bahamas) Mark Knowles	3	4
(Socialist Federal Republic of Yugoslavia) Misel Klesinger (Sweden) Nicklas Kulti	6^{2}	6	4
(France) Arnaud Boetsch (France) Stéphane Grenier	7^{7}	4	6
(United States) Julian Barham (United States) John Sobel	1	3
(South Africa) Lan Bale (Romania) Mihnea-Ion Năstase	6	6
(Australia) Neil Borwick (South Africa) Charles Honey	3	4
6	(United States) Dan Cassidy (United States) Jeff Klaparda	6	6

Second round
5	(Australia) Jason Stoltenberg (Australia) Todd Woodbridge	7^{7}	6
(France) Arnaud Boetsch (France) Stéphane Grenier	6^{0}	4
(South Africa) Lan Bale (Romania) Mihnea-Ion Năstase	7^{7}	6^{4}	6
5	(United States) Dan Cassidy (United States) Jeff Klaparda	6^{5}	7^{7}	4

Qualifying competition
5	(Australia) Jason Stoltenberg (Australia) Todd Woodbridge	3	6	5	3
(South Africa) Lan Bale (Romania) Mihnea-Ion Năstase	6	3	7	6
