= 1988 Virginia Slims of Oklahoma – Doubles =

Doubles
- 1988 Virginia Slims of Oklahoma
- 1987 Champions: (Soviet Union) Svetlana Parkhomenko (Soviet Union) Larisa Savchenko

Final
- Champions: (Czechoslovakia) Jana Novotná (France) Catherine Suire
- Runners-up: (Sweden) Catarina Lindqvist (Denmark) Tine Scheuer-Larsen
- Score: 6–4, 6–4

Details
- Draw: 16
- Seeds: 4

Events
| Singles | Doubles |
| ← 1987 · | Virginia Slims of Oklahoma | · 1989 → |

Svetlana Parkhomenko and Larisa Savchenko were the defending champions but only Parkhomenko competed that year with Natalia Medvedeva.

Medvedeva and Parkhomenko lost in the first round to Catarina Lindqvist and Tine Scheuer-Larsen.

Jana Novotná and Catherine Suire won in the final 6–4, 6–4 against Lindqvist and Scheuer-Larsen.

== Seeds ==
Champion seeds are indicated in bold text while text in italics indicates the round in which those seeds were eliminated.

1. (United States) Lori McNeil / (United States) Betsy Nagelsen (semifinals)
2. (Czechoslovakia) **Jana Novotná** / (France) **Catherine Suire (champions)**
3. (Sweden) Catarina Lindqvist / (Denmark) Tine Scheuer-Larsen (final)
4. (Australia) Dianne Balestrat / (France) Catherine Tanvier (first round)

== Draw ==
=== Key ===
- Q = Qualifier
- WC = Wild card
- LL = Lucky loser
- Alt = Alternate
- SE = Special exempt
- PR = Protected ranking
- ITF = ITF entry
- JE = Junior exempt
- w/o = Walkover
- r = Retired
- d = Defaulted
- SR = Special ranking

First round
1 | (United States) **L McNeil** (United States) **B Nagelsen** | **6** | **6**
(United States) H Crowe (United States) W Wood | 0 | 2
(United States) **L Allen** (South Africa) **L Gregory** | 3 | **6** | **7**
(Italy) R Reggi (South Africa) D van Rensburg | **6** | 3 | 6
3 | (Sweden) **C Lindqvist** (Denmark) **T Scheuer-Larsen** | 5 | **6** | **6**
(Soviet Union) N Medvedeva (Soviet Union) S Parkhomenko | **7** | 4 | 2
(United States) **B Bowes** (United States) **K Horvath** | **6** | **6**
(United States) S Collins (United States) J Kaplan | 2 | 4
(United States) C Benjamin (United States) H Na | 2 | **6** | 4
(Australia) **L Field** (New Zealand) **J Richardson** | **6** | 0 | **6**
(Canada) **H Kelesi** (South Africa) **E Reinach** | **6** | **6**
4 | (Australia) D Balestrat (France) C Tanvier | 4 | 2
(United States) **Ca MacGregor** (United States) **Cy MacGregor** | **6** | **6**
(Socialist Federal Republic of Yugoslavia) S Goleš (France) N Herreman | 2 | 4
(West Germany) C Porwik (Sweden) M Lindström | 3 | 4
2 | (Czechoslovakia) **J Novotná** (France) **C Suire** | **6** | **6**

Quarterfinals
1 | (United States) **L McNeil** (United States) **B Nagelsen** | **6** | **6**
(United States) L Allen (South Africa) L Gregory | 3 | 3
3 | (Sweden) **C Lindqvist** (Denmark) **T Scheuer-Larsen** | **6** | **7**
(United States) B Bowes (United States) K Horvath | 1 | 5
(Australia) L Field (New Zealand) J Richardson | 1 | 5
(Canada) **H Kelesi** (South Africa) **E Reinach** | **6** | **7**
(United States) Ca MacGregor (United States) Cy MacGregor | 4 | 6
2 | (Czechoslovakia) **J Novotná** (France) **C Suire** | **6** | **7**

Semifinals
1 | (United States) L McNeil (United States) B Nagelsen | 1 | 5
3 | (Sweden) **C Lindqvist** (Denmark) **T Scheuer-Larsen** | **6** | **6**
(Canada) H Kelesi (South Africa) E Reinach | 1 | 2
(Czechoslovakia) **J Novotná** (France) **C Suire** | **6** | **6**

Final
3 | (Sweden) Catarina Lindqvist (Denmark) Tine Scheuer-Larsen | 4 | 4
2 | (Czechoslovakia) **Jana Novotná** (France) **Catherine Suire** | **6** | **6**
