= 1989 Virginia Slims of Oklahoma =

Women's tennis tournament

- Date: February 27 – March 5
- Edition: 4th
- Category: 2
- Draw: 32S / 16D
- Prize money: $100,000
- Surface: Hard / indoor
- Location: Oklahoma City, Oklahoma, U.S.
- Venue: The Greens Country Club

Champions

Singles
- (Netherlands) Manon Bollegraf

Doubles
- (United States) Lori McNeil / (United States) Betsy Nagelsen
← 1988 ·	Virginia Slims of Oklahoma	· 1990 →

The 1989 Virginia Slims of Oklahoma was a women's tennis tournament played on indoor hard courts at The Greens Country Club in Oklahoma City, Oklahoma in the United States and was part of the Category 2 tier of the 1989 Virginia Slims World Championship Series. It was the 4th edition of the tournament and ran from February 27 through March 5, 1989. Unseeded Manon Bollegraf won the singles title and earned $17,000 first-prize money.

== Finals ==
=== Singles ===
(Netherlands) Manon Bollegraf defeated (Soviet Union) Leila Meskhi 6–4, 6–4

- It was Bollegraf's only singles title of her career.

=== Doubles ===
(United States) Lori McNeil / (United States) Betsy Nagelsen defeated (United States) Elise Burgin / (Australia) Elizabeth Smylie by walkover

- It was McNeil's 1st title of the year and the 19th of her career. It was Nagelsen's 2nd title of the year and the 20th of her career.
