= Allison Cooper =

American tennis player

- Country (sports): United States
- Born: August 4, 1966 (age 58)

Singles
- Career record: 26–26
- Career titles: 1 ITF
- Highest ranking: No. 339 (August 20, 1990)

Doubles
- Career record: 23–17
- Career titles: 1 ITF
- Highest ranking: No. 249 (March 5, 1990)

Grand Slam doubles results
- US Open: 1R (1988)

Allison Cooper (born August 4, 1966) is an American former professional tennis player.

Cooper, a California native, played college tennis for the UCLA Bruins and won the 1988 NCAA Division I Women's Doubles Championship, partnering Stella Sampras. She and Sampras subsequently received entry into the doubles main draw at the 1988 US Open, where they came up against Louise Allen and Anna-Maria Fernandez for their first round match, which they lost in a third set tiebreak.

== ITF finals ==
Legend
$25,000 tournaments
$10,000 tournaments

=== Singles: 1 (1–0) ===
Result	No.	Date	Tournament	Surface	Opponent	Score
Win	1.	November 6, 1989	Nuriootpa, Australia	Hard	(Australia) Kristin Godridge	6–3, 2–6, 6–4

=== Doubles: 5 (1–4) ===
Result	No.	Date	Tournament	Surface	Partner	Opponents	Score
Win	1.	July 25, 1988	Caserta, Italy	Clay	(United States) Mary Norwood	(Italy) Simona Isidori (Switzerland) Cristina Casini	1–6, 7–6, 6–1
Loss	1.	August 8, 1988	Palermo, Italy	Clay	(United States) Mary Norwood	(Spain) Janet Souto (Spain) Rosa Bielsa	3–6, 6–2, 5–7
Loss	2.	July 2, 1989	Spartanburg, United States	Clay	(United States) Shawn Foltz	(United States) Lisa Bobby (United States) Jennifer Goodling	1–6, 3–6
Loss	3.	November 27, 1989	Melbourne, Australia	Hard	(Australia) Justine Hodder	(Australia) Danielle Jones (Hong Kong) Paulette Moreno	2–6, 2–6
Loss	4.	January 14, 1990	Midland, United States	Hard	(United States) Eleni Rossides	(United States) Pamela Jung (United States) Linley Tanner	3–6, 0–6
