= Valérie Batut =

Former professional tennis player

- Country (sports): France
- Born: 10 December 1969 (age 55)
- Prize money: $17,253

Singles
- Career record: 41–61
- Highest ranking: No. 243 (23 Jul 1990)

Grand Slam singles results
- French Open: Q2 (1989)
- Wimbledon: Q1 (1989, 1990)

Doubles
- Career record: 5–15
- Highest ranking: No. 552 (7 Jan 1991)

Valérie Batut (born 12 October 1969) is a French former professional tennis player.

Batut, a native of Gueugnon, reached a career high ranking of 243 while competing on the professional tour, with qualifying draw appearances to her name at the French Open and Wimbledon. She twice featured in the singles main draw of the Strasbourg WTA Tour tournament, where in 1990 she won her first round match over Jo-Anne Faull, who was at the time ranked in the world's top 100.

== ITF finals ==
=== Singles: 2 (0–2) ===
| Outcome | No. | Date | Tournament | Surface | Opponent | Score |
|---|---|---|---|---|---|---|
| Runner-up | 1. | 19 March 1989 | Ashkelon, Israel | Hard | (Netherlands) Marianne van der Torre | 6–2, 4–6, 4–6 |
| Runner-up | 2. | 29 October 1989 | Burgdorf, Switzerland | Carpet | (Soviet Union) Elena Brioukhovets | 4–6, 1–6 |
