= 1988 Virginia Slims of Oklahoma =

- Date: February 22–28
- Edition: 3rd
- Category: Category 2
- Draw: 32S / 16D
- Prize money: $100,000
- Location: Oklahoma City, Oklahoma, U.S.
- Venue: Greens Country Club

Champions

Singles
- (United States) Lori McNeil

Doubles
- (Czechoslovakia) Jana Novotná / (France) Catherine Suire
← 1987 ·	Virginia Slims of Oklahoma	· 1989 →

The 1988 Virginia Slims of Oklahoma was a women's tennis tournament played on indoor hard courts at the Greens Country Club in Oklahoma City, Oklahoma in the United States and was part of the Category 2 tier of the 1988 Virginia Slims World Championship Series. It was the third edition of the tournament and ran from February 22 through February 28, 1988. First-seeded Lori McNeil won the singles title.

== Finals ==
=== Singles ===
(United States) Lori McNeil defeated (Netherlands) Brenda Schultz 6–3, 6–2

- It was McNeil's 2nd title of the year and the 13th of her career.

=== Doubles ===
(Czechoslovakia) Jana Novotná / (France) Catherine Suire defeated (Sweden) Catarina Lindqvist / (Denmark) Tine Scheuer-Larsen 6–4, 6–4

- It was Novotná's 1st title of the year and the 4th of her career. It was Suire's 1st title of the year and the 4th of her career.
