= 1989 French Open – Women's singles qualifying =

Women's singles qualifying
- 1989 French Open

Events
Singles	men	women		boys	girls
Doubles	men	women	mixed	boys	girls
WC Singles	men	women	quad
WC Doubles	men	women	quad
Legends	−45	45+	women

Qualification
Singles	men	women
- French Open

Players who neither had high enough rankings nor received wild cards to enter the main draw of the annual French Open Tennis Championships participated in a qualifying tournament held in the week before the event.

== Seeds ==
1. (Czechoslovakia) Jana Pospíšilová (qualified)
2. (Brazil) Andrea Vieira (qualified)
3. (Australia) Janine Thompson (qualified)
4. (West Germany) Sabine Hack (qualified)
5. (Austria) Petra Schwarz (qualified)
6. (United States) Kim Kessaris (first round)
7. (Japan) Masako Yanagi (first round)
8. (France) Marie-Christine Damas (second round)
9. (Italy) Barbara Romanò (qualified)
10. (Czechoslovakia) Leona Lásková (qualifying competition, lucky loser)
11. (Australia) Elizabeth Minter (first round)
12. (Sweden) Cecilia Dahlman (second round)
13. (Netherlands) Carin Bakkum (first round)
14. (Belgium) Sabine Appelmans (first round)
15. (United Kingdom) Clare Wood (first round)
16. (Switzerland) Céline Cohen (first round)

== Qualifiers ==
1. (Czechoslovakia) Jana Pospíšilová
2. (Soviet Union) Natalia Medvedeva
3. (Australia) Janine Thompson
4. (Austria) Petra Schwarz
5. (Italy) Barbara Romanò
6. (West Germany) Sabine Hack
7. (Italy) Silvia La Fratta
8. (Brazil) Andrea Vieira

== Lucky losers ==
1. (Japan) Kimiko Date
2. (Czechoslovakia) Leona Lásková
3. (Czechoslovakia) Denisa Krajčovičová
4. (Spain) Inmaculada Varas
5. (Czechoslovakia) Regina Maršíková

== Qualifying draw ==
Key

- Q = Qualifier
- WC = Wild card
- LL = Lucky loser
- Alt = Alternate
- ITF = ITF entry
- PR = Protected ranking
- SR = Special ranking
- SE = Special exempt
- JE = Junior exempt
- JR = Junior Accelerator Programme entrant
- CO = College Accelerator Programme entrant
- NG = Next Gen Accelerator Program entrant
- w/o = Walkover
- r = Retired
- d = Defaulted

=== First qualifier ===
First round
1	(Czechoslovakia) Jana Pospíšilová	6	6
(Czechoslovakia) Hana Fukárková	1	1
WC	(France) Noëlle van Lottum	0	1
(Italy) Federica Bonsignori	6	6
(Argentina) Andrea Tiezzi	6	6^{5}	6
(Czechoslovakia) Michaela Frimmelová	1	7^{7}	1
WC	(France) Florence Gauvain	1	2
12	(Sweden) Cecilia Dahlman	6	6

Second round
1	(Czechoslovakia) Jana Pospíšilová	6	6
(Italy) Federica Bonsignori	2	2
(Argentina) Andrea Tiezzi	6	6
12	(Sweden) Cecilia Dahlman	3	3

Qualifying competition
1	(Czechoslovakia) Jana Pospíšilová	6	3	6
(Argentina) Andrea Tiezzi	4	6	0

=== Second qualifier ===
First round
10	(Czechoslovakia) Leona Lásková	4	6	6
(Sweden) Jonna Jonerup	6	4	3
(Austria) Heidi Sprung	2	6	4
(Italy) Stefania Dalla Valle	6	1	6
WC	(France) Céline Menain	3	3
(Soviet Union) Natalia Medvedeva	6	6
(Poland) Renata Baranski	6	6
7	(Japan) Masako Yanagi	2	2

Second round
10	(Czechoslovakia) Leona Lásková	6	1	12
(Italy) Stefania Dalla Valle	3	6	10
(Soviet Union) Natalia Medvedeva	6	6
(Poland) Renata Baranski	2	1

Qualifying competition
10	(Czechoslovakia) Leona Lásková	1	2
(Soviet Union) Natalia Medvedeva	6	6

=== Third qualifier ===
First round
3	(Australia) Janine Thompson	6	3	6
(Canada) Patricia Hy-Boulais	4	6	4
(West Germany) Christiane Hofmann	6	3	6
WC	(France) Megali Gence	4	6	4
(Australia) Kristine Kunce	6	6
(Sweden) Maria Ekstrand	1	2
(Japan) Kimiko Date	6	6
13	(Netherlands) Carin Bakkum	2	1

Second round
3	(Australia) Janine Thompson	6	6
(West Germany) Christiane Hofmann	2	3
(Australia) Kristine Kunce	1	2
(Japan) Kimiko Date	6	6

Qualifying competition
3	(Australia) Janine Thompson	6	7^{7}
(Japan) Kimiko Date	2	6^{3}

=== Fourth qualifier ===
First round
15	(United Kingdom) Clare Wood	4	4
(Spain) Inmaculada Varas	6	6
(South Africa) Linda Barnard	6	1	8
WC	(France) Valérie Batut	1	6	10
WC	(Netherlands) Hellas ter Riet	5	6	3
(Italy) Marzia Grossi	7	3	6
(Italy) Simona Isidori	2	2
5	(Austria) Petra Schwarz	6	6

Second round
(Spain) Inmaculada Varas	6	6
WC	(France) Valérie Batut	2	3
(Italy) Marzia Grossi	2	6^{5}
5	(Austria) Petra Schwarz	6	7^{7}

Qualifying competition
(Spain) Inmaculada Varas	1	0
5	(Austria) Petra Schwarz	6	6

=== Fifth qualifier ===
First round
8	(France) Marie-Christine Damas	6	6
(United States) Jeri Ingram	2	1
(Netherlands) Titia Wilmink	4	6^{5}
(Czechoslovakia) Regina Maršíková	6	7^{7}
(West Germany) Steffi Menning	3	6	3
(United States) Andrea Leand	6	4	6
(Argentina) Cristina Tessi	2	6	2
9	(Italy) Barbara Romanò	6	4	6

Second round
8	(France) Marie-Christine Damas	2	3
(Czechoslovakia) Regina Maršíková	6	6
(United States) Andrea Leand	4	6	3
9	(Italy) Barbara Romanò	6	1	6

Qualifying competition
(Czechoslovakia) Regina Maršíková	4	1
9	(Italy) Barbara Romanò	6	6

=== Sixth qualifier ===
First round
11	(Australia) Elizabeth Minter	6	2	2
WC	(France) Pretty Marot	3	6	6
(United States) Anna Ivan	6	6
WC	(France) Marie-Pierre Villani	2	2
(Bulgaria) Magdalena Maleeva	4	6	4
(Brazil) Luciana Corsato-Owsianka	6	0	6
(France) Catherine Bonnet	6	2	0
4	(West Germany) Sabine Hack	4	6	6

Second round
WC	(France) Pretty Marot	6	6^{1}	6
(United States) Anna Ivan	4	7^{7}	3
(Brazil) Luciana Corsato-Owsianka	3	3
4	(West Germany) Sabine Hack	6	6

Qualifying competition
WC	(France) Pretty Marot	0	1
4	(West Germany) Sabine Hack	6	6

=== Seventh qualifier ===
First round
6	(United States) Kim Kessaris	1	6	3
(South Africa) Mariaan de Swardt	6	3	6
(Spain) Janet Souto	1	3
(Italy) Silvia La Fratta	6	6
(France) Marie-Christine Calleja	1	6	8
(Finland) Petra Thorén	6	4	6
(United Kingdom) Amanda Grunfeld	7	6
14	(Belgium) Sabine Appelmans	5	4

Second round
(South Africa) Mariaan de Swardt	3	3
(Italy) Silvia La Fratta	6	6
(France) Marie-Christine Calleja	7	6
(United Kingdom) Amanda Grunfeld	5	1

Qualifying competition
(Italy) Silvia La Fratta	6	6
(France) Marie-Christine Calleja	1	4

=== Eighth qualifier ===
First round
16	(Switzerland) Céline Cohen	4	7	5
(Czechoslovakia) Denisa Krajčovičová	6	5	7
(Netherlands) Marianne van der Torre	2	7	12
(Spain) Rosa Bielsa	6	5	10
(United States) Amy Schwartz	2	6	6
(Switzerland) Michèle Strebel	6	3	1
(Sweden) Maria Lindström	6^{3}	4
2	(Brazil) Andrea Vieira	7^{7}	6

Second round
(Czechoslovakia) Denisa Krajčovičová	6	6
(Netherlands) Marianne van der Torre	4	4
(United States) Amy Schwartz	2	2
2	(Brazil) Andrea Vieira	6	6

Qualifying competition
(Czechoslovakia) Denisa Krajčovičová	2	2
2	(Brazil) Andrea Vieira	6	6
