= 1988 Virginia Slims of Oklahoma – Singles =

Singles
- 1988 Virginia Slims of Oklahoma
- 1987 Champion: (Australia) Elizabeth Smylie

Final
- Champion: (United States) Lori McNeil
- Runner-up: (Netherlands) Brenda Schultz
- Score: 6–3, 6–2

Details
- Draw: 32
- Seeds: 8

Events
Singles	Doubles
← 1987 ·	Virginia Slims of Oklahoma	· 1989 →

The following is the result of the 1988 Virginia Slims of Oklahoma singles.

Elizabeth Smylie was the defending champion but did not compete that year.

Lori McNeil won in the final 6–3, 6–2 against Brenda Schultz.

== Seeds ==
A champion seed is indicated in bold text while text in italics indicates the round in which that seed was eliminated.

1. (United States) **Lori McNeil (champion)**
2. (Bulgaria) Katerina Maleeva (first round)
3. (Italy) Raffaella Reggi (semifinals)
4. (Sweden) Catarina Lindqvist (semifinals)
5. (Australia) Dianne Balestrat (first round)
6. (Canada) Helen Kelesi (quarterfinals)
7. (Czechoslovakia) Jana Novotná (quarterfinals)
8. (United States) Kathleen Horvath (first round)

== Draw ==
=== Key ===
- Q = Qualifier
- WC = Wild card
- LL = Lucky loser
- Alt = Alternate
- SE = Special exempt
- PR = Protected ranking
- ITF = ITF entry
- JE = Junior exempt
- w/o = Walkover
- r = Retired
- d = Defaulted
- SR = Special ranking

First round
1	(United States) **L McNeil**	1	**6**	**6**
(France) C Tanvier	**6**	4	1
Q	(France) **C Suire**	**7**	**6**
(United States) B Bowes	5	2
Q	(South Africa) K Schimper	2	**6**	4
Q	(Soviet Union) **S Parkhomenko**	**6**	3	**6**
(United States) M Brown	3	1
6	(Canada) **H Kelesi**	**6**	**6**
4	(Sweden) **C Lindqvist**	**6**	**7**
(West Germany) C Porwik	2	5
(United Kingdom) S Gomer	1	**7**	6
(Socialist Federal Republic of Yugoslavia) **S Goleš**	**6**	6	**7**
(United States) **M Gurney**	**6**	**6**
(Poland) I Kuczyńska	4	2
(South Africa) **D Van Rensburg**	**7**	**7**
5	(Australia) D Balestrat	5	5
8	(United States) K Horvath	2	0
(South Africa) **E Reinach**	**6**	**6**
(United States) **H Na**	**6**	**6**
Q	(United States) S Sloane	3	4
(United States) B Nagelsen	2	**6**	2
(France) **N Herreman**	**6**	1	**6**
(Hong Kong) P Hy	6	4
3	(Italy) **R Reggi**	**7**	**6**
7	(Czechoslovakia) **J Novotná**	**6**	**6**
(United States) M Torres	2	3
(Czechoslovakia) **R Zrubáková**	**6**	**6**
(Sweden) M Lindström	2	3
(Netherlands) **B Schultz**	**6**	**6**
(Australia) L Field	4	3
(United States) **C Benjamin**	**6**	3	**6**
2	(Bulgaria) K Maleeva	4	**6**	1

Second round
1	(United States) **L McNeil**	**6**	**6**
Q	(France) C Suire	3	4
Q	(Soviet Union) S Parkhomenko	**7**	3	1
6	(Canada) **H Kelesi**	6	**6**	**6**
4	(Sweden) **C Lindqvist**	5	**6**	**6**
(Socialist Federal Republic of Yugoslavia) S Goleš	**7**	2	1
(United States) M Gurney	**6**	4	1
(South Africa) **D Van Rensburg**	4	**6**	**6**
(South Africa) **E Reinach**	**7**	**7**
(United States) H Na	5	6
(France) N Herreman	3	**6**	4
3	(Italy) **R Reggi**	**6**	0	**6**
7	(Czechoslovakia) **J Novotná**	**6**	**6**
(Czechoslovakia) R Zrubáková	2	3
(Netherlands) **B Schultz**	**7**	4	**6**
(United States) C Benjamin	6	**6**	2

Quarterfinals
1	(United States) **L McNeil**	**6**	**6**
6	(Canada) H Kelesi	3	4
4	(Sweden) **C Lindqvist**	3	**6**	**6**
(South Africa) D Van Rensburg	**6**	1	2
(South Africa) E Reinach	3	5
3	(Italy) **R Reggi**	**6**	**7**
7	(Czechoslovakia) J Novotná	4	**6**	6
(Netherlands) **B Schultz**	**6**	1	**7**

Semifinals
1	(United States) **L McNeil**	**6**	**6**
4	(Sweden) C Lindqvist	4	1
3	(Italy) R Reggi	6	3
(Netherlands) **B Schultz**	**7**	**6**

Final
1	(United States) **Lori McNeil**	**6**	**6**
(Netherlands) Brenda Schultz	3	2
