= Christiane Hofmann =

German tennis player

- Country (sports): West Germany; Germany
- Born: 12 December 1968 (age 57) Munich, West Germany
- Prize money: $44,746

Singles
- Career record: 88–84
- Career titles: 1 ITF
- Highest ranking: No. 170 (7 October 1991)

Grand Slam singles results
- French Open: Q2 (1989)
- Wimbledon: Q1 (1991)
- US Open: Q1 (1991)

Doubles
- Career record: 25–34
- Career titles: 0
- Highest ranking: No. 234 (8 July 1991)

Christiane Hofmann (born 12 December 1968) is a German former professional tennis player.

Born in Munich, Hofmann reached a best singles ranking of 170 in the world on the professional tour, winning one ITF title. She played in the qualifying draws of the French Open, at Wimbledon and the US Open.

Hofmann never made it past the first round of a WTA Tour singles tournament, but was a doubles semifinalist at Palermo in 1990, partnering Venezuelan's María Vento.

== ITF finals ==
$25,000 tournaments
$10,000 tournaments

=== Singles: 4 (1–3) ===
Result	No.	Date	Tournament	Surface	Opponent	Score
Win	1.	4 July 1988	ITF Cava de' Tirreni, Italy	Clay	(Italy) Katia Piccolini	6–1, 7–6
Loss	1.	10 June 1991	ITF Mantua, Italy	Clay	(France) Catherine Mothes-Jobkel	1–6, 0–6
Loss	2.	18 March 1996	ITF Bandar Seri Begawan, Brunei	Hard	(South Korea) Choi Young-ja	6–1, 1–6, 3–6
Loss	3.	29 July 1996	ITF Rabat, Morocco	Clay	(Germany) Inga Bertschmann	6–3, 0–6, 0–6

=== Doubles: 1 (0–1) ===
Result	No.	Date	Tournament	Surface	Partner	Opponents	Score
Loss	1.	18 July 1988	ITF Cava de' Tirreni, Italy	Clay	(Poland) Katarzyna Nowak	(Hungary) Virág Csurgó (Hungary) Réka Szikszay	1–6, 1–6
