= Stefania Dalla Valle =

Italian tennis player

- Country (sports): Italy
- Born: 12 July 1966 (age 58)
- Prize money: $19,045

Singles
- Career record: 61–48
- Highest ranking: No. 214 (18 Jul 1988)

Grand Slam singles results
- French Open: Q2 (1989)

Doubles
- Career record: 22–22
- Career titles: 1 ITF
- Highest ranking: No. 256 (12 Oct 1987)

Stefania Dalla Valle (born 12 July 1966) is an Italian former professional tennis player.

Dalla Valle competed on the professional tour in the 1980s and reached a career high single ranking of 214 in the world. All of her WTA Tour main draw appearances came in 1988, at the Athens Trophy, Belgian Open and Clarins Open. She featured in the qualifying draw for the 1989 French Open.

== ITF finals ==
Legend
$25,000 tournaments
$10,000 tournaments

=== Singles: 2 (0–2) ===
| Result | No. | Date | Tournament | Surface | Opponent | Score |
|---|---|---|---|---|---|---|
| Loss | 1. | 3 April 1988 | Rome, Italy | Clay | (Italy) Barbara Romanò | 3–6, 1–6 |
| Loss | 2. | 3 July 1988 | Maglie, Italy | Clay | (Greece) Olga Tsarbopoulou | 2–6, 6–2, 3–6 |

=== Doubles: 2 (1–1) ===
| Result | No. | Date | Tournament | Surface | Partner | Opponents | Score |
|---|---|---|---|---|---|---|---|
| Win | 1. | 27 July 1986 | Subiaco, Italy | Hard | (Italy) Linda Ferrando | (France) Nathalie Ballet (France) Karine Quentrec | 6–2, 0–6, 6–1 |
| Loss | 1. | 23 August 1987 | Lisbon, Portugal | Clay | (Austria) Bettina Diesner | (West Germany) Veronika Martinek (Hungary) Réka Szikszay | 6–7^{(4)}, 7–6^{(5)}, 6–7^{(5)} |
