= Simona Isidori =

Italian tennis player (born 1967)

- Country (sports): Italy
- Born: 10 October 1967 (age 57)
- Prize money: $27,797

Singles
- Career titles: 1 ITF
- Highest ranking: No. 195 (14 August 1989)

Grand Slam singles results
- Wimbledon: Q2 (1989)
- US Open: Q1 (1989)

Doubles
- Career titles: 3 ITF
- Highest ranking: No. 146 (17 September 1990)

Simona Isidori (born 10 October 1967) is an Italian former professional tennis player.

Isidori reached a career high singles ranking of 195. Her best WTA Tour performance was at the 1989 Spanish Open, where she won through to the second round. She featured in the qualifying draws for both Wimbledon and the US Open in 1989.

As a doubles player, she claimed two $25,000 ITF titles, both in 1990 partnering Silvia Farina Elia.

== ITF finals ==
$25,000 tournaments
$10,000 tournaments

=== Singles: 2 (1–1) ===
Result	No.	Date	Tournament	Surface	Opponent	Score
Win	1.	15 August 1988	Caltagirone, Italy	Clay	(Italy) Caterina Nozzoli	6-4 7-5
Loss	1.	31 July 1989	Vigo, Spain	Clay	(France) Catherine Mothes-Jobkel	6–4, 6–3

=== Doubles: 5 (3–2) ===
Result	No.	Date	Tournament	Surface	Partner	Opponents	Score
Win	1.	20 July 1987	Sezze, Italy	Clay	(Switzerland) Cristina Casini	(France) Federika Hugonnet (France) Nathalie Guerrée-Spitzer	6–2, 6–1
Loss	1.	25 July 1988	Francavilla, Italy	Clay	(Switzerland) Cristina Casini	(United States) Allison Cooper (United States) Mary Norwood	6–1, 6–7, 1–6
Win	2.	11 June 1990	Modena, Italy	Hard	(Italy) Silvia Farina Elia	(Netherlands) Heleen van den Berg (Netherlands) Miriam Oremans	6–2, 6–3
Loss	2.	25 June 1990	Caltagirone, Italy	Clay	(Italy) Caterina Nozzoli	(United States) Jennifer Fuchs (Japan) Ei Iida	1–6, 1–6
Win	3.	23 July 1990	Milan, Italy	Hard	(Italy) Silvia Farina Elia	(France) Nathalie Ballet (France) Agnes Romand	2–6, 6–1, 6–3
