= 1989 Virginia Slims of Oklahoma – Singles =

Singles
- 1989 Virginia Slims of Oklahoma
- 1988 Champion: (United States) Lori McNeil

Final
- Champion: (Netherlands) Manon Bollegraf
- Runner-up: (Soviet Union) Leila Meskhi
- Score: 6–4, 6–4

Details
- Draw: 32
- Seeds: 8

Events
Singles	Doubles
← 1988 ·	Virginia Slims of Oklahoma	· 1990 →

Lori McNeil was the defending champion but lost in the second round to Betsy Nagelsen.

Manon Bollegraf won in the final 6–4, 6–4 against Leila Meskhi.

== Seeds ==
A champion seed is indicated in bold text while text in italics indicates the round in which that seed was eliminated.

1. (United States) Lori McNeil (second round)
2. (Soviet Union) Larisa Savchenko (second round)
3. (Italy) Raffaella Reggi (semifinals)
4. (Soviet Union) Leila Meskhi (final)
5. (United States) Ann Grossman (second round)
6. (United States) Amy Frazier (quarterfinals)
7. (Australia) Dianne Balestrat (second round)
8. (Japan) Etsuko Inoue (semifinals)

== Draw ==
=== Key ===
- Q = Qualifier
- WC = Wild card
- LL = Lucky loser
- Alt = Alternate
- SE = Special exempt
- PR = Protected ranking
- ITF = ITF entry
- JE = Junior exempt
- w/o = Walkover
- r = Retired
- d = Defaulted
- SR = Special ranking

First round
1	(United States) **L McNeil**	**6**	**7**
(Japan) N Miyagi	4	6
(United States) **B Nagelsen**	**6**	**6**
(United States) H Na	4	1
Q	(United States) **D Spence**	**6**	6	**7**
(Netherlands) H Witvoet	0	**7**	5
(France) A Dechaume	6	2
8	(Japan) **E Inoue**	**7**	**6**
4	(Soviet Union) **L Meskhi**	**6**	**6**
(United Kingdom) M Javer	3	1
(United States) **M Werdel**	**6**	**6**
(Japan) A Kijimuta	3	2
(France) **N Herreman**	**6**	**6**
Q	(France) M-C Calleja	2	3
Q	(Japan) Y Koizumi	5	4
6	(United States) **A Frazier**	**7**	**6**
7	(Australia) **D Balestrat**	**6**	**6**
(United States) E Burgin	3	2
(Canada) **C Bassett-Seguso**	**6**	**6**
(United States) R Reis	3	2
(Switzerland) E Krapl	2	0
(United States) **M Van Nostrand**	**6**	**6**
(Australia) E Smylie	**7**	2	4
3	(Italy) **R Reggi**	5	**6**	**6**
5	(United States) **A Grossman**	**6**	**6**
LL	(United States) A Leand	3	3
(United States) M McGrath	4	2
(West Germany) **C Porwik**	**6**	**6**
(France) C Suire	6	**6**	5
(Netherlands) **M Bollegraf**	**7**	2	**7**
Q	(Netherlands) S Schilder	3	5
2	(Soviet Union) **L Savchenko**	**6**	**7**

Second round
1	(United States) L McNeil	4	**6**	4
(United States) **B Nagelsen**	**6**	2	**6**
Q	(United States) D Spence	3	2	r
8	(Japan) **E Inoue**	**6**	**1**
4	(Soviet Union) **L Meskhi**	**7**	**7**
(United States) M Werdel	6	6
(France) N Herreman	6	3
6	(United States) **A Frazier**	**7**	**6**
7	(Australia) D Balestrat	2	**6**	3
(Canada) **C Bassett-Seguso**	**6**	1	**6**
(United States) M Van Nostrand	3	**7**	4
3	(Italy) **R Reggi**	**6**	5	**6**
5	(United States) A Grossman	3	4
(West Germany) **C Porwik**	**6**	**6**
(Netherlands) **M Bollegraf**	3	**7**	**6**
2	(Soviet Union) L Savchenko	**6**	5	2

Quarterfinals
(United States) B Nagelsen	6	3
8	(Japan) **E Inoue**	**7**	**6**
4	(Soviet Union) **L Meskhi**	**6**	**7**
6	(United States) A Frazier	2	6
(Canada) C Bassett-Seguso	2	**6**	4/r
3	(Italy) **R Reggi**	**6**	4	**4**
(West Germany) C Porwik	**7**	3	3
(Netherlands) **M Bollegraf**	5	**6**	**6**

Semifinals
8	(Japan) E Inoue	0	2
4	(Soviet Union) **L Meskhi**	**6**	**6**
3	(Italy) R Reggi	3	5
(Netherlands) **M Bollegraf**	**6**	**7**

Final
4	(Soviet Union) Leila Meskhi	4	4
(Netherlands) **Manon Bollegraf**	**6**	**6**
