= 1990 Virginia Slims of Oklahoma =

- Date: February 19–25
- Edition: 5th
- Category: Tier IV
- Draw: 32S / 16D
- Prize money: $150,000
- Surface: Hard / indoor
- Location: Oklahoma City, OK, U.S.
- Venue: The Greens Country Club

Champions

Singles
- (United States) Amy Frazier

Doubles
- (United States) Mary-Lou Daniels / (United States) Wendy White
← 1989 ·	Virginia Slims of Oklahoma	· 1991 →

The 1990 Virginia Slims of Oklahoma was a women's tennis tournament played on indoor hard courts at The Greens Country Club in Oklahoma City, Oklahoma in the United States and was part of the Tier IV category of the 1990 WTA Tour. It was the fifth edition of the tournament and ran from February 19 through February 25, 1990. Third-seeded Amy Frazier won the singles title and earned $27,000 first-prize money.

== Finals ==
=== Singles ===
(United States) Amy Frazier defeated (Netherlands) Manon Bollegraf 6–4, 6–2

- It was Frazier's 1st title of the year and the 2nd of her career.

=== Doubles ===
(United States) Mary Lou Daniels / (United States) Wendy White defeated (Netherlands) Manon Bollegraf / (South Africa) Lise Gregory 7–5, 6–2
