= Rikki Gaddie =

South African tennis player

- Full name: Rikki Gaddie Dworcan
- Country (sports): South Africa
- Born: 2 September 1971 (age 55)
- Prize money: $44,192

Singles
- Career record: 68–104
- Career titles: 0
- Highest ranking: No. 265 (20 September 1993)

Grand Slam singles results
- Wimbledon: Q3 (1989)

Doubles
- Career record: 37–71
- Career titles: 0
- Highest ranking: No. 238 (4 July 1988)

Grand Slam doubles results
- Wimbledon: Q2 (1992)

Mixed doubles
- Career record: 0–1
- Career titles: 0

Grand Slam mixed doubles results
- French Open: 1R (1988)

Rikki Gaddie Dworcan (born 2 September 1971) is a South African former professional tennis player.

Gaddie featured in the mixed doubles main draw of the 1988 French Open, partnering Piet Norval. Her best singles performance in a grand slam tournament came at the 1989 Wimbledon Championships, where she made the third round of the qualifying draw.

Often during her doubles career on the professional tour she partnered with her younger sister Toni. The sisters now run the Champion Academy in Johannesburg, a personal development training academy for athletes and businesses.

== ITF finals ==
=== Doubles: 1 (0–1) ===
Result	Date	Tournament	Surface	Partner	Opponents	Score
Loss	24 May 1992	Haifa, Israel	Hard	(South Africa) Toni Gaddie	(South Africa) Michelle Anderson (Israel) Limor Zaltz	6–0, 3–6, 2–6
