= Lisa Gould =

British tennis player

- Country (sports): United Kingdom
- Born: 27 May 1967 (age 58)
- Plays: Right-handed
- Prize money: $24,423

Singles
- Career record: 26–67
- Highest ranking: No. 237 (11 Apr 1988)

Grand Slam singles results
- French Open: Q1 (1988)
- Wimbledon: 2R (1987)

Doubles
- Career record: 20–45
- Highest ranking: No. 275 (21 Dec 1986)

Grand Slam doubles results
- Wimbledon: Q1 (1986, 1990)

Lisa Green (née Gould; born 27 May 1967) is a British former professional tennis player.

Raised in Billericay, Essex, Gould competed on the professional tour in the 1980s and reached a career high singles ranking of 237 in the world. Most notably she won her first round match at the 1987 Wimbledon Championships, over Cammy MacGregor. She faced Peanut Louie Harper in the second round, with the winner to play top seed Martina Navratilova, but she fell in straight sets.

Gould married South African tennis player Warren Green and later relocated to Sydney, via South Africa. Their son, Chris Green, is a professional cricketer.
