= 1991 Virginia Slims of Oklahoma =

- Date: February 18–24
- Edition: 6th
- Category: Tier IV
- Draw: 32S / 16D
- Prize money: $150,000
- Surface: Hard / indoor
- Location: Oklahoma City, OK, U.S.
- Venue: The Greens Country Club

Champions

Singles
- (Czechoslovakia) Jana Novotná

Doubles
- (United States) Meredith McGrath / (United States) Anne Smith
← 1990 ·	Virginia Slims of Oklahoma	· 1992 →

The 1991 Virginia Slims of Oklahoma was a women's tennis tournament played on indoor hard courts at The Greens Country Club in Oklahoma City, Oklahoma in the United States that was part of Tier IV of the 1991 WTA Tour. It was the sixth edition of the tournament was held from February 18 through February 24, 1991. First-seeded Jana Novotná won the singles title and earned $27,000 first-prize money.

== Finals ==
=== Singles ===
(Czechoslovakia) Jana Novotná defeated (United States) Anne Smith 3–6, 6–3, 6–2

- It was Novotná's 2nd singles title of the year and the 5th of her career.

=== Doubles ===
(United States) Meredith McGrath / (United States) Anne Smith defeated (United States) Katrina Adams / (Canada) Jill Hetherington 6–2, 6–4
