= 1986 Virginia Slims of Oklahoma =

- Date: February 24 – March 2
- Edition: 1st
- Draw: 32S / 16D
- Prize money: $75,000
- Surface: Hard / indoor
- Location: Oklahoma City, Oklahoma, U.S.
- Venue: Summerfield Racquet Club

Champions

Singles
- (Netherlands) Marcella Mesker

Doubles
- (Netherlands) Marcella Mesker / (France) Pascale Paradis
Virginia Slims of Oklahoma	· 1987 →

The 1986 Virginia Slims of Oklahoma was a women's tennis tournament played on indoor hard courts at the Summerfield Racquet Club in Oklahoma City, Oklahoma in the United States and was part of the 1985 Virginia Slims World Championship Series. It was the inaugural edition of the tournament and ran from February 24 through March 2, 1986. Fifth-seeded Marcella Mesker won the singles title.

== Finals ==
=== Singles ===
(Netherlands) Marcella Mesker defeated (United States) Lori McNeil 6–4, 4–6, 6–3

- It was Mesker's only singles title of her career.

=== Doubles ===
(Netherlands) Marcella Mesker / (France) Pascale Paradis defeated (United States) Lori McNeil / (France) Catherine Suire 2–6, 7–6^{(7–1)}, 6–1
