= 1987 Virginia Slims of Oklahoma =

- Date: February 9–15
- Edition: 2nd
- Category: Category 1+
- Draw: 32S / 16D
- Prize money: $75,000
- Surface: Hard / indoor
- Location: Oklahoma City, Oklahoma, U.S.

Champions

Singles
- (Australia) Elizabeth Smylie

Doubles
- (Soviet Union) Svetlana Parkhomenko (Soviet Union) Larisa Savchenko
← 1986 ·	Virginia Slims of Oklahoma	· 1988 →

The 1987 Virginia Slims of Oklahoma was a women's tennis tournament played on indoor hard courts in Oklahoma City, Oklahoma in the United States and was part of the Category 1+ tier of the 1987 Virginia Slims World Championship Series. It was the second edition of the tournament and ran from February 9 through February 15, 1987. Fourth-seeded Elizabeth Smylie won the singles title.

== Finals ==
=== Singles ===
(Australia) Elizabeth Smylie defeated (United States) Lori McNeil 4–6, 6–3, 7–5

- It was Smylie's 1st singles title of the year and the 3rd of her career.

=== Doubles ===
(Soviet Union) Svetlana Parkhomenko / (Soviet Union) Larisa Savchenko defeated (United States) Lori McNeil / (United States) Kim Sands 6–4, 6–4

- It was Novotná's 1st title of the year and the 4th of her career. It was Suire's 1st title of the year and the 4th of her career.
