= Mary Norwood (tennis) =

American tennis player

- Full name: Mary Norwood Rompf
- Country (sports): United States
- Born: May 8, 1966 (age 60) Oklahoma City, Oklahoma
- Prize money: $25,505

Singles
- Career record: 32–32
- Highest ranking: No. 297 (July 31, 1989)

Grand Slam singles results
- Wimbledon: Q1 (1989)

Doubles
- Career record: 24–30
- Highest ranking: No. 98 (May 8, 1989)

Grand Slam doubles results
- French Open: 1R (1989)
- Wimbledon: 1R (1989)
- US Open: 1R (1983, 1989)

Grand Slam mixed doubles results
- Wimbledon: 1R (1989)

Mary Norwood Rompf (born May 8, 1966) is an American former professional tennis player.

Norwood, who was born and raised in Oklahoma, is the daughter of dermatologist O'Tar Norwood, who was considered a pioneer in the field of hair transplants. She never dropped a set during her high school tennis career and played collegiate tennis for the USC Trojans from 1985 to 1988. A two-time doubles All-American, Norwood was a member of USC's 1985 NCAA championship winning team, with the final against the Miami Hurricanes held on her home court in Oklahoma City.

Following her graduation from USC, Norwood competed on the professional tour and was ranked in the world's top 100 for doubles, peaking at 98 in 1989. As a singles player she had a best ranking of 297 and featured twice in the main draw of the Virginia Slims of Oklahoma, as well as the qualifiers of the 1989 Wimbledon Championships.

Her ex husband, Bill Rompf, was her childhood coach.

== ITF finals ==
Legend
$25,000 tournaments
$10,000 tournaments

=== Doubles: 2 (1–1) ===
Result	No.	Date	Tournament	Surface	Partner	Opponents	Score
Win	1.	July 25, 1988	Caserta, Italy	Clay	(United States) Allison Cooper	(Italy) Simona Isidori (Switzerland) Cristina Casini	1–6, 7–6, 6–1
Loss	2.	August 8, 1988	Palermo, Italy	Clay	(United States) Allison Cooper	(Spain) Janet Souto (Spain) Rosa Bielsa	3–6, 6–2, 5–7
