= Jennifer Santrock =

American tennis player

- Full name: Jennifer Jordan Santrock
- Country (sports): United States
- Born: February 26, 1969 (age 56) West Virginia, U.S.
- Plays: Left-handed
- Prize money: US$170,489

Singles
- Career record: 125–94
- Career titles: 0
- Highest ranking: No. 103 (February 15, 1993)

Grand Slam singles results
- Australian Open: 2R (1993)
- French Open: 2R (1990, 1993)
- Wimbledon: 1R (1990, 1992)
- US Open: 2R (1988)

Doubles
- Career record: 19–31
- Career titles: 0
- Highest ranking: No. 147 (April 27, 1992)

Grand Slam doubles results
- Australian Open: 1R (1993)
- French Open: 1R (1992)
- Wimbledon: 1R (1992)
- US Open: 1R (1992)

Jennifer Jordan Santrock (born February 26, 1969) is a former professional tennis player from the United States.

== Biography ==
Santrock was born in West Virginia and grew up in Texas, attending Plano Senior High School. Playing college tennis at Southern Methodist University from 1986 to 1989, Santrock was named All-American on four occasions. She was runner-up to Stanford's Sandra Birch in the final of the 1989 NCAA singles championship.

From 1989 she competed as a professional on the WTA Tour and reached a best ranking of 103 in singles. At the 1990 Virginia Slims of Oklahoma, she was a quarterfinalist, beating world No. 29, Catarina Lindqvist along the way. Her Grand Slam tournament record includes main-draw appearances in all four tournaments, and three matches against Steffi Graf.

Santrock is now a real estate agent in San Antonio, Texas.
