= 1989 Mantegazza Cup – Doubles =

Doubles
- 1989 Mantegazza Cup
- 1988 Champions: (West Germany) Andrea Betzner (West Germany) Claudia Porwik

Final
- Champions: (Socialist Federal Republic of Yugoslavia) Sabrina Goleš (Argentina) Mercedes Paz
- Runners-up: (France) Sophie Amiach (France) Emmanuelle Derly
- Score: 6–2, 6–2

Events
Singles	Doubles
← 1988 ·	Mantegazza Cup	· 1990 →

Andrea Betzner and Claudia Porwik were the defending champions but did not compete that year.

Sabrina Goleš and Mercedes Paz won in the final 6–2, 6–2 against Sophie Amiach and Emmanuelle Derly.

== Seeds ==
Champion seeds are indicated in bold text while text in italics indicates the round in which those seeds were eliminated.

1. (Socialist Federal Republic of Yugoslavia) **Sabrina Goleš** / (Argentina) **Mercedes Paz (champions)**
2. (France) Sophie Amiach / (France) Emmanuelle Derly (final)
3. (France) Julie Halard / (Belgium) Sandra Wasserman (first round)
4. (France) Frédérique Martin / (Italy) Caterina Nozzoli (quarterfinals)

== Draw ==
=== Key ===
- Q = Qualifier
- WC = Wild card
- LL = Lucky loser
- Alt = Alternate
- SE = Special exempt
- PR = Protected ranking
- ITF = ITF entry
- JE = Junior exempt
- w/o = Walkover
- r = Retired
- d = Defaulted
- SR = Special ranking

First round

Quarterfinals

Semifinals

Final

1
(Socialist Federal Republic of Yugoslavia) **S Goleš**
(Argentina) **M Paz**
**7**
**7**

- (Italy) L Garrone
- (Italy) L Golarsa
6
5

1
(Socialist Federal Republic of Yugoslavia) **S Goleš**
(Argentina) **M Paz**
**6**
**6**

- (Italy) G Greco
- (Italy) D Russino
2
1

- (Italy) M Grossi
- (Italy) B Romanò
0
3

- (Italy) **M Grossi**
- (Italy) **B Romanò**
**6**
**6**

1
(Socialist Federal Republic of Yugoslavia) **S Goleš**
(Argentina) **M Paz**
**6**
**6**

3
- (France) J Halard
- (Belgium) S Wasserman
3
6

- (Australia) K McDonald
- (Australia) K Radford
2
4

- (Australia) **K McDonald**
- (Australia) **K Radford**
**6**
**7**

- (Australia) **K McDonald**
- (Australia) **K Radford**
6
**6**
**6**

- (Switzerland) **C Cohen**
- (France) **M Jacquet**
**6**
**7**

- (Switzerland) C Cohen
- (France) M Jacquet
**7**
2
2

- (Italy) C Caverzasio
- (Italy) L Lapi
0
6

1
(Socialist Federal Republic of Yugoslavia) **Sabrina Goleš**
(Argentina) **Mercedes Paz**
**6**
**6**

- (Brazil) **L Corsato-Owsianka**
- (Brazil) **N Dias**
**6**
4
**6**

2
- (France) Sophie Amiach
- (France) Emmanuelle Derly
2
2

- (Argentina) G Mosca
- (Brazil) L Tella
3
**6**
4

- (Brazil) **L Corsato-Owsianka**
- (Brazil) **N Dias**
**6**
**6**

- (France) M Laval
- (France) N van Lottum
4
**7**
4

4
- (France) F Martin
- (Italy) C Nozzoli
2
3

4
- (France) **F Martin**
- (Italy) **C Nozzoli**
**6**
5
**6**

- (Brazil) L Corsato-Owsianka
- (Brazil) N Dias
2
2

- (Austria) H Sprung
- (Greece) O Tsarbopoulou
**7**
4
2

2
- (France) **S Amiach**
- (France) **E Derly**
**6**
**6**

- (Australia) **M Bowrey**
- (Sweden) **M Ekstrand**
6
**6**
**6**

- (Australia) M Bowrey
- (Sweden) M Ekstrand
0
4

- (France) P Etchemendy
- (France) K Quentrec
1
0

2
- (France) **S Amiach**
- (France) **E Derly**
**6**
**6**

2
- (France) **S Amiach**
- (France) **E Derly**
**6**
**6**
