= 1989 Mantegazza Cup – Singles =

Singles
- 1989 Mantegazza Cup
- 1988 Champion: (Canada) Helen Kelesi

Final
- Champion: (France) Karine Quentrec
- Runner-up: (Italy) Cathy Caverzasio
- Score: 6–3, 5–7, 6–3

Details
- Draw: 32
- Seeds: 8

Events
Singles	Doubles
← 1988 ·	Mantegazza Cup	· 1990 →

Helen Kelesi was the defending champion but did not compete that year.

Karine Quentrec won in the final 6–3, 5–7, 6–3 against Cathy Caverzasio.

== Seeds ==
A champion seed is indicated in bold text while text in italics indicates the round in which that seed was eliminated.

1. (Brazil) Neige Dias (semifinals)
2. (Argentina) Mercedes Paz (quarterfinals)
3. (Belgium) Sandra Wasserman (first round)
4. (Italy) Laura Lapi (first round)
5. (Italy) Laura Garrone (second round)
6. (Italy) Laura Golarsa (quarterfinals)
7. (Socialist Federal Republic of Yugoslavia) Sabrina Goleš (semifinals)
8. (France) Julie Halard (first round)

== Draw ==
=== Key ===
- Q = Qualifier
- WC = Wild card
- LL = Lucky loser
- Alt = Alternate
- SE = Special exempt
- PR = Protected ranking
- ITF = ITF entry
- JE = Junior exempt
- w/o = Walkover
- r = Retired
- d = Defaulted
- SR = Special ranking

First round
1	(Brazil) **N Dias**	**6**	**6**
(Australia) J Tremelling	4	3
LL	(Argentina) G Mosca	**7**	3	2
(Switzerland) **C Cohen**	5	**6**	**6**
(Czechoslovakia) E Švíglerová	5	**7**	3
(Brazil) **L Corsato-Owsianka**	**7**	6	**6**
Q	(Austria) S Dopfer	5	1
5	(Italy) **L Garrone**	**7**	**6**
3	(Belgium) S Wasserman	**6**	4	4
(Italy) **S Farina**	1	**6**	**6**
(Czechoslovakia) **L Lásková**	**6**	3	**6**
(Greece) O Tsarbopoulou	3	**6**	3
Q	(Argentina) C Tessi	5	5
(France) **K Quentrec**	**7**	**7**
Q	(Argentina) **F Labat**	**6**	**6**
8	(France) J Halard	4	3
6	(Italy) **L Golarsa**	**6**	**6**
(Italy) B Romanò	4	3
Q	(Italy) **F Romano**	5	**6**	**6**
(Czechoslovakia) M Frimmelová	**7**	3	0
(France) M Laval	6	6
(France) **P Etchemendy**	**7**	**7**
(Italy) **C Caverzasio**	**6**	**6**
4	(Italy) L Lapi	0	2
7	(Socialist Federal Republic of Yugoslavia) **S Goleš**	6	**6**	**6**
(France) S Amiach	**7**	1	2
(Switzerland) S Jaquet	4	2
(United Kingdom) **A Grunfeld**	**6**	**6**
(Italy) K Piccolini	**6**	4	3
LL	(Italy) **M Grossi**	3	**6**	**6**
(France) E Derly	5	6
2	(Argentina) **M Paz**	**7**	**7**

Second round
1	(Brazil) **N Dias**	3	**6**	**6**
(Switzerland) C Cohen	**6**	2	1
(Brazil) **L Corsato-Owsianka**	**6**	**7**
5	(Italy) L Garrone	4	6
(Italy) **S Farina**	**6**	**6**
(Czechoslovakia) L Lásková	2	3
(France) **K Quentrec**	2	**6**	**7**
Q	(Argentina) F Labat	**6**	3	5
6	(Italy) **L Golarsa**	**7**	**6**
Q	(Italy) F Romano	5	4
(France) P Etchemendy	1	6
(Italy) **C Caverzasio**	**6**	**7**
7	(Socialist Federal Republic of Yugoslavia) **S Goleš**	**6**	5	**6**
(United Kingdom) A Grunfeld	3	**7**	4
LL	(Italy) M Grossi	6	0
2	(Argentina) **M Paz**	**7**	**6**

Quarterfinals
1	(Brazil) **N Dias**	**6**	**6**
(Brazil) L Corsato-Owsianka	2	3
(Italy) S Farina	4	**6**	4
(France) **K Quentrec**	**6**	2	**6**
6	(Italy) L Golarsa	2	**7**	2
(Italy) **C Caverzasio**	**6**	5	**6**
7	(Socialist Federal Republic of Yugoslavia) **S Goleš**	**6**	4	**7**
2	(Argentina) M Paz	3	**6**	5

Semifinals
1	(Brazil) N Dias	0	4
(France) **K Quentrec**	**6**	**6**
(Italy) **C Caverzasio**	**6**	**6**
7	(Socialist Federal Republic of Yugoslavia) S Goleš	3	0

Final
(France) **Karine Quentrec**	**6**	5	**6**
(Italy) Cathy Caverzasio	3	**7**	3
