= 1991 Lipton International Players Championships – Women's singles =

Women's singles
- 1991 Lipton International Players Championships

Final
- Champion: (Socialist Federal Republic of Yugoslavia) Monica Seles
- Runner-up: (Argentina) Gabriela Sabatini
- Score: 6–3, 7–5

Details
- Draw: 96
- Seeds: 32

Events
Singles	men	women
Doubles	men	women
← 1990 ·	Miami Open	· 1992 →

Defending champion Monica Seles defeated Gabriela Sabatini in the final, 6–3, 7–5 to win the women's singles tennis title at the 1991 Miami Open.

== Seeds ==
All seeds received a bye into the second round.

1. (Germany) Steffi Graf (semifinals)
2. (Socialist Federal Republic of Yugoslavia) Monica Seles (champion)
3. (Argentina) Gabriela Sabatini (final)
4. (United States) Mary Joe Fernández (semifinals)
5. (United States) Zina Garrison-Jackson (quarterfinals)
6. (United States) Jennifer Capriati (quarterfinals)
7. (Switzerland) Manuela Maleeva-Fragniere (quarterfinals)
8. (Soviet Union) Natasha Zvereva (second round)
9. (Austria) Barbara Paulus (fourth round)
10. (France) Nathalie Tauziat (fourth round)
11. (Canada) Helen Kelesi (second round)
12. (United States) Amy Frazier (third round)
13. (Peru) Laura Gildemeister (third round)
14. (South Africa) Rosalyn Fairbank-Nideffer (second round)
15. (Japan) Naoko Sawamatsu (third round)
16. (Italy) Raffaella Reggi (fourth round)
17. (United States) Lori McNeil (third round)
18. (Netherlands) Manon Bollegraf (second round)
19. (Sweden) Catarina Lindqvist (second round)
20. (United States) Susan Sloane (second round)
21. (United States) Gretchen Magers (third round)
22. (Czechoslovakia) Regina Rajchrtová (fourth round)
23. (United States) Meredith McGrath (third round)
24. (United States) Carrie Cunningham (second round)
25. (Australia) Julie Halard (second round)
26. (United States) Ann Grossman (third round)
27. (United States) Marianne Werdel (fourth round)
28. (Switzerland) Cathy Caverzasio (second round)
29. (Germany) Wiltrud Probst (second round)
30. (Czechoslovakia) Eva Švíglerová (third round)
31. (United States) Stephanie Rehe (second round)
32. (Australia) Elizabeth Smylie (third round)

Click on the seed number of a player to go to their draw section.

== Draw ==
=== Key ===
- Q = Qualifier
- WC = Wild card
- LL = Lucky loser
- Alt = Alternate
- SE = Special exempt
- PR = Protected ranking
- ITF = ITF entry
- JE = Junior exempt
- w/o = Walkover
- r = Retired
- d = Defaulted
- SR = Special ranking

=== Finals ===
Quarterfinals
1	(Germany) Steffi Graf	6	6
7	(Switzerland) Manuela Maleeva-Fragniere	1	3
3	(Argentina) Gabriela Sabatini	6	6
5	(United States) Zina Garrison-Jackson	3	2
WC	(United States) Ginger Helgeson	1	0
4	(United States) Mary Joe Fernández	6	6
6	(United States) Jennifer Capriati	6	1	4
2	(Socialist Federal Republic of Yugoslavia) Monica Seles	2	6	6

Semifinals
1	(Germany) Steffi Graf	6	6^{6}	1
3	(Argentina) Gabriela Sabatini	0	7^{8}	6
4	(United States) Mary Joe Fernández	1	3
2	(Socialist Federal Republic of Yugoslavia) Monica Seles	6	6

Final
3	(Argentina) Gabriela Sabatini	3	5
2	(Socialist Federal Republic of Yugoslavia) Monica Seles	6	7

=== Top half ===
==== Section 1 ====
First round
WC	(United States) E deLone	6	6
LL	(France) C Suire	0	3
(United States) C Benjamin	6	0	1
(United States) ML Daniels	2	6	6
(Bulgaria) M Maleeva	2	6	6
WC	(United States) Cam MacGregor	6	4	1
Q	(United Kingdom) C Wood	6	7
(Netherlands) P Kamstra	2	5

Second round
1	(Germany) S Graf	6	6
WC	(United States) E deLone	1	2
(United States) ML Daniels	5	4
21	(United States) G Magers	7	6
27	(United States) M Werdel	6	7
(Bulgaria) M Maleeva	2	5
(United Kingdom) C Wood	7	2	7
11	(Canada) H Kelesi	5	6	5

Third round
1	(Germany) S Graf	6	6
21	(United States) G Magers	3	0
27	(United States) M Werdel	6	6
(United Kingdom) C Wood	3	1

Fourth round
1	(Germany) S Graf	6	6
27	(United States) M Werdel	0	1

==== Section 2 ====
First round
(Soviet Union) L Neiland	6	6
(Czechoslovakia) K Habšudová	2	3
(Italy) L Ferrando	6	0	6
(Soviet Union) N Medvedeva	4	6	2
(United States) D Faber	6	7^{7}
(Bulgaria) E Pampoulova	3	6^{1}
(Netherlands) B Schultz	7^{11}	6
(United States) S Martin	6^{9}	4

Second round
16	(Italy) R Reggi	3	6	6
(Soviet Union) L Neiland	6	3	4
(Italy) L Ferrando	6	2	3
23	(United States) M McGrath	2	6	6
19	(Sweden) C Lindqvist	6	6^{5}	3
(United States) D Faber	2	7^{7}	6
(Netherlands) B Schultz	3	6^{5}
7	(Switzerland) M Maleeva-Fragniere	6	7^{7}

Third round
16	(Italy) R Reggi	1	6	6
23	(United States) M McGrath	6	1	0
(United States) D Faber	2	3
7	(Switzerland) M Maleeva-Fragniere	6	6

Fourth round
16	(Italy) R Reggi	0	4
7	(Switzerland) M Maleeva-Fragniere	6	6

==== Section 3 ====
First round
(United States) A Henricksson	6	6
Q	(United States) S Schefflin	4	1
WC	(United States) C Rubin	6	7
LL	(France) M Laval	4	5
Q	(New Zealand) C Toleafoa	6	6
WC	(Peru) P Vásquez	4	2
(Canada) P Hy	6	6
(United States) R White	2	0

Second round
3	(Argentina) G Sabatini	6	6
28	(United States) A Henricksson	1	1
WC	(United States) C Rubin	6	7
18	(Netherlands) M Bollegraf	4	5
25	(France) J Halard	6	1	5
Q	(New Zealand) C Toleafoa	2	6	7
(Canada) P Hy	3	4
10	(France) N Tauziat	6	6

Third round
3	(Argentina) G Sabatini	6	6
WC	(United States) C Rubin	1	3
Q	(New Zealand) C Toleafoa	2	6	2
10	(France) N Tauziat	6	3	6

Fourth round
3	(Argentina) G Sabatini	6	6
10	(France) N Tauziat	3	1

==== Section 4 ====
First round
(France) M Pierce	6	6
WC	(United States) M Louie Harper	2	0
(United Kingdom) S Loosemore	5	3
(Germany) B Rittner	7	6
(Japan) K Date	6^{7}	6	5
(United States) D Graham	7^{9}	3	7
(France) A Dechaume	4	7	4
(Japan) N Miyagi	6	5	6

Second round
14	(South Africa) R Fairbank-Nideffer	2	6^{6}
(France) M Pierce	6	7^{8}
(Germany) B Rittner	7^{7}	6
29	(Germany) W Probst	6^{2}	2
32	(Australia) E Smylie	6	3	6
(United States) D Graham	3	6	3
(Japan) N Miyagi	7	4	5
5	(United States) Z Garrison-Jackson	5	6	7

Third round
(France) M Pierce	6	6
(Germany) B Rittner	3	2
32	(Australia) E Smylie	4	1
5	(United States) Z Garrison-Jackson	6	6

Fourth round
(France) M Pierce	3	4
5	(United States) Z Garrison-Jackson	6	6

=== Bottom half ===
==== Section 5 ====
First round
(United Kingdom) J Durie	3	3
WC	(United States) G Helgeson	6	6
(United States) T Whitlinger	6	6
LL	(Belgium) S Wasserman	3	0
(Japan) T Takagi	3	2
(United Kingdom) M Javer	6	6
Q	(Finland) P Thorén	6	2	6^{6}
(Austria) M Maruska	3	6	7^{8}

Second round
8	(Soviet Union) N Zvereva	2	3
WC	(United States) G Helgeson	6	6
(United States) T Whitlinger	7^{7}	5	4
30	(Czechoslovakia) E Švíglerová	6^{3}	7	6
22	(Czechoslovakia) R Rajchrtová	3	6	7
(United Kingdom) M Javer	6	4	5
(Austria) M Maruska	1	1
12	(United States) A Frazier	6	6

Third round
WC	(United States) G Helgeson	6	6
30	(Czechoslovakia) E Švíglerová	3	0
22	(Czechoslovakia) R Rajchrtová	7^{7}	2	6
12	(United States) A Frazier	6^{2}	6	4

Fourth round
WC	(United States) G Helgeson	4	6	6
22	(Czechoslovakia) R Rajchrtová	6	3	3

==== Section 6 ====
First round
(France) C Mothes	2	1
(Sweden) C Dahlman	6	6
Q	(Netherlands) M Oremans	3	5
(United States) P Shriver	6	7
(France) K Quentrec	3	6	7
(France) I Demongeot	6	3	5
(United States) K Rinaldi	6^{4}	3
(United States) A Keller	7^{7}	6

Second round
13	(Peru) L Gildemeister	6	6
(Sweden) C Dahlman	3	3
(United States) P Shriver	6	6
28	(Switzerland) C Caverzasio	1	4
17	(United States) L McNeil	6	7
(France) K Quentrec	3	5
(United States) A Keller	3	2
4	(United States) MJ Fernández	6	6

Third round
12	(Peru) L Gildemeister	3	2
(United States) P Shriver	6	6
17	(United States) L McNeil	1	2
4	(United States) MJ Fernández	6	6

Fourth round
(United States) P Shriver	2	4
4	(United States) MJ Fernández	6	6

==== Section 7 ====
First round
Q	(Israel) Y Segal	4	1
(United States) G Fernández	6	6
WC	(United States) L Bonder-Kreiss	1	5
(United States) S Smith	6	7
(Germany) C Porwik	7	6
(United States) L Harvey-Wild	5	2
(United Kingdom) S Gomer	6	6
(France) N Herreman	4	3

Second round
6	(United States) J Capriati	6	6
(United States) G Fernández	3	2
(United States) S Smith	5	4
26	(United States) A Grossman	7	6
31	(United States) S Rehe	6^{4}	1
(Germany) C Porwik	7^{7}	6
(United Kingdom) S Gomer	3	7	2
9	(Austria) B Paulus	6	5	6

Third round
6	(United States) J Capriati	d
26	(United States) A Grossman	5	2
(Germany) C Porwik	3	2
9	(Austria) B Paulus	6	6

Fourth round
6	(United States) J Capriati	6	6
9	(Austria) B Paulus	1	3

==== Section 8 ====
First round
(South Africa) A Coetzer	7	6
(Soviet Union) E Brioukhovets	5	4
Q	(France) N Housset	6^{4}	2
(Argentina) F Labat	7^{7}	6
Alt	(Canada) R Simpson-Alter	3	4
(Germany) K Kschwendt	6	6
(United States) P Fendick	4	3
(United States) H Cioffi	6	6

Second round
15	(Japan) N Sawamatsu	4	6	7
(South Africa) A Coetzer	6	2	5
(Argentina) F Labat	4	6	6
24	(United States) C Cunningham	6	4	0
20	(United States) S Sloane	6	1	4
(Germany) K Kschwendt	4	6	6
(United States) H Cioffi	1	3
2	(Socialist Federal Republic of Yugoslavia) M Seles	6	6

Third round
15	(Japan) N Sawamatsu	6	6^{5}	2
(Argentina) F Labat	1	7^{7}	6
(Germany) K Kschwendt	0	1
2	(Socialist Federal Republic of Yugoslavia) M Seles	6	6

Fourth round
(Argentina) F Labat	5	0
2	(Socialist Federal Republic of Yugoslavia) M Seles	7	6

== Qualifying ==
=== Seeds ===
1. (United States) Camille Benjamin (Promoted to Main Draw)
2. (United States) Renata Baranski (second round)
3. (Argentina) Bettina Fulco (second round)
4. (France) Nathalie Guerrée (first round)
5. (United Kingdom) Clare Wood (qualified)
6. (Germany) Eva Pfaff (second round)
7. (France) Maïder Laval (qualifying competition)
8. (Australia) Michelle Jaggard (second round)
9. (Belgium) Sandra Wasserman (qualified)
10. (United States) Hu Na (first round)
11. (Brazil) Cláudia Chabalgoity (second round)
12. (New Zealand) Claudine Toleafoa (qualified)
13. (France) Noëlle van Lottum (first round)
14. (France) Pascale Etchemendy (first round)
15. (Brazil) Andrea Vieira (first round)
16. (New Zealand) Julie Richardson (qualifying competition)

=== Qualifiers ===
1. (Canada) Rene Simpson-Alter
2. (United States) Stacey Schefflin
3. (France) Nathalie Housset
4. (New Zealand) Claudine Toleafoa
5. (United Kingdom) Clare Wood
6. (Israel) Yael Segal
7. (Netherlands) Miriam Oremans
8. (Finland) Petra Thorén

=== Key ===
- Q = Qualifier
- WC = Wild card
- LL = Lucky loser
- Alt = Alternate
- SE = Special exempt
- PR = Protected ranking
- ITF = ITF entry
- JE = Junior exempt
- w/o = Walkover
- r = Retired
- d = Defaulted
- SR = Special ranking

==== First qualifier ====
First round
(Denmark) Tine Scheuer-Larsen	2	7	1
(Canada) Rene Simpson-Alter	6	5	6
(United States) Luanne Spadea	6	7^{7}
(United States) Shawn Foltz	3	6^{4}
(France) Marie-Christine Damas	1	4
(France) Catherine Suire	6	6
(United States) Kim Steinmetz	6	3
10	(United States) Hu Na	1	0^{r}

Second round
(Canada) Rene Simpson-Alter	6	5	6
(United States) Luanne Spadea	4	7	1
(France) Catherine Suire	6	7^{11}
(United States) Kim Steinmetz	3	6^{9}

Qualifying competition
(Canada) Rene Simpson-Alter	6	6
(France) Catherine Suire	4	1

==== Second qualifier ====
First round
14	(France) Pascale Etchemendy	3	4
(Japan) Rika Hiraki	6	6
(United States) Michelle Jackson-Nobrega	6	3	6^{6}
(United States) Stacey Schefflin	3	6	7^{8}
(Spain) Pilar Pérez	6	6
(United States) Sandra Cacic	1	3
(France) Sophie Amiach	3	6^{6}
8	(Australia) Michelle Jaggard	6	7^{8}

Second round
(Japan) Rika Hiraki	6^{5}	7^{8}	6^{3}
(United States) Stacey Schefflin	7^{7}	6^{6}	7^{7}
(Spain) Pilar Pérez	6	2	7
8	(Australia) Michelle Jaggard	3	6	5

Qualifying competition
(United States) Stacey Schefflin	3	7^{7}	6
(Spain) Pilar Pérez	6	6^{4}	4

==== Third qualifier ====
First round
4	(France) Nathalie Guerrée	1	6	4
(Australia) Jo-Anne Faull	6	1	6
(Italy) Silvia La Fratta	4	3
(United States) Beverly Bowes	6	6
(France) Nathalie Housset	4	6	6
(South Africa) Lise Gregory	6	2	3
(Canada) Maureen Drake	6^{1}	7^{11}	6
15	(Brazil) Andrea Vieira	7^{7}	6^{9}	4

Second round
(Australia) Jo-Anne Faull	3	1
(United States) Beverly Bowes	6	6
(France) Nathalie Housset	6	7
(Canada) Maureen Drake	1	5

Qualifying competition
(United States) Beverly Bowes	4	7	5
(France) Nathalie Housset	6	5	7

==== Fourth qualifier ====
First round
12	(New Zealand) Claudine Toleafoa	7	6
(United States) Amy Schwartz	5	0
(United States) Akiko Gooden	7	6
(United States) Alysia May	5	3
(Germany) Anouschka Popp	7^{7}	6
(Canada) Jill Hetherington	6^{5}	4
(Belgium) Ann Devries	2	3
6	(Germany) Eva Pfaff	6	6

Second round
12	(New Zealand) Claudine Toleafoa	7	6
(United States) Akiko Gooden	5	2
(Germany) Anouschka Popp	3	6	6
6	(Germany) Eva Pfaff	6	4	4

Qualifying competition
12	(New Zealand) Claudine Toleafoa	6	6
(Germany) Anouschka Popp	2	2

==== Fifth qualifier ====
First round
5	(United Kingdom) Clare Wood	0	6	6
(United States) Niurka Sodupe	6	0	0
(France) Sandrine Testud	6	6
(Netherlands) Carin Bakkum	1	1
(Germany) Sabine Auer	6	4	6
(Netherlands) Hellas ter Riet	4	6	3
(United States) Anne Mall	6^{5}	7^{7}	6^{4}
(Belgium) Sandra Wasserman	7^{7}	6^{5}	7^{7}

Second round
5	(United Kingdom) Clare Wood	6	6
(France) Sandrine Testud	2	3
(Germany) Sabine Auer	6	5	2
(Belgium) Sandra Wasserman	3	7	6

Qualifying competition
5	(United Kingdom) Clare Wood	6	6
(Belgium) Sandra Wasserman	3	3

==== Sixth qualifier ====
First round
16	(New Zealand) Julie Richardson	6	6
(Netherlands) Caroline Vis	4	3
(Hungary) Petra Schmitt	3	6	7
(Australia) Rennae Stubbs	6	4	5
(Israel) Yael Segal	0	6	6
(France) Sybille Niox-Château	6	4	4
(United States) Kathy Jordan	2	6	5
3	(Argentina) Bettina Fulco	6	4	7

Second round
16	(New Zealand) Julie Richardson	6	6
(Hungary) Petra Schmitt	4	4
(Israel) Yael Segal	6	7
6	(Argentina) Bettina Fulco	2	6^{5}

Qualifying competition
16	(New Zealand) Julie Richardson	4^{r}
(Israel) Yael Segal	4

==== Seventh qualifier ====
First round
7	(France) Maïder Laval	4	6	7
(Indonesia) Suzanna Wibowo	6	4	5
(United States) Louise Allen	1	1
(United States) Katrina Adams	6	6
(Netherlands) Miriam Oremans	6	6
(United States) Elly Hakami	2	4
(United States) Pam Casale-Telford	2	4
11	(Brazil) Cláudia Chabalgoity	6	6

Second round
7	(France) Maïder Laval	4	6	6
(United States) Katrina Adams	6	2	3
(Netherlands) Miriam Oremans	7^{7}	6
11	(Brazil) Cláudia Chabalgoity	6^{2}	3

Qualifying competition
(France) Maïder Laval	1	2
(Netherlands) Miriam Oremans	6	6

==== Eighth qualifier ====
First round
13	(France) Noëlle van Lottum	4	6	4
(United States) Pam Nelson	6	1	6
(Finland) Petra Thorén	1	6	6
(United States) Elise Burgin	6	2	4
(United States) Sandy Collins	3	6	6
(Germany) Katharina Düll	6	3	0
(United States) Tammy Whittington	6	1	3
2	(United States) Renata Baranski	4	6	6

Second round
(United States) Pam Nelson	6^{1}	0
(Finland) Petra Thorén	7^{7}	6
(United States) Sandy Collins	7^{8}	6
2	(United States) Renata Baranski	6^{6}	0

Qualifying competition
(Finland) Petra Thorén	6	6
(United States) Sandy Collins	3	3
