= 1991 Trofeo Ilva-Coppa Mantegazza – Doubles =

Doubles
- 1991 Trofeo Ilva-Coppa Mantegazza

Final
- Champions: (France) Alexia Dechaume (Argentina) Florencia Labat
- Runners-up: (Italy) Laura Golarsa (United States) Ann Grossman
- Score: 6–2, 7–5

Details
- Draw: 16
- Seeds: 4

Events
Singles	Doubles
← 1990 ·	Ilva Trophy	· 1992 →

Elena Brioukhovets and Eugenia Maniokova were the defending champions, but Brioukhovets chose to compete at Hamburg during the same week. Maniokova teamed up with Radka Bobková and lost in the semifinals to Laura Golarsa and Ann Grossman.

Alexia Dechaume and Florencia Labat won the title by defeating Golarsa and Grossman 6–2, 7–5 in the final.

== Seeds ==
1. (Switzerland) Cathy Caverzasio / (France) Nathalie Herreman (semifinals)
2. (Italy) Laura Golarsa / (United States) Ann Grossman (final)
3. (France) Alexia Dechaume / (Argentina) Florencia Labat (champions)
4. (Czechoslovakia) Radka Bobková / (Soviet Union) Eugenia Maniokova (semifinals)

== Draw ==
=== Key ===
- Q = Qualifier
- WC = Wild card
- LL = Lucky loser
- Alt = Alternate
- SE = Special exempt
- PR = Protected ranking
- ITF = ITF entry
- JE = Junior exempt
- w/o = Walkover
- r = Retired
- d = Defaulted
- SR = Special ranking

=== Draw ===
First round
1	(Switzerland) C Caverzasio (France) N Herreman	6	4	6
(Australia) T Morton (France) N van Lottum	4	6	0
(Italy) F Romano (Netherlands) S Rottier	6	6
(Italy) G Pizzichini (Germany) Petra Studnička	3	1
3	(France) A Dechaume (Argentina) F Labat	6	6
(South Africa) R Gaddie (United States) C Kuhlman	1	0
(Brazil) C Chabalgoity (United States) L Glitz	4	7	6
(Italy) S Farina (Italy) R Grande	6	5	1
(Finland) N Dahlman (Greece) A Kanellopoulou	3	4
(Italy) K Piccolini (Switzerland) E Zardo	6	6
(Austria) M Maruska (Austria) P Ritter	3	3
4	(Czechoslovakia) R Bobková (Soviet Union) E Maniokova	6	6
(Italy) N Baudone (Italy) L Lapi	6	7
(Soviet Union) A Blumberga (Finland) P Thorén	1	5
(Netherlands) M Oremans (Netherlands) Lee-Ann van den Berg	3	6	3
2	(Italy) L Golarsa (United States) A Grossman	6	3	6

Quarterfinals
1	(Switzerland) C Caverzasio (France) N Herreman	6	6
(Italy) F Romano (Netherlands) S Rottier	1	1
3	(France) A Dechaume (Argentina) F Labat	6	6
(Brazil) C Chabalgoity (United States) L Glitz	0	2
(Italy) K Piccolini (Switzerland) E Zardo	4	2
4	(Czechoslovakia) R Bobková (Soviet Union) E Maniokova	6	6
(Italy) N Baudone (Italy) L Lapi	4	3
2	(Italy) L Golarsa (United States) A Grossman	6	6

Semifinals
1	(Switzerland) C Caverzasio (France) N Herreman	4	4
3	(France) A Dechaume (Argentina) F Labat	6	6
4	(Czechoslovakia) R Bobková (Soviet Union) E Maniokova	6	6^{5}	4
2	(Italy) L Golarsa (United States) A Grossman	4	7^{7}	6

Final
3	(France) A Dechaume (Argentina) F Labat	6	7
2	(Italy) L Golarsa (United States) A Grossman	2	5
