= 1990 Lipton International Players Championships – Women's singles =

Tennis event draw page

Women's singles
- 1990 Lipton International Players Championships

Final
- Champion: (Socialist Federal Republic of Yugoslavia) Monica Seles
- Runner-up: (Austria) Judith Wiesner
- Score: 6–1, 6–2

Details
- Draw: 96
- Seeds: 32

Events
Singles	men	women
Doubles	men	women
- Miami Open

Monica Seles defeated Judith Wiesner in the final, 6–1, 6–2 to win the women's singles tennis title at the 1990 Miami Open.

Gabriela Sabatini was the defending champion, but lost in the quarterfinals to Conchita Martínez.

== Seeds ==
All seeds received a bye to the second round.

1. (Argentina) Gabriela Sabatini (fourth round)
2. (United States) Zina Garrison-Jackson (second round)
3. (Socialist Federal Republic of Yugoslavia) Monica Seles (champion)
4. (Switzerland) Manuela Maleeva-Fragniere (quarterfinals)
5. (Spain) Conchita Martínez (semifinals)
6. (Czechoslovakia) Helena Suková (second round)
7. (Czechoslovakia) Jana Novotná (fourth round)
8. (Canada) Helen Kelesi (third round)
9. (France) Nathalie Tauziat (semifinals)
10. (Italy) Raffaella Reggi (fourth round)
11. (United States) Amy Frazier (second round)
12. (Peru) Laura Gildemeister (second round)
13. (South Africa) Rosalyn Fairbank-Nideffer (fourth round)
14. (United States) Gretchen Rush (fourth round)
15. (Austria) Judith Wiesner (final)
16. (United States) Anne Smith (second round)
17. (Sweden) Catarina Lindqvist (second round)
18. (Czechoslovakia) Radomira Zrubáková (second round)
19. (Soviet Union) Larisa Savchenko (second round)
20. (United States) Susan Sloane (fourth round)
21. (West Germany) Claudia Porwik (quarterfinal)
22. (France) Isabelle Demongeot (second round)
23. (West Germany) Sylvia Hanika (second round)
24. (New Zealand) Belinda Cordwell (second round)
25. (Australia) Anne Minter (second round)
26. (Hungary) Andrea Temesvári-Trunkos (second round)
27. (Netherlands) Manon Bollegraf (second round)
28. (United States) Betsy Nagelsen (second round)
29. (Czechoslovakia) Regina Rajchrtová (second round)
30. (United States) Patty Fendick (third round)
31. (United States) Kathy Rinaldi (third round)

== Draw ==
Key

- Q = Qualifier
- WC = Wild card
- LL = Lucky loser
- Alt = Alternate
- ITF = ITF entry
- PR = Protected ranking
- SR = Special ranking
- SE = Special exempt
- JE = Junior exempt
- JR = Junior Accelerator Programme entrant
- CO = College Accelerator Programme entrant
- NG = Next Gen Accelerator Program entrant
- w/o = Walkover
- r = Retired
- d = Defaulted

=== Finals ===
Quarterfinals
1	(Argentina) Gabriela Sabatini	6	2
5	(Spain) Conchita Martínez	7	6
4	(Switzerland) Manuela Maleeva-Fragniere	6	1	2
15	(Austria) Judith Wiesner	2	6	6
(France) Nathalie Herreman	3	1
3	(Socialist Federal Republic of Yugoslavia) Monica Seles	6	6
21	(West Germany) Claudia Porwik	3	6	3
9	(France) Nathalie Tauziat	6	4	6

Semifinals
5	(Spain) Conchita Martínez	2	1
15	(Austria) Judith Wiesner	6	6
3	(Socialist Federal Republic of Yugoslavia) Monica Seles	6	6
9	(France) Nathalie Tauziat	3	1

Final
15	(Austria) Judith Wiesner	1	2
3	(Socialist Federal Republic of Yugoslavia) Monica Seles	6	6

=== Top half ===
==== Section 1 ====
First round
(Canada) C Bassett-Seguso	0	2
(Belgium) S Wasserman	6	6
(Japan) M Kidowaki	6	6
(South Africa) E Reinach	1	3
(Netherlands) B Schultz	4	1
(United States) A Grossman	6	6
(Argentina) M Paz	4	6	1
(United States) R White	6	2	6

Second round
1	(Argentina) G Sabatini	6	6
(Belgium) S Wasserman	3	4
(Japan) M Kidowaki	7	4	6
25	(New Zealand) B Cordwell	5	6	2
20	(United States) S Sloane	6	6
(United States) A Grossman	1	3
(United States) R White	7	7
11	(United States) A Frazier	6	6

Third round
1	(Argentina) G Sabatini	6	6
(Japan) M Kidowaki	2	3
20	(United States) S Sloane	6	6
(United States) R White	3	3

Fourth round
1	(Argentina) Gabriela Sabatini	6	6
20	(United States) Susan Sloane	2	2

==== Section 2 ====
First round
(West Germany) W Probst	6	6
(United States) E Burgin	2	1
(Australia) E Smylie	6	4	6
(Poland) R Baranski	4	6	2
(France) K Quentrec	6	6
(United States) B Bowes	3	3
(South Africa) D Van Rensburg	6	6
(United States) S Collins	4	1

Second round
14	(United States) G Rush	6	6
(West Germany) W Probst	2	3
(Australia) E Smylie	6	6
29	(United States) B Nagelsen	2	4
23	(West Germany) S Hanika	7	3	4
(France) K Quentrec	5	6	6
(South Africa) D Van Rensburg	6	6	6
5	(Spain) C Martínez	3	7	7

Third round
14	(United States) G Rush	6	6
(Australia) E Smylie	2	4
(France) K Quentrec	3	4
5	(Spain) C Martínez	6	6

Fourth round
14	(United States) Gretchen Rush	6	5	4
5	(Spain) Conchita Martínez	4	7	6

==== Section 3 ====
First round
(United States) D Faber	6	6
(United States) S Stafford	2	1
(United States) H Cioffi	5	4
(United States) C Benjamin	7	6
(West Germany) S Hack	6	7
(Brazil) T Zambrzycki	2	5
(United Kingdom) M Javer	1	3
(South Africa) A Coetzer	6	6

Second round
4	(Switzerland) M Maleeva-Fragniere	6	6
(United States) D Faber	0	2
(United States) C Benjamin	2	6	7
17	(Sweden) C Lindqvist	6	4	5
28	(Netherlands) M Bollegraf	6	6
(West Germany) S Hack	0	1
(South Africa) A Coetzer	6	3	6
(Italy) R Reggi	2	6	7

Third round
4	(Switzerland) M Maleeva-Fragniere	6	6
(United States) C Benjamin	1	2
28	(Netherlands) M Bollegraf	7	3	1
10	(Italy) R Reggi	6	6	6

Fourth round
4	(Switzerland) Manuela Maleeva-Fragniere	6	3	6
10	(Italy) Raffaella Reggi	1	6	2

==== Section 4 ====
First round
(United States) M Werdel	7	7
(Japan) A Kijimuta	6	6
(United States) A Henricksson	6	3	6
(United States) T Phelps	4	6	7
(Japan) E Inoue	7	0	6
(United States) S Martin	6	6	3
(Netherlands) H Ter Riet	2	2
(United States) L Bonder-Kreiss	6	6

Second round
15	(Austria) J Wiesner	7	0	6
(United States) M Werdel	6	6	3
(United States) T Phelps	7	6
22	(France) I Demongeot	6	1
32	(United States) K Rinaldi	7	6
(Japan) E Inoue	6	1
(United States) L Bonder-Kreiss	0	6	1
7	(Czechoslovakia) J Novotná	6	1	6

Third round
15	(Austria) J Wiesner	6	5	6
(United States) T Phelps	1	7	2
32	(United States) K Rinaldi	0	6	1
7	(Czechoslovakia) J Novotná	6	1	6

Fourth round
15	(Austria) Judith Wiesner	7	5	6
7	(Czechoslovakia) Jana Novotná	5	7	3

=== Bottom half ===
==== Section 5 ====
First round
(United States) L Spadea	5	3
(United States) J Capriati	7	6
(Brazil) A Vieira	6	6
(France) C Tanvier	3	4
(Soviet Union) N Medvedeva	6	2^{r}
(Switzerland) C Caverzasio	7	2
(France) N Herreman	6	6
(Peru) P Vasquez	0	0

Second round
6	(Czechoslovakia) H Suková	3	2
(United States) J Capriati	6	6
(Brazil) A Vieira	3	4
31	(United States) P Fendick	6	6
26	(Australia) A Minter	5	6	0
(Switzerland) C Caverzasio	7	2	6
(France) N Herreman	6	6
12	(Peru) L Gildemeister	1	1

Third round
(United States) J Capriati	4
31	(United States) P Fendick	2^{r}
(Switzerland) C Caverzasio	3	4
(France) N Herreman	6	6

Fourth round
(United States) Jennifer Capriati	2	4
(France) Nathalie Herreman	6	6

==== Section 6 ====
First round
(United States) K Adams	3	1
(United States) C Cunningham	6	6
(United States) L McNeil	6	7
(Sweden) M Strandlund	3	5
(Czechoslovakia) J Pospíšilová	2	3
(Italy) L Lapi	6	6
(United States) L Harvey-Wild	7	6
(Mexico) A Gavaldón	5	4

Second round
13	(South Africa) R Fairbank-Nideffer	6	6
(United States) C Cunningham	2	4
(United States) L McNeil	4	6	7
27	(Hungary) A Temesvári-Trunkos	6	4	5
30	(Czechoslovakia) R Rajchrtová	1	6
(Italy) L Lapi	6	7
(United States) L Harvey-Wild	1	4
3	(Socialist Federal Republic of Yugoslavia) M Seles	6	6

Third round
13	(South Africa) R Fairbank-Nideffer	6	2	6
(United States) L McNeil	2	6	3
(Italy) L Lapi	1	1
3	(Socialist Federal Republic of Yugoslavia) M Seles	6	6

Fourth round
13	(South Africa) Rosalyn Fairbank-Nideffer	3	4
3	(Socialist Federal Republic of Yugoslavia) Monica Seles	6	6

==== Section 7 ====
First round
(Argentina) F Labat	2	7	6
(United States) M McGrath	6	6	3
(United Kingdom) S Loosemore	3
(United States) K Gompert	4^{r}
(United States) J Santrock	0	7	1
(Italy) L Garrone	6	6	6
(France) N Guerrée-Spitzer	3	2
(United States) T Whitlinger	6	6

Second round
8	(Canada) H Kelesi	6	6
(Argentina) F Labat	4	2
(United Kingdom) S Loosemore	2	3
21	(West Germany) C Porwik	6	6
24	(Argentina) B Fulco	6	4	6
(Italy) L Garrone	4	6	1
(United States) T Whitlinger	6	6
16	(United States) A Smith	1	4

Third round
8	(Canada) H Kelesi	4	1
21	(West Germany) C Porwik	6	6
24	(Argentina) B Fulco	7	3	7
(United States) T Whitlinger	6	6	6

Fourth round
21	(West Germany) Claudia Porwik	6	6
24	(Argentina) Bettina Fulco	2	3

==== Section 8 ====
First round
(United States) C MacGregor	6	6
(Italy) B Romano	1	2
(Japan) N Miyagi	6	6
(Argentina) P Tarabini	0	2
(United States) R Reis	5	2
(United States) A Keller	7	6
(United States) M Louie-Harper	1	4
(France) J Halard	6	6

Second round
9	(France) N Tauziat	6	4	6
(United States) C MacGregor	2	6	3
(Japan) N Miyagi	6	6
18	(Czechoslovakia) R Zrubáková	1	2
19	(Soviet Union) L Savchenko	3	5
(United States) A Keller	6	7
(France) J Halard	2	6	6
2	(United States) Z Garrison-Jackson	6	3	4

Third round
9	(France) N Tauziat	6	6
(Japan) N Miyagi	1	4
(United States) A Keller	3	6	0
(France) J Halard	6	4	6

Fourth round
9	(France) Nathalie Tauziat	6	6
(France) Julie Halard	4	3
