= 1988 Taranto Open – Singles =

Singles
- 1988 Taranto Open

Final
- Champion: (Canada) Helen Kelesi
- Runner-up: (Italy) Laura Garrone
- Score: 6–1, 6–0

Details
- Draw: 32
- Seeds: 8

Events
Singles	Doubles
← 1985 ·	Taranto Open	· 1989 →

Helen Kelesi won in the final 6–1, 6–0 against Laura Garrone.

== Seeds ==
A champion seed is indicated in bold text while text in italics indicates the round in which that seed was eliminated.

1. (Canada) **Helen Kelesi (champion)**
2. (West Germany) Claudia Porwik (first round)
3. (West Germany) Eva Pfaff (second round)
4. (Austria) Barbara Paulus (first round)
5. (Italy) Federica Bonsignori (second round)
6. (Czechoslovakia) Radka Zrubáková (quarterfinals)
7. (West Germany) Christina Singer (second round)
8. (Italy) Laura Garrone (final)

== Draw ==
=== Key ===
- Q = Qualifier
- WC = Wild card
- LL = Lucky loser
- Alt = Alternate
- SE = Special exempt
- PR = Protected ranking
- ITF = ITF entry
- JE = Junior exempt
- w/o = Walkover
- r = Retired
- d = Defaulted
- SR = Special ranking

First round
1	(Canada) **H Kelesi**	**6**	**6**
(Greece) O Tsarbopoulou	4	4
(Italy) **L Golarsa**	**6**	4	**6**
(Czechoslovakia) H Fukárková	4	**6**	2
(Italy) **C Caverzasio**	**6**	**6**
(Italy) C Nozzoli	2	2
(Australia) J Byrne	1	1
6	(Czechoslovakia) **R Zrubáková**	**6**	**6**
3	(West Germany) **E Pfaff**	1	**6**	**7**
(United States) A Schwartz	**6**	3	5
Q	(Switzerland) S Jaquet	2	4
(France) **A Dechaume**	**6**	**6**
(France) E Derly	2	4
Q	(West Germany) **V Martinek**	**6**	**6**
(Netherlands) H ter Riet	4	5
7	(West Germany) **C Singer**	**6**	**7**
5	(Italy) **F Bonsignori**	**6**	4	**6**
(West Germany) A Betzner	2	**6**	3
(Australia) S McCann	**6**	2	3
Q	(Czechoslovakia) **J Pospíšilová**	4	**6**	**6**
(Greece) A Kanellopoulou	5	5
Q	(Italy) **S La Fratta**	**7**	**7**
(Italy) **L Ferrando**	**6**	**6**
4	(Austria) B Paulus	2	3
8	(Italy) **L Garrone**	**6**	**6**
(United States) G Kim	0	1
(West Germany) G Dinu	5	3
(Brazil) **A Vieira**	**7**	**6**
(Australia) L O'Neill	**6**	3	3
(Italy) **G Boschiero**	3	**6**	**6**
(Italy) **L Lapi**	**6**	**6**
2	(West Germany) C Porwik	4	1

Second round
1	(Canada) **H Kelesi**	**6**	**6**
(Italy) L Golarsa	2	2
(Italy) C Caverzasio	**7**	5	1
6	(Czechoslovakia) **R Zrubáková**	6	**7**	**6**
3	(West Germany) E Pfaff	2	6
(France) **A Dechaume**	**6**	**7**
Q	(West Germany) **V Martinek**	**6**	**6**
7	(West Germany) C Singer	1	1
5	(Italy) F Bonsignori	**6**	2	6
(Czechoslovakia) **J Pospíšilová**	3	**6**	**7**
Q	(Italy) S La Fratta	4	**7**	4
(Italy) **L Ferrando**	**6**	5	**6**
8	(Italy) **L Garrone**	**6**	**6**
(Brazil) A Vieira	3	4
(Italy) G Boschiero	2	2
(Italy) **L Lapi**	**6**	**6**

Quarterfinals
1	(Canada) **H Kelesi**	**6**	**6**
6	(Czechoslovakia) R Zrubáková	3	3
(France) A Dechaume	**6**	5	2
Q	(West Germany) **V Martinek**	4	**7**	**6**
(Czechoslovakia) J Pospíšilová	4	6
(Italy) **L Ferrando**	**6**	**7**
8	(Italy) **L Garrone**	4	**7**	**6**
(Italy) L Lapi	**6**	5	1

Semifinals
1	(Canada) **H Kelesi**	**7**	4	**6**
Q	(West Germany) V Martinek	5	**6**	1
(Italy) L Ferrando	**6**	1	3
8	(Italy) **L Garrone**	4	**6**	**6**

Final
1	(Canada) **Helen Kelesi**	**6**	**6**
8	(Italy) Laura Garrone	1	0
