= 1991 Trofeo Ilva-Coppa Mantegazza – Singles =

Singles
- 1991 Trofeo Ilva-Coppa Mantegazza

Final
- Champion: (Switzerland) Emanuela Zardo
- Runner-up: (Austria) Petra Ritter
- Score: 7–5, 6–2

Details
- Draw: 32 (4Q/3LL)
- Seeds: 9

Events
Singles	Doubles
← 1990 ·	Ilva Trophy	· 1992 →

Raffaella Reggi was the defending champion, but did not compete this year.

Emanuela Zardo won the title by defeating Petra Ritter 7–5, 6–2 in the final.

== Seeds ==
1. (Italy) Federica Bonsignori (quarterfinals)
2. (United States) Ann Grossman (first round)
3. (Italy) Laura Golarsa (second round)
4. (Italy) Katia Piccolini (first round)
5. (Spain) ~~Conchita Martínez~~ (withdrew)
6. (Switzerland) Cathy Caverzasio (first round)
7. (Italy) ~~Laura Garrone~~ (withdrew)
8. (France) Alexia Dechaume (second round)
9. (Switzerland) Emanuela Zardo (champion)

== Draw ==
=== Key ===
- Q = Qualifier
- WC = Wild card
- LL = Lucky loser
- Alt = Alternate
- SE = Special exempt
- PR = Protected ranking
- ITF = ITF entry
- JE = Junior exempt
- w/o = Walkover
- r = Retired
- d = Defaulted
- SR = Special ranking

=== Finals ===
Semifinals
(Austria) Petra Ritter	3	6	6
(Italy) Silvia Farina	6	1	0
LL	(Finland) Nanne Dahlman	0	3
9	(Switzerland) Emanuela Zardo	6	6

Final
(Austria) Petra Ritter	5	2
9	(Switzerland) Emanuela Zardo	7	6

=== Top half ===
First round
1	(Italy) F Bonsignori	6	6
(Hungary) C Bartos	4	3
(Austria) B Reinstadler	5	7^{9}	2
(France) N Herreman	7	6^{7}	6
(Austria) P Ritter	6	6
Q	(United States) C Kuhlman	3	0
(Sweden) C Dahlman	2	0
8	(France) A Dechaume	6	6
4	(Italy) K Piccolini	3	4
(Italy) S Farina	6	6
(France) M Laval	3	1
LL	(Netherlands) M Oremans	6	6
(Argentina) F Labat	6	4	6
(France) M Pierce	3	6	3
(Italy) F Romano	6	6
6	(Switzerland) C Caverzasio	3	4

Second round
1	(Italy) F Bonsignori	6	6
(France) N Herreman	4	3
(Austria) P Ritter	6	2	6
8	(France) A Dechaume	2	6	2
(Italy) S Farina	6	6
LL	(Netherlands) M Oremans	3	3
(Argentina) F Labat	6	6
(Italy) F Romano	4	4

Quarterfinals
1	(Italy) F Bonsignori	1	6	4
(Austria) P Ritter	6	0	6
(Italy) S Farina	2	6	6
(Argentina) F Labat	6	3	4

Semifinals
(Austria) P Ritter	3	6	6
(Italy) S Farina	6	1	0

=== Bottom half ===
First round
LL	(Finland) N Dahlman	7	6
(France) C Mothes-Jobkel	5	1
(Greece) A Kanellopoulou	6	6
LL	(Italy) L Lapi	2	4
Q	(Finland) P Thorén	6	6
(Italy) R Grande	4	1
(France) P Etchemendy	0	3
3	(Italy) L Golarsa	6	6
9	(Switzerland) E Zardo	6	6
(Austria) M Maruska	1	3
Q	(Soviet Union) A Blumberga	2	0
(Netherlands) S Rottier	6	6
(France) N van Lottum	6	7
(Japan) A Kijimuta	1	5
Q	(Czechoslovakia) R Bobková	6	6
2	(United States) A Grossman	4	2

Second round
LL	(Finland) N Dahlman	1	6	7
(Greece) A Kanellopoulou	6	1	5
Q	(Finland) P Thorén	6	6
3	(Italy) L Golarsa	3	4
9	(Switzerland) E Zardo	6	6
(Netherlands) S Rottier	3	1
(France) N van Lottum	7^{7}	6
Q	(Czechoslovakia) R Bobková	6^{3}	0

Quarterfinals
LL	(Finland) N Dahlman	6	3	6
Q	(Finland) P Thorén	2	6	3
9	(Switzerland) E Zardo	5	6	6
(France) N van Lottum	7	3	2

Semifinals
LL	(Finland) N Dahlman	0	3
9	(Switzerland) E Zardo	6	6
