= 1991 Lipton International Players Championships – Women's doubles =

Women's doubles
- 1991 Lipton International Players Championships

Final
- Champions: (United States) Mary Joe Fernández (United States) Zina Garrison
- Runners-up: (United States) Gigi Fernández (Czechoslovakia) Jana Novotná
- Score: 7–5, 6–2

Details
- Draw: 48 (2WC/3Q/1LL)
- Seeds: 16

Events
Singles	men	women
Doubles	men	women
← 1990 ·	Miami Open	· 1992 →

Jana Novotná and Helena Suková were the defending champions, but Suková did not compete this year.

Novotná teamed up with Gigi Fernández and lost in the final to Mary Joe Fernández and Zina Garrison. The score was 7–5, 6–2.

== Seeds ==
All seeded players received a bye into the second round.

1. (United States) Gigi Fernández / (Czechoslovakia) Jana Novotná (final)
2. (United States) Larisa Savchenko / (Soviet Union) Natasha Zvereva (third round)
3. (United States) Kathy Jordan / (Australia) Elizabeth Smylie (third round)
4. (United States) Mary Joe Fernández / (United States) Zina Garrison (champions)
5. (United States) ~~Meredith McGrath~~ / (United States) ~~Anne Smith~~ (withdrew)
6. (United States) Gretchen Magers / (United States) Robin White (semifinals)
7. (United States) Elise Burgin / (United States) Patty Fendick (third round)
8. (United States) Katrina Adams / (Canada) Helen Kelesi (quarterfinals)
9. (Netherlands) Manon Bollegraf / (Italy) Raffaella Reggi (third round)
10. (United Kingdom) Jo Durie / (South Africa) Lise Gregory (third round)
11. (Canada) Jill Hetherington / (United States) Kathy Rinaldi (quarterfinals)
12. (Netherlands) Brenda Schultz / (South Africa) Rosalyn Fairbank-Nideffer (quarterfinals)
13. (Soviet Union) Elena Brioukhovets / (Soviet Union) Natalia Medvedeva (third round)
14. (United States) Mary-Lou Daniels / (United States) Peanut Louie Harper (second round)
15. (Australia) Jo-Anne Faull / (Australia) Michelle Jaggard (second round)
16. (United States) Lori McNeil / (United States) Pam Shriver (third round)

== Draw ==
=== Finals ===
Quarterfinals
1	(United States) Gigi Fernández (Czechoslovakia) Jana Novotná	6	4	6
(United States) Jennifer Capriati (Argentina) Gabriela Sabatini	0	6	3
11	(Canada) Jill Hetherington (United States) Kathy Rinaldi	6^{2}	1
(Germany) Eva Pfaff (Australia) Rennae Stubbs	7^{7}	6
8	(United States) Katrina Adams (Canada) Helen Kelesi	3	6^{6}
4	(United States) Mary Joe Fernández (United States) Zina Garrison	6	7^{8}
6	(United States) Gretchen Magers (United States) Robin White	2	6	6
13	(Netherlands) Brenda Schultz (South Africa) Rosalyn Fairbank-Nideffer	6	2	3

Semifinals
1	(United States) Gigi Fernández (Czechoslovakia) Jana Novotná	6	6
(Germany) Eva Pfaff (Australia) Rennae Stubbs	2	2
4	(United States) Mary Joe Fernández (United States) Zina Garrison	1	6	7^{7}
6	(United States) Gretchen Magers (United States) Robin White	6	1	6^{3}

Final
1	(United States) Gigi Fernández (Czechoslovakia) Jana Novotná	5	2
4	(United States) Mary Joe Fernández (United States) Zina Garrison	7	6

=== Top half ===
==== Section 1 ====
First round
(Switzerland) C Caverzasio (Belgium) S Wasserman	6	7^{7}
(United States) K Steinmetz (United States) T Whittington	4	6^{4}
(Belgium) A Devries (France) N van Lottum	6	6
(Czechoslovakia) R Rajchrtová (Czechoslovakia) E Švíglerová	4	1
(United States) J Capriati (Argentina) G Sabatini	6	6
(United States) A May (Japan) N Miyagi	1	2
Q	(Japan) R Hiraki (New Zealand) C Toleafoa	3	4
(Poland) R Baranski (United Kingdom) S Smith	6	6

Second round
1	(United States) G Fernández (Czechoslovakia) J Novotná	6	7^{7}
(Switzerland) C Caverzasio (Belgium) S Wasserman	2	6^{1}
(Belgium) A Devries (France) N van Lottum	6	2	3
10	(United Kingdom) J Durie (South Africa) L Gregory	4	6	6
15	(Australia) J Faull (Australia) M Jaggard	2	6	3
(United States) J Capriati (Argentina) G Sabatini	6	1	6
(Poland) R Baranski (United Kingdom) S Smith	2	3
(South Africa) A Coetzer (United States) C Cunningham	6	6

Third round
1	(United States) G Fernández (Czechoslovakia) J Novotná	6	6
10	(United Kingdom) J Durie (South Africa) L Gregory	4	4
(United States) J Capriati (Argentina) G Sabatini	7	6
(South Africa) A Coetzer (United States) C Cunningham	5	1

Quarterfinals
1	(United States) G Fernández (Czechoslovakia) J Novotná	6	4	6
(United States) J Capriati (Argentina) G Sabatini	0	6	3

==== Section 2 ====
First round
(United States) S Collins (United States) R Reis	4	5
(United States) J Smoller (United States) M Werdel	6	7
(New Zealand) R Seeman (Peru) P Vásquez	1	2
(United States) Ca MacGregor (United States) P Mager	6	6
(Germany) E Pfaff (Australia) R Stubbs	1	6	7^{7}
(United States) A Henricksson (France) N Herreman	6	3	6^{3}
WC	(United States) K May-Paben (United States) L Bonder-Kreiss	1	0
(France) I Demongeot (France) N Tauziat	6	6

Second round
3	(United States) K Jordan (Australia) E Smylie	6	6
(United States) J Smoller (United States) M Werdel	0	0
(United States) Ca MacGregor (United States) P Mager	4	7^{7}	4
11	(Canada) J Hetherington (United States) K Rinaldi	6	6^{5}	6
14	(United States) ML Daniels (United States) PL Harper	2	2
(Germany) E Pfaff (Australia) R Stubbs	6	6
(France) I Demongeot (France) N Tauziat	6^{3}	1
7	(United States) E Burgin (United States) P Fendick	7^{7}	6

Third round
3	(United States) K Jordan (Australia) E Smylie	7	6^{2}	6^{3}
11	(Canada) J Hetherington (United States) K Rinaldi	5	7^{7}	7^{7}
(Germany) E Pfaff (Australia) R Stubbs	2	6	6
7	(United States) E Burgin (United States) P Fendick	6	2	1

Quarterfinals
11	(Canada) J Hetherington (United States) K Rinaldi	6^{2}	1
(Germany) E Pfaff (Australia) R Stubbs	7^{7}	6

=== Bottom half ===
==== Section 3 ====
First round
WC	(United States) C Benjamin (United States) B Bowes	6	2	4
(Germany) C Porwik (Germany) W Probst	4	6	6
(Argentina) B Fulco (Argentina) F Labat	3	6	0
(Italy) L Ferrando (Luxembourg) K Kschwendt	6	4	6
(Brazil) C Chabalgoity (Indonesia) S Anggarkusuma	6^{4}	6	6^{4}
LL	(United States) P O'Reilly (United States) Terri O'Reilly	7^{7}	3	7^{7}
(United States) H Ludloff (France) C Suire	6	6
(United States) L Spadea (United States) T Whitlinger	2	3

Second round
8	(United States) K Adams (Canada) H Kelesi	6	6
(Germany) C Porwik (Germany) W Probst	2	3
(Italy) L Ferrando (Luxembourg) K Kschwendt	2	1
9	(Netherlands) M Bollegraf (Italy) R Reggi	6	6
12	(Soviet Union) E Brioukhovets (Soviet Union) N Medvedeva	4	6	6
LL	(United States) P O'Reilly (United States) Terri O'Reilly	6	3	0
(United States) H Ludloff (France) C Suire	3	4
4	(United States) MJ Fernández (United States) Z Garrison	6	6

Third round
8	(United States) K Adams (Canada) H Kelesi	6	6
9	(Netherlands) M Bollegraf (Italy) R Reggi	2	1
12	(Soviet Union) E Brioukhovets (Soviet Union) N Medvedeva	2	2
4	(United States) MJ Fernández (United States) Z Garrison	6	6

Quarterfinals
8	(United States) K Adams (Canada) H Kelesi	3	6^{6}
4	(United States) MJ Fernández (United States) Z Garrison	6	7^{8}

==== Section 4 ====
First round
Q	(Netherlands) P Kamstra (Netherlands) M Oremans	6^{7}	6	3
Q	(United States) E deLone (United States) A Keller	7^{9}	2	6
(Namibia) Altie Barnard (United States) Cy MacGregor	6	4	3
(Netherlands) C Bakkum (United Kingdom) C Wood	2	6	6
(Netherlands) H ter Riet (Canada) R Simpson-Alter	1	3
(Peru) L Gildemeister (Denmark) T Scheuer-Larsen	6	6
(United States) S Rehe (Socialist Federal Republic of Yugoslavia) M Seles	7^{7}	6^{4}	7
(France) A Dechaume (France) M Pierce	6^{3}	7^{7}	5

Second round
6	(United States) G Magers (United States) R White	7^{8}	6
Q	(United States) E deLone (United States) A Keller	6^{6}	0
(Netherlands) C Bakkum (United Kingdom) C Wood	6^{6}	2
16	(United States) L McNeil (United States) P Shriver	7^{8}	6
13	(Netherlands) B Schultz (South Africa) R Fairbank-Nideffer	6	6
(Peru) L Gildemeister (Denmark) T Scheuer-Larsen	3	2
(United States) S Rehe (Socialist Federal Republic of Yugoslavia) M Seles	5	4
2	(Soviet Union) L Savchenko (Soviet Union) N Zvereva	7	6

Third round
6	(United States) G Magers (United States) R White	6	4	7^{7}
16	(United States) L McNeil (United States) P Shriver	3	6	6^{4}
13	(Netherlands) B Schultz (South Africa) R Fairbank-Nideffer	3	6	6
2	(Soviet Union) L Savchenko (Soviet Union) N Zvereva	6	4	2

Quarterfinals
6	(United States) G Magers (United States) R White	2	6	6
13	(Netherlands) B Schultz (South Africa) R Fairbank-Nideffer	6	2	3
