= 1988 Taranto Open – Doubles =

Doubles
- 1988 Taranto Open

Final
- Champions: (West Germany) Andrea Betzner (West Germany) Claudia Porwik
- Runners-up: (Italy) Laura Garrone (Canada) Helen Kelesi
- Score: 6–1, 6–2

Details
- Draw: 16
- Seeds: 4

Events
| Singles | Doubles |
| ← 1985 · | Taranto Open | · 1989 → |

Andrea Betzner and Claudia Porwik won in the final 6–1, 6–2 against Laura Garrone and Helen Kelesi.

== Seeds ==
Champion seeds are indicated in bold text while text in italics indicates the round in which those seeds were eliminated.

1. (West Germany) **Andrea Betzner** / (West Germany) **Claudia Porwik (champions)**
2. (Italy) Laura Garrone / (Canada) Helen Kelesi (final)
3. (Czechoslovakia) Hana Fukárková / (Czechoslovakia) Jana Pospíšilová (first round)
4. (Italy) Linda Ferrando / (Italy) Laura Golarsa (first round)

== Draw ==
=== Key ===
- Q = Qualifier
- WC = Wild card
- LL = Lucky loser
- Alt = Alternate
- SE = Special exempt
- PR = Protected ranking
- ITF = ITF entry
- JE = Junior exempt
- w/o = Walkover
- r = Retired
- d = Defaulted
- SR = Special ranking

First round
1 | (West Germany) **A Betzner** (West Germany) **C Porwik** | 3 | **6** | **6**
(Argentina) G Mosca (Greece) O Tsarbopoulou | **6** | 0 | 3
(United States) J Fuchs (United States) J Smoller
(Italy) **F Bonsignori** (Greece) **A Kanellopoulou** | **w/o**
4 | (Italy) L Ferrando (Italy) L Golarsa | 3 | **6** | 0
(West Germany) **G Dinu** (West Germany) **S Hack** | **6** | 3 | **6**
(Italy) S La Fratta (Italy) L Lapi | **6** | 5 | 4
(Switzerland) **S Jaquet** (Australia) **T Morton** | 4 | **7** | **6**
(United Kingdom) L Gould (Australia) S McCann | 1 | 3
(Brazil) **L Tella** (Brazil) **A Vieira** | **6** | **6**
(Australia) **L O'Neill** (Netherlands) **H ter Riet** | **6** | 2 | **6**
3 | (Czechoslovakia) H Fukárková (Czechoslovakia) J Pospíšilová | 2 | **6** | 3
(Czechoslovakia) D Krajčovičová (Czechoslovakia) R Zrubáková | **6** | 3 | 4
(West Germany) **V Martinek** (Austria) **H Sprung** | 1 | **6** | **6**
(France) A Dechaume (France) E Derly | **6** | 5 | 1
2 | (Italy) **L Garrone** (Canada) **H Kelesi** | 4 | **7** | **6**

Quarterfinals
1 | (West Germany) **A Betzner** (West Germany) **C Porwik** | **6** | **6**
(Italy) F Bonsignori (Greece) A Kanellopoulou | 3 | 2
(West Germany) G Dinu (West Germany) S Hack | 3 | **6** | 1
(Switzerland) **S Jaquet** (Australia) **T Morton** | **6** | 3 | **6**
(Brazil) **L Tella** (Brazil) **A Vieira** | **6** | **6**
(Australia) L O'Neill (Netherlands) H ter Riet | 3 | 2
(West Germany) V Martinek (Austria) H Sprung | 2 | 3
2 | (Italy) **L Garrone** (Canada) **H Kelesi** | **6** | **6**

Semifinals
1 | (West Germany) **A Betzner** (West Germany) **C Porwik** | **7** | 3 | **6**
(Switzerland) S Jaquet (Australia) T Morton | 5 | **6** | 0
(Brazil) L Tella (Brazil) A Vieira | 2 | **6** | 4
2 | (Italy) **L Garrone** (Canada) **H Kelesi** | **6** | 0 | **6**

Final
1 | (West Germany) **Andrea Betzner** (West Germany) **Claudia Porwik** | **6** | **6**
2 | (Italy) Laura Garrone (Canada) Helen Kelesi | 1 | 2
