= 1990 Trofeo Ilva-Coppa Mantegazza – Singles =

Singles
- 1990 Trofeo Ilva-Coppa Mantegazza

Final
- Champion: (Italy) Raffaella Reggi
- Runner-up: (France) Alexia Dechaume
- Score: 3–6, 6–0, 6–2

Details
- Draw: 32 (4Q)
- Seeds: 8

Events
| Singles | Doubles |
| ← 1989 · | Ilva Trophy | · 1991 → |

Karine Quentrec was the defending champion, but did not compete this year.

Raffaella Reggi won the title by defeating Alexia Dechaume 3–6, 6–0, 6–2 in the final.

== Seeds ==
1. (Italy) Raffaella Reggi (champion)
2. (Italy) Laura Golarsa (quarterfinals)
3. (Italy) Laura Garrone (second round)
4. (United States) Ann Grossman (quarterfinals)
5. (Italy) Barbara Romanò (first round)
6. (Czechoslovakia) Jana Pospíšilová (first round)
7. (Argentina) Federica Haumüller (first round)
8. (Czechoslovakia) Eva Švíglerová (first round)

== Draw ==
=== Key ===
- Q = Qualifier
- WC = Wild card
- LL = Lucky loser
- Alt = Alternate
- SE = Special exempt
- PR = Protected ranking
- ITF = ITF entry
- JE = Junior exempt
- w/o = Walkover
- r = Retired
- d = Defaulted
- SR = Special ranking

=== Finals ===
Semifinals
1 | (Italy) Raffaella Reggi | 6 | 2 | 6
(France) Pascale Etchemendy | 3 | 6 | 4
(Austria) Petra Ritter | 2 | 3
Q | (France) Alexia Dechaume | 6 | 6

Final
1 | (Italy) Raffaella Reggi | 3 | 6 | 6
Q | (France) Alexia Dechaume | 6 | 0 | 2

=== Top half ===
First round
1 | (Italy) R Reggi | 6 | 4 | 6
(Belgium) A Devries | 1 | 6 | 2
(New Zealand) C Toleafoa | 6 | 2
(Brazil) C Chabalgoity | 7 | 6
(Denmark) T Scheuer-Larsen | 6 | 6
(Czechoslovakia) I Budařová | 2 | 0
(Australia) K Godridge | 0 | 7 | 6
6 | (Czechoslovakia) J Pospíšilová | 6 | 5 | 1
4 | (United States) A Grossman | 6 | 6
(Switzerland) E Zardo | 2 | 3
(Italy) F Romano | 6 | 6
(Switzerland) C Cohen | 3 | 1
(Italy) F Bonsignori | 6 | 6
(Austria) B Reinstadler | 3 | 4
(France) P Etchemendy | 6 | 7
8 | (Czechoslovakia) E Švíglerová | 1 | 5

Second round
1 | (Italy) R Reggi | 6 | 6
(Brazil) C Chabalgoity | 3 | 0
(Denmark) T Scheuer-Larsen | 6 | 3 | 6
(Australia) K Godridge | 4 | 6 | 0
4 | (United States) A Grossman | 6 | 6
(Italy) F Romano | 1 | 1
(Italy) F Bonsignori | 6 | 0 | 2
(France) P Etchemendy | 3 | 6 | 6

Quarterfinals
1 | (Italy) R Reggi | 5 | 6 | 6
(Denmark) T Scheuer-Larsen | 7 | 2 | 3
4 | (United States) A Grossman | 6 | 0 | 2
(France) P Etchemendy | 3 | 6 | 6

Semifinals
1 | (Italy) R Reggi | 6 | 2 | 6
(France) P Etchemendy | 3 | 6 | 4

=== Bottom half ===
First round
7 | (Argentina) F Haumüller | 4 | 6 | 4
(Czechoslovakia) L Lásková | 6 | 4 | 6
Q | (Italy) K Piccolini | 6 | 6
Q | (Austria) M Maruska | 1 | 1
(Austria) P Ritter | 4 | 6 | 7
(West Germany) V Martinek | 6 | 3 | 5
Q | (United Kingdom) S Smith | 2 | 4
3 | (Italy) L Garrone | 6 | 6
5 | (Italy) B Romanò | 6 | 6 | 6
(Italy) S La Fratta | 0 | 7 | 7
Q | (France) A Dechaume | 6 | 6
(Finland) P Thorén | 4 | 2
(Australia) J Tremelling | 3 | 1
(Italy) S Farina | 6 | 6
(Argentina) A Tiezzi | 2 | 2
2 | (Italy) L Golarsa | 6 | 6

Second round
(Czechoslovakia) L Lásková | 6 | 1
Q | (Italy) K Piccolini | 7 | 6
(Austria) P Ritter | 6 | 6
3 | (Italy) L Garrone | 2 | 0
(Italy) S La Fratta | 6 | 6 | 4
Q | (France) A Dechaume | 4 | 7 | 6
(Italy) S Farina | 4 | 5
2 | (Italy) L Golarsa | 6 | 7

Quarterfinals
Q | (Italy) K Piccolini | 7 | 4 | 3
(Austria) P Ritter | 5 | 6 | 6
Q | (France) A Dechaume | 7 | 6
2 | (Italy) L Golarsa | 6 | 2

Semifinals
(Austria) P Ritter | 2 | 3
Q | (France) A Dechaume | 6 | 6
