= 1990 Lipton International Players Championships – Men's singles =

Men's singles
- 1990 Lipton International Players Championships

Final
- Champion: (United States) Andre Agassi
- Runner-up: (Sweden) Stefan Edberg
- Score: 6–1, 6–4, 0–6, 6–2

Details
- Draw: 96
- Seeds: 32

Events
Singles	men	women
Doubles	men	women
← 1989 ·	Miami Open	· 1991 →

Andre Agassi defeated Stefan Edberg in the final, 6–1, 6–4, 0–6, 6–2 to win the men's singles tennis title at the 1990 Miami Open.

Ivan Lendl was the defending champion, but lost in the fourth round to Emilio Sánchez.

== Seeds ==
All seeds received a bye to the second round.

1. (Czechoslovakia) Ivan Lendl (fourth round)
2. (West Germany) Boris Becker (third round)
3. (Sweden) Stefan Edberg (final)
4. (United States) Brad Gilbert (third round)
5. (United States) Andre Agassi (champion)
6. (United States) Aaron Krickstein (second round)
7. (United States) Jay Berger (semifinals)
8. (United States) Tim Mayotte (second round)
9. (France) Yannick Noah (second round)
10. (Argentina) Martín Jaite (quarterfinals)
11. (Argentina) Alberto Mancini (second round)
12. (Ecuador) Andrés Gómez (fourth round)
13. (West Germany) Carl-Uwe Steeb (fourth round)
14. (United States) Jim Courier (quarterfinals)
15. (Spain) Emilio Sánchez (semifinals)
16. (United States) Pete Sampras (quarterfinals, withdrew)
17. (Soviet Union) Andrei Chesnokov (second round)
18. (Austria) Horst Skoff (third round)
19. (United States) Kevin Curren (third round)
20. (Czechoslovakia) Petr Korda (second round)
21. (Peru) Jaime Yzaga (third round)
22. (Spain) Sergi Bruguera (second round)
23. (South Africa) Christo van Rensburg (third round)
24. (Haiti) Ronald Agénor (third round)
25. (United States) Richey Reneberg (third round)
26. (Socialist Federal Republic of Yugoslavia) Goran Ivanišević (third round)
27. (Spain) Jordi Arrese (third round)
28. (Sweden) Jan Gunnarsson (third round)
29. (United States) Scott Davis (second round)
30. (Spain) Javier Sánchez (fourth round)
31. (Uruguay) Marcelo Filippini (third round)
32. (France) Jean-Philippe Fleurian (fourth round)

== Main draw ==
=== Key ===
- Q = Qualifier
- WC = Wild card
- LL = Lucky loser
- Alt = Alternate
- ITF = ITF entry
- PR = Protected ranking
- SR = Special ranking
- SE = Special exempt
- JE = Junior exempt
- JR = Junior Accelerator Programme entrant
- CO = College Accelerator Programme entrant
- NG = Next Gen Accelerator Program entrant
- w/o = Walkover
- r = Retired
- d = Defaulted

=== Finals ===
Quarterfinals
15	(Spain) Emilio Sánchez	6	6
10	(Argentina) Martín Jaite	3	3
3	(Sweden) Stefan Edberg	6^{7}	7^{7}	7^{8}
(Switzerland) Jakob Hlasek	7^{9}	6^{5}	6^{6}
5	(United States) Andre Agassi	4	6	6
14	(United States) Jim Courier	6	3	1
7	(United States) Jay Berger	w/o
16	(United States) Pete Sampras

Semifinals
15	(Spain) Emilio Sánchez	1	5
3	(Sweden) Stefan Edberg	6	7
5	(United States) Andre Agassi	5	6	6
7	(United States) Jay Berger	7	1	1

Final
3	(Sweden) Stefan Edberg	1	4	6	2
5	(United States) Andre Agassi	6	6	0	6

=== Top half ===
==== Section 1 ====
First round
(West Germany) J Wöhrmann	4	7^{7}	6
(United States) R Matuszewski	6	6^{4}	3
(Sweden) N Kroon	6	7^{7}
(United States) L Shiras	2	6^{5}
(Socialist Federal Republic of Yugoslavia) S Živojinović	6	6
(Spain) T Carbonell	3	4
(Italy) F Cancellotti	1	6^{5}
(United States) L Duncan	6	7^{7}

Second round
1	(Czechoslovakia) I Lendl	6^{3}	6	6
(West Germany) J Wöhrmann	7^{7}	2	1
(Sweden) N Kroon	6	4	6^{6}
31	(Uruguay) M Filippini	2	6	7^{8}
18	(Austria) H Skoff	6	6
(Socialist Federal Republic of Yugoslavia) S Živojinović	2	2
(United States) L Duncan	4	1
15	(Spain) E Sánchez	6	6

Third round
1	(Czechoslovakia) I Lendl	6	6
31	(Uruguay) M Filippini	0	2
18	(Austria) H Skoff	6	3	3
15	(Spain) E Sánchez	3	6	6

Fourth round
1	(Czechoslovakia) I Lendl	3	7^{7}	4
15	(Spain) E Sánchez	6	6^{3}	6

==== Section 2 ====
First round
(Czechoslovakia) K Nováček	4	6	6
(United States) J Kriek	6	0	4
(Sweden) L-A Wahlgren	4	2
(West Germany) M Stich	6	6
(Spain) J Aguilera	7^{7}	2	2
(India) R Krishnan	6^{5}	6	6
(United States) J Brown	6	6^{5}	1
(Soviet Union) A Volkov	4	7^{7}	6

Second round
10	(Argentina) M Jaite	6	6
(Czechoslovakia) K Nováček	4	4
(West Germany) M Stich	3	4
23	(South Africa) C van Rensburg	6	6
25	(United States) R Reneberg	6	7
(India) R Krishnan	3	5
(Soviet Union) A Volkov	6	6
8	(United States) T Mayotte	1	4

Third round
10	(Argentina) M Jaite	4	6	6
23	(South Africa) C van Rensburg	6	4	4
25	(United States) R Reneberg	3	6	3
(Soviet Union) A Volkov	6	3	6

Fourth round
10	(Argentina) M Jaite	6	6
(Soviet Union) A Volkov	1	1

==== Section 3 ====
First round
Q	(New Zealand) K Evernden	5	5
Q	(The Bahamas) R Smith	7	7
(Israel) A Mansdorf	7^{13}	6
(United States) D Rostagno	6^{11}	1
(Sweden) P Lundgren	7^{7}	6
(United Kingdom) J Bates	6^{4}	2
(West Germany) U Riglewski	1	0
Q	(France) G Raoux	6	6

Second round
3	(Sweden) S Edberg	6	2	6
Q	(The Bahamas) R Smith	2	6	4
(Israel) A Mansdorf	6	6
29	(United States) S Davis	2	2
19	(United States) K Curren	6	7^{11}
(Sweden) P Lundgren	0	6^{9}
Q	(France) G Raoux	6	4	3
13	(West Germany) C-U Steeb	2	6	6

Third round
3	(Sweden) S Edberg	6	6
(Israel) A Mansdorf	2	1
19	(United States) K Curren	6	3	2
13	(West Germany) C-U Steeb	3	6	6

Fourth round
3	(Sweden) S Edberg	6	4	6
13	(West Germany) C-U Steeb	2	6	3

==== Section 4 ====
First round
Q	(United States) B Shelton	6	7
(United States) D Goldie	3	5
WC	(France) H Leconte	5	6	3
Q	(United States) J Tarango	7	4	6
(South Africa) P Aldrich	2	4
(Sweden) A Järryd	6	6
(Netherlands) M Schapers	4	7^{7}	4
(Switzerland) J Hlasek	6	6^{3}	6

Second round
11	(Argentina) A Mancini	4	6
Q	(United States) B Shelton	6	7
Q	(United States) J Tarango	6	6
22	(Spain) S Bruguera	2	2
27	(Spain) J Arrese	7^{8}	6
(Sweden) A Järryd	6^{6}	2
(Switzerland) J Hlasek	1	7^{8}	6
6	(United States) A Krickstein	6	6^{6}	3

Third round
Q	(United States) B Shelton	7^{7}	3	6
Q	(United States) J Tarango	6^{5}	6	3
27	(Spain) J Arrese	6^{4}	2
(Switzerland) J Hlasek	7^{7}	6

Fourth round
Q	(United States) B Shelton	3	4
(Switzerland) J Hlasek	6	6

=== Bottom half ===
==== Section 5 ====
First round
(United States) K Jones	6	6
(Canada) A Sznajder	3	1
(Czechoslovakia) M Šrejber	6	5	7^{7}
(Netherlands) T Nijssen	1	7	6^{1}
Q	(Canada) G Connell	6	6
(Australia) J Fitzgerald	4	4
WC	(Australia) P Cash	2	2
(Socialist Federal Republic of Yugoslavia) B Orešar	6	6

Second round
5	(United States) A Agassi	6	6
(United States) K Jones	1	2
(Czechoslovakia) M Šrejber	2	6^{6}
28	(Sweden) J Gunnarsson	6	7^{8}
21	(Peru) J Yzaga	7^{7}	4	7^{9}
Q	(Canada) G Connell	6^{3}	6	6^{7}
(Socialist Federal Republic of Yugoslavia) B Orešar	6	2	3
12	(Ecuador) A Gómez	2	6	6

Third round
5	(United States) A Agassi	6	6
28	(Sweden) J Gunnarsson	1	3
21	(Peru) J Yzaga	6^{3}	6	6^{5}
12	(Ecuador) A Gómez	7^{7}	3	7^{7}

Fourth round
5	(United States) A Agassi	6^{6}	6	6
12	(Ecuador) A Gómez	7^{8}	2	3

==== Section 6 ====
First round
Q	(United States) K Thorne	7	7^{7}
(United States) G Layendecker	5	6^{5}
(United States) T Witsken	7	6
(United States) T Wilkison	5	4
(Soviet Union) A Cherkasov	4	3
(Brazil) C Motta	6	6
(Venezuela) N Pereira	6	4	2
(Israel) G Bloom	2	6	6

Second round
14	(United States) J Courier	6	6
Q	(United States) K Thorne	3	3
(United States) T Witsken	6	2	6
20	(Czechoslovakia) P Korda	2	6	4
30	(Spain) J Sánchez	5	7^{8}	6
(Brazil) C Motta	7	6^{6}	4
(Israel) G Bloom	3	6	3
4	(United States) B Gilbert	6	4	6

Third round
14	(United States) J Courier	6	6
(United States) T Witsken	0	1
30	(Spain) J Sánchez	6	6^{12}	7^{7}
4	(United States) B Gilbert	3	7^{14}	6^{4}

Fourth round
14	(United States) J Courier	7^{7}	6
30	(Spain) J Sánchez	6^{4}	3

==== Section 7 ====
First round
(Uruguay) D Pérez	6	6^{4}	2
Q	(Sweden) D Engel	2	7^{7}	6
(United States) J Arias	4	4
Q	(West Germany) M Zoecke	6	6
(Mexico) J Lozano	4	3
(West Germany) E Jelen	6	6
(Australia) D Cahill	3	6	3
Q	(Australia) M Kratzmann	6	4	6

Second round
7	(United States) J Berger	7^{7}	6
Q	(Sweden) D Engel	6^{5}	4
Q	(West Germany) M Zoecke	6	1^{r}
26	(Socialist Federal Republic of Yugoslavia) G Ivanišević	4	5
24	(Haiti) R Agénor	7^{8}	6
(West Germany) E Jelen	6^{6}	1
Q	(Australia) M Kratzmann	6	2	7^{8}
9	(France) Y Noah	4	6	6^{6}

Third round
8	(United States) J Berger	4	6	6
26	(Socialist Federal Republic of Yugoslavia) G Ivanišević	6	3	4
24	(Haiti) R Agénor	6^{3}	5
Q	(Australia) M Kratzmann	7^{7}	7

Fourth round
8	(United States) J Berger	6	6
Q	(Australia) M Kratzmann	0	1

==== Section 8 ====
First round
(United States) P Chamberlin	6	6
Q	(Brazil) F Roese	4	4
(United States) P Annacone	3	5
(France) G Forget	6	7
(Sweden) M Pernfors	7^{7}	3	4
(United States) J Pugh	6^{1}	6	6
(Switzerland) M Rosset	4	1
Q	(France) F Santoro	6	6

Second round
16	(United States) P Sampras	2	7^{7}	6
(United States) P Chamberlin	6	6^{4}	1
(France) G Forget	6	6	6
17	(Soviet Union) A Chesnokov	7	3	3
32	(France) J-P Fleurian	6	7
(United States) J Pugh	2	5
Q	(France) F Santoro	3	7	2
2	(West Germany) B Becker	6	5	6

Third round
16	(United States) P Sampras	6	6
(France) G Forget	1	3
32	(France) J-P Fleurian	7^{7}	6
2	(West Germany) B Becker	6^{3}	1

Fourth round
16	(United States) P Sampras	5	6	6
32	(France) J-P Fleurian	7	4	1
