= 1991 Lipton International Players Championships =

- Date: March 11–25
- Edition: 7th
- Category: ATP Super 9 (men); Tier I Series (women)
- Surface: Hard / outdoor
- Location: Key Biscayne, Florida, U.S.
- Venue: Tennis Center at Crandon Park

Champions

Men's singles
- (United States) Jim Courier

Women's singles
- (Socialist Federal Republic of Yugoslavia) Monica Seles

Men's doubles
- (South Africa) Wayne Ferreira / (South Africa) Piet Norval

Women's doubles
- (United States) Mary Joe Fernández / (United States) Zina Garrison Jackson
- Miami Open

The 1991 Lipton International Players Championships was a tennis tournament played on outdoor hard courts. It was the 7th edition of the Miami tournament, and was part of the ATP Super 9 of the 1991 ATP Tour, and of the Tier I Series of the 1991 WTA Tour. Both the men's and the women's events took place at the Tennis Center at Crandon Park in Key Biscayne, Florida in the United States, from March 11 through March 25, 1991.

== Finals ==
=== Men's singles ===
(United States) Jim Courier defeated (United States) David Wheaton 4–6, 6–3, 6–4

- It was Jim Courier's 2nd title of the year and his 3rd overall. It was his 2nd Masters title of the year and overall.

=== Women's singles ===
(Socialist Federal Republic of Yugoslavia) Monica Seles defeated (Argentina) Gabriela Sabatini 6–3, 7–5

- It was Aranxta Sánchez Vicario's 1st title of the year and her 7th overall. It was her 1st career Tier I title.

=== Men's doubles ===
(South Africa) Wayne Ferreira / (South Africa) Piet Norval defeated (United States) Ken Flach / (United States) Robert Seguso 5–7, 7–6, 6–2

=== Women's doubles ===
(United States) Mary Joe Fernández / (United States) Zina Garrison Jackson defeated (United States) Gigi Fernández / (Czechoslovakia) Jana Novotná 7–5, 6–2
