= 1990 Lipton International Players Championships – Men's doubles =

Men's doubles
- 1990 Lipton International Players Championships

Final
- Champions: (United States) Rick Leach (United States) Jim Pugh
- Runners-up: (West Germany) Boris Becker (Brazil) Cássio Motta
- Score: 6–4, 3–6, 6–3

Details
- Draw: 48
- Seeds: 16

Events
Singles	men	women
Doubles	men	women
← 1989 ·	Miami Open	· 1991 →

Jakob Hlasek and Anders Järryd were the defending champions, but did not participate together this year. Hlasek partnered Guy Forget, losing in the semifinals. Järryd partnered John Fitzgerald, losing in the second round.

Rick Leach and Jim Pugh won the title, defeating Boris Becker and Cássio Motta 6–4, 3–6, 6–3 in the final.

== Seeds ==
All sixteen seeded teams received byes into the second round.

1. (South Africa) Pieter Aldrich / (South Africa) Danie Visser (second round)
2. (United States) Rick Leach / (United States) Jim Pugh (champions)
3. (Australia) John Fitzgerald / (Sweden) Anders Järryd (second round)
4. (United States) Scott Davis / (United States) David Pate (third round)
5. (Canada) Grant Connell / (Canada) Glenn Michibata (third round)
6. (France) Guy Forget / (Switzerland) Jakob Hlasek (semifinals)
7. (Australia) Darren Cahill / (Australia) Mark Kratzmann (semifinals)
8. (Mexico) Jorge Lozano / (United States) Todd Witsken (third round)
9. (United Kingdom) Neil Broad / (South Africa) Gary Muller (second round)
10. (United States) Kevin Curren / (South Africa) Christo van Rensburg (second round)
11. (United States) Tim Pawsat / (Czechoslovakia) Tomáš Šmíd (second round)
12. (Australia) David Macpherson / (France) Eric Winogradsky (third round)
13. (West Germany) Boris Becker / (Brazil) Cássio Motta (final)
14. (United States) Ken Flach / (Mexico) Leonardo Lavalle (second round)
15. (United States) Kelly Jones / (United States) Robert Van't Hof (third round)
16. (Spain) Javier Sánchez / (Hungary) Balázs Taróczy (second round)

== Draw ==
=== Key ===
- Q = Qualifier
- WC = Wild card
- LL = Lucky loser
- Alt = Alternate
- ITF = ITF entry
- PR = Protected ranking
- SR = Special ranking
- SE = Special exempt
- JE = Junior exempt
- JR = Junior Accelerator Programme entrant
- CO = College Accelerator Programme entrant
- NG = Next Gen Accelerator Program entrant
- w/o = Walkover
- r = Retired
- d = Defaulted

=== Finals ===
Semifinals
7	(Australia) Darren Cahill (Australia) Mark Kratzmann	6^{5}	4
13	(West Germany) Boris Becker (Brazil) Cássio Motta	7^{7}	6
6	(France) Guy Forget (Switzerland) Jakob Hlasek	2	2
2	(United States) Rick Leach (United States) Jim Pugh	6	6

Final
13	(West Germany) Boris Becker (Brazil) Cássio Motta	4	6	3
2	(United States) Rick Leach (United States) Jim Pugh	6	3	6

=== Top half ===
==== Section 1 ====
First round
(United States) S Cannon (United States) G Van Emburgh	4	7^{10}	6^{2}
(Australia) B Dyke (Nigeria) N Odizor	6	6^{8}	7^{7}
(United States) J Canter (United States) B Willenborg	6^{8}	7^{7}	4
(Australia) P Doohan (Australia) L Warder	7^{10}	6^{2}	6
(United States) S DeVries (United States) B Pearce	6	6
(Spain) F Clavet (Sweden) J Windahl	4	3
(Sweden) S Edberg (West Germany) U Riglewski	7	6
(Brazil) M Menezes (United States) D Rostagno	6	1

Second round
1	(South Africa) P Aldrich (South Africa) D Visser	5	6	1
(Australia) B Dyke (Nigeria) N Odizor	7	1	6
(Australia) P Doohan (Australia) L Warder	6^{5}	2
15	(United States) K Jones (United States) R Van't Hof	7^{7}	6
9	(United Kingdom) N Broad (South Africa) G Muller	6	2	2
(United States) S DeVries (United States) B Pearce	4	6	6
(Sweden) S Edberg (West Germany) U Riglewski	3	6^{5}
7	(Australia) D Cahill (Australia) M Kratzmann	6	7^{7}

Third round
(Australia) B Dyke (Nigeria) N Odizor	6	6
15	(United States) K Jones (United States) R Van't Hof	4	4
(United States) S DeVries (United States) B Pearce	1	6	3
7	(Australia) D Cahill (Australia) M Kratzmann	6	4	6

Quarterfinals
(Australia) B Dyke (Nigeria) N Odizor	4	4
7	(Australia) D Cahill (Australia) M Kratzmann	6	6

==== Section 2 ====
First round
(United States) J Berger (United States) B Gilbert	6	7^{7}
(Sweden) J Gunnarsson (West Germany) P Kühnen	4	6^{4}
(Czechoslovakia) K Nováček (Austria) H Skoff	6^{1}	7^{7}	4
(Argentina) M Jaite (Argentina) A Mancini	7^{7}	6^{1}	6
(United States) G Layendecker (United States) R Reneberg	7	3	7^{7}
(United States) M Davis (United States) J Rive	5	6	6^{1}
(Uruguay) M Filippini (Uruguay) D Pérez	6	7^{7}
(United States) C Beckman (United States) L Jensen	4	6^{5}

Second round
4	(United States) S Davis (United States) D Pate	6	6^{2}	6
(United States) J Berger (United States) B Gilbert	3	7^{7}	3
(Argentina) M Jaite (Argentina) A Mancini
13	(West Germany) B Becker (Brazil) C Motta	w/o
11	(United States) T Pawsat (Czechoslovakia) T Šmíd	3	4
(United States) G Layendecker (United States) R Reneberg	6	6
(Uruguay) M Filippini (Uruguay) D Pérez	1	7	3
5	(Canada) G Connell (Canada) G Michibata	6	5	6

Third round
4	(United States) S Davis (United States) D Pate	5	4
13	(West Germany) B Becker (Brazil) C Motta	7	6
(United States) G Layendecker (United States) R Reneberg	6	6
5	(Canada) G Connell (Canada) G Michibata	1	4

Quarterfinals
13	(West Germany) B Becker (Brazil) C Motta	6	6
(United States) G Layendecker (United States) R Reneberg	3	3

=== Bottom half ===
==== Section 3 ====
First round
(Denmark) M Mortensen (Netherlands) T Nijssen	6^{10}	3
(South Africa) R Deppe (South Africa) B Talbot	7^{12}	6
(New Zealand) K Evernden (Venezuela) N Pereira	4	6	1
(United States) T Nelson (The Bahamas) R Smith	6	3	6
(Spain) T Carbonell (Netherlands) M Schapers	6	6
(Ecuador) A Gómez (Socialist Federal Republic of Yugoslavia) S Živojinović	2	4
(Sweden) D Engel (Sweden) F Nilsson	2	3
Q	(Brazil) N Aerts (Brazil) F Roese	6	6

Second round
6	(France) G Forget (Switzerland) J Hlasek	6	7
(South Africa) R Deppe (South Africa) B Talbot	4	5
(United States) T Nelson (The Bahamas) R Smith	6^{4}	4
12	(Australia) D Macpherson (France) E Winogradsky	7^{7}	6
14	(United States) K Flach (Mexico) L Lavalle	2	2
(Spain) T Carbonell (Netherlands) M Schapers	6	6
Q	(Brazil) N Aerts (Brazil) F Roese	7^{8}	7^{7}
3	(Australia) J Fitzgerald (Sweden) A Järryd	6^{6}	6^{4}

Third round
6	(France) G Forget (Switzerland) J Hlasek	7^{7}	6
12	(Australia) D Macpherson (France) E Winogradsky	6^{1}	4
(Spain) T Carbonell (Netherlands) M Schapers	6^{5}	7^{7}	3
Q	(Brazil) N Aerts (Brazil) F Roese	7^{7}	6^{4}	6

Quarterfinals
6	(France) G Forget (Switzerland) J Hlasek	6	6
Q	(Brazil) N Aerts (Brazil) F Roese	3	3

==== Section 4 ====
First round
(Socialist Federal Republic of Yugoslavia) G Ivanišević (Czechoslovakia) P Korda	6	6
(United Kingdom) N Brown (United Kingdom) N Fulwood	3	3
(Spain) S Casal (Spain) E Sánchez	6	6
(France) Y Noah (United States) S Stewart	3	4
(Sweden) R Båthman (Sweden) R Bergh	6	3	6
(United States) P Chamberlin (United States) T Wilkison	4	6	1
Q	(Venezuela) A Mora (United States) B Page	7^{7}	7^{8}
(West Germany) C Saceanu (United States) S Warner	6^{5}	6^{6}

Second round
8	(Mexico) J Lozano (United States) T Witsken	6	6
(Socialist Federal Republic of Yugoslavia) G Ivanišević (Czechoslovakia) P Korda	3	3
(Spain) S Casal (Spain) E Sánchez	6^{4}	7^{7}	6
10	(United States) K Curren (South Africa) C van Rensburg	7^{7}	6^{5}	3
16	(Spain) J Sánchez (Hungary) B Taróczy	7^{13}	4	2
(Sweden) R Båthman (Sweden) R Bergh	6^{11}	6	6
Q	(Venezuela) A Mora (United States) B Page	6	3	2
2	(United States) R Leach (United States) J Pugh	3	6	6

Third round
8	(Mexico) J Lozano (United States) T Witsken	2	2
(Spain) S Casal (Spain) E Sánchez	6	6
(Sweden) R Båthman (Sweden) R Bergh	1	6	1
2	(United States) R Leach (United States) J Pugh	6	3	6

Quarterfinals
(Spain) S Casal (Spain) E Sánchez	6^{4}	3
2	(United States) R Leach (United States) J Pugh	7^{7}	6
