= 1988 Taranto Open =

- Date: 26 April – 1 May
- Edition: 2nd
- Category: Category 1
- Draw: 32S / 16D
- Prize money: $50,000
- Surface: Clay / outdoor
- Location: Taranto, Italy

Champions

Singles
- (Canada) Helen Kelesi

Doubles
- (West Germany) Andrea Betzner / (West Germany) Claudia Porwik
← 1985 ·	Taranto Open	· 1989 →

The 1988 Taranto Open was a women's tennis tournament played on outdoor clay courts in Taranto, Italy and was part of the Category 1 of the 1988 WTA Tour. It was the second edition of the tournament and ran from 26 April until 1 May 1988. First-seeded Helen Kelesi won the singles title.

== Finals ==
=== Singles ===
(Canada) Helen Kelesi defeated (Italy) Laura Garrone 6–1, 6–0

- It was Kelesi's only singles title of the year and the 2nd and last of her career.

=== Doubles ===
(West Germany) Andrea Betzner / (West Germany) Claudia Porwik defeated (Italy) Laura Garrone / (Canada) Helen Kelesi 6–1, 6–2

- It was Betzner's only title of the year and the 2nd of her career. It was Porwik's only title of the year and the 1st of her career.
