= 1990 Lipton International Players Championships =

- Date: March 12–26
- Edition: 6th
- Surface: Hard / outdoor
- Location: Key Biscayne, Florida, U.S.
- Venue: Tennis Center at Crandon Park

Champions

Men's singles
- (United States) Andre Agassi

Women's singles
- (Socialist Federal Republic of Yugoslavia) Monica Seles

Men's doubles
- (United States) Rick Leach / (United States) Jim Pugh

Women's doubles
- (Czechoslovakia) Jana Novotná / (Czechoslovakia) Helena Suková
- Miami Open

The 1990 Lipton International Players Championships was a tennis tournament played on outdoor hard courts. It was the 6th edition of the Miami tournament, and was part of the ATP Championship Series, Single Week category of the 1990 ATP Tour, and of the Tier I Series of the 1990 WTA Tour. Both the men's and the women's events took place at the Tennis Center at Crandon Park in Key Biscayne, Florida in the United States, from March 12 through March 26, 1990.

The men's field was headlined by world No. 1, Australian Open champion, Milan, Toronto indoor, 1989 Key Biscayne winner Ivan Lendl, Brussels titlist, US Open and Wimbledon defending champion Boris Becker and Australian Open finalist, Indian Wells winner Stefan Edberg. Other top players in the field were Rotterdam titlist Brad Gilbert, San Francisco winner Andre Agassi, Aaron Krickstein, Jay Berger and Tim Mayotte.

== Finals ==
=== Men's singles ===
(United States) Andre Agassi defeated (Sweden) Stefan Edberg 6–1, 6–4, 0–6, 6–2

- It was Andre Agassi's 2nd title of the year and his 10th overall. It was his 1st career Masters title.

=== Women's singles ===
(Socialist Federal Republic of Yugoslavia) Monica Seles defeated (Austria) Judith Wiesner 6–1, 6–2

- It was Monica Seles' 1st title of the year and her 2nd overall. It was her 1st career Tier I title.

=== Men's doubles ===
(United States) Rick Leach / (United States) Jim Pugh defeated (Germany) Boris Becker / (Brazil) Cássio Motta 6–4, 3–6, 6–3

=== Women's doubles ===
(Czechoslovakia) Jana Novotná / (Czechoslovakia) Helena Suková defeated (United States) Betsy Nagelsen / (United States) Robin White 6–4, 6–3
