= 1990 Trofeo Ilva-Coppa Mantegazza – Doubles =

Doubles
- 1990 Trofeo Ilva-Coppa Mantegazza

Final
- Champions: (Soviet Union) Elena Brioukhovets (Soviet Union) Eugenia Maniokova
- Runners-up: (Italy) Silvia Farina (Italy) Rita Grande
- Score: 7–6^{(7–4)}, 6–1

Details
- Draw: 16
- Seeds: 4

Events
Singles	Doubles
← 1989 ·	Ilva Trophy	· 1991 →

Sabrina Goleš and Mercedes Paz were the defending champions, but both players chose to compete at Hamburg during the same week, with different partners.

Elena Brioukhovets and Eugenia Maniokova won the title by defeating Silvia Farina and Rita Grande 7–6^{(7–4)}, 6–1 in the final.

== Seeds ==
1. (Italy) Laura Garrone / (Italy) Laura Golarsa (quarterfinals)
2. (United States) Ann Grossman / (Australia) Kristine Radford (semifinals)
3. (Australia) Kate McDonald / (Australia) Lisa O'Neill (first round)
4. (France) Alexia Dechaume / (France) Noëlle van Lottum (quarterfinals)

== Draw ==
=== Key ===
- Q = Qualifier
- WC = Wild card
- LL = Lucky loser
- Alt = Alternate
- SE = Special exempt
- PR = Protected ranking
- ITF = ITF entry
- JE = Junior exempt
- w/o = Walkover
- r = Retired
- d = Defaulted
- SR = Special ranking

=== Draw ===
First round
1	(Italy) L Garrone (Italy) L Golarsa	6	7
(Brazil) C Chabalgoity (Argentina) A Tiezzi	3	6
(Austria) M Maruska (Austria) P Ritter	6	2	2
(Italy) S Farina (Italy) R Grande	3	6	6
4	(France) A Dechaume (France) N van Lottum	6	6
(United Kingdom) S Smith (Netherlands) H ter Riet	2	1
(Sweden) M Ekstrand (Austria) H Sprung	6	6
(Italy) K Piccolini (New Zealand) C Toleafoa	2	2
(Italy) F Bonsignori (Argentina) F Haumüller	3	3
(Australia) K Godridge (Sweden) J Jonerup	6	6
(Soviet Union) E Brioukhovers (Soviet Union) E Maniokova	6	4	6
3	(Australia) K McDonald (Australia) L O'Neill	2	6	2
(Austria) B Reinstadler (Finland) P Thorén	1	6	5
(Czechoslovakia) I Budařová (Czechoslovakia) L Lásková	6	0	7
(Belgium) A Devries (Czechoslovakia) E Švíglerová	2	6	5
2	(United States) A Grossman (Australia) K Radford	6	3	7

Quarterfinals
1	(Italy) L Garrone (Italy) L Golarsa	4	5
(Italy) S Farina (Italy) R Grande	6	7
4	(France) A Dechaume (France) N van Lottum	5	0
(Sweden) M Ekstrand (Austria) H Sprung	7	6
(Australia) K Godridge (Sweden) J Jonerup	6	4
(Soviet Union) E Brioukhovers (Soviet Union) E Maniokova	7	6
(Czechoslovakia) I Budařová (Czechoslovakia) L Lásková	2	2
2	(United States) A Grossman (Australia) K Radford	6	6

Semifinals
(Italy) S Farina (Italy) R Grande	2	6	6
(Sweden) M Ekstrand (Austria) H Sprung	6	3	3
(Soviet Union) E Brioukhovers (Soviet Union) E Maniokova	4	7	6
2	(United States) A Grossman (Australia) K Radford	6	5	1

Final
(Italy) S Farina (Italy) R Grande	6^{4}	1
(Soviet Union) E Brioukhovers (Soviet Union) E Maniokova	7^{7}	6
