= 1991 Lipton International Players Championships – Men's singles =

Men's singles
- 1991 Lipton International Players Championships

Final
- Champion: (United States) Jim Courier
- Runner-up: (United States) David Wheaton
- Score: 4–6, 6–3, 6–4

Events
| Singles | men | women |
| Doubles | men | women |
| ← 1990 · | Miami Open | · 1992 → |

Jim Courier defeated David Wheaton in the final, 4–6, 6–3, 6–4 to win the men's singles tennis title at the 1991 Miami Open.

Andre Agassi was the defending champion, but lost in the fourth round to Wheaton.

== Seeds ==
1. (Sweden) Stefan Edberg (semifinals)
2. (Germany) Boris Becker (third round)
3. (United States) Andre Agassi (fourth round)
4. (France) Guy Forget (fourth round)
5. (United States) Pete Sampras (second round)
6. (Socialist Federal Republic of Yugoslavia) ~~Goran Ivanišević~~ (withdrew)
7. (Spain) Emilio Sánchez (quarterfinals)
8. (Ecuador) Andrés Gómez (second round)
9. (United States) Brad Gilbert (second round)
10. (United States) Michael Chang (fourth round)
11. (Soviet Union) Andrei Cherkasov (second round)
12. (Switzerland) Jakob Hlasek (third round)
13. (United States) Jim Courier (champion)
14. (Argentina) Guillermo Pérez Roldán (second round, retired)
15. (Germany) Michael Stich (fourth round)
16. (Soviet Union) Alexander Volkov (second round)
17. (Switzerland) Marc Rosset (quarterfinals)
18. (Spain) Juan Aguilera (third round)
19. (Czechoslovakia) Karel Nováček (second round)
20. (United States) Aaron Krickstein (second round)
21. (Spain) Sergi Bruguera (fourth round)
22. (United States) Derrick Rostagno (quarterfinals)
23. (France) Henri Leconte (third round)
24. (United States) Richey Reneberg (semifinals)
25. (Australia) Darren Cahill (third round)
26. (Austria) Horst Skoff (third round)
27. (Argentina) Franco Davín (second round, retired)
28. (Italy) Cristiano Caratti (quarterfinals)
29. (Sweden) Magnus Gustafsson (third round)
30. (Argentina) Martín Jaite (second round)
31. (Socialist Federal Republic of Yugoslavia) Goran Prpić (third round)
32. (United States) Patrick McEnroe (fourth round)

== Draw ==
=== Key ===
- Q = Qualifier
- WC = Wild card
- LL = Lucky loser
- Alt = Alternate
- ITF = ITF entry
- PR = Protected ranking
- SR = Special ranking
- SE = Special exempt
- JE = Junior exempt
- JR = Junior Accelerator Programme entrant
- CO = College Accelerator Programme entrant
- NG = Next Gen Accelerator Program entrant
- w/o = Walkover
- r = Retired
- d = Defaulted

=== Finals ===
Quarterfinals
1 | (Sweden) Stefan Edberg | 6 | 7^{8}
7 | (Spain) Emilio Sánchez | 2 | 6^{6}
(United States) David Wheaton | 6^{7} | 6 | 6
28 | (Italy) Cristiano Caratti | 7^{9} | 2 | 0
22 | (United States) Derrick Rostagno | 0 | 3
13 | (United States) Jim Courier | 6 | 6
24 | (United States) Richey Reneberg | 7^{7} | 3 | 6
17 | (Switzerland) Marc Rosset | 6^{3} | 6 | 3

Semifinals
1 | (Sweden) Stefan Edberg | 3 | 4
(United States) David Wheaton | 6 | 6
13 | (United States) Jim Courier | 6 | 6
24 | (United States) Richey Reneberg | 4 | 3

Final
(United States) David Wheaton | 6 | 3 | 4
13 | (United States) Jim Courier | 4 | 6 | 6

=== Top half ===
==== Section 1 ====
First round
Q | (New Zealand) B Derlin | 6 | 6
WC | (United States) H Solomon | 2 | 3
(United States) S Davis | 6^{9} | 4
(South Africa) G Muller | 7^{11} | 6
Q | (United States) A Hombrecher | 3 | 3
(Brazil) J Oncins | 6 | 6
WC | (United States) D Witt | 6 | 7^{7}
(Brazil) C Motta | 1 | 6^{4}

Second round
1 | (Sweden) S Edberg | 6 | 6
Q | (New Zealand) B Derlin | 2 | 3
(South Africa) G Muller | 4 | 0
31 | (Socialist Federal Republic of Yugoslavia) G Prpić | 6 | 6
18 | (Spain) J Aguilera | 6 | 3 | 7
(Brazil) J Oncins | 3 | 6 | 5
WC | (United States) D Witt | 2 | 6 | 2
15 | (Germany) M Stich | 6 | 1 | 6

Third round
1 | (Sweden) S Edberg | 6 | 6
31 | (Socialist Federal Republic of Yugoslavia) G Prpić | 4 | 2
18 | (Spain) J Aguilera | 4 | 2
15 | (Germany) M Stich | 6 | 6

Fourth round
1 | (Sweden) S Edberg | 6 | 2 | 6
15 | (Germany) M Stich | 4 | 6 | 4

==== Section 2 ====
First round
(United States) B Garrow | 4 | 6 | 1
(Peru) J Yzaga | 6 | 3 | 6
(Spain) F Clavet | 4 | 6 | 6
Q | (Italy) S Pescosolido | 6 | 4 | 1
(Finland) V Paloheimo | 6 | 6
(Italy) R Furlan | 2 | 4
Q | (United States) J Tarango | 7 | 6
Q | (Sweden) J Carlsson | 5 | 3

Second round
10 | (United States) M Chang | 6 | 6
(Peru) J Yzaga | 3 | 2
(Spain) F Clavet | 2 | 6 | 4
23 | (France) H Leconte | 6 | 4 | 6
25 | (Australia) D Cahill | 6 | 3 | 6
(Finland) V Paloheimo | 0 | 6 | 1
Q | (United States) J Tarango | 7^{7} | 6^{1} | 3
7 | (Spain) E Sánchez | 6^{3} | 7^{7} | 6

Third round
10 | (United States) M Chang | 4 | 6 | 6
23 | (France) H Leconte | 6 | 3 | 3
25 | (Australia) D Cahill | 6^{6} | 1
7 | (Spain) E Sánchez | 7^{8} | 6

Fourth round
10 | (United States) M Chang | 7 | 3 | 4
7 | (Spain) E Sánchez | 5 | 6 | 6

==== Section 3 ====
First round
(France) G Raoux | 6 | 2 | 6^{5}
(France) F Santoro | 2 | 6 | 7^{7}
(Germany) A Mronz | 4 | 6 | 3
(United States) T Witsken | 6 | 1 | 6
(Czechoslovakia) M Vajda | 3 | 1
(United States) K Curren | 6 | 6
(United States) D Wheaton | 6 | 3 | 6
(United States) J Grabb | 3 | 6 | 1

Second round
3 | (United States) A Agassi | 7^{7} | 4 | 7
(France) F Santoro | 6^{1} | 6 | 5
(United States) T Witsken | 3 | 6 | 1
29 | (Sweden) M Gustafsson | 6 | 2 | 6
20 | (United States) A Krickstein | 2 | 4
(United States) K Curren | 6 | 6
(United States) D Wheaton | 4
14 | (Argentina) G Pérez Roldán | 4^{r}

Third round
3 | (United States) A Agassi | 6^{6} | 6 | 7
29 | (Sweden) M Gustafsson | 7^{8} | 2 | 5
(United States) K Curren | 6 | 6^{4} | 5
(United States) D Wheaton | 0 | 7^{7} | 7

Fourth round
3 | (United States) A Agassi | 0 | 5
(United States) D Wheaton | 6 | 7

==== Section 4 ====
First round
(Germany) C-U Steeb | 2 | 2
(Portugal) N Marques | 6 | 6
(Israel) G Bloom | 6 | 3 | 6^{4}
Q | (France) A Boetsch | 3 | 6 | 7^{7}
(Germany) U Riglewski | 4 | 4
WC | (United States) J Connors | 6 | 6
(France) T Champion | 6^{0} | 1
LL | (France) R Gilbert | 7^{7} | 6

Second round
12 | (Switzerland) J Hlasek | 7 | 6
(Portugal) N Marques | 5 | 3
Q | (France) A Boetsch | 4 | 6^{5}
21 | (Spain) S Bruguera | 6 | 7^{7}
28 | (Italy) C Caratti | 6 | 6
WC | (United States) J Connors | 4 | 3
LL | (France) R Gilbert | 6 | 6
5 | (United States) P Sampras | 4 | 2

Third round
12 | (Switzerland) J Hlasek | 1 | 2
21 | (Spain) S Bruguera | 6 | 6
28 | (Italy) C Caratti | 6 | 4 | 6
LL | (France) R Gilbert | 4 | 6 | 3

Fourth round
21 | (Spain) S Bruguera | 7^{7} | 3 | 6^{3}
28 | (Italy) C Caratti | 6^{4} | 6 | 7^{7}

=== Bottom half ===
==== Section 5 ====
First round
(Uruguay) M Filippini | 3 | 6 | 0
(Spain) J Sánchez | 6 | 2 | 6
(Argentina) H de la Peña | 3 | r
Q | (South Africa) W Ferreira | 6
(Sweden) P Lundgren | 4 | 4
(India) R Krishnan | 6 | 6
(United States) M Washington | 5 | 2
(United States) T Mayotte | 7 | 6

Second round
LL | (Spain) F Roig | 6^{2} | 2
(Spain) J Sánchez | 7^{7} | 6
Q | (South Africa) W Ferreira | 7^{7} | 1
27 | (Argentina) F Davín | 6^{5} | 0^{r}
22 | (United States) D Rostagno | 6^{5} | 6 | 6
(India) R Krishnan | 7^{7} | 4 | 3
(United States) T Mayotte | 6 | 6
11 | (Soviet Union) A Cherkasov | 4 | 1

Third round
(Spain) J Sánchez | 1 | 3
Q | (South Africa) W Ferreira | 6 | 6
22 | (United States) D Rostagno | 6^{4} | 6 | 6
(United States) T Mayotte | 7^{7} | 4 | 3

Fourth round
Q | (South Africa) W Ferreira | 3 | 6 | 4
22 | (United States) D Rostagno | 6 | 1 | 6

==== Section 6 ====
First round
(United States) B Pearce | 3 | 0
(Mexico) L Herrera | 6 | 6
(Netherlands) P Haarhuis | 6 | 6
(Australia) M Kratzmann | 3 | 2
(United States) J Arias | 1 | 6 | 6
(France) J-P Fleurian | 6 | 4 | 3
(Canada) A Sznajder | 5 | 7^{7} | 3
(United States) D Goldie | 7 | 6^{4} | 6

Second round
13 | (United States) J Courier | 7^{7} | 3 | 6
(Mexico) L Herrera | 6^{5} | 6 | 3
(Netherlands) P Haarhuis | 6 | 6
19 | (Czechoslovakia) K Nováček | 4 | 4
30 | (Argentina) M Jaite | 6^{3} | 6^{1}
(United States) J Arias | 7^{7} | 7^{7}
(United States) D Goldie | 1 | 3
4 | (France) G Forget | 6 | 6

Third round
13 | (United States) J Courier | 7 | 3 | 6
(Netherlands) P Haarhuis | 5 | 6 | 3
(United States) J Arias | 1 | 1
4 | (France) G Forget | 6 | 6

Fourth round
13 | (United States) J Courier | 7^{7} | 6
4 | (France) G Forget | 6^{3} | 3

==== Section 7 ====
First round
(Sweden) T Högstedt | 2 | 0
(Spain) T Carbonell | 6 | 6
(Sweden) J Gunnarsson | 6 | 6
Q | (United States) C Garner | 2 | 2
(Netherlands) R Krajicek | 6 | 3 | 2
(Czechoslovakia) P Korda | 1 | 6 | 6
(Australia) J Stoltenberg | 6^{6} | 6 | 6^{6}
Q | (Netherlands) J Siemerink | 7^{8} | 3 | 7^{8}

Second round
8 | (Ecuador) A Gómez | 4 | 6 | 4
(Spain) T Carbonell | 6 | 2 | 6
(Sweden) J Gunnarsson | 2 | 0
26 | (Austria) H Skoff | 6 | 6
24 | (United States) R Reneberg | 6^{5} | 7^{7} | 6
(Czechoslovakia) P Korda | 7^{7} | 6^{3} | 3
Q | (Netherlands) J Siemerink | 6^{5} | 6 | 6
9 | (United States) B Gilbert | 7 | 4 | 3

Third round
(Spain) T Carbonell | 0 | 6 | 6
26 | (Austria) H Skoff | 6 | 1 | 2
24 | (United States) R Reneberg | 7^{7} | 6
Q | (Netherlands) J Siemerink | 6^{5} | 4

Fourth round
(Spain) T Carbonell | 6^{1} | 6^{3}
24 | (United States) R Reneberg | 7^{7} | 7^{7}

==== Section 8 ====
First round
(New Zealand) K Evernden | 6 | 1 | 2
Q | (Japan) S Matsuoka | 3 | 6 | 6
LL | (Germany) P Baur | 7^{7} | 6
(Brazil) L Mattar | 6^{1} | 3
(Canada) G Connell | 4 | 4
Q | (United States) K Jones | 6 | 6
(Finland) A Rahunen | 3 | 2
Q | (United States) S DeVries | 6 | 6

Second round
16 | (Soviet Union) A Volkov | 3 | 5
Q | (Japan) S Matsuoka | 6 | 7
LL | (Germany) P Baur | 4 | 4
17 | (Switzerland) M Rosset | 6 | 6
32 | (United States) P McEnroe | 7 | 6
Q | (United States) K Jones | 5 | 0
Q | (United States) S DeVries | 7 | 3 | 6^{5}
2 | (Germany) B Becker | 5 | 6 | 7^{7}

Third round
Q | (Japan) S Matsuoka | 4 | 4
17 | (Switzerland) M Rosset | 6 | 6
32 | (United States) P McEnroe | 6 | 6
2 | (Germany) B Becker | 1 | 4

Fourth round
17 | (Switzerland) M Rosset | 7^{7} | 6
32 | (United States) P McEnroe | 6^{4} | 1
