= 1990 Trofeo Ilva-Coppa Mantegazza =

- Date: 1–6 May
- Edition: 4th
- Category: Tier V
- Draw: 32S / 16D
- Prize money: $75,000
- Surface: Clay / outdoor
- Location: Taranto, Italy

Champions

Singles
- (Italy) Raffaella Reggi

Doubles
- (Soviet Union) Elena Brioukhovets (Soviet Union) Eugenia Maniokova
← 1989 ·	Ilva Trophy	· 1991 →

The 1990 Trofeo Ilva-Coppa Mantegazza was a women's tennis tournament played on outdoor clay courts in Taranto, Italy that was part of the WTA Tier V category of the 1990 WTA Tour. It was the fourth edition of the tournament and was held from 1 May until 6 May 1990. First-seeded Raffaella Reggi won the singles title.

== Finals ==
=== Singles ===
(Italy) Raffaella Reggi defeated (France) Alexia Dechaume 3–6, 6–0, 6–2

- It was Reggi's 1st singles title of the year and the 5th and last of her career.

=== Doubles ===
(Soviet Union) Elena Brioukhovets / (Soviet Union) Eugenia Maniokova defeated (Italy) Silvia Farina / (Italy) Rita Grande 7–6^{(7–4)}, 6–1
