= 1991 Trofeo Ilva-Coppa Mantegazza =

- Date: 30 April – 5 May
- Edition: 5th
- Category: Tier V
- Draw: 32S / 16D
- Prize money: $100,000
- Surface: Clay / outdoor
- Location: Taranto, Italy
- Venue: Circulo Tennis Ilva Taranto

Champions

Singles
- (Switzerland) Emanuela Zardo

Doubles
- (France) Alexia Dechaume / (Argentina) Florencia Labat
← 1990 ·	Ilva Trophy	· 1992 →

The 1991 Trofeo Ilva-Coppa Mantegazza was a women's tennis tournament played on outdoor clay courts at the Circulo Tennis Ilva Taranto in Taranto, Italy that was part of the WTA Tier V category of the 1991 WTA Tour. It was the fifth edition of the tournament and was held from 30 April until 5 May 1991. Unseeded Emanuela Zardo won the singles title and earned $18,000 first-prize money.

== Finals ==
=== Singles ===
(Switzerland) Emanuela Zardo defeated (Austria) Petra Ritter 7–5, 6–2

- It was Zardo's only singles title of her career.

=== Doubles ===
(France) Alexia Dechaume / (Argentina) Florencia Labat defeated (Italy) Laura Golarsa / (United States) Ann Grossman 6–2, 7–5
