= 1991 Lipton International Players Championships – Men's doubles =

Men's doubles
- 1991 Lipton International Players Championships

Final
- Champion: (South Africa) Wayne Ferreira (South Africa) Piet Norval
- Runner-up: (United States) Ken Flach (United States) Robert Seguso
- Score: 5–7, 7–6, 6–2

Events
Singles	men	women
Doubles	men	women
← 1990 ·	Miami Open	· 1992 →

Rick Leach and Jim Pugh were the defending champions, but lost in the third round this year.

Wayne Ferreira and Piet Norval won the title, defeating Ken Flach and Robert Seguso 5–7, 7–6, 6–2 in the final.

== Seeds ==
1. (United States) Scott Davis / (United States) David Pate (quarterfinals)
2. (Spain) Sergio Casal / (Spain) Emilio Sánchez (quarterfinals)
3. (United States) Rick Leach / (United States) Jim Pugh (third round)
4. (Germany) Udo Riglewski / (Germany) Michael Stich (second round)
5. (South Africa) Pieter Aldrich / (South Africa) Danie Visser (quarterfinals)
6. (Australia) Darren Cahill / (Australia) Mark Kratzmann (third round)
7. (France) Guy Forget / (Switzerland) Jakob Hlasek (second round)
8. (Canada) Grant Connell / (Canada) Glenn Michibata (second round, retired)
9. (United States) Jim Grabb / (United States) Patrick McEnroe (second round)
10. (United States) Patrick Galbraith / (United States) Todd Witsken (second round)
11. (Australia) John Fitzgerald / (United States) Kelly Jones (second round)
12. N/A
13. (Australia) Jason Stoltenberg / (United States) David Wheaton (semifinals)
14. (United Kingdom) Neil Broad / (United States) Kevin Curren (semifinals)
15. (Australia) Broderick Dyke / (Sweden) Peter Lundgren (second round)
16. (United States) Brian Garrow / (United States) Brad Pearce (third round)

== Draw ==
=== Key ===
- Q = Qualifier
- WC = Wild card
- LL = Lucky loser
- Alt = Alternate
- ITF = ITF entry
- PR = Protected ranking
- SR = Special ranking
- SE = Special exempt
- JE = Junior exempt
- JR = Junior Accelerator Programme entrant
- CO = College Accelerator Programme entrant
- NG = Next Gen Accelerator Program entrant
- w/o = Walkover
- r = Retired
- d = Defaulted

=== Finals ===
Semifinals
(South Africa) Wayne Ferreira (South Africa) Piet Norval	6	4	6
13	(Australia) Jason Stoltenberg (United States) David Wheaton	4	6	3
14	(United Kingdom) Neil Broad (United States) Kevin Curren	5	7	3
(United States) Ken Flach (United States) Robert Seguso	7	5	6

Final
(South Africa) Wayne Ferreira (South Africa) Piet Norval	5	7	6
(United States) Ken Flach (United States) Robert Seguso	7	6	2

=== Top half ===
==== Section 1 ====
First round
(United States) S DeVries (Australia) D Macpherson	6	2	6
WC	(United States) J Sobel (United States) T Wilkison	2	6	3
(Germany) B Becker (Socialist Federal Republic of Yugoslavia) S Živojinović	7	7
(Sweden) S Edberg (United States) S Salumaa	5	6
(South Africa) G Muller (United States) R Reneberg	2	r
(South Africa) W Ferreira (South Africa) P Norval	6
(Brazil) N Aerts (Mexico) L Lavalle	6	3	7
(Argentina) G Luza (Brazil) L Mattar	3	6	5

Second round
1	(United States) S Davis (United States) D Pate	7	7
(United States) S DeVries (Australia) D Macpherson	6	6
(Germany) B Becker (Socialist Federal Republic of Yugoslavia) S Živojinović	6	6	7
15	(Australia) B Dyke (Sweden) P Lundgren	7	4	6
9	(United States) J Grabb (United States) P McEnroe	4	7	2
(South Africa) W Ferreira (South Africa) P Norval	6	6	6
(Brazil) N Aerts (Mexico) L Lavalle	6	2
8	(Canada) G Connell (Canada) G Michibata	4	1^{r}

Third round
1	(United States) S Davis (United States) D Pate	5	6	6
(Germany) B Becker (Socialist Federal Republic of Yugoslavia) S Živojinović	7	4	3
(South Africa) W Ferreira (South Africa) P Norval	6	3	6
(Brazil) N Aerts (Mexico) L Lavalle	2	6	3

Quarterfinals
1	(United States) S Davis (United States) D Pate	2	2
(South Africa) W Ferreira (South Africa) P Norval	6	6

==== Section 2 ====
First round
(Sweden) R Båthman (Sweden) R Bergh	7	6
(Brazil) F Roese (Spain) F Roig	6	3
(South Africa) S Kruger (Australia) L Warder	4	6	6
(United States) J Canter (Venezuela) A Mora	6	4	7
(Ecuador) A Gómez (Uruguay) D Pérez	1	6	6
(United States) T Nelson (United States) G Van Emburgh	6	1	2
(Spain) F Clavet (Spain) J Sánchez	6	6
(Argentina) P Albano (Nigeria) N Odizor	3	4

Second round
4	(Germany) U Riglewski (Germany) M Stich	3	6	5
(Sweden) R Båthman (Sweden) R Bergh	6	3	7
(United States) J Canter (Venezuela) A Mora	3	6
13	(Australia) J Stoltenberg (United States) D Wheaton	6	7
11	(Australia) J Fitzgerald (United States) K Jones	6	3
(Ecuador) A Gómez (Uruguay) D Pérez	7	6
(Spain) F Clavet (Spain) J Sánchez	3	4
6	(Australia) D Cahill (Australia) M Kratzmann	6	6

Third round
(Sweden) R Båthman (Sweden) R Bergh	6	6	4
13	(Australia) J Stoltenberg (United States) D Wheaton	4	7	6
(Ecuador) A Gómez (Uruguay) D Pérez	3	6	6
6	(Australia) D Cahill (Australia) M Kratzmann	6	3	4

Quarterfinals
13	(Australia) J Stoltenberg (United States) D Wheaton	6	6
(Ecuador) A Gómez (Uruguay) D Pérez	4	2

=== Bottom half ===
==== Section 3 ====
First round
(Spain) T Carbonell (United States) G Layendecker	6	3	1
(Argentina) J Frana (Brazil) C Motta	1	6	6
(Czechoslovakia) K Nováček (Belgium) L Pimek	6	6
(Netherlands) T Nijssen (Czechoslovakia) C Suk	4	4
(United States) K Kinnear (United States) B Shelton	6	3	6
WC	(Australia) J Morgan (Australia) S Stolle	3	6	0
(Italy) D Nargiso (Czechoslovakia) T Šmíd	1	6	7
LL	(United States) B Garnett (Kenya) P Wekesa	6	3	6

Second round
5	(South Africa) P Aldrich (South Africa) D Visser	6	6
(Argentina) J Frana (Brazil) C Motta	3	3
(Czechoslovakia) K Nováček (Belgium) L Pimek	6	7
Q	(United States) M Davis (United States) J Rive	4	6
14	(United Kingdom) N Broad (United States) K Curren	6	6
(United States) K Kinnear (United States) B Shelton	3	3
(Italy) D Nargiso (Czechoslovakia) T Šmíd	5	6
3	(United States) R Leach (United States) J Pugh	7	7

Third round
5	(South Africa) P Aldrich (South Africa) D Visser	7	6
(Czechoslovakia) K Nováček (Belgium) L Pimek	6	2
14	(United Kingdom) N Broad (United States) K Curren	7	7
3	(United States) R Leach (United States) J Pugh	6	5

Quarterfinals
5	(South Africa) P Aldrich (South Africa) D Visser	2	4
14	(United Kingdom) N Broad (United States) K Curren	6	6

==== Section 4 ====
First round
(United States) J Courier (United States) L Jensen	6	4
(United States) K Flach (United States) R Seguso	7	6
(United States) C Beckman (United States) S Cannon	4	6	6
(Netherlands) HJ Davids (Netherlands) P Haarhuis	6	4	7
(New Zealand) K Evernden (Venezuela) N Pereira	6	6
(The Bahamas) R Smith (Sweden) T Svantesson	3	4
Q	(South Africa) B Talbot (Australia) S Youl	6	7
(United States) J Brown (United States) S Melville	4	6

Second round
7	(France) G Forget (Switzerland) J Hlasek	6	3
(United States) K Flach (United States) R Seguso	7	6
(Netherlands) HJ Davids (Netherlands) P Haarhuis	6	6	6
10	(United States) P Galbraith (United States) T Witsken	4	7	4
16	(United States) B Garrow (United States) B Pearce	6	7
(New Zealand) K Evernden (Venezuela) N Pereira	0	6
Q	(South Africa) B Talbot (Australia) S Youl	4	3
2	(Spain) S Casal (Spain) E Sánchez	6	6

Third round
(United States) K Flach (United States) R Seguso	6	7
(Netherlands) HJ Davids (Netherlands) P Haarhuis	4	5
16	(United States) B Garrow (United States) B Pearce	3	3
2	(Spain) S Casal (Spain) E Sánchez	6	6

Quarterfinals
(United States) K Flach (United States) R Seguso	6	6
2	(Spain) S Casal (Spain) E Sánchez	3	4
