= 1990 Lipton International Players Championships – Women's doubles =

Women's doubles
- 1990 Lipton International Players Championships

Final
- Champions: (Czech Republic) Jana Novotná (Czech Republic) Helena Suková
- Runners-up: (United States) Betsy Nagelsen (United States) Robin White
- Score: 2–6, 6–4, 6–4

Details
- Draw: 48
- Seeds: 15

Events
Singles	men	women
Doubles	men	women
- Miami Open

Jana Novotná and Helena Suková were the defending champions and successfully defended their title, defeating Betsy Nagelsen and Robin White in the final, 2–6, 6–4, 6–4.

== Seeds ==
1. (Czechoslovakia) Jana Novotná / (Czechoslovakia) Helena Suková (champions)
2. (United States) Katrina Adams / (United States) Lori McNeil (semifinal)
3. n/a
4. (United States) Kathy Jordan / (Australia) Elizabeth Smylie (quarterfinal)
5. (United States) Betsy Nagelsen / (United States) Robin White (final)
6. (United States) Elise Burgin / (South Africa) Rosalyn Fairbank-Nideffer (semifinal)
7. (United States) Mary-Lou Daniels / (United States) Wendy White (second round)
8. (Netherlands) Manon Bollegraf / (Argentina) Mercedes Paz (third round)
9. (Netherlands) Brenda Schultz / (Hungary) Andrea Temesvári-Trunkos (second round)
10. (Italy) Raffaella Reggi / (South Africa) Elna Reinach (second round)
11. (Canada) Jill Hetherington / (Australia) Wendy Turnbull (second round)
12. (South Africa) Lise Gregory / (United States) Gretchen Rush (quarterfinal)
13. (France) Nathalie Tauziat / (Austria) Judith Wiesner (second round)
14. (West Germany) Eva Pfaff / (United States) Anne Smith (third round)
15. (United States) Penny Barg / (United States) Mareen Louie-Harper (third round)
16. (Switzerland) Manuela Maleeva-Fragniere / (Soviet Union) Larisa Savchenko (quarterfinal)

== Draw ==
Key

- Q = Qualifier
- WC = Wild card
- LL = Lucky loser
- Alt = Alternate
- ITF = ITF entry
- PR = Protected ranking
- SR = Special ranking
- SE = Special exempt
- JE = Junior exempt
- JR = Junior Accelerator Programme entrant
- CO = College Accelerator Programme entrant
- NG = Next Gen Accelerator Program entrant
- w/o = Walkover
- r = Retired
- d = Defaulted

=== Finals ===
Quarterfinals
1	(Czechoslovakia) Jana Novotná (Czechoslovakia) Helena Suková	2	6	6
12	(South Africa) Lise Gregory (United States) Gretchen Rush	6	3	2
4	(United States) Kathy Jordan (Australia) Elizabeth Smylie	5	3
6	(United States) Elise Burgin (South Africa) Rosalyn Fairbank-Nideffer	7	6
5	(United States) Betsy Nagelsen (United States) Robin White	6	6
(Canada) Carling Bassett-Seguso (United States) Ann Grossman	3	2
16	(Switzerland) Manuela Maleeva-Fragniere (Soviet Union) Larisa Savchenko	5	6	6
2	(United States) Katrina Adams (United States) Lori McNeil	7	2	7

Semifinals
1	(Czechoslovakia) Jana Novotná (Czechoslovakia) Helena Suková	6	7
6	(United States) Elise Burgin (South Africa) Rosalyn Fairbank-Nideffer	4	6
5	(United States) Betsy Nagelsen (United States) Robin White	2	6	6
2	(United States) Katrina Adams (United States) Lori McNeil	6	4	4

Final
1	(Czechoslovakia) Jana Novotná (Czechoslovakia) Helena Suková	6	6
5	(United States) Betsy Nagelsen (United States) Robin White	4	3

=== Top half ===
==== Section 1 ====
First round
(Sweden) L Barnard (United States) R Reis	4	6	6
(Sweden) C Lindqvist (Australia) A Minter	6	3	3
(France) S Amiach (France) N Herreman	7	7
(United States) J Fuchs (Sweden) M Strandlund	5	6
(Argentina) G Castro (Spain) C Martínez	6	1	7
(Australia) H Mandlikova (United States) K Rinaldi	2	6	5
(Netherlands) I Driehuis (United States) A May	2	3
(Argentina) Florencia Labat (Bulgaria) E Pampoulova	6	6

Second round
1	(Czechoslovakia) J Novotná (Czechoslovakia) H Suková	6	7
(South Africa) L Barnard (United States) R Reis	1	6
(France) S Amiach (France) N Herreman	6	3	6
10	(Italy) R Reggi (South Africa) E Reinach	4	6	1
12	(South Africa) L Gregory (United States) G Rush	6	6
(Argentina) G Castro (Spain) C Martínez	4	4
(Argentina) F Labat (Bulgaria) E Pampoulova	4	3
8	(Netherlands) M Bollegraf (Argentina) M Paz	6	6

Third round
1	(Czechoslovakia) J Novotná (Czechoslovakia) H Suková	6	6
(France) S Amiach (France) N Herreman	3	4
12	(South Africa) L Gregory (United States) G Rush	2	6	6
8	(Netherlands) M Bollegraf (Argentina) M Paz	6	3	3

Quarterfinals
1	(Czechoslovakia) Jana Novotná (Czechoslovakia) Helena Suková	2	6	6
(South Africa) Lise Gregory (United States) Gretchen Rush	6	3	2

==== Section 2 ====
First round
(Czechoslovakia) E Sviglerova (Czechoslovakia) R Zrubáková	3	2
(Japan) E Inoue (Peru) P Vásquez	6	6
(United States) L Antonoplis (United States) K Foxworth	6	6
(Argentina) B Fulco (Japan) N Miyagi	3	2
(United States) T Phelps (West Germany) W Probst	4	6	6
(United States) C Benjamin (South Africa) K Schimper	6	4	1
(United States) J Capriati (South Africa) R Fairbank-Nideffer	6	6
(United States) L Spadea (United States) J Thomas	2	3

Second round
4	(United States) K Jordan (Australia) E Smylie	6	6
(Japan) E Inoue (Peru) P Vásquez	3	3
(United States) L Antonoplis (United States) K Foxworth	2	4
14	(West Germany) E Pfaff (United States) A Smith	6	6
15	(United States) P Barg (United States) M Louie-Harper	7	6
(United States) T Phelps (West Germany) W Probst	6	1
(United States) J Capriati (United States) M McGrath	2	6	4
6	(United States) E Burgin (South Africa) R Fairbank-Nideffer	6	4	6

Third round
4	(United States) K Jordan (Australia) E Smylie	6	7	6
14	(United States) T Phelps (West Germany) W Probst	7	5	3
15	(United States) P Barg (United States) M Louie-Harper	2	3
14	(United States) E Burgin (South Africa) R Fairbank-Nideffer	6	6

Quarterfinals
4	(United States) Kathy Jordan (Australia) Elizabeth Smylie	5	3
6	(United States) Elise Burgin (South Africa) Rosalyn Fairbank-Nideffer	7	6

=== Bottom half ===
==== Section 3 ====
First round
(New Zealand) B Cordwell (United Kingdom) J Durie	7	6
(Sweden) M Lindstrom (United States) H Ludloff	5	2
(United States) C MacGregor (West Germany) C Porwik	6	5	7
(Czechoslovakia) R Rajchrtová (Czechoslovakia) J Pospisilova	2	7	5
(United States) B Bowes (United States) A Grousbeck	1	2
(Canada) C Bassett-Seguso (United States) A Grossman	6	6
(Soviet Union) E Brioukhovets (Soviet Union) N Medvedeva	4	6	7
(United States) A Henricksson (South Africa) D Van Rensburg	6	4	6

Second round
5	(United States) B Nagelsen (United States) R White	6	6
(New Zealand) B Cordwell (United Kingdom) J Durie	4	4
(United States) C MacGregor (West Germany) C Porwik	6	6	6
13	(France) N Tauziat (Austria) J Wiesner	7	4	3
9	(Netherlands) B Schultz (Hungary) A Temesvári-Trunkos	6	2	3
(Canada) C Bassett-Seguso (United States) A Grossman	3	6	6
(Soviet Union) E Brioukhovets (Soviet Union) N Medvedeva	6	0	6
(Poland) R Baranski (Brazil) T Zambrzycki	1	6	2

Third round
(New Zealand) B Cordwell (United Kingdom) J Durie	6	6
(United States) C MacGregor (West Germany) C Porwik	2	3
(Canada) C Bassett-Seguso (United States) A Grossman	7	6
(Soviet Union) E Brioukhovets (Soviet Union) N Medvedeva	5	3

Quarterfinals
5	(United States) Betsy Nagelsen (United States) Robin White	6	6
(Canada) Carling Bassett-Seguso (United States) Ann Grossman	3	2

==== Section 4 ====
First round
(France) I Demongeot (France) C Tanvier	6	6
(United States) L Allen (Peru) L Gildemeister	2	2
(United States) S Collins (United States) J Smoller	5	6	6
(Italy) L Garrone (Italy) B Romanò	7	3	1
(United States) E De Lone (United States) A Keller	3	4
(Canada) H Kelesi (Socialist Federal Republic of Yugoslavia) M Seles	6	6
(United States) D Faber (United States) S Stafford	7	6
(Brazil) L Corsato-Owsianka (Argentina) A Villagran-Reami	5	2

Second round
7	(United States) M Daniels (United States) W White	6	6	2
(France) I Demongeot (France) C Tanvier	7	4	6
(United States) S Collins (United States) J Smoller	3	6	2
16	(Switzerland) M Maleeva-Fragniere (Soviet Union) L Savchenko	6	4	6
11	(Canada) J Hetherington (Australia) W Turnbull	3	6	4
(Canada) H Kelesi (Socialist Federal Republic of Yugoslavia) M Seles	6	2	7
(United States) D Faber (United States) S Stafford	4	3
2	(United States) K Adams (United States) L McNeil	6	6

Third round
(France) I Demongeot (France) C Tanvier	3	6	4
16	(Switzerland) M Maleeva-Fragniere (Soviet Union) L Savchenko	6	4	6
(Canada) H Kelesi (Socialist Federal Republic of Yugoslavia) M Seles	4	4
2	(United States) K Adams (United States) L McNeil	6	6

Quarterfinals
16	(Switzerland) Manuela Maleeva-Fragniere (Soviet Union) Larisa Savchenko	5	6	6
2	(United States) Katrina Adams (United States) Lori McNeil	7	2	7
