= 1989 Mantegazza Cup =

- Date: 1–7 May
- Edition: 3rd
- Category: 1
- Draw: 32S / 16D
- Prize money: $50,000
- Surface: Clay / outdoor
- Location: Taranto, Italy

Champions

Singles
- (France) Karine Quentrec

Doubles
- (Socialist Federal Republic of Yugoslavia) Sabrina Goleš / (Argentina) Mercedes Paz
| ← 1988 · | Mantegazza Cup | · 1990 → |

The 1989 Mantegazza Cup was a women's tennis tournament played on outdoor clay courts in Taranto, Italy that was part of the Category 1 tier of the 1989 WTA Tour. It was the third edition of the tournament and was held from 1 May until 7 May 1989. Unseeded Karine Quentrec won the singles title.

== Finals ==
=== Singles ===
(France) Karine Quentrec defeated (Italy) Cathy Caverzasio 6–3, 5–7, 6–3

- It was Quentrec's only singles title of her career.

=== Doubles ===
(Socialist Federal Republic of Yugoslavia) Sabrina Goleš / (Argentina) Mercedes Paz defeated (France) Sophie Amiach / (France) Emmanuelle Derly 6–2, 6–2

- It was Goleš' only title of the year and the 4th of her career. It was Paz's 1st title of the year and the 13th of her career.
