= Karine Quentrec =

French tennis player

- Full name: Karine Quentrec Eagle
- Country (sports): France
- Born: 21 October 1969 (age 55); Marseille, France
- Turned pro: 1985
- Retired: 1997
- Prize money: $323,690

Singles
- Career record: 129–133
- Career titles: 1 WTA, 3 ITF
- Highest ranking: No. 45 (11 October 1991)

Grand Slam singles results
- Australian Open: 2R (1991)
- French Open: 3R (1989, 1991)
- Wimbledon: 2R (1988, 1989, 1990, 1991)
- US Open: 2R (1993)

Doubles
- Career record: 37–61
- Career titles: 5 ITF
- Highest ranking: No. 110 (18 July 1994)

Grand Slam doubles results
- Australian Open: 2R (1995)
- French Open: 2R (1996)
- Wimbledon: 1R (1994)
- US Open: 1R (1994)

Karine Quentrec Eagle (born 21 October 1969) is a former professional tennis player from France who competed on the WTA Tour from 1985 to 1996.

She attained a career-high ranking of No. 46 in January 1992. During her career, she reached the third round of the French Open twice and won one WTA singles title.

== WTA career finals ==
=== Singles: 1 (runner-up) ===
Result	Date	Tournament	Tier	Surface	Opponent	Score
Win	May 1989	Ilva Trophy, Italy	Category 1	Clay	(Italy) Cathy Caverzasio	6–3, 5–7, 6–3

== ITF finals ==
Legend
$25,000 tournaments
$10,000 tournaments

=== Singles (3–1) ===
Result	No.	Date	Tournament	Surface	Opponent	Score
Loss	1.	17 November 1986	ITF Croydon, United Kingdom	Carpet (i)	(Netherlands) Simone Schilder	4–6, 4–6
Win	2.	26 October 1987	ITF Cheshire, United Kingdom	Carpet (i)	(West Germany) Martina Pawlik	6–2, 6–4
Win	3.	11 January 1988	ITF Moulins, France	Clay (i)	(France) Nathalie Herreman	6–1, 6–2
Win	4.	18 January 1988	ITF Dunkerque, France	Clay (i)	(Netherlands) Nicolette Rooimans	6–1, 4–3 ret.

=== Doubles (5–2) ===
Result	No.	Date	Tournament	Surface	Partner	Opponents	Score
Loss	1.	21 July 1986	ITF Subiaco, Italy	Hard	(France) Nathalie Ballet	(Italy) Stefania Dalla Valle (Italy) Linda Ferrando	2–6, 6–0, 1–6
Loss	2.	16 February 1987	ITF Mald, France	Clay (i)	(France) Virginie Paquet	(Belgium) Kathleen Schuurmans (United States) Erika Smith	3–6, 2–6
Win	3.	11 January 1988	ITF Moulins, France	Clay	(France) Nathalie Herreman	(United Kingdom) Caroline Billingham (United Kingdom) Anne Simpkin	6–3, 6–3
Win	4.	24 January 1988	ITF Denain, France	Clay	(France) Virginie Paquet	(United States) Liz Burris (Republic of Ireland) Lesley O'Halloran	6–3, 6–1
Win	5.	2 October 1995	ITF Lerida, Spain	Clay	(Spain) Virginia Ruano Pascual	(Spain) Patricia Aznar (Spain) Eva Bes	7–6^{(5)}, 6–0
Win	6.	6 May 1996	ITF Le Touquet, France	Clay	(France) Nathalie Herreman	(Belgium) Patty Van Acker (Russia) Anna Linkova	6–1, 6–1
Win	7.	19 May 1996	ITF Bordeaux, France	Clay	(France) Anne-Gaëlle Sidot	(Belarus) Olga Barabanschikova (Italy) Alice Canepa	6–2, 6–3
