= Laura Lapi =

Italian tennis player

- Full name: Laura Lapi
- Country (sports): Italy
- Born: 10 September 1970 (age 54)
- Prize money: $138,991

Singles
- Career record: 154–96
- Career titles: 6 ITF
- Highest ranking: No. 66 (9 April 1990)

Grand Slam singles results
- French Open: 3R (1990)
- Wimbledon: 1R (1988, 1990)
- US Open: 1R (1988, 1989, 1990)

Doubles
- Career record: 27–25
- Career titles: 1 ITF
- Highest ranking: No. 191 (6 June 1988)

Laura Lapi (born 10 September 1970) is a former professional tennis player from Italy.

== Biography ==
As a junior, Lapi was runner-up to Natalia Zvereva in the 1987 Orange Bowl and was also a girls' doubles finalist at the 1988 US Open.

Lapi was a member of the Italy Fed Cup team in the 1988 competition. She won her first match, over Poland's Magdalena Feistel, to help Italy win the tie. In the second round, the Italians were beaten by home side Australia and Lapi lost her match in three sets to Nicole Provis.

Her best performance on the WTA Tour was a semifinal appearance at Paris in 1988. She had a win over Jana Novotná at the 1988 German Open. In 1990, she received her best ranking of 66 in the world, after making the third round at Hilton Head, in a run which included beating Claudia Kohde-Kilsch.

Lapi made the third round of the 1990 French Open. At the Wimbledon Championships that followed, her first-round opponent was Hana Mandliková, who had announced she would retire at the end of the tournament. She lost to Mandliková 9–11 in the third set, having been unable to convert three match points.

== ITF finals ==
$25,000 tournaments
$10,000 tournaments

=== Singles (6–6) ===
Result	No.	Date	Tournament	Surface	Opponent	Score
Win	1.	6 April 1987	ITF Caserta, Italy	Clay	(Greece) Olga Tsarbopoulou	6–1, 6–3
Loss	2.	8 June 1987	ITF Carpi, Italy	Clay	(Italy) Cathy Caverzasio	1–6, 2–6
Win	3.	15 June 1987	ITF Salerno, Italy	Clay	(Sweden) Anna-Karin Olsson	6–3, 6–2
Win	4.	12 July 1987	ITF Paliano, Italy	Clay	(Indonesia) Suzanna Wibowo	4–6, 6–1, 6–4
Loss	5.	13 July 1987	ITF Subiaco, Italy	Clay	(Italy) Sabrina Lucchi	6–1, 1–6, 6–7
Win	6.	17 August 1987	ITF Lisbon, Portugal	Clay	(Austria) Petra Schwarz	6–4, 4–6, 7–5
Loss	7.	24 August 1987	ITF Porto, Portugal	Clay	(Austria) Mirijam Schweda	4–6, 0–6
Win	8.	20 July 1992	ITF Subiaco, Italy	Clay	(Czechoslovakia) Martina Hautová	6–0, 6–1
Win	9.	8 June 1992	ITF Nicolosi, Italy	Clay	(Czechoslovakia) Janette Husárová	6–0, 6–3
Loss	10.	24 August 1992	ITF La Spezia, Italy	Clay	(Romania) Andreea Ehritt-Vanc	4–6, 2–6
Loss	11.	21 September 1992	ITF Acireale, Italy	Clay	(Italy) Katia Piccolini	3–6, 2–6
Loss	12.	19 July 1993	ITF Sezze, Italy	Clay	(Italy) Katia Piccolini	3–6, 2–6

=== Doubles (1–2) ===
Result	No.	Date	Tournament	Surface	Partner	Opponents	Score
Loss	1.	12 July 1987	ITF Paliano, Italy	Clay	(Italy) Barbara Romanò	(Indonesia) Yayuk Basuki (Indonesia) Suzanna Wibowo	4–6, 6–2, 0–6
Win	2.	3 August 1992	ITF Nicolosi, Italy	Clay	(Italy) Rita Grande	(Italy) Emanuela Brusati (Italy) Germana Di Natale	6–4, 6–2
Loss	3.	24 August 1992	ITF La Spezia, Italy	Clay	(Italy) Marzia Grossi	(Czechoslovakia) Květa Peschke (Slovenia) Tina Vukasovič	5–7, 6–2, 2–6
