= Cathy Caverzasio =

Swiss-Italian tennis player (born 1972)

- Country (sports): Italy; Switzerland
- Born: 28 September 1972 (age 53) Geneva, Switzerland
- Prize money: $185,960

Singles
- Career record: 117–94
- Career titles: 2 ITF
- Highest ranking: No. 34 (30 April 1990)

Grand Slam singles results
- Australian Open: 2R (1991)
- French Open: 2R (1989, 1990, 1991)
- Wimbledon: 1R (1991)
- US Open: 2R (1989)

Doubles
- Career record: 33–44
- Career titles: 0
- Highest ranking: No. 45 (23 September 1991)

Grand Slam doubles results
- Australian Open: 3R (1991)
- French Open: 1R (1990, 1991, 1992)
- Wimbledon: 1R (1991)
- US Open: 2R (1989, 1991)

Team competitions
- Fed Cup: 3–2

Cathy Caverzasio (born 28 September 1972) is a Swiss born former professional tennis player who represented both Italy and her native country.

== Biography ==
Caverzasio won her first ITF title as a 14 year old in 1987 and was aged only 16 when she first appeared for the Italy Fed Cup team in 1988. On her Federation Cup debut, she partnered with Laura Garrone to win the decisive doubles rubber in a World Group tie against Poland. As a junior, Caverzasio was runner-up in the girls' doubles at two Grand Slam tournaments, 1988 US Open and 1989 French Open. Her best performance on the WTA Tour was a runner-up finish at the 1989 Mantegazza Cup in Taranto, and the following year she reached her career-best ranking of 34 in the world.

In 1991, she switched allegiances to her country of birth Switzerland. She was a member of the Swiss team which made it to the 1991 Federation Cup quarterfinals, where they were beaten by Czechoslovakia. For the doubles against Czechoslovakia, she partnered with Manuela Maleeva in what was a dead rubber, which the Swiss pair won after their opponents Jana Novotná and Regina Rajchrtová lost the first set, then abandoned the match in the second.

Her son, Kilian Feldbausch is also a tennis player.

== WTA career finals ==
=== Singles: 1 (runner-up) ===
| Result | Date | Tournament | Tier | Surface | Opponent | Score |
|---|---|---|---|---|---|---|
| Loss | May 1989 | Ilva Trophy, Italy | Category 1 | Clay | (France) Karine Quentrec | 3–6, 7–5, 3–6 |

=== Doubles: 1 (runner-up) ===
| Result | Date | Tournament | Tier | Surface | Partner | Opponents | Score |
|---|---|---|---|---|---|---|---|
| Loss | May 1991 | Swiss Open | Tier IV | Clay | (Switzerland) Manuela Maleeva-Fragnière | (Australia) Nicole Provis (Australia) Elizabeth Smylie | 1–6, 2–6 |

== ITF finals ==
=== Singles (2–0) ===
$25,000 tournaments
$10,000 tournaments

| Result | Date | Tournament | Surface | Opponent | Score |
|---|---|---|---|---|---|
| Win | 8 June 1987 | ITF Carpi, Italy | Clay | (Italy) Laura Lapi | 6–1, 6–2 |
| Win | 11 April 1988 | ITF Caserta, Italy | Clay | (Brazil) Andrea Vieira | 6–2, 3–6, 7–5 |
