= 1994 WTA Tour =

Women's tennis circuit

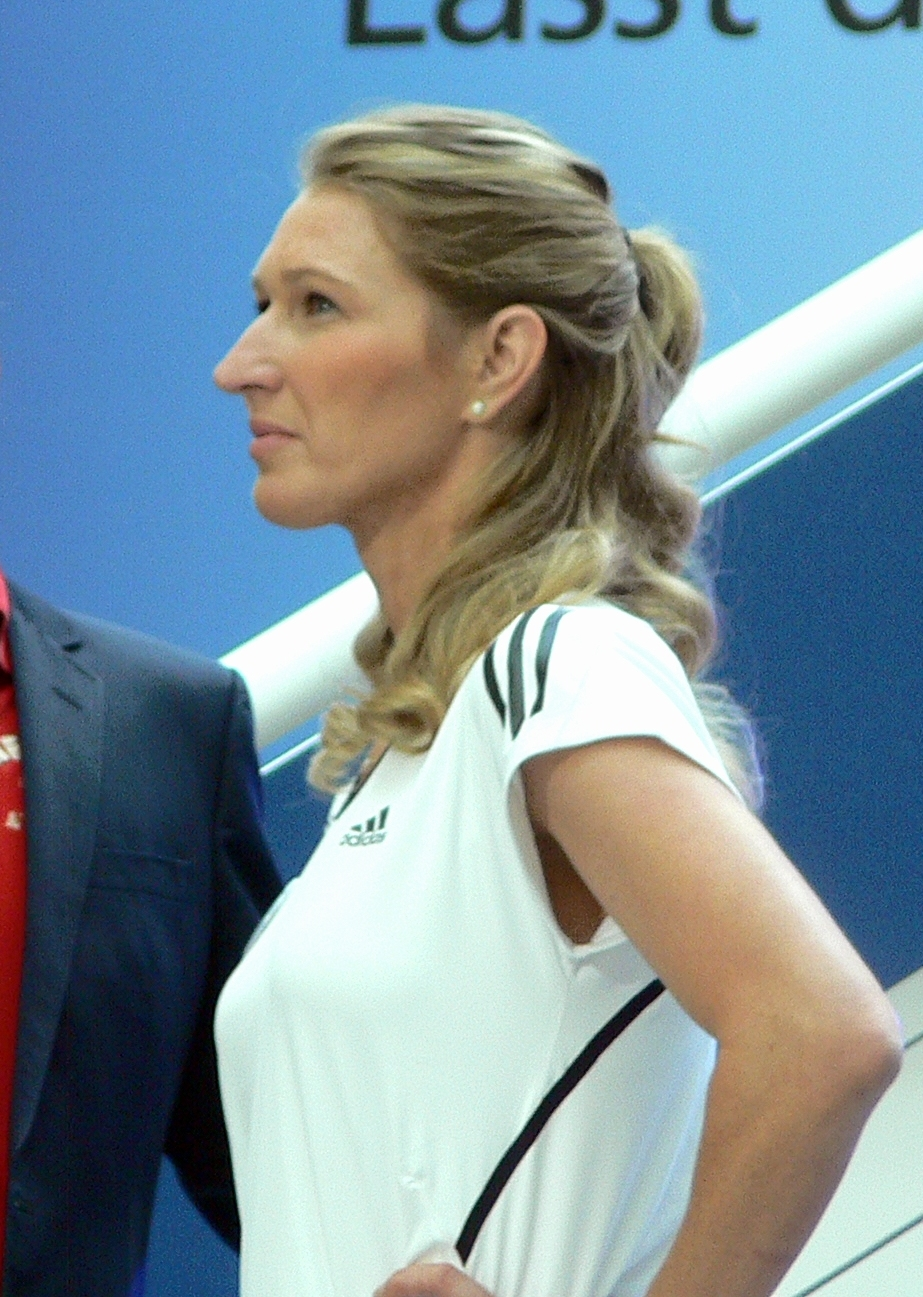
- Steffi Graf finished the year as world No. 1 for the sixth time in her career, though Arantxa Sánchez Vicario was named the Player of the Year. Graf won seven tournaments during the season, including a major at the Australian Open. She also won three Tier I events and finished runner-up at another major, the US Open. Sánchez Vicario won eight tournaments during the season, including two majors at the French Open and the US Open. She also won a Tier I event and finished runner-up at another major, the Australian Open.

Details
- Duration: 3 January – 14 November 1994
- Edition: 24th
- Tournaments: 55
- Categories: Grand Slam (4); WTA Championships; WTA Tier I (8); WTA Tier II (19); WTA Tier III (11); WTA Tier IV (12)

Achievements (singles)
- Most titles: (Spain) Arantxa Sánchez Vicario (8)
- Most finals: (Spain) Arantxa Sánchez Vicario (12)
- Prize money leader: (Spain) Arantxa Sánchez Vicario ($2,943,665)
- Points leader: (Germany) Steffi Graf (353.00)

Awards
- Player of the year: (Spain) Arantxa Sánchez Vicario
- Doubles team of the year: (United States) Gigi Fernández; (Belarus) Natasha Zvereva
- Most improved player of the year: (France) Mary Pierce
- Newcomer of the year: (Romania) Irina Spîrlea
- Comeback player of the year: (United States) Meredith McGrath

The 1994 WTA Tour was the elite tour for professional women's tennis organised by the Women's Tennis Association (WTA). The WTA Tour includes the four Grand Slam tournaments, the year-ending WTA Tour Championships and the WTA Tier I, Tier II, Tier III and Tier IV events. ITF tournaments are not part of the WTA Tour, although they award points for the WTA World Ranking.

== Schedule ==
The table below shows the 1994 WTA Tour schedule.

Key

Grand Slam events
Year-end championships
WTA Tier I tournaments
WTA Tier II events
WTA Tier III events
WTA Tier IV events
Team events

=== January ===
Week	Tournament	Champions	Runners-up	Semifinalists	Quarterfinalists
3 Jan	Hyundai Hopman Cup; Perth, Australia; ITF Mixed Teams Championships; Hard (i) – A$1,000,000 – 12 teams	Czech Republic; 2–1	Germany	Australia; Austria	Switzerland; France; Spain; United States
3 Jan	Danone Hardcourt Championships; Brisbane, Australia; Tier III event Hard – $150,000 – 56S/32Q/28D; Singles – Doubles	(United States) Lindsay Davenport; 6–1, 2–6, 6–3	(Argentina) Florencia Labat	(Bulgaria) Magdalena Maleeva (Chinese Taipei) Wang Shi-ting	(Australia) Rachel McQuillan (Australia) Michelle Jaggard-Lai (Ukraine) Natalia Medvedeva (Germany) Barbara Rittner
3 Jan	Danone Hardcourt Championships; Brisbane, Australia; Tier III event Hard – $150,000 – 56S/32Q/28D; Singles – Doubles	(Italy) Laura Golarsa (Ukraine) Natalia Medvedeva; 6–3, 6–1	(Australia) Jenny Byrne (Australia) Rachel McQuillan	(Bulgaria) Magdalena Maleeva (Chinese Taipei) Wang Shi-ting	(Australia) Rachel McQuillan (Australia) Michelle Jaggard-Lai (Ukraine) Natalia Medvedeva (Germany) Barbara Rittner
10 Jan	Tasmanian International; Hobart, Australia; Tier IV event Hard – $100,000 – 32S/32Q/16D; Singles – Doubles	(Japan) Mana Endo; 6–1, 6–7^{(1–7)}, 6–4	(Australia) Rachel McQuillan	(United States) Chanda Rubin (Netherlands) Kristie Boogert	(Italy) Silvia Farina (United States) Ginger Helgeson (Austria) Beate Reinstadler (Italy) Laura Golarsa
10 Jan	Tasmanian International; Hobart, Australia; Tier IV event Hard – $100,000 – 32S/32Q/16D; Singles – Doubles	(United States) Linda Harvey-Wild (United States) Chanda Rubin; 7–5, 4–6, 7–6^{(7–1)}	(Australia) Jenny Byrne (Australia) Rachel McQuillan	(United States) Chanda Rubin (Netherlands) Kristie Boogert	(Italy) Silvia Farina (United States) Ginger Helgeson (Austria) Beate Reinstadler (Italy) Laura Golarsa
10 Jan	NSW Open; Sydney, Australia; Tier II event Hard – $300,000 – 32S/32Q/16D; Singles – Doubles	(Japan) Kimiko Date; 6–4, 6–2	(United States) Mary Joe Fernández	(United States) Patty Fendick (Argentina) Gabriela Sabatini	(Spain) Conchita Martínez (Italy) Linda Ferrando (United States) Zina Garrison-Jackson (Germany) Barbara Rittner
10 Jan	NSW Open; Sydney, Australia; Tier II event Hard – $300,000 – 32S/32Q/16D; Singles – Doubles	(United States) Patty Fendick (United States) Meredith McGrath; 6–2, 6–3	(Czech Republic) Jana Novotná (Spain) Arantxa Sánchez Vicario	(United States) Patty Fendick (Argentina) Gabriela Sabatini	(Spain) Conchita Martínez (Italy) Linda Ferrando (United States) Zina Garrison-Jackson (Germany) Barbara Rittner
17 Jan; 24 Jan	Ford Australian Open; Melbourne, Australia; Grand Slam; Hard – $2,425,858 – 128S/64Q/64D/32X; Singles – Doubles – Mixed doubles	(Germany) Steffi Graf; 6–0, 6–2	(Spain) Arantxa Sánchez Vicario	(Japan) Kimiko Date (Argentina) Gabriela Sabatini	(United States) Lindsay Davenport (Spain) Conchita Martínez (Czech Republic) Jana Novotná (Switzerland) Manuela Maleeva-Fragnière
17 Jan; 24 Jan	Ford Australian Open; Melbourne, Australia; Grand Slam; Hard – $2,425,858 – 128S/64Q/64D/32X; Singles – Doubles – Mixed doubles	(United States) Gigi Fernández (Belarus) Natasha Zvereva; 6–3, 4–6, 6–4	(United States) Patty Fendick (United States) Meredith McGrath	(Japan) Kimiko Date (Argentina) Gabriela Sabatini	(United States) Lindsay Davenport (Spain) Conchita Martínez (Czech Republic) Jana Novotná (Switzerland) Manuela Maleeva-Fragnière
17 Jan; 24 Jan	Ford Australian Open; Melbourne, Australia; Grand Slam; Hard – $2,425,858 – 128S/64Q/64D/32X; Singles – Doubles – Mixed doubles	(Latvia) Larisa Neiland (Russia) Andrei Olhovskiy; 7–5, 6–7^{(0–7)}, 6–2	(Czech Republic) Helena Suková (Australia) Todd Woodbridge	(Japan) Kimiko Date (Argentina) Gabriela Sabatini	(United States) Lindsay Davenport (Spain) Conchita Martínez (Czech Republic) Jana Novotná (Switzerland) Manuela Maleeva-Fragnière
31 Jan	AMWAY Classic; Auckland, New Zealand; Tier IV event Hard – $100,000 – 32S/32Q/16D; Singles – Doubles	(United States) Ginger Helgeson; 7–6^{(7–4)}, 6–3	(Argentina) Inés Gorrochategui	(France) Julie Halard (Canada) Patricia Hy	(Israel) Anna Smashnova (South Africa) Tessa Price (Germany) Veronika Martinek (United States) Jolene Watanabe
31 Jan	AMWAY Classic; Auckland, New Zealand; Tier IV event Hard – $100,000 – 32S/32Q/16D; Singles – Doubles	(Canada) Patricia Hy (Argentina) Mercedes Paz; 6–4, 7–6^{(7–4)}	(Australia) Jenny Byrne (New Zealand) Julie Richardson	(France) Julie Halard (Canada) Patricia Hy	(Israel) Anna Smashnova (South Africa) Tessa Price (Germany) Veronika Martinek (United States) Jolene Watanabe
31 Jan	Tory Pan Pacific Open; Tokyo, Japan; Tier I event Hard – $750,000 – 32S/32Q/16D; Singles – Doubles	(Germany) Steffi Graf; 6–2, 6–4	(United States) Martina Navratilova	(Netherlands) Kristie Boogert (Switzerland) Manuela Maleeva-Fragnière	(Canada) Jana Nejedly (United States) Pam Shriver (Germany) Marketa Kochta (Latvia) Larisa Savchenko
31 Jan	Tory Pan Pacific Open; Tokyo, Japan; Tier I event Hard – $750,000 – 32S/32Q/16D; Singles – Doubles	(United States) Pam Shriver (Australia) Elizabeth Smylie; 6–3, 3–6, 7–6^{(7–3)}	(Netherlands) Manon Bollegraf (United States) Martina Navratilova	(Netherlands) Kristie Boogert (Switzerland) Manuela Maleeva-Fragnière	(Canada) Jana Nejedly (United States) Pam Shriver (Germany) Marketa Kochta (Latvia) Larisa Savchenko

=== February ===
Week	Tournament	Champions	Runners-up	Semifinalists	Quarterfinalists
7 Feb	Virginia Slims of Chicago; Chicago, United States; Tier II event Carpet (i) – $400,000 – 28S/32Q/16D; Singles – Doubles	(Belarus) Natasha Zvereva; 6–3, 7–5	(United States) Chanda Rubin	(Bulgaria) Magdalena Maleeva (United States) Lori McNeil	(United States) Martina Navratilova (United States) Sandra Cacic (United States) Zina Garrison-Jackson (United States) Lindsay Davenport
7 Feb	Virginia Slims of Chicago; Chicago, United States; Tier II event Carpet (i) – $400,000 – 28S/32Q/16D; Singles – Doubles	(United States) Gigi Fernández (Belarus) Natasha Zvereva; 6–3, 3–6, 6–4	(Netherlands) Manon Bollegraf (United States) Martina Navratilova	(Bulgaria) Magdalena Maleeva (United States) Lori McNeil	(United States) Martina Navratilova (United States) Sandra Cacic (United States) Zina Garrison-Jackson (United States) Lindsay Davenport
7 Feb	EA Generali Ladies; Linz, Austria; Tier III event Carpet (i) – $150,000 – 32S/32Q/16D; Singles – Doubles	(Belgium) Sabine Appelmans; 6–1, 4–6, 7–6^{(7–3)}	(Germany) Meike Babel	(Austria) Barbara Schett (Russia) Eugenia Maniokova	(Germany) Anke Huber (Russia) Elena Makarova (Georgia (country)) Leila Meskhi (Italy) Sandra Cecchini
7 Feb	EA Generali Ladies; Linz, Austria; Tier III event Carpet (i) – $150,000 – 32S/32Q/16D; Singles – Doubles	(Russia) Eugenia Maniokova (Georgia (country)) Leila Meskhi; 6–2, 6–2	(Sweden) Åsa Carlsson (Germany) Caroline Schneider	(Austria) Barbara Schett (Russia) Eugenia Maniokova	(Germany) Anke Huber (Russia) Elena Makarova (Georgia (country)) Leila Meskhi (Italy) Sandra Cecchini
7 Feb	Asia Women's Tennis Open; Osaka, Japan; Tier III event Carpet (i) – $150,000 – 32S/32Q/16D; Singles – Doubles	(Switzerland) Manuela Maleeva-Fragnière; 6–1, 4–6, 7–5	(Croatia) Iva Majoli	(Japan) Mana Endo (Japan) Ai Sugiyama	(Japan) Yone Kamio (Japan) Misumi Miyauchi (Netherlands) Kristie Boogert (South Korea) Sung-Hee Park
7 Feb	Asia Women's Tennis Open; Osaka, Japan; Tier III event Carpet (i) – $150,000 – 32S/32Q/16D; Singles – Doubles	(Latvia) Larisa Savchenko (Australia) Rennae Stubbs; 6–4, 6–7, 7–5	(United States) Pam Shriver (Australia) Elizabeth Smylie	(Japan) Mana Endo (Japan) Ai Sugiyama	(Japan) Yone Kamio (Japan) Misumi Miyauchi (Netherlands) Kristie Boogert (South Korea) Sung-Hee Park
14 Feb	China Open; Beijing, China; Tier IV event Hard (i) – $100,000 – 32S/32Q/16D; Singles – Doubles	(Indonesia) Yayuk Basuki; 6–4, 6–2	(Japan) Kyōko Nagatsuka	(Czech Republic) Andrea Strnadová (United States) Pam Shriver	(France) Alexia Dechaume-Balleret (Germany) Silke Meier (China) Li Fang (Japan) Misumi Miyauchi
14 Feb	China Open; Beijing, China; Tier IV event Hard (i) – $100,000 – 32S/32Q/16D; Singles – Doubles	(China) Chen Li-Ling (China) Fang Li; 6–0, 6–2	(Australia) Kerry-Anne Guse (United Kingdom) Valda Lake	(Czech Republic) Andrea Strnadová (United States) Pam Shriver	(France) Alexia Dechaume-Balleret (Germany) Silke Meier (China) Li Fang (Japan) Misumi Miyauchi
14 Feb	IGA Classic; Oklahoma City, United States; Tier III event Hard (i) – $150,000 – 32S/32Q/16D; Singles – Doubles	(United States) Meredith McGrath; 7–6^{(8–6)}, 7–6^{(7–4)}	(Netherlands) Brenda Schultz	(United States) Zina Garrison-Jackson (United States) Amy Frazier	(United States) Katrina Adams (United States) Sandra Cacic (United States) Patty Fendick (Canada) Helen Kelesi
14 Feb	IGA Classic; Oklahoma City, United States; Tier III event Hard (i) – $150,000 – 32S/32Q/16D; Singles – Doubles	(United States) Patty Fendick (United States) Meredith McGrath; 7–6^{(7–3)}, 6–2	(United States) Katrina Adams (Netherlands) Manon Bollegraf	(United States) Zina Garrison-Jackson (United States) Amy Frazier	(United States) Katrina Adams (United States) Sandra Cacic (United States) Patty Fendick (Canada) Helen Kelesi
14 Feb	Open GAZ de France; Paris, France; Tier II event Hard (i) – $400,000 – 32S/32Q/16D; Singles – Doubles	(United States) Martina Navratilova; 7–5, 6–3	(France) Julie Halard	(Georgia (country)) Leila Meskhi (Bulgaria) Katerina Maleeva	(Belgium) Sabine Appelmans (Netherlands) Caroline Vis (Belgium) Laurence Courtois (Germany) Wiltrud Probst
14 Feb	Open GAZ de France; Paris, France; Tier II event Hard (i) – $400,000 – 32S/32Q/16D; Singles – Doubles	(Belgium) Sabine Appelmans (Belgium) Laurence Courtois; 6–4, 6–4	(France) Mary Pierce (Hungary) Andrea Temesvári	(Georgia (country)) Leila Meskhi (Bulgaria) Katerina Maleeva	(Belgium) Sabine Appelmans (Netherlands) Caroline Vis (Belgium) Laurence Courtois (Germany) Wiltrud Probst
21 Feb	Evert Cup; Indian Wells, United States; Tier II event Hard – $400,000 – 32S/32Q/16D; Singles – Doubles	(Germany) Steffi Graf; 6–0, 6–4	(South Africa) Amanda Coetzer	(Croatia) Iva Majoli (United States) Lindsay Davenport	(United States) Ginger Helgeson (Belarus) Natasha Zvereva (Austria) Judith Wiesner (United States) Mary Joe Fernández
21 Feb	Evert Cup; Indian Wells, United States; Tier II event Hard – $400,000 – 32S/32Q/16D; Singles – Doubles	(United States) Lindsay Davenport (United States) Lisa Raymond; 6–2, 6–4	(Netherlands) Manon Bollegraf (Czech Republic) Helena Suková	(Croatia) Iva Majoli (United States) Lindsay Davenport	(United States) Ginger Helgeson (Belarus) Natasha Zvereva (Austria) Judith Wiesner (United States) Mary Joe Fernández
28 Feb	Virginia Slims of Florida; Delray Beach, United States; Tier II event Hard – $400,000 – 56S/32Q/28D; Singles – Doubles	(Germany) Steffi Graf; 6–3, 7–5	(Spain) Arantxa Sánchez Vicario	(Czech Republic) Helena Suková (United States) Chanda Rubin	(Germany) Sabine Hack (Argentina) Gabriela Sabatini (Ukraine) Natalia Medvedeva (Netherlands) Stephanie Rottier
28 Feb	Virginia Slims of Florida; Delray Beach, United States; Tier II event Hard – $400,000 – 56S/32Q/28D; Singles – Doubles	(Czech Republic) Jana Novotná (Spain) Arantxa Sánchez Vicario; 6–2, 6–0	(Netherlands) Manon Bollegraf (Czech Republic) Helena Suková	(Czech Republic) Helena Suková (United States) Chanda Rubin	(Germany) Sabine Hack (Argentina) Gabriela Sabatini (Ukraine) Natalia Medvedeva (Netherlands) Stephanie Rottier

=== March ===
Week	Tournament	Champions	Runners-up	Semifinalists	Quarterfinalists
7 Mar; 14 Mar	Lipton Championships; Key Biscayne, United States; Tier I event Hard – $1,000,000 – 96S/64Q/48D; Singles – Doubles	(Germany) Steffi Graf; 4–6, 6–1, 6–2	(Belarus) Natasha Zvereva	(United States) Lindsay Davenport (Netherlands) Brenda Schultz	(Japan) Kimiko Date (Argentina) Gabriela Sabatini (Czech Republic) Jana Novotná (Spain) Arantxa Sánchez Vicario
7 Mar; 14 Mar	Lipton Championships; Key Biscayne, United States; Tier I event Hard – $1,000,000 – 96S/64Q/48D; Singles – Doubles	(United States) Gigi Fernández (Belarus) Natasha Zvereva; 6–3, 6–1	(United States) Patty Fendick (United States) Meredith McGrath	(United States) Lindsay Davenport (Netherlands) Brenda Schultz	(Japan) Kimiko Date (Argentina) Gabriela Sabatini (Czech Republic) Jana Novotná (Spain) Arantxa Sánchez Vicario
21 Mar	Virginia Slims of Houston; Houston, United States; Tier II event Clay – $400,000 – 28S/32Q/16D; Singles – Doubles	(Germany) Sabine Hack; 7–5, 6–4	(France) Mary Pierce	(Spain) Conchita Martínez (Sweden) Åsa Carlsson	(Spain) Ángeles Montolio (Germany) Veronika Martinek (United States) Sandra Cacic (Argentina) Bettina Fulco-Villella
21 Mar	Virginia Slims of Houston; Houston, United States; Tier II event Clay – $400,000 – 28S/32Q/16D; Singles – Doubles	(Netherlands) Manon Bollegraf (United States) Martina Navratilova; 6–4, 6–2	(United States) Katrina Adams (United States) Zina Garrison-Jackson	(Spain) Conchita Martínez (Sweden) Åsa Carlsson	(Spain) Ángeles Montolio (Germany) Veronika Martinek (United States) Sandra Cacic (Argentina) Bettina Fulco-Villella
24 Mar	Light n' Lively Doubles Championships; Wesley Chapel, United States; Clay – $175,000 – 8D	(Czech Republic) Jana Novotná (Spain) Arantxa Sánchez Vicario; 6–2, 7–5	(United States) Gigi Fernández (Belarus) Natasha Zvereva	(United States) Austin / (United States) Shriver (United States) Fendick / (United States) McGrath	(Canada) Hetherington / (United States) Stafford (United States) Fernández / (United States) Stunkel (Latvia) Neiland / (Australia) Smylie (United States) McNeil / (Australia) Stubbs
28 Mar	Family Circle Cup; Hilton Head Island, United States; Tier I event Clay – $750,000 – 56S/32Q/28D; Singles – Doubles	(Spain) Conchita Martínez; 6–4, 6–0	(Belarus) Natasha Zvereva	(France) Mary Pierce (Croatia) Iva Majoli	(Spain) Arantxa Sánchez Vicario (Italy) Sandra Cecchini (United States) Lindsay Davenport (United States) Ginger Helgeson
28 Mar	Family Circle Cup; Hilton Head Island, United States; Tier I event Clay – $750,000 – 56S/32Q/28D; Singles – Doubles	(United States) Lori McNeil (Spain) Arantxa Sánchez Vicario; 6–4, 4–1, Retired	(United States) Gigi Fernández (Belarus) Natasha Zvereva	(France) Mary Pierce (Croatia) Iva Majoli	(Spain) Arantxa Sánchez Vicario (Italy) Sandra Cecchini (United States) Lindsay Davenport (United States) Ginger Helgeson

=== April ===
Week	Tournament	Champions	Runners-up	Semifinalists	Quarterfinalists
4 Apr	Bausch & Lomb Championships; Amelia Island, United States; Tier II event Clay – $400,000 – 56S/32Q/28D; Singles – Doubles	(Spain) Arantxa Sánchez Vicario; 6–1, 6–4	(Argentina) Gabriela Sabatini	(United States) Martina Navratilova (United States) Lindsay Davenport	(Germany) Sabine Hack (United States) Chanda Rubin (France) Mary Pierce (Spain) Conchita Martínez
4 Apr	Bausch & Lomb Championships; Amelia Island, United States; Tier II event Clay – $400,000 – 56S/32Q/28D; Singles – Doubles	(Latvia) Larisa Savchenko (Spain) Arantxa Sánchez Vicario; 6–2, 6–7^{(6–8)}, 6–4	(South Africa) Amanda Coetzer (Argentina) Inés Gorrochategui	(United States) Martina Navratilova (United States) Lindsay Davenport	(Germany) Sabine Hack (United States) Chanda Rubin (France) Mary Pierce (Spain) Conchita Martínez
4 Apr	Japan Open; Tokyo, Japan; Tier III event Hard – $150,000 – 32S/32Q/16D; Singles – Doubles	(Japan) Kimiko Date; 7–5, 6–0	(United States) Amy Frazier	(Japan) Naoko Sawamatsu (Belgium) Sabine Appelmans	(Austria) Barbara Schett (Argentina) Florencia Labat (United States) Patty Fendick (United States) Marianne Werdel
4 Apr	Japan Open; Tokyo, Japan; Tier III event Hard – $150,000 – 32S/32Q/16D; Singles – Doubles	(Japan) Mami Donoshiro (Japan) Ai Sugiyama; 6–4, 6–1	(Indonesia) Yayuk Basuki (Japan) Nana Miyagi	(Japan) Naoko Sawamatsu (Belgium) Sabine Appelmans	(Austria) Barbara Schett (Argentina) Florencia Labat (United States) Patty Fendick (United States) Marianne Werdel
11 Apr	Volvo Women's Open; Pattaya City, Thailand; Tier IV event Hard – $100,000 – 32S/32Q/16D; Singles – Doubles	(Belgium) Sabine Appelmans; 6–7^{(5–7)}, 7–6^{(7–5)}, 6–2	(United States) Patty Fendick	(Argentina) Florencia Labat (Australia) Kristine Radford	(Netherlands) Petra Kamstra (United States) Meredith McGrath (United States) Nicole Arendt (Austria) Barbara Paulus
11 Apr	Volvo Women's Open; Pattaya City, Thailand; Tier IV event Hard – $100,000 – 32S/32Q/16D; Singles – Doubles	(United States) Patty Fendick (United States) Meredith McGrath; 7–6^{(7–0)}, 3–6, 6–3	(Indonesia) Yayuk Basuki (Japan) Nana Miyagi	(Argentina) Florencia Labat (Australia) Kristine Radford	(Netherlands) Petra Kamstra (United States) Meredith McGrath (United States) Nicole Arendt (Austria) Barbara Paulus
18 Apr	International Championships of Spain; Barcelona, Spain; Tier II event Clay – $400,000 – 32S/32Q/16D; Singles – Doubles	(Spain) Arantxa Sánchez Vicario; 6–0, 6–2	(Croatia) Iva Majoli	(Germany) Sabine Hack (Bulgaria) Magdalena Maleeva	(France) Julie Halard (Argentina) Patricia Tarabini (United States) Ann Grossman (Spain) Conchita Martínez
18 Apr	International Championships of Spain; Barcelona, Spain; Tier II event Clay – $400,000 – 32S/32Q/16D; Singles – Doubles	(Latvia) Larisa Savchenko (Spain) Arantxa Sánchez Vicario; 6–2, 6–4	(France) Julie Halard (France) Nathalie Tauziat	(Germany) Sabine Hack (Bulgaria) Magdalena Maleeva	(France) Julie Halard (Argentina) Patricia Tarabini (United States) Ann Grossman (Spain) Conchita Martínez
18 Apr	Singapore Classic; Singapore; Tier IV event Hard – $100,000 – 32S/32Q/16D; Singles – Doubles	(Japan) Naoko Sawamatsu; 7–5, 7–5	(Argentina) Florencia Labat	(United States) Nicole Arendt (China) Fang Li	(United States) Linda Harvey-Wild (South Africa) Tessa Price (United States) Julie Steven (Japan) Yone Kamio
18 Apr	Singapore Classic; Singapore; Tier IV event Hard – $100,000 – 32S/32Q/16D; Singles – Doubles	(United States) Patty Fendick (United States) Meredith McGrath; 6–4, 6–1	(United States) Nicole Arendt (Australia) Kristine Radford	(United States) Nicole Arendt (China) Fang Li	(United States) Linda Harvey-Wild (South Africa) Tessa Price (United States) Julie Steven (Japan) Yone Kamio
25 Apr	Danamon Indonesia Women's Open; Jakarta, Indonesia; Tier IV event Hard – $100,000 – 32S/32Q/16D; Singles – Doubles	(Indonesia) Yayuk Basuki; 6–4, 3–6, 7–6^{(7–1)}	(Argentina) Florencia Labat	(Chinese Taipei) Wang Shi-ting (Australia) Kristine Radford	(Japan) Nana Miyagi (United States) Nicole Arendt (Australia) Rachel McQuillan (South Africa) / (South Africa) Dianne Van Rensburg
25 Apr	Danamon Indonesia Women's Open; Jakarta, Indonesia; Tier IV event Hard – $100,000 – 32S/32Q/16D; Singles – Doubles	(United States) Nicole Arendt (Australia) Kristine Radford; 6–2, 6–2	(Australia) Kerry-Anne Guse (Czech Republic) Andrea Strnadová	(Chinese Taipei) Wang Shi-ting (Australia) Kristine Radford	(Japan) Nana Miyagi (United States) Nicole Arendt (Australia) Rachel McQuillan (South Africa) / (South Africa) Dianne Van Rensburg
25 Apr	Citizen Cup; Hamburg, Germany; Tier II event Clay – $400,000 – 32S/32Q/16D; Singles – Doubles	(Spain) Arantxa Sánchez Vicario; 4–6, 7–6^{(7–3)}, 7–6^{(8–6)}	(Germany) Steffi Graf	(Czech Republic) Jana Novotná (Germany) Sabine Hack	(Bulgaria) Magdalena Maleeva (Germany) Barbara Rittner (Germany) Anke Huber (Georgia (country)) Leila Meskhi
25 Apr	Citizen Cup; Hamburg, Germany; Tier II event Clay – $400,000 – 32S/32Q/16D; Singles – Doubles	(Czech Republic) Jana Novotná (Spain) Arantxa Sánchez Vicario; 6–3, 6–2	(Russia) Eugenia Maniokova (Georgia (country)) Leila Meskhi	(Czech Republic) Jana Novotná (Germany) Sabine Hack	(Bulgaria) Magdalena Maleeva (Germany) Barbara Rittner (Germany) Anke Huber (Georgia (country)) Leila Meskhi
25 Apr	Ilva Trophy; Taranto, Italy; Tier IV event Clay – $100,000 – 32S/32Q/16D; Singles – Doubles	(France) Julie Halard; 6–2, 6–3	(Romania) Irina Spîrlea	(Austria) Sandra Dopfer (Netherlands) Brenda Schultz	(France) Alexandra Fusai (Belgium) Laurence Courtois (Italy) Sandra Cecchini (Slovakia) Karina Habšudová
25 Apr	Ilva Trophy; Taranto, Italy; Tier IV event Clay – $100,000 – 32S/32Q/16D; Singles – Doubles	(Romania) Irina Spîrlea (France) Noëlle van Lottum; 6–3, 2–6, 6–1	(Italy) Sandra Cecchini (France) Isabelle Demongeot	(Austria) Sandra Dopfer (Netherlands) Brenda Schultz	(France) Alexandra Fusai (Belgium) Laurence Courtois (Italy) Sandra Cecchini (Slovakia) Karina Habšudová

=== May ===
Week	Tournament	Champions	Runners-up	Semifinalists	Quarterfinalists
2 May	Italian Open; Rome, Italy; Tier I event Clay – $750,000 – 56S/32Q/28D; Singles – Doubles	(Spain) Conchita Martínez; 7–6^{(7–5)}, 6–4	(United States) Martina Navratilova	(Slovakia) Karina Habšudová (Romania) Irina Spîrlea	(France) Nathalie Tauziat (Italy) Adriana Serra Zanetti (Austria) Judith Wiesner (Japan) Naoko Sawamatsu
2 May	Italian Open; Rome, Italy; Tier I event Clay – $750,000 – 56S/32Q/28D; Singles – Doubles	(United States) Gigi Fernández (Belarus) Natasha Zvereva; 6–1, 6–3	(Argentina) Gabriela Sabatini (Netherlands) Brenda Schultz	(Slovakia) Karina Habšudová (Romania) Irina Spîrlea	(France) Nathalie Tauziat (Italy) Adriana Serra Zanetti (Austria) Judith Wiesner (Japan) Naoko Sawamatsu
9 May	German Open; Berlin, Germany; Tier I event Clay – $750,000 – 56S/32Q/28D; Singles – Doubles	(Germany) Steffi Graf; 7–6^{(8–6)}, 6–4	(Netherlands) Brenda Schultz	(Czech Republic) Jana Novotná (Germany) Anke Huber	(France) Julie Halard (Argentina) Inés Gorrochategui (United States) Ann Grossman (Russia) Elena Makarova
9 May	German Open; Berlin, Germany; Tier I event Clay – $750,000 – 56S/32Q/28D; Singles – Doubles	(United States) Gigi Fernández (Belarus) Natasha Zvereva; 6–3, 7–6^{(7–2)}	(Czech Republic) Jana Novotná (Spain) Arantxa Sánchez Vicario	(Czech Republic) Jana Novotná (Germany) Anke Huber	(France) Julie Halard (Argentina) Inés Gorrochategui (United States) Ann Grossman (Russia) Elena Makarova
9 May	BVV Prague Open; Prague, Czech Republic; Tier IV event Clay – $100,000 – 32S/32Q/16D; Singles – Doubles	(South Africa) Amanda Coetzer; 6–1, 7–6^{(16–14)}	(Sweden) Åsa Carlsson	(Argentina) Paola Suárez (Germany) Silke Frankl	(Austria) Barbara Schett (Czech Republic) Ludmila Richterová (Romania) Ruxandra Dragomir (France) Alexandra Fusai
9 May	BVV Prague Open; Prague, Czech Republic; Tier IV event Clay – $100,000 – 32S/32Q/16D; Singles – Doubles	(South Africa) Amanda Coetzer (United States) Linda Harvey-Wild; 6–4, 3–6, 6–2	(Netherlands) Kristie Boogert (Italy) Laura Golarsa	(Argentina) Paola Suárez (Germany) Silke Frankl	(Austria) Barbara Schett (Czech Republic) Ludmila Richterová (Romania) Ruxandra Dragomir (France) Alexandra Fusai
16 May	European Open; Lucerne, Switzerland; Tier III event Clay – $150,000 – 28S/32Q/16D	(United States) Lindsay Davenport; 7–6^{(7–3)}, 6–4	(United States) Lisa Raymond	(United States) Chanda Rubin (United States) Amy Frazier	(United States) Meredith McGrath (Czech Republic) Helena Suková (Austria) Beate Reinstadler (Bulgaria) Magdalena Maleeva
16 May	European Open; Lucerne, Switzerland; Tier III event Clay – $150,000 – 28S/32Q/16D	Doubles canceled due to rain		(United States) Chanda Rubin (United States) Amy Frazier	(United States) Meredith McGrath (Czech Republic) Helena Suková (Austria) Beate Reinstadler (Bulgaria) Magdalena Maleeva
16 May	Internationaux de Strasbourg; Strasbourg, France; Tier III event Clay – $150,000 – 28S/32Q/16D; Singles – Doubles	(United States) Mary Joe Fernández; 2–6, 6–4, 6–0	(Argentina) Gabriela Sabatini	(Austria) Judith Wiesner (Japan) Kimiko Date	(Croatia) Iva Majoli (Belgium) Sabine Appelmans (United States) Lori McNeil (Japan) Naoko Sawamatsu
16 May	Internationaux de Strasbourg; Strasbourg, France; Tier III event Clay – $150,000 – 28S/32Q/16D; Singles – Doubles	(United States) Lori McNeil (Australia) Rennae Stubbs; 6–3, 3–6, 6–2	(Argentina) Patricia Tarabini (Netherlands) Caroline Vis	(Austria) Judith Wiesner (Japan) Kimiko Date	(Croatia) Iva Majoli (Belgium) Sabine Appelmans (United States) Lori McNeil (Japan) Naoko Sawamatsu
23 May; 30 May	French Open; Paris, France; Grand Slam; Clay – $3,535,650 – 128S/64Q/64D/48X; Singles – Doubles – Mixed doubles	(Spain) Arantxa Sánchez Vicario; 6–4, 6–4	(France) Mary Pierce	(Germany) Steffi Graf (Spain) Conchita Martínez	(Argentina) Inés Gorrochategui (Austria) Petra Ritter (Germany) Sabine Hack (France) Julie Halard
23 May; 30 May	French Open; Paris, France; Grand Slam; Clay – $3,535,650 – 128S/64Q/64D/48X; Singles – Doubles – Mixed doubles	(United States) Gigi Fernández (Belarus) Natasha Zvereva; 6–2, 6–2	(United States) Lindsay Davenport (United States) Lisa Raymond	(Germany) Steffi Graf (Spain) Conchita Martínez	(Argentina) Inés Gorrochategui (Austria) Petra Ritter (Germany) Sabine Hack (France) Julie Halard
23 May; 30 May	French Open; Paris, France; Grand Slam; Clay – $3,535,650 – 128S/64Q/64D/48X; Singles – Doubles – Mixed doubles	(Netherlands) Kristie Boogert (Netherlands) Menno Oosting; 7–5, 3–6, 7–5	(Latvia) Larisa Neiland (Russia) Andrei Olhovskiy	(Germany) Steffi Graf (Spain) Conchita Martínez	(Argentina) Inés Gorrochategui (Austria) Petra Ritter (Germany) Sabine Hack (France) Julie Halard

=== June ===
Week	Tournament	Champions	Runners-up	Semifinalists	Quarterfinalists
6 Jun	DFS Classic; Birmingham, Great Britain; Tier III event Grass – $150,000 – 56S/32Q/28D; Singles – Doubles	(United States) Lori McNeil; 6–2, 6–2	(United States) Zina Garrison-Jackson	(France) Nathalie Tauziat (Netherlands) Brenda Schultz	(Italy) Laura Golarsa (United States) Pam Shriver (Croatia) Iva Majoli (South Africa) Joannette Kruger
6 Jun	DFS Classic; Birmingham, Great Britain; Tier III event Grass – $150,000 – 56S/32Q/28D; Singles – Doubles	(United States) Zina Garrison-Jackson (Latvia) Larisa Neiland; 6–4, 6–4	(Australia) Catherine Barclay (Australia) Kerry-Anne Guse	(France) Nathalie Tauziat (Netherlands) Brenda Schultz	(Italy) Laura Golarsa (United States) Pam Shriver (Croatia) Iva Majoli (South Africa) Joannette Kruger
13 Jun	Volkswagen Championships; Eastbourne, Great Britain; Tier II event Grass – $400,000 – 56S/28D; Singles – Doubles	(United States) Meredith McGrath; 6–2, 6–4	(United States) Linda Harvey-Wild	(Indonesia) Yayuk Basuki (Belarus) Natasha Zvereva	(United States) Martina Navratilova (Italy) Silvia Farina (Australia) Kristine Radford (United States) Lisa Raymond
13 Jun	Volkswagen Championships; Eastbourne, Great Britain; Tier II event Grass – $400,000 – 56S/28D; Singles – Doubles	(United States) Gigi Fernández (Belarus) Natasha Zvereva; 6–7^{(4–7)}, 6–4, 6–3	(Argentina) Inés Gorrochategui (Czech Republic) Helena Suková	(Indonesia) Yayuk Basuki (Belarus) Natasha Zvereva	(United States) Martina Navratilova (Italy) Silvia Farina (Australia) Kristine Radford (United States) Lisa Raymond
20 Jun; 27 Jun	Wimbledon Championships; London, Great Britain; Grand Slam; Grass – $2,705,332 – 128S/64Q/64D/64X; Singles – Doubles – Mixed doubles	(Spain) Conchita Martínez; 6–4, 3–6, 6–3	(United States) Martina Navratilova	(United States) Lori McNeil (United States) Gigi Fernández	(Latvia) Larisa Savchenko (United States) Lindsay Davenport (Czech Republic) Jana Novotná (United States) Zina Garrison-Jackson
20 Jun; 27 Jun	Wimbledon Championships; London, Great Britain; Grand Slam; Grass – $2,705,332 – 128S/64Q/64D/64X; Singles – Doubles – Mixed doubles	(United States) Gigi Fernández (Belarus) Natasha Zvereva; 6–4, 6–1	(Czech Republic) Jana Novotná (Spain) Arantxa Sánchez Vicario	(United States) Lori McNeil (United States) Gigi Fernández	(Latvia) Larisa Savchenko (United States) Lindsay Davenport (Czech Republic) Jana Novotná (United States) Zina Garrison-Jackson
20 Jun; 27 Jun	Wimbledon Championships; London, Great Britain; Grand Slam; Grass – $2,705,332 – 128S/64Q/64D/64X; Singles – Doubles – Mixed doubles	(Czech Republic) Helena Suková (Australia) Todd Woodbridge; 3–6, 7–5, 6–3	(United States) Lori McNeil (United States) T. J. Middleton	(United States) Lori McNeil (United States) Gigi Fernández	(Latvia) Larisa Savchenko (United States) Lindsay Davenport (Czech Republic) Jana Novotná (United States) Zina Garrison-Jackson

=== July ===
Week	Tournament	Champions	Runners-up	Semifinalists	Quarterfinalists
4 Jul	Torneo Internazional Femmin di Palermo; Palermo, Italy; Tier IV event Clay – $100,000 – 32S/32Q/16D; Singles – Doubles	(Romania) Irina Spîrlea; 6–4, 1–6, 7–6^{(7–5)}	(Netherlands) Brenda Schultz	(Italy) Sandra Cecchini (Austria) Sandra Dopfer	(China) Fang Li (Spain) Neus Ávila Bonastre (Austria) Petra Ritter (Slovakia) Katarína Studeníková
4 Jul	Torneo Internazional Femmin di Palermo; Palermo, Italy; Tier IV event Clay – $100,000 – 32S/32Q/16D; Singles – Doubles	(Romania) Ruxandra Dragomir (Italy) Laura Garrone; 6–1, 6–0	(Italy) Alice Canepa (Italy) Giulia Casoni	(Italy) Sandra Cecchini (Austria) Sandra Dopfer	(China) Fang Li (Spain) Neus Ávila Bonastre (Austria) Petra Ritter (Slovakia) Katarína Studeníková
18 July	Federation Cup; Frankfurt, Germany; Team event Clay	Spain; 3–0	United States	Germany; France	Japan; South Africa; Bulgaria; Austria
25 Jul	Styrian Open; Styria, Austria; Tier IV event Clay – $100,000 – 32S/32Q/16D; Singles – Doubles	(Germany) Anke Huber; 6–3, 6–3	(Austria) Judith Wiesner	(Italy) Sandra Cecchini (Italy) Silvia Farina	(Spain) María Sánchez Lorenzo (Austria) Petra Ritter (Germany) Barbara Rittner (Slovakia) Karina Habšudová
25 Jul	Styrian Open; Styria, Austria; Tier IV event Clay – $100,000 – 32S/32Q/16D; Singles – Doubles	(Italy) Sandra Cecchini (Argentina) Patricia Tarabini; 7–5, 7–5	(France) Alexandra Fusai (Slovakia) Karina Habšudová	(Italy) Sandra Cecchini (Italy) Silvia Farina	(Spain) María Sánchez Lorenzo (Austria) Petra Ritter (Germany) Barbara Rittner (Slovakia) Karina Habšudová
25 Jul	Acura U.S. Women's Hardcourts; Stratton Mountain, United States; Tier II event Hard – $400,000 – 32S/32Q/16D; Singles – Doubles	(Spain) Conchita Martínez; 4–6, 6–3, 6–4	(Spain) Arantxa Sánchez Vicario	(Croatia) Iva Majoli (South Africa) Amanda Coetzer	(United States) Tami Whitlinger Jones (United States) Mary Joe Fernández (United States) Ginger Helgeson (United States) Marianne Werdel
25 Jul	Acura U.S. Women's Hardcourts; Stratton Mountain, United States; Tier II event Hard – $400,000 – 32S/32Q/16D; Singles – Doubles	(United States) Pam Shriver (Australia) Elizabeth Smylie; 7–6^{(7–4)}, 2–6, 7–5	(Spain) Conchita Martínez (Spain) Arantxa Sánchez Vicario	(Croatia) Iva Majoli (South Africa) Amanda Coetzer	(United States) Tami Whitlinger Jones (United States) Mary Joe Fernández (United States) Ginger Helgeson (United States) Marianne Werdel

=== August ===
Week	Tournament	Champions	Runners-up	Semifinalists	Quarterfinalists
1 Aug	Toshiba Classic; San Diego, United States; Tier II event Hard – $400,000 – 56S/28D; Singles – Doubles	(Germany) Steffi Graf; 6–2, 6–1	(Spain) Arantxa Sánchez Vicario	(United States) Tami Whitlinger Jones (Spain) Conchita Martínez	(France) Julie Halard (United States) Lindsay Davenport (Czech Republic) Jana Novotná (Germany) Christina Singer
1 Aug	Toshiba Classic; San Diego, United States; Tier II event Hard – $400,000 – 56S/28D; Singles – Doubles	(Czech Republic) Jana Novotná (Spain) Arantxa Sánchez Vicario; 6–3, 6–3	(United States) Ginger Helgeson-Nielsen (Australia) Rachel McQuillan	(United States) Tami Whitlinger Jones (Spain) Conchita Martínez	(France) Julie Halard (United States) Lindsay Davenport (Czech Republic) Jana Novotná (Germany) Christina Singer
8 Aug	Virginia Slims of Los Angeles; Manhattan Beach, United States; Tier II event Hard – $400,000 – 56S/32Q/28D; Singles – Doubles	(United States) Amy Frazier; 6–1, 6–3	(United States) Ann Grossman	(Belgium) Sabine Appelmans (France) Julie Halard	(Spain) Conchita Martínez (Czech Republic) Jana Novotná (Canada) Patricia Hy (United States) Zina Garrison-Jackson
8 Aug	Virginia Slims of Los Angeles; Manhattan Beach, United States; Tier II event Hard – $400,000 – 56S/32Q/28D; Singles – Doubles	(France) Julie Halard (France) Nathalie Tauziat; 6–1, 0–6, 6–1	(Czech Republic) Jana Novotná (United States) Lisa Raymond	(Belgium) Sabine Appelmans (France) Julie Halard	(Spain) Conchita Martínez (Czech Republic) Jana Novotná (Canada) Patricia Hy (United States) Zina Garrison-Jackson
15 Aug	Matinee LTD Canadian Open; Montreal, Canada; Tier I event Hard – $750,000 – 56S/32Q/28D; Singles – Doubles	(Spain) Arantxa Sánchez Vicario; 7–5, 1–6, 7–6^{(7–4)}	(Germany) Steffi Graf	(France) Mary Pierce (Japan) Kimiko Date	(Argentina) Gabriela Sabatini (Austria) Judith Wiesner (Italy) Natalia Baudone (Bulgaria) Katerina Maleeva
15 Aug	Matinee LTD Canadian Open; Montreal, Canada; Tier I event Hard – $750,000 – 56S/32Q/28D; Singles – Doubles	(United States) Meredith McGrath (Spain) Arantxa Sánchez Vicario; 2–6, 6–2, 6–4	(United States) Pam Shriver (Australia) Elizabeth Smylie	(France) Mary Pierce (Japan) Kimiko Date	(Argentina) Gabriela Sabatini (Austria) Judith Wiesner (Italy) Natalia Baudone (Bulgaria) Katerina Maleeva
22 Aug	OTB International Open; Schenectady, United States; Tier III event Hard – $150,000 – 32S/32Q/16D; Singles – Doubles	(Austria) Judith Wiesner; 7–5, 3–6, 6–4	(Latvia) Larisa Neiland	(South Africa) Amanda Coetzer (France) Nathalie Tauziat	(Chinese Taipei) Wang Shi-ting (Ukraine) Natalia Medvedeva (Netherlands) Stephanie Rottier (Germany) Barbara Rittner
22 Aug	OTB International Open; Schenectady, United States; Tier III event Hard – $150,000 – 32S/32Q/16D; Singles – Doubles	(United States) Meredith McGrath (Latvia) Larisa Neiland; 6–2, 6–2	(United States) Pam Shriver (Australia) Elizabeth Smylie	(South Africa) Amanda Coetzer (France) Nathalie Tauziat	(Chinese Taipei) Wang Shi-ting (Ukraine) Natalia Medvedeva (Netherlands) Stephanie Rottier (Germany) Barbara Rittner
29 Aug; 5 Sep	US Open; New York City, United States; Grand Slam; Hard – $3,900,000 – 128S/64Q/64D/32X; Singles – Doubles – Mixed doubles	(Spain) Arantxa Sánchez Vicario; 1–6, 7–6^{(7–3)}, 6–4	(Germany) Steffi Graf	(Czech Republic) Jana Novotná (Argentina) Gabriela Sabatini	(South Africa) Amanda Coetzer (France) Mary Pierce (United States) Gigi Fernández (Japan) Kimiko Date
29 Aug; 5 Sep	US Open; New York City, United States; Grand Slam; Hard – $3,900,000 – 128S/64Q/64D/32X; Singles – Doubles – Mixed doubles	(Czech Republic) Jana Novotná (Spain) Arantxa Sánchez Vicario; 6–3, 6–3	(Bulgaria) Katerina Maleeva (United States) Robin White	(Czech Republic) Jana Novotná (Argentina) Gabriela Sabatini	(South Africa) Amanda Coetzer (France) Mary Pierce (United States) Gigi Fernández (Japan) Kimiko Date
29 Aug; 5 Sep	US Open; New York City, United States; Grand Slam; Hard – $3,900,000 – 128S/64Q/64D/32X; Singles – Doubles – Mixed doubles	(South Africa) Elna Reinach (United States) Patrick Galbraith; 6–2, 6–4	(Czech Republic) Jana Novotná (Australia) Todd Woodbridge	(Czech Republic) Jana Novotná (Argentina) Gabriela Sabatini	(South Africa) Amanda Coetzer (France) Mary Pierce (United States) Gigi Fernández (Japan) Kimiko Date

=== September ===
Week	Tournament	Champions	Runners-up	Semifinalists	Quarterfinalists
19 Sep	Moscow Ladies Open; Moscow, Russia; Tier III event Carpet (i) – $150,000 – 32S/32Q/16D; Singles – Doubles	(Bulgaria) Magdalena Maleeva; 7–5, 6–1	(Italy) Sandra Cecchini	(Russia) Elena Makarova (Belgium) Sabine Appelmans	(Kazakhstan) Elena Likhovtseva (Czech Republic) Helena Suková (Belgium) Els Callens (Italy) Silvia Farina
19 Sep	Moscow Ladies Open; Moscow, Russia; Tier III event Carpet (i) – $150,000 – 32S/32Q/16D; Singles – Doubles	(Russia) Elena Makarova (Russia) Eugenia Maniokova; 7–6^{(7–3)}, 6–4	(Italy) Laura Golarsa (Netherlands) Caroline Vis	(Russia) Elena Makarova (Belgium) Sabine Appelmans	(Kazakhstan) Elena Likhovtseva (Czech Republic) Helena Suková (Belgium) Els Callens (Italy) Silvia Farina
19 Sep	Nichirei International Championships; Tokyo, Japan; Tier II event Hard – $400,000 – 32S/32Q/16D; Singles – Doubles	(Spain) Arantxa Sánchez Vicario; 6–1, 6–2	(United States) Amy Frazier	(Japan) Nana Miyagi (Argentina) Gabriela Sabatini	(United States) Marianne Werdel (Germany) Sabine Hack (Japan) Ai Sugiyama (Japan) Mana Endo
19 Sep	Nichirei International Championships; Tokyo, Japan; Tier II event Hard – $400,000 – 32S/32Q/16D; Singles – Doubles	(France) Julie Halard (Spain) Arantxa Sánchez Vicario; 6–1, 0–6, 6–1	(United States) Amy Frazier (Japan) Rika Hiraki	(Japan) Nana Miyagi (Argentina) Gabriela Sabatini	(United States) Marianne Werdel (Germany) Sabine Hack (Japan) Ai Sugiyama (Japan) Mana Endo
26 Sep	International Damen Grand Prix; Leipzig, Germany; Tier II event Carpet (i) – $400,000 – 32S/32Q/16D; Singles – Doubles	(Czech Republic) Jana Novotná; 7–5, 6–1	(France) Mary Pierce	(Austria) Judith Wiesner (Germany) Anke Huber	(Netherlands) Brenda Schultz (Croatia) Iva Majoli (Germany) Barbara Rittner (Italy) Sandra Cecchini
26 Sep	International Damen Grand Prix; Leipzig, Germany; Tier II event Carpet (i) – $400,000 – 32S/32Q/16D; Singles – Doubles	(United States) Patty Fendick (United States) Meredith McGrath; 6–4, 6–4	(Netherlands) Manon Bollegraf (Latvia) Larisa Neiland	(Austria) Judith Wiesner (Germany) Anke Huber	(Netherlands) Brenda Schultz (Croatia) Iva Majoli (Germany) Barbara Rittner (Italy) Sandra Cecchini

=== October ===
Week	Tournament	Champions	Runners-up	Semifinalists	Quarterfinalists
3 Oct	European Indoors; Zürich, Switzerland; Tier I event Carpet (i) – $750,000 – 32S/32Q/16D; Singles – Doubles	(Bulgaria) Magdalena Maleeva; 7–5, 3–6, 6–4	(Belarus) Natasha Zvereva	(Czech Republic) Helena Suková (Netherlands) Miriam Oremans	(United States) Martina Navratilova (United States) Shaun Stafford (United States) Lori McNeil (France) Mary Pierce
3 Oct	European Indoors; Zürich, Switzerland; Tier I event Carpet (i) – $750,000 – 32S/32Q/16D; Singles – Doubles	(Netherlands) Manon Bollegraf (United States) Martina Navratilova; 7–6^{(7–3)}, 6–1	(United States) Patty Fendick (United States) Meredith McGrath	(Czech Republic) Helena Suková (Netherlands) Miriam Oremans	(United States) Martina Navratilova (United States) Shaun Stafford (United States) Lori McNeil (France) Mary Pierce
10 Oct	Porsche Tennis Grand Prix; Filderstadt, Germany; Tier II event Hard (i) – $400,000 – 32S/32Q/16D; Singles – Doubles	(Germany) Anke Huber; 6–4, 6–2	(France) Mary Pierce	(Slovakia) Karina Habšudová (United States) Marianne Werdel	(Spain) Conchita Martínez (United States) Gigi Fernández (Switzerland) Martina Hingis (United States) Martina Navratilova
10 Oct	Porsche Tennis Grand Prix; Filderstadt, Germany; Tier II event Hard (i) – $400,000 – 32S/32Q/16D; Singles – Doubles	(United States) Gigi Fernández (Belarus) Natasha Zvereva; 7–6^{(7–5)}, 6–4	(Netherlands) Manon Bollegraf (Latvia) Larisa Neiland	(Slovakia) Karina Habšudová (United States) Marianne Werdel	(Spain) Conchita Martínez (United States) Gigi Fernández (Switzerland) Martina Hingis (United States) Martina Navratilova
17 Oct	Brighton International; Brighton, Great Britain; Tier II event Hard (i) – $400,000 – 32S/32Q/16D; Singles – Doubles	(Czech Republic) Jana Novotná; 6–7^{(4–7)}, 6–3, 6–4	(Czech Republic) Helena Suková	(Latvia) Larisa Neiland (France) Julie Halard	(Spain) Conchita Martínez (France) Nathalie Tauziat (Germany) Meike Babel (Bulgaria) Katerina Maleeva
17 Oct	Brighton International; Brighton, Great Britain; Tier II event Hard (i) – $400,000 – 32S/32Q/16D; Singles – Doubles	(Netherlands) Manon Bollegraf (Latvia) Larisa Neiland; 4–6, 6–2, 6–3	(United States) Mary Joe Fernández (Czech Republic) Jana Novotná	(Latvia) Larisa Neiland (France) Julie Halard	(Spain) Conchita Martínez (France) Nathalie Tauziat (Germany) Meike Babel (Bulgaria) Katerina Maleeva
24 Oct	Nokia Grand Prix; Essen, Germany; Tier II event Hard (i) – $400,000 – 32S/32Q/16D; Singles – Doubles	(Czech Republic) Jana Novotná; 6–2, 6–4	(Croatia) Iva Majoli	(Ukraine) Natalia Medvedeva (Slovakia) Karina Habšudová	(Netherlands) Brenda Schultz (Germany) Anke Huber (Switzerland) Martina Hingis (Belgium) Sabine Appelmans
24 Oct	Nokia Grand Prix; Essen, Germany; Tier II event Hard (i) – $400,000 – 32S/32Q/16D; Singles – Doubles	(Sweden) Maria Lindström (Sweden) Maria Strandlund; 6–2, 6–1	(Russia) Eugenia Maniokova (Georgia (country)) Leila Meskhi	(Ukraine) Natalia Medvedeva (Slovakia) Karina Habšudová	(Netherlands) Brenda Schultz (Germany) Anke Huber (Switzerland) Martina Hingis (Belgium) Sabine Appelmans
31 Oct	Bell Challenge; Quebec City, Canada; Tier III event Carpet (i) – $150,000 – 32S/32Q/16D; Singles – Doubles	(Bulgaria) Katerina Maleeva; 6–3, 6–3	(Netherlands) Brenda Schultz	(United States) Chanda Rubin (France) Nathalie Tauziat	(South Africa) Amanda Coetzer (Canada) Patricia Hy (South Africa) Elna Reinach (United States) Linda Harvey-Wild
31 Oct	Bell Challenge; Quebec City, Canada; Tier III event Carpet (i) – $150,000 – 32S/32Q/16D; Singles – Doubles	(South Africa) Elna Reinach (France) Nathalie Tauziat; 6–4, 6–3	(United States) Linda Harvey-Wild (United States) Chanda Rubin	(United States) Chanda Rubin (France) Nathalie Tauziat	(South Africa) Amanda Coetzer (Canada) Patricia Hy (South Africa) Elna Reinach (United States) Linda Harvey-Wild
31 Oct	Bank of the West Classic; Oakland, United States; Tier II event Carpet (i) – $400,000 – 28S/16D; Singles – Doubles	(Spain) Arantxa Sánchez Vicario; 1–6, 7–6^{(7–5)}, 7–6^{(7–3)}	(United States) Martina Navratilova	(United States) Lindsay Davenport (United States) Debbie Graham	(United States) Zina Garrison-Jackson (Germany) Anke Huber (United States) Jolene Watanabe (United States) Amy Frazier
31 Oct	Bank of the West Classic; Oakland, United States; Tier II event Carpet (i) – $400,000 – 28S/16D; Singles – Doubles	(United States) Lindsay Davenport (Spain) Arantxa Sánchez Vicario; 7–5, 6–4	(United States) Gigi Fernández (United States) Martina Navratilova	(United States) Lindsay Davenport (United States) Debbie Graham	(United States) Zina Garrison-Jackson (Germany) Anke Huber (United States) Jolene Watanabe (United States) Amy Frazier

=== November ===
Week	Tournament	Champions	Runners-up	Semifinalists	Quarterfinalists
7 Nov	Virginia Slims of Philadelphia; Philadelphia, United States; Tier I event Carpet (i) – $750,000 – 32S/32Q/16D; Singles – Doubles	(Germany) Anke Huber; 6–0, 6–7^{(4–7)}, 7–5	(France) Mary Pierce	(Argentina) Gabriela Sabatini (Belarus) Natasha Zvereva	(United States) Kimberly Po (United States) Chanda Rubin (Netherlands) Brenda Schultz (United States) Meilen Tu
7 Nov	Virginia Slims of Philadelphia; Philadelphia, United States; Tier I event Carpet (i) – $750,000 – 32S/32Q/16D; Singles – Doubles	(United States) Gigi Fernández (Belarus) Natasha Zvereva; 4–6, 6–4, 6–2	(Argentina) Gabriela Sabatini (Netherlands) Brenda Schultz	(Argentina) Gabriela Sabatini (Belarus) Natasha Zvereva	(United States) Kimberly Po (United States) Chanda Rubin (Netherlands) Brenda Schultz (United States) Meilen Tu
7 Nov	Surabaya Women's Open; Surabaya, Indonesia; Tier IV event Hard – $100,000 – 32S/10Q/16D; Singles – Doubles	(Bulgaria) Elena Wagner; 2–6, 6–0, retired	(Japan) Ai Sugiyama	(Australia) Michelle Jaggard-Lai (South Korea) Sung-Hee Park	(Czech Republic) Radka Bobková (Slovakia) Katarína Studeníková (Slovakia) Janette Husárová (Germany) Petra Begerow
7 Nov	Surabaya Women's Open; Surabaya, Indonesia; Tier IV event Hard – $100,000 – 32S/10Q/16D; Singles – Doubles	(Indonesia) Yayuk Basuki (Indonesia) Romana Tedjakusuma; Walkover	(Japan) Kyōko Nagatsuka (Japan) Ai Sugiyama	(Australia) Michelle Jaggard-Lai (South Korea) Sung-Hee Park	(Czech Republic) Radka Bobková (Slovakia) Katarína Studeníková (Slovakia) Janette Husárová (Germany) Petra Begerow
14 Nov	Virginia Slims Championships; New York City, United States; Year-end championships Carpet (i) – $3,708,500 – 16S/8D; Singles – Doubles	(Argentina) Gabriela Sabatini; 6–3, 6–2, 6–4	(United States) Lindsay Davenport	(France) Mary Pierce (Japan) Kimiko Date	(Germany) Steffi Graf (Czech Republic) Jana Novotná (Spain) Conchita Martínez (France) Julie Halard
14 Nov	Virginia Slims Championships; New York City, United States; Year-end championships Carpet (i) – $3,708,500 – 16S/8D; Singles – Doubles	(United States) Gigi Fernández (Belarus) Natasha Zvereva; 6–3, 6–7^{(4–7)}, 6–3	(Czech Republic) Jana Novotná (Spain) Sánchez Vicario	(France) Mary Pierce (Japan) Kimiko Date	(Germany) Steffi Graf (Czech Republic) Jana Novotná (Spain) Conchita Martínez (France) Julie Halard
14 Nov	P&G Taiwan Women's Open; Taipei, Taiwan; Tier IV event Hard – $100,000 – 32S/8Q/16D; Singles – Doubles	(Chinese Taipei) Wang Shi-ting; 6–1, 6–3	(Japan) Kyōko Nagatsuka	(Italy) Rita Grande (Japan) Yone Kamio	(United States) Jolene Watanabe (Czech Republic) Radka Bobková (Belgium) Dominique Monami (Japan) Nana Miyagi
14 Nov	P&G Taiwan Women's Open; Taipei, Taiwan; Tier IV event Hard – $100,000 – 32S/8Q/16D; Singles – Doubles	(Australia) Michelle Jaggard-Lai (Canada) Rene Simpson-Alter; 6–0, 7–6^{(12–10)}	(Belgium) Nancy Feber (France) Alexandra Fusai	(Italy) Rita Grande (Japan) Yone Kamio	(United States) Jolene Watanabe (Czech Republic) Radka Bobková (Belgium) Dominique Monami (Japan) Nana Miyagi

== Rankings ==
Below are the 1994 WTA year-end rankings in both singles and doubles competition:

Singles Year-end Ranking
No	Player Name	Points	1993	Change
1	Steffi Graf (GER)	353.2966	1	=
2	Arantxa Sánchez Vicario (ESP)	311.7073	2	=
3	Conchita Martínez (ESP)	180.2141	4	+1
4	Jana Novotná (CZE)	164.0995	6	+2
5	Mary Pierce (FRA)	155.7375	12	+7
6	Lindsay Davenport (USA)	141.9000	20	+14
7	Gabriela Sabatini (ARG)	138.4333	5	-2
8	Martina Navratilova (USA)	134.6079	3	-5
9	Kimiko Date (JPN)	124.7929	13	+4
10	Natalia Zvereva (BLR)	123.9882	19	+9
11	Magdalena Maleeva (BUL)	94.8929	11	+5
12	Anke Huber (GER)	94.4017	10	-2
13	Iva Majoli (CRO)	84.5278	46	+33
14	Mary Joe Fernández (USA)	81.4417	7	-7
15	Brenda Schultz (NED)	76.9500	40	+25
16	Amy Frazier (USA)	72.6250	25	+9
17	Lori McNeil (USA)	71.0625	39	+22
18	Amanda Coetzer (RSA)	68.9283	15	-3
19	Sabine Hack (GER)	67.9722	24	+5
20	Inés Gorrochategui (ARG)	67.7167	57	+37

Doubles Year-end Ranking
No	Player Name	Points	1993	Change
1	Natasha Zvereva (BLR)	494.6247	3	+2
2	Gigi Fernández (USA)	465.0201	1	-1
3	Arantxa Sánchez Vicario (ESP)	431.3038	6	+3
4	Jana Novotná (CZE)	364.3657	4	=
5	Martina Navratilova (USA)	277.7750	11	+6
6	Meredith McGrath (FRA)	262.4556	23	+17
7	Patty Fendick (USA)	229.3761	14	+7
8	Lindsay Davenport (USA)	210.8846	49	+41
9	Manon Bollegraf (NED)	209.9600	18	+9
10	Lisa Raymond (USA)	206.4583	32	+22
11	Larisa Neiland (LAT)	205.0437	5	-6
12	Pam Shriver (USA)	193.9146	7	-5
13	Elizabeth Smylie (AUS)	179.5423	9	-4
14	Gabriela Sabatini (ARG)	160.4091	NR	NR
15	Lori McNeil (USA)	160.2713	12	-3
16	Inés Gorrochategui (ARG)	159.3750	19	+3
17	Rennae Stubbs (AUS)	137.9267	8	+9
18	Eugenia Maniokova (RUS)	131.6765	39	+21
19	Robin White (USA)	130.9500	62	+43
20	Julie Halard (FRA)	127.8500	70	+50

== Statistical information ==
List of players and titles won, last name alphabetically:

- Arantxa Sánchez Vicario – Amelia Island, Barcelona, Hamburg, French Open, Montreal, US Open, Tokyo (Tier II), Oakland (8)
- Steffi Graf – Australian Open, Tokyo (Tier I), Indian Wells, Delray Beach, Miami, Berlin, San Diego (7)
- Conchita Martínez – Hilton Head, Rome, Wimbledon, Stratton Mountain (4)
- Anke Huber – Styria, Filderstadt, Philadelphia (3)
- Jana Novotná – Leipzig, Brighton, Essen (3)
- Sabine Appelmans – Linz, Pattaya City (2)
- Yayuk Basuki – Osaka, Jakarta (2)
- Kimiko Date – Sydney, Tokyo (Tier III) (2)
- Lindsay Davenport – Brisbane, Lucerne (2)
- Magdalena Maleeva – Moscow, Zurich (2)
- Meredith McGrath – Oklahoma City, Eastbourne (2)
- Amanda Coetzer – Prague (1)
- Mana Endo – Hobart (1)
- Mary Joe Fernández – Strasbourg (1)
- Amy Frazier – Manhattan Beach (1)
- Sabine Hack – Houston (1)
- Julie Halard – Taranto (1)
- Ginger Helgeson – Auckland (1)
- Katerina Maleeva – Quebec City (1)
- Manuela Maleeva-Fragnière – Osaka (1)
- Lori McNeil – Birmingham (1)
- Martina Navratilova – Paris (1)
- Elena Pampoulova – Surabaya (1)
- Gabriela Sabatini – WTA Tour Championships (1)
- Naoko Sawamatsu – Singapore (1)
- Irina Spîrlea – Palermo (1)
- Wang Shi-ting – Taipei (1)
- Judith Wiesner – Schenectady (1)
- Natalia Zvereva – Chicago (1)

The following players won their first title:

- (Japan) Mana Endo
- (United States) Ginger Helgeson
- (United States) Meredith McGrath
- (Romania) Irina Spîrlea
- (Bulgaria) Elena Pampoulova

== See also ==
- 1994 ATP Tour
