= 1995 Amway Classic – Doubles =

Doubles
- 1995 Amway Classic
- 1994 Champions: (Canada) Patricia Hy (Argentina) Mercedes Paz

Final
- Champions: (Canada) Jill Hetherington (South Africa) Elna Reinach
- Runners-up: (Italy) Laura Golarsa (Netherlands) Caroline Vis
- Score: 7–6, 6–2

Details
- Draw: 16
- Seeds: 4

Events
Singles	Doubles
← 1994 ·	WTA Auckland Open	· 1996 →

Patricia Hy-Boulais and Mercedes Paz were the defending champions but only Hy competed that year with Ann Grossman.

Grossman and Hy-Boulais lost in the first round to Laura Golarsa and Caroline Vis.

Jill Hetherington and Elna Reinach won in the final 7–6, 6–2 against Golarsa and Vis.

== Seeds ==
Champion seeds are indicated in bold text while text in italics indicates the round in which those seeds were eliminated.

1. (Italy) Laura Golarsa / (Netherlands) Caroline Vis (final)
2. (Canada) **Jill Hetherington** / (South Africa) **Elna Reinach (champions)**
3. (United States) Ginger Helgeson-Nielsen / (Australia) Rachel McQuillan (quarterfinals)
4. (France) Alexia Dechaume-Balleret / (France) Julie Halard (quarterfinals)

== Draw ==
=== Key ===
- Q = Qualifier
- WC = Wild card
- LL = Lucky loser
- Alt = Alternate
- SE = Special exempt
- PR = Protected ranking
- ITF = ITF entry
- JE = Junior exempt
- w/o = Walkover
- r = Retired
- d = Defaulted
- SR = Special ranking

First round
1	(Italy) **L Golarsa** (Netherlands) **C Vis**	**6**	**6**
(United States) A Grossman (Canada) P Hy-Boulais	1	1
(France) **A Fusai** (China) **F Li**	**6**	**6**
(Hungary) V Csurgo (Argentina) B Fulco-Villella	3	4
3	(United States) **G Helgeson-Nielsen** (Australia) **R McQuillan**	**6**	**6**
(Germany) K Kschwendt (France) S Testud	3	0
LL	(Thailand) B Sangaram (Thailand) T Tanasugarn	1	1
(Australia) **K Godridge** (Australia) **K Sharpe**	**6**	**6**
(South Africa) M de Swardt (South Africa) L Horn	5	1
(Belgium) **E Callens** (Belgium) **N Feber**	**7**	**6**
Q	(Netherlands) K de Weille (Czech Republic) L Richterová	2	4
4	(France) **A Dechaume-Balleret** (France) **J Halard**	**6**	**6**
(Italy) **S Farina** (Argentina) **P Tarabini**	**6**	6	**6**
(Australia) N Pratt (Australia) T Morton-Rodgers	4	**7**	3
WC	(Australia) E Clark (New Zealand) A Trail	2	3
2	(Canada) **J Hetherington** (South Africa) **E Reinach**	**6**	**6**

Quarterfinals
1	(Italy) **L Golarsa** (Netherlands) **C Vis**	**1**
(France) A Fusai (China) F Li	3	r
3	(United States) G Helgeson-Nielsen (Australia) R McQuillan	4	4
(Australia) **K Godridge** (Australia) **K Sharpe**	**6**	**6**
(Belgium) **E Callens** (Belgium) **N Feber**	**6**	**7**
4	(France) A Dechaume-Balleret (France) J Halard	4	5
(Italy) S Farina (Argentina) P Tarabini	3	4
2	(Canada) **J Hetherington** (South Africa) **E Reinach**	**6**	**6**

Semifinals
1	(Italy) **L Golarsa** (Netherlands) **C Vis**	**6**	**7**
(Australia) K Godridge (Australia) K Sharpe	3	6
(Belgium) E Callens (Belgium) N Feber	4	1
2	(Canada) **J Hetherington** (South Africa) **E Reinach**	**6**	**6**

Final
1	(Italy) Laura Golarsa (Netherlands) Caroline Vis	6	2
2	(Canada) **Jill Hetherington** (South Africa) **Elna Reinach**	**7**	**6**
