= 1993 Amway Classic – Doubles =

Doubles
- 1993 Amway Classic

Final
- Champions: (France) Isabelle Demongeot; (South Africa) Elna Reinach
- Runners-up: (Canada) Jill Hetherington; (United States) Kathy Rinaldi
- Score: 6–2, 6–4

Details
- Draw: 16 (1 Q / 1 WC )
- Seeds: 4

Events
Singles	Doubles
← 1992 ·	WTA Auckland Open	· 1994 →

Rosalyn Fairbank-Nideffer and Raffaella Reggi-Concato were the defending champions, but none competed this year. Reggi-Concato retired from professional tennis at the end of the 1992 season.

Isabelle Demongeot and Elna Reinach won the title by defeating Jill Hetherington and Kathy Rinaldi 6–2, 6–4 in the final.

== Seeds ==
1. (Canada) Jill Hetherington / (United States) Kathy Rinaldi (final)
2. (France) Isabelle Demongeot / (South Africa) Elna Reinach (champions)
3. (Australia) Jo-Anne Faull / (United States) Ginger Helgeson (semifinals)
4. (New Zealand) Julie Richardson / (United Kingdom) Clare Wood (semifinals)

== Draw ==
=== Key ===
- Q = Qualifier
- WC = Wild card
- LL = Lucky loser
- Alt = Alternate
- SE = Special exempt
- PR = Protected ranking
- ITF = ITF entry
- JE = Junior exempt
- w/o = Walkover
- r = Retired
- d = Defaulted
- SR = Special ranking

=== Draw ===
First round

Quarterfinals

Semifinals

Final

1
(Canada) J Hetherington
(United States) K Rinaldi
6
6

- (Argentina) B Fulco-Villella
- (Argentina) P Tarabini
2
1

1
(Canada) J Hetherington
(United States) K Rinaldi
6
6

- (United States) L Glitz
- (United States) P O'Reilly
1
7^{8}
3

- (Australia) K Godridge
- (France) N Herreman
3
3

(Australia) K Godridge
(France) N Herreman
6
6^{6}
6

1
(Canada) J Hetherington
(United States) K Rinaldi
7
6

3
(Australia) JA Faull
(United States) G Helgeson
7
6

3
- (Australia) JA Faull
- (United States) G Helgeson
5
3

Q
- (France) S Sabas
- (Belgium) S Wasserman
5
3

3
(Australia) JA Faull
(United States) G Helgeson
4
6
6

(United States) N Arendt
(Germany) K Kschwendt
3
6
6

- (United States) N Arendt
- (Germany) K Kschwendt
6
3
4

- (France) A Fusai
- (Germany) S Hack
6
3
4

1
- (Canada) J Hetherington
- (United States) K Rinaldi
2
4

- (Croatia) N Ercegović
- (United States) D Faber
0
1

2
(France) I Demongeot
(South Africa) E Reinach
6
6

(Poland) M Mróz
(Poland) K Teodorowicz
6
6

- (Poland) M Mróz
- (Poland) K Teodorowicz
4
4

- (Australia) N Pratt
- (France) N van Lottum
3
6^{2}

4
(New Zealand) J Richardson
(United Kingdom) C Wood
6
6

4
(New Zealand) J Richardson
(United Kingdom) C Wood
6
7^{7}

4
- (New Zealand) J Richardson
- (United Kingdom) C Wood
1
4

(United States) J Fuchs
(Sweden) M Strandlund
6
6

2
(France) I Demongeot
(South Africa) E Reinach
6
6

- (United States) C Kuhlman
- (Mexico) L Novelo
1
2

- (United States) J Fuchs
- (Sweden) M Strandlund
2
4

WC
- (Israel) Y Segal
- (New Zealand) C Toleafoa
2
2

2
(France) I Demongeot
(South Africa) E Reinach
6
6

2
(France) I Demongeot
(South Africa) E Reinach
6
6
