= 1993 Amway Classic =

- Date: 1–7 February
- Edition: 8th
- Category: Tier IV
- Draw: 32S / 16D
- Prize money: $100,000
- Surface: Hard / outdoor
- Location: Auckland, New Zealand
- Venue: ASB Tennis Centre

Champions

Singles
- (South Africa) Elna Reinach

Doubles
- (France) Isabelle Demongeot / (South Africa) Elna Reinach
← 1992 ·	WTA Auckland Open	· 1994 →

The 1993 Amway Classic was a women's tennis tournament played on outdoor hard courts at the ASB Tennis Centre in Auckland in New Zealand that was part of Tier IV of the 1993 WTA Tour. It was the eighth edition of the tournament and was held from 1 February through 7 February 1993. Unseeded Elna Reinach won the singles title and earned $18,000 first prize money.

== Finals ==
=== Singles ===
(South Africa) Elna Reinach defeated (United States) Caroline Kuhlman 6–0, 6–0

- It was Reinach's only WTA title of her career.

=== Doubles ===
(France) Isabelle Demongeot / (South Africa) Elna Reinach defeated (Canada) Jill Hetherington / (United States) Kathy Rinaldi 6–2, 6–4

== Prize money ==
Event	W	F	SF	QF	Round of 16	Round of 32
Singles	$18,000	$8,500	$4,300	$2,175	$1,125	$700
Doubles *	$6,000	$3,500	$2,000	$1,000	$500	–

* per team

== See also ==
- 1993 Benson and Hedges Open – men's tournament
