= 1994 Amway Classic =

- Date: 31 January – 6 February
- Edition: 9th
- Category: Tier IV
- Draw: 32S / 16D
- Prize money: $100,000
- Surface: Hard /outdoor
- Location: Auckland, New Zealand
- Venue: ASB Tennis Centre

Champions

Singles
- (United States) Ginger Helgeson

Doubles
- (Canada) Patricia Hy / (Argentina) Mercedes Paz
← 1993 ·	WTA Auckland Open	· 1995 →

The 1994 Amway Classic was a tennis tournament played on outdoor hard courts at the ASB Tennis Centre in Auckland, New Zealand, that was part of Tier IV of the 1994 WTA Tour. It was the ninth edition of the tournament and was held from 31 January through 6 February, 1994. Third-seeded Ginger Helgeson won the singles title and earned $18,000 first-prize money.

== Finals ==
=== Singles ===
(United States) Ginger Helgeson defeated (Argentina) Inés Gorrochategui 7–6, 6–3

- It was Helgeson's only title of the year and the 1st of her career.

=== Doubles ===
(Canada) Patricia Hy / (Argentina) Mercedes Paz defeated (Australia) Jenny Byrne / (New Zealand) Julie Richardson 6–4, 7–6

- It was Hy's only title of the year and the 2nd of her career. It was Paz's only title of the year and the 24th of her career.

== See also ==
- 1994 Benson and Hedges Open – men's tournament
