= 1995 Amway Classic – Singles =

Singles
- 1995 Amway Classic
- 1994 Champion: (United States) Ginger Helgeson

Final
- Champion: (Australia) Nicole Bradtke
- Runner-up: (United States) Ginger Helgeson-Nielsen
- Score: 3–6, 6–2, 6–1

Details
- Draw: 32
- Seeds: 8

Events
Singles	Doubles
← 1994 ·	WTA Auckland Open	· 1996 →

Ginger Helgeson-Nielsen was the defending champion but lost in the final 3–6, 6–2, 6–1 against Nicole Bradtke.

== Seeds ==
A champion seed is indicated in bold text while text in italics indicates the round in which that seed was eliminated.

1. (France) Julie Halard (quarterfinals)
2. (United States) Ginger Helgeson-Nielsen (final)
3. (United States) Ann Grossman (first round)
4. (United States) Linda Harvey-Wild (second round)
5. (China) Fang Li (quarterfinals)
6. (Italy) Silvia Farina (semifinals)
7. (Ukraine) Natalia Medvedeva (semifinals)
8. (Canada) Patricia Hy-Boulais (first round)

== Draw ==
=== Key ===
- Q = Qualifier
- WC = Wild card
- LL = Lucky loser
- Alt = Alternate
- SE = Special exempt
- PR = Protected ranking
- ITF = ITF entry
- JE = Junior exempt
- w/o = Walkover
- r = Retired
- d = Defaulted
- SR = Special ranking

First round
1	(France) **J Halard**	**6**	**6**
Q	(Australia) K Godridge	2	2
(France) **A D-Balleret**	**6**	**6**
WC	(Australia) A Ellwood	2	0
(France) S Pitkowski	3	0
(Germany) **K Kschwendt**	**6**	**6**
WC	(Australia) **N Bradtke**	5	**6**	**6**
8	(Canada) P Hy-Boulais	**7**	1	4
4	(United States) **L Harvey-Wild**	**6**	**7**
Q	(Italy) R Grande	2	5
(Argentina) B Fulco-Villella	**6**	2	1
(Netherlands) **K de Weille**	3	**6**	**6**
(Italy) L Golarsa	4	4
Q	(Hungary) **V Csurgo**	**6**	**6**
(Switzerland) E Zardo	3	3
6	(Italy) **S Farina**	**6**	**6**
7	(Ukraine) **N Medvedeva**	4	**7**	**6**
(France) S Testud	**6**	5	1
(France) A Fusai	**6**	3	1
(Czech Republic) **L Richterová**	3	**6**	**6**
(France) N van Lottum	0	**6**	r
(Australia) **R McQuillan**	**6**	2
(South Africa) **M de Swardt**	**7**	**7**
3	(United States) A Grossman	5	6
WC/5	(China) **F Li**	4	**6**	**6**
(Belgium) N Feber	**6**	3	2
Q	(Italy) F Lubiani	3	2
(Belgium) **E Callens**	**6**	**6**
(South Africa) **E Reinach**	**6**	**7**
(Germany) S Meier	3	6
(Netherlands) C Vis	3	3
2	(United States) **G H-Nielsen**	**6**	**6**

Second round
1	(France) **J Halard**	**7**	**6**
(France) A D-Balleret	5	2
(Germany) K Kschwendt	0	2
WC	(Australia) **N Bradtke**	**6**	**6**
4	(United States) L Harvey-Wild	3	4
(Netherlands) **K de Weille**	**6**	**6**
Q	(Hungary) V Csurgo	1	**7**	2
6	(Italy) **S Farina**	**6**	6	**6**
7	(Ukraine) **N Medvedeva**	3	**6**	**6**
(Czech Republic) L Richterová	**6**	1	4
(Australia) **R McQuillan**	**7**	**6**
(South Africa) M de Swardt	6	2
WC/5	(China) **F Li**	**6**	**6**
(Belgium) E Callens	2	4
(South Africa) E Reinach	4	3
2	(United States) **G H-Nielsen**	**6**	**6**

Quarterfinals
1	(France) J Halard	6	3
WC	(Australia) **N Bradtke**	**7**	**6**
(Netherlands) K de Weille	2	**6**	3
6	(Italy) **S Farina**	**6**	3	**6**
7	(Ukraine) **N Medvedeva**	**6**	**6**
(Australia) R McQuillan	4	1
WC/5	(China) F Li
2	(United States) **G H-Nielsen**	**w/o**

Semifinals
WC	(Australia) **N Bradtke**	**7**	2	**6**
6	(Italy) S Farina	5	**6**	2
7	(Ukraine) N Medvedeva	4	4
2	(United States) **G H-Nielsen**	**6**	**6**

Final
WC	(Australia) **Nicole Bradtke**	3	**6**	**6**
2	(United States) G H-Nielsen	**6**	2	1
