= 1993 Amway Classic – Singles =

Singles
- 1993 Amway Classic

Final
- Champion: (South Africa) Elna Reinach
- Runner-up: (United States) Caroline Kuhlman
- Score: 6–0, 6–0

Details
- Draw: 32 (3 Q / 2 WC )
- Seeds: 8

Events
Singles	Doubles
← 1992 ·	WTA Auckland Open	· 1994 →

Robin White was the defending champion of the singles event at the Amway Classic tennis tournament, but lost in the first round.

Unseeded Elna Reinach won her first WTA title, defeating Caroline Kuhlman, who entered the competition with a wildcard, in the final, 6–0, 6–0.

== Seeds ==
1. (Germany) Sabine Hack (first round)
2. (Czechoslovakia) Andrea Strnadová (quarterfinals)
3. (United States) Robin White (first round)
4. (France) Noëlle van Lottum (first round)
5. (United States) Ginger Helgeson (quarterfinals)
6. (United Kingdom) Monique Javer (first round)
7. (Argentina) Inés Gorrochategui (semifinals)
8. (Germany) Karin Kschwendt (semifinals)

== Draw ==
=== Finals ===
Semifinals
7	(Argentina) Inés Gorrochategui	7	4	2
(South Africa) Elna Reinach	6	6	6
(United States) Caroline Kuhlman	4	7	6
8	(Germany) Karin Kschwendt	6	5	4

Final
(South Africa) Elna Reinach	6	6
(United States) Caroline Kuhlman	0	0

=== Top half ===
First round
1	(West Germany) Sabine Hack	2	6
(United Kingdom) Clare Wood	6	7
(Argentina) Patricia Tarabini	4	2
Q	(France) Nathalie Herreman	6	6
(Slovakia) Katarína Studeníková	4	1
(United States) Nicole Arendt	6	6
(Austria) Sandra Dopfer	5	2
7	(Argentina) Inés Gorrochategui	7	6
3	(United States) Robin White	4	7	4
(South Africa) Elna Reinach	6	5	6
(United States) Donna Faber	2	1
(France) Sandrine Testud	6	6
(West Germany) Marketa Kochta	3	3
(France) Alexandra Fusai	6	6
Q	(Australia) Jo-Anne Faull	3	1
5	(United States) Ginger Helgeson	6	6

Second round
(United Kingdom) Clare Wood	6	6
Q	(France) Nathalie Herreman	2	1
(United States) Nicole Arendt	4	6	2
7	(Argentina) Inés Gorrochategui	6	3	6
(South Africa) Elna Reinach	6	6
(France) Sandrine Testud	4	4
(France) Alexandra Fusai	6	3	0
5	(United States) Ginger Helgeson	3	6	6

Quarterfinals
(United Kingdom) Clare Wood	7	5	4
7	(Argentina) Inés Gorrochategui	5	7	6
(South Africa) Elna Reinach	6	6
5	(United States) Ginger Helgeson	2	4

Semifinals
7	(Argentina) Inés Gorrochategui	7	4	2
(South Africa) Elna Reinach	6	6	6

=== Bottom half ===
First round
6	(United Kingdom) Monique Javer	6	1	3
(Croatia) Nadin Ercegović	4	6	6
(Finland) Petra Thorén	4	3
(United States) Caroline Kuhlman	6	6
(Australia) Joanne Limmer	7	5	3
Q	(West Germany) Angela Kerek	6	7	6
4	(France) Noëlle van Lottum	6	3	6
WC	(New Zealand) Julie Richardson	2	6	7
8	(West Germany) Karin Kschwendt	6	6
(Australia) Kristin Godridge	0	1
(Switzerland) Christelle Fauche	6	4	6
WC	(New Zealand) Claudine Toleafoa	2	6	4
(Argentina) Bettina Fulco-Villella	4	3
(Belgium) Sandra Wasserman	6	6
(France) Isabelle Demongeot	4	7	4
2	(Czechoslovakia) Andrea Strnadová	6	5	6

Second round
(Croatia) Nadin Ercegović	4	5
(United States) Caroline Kuhlman	6	7
Q	(West Germany) Angela Kerek	4	6	6
WC	(New Zealand) Julie Richardson	6	2	1
8	(West Germany) Karin Kschwendt	6	6
(Switzerland) Christelle Fauche	0	0
(Belgium) Sandra Wasserman	3	2
2	(Czechoslovakia) Andrea Strnadová	6	6

Quarterfinals
(United States) Caroline Kuhlman	6	6
Q	(West Germany) Angela Kerek	4	1
8	(West Germany) Karin Kschwendt	7	6
2	(Czechoslovakia) Andrea Strnadová	5	4

Semifinals
(United States) Caroline Kuhlman	4	7	6
8	(West Germany) Karin Kschwendt	6	5	4
