= 1994 US Open – Women's singles =

Women's singles
- 1994 US Open

Final
- Champion: (Spain) Arantxa Sánchez Vicario
- Runner-up: (Germany) Steffi Graf
- Score: 1–6, 7–6^{(7–3)}, 6–4

Details
- Draw: 128
- Seeds: 16

Events
Singles	men	women		boys	girls
Doubles	men	women	mixed	boys	girls
WC Singles	men	women	quad
WC Doubles	men	women	quad
Legends	men	women	mixed
← 1993 ·	US Open	· 1995 →

Arantxa Sánchez Vicario defeated defending champion Steffi Graf in the final, 1–6, 7–6^{(7–3)}, 6–4 to win the women's singles tennis title at the 1994 US Open. It was her first US Open singles title and third major singles title overall.

== Seeds ==
1. (Germany) Steffi Graf (final)
2. (Spain) Arantxa Sánchez Vicario (champion)
3. (Spain) Conchita Martínez (third round)
4. (France) Mary Pierce (quarterfinals)
5. (Japan) Kimiko Date (quarterfinals)
6. (United States) Lindsay Davenport (third round)
7. (Czech Republic) Jana Novotná (semifinals)
8. (Argentina) Gabriela Sabatini (semifinals)
9. (United States) Mary Joe Fernández (third round)
10. (United States) Zina Garrison-Jackson (fourth round)
11. (South Africa) Amanda Coetzer (quarterfinals)
12. (Germany) Sabine Hack (first round)
13. (United States) Lori McNeil (first round)
14. (Germany) Anke Huber (second round)
15. (Bulgaria) Magdalena Maleeva (fourth round)
16. (United States) Amy Frazier (second round)

== Draw ==
=== Key ===
- Q = Qualifier
- WC = Wild card
- LL = Lucky loser
- Alt = Alternate
- ITF = ITF entry
- PR = Protected ranking
- SR = Special ranking
- SE = Special exempt
- JE = Junior exempt
- JR = Junior Accelerator Programme entrant
- CO = College Accelerator Programme entrant
- NG = Next Gen Accelerator Program entrant
- w/o = Walkover
- r = Retired
- d = Defaulted

=== Finals ===
Quarterfinals
1	(Germany) Steffi Graf	6	6
11	(South Africa) Amanda Coetzer	0	2
4	(France) Mary Pierce	4	0
7	(Czech Republic) Jana Novotná	6	6
8	(Argentina) Gabriela Sabatini	6	7
(United States) Gigi Fernández	2	5
5	(Japan) Kimiko Date	3	0
2	(Spain) Arantxa Sánchez Vicario	6	6

Semifinals
1	(Germany) Steffi Graf	6	7
7	(Czech Republic) Jana Novotná	3	5
8	(Argentina) Gabriela Sabatini	1	6
2	(Spain) Arantxa Sánchez Vicario	6	7

Finals
1	(Germany) Steffi Graf	6	6^{3}	4
2	(Spain) Arantxa Sánchez Vicario	1	7^{7}	6

=== Top half ===
==== Section 1 ====
First round
1	(Germany) S Graf	6	6
WC	(United States) A Mall	2	1
(United States) S Cacic	7	6
(Spain) Á Montolio	5	3
WC	(United States) J Watanabe	3	4
(Australia) N Bradtke	6	6
(Czech Republic) R Bobková	3	7	7
(United States) K Po	6	5	6
WC	(United States) A Lettiere	1	6
Q	(Argentina) MJ Gaidano	6	7
(France) A Dechaume-Balleret	6	6
(Netherlands) M Oremans	4	3
WC	(United States) J Steven	6	2
(Argentina) P Suárez	7	6
(Australia) K Radford	3	4
10	(United States) Z Garrison-Jackson	6	6

Second round
1	(Germany) S Graf	6	6
(United States) S Cacic	0	2
(Australia) N Bradtke	7	4	2
(Czech Republic) R Bobková	6	6	6
Q	(Argentina) MJ Gaidano	5	3
(France) A Dechaume-Balleret	7	6
(Argentina) P Suárez	4	3
10	(United States) Z Garrison-Jackson	6	6

Third round
1	(Germany) S Graf	6	6
(Czech Republic) R Bobková	2	3
(France) A Dechaume-Balleret	6	4	6
10	(United States) Z Garrison-Jackson	2	6	7

Fourth round
1	(Germany) S Graf	6	6
10	(United States) Z Garrison-Jackson	1	2

==== Section 2 ====
First round
11	(South Africa) A Coetzer	6	7
(Austria) P Ritter	1	6
(Russia) E Maniokova	4	6	2
(Canada) H Kelesi	6	2	0^{r}
(United States) M Werdel	6	2	6
(Czech Republic) L Richterová	3	6	4
Q	(South Africa) M de Swardt	6	6
(Indonesia) Y Basuki	3	4
(France) J Halard	6	3	6
(Czech Republic) P Langrová	1	6	2
(United States) T Whitlinger-Jones	4	6
(Japan) M Endo	6	7
(Austria) B Reinstadler	6	4
(United States) P Shriver	7	6
(Italy) M Grossi	1	1
6	(United States) L Davenport	6	6

Second round
11	(South Africa) A Coetzer	6	6
(Russia) E Maniokova	2	0
(United States) M Werdel	4	6	6
Q	(South Africa) M de Swardt	6	2	7
(France) J Halard	1	5
(Japan) M Endo	6	7
(United States) P Shriver	1	2
6	(United States) L Davenport	6	6

Third round
11	(South Africa) A Coetzer	6	6
Q	(South Africa) M de Swardt	1	3
(Japan) M Endo	6	7
6	(United States) L Davenport	3	6

Fourth round
11	(South Africa) A Coetzer	6	6
(Japan) M Endo	3	0

==== Section 3 ====
First round
4	(France) M Pierce	6	6
Q	(Hungary) A Temesvári	3	2
(Slovakia) K Studeníková	6	3	6
(United States) D Graham	3	6	4
(United States) C Kuhlman	6	6
(Germany) S Frankl	3	1
(Indonesia) R Tedjakusuma	2	0
(Austria) J Wiesner	6	6
(Croatia) I Majoli	6	2
(France) N van Lottum	1	0	r
Q	(South Africa) D Van Rensburg	3	6	4
(South Africa) E Reinach	6	2	6
(Netherlands) N Krijger-Jagerman	5	1
(Slovakia) J Husárová	7	6
(Israel) A Smashnova	6	6
13	(United States) L McNeil	2	4

Second round
4	(France) M Pierce	6	2	6
(Slovakia) K Studeníková	3	6	4
(United States) C Kuhlman	2	2
(Austria) J Wiesner	6	6
(Croatia) I Majoli	6	6
(South Africa) E Reinach	2	2
(Netherlands) N Krijger-Jagerman	2	6	3
(Israel) A Smashnova	6	3	6

Third round
4	(France) M Pierce	6	6
(Austria) J Wiesner	2	4
(Croatia) I Majoli	6	6
(Israel) A Smashnova	2	3

Fourth round
4	(France) M Pierce	6	6
(Croatia) I Majoli	1	2

==== Section 4 ====
First round
15	(Bulgaria) M Maleeva	6	6
(United States) C Rubin	3	3
(Netherlands) K Boogert	5	2
(Romania) R Dragomir	7	6
(Italy) A Serra Zanetti	0	4
(United States) L Harvey-Wild	6	6
(Japan) N Sawamatsu	6	6	4
(United States) S Stafford	2	7	6
(Mexico) A Gavaldón	7	7
(Argentina) B Fulco-Villella	5	6
(Argentina) F Labat	1	6
(Canada) P Hy	6	7
(Belgium) D Monami	3	2
(Slovakia) K Habšudová	6	6
(Russia) E Makarova	5	5
7	(Czech Republic) J Novotná	7	7

Second round
15	(Bulgaria) M Maleeva	7	6
(Romania) R Dragomir	5	3
(United States) L Harvey-Wild	0	7	2
(United States) S Stafford	6	6	6
(Mexico) A Gavaldón	3	2
(Canada) P Hy	6	6
(Slovakia) K Habšudová	2	3
7	(Czech Republic) J Novotná	6	6

Third round
15	(Bulgaria) M Maleeva	6	7
(United States) S Stafford	3	6
(Canada) P Hy	1	2
7	(Czech Republic) J Novotná	6	6

Fourth round
15	(Bulgaria) M Maleeva	0	4
7	(Czech Republic) J Novotná	6	6

=== Bottom half ===
==== Section 5 ====
First round
8	(Argentina) G Sabatini	6	6
(Latvia) L Neiland	0	1
(United States) M McGrath	6	6
(South Africa) T Price	1	2
(Slovakia) R Zrubáková	6	6
(Argentina) P Tarabini	2	2
Q	(France) L Ghirardi	2	3
Q	(France) I Demongeot	6	6
(Italy) S Farina	7	6	6
WC	(United States) M Tu	5	7	1
(South Africa) J Kruger	2	4
(Kazakhstan) E Likhovtseva	6	6
(Ukraine) N Medvedeva	4	6	7
(Austria) B Schett	6	2	6
(Australia) R McQuillan	0	3
16	(United States) A Frazier	6	6

Second round
8	(Argentina) G Sabatini	6	6	6
(United States) M McGrath	4	7	1
(Slovakia) R Zrubáková	6	1	2
Q	(France) I Demongeot	3	6	6
(Italy) S Farina	5	6	3
(Kazakhstan) E Likhovtseva	7	2	6
(Ukraine) N Medvedeva	6	6	6
16	(United States) A Frazier	2	7	4

Third round
8	(Argentina) G Sabatini	6	6
Q	(France) I Demongeot	0	2
(Kazakhstan) E Likhovtseva	7	7
(Ukraine) N Medvedeva	6	6

Fourth round
8	(Argentina) G Sabatini	6	6
(Kazakhstan) E Likhovtseva	2	1

==== Section 6 ====
First round
12	(Germany) S Hack	2	6	6
(United States) G Fernández	6	2	7
Q	(Ukraine) E Brioukhovets	5	5
(France) S Testud	7	7
(China) F Li	5	4
(Chinese Taipei) S-t Wang	7	6
(Japan) K Nagatsuka	6	6
(Austria) S Dopfer	1	3
(United States) G Helgeson	6	6
(Germany) K Kschwendt	2	1
(Sweden) Å Carlsson	4	6	6
(Belgium) N Feber	6	1	2
(United Kingdom) C Wood	2	6
(United States) N Arendt	6	7
(Germany) V Martinek	1	0
3	(Spain) C Martínez	6	6

Second round
(United States) G Fernández	7	6
(France) S Testud	5	3
(Chinese Taipei) S-t Wang	4	6	6
(Japan) K Nagatsuka	6	0	2
(United States) G Helgeson	6	6
(Sweden) Å Carlsson	1	1
(United States) N Arendt	3	3
3	(Spain) C Martínez	6	6

Third round
(United States) G Fernández	6	6
(Chinese Taipei) S-t Wang	3	2
(United States) G Helgeson	3	6	6
3	(Spain) C Martínez	6	4	1

Fourth round
(United States) G Fernández	6	6
(United States) G Helgeson	3	4

==== Section 7 ====
First round
5	(Japan) K Date	6	6
Q	(Japan) R Hiraki	0	2
(Italy) L Golarsa	4	4
(Japan) Y Kamio	6	6
(France) A Fusai	6	6
(Netherlands) B Schultz	4	3
(United States) L Raymond	7	6
WC	(United States) C Cunningham	6	4
(Germany) B Rittner	6	6
(Netherlands) M Bollegraf	2	1
(Czech Republic) E Martincová	3	0
(Switzerland) E Zardo	6	6
(Japan) A Sugiyama	1	4
(Georgia (country)) L Meskhi	6	6
(Romania) I Spîrlea	4	2
14	(Germany) A Huber	6	6

Second round
5	(Japan) K Date	6	6
(Japan) Y Kamio	0	2
(France) A Fusai	2	6	1
(United States) L Raymond	6	3	6
(Germany) B Rittner	6	6
(Switzerland) E Zardo	0	3
(Georgia (country)) L Meskhi	6	6
14	(Germany) A Huber	2	2

Third round
5	(Japan) K Date	6	6
(United States) L Raymond	4	2
(Germany) B Rittner	6	3	2
(Georgia (country)) L Meskhi	4	6	6

Fourth round
5	(Japan) K Date	6	6	7
(Georgia (country)) L Meskhi	2	7	5

==== Section 8 ====
First round
9	(United States) MJ Fernandez	6	6
(Belgium) S Appelmans	4	3
(United States) P Fendick	6	6	6
WC	(United States) K Adams	7	4	3
(United States) A Grossman	6	6
(Germany) C Singer	3	4
(Germany) M Kochta	1	2
(Bulgaria) K Maleeva	6	6
(Germany) S Meier	3	1
(Italy) A-M Cecchini	6	6
(Belgium) L Courtois	1	3
WC	(United States) A Keller	6	6
(France) N Tauziat	7	2	7
(Netherlands) S Rottier	5	6	5
(Italy) L Ferrando	5	1
2	(Spain) A Sánchez Vicario	7	6

Second round
9	(United States) MJ Fernandez	6	2	7
(United States) P Fendick	2	6	6
(United States) A Grossman	6	1	6
(Bulgaria) K Maleeva	4	6	1
(Italy) A-M Cecchini	6	3	6
WC	(United States) A Keller	3	6	4
(France) N Tauziat	2	6
2	(Spain) A Sánchez Vicario	6	7

Third round
9	(United States) MJ Fernandez	4	4
(United States) A Grossman	6	6
(Italy) A-M Cecchini	2	1
2	(Spain) A Sánchez Vicario	6	6

Fourth round
(United States) A Grossman	2	0
2	(Spain) A Sánchez Vicario	6	6

Preceded by 1994 Wimbledon Championships – Women's singles	Grand Slam women's singles	Succeeded by 1995 Australian Open – Women's singles
