= 1994 Brighton International =

- Date: 18–23 October
- Edition: 17th
- Category: Tier II
- Draw: 32S / 16D
- Prize money: $400,000
- Surface: Carpet (Supreme) / indoor
- Location: Brighton, England
- Venue: Brighton Centre

Champions

Singles
- (Czech Republic) Jana Novotná

Doubles
- (Netherlands) Manon Bollegraf / (Latvia) Larisa Neiland
- Brighton International

The 1994 Brighton International was a women's tennis tournament played on indoor carpet courts at the Brighton Centre in Brighton, England that was part of the Tier II of the 1994 WTA Tour. It was the 17th edition of the tournament and was held from 18 October until 23 October 1994. Second-seeded Jana Novotná won her second consecutive singles title at the event and earned $80,000 first-prize money.

== Finals ==
=== Singles ===
(Czech Republic) Jana Novotná defeated (Czech Republic) Helena Suková 6–7^{(4–7)}, 6–3, 6–4

- It was Novotná's 2nd singles title of the year and the 9th of her career.

=== Doubles ===
(Netherlands) Manon Bollegraf / (Latvia) Larisa Neiland defeated (United States) Mary Joe Fernandez / (Czech Republic) Jana Novotná 4–6, 6–2, 6–3

== Prize money ==
Event	W	F	SF	QF	Round of 16	Round of 32
Singles	$80,000	$36,000	$18,000	$9,000	$4,600	$2,400
