= 1994 Brighton International – Singles =

Singles
- 1994 Brighton International

Final
- Champion: (Czech Republic) Jana Novotná
- Runner-up: (Czech Republic) Helena Suková
- Score: 6–7^{(4–7)}, 6–3, 6–4

Details
- Draw: 32 (2WC/4Q)
- Seeds: 8

Events
Singles	Doubles
- Brighton International

Jana Novotná successfully defended her title by defeating Helena Suková 6–7^{(4–7)}, 6–3, 6–4 in the final.

== Seeds ==
1. (Spain) Conchita Martínez (quarterfinals)
2. (Czech Republic) Jana Novotná (champion)
3. (United States) Mary Joe Fernandez (first round)
4. (Germany) Anke Huber (second round)
5. (Germany) Sabine Hack (first round)
6. (Belgium) Sabine Appelmans (first round)
7. (France) Julie Halard (semifinals)
8. (United States) Chanda Rubin (first round)

== Draw ==
Key

- Q = Qualifier
- WC = Wild card
- LL = Lucky loser
- Alt = Alternate
- ITF = ITF entry
- PR = Protected ranking
- SR = Special ranking
- SE = Special exempt
- JE = Junior exempt
- JR = Junior Accelerator Programme entrant
- CO = College Accelerator Programme entrant
- NG = Next Gen Accelerator Program entrant
- w/o = Walkover
- r = Retired
- d = Defaulted

=== Finals ===
Semifinals
(Latvia) Larisa Neiland	4	6	5
(Czech Republic) Helena Suková	6	0	7
7	(France) Julie Halard	3	5
2	(Czech Republic) Jana Novotná	6	7

Final
(Czech Republic) Helena Suková	7^{7}	3	4
2	(Czech Republic) Jana Novotná	6^{4}	6	6

=== Top half ===
First round
1	(Spain) C Martínez	7^{8}	6
(Germany) W Probst	6^{6}	0
(Austria) P Ritter	6	6
(Germany) S Frankl	3	1
(Australia) K Radford	3	1
(Indonesia) Y Basuki	6	6
(Latvia) L Neiland	6	7^{7}
6	(Belgium) S Appelmans	0	6^{4}
4	(Germany) A Huber	6	3	6
Q	(Kazakhstan) E Likhovtseva	4	6	4
(Sweden) Å Carlsson	6^{1}	5
(France) N Tauziat	7^{7}	7
(Czech Republic) H Suková	6	6
(Austria) S Dopfer	2	1
(United States) T Whitlinger-Jones	6	6
8	(United States) C Rubin	1	4

Second round
1	(Spain) C Martínez	6	6
(Austria) P Ritter	3	4
(Indonesia) Y Basuki	6	3	3
(Latvia) L Neiland	4	6	6
4	(Germany) A Huber	5	4
(France) N Tauziat	7	6
(Czech Republic) H Suková	6	6
(United States) T Whitlinger-Jones	1	2

Quarterfinals
1	(Spain) C Martínez	1	3
(Latvia) L Neiland	6	6
(France) N Tauziat	4	5
(Czech Republic) H Suková	6	7

Semifinals
(Latvia) L Neiland	4	6	5
(Czech Republic) H Suková	6	0	7

=== Bottom half ===
First round
7	(France) J Halard	6	6
WC	(United Kingdom) C Wood	3	2
WC	(United States) G Fernández	6	6
(Israel) A Smashnova	4	2
(Germany) M Babel	6	6
Q	(Austria) B Schett	3	2
(United States) P Fendick	4	6	6
3	(United States) MJ Fernandez	6	3	2
5	(Germany) S Hack	3	2
(Bulgaria) K Maleeva	6	6
Q	(Venezuela) M Vento	6	7
(United States) G Helgeson	3	5
(South Africa) E Reinach	3	3
(Canada) P Hy	6	6
Q	(South Africa) J Kruger	6	0	4
2	(Czech Republic) J Novotná	2	6	6

Second round
7	(France) J Halard	6	5	7^{7}
WC	(United States) G Fernández	4	7	6^{3}
(Germany) M Babel	6	6^{1}	6
(United States) P Fendick	4	7^{7}	3
(Bulgaria) K Maleeva	6	5	6
Q	(Venezuela) M Vento	4	7	4
(Canada) P Hy	2	2
2	(Czech Republic) J Novotná	6	6

Quarterfinals
7	(France) J Halard	6	6
(Germany) M Babel	4	1
(Bulgaria) K Maleeva	4	2
2	(Czech Republic) J Novotná	6	6

Semifinals
7	(France) J Halard	3	5
2	(Czech Republic) J Novotná	6	7
