= 1994 Acura U.S. Women's Hardcourts =

- Date: July 25–31
- Edition: 29th
- Category: Tier II
- Draw: 32S / 16D
- Prize money: $400,000
- Surface: Hard / outdoor
- Location: Stratton Mountain, Vermont, United States
- Venue: Stratton Mountain Sports Center

Champions

Singles
- (Spain) Conchita Martínez

Doubles
- (United States) Pam Shriver / (Australia) Elizabeth Smylie
- U.S. Women's Hardcourt Championships

The 1994 Acura U.S. Women's Hardcourts was a women's tennis tournament played on outdoor hard courts at the Stratton Mountain Sports Center in Stratton Mountain, Vermont in the United States and was part of the Tier II category of the 1994 WTA Tour. It was the 29th edition of the tournament and was held from July 25 through July 31, 1994. Second-seeded Conchita Martínez won her second consecutive singles title at the event and earned $80,000 first-prize money.

== Finals ==
=== Singles ===
(Spain) Conchita Martínez defeated (Spain) Arantxa Sánchez Vicario 6–3, 6–2

- It was Martínez' 4th singles title of the year and the 20th of her career.

=== Doubles ===
(United States) Pam Shriver / (Australia) Elizabeth Smylie defeated (Spain) Conchita Martínez / (Spain) Arantxa Sánchez Vicario 7–6^{(7–4)}, 2–6, 7–5

- It was Shriver's 2nd and last doubles title of the year and the 111th and last of her career. It was Smylie's 2nd doubles title of the year and the 35th of her career.
