= 1994 Brighton International – Doubles =

Doubles
- 1994 Brighton International

Final
- Champions: (Netherlands) Manon Bollegraf (Latvia) Larisa Neiland
- Runners-up: (United States) Mary Joe Fernandez (Czech Republic) Jana Novotná
- Score: 4–6, 6–2, 6–3

Details
- Draw: 16 (1WC/1Q/1LL)
- Seeds: 4

Events
Singles	Doubles
- Brighton International

Laura Golarsa and Natalia Medvedeva were the defending champions, but none competed this year.

Manon Bollegraf and Larisa Neiland won the title by defeating Mary Joe Fernandez and Jana Novotná 4–6, 6–2, 6–3 in the final.

== Seeds ==
1. (Netherlands) Manon Bollegraf / (Latvia) Larisa Neiland (champions)
2. (United States) Mary Joe Fernandez / (Czech Republic) Jana Novotná (final)
3. (France) Julie Halard / (France) Nathalie Tauziat (quarterfinals)
4. (Bulgaria) Katerina Maleeva / (Russia) Eugenia Maniokova (quarterfinals)

== Draw ==
Key

- Q = Qualifier
- WC = Wild card
- LL = Lucky loser
- Alt = Alternate
- ITF = ITF entry
- PR = Protected ranking
- SR = Special ranking
- SE = Special exempt
- JE = Junior exempt
- JR = Junior Accelerator Programme entrant
- CO = College Accelerator Programme entrant
- NG = Next Gen Accelerator Program entrant
- w/o = Walkover
- r = Retired
- d = Defaulted

=== Draw ===
First round
1	(Netherlands) M Bollegraf (Latvia) L Neiland	6	7
(Australia) K Radford (Netherlands) C Vis	2	5
WC	(United Kingdom) SA Siddall (United Kingdom) A Wainwright	4	1
(Germany) M Babel (Sweden) Å Carlsson	6	6
4	(Bulgaria) K Maleeva (Russia) E Maniokova	4	6	7^{7}
Q	(Sweden) M Lindström (Sweden) M Strandlund	6	4	6^{1}
(United States) L Harvey Wild (Canada) P Hy	6	6
(United Kingdom) V Lake (United Kingdom) C Wood	3	4
(United States) K Adams (United States) D Graham	7^{7}	7^{11}
(Germany) W Probst (Germany) C Singer	6^{5}	6^{9}
(United States) G Helgeson-Nielsen (United States) C Rubin	1	4
3	(France) J Halard (France) N Tauziat	6	6
(Indonesia) Y Basuki (Japan) N Miyagi	6	3	6
LL	(Netherlands) C Bakkum (Finland) N Dahlman	2	6	4
(Kazakhstan) E Likhovtseva (Germany) C Schneider	2	1
2	(United States) MJ Fernandez (Czech Republic) J Novotná	6	6

Quarterfinals
1	(Netherlands) M Bollegraf (Latvia) L Neiland	6	6
(Germany) M Babel (Sweden) Å Carlsson	1	3
4	(Bulgaria) K Maleeva (Russia) E Maniokova	1	6	2
(United States) L Harvey Wild (Canada) P Hy	6	4	6
(United States) K Adams (United States) D Graham	6	2	6
3	(France) J Halard (France) N Tauziat	3	6	2
(Indonesia) Y Basuki (Japan) N Miyagi	1	6	4
2	(United States) MJ Fernandez (Czech Republic) J Novotná	6	3	6

Semifinals
1	(Netherlands) M Bollegraf (Latvia) L Neiland	7	6
(United States) L Harvey Wild (Canada) P Hy	5	2
(United States) K Adams (United States) D Graham	4	7	4
2	(United States) MJ Fernandez (Czech Republic) J Novotná	6	5	6

Final
1	(Netherlands) M Bollegraf (Latvia) L Neiland	4	6	6
2	(United States) MJ Fernandez (Czech Republic) J Novotná	6	2	3
