= 1995 Amway Classic =

- Date: 30 January – 5 February
- Edition: 10th
- Category: Tier IV
- Draw: 32S / 16D
- Prize money: $107,500
- Surface: Hard / outdoor
- Location: Auckland, New Zealand
- Venue: ASB Tennis Centre

Champions

Singles
- (Australia) Nicole Bradtke

Doubles
- (Canada) Jill Hetherington / (South Africa) Elna Reinach
| ← 1994 · | WTA Auckland Open | · 1996 → |

The 1995 Amway Classic was a women's tennis tournament played on outdoor hard courts at the ASB Tennis Centre in Auckland, New Zealand that was part of Tier IV of the 1995 WTA Tour. It was the 10th edition of the tournament and was held from 30 January until 5 February 1995. Unseeded Nicole Bradtke, who entered on a wildcard, won the singles title and earned $17,5000 first-prize money.

== Finals ==
=== Singles ===
(Australia) Nicole Bradtke defeated (United States) Ginger Helgeson-Nielsen 3–6, 6–2, 6–1

- It was Bradtke's only title of the year and the 11th of her career.

=== Doubles ===
(Canada) Jill Hetherington / (South Africa) Elna Reinach defeated (Italy) Laura Golarsa / (Netherlands) Caroline Vis 7–6, 6–2

- It was Hetherington's 1st title of the year and the 14th of her career. It was Reinach's only title of the year and the 11th of her career.

== See also ==
- 1995 Benson and Hedges Open – men's tournament
