= 1994 International Damen Grand Prix Leipzig =

- Date: 26 September – 2 October
- Edition: 5th
- Category: Tier II
- Draw: 32S / 12D
- Prize money: $400,000
- Surface: Carpet / indoor
- Location: Leipzig, Germany
- Venue: Messehalle 7

Champions

Singles
- (Czechoslovakia) Jana Novotná

Doubles
- (United States) Patty Fendick (United States) Meredith McGrath
- WTA Leipzig

The 1994 International Damen Grand Prix Leipzig was a women's tennis tournament played on indoor carpet courts at the Messehalle 7 in Leipzig in Germany that was part of the Tier II category of the 1994 WTA Tour. It was the fifth edition of the tournament and was held from 26 September through 2 October 1994. Second-seeded Jana Novotná won the singles title and earned $80,000 first-prize money.

== Finals ==
=== Singles ===
(Czech Republic) Jana Novotná defeated (France) Mary Pierce 7–5, 6–1

- It was Novotna's 1st singles title of the year and the 8th of her career.

=== Doubles ===
(United States) Patty Fendick / (United States) Meredith McGrath defeated (Netherlands) Manon Bollegraf / (Latvia) Larisa Neiland 6–4, 6–4

- It was Fendick's 5th doubles title of the year and the 25th of her career. It was McGrath's 7th doubles title of the year and the 16th of her career.
