= 1994 International Damen Grand Prix Leipzig – Doubles =

Doubles
- 1994 International Damen Grand Prix Leipzig

Final
- Champions: (United States) Patty Fendick (United States) Meredith McGrath
- Runners-up: (Netherlands) Manon Bollegraf (Latvia) Larisa Neiland
- Score: 6–4, 6–4

Details
- Draw: 16 (1WC/1Q)
- Seeds: 4

Events
Singles	Doubles
- Sparkassen Cup

Gigi Fernández and Natasha Zvereva were the defending champions, but none competed this year.

Patty Fendick and Meredith McGrath won the title by defeating Manon Bollegraf and Larisa Neiland 6–4, 6–4 in the final.

== Seeds ==
1. (United States) Patty Fendick / (United States) Meredith McGrath (champions)
2. (Netherlands) Manon Bollegraf / (Latvia) Larisa Neiland (final)
3. (Italy) Laura Golarsa / (Czech Republic) Jana Novotná (semifinals)
4. (Bulgaria) Katerina Maleeva / (Netherlands) Brenda Schultz (quarterfinals)

== Draw ==
Key

- Q = Qualifier
- WC = Wild card
- LL = Lucky loser
- Alt = Alternate
- ITF = ITF entry
- PR = Protected ranking
- SR = Special ranking
- SE = Special exempt
- JE = Junior exempt
- JR = Junior Accelerator Programme entrant
- CO = College Accelerator Programme entrant
- NG = Next Gen Accelerator Program entrant
- w/o = Walkover
- r = Retired
- d = Defaulted

=== Draw ===
First round
1	(United States) P Fendick (United States) M McGrath	6	6
(Sweden) M Lindström (Sweden) M Strandlund	3	2
WC	(Netherlands) C Bakkum (Netherlands) S Noorlander	6^{4}	2
(Belgium) L Courtois (Romania) I Spîrlea	7^{7}	6
4	(Bulgaria) K Maleeva (Netherlands) B Schultz	7^{7}	6
(Italy) S Farina (Germany) C Schneider	6^{4}	4
Q	(Germany) K Kschwendt (Germany) W Probst
(Sweden) Å Carlsson (Ukraine) O Lugina	w/o
(United States) A Grossman (United States) K Po	5	1
(Italy) S Cecchini (Romania) R Dragomir	7	6
(Netherlands) K Boogert (Netherlands) N Muns-Jagerman	4	6^{5}
3	(Italy) L Golarsa (Czech Republic) J Novotná	6	7^{7}
(Germany) A Huber (Ukraine) N Medvedeva	6	6^{5}	2
(Belgium) S Appelmans (Netherlands) M Oremans	2	7^{7}	6
(Germany) B Rittner (Germany) C Singer	3	3
2	(Netherlands) M Bollegraf (Latvia) L Neiland	6	6

Quarterfinals
1	(United States) P Fendick (United States) M McGrath	6	6
(Belgium) L Courtois (Romania) I Spîrlea	2	3
4	(Bulgaria) K Maleeva (Netherlands) B Schultz	3	4
(Sweden) Å Carlsson (Ukraine) O Lugina	6	6
(Italy) S Cecchini (Romania) R Dragomir	2	2
3	(Italy) L Golarsa (Czech Republic) J Novotná	6	6
(Belgium) S Appelmans (Netherlands) M Oremans	4	4
2	(Netherlands) M Bollegraf (Latvia) L Neiland	6	6

Semifinals
1	(United States) P Fendick (United States) M McGrath	6	6
(Sweden) Å Carlsson (Ukraine) O Lugina	3	2
3	(Italy) L Golarsa (Czech Republic) J Novotná	3	5
2	(Netherlands) M Bollegraf (Latvia) L Neiland	6	7

Final
1	(United States) P Fendick (United States) M McGrath	6	6
2	(Netherlands) M Bollegraf (Latvia) L Neiland	4	4
