= 1994 International Damen Grand Prix Leipzig – Singles =

Singles
- 1994 International Damen Grand Prix Leipzig

Final
- Champion: (Czech Republic) Jana Novotná
- Runner-up: (France) Mary Pierce
- Score: 7–5, 6–1

Details
- Draw: 32 (1WC/4Q)
- Seeds: 8

Events
Singles	Doubles
- Sparkassen Cup

Steffi Graf was the defending champion, but did not compete this year.

Jana Novotná won the title by defeating Mary Pierce 7–5, 6–1 in the final.

== Seeds ==
1. (France) Mary Pierce (final)
2. (Czech Republic) Jana Novotná (champion)
3. (Germany) Anke Huber (semifinals)
4. (Croatia) Iva Majoli (quarterfinals)
5. (Belgium) Sabine Appelmans (first round)
6. (Austria) Judith Wiesner (semifinals)
7. (Netherlands) Brenda Schultz (quarterfinals)
8. (United States) Ann Grossman (first round)

== Draw ==
Key

- Q = Qualifier
- WC = Wild card
- LL = Lucky loser
- Alt = Alternate
- ITF = ITF entry
- PR = Protected ranking
- SR = Special ranking
- SE = Special exempt
- JE = Junior exempt
- JR = Junior Accelerator Programme entrant
- CO = College Accelerator Programme entrant
- NG = Next Gen Accelerator Program entrant
- w/o = Walkover
- r = Retired
- d = Defaulted

=== Finals ===
Semifinals
1	(France) Mary Pierce	6	7
6	(Austria) Judith Wiesner	2	5
3	(Germany) Anke Huber	6	1	5
2	(Czech Republic) Jana Novotná	1	6	7

Final
1	(France) Mary Pierce	5	1
2	(Czech Republic) Jana Novotná	7	6

=== Top half ===
First round
1	(France) M Pierce	6	6
WC	(Germany) J Kandarr	1	2
(United States) M Werdel	6	6
(Bulgaria) K Maleeva	4	2
(United States) P Fendick	5	2
(Germany) C Singer	7	6
(Netherlands) M Oremans	6^{2}	4
7	(Netherlands) B Schultz	7^{7}	6
4	(Croatia) I Majoli	6	6
(Latvia) L Neiland	0	4
(United States) L Raymond	6	6
(Germany) W Probst	2	2
(Italy) S Farina	6	6
Q	(Romania) R Dragomir	1	0
(Belgium) D Monami	4	7^{7}	4
6	(Austria) J Wiesner	6	6^{4}	6

Second round
1	(France) M Pierce	6	6
(United States) M Werdel	0	1
(Germany) C Singer	2	3
7	(Netherlands) B Schultz	6	6
4	(Croatia) I Majoli	6	6
(United States) L Raymond	0	4
(Italy) S Farina	3	1
6	(Austria) J Wiesner	6	6

Quarterfinals
1	(France) M Pierce	6	6
7	(Netherlands) B Schultz	3	2
4	(Croatia) I Majoli	5	4
6	(Austria) J Wiesner	7	6

Semifinals
1	(France) M Pierce	6	7
6	(Austria) J Wiesner	2	5

=== Bottom half ===
First round
5	(Belgium) S Appelmans	1	5
(Germany) B Rittner	6	7
(Ukraine) N Medvedeva	6	6
Q	(Czech Republic) A Strnadová	4	3
(Netherlands) S Rottier	6	7^{9}
Q	(Sweden) M Strandlund	3	6^{7}
(Netherlands) K Boogert	2	2
3	(Germany) A Huber	6	6
8	(United States) A Grossman	4	4
(Italy) S Cecchini	6	6
(United States) K Po	6	6
(Romania) I Spîrlea	2	4
Q	(Sweden) Å Carlsson	6	6
(Germany) M Kochta	2	1
(United States) M McGrath	6	0	5
2	(Czech Republic) J Novotná	3	6	7

Second round
(Germany) B Rittner	1	6	7^{7}
(Ukraine) N Medvedeva	6	3	6^{5}
(Netherlands) S Rottier	3	3
3	(Germany) A Huber	6	6
(Italy) S Cecchini	6	6
(United States) K Po	2	4
Q	(Sweden) Å Carlsson	2	5
2	(Czech Republic) J Novotná	6	7

Quarterfinals
(Germany) B Rittner	3^{r}
3	(Germany) A Huber	3
(Italy) S Cecchini	3	2
2	(Czech Republic) J Novotná	6	6

Semifinals
3	(Germany) A Huber	6	1	5
2	(Czech Republic) J Novotná	1	6	7
