= Kim de Weille =

Dutch tennis player

- Country (sports): Netherlands
- Born: April 1976
- Plays: Right-handed
- Prize money: $91,227

Singles
- Career record: 169–116
- Career titles: 6 ITF
- Highest ranking: No. 116 (13 February 1995)

Doubles
- Career record: 64–53
- Career titles: 4 ITF
- Highest ranking: No. 139 (15 April 1996)

Grand Slam doubles results
- Australian Open: 1R (1996)

Kim de Weille (born April 1976) is a Dutch former professional tennis player.

== Biography ==
=== Tennis career ===
A right-handed player, de Weille had a best singles ranking of 116 in the world and won six singles titles on the ITF Women's Circuit. This included an $25k event in Prostějov in 1994 where she beat an up and coming Martina Hingis in the semifinals.

Her best performance on the WTA Tour came at the 1995 Amway Classic in Auckland, making it through to the quarterfinals, with wins over Bettina Fulco-Villella and top 50 player Linda Harvey-Wild.

She featured in the singles qualifying draws of all four grand slam tournaments during her career and reached the final round of qualifying at the 1995 US Open. As a doubles player she played in the main draw of the 1996 Australian Open, with Seda Noorlander.

=== Personal life ===
De Weille has two children with husband Menco and lives in Leimuiden.

== ITF finals ==
Legend
$75,000 tournaments
$25,000 tournaments
$10,000 tournaments

=== Singles (6–4) ===
| Result | No. | Date | Tournament | Surface | Opponent | Score |
|---|---|---|---|---|---|---|
| Win | 1. | 11 October 1993 | Burgdorf, Switzerland | Carpet (i) | (Czech Republic) Lenka Cenková | 6–2, 6–1 |
| Win | 2. | 13 March 1994 | Prostějov, Czech Republic | Hard | (Italy) Federica Fortuni | 6–2, 7–6^{(7–4)} |
| Loss | 3. | 17 October 1994 | Flensburg, Germany | Carpet (i) | (Netherlands) Yvette Basting | 6–4, 5–7, 0–6 |
| Loss | 4. | 24 October 1994 | Poitiers, France | Hard (i) | (Netherlands) Yvette Basting | 1–6, 7–5, 4–6 |
| Win | 5. | 14 November 1994 | Eastbourne, England | Carpet (i) | (Netherlands) Yvette Basting | 6–1, 6–4 |
| Win | 6. | 25 May 1997 | Zaragoza, Spain | Clay | (Spain) Lourdes Domínguez Lino | 6–4, 6–3 |
| Win | 7. | 5 October 1997 | Lerida, Spain | Clay | (Spain) Conchita Martínez Granados | 7–6, 6–2 |
| Loss | 8. | 7 February 1999 | Sheffield, England | Hard (i) | (Belgium) Kim Clijsters | 3–6, 1–6 |
| Win | 9. | 2 April 2000 | Amiens, France | Clay (i) | (Romania) Magda Mihalache | 6–2, 6–3 |

=== Doubles (4–7) ===
| Result | No. | Date | Tournament | Surface | Partner | Opponents | Score |
|---|---|---|---|---|---|---|---|
| Loss | 1. | 22 February 1993 | Lisbon, Portugal | Hard | (Netherlands) Lara Bitter | (Netherlands) Maaike Koutstaal (Netherlands) Linda Niemantsverdriet | 4–6, 3–6 |
| Loss | 2. | 29 October 1995 | Poitiers, France | Hard (i) | (Netherlands) Nathalie Thijssen | (Netherlands) Seda Noorlander (Germany) Kirstin Freye | 4–6, 4–6 |
| Loss | 3. | 25 February 1996 | Redbridge, England | Hard | (Netherlands) Yvette Basting | (Italy) Laura Golarsa (United States) Julie Steven | 3–6, 4–6 |
| Loss | 4. | 21 April 1996 | Murcia, Spain | Clay | (France) Noëlle van Lottum | (Germany) Silke Meier (Austria) Petra Schwarz | 3–6, 3–6 |
| Win | 5. | 24 May 1997 | Zaragoza, Spain | Clay | (Hungary) Nóra Köves | (Spain) Eva Bes (Spain) Lourdes Domínguez Lino | 7–6^{(7–4)}, 6–4 |
| Win | 6. | 31 May 1997 | Barcelona, Spain | Clay | (Netherlands) Amanda Hopmans | (Hungary) Katalin Marosi (Argentina) Veronica Stele | 6–4, 5–7, 6–4 |
| Loss | 7. | 31 August 1997 | Orbetello, Italy | Clay | (Netherlands) Henriëtte van Aalderen | (Czech Republic) Kateřina Kroupová-Šišková (Germany) Silke Meier | 3–6, 6–2, 2–6 |
| Win | 8. | 26 April 1998 | Espinho, Portugal | Clay | (France) Noëlle van Lottum | (Germany) Kirstin Freye (Germany) Silke Meier | 4–6, 6–3, 7–5 |
| Loss | 9. | 6 February 1999 | Sheffield, England | Hard (i) | (South Africa) Surina De Beer | (United Kingdom) Lizzie Jelfs (United Kingdom) Lorna Woodroffe | 6–3, 4–6, 3–6 |
| Win | 10. | 13 February 1999 | Birmingham, England | Hard (i) | (South Africa) Surina De Beer | (Germany) Angelika Bachmann (Romania) Magda Mihalache | 6–4, 6–1 |
| Loss | 11. | 30 July 2000 | Les Contamines, France | Hard | (France) Carine Bornu | (France) Caroline Dhenin (Germany) Bianka Lamade | 7–6^{(7–4)}, 4–6, 4–6 |
