= 1994 Amway Classic – Doubles =

Doubles
- 1994 Amway Classic
- 1993 Champions: (France) Isabelle Demongeot (South Africa) Elna Reinach

Final
- Champions: (Canada) Patricia Hy (Argentina) Mercedes Paz
- Runners-up: (Australia) Jenny Byrne (New Zealand) Julie Richardson
- Score: 6–4, 7–6^{(7–3)}

Details
- Draw: 16
- Seeds: 4

Events
Singles	Doubles
← 1993 ·	WTA Auckland Open	· 1995 →

Isabelle Demongeot and Elna Reinach were the defending champions but only Reinach competed that year with Andrea Strnadová.

Reinach and Strnadová lost in the semifinals to Jenny Byrne and Julie Richardson.

Patricia Hy and Mercedes Paz won in the final 6–4, 7–6^{(7–3)} against Byrne and Richardson.

== Seeds ==
Champion seeds are indicated in bold text while text in italics indicates the round in which those seeds were eliminated.

1. (Argentina) Inés Gorrochategui / (Netherlands) Caroline Vis (semifinals)
2. (South Africa) Elna Reinach / (Czech Republic) Andrea Strnadová (semifinals)
3. (Australia) Jenny Byrne / (New Zealand) Julie Richardson (final)
4. (Canada) **Patricia Hy** / (Argentina) **Mercedes Paz (champions)**

== Draw ==
=== Key ===
- Q = Qualifier
- WC = Wild card
- LL = Lucky loser
- Alt = Alternate
- SE = Special exempt
- PR = Protected ranking
- ITF = ITF entry
- JE = Junior exempt
- w/o = Walkover
- r = Retired
- d = Defaulted
- SR = Special ranking

First round
1	(Argentina) **I Gorrochategui** (Netherlands) **C Vis**	**6**	**6**
(Finland) N Dahlman (France) A Fusai	2	3
(Australia) J-A Faull (South Africa) T Price	4	2
(Poland) **M Mroz** (United States) **S Reece**	**6**	**6**
4	(Canada) **P Hy** (Argentina) **M Paz**	**6**	**6**
(Germany) V Martinek (Brazil) A Vieira	4	1
Q	(South Africa) **J Kruger** (Japan) **M Miyauchi**	**6**	**6**
WC	(New Zealand) N Kaiwai (New Zealand) C Toleafoa	2	2
(France) **J Halard** (Germany) **K Kschwendt**	**7^{7}**	**6**
(United States) A deLone (United States) E deLone	6^{4}	2
(Australia) K McDonald (Australia) N Pratt	3	6^{1}
3	(Australia) **J Byrne** (New Zealand) **J Richardson**	**6**	**7^{7}**
(United States) C Benjamin (United States) J Steven	**6**	5	0
(Australia) **R Mawdsley** (Australia) **A Woolcock**	3	**7**	**6**
(Australia) K Godridge (France) N van Lottum	4	**6**	0
2	(South Africa) **E Reinach** (Czech Republic) **A Strnadová**	**6**	1	**6**

Quarterfinals
1	(Argentina) **I Gorrochategui** (Netherlands) **C Vis**	**6**	**6**
(Poland) M Mroz (United States) S Reece	2	4
4	(Canada) **P Hy** (Argentina) **M Paz**	**6**	3	**7**
Q	(South Africa) J Kruger (Japan) M Miyauchi	0	**6**	5
(France) J Halard (Germany) K Kschwendt	6^{3}	1
3	(Australia) **J Byrne** (New Zealand) **J Richardson**	**7^{7}**	**6**
(Australia) R Mawdsley (Australia) A Woolcock	4	3
2	(South Africa) **E Reinach** (Czech Republic) **A Strnadová**	**6**	**6**

Semifinals
1	(Argentina) I Gorrochategui (Netherlands) C Vis	4	3
4	(Canada) **P Hy** (Argentina) **M Paz**	**6**	**6**
3	(Australia) **J Byrne** (New Zealand) **J Richardson**	**6**	**7^{7}**
2	(South Africa) E Reinach (Czech Republic) A Strnadová	4	6^{4}

Final
4	(Canada) **Patricia Hy** (Argentina) **Mercedes Paz**	**6**	**7^{7}**
3	(Australia) Jenny Byrne (New Zealand) Julie Richardson	4	6^{3}
