= 1994 Amway Classic – Singles =

Singles
- 1994 Amway Classic

Final
- Champion: (United States) Ginger Helgeson
- Runner-up: (Argentina) Inés Gorrochategui
- Score: 7–6^{(7–4)}, 6–3

Details
- Draw: 32
- Seeds: 8

Events
Singles	Doubles
← 1993 ·	Amway Classic	· 1995 →

Elna Reinach was the defending champion but lost in the first round to Andrea Strnadová.

Ginger Helgeson won in the final 7–6^{(7–4)}, 6–3 against Inés Gorrochategui.

== Seeds ==
A champion seed is indicated in bold text while text in italics indicates the round in which that seed was eliminated.

1. (France) Julie Halard (semifinals)
2. (Canada) Patricia Hy (semifinals)
3. (United States) **Ginger Helgeson (champion)**
4. (Argentina) Inés Gorrochategui (final)
5. (South Africa) Elna Reinach (first round)
6. (Switzerland) Emanuela Zardo (second round)
7. (France) Alexandra Fusai (first round)
8. (Germany) Karin Kschwendt (second round)

== Draw ==
=== Key ===
- Q = Qualifier
- WC = Wild card
- LL = Lucky loser
- Alt = Alternate
- SE = Special exempt
- PR = Protected ranking
- ITF = ITF entry
- JE = Junior exempt
- w/o = Walkover
- r = Retired
- d = Defaulted
- SR = Special ranking

First round
1	(France) **J Halard**	**6**	**6**
WC	(New Zealand) C Toleafoa	0	0
(France) **N van Lottum**	**6**	**6**
Q	(United States) E deLone	4	2
(Israel) **A Smashnova**	6^{0}	**6**	**6**
(Austria) B Schett	**7^{7}**	4	4
Q	(Australia) J Taylor	2	3
8	(Germany) **K Kschwendt**	**6**	**6**
4	(Argentina) **I Gorrochategui**	**6**	**6**
WC	(New Zealand) J Richardson	2	1
(Finland) N Dahlman	**6**	3	2
(Belgium) **S Wasserman**	4	**6**	**6**
(Brazil) A Vieira	2	2
(South Africa) **T Price**	**6**	**6**
Q	(Netherlands) C Vis	1	**6**	4
6	(Switzerland) **E Zardo**	**6**	2	**6**
5	(South Africa) E Reinach	2	**6**	3
(Czech Republic) **A Strnadová**	**6**	1	**6**
(France) A Dechaume-Balleret	**6**	2	4
(Germany) **V Martinek**	4	**6**	**6**
(Paraguay) R de los Ríos	3	5
(United States) **A Henricksson**	**6**	**7**
(Croatia) N Ercegović	3	3
3	(United States) **G Helgeson**	**6**	**6**
7	(France) A Fusai	5	1
(United States) **J Watanabe**	**7**	**6**
(Australia) **N Pratt**	**6**	**6**
(Australia) K Godridge	2	3
Q	(Canada) M Drake	2	1
(Japan) **M Miyauchi**	**6**	**6**
(South Africa) J Kruger	1	2
2	(Canada) **P Hy**	**6**	**6**

Second round
1	(France) **J Halard**	**6**	**7**
(France) N van Lottum	4	5
(Israel) **A Smashnova**	**6**	2	**6**
8	(Germany) K Kschwendt	1	**6**	2
4	(Argentina) **I Gorrochategui**	**6**	**6**
(Belgium) S Wasserman	1	4
(South Africa) **T Price**	**7^{9}**	**6**
6	(Switzerland) E Zardo	6^{7}	4
(Czech Republic) A Strnadová	4	1
(Germany) **V Martinek**	**6**	**6**
(United States) A Henricksson	4	2
3	(United States) **G Helgeson**	**6**	**6**
(United States) **J Watanabe**	**6**	6^{5}	**7**
(Australia) N Pratt	2	**7^{7}**	5
(Japan) M Miyauchi	1	1
2	(Canada) **P Hy**	**6**	**6**

Quarterfinals
1	(France) **J Halard**	**6**	**6**
(Israel) A Smashnova	3	3
4	(Argentina) **I Gorrochategui**	**6**	**6**
(South Africa) T Price	3	3
(Germany) V Martinek	1	1
3	(United States) **G Helgeson**	**6**	**6**
(United States) J Watanabe	**6**	0	1
2	(Canada) **P Hy**	4	**6**	**6**

Semifinals
1	(France) J Halard	**6**	2	4
4	(Argentina) **I Gorrochategui**	4	**6**	**6**
3	(United States) **G Helgeson**	**6**	**6**
2	(Canada) P Hy	4	2

Final
4	(Argentina) Inés Gorrochategui	6^{4}	3
3	(United States) **Ginger Helgeson**	**7^{7}**	**6**
