= 1994 US Open – Mixed doubles =

Mixed doubles
- 1994 US Open

Final
- Champions: (South Africa) Elna Reinach (United States) Patrick Galbraith
- Runners-up: (Czech Republic) Jana Novotná (Australia) Todd Woodbridge
- Score: 6–2, 6–4

Details
- Draw: 32
- Seeds: 8

Events
Singles	men	women		boys	girls
Doubles	men	women	mixed	boys	girls
WC Singles	men	women	quad
WC Doubles	men	women	quad
Legends	men	women	mixed
- US Open

Helena Suková and Todd Woodbridge were the defending champions but only Woodbridge competed that year with Jana Novotná.

Novotná and Woodbridge lost in the final 6–2, 6–4 against Elna Reinach and Patrick Galbraith.

== Seeds ==
Champion seeds are indicated in bold text while text in italics indicates the round in which those seeds were eliminated.

1. (Czech Republic) Jana Novotná / (Australia) Todd Woodbridge (final)
2. (United States) Meredith McGrath / (Australia) Mark Woodforde (quarterfinals)
3. (United States) Gigi Fernández / (Czech Republic) Cyril Suk (semifinals)
4. (Latvia) Larisa Neiland / (Russia) Andrei Olhovskiy (second round)
5. (Netherlands) Manon Bollegraf / (Netherlands) Tom Nijssen (first round)
6. (United States) Lisa Raymond / (United States) Rick Leach (first round)
7. (Australia) Elizabeth Smylie / (Australia) John Fitzgerald (first round)
8. (South Africa) **Elna Reinach** / (United States) **Patrick Galbraith (champions)**

== Draw ==
Key

- Q = Qualifier
- WC = Wild card
- LL = Lucky loser
- Alt = Alternate
- ITF = ITF entry
- PR = Protected ranking
- SR = Special ranking
- SE = Special exempt
- JE = Junior exempt
- JR = Junior Accelerator Programme entrant
- CO = College Accelerator Programme entrant
- NG = Next Gen Accelerator Program entrant
- w/o = Walkover
- r = Retired
- d = Defaulted

=== Final ===
Final
1	(Czech Republic) Jana Novotná (Australia) Todd Woodbridge	2	4
8	(South Africa) **Elna Reinach** (United States) **Patrick Galbraith**	**6**	**6**

=== Top half ===
First round
1	(Czech Republic) **J Novotná** (Australia) **T Woodbridge**	**6**	**6**
(Argentina) M Paz (South Africa) P Norval	3	2
(United States) **S Stafford** (United States) **S Melville**	**6**	**6**
(Australia) R Stubbs (United States) S Davis	3	3
(United States) **P Fendick** (United States) **M Bauer**	**6**	**6**
(Italy) S Cecchini (South Africa) L Bale	2	4
ALT	(Australia) **R McQuillan** (Australia) **D Macpherson**	4	**6**	**6**
7	(Australia) E Smylie (Australia) J Fitzgerald	**6**	3	4
3	(United States) **G Fernández** (Czech Republic) **C Suk**	**7**	**6**
(Argentina) P Tarabini (Netherlands) M Oosting	5	1
(Netherlands) K Boogert (South Africa) D Adams	3	**7**	4
(Australia) **K-A Guse** (The Bahamas) **M Knowles**	**6**	5	**6**
(United States) **Z Garrison-Jackson** (United States) **T Kronemann**	**7**	**6**
(United States) L Harvey-Wild (United States) B Pearce	5	0
WC	(France) **M Pierce** (United States) **M Jensen**	**6**	4	**6**
6	(United States) L Raymond (United States) R Leach	3	**6**	2

Second round
1	(Czech Republic) **J Novotná** (Australia) **T Woodbridge**	**6**	**6**
(United States) S Stafford (United States) S Melville	2	2
(United States) P Fendick (United States) M Bauer	3	6^{3}
ALT	(Australia) **R McQuillan** (Australia) **D Macpherson**	**6**	**7^{7}**
3	(United States) **G Fernández** (Czech Republic) **C Suk**	**7^{7}**	**7^{7}**
(Australia) K-A Guse (The Bahamas) M Knowles	6^{2}	6^{5}
(United States) Z Garrison-Jackson (United States) T Kronemann
WC	(France) **M Pierce** (United States) **M Jensen**	w/o

Quarterfinals
1	(Czech Republic) **J Novotná** (Australia) **T Woodbridge**	**6**	**7**
ALT	(Australia) R McQuillan (Australia) D Macpherson	3	5
3	(United States) **G Fernández** (Czech Republic) **C Suk**	**6**	**6**
WC	(France) M Pierce (United States) M Jensen	3	4

Semifinals
1	(Czech Republic) **J Novotná** (Australia) **T Woodbridge**	**7**	**6**
3	(United States) G Fernández (Czech Republic) C Suk	5	4

=== Bottom half ===
First round
5	(Netherlands) M Bollegraf (Netherlands) T Nijssen	5	4
(United States) **K Adams** (Mexico) **J Lozano**	**7**	**6**
(Canada) **J Hetherington** (South Africa) **J-L de Jager**	**6**	**6**
(Georgia (country)) L Meskhi (South Africa) D Visser	4	4
(Indonesia) Y Basuki (Belgium) L Pimek	4	3
(United States) **M J Fernández** (Australia) **S Stolle**	**6**	**6**
(Italy) L Golarsa (United States) L Jensen	2	4
4	(Latvia) **L Neiland** (Russia) **A Olhovskiy**	**6**	**6**
8	(South Africa) **E Reinach** (United States) **P Galbraith**	**6**	**6**
WC	(United States) R White (United States) S Cannon	4	4
(Ukraine) **N Medvedeva** (Netherlands) **H J Davids**	**6**	1	**7**
(United States) D Graham (United States) K Flach	3	**6**	5
WC	(Argentina) G Sabatini (Italy) M Valeri	6^{3}	2
(Japan) **N Miyagi** (United States) **K Kinnear**	**7^{7}**	**6**
(Australia) K Radford (United States) J Pugh	2	4
2	(United States) **M McGrath** (Australia) **M Woodforde**	**6**	**6**

Second round
(United States) K Adams (Mexico) J Lozano	4	**6**	4
(Canada) **J Hetherington** (South Africa) **J-L de Jager**	**6**	3	**6**
(United States) **M J Fernández** (Australia) **S Stolle**	**7**	**6**
4	(Latvia) L Neiland (Russia) A Olhovskiy	5	3
8	(South Africa) **E Reinach** (United States) **P Galbraith**	**7**	**7**
(Ukraine) N Medvedeva (Netherlands) H J Davids	5	5
(Japan) N Miyagi (United States) K Kinnear	2	3
2	(United States) **M McGrath** (Australia) **M Woodforde**	**6**	**6**

Quarterfinals
(Canada) **J Hetherington** (South Africa) **J-L de Jager**	**6**	**6**
(United States) M J Fernández (Australia) S Stolle	4	2
8	(South Africa) **E Reinach** (United States) **P Galbraith**	**6**	3	**6**
2	(United States) M McGrath (Australia) M Woodforde	4	**6**	3

Semifinals
(Canada) J Hetherington (South Africa) J-L de Jager	6^{0}	**7^{7}**	1
8	(South Africa) **E Reinach** (United States) **P Galbraith**	**7^{7}**	6^{4}	**6**
