= Caroline Kuhlman =

American tennis player

- Country (sports): United States
- Born: August 25, 1966 (age 59)
- Height: 1.73 m (5 ft 8 in)
- Turned pro: 1983
- Retired: 1995
- Plays: Right-handed (two-handed backhand)
- Prize money: US$ 308,149

Singles
- Career record: 143–97
- Career titles: 0
- Highest ranking: No. 52 (August 4, 1986)

Grand Slam singles results
- Australian Open: 3R (1994)
- French Open: 1R (1992, 1993, 1994)
- Wimbledon: 2R (1994)
- US Open: 3R (1985, 1992)

Doubles
- Career record: 40–43
- Highest ranking: No. 92 (February 1, 1993)

Grand Slam doubles results
- Wimbledon: Q2 (1986)

Caroline Kuhlman (born August 25, 1966) is an American retired tennis player.

== Tennis career ==
During her tennis career she reached one WTA Tour final and won five singles and three doubles titles on the ITF Women's Circuit. Her best WTA ranking was No. 52 (August 4, 1986).

== WTA Tour finals ==
=== Singles (1 runner-up) ===
Result	W/L	Date	Tournament	Tier	Surface	Opponent	Score
Loss	0–1	Feb 1993	Auckland, New Zealand	Tier IV	Hard	(South Africa) Elna Reinach	0–6, 0–6
