= Ginger Helgeson-Nielsen =

American tennis player (born 1968)

Ginger Helgeson
- Country (sports): United States
- Residence: Carlsbad, California, U.S.
- Born: September 14, 1968 (age 57); St. Cloud, Minnesota, U.S.
- Height: 5 ft 8 in (1.73 m)
- Turned pro: 1987
- Retired: 1998
- Plays: Right-handed (two handed backhand)
- Prize money: $724,792

Singles
- Career record: 183–144
- Career titles: 1 WTA
- Highest ranking: No. 29 (January 2, 1995)

Grand Slam singles results
- Australian Open: 4R (1994)
- French Open: 2R (1992, 1993, 1994)
- Wimbledon: 3R (1994)
- US Open: 4R (1994)

Doubles
- Career record: 98–108
- Career titles: 0 WTA, 1 ITF
- Highest ranking: No. 38 (January 9, 1995)

Grand Slam doubles results
- Australian Open: 2R (1992, 1993, 1997)
- French Open: QF (1994)
- Wimbledon: QF (1997)
- US Open: 3R (1994)

Ginger Helgeson (born September 14, 1968) is an American former professional tennis player, who is considered to be perhaps the greatest player ever to come out of Minnesota. She reached her highest singles ranking on January 2, 1995, when she became the No. 29 in the world. In doubles, she reached No. 38 in the same year, on January 9.

== Tennis career ==
Helgeson was born in St. Cloud, Minnesota, before moving to Edina after seventh grade. She was coached by her brother, Brace, throughout juniors and high school. She attended Edina High School and became a three-time consecutive Minnesota state singles champion, and was ranked No. 1 by the USTA Northern at all levels.

Helgeson then received a scholarship to attend Pepperdine University in Malibu, California. Whilst there, she was a four-year letter winner and a three-time All American, and holds the all-time best career winning percentage.

She played professionally from 1987, spending her first few years on the ITF Women's Circuit. Her best season was in 1994, winning her first WTA title in Auckland and reaching the fourth round of the Australian and U.S. Opens. At the latter event, she beat reigning Wimbledon champion Conchita Martínez for her biggest career victory. Her ranking hit the top 30 as a result of her breakthrough season. She reached the final of Auckland again in 1995, but a serious wrist injury at a tournament in Amelia Island put her out for the rest of the 1995 season. She returned in March 1996, but wasn't able to make it back into the top 100 in singles. She played her last match at the US Open qualifying tournament in 1998, where she reached the second round.

In addition to her win over Martínez, she also recorded victories over Helena Suková, Mary Joe Fernández, Gigi Fernández, Anke Huber, Lori McNeil, Sabine Appelmans, Sabine Hack and Natasha Zvereva.

In 2009, she was inducted into the USTA Northern Hall of Fame, having already been inducted into the Pepperdine Athletic Hall of Fame in 2008. Helgeson now lives in Carlsbad, California, with husband, Vasili Panos. Ginger runs her own posture alignment therapy business, “Realign Design” practicing the Egoscue Method.

== WTA career finals ==
Legend
Grand Slam tournaments
Virginia Slims
Tier I
Tier II
Tier III
Tier IV & V

=== Singles: 1 title, 1 runner-up ===
Result	W/L	Date	Tournament	Category	Surface	Opponent	Score
Win	1–0	Feb 1994	Auckland, New Zealand	Tier IV	Hard	(Argentina) Inés Gorrochategui	7–6^{(7–4)}, 6–3
Loss	1–1	Feb 1995	Auckland, New Zealand	Tier IV	Hard	(Australia) Nicole Bradtke	6–3, 2–6, 1–6

=== Doubles: 2 runner-ups ===
Result	W/L	Date	Tournament	Category	Surface	Partner	Opponents	Score
Loss	0–1	Aug 1992	Schenectady, U.S.	Tier V	Hard	(United States) Shannan McCarthy	(France) Alexia Dechaume (Argentina) Florencia Labat	3–6, 6–1, 2–6
Loss	0–2	Aug 1994	San Diego Open, U.S.	Tier II	Hard	(Australia) Rachel McQuillan	(Czech Republic) Jana Novotná (Spain) Arantxa Sánchez Vicario	3–6, 3–6

== Best Grand Slam results details ==
	Australian Open	
1994 Australian Open
Round	Opponent	Score
1R	(Germany) Veronika Martinek	6–3, 6–2
2R	(Netherlands) Kristie Boogert	6–2, 6–0
3R	(Germany) Anke Huber (7)	3–6, 7–6^{(12–10)}, 6–4
4R	(Japan) Kimiko Date (10)	5–7, 1–6

	French Open	
1992 French Open
Round	Opponent	Score
1R	(France) Sophie Amiach	6–4, 5–7, 6–4
2R	(France) Nathalie Tauziat (12)	6–3, 1–6, 3–6
1993 French Open
Round	Opponent	Score
1R	(Germany) Silke Meier	6–1, 4–6, 6–2
2R	(Spain) Conchita Martínez (4)	5–7, 2–6
1994 French Open
Round	Opponent	Score
1R	(South Africa) Elna Reinach	4–6, 6–4, 6–3
2R	(Spain) Conchita Martínez (3)	2–6, 3–6

	Wimbledon Championships	
1994 Wimbledon
Round	Opponent	Score
1R	(Germany) Veronika Martinek	6–3, 6–2
2R	(Netherlands) Claire Wegink (LL)	6–4, 6–0
3R	(South Africa) Amanda Coetzer (14)	0–6, 3–6

	US Open	
1994 US Open
Round	Opponent	Score
1R	(Germany) Karin Kschwendt	6–2, 6–1
2R	(Sweden) Åsa Carlsson	6–1, 6–1
3R	(Spain) Conchita Martínez (3)	3–6, 6–4, 6–1
4R	(United States) Gigi Fernández	3–6, 4–6
