= 1993 Ilva Trophy – Singles =

Singles
- 1993 Ilva Trophy

Final
- Champion: (Netherlands) Brenda Schultz
- Runner-up: (United States) Debbie Graham
- Score: 7–6^{(7–5)}, 6–2

Details
- Draw: 32 (2WC/4Q/1LL)
- Seeds: 8

Events
Singles	Doubles
← 1992 ·	Ilva Trophy	· 1994 →

Julie Halard was the defending champion, but lost in the first round to lucky loser Angelique Olivier.

Brenda Schultz won the title by defeating Debbie Graham 7–6^{(7–5)}, 6–2 in the final.

== Seeds ==
1. (France) Julie Halard (first round)
2. (Italy) Sandra Cecchini (quarterfinals)
3. (Slovakia) Radka Zrubáková (second round)
4. (Switzerland) Emanuela Zardo (first round)
5. (Netherlands) Brenda Schultz (champion)
6. (United States) Debbie Graham (final)
7. (Italy) Linda Ferrando (semifinals)
8. (Croatia) Nadin Ercegović (quarterfinals)

== Draw ==
=== Key ===
- Q = Qualifier
- WC = Wild card
- LL = Lucky loser
- Alt = Alternate
- SE = Special exempt
- PR = Protected ranking
- ITF = ITF entry
- JE = Junior exempt
- w/o = Walkover
- r = Retired
- d = Defaulted
- SR = Special ranking

=== Finals ===
Semifinals
7	(Italy) Linda Ferrando	7^{7}	2	4
6	(United States) Debbie Graham	6^{5}	6	6
(France) Alexandra Fusai	5	1
5	(Netherlands) Brenda Schultz	7	6

Final
6	(United States) Debbie Graham	6^{5}	2
5	(Netherlands) Brenda Schultz	7^{7}	6

=== Top half ===
First round
1	(France) J Halard	4	5
LL	(France) A Olivier	6	7
(Switzerland) C Fauche	5	6	3
(Italy) F Romano	7	3	6
(Czechoslovakia) R Bobková	6	5	7^{11}
(France) C Mothes	2	7	6^{9}
(Spain) V Ruano Pascual	5	0
7	(Italy) L Ferrando	7	6
3	(Slovakia) R Zrubáková	6	7
(Italy) F Perfetti	2	5
WC	(Italy) S Farina	6	2	7^{7}
(Austria) S Dopfer	4	6	6^{1}
(Italy) K Piccolini	2	1
Q	(Australia) K Sharpe	6	6
(Czech Republic) P Langrová	4	2
6	(United States) D Graham	6	6

Second round
LL	(France) A Olivier	4	3
(Italy) F Romano	6	6
(Czechoslovakia) R Bobková	1	3
7	(Italy) L Ferrando	6	6
3	(Slovakia) R Zrubáková	4	5
WC	(Italy) S Farina	6	7
Q	(Australia) K Sharpe	3	3
6	(United States) D Graham	6	6

Quarterfinals
(Italy) F Romano	7	3	3
7	(Italy) L Ferrando	5	6	6
WC	(Italy) S Farina	3	1
6	(United States) D Graham	6	6

Semifinals
7	(Italy) L Ferrando	7^{7}	2	4
6	(United States) D Graham	6^{5}	6	6

=== Bottom half ===
First round
8	(Croatia) N Ercegović	6	6
(United Kingdom) C Wood	3	1
(South Africa) J Kruger	3	6^{5}
(Greece) C Papadáki	6	7^{7}
(France) A Fusai	2	7^{7}	7^{7}
Q	(France) L Ghirardi	6	6^{5}	6^{5}
(Slovakia) K Habšudová	6	6
4	(Switzerland) E Zardo	3	2
5	(Netherlands) B Schultz	6	6
Q	(Italy) L Garrone	4	4
(Finland) N Dahlman	5	3
Q	(Czech Republic) K Hrdličková	7	6
(Netherlands) N Muns-Jagerman	7^{7}	6
(Argentina) M Paz	6^{4}	3
WC	(Italy) M Grossi	6	2	4
2	(Italy) S Cecchini	4	6	6

Second round
8	(Croatia) N Ercegović	7	6
(Greece) C Papadáki	5	3
(France) A Fusai	5	6	7^{7}
(Slovakia) K Habšudová	7	1	6^{5}
5	(Netherlands) B Schultz	6	1	6
Q	(Czech Republic) K Hrdličková	3	6	4
(Netherlands) N Muns-Jagerman	2	6^{3}
2	(Italy) S Cecchini	6	7^{7}

Quarterfinals
8	(Croatia) N Ercegović	5	2
(France) A Fusai	7	6
5	(Netherlands) B Schultz	6	7
2	(Italy) S Cecchini	4	5

Semifinals
(France) A Fusai	5	1
5	(Netherlands) B Schultz	7	6
