= 1992 French Open – Women's singles =

Women's singles
- 1992 French Open

Final
- Champion: (Federal Republic of Yugoslavia) Monica Seles
- Runner-up: (Germany) Steffi Graf
- Score: 6–2, 3–6, 10–8

Details
- Draw: 128
- Seeds: 16

Events
Singles	men	women		boys	girls
Doubles	men	women	mixed	boys	girls
WC Singles	men	women	quad
WC Doubles	men	women	quad
Legends	−45	45+	women
← 1991 ·	French Open	· 1993 →

Two-time defending champion Monica Seles defeated Steffi Graf in the final, 6–2, 3–6, 10–8 to win the women's singles tennis title at the 1992 French Open. It was her third French Open title and sixth major title overall, becoming the first woman in the Open Era to win three consecutive French Open titles. The final is considered by some to be the greatest French Open match in the Open Era.

== Seeds ==
1. (Federal Republic of Yugoslavia) Monica Seles (champion)
2. (Germany) Steffi Graf (final)
3. (Argentina) Gabriela Sabatini (semifinals)
4. (Spain) Arantxa Sánchez Vicario (semifinals)
5. (United States) Jennifer Capriati (quarterfinals)
6. (United States) Mary Joe Fernández (third round)
7. (Spain) Conchita Martínez (quarterfinals)
8. (Switzerland) Manuela Maleeva (third round)
9. (Germany) Anke Huber (second round)
10. (Czechoslovakia) Jana Novotná (fourth round)
11. (Bulgaria) Katerina Maleeva (second round)
12. (France) Nathalie Tauziat (fourth round)
13. (France) Mary Pierce (fourth round)
14. (Japan) Kimiko Date (fourth round)
15. (Commonwealth of Independent States) Leila Meskhi (fourth round)
16. (Belgium) Sabine Appelmans (second round)

== Draw ==
=== Key ===
- Q = Qualifier
- WC = Wild card
- LL = Lucky loser
- Alt = Alternate
- ITF = ITF entry
- PR = Protected ranking
- SR = Special ranking
- SE = Special exempt
- JE = Junior exempt
- JR = Junior Accelerator Programme entrant
- CO = College Accelerator Programme entrant
- NG = Next Gen Accelerator Program entrant
- w/o = Walkover
- r = Retired
- d = Defaulted

=== Finals ===
Quarterfinals
1	(Federal Republic of Yugoslavia) Monica Seles	6	6
5	(United States) Jennifer Capriati	2	2
3	(Argentina) Gabriela Sabatini	3	6	6
7	(Spain) Conchita Martínez	6	3	2
(Netherlands) Manon Bollegraf	2	3
4	(Spain) Arantxa Sánchez Vicario	6	6
(Commonwealth of Independent States) Natasha Zvereva	3	7^{7}	3
2	(Germany) Steffi Graf	6	6^{4}	6

Semifinals
1	(Federal Republic of Yugoslavia) Monica Seles	6	4	6
3	(Argentina) Gabriela Sabatini	3	6	4
4	(Spain) Arantxa Sánchez Vicario	6	2	2
2	(Germany) Steffi Graf	0	6	6

Final
1	(Federal Republic of Yugoslavia) Monica Seles	6	3	10
2	(Germany) Steffi Graf	2	6	8

=== Top half ===
==== Section 1 ====
First round
1	(Federal Republic of Yugoslavia) M Seles	6	6
(France) C Mothes-Jobkel	1	0
(Netherlands) S Rottier	4	3
Q	(Germany) K Kschwendt	6	6
(United States) C Kuhlman	2	2
(United States) L McNeil	6	6
(United States) L Harvey-Wild	6	6
(Australia) R Stubbs	4	2
(South Africa) E Reinach	6^{3}	6	7
(Japan) A Kijimuta	7^{7}	4	9
WC	(France) A Fusai	1	0
(Argentina) C Tessi	6	6
(United Kingdom) J Durie	7^{7}	6
(Finland) N Dahlman	6^{5}	2
(Czechoslovakia) R Zrubáková	2	2
9	(Germany) A Huber	6	6

Second round
1	(Federal Republic of Yugoslavia) M Seles	6	6
Q	(Germany) K Kschwendt	2	2
(United States) L McNeil	6	6
(United States) L Harvey-Wild	2	3
(Japan) A Kijimuta	7^{7}	3	8
(Argentina) C Tessi	6^{3}	6	6
(United Kingdom) J Durie	6	7
9	(Germany) A Huber	1	5

Third round
1	(Federal Republic of Yugoslavia) M Seles	6	6
(United States) L McNeil	0	1
(Japan) A Kijimuta	6^{5}	6	6
(United Kingdom) J Durie	7^{7}	4	4

Fourth round
1	(Federal Republic of Yugoslavia) M Seles	6	3	6
(Japan) A Kijimuta	1	6	4

==== Section 2 ====
First round
13	(France) M Pierce	6	6
(Czechoslovakia) R Rajchrtová	1	1
(Latvia) L Savchenko-Neiland	6	6
WC	(France) B Collet	4	0
(United States) M Werdel	6	2	4
(Czechoslovakia) A Strnadová	0	6	6
(Japan) M Kidowaki	6	6
(United States) A Keller	1	2
(Czechoslovakia) K Habšudová	3	6	6
(Germany) C Porwik	6	3	1
(United States) K Adams	6	4	3
(France) N van Lottum	4	6	6
(France) S Testud	6	6
(Netherlands) N Krijger-Jagerman	3	1
Q	(Austria) B Reinstadler	1	7^{7}	2
5	(United States) J Capriati	6	6^{3}	6

Second round
13	(France) M Pierce	6	6
(Latvia) L Savchenko-Neiland	2	3
(Czechoslovakia) A Strnadová	6	6
(Japan) M Kidowaki	4	3
(Czechoslovakia) K Habšudová	7	6
(France) N van Lottum	5	1
(France) S Testud	4	4
5	(United States) J Capriati	6	6

Third round
13	(France) M Pierce	7^{7}	6
(Czechoslovakia) A Strnadová	6^{1}	4
(Czechoslovakia) K Habšudová	6	4	3
5	(United States) J Capriati	4	6	6

Fourth round
13	(France) M Pierce	4	3
5	(United States) J Capriati	6	6

==== Section 3 ====
First round
3	(Argentina) G Sabatini	6	6
(Italy) S Farina	0	0
(United Kingdom) M Javer	1	1
(Italy) A-M Cecchini	6	6
(Argentina) B Fulco-Villella	2	4
(France) J Halard	6	6
(South Africa) R Fairbank-Nideffer	3	6	6
(United States) K Po	6	4	2
Q	(Romania) I Spîrlea	2	6	1^{r}
(Canada) P Hy	6	4	2
(Sweden) C Lindqvist	5	4
(United Kingdom) S Gomer	7	6
(Commonwealth of Independent States) E Brioukhovets	6	6
Q	(Netherlands) K Boogert	1	2
(France) P Paradis-Mangon	1	0
11	(Bulgaria) K Maleeva	6	6

Second round
3	(Argentina) G Sabatini	6	6
(Italy) A-M Cecchini	0	1
(France) J Halard	6	6
(South Africa) R Fairbank-Nideffer	2	2
(Canada) P Hy	7^{7}	6
(United Kingdom) S Gomer	6^{5}	0
(Commonwealth of Independent States) E Brioukhovets	4	6	6
11	(Bulgaria) K Maleeva	6	4	1

Third round
3	(Argentina) G Sabatini	6	6
(France) J Halard	1	3
(Canada) P Hy	6	7
(Commonwealth of Independent States) E Brioukhovets	0	5

Fourth round
3	(Argentina) G Sabatini	6	6
(Canada) P Hy	3	1

==== Section 4 ====
First round
15	(Commonwealth of Independent States) L Meskhi	6	6
(Italy) L Garrone	1	3
(Italy) F Bonsignori	6	6
(France) N Herreman	3	4
(France) S Niox-Château	5	5
(United States) B Bowes	7	7
(Italy) L Ferrando	6	6
(Italy) R Reggi-Concato	1	3
(United States) P Fendick	3	3
(United States) A Grossman	6	6
(Poland) K Nowak	5	0
(Germany) W Probst	7	6
(Czechoslovakia) E Švíglerová	2	1
(Germany) V Martinek	6	6
(Peru) L Gildemeister	2	6^{2}
7	(Spain) C Martínez	6	7^{7}

Second round
15	(Commonwealth of Independent States) L Meskhi	6	6
(Italy) F Bonsignori	1	1
(United States) B Bowes	4	4
(Italy) L Ferrando	6	6
(United States) A Grossman	6	6
(Germany) W Probst	3	0
(Germany) V Martinek	2	0
7	(Spain) C Martínez	6	6

Third round
15	(Commonwealth of Independent States) L Meskhi	1	7^{10}	6
(Italy) L Ferrando	6	6^{8}	4
(United States) A Grossman	2	2
7	(Spain) C Martínez	6	6

Fourth round
15	(Commonwealth of Independent States) L Meskhi	4	5
7	(Spain) C Martínez	6	7

=== Bottom half ===
==== Section 5 ====
First round
8	(Switzerland) Man Maleeva	6	7^{7}
(United States) H Cioffi	4	6^{1}
LL	(Czechoslovakia) D Szabová	3	3
(Germany) B Rittner	6	6
(Netherlands) M Bollegraf	6	6
(Commonwealth of Independent States) E Maniokova	2	3
Q	(Argentina) ML Reynares	4	6	6
(Finland) P Thorén	6	4	8
Q	(Belgium) S Wasserman	7	6
(Japan) R Hiraki	5	3
(United States) C Cunningham	2	6	3
(United States) D Faber	6	0	6
WC	(France) S Amiach	4	7	4
(United States) G Helgeson	6	5	6
(Argentina) I Gorrochategui	5	1
12	(France) N Tauziat	7	6

Second round
8	(Switzerland) Man Maleeva	5	6	6
(Germany) B Rittner	7	1	2
(Netherlands) M Bollegraf	6	4	7
(Finland) P Thorén	2	6	5
Q	(Belgium) S Wasserman	7	6
(United States) D Faber	5	4
(United States) G Helgeson	6	1	3
12	(France) N Tauziat	3	6	6

Third round
8	(Switzerland) Man Maleeva	5	2
(Netherlands) M Bollegraf	7	6
Q	(Belgium) S Wasserman	4	2
12	(France) N Tauziat	6	6

Fourth round
(Netherlands) M Bollegraf	6	1	6
12	(France) N Tauziat	4	6	2

==== Section 6 ====
First round
14	(Japan) K Date	6	6^{1}	6
(Japan) N Sawamatsu	2	7^{7}	3
WC	(France) A Olivier	3	3
(Germany) S Meier	6	6
(Italy) K Piccolini	3	7^{7}	6
(Australia) J Byrne	6	6^{5}	2
(France) I Demongeot	1	2
(Japan) M Endo	6	6
(Germany) S Frankl	6	6
WC	(France) C Suire	4	3
(Argentina) F Labat	2	3
(Austria) J Wiesner	6	6
(Switzerland) E Zardo	6	6
(China) Li F	1	2
(Germany) K Oeljeklaus	0	2
4	(Spain) A Sánchez Vicario	6	6

Second round
14	(Japan) K Date	4	6	6
(Germany) S Meier	6	4	3
(Italy) K Piccolini	6^{4}	0
(Japan) M Endo	7^{7}	6
(Germany) S Frankl	3	2
(Austria) J Wiesner	6	6
(Switzerland) E Zardo	3	2
4	(Spain) A Sánchez Vicario	6	6

Third round
14	(Japan) K Date	6	6
(Japan) M Endo	3	2
(Austria) J Wiesner	3	1
4	(Spain) A Sánchez Vicario	6	6

Fourth round
14	(Japan) K Date	1	2
4	(Spain) A Sánchez Vicario	6	6

==== Section 7 ====
First round
6	(United States) MJ Fernandez	6	6
LL	(Czechoslovakia) P Langrová	3	1
Q	(United States) S Stafford	6	2	6
(United States) K Rinaldi	3	6	3
(Argentina) P Tarabini	3	0
(Germany) S Hack	6	6
(South Africa) M de Swardt	6	6
WC	(France) A Zugasti	2	4
(Bulgaria) Mag Maleeva	6	6
(Australia) N Provis	2	3
(United States) L Allen	5	6	6
(Belgium) D Monami	7	4	3
(Commonwealth of Independent States) N Zvereva	6	6
(Germany) C Kohde-Kilsch	2	3
(United States) T Whitlinger	4	3
16	(Belgium) S Appelmans	6	6

Second round
6	(United States) MJ Fernandez	6	6
Q	(United States) S Stafford	1	4
(Germany) S Hack	0	6	6
(South Africa) M de Swardt	6	4	4
(Bulgaria) Mag Maleeva	4	7^{7}	6
(United States) L Allen	6	6^{2}	1
(Commonwealth of Independent States) N Zvereva	6	7^{7}
16	(Belgium) S Appelmans	1	6^{1}

Third round
6	(United States) MJ Fernandez	6^{1}	2
(Germany) S Hack	7^{7}	6
(Bulgaria) Mag Maleeva	4	4
(Commonwealth of Independent States) N Zvereva	6	6

Fourth round
(Germany) S Hack	3	3
(Commonwealth of Independent States) N Zvereva	6	6

==== Section 8 ====
First round
10	(Czechoslovakia) J Novotná	6	6
(United States) D Graham	3	2
(Commonwealth of Independent States) N Medvedeva	6	6
(Germany) M Babel	4	4
(United States) C Rubin	2	7	4
(Netherlands) B Schultz	6	5	6
(Argentina) M Paz	2	6	4
(United States) A Frazier	6	3	6
Q	(Austria) S Dopfer	7^{7}	1	6
WC	(France) N Guerrée	6^{3}	6	3
(South Africa) A Coetzer	6	3	6
(France) A Dechaume	4	6	3
WC	(France) N Housset	4	6	9
(Chinese Taipei) Wang S-t	6	4	7
(Canada) R Simpson-Alter	3	1
2	(Germany) S Graf	6	6

Second round
10	(Czechoslovakia) J Novotná	6	6
(Commonwealth of Independent States) N Medvedeva	4	1
(Netherlands) B Schultz	6	3	6
(United States) A Frazier	1	6	2
Q	(Austria) S Dopfer	6^{3}	6	3
(South Africa) A Coetzer	7^{7}	4	6
WC	(France) N Housset	2	1
2	(Germany) S Graf	6	6

Third round
10	(Czechoslovakia) J Novotná	6	6
(Netherlands) B Schultz	3	4
(South Africa) A Coetzer	2	1
2	(Germany) S Graf	6	6

Fourth round
10	(Czechoslovakia) J Novotná	1	4
2	(Germany) S Graf	6	6

Preceded by 1992 Australian Open – Women's singles	Grand Slam women's singles	Succeeded by 1992 Wimbledon Championships – Women's singles
