= 1991 French Open – Women's singles =

Women's singles
- 1991 French Open

Final
- Champion: (Socialist Federal Republic of Yugoslavia) Monica Seles
- Runner-up: (Spain) Arantxa Sánchez Vicario
- Score: 6–3, 6–4

Details
- Draw: 128
- Seeds: 16

Events
Singles	men	women		boys	girls
Doubles	men	women	mixed	boys	girls
WC Singles	men	women	quad
WC Doubles	men	women	quad
Legends	−45	45+	women
← 1990 ·	French Open	· 1992 →

Defending champion Monica Seles defeated Arantxa Sánchez Vicario in the final, 6–3, 6–4 to win the women's singles title at the 1991 French Open. It was her second French Open title and third major title overall.

This tournament marked the most decisive defeat suffered by Steffi Graf at a major: she won just two games in the semifinals against Sánchez Vicario (a rematch of the 1989 final). It was also the first time since the 1987 Wimbledon Championships that Graf was not the top seed at a major.

== Seeds ==
The seeded players are listed below. Monica Seles is the champion; others show the round in which they were eliminated.

1. (Socialist Federal Republic of Yugoslavia) Monica Seles (champion)
2. (Germany) Steffi Graf (semifinals)
3. (Argentina) Gabriela Sabatini (semifinals)
4. (United States) Mary Joe Fernández (quarterfinals)
5. (Spain) Arantxa Sánchez Vicario (finalist)
6. (Czechoslovakia) Jana Novotná (quarterfinals)
7. (Spain) Conchita Martínez (quarterfinals)
8. (United States) Zina Garrison (first round)
9. (Switzerland) Manuela Maleeva (second round)
10. (United States) Jennifer Capriati (fourth round)
11. (Bulgaria) Katerina Maleeva (third round)
12. (Czechoslovakia) Helena Suková (second round)
13. (France) Nathalie Tauziat (quarterfinals)
14. (Soviet Union) Leila Meskhi (fourth round)
15. (Soviet Union) Natasha Zvereva (second round)
16. (Germany) Anke Huber (third round)

== Draw ==
=== Key ===
- Q = Qualifier
- WC = Wild card
- LL = Lucky loser
- r = Retired

=== Finals ===
Quarterfinals
1	(Socialist Federal Republic of Yugoslavia) Monica Seles	6	7
7	(Spain) Conchita Martínez	0	5
3	(Argentina) Gabriela Sabatini	5	7^{12}	6
6	(Czechoslovakia) Jana Novotná	7	6^{10}	0
5	(Spain) Arantxa Sánchez Vicario	6	6
4	(United States) Mary Joe Fernández	3	2
13	(France) Nathalie Tauziat	3	2
2	(Germany) Steffi Graf	6	6

Semifinals
1	(Socialist Federal Republic of Yugoslavia) Monica Seles	6	6
3	(Argentina) Gabriela Sabatini	4	1
5	(Spain) Arantxa Sánchez Vicario	6	6
2	(Germany) Steffi Graf	0	2

Finals
1	(Socialist Federal Republic of Yugoslavia) Monica Seles	6	6
5	(Spain) Arantxa Sánchez Vicario	3	4

=== Earlier rounds ===
==== Section 1 ====
First round
1	(Socialist Federal Republic of Yugoslavia) Seles	6	6
(Czechoslovakia) Zrubáková	3	0
(South Africa) de Swardt	6^{2}	7^{7}	6
WC	(France) Fusai	7^{7}	6^{5}	1
(United States) Fendick	6	6
(Greece) Kanellopoulou	4	2
(France) Quentrec	7^{9}	7^{8}
(United States) Helgeson	6^{7}	6^{6}
(Italy) Cecchini	6	3	7
(Germany) Cueto	3	6	5
WC	(France) Suire	6	6
(France) Paradis	2	3
(Italy) Bonsignori	6	6
(France) Herreman	3	4
16	(Germany) Huber	6	6
(Italy) Garrone	2	3

Second round
1	(Socialist Federal Republic of Yugoslavia) Seles	6	6
(South Africa) de Swardt	0	2
(United States) Fendick	1	6	3
(France) Quentrec	6	4	6
(Italy) Cecchini	6	6
WC	(France) Suire	2	2
(Italy) Bonsignori	0	2
16	(Germany) Huber	6	6

Third round
1	(Socialist Federal Republic of Yugoslavia) Seles	6	6
(France) Quentrec	1	2
(Italy) Cecchini	6	6
16	(Germany) Huber	3	4

Fourth round
1	(Socialist Federal Republic of Yugoslavia) Seles	3	6	6
(Italy) Cecchini	6	3	0

==== Section 2 ====
First round
10	(United States) Capriati	6	7
(Italy) Piccolini	2	5
(Hungary) Temesvári	6	6
(Japan) Miyagi	1	3
WC	(France) van Lottum	6	2	6
(Bulgaria) Pampoulova	4	6	3
(Japan) Kidowaki	6	6
(Netherlands) Schultz	4	4
(United States) Cunningham	6	6
(United States) Martin	2	2
(France) Halard	6	7
(Czechoslovakia) Habšudová	4	5
(United States) Rehe	7	6
(Indonesia) Basuki	5	3
7	(Spain) Martínez	6	6
(Austria) Wiesner	4	3

Second round
10	(United States) Capriati	6	6
(Hungary) Temesvári	2	1
WC	(France) van Lottum	3	7	6
(Japan) Kidowaki	6	5	8
(United States) Cunningham	6	7
(France) Halard	2	5
(United States) Rehe	1	6^{3}
7	(Spain) Martínez	6	7^{7}

Third round
10	(United States) Capriati	6	6
(Japan) Kidowaki	3	0
(United States) Cunningham	1	4
7	(Spain) Martínez	6	6

Fourth round
10	(United States) Capriati	3	3
7	(Spain) Martínez	6	6

==== Section 3 ====
First round
3	(Argentina) Sabatini	6	6
(United States) Werdel	1	1
(Switzerland) Zardo	6	6
(Argentina) Paz	3	2
(Germany) Martinek	6	6
(Germany) Porwik	1	0
(France) Pierce	7^{7}	6
(Sweden) Dahlman	6^{1}	0
(United States) Fernández	7^{7}	6
(Japan) Takagi	6^{4}	2
(Australia) McQuillan	6	7
(Hungary) Bartos	3	5
(Canada) Kelesi	6	6
(Germany) Rittner	0	2
12	(Czechoslovakia) Suková	6	6
(Czechoslovakia) Švíglerová	0	1

Second round
3	(Argentina) Sabatini	6	6
(Switzerland) Zardo	1	1
(Germany) Martinek	3	0
(France) Pierce	6	6
(United States) Fernández	2	2
(Australia) McQuillan	6	6
(Canada) Kelesi	4	7	6
12	(Czechoslovakia) Suková	6	5	0

Third round
3	(Argentina) Sabatini	6	6
(France) Pierce	2	1
(Australia) McQuillan	6	2	6
(Canada) Kelesi	4	6	4

Fourth round
3	(Argentina) Sabatini	6	6
(Australia) McQuillan	3	0

==== Section 4 ====
First round
14	(Soviet Union) Meskhi	6	6
LL	(Austria) Dopfer	2	2
(Germany) Kohde-Kilsch	6	6
(United Kingdom) Loosemore	1	3
(United States) Harvey-Wild	6	7
Q	(Italy) Baudone	4	5
(Peru) Gildemeister	6	2	6
(United Kingdom) Smith	3	6	1
(Switzerland) Caverzasio	6	6
(United States) Keller	4	3
(Soviet Union) Brioukhovets	1	6	7
(France) Dechaume	6	2	5
(Canada) Hy	6	6
(France) Mothes-Jobkel	2	2
6	(Czechoslovakia) Novotná	7	6
LL	(Italy) Farina	5	2

Second round
14	(Soviet Union) Meskhi	7	6
(Germany) Kohde-Kilsch	5	1
(United States) Harvey-Wild	7^{9}	6^{7}	11
(Peru) Gildemeister	6^{7}	7^{9}	9
(Switzerland) Caverzasio	2	2
(Soviet Union) Brioukhovets	6	6
(Canada) Hy	2	1
6	(Czechoslovakia) Novotná	6	6

Third round
14	(Soviet Union) Meskhi	6	6
(United States) Harvey-Wild	3	1
(Soviet Union) Brioukhovets	6^{6}	2
6	(Czechoslovakia) Novotná	7^{8}	6

Fourth round
14	(Soviet Union) Meskhi	0	6^{7}
6	(Czechoslovakia) Novotná	6	7^{9}

==== Section 5 ====
First round
5	(Spain) Sánchez Vicario	6	6
(United States) McNeil	2	2
(Australia) Godridge	6	4	6
(United States) McGrath	4	6	3
Q	(Argentina) Fulco	6	6
(Australia) Smylie	4	0
(Argentina) Tessi	6	6
(United Kingdom) Wood	4	1
(United States) Rinaldi	6	6
Q	(Czechoslovakia) Lásková	2	3
(United States) Whitlinger	6	7^{9}
(United States) deLone	1	6^{7}
(United States) Grossman	7	6
(Italy) Golarsa	5	0
15	(Soviet Union) Zvereva	6	6
(United States) Faber	0	0

Second round
5	(Spain) Sánchez Vicario	6	6
(Australia) Godridge	1	2
Q	(Argentina) Fulco	6	6
(Argentina) Tessi	2	2
(United States) Rinaldi	4	0
(United States) Whitlinger	6	6
(United States) Grossman	4	6	6
15	(Soviet Union) Zvereva	6	1	4

Third round
5	(Spain) Sánchez Vicario	6	6
Q	(Argentina) Fulco	1	1
(United States) Whitlinger	7^{9}	6
(United States) Grossman	6^{7}	4

Fourth round
5	(Spain) Sánchez Vicario	6	6
(United States) Whitlinger	2	1

==== Section 6 ====
First round
11	(Bulgaria) K Maleeva	6	6
Q	(Australia) Jaggard	3	4
(Japan) Kijimuta	6	6
(Sweden) Strandlund	0	4
(South Africa) Reinach	6	6
(Netherlands) Bollegraf	0	2
(United States) Cioffi	7	4	6
(Italy) Ferrando	5	6	0
Q	(Finland) Thorén	6	6
(United Kingdom) Javer	2	2
(Soviet Union) Savchenko	6	6
WC	(France) Housset	1	4
(Germany) Hack	6	7
(United Kingdom) Durie	4	5
4	(United States) Fernández	6	6
(Italy) Romano	3	0

Second round
11	(Bulgaria) K Maleeva	6	6
(Japan) Kijimuta	2	3
(South Africa) Reinach	6	6
(United States) Cioffi	3	1
Q	(Finland) Thorén	6	3	7
(Soviet Union) Savchenko	3	6	5
(Germany) Hack	4	0
4	(United States) Fernández	6	6

Third round
11	(Bulgaria) K Maleeva	4	4
(South Africa) Reinach	6	6
Q	(Finland) Thorén	4	3
4	(United States) Fernández	6	6

Fourth round
(South Africa) Reinach	4	6^{2}
4	(United States) Fernández	6	7^{7}

==== Section 7 ====
First round
(Japan) Sawamatsu	6	6
8	(United States) Garrison	4	0
(United States) Baranski	3	6	6
WC	(France) Laval	6	4	3
WC	(France) Niox-Château	6	6
(France) Demongeot	4	4
(United States) Graham	6	7
(Austria) Reinstadler	1	5
(Netherlands) Jagerman	6	6
(Czechoslovakia) Strnadová	2	4
(Australia) Provis	4	7^{9}	6
(Japan) Hiraki	6	6^{7}	2
WC	(France) Guerrée	6	7^{13}
(United Kingdom) Gomer	3	6^{11}
13	(France) Tauziat	6	6
WC	(France) Etchemendy	3	1

Second round
(Japan) Sawamatsu	6	7^{7}
(United States) Baranski	0	6^{3}
WC	(France) Niox-Château	4	0
(United States) Graham	6	6
(Netherlands) Jagerman	6	5	6
(Australia) Provis	4	7	3
WC	(France) Guerrée	2	1
13	(France) Tauziat	6	6

Third round
(Japan) Sawamatsu	5	6	6
(United States) Graham	7	2	4
(Netherlands) Jagerman	4	0
13	(France) Tauziat	6	6

Fourth round
(Japan) Sawamatsu	5	6	10
13	(France) Tauziat	7	2	12

==== Section 8 ====
First round
9	(Switzerland) Man. Maleeva	6	6
Q	(Finland) Dahlman	2	2
(Czechoslovakia) Rajchrtová	6	6
(Germany) Probst	4	3
(South Africa) Coetzer	5	7	6
(Australia) Minter	7	5	3
(Belgium) Appelmans	6	3	7
Q	(United States) Bowes	1	6	5
(United States) Stafford	6	6
(France) Tanvier	2	1
(Argentina) Labat	1	7	6
Q	(Netherlands) Rottier	6	5	1
(Czechoslovakia) Langrová	6	0	9
(France) Testud	2	6	7
(Bulgaria) Mag. Maleeva	3	6^{6}
2	(Germany) Graf	6	7^{8}

Second round
9	(Switzerland) Man. Maleeva	4	0
(Czechoslovakia) Rajchrtová	6	6
(South Africa) Coetzer	3	7	1
(Belgium) Appelmans	6	5	6
(United States) Stafford	6	7
(Argentina) Labat	3	5
(Czechoslovakia) Langrová	0	1
2	(Germany) Graf	6	6

Third round
(Czechoslovakia) Rajchrtová	2	0
(Belgium) Appelmans	6	6
(United States) Stafford	0	1
2	(Germany) Graf	6	6

Fourth round
(Belgium) Appelmans	2	2
2	(Germany) Graf	6	6
