= 1993 French Open – Women's singles =

Women's singles
- 1993 French Open

Final
- Champion: (Germany) Steffi Graf
- Runner-up: (United States) Mary Joe Fernández
- Score: 4–6, 6–2, 6–4

Details
- Draw: 128
- Seeds: 16

Events
Singles	men	women		boys	girls
Doubles	men	women	mixed	boys	girls
WC Singles	men	women	quad
WC Doubles	men	women	quad
Legends	−45	45+	women
- French Open

Steffi Graf defeated Mary Joe Fernández in the final, 4–6, 6–2, 6–4 to win the women's singles tennis title at the 1993 French Open. It was her third French Open singles title and twelfth major singles title overall, and the first leg of an eventual non-calendar-year Grand Slam. With the win, Graf recaptured the world No. 1 ranking. It was Fernández's third and last appearance in a major singles final.

Monica Seles was the three-time reigning champion, but was unable to compete due to being stabbed the previous month.

This remains, as of May 2026, the latest Grand Slam, in either the men’s or women’s game, where all top eight seeds advanced to the quarterfinals.

== Seeds ==
1. (Germany) Steffi Graf (champion)
2. (Spain) Arantxa Sánchez Vicario (semifinals)
3. (Argentina) Gabriela Sabatini (quarterfinals)
4. (Spain) Conchita Martínez (quarterfinals)
5. (United States) Mary Joe Fernández (final)
6. (United States) Jennifer Capriati (quarterfinals)
7. (Czech Republic) Jana Novotná (quarterfinals)
8. (Germany) Anke Huber (semifinals)
9. (Bulgaria) Magdalena Maleeva (fourth round)
10. (Switzerland) Manuela Maleeva (third round)
11. (South Africa) Amanda Coetzer (second round)
12. (France) Mary Pierce (fourth round)
13. (France) Nathalie Tauziat (third round)
14. (Bulgaria) Katerina Maleeva (fourth round)
15. (Germany) Sabine Hack (third round)
16. (Japan) Kimiko Date (second round)

== Draw ==
Key

- Q = Qualifier
- WC = Wild card
- LL = Lucky loser
- Alt = Alternate
- ITF = ITF entry
- PR = Protected ranking
- SR = Special ranking
- SE = Special exempt
- JE = Junior exempt
- JR = Junior Accelerator Programme entrant
- CO = College Accelerator Programme entrant
- NG = Next Gen Accelerator Program entrant
- w/o = Walkover
- r = Retired
- d = Defaulted

=== Finals ===
Quarterfinals
1	(Germany) Steffi Graf	6	7
6	(United States) Jennifer Capriati	3	5
4	(Spain) Conchita Martínez	7^{7}	4	4
8	(Germany) Anke Huber	6^{2}	6	6
5	(United States) Mary Joe Fernández	1	7^{7}	10
3	(Argentina) Gabriela Sabatini	6	6^{4}	8
7	(Czech Republic) Jana Novotná	2	5
2	(Spain) Arantxa Sánchez Vicario	6	7

Semifinals
1	(Germany) Steffi Graf	6	6
8	(Germany) Anke Huber	1	1
5	(United States) Mary Joe Fernández	6	6
2	(Spain) Arantxa Sánchez Vicario	2	2

Final
1	(Germany) Steffi Graf	4	6	6
5	(United States) Mary Joe Fernández	6	2	4

=== Top half ===
==== Section 1 ====
First round
1	(Germany) S Graf	7^{7}	6
(Sweden) C Dahlman	6^{4}	1
(Mexico) A Gavaldón	1	3
(Czech Republic) A Strnadová	6	6
(Peru) L Gildemeister	7^{7}	3	7
(United States) G Fernández	6^{5}	6	5
(Italy) K Piccolini	2	6^{4}
(Belgium) S Wasserman	6	7^{7}
(Croatia) I Majoli	6	6
Q	(Austria) S Dopfer	2	4
(Italy) F Perfetti	1	3
(United States) L Allen	6	6
(Italy) L Ferrando	6	6
(South Africa) J Kruger	0	3
(Netherlands) S Rottier	3	4
15	(Germany) S Hack	6	6

Second round
1	(Germany) S Graf	6	6
(Czech Republic) A Strnadová	1	1
(Peru) L Gildemeister	6	6
(Belgium) S Wasserman	2	3
(Croatia) I Majoli	6	6
(United States) L Allen	0	1
(Italy) L Ferrando	1	4
15	(Germany) S Hack	6	6

Third round
1	(Germany) S Graf	6	6
(Peru) L Gildemeister	2	2
(Croatia) I Majoli	6	7^{7}
15	(Germany) S Hack	0	6^{5}

Fourth round
1	(Germany) S Graf	6	7^{7}
(Croatia) I Majoli	4	6^{3}

==== Section 2 ====
First round
12	(France) M Pierce	6	6
(France) C Mothes-Jobkel	0	0
(Germany) M Babel	0	3
(Australia) R McQuillan	6	6
(United States) K Po	6	6
(Italy) F Romano	3	2
(United States) S Stafford	7^{8}	1	6
(Hungary) A Temesvári	6^{6}	6	4
(Argentina) F Labat	6	6
(Belgium) D Monami	4	0
(Germany) C Singer	4	3
(South Africa) E Reinach	6	6
(France) A Fusai	6^{3}	6	6
(France) N van Lottum	7^{7}	2	4
WC	(France) N Herreman	0	1
6	(United States) J Capriati	6	6

Second round
12	(France) M Pierce	6	6
(Australia) R McQuillan	4	0
(United States) K Po	6	6^{4}	6
(United States) S Stafford	4	7^{7}	1
(Argentina) F Labat	6	6
(South Africa) E Reinach	2	3
(France) A Fusai	1	5
6	(United States) J Capriati	6	7

Third round
12	(France) M Pierce	6^{4}	6	6
(United States) K Po	7^{7}	3	3
(Argentina) F Labat	0	6	4
6	(United States) J Capriati	6	3	6

Fourth round
12	(France) M Pierce	4	6^{6}
6	(United States) J Capriati	6	7^{8}

==== Section 3 ====
First round
4	(Spain) C Martínez	7	3	6
WC	(France) L Ghirardi	5	6	4
(Germany) S Meier	1	6	2
(United States) G Helgeson	6	4	6
(Italy) N Baudone	6	6
(Japan) M Miyauchi	1	3
(Netherlands) M Bollegraf	4	3
(United States) L Harvey-Wild	6	6
(United States) J Santrock	6	6
(Italy) G Pizzichini	4	4
(Austria) J Wiesner	6	6
(United States) L Davenport	3	1
Q	(United States) D Faber	4	3
(Netherlands) K Boogert	6	6
Q	(Italy) M Grossi	4	7	1
13	(France) N Tauziat	6	5	6

Second round
4	(Spain) C Martínez	7	6
(United States) G Helgeson	5	2
(Italy) N Baudone	4	7^{7}	6
(United States) L Harvey-Wild	6	6^{5}	4
(United States) J Santrock	1	3
(Austria) J Wiesner	6	6
(Netherlands) K Boogert	3	6	4
13	(France) N Tauziat	6	1	6

Third round
4	(Spain) C Martínez	6	7
(Italy) N Baudone	0	5
(Austria) J Wiesner	6	7^{7}
13	(France) N Tauziat	3	6^{5}

Fourth round
4	(Spain) C Martínez	6	6
(Austria) J Wiesner	3	3

==== Section 4 ====
First round
9	(Bulgaria) Mag Maleeva	6	6
Q	(Argentina) M Paz	2	2
(Argentina) I Gorrochategui	6	6
(United States) Z Garrison-Jackson	2	1
(Canada) R Simpson-Alter	0	1
(France) J Halard	6	6
(Australia) N Provis	3	5
Q	(Argentina) MJ Gaidano	6	7
WC	(France) C Lucarelli	3	2
(Hungary) A-M Földényi	6	6
(Canada) P Hy	6	7^{7}
WC	(France) S Amiach	3	6^{5}
(United States) L McNeil	6	4	6
(Argentina) B Fulco-Villella	0	6	2
(France) S Pitkowski	6^{5}	3
8	(Germany) A Huber	7^{7}	6

Second round
9	(Bulgaria) Mag Maleeva	6	6
(Argentina) I Gorrochategui	4	1
(France) J Halard	6	6
Q	(Argentina) MJ Gaidano	1	4
(Hungary) A-M Földényi	6^{9}	1
(Canada) P Hy	7^{11}	6
(United States) L McNeil	1	6	5
8	(Germany) A Huber	6	3	7

Third round
9	(Bulgaria) Mag Maleeva	6	6
(France) J Halard	4	1
(Canada) P Hy	1	2
8	(Germany) A Huber	6	6

Fourth round
9	(Bulgaria) Mag Maleeva	2	6	6
8	(Germany) A Huber	6	4	8

=== Bottom half ===
==== Section 5 ====
First round
5	(United States) MJ Fernández	6	6
(Belgium) N Feber	2	3
(United States) P Fendick	6	3	0
(United States) A Grossman	2	6	6
(United States) K Rinaldi	2	7	6
(France) S Testud	6	5	2
Q	(Austria) P Ritter	6	7^{7}
(Czech Republic) P Langrová	3	6^{5}
(Japan) R Hiraki	4	7^{7}	2
(Netherlands) M Oremans	6	6^{5}	6
(Netherlands) B Schultz	6	6
(United States) C Cunningham	1	3
WC	(France) A Olivier	3	3
(Australia) J Byrne	6	6
(France) I Demongeot	1	2
10	(Switzerland) Man Maleeva	6	6

Second round
5	(United States) MJ Fernández	6	3	6
(United States) A Grossman	3	6	1
(United States) K Rinaldi	5	6	6
Q	(Austria) P Ritter	7	4	2
(Netherlands) M Oremans	4	3
(Netherlands) B Schultz	6	6
(Australia) J Byrne	3	2
10	(Switzerland) Man Maleeva	6	6

Third round
5	(United States) MJ Fernández	6	6
(United States) K Rinaldi	2	2
(Netherlands) B Schultz	4	7	6
10	(Switzerland) Man Maleeva	6	5	4

Fourth round
5	(United States) MJ Fernández	2	7	6
(Netherlands) B Schultz	6	5	3

==== Section 6 ====
First round
14	(Bulgaria) K Maleeva	6	6
(Canada) H Kelesi	2	3
(Argentina) P Tarabini	4	6	6
Q	(Italy) L Garrone	6	3	1
(South Africa) R Nideffer	4	6	6
(Germany) V Martinek	6	4	4
(Belgium) S Appelmans	7	6
(Switzerland) E Zardo	5	2
(Germany) B Rittner	6	6
(Croatia) N Ercegović	4	4
(Japan) K Nagatsuka	2	7	7
(Belarus) T Ignatieva	6	5	5
WC	(France) K Quentrec	2	6	6
(United States) M Werdel	6	4	3
(Slovakia) R Zrubáková	0	0
3	(Argentina) G Sabatini	6	6

Second round
14	(Bulgaria) K Maleeva	6	6
(Argentina) P Tarabini	1	2
(South Africa) R Nideffer	1	6	6
(Belgium) S Appelmans	6	3	4
(Germany) B Rittner	6	7
(Japan) K Nagatsuka	2	5
WC	(France) K Quentrec	3	3
3	(Argentina) G Sabatini	6	6

Third round
14	(Bulgaria) K Maleeva	6	4	9
(South Africa) R Nideffer	3	6	7
(Germany) B Rittner	2	2
3	(Argentina) G Sabatini	6	6

Fourth round
14	(Bulgaria) K Maleeva	1	2
3	(Argentina) G Sabatini	6	6

==== Section 7 ====
First round
7	(Czech Republic) J Novotná	6	6
(Germany) C Porwik	3	3
(Australia) E Smylie	6	1	5
Q	(Greece) C Papadáki	4	6	7
(United States) T Whitlinger	1	4
(Italy) A-M Cecchini	6	6
(Czech Republic) K Kroupová	6	6
(Slovakia) K Studeníková	2	2
(Japan) M Endo	6	7^{7}
(Indonesia) Y Basuki	4	6^{0}
(United States) C Kuhlman	1	6	5
(Germany) S Frankl	6	1	7
(United States) D Graham	3	1
(Belarus) N Zvereva	6	6
(Latvia) L Neiland	0	4
11	(South Africa) A Coetzer	6	6

Second round
7	(Czech Republic) J Novotná	3	6	6
Q	(Greece) C Papadáki	6	2	2
(Italy) A-M Cecchini	6^{4}	3
(Czech Republic) K Kroupová	7^{7}	6
(Indonesia) Y Basuki	2	1
(Germany) S Frankl	6	6
(Belarus) N Zvereva	6	7^{8}
11	(South Africa) A Coetzer	2	6^{6}

Third round
7	(Czech Republic) J Novotná	2	6	6
(Czech Republic) K Kroupová	6	2	3
(Germany) S Frankl	3	2
(Belarus) N Zvereva	6	6

Fourth round
7	(Czech Republic) J Novotná	6	6
(Belarus) N Zvereva	3	3

==== Section 8 ====
First round
16	(Japan) K Date	6	6
(Germany) K Kschwendt	4	4
(Finland) N Dahlman	3	2
(Romania) R Dragomir	6	6
(France) P Paradis-Mangon	7	6
(Ukraine) N Medvedeva	5	1
(Netherlands) N Krijger-Jagerman	6	7
(Australia) M Jaggard-Lai	1	5
(Georgia (country)) L Meskhi	6	6
WC	(France) S Sabas	2	3
(United Kingdom) C Wood	6	4	1
(Germany) W Probst	4	6	6
(Japan) N Sawamatsu	6	6
(Italy) F Bonsignori	4	4
(Netherlands) M Kiene	3	6^{1}
2	(Spain) A Sánchez Vicario	6	7^{7}

Second round
16	(Japan) K Date	6	2	3
(Romania) R Dragomir	4	6	6
(France) P Paradis-Mangon	5	6	6
(Netherlands) N Krijger-Jagerman	7	1	3
(Georgia (country)) L Meskhi	6	6
(Germany) W Probst	2	4
(Japan) N Sawamatsu	0	0
2	(Spain) A Sánchez Vicario	6	6

Third round
(Romania) R Dragomir	6	6
(France) P Paradis-Mangon	4	3
(Georgia (country)) L Meskhi	3	0
2	(Spain) A Sánchez Vicario	6	6

Fourth round
(Romania) R Dragomir	0	1
2	(Spain) A Sánchez Vicario	6	6

Preceded by 1993 Australian Open – Women's singles	Grand Slam women's singles	Succeeded by 1993 Wimbledon Championships – Women's singles
