= 1994 Ilva Trophy – Doubles =

Doubles
- 1994 Ilva Trophy

Final
- Champions: (Romania) Irina Spîrlea (France) Noëlle van Lottum
- Runners-up: (Italy) Sandra Cecchini (France) Isabelle Demongeot
- Score: 6–3, 2–6, 6–1

Details
- Draw: 16 (1WC/1Q)
- Seeds: 4

Events
Singles	Doubles
← 1993 ·	Ilva Trophy

The 1994 Ilva Trophy – Doubles was an event of the 1994 Ilva Trophy women's tennis tournament and was played on outdoor clay courts at the Circulo Tennis Ilva Taranto in Taranto, Italy from 25 April until 1 May 1994. The draw comprised 16 teams of which four were seeded. Debbie Graham and Brenda Schultz were the defending champions, but Graham did not compete this year. Schultz teamed up with Miriam Oremans and lost in the semifinals to Sandra Cecchini and Isabelle Demongeot. Irina Spîrlea and Noëlle van Lottum won the title by defeating Cecchini and Demongeot 6–3, 2–6, 6–1 in the final.

== Seeds ==
1. (Belgium) Laurence Courtois / (Italy) Silvia Farina (first round)
2. (Netherlands) Miriam Oremans / (Netherlands) Brenda Schultz (semifinals)
3. (Netherlands) Kristie Boogert / (Netherlands) Nicole Muns-Jagerman (semifinals)
4. (Italy) Sandra Cecchini / (France) Isabelle Demongeot (final)

== Draw ==
=== Key ===
- Q = Qualifier
- WC = Wild card
- LL = Lucky loser
- Alt = Alternate
- SE = Special exempt
- PR = Protected ranking
- ITF = ITF entry
- JE = Junior exempt
- w/o = Walkover
- r = Retired
- d = Defaulted
- SR = Special ranking

=== Draw ===
First round
1	(Belgium) L Courtois (Italy) S Farina	2	2
(Romania) I Spîrlea (France) N van Lottum	6	6
WC	(Italy) F Lubiani (Italy) Ad Serra Zanetti	6	6^{3}	5
(Italy) S Attili (Italy) E Savoldi	4	7^{7}	7
3	(Netherlands) K Boogert (Netherlands) N Muns-Jagerman	6	6
Q	(Venezuela) M Mazzotta (Argentina) L Montalvo	3	2
(Czech Republic) R Bobková (Slovakia) K Habšudová	7^{7}	6
(Romania) C Cristea (Romania) R Dragomir	6^{4}	2
(Finland) N Dahlman (Sweden) M Strandlund	6	6
(United States) C Benjamin (Argentina) MJ Gaidano	4	2
(United States) A deLone (United States) L Glitz	4	0
4	(Italy) S Cecchini (France) I Demongeot	6	6
(Austria) S Dopfer (Finland) P Thorén	0	6	1
(France) A Fusai (Belgium) D Monami	6	1	6
(Italy) L Garrone (Czech Republic) E Martincová	1	3
2	(Netherlands) M Oremans (Netherlands) B Schultz	6	6

Quarterfinals
(Romania) I Spîrlea (France) N van Lottum	6	6
(Italy) S Attili (Italy) E Savoldi	2	2
3	(Netherlands) K Boogert (Netherlands) N Muns-Jagerman	6	6
(Czech Republic) R Bobková (Slovakia) K Habšudová	1	3
(Finland) N Dahlman (Sweden) M Strandlund	6	4	5
4	(Italy) S Cecchini (France) I Demongeot	2	6	7
(France) A Fusai (Belgium) D Monami	4	1
2	(Netherlands) M Oremans (Netherlands) B Schultz	6	6

Semifinals
(Romania) I Spîrlea (France) N van Lottum	7^{7}	6
3	(Netherlands) K Boogert (Netherlands) N Muns-Jagerman	6^{4}	3
4	(Italy) S Cecchini (France) I Demongeot	6	6
2	(Netherlands) M Oremans (Netherlands) B Schultz	4	3

Final
(Romania) I Spîrlea (France) N van Lottum	6	2	6
4	(Italy) S Cecchini (France) I Demongeot	3	6	1
