= 1992 Ilva Trophy – Singles =

Singles
- 1992 Ilva Trophy

Final
- Champion: (France) Julie Halard
- Runner-up: (Switzerland) Emanuela Zardo
- Score: 6–0, 7–5

Details
- Draw: 32 (2WC/4Q)
- Seeds: 8

Events
Singles	Doubles
← 1991 ·	Ilva Trophy	· 1993 →

Emanuela Zardo was the defending champion, but lost in the final to Julie Halard. The score was 6–0, 7–5.

== Seeds ==
1. (France) Julie Halard (champion)
2. (Czechoslovakia) Radka Zrubáková (semifinals)
3. (South Africa) Amanda Coetzer (quarterfinals)
4. (Australia) Rachel McQuillan (first round)
5. (Switzerland) Emanuela Zardo (final)
6. (Argentina) Inés Gorrochategui (second round)
7. (United States) Ann Grossman (quarterfinals)
8. (Italy) Silvia Farina (first round)

== Draw ==
=== Key ===
- Q = Qualifier
- WC = Wild card
- LL = Lucky loser
- Alt = Alternate
- SE = Special exempt
- PR = Protected ranking
- ITF = ITF entry
- JE = Junior exempt
- w/o = Walkover
- r = Retired
- d = Defaulted
- SR = Special ranking

=== Finals ===
Semifinals
1	(France) Julie Halard	6	6
(Italy) Linda Ferrando	3	4
5	(Switzerland) Emanuela Zardo	7	5	6
2	(Czechoslovakia) Radka Zrubáková	5	7	4

Final
1	(France) Julie Halard	6	7
5	(Switzerland) Emanuela Zardo	0	5

=== Top half ===
First round
1	(France) J Halard	6	1	6
(Argentina) C Tessi	0	6	1
Q	(Italy) G Pizzichini	0	6	6
(Austria) P Ritter	6	4	0
(France) C Mothes	6	3	6
(Argentina) F Labat	3	6	2
(Italy) F Bonsignori	6	6
8	(Italy) S Farina	3	2
3	(South Africa) A Coetzer	6	6
WC	(Italy) C Salvi	3	2
(France) N Herreman	7	6
Q	(Italy) E Savoldi	5	3
(Italy) K Piccolini	1	3
(Italy) L Ferrando	6	6
(Germany) I Cueto	6	1^{r}
6	(Argentina) I Gorrochategui	2	5

Second round
1	(France) J Halard	6	6
Q	(Italy) G Pizzichini	4	2
(France) C Mothes	6	6^{4}	6
(Italy) F Bonsignori	2	7^{7}	3
3	(South Africa) A Coetzer	4	6	7
(France) N Herreman	6	0	5
(Italy) L Ferrando	6	6
6	(Argentina) I Gorrochategui	2	4

Quarterfinals
1	(France) J Halard	6	3	6
(France) C Mothes	1	6	4
3	(South Africa) A Coetzer	4	2
(Italy) L Ferrando	6	6

Semifinals
1	(France) J Halard	6	6
(Italy) L Ferrando	3	4

=== Bottom half ===
First round
5	(Switzerland) E Zardo	6	6
Q	(Spain) E Bottini	2	2
(Switzerland) C Fauche	5	1
WC	(Italy) L Golarsa	7	6
(Germany) K Oeljeklaus	5	2
(Germany) V Martinek	7	6
(Italy) L Garrone	7^{7}	6
4	(Australia) R McQuillan	6^{4}	1
7	(United States) A Grossman	6	6
(Bulgaria) E Pampoulova	2	4
(France) S Niox-Château	6	6
(Finland) N Dahlman	3	4
(Belgium) S Wasserman	2	1
(Germany) S Frankl	6	6
Q	(Czechoslovakia) R Bobková	3	0
2	(Czechoslovakia) R Zrubáková	6	6

Second round
5	(Switzerland) E Zardo	6	7
WC	(Italy) L Golarsa	2	5
(Germany) V Martinek	6	6^{2}	6
(Italy) L Garrone	4	7^{7}	2
7	(United States) A Grossman	6	6
(France) S Niox-Château	3	1
(Germany) S Frankl	3	4
2	(Czechoslovakia) R Zrubáková	6	6

Quarterfinals
5	(Switzerland) E Zardo	7	7
(Germany) V Martinek	5	5
7	(United States) A Grossman	0	2
2	(Czechoslovakia) R Zrubáková	6	6

Semifinals
5	(Switzerland) E Zardo	7	5	6
2	(Czechoslovakia) R Zrubáková	5	7	4
