= 1992 Ilva Trophy – Doubles =

Doubles
- 1992 Ilva Trophy

Final
- Champions: (South Africa) Amanda Coetzer (Argentina) Inés Gorrochategui
- Runners-up: (Australia) Rachel McQuillan (Czechoslovakia) Radka Zrubáková
- Score: 4–6, 6–3, 7–3^{(7–0)}

Details
- Draw: 16 (1WC/1Q)
- Seeds: 4

Events
Singles	Doubles
← 1991 ·	Ilva Trophy	· 1993 →

Alexia Dechaume and Florencia Labat were the defending champions, but Dechaume chose to compete at Hamburg during the same week, reaching the quarterfinals. Labat teamed up with Veronika Martinek and lost in the first round to Nathalie Baudone and Cristina Salvi.

Amanda Coetzer and Inés Gorrochategui won the title by defeating Rachel McQuillan and Radka Zrubáková 4–6, 6–3, 7–3^{(7–0)} in the final.

== Seeds ==
1. (Australia) Rachel McQuillan / (Czechoslovakia) Radka Zrubáková (final)
2. (Italy) Laura Garrone / (Italy) Laura Golarsa (semifinals)
3. (Italy) Silvia Farina / (Italy) Linda Ferrando (first round)
4. (Australia) Kristin Godridge / (United States) Ann Grossman (first round)

== Draw ==
=== Key ===
- Q = Qualifier
- WC = Wild card
- LL = Lucky loser
- Alt = Alternate
- SE = Special exempt
- PR = Protected ranking
- ITF = ITF entry
- JE = Junior exempt
- w/o = Walkover
- r = Retired
- d = Defaulted
- SR = Special ranking

=== Draw ===
First round
1	(Australia) R McQuillan (Czechoslovakia) R Zrubáková	6	7
Q	(Italy) F Bonsignori (Germany) K Oeljeklaus	1	5
(Argentina) F Labat (Germany) V Martinek	4	2
(Italy) N Baudone (Italy) C Salvi	6	6
3	(Italy) S Farina (Italy) L Ferrando	6^{3}	6	5
(United States) J Fuchs (Sweden) M Strandlund	7^{7}	4	7
(Greece) C Papadáki (Italy) K Piccolini	6	6^{3}	3
(Czechoslovakia) R Bobková (Czechoslovakia) H Vildová	1	7^{7}	6
(Bulgaria) E Pampoulova (Austria) P Ritter	6	6
(France) N Herreman (France) S Niox-Château	2	3
(South Africa) A Coetzer (Argentina) I Gorrochategui	6	7^{7}
4	(Australia) K Godridge (Australia) A Grossman	4	6^{5}
WC	(Italy) R Grande (Italy) E Savoldi	6^{5}	1
(Australia) J Hodder (Sweden) M Lindström	7^{7}	6
(Finland) N Dahlman (Germany) S Frankl	2	1
2	(Italy) L Garrone (Italy) L Golarsa	6	6

Quarterfinals
1	(Australia) R McQuillan (Czechoslovakia) R Zrubáková	6	4	6
(Italy) N Baudone (Italy) C Salvi	2	6	1
(United States) J Fuchs (Sweden) M Strandlund	2	6	4
(Czechoslovakia) R Bobková (Czechoslovakia) H Vildová	6	2	6
(Bulgaria) E Pampoulova (Austria) P Ritter
(South Africa) A Coetzer (Argentina) I Gorrochategui	w/o
(Australia) J Hodder (Sweden) M Lindström	3	2
2	(Italy) L Garrone (Italy) L Golarsa	6	6

Semifinals
1	(Australia) R McQuillan (Czechoslovakia) R Zrubáková	6	6
(Czechoslovakia) R Bobková (Czechoslovakia) H Vildová	0	1
(South Africa) A Coetzer (Argentina) I Gorrochategui	6	6
2	(Italy) L Garrone (Italy) L Golarsa	3	2

Final
1	(Australia) R McQuillan (Czechoslovakia) R Zrubáková	6	3	6^{0}
(South Africa) A Coetzer (Argentina) I Gorrochategui	4	6	7^{7}
