= 1994 Ilva Trophy =

- Date: 25 April – 1 May
- Edition: 8th
- Category: Tier IV
- Draw: 32S / 16D
- Prize money: $100,000
- Surface: Clay / outdoor
- Location: Taranto, Italy
- Venue: Circulo Tennis Ilva Taranto

Champions

Singles
- (France) Julie Halard

Doubles
- (Romania) Irina Spîrlea / (France) Noëlle van Lottum
← 1993 ·	Ilva Trophy

The 1994 Ilva Trophy was a women's tennis tournament played on outdoor clay courts at the Circulo Tennis Ilva Taranto in Taranto, Italy that was part of the WTA Tier IV category of the 1994 WTA Tour. It was the eighth edition of the tournament and was held from 25 April until 1 May 1994. Third-seeded Julie Halard won the singles title, her second at the event after 1992, and earned $18,000 first-prize money.

== Finals ==
=== Singles ===
(France) Julie Halard defeated (Romania) Irina Spîrlea 6–2, 6–3

- It was Halard' 1st singles title of the year and the 3rd of her career.

=== Doubles ===
(Romania) Irina Spîrlea / (France) Noëlle van Lottum defeated (Italy) Sandra Cecchini / (France) Isabelle Demongeot 6–3, 2–6, 6–1
