= 1994 Ilva Trophy – Singles =

Singles
- 1994 Ilva Trophy

Final
- Champion: (France) Julie Halard
- Runner-up: (Romania) Irina Spîrlea
- Score: 6–2, 6–3

Details
- Draw: 32 (2WC/4Q)
- Seeds: 8

Events
Singles	Doubles
← 1993 ·	Ilva Trophy

Brenda Schultz was the defending champion, but lost in the semifinals to Julie Halard.

Halard won the title by defeating Irina Spîrlea 6–2, 6–3 in the final.

== Seeds ==
1. (Austria) Judith Wiesner (first round)
2. (Netherlands) Brenda Schultz (semifinals)
3. (France) Julie Halard (champion)
4. (Netherlands) Miriam Oremans (first round)
5. (Czech Republic) Radka Bobková (second round)
6. (Italy) Sandra Cecchini (quarterfinals)
7. (Netherlands) Kristie Boogert (first round)
8. (Belgium) Dominique Monami (first round)

== Draw ==
=== Key ===
- Q = Qualifier
- WC = Wild card
- LL = Lucky loser
- Alt = Alternate
- SE = Special exempt
- PR = Protected ranking
- ITF = ITF entry
- JE = Junior exempt
- w/o = Walkover
- r = Retired
- d = Defaulted
- SR = Special ranking

=== Finals ===
Semifinals
(Romania) Irina Spîrlea	6	3	6
(Austria) Sandra Dopfer	0	6	3
3	(France) Julie Halard	7	6
2	(Netherlands) Brenda Schultz	5	0

Final
(Romania) Irina Spîrlea	2	3
3	(France) Julie Halard	6	6

=== Top half ===
First round
1	(Austria) J Wiesner	6^{6}	3
(France) A Fusai	7^{8}	6
(Romania) R Dragomir	0	0
(Italy) F Bonsignori	6	6
(Croatia) N Ercegović	7	6
(Netherlands) N Muns-Jagerman	5	2
(Romania) I Spîrlea	6	6
7	(Netherlands) K Boogert	1	2
4	(Netherlands) M Oremans	2	6	2
Q	(Italy) E Savoldi	6	3	6
WC	(Italy) F Lubiani	4	6	4
(Belgium) L Courtois	6	4	6
(Austria) S Dopfer	6	7^{11}
(United States) G Fernández	2	6^{9}
(Italy) M Grossi	3	0
5	(Czech Republic) R Bobková	6	6

Second round
(France) A Fusai	6	6
(Italy) F Bonsignori	3	2
(Croatia) N Ercegović	1	1
(Romania) I Spîrlea	6	6
Q	(Italy) E Savoldi	5	4
(Belgium) L Courtois	7	6
(Austria) S Dopfer	7^{10}	2	6
5	(Czech Republic) R Bobková	6^{8}	6	3

Quarterfinals
(France) A Fusai	3	2
(Romania) I Spîrlea	6	6
(Belgium) L Courtois	3	0
(Austria) S Dopfer	6	6

Semifinals
(Romania) I Spîrlea	6	3	6
(Austria) S Dopfer	0	6	3

=== Bottom half ===
First round
6	(Italy) S Cecchini	5	6	6
Q	(Italy) L Garrone	7	3	3
(Romania) C Cristea	5	5
(Italy) S Farina	7	7
(Argentina) MJ Gaidano	6	6
Q	(Italy) L Lapi	3	3
(France) S Pitkowski	5	2
3	(France) J Halard	7	6
8	(Belgium) D Monami	2	0
(Slovakia) K Habšudová	6	6
(Belgium) S Wasserman	6	6
(Czech Republic) E Martincová	4	2
WC	(Italy) Ad Serra Zanetti	3	4
(France) N van Lottum	6	6
Q	(Italy) C Salvi	0	3
2	(Netherlands) B Schultz	6	6

Second round
6	(Italy) S Cecchini	7	6
(Italy) S Farina	5	0
(Argentina) MJ Gaidano	3	0
3	(France) J Halard	6	6
(Slovakia) K Habšudová	2	6	7
(Belgium) S Wasserman	6	2	5
(France) N van Lottum	6	4	1
2	(Netherlands) B Schultz	3	6	6

Quarterfinals
6	(Italy) S Cecchini	4	6	5
3	(France) J Halard	6	3	7
(Slovakia) K Habšudová	6^{1}	5
2	(Netherlands) B Schultz	7^{7}	7

Semifinals
3	(France) J Halard	7	6
2	(Netherlands) B Schultz	5	0
