= 1993 Ilva Trophy =

- Date: 27 April – 2 May
- Edition: 7th
- Category: Tier IV
- Draw: 32S / 16D
- Prize money: $100,000
- Surface: Clay / outdoor
- Location: Taranto, Italy
- Venue: Circulo Tennis Ilva Taranto

Champions

Singles
- (Netherlands) Brenda Schultz

Doubles
- (United States) Debbie Graham / (Netherlands) Brenda Schultz
← 1992 ·	Ilva Trophy	· 1994 →

The 1993 Ilva Trophy was a women's tennis tournament played on outdoor clay courts at the Circulo Tennis Ilva Taranto in Taranto, Italy that was part of the WTA Tier IV category of the 1993 WTA Tour. It was the seventh edition of the tournament and was held from 27 April until 2 May 1993. Fifth-seeded Brenda Schultz won the singles title and earned $18,000 first-prize money.

== Finals ==
=== Singles ===
(Netherlands) Brenda Schultz defeated (United States) Debbie Graham 7–6^{(7–5)}, 6–2

- It was Schultz' 1st singles title of the year and the 3rd of her career.

=== Doubles ===
(United States) Debbie Graham / (Netherlands) Brenda Schultz defeated (Czechoslovakia) Petra Langrová / (Argentina) Mercedes Paz 6–0, 6–4
