= 1993 Ilva Trophy – Doubles =

Doubles
- 1993 Ilva Trophy

Final
- Champions: (United States) Debbie Graham (Netherlands) Brenda Schultz
- Runners-up: (Czech Republic) Petra Langrová (Argentina) Mercedes Paz
- Score: 6–0, 6–4

Details
- Draw: 16 (1WC/1Q)
- Seeds: 4

Events
Singles	Doubles
← 1992 ·	Ilva Trophy	· 1994 →

Amanda Coetzer and Inés Gorrochategui were the defending champions, but none competed this year.

Debbie Graham and Brenda Schultz won the title by defeating Petra Langrová and Mercedes Paz 6–0, 6–4 in the final.

== Seeds ==
1. (Czech Republic) Petra Langrová / (Argentina) Mercedes Paz (final)
2. (United States) Debbie Graham / (Netherlands) Brenda Schultz (champions)
3. (Italy) Sandra Cecchini / (Italy) Laura Garrone (semifinals)
4. (France) Julie Halard / (Slovakia) Radka Zrubáková (quarterfinals)

== Draw ==
First round
1	(Czech Republic) P Langrová (Argentina) M Paz	6	6
(United States) L Glitz (Australia) J Hodder	2	2
(Argentina) MJ Gaidano (Italy) M Grossi	6	5	4
(France) A Fusai (France) N Herreman	4	7	6
4	(France) J Halard (Slovakia) R Zrubáková	4	7	7
(Czech Republic) I Jankovská (Czech Republic) E Melicharová	6	5	5
(Slovakia) K Habšudová (Netherlands) N Muns-Jagerman	6	6
(United States) J Fuchs (Australia) K Sharpe	3	2
(Finland) N Dahlman (United Kingdom) C Wood	6	6^{5}	6
(Czech Republic) R Bobková (Spain) V Ruano Pascual	4	7^{7}	2
(Czech Republic) E Martincová (Czech Republic) J Pospíšilová	7	6^{6}	3
3	(Italy) S Cecchini (Italy) L Garrone	5	7^{8}	6
WC	(Italy) S Farina (Italy) R Grande	6	1	6
(South Africa) J Kruger (Greece) C Papadáki	1	6	2
Q	(Czech Republic) K Hrdličková (Czech Republic) P Kučová	3	4
2	(United States) D Graham (Netherlands) B Schultz	6	6

Quarterfinals
1	(Czech Republic) P Langrová (Argentina) M Paz	6	7^{7}
(France) A Fusai (France) N Herreman	3	6^{5}
4	(France) J Halard (Slovakia) R Zrubáková	6	5	0
(Slovakia) K Habšudová (Netherlands) N Muns-Jagerman	2	7	6
(Finland) N Dahlman (United Kingdom) C Wood	4	6	6^{3}
3	(Italy) S Cecchini (Italy) L Garrone	6	4	7^{7}
WC	(Italy) S Farina (Italy) R Grande	4	1
2	(United States) D Graham (Netherlands) B Schultz	6	6

Semifinals
1	(Czech Republic) P Langrová (Argentina) M Paz	6	6
(Slovakia) K Habšudová (Netherlands) N Muns-Jagerman	4	3
3	(Italy) S Cecchini (Italy) L Garrone	0	3
2	(United States) D Graham (Netherlands) B Schultz	6	6

Final
1	(Czech Republic) P Langrová (Argentina) M Paz	0	4
2	(United States) D Graham (Netherlands) B Schultz	6	6
