= 1992 Ilva Trophy =

- Date: 28 April – 3 May
- Edition: 6th
- Category: Tier V
- Draw: 32S / 16D
- Prize money: $100,000
- Surface: Clay / outdoor
- Location: Taranto, Italy
- Venue: Circulo Tennis Ilva Taranto

Champions

Singles
- (France) Julie Halard

Doubles
- (South Africa) Amanda Coetzer (Argentina) Inés Gorrochategui
← 1991 ·	Ilva Trophy	· 1993 →

The 1992 Ilva Trophy was a women's tennis tournament played on outdoor clay courts at the Circulo Tennis Ilva Taranto in Taranto, Italy that was part of the WTA Tier V category of the 1992 WTA Tour. It was the sixth edition of the tournament and was held from 28 April until 3 May 1992. First-seeded Julie Halard won the singles title and earned $18,000 first-prize money.

== Finals ==
=== Singles ===
(France) Julie Halard defeated (Switzerland) Emanuela Zardo 6–0, 7–5

- It was Halard's 1st singles title of the year and the 2nd of her career.

=== Doubles ===
(South Africa) Amanda Coetzer / (Argentina) Inés Gorrochategui defeated (Australia) Rachel McQuillan / (Czechoslovakia) Radka Zrubáková 4–6, 6–3, 7–3^{(7–0)}
