= 1992 Open Whirlpool - Ville de Bayonne =

- Date: 28 September – 4 October
- Edition: 4th
- Category: Tier IV
- Draw: 32S / 16D
- Prize money: $150,000
- Surface: Carpet/ indoor
- Location: Bayonne, France
- Venue: Salle Lauga

Champions

Singles
- (Switzerland) Manuela Maleeva-Fragnière

Doubles
- (Italy) Linda Ferrando / (Czechoslovakia) Petra Langrová
← 1991 ·	WTA Bayonne

The 1992 Open Whirlpool - Ville de Bayonne, also known as the WTA Bayonne, was a women's tennis tournament played on indoor carpet courts at the Salle Lauga in Bayonne, France and was part of the Tier IV category of the 1992 WTA Tour. It was the fourth and last edition of the tournament and was held from 28 September until 4 October 1992. First-seeded Manuela Maleeva-Fragnière won her second consecutive singles title at the event and collected $27,000 fist-prize money and 190 ranking points.

== Finals ==
=== Singles ===
(Switzerland) Manuela Maleeva-Fragnière defeated (France) Nathalie Tauziat 6–7^{(4–7)}, 6–2, 6–3

- It was Maleeva-Fragnière's only singles title of the year and the 16th of her career.

=== Doubles ===
(Italy) Linda Ferrando / (Czechoslovakia) Petra Langrová defeated (Germany) Claudia Kohde-Kilsch / (United States) Stephanie Rehe 1–6, 6–3, 6–4.

- It was Ferrando's only doubles title of her career. It was Langrová's only doubles title of the year and the 4th of her career.
