= 1990 Tournoi de Bayonne =

- Date: 24–30 September
- Edition: 2nd
- Category: Tier V
- Draw: 32S / 16D
- Prize money: $100,000
- Surface: Carpet/ indoor
- Location: Bayonne, France

Champions

Singles
- (France) Nathalie Tauziat

Doubles
- (Australia) Louise Field / (France) Catherine Tanvier
| ← 1989 · | WTA Bayonne | · 1991 → |

The 1990 Tournoi de Bayonne, also known as the WTA Bayonne, was a women's tennis tournament played on indoor carpet courts in Bayonne, France, and was part of the Tier V category of the 1990 WTA Tour. It was the second edition of the tournament and was held from 24 September until 30 September 1990. Second-seeded Nathalie Tauziat won the singles title and collected $18,000 fist-prize money.

== Finals ==
=== Singles ===
(France) Nathalie Tauziat defeated (West Germany) Anke Huber 6–3, 7–6^{(10–8)}

- It was Tauziat's only singles title of the year and the 1st of her career.

=== Doubles ===
(Australia) Louise Field / (France) Catherine Tanvier defeated (Australia) Jo-Anne Faull / (Australia) Rachel McQuillan 7–6^{(7–3)}, 6–7^{(5–7)}, 7–6^{(7–5)}

- It was Field's 2nd and last doubles title of the year and of her career. It was Tanvier's only doubles title of the year and the 8th of her career.
