= 1989 Open de la Côte Basque =

- Date: 16–22 October
- Edition: 1st
- Category: Category 2
- Draw: 32S / 16D
- Prize money: $100,000
- Surface: Hard / indoor
- Location: Bayonne, France

Champions

Singles
- (Bulgaria) Katerina Maleeva

Doubles
- (Netherlands) Manon Bollegraf / (France) Catherine Tanvier
WTA Bayonne	· 1990 →

The 1989 Open de la Côte Basque, also known as the WTA Bayonne, was a women's tennis tournament played on indoor hard courts in Bayonne, France, and was part of the Category 2 tier of the 1989 WTA Tour. It was the inaugural edition of the tournament and was held from 16 October until 22 October 1989. Third-seeded Katerina Maleeva won the singles title.

== Finals ==
=== Singles ===
(Bulgaria) Katerina Maleeva defeated (Spain) Conchita Martínez 6–2, 6–2

- It was Maleeva's 2nd singles title of the year and the 7th of her career.

=== Doubles ===
(Netherlands) Manon Bollegraf / (France) Catherine Tanvier defeated (South Africa) Elna Reinach / (Italy) Raffaella Reggi 7–6^{(7–3)}, 7–5

- It was Bollegraf's 3rd doubles title of the year and the 4th of her career. It was Tanvier's only doubles title of the year and the 7th of her career.
