= 1991 Open Whirlpool - Ville de Bayonne =

- Date: 23–29 September
- Edition: 3rd
- Category: Tier IV
- Draw: 32S / 16D
- Prize money: $150,000
- Surface: Carpet/ indoor
- Location: Bayonne, France

Champions

Singles
- (Switzerland) Manuela Maleeva-Fragnière

Doubles
- (Argentina) Patricia Tarabini / (France) Nathalie Tauziat
← 1990 ·	WTA Bayonne	· 1992 →

The 1991 Open Whirlpool - Ville de Bayonne, also known as the WTA Bayonne, was a women's tennis tournament played on indoor carpet courts in Bayonne, France, and was part of the Tier IV category of the 1991 WTA Tour. It was the third edition of the tournament and was held from 23 September until 29 September 1991. First-seeded Manuela Maleeva-Fragnière won the singles title and collected $27,000 fist-prize money.

== Finals ==
=== Singles ===
(Switzerland) Manuela Maleeva-Fragnière defeated (Georgia (country)) Leila Meskhi 4–6, 6–3, 6–4

- It was Maleeva-Fragnière's 3rd and last singles title of the year and the 15th of her career.

=== Doubles ===
(Argentina) Patricia Tarabini / (France) Nathalie Tauziat defeated (Australia) Rachel McQuillan / (France) Catherine Tanvier 6–3 ret.

- It was Tarabini's only doubles title of the year and the 10th of her career. It was Tauziat's only doubles title of the year and the 6th of her career.
