= Katja Oeljeklaus =

German tennis player

- Country (sports): Germany
- Born: 10 February 1971 (age 54)
- Plays: Right-handed
- Prize money: $85,618

Singles
- Career titles: 1 ITF
- Highest ranking: No. 98 (2 December 1991)

Grand Slam singles results
- Australian Open: 1R (1992)
- French Open: 1R (1992)
- Wimbledon: 1R (1992)

Doubles
- Career titles: 1 ITF
- Highest ranking: No. 217 (29 March 1993)

Katja Oeljeklaus (born 10 February 1971) is a former professional tennis player from Germany.

She comes from the town of Ladbergen in North Rhine-Westphalia.

A right-handed player, Oeljeklaus began competing on the professional tour in 1990. Her best performance on the WTA Tour was a semifinal appearance at the St. Petersburg Open in 1991, a year in which she reached her best ranking of 98 in the world. This allowed her to feature in the main draw of the Australian Open, French Open and Wimbledon Championships in 1992.

She is now known as Katja Brünemeyer.

== ITF finals ==
$50,000 tournaments
$25,000 tournaments
$10,000 tournaments

=== Singles (1–5) ===
Result	No.	Date	Tournament	Surface	Opponent	Score
Loss	1.	1 January 1990	ITF Bamberg, West Germany	Carpet (i)	(West Germany) Heike Thoms	5–7, 3–6
Winner	2.	4 June 1990	ITF Lisbon, Portugal	Clay	(Austria) Désirée Leupold	0–6, 6–2, 6–1
Loss	3.	30 July 1990	ITF Rheda, West Germany	Clay	(Soviet Union) Agnese Blumberga	6–3, 4–6, 4–6
Loss	4.	1 July 1991	ITF Stuttgart, Germany	Clay	(Germany) Silke Frankl	0–6, 5–7
Loss	5.	15 July 1991	ITF Karlovy Vary, Czechoslovakia	Clay	(Czechoslovakia) Zdeňka Málková	4–6, 6–2, 6–7^{(0)}
Loss	6.	26 July 1993	ITF Rheda, Germany	Clay	(Czech Republic) Eva Švíglerová	4–6, 4–6

=== Doubles (1–2) ===
Result	No.	Date	Tournament	Surface	Partner	Opponents	Score
Loss	1.	31 August 1992	ITF Klagenfurt, Austria	Clay	(Germany) Heike Thoms	(Czechoslovakia) Denisa Krajčovičová (Czechoslovakia) Jana Pospíšilová	w/o
Win	2.	26 July 1993	ITF Rheda, Germany	Clay	(Czech Republic) Petra Holubová	(Netherlands) Gaby Coorengel (Netherlands) Amy van Buuren	7–5, 6–0
Loss	3.	3 April 1994	ITF Moulins, France	Clay	(France) Angelique Olivier	(Sweden) Maria Lindström (Sweden) Maria Strandlund	6–3, 6–7, 0–6
