= Emanuela Zardo =

Swiss tennis player

- Country (sports): Switzerland
- Born: 24 April 1970 (age 54)
- Height: 164 cm (5 ft 5 in)
- Turned pro: 1986
- Retired: 1998
- Plays: Left-handed (two–handed backhand)
- Prize money: US$399,887

Singles
- Career record: 229–175
- Career titles: 1 WTA, 10 ITF
- Highest ranking: No. 27 (6 May 1991)

Grand Slam singles results
- Australian Open: 4R (1994)
- French Open: 2R (1991,1992)
- Wimbledon: 2R (1991)
- US Open: 2R (1990,91,92,93,94)

Doubles
- Career record: 22–73
- Career titles: 0 WTA, 0 ITF
- Highest ranking: No. 159 (31 January 1994)

Grand Slam doubles results
- Australian Open: 1R (1994)

Emanuela Zardo (born 24 April 1970) is a former professional tennis player who competed for Switzerland. She was active on the WTA Tour in the late 1980s and through the 1990s, and she was among the top 100 in the world from 1990 to 1994.

Zardo reached her highest ranking of No. 27 on 6 May 1991. She won one WTA singles title, and she was twice a runner-up in singles competition.

Her best performance at a Grand Slam occurred at the 1994 Australian Open when she made the fourth round, losing to Jana Novotná.

== WTA career finals ==
=== Singles: 3 (1–2) ===
Legend: Before 2009	Legend: Starting in 2009
Grand Slam tournaments (0)
WTA Championships (0)
Tier I (0)	Premier Mandatory (0)
Tier II (0)	Premier 5 (0)
Tier III (0-0)	Premier (0)
Tier IV & V (1-2)	International (0)

Result	W-L	Date	Tournament	Surface	Opponent	Score
Win	1–0	Apr 1991	Taranto, Italy	Clay	(Austria) Petra Ritter	7–5, 6–2
Loss	1–1	Apr 1992	Taranto, Italy	Clay	(France) Julie Halard	0–6, 5–7
Loss	1–2	Sep 1992	Paris, France	Clay	(Italy) Sandra Cecchini	2–6, 1–6

== ITF finals ==
=== Singles (10-5) ===
$100,000 tournaments
$75,000 tournaments
$50,000 tournaments
$25,000 tournaments
$10,000 tournaments

Result	No.	Date	Tournament	Surface	Opponent	Score
Win	1.	31 August 1987	Vilamoura, Portugal	Clay	(West Germany) Cornelia Lechner	6–1, 6–3
Win	2.	7 September 1987	Madeira, Portugal	Clay	(Belgium) Corine Bousmans	6–3, 6–4
Loss	3.	17 April 1989	Caserta, Italy	Clay	(Australia) Rachel McQuillan	6–4, 6–7, 4–6
Win	4.	12 June 1989	Porto, Portugal	Clay	(Belgium) Sabine Appelmans	7–5, 6–3
Loss	5.	17 July 1989	Darmstadt, West Germany	Clay	(Czechoslovakia) Andrea Strnadová	1–6, 1–6
Win	6.	7 May 1990	Modena, Italy	Clay	(Italy) Katia Piccolini	6–1, 4–6, 7–5
Win	7.	22 April 1991	Caserta, Italy	Clay	(Spain) Ana Segura	6–7, 7–6, 6–1
Win	8.	1 June 1992	Milan, Italy	Clay	(Italy) Flora Perfetti	6–4, 6–4
Win	9.	8 June 1992	Reggio Emilia, Italy	Clay	(Romania) Ruxandra Dragomir	6–1, 7–6^{(7–2)}
Loss	10.	6 September 1993	Spoleto, Italy	Clay	(Austria) Sandra Dopfer	4–6, 0–6
Win	11.	11 September 1995	Sofia, Bulgaria	Clay	(Czech Republic) Ivana Havrlíková	6–2, 6–3
Win	12.	18 September 1995	Bucharest, Romania	Clay	(Spain) Cristina Torrens Valero	6–3, 6–4
Loss	13.	3 November 1996	Edinburgh, United Kingdom	Hard (i)	(Czech Republic) Denisa Chládková	6–7, 0–6
Loss	14.	8 September 1997	Fano, Italy	Clay	(Romania) Andreea Ehritt-Vanc	3–6, 5–7
Win	15.	12 October 1997	Biel, Switzerland	Clay	(Switzerland) Caecilia Charbonnier	3–6, 6–1, 7–5

=== Doubles (0-2) ===
Result	No.	Date	Tournament	Surface	Partner	Opponents	Score
Loss	1.	25 August 1996	Athens, Greece	Clay	(France) Virginie Massart	(Czech Republic) Cătălina Cristea (Czech Republic) Helena Vildová	2–6, 4–6
Loss	2.	14 June 1998	Lenzerheide, Switzerland	Clay	(Argentina) Paula Racedo	(Switzerland) Laura Bao (Switzerland) Caecilia Charbonnier	4–6, 0–6

== Grand Slam singles performance timeline ==
Key
W	F	SF	QF	#R	RR	Q#	DNQ	A	NH

(W) winner; (F) finalist; (SF) semifinalist; (QF) quarterfinalist; (#R) rounds 4, 3, 2, 1; (RR) round-robin stage; (Q#) qualification round; (DNQ) did not qualify; (A) absent; (NH) not held; (SR) strike rate (events won / competed); (W–L) win–loss record.

Tournament	1990	1991	1992	1993	1994	1995
Australian Open	1R	1R	1R	1R	4R	1R
French Open	1R	2R	2R	1R	1R	A
Wimbledon	A	2R	A	1R	1R	A
US Open	2R	2R	2R	2R	2R	A
