= Francesca Romano =

Italian tennis player

- Country (sports): Italy
- Born: 7 February 1971 (age 54); Rome, Italy
- Retired: 2008
- Prize money: $ 128,406

Singles
- Career record: 128–105
- Career titles: 2 ITF
- Highest ranking: No. 77 (20 August 1990)

Grand Slam singles results
- Australian Open: 2R (1991)
- French Open: 1R (1990, 1991, 1993)
- Wimbledon: 1R (1991, 1993)
- US Open: 1R (1991)

Doubles
- Career record: 32–32
- Career titles: 2 ITF
- Highest ranking: No. 197 (27 April 1992)
Medal record
Mediterranean Games
Silver medal – second place	1987 Latakia	Women's Doubles
Bronze medal – third place	1987 Latakia	Women's Singles

Francesca Romano (born 7 February 1971 in Rome) is a former female tennis player from Italy, who competed on the WTA Tour. She reached a career-high ranking of #77 in August 1990 and reached the second round of the 1991 Australian Open.

== ITF finals ==
=== Singles (3–2) ===
$25,000 tournaments
$10,000 tournaments

Result	No.	Date	Tournament	Surface	Opponent	Score
Loss	1.	18 July 1988	Subiaco, Italy	Clay	(Italy) Katia Piccolini	5–7, 3–6
Win	2.	3 September 1989	Arzachena, Italy	Hard	(Switzerland) Csilla Bartos-Cserepy	1–6, 7–5, 6–1
Win	3.	23 July 1990	Milan, Italy	Clay	(France) Sybille Niox-Château	6–4, 6–3
Win	4.	24 February 1992	Valencia, Spain	Clay	(France) Angelique Olivier	5–7, 6–1, 6–4
Loss	5.	22 September 1996	Sofia, Bulgaria	Clay	(Czech Republic) Lenka Němečková	2–6, 3–6

=== Doubles (2–1) ===
Result	No.	Date	Tournament	Surface	Partner	Opponents	Score
Win	1.	3 April 1988	Rome, Italy	Clay	(Italy) Marzia Grossi	(Argentina) Fernanda González (Argentina) Mariana Pérez Roldán	7–5, 6–3
Win	2.	3 June 1991	Milan, Italy	Clay	(Italy) Nathalie Baudone	(Spain) Rosa Bielsa (Spain) Janet Souto	6–4, 7–5
Loss	3.	20 September 1993	Capua, Italy	Clay	(Italy) Flora Perfetti	(Czech Republic) Ivana Jankovská (Czech Republic) Eva Melicharová	3–6, 6–3, 6–7
