= Brenda Schultz-McCarthy =

Dutch tennis player (born 1970)

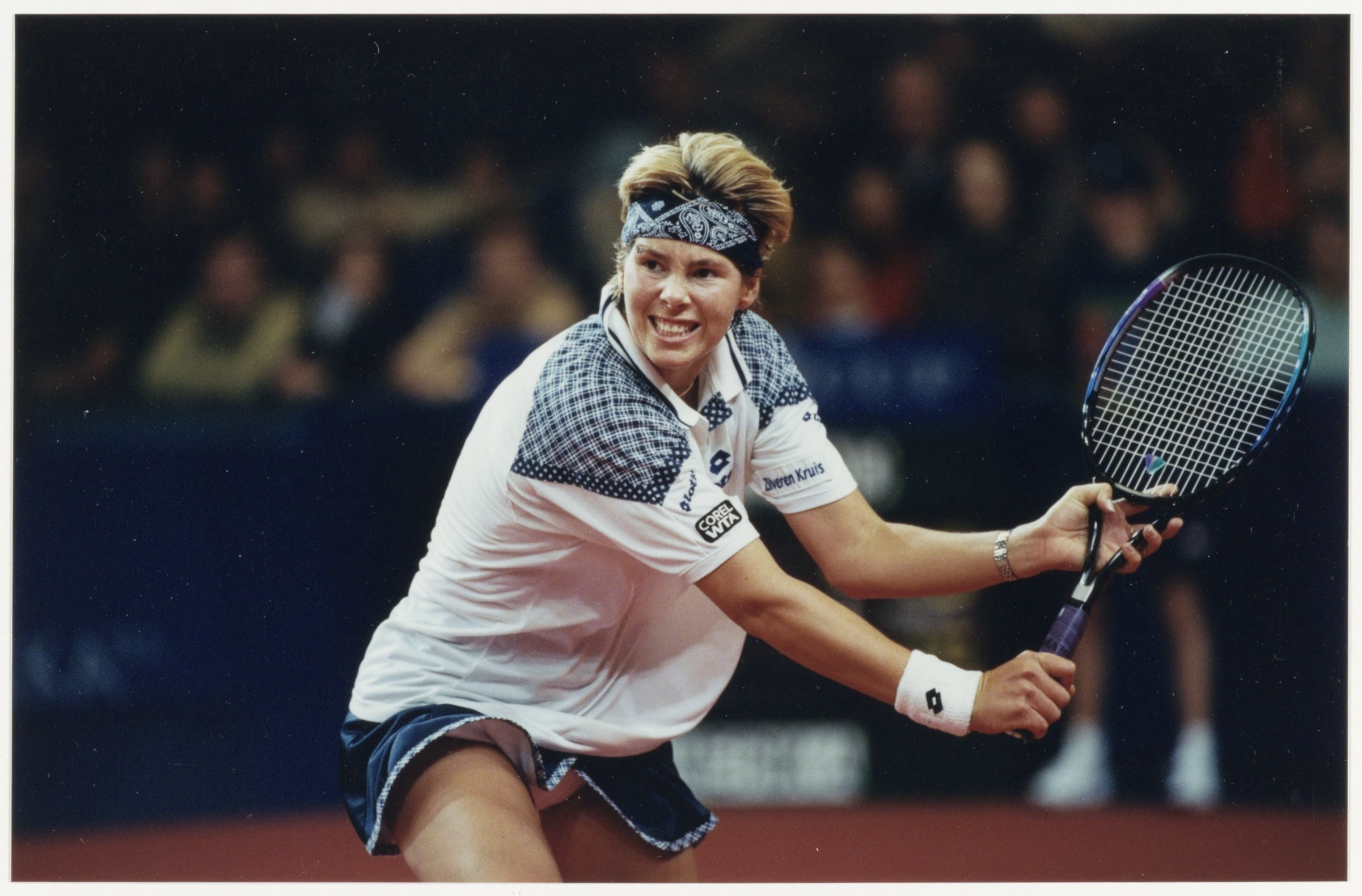
- Country (sports): Netherlands
- Residence: Juno Beach, Florida, United States
- Born: 28 December 1970 (age 55) Haarlem, Netherlands
- Height: 1.88 m (6 ft 2 in)
- Turned pro: September 1986
- Retired: 2008
- Plays: Right-handed (one-handed backhand)
- Prize money: US$2,632,740

Singles
- Career record: 403–293
- Career titles: 7 WTA, 2 ITF
- Highest ranking: No. 9 (20 May 1996)

Grand Slam singles results
- Australian Open: 4R (1989, 1995, 1996)
- French Open: 4R (1988, 1993)
- Wimbledon: QF (1995)
- US Open: QF (1995)

Doubles
- Career record: 238–177
- Career titles: 9 WTA, 1 ITF
- Highest ranking: No. 7 (2 October 1995)

Grand Slam doubles results
- Australian Open: SF (1990, 1992)
- French Open: SF (1989)
- Wimbledon: SF (1995)
- US Open: F (1995)

Grand Slam mixed doubles results
- Australian Open: 2R (1992)
- French Open: F (1988)
- Wimbledon: QF (1991)
- US Open: SF (1997)

Brenda Anne Marie Schultz-McCarthy (born 28 December 1970) is a former Dutch tennis player. Primarily known by her maiden name Brenda Schultz, she married Sean McCarthy, a former American football player at University of Cincinnati, on 8 April 1995 and took his name. Schultz is known for her fast serve; she has the eighth-fastest serve ever recorded by a female tennis player.

== Tennis career ==
Schultz' career high was in 1996 when she reached World No. 9. She reached the quarterfinals at Wimbledon and the US Open in 1995. She retired from tennis in 1999 with longstanding injuries. She came out of retirement in 2005, playing Fed Cup and WTA tournaments in 2006. The best result of her comeback came in June 2006 at the Tier III Ordina Open in the Netherlands, reaching the quarterfinals with wins over two players ranked in the top 70 on the WTA Tour.

In July 2006, Schultz-McCarthy claimed her place as the fastest server in WTA history, recording a 130 mph (209 km/h) serve in the first round of the Western & Southern Financial Group Women's Open qualifying tournament, held in Cincinnati, Ohio. Venus Williams previously held the women's record set in 1998 of 127 mph (204 km/h) in a match in a quarter-finals win against Mary Pierce in Zurich. Williams would tie the record in 2008. In June 2007, Schultz-McCarthy won an ITF tournament in Surbiton.

== Grand Slam finals ==
=== Doubles: 1 (0–1) ===
Result	Year	Championship	Surface	Partner	Opponents	Score
Loss	1995	US Open	Hard	(Australia) Rennae Stubbs	(United States) Gigi Fernández (Belarus) Natasha Zvereva	5–7, 3–6

=== Mixed doubles: 1 (0–1) ===
Result	Year	Championship	Surface	Partner	Opponents	Score
Loss	1988	French Open	Clay	(Netherlands) Michiel Schapers	(United States) Lori McNeil (Mexico) Jorge Lozano	5–7, 2–6

== WTA career finals ==
=== Singles (7 wins, 9 losses) ===
Legend
Grand Slam (0–0)
WTA Tour Championship (0–0)
Tier I (0–1)
Tier II (0–0)
Tier III (5–3)
Tier IV & V (2–5)

Result	W/L	Date	Tournament	Surface	Opponent	Score
Loss	0–1	Feb 1988	Oklahoma City, U.S.	Carpet (i)	(United States) Lori McNeil	3–6, 2–6
Loss	0–2	Apr 1988	Taipei, Taiwan	Carpet (i)	(United States) Stephanie Rehe	4–6, 4–6
Loss	0–3	Jan 1989	Brisbane, Australia	Hard	(Czech Republic) Helena Suková	6–7^{(6–8)}, 6–7^{(6–8)}
Win	1–3	Aug 1991	Schenectady, U.S.	Hard	(France) Alexia Dechaume	7–6^{(7–5)}, 6–2
Win	2–3	Jun 1992	Birmingham, UK	Grass	(Australia) Jenny Byrne	6–2, 6–2
Loss	2–4	Jul 1992	Palermo, Italy	Clay	(France) Mary Pierce	1–6, 7–6^{(7–3)}, 1–6
Loss	2–5	Aug 1992	Schenectady, U.S.	Hard (i)	(Germany) Barbara Rittner	6–7^{(3–7)}, 3–6
Win	3–5	May 1993	Taranto, Italy	Clay	(United States) Debbie Graham	7–6^{(7–5)}, 6–2
Loss	3–6	Feb 1994	Oklahoma City, U.S.	Hard (i)	(United States) Meredith McGrath	6–7^{(6–8)}, 6–7^{(4–7)}
Loss	3–7	May 1994	Berlin, Germany	Clay	(Germany) Steffi Graf	6–7^{(6–8)}, 4–6
Loss	3–8	Jul 1994	Palermo, Italy	Clay	(Romania) Irina Spîrlea	4–6, 6–1, 6–7^{(5–7)}
Loss	3–9	Nov 1994	Quebec City, Canada	Carpet (i)	(Bulgaria) Katerina Maleeva	3–6, 3–6
Win	4–9	Feb 1995	Oklahoma City, U.S.	Hard (i)	(Russia) Elena Likhovtseva	6–1, 6–2
Win	5–9	Nov 1995	Quebec City, Canada	Hard (i)	(Belgium) Dominique Monami	7–6^{(7–5)}, 6–2
Win	6–9	Feb 1996	Oklahoma City, U.S.	Hard (i)	(South Africa) Amanda Coetzer	6–3, 6–2
Win	7–9	Oct 1997	Quebec City, Canada	Hard (i)	(Belgium) Dominique Van Roost	6–4, 6–7^{(4–7)}, 7–5

=== Doubles (9 wins - 10 losses) ===
Legend
Grand Slam
WTA Tour Championship
Tier I
Tier II
Tier III
Tier IV & V

Result	W/L	Date	Tournament	Surface	Partner	Opponents	Score
Win	1–0	Apr 1989	Tampa, U.S.	Clay	(Hungary) Andrea Temesvári	(United States) Elise Burgin (South Africa) Rosalyn Fairbank	7–6^{(8–6)}, 6–4
Loss	1–1	Jul 1989	Arcachon, France	Clay	(Argentina) Mercedes Paz	(Italy) Sandra Cecchini (Argentina) Patricia Tarabini	3–6, 6–7^{(5–7)}
Loss	1–2	Nov 1990	Nashville, U.S.	Hard (i)	(Netherlands) Caroline Vis	(United States) Kathy Jordan (Soviet Union) Larisa Neiland	1–6, 2–6
Win	2–2	May 1993	Taranto, Italy	Clay	(United States) Debbie Graham	(Czech Republic) Petra Langrová (Argentina) Mercedes Paz	6–0, 6–4
Loss	2–3	May 1993	Berlin, Germany	Clay	(United States) Debbie Graham	(United States) Gigi Fernández (Belarus) Natasha Zvereva	1–6, 3–6
Loss	2–4	Jul 1993	Palermo, Italy	Clay	(Italy) Silvia Farina Elia	(Austria) Karin Kschwendt (Ukraine) Natalia Medvedeva	4–6, 6–7^{(4–7)}
Loss	2–5	May 1994	Rome, Italy	Clay	(Argentina) Gabriela Sabatini	(United States) Gigi Fernández (Belarus) Natasha Zvereva	1–6, 3–6
Loss	2–6	Nov 1994	Philadelphia, U.S.	Carpet (i)	(Argentina) Gabriela Sabatini	(United States) Gigi Fernández (Belarus) Natasha Zvereva	6–4, 4–6, 2–6
Win	3–6	Feb 1995	Chicago, United States	Carpet (i)	(Argentina) Gabriela Sabatini	(United States) Tami Whitlinger Jones (United States) Marianne Werdel	5–7, 7–6^{(7–4)}, 6–4
Loss	3–7	Feb 1995	Oklahoma City, U.S.	Hard (i)	(United States) Katrina Adams	(United States) Nicole Arendt (Italy) Laura Golarsa	4–6, 3–6
Win	4–7	Aug 1995	Toronto, Canada	Hard	(Argentina) Gabriela Sabatini	(Switzerland) Martina Hingis (Croatia) Iva Majoli	4–6, 6–0, 6–3
Loss	4–8	Sep 1995	US Open	Hard	(Australia) Rennae Stubbs	(United States) Gigi Fernández (Belarus) Natasha Zvereva	5–7, 3–6
Loss	4–9	Oct 1995	Leipzig, Germany	Carpet (i)	(Netherlands) Caroline Vis	(United States) Meredith McGrath (Latvia) Larisa Neiland	4–6, 4–6
Win	5–9	Feb 1996	Oklahoma City, U.S.	Hard (i)	(United States) Chanda Rubin	(United States) Katrina Adams (United States) Debbie Graham	6–3, 6–2
Win	6–9	Mar 1996	Indian Wells, U.S.	Hard	(United States) Chanda Rubin	(France) Julie Halard-Decugis (France) Nathalie Tauziat	6–1, 6–4
Win	7–9	May 1996	Hamburg, Germany	Clay	(Spain) Arantxa Sánchez Vicario	(United States) Gigi Fernández (Switzerland) Martina Hingis	4–6, 7–6^{(12–10)}, 6–4
Win	8–9	Jun 1996	Rosmalen, Netherlands	Grass	(Latvia) Larisa Neiland	(Netherlands) Kristie Boogert (Czech Republic) Helena Suková	6–4, 7–6^{(9–7)}
Win	9–9	Oct 1996	Quebec City, Canada	Hard (i)	(United States) Debbie Graham	(United States) Amy Frazier (United States) Kimberly Po	6–1, 6–4
Loss	9–10	Feb 1997	Hannover, Germany	Carpet (i)	(Latvia) Larisa Neiland	(United States) Nicole Arendt (Netherlands) Manon Bollegraf	6–4, 3–6, 6–7^{(4–7)}

== ITF finals ==
=== Singles (3–2) ===
$50,000 tournaments
$25,000 tournaments
$10,000 tournaments

Result	No.	Date	Tournament	Surface	Opponent	Score
Win	1.	5 January 1987	Chicago, United States	Hard	(United States) Anne Grousbeck	6–4, 6–3
Loss	2.	27 July 1987	Neumünster, West Germany	Clay	(France) Julie Halard-Decugis	2–6, 4–6
Win	3.	6 February 1994	Midland, United States	Hard	(United States) Meredith McGrath	6–2, 1–0 Ret.
Loss	4.	5 February 1995	Midland, United States	Hard	(United States) Chanda Rubin	5–7, 4–6
Loss	5.	8 May 2007	Palm Beach, United States	Clay	(Paraguay) Rossana de los Ríos	5–7, 4–6
Win	6.	9 June 2007	Surbiton, United Kingdom	Grass	(Japan) Ayumi Morita	4–6, 6–4, 7–6^{(7–5)}

=== Doubles (1–1) ===
Result	No.	Date	Tournament	Surface	Partner	Opponents	Score
Loss	1.	17 August 1987	Manhasset, United States	Clay	(Netherlands) Marianne van der Torre	(Israel) Ilana Berger (United States) Jane Thomas	4–6, 1–6
Win	2.	5 February 1995	Midland, United States	Hard	(United States) Chanda Rubin	(United States) Laxmi Poruri (United States) Varalee Sureephong	6–3, 6–2

== Grand Slam singles performance timeline ==
Key
W	F	SF	QF	#R	RR	Q#	DNQ	A	NH

(W) winner; (F) finalist; (SF) semifinalist; (QF) quarterfinalist; (#R) rounds 4, 3, 2, 1; (RR) round-robin stage; (Q#) qualification round; (DNQ) did not qualify; (A) absent; (NH) not held; (SR) strike rate (events won / competed); (W–L) win–loss record.

Tournament	1987	1988	1989	1990	1991	1992	1993	1994	1995	1996	1997	1998	1999	Career SR
Australian Open	A	1R	4R	2R	1R	1R	A	A	4R	4R	2R	A	A	0 / 8
French Open	A	4R	1R	2R	1R	3R	4R	3R	2R	3R	3R	1R	1R	0 / 12
Wimbledon	A	1R	1R	4R	4R	1R	3R	2R	QF	3R	3R	A	A	0 / 10
US Open	1R	1R	1R	1R	2R	3R	3R	1R	QF	2R	2R	A	A	0 / 11
SR	0 / 1	0 / 4	0 / 4	0 / 4	0 / 4	0 / 4	0 / 3	0 / 3	0 / 4	0 / 4	0 / 1	0 / 1	0 / 1	0 / 41

== See also ==
- Fastest recorded tennis serves
