= Angelique Olivier =

French tennis player

- Country (sports): France
- Born: 12 June 1975 (age 49)
- Prize money: $71,077

Singles
- Career record: 100–90
- Career titles: 1 ITF
- Highest ranking: No. 151 (1 February 1993)

Doubles
- Career record: 28–43
- Career titles: 1 ITF
- Highest ranking: 210 (8 August 1994)

Angelique Olivier (born 12 June 1975) is a former tennis player from France.

During her professional career from 1991 to 1995, she won two titles on the ITF Women's Circuit. Olivier received a wild-card entry into the French Open in 1992, 1993 and 1994. On the WTA Tour, she also received a wild-card entry into the 1994 Open Gaz de France tournament and reached the main draw of the 1994 Australian Tasmanian International as a qualifier.

== Career ==
On 1 February 1993, Olivier reached her highest singles ranking of world number 151. Her highest doubles ranking came on 8 August 1994, when she became world number 210.

In Portugal on 10 February 1992, Olivier defeated compatriot Axelle Thomas to win the singles title at the $10k Carvoeiro tournament. On 5 December 1994, she partnered with Elena Wagner to win the doubles title at the $50k Cergy-Pontois tournament in France.

== ITF finals ==
Legend
$50,000 tournaments
$25,000 tournaments
$10,000 tournaments

=== Singles (1–4) ===
Result	No.	Date	Tournament	Surface	Opponent	Score
Loss	1.	25 March 1991	Supetar, Yugoslavia	Clay	(Romania) Ruxandra Dragomir	4–6, 6–4, 0–6
Win	1.	10 February 1992	Carvoeiro, Portugal	Hard	(France) Axelle Thomas	7–5, 5–7, 7–6
Loss	2.	24 February 1992	Valencia, Spain	Clay	(Italy) Francesca Romano	7–5, 1–6, 4–6
Loss	3.	26 October 1992	Madeira, Portugal	Hard	(France) Sarah Pitkowski-Malcor	3–6, 6–3, 1–6
Loss	4.	28 March 1994	Moulins, France	Hard	(France) Sarah Pitkowski-Malcor	5–7, 4–6

=== Doubles (1–3) ===
Result	No.	Date	Tournament	Surface	Partner	Opponents	Score
Loss	1.	3 April 1994	Moulins, France	Clay	(Germany) Katja Oeljeklaus	(Sweden) Maria Lindström (Sweden) Maria Strandlund	6–3, 6–7, 0–6
Loss	2.	10 April 1994	Limoges, France	Clay	(Austria) Heidi Sprung	(France) Isabelle Demongeot (Sweden) Maria Strandlund	2–6, 2–6
Win	1.	11 December 1994	Cergy-Pontoise, France	Hard (i)	(Bulgaria) Elena Wagner	(Czech Republic) Kateřina Šišková (Czech Republic) Eva Melicharová	6–1, 6–4
Loss	3.	9 October 1995	Saint-Raphaël, France	Clay	(France) Pascale Etchemendy	(France) Amélie Mauresmo (France) Berangère Quillot	3–6, 6–7
