= Sybille Niox-Château =

French tennis player (born 1969)

- Full name: Sybille Niox-Château
- Country (sports): France
- Born: 19 October 1969 (age 55); Boulogne-Billancourt, Paris, France
- Retired: 1994
- Prize money: $122,425

Singles
- Career record: 112-125
- Career titles: 1 ITF
- Highest ranking: No. 94 (11 May 1992)

Grand Slam singles results
- Australian Open: 1R (1988, 1989, 1992)
- French Open: 2R (1987, 1991)
- Wimbledon: 1R (1992)
- US Open: 1R (1991)

Doubles
- Career record: 15-37
- Career titles: 1 ITF
- Highest ranking: No. 217 (17 July 1989)

Grand Slam doubles results
- French Open: 2R (1991)

Sybille Niox-Château (born 19 October 1969) is a former professional tennis player from France.

== Biography ==
Niox-Château, who was born in Paris as daughter of Nicole Niox-Château, is the niece of Italian fashion designer Sergio Tacchini.

She won the Orange Bowl (under 16s) tournament in 1985.

On her grand slam main draw debut at the 1986 French Open she lost in the first round to Nathalie Tauziat, 7–9 in the third set. She went on to appear at all four grand slam tournaments and twice made the second round of the French Open.

One of her best performances on the WTA Tour came at Aix-En-Provence in 1988 when she beat fourth seed Arantxa Sanchez Vicario to make the round of 16. She made one WTA Tour quarter-final, at the 1992 Belgian Open, after which she reached her career best ranking of 94 in the world.

Based in Miami, she is married to former French Davis Cup player Jean-Philippe Fleurian.

== ITF finals ==
=== Singles (1–2) ===
Legend
$25,000 tournaments
$10,000 tournaments

Result	No.	Date	Tournament	Surface	Opponent	Score
Loss	1.	27 April 1987	Sutton, United Kingdom	Hard	(Spain) María José Llorca	4–6, 6–4, 5–7
Loss	2.	23 July 1990	Milan, Italy	Clay	(Italy) Francesca Romano	4–6, 3–6
Win	3.	17 June 1991	Modena, Italy	Clay	(Paraguay) Rossana de los Ríos	6–0, 6–1

=== Doubles (1–0) ===
Result	No.	Date	Tournament	Surface	Partner	Opponents	Score
Win	1.	25 November 1991	Porto Alegre, Brazil	Clay	(Spain) Silvia Ramón-Cortés	(Brazil) Luciana Corsato-Owsianka (Brazil) Andrea Vieira	6–4, 6–3
