= Julie Halard-Decugis =

French tennis player (born 1970)

- Country (sports): France
- Residence: Pully, Switzerland
- Born: 10 September 1970 (age 55) Versailles, France
- Height: 1.73 m (5 ft 8 in)
- Turned pro: 1986
- Retired: 2000
- Plays: Right-handed (two handed-backhand)
- Prize money: US$ 3,081,132

Singles
- Career record: 386–233
- Career titles: 12
- Highest ranking: No. 7 (14 February 2000)

Grand Slam singles results
- Australian Open: QF (1993, 2000)
- French Open: QF (1994)
- Wimbledon: 4R (1992)
- US Open: 4R (1999)

Other tournaments
- Tour Finals: 1R (1999, 2000)
- Olympic Games: 3R (2000)

Doubles
- Career record: 253–156
- Career titles: 15
- Highest ranking: No. 1 (11 September 2000)

Grand Slam doubles results
- Australian Open: QF (2000)
- French Open: SF (1994, 2000)
- Wimbledon: F (2000)
- US Open: W (2000)

Other doubles tournaments
- Tour Finals: QF (2000)
- Olympic Games: QF (2000)

Mixed doubles
- Career record: 5–9
- Career titles: 0

Grand Slam mixed doubles results
- Australian Open: QF (1996)
- French Open: 3R (1995)
- Wimbledon: 3R (2000)
- US Open: 1R (1998)

Julie Halard-Decugis (born 10 September 1970) is a French former professional tennis player.

== Tennis career ==
Halard-Decugis lived in La Baule, France, during the initial stages of her career and later moved to Pully, Switzerland. She turned professional in 1986. She won the French Open junior singles title in 1988 and was the Wimbledon junior singles runner-up in 1987. She retired from the WTA Tour tennis circuit at the end of the 2000 season. Her highest WTA Tour singles and doubles rankings was number seven and number one respectively. She had been coached by Arnaud Decugis since 1989.

Halard-Decugis won her first WTA Tour singles title in Puerto Rico. She enjoyed her best season in 1996, when she won her first WTA Tour Tier II singles title in Paris and finished the year with a career-high season-ending singles ranking of No. 15 and as the No. 1 singles player from France. This occurred despite the fact that her playing schedule in the second half of 1996 was curtailed because of a wrist injury sustained during the Fed Cup semifinal match against Spain. She only played two tournaments in late 1997 because of injuries.

By winning the singles title in Rosmalen in 1998, she became the 20th player to have won singles titles on all four surfaces in the Open Era. Halard also won the singles and doubles titles in Pattaya that year, and broke into the top 10 singles ranking in August 1999, becoming the fifth Frenchwoman after Françoise Dürr, Mary Pierce, Nathalie Tauziat and Amélie Mauresmo to do so. In 1999, she won WTA Tour singles titles in Auckland and Birmingham and was runner-up on three other occasions. Between 15 November 1999 and 9 January 2000, Julie Halard, Nathalie Tauziat, Amélie Mauresmo and Mary Pierce were all ranked inside the singles top 10, the first time France had four players ranked among the singles top 10.

2000 was to be the final and perhaps the finest year of Halard's professional playing career. She reached the Australian Open singles quarterfinal for the second time, captured the second WTA Tour Tier II title of her career in Eastbourne and reached her career-high singles ranking of No. 7 in February. Halard was also runner-up in Tokyo's Princess Cup in October and won the doubles title with Ai Sugiyama. The following week, she won both the singles and doubles titles at the Japan Open in Tokyo, saving three match points in the final to defeat the defending champion Amy Frazier.

On her 30th birthday, Halard won the 2000 US Open women's doubles title with Ai Sugiyama, her only Grand Slam title as a professional. The pair also reached the final at Wimbledon, the semifinal at the French Open and the quarterfinal at the Australian Open that year. Halard-Decugis won nine other doubles titles in 2000, five of them with Sugiyama, and became the first Frenchwoman to attain the No. 1 doubles ranking in the Open Era. Halard-Decugis represented her country in the Federation Cup Fed Cup from 1990 to 2000 and in the Olympic Games in 1992 and 2000.

== Personal life ==
She married her coach, Arnaud Decugis, on 22 September 1995. Arnaud Decugis is the great nephew of Max Decugis, a leading tennis player from France during the early 20th century. The couple have three children

== Grand Slam finals ==
=== Doubles: 2 (1 title, 1 runner-up) ===
Result	Year	Championship	Surface	Partner	Opponents	Score
Loss	2000	Wimbledon	Grass	(Japan) Ai Sugiyama	(United States) Serena Williams (United States) Venus Williams	3–6, 2–6
Win	2000	US Open	Hard	(Japan) Ai Sugiyama	(Zimbabwe) Cara Black (Russia) Elena Likhovtseva	6–0, 1–6, 6–1

== WTA career finals ==
=== Singles: 21 (12 titles, 9 runner-ups) ===
Legend
Grand Slam tournaments
Virginia Slims
Tier I
Tier II
Tier III
Tier IV & V

Result	W/L	Date	Tournament	Surface	Opponent	Score
Loss	0–1	Oct 1987	Athens Open, Greece	Clay	(Bulgaria) Katerina Maleeva	0–6, 1–6
Loss	0–2	Aug 1991	Albuquerque, U.S.	Hard	(United States) Gigi Fernández	0–6, 2–6
Win	1–2	Oct 1991	San Juan Open, Puerto Rico	Hard	(South Africa) Amanda Coetzer	7–5, 7–5
Win	2–2	Apr 1992	Taranto Trophy, Italy	Clay	(Switzerland) Emanuela Zardo	6–0, 7–5
Loss	2–3	Feb 1994	Paris Indoors, France	Carpet (i)	(United States) Martina Navratilova	5–7, 3–6
Win	3–3	Apr 1994	Taranto, Italy	Clay	(Romania) Irina Spîrlea	6–2, 6–3
Win	4–3	May 1995	Prague Open, Czech Republic	Clay	(Czech Republic) Ludmila Richterová	6–4, 6–4
Win	5–3	Jan 1996	Hobart International, Australia	Hard	(Japan) Mana Endo	6–1, 6–2
Win	6–3	Feb 1996	Paris, France	Carpet (i)	(Croatia) Iva Majoli	7–5, 7–6^{(7–4)}
Loss	6–4	Feb 1996	Linz Open, Austria	Carpet (i)	(Belgium) Sabine Appelmans	2–6, 4–6
Loss	6–5	May 1998	Internationaux de Strasbourg, France	Clay	(Romania) Irina Spîrlea	6–7^{(5–7)}, 3–6
Win	7–5	Jun 1998	Rosmalen Championships, Netherlands	Grass	(Netherlands) Miriam Oremans	6–3, 6–4
Win	8–5	Nov 1998	Pattaya Open, Thailand	Hard	(China) Li Fang	6–1, 6–2
Win	9–5	Jan 1999	Auckland Open, New Zealand	Hard	(Belgium) Dominique Monami	6–4, 6–1
Loss	9–6	Apr 1999	Bol Ladies Open, Croatia	Clay	(United States) Corina Morariu	2–6, 0–6
Loss	9–7	May 1999	German Open, Berlin	Clay	(Switzerland) Martina Hingis	0–6, 1–6
Win	10–7	Jun 1999	Birmingham Classic, UK	Grass	(France) Nathalie Tauziat	6–2, 3–6, 6–4
Loss	10–8	Aug 1999	Los Angeles Classic, U.S.	Hard	(United States) Serena Williams	1–6, 4–6
Win	11–8	Jun 2000	Eastbourne International, UK	Grass	(Belgium) Dominique Monami	7–6^{(7–4)}, 6–4
Loss	11–9	Oct 2000	Tokyo Cup, Japan	Hard	(United States) Serena Williams	5–7, 1–6
Win	12–9	Oct 2000	Tokyo Championships, Japan	Hard	(United States) Amy Frazier	5–7, 7–5, 6–4

=== Doubles: 25 (15 titles, 10 runner-ups) ===
Result	W/L	Date	Tournament	Surface	Partner	Opponents	Score
Loss	0–1	Sep 1991	Clarins Open Paris, France	Clay	(France) Alexia Dechaume	(Czechoslovakia) Petra Langrová (Czechoslovakia) Radka Zrubáková	4–6, 4–6
Loss	0–2	Apr 1994	Barcelona Open, Spain	Clay	(France) Nathalie Tauziat	(Latvia) Larisa Neiland (Spain) Arantxa Sánchez Vicario	2–6, 4–6
Win	1–2	Aug 1994	Los Angeles Classic, US	Hard	(France) Nathalie Tauziat	(Czech Republic) Jana Novotná (United States) Lisa Raymond	6–1, 0–6, 6–1
Win	2–2	Sep 1994	Tokyo International, Japan	Hard	(Spain) Arantxa Sánchez Vicario	(United States) Amy Frazier (Japan) Rika Hiraki	6–1, 0–6, 6–1
Win	3–2	Jan 1996	Auckland Open, New Zealand	Hard	(Belgium) Els Callens	(Canada) Jill Hetherington (Australia) Kristine Kunce	6–0, 6–1
Loss	3–3	Feb 1996	Paris Indoors, France	Carpet (i)	(France) Nathalie Tauziat	(Netherlands) Kristie Boogert (Czech Republic) Jana Novotná	4–6, 3–6
Loss	3–4	Mar 1996	Indian Wells Open, US	Hard	(France) Nathalie Tauziat	(United States) Chanda Rubin (Netherlands) Brenda Schultz	1–6, 4–6
Loss	3–5	Sep 1997	Tokyo Cup, Japan	Hard	(United States) Chanda Rubin	(United States) Monica Seles (Japan) Ai Sugiyama	1–6, 0–6
Loss	3–6	Jan 1998	Auckland Open, New Zealand	Hard	(Slovakia) Janette Husárová	(Japan) Nana Miyagi (Thailand) Tamarine Tanasugarn	6–7^{1}, 4–6
Loss	3–7	Jan 1998	Hobart International, Australia	Hard	(Slovakia) Janette Husárová	(Spain) Virginia Ruano Pascual (Argentina) Paola Suárez	6–7^{6}, 3–6
Win	4–7	Jun 1998	Birmingham Classic, UK	Grass	(Belgium) Els Callens	(United States) Lisa Raymond (Australia) Rennae Stubbs	2–6, 6–4, 6–4
Win	5–7	Nov 1998	Pattaya Open, Thailand	Hard	(Belgium) Els Callens	(Japan) Rika Hiraki (Poland) Aleksandra Olsza	3–6, 6–2, 6–2
Loss	5–8	Oct 1999	Kremlin Cup, Russia	Carpet (i)	(Germany) Anke Huber	(United States) Lisa Raymond (Australia) Rennae Stubbs	0–6, 1–6
Win	6–8	Jan 2000	Gold Coast Hardcourts, Australia	Hard	(Russia) Anna Kournikova	(Belgium) Sabine Appelmans (Italy) Rita Grande	6–3, 6–0
Win	7–8	Jan 2000	Sydney International, Australia	Hard	(Japan) Ai Sugiyama	(Switzerland) Martina Hingis (France) Mary Pierce	6–0, 6–3
Win	8–8	Feb 2000	Paris Indoors, France	Carpet (i)	(France) Sandrine Testud	(France) Émilie Loit (Sweden) Åsa Carlsson	3–6, 6–3, 6–4
Win	9–8	Mar 2000	Miami Masters, US	Hard	(Japan) Ai Sugiyama	(United States) Nicole Arendt (Netherlands) Manon Bollegraf	4–6, 7–5, 6–4
Win	10–8	May 2000	Bol Ladies Open, Croatia	Clay	(United States) Corina Morariu	(Slovenia) Tina Križan (Slovenia) Katarina Srebotnik	6–2, 6–2
Loss	10–9	Jun 2000	Wimbledon, UK	Grass	(Japan) Ai Sugiyama	(United States) Serena Williams (United States) Venus Williams	3–6, 2–6
Loss	10–10	Aug 2000	Rogers Cup Montreal, Canada	Hard	(Japan) Ai Sugiyama	(Switzerland) Martina Hingis (France) Nathalie Tauziat	3–6, 6–3, 4–6
Win	11–10	Aug 2000	Connecticut Open, US	Hard	(Japan) Ai Sugiyama	(Spain) Virginia Ruano Pascual (Argentina) Paola Suárez	6–4, 5–7, 6–2
Win	12–10	Aug 2000	US Open	Hard	(Japan) Ai Sugiyama	(Zimbabwe) Cara Black (Russia) Elena Likhovtseva	6–0, 1–6, 6–1
Win	13–10	Oct 2000	Tokyo Cup, Japan	Hard	(Japan) Ai Sugiyama	(Japan) Nana Miyagi (Argentina) Paola Suárez	6–0, 6–2
Win	14–10	Oct 2000	Tokyo Championships, Japan	Hard	(United States) Corina Morariu	(Slovenia) Tina Križan (Slovenia) Katarina Srebotnik	6–1, 6–2
Win	15–10	Oct 2000	Kremlin Cup, Russia	Carpet (i)	(Japan) Ai Sugiyama	(Switzerland) Martina Hingis (Russia) Anna Kournikova	4–6, 6–4, 7–6^{5}

== ITF Circuit finals ==
=== Singles: 2 (2–0) ===
Legend
$50,000 tournaments
$25,000 tournaments
$10,000 tournaments

Outcome	No.	Date	Tournament	Surface	Opponent	Score
Winner	1.	13 July 1987	ITF Erlangen, West Germany	Clay	(West Germany) Wiltrud Probst	4–6, 6–4, 6–2
Winner	2.	27 July 1987	ITF Neumünster, West Germany	Clay	(Netherlands) Brenda Schultz-McCarthy	6–2, 6–4

=== Doubles: 4 (2–2) ===
Outcome	No.	Date	Tournament	Surface	Partner	Opponents	Score
Winner	1.	20 July 1987	ITF Vaihingen, West Germany	Clay	(France) Virginie Paquet	(Czechoslovakia) Hana Fukárková (Czechoslovakia) Denisa Krajčovičová	6–4, 6–3
Winner	2.	3 December 1990	ITF Le Havre, France	Clay	(France) Agnès Zugasti	(Netherlands) Gaby Coorengel (Netherlands) Amy van Buuren	6–3, 6–0
Runner-up	1.	7 December 1992	ITF Val-d'Oise, France	Hard (i)	(Belgium) Sabine Appelmans	(France) Isabelle Demongeot (France) Catherine Suire	5–7, 4–6
Runner-up	2.	7 December 1997	ITF Cergy-Pontoise, France	Hard (i)	(France) Anne-Gaëlle Sidot	(Netherlands) Kristie Boogert (Netherlands) Miriam Oremans	5–7, 4–6

== Grand Slam performance timelines ==
Key
W	F	SF	QF	#R	RR	Q#	DNQ	A	NH

(W) winner; (F) finalist; (SF) semifinalist; (QF) quarterfinalist; (#R) rounds 4, 3, 2, 1; (RR) round-robin stage; (Q#) qualification round; (DNQ) did not qualify; (A) absent; (NH) not held; (SR) strike rate (events won / competed); (W–L) win–loss record.

=== Singles ===
Tournament	1987	1988	1989	1990	1991	1992	1993	1994	1995	1996	1997	1998	1999	2000	SR	W–L
Australian Open	A	2R	1R	3R	2R	1R	QF	2R	1R	3R	A	A	2R	QF	0 / 11	16–11
French Open	2R	2R	1R	3R	2R	3R	3R	QF	3R	2R	A	2R	4R	1R	0 / 13	20–13
Wimbledon	A	1R	2R	2R	2R	4R	1R	1R	1R	A	A	3R	3R	1R	0 / 11	10–11
US Open	3R	1R	2R	2R	2R	2R	2R	2R	2R	A	A	1R	4R	1R	0 / 12	12–12
Overall win–loss	3–2	2–4	2–4	6–4	4–4	6–4	7–4	6–4	3–4	3–2	0–0	3–3	9–4	4–4	0 / 47	58–47
Career statistics
Titles	0	0	0	0	1	1	0	1	1	3	0	1	2	2	12	
Finals	1	0	0	0	2	1	0	2	1	4	0	2	5	3	21	
Year-end ranking	62	75	118	41	20	27	29	21	51	20	–	22	9	15		

=== Doubles ===
Tournament	1987	1988	1989	1990	1991	1992	1993	1994	1995	1996	1997	1998	1999	2000	SR	W–L
Australian Open	A	1R	2R	2R	A	1R	1R	1R	2R	3R	A	A	3R	QF	0 / 10	10–10
French Open	A	1R	2R	1R	3R	2R	1R	SF	QF	3R	A	2R	1R	SF	0 / 12	18–12
Wimbledon	A	A	A	A	1R	1R	2R	3R	3R	A	A	QF	2R	F	0 / 8	14–8
US Open	A	A	A	A	1R	1R	1R	1R	QF	A	A	3R	3R	W	1 / 8	13–7
Overall win–loss	0–0	0–2	2–2	1–2	2–3	1–4	1–4	6–4	9–4	4–2	0–0	6–3	5–4	18–3	1 / 38	55–37

=== Head-to-head records ===
- Arantxa Sánchez Vicario 4—8
- Dominique Monami 2—2
- Serena Williams 0—4
- Martina Hingis 0—5
- Venus Williams 1—1
- Anna Kournikova 1—1
- Elena Dementieva 1—0
- Jelena Dokic 1—0
- Steffi Graf 1—9
- Lindsay Davenport 2—9
- Mary Pierce 3-0
