= Catherine Mothes-Jobkel =

French tennis player

- Country (sports): France
- Born: 7 June 1970 (age 55) Bègles, France
- Retired: 1997
- Prize money: $174,930

Singles
- Career record: 181–95
- Career titles: 9 ITF
- Highest ranking: No. 67 (21 June 1993)

Grand Slam singles results
- French Open: 2R (1989, 1995)
- US Open: 2R (1991)

Doubles
- Career record: 0–0
- Career titles: 0

Catherine Mothes-Jobkel (born 7 June 1970 in Bègles) is a former tennis player from France who competed on the WTA Tour from 1987 to 1997. She turned professional in 1989 and reached a career-high ranking of world No. 67, in June 1993. During her career, she competed in the French Open eight times, twice reaching the second round, and in the US Open twice, reaching the second round in 1991. In 1993, she reached the semifinals of the Belgian Open.

== ITF finals ==
Legend
$25,000 tournaments
$10,000 tournaments

=== Singles: 14 (9–5) ===
Result	No.	Date	Tournament	Surface	Opponent	Score
Loss	1.	19 January 1987	ITF Bayonne, France	Carpet (i)	(Poland) Iwona Kuczyńska	6–2, 3–6, 4–6
Loss	2.	29 February 1988	ITF Rocafort, Spain	Clay	(Spain) Conchita Martínez	0–6, 3–6
Loss	3.	7 March 1988	ITF Valencia, Spain	Clay	(Italy) Silvia La Fratta	2–6, 2–6
Win	4.	22 August 1988	ITF Rebecq, Belgium	Clay	(West Germany) Maja Živec-Škulj	2–6, 6–1, 6–0
Win	5.	29 August 1988	ITF Nivelles, Belgium	Clay	(Hungary) Réka Szikszay	6–3, 6–1
Win	6.	31 July 1989	ITF Vigo, Spain	Clay	(Italy) Simona Isidori	6–4, 6–3
Win	7.	14 May 1990	ITF Cascais, Portugal	Clay	(Brazil) Claudia Chabalgoity	6–3, 6–2
Win	8.	30 July 1990	ITF Vigo, Spain	Clay	(Spain) María José Llorca	4–6, 6–1, 6–1
Win	9.	10 June 1991	ITF Mantua, Italy	Clay	(Germany) Christiane Hofmann	6–1, 6–0
Win	10.	5 August 1991	ITF Vigo, Spain	Clay	(Spain) Eva Bes	6–3, 6–0
Win	11.	20 March 1994	ITF Reims, France	Clay (i)	(Bulgaria) Elena Pampoulova	6–1, 6–2
Loss	12.	18 July 1994	ITF Bilbao, Spain	Clay	(Netherlands) Maaike Koutstaal	3–6, 1–6
Loss	13.	24 March 1996	ITF Reims, France	Clay (i)	(France) Caroline Dhenin	6–3, 1–6, 2–6
Win	14.	2 September 1996	ITF Spoleto, Italy	Clay	(India) Nirupama Sanjeev	7–5, 6–2
