= Noëlle van Lottum =

Dutch former professional tennis player (born 1972)

- Country (sports): Netherlands; France
- Born: 12 June 1972 (age 53); Hoogland, Netherlands
- Height: 1.70 m (5 ft 7 in)
- Turned pro: 1987
- Retired: 1999
- Plays: Right-handed
- Prize money: $559,094

Singles
- Career record: 195–196
- Career titles: 1 WTA, 4 ITF
- Highest ranking: No. 57 (11 January 1993)

Grand Slam singles results
- Australian Open: 2R (1992, 1997)
- French Open: 2R (1988, 1991, 1992, 1994)
- Wimbledon: 1R (1991, 1992, 1993, 1997)
- US Open: 3R (1992)

Doubles
- Career record: 139–148
- Career titles: 1 WTA, 7 ITF
- Highest ranking: No. 59 (21 September 1992)

Grand Slam doubles results
- Australian Open: 2R (1991, 1992, 1998, 1999)
- French Open: 3R (1992)
- Wimbledon: 2R (1992)
- US Open: 2R (1994)

Noëlle van Lottum (born 12 July 1972, Hoogland) is a Dutch-French coach and former professional tennis player active mostly in the 1990s.

Van Lottum was national youth champion both in the Netherlands and France. In terms of tennis nationality (which is only one country at a time), she switched from representing Netherlands to France before turning pro. She then played on the WTA Tour from 1987 until 1999, winning one singles and one doubles title. Her career-high singles ranking was World No. 57 (reached in January 1993) and her career-high doubles ranking was World No. 59 (reached in September 1992). With Virginie Buisson, she holds the record for the longest female match in the French Open; in the first round of the 1995 edition she lost to Buisson after 4 hours and 7 minutes.

Van Lottum has been the owner and director of a tennis school in the Netherlands—and since 2023 working as Head Women’s National Coach on youth development in the Montreal grounds of Tennis Canada.

She is the older sister of tennis player John van Lottum.

== WTA Tour finals ==
=== Singles 1 (1–0) ===
Legend: Before 2009	Legend: Starting in 2009
Grand Slam (0/0)
WTA Championships (0/0)
Tier I (0/0)	Premier Mandatory (0/0)
Tier II (0/0)	Premier 5 (0/0)
Tier III (0/0)	Premier (0/0)
Tier IV & V (1/0)	International (0/0)

Result	W/L	Date	Tournament	Surface	Opponent	Score
Win	1–0	Feb 1992	Wellington, New Zealand	Hard	(United States) Donna Faber	6–4, 6–0

=== Doubles 4 (1–3) ===
Result	W/L	Date	Tournament	Surface	Partner	Opponents	Score
Loss	0–1	Jul 1992	Prague, Czech Republic	Clay	(Czech Republic) Eva Švíglerová	(Austria) Karin Kschwendt (Austria) Petra Schwarz	4–6, 6–2, 5–7
Loss	0–2	Sep 1992	Paris, France	Clay	(Australia) Rachel McQuillan	(Italy) Sandra Cecchini (Argentina) Patricia Tarabini	5–7, 1–6
Win	1–2	Apr 1994	Taranto, Italy	Clay	(Romania) Irina Spîrlea	(Italy) Sandra Cecchini (France) Isabelle Demongeot	6–3, 2–6, 6–1
Loss	1–3	Oct 1996	Surabaya, Indonesia	Hard	(Slovenia) Tina Križan	(France) Alexandra Fusai (Australia) Kerry-Anne Guse	4–6, 4–6

== ITF Circuit finals ==
Legend
$100,000 tournaments
$75,000 tournaments
$50,000 tournaments
$25,000 tournaments
$10,000 tournaments

=== Singles (4–1) ===
Result	No.	Date	Tournament	Surface	Opponent	Score
Win	1.	20 February 1989	Buenos Aires, Argentina	Clay	(Argentina) Florencia Labat	7–5, 6–4
Win	2.	17 September 1995	Karlovy Vary, Czech Republic	Clay	(Czech Republic) Adriana Gerši	6–2, 6–3
Loss	3.	16 July 1996	Budapest, Hungary	Clay	(Belgium) Stephanie Devillé	2–6, 2–6
Win	4.	3 November 1996	Poitiers, France	Hard (i)	(France) Amélie Cocheteux	1–6, 6–3, 6–2
Win	5.	13 July 1997	Puchheim, Germany	Clay	(Hungary) Virág Csurgó	6–0, 6–2

=== Doubles (7–8) ===
Result	No.	Date	Tournament	Surface	Partner	Opponents	Score
Loss	1.	27 March 1989	Moulins, France	Hard	(Netherlands) Mara Eijkenboom	(France) Catherine Tanvier (France) Sandrine Testud	4–6, 3–6
Win	2.	13 November 1989	Santiago, Chile	Clay	(Denmark) Sofie Albinus	(Brazil) Luciana Della Casa (Italy) Giulia Toschi	6–2, 6–2
Win	3.	12 November 1990	Mount Gambier, South Australia	Hard	(Australia) Jo-Anne Faull	(Australia) Kerry-Anne Guse (Australia) Justine Hodder	7–5, 6–4
Loss	4.	11 February 1996	Mar del Plata, Argentina	Hard	(Austria) Marion Maruska	(Argentina) Laura Montalvo (Argentina) Paola Suárez	3–6, 1–6
Loss	5.	11 February 1996	Murcia, Spain	Clay	(Netherlands) Kim de Weille	(Germany) Silke Meier (Austria) Petra Schwarz	3–6, 3–6
Loss	6.	28 October 1996	Poitiers, France	Hard (i)	(Netherlands) Anique Snijders	(Belarus) Olga Barabanschikova (India) Nirupama Sanjeev	2–6, 3–6
Loss	7.	10 November 1996	Ramat Hasharon, Israel	Hard	(Netherlands) Anique Snijders	(Germany) Kirstin Freye (Netherlands) Seda Noorlander	2–6, 5–7
Loss	8.	8 December 1996	Cergy, France	Hard (i)	(Germany) Kirstin Freye	(United States) Angela Lettiere (United States) Meilen Tu	4–6, 6–2, 4–6
Loss	9.	9 March 1997	Rockford, United States	Hard	(Ukraine) Elena Brioukhovets	(United States) Janet Lee (Sweden) Maria Strandlund	6–7, 3–6
Win	10.	13 July 1997	Puchheim, Germany	Clay	(Germany) Kirstin Freye	(Argentina) María Fernanda Landa (Netherlands) Seda Noorlander	6–1, 6–2
Loss	11.	1 March 1998	Bushey, United Kingdom	Carpet (i)	(Germany) Kirstin Freye	(Australia) Trudi Musgrave (United Kingdom) Shirli-Ann Siddall	6–7, 6–4, 2–6
Win	12.	15 March 1998	Biel, Switzerland	Hard (i)	(Germany) Kirstin Freye	(Belgium) Nancy Feber (Slovenia) Tina Križan	6–3, 3–6, 7–6^{(7–4)}
Win	13.	26 April 1998	Espinho, Portugal	Carpet (i)	(Netherlands) Kim de Weille	(Germany) Kirstin Freye (Germany) Silke Meier	4–6, 6–3, 7–5
Win	14.	13 July 1998	Darmstadt, Germany	Clay	(Belgium) Laurence Courtois	(Hungary) Virág Csurgó (Hungary) Nóra Köves	7–5, 6–2
Win	15.	20 June 1999	Grado, Italy	Clay	(France) Lea Ghirardi	(Italy) Flavia Pennetta (United States) Tracy Almeda-Singian	1–6, 6–4, 6–4
