= Debbie Graham =

American tennis player (born 1970)

- Country (sports): United States
- Born: August 25, 1970 (age 55) Walnut Creek, California
- Plays: Right-handed
- College: Stanford
- Prize money: $862,123

Singles
- Career record: 175–60
- Career titles: 0
- Highest ranking: No. 35 (January 6, 1992)

Grand Slam singles results
- Australian Open: 2R (1993, 1994)
- French Open: 3R (1991)
- Wimbledon: 2R (1992)
- US Open: 2R (1990, 1991, 1996)

Doubles
- Career record: 206–163
- Career titles: 5 WTA, 6 ITF
- Highest ranking: No. 24 (January 31, 1994)

Grand Slam doubles results
- Australian Open: QF (1994, 2000)
- French Open: 3R (1993, 1998)
- Wimbledon: SF (1998)
- US Open: 3R (1993, 1998)

Debbie Graham or Debbie Graham Shaffer (born August 25, 1970) is a retired tennis player from the United States.

She was awarded the "Most Impressive Newcomer" by WTA in 1992. She was a "High Performance Coach" for women with the USTA at the USTA Training Center in Carson, California.

She is the director of Little Aces Tennis, where she is teaching children to play tennis with low compression balls, smaller rackets, and smaller nets.

Graham played college tennis for Stanford University. She won the Broderick Award (now the Honda Sports Award) as the nation's top collegiate tennis player in 1990. She was inducted into the Stanford Hall of Fame in 1997 for winning NCAAA singles her sophomore year and only losing one match on an undefeated team.

== WTA career finals ==
=== Singles: 1 (0–1) ===
Legend
Grand Slam
Tier I
Tier II
Tier III
Tier IV & V

Result	W-L	Date	Tournament	Surface	Opponent	Score
Loss	1–0	May 1993	Taranto, Italy	Clay	(Netherlands) Brenda Schultz	6–7, 2–6

=== Doubles: 9 (5–4) ===
Legend
Grand Slam	0
Tier I	0
Tier II	0
Tier III	1
Tier IV & V	4

Titles by surface
Hard	1
Clay	3
Grass	0
Carpet	1

Result	W-L	Date	Tournament	Surface	Partner	Opponents	Score
Loss	0–1	Jul 1989	Schenectady, United States	Hard	(United States) Sandra Birch	(Australia) Michelle Jaggard (United States) Hu Na	3–6, 2–6
Win	1–1	May 1993	Taranto, Italy	Clay	(Netherlands) Brenda Schultz	(Czech Republic) Petra Langrová (Argentina) Mercedes Paz	6–0, 6–4
Loss	1–2	May 1993	Berlin, Germany	Clay	(Netherlands) Brenda Schultz	(United States) Gigi Fernández (Belarus) Natalia Zvereva	1–6, 3–6
Win	2–2	Aug 1993	San Juan, Puerto Rico	Hard	(United States) Ann Grossman	(United States) Gigi Fernández (Australia) Rennae Stubbs	5–7, 7–5, 7–5
Loss	2–3	Sep 1993	Hong Kong	Hard	(United States) Marianne Werdel	(Germany) Karin Kschwendt (Australia) Rachel McQuillan	6–1, 6–7, 2–6
Loss	2–4	Feb 1996	Oklahoma City, United States	Hard (i)	(United States) Katrina Adams	(United States) Chanda Rubin (Netherlands) Brenda Schultz	4–6, 3–6
Win	3–4	May 1996	Budapest, Hungary	Clay	(United States) Katrina Adams	(Czech Republic) Radka Bobková (Czech Republic) Eva Melicharová	6–3, 7–6
Win	4–4	Oct 1996	Québec, Canada	Carpet (i)	(Netherlands) Brenda Schultz	(United States) Amy Frazier (United States) Kimberly Po	6–1, 6–4
Win	5–4	May 1997	Cardiff, Wales	Clay	(Australia) Kerry-Anne Guse	(United Kingdom) Julie Pullin (United Kingdom) Lorna Woodroffe	6–3, 6–4

Preceded by Andrea Strnadová	WTA Newcomer of the Year; 1992	Succeeded by Iva Majoli
