= Sandra Dopfer =

Austrian tennis player

- Full name: Sandra Heim-Dopfer
- Country (sports): Austria
- Born: 25 May 1970 (age 56) Lustenau, Austria
- Height: 1.73 m (5 ft 8 in)
- Prize money: $382,801

Singles
- Career record: 206–188
- Career titles: 6 ITF
- Highest ranking: 70 (29 August 1994)

Grand Slam singles results
- Australian Open: 1R (1993, 1994, 1995, 1997, 1998)
- French Open: 2R (1992, 1994)
- Wimbledon: 1R (1994, 1995, 1996, 1997)
- US Open: 3R (1996)

Doubles
- Career record: 26–54
- Career titles: 0
- Highest ranking: 102 (19 July 1993)

Grand Slam doubles results
- Australian Open: 2R (1993)
- French Open: 1R (1993, 1994)
- Wimbledon: —
- US Open: —

Team competitions
- Fed Cup: 0–1

Sandra Heim-Dopfer (born 25 May 1970) is a former Austrian tennis player. Her best Grand Slam result was making the third round of the 1996 US Open.

== Life ==
Heim-Dopfer was born on 25 May 1970 in Lustenau, Austria as Sandra Dopfer.

Heim-Dopfer won six singles titles on the ITF tour in her career. On 29 August 1994, she reached her best singles ranking of world number 70. On 19 July 1993, she peaked at world number 102 in the doubles rankings.

Heim-Dopfer made one appearance for the Austria Fed Cup team in July 1993. Her best Grand Slam result was in 1996, making the third round of that year's US Open.

After her tennis career, Heim-Dopfer worked for the charitable organisation Caritas Vorarlberg. In 2004, she married Michael Heim, an Austrian architect. They have two children.

During her career, Heim-Dopfer had learned about various healing methods as well as the power of mindfulness and she used several relaxation and visualisation techniques. In 2001, she started years of training in meditation and metaphysical healing and has been following her passion to help people ever since: She opened her meditation centre in Dornbirn, Austria in 2012.

== Results ==
=== ITF finals ===
==== Singles (6–4) ====
Legend $100,000 tournaments $75,000 tournaments $50,000 tournaments $25,000 tournaments $10,000 tournaments	Finals by surface Hard (0–1) Clay (6–3) Grass (0–0) Carpet (0–0)

Result	No.	Date	Tournament	Surface	Opponent	Score
Win	1.	20 June 1988	Bad Gastein, Austria	Clay	(Romania) Florentina Curpene	6–1, 7–6
Win	2.	2 April 1990	Turin, Italy	Clay	(Brazil) Cláudia Chabalgoity	6–2, ret.
Win	3.	20 April 1992	Bari, Italy	Clay	(Latvia) Agnese Blumberga	6–2, 6–3
Win	4.	28 June 1993	Stuttgart, Germany	Clay	(Italy) Federica Bonsignori	6–1, 6–0
Win	5.	6 September 1993	Spoleto, Italy	Clay	(Switzerland) Emanuela Zardo	6–4, 6–0
Loss	1.	1 August 1994	Sopot, Poland	Clay	(Belarus) Tatiana Ignatieva	6–2, 3–6, 2–6
Loss	2.	14 August 1995	Maribor, Slovenia	Clay	(Slovakia) Janette Husárová	6–7^{(5–7)}, 6–3, 4–6
Win	6.	2 October 1995	Lleida, Spain	Clay	(Spain) Mariam Ramón Climent	6–1, 6–1
Loss	3.	28 July 1997	Makarska, Croatia	Clay	(Croatia) Mirjana Lučić	1–6, 4–6
Loss	4.	6 October 1997	Sedona, United States	Hard	(Australia) Rachel McQuillan	3–6, 6–7^{(5–7)}

==== Doubles (0–1) ====
Legend $100,000 tournaments $75,000 tournaments $50,000 tournaments $25,000 tournaments $10,000 tournaments	Finals by surface Hard (0–0) Clay (0–1) Grass (0–0) Carpet (0–0)

Result	No.	Date	Tournament	Surface	Partner	Opponents	Score
Loss	1.	17 August 1992	Spoleto, Italy	Clay	(Germany) Maja Živec-Škulj	(Italy) Flora Perfetti (Italy) Gloria Pizzichini	6–1, 2–6, 1–6

=== Fed Cup participation ===
==== Singles ====
Edition	Stage	Date	Location	Against	Surface	Opponent	W/L	Score
1993 Federation Cup; World Group	1R	20 July 1993	Frankfurt, Germany	Denmark	Clay	(Denmark) Sofie Albinus	L	7–5, 2–6, 4–6
