= Linda Ferrando =

Italian tennis player

- Country (sports): Italy
- Born: 12 January 1966 (age 59)
- Height: 170 cm (5 ft 7 in)
- Turned pro: 1983
- Retired: 1995
- Prize money: $501,483

Singles
- Career record: 160–151
- Career titles: 3 ITF
- Highest ranking: No. 36 (11 April 1994)

Doubles
- Career record: 76–98
- Career titles: 1 WTA, 2 ITF
- Highest ranking: No. 33 (7 June 1993)

Linda Ferrando (born 12 January 1966) is a former Italian international tennis player.

She competed in the Fed Cup a number of times, from 1991 to 1993.

== WTA career finals ==
=== Doubles: 3 (1 title, 2 runner-ups) ===
Result	No.	Date	Tournament	Surface	Partner	Opponents	Score
Loss	1.	Jul 1988	Båstad Open, Sweden	Clay	(Italy) Silvia La Fratta	(Italy) Sandra Cecchini (Argentina) Mercedes Paz	0–6, 2–6
Loss	2.	Aug 1990	Schenectady, United States	Hard	(West Germany) Wiltrud Probst	(United States) Alysia May (Japan) Nana Miyagi	4–6, 7–5, 3–6
Win	3.	Sep 1992	Bayonne, France	Hard (i)	(Czechoslovakia) Petra Langrová	(West Germany) Claudia Kohde-Kilsch (United States) Stephanie Rehe	1–6, 6–3, 6–4

== ITF Circuit finals ==
$100,000 tournaments
$75,000 tournaments
$50,000 tournaments
$25,000 tournaments
$10,000 tournaments

=== Singles: 5 (3–2) ===
Result	No.	Date	Tournament	Surface	Opponent	Score
Win	1.	13 October 1986	ITF Rabac, Yugoslavia	Clay	(Socialist Federal Republic of Yugoslavia) Renata Šašak	6–2, 6–3
Loss	2.	20 April 1987	ITF Monte Viso, Italy	Clay	(Soviet Union) Natalia Medvedeva	1–6, 3–6
Win	3.	29 January 1990	ITF Midland, United States	Hard	(France) Mary Pierce	6–4, 6–1
Loss	4.	7 September 1992	ITF Arzachena, Italy	Clay	(Italy) Gloria Pizzichini	3–6, 4–6
Win	5.	16 August 1993	ITF Arzachena, Italy	Clay	(Australia) Kristin Godridge	6–4, 6–4

=== Doubles: 4 (2–2) ===
Result	No.	Date	Tournament	Surface	Partner	Opponents	Score
Win	1.	21 July 1986	ITF Subiaco, Italy	Hard	(Italy) Stefania Dalla Valle	(France) Nathalie Ballet (France) Karine Quentrec	6–2, 0–6, 6–1
Win	2.	13 April 1992	ITF Salerno, Italy	Hard	(Italy) Silvia Farina Elia	(Australia) Kirrily Sharpe (Australia) Angie Woolcock	6–1, 6–4
Loss	3.	7 September 1992	ITF Arzachena, Italy	Clay	(Italy) Silvia Farina Elia	(Italy) Laura Garrone (Italy) Laura Golarsa	4–6, 6–4, 4–6
Loss	4.	16 August 1993	ITF Arzachena, Italy	Clay	(Italy) Silvia Farina Elia	(Japan) Akiko Kijimuta (Japan) Naoko Kijimuta	0–6, 5–7
