= Ilva Trophy =

Defunct tennis tournament
- Event name: Taranto Open (1984); Italian Open (1985); Mantegazza Cup (1988–89); Ilva Trophy (1990–94)
- Tour: WTA Tour
- Founded: 1984
- Abolished: 1994
- Editions: 9
- Location: Taranto, Italy
- Category: Tier V (1990–92); Tier IV (1993–94)
- Surface: Clay / outdoor

The Ilva Trophy is a defunct WTA Tour affiliated women's tennis tournament played from 1984 to 1994, with the exception of 1986 and 1987. It was held in Taranto, Italy and played on outdoor clay courts. It was a Tier V tournaments from 1990 until 1992 and was promoted to Tier IV for its last two years.

== Finals ==
=== Singles ===
Year	Champion	Runner-up	Score
1984	(Italy) Sandra Cecchini	(Socialist Federal Republic of Yugoslavia) Sabrina Goleš	6–2, 7–5
1985	(Italy) Raffaella Reggi	(United States) Vicki Nelson	6–4, 6–4
1986 - 1987	not held		
1988	(Canada) Helen Kelesi	(Italy) Laura Garrone	6–1, 6–0
1989	(France) Karine Quentrec	(Italy) Cathy Caverzasio	6–3, 5–7, 6–3
1990	(Italy) Raffaella Reggi	(France) Alexia Dechaume	3–6, 6–0, 6–2
1991	(Switzerland) Emanuela Zardo	(Austria) Petra Ritter	7–5, 6–2
1992	(France) Julie Halard	(Switzerland) Emanuela Zardo	6–0, 7–5
1993	(Netherlands) Brenda Schultz	(United States) Debbie Graham	7–6^{(7–5)}, 6–2
1994	(France) Julie Halard	(Romania) Irina Spîrlea	6–2, 6–3

=== Doubles ===
Year	Champions	Runners-up	Score
1984	(Socialist Federal Republic of Yugoslavia) Sabrina Goleš (Austria) Petra Huber	(Soviet Union) Elena Eliseenko (Soviet Union) Natasha Reva	6–3, 6–3
1985	(Italy) Sandra Cecchini (Italy) Raffaella Reggi	(Italy) Patrizia Murgo (Italy) Barbara Romanò	1–6 6–4 6–3
1986 - 1987	not held		
1988	(West Germany) Andrea Betzner (West Germany) Claudia Porwik	(Italy) Laura Garrone (Canada) Helen Kelesi	6–1, 6–2
1989	(Socialist Federal Republic of Yugoslavia) Sabrina Goleš (Argentina) Mercedes Paz	(France) Sophie Amiach (France) Emmanuelle Derly	6–2, 6–2
1990	(Soviet Union) Elena Brioukhovets (Soviet Union) Eugenia Maniokova	(Italy) Silvia Farina (Italy) Rita Grande	7–6^{(7–4)}, 6–1
1991	(France) Alexia Dechaume (Argentina) Florencia Labat	(Italy) Laura Golarsa (United States) Ann Grossman	6–2, 7–5
1992	(South Africa) Amanda Coetzer (Argentina) Inés Gorrochategui	(Australia) Rachel McQuillan (Czechoslovakia) Radka Zrubáková	4–6, 6–3, 7–6^{(7–0)}
1993	(United States) Debbie Graham (Netherlands) Brenda Schultz	(Czech Republic) Petra Langrová (Argentina) Mercedes Paz	6–0, 6–4
1994	(Romania) Irina Spîrlea (France) Noëlle van Lottum	(Italy) Sandra Cecchini (France) Isabelle Demongeot	6–3, 2–6, 6–1
