= 1992 WTA Tour =

Women's tennis circuit

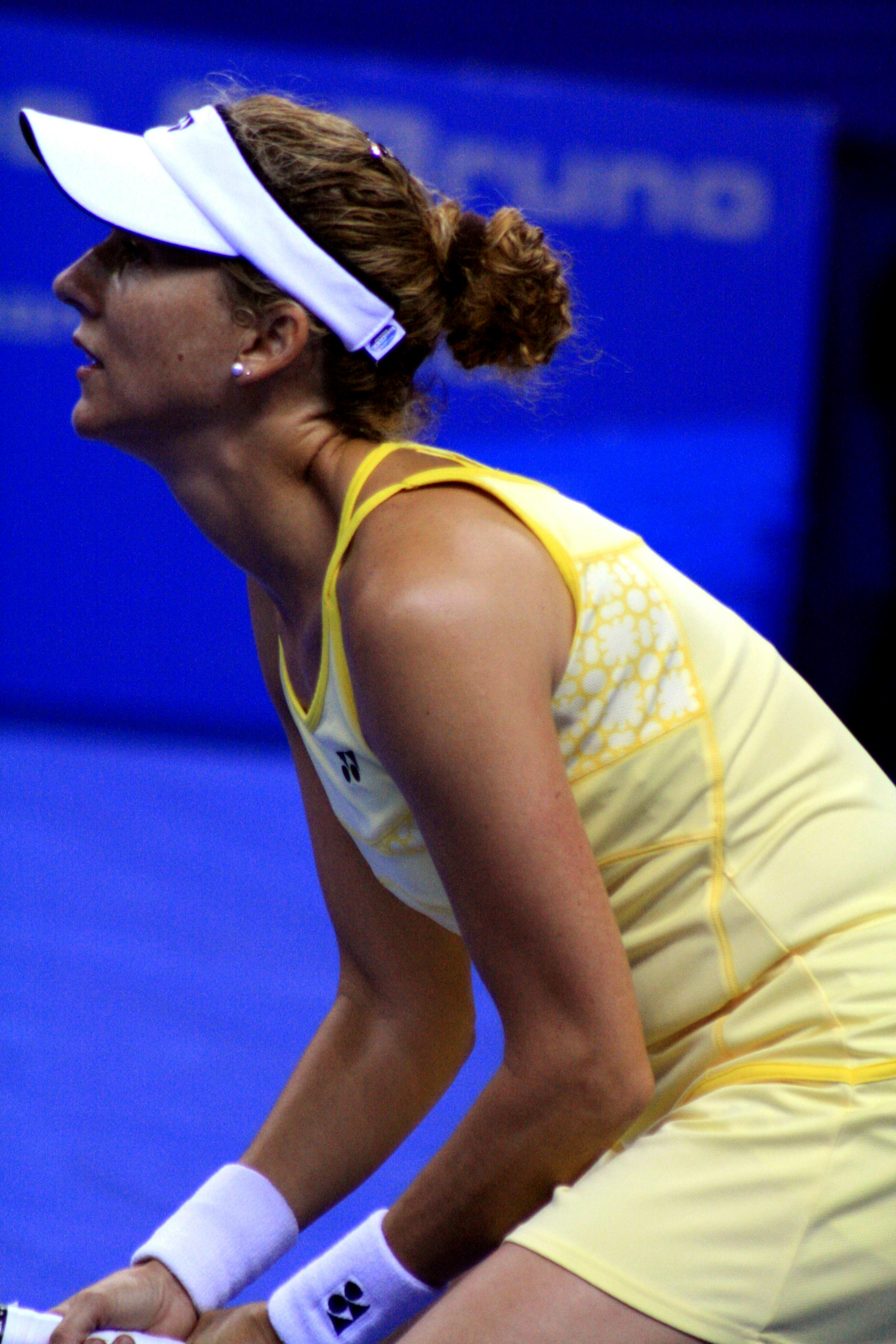
- Monica Seles finished the year as world No. 1 for the second time in her career. She won ten tournaments during the season, including three majors at the Australian Open, the French Open, and the US Open, as well as the WTA Tour Championships. She also finished runner-up at the fourth major, the Wimbledon Championships.

Details
- Duration: December 2, 1991 – November 16, 1992
- Edition: 20th
- Tournaments: 57
- Categories: Grand Slam (4); WTA Championships; Summer Olympics; WTA Tier I (6); WTA Tier II (15); WTA Tier III (5); WTA Tier IV (11); WTA Tier V (14)

Achievements (singles)
- Most titles: (Federal Republic of Yugoslavia) Monica Seles (10)
- Most finals: (Federal Republic of Yugoslavia) Monica Seles (14)
- Prize money leader: (Federal Republic of Yugoslavia) Monica Seles $2,622,352
- Points leader: (Federal Republic of Yugoslavia) Monica Seles 283.00

Awards
- Player of the year: (Federal Republic of Yugoslavia) Monica Seles
- Doubles team of the year: (Latvia) Larisa Neiland; (Commonwealth of Independent States) Natasha Zvereva
- Most improved player of the year: (Japan) Kimiko Date
- Newcomer of the year: (United States) Debbie Graham
- Comeback player of the year: (Australia) Jenny Byrne

The 1992 WTA Tour (officially titled 1992 Kraft General Foods World Tour after its sponsor) was the elite professional tennis circuit organized by the Women's Tennis Association (WTA) for the 1992 tennis season.

The WTA Tour is the elite tour for professional women's tennis organised by the Women's Tennis Association (WTA). The WTA Tour includes the four Grand Slam tournaments, the WTA Tour Championships and the WTA Tier I, Tier II, Tier III and Tier IV events. ITF tournaments are not part of the WTA Tour, although they award points for the WTA World Ranking.

== Schedule ==
Key

Grand Slam tournaments
Summer Olympic Games
Year-end championships
WTA Tier I tournaments
WTA Tier II events
WTA Tier III events
WTA Tier IV events
WTA Tier V events
Team events

=== December 1991 ===
Week	Tournament	Champions	Runners-up	Semifinalists	Quarterfinalists
Dec 2	Nivea Cup; São Paulo, Brazil; Tier V event Clay – $75,000 – 32S/32Q/16D	(Germany) Sabine Hack; 6–3, 7–5	(Germany) Veronika Martinek	(Argentina) Inés Gorrochategui (United States) Donna Faber	(Spain) Virginia Ruano (United States) Luanne Spadea (Argentina) Patricia Tarabini (Argentina) Florencia Labat
Dec 2	Nivea Cup; São Paulo, Brazil; Tier V event Clay – $75,000 – 32S/32Q/16D	(Argentina) Inés Gorrochategui (Argentina) Mercedes Paz; 6–2, 6–2	(United States) Renata Baranski (United States) Laura Glitz	(Argentina) Inés Gorrochategui (United States) Donna Faber	(Spain) Virginia Ruano (United States) Luanne Spadea (Argentina) Patricia Tarabini (Argentina) Florencia Labat
Dec 30	Hyundai Hopman Cup; Perth, Australia; ITF Mixed Teams Championships; Hard (i) – A$1,000,000 – 12 teams	Switzerland; 2–1	Czechoslovakia	Germany; Spain	France; United States; CIS; Spain
Dec 30	Danone Women's Open; Brisbane, Australia; WTA Tier IV; Hard – $150,000 – 56S/32Q/32D; Singles – Doubles	(Australia) Nicole Provis; 6–3, 6–2	(Australia) Rachel McQuillan	(Bulgaria) Magdalena Maleeva (United States) Debbie Graham	(Hungary) Andrea Temesvári (Czechoslovakia) Radka Zrubáková (Japan) Mana Endo (Germany) Claudia Kohde-Kilsch
Dec 30	Danone Women's Open; Brisbane, Australia; WTA Tier IV; Hard – $150,000 – 56S/32Q/32D; Singles – Doubles	(Czechoslovakia) Jana Novotná (Latvia) Larisa Neiland; 6–4, 6–3	(Netherlands) Manon Bollegraf (Australia) Nicole Provis	(Bulgaria) Magdalena Maleeva (United States) Debbie Graham	(Hungary) Andrea Temesvári (Czechoslovakia) Radka Zrubáková (Japan) Mana Endo (Germany) Claudia Kohde-Kilsch

=== January ===
Week	Tournament	Champions	Runners-up	Semifinalists	Quarterfinalists
Jan 6	NSW Open; Sydney, Australia; WTA Tier III; Hard – $225,000 – 56S/32Q/28D; Singles – Doubles	(Argentina) Gabriela Sabatini; 6–1, 6–1	(Spain) Arantxa Sánchez Vicario	(United States) Mary Joe Fernández (Germany) Anke Huber	(United States) Gigi Fernández (Commonwealth of Independent States) Leila Meskhi (Czechoslovakia) Jana Novotná (Spain) Conchita Martínez
Jan 6	NSW Open; Sydney, Australia; WTA Tier III; Hard – $225,000 – 56S/32Q/28D; Singles – Doubles	(Spain) Arantxa Sánchez Vicario (Czechoslovakia) Helena Suková; 7–6^{(7–4)}, 6–7^{(4–7)}, 6–2	(United States) Mary Joe Fernández (United States) Zina Garrison-Jackson	(United States) Mary Joe Fernández (Germany) Anke Huber	(United States) Gigi Fernández (Commonwealth of Independent States) Leila Meskhi (Czechoslovakia) Jana Novotná (Spain) Conchita Martínez
Jan 13; Jan 20	Australian Open; Melbourne, Australia; Grand Slam; Hard – $2,000,000 – 128S/48Q/64D/32X; Singles – Doubles – Mixed doubles	(Socialist Federal Republic of Yugoslavia) Monica Seles; 6–2, 6–3	(United States) Mary Joe Fernández	(Spain) Arantxa Sánchez Vicario (Argentina) Gabriela Sabatini	(Germany) Anke Huber (Switzerland) Manuela Maleeva-Fragnière (United States) Jennifer Capriati (United States) Amy Frazier
Jan 13; Jan 20	Australian Open; Melbourne, Australia; Grand Slam; Hard – $2,000,000 – 128S/48Q/64D/32X; Singles – Doubles – Mixed doubles	(Spain) Arantxa Sánchez Vicario (Czechoslovakia) Helena Suková; 6–4, 7–6^{(7–3)}	(United States) Mary Joe Fernández (United States) Zina Garrison-Jackson	(Spain) Arantxa Sánchez Vicario (Argentina) Gabriela Sabatini	(Germany) Anke Huber (Switzerland) Manuela Maleeva-Fragnière (United States) Jennifer Capriati (United States) Amy Frazier
Jan 13; Jan 20	Australian Open; Melbourne, Australia; Grand Slam; Hard – $2,000,000 – 128S/48Q/64D/32X; Singles – Doubles – Mixed doubles	(Australia) Nicole Provis (Australia) Mark Woodforde; 6–3, 4–6, 11–9	(Spain) Arantxa Sánchez Vicario (Australia) Todd Woodbridge	(Spain) Arantxa Sánchez Vicario (Argentina) Gabriela Sabatini	(Germany) Anke Huber (Switzerland) Manuela Maleeva-Fragnière (United States) Jennifer Capriati (United States) Amy Frazier
Jan 27	Nutri-Metics Bendon Classic; Auckland, New Zealand; WTA Tier V Hard – $100,000 – 32S/32Q/16D; Singles – Doubles	(United States) Robin White; 2–6, 6–4, 6–3	(Czechoslovakia) Andrea Strnadová	(Latvia) Larisa Neiland (Finland) Petra Thorén	(France) Alexia Dechaume (Argentina) Bettina Fulco (United Kingdom) Monique Javer (Italy) Raffaella Reggi
Jan 27	Nutri-Metics Bendon Classic; Auckland, New Zealand; WTA Tier V Hard – $100,000 – 32S/32Q/16D; Singles – Doubles	(South Africa) Rosalyn Fairbank-Nideffer (Italy) Raffaella Reggi; 1–6, 6–1, 7–5	(Canada) Jill Hetherington (United States) Kathy Rinaldi	(Latvia) Larisa Neiland (Finland) Petra Thorén	(France) Alexia Dechaume (Argentina) Bettina Fulco (United Kingdom) Monique Javer (Italy) Raffaella Reggi
Jan 27	Toray Pan Pacific Open; Tokyo, Japan; WTA Tier II; Carpet (i) – $350,000 – 28S/32Q/16D; Singles – Doubles	(Argentina) Gabriela Sabatini; 6–2, 4–6, 6–2	(United States) Martina Navratilova	(Japan) Kimiko Date (Bulgaria) Magdalena Maleeva	(United States) Pam Shriver (Spain) Arantxa Sánchez Vicario (Czechoslovakia) Helena Suková (Peru) Laura Gildemeister
Jan 27	Toray Pan Pacific Open; Tokyo, Japan; WTA Tier II; Carpet (i) – $350,000 – 28S/32Q/16D; Singles – Doubles	(Spain) Arantxa Sánchez Vicario (Czechoslovakia) Helena Suková; 7–5, 6–1	(United States) Martina Navratilova (United States) Pam Shriver	(Japan) Kimiko Date (Bulgaria) Magdalena Maleeva	(United States) Pam Shriver (Spain) Arantxa Sánchez Vicario (Czechoslovakia) Helena Suková (Peru) Laura Gildemeister

=== February ===
Week	Tournament	Champions	Runners-up	Semifinalists	Quarterfinalists
Feb 4	Fernleaf Butter Classic; Wellington, New Zealand; WTA Tier V Hard – $100,000 – 32S/32Q/16D; Singles – Doubles	(France) Noëlle van Lottum; 6–4, 6–0	(United States) Donna Faber	(United Kingdom) Monique Javer (United States) Ann Grossman	(Australia) Jo-Anne Faull (United Kingdom) Clare Wood (New Zealand) Claudine Toleafoa (Australia) Louise Field
Feb 4	Fernleaf Butter Classic; Wellington, New Zealand; WTA Tier V Hard – $100,000 – 32S/32Q/16D; Singles – Doubles	(United Kingdom) Belinda Borneo (United Kingdom) Clare Wood; 6–0, 7–6^{(7–5)}	(Australia) Jo-Anne Faull (New Zealand) Julie Richardson	(United Kingdom) Monique Javer (United States) Ann Grossman	(Australia) Jo-Anne Faull (United Kingdom) Clare Wood (New Zealand) Claudine Toleafoa (Australia) Louise Field
Feb 4	Nokia Grand Prix; Essen, Germany; WTA Tier II; Carpet (i) – $350,000 – 32S/32Q/16D	(Socialist Federal Republic of Yugoslavia) Monica Seles; 6–0, 6–3	(United States) Mary Joe Fernández	(France) Mary Pierce (Germany) Barbara Rittner	(Sweden) Catarina Lindqvist (Bulgaria) Katerina Maleeva (Germany) Anke Huber (Belgium) Sabine Appelmans
Feb 4	Nokia Grand Prix; Essen, Germany; WTA Tier II; Carpet (i) – $350,000 – 32S/32Q/16D	(Bulgaria) Katerina Maleeva (Germany) Barbara Rittner; 7–5, 6–3	(Belgium) Sabine Appelmans (Germany) Claudia Porwik	(France) Mary Pierce (Germany) Barbara Rittner	(Sweden) Catarina Lindqvist (Bulgaria) Katerina Maleeva (Germany) Anke Huber (Belgium) Sabine Appelmans
Feb 4	Mizuno World Ladies; Osaka, Japan; WTA Tier IV; Carpet (i) – $150,000 – 32S/32Q/16D; Singles – Doubles	(Czechoslovakia) Helena Suková; 6–2, 4–6, 6–1	(Peru) Laura Gildemeister	(Czechoslovakia) Karina Habšudová (Japan) Kimiko Date	(Japan) Kumiko Okamoto (Japan) Yone Kamio (Australia) Rachel McQuillan (Japan) Naoko Sawamatsu
Feb 4	Mizuno World Ladies; Osaka, Japan; WTA Tier IV; Carpet (i) – $150,000 – 32S/32Q/16D; Singles – Doubles	(Australia) Rennae Stubbs (Czechoslovakia) Helena Suková; 3–6, 6–4, 7–5	(United States) Sandy Collins (Australia) Rachel McQuillan	(Czechoslovakia) Karina Habšudová (Japan) Kimiko Date	(Japan) Kumiko Okamoto (Japan) Yone Kamio (Australia) Rachel McQuillan (Japan) Naoko Sawamatsu
Feb 10	Int. Austrian Indoor Championships; Linz, Austria; WTA Tier V Carpet (i) – $100,000 – 32S/32Q/16D; Singles – Doubles	(Ukraine) Natalia Medvedeva; 6–4, 6–2	(France) Pascale Paradis	(Russia) Eugenia Maniokova (Italy) Sandra Cecchini	(Germany) Claudia Porwik (France) Mary Pierce (Belgium) Dominique Monami (Sweden) Catarina Lindqvist
Feb 10	Int. Austrian Indoor Championships; Linz, Austria; WTA Tier V Carpet (i) – $100,000 – 32S/32Q/16D; Singles – Doubles	(Netherlands) Monique Kiene (Netherlands) Miriam Oremans; 6–4, 6–2	(Germany) Claudia Porwik (Italy) Raffaella Reggi	(Russia) Eugenia Maniokova (Italy) Sandra Cecchini	(Germany) Claudia Porwik (France) Mary Pierce (Belgium) Dominique Monami (Sweden) Catarina Lindqvist
Feb 10	Virginia Slims of Chicago; Chicago, United States; WTA Tier II; Carpet (i) – $350,000 – 28S/16D	(United States) Martina Navratilova; 7–6^{(7–4)}, 4–6, 7–5	(Czechoslovakia) Jana Novotná	(Germany) Steffi Graf (United States) Lori McNeil	(Netherlands) Manon Bollegraf (United States) Amy Frazier (United States) Zina Garrison-Jackson (United States) Pam Shriver
Feb 10	Virginia Slims of Chicago; Chicago, United States; WTA Tier II; Carpet (i) – $350,000 – 28S/16D	(United States) Martina Navratilova (United States) Pam Shriver; 6–4, 7–6^{(9–7)}	(United States) Katrina Adams (United States) Zina Garrison-Jackson	(Germany) Steffi Graf (United States) Lori McNeil	(Netherlands) Manon Bollegraf (United States) Amy Frazier (United States) Zina Garrison-Jackson (United States) Pam Shriver
Feb 17	Virginia Slims of Oklahoma; Oklahoma City, United States; WTA Tier IV; Hard (i) – $150,000 – 32S/32Q/16D; Singles – Doubles	(United States) Zina Garrison-Jackson; 7–5, 3–6, 7–6^{(12–10)}	(United States) Lori McNeil	(United States) Amy Frazier (Netherlands) Manon Bollegraf	(United States) Ann Grossman (United States) Debbie Graham (Australia) Nicole Provis (United States) Gigi Fernández
Feb 17	Virginia Slims of Oklahoma; Oklahoma City, United States; WTA Tier IV; Hard (i) – $150,000 – 32S/32Q/16D; Singles – Doubles	(United States) Lori McNeil (Australia) Nicole Provis; 3–6, 6–4, 7–6^{(8–6)}	(United States) Katrina Adams (Netherlands) Manon Bollegraf	(United States) Amy Frazier (Netherlands) Manon Bollegraf	(United States) Ann Grossman (United States) Debbie Graham (Australia) Nicole Provis (United States) Gigi Fernández
Feb 17	Cesena Championships; Cesena, Italy; WTA Tier V Carpet (i) – $100,000 – 32S/32Q/16D	(France) Mary Pierce; 6–1, 6–1	(France) Catherine Tanvier	(Poland) Katarzyna Nowak (Italy) Laura Golarsa	(Italy) Linda Ferrando (France) Nathalie Herreman (Czechoslovakia) Petra Langrová (France) Pascale Paradis
Feb 17	Cesena Championships; Cesena, Italy; WTA Tier V Carpet (i) – $100,000 – 32S/32Q/16D	(France) Catherine Suire (France) Catherine Tanvier; Default	(Belgium) Sabine Appelmans (Italy) Raffaella Reggi	(Poland) Katarzyna Nowak (Italy) Laura Golarsa	(Italy) Linda Ferrando (France) Nathalie Herreman (Czechoslovakia) Petra Langrová (France) Pascale Paradis
Feb 24	Matrix Essentials Evert Cup; Indian Wells, United States; WTA Tier II; Hard – $350,000 – 56S/32Q/28D; Singles – Doubles	(Socialist Federal Republic of Yugoslavia) Monica Seles; 6–3, 6–1	(Spain) Conchita Martínez	(Bulgaria) Katerina Maleeva (United States) Ann Grossman	(United States) Gigi Fernández (France) Nathalie Tauziat (Austria) Judith Wiesner (United States) Amy Frazier
Feb 24	Matrix Essentials Evert Cup; Indian Wells, United States; WTA Tier II; Hard – $350,000 – 56S/32Q/28D; Singles – Doubles	(Germany) Claudia Kohde-Kilsch (United States) Stephanie Rehe; 6–3, 6–3	(Canada) Jill Hetherington (United States) Kathy Rinaldi	(Bulgaria) Katerina Maleeva (United States) Ann Grossman	(United States) Gigi Fernández (France) Nathalie Tauziat (Austria) Judith Wiesner (United States) Amy Frazier

=== March ===
Week	Tournament	Champions	Runners-up	Semifinalists	Quarterfinalists
Mar 2	Virginia Slims of Florida; Boca Raton, United States; WTA Tier I Hard – $550,000 – 56S/32Q/28D; Singles – Doubles	(Germany) Steffi Graf; 3–6, 6–2, 6–0	(Spain) Conchita Martínez	(United States) Mary Joe Fernández (South Africa) Amanda Coetzer	(United States) Zina Garrison-Jackson (France) Nathalie Tauziat (Germany) Barbara Rittner (Argentina) Gabriela Sabatini
Mar 2	Virginia Slims of Florida; Boca Raton, United States; WTA Tier I Hard – $550,000 – 56S/32Q/28D; Singles – Doubles	(Latvia) Larisa Neiland (Commonwealth of Independent States) Natalia Zvereva; 6–2, 6–2	(United States) Linda Harvey-Wild (Spain) Conchita Martínez	(United States) Mary Joe Fernández (South Africa) Amanda Coetzer	(United States) Zina Garrison-Jackson (France) Nathalie Tauziat (Germany) Barbara Rittner (Argentina) Gabriela Sabatini
Mar 9	Lipton International Players Championships; Key Biscayne, United States; WTA Tier I Hard – $800,000 – 96S/64Q/48D; Singles – Doubles	(Spain) Arantxa Sánchez Vicario; 6–1, 6–4	(Argentina) Gabriela Sabatini	(United States) Jennifer Capriati (Germany) Steffi Graf	(Socialist Federal Republic of Yugoslavia) Monica Seles (South Africa) Amanda Coetzer (United States) Amy Frazier (United States) Mary Joe Fernández
Mar 9	Lipton International Players Championships; Key Biscayne, United States; WTA Tier I Hard – $800,000 – 96S/64Q/48D; Singles – Doubles	(Spain) Arantxa Sánchez Vicario (Latvia) Larisa Neiland; 7–5, 5–7, 6–3	(Canada) Jill Hetherington (United States) Kathy Rinaldi	(United States) Jennifer Capriati (Germany) Steffi Graf	(Socialist Federal Republic of Yugoslavia) Monica Seles (South Africa) Amanda Coetzer (United States) Amy Frazier (United States) Mary Joe Fernández
Mar 23	Acura U.S. Hardcourt Championships; San Antonio, United States; WTA Tier III; Hard – $225,000 – 28S/32Q/16D	(United States) Martina Navratilova; 6–2, 6–1	(France) Nathalie Tauziat	(United States) Pam Shriver (United States) Amy Frazier	(Italy) Raffaella Reggi (United States) Lori McNeil (Czechoslovakia) Karina Habšudová (Russia) Eugenia Maniokova
Mar 23	Acura U.S. Hardcourt Championships; San Antonio, United States; WTA Tier III; Hard – $225,000 – 28S/32Q/16D	(United States) Martina Navratilova (United States) Pam Shriver; 3–6, 6–2, 7–6^{(7–4)}	(United States) Patty Fendick (Czechoslovakia) Andrea Strnadová	(United States) Pam Shriver (United States) Amy Frazier	(Italy) Raffaella Reggi (United States) Lori McNeil (Czechoslovakia) Karina Habšudová (Russia) Eugenia Maniokova
Mar 23	Light 'n' Lively Doubles Championships; Wesley Chapel, United States; Clay – $175,000 – 8D; Doubles	(Czechoslovakia) Jana Novotná (Latvia) Larisa Neiland; 6–4, 6–2	(Spain) Arantxa Sánchez Vicario (Commonwealth of Independent States) Natalia Zvereva		
Mar 30	Family Circle Cup; Hilton Head Island, United States; WTA Tier I Clay – $550,000 – 56S/32Q/28D; Singles – Doubles	(Argentina) Gabriela Sabatini; 6–1, 6–4	(Spain) Conchita Martínez	(Netherlands) Brenda Schultz (Spain) Arantxa Sánchez Vicario	(Canada) Patricia Hy (United States) Caroline Kuhlman (Commonwealth of Independent States) Leila Meskhi (Commonwealth of Independent States) Natalia Zvereva
Mar 30	Family Circle Cup; Hilton Head Island, United States; WTA Tier I Clay – $550,000 – 56S/32Q/28D; Singles – Doubles	(Spain) Arantxa Sánchez Vicario (Commonwealth of Independent States) Natalia Zvereva; 6–4, 6–2	(Czechoslovakia) Jana Novotná (Latvia) Larisa Neiland	(Netherlands) Brenda Schultz (Spain) Arantxa Sánchez Vicario	(Canada) Patricia Hy (United States) Caroline Kuhlman (Commonwealth of Independent States) Leila Meskhi (Commonwealth of Independent States) Natalia Zvereva

=== April ===
Week	Tournament	Champions	Runners-up	Semifinalists	Quarterfinalists
Apr 6	Bausch & Lomb Championships; Amelia Island, United States; WTA Tier II; Clay – $350,000 – 56S/32Q/28D; Singles – Doubles	(Argentina) Gabriela Sabatini; 6–2, 1–6, 6–3	(Germany) Steffi Graf	(Spain) Arantxa Sánchez Vicario (Spain) Conchita Martínez	(Georgia (country)) Leila Meskhi (Germany) Sabine Hack (United States) Zina Garrison-Jackson (Czechoslovakia) Jana Novotná
Apr 6	Bausch & Lomb Championships; Amelia Island, United States; WTA Tier II; Clay – $350,000 – 56S/32Q/28D; Singles – Doubles	(Spain) Arantxa Sánchez Vicario (Commonwealth of Independent States) Natalia Zvereva; 6–1, 6–0	(United States) Zina Garrison-Jackson (Czechoslovakia) Jana Novotná	(Spain) Arantxa Sánchez Vicario (Spain) Conchita Martínez	(Georgia (country)) Leila Meskhi (Germany) Sabine Hack (United States) Zina Garrison-Jackson (Czechoslovakia) Jana Novotná
Apr 6	Japan Open Tennis Championships; Tokyo, Japan; WTA Tier IV; Hard – $150,000 – 32S/32Q/16D	(Japan) Kimiko Date; 7–5, 3–6, 6–3	(Belgium) Sabine Appelmans	(United States) Amy Frazier (Japan) Naoko Sawamatsu	(Ukraine) Natalia Medvedeva (United Kingdom) Monique Javer (Italy) Raffaella Reggi (United States) Marianne Werdel
Apr 6	Japan Open Tennis Championships; Tokyo, Japan; WTA Tier IV; Hard – $150,000 – 32S/32Q/16D	(United States) Amy Frazier (Japan) Rika Hiraki; 5–7, 7–6^{(7–5)}, 6–0	(Japan) Kimiko Date (United States) Stephanie Rehe	(United States) Amy Frazier (Japan) Naoko Sawamatsu	(Ukraine) Natalia Medvedeva (United Kingdom) Monique Javer (Italy) Raffaella Reggi (United States) Marianne Werdel
Apr 13	Volvo Women's Open; Pattaya City, Thailand; WTA Tier V Hard – $100,000 – 32S/32Q/16D; Singles – Doubles	(Belgium) Sabine Appelmans; 7–5, 3–6, 7–5	(Czechoslovakia) Andrea Strnadová	(Ukraine) Natalia Medvedeva (Indonesia) Yayuk Basuki	(Sweden) Catarina Lindqvist (Chinese Taipei) Wang Shi-ting (France) Pascale Paradis (Netherlands) Stephanie Rottier
Apr 13	Volvo Women's Open; Pattaya City, Thailand; WTA Tier V Hard – $100,000 – 32S/32Q/16D; Singles – Doubles	(France) Isabelle Demongeot (Ukraine) Natalia Medvedeva; 6–1, 6–1	(France) Pascale Paradis (France) Sandrine Testud	(Ukraine) Natalia Medvedeva (Indonesia) Yayuk Basuki	(Sweden) Catarina Lindqvist (Chinese Taipei) Wang Shi-ting (France) Pascale Paradis (Netherlands) Stephanie Rottier
Apr 13	Virginia Slims of Houston; Houston, United States; WTA Tier II; Clay – $350,000 – 28S/32Q/16D; Singles – Doubles	(Socialist Federal Republic of Yugoslavia) Monica Seles; 6–1, 6–1	(United States) Zina Garrison-Jackson	(Peru) Laura Gildemeister (Bulgaria) Katerina Maleeva	(Argentina) Bettina Fulco (United States) Gigi Fernández (Croatia) Iva Majoli (Italy) Sandra Cecchini
Apr 13	Virginia Slims of Houston; Houston, United States; WTA Tier II; Clay – $350,000 – 28S/32Q/16D; Singles – Doubles	(United States) Patty Fendick (United States) Gigi Fernández; 7–5, 6–4	(Canada) Jill Hetherington (United States) Kathy Rinaldi	(Peru) Laura Gildemeister (Bulgaria) Katerina Maleeva	(Argentina) Bettina Fulco (United States) Gigi Fernández (Croatia) Iva Majoli (Italy) Sandra Cecchini
Apr 20	Open Seat of Spain; Barcelona, Spain; WTA Tier III; Clay – $225,000 – 28S/28Q/16D; Singles – Doubles	(Socialist Federal Republic of Yugoslavia) Monica Seles; 3–6, 6–2, 6–3	(Spain) Arantxa Sánchez Vicario	(Switzerland) Manuela Maleeva-Fragnière (Spain) Conchita Martínez	(France) Mary Pierce (Germany) Wiltrud Probst (France) Nathalie Tauziat (France) Julie Halard
Apr 20	Open Seat of Spain; Barcelona, Spain; WTA Tier III; Clay – $225,000 – 28S/28Q/16D; Singles – Doubles	(Spain) Conchita Martínez (Spain) Arantxa Sánchez Vicario; 6–4, 6–1	(France) Nathalie Tauziat (Austria) Judith Wiesner	(Switzerland) Manuela Maleeva-Fragnière (Spain) Conchita Martínez	(France) Mary Pierce (Germany) Wiltrud Probst (France) Nathalie Tauziat (France) Julie Halard
Apr 20	Malaysian Women's Open; Kuala Lumpur, Malaysia; WTA Tier V Hard – $100,000 – 56S/28Q/16D	(Indonesia) Yayuk Basuki; 6–3, 6–0	(Czechoslovakia) Andrea Strnadová	(United Kingdom) Monique Javer (Sweden) Catarina Lindqvist	(Ukraine) Natalia Medvedeva (France) Pascale Paradis (China) Li Fang (Netherlands) Stephanie Rottier
Apr 20	Malaysian Women's Open; Kuala Lumpur, Malaysia; WTA Tier V Hard – $100,000 – 56S/28Q/16D	(France) Isabelle Demongeot (Ukraine) Natalia Medvedeva; 2–6, 6–4, 6–1	(Japan) Rika Hiraki (Czechoslovakia) Petra Langrová	(United Kingdom) Monique Javer (Sweden) Catarina Lindqvist	(Ukraine) Natalia Medvedeva (France) Pascale Paradis (China) Li Fang (Netherlands) Stephanie Rottier
Apr 27	Citizen Cup; Hamburg, Germany; WTA Tier II; Clay – $350,000 – 32S/16D; Singles – Doubles	(Germany) Steffi Graf; 7–6^{(7–5)}, 6–2	(Spain) Arantxa Sánchez Vicario	(Germany) Anke Huber (Argentina) Gabriela Sabatini	(Georgia (country)) Leila Meskhi (Switzerland) Manuela Maleeva-Fragnière (Czechoslovakia) Jana Novotná (Austria) Judith Wiesner
Apr 27	Citizen Cup; Hamburg, Germany; WTA Tier II; Clay – $350,000 – 32S/16D; Singles – Doubles	(Germany) Steffi Graf (Australia) Rennae Stubbs; 4–6, 6–3, 6–4	(Netherlands) Manon Bollegraf (Spain) Arantxa Sánchez Vicario	(Germany) Anke Huber (Argentina) Gabriela Sabatini	(Georgia (country)) Leila Meskhi (Switzerland) Manuela Maleeva-Fragnière (Czechoslovakia) Jana Novotná (Austria) Judith Wiesner
Apr 27	Ilva Trophy; Taranto, Italy; WTA Tier V Clay – $100,000 – 32S/32Q/16D; Singles – Doubles	(France) Julie Halard; 6–0, 7–5	(Switzerland) Emanuela Zardo	(Italy) Linda Ferrando (Czechoslovakia) Radka Zrubáková	(France) Catherine Mothes (South Africa) Amanda Coetzer (Germany) Veronika Martinek (United States) Ann Grossman
Apr 27	Ilva Trophy; Taranto, Italy; WTA Tier V Clay – $100,000 – 32S/32Q/16D; Singles – Doubles	(South Africa) Amanda Coetzer (Argentina) Inés Gorrochategui; 4–6, 6–3, 7–3^{(7–0)}	(Australia) Rachel McQuillan (Czechoslovakia) Radka Zrubáková	(Italy) Linda Ferrando (Czechoslovakia) Radka Zrubáková	(France) Catherine Mothes (South Africa) Amanda Coetzer (Germany) Veronika Martinek (United States) Ann Grossman

=== May ===
Week	Tournament	Champions	Runners-up	Semifinalists	Quarterfinalists
May 4	Peugeot Italian Open; Rome, Italy; WTA Tier I Clay – $550,000 – 56S/28D; Singles – Doubles	(Argentina) Gabriela Sabatini; 7–5, 6–4	(Federal Republic of Yugoslavia) Monica Seles	(South Africa) Amanda Coetzer (United States) Mary Joe Fernández	(Commonwealth of Independent States) Leila Meskhi (Commonwealth of Independent States) Natalia Zvereva (Germany) Anke Huber (France) Nathalie Tauziat
May 4	Peugeot Italian Open; Rome, Italy; WTA Tier I Clay – $550,000 – 56S/28D; Singles – Doubles	(Federal Republic of Yugoslavia) Monica Seles (Czechoslovakia) Helena Suková; 6–1, 6–2	(Bulgaria) Katerina Maleeva (Germany) Barbara Rittner	(South Africa) Amanda Coetzer (United States) Mary Joe Fernández	(Commonwealth of Independent States) Leila Meskhi (Commonwealth of Independent States) Natalia Zvereva (Germany) Anke Huber (France) Nathalie Tauziat
May 4	Belgian Open; Waregem, Belgium; WTA Tier V Clay – $100,000 – 32S/31Q/16D	(Germany) Wiltrud Probst; 6–2, 6–3	(Germany) Meike Babel	(Finland) Nanne Dahlman (Netherlands) Nicole Muns-Jagerman	(Netherlands) Esmir Hoogendoorn (France) Sybille Niox-Château (Australia) Kristin Godridge (Switzerland) Emanuela Zardo
May 4	Belgian Open; Waregem, Belgium; WTA Tier V Clay – $100,000 – 32S/31Q/16D	(Netherlands) Manon Bollegraf (Netherlands) Caroline Vis; 6–4, 6–3	(Ukraine) Elena Brioukhovets (Czechoslovakia) Petra Langrová	(Finland) Nanne Dahlman (Netherlands) Nicole Muns-Jagerman	(Netherlands) Esmir Hoogendoorn (France) Sybille Niox-Château (Australia) Kristin Godridge (Switzerland) Emanuela Zardo
May 11	Lufthansa Cup; Berlin, Germany; WTA Tier I Clay – $550,000 – 56S/32Q/28D; Singles – Doubles	(Germany) Steffi Graf; 4–6, 7–5, 6–2	(Spain) Arantxa Sánchez Vicario	(United States) Jennifer Capriati (United States) Mary Joe Fernández	(France) Julie Halard (Czechoslovakia) Radka Zrubáková (Italy) Sandra Cecchini (Belgium) Sabine Appelmans
May 11	Lufthansa Cup; Berlin, Germany; WTA Tier I Clay – $550,000 – 56S/32Q/28D; Singles – Doubles	(Czechoslovakia) Jana Novotná (Latvia) Larisa Neiland; 7–6^{(7–5)}, 4–6, 7–5	(United States) Gigi Fernández (Commonwealth of Independent States) Natalia Zvereva	(United States) Jennifer Capriati (United States) Mary Joe Fernández	(France) Julie Halard (Czechoslovakia) Radka Zrubáková (Italy) Sandra Cecchini (Belgium) Sabine Appelmans
May 18	Internationaux de Strasbourg; Strasbourg, France; WTA Tier IV; Clay – $150,000 – 28S/16D; Singles – Doubles	(Austria) Judith Wiesner; 6–1, 6–3	(Japan) Naoko Sawamatsu	(South Africa) Mariaan de Swardt (Argentina) Bettina Fulco	(United States) Debbie Graham (France) Sandrine Testud (Argentina) Mercedes Paz (Argentina) Florencia Labat
May 18	Internationaux de Strasbourg; Strasbourg, France; WTA Tier IV; Clay – $150,000 – 28S/16D; Singles – Doubles	(United States) Patty Fendick (Czechoslovakia) Andrea Strnadová; 6–3, 6–4	(United States) Lori McNeil (Argentina) Mercedes Paz	(South Africa) Mariaan de Swardt (Argentina) Bettina Fulco	(United States) Debbie Graham (France) Sandrine Testud (Argentina) Mercedes Paz (Argentina) Florencia Labat
May 18	Lucerne Ladies European Open; Lucerne, Switzerland; WTA Tier IV; Clay – $150,000 – 28S/32Q/16D; Singles – Doubles	(United States) Amy Frazier; 6–4, 4–6, 7–5	(Czechoslovakia) Radka Zrubáková	(Switzerland) Emanuela Zardo (Switzerland) Christelle Fauche	(Germany) Sabine Hack (Bulgaria) Magdalena Maleeva (South Africa) Amanda Coetzer (United States) Linda Harvey-Wild
May 18	Lucerne Ladies European Open; Lucerne, Switzerland; WTA Tier IV; Clay – $150,000 – 28S/32Q/16D; Singles – Doubles	(United States) Amy Frazier (South Africa) Elna Reinach; 7–5, 6–2	(Czechoslovakia) Karina Habšudová (United States) Marianne Werdel	(Switzerland) Emanuela Zardo (Switzerland) Christelle Fauche	(Germany) Sabine Hack (Bulgaria) Magdalena Maleeva (South Africa) Amanda Coetzer (United States) Linda Harvey-Wild
May 25; Jun 1	French Open; Paris, France; Grand Slam; Clay – $3,277,836 – 128S/64Q/64D/64X; Singles – Doubles – Mixed doubles	(Federal Republic of Yugoslavia) Monica Seles; 6–2, 3–6, 10–8	(Germany) Steffi Graf	(Argentina) Gabriela Sabatini (Spain) Arantxa Sánchez Vicario	(United States) Jennifer Capriati (Spain) Conchita Martínez (Netherlands) Manon Bollegraf (Commonwealth of Independent States) Natalia Zvereva
May 25; Jun 1	French Open; Paris, France; Grand Slam; Clay – $3,277,836 – 128S/64Q/64D/64X; Singles – Doubles – Mixed doubles	(United States) Gigi Fernández (Commonwealth of Independent States) Natalia Zvereva; 6–3, 6–2	(Spain) Conchita Martínez (Spain) Arantxa Sánchez Vicario	(Argentina) Gabriela Sabatini (Spain) Arantxa Sánchez Vicario	(United States) Jennifer Capriati (Spain) Conchita Martínez (Netherlands) Manon Bollegraf (Commonwealth of Independent States) Natalia Zvereva
May 25; Jun 1	French Open; Paris, France; Grand Slam; Clay – $3,277,836 – 128S/64Q/64D/64X; Singles – Doubles – Mixed doubles	(Spain) Arantxa Sánchez Vicario (Australia) Mark Woodforde; 6–2, 6–3	(United States) Lori McNeil (United States) Bryan Shelton	(Argentina) Gabriela Sabatini (Spain) Arantxa Sánchez Vicario	(United States) Jennifer Capriati (Spain) Conchita Martínez (Netherlands) Manon Bollegraf (Commonwealth of Independent States) Natalia Zvereva

=== June ===
Week	Tournament	Champions	Runners-up	Semifinalists	Quarterfinalists
Jun 8	Dow Classic; Birmingham, Great Britain; WTA Tier IV; Grass – $150,000 – 56S/32Q/28D; Singles – Doubles	(Netherlands) Brenda Schultz; 6–2, 6–2	(Australia) Jenny Byrne	(United States) Pam Shriver (United Kingdom) Jo Durie	(United States) Zina Garrison-Jackson (Latvia) Larisa Neiland (United States) Lori McNeil (Hungary) Andrea Temesvári
Jun 8	Dow Classic; Birmingham, Great Britain; WTA Tier IV; Grass – $150,000 – 56S/32Q/28D; Singles – Doubles	(United States) Lori McNeil (Australia) Rennae Stubbs; 5–7, 6–3, 8–6	(United States) Sandy Collins (South Africa) Elna Reinach	(United States) Pam Shriver (United Kingdom) Jo Durie	(United States) Zina Garrison-Jackson (Latvia) Larisa Neiland (United States) Lori McNeil (Hungary) Andrea Temesvári
Jun 15	Pilkington Glass Championships; Eastbourne, Great Britain; WTA Tier II; Grass – $350,000 – 64S/32Q/32D; Singles – Doubles	(United States) Lori McNeil; 6–4, 6–4	(United States) Linda Harvey-Wild	(South Africa) Rosalyn Fairbank (United States) Mary Joe Fernández	(Australia) Rennae Stubbs (Czechoslovakia) Jana Novotná (France) Nathalie Tauziat (Czechoslovakia) Helena Suková
Jun 15	Pilkington Glass Championships; Eastbourne, Great Britain; WTA Tier II; Grass – $350,000 – 64S/32Q/32D; Singles – Doubles	(Czechoslovakia) Jana Novotná (Latvia) Larisa Neiland; 6–0, 6–3	(United States) Mary Joe Fernández (United States) Zina Garrison-Jackson	(South Africa) Rosalyn Fairbank (United States) Mary Joe Fernández	(Australia) Rennae Stubbs (Czechoslovakia) Jana Novotná (France) Nathalie Tauziat (Czechoslovakia) Helena Suková
Jun 22; Jun 29	Wimbledon Championships; London, Great Britain; Grand Slam; Grass – $3,000,000 – 128S/64Q/64D/64X; Singles – Doubles – Mixed doubles	(Germany) Steffi Graf; 6–2, 6–1	(Federal Republic of Yugoslavia) Monica Seles	(United States) Martina Navratilova (Argentina) Gabriela Sabatini	(France) Nathalie Tauziat (Bulgaria) Katerina Maleeva (United States) Jennifer Capriati (Commonwealth of Independent States) Natasha Zvereva
Jun 22; Jun 29	Wimbledon Championships; London, Great Britain; Grand Slam; Grass – $3,000,000 – 128S/64Q/64D/64X; Singles – Doubles – Mixed doubles	(United States) Gigi Fernández (Commonwealth of Independent States) Natasha Zvereva; 6–4, 6–1	(Latvia) Larisa Neiland (Czechoslovakia) Jana Novotná	(United States) Martina Navratilova (Argentina) Gabriela Sabatini	(France) Nathalie Tauziat (Bulgaria) Katerina Maleeva (United States) Jennifer Capriati (Commonwealth of Independent States) Natasha Zvereva
Jun 22; Jun 29	Wimbledon Championships; London, Great Britain; Grand Slam; Grass – $3,000,000 – 128S/64Q/64D/64X; Singles – Doubles – Mixed doubles	(Latvia) Larisa Neiland (Czechoslovakia) Cyril Suk; 7–6^{(7–2)}, 6–2	(Netherlands) Miriam Oremans (Netherlands) Jacco Eltingh	(United States) Martina Navratilova (Argentina) Gabriela Sabatini	(France) Nathalie Tauziat (Bulgaria) Katerina Maleeva (United States) Jennifer Capriati (Commonwealth of Independent States) Natasha Zvereva

=== July ===
Week	Tournament	Champions	Runners-up	Semifinalists	Quarterfinalists
Jul 6	Internazionali Femminili di Palermo; Palermo, Italy; WTA Tier V Clay – $100,000 – 32S/32Q/16D; Singles – Doubles	(France) Mary Pierce; 6–0, 6–3	(Netherlands) Brenda Schultz	(Italy) Silvia Farina (Croatia) Nadin Ercegović	(Czechoslovakia) Petra Langrová (France) Catherine Mothes (United States) Halle Cioffi (Italy) Natalia Baudone
Jul 6	Internazionali Femminili di Palermo; Palermo, Italy; WTA Tier V Clay – $100,000 – 32S/32Q/16D; Singles – Doubles	(United States) Halle Cioffi (Argentina) María José Gaidano; 6–3, 4–6, 6–3	(Czechoslovakia) Petra Langrová (Spain) Ana Segura	(Italy) Silvia Farina (Croatia) Nadin Ercegović	(Czechoslovakia) Petra Langrová (France) Catherine Mothes (United States) Halle Cioffi (Italy) Natalia Baudone
Jul 6	Citroën Cup Austrian Ladies Open; Kitzbühel, Austria; WTA Tier IV; Clay – $150,000 – 32S/32Q/16D; Singles – Doubles	(Spain) Conchita Martínez; 6–0, 3–6, 6–2	(Switzerland) Manuela Maleeva-Fragnière	(South Africa) Amanda Coetzer (Argentina) Florencia Labat	(France) Alexia Dechaume (Germany) Wiltrud Probst (Austria) Judith Wiesner (Italy) Sandra Cecchini
Jul 6	Citroën Cup Austrian Ladies Open; Kitzbühel, Austria; WTA Tier IV; Clay – $150,000 – 32S/32Q/16D; Singles – Doubles	(Argentina) Florencia Labat (France) Alexia Dechaume; 6–3, 6–3	(South Africa) Amanda Coetzer (Germany) Wiltrud Probst	(South Africa) Amanda Coetzer (Argentina) Florencia Labat	(France) Alexia Dechaume (Germany) Wiltrud Probst (Austria) Judith Wiesner (Italy) Sandra Cecchini
July 13	Fed Cup; Frankfurt, Germany; Team Event; Clay – $0 – 32 Teams	Germany; 2–1	Spain	United States; Australia	Argentina; Czechoslovakia; Poland; France
Jul 20	Internazionali di Tennis San Marino; City of San Marino, San Marino; WTA Tier V Clay – $100,000 – 32S/32Q/16D; Singles – Doubles	(Bulgaria) Magdalena Maleeva; 7–6^{(7–3)}, 6–4	(Italy) Federica Bonsignori	(France) Alexia Dechaume (Argentina) Mercedes Paz	(Italy) Flora Perfetti (Argentina) Patricia Tarabini (Argentina) Florencia Labat (Argentina) Bettina Fulco
Jul 20	Internazionali di Tennis San Marino; City of San Marino, San Marino; WTA Tier V Clay – $100,000 – 32S/32Q/16D; Singles – Doubles	(France) Alexia Dechaume (Argentina) Florencia Labat; 7–6^{(8–6)}, 7–5	(Italy) Sandra Cecchini (Italy) Laura Garrone	(France) Alexia Dechaume (Argentina) Mercedes Paz	(Italy) Flora Perfetti (Argentina) Patricia Tarabini (Argentina) Florencia Labat (Argentina) Bettina Fulco
Jul 20	HTC Prague Open; Prague, Czechoslovakia; WTA Tier V Clay – $100,000 – 32S/32Q/16D; Singles – Doubles	(Czechoslovakia) Radka Zrubáková; 6–3, 7–5	(Czechoslovakia) Kateřina Kroupová	(Netherlands) Monique Kiene (Germany) Veronika Martinek	(Czechoslovakia) Eva Švíglerová (Germany) Silke Meier (Netherlands) Noëlle van Lottum (Germany) Karin Kschwendt
Jul 20	HTC Prague Open; Prague, Czechoslovakia; WTA Tier V Clay – $100,000 – 32S/32Q/16D; Singles – Doubles	(Germany) Karin Kschwendt (Austria) Petra Ritter; 6–4, 2–6, 7–5	(Czechoslovakia) Eva Švíglerová (Netherlands) Noëlle van Lottum	(Netherlands) Monique Kiene (Germany) Veronika Martinek	(Czechoslovakia) Eva Švíglerová (Germany) Silke Meier (Netherlands) Noëlle van Lottum (Germany) Karin Kschwendt
Jul 27; Aug 3	Summer Olympic Games; Barcelona, Spain; Summer Olympic Games; Clay; 64S/32D; Singles – Doubles	Gold	Silver	Bronze	(Belgium) Sabine Appelmans (Switzerland) Manuela Maleeva-Fragnière (Germany) Anke Huber (Spain) Conchita Martínez
Jul 27; Aug 3	Summer Olympic Games; Barcelona, Spain; Summer Olympic Games; Clay; 64S/32D; Singles – Doubles	(United States) Jennifer Capriati; 3–6, 6–3, 6–4	(Germany) Steffi Graf	(United States) Mary Joe Fernández (Spain) Arantxa Sánchez Vicario	(Belgium) Sabine Appelmans (Switzerland) Manuela Maleeva-Fragnière (Germany) Anke Huber (Spain) Conchita Martínez
Jul 27; Aug 3	Summer Olympic Games; Barcelona, Spain; Summer Olympic Games; Clay; 64S/32D; Singles – Doubles	(United States) Gigi Fernández (United States) Mary Joe Fernández; 7–5, 2–6, 6–2	(Spain) Conchita Martínez (Spain) Arantxa Sánchez Vicario	(Australia) Rachel McQuillan (Australia) Nicole Provis (Commonwealth of Independent States) Leila Meskhi (Commonwealth of Independent States) Natasha Zvereva	(Belgium) Sabine Appelmans (Switzerland) Manuela Maleeva-Fragnière (Germany) Anke Huber (Spain) Conchita Martínez

=== August ===
Week	Tournament	Champions	Runners-up	Semifinalists	Quarterfinalists
Aug 10	Virginia Slims of Los Angeles; Manhattan Beach, United States; WTA Tier II; Hard – $350,000 – 28S/32Q/16D	(United States) Martina Navratilova; 6–4, 6–2	(Federal Republic of Yugoslavia) Monica Seles	(Spain) Arantxa Sánchez Vicario (Switzerland) Manuela Maleeva-Fragnière	(United States) Amy Frazier (Czechoslovakia) Helena Suková (United States) Kimberly Po (United States) Zina Garrison-Jackson
Aug 10	Virginia Slims of Los Angeles; Manhattan Beach, United States; WTA Tier II; Hard – $350,000 – 28S/32Q/16D	(Spain) Arantxa Sánchez Vicario (Czechoslovakia) Helena Suková; 6–4, 6–2	(United States) Zina Garrison-Jackson (United States) Pam Shriver	(Spain) Arantxa Sánchez Vicario (Switzerland) Manuela Maleeva-Fragnière	(United States) Amy Frazier (Czechoslovakia) Helena Suková (United States) Kimberly Po (United States) Zina Garrison-Jackson
Aug 17	Matinee Ltd. Canadian Open; Montreal, Canada; WTA Tier I Hard – $550,000 – 56S/28D; Singles – Doubles	(Spain) Arantxa Sánchez Vicario; 6–4, 3–6, 6–4	(Federal Republic of Yugoslavia) Monica Seles	(United States) Lori McNeil (Czechoslovakia) Helena Suková	(Canada) Patricia Hy (Switzerland) Manuela Maleeva-Fragnière (United States) Mary Joe Fernández (France) Nathalie Tauziat
Aug 17	Matinee Ltd. Canadian Open; Montreal, Canada; WTA Tier I Hard – $550,000 – 56S/28D; Singles – Doubles	(United States) Lori McNeil (Australia) Rennae Stubbs; 3–6, 7–5, 7–5	(United States) Gigi Fernández (Commonwealth of Independent States) Natasha Zvereva	(United States) Lori McNeil (Czechoslovakia) Helena Suková	(Canada) Patricia Hy (Switzerland) Manuela Maleeva-Fragnière (United States) Mary Joe Fernández (France) Nathalie Tauziat
Aug 24	Mazda Classic; San Diego, United States; WTA Tier III; Carpet (i) – $224,000 – 28S/16D	(United States) Jennifer Capriati; 6–3, 6–2	(Spain) Conchita Martínez	(Commonwealth of Independent States) Leila Meskhi (Germany) Anke Huber	(Argentina) Gabriela Sabatini (United States) Ann Grossman (France) Nathalie Tauziat (United States) Zina Garrison-Jackson
Aug 24	Mazda Classic; San Diego, United States; WTA Tier III; Carpet (i) – $224,000 – 28S/16D	(Czechoslovakia) Jana Novotná (Latvia) Larisa Neiland; 6–1, 6–4	(Spain) Conchita Martínez (Argentina) Mercedes Paz	(Commonwealth of Independent States) Leila Meskhi (Germany) Anke Huber	(Argentina) Gabriela Sabatini (United States) Ann Grossman (France) Nathalie Tauziat (United States) Zina Garrison-Jackson
Aug 24	OTB International Open; Schenectady, United States; WTA Tier V Hard – $100,000 – 32S/32Q/16D; Singles – Doubles	(Germany) Barbara Rittner; 7–6^{(7–3)}, 6–3	(Netherlands) Brenda Schultz	(United States) Marianne Werdel (Argentina) Florencia Labat	(Netherlands) Stephanie Rottier (France) Alexia Dechaume (Canada) Helen Kelesi (Czechoslovakia) Radka Zrubáková
Aug 24	OTB International Open; Schenectady, United States; WTA Tier V Hard – $100,000 – 32S/32Q/16D; Singles – Doubles	(France) Alexia Dechaume (Argentina) Florencia Labat; 6–3, 1–6, 6–2	(United States) Ginger Helgeson (United States) Shannan McCarthy	(United States) Marianne Werdel (Argentina) Florencia Labat	(Netherlands) Stephanie Rottier (France) Alexia Dechaume (Canada) Helen Kelesi (Czechoslovakia) Radka Zrubáková
Aug 31; Sep 7	US Open; New York City, United States; Grand Slam; Hard – $3,734,850 – 128S/64Q/64D/32X; Singles – Doubles – Mixed doubles	(Federal Republic of Yugoslavia) Monica Seles; 6–3, 6–3	(Spain) Arantxa Sánchez Vicario	(United States) Mary Joe Fernández (Switzerland) Manuela Maleeva-Fragnière	(Canada) Patricia Hy (Argentina) Gabriela Sabatini (Bulgaria) Magdalena Maleeva (Germany) Steffi Graf
Aug 31; Sep 7	US Open; New York City, United States; Grand Slam; Hard – $3,734,850 – 128S/64Q/64D/32X; Singles – Doubles – Mixed doubles	(United States) Gigi Fernández (Commonwealth of Independent States) Natasha Zvereva; 7–6^{(7–4)}, 6–1	(Czechoslovakia) Jana Novotná (Latvia) Larisa Neiland	(United States) Mary Joe Fernández (Switzerland) Manuela Maleeva-Fragnière	(Canada) Patricia Hy (Argentina) Gabriela Sabatini (Bulgaria) Magdalena Maleeva (Germany) Steffi Graf
Aug 31; Sep 7	US Open; New York City, United States; Grand Slam; Hard – $3,734,850 – 128S/64Q/64D/32X; Singles – Doubles – Mixed doubles	(Australia) Nicole Provis (Australia) Mark Woodforde; 4–6, 6–3, 6–3	(Czechoslovakia) Helena Suková (Netherlands) Tom Nijssen	(United States) Mary Joe Fernández (Switzerland) Manuela Maleeva-Fragnière	(Canada) Patricia Hy (Argentina) Gabriela Sabatini (Bulgaria) Magdalena Maleeva (Germany) Steffi Graf

=== September ===
Week	Tournament	Champions	Runners-up	Semifinalists	Quarterfinalists
Sep 14	Clarins Open; Paris, France; WTA Tier IV; Clay – $150,000 – 32S/32Q/16D; Singles – Doubles	(Italy) Sandra Cecchini; 6–2, 6–1	(Switzerland) Emanuela Zardo	(France) Julie Halard (Croatia) Nadin Ercegović	(Italy) Federica Bonsignori (Germany) Silke Meier (Germany) Veronika Martinek (Germany) Sabine Hack
Sep 14	Clarins Open; Paris, France; WTA Tier IV; Clay – $150,000 – 32S/32Q/16D; Singles – Doubles	(Italy) Sandra Cecchini (Argentina) Patricia Tarabini; 7–5, 6–1	(Australia) Rachel McQuillan (Netherlands) Noëlle van Lottum	(France) Julie Halard (Croatia) Nadin Ercegović	(Italy) Federica Bonsignori (Germany) Silke Meier (Germany) Veronika Martinek (Germany) Sabine Hack
Sep 21	Nichirei International Championships; Tokyo, Japan; WTA Tier II; Hard – $350,000 – 28S/16D; Singles – Doubles	(Federal Republic of Yugoslavia) Monica Seles; 6–2, 6–0	(Argentina) Gabriela Sabatini	(United States) Mary Joe Fernández (Bulgaria) Katerina Maleeva	(Japan) Naoko Sawamatsu (Japan) Kyōko Nagatsuka (United States) Marianne Werdel (Japan) Kimiko Date
Sep 21	Nichirei International Championships; Tokyo, Japan; WTA Tier II; Hard – $350,000 – 28S/16D; Singles – Doubles	(United States) Mary Joe Fernández (United States) Robin White; 6–4, 6–4	(Indonesia) Yayuk Basuki (Japan) Nana Miyagi	(United States) Mary Joe Fernández (Bulgaria) Katerina Maleeva	(Japan) Naoko Sawamatsu (Japan) Kyōko Nagatsuka (United States) Marianne Werdel (Japan) Kimiko Date
Sep 28	Open Whirlpool - Ville de Bayonne; Bayonne, France; WTA Tier IV; Carpet (i) – $150,000 – 32S/32Q/16D	(Switzerland) Manuela Maleeva-Fragnière; 6–7^{(4–7)}, 6–2, 6–3	(France) Nathalie Tauziat	(Australia) Rachel McQuillan (France) Pascale Paradis	(Belgium) Dominique Monami (Finland) Nanne Dahlman (Netherlands) Noëlle van Lottum (United States) Stephanie Rehe
Sep 28	Open Whirlpool - Ville de Bayonne; Bayonne, France; WTA Tier IV; Carpet (i) – $150,000 – 32S/32Q/16D	(Italy) Linda Ferrando (Czechoslovakia) Petra Langrová; 1–6, 6–3, 6–4	(Germany) Claudia Kohde-Kilsch (United States) Stephanie Rehe	(Australia) Rachel McQuillan (France) Pascale Paradis	(Belgium) Dominique Monami (Finland) Nanne Dahlman (Netherlands) Noëlle van Lottum (United States) Stephanie Rehe
Sep 28	P&G Taiwan Women's Open; Taipei, Taiwan; WTA Tier V Hard – $100,000 – 32S/32Q/16D; Singles – Doubles	(United States) Shaun Stafford; 6–1, 6–3	(United States) Ann Grossman	(South Africa) Amanda Coetzer (Japan) Nana Miyagi	(United States) Debbie Graham (United States) Marianne Werdel (Australia) Louise Field (Chinese Taipei) Wang Shi-ting
Sep 28	P&G Taiwan Women's Open; Taipei, Taiwan; WTA Tier V Hard – $100,000 – 32S/32Q/16D; Singles – Doubles	(Australia) Jo-Anne Faull (New Zealand) Julie Richardson; 7–5, 6–3	(South Africa) Amanda Coetzer (United States) Cammy MacGregor	(South Africa) Amanda Coetzer (Japan) Nana Miyagi	(United States) Debbie Graham (United States) Marianne Werdel (Australia) Louise Field (Chinese Taipei) Wang Shi-ting
Sep 28	Volkswagen Cup Damen Grand Prix; Leipzig, Germany; WTA Tier III; Carpet (i) – $225,000 – 32S/16D; Singles – Doubles	(Germany) Steffi Graf; 6–3, 1–6, 6–4	(Czechoslovakia) Jana Novotná	(Bulgaria) Katerina Maleeva (Czechoslovakia) Helena Suková	(Bulgaria) Magdalena Maleeva (Germany) Anke Huber (Belgium) Sabine Appelmans (Spain) Conchita Martínez
Sep 28	Volkswagen Cup Damen Grand Prix; Leipzig, Germany; WTA Tier III; Carpet (i) – $225,000 – 32S/16D; Singles – Doubles	(Czechoslovakia) Jana Novotná (Latvia) Larisa Savchenko-Neiland; 7–5, 7–6^{(7–4)}	(United States) Patty Fendick (Czechoslovakia) Andrea Strnadová	(Bulgaria) Katerina Maleeva (Czechoslovakia) Helena Suková	(Bulgaria) Magdalena Maleeva (Germany) Anke Huber (Belgium) Sabine Appelmans (Spain) Conchita Martínez

=== October ===
Week	Tournament	Champions	Runners-up	Semifinalists	Quarterfinalists
Oct 5	BMW European Indoors; Zürich, Switzerland; WTA Tier II; Carpet (i) – $350,000 – 32S/32Q/16D; Singles – Doubles	(West Germany) Steffi Graf; 2–6, 7–5, 7–5	(United States) Martina Navratilova	(Czechoslovakia) Jana Novotná (United States) Patty Fendick	(Austria) Judith Wiesner (Czechoslovakia) Andrea Strnadová (United States) Zina Garrison-Jackson (Bulgaria) Magdalena Maleeva
Oct 5	BMW European Indoors; Zürich, Switzerland; WTA Tier II; Carpet (i) – $350,000 – 32S/32Q/16D; Singles – Doubles	(Czechoslovakia) Helena Suková (Commonwealth of Independent States) Natasha Zvereva; 7–6^{(7–5)}, 6–4	(United States) Martina Navratilova (United States) Pam Shriver	(Czechoslovakia) Jana Novotná (United States) Patty Fendick	(Austria) Judith Wiesner (Czechoslovakia) Andrea Strnadová (United States) Zina Garrison-Jackson (Bulgaria) Magdalena Maleeva
Oct 12	Porsche Tennis Grand Prix; Filderstadt, Germany; WTA Tier II; Carpet (i) – $350,000 – 32S/32Q/16D; Singles – Doubles	(United States) Martina Navratilova; 7–6^{(7–1)}, 6–3	(Argentina) Gabriela Sabatini	(United States) Mary Joe Fernández (Spain) Arantxa Sánchez Vicario	(Germany) Wiltrud Probst (Germany) Anke Huber (Czechoslovakia) Helena Suková (Austria) Judith Wiesner
Oct 12	Porsche Tennis Grand Prix; Filderstadt, Germany; WTA Tier II; Carpet (i) – $350,000 – 32S/32Q/16D; Singles – Doubles	(Spain) Arantxa Sánchez Vicario (Czechoslovakia) Helena Suková; 6–4, 7–5	(United States) Pam Shriver (Commonwealth of Independent States) Natasha Zvereva	(United States) Mary Joe Fernández (Spain) Arantxa Sánchez Vicario	(Germany) Wiltrud Probst (Germany) Anke Huber (Czechoslovakia) Helena Suková (Austria) Judith Wiesner
Oct 19	Midland Bank Championships; Brighton, Great Britain; WTA Tier II; Carpet (i) – $350,000 – 32S/32Q/16D; Singles – Doubles	(Germany) Steffi Graf; 4–6, 6–4, 7–6^{(7–3)}	(Czechoslovakia) Jana Novotná	(Germany) Anke Huber (United States) Mary Joe Fernández	(United States) Lori McNeil (France) Pascale Paradis (Spain) Conchita Martínez (France) Nathalie Tauziat
Oct 19	Midland Bank Championships; Brighton, Great Britain; WTA Tier II; Carpet (i) – $350,000 – 32S/32Q/16D; Singles – Doubles	(Czechoslovakia) Jana Novotná (Latvia) Larisa Neiland; 6–4, 6–1	(Spain) Conchita Martínez (Czechoslovakia) Radka Zrubáková	(Germany) Anke Huber (United States) Mary Joe Fernández	(United States) Lori McNeil (France) Pascale Paradis (Spain) Conchita Martínez (France) Nathalie Tauziat
Oct 26	Puerto Rico Open; San Juan, Puerto Rico; WTA Tier IV; Hard – $150,000 – 32S/32Q/16D; Singles – Doubles	(France) Mary Pierce; 6–1, 7–5	(United States) Gigi Fernández	(United States) Louise Allen (United States) Debbie Graham	(United States) Nicole Arendt (United States) Ginger Helgeson (United States) Lisa Raymond (South Africa) Amanda Coetzer
Oct 26	Puerto Rico Open; San Juan, Puerto Rico; WTA Tier IV; Hard – $150,000 – 32S/32Q/16D; Singles – Doubles	(South Africa) Amanda Coetzer (South Africa) Elna Reinach; 6–2, 4–6, 6–2	(United States) Gigi Fernández (United States) Kathy Rinaldi	(United States) Louise Allen (United States) Debbie Graham	(United States) Nicole Arendt (United States) Ginger Helgeson (United States) Lisa Raymond (South Africa) Amanda Coetzer

=== November ===
Week	Tournament	Champions	Runners-up	Semifinalists	Quarterfinalists
Nov 2	Bank of the West Classic; Oakland, United States; WTA Tier II; Carpet (i) – $350,000 – 32S/16D; Singles – Doubles	(Federal Republic of Yugoslavia) Monica Seles; 6–3, 6–4	(United States) Martina Navratilova	(Germany) Anke Huber (Bulgaria) Katerina Maleeva	(Croatia) Iva Majoli (United States) Pam Shriver (United States) Patty Fendick (Commonwealth of Independent States) Natasha Zvereva
Nov 2	Bank of the West Classic; Oakland, United States; WTA Tier II; Carpet (i) – $350,000 – 32S/16D; Singles – Doubles	(United States) Gigi Fernández (Commonwealth of Independent States) Natasha Zvereva; 3–6, 6–2, 6–4	(South Africa) Rosalyn Fairbank-Nideffer (United States) Gretchen Magers	(Germany) Anke Huber (Bulgaria) Katerina Maleeva	(Croatia) Iva Majoli (United States) Pam Shriver (United States) Patty Fendick (Commonwealth of Independent States) Natasha Zvereva
Nov 9	Indianapolis Tennis Classic; Indianapolis, United States; WTA Tier IV; Hard (i) – $150,000 – 32S/32Q/16D; Singles – Doubles	(Czechoslovakia) Helena Suková; 6–4, 6–3	(United States) Linda Harvey-Wild	(Chinese Taipei) Wang Shi-ting (Bulgaria) Katerina Maleeva	(Germany) Marketa Kochta (United States) Tami Whitlinger (Peru) Laura Gildemeister (Croatia) Iva Majoli
Nov 9	Indianapolis Tennis Classic; Indianapolis, United States; WTA Tier IV; Hard (i) – $150,000 – 32S/32Q/16D; Singles – Doubles	(United States) Katrina Adams (South Africa) Elna Reinach; 5–7, 6–2, 6–4	(United States) Sandy Collins (United States) Mary Lou Daniels	(Chinese Taipei) Wang Shi-ting (Bulgaria) Katerina Maleeva	(Germany) Marketa Kochta (United States) Tami Whitlinger (Peru) Laura Gildemeister (Croatia) Iva Majoli
Nov 9	Virginia Slims of Philadelphia; Philadelphia, United States; WTA Tier II; Carpet (i) – $350,000 – 32S/32Q/16D; Singles – Doubles	(Germany) Steffi Graf; 6–3, 3–6, 6–1	(Spain) Arantxa Sánchez Vicario	(United States) Jennifer Capriati (Argentina) Gabriela Sabatini	(Spain) Conchita Martínez (United States) Lori McNeil (Commonwealth of Independent States) Natasha Zvereva (United States) Lisa Raymond
Nov 9	Virginia Slims of Philadelphia; Philadelphia, United States; WTA Tier II; Carpet (i) – $350,000 – 32S/32Q/16D; Singles – Doubles	(United States) Gigi Fernández (Commonwealth of Independent States) Natasha Zvereva; 6–1, 6–3	(Spain) Conchita Martínez (France) Mary Pierce	(United States) Jennifer Capriati (Argentina) Gabriela Sabatini	(Spain) Conchita Martínez (United States) Lori McNeil (Commonwealth of Independent States) Natasha Zvereva (United States) Lisa Raymond
Nov 16	Virginia Slims Championships; New York City, United States; Year-end Championship; Carpet (i) – $3,000,000 – 16S/8D; Singles – Doubles	(Federal Republic of Yugoslavia) Monica Seles; 7–5, 6–3, 6–1	(United States) Martina Navratilova	(Argentina) Gabriela Sabatini (United States) Lori McNeil	(Czechoslovakia) Jana Novotná (United States) Jennifer Capriati (Spain) Arantxa Sánchez Vicario (Spain) Conchita Martínez
Nov 16	Virginia Slims Championships; New York City, United States; Year-end Championship; Carpet (i) – $3,000,000 – 16S/8D; Singles – Doubles	(Spain) Arantxa Sánchez Vicario (Czechoslovakia) Helena Suková; 7–6^{(7–4)}, 6–1	(Czechoslovakia) Jana Novotná (Latvia) Larisa Neiland	(Argentina) Gabriela Sabatini (United States) Lori McNeil	(Czechoslovakia) Jana Novotná (United States) Jennifer Capriati (Spain) Arantxa Sánchez Vicario (Spain) Conchita Martínez

== Rankings ==
Below are the 1992 WTA year-end rankings (November 23, 1992) in both singles and doubles competition:

Singles Year-end Ranking
No	Player Name	Points	1991	Change
1	Monica Seles (FRY)	283.9373	1	=
2	Steffi Graf (GER)	252.1627	2	=
3	Gabriela Sabatini (ARG)	192.6851	3	=
4	Arantxa Sánchez Vicario (ESP)	177.4134	5	+1
5	Martina Navratilova (USA)	171.1923	4	-1
6	Mary Joe Fernández (USA)	120.6983	8	+2
7	Jennifer Capriati (USA)	98.0787	6	-1
8	Conchita Martínez (ESP)	96.8043	9	+1
9	Manuela Maleeva-Fragnière (SUI)	81.4120	10	+1
10	Jana Novotná (TCH)	78.1221	7	-3
11	Anke Huber (GER)	66.5333	14	+3
12	Helena Suková (TCH)	66.2358	17	+5
13	Mary Pierce (FRA)	64.8333	26	+13
14	Nathalie Tauziat (FRA)	59.0709	13	-1
15	Lori McNeil (USA)	58.5140	19	+4
16	Katerina Maleeva (BUL)	73.0000	11	-5
17	Amanda Coetzer (RSA)	55.5200	67	+50
18	Zina Garrison (USA)	54.4668	12	-6
19	Amy Frazier (USA)	54.0471	28	+9
20	Magdalena Maleeva (BUL)	53.0533	38	+18

Doubles Year-end Ranking
No	Player Name	Points	1991	Change
1	Helena Suková (TCH)	379.1698	8	+7
2	Natasha Zvereva (CIS)	365.6969	3	+1
3	Arantxa Sánchez Vicario (ESP)	361.0473	7	+4
4	Jana Novotná (TCH)	341.6629	1	-3
5	Larisa Neiland (LAT)	302.8403	2	-3
6	Gigi Fernández (USA)	287.7661	4	-2
7	Pam Shriver (USA)	237.5612	9	+2
8	Conchita Martínez (ESP)	234.1818	51	+43
9	Martina Navratilova (USA)	218.4310	6	-3
10	Zina Garrison (USA)	191.2420	12	+2
11	Mary Joe Fernández (USA)	173.0831	5	-6
12	Stephanie Rehe (USA)	166.5833	45	+33
13	Rennae Stubbs (AUS)	157.7778	72	+59
14	Lori McNeil (USA)	153.5263	19	+5
15	Kathy Rinaldi (USA)	138.8265	20	+5
16	Patty Fendick (USA)	138.6667	10	-6
17	Jill Hetherington (CAN)	136.1861	13	-4
18	Katrina Adams (USA)	129.2250	16	-2
19	Manon Bollegraf (NED)	126.4335	23	+4
20	Rachel McQuillan (AUS)	124.9167	31	+11

== See also ==
- 1992 ATP Tour
