= 1992 Indianapolis Tennis Classic =

- Date: November 9–14
- Edition: 14th
- Category: Tier IV
- Draw: 32S / 16D
- Prize money: $150,000
- Surface: Hard / intdoor
- Location: Indianapolis, Indiana, U.S.
- Venue: Indianapolis Racquet Club

Champions

Singles
- (Czechoslovakia) Helena Suková

Doubles
- (United States) Katrina Adams / (South Africa) Elna Reinach
← 1991 ·	Virginia Slims of Indianapolis

The 1992 Indianapolis Tennis Classic was a women's tennis tournament played on indoor hard courts at the Indianapolis Racquet Club in Indianapolis, Indiana in the United States and was part of the Tier IV category of the 1992 WTA Tour. It was the 14th edition of the tournament and ran from November 9 through November 14, 1992. Fourth-seeded Katerina Maleeva won the singles title and earned $27,000 first-prize money.

== Finals ==
=== Singles ===
(Czechoslovakia) Helena Suková defeated (United States) Linda Harvey-Wild 6–4, 6–3

- It was Suková's 2nd singles title of the year and the 10th of her career.

=== Doubles ===
(United States) Katrina Adams / (South Africa) Elna Reinach defeated (United States) Sandy Collins / (United States) Mary Lou Daniels 5–7, 6–2, 6–4
