= 1992 Virginia Slims of Oklahoma – Doubles =

Doubles
- 1992 Virginia Slims of Oklahoma

Final
- Champions: (United States) Lori McNeil (Australia) Nicole Provis
- Runners-up: (United States) Katrina Adams (Netherlands) Manon Bollegraf
- Score: 3–6, 6–4, 7–6^{(8–6)}

Details
- Draw: 16 (1WC/1Q)
- Seeds: 4

Events
Singles	Doubles
← 1991 ·	U.S. National Indoor Championships	· 1993 →

Meredith McGrath and Anne Smith were the defending champions, but none competed this year.

Lori McNeil and Nicole Provis won the title by defeating Katrina Adams and Manon Bollegraf 3–6, 6–4, 7–6^{(8–6)} in the final.

== Seeds ==
1. (United States) Lori McNeil / (Australia) Nicole Provis (champions)
2. (United States) Sandy Collins / (South Africa) Elna Reinach (quarterfinals)
3. (Canada) Jill Hetherington / (United States) Kathy Rinaldi (semifinals)
4. (United States) Gigi Fernández / (United States) Robin White (quarterfinals)

== Draw ==
=== Key ===
- Q = Qualifier
- WC = Wild card
- LL = Lucky loser
- Alt = Alternate
- SE = Special exempt
- PR = Protected ranking
- ITF = ITF entry
- JE = Junior exempt
- w/o = Walkover
- r = Retired
- d = Defaulted
- SR = Special ranking

=== Draw ===
First round
1	(United States) L McNeil (Australia) N Provis	6	6
(Australia) K Godridge (Australia) KA Guse	0	1
(United States) ML Daniels (South Africa) L Gregory	3	6	7^{7}
(United States) B Bowes (United States) W Prausa	6	3	6^{2}
3	(Canada) J Hetherington (United States) K Rinaldi	6	3	6
(United States) H Ludloff (United States) T Whitlinger	1	6	4
(United States) A Frazier (Japan) R Hiraki	6	6
(United States) D Graham (Australia) R Stubbs	3	1
(United States) N Arendt (Mexico) L Novelo	5	4
WC	(United States) S Sampras (United States) J Santrock	7	6
(United States) P Harper (Netherlands) C Vis	2	1
4	(United States) G Fernández (United States) R White	6	6
(United States) K Adams (Netherlands) M Bollegraf	6	6
(United States) A Grossman (United States) A Keller	2	0
Q	(United States) H Cioffi (United States) S Sloane-Lundy	1	0
2	(United States) S Collins (South Africa) E Reinach	6	6

Quarterfinals
1	(United States) L McNeil (Australia) N Provis	7^{7}	6
(United States) ML Daniels (South Africa) L Gregory	6^{2}	4
3	(Canada) J Hetherington (United States) K Rinaldi	6	4	6
(United States) A Frazier (Japan) R Hiraki	1	6	3
WC	(United States) S Sampras (United States) J Santrock	6	6
4	(United States) G Fernández (United States) R White	3	3
(United States) K Adams (Netherlands) M Bollegraf	6	6
2	(United States) S Collins (South Africa) E Reinach	4	2

Semifinals
1	(United States) L McNeil (Australia) N Provis	6	2	7^{7}
3	(Canada) J Hetherington (United States) K Rinaldi	2	6	6^{4}
WC	(United States) S Sampras (United States) J Santrock	4	2
(United States) K Adams (Netherlands) M Bollegraf	6	6

Final
1	(United States) L McNeil (Australia) N Provis	3	6	7^{8}
(United States) K Adams (Netherlands) M Bollegraf	6	4	6^{6}
