= 1992 Citroën Cup Austrian Ladies Open – Doubles =

Doubles
- 1992 Citroën Cup Austrian Ladies Open

Final
- Champions: (France) Florencia Labat (France) Alexia Dechaume
- Runners-up: (South Africa) Amanda Coetzer (Germany) Wiltrud Probst
- Score: 6–3, 6–3

Details
- Draw: 16 (1WC/1Q)
- Seeds: 4

Events
Singles	Doubles
- WTA Austrian Open

Bettina Fulco-Villella and Nicole Muns-Jagerman were the defending champions, but lost in the first round to Louise Field and Tracey Morton.

Florencia Labat and Alexia Dechaume won the title by defeating Amanda Coetzer and Wiltrud Probst 6–3, 6–3 in the final.

== Seeds ==
1. (Argentina) Florencia Labat / (France) Alexia Dechaume (champions)
2. (South Africa) Amanda Coetzer / (Germany) Wiltrud Probst (final)
3. (Argentina) Bettina Fulco-Villella / (Netherlands) Nicole Muns-Jagerman (first round)
4. (Italy) Sandra Cecchini / (Switzerland) Manuela Maleeva-Fragnière (first round)

== Draw ==
Key

- Q = Qualifier
- WC = Wild card
- LL = Lucky loser
- Alt = Alternate
- ITF = ITF entry
- PR = Protected ranking
- SR = Special ranking
- SE = Special exempt
- JE = Junior exempt
- JR = Junior Accelerator Programme entrant
- CO = College Accelerator Programme entrant
- NG = Next Gen Accelerator Program entrant
- w/o = Walkover
- r = Retired
- d = Defaulted

=== Draw ===
First round
1	(Argentina) F Labat (France) A Dechaume	6	6
(Netherlands) C Bakkum (Sweden) M Strandlund	1	2
(Czechoslovakia) J Pospíšilová (Czechoslovakia) D Szabová	6^{7}	2
WC	(Austria) N Dobrovits (Austria) S Dopfer	7^{9}	6
4	(Italy) S Cecchini (Switzerland) M Maleeva-Fragnière	6	2	3
(Finland) P Thorén (Finland) N Dahlman	1	6	6
(Czechoslovakia) E Švíglerová (France) N van Lottum	6
(Commonwealth of Independent States) V Milvidskaia (Australia) K Sharpe	2	r
(Czechoslovakia) E Melicharová (Czechoslovakia) I Jankovská	4	1
(Netherlands) I Driehuis (Australia) L Pleming	6	6
(Australia) L Field (Australia) T Morton	6	6
3	(Argentina) B Fulco-Villella (Netherlands) N Muns-Jagerman	3	4
(Germany) H Kadzidroga (Czechoslovakia) M Kratochvílová	6	4	4
Q	(Germany) R Kochta (Germany) V Martinek	4	6	6
(Germany) S Frankl (Germany) S Meier	2	2
2	(South Africa) A Coetzer (Germany) W Probst	6	6

Quarterfinals
1	(Argentina) F Labat (France) A Dechaume	6	6
WC	(Austria) N Dobrovits (Austria) S Dopfer	1	3
(Finland) P Thorén (Finland) N Dahlman	1	6	3
(Czechoslovakia) E Švíglerová (France) N van Lottum	6	4	6
(Netherlands) I Driehuis (Australia) L Pleming	6	6
(Australia) L Field (Australia) T Morton	1	4
Q	(Germany) R Kochta (Germany) V Martinek	4	6	3
2	(South Africa) A Coetzer (Germany) W Probst	6	2	6

Semifinals
1	(Argentina) F Labat (France) A Dechaume	6	6
(Czechoslovakia) E Švíglerová (France) N van Lottum	3	2
(Netherlands) I Driehuis (Australia) L Pleming	3	3
2	(South Africa) A Coetzer (Germany) W Probst	6	6

Final
1	(Argentina) F Labat (France) A Dechaume	6	6
2	(South Africa) A Coetzer (Germany) W Probst	3	3
