= 1993 Bank of the West Classic – Singles =

Singles
- 1993 Bank of the West Classic

Final
- Champion: (United States) Martina Navratilova
- Runner-up: (United States) Zina Garrison-Jackson
- Score: 6–2, 7–6^{(7–1)}

Details
- Draw: 28 (2WC)
- Seeds: 8

Events
Singles	Doubles
← 1992 ·	Silicon Valley Classic	· 1994 →

Monica Seles was the defending champion, but didn't play for the remainder of this season after being stabbed in the back in Hamburg.

Martina Navratilova won the title by defeating Zina Garrison-Jackson 6–2, 7–6^{(7–1)} in the final.

== Seeds ==
The first four seeds receive a bye into the second round.

1. (United States) Martina Navratilova (champion)
2. (United States) Mary Joe Fernández (quarterfinals)
3. (United States) Zina Garrison-Jackson (final)
4. (United States) Lindsay Davenport (semifinals)
5. (United States) Patty Fendick (first round)
6. (United States) Lori McNeil (semifinals)
7. (United States) Ann Grossman (quarterfinals)
8. (Croatia) Iva Majoli (quarterfinals)

== Draw ==
=== Key ===
- Q = Qualifier
- WC = Wild card
- LL = Lucky loser
- Alt = Alternate
- SE = Special exempt
- PR = Protected ranking
- ITF = ITF entry
- JE = Junior exempt
- w/o = Walkover
- r = Retired
- d = Defaulted
- SR = Special ranking

=== Finals ===
Semifinals
1	(United States) Martina Navratilova	1	6	7
4	(United States) Lindsay Davenport	6	3	5
3	(United States) Zina Garrison Jackson	7	6
6	(United States) Lori McNeil	5	2

Final
1	(United States) Martina Navratilova	6	7^{7}
3	(United States) Zina Garrison Jackson	2	6^{1}

=== Top half ===
First round
(United States) M Werdel	6	4	6
(Germany) M Kochta	3	6	4
(United States) A Henricksson	3	6	2
(United States) A Frazier	6	4	6
(United States) S Stafford	5	3
8	(Croatia) I Majoli	7	6
(United States) T Whitlinger	0	1
(United States) G Helgeson	6	6
(United States) J Watanabe	4	2
(United States) C Kuhlman	6	6
(United States) K Po	4	7	6
5	(United States) P Fendick	6	5	4

Second round
1	(United States) M Navratilova	6	7^{8}
(United States) M Werdel	4	6^{6}
(United States) A Frazier	3	4
8	(Croatia) I Majoli	6	6
4	(United States) L Davenport	6^{0}	6	6
(United States) G Helgeson	7^{7}	2	3
(United States) C Kuhlman	6	7
(United States) K Po	2	5

Quarterfinals
1	(United States) M Navratilova	3	6	6
8	(Croatia) I Majoli	6	3	2
4	(United States) L Davenport	7	6
(United States) C Kuhlman	5	2

Semifinals
1	(United States) M Navratilova	1	6	7
4	(United States) L Davenport	6	3	5

=== Bottom half ===
First round
7	(United States) A Grossman	6	6
(United States) S Cacic	4	1
(Japan) R Hiraki	6	6
(United States) S McCarthy	4	0
WC	(United States) T Austin	6	3	7
(Belarus) T Ignatieva	4	6	5
6	(United States) L McNeil	6	6
WC	(United States) A Basica	4	2
(Paraguay) R de los Ríos	6	6
(Hungary) A Temesvári	4	2
(United States) R White	1	6	2
(United States) M McGrath	6	2	6

Second round
7	(United States) A Grossman	6	6
(Japan) R Hiraki	4	3
WC	(United States) T Austin	0	2
3	(United States) Z Garrison-Jackson	6	6
6	(United States) L McNeil	6	6
(Paraguay) R de los Ríos	4	1
(United States) M McGrath	1	3
2	(United States) MJ Fernández	6	6

Quarterfinals
7	(United States) A Grossman	4	3
3	(United States) Z Garrison-Jackson	6	6
6	(United States) L McNeil	4	7	6
2	(United States) MJ Fernández	6	5	3

Semifinals
3	(United States) Z Garrison-Jackson	7	6
6	(United States) L McNeil	5	2
