= 1992 Indianapolis Tennis Classic – Singles =

Singles
- 1992 Indianapolis Tennis Classic

Final
- Champion: (Czechoslovakia) Helena Suková
- Runner-up: (United States) Linda Harvey Wild
- Score: 6–4, 6–3

Details
- Draw: 32 (2WC/4Q/1LL)
- Seeds: 8

Events
Singles	Doubles
← 1991 ·	Virginia Slims of Indianapolis

Katerina Maleeva was the defending champion, but lost in the semifinals to Linda Harvey Wild.

Helena Suková won the title by defeating Harvey Wild 6–4, 6–3 in the final.

== Seeds ==
1. (Germany) Anke Huber (second round)
2. (France) Nathalie Tauziat (second round)
3. (Bulgaria) Katerina Maleeva (semifinals)
4. (Czechoslovakia) Helena Suková (champion)
5. (Commonwealth of Independent States) Natalia Medvedeva (first round)
6. (Peru) Laura Gildemeister (quarterfinals)
7. (United States) Linda Harvey Wild (final)
8. (Argentina) Inés Gorrochategui (first round)

== Draw ==
=== Key ===
- Q = Qualifier
- WC = Wild card
- LL = Lucky loser
- Alt = Alternate
- SE = Special exempt
- PR = Protected ranking
- ITF = ITF entry
- JE = Junior exempt
- w/o = Walkover
- r = Retired
- d = Defaulted
- SR = Special ranking

=== Finals ===
Semifinals
(Chinese Taipei) Wang Shi-ting	3	3
4	(Czechoslovakia) Helena Suková	6	6
3	(Bulgaria) Katerina Maleeva	4	5
7	(United States) Linda Harvey Wild	6	7

Final
4	(Czechoslovakia) Helena Suková	6	6
7	(United States) Linda Harvey Wild	4	3

=== Top half ===
First round
1	(Germany) A Huber	7^{7}	6
(United States) A Keller	6^{3}	4
Q	(United States) Te Whitlinger	1	1
(Chinese Taipei) S-t Wang	6	6
(Argentina) M Paz	3	4
(Germany) M Kochta	6	6
(Finland) P Thorén	7^{7}	6
5	(Commonwealth of Independent States) N Medvedeva	6^{4}	3
4	(Czechoslovakia) H Suková	6	6
(United States) C Cunningham	1	3
Q	(Mexico) A Gavaldón	6	6
WC	(United States) H Lord	0	1
Q	(United States) S McCarthy	6^{7}	2
(United States) Ta Whitlinger	7^{9}	6
(United States) G Helgeson	6	6
8	(Argentina) I Gorrochategui	3	3

Second round
1	(Germany) A Huber	2	3
(Chinese Taipei) S-t Wang	6	6
(Germany) M Kochta	6^{7}	6	6
(Finland) P Thorén	7^{9}	4	2
4	(Czechoslovakia) H Suková	7^{9}	6
Q	(Mexico) A Gavaldón	6^{7}	4
(United States) Ta Whitlinger	6	6
(United States) G Helgeson	2	3

Quarterfinals
(Chinese Taipei) S-t Wang	7^{7}	1	7
(Germany) M Kochta	6^{5}	6	5
4	(Czechoslovakia) H Suková	6	6
(United States) Ta Whitlinger	2	2

Semifinals
(Chinese Taipei) S-t Wang	3	3
4	(Czechoslovakia) H Suková	6	6

=== Bottom half ===
First round
6	(Peru) L Gildemeister	6	6
WC	(United States) S Reece	3	4
(Canada) H Kelesi	6	7^{7}
(Germany) M Babel	3	6^{3}
(United States) J Santrock	3	1
(United States) C Rubin	6	6
(United States) H Cioffi	1	2
3	(Bulgaria) K Maleeva	6	6
7	(United States) L Harvey Wild	6	6
Q	(United States) ML Daniels	0	3
LL	(Netherlands) M Kiene	6	4	2
(United States) K Adams	3	6	6
(Croatia) I Majoli	7	0	6
(South Africa) E Reinach	5	6	2
(United States) D Faber	2	2
2	(France) N Tauziat	6	6

Second round
6	(Peru) L Gildemeister	6	1
(Canada) H Kelesi	1	0^{r}
(United States) C Rubin	1	2
3	(Bulgaria) K Maleeva	6	6
7	(United States) L Harvey Wild	6	6
(United States) K Adams	4	1
(Croatia) I Majoli	6	6
2	(France) N Tauziat	3	3

Quarterfinals
6	(Peru) L Gildemeister	0	2
3	(Bulgaria) K Maleeva	6	6
7	(United States) L Harvey Wild	4	6	6
(Croatia) I Majoli	6	2	4

Semifinals
3	(Bulgaria) K Maleeva	4	5
7	(United States) L Harvey Wild	6	7
