= 1992 Nutri-Metics Bendon Classic =

- Date: 27 January – 2 February
- Edition: 7th
- Category: Tier V
- Draw: 32S / 16D
- Prize money: $100,000
- Surface: Hard / outdoor
- Location: Auckland, New Zealand
- Venue: ASB Tennis Centre

Champions

Singles
- (United States) Robin White

Doubles
- (South Africa) Rosalyn Fairbank-Nideffer (Italy) Raffaella Reggi-Concato
← 1991 ·	WTA Auckland Open	· 1993 →

The 1992 Nutri-Metics Bendon Classic was a women's tennis tournament played on outdoor hard courts at the ASB Tennis Centre in Auckland in New Zealand that was part of Tier V of the 1992 WTA Tour. It was the seventh edition of the tournament and was held from 27 January through to 2 February 1992. Unseeded Robin White won the singles title.

== Finals ==
=== Singles ===
(United States) Robin White defeated (Czechoslovakia) Andrea Strnadová 2–6, 6–4, 6–3

- It was White's second WTA title of her career.

=== Doubles ===
(South Africa) Rosalyn Fairbank-Nideffer / (Italy) Raffaella Reggi-Concato defeated (Canada) Jill Hetherington / (United States) Kathy Rinaldi 1–6, 6–1, 7–5

== See also ==
- 1992 Benson and Hedges Open – men's tournament
