= 1992 Citroën Cup Austrian Ladies Open =

- Date: 6–12 July
- Edition: 20th
- Category: Tier IV
- Draw: 32S / 16D
- Prize money: $150,000
- Surface: Clay / outdoor
- Location: Kitzbühel, Austria
- Venue: Tennis Club Chizzo

Champions

Singles
- (Spain) Conchita Martínez

Doubles
- (France) Florencia Labat / (France) Alexia Dechaume
← 1991 ·	WTA Austrian Open	· 1993 →

The 1992 Citroën Cup Austrian Ladies Open was a women's tennis tournament played on outdoor clay courts at the Tennis Club Chizzo in Kitzbühel, Austria that was part of the Tier IV category of the 1992 WTA Tour. It was the 20th edition of the tournament and was held from 6 July until 12 July 1992. First-seeded Conchita Martínez won her second consecutive singles title at the event and earned $27,000 first-prize money.

== Finals ==
=== Singles ===
(Spain) Conchita Martínez defeated (Switzerland) Manuela Maleeva-Fragnière 6–0, 3–6, 6–2

- It was Martínez's only singles title of the year and the 11th of her career.

=== Doubles ===
(France) Florencia Labat / (France) Alexia Dechaume defeated (South Africa) Amanda Coetzer / (Germany) Wiltrud Probst 6–3, 6–3

- It was Labat's 1st doubles title of the year and the 3rd of her career. It was Dechaume's 1st doubles title of the year and the 3rd of her career.
