= 1992 Indianapolis Tennis Classic – Doubles =

Doubles
- 1992 Indianapolis Tennis Classic

Final
- Champions: (United States) Katrina Adams (South Africa) Elna Reinach
- Runners-up: (United States) Sandy Collins (United States) Mary Lou Daniels
- Score: 5–7, 6–2, 6–4

Details
- Draw: 16 (1WC/1Q)
- Seeds: 4

Events
Singles	Doubles
← 1991 ·	Virginia Slims of Indianapolis

Patty Fendick and Gigi Fernández were the defending champions, but none competed this year. Fernández chose to compete at Philadelphia during the same week, winning that title alongside Natasha Zvereva.

Katrina Adams and Elna Reinach won the title by defeating Sandy Collins and Mary Lou Daniels 5–7, 6–2, 6–4 in the final.

== Seeds ==
1. (United States) Katrina Adams / (South Africa) Elna Reinach (champions)
2. (Commonwealth of Independent States) Natalia Medvedeva / (Argentina) Mercedes Paz (first round)
3. (United States) Sandy Collins / (United States) Mary Lou Daniels (final)
4. (United States) Linda Harvey Wild / (Germany) Claudia Kohde-Kilsch (semifinals)

== Draw ==
=== Key ===
- Q = Qualifier
- WC = Wild card
- LL = Lucky loser
- Alt = Alternate
- SE = Special exempt
- PR = Protected ranking
- ITF = ITF entry
- JE = Junior exempt
- w/o = Walkover
- r = Retired
- d = Defaulted
- SR = Special ranking

=== Draw ===
First round
1	(United States) K Adams (South Africa) E Reinach	6	6
(Peru) L Gildemeister (Argentina) I Gorrochategui	2	3
(United States) Ta Whitlinger (United States) Te Whitlinger	6^{5}	6	3
(United States) L Allen (United States) A Henricksson	7^{7}	0	6
4	(United States) L Harvey Wild (Germany) C Kohde-Kilsch	6	7
Q	(Netherlands) K Boogert (Germany) M Kochta	3	5
(United States) C Benjamin (United States) C Cunningham	6^{4}	6	6
(United States) G Helgeson (United States) S McCarthy	7^{7}	4	4
(United States) H Cioffi (United States) A Keller	3	6	6
(United States) J Emmons (Netherlands) M Kiene	6	1	2
WC	(United States) M Jackson-Nobrega (United States) S Reece	5	3
3	(United States) S Collins (United States) ML Daniels	7	6
(Germany) M Babel (Finland) P Thorén	6	7^{9}
(France) S Amiach (Argentina) MJ Gaidano	4	6^{7}
(United States) L Davenport (United States) C Rubin	4	6	7
2	(Commonwealth of Independent States) N Medvedeva (Argentina) M Paz	6	4	5

Quarterfinals
1	(United States) K Adams (South Africa) E Reinach	6	6
(United States) L Allen (United States) A Henricksson	1	0
4	(United States) L Harvey Wild (Germany) C Kohde-Kilsch	6	6
(United States) C Benjamin (United States) C Cunningham	3	4
(United States) H Cioffi (United States) A Keller	5	2
3	(United States) S Collins (United States) ML Daniels	7	6
(Germany) M Babel (Finland) P Thorén	5	6^{0}
(United States) L Davenport (United States) C Rubin	7	7^{7}

Semifinals
1	(United States) K Adams (South Africa) E Reinach	6	6
4	(United States) L Harvey Wild (Germany) C Kohde-Kilsch	2	2
3	(United States) S Collins (United States) ML Daniels	6	6
(United States) L Davenport (United States) C Rubin	4	4

Final
1	(United States) K Adams (South Africa) E Reinach	5	6	6
3	(United States) S Collins (United States) ML Daniels	7	2	4
