= 1993 Bank of the West Classic – Doubles =

Doubles
- 1993 Bank of the West Classic

Final
- Champions: (United States) Patty Fendick; (United States) Meredith McGrath
- Runners-up: (South Africa) Amanda Coetzer; (Argentina) Inés Gorrochategui
- Score: 6–2, 6–0

Details
- Draw: 16 (1WC)
- Seeds: 4

Events
Singles	Doubles
← 1992 ·	Bank of the West Classic	· 1994 →

Gigi Fernández and Natasha Zvereva were the defending champions, but none competed this year.

Patty Fendick and Meredith McGrath won the title by defeating Amanda Coetzer and Inés Gorrochategui 6–2, 6–0 in the final.

== Seeds ==
1. (United States) Mary Joe Fernández / (United States) Zina Garrison-Jackson (quarterfinals)
2. (United States) Patty Fendick / (United States) Meredith McGrath (champions)
3. (South Africa) Amanda Coetzer / (Argentina) Inés Gorrochategui (final)
4. (Canada) Jill Hetherington / (United States) Kathy Rinaldi (semifinals)

== Draw ==
=== Key ===
- Q = Qualifier
- WC = Wild card
- LL = Lucky loser
- Alt = Alternate
- SE = Special exempt
- PR = Protected ranking
- ITF = ITF entry
- JE = Junior exempt
- w/o = Walkover
- r = Retired
- d = Defaulted
- SR = Special ranking

=== Draw ===
First round

Quarterfinals

Semifinals

Final

1
(United States) MJ Fernández
(United States) Z Garrison-Jackson
7^{9}
6

- (United States) K Po
- (United States) M Werdel
6^{7}
4

1
- (United States) MJ Fernández
- (United States) Z Garrison-Jackson
2
6
3

- (United States) A Frazier
- (Japan) R Hiraki
5
2

(United States) A Grossman
(New Zealand) J Richardson
6
3
6

(United States) A Grossman
(New Zealand) J Richardson
7
6

- (United States) A Grossman
- (New Zealand) J Richardson
4
0

3
(South Africa) A Coetzer
(Argentina) I Gorrochategui
7
3
7

3
(South Africa) A Coetzer
(Argentina) I Gorrochategui
6
6

WC
- (United States) P Nelson
- (United States) L Poruri
5
6
5

3
(South Africa) A Coetzer
(Argentina) I Gorrochategui
6
6

(United States) L Davenport
(United States) L McNeil
6
6

- (United States) L Davenport
- (United States) L McNeil
0
2

- (United States) H Ludloff
- (United States) S Stafford
1
4

3
- (South Africa) A Coetzer
- (Argentina) I Gorrochategui
2
0

(United States) G Helgeson
(Hungary) A Temesvári
6
6

2
(United States) P Fendick
(United States) M McGrath
6
6

- (Germany) M Kochta
- (United States) A Leand
1
2

- (United States) G Helgeson
- (Hungary) A Temesvári
4
1

- (United States) P Harper
- (United States) R White
5
6
4

4
(Canada) J Hetherington
(United States) K Rinaldi
6
6

4
(Canada) J Hetherington
(United States) K Rinaldi
7
4
6

4
- (Canada) J Hetherington
- (United States) K Rinaldi
1
4

(United States) G Magers
(South Africa) R Nideffer
6
7

2
(United States) P Fendick
(United States) M McGrath
6
6

- (United States) C Kuhlman
- (United States) S McCarthy
2
5

- (United States) G Magers
- (South Africa) R Nideffer
3
4

- (United States) E Hakami
- (United States) J Watanabe
3
6^{5}

2
(United States) P Fendick
(United States) M McGrath
6
6

2
(United States) P Fendick
(United States) M McGrath
6
7^{7}
