= 1992 BMW European Indoors =

- Date: 5–11 October
- Edition: 9th
- Category: Tier II
- Draw: 32S / 16D
- Prize money: $350,000
- Surface: Carpet / indoor
- Location: Zürich, Switzerland
- Venue: Saalsporthalle Allmend

Champions

Singles
- (West Germany) Steffi Graf

Doubles
- (Czechoslovakia) Helena Suková / (Commonwealth of Independent States) Natasha Zvereva
- Zurich Open

The 1992 BMW European Indoors was a women's tennis tournament played on indoor carpet courts at the Saalsporthalle Allmend in Zürich in Switzerland and was part of Tier II of the 1992 WTA Tour. It was the ninth edition of the tournament and was held from 5 October through 11 October 1992. First-seeded Steffi Graf won the singles title, her sixth at the event, and earned $70,000 first-prize money.

== Finals ==
=== Singles ===
(West Germany) Steffi Graf defeated (United States) Martina Navratilova 2–6, 7–5, 7–5

- It was Graf's 6th singles title of the year and the 67th of her career.

=== Doubles ===
(Czechoslovakia) Helena Suková / (Commonwealth of Independent States) Natasha Zvereva defeated (United States) Martina Navratilova / (United States) Pam Shriver 7–6^{(7–5)}, 6–4
