= 1992 Bank of the West Classic =

- Date: November 2–8
- Edition: 21st
- Category: Tier II
- Draw: 28S / 16D
- Prize money: $350,000
- Surface: Carpet / indoor
- Location: Oakland, California, U.S.
- Venue: Oakland Coliseum Arena

Champions

Singles
- (Federal Republic of Yugoslavia) Monica Seles

Doubles
- (United States) Gigi Fernández / (Commonwealth of Independent States) Natasha Zvereva
- Stanford Classic

The 1992 Bank of the West Classic was a women's tennis tournament played on indoor carpet courts at the Oakland Coliseum Arena in Oakland, California in the United States and was part of the Tier II category of the 1992 WTA Tour. It was the 21st edition of the tournament ran from November 2 through November 8, 1992. First-seeded Monica Seles won the singles title, her second at the event after 1990, and earned $70,000 first-prize money as well as 300 ranking points.

== Finals ==
=== Singles ===
(Federal Republic of Yugoslavia) Monica Seles defeated (United States) Martina Navratilova 6–3, 6–4

- It was Monica Seles' 9th singles title of the year and the 29th of her career.

=== Doubles ===
(United States) Gigi Fernández / (Commonwealth of Independent States) Natasha Zvereva defeated (South Africa) Rosalyn Fairbank-Nideffer / (United States) Gretchen Magers 3–6, 6–2, 6–4
