= 1992 Citroën Cup Austrian Ladies Open – Singles =

Singles
- 1992 Citroën Cup Austrian Ladies Open

Final
- Champion: (Spain) Conchita Martínez
- Runner-up: (Switzerland) Manuela Maleeva-Fragnière
- Score: 6–0, 3–6, 6–2

Details
- Draw: 32 (2WC/4Q)
- Seeds: 8

Events
Singles	Doubles
- WTA Austrian Open

Conchita Martínez successfully defended her title by defeating Manuela Maleeva-Fragnière 6–0, 3–6, 6–2 in the final.

== Seeds ==
1. (Spain) Conchita Martínez (champion)
2. (Switzerland) Manuela Maleeva-Fragnière (final)
3. (Austria) Judith Wiesner (quarterfinals)
4. (South Africa) Amanda Coetzer (semifinals)
5. (Czechoslovakia) Radka Zrubáková (second round)
6. (Italy) Sandra Cecchini (quarterfinals)
7. (Austria) Barbara Paulus (second round)
8. (Netherlands) Nicole Muns-Jagerman (first round)

== Draw ==
Key

- Q = Qualifier
- WC = Wild card
- LL = Lucky loser
- Alt = Alternate
- ITF = ITF entry
- PR = Protected ranking
- SR = Special ranking
- SE = Special exempt
- JE = Junior exempt
- JR = Junior Accelerator Programme entrant
- CO = College Accelerator Programme entrant
- NG = Next Gen Accelerator Program entrant
- w/o = Walkover
- r = Retired
- d = Defaulted

=== Finals ===
Semifinals
1	(Spain) Conchita Martínez	6	6
4	(South Africa) Amanda Coetzer	1	3
(Argentina) Florencia Labat	6	0	3
2	(Switzerland) Manuela Maleeva-Fragnière	4	6	6

Final
1	(Spain) Conchita Martínez	6	3	6
2	(Switzerland) Manuela Maleeva-Fragnière	0	6	2

=== Top half ===
First round
1	(Spain) C Martínez	6	6
Q	(Germany) H Thoms	1	2
(Switzerland) C Fauche	6	6
Q	(Slovenia) T Križan	4	1
(United States) D Faber	0	2
(France) A Dechaume	6	6
WC	(Austria) B Schett	3	4
7	(Austria) B Paulus	6	6
4	(South Africa) A Coetzer	6	6
(Argentina) B Fulco-Villella	2	3
(Germany) S Frankl	5	6	5
(Finland) P Thorén	7	1	7
(Germany) W Probst	6	6
Q	(Australia) T Morton	2	0
(France) N van Lottum	5	6	3
5	(Czechoslovakia) R Zrubáková	7	4	6

Second round
1	(Spain) C Martínez	6	6
(Switzerland) C Fauche	2	3
(France) A Dechaume	4	6	6
7	(Austria) B Paulus	6	4	2
4	(South Africa) A Coetzer	6	6
(Finland) P Thorén	1	0
(Germany) W Probst	4	6	6
5	(Czechoslovakia) R Zrubáková	6	0	4

Quarterfinals
1	(Spain) C Martínez	6	6
(France) A Dechaume	2	2
4	(South Africa) A Coetzer	7	6
(Germany) W Probst	5	2

Semifinals
1	(Spain) C Martínez	6	6
4	(South Africa) A Coetzer	1	3

=== Bottom half ===
First round
8	(Netherlands) N Muns-Jagerman	4	2
(Commonwealth of Independent States) E Brioukhovets	6	6
(Argentina) F Labat	6	6
WC	(Austria) N Dobrovits	1	4
(Finland) N Dahlman	6	4	3
(Czechoslovakia) E Švíglerová	4	6	6
(Germany) V Martinek	4	3
3	(Austria) J Wiesner	6	6
6	(Italy) S Cecchini	6	6
Q	(Commonwealth of Independent States) V Milvidskaia	1	2
(Germany) S Meier	4	6	6
(Sweden) M Strandlund	6	3	4
(Australia) L Field	7^{7}	3	4
(Czechoslovakia) D Szabová	6^{3}	6	6
(Austria) S Dopfer	2	2
2	(Switzerland) M Maleeva-Fragnière	6	6

Second round
(Commonwealth of Independent States) E Brioukhovets	3	0^{r}
(Argentina) F Labat	6	3
(Czechoslovakia) E Švíglerová	1	2
3	(Austria) J Wiesner	6	6
6	(Italy) S Cecchini	6	7
(Germany) S Meier	3	5
(Czechoslovakia) D Szabová	0	0
2	(Switzerland) M Maleeva-Fragnière	6	6

Quarterfinals
(Argentina) F Labat	6	6
3	(Austria) J Wiesner	2	1
6	(Italy) S Cecchini	2	3
2	(Switzerland) M Maleeva-Fragnière	6	6

Semifinals
(Argentina) F Labat	6	0	3
2	(Switzerland) M Maleeva-Fragnière	4	6	6
