= 1992 Virginia Slims of Oklahoma =

- Date: February 17–23
- Edition: 7th
- Category: Tier IV
- Draw: 32S / 16D
- Prize money: $150,000
- Surface: Hard / indoor
- Location: Oklahoma City, OK, U.S.
- Venue: The Greens Country Club

Champions

Singles
- (United States) Zina Garrison-Jackson

Doubles
- (United States) Lori McNeil / (Australia) Nicole Provis
← 1991 ·	Virginia Slims of Oklahoma	· 1993 →

The 1992 Virginia Slims of Oklahoma was a women's tennis tournament played on indoor hard courts at The Greens Country Club in Oklahoma City, Oklahoma in the United States that was part of Tier IV of the 1992 WTA Tour. It was the seventh edition of the tournament was held from February 17 through February 23, 1992. First-seeded Zina Garrison-Jackson won the singles title and earned $27,000 first-prize money.

== Finals ==
=== Singles ===
(United States) Zina Garrison defeated (United States) Lori McNeil 7–5, 3–6, 7–6^{(12–10)}

- It was Garrison-Jackson's 1st singles title of the year and the 11th of her career.

=== Doubles ===
(United States) Lori McNeil / (Australia) Nicole Provis defeated (United States) Katrina Adams / (Netherlands) Manon Bollegraf 3–6, 6–4, 7–6^{(8–6)}
