= 1993 Bank of the West Classic =

- Date: November 1–7
- Edition: 22nd
- Category: Tier II
- Draw: 28S / 16D
- Prize money: $375,000
- Surface: Carpet / indoor
- Location: Oakland, California, U.S.
- Venue: Oakland Coliseum Arena

Champions

Singles
- (United States) Martina Navratilova

Doubles
- (United States) Patty Fendick / (United States) Meredith McGrath
- Stanford Classic

The 1993 Bank of the West Classic was a women's tennis tournament played on indoor carpet courts at the Oakland Coliseum Arena in Oakland, California in the United States and was part of the Tier II category of the 1993 WTA Tour. It was the 22nd edition of the tournament ran from November 1 through November 7, 1993. First-seeded Martina Navratilova won the singles title, her fifth at the event after 1979, 1980, 1988 and 1991, and earned $75,000 first-prize money as well as 300 ranking points.

== Finals ==
=== Singles ===
(United States) Martina Navratilova defeated (United States) Zina Garrison-Jackson 6–2, 7–6^{(7–1)}

- It was Navratilova's 5th singles title of the year and the 166th of her career.

=== Doubles ===
(United States) Patty Fendick / (United States) Meredith McGrath defeated (South Africa) Amanda Coetzer / (Argentina) Inés Gorrochategui 6–2, 6–0
