= 1992 BMW European Indoors – Doubles =

Doubles
- 1992 BMW European Indoors

Final
- Champions: (Czechoslovakia) Helena Suková (Commonwealth of Independent States) Natasha Zvereva
- Runners-up: (United States) Martina Navratilova (United States) Pam Shriver
- Score: 7–6^{(7–5)}, 6–4

Details
- Draw: 16 (1WC)
- Seeds: 4

Events
Singles	Doubles
← 1991 ·	Zurich Open	· 1993 →

Jana Novotná and Andrea Strnadová were the defending champions, but competed this year with different partners. Novotná teamed up with Steffi Graf and lost in the semifinals to Helena Suková and Natasha Zvereva, while Strnadová teamed up with Patty Fendick and lost in the first round to Jo Durie and Brenda Schultz.

Suková and Zvereva won the title by defeating Martina Navratilova and Pam Shriver 7–6^{(7–5)}, 6–4 in the final.

== Seeds ==
1. (Czechoslovakia) Helena Suková / (Commonwealth of Independent States) Natasha Zvereva (champions)
2. (United States) Martina Navratilova / (United States) Pam Shriver (final)
3. (United States) Katrina Adams / (United States) Zina Garrison (semifinals)
4. (Germany) Steffi Graf / (Czechoslovakia) Jana Novotná (semifinals)

== Draw ==
=== Key ===
- Q = Qualifier
- WC = Wild card
- LL = Lucky loser
- Alt = Alternate
- ITF = ITF entry
- PR = Protected ranking
- SR = Special ranking
- SE = Special exempt
- JE = Junior exempt
- JR = Junior Accelerator Programme entrant
- CO = College Accelerator Programme entrant
- NG = Next Gen Accelerator Program entrant
- w/o = Walkover
- r = Retired
- d = Defaulted

=== Draw ===
First round
1	(Czechoslovakia) H Suková (Commonwealth of Independent States) N Zvereva	6	6
(United States) L Harvey Wild (Austria) J Wiesner	3	1
(Germany) W Probst (Germany) B Rittner	6	7
WC	(Italy) N Baudone (Switzerland) E Zardo	3	5
4	(Germany) S Graf (Czechoslovakia) J Novotná	6	6
(Peru) L Gildemeister (Czechoslovakia) K Habšudová	3	2
(Switzerland) M Strebel (Switzerland) N Tschan	4	5
(Italy) L Golarsa (Hungary) A Temesvári-Trunkos	6	7
(United Kingdom) J Durie (Netherlands) B Schultz	6	6
(United States) P Fendick (Czechoslovakia) A Strnadová	2	4
(Germany) C Kohde-Kilsch (United States) S Rehe	4	1
3	(United States) K Adams (United States) Z Garrison	6	6
(United States) L Allen (United States) A Henricksson	7^{9}	4	6
(Germany) R Kochta (Czechoslovakia) K Kroupová	6^{7}	6	1
(Bulgaria) M Maleeva (Switzerland) M Manuela-Fragnière
2	(United States) M Navratilova (United States) P Shriver	w/o

Quarterfinals
1	(Czechoslovakia) H Suková (Commonwealth of Independent States) N Zvereva	6	6
(Germany) W Probst (Germany) B Rittner	2	2
4	(Germany) S Graf (Czechoslovakia) J Novotná	6	7
(Italy) L Golarsa (Hungary) A Temesvári-Trunkos	1	5
(United Kingdom) J Durie (Netherlands) B Schultz	6^{4}	3
3	(United States) K Adams (United States) Z Garrison	7^{7}	6
(United States) L Allen (United States) A Henricksson	6^{3}	3
2	(United States) M Navratilova (United States) P Shriver	7^{7}	6

Semifinals
1	(Czechoslovakia) H Suková (Commonwealth of Independent States) N Zvereva	6	6
4	(Germany) S Graf (Czechoslovakia) J Novotná	4	2
3	(United States) K Adams (United States) Z Garrison	3	3
2	(United States) M Navratilova (United States) P Shriver	6	6

Final
1	(Czechoslovakia) H Suková (Commonwealth of Independent States) N Zvereva	7^{7}	6
2	(United States) M Navratilova (United States) P Shriver	6^{5}	4
