= 1992 Nutri-Metics Bendon Classic – Doubles =

Doubles
- 1992 Nutri-Metics Bendon Classic

Final
- Champions: (South Africa) Rosalyn Fairbank-Nideffer (Italy) Raffaella Reggi-Concato
- Runners-up: (Canada) Jill Hetherington (United States) Kathy Rinaldi
- Score: 1–6, 6–1, 7–5

Details
- Draw: 16
- Seeds: 4

Events
| Singles | Doubles |
- WTA Auckland Open

Patty Fendick and Larisa Savchenko-Neiland were the defending champions, but Fendick chose to compete at Tokyo during the same week (only in the singles tournament). Savchenko-Neiland teamed up with Andrea Strnadová and lost in the semifinals to Rosalyn Fairbank-Nideffer and Raffaella Reggi-Concato.

Fairbank-Nideffer and Reggi-Concato won the title by defeating Jill Hetherington and Kathy Rinaldi 1–6, 6–1, 7–5 in the final.

== Seeds ==
1. (United States) Jill Hetherington / (Canada) Kathy Rinaldi (final)
2. (Latvia) Larisa Savchenko-Neiland / (Czechoslovakia) Andrea Strnadová (semifinals)
3. (South Africa) Rosalyn Fairbank-Nideffer / (Italy) Raffaella Reggi-Concato (champions)
4. (Australia) Jo-Anne Faull / (New Zealand) Julie Richardson (first round)

== Draw ==
Key

- Q = Qualifier
- WC = Wild card
- LL = Lucky loser
- Alt = Alternate
- ITF = ITF entry
- PR = Protected ranking
- SR = Special ranking
- SE = Special exempt
- JE = Junior exempt
- JR = Junior Accelerator Programme entrant
- CO = College Accelerator Programme entrant
- NG = Next Gen Accelerator Program entrant
- w/o = Walkover
- r = Retired
- d = Defaulted

=== Draw ===
First round
1 | (Canada) J Hetherington (United States) K Rinaldi | 6 | 6
(France) A Dechaume (Argentina) B Fulco-Villella | 1 | 2
(Mexico) L Novelo (Australia) K Radford | 6 | 7
(Australia) K Sharpe (New Zealand) C Toleafoa | 2 | 5
4 | (Australia) JA Faull (New Zealand) J Richardson | 3 | 7^{7} | 4
(United States) A Grossman (Japan) N Miyagi | 6 | 6^{5} | 6
(Netherlands) I Driehuis (Australia) L Pleming | 3 | 4
(Australia) L Field (United Kingdom) C Wood | 6 | 6
(United States) P O'Reilly (United States) Terri O'Reilly | 7^{7} | 7
(Socialist Federal Republic of Yugoslavia) N Ercegović (Poland) M Mróz | 6^{5} | 5
(Israel) I Berger (Czechoslovakia) D Szabová | 3 | 3
3 | (South Africa) R Fairbank-Nideffer (Italy) R Reggi-Concato | 6 | 6
(United States) D Faber (United Kingdom) S Gomer | 3 | 2
(Australia) K Godridge (Australia) L Stacey | 6 | 6
(United Kingdom) B Borneo (Belgium) A Devries | 4 | 3
2 | (Latvia) L Savchenko-Neiland (Czechoslovakia) A Strnadová | 6 | 6

Quarterfinals
1 | (Canada) J Hetherington (United States) K Rinaldi | 6 | 6
(Mexico) L Novelo (Australia) K Radford | 2 | 2
(United States) A Grossman (Japan) N Miyagi | 2 | 6^{4}
(Australia) L Field (United Kingdom) C Wood | 6 | 7^{7}
(United States) P O'Reilly (United States) Terri O'Reilly | 3 | 1
3 | (South Africa) R Fairbank-Nideffer (Italy) R Reggi-Concato | 6 | 6
(Australia) K Godridge (Australia) L Stacey | 3 | 0
2 | (Latvia) L Savchenko-Neiland (Czechoslovakia) A Strnadová | 6 | 6

Semifinals
1 | (Canada) J Hetherington (United States) K Rinaldi | 6 | 5 | 7^{7}
(Australia) L Field (United Kingdom) C Wood | 4 | 7 | 6^{1}
3 | (South Africa) R Fairbank-Nideffer (Italy) R Reggi-Concato | 6^{1} | 6 | 6
2 | (Latvia) L Savchenko-Neiland (Czechoslovakia) A Strnadová | 7^{7} | 2 | 0

Final
1 | (Canada) J Hetherington (United States) K Rinaldi | 6 | 1 | 5
3 | (South Africa) R Fairbank-Nideffer (Italy) R Reggi-Concato | 1 | 6 | 7
