= 1992 Nutri-Metics Bendon Classic – Singles =

Singles
- 1992 Nutri-Metics Bendon Classic

Final
- Champion: (United States) Robin White
- Runner-up: (Czechoslovakia) Andrea Strnadová
- Score: 2–6, 6–4, 6–3

Details
- Draw: 32 (2WC/4Q)
- Seeds: 8

Events
Singles	Doubles
- WTA Auckland Open

Eva Švíglerová was the defending champion, but chose to compete at Tokyo during the same week, losing in the first round to Helena Suková.

Robin White won the title by defeating Andrea Strnadová 2–6, 6–4, 6–3 in the final.

== Seeds ==
1. (Czechoslovakia) Andrea Strnadová (final)
2. (Germany) Sabine Hack (first round)
3. (Latvia) Larisa Savchenko-Neiland (semifinals)
4. (Germany) Veronika Martinek (second round)
5. (France) Alexia Dechaume (quarterfinals)
6. (Italy) Raffaella Reggi-Concato (quarterfinals)
7. (United States) Susan Sloane-Lundy (second round)
8. (Argentina) Bettina Fulco-Villella (quarterfinals)

== Draw ==
Key

- Q = Qualifier
- WC = Wild card
- LL = Lucky loser
- Alt = Alternate
- ITF = ITF entry
- PR = Protected ranking
- SR = Special ranking
- SE = Special exempt
- JE = Junior exempt
- JR = Junior Accelerator Programme entrant
- CO = College Accelerator Programme entrant
- NG = Next Gen Accelerator Program entrant
- w/o = Walkover
- r = Retired
- d = Defaulted

=== Finals ===
Semifinals
1	(Czechoslovakia) Andrea Strnadová	6	3	6
3	(Latvia) Larisa Savchenko-Neiland	2	6	2
(United States) Robin White	6	6
(Finland) Petra Thorén	4	3

Final
1	(Czechoslovakia) Andrea Strnadová	6	4	3
(United States) Robin White	2	6	6

=== Top half ===
First round
1	(Czechoslovakia) A Strnadová	6	6
(Socialist Federal Republic of Yugoslavia) N Ercegović	3	3
Q	(Israel) A Smashnova	1	3
(United Kingdom) S Gomer	6	6
Q	(Finland) N Dahlman	6	6
(South Africa) R Fairbank-Nideffer	1	2
(Czechoslovakia) D Szabová	3	2
5	(France) A Dechaume	6	6
3	(Latvia) L Savchenko-Neiland	6	6
(Germany) I Cueto	4	3
(United States) K Adams	4	4
(Argentina) C Tessi	6	6
(Germany) K Oeljeklaus	3	4
(France) S Testud	6	6
Q	(Australia) N Pratt	4	4
8	(Argentina) B Fulco-Villella	6	6

Second round
1	(Czechoslovakia) A Strnadová	6	6
(United Kingdom) S Gomer	3	3
Q	(Finland) N Dahlman	3	3
5	(France) A Dechaume	6	6
3	(Latvia) L Savchenko-Neiland	6	7^{7}
(Argentina) C Tessi	3	6^{5}
(France) S Testud	3	6	4
8	(Argentina) B Fulco-Villella	6	3	6

Quarterfinals
1	(Czechoslovakia) A Strnadová	7^{7}	6^{6}	6
5	(France) A Dechaume	6^{3}	7^{8}	2
3	(Latvia) L Savchenko-Neiland	6	6
8	(Argentina) B Fulco-Villella	2	4

Semifinals
1	(Czechoslovakia) A Strnadová	6	3	6
3	(Latvia) L Savchenko-Neiland	2	6	2

=== Bottom half ===
First round
7	(United States) S Sloane-Lundy	6	6
(United Kingdom) C Wood	2	2
(United Kingdom) M Javer	6	7
WC	(New Zealand) C Toleafoa	4	5
(Australia) K Godridge	6	1	1
(United States) R White	4	6	6
(United States) K Rinaldi	6^{2}	6	4
4	(Germany) V Martinek	7^{7}	4	6
6	(Italy) R Reggi-Concato	6	6
(United States) A Grossman	2	4
(United States) D Faber	7^{7}	6
Q	(Mexico) A Gavaldón	6^{3}	0
WC	(New Zealand) J Richardson	2	7^{7}	1
(Finland) P Thorén	6	6^{3}	6
(Australia) J Byrne	7	7^{7}
2	(Germany) S Hack	5	6^{4}

Second round
7	(United States) S Sloane-Lundy	1	3
(United Kingdom) M Javer	6	6
(United States) R White	6	6
4	(Germany) V Martinek	2	1
6	(Italy) R Reggi-Concato	6	6
(United States) D Faber	4	4
(Finland) P Thorén	7	6
(Australia) J Byrne	5	1

Quarterfinals
(United Kingdom) M Javer	6	3	1
(United States) R White	3	6	6
6	(Italy) R Reggi-Concato	3	2
(Finland) P Thorén	6	6

Semifinals
(United States) R White	6	6
(Finland) P Thorén	4	3
