= 1992 Bank of the West Classic – Doubles =

Doubles
- 1992 Bank of the West Classic

Final
- Champions: (United States) Gigi Fernández (Commonwealth of Independent States) Natasha Zvereva
- Runners-up: (South Africa) Rosalyn Fairbank-Nideffer (United States) Gretchen Magers
- Score: 3–6, 6–2, 6–4

Details
- Draw: 16 (1WC)
- Seeds: 4

Events
Singles	Doubles
← 1991 ·	Silicon Valley Classic	· 1993 →

Patty Fendick and Gigi Fernández were the defending champions, but competed this year with different partners.

Fendick teamed up with Andrea Strnadová and lost in the first round to Lise Gregory and Marianne Werdel.

Fernández teamed up with Natasha Zvereva and successfully defended her title, by defeating Rosalyn Fairbank-Nideffer and Gretchen Magers 3–6, 6–2, 6–4 in the final.

== Seeds ==
1. (United States) Gigi Fernández / (Commonwealth of Independent States) Natasha Zvereva (champions)
2. (United States) Zina Garrison / (Latvia) Larisa Savchenko-Neiland (first round)
3. (United States) Martina Navratilova / (United States) Pam Shriver (first round)
4. (Canada) Jill Hetherington / (United States) Kathy Rinaldi (semifinals)

== Draw ==
=== Key ===
- Q = Qualifier
- WC = Wild card
- LL = Lucky loser
- Alt = Alternate
- SE = Special exempt
- PR = Protected ranking
- ITF = ITF entry
- JE = Junior exempt
- w/o = Walkover
- r = Retired
- d = Defaulted
- SR = Special ranking

=== Draw ===
First round
1	(United States) G Fernández (Commonwealth of Independent States) N Zvereva	7	6
(Australia) E Smylie (United States) R White	5	3
(Commonwealth of Independent States) N Medvedeva (Commonwealth of Independent States) L Meskhi	6	6
(United States) C Cunningham (United States) A Grossman	4	1
4	(Canada) J Hetherington (United States) K Rinaldi	3	6	6
(Australia) N Provis (South Africa) E Reinach	6	2	4
(United States) L Harvey Wild (Germany) A Huber	6	6
WC	(United States) A Frazier (United States) K Po	0	4
(United States) E Burgin (South Africa) M de Swardt	0	2
(Germany) C Kohde-Kilsch (United States) S Rehe	6	6
(South Africa) R Fairbank-Nideffer (United States) G Magers	4	6	6
3	(United States) M Navratilova (United States) P Shriver	6	3	3
(United States) P Fendick (Czechoslovakia) A Strnadová	7	2	4
(South Africa) L Gregory (United States) M Werdel	5	6	6
(United States) K Adams (United States) L McNeil	7^{7}	7
2	(United States) Z Garrison (Latvia) L Savchenko-Neiland	6^{2}	5

Quarterfinals
1	(United States) G Fernández (Commonwealth of Independent States) N Zvereva	w/o
(Commonwealth of Independent States) N Medvedeva (Commonwealth of Independent States) L Meskhi
4	(Canada) J Hetherington (United States) K Rinaldi	7^{7}	7
(United States) L Harvey Wild (Germany) A Huber	6^{5}	5
(Germany) C Kohde-Kilsch (United States) S Rehe	7^{9}	2	2
(South Africa) R Fairbank-Nideffer (United States) G Magers	6^{7}	6	6
(South Africa) L Gregory (United States) M Werdel	2	3
(United States) K Adams (United States) L McNeil	6	6

Semifinals
1	(United States) G Fernández (Commonwealth of Independent States) N Zvereva	6	6
4	(Canada) J Hetherington (United States) K Rinaldi	0	1
(South Africa) R Fairbank-Nideffer (United States) G Magers	3	7^{8}	6
(United States) K Adams (United States) L McNeil	6	6^{6}	2

Final
1	(United States) G Fernández (Commonwealth of Independent States) N Zvereva	3	6	6
(South Africa) R Fairbank-Nideffer (United States) G Magers	6	2	4
