= 1992 Bank of the West Classic – Singles =

Singles
- 1992 Bank of the West Classic

Final
- Champion: (Federal Republic of Yugoslavia) Monica Seles
- Runner-up: (United States) Martina Navratilova
- Score: 6–3, 6–4

Details
- Draw: 28 (2WC)
- Seeds: 8

Events
Singles	Doubles
← 1991 ·	Silicon Valley Classic	· 1993 →

Martina Navratilova was the defending champion, but lost in the final to Monica Seles. The score was 6–3, 6–4.

== Seeds ==
The top four seeds received a bye to the second round.

1. (Federal Republic of Yugoslavia) Monica Seles (champion)
2. (United States) Martina Navratilova (final)
3. (Germany) Anke Huber (semifinals)
4. (Bulgaria) Katerina Maleeva (semifinals)
5. (United States) Lori McNeil (second round)
6. (United States) Amy Frazier (first round)
7. (France) ~~Mary Pierce~~ (withdrew)
8. (United States) Zina Garrison (second round)

== Draw ==
=== Key ===
- Q = Qualifier
- WC = Wild card
- LL = Lucky loser
- Alt = Alternate
- SE = Special exempt
- PR = Protected ranking
- ITF = ITF entry
- JE = Junior exempt
- w/o = Walkover
- r = Retired
- d = Defaulted
- SR = Special ranking

=== Finals ===
Semifinals
1	(Federal Republic of Yugoslavia) Monica Seles	6	6
3	(Germany) Anke Huber	2	3
4	(Bulgaria) Katerina Maleeva	1	2
2	(United States) Martina Navratilova	6	6

Final
1	(Federal Republic of Yugoslavia) Monica Seles	6	6
2	(United States) Martina Navratilova	3	4

=== Top half ===
First round
(United States) S Rehe	6	1
(United States) G Fernández	2	0^{r}
WC	(Croatia) I Majoli	6	6^{5}	6
(Czechoslovakia) K Habšudová	2	7^{7}	1
(United States) K Po	3	3
5	(United States) L McNeil	6	6
(Latvia) L Savchenko-Neiland	7^{7}	3	6
(Canada) H Kelesi	6^{4}	6	2
(United States) P Shriver	6	6
(South Africa) R Fairbank-Nideffer	2	2
(Peru) L Gildemeister	4	6	6^{4}
8	(United States) Z Garrison	6	4	7^{7}

Second round
1	(Federal Republic of Yugoslavia) M Seles	6	6
(United States) S Rehe	4	1
WC	(Croatia) I Majoli	6	0	6
5	(United States) L McNeil	3	6	2
3	(Germany) A Huber	1	6	6
(Latvia) L Savchenko-Neiland	6	0	0
(United States) P Shriver	2	6	7
8	(United States) Z Garrison	6	4	5

Quarterfinals
1	(Federal Republic of Yugoslavia) M Seles	6	6
WC	(Croatia) I Majoli	3	1
3	(Germany) A Huber	6	6
(United States) P Shriver	2	4

Semifinals
1	(Federal Republic of Yugoslavia) M Seles	6	6
3	(Germany) A Huber	2	3

=== Bottom half ===
First round
6	(United States) A Frazier	4	6	3
(Netherlands) B Schultz	6	2	6
WC	(United States) B Nagelsen	7^{7}	1	1
(United States) P Fendick	6^{2}	6	6
(United States) R White	1	2
(United States) A Grossman	6	6
(Commonwealth of Independent States) L Meskhi	6	6
(United States) C Cunningham	4	4
(United States) L Harvey Wild	4	0
(Commonwealth of Independent States) N Zvereva	6	6
(United Kingdom) M Javer	1	5
(Australia) N Provis	6	7

Second round
(Netherlands) B Schultz	4	4
(United States) P Fendick	6	6
(United States) A Grossman	4	6	3
4	(Bulgaria) K Maleeva	6	4	6
(Commonwealth of Independent States) L Meskhi	6	6^{4}	6^{5}
(Commonwealth of Independent States) N Zvereva	4	7^{7}	7^{7}
(Australia) N Provis	1	6	1
2	(United States) M Navratilova	6	2	6

Quarterfinals
(United States) P Fendick	6	1	1
4	(Bulgaria) K Maleeva	4	6	6
(Commonwealth of Independent States) N Zvereva	2	2
2	(United States) M Navratilova	6	6

Semifinals
4	(Bulgaria) K Maleeva	1	2
2	(United States) M Navratilova	6	6
