= 1993 IGA Tennis Classic =

- Date: February 15–21
- Edition: 8th
- Category: Tier III
- Draw: 32S / 16D
- Prize money: $150,000
- Surface: Hard / indoor
- Location: Oklahoma City, OK, U.S.
- Venue: The Greens Country Club

Champions

Singles
- (United States) Zina Garrison-Jackson

Doubles
- (United States) Patty Fendick / (United States) Meredith McGrath
← 1992 ·	IGA Tennis Classic	· 1994 →

The 1993 IGA Tennis Classic was a women's tennis tournament played on indoor hard courts at The Greens Country Club in Oklahoma City in the United States that was part of Tier III of the 1993 WTA Tour. It was the eighth edition of the tournament was held from February 15 through February 21, 1993. Third-seeded Zina Garrison-Jackson won the singles title and earned $27,000 first-prize money.

== Finals ==
=== Singles ===
(United States) Zina Garrison-Jackson defeated (United States) Patty Fendick 6–2, 6–2

- It was Garrison-Jackson's 1st singles title of the year and the 12th of her career.

=== Doubles ===
(United States) Patty Fendick / (United States) Zina Garrison-Jackson defeated (United States) Katrina Adams / (Netherlands) Manon Bollegraf 6–3, 6–2
