= 1992 Virginia Slims of Oklahoma – Singles =

Singles
- 1992 Virginia Slims of Oklahoma

Final
- Champion: (United States) Zina Garrison
- Runner-up: (United States) Lori McNeil
- Score: 7–5, 3–6, 7–6^{(12–10)}

Details
- Draw: 32 (2WC/4Q)
- Seeds: 8

Events
Singles	Doubles
- U.S. National Indoor Championships

Jana Novotná was the defending champion, but did not compete this year.

Zina Garrison won the title by defeating Lori McNeil 7–5, 3–6, 7–6^{(12–10)} in the final.

== Seeds ==
1. (United States) Zina Garrison (champion)
2. (United States) Gigi Fernández (quarterfinals)
3. (United States) Lori McNeil (final)
4. (United States) Amy Frazier (semifinals)
5. (Australia) Nicole Provis (quarterfinals)
6. (United States) Debbie Graham (quarterfinals)
7. (Netherlands) Manon Bollegraf (semifinals)
8. (United States) Tami Whitlinger (second round)

== Draw ==
Key

- Q = Qualifier
- WC = Wild card
- LL = Lucky loser
- Alt = Alternate
- ITF = ITF entry
- PR = Protected ranking
- SR = Special ranking
- SE = Special exempt
- JE = Junior exempt
- JR = Junior Accelerator Programme entrant
- CO = College Accelerator Programme entrant
- NG = Next Gen Accelerator Program entrant
- w/o = Walkover
- r = Retired
- d = Defaulted

=== Finals ===
Semifinals
1	(United States) Zina Garrison	6	0	6
4	(United States) Amy Frazier	4	6	4
3	(United States) Lori McNeil	6	7
7	(Netherlands) Manon Bollegraf	3	5

Final
1	(United States) Zina Garrison	7	3	7^{12}
3	(United States) Lori McNeil	5	6	6^{10}

=== Top half ===
First round
1	(United States) Z Garrison	6	6
(United States) H Cioffi	4	1
(United States) K Adams	6^{5}	0
(Japan) R Hiraki	7^{7}	6
(United States) A Grossman	6	6
WC	(United States) S Sampras	1	3
(United States) H Ludloff	0	6	4
8	(United States) T Whitlinger	6	4	6
4	(United States) A Frazier	6	6
(United States) K Rinaldi	1	3
(Belgium) A Devries	5	2
Q	(United States) L Allen	7	6
(United States) P Harper	6	6
(United States) W Prausa	2	2
Q	(United States) B Bowes	6	5	6^{5}
6	(United States) D Graham	3	7	7^{7}

Second round
1	(United States) Z Garrison	6	6
(Japan) R Hiraki	2	1
(United States) A Grossman	7^{11}	7^{7}
8	(United States) T Whitlinger	6^{9}	6^{0}
4	(United States) A Frazier	6	6
Q	(United States) L Allen	4	0
(United States) P Harper	4	2
6	(United States) D Graham	6	6

Quarterfinals
1	(United States) Z Garrison	6	6
(United States) A Grossman	2	0
4	(United States) A Frazier	7^{7}	6
6	(United States) D Graham	6^{5}	2

Semifinals
1	(United States) Z Garrison	6	0	6
4	(United States) A Frazier	4	6	4

=== Bottom half ===
First round
5	(Australia) N Provis	6	6
Q	(Sweden) M Lindström	0	1
(Australia) K Godridge	6	5	7
(United States) A Keller	4	7	5
(South Africa) E Reinach	6	6
(United States) C Rubin	1	4
(United States) S Sloane-Lundy	3	2
3	(United States) L McNeil	6	6
7	(Netherlands) M Bollegraf	3	7	7
Q	(France) S Amiach	6	5	5
(United States) ML Daniels	2	6	3
(United States) E deLone	6	3	6
(United States) A Henricksson	2	1
(United States) R White	6	6
WC	(Mexico) A Gavaldón	1	4
2	(United States) G Fernández	6	6

Second round
5	(Australia) N Provis	6	6
(Australia) K Godridge	1	0
(South Africa) E Reinach	4	2
3	(United States) L McNeil	6	6
7	(Netherlands) M Bollegraf	3	7^{7}	6
(United States) E deLone	6	6^{2}	1
(United States) R White	6^{4}	1
2	(United States) G Fernández	7^{7}	6

Quarterfinals
5	(Australia) N Provis	6	4	6^{5}
3	(United States) L McNeil	4	6	7^{7}
7	(Netherlands) M Bollegraf	6	6
2	(United States) G Fernández	2	2

Semifinals
3	(United States) L McNeil	6	7
7	(Netherlands) M Bollegraf	3	5
