= 1992 BMW European Indoors – Singles =

Singles
- 1992 BMW European Indoors

Final
- Champion: (Germany) Steffi Graf
- Runner-up: (United States) Martina Navratilova
- Score: 2–6, 7–5, 7–5

Details
- Draw: 32 (2WC)
- Seeds: 8

Events
Singles	Doubles
← 1991 ·	Zurich Open	· 1993 →

Steffi Graf became the four-time champion by defeating Martina Navratilova 2–6, 7–5, 7–5 in the final.

== Seeds ==
1. (Germany) Steffi Graf (champion)
2. (United States) Martina Navratilova (final)
3. (Switzerland) Manuela Maleeva-Fragnière (second round)
4. (Czechoslovakia) Jana Novotná (semifinals)
5. (Czechoslovakia) Helena Suková (second round)
6. (United States) Zina Garrison (quarterfinals)
7. (Bulgaria) Magdalena Maleeva (quarterfinals)
8. (Austria) Judith Wiesner (quarterfinals)

== Draw ==
=== Key ===
- Q = Qualifier
- WC = Wild card
- LL = Lucky loser
- Alt = Alternate
- ITF = ITF entry
- PR = Protected ranking
- SR = Special ranking
- SE = Special exempt
- JE = Junior exempt
- JR = Junior Accelerator Programme entrant
- CO = College Accelerator Programme entrant
- NG = Next Gen Accelerator Program entrant
- w/o = Walkover
- r = Retired
- d = Defaulted

=== Finals ===
Semifinals
1	(Germany) Steffi Graf	6	4	7^{7}
4	(Czechoslovakia) Jana Novotná	2	6	6^{2}
(United States) Patty Fendick	3	1^{r}
2	(United States) Martina Navratilova	6	4

Final
1	(Germany) Steffi Graf	2	7	7
2	(United States) Martina Navratilova	6	5	5

=== Top half ===
First round
1	(Germany) S Graf	7	6
(Czechoslovakia) K Habšudová	5	1
WC	(Switzerland) N Tschan	2	3
(Germany) W Probst	6	6
(United States) P Shriver	6	6
(Italy) L Golarsa	3	1
(Peru) L Gildemeister	5	4
8	(Austria) J Wiesner	7	6
4	(Czechoslovakia) J Novotná	6	6
(United States) L Harvey Wild	4	3
(Commonwealth of Independent States) N Zvereva	6	6
(Socialist Federal Republic of Yugoslavia) N Ercegović	4	1
(Czechoslovakia) A Strnadová	4	6	6
(United States) L Allen	6	3	4
(Canada) P Hy	3	3
5	(Czechoslovakia) H Suková	6	6

Second round
1	(Germany) S Graf	6	6
(Germany) W Probst	0	2
(United States) P Shriver	4	6	4
8	(Austria) J Wiesner	6	4	6
4	(Czechoslovakia) J Novotná	7	6
(Commonwealth of Independent States) N Zvereva	5	2
(Czechoslovakia) A Strnadová	7^{7}	3	6
5	(Czechoslovakia) H Suková	6^{4}	6	3

Quarterfinals
1	(Germany) S Graf	7	6
8	(Austria) J Wiesner	5	4
4	(Czechoslovakia) J Novotná	6	6
(Czechoslovakia) A Strnadová	4	0

Semifinals
1	(Germany) S Graf	6	4	7^{7}
4	(Czechoslovakia) J Novotná	2	6	6^{2}

=== Bottom half ===
First round
6	(United States) Z Garrison	6	6^{7}	6
(Italy) N Baudone	3	7^{9}	3
(United Kingdom) J Durie	6	4	6
(United States) K Adams	2	6	4
(Czechoslovakia) K Kroupová	0	3
(United States) P Fendick	6	6
(Germany) M Kochta	1	6	5
3	(Switzerland) M Maleeva-Fragnière	6	3	7
7	(Bulgaria) M Maleeva	6	6
(Netherlands) B Schultz	3	3
WC	(Hungary) A Temesvári-Trunkos	4	7	7^{7}
(Germany) C Kohde-Kilsch	6	5	6^{5}
(Germany) B Rittner	5	6	6
(United States) S Rehe	7	1	4
(Switzerland) E Zardo	0	0
2	(United States) M Navratilova	6	6

Second round
6	(United States) Z Garrison	3	6	6
(United Kingdom) J Durie	6	3	4
(United States) P Fendick	6	6
3	(Switzerland) M Maleeva-Fragnière	3	3
7	(Bulgaria) M Maleeva	6	6
WC	(Hungary) A Temesvári-Trunkos	2	2
(Germany) B Rittner	3	0
2	(United States) M Navratilova	6	6

Quarterfinals
6	(United States) Z Garrison	0	2
(United States) P Fendick	6	6
7	(Bulgaria) M Maleeva	2	3
2	(United States) M Navratilova	6	6

Semifinals
(United States) P Fendick	3	1^{r}
2	(United States) M Navratilova	6	4
