= Nike Dobrovits =

- Country (sports): Austria
- Born: 2 December 1973 (age 51)
- Prize money: US$ 25,456

Singles
- Career titles: 1 ITF
- Highest ranking: No. 218 (11 May 1992)

Doubles
- Highest ranking: No. 215 (22 Mar 1993)

Nike Dobrovits (born 2 December 1973) is an Austrian former professional tennis player.

Active on tour in the late 1980s early 1990s, Dobrovits reached a career best singles ranking of 218. She made two WTA Tour singles main draw appearances at the Austrian Open, as a qualifier in 1990 and wildcard entrant in 1992. Her biggest title was a $25,000 ITF tournament in Jakarta, which she won in 1992 over Hiromi Nagano in the final.

Dobrovits now works as an ophthalmologist in Vienna.

== ITF finals ==
=== Singles: 2 (1–1) ===
Outcome	No.	Date	Tournament	Surface	Opponent	Score
Runner-up	1.	May 1991	Katowice, Poland	Clay	(Czechoslovakia) Radka Bobková	4–6, 6–4, 3–6
Winner	2.	May 1992	Jakarta, Indonesia	Clay	(Japan) Hiromi Nagano	6–2, 6–4
