= 1991 Jello Tennis Classic =

- Date: November 11–16
- Edition: 12th
- Category: Tier IV
- Draw: 32S / 16D
- Prize money: $150,000
- Surface: Hard / intdoor
- Location: Indianapolis, Indiana, U.S.
- Venue: Indianapolis Racquet Club

Champions

Singles
- (Bulgaria) Katerina Maleeva

Doubles
- (United States) Patty Fendick / (United States) Gigi Fernández
- Virginia Slims of Indianapolis

The 1991 Jello Tennis Classic was a women's tennis tournament played on indoor hard courts at the Indianapolis Racquet Club in Indianapolis, Indiana in the United States and was part of the Tier IV category of the 1991 WTA Tour. It was the 12th edition of the tournament and ran from November 11 through November 16, 1991. First-seeded Katerina Maleeva won the singles title and earned $27,000 first-prize money.

== Finals ==
=== Singles ===
(Bulgaria) Katerina Maleeva defeated (United States) Audra Keller 7–6^{(7–1)}, 6–2

- It was Maleeva' 1st singles title of the year and the 10th of her career.

=== Doubles ===
(United States) Patty Fendick / (United States) Gigi Fernández defeated (United States) Katrina Adams / (Argentina) Mercedes Paz 6–4, 6–2
