= 1990 WTA Tour =

Women's tennis circuit

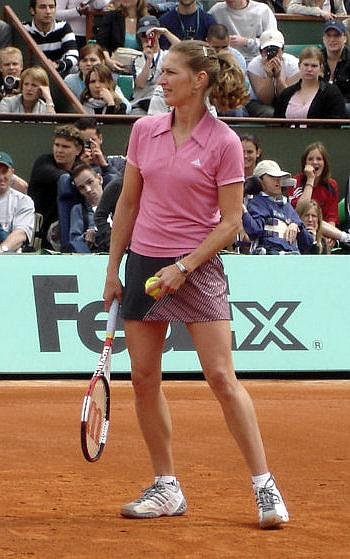
- Steffi Graf finished the year as world No. 1 for the fourth time in her career. She won ten tournaments during the season, including a major at the Australian Open. She also won a Tier I event and finished runner-up at two other majors, the French Open and the US Open.

Details
- Duration: December 11, 1989 – November 18, 1990
- Edition: 18th
- Tournaments: 59
- Categories: Grand Slam (4); WTA Championships; Tier I (6); Tier II (14); Tier III (7); Tier IV (15); Tier V (12)

Achievements (singles)
- Most titles: (Germany) Steffi Graf (10)
- Most finals: (Germany) Steffi Graf (13)
- Prize money leader: (Germany) Steffi Graf $1,921,853
- Points leader: (Germany) Steffi Graf 278.10

Awards
- Player of the year: (West Germany) Steffi Graf
- Doubles team of the year: (Czechoslovakia) Helena Suková (Czechoslovakia) Jana Novotná
- Most improved player of the year: (Socialist Federal Republic of Yugoslavia) Monica Seles
- Newcomer of the year: (United States) Jennifer Capriati
- Comeback player of the year: (Australia) Elizabeth Smylie

The 1990 WTA Tour (officially titled 1990 Kraft General Foods World Tour after its sponsor) was the elite professional tennis circuit organized by the Women's Tennis Association (WTA) for the 1990 tennis season. The 1990 WTA Tour calendar comprised the four Grand Slam tournaments, the WTA Tour Championships and the WTA Tier I, Tier II, Tier III, Tier IV and Tier V events. ITF tournaments were not part of the WTA Tour, although they award points for the WTA World Ranking.

== Schedule ==
The complete schedule of events on the 1990 calendar, with player progression documented from the quarterfinals stage.

Key

Grand Slam tournaments
Year-end championships
Tier I events
Tier II events
Tier III events
Tier IV and V events
Team events

=== December 1989 ===
Week	Tournament	Champions	Runners-up	Semifinalists	Quarterfinalists
Dec 11	Rainha Classic; Guarujá, Brazil; Tier V Hard – $75,000 – 32S/16D	(Argentina) Federica Haumüller; 7–6^{(9–7)}, 6–4	(Argentina) Patricia Tarabini	(Netherlands) Noëlle van Lottum (Poland) Renata Baranski	(Argentina) Cristina Tessi (Canada) Maureen Drake (Netherlands) Hellas ter Riet (Argentina) Andrea Tiezzi
Dec 11	Rainha Classic; Guarujá, Brazil; Tier V Hard – $75,000 – 32S/16D	(Argentina) Mercedes Paz (Argentina) Patricia Tarabini; 6–2, 6–2	(Brazil) Cláudia Chabalgoity (Brazil) Luciana Corsato	(Netherlands) Noëlle van Lottum (Poland) Renata Baranski	(Argentina) Cristina Tessi (Canada) Maureen Drake (Netherlands) Hellas ter Riet (Argentina) Andrea Tiezzi

=== January ===
Week	Tournament	Champions	Runners-up	Semifinalists	Quarterfinalists
Jan 1	Hyundai Hopman Cup; Perth, Australia; ITF Mixed Teams Championships; Hard (i) – A$1,000,000 – 12 teams	Spain; 2–1	United States	Australia; Czech Republic	Italy; Soviet Union; France; Austria
Jan 1	Danone Hardcourt Championships; Brisbane, Australia; Tier IV; Hard – $150,000 – 64S/32D; Singles – Doubles	(Soviet Union) Natasha Zvereva; 6–4, 6–0	(Australia) Rachel McQuillan	(Netherlands) Brenda Schultz (Austria) Judith Wiesner	(Czechoslovakia) Helena Suková (Australia) Kristin Godridge (Japan) Kimiko Date (Czechoslovakia) Jana Novotná
Jan 1	Danone Hardcourt Championships; Brisbane, Australia; Tier IV; Hard – $150,000 – 64S/32D; Singles – Doubles	(Czechoslovakia) Jana Novotná (Czechoslovakia) Helena Suková; 6–3, 6–1	(Australia) Hana Mandlíková (United States) Pam Shriver	(Netherlands) Brenda Schultz (Austria) Judith Wiesner	(Czechoslovakia) Helena Suková (Australia) Kristin Godridge (Japan) Kimiko Date (Czechoslovakia) Jana Novotná
Jan 8	Holden NSW Open; Sydney, Australia; Tier III; Hard – $225,000 – 56S/28D; Singles – Doubles	(Soviet Union) Natasha Zvereva; 6–3, 4–6, 6–3	(Austria) Barbara Paulus	(Austria) Judith Wiesner (United States) Amy Frazier	(Czechoslovakia) Radka Zrubáková (West Germany) Claudia Porwik (France) Julie Halard (Italy) Raffaella Reggi
Jan 8	Holden NSW Open; Sydney, Australia; Tier III; Hard – $225,000 – 56S/28D; Singles – Doubles	(Czechoslovakia) Jana Novotná (Czechoslovakia) Helena Suková; 6–3, 7–5	(Soviet Union) Larisa Neiland (Soviet Union) Natasha Zvereva	(Austria) Judith Wiesner (United States) Amy Frazier	(Czechoslovakia) Radka Zrubáková (West Germany) Claudia Porwik (France) Julie Halard (Italy) Raffaella Reggi
Jan 15; Jan 22	Australian Open; Melbourne, Australia; Grand Slam; Hard – $1,000,000– 128S/64D/32X; Singles – Doubles – Mixed doubles	(West Germany) Steffi Graf; 6–3, 6–4	(United States) Mary Joe Fernández	(Czechoslovakia) Helena Suková (West Germany) Claudia Porwik	(United States) Patty Fendick (Bulgaria) Katerina Maleeva (United States) Zina Garrison-Jackson (Mexico) Angélica Gavaldón
Jan 15; Jan 22	Australian Open; Melbourne, Australia; Grand Slam; Hard – $1,000,000– 128S/64D/32X; Singles – Doubles – Mixed doubles	(Czechoslovakia) Jana Novotná (Czechoslovakia) Helena Suková; 7–6^{(7–5)}, 7–6^{(8–6)}	(United States) Patty Fendick (United States) Mary Joe Fernández	(Czechoslovakia) Helena Suková (West Germany) Claudia Porwik	(United States) Patty Fendick (Bulgaria) Katerina Maleeva (United States) Zina Garrison-Jackson (Mexico) Angélica Gavaldón
Jan 15; Jan 22	Australian Open; Melbourne, Australia; Grand Slam; Hard – $1,000,000– 128S/64D/32X; Singles – Doubles – Mixed doubles	(Soviet Union) Natasha Zvereva (United States) Jim Pugh; 4–6, 6–2, 6–3	(United States) Zina Garrison-Jackson (United States) Rick Leach	(Czechoslovakia) Helena Suková (West Germany) Claudia Porwik	(United States) Patty Fendick (Bulgaria) Katerina Maleeva (United States) Zina Garrison-Jackson (Mexico) Angélica Gavaldón
Jan 29	Nutri-Metics International; Auckland, New Zealand; Tier V Hard – $75,000 – 32S/16D; Singles – Doubles	(Soviet Union) Leila Meskhi; 6–1, 6–0	(Belgium) Sabine Appelmans	(New Zealand) Belinda Cordwell (United States) Robin White	(United States) Beverly Bowes (United States) Andrea Leand (United Kingdom) Jo Durie (Belgium) Sandra Wasserman
Jan 29	Nutri-Metics International; Auckland, New Zealand; Tier V Hard – $75,000 – 32S/16D; Singles – Doubles	(Soviet Union) Natalia Medvedeva (Soviet Union) Leila Meskhi; 3–6, 6–3, 7–6^{(7–3)}	(Canada) Jill Hetherington (United States) Robin White	(New Zealand) Belinda Cordwell (United States) Robin White	(United States) Beverly Bowes (United States) Andrea Leand (United Kingdom) Jo Durie (Belgium) Sandra Wasserman
Jan 29	Pan Pacific Open; Tokyo, Japan; Tier II; Carpet (i) – $350,000 – 28S/16D; Singles – Doubles	(West Germany) Steffi Graf; 6–1, 6–2	(Spain) Arantxa Sánchez Vicario	(Switzerland) Manuela Maleeva-Fragniere (Japan) Akiko Kijimuta	(Soviet Union) Larisa Savchenko-Neiland (Netherlands) Brenda Schultz (Japan) Nana Miyagi (United States) Gigi Fernández
Jan 29	Pan Pacific Open; Tokyo, Japan; Tier II; Carpet (i) – $350,000 – 28S/16D; Singles – Doubles	(United States) Gigi Fernández (Australia) Elizabeth Smylie; 6–2, 6–2	(Australia) Jo-Anne Faull (Australia) Rachel McQuillan	(Switzerland) Manuela Maleeva-Fragniere (Japan) Akiko Kijimuta	(Soviet Union) Larisa Savchenko-Neiland (Netherlands) Brenda Schultz (Japan) Nana Miyagi (United States) Gigi Fernández

=== February ===
Week	Tournament	Champions	Runners-up	Semifinalists	Quarterfinalists
Feb 5	Fernleaf Classic; Wellington, New Zealand; Tier V Hard – $75,000 – 32S/16D; Singles – Doubles	(West Germany) Wiltrud Probst; 1–6, 6–4, 6–0	(Soviet Union) Leila Meskhi	(Belgium) Sabine Appelmans (New Zealand) Claudine Toleafoa	(Switzerland) Emanuela Zardo (Bulgaria) Magdalena Maleeva (Belgium) Sandra Wasserman (Austria) Beate Reinstadler
Feb 5	Fernleaf Classic; Wellington, New Zealand; Tier V Hard – $75,000 – 32S/16D; Singles – Doubles	(Soviet Union) Natalia Medvedeva (Soviet Union) Leila Meskhi; 6–3, 2–6, 6–4	(Australia) Michelle Jaggard-Lai (New Zealand) Julie Richardson	(Belgium) Sabine Appelmans (New Zealand) Claudine Toleafoa	(Switzerland) Emanuela Zardo (Bulgaria) Magdalena Maleeva (Belgium) Sandra Wasserman (Austria) Beate Reinstadler
Feb 5	Breyers Tennis Classic; Wichita, United States; Tier IV; Hard – $150,000 – 32S/16D; Singles – Doubles	(South Africa) Dianne Van Rensburg; 2–6, 7–5, 6–2	(France) Nathalie Tauziat	(United States) Mareen Louie Harper (United States) Susan Sloane	(Netherlands) Manon Bollegraf (Australia) Anne Minter (United States) Mary-Lou Daniels (United States) Amy Frazier
Feb 5	Breyers Tennis Classic; Wichita, United States; Tier IV; Hard – $150,000 – 32S/16D; Singles – Doubles	(Netherlands) Manon Bollegraf (United States) Meredith McGrath; 6–0, 6–2	(United States) Mary-Lou Daniels (United States) Wendy White	(United States) Mareen Louie Harper (United States) Susan Sloane	(Netherlands) Manon Bollegraf (Australia) Anne Minter (United States) Mary-Lou Daniels (United States) Amy Frazier
Feb 12	Virginia Slims of Chicago; Chicago, United States; Tier I Carpet (i) – $500,000 – 32S/16D; Singles – Doubles	(United States) Martina Navratilova; 6–3, 6–2	(Switzerland) Manuela Maleeva-Fragniere	(United States) Pam Shriver (United States) Zina Garrison-Jackson	(United States) Linda Harvey-Wild (United States) Tami Whitlinger (South Africa) Rosalyn Fairbank-Nideffer (France) Nathalie Tauziat
Feb 12	Virginia Slims of Chicago; Chicago, United States; Tier I Carpet (i) – $500,000 – 32S/16D; Singles – Doubles	(United States) Martina Navratilova (United States) Anne Smith; 6–7^{(9–11)}, 6–4, 6–3	(Spain) Arantxa Sánchez Vicario (France) Nathalie Tauziat	(United States) Pam Shriver (United States) Zina Garrison-Jackson	(United States) Linda Harvey-Wild (United States) Tami Whitlinger (South Africa) Rosalyn Fairbank-Nideffer (France) Nathalie Tauziat
Feb 19	Virginia Slims of Washington; Washington, United States; Tier II; Carpet (i) – $350,000 – 28S/16D; Singles – Doubles	(United States) Martina Navratilova; 6–1, 6–0	(United States) Zina Garrison-Jackson	(Socialist Federal Republic of Yugoslavia) Monica Seles (Soviet Union) Natalia Zvereva	(United States) Anne Smith (United States) Pam Shriver (Australia) Nicole Provis (France) Nathalie Tauziat
Feb 19	Virginia Slims of Washington; Washington, United States; Tier II; Carpet (i) – $350,000 – 28S/16D; Singles – Doubles	(United States) Martina Navratilova (United States) Zina Garrison-Jackson; 6–0, 6–3	(United States) Ann Henricksson (South Africa) Dianne Van Rensburg	(Socialist Federal Republic of Yugoslavia) Monica Seles (Soviet Union) Natalia Zvereva	(United States) Anne Smith (United States) Pam Shriver (Australia) Nicole Provis (France) Nathalie Tauziat
Feb 19	Virginia Slims of Oklahoma; Oklahoma City, United States; Tier IV; Hard (i) – $150,000 – 32S/16D; Singles – Doubles	(United States) Amy Frazier; 6–4, 6–2	(Netherlands) Manon Bollegraf	(Switzerland) Manuela Maleeva-Fragniere (Mexico) Angélica Gavaldón	(Japan) Etsuko Inoue (Australia) Anne Minter (United States) Jennifer Santrock (Netherlands) Brenda Schultz
Feb 19	Virginia Slims of Oklahoma; Oklahoma City, United States; Tier IV; Hard (i) – $150,000 – 32S/16D; Singles – Doubles	(United States) Mary-Lou Daniels (United States) Wendy White; 7–5, 6–2	(Netherlands) Manon Bollegraf (South Africa) Lise Gregory	(Switzerland) Manuela Maleeva-Fragniere (Mexico) Angélica Gavaldón	(Japan) Etsuko Inoue (Australia) Anne Minter (United States) Jennifer Santrock (Netherlands) Brenda Schultz
Feb 26	Virginia Slims of Indian Wells; Indian Wells, United States; Tier II; Hard – $350,000 – 56S/28D; Singles – Doubles	(United States) Martina Navratilova; 6–2, 5–7, 6–1	(Czechoslovakia) Helena Suková	(Bulgaria) Katerina Maleeva (United States) Amy Frazier	(France) Nathalie Herreman (United States) Meredith McGrath (France) Isabelle Demongeot (South Africa) Rosalyn Fairbank-Nideffer
Feb 26	Virginia Slims of Indian Wells; Indian Wells, United States; Tier II; Hard – $350,000 – 56S/28D; Singles – Doubles	(Czechoslovakia) Jana Novotná (Czechoslovakia) Helena Suková; 6–2, 7–6^{(8–6)}	(United States) Gigi Fernández (United States) Martina Navratilova	(Bulgaria) Katerina Maleeva (United States) Amy Frazier	(France) Nathalie Herreman (United States) Meredith McGrath (France) Isabelle Demongeot (South Africa) Rosalyn Fairbank-Nideffer

=== March ===
Week	Tournament	Champions	Runners-up	Semifinalists	Quarterfinalists
Mar 5	Virginia Slims of Florida; Boca Raton, United States; Tier II; Hard – $350,000 – 56S/28D; Singles – Doubles	(Argentina) Gabriela Sabatini; 6–4, 7–5	(United States) Jennifer Capriati	(United States) Mary Joe Fernández (Peru) Laura Gildemeister	(South Africa) Dianne Van Rensburg (South Africa) Amanda Coetzer (Czechoslovakia) Helena Suková (Czechoslovakia) Jana Novotná
Mar 5	Virginia Slims of Florida; Boca Raton, United States; Tier II; Hard – $350,000 – 56S/28D; Singles – Doubles	(Czechoslovakia) Jana Novotná (Czechoslovakia) Helena Suková; 6–4, 6–2	(United States) Elise Burgin (Australia) Wendy Turnbull	(United States) Mary Joe Fernández (Peru) Laura Gildemeister	(South Africa) Dianne Van Rensburg (South Africa) Amanda Coetzer (Czechoslovakia) Helena Suková (Czechoslovakia) Jana Novotná
Mar 12; Mar 19	Lipton International Players Championships; Key Biscayne, United States; Tier I Hard – $750,000 – 96S/64Q/48D; Singles – Doubles	(Socialist Federal Republic of Yugoslavia) Monica Seles; 6–1, 6–2	(Austria) Judith Wiesner	(Spain) Conchita Martínez (France) Nathalie Tauziat	(Argentina) Gabriela Sabatini (Switzerland) Manuela Maleeva-Fragniere (France) Nathalie Herreman (West Germany) Claudia Porwik
Mar 12; Mar 19	Lipton International Players Championships; Key Biscayne, United States; Tier I Hard – $750,000 – 96S/64Q/48D; Singles – Doubles	(Czechoslovakia) Jana Novotná (Czechoslovakia) Helena Suková; 6–4, 6–3	(United States) Betsy Nagelsen (United States) Robin White	(Spain) Conchita Martínez (France) Nathalie Tauziat	(Argentina) Gabriela Sabatini (Switzerland) Manuela Maleeva-Fragniere (France) Nathalie Herreman (West Germany) Claudia Porwik
Mar 25	U.S. Women's Hardcourt Championships; San Antonio, United States; Tier III; Hard – $225,000 – 16S/16Q/8D; Singles – Doubles	(Socialist Federal Republic of Yugoslavia) Monica Seles; 6–4, 6–3	(Switzerland) Manuela Maleeva-Fragniere	(United States) Lori McNeil (South Africa) Rosalyn Fairbank-Nideffer	(United States) Gigi Fernández (United States) Carrie Cunningham (Czechoslovakia) Jana Novotná (Australia) Hana Mandlíková
Mar 25	U.S. Women's Hardcourt Championships; San Antonio, United States; Tier III; Hard – $225,000 – 16S/16Q/8D; Singles – Doubles	(United States) Kathy Jordan (Australia) Elizabeth Smylie; 7–5, 7–5	(United States) Gigi Fernández (United States) Robin White	(United States) Lori McNeil (South Africa) Rosalyn Fairbank-Nideffer	(United States) Gigi Fernández (United States) Carrie Cunningham (Czechoslovakia) Jana Novotná (Australia) Hana Mandlíková
Mar 25	Virginia Slims of Houston; Houston, United States; Tier III; Clay – $225,000 – 16S/16Q/8D; Singles – Doubles	(Bulgaria) Katerina Maleeva; 6–1, 1–6, 6–4	(Spain) Arantxa Sánchez Vicario	(United States) Martina Navratilova (United States) Zina Garrison-Jackson	(Hungary) Andrea Temesvári (Peru) Laura Gildemeister (United States) Mary-Lou Daniels (Italy) Sandra Cecchini
Mar 25	Virginia Slims of Houston; Houston, United States; Tier III; Clay – $225,000 – 16S/16Q/8D; Singles – Doubles	Not completed		(United States) Martina Navratilova (United States) Zina Garrison-Jackson	(Hungary) Andrea Temesvári (Peru) Laura Gildemeister (United States) Mary-Lou Daniels (Italy) Sandra Cecchini

=== April ===
Week	Tournament	Champions	Runners-up	Semifinalists	Quarterfinalists
Apr 2	Family Circle Cup; Hilton Head Island, United States; Tier I Clay – $500,000 – 56S/28D; Singles – Doubles	(United States) Martina Navratilova; 6–2, 6–4	(United States) Jennifer Capriati	(Czechoslovakia) Regina Rajchrtová (Soviet Union) Natasha Zvereva	(Bulgaria) Katerina Maleeva (United States) Zina Garrison-Jackson (Spain) Conchita Martínez (Canada) Helen Kelesi
Apr 2	Family Circle Cup; Hilton Head Island, United States; Tier I Clay – $500,000 – 56S/28D; Singles – Doubles	(United States) Martina Navratilova (Spain) Arantxa Sánchez Vicario; 6–2, 6–1	(Argentina) Mercedes Paz (Soviet Union) Natasha Zvereva	(Czechoslovakia) Regina Rajchrtová (Soviet Union) Natasha Zvereva	(Bulgaria) Katerina Maleeva (United States) Zina Garrison-Jackson (Spain) Conchita Martínez (Canada) Helen Kelesi
Apr 9	Bausch & Lomb Championships; Amelia Island, United States; Tier II; Clay – $350,000 – 56S/28D	(West Germany) Steffi Graf; 6–1, 6–0	(Spain) Arantxa Sánchez Vicario	(Soviet Union) Natasha Zvereva (Argentina) Gabriela Sabatini	(Canada) Carling Bassett-Seguso (United States) Zina Garrison-Jackson (Canada) Helen Kelesi (West Germany) Isabel Cueto
Apr 9	Bausch & Lomb Championships; Amelia Island, United States; Tier II; Clay – $350,000 – 56S/28D	(Argentina) Mercedes Paz (Spain) Arantxa Sánchez Vicario; 7–6^{(7–5)}, 6–4	(Czechoslovakia) Regina Kordová (Hungary) Andrea Temesvári	(Soviet Union) Natasha Zvereva (Argentina) Gabriela Sabatini	(Canada) Carling Bassett-Seguso (United States) Zina Garrison-Jackson (Canada) Helen Kelesi (West Germany) Isabel Cueto
Apr 9	Suntory Japan Open Tennis Championships; Tokyo, Japan; Tier IV; Hard – $150,000 – 32S/16D; Singles – Doubles	(Sweden) Catarina Lindqvist; 6–3, 6–2	(Australia) Elizabeth Smylie	(Czechoslovakia) Eva Švíglerová (Japan) Naoko Sawamatsu	(New Zealand) Belinda Cordwell (United Kingdom) Monique Javer (Japan) Kumiko Okamoto (Japan) Kimiko Date
Apr 9	Suntory Japan Open Tennis Championships; Tokyo, Japan; Tier IV; Hard – $150,000 – 32S/16D; Singles – Doubles	(United States) Kathy Jordan (Australia) Elizabeth Smylie; 6–0, 3–6, 6–1	(United States) Hu Na (Australia) Michelle Jaggard	(Czechoslovakia) Eva Švíglerová (Japan) Naoko Sawamatsu	(New Zealand) Belinda Cordwell (United Kingdom) Monique Javer (Japan) Kumiko Okamoto (Japan) Kimiko Date
Apr 16	Eckerd Tennis Open; Tampa, United States; Tier III; Clay – $225,000 – 32S/16D	(Socialist Federal Republic of Yugoslavia) Monica Seles; 6–1, 6–0	(Bulgaria) Katerina Maleeva	(Spain) Conchita Martínez (Spain) Arantxa Sánchez Vicario	(United States) Susan Sloane (United States) Cammy MacGregor (Italy) Sandra Cecchini (Canada) Helen Kelesi
Apr 16	Eckerd Tennis Open; Tampa, United States; Tier III; Clay – $225,000 – 32S/16D	(Argentina) Mercedes Paz (Spain) Arantxa Sánchez Vicario; 6–2, 6–0	(Italy) Sandra Cecchini (Peru) Laura Gildemeister	(Spain) Conchita Martínez (Spain) Arantxa Sánchez Vicario	(United States) Susan Sloane (United States) Cammy MacGregor (Italy) Sandra Cecchini (Canada) Helen Kelesi
Apr 23	DHL Singapore Open; Kallang, Singapore; Tier IV; Hard – $150,000 – 56S/28D; Singles – Doubles	(Japan) Naoko Sawamatsu; 7–6^{(7–5)}, 3–6, 6–4	(United Kingdom) Sarah Loosemore	(Japan) Maya Kidowaki (Belgium) Sabine Appelmans	(Peru) Pilar Vásquez (Japan) Tamaka Takagi (Hong Kong) Patricia Hy (United States) Marianne Werdel
Apr 23	DHL Singapore Open; Kallang, Singapore; Tier IV; Hard – $150,000 – 56S/28D; Singles – Doubles	(United Kingdom) Jo Durie (Canada) Jill Hetherington; 6–4, 6–1	(France) Pascale Paradis (France) Catherine Suire	(Japan) Maya Kidowaki (Belgium) Sabine Appelmans	(Peru) Pilar Vásquez (Japan) Tamaka Takagi (Hong Kong) Patricia Hy (United States) Marianne Werdel
Apr 23	International Championships of Spain; Barcelona, Spain; Tier IV; Clay – $150,000 – 28S/16D	(Spain) Arantxa Sánchez Vicario; 6–4, 6–2	(West Germany) Isabel Cueto	(Austria) Judith Wiesner (United States) Mary Joe Fernández	(France) Isabelle Demongeot (Australia) Rachel McQuillan (France) Julie Halard (Italy) Laura Golarsa
Apr 23	International Championships of Spain; Barcelona, Spain; Tier IV; Clay – $150,000 – 28S/16D	(Argentina) Mercedes Paz (Spain) Arantxa Sánchez Vicario; 6–7^{(7–9)}, 6–2, 6–1	(Socialist Federal Republic of Yugoslavia) Sabrina Goleš (Argentina) Patricia Tarabini	(Austria) Judith Wiesner (United States) Mary Joe Fernández	(France) Isabelle Demongeot (Australia) Rachel McQuillan (France) Julie Halard (Italy) Laura Golarsa
Apr 30	Citizen Cup; Hamburg, West Germany; Tier II; Clay – $350,000 – 64S/32D; Singles – Doubles	(West Germany) Steffi Graf; 5–7, 6–0, 6–1	(Spain) Arantxa Sánchez Vicario	(Austria) Judith Wiesner (United States) Martina Navratilova	(Czechoslovakia) Helena Suková (Czechoslovakia) Petra Langrová (Netherlands) Nicole Muns-Jagerman (Soviet Union) Leila Meskhi
Apr 30	Citizen Cup; Hamburg, West Germany; Tier II; Clay – $350,000 – 64S/32D; Singles – Doubles	(United States) Gigi Fernández (United States) Martina Navratilova; 6–2, 6–3	(Soviet Union) Larisa Savchenko-Neiland (Czechoslovakia) Helena Suková	(Austria) Judith Wiesner (United States) Martina Navratilova	(Czechoslovakia) Helena Suková (Czechoslovakia) Petra Langrová (Netherlands) Nicole Muns-Jagerman (Soviet Union) Leila Meskhi
Apr 30	Ilva Trophy; Taranto, Italy; Tier V Clay – $75,000 – 32S/16D; Singles – Doubles	(Italy) Raffaella Reggi; 5–7, 6–0, 6–1	(France) Alexia Dechaume	(France) Pascale Etchemendy (Austria) Petra Ritter	(Denmark) Tine Scheuer-Larsen (United States) Ann Grossman (Italy) Katia Piccolini (Italy) Laura Golarsa
Apr 30	Ilva Trophy; Taranto, Italy; Tier V Clay – $75,000 – 32S/16D; Singles – Doubles	(Soviet Union) Elena Brioukhovets (Soviet Union) Eugenia Maniokova; 7–6^{(7–4)}, 6–1	(Italy) Silvia Farina (Italy) Rita Grande	(France) Pascale Etchemendy (Austria) Petra Ritter	(Denmark) Tine Scheuer-Larsen (United States) Ann Grossman (Italy) Katia Piccolini (Italy) Laura Golarsa

=== May ===
Week	Tournament	Champions	Runners-up	Semifinalists	Quarterfinalists
May 7	Peugeot Italian Open; Rome, Italy; Tier I Clay – $500,000 – 56S/28D; Singles – Doubles	(Socialist Federal Republic of Yugoslavia) Monica Seles; 6–1, 6–1	(United States) Martina Navratilova	(Argentina) Gabriela Sabatini (Canada) Helen Kelesi	(Spain) Conchita Martínez (United States) Jennifer Capriati (Sweden) Catarina Lindqvist (Switzerland) Manuela Maleeva-Fragniere
May 7	Peugeot Italian Open; Rome, Italy; Tier I Clay – $500,000 – 56S/28D; Singles – Doubles	(Canada) Helen Kelesi (Socialist Federal Republic of Yugoslavia) Monica Seles; 6–3, 6–4	(Italy) Laura Garrone (Italy) Laura Golarsa	(Argentina) Gabriela Sabatini (Canada) Helen Kelesi	(Spain) Conchita Martínez (United States) Jennifer Capriati (Sweden) Catarina Lindqvist (Switzerland) Manuela Maleeva-Fragniere
May 14	Lufthansa Cup German Open; West Berlin, West Germany; Tier I Clay – $500,000 – 56S/28D; Singles – Doubles	(Socialist Federal Republic of Yugoslavia) Monica Seles; 6–4, 6–3	(West Germany) Steffi Graf	(Soviet Union) Natasha Zvereva (Italy) Sandra Cecchini	(Soviet Union) Leila Meskhi (Austria) Judith Wiesner (France) Nathalie Tauziat (Spain) Conchita Martínez
May 14	Lufthansa Cup German Open; West Berlin, West Germany; Tier I Clay – $500,000 – 56S/28D; Singles – Doubles	(Australia) Nicole Provis (South Africa) Elna Reinach; 6–2, 6–1	(Australia) Hana Mandlíková (Czechoslovakia) Jana Novotná	(Soviet Union) Natasha Zvereva (Italy) Sandra Cecchini	(Soviet Union) Leila Meskhi (Austria) Judith Wiesner (France) Nathalie Tauziat (Spain) Conchita Martínez
May 21	Internationaux de Strasbourg; Strasbourg, France; Tier IV; Clay – $150,000 – 32S/16D; Singles – Doubles	(Argentina) Mercedes Paz; 6–2, 6–3	(United States) Ann Grossman	(France) Karine Quentrec (Netherlands) Manon Bollegraf	(West Germany) Isabel Cueto (West Germany) Veronika Martinek (Argentina) Florencia Labat (Bulgaria) Elena Pampoulova
May 21	Internationaux de Strasbourg; Strasbourg, France; Tier IV; Clay – $150,000 – 32S/16D; Singles – Doubles	(Australia) Nicole Provis (South Africa) Elna Reinach; 6–1, 6–4	(United States) Kathy Jordan (Australia) Elizabeth Smylie	(France) Karine Quentrec (Netherlands) Manon Bollegraf	(West Germany) Isabel Cueto (West Germany) Veronika Martinek (Argentina) Florencia Labat (Bulgaria) Elena Pampoulova
May 21	Geneva European Open; Geneva, Switzerland; Tier IV; Clay – $150,000 – 32S/16D; Singles – Doubles	(Austria) Barbara Paulus; 2–6, 7–5, 7–6^{(7–3)}	(Canada) Helen Kelesi	(West Germany) Sabine Hack (Switzerland) Emanuela Zardo	(United States) Shaun Stafford (Italy) Cathy Caverzasio (Italy) Laura Garrone (South Africa) Amanda Coetzer
May 21	Geneva European Open; Geneva, Switzerland; Tier IV; Clay – $150,000 – 32S/16D; Singles – Doubles	(Australia) Louise Field (South Africa) Dianne Van Rensburg; 5–7, 7–6^{(7–2)}, 7–5	(United States) Elise Burgin (United States) Betsy Nagelsen	(West Germany) Sabine Hack (Switzerland) Emanuela Zardo	(United States) Shaun Stafford (Italy) Cathy Caverzasio (Italy) Laura Garrone (South Africa) Amanda Coetzer
May 28; June 4	French Open; Paris, France; Grand Slam; Clay – $2,019,720 – 128S/64Q/64D/64X; Singles – Doubles – Mixed doubles	(Socialist Federal Republic of Yugoslavia) Monica Seles; 7–6^{(8–6)}, 6–4	(West Germany) Steffi Graf	(Czechoslovakia) Jana Novotná (United States) Jennifer Capriati	(Spain) Conchita Martínez (Bulgaria) Katerina Maleeva (United States) Mary Joe Fernández (Switzerland) Manuela Maleeva-Fragniere
May 28; June 4	French Open; Paris, France; Grand Slam; Clay – $2,019,720 – 128S/64Q/64D/64X; Singles – Doubles – Mixed doubles	(Czechoslovakia) Jana Novotná (Czechoslovakia) Helena Suková; 6–4, 7–5	(Soviet Union) Larisa Savchenko-Neiland (Soviet Union) Natasha Zvereva	(Czechoslovakia) Jana Novotná (United States) Jennifer Capriati	(Spain) Conchita Martínez (Bulgaria) Katerina Maleeva (United States) Mary Joe Fernández (Switzerland) Manuela Maleeva-Fragniere
May 28; June 4	French Open; Paris, France; Grand Slam; Clay – $2,019,720 – 128S/64Q/64D/64X; Singles – Doubles – Mixed doubles	(Spain) Arantxa Sánchez Vicario (Mexico) Jorge Lozano; 7–6^{(7–5)}, 7–6^{(10–8)}	(Australia) Nicole Provis (South Africa) Danie Visser	(Czechoslovakia) Jana Novotná (United States) Jennifer Capriati	(Spain) Conchita Martínez (Bulgaria) Katerina Maleeva (United States) Mary Joe Fernández (Switzerland) Manuela Maleeva-Fragniere

=== June ===
Week	Tournament	Champions	Runners-up	Semifinalists	Quarterfinalists
Jun 11	Dow Classic; Birmingham, Great Britain; Tier IV; Grass – $150,000 – 56S/28D; Singles – Doubles	(United States) Zina Garrison-Jackson; 6–4, 6–1	(Czechoslovakia) Helena Suková	(France) Nathalie Tauziat (South Africa) Rosalyn Fairbank-Nideffer	(New Zealand) Belinda Cordwell (United States) Anne Smith (United States) Gigi Fernández (Soviet Union) Larisa Savchenko-Neiland
Jun 11	Dow Classic; Birmingham, Great Britain; Tier IV; Grass – $150,000 – 56S/28D; Singles – Doubles	(Soviet Union) Larisa Savchenko-Neiland (Soviet Union) Natasha Zvereva; 3–6, 6–3, 6–3	(South Africa) Lise Gregory (United States) Gretchen Magers	(France) Nathalie Tauziat (South Africa) Rosalyn Fairbank-Nideffer	(New Zealand) Belinda Cordwell (United States) Anne Smith (United States) Gigi Fernández (Soviet Union) Larisa Savchenko-Neiland
Jun 18	Pilkington Glass Championships; Eastbourne, Great Britain; Tier II; Grass – $350,000 – 64S/32D; Singles – Doubles	(United States) Martina Navratilova; 6–0, 6–2	(United States) Gretchen Magers	(Czechoslovakia) Jana Novotná (United States) Lori McNeil	(Soviet Union) Natasha Zvereva (Czechoslovakia) Helena Suková (United States) Mary Joe Fernández (Netherlands) Manon Bollegraf
Jun 18	Pilkington Glass Championships; Eastbourne, Great Britain; Tier II; Grass – $350,000 – 64S/32D; Singles – Doubles	(Soviet Union) Larisa Savchenko-Neiland (Soviet Union) Natasha Zvereva; 2–6, 6–4, 6–4	(United States) Patty Fendick (United States) Zina Garrison-Jackson	(Czechoslovakia) Jana Novotná (United States) Lori McNeil	(Soviet Union) Natasha Zvereva (Czechoslovakia) Helena Suková (United States) Mary Joe Fernández (Netherlands) Manon Bollegraf
Jun 25; July 2	Wimbledon Championships; London, Great Britain; Grand Slam; Grass – $2,561,585 – 128S/64Q/64D/64X; Singles – Doubles – Mixed doubles	(United States) Martina Navratilova; 6–4, 6–1	(United States) Zina Garrison-Jackson	(Argentina) Gabriela Sabatini (West Germany) Steffi Graf	(Czechoslovakia) Jana Novotná (Socialist Federal Republic of Yugoslavia) Monica Seles (Soviet Union) Natasha Zvereva (Bulgaria) Katerina Maleeva
Jun 25; July 2	Wimbledon Championships; London, Great Britain; Grand Slam; Grass – $2,561,585 – 128S/64Q/64D/64X; Singles – Doubles – Mixed doubles	(Czechoslovakia) Jana Novotná (Czechoslovakia) Helena Suková; 6–4, 6–1	(United States) Kathy Jordan (Australia) Elizabeth Smylie	(Argentina) Gabriela Sabatini (West Germany) Steffi Graf	(Czechoslovakia) Jana Novotná (Socialist Federal Republic of Yugoslavia) Monica Seles (Soviet Union) Natasha Zvereva (Bulgaria) Katerina Maleeva
Jun 25; July 2	Wimbledon Championships; London, Great Britain; Grand Slam; Grass – $2,561,585 – 128S/64Q/64D/64X; Singles – Doubles – Mixed doubles	(United States) Zina Garrison-Jackson (United States) Rick Leach; 7–5, 6–2	(Australia) Elizabeth Smylie (Australia) John Fitzgerald	(Argentina) Gabriela Sabatini (West Germany) Steffi Graf	(Czechoslovakia) Jana Novotná (Socialist Federal Republic of Yugoslavia) Monica Seles (Soviet Union) Natasha Zvereva (Bulgaria) Katerina Maleeva

=== July ===
Week	Tournament	Champions	Runners-up	Semifinalists	Quarterfinalists
Jul 9	Swedish Open; Båstad, Sweden; Tier V Clay – $75,000 – 32S/16D	(Italy) Sandra Cecchini; 6–1, 6–2	(Switzerland) Csilla Bartos	(Bulgaria) Elena Pampoulova (Czechoslovakia) Radka Zrubáková	(Belgium) Sabine Appelmans (Argentina) Mercedes Paz (Austria) Sandra Dopfer (West Germany) Sabine Hack
Jul 9	Swedish Open; Båstad, Sweden; Tier V Clay – $75,000 – 32S/16D	(Argentina) Mercedes Paz (Denmark) Tine Scheuer-Larsen; 6–3, 6–7^{(10–12)}, 6–2	(Netherlands) Carin Bakkum (Netherlands) Nicole Muns-Jagerman	(Bulgaria) Elena Pampoulova (Czechoslovakia) Radka Zrubáková	(Belgium) Sabine Appelmans (Argentina) Mercedes Paz (Austria) Sandra Dopfer (West Germany) Sabine Hack
Jul 9	Torneo Internazionale; Palermo, Italy; Tier V Clay – $75,000 – 32S/16D; Singles – Doubles	(West Germany) Isabel Cueto; 6–2, 6–3	(Austria) Barbara Paulus	(Italy) Francesca Romano (Austria) Beate Reinstadler	(Switzerland) Emanuela Zardo (Italy) Katia Piccolini (Italy) Cathy Caverzasio (France) Maïder Laval
Jul 9	Torneo Internazionale; Palermo, Italy; Tier V Clay – $75,000 – 32S/16D; Singles – Doubles	(Italy) Laura Garrone (Luxembourg) Karin Kschwendt; 6–2, 6–4	(Argentina) Florencia Labat (Italy) Barbara Romanò	(Italy) Francesca Romano (Austria) Beate Reinstadler	(Switzerland) Emanuela Zardo (Italy) Katia Piccolini (Italy) Cathy Caverzasio (France) Maïder Laval
Jul 16	Estoril Open; Oeiras, Portugal; Tier V Clay – $100,000 – 32S/16D; Singles – Doubles	(Italy) Federica Bonsignori; 2–6, 6–3, 6–3	(Italy) Laura Garrone	(West Germany) Sabine Hack (Argentina) Patricia Tarabini	(West Germany) Isabel Cueto (France) Catherine Mothes (Switzerland) Emanuela Zardo (Italy) Katia Piccolini
Jul 16	Estoril Open; Oeiras, Portugal; Tier V Clay – $100,000 – 32S/16D; Singles – Doubles	(Argentina) Patricia Tarabini (Italy) Sandra Cecchini; 1–6, 6–2, 6–3	(Netherlands) Carin Bakkum (Netherlands) Nicole Muns-Jagerman	(West Germany) Sabine Hack (Argentina) Patricia Tarabini	(West Germany) Isabel Cueto (France) Catherine Mothes (Switzerland) Emanuela Zardo (Italy) Katia Piccolini
Jul 16	Virginia Slims of Newport; Newport, United States; Tier III; Grass – $225,000 – 32S/16D; Singles – Doubles	(Spain) Arantxa Sánchez Vicario; 7–6^{(7–2)}, 4–6, 7–5	(United Kingdom) Jo Durie	(United States) Gretchen Magers (United States) Anne Smith	(United States) Meredith McGrath (Australia) Louise Field (South Africa) Rosalyn Fairbank-Nideffer (Australia) Elizabeth Smylie
Jul 16	Virginia Slims of Newport; Newport, United States; Tier III; Grass – $225,000 – 32S/16D; Singles – Doubles	(South Africa) Lise Gregory (United States) Gretchen Magers; 7–6^{(9–7)}, 6–1	(United States) Patty Fendick (United States) Anne Smith	(United States) Gretchen Magers (United States) Anne Smith	(United States) Meredith McGrath (Australia) Louise Field (South Africa) Rosalyn Fairbank-Nideffer (Australia) Elizabeth Smylie
Jul 23	Fed Cup; Norcross, United States, Hard; Team Event; Hard – $0 – 32 Teams	United States; 2–1	Soviet Union	Austria; Spain	Czechoslovakia; Great Britain; Netherlands; France
July 30	Canadian Open; Montreal, Canada; Tier I Hard – $500,000 – 56S/28D; Singles – Doubles	(West Germany) Steffi Graf; 6–1, 6–7^{(6–8)}, 6–3	(Bulgaria) Katerina Maleeva	(France) Nathalie Tauziat (Argentina) Gabriela Sabatini	(Soviet Union) Natasha Zvereva (Switzerland) Manuela Maleeva-Fragniere (Japan) Naoko Sawamatsu (United States) Jennifer Capriati
July 30	Canadian Open; Montreal, Canada; Tier I Hard – $500,000 – 56S/28D; Singles – Doubles	(United States) Betsy Nagelsen (Argentina) Gabriela Sabatini; 3–6, 6–2, 6–2	(Canada) Helen Kelesi (Italy) Raffaella Reggi	(France) Nathalie Tauziat (Argentina) Gabriela Sabatini	(Soviet Union) Natasha Zvereva (Switzerland) Manuela Maleeva-Fragniere (Japan) Naoko Sawamatsu (United States) Jennifer Capriati

=== August ===
Week	Tournament	Champions	Runners-up	Semifinalists	Quarterfinalists
Aug 6	Virginia Slims of Albuquerque; Albuquerque, United States; Tier IV; Hard – $150,000 – 32S/16D; Singles – Doubles	(Czechoslovakia) Jana Novotná; 6–4, 6–4	(Peru) Laura Gildemeister	(United States) Anne Smith (United States) Susan Sloane	(France) Karine Quentrec (South Africa) Amanda Coetzer (South Africa) Dianne Van Rensburg (Australia) Anne Minter
Aug 6	Virginia Slims of Albuquerque; Albuquerque, United States; Tier IV; Hard – $150,000 – 32S/16D; Singles – Doubles	(United States) Meredith McGrath (United States) Anne Smith; 7–6^{(7–2)}, 6–4	(United States) Mareen Louie Harper (United States) Wendy White	(United States) Anne Smith (United States) Susan Sloane	(France) Karine Quentrec (South Africa) Amanda Coetzer (South Africa) Dianne Van Rensburg (Australia) Anne Minter
Aug 6	Great American Bank Classic; San Diego, United States; Tier III; Hard – $225,000 – 32S/16D; Singles – Doubles	(West Germany) Steffi Graf; 6–3, 6–2	(Switzerland) Manuela Maleeva-Fragniere	(United States) Zina Garrison-Jackson (Austria) Barbara Paulus	(France) Nathalie Tauziat (United States) Terry Phelps (United States) Ann Grossman (South Africa) Rosalyn Fairbank-Nideffer
Aug 6	Great American Bank Classic; San Diego, United States; Tier III; Hard – $225,000 – 32S/16D; Singles – Doubles	(United States) Patty Fendick (United States) Zina Garrison-Jackson; 6–4, 7–6^{(7–5)}	(United States) Elise Burgin (South Africa) Rosalyn Fairbank-Nideffer	(United States) Zina Garrison-Jackson (Austria) Barbara Paulus	(France) Nathalie Tauziat (United States) Terry Phelps (United States) Ann Grossman (South Africa) Rosalyn Fairbank-Nideffer
Aug 13	Virginia Slims of Los Angeles; Manhattan Beach, United States; Tier II; Hard – $350,000 – 56S/28D	(Socialist Federal Republic of Yugoslavia) Monica Seles; 6–4, 3–6, 7–6^{(8–6)}	(United States) Martina Navratilova	(United States) Zina Garrison-Jackson (United States) Mary Joe Fernández	(United States) Kathy Rinaldi (Bulgaria) Katerina Maleeva (United States) Stephanie Rehe (United States) Amy Frazier
Aug 13	Virginia Slims of Los Angeles; Manhattan Beach, United States; Tier II; Hard – $350,000 – 56S/28D	(United States) Gigi Fernández (Czechoslovakia) Jana Novotná; 6–3, 4–6, 6–4	(Argentina) Mercedes Paz (Argentina) Gabriela Sabatini	(United States) Zina Garrison-Jackson (United States) Mary Joe Fernández	(United States) Kathy Rinaldi (Bulgaria) Katerina Maleeva (United States) Stephanie Rehe (United States) Amy Frazier
Aug 20	OTB International Open; Schenectady, United States; Tier V Hard – $75,000 – 32S/16D; Singles – Doubles	(West Germany) Anke Huber; 6–1, 5–7, 6–4	(United States) Marianne Werdel	(West Germany) Wiltrud Probst (Argentina) Mercedes Paz	(West Germany) Sylvia Hanika (France) Alexia Dechaume (South Africa) Elna Reinach (Italy) Raffaella Reggi
Aug 20	OTB International Open; Schenectady, United States; Tier V Hard – $75,000 – 32S/16D; Singles – Doubles	(United States) Alysia May (Japan) Nana Miyagi; 6–4, 5–7, 6–3	(Italy) Linda Ferrando (West Germany) Wiltrud Probst	(West Germany) Wiltrud Probst (Argentina) Mercedes Paz	(West Germany) Sylvia Hanika (France) Alexia Dechaume (South Africa) Elna Reinach (Italy) Raffaella Reggi
Aug 27; Sep 3	US Open; New York City, United States; Grand Slam; Hard – $2,707,250 – 128S/64Q/64D/32X; Singles – Doubles – Mixed doubles	(Argentina) Gabriela Sabatini; 6–2, 7–6^{(7–4)}	(West Germany) Steffi Graf	(Spain) Arantxa Sánchez Vicario (United States) Mary Joe Fernández	(Czechoslovakia) Jana Novotná (United States) Zina Garrison-Jackson (Soviet Union) Leila Meskhi (Switzerland) Manuela Maleeva-Fragniere
Aug 27; Sep 3	US Open; New York City, United States; Grand Slam; Hard – $2,707,250 – 128S/64Q/64D/32X; Singles – Doubles – Mixed doubles	(United States) Gigi Fernández (United States) Martina Navratilova; 6–2, 6–4	(Czechoslovakia) Jana Novotná (Czechoslovakia) Helena Suková	(Spain) Arantxa Sánchez Vicario (United States) Mary Joe Fernández	(Czechoslovakia) Jana Novotná (United States) Zina Garrison-Jackson (Soviet Union) Leila Meskhi (Switzerland) Manuela Maleeva-Fragniere
Aug 27; Sep 3	US Open; New York City, United States; Grand Slam; Hard – $2,707,250 – 128S/64Q/64D/32X; Singles – Doubles – Mixed doubles	(Australia) Elizabeth Smylie (Australia) Todd Woodbridge; 6–4, 6–2	(Soviet Union) Natasha Zvereva (United States) Jim Pugh	(Spain) Arantxa Sánchez Vicario (United States) Mary Joe Fernández	(Czechoslovakia) Jana Novotná (United States) Zina Garrison-Jackson (Soviet Union) Leila Meskhi (Switzerland) Manuela Maleeva-Fragniere

=== September ===
Week	Tournament	Champions	Runners-up	Semifinalists	Quarterfinalists
Sep 10	Austrian Ladies Open; Kitzbühel, Austria; Tier V Clay – $100,000 – 32S/16D	(West Germany) Claudia Kohde-Kilsch; 7–6^{(7–5)}, 6–4	(Australia) Rachel McQuillan	(Austria) Judith Wiesner (Italy) Sandra Cecchini	(Czechoslovakia) Petra Langrová (West Germany) Veronika Martinek (Italy) Cathy Caverzasio (Czechoslovakia) Iva Budařová
Sep 10	Austrian Ladies Open; Kitzbühel, Austria; Tier V Clay – $100,000 – 32S/16D	(Czechoslovakia) Petra Langrová (Czechoslovakia) Radka Zrubáková; 6–0, 6–4	(Italy) Sandra Cecchini (Argentina) Patricia Tarabini	(Austria) Judith Wiesner (Italy) Sandra Cecchini	(Czechoslovakia) Petra Langrová (West Germany) Veronika Martinek (Italy) Cathy Caverzasio (Czechoslovakia) Iva Budařová
Sep 10	Athens Trophy; Athens, Greece; Tier V Clay – $75,000 – 32S/16D; Singles – Doubles	(Sweden) Cecilia Dahlman; 7–5, 7–5	(Italy) Katia Piccolini	(Italy) Federica Bonsignori (France) Mary Pierce	(West Germany) Sabine Hack (Switzerland) Emanuela Zardo (United Kingdom) Samantha Smith (Finland) Petra Thorén
Sep 10	Athens Trophy; Athens, Greece; Tier V Clay – $75,000 – 32S/16D; Singles – Doubles	(Italy) Laura Garrone (Luxembourg) Karin Kschwendt; 6–0, 1–6, 7–6^{(8–6)}	(Czechoslovakia) Leona Lásková (Czechoslovakia) Jana Pospíšilová	(Italy) Federica Bonsignori (France) Mary Pierce	(West Germany) Sabine Hack (Switzerland) Emanuela Zardo (United Kingdom) Samantha Smith (Finland) Petra Thorén
Sep 10	Light n' Lively Doubles Championships; Orlando, United States; Clay – $175,000 – 12D; Doubles	(Soviet Union) Larisa Savchenko (Soviet Union) Natasha Zvereva; 6–4, 6–1	(Netherlands) Manon Bollegraf (United States) Meredith McGrath		
Sep 17	Open Clarins; Paris, France; Tier IV; Clay – $150,000 – 32S/16D; Singles – Doubles	(Spain) Conchita Martínez; 7–5, 6–3	(Argentina) Patricia Tarabini	(France) Julie Halard (Italy) Sandra Cecchini	(Australia) Rachel McQuillan (United States) Debbie Graham (Czechoslovakia) Petra Langrová (Czechoslovakia) Regina Rajchrtová
Sep 17	Open Clarins; Paris, France; Tier IV; Clay – $150,000 – 32S/16D; Singles – Doubles	(Australia) Kristin Godridge (Australia) Kirrily Sharpe; 4–6, 6–3, 6–1	(France) Alexia Dechaume (France) Nathalie Herreman	(France) Julie Halard (Italy) Sandra Cecchini	(Australia) Rachel McQuillan (United States) Debbie Graham (Czechoslovakia) Petra Langrová (Czechoslovakia) Regina Rajchrtová
Sep 24	Volkswagen Damen Grand Prix; Leipzig, East Germany; Tier III; Carpet (i) – $225,000 – 28S/16D; Singles – Doubles	(West Germany) Steffi Graf; 6–1, 6–1	(Spain) Arantxa Sánchez Vicario	(Spain) Conchita Martínez (Austria) Barbara Paulus	(Netherlands) Manon Bollegraf (West Germany) Claudia Kohde-Kilsch (Austria) Judith Wiesner (Czechoslovakia) Andrea Strnadová
Sep 24	Volkswagen Damen Grand Prix; Leipzig, East Germany; Tier III; Carpet (i) – $225,000 – 28S/16D; Singles – Doubles	(United States) Gretchen Magers (South Africa) Lise Gregory; 4–6, 6–3, 6–1	(Netherlands) Manon Bollegraf (United Kingdom) Jo Durie	(Spain) Conchita Martínez (Austria) Barbara Paulus	(Netherlands) Manon Bollegraf (West Germany) Claudia Kohde-Kilsch (Austria) Judith Wiesner (Czechoslovakia) Andrea Strnadová
Sep 24	Nichirei International Championships; Tokyo, Japan; Tier II event Carpet (i) – $350,000 – 28S/16D; Singles – Doubles	(United States) Mary Joe Fernández; 3–6, 6–2, 6–3	(United States) Amy Frazier	(Switzerland) Manuela Maleeva-Fragniere (Bulgaria) Katerina Maleeva	(United States) Martina Navratilova (Czechoslovakia) Helena Suková (United States) Jennifer Capriati (Socialist Federal Republic of Yugoslavia) Monica Seles
Sep 24	Nichirei International Championships; Tokyo, Japan; Tier II event Carpet (i) – $350,000 – 28S/16D; Singles – Doubles	(United States) Mary Joe Fernández (United States) Robin White; 4–6, 6–3, 7–6^{(7–4)}	(United States) Gigi Fernández (United States) Martina Navratilova	(Switzerland) Manuela Maleeva-Fragniere (Bulgaria) Katerina Maleeva	(United States) Martina Navratilova (Czechoslovakia) Helena Suková (United States) Jennifer Capriati (Socialist Federal Republic of Yugoslavia) Monica Seles
Sep 24	Tournoi de Bayonne; Bayonne, France; Tier V Carpet (i) – $100,000 – 32S/16D	(France) Nathalie Tauziat; 6–3, 7–6^{(10–8)}	(West Germany) Anke Huber	(France) Catherine Tanvier (France) Noëlle van Lottum	(United States) Zina Garrison-Jackson (France) Pascale Paradis (France) Maïder Laval (Sweden) Cecilia Dahlman
Sep 24	Tournoi de Bayonne; Bayonne, France; Tier V Carpet (i) – $100,000 – 32S/16D	(Australia) Louise Field (France) Catherine Tanvier; 7–6^{(7–3)}, 6–7^{(5–7)}, 7–6^{(7–5)}	(Australia) Jo-Anne Faull (Australia) Rachel McQuillan	(France) Catherine Tanvier (France) Noëlle van Lottum	(United States) Zina Garrison-Jackson (France) Pascale Paradis (France) Maïder Laval (Sweden) Cecilia Dahlman

=== October ===
Week	Tournament	Champions	Runners-up	Semifinalists	Quarterfinalists
Oct 1	Kraft General Foods of Moscow; Moscow, Soviet Union; Tier V Carpet (i) – $100,000 – 32S/16D; Singles – Doubles	(Soviet Union) Leila Meskhi; 6–4, 6–4	(Soviet Union) Elena Brioukhovets	(Australia) Anne Minter (United States) Gretchen Magers	(Czechoslovakia) Karina Habšudová (Australia) Kristin Godridge (Australia) Rachel McQuillan (Austria) Beate Reinstadler
Oct 1	Kraft General Foods of Moscow; Moscow, Soviet Union; Tier V Carpet (i) – $100,000 – 32S/16D; Singles – Doubles	(United States) Gretchen Magers (United States) Robin White; 6–2, 6–4	(Soviet Union) Elena Brioukhovets (Soviet Union) Svetlana Parkhomenko	(Australia) Anne Minter (United States) Gretchen Magers	(Czechoslovakia) Karina Habšudová (Australia) Kristin Godridge (Australia) Rachel McQuillan (Austria) Beate Reinstadler
Oct 8	BMW European Indoors; Zürich, Switzerland; Tier II; Carpet (i) – $350,000 – 32S/16D; Singles – Doubles	(Germany) Steffi Graf; 6–3, 6–2	(Argentina) Gabriela Sabatini	(Switzerland) Manuela Maleeva-Fragniere (Czechoslovakia) Jana Novotná	(France) Nathalie Tauziat (Netherlands) Brenda Schultz (Germany) Wiltrud Probst (Czechoslovakia) Helena Suková
Oct 8	BMW European Indoors; Zürich, Switzerland; Tier II; Carpet (i) – $350,000 – 32S/16D; Singles – Doubles	(Netherlands) Manon Bollegraf (Germany) Eva Pfaff; 7–5, 6–4	(France) Catherine Suire (South Africa) Dianne Van Rensburg	(Switzerland) Manuela Maleeva-Fragniere (Czechoslovakia) Jana Novotná	(France) Nathalie Tauziat (Netherlands) Brenda Schultz (Germany) Wiltrud Probst (Czechoslovakia) Helena Suková
Oct 15	Porsche Tennis Grand Prix; Filderstadt, Germany; Tier II; Carpet (i) – $350,000 – 32S/16D	(United States) Mary Joe Fernández; 6–1, 6–3	(Austria) Barbara Paulus	(Argentina) Gabriela Sabatini (Bulgaria) Katerina Maleeva	(Czechoslovakia) Helena Suková (United States) Zina Garrison-Jackson (Czechoslovakia) Jana Novotná (Belgium) Sabine Appelmans
Oct 15	Porsche Tennis Grand Prix; Filderstadt, Germany; Tier II; Carpet (i) – $350,000 – 32S/16D	(United States) Mary Joe Fernández (United States) Zina Garrison-Jackson; 7–5, 6–3	(Argentina) Mercedes Paz (Spain) Arantxa Sánchez Vicario	(Argentina) Gabriela Sabatini (Bulgaria) Katerina Maleeva	(Czechoslovakia) Helena Suková (United States) Zina Garrison-Jackson (Czechoslovakia) Jana Novotná (Belgium) Sabine Appelmans
Oct 15	Arizona Classic; Scottsdale, United States; Tier IV; Hard – $150,000 – 32S/16D	(Spain) Conchita Martínez; 7–5, 6–1	(United States) Marianne Werdel	(United Kingdom) Monique Javer (United States) Amy Frazier	(South Africa) Amanda Coetzer (United States) Erika deLone (United States) Susan Sloane (Netherlands) Stephanie Rottier
Oct 15	Arizona Classic; Scottsdale, United States; Tier IV; Hard – $150,000 – 32S/16D	(United States) Elise Burgin (Canada) Helen Kelesi; 6–4, 6–2	(United States) Sandy Collins (United States) Ronni Reis	(United Kingdom) Monique Javer (United States) Amy Frazier	(South Africa) Amanda Coetzer (United States) Erika deLone (United States) Susan Sloane (Netherlands) Stephanie Rottier
Oct 22	Midland Bank Championships; Brighton, Great Britain; Tier II; Carpet (i) – $350,000 – 32S/16D; Singles – Doubles	(Germany) Steffi Graf; 7–5, 6–3	(Czechoslovakia) Helena Suková	(Sweden) Catarina Lindqvist (Bulgaria) Katerina Maleeva	(France) Nathalie Tauziat (Italy) Cathy Caverzasio (United Kingdom) Sara Gomer (Italy) Sandra Cecchini
Oct 22	Midland Bank Championships; Brighton, Great Britain; Tier II; Carpet (i) – $350,000 – 32S/16D; Singles – Doubles	(Czechoslovakia) Helena Suková (France) Nathalie Tauziat; 6–1, 6–4	(United Kingdom) Jo Durie (Soviet Union) Natasha Zvereva	(Sweden) Catarina Lindqvist (Bulgaria) Katerina Maleeva	(France) Nathalie Tauziat (Italy) Cathy Caverzasio (United Kingdom) Sara Gomer (Italy) Sandra Cecchini
Oct 22	Puerto Rico Open; Dorado, Puerto Rico; Tier IV; Hard – $150,000 – 32S/16D; Singles – Doubles	(United States) Jennifer Capriati; 5–7, 6–4, 6–2	(United States) Zina Garrison-Jackson	(United States) Carrie Cunningham (United States) Gigi Fernández	(United States) Ann Grossman (Argentina) Florencia Labat (United States) Audra Keller (Sweden) Maria Strandlund
Oct 22	Puerto Rico Open; Dorado, Puerto Rico; Tier IV; Hard – $150,000 – 32S/16D; Singles – Doubles	(Soviet Union) Elena Brioukhovets (Soviet Union) Natalia Medvedeva; 6–4, 6–2	(United States) Amy Frazier (New Zealand) Julie Richardson	(United States) Carrie Cunningham (United States) Gigi Fernández	(United States) Ann Grossman (Argentina) Florencia Labat (United States) Audra Keller (Sweden) Maria Strandlund
Oct 29	Virginia Slims of Nashville; Brentwood, United States; Tier IV; Hard – $150,000 – 32S/16D; Singles – Doubles	(Soviet Union) Natalia Medvedeva; 6–3, 7–6^{(7–3)}	(United States) Susan Sloane	(Soviet Union) Elena Brioukhovets (South Africa) Elna Reinach	(Sweden) Cecilia Dahlman (United States) Tami Whitlinger (Italy) Raffaella Reggi (United States) Linda Harvey-Wild
Oct 29	Virginia Slims of Nashville; Brentwood, United States; Tier IV; Hard – $150,000 – 32S/16D; Singles – Doubles	(United States) Kathy Jordan (Soviet Union) Larisa Neiland; 6–1, 6–2	(Netherlands) Brenda Schultz (Netherlands) Caroline Vis	(Soviet Union) Elena Brioukhovets (South Africa) Elna Reinach	(Sweden) Cecilia Dahlman (United States) Tami Whitlinger (Italy) Raffaella Reggi (United States) Linda Harvey-Wild
Oct 29	Virginia Slims of California; Oakland, United States; Tier II; Carpet (i) – $350,000 – 28S/16D; Singles – Doubles	(Socialist Federal Republic of Yugoslavia) Monica Seles; 6–3, 7–6^{(7–5)}	(United States) Martina Navratilova	(United States) Meredith McGrath (United States) Zina Garrison-Jackson	(Czechoslovakia) Radka Zrubáková (South Africa) Rosalyn Fairbank-Nideffer (United States) Marianne Werdel (United States) Stephanie Rehe
Oct 29	Virginia Slims of California; Oakland, United States; Tier II; Carpet (i) – $350,000 – 28S/16D; Singles – Doubles	(United States) Meredith McGrath (United States) Anne Smith; 2–6, 6–0, 6–4	(South Africa) Rosalyn Fairbank-Nideffer (United States) Robin White	(United States) Meredith McGrath (United States) Zina Garrison-Jackson	(Czechoslovakia) Radka Zrubáková (South Africa) Rosalyn Fairbank-Nideffer (United States) Marianne Werdel (United States) Stephanie Rehe

=== November ===
Week	Tournament	Champions	Runners-up	Semifinalists	Quarterfinalists
Nov 5	Virginia Slims of New England; Worcester, United States; Tier II; Carpet (i) – $350,000 – 32S/16D	(Germany) Steffi Graf; 7–6^{(7–5)}, 6–3	(Argentina) Gabriela Sabatini	(Switzerland) Manuela Maleeva-Fragniere (United States) Mary Joe Fernández	(Soviet Union) Natasha Zvereva (Argentina) Mercedes Paz (Czechoslovakia) Helena Suková (United States) Amy Frazier
Nov 5	Virginia Slims of New England; Worcester, United States; Tier II; Carpet (i) – $350,000 – 32S/16D	(United States) Gigi Fernández (Czechoslovakia) Helena Suková; 3–6, 6–3, 6–3	(United States) Mary Joe Fernández (Czechoslovakia) Jana Novotná	(Switzerland) Manuela Maleeva-Fragniere (United States) Mary Joe Fernández	(Soviet Union) Natasha Zvereva (Argentina) Mercedes Paz (Czechoslovakia) Helena Suková (United States) Amy Frazier
Nov 5	Jello Tennis Classic; Indianapolis, United States; Tier IV; Hard (i) – $150,000 – 32S/16D; Singles – Doubles	(Spain) Conchita Martínez; 6–4, 6–2	(Soviet Union) Leila Meskhi	(Bulgaria) Katerina Maleeva (Soviet Union) Natalia Medvedeva	(United States) Susan Sloane (Italy) Raffaella Reggi (United States) Meredith McGrath (Australia) Nicole Provis
Nov 5	Jello Tennis Classic; Indianapolis, United States; Tier IV; Hard (i) – $150,000 – 32S/16D; Singles – Doubles	(United States) Patty Fendick (United States) Meredith McGrath; 6–1, 6–1	(United States) Katrina Adams (Canada) Jill Hetherington	(Bulgaria) Katerina Maleeva (Soviet Union) Natalia Medvedeva	(United States) Susan Sloane (Italy) Raffaella Reggi (United States) Meredith McGrath (Australia) Nicole Provis
Nov 12	Virginia Slims Championships; New York City, United States; Year-end Championship; Carpet (i) – $3,000,000 – 16S/8D; Singles – Doubles	(Socialist Federal Republic of Yugoslavia) Monica Seles; 6–4, 5–7, 3–6, 6–4, 6–2	(Argentina) Gabriela Sabatini	(Germany) Steffi Graf (United States) Mary Joe Fernández	(Bulgaria) Katerina Maleeva (Spain) Conchita Martínez (Switzerland) Manuela Maleeva-Fragniere (Spain) Arantxa Sánchez Vicario
Nov 12	Virginia Slims Championships; New York City, United States; Year-end Championship; Carpet (i) – $3,000,000 – 16S/8D; Singles – Doubles	(United States) Kathy Jordan (Australia) Elizabeth Smylie; 7–6^{(7–4)}, 6–4	(Argentina) Mercedes Paz (Spain) Arantxa Sánchez Vicario	(Germany) Steffi Graf (United States) Mary Joe Fernández	(Bulgaria) Katerina Maleeva (Spain) Conchita Martínez (Switzerland) Manuela Maleeva-Fragniere (Spain) Arantxa Sánchez Vicario

== Rankings ==
Below are the 1990 WTA year-end rankings (November 26, 1990) in both singles and doubles competition:

Singles Year-end Ranking
No	Player Name	Points	1989	Change
1	Steffi Graf (GER)*	278.1021	1	=
2	Monica Seles (YUG)	203.7537	6	+4
3	Martina Navratilova (USA)	199.4231	2	-1
4	Mary Joe Fernández (USA)	147.0286	12	+8
5	Gabriela Sabatini (ARG)	137.0174	3	-2
6	Katerina Maleeva (BUL)	115.8375	15	+9
7	Arantxa Sánchez Vicario (ESP)	112.6067	5	-2
8	Jennifer Capriati (USA)	103.4132	NR	NR
9	Manuela Maleeva-Fragniere (SUI)	103.1532	9	=
10	Zina Garrison-Jackson (USA)	100.5247	4	-6
11	Conchita Martínez (ESP)	98.5629	7	-4
12	Natasha Zvereva (URS)	77.5000	27	+15
13	Jana Novotná (CZE)	77.2556	11	-2
14	Helena Suková (CZE)	77.1402	8	-6
15	Barbara Paulus (AUT)	69.9286	24	+9
16	Amy Frazier (USA)	64.0667	33	+17
17	Judith Wiesner (AUT)	62.7778	35	+18
18	Nathalie Tauziat (FRA)	60.3500	25	+7
19	Leila Meskhi (URS)	53.7500	30	+11
20	Sandra Cecchini (ITA)	41.8000	26	+6

Doubles Year-end Ranking
No	Player Name	Points	1989	Change
1	Helena Suková (CZE)	413.6944	2	+1
2	Jana Novotná (CZE)	387.3147	5	+3
3	Gigi Fernández (USA)	335.6825	7	+4
4	Martina Navratilova (USA)	309.4167	1	-3
5	Natasha Zvereva (URS)	243.7574	6	+1
6	Mary Joe Fernández (USA)	237.4000	8	+2
7	Larisa Savchenko (URS)	231.9031	3	-4
8	Arantxa Sánchez Vicario (ESP)	222.8333	49	+31
9	Kathy Jordan (USA)	219.1909	65	+56
10	Elizabeth Smylie (AUS)	218.0220	14	+4
11	Patty Fendick (USA)	199.3477	15	+4
12	Robin White (USA)	194.9389	12	=
13	Zina Garrison (USA)	178.7692	9	-4
14	Mercedes Paz (ARG)	166.3103	41	+27
15	Betsy Nagelsen (USA)	164.0500	23	+6
16	Meredith McGrath (USA)	161.3462	33	+17
17	Anne Smith (USA)	148.3911	129	+112
18	Gretchen Magers (USA)	134.9474	29	+11
19	Elna Reinach (RSA)	128.5588	20	+1
20	Lise Gregory (RSA)	125.9091	35	+15

* West Germany (FRG) prior to 3 October 1990.

== See also ==
- 1990 ATP Tour
