= 1988 Virginia Slims of Kansas – Singles =

Singles
- 1988 Virginia Slims of Kansas
- 1987 Champion: (United States) Barbara Potter

Final
- Champion: (Bulgaria) Manuela Maleeva
- Runner-up: (West Germany) Sylvia Hanika
- Score: 7–6, 7–5

Events
Singles	Doubles
← 1987 ·	Virginia Slims of Kansas	· 1989 →

Barbara Potter was the defending champion but lost in the second round to Pascale Paradis.

Manuela Maleeva won in the final 7–6, 7–5 against Sylvia Hanika.

== Seeds ==
A champion seed is indicated in bold text while text in italics indicates the round in which that seed was eliminated.

1. (Bulgaria) **Manuela Maleeva (champion)**
2. (United States) Barbara Potter (second round)
3. (West Germany) Sylvia Hanika (final)
4. (Australia) Dianne Balestrat (first round)
5. (United States) Stephanie Rehe (first round)
6. (Czechoslovakia) Jana Novotná (quarterfinals)
7. n/a
8. (West Germany) Claudia Porwik (first round)

== Draw ==
=== Key ===
- Q = Qualifier
- WC = Wild card
- LL = Lucky loser
- Alt = Alternate
- SE = Special exempt
- PR = Protected ranking
- ITF = ITF entry
- JE = Junior exempt
- w/o = Walkover
- r = Retired
- d = Defaulted
- SR = Special ranking

First round
1	(Bulgaria) **M Maleeva**	**6**	**6**
(Czechoslovakia) I Budařová	2	2
(Czechoslovakia) **R Zrubáková**	**6**	5	**7**
(United States) S Sloane	3	**7**	5
(Poland) **I Kuczyńska**	**6**	**6**
(South Africa) K Schimper	2	4
(New Zealand) B Cordwell	4	5
6	(Czechoslovakia) **J Novotná**	**6**	**7**
4	(Australia) D Balestrat	6	1
(Soviet Union) **N Bykova**	**7**	**6**
(United States) B Nagelsen	**6**	2	6
(Brazil) **G Miró**	2	**6**	**7**
(Sweden) M Lindström	2	3
(United States) **M Gurney**	**6**	**6**
(Soviet Union) **S Parkhomenko**	**6**	**6**
8	(West Germany) C Porwik	4	2
5	(United States) S Rehe	0	2
(United States) **P Harper**	**6**	**6**
(France) **N Herreman**	3	**6**	**6**
Q	(New Zealand) J Richardson	**6**	4	3
(France) **C Tanvier**	**6**	**6**
Q	(United States) A Frazier	3	2
(France) E Derly	1	4
3	(West Germany) **S Hanika**	**6**	**6**
LL	(United States) C MacGregor	**6**	4	0
Q	(Netherlands) **H Witvoet**	4	**6**	**6**
(Czechoslovakia) A Holíková	3	5
(Netherlands) **B Schultz**	**6**	**7**
(France) **P Paradis**	**6**	**6**
(United States) R Casals	2	2
Q	(South Africa) D van Rensburg	0	4
2	(United States) **B Potter**	**6**	**6**

Second round
1	(Bulgaria) **M Maleeva**	**6**	**6**
(Czechoslovakia) R Zrubáková	3	2
(Poland) I Kuczyńska	**7**	2	6
6	(Czechoslovakia) **J Novotná**	6	**6**	**7**
(Soviet Union) **N Bykova**	**6**	**6**
(Brazil) G Miró	2	1
(United States) M Gurney	**6**	4	3
(Soviet Union) **S Parkhomenko**	4	**6**	**6**
(United States) **P Harper**	4	**6**	**6**
(France) N Herreman	**6**	4	2
(France) C Tanvier	5	2
3	(West Germany) **S Hanika**	**7**	**6**
Q	(Netherlands) **H Witvoet**	**6**	**7**
(Netherlands) B Schultz	2	6
(France) **P Paradis**	1	**6**	**6**
2	(United States) B Potter	**6**	4	3

Quarterfinals
1	(Bulgaria) **M Maleeva**	**6**	5	**7**
6	(Czechoslovakia) J Novotná	3	**7**	5
(Soviet Union) N Bykova	5	**6**	2
(Soviet Union) **S Parkhomenko**	**7**	4	**6**
(United States) P Harper	**6**	6	3
3	(West Germany) **S Hanika**	2	**7**	**6**
Q	(Netherlands) **H Witvoet**	**6**	**6**
(France) P Paradis	4	4

Semifinals
1	(Bulgaria) **M Maleeva**	**6**	**6**
(Soviet Union) S Parkhomenko	2	1
3	(West Germany) **S Hanika**	4	**6**	**6**
Q	(Netherlands) H Witvoet	**6**	3	3

Final
1	(Bulgaria) **Manuela Maleeva**	**7**	**7**
3	(West Germany) Sylvia Hanika	6	5
