= 1989 Virginia Slims of Kansas – Doubles =

Doubles
- 1989 Virginia Slims of Kansas
- 1988 Champions: (Soviet Union) Natalia Bykova (Soviet Union) Svetlana Parkhomenko

Final
- Champions: (Netherlands) Manon Bollegraf (South Africa) Lise Gregory
- Runners-up: (United States) Sandy Collins (Soviet Union) Leila Meskhi
- Score: 6–2, 7–6

Details
- Draw: 16
- Seeds: 4

Events
| Singles | Doubles |
| ← 1988 · | Virginia Slims of Kansas | · 1990 → |

Natalia Bykova and Svetlana Parkhomenko were the defending champions of the doubles title at the 1989 Virginia Slims of Kansas tennis tournament but did not compete that year.

Manon Bollegraf and Lise Gregory won in the final 6–2, 7–6 against Sandy Collins and Leila Meskhi.

== Seeds ==
Champion seeds are indicated in bold text while text in italics indicates the round in which those seeds were eliminated.

1. (United States) Betsy Nagelsen / (France) Catherine Suire (quarterfinals)
2. n/a
3. (Netherlands) **Manon Bollegraf** / (South Africa) **Lise Gregory (champions)**
4. (United States) Ronni Reis / (United States) Paula Smith (semifinals)

== Draw ==
=== Key ===
- Q = Qualifier
- WC = Wild card
- LL = Lucky loser
- Alt = Alternate
- SE = Special exempt
- PR = Protected ranking
- ITF = ITF entry
- JE = Junior exempt
- w/o = Walkover
- r = Retired
- d = Defaulted
- SR = Special ranking

First round
1 | (United States) **B Nagelsen** (France) **C Suire** | **6** | **6**
(Switzerland) E Krapl (West Germany) C Singer | 3 | 2
(United States) **S Collins** (Soviet Union) **L Meskhi** | **6** | **6**
(United States) L Allen (Hong Kong) P Hy | 1 | 4
4 | (United States) **R Reis** (United States) **P Smith** | 4 | **6** | **6**
(Japan) Y Koizumi (Argentina) A Villagrán | **6** | 3 | 1
(Italy) L Ferrando (Peru) P Vásquez | 1 | 4
(France) **S Amiach** (United States) **J Thomas** | **6** | **6**
(United States) M McGrath (United States) S Stafford | 4 | 1
(Netherlands) **C Bakkum** (Netherlands) **H Witvoet** | **6** | **6**
(United States) B Bowes (United States) M Werdel | **7** | 3 | 3
3 | (Netherlands) **M Bollegraf** (South Africa) **L Gregory** | 6 | **6** | **6**
(United States) J Kaplan (Czechoslovakia) D Krajčovičová | 6 | 3
(United States) **H Cioffi** (United States) **A Frazier** | **7** | **6**
(United States) **M Van Nostrand** (United States) **W White** | **6** | **6**
LL | (United States) J Prah (United States) E Rossides | 4 | 3

Quarterfinals
1 | (United States) B Nagelsen (France) C Suire | 2 | **6** | 4
(United States) **S Collins** (Soviet Union) **L Meskhi** | **6** | 4 | **6**
4 | (United States) **R Reis** (United States) **P Smith** | **7** | 3 | **6**
(France) S Amiach (United States) J Thomas | 5 | **6** | 4
(Netherlands) C Bakkum (Netherlands) H Witvoet | 6 | 4
3 | (Netherlands) **M Bollegraf** (South Africa) **L Gregory** | **7** | **6**
(United States) **H Cioffi** (United States) **A Frazier** | **7** | 3 | **6**
LL | (United States) M Van Nostrand (United States) W White | 5 | **6** | 2

Semifinals
(United States) **S Collins** (Soviet Union) **L Meskhi** | **6** | **7**
4 | (United States) R Reis (United States) P Smith | 4 | 5
3 | (Netherlands) **M Bollegraf** (South Africa) **L Gregory** | **7** | **6**
(United States) H Cioffi (United States) A Frazier | 5 | 4

Final
(United States) Sandy Collins (Soviet Union) Leila Meskhi | 2 | 6
3 | (Netherlands) **Manon Bollegraf** (South Africa) **Lise Gregory** | **6** | **7**
