= 1988 Virginia Slims of Kansas – Doubles =

Doubles
- 1988 Virginia Slims of Kansas
- 1987 Champions: (Soviet Union) Svetlana Parkhomenko (Soviet Union) Larisa Savchenko

Final
- Champions: (Soviet Union) Natalia Bykova (Soviet Union) Svetlana Parkhomenko
- Runners-up: (Czechoslovakia) Jana Novotná (France) Catherine Suire
- Score: 6–3, 6–4

Events
Singles	Doubles
← 1987 ·	Virginia Slims of Kansas	· 1989 →

Svetlana Parkhomenko and Larisa Savchenko were the defending champions but only Parkhomenko competed that year with Natalia Bykova.

Bykova and Parkhomenko won in the final 6–3, 6–4 against Jana Novotná and Catherine Suire.

== Seeds ==
Champion seeds are indicated in bold text while text in italics indicates the round in which those seeds were eliminated.

1. (Czechoslovakia) Jana Novotná / (France) Catherine Suire (final)
2. (Soviet Union) **Natalia Bykova** / (Soviet Union) **Svetlana Parkhomenko (champions)**
3. (United States) Anna-Maria Fernandez / (United States) Peanut Harper (first round)
4. (Australia) Dianne Balestrat / (France) Catherine Tanvier (first round)

== Draw ==
=== Key ===
- Q = Qualifier
- WC = Wild card
- LL = Lucky loser
- Alt = Alternate
- SE = Special exempt
- PR = Protected ranking
- ITF = ITF entry
- JE = Junior exempt
- w/o = Walkover
- r = Retired
- d = Defaulted
- SR = Special ranking

First round
1	(Czechoslovakia) **J Novotná** (France) **C Suire**	**7**	**6**
(France) S Amiach (France) E Derly	5	1
(France) **N Herreman** (France) **P Paradis**	**6**	**6**
(Italy) L Ferrando (Spain) M J Llorca	2	3
4	(Australia) D Balestrat (France) C Tanvier	2	2
(Hong Kong) **P Hy** (South Africa) **D van Rensburg**	**6**	**6**
(New Zealand) J Richardson (Austria) H Sprung	4	0
(United States) **H Crowe** (United States) **K Steinmetz**	**6**	**6**
(Czechoslovakia) I Budařová (Brazil) P Medrado	2	4
(New Zealand) **B Cordwell** (United States) **J Kaplan**	**6**	**6**
(United States) **R Casals** (Netherlands) **B Schultz**	2	**7**	**6**
3	(United States) A M Fernandez (United States) P Harper	**6**	6	2
(Czechoslovakia) A Holíková (Netherlands) H Witvoet	**7**	3	2
(Sweden) **M Lindström** (West Germany) **C Porwik**	5	**6**	**6**
(Netherlands) I Driehuis (United States) T Whittington	4	1
2	(Soviet Union) **N Bykova** (Soviet Union) **S Parkhomenko**	**6**	**6**

Quarterfinals
1	(Czechoslovakia) **J Novotná** (France) **C Suire**	**6**	**7**
(France) N Herreman (France) P Paradis	3	5
(Hong Kong) **P Hy** (South Africa) **D van Rensburg**	**6**	**6**
(United States) H Crowe (United States) K Steinmetz	3	4
(New Zealand) **B Cordwell** (United States) **J Kaplan**	**6**	**7**
(United States) R Casals (Netherlands) B Schultz	4	6
(Sweden) M Lindström (West Germany) C Porwik	4	**6**	3
2	(Soviet Union) **N Bykova** (Soviet Union) **S Parkhomenko**	**6**	4	**6**

Semifinals
1	(Czechoslovakia) **J Novotná** (France) **C Suire**	3	**6**	**6**
(Hong Kong) P Hy (South Africa) D van Rensburg	**6**	4	3
(New Zealand) B Cordwell (United States) J Kaplan	**6**	0	4
2	(Soviet Union) **N Bykova** (Soviet Union) **S Parkhomenko**	3	**6**	**6**

Final
1	(Czechoslovakia) Jana Novotná (France) Catherine Suire	3	4
2	(Soviet Union) **Natalia Bykova** (Soviet Union) **Svetlana Parkhomenko**	**6**	**6**
