= 1990 Breyers Tennis Classic =

- Date: February 5–11
- Edition: 10th
- Category: Tier IV
- Draw: 32S / 16D
- Prize money: $150,000
- Surface: Hard / indoor
- Location: Wichita, Kansas, U.S.
- Venue: Crestview Country Club

Champions

Singles
- (South Africa) Dianne Van Rensburg

Doubles
- (Netherlands) Manon Bollegraf / (United States) Meredith McGrath
← 1989 ·	Virginia Slims of Kansas

The 1990 Breyers Tennis Classic was a women's tennis tournament played on indoor hard courts at the Crestview Country Club in Wichita, Kansas in the United States and was part of the Tier IV category of the 1990 WTA Tour. It was the 10th, and last, edition of the tournament and was held from February 5 through February 11, 1990. Unseeded Dianne Van Rensburg won the singles title and earned $27,000 first-prize money.

== Finals ==
=== Singles ===
(South Africa) Dianne Van Rensburg defeated (France) Nathalie Tauziat 2–6, 7–5, 6–2

- It was Van Rensburg's only singles title of her career.

=== Doubles ===
(Netherlands) Manon Bollegraf / (United States) Meredith McGrath defeated (United States) Mary Lou Daniels / (United States) Wendy White 6–0, 6–2

== Prize money ==
Event	W	F	SF	QF	Round of 16	Round of 32
Singles	$27,000	$13,500	$6,750	$3,750	$1,775	$950
