= 1989 Virginia Slims of Kansas – Singles =

Singles
- 1989 Virginia Slims of Kansas
- 1988 Champion: (Bulgaria) Manuela Maleeva

Final
- Champion: (United States) Amy Frazier
- Runner-up: (United States) Barbara Potter
- Score: 4–6, 6–4, 6–0

Details
- Draw: 32
- Seeds: 8

Events
Singles	Doubles
← 1988 ·	Virginia Slims of Kansas	· 1990 →

Manuela Maleeva was the defending champion of the singles title at the 1989 Virginia Slims of Kansas tennis tournament but did not compete that year.

Amy Frazier won in the final 4–6, 6–4, 6–0 against Barbara Potter.

== Seeds ==
A champion seed is indicated in bold text while text in italics indicates the round in which that seed was eliminated.

1. (United States) Barbara Potter (final)
2. (Canada) Helen Kelesi (quarterfinals)
3. (Italy) Raffaella Reggi (second round)
4. (United States) Susan Sloane (semifinals)
5. (Soviet Union) Leila Meskhi (quarterfinals)
6. (United States) **Amy Frazier (champion)**
7. (Australia) Dianne Balestrat (second round)
8. (Japan) Etsuko Inoue (first round)

== Draw ==
=== Key ===
- Q = Qualifier
- WC = Wild card
- LL = Lucky loser
- Alt = Alternate
- SE = Special exempt
- PR = Protected ranking
- ITF = ITF entry
- JE = Junior exempt
- w/o = Walkover
- r = Retired
- d = Defaulted
- SR = Special ranking

First round
1	(United States) **B Potter**	**6**	**6**
(United States) M Torres	4	4
(United States) **H Na**	**6**	**6**
(United States) M Werdel	1	3
(Netherlands) H Witvoet	3	3
(United States) **S Stafford**	**6**	**6**
(United States) B Nagelsen	4	1
5	(Soviet Union) **L Meskhi**	**6**	**6**
4	(United States) **S Sloane**	**6**	**6**
(Switzerland) E Krapl	4	2
(Argentina) A Villagrán	1	3
(Japan) **A Kijimuta**	**6**	**6**
(United States) M Van Nostrand	4	3
(United States) **L Allen**	**6**	**6**
Q	(Japan) N Miyagi	1	4
7	(Australia) **D Balestrat**	**6**	**6**
8	(Japan) E Inoue	2	4
(Netherlands) **M Bollegraf**	**6**	**6**
LL	(France) **C Suire**	**6**	**6**
(United States) B Bowes	4	3
Q	(United States) S Collins	3	1
(United States) **M McGrath**	**6**	**6**
Q	(France) S Amiach	3	1
3	(Italy) **R Reggi**	**6**	**6**
6	(United States) **A Frazier**	2	**6**	**6**
(United States) W White	**6**	1	1
Q	(United States) E Rossides	6	5
LL	(Netherlands) **C Bakkum**	**7**	**7**
(Italy) L Ferrando	4	4
(United States) **R Reis**	**6**	**6**
(United States) C Cunningham	5	4
2	(Canada) **H Kelesi**	**7**	**6**

Second round
1	(United States) **B Potter**	**6**	**6**
(United States) H Na	2	2
(United States) S Stafford	2	2
5	(Soviet Union) **L Meskhi**	**6**	**6**
4	(United States) **S Sloane**	4	**6**	**6**
(Japan) A Kijimuta	**6**	1	1
(United States) **L Allen**	2	**6**	**7**
7	(Australia) D Balestrat	**6**	4	5
(Netherlands) **M Bollegraf**	**7**	2	**6**
LL	(France) C Suire	5	**6**	1
(United States) **M McGrath**	**6**	**6**
3	(Italy) R Reggi	4	2
6	(United States) **A Frazier**	**6**	**6**
LL	(Netherlands) C Bakkum	2	0
(United States) R Reis	5	**6**	3
2	(Canada) **H Kelesi**	**7**	3	**6**

Quarterfinals
1	(United States) **B Potter**	6	**6**	**6**
5	(Soviet Union) L Meskhi	**7**	2	4
4	(United States) **S Sloane**	**6**	**6**
(United States) L Allen	2	3
(Netherlands) M Bollegraf	1	1	r
(United States) **M McGrath**	**6**	**0**
6	(United States) **A Frazier**	**w/o**
2	(Canada) H Kelesi

Semifinals
1	(United States) **B Potter**	**6**	**7**
4	(United States) S Sloane	3	6
(United States) M McGrath	6	2
6	(United States) **A Frazier**	**7**	**6**

Final
1	(United States) Barbara Potter	**6**	4	0
6	(United States) **Amy Frazier**	4	**6**	**6**
