= 1988 Virginia Slims of Kansas =

- Date: February 29 – March 6
- Edition: 8th
- Category: Category 2
- Draw: 32S / 16D
- Prize money: $100,000
- Surface: Hard / indoor
- Location: Wichita, Kansas, U.S.
- Venue: Kansas Coliseum

Champions

Singles
- (Bulgaria) Manuela Maleeva

Doubles
- (Soviet Union) Natalia Bykova (Soviet Union) Svetlana Parkhomenko
| ← 1987 · | Virginia Slims of Kansas | · 1989 → |

The 1988 Virginia Slims of Kansas was a women's tennis tournament played on indoor hard courts at the Kansas Coliseum in Wichita, Kansas in the United States and was part of the Category 2 tier of the 1988 WTA Tour. It was the eighth edition of the tournament and ran from February 29 through March 6, 1988. First-seeded Manuela Maleeva won the singles title.

== Finals ==
=== Singles ===
(Bulgaria) Manuela Maleeva defeated (West Germany) Sylvia Hanika 7–6^{(7–5)}, 7–5

- It was Maleeva's 1st singles title of the year and the 9th of her career.

=== Doubles ===
(Soviet Union) Natalia Bykova / (Soviet Union) Svetlana Parkhomenko defeated (Czechoslovakia) Jana Novotná / (France) Catherine Suire 6–3, 6–4

- It was Bykova's 1st title of the year and the 1st of her career. It was Parkhomenko's only title of the year and the 8th of her career.
