= 1990 Breyers Tennis Classic – Singles =

Singles
- 1990 Breyers Tennis Classic

Final
- Champion: (South Africa) Dianne Van Rensburg
- Runner-up: (France) Nathalie Tauziat
- Score: 2–6, 7–5, 6–2

Details
- Draw: 32 (1WC/4Q)
- Seeds: 8

Events
Singles	Doubles
← 1989 ·	Virginia Slims of Kansas

Amy Frazier was the defending champion, but lost in the quarterfinals to Susan Sloane.

Dianne Van Rensburg won the title by defeating Nathalie Tauziat 2–6, 7–5, 6–2 in the final.

== Seeds ==
1. (France) Nathalie Tauziat (final)
2. (United States) Amy Frazier (quarterfinals)
3. (United States) Gretchen Magers (second round)
4. (West Germany) Isabel Cueto (second round)
5. (Australia) Anne Minter (quarterfinals)
6. (United States) Susan Sloane (semifinals)
7. (Netherlands) Manon Bollegraf (quarterfinals)
8. (United States) Anne Smith (first round)

== Draw ==
=== Key ===
- Q = Qualifier
- WC = Wild card
- LL = Lucky loser
- Alt = Alternate
- SE = Special exempt
- PR = Protected ranking
- ITF = ITF entry
- JE = Junior exempt
- w/o = Walkover
- r = Retired
- d = Defaulted
- SR = Special ranking

=== Finals ===
Semifinals
1	(France) Nathalie Tauziat	6	6
(United States) Peanut Louie Harper	3	2
(South Africa) Dianne Van Rensburg	6	7^{12}
6	(United States) Susan Sloane	2	6^{10}

Final
1	(France) Nathalie Tauziat	6	5	2
(South Africa) Dianne Van Rensburg	2	7	6

=== Top half ===
First round
1	(France) N Tauziat	6	4	7
(United States) M McGrath	3	6	5
(United States) W White	1	3
(Italy) L Ferrando	6	6
(United States) E Burgin	3	7^{8}	7^{7}
(United States) L Allen	6	6^{6}	6^{2}
(United Kingdom) M Javer	2	0
7	(Netherlands) M Bollegraf	6	6
4	(West Germany) I Cueto	4	6	7^{7}
(Canada) R Simpson	6	3	6^{4}
(United States) P Louie Harper	6	6
(United States) H Cioffi	1	3
(United States) A Henricksson	6	6
(United States) A Grossman	0	3
Q	(United States) J Santrock	6^{5}	1
5	(Australia) A Minter	7^{7}	6

Second round
1	(France) N Tauziat	1	6	6
(Italy) L Ferrando	6	3	4
(United States) E Burgin	4	4
7	(Netherlands) M Bollegraf	6	6
4	(West Germany) I Cueto	4	6^{3}
(United States) P Louie Harper	6	7^{7}
(United States) A Henricksson	3	5
5	(Australia) A Minter	6	7

Quarterfinals
1	(France) N Tauziat	6	6
7	(Netherlands) M Bollegraf	1	2
(United States) P Louie Harper	6	6
5	(Australia) A Minter	3	3

Semifinals
1	(France) N Tauziat	6	6
(United States) P Louie Harper	3	2

=== Bottom half ===
First round
8	(United States) A Smith	7^{7}	6^{5}	5
(United States) M Werdel	6^{3}	7^{7}	7
(South Africa) D Van Rensburg	7^{7}	7
WC	(United States) A White	6^{2}	5
(United States) ML Daniels	6	6
(Brazil) A Vieira	1	2
(Poland) R Baranski	4	1
3	(United States) G Magers	6	6
6	(United States) S Sloane	6	6
Q	(Netherlands) C Vis	1	1
(United States) H Na	6	6
Q	(South Africa) L Gregory	1	2
Q	(United States) A Keller	2	5
(United States) S Martin	6	7
(Australia) N Provis	2	6	6^{0}
2	(United States) A Frazier	6	3	7^{7}

Second round
(United States) M Werdel	6	3	4
(South Africa) D Van Rensburg	3	6	6
(United States) ML Daniels	6	6
3	(United States) G Magers	2	2
6	(United States) S Sloane	6	6
(United States) H Na	4	0
(United States) S Martin	4	2
2	(United States) A Frazier	6	6

Quarterfinals
(South Africa) D Van Rensburg	6	4	6
(United States) ML Daniels	1	6	2
6	(United States) S Sloane	7	3	6
2	(United States) A Frazier	5	6	3

Semifinals
(South Africa) D Van Rensburg	6	7^{12}
6	(United States) S Sloane	2	6^{10}
