= 1990 Breyers Tennis Classic – Doubles =

Doubles
- 1990 Breyers Tennis Classic

Final
- Champions: (Netherlands) Manon Bollegraf (United States) Meredith McGrath
- Runners-up: (United States) Mary Lou Daniels (United States) Wendy White
- Score: 6–0, 6–2

Details
- Draw: 16 (1WC/1Q)
- Seeds: 4

Events
Singles	Doubles
← 1989 ·	Virginia Slims of Kansas

Manon Bollegraf and Lise Gregory were the defending champions, but both players chose to compete with different partners.

Gregory teamed up with Gretchen Magers and lost in the semifinals to Mary Lou Daniels and Wendy White.

Bollegraf teamed up with Meredith McGrath and successfully defended her title, by defeating Daniels and White 6–0, 6–2 in the final.

== Seeds ==
1. (Netherlands) Manon Bollegraf / (United States) Meredith McGrath (champions)
2. (South Africa) Lise Gregory / (United States) Gretchen Magers (semifinals)
3. (United States) Mary Lou Daniels / (United States) Wendy White (final)
4. (United States) Penny Barg / (United States) Peanut Louie Harper (quarterfinals)

== Draw ==
=== Key ===
- Q = Qualifier
- WC = Wild card
- LL = Lucky loser
- Alt = Alternate
- SE = Special exempt
- PR = Protected ranking
- ITF = ITF entry
- JE = Junior exempt
- w/o = Walkover
- r = Retired
- d = Defaulted
- SR = Special ranking

=== Draw ===
First round
1	(Netherlands) M Bollegraf (United States) M McGrath	6	6
(United States) H Na (France) N Tauziat	4	3
(United States) H Cioffi (United States) A Frazier	4	6	2
(United States) A Henricksson (United States) A Smith	6	4	6
4	(United States) P Barg (United States) P Louie Harper	6	7
(United States) K Foxworth (United States) T Whittington	3	5
WC	(Australia) N Provis (United States) A White	6	6
Q	(United States) L Bartlett (United States) S Bartlett	1	3
(Canada) R Simpson (United States) M Werdel	6	4	6
(Netherlands) H ter Riet (Brazil) A Vieira	4	6	2
(United States) A Cooper (United States) M Norwood	3	0
3	(United States) ML Daniels (United States) W White	6	6
(Denmark) S Albinus (France) N van Lottum	4	6	3
(Australia) A Minter (Netherlands) C Vis	6	1	6
(United States) L Allen (South Africa) D Van Rensburg	2	4
2	(South Africa) L Gregory (United States) G Magers	6	6

Quarterfinals
1	(Netherlands) M Bollegraf (United States) M McGrath	7^{7}	7^{7}
(United States) A Henricksson (United States) A Smith	6^{5}	6^{4}
4	(United States) P Barg (United States) P Louie Harper	6	2	3
WC	(Australia) N Provis (United States) A White	4	6	6
(Canada) R Simpson (United States) M Werdel	4	1
3	(United States) ML Daniels (United States) W White	6	6
(Australia) A Minter (Netherlands) C Vis	3	3
2	(South Africa) L Gregory (United States) G Magers	6	6

Semifinals
1	(Netherlands) M Bollegraf (United States) M McGrath	7	7^{7}
WC	(Australia) N Provis (United States) A White	5	6^{3}
3	(United States) ML Daniels (United States) W White	7	7
2	(South Africa) L Gregory (United States) G Magers	5	5

Final
1	(Netherlands) M Bollegraf (United States) M McGrath	6	6
3	(United States) ML Daniels (United States) W White	0	2
