= 1989 Virginia Slims of Kansas =

- Date: February 20–26
- Edition: 9th
- Category: Category 2
- Draw: 32S / 16D
- Prize money: $100,000
- Surface: Hard / indoor
- Location: Wichita, Kansas, U.S.
- Venue: Crestview Country Club

Champions

Singles
- (United States) Amy Frazier

Doubles
- (Netherlands) Manon Bollegraf / (South Africa) Lise Gregory
← 1988 ·	Virginia Slims of Kansas	· 1990 →

The 1989 Virginia Slims of Kansas was a women's tennis tournament played on indoor hard courts at the Crestview Country Club in Wichita, Kansas in the United States and was part of the Category 2 tier of the 1989 WTA Tour. The tournament ran from February 20 through February 26, 1989. Sixth-seeded Amy Frazier won the singles title and earned $17,000 first-prize money.

== Finals ==
=== Singles ===
(United States) Amy Frazier defeated (United States) Barbara Potter 4–6, 6–4, 6–0

- It was Frazier's only title of the year and the 1st of her career.

=== Doubles ===
(Netherlands) Manon Bollegraf / (South Africa) Lise Gregory defeated (United States) Sandy Collins / (Soviet Union) Leila Meskhi 6–2, 7–6^{(7–5)}

- It was Bollegraf's 1st title of the year and the 2nd of her career. It was Gregory's only title of the year and the 3rd of her career.

== Prize money ==
Event	W	F	SF	QF	Round of 16	Round of 32
Singles	$17,000	$8,500	$4,250	$2,125	$1,175	$750
