= Virginia Slims of Arkansas =

Defunct tennis tournament
- Event name: Virginia Slims of Arkansas
- Tour: WTA Tour
- Founded: 1986
- Abolished: 1987
- Editions: 2
- Surface: Carpet / indoors (1986); Hard / outdoors (1987)

The Virginia Slims of Arkansas is a defunct WTA Tour affiliated tennis tournament played from 1986 to 1987. It was held in Little Rock, Arkansas in the United States and played on indoor carpet courts in 1986 and on outdoor hard courts in 1987.

== Past finals ==
=== Singles ===
Year	Champions	Runners-up	Score
1986	(United States) Kathy Rinaldi	(Soviet Union) Natalia Zvereva	6–4, 6–7^{(7–9)}, 6–0
1987	(Italy) Sandra Cecchini	(Soviet Union) Natalia Zvereva	0–6, 6–1, 6–3

=== Doubles ===
Year	Champions	Runners-up	Score
1986	(Soviet Union) Svetlana Parkhomenko (Soviet Union) Larisa Savchenko	(Czechoslovakia) Iva Budařová (United States) Beth Herr	6–2, 1–6, 6–1
1987	(United States) Mary Lou Daniels (United States) Robin White	(United States) Lea Antonoplis (United States) Barbara Gerken	6–2, 6–4
