= 1990 Austrian Ladies Open =

- Date: 10–16 September
- Edition: 18th
- Category: Tier V
- Draw: 32S / 16D
- Prize money: $100,000
- Surface: Clay / outdoor
- Location: Kitzbühel, Austria

Champions

Singles
- (Germany) Claudia Kohde-Kilsch

Doubles
- (Czechoslovakia) Petra Langrová / (Czechoslovakia) Radka Zrubáková
- WTA Austrian Open

The 1990 Austrian Ladies Open was a women's tennis tournament played on outdoor clay courts in Kitzbühel, Austria that was part of the Tier V category of the 1990 WTA Tour. It was the 18th edition of the tournament and was held from 10 September until 16 September 1990. Eighth-seeded Claudia Kohde-Kilsch won the singles title.

== Finals ==
=== Singles ===
(Germany) Claudia Kohde-Kilsch defeated (Australia) Rachel McQuillan 7–6^{(7–5)}, 6–4

- It was Kohde-Kilsch's only singles title of the year and the 8th and last of her career.

=== Doubles ===
(Czechoslovakia) Petra Langrová / (Czechoslovakia) Radka Zrubáková defeated (Italy) Sandra Cecchini / (Argentina) Patricia Tarabini 6–0, 6–4

- It was Langrová's only doubles title of the year and the 1st of her career. It was Zrubáková's only doubles title of the year and the 1st of her career.
