= Hester Witvoet =

Dutch tennis player

- Country (sports): Netherlands
- Born: 7 July 1967 (age 57)
- Plays: Left-handed
- Prize money: $60,269

Singles
- Career record: 52–38
- Career titles: 3 ITF
- Highest ranking: No. 64 (2 January 1989)

Grand Slam singles results
- Australian Open: 1R (1989)
- French Open: 2R (1988)
- Wimbledon: 2R (1988)

Doubles
- Career record: 28–30
- Career titles: 3 ITF
- Highest ranking: No. 91 (21 November 1988)

Grand Slam doubles results
- Australian Open: 1R (1989)
- French Open: 1R (1988)
- Wimbledon: 2R (1988, 1989)

Hester Witvoet (born 7 July 1967) is a Dutch former professional tennis player.

A left-handed player from Driebergen, Witvoet competed on the professional tour in the late 1980s. She reached a best singles ranking of 64 in the world and featured in the main draws of the Australian Open, French Open and Wimbledon during her career. In 1988 she had her best year on the WTA Tour, making the quarterfinals at the New South Wales Open and semifinals at the Virginia Slims of Kansas.

== ITF finals ==
=== Singles (3–1) ===
Result	No.	Date	Tournament	Surface	Opponent	Score
Win	1.	6 April 1987	Arad, Israel	Hard	(Israel) Ilana Berger	6–2, 6–1
Loss	1.	31 May 1987	Bad Gastein, Austria	Clay	(Austria) Petra Schwarz	6–2, 6–7, 1–6
Win	2.	27 September 1987	Šibenik, Yugoslavia	Clay	(Sweden) Jonna Jonerup	6–3, 6–0
Win	3.	5 October 1987	Rabac, Yugoslavia	Clay	(Czechoslovakia) Leona Lásková	6–3, 6–2

=== Doubles (3–1) ===
Result	No.	Date	Tournament	Surface	Partner	Opponents	Score
Loss	1.	30 March 1987	Arad, Israel	Hard	(Netherlands) Titia Wilmink	(Israel) Ilana Berger (Israel) Yael Shavit	3–6, 2–6
Win	1.	7 April 1987	Haifa, Israel	Hard	(Netherlands) Titia Wilmink	(West Germany) Christine Hein (West Germany) Evelyn Larwig	6–1, 7–6
Win	2.	31 May 1987	Bad Gastein, Austria	Clay	(Netherlands) Yvonne der Kinderen	(Hungary) Katalin Darvas (Hungary) Rita Kowacsics	6–2, 6–0
Win	3.	21 September 1987	Šibenik, Yugoslavia	Clay	(Netherlands) Yvonne der Kinderen	(Sweden) Jonna Jonerup (Sweden) Maria Strandlund	6–3, 6–3
