= Mary Lou Piatek-Daniels =

American tennis player

- Country (sports): United States
- Residence: Munster, Indiana, U.S.
- Born: August 6, 1961 (age 65) Whiting, Indiana, U.S.
- Height: 5 ft 6 in (1.68 m)
- Turned pro: October 1, 1980
- Plays: Right-handed
- Prize money: US$711,131

Singles
- Career record: 152–214
- Career titles: 2
- Highest ranking: No. 15 (March,1982)

Doubles
- Career record: 233–214
- Career titles: 7
- Highest ranking: No. 24 (September 24, 1990)

Mary Lou Piatek-Daniels (born August 6, 1961) is a retired tennis player from the U.S. who played on the WTA Tour during the 1980s.

In 1979, she was the no. 1 junior in the world. She won her first pro title at Richmond, Virginia 1981, beating Sylvia Hanika and Sue Barker en route. She was coached by her father Joseph, a former varsity player at Indiana University, and by Trinity coach Emilie Foster.

Piatek-Daniels made her ranking debut in February 1980 at no. 45. Her career wins include Robin White, Christiane Jolissaint, Kathy Horvath, Wendy White, Gigi Fernández, and Betsy Nagelsen.

== WTA Tour finals ==
=== Singles 4 (2–2) ===
Legend
Grand Slam	0
WTA Championships	0
Tier I	0
Tier II	0
Tier III	0
Tier IV & V	0

Result	W/L	Date	Tournament	Surface	Opponent	Score
Loss	0–1	Jul 1980	Richmond, Virginia, US	Carpet	(United States) Martina Navratilova	3–6, 0–6
Win	1–1	Aug 1981	Richmond, Virginia, US	Carpet	(United Kingdom) Sue Barker	6–4, 6–1
Loss	1–2	Sep 1981	Atlanta, Georgia, US	Carpet	(United States) Tracy Austin	6–4, 3–6, 3–6
Win	2–2	Jan 1984	Denver, Colorado, US	Hard	(United States) Kim Sands	6–1, 6–1

=== Doubles 21 (7–14) ===
Legend
Grand Slam	0
WTA Championships	0
Tier I	0
Tier II	0
Tier III	0
Tier IV & V	1

Titles by surface
Hard	4
Clay	1
Grass	0
Carpet	2

Result	W/L	Date	Tournament	Surface	Partner	Opponents	Score
Loss	1.	Dec 1980	Tucson, Arizona, US	Carpet	(United States) Wendy White	(United States) Leslie Allen (United States) Barbara Potter	6–7, 0–6
Loss	2.	Feb 1981	Houston, Texas, US	Carpet	(Czechoslovakia) Regina Maršíková	(United Kingdom) Sue Barker (United States) Ann Kiyomura	7–5, 4–6, 3–6
Win	3.	Oct 1981	Deerfield Beach, Florida, US	Hard	(United States) Wendy White	(United States) Pam Shriver (United States) Paula Smith	6–1, 3–6, 7–5
Loss	4.	Feb 1982	Kansas City, Missouri, US	Carpet	(United States) Anne Smith	(United States) Barbara Potter (United States) Sharon Walsh	6–4, 2–6, 2–6
Loss	5.	Oct 1982	Tampa, Florida, US	Hard	(United States) Wendy White	(United States) Ann Kiyomura (United States) Paula Smith	2–6, 4–6
Win	6.	Jan 1983	Marco Island, Florida, US	Clay	(United States) Andrea Jaeger	(United States) Rosie Casals (Australia) Wendy Turnbull	7–5, 6–4
Loss	7.	Nov 1983	Deerfield Beach, Florida, US	Hard	(United States) Pam Casale	(United States) Bonnie Gadusek (United States) Wendy White	1–6, 6–3, 3–6
Loss	8.	Jan 1984	Nashville, Tennessee, US	Hard	(United States) Paula Smith	(United States) Sherry Acker (United States) Candy Reynolds	7–5, 6–7, 6–7
Loss	9.	Mar 1984	Boston, Massachusetts, US	Carpet	(United States) Andrea Leand	(United States) Barbara Potter (United States) Sharon Walsh	6–7, 0–6
Loss	10.	Oct 1984	Tarpon Springs, Florida, US	Hard	(United States) Wendy White	(Canada) Carling Bassett (Australia) Liz Smylie	4–6, 3–6
Win	11.	Jan 1985	Denver, Colorado, US	Carpet	(United States) Robin White	(United States) Leslie Allen (United States) Sharon Walsh	1–6, 6–4, 7–5
Loss	12.	Sep 1985	New Orleans, Louisiana, US	Carpet	(United States) Anne White	(United States) Chris Evert-Lloyd (Australia) Wendy Turnbull	1–6, 2–6
Win	13.	Oct 1985	Indianapolis, Indiana, US	Hard	(United States) Bonnie Gadusek	(United States) Penny Barg (United States) Sandy Collins	6–1, 6–0
Loss	14.	Mar 1987	Phoenix, Arizona, US	Hard	(United States) Anne White	(United States) Penny Barg (United States) Beth Herr	6–2, 2–6, 6–7^{(2–7)}
Win	15.	Mar 1987	Dallas, Texas, US	Carpet	(United States) Anne White	(United States) Elise Burgin (United States) Robin White	7–5, 6–3
Win	16.	Nov 1987	Little Rock, Arkansas, US	Hard	(United States) Robin White	(United States) Lea Antonoplis (United States) Barbara Gerken	6–2, 6–4
Loss	17.	Apr 1989	Hilton Head, South Carolina, US	Clay	(United States) Wendy White	(Australia) Hana Mandlíková (United States) Martina Navratilova	4–6, 1–6
Loss	18.	Feb 1990	Wichita, Kansas, US	Clay	(United States) Wendy White	(Netherlands) Manon Bollegraf (United States) Meredith McGrath	0–6, 2–6
Win	19.	Feb 1990	Oklahoma City, Oklahoma, US	Hard	(United States) Wendy White	(Netherlands) Manon Bollegraf (South Africa) Lise Gregory	7–5, 6–2
Loss	20.	Apr 1991	Hilton Head, South Carolina, US	Clay	(South Africa) Lise Gregory	(West Germany) Claudia Kohde-Kilsch (Soviet Union) Natalia Zvereva	4–6, 0–6
Loss	21.	Nov 1991	Indianapolis, Indiana, US	Hard	(United States) Sandy Collins	(United States) Katrina Adams (South Africa) Elna Reinach	7–5, 2–6, 4–6
