= Svetlana Parkhomenko =

Soviet-Russian tennis player and tennis coach

- Full name: Svetlana Germanovna Parkhomenko
- Country (sports): Soviet Union; Russia
- Born: 8 October 1962 (age 63) Moscow, USSR
- Height: 1.62 m (5 ft 4 in)
- Retired: 1995
- Plays: Right-handed (two-handed backhand)
- Prize money: $208,184

Singles
- Career record: 124–93
- Career titles: 3 ITF
- Highest ranking: No. 72 (30 January 1989)

Grand Slam singles results
- Australian Open: 2R (1984)
- French Open: 1R (1986)
- Wimbledon: 3R (1984)
- US Open: 1R (1987)

Doubles
- Career record: 209–79
- Career titles: 8 WTA, 17 ITF
- Highest ranking: No. 8 (18 January 1988)

Grand Slam doubles results
- Australian Open: 2R (1984)
- French Open: QF (1986)
- Wimbledon: SF (1987)
- US Open: 3R (1987)

Other doubles tournaments
- Tour Finals: SF (1986)
Medal record
Women's tennis
Representing Soviet Union
Universiade
Bronze medal – third place	1983 Edmonton	Women's doubles
Bronze medal – third place	1983 Edmonton	Mixed doubles
Friendship Games
Bronze medal – third place	1984	Women's doubles

Svetlana Germanovna Parkhomenko (Russian: Светлана Германовна Пархоменко, née Cherneva, Чернева; born October 8, 1962) is a retired Soviet and Russian tennis player and tennis coach. She was the winner of the Soviet singles tennis championships in 1985 and nine times Soviet champion in women's doubles and mixed doubles. On the international level, she was the winner of the 1983 European amateur championships in women's and mixed doubles, bronze medalist of the 1983 Universiade in women's and mixed doubles, and winner of eight WTA Tour doubles tournaments.

Parkhomenko also was the recipient of 1988 WTA Sportsmanship Award.

== Biography ==
In 1978, Svetlana won the singles and doubles title at European Junior Championships (she also won doubles titles in the next two years). In 1978, she also won the Soviet youth championships in singles, girls' and mixed doubles, and in 1980 in singles and girls' doubles. In 1980, she advanced with the Soviet girls team to the finals of Princess Sofia Cup.

Starting in 1981, Svetlana (from 1984 playing under her married name Parkhomenko) won the senior Soviet doubles championships eight times (twice in 1987). In addition, she became the singles champion in 1985 and mixed doubles champion in 1983. From 1981, she also played for the Soviet Union Federation Cup team. In total, between 1981 and 1988, she played 28 rubbers for the Soviet team, mostly in doubles with Larisa Savchenko.

In 1983, Cherneva won the European amateur championships in women's and mixed doubles and took bronze in the same disciplines at the 1983 Summer Universiade. From the same year, she started playing in international professional tennis tournaments. In 1984, she won her first ITF titles in San Antonio and Delray Beach, and at the Wimbledon Championships advanced with Savchenko to the quarterfinals, after defeating third seed Kathy Horvath and Virginia Ruzici, as well as Chris Evert and Catherine Tanvier. In the next three years, Parkhomenko and Savchenko won seven Virginia Slims tournaments including four in 1987. They played three times in a row at the Virginia Slims Championships, and in March 1986 advanced there to semifinals. In 1987, they reached semifinals at Wimbledon, after defeating the world's best pair, recent Grand Slam winners Martina Navratilova and Pam Shriver, breaking their 53-match winning streak.

At the start of 1988 season, Parkhomenko was ranked as high as eighth in the WTA doubles rankings. But in 1988, Savchenko broke with her to play doubles with young Natasha Zvereva. Without Savchenko, Parkhomenko struggled to retain her best form, playing with other partners. She won one WTA tournament with Natalia Bykova and twice reached finals with Leila Meskhi, and at the end of the season, she received the WTA Sportsmanship Award.

After completely missing the 1989 season, Parkhomenko returned to play at the end 1990. In 1991, she was awarded the title of Honoured Master of Sports. In 1992, she returned to the top 10 of the Russian tennis and remained there for two more years. In 1993, she played three ties for the Russia Fed Cup team, winning her doubles games against Ukrainians and Lithuanians. After finishing her playing career in 1995, she coaches at the Moscow CSKA tennis club.

== Virginia Slims and WTA career finals ==
=== Doubles: 14 (8 titles, 6 runner-ups) ===
Legend
Grand Slam (0)
Tier IV-V (1)
Virginia Slims/VS (7)

Result	W/L	Date	Tournament	Surface	Partner	Opponents	Score
Loss	0–1	Jan 1985	Key Biscayne, U.S.	Hard	(Soviet Union) Larisa Savchenko	(United States) Kathy Jordan (Australia) Elizabeth Smylie	4–6, 6–7
Loss	0–2	Apr 1985	Hilton Head, U.S.	Clay	(Soviet Union) Larisa Savchenko	(South Africa) Rosalyn Fairbank (United States) Pam Shriver	4–6, 1–6
Win	1–2	Apr 1985	Seabrook Island, U.S.	Clay	(Soviet Union) Larisa Savchenko	(United States) Elise Burgin (United States) Lori McNeil	6–1, 6–3
Win	2–2	Sep 1985	Salt Lake City, U.S.	Hard	(Soviet Union) Larisa Savchenko	(South Africa) Beverly Mould (South Africa) Rosalyn Fairbank	7–5, 6–2
Loss	2–3	Sep 1986	Tulsa, U.S.	Hard	(Soviet Union) Larisa Savchenko	(United States) Camille Benjamin (South Africa) Dinky Van Rensburg	6–7, 5–7
Loss	2–4	Sep 1986	New Orleans, U.S.	Hard	(Soviet Union) Larisa Savchenko	(United States) Candy Reynolds (United States) Anne Smith	3–6, 6–3, 3–6
Win	3–4	Nov 1986	Little Rock, U.S.	Carpet (i)	(Soviet Union) Larisa Savchenko	(Czechoslovakia) Iva Budařová (United States) Beth Herr	6–2, 1–6, 6–1
Win	4–4	Jan 1987	Wichita, U.S.	Carpet (i)	(Soviet Union) Larisa Savchenko	(United States) Barbara Potter (United States) Wendy White	6–2, 6–4
Win	5–4	Feb 1987	Oklahoma City, U.S.	Hard	(Soviet Union) Larisa Savchenko	(United States) Lori McNeil (United States) Kim Sands	6–4, 6–4
Win	6–4	Feb 1987	Boca Raton, U.S.	Hard	(Soviet Union) Larisa Savchenko	(United States) Chris Evert (United States) Pam Shriver	6–0, 3–6, 6–2
Win	7–4	Jun 1987	Eastbourne, UK	Grass	(Soviet Union) Larisa Savchenko	(South Africa) Rosalyn Fairbank (Australia) Elizabeth Smylie	7–6^{(7–5)}, 4–6, 7–5
Win	8–4	Feb 1988	Wichita, U.S.	Hard (i)	(Soviet Union) Natalia Bykova	(Czechoslovakia) Jana Novotná (France) Catherine Suire	6–3, 6–4
Loss	8–5	Apr 1988	Singapore	Hard	(Soviet Union) Leila Meskhi	(Soviet Union) Natalia Bykova (Soviet Union) Natalia Medvedeva	6–7, 3–6
Loss	8–6	Jun 1988	Birmingham, UK	Grass	(Soviet Union) Leila Meskhi	(Soviet Union) Larisa Savchenko (Soviet Union) Natasha Zvereva	4–6, 1–6

== ITF finals ==
$100,000 tournaments
$75,000 tournaments
$50,000 tournaments
$25,000 tournaments
$10,000 tournaments

=== Singles: 8 (3–5) ===
Result	No.	Date	Tournament	Surface	Opponent	Score
Loss	1.	16 January 1984	ITF Delray Beach, United States	Hard	(United States) Anna Ivan	3–6, 3–6
Win	2.	27 April 1992	ITF Sheffield, UK	Hard	(Australia) Angie Woolcock	6–3, 4–6, 6–4
Loss	3.	19 October 1992	ITF Moscow, Russia	Clay	(Commonwealth of Independent States) Elena Makarova	5–7, 2–6
Loss	4.	8 February 1993	ITF Sunderland, UK	Carpet (i)	(Netherlands) Gaby Coorengel	6–3, 6–7^{(3–7)}, 3–6
Loss	5.	3 May 1993	ITF Bracknell, UK	Hard	(Sweden) Marianne Vallin	7–6^{(7–3)}, 3–6, 1–6
Win	6.	27 September 1993	ITF Bracknell, UK	Hard	(United Kingdom) Julie Pullin	7–5, 6–2
Win	7.	4 October 1993	ITF Basingstoke, UK	Hard (i)	(United Kingdom) Emily Bond	2–6, 6–3, 6–0
Loss	8.	8 November 1993	ITF Swindon, UK	Carpet (i)	(United Kingdom) Emily Bond	5–7, 3–6

=== Doubles: 23 (17–6) ===
Result	No.	Date	Tournament	Surface	Partner	Opponents	Score
Loss	1.	31 June 1982	ITF Fayetteville, United States	Hard	(Soviet Union) Elena Eliseenko	(United States) Pam Whytcross (United States) Emily Newton	4–6, 6–1, 6–7
Loss	2.	2 January 1984	ITF Chicago, United States	Hard (i)	(Soviet Union) Larisa Neiland	(Switzerland) Csilla Bartos-Cserepy (Netherlands) Marianne van der Torre	w/o
Win	3.	9 January 1984	ITF San Antonio, United States	Hard	(Soviet Union) Elena Eliseenko	(United States) Carol Christian (United States) Jaime Kaplan	6–1, 6–1
Win	4.	16 January 1984	ITF Delray Beach, United States	Hard	(United States) Jaime Kaplan	(United States) Carol Christian (United States) Jamie Golder	6–3, 6–1
Loss	5.	23 March 1992	ITF Santander, Spain	Clay	(United Kingdom) Amanda Evans	(Poland) Agata Werblińska (Poland) Katarzyna Teodorowicz	3–6, 3–6
Loss	6.	27 April 1992	ITF Sheffield, UK	Clay	(United Kingdom) Amanda Evans	(Australia) Lisa McShea (United States) Amy deLone	4–6, 1–6
Win	7.	11 May 1992	ITF Bournemouth, UK	Hard	(United Kingdom) Amanda Evans	(United States) Amy deLone (United Kingdom) Tamsin Wainwright	6–3, 2–6, 6–4
Win	8.	19 October 1992	ITF Moscow, Russia	Hard (i)	(Commonwealth of Independent States) Natalia Egorova	(Commonwealth of Independent States) Elena Likhovtseva (Commonwealth of Independent States) Julia Lutrova	6–4, 4–6, 6–4
Win	9.	1 February 1993	ITF Newcastle, UK	Carpet (i)	(Russia) Natalia Egorova	(Czech Republic) Pavlína Rajzlová (Czech Republic) Helena Vildová	6–4, 4–6, 6–0
Win	10.	8 February 1993	ITF Sunderland, UK	Carpet (i)	(Russia) Natalia Egorova	(Czech Republic) Pavlína Rajzlová (Czech Republic) Helena Vildová	2–6, 6–1, 7–6^{(7–5)}
Win	11.	19 April 1993	ITF Nottingham, UK	Hard	(Russia) Natalia Egorova	(United Kingdom) Julie Salmon (United Kingdom) Lorna Woodroffe	5–1 ret.
Win	12.	3 May 1993	ITF Bracknell, UK	Hard	(Russia) Natalia Egorova	(United Kingdom) Claire Taylor (United Kingdom) Lorna Woodroffe	7–6, 6–1
Win	13.	12 July 1993	ITF Frinton-on-Sea, UK	Grass	(Russia) Natalia Egorova	(Australia) Maija Avotins (Australia) Lisa McShea	4–6, 6–2, 7–6^{(7–5)}
Loss	14.	20 September 1993	ITF Sheffield, UK	Hard	(Russia) Natalia Egorova	(United Kingdom) Caroline Hunt (United Kingdom) Shirli-Ann Siddall	4–6, 5–7
Win	15.	4 October 1993	ITF Basingstoke, UK	Hard (i)	(Russia) Natalia Egorova	(Netherlands) Caroline Stassen (United Kingdom) Lorna Woodroffe	6–2, 6–1
Win	16.	8 November 1993	ITF Swindon, UK	Carpet (i)	(Russia) Natalia Egorova	(United Kingdom) Alison Smith (Netherlands) Caroline Stassen	6–0, 6–4
Win	17.	15 November 1993	ITF Swansea, UK	Hard (i)	(Russia) Natalia Egorova	(United Kingdom) Alison Smith (Netherlands) Caroline Stassen	6–1, 6–3
Win	18.	29 November 1993	ITF Ramat HaSharon, Israel	Hard	(Russia) Natalia Egorova	(Germany) Angela Kerek (Ukraine) Olga Lugina	6–2, 6–3
Win	19.	4 July 1994	ITF Felixstowe, UK	Grass	(Russia) Natalia Egorova	(Netherlands) Caroline Stassen (United Kingdom) Lorna Woodroffe	6–3, 7–5
Loss	20.	11 July 1994	ITF Frinton-on-Sea, UK	Grass	(Russia) Natalia Egorova	(United Kingdom) Helen Crook (United Kingdom) Victoria Davies	3–6, 2–6
Win	21.	14 November 1994	ITF Eastbourne, UK	Carpet (i)	(Russia) Natalia Egorova	(United Kingdom) Shirli-Ann Siddall (United Kingdom) Amanda Wainwright	7–6^{(10–8)}, 7–6^{(8–6)}
Win	22.	6 February 1995	ITF Sheffield, UK	Hard (i)	(Russia) Natalia Egorova	(United Kingdom) Amanda Wainwright (United Kingdom) Lorna Woodroffe	6–4, 6–2
Win	23.	13 February 1995	ITF Sunderland, UK	Hard (i)	(Russia) Natalia Egorova	(United Kingdom) Michele Mair (Republic of Ireland) Karen Nugent	7–5, 6–0

== Other finals ==
=== Singles (1–1) ===
Outcome	No.	Year	Tournament	Location	Opponent	Score
Runner-up	1.	1983	USSR Tennis National Championship	Jūrmala, Latvian SSR	(Soviet Union) Elena Eliseenko	4–6, 5–7
Winner	2.	1985	USSR Tennis National Championship	Tbilisi, Georgian SSR	(Soviet Union) Julia Salnikova	6–7, 6–4, 6–2

=== Doubles (8–2) ===
Outcome	No.	Year	Tournament	Location	Partner	Opponents	Score
Winner	1.	1981	USSR Tennis National Championship	Moscow, Russian SFSR	(Soviet Union) Olga Zaitseva	(Soviet Union) Natasha Chmyreva (Soviet Union) Marina Kroschina	6–1, 6–1
Winner	2.	1982	USSR Tennis National Championship	Kharkiv, Ukrainian SSR	(Soviet Union) Yuliya Kasheverova	(Soviet Union) Olga Avdeeva (Soviet Union) Elena Eliseenko	6–2, 6–2
Winner	3.	1983	USSR Tennis National Championship	Jūrmala, Latvian SSR	(Soviet Union) Larisa Savchenko	(Soviet Union) Natasha Reva (Soviet Union) Julia Salnikova	6–2, 6–0
Winner	4.	1984	USSR Tennis National Championship	Tashkent, Uzbek SSR	(Soviet Union) Larisa Savchenko	(Soviet Union) Elena Eliseenko (Soviet Union) Julia Salnikova	6–1, 6–2
Winner	5.	1985	USSR Tennis National Championship	Tbilisi, Georgian SSR	(Soviet Union) Larisa Savchenko	(Soviet Union) Natalia Egorova (Soviet Union) Elena Eliseenko	7–5, 7–5
Winner	6.	1986	USSR Tennis National Championship	Alma-Ata, Kazakh SSR	(Soviet Union) Larisa Savchenko	(Soviet Union) Natasha Zvereva (Soviet Union) Leila Meskhi	6–2, 6–4
Winner	7.	1987	USSR Tennis National Championship	Tallinn, Soviet-occupied Estonia	(Soviet Union) Larisa Savchenko	(Soviet Union) Eugenia Maniokova (Soviet Union) Aida Khalatian	6–3, 6–3
Winner	8.	1987	USSR Winter Tennis National Championship	Moscow, Russian SFSR	(Soviet Union) Larisa Savchenko	(Soviet Union) Natalia Egorova (Soviet Union) Leila Meskhi	6–4, 6–3
Runner-up	9.	1988	USSR Winter Tennis National Championship	Moscow, Russian SFSR	(Soviet Union) Natalia Egorova	(Soviet Union) Larisa Savchenko (Soviet Union) Natasha Zvereva	6–7, 6–0, 4–6
Runner-up	10.	1991	USSR Tennis National Championship	Moscow, Russian SFSR	(Soviet Union) Natalia Egorova	(Soviet Union) Karina Kuregian (Soviet Union) Aida Khalatian	4–6, 3–6

=== Mixed (1–0) ===
Outcome	Year	Tournament	Location	Partner	Opponents	Score
Winner	1983	USSR Tennis National Championship	Jūrmala, Latvian SSR	(Soviet Union) Konstantin Pugaev	(Soviet Union) Vladimir Kurda (Soviet Union) Larisa Savchenko	6–4, 6–3

Awards
Preceded by (Australia) Anne Minter	Karen Krantzcke Sportsmanship Award; 1988	Succeeded by (United States) Gretchen Magers
