= Natalia Egorova =

Soviet/Russian tennis player

- Full name: Natalia Vladimirovna Egorova
- Country (sports): Soviet Union; Russia
- Born: September 13, 1966 (age 59) Moscow, Soviet Union now Russia
- Turned pro: 1985
- Retired: 2003
- Prize money: $134,904

Singles
- Career record: 219–183
- Career titles: 0 WTA, 2 ITF
- Highest ranking: No. 76 (27 February 1989)

Grand Slam singles results
- French Open: 3R (1988)
- Wimbledon: 1R (1988, 1993)
- US Open: 3R (1987)

Doubles
- Career record: 230–124
- Career titles: 2 WTA, 27 ITF
- Highest ranking: No. 26 (9 May 1988)

Grand Slam doubles results
- French Open: 1R (1988)
- Wimbledon: 2R (1988)
- US Open: 2R (1988)

Grand Slam mixed doubles results
- French Open: 1R (1988)

Team competitions
- Fed Cup: 6–2

Natalia Vladimirovna Egorova (Russian: Наталья Владимировна Егорова, romanized: Natalya Vladimirovna Yegorova; née Bykova, born 13 September 1966) is a retired professional tennis player who represented the Soviet Union and Russia.

Egorova won two doubles titles on the WTA Tour as well as two singles and 27 doubles titles on the ITF Women's Circuit. On 27 February 1989, she reached her best singles ranking of world number 76. On 9 May 1988, she peaked at number 26 in the WTA doubles rankings.

Playing for Soviet Union at the Fed Cup, Egorova has accumulated a win–loss record of 6–2.

Egorova retired from tennis in 2003.

== WTA career finals ==
=== Doubles: 3 (2 titles, 1 runner-up) ===
Winner – Legend Grand Slam tournaments (0–0) Tier I (0–0) Tier II (0–0) Tier III, IV & V (2–1)	Finals by surface Hard (2–0) Grass (0–0) Clay (0–1) Carpet (0–0)

Result	W/L	Date	Tournament	Surface	Partner	Opponents	Score
Loss	0–1	Sep 1987	Hamburg, West Germany	Clay	(Soviet Union) Leila Meskhi	(West Germany) Claudia Kohde-Kilsch (Czechoslovakia) Jana Novotná	6–7^{(1–7)}, 6–7^{(6–8)}
Win	1–1	Feb 1988	Kansas City, United States	Hard (i)	(Soviet Union) Svetlana Parkhomenko	(Czechoslovakia) Jana Novotná (France) Catherine Suire	6–3, 6–4
Win	2–1	Apr 1988	Singapore	Hard	(Soviet Union) Natalia Medvedeva	(Soviet Union) Leila Meskhi (Soviet Union) Svetlana Parkhomenko	7–6, 6–3

== ITF finals ==
$100,000 tournaments
$75,000 tournaments
$50,000 tournaments
$25,000 tournaments
$10,000 tournaments

=== Singles (2–4) ===
Result	No.	Date	Tournament	Surface	Opponent	Score
Loss	1.	6 January 1986	Key Biscayne, United States	Hard	(South Africa) Dianne Van Rensburg	4–6, 0–6
Win	1.	9 August 1997	Southsea, England	Grass	(Israel) Limor Gabai	6–3, 6–3
Loss	2.	27 September 1997	Sunderland, England	Carpet (i)	(South Africa) Mareze Joubert	3–6, 6–1, 5–7
Win	2.	4 October 1997	Nottingham, England	Hard (i)	(United Kingdom) Amanda Wainwright	6–2, 6–7, 6–1
Loss	3.	23 April 2001	Bournemouth, England	Clay	(Austria) Sandra Klemenschits	6–4, 2–6, 0–6
Loss	4.	19 August 2001	London, England	Hard	(Russia) Ekaterina Sysoeva	4–6, 4–6

=== Doubles (27–13) ===
Result	No.	Date	Tournament	Surface	Partner	Opponents	Score
Win	1.	30 December 1986	Chicago, United States	Hard	(Soviet Union) Viktoria Milvidskaia	(United States) Elizabeth Evans (United States) Jennifer Prah	6–1, 6–1
Win	2.	5 May 1986	Bournemouth, England	Grass	(Soviet Union) Natasha Zvereva	(Czechoslovakia) Regina Kordová (Czechoslovakia) Petra Tesarová	6–1, 6–2
Win	3.	8 September 1986	Zagreb, Yugoslavia	Clay	(Soviet Union) Viktoria Milvidskaia	(Socialist Federal Republic of Yugoslavia) Renata Šašak (Socialist Federal Republic of Yugoslavia) Karmen Škulj	6–2, 6–3
Win	4.	15 September 1986	Sofia, Bulgaria	Clay	(Soviet Union) Viktoria Milvidskaia	(Italy) Laura Golarsa (Netherlands) Marianne van der Torre	6–0, 6–2
Win	5.	19 October 1992	Moscow, Russia	Hard (i)	(Commonwealth of Independent States) Svetlana Parkhomenko	(Commonwealth of Independent States) Elena Likhovtseva (Commonwealth of Independent States) Julia Lutrova	6–4, 4–6, 6–4
Win	6.	1 February 1993	Newcastle, England	Carpet (i)	(Russia) Svetlana Parkhomenko	(Czech Republic) Pavlína Rajzlová (Czech Republic) Helena Vildová	6–4, 4–6, 6–0
Win	7.	8 February 1993	Sunderland, England	Carpet (i)	(Russia) Svetlana Parkhomenko	(Czech Republic) Pavlína Rajzlová (Czech Republic) Helena Vildová	2–6, 6–1, 7–6^{(5)}
Win	8.	19 April 1993	Nottingham, England	Hard (i)	(Russia) Svetlana Parkhomenko	(United Kingdom) Julie Salmon (United Kingdom) Lorna Woodroffe	5–1 ret.
Win	9.	3 May 1993	Bracknell, England	Hard	(Russia) Svetlana Parkhomenko	(United Kingdom) Claire Taylor (United Kingdom) Lorna Woodroffe	7–6, 6–1
Win	10.	12 July 1993	Frinton-on-Sea, England	Grass	(Russia) Svetlana Parkhomenko	(Australia) Maija Avotins (Australia) Lisa McShea	4–6, 6–2, 7–6^{(5)}
Loss	11.	20 September 1993	Sheffield, England	Hard (i)	(Russia) Svetlana Parkhomenko	(United Kingdom) Caroline Hunt (United Kingdom) Shirli-Ann Siddall	4–6, 5–7
Win	12.	4 October 1993	Basingstoke, England	Hard (i)	(Russia) Svetlana Parkhomenko	(Netherlands) Caroline Stassen (United Kingdom) Lorna Woodroffe	6–2, 6–1
Win	13.	8 November 1993	Swindon, England	Carpet (i)	(Russia) Svetlana Parkhomenko	(United Kingdom) Alison Smith (Netherlands) Caroline Stassen	6–0, 6–4
Win	14.	15 November 1993	Swansea, Wales	Hard (i)	(Russia) Svetlana Parkhomenko	(United Kingdom) Alison Smith (Netherlands) Caroline Stassen	6–1, 6–3
Win	15.	29 November 1993	Ramat HaSharon, Israel	Hard	(Russia) Svetlana Parkhomenko	(Germany) Angela Kerek (Ukraine) Olga Lugina	6–2, 6–3
Win	16.	4 July 1994	Felixstowe, England	Grass	(Russia) Svetlana Parkhomenko	(Netherlands) Caroline Stassen (United Kingdom) Lorna Woodroffe	6–3, 7–5
Loss	17.	11 July 1994	Frinton-on-Sea, England	Grass	(Russia) Svetlana Parkhomenko	(United Kingdom) Helen Crook (United Kingdom) Victoria Davies	3–6, 2–6
Win	18.	14 November 1994	Eastbourne, England	Carpet (i)	(Russia) Svetlana Parkhomenko	(United Kingdom) Shirli-Ann Siddall (United Kingdom) Amanda Wainwright	7–6^{(10–8)}, 7–6^{(8–6)}
Win	19.	6 February 1995	Sheffield, England	Hard (i)	(Russia) Svetlana Parkhomenko	(United Kingdom) Amanda Wainwright (United Kingdom) Lorna Woodroffe	6–4, 6–2
Win	20.	13 February 1995	Sunderland, England	Hard (i)	(Russia) Svetlana Parkhomenko	(United Kingdom) Michele Mair (Republic of Ireland) Karen Nugent	7–5, 6–0
Win	21.	8 May 1995	Lee-on-the-Solent, England	Clay	(Australia) Robyn Mawdsley	(United Kingdom) Kaye Hand (United Kingdom) Claire Taylor	7–6^{(7–0)}, 6–2
Win	22.	17 July 1995	Frinton-on-Sea, England	Grass	(Russia) Julia Lutrova	(Australia) Robyn Mawdsley (Australia) Shannon Peters	7–6^{(7–2)}, 1–6, 6–4
Loss	23.	27 August 1995	Sochi, Russia	Hard	(Finland) Petra Thorén	(United States) Corina Morariu (Ukraine) Elena Tatarkova	3–6, 5–7
Win	24.	2 October 1995	Šiauliai, Lithuania	Hard	(Russia) Maria Marfina	(Belarus) Natalia Noreiko (Belarus) Marina Stets	2–6, 6–3, 7–6^{(7–4)}
Win	25.	23 October 1995	Samara, Russia	Carpet (i)	(Russia) Maria Marfina	(Russia) Anna Linkova (Ukraine) Natalia Nemchinova	6–1, 6–0
Loss	26.	29 September 1996	Telford, England	Hard (i)	(Netherlands) Henriëtte van Aalderen	(United Kingdom) Julie Pullin (United Kingdom) Lorna Woodroffe	2–6, 6–7
Win	27.	20 October 1996	Samara, Russia	Carpet (i)	(Russia) Olga Ivanova	(Netherlands) Anique Snijders (Germany) Maja Živec-Škulj	4–6, 6–2, 6–3
Loss	28.	11 May 1997	Lee-on-the-Solent, England	Clay	(United States) Rebecca Jensen	(United Kingdom) Shirli-Ann Siddall (United Kingdom) Joanne Ward	2–6, 5–7
Loss	29.	19 July 1997	Frinton, England	Clay	(United Kingdom) Karen Cross	(United Kingdom) Joanne Ward (United Kingdom) Lorna Woodroffe	4–6, 6–2, 0–6
Loss	30.	24 August 1997	Kyiv, Ukraine	Clay	(Russia) Olga Ivanova	(Zimbabwe) Cara Black (Kazakhstan) Irina Selyutina	2–6, 4–6
Loss	31.	7 February 1998	Birkenhead, England	Hard (i)	(Russia) Olga Ivanova	(Italy) Giulia Casoni (Ukraine) Anna Zaporozhanova	3–6, 2–6
Loss	32.	2 May 1999	Hatfield, England	Clay	(Ukraine) Anna Zaporozhanova	(United Kingdom) Victoria Davies (United Kingdom) Kate Warne-Holland	5–7, 1–6
Loss	33.	13 February 2000	Birmingham, England	Hard (i)	(Russia) Ekaterina Sysoeva	(Russia) Elena Bovina (Ukraine) Anna Zaporozhanova	3–6, 4–6
Loss	34.	8 May 2000	Swansea, Wales	Clay	(Russia) Ekaterina Sysoeva	(Hungary) Nóra Köves (Socialist Federal Republic of Yugoslavia) Dragana Zarić	6–2, 4–6, 3–6
Loss	35.	16 July 2000	Felixstowe, England	Grass	(United Kingdom) Lucie Ahl	(Australia) Trudi Musgrave (United Kingdom) Lorna Woodroffe	4–6, 6–3, 4–6
Win	36.	30 April 2001	Hatfield, England	Clay	(Russia) Ekaterina Sysoeva	(United Kingdom) Elena Baltacha (United Kingdom) Nicola Trinder	6–3, 4–6, 6–1
Win	37.	7 May 2001	Swansea, Wales	Clay	(Russia) Ekaterina Sysoeva	(Russia) Maria Boboedova (Australia) Emily Hewson	4–6, 7–6^{(7–5)}, 6–0
Loss	38.	11 June 2001	Tallinn, Estonia	Clay	(Russia) Ekaterina Sysoeva	(Japan) Akiko Morigami (Japan) Miho Saeki	2–6, 6–7^{(9–7)}
Win	39.	8 August 2001	Bath, England	Hard	(Russia) Ekaterina Sysoeva	(Germany) Susi Bensch (Italy) Anna Floris	7–6^{(7–4)}, 7–6^{(7–4)}
Win	40.	9 October 2001	Cardiff, Wales	Hard (i)	(Russia) Ekaterina Sysoeva	(Germany) Angelika Bachmann (Germany) Vanessa Henke	6–4, 1–6, 6–2

== Other finals ==
=== Singles (0–2) ===
Result	No.	Year	Tournament	Location	Opponent	Score
Loss	1.	1986	USSR Winter Tennis National Championship	Moscow, Russian SFSR	(Soviet Union) Leila Meskhi	2–6, 1–6
Loss	2.	1987	USSR Winter Tennis National Championship	Moscow, Russian SFSR	(Soviet Union) Natalia Medvedeva	5–7, 4–6

=== Doubles (1–4) ===
Result	No.	Year	Tournament	Location	Partner	Opponents	Score
Loss	1.	1985	USSR Tennis National Championship	Tbilisi, Georgian SSR	(Soviet Union) Elena Eliseenko	(Soviet Union) Svetlana Parkhomenko (Soviet Union) Larisa Savchenko	5–7, 5–7
Loss	2.	1987	USSR Winter Tennis National Championship	Moscow, Russian SFSR	(Soviet Union) Leila Meskhi	(Soviet Union) Svetlana Parkhomenko (Soviet Union) Larisa Savchenko	4–6, 3–6
Win	3.	?	Donetsk, Ukrainian SSR	(Soviet Union) Elena Eliseenko	(Soviet Union) Liudmila Hovsepyan (Soviet Union) Olga Shaposhnikova	6–2, 6–4	
Loss	4.	1988	USSR Winter Tennis National Championship	Moscow, Russian SFSR	(Soviet Union) Svetlana Parkhomenko	(Soviet Union) Larisa Savchenko (Soviet Union) Natasha Zvereva	6–7, 6–0, 4–6
Loss	5.	1991	USSR Tennis National Championship	Moscow, Russian SFSR	(Soviet Union) Svetlana Parkhomenko	(Soviet Union) Karina Kuregian (Soviet Union) Aida Khalatian	4–6, 3–6

=== Mixed (0–2) ===
Result	No.	Year	Tournament	Location	Partner	Opponents	Score
Loss	1.	1987	USSR Tennis National Championship	Tallinn, Soviet Union	(Soviet Union) Andrei Olhovskiy	(Soviet Union) Andres Võsand (Soviet Union) Natasha Zvereva	2–6, 6–3, 3–6
Loss	2.	1991	USSR Tennis National Championship	Moscow, Russian SFSR	(Soviet Union) Alexei Filippov	(Soviet Union) Dimitri Poliakov (Soviet Union) Eugenia Maniokova	4–6, 4–6
