= Dianne Van Rensburg =

South African tennis player

- Country (sports): South Africa
- Born: 3 April 1968 (age 57) Salisbury, Rhodesia
- Turned pro: 1985
- Retired: 1995
- Plays: Right-handed (two-handed backhand)
- Prize money: 373,959

Singles
- Career record: 176–121
- Career titles: 1 WTA 2 ITF
- Highest ranking: No. 26 (14 January 1991)

Grand Slam singles results
- Australian Open: 4R (1990)
- French Open: 2R (1988, 1990)
- Wimbledon: 2R (1989, 1990)
- US Open: 3R (1990)

Doubles
- Career record: 112–90
- Career titles: 3 WTA 2 ITF
- Highest ranking: No. 27 (12 September 1988)

Grand Slam doubles results
- Australian Open: 3R (1989)
- French Open: 3R (1988, 1989)
- Wimbledon: 2R (1986, 1987, 1990, 1993)
- US Open: 2R (1987, 1988, 1990)

Dianne Van Rensburg (born 3 April 1968) is a former professional tennis player from South Africa. Known as Dinky, she won one singles title and three doubles titles from 1986 to 1990. She reached a highest singles ranking of No. 26 in January 1991.

== WTA Tour finals ==
=== Singles: 2 (1–1) ===
Legend (singles)
Tier I (0)
Tier II (0)
Tier III (0)
Tier IV & V (1-1)

Result	W–L	Date	Tournament	Surface	Opponent	Score
Loss	0–1	Sep 1988	Phoenix, United States	Hard	(Bulgaria) Manuela Maleeva	3–6, 6–4, 2–6
Win	1–1	Feb 1990	Wichita, United States	Hard (i)	(France) Nathalie Tauziat	2–6, 7–5, 6–2

=== Doubles: 8 (3–5) ===
Result	W–L	Date	Tournament	Surface	Partner	Opponents	Score
Win	1–0	Sep 1986	Tulsa, United States	Hard	(United States) Camille Benjamin	(Soviet Union) Svetlana Cherneva (Soviet Union) Larisa Savchenko	7–6, 7–5
Loss	1–1	Oct 1987	Athens, Greece	Clay	(United States) Kathy Horvath	(West Germany) Andrea Betzner (Austria) Judith Wiesner	4–6, 6–7^{(0–7)}
Win	2–1	May 1988	Geneva, Switzerland	Clay	(Switzerland) Christiane Jolissaint	(Sweden) Maria Lindström (West Germany) Claudia Porwik	6–1, 6–3
Loss	2–2	Jun 1988	Eastbourne, England	Grass	(New Zealand) Belinda Cordwell	(West Germany) Eva Pfaff (Australia) Elizabeth Smylie	3–6, 6–7^{(6–8)}
Loss	2–3	Aug 1988	San Diego, United States	Hard	(United States) Betsy Nagelsen	(United States) Patty Fendick (Canada) Jill Hetherington	6–7^{(10–12)}, 4–6
Loss	2–4	Feb 1990	Washington DC, United States	Carpet (i)	(United States) Ann Henricksson	(United States) Zina Garrison (United States) Martina Navratilova	0–6, 3–6
Win	3–4	May 1990	Geneva, Switzerland	Clay	(Australia) Louise Field	(United States) Elise Burgin (United States) Betsy Nagelsen	5–7, 7–6^{(7–2)}, 7–5
Loss	3–5	Oct 1990	Zürich, Switzerland	Carpet (i)	(France) Catherine Suire	(Netherlands) Manon Bollegraf (West Germany) Eva Pfaff	5–7, 4–6

== ITF finals ==
$25,000 tournaments
$10,000 tournaments

=== Singles (3–2) ===
Result	No.	Date	Tournament	Surface	Opponent	Score
Loss	1.	6 May 1985	Bournemouth, United Kingdom	Hard	(Italy) Barbara Romano	1–6, 4–6
Win	2.	6 January 1986	Key Biscayne, United States	Hard	(Soviet Union) Natalia Egorova	6–4, 6–0
Win	3.	17 November 1986	Johannesburg, South Africa	Hard	(South Africa) Rene Mentz	6–3, 6–1
Win	4.	24 November 1986	Pretoria, South Africa	Hard	(South Africa) Karen Schimper	4–6, 6–1, 6–4
Loss	5.	10 October 1994	Sedona, United States	Hard	(United States) Elly Hakami	5–7, 6–1, 5–7

=== Doubles (2–3) ===
Result	No.	Date	Tournament	Surface	Partner	Opponents	Score
Loss	1.	20 January 1986	San Antonio, United States	Hard	(United Kingdom) Clare Wood	(Netherlands) Manon Bollegraf (Netherlands) Marianne van der Torre	5–7, 7–6^{(7–4)}, 4–6
Loss	2.	21 April 1986	Taranto, Italy	Hard	(Netherlands) Nanette Schutte	(Czechoslovakia) Hana Fukárková (Czechoslovakia) Jana Novotná	5–7, 0–6
Loss	3.	17 November 1986	Johannesburg, South Africa	Hard	(United States) Mary Dailey	(South Africa) Elna Reinach (South Africa) Monica Reinach	6–1, 1–6, 3–6
Win	4.	24 November 1986	Pretoria, South Africa	Hard	(United States) Mary Dailey	(South Africa) Janet Kock (South Africa) Karen Schimper	7–5, 6–4
Win	5.	18 January 1988	Pretoria, South Africa	Hard	(South Africa) Elna Reinach	(South Africa) Linda Barnard (South Africa) Mariaan de Swardt	3–6, 6–4, 6–4
