= Wendy White (tennis) =

American tennis player

- Country (sports): United States
- Born: September 29, 1960 (age 65) Atlanta, Georgia, U.S.
- Height: 5 ft 7 in (1.70 m)
- Plays: Right–handed
- Prize money: US$ 573,859

Singles
- Career record: 220–214
- Career titles: 1

Grand Slam singles results
- Australian Open: 2R (1982)
- French Open: 3R (1983)
- Wimbledon: 3R (1979, 1981, 1983, 1985)
- US Open: 3R (1979, 1980, 1982)

Doubles
- Career record: 152–173
- Career titles: 3

Grand Slam doubles results
- French Open: 2R (1981, 1983, 1984)
- Wimbledon: 3R (1981–82, 1984, 1989–90)
- US Open: QF (1978, 1983)

Wendy White-Prausa (born 29 September 1960) is a former professional tennis player.

== Early life and education ==
White was born in 1960 in the state of Georgia. When she was 8, she learned to play tennis at a summer camp. White became a dominant junior player in her state and on the sectional and national levels. From 1977 to 1978, she won or was a finalist in over 30 national junior and amateur championships. In 1978, she was offered a full scholarship to Rollins College. In 1980, she was named Collegiate Player of the Year by Tennis. She won the Broderick Award (now the Honda Sports Award) as the nation's top collegiate tennis player in 1980. After winning the AIAW National Championship (the NCAA did not hold tennis championship for women players until 1982), White turned pro in 1980 as a sophomore. She is the only woman tennis player to turn professional and still graduate on time from college.

== Career ==
White played on the WTA tour from 1978 to 1990. She won a singles title at the Virginia Slims of Kansas in 1986 and a doubles title at the Virginia Slims of Oklahoma in 1990, and twice reached the quarterfinals of the U.S. Open doubles. She attained career-high rankings of #28 in singles on August 3, 1987 and #18 in doubles on September 10, 1990.

== Career finals ==
=== Singles (1 title, 1 runner up) ===
| Result | W/L | Date | Tournament | Surface | Opponent | Score |
|---|---|---|---|---|---|---|
| Win | 1–0 | Jan 1986 | Virginia Slims of Kansas, U.S. | Carpet (i) | (United States) Betsy Nagelsen | 6–1, 6–7^{(5–7)}, 6–2 |
| Loss | 1–1 | Jul 1987 | Virginia Slims of Newport, U.S. | Grass | (United States) Pam Shriver | 2–6, 4–6 |

== Personal ==
After retiring in 1992, White continued to coach and play. She has been active in the Fellowship of Christian Athletes.
