= Virginia Slims of Kansas =

VS of Kansas

Defunct tennis tournament
- Event name: VS of Kansas (1978, 1983–89); Avon Championships of Kansas (1980–82); Breyers Tennis Classic (1990)
- Tour: WTA Tour (1978–90)
- Founded: 1978
- Abolished: 1990
- Editions: 10
- Surface: Hard (1978, 1988–90); Carpet (1980–82, 1986–87); Hard (1983)

The Virginia Slims of Kansas is a defunct WTA Tour affiliated women's tennis tournament played from 1978 to 1990. It was held in Kansas City, Missouri in the United States from 1978 to 1983 and in Wichita, Kansas in the United States from 1986 to 1990, and was played on indoor hard courts in 1978 and from 1988 to 1990, on indoor carpet courts from 1980 to 1982 and from 1986 to 1987, and on outdoor hard courts in 1983.

Martina Navratilova was a player at the tournament, winning the singles competition three times and the doubles competitions twice partnering American Billie Jean King.

== Past finals ==
=== Singles ===
Year	Champions	Runners-up	Score
1978	(United States) Martina Navratilova	(United States) Billie Jean King	7–5, 2–6, 6–3
1979	Not Held		
1980	(United States) Martina Navratilova	(South Africa) Greer Stevens	6–0, 6–2
1981	(United States) Andrea Jaeger	(United States) Martina Navratilova	3–6, 6–3, 7–5
1982	(United States) Martina Navratilova	(United States) Barbara Potter	6–2, 6–2
1983	(Australia) Elizabeth Sayers	(Australia) Anne Minter	6–3, 6–1
1984 - 1985	Not Held		
1986	(United States) Wendy White	(United States) Betsy Nagelsen	6–1, 6–7^{(5–7)}, 6–2
1987	(United States) Barbara Potter	(Soviet Union) Larisa Savchenko	7–6^{(8–6)}, 7–6^{(7–5)}
1988	(Bulgaria) Manuela Maleeva-Fragnière	(West Germany) Sylvia Hanika	7–6^{(7–5)}, 7–5
1989	(United States) Amy Frazier	(United States) Barbara Potter	4–6, 6–4, 6–0
1990	(South Africa) Dianne Van Rensburg	(France) Nathalie Tauziat	2–6, 7–5, 6–2

=== Doubles ===
Year	Champions	Runners-up	Score
1978	(United States) Billie Jean King (United States) Martina Navratilova	(Australia) Kerry Reid (Australia) Wendy Turnbull	6–4, 6–4
1979	Not Held		
1980	(United States) Billie Jean King (United States) Martina Navratilova	(United States) Laura duPont (United States) Pam Shriver	6–3, 6–1
1981	(United States) Barbara Potter (United States) Sharon Walsh	(United States) Rosemary Casals (Australia) Wendy Turnbull	6–2, 7–6
1982	(United States) Barbara Potter (United States) Sharon Walsh	(United States) Mary Lou Piatek (United States) Anne Smith	4–6, 6–2, 6–2
1983	(United States) Sandy Collins (Australia) Elizabeth Sayers	(Australia) Chris O'Neil (Australia) Brenda Remilton	7–5, 7–6
1984 - 1985	Not Held		
1986	(United States) Kathy Jordan (United States) Candy Reynolds	(United States) JoAnne Russell (United States) Anne Smith	6–3, 6–7, 6–3
1987	(Soviet Union) Svetlana Parkhomenko (Soviet Union) Larisa Savchenko	(United States) Barbara Potter (United States) Wendy White	6–2, 6–4
1988	(Soviet Union) Natalia Bykova (Soviet Union) Svetlana Parkhomenko	(Czechoslovakia) Jana Novotná (France) Catherine Suire	6–3, 6–4
1989	(Netherlands) Manon Bollegraf (South Africa) Lise Gregory	(United States) Sandy Collins (Soviet Union) Leila Meskhi	6–2, 7–6
1990	(Netherlands) Manon Bollegraf (United States) Meredith McGrath	(United States) Mary Lou Daniels (United States) Wendy White	6–0, 6–2
