= 1990 Virginia Slims of Nashville – Singles =

Singles
- 1990 Virginia Slims of Nashville

Final
- Champion: (Soviet Union) Natalia Medvedeva
- Runner-up: (United States) Susan Sloane
- Score: 6–3, 7–6^{(7–3)}

Details
- Draw: 32 (4Q)
- Seeds: 8

Events
| Singles | Doubles |
| ← 1989 · | Virginia Slims of Nashville | · 1991 → |

Leila Meskhi was the defending champion, but lost in the first round to Cecilia Dahlman.

Natalia Medvedeva won the title by defeating Susan Sloane 6–3, 7–6^{(7–3)} in the final.

== Seeds ==
1. (Soviet Union) Leila Meskhi (first round)
2. (Canada) Helen Kelesi (first round)
3. (Italy) Raffaella Reggi (quarterfinals)
4. (West Germany) Claudia Porwik (first round)
5. (United States) Susan Sloane (final)
6. (Soviet Union) Larisa Savchenko (first round)
7. (Australia) Elizabeth Smylie (first round)
8. (Netherlands) Brenda Schultz (second round)

== Draw ==
=== Key ===
- Q = Qualifier
- WC = Wild card
- LL = Lucky loser
- Alt = Alternate
- SE = Special exempt
- PR = Protected ranking
- ITF = ITF entry
- JE = Junior exempt
- w/o = Walkover
- r = Retired
- d = Defaulted
- SR = Special ranking

=== Finals ===
Semifinals
(Soviet Union) Natalia Medvedeva | 6 | 6
(Soviet Union) Elena Brioukhovets | 3 | 4
5 | (United States) Susan Sloane | 6 | 4 | 6
(South Africa) Elna Reinach | 3 | 6 | 0

Final
(Soviet Union) Natalia Medvedeva | 6 | 7^{7}
5 | (United States) Susan Sloane | 3 | 6^{3}

=== Top half ===
First round
1 | (Soviet Union) L Meskhi | 6^{7} | 5
(Sweden) C Dahlman | 7^{9} | 7
Q | (Canada) J Hetherington | 6 | 7
Q | (United States) S Collins | 4 | 5
Q | (United States) E deLone | 6^{5} | 2
(Soviet Union) N Medvedeva | 7^{7} | 6
(Italy) L Ferrando | 6 | 6
7 | (Australia) E Smylie | 4 | 3
4 | (West Germany) C Porwik | 4 | 6 | 4
(United States) E Burgin | 6 | 1 | 6
(Argentina) B Fulco | 6^{4} | 0
Q | (United States) T Whitlinger | 7^{7} | 6
(Austria) B Reinstadler | 5 | 5
(Soviet Union) E Brioukhovets | 7 | 7
(Netherlands) C Vis | 6 | 7^{7}
6 | (Soviet Union) L Savchenko | 3 | 6^{3}

Second round
(Sweden) C Dahlman | 7 | 6
Q | (Canada) J Hetherington | 5 | 0
(Soviet Union) N Medvedeva | 6^{4} | 6 | 6
(Italy) L Ferrando | 7^{7} | 2 | 3
(United States) E Burgin | 6 | 2 | 0
Q | (United States) T Whitlinger | 4 | 6 | 6
(Soviet Union) E Brioukhovets | 3 | 6 | 6
(Netherlands) C Vis | 6 | 2 | 2

Quarterfinals
(Sweden) C Dahlman | 3 | 4
(Soviet Union) N Medvedeva | 6 | 6
Q | (United States) T Whitlinger | 3 | 7 | 1
(Soviet Union) E Brioukhovets | 6 | 5 | 6

Semifinals
(Soviet Union) N Medvedeva | 6 | 6
(Soviet Union) E Brioukhovets | 3 | 4

=== Bottom half ===
First round
5 | (United States) S Sloane | 6 | 6
(Bulgaria) E Pampoulova | 3 | 2
(United States) H Cioffi | 6 | 6^{7} | 6^{1}
(United States) A Keller | 4 | 7^{9} | 7^{7}
(Belgium) S Wasserman | 6 | 1 | 6
(United States) C Benjamin | 3 | 6 | 3
(South Africa) A Coetzer | 4 | 2
3 | (Italy) R Reggi | 6 | 6
8 | (Netherlands) B Schultz | 7^{7} | 6
(United States) K Adams | 6^{2} | 3
(United States) A Grossman | 1 | 3
(South Africa) E Reinach | 6 | 6
(United States) L Harvey Wild | 4 | 6 | 6
(Mexico) A Gavaldón | 6 | 2 | 0
(Australia) N Provis | 7^{7} | 6
2 | (Canada) H Kelesi | 6^{4} | 3

Second round
5 | (United States) S Sloane | 6 | 6
(United States) A Keller | 3 | 2
(Belgium) S Wasserman | 4 | 4
3 | (Italy) R Reggi | 6 | 6
8 | (Netherlands) B Schultz | 6 | 1 | 4
(South Africa) E Reinach | 4 | 6 | 6
(United States) L Harvey Wild | 7^{9} | 6
(Australia) N Provis | 6^{7} | 2

Quarterfinals
5 | (United States) S Sloane | 6 | 6
3 | (Italy) R Reggi | 3 | 3
(South Africa) E Reinach | 6 | 6
(United States) L Harvey Wild | 3 | 3

Semifinals
5 | (United States) S Sloane | 6 | 4 | 6
(South Africa) E Reinach | 3 | 6 | 0
