= 1990 Virginia Slims of Nashville – Doubles =

Doubles
- 1990 Virginia Slims of Nashville

Final
- Champions: (United States) Kathy Jordan (Soviet Union) Larisa Savchenko
- Runners-up: (Netherlands) Brenda Schultz (Netherlands) Caroline Vis
- Score: 6–1, 6–2

Details
- Draw: 16
- Seeds: 4

Events
Singles	Doubles
← 1989 ·	Virginia Slims of Nashville	· 1991 →

Manon Bollegraf and Meredith McGrath were the defending champions, but none competed this year. McGrath chose to compete at Oakland during the same week, winning the doubles title.

Kathy Jordan and Larisa Savchenko won the title by defeating Brenda Schultz and Caroline Vis 6–1, 6–2 in the final.

== Seeds ==
1. (United States) Kathy Jordan / (Soviet Union) Larisa Savchenko (champions)
2. (United States) Elise Burgin / (United States) Pam Shriver (first round)
3. (Australia) Nicole Bradtke / (South Africa) Elna Reinach (quarterfinals)
4. (Soviet Union) Natalia Medvedeva / (Soviet Union) Leila Meskhi (semifinals)

== Draw ==
=== Key ===
- Q = Qualifier
- WC = Wild card
- LL = Lucky loser
- Alt = Alternate
- SE = Special exempt
- PR = Protected ranking
- ITF = ITF entry
- JE = Junior exempt
- w/o = Walkover
- r = Retired
- d = Defaulted
- SR = Special ranking

=== Draw ===
First round
1	(United States) K Jordan (Soviet Union) L Savchenko	6	6
(Italy) L Ferrando (Argentina) B Fulco	1	4
(United States) K Adams (Canada) J Hetherington	6	6
(United States) Heidi Allsmiller (United States) Julie Walther	2	0
4	(Soviet Union) N Medvedeva (Soviet Union) L Meskhi	6	6
(United States) A Grossman (United States) S Stafford	2	1
Q	(United States) S Sloane (United States) H Cioffi	6^{5}	0
(France) S Amiach (Bulgaria) E Pampoulova	7^{7}	6
(Soviet Union) E Brioukhovets (New Zealand) J Richardson	3	3
(Netherlands) B Schultz (Netherlands) C Vis	6	6
(Canada) H Kelesi (Italy) R Reggi	1	1
3	(Australia) N Provis (South Africa) E Reinach	6	6
(United States) S Collins (United States) T Whitlinger	6	6
(Austria) B Reinstadler (Belgium) S Wasserman	4	1
(West Germany) C Porwik (Australia) E Smylie	6	6
2	(United States) E Burgin (United States) P Shriver	3	1

Quarterfinals
1	(United States) K Jordan (Soviet Union) L Savchenko	7^{7}	6
(United States) K Adams (Canada) J Hetherington	6^{2}	2
4	(Soviet Union) N Medvedeva (Soviet Union) L Meskhi	7	6
(France) S Amiach (Bulgaria) E Pampoulova	5	4
(Netherlands) B Schultz (Netherlands) C Vis	2	7^{10}	6
3	(Australia) N Provis (South Africa) E Reinach	6	6^{8}	4
(United States) S Collins (United States) T Whitlinger	6	1	7
(West Germany) C Porwik (Australia) E Smylie	3	6	5

Semifinals
1	(United States) K Jordan (Soviet Union) L Savchenko	6	7^{9}
4	(Soviet Union) N Medvedeva (Soviet Union) L Meskhi	1	6^{7}
(Netherlands) B Schultz (Netherlands) C Vis	3	6	7^{7}
(United States) S Collins (United States) T Whitlinger	6	3	6^{3}

Final
1	(United States) K Jordan (Soviet Union) L Savchenko	6	6
(Netherlands) B Schultz (Netherlands) C Vis	1	2
