= 1989 Virginia Slims of Nashville =

- Date: November 6–12
- Edition: 5th
- Category: Category 2
- Draw: 32S / 16D
- Prize money: $100,000
- Surface: Hard / indoor
- Location: Brentwood, Tennessee, U.S.
- Venue: Maryland Farms Racquet Club

Champions

Singles
- (Soviet Union) Leila Meskhi

Doubles
- (Netherlands) Manon Bollegraf / (United States) Meredith McGrath
← 1988 ·	Virginia Slims of Nashville	· 1990 →

The 1989 Virginia Slims of Nashville was a women's tennis tournament played on indoor hard courts at the Maryland Farms Racquet Club in Brentwood, Tennessee in the United States and was part of Category 2 tier of the 1989 WTA Tour. It was the fifth edition of the tournament and ran from November 6 through November 12, 1989. Sixth-seeded Leila Meskhi won the singles title.

== Finals ==
=== Singles ===
(Soviet Union) Leila Meskhi defeated (Canada) Helen Kelesi 6–2, 6–3

- It was Meskhi's first singles title of her career.

=== Doubles ===
(Netherlands) Manon Bollegraf / (United States) Meredith McGrath defeated (Soviet Union) Natalia Medvedeva / (Soviet Union) Leila Meskhi 1–6, 7–6^{(7–5)}, 7–6^{(7–4)}
