= 1989 Virginia Slims of Nashville – Doubles =

Doubles
- 1989 Virginia Slims of Nashville

Final
- Champions: (Netherlands) Manon Bollegraf (United States) Meredith McGrath
- Runners-up: (Soviet Union) Natalia Medvedeva (Soviet Union) Leila Meskhi
- Score: 1–6, 7–6^{(7–5)}, 7–6^{(7–4)}

Details
- Draw: 16
- Seeds: 4

Events
Singles	Doubles
← 1988 ·	Virginia Slims of Nashville	· 1990 →

Jenny Byrne and Janine Tremelling were the defending champions, but none competed this year.

Manon Bollegraf and Meredith McGrath won the title by defeating Natalia Medvedeva and Leila Meskhi 1–6, 7–6^{(7–5)}, 7–6^{(7–4)} in the final.

== Seeds ==
1. (Australia) Elizabeth Smylie / (Australia) Wendy Turnbull (semifinals)
2. (Netherlands) Manon Bollegraf / (United States) Meredith McGrath (champions)
3. (United States) Louise Allen / (Canada) Jill Hetherington (first round)
4. (United States) Mary-Lou Daniels / (United States) Wendy White (quarterfinals)

== Draw ==
=== Key ===
- Q = Qualifier
- WC = Wild card
- LL = Lucky loser
- Alt = Alternate
- SE = Special exempt
- PR = Protected ranking
- ITF = ITF entry
- JE = Junior exempt
- w/o = Walkover
- r = Retired
- d = Defaulted
- SR = Special ranking

=== Draw ===
First round
1	(Australia) E Smylie (Australia) W Turnbull	6	7
(Canada) H Kelesi (West Germany) C Porwik	0	5
(Czechoslovakia) J Pospíšilová (Netherlands) H Witvoet	3	6	5
(United States) K Foxworth (United States) T Whittington	6	4	7
4	(United States) ML Daniels (United States) W White	3	6	7
(Hong Kong) P Hy (Japan) E Inoue	6	3	6
(Soviet Union) N Medvedeva (Soviet Union) L Meskhi	6	6
(United States) L Bartlett (Argentina) F Labat	4	1
(United States) Ca MacGregor (United States) Cy MacGregor	6	7
(United States) LA Eldredge (United States) M Norwood	4	6
(United States) A Keller (United States) L Spadea	7	6
3	(United States) L Allen (Canada) J Hetherington	6	3
(United States) H Cioffi (United States) J Thomas	3	6
(United States) P Barg (United States) P Louie Harper	6	7
(United States) S Martin (United States) S Sloane	3	0
2	(Netherlands) M Bollegraf (United States) M McGrath	6	6

Quarterfinals
1	(Australia) E Smylie (Australia) W Turnbull	6	6
(United States) K Foxworth (United States) T Whittington	1	4
4	(United States) ML Daniels (United States) W White	2	4
(Soviet Union) N Medvedeva (Soviet Union) L Meskhi	6	6
(United States) Ca MacGregor (United States) Cy MacGregor	3	6	7
(United States) A Keller (United States) L Spadea	6	3	6
(United States) P Barg (United States) P Louie Harper	2	6
2	(Netherlands) M Bollegraf (United States) M McGrath	6	7

Semifinals
1	(Australia) E Smylie (Australia) W Turnbull	4	6
(Soviet Union) N Medvedeva (Soviet Union) L Meskhi	6	7
(United States) Ca MacGregor (United States) Cy MacGregor	2	4
2	(Netherlands) M Bollegraf (United States) M McGrath	6	6

Final
(Soviet Union) N Medvedeva (Soviet Union) L Meskhi	6	6^{5}	6^{4}
2	(Netherlands) M Bollegraf (United States) M McGrath	1	7^{7}	7^{7}
