= 1989 Virginia Slims of Nashville – Singles =

Singles
- 1989 Virginia Slims of Nashville

Final
- Champion: (Soviet Union) Leila Meskhi
- Runner-up: (Canada) Helen Kelesi
- Score: 6–2, 6–3

Details
- Draw: 32 (4Q/2LL)
- Seeds: 8

Events
Singles	Doubles
← 1988 ·	Virginia Slims of Nashville	· 1990 →

Susan Sloane was the defending champion, but lost in the semifinals to Helen Kelesi.

Leila Meskhi won the title by defeating Kelesi 6–2, 6–3 in the final. Meskhi became the first soviet woman in 15 years to win a professional tournament at the United States, after Olga Morozova won at Philadelphia in 1974.

== Seeds ==
1. (Bulgaria) Katerina Maleeva (quarterfinals)
2. (Canada) Helen Kelesi (final)
3. (n/a)
4. (United States) Susan Sloane (semifinals)
5. (Netherlands) Manon Bollegraf (semifinals)
6. (Soviet Union) Leila Meskhi (champion)
7. (United States) Halle Cioffi (first round)
8. (Czechoslovakia) Jana Pospíšilová (quarterfinals)

== Draw ==
=== Key ===
- Q = Qualifier
- WC = Wild card
- LL = Lucky loser
- Alt = Alternate
- SE = Special exempt
- PR = Protected ranking
- ITF = ITF entry
- JE = Junior exempt
- w/o = Walkover
- r = Retired
- d = Defaulted
- SR = Special ranking

=== Finals ===
Semifinals
6	(Soviet Union) Leila Meskhi	6	6
5	(Netherlands) Manon Bollegraf	3	3
4	(United States) Susan Sloane	2	3
2	(Canada) Helen Kelesi	6	6

Final
6	(Soviet Union) Leila Meskhi	6	6
2	(Canada) Helen Kelesi	2	3

=== Top half ===
First round
1	(Bulgaria) K Maleeva	6	6
(Canada) R Simpson	0	3
Q	(United States) A Keller	6	7
(United States) T Whitlinger	1	6
LL	(Japan) Y Koizumi	3	6	5
(Argentina) F Labat	6	1	7
Q	(United States) A Ivan	2	3
6	(Soviet Union) L Meskhi	6	6
5	(Netherlands) M Bollegraf	3	6	6
Q	(United States) L Harvey Wild	6	3	4
(Japan) E Inoue	7	6
(France) M Pierce	5	4
(United States) C MacGregor	3	6
(Soviet Union) N Medvedeva	6	7
(Australia) E Smylie	6	6
7	(United States) H Cioffi	4	3

Second round
1	(Bulgaria) K Maleeva	6	6
Q	(United States) A Keller	2	1
(Argentina) F Labat	0	5
6	(Soviet Union) L Meskhi	6	7
5	(Netherlands) M Bollegraf	6	6
(Japan) E Inoue	4	4
(Soviet Union) N Medvedeva	6	7
(Australia) E Smylie	3	5

Quarterfinals
1	(Bulgaria) K Maleeva	6	3	5
6	(Soviet Union) L Meskhi	2	6	7
5	(Netherlands) M Bollegraf	7	5	6
(Soviet Union) N Medvedeva	6	7	3

Semifinals
6	(Soviet Union) L Meskhi	6	6
5	(Netherlands) M Bollegraf	3	3

=== Bottom half ===
First round
(United States) S Martin	3	7	3
(United States) W White	6	5	6
(West Germany) C Porwik	7	6
(United States) K Kessaris	6	3
(United States) M McGrath	4	4
(United States) B Bowes	6	6
Q	(Venezuela) M Mazzotta	2	1
4	(United States) S Sloane	6	6
8	(Czechoslovakia) J Pospíšilová	6	6
(United States) P Louie Harper	3	3
(United States) C Cunningham	6	6
LL	(United States) A Farley	2	0
(United States) ML Daniels	6	6	6
(United States) L Allen	7	3	4
(Canada) J Hetherington	4	6
2	(Canada) H Kelesi	6	7

Second round
(United States) W White	6	7
(West Germany) C Porwik	3	6
(United States) B Bowes	2	6
4	(United States) S Sloane	6	7
8	(Czechoslovakia) J Pospíšilová	6	6
(United States) C Cunningham	2	0
(United States) ML Daniels	6	4
2	(Canada) H Kelesi	7	6

Quarterfinals
(United States) W White	2	4
4	(United States) S Sloane	6	6
8	(Czechoslovakia) J Pospíšilová	2	3
2	(Canada) H Kelesi	6	6

Semifinals
4	(United States) S Sloane	2	3
2	(Canada) H Kelesi	6	6
