= 1991 Virginia Slims of Nashville – Singles =

Singles
- 1991 Virginia Slims of Nashville

Final
- Champion: (Belgium) Sabine Appelmans
- Runner-up: (United States) Katrina Adams
- Score: 6–2, 6–4

Details
- Draw: 32 (4Q/2LL)
- Seeds: 8

Events
Singles	Doubles
- Virginia Slims of Nashville

Natalia Medvedeva was the defending champion, but lost in the semifinals to Katrina Adams.

Sabine Appelmans won the title by defeating 6–2, 6–4 in the final.

== Seeds ==
1. (Spain) Conchita Martínez (first round)
2. (France) Julie Halard (first round)
3. (Czechoslovakia) Radomira Zrubáková (first round)
4. (Belgium) Sabine Appelmans (champion)
5. (Canada) Helen Kelesi (first round)
6. (Czechoslovakia) Eva Švíglerová (first round)
7. (Soviet Union) Natalia Medvedeva (semifinals)
8. (Indonesia) Yayuk Basuki (quarterfinals)

== Draw ==
Key

- Q = Qualifier
- WC = Wild card
- LL = Lucky loser
- Alt = Alternate
- ITF = ITF entry
- PR = Protected ranking
- SR = Special ranking
- SE = Special exempt
- JE = Junior exempt
- JR = Junior Accelerator Programme entrant
- CO = College Accelerator Programme entrant
- NG = Next Gen Accelerator Program entrant
- w/o = Walkover
- r = Retired
- d = Defaulted

=== Finals ===
Semifinals
(Czechoslovakia) Karina Habšudová	3	4
4	(Belgium) Sabine Appelmans	6	6
(United States) Katrina Adams	7^{7}	5	6
7	(Soviet Union) Natalia Medvedeva	6^{3}	7	4

Final
4	(Belgium) Sabine Appelmans	6	6
(United States) Katrina Adams	2	4

=== Top half ===
First round
1	(Spain) C Martínez	3	6	4
(Australia) N Provis	6	4	6
(Czechoslovakia) K Habšudová	7	6
(Netherlands) C Vis	5	1
(Japan) M Kidowaki	2	3
(Soviet Union) L Savchenko	6	6
(Australia) E Smylie	1	1
8	(Indonesia) Y Basuki	6	6
4	(Belgium) S Appelmans	7	3	6
(United States) S Sloane-Lundy	5	6	4
(United States) C Cunningham	6	6
Q	(United States) A Keller	2	1
(United States) D Faber	6	1	6^{5}
(Argentina) C Tessi	1	6	7^{7}
Q	(United States) ML Daniels	6	6
5	(Canada) H Kelesi	2	4

Second round
(Australia) N Provis	2	6	1
(Czechoslovakia) K Habšudová	6	4	6
(Soviet Union) L Savchenko	1	3
8	(Indonesia) Y Basuki	6	6
4	(Belgium) S Appelmans	6	6
(United States) C Cunningham	4	3
(Argentina) C Tessi	2	3
Q	(United States) ML Daniels	6	6

Quarterfinals
(Czechoslovakia) K Habšudová	6	6
8	(Indonesia) Y Basuki	4	2
4	(Belgium) S Appelmans	6	6
Q	(United States) ML Daniels	4	4

Semifinals
(Czechoslovakia) K Habšudová	3	4
4	(Belgium) S Appelmans	6	6

=== Bottom half ===
First round
6	(Czechoslovakia) E Švíglerová	2	7^{7}	1
LL	(Finland) P Thorén	6	6^{5}	6
(United States) K Adams	7^{7}	7^{9}
(Czechoslovakia) P Langrová	6^{5}	6^{7}
Q	(United States) T Whittington	7	7^{13}
(Argentina) F Labat	5	6^{11}
LL	(United States) L Allen	1	7^{9}	6
3	(Czechoslovakia) R Zrubáková	6	6^{7}	3
7	(Soviet Union) N Medvedeva	6	6
(South Africa) E Reinach	1	2
(West Germany) C Porwik	6	6
Q	(United States) H Cioffi	3	1
(South Africa) A Coetzer	3	1
(Soviet Union) E Brioukhovets	6	6
(France) I Demongeot	6	6
2	(France) J Halard	1	1

Second round
LL	(Finland) P Thorén	3	6	3
(United States) K Adams	6	2	6
Q	(United States) T Whittington	7	2	6
LL	(United States) L Allen	5	6	4
7	(Soviet Union) N Medvedeva	6	7^{7}
(West Germany) C Porwik	1	6^{4}
(Soviet Union) E Brioukhovets	2	3
(France) I Demongeot	6	6

Quarterfinals
(United States) K Adams	7	6
Q	(United States) T Whittington	5	1
7	(Soviet Union) N Medvedeva	3	7	6
(France) I Demongeot	6	5	2

Semifinals
(United States) K Adams	7^{7}	5	6
7	(Soviet Union) N Medvedeva	6^{3}	7	4
