= 1988 Virginia Slims of Nashville – Singles =

Singles
- 1988 Virginia Slims of Nashville

Final
- Champion: (United States) Susan Sloane
- Runner-up: (United States) Beverly Bowes
- Score: 6–3, 6–2

Events
Singles	Doubles
← 1987 ·	Virginia Slims of Nashville	· 1989 →

Susan Sloane won in the final 6–3, 6–2 against Beverly Bowes.

== Seeds ==
A champion seed is indicated in bold text while text in italics indicates the round in which that seed was eliminated.

1. (United States) Barbara Potter (quarterfinals)
2. (United States) Lori McNeil (semifinals)
3. (Canada) Helen Kelesi (quarterfinals)
4. (Argentina) Bettina Fulco (second round)
5. (Australia) Anne Minter (second round)
6. (United States) Halle Cioffi (quarterfinals)
7. (Soviet Union) Leila Meskhi (semifinals)
8. (South Africa) Rosalyn Fairbank (first round)

== Draw ==
=== Key ===
- Q = Qualifier
- WC = Wild card
- LL = Lucky loser
- Alt = Alternate
- SE = Special exempt
- PR = Protected ranking
- ITF = ITF entry
- JE = Junior exempt
- w/o = Walkover
- r = Retired
- d = Defaulted
- SR = Special ranking

First round
1	(United States) **B Potter**	**7**	**6**
(United States) M Gurney	6	1
(Soviet Union) N Bykova	4	1
(United States) **K Rinaldi**	**6**	**6**
(South Africa) K Schimper	2	4
(United States) **B Nagelsen**	**6**	**6**
Q	(United States) J Thomas	3	1
7	(Soviet Union) **L Meskhi**	**6**	**6**
4	(Argentina) **B Fulco**	**6**	4	**7**
(United States) H Na	4	**6**	5
(Netherlands) M Bollegraf	3	4
(United States) **B Bowes**	**6**	**6**
(United States) **A Frazier**	**6**	**6**
(Soviet Union) S Parkhomenko	3	3
(United States) A Henricksson	6	3
6	(United States) **H Cioffi**	**7**	**6**
8	(South Africa) R Fairbank	1	2
(United States) **C Benjamin**	**6**	**6**
(United States) **S Sloane**	2	**6**	**7**
(United States) B Herr	**6**	3	5
(United States) **M Werdel**	**6**	**6**
Q	(United States) A Grousbeck	4	4
(United States) E Hakami	2	**6**	4
3	(Canada) **H Kelesi**	**6**	2	**6**
5	(Australia) **A Minter**	**6**	**6**
(United States) W White	2	4
(United States) **A Grossman**	**6**	**6**
(United States) M L Daniels	3	2
Q	(Canada) R Simpson	6	4
(Canada) **J Hetherington**	**7**	**6**
Q	(United States) K Kessaris	1	4
2	(United States) **L McNeil**	**6**	**6**

Second round
1	(United States) **B Potter**	**6**	**6**
(United States) K Rinaldi	4	1
(United States) B Nagelsen	5	**6**	5
7	(Soviet Union) **L Meskhi**	**7**	3	**7**
4	(Argentina) B Fulco	2	3
(United States) **B Bowes**	**6**	**6**
(United States) A Frazier	**6**	4	1
6	(United States) **H Cioffi**	3	**6**	**6**
(United States) C Benjamin	6	1	r
(United States) **S Sloane**	**7**	**4**
(United States) M Werdel	**6**	5	1
3	(Canada) **H Kelesi**	2	**7**	**6**
5	(Australia) A Minter	3	3
(United States) **A Grossman**	**6**	**6**
(Canada) J Hetherington	6	**6**	4
2	(United States) **L McNeil**	**7**	4	**6**

Quarterfinals
1	(United States) B Potter	**6**	2	3
7	(Soviet Union) **L Meskhi**	2	**6**	**6**
(United States) **B Bowes**	**6**	**6**
6	(United States) H Cioffi	1	0
(United States) **S Sloane**	**6**	**6**
3	(Canada) H Kelesi	1	3
(United States) A Grossman	6	1
2	(United States) **L McNeil**	**7**	**6**

Semifinals
7	(Soviet Union) L Meskhi	1	1
(United States) **B Bowes**	**6**	**6**
(United States) **S Sloane**	6	**6**	**6**
2	(United States) L McNeil	**7**	2	1

Final
(United States) Beverly Bowes	3	2
(United States) **Susan Sloane**	**6**	**6**
