= 1990 US Open – Women's doubles =

Women's doubles
- 1990 US Open

Final
- Champions: (United States) Gigi Fernández (United States) Martina Navratilova
- Runners-up: (Czechoslovakia) Jana Novotná (Czechoslovakia) Helena Suková
- Score: 6–2, 6–4

Details
- Draw: 64
- Seeds: 16

Events
Singles	men	women		boys	girls
Doubles	men	women	mixed	boys	girls
WC Singles	men	women	quad
WC Doubles	men	women	quad
Legends	men	women	mixed
- US Open

Defending champion Martina Navratilova and her partner Gigi Fernández defeated Jana Novotná and Helena Suková in the final, 6–2, 6–4 to win the women's doubles tennis title at the 1990 US Open. It was Navratilova's ninth US Open women's doubles title and 31st and final major women's doubles title overall, the latter an all-time record. Novotná and Suková were attempting to achieve the Calendar Grand Slam.

Hana Mandlíková and Navratilova were the reigning champions, but Mandlíková didn't compete that year.

== Seeds ==
Champion seeds are indicated in bold text while text in italics indicates the round in which those seeds were eliminated.

1. (Czechoslovakia) Jana Novotná / (Czechoslovakia) Helena Suková (final)
2. (United States) **Gigi Fernández** / (United States) **Martina Navratilova (champions)**
3. (Soviet Union) Larisa Savchenko / (Soviet Union) Natasha Zvereva (semifinals)
4. (United States) Kathy Jordan / (Australia) Elizabeth Smylie (semifinals)
5. (Spain) Arantxa Sánchez Vicario / (United States) Robin White (quarterfinals)
6. n/a
7. (United States) Patty Fendick / (United States) Zina Garrison (third round)
8. (Australia) Nicole Provis / (South Africa) Elna Reinach (quarterfinals)
9. (Argentina) Mercedes Paz / (Argentina) Gabriela Sabatini (quarterfinals)
10. (United States) Mary Lou Daniels / (United States) Wendy White-Prausa (third round)
11. (South Africa) Lise Gregory / (United States) Gretchen Magers (third round)
12. (United States) Elise Burgin / (United States) Rosalyn Fairbank-Nideffer (third round)
13. (Italy) Sandra Cecchini / (Argentina) Patricia Tarabini (third round)
14. (Soviet Union) Natalia Medvedeva / (Soviet Union) Leila Meskhi (quarterfinals)
15. (Netherlands) Manon Bollegraf / (Netherlands) Brenda Schultz (third round)
16. (United States) Katrina Adams / (Peru) Laura Gildemeister (third round)

== Draw ==
Key

- Q = Qualifier
- WC = Wild card
- LL = Lucky loser
- Alt = Alternate
- ITF = ITF entry
- PR = Protected ranking
- SR = Special ranking
- SE = Special exempt
- JE = Junior exempt
- JR = Junior Accelerator Programme entrant
- CO = College Accelerator Programme entrant
- NG = Next Gen Accelerator Program entrant
- w/o = Walkover
- r = Retired
- d = Defaulted

=== Finals ===
Semifinals
1	(Czechoslovakia) Jana Novotná (Czechoslovakia) Helena Suková	6	6
3	(Soviet Union) Larisa Savchenko (Soviet Union) Natasha Zvereva	2	3
4	(United States) Kathy Jordan (Australia) Elizabeth Smylie	4	5
2	(United States) Gigi Fernández (United States) Martina Navratilova	6	7

Final
1	(Czechoslovakia) Jana Novotná (Czechoslovakia) Helena Suková	2	4
2	(United States) Gigi Fernández (United States) Martina Navratilova	6	6

=== Top half ===
==== Section 1 ====
First round
1	(Czechoslovakia) J Novotná (Czechoslovakia) H Suková	6	6
(France) S Amiach (Canada) P Hy	4	2
(United States) E deLone (United States) L Raymond	3	6	6
(United States) T Phelps (United States) S Stafford	6	3	3
(Czechoslovakia) I Budařová (Czechoslovakia) L Lásková	1	1
(Italy) L Ferrando (Argentina) B Fulco	6	6
(Denmark) S Albinus (France) N van Lottum	1	2
15	(Netherlands) M Bollegraf (Netherlands) B Schultz	6	6
11	(South Africa) L Gregory (United States) G Magers	6	6
(United States) J Fuchs (Sweden) M Strandlund	3	4
(Sweden) M Lindström (United States) H Ludloff	7	6
(Italy) B Romanò (Czechoslovakia) E Švíglerová	5	2
(Australia) R McQuillan (Australia) J Tremelling	6^{3}	1
(Canada) H Kelesi (Socialist Federal Republic of Yugoslavia) M Seles	7^{7}	6
(United Kingdom) J Durie (New Zealand) J Richardson	5	4
5	(Spain) A Sánchez Vicario (United States) R White	7	6

Second round
1	(Czechoslovakia) J Novotná (Czechoslovakia) H Suková	6	6
(United States) E deLone (United States) L Raymond	0	0
(Italy) L Ferrando (Argentina) B Fulco	4	3
15	(Netherlands) M Bollegraf (Netherlands) B Schultz	6	6
11	(South Africa) L Gregory (United States) G Magers	1	7^{8}	7
(Sweden) M Lindström (United States) H Ludloff	6	6^{6}	5
(Canada) H Kelesi (Socialist Federal Republic of Yugoslavia) M Seles	1	3
5	(Spain) A Sánchez Vicario (United States) R White	6	6

Third round
1	(Czechoslovakia) J Novotná (Czechoslovakia) H Suková	6	6^{8}	6
15	(Netherlands) M Bollegraf (Netherlands) B Schultz	1	7^{10}	4
11	(South Africa) L Gregory (United States) G Magers	3	1
5	(Spain) A Sánchez Vicario (United States) R White	6	6

Quarterfinals
1	(Czechoslovakia) J Novotná (Czechoslovakia) H Suková	7^{9}	6
5	(Spain) A Sánchez Vicario (United States) R White	6^{7}	3

==== Section 2 ====
First round
3	(Soviet Union) L Savchenko (Soviet Union) N Zvereva	6	6
(West Germany) S Meier (Bulgaria) E Pampoulova	0	4
(Brazil) C Chabalgoity (Brazil) L Corsato	3	1
(Canada) J Hetherington (United States) K Rinaldi	6	6
(France) M Pierce (United States) L Spadea	2	7	6
(United States) Ca MacGregor (United States) H Na	6	5	0
(Soviet Union) E Brioukhovets (Soviet Union) E Maniokova	1	0
9	(Argentina) M Paz (Argentina) G Sabatini	6	6
14	(Soviet Union) N Medvedeva (Soviet Union) L Meskhi	6	6
(Czechoslovakia) P Langrová (Czechoslovakia) J Pospíšilová	3	1
(New Zealand) B Cordwell (United States) A Henricksson	7^{7}	6
(United States) S Collins (United States) J Smoller	6^{3}	4
(United States) S Birch (United States) D Graham	2	2
(West Germany) C Porwik (West Germany) W Probst	6	6
(United States) Cy MacGregor (United States) M Werdel	7^{9}	3	1
7	(United States) P Fendick (United States) Z Garrison	6^{7}	6	6

Second round
3	(Soviet Union) L Savchenko (Soviet Union) N Zvereva	6	5	6
(Canada) J Hetherington (United States) K Rinaldi	1	7	3
(France) M Pierce (United States) L Spadea	6	4	5
9	(Argentina) M Paz (Argentina) G Sabatini	4	6	7
14	(Soviet Union) N Medvedeva (Soviet Union) L Meskhi	6	6
(New Zealand) B Cordwell (United States) A Henricksson	4	2
(West Germany) C Porwik (West Germany) W Probst	5	5
7	(United States) P Fendick (United States) Z Garrison	7	7

Third round
3	(Soviet Union) L Savchenko (Soviet Union) N Zvereva	6^{5}	6	6
9	(Argentina) M Paz (Argentina) G Sabatini	7^{7}	4	4
14	(Soviet Union) N Medvedeva (Soviet Union) L Meskhi	w/o
7	(United States) P Fendick (United States) Z Garrison

Quarterfinals
3	(Soviet Union) L Savchenko (Soviet Union) N Zvereva	6	6^{5}	6
14	(Soviet Union) N Medvedeva (Soviet Union) L Meskhi	3	7^{7}	3

=== Bottom half ===
==== Section 3 ====
First round
ALT	(United States) K Foxworth (United States) T Whittington	4	1
(Australia) J Byrne (United States) A White	6	6
(West Germany) S Graf (United States) L McNeil	6	6
(United Kingdom) S Smith (Netherlands) H ter Riet	2	1
(Italy) L Garrone (Italy) L Golarsa	2	4
(Australia) J-A Faull (Australia) W Turnbull	6	6
(Austria) B Paulus (Czechoslovakia) R Zrubáková	4	2
13	(Italy) S Cecchini (Argentina) P Tarabini	6	6
12	(United States) E Burgin (United States) R Fairbank-Nideffer	6	6
(United States) P Barg-Mager (United States) P Louie-Harper	2	3
(United States) C Benjamin (Australia) A Minter	6	3	1
(United States) Ta Whitlinger (United States) Te Whitlinger	1	6	6
(France) N Tauziat (Austria) J Wiesner	6	6
(West Germany) K Kschwendt (Australia) T Morton	1	0
(France) P Paradis (France) C Suire	4	7	3
4	(United States) K Jordan (Australia) E Smylie	6	5	6

Second round
(Australia) J Byrne (United States) A White	6	5	6^{4}
(West Germany) S Graf (United States) L McNeil	4	7	7^{7}
(Australia) J-A Faull (Australia) W Turnbull	2	4
13	(Italy) S Cecchini (Argentina) P Tarabini	6	6
12	(United States) E Burgin (United States) R Fairbank-Nideffer	6	6
(United States) Ta Whitlinger (United States) Te Whitlinger	4	1
(France) N Tauziat (Austria) J Wiesner	2	3
4	(United States) K Jordan (Australia) E Smylie	6	6

Third round
(West Germany) S Graf (United States) L McNeil	6	2	6
13	(Italy) S Cecchini (Argentina) P Tarabini	3	6	0
12	(United States) E Burgin (United States) R Fairbank-Nideffer	1	6^{1}
4	(United States) K Jordan (Australia) E Smylie	6	7^{7}

Quarterfinals
(West Germany) S Graf (United States) L McNeil	2	7	1
4	(United States) K Jordan (Australia) E Smylie	6	5	6

==== Section 4 ====
First round
8	(Australia) N Provis (South Africa) E Reinach	6	6
(South Africa) R Field (New Zealand) C Toleafoa	1	0
(South Africa) L Barnard (South Africa) D van Rensburg	6	6
(Czechoslovakia) R Rajchrtová (Hungary) A Temesvári	3	1
(Italy) C Caverzasio (Argentina) F Labat	4	7^{7}	3
(United States) A Grossman (Australia) R Stubbs	6	6^{4}	6
(Japan) M Kidowaki (Japan) N Miyagi	5	4
10	(United States) M L Daniels (United States) W White-Prausa	7	6
16	(United States) K Adams (Peru) L Gildemeister	6	6^{5}	6
(Sweden) C Lindqvist (Australia) A Scott	2	7^{7}	4
(France) I Demongeot (West Germany) E Pfaff	7^{7}	6
(Bulgaria) M Maleeva (Switzerland) M Maleeva-Fragnière	6^{1}	3
(France) A Dechaume (France) N Herreman	6^{5}	4
(United States) H Cioffi (United States) A Frazier	7^{7}	6
(United States) J Capriati (United States) M McGrath	5	4
2	(United States) G Fernández (United States) M Navratilova	7	6

Second round
8	(Australia) N Provis (South Africa) E Reinach	6^{6}	6	6
(South Africa) L Barnard (South Africa) D van Rensburg	7^{8}	1	2
(United States) A Grossman (Australia) R Stubbs	6	4	4
10	(United States) M L Daniels (United States) W White-Prausa	2	6	6
16	(United States) K Adams (Peru) L Gildemeister	6	6
(France) I Demongeot (West Germany) E Pfaff	4	3
(United States) H Cioffi (United States) A Frazier	2	1
2	(United States) G Fernández (United States) M Navratilova	6	6

Third round
8	(Australia) N Provis (South Africa) E Reinach	6	6
10	(United States) M L Daniels (United States) W White-Prausa	4	3
16	(United States) K Adams (Peru) L Gildemeister	6	2	2
2	(United States) G Fernández (United States) M Navratilova	0	6	6

Quarterfinals
8	(Australia) N Provis (South Africa) E Reinach	6^{3}	6	0
2	(United States) G Fernández (United States) M Navratilova	7^{7}	4	6
