= 1990 Virginia Slims of Nashville =

- Date: October 29 – November 4
- Edition: 6th
- Category: Tier IV
- Draw: 32S / 16D
- Prize money: $150,000
- Surface: Hard / indoor
- Location: Brentwood, Tennessee, U.S.
- Venue: Maryland Farms Racquet Club

Champions

Singles
- (Soviet Union) Natalia Medvedeva

Doubles
- (United States) Kathy Jordan / (Soviet Union) Meredith McGrath
← 1989 ·	Virginia Slims of Nashville	· 1991 →

The 1990 Virginia Slims of Nashville was a women's tennis tournament played on indoor hard courts at the Maryland Farms Racquet Club in Brentwood, Tennessee, in the United States and was part of the Tier IV category of the 1990 WTA Tour. It was the sixth edition of the tournament and ran from October 29 through November 4, 1990. Unseeded Natalia Medvedeva won the singles title and earned $27,000 first-prize money.

== Finals ==
=== Singles ===
(Soviet Union) Natalia Medvedeva defeated (United States) Susan Sloane 6–3, 7–6^{(7–3)}

- It was Medvedeva's first singles title of her career.

=== Doubles ===
(United States) Kathy Jordan / (Soviet Union) Larisa Neiland defeated (Netherlands) Brenda Schultz / (Netherlands) Caroline Vis 6–1, 6–2
