= 1990 French Open – Mixed doubles =

Mixed doubles
- 1990 French Open

Final
- Champion: (Mexico) Jorge Lozano (Spain) Arantxa Sánchez Vicario
- Runner-up: (South Africa) Danie Visser (Australia) Nicole Provis
- Score: 7–6^{(7–5)}, 7–6^{(10–8)}

Details
- Draw: 64
- Seeds: 16

Events
Singles	men	women		boys	girls
Doubles	men	women	mixed	boys	girls
WC Singles	men	women	quad
WC Doubles	men	women	quad
Legends	−45	45+	women
- French Open

The mixed doubles tournament at the 1990 French Open was held from 28 May until 10 June 1990 on the outdoor clay courts at the Stade Roland Garros in Paris, France. Jorge Lozano and Arantxa Sánchez Vicario won the title, defeating Danie Visser and Nicole Provis in the final.

== Seeds ==
1. (South Africa) Pieter Aldrich / (South Africa) Elna Reinach (third round)
2. (South Africa) Danie Visser / (Australia) Nicole Provis (final)
3. (United States) Patrick McEnroe / (United States) Kathy Jordan (first round)
4. (Mexico) Jorge Lozano / (Spain) Arantxa Sánchez Vicario (champions)
5. (United States) Todd Witsken / (United States) Elise Burgin (first round)
6. (Czechoslovakia) Tomáš Šmíd / (Australia) Elizabeth Smylie (third round)
7. (Spain) Sergio Casal / (United States) Betsy Nagelsen (first round)
8. (United States) Robert Seguso / (United States) Lori McNeil (first round)
9. (Argentina) Gustavo Luza / (Argentina) Patricia Tarabini (second round)
10. (United States) Kelly Jones / (Soviet Union) Natalia Medvedeva (semifinals)
11. (Netherlands) Tom Nijssen / (Netherlands) Manon Bollegraf (second round)
12. (Argentina) Javier Frana / (Peru) Laura Gildemeister (third round)
13. (Australia) Laurie Warder / (United States) Penny Barg-Mager (first round)
14. (Iran) Mansour Bahrami / (France) Catherine Tanvier (second round)
15. (Brazil) Cássio Motta / (United States) Sandy Collins (first round)
16. (Netherlands) Michiel Schapers / (Netherlands) Brenda Schultz (quarterfinals)

== Draw ==
Key

- Q = Qualifier
- WC = Wild card
- LL = Lucky loser
- Alt = Alternate
- ITF = ITF entry
- PR = Protected ranking
- SR = Special ranking
- SE = Special exempt
- JE = Junior exempt
- JR = Junior Accelerator Programme entrant
- CO = College Accelerator Programme entrant
- NG = Next Gen Accelerator Program entrant
- w/o = Walkover
- r = Retired
- d = Defaulted

=== Finals ===
Quarterfinals
16	(Netherlands) Michiel Schapers (Netherlands) Brenda Schultz	2	3
10	(United States) Kelly Jones (Soviet Union) Natalia Medvedeva	6	6
4	(Mexico) Jorge Lozano (Spain) Arantxa Sánchez Vicario	6	6
(South Africa) Craig Campbell (France) Mary Pierce	1	1
(Australia) Simon Youl (Australia) Louise Field	6	6
(France) Olivier Delaître (France) Catherine Suire	3	2
(Denmark) Michael Mortensen (Denmark) Tine Scheuer-Larsen	5	4
2	(South Africa) Danie Visser (Australia) Nicole Provis	7	6

Semifinals
10	(United States) Kelly Jones (Soviet Union) Natalia Medvedeva	2	4
4	(Mexico) Jorge Lozano (Spain) Arantxa Sánchez Vicario	6	6
(Australia) Simon Youl (Australia) Louise Field	5	4
2	(South Africa) Danie Visser (Australia) Nicole Provis	7	6

Final
4	(Mexico) Jorge Lozano (Spain) Arantxa Sánchez Vicario	7	7
2	(South Africa) Danie Visser (Australia) Nicole Provis	6^{5}	6^{8}

=== Top half ===
==== Section 1 ====
First round
1	(South Africa) P Aldrich (South Africa) E Reinach	6	6
(United States) P Galbraith (United States) J Smoller	4
(Sweden) V Jansson (Sweden) M Lindström	3	3
(Brazil) L Mattar (Brazil) A Vieira	6	6
WC	(France) J Potier (France) P Etchemendy	6^{5}	6	6
WC	(France) R Gilbert (France) E Derly	7	3	1
(Czechoslovakia) L Pimek (Switzerland) E Krapl	0	5
16	(Netherlands) M Schapers (Netherlands) B Schultz	6	7
10	(United States) K Jones (Soviet Union) N Medvedeva	1	6	9
(South Africa) R Deppe (South Africa) D Van Rensburg	6	3	7
(Belgium) E Masso (Argentina) B Fulco	7	7
(Spain) F Clavet (Australia) A Scott	5	6^{6}
(Uruguay) D Pérez (Argentina) M Paz	6	7
(United States) C Beckman (Australia) R Stubbs	2	6^{2}
(Argentina) H de la Peña (Hungary) A Temesvári	6	7
7	(Spain) S Casal (United States) B Nagelsen	2	6^{7}

Second round
1	(South Africa) P Aldrich (South Africa) E Reinach	7	7
(Brazil) L Mattar (Brazil) A Vieira	6^{4}	5
WC	(France) J Potier (France) P Etchemendy
16	(Netherlands) M Schapers (Netherlands) B Schultz	w/o
10	(United States) K Jones (Soviet Union) N Medvedeva	6	6
(Belgium) E Masso (Argentina) B Fulco	4	4
(Uruguay) D Pérez (Argentina) M Paz	2	7	6
(Argentina) H de la Peña (Hungary) A Temesvári	6	5	3

Third round
1	(South Africa) P Aldrich (South Africa) E Reinach	5	6	5
16	(Netherlands) M Schapers (Netherlands) B Schultz	7	3	7
10	(United States) K Jones (Soviet Union) N Medvedeva	4	6	6
(Uruguay) D Pérez (Argentina) M Paz	6	2	2

Quarterfinals
16	(Netherlands) M Schapers (Netherlands) B Schultz	2	3
10	(United States) K Jones (Soviet Union) N Medvedeva	6	6

==== Section 2 ====
First round
4	(Mexico) J Lozano (Spain) A Sánchez Vicario	6	6
(Netherlands) M Koevermans (Netherlands) H ter Riet	3	1
(Soviet Union) A Cherkasov (Soviet Union) L Savchenko	6	2	1
(Australia) J Stoltenberg (Australia) JA Faull	0	6	6
(Venezuela) A González Mora (United States) Cy MacGregor	6	3	11
(France) T Benhabiles (France) N Herreman	2	6	13
(Australia) T Woodbridge (Australia) R McQuillan	6	6
13	(Australia) L Warder (United States) P Barg-Mager	3	2
11	(Netherlands) T Nijssen (Netherlands) M Bollegraf	7	4	6
(United States) T Nelson (United States) G Magers	6^{5}	6	1
(South Africa) C Campbell (France) M Pierce	6	6
(South Africa) L Bale (South Africa) R Fairbank-Nideffer	2	1
(Netherlands) P Haarhuis (Netherlands) C Bakkum	5	6	6
(Argentina) P Albano (Argentina) F Labat	7	3	3
(Soviet Union) Ģ Dzelde (Soviet Union) L Meskhi	6^{5}	4
6	(Czechoslovakia) T Šmíd (Australia) E Smylie	7	6

Second round
4	(Mexico) J Lozano (Spain) A Sánchez Vicario	6	6
(Australia) J Stoltenberg (Australia) JA Faull	4	1
(France) T Benhabiles (France) N Herreman	7	4	5
(Australia) T Woodbridge (Australia) R McQuillan	6^{1}	6	7
11	(Netherlands) T Nijssen (Netherlands) M Bollegraf	6^{5}	4
(South Africa) C Campbell (France) M Pierce	7	6
(Netherlands) P Haarhuis (Netherlands) C Bakkum	1	4
6	(Czechoslovakia) T Šmíd (Australia) E Smylie	6	6

Third round
4	(Mexico) J Lozano (Spain) A Sánchez Vicario	6	1	6
(Australia) T Woodbridge (Australia) R McQuillan	1	6	1
(South Africa) C Campbell (France) M Pierce	6	6
6	(Czechoslovakia) T Šmíd (Australia) E Smylie	2	2

Quarterfinals
4	(Mexico) J Lozano (Spain) A Sánchez Vicario	6	6
(South Africa) C Campbell (France) M Pierce	1	1

=== Bottom half ===
==== Section 3 ====
First round
5	(United States) T Witsken (United States) E Burgin	1	6^{5}
(Australia) S Youl (Australia) L Field	6	7
(United States) J Sobel (South Africa) L Gregory	3	5
WC	(United States) S Stewart (United States) Z Garrison	6	7
WC	(France) É Winogradsky (France) S Testud	6	7
(United States) G Van Emburgh (United States) Ca MacGregor	3	5
(United States) K Kinnear (South Africa) R Field	4	7	4
12	(Argentina) J Frana (Peru) L Gildemeister	6	5	6
14	(Iran) M Bahrami (France) C Tanvier	6	7
(Australia) D Macpherson (Australia) J Byrne	4	6^{2}
(France) O Delaître (France) C Suire	6	6
(United States) B Shelton (United States) C Benjamin	2	2
(New Zealand) B Derlin (Australia) J Thompson	w/o
(Brazil) N Aerts (Italy) L Ferrando
(Australia) B Dyke (Australia) M Jaggard	4	6	7
3	(United States) P McEnroe (United States) K Jordan	6	4	5

Second round
(Australia) S Youl (Australia) L Field	6	6
WC	(United States) S Stewart (United States) Z Garrison	3	2
WC	(France) É Winogradsky (France) S Testud	1	3
12	(Argentina) J Frana (Peru) L Gildemeister	6	6
14	(Iran) M Bahrami (France) C Tanvier	3	4
(France) O Delaître (France) C Suire	6	6
(New Zealand) B Derlin (Australia) J Thompson
(Australia) B Dyke (Australia) M Jaggard	w/o

Third round
(Australia) S Youl (Australia) L Field	6	6
12	(Argentina) J Frana (Peru) L Gildemeister	3	2
(France) O Delaître (France) C Suire	6	6
(Australia) B Dyke (Australia) M Jaggard	3	2

Quarterfinals
(Australia) S Youl (Australia) L Field	6	6
(France) O Delaître (France) C Suire	3	2

==== Section 4 ====
First round
8	(United States) R Seguso (United States) L McNeil	2	3
(Denmark) M Mortensen (Denmark) T Scheuer-Larsen	6	6
(South Africa) S Kruger (United States) B Bowes	3	4
(The Bahamas) R Smith (United States) K Adams	6	6
(United States) T Pawsat (United States) B Herr	6	6^{7}	6
(Brazil) F Roese (Brazil) L Corsato	4	7	3
(United States) L Jensen (United States) T Phelps	2	5
9	(Argentina) G Luza (Argentina) P Tarabini	6	7
15	(Brazil) C Motta (United States) S Collins	4	4
(United States) K Flach (Canada) C Bassett-Seguso	6	6
(Czechoslovakia) T Anzari (Czechoslovakia) P Langrová	4	6	1
(United States) T Wilkison (United States) S Stafford	6	1	6
WC	(France) G Raoux (France) K Quentrec	1	5
(Italy) D Nargiso (United States) A Grousbeck	6	7
WC	(France) A Boetsch (France) N van Lottum	2	3
2	(South Africa) D Visser (Australia) N Provis	6	6

Second round
(Denmark) M Mortensen (Denmark) T Scheuer-Larsen	7	6
(The Bahamas) R Smith (United States) K Adams	6^{2}	4
(United States) T Pawsat (United States) B Herr	7	6
9	(Argentina) G Luza (Argentina) P Tarabini	5	2
(United States) K Flach (Canada) C Bassett-Seguso	6	6
(United States) T Wilkison (United States) S Stafford	4	2
(Italy) D Nargiso (United States) A Grousbeck	1	4
2	(South Africa) D Visser (Australia) N Provis	6	6

Third round
(Denmark) M Mortensen (Denmark) T Scheuer-Larsen	6	6
(United States) T Pawsat (United States) B Herr	3	3
(United States) K Flach (Canada) C Bassett-Seguso	6	5	3
2	(South Africa) D Visser (Australia) N Provis	4	7	6

Quarterfinals
(Denmark) M Mortensen (Denmark) T Scheuer-Larsen	5	4
2	(South Africa) D Visser (Australia) N Provis	7	6
