= 1991 Virginia Slims of Nashville – Doubles =

Doubles
- 1991 Virginia Slims of Nashville

Final
- Champions: (United States) Sandy Collins (South Africa) Elna Reinach
- Runners-up: (Indonesia) Yayuk Basuki (Netherlands) Caroline Vis
- Score: 5–7, 6–4, 7–6^{(9–7)}

Details
- Draw: 16
- Seeds: 4

Events
Singles	Doubles
← 1990 ·	Virginia Slims of Nashville

Kathy Jordan and Larisa Neiland were the defending champions, but none competed this year.

Sandy Collins and Elna Reinach won the title by defeating Yayuk Basuki and Caroline Vis 5–7, 6–4, 7–6^{(9–7)} in the final.

== Seeds ==
1. (Canada) Jill Hetherington / (United States) Kathy Rinaldi (quarterfinals)
2. (Australia) Nicole Provis / (Australia) Elizabeth Smylie (quarterfinals)
3. (United States) Katrina Adams / (Netherlands) Manon Bollegraf (quarterfinals)
4. (United States) Sandy Collins / (South Africa) Elna Reinach (champions)

== Draw ==
=== Key ===
- Q = Qualifier
- WC = Wild card
- LL = Lucky loser
- Alt = Alternate
- SE = Special exempt
- PR = Protected ranking
- ITF = ITF entry
- JE = Junior exempt
- w/o = Walkover
- r = Retired
- d = Defaulted
- SR = Special ranking

=== Draw ===
First round
1	(Canada) J Hetherington (United States) K Rinaldi	6	6
(France) I Demongeot (Spain) C Martínez	3	3
Q	(United States) N Arendt (United States) A Gooden	3	6^{5}
(Soviet Union) E Brioukhovets (Soviet Union) N Medvedeva	6	7^{7}
3	(United States) K Adams (Netherlands) M Bollegraf	6	6
(Czechoslovakia) K Habšudová (Czechoslovakia) D Szabová	2	2
(United States) L Allen (Czechoslovakia) E Švíglerová	3	5
(Indonesia) Y Basuki (Netherlands) C Vis	6	7
(United States) ML Daniels (United States) A Henricksson	4	2
(Czechoslovakia) P Langrová (Czechoslovakia) R Zrubáková	6	6
(United States) C Benjamin (United States) W Prausa	6^{2}	2
4	(United States) S Collins (South Africa) E Reinach	7^{7}	6
(United States) C Cunningham (Japan) M Kidowaki	6	3	6
(South Africa) A Coetzer (United States) S Sloane-Lundy	2	6	3
(West Germany) E Pfaff (West Germany) C Porwik	4	3
2	(Australia) N Provis (Australia) E Smylie	6	6

Quarterfinals
1	(Canada) J Hetherington (United States) K Rinaldi	2	6	6^{1}
(Soviet Union) E Brioukhovets (Soviet Union) N Medvedeva	6	2	7^{7}
3	(United States) K Adams (Netherlands) M Bollegraf	5	3
(Indonesia) Y Basuki (Netherlands) C Vis	7	6
(Czechoslovakia) P Langrová (Czechoslovakia) R Zrubáková	5	0
4	(United States) S Collins (South Africa) E Reinach	7	6
(United States) C Cunningham (Japan) M Kidowaki	6	6
2	(Australia) N Provis (Australia) E Smylie	2	2

Semifinals
(Soviet Union) E Brioukhovets (Soviet Union) N Medvedeva	6	1	5
(Indonesia) Y Basuki (Netherlands) C Vis	4	6	7
4	(United States) S Collins (South Africa) E Reinach	6	6
(United States) C Cunningham (Japan) M Kidowaki	4	1

Final
(Indonesia) Y Basuki (Netherlands) C Vis	7	4	6^{7}
4	(United States) S Collins (South Africa) E Reinach	5	6	7^{9}
