= 1990 US Open – Women's singles =

Women's singles
- 1990 US Open

Final
- Champion: (Argentina) Gabriela Sabatini
- Runner-up: (West Germany) Steffi Graf
- Score: 6–2, 7–6^{(7–4)}

Details
- Draw: 128
- Seeds: 16

Events
Singles	men	women		boys	girls
Doubles	men	women	mixed	boys	girls
WC Singles	men	women	quad
WC Doubles	men	women	quad
Legends	men	women	mixed
← 1989 ·	US Open	· 1991 →

Gabriela Sabatini defeated two-time defending champion Steffi Graf in the final, 6–2, 7–6^{(7–4)} to win the women's singles tennis title at the 1990 US Open. It was her first and only major singles title. The final was a rematch of the 1988 final and the 1989 semifinals, both won by Graf.

== Seeds ==
The seeded players are listed below. Sabatini is the champion; others show the round in which they were eliminated.

1. (West Germany) Steffi Graf (final)
2. (United States) Martina Navratilova (fourth round)
3. (Socialist Federal Republic of Yugoslavia) Monica Seles (third round)
4. (United States) Zina Garrison (quarterfinals)
5. (Argentina) Gabriela Sabatini (champion)
6. (Spain) Arantxa Sánchez Vicario (semifinals)
7. (Bulgaria) Katerina Maleeva (fourth round)
8. (United States) Mary Joe Fernández (semifinals)
9. (Switzerland) Manuela Maleeva-Fragnière (quarterfinals)
10. (Spain) Conchita Martínez (third round)
11. (Czechoslovakia) Helena Suková (fourth round)
12. (Czechoslovakia) Jana Novotná (quarterfinals)
13. (United States) Jennifer Capriati (fourth round)
14. (Soviet Union) Natasha Zvereva (second round)
15. (Austria) Judith Wiesner (fourth round)
16. (Austria) Barbara Paulus (fourth round)

== Draw ==
=== Key ===
- Q = Qualifier
- WC = Wild card
- LL = Lucky loser
- Alt = Alternate
- ITF = ITF entry
- PR = Protected ranking
- SR = Special ranking
- SE = Special exempt
- JE = Junior exempt
- JR = Junior Accelerator Programme entrant
- CO = College Accelerator Programme entrant
- NG = Next Gen Accelerator Program entrant
- w/o = Walkover
- r = Retired
- d = Defaulted

=== Finals ===
Quarterfinals
1	(West Germany) Steffi Graf	6	6
12	(Czechoslovakia) Jana Novotná	3	1
4	(United States) Zina Garrison	2	2
6	(Spain) Arantxa Sánchez Vicario	6	6
5	(Argentina) Gabriela Sabatini	7^{7}	6
(Soviet Union) Leila Meskhi	6^{5}	4
8	(United States) Mary Joe Fernández	6	2	6
9	(Switzerland) Manuela Maleeva-Fragnière	2	6	1

Semifinals
1	(West Germany) Steffi Graf	6	6
6	(Spain) Arantxa Sánchez Vicario	1	2
5	(Argentina) Gabriela Sabatini	7	5	6
8	(United States) Mary Joe Fernández	5	7	3

Final
1	(West Germany) Steffi Graf	2	6^{4}
5	(Argentina) Gabriela Sabatini	6	7^{7}

=== Top half ===
==== Section 1 ====
First round
1	(West Germany) S Graf	6	6
Q	(Canada) M Drake	1	1
(United States) L Harvey-Wild	6^{5}	5
(Australia) R McQuillan	7^{7}	7
(France) A Dechaume	6	6
(Italy) F Bonsignori	2	1
(West Germany) S Hack	1	2
(South Africa) E Reinach	6	6
(United States) G Magers	2	1
(Netherlands) M Bollegraf	6	6
(Sweden) M Strandlund	4	6	6
WC	(United States) B Bowes	6	1	2
(Canada) P Hy	6	6
(Italy) L Golarsa	3	3
(West Germany) A Huber	5	5
13	(United States) J Capriati	7	7

Second round
1	(West Germany) S Graf	6	6
(Australia) R McQuillan	1	3
(France) A Dechaume	3	0
(South Africa) E Reinach	6	6
(Netherlands) M Bollegraf	6	1	5
(Sweden) M Strandlund	4	6	7
(Canada) P Hy	3	1
13	(United States) J Capriati	6	6

Third round
1	(West Germany) S Graf	6	3	6
(South Africa) E Reinach	4	6	1
(Sweden) M Strandlund	1	4
13	(United States) J Capriati	6	6

Fourth round
1	(West Germany) S Graf	6	6
13	(United States) J Capriati	1	2

==== Section 2 ====
First round
12	(Czechoslovakia) J Novotná	6	6
(Italy) L Lapi	3	1
(Argentina) F Labat	4	6	3
(United States) K Rinaldi	6	4	6
(Peru) L Gildemeister	7	6
(United States) M McGrath	5	3
(Japan) N Sawamatsu	6	6
(Argentina) P Tarabini	1	3
(France) N Herreman	1	6	6^{5}
(Italy) R Reggi	6	4	7^{7}
(Belgium) S Wasserman	1	6	6
Q	(United States) A Farley	6	3	3
(United States) L Raymond	2	3
Q	(West Germany) K Kschwendt	6	6
(Bulgaria) M Maleeva	3	1
7	(Bulgaria) K Maleeva	6	6

Second round
12	(Czechoslovakia) J Novotná	6	6
(United States) K Rinaldi	4	3
(Peru) L Gildemeister	7	6
(Japan) N Sawamatsu	5	3
(Italy) R Reggi	6	6
(Belgium) S Wasserman	2	2
Q	(West Germany) K Kschwendt	5	1
7	(Bulgaria) K Maleeva	7	6

Third round
12	(Czechoslovakia) J Novotná	6	6
(Peru) L Gildemeister	3	1
(Italy) R Reggi	4	0
7	(Bulgaria) K Maleeva	6	6

Fourth round
12	(Czechoslovakia) J Novotná	6	6
7	(Bulgaria) K Maleeva	4	2

==== Section 3 ====
First round
4	(United States) Z Garrison	6	6
(Austria) B Reinstadler	1	3
(United States) D Faber	3	2
(Mexico) A Gavaldón	6	6
WC	(United States) J Santrock	1	1
(United Kingdom) M Javer	6	6
(West Germany) S Meier	6	2	5
(West Germany) C Porwik	4	6	2^{r}
(Sweden) C Dahlman	5	2
(France) N Tauziat	7	6
(Switzerland) E Zardo	6	4	6
(Italy) C Caverzasio	1	6	1
WC	(United States) E Burgin	4	6	4
(Hungary) C Bartos	6	4	6
(United States) M Werdel	6	5	2
10	(Spain) C Martínez	2	7	6

Second round
4	(United States) Z Garrison	6	6
(Mexico) A Gavaldón	4	0
(United Kingdom) M Javer	5	5
(West Germany) S Meier	7	7
(France) N Tauziat	6	4	6
(Switzerland) E Zardo	4	6	2
(Hungary) C Bartos	0	4
10	(Spain) C Martínez	6	6

Third round
4	(United States) Z Garrison	6	6
(West Germany) S Meier	4	3
(France) N Tauziat	6	6
10	(Spain) C Martínez	2	1

Fourth round
4	(United States) Z Garrison	6	7
(France) N Tauziat	1	5

==== Section 4 ====
First round
16	(Austria) B Paulus	7	6
(Australia) E Smylie	5	1
(United States) L McNeil	6	6
(United States) A Keller	4	3
(United States) M Louie-Harper	6	4	4
(United States) A Grossman	2	6	6
(New Zealand) B Cordwell	6	7^{7}
(United States) K Adams	3	6^{2}
(Czechoslovakia) R Zrubáková	7	6
(United States) T Whitlinger	5	2
(United States) P Fendick	6^{5}	6	7
(Japan) M Kidowaki	7^{7}	4	5
(United States) C Kuhlman	6	6
(United States) C Rubin	2	4
(Australia) N Provis	0	3
6	(Spain) A Sánchez Vicario	6	6

Second round
16	(Austria) B Paulus	6	4	6
(United States) L McNeil	2	6	4
(United States) A Grossman	6	6
(New Zealand) B Cordwell	2	3
(Czechoslovakia) R Zrubáková	2	3
(United States) P Fendick	6	6
(United States) C Kuhlman	1	2
6	(Spain) A Sánchez Vicario	6	6

Third round
16	(Austria) B Paulus	6	6
(United States) A Grossman	4	3
(United States) P Fendick	2	1
6	(Spain) A Sánchez Vicario	6	6

Fourth round
16	(Austria) B Paulus	4	3
6	(Spain) A Sánchez Vicario	6	6

=== Bottom half ===
==== Section 5 ====
First round
5	(Argentina) G Sabatini	6	6
WC	(United States) K Jordan	1	1
(France) I Demongeot	6	6
Q	(United States) S Collins	3	3
(Sweden) C Lindqvist	4	7^{8}	4
(Belgium) S Appelmans	6	6^{6}	6
(United States) A Leand	0	2
(West Germany) W Probst	6	6
(South Africa) A Coetzer	5	6	3
(Canada) H Kelesi	7	4	6
(United States) S Stafford	6	6
(Australia) A Minter	1	3
(United States) G Fernández	4	6^{5}
(Italy) L Garrone	6	7^{7}
(United Kingdom) J Durie	6	6^{3}	6^{5}
11	(Czechoslovakia) H Suková	1	7^{7}	7^{7}

Second round
5	(Argentina) G Sabatini	6	6
(France) I Demongeot	1	1
(Belgium) S Appelmans	6	6
(West Germany) W Probst	4	4
(Canada) H Kelesi	6	3	5
(United States) S Stafford	4	6	7
(Italy) L Garrone	3	0
11	(Czechoslovakia) H Suková	6	6

Third round
5	(Argentina) G Sabatini	6	6
(Belgium) S Appelmans	2	4
(United States) S Stafford	5	1
11	(Czechoslovakia) H Suková	7	6

Fourth round
5	(Argentina) G Sabatini	6	6
11	(Czechoslovakia) H Suková	2	1

==== Section 6 ====
First round
14	(Soviet Union) N Zvereva	6
(France) K Quentrec	1^{r}
(Soviet Union) L Meskhi	6	6
LL	(Japan) A Kijimuta	4	2
(Czechoslovakia) J Pospíšilová	3	1
(Italy) A-M Cecchini	6	6
(Greece) A Kanellopoulou	6^{3}	3
(Italy) K Piccolini	7^{7}	6
WC	(United States) C Benjamin	6^{2}	6	6
(Japan) N Miyagi	7^{7}	3	2
(Italy) L Ferrando	6	2	7^{7}
(Argentina) M Paz	4	6	6^{2}
(Czechoslovakia) P Langrová	6	1	2
(South Africa) R Fairbank-Nideffer	3	6	6
(Bulgaria) E Pampoulova	0	0
3	(Socialist Federal Republic of Yugoslavia) M Seles	6	6

Second round
14	(Soviet Union) N Zvereva	4	0
(Soviet Union) L Meskhi	6	6
(Italy) A-M Cecchini	6	5	4
(Italy) K Piccolini	4	7	6
WC	(United States) C Benjamin	6^{3}	2
(Italy) L Ferrando	7^{7}	6
(South Africa) R Fairbank-Nideffer	2	2
3	(Socialist Federal Republic of Yugoslavia) M Seles	6	6

Third round
(Soviet Union) L Meskhi	6	4	7^{7}
(Italy) K Piccolini	2	6	6^{2}
(Italy) L Ferrando	1	6	7^{7}
3	(Socialist Federal Republic of Yugoslavia) M Seles	6	1	6^{3}

Fourth round
(Soviet Union) L Meskhi	7^{7}	6
(Italy) L Ferrando	6^{4}	1

==== Section 7 ====
First round
8	(United States) MJ Fernandez	6	6
(United States) A Henricksson	1	1
Q	(Netherlands) M Oremans	6	3	6
(United States) S Martin	3	6	2
(Netherlands) B Schultz	2	4
(France) J Halard	6	6
(United States) R White	4	6	6
(Hungary) A Temesvári	6	0	2
(Czechoslovakia) R Rajchrtová	3	6	3
(Soviet Union) L Neiland	6	1	6
WC	(United States) W White-Prausa	1	6	3
(United States) C Cunningham	6	1	6
WC	(United States) C Macgregor	0	3
(Japan) K Date	6	6
(United States) M-L Daniels	3	1
15	(Austria) J Wiesner	6	6

Second round
8	(United States) MJ Fernandez	6	6
Q	(Netherlands) M Oremans	4	1
(France) J Halard	4	3
(United States) R White	6	6
(Soviet Union) L Neiland	6	6
(United States) C Cunningham	4	4
(Japan) K Date	6^{5}	1
15	(Austria) J Wiesner	7^{7}	6

Third round
8	(United States) MJ Fernandez	6	6
(United States) R White	1	2
(Soviet Union) L Neiland	1	3
15	(Austria) J Wiesner	6	6

Fourth round
8	(United States) MJ Fernandez	6	6
15	(Austria) J Wiesner	3	2

==== Section 8 ====
First round
9	(Switzerland) M Maleeva-Fragnière	6	6
(United States) A Frazier	1	3
WC	(United States) D Graham	6	6
Q	(United States) E Rossides	4	0
(West Germany) S Hanika	6	1	6
(Argentina) B Fulco	3	6	4
(South Africa) D Van Rensburg	6	6
(Czechoslovakia) E Švíglerová	3	1
(United States) S Sloane	6^{8}	3
(United States) H Cioffi	7^{10}	6
(United States) T Phelps	4	2
(Soviet Union) N Medvedeva	6	6
Q	(Poland) R Baranski	0	0
Q	(United Kingdom) C Wood	6	6
(Argentina) F Haumüller	4	0
2	(United States) M Navratilova	6	6

Second round
9	(Switzerland) M Maleeva-Fragnière	6	6
WC	(United States) D Graham	0	2
(West Germany) S Hanika	3	6	3
(South Africa) D Van Rensburg	6	3	6
(United States) H Cioffi	7	6
(Soviet Union) N Medvedeva	5	2
Q	(United Kingdom) C Wood	0	4
2	(United States) M Navratilova	6	6

Third round
9	(Switzerland) M Maleeva-Fragnière	6	6
(South Africa) D Van Rensburg	1	0
(United States) H Cioffi	2	2
2	(United States) M Navratilova	6	6

Fourth round
9	(Switzerland) M Maleeva-Fragnière	7	3	6
2	(United States) M Navratilova	5	6	3

Preceded by 1990 Wimbledon Championships – Women's singles	Grand Slam women's singles	Succeeded by 1991 Australian Open – Women's singles
