= 1988 Virginia Slims of Nashville =

- Date: October 17–23
- Edition: 4th
- Category: Category 2
- Draw: 32S / 16D
- Prize money: $100,000
- Surface: Hard / indoor
- Location: Brentwood, Tennessee, U.S.
- Venue: Maryland Farms Racquet Club

Champions

Singles
- (United States) Susan Sloane

Doubles
- (Australia) Jenny Byrne / (Australia) Janine Tremelling
- Virginia Slims of Nashville

The 1988 Virginia Slims of Nashville was a women's tennis tournament played on indoor hard courts at the Maryland Farms Racquet Club in Brentwood, Tennessee in the United States and was part of Category 2 tier of the 1988 WTA Tour. It was the fourth edition of the tournament and ran from October 17 through October 23, 1988. Unseeded Susan Sloane won the singles title and earned $17,000 first-prize money.

== Finals ==
=== Singles ===
(United States) Susan Sloane defeated (United States) Beverly Bowes 6–3, 6–2

- It was Sloane's only title of the year and the 1st of her career.

=== Doubles ===
(Australia) Jenny Byrne / (Australia) Janine Thompson defeated (United States) Elise Burgin / (South Africa) Rosalyn Fairbank 7–5, 6–7^{(1–7)}, 6–4

- It was Byrne's only title of the year and the 2nd of her career. It was Tremelling's only title of the year and the 2nd of her career.
