= 1988 Virginia Slims of Nashville – Doubles =

Doubles
- 1988 Virginia Slims of Nashville

Final
- Champions: (Australia) Jenny Byrne (Australia) Janine Tremelling
- Runners-up: (United States) Elise Burgin (South Africa) Rosalyn Fairbank
- Score: 7–5, 6–7^{(1–7)}, 6–4

Events
Singles	Doubles
- Virginia Slims of Nashville

Jenny Byrne and Janine Tremelling won in the final 7–5, 6–7^{(1–7)}, 6–4 against Elise Burgin and Rosalyn Fairbank.

== Seeds ==
Champion seeds are indicated in bold text while text in italics indicates the round in which those seeds were eliminated.

1. (United States) Lori McNeil / (United States) Betsy Nagelsen (semifinals)
2. (United States) Elise Burgin / (South Africa) Rosalyn Fairbank (final)
3. (Soviet Union) Leila Meskhi / (Soviet Union) Svetlana Parkhomenko (first round)
4. (United States) Beth Herr / (United States) Candy Reynolds (quarterfinals)

== Draw ==
Key

- Q = Qualifier
- WC = Wild card
- LL = Lucky loser
- Alt = Alternate
- ITF = ITF entry
- PR = Protected ranking
- SR = Special ranking
- SE = Special exempt
- JE = Junior exempt
- JR = Junior Accelerator Programme entrant
- CO = College Accelerator Programme entrant
- NG = Next Gen Accelerator Program entrant
- w/o = Walkover
- r = Retired
- d = Defaulted

First round
1	(United States) **L McNeil** (United States) **B Nagelsen**	**6**	**7^{7}**
(United States) L Allen (United States) W White	3	6^{4}
(United States) B Bowes (United States) H Na	**6**	4	5
(Soviet Union) **N Bykova** (United States) **J Kaplan**	2	**6**	**7**
3	(Soviet Union) L Meskhi (Soviet Union) S Parkhomenko	2	3
(Australia) **J Byrne** (Australia) **J Tremelling**	**6**	**6**
Q	(Australia) A Scott (United States) M Van Nostrand	**6**	5	3
(United States) **A Henricksson** (Canada) **H Kelesi**	1	**7**	**6**
(United States) **Ca MacGregor** (United States) **Cy MacGregor**	**6**	**6**
(United States) M L Daniels (United States) P Smith	1	2
(United States) C Benjamin (Australia) M Jaggard	6^{6}	2
4	(United States) **B Herr** (United States) **C Reynolds**	**7^{8}**	**6**
WC	(United States) C Davis (United States) Ms. Speakman	1	0
(Netherlands) **M Bollegraf** (South Africa) **L Gregory**	**6**	**6**
(Argentina) B Fulco (Argentina) A Villagrán	4	1
2	(United States) **E Burgin** (South Africa) **R Fairbank**	**6**	**6**

Quarterfinals
1	(United States) **L McNeil** (United States) **B Nagelsen**	**6**	2	**6**
(Soviet Union) N Bykova (United States) J Kaplan	3	**6**	2
(Australia) **J Byrne** (Australia) **J Tremelling**	**7^{7}**	**6**
(United States) A Henricksson (Canada) H Kelesi	6^{4}	3
(United States) **Ca MacGregor** (United States) **Cy MacGregor**	**7**	**7**
4	(United States) B Herr (United States) C Reynolds	5	5
(Netherlands) M Bollegraf (South Africa) L Gregory	3	2
2	(United States) **E Burgin** (South Africa) **R Fairbank**	**6**	**6**

Semifinals
1	(United States) L McNeil (United States) B Nagelsen	**6**	6^{4}	4
(Australia) **J Byrne** (Australia) **J Tremelling**	1	**7^{7}**	**6**
(United States) Ca MacGregor (United States) Cy MacGregor	5	1
2	(United States) **E Burgin** (South Africa) **R Fairbank**	**7**	**6**

Final
(Australia) **Jenny Byrne** (Australia) **Janine Tremelling**	**7**	6^{1}	**6**
2	(United States) Elise Burgin (South Africa) Rosalyn Fairbank	5	**7^{7}**	4
