= 1990 US Open – Mixed doubles =

Mixed doubles
- 1990 US Open

Final
- Champions: (Australia) Elizabeth Smylie (Australia) Todd Woodbridge
- Runners-up: (Soviet Union) Natasha Zvereva (United States) Jim Pugh
- Score: 6–4, 6–2

Details
- Draw: 32
- Seeds: 8

Events
Singles	men	women		boys	girls
Doubles	men	women	mixed	boys	girls
WC Singles	men	women	quad
WC Doubles	men	women	quad
Legends	men	women	mixed
- US Open

Robin White and Shelby Cannon were the defending champions but lost in the second round to Zina Garrison and Rick Leach.

Elizabeth Smylie and Todd Woodbridge won in the final 6–4, 6–2 against Natasha Zvereva and Jim Pugh.

== Seeds ==
Champion seeds are indicated in bold text while text in italics indicates the round in which those seeds were eliminated.

1. (Soviet Union) Natasha Zvereva / (United States) Jim Pugh (final)
2. (United States) Zina Garrison / (United States) Rick Leach (quarterfinals)
3. (South Africa) Elna Reinach / (South Africa) Pieter Aldrich (quarterfinals)
4. (Australia) Nicole Provis / (South Africa) Danie Visser (first round)
5. (Spain) Arantxa Sánchez Vicario / (Mexico) Jorge Lozano (quarterfinals)
6. (United States) Betsy Nagelsen / (United States) Scott Davis (withdrew)
7. (United States) Patty Fendick / (United States) Ken Flach (first round)
8. (Australia) **Elizabeth Smylie** / (Australia) **Todd Woodbridge (champions)**

== Draw ==
Key

- Q = Qualifier
- WC = Wild card
- LL = Lucky loser
- Alt = Alternate
- ITF = ITF entry
- PR = Protected ranking
- SR = Special ranking
- SE = Special exempt
- JE = Junior exempt
- JR = Junior Accelerator Programme entrant
- CO = College Accelerator Programme entrant
- NG = Next Gen Accelerator Program entrant
- w/o = Walkover
- r = Retired
- d = Defaulted

=== Final ===
Final
1	(Soviet Union) Natasha Zvereva (United States) Jim Pugh	4	2
8	(Australia) **Elizabeth Smylie** (Australia) **Todd Woodbridge**	**6**	**6**

=== Top half ===
First round
1	(Soviet Union) **N Zvereva** (United States) **J Pugh**	**6**	**7^{7}**
(United States) A Frazier (United States) M Davis	1	6^{4}
(United States) M L Daniels (United States) R Van't Hof	5	**6**	4
(Soviet Union) **N Medvedeva** (United States) **K Jones**	**7**	4	**6**
(Netherlands) **M Bollegraf** (Denmark) **M Mortensen**	**7**	**6**
(United States) W White-Prausa (United States) K Kinnear	5	2
(United States) **E Burgin** (Australia) **L Warder**	6^{5}	**7^{7}**	4
7	(United States) P Fendick (United States) K Flach	**7^{7}**	6^{4}	2r
4	(Australia) N Provis (South Africa) D Visser	4	6^{7}
(United States) **M McGrath** (Australia) **M Woodforde**	**6**	**7^{9}**
(United States) **G Magers** (United States) **T Nelson**	**6**	**7^{7}**
(South Africa) L Gregory (South Africa) S Kruger	3	6^{5}
ALT	(West Germany) E Pfaff (Nigeria) N Odizor	**6**	6^{5}	2
(Netherlands) **B Schultz** (Czechoslovakia) **T Šmíd**	2	**7^{7}**	**6**
(Canada) J Hetherington (Canada) G Connell	3	4
5	(Spain) **A Sánchez Vicario** (Mexico) **J Lozano**	**6**	**6**

Second round
1	(Soviet Union) **N Zvereva** (United States) **J Pugh**	**6**	**7**
(Soviet Union) N Medvedeva (United States) K Jones	1	5
(Netherlands) **M Bollegraf** (Denmark) **M Mortensen**	**6**	**6**
(United States) E Burgin (Australia) L Warder	3	3
(United States) **M McGrath** (Australia) **M Woodforde**	**6**	**7**
(United States) G Magers (United States) T Nelson	2	5
(Netherlands) B Schultz (Czechoslovakia) T Šmíd	6^{5}	6^{6}
5	(Spain) **A Sánchez Vicario** (Mexico) **J Lozano**	**7^{7}**	**7^{8}**

Quarterfinals
1	(Soviet Union) **N Zvereva** (United States) **J Pugh**	**6**	**6**
(Netherlands) M Bollegraf (Denmark) M Mortensen	0	4
(United States) **M McGrath** (Australia) **M Woodforde**	5	**6**	**6**
5	(Spain) A Sánchez Vicario (Mexico) J Lozano	**7**	2	4

Semifinals
1	(Soviet Union) **N Zvereva** (United States) **J Pugh**	2	**6**	**6**
(United States) M McGrath (Australia) M Woodforde	**6**	2	3

=== Bottom half ===
First round
ALT	(Australia) **R McQuillan** (New Zealand) **K Evernden**	**6**	**6**
(United States) C Kuhlman (United States) S DeVries	0	1
(New Zealand) **J Richardson** (Australia) **D Macpherson**	**7**	**6**
(Argentina) P Tarabini (United States) L Jensen	5	3
(United States) **P Louie-Harper** (United States) **C Beckman**	**6**	**6**
(United States) L McNeil (United States) R Seguso	4	3
(United States) S Collins (United States) T Witsken	3	3
3	(South Africa) **E Reinach** (South Africa) **P Aldrich**	**6**	**6**
8	(Australia) **E Smylie** (Australia) **T Woodbridge**	**6**	**6**
(United States) L Raymond (United States) I Baron	4	2
(United States) K Adams (The Bahamas) R Smith	4	**6**	1
(United States) **S McCarthy** (United States) **M Washington**	**6**	3	**6**
(United States) **R White** (United States) **S Cannon**	6^{5}	**6**	**7**
(United States) K Jordan (South Africa) C van Rensburg	**7^{7}**	4	5
ALT	(France) N van Lottum (Brazil) N Aerts	4	2
2	(United States) **Z Garrison** (United States) **R Leach**	**6**	**6**

Second round
ALT	(Australia) **R McQuillan** (New Zealand) **K Evernden**	4	**6**	**6**
(New Zealand) J Richardson (Australia) D Macpherson	**6**	2	3
(United States) P Louie-Harper (United States) C Beckman	1	**6**	4
3	(South Africa) **E Reinach** (South Africa) **P Aldrich**	**6**	1	**6**
8	(Australia) **E Smylie** (Australia) **T Woodbridge**	**7**	**7^{7}**
(United States) S McCarthy (United States) M Washington	5	6^{4}
(United States) R White (United States) S Cannon	**6**	1	3
2	(United States) **Z Garrison** (United States) **R Leach**	3	**6**	**6**

Quarterfinals
ALT	(Australia) **R McQuillan** (New Zealand) **K Evernden**	**7^{7}**	3	**6**
3	(South Africa) E Reinach (South Africa) P Aldrich	6^{4}	**6**	3
8	(Australia) **E Smylie** (Australia) **T Woodbridge**	**7^{7}**	**6**
2	(United States) Z Garrison (United States) R Leach	6^{2}	4

Semifinals
ALT	(Australia) R McQuillan (New Zealand) K Evernden	5	3
8	(Australia) **E Smylie** (Australia) **T Woodbridge**	**7**	**6**
