= 1991 Virginia Slims of Nashville =

- Date: November 4–10
- Edition: 7th
- Category: Tier IV
- Draw: 32S / 16D
- Prize money: $150,000
- Surface: Hard / indoor
- Location: Brentwood, Tennessee, U.S.
- Venue: Maryland Farms Racquet Club

Champions

Singles
- (Belgium) Sabine Appelmans

Doubles
- (United States) Sandy Collins / (South Africa) Elna Reinach
← 1990 ·	Virginia Slims of Nashville

The 1991 Virginia Slims of Nashville was a women's tennis tournament played on indoor hard courts at the Maryland Farms Racquet Club in Brentwood, Tennessee in the United States and was part of Tier IV of the 1991 WTA Tour. It was the sixth and last edition of the tournament and ran from November 4 through November 10, 1991. Fourth-seeded Sabine Appelmans won the singles title and earned $27,000 first-prize money.

== Finals ==
=== Singles ===
(Belgium) Sabine Appelmans defeated (United States) Katrina Adams 6–2, 6–4

- It was Appelmans' 2nd singles title of the year and of her career.

=== Doubles ===
(United States) Sandy Collins / (South Africa) Elna Reinach defeated (Indonesia) Yayuk Basuki / (Netherlands) Caroline Vis 5–7, 6–4, 7–6^{(9–7)}
