= 1990 US Open – Men's singles =

Men's singles
- 1990 US Open

Final
- Champion: (United States) Pete Sampras
- Runner-up: (United States) Andre Agassi
- Score: 6–4, 6–3, 6–2

Details
- Draw: 128
- Seeds: 16

Events
Singles	men	women		boys	girls
Doubles	men	women	mixed	boys	girls
WC Singles	men	women	quad
WC Doubles	men	women	quad
Legends	men	women	mixed
- US Open

Pete Sampras defeated Andre Agassi in the final, 6–4, 6–3, 6–2 to win the men's singles tennis title at the 1990 US Open. It was his first major title, and the first of a then record 14 men's singles major titles overall.

Boris Becker was the defending champion, but lost to Agassi in the semifinals.

Sampras defeated Ivan Lendl in the quarterfinals, ending Lendl's record streak of eight consecutive men's finals appearances at the US Open.

== Seeds ==
The seeded players are listed below. Pete Sampras is the champion; others show the round in which they were eliminated.

1. (Sweden) Stefan Edberg (first round)
2. (West Germany) Boris Becker (semifinalist)
3. (Czechoslovakia) Ivan Lendl (quarterfinalist)
4. (United States) Andre Agassi (finalist)
5. (Ecuador) Andrés Gómez (first round)
6. (Austria) Thomas Muster (fourth round)
7. (Spain) Emilio Sánchez (fourth round)
8. (United States) Brad Gilbert (third round)
9. (United States) Aaron Krickstein (quarterfinalist)
10. (Soviet Union) Andrei Chesnokov (third round)
11. (United States) Michael Chang (third round)
12. (United States) Pete Sampras (champion)
13. (United States) Jay Berger (fourth round)
14. (United States) Jim Courier (second round)
15. (Socialist Federal Republic of Yugoslavia) Goran Ivanišević (third round)
16. (Argentina) Martín Jaite (second round)

== Draw ==
Key

- Q = Qualifier
- WC = Wild card
- LL = Lucky loser
- Alt = Alternate
- ITF = ITF entry
- PR = Protected ranking
- SR = Special ranking
- SE = Special exempt
- JE = Junior exempt
- JR = Junior Accelerator Programme entrant
- CO = College Accelerator Programme entrant
- NG = Next Gen Accelerator Program entrant
- w/o = Walkover
- r = Retired
- d = Defaulted

=== Finals ===
Quarterfinals
(United States) David Wheaton	1	4	4
(United States) John McEnroe	6	6	6
3	(Czechoslovakia) Ivan Lendl	4	6^{4}	6	6	2
12	(United States) Pete Sampras	6	7^{7}	3	4	6
(Soviet Union) Andrei Cherkasov	2	2	3
4	(United States) Andre Agassi	6	6	6
9	(United States) Aaron Krickstein	6	3	2	3
2	(West Germany) Boris Becker	3	6	6	6

Semifinals
(United States) John McEnroe	2	4	6	3
12	(United States) Pete Sampras	6	6	3	6
4	(United States) Andre Agassi	6^{10}	6	6	6
2	(West Germany) Boris Becker	7^{12}	3	2	3

Final
12	(United States) Pete Sampras	6	6	6
4	(United States) Andre Agassi	4	3	2

=== Top half ===
==== Section 1 ====
First round
1	(Sweden) S Edberg	3	6^{3}	2
(Soviet Union) A Volkov	6	7^{7}	6
LL	(Italy) D Nargiso	3	7	6	4
(United States) T Witsken	6	6	7	6
(Argentina) A Mancini	2	4	3
(United States) M Washington	6	6	6
(United States) K Curren	6	6	6
Q	(Israel) S Perkiss	4	4	1
Q	(Australia) T Woodbridge	6	2	6	2
(Sweden) J Svensson	7	6	3	6
(United States) D Wheaton	6	6	6
(Spain) J Arrese	3	1	0
(Germany) P Kühnen	5	5	4
(United States) P Annacone	7	7	6
Q	(United States) M Blackman	3	4	3
16	(Argentina) M Jaite	6	6	6

Second round
(Soviet Union) A Volkov	2	2	3
(United States) T Witsken	6	6	6
(United States) M Washington	5	6^{5}	4
(United States) K Curren	7	7^{7}	6
(Sweden) J Svensson	4	5	5
(United States) D Wheaton	6	7	7
(United States) P Annacone	7	6	6
16	(Argentina) M Jaite	6	2	2

Third round
(United States) T Witsken	4	3	3
(United States) K Curren	6	6	6
(United States) D Wheaton	6	7	6
(United States) P Annacone	2	6	3

Fourth round
(United States) K Curren	5	6	6	4
(United States) D Wheaton	7	7	4	6

==== Section 2 ====
First round
10	(Soviet Union) A Chesnokov	6	7	6
(France) O Delaître	4	5	3
Q	(Japan) S Matsuoka	7	6	6
Q	(United States) D Witt	5	4	2
(Sweden) D Engel	6	6	6
Q	(Colombia) M Rincón	4	2	2
(United States) J McEnroe	7^{10}	7^{7}	6
(Spain) J Sánchez	6^{8}	6^{3}	4
(United States) J Grabb	6	6	6
(United States) L Duncan	4	2	4
WC	(United States) I Baron	2	4	4
(France) F Santoro	6	6	6
(United States) J Pugh	2	6	7	7
(Australia) R Fromberg	6	4	5	6
WC	(United States) B Garrow	6	4	4
7	(Spain) E Sánchez	7	6	6

Second round
10	(Soviet Union) A Chesnokov	6	6	6	6
Q	(Japan) S Matsuoka	7	3	1	3
(Sweden) D Engel	2	3	5
(United States) J McEnroe	6	6	7
(United States) J Grabb	6	4	6
(France) F Santoro	7	6	7
(United States) J Pugh	1	2	2
7	(Spain) E Sánchez	6	6	6

Third round
10	(Soviet Union) A Chesnokov	3	5	4
(United States) J McEnroe	6	7	6
(France) F Santoro	3	4	7	6	5
7	(Spain) E Sánchez	6	6	5	3	7

Fourth round
(United States) J McEnroe	7^{8}	3	4	6	6
7	(Spain) E Sánchez	6^{6}	6	6	4	3

==== Section 3 ====
First round
3	(Czechoslovakia) I Lendl	7	6	6
Q	(Canada) M Laurendeau	5	2	2
(Sweden) L Jönsson	4	2	5
(West Germany) M Stich	6	6	7
(Uruguay) M Filippini	2	5	4
Q	(Australia) C Limberger	6	7	6
(Austria) A Antonitsch	3	6	6	6
Q	(South Africa) M Kaplan	6	2	1	0
(Spain) J Altur	5	0	5
(Australia) J Anderson	7	6	7
(United States) B Pearce	5	7	5	0
(Israel) G Bloom	7	6	7	6
(Argentina) R Azar	3	6	1	2
(South Africa) G Muller	6	3	6	6
(Australia) W Masur	4	0	7	1
14	(United States) J Courier	6	6	5	6

Second round
3	(Czechoslovakia) I Lendl	6	5	6	6
(Germany) M Stich	4	7	3	3
Q	(Australia) C Limberger	1	7	4	3
(Austria) A Antonitsch	6	5	6	6
(Australia) J Anderson	3	3	6	6	6
(Israel) G Bloom	6	6	4	1	7
(South Africa) G Muller	4	6	7	7
14	(United States) J Courier	6	4	6	6

Third round
3	(Czechoslovakia) I Lendl	7^{7}	6	6
(Austria) A Antonitsch	6^{4}	1	2
(Israel) G Bloom	6	6	6
(South Africa) G Muller	2	3	4

Fourth round
3	(Czechoslovakia) I Lendl	6	6	6
(Israel) G Bloom	0	3	4

==== Section 4 ====
First round
12	(United States) P Sampras	6	7	6
(United States) D Goldie	1	5	1
Q	(United States) C Garner	1	2	2
Q	(Sweden) P Lundgren	6	6	6
LL	(Nigeria) N Odizor	2	6	2	6	5
(United States) T Ho	6	4	6	3	7
(United States) R Reneberg	6	6	4	0
(Switzerland) J Hlasek	3	7	6	6
(France) T Champion	7	3	6	7
(United States) T Mayotte	5	6	3	5
(Peru) J Yzaga	7	7	6
(Czechoslovakia) K Nováček	5	6	3
(Sweden) A Järryd	2	7
(Australia) S Youl	6	5	r
(Finland) A Rahunen	7	4	0	0	r
6	(Austria) T Muster	5	6	6	3

Second round
12	(United States) P Sampras	6	6	6
Q	(Sweden) P Lundgren	4	3	3
(United States) T Ho	3	2	6
(Switzerland) J Hlasek	6	6	7
(France) T Champion	1	6	3	2
(Peru) J Yzaga	6	3	6	6
(Sweden) A Järryd	4	3	6	1
6	(Austria) T Muster	6	6	4	6

Third round
12	(United States) P Sampras	6	6	6
(Switzerland) J Hlasek	3	4	1
(Peru) J Yzaga	2	2	6	7	6
6	(Austria) T Muster	6	6	4	5	7

Fourth round
12	(United States) P Sampras	6^{6}	7^{7}	6	6
6	(Austria) T Muster	7^{8}	6^{5}	4	3

=== Bottom half ===
==== Section 5 ====
First round
5	(Ecuador) A Gómez	3	6	3	3
(Brazil) L Mattar	6	3	6	6
(United Kingdom) J Bates	3	5	4
(Finland) V Paloheimo	6	7	6
WC	(United States) P McEnroe	6	6	1	2	7
(United States) J Tarango	3	4	6	6	5
(Czechoslovakia) M Střelba	6	6	2
(South Africa) C van Rensburg	7	7	6
(India) R Krishnan	4	1	1
(France) H Leconte	6	6	6
(Soviet Union) A Cherkasov	6	6	6	6
WC	(United States) R Seguso	0	7	2	3
(France) G Forget	6	4	6	4
(United States) J Arias	7	6	3	6
(Sweden) M Pernfors	0	2	3
11	(United States) M Chang	6	6	6

Second round
(Brazil) L Mattar	6	6	3	2	6
(Finland) V Paloheimo	4	0	6	6	3
WC	(United States) P McEnroe	4	4	5
(South Africa) C van Rensburg	6	6	7
(France) H Leconte	6	1	4	3
(Soviet Union) A Cherkasov	1	6	6	6
(United States) J Arias	6^{3}	3	2
11	(United States) M Chang	7^{7}	6	6

Third round
(Brazil) L Mattar	1	4	7	4
(South Africa) C van Rensburg	6	6	5	6
(Soviet Union) A Cherkasov	6	6	6
11	(United States) M Chang	4	4	3

Fourth round
(South Africa) C van Rensburg	4	4	5
(Soviet Union) A Cherkasov	6	6	7

==== Section 6 ====
First round
13	(United States) J Berger	6	6	3	6
(Haiti) R Agénor	4	4	6	4
Q	(Sweden) J Carlsson	3	6	6	6
Q	(United States) R Matuszewski	6	2	1	2
WC	(United States) S Bryan	2	5	6	2
Q	(Italy) C Caratti	6	7	2	6
(United States) D Rostagno	6	6	6
(France) T Benhabiles	4	2	2
(United States) G Layendecker	3	6	6	7
Q	(South Africa) D Bosse	6	3	3	6
(Argentina) F Davín	6	6	7
(United States) J Rive	4	4	6
(West Germany) E Jelen	6	3	0	3
(Czechoslovakia) P Korda	2	6	6	6
(Canada) G Connell	4	2	2
4	(United States) A Agassi	6	6	6

Second round
13	(United States) J Berger	3	6	6	6
Q	(Sweden) J Carlsson	6	1	4	2
Q	(Italy) C Caratti	3	7	6	1	7
(United States) D Rostagno	6	6	4	6	6
(United States) G Layendecker	7	3	2	4
(Argentina) F Davín	6	6	6	6
(Czechoslovakia) P Korda	5	7	0	4
4	(United States) A Agassi	7	5	6	6

Third round
13	(United States) J Berger	4	2	6	6	6
Q	(Italy) C Caratti	6	6	4	3	4
(Argentina) F Davín	5	4	0
4	(United States) A Agassi	7	6	6

Fourth round
13	(United States) J Berger	5	0	2
4	(United States) A Agassi	7	6	6

==== Section 7 ====
First round
8	(United States) B Gilbert	6	3	6	7
(Sweden) M Wilander	4	6	3	5
WC	(United States) R Leach	6	7	6
(United States) P Chamberlin	4	6	1
(Spain) S Bruguera	6	6	6
(Sweden) T Högstedt	3	2	2
(Israel) A Mansdorf	3	3	6	6	6
Q	(Australia) B Dyke	6	6	3	3	0
(Switzerland) M Rosset	6	6	3	3	3
(Australia) P Cash	2	2	6	6	6
(Australia) M Kratzmann	6	6	6	6
(United States) B Shelton	7	3	3	4
(West Germany) U Riglewski	6	1	0	1	r
(Australia) J Stoltenberg	4	6	6	2
(Canada) A Sznajder	1	6	7	1	1
9	(United States) A Krickstein	6	4	6	6	6

Second round
8	(United States) B Gilbert	7	6	6
WC	(United States) R Leach	6	4	2
(Spain) S Bruguera	6	2	6	3
(Israel) A Mansdorf	7	6	2	6
(Australia) P Cash	6	2	2	6	6
(Australia) M Kratzmann	4	6	6	1	4
(Australia) J Stoltenberg	4	2	4
9	(United States) A Krickstein	6	6	6

Third round
8	(United States) B Gilbert	7	7	3	6	1
(Israel) A Mansdorf	5	5	6	7	6
(Australia) P Cash	4	6^{4}	6
9	(United States) A Krickstein	6	7^{7}	7

Fourth round
(Israel) A Mansdorf	3	4	4
9	(United States) A Krickstein	6	6	6

==== Section 8 ====
First round
15	(Socialist Federal Republic of Yugoslavia) G Ivanišević	1	6	6	7
(Italy) O Camporese	6	4	1	6
WC	(United States) T Martin	6	3	6
(France) J Fleurian	7	6	7
(United States) K Jones	3	6	2	0
(Australia) D Cahill	6	3	6	6
(West Germany) C Steeb	5	6	3
(Czechoslovakia) M Šrejber	7	7	6
(Spain) T Carbonell	6	7	6	6
(Netherlands) P Haarhuis	7	6	4	0
(United States) S Davis	7	6	6
(New Zealand) K Evernden	5	1	3
(France) Y Noah	7	6	6	4	6
(United States) D Pate	6	4	7	6	2
(Spain) J Aguilera	5	3	2
2	(West Germany) B Becker	7	6	6

Second round
15	(Socialist Federal Republic of Yugoslavia) G Ivanišević	6	6	3	6
(France) J Fleurian	4	2	6	1
(Australia) D Cahill	6	2
(Czechoslovakia) M Šrejber	3	0	r
(Spain) T Carbonell	6	6	6
(United States) S Davis	4	4	2
(France) Y Noah	4	2	6^{2}
2	(West Germany) B Becker	6	6	7^{7}

Third round
15	(Socialist Federal Republic of Yugoslavia) G Ivanišević	6	6	2	6^{3}	0
(Australia) D Cahill	4	4	6	7^{7}	6
(Spain) T Carbonell	4	2	2
2	(West Germany) B Becker	6	6	6

Fourth round
(Australia) D Cahill	6	2	3	6	4
2	(West Germany) B Becker	2	6	6	3	6

Preceded by 1990 Wimbledon Championships – Men's singles	Grand Slam men's singles	Succeeded by 1991 Australian Open – Men's singles
