= Halle Cioffi =

American tennis player (born 1969)

- Country (sports): United States
- Born: August 5, 1969 (age 57)
- Prize money: US$ 321,171

Singles
- Career record: 154–121
- Career titles: 1
- Highest ranking: No. 31 (August 15, 1988)

Grand Slam singles results
- Australian Open: 2R (1990, 1992)
- French Open: 2R (1987, 1991)
- Wimbledon: 1R (1987, 1988, 1991)
- US Open: 3R (1989, 1990)

Doubles
- Career record: 29–46
- Career titles: 1

Grand Slam doubles results
- Australian Open: 2R (1989, 1990)
- Wimbledon: 2R (1991)
- US Open: 2R (1990)
- Last updated on: July 16, 2014.

Halle Cioffi (born 5 August 1969) is a retired professional tennis player from the United States. She is also known as Halle Carroll.

== Tennis ==
=== Singles ===
Halle Cioffi won her only WTA singles title in 1987 at Virginia Slims of Indianapolis, defeating Anne Smith in the final 4–6, 6–4, 7–6^{(12–10)}.

=== Doubles ===
Halle Cioffi's only WTA doubles title was in 1992 with Argentinian María José Gaidano, winning the Internazionali Femminili di Palermo by defeating Petra Langrová and Ana Segura in the final 6–3, 4–6, 6–3.
