= Natalia Medvedeva (tennis) =

Soviet-Ukrainian professional tennis player

Natalia Medvedeva Наталія Медведєвa
- Country (sports): Soviet Union; CIS; Ukraine
- Born: 15 November 1971 (age 53); Kyiv, Ukrainian SSR, Soviet Union
- Turned pro: 1987
- Retired: 1998
- Prize money: $906,455

Singles
- Career record: 186–128
- Career titles: 4
- Highest ranking: No. 23 (15 November 1993)

Grand Slam singles results
- Australian Open: 2R (1990, 1994, 1995, 1997)
- French Open: 3R (1989)
- Wimbledon: 3R (1993, 1996)
- US Open: 3R (1994)

Doubles
- Career record: 174–98
- Career titles: 12
- Highest ranking: No. 21 (4 July 1994)

Grand Slam doubles results
- Australian Open: QF (1990)
- French Open: QF (1994)
- Wimbledon: QF (1994)
- US Open: QF (1990)

Other doubles tournaments
- Tour Finals: SF (1990)
- Olympic Games: 1R (1996)

Mixed doubles

Grand Slam mixed doubles results
- Australian Open: SF (1994)
- French Open: SF (1990)
- Wimbledon: 1R (1993)
- US Open: 2R (1990, 1992, 1994)

Team competitions
- Hopman Cup: F (1995)

Natalia Olegovna Medvedeva (Ukrainian: Наталія Олегівна Медведєвa, romanized: Nataliya Olehivna Medvedyeva, Russian: Наталья Олеговна Медведева, romanized: Natalya Olegovna Medvedeva; born 15 November 1971) is a former Soviet, CIS and Ukrainian professional tennis player.

== Career ==
She played on the WTA tour from 1987 to 1998. Her four singles titles were won in Nashville, Tennessee in 1990, Linz in 1992, and Prague and Essen in 1993. In Essen, she beat Conchita Martínez, Arantrxa Sánchez, and Anke Huber.

She also won 12 doubles titles. She also won the girls' doubles title at the 1987 Wimbledon Championships, partnering Natalia Zvereva. She reached four Grand Slam quarterfinals in doubles: twice, with Leila Meskhi, in 1990, at the Australian and US Opens. She did it twice again in 1994, with Larisa Savchenko, at the French Open and Wimbledon Championships.

Medvedeva competed 16 times for the Ukraine Fed Cup team, with an 8–8 win–loss record. She came out of retirement for the 2000 Fed Cup because the team was struggling for players.

== Personal ==
Medvedeva's younger brother is Andriy Medvedev, the 1999 French Open finalist. They competed together at the 1995 Hopman Cup, losing in the final to the German team of Anke Huber and Boris Becker.

== WTA career finals ==
=== Singles: 5 (4 titles, 1 runner-up) ===
Legend
Grand Slam	0
WTA Championships	0
Tier I	0
Tier II	1
Tier III	1
Tier IV	2
Tier V	1

Result	W/L	Date	Tournament	Surface	Opponent	Score
Win	1–0	Nov 1990	Nashville, United States	Hard	(United States) Susan Sloane	6–3, 7–6^{(7–3)}
Win	2–0	Feb 1992	Linz, Austria	Hard	(France) Pascale Paradis-Mangon	6–4, 6–2
Win	3–0	Jul 1993	Prague, Czech Republic	Clay	(Germany) Meike Babel	6–3, 6–2
Loss	3–1	Aug 1993	Schenectady, United States	Hard	(Latvia) Larisa Neiland	3–6, 5–7
Win	4–1	Oct 1993	Essen, Germany	Carpet	(Spain) Conchita Martínez	6–7^{(4–7)}, 7–5, 6–4

=== Doubles: 13 (12 titles, 1 runner-up) ===
Legend
Grand Slam	0
WTA Championships	0
Tier I	0
Tier II	1
Tier III	1
Tier IV & V	8

Titles by surface
Hard	7
Clay	2
Grass	0
Carpet	3

Result	W/L	Date	Tournament	Surface	Partner	Opponents	Score
Win	1.	Apr 1988	Singapore	Hard	(Soviet Union) Natalia Bykova	(Soviet Union) Leila Meskhi (Soviet Union) Svetlana Cherneva	7–6, 6–3
Loss	1.	Nov 1989	Nashville, Tennessee, US	Hard	(Soviet Union) Leila Meskhi	(Netherlands) Manon Bollegraf (United States) Meredith McGrath	6–1, 6–7, 6–7
Win	2.	Feb 1990	Auckland, New Zealand	Hard	(Soviet Union) Leila Meskhi	(Canada) Jill Hetherington (United States) Robin White	3–6, 6–3, 7–6
Win	3.	Feb 1990	Wellington, New Zealand	Hard	(Soviet Union) Leila Meskhi	(Australia) Michelle Jaggard (New Zealand) Julie Richardson	6–3, 2–6, 6–4
Win	4.	Oct 1990	Dorado, Puerto Rico	Hard	(Soviet Union) Elena Brioukhovets	(United States) Amy Frazier (New Zealand) Julie Richardson	6–4, 6–2
Win	5.	Sep 1991	St. Petersburg, USSR	Carpet	(Soviet Union) Elena Brioukhovets	(France) Isabelle Demongeot (United Kingdom) Jo Durie	7–5, 6–3
Win	6.	Apr 1992	Pattaya, Thailand	Hard	(France) Isabelle Demongeot	(France) Pascale Paradis-Mangon (France) Sandrine Testud	6–1, 6–1
Win	7.	Apr 1992	Kuala Lumpur, Malaysia	Hard	(France) Isabelle Demongeot	(Japan) Rika Hiraki (Czechoslovakia) Petra Langrová	2–6, 6–4, 6–1
Win	8.	Jul 1993	Palermo, Italy	Clay	(Germany) Karin Kschwendt	(Italy) Silvia Farina (Netherlands) Brenda Schultz	6–4, 7–6^{(7–4)}
Win	9.	Oct 1993	Brighton, England	Carpet	(Italy) Laura Golarsa	(Germany) Anke Huber (Latvia) Larisa Savchenko	6–3, 1–6, 6–4
Win	10.	Jan 1994	Brisbane, Australia	Hard	(Italy) Laura Golarsa	(Australia) Jenny Byrne (Australia) Rachel McQuillan	6–3, 6–1
Win	11.	Aug 1996	Maria Lankowitz, Austria	Clay	(Slovakia) Janette Husárová	(Czech Republic) Lenka Cenková (Czech Republic) Kateřina Kroupová	6–4, 7–5
Win	12.	Nov 1996	Moscow, Russia	Carpet	(Latvia) Larisa Savchenko	(Italy) Silvia Farina (Austria) Barbara Schett	7–6^{(7–5)}, 4–6, 6–1

=== Team ===
Result	Date	Tournament	Surface	Partner	Opponents	Score
Loss	8 January 1995	Hopman Cup	Hard	(Ukraine) Andriy Medvedev	(Germany) Anke Huber (Germany) Boris Becker	0–2

== Top 10 wins ==
Season	1993	1994	Total
Wins	3	1	4

#	Player	Rank	Event	Surface	Round	Score	NMR
1993
1.	(Germany) Anke Huber	No. 10	Faber Grand Prix, Essen, Germany	Carpet	2nd round	6–4, 6–2	No. 40
2.	(Spain) Arantxa Sánchez Vicario	No. 2	Faber Grand Prix, Essen	Carpet	Semifinals	6–4, 2–6, 6–4	No. 40
3.	(Spain) Conchita Martínez	No. 5	Faber Grand Prix, Essen	Carpet	Final	6–7^{(4–7)}, 7–5, 6–4	No. 40
1994
4.	(Spain) Conchita Martínez	No. 3	Faber Grand Prix, Essen	Carpet	1st round	7–5, 6–4	No. 43

== Performance timelines ==
Key
W	F	SF	QF	#R	RR	Q#	DNQ	A	NH

(W) winner; (F) finalist; (SF) semifinalist; (QF) quarterfinalist; (#R) rounds 4, 3, 2, 1; (RR) round-robin stage; (Q#) qualification round; (DNQ) did not qualify; (A) absent; (NH) not held; (SR) strike rate (events won / competed); (W–L) win–loss record.

=== Singles ===
Tournament	1987	1988	1989	1990	1991	1992	1993	1994	1995	1996	1997	SR	W–L
Grand Slam tournaments
Australian Open	A	A	A	2R	1R	1R	A	2R	2R	A	2R	0 / 6	4–6
French Open	A	Q2	3R	2R	A	2R	1R	1R	1R	A	A	0 / 6	4–6
Wimbledon	1R	Q1	A	1R	A	2R	3R	1R	1R	3R	A	0 / 7	5–7
US Open	A	A	Q1	2R	A	2R	2R	3R	1R	A	1R	0 / 6	5–6
Win–loss	0–1	0–0	2–1	3–4	0–1	3–4	3–3	3–4	1–4	2–1	1–2	0 / 25	18–25

=== Doubles ===
Tournament	1988	1989	1990	1991	1992	1993	1994	1995	1996	1997	1998	SR	W–L
Grand Slam tournaments
Australian Open	A	A	QF	1R	1R	A	3R	1R	A	1R	A	0 / 6	5–6
French Open	A	A	3R	A	2R	2R	QF	1R	A	A	1R	0 / 6	7–6
Wimbledon	1R	A	2R	A	2R	2R	QF	2R	A	A	A	0 / 6	7–6
US Open	A	2R	QF	A	2R	2R	3R	A	A	2R	A	0 / 6	8–6
Year-end championships
WTA Championships	DNQ		SF	Did not qualify							1–1	0 / 1	1–1
Win–loss	0–1	1–1	9–5	0–1	3–4	3–3	10–4	1–3	0–0	1–2	0–1	0 / 25	28–25

=== Mixed doubles ===
Tournament	1990	1991	1992	1993	1994	1995	1996	1997	1998	SR	W–L
Australian Open	A	1R	A	A	SF	A	A	QF	A	0 / 3	5–3
French Open	SF	A	2R	2R	QF	QF	A	A	1R	0 / 6	10–6
Wimbledon	A	A	A	1R	A	A	A	A	A	0 / 1	0–1
US Open	2R	A	2R	1R	2R	A	A	A	A	0 / 4	3–4
Win–loss	5–2	0–1	2–2	1–3	6–3	2–1	0–0	2–1	0–1	0 / 14	18–14

== ITF finals ==
=== Singles: 5 (4 titles, 1 runner-up) ===
$100,000 tournaments
$75,000 tournaments
$50,000 tournaments
$25,000 tournaments
$10,000 tournaments

Result	No.	Date	Tournament	Surface	Opponent	Score
Win	1.	20 April 1987	Monte Viso, Italy	Clay	(Italy) Linda Ferrando	6–1, 6–3
Win	2.	2 November 1987	Telford, United Kingdom	Hard	(United Kingdom) Sarah Loosemore	6–2, 6–2
Win	3.	9 November 1987	Eastbourne, United Kingdom	Carpet	(Soviet Union) Eugenia Maniokova	6–2, 7–5
Win	4.	16 November 1987	Croydon, United Kingdom	Carpet	(United Kingdom) Teresa Catlin	6–2, 6–3
Loss	1.	24 April 1989	Monte Viso, Italy	Clay	(Australia) Rachel McQuillan	6–7, 1–6

=== Doubles: 9 (6 titles, 3 runner-ups) ===
Result	No.	Date	Tournament	Surface	Partner	Opponents	Score
Win	1.	6 April 1987	Caserta, Italy	Clay	(Soviet Union) Eugenia Maniokova	(West Germany) Heike Thoms (Greece) Olga Tsarbopoulou	6–3, 7–5
Win	2.	26 October 1987	Cheshire, United Kingdom	Carpet	(Soviet Union) Eugenia Maniokova	(Hong Kong) Paulette Moreno (Sweden) Maria Strandlund	6–2, 7–6
Win	3.	2 November 1987	Telford, United Kingdom	Hard	(Soviet Union) Eugenia Maniokova	(West Germany) Sabine Hack (West Germany) Ingrid Peltzer	6–0, 6–2
Win	4.	9 November 1987	Eastbourne, United Kingdom	Carpet	(Soviet Union) Eugenia Maniokova	(France) Pascale Etchemendy (United Kingdom) Joy Tacon	6–1, 6–1
Loss	1.	12 October 1987	Croydon, United Kingdom	Carpet	(Soviet Union) Eugenia Maniokova	(Soviet Union) Viktoria Milvidskaia (Hong Kong) Paulette Moreno	6–3, 3–6, 4–6
Win	5.	17 April 1989	Caserta, Italy	Hard	(Soviet Union) Eugenia Maniokova	(Finland) Nanne Dahlman (Australia) Kate McDonald	6–4, 6–4
Loss	2.	26 August 1996	Kyiv, Ukraine	Clay	(Ukraine) Anna Zaporozhanova	(Sweden) Anna-Karin Svensson (Hungary) Réka Vidáts	5–7, 3–6
Win	6.	28 September 1996	Limoges, France	Hard (i)	(Latvia) Larisa Neiland	(France) Caroline Dhenin (Belgium) Dominique Monami	6–1, 6–1
Loss	3.	8 September 1997	Kyiv, Ukraine	Clay	(Ukraine) Angelina Zdorovitskaia	(Sweden) Annica Lindstedt (Germany) Caroline Schneider	1–6, 2–6
