= Leila Meskhi =

Georgian tennis player

Leila Meskhi ლეილა მესხი
- Country (sports): Soviet Union, CIS, Unified Team, Georgia
- Residence: Tbilisi, Georgia
- Born: 5 January 1968 (age 58) Tbilisi, Georgian SSR, Soviet Union
- Height: 1.64 m (5 ft 4 1/2 in)
- Turned pro: 1986
- Retired: 1995
- Plays: Right-handed (two-handed backhand)
- Prize money: $1,179,720

Singles
- Career record: 223–134
- Career titles: 5 WTA, 1 ITF
- Highest ranking: No. 12 (5 August 1991)

Grand Slam singles results
- Australian Open: 4R (1992)
- French Open: 4R (1991, 1992)
- Wimbledon: 2R (1988)
- US Open: QF (1990)

Doubles
- Career record: 171–122
- Career titles: 5 WTA, 2 ITF
- Highest ranking: No. 21 (10 April 1995)

Grand Slam doubles results
- Australian Open: QF (1995)
- French Open: QF (1994)
- Wimbledon: 2R (1988, 1990, 1992, 1993, 1994)
- US Open: SF (1991)

Team competitions
- Fed Cup: 6–5
Medal record
Representing the Unified Team
Olympic Games
Bronze medal – third place	1992 Barcelona	Doubles
Representing the Soviet Union
Universiade
Gold medal – first place	1987 Zagreb	Singles
Gold medal – first place	1987 Zagreb	Doubles

Leila Meskhi (Georgian: ლეილა მესხი, romanized: leila meskhi, pronounced [leila mesχi]; born 5 January 1968) is a retired Georgian professional tennis player.

Meskhi has won five singles and doubles titles on the WTA Tour. She has also won one singles and two doubles titles on the ITF Women's Circuit. On 5 August 1991, she reached her best singles ranking of world No. 12. On 10 April 1995, she peaked at No. 21 in the WTA doubles rankings.

Her best performance at a Grand Slam tournament came when she got to the quarterfinals of the 1990 US Open, defeating Akiko Kijimuta, Natasha Zvereva, Katia Piccolini and Linda Ferrando before losing to eventual champion Gabriela Sabatini in straight sets.

== WTA career finals ==
=== Singles: 11 (5 titles, 6 runner-ups) ===
Legend
Tier I (1)
Tier II (0)
Tier III (0)
Tier IV (3)
Tier V (7)

Result	W/L	Date	Tournament	Tier	Surface	Opponent	Score
Loss	0–1	Apr 1988	WTA Singapore Open	Cat 1	Hard	(United Kingdom) Monique Javer	6–7^{(3–7)}, 3–6
Loss	0–2	Feb 1989	Cellular South Cup, Oklahoma City	Cat 2	Hard	(Netherlands) Manon Bollegraf	4–6, 4–6
Win	1–2	Nov 1989	VS of Nashville	Cat 2	Hard	(Canada) Helen Kelesi	6–2, 6–3
Win	2–2	Jan 1990	Auckland Open	Tier V	Hard	(Belgium) Sabine Appelmans	6–1, 6–0
Loss	2–3	Feb 1990	Wellington Classic	Tier V	Hard	(West Germany) Wiltrud Probst	6–1, 4–6, 0–6
Win	3–3	Oct 1990	Moscow Ladies Open	Tier V	Carpet (i)	(Soviet Union) Elena Brioukhovets	6–4, 6–4
Loss	3–4	Nov 1990	Indianapolis	Tier IV	Hard (i)	(Spain) Conchita Martínez	4–6, 2–6
Win	4–4	Feb 1991	Wellington Classic	Tier V	Hard	(Czechoslovakia) Andrea Strnadová	3–6, 7–6^{(7–3)}, 6–2
Loss	4–5	Apr 1991	Family Circle Cup, Hilton Head	Tier I	Clay	(Argentina) Gabriela Sabatini	1–6, 1–6
Loss	4–6	Sep 1991	WTA Bayonne	Tier IV	Carpet	(Switzerland) Manuela Maleeva-Fragniere	6–4, 3–6, 4–6
Win	5–6	Jan 1995	Hobart International	Tier IV	Hard	(China) Li Fang	6–2, 6–3

=== Doubles: 12 (5 titles, 7 runner-up) ===
Result	W/L	Date	Tournament	Surface	Partner	Opponents	Score
Loss	0–1	Sep 1987	Hamburg, West Germany	Clay	(Soviet Union) Natalia Egorova	(West Germany) Claudia Kohde-Kilsch (Czechoslovakia) Jana Novotná	6–7^{(1–7)}, 6–7^{(6–8)}
Loss	0–2	Apr 1988	Singapore	Hard	(Soviet Union) Svetlana Parkhomenko	(Soviet Union) Natalia Egorova (Soviet Union) Natalia Medvedeva	6–7, 3–6
Loss	0–3	Jun 1988	Birmingham, Great Britain	Grass	(Soviet Union) Svetlana Parkhomenko	(Soviet Union) Larisa Neiland (Soviet Union) Natasha Zvereva	4–6, 1–6
Loss	0–4	Feb 1989	Wichita, United States	Hard	(United States) Sandy Collins	(Netherlands) Manon Bollegraf (South Africa) Lise Gregory	2–6, 6–7
Loss	0–5	Nov 1989	Nashville, United States	Hard	(Soviet Union) Natalia Medvedeva	(Netherlands) Manon Bollegraf (United States) Meredith McGrath	6–1, 6–7^{(5–7)}, 6–7^{(4–7)}
Win	1–5	Feb 1990	Auckland, New Zealand	Hard	(Soviet Union) Natalia Medvedeva	(Canada) Jill Hetherington (United States) Robin White	3–6, 6–3, 7–6^{(7–3)}
Win	2–5	Feb 1990	Wellington, New Zealand	Hard	(Soviet Union) Natalia Medvedeva	(Australia) Michelle Jaggard (New Zealand) Julie Richardson	6–3, 2–6, 6–4
Win	3–5	Feb 1993	Linz, Austria	Carpet (i)	(Russia) Eugenia Maniokova	(Spain) Conchita Martínez (Austria) Judith Wiesner	w/o
Win	4–5	Apr 1993	Amelia Island, United States	Clay	(Switzerland) Manuela Maleeva	(South Africa) Amanda Coetzer (Argentina) Inés Gorrochategui	3–6, 6–3, 6–4
Win	5–5	Feb 1994	Linz, Austria	Carpet (i)	(Russia) Eugenia Maniokova	(Sweden) Åsa Carlsson (Germany) Caroline Schneider	6–2, 6–2
Loss	5–6	Apr 1994	Hamburg, Germany	Clay	(Russia) Eugenia Maniokova	(Czech Republic) Jana Novotná (Spain) Arantxa Sánchez Vicario	3–6, 2–6
Loss	5–7	Oct 1994	Essen, Germany	Carpet (i)	(Russia) Eugenia Maniokova	(Sweden) Maria Lindström (Sweden) Maria Strandlund	2–6, 1–6

== ITF finals ==
$25,000 tournaments

=== Singles (1–0) ===
Result	No.	Date	Tournament	Surface	Opponent	Score
Win	1.	26 January 1987	Tarzana, United States	Hard	(United Kingdom) Clare Wood	1–6, 6–4, 6–2

=== Doubles (2-0) ===
Result	No.	Date	Tournament	Surface	Partner	Opponents	Score
Win	3.	10 October 1986	Bethesda, United States	Hard	(Soviet Union) Natasha Zvereva	(United States) Jane Forman (United States) Jenni Goodling	6–3, 6–1
Win	4.	3 May 1987	Taranto, Italy	Clay	(Soviet Union) Natasha Zvereva	(Netherlands) Simone Schilder (United Kingdom) Clare Wood	6–3, 6–2

== Grand Slam performance timeline ==
Key
W	F	SF	QF	#R	RR	Q#	DNQ	A	NH

(W) winner; (F) finalist; (SF) semifinalist; (QF) quarterfinalist; (#R) rounds 4, 3, 2, 1; (RR) round-robin stage; (Q#) qualification round; (DNQ) did not qualify; (A) absent; (NH) not held; (SR) strike rate (events won / competed); (W–L) win–loss record.

=== Singles ===
Tournament	1986	1987	1988	1989	1990	1991	1992	1993	1994	1995
Australian Open	A	A	A	A	3R	A	4R	1R	1R	1R
French Open	A	A	A	1R	3R	4R	4R	3R	3R	A
Wimbledon	A	Q2	2R	A	1R	A	1R	1R	1R	A
US Open	A	A	3R	3R	QF	3R	2R	2R	4R	A

== Best Grand Slam results details ==
=== Singles ===
	Australian Open			
1992 Australian Open (13th seed)
Round	Opponent	Rank	Score	LMR
1R	(Mexico) Angélica Gavaldón (Q)	No. 243	6–2, 6–2	No. 16
2R	(United States) Nicole Arendt (Q)	No. 216	6–1, 6–2	No. 16
3R	(Germany) Marketa Kochta	No. 74	6–1, 7–6^{(7–4)}	No. 16
4R	(Federal Republic of Yugoslavia) Monica Seles (1)	No. 1	4–6, 6–4, 2–6	No. 16

	French Open			
1991 French Open (14th seed)
Round	Opponent	Rank	Score	LMR
1R	(Austria) Sandra Dopfer (LL)	No. 140	6–2, 6–2	No. 15
2R	(Germany) Claudia Kohde-Kilsch	No. 42	7–5, 6–1	No. 15
3R	(United States) Linda Harvey-Wild	No. 72	6–3, 6–1	No. 15
4R	(Czechoslovakia) Jana Novotná (6)	No. 7	0–6, 6–7^{(7–9)}	No. 15
1992 French Open (15th seed)
Round	Opponent	Rank	Score	LMR
1R	(Italy) Laura Garrone	No. 97	6–1, 6–3	No. 20
2R	(Italy) Federica Bonsignori	No. 110	6–1, 6–1	No. 20
3R	(Italy) Linda Ferrando	No. 72	1–6, 7–6^{(10–8)}, 6–4	No. 20
4R	(Spain) Conchita Martínez (7)	No. 8	4–6, 5–7	No. 20

	Wimbledon Championships			
1988 Wimbledon
Round	Opponent	Rank	Score	LMR
1R	(United States) Sandy Collins (Q)	No. 189	6–4, 4–6, 9–7	No. 33
2R	(United States) Mary Joe Fernández (16)	No. 12	1–6, 5–7	No. 33

	US Open			
1990 US Open
Round	Opponent	Rank	Score	LMR
1R	(Japan) Akiko Kijimuta (LL)	No. 113	3–6, 6–2, 6–4	No. 21
2R	(Soviet Union) Natasha Zvereva (14)	No. 12	6–4, 6–0	No. 21
3R	(Italy) Katia Piccolini	No. 85	6–2, 4–6, 7–6^{(7–2)}	No. 21
4R	(Italy) Linda Ferrando	No. 82	7–6^{(7–4)}, 6–1	No. 21
QF	(Argentina) Gabriela Sabatini (5)	No. 5	6–7^{(5–7)}, 4–6	No. 21
