= Elise Burgin =

American tennis player

- Country (sports): United States
- Born: March 5, 1962 (age 64) Baltimore, Maryland, U.S.
- Turned pro: 1980
- Retired: 1993
- Plays: Left-handed
- Prize money: US$ 825,452

Singles
- Career record: 158–194
- Career titles: 1
- Highest ranking: No. 22 (December 31, 1985)

Grand Slam singles results
- Australian Open: 3R (1989)
- French Open: 2R (1985, 1986, 1989, 1990)
- Wimbledon: 3R (1985, 1986, 1987)
- US Open: 4R (1982)

Doubles
- Career record: 282–165
- Career titles: 10
- Highest ranking: No. 7 (April 13, 1987)

Grand Slam doubles results
- Australian Open: QF (1989)
- French Open: SF (1985)
- Wimbledon: SF (1986)
- US Open: SF (1986)

Elise Burgin (born March 5, 1962) is a retired American tennis player. She achieved WTA rankings of 22 in singles and 7 in doubles.

== Personal life ==
Burgin, who is Jewish, was born in Baltimore, Maryland and grew up in Maryland.

== Tennis career ==
Before playing professionally, Burgin was an outstanding singles and doubles player at Stanford University, from which she graduated. A four-time All-American from 1981 to 1984, she teamed with Linda Gates in 1984 to win the NCAA doubles championship.

She competed professionally from 1980 to 1993. In 1982, she reached the fourth round of the US Open (where she was beaten by Bonnie Gadusek), her best performance in singles in a Grand Slam tournament. In 1986, she won her only career singles title at Charleston, South Carolina.

Burgin was a member of the U.S. Federation Cup team in 1985 and 1987. In 1986, Burgin was captain of the U.S. Wightman Cup team.

During her career, she won eleven tournaments on the WTA Tour, including ten in doubles. She reached No. 7 in the world in doubles.

After retiring in 1993, Burgin has become a tennis commentator.

In 2003, she was inducted into the USTA Mid–Atlantic Tennis Hall of Fame.

== WTA career finals ==
=== Singles: 4 (1 title, 3 runner-ups) ===
Legend
Grand Slam	0
Tier I	0
Tier II	0
Tier III	0
Tier IV & V	0

Result	W/L	Date	Tournament	Surface	Opponent	Score
Loss	0–1	Mar 1985	Indianapolis, U.S.	Hard	(United States) Kathleen Horvath	2–6, 4–6
Loss	0–2	May 1985	Houston, U.S.	Clay	(United States) Martina Navratilova	4–6, 1–6
Win	1–2	Apr 1986	Charleston, U.S.	Clay	(Denmark) Tine Scheuer-Larsen	6–1, 6–3
Loss	1–3	Sep 1989	Phoenix, U.S.	Hard	(Spain) Conchita Martínez	6–3, 4–6, 2–6

=== Doubles: 29 (10 titles, 19 runner-ups) ===
Legend
Grand Slam	0
WTA Championships	0
Tier I	0
Tier II	0
Tier III	0
Tier IV & V	1

Titles by surface
Hard	6
Clay	2
Grass	1
Carpet	2

Result	W/L	Date	Tournament	Surface	Partner	Opponents	Score
Loss	1.	Aug 1984	US Open Clay Courts	Clay	(United States) JoAnne Russell	(South Africa) Beverly Mould (United States) Paula Smith	2–6, 5–7
Win	2.	Mar 1985	Indianapolis, U.S.	Hard	(United States) Kathleen Horvath	(South Africa) Jennifer Mundel (United States) Molly Van Nostrand	6–4, 6–1
Loss	3.	Apr 1985	Seabrook Island, U.S.	Clay	(United States) Lori McNeil	(Soviet Union) Svetlana Cherneva (Soviet Union) Larisa Savchenko	1–6, 3–6
Loss	4.	Apr 1985	Orlando, U.S.	Clay	(United States) Kathleen Horvath	(United States) Martina Navratilova (United States) Pam Shriver	3–6, 1–6
Win	5.	May 1985	Houston, U.S.	Clay	(United States) Martina Navratilova	(Bulgaria) Manuela Maleeva (Czechoslovakia) Helena Suková	6–1, 3–6, 6–3
Loss	6.	Jun 1985	Birmingham, England	Grass	(United States) Alycia Moulton	(United States) Terry Holladay (United States) Sharon Walsh-Pete	4–6, 7–5, 3–6
Loss	7.	Sep 1985	Chicago, U.S.	Carpet	(United States) JoAnne Russell	(United States) Kathy Jordan (Australia) Liz Smylie	2–6, 2–6
Loss	8.	May 1986	Houston, U.S.	Clay	(United States) JoAnne Russell	(United States) Chris Evert-Lloyd (Australia) Wendy Turnbull	2–6, 4–6
Win	9.	May 1986	Lugano, Switzerland	Clay	(United States) Betsy Nagelsen	(Australia) Jenny Byrne (Australia) Janine Tremelling	6–2, 6–3
Win	10.	Jun 1986	Birmingham, England	Grass	(South Africa) Rosalyn Fairbank	(Australia) Liz Smylie (Australia) Wendy Turnbull	6–2, 6–4
Loss	11.	Aug, 1986	San Diego, U.S.	Hard	(South Africa) Rosalyn Fairbank	(United States) Beth Herr (United States) Alycia Moulton	7–5, 2–6, 4–6
Win	12.	Sep 1986	Tampa, U.S.	Hard	(South Africa) Rosalyn Fairbank	(United States) Gigi Fernández (United States) Kim Sands	7–5, 6–2
Loss	13.	Feb 1987	Tokyo, Japan	Carpet (i)	(United States) Pam Shriver	(West Germany) Claudia Kohde-Kilsch (Czechoslovakia) Helena Suková	1–6, 6–7
Loss	14.	Mar 1987	Dallas, U.S.	Carpet (i)	(United States) Robin White	(United States) Mary Lou Daniels (United States) Anne White	5–7, 3–6
Win	15.	Mar 1987	Washington, D.C., U.S.	Carpet (i)	(United States) Pam Shriver	(United States) Zina Garrison (United States) Lori McNeil	6–1, 3–6, 6–4
Loss	16.	May 1987	Tampa, U.S.	Clay	(South Africa) Rosalyn Fairbank	(United States) Chris Evert (Australia) Wendy Turnbull	4–6, 3–6
Loss	17.	Aug 1987	San Diego, U.S.	Hard	(United States) Sharon Walsh-Pete	(Czechoslovakia) Jana Novotná (France) Catherine Suire	3–6, 4–6
Win	18.	Nov 1987	Worcester, U.S.	Carpet	(South Africa) Rosalyn Fairbank	(West Germany) Bettina Bunge (West Germany) Eva Pfaff	6–4, 6–4
Win	18.	Sep 1988	Phoenix, U.S.	Hard	(South Africa) Rosalyn Fairbank	(United States) Beth Herr (United States) Terry Phelps	6–7, 7–6, 7–6
Loss	19.	Oct 1988	Nashville, U.S.	Hard	(South Africa) Rosalyn Fairbank	(Australia) Jenny Byrne (Australia) Janine Tremelling	5–7, 7–6, 4–6
Loss	20.	Mar 1989	Oklahoma City, U.S.	Hard	(Australia) Liz Smylie	(United States) Lori McNeil (United States) Betsy Nagelsen	w/o
Loss	21.	Apr 1989	Tampa, U.S.	Clay	(South Africa) Rosalyn Fairbank	(Netherlands) Brenda Schultz (Hungary) Andrea Temesvári	6–7, 4–6
Win	22.	Aug 1989	San Diego, U.S.	Hard	(South Africa) Rosalyn Fairbank	(United States) Gretchen Magers (United States) Robin White	4–6, 6–3, 6–3
Loss	23.	Sep 1989	Phoenix, U.S.	Hard	(South Africa) Rosalyn Fairbank	(United States) Penny Barg (United States) Mareen Louie-Harper	6–7, 6–7
Loss	24.	Sep 1989	Dallas, U.S.	Carpet (i)	(South Africa) Rosalyn Fairbank	(United States) Mary Joe Fernández (United States) Betsy Nagelsen	6–7, 3–6
Loss	25.	Nov 1989	Worcester, U.S.	Carpet (i)	(South Africa) Rosalyn Fairbank	(United States) Martina Navratilova (United States) Pam Shriver	4–6, 6–4, 4–6
Loss	26.	Mar 1990	Boca Raton, U.S.	Hard	(Australia) Wendy Turnbull	(Czechoslovakia) Jana Novotná (Czechoslovakia) Helena Suková	4–6, 2–6
Loss	27.	May 1990	Geneva, Switzerland	Clay	(United States) Betsy Nagelsen	(Australia) Louise Field (South Africa) Dianne Van Rensburg	7–5, 6–7, 5–7
Loss	28.	Aug 1990	San Diego, U.S.	Hard	(South Africa) Rosalyn Fairbank	(United States) Patty Fendick (United States) Zina Garrison	4–6, 6–7
Win	29.	Oct 1990	Scottsdale, U.S.	Hard	(Canada) Helen Kelesi	(United States) Sandy Collins (United States) Ronni Reis	6–4, 6–2

== See also ==
- List of select Jewish tennis players
