= Virginia Slims of Nashville =

Defunct tennis tournament
- Event name: Virginia Slims of Chattanooga (1971); Commercial Union Bank Classic (1973); Avon Futures of Nashville (1981); Avon Futures of Tennessee (1982); Ginny of Nashville (1983-84); Virginia Slims of Nashville (1988-91)
- Tour: Virginia Slims Circuit (1970, 1973); Avon Futures Circuit (1981-82); Ginny Circuit (1983-84); Virginia Slims World Championship Series (1988-89); WTA Tour (1990–91)
- Founded: 1971
- Abolished: 1991
- Editions: 9
- Surface: Hard / indoor (1971); Red Clay / outdoor (1973); Green Clay / outdoor (1981-82); Carpet / indoor (1983-84, 1988-91)

The Virginia Slims of Nashville is a defunct WTA Tour tennis tournament first founded in 1971 as the Virginia Slims of Chattanooga and first played in Chattanooga, Tennessee. The tournament ran annually with breaks, name changes and court surface changes until 1991 when it was last played in Nashville, Tennessee in the United States.

== History ==
In February 1971 the Virginia Slims of Chattanooga event was founded, that event was played on indoor hard courts at the Manker Patten Tennis Center for one edition only.

In 1973 the event was revived at Nashville, Tennessee under a different official name the Nashville Classic its sponsored name was the Commercial Union Bank Classic, and was played on outdoor red clay courts at the Centennial Park Tennis Center when it was discontinued again.

In 1981 after a break of eight years professional tour tennis returned to Nashville with the staging of the Avon Futures of Nashville tournament that was played at the Westside Racquet Club, part of the Westside Athletic Club complex on outdoor green clay courts.

In 1982 it was rebranded as the Avon Futures of Tennessee and was part of the Avon Futures Circuit.

In 1983 the event was moved to the Maryland Farms Racquet Club, in Brentwood, Tennessee

Also in 1983 the Ginny Satellite Circuit, replaced the Avon Futures Circuit, the previous event was then renamed as the Ginny of Nashville and was played indoors on hard Lykold courts until 1984 when it was stopped again.

In 1988 the event was revived as the Virginia Slims of Nashville as part of the Virginia Slims World Championship Series, and was played again at the Maryland Farms Racquet Club in Brentwood, Tennessee until 1989 as part of that circuit. In 1990 it be became a WTA Tour event until 1991.

== Finals ==
=== Singles ===
Year	Champions	Runners-up	Score
1971	(United States) Billie Jean King	(United Kingdom) Ann Haydon Jones	6–4, 6–1
1973	(Australia) Margaret Court	(United States) Billie Jean King	6–3, 4–6, 6–2
1974 – 1980	Not held		
1981	(United States) Susan Leo	(United States) Kim Sands	7–6, 6–3
1982	(West Germany) Eva Pfaff	(United States) Leigh-Anne Thompson	6–3, 7–5
1983	(United States) Kathleen Horvath	(Czechoslovakia) Marcela Skuherská	6–4, 6–3
1984	(United States) Jenny Klitch	(United States) Pam Teeguarden	6–2, 6–1
1985 – 1987	Not held		
1988	(United States) Susan Sloane	(United States) Beverly Bowes	6–3, 6–2
1989	(Soviet Union) Leila Meskhi	(Canada) Helen Kelesi	6–2, 6–3
1990	(Soviet Union) Natalia Medvedeva	(United States) Susan Sloane	6–3, 7–6^{(7–3)}
1991	(Belgium) Sabine Appelmans	(United States) Katrina Adams	6–2, 6–4

=== Doubles ===
Year	Champions	Runners-up	Score
1973	(France) Françoise Dürr (Netherlands) Betty Stöve	(Australia) Karen Krantzcke (United States) Janet Newberry	6–4, 6–7, 6–1
1974 – 1982	Not held		
1983	(South Africa) Rosalyn Fairbank (United States) Candy Reynolds	(United States) Alycia Moulton (United States) Paula Smith	6–4, 7–6
1984	(United States) Sherry Acker (United States) Candy Reynolds	(United States) Mary Lou Piatek (United States) Paula Smith	5–7, 7–6, 7–6
1985 – 1987	Not held		
1988	(Australia) Jenny Byrne (Australia) Janine Tremelling	(United States) Elise Burgin (South Africa) Rosalyn Fairbank	7–5, 6–7^{(1–7)}, 6–4
1989	(Netherlands) Manon Bollegraf (United States) Meredith McGrath	(Soviet Union) Natalia Medvedeva (Soviet Union) Leila Meskhi	1–6, 7–6^{(7–5)}, 7–6^{(7–4)}
1990	(United States) Kathy Jordan (Soviet Union) Larisa Savchenko	(Netherlands) Brenda Schultz (Netherlands) Caroline Vis	6–1, 6–2
1991	(United States) Sandy Collins (South Africa) Elna Reinach	(Indonesia) Yayuk Basuki (Netherlands) Caroline Vis	5–7, 6–4, 7–6^{(9–7)}

== Event names ==
- Virginia Slims of Chattanooga (1971)
- Commercial Union Bank Classic (1973)
- Avon Futures of Nashville (1981)
- Avon Futures of Tennessee (1982)
- Ginny of Nashville (1983–84)
- Virginia Slims of Nashville (1988–91)
