= Susan Sloane =

American tennis player

- Country (sports): United States
- Residence: Lexington, Kentucky, U.S.
- Born: December 5, 1970 (age 55) Lexington, Kentucky, U.S.
- Turned pro: 1986
- Retired: 1993
- Plays: Right-handed
- Prize money: $339,021

Singles
- Career record: 131–109
- Career titles: 1
- Highest ranking: No. 19 (July 3, 1989)

Grand Slam singles results
- Australian Open: 1R (1992)
- French Open: 3R (1988, 1989)
- Wimbledon: 2R (1986, 1987, 1988, 1989, 1990)
- US Open: 3R (1988, 1989)

Doubles
- Career record: 6–25
- Career titles: 0
- Highest ranking: No. 202 (October 26, 1987)

Susan Sloane (born December 5, 1970) is a retired American professional tennis player. She was also known by her married name, Susan Sloane-Lundy.

== Career ==
Sloane won seven national titles and three Kentucky state championships as a junior. As a teenager, she moved to train at the Nick Bollettieri Tennis Academy in Bradenton, Florida. She turned professional in 1986 and joined the WTA Tour. In 1988, she won the Virginia Slims of Nashville, her first and only singles title. She was runner-up at the same tournament in 1990. She achieved a career high ranking of World #19 on July 3, 1989. She posted career victories over Jo Durie, Sylvia Hanika, Carling Bassett, and Lori McNeil. She retired in 1993. She is the assistant director of tennis at Topseed Tennis Club.

== WTA career finals ==
=== Singles: 2 (1-1) ===
Legend Grand Slam tournaments (0–0) WTA Tour Championships (0–0) Tier I (0–0) Tier II (0–20) Tier III (0–0) Tier IV (0–1) Tier V (1–0) Virginia Slims (0–0)	Titles by surface Hard (1–1) Grass (0–0) Clay (0–0) Carpet (0–0)

Result	W/L	Date	Tournament	Surface	Opponent	Score
Win	1–0	Oct 1988	Nashville, U.S.	Hard (i)	(United States) Beverly Bowes	6–3, 6–2
Loss	1–1	Oct 1990	Nashville, U.S.	Hard (i)	(Soviet Union) Natalia Medvedeva	3–6, 6–7^{(3–7)}
