= Helen Kelesi =

Canadian tennis player

- Country (sports): Canada
- Born: 15 November 1969 (age 56) Victoria, British Columbia, Canada
- Turned pro: 1985
- Plays: Right-handed (two-handed backhand)
- Prize money: US$900,990

Singles
- Career record: 263–182
- Career titles: 2 WTA, 3 ITF
- Highest ranking: No. 13 (20 November 1989)

Grand Slam singles results
- Australian Open: 3R (1990)
- French Open: QF (1988, 1989)
- Wimbledon: 3R (1993)
- US Open: 3R (1986, 1987)

Other tournaments
- Olympic Games: 1R (1988)

Doubles
- Career record: 81–109
- Career titles: 2 WTA
- Highest ranking: No. 26 (22 April 1991)

Grand Slam doubles results
- Australian Open: 2R (1992)
- French Open: QF (1989)
- Wimbledon: 2R (1987, 1988)
- US Open: 2R (1990, 1991)

Grand Slam mixed doubles results
- French Open: 2R (1988)
- Wimbledon: 2R (1986, 1987)

Helen Kelesi (born 15 November 1969) is a former professional tennis player from Canada. She was coached by her father Milan Kelesi.

== Career ==
"Hurricane Helen", as the Canadian press dubbed her for her fiery demeanour, achieved a career-high ranking of world No. 13 (November 1989), and was a regular fixture in the top 25 from 1986 to 1991. She won singles titles at two tour events, the 1986 Japan Open and the 1988 Citta de Taranto, and at the French Open, she was a quarterfinalist in 1988 (losing to Gabriela Sabatini) and 1989 (losing to Mary Joe Fernández). During her time on the WTA Tour, Kelesi recorded wins over Arantxa Sánchez Vicario, Conchita Martínez, Jana Novotná, Manuela Maleeva-Fragnière, Helena Suková and Pam Shriver.

Kelesi's game was characterized by aggressive baseline play, with a powerful top-spin forehand and two-handed backhand. She also retrieved well and could play defensively when needed. These skills meant that Kelesi was particularly good on clay and hardcourt surfaces.

Kelesi was a Canadian Federation Cup team member from 1986 to 1993. She was Tennis Canada Singles Player of the Year four times (1986, 1987, 1989, and 1990).

Her professional career came to an end in 1995 when a brain tumour the size of a tennis ball was discovered following months of headaches, dizziness and vision problems. Numerous operations followed over the years. Kelesi successfully recovered and began coaching young children in Canada in the late 1990s. She also became a part-time tennis journalist and commentator.

== WTA career finals ==
=== Singles: 9 (2 titles, 7 runner-ups) ===
Legend Grand Slam tournaments (0–0) Tier I (0–0) Tier II (0–0) Tier III (0–1) Tier IV (0–3) Tier V (1–2) Virginia Slims (1–1)	Finals by surface Hard (1–3) Grass (0–0) Clay (1–4) Carpet (0–0)

Result	W/L	Date	Tournament	Surface	Opponent	Score
Loss	0–1	Aug 1985	VS Monticello, U.S.	Hard	(United States) Barbara Potter	6–4, 3–6, 2–6
Win	1–1	Oct 1986	Japan Open	Hard	(Argentina) Bettina Fulco	6–2, 6–2
Win	2–1	May 1988	Ilva Trophy, Italy	Clay	(Italy) Laura Garrone	6–1, 6–0
Loss	2–2	May 1988	Italian Open	Clay	(Argentina) Gabriela Sabatini	1–6, 7–6^{(7–4)}, 1–6
Loss	2–3	Aug 1988	Cincinnati Masters, U.S.	Hard	(United States) Barbara Potter	2–6, 2–6
Loss	2–4	Apr 1989	Barcelona Open, Spain	Clay	(Spain) Arantxa Sánchez Vicario	2–6, 7–5, 1–6
Loss	2–5	Nov 1989	VS Nashville, U.S.	Hard (I)	(Soviet Union) Leila Meskhi	2–6, 3–6
Loss	2–6	May 1990	Geneva, Switzerland	Clay	(Austria) Barbara Paulus	6–2, 5–7, 6–7^{(3–7)}
Loss	2–7	May 1991	Geneva, Switzerland	Clay	(Switzerland) Manuela Maleeva-Fragnière	3–6, 6–3, 3–6

=== Doubles: 5 (2 titles, 3 runner-ups) ===
Legend Grand Slam tournaments (0–0) Tier I (1–1) Tier II (0–0) Tier III (0–1) Tier IV (1–0) Tier V (0–1)	Finals by surface Hard (1–2) Grass (0–0) Clay (1–1) Carpet (0–0)

Result	W/L	Date	Tournament	Surface	Partner	Opponents	Score
Loss	0–1	May 1988	Ilva Trophy, Italy	Clay	(Italy) Laura Garrone	(West Germany) Andrea Betzner (West Germany) Claudia Porwik	1–6, 2–6
Loss	0–2	Aug 1988	Cincinnati Masters, U.S.	Hard	(United States) Lindsay Bartlett	(United States) Beth Herr (United States) Candy Reynolds	6–4, 6–7^{(9–11)}, 1–6
Win	1–2	May 1990	Italian Open	Clay	(Socialist Federal Republic of Yugoslavia) Monica Seles	(Italy) Laura Garrone (Italy) Laura Golarsa	6–3, 6–4
Loss	1–3	Aug 1990	Canadian Open	Hard	(Italy) Raffaella Reggi	(United States) Betsy Nagelsen (Argentina) Gabriela Sabatini	6–3, 2–6, 2–6
Win	2–3	Oct 1990	VS Scottsdale, U.S.	Hard	(United States) Elise Burgin	(United States) Sandy Collins (United States) Ronni Reis	6–4, 6–2

== ITF finals ==
$100,000 tournaments
$75,000 tournaments
$50,000 tournaments
$25,000 tournaments
$10,000 tournaments

=== Singles (3–0) ===
Result	Date	Tournament	Surface	Opponent	Score
Win	3 February 1991	ITF Midland, United States	Hard (i)	(United States) Meredith McGrath	6–2, 6–2
Win	27 January 1992	ITF Midland, United States	Hard (i)	(Netherlands) Claire Wegink	7–6^{(7–2)}, 7–6^{(10–8)}
Win	25 January 1993	ITF Austin, United States	Hard	(United States) Elly Hakami	6–4, 3–6, 6–2

=== Doubles (0–2) ===
Result	Date	Tournament	Surface	Partner	Opponents	
Loss	3 February 1991	ITF Midland, United States	Hard (i)	(United States) Katrina Adams	(United States) Anne Smith (United States) Meredith McGrath	5–7, 5–7
Loss	27 January 1992	ITF Midland, United States	Hard (i)	(Netherlands) Caroline Vis	(Netherlands) Manon Bollegraf (United States) Meredith McGrath	3–6, 1–6

== Grand Slam singles performance timeline ==
Key
W	F	SF	QF	#R	RR	Q#	DNQ	A	NH

(W) winner; (F) finalist; (SF) semifinalist; (QF) quarterfinalist; (#R) rounds 4, 3, 2, 1; (RR) round-robin stage; (Q#) qualification round; (DNQ) did not qualify; (A) absent; (NH) not held; (SR) strike rate (events won / competed); (W–L) win–loss record.

Tournament	1985	1986	1987	1988	1989	1990	1991	1992	1993	1994	1995	1996	1997	Career SR
Australian Open	A	NH	2R	A	A	3R	A	1R	A	2R	A	A	A	0 / 4
French Open	1R	1R	4R	QF	QF	2R	3R	A	1R	1R	A	A	A	0 / 9
Wimbledon	1R	2R	1R	1R	1R	1R	1R	A	3R	1R	A	A	A	0 / 9
US Open	1R	3R	3R	2R	1R	2R	2R	1R	1R	1R	A	A	A	0 / 10
SR	0 / 3	0 / 3	0 / 4	0 / 3	0 / 3	0 / 4	0 / 3	0 / 2	0 / 3	0 / 4	0 / 0	0 / 0	0 / 0	0 / 32
Year-end ranking	48	39	32	19	13	25	29	128	49	124	NR	NR	763	
