= 1992 Australian Open – Women's doubles =

Women's doubles
- 1992 Australian Open

Final
- Champion: (Spain) Arantxa Sánchez Vicario (Czechoslovakia) Helena Suková
- Runner-up: (United States) Mary Joe Fernández (United States) Zina Garrison
- Score: 6–4, 7–6^{(7–3)}

Details
- Draw: 64
- Seeds: 16

Events
Singles	men	women		boys	girls
Doubles	men	women	mixed	boys	girls
WC Singles	men	women	quad
WC Doubles	men	women	quad
Legends	men	women	mixed
- Australian Open

The women's doubles competition at the 1992 Australian Open was held between January 13 and 26, 1992 at the National Tennis Centre at Flinders Park in Melbourne, Australia. Arantxa Sánchez Vicario and Helena Suková won the title, defeating Mary Joe Fernández and Zina Garrison in the final.

== Seeds ==
1. (Czechoslovakia) Jana Novotná / (Latvia) Larisa Neiland (quarterfinals)
2. (United States) Pam Shriver / (Commonwealth of Independent States) Natasha Zvereva (semifinals)
3. (United States) Patty Fendick / (United States) Gigi Fernández (quarterfinals)
4. (Spain) Arantxa Sánchez Vicario / (Czechoslovakia) Helena Suková (champions)
5. (United States) Mary Joe Fernández / (United States) Zina Garrison (final)
6. (Canada) Jill Hetherington / (United States) Kathy Rinaldi (second round)
7. (United States) Lori McNeil / (Australia) Nicole Provis (third round)
8. (United States) Katrina Adams / (Netherlands) Manon Bollegraf (quarterfinals)
9. (Commonwealth of Independent States) Leila Meskhi / (Argentina) Mercedes Paz (third round)
10. (Belgium) Sabine Appelmans / (France) Isabelle Demongeot (third round)
11. (Germany) Claudia Kohde-Kilsch / (Austria) Judith Wiesner (third round)
12. (United States) Mary-Lou Daniels / (United States) Robin White (third round)
13. (South Africa) Rosalyn Fairbank-Nideffer / (South Africa) Lise Gregory (second round)
14. (Czechoslovakia) Andrea Strnadová / (France) Catherine Tanvier (second round)
15. (Australia) Rachel McQuillan / (Germany) Claudia Porwik (third round)
16. (United States) Stephanie Rehe / (Netherlands) Brenda Schultz (semifinals)

== Draw ==
Key

- Q = Qualifier
- WC = Wild card
- LL = Lucky loser
- Alt = Alternate
- ITF = ITF entry
- PR = Protected ranking
- SR = Special ranking
- SE = Special exempt
- JE = Junior exempt
- JR = Junior Accelerator Programme entrant
- CO = College Accelerator Programme entrant
- NG = Next Gen Accelerator Program entrant
- w/o = Walkover
- r = Retired
- d = Defaulted

=== Finals ===
Quarterfinals
1	(Czechoslovakia) Jana Novotná (Latvia) Larisa Neiland	6	2	6
5	(United States) Mary Joe Fernández (United States) Zina Garrison	2	6	8
3	(United States) Patty Fendick (United States) Gigi Fernández	6^{3}	0
16	(United States) Stephanie Rehe (Netherlands) Brenda Schultz	7^{7}	6
(Japan) Kimiko Date (Australia) Michelle Jaggard	2	4
4	(Spain) Arantxa Sánchez Vicario (Czechoslovakia) Helena Suková	6	6
8	(United States) Katrina Adams (Netherlands) Manon Bollegraf	5	5
2	(United States) Pam Shriver (Commonwealth of Independent States) Natasha Zvereva	7	7

Semifinals
5	(United States) Mary Joe Fernández (United States) Zina Garrison	6	6
16	(United States) Stephanie Rehe (Netherlands) Brenda Schultz	2	1
4	(Spain) Arantxa Sánchez Vicario (Czechoslovakia) Helena Suková	6	6
2	(United States) Pam Shriver (Commonwealth of Independent States) Natasha Zvereva	3	3

Final
5	(United States) Mary Joe Fernández (United States) Zina Garrison	4	6^{3}
4	(Spain) Arantxa Sánchez Vicario (Czechoslovakia) Helena Suková	6	7^{7}

=== Top half ===
==== Section 1 ====
First round
1	(Czechoslovakia) J Novotná (Latvia) L Neiland	7^{7}	3	7
(France) J Halard (Germany) A Huber	6^{0}	6	5
(Japan) A Kijimuta (Japan) A Nishiya	3	3
(United States) G Helgeson (United States) T Whitlinger	6	6
(Australia) T Morton (United Kingdom) C Wood	6	6
(United States) J Fuchs (Japan) N Miyagi	3	3
(United States) C Cunningham (Peru) L Gildemeister	7	3	2
13	(South Africa) R Fairbank-Nideffer (South Africa) L Gregory	5	6	6
9	(Commonwealth of Independent States) L Meskhi (Argentina) M Paz	6^{5}	7	6
(Bulgaria) K Maleeva (Commonwealth of Independent States) N Medvedeva	7^{7}	5	4
(Australia) J Hodder (Germany) C Schneider	4	5
(France) S Testud (France) N van Lottum	6	7
(Indonesia) Y Basuki (United Kingdom) J Durie	6	6
(Australia) C Barclay (Australia) J Taylor	0	1
(United States) D Graham (United States) K Po	4	4
5	(United States) MJ Fernández (United States) Z Garrison	6	6

Second round
1	(Czechoslovakia) J Novotná (Latvia) L Neiland	6	6
(United States) G Helgeson (United States) T Whitlinger	2	3
(Australia) T Morton (United Kingdom) C Wood	6	6
13	(South Africa) R Fairbank-Nideffer (South Africa) L Gregory	3	3
9	(Commonwealth of Independent States) L Meskhi (Argentina) M Paz	6	7^{7}
(France) S Testud (France) N van Lottum	4	6^{4}
(Indonesia) Y Basuki (United Kingdom) J Durie	2	6^{6}
5	(United States) MJ Fernández (United States) Z Garrison	6	7^{8}

Third round
1	(Czechoslovakia) J Novotná (Latvia) L Neiland	6	6
(Australia) T Morton (United Kingdom) C Wood	4	3
9	(Commonwealth of Independent States) L Meskhi (Argentina) M Paz	2	6^{5}
5	(United States) MJ Fernández (United States) Z Garrison	6	7^{7}

Quarterfinals
1	(Czechoslovakia) J Novotná (Latvia) L Neiland	6	2	6
5	(United States) MJ Fernández (United States) Z Garrison	2	6	8

==== Section 2 ====
First round
3	(United States) P Fendick (United States) G Fernández	6	7
(Australia) J Limmer (Australia) A Woolcock	3	5
(United States) A Henricksson (United States) H Ludloff	4	2
(Germany) M Babel (Germany) B Rittner	6	6
(United States) L Harvey-Wild (Germany) E Pfaff	5	7	6
(Argentina) I Gorrochategui (France) N Herreman	7	5	1
(United States) A Frazier (Japan) R Hiraki	3	3
11	(Germany) C Kohde-Kilsch (Austria) J Wiesner	6	6
16	(United States) S Rehe (Netherlands) B Schultz	6	3	6
(Mexico) L Novelo (Australia) K Radford	4	6	1
(France) A Dechaume (Argentina) F Labat	5	3
(Australia) J Byrne (Australia) L Stacey	7	6
(Japan) M Kidowaki (Sweden) C Lindqvist	6	3	4
(Japan) A Hirose (Japan) Y Kamio	1	6	6
(Argentina) P Tarabini (Hungary) A Temesvári	1	1
7	(United States) L McNeil (Australia) N Provis	6	6

Second round
3	(United States) P Fendick (United States) G Fernández	6	6
(Germany) M Babel (Germany) B Rittner	0	3
(United States) L Harvey-Wild (Germany) E Pfaff	7	2	1
11	(Germany) C Kohde-Kilsch (Austria) J Wiesner	5	6	6
16	(United States) S Rehe (Netherlands) B Schultz	6	6
(Australia) J Byrne (Australia) L Stacey	4	2
(Japan) A Hirose (Japan) Y Kamio	2	4
7	(United States) L McNeil (Australia) N Provis	6	6

Third round
3	(United States) P Fendick (United States) G Fernández	7^{7}	6
11	(Germany) C Kohde-Kilsch (Austria) J Wiesner	6^{3}	4
16	(United States) S Rehe (Netherlands) B Schultz	7	6
7	(United States) L McNeil (Australia) N Provis	5	3

Quarterfinals
3	(United States) P Fendick (United States) G Fernández	6^{3}	0
16	(United States) S Rehe (Netherlands) B Schultz	7^{7}	6

=== Bottom half ===
==== Section 3 ====
First round
6	(Canada) J Hetherington (United States) K Rinaldi	6	6
(Czechoslovakia) R Rajchrtová (Czechoslovakia) R Zrubáková	4	1
(Netherlands) I Driehuis (Australia) L Pleming	6^{3}	7^{7}	1
(Japan) K Date (Australia) M Jaggard	7^{7}	6^{5}	6
(Australia) L Field (Australia) A Minter	6	1	3
(United States) N Arendt (Canada) H Kelesi	4	6	6
(United States) D Faber (Finland) P Thorén	4	7^{8}	3
15	(Australia) R McQuillan (Germany) C Porwik	6	6^{6}	6
12	(United States) M-L Daniels (United States) R White	6	7^{7}
(United States) A Gooden (United States) C Kuhlman	4	6^{5}
(United States) C Benjamin (United States) D Scott	6	2	6
(Austria) M Maruska (Austria) P Ritter	3	6	4
(Argentina) B Fulco-Villella (Netherlands) N Muns-Jagerman	6	6
(Israel) I Berger (United Kingdom) S Smith	3	3
(Australia) J-A Faull (New Zealand) J Richardson	2	6	1
4	(Spain) A Sánchez Vicario (Czechoslovakia) H Suková	6	4	6

Second round
6	(Canada) J Hetherington (United States) K Rinaldi	4	2
(Japan) K Date (Australia) M Jaggard	6	6
(United States) N Arendt (Canada) H Kelesi	2	4
15	(Australia) R McQuillan (Germany) C Porwik	6	6
12	(United States) M-L Daniels (United States) R White	6	6
(United States) C Benjamin (United States) D Scott	4	2
(Argentina) B Fulco-Villella (Netherlands) N Muns-Jagerman	1	1
4	(Spain) A Sánchez Vicario (Czechoslovakia) H Suková	6	6

Third round
(Japan) K Date (Australia) M Jaggard	6	6^{5}	7
15	(Australia) R McQuillan (Germany) C Porwik	4	7^{7}	5
12	(United States) M-L Daniels (United States) R White	4	4
4	(Spain) A Sánchez Vicario (Czechoslovakia) H Suková	6	6

Quarterfinals
(Japan) K Date (Australia) M Jaggard	2	4
4	(Spain) A Sánchez Vicario (Czechoslovakia) H Suková	6	6

==== Section 4 ====
First round
8	(United States) K Adams (Netherlands) M Bollegraf	7^{7}	3	6
(Czechoslovakia) E Švíglerová (Czechoslovakia) D Szabová	6^{4}	6	2
(United States) P O'Reilly (United States) T O'Reilly	6	6
(United Kingdom) B Borneo (Australia) K-A Guse	2	4
(Bulgaria) M Maleeva (Switzerland) M Maleeva-Fragniere	3	6	6
(United States) L Glitz (United States) B Somerville	6	2	2
(Finland) N Dahlman (Germany) S Frankl	2	1
14	(Czechoslovakia) A Strnadová (France) C Tanvier	6	6
10	(Belgium) S Appelmans (France) I Demongeot	6	6
(Germany) S Hack (Germany) S Meier	0	2
(Canada) R Alter (Canada) P Hy	6	1	1
(Australia) K Godridge (Australia) N Pratt	3	6	6
(United States) S Stafford (United States) M Werdel	6	6
(Czechoslovakia) R Bobková (Czechoslovakia) K Habšudová	2	2
(Belgium) A Devries (Commonwealth of Independent States) Eugenia Maniokova	2	2
2	(United States) P Shriver (Commonwealth of Independent States) N Zvereva	6	6

Second round
8	(United States) K Adams (Netherlands) M Bollegraf	6	6
(United States) P O'Reilly (United States) T O'Reilly	2	2
(Bulgaria) M Maleeva (Switzerland) M Maleeva-Fragniere	7	7
14	(Czechoslovakia) A Strnadová (France) C Tanvier	5	5
10	(Belgium) S Appelmans (France) I Demongeot	7	6
(Australia) K Godridge (Australia) N Pratt	5	4
(United States) S Stafford (United States) M Werdel	5	4
2	(United States) P Shriver (Commonwealth of Independent States) N Zvereva	7	6

Third round
8	(United States) K Adams (Netherlands) M Bollegraf	4
(Bulgaria) M Maleeva (Switzerland) M Maleeva-Fragniere	5^{r}
10	(Belgium) S Appelmans (France) I Demongeot	5	6	6
2	(United States) P Shriver (Commonwealth of Independent States) N Zvereva	7	0	0

Quarterfinals
8	(United States) K Adams (Netherlands) M Bollegraf	5	5
2	(United States) P Shriver (Commonwealth of Independent States) N Zvereva	7	7
