= 1991 Australian Open – Women's doubles =

Women's doubles
- 1991 Australian Open

Final
- Champion: (United States) Patty Fendick (United States) Mary Joe Fernández
- Runner-up: (United States) Gigi Fernández (Czechoslovakia) Jana Novotná
- Score: 7–6^{(7–4)}, 6–1

Details
- Draw: 64
- Seeds: 16

Events
Singles	men	women		boys	girls
Doubles	men	women	mixed	boys	girls
WC Singles	men	women	quad
WC Doubles	men	women	quad
Legends	men	women	mixed
- Australian Open

Patty Fendick and Mary Joe Fernández won their first career Grand Slam title, defeating Gigi Fernández and Jana Novotná 7–6^{(7–4)}, 6–1 in the final.

== Seeds ==
1. (United States) Gigi Fernández / (Czechoslovakia) Jana Novotná (final)
2. (Spain) Arantxa Sánchez Vicario / (Czechoslovakia) Helena Suková (third round)
3. (Soviet Union) Larisa Savchenko / (Soviet Union) Natasha Zvereva (quarterfinals)
4. (United States) Patty Fendick / (United States) Mary Joe Fernández (champions)
5. (United States) Kathy Jordan / (Australia) Elizabeth Smylie (quarterfinals)
6. (United States) Gretchen Magers / (United States) Robin White (second round)
7. (Netherlands) Manon Bollegraf / (South Africa) Lise Gregory (quarterfinals)
8. (Argentina) Mercedes Paz / (Argentina) Gabriela Sabatini (third round)
9. (Australia) Nicole Provis / (South Africa) Elna Reinach (first round)
10. (Socialist Federal Republic of Yugoslavia) Monica Seles / (United States) Anne Smith (semifinals)
11. (United States) Elise Burgin / (South Africa) Rosalyn Fairbank-Nideffer (third round)
12. (Soviet Union) Elena Brioukhovets / (Soviet Union) Natalia Medvedeva (first round)
13. (Germany) Claudia Kohde-Kilsch / (Netherlands) Brenda Schultz (first round)
14. (Australia) Jo-Anne Faull / (Australia) Michelle Jaggard (third round)
15. (United Kingdom) Jo Durie / (Australia) Louise Field (first round)
16. (Bulgaria) Katerina Maleeva / (Bulgaria) Magdalena Maleeva (first round)

== Draw ==
Key

- Q = Qualifier
- WC = Wild card
- LL = Lucky loser
- Alt = Alternate
- ITF = ITF entry
- PR = Protected ranking
- SR = Special ranking
- SE = Special exempt
- JE = Junior exempt
- JR = Junior Accelerator Programme entrant
- CO = College Accelerator Programme entrant
- NG = Next Gen Accelerator Program entrant
- w/o = Walkover
- r = Retired
- d = Defaulted

=== Finals ===
Quarterfinals
1	(United States) Gigi Fernández (Czechoslovakia) Jana Novotná	6	6^{4}	6
(Belgium) Sabine Appelmans (Italy) Raffaella Reggi	4	7^{7}	3
3	(Soviet Union) Larisa Savchenko (Soviet Union) Natasha Zvereva	6	3	4
(Canada) Jill Hetherington (United States) Kathy Rinaldi	2	6	6
7	(Netherlands) Manon Bollegraf (South Africa) Lise Gregory	4	4
4	(United States) Patty Fendick (United States) Mary Joe Fernández	6	6
5	(United States) Kathy Jordan (Australia) Elizabeth Smylie	6	0	8
10	(Socialist Federal Republic of Yugoslavia) Monica Seles (United States) Anne Smith	4	6	10

Semifinals
1	(United States) Gigi Fernández (Czechoslovakia) Jana Novotná	6	3	8
(Canada) Jill Hetherington (United States) Kathy Rinaldi	0	6	6
4	(United States) Patty Fendick (United States) Mary Joe Fernández	6	3	6
10	(Socialist Federal Republic of Yugoslavia) Monica Seles (United States) Anne Smith	1	6	2

Final
1	(United States) Gigi Fernández (Czechoslovakia) Jana Novotná	6^{4}	1
4	(United States) Patty Fendick (United States) Mary Joe Fernández	7^{7}	6

=== Top half ===
==== Section 1 ====
First round
1	(United States) G Fernández (Czechoslovakia) J Novotná	6	6
(Czechoslovakia) P Langrová (Czechoslovakia) J Pospíšilová	3	2
(Australia) R McQuillan (France) C Tanvier	2	6	3
(United States) Z Garrison-Jackson (United States) P Shriver	6	3	6
(France) A Dechaume (France) N Herreman	4	3
(Japan) M Kidowaki (Australia) A Scott	6	6
(United States) L Harvey-Wild (Argentina) P Tarabini	3	2
14	(Australia) J-A Faull (Australia) M Jaggard	6	6
16	(Bulgaria) K Maleeva (Bulgaria) Mag Maleeva	4	2
(Belgium) S Appelmans (Italy) R Reggi	6	6
(Belgium) A Devries (Netherlands) I Driehuis	7	7^{7}
(Canada) P Hy (New Zealand) C Toleafoa	5	6^{3}
(Sweden) M Lindström (United States) H Ludloff	6	5	6
(Australia) K-A Guse (Australia) J Hodder	0	7	2
(Australia) K McDonald (Australia) L Pleming	1	1
8	(Argentina) M Paz (Argentina) G Sabatini	6	6

Second round
1	(United States) G Fernández (Czechoslovakia) J Novotná	6	3	6
(United States) Z Garrison-Jackson (United States) P Shriver	3	6	1
(Japan) M Kidowaki (Australia) A Scott	6	3	3
14	(Australia) J-A Faull (Australia) M Jaggard	3	6	6
(Belgium) S Appelmans (Italy) R Reggi	6	6
(Belgium) A Devries (Netherlands) I Driehuis	3	3
(Sweden) M Lindström (United States) H Ludloff	5	1
8	(Argentina) M Paz (Argentina) G Sabatini	7	6

Third round
1	(United States) G Fernández (Czechoslovakia) J Novotná	6	6
14	(Australia) J-A Faull (Australia) M Jaggard	4	2
(Belgium) S Appelmans (Italy) R Reggi	6	2	6
8	(Argentina) M Paz (Argentina) G Sabatini	4	6	2

Quarterfinals
1	(United States) G Fernández (Czechoslovakia) J Novotná	6	6^{4}	6
(Belgium) S Appelmans (Italy) R Reggi	3	7^{7}	3

==== Section 2 ====
First round
3	(Soviet Union) L Savchenko (Soviet Union) N Zvereva	6	6
(Germany) E Pfaff (Australia) R Stubbs	3	3
(Germany) S Meier (Czechoslovakia) D Szabová	3	5
(Czechoslovakia) A Strnadová (Czechoslovakia) E Švíglerová	6	7
(United States) A Frazier (United States) A Grossman	4	3
(Australia) K Godridge (Australia) K Sharpe	6	6
(Germany) S Hack (Japan) A Nishiya	2	6	8
9	(Australia) N Provis (South Africa) E Reinach	6	2	6
12	(Soviet Union) E Brioukhovets (Soviet Union) N Medvedeva	7^{7}	6^{2}	2
(France) N van Lottum (United Kingdom) C Wood	6^{4}	7^{7}	6
WC	(Australia) L Keller (Australia) R Mawdsley	3	6^{3}
(Italy) C Caverzasio (Belgium) S Wasserman	6	7^{7}
(Indonesia) Y Basuki (Indonesia) S Wibowo	6^{2}	5
(Canada) J Hetherington (United States) K Rinaldi	7^{7}	7
WC	(Australia) J Limmer (Australia) A Woolcock	0	3
6	(United States) G Magers (United States) R White	6	6

Second round
3	(Soviet Union) L Savchenko (Soviet Union) N Zvereva	6	4	6
(Czechoslovakia) A Strnadová (Czechoslovakia) E Švíglerová	2	6	2
(Australia) K Godridge (Australia) K Sharpe	6	4	7
(Germany) S Hack (Japan) A Nishiya	3	6	5
(France) N van Lottum (United Kingdom) C Wood	1	6	2
(Italy) C Caverzasio (Belgium) S Wasserman	6	2	6
(Canada) J Hetherington (United States) K Rinaldi	6	6
6	(United States) G Magers (United States) R White	3	3

Third round
3	(Soviet Union) L Savchenko (Soviet Union) N Zvereva	6	6
(Australia) K Godridge (Australia) K Sharpe	1	2
(Italy) C Caverzasio (Belgium) S Wasserman	0	6	3
(Canada) J Hetherington (United States) K Rinaldi	6	2	6

Quarterfinals
3	(Soviet Union) L Savchenko (Soviet Union) N Zvereva	6	3	4
(Canada) J Hetherington (United States) K Rinaldi	2	6	6

=== Bottom half ===
==== Section 3 ====
First round
7	(Netherlands) M Bollegraf (South Africa) L Gregory	6	6
WC	(Germany) A Huber (Germany) B Rittner	0	0
(United States) E Hakami (Peru) P Vásquez	6^{11}	6^{3}
(Australia) A Minter (Australia) T Morton	7^{13}	7^{7}
(Australia) D Jones (Australia) C Thompson	7	2	4
(United Kingdom) B Borneo (United Kingdom) J Salmon	5	6	6
(United States) B Bowes (United States) S Stafford	5	2
11	(United States) E Burgin (South Africa) R Fairbank-Nideffer	7	6
13	(Germany) C Kohde-Kilsch (Netherlands) B Schultz	4	4
(Switzerland) M Maleeva-Fragniere (United States) L McNeil	6	6
(United States) A Leand (United Kingdom) S Loosemore	2	4
(Australia) L Stacey (Australia) J Taylor	6	6
(Germany) C Porwik (Germany) W Probst	0	3
(New Zealand) B Cordwell (New Zealand) J Richardson	6	6
(Australia) C Barclay (Australia) N Pratt	1	2
4	(United States) P Fendick (United States) MJ Fernández	6	6

Second round
7	(Netherlands) M Bollegraf (South Africa) L Gregory	6	6
(Australia) A Minter (Australia) T Morton	2	4
(United Kingdom) B Borneo (United Kingdom) J Salmon	1	1
11	(United States) E Burgin (South Africa) R Fairbank-Nideffer	6	6
(Switzerland) M Maleeva-Fragniere (United States) L McNeil	w/o
(Australia) L Stacey (Australia) J Taylor
(New Zealand) B Cordwell (New Zealand) J Richardson	0	0
4	(United States) P Fendick (United States) MJ Fernández	6	6

Third round
7	(Netherlands) M Bollegraf (South Africa) L Gregory	5	6	11
11	(United States) E Burgin (South Africa) R Fairbank-Nideffer	7	4	9
(Switzerland) M Maleeva-Fragniere (United States) L McNeil	2	2
4	(United States) P Fendick (United States) MJ Fernández	6	6

Quarterfinals
7	(Netherlands) M Bollegraf (South Africa) L Gregory	4	4
4	(United States) P Fendick (United States) MJ Fernández	6	6

==== Section 4 ====
First round
5	(United States) K Jordan (Australia) E Smylie	6	6
(Soviet Union) E Maniokova (Soviet Union) V Milvidskaia	2	2
(United States) D Faber (Finland) P Thorén	6	0	7
(Finland) N Dahlman (Sweden) M Ekstrand	3	6	5
(United States) L Antonoplis (United Kingdom) M Javer	4	1
(United States) S Collins (United States) T Whitlinger	6	6
(United States) A Henricksson (United States) Cam MacGregor	7^{7}	6
15	(United Kingdom) J Durie (Australia) L Field	6^{3}	3
10	(Socialist Federal Republic of Yugoslavia) M Seles (United States) A Smith	6	6
(Peru) L Gildemeister (Sweden) C Lindqvist	1	1
(Australia) K Radford (United States) J Smoller	7	6
(France) S Amiach (Sweden) M Strandlund	5	2
(United States) R Baranski (United States) L Seemann	6	7^{7}
(Germany) K Kschwendt (Czechoslovakia) R Rajchrtová	4	6^{5}
(United States) A May (Japan) N Miyagi	1	1
2	(Spain) A Sánchez Vicario (Czechoslovakia) H Suková	6	6

Second round
5	(United States) K Jordan (Australia) E Smylie	6	6
(United States) D Faber (Finland) P Thorén	2	1
(United States) S Collins (United States) T Whitlinger	3	6^{3}
(United States) A Henricksson (United States) Cam MacGregor	6	7^{7}
10	(Socialist Federal Republic of Yugoslavia) M Seles (United States) A Smith	6	7
(Australia) K Radford (United States) J Smoller	2	5
(United States) R Baranski (United States) L Seemann	0	0
2	(Spain) A Sánchez Vicario (Czechoslovakia) H Suková	6	6

Third round
5	(United States) K Jordan (Australia) E Smylie	6	6
(United States) A Henricksson (United States) Cam MacGregor	2	3
10	(Socialist Federal Republic of Yugoslavia) M Seles (United States) A Smith	7	3	6
2	(Spain) A Sánchez Vicario (Czechoslovakia) H Suková	5	6	2

Quarterfinals
5	(United States) K Jordan (Australia) E Smylie	6	0	8
10	(Socialist Federal Republic of Yugoslavia) M Seles (United States) A Smith	4	6	10
