= 1993 Australian Open – Women's doubles =

Women's doubles
- 1993 Australian Open

Final
- Champion: (United States) Gigi Fernández; (Belarus) Natasha Zvereva
- Runner-up: (United States) Pam Shriver; (Australia) Elizabeth Smylie
- Score: 6–4, 6–3

Details
- Draw: 64
- Seeds: 16

Events
Singles	men	women		boys	girls
Doubles	men	women	mixed	boys	girls
WC Singles	men	women	quad
WC Doubles	men	women	quad
Legends	men	women	mixed
- Australian Open

The women's doubles competition at the 1993 Australian Open was held between 18 January and 31 January 1993 on outdoor hard courts at the National Tennis Centre at Flinders Park in Melbourne, Australia. Gigi Fernández and Natasha Zvereva won the title, defeating Pam Shriver and Elizabeth Smylie in the final.

== Seeds ==
1. (United States) Gigi Fernández / (Belarus) Natasha Zvereva (champions)
2. (Latvia) Larisa Neiland / (Czechoslovakia) Jana Novotná (quarterfinals)
3. (Spain) Conchita Martínez / (Spain) Arantxa Sánchez Vicario (quarterfinals)
4. (United States) Mary Joe Fernández / (United States) Zina Garrison-Jackson (quarterfinals)
5. (United States) Lori McNeil / (Australia) Rennae Stubbs (quarterfinals)
6. (Canada) Jill Hetherington / (United States) Kathy Rinaldi (semifinals)
7. (United States) Katrina Adams / (Netherlands) Manon Bollegraf (third round)
8. (United States) Patty Fendick / (Czechoslovakia) Andrea Strnadová (semifinals)
9. (Australia) Nicole Provis / (South Africa) Elna Reinach (first round)
10. (United States) Pam Shriver / (Australia) Elizabeth Smylie (final)
11. (Australia) Rachel McQuillan / (Germany) Claudia Porwik (second round)
12. (United States) Sandy Collins / (France) Mary Pierce (first round)
13. (South Africa) Rosalyn Fairbank-Nideffer / (New Zealand) Julie Richardson (third round)
14. (Belgium) Sabine Appelmans / (France) Isabelle Demongeot (first round)
15. (Argentina) Florencia Labat / (Argentina) Patricia Tarabini (third round)
16. (Bulgaria) Katerina Maleeva / (France) Nathalie Tauziat (third round)

== Draw ==
Key

- Q = Qualifier
- WC = Wild card
- LL = Lucky loser
- Alt = Alternate
- ITF = ITF entry
- PR = Protected ranking
- SR = Special ranking
- SE = Special exempt
- JE = Junior exempt
- JR = Junior Accelerator Programme entrant
- CO = College Accelerator Programme entrant
- NG = Next Gen Accelerator Program entrant
- w/o = Walkover
- r = Retired
- d = Defaulted

=== Finals ===
Quarterfinals

Semifinals

Final

1
(United States) Gigi Fernández
(Belarus) Natasha Zvereva
6
6

5
- (United States) Lori McNeil
- (Australia) Rennae Stubbs
3
1

1
(United States) Gigi Fernández
(Belarus) Natasha Zvereva
6
7

8
- (United States) Patty Fendick
- (Czechoslovakia) Andrea Strnadová
2
5

4
- (United States) Mary Joe Fernández
- (United States) Zina Garrison-Jackson
2
2

8
(United States) Patty Fendick
(Czechoslovakia) Andrea Strnadová
6
6

1
(United States) Gigi Fernández
(Belarus) Natasha Zvereva
6
6

10
- (United States) Pam Shriver
- (Australia) Elizabeth Smylie
4
3

6
(Canada) Jill Hetherington
(United States) Kathy Rinaldi
4
6
6

3
- (Spain) Conchita Martínez
- (Spain) Arantxa Sánchez Vicario
6
1
0

6
- (Canada) Jill Hetherington
- (United States) Kathy Rinaldi
4
6
3

10
(United States) Pam Shriver
(Australia) Elizabeth Smylie
6
1
6

10
(United States) Pam Shriver
(Australia) Elizabeth Smylie
6
6

2
- (Latvia) Larisa Neiland
- (Czechoslovakia) Jana Novotná
3
3

=== Top half ===
==== Section 1 ====
First round

Second round

Third round

Quarterfinals

1
(United States) G Fernández
(Belarus) N Zvereva
6
6

- (United States) L Glitz
- (United States) J Santrock
2
3

1
(United States) G Fernández
(Belarus) N Zvereva
6^{4}
7
6

(Australia) L Pleming
(France) S Testud
6
4
6

- (Australia) L Pleming
- (France) S Testud
7
5
2

- (United States) A Grossman
- (Hungary) A Temesvári
3
6
1

1
(United States) G Fernández
(Belarus) N Zvereva
6
6

(United States) A Frazier
(Japan) R Hiraki
6
6

13
- (South Africa) R Fairbank-Nideffer
- (New Zealand) J Richardson
4
0

- (Austria) J Wiesner
- (Czechoslovakia) R Zrubáková
4
4

- (United States) A Frazier
- (Japan) R Hiraki
3
2

- (Australia) C Barclay
- (Australia) L Stacey
5
2

13
(South Africa) R Fairbank-Nideffer
(New Zealand) J Richardson
6
6

13
(South Africa) R Fairbank-Nideffer
(New Zealand) J Richardson
7
6

1
(United States) G Fernández
(Belarus) N Zvereva
6
6

9
- (Australia) N Provis
- (South Africa) E Reinach
2
6
1

5
- (United States) L McNeil
- (Australia) R Stubbs
3
1

(Argentina) I Gorrochategui
(United States) L Harvey-Wild
6
3
6

(Argentina) I Gorrochategui
(United States) L Harvey-Wild
6
3
6

- (United States) J Fuchs
- (Sweden) M Strandlund
3
4

- (Netherlands) M Kiene
- (Netherlands) M Oremans
0
6
1

(Netherlands) M Kiene
(Netherlands) M Oremans
6
6

- (Argentina) I Gorrochategui
- (United States) L Harvey-Wild
3
6^{6}

(United States) Ca MacGregor
(United States) S Stafford
6
6

5
(United States) L McNeil
(Australia) R Stubbs
6
7

- (Australia) J Byrne
- (Australia) JA Faull
3
3

- (United States) Ca MacGregor
- (United States) S Stafford
3
4

- (Netherlands) N Krijger-Jagerman
- (Germany) W Probst
4
4

5
(United States) L McNeil
(Australia) R Stubbs
6
6

5
(United States) L McNeil
(Australia) R Stubbs
6
6

==== Section 2 ====
First round

Second round

Third round

Quarterfinals

4
(United States) MJ Fernández
(United States) Z Garrison-Jackson
6
6

Alt
- (Poland) M Mróz
- (Poland) K Teodorowicz
2
4

4
(United States) MJ Fernández
(United States) Z Garrison-Jackson
6
6

- (United States) C Kuhlman
- (Mexico) L Novelo
3
2

WC
- (Bulgaria) M Maleeva
- (Switzerland) M Maleeva-Fragnière
4
2

WC
(Bulgaria) M Maleeva
(Switzerland) M Maleeva-Fragnière
6
6

4
(United States) MJ Fernández
(United States) Z Garrison-Jackson
6
6

- (Japan) A Hirose
- (Japan) N Kijimuta
2
5

- (Indonesia) Y Basuki
- (Japan) N Miyagi
2
2

(United States) S McCarthy
(United States) K Po
6
7

- (United States) S McCarthy
- (United States) K Po
3
7
6

(Indonesia) Y Basuki
(Japan) N Miyagi
6
6

(Indonesia) Y Basuki
(Japan) N Miyagi
6
5
8

12
- (United States) S Collins
- (France) M Pierce
6^{2}
2

4
- (United States) MJ Fernández
- (United States) Z Garrison-Jackson
2
2

15
(Argentina) F Labat
(Argentina) P Tarabini
3
6
6

8
(United States) P Fendick
(Czechoslovakia) A Strnadová
6
6

- (France) J Halard
- (Germany) A Huber
6
2
4

15
(Argentina) F Labat
(Argentina) P Tarabini
w/o

(Canada) P Hy
(United States) S Rehe
6
6

- (Canada) P Hy
- (United States) S Rehe

- (Australia) K Godridge
- (United States) P O'Reilly
3
3

15
- (Argentina) F Labat
- (Argentina) P Tarabini
4
4

- (United States) N Arendt
- (Germany) M Babel
6^{5}
4

8
(United States) P Fendick
(Czechoslovakia) A Strnadová
6
6

(Australia) J Hodder
(Australia) A Woolcock
7
6

- (Australia) J Hodder
- (Australia) A Woolcock
2
3

- (Georgia (country)) L Meskhi
- (Germany) B Rittner
1
5

8
(United States) P Fendick
(Czechoslovakia) A Strnadová
6
6

8
(United States) P Fendick
(Czechoslovakia) A Strnadová
6
7

=== Bottom half ===
==== Section 3 ====
First round

Second round

Third round

Quarterfinals

6
(Canada) J Hetherington
(United States) K Rinaldi
6
6

- (Japan) E Iida
- (Australia) K Radford
3
3

6
(Canada) J Hetherington
(United States) K Rinaldi
7
6

(Australia) T Morton
(United Kingdom) C Wood
6
6

- (Australia) T Morton
- (United Kingdom) C Wood
6^{5}
2

- (Germany) S Lohmann
- (Germany) V Martinek
2
1

6
(Canada) J Hetherington
(United States) K Rinaldi
6
6

(Japan) K Date
(Australia) M Jaggard-Lai
7
6

- (Japan) K Date
- (Australia) M Jaggard-Lai
3
3

- (United States) C Benjamin
- (Finland) P Thorén
5
1

(Japan) K Date
(Australia) M Jaggard-Lai
w/o

- (Peru) L Gildemeister
- (Czechoslovakia) K Habšudová
3
2

11
- (Australia) R McQuillan
- (Germany) C Porwik

11
(Australia) R McQuillan
(Germany) C Porwik
6
6

6
(Canada) J Hetherington
(United States) K Rinaldi
4
6
6

16
(Bulgaria) K Maleeva
(France) N Tauziat
3
6
6

3
- (Spain) C Martínez
- (Spain) A Sánchez Vicario
6
1
0

WC
- (Australia) M Avotins
- (Australia) D Jones
6
2
1

16
(Bulgaria) K Maleeva
(France) N Tauziat
6
6

- (Italy) N Baudone
- (Argentina) B Fulco-Villella
3
2

WC
- (Australia) J Limmer
- (Australia) K McDonald
4
3

WC
(Australia) J Limmer
(Australia) K McDonald
6
6

16
- (Bulgaria) K Maleeva
- (France) N Tauziat
3
0^{r}

- (Germany) K Kschwendt
- (Czechoslovakia) P Langrová
2
2

3
(Spain) C Martínez
(Spain) A Sánchez Vicario
6
3

(United States) B Bowes
(United States) T Whittington
6
6

- (United States) B Bowes
- (United States) T Whittington
2
3

- (Netherlands) I Driehuis
- (France) N van Lottum
4
2

3
(Spain) C Martínez
(Spain) A Sánchez Vicario
6
6

3
(Spain) C Martínez
(Spain) A Sánchez Vicario
6
6

==== Section 4 ====
First round

Second round

Third round

Quarterfinals

7
(United States) K Adams
(Netherlands) M Bollegraf
6
6

- (Italy) L Golarsa
- (France) N Herreman
1
2

7
(United States) K Adams
(Netherlands) M Bollegraf
6
6

(Australia) N Pratt
(Australia) K Sharpe
6
7

- (Australia) N Pratt
- (Australia) K Sharpe
4
4

- (Japan) M Kidowaki
- (Japan) N Sawamatsu
3
6^{5}

7
- (United States) K Adams
- (Netherlands) M Bollegraf
3
2

(France) A Fusai
(Switzerland) N Tschan
6
6

10
(United States) P Shriver
(Australia) E Smylie
6
6

WC
- (Australia) KA Guse
- (South Africa) T Price
4
1

- (France) A Fusai
- (Switzerland) N Tschan
4
1

- (United States) D Graham
- (United States) R White
5
0

10
(United States) P Shriver
(Australia) E Smylie
6
6

10
(United States) P Shriver
(Australia) E Smylie
7
6

10
(United States) P Shriver
(Australia) E Smylie
6
6

14
- (Belgium) S Appelmans
- (France) I Demongeot
7
4
3

2
- (Latvia) L Neiland
- (Czechoslovakia) J Novotná
3
3

(Austria) S Dopfer
(Germany) M Živec-Škulj
6^{5}
6
6

- (Austria) S Dopfer
- (Germany) M Živec-Škulj
3
1

- (Canada) R Simpson-Alter
- (United States) T Whitlinger
5
1

(United States) L Davenport
(United States) C Rubin
6
6

(United States) L Davenport
(United States) C Rubin
7
6

- (United States) L Davenport
- (United States) C Rubin
6
4
7

Alt
- (Japan) M Miyauchi
- (Japan) A Sugiyama
3
6^{4}

2
(Latvia) L Neiland
(Czechoslovakia) J Novotná
4
6
9

(United States) J Emmons
(United States) G Helgeson
6
7

- (United States) J Emmons
- (United States) G Helgeson
6
5
2

- (South Africa) A Coetzer
- (Australia) L Field
6
6^{5}
1

2
(Latvia) L Neiland
(Czechoslovakia) J Novotná
3
7
6

2
(Latvia) L Neiland
(Czechoslovakia) J Novotná
2
7
6
