= 1990 French Open – Women's singles =

Women's singles
- 1990 French Open

Final
- Champion: (Socialist Federal Republic of Yugoslavia) Monica Seles
- Runner-up: (West Germany) Steffi Graf
- Score: 7–6^{(8–6)}, 6–4

Details
- Draw: 128
- Seeds: 16

Events
Singles	men	women		boys	girls
Doubles	men	women	mixed	boys	girls
WC Singles	men	women	quad
WC Doubles	men	women	quad
Legends	−45	45+	women
- French Open

Monica Seles defeated Steffi Graf in the final, 7–6^{(8–6)}, 6–4 to win the women's singles tennis title at the 1990 French Open. Aged 16 years, 190 days, she became the youngest major singles champion in the Open Era at the time, and remains the youngest French Open champion in history. It was Graf’s 13th consecutive major final (dating to the 1987 French Open), an Open Era record.

Arantxa Sánchez Vicario was the defending champion, but she lost in the second round to Mercedes Paz. Between 1987 and 2000, this would be the only time she lost before the quarterfinals.

This tournament marked the major debut for future world No. 1, Olympic gold medalist, three-time major champion, and future French Open champion Jennifer Capriati. Aged 14 years, 70 days only, she became the youngest tennis player ever to reach the French Open semifinals and, following the tournament, the youngest-ever player to be ranked in the top ten.

== Seeds ==
1. (West Germany) Steffi Graf (final)
2. (Socialist Federal Republic of Yugoslavia) Monica Seles (champion)
3. (Spain) Arantxa Sánchez Vicario (second round)
4. (Argentina) Gabriela Sabatini (fourth round)
5. (United States) Zina Garrison (first round)
6. (Switzerland) Manuela Maleeva-Fragnière (quarterfinals)
7. (United States) Mary Joe Fernández (quarterfinals)
8. (Bulgaria) Katerina Maleeva (quarterfinals)
9. (Spain) Conchita Martínez (quarterfinals)
10. (Soviet Union) Natasha Zvereva (fourth round)
11. (Czechoslovakia) Jana Novotná (semifinals)
12. (Austria) Judith Wiesner (third round)
13. (South Africa) Rosalyn Fairbank-Nideffer (first round)
14. (Italy) Raffaella Reggi (second round)
15. (France) Nathalie Tauziat (fourth round)
16. (Peru) Laura Gildemeister (fourth round)

== Draw ==
Key

- Q = Qualifier
- WC = Wild card
- LL = Lucky loser
- Alt = Alternate
- ITF = ITF entry
- PR = Protected ranking
- SR = Special ranking
- SE = Special exempt
- JE = Junior exempt
- JR = Junior Accelerator Programme entrant
- CO = College Accelerator Programme entrant
- NG = Next Gen Accelerator Program entrant
- w/o = Walkover
- r = Retired
- d = Defaulted

=== Finals ===
Quarterfinals
1	(West Germany) Steffi Graf	6	6
9	(Spain) Conchita Martínez	1	3
11	(Czechoslovakia) Jana Novotná	4	6	6
8	(Bulgaria) Katerina Maleeva	6	2	4
7	(United States) Mary Joe Fernández	2	4
(United States) Jennifer Capriati	6	6
6	(Switzerland) Manuela Maleeva-Fragnière	6	1	5
2	(Socialist Federal Republic of Yugoslavia) Monica Seles	3	6	7

Semifinals
1	(West Germany) Steffi Graf	6	6
11	(Czechoslovakia) Jana Novotná	1	2
(United States) Jennifer Capriati	2	2
2	(Socialist Federal Republic of Yugoslavia) Monica Seles	6	6

Final
1	(West Germany) Steffi Graf	6^{6}	4
2	(Socialist Federal Republic of Yugoslavia) Monica Seles	7^{8}	6

=== Top half ===
==== Section 1 ====
First round
1	(West Germany) S Graf	6	6
(France) P Paradis	0	2
LL	(United States) J Santrock	6	6
(United Kingdom) S Loosemore	2	4
(France) S Amiach	7	6^{5}	6
(Argentina) F Haumüller	5	7^{7}	2
WC	(France) N Guerrée	5	0
(Italy) A-M Cecchini	7	6
(Austria) B Reinstadler	4	2
(Italy) L Lapi	6	6
(United Kingdom) M Javer	4	6	7
(Greece) A Kanellopoulou	6	4	5
(Switzerland) E Krapl	0	1
(West Germany) S Hack	6	6
(Australia) K Godridge	3	5
15	(France) N Tauziat	6	7

Second round
1	(West Germany) S Graf	6	6
LL	(United States) J Santrock	1	2
(France) S Amiach	2	1
(Italy) A-M Cecchini	6	6
(Italy) L Lapi	6	6
(United Kingdom) M Javer	1	1
(West Germany) S Hack	2	6	3
15	(France) N Tauziat	6	3	6

Third round
1	(West Germany) S Graf	6	6
(Italy) A-M Cecchini	2	3
(Italy) L Lapi	1	6	1
15	(France) N Tauziat	6	2	6

Fourth round
1	(West Germany) S Graf	6	6
15	(France) N Tauziat	1	4

==== Section 2 ====
First round
9	(Spain) C Martínez	7	6
(Australia) J Tremelling	5	1
WC	(France) P Etchemendy	7	6
(South Africa) E Reinach	5	1
(Sweden) M Strandlund	6	3	6
(Belgium) S Wasserman	3	6	0
(Czechoslovakia) R Zrubáková	6	6
(West Germany) S Meier	1	2
(United States) C Benjamin	7^{7}	6
Q	(Austria) P Ritter	6^{3}	1
(United States) H Na	0	7^{7}	6
Q	(Poland) K Nowak	6	6^{5}	2
(Czechoslovakia) J Pospíšilová	3	1
(Italy) B Romanò	6	6
(West Germany) W Probst	6	1	7
5	(United States) Z Garrison	1	6	5

Second round
9	(Spain) C Martínez	7^{7}	6
WC	(France) P Etchemendy	6^{1}	3
(Sweden) M Strandlund	1	6^{0}
(Czechoslovakia) R Zrubáková	6	7^{7}
(United States) C Benjamin	7^{7}	6
(United States) H Na	6^{2}	3
(Italy) B Romanò	2	6	5
(West Germany) W Probst	6	4	7

Third round
9	(Spain) C Martínez	6	6
(Czechoslovakia) R Zrubáková	1	3
(United States) C Benjamin	2	2
(West Germany) W Probst	6	6

Fourth round
9	(Spain) C Martínez	6	6
(West Germany) W Probst	3	3

==== Section 3 ====
First round
4	(Argentina) G Sabatini	6	7^{7}
(Brazil) A Vieira	0	6^{4}
(United States) S Sloane	6	6
(South Africa) A Coetzer	4	3
(Japan) N Sawamatsu	6	4	6
(United States) L Harvey-Wild	1	6	2
WC	(France) M Laval	3	3
(France) N Herreman	6	6
(South Africa) D Van Rensburg	6	6
(Italy) S La Fratta	4	2
(United States) K Rinaldi	2	5	r
(Czechoslovakia) K Švíglerová	6	5
(Italy) L Garrone	4	6^{9}
(Netherlands) B Schultz	6	7^{11}
(France) I Demongeot	0	7^{8}	8
11	(Czechoslovakia) J Novotná	6	6^{6}	10

Second round
4	(Argentina) G Sabatini	6	5	6
(United States) S Sloane	0	7	1
(Japan) N Sawamatsu	1	3
(France) N Herreman	6	6
(South Africa) D Van Rensburg	3	5
(Czechoslovakia) E Švíglerová	6	7
(Netherlands) B Schultz	3	1
11	(Czechoslovakia) J Novotná	6	6

Third round
4	(Argentina) G Sabatini	6	6
(France) N Herreman	0	1
(Czechoslovakia) E Švíglerová	5	2
11	(Czechoslovakia) J Novotná	7	6

Fourth round
4	(Argentina) G Sabatini	4	5
11	(Czechoslovakia) J Novotná	6	7

==== Section 4 ====
First round
13	(South Africa) R Fairbank-Nideffer	1	2
(Canada) R Simpson	6	6
(Sweden) C Dahlman	2	1
(Hungary) A Temesvári	6	6
WC	(France) S Sabas	3	3
(Bulgaria) E Pampoulova	6	6
(Australia) E Smylie	1	3
(Australia) N Provis	6	6
(United States) B Bowes	3	6	2
(Soviet Union) N Medvedeva	6	3	6
(United States) B Nagelsen	1	4
(France) J Halard	6	6
(United States) D Faber	7	7
(Czechoslovakia) P Langrová	5	5
(Belgium) S Appelmans	3	3
8	(Bulgaria) K Maleeva	6	6

Second round
(Canada) R Simpson	6^{5}	2
(Hungary) A Temesvári	7^{7}	6
(Bulgaria) E Pampoulova	4	2
(Australia) N Provis	6	6
(Soviet Union) N Medvedeva	2	6	4
(France) J Halard	6	4	6
(United States) D Faber	5	1
8	(Bulgaria) K Maleeva	7	6

Third round
(Hungary) A Temesvári	6	3	3
(Australia) N Provis	2	6	6
(France) J Halard	2	1
8	(Bulgaria) K Maleeva	6	6

Fourth round
(Australia) N Provis	6	3	3
8	(Bulgaria) K Maleeva	3	6	6

=== Bottom half ===
==== Section 5 ====
First round
7	(United States) MJ Fernandez	6	6
Q	(Australia) K McDonald	4	2
WC	(France) M Pierce	6	6
(Argentina) B Fulco	0	1
(West Germany) S Hanika	6	6
(Japan) M Kidowaki	3	2
(West Germany) I Cueto	7^{12}	6
(Switzerland) E Zardo	6^{10}	0
(Socialist Federal Republic of Yugoslavia) S Goleš	0	2
(United States) A Grossman	6	6
(Japan) N Miyagi	6	1
(West Germany) M Pawlik	2	0	r
Q	(Australia) K Sharpe	6	6
(United States) T Phelps	3	3
(Mexico) A Gavaldón	6	6^{4}	2
14	(Italy) R Reggi	1	7^{7}	6

Second round
7	(United States) MJ Fernandez	6	6
WC	(France) M Pierce	4	4
(West Germany) S Hanika	3	6	0
(West Germany) I Cueto	6	4	6
(United States) A Grossman	6	6
(Japan) N Miyagi	2	3
Q	(Australia) K Sharpe	6	6
14	(Italy) R Reggi	4	2

Third round
7	(United States) MJ Fernandez	7^{7}	6
(West Germany) I Cueto	6^{3}	2
(United States) A Grossman	6	4	6
Q	(Australia) K Sharpe	2	6	1

Fourth round
7	(United States) MJ Fernandez	6	6
(United States) A Grossman	3	2

==== Section 6 ====
First round
12	(Austria) J Wiesner	6	6
(United States) G Magers	4	0
(Netherlands) M Bollegraf	6^{5}	2	r
(Australia) M Jaggard	7^{7}	3
WC	(France) S Testud	1	1
(United States) J Capriati	6	6
WC	(France) C Suire	7^{9}	6^{3}	3
(United States) C Macgregor	6^{7}	7^{7}	6
(France) A Dechaume	4	6^{5}
Q	(Switzerland) C Cohen	6	7^{7}
(United States) A Keller	6	0	4
(Italy) L Ferrando	3	6	6
(France) K Quentrec	4	6	3
(Argentina) M Paz	6	2	6
WC	(Netherlands) N van Lottum	1	3
3	(Spain) A Sánchez Vicario	6	6

Second round
12	(Austria) J Wiesner	6	6
(Australia) M Jaggard	3	1
(United States) J Capriati	6	6
(United States) C Macgregor	1	0
Q	(Switzerland) C Cohen	2	7	6
(Italy) L Ferrando	6	5	4
(Argentina) M Paz	7	3	6
3	(Spain) A Sánchez Vicario	5	6	1

Third round
12	(Austria) J Wiesner	4	4
(United States) J Capriati	6	6
Q	(Switzerland) C Cohen	1	5
(Argentina) M Paz	6	7

Fourth round
(United States) J Capriati	6	6
(Argentina) M Paz	0	3

==== Section 7 ====
First round
6	(Switzerland) M Maleeva-Fragnière	6	6
(United States) S Stafford	2	3
(Australia) A Minter	7	6
(Italy) F Romano	5	3
(Argentina) P Tarabini	6	6
(Australia) J-A Faull	0	4
(West Germany) C Kohde-Kilsch	6	6
(Japan) K Okamoto	1	1
(Netherlands) N Jagerman	4	2
(Italy) C Caverzasio	6	6
(Australia) L Field	2	2
(United States) S Martin	6	6
(Czechoslovakia) I Budařová	6	7^{7}
Q	(Canada) P Hy	2	6^{2}
(France) C Tanvier	4	6^{2}
10	(Soviet Union) N Zvereva	6	7^{7}

Second round
6	(Switzerland) M Maleeva-Fragnière	6	6
(Australia) A Minter	1	0
(Argentina) P Tarabini	3	6	6
(West Germany) C Kohde-Kilsch	6	1	4
(Italy) C Caverzasio	3	5
(United States) S Martin	6	7
(Czechoslovakia) I Budařová	1	3
10	(Soviet Union) N Zvereva	6	6

Third round
6	(Switzerland) M Maleeva-Fragnière	2	7	6
(Argentina) P Tarabini	6	5	0
(United States) S Martin	4	1
10	(Soviet Union) N Zvereva	6	6

Fourth round
6	(Switzerland) M Maleeva-Fragnière	6	6
10	(Soviet Union) N Zvereva	4	2

==== Section 8 ====
First round
16	(Peru) L Gildemeister	7^{7}	6
(United States) L McNeil	6^{5}	3
(United States) E Burgin	6	3	6
(United States) M Werdel	3	6	4
(United States) T Whitlinger	2	0
(Czechoslovakia) R Rajchrtová	6	6
(Argentina) F Labat	7^{7}	4	3
Q	(Bulgaria) M Maleeva	6^{3}	6	6
(Soviet Union) L Meskhi	6	6
(Australia) R McQuillan	4	1
(Soviet Union) L Savchenko	6^{10}	6	6
Q	(Brazil) L Corsato	7^{12}	4	4
(Sweden) C Lindqvist	3	0
(Canada) H Kelesi	6	6
(Italy) K Piccolini	0	0
2	(Socialist Federal Republic of Yugoslavia) M Seles	6	6

Second round
16	(Peru) L Gildemeister	6	6
(United States) E Burgin	3	4
(Czechoslovakia) R Rajchrtová	2	3
Q	(Bulgaria) M Maleeva	6	6
(Soviet Union) L Meskhi	3
(Soviet Union) L Savchenko	0	r
(Canada) H Kelesi	6	4	4
2	(Socialist Federal Republic of Yugoslavia) M Seles	4	6	6

Third round
16	(Peru) L Gildemeister	6	6
Q	(Bulgaria) M Maleeva	1	3
(Soviet Union) L Meskhi	6^{4}	6^{4}
2	(Socialist Federal Republic of Yugoslavia) M Seles	7^{7}	7^{7}

Fourth round
16	(Peru) L Gildemeister	4	0
2	(Socialist Federal Republic of Yugoslavia) M Seles	6	6

Preceded by 1990 Australian Open – Women's singles	Grand Slam women's singles	Succeeded by 1990 Wimbledon Championships – Women's singles
