= 1990 Australian Open – Women's singles =

Women's singles
- 1990 Australian Open

Final
- Champion: (Germany) Steffi Graf
- Runner-up: (United States) Mary Joe Fernández
- Score: 6–3, 6–4

Details
- Draw: 128
- Seeds: 16

Events
Singles	men	women		boys	girls
Doubles	men	women	mixed	boys	girls
WC Singles	men	women	quad
WC Doubles	men	women	quad
Legends	men	women	mixed
- Australian Open

Two-time defending champion Steffi Graf defeated Mary Joe Fernández in the final, 6–3, 6–4 to win the women's singles tennis title at the 1990 Australian Open. It was her third Australian Open title and ninth major title overall. This was Graf’s record twelfth consecutive major final, dating back to the 1987 French Open, surpassing Martina Navratilova's previous record of eleven consecutive major finals.

== Seeds ==
The seeded players are listed below. Steffi Graf is the champion; others show the round in which they were eliminated.

1. (Germany) Steffi Graf (champion)
2. (Argentina) Gabriela Sabatini (third round)
3. (United States) Zina Garrison (quarterfinals)
4. (Czechoslovakia) Helena Suková (semifinals)
5. (Czechoslovakia) Jana Novotná (third round)
6. (United States) Mary Joe Fernández (finalist)
7. (Australia) Hana Mandlíková (third round)
8. (Canada) Helen Kelesi (third round)
9. (Bulgaria) Katerina Maleeva (quarterfinals)
10. (Soviet Union) Natalia Zvereva (second round)
11. (United States) Pam Shriver (third round)
12. (Soviet Union) Larisa Savchenko-Neiland (first round)
13. (Italy) Raffaella Reggi (fourth round)
14. (South Africa) Rosalyn Fairbank (third round)
15. (United States) Gigi Fernández (fourth round)
16. (Austria) Barbara Paulus (fourth round)

== Draw ==
=== Key ===
- Q = Qualifier
- WC = Wild card
- LL = Lucky loser
- r = Retired

=== Finals ===
Quarterfinals
1	(Germany) Steffi Graf	6	7
(United States) Patty Fendick	3	5
4	(Czechoslovakia) Helena Suková	6	6
9	(Bulgaria) Katerina Maleeva	4	3
6	(United States) Mary Joe Fernández	1	6	8
3	(United States) Zina Garrison	6	2	6
Q	(Mexico) Angélica Gavaldón	4	3
(Germany) Claudia Porwik	6	6

Semifinals
1	(Germany) Steffi Graf	6	3	6
4	(Czechoslovakia) Helena Suková	3	6	4
6	(United States) Mary Joe Fernández	6	6
(Germany) Claudia Porwik	2	1

Finals
1	(Germany) Steffi Graf	6	6
6	(United States) Mary Joe Fernández	3	4

=== Earlier rounds ===
==== Section 1 ====
First round
1	(Germany) S Graf	6	7
(United States) C Cunningham	2	5
Q	(United States) E deLone	6	7
WC	(Australia) L Stacey	4	5
(Soviet Union) L Meskhi	6	6
(Italy) L Golarsa	4	4
(Sweden) C Dahlman	7^{7}	6
(United States) K Kessaris	6^{5}	1
(Germany) A Huber	6	6
(France) M Laval	1	1
(United States) E Burgin	2	7^{9}	6
(United States) S Stafford	6	6^{7}	3
(United Kingdom) J Durie	7	7^{7}
(France) P Paradis	5	6^{4}
WC	(Australia) J Hodder	1	0
13	(Italy) R Reggi	6	6

Second round
1	(Germany) S Graf	6	6
Q	(United States) E deLone	1	2
(Soviet Union) L Meskhi	2	6	6
(Sweden) C Dahlman	6	1	3
(Germany) A Huber	6	6
(United States) E Burgin	2	0
(United Kingdom) J Durie	4	4
13	(Italy) R Reggi	6	6

Third round
1	(Germany) S Graf	6	6
(Soviet Union) L Meskhi	4	1
(Germany) A Huber	5	6	4
13	(Italy) R Reggi	7	4	6

Fourth round
1	(Germany) S Graf	6	6
13	(Italy) R Reggi	2	3

==== Section 2 ====
First round
16	(Austria) B Paulus	6	6
(Czechoslovakia) R Rajchrtová	3	1
(Japan) N Miyagi	7	6
(Czechoslovakia) R Zrubáková	5	4
(Australia) E Smylie	6	7
(Canada) J Hetherington	3	5
(Austria) B Reinstadler	6	6
(United States) R Reis	1	2
(United States) P Fendick	6	6
(Japan) A Nishiya	1	3
(United States) A Keller	3	7^{7}	6
Q	(Germany) S Menning	6	6^{4}	4
(Hungary) A Temesvári	0	6	6
WC	(Australia) R Stubbs	6	3	2
(United States) S Martin	7^{7}	0	0
5	(Czechoslovakia) J Novotná	6^{5}	6	6

Second round
16	(Austria) B Paulus	7^{7}	4	6
(Japan) N Miyagi	6^{1}	6	0
(Australia) E Smylie	6	6
(Austria) B Reinstadler	2	4
(United States) P Fendick	7	6
(United States) A Keller	5	2
(Hungary) A Temesvári	1	1
5	(Czechoslovakia) J Novotná	6	6

Third round
16	(Austria) B Paulus	6	6
(Australia) E Smylie	4	3
(United States) P Fendick	1	7^{7}	6
5	(Czechoslovakia) J Novotná	6	6^{5}	4

Fourth round
16	(Austria) B Paulus	5	2
(United States) P Fendick	7	6

==== Section 3 ====
First round
4	(Czechoslovakia) H Suková	6	6
WC	(Australia) T Morton	4	3
(Soviet Union) N Medvedeva	6	7
Q	(South Africa) L Gregory	4	5
Q	(United Kingdom) S Loosemore	6	7
(Australia) J-A Faull	3	5
(Bulgaria) E Pampoulova	4	6	6
WC	(Australia) K Godridge	6	4	2
(Japan) K Date	6	7^{7}
(France) P Etchemendy	3	6^{5}
(Netherlands) B Schultz	6	6
(Germany) M Pawlik	4	3
(Australia) N Provis	7	7^{7}
Q	(Germany) E-M Schürhoff	5	6^{5}
(Czechoslovakia) E Švíglerová	3	4
11	(United States) P Shriver	6	6

Second round
4	(Czechoslovakia) H Suková	6	6
(Soviet Union) N Medvedeva	2	0
Q	(United Kingdom) S Loosemore	6	6
(Bulgaria) E Pampoulova	3	3
(Japan) K Date	7	7^{9}
(Netherlands) B Schultz	5	6^{7}
(Australia) N Provis	6	2	7
11	(United States) P Shriver	1	6	9

Third round
4	(Czechoslovakia) H Suková	6	4	6
Q	(United Kingdom) S Loosemore	3	6	3
(Japan) K Date	6	6
11	(United States) P Shriver	4	3

Fourth round
4	(Czechoslovakia) H Suková	6	6
(Japan) K Date	4	3

==== Section 4 ====
First round
9	(Bulgaria) K Maleeva	6	6
(United States) L McNeil	2	1
WC	(Australia) K McDonald	6	6
(United States) L Allen	4	4
(Japan) K Okamoto	6	2	6
(Canada) M Drake	4	6	1
(Netherlands) N Jagerman	6	7^{7}
(Germany) C Kohde-Kilsch	4	6^{3}
WC	(Australia) K Sharpe	7	3	6
(Australia) L Field	5	6	3
(Australia) R McQuillan	6	6
(Italy) F Bonsignori	1	2
(Germany) S Meier	6	6
Q	(United States) J Smoller	4	2
(Germany) W Probst	2	3
8	(Canada) H Kelesi	6	6

Second round
9	(Bulgaria) K Maleeva	6	6
WC	(Australia) K McDonald	3	2
(Japan) K Okamoto	1	2
(Netherlands) N Jagerman	6	6
WC	(Australia) K Sharpe	3	0
(Australia) R McQuillan	6	6
(Germany) S Meier	2	4
8	(Canada) H Kelesi	6	6

Third round
9	(Bulgaria) K Maleeva	6	6
(Netherlands) N Jagerman	0	4
(Australia) R McQuillan	6	7^{7}
8	(Canada) H Kelesi	2	6^{4}

Fourth round
9	(Bulgaria) K Maleeva	3	6	6
(Australia) R McQuillan	6	4	1

==== Section 5 ====
First round
6	(United States) M J Fernández	6	6
(Australia) M Jaggard	1	3
(United States) K Rinaldi	6	3	6
(United States) R White	4	6	4
(United States) A Henricksson	4	6	6
(United States) M Werdel	6	4	4
(France) J Halard	7	6
(Belgium) A Devries	5	2
(United States) D Faber	6	6
(Germany) E Pfaff	3	0
(United States) A Leand	6	4	6
(Australia) D Balestrat	2	6	4
(Netherlands) C Bakkum	6	6
(Australia) K Radford	3	2
(United States) C Benjamin	3	3
14	(South Africa) R Fairbank	6	6

Second round
6	(United States) M J Fernández	6	6
(United States) K Rinaldi	4	4
(United States) A Henricksson	6^{4}	2
(France) J Halard	7^{7}	6
(United States) D Faber	6	6
(United States) A Leand	1	3
(Netherlands) C Bakkum	6^{3}	4
14	(South Africa) R Fairbank	7^{7}	6

Third round
6	(United States) M J Fernández	6	3	6
(France) J Halard	0	6	0
(United States) D Faber	6	6
14	(South Africa) R Fairbank	3	4

Fourth round
6	(United States) M J Fernández	6	6
(United States) D Faber	4	2

==== Section 6 ====
First round
12	(Soviet Union) L Savchenko-Neiland	6	1	10
(France) C Tanvier	4	6	12
(Japan) E Inoue	6	7^{7}
(United States) B Bowes	3	6^{5}
WC	(Australia) N Pratt	6	6^{6}	10
(United States) H Ludloff	1	7^{8}	8
(Belgium) S Appelmans	6	6
(United Kingdom) S Gomer	1	0
(France) I Demongeot	4	6	6
(United States) K Adams	6	2	2
(Japan) M Kidowaki	7	6
(Switzerland) E Krapl	5	2
(Finland) P Thorén	3	6	6
(Denmark) T Scheuer-Larsen	6	3	1
(Japan) A Kijimuta	1	2
3	(United States) Z Garrison	6	6

Second round
(France) C Tanvier	6	6
(Japan) E Inoue	4	4
WC	(Australia) N Pratt	2	3
(Belgium) S Appelmans	6	6
(France) I Demongeot	6	6
(Japan) M Kidowaki	4	1
(Finland) P Thorén	2	0
3	(United States) Z Garrison	6	6

Third round
(France) C Tanvier	7^{9}	6
(Belgium) S Appelmans	6^{7}	0
(France) I Demongeot	7	3	4
3	(United States) Z Garrison	5	6	6

Fourth round
(France) C Tanvier	2	0	r
3	(United States) Z Garrison	6	2

==== Section 7 ====
First round
7	(Australia) H Mandlíková	4	6	6
(Australia) A Minter	6	2	3
(United States) C Macgregor	6	6
Q	(United Kingdom) C Wood	4	2
Q	(Mexico) A Gavaldón	6	6
(United States) L Poruri	3	3
LL	(France) A Dechaume	6	7
(Luxembourg) K Kschwendt	4	5
(United States) T Whitlinger	6	6
(France) C Suire	1	2
(United States) T Phelps	6	6
(Australia) J Tremelling	4	3
(Czechoslovakia) J Pospíšilová	6	6
(Switzerland) E Zardo	4	1
(France) K Quentrec	3	4
15	(United States) G Fernández	6	6

Second round
7	(Australia) H Mandlíková	7^{8}	6
(United States) C Macgregor	6^{6}	3
Q	(Mexico) A Gavaldón	6	4	7
LL	(France) A Dechaume	4	6	5
(United States) T Whitlinger	7	6
(United States) T Phelps	5	3
(Czechoslovakia) J Pospíšilová	4	6^{4}
15	(United States) G Fernández	6	7^{7}

Third round
7	(Australia) H Mandlíková	1	6	1
Q	(Mexico) A Gavaldón	6	1	6
(United States) T Whitlinger	6^{6}	3
15	(United States) G Fernández	7^{8}	6

Fourth round
Q	(Mexico) A Gavaldón	6	1	6
15	(United States) G Fernández	3	6	2

==== Section 8 ====
First round
10	(Soviet Union) N Zvereva	6^{3}	7	7
(France) N Herreman	7^{7}	5	5
(Belgium) S Wasserman	7^{7}	0	6
(Czechoslovakia) P Langrová	6^{5}	6	3
(South Africa) D Van Rensburg	6	6
(Austria) P Ritter	0	0
(United States) H Cioffi	7	6
(Hungary) C Bartos	5	4
(Austria) J Wiesner	7	6
(Socialist Federal Republic of Yugoslavia) S Goleš	5	2
(Germany) C Porwik	6	6
(Switzerland) C Cohen	4	1
(Netherlands) M Bollegraf	6	6
(United States) A Grossman	2	3
(United States) A Frazier	5	1
2	(Argentina) G Sabatini	7	6

Second round
10	(Soviet Union) N Zvereva	5	1
(Belgium) S Wasserman	7	6
(South Africa) D Van Rensburg	6	6
(United States) H Cioffi	0	4
(Austria) J Wiesner	3	6^{4}
(Germany) C Porwik	6	7^{7}
(Netherlands) M Bollegraf	1	1
2	(Argentina) G Sabatini	6	6

Third round
(Belgium) S Wasserman	4	2
(South Africa) D Van Rensburg	6	6
(Germany) C Porwik	2	0
2	(Argentina) G Sabatini	6	1^{r}

Fourth round
(South Africa) D Van Rensburg	6^{4}	6	4
(Germany) C Porwik	7^{7}	3	6

Preceded by 1989 US Open – Women's singles	Grand Slam women's singles	Succeeded by 1990 French Open – Women's singles
