= 1992 Australian Open – Women's singles =

Women's singles
- 1992 Australian Open

Final
- Champion: (Socialist Federal Republic of Yugoslavia) Monica Seles
- Runner-up: (United States) Mary Joe Fernández
- Score: 6–2, 6–3

Details
- Draw: 128
- Seeds: 16

Events
Singles	men	women		boys	girls
Doubles	men	women	mixed	boys	girls
WC Singles	men	women	quad
WC Doubles	men	women	quad
Legends	men	women	mixed
- Australian Open

Defending champion Monica Seles defeated Mary Joe Fernández in the final, 6–2, 6–3 to win the women's singles tennis title at the 1992 Australian Open. It was her second Australian Open title and fifth major title overall.

== Seeds ==
The seeded players are listed below. Monica Seles is the champion; others show the round in which they were eliminated.

1. (Socialist Federal Republic of Yugoslavia) Monica Seles (champion)
2. (Germany) Steffi Graf (withdrew due to rubella)
3. (Argentina) Gabriela Sabatini (semifinals)
4. (Spain) Arantxa Sánchez Vicario (semifinals)
5. (United States) Jennifer Capriati (quarterfinals)
6. (Czechoslovakia) Jana Novotná (fourth round)
7. (United States) Mary Joe Fernández (finalist)
8. (Spain) Conchita Martínez (fourth round)
9. (Switzerland) Manuela Maleeva (quarterfinals)
10. (Bulgaria) Katerina Maleeva (fourth round)
11. (United States) Zina Garrison (fourth round)
12. (Germany) Anke Huber (quarterfinals)
13. (Commonwealth of Independent States) Leila Meskhi (fourth round)
14. (Austria) Judith Wiesner (second round)
15. (Czechoslovakia) Helena Suková (third round)
16. (Belgium) Sabine Appelmans (first round)

== Draw ==
=== Key ===
- Q = Qualifier
- WC = Wild card
- LL = Lucky loser
- r = Retired

=== Finals ===
Quarterfinals
1	(Socialist Federal Republic of Yugoslavia) Monica Seles	7	6
12	(Germany) Anke Huber	5	3
4	(Spain) Arantxa Sánchez Vicario
9	(Switzerland) Manuela Maleeva	w/o
5	(United States) Jennifer Capriati	4	6^{1}
3	(Argentina) Gabriela Sabatini	6	7^{7}
7	(United States) Mary Joe Fernández	6	7^{8}
(United States) Amy Frazier	4	6^{6}

Semifinals
1	(Socialist Federal Republic of Yugoslavia) Monica Seles	6	6
4	(Spain) Arantxa Sánchez Vicario	2	2
3	(Argentina) Gabriela Sabatini	1	4
7	(United States) Mary Joe Fernández	6	6

Finals
1	(Socialist Federal Republic of Yugoslavia) Monica Seles	6	6
7	(United States) Mary Joe Fernández	2	3

=== Earlier rounds ===
==== Section 1 ====
First round
1	(Socialist Federal Republic of Yugoslavia) M Seles	6	6
(Japan) A Kijimuta	2	0
(Japan) K Date	6	6
(Argentina) M Paz	2	4
WC	(Australia) L Field	6	6
(United Kingdom) S Gomer	3	2
(Indonesia) N Basuki	6	7
(Argentina) P Tarabini	3	5
(Japan) M Kidowaki	6	6
(Australia) A Minter	2	4
(Germany) M Kochta	6	6
(United States) H Ludloff	3	4
Q	(United States) N Arendt	6	6
Q	(United States) P O'Reilly	3	4
Q	(Mexico) A Gavaldón	2	2
13	(Commonwealth of Independent States) L Meskhi	6	6

Second round
1	(Socialist Federal Republic of Yugoslavia) M Seles	6	7
(Japan) K Date	2	5
WC	(Australia) L Field	7^{7}	3	4
(Indonesia) N Basuki	6^{5}	6	6
(Japan) M Kidowaki	3	1
(Germany) M Kochta	6	6
Q	(United States) N Arendt	1	2
13	(Commonwealth of Independent States) L Meskhi	6	6

Third round
1	(Socialist Federal Republic of Yugoslavia) M Seles	6	6
(Indonesia) N Basuki	1	1
(Germany) M Kochta	1	6^{4}
13	(Commonwealth of Independent States) L Meskhi	6	7^{7}

Fourth round
1	(Socialist Federal Republic of Yugoslavia) M Seles	6	4	6
13	(Commonwealth of Independent States) L Meskhi	4	6	2

==== Section 2 ====
First round
12	(Germany) A Huber	2	6	6
(Germany) M Zivec-Skulj	6	3	1
WC	(Australia) M Jaggard	2	6	9
(Netherlands) M Bollegraf	6	4	7
(South Africa) R Fairbank-Nideffer	6	6
(United States) C Rubin	4	1
Q	(United States) J Emmons	6	6
(Czechoslovakia) D Szabová	4	2
WC	(Australia) R Stubbs	6	6
(Czechoslovakia) R Bobková	0	1
Q	(China) F Li	6	6
(Japan) R Hiraki	2	4
(Canada) R Alter	6	6
(Austria) B Paulus	4	0
(Czechoslovakia) R Zrubáková	6^{6}	3
6	(Czechoslovakia) J Novotná	7^{8}	6

Second round
12	(Germany) A Huber	6	6
WC	(Australia) M Jaggard	0	1
(South Africa) R Fairbank-Nideffer	6	6
Q	(United States) J Emmons	4	2
WC	(Australia) R Stubbs	5	2
Q	(China) F Li	7	6
(Canada) R Alter	3	2
6	(Czechoslovakia) J Novotná	6	6

Third round
12	(Germany) A Huber	6	7
(South Africa) R Fairbank-Nideffer	0	5
Q	(China) F Li	3	1
6	(Czechoslovakia) J Novotná	6	6

Fourth round
12	(Germany) A Huber	5	7^{7}	6
6	(Czechoslovakia) J Novotná	7	6^{5}	4

==== Section 3 ====
First round
4	(Spain) A Sánchez Vicario	6	6
(Australia) N Provis	2	1
(France) S Testud	6	3	6
(United States) L McNeil	2	6	4
(Peru) L Gildemeister	6	6^{1}	6
(United States) M Werdel	4	7^{7}	1
(Czechoslovakia) A Strnadová	6	6
(France) I Demongeot	3	4
(United States) K Po	6	2	6
(United Kingdom) S Smith	4	6	1
WC	(Australia) J Limmer	6	6
(Switzerland) E Zardo	3	2
(United Kingdom) J Durie	7	6
(Argentina) F Labat	5	1
(Latvia) L Neiland	7	6
16	(Belgium) S Appelmans	5	2

Second round
4	(Spain) A Sánchez Vicario	6	6
(France) S Testud	1	1
(Peru) L Gildemeister	6	4	7
(Czechoslovakia) A Strnadová	4	6	9
(United States) K Po	3	6	7
WC	(Australia) J Limmer	6	4	5
(United Kingdom) J Durie	4	6	1
(Latvia) L Neiland	6	4	6

Third round
4	(Spain) A Sánchez Vicario	1	6	6
(Czechoslovakia) A Strnadová	6	0	3
(United States) K Po	2	6	1
(Latvia) L Neiland	6	2	6

Fourth round
4	(Spain) A Sánchez Vicario	6	7^{8}
(Latvia) L Neiland	1	6^{6}

==== Section 4 ====
First round
9	(Switzerland) M Maleeva	4	6	6
(United States) G Helgeson	6	3	1
(Czechoslovakia) K Habšudová	6	6
(United States) G Fernández	4	4
(Sweden) C Lindqvist	7^{7}	6
(United States) M-L Daniels	6^{2}	3
(United States) T Whitlinger	6	5	6
LL	(Australia) J-A Faull	1	7	4
Q	(Finland) N Dahlman	2	6	7
(United States) D Faber	6	3	5
(United States) R White	6	6
(France) N Herreman	0	1
(United States) S Rehe	6	6
(Czechoslovakia) E Švíglerová	2	4
(United States) S Stafford	3	1
8	(Spain) C Martínez	6	6

Second round
9	(Switzerland) M Maleeva	6	6
(Czechoslovakia) K Habšudová	3	3
(Sweden) C Lindqvist	3	6^{3}
(United States) T Whitlinger	6	7^{7}
Q	(Finland) N Dahlman	2	4
(United States) R White	6	6
(United States) S Rehe	1	2
8	(Spain) C Martínez	6	6

Third round
9	(Switzerland) M Maleeva	6	6
(United States) T Whitlinger	2	1
(United States) R White	5	0
8	(Spain) C Martínez	7	6

Fourth round
9	(Switzerland) M Maleeva	6	2	6
8	(Spain) C Martínez	4	6	2

==== Section 5 ====
First round
5	(United States) J Capriati	6	6
(Commonwealth of Independent States) N Medvedeva	2	0
(France) N van Lottum	6	6
Q	(Japan) Y Kamio	4	2
(Argentina) I Gorrochategui	4	6	6
(Austria) M Maruska	6	4	3
(United States) K Adams	4
(Germany) I Cueto	1	r
(United States) P Shriver	6	6
WC	(Australia) L Stacey	0	1
(Commonwealth of Independent States) N Zvereva	6	6
(Finland) P Thorén	4	4
(Germany) C Kohde-Kilsch	6	1	7
(Germany) C Porwik	1	6	5
(Germany) S Frankl	2	2
11	(United States) Z Garrison	6	6

Second round
5	(United States) J Capriati	6	6
(France) N van Lottum	3	4
(Argentina) I Gorrochategui	1	5
(United States) K Adams	6	7
(United States) P Shriver	6	7^{7}
(Commonwealth of Independent States) N Zvereva	4	6^{3}
(Germany) C Kohde-Kilsch	2	3
11	(United States) Z Garrison	6	6

Third round
5	(United States) J Capriati	6	6
(United States) K Adams	0	0
(United States) P Shriver	4	2
11	(United States) Z Garrison	6	6

Fourth round
5	(United States) J Capriati	6	6
11	(United States) Z Garrison	4	4

==== Section 6 ====
First round
10	(Bulgaria) K Maleeva	6	1	6
(United States) D Graham	4	6	4
Q	(France) N Housset	4	6	6
(Netherlands) P Kamstra	6	4	4
WC	(Australia) K Sharpe	6	7
(Germany) S Meier	2	5
(Hungary) A-M Földényi	6	6
(Germany) M Babel	2	4
(Austria) P Ritter	6	4	7
LL	(Canada) M Drake	3	6	5
WC	(Australia) J Byrne	6	6
(Socialist Federal Republic of Yugoslavia) B Mulej	1	0
(Canada) P Hy	6	6
(Bulgaria) M Maleeva	4	3
(France) J Halard	2	0
3	(Argentina) G Sabatini	6	6

Second round
10	(Bulgaria) K Maleeva	6	6
Q	(France) N Housset	2	1
WC	(Australia) K Sharpe	6	6
(Hungary) A-M Földényi	2	3
(Austria) P Ritter	4	2
WC	(Australia) J Byrne	6	6
(Canada) P Hy	1	1
3	(Argentina) G Sabatini	6	6

Third round
10	(Bulgaria) K Maleeva	6	6
WC	(Australia) K Sharpe	0	4
WC	(Australia) J Byrne	1	0
3	(Argentina) G Sabatini	6	6

Fourth round
10	(Bulgaria) K Maleeva	1	5
3	(Argentina) G Sabatini	6	7

==== Section 7 ====
First round
7	(United States) M J Fernández	6	6
(United Kingdom) M Javer	1	0
(Germany) B Rittner	6	3	6
(Netherlands) B Schultz	1	6	4
(United States) L Harvey-Wild	6	6
(Canada) H Kelesi	1	4
(Australia) R McQuillan	6	6
(United States) S Sloane-Lundy	4	4
(United States) P Fendick	6	6
(France) S Niox-Château	1	3
(United States) H Cioffi	6	6
(United Kingdom) C Wood	4	2
(France) A Dechaume	6	6
(Argentina) B Fulco-Villella	4	1
(Argentina) C Tessi	4	3
14	(Austria) J Wiesner	6	6

Second round
7	(United States) M J Fernández	6	6
(Germany) B Rittner	4	4
(United States) L Harvey-Wild	2	6	0
(Australia) R McQuillan	6	4	6
(United States) P Fendick	5	6	6
(United States) H Cioffi	7	2	3
(France) A Dechaume	6	7^{7}
14	(Austria) J Wiesner	2	6^{5}

Third round
7	(United States) M J Fernández	6	2	6
(Australia) R McQuillan	1	6	1
(United States) P Fendick	5	7	6
(France) A Dechaume	7	5	4

Fourth round
7	(United States) M J Fernández	6	6
(United States) P Fendick	4	1

==== Section 8 ====
First round
15	(Czechoslovakia) H Suková	6	6
(Germany) V Martinek	3	2
(Netherlands) N Krijger-Jagerman	6	7^{7}
(Australia) K Godridge	4	6^{3}
(Belgium) D Monami	4	7	6
(Commonwealth of Independent States) E Maniokova	6	5	1
WC	(Australia) N Pratt	6	6
(Japan) N Miyagi	3	3
(Czechoslovakia) R Rajchrtová	7^{10}	2	7
(Japan) M Endo	6^{8}	6	5
(Germany) S Hack	6	7
(France) C Tanvier	4	5
(United States) A Frazier	6	7
(United States) C Cunningham	3	5
(Germany) K Oeljeklaus	1	5
LL	(Belgium) A Devries	6	7

Second round
15	(Czechoslovakia) H Suková	7	6
(Netherlands) N Krijger-Jagerman	5	3
(Belgium) D Monami	6	7^{7}
WC	(Australia) N Pratt	4	6^{5}
(Czechoslovakia) R Rajchrtová	5	6	2
(Germany) S Hack	7	3	6
(United States) A Frazier	6	7^{7}
LL	(Belgium) A Devries	1	6^{4}

Third round
15	(Czechoslovakia) H Suková	6	4	4
(Belgium) D Monami	2	6	6
(Germany) S Hack	1	6	2
(United States) A Frazier	6	3	6

Fourth round
(Belgium) D Monami	3	4
(United States) A Frazier	6	6
