= Sandy Sureephong =

American tennis player

- Full name: Varalee Sureephong Blanton
- Country (sports): United States
- Born: May 2, 1976 (age 50) Charleston, West Virginia, U.S.
- Prize money: $22,020

Singles
- Highest ranking: No. 368 (August 7, 1995)

Doubles
- Career titles: 6 ITF
- Highest ranking: No. 158 (October 17, 1994)

Grand Slam doubles results
- Wimbledon: Q1 (1994)

Varalee "Sandy" Sureephong (born May 2, 1976) is an American former professional tennis player.

== Biography ==
Born in Charleston, West Virginia, Sureephong is of Thai descent and was raised in Baltimore, then later Haines City, Florida. She has been known by "Sandy" since childhood, a nickname which her parents gave her.

Sureephong was a four-time All-American tennis player at the University of Texas, which she attended from 1995 to 1999. She was twice named the Big 12 Conference Player of the Year.

On the professional tour she reached a best singles ranking of 368 and was ranked as high as 158 in the world for doubles. She competed in four WTA Tour main draws in doubles and was most successful in partnership with Canada's Vanessa Webb, with whom she won four of her six ITF doubles titles. The pair featured in the qualifying draw for the 1994 Wimbledon Championships.

Her husband is former Chicago Bulls basketball player Ricky Blanton.

== ITF finals ==
$50,000 tournaments
$25,000 tournaments
$10,000 tournaments

=== Singles: 1 (0–1) ===
Result	No.	Date	Tournament	Surface	Opponent	Score
Loss	1.	July 3, 1995	Norfolk, United States	Hard	(Australia) Jane Taylor	5–7, 1–6

=== Doubles: 14 (6–8) ===
Result	No.	Date	Tournament	Surface	Partner	Opponents	Score
Loss	1.	July 16, 1990	Greensboro, United States	Clay	(Poland) Julie Kaczmarek	(United States) Jessica Emmons (United States) Meredith Geiger	2–6, 1–6
Loss	2.	October 19, 1992	Kyoto, Japan	Hard	(Japan) Masako Yanagi	(Japan) Yuko Hosoki (Japan) Naoko Kijimuta	3–6, 3–6
Loss	3.	November 16, 1992	Bangkok, Thailand	Hard	(Japan) Seiko Ichioka	(Thailand) Suvimol Duangchan (Thailand) Benjamas Sangaram	4–6, 7–6^{(1)}, 3–6
Loss	4.	February 1, 1993	Bandar Seri Begawan, Brunei	Hard	(Thailand) Tamarine Tanasugarn	(Indonesia) Suzanna Wibowo (Indonesia) Romana Tedjakusuma	3–6, 1–6
Win	1.	August 2, 1993	Norfolk, United States	Hard	(Canada) Vanessa Webb	(Australia) Maija Avotins (Australia) Lisa McShea	7–6, 6–4
Win	2.	October 18, 1993	Sedona, United States	Hard	(Canada) Vanessa Webb	(United States) Jessica Emmons (United States) Caroline Kuhlman	6–4, 7–6^{(5)}
Win	3.	August 1, 1994	Norfolk, United States	Hard	(United States) Karin Miller	(Australia) Gail Biggs (New Zealand) Claudine Toleafoa	6–3, 4–6, 6–2
Loss	5.	October 10, 1994	Sedona, United States	Hard	(Canada) Vanessa Webb	(United States) Shannan McCarthy (United States) Julie Steven	3–6, 3–6
Loss	6.	February 5, 1995	Midland, United States	Hard	(United States) Laxmi Poruri	(Netherlands) Brenda Schultz-McCarthy (United States) Chanda Rubin	3–6, 2–6
Win	4.	July 10, 1995	Easton, United States	Hard	(United States) Karin Miller	(Australia) Gail Biggs (Australia) Nicole Oomens	6–2, 7–6^{(4)}
Loss	7.	July 24, 1995	Salisbury, Maryland, United States	Hard	(Canada) Vanessa Webb	(United States) Shannan McCarthy (United States) Julie Steven	3–6, 2–6
Win	5.	June 9, 1997	Hilton Head, United States	Hard	(Canada) Vanessa Webb	(New Zealand) Nicola Kaiwai (New Zealand) Gaye McManus	6–1, 6–3
Win	6.	June 14, 1998	Hilton Head, United States	Hard	(Canada) Vanessa Webb	(United States) Holly Parkinson (United States) Tracy Almeda-Singian	6–2, 7–6^{(4)}
Loss	8.	May 28, 2000	El Paso, United States	Hard	(United States) Kaysie Smashey	(India) Manisha Malhotra (New Zealand) Leanne Baker	2–6, 6–7
