= Jane Taylor (tennis) =

Australian tennis player

- Country (sports): Australia
- Born: Hunter Valley, Australia
- Height: 168 cm (5 ft 6 in)
- Prize money: $131,761

Singles
- Highest ranking: No. 126 (7 February 1994)

Grand Slam singles results
- Australian Open: 3R (1994)

Doubles
- Highest ranking: No. 163 (4 December 1995)

Grand Slam doubles results
- Australian Open: 2R (1991, 1995)

Jane Taylor is a former professional tennis player from Australia.

== Biography ==
Taylor comes from Maitland, in the Hunter Valley region of New South Wales. She made her grand slam debut as a 16-year old at the 1989 Australian Open and featured regularly in that event in the 1990s. Her best performance was a third round appearance at the 1994 Australian Open. Competing as a wildcard, she had wins over Caroline Vis and Christina Singer, before being eliminated in the third round by fifth seed Jana Novotna. She had a career best ranking of 126 in the world.

== ITF finals ==
=== Singles (9–11) ===
$25,000 tournaments
$10,000 tournaments

Outcome	No.	Date	Tournament	Surface	Opponent	Score
Runner-up	1.	11 March 1990	Bendigo, Australia	Hard	(Australia) Kirrily Sharpe	0–6, 6–7
Winner	1.	2 March 1992	Mildura, Australia	Grass	(New Zealand) Julie Richardson	7–6, 6–3
Winner	2.	23 March 1992	Newcastle, Australia	Grass	(New Zealand) Julie Richardson	6–3, 3–6, 6–3
Winner	3.	9 August 1992	College Park, United States	Hard	(France) Carole Lucarelli	7–5, 6–3
Runner-up	2.	7 March 1993	Mildura, Australia	Grass	(Australia) Kirrily Sharpe	0–6, 6–4, 3–6
Runner-up	3.	14 March 1993	Wodonga, Australia	Grass	(Australia) Lisa O'Neill	2–6, 4–6
Runner-up	4.	21 March 1993	Canberra, Australia	Grass	(Australia) Catherine Barclay	4–6, 6–4, 2–6
Winner	4.	28 March 1993	Bendigo, Australia	Grass	(Australia) Catherine Barclay	4–6, 6–0, 7–6
Runner-up	5.	21 November 1993	Port Pirie, Australia	Hard	(Australia) Michelle Jaggard-Lai	2–6, 1–6
Runner-up	6.	13 March 1994	Warrnambool, Australia	Hard	(Australia) Angie Cunningham	w/o
Runner-up	7.	5 March 1995	Warrnambool, Australia	Hard	(Australia) Melissa Beadman	6–7, 4–6
Winner	5.	12 March 1995	Wodonga, Australia	Hard	(Australia) Angie Marik	6–4, 2–6, 7–6
Winner	6.	26 March 1995	Bendigo, Australia	Hard	(Australia) Angie Cunningham	6–0, 6–4
Winner	7.	3 July 1995	Norfolk, United States	Hard	(United States) Sandy Sureephong	7–5, 6–1
Runner-up	8.	16 July 1995	Easton, United States	Hard	(United States) Sara Pritchard	3–6, 4–6
Runner-up	9.	4 March 1996	Warrnambool, Australia	Grass	(Thailand) Tamarine Tanasugarn	4–6, 1–6
Winner	8.	2 June 1996	El Paso, United States	Hard	(Republic of Ireland) Anne Mall	4–6, 6–1, 6–2
Runner-up	10.	10 November 1996	Bendigo, Australia	Hard	(Australia) Annabel Ellwood	3–6, 4–6
Winner	9.	10 March 1997	Canberra, Australia	Grass	(Australia) Evie Dominikovic	7–5, 4–6, 6–4
Runner-up	11.	24 March 1997	Corowa, Australia	Grass	(Australia) Evie Dominikovic	4–6, 2–6

=== Doubles (9–6) ===
Outcome	No.	Date	Tournament	Surface	Partner	Opponents	Score
Runner-up	1.	19 November 1989	Gold Coast, Australia	Hard	(Australia) Louise Stacey	(Australia) Kristine Kunce (Australia) Kate McDonald	4–6, 2–6
Runner-up	2.	23 March 1992	Newcastle, Australia	Clay	(South Africa) Michelle Anderson	(New Zealand) Julie Richardson (New Zealand) Amanda Trail	4–6, 2–6
Winner	1.	9 August 1992	College Park, United States	Hard	(United Kingdom) Sarah Loosemore	(United Kingdom) Michele Mair (South Africa) Karen van der Merwe	6–4, 6–3
Runner-up	3.	7 March 1993	Mildura, Australia	Grass	(Australia) Kate McDonald	(Australia) Catherine Barclay (Australia) Kirrily Sharpe	1–6, 2–6
Winner	2.	14 March 1993	Wodonga, Australia	Grass	(Australia) Kate McDonald	(Australia) Robyn Mawdsley (Australia) Danielle Thomas	2–6, 6–3, 6–3
Winner	3.	21 March 1993	Canberra, Australia	Grass	(Australia) Kate McDonald	(Australia) Maija Avotins (Australia) Robyn Mawdsley	w/o
Winner	4.	28 March 1993	Bendigo, Australia	Grass	(Australia) Kate McDonald	(Australia) Maija Avotins (Australia) Esther Knox	6–3, 6–1
Runner-up	4.	13 March 1994	Warrnambool, Australia	Hard	(Australia) Kate McDonald	(Australia) Nicole Oomens (Australia) Shannon Peters	w/o
Runner-up	5.	5 March 1995	Warrnambool, Australia	Hard	(Australia) Trudi Musgrave	(Australia) Gail Biggs (Australia) Nicole Oomens	1–6, 5–7
Winner	5.	12 March 1995	Wodonga, Australia	Hard	(Australia) Trudi Musgrave	(Australia) Gail Biggs (Australia) Nicole Oomens	6–3, 6–2
Winner	6.	19 March 1995	Canberra, Australia	Hard	(Australia) Trudi Musgrave	(Australia) Gail Biggs (Australia) Nicole Oomens	6–3, 6–2
Runner-up	6.	26 March 1995	Bendigo, Australia	Hard	(Australia) Trudi Musgrave	(Australia) Gail Biggs (Australia) Nicole Oomens	6–7, 5–7
Winner	7.	11 March 1996	Canberra, Australia	Grass	(Australia) Trudi Musgrave	(Australia) Joanne Limmer (Australia) Lisa McShea	6–4, 5–7, 6–4
Winner	8.	25 March 1996	Albury, Australia	Grass	(Australia) Trudi Musgrave	(Australia) Joanne Limmer (Australia) Lisa McShea	6–0, 6–3
Winner	9.	4 April 1997	Corowa, Australia	Grass	(Australia) Trudi Musgrave	(South Africa) Nannie de Villiers (United Kingdom) Shirli-Ann Siddall	6–4, 4–6, 6–2
