= Laura Glitz =

American tennis player

- Country (sports): United States
- Born: May 17, 1967 (age 57)
- Prize money: $57,581

Singles
- Career record: 32–82
- Highest ranking: No. 332 (July 15, 1991)

Doubles
- Career record: 50–66
- Highest ranking: No. 109 (October 5, 1992)

Grand Slam doubles results
- Australian Open: 1R (1992, 1993)
- French Open: 2R (1992)
- Wimbledon: 1R (1992)
- US Open: 1R (1992)

Laura Glitz (born May 17, 1967) is an American former professional tennis player.

== Biography ==
Growing up in York, Pennsylvania, Glitz was the PIAA state singles champion in 1984, while a student at York Suburban High School.

Glitz played college tennis for Arizona State University at No. 1 singles and doubles. A doubles All-American in 1987, she served as team captain in her junior and senior years, before graduating in 1990.

In the early 1990s she spent four years competing on the professional tour. Most of her WTA Tour main draw appearances were in doubles and included a runner-up finish at the 1991 Brasil Open. In 1992 she featured in the main draw of the women's doubles at all four grand slam tournaments.

Since 2007, Glitz has been the head coach of the Purdue University women's tennis team.

== WTA Tour finals ==
=== Doubles (0–1) ===
Result	Date	Tournament	Tier	Surface	Partner	Opponents	Score
Loss	Dec 1991	São Paulo, Brazil	Tier V	Clay	(United States) Renata Baranski	(Argentina) Inés Gorrochategui (Argentina) Mercedes Paz	2–6, 2–6
