= Gail Biggs =

Australian tennis player

- Country (sports): Australia
- Born: 25 August 1970 (age 54)
- Prize money: $61,859

Singles
- Career record: 128–145
- Career titles: 1 ITF
- Highest ranking: No. 200 (9 February 1998)

Grand Slam singles results
- Australian Open: 1R (1996)

Doubles
- Career record: 119–111
- Career titles: 7 ITF
- Highest ranking: No. 178 (17 July 1995)

Grand Slam doubles results
- Australian Open: 1R (1998)

Gail Biggs (born 25 August 1970) is a former professional tennis player from Australia.

Biggs, who comes from Queensland, played on the professional tour in the 1990s. Competing as a wildcard, she featured in the singles main draw of the 1996 Australian Open, where she was beaten in the first round by Ludmila Richterová. She won an ITF singles title at Mount Pleasant in 1997 and the following year reached her best ranking of 200 in the world.

== ITF Circuit finals ==
=== Singles: 2 (1–1) ===
Legend
$25,000 tournaments
$10,000 tournaments

Outcome	No.	Date	Tournament	Surface	Opponent	Score
Runner-up	1.	13 March 1995	ITF Canberra, Australia	Grass	(Hong Kong) Tang Min	2–6, 0–6
Winner	1.	22 June 1997	ITF Mount Pleasant, United States	Hard	(Mexico) Jessica Fernández	6–3, 4–6, 7–5

=== Doubles: 19 (7–12) ===
Outcome	No.	Date	Tournament	Surface	Partner	Opponents	Score
Winner	1.	25 July 1994	ITF Roanoke, United States	Hard	(New Zealand) Claudine Toleafoa	(Puerto Rico) Kristina Brandi (United States) Karin Miller	4–6, 6–3, 7–5
Runner-up	1.	1 August 1994	ITF Norfolk, United States	Hard	(New Zealand) Claudine Toleafoa	(United States) Karin Miller (United States) Varalee Sureephong	3–6, 6–4, 2–6
Winner	2.	8 August 1994	ITF College Park, United States	Hard	(Slovenia) Tjaša Jezernik	(United States) Marissa Catlin (United States) Lindsay Lee-Waters	6–4, 7–5
Winner	3.	5 March 1995	ITF Warrnambool, Australia	Hard	(Australia) Nicole Oomens	(Australia) Trudi Musgrave (Australia) Jane Taylor	6–1, 7–5
Runner-up	2.	12 March 1995	ITF Wodonga, Australia	Hard	(Australia) Nicole Oomens	(Australia) Trudi Musgrave (Australia) Jane Taylor	3–6, 2–6
Runner-up	3.	19 March 1995	ITF Canberra, Australia	Hard	(Australia) Nicole Oomens	(Australia) Trudi Musgrave (Australia) Jane Taylor	3–6, 6–7
Winner	4.	26 March 1995	ITF Bendigo, Australia	Hard	(Australia) Nicole Oomens	(Australia) Trudi Musgrave (Australia) Jane Taylor	7–6, 7–5
Winner	5.	3 July 1995	ITF Williamsburg, United States	Hard	(Australia) Nicole Oomens	(Brazil) Renata Brito (Brazil) Renata Diez	6–1, 6–2
Runner-up	4.	10 July 1995	ITF Easton, United States	Hard	(Australia) Nicole Oomens	(United States) Karin Miller (United States) Varalee Sureephong	2–6, 6–7^{(4–7)}
Runner-up	5.	9 March 1996	ITF Warrnambool, Australia	Grass	(Australia) Nicole Oomens	(Australia) Joanne Limmer (Australia) Lisa McShea	7–6^{(8–6)}, 3–6, 3–6
Winner	6.	13 October 1996	ITF Ibaraki, Japan	Hard	(Australia) Lisa McShea	(Japan) Keiko Nagatomi (Japan) Yuka Tanaka	7–5, 6–3
Winner	7.	20 October 1996	ITF Kugayama, Japan	Hard	(Australia) Lisa McShea	(Japan) Keiko Nagatomi (Japan) Kiyoko Yazawa	6–0, 6–2
Runner-up	6.	28 October 1996	ITF Kyoto, Japan	Carpet (i)	(Australia) Lisa McShea	(Japan) Keiko Nagatomi (Japan) Yuka Tanaka	6–7^{(4–7)}, 6–2, 2–6
Runner-up	7.	28 July 1997	ITF Ilkley, United Kingdom	Grass	(Russia) Julia Lutrova	(Australia) Trudi Musgrave (Australia) Cindy Watson	1–6, 1–6
Runner-up	8.	2 March 1998	ITF Warrnambool, Australia	Grass	(New Zealand) Shelley Stephens	(Australia) Lisa McShea (Australia) Alicia Molik	3–6, 1–6
Runner-up	9.	26 April 1998	ITF Shenzhen, China	Hard	(Japan) Tomoe Hotta	(Australia) Catherine Barclay (South Korea) Kim Eun-ha	3–6, 2–6
Runner-up	10.	5 July 1998	ITF Edmond, United States	Hard	(Australia) Bryanne Stewart	(Australia) Melissa Beadman (Australia) Siobhan Drake-Brockman	6–7, 6–7
Runner-up	11.	12 October 1998	ITF Kooralbyn,, Australia	Hard	(New Zealand) Shelley Stephens	(Australia) Lisa McShea (Australia) Trudi Musgrave	3–6, 6–7^{(5–7)}
Runner-up	12.	1 February 1999	ITF Wellington, New Zealand	Hard	(New Zealand) Shelley Stephens	(New Zealand) Leanne Baker (New Zealand) Rewa Hudson	1–6, 1–6
