= Kate McDonald =

Australian tennis player

Kate Hergeaves
- Full name: Kate Hergeaves (McDonald)
- Country (sports): Australia
- Born: 21 March 1970 (age 55)
- Plays: Right-handed
- Prize money: $73,323

Singles
- Career titles: 2 ITF
- Highest ranking: No. 187 (5 November 1990)

Grand Slam singles results
- Australian Open: 2R (1990)
- French Open: 1R (1990)

Doubles
- Career titles: 15 ITF
- Highest ranking: No. 103 (2 April 1990)

Grand Slam doubles results
- Australian Open: 2R (1988, 1990, 1993, 1994)
- French Open: 1R (1990)
- Wimbledon: 1R (1989, 1990, 1993)

Kate Hergeaves (born 21 March 1970) is a former professional tennis player from Australia. She competed during her tennis career under her maiden name Kate McDonald.

== Biography ==
A right-handed player from Albury, McDonald was the girls' doubles runner-up partnering Rennae Stubbs at the 1988 Australian Open. As a professional player she competed in the main draw of the Australian Open, French Open and Wimbledon during her career. She was most successful in the doubles format, with a top ranking of 103 in the world.

Now known as Kate Hergeaves, she has remained involved in tennis as a coach.

== ITF finals ==
$25,000 tournaments
$10,000 tournaments

=== Singles (2–3) ===
| Result | No. | Date | Tournament | Surface | Opponent | Score |
|---|---|---|---|---|---|---|
| Loss | 1. | 27 March 1988 | ITF Melbourne, Australia | Hard | (Australia) Rachel McQuillan | 4–6, 6–7 |
| Win | 1. | 6 November 1988 | ITF Lenzerheide, Switzerland | Carpet (i) | (Switzerland) Gabrielle Villiger | 6–2, 6–1 |
| Loss | 2. | 3 December 1989 | ITF Melbourne, Australia | Hard | (Australia) Nicole Bradtke | 6–1, 0–6, 5–7 |
| Loss | 3. | 8 December 1991 | ITF Perth, Australia | Hard | (Australia) Jenny Byrne | 2–6, 4–6 |
| Win | 2. | 9 March 1992 | ITF Wodonga, Australia | Grass | (New Zealand) Julie Richardson | 6–0, 7–6 |

=== Doubles (15–14) ===
| Result | No. | Date | Tournament | Surface | Partner | Opponents | Score |
|---|---|---|---|---|---|---|---|
| Win | 1. | 8 June 1987 | ITF Carpi, Italy | Clay | (New Zealand) Hana Guy | (Czechoslovakia) Nora Bajčíková (Czechoslovakia) Petra Langrová | 6–7, 7–5, 7–5 |
| Loss | 1. | 15 June 1987 | ITF Salerno, Italy | Clay | (New Zealand) Hana Guy | (West Germany) Veronika Martinek (Romania) Daniela Moise | 6–7, 2–6 |
| Win | 2. | 22 June 1987 | ITF Francavilla, Italy | Clay | (West Germany) Martina Pawlik | (Australia) Michelle Bowrey (Australia) Kristine Kunce | 6–4, 6–3 |
| Loss | 2. | 6 March 1988 | Newcastle, Australia | Grass | (Australia) Rennae Stubbs | (Australia) Rachel McQuillan (Australia) Jo-Anne Faull | 1–6, 3–6 |
| Loss | 3. | 21 March 1988 | Melbourne, Australia | Hard | (Australia) Kristin Godridge | (Australia) Rachel McQuillan (Australia) Rennae Stubbs | 4–6, 5–7 |
| Win | 3. | 26 September 1988 | Bol, Yugoslavia | Clay | (Australia) Rennae Stubbs | (Czechoslovakia) Magdalena Šimková (Czechoslovakia) Eva Švíglerová | 6–3, 6–1 |
| Win | 4. | 9 October 1988 | Mali Lošinj, Yugoslavia | Clay | (Australia) Rennae Stubbs | (Poland) Sylwia Czopek (Poland) Magdalena Feistel | 6–3, 1–6, 6–2 |
| Win | 5. | 16 October 1988 | Rabac, Yugoslavia | Clay | (Australia) Rennae Stubbs | (Czechoslovakia) Alice Noháčová (Czechoslovakia) Andrea Strnadová | 6–0, 6–4 |
| Win | 6. | 30 October 1988 | Baden, Switzerland | Hard (i) | (Australia) Rennae Stubbs | (Poland) Katarzyna Nowak (Finland) Petra Thorén | 6–2, 6–0 |
| Win | 7. | 6 November 1988 | Lenzerheide, Switzerland | Carpet (i) | (Australia) Rennae Stubbs | (Czechoslovakia) Karin Baleková (Czechoslovakia) Andrea Strnadová | 6–4, 2–6, 6–0 |
| Loss | 4. | 19 February 1989 | Adelaide, Australia | Hard | (Australia) Rennae Stubbs | (Australia) Kristin Godridge (Australia) Janine Thompson | 7–5, 2–6, 2–6 |
| Loss | 5. | 26 February 1989 | Melbourne, Australia | Hard | (Australia) Rennae Stubbs | (Australia) Sally McCann (Australia) Janine Thompson | 3–6, 2–6 |
| Loss | 6. | 5 March 1989 | Canberra, Australia | Hard | (Australia) Rennae Stubbs | (Hong Kong) Paulette Moreno (Japan) Shiho Okada | 4–6, 2–6 |
| Win | 8. | 12 March 1989 | Newcastle, Australia | Grass | (Australia) Rennae Stubbs | (Australia) Sally McCann (Australia) Janine Thompson | 7–6^{(5)}, 4–6, 6–3 |
| Loss | 7. | 17 April 1989 | Caserta, Italy | Hard | (Finland) Nanne Dahlman | (Soviet Union) Eugenia Maniokova (Soviet Union) Natalia Medvedeva | 4–6, 4–6 |
| Loss | 8. | 30 April 1989 | Verona, Italy | Clay | (Australia) Janine Thompson | (Australia) Rachel McQuillan (Australia) Kristine Kunce | 7–5, 4–6, 0–6 |
| Win | 9. | 9 July 1989 | Cava Tirr, Italy | Clay | (Australia) Rennae Stubbs | (United States) Anne Grousbeck (Netherlands) Titia Wilmink | 2–6, 6–1, 6–1 |
| Loss | 9. | 15 October 1989 | Nagasaki, Japan | Hard | (Japan) Tamaka Takagi | (Japan) Ei Iida (Japan) Maya Kidowaki | 2–6, 6–3, 2–6 |
| Win | 10. | 19 November 1989 | Gold Coast, Australia | Hard | (Australia) Kristine Kunce | (Australia) Louise Stacey (Australia) Jane Taylor | 6–4, 6–2 |
| Win | 11. | 8 December 1991 | Perth, Australia | Hard | (Australia) Kirrily Sharpe | (Australia) Narelle Kimpton (Australia) Stephanie Martin | 6–2, 6–2 |
| Loss | 10. | 2 March 1992 | Mildura, Australia | Grass | (Australia) Kirrily Sharpe | (New Zealand) Julie Richardson (New Zealand) Amanda Trail | 6–7^{(5)}, 6–7^{(3)} |
| Loss | 11. | 7 March 1993 | Mildura, Australia | Grass | (Australia) Jane Taylor | (Australia) Catherine Barclay (Australia) Kirrily Sharpe | 1–6, 2–6 |
| Win | 12. | 14 March 1993 | Wodonga, Australia | Grass | (Australia) Jane Taylor | (Australia) Robyn Mawdsley (Australia) Danielle Thomas | 2–6, 6–3, 6–3 |
| Win | 13. | 21 March 1993 | Canberra, Australia | Grass | (Australia) Jane Taylor | (Australia) Maija Avotins (Australia) Robyn Mawdsley | w/o |
| Win | 14. | 28 March 1993 | ITF Bendigo, Australia | Grass | (Australia) Jane Taylor | (Australia) Maija Avotins (Australia) Esther Knox | 6–3, 6–1 |
| Loss | 12. | 5 April 1993 | ITF Bangkok, Thailand | Hard | (United States) Amy deLone | (Thailand) Suvimol Duangchan (Ukraine) Irina Sukhova | 3–6, 2–6 |
| Loss | 13. | 5 July 1993 | ITF Indianapolis, United States | Hard | (United States) Stephanie Reece | (Japan) Yuko Hosoki (Japan) Naoko Kijimuta | 5–7, 3–6 |
| Loss | 14. | 13 March 1994 | ITF Warrnambool, Australia | Hard | (Australia) Jane Taylor | (Australia) Nicole Oomens (Australia) Shannon Peters | w/o |
| Win | 15. | 20 March 1994 | ITF Canberra, Australia | Grass | (Australia) Angie Cunningham | (Japan) Atsuko Shintani (Japan) Haruko Shigekawa | 6–2, 6–2 |
