= Jana Novotná =

Czech tennis player (1968–2017)

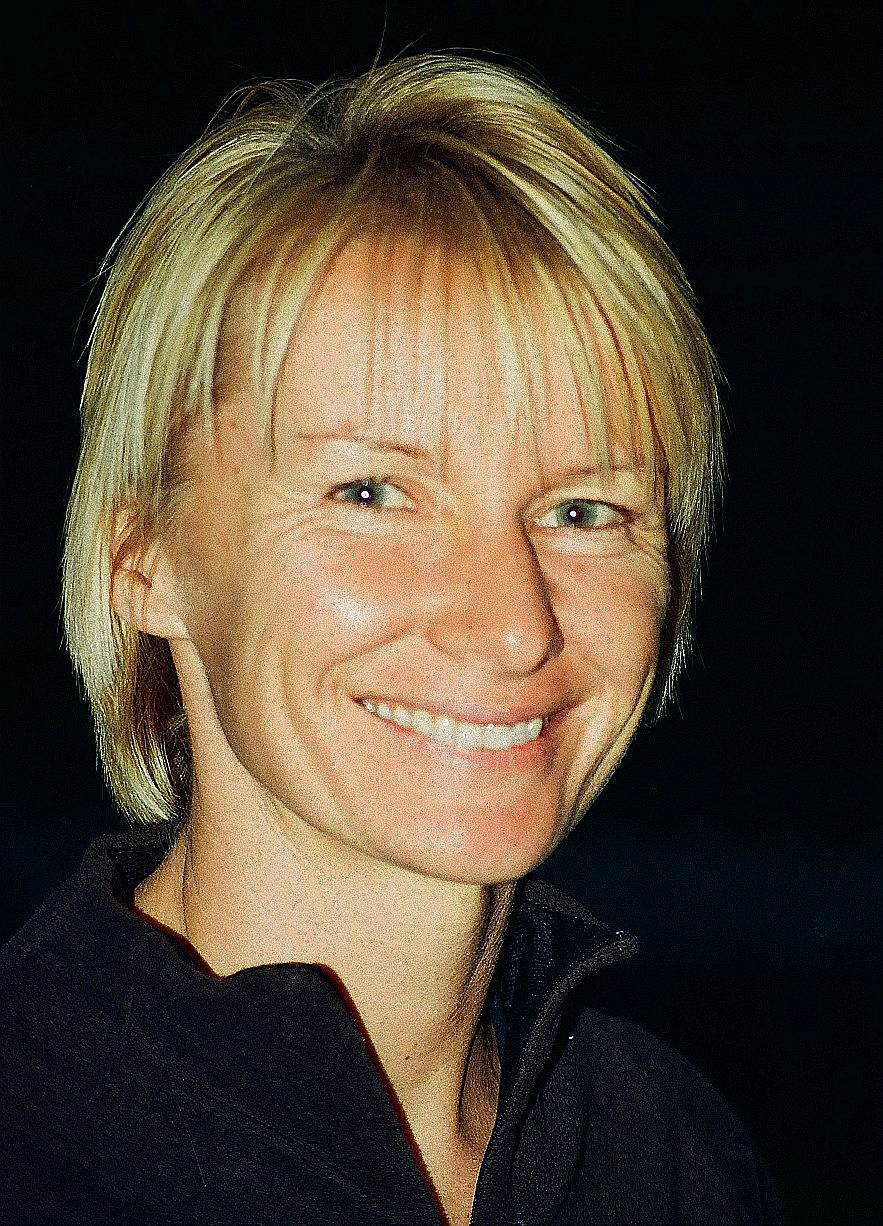
- Novotná in 1996
- Country (sports): Czechoslovakia (1987–1992); Czech Republic (1993–1999)
- Born: 2 October 1968 Brno, Czechoslovakia (now Czech Republic)
- Died: 19 November 2017 (aged 49) Czech Republic
- Height: 1.75 m (5 ft 9 in)
- Turned pro: 1987
- Retired: 1999
- Plays: Right-handed (one-handed backhand)
- Prize money: $11,249,284
- Int. Tennis HoF: 2005 (member page)

Singles
- Career record: 571–225
- Career titles: 24
- Highest ranking: No. 2 (7 July 1997)

Grand Slam singles results
- Australian Open: F (1991)
- French Open: SF (1990, 1996)
- Wimbledon: W (1998)
- US Open: SF (1994, 1998)

Other tournaments
- Grand Slam Cup: QF (1998)
- Tour Finals: W (1997)

Doubles
- Career record: 697–153
- Career titles: 76
- Highest ranking: No. 1 (27 August 1990)

Grand Slam doubles results
- Australian Open: W (1990, 1995)
- French Open: W (1990, 1991, 1998)
- Wimbledon: W (1989, 1990, 1995, 1998)
- US Open: W (1994, 1997, 1998)

Other doubles tournaments
- Tour Finals: W (1995, 1997)

Mixed doubles
- Career titles: 4

Grand Slam mixed doubles results
- Australian Open: W (1988, 1989)
- French Open: 2R (1992)
- Wimbledon: W (1989)
- US Open: W (1988)

Team competitions
- Fed Cup: W (1988)
- Hopman Cup: W (1994)
Medal record
Women's tennis
Olympic Games
Representing Czechoslovakia
Silver medal – second place	1988 Seoul	Doubles
Representing Czech Republic
Silver medal – second place	1996 Atlanta	Doubles
Bronze medal – third place	1996 Atlanta	Singles

Jana Novotná (Czech pronunciation: [ˈjana ˈnovotnaː]; 2 October 1968 – 19 November 2017) was a Czech professional tennis player. She was ranked world No. 2 in women's singles by the Women's Tennis Association (WTA), achieved in July 1997, and as the world No. 1 in women's doubles for 67 weeks. Novotná won 24 WTA Tour–level singles titles, including the 1998 Wimbledon Championships, and was runner-up in three other singles majors. She also won twelve major women's doubles titles (completing a double career Grand Slam), four major mixed doubles titles, and three Olympic medals. Novotná played a serve-and-volley game, an increasingly rare style of play among women during her career.

== Career ==
Novotná turned professional in February 1987. She was known primarily for her success as a doubles player in the early years of her career. Novotná began to have success in singles in the early 1990s, once four-time Grand Slam singles champion Hana Mandlíková became her coach. Mandlíková coached her for nine years. Her earlier coach was Mike Estep.

=== 1990 ===
At the 1990 French Open, Novotná, seeded 11th, achieved her best results in Grand Slam singles play up until that point. Having reached the round of 16, she faced Argentinian Gabriela Sabatini (seeded fourth). In their four previous meetings Sabatini got the better of her three times, including two straight-set wins. This time proved to be different, as Novotná turned the tables on her. Although Novotná had disposed of Sabatini, she would have to face yet another difficult opponent in the quarterfinals, Katerina Maleeva (seeded eighth) from Bulgaria. In their two previous meetings Novotná had lost both times, and after Maleeva won the opening set, it appeared Novotná was about to lose to her for a third consecutive time; however, she recovered and eventually won. Despite her success, Novotná's toughest test would be against top-seeded Steffi Graf of Germany in the semifinals. When Novotná had faced her three years earlier at the 1987 French Open, Graf won in straight sets. Now, Graf again defeated her without dropping a set. She qualified for the first time for the season-ending Virginia Slims Championships in which she was beaten in the first round by Sabatini. She finished the year ranked No. 13.

=== 1991 ===
Novotná enjoyed an excellent start to the 1991 season at the Australian Open, where she was seeded tenth and beat Zina Garrison-Jackson 7–6, 6–4 in the round of 16 to advance to the quarterfinal. The path to the final became considerably more difficult, as Novotná had to contend with top-seeded Steffi Graf in the quarterfinal encounter. In their ten previous meetings, Novotná had lost each time against Graf.

However, this time Novotná achieved the upset of her life by defeating Graf, the reigning champion of the last three years, 5–7, 6–4, 8–6. Now just one win away from her first-ever Grand Slam final, Novotná had to stop Arantxa Sánchez Vicario in the semifinals to get there; this she did, setting up a showdown against Monica Seles in the final. Seles eventually won in three sets. At the end of the year Novotná was ranked No. 7.

=== 1993 ===
Two years later, at Wimbledon, Novotná's game hit full stride, as she played some of her finest tennis ever. But for Novotná (seeded eighth) to capture the title, her path would have to go through Sabatini (seeded fourth), Martina Navratilova (seeded second) and top-seeded Steffi Graf. Going into her quarterfinal against Sabatini, Novotná had lost six consecutive matches against the Argentine. This time, she took Sabatini apart in straight sets, prevailing 6–4, 6–3. Novotná then set her sights on a semifinal clash against Martina Navratilova, who had won each of their previous five matches. However, Novotná defeated Navratilova, setting up the Championship match against Graf. After losing a tight first set, Novotná took the second set and then had a game point serving at 4–1 in the third set. With victory seemingly within her grasp, she lost her nerve, double-faulted, and allowed Graf to recover. Graf took the next five games and the title. During the prize presentation ceremony, a distraught Novotná burst into tears and cried on the Duchess of Kent's shoulder. The Duchess comforted her. Novotná achieved a year-end ranking of No. 6.

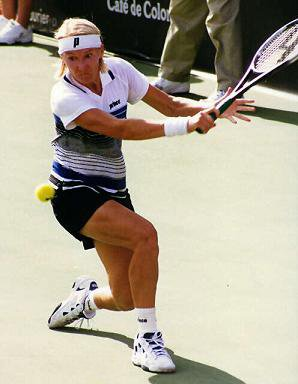
Novotná hitting a slice backhand

=== 1994 ===
She began the 1994 season by reaching the quarterfinals of the Australian Open. In her quarterfinal match, she played Gabriela Sabatini, in what turned out to be their last head-to-head encounter. In their previous meeting, on the grasscourts at the 1993 Wimbledon Championships, Novotná beat Sabatini in a straight-set quarterfinal victory. This time, on the Australian hardcourts, Sabatini defeated Novotná in straight sets. At the French Open, Novotná was beaten in the first round by Anna Smashnova in straight sets. At Wimbledon, Novotná reached the quarterfinals where she again faced Martina Navratilova in a rematch from the previous year. Novotná lost in three sets. At the season's final Grand Slam, the US Open, the seventh seeded Novotná worked her way to the semifinals where she played top-seeded Steffi Graf. Dating back to the 1992 French Open, Novotná had lost nine consecutive matches against Graf. This trend would continue as Graf defeated Novotná in straight sets in the US Open semifinal.

=== 1997 ===
It took four years for Novotná to reach another Wimbledon final. In 1997, she faced top-seeded Martina Hingis, and lost in three sets. But to get back to the final, Novotná had to get past Mary Joe Fernández in the round of 16. She outlasted Fernandez, then defeated Yayuk Basuki of Indonesia in the quarterfinals in straight sets. Now back in the semifinals of Wimbledon, her next opponent would be Arantxa Sánchez Vicario. She had prevailed against Novotná in seven of their nine previous contests, but the majority of those matches were played on clay and hard-courts, at which Sánchez Vicario excelled.

On grass, Novotná had a decided advantage, as she defeated Sánchez Vicario in straight sets. In the final against Hingis, she started out fast, taking the opening set 6–2. But Hingis found her stroke and won the second set 6–3 to even the match at one set apiece. The final set proved to be a mirror image of the second set, as Hingis prevailed 6–3, handing Novotná her second loss in a Wimbledon Championship match.

However, Novotná won the Tour Championships after a victory in the final over Mary Pierce and finished the year ranked a career-high world No. 2 in singles. In addition to winning the Tour Championships, Novotná captured three more WTA singles titles for the year.

=== 1998: Wimbledon victory ===
Her moment of Wimbledon success finally arrived in 1998. After defeating Venus Williams in a close quarterfinal, Novotná avenged the previous year's loss by ousting Martina Hingis in the semifinal in straight sets. She won the singles title by defeating veteran Nathalie Tauziat in the final in two sets. She became the oldest first-time Grand Slam singles winner in the Open Era at age 29 years and nine months. This record would be eclipsed by Francesca Schiavone in 2010 when she won the French Open at 29 years and eleven months and by Flavia Pennetta in 2015 when she won the US Open in 2015 at 33 years and six months.

Novotná won 12 Grand Slam women's doubles titles (four at Wimbledon, three at the French Open, three at the US Open, and two at the Australian Open) and four mixed-doubles titles (two at the Australian Open, one at Wimbledon, and one at the US Open).

Novotná was a member of the Czechoslovak team that won the Fed Cup in 1988. At the Olympic Games she was a women's doubles silver medalist in 1988 and 1996, and a singles bronze medalist in 1996.

She won titles on all four surfaces and crossed the $10 million mark in career prize money in 1998, the fifth player to reach the milestone. She won more than 500 career singles matches, the 15th woman in the Open Era to accomplish the feat.

Novotná was named the 1998 WTA Tour Doubles Team of the Year with Martina Hingis, the 1997 International Tennis Federation Doubles Team of the Year with Lindsay Davenport, the 1996 WTA Tour Doubles Team of the Year with Arantxa Sánchez Vicario, with Gigi Fernández in 1991 and in 1989 and 1990 with Helena Suková.

== Later years and death ==
Novotná retired from the professional tour in 1999. During her 14-year career, she won 104 titles (24 in singles, 76 in women's doubles and 4 in mixed doubles). She was inducted into the International Tennis Hall of Fame in 2005.

From 2000 to 2002, Novotná was a commentator for Wimbledon for the BBC. From 2006 onward, Novotná played the Ladies' Invitation Doubles tournament at Wimbledon; winning it in 2006, 2007, 2008, 2010 and 2014. In 2010, her partner was Martina Navratilova. Also in 2010, she helped Navratilova through her treatment for breast cancer. She played invitational doubles in the other Grand Slams as well and also did charity events and exhibitions. She continued to coach players, including Grand Slam champion Barbora Krejčíková.

Novotná lived in Florida until 2010, when she returned to her native Czech Republic. She bought a house and property in the village of Omice, near her home city of Brno, where she lived with her partner, Polish former tennis player Iwona Kuczyńska. She died of cancer on 19 November 2017 at the age of 49. She chose to keep her diagnosis of cancer private, telling only her closest friends and relatives.

== Grand Slam performance timelines ==
Key
W	F	SF	QF	#R	RR	Q#	DNQ	A	NH

(W) winner; (F) finalist; (SF) semifinalist; (QF) quarterfinalist; (#R) rounds 4, 3, 2, 1; (RR) round-robin stage; (Q#) qualification round; (DNQ) did not qualify; (A) absent; (NH) not held; (SR) strike rate (events won / competed); (W–L) win–loss record.

=== Singles ===
	Czechoslovakia								Czech Republic							
Tournament	1985	1986	1987	1988	1989	1990	1991	1992	1993	1994	1995	1996	1997	1998	1999	W–L
Australian Open	A	NH	A	1R	3R	3R	F	4R	2R	QF	4R	A	A	A	3R	23–9
French Open	A	1R	3R	1R	QF	SF	QF	4R	QF	1R	3R	SF	3R	QF	4R	38–14
Wimbledon	A	1R	4R	2R	4R	QF	2R	3R	F	QF	SF	QF	F	W	QF	50–13
US Open	A	Q2	4R	1R	2R	QF	4R	1R	4R	SF	QF	QF	QF	SF	3R	38–13
Career statistics
Year-end ranking	306	171	47	35	11	13	7	10	6	4	11	5	2	3	NR	149–49

=== Doubles ===
Tournament	1986	1987	1988	1989	1990	1991	1992	1993	1994	1995	1996	1997	1998	1999	SR	W–L
Australian Open	NH	A	QF	SF	W	F	QF	QF	SF	W	A	A	A	3R	2 / 9	36–7
French Open	2R	3R	A	SF	W	W	SF	F	A	F	SF	3R	W	QF	3 / 12	48–9
Wimbledon	Q1	2R	3R	W	W	F	F	F	F	W	QF	QF	W	SF	4 / 13	56–8
US Open	A	3R	3R	3R	F	F	F	2R	W	QF	F	W	W	3R	3 / 13	49–10
Win–loss	1–1	5–3	7–3	16–3	23–1	21–3	17–4	14–4	15–2	20–2	12–3	11–2	18–0	11–4	12 / 47	189–34
Career statistics
Year-end ranking	137	24	13	5	2	1	4	4	4	2	3	6	3	NR		

=== Mixed doubles ===
	Czechoslovakia					Czech Republic		
Tournament	1988	1989	1990	1991	1992	1993	1994	W–L
Australian Open	W	W	A	A	A	A	A	10–0
French Open	A	A	A	A	2R	A	A	0–1
Wimbledon	2R	W	SF	A	QF	A	A	11–2
US Open	W	2R	A	A	A	A	F	10–2
