= Tami Whitlinger =

American tennis player (born 1968)

- ITF name: Tami Whitlinger-Jones
- Country (sports): United States
- Born: November 13, 1968 (age 57) Neenah, Wisconsin, U.S.
- Turned pro: 1989
- Retired: 1997
- College: Stanford
- Prize money: $752,250

Singles
- Career record: 167–154
- Career titles: 0
- Highest ranking: No. 41 (June 17, 1991)

Grand Slam singles results
- Australian Open: R3 (1990, 1992, 1996)
- French Open: R4 (1991)
- Wimbledon: R3 (1995)
- US Open: R3 (1989, 1996)

Doubles
- Career record: 53–89
- Career titles: 1
- Highest ranking: No. 60 (April 14, 1997)

Grand Slam doubles results
- Australian Open: R2 (1991, 1992)
- French Open: R1 (1991, 1992, 1995, 1996, 1997)
- Wimbledon: R3 (1991)
- US Open: R3 (1991)

Tami Whitlinger-Jones (née Whitlinger; born November 13, 1968) is a former professional tennis player from the United States.

Prior to turning professional, Whitlinger was a two-time All-American at Stanford University. Her first tournament victory as a professional came in 1989 at a USTA Circuit event in Greensboro, North Carolina. Her best result at a Grand Slam event was at the French Open in 1991, where she reached the fourth round. Her career-high singles ranking was world No. 41.

Whitlinger retired from the professional tour in 1997.

Whitlinger is married to Kelly Jones, another former professional tennis player, who was ranked the world-number-one men's doubles player in 1992.

Tami grew up in Neenah, Wisconsin. Professional tennis runs in her family: her twin sister Teri and her uncle John both played professionally. Tami is also the granddaughter of former professional basketball player Warren Whitlinger.
