= Donna Faber =

American tennis player

- Country (sports): United States
- Born: July 5, 1971 (age 53)
- Plays: left-handed (two-handed backhand)
- Prize money: $319,367

Singles
- Career record: 116-129
- Career titles: 0
- Highest ranking: No. 55 (June 25, 1990)

Grand Slam singles results
- Australian Open: 4R (1989, 1990)
- French Open: 2R (1988, 1990, 1992)
- Wimbledon: 3R (1989)
- US Open: 4R (1989)

Doubles
- Career record: 11-47
- Career titles: 0
- Highest ranking: No. 122 (December 2, 1991)

Grand Slam doubles results
- Australian Open: 3R (1991)
- French Open: 2R (1989, 1990)
- Wimbledon: Q2 (1990, 1993)

Donna Faber (born July 5, 1971) is a former professional tennis player. She competed in Grand Slam tournaments from 1988 to 1993.

== WTA Tour finals ==
=== Singles 2 (0–2) ===
Result	W/L	Date	Tournament	Surface	Opponent	Score
Loss	0–1	Nov 1990	São Paulo, Brazil	Clay	(Germany) Veronika Martinek	2–6, 4–6
Loss	0–2	Feb 1992	Wellington, New Zealand	Hard	(France) Noëlle van Lottum	4–6, 0–6
