= Kirrily Sharpe =

Australian tennis player

- Country (sports): Australia
- Born: 25 February 1973 (age 53) Sydney, Australia
- Height: 1.64 m (5 ft 5 in)
- Turned pro: 1989
- Plays: Left-handed
- Prize money: $164,929

Singles
- Career record: 144–113
- Career titles: 7 ITF
- Highest ranking: No. 147 (11 June 1990)

Grand Slam singles results
- Australian Open: 3R (1992)
- French Open: 3R (1990)
- Wimbledon: 1R (1993)

Doubles
- Career record: 146–87
- Career titles: 1 WTA, 13 ITF
- Highest ranking: No. 65 (15 July 1991)

Grand Slam doubles results
- Australian Open: 3R (1991)
- French Open: 2R (1992)
- Wimbledon: 2R (1990)

Kirrily Sharpe (born 25 February 1973) is an Australian former professional tennis player. She was ranked as the world No. 147 in women's singles by the WTA.

== Biography ==
Sharpe, a left-handed player from Sydney, trained with the Australian Institute of Sport in Canberra. She was a member of the Australian team which won the 1988 World Youth Cup, now known as the Junior Fed Cup.

While still only 17, she competed in the main draw of the 1990 French Open as a qualifier and scored an upset win over 14th seed Raffaella Reggi, en route to the third round. She also competed in junior Grand Slam events that year and made three finals. At the 1990 Wimbledon Championships, she was runner-up to Andrea Strnadová in the girls' singles, and was also a losing finalist in the girls' doubles, partnering Nicole Pratt. She won the girls' doubles title at the 1990 US Open with Kristin Godridge. The same pair won a WTA Tour doubles title at the 1990 Open Clarins in Paris.

A knee injury, suffered early in 1991, kept her out for most of the year and required a reconstruction.

Sharpe made the third round of the 1992 Australian Open as a wildcard, with wins over Silke Meier and Anna Földényi.

In her only singles main-draw appearance at Wimbledon in 1993, she had a first-round match up with world No. 1, Steffi Graf, who beat the Australian 6–0, 6–0, losing only 18 points in the process.

Sharpe retired from professional tennis after the 1996 season.

== WTA career finals ==
=== Doubles (1–0) ===
Result	Date	Tournament	Tier	Surface	Partner	Opponents	Score
Win	Sep 1990	Clarins Open, France	Tier IV	Clay	(Australia) Kristin Godridge	(France) Alexia Dechaume (France) Nathalie Herreman	4–6, 6–3, 6–1

== ITF finals ==
=== Singles (7–0) ===
$50,000 tournaments
$25,000 tournaments
$10,000 tournaments

Result	No.	Date	Tournament	Surface	Opponent	Score
Win	1.	12 February 1990	ITF Adelaide, Australia	Hard	(Australia) Nicole Pratt	2–6, 6–4, 6–1
Win	2.	11 March 1990	Bendigo, Australia	Hard	(Australia) Jane Taylor	6–0, 7–6
Win	3.	27 April 1992	Riccione, Italy	Clay	(Italy) Maria Francesca Bentivoglio	7–5, 6–3
Win	4.	7 March 1993	Mildura, Australia	Hard	(Australia) Jane Taylor	6–0, 4–6, 6–3
Win	5.	6 June 1994	ITF Elvas, Portugal	Hard	(Netherlands) Hanneke Ketelaars	6–2, 1–6, 6–3
Win	6.	18 July 1994	ITF Ilkley, United Kingdom	Grass	(United Kingdom) Shirli-Ann Siddall	7–5, 6–1
Win	7.	5 November 1995	ITF Saga, Japan	Grass	(Japan) Nana Smith	6–3, 4–6, 6–1

=== Doubles (13–16) ===
Result	No.	Date	Tournament	Surface	Partnering	Opponents	Score
Loss	1.	1 November 1987	ITF Gold Coast, Australia	Hard	(Australia) Janine Thompson	(Australia) Jo-Anne Faull (Australia) Rachel McQuillan	6–4, 3–6, 3–6
Win	1.	5 March 1990	Newcastle, Australia	Grass	(Australia) Angie Cunningham	(Japan) Yuko Hosoki (Japan) Ayako Hirose	3–6, 7–5, 6–4
Win	2.	13 May 1990	Swansea, United Kingdom	Clay	(Australia) Nicole Pratt	(Australia) Catherine Barclay (Australia) Louise Stacey	6–1, 6–2
Win	3.	20 May 1990	Bournemouth, United Kingdom	Clay	(Australia) Nicole Pratt	(Australia) Catherine Barclay (Australia) Louise Stacey	6–1, 6–2
Loss	2.	19 November 1990	Perth, Australia	Grass	(Australia) Kristin Godridge	(Australia) Jo-Anne Faull (Australia) Rennae Stubbs	2–6, 4–6
Win	4.	8 December 1991	Perth, Australia	Hard	(Australia) Kate McDonald	(Australia) Narelle Kimpton (Australia) Stephanie Martin	6–2, 6–2
Loss	3.	2 March 1992	Mildura, Australia	Grass	(Australia) Kate McDonald	(New Zealand) Julie Richardson (New Zealand) Amanda Trail	6–7^{(5)}, 6–7^{(3)}
Loss	4.	13 April 1992	Salerno, Italy	Hard	(Australia) Angie Cunningham	(Italy) Linda Ferrando (Italy) Silvia Farina Elia	1–6, 4–6
Win	5.	20 April 1992	Bari, Italy	Clay	(Australia) Justine Hodder	(Czechoslovakia) Eva Martincová (Czechoslovakia) Kateřina Kroupová-Šišková	6–2, 6–3
Loss	5.	13 July 1992	Sezze, Italy	Clay	(Australia) Justine Hodder	(Czechoslovakia) Ivana Jankovská (Czechoslovakia) Eva Melicharová	6–7^{(1)}, 7–5, 5–7
Win	6.	20 September 1992	Sofia, Bulgaria	Clay	(Commonwealth of Independent States) Karina Kuregian	(Bulgaria) Galia Angelova (Bulgaria) Lubomira Bacheva	7–6, 6–2
Win	7.	27 September 1992	Acireale, Italy	Hard	(Netherlands) Claire Wegink	(Spain) Ana Segura (Spain) Janet Souto	4–6, 6–1, 6–1
Loss	6.	23 November 1992	ITF Nuriootpa, Australia	Hard	(Poland) Magdalena Feistel	(Australia) Kerry-Anne Guse (Australia) Angie Cunningham	6–4, 6–7, 2–6
Win	8.	7 March 1993	ITF Mildura, Australia	Grass	(Australia) Catherine Barclay	(Australia) Kate McDonald (Australia) Jane Taylor	6–1, 6–2
Loss	7.	19 April 1993	ITF Bari, Italy	Clay	(Israel) Yael Segal	(Belgium) Laurence Courtois (Czech Republic) Eva Martincová	6–2, 4–6, 1–6
Loss	8.	14 November 1993	ITF Bendigo, Australia	Hard	(Australia) Jo-Anne Faull	(Australia) Catherine Barclay (Australia) Kerry-Anne Guse	2–6, 6–3, 6–7
Loss	9.	5 December 1993	ITF Mildura, Australia	Hard	(Australia) Jo-Anne Faull	(Australia) Catherine Barclay (Australia) Kerry-Anne Guse	3–6, 2–6
Loss	10.	28 May 1994	ITF Barcelona, Spain	Clay	(Netherlands) Maaike Koutstaal	(Spain) Eva Bes (Spain) Silvia Ramón-Cortés	1–6, 3–6
Loss	11.	3 July 1994	ITF Stuttgart, Germany	Hard	(Australia) Nicole Pratt	(Netherlands) Lara Bitter (Netherlands) Maaike Koutstaal	1–6, 2–6
Loss	12.	18 July 1994	ITF Ilkley, United Kingdom	Grass	(Australia) Justine Hodder	(United Kingdom) Shirli-Ann Siddall (United Kingdom) Jo Durie	7–5, 4–6, 4–6
Win	9.	28 November 1994	ITF Port Pirie, Australia	Hard	(Australia) Kristin Godridge	(United States) Shannan McCarthy (Australia) Rachel McQuillan	7–6^{(6)}, 6–2
Win	10.	5 December 1994	ITF Nuriootpa, Australia	Hard	(Australia) Kristin Godridge	(Australia) Catherine Barclay (Australia) Kerry-Anne Guse	6–2, 6–7^{(5)}, 6–4
Loss	13.	8 May 1995	ITF Szczecin, Poland	Clay	(Australia) Kristin Godridge	(Australia) Catherine Barclay (United Kingdom) Shirli-Ann Siddall	7–5, 5–7, 6–7
Loss	14.	30 October 1995	ITF Saga, Japan	Grass	(Australia) Robyn Mawdsley	(Australia) Danielle Jones (South Africa) Tessa Price	4–6, 2–6
Win	11.	27 November 1995	ITF Mount Gambier, Australia	Hard	(Australia) Annabel Ellwood	(Croatia) Maja Murić (France) Catherine Tanvier	6–4, 6–1
Win	12.	11 December 1995	ITF Nuriootpa, Australia	Hard	(Australia) Annabel Ellwood	(Croatia) Maja Murić (Australia) Louise Pleming	6–4, 5–7, 6–4
Loss	15.	10 November 1996	ITF Mount Gambier, Australia	Hard	(Australia) Catherine Barclay	(Australia) Lisa McShea (Australia) Joanne Limmer	4–6, 6–2, 5–7
Win	13.	17 November 1996	ITF Port Pirie, Australia	Hard	(Australia) Catherine Barclay	(Australia) Lisa McShea (Australia) Joanne Limmer	7–6, 7–6
Loss	16.	24 November 1996	ITF Nuriootpa, Australia	Hard	(Australia) Rachel McQuillan	(Czech Republic) Eva Martincová (Czech Republic) Alena Vašková	3–6, 4–6
