= Joanne Limmer =

Australian tennis player (born 1974)

- Country (sports): Australia
- Born: 29 March 1974 (age 51)
- Plays: Right-handed
- Prize money: $69,325

Singles
- Career titles: 1 ITF
- Highest ranking: No. 141 (11 January 1993)

Grand Slam singles results
- Australian Open: 2R (1992)

Doubles
- Career titles: 5 ITF
- Highest ranking: No. 141 (25 November 1996)

Grand Slam doubles results
- Australian Open: 2R (1993)
- Wimbledon: 1R (1991, 1993)

Joanne Limmer (born 29 March 1974) is a former professional tennis player from Australia.

== Biography ==
Limmer, a right-handed player from Melbourne, began playing tennis at the age of six and had a successful junior career. Most notably, she won the girls' singles title at the 1992 Australian Open, where she beat Lindsay Davenport in the final. This came after she had competed in the senior main draw that year and reached the second round by beating world No. 38 Emanuela Zardo.

As a professional player, she had a best ranking of 141 in the world, which she attained in 1993. Her best win on the WTA Tour came against Rosalyn Fairbank, the ninth seed at the 1993 edition of the Brisbane Hardcourt Championships. In doubles, she appeared twice in the main draw at Wimbledon and won five titles on the ITF Circuit.

Limmer retired from the tour in 1997.

== ITF Circuit finals ==
$25,000 tournaments
$10,000 tournaments

=== Singles (1–2) ===
Result	No.	Date	Tournament	Surface	Opponent	Score
Win	1.	3 March 1991	Canberra, Australia	Grass	(Australia) Clare Thompson	7–5, 6–4
Loss	1.	19 May 1991	Bournemouth, United Kingdom	Hard	(Australia) Angie Cunningham	3–6, 6–3, 3–6
Loss	2.	16 November 1992	Port Pirie, Australia	Hard	(South Africa) Tessa Price	6–3, 3–6, 1–6

=== Doubles (5–9) ===
Result	No.	Date	Tournament	Surface	Partner	Opponents	Score
Loss	1.	12 February 1990	Adelaide, Australia	Hard	(Australia) Maija Avotins	(Australia) Catherine Barclay (Australia) Kerry-Anne Guse	0–6, 0–6
Win	1.	19 May 1991	Bournemouth, United Kingdom	Hard	(Australia) Angie Cunningham	(South Africa) Joannette Kruger (South Africa) Cindy Summers	6–0, 6–2
Loss	2.	16 November 1992	Port Pirie, Australia	Hard	(Australia) Robyn Mawdsley	(Australia) Danielle Jones (South Africa) Tessa Price	2–6, 7–5, 3–6
Loss	3.	4 December 1995	Port Pirie, Australia	Hard	(South Africa) Mareze Joubert	(Australia) Jenny Byrne (Australia) Catherine Barclay	1–6, 3–6
Win	2.	9 March 1996	Warrnambool, Australia	Grass	(Australia) Lisa McShea	(Australia) Gail Biggs (Australia) Nicole Oomens	6–7^{(6)}, 6–3, 6–3
Loss	4.	16 March 1996	Victoria, Australia	Carpet (i)	(Australia) Lisa McShea	(Australia) Trudi Musgrave (Australia) Jane Taylor	4–6, 7–5, 4–6
Loss	5.	31 March 1996	Albury, Australia	Grass	(Australia) Lisa McShea	(Australia) Trudi Musgrave (Australia) Jane Taylor	0–6, 3–6
Loss	6.	23 June 1996	Peachtree, United States	Hard	(Australia) Lisa McShea	(United States) Erica Adams (Georgia (country)) Nino Louarsabishvili	3–6, 6–7^{(4)}
Win	3.	7 July 1996	Williamsburg, United States	Hard	(Australia) Lisa McShea	(United States) Ania Bleszynski (United States) Katie Schlukebir	6–1, 6–1
Win	4.	14 July 1996	Easton, United States	Hard	(Australia) Lisa McShea	(United States) Audra Brannon (United States) Kristin Osmond	7–5, 6–2
Win	5.	10 November 1996	Mount Gambier, Australia	Hard	(Australia) Lisa McShea	(Australia) Catherine Barclay (Australia) Kirrily Sharpe	6–4, 2–6, 7–5
Loss	7.	17 November 1996	Port Pirie, Australia	Hard	(Australia) Lisa McShea	(Australia) Catherine Barclay (Australia) Kirrily Sharpe	6–7^{(5)}, 6–7^{(6)}
Loss	8.	15 December 1996	Hope Island, Australia	Hard	(Australia) Lisa McShea	(Australia) Catherine Barclay (Australia) Kerry-Anne Guse	4–6, 4–6
Loss	9.	9 March 1997	Warrnambool, Australia	Grass	(Australia) Lisa McShea	(South Africa) Nannie de Villiers (United Kingdom) Shirli-Ann Siddall	4–6, 6–4, 6–7^{(5)}
