= Angie Cunningham =

Australian tennis player

- Full name: Angie Kate Cunningham nee Woolcock
- Country (sports): Australia
- Born: 2 February 1973 Launceston, Australia
- Died: 4 October 2016 (aged 43) Melbourne, Australia
- Prize money: $67,087

Singles
- Career titles: 3 ITF
- Highest ranking: No. 318 (17 April 1995)

Doubles
- Career titles: 7 ITF
- Highest ranking: No. 111 (10 May 1993)

Grand Slam doubles results
- Australian Open: 2R (1993)
- French Open: 2R (1992)
- Wimbledon: 1R (1991, 1993)
- US Open: 1R (1993)

Angie Kate Cunningham (2 February 1973 – 4 October 2016) was a professional tennis player from Australia. She competed during her career under her maiden name Angie Woolcock.

== Biography ==
=== Tennis career ===
Cunningham was born in Launceston. Cunningham won the Pardey Shield tennis title at the age of 13, which made her the youngest winner of the prestigious Tasmanian schools competition. She moved to Melbourne soon after to pursue a career in tennis and was accepted into the Australian Institute of Sport in Canberra.

Cunningham was runner-up in three junior Grand Slam doubles finals, twice at the Australian Open and once at Wimbledon. She partnered with Nicole Pratt to make the final of the 1989 Australian Open. She was a finalist again, in 1991, with Joanne Limmer. Cunningham beat Limmer to win her first ITF tournament in Woking, England, later in 1991. Cunningham eventually partnered with Limmer in order to reach the girls' doubles final at Wimbledon. Cunningham reached a highest junior doubles ranking of number two in the world.

She competed primarily in doubles as a professional tennis player. Her best performance on the WTA Tour was a semifinal appearance, partnering Jo-Anne Faull at the Malaysian Women's Open in 1993. Her career best doubles ranking was 111 in 1993. She competed in the women's doubles main draws at the four grand slam tournaments that year. She won two ITF singles titles: at Lee on Solent, and in Ballarat, in 1994

Cunningham retired from tennis in 1996. She studied for a business degree at La Trobe University after her tennis career. She started to work for the Women's Tennis Association in 2000, and she was based in London. Her roles during her ten year career at the WTA included being the Vice President of Player Relations and On-Site Operations.

=== Personal life and illness ===
Cunningham was the middle of three children born to Bill and Susie Woolcock. Her father ran the local real estate company, Woolcock Partners, for 40 years, before it was bought by her elder brother Sam in 2013. She had a husband Pat and two daughters.

She was diagnosed with motor neurone disease (MND) in 2012. She died on 4 October 2016 at her home in Melbourne, at the age of 43.

=== Honours ===
She posthumously received the President's Spirit of Tennis Award for her efforts to raise awareness of MND, at the 2016 Newcombe Medal awards ceremony.

The trophy for the Hobart International is named the Angie Cunningham Trophy in her honour.

== ITF finals ==
$50,000 tournaments
$25,000 tournaments
$10,000 tournaments

=== Singles (3–3) ===
Result	No.	Date	Tournament	Surface	Opponent	Score
Win	1.	19 May 1991	ITF Bournemouth, United Kingdom	Hard	(Australia) Joanne Limmer	6–3, 3–6, 6–3
Loss	1.	27 April 1992	ITF Sheffield, United Kingdom	Hard	(Commonwealth of Independent States) Svetlana Parkhomenko	3–6, 6–4, 4–6
Win	2.	13 March 1994	ITF Warrnambool, Australia	Hard	(Australia) Jane Taylor	w/o
Loss	2.	20 March 1994	ITF Canberra, Australia	Grass	(Hong Kong) Tang Min	3–6, 0–6
Win	3.	2 May 1994	ITF Lee-on-the-Solent, United Kingdom	Clay	(Greece) Christina Zachariadou	6–3, 6–4
Loss	3.	26 March 1995	ITF Bendigo, Australia	Hard	(Australia) Jane Taylor	0–6, 4–6

=== Doubles (7–6) ===
Result	No.	Date	Tournament	Surface	Partner	Opponents	Score
Win	1.	5 March 1990	ITF Newcastle, Australia	Grass	(Australia) Kirrily Sharpe	(Japan) Yuko Hosoki (Japan) Ayako Hirose	3–6, 7–5, 6–4
Loss	1.	30 September 1990	ITF Kuroshio, Japan	Clay	(Australia) Catherine Barclay	(Japan) Naoko Kinoshita (Japan) Emiko Takahashi	4–6, 6–4, 2–6
Loss	2.	14 October 1990	ITF Matsuyama, Japan	Clay	(Australia) Catherine Barclay	(Australia) Kerry-Anne Guse (Australia) Kristine Kunce	7–6, 3–6, ret.
Win	2.	19 May 1991	ITF Bournemouth, United Kingdom	Hard	(Australia) Joanne Limmer	(South Africa) Joannette Kruger (South Africa) Cindy Summers	6–0, 6–2
Loss	3.	8 July 1991	ITF Erlangen, Germany	Clay	(Australia) Louise Stacey	(Soviet Union) Viktoria Milvidskaia (Germany) Maja Živec-Škulj	4–6, 4–6
Win	3.	15 July 1991	ITF Darmstadt, Germany	Clay	(Australia) Louise Stacey	(Germany) Martina Pawlik (United States) Lisa Seemann	6–1, 6–2
Win	4.	3 February 1992	ITF Jakarta, Indonesia	Clay	(Australia) Nicole Pratt	(Romania) Ruxandra Dragomir (Romania) Irina Spîrlea	6–1, 6–0
Loss	4.	13 April 1992	ITF Salerno, Italy	Hard	(Australia) Kirrily Sharpe	(Italy) Linda Ferrando (Italy) Silvia Farina Elia	1–6, 4–6
Loss	5.	6 July 1992	ITF Erlangen, Germany	Clay	(Germany) Caroline Schneider	(China) Chen Li-Ling (Japan) Miki Yokobori	4–6, 2–6
Win	5.	23 November 1992	ITF Nuriootpa, Australia	Hard	(Australia) Kerry-Anne Guse	(Poland) Magdalena Feistel (Australia) Kirrily Sharpe	4–6, 7–6, 6–2
Win	6.	20 December 1992	ITF Brisbane, Australia	Grass	(Australia) Justine Hodder	(Australia) Kerry-Anne Guse (Australia) Kristine Kunce	6–4, 3–6, 6–2
Win	7.	20 March 1994	ITF Canberra, Australia	Grass	(Australia) Kate McDonald	(Japan) Atsuko Shintani (Japan) Haruko Shigekawa	6–2, 6–2
Loss	6.	4 September 1995	ITF Spoleto, Italy	Clay	(Republic of Ireland) Karen Nugent	(Italy) Cristina Salvi (Italy) Elena Savoldi	6–1, 6–7, 2–6
