= 1987 Virginia Slims of Indianapolis – Singles =

Singles
- 1987 Virginia Slims of Indianapolis

Final
- Champion: (United States) Halle Cioffi
- Runner-up: (United States) Anne Smith
- Score: 4–6, 6–4, 7–6^{(12–10)}

Details
- Draw: 56 (4Q/1LL)
- Seeds: 14

Events
Singles	Doubles
← 1986 ·	Virginia Slims of Indianapolis	· 1988 →

Zina Garrison was the defending champion, but did not compete this year.

Halle Cioffi won the title by defeating Anne Smith 4–6, 6–4, 7–6^{(12–10)} in the final.

== Seeds ==
The first eight seeds received a bye into the second round.

1. (United States) Barbara Potter (quarterfinals)
2. (United States) Kate Gompert (third round)
3. (Canada) Helen Kelesi (third round)
4. (United States) Kathleen Horvath (second round, retired)
5. (Soviet Union) Natasha Zvereva (third round)
6. (United States) Stephanie Rehe (second round, retired)
7. (United States) Terry Phelps (quarterfinals)
8. (United States) Alycia Moulton (second round)
9. (United States) Elly Hakami (quarterfinals)
10. (United States) Melissa Gurney (first round)
11. (United States) Gretchen Rush (quarterfinals)
12. (United States) Beverly Bowes (first round)
13. (United States) Michelle Torres (third round)
14. (United States) Hu Na (semifinals)

== Draw ==
=== Key ===
- Q = Qualifier
- WC = Wild card
- LL = Lucky loser
- Alt = Alternate
- SE = Special exempt
- PR = Protected ranking
- ITF = ITF entry
- JE = Junior exempt
- w/o = Walkover
- r = Retired
- d = Defaulted
- SR = Special ranking

=== Finals ===
Quarterfinals
1	(United States) Barbara Potter	7	2^{r}
(United States) Halle Cioffi	5	5
(Soviet Union) Leila Meskhi	6	6
7	(United States) Terry Phelps	2	4
14	(United States) Hu Na	6	6
11	(United States) Gretchen Rush	1	2
(United States) Anne Smith	6	6
9	(United States) Elly Hakami	4	0

Semifinals
(United States) Halle Cioffi	5	6	6
(Soviet Union) Leila Meskhi	7	0	4
14	(United States) Hu Na	6	2	4
(United States) Anne Smith	0	6	6

Final
(United States) Halle Cioffi	4	6	7^{12}
(United States) Anne Smith	6	4	6^{10}

=== Top half ===
==== Section 1 ====
First round
(United States) S Sloane	0	6	7
(United States) P Casale	6	3	6
(United States) V Nelson-Dunbar	4	2
(United States) L Antonoplis	6	6
(United States) C MacGregor	2	0
13	(United States) M Torres	6	6
(United States) H Cioffi	6	6
(United States) G Purdy	3	3
(United States) P Louie Harper	7	6
(Czechoslovakia) A Holíková	5	1
(United States) A Schwartz	4	0
(Netherlands) M Mesker	6	6

Second round
1	(United States) B Potter	7	6
(United States) S Sloane	5	2
(United States) L Antonoplis	3	0
13	(United States) M Torres	6	6
(United States) H Cioffi	6	6
(United States) P Louie Harper	0	3
(Netherlands) M Mesker	4	4
6	(United States) S Rehe	6	2^{r}

Third round
1	(United States) B Potter	6	6
13	(United States) M Torres	3	2
(United States) H Cioffi	2	7	6
(Netherlands) M Mesker	6	6	3

Quarterfinals
1	(United States) B Potter	7	2^{r}
(United States) H Cioffi	5	5

==== Section 2 ====
First round
Q	(United States) J Thomas	3	3
(Netherlands) M Bollegraf	6	6
LL	(United States) S Reece	6	6
(United States) J Klitch	1	2
(Soviet Union) L Meskhi	7	6
10	(United States) M Gurney	5	0
12	(United States) B Bowes	7	5	0^{r}
(United States) S Mascarin	5	7	0
(United States) Jane Holdren	6	6	1
(United States) C Benjamin	4	7	6
(United States) G Kim	4	6	1
(United States) H Ludloff	6	1	6

Second round
3	(Canada) H Kelesi	7	6
(Netherlands) M Bollegraf	6	3
LL	(United States) S Reece	4	3
(Soviet Union) L Meskhi	6	6
(United States) S Mascarin	6	6
(United States) C Benjamin	2	0
(United States) H Ludloff	3	6
7	(United States) T Phelps	6	7

Third round
3	(Canada) H Kelesi	3	1
(Soviet Union) L Meskhi	6	6
(United States) S Mascarin	2	3
7	(United States) T Phelps	6	6

Quarterfinals
(Soviet Union) L Meskhi	6	6
7	(United States) T Phelps	2	4

=== Bottom half ===
==== Section 3 ====
First round
(United States) T Mochizuki	4	7	4
(Netherlands) B Schultz	6	6	6
(United States) D Hansel	6	3	3
(South Africa) J Mundel	4	6	6
(Australia) E Minter	3	6	0
14	(United States) H Na	6	1	6
11	(United States) G Magers	6	6
(Sweden) M Lindström	1	2
(Australia) L Field	3	5
(Soviet Union) N Bykova	6	7
(Italy) L Golarsa	6	3	6
(Australia) M Jaggard	2	6	7

Second round
5	(Soviet Union) N Zvereva	0	7	6
(Netherlands) B Schultz	6	6	4
(South Africa) J Mundel	2	3
14	(United States) H Na	6	6
11	(United States) G Magers	6	6
(Soviet Union) N Bykova	1	3
(Australia) M Jaggard	7
4	(United States) K Horvath	5	r

Third round
5	(Soviet Union) N Zvereva	3	3
14	(United States) H Na	6	6
11	(United States) G Magers	6	6
(Australia) M Jaggard	4	1

Quarterfinals
14	(United States) H Na	6	6
11	(United States) G Magers	1	2

==== Section 4 ====
First round
(United States) A Smith	5	6	6
(Poland) R Baranski	7	1	3
(United States) P Barg	7	4	2
(Netherlands) H ter Riet	5	6	6
(Brazil) C Monteiro	7	5	2
(Hong Kong) P Hy	6	7	6
9	(United States) E Hakami	7	6
(Australia) J Byrne	5	4
(Netherlands) M van der Torre	7	6	7
(United States) L Allen	6	7	3
(United States) AM Fernandez	0	3
Q	(United States) D Faber	6	6

Second round
8	(United States) A Moulton	1	2
(United States) A Smith	6	6
(Netherlands) H ter Riet	2	6	6
(Hong Kong) P Hy	6	4	2
9	(United States) E Hakami	7	6
(Netherlands) M van der Torre	5	1
Q	(United States) D Faber	4	2
2	(United States) K Gompert	6	6

Third round
(United States) A Smith	6	6
(Netherlands) H ter Riet	3	4
9	(United States) E Hakami	6	6
2	(United States) K Gompert	3	4

Quarterfinals
(United States) A Smith	6	6
9	(United States) E Hakami	4	0
