= 1993 Danone Women's Open – Singles =

Singles
- 1993 Danone Women's Open

Final
- Champion: (Spain) Conchita Martínez
- Runner-up: (Bulgaria) Magdalena Maleeva
- Score: 6–3, 6–4

Details
- Draw: 56 (3WC/8Q/2LL)
- Seeds: 16

Events
Singles	Doubles
← 1992 ·	Danone Australian Hardcourt Championships	· 1994 →

Nicole Provis was the defending champion, but did not compete this year.

Conchita Martínez won the title by defeating Magdalena Maleeva 6–3, 6–4 in the final.

== Seeds ==
The top eight seeds received a bye to the second round.

1. (Spain) Conchita Martínez (champion)
2. (Bulgaria) Magdalena Maleeva (final)
3. (Belgium) Sabine Appelmans (second round)
4. (France) Julie Halard (third round)
5. (Slovakia) Radka Zrubáková (third round)
6. (Czech Republic) Andrea Strnadová (second round)
7. (Australia) Rachel McQuillan (quarterfinals)
8. (Netherlands) Manon Bollegraf (third round)
9. (South Africa) Rosalyn Fairbank-Nideffer (first round)
10. (United States) Debbie Graham (first round)
11. (Argentina) Florencia Labat (quarterfinals)
12. (France) Alexia Dechaume (first round)
13. (Chinese Taipei) Wang Shi-ting (semifinals)
14. (Italy) Federica Bonsignori (first round)
15. (Slovakia) Karina Habšudová (first round)
16. (Finland) Nanne Dahlman (first round)

== Draw ==
Key

- Q = Qualifier
- WC = Wild card
- LL = Lucky loser
- Alt = Alternate
- ITF = ITF entry
- PR = Protected ranking
- SR = Special ranking
- SE = Special exempt
- JE = Junior exempt
- JR = Junior Accelerator Programme entrant
- CO = College Accelerator Programme entrant
- NG = Next Gen Accelerator Program entrant
- w/o = Walkover
- r = Retired
- d = Defaulted

=== Finals ===
Quarterfinals
1	(Spain) Conchita Martínez	6	6
Q	(Mexico) Angélica Gavaldón	3	3
Q	(Australia) Michelle Jaggard-Lai	6	3	7^{9}
(France) Noëlle van Lottum	1	6	6^{7}
11	(Argentina) Florencia Labat	4	3
13	(Chinese Taipei) Wang Shi-ting	6	6
7	(Australia) Rachel McQuillan	3	2
2	(Bulgaria) Magdalena Maleeva	6	6

Semifinals
1	(Spain) Conchita Martínez	7	6
Q	(Australia) Michelle Jaggard-Lai	5	3
13	(Chinese Taipei) Wang Shi-ting	4	5
2	(Bulgaria) Magdalena Maleeva	6	7

Final
1	(Spain) Conchita Martínez	6	6
2	(Bulgaria) Magdalena Maleeva	3	4

=== Top half ===
==== Section 1 ====
First round
(South Africa) J Kruger	5	6	2
(China) F Li	7	1	6
LL	(Netherlands) M Oremans	6	6
(Belgium) D Monami	1	1
WC	(Australia) J Limmer	7^{7}	1	6
9	(South Africa) R Fairbank-Nideffer	6^{5}	6	4
12	(France) A Dechaume	4	4
(France) S Testud	6	6
Q	(Mexico) A Gavaldón	6	6
(United States) B Bowes	2	1
(Italy) F Perfetti	5	3
(Netherlands) S Rottier	7	6

Second round
1	(Spain) C Martínez	6	6
(China) F Li	3	1
LL	(Netherlands) M Oremans	6	6
WC	(Australia) J Limmer	4	4
(France) S Testud	4	4
Q	(Mexico) A Gavaldón	6	6
(Netherlands) S Rottier	6	6
6	(Czech Republic) A Strnadová	2	2

Third round
1	(Spain) C Martínez	6	3	6
LL	(Netherlands) M Oremans	3	6	3
Q	(Mexico) A Gavaldón	6	4	6
(Netherlands) S Rottier	1	6	1

Quarterfinals
1	(Spain) C Martínez	6	6
Q	(Mexico) A Gavaldón	3	3

==== Section 2 ====
First round
(Australia) J Byrne	4	5
Q	(Australia) M Jaggard-Lai	6	7
(United States) D Faber	6^{3}	1
(Finland) P Thorén	7^{7}	6
(Italy) N Baudone	3	6	6
15	(Slovakia) K Habšudová	6	2	3
14	(Italy) F Bonsignori	2	6	3
(Australia) R Stubbs	6	3	6
Q	(Japan) R Hiraki	4	6^{5}
(France) N van Lottum	6	7^{7}
(United States) C Rubin	6	6
(South Africa) T Price	2	4

Second round
3	(Belgium) S Appelmans	6^{2}	6	2
Q	(Australia) M Jaggard-Lai	7^{7}	1	6
(Finland) P Thorén	3	4
(Italy) N Baudone	6	6
(Australia) R Stubbs
(France) N van Lottum	w/o
(United States) C Rubin	3	6	4
8	(Netherlands) M Bollegraf	6	1	6

Third round
Q	(Australia) M Jaggard-Lai	6	7^{7}
(Italy) N Baudone	3	6^{3}
(France) N van Lottum	4	6	7
8	(Netherlands) M Bollegraf	6	2	5

Quarterfinals
Q	(Australia) M Jaggard-Lai	6	3	7^{9}
(France) N van Lottum	1	6	6^{7}

=== Bottom half ===
==== Section 3 ====
First round
Q	(Italy) M Grossi	7^{7}	2	2
(Italy) L Golarsa	6^{5}	6	6
(United States) K Po	6	6
WC	(Australia) K Godridge	4	3
(Poland) K Nowak	2	3
11	(Argentina) F Labat	6	6
13	(Chinese Taipei) S-t Wang	3	6	6
WC	(Australia) L McShea	6	0	1
LL	(Hungary) A Földényi	4	6	3
(United States) E deLone	6	4	6
Q	(Canada) M Drake	5	7	6
(Hungary) A Temesvári-Trunkos	7	5	3

Second round
5	(Slovakia) R Zrubáková	6	7
(Italy) L Golarsa	3	5
(United States) K Po	4	2
11	(Argentina) F Labat	6	6
13	(Chinese Taipei) S-t Wang	6	6
(United States) E deLone	4	3
Q	(Canada) M Drake	5	3
4	(France) J Halard	7	6

Third round
5	(Slovakia) R Zrubáková	1	5
11	(Argentina) F Labat	6	7
13	(Chinese Taipei) S-t Wang	6	6
4	(France) J Halard	3	1

Quarterfinals
11	(Argentina) F Labat	4	3
13	(Chinese Taipei) S-t Wang	6	6

==== Section 4 ====
First round
(Argentina) I Gorrochategui	6	6
(Japan) N Miyagi	4	0
(Italy) G Pizzichini	6	6
(Russia) E Maniokova	1	2
Q	(Australia) N Pratt	6	6
10	(United States) D Graham	4	4
16	(Finland) N Dahlman	0	5
Q	(United States) L Davenport	6	7
Q	(United Kingdom) C Wood	6	7^{10}
(Canada) R Simpson-Alter	3	6^{8}
(Netherlands) N Muns-Jagerman	6	7
(Germany) C Porwik	1	5

Second round
7	(Australia) R McQuillan	6	6
(Argentina) I Gorrochategui	3	4
(Italy) G Pizzichini	0	3
Q	(Australia) N Pratt	6	6
Q	(United States) L Davenport	6	6
Q	(United Kingdom) C Wood	3	2
(Netherlands) N Muns-Jagerman	2	2
2	(Bulgaria) M Maleeva	6	6

Third round
7	(Australia) R McQuillan	6	6
Q	(Australia) N Pratt	4	3
Q	(United States) L Davenport	3	2
2	(Bulgaria) M Maleeva	6	6

Quarterfinals
7	(Australia) R McQuillan	3	2
2	(Bulgaria) M Maleeva	6	6
