= 1987 Virginia Slims of Indianapolis =

- Date: October 25 – November 1
- Edition: 8th
- Category: Category 1+
- Draw: 56S / 24D
- Prize money: $75,000
- Surface: Hard / outdoor
- Location: Indianapolis, Indiana, U.S.
- Venue: Indianapolis Racquet Club

Champions

Singles
- (United States) Halle Cioffi

Doubles
- (Australia) Jenny Byrne (Australia) Michelle Jaggard
← 1986 ·	Virginia Slims of Indianapolis	· 1988 →

The 1987 Virginia Slims of Indianapolis was a women's tennis tournament played on outdoor hard courts at the Indianapolis Racquet Club in Indianapolis, Indiana in the United States and was part of the Category 1+ tier of the 1987 WTA Tour. It was the eighth edition of the tournament and ran from October 25 through November 1, 1987. Unseeded Halle Cioffi won the singles title.

== Finals ==
=== Singles ===
(United States) Halle Cioffi defeated (United States) Anne Smith 4–6, 6–4, 7–6^{(12–10)}

- It was Cioffi's only title of her career.

=== Doubles ===
(Australia) Jenny Byrne / (Australia) Michelle Jaggard defeated (United States) Beverly Bowes / (United States) Hu Na 6–2, 6–3
