= 1993 Danone Women's Open – Doubles =

Doubles
- 1993 Danone Women's Open

Final
- Champions: (Spain) Conchita Martínez (Latvia) Larisa Neiland
- Runners-up: (United States) Shannan McCarthy (United States) Kimberly Po
- Score: 6–2, 6–2

Details
- Draw: 28 (1WC/1Q/1LL)
- Seeds: 8

Events
Singles	Doubles
- Danone Australian Hardcourt Championships

Jana Novotná and Larisa Neiland were the defending champions, but Novotná did not compete this year.

Neiland teamed up with Conchita Martínez and successfully defended her title, by defeating Shannan McCarthy and Kimberly Po 6–2, 6–2 in the final.

== Seeds ==
The top four seeds received a bye to the second round.

1. (Spain) Conchita Martínez / (Latvia) Larisa Neiland (champions)
2. (United States) Katrina Adams / (Netherlands) Manon Bollegraf (second round)
3. (Germany) Claudia Porwik / (Czech Republic) Andrea Strnadová (second round)
4. (Australia) ~~Elizabeth Smylie~~ / (Australia) ~~Rennae Stubbs~~ (Withdrew)
5. (South Africa) Rosalyn Fairbank-Nideffer / (New Zealand) Julie Richardson (second round)
6. (France) Alexia Dechaume / (Argentina) Florencia Labat (semifinals)
7. (Australia) Rachel McQuillan / (France) Noëlle van Lottum (first round)
8. (Slovakia) Karina Habšudová / (Germany) Barbara Rittner (second round)

== Draw ==
Key

- Q = Qualifier
- WC = Wild card
- LL = Lucky loser
- Alt = Alternate
- ITF = ITF entry
- PR = Protected ranking
- SR = Special ranking
- SE = Special exempt
- JE = Junior exempt
- JR = Junior Accelerator Programme entrant
- CO = College Accelerator Programme entrant
- NG = Next Gen Accelerator Program entrant
- w/o = Walkover
- r = Retired
- d = Defaulted

=== Finals ===
Semifinals
1	(Spain) Conchita Martínez (Latvia) Larisa Neiland	6	4	6
6	(France) Alexia Dechaume (Argentina) Florencia Labat	3	6	3
(United States) Nicole Arendt (United States) Jessica Emmons	4	3
Q	(United States) Shannan McCarthy (United States) Kimberly Po	6	6

Final
1	(Spain) Conchita Martínez (Latvia) Larisa Neiland	6	6
Q	(United States) Shannan McCarthy (United States) Kimberly Po	2	2

=== Top half ===
First round
(Argentina) I Gorrochategui (Netherlands) N Muns-Jagerman	6	6
(Australia) J Byrne (Australia) JA Faull	3	3
(Australia) T Morton (United Kingdom) C Wood	6	7
(Australia) C Barclay (Australia) J Limmer	4	5
(Australia) L Pleming (Sweden) M Stradlund	3	7^{7}	7
7	(Australia) R McQuillan (France) N van Lottum	6	6^{4}	5
(Japan) R Hiraki (Mexico) L Novelo	4	6	1
(Australia) M Jaggard-Lai (Canada) R Simpson-Alter	6	2	6
(Australia) L Field (Australia) K Godridge	3	6	6
(United States) L Davenport (United States) C Rubin	6	3	4
(Finland) P Thorén (Slovakia) R Zrubáková
6	(France) A Dechaume (Argentina) F Labat	w/o

Second round
1	(Spain) C Martínez (Latvia) L Neiland	7^{7}	6
(Argentina) I Gorrochategui (Netherlands) N Muns-Jagerman	6^{0}	3
(Australia) T Morton (United Kingdom) C Wood	6	6^{3}	7
(Australia) L Pleming (Sweden) M Stradlund	1	7^{7}	5
3	(Germany) C Porwik (Czech Republic) A Strnadová	6	5	4
(Australia) M Jaggard-Lai (Canada) R Simpson-Alter	4	7	6
(Australia) L Field (Australia) K Godridge	0	0
6	(France) A Dechaume (Argentina) F Labat	6	6

Quarterfinals
1	(Spain) C Martínez (Latvia) L Neiland	6	6
(Australia) T Morton (United Kingdom) C Wood	1	3
(Australia) M Jaggard-Lai (Canada) R Simpson-Alter	3	6	2
6	(France) A Dechaume (Argentina) F Labat	6	1	6

Semifinals
1	(Spain) C Martínez (Latvia) L Neiland	6	4	6
6	(France) A Dechaume (Argentina) F Labat	3	6	3

=== Bottom half ===
First round
5	(South Africa) R Fairbank-Nideffer (New Zealand) J Richardson	1	6	6
(Italy) L Golarsa (Hungary) A Temesvári-Trunkos	6	4	2
(Australia) J Hodder (Australia) A Woolcock	6^{5}	3
(United States) N Arendt (United States) J Emmons	7^{7}	6
(Japan) N Miyagi (United States) P O'Reilly	2	1
(Japan) E Iida (Australia) K Radford	6	6
8	(Slovakia) K Habšudová (Germany) B Rittner	7^{7}	6
(Belgium) S Appelmans (France) J Halard	6^{3}	2
(United States) B Bowes (United States) T Witthington	6	3	6^{7}
Q	(United States) S McCarthy (United States) K Po	4	6	7^{9}
(Netherlands) M Kiene (Netherlands) M Oremans	6	5	6
WC	(Australia) N Pratt (Australia) K Sharpe	3	7	3

Second round
5	(South Africa) R Fairbank-Nideffer (New Zealand) J Richardson	4	5
(United States) N Arendt (United States) J Emmons	6	7
(Japan) E Iida (Australia) K Radford	3	7	6
LL	(Italy) N Baudone (United Kingdom) A Grunfeld	6	5	0
8	(Slovakia) K Habšudová (Germany) B Rittner	4	6^{5}
Q	(United States) S McCarthy (United States) K Po	6	7^{7}
(Netherlands) M Kiene (Netherlands) M Oremans	6	6
2	(United States) K Adams (Netherlands) M Bollegraf	1	2

Quarterfinals
(United States) N Arendt (United States) J Emmons	6	4	6
(Japan) E Iida (Australia) K Radford	0	6	4
Q	(United States) S McCarthy (United States) K Po	6	6^{5}	6
(Netherlands) M Kiene (Netherlands) M Oremans	4	7^{7}	1

Semifinals
(United States) N Arendt (United States) J Emmons	4	3
Q	(United States) S McCarthy (United States) K Po	6	6
