= 1988 Virginia Slims of Indianapolis – Doubles =

Doubles
- 1988 Virginia Slims of Indianapolis
- 1987 Champions: (Australia) Jenny Byrne (Australia) Michelle Jaggard

Final
- Champions: (Soviet Union) Larisa Savchenko (Soviet Union) Natasha Zvereva
- Runners-up: (United States) Katrina Adams (United States) Zina Garrison
- Score: 6–2, 6–1

Events
Singles	Doubles
← 1987 ·	Virginia Slims of Indianapolis	· 1989 →

Jenny Byrne and Michelle Jaggard were the defending champions but they competed with different partners that year, Byrne with Janine Tremelling and Jaggard with Katerina Maleeva.

Byrne and Tremelling lost in the quarterfinals to Katrina Adams and Zina Garrison, as did Jaggard and Maleeva to Larisa Savchenko and Natasha Zvereva.

Savchenko and Zvereva won in the final 6–2, 6–1 against Adams and Garrison.

== Seeds ==
Champion seeds are indicated in bold text while text in italics indicates the round in which those seeds were eliminated.

1. (Soviet Union) **Larisa Savchenko** / (Soviet Union) **Natasha Zvereva (champions)**
2. (United States) Katrina Adams / (United States) Zina Garrison (final)
3. (United States) Elise Burgin / (South Africa) Rosalyn Fairbank (semifinals)
4. (United States) Beth Herr / (United States) Candy Reynolds (semifinals)

== Draw ==
=== Key ===
- Q = Qualifier
- WC = Wild card
- LL = Lucky loser
- Alt = Alternate
- SE = Special exempt
- PR = Protected ranking
- ITF = ITF entry
- JE = Junior exempt
- w/o = Walkover
- r = Retired
- d = Defaulted
- SR = Special ranking

First round
1	(Soviet Union) **L Savchenko** (Soviet Union) **N Zvereva**	**6**	**6**
(United States) M L Daniels (Hong Kong) P Hy	4	1
(United States) S Foltz (South Africa) J Mundel	1	2
(Australia) **M Jaggard** (Bulgaria) **K Maleeva**	**6**	**6**
4	(United States) **B Herr** (United States) **C Reynolds**	6	**6**	**6**
(United States) C Benjamin (Sweden) M Lindström	**7**	2	2
(United States) **A Henricksson** (United States) **G Magers**	**6**	3	**6**
(Soviet Union) L Meskhi (Soviet Union) S Parkhomenko	2	**6**	3
(United States) Ca MacGregor (United States) Cy MacGregor	4	4
(South Africa) **L Gregory** (United States) **R Reis**	**6**	**6**
(Canada) H Kelesi (United States) H Ludloff	5	1
3	(United States) **E Burgin** (South Africa) **R Fairbank**	**7**	**6**
(United States) E Hakami (South Africa) K Schimper	3	6
(Australia) **J Byrne** (Australia) **J Tremelling**	**6**	**7**
(United States) H Cioffi (United States) A Frazier	0	2
2	(United States) **K Adams** (United States) **Z Garrison**	**6**	**6**

Quarterfinals
1	(Soviet Union) **L Savchenko** (Soviet Union) **N Zvereva**	2	**7**	**6**
(Australia) M Jaggard (Bulgaria) K Maleeva	**6**	6	0
4	(United States) **B Herr** (United States) **C Reynolds**	4	**7**	**6**
(United States) A Henricksson (United States) G Magers	**6**	5	3
(South Africa) L Gregory (United States) R Reis	5	**7**	2
3	(United States) **E Burgin** (South Africa) **R Fairbank**	**7**	6	**6**
(Australia) J Byrne (Australia) J Tremelling	4	4
2	(United States) **K Adams** (United States) **Z Garrison**	**6**	**6**

Semifinals
1	(Soviet Union) **L Savchenko** (Soviet Union) **N Zvereva**	5	**6**	**7**
4	(United States) B Herr (United States) C Reynolds	**7**	3	6
3	(United States) E Burgin (South Africa) R Fairbank	4	3
2	(United States) **K Adams** (United States) **Z Garrison**	**6**	**6**

Final
1	(Soviet Union) **Larisa Savchenko** (Soviet Union) **Natasha Zvereva**	**6**	**6**
2	(United States) Katrina Adams (United States) Zina Garrison	2	1
