= 1989 Virginia Slims of Indianapolis – Singles =

Singles
- 1989 Virginia Slims of Indianapolis

Final
- Champion: (Bulgaria) Katerina Maleeva
- Runner-up: (Italy) Raffaella Reggi
- Score: 6–4, 6–4

Details
- Draw: 32 (4Q)
- Seeds: 8

Events
Singles	Doubles
← 1988 ·	Virginia Slims of Indianapolis	· 1990 →

Katerina Maleeva successfully defended her title, by defeating Raffaella Reggi 6–4, 6–4 in the final.

== Seeds ==
1. (Bulgaria) Katerina Maleeva (champion)
2. (Sweden) Catarina Lindqvist (first round)
3. (Italy) Raffaella Reggi (final)
4. (United States) Lori McNeil (second round)
5. (United States) Amy Frazier (semifinals)
6. (Soviet Union) Larisa Savchenko (quarterfinals)
7. (United States) Susan Sloane (first round)
8. (Netherlands) Manon Bollegraf (second round)

== Draw ==
=== Key ===
- Q = Qualifier
- WC = Wild card
- LL = Lucky loser
- Alt = Alternate
- SE = Special exempt
- PR = Protected ranking
- ITF = ITF entry
- JE = Junior exempt
- w/o = Walkover
- r = Retired
- d = Defaulted
- SR = Special ranking

=== Finals ===
Semifinals
1	(Bulgaria) Katerina Maleeva	6	6
5	(United States) Amy Frazier	4	3
3	(Italy) Raffaella Reggi	6	6
(United States) Ronni Reis	2	2

Final
1	(Bulgaria) Katerina Maleeva	6	6
3	(Italy) Raffaella Reggi	4	4

=== Top half ===
First round
1	(Bulgaria) K Maleeva	4	6	6
(United States) T Whitlinger	6	1	2
Q	(Japan) Y Koizumi	4	0
(West Germany) C Porwik	6	6
Q	(Poland) R Baranski	5	1
(Soviet Union) N Medvedeva	7	6
(Canada) J Hetherington	2	3
8	(Netherlands) M Bollegraf	6	6
4	(United States) L McNeil	6	6
(United States) LA Eldredge	4	3
(United States) H Cioffi	6	1	6
(United States) H Na	3	6	1
(Japan) E Inoue	6	6	6
Q	(Canada) M Drake	1	7	2
(Soviet Union) L Meskhi	4	7	3
5	(United States) A Frazier	6	6	6

Second round
1	(Bulgaria) K Maleeva	6	6
(West Germany) C Porwik	2	2
(Soviet Union) N Medvedeva	6	6
8	(Netherlands) M Bollegraf	4	2
4	(United States) L McNeil	6	3
(United States) H Cioffi	7	6
(Japan) E Inoue	6	6	1
5	(United States) A Frazier	4	7	6

Quarterfinals
1	(Bulgaria) K Maleeva	6	6
(Soviet Union) N Medvedeva	3	3
(United States) H Cioffi	3	2
5	(United States) A Frazier	6	6

Semifinals
1	(Bulgaria) K Maleeva	6	6
5	(United States) A Frazier	4	3

=== Bottom half ===
First round
6	(Soviet Union) L Savchenko	6	6
(Brazil) G Miró	4	0
(United States) H Lord	2	3
(Canada) R Simpson	6	6
(France) S Amiach	6	2	1
(United States) D Faber	3	6	6
(United States) S Martin	2	1
3	(Italy) R Reggi	6	6
7	(United States) S Sloane	7	6	2
(United States) K Adams	6	7	6
(Czechoslovakia) J Pospíšilová	4	6	6
Q	(United States) A Keller	6	4	2
(United States) K Kessaris	4	2
(United States) R Reis	6	6
(United States) S Foltz	4	7	6
2	(Sweden) C Lindqvist	6	5	4

Second round
6	(Soviet Union) L Savchenko	6	6
(Canada) R Simpson	2	3
(United States) D Faber	2	7	2
3	(Italy) R Reggi	6	5	6
(United States) K Adams	3	6	3
(Czechoslovakia) J Pospíšilová	6	4	6
(United States) R Reis	6	6
(United States) S Foltz	1	1

Quarterfinals
6	(Soviet Union) L Savchenko	6	4	0
3	(Italy) R Reggi	3	6	6
(Czechoslovakia) J Pospíšilová	3	6	4
(United States) R Reis	6	4	6

Semifinals
3	(Italy) R Reggi	6	6
(United States) R Reis	2	2
