= 1988 Virginia Slims of Indianapolis – Singles =

Singles
- 1988 Virginia Slims of Indianapolis
- 1987 Champion: (United States) Halle Cioffi

Final
- Champion: (Bulgaria) Katerina Maleeva
- Runner-up: (United States) Zina Garrison
- Score: 6–3, 2–6, 6–2

Events
Singles	Doubles
← 1987 ·	Virginia Slims of Indianapolis	· 1989 →

Halle Cioffi was the defending champion but lost in the second round to Gretchen Magers.

Katerina Maleeva won in the final 6–3, 2–6, 6–2 against Zina Garrison.

== Seeds ==
A champion seed is indicated in bold text while text in italics indicates the round in which that seed was eliminated.

1. (United States) Zina Garrison (final)
2. (Bulgaria) **Katerina Maleeva (champion)**
3. (United States) Stephanie Rehe (semifinals)
4. (Soviet Union) Larisa Savchenko (second round)
5. (Canada) Helen Kelesi (first round)
6. (Australia) Anne Minter (first round)
7. (United States) Halle Cioffi (second round)
8. (Soviet Union) Leila Meskhi (first round)

== Draw ==
=== Key ===
- Q = Qualifier
- WC = Wild card
- LL = Lucky loser
- Alt = Alternate
- SE = Special exempt
- PR = Protected ranking
- ITF = ITF entry
- JE = Junior exempt
- w/o = Walkover
- r = Retired
- d = Defaulted
- SR = Special ranking

First round
1	(United States) **Z Garrison**	**7**	**6**
(South Africa) K Schimper	6	1
(Soviet Union) S Parkhomenko	4	**6**	2
(Soviet Union) **N Bykova**	**6**	4	**6**
(South Africa) **R Fairbank**	**7**	**6**
Q	(United States) S Stafford	5	3
(United States) **H Na**	**7**	**7**
8	(Soviet Union) L Meskhi	6	6
4	(Soviet Union) **L Savchenko**	**6**	6	**6**
(South Africa) J Mundel	3	**7**	0
LL	(United States) B Herr	**6**	2	2
Q	(United States) **L Allen**	4	**6**	**6**
(United States) **R Reis**	**6**	**6**
Q	(South Africa) L Gregory	3	2
Q	(United States) **S Martin**	**6**	**6**
6	(Australia) A Minter	3	4
7	(United States) **H Cioffi**	**6**	**6**
(Japan) A Kijimuta	1	3
(United States) S Reece	2	3
(United States) **G Magers**	**6**	**6**
(United States) **M L Daniels**	6	**6**	**6**
(United States) E Burgin	**7**	3	4
(United States) B Bowes	**6**	1	4
3	(United States) **S Rehe**	3	**6**	**6**
5	(Canada) H Kelesi	5	4
(United States) **A Frazier**	**7**	**6**
(United States) **M Werdel**	**6**	**6**
(Poland) I Kuczyńska	4	4
(United States) **A Grossman**	**6**	**6**
(United States) M Torres	2	4
(United States) A Henricksson	3	**7**	3
2	(Bulgaria) **K Maleeva**	**6**	6	**6**

Second round
1	(United States) **Z Garrison**	**6**	**6**
(Soviet Union) N Bykova	0	3
(South Africa) R Fairbank	1	1
(United States) **H Na**	**6**	**6**
4	(Soviet Union) L Savchenko	1	**6**	2
Q	(United States) **L Allen**	**6**	2	**6**
(United States) R Reis	3	2
Q	(United States) **S Martin**	**6**	**6**
7	(United States) H Cioffi	1	4
(United States) **G Magers**	**6**	**6**
(United States) M L Daniels	1	4
3	(United States) **S Rehe**	**6**	**6**
(United States) **A Frazier**	**6**	**6**
(United States) M Werdel	1	2
(United States) A Grossman	6	**6**	6
2	(Bulgaria) **K Maleeva**	**7**	4	**7**

Quarterfinals
1	(United States) **Z Garrison**	**6**	**7**
(United States) H Na	1	6
Q	(United States) **L Allen**	**6**	**6**
Q	(United States) S Martin	3	1
(United States) G Magers	**7**	3	4
3	(United States) **S Rehe**	5	**6**	**6**
(United States) A Frazier	**6**	2	2
2	(Bulgaria) **K Maleeva**	2	**6**	**6**

Semifinals
1	(United States) **Z Garrison**	**6**	**6**
Q	(United States) L Allen	3	4
3	(United States) S Rehe	2	0
2	(Bulgaria) **K Maleeva**	**6**	**6**

Final
1	(United States) Zina Garrison	3	**6**	2
2	(Bulgaria) **Katerina Maleeva**	**6**	2	**6**
