= 1995 Schweppes Tasmanian International – Doubles =

Doubles
- 1995 Schweppes Tasmanian International
- 1994 Champions: (United States) Linda Harvey-Wild; (United States) Chanda Rubin

Final
- Champions: (Japan) Kyōko Nagatsuka; (Japan) Ai Sugiyama
- Runners-up: (Netherlands) Manon Bollegraf; (Latvia) Larisa Neiland
- Score: 2–6, 6–4, 6–2

Events
Singles	Doubles
← 1994 ·	Hobart International	· 1996 →

Linda Harvey-Wild and Chanda Rubin were the defending champions but they competed with different partners that year, Harvey-Wild with Leila Meskhi and Rubin with Kristie Boogert.

Harvey-Wild and Meskhi lost in the first round to Boogert and Rubin.

Boogert and Rubin lost in the quarter-finals to Vickie Paynter and Nicole Pratt.

Kyōko Nagatsuka and Ai Sugiyama won in the final 2–6, 6–4, 6–2 against Manon Bollegraf and Larisa Neiland.

== Seeds ==
Champion seeds are indicated in bold text while text in italics indicates the round in which those seeds were eliminated.

1. (Netherlands) Manon Bollegraf / (Latvia) Larisa Neiland (final)
2. n/a
3. (United States) Linda Harvey-Wild / (Georgia (country)) Leila Meskhi (first round)
4. (United States) Ginger Helgeson-Nielsen / (Australia) Rachel McQuillan (first round)

== Draw ==
=== Key ===
- Q = Qualifier
- WC = Wild card
- LL = Lucky loser
- Alt = Alternate
- SE = Special exempt
- PR = Protected ranking
- ITF = ITF entry
- JE = Junior exempt
- w/o = Walkover
- r = Retired
- d = Defaulted
- SR = Special ranking

First round

Quarter-finals

Semi-finals

Final

1
- (Netherlands) **M Bollegraf**
- (Latvia) **L Neiland**
**7**
**6**

WC
- (Australia) A Ellwood
- (Australia) A Woolcock
5
1

1
- (Netherlands) **M Bollegraf**
- (Latvia) **L Neiland**
**7**
**7**

- (Germany) M Babel
- (Sweden) Å Carlsson
1
4

- (Australia) K-A Guse
- (Canada) P Hy-Boulais
5
6

- (Australia) **K-A Guse**
- (Canada) **P Hy-Boulais**
**6**
**6**

1
- (Netherlands) **M Bollegraf**
- (Latvia) **L Neiland**
**6**
**6**

3
- (United States) L Harvey-Wild
- (Georgia (country)) L Meskhi
2
4

- (United States) V Paynter
- (Australia) N Pratt
4
3

- (Netherlands) **K Boogert**
- (United States) **C Rubin**
**6**
**6**

- (Netherlands) K Boogert
- (United States) C Rubin

- (United States) **V Paynter**
- (Australia) **N Pratt**
**6**
**6**

- (United States) **V Paynter**
- (Australia) **N Pratt**
**w/o**

- (Japan) Y Kamio
- (China) F Li
1
2

1
- (Netherlands) Manon Bollegraf
- (Latvia) Larisa Neiland
**6**
4
2

Q
- (Australia) L Pleming
- (France) C Tanvier
3
**6**
3

- (Japan) **Kyōko Nagatsuka**
- (Japan) **Ai Sugiyama**
2
**6**
**6**

LL
- (Austria) **B Reinstadler**
- (Austria) **B Schett**
**6**
3
**6**

LL
- (Austria) **B Reinstadler**
- (Austria) **B Schett**
3
**6**
**7**

- (United States) **N Arendt**
- (Germany) **C Singer**
**6**
**7**

- (United States) N Arendt
- (Germany) C Singer
**6**
2
5

4
- (United States) G Helgeson-Nielsen
- (Australia) R McQuillan
4
6

LL
- (Austria) B Reinstadler
- (Austria) B Schett
3
3

- (Belgium) **L Courtois**
- (France) **A Dechaume-Balleret**
**7**
**6**

- (Japan) **K Nagatsuka**
- (Japan) **A Sugiyama**
**6**
**6**

- (Romania) R Dragomir
- (Austria) P Schwarz
6
1

- (Belgium) L Courtois
- (France) A Dechaume-Balleret
2
6

- (Japan) **K Nagatsuka**
- (Japan) **A Sugiyama**
**6**
**7**

- (Japan) **K Nagatsuka**
- (Japan) **A Sugiyama**
**6**
**7**

LL
- (United States) E deLone
- (United States) A Keller
2
5
