= 1990 Jello Tennis Classic – Doubles =

Doubles
- 1990 Jello Tennis Classic

Final
- Champions: (United States) Patty Fendick (United States) Meredith McGrath
- Runners-up: (United States) Katrina Adams (Canada) Jill Hetherington
- Score: 6–1, 6–1

Details
- Draw: 16 (1WC/1Q)
- Seeds: 4

Events
Singles	Doubles
← 1989 ·	Virginia Slims of Indianapolis	· 1991 →

Katrina Adams and Lori McNeil were the defending champions but McNeil did not compete this year, as she chose to rest in order to compete at the Virginia Slims Championships the following week.

Adams teamed up with Jill Hetherington and lost in the final to Patty Fendick and Meredith McGrath. The score was 6–1, 6–1.

== Seeds ==
1. (United States) Patty Fendick / (United States) Meredith McGrath (champions)
2. (Australia) Nicole Provis / (South Africa) Elna Reinach (semifinals)
3. (Soviet Union) Natalia Medvedeva / (Soviet Union) Leila Meskhi (semifinals)
4. (United States) Katrina Adams / (Canada) Jill Hetherington (final)

== Draw ==
=== Key ===
- Q = Qualifier
- WC = Wild card
- LL = Lucky loser
- Alt = Alternate
- SE = Special exempt
- PR = Protected ranking
- ITF = ITF entry
- JE = Junior exempt
- w/o = Walkover
- r = Retired
- d = Defaulted
- SR = Special ranking

=== Draw ===
First round
1	(United States) P Fendick (United States) M McGrath	6	6
(United States) P Louie Harper (New Zealand) J Richardson	1	2
(United States) K Foxworth (United States) T Whittington	6	6
(Bulgaria) E Pampoulova (West Germany) C Porwik	4	2
3	(Soviet Union) N Medvedeva (Soviet Union) L Meskhi	6	6
Q	(United States) C Cunningham (Mexico) A Gavaldón	2	1
(Argentina) B Fulco (United States) E Hakami	6	7
(United States) S Collins (United States) L Spadea	4	5
(United States) L Allen (France) S Amiach	6	1	6
(United States) L Bartlett (United States) S Bartlett	2	6	4
WC	(United States) H Lord (United States) S Reece	2	1
4	(United States) K Adams (Canada) J Hetherington	6	6
(Italy) L Ferrando (Italy) R Reggi	7	6
(United States) D Faber (Finland) P Thorén	5	1
(United States) S Schefflin (United States) S Stafford	2	1
2	(Australia) N Provis (South Africa) E Reinach	6	6

Quarterfinals
1	(United States) P Fendick (United States) M McGrath	6	6
(United States) K Foxworth (United States) T Whittington	3	3
3	(Soviet Union) N Medvedeva (Soviet Union) L Meskhi	6	6
(Argentina) B Fulco (United States) E Hakami	2	2
(United States) L Allen (France) S Amiach	2	3
4	(United States) K Adams (Canada) J Hetherington	6	6
(Italy) L Ferrando (Italy) R Reggi	2	1
2	(Australia) N Provis (South Africa) E Reinach	6	6

Semifinals
1	(United States) P Fendick (United States) M McGrath	6	3	6
3	(Soviet Union) N Medvedeva (Soviet Union) L Meskhi	4	6	2
4	(United States) K Adams (Canada) J Hetherington	7^{7}	5	6
2	(Australia) N Provis (South Africa) E Reinach	6^{4}	7	4

Final
1	(United States) P Fendick (United States) M McGrath	6	6
4	(United States) K Adams (Canada) J Hetherington	1	1
