= 1989 Virginia Slims of Indianapolis – Doubles =

Doubles
- 1989 Virginia Slims of Indianapolis

Final
- Champions: (United States) Katrina Adams (United States) Lori McNeil
- Runners-up: (Germany) Claudia Porwik (Soviet Union) Larisa Savchenko
- Score: 6–4, 6–4

Details
- Draw: 16
- Seeds: 4

Events
Singles	Doubles
← 1988 ·	Virginia Slims of Indianapolis	· 1990 →

Larisa Savchenko and Natasha Zvereva were the defending champions, but Zvereva chose to compete at Worcester during the same week.

Savchenko teamed up with Claudia Porwik and lost in the final to Katrina Adams and Lori McNeil. The score was 6–4, 6–4.

== Seeds ==
1. (United States) Katrina Adams / (United States) Lori McNeil (champions)
2. (West Germany) Claudia Porwik / (Soviet Union) Larisa Savchenko (final)
3. (Netherlands) Manon Bollegraf / (Bulgaria) Katerina Maleeva (semifinals)
4. (Soviet Union) Natalia Medvedeva / (Soviet Union) Leila Meskhi (semifinals)

== Draw ==
=== Key ===
- Q = Qualifier
- WC = Wild card
- LL = Lucky loser
- Alt = Alternate
- SE = Special exempt
- PR = Protected ranking
- ITF = ITF entry
- JE = Junior exempt
- w/o = Walkover
- r = Retired
- d = Defaulted
- SR = Special ranking

=== Draw ===
First round
1	(United States) K Adams (United States) L McNeil	6	6
(Poland) R Baranski (Peru) P Vásquez	3	3
(South Africa) J Mundel (United States) G Purdy	6	4	0
(United States) S Foltz (Finland) P Thorén	4	6	6
3	(Netherlands) M Bollegraf (Bulgaria) K Maleeva	6	6
(France) S Amiach (Netherlands) H Witvoet	4	3
(United States) L Antonoplis (Brazil) G Miró	2	5
(United States) K Foxworth (United States) T Whittington	6	7
(United States) H Na (United States) R Reis	6	7	7
(United States) H Cioffi (United States) A Frazier	7	5	6
(United States) A Grousbeck (United States) M Norwood	2	3
4	(Soviet Union) N Medvedeva (Soviet Union) L Meskhi	6	6
(Sweden) C Lindqvist (Czechoslovakia) J Pospíšilová	4	3
(Sweden) M Lindström (United States) H Ludloff	6	6
(United States) D Faber (United States) J Thomas	1	6	6
2	(West Germany) C Porwik (Soviet Union) L Savchenko	6	3	7

Quarterfinals
1	(United States) K Adams (United States) L McNeil	6	6
(United States) S Foltz (Finland) P Thorén	3	2
3	(Netherlands) M Bollegraf (Bulgaria) K Maleeva	4	6	6
(United States) K Foxworth (United States) T Whittington	6	1	1
(United States) H Na (United States) R Reis	4	6	5
4	(Soviet Union) N Medvedeva (Soviet Union) L Meskhi	6	3	7
(Sweden) M Lindström (United States) H Ludloff	3	4
2	(West Germany) C Porwik (Soviet Union) L Savchenko	6	6

Semifinals
1	(United States) K Adams (United States) L McNeil	6	6	6
3	(Netherlands) M Bollegraf (Bulgaria) K Maleeva	7	2	3
4	(Soviet Union) N Medvedeva (Soviet Union) L Meskhi	6	6	4
2	(West Germany) C Porwik (Soviet Union) L Savchenko	7	2	6

Final
1	(United States) K Adams (United States) L McNeil	6	6
2	(West Germany) C Porwik (Soviet Union) L Savchenko	4	4
