= 1990 Jello Tennis Classic – Singles =

Singles
- 1990 Jello Tennis Classic

Final
- Champion: (Spain) Conchita Martínez
- Runner-up: (Soviet Union) Leila Meskhi
- Score: 6–4, 6–2

Details
- Draw: 32 (2WC/4Q/2LL)
- Seeds: 8

Events
Singles	Doubles
← 1989 ·	Virginia Slims of Indianapolis	· 1991 →

Katerina Maleeva was the defending champion, but lost in the semifinals to Leila Meskhi.

Conchita Martínez won the title by defeating Meskhi 6–4, 6–2 in the final.

== Seeds ==
1. (Bulgaria) Katerina Maleeva (semifinals)
2. (Spain) Conchita Martínez (champion)
3. (Austria) Barbara Paulus (second round)
4. (Soviet Union) Leila Meskhi (final)
5. (Italy) Raffaella Reggi (quarterfinals)
6. (West Germany) Claudia Porwik (quarterfinals)
7. (United States) Susan Sloane (quarterfinals)
8. (United States) Patty Fendick (second round)

== Draw ==
=== Key ===
- Q = Qualifier
- WC = Wild card
- LL = Lucky loser
- Alt = Alternate
- SE = Special exempt
- PR = Protected ranking
- ITF = ITF entry
- JE = Junior exempt
- w/o = Walkover
- r = Retired
- d = Defaulted
- SR = Special ranking

=== Finals ===
Semifinals
1	(Bulgaria) Katerina Maleeva	2	4
4	(Soviet Union) Leila Meskhi	6	6
(Soviet Union) Natalia Medvedeva	5	0
2	(Spain) Conchita Martínez	7	6

Final
4	(Soviet Union) Leila Meskhi	4	2
2	(Spain) Conchita Martínez	6	6

=== Top half ===
First round
1	(Bulgaria) K Maleeva	6	6
(Belgium) S Wasserman	2	1
(Bulgaria) E Pampoulova	3	7^{7}	6
(United States) H Cioffi	6	6^{2}	3
(United States) P Louie Harper	6	6
Q	(Finland) P Thorén	4	4
(Italy) L Ferrando	6^{4}	1
7	(United States) S Sloane	7^{7}	6
4	(Soviet Union) L Meskhi	6	6
WC	(South Africa) J Reinbold	1	2
Q	(United States) S Stafford	6	6
(United States) L Harvey Wild	1	2
(Mexico) A Gavaldón	7	6^{4}	6
LL	(United States) L Spadea	5	7^{7}	2
(United States) C Cunningham	4	2
5	(Italy) R Reggi	6	6

Second round
1	(Bulgaria) K Maleeva	6	6
(Bulgaria) E Pampoulova	1	2
(United States) P Louie Harper	4	2
7	(United States) S Sloane	6	6
4	(Soviet Union) L Meskhi	6	6
Q	(United States) S Stafford	2	1
(Mexico) A Gavaldón	6	2	5
5	(Italy) R Reggi	3	6	7

Quarterfinals
1	(Bulgaria) K Maleeva	6	7
7	(United States) S Sloane	3	5
4	(Soviet Union) L Meskhi	3	7	6
5	(Italy) R Reggi	6	5	3

Semifinals
1	(Bulgaria) K Maleeva	2	4
4	(Soviet Union) L Meskhi	6	6

=== Bottom half ===
First round
8	(United States) P Fendick	6	6
(United States) A Keller	3	1
(United States) S Martin	1	6	4
(Soviet Union) N Medvedeva	6	1	6
(United States) D Faber	4	6^{4}
(United States) M McGrath	6	7^{7}
Q	(United States) E Hakami	5	2
3	(Austria) B Paulus	7	6
6	(West Germany) C Porwik	6	6
WC	(United States) H Lord	0	4
Q	(United States) E deLone	2	7^{8}	2
(Australia) N Provis	6	6^{6}	6
(South Africa) E Reinach	6	1	6
(Sweden) C Dahlman	3	6	1
LL	(Argentina) B Fulco	1	2
2	(Spain) C Martínez	6	6

Second round
8	(United States) P Fendick	3	3
(Soviet Union) N Medvedeva	6	6
(United States) M McGrath	3	7^{8}	6
3	(Austria) B Paulus	6	6^{6}	2
6	(West Germany) C Porwik	6	6
(Australia) N Provis	1	4
(South Africa) E Reinach	1	7	2
2	(Spain) C Martínez	6	5	6

Quarterfinals
(Soviet Union) N Medvedeva	7^{8}	6
(United States) M McGrath	6^{6}	4
6	(West Germany) C Porwik	2	2
2	(Spain) C Martínez	6	6

Semifinals
(Soviet Union) N Medvedeva	5	0
2	(Spain) C Martínez	7	6
