= 1994 Danone Hardcourt Championships – Singles =

Singles
- 1994 Danone Hardcourt Championships
- 1993 Champion: (Spain) Conchita Martínez

Final
- Champion: (United States) Lindsay Davenport
- Runner-up: (Argentina) Florencia Labat
- Score: 6–1, 2–6, 6–3

Details
- Draw: 56
- Seeds: 16

Events
Singles	Doubles
← 1993 ·	Danone Hardcourt Championships

Conchita Martínez was the defending champion but did not compete that year.

Lindsay Davenport won in the final 6–1, 2–6, 6–3 against Florencia Labat.

== Seeds ==
A champion seed is indicated in bold text while text in italics indicates the round in which that seed was eliminated. The top eight seeds received a bye to the second round.

1. (Bulgaria) Magdalena Maleeva (semifinals)
2. (United States) **Lindsay Davenport (champion)**
3. (Ukraine) Natalia Medvedeva (quarterfinals)
4. (Germany) Sabine Hack (third round)
5. (France) Julie Halard (second round)
6. (Chinese Taipei) Shi-Ting Wang (semifinals)
7. (Netherlands) Stephanie Rottier (second round)
8. (Germany) Barbara Rittner (quarterfinals)
9. (United States) Ann Grossman (third round)
10. (Belgium) Sabine Appelmans (first round)
11. (Argentina) Florencia Labat (final)
12. (Italy) Linda Ferrando (third round)
13. (Romania) Irina Spîrlea (third round)
14. (Mexico) Angélica Gavaldón (second round)
15. (Russia) Elena Likhovtseva (first round)
16. (Italy) Laura Golarsa (first round)

== Draw ==
=== Key ===
- Q = Qualifier
- WC = Wild card
- LL = Lucky loser
- Alt = Alternate
- SE = Special exempt
- PR = Protected ranking
- ITF = ITF entry
- JE = Junior exempt
- w/o = Walkover
- r = Retired
- d = Defaulted
- SR = Special ranking

=== Finals ===
Semifinals
1	(Bulgaria) Magdalena Maleeva
11	(Argentina) **Florencia Labat**	**w/o**
6	(Chinese Taipei) Shi-Ting Wang	2	4
2	(United States) **Lindsay Davenport**	**6**	**6**

Final
11	(Argentina) Florencia Labat	1	**6**	3
2	(United States) **Lindsay Davenport**	**6**	2	**6**

=== Top half ===
==== Section 1 ====
First round
(United States) **A Keller**	**7**	**6**
(Austria) P Ritter	5	1
Q	(Italy) **R Grande**	**7**	**6**
(France) K Quentrec	5	3
(Italy) **N Baudone**	**7**	**6**
10	(Belgium) S Appelmans	5	3
16	(Italy) L Golarsa	**6**	3	0
(Australia) **K Radford**	4	**6**	**6**
(China) **F Li**	**7**	**7**
(Switzerland) E Zardo	6	6
WC	(Australia) N Pratt	1	3
(Australia) **R McQuillan**	**6**	**6**

Second round
1	(Bulgaria) **M Maleeva**	**6**	**6**
(United States) A Keller	4	3
Q	(Italy) R Grande	4	**7**	4
(Italy) **N Baudone**	**6**	5	**6**
(Australia) K Radford	3	5
(China) **F Li**	**6**	**7**
(Australia) **R McQuillan**	**6**	**6**
5	(France) J Halard	3	2

Third round
1	(Bulgaria) **M Maleeva**	**6**	**6**
(Italy) N Baudone	0	2
(China) F Li	4	3
(Australia) **R McQuillan**	**6**	**6**

Quarterfinals
1	(Bulgaria) **M Maleeva**	**6**	**7**
(Australia) R McQuillan	2	5

==== Section 2 ====
First round
(South Africa) T Price	2	**6**	5
(Italy) **S Farina**	**6**	4	**7**
(Australia) **M Jaggard-Lai**	**6**	**6**
(United States) J Watanabe	4	0
(Germany) K Kschwendt	4	2
14	(Mexico) **A Gavaldón**	**6**	**6**
11	(Argentina) **F Labat**	**6**	**6**
(Paraguay) R de los Ríos	2	1
Q	(Argentina) M Paz	2	4
WC	(Australia) **R Stubbs**	**6**	**6**
Q	(Japan) M Miyauchi	2	3
(Japan) **R Hiraki**	**6**	**6**

Second round
4	(Germany) **S Hack**	**6**	**6**
(Italy) S Farina	3	2
(Australia) **M Jaggard-Lai**	**6**	**7**
14	(Mexico) A Gavaldón	2	6
11	(Argentina) **F Labat**	**6**	**6**
WC	(Australia) R Stubbs	3	3
(Japan) **R Hiraki**	1	**6**	**0**
7	(Netherlands) S Rottier	**6**	4	1/r

Third round
4	(Germany) S Hack	6	0
(Australia) **M Jaggard-Lai**	**7**	**6**
11	(Argentina) **F Labat**	**6**	**6**
(Japan) R Hiraki	3	2

Quarterfinals
(Australia) M Jaggard-Lai	6	4
11	(Argentina) **F Labat**	**7**	**6**

=== Bottom half ===
==== Section 3 ====
First round
(United States) **S Stafford**	**6**	**6**
Q	(Netherlands) C Vis	2	3
(Germany) **P Begerow**	2	**7**	**6**
WC	(Australia) L McShea	**6**	6	2
(United States) C Kuhlman	**6**	3	2
12	(Italy) **L Ferrando**	4	**6**	**6**
13	(Romania) **I Spîrlea**	**6**	**6**
(Romania) C Cristea	4	1
(France) **N van Lottum**	5	**6**	**6**
Q	(Czech Republic) A Strnadová	**7**	2	3
(Belgium) **S Wasserman**	3	**7**	**3**
(Austria) B Schett	**6**	5	0/r

Second round
6	(Chinese Taipei) **S-T Wang**	**7**	5	**7**
(United States) S Stafford	5	**7**	5
(Germany) P Begerow	**6**	3	3
12	(Italy) **L Ferrando**	4	**6**	**6**
13	(Romania) **I Spîrlea**	**6**	**6**
(France) N van Lottum	1	1
(Belgium) S Wasserman	4	4
3	(Ukraine) **N Medvedeva**	**6**	**6**

Third round
6	(Chinese Taipei) **S-T Wang**	**7**	**6**
12	(Italy) L Ferrando	6	2
13	(Romania) I Spîrlea	3	6
3	(Ukraine) **N Medvedeva**	**6**	**7**

Quarterfinals
6	(Chinese Taipei) **S-T Wang**	**6**	3	**6**
3	(Ukraine) N Medvedeva	1	**6**	2

==== Section 4 ====
First round
(United States) N Arendt	4	3
Q	(Australia) **J Limmer**	**6**	**6**
Q	(Australia) J Taylor	5	1
(Canada) **R Simpson-Alter**	**7**	**6**
(France) **S Testud**	**6**	**6**
15	(Russia) E Likhovtseva	4	2
9	(United States) **A Grossman**	**6**	**7**
(Italy) M Grossi	4	6
(Slovakia) **R Zrubáková**	**6**	**6**
Q	(Australia) J Byrne	4	4
(Romania) R Dragomir	4	**6**	4
LL	(France) **L Ghirardi**	**6**	2	**6**

Second round
8	(Germany) **B Rittner**	**6**	**6**
Q	(Australia) J Limmer	1	4
(Canada) **R Simpson-Alter**	3	**6**	**6**
(France) S Testud	**6**	3	2
9	(United States) **A Grossman**	**6**	**6**
(Slovakia) R Zrubáková	2	2
LL	(France) L Ghirardi	0	3
2	(United States) **L Davenport**	**6**	**6**

Third round
8	(Germany) **B Rittner**	**6**	5	**6**
(Canada) R Simpson-Alter	3	**7**	2
9	(United States) A Grossman	0	2
2	(United States) **L Davenport**	**6**	**6**

Quarterfinals
8	(Germany) B Rittner	4	0
2	(United States) **L Davenport**	**6**	**6**
