= 1994 Danone Hardcourt Championships =

- Date: 3–9 January
- Edition: 12th
- Category: Tier III
- Draw: 56S / 28D
- Prize money: $150,000
- Surface: Hard / outdoor
- Location: Brisbane, Australia
- Venue: Milton Tennis Centre

Champions

Singles
- (United States) Lindsay Davenport

Doubles
- (Italy) Laura Golarsa / (Ukraine) Natalia Medvedeva
- Danone Hardcourt Championships

The 1994 Danone Hardcourt Championships was a women's tennis tournament played on outdoor hard courts at the Milton Tennis Centre in Brisbane, Australia that was part of Tier III of the 1994 WTA Tour. The tournament was held from 3 through 9 January 1994. Second-seeded Lindsay Davenport won the singles title and earned $27,000 first-prize money.

== Finals ==
=== Singles ===
(United States) Lindsay Davenport defeated (Argentina) Florencia Labat 6–1, 2–6, 6–3

- It was Davenport's 1st title of the year and the 2nd of her career.

=== Doubles ===
(Italy) Laura Golarsa / (Ukraine) Natalia Medvedeva defeated (Australia) Jenny Byrne / (Australia) Rachel McQuillan 6–3, 6–1

- It was Golarsa's only title of the year and the 4th of her career. It was Medvedeva's only title of the year and the 14th of her career.
