= 1987 Virginia Slims of Indianapolis – Doubles =

Doubles
- 1987 Virginia Slims of Indianapolis

Final
- Champions: (Australia) Jenny Byrne (Australia) Michelle Jaggard
- Runners-up: (United States) Beverly Bowes (United States) Hu Na
- Score: 6–2, 6–3

Details
- Draw: 24
- Seeds: 6

Events
Singles	Doubles
← 1986 ·	Virginia Slims of Indianapolis	· 1988 →

Zina Garrison and Lori McNeil were the defending champions, but none competed this year.

Jenny Byrne and Michelle Jaggard won the title by defeating Beverly Bowes and Hu Na 6–2, 6–3 in the final.

== Seeds ==
All seeds received a bye into the second round.

1. (United States) Peanut Louie Harper / (United States) Heather Ludloff (semifinals)
2. (United States) Gretchen Magers / (United States) Candy Reynolds (second round)
3. (n/a)
4. (United States) Lea Antonoplis / (United States) Barbara Gerken (second round)
5. (United States) Anna-Maria Fernandez / (Australia) Louise Field (second round)
6. (Canada) Helen Kelesi / (United States) Alycia Moulton (second round)
7. (n/a)
8. (United States) Elly Hakami / (United States) Terry Phelps (quarterfinals)

== Draw ==
=== Key ===
- Q = Qualifier
- WC = Wild card
- LL = Lucky loser
- Alt = Alternate
- SE = Special exempt
- PR = Protected ranking
- ITF = ITF entry
- JE = Junior exempt
- w/o = Walkover
- r = Retired
- d = Defaulted
- SR = Special ranking

=== Finals ===
Semifinals
1	(United States) Peanut Louie Harper (United States) Heather Ludloff	1	2
(United States) Beverly Bowes (United States) Hu Na	6	6
(Australia) Jenny Byrne (Australia) Michelle Jaggard	6	6
(United States) Louise Allen (United States) Anne Smith	1	2

Final
(United States) Beverly Bowes (United States) Hu Na	2	3
(Australia) Jenny Byrne (Australia) Michelle Jaggard	6	6

=== Top half ===
First round
(United States) J Kaplan (Sweden) M Lindström	7	6	6
(Soviet Union) N Egorova (Italy) L Golarsa	6	7	3
(Czechoslovakia) A Holíková (United States) M Torres	6	4	6
(United States) C MacGregor (Australia) E Minter	2	6	2
(United States) B Bowes (United States) H Na	6	6
(United States) K Adams (United States) V Nelson-Dunbar	1	3
(Hong Kong) P Hy (United States) J Thomas	1	6	4
(Brazil) C Monteiro (South Africa) J Mundel	6	2	6

Second round
1	(United States) PL Harper (United States) H Ludloff	6	7
(United States) J Kaplan (Sweden) M Lindström	2	6
(Czechoslovakia) A Holíková (United States) M Torres	6	6
6	(Canada) H Kelesi (United States) A Moulton	2	1
4	(United States) L Antonoplis (United States) B Gerken	6	0
(United States) B Bowes (United States) H Na	7	6
(Brazil) C Monteiro (South Africa) J Mundel	3	6
8	(United States) E Hakami (United States) T Phelps	6	7

Quarterfinals
1	(United States) PL Harper (United States) H Ludloff	7	6
(Czechoslovakia) A Holíková (United States) M Torres	6	1
(United States) B Bowes (United States) H Na	6	7
8	(United States) E Hakami (United States) T Phelps	2	5

Semifinals
1	(United States) PL Harper (United States) H Ludloff	1	2
(United States) B Bowes (United States) H Na	6	6

=== Bottom half ===
First round
(Netherlands) M Bollegraf (Netherlands) M van der Torre	6	3
(Australia) J Byrne (Australia) M Jaggard	7	6
(United States) P Casale (United States) S Mascarin	0	2
(Soviet Union) L Meskhi (Soviet Union) N Zvereva	6	6
(United States) Gretchen Doninger (United States) S Reece	1	2
(United States) P Barg (Canada) J Hetherington	6	6
(United States) M Gurney (United States) S Sloane	6	1	2
(United States) L Allen (United States) A Smith	3	6	6

Second round
5	(United States) AM Fernandez (Australia) L Field	5	1
(Australia) J Byrne (Australia) M Jaggard	7	6
(Soviet Union) L Meskhi (Soviet Union) N Zvereva	7	6
(Netherlands) B Schultz (Netherlands) H ter Riet	6	1
(United States) H Cioffi (United States) K Gompert	3	6	5
(United States) P Barg (Canada) J Hetherington	6	3	7
(United States) L Allen (United States) A Smith	6	6
2	(United States) G Magers (United States) C Reynolds	3	4

Quarterfinals
(Australia) J Byrne (Australia) M Jaggard	6	6
(Soviet Union) L Meskhi (Soviet Union) N Zvereva	4	2
(United States) P Barg (Canada) J Hetherington	4	6	3
(United States) L Allen (United States) A Smith	6	4	6

Semifinals
(Australia) J Byrne (Australia) M Jaggard	6	6
(United States) L Allen (United States) A Smith	1	2
