= 1988 Virginia Slims of Indianapolis =

Tennis tournament

- Date: October 24–30
- Edition: 9th
- Category: Category 2
- Draw: 32S / 16D
- Prize money: $100,000
- Surface: Hard / outdoor
- Location: Indianapolis, Indiana, U.S.

Champions

Singles
- (Bulgaria) Katerina Maleeva

Doubles
- (Soviet Union) Larisa Savchenko (Soviet Union) Natasha Zvereva
← 1987 ·	Virginia Slims of Indianapolis	· 1989 →

The 1988 Virginia Slims of Indianapolis was a women's tennis tournament played on outdoor hard courts in Indianapolis, Indiana in the United States and was part of the Category 2 tier of the 1988 WTA Tour. It was the ninth edition of the tournament and ran from October 24 through October 30, 1988. Second-seeded Katerina Maleeva won the singles title and earned $17,000 first-prize money.

== Finals ==
=== Singles ===
(Bulgaria) Katerina Maleeva defeated (United States) Zina Garrison 6–3, 2–6, 6–2

- It was Maleeva's only title of the year and the 6th of her career.

=== Doubles ===
(Soviet Union) Larisa Savchenko / (Soviet Union) Natasha Zvereva defeated (United States) Katrina Adams / (United States) Zina Garrison 6–2, 6–1

- It was Savchenko's 2nd title of the year and the 10th of her career. It was Zvereva's 2nd title of the year and the 2nd of her career.
