= 1994 Danone Hardcourt Championships – Doubles =

Doubles
- 1994 Danone Hardcourt Championships
- 1993 Champions: (Spain) Conchita Martínez; (Latvia) Larisa Savchenko

Final
- Champions: (Italy) Laura Golarsa; (Ukraine) Natalia Medvedeva
- Runners-up: (Australia) Jenny Byrne; (Australia) Rachel McQuillan
- Score: 6–3, 6–1

Details
- Draw: 28
- Seeds: 8

Events
Singles	Doubles
← 1993 ·	Danone Hardcourt Championships

Conchita Martínez and Larisa Savchenko were the defending champions but did not compete that year.

Laura Golarsa and Natalia Medvedeva won in the final 6–3, 6–1 against Jenny Byrne and Rachel McQuillan.

== Seeds ==
Champion seeds are indicated in bold text while text in italics indicates the round in which those seeds were eliminated. The top four seeded teams received byes into the second round.

1. (United States) Ann Grossman / (New Zealand) Julie Richardson (second round)
2. (Canada) Jill Hetherington / (United States) Shaun Stafford (second round)
3. (United States) Lindsay Davenport / (Czech Republic) Andrea Strnadová (second round)
4. (Italy) **Laura Golarsa** / (Ukraine) **Natalia Medvedeva (champions)**
5. (Germany) Karin Kschwendt / (Argentina) Florencia Labat (second round)
6. (Italy) Silvia Farina / (Italy) Linda Ferrando (first round)
7. (Australia) Jo-Anne Faull / (United States) Robin White (first round)
8. (Japan) Rika Hiraki / (Argentina) Mercedes Paz (quarterfinals)

== Draw ==
=== Key ===
- Q = Qualifier
- WC = Wild card
- LL = Lucky loser
- Alt = Alternate
- SE = Special exempt
- PR = Protected ranking
- ITF = ITF entry
- JE = Junior exempt
- w/o = Walkover
- r = Retired
- d = Defaulted
- SR = Special ranking

=== Final ===
Final

- (Australia) Jenny Byrne
- (Australia) Rachel McQuillan
3
1

4
- (Italy) **Laura Golarsa**
- (Ukraine) **Natalia Medvedeva**
**6**
**6**

=== Top half ===
First round

Second round

Quarterfinals

Semifinals

1
- (United States) A Grossman
- (New Zealand) J Richardson
4
2

- (France) **J Halard**
- (Slovakia) **R Zrubáková**
**6**
**6**

- (France) **J Halard**
- (Slovakia) **R Zrubáková**
**6**
**6**

- (United Kingdom) V Lake
- (United Kingdom) C Wood
3
4

- (France) J Halard
- (Slovakia) R Zrubáková
3
**7**
3

- (United States) N Arendt
- (Australia) K Radford
3
5

- (Austria) **P Ritter**
- (France) **N van Lottum**
**6**
5
**6**

- (Austria) **P Ritter**
- (France) **N van Lottum**
**6**
**7**

- (Austria) **P Ritter**
- (France) **N van Lottum**
3
**6**
**7**

- (Australia) D Jones
- (United States) C Kuhlman
4
5

5
- (Germany) K Kschwendt
- (Argentina) F Labat
**6**
4
5

5
- (Germany) **K Kschwendt**
- (Argentina) **F Labat**
**6**
**7**

- (Austria) P Ritter
- (France) N van Lottum
4
**6**
5

- (Australia) **J Byrne**
- (Australia) **R McQuillan**
**6**
4
**7**

3
- (United States) L Davenport
- (Czech Republic) A Strnadová
4
1

- (Australia) **M Jaggard-Lai**
- (Canada) **R Simpson-Alter**
**7**
6
**6**

- (Australia) **M Jaggard-Lai**
- (Canada) **R Simpson-Alter**
**6**
**6**

Q
- (China) F Li
- (Chinese Taipei) S-T Wang
5
**7**
3

- (Australia) M Jaggard-Lai
- (Canada) R Simpson-Alter
3
**6**
2

- (Finland) **N Dahlman**
- (Australia) **K Sharpe**
**6**
**6**

- (Australia) **J Byrne**
- (Australia) **R McQuillan**
**6**
3
**6**

- (United States) E Hakami
- (United States) S Reece
2
2

- (Finland) N Dahlman
- (Australia) K Sharpe
4
1

- (Australia) **J Byrne**
- (Australia) **R McQuillan**
**6**
**6**

- (Australia) **J Byrne**
- (Australia) **R McQuillan**
**6**
**6**

7
- (Australia) J-A Faull
- (United States) R White
4
2

=== Bottom half ===
First round

Second round

Quarterfinals

Semifinals

6
- (Italy) S Farina
- (Italy) L Ferrando
4
3

- (Romania) **R Dragomir**
- (Romania) **I Spîrlea**
**6**
**6**

- (Romania) R Dragomir
- (Romania) I Spîrlea
3
4

- (Romania) C Cristea
- (Australia) L Field
3
2

- (United States) **E deLone**
- (United States) **A Keller**
**6**
**6**

- (United States) **E deLone**
- (United States) **A Keller**
**6**
**6**

- (United States) E deLone
- (United States) A Keller
4
1

- (Russia) **E Likhovtseva**
- (Finland) **P Thorén**
**7**
5
**6**

4
- (Italy) **L Golarsa**
- (Ukraine) **N Medvedeva**
**6**
**6**

WC
- (Australia) K McDonald
- (Australia) N Pratt
6
**7**
3

- (Russia) E Likhovtseva
- (Finland) P Thorén
4
1

4
- (Italy) **L Golarsa**
- (Ukraine) **N Medvedeva**
**6**
**6**

4
- (Italy) **L Golarsa**
- (Ukraine) **N Medvedeva**
1
**7**
**6**

8
- (Japan) **R Hiraki**
- (Argentina) **M Paz**
**7**
**6**

- (Australia) C Barclay
- (Australia) K-A Guse
**6**
5
4

- (Japan) A Kijimuta
- (Japan) N Kijimuta
6
1

8
- (Japan) **R Hiraki**
- (Argentina) **M Paz**
**6**
**6**

- (Australia) **L Pleming**
- (South Africa) **T Price**
**6**
1
**6**

- (Australia) L Pleming
- (South Africa) T Price
1
1

- (Belgium) S Appelmans
- (Germany) B Rittner
4
**6**
2

8
- (Japan) R Hiraki
- (Argentina) M Paz
1
**6**
1

WC
- (United States) T Austin
- (United States) S McCarthy
1
3

- (Australia) **C Barclay**
- (Australia) **K-A Guse**
**6**
4
**6**

- (Australia) **C Barclay**
- (Australia) **K-A Guse**
**6**
**6**

- (Australia) **C Barclay**
- (Australia) **K-A Guse**
**6**
**6**

2
- (Canada) J Hetherington
- (United States) S Stafford
2
2
