= 1995 Schweppes Tasmanian International – Singles =

Singles
- 1995 Schweppes Tasmanian International

Final
- Champion: (Georgia (country)) Leila Meskhi
- Runner-up: (China) Fang Li
- Score: 6–2, 6–3

Details
- Draw: 32
- Seeds: 8

Events
Singles	Doubles
← 1994 ·	Hobart International	· 1996 →

Mana Endo was the defending champion but did not compete that year.

Leila Meskhi won in the final 6–2, 6–3 against Fang Li.

== Seeds ==
A champion seed is indicated in bold text while text in italics indicates the round in which that seed was eliminated.

1. n/a
2. (United States) Chanda Rubin (second round)
3. (Austria) Judith Wiesner (semifinals)
4. (United States) Ginger Helgeson-Nielsen (first round)
5. (Georgia (country)) **Leila Meskhi (champion)**
6. (Latvia) Larisa Neiland (first round)
7. (Romania) Irina Spîrlea (first round)
8. (United States) Lisa Raymond (second round)

== Draw ==
=== Key ===
- Q = Qualifier
- WC = Wild card
- LL = Lucky loser
- Alt = Alternate
- SE = Special exempt
- PR = Protected ranking
- ITF = ITF entry
- JE = Junior exempt
- w/o = Walkover
- r = Retired
- d = Defaulted
- SR = Special ranking

First round
LL	(Venezuela) M Vento	3	6
(United States) **N Arendt**	**6**	**7**
(China) **F Li**	**6**	**6**
(France) A D-Balleret	2	3
Q	(United States) **J Watanabe**	**6**	**6**
(Austria) P Schwarz	1	0
(Japan) **K Nagatsuka**	**6**	**6**
7	(Romania) I Spîrlea	3	1
3	(Austria) **J Wiesner**	**6**	**6**
(Germany) C Singer	3	3
Q	(United States) A Miller	4	2
(Canada) **P Hy-Boulais**	**6**	**6**
(Netherlands) **K Boogert**	**6**	**6**
(United States) L Harvey-Wild	2	3
(Germany) **M Babel**	**7**	**6**
6	(Latvia) L Neiland	6	1
8	(United States) **L Raymond**	4	**7**	**6**
WC	(Australia) S Drake-Brockman	**6**	5	4
(Italy) S Farina	6	2
(United States) **T Whitlinger-Jones**	**7**	**6**
(Australia) R McQuillan	3	3
Q	(Japan) **Y Kamio**	**6**	**6**
WC	(Australia) **A Ellwood**	1	**6**	**6**
4	(United States) G Helgeson-Nielsen	**6**	4	1
5	(Georgia (country)) **L Meskhi**	4	**7**	**7**
(United States) S Cacic	**6**	5	5
(Russia) **E Makarova**	**6**	**6**
(Japan) A Sugiyama	4	1
(Sweden) Å Carlsson	**6**	4	1
(Russia) **E Likhovtseva**	2	**6**	**6**
Q	(United States) A Keller	6	2
2	(United States) **C Rubin**	**7**	**6**

Second round
(United States) N Arendt	3	0
(China) **F Li**	**6**	**6**
Q	(United States) **J Watanabe**	1	**6**	**7**
(Japan) K Nagatsuka	**6**	3	5
3	(Austria) **J Wiesner**	**6**	**6**
(Canada) P Hy-Boulais	0	2
(Netherlands) K Boogert	3	5
(Germany) **M Babel**	**6**	**7**
8	(United States) L Raymond	2	5
(United States) **T Whitlinger-Jones**	**6**	**7**
Q	(Japan) **Y Kamio**	**6**	**7**
WC	(Australia) A Ellwood	4	6
5	(Georgia (country)) **L Meskhi**	**6**	**7**
(Russia) E Makarova	1	6
(Russia) **E Likhovtseva**	**w/o**
2	(United States) C Rubin

Quarterfinals
(China) **F Li**	**7**	**6**
Q	(United States) J Watanabe	5	0
3	(Austria) **J Wiesner**	**6**	**6**
(Germany) M Babel	4	3
(United States) T Whitlinger-Jones	2	**6**	3
Q	(Japan) **Y Kamio**	**6**	1	**6**
5	(Georgia (country)) **L Meskhi**	**6**	6	**6**
(Russia) E Likhovtseva	2	**7**	4

Semifinals
(China) **F Li**	**6**	1	**6**
3	(Austria) J Wiesner	4	**6**	3
Q	(Japan) Y Kamio	2	3
5	(Georgia (country)) **L Meskhi**	**6**	**6**

Final
(China) Fang Li	2	3
5	(Georgia (country)) **Leila Meskhi**	**6**	**6**
