= 1994 Tasmanian International =

- Date: 10–15 January
- Edition: 1st
- Category: Tier IV
- Draw: 32S / 16D
- Prize money: $100,000
- Surface: Hard / outdoor
- Location: Hobart, Australia
- Venue: Domain Tennis Centre

Champions

Singles
- (Japan) Mana Endo

Doubles
- (United States) Linda Harvey-Wild / (United States) Chanda Rubin
| Hobart International | · 1995 → |

The 1994 Tasmanian International was a women's tennis tournament played on outdoor hard courts at the Domain Tennis Centre in Hobart in Australia that was part of Tier IV of the 1994 WTA Tour. It was the inaugural edition of the tournament and was held from 10 January through 15 January 1994. Sixth-seeded Mana Endo won the singles title and earned $18,000 first-prize money.

== Finals ==
=== Singles ===
(Japan) Mana Endo defeated (Australia) Rachel McQuillan 6–1, 6–7^{(1–7)}, 6–4

- It was Endo's only WTA singles title of her career.

=== Doubles ===
(United States) Linda Harvey-Wild / (United States) Chanda Rubin defeated (Australia) Jenny Byrne / (Australia) Rachel McQuillan 7–5, 4–6, 7–6^{(7–1)}

- It was Harvey-Wild's 1st title of the year and the 3rd of her career. It was Rubin's only title of the year and the 2nd of her career.
