= 1989 Virginia Slims of Indianapolis =

- Date: October 30 – November 5
- Edition: 10th
- Category: Category 2
- Draw: 32S / 16D
- Prize money: $100,000
- Surface: Hard / outdoor
- Location: Indianapolis, Indiana, U.S.

Champions

Singles
- (Bulgaria) Katerina Maleeva

Doubles
- (United States) Katrina Adams / (United States) Lori McNeil
← 1988 ·	Virginia Slims of Indianapolis	· 1990 →

The 1989 Virginia Slims of Indianapolis was a women's tennis tournament played on outdoor hard courts in Indianapolis, Indiana in the United States and was part of the Category 2 tier of the 1989 WTA Tour. It was the 10th edition of the tournament and ran from October 30 through November 5, 1989. First-seeded Katerina Maleeva won her second consecutive singles title at the event.

== Finals ==
=== Singles ===
(Bulgaria) Katerina Maleeva defeated (Italy) Raffaella Reggi 6–4, 6–4

- It was Maleeva's only title of the year and the 6th of her career.

=== Doubles ===
(United States) Katrina Adams / (United States) Lori McNeil defeated (West Germany) Claudia Porwik / (Soviet Union) Larisa Savchenko 6–4, 6–4
