= 1990 Jello Tennis Classic =

- Date: November 5–11
- Edition: 11th
- Category: Tier IV
- Draw: 32S / 16D
- Prize money: $150,000
- Surface: Hard / intdoor
- Location: Indianapolis, Indiana, U.S.

Champions

Singles
- (Spain) Conchita Martínez

Doubles
- (United States) Patty Fendick / (United States) Meredith McGrath
← 1989 ·	Virginia Slims of Indianapolis	· 1991 →

The 1990 Jello Tennis Classic was a women's tennis tournament played on indoor hard courts in Indianapolis, Indiana in the United States and was part of the Tier IV category of the 1990 WTA Tour. It was the 11th edition of the tournament and ran from November 5 through November 11, 1990. Second-seeded Conchita Martínez won the singles title and earned $27,000 first-prize money.

== Finals ==
=== Singles ===
(Spain) Conchita Martínez defeated (Soviet Union) Leila Meskhi 6–4, 6–2

- It was Martínez' 3rd singles title of the year and the 7th of her career.

=== Doubles ===
(United States) Patty Fendick / (United States) Meredith McGrath defeated (United States) Katrina Adams / (Canada) Jill Hetherington 6–1, 6–1
