= 1994 Tasmanian International – Doubles =

Doubles
- 1994 Tasmanian International

Final
- Champions: (United States) Linda Harvey-Wild; (United States) Chanda Rubin
- Runners-up: (Australia) Jenny Byrne; (Australia) Rachel McQuillan
- Score: 7–5, 4–6, 7–6^{(7–1)}

Details
- Draw: 16
- Seeds: 4

Events
| Singles | Doubles |
| Hobart International | · 1995 → |

The 1994 Tasmanian International featured a doubles competition which was contested by 16 teams including a team that qualified from the qualifying match earlier in that week. In the final of the first double competition, American pair, Linda Harvey-Wild and Chanda Rubin defeated Australian pair Jenny Byrne and Rachel McQuillan 7–5, 4–6, 7–6^{(7–1)} to record their third and second career doubles title respectively.

== Seeds ==
Champion seeds are indicated in bold text while text in italics indicates the round in which those seeds were eliminated.

1. (Argentina) Inés Gorrochategui / (Latvia) Larisa Neiland (semifinals)
2. (United States) Debbie Graham / (United States) Ann Grossman (first round)
3. (Italy) Laura Golarsa / (Argentina) Patricia Tarabini (quarterfinals)
4. (United States) **Linda Harvey-Wild** / (United States) **Chanda Rubin (champions)**

== Draw ==
=== Key ===
- Q = Qualifier
- WC = Wild card
- LL = Lucky loser
- Alt = Alternate
- SE = Special exempt
- PR = Protected ranking
- ITF = ITF entry
- JE = Junior exempt
- w/o = Walkover
- r = Retired
- d = Defaulted
- SR = Special ranking

First round

Quarterfinals

Semifinals

Final

1
- (Argentina) **I Gorrochategui**
- (Latvia) **L Neiland**
**6**
**7**

- (Argentina) M-J Gaidano
- (China) F Li
1
5

1
- (Argentina) **I Gorrochategui**
- (Latvia) **L Neiland**
3
**6**
**6**

WC
- (Australia) J Hodder
- (Australia) A Woolcock
1
4

- (Netherlands) K Boogert
- (Netherlands) N Muns-Jagerman
**6**
4
1

- (Netherlands) **K Boogert**
- (Netherlands) **N Muns-Jagerman**
**6**
**6**

1
- (Argentina) I Gorrochategui
- (Latvia) L Neiland
3
5

3
- (Italy) **L Golarsa**
- (Argentina) **P Tarabini**
**6**
**7^{7}**

- (Australia) **J Byrne**
- (Australia) **R McQuillan**
**6**
**7**

- (Canada) M Drake
- (United States) C Kuhlman
3
6^{1}

3
- (Italy) L Golarsa
- (Argentina) P Tarabini
4
3

- (Australia) **J Byrne**
- (Australia) **R McQuillan**
3
**6**
**6**

- (Australia) **J Byrne**
- (Australia) **R McQuillan**
**6**
**6**

- (United States) E Hakami
- (United States) S Reece
**6**
2
3

- (Australia) Jenny Byrne
- (Australia) Rachel McQuillan
5
**6**
6^{1}

- (Romania) **R Dragomir**
- (Romania) **I Spîrlea**
**7**
**7**

4
- (United States) **Linda Harvey-Wild**
- (United States) **Chanda Rubin**
**7**
4
**7^{7}**

- (Slovakia) J Husárová
- (Russia) E Likhovtseva
5
5

- (Romania) R Dragomir
- (Romania) I Spîrlea
3
2

Q
- (Austria) N Murn
- (France) A Olivier
4
1

4
- (United States) **L Harvey-Wild**
- (United States) **C Rubin**
**6**
**6**

4
- (United States) **L Harvey-Wild**
- (United States) **C Rubin**
**6**
**6**

4
- (United States) **L Harvey-Wild**
- (United States) **C Rubin**
**6**
3
**6**

- (Austria) **S Dopfer**
- (Austria) **P Ritter**
4
**7**
**6**

- (Italy) S Farina
- (United States) G Helgeson
4
**6**
3

- (United States) A Keller
- (Australia) N Pratt
**6**
5
2

- (Austria) S Dopfer
- (Austria) P Ritter
2
**6**
2

- (Italy) **S Farina**
- (United States) **G Helgeson**
**7**
**6**

- (Italy) **S Farina**
- (United States) **G Helgeson**
**6**
3
**6**

2
- (United States) D Graham
- (United States) A Grossman
5
0
