= 1994 Tasmanian International – Singles =

Singles
- 1994 Tasmanian International

Final
- Champion: (Japan) Mana Endo
- Runner-up: (Australia) Rachel McQuillan
- Score: 6–1, 6–7, 6–4

Details
- Draw: 32
- Seeds: 8

Events
Singles	Doubles
Hobart International	· 1995 →

This was the first edition played.

Mana Endo won in the final 6–1, 6–7, 6–4 against Rachel McQuillan.

== Seeds ==
A champion seed is indicated in bold text while text in italics indicates the round in which that seed was eliminated.

1. (Chinese Taipei) Shi-Ting Wang (second round)
2. (Latvia) Larisa Neiland (first round)
3. (United States) Ann Grossman (second round)
4. (Canada) Patricia Hy (second round)
5. (United States) Linda Harvey-Wild (first round)
6. (Japan) **Mana Endo (champion)**
7. (United States) Ginger Helgeson (quarterfinals)
8. (Argentina) Inés Gorrochategui (first round)

== Draw ==
=== Key ===
- Q = Qualifier
- WC = Wild card
- LL = Lucky loser
- Alt = Alternate
- SE = Special exempt
- PR = Protected ranking
- ITF = ITF entry
- JE = Junior exempt
- w/o = Walkover
- r = Retired
- d = Defaulted
- SR = Special ranking

First round
1	(Chinese Taipei) **S-T Wang**	3	**6**	**6**
(Russia) E Likhovtseva	**6**	4	2
(United States) C Kuhlman	**6**	5	2
(Italy) **S Farina**	3	**7**	**6**
Q	(Japan) Y Kamio	3	5
(United States) **C Rubin**	**6**	**7**
(Romania) **R Dragomir**	**6**	2	**6**
5	(United States) L Harvey-Wild	3	**6**	3
4	(Canada) **P Hy**	**6**	**7**
(United States) T Whitlinger	1	5
WC	(Australia) **R McQuillan**	4	**6**	**6**
LL	(Romania) C Cristea	**6**	3	4
(Switzerland) **E Zardo**	**6**	**6**
(South Africa) T Price	4	2
(Argentina) M-J Gaidano	3	5
7	(United States) **G Helgeson**	**6**	**7**
6	(Japan) **M Endo**	**6**	**7**
(United States) D Graham	1	6
Q	(China) F Li	4	**6**	2
Q	(Italy) **R Grande**	**6**	3	**6**
(Germany) K Kschwendt	**6**	2	4
(Austria) **B Reinstadler**	4	**6**	**6**
WC	(United States) T Austin	4	4
3	(United States) **A Grossman**	**6**	**6**
8	(Argentina) I Gorrochategui	4	5
(Netherlands) **N Muns-Jagerman**	**6**	**7**
Q	(Netherlands) **K Boogert**	**7**	**6**
(Mexico) A Gavaldón	6	4
(Romania) **I Spîrlea**	4	**6**	**6**
(Slovakia) J Husárová	**6**	4	0
(Italy) **L Golarsa**	2	**7**	**6**
2	(Latvia) L Neiland	**6**	6	2

Second round
1	(Chinese Taipei) S-T Wang	6	4
(Italy) **S Farina**	**7**	**6**
(United States) **C Rubin**	**6**	3	**7**
(Romania) R Dragomir	2	**6**	6
4	(Canada) P Hy	2	**6**	3
WC	(Australia) **R McQuillan**	**6**	3	**6**
(Switzerland) E Zardo	3	2
7	(United States) **G Helgeson**	**6**	**6**
6	(Japan) **M Endo**	**7**	**6**
Q	(Italy) R Grande	6	3
(Austria) **B Reinstadler**	**6**	3	**7**
3	(United States) A Grossman	4	**6**	5
(Netherlands) N Muns-Jagerman	**7**	4	2
Q	(Netherlands) **K Boogert**	6	**6**	**6**
(Romania) I Spîrlea	6	**6**	1
(Italy) **L Golarsa**	**7**	1	**6**

Quarterfinals
(Italy) S Farina	2	**7**	2
(United States) **C Rubin**	**6**	5	**6**
WC	(Australia) **R McQuillan**	**7**	**7**
7	(United States) G Helgeson	5	6
6	(Japan) **M Endo**	**6**	**6**
(Austria) B Reinstadler	0	3
Q	(Netherlands) **K Boogert**	**7**	**6**
(Italy) L Golarsa	5	3

Semifinals
(United States) C Rubin	**6**	4	3
WC	(Australia) **R McQuillan**	2	**6**	**6**
6	(Japan) **M Endo**	**7**	**4**
Q	(Netherlands) K Boogert	6	2	r

Final
WC	(Australia) Rachel McQuillan	1	**7**	4
6	(Japan) **Mana Endo**	**6**	6	**6**
