= 1986 Virginia Slims of Indianapolis =

Tennis tournament

- Date: October 27 – November 2
- Edition: 7th
- Draw: 32S / 16D
- Prize money: $75,000
- Surface: Hard / outdoor
- Location: Indianapolis, Indiana, U.S.
- Venue: Indianapolis Racquet Club

Champions

Singles
- (United States) Zina Garrison

Doubles
- (United States) Zina Garrison / (United States) Lori McNeil
← 1985 ·	Virginia Slims of Indianapolis	· 1987 →

The 1986 Virginia Slims of Indianapolis was a women's tennis tournament played on outdoor hard courts at the Indianapolis Racquet Club in Indianapolis, Indiana in the United States and was part of the 1986 Virginia Slims World Championship Series. It was the seventh edition of the tournament and ran from October 27 through November 2, 1986. First-seeded Zina Garrison won the singles title.

== Finals ==
=== Singles ===
(United States) Zina Garrison defeated (United States) Melissa Gurney 6–3, 6–3

- It was Garrison's 1st singles title of the year and the 4th of her career.

=== Doubles ===
(United States) Zina Garrison / (United States) Lori McNeil defeated (United States) Candy Reynolds / (United States) Anne Smith 4–5, ret.
