= 1985 Virginia Slims of Indianapolis (October) =

- Date: October 7–13
- Edition: 6th
- Draw: 32S / 16D
- Prize money: $75,000
- Surface: Hard / outdoor
- Location: Indianapolis, Indiana, U.S.
- Venue: Indianapolis Racquet Club

Champions

Singles
- (United States) Bonnie Gadusek

Doubles
- (United States) Bonnie Gadusek / (United States) Mary-Lou Piatek
- Virginia Slims of Indianapolis

The 1985 Virginia Slims of Indianapolis was a women's tennis tournament played on outdoor hard courts at the Indianapolis Racquet Club in Indianapolis, Indiana in the United States and was part of the 1985 Virginia Slims World Championship Series. It was the sixth edition of the tournament and ran from October 7 through October 13, 1985. Second-seeded Bonnie Gadusek won the singles title.

== Finals ==
=== Singles ===
(United States) Bonnie Gadusek defeated (United States) Pam Casale 6–0, 6–3

- It was Gadusek's 4th singles title of the year and the 5th of her career.

=== Doubles ===
(United States) Bonnie Gadusek / (United States) Mary-Lou Piatek defeated (United States) Penny Barg / (United States) Sandy Collins 6–1, 6–0
