= 1993 Danone Women's Open =

- Date: 4–10 January 1993
- Edition: 7th
- Category: Tier III
- Draw: 56S / 28D
- Prize money: $150,000
- Surface: Hard / outdoor
- Location: Brisbane, Australia
- Venue: Milton Tennis Centre

Champions

Singles
- (Spain) Conchita Martínez

Doubles
- (Spain) Conchita Martínez (Latvia) Larisa Neiland
- Danone Hardcourt Championships

The 1993 Danone Women's Open, also known as the Danone Australian Women's Hardcourt Championships, was a women's tennis tournament played on outdoor hard courts at the Milton Tennis Centre in Brisbane in Australia and was part of the Tier III category of the 1993 WTA Tour. It was the seventh edition of the tournament and was held from 4 January through 10 January 1993. First-seeded Conchita Martínez won the singles title and earned $27,000 first-prize money.

== Finals ==
=== Singles ===
(Spain) Conchita Martínez defeated (Bulgaria) Magdalena Maleeva 6–3, 6–4

- It was Martínez's 1st singles title of the year and the 12th of her career.

=== Doubles ===
(Spain) Conchita Martínez / (Latvia) Larisa Neiland defeated (United States) Shannan McCarthy / (United States) Kimberly Po 6–2, 6–2

- It was Martínez's 1st doubles title of the year and the 3rd of her career. It was Savchenko-Neiland's 1st doubles title of the year and the 27th of her career.
