= 1995 Schweppes Tasmanian International =

- Date: 9–14 January
- Edition: 2nd
- Category: Tier IV
- Draw: 32S / 16D
- Prize money: $107,500
- Surface: Hard / outdoor
- Location: Hobart, Australia
- Venue: Domain Tennis Centre

Champions

Singles
- (Georgia (country)) Leila Meskhi

Doubles
- (Japan) Kyoko Nagatsuka / (Japan) Ai Sugiyama
← 1994 ·	Hobart International	· 1996 →

The 1995 Schweppes Tasmanian International was a women's tennis tournament played on outdoor hard courts at the Domain Tennis Centre in Hobart in Australia that was part of Tier IV of the 1995 WTA Tour. It was the second edition of the tournament and was held from 9 through 14 January 1995. Fifth-seeded Leila Meskhi won the singles title and earned $17,000 first-prize money.

== Finals ==
=== Singles ===
(Georgia (country)) Leila Meskhi defeated (China) Fang Li 6–2, 6–3

- It was Meskhi's only title of the year and the 10th of her career.

=== Doubles ===
(Japan) Kyoko Nagatsuka / (Japan) Ai Sugiyama defeated (Netherlands) Manon Bollegraf / (Latvia) Larisa Neiland 2–6, 6–4, 6–2

- It was Nagatsuka's only title of the year and the 1st of her career. It was Sugiyama's only title of the year and the 2nd of her career.
