= Holyn Lord =

American tennis player

- Country (sports): United States
- Born: October 12, 1973 (age 51)
- Prize money: $3,475

Singles
- Career record: 0–5

Doubles
- Career record: 0–1

Holyn Lord Koch (born October 12, 1973) is an American former tennis player.

Lord was the Indiana state singles champion in 1989 and 1990 while at Carmel High School, then from 1993 to 1996 played collegiate tennis for the University of Notre Dame. On the professional tour, she made three main draw appearances at the Virginia Slims of Indianapolis. Her elder sister, Courtney Lord, also competed on the WTA Tour.
