= Beverly Bowes =

American tennis player

- Country (sports): United States
- Born: September 9, 1965 (age 60)
- Prize money: US$ 346,556

Singles
- Career record: 184–179

Grand Slam singles results
- Australian Open: 3R (1987)

Doubles
- Career record: 74–100

Grand Slam doubles results
- Australian Open: 2R (1993)
- French Open: 2R (1989, 1990)
- Wimbledon: 1R (1991)
- US Open: 2R (1988)

Beverly Bowes (born September 9, 1965) is an American former professional tennis player. She competed in the Australian Open six times, from 1987 to 1993.

== Career finals ==
=== Singles (1 runner-up) ===
Result	W/L	Date	Tournament	Surface	Opponent	Score
Loss	0–1	Oct 1988	Nashville, United States	Hard (i)	(United States) Susan Sloane	3–6, 2–6

=== Doubles (1 runner-up) ===
Result	W/L	Date	Tournament	Surface	Partner	Opponents	Score
Loss	0–1	Oct 1987	Indianapolis, United States	Hard (i)	(United States) Hu Na	(Australia) Jenny Byrne (Australia) Michelle Jaggard-Lai	2–6, 3–6
