= Hu Na =

Chinese-American tennis player

- Native name: 胡娜
- Country (sports): China; United States (since 1983); Republic of China (since 1996)
- Residence: Taipei, Taiwan
- Born: April 16, 1963 (age 63) Chengdu, Sichuan, China
- Turned pro: 1981
- Retired: 1991
- Prize money: US$ 214,720

Singles
- Career record: 75-97
- Career titles: 0
- Highest ranking: No. 48 (February 29, 1988)

Grand Slam singles results
- Australian Open: 2R (1987)
- French Open: 2R (1990)
- Wimbledon: 3R (1985)
- US Open: 2R (1985, 1986)

Doubles
- Career record: 45-67
- Career titles: 1 WTA
- Highest ranking: No. 49 (June 25, 1990)

Hu Na (Chinese: 胡娜; pinyin: Hú Nà; born April 16, 1963) is a former professional tennis player best known for defecting from the People's Republic of China to the United States in 1982, thereby sparking a Cold War-era diplomatic incident. Diplomatic relations between the two countries had been established in 1979, and the Hu Na incident was among the first major tests of those newly established relations.

== Early life ==
Hu Na was a young and rising tennis star from China's Sichuan province. She had a talent for sports from an early age, and she spent several hours practicing every day. Her father enrolled her in a special athletic school. She took a special interest in tennis, winning first at provincial-level competition, then the national-level young tennis tournament, making her China's top-ranked tennis player. At this point, she was invited to join the China national women's tennis team, based in Beijing.

== Diplomatic incident ==
=== Beginning of incident ===
In July 1982, while touring California for 1982 Federation Cup with the China Federation Cup team, on her second day in America, Hu Na fled her hotel room and sought refuge in the home of friends. In April 1983, she requested political asylum, stating that she had a "well-founded" fear of persecution because of repeatedly refusing to join the Chinese Communist Party.

=== Immediate reactions of American and Chinese governments ===
The U.S. government allowed her to remain while it considered her request. It delayed nearly eight months in making a decision. On the one hand, Hu Na had considerable sympathy from President Reagan's administration and from the U.S. public, but on the other hand, U.S. diplomats knew that to grant Hu Na asylum almost certainly would damage relations with China and possibly drive it closer to the Soviet Union.

The Chinese government suggested that the 19-year-old star was too young to have made such a decision independently, and it pointed out that her lawyer was being paid for by donations from Taiwan. It promised not to punish her if she returned home, and it implied that separating Hu from her family by keeping her in the United States would be cruel.

=== Granting of asylum ===
The U.S. Department of State issued a memorandum supporting her asylum claim to the U.S. Department of Justice, which had the ultimate responsibility to make a decision. On April 5, 1983, the United States formally granted Hu Na political asylum.

The Chinese government was infuriated, stating that this constituted blatant U.S. intervention in its domestic affairs. It then announced it would sever all cultural and artistic ties between the two countries. A Voice of America radio broadcasting delegation visit to China, scheduled to take place just a few days later, was cancelled. U.S. diplomats in Beijing found themselves cut off from invitations and contacts with the Chinese government.

=== Long-term effects ===
Conservative think-tank The Heritage Foundation called Hu Na's defection a clear win for American foreign policy. Although Hu Na was likely of little concern to the Chinese, the incident was an embarrassment for the Chinese government and brought to light other bilateral points of contention. One contemporary article stated that the Chinese, through diplomatic channels, would not have complained as much if Hu Na had been granted some type of immigration status other than "political asylum".

== Later life ==
After receiving asylum. Hu Na played tennis for the United States. Her best Grand Slam result was a third-round finish at the 1985 Wimbledon. She retired from professional play in 1991 after sustaining injuries.

Hu Na resettled in Taiwan, where she worked as a tennis commentator for ESPN, and she established the Hu Na Bitan Tennis Club in Taipei, which later trained the Taiwanese tennis star Hsieh Su-wei. She has returned to mainland China many times to promote the sport and visit her family.

In 2011, Hu Na had a dream which she interpreted as a sign to start painting. She has established herself as a professional painter. She has produced over 400 paintings in six years. In November 2012, she showed her artwork in her first oil painting world tour. In 2017, Hu Na held the Hu Na Lotus Sutra Oil Painting Collection World Tour.

== WTA Tour finals ==
=== Doubles (1–2) ===
Result	W/L	Date	Tournament	Surface	Partner	Opponents	Score
Loss	0–1	Oct 1987	Indianapolis, United States	Hard (i)	(United States) Beverly Bowes	(Australia) Jenny Byrne (Australia) Michelle Jaggard-Lai	2–6, 3–6
Win	1–1	Jul 1989	Schenectady, United States	Hard	(Australia) Michelle Jaggard-Lai	(United States) Sandra Birch (United States) Debbie Graham	6–3, 6–2
Loss	1–2	Apr 1990	Tokyo, Japan	Hard	(Australia) Michelle Jaggard-Lai	(United States) Kathy Jordan (Australia) Elizabeth Smylie	0–6, 6–3, 1–6

== See also ==
- Tennis in China
