= Michelle Jaggard-Lai =

Australian tennis player

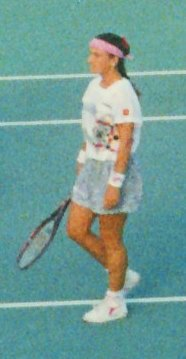
- Jaggard-Lai at the Brisbane Hardcourt Championships, January 1994
- Country (sports): Australia
- Residence: Sydney, Australia
- Born: 6 May 1969 (age 57) Sydney
- Height: 1.63 m (5 ft 4 in)
- Turned pro: 1984
- Retired: 1994
- Plays: Right (two-handed backhand)
- Prize money: US$ 406,279

Singles
- Career record: 179–178
- Career titles: 0 WTA, 2 ITF
- Highest ranking: No. 83 (10 May 1993)

Grand Slam singles results
- Australian Open: 3R (1989)
- French Open: 2R (1989, 1990)
- Wimbledon: 1R (1987, 1988, 1989, 1993)
- US Open: 1R (1993)

Doubles
- Career record: 147–138
- Career titles: 3 WTA, 7 ITF
- Highest ranking: No. 42 (4 February 1991)

Grand Slam doubles results
- Australian Open: QF (1992)
- French Open: 2R (1987, 1988, 1990, 1992)
- Wimbledon: 3R (1993),
- US Open: 3R (1993)

Michelle Jaggard-Lai (born 6 May 1969) is a retired tennis player from Australia. She turned professional in 1984. In her career, Jaggard-Lai won three doubles titles on the WTA Tour. She also reached the quarterfinals of the 1992 Australian Open, partnering Kimiko Date. In singles, she reached round three of the 1989 Australian Open. She reached a career-high doubles ranking of No. 42 in February 1991 and a best singles ranking of No. 83 in May 1993.

Jaggard-Lai was a member of the Australia Fed Cup team that lost in the final of the 1993 Federation Cup.

She played in the singles main draw at the Australian Open eight times, the French Open six times, Wimbledon four times & the US Open once. In doubles, she played in the main draw at the Australian Open seven times, the French Open & Wimbledon nine times, and the US Open six times.

She married ex-professional soccer player Gershwin Lai from the Netherlands, in February or March 1992.

Jaggard-Lai retired from the tour at the end of 1994 (aged just 25 & ranked No. 2 in Australia in singles at the time). Together with her husband, she is a tennis teacher at Wakehurst Tennis in Seaforth, New South Wales, Australia.

== WTA Tour finals ==
=== Doubles: 5 (3 titles, 2 runner-ups) ===
Result	No.	Date	Tournament	Surface	Partner	Opponents	Score
Win	1.	Oct 1987	VS Indianapolis, United States	Hard (i)	(Australia) Jenny Byrne	(United States) Beverly Bowes (United States) Hu Na	6–2, 6–3
Win	2.	Jul 1989	Schenectady, United States	Hard	(United States) Hu Na	(United States) Sandra Birch (United States) Debbie Graham	6–3, 6–2
Loss	1.	Feb 1990	Wellington Classic, New Zealand	Hard	(Australia) Julie Richardson	(Soviet Union) Natalia Medvedeva (Soviet Union) Leila Meskhi	3–6, 6–2, 4–6
Loss	2.	Apr 1990	Japan Open	Hard	(United States) Hu Na	(United States) Kathy Jordan (Australia) Elizabeth Smylie	0–6, 6–3, 1–6
Win	3.	Nov 1994	Taipei Championships, Taiwan	Hard	(Canada) Rene Simpson	(Belgium) Nancy Feber (France) Alexandra Fusai	6–0, 7–6^{(12–10)}

== ITF Circuit finals ==
Legend
$50,000 tournaments
$25,000 tournaments
$10,000 tournaments

=== Singles (2–6) ===
Outcome	No.	Date	Location	Surface	Opponent	Score
Runner-up	1.	12 May 1986	Lee-on-the-Solent, United Kingdom	Clay	(Netherlands) Hellas ter Riet	3–6, 3–6
Runner-up	2.	12 October 1986	Kofu, Japan	Hard	(Japan) Kumiko Okamoto	6–7, 0–6
Winner	1.	11 November 1990	Mount Gambier, Australia	Hard	(Australia) Tracey Morton-Rodgers	7–6, 6–3
Runner-up	3.	18 November 1990	Nuriootpa, Australia	Hard	(Indonesia) Suzanna Wibowo	4–6, 2–6
Runner-up	4.	1 December 1991	Mildura, Australia	Hard	(Australia) Rennae Stubbs	4–6, 6–1, 6–7
Runner-up	5.	23 November 1992	Nuriootpa, Australia	Hard	(France) Alexandra Fusai	6–7, 6–3, 3–6
Winner	2.	21 November 1993	Port Pirie, Australia	Hard	(Australia) Jane Taylor	6–2, 6–1
Runner-up	6.	28 November 1993	Nuriootpa, Australia	Hard	(Australia) Nicole Pratt	7–6, 4–6, 4–6

=== Doubles (7–1) ===
Outcome	No.	Date	Location	Surface	Partner	Opponents	Score
Winner	1.	6 October 1986	Chiba, Japan	Hard	(New Zealand) Belinda Cordwell	(Japan) Kumiko Okamoto (Japan) Naoko Sato	6–2, 7–6^{(3)}
Winner	2.	31 October 1986	Sydney, Australia	Hard	(Australia) Lisa O'Neill	(Australia) Nicole Bradtke (Australia) Louise Field	w/o
Winner	3.	17 September 1990	Chiba, Japan	Hard	(United States) Marianne Werdel	(West Germany) Eva Pfaff (New Zealand) Julie Richardson	6–4, 6–7, 7–6
Winner	4.	10 November 1991	Port Pirie, Australia	Grass	(Australia) Jo-Anne Faull	(Australia) Kerry-Anne Guse (Australia) Justine Hodder	6–2, 7–5
Winner	5.	10 May 1992	Porto, Portugal	Clay	(Spain) Virginia Ruano Pascual	(United States) Jennifer Fuchs (Sweden) Maria Strandlund	6–3, 7–5
Winner	6.	26 October 1992	Jakarta, Indonesia	Clay	(Australia) Kristine Kunce	(Australia) Kristin Godridge (Australia) Nicole Pratt	3–6, 6–3, 6–2
Winner	7.	2 November 1992	Machida, Japan	Grass	(New Zealand) Julie Richardson	(Netherlands) Ingelise Driehuis (Japan) Maya Kidowaki	6–3, 7–5
Runner-up	1.	6 December 1992	Mildura, Australia	Hard	(Australia) Elizabeth Smylie	(Australia) Catherine Barclay (Australia) Louise Stacey	3–6, 4–6
