= Rachel McQuillan =

Australian tennis player

- Country (sports): Australia
- Residence: Newcastle, New South Wales
- Born: 2 December 1971 (age 53); Merewether, New South Wales
- Height: 1.70 m (5 ft 7 in)
- Turned pro: 1987
- Retired: 2003
- Plays: Right (two-handed backhand)
- Coach: Ted McQuillan
- Prize money: US$ 1,622,632

Singles
- Career record: 389–313
- Career titles: 0 WTA, 14 ITF
- Highest ranking: No. 28 (17 June 1991)

Grand Slam singles results
- Australian Open: 4R (1990, 1991)
- French Open: 4R (1991)
- Wimbledon: 2R (1990, 1993, 1994, 1995)
- US Open: 4R (1997)

Doubles
- Career record: 405–274
- Career titles: 5 WTA, 20 ITF
- Highest ranking: No. 15 (22 June 1992)

Grand Slam doubles results
- Australian Open: QF (1990, 1998)
- French Open: 3R (1989, 1990, 1991, 1993, 1994, 1996)
- Wimbledon: QF (2001)
- US Open: QF (1991, 1992)
Medal record
Summer Olympics
Bronze medal – third place	1992 Barcelona	Doubles

Rachel McQuillan (born 2 December 1971) is a retired tennis player from Australia.

She was an Australian Institute of Sport scholarship holder. She won five WTA Tour doubles titles, as well as 14 singles and 21 doubles titles on the ITF Women's Circuit. She reached the mixed doubles semifinals at the 1995 and 1998 French Opens and at the 1996 US Open, each time partnering David Macpherson. She won a bronze medal in doubles at the 1992 Summer Olympics, partnering Nicole Bradtke. McQuillan reached career-high rankings of No. 28 in singles and 15 in doubles.

== WTA career finals ==
=== Singles: 7 (0–7) ===
Legend
Grand Slam	0
Tier I	0
Tier II	0
Tier III	0
Tier IV & V	0

Result	No.	Date	Tournament	Surface	Opponent	Score
Loss	1.	Sep 1989	Athens Trophy, Greece	Clay	(Sweden) Cecilia Dahlman	3–6, 6–1, 5–7
Loss	2.	Jan 1990	Brisbane International, Australia	Hard	(Soviet Union) Natalia Zvereva	4–6, 0–6
Loss	3.	Sep 1990	Kitzbühel Open, Austria	Clay	(West Germany) Claudia Kohde-Kilsch	6–7, 4–6
Loss	4.	May 1991	Internationaux de Strasbourg, France	Clay	(Czechoslovakia) Radomira Zrubáková	6–7^{(3–7)}, 6–7^{(3–7)}
Loss	5.	Jan 1992	Brisbane International, Australia	Hard	(Australia) Nicole Provis	3–6, 2–6
Loss	6.	Jan 1994	Hobart International, Australia	Hard	(Japan) Mana Endo	1–6, 7–6^{(7–1)}, 4–6

=== Doubles: 16 (5–11) ===
Legend
Grand Slam	0
Tier I	0
Tier II	0
Tier III	4
Tier IV & V	1

Titles by surface
Hard	4
Clay	0
Grass	1
Carpet	0

Result	No.	Date	Tournament	Surface	Partner	Opponents	Score
Loss	1.	Feb 1990	Pan Pacific Open, Japan	Carpet (i)	(Australia) Jo-Anne Faull	(United States) Gigi Fernández (Australia) Liz Smylie	2–6, 2–6
Loss	2.	Sep 1990	WTA Bayonne, France	Carpet (i)	(Australia) Jo-Anne Faull	(Australia) Louise Field (France) Catherine Tanvier	6–7, 7–6, 6–7
Win	3.	Aug 1991	Schenectady Open, U.S.	Hard	(Germany) Claudia Porwik	(United States) Nicole Arendt (United States) Shannan McCarthy	6–2, 6–4
Loss	4.	Sep 1991	Bayonne, France	Carpet (i)	(France) Catherine Tanvier	(Argentina) Patricia Tarabini (France) Nathalie Tauziat	3–6, ret.
Loss	5.	Feb 1992	Asian Open Osaka, Japan	Carpet (i)	(United States) Sandy Collins	(Australia) Rennae Stubbs (Czech Republic) Helena Suková	6–3, 4–6, 5–7
Loss	6.	May 1992	Taranto Trophy, Italy	Clay	(Czech Republic) Radomira Zrubáková	(South Africa) Amanda Coetzer (Argentina) Inés Gorrochategui	6–4, 3–6, 6–7^{(0–7)}
Loss	7.	Sep 1992	Paris Open, France	Clay	(France) Noëlle van Lottum	(Argentina) Patricia Tarabini (Italy) Sandra Cecchini	5–7, 1–6
Win	8.	Aug 1993	Schenectady Open, U.S.	Hard	(Germany) Claudia Porwik	(Argentina) Florencia Labat (Germany) Barbara Rittner	4–6, 6–4, 6–2
Win	9.	Sep 1993	Hong Kong Open	Hard	(Germany) Karin Kschwendt	(United States) Debbie Graham (United States) Marianne Werdel-Witmeyer	1–6, 7–6, 6–2
Loss	10.	Jan 1994	Brisbane International, Australia	Hard	(Australia) Jenny Byrne	(Italy) Laura Golarsa (Ukraine) Natalia Medvedeva	3–6, 1–6
Loss	11.	Jan 1994	Hobart International, Australia	Hard	(Australia) Jenny Byrne	(United States) Linda Wild (United States) Chanda Rubin	5–7, 6–4, 6–7^{(1–7)}
Loss	12.	Aug 1994	San Diego Open, U.S.	Hard	(United States) Ginger Helgeson-Nielsen	(Czech Republic) Jana Novotná (Spain) Arantxa Sánchez Vicario	3–6, 3–6
Loss	13.	May 1997	World Doubles Cup, Scotland	Clay	(Japan) Nana Miyagi	(United States) Nicole Arendt (Netherlands) Manon Bollegraf	1–6, 6–3, 7–5
Loss	14.	May 1998	Madrid Masters, Spain	Clay	(Australia) Nicole Pratt	(Argentina) Florencia Labat (Belgium) Dominique Van Roost	3–6, 1–6
Win	15.	Jun 2000	Birmingham Classic, England	Grass	(Australia) Lisa McShea	(Zimbabwe) Cara Black (Kazakhstan) Irina Selyutina	6–3, 7–6^{(7–5)}
Win	16.	Oct 2001	Japan Open	Hard	(South Africa) Liezel Huber	(Chinese Taipei) Janet Lee (Indonesia) Wynne Prakusya	6–2, 6–0

== ITF finals ==
=== Singles: 20 (14–6) ===
Legend
$75,000 tournaments
$50,000 tournaments
$25,000 tournaments
$10,000 tournaments

Result	No.	Date	Tournament	Surface	Opponent	Score
Win	1.	6 December 1987	ITF Sydney, Australia	Grass	(Australia) Kristine Kunce	6–4, 4–6, 6–3
Win	2.	27 March 1988	ITF Melbourne, Australia	Hard	(Australia) Kate McDonald	6–4, 7–6
Loss	1.	24 April 1988	ITF Reggio Calabria, Italy	Clay	(Spain) Conchita Martínez	1–6, 2-6
Win	3.	28 November 1988	ITF Southern Cross, Australia	Hard	(Australia) Michelle Bowrey	7–6, 7–6
Win	4.	17 April 1989	ITF Caserta, Italy	Clay	(Switzerland) Emanuela Zardo	4–6, 7–6, 6–4
Win	5.	24 April 1989	ITF Monte Viso, Italy	Clay	(Soviet Union) Natalia Medvedeva	7–6, 6–1
Loss	2.	4 December 1994	ITF Port Pirie, Australia	Hard	(Australia) Siobhan Drake-Brockman	4–6, 2–6
Loss	3.	17 December 1995	ITF Nuriootpa, Australia	Hard	(Australia) Nicole Bradtke	5–7, 0–6
Win	6.	11 August 1997	ITF Bronx, United States	Hard	(United States) Erika deLone	6–1, 6–4
Win	7.	12 October 1997	ITF Sedona, United States	Hard	(Austria) Sandra Dopfer	6–3, 7–6^{(5)}
Win	8.	28 November 1999	ITF Nuriootpa, Australia	Hard	(Australia) Trudi Musgrave	6–4, 6–2
Win	9.	5 March 2000	ITF Bendigo, Australia	Hard	(Australia) Jaslyn Hewitt	7–5, 4–6, 7–5
Win	10.	23 April 2000	ITF Fresno, United States	Hard	(Canada) Marie-Ève Pelletier	6–1, 6–1
Win	11.	22 October 2000	ITF Brisbane, Australia	Hard	(Australia) Evie Dominikovic	5–4, 4–2, 2–4, 4–2
Loss	4.	29 October 2000	ITF Dalby, Australia	Hard	(Australia) Evie Dominikovic	2–6, 5–7
Loss	5.	5 November 2000	ITF Gold Coast, Australia	Hard	(Australia) Evie Dominikovic	2–6, 4–6
Win	12.	26 November 2000	ITF Nuriootpa, Australia	Hard	(Germany) Marlene Weingärtner	6–4, 6–3
Loss	6.	3 December 2000	ITF Mount Gambier, Australia	Hard	(Australia) Evie Dominikovic	2–6, 1–6
Win	13.	28 October 2002	ITF Dalby, Australia	Hard	(Australia) Evie Dominikovic	6–4, 6–7, 7–5
Win	14.	3 March 2003	ITF Bendigo, Australia	Hard	(Japan) Yuka Yoshida	6–0, 6–2

=== Doubles: 31 (20–11) ===
Result	No.	Date	!Tournament	Surface	Partnering	Opponents	Score
Win	1.	1 November 1987	ITF Gold Coast, Australia	Hard	(Australia) Jo-Anne Faull	(Australia) Kirrily Sharpe (Australia) Janine Thompson	4–6, 6–3, 6–3
Win	2.	8 November 1987	ITF Sydney, Australia	Grass	(Australia) Jo-Anne Faull	(Australia) Sally McCann (Australia) Kristine Kunce	6–3, 6–2
Win	3.	1 March 1988	ITF Newcastle, Australia	Grass	(Australia) Jo-Anne Faull	(Australia) Kate McDonald (Australia) Rennae Stubbs	6–1, 6–3
Loss	1.	6 March 1988	ITF Canberra, Australia	Grass	(Australia) Rennae Stubbs	(Australia) Lisa O'Neill (Australia) Janine Thompson	3–6, 5–7
Win	4.	27 March 1988	ITF Melbourne, Australia	Hard	(Australia) Rennae Stubbs	(Australia) Kristin Godridge (Australia) Kate McDonald	6–4, 7–5
Win	5.	21 November 1988	ITF Gold Coast, Australia	Hard	(Australia) Jo-Anne Faull	(Australia) Michelle Bowrey (Australia) Clare Thompson	6–2, 6–4
Win	6.	28 November 1988	ITF Adelaide, Australia	Hard	(Australia) Jo-Anne Faull	(Australia) Louise Field (Australia) Alison Scott	7–5, 6–4
Loss	2.	10 April 1989	ITF Palermo, Italy	Clay	(Australia) Kristine Kunce	(Italy) Marzia Grossi (Italy) Barbara Romanò	3–6, 2–6
Win	7.	30 April 1989	ITF Verona, Italy	Clay	(Australia) Kristine Kunce	(Australia) Kate McDonald (Australia) Janine Thompson	5–7, 6–4, 6–0
Loss	3.	28 November 1994	ITF Port Pirie, Australia	Hard	(United States) Shannan McCarthy	(Australia) Kristin Godridge (Australia) Kirrily Sharpe	6–7^{(6)}, 2–6
Loss	4.	24 November 1996	ITF Nuriootpa, Australia	Hard	(Australia) Kirrily Sharpe	(Czech Republic) Eva Martincová (Czech Republic) Alena Vašková	3–6, 4–6
Win	8.	16 February 1997	ITF Cali, Colombia	Clay	(Australia) Syna Schreiber	(Portugal) Sofia Prazeres (Paraguay) Larissa Schaerer	6–2, 6–3
Loss	5.	4 August 1997	ITF Salt Lake City, United States	Hard	(Japan) Nana Smith	(United States) Debbie Graham (South Africa) Mariaan de Swardt	6–7, 5–7
Win	9.	17 August 1997	ITF Bronx, United States	Hard	(Australia) Lisa McShea	(United Kingdom) Shirli-Ann Siddall (United Kingdom) Lorna Woodroffe	6–2, 6–1
Loss	6.	5 October 1997	ITF Santa Clara, United States	Hard	(Japan) Nana Smith	(Australia) Lisa McShea (South Africa) Nannie de Villiers	6–7, 6–7
Win	10.	19 October 1997	ITF Indian Wells, United States	Hard	(Australia) Kristine Kunce	(Australia) Lisa McShea (South Africa) Nannie de Villiers	7–5, 6–4
Win	11.	26 October 1997	ITF Houston, United States	Hard	(Japan) Nana Smith	(United States) Ginger Helgeson-Nielsen (Australia) Kristine Kunce	6–0, 3–6, 6–2
Win	12.	5 October 1998	ITF Albuquerque, United States	Hard	(Japan) Nana Smith	(United States) Erika deLone (Australia) Nicole Pratt	7–6^{(5)}, 6–2
Win	13.	15 March 1999	ITF Ashkelon, Israel	Hard	(Australia) Louise Pleming	(Belarus) Nadejda Ostrovskaya (Belarus) Tatiana Poutchek	6–3, 6–2
Win	14.	4 April 1999	ITF Claremont, United States	Hard	(Japan) Nana Smith	(Japan) Rika Hiraki (South Africa) Nannie de Villiers	6–2, 6–3
Win	15.	1 August 1999	ITF Salt Lake City, United States	Hard	(Australia) Lisa McShea	(Australia) Annabel Ellwood (Canada) Sonya Jeyaseelan	6–3, 4–6, 6–3
Loss	7.	26 September 1999	ITF Kirkland, United States	Hard	(Australia) Kristine Kunce	(United States) Debbie Graham (Japan) Nana Smith	3–6, 1–6
Win	16.	21 November 1999	ITF Bendigo, Australia	Hard	(Australia) Trudi Musgrave	(United States) Amanda Augustus (United States) Julie Thu	6–4, 7–5
Loss	8.	28 November 1999	ITF Nurioopta, Australia	Hard	(Australia) Trudi Musgrave	(Australia) Louise Pleming (Kazakhstan) Irina Selyutina	4–6, 4–6
Win	17.	23 April 2000	ITF Fresno, United States	Hard	(Australia) Lisa McShea	(Australia) Evie Dominikovic (Australia) Amanda Grahame	6–4, 6–4
Loss	9.	20 October 2000	ITF Brisbane, Australia	Hard	(Australia) Kerry-Anne Guse	(Australia) Annabel Ellwood (South Africa) Nannie de Villiers	5–3, 2–4, 3–5, 1–4
Win	18.	29 October 2000	ITF Dalby, Australia	Hard	(Australia) Kerry-Anne Guse	(Australia) Melanie Clayton (United States) Nadia Johnston	3–0 ret.
Loss	10.	26 November 2000	ITF Nuriootpa, Australia	Hard	(Australia) Lisa McShea	(South Africa) Nannie de Villiers (Australia) Annabel Ellwood	6–7^{(1)}, 3–6
Win	19.	8 April 2001	ITF West Palm Beach, United States	Clay	(Australia) Lisa McShea	(Japan) Rika Hiraki (Japan) Nana Miyagi	6–3, 6–3
Loss	11.	28 July 2002	ITF Lexington, United States	Hard	(Australia) Lisa McShea	(Japan) Nana Miyagi (Kazakhstan) Irina Selyutina	7–6^{(2)}, 2–6, 5–7
Win	20.	18 November 2002	ITF Nuriootpa, Australia	Hard	(Australia) Evie Dominikovic	(United States) Amanda Augustus (United States) Gabriela Lastra	7–5, 6–3
