= Jenny Byrne =

Australian tennis player (born 1967)

- Country (sports): Australia
- Born: 25 February 1967 (age 59) Perth, Australia
- Height: 163 cm (5 ft 4 in)
- Plays: Right-handed
- Prize money: US$ 515,140

Singles
- Career record: 197–199
- Career titles: 0 WTA, 4 ITF
- Highest ranking: No. 45 (22 May 1989)

Grand Slam singles results
- Australian Open: 3R (1988, 1992)
- French Open: 3R (1986, 1988)
- Wimbledon: 2R (1994)
- US Open: 3R (1993)

Doubles
- Career record: 185–170
- Career titles: 2 WTA, 3 ITF
- Highest ranking: No. 27 (24 October 1988)

Grand Slam doubles results
- Australian Open: 3R (1987, 1988, 1996)
- French Open: SF (1987)
- Wimbledon: QF (1986)
- US Open: QF (1988, 1989)

Grand Slam mixed doubles results
- Australian Open: QF (1989)
- French Open: 3R (1984, 1987)
- Wimbledon: F (1989)
- US Open: QF (1986, 1987)

Jenny Margaret Byrne (born 25 February 1967) is a former tennis player from Australia who turned professional in 1987 and retired from the tour in 1997. Her career-high world rankings were world No. 45 in singles (in 1989) and world No. 27 in doubles (in 1988).

Byrne finished runner-up in the mixed-doubles competition at Wimbledon in 1989, partnering Mark Kratzmann. In 1992, she won the Women's Tennis Association's 'Comeback Player of the Year' award. As a junior player, Byrne won the girls' singles title at the Australian Open and finished runner-up in the girls' singles at Wimbledon in 1985.

== Grand Slam tournament finals ==
=== Mixed doubles: 1 (runner-up) ===
Result	No.	Date	Tournament	Surface	Partner	Opponents	Score
Loss	1.	Jul 1989	Wimbledon, England	Grass	(Australia) Mark Kratzmann	(Czechoslovakia) Jana Novotná (United States) Jim Pugh	4–6, 7–5, 4–6

== WTA career finals ==
=== Singles: 2 (2 runner-ups) ===
Legend
Grand Slam	0
Tier I	0
Tier II	0
Tier III	0
Tier IV & V	0

Result	No.	Date	Tournament	Surface	Opponent	Score
Loss	1.	Mar 1989	Indian Wells, United States	Hard	(Bulgaria) Manuela Maleeva	4–6, 1–6
Loss	2.	Jun 1992	Birmingham, England	Grass	(Netherlands) Brenda Schultz	2–6, 2–6

=== Doubles: 9 (2 titles, 7 runner-ups) ===
Legend
Grand Slam	0
Tier I	0
Tier II	0
Tier III	0
Tier IV & V	0

Titles by surface
Hard	0
Clay	0
Grass	0
Carpet	0

Result	No.	Date	Tournament	Surface	Partner	Opponents	Score
Loss	1.	May 1986	Lugano, Switzerland	Clay	(Australia) Janine Thompson	(United States) Elise Burgin (United States) Betsy Nagelsen	2–6, 3–6
Loss	2.	Jan 1987	Sydney, Australia	Clay	(Australia) Janine Thompson	(United States) Betsy Nagelsen (United States) Elizabeth Smylie	7–6^{(7–5)}, 5–7, 1–6
Win	1.	Oct 1987	Indianapolis, United States	Hard (i)	(Australia) Michelle Jaggard-Lai	(United States) Beverly Bowes (United States) Hu Na	6–2, 6–3
Loss	3.	May 1988	Rome, Italy	Clay	(Australia) Janine Thompson	(Czechoslovakia) Jana Novotná (France) Catherine Suire	3–6, 6–4, 5–7
Loss	4.	May 1988	Strasbourg, France	Clay	(Australia) Janine Thompson	(Australia) Nicole Bradtke (Netherlands) Manon Bollegraf	5–7, 7–6^{(13–11)}, 3–6
Win	2.	Oct 1988	Nashville, United States	Hard	(Australia) Janine Thompson	(United States) Elise Burgin (South Africa) Rosalyn Fairbank	7–5, 6–7^{(1–7)}, 6–4
Loss	5.	Jan 1994	Brisbane, Australia	Hard	(Australia) Rachel McQuillan	(Italy) Laura Golarsa (Ukraine) Natalia Medvedeva	3–6, 1–6
Loss	6.	Jan 1994	Hobart, Australia	Hard	(Australia) Rachel McQuillan	(United States) Linda Wild (United States) Chanda Rubin	5–7, 6–4, 6–7^{(1–7)}
Loss	7.	Feb 1994	Auckland, New Zealand	Hard	(New Zealand) Julie Richardson	(Canada) Patricia Hy-Boulais (Argentina) Mercedes Paz	4–6, 6–7^{(3–7)}

== ITF finals ==
$25,000 tournaments
$10,000 tournaments

=== Singles (4–1) ===
Result	No.	Date	Location	Surface	Opponent	Score
Win	1.	14 October 1984	Wyong, Australia	Grass	(New Zealand) Michelle Parun	6–2, 6–2
Win	2.	25 August 1991	Tarakan, Indonesia	Hard	(Indonesia) Tanya Soemarno	6–0, 6–2
Loss	1.	10 November 1991	Port Pirie, Australia	Hard	(Australia) Louise Field	4–6, 4–6
Win	3.	17 November 1991	Bendigo, Australia	Hard	(Australia) Kristin Godridge	0–6, 6–4, 6–4
Win	4.	8 December 1991	Perth, Australia	Hard	(Australia) Kate McDonald	6–2, 6–4

=== Doubles (3–1) ===
Result	No.	Date	Location	Surface	Partnering	Opponents	Score
Loss	1.	21 October 1983	Gold Coast, Australia	Hard	(Australia) Amanda Tobin	(Australia) Nerida Gregory (Australia) Bernadette Randall	6–7, 6–7
Win	1.	31 October 1983	Tamworth, Australia	Hard	(Australia) Amanda Tobin	(Australia) Debbie Mills (New Zealand) Chris Newton	5–7, 6–2, 7–5
Win	2.	7 October 1991	Matsuyama, Japan	Hard	(Hong Kong) Paulette Moreno	(Philippines) Jennifer Saret (China) Yi Jing-Qian	1–6, 6–4, 6–4
Win	3.	4 December 1995	Port Pirie, Australia	Hard	(Australia) Catherine Barclay	(South Africa) Mareze Joubert (Australia) Joanne Limmer	6–1, 6–3
