= Virginia Slims of Indianapolis =

Defunct tennis tournament
- Event name: Virginia Slims Indoor (1972); Virginia Slims of Indianapolis (1973); Ginny of Indianapolis (1983-84); Virginia Slims of Indianapolis (1985-89); Indianapolis Tennis Classic (1990–92)
- Tour: WTA Tour (1972–73, 1983–92)
- Founded: 1972
- Abolished: 1992
- Editions: 13
- Surface: Carpet (1972–73, 1983–85); Hard (1986–92)

The Virginia Slims of Indianapolis is a defunct WTA Tour affiliated tennis tournament played from 1972 to 1973 and from 1983 to 1992. It was held in Indianapolis in the United States and played on indoor carpet courts from 1972 to 1973 and from 1983 to 1992. It was played on indoor hard courts from 1986 to 1992.

Katerina Maleeva was the most successful player at the tournament, winning the singles competition three times.

== Results ==
=== Singles ===
Year	Champions	Runners-up	Score
1972	(United States) Billie Jean King	(United States) Nancy Gunter	6–3, 6–3
1973	(United States) Billie Jean King	(United States) Rosemary Casals	5–7, 6–2, 6–4
1974 - 1982	Not Held		
1983	(United Kingdom) Anne Hobbs	(United States) Ginny Purdy	6–4, 6–7, 6–4
1984	(United States) JoAnne Russell	(France) Pascale Paradis	7–6, 6–2
1985 (Mar)	(United States) Kathleen Horvath	(United States) Elise Burgin	6–2, 6–4
1985 (Oct)	(United States) Bonnie Gadusek	(United States) Pam Casale	6–0, 6–3
1986	(United States) Zina Garrison	(United States) Melissa Gurney	6–3, 6–3
1987	(United States) Halle Cioffi	(United States) Anne Smith	4–6, 6–4, 7–6^{(12–10)}
1988	(Bulgaria) Katerina Maleeva	(United States) Zina Garrison	6–3, 2–6, 6–2
1989	(Bulgaria) Katerina Maleeva	(Italy) Raffaella Reggi	6–4, 6–4
1990	(Spain) Conchita Martínez	(Soviet Union) Leila Meskhi	6–4, 6–2
1991	(Bulgaria) Katerina Maleeva	(United States) Audra Keller	7–6^{(7–1)}, 6–2
1992	(Czechoslovakia) Helena Suková	(United States) Linda Harvey-Wild	6–4, 6–3

=== Doubles ===
Year	Champions	Runners-up	Score
1972	(United States) Rosemary Casals (Australia) Karen Krantzcke	(Australia) Judy Tegart (France) Françoise Dürr	6–3, 6–2
1973	(United States) Rosemary Casals (United States) Billie Jean King	(Australia) Margaret Court (Australia) Lesley Hunt	7–5, 6–4
1974 - 1982	Not held		
1983	(United States) Lea Antonoplis (United States) Barbara Jordan	(South Africa) Yvonne Vermaak (United States) Candy Reynolds	5–7, 6–4, 7–5
1984	(Brazil) Cláudia Monteiro (South Africa) Yvonne Vermaak	(South Africa) Beverly Mould (Australia) Elizabeth Smylie	6–7, 6–4, 7–5
1985 (Mar)	(United States) Elise Burgin (United States) Kathleen Horvath	(South Africa) Jennifer Mundel (United States) Molly Van Nostrand	6–4, 6–1
1985 (Oct)	(United States) Bonnie Gadusek (United States) Mary-Lou Piatek	(United States) Penny Barg (United States) Sandy Collins	6–1, 6–0
1986	(United States) Zina Garrison (United States) Lori McNeil	(United States) Candy Reynolds (United States) Anne Smith	4–5 ret.
1987	(Australia) Jenny Byrne (Australia) Michelle Jaggard	(United States) Beverly Bowes (United States) Hu Na	6–2, 6–3
1988	(Soviet Union) Larisa Savchenko (Soviet Union) Natasha Zvereva	(United States) Katrina Adams (United States) Zina Garrison	6–2, 6–1
1989	(United States) Katrina Adams (United States) Lori McNeil	(West Germany) Claudia Porwik (Soviet Union) Larisa Savchenko	6–4, 6–4
1990	(United States) Patty Fendick (United States) Meredith McGrath	(United States) Katrina Adams (Canada) Jill Hetherington	6–1, 6–1
1991	(United States) Patty Fendick (United States) Gigi Fernández	(United States) Katrina Adams (Argentina) Mercedes Paz	6–4, 6–2
1992	(United States) Katrina Adams (South Africa) Elna Reinach	(United States) Sandy Collins (United States) Mary-Lou Daniels	5–7, 6–2, 6–4
