= 1988 Virginia Slims World Championship Series =

Women's tennis circuit

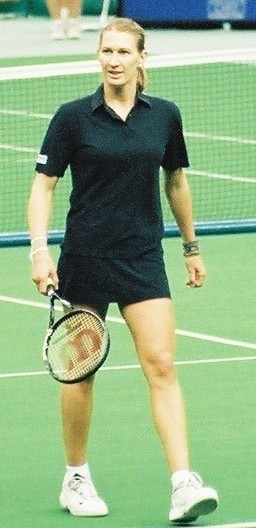
- Steffi Graf finished the year as world No. 1 for the second time in her career. She won eleven tournaments during the season, including all four majors at the Australian Open, the French Open, the Wimbledon Championships, and the US Open, to complete the Grand Slam. She also claimed the gold medal at the Seoul Olympics to complete the only Golden Slam in tennis history.

Details
- Duration: November 30, 1987 – November 27, 1988
- Edition: 16th
- Tournaments: 63
- Categories: Grand Slam (4); WTA Championships; Summer Olympics; Category 6 (1); Category 5 (8); Category 4 (10); Category 3 (8); Category 2 (14); Category 1 (16)

Achievements (singles)
- Most titles: (West Germany) Steffi Graf (11)
- Most finals: (West Germany) Steffi Graf (12)
- Prize money leader: (West Germany) Steffi Graf $1,378,128
- Points leader: (West Germany) Steffi Graf 325.78

Awards
- Player of the year: (West Germany) Steffi Graf
- Doubles team of the year: (United States) Martina Navratilova (United States) Pam Shriver
- Most improved player of the year: (Spain) Arantxa Sánchez Vicario
- Newcomer of the year: (Soviet Union) Natasha Zvereva
- Comeback player of the year: (France) Pascale Paradis

The 1988 Virginia Slims World Championship Series was the 16th elite tour for professional women's tennis of the Women's International Tennis Association (WITA) for the 1988 season. The 1988 Virginia Slims World Championship Series included the four Grand Slam tournaments, the WITA Tour Championships and the WTA Category 1-5 events. ITF tournaments were not part of the WTA Tour, although they award points for the WTA World Ranking.

The tour was governed by the Women's International Professional Tennis Council (WIPTC), a cooperation between WITA, ITF and recognized tournaments. Philip Morris sponsored the tour under its Virginia Slims brand.

Steffi Graf became the first singles player in history to win the Golden Slam by taking the Australian Open, French Open, Wimbledon and US Open singles titles, along with the Olympic gold medal. Graf's defeat by Pam Shriver in the semifinals of the Virginia Slims Championships deprived her of a Super Slam.

== Schedule ==
The table below shows the 1988 WTA Tour schedule.

Key

Grand Slam tournaments
Year-end championships
Category 6 events
Category 5 events
Category 4 events
Category 3 events
Category 2 and 1 events
Summer Olympics
Team events

=== December 1987 ===
Week	Tournament	Champions	Runners-up	Semifinalists	Quarterfinalists
30 Nov	Argentine Open; Buenos Aires, Argentina; Category 1 Clay – $50,000 -56S/28D/32Q; Singles – Doubles	(Argentina) Gabriela Sabatini; 6–0, 6–2	(West Germany) Isabel Cueto	(Argentina) Bettina Fulco (Austria) Barbara Paulus	(Argentina) Mercedes Paz (Brazil) Gisele Miró (Argentina) Patricia Tarabini (Italy) Laura Garrone
30 Nov	Argentine Open; Buenos Aires, Argentina; Category 1 Clay – $50,000 -56S/28D/32Q; Singles – Doubles	(Argentina) Mercedes Paz (Argentina) Gabriela Sabatini; 6–2, 6–2	(Canada) Jill Hetherington (Switzerland) Christiane Jolissaint	(Argentina) Bettina Fulco (Austria) Barbara Paulus	(Argentina) Mercedes Paz (Brazil) Gisele Miró (Argentina) Patricia Tarabini (Italy) Laura Garrone
7 Dec	Brazilian Open; Guarujá, Brazil; Category 1 Clay – $50,000 – 32S/16D/32Q; Singles – Doubles	(Brazil) Neige Dias; 6–0, 6–7^{(2–7)}, 6–4	(Brazil) Pat Madrado	(United States) Amy Frazier (Argentina) Bettina Fulco	(Austria) Barbara Paulus (Italy) Laura Garrone (Argentina) Mercedes Paz (United States) Céline Cohen
7 Dec	Brazilian Open; Guarujá, Brazil; Category 1 Clay – $50,000 – 32S/16D/32Q; Singles – Doubles	(United States) Katrina Adams (United States) Cheryl Jones; 6–4, 4–6, 6–4	(Canada) Jill Hetherington (Argentina) Mercedes Paz	(United States) Amy Frazier (Argentina) Bettina Fulco	(Austria) Barbara Paulus (Italy) Laura Garrone (Argentina) Mercedes Paz (United States) Céline Cohen
28 Dec	Ariadne Women's Classic; Brisbane, Australia; Category 2 Grass – $150,000 – 56S/32D/32Q; Singles – Doubles	(United States) Pam Shriver; 7–6^{(8–6)}, 7–6^{(7–4)}	(Czechoslovakia) Jana Novotná	(West Germany) Claudia Kohde-Kilsch (United States) Patty Fendick	(West Germany) Claudia Porwik (Netherlands) Manon Bollegraf (West Germany) Sylvia Hanika (France) Pascale Paradis
28 Dec	Ariadne Women's Classic; Brisbane, Australia; Category 2 Grass – $150,000 – 56S/32D/32Q; Singles – Doubles	(United States) Betsy Nagelsen (United States) Pam Shriver; 2–6, 7–5, 6–2	(West Germany) Claudia Kohde-Kilsch (Czechoslovakia) Helena Suková	(West Germany) Claudia Kohde-Kilsch (United States) Patty Fendick	(West Germany) Claudia Porwik (Netherlands) Manon Bollegraf (West Germany) Sylvia Hanika (France) Pascale Paradis

=== January ===
Week	Tournament	Champions	Runners-up	Semifinalists	Quarterfinalists
4 Jan	New South Wales Open; Sydney, Australia; Category 3 Grass – $200,000 – 56S/32D/32Q; Singles – Doubles	(United States) Pam Shriver; 6–2, 6–3	(Czechoslovakia) Helena Suková	(West Germany) Claudia Kohde-Kilsch (United States) Patty Fendick	(Sweden) Catarina Lindqvist (Japan) Etsuko Inoue (United States) Brenda Schultz (Netherlands) Hester Witvoet
4 Jan	New South Wales Open; Sydney, Australia; Category 3 Grass – $200,000 – 56S/32D/32Q; Singles – Doubles	(United States) Ann Henricksson (Switzerland) Christiane Jolissaint; 7–5, 4–6, 6–3	(West Germany) Claudia Kohde-Kilsch (Czechoslovakia) Helena Suková	(West Germany) Claudia Kohde-Kilsch (United States) Patty Fendick	(Sweden) Catarina Lindqvist (Japan) Etsuko Inoue (United States) Brenda Schultz (Netherlands) Hester Witvoet
11 Jan; 18 Jan	Australian Open; Melbourne, Australia; Grand Slam; Hard – $711,445 – 128S/64D/32X/64Q; Singles – Doubles – Mixed doubles	(West Germany) Steffi Graf; 6–1, 7–6^{(7–3)}	(United States) Chris Evert	(West Germany) Claudia Kohde-Kilsch (United States) Martina Navratilova	(Czechoslovakia) Hana Mandlíková (West Germany) Claudia Porwik (Australia) Anne Minter (Czechoslovakia) Helena Suková
11 Jan; 18 Jan	Australian Open; Melbourne, Australia; Grand Slam; Hard – $711,445 – 128S/64D/32X/64Q; Singles – Doubles – Mixed doubles	(United States) Martina Navratilova (United States) Pam Shriver; 6–0, 7–5	(United States) Chris Evert (Australia) Wendy Turnbull	(West Germany) Claudia Kohde-Kilsch (United States) Martina Navratilova	(Czechoslovakia) Hana Mandlíková (West Germany) Claudia Porwik (Australia) Anne Minter (Czechoslovakia) Helena Suková
11 Jan; 18 Jan	Australian Open; Melbourne, Australia; Grand Slam; Hard – $711,445 – 128S/64D/32X/64Q; Singles – Doubles – Mixed doubles	(Czechoslovakia) Jana Novotná (United States) Jim Pugh; 5–7, 6–2, 6–4	(United States) Martina Navratilova (United States) Tim Gullikson	(West Germany) Claudia Kohde-Kilsch (United States) Martina Navratilova	(Czechoslovakia) Hana Mandlíková (West Germany) Claudia Porwik (Australia) Anne Minter (Czechoslovakia) Helena Suková
25 Jan	Nutri-Metics Open; Auckland, New Zealand; Category 1 $50,000 -Hard – 56S/32D/32Q; Singles – Doubles	(United States) Patty Fendick; 6–3, 7–6^{(7–3)}	(United Kingdom) Sara Gomer	(United States) Beverly Bowes (France) Emmanuelle Derly	(Belgium) Sandra Wasserman (United States) Terry Phelps (United States) Gretchen Magers (United Kingdom) Clare Wood
25 Jan	Nutri-Metics Open; Auckland, New Zealand; Category 1 $50,000 -Hard – 56S/32D/32Q; Singles – Doubles	(United States) Patty Fendick (Canada) Jill Hetherington; 6–2, 6–1	(United States) Cammy MacGregor (United States) Cynthia MacGregor	(United States) Beverly Bowes (France) Emmanuelle Derly	(Belgium) Sandra Wasserman (United States) Terry Phelps (United States) Gretchen Magers (United Kingdom) Clare Wood

=== February ===
Week	Tournament	Champions	Runners-up	Semifinalists	Quarterfinalists
1 Feb	Fernleaf Classic; Wellington, New Zealand; Category 1 Hard – $50,000 – 56S/32D/32Q; Singles – Doubles	(Canada) Jill Hetherington; 6–1, 6–1	(United States) Katrina Adams	(United States) Patty Fendick (Australia) Anne Minter	(Netherlands) Simone Schilder (United States) Terry Phelps (United States) Gretchen Magers (New Zealand) Belinda Cordwell
1 Feb	Fernleaf Classic; Wellington, New Zealand; Category 1 Hard – $50,000 – 56S/32D/32Q; Singles – Doubles	(United States) Patty Fendick (Canada) Jill Hetherington; 6–3, 6–3	(New Zealand) Belinda Cordwell (Australia) Julie Richardson	(United States) Patty Fendick (Australia) Anne Minter	(Netherlands) Simone Schilder (United States) Terry Phelps (United States) Gretchen Magers (New Zealand) Belinda Cordwell
8 Feb	Virginia Slims of Dallas; Dallas, United States; Category 4 Hard – $250,000 – 32S/16D/32Q; Singles – Doubles	(United States) Martina Navratilova; 6–0, 6–3	(United States) Pam Shriver	(United States) Zina Garrison (Bulgaria) Manuela Maleeva-Fragnière	(Bulgaria) Katerina Maleeva (United States) Barbara Potter (United States) Mary Lou Daniels (Soviet Union) Natasha Zvereva
8 Feb	Virginia Slims of Dallas; Dallas, United States; Category 4 Hard – $250,000 – 32S/16D/32Q; Singles – Doubles	(United States) Lori McNeil (West Germany) Eva Pfaff; 2–6, 6–4, 7–5	(United States) Gigi Fernández (United States) Zina Garrison	(United States) Zina Garrison (Bulgaria) Manuela Maleeva-Fragnière	(Bulgaria) Katerina Maleeva (United States) Barbara Potter (United States) Mary Lou Daniels (Soviet Union) Natasha Zvereva
15 Feb	Virginia Slims of California; Oakland, United States; Category 4 Hard (i) – $250,000 – 32S/16D/32Q; Singles – Doubles	(United States) Martina Navratilova; 6–1, 6–2	(Soviet Union) Larisa Savchenko	(United States) Zina Garrison (Argentina) Gabriela Sabatini	(Soviet Union) Natasha Zvereva (United States) Hu Na (Czechoslovakia) Hana Mandlíková (United States) Robin White
15 Feb	Virginia Slims of California; Oakland, United States; Category 4 Hard (i) – $250,000 – 32S/16D/32Q; Singles – Doubles	(United States) Rosie Casals (United States) Martina Navratilova; 6–4, 6–4	(Czechoslovakia) Hana Mandlíková (Czechoslovakia) Jana Novotná	(United States) Zina Garrison (Argentina) Gabriela Sabatini	(Soviet Union) Natasha Zvereva (United States) Hu Na (Czechoslovakia) Hana Mandlíková (United States) Robin White
22 Feb	Virginia Slims of Washington; Washington, United States; Category 5 Hard (i) – $300,000 – 32S/16D/32Q; Singles – Doubles	(United States) Martina Navratilova; 6–0, 6–2	(United States) Pam Shriver	(Czechoslovakia) Hana Mandlíková (Argentina) Gabriela Sabatini	(United States) Zina Garrison (Soviet Union) Natasha Zvereva (United States) Barbara Potter (Czechoslovakia) Helena Suková
22 Feb	Virginia Slims of Washington; Washington, United States; Category 5 Hard (i) – $300,000 – 32S/16D/32Q; Singles – Doubles	(United States) Martina Navratilova (United States) Pam Shriver; 6–3, 6–4	(Argentina) Gabriela Sabatini (Czechoslovakia) Helena Suková	(Czechoslovakia) Hana Mandlíková (Argentina) Gabriela Sabatini	(United States) Zina Garrison (Soviet Union) Natasha Zvereva (United States) Barbara Potter (Czechoslovakia) Helena Suková
22 Feb	Virginia Slims of Oklahoma; Oklahoma City, United States; Category 2 Hard – $100,000 – 32S/16D/32Q; Singles – Doubles	(United States) Lori McNeil; 6–3, 6–2	(United States) Brenda Schultz	(Sweden) Catarina Lindqvist (Italy) Raffaella Reggi	(Canada) Helen Kelesi (South Africa) Dinky Van Rensburg (South Africa) Elna Reinach (Czechoslovakia) Jana Novotná
22 Feb	Virginia Slims of Oklahoma; Oklahoma City, United States; Category 2 Hard – $100,000 – 32S/16D/32Q; Singles – Doubles	(Czechoslovakia) Jana Novotná (France) Catherine Suire; 6–4, 6–4	(Sweden) Catarina Lindqvist (Denmark) Tine Scheuer-Larsen	(Sweden) Catarina Lindqvist (Italy) Raffaella Reggi	(Canada) Helen Kelesi (South Africa) Dinky Van Rensburg (South Africa) Elna Reinach (Czechoslovakia) Jana Novotná
29 Feb	Virginia Slims of Kansas; Kansas City, United States; Category 2 Hard (i) – $100,000 – 32S/16D/32Q; Singles – Doubles	(Bulgaria) Manuela Maleeva-Fragnière; 7–6^{(7–5)}, 7–5	(West Germany) Sylvia Hanika	(Soviet Union) Svetlana Parkhomenko (Netherlands) Hester Witvoet	(Czechoslovakia) Jana Novotná (Soviet Union) Natalia Bykova (United States) Peanut Louie-Harper (France) Pascale Paradis
29 Feb	Virginia Slims of Kansas; Kansas City, United States; Category 2 Hard (i) – $100,000 – 32S/16D/32Q; Singles – Doubles	(Soviet Union) Natalia Bykova (Soviet Union) Svetlana Parkhomenko; 6–3, 6–4	(Czechoslovakia) Jana Novotná (France) Catherine Suire	(Soviet Union) Svetlana Parkhomenko (Netherlands) Hester Witvoet	(Czechoslovakia) Jana Novotná (Soviet Union) Natalia Bykova (United States) Peanut Louie-Harper (France) Pascale Paradis
29 Feb	U.S. Women's Hard Court Championships; San Antonio, United States; Category 3 Hard – $200,000 – 32S/16D/32Q; Singles – Doubles	(West Germany) Steffi Graf; 6–4, 6–1	(Bulgaria) Katerina Maleeva	(United States) Lori McNeil (Czechoslovakia) Helena Suková	(France) Nathalie Tauziat (Soviet Union) Natasha Zvereva (Japan) Etsuko Inoue (United States) Patty Fendick
29 Feb	U.S. Women's Hard Court Championships; San Antonio, United States; Category 3 Hard – $200,000 – 32S/16D/32Q; Singles – Doubles	(United States) Lori McNeil (Czechoslovakia) Helena Suková; 6–3, 6–7, 6–2	(South Africa) Rosalyn Fairbank (United States) Gretchen Magers	(United States) Lori McNeil (Czechoslovakia) Helena Suková	(France) Nathalie Tauziat (Soviet Union) Natasha Zvereva (Japan) Etsuko Inoue (United States) Patty Fendick

=== March ===
Week	Tournament	Champions	Runners-up	Semifinalists	Quarterfinalists
7 Mar	Virginia Slims of Florida; Boca Raton, United States; Category 5 Hard – $300,000 – 56S/32D/32Q; Singles – Doubles	(Argentina) Gabriela Sabatini; 2–6, 6–3, 6–1	(West Germany) Steffi Graf	(United States) Pam Shriver (United States) Chris Evert	(France) Pascale Paradis (United States) Gigi Fernández (United States) Mary Joe Fernández (Italy) Sandra Cecchini
7 Mar	Virginia Slims of Florida; Boca Raton, United States; Category 5 Hard – $300,000 – 56S/32D/32Q; Singles – Doubles	(United States) Katrina Adams (United States) Zina Garrison; 4–6, 7–5, 6–4	(West Germany) Claudia Kohde-Kilsch (Czechoslovakia) Helena Suková	(United States) Pam Shriver (United States) Chris Evert	(France) Pascale Paradis (United States) Gigi Fernández (United States) Mary Joe Fernández (Italy) Sandra Cecchini
14 Mar; 21 Mar	Lipton International Players Championships; Key Biscayne, United States; Category 6 (Tier I); Hard – $750,000 – 128S/64D/64Q; Singles – Doubles	(West Germany) Steffi Graf; 6–4, 6–4	(United States) Chris Evert	(United States) Stephanie Rehe (United States) Mary Joe Fernández	(West Germany) Claudia Kohde-Kilsch (Italy) Barbara Potter (South Africa) Elna Reinach (Czechoslovakia) Helena Suková
14 Mar; 21 Mar	Lipton International Players Championships; Key Biscayne, United States; Category 6 (Tier I); Hard – $750,000 – 128S/64D/64Q; Singles – Doubles	(West Germany) Steffi Graf (Argentina) Gabriela Sabatini; 7–6^{(8–6)}, 6–3	(United States) Gigi Fernández (United States) Zina Garrison	(United States) Stephanie Rehe (United States) Mary Joe Fernández	(West Germany) Claudia Kohde-Kilsch (Italy) Barbara Potter (South Africa) Elna Reinach (Czechoslovakia) Helena Suková
28 Mar	Eckerd Open; Tampa, United States; Category 3 Clay – $200,000 – 32S/16D/32Q; Singles – Doubles	(United States) Chris Evert; 7–6^{(7–3)}, 6–4	(Spain) Arantxa Sánchez Vicario	(United States) Halle Cioffi (Argentina) Patricia Tarabini	(West Germany) Sylvia Hanika (West Germany) Wiltrud Probst (Bulgaria) Katerina Maleeva (Bulgaria) Manuela Maleeva-Fragnière
28 Mar	Eckerd Open; Tampa, United States; Category 3 Clay – $200,000 – 32S/16D/32Q; Singles – Doubles	(United States) Terry Phelps (Italy) Raffaella Reggi; 6–2, 6–4	(United States) Cammy MacGregor (United States) Cynthia MacGregor	(United States) Halle Cioffi (Argentina) Patricia Tarabini	(West Germany) Sylvia Hanika (West Germany) Wiltrud Probst (Bulgaria) Katerina Maleeva (Bulgaria) Manuela Maleeva-Fragnière

=== April ===
Week	Tournament	Champions	Runners-up	Semifinalists	Quarterfinalists
4 Apr	Family Circle Cup; Hilton Head Island, United States; Category 5 Clay – $300,000 – 56S/28D/32Q; Singles – Doubles	(United States) Martina Navratilova; 6–1, 4–6, 6–4	(Argentina) Gabriela Sabatini	(Bulgaria) Manuela Maleeva-Fragnière (United States) Zina Garrison	(Italy) Raffaella Reggi (United States) Lori McNeil (Canada) Helen Kelesi (West Germany) Sylvia Hanika
4 Apr	Family Circle Cup; Hilton Head Island, United States; Category 5 Clay – $300,000 – 56S/28D/32Q; Singles – Doubles	(United States) Lori McNeil (United States) Martina Navratilova; 6–2, 2–6, 6–3	(West Germany) Claudia Kohde-Kilsch (Argentina) Gabriela Sabatini	(Bulgaria) Manuela Maleeva-Fragnière (United States) Zina Garrison	(Italy) Raffaella Reggi (United States) Lori McNeil (Canada) Helen Kelesi (West Germany) Sylvia Hanika
11 Apr	Bausch & Lomb Championships; Amelia Island, United States; Category 5 Clay – $300,000 – 56S/28D/32Q; Singles – Doubles	(United States) Martina Navratilova; 6–0, 6–2	(Argentina) Gabriela Sabatini	(West Germany) Steffi Graf (West Germany) Claudia Kohde-Kilsch	(Bulgaria) Katerina Maleeva (United States) Michelle Torres (United States) Zina Garrison (United States) Kathleen Horvath
11 Apr	Bausch & Lomb Championships; Amelia Island, United States; Category 5 Clay – $300,000 – 56S/28D/32Q; Singles – Doubles	(United States) Zina Garrison (West Germany) Eva Pfaff; 4–6, 6–2, 7–6^{(7–5)}	(United States) Katrina Adams (United States) Penny Barg	(West Germany) Steffi Graf (West Germany) Claudia Kohde-Kilsch	(Bulgaria) Katerina Maleeva (United States) Michelle Torres (United States) Zina Garrison (United States) Kathleen Horvath
11 Apr	Suntory Japan Open; Tokyo, Japan; Category 2 Hard – $100,000 – 32S/16D/32Q; Singles – Doubles	(United States) Patty Fendick; 6–3, 7–5	(United States) Stephanie Rehe	(United States) Marianne Werdel (Soviet Union) Leila Meskhi	(United Kingdom) Monique Javer (United States) Brenda Schultz (Australia) Anne Minter (Soviet Union) Larisa Savchenko
11 Apr	Suntory Japan Open; Tokyo, Japan; Category 2 Hard – $100,000 – 32S/16D/32Q; Singles – Doubles	(United States) Gigi Fernández (United States) Robin White; 6–1, 6–4	(United States) Lea Antonoplis (United States) Barbara Gerken	(United States) Marianne Werdel (Soviet Union) Leila Meskhi	(United Kingdom) Monique Javer (United States) Brenda Schultz (Australia) Anne Minter (Soviet Union) Larisa Savchenko
18 Apr	Virginia Slims of Houston; Houston, United States; Category 4 Clay – $250,000 – 32S/16D/32Q; Singles – Doubles	(United States) Chris Evert; 6–0, 6–4	(United States) Martina Navratilova	(United States) Elly Hakami (United States) Zina Garrison	(Spain) Arantxa Sánchez Vicario (Argentina) Patricia Tarabini (West Germany) Isabel Cueto (United States) Gretchen Magers
18 Apr	Virginia Slims of Houston; Houston, United States; Category 4 Clay – $250,000 – 32S/16D/32Q; Singles – Doubles	(United States) Katrina Adams (United States) Zina Garrison; 6–7^{(4–7)}, 6–2, 6–4	(United States) Martina Navratilova (United States) Lori McNeil	(United States) Elly Hakami (United States) Zina Garrison	(Spain) Arantxa Sánchez Vicario (Argentina) Patricia Tarabini (West Germany) Isabel Cueto (United States) Gretchen Magers
18 Apr	Taipei Women's Championship; Taipei, Taiwan; Category 1 Carpet (i) – $50,000 – 32S/16D; Singles – Doubles	(United States) Stephanie Rehe; 6–4, 6–4	(United States) Brenda Schultz	(Sweden) Catarina Lindqvist (United States) Patty Fendick	(Sweden) Jonna Jonerup (Australia) Belinda Cordwell (United States) Ann Henricksson (United States) Betsy Nagelsen
18 Apr	Taipei Women's Championship; Taipei, Taiwan; Category 1 Carpet (i) – $50,000 – 32S/16D; Singles – Doubles	(United States) Patty Fendick (United States) Ann Henricksson; 6–2, 2–6, 6–2	(Australia) Belinda Cordwell (Australia) Julie Richardson	(Sweden) Catarina Lindqvist (United States) Patty Fendick	(Sweden) Jonna Jonerup (Australia) Belinda Cordwell (United States) Ann Henricksson (United States) Betsy Nagelsen
18 Apr	Singapore Open; Singapore; Category 1 Hard – $50,000 – 32S/16D; Singles – Doubles	(United Kingdom) Monique Javer; 7–6^{(7–3)}, 6–3	(Soviet Union) Leila Meskhi	(Australia) Dianne Balestrat (Soviet Union) Natalia Egorova	(Netherlands) Carin Bakkum (Australia) Michelle Jaggard-Lai (Japan) Masako Yanagi (Australia) Anne Minter
18 Apr	Singapore Open; Singapore; Category 1 Hard – $50,000 – 32S/16D; Singles – Doubles	(Soviet Union) Natalia Bykova (Soviet Union) Natalia Medvedeva; 7–6^{(7–4)}, 6–3	(Soviet Union) Leila Meskhi (Soviet Union) Svetlana Parkhomenko	(Australia) Dianne Balestrat (Soviet Union) Natalia Egorova	(Netherlands) Carin Bakkum (Australia) Michelle Jaggard-Lai (Japan) Masako Yanagi (Australia) Anne Minter
25 Apr	Pan Pacific Open; Tokyo, Japan; Category 4 Carpet (i) – $250,000 – 28S/16D/32Q; Singles – Doubles	(United States) Pam Shriver; 7–5, 6–1	(Czechoslovakia) Helena Suková	(Soviet Union) Larisa Savchenko (Bulgaria) Manuela Maleeva-Fragnière	(United States) Peanut Louie-Harper (Soviet Union) Natasha Zvereva (Japan) Etsuko Inoue (Australia) Anne Minter
25 Apr	Pan Pacific Open; Tokyo, Japan; Category 4 Carpet (i) – $250,000 – 28S/16D/32Q; Singles – Doubles	(United States) Pam Shriver (Czechoslovakia) Helena Suková; 4–6, 6–2, 7–6^{(7–5)}	(United States) Gigi Fernández (United States) Robin White	(Soviet Union) Larisa Savchenko (Bulgaria) Manuela Maleeva-Fragnière	(United States) Peanut Louie-Harper (Soviet Union) Natasha Zvereva (Japan) Etsuko Inoue (Australia) Anne Minter
25 Apr	Citta de Taranto; Taranto, Italy; Category 1 Clay – $50,000 – 32S/16D/32Q; Singles – Doubles	(Canada) Helen Kelesi; 6–1, 6–0	(Italy) Laura Garrone	(West Germany) Veronika Martinek (Italy) Linda Ferrando	(Czechoslovakia) Radka Zrubáková (France) Alexia Dechaume (Czechoslovakia) Jana Pospíšilová (Italy) Laura Lapi
25 Apr	Citta de Taranto; Taranto, Italy; Category 1 Clay – $50,000 – 32S/16D/32Q; Singles – Doubles	(West Germany) Andrea Betzner (West Germany) Claudia Porwik; 6–1, 6–2	(Italy) Laura Garrone (Canada) Helen Kelesi	(West Germany) Veronika Martinek (Italy) Linda Ferrando	(Czechoslovakia) Radka Zrubáková (France) Alexia Dechaume (Czechoslovakia) Jana Pospíšilová (Italy) Laura Lapi
25 Apr	International Championships of Spain; Barcelona, Spain; Category 1 Clay – $50,000 – 32S/16D/32Q; Singles – Doubles	(Brazil) Neige Dias; 6–3, 6–3	(Argentina) Bettina Fulco	(Argentina) Mariana Pérez Roldán (Spain) Arantxa Sánchez Vicario	(West Germany) Sylvia Hanika (Belgium) Sandra Wasserman (Brazil) Pat Medrado (Italy) Barbara Romanò
25 Apr	International Championships of Spain; Barcelona, Spain; Category 1 Clay – $50,000 – 32S/16D/32Q; Singles – Doubles	(Czechoslovakia) Iva Budařová (Belgium) Sandra Wasserman; 1–6, 6–3, 6–2	(Sweden) Anna-Karin Olsson (Spain) María José Llorca	(Argentina) Mariana Pérez Roldán (Spain) Arantxa Sánchez Vicario	(West Germany) Sylvia Hanika (Belgium) Sandra Wasserman (Brazil) Pat Medrado (Italy) Barbara Romanò

=== May ===
Week	Tournament	Champions	Runners-up	Semifinalists	Quarterfinalists
2 May	Italian Open; Rome, Italy; Category 3 Clay – $200,000 – 56S/32D/32Q; Singles – Doubles	(Argentina) Gabriela Sabatini; 6–1, 6–7^{(4–7)}, 6–1	(Canada) Helen Kelesi	(Spain) Arantxa Sánchez Vicario (Austria) Judith Wiesner	(Italy) Raffaella Reggi (Argentina) Bettina Fulco (Italy) Sandra Cecchini (West Germany) Sylvia Hanika
2 May	Italian Open; Rome, Italy; Category 3 Clay – $200,000 – 56S/32D/32Q; Singles – Doubles	(Czechoslovakia) Jana Novotná (France) Catherine Suire; 6–3, 4–6, 7–5	(Australia) Jenny Byrne (Australia) Janine Tremelling	(Spain) Arantxa Sánchez Vicario (Austria) Judith Wiesner	(Italy) Raffaella Reggi (Argentina) Bettina Fulco (Italy) Sandra Cecchini (West Germany) Sylvia Hanika
9 May	German Open; West Berlin, West Germany; Category 5 (Tier I); Clay – $300,000 – 56S/28D/32Q; Singles – Doubles	(West Germany) Steffi Graf; 6–3, 6–2	(Czechoslovakia) Helena Suková	(West Germany) Claudia Kohde-Kilsch (West Germany) Sylvia Hanika	(Australia) Nicole Provis (Italy) Sandra Cecchini (Czechoslovakia) Radka Zrubáková (United States) Mary Joe Fernández
9 May	German Open; West Berlin, West Germany; Category 5 (Tier I); Clay – $300,000 – 56S/28D/32Q; Singles – Doubles	(France) Isabelle Demongeot (France) Nathalie Tauziat; 6–2, 4–6, 6–4	(West Germany) Claudia Kohde-Kilsch (Czechoslovakia) Helena Suková	(West Germany) Claudia Kohde-Kilsch (West Germany) Sylvia Hanika	(Australia) Nicole Provis (Italy) Sandra Cecchini (Czechoslovakia) Radka Zrubáková (United States) Mary Joe Fernández
16 May	European Open; Geneva, Switzerland; Category 2 Clay – $100,000 – 64S/32D/32Q; Singles – Doubles	(Austria) Barbara Paulus; 6–4, 5–7, 6–1	(United States) Lori McNeil	(France) Isabelle Demongeot (Argentina) Mariana Pérez Roldán	(Bulgaria) Manuela Maleeva-Fragnière (Czechoslovakia) Iva Budařová (Sweden) Catarina Lindqvist (Argentina) Mercedes Paz
16 May	European Open; Geneva, Switzerland; Category 2 Clay – $100,000 – 64S/32D/32Q; Singles – Doubles	(Switzerland) Christiane Jolissaint (South Africa) Dinky Van Rensburg; 6–1, 6–3	(Sweden) Maria Lindström (West Germany) Claudia Porwik	(France) Isabelle Demongeot (Argentina) Mariana Pérez Roldán	(Bulgaria) Manuela Maleeva-Fragnière (Czechoslovakia) Iva Budařová (Sweden) Catarina Lindqvist (Argentina) Mercedes Paz
16 May	Grand Prix de Strasbourg; Strasbourg, France; Category 2 Clay – $100,000 – 32S/16D/32Q; Singles – Doubles	(Italy) Sandra Cecchini; 6–3, 6–0	(Austria) Judith Wiesner	(Soviet Union) Natasha Zvereva (Australia) Nicole Provis	(United States) Kathleen Horvath (Argentina) Bettina Fulco (United States) Susan Sloane (Australia) Anne Minter
16 May	Grand Prix de Strasbourg; Strasbourg, France; Category 2 Clay – $100,000 – 32S/16D/32Q; Singles – Doubles	(Netherlands) Manon Bollegraf (Australia) Nicole Provis; 7–5, 6–7^{(11–13)}, 6–3	(Australia) Jenny Byrne (Australia) Janine Tremelling	(Soviet Union) Natasha Zvereva (Australia) Nicole Provis	(United States) Kathleen Horvath (Argentina) Bettina Fulco (United States) Susan Sloane (Australia) Anne Minter
23 May; 30 May	French Open; Paris, France; Grand Slam; Clay – $1,488,000 – 128S/64D/56X/64Q; Singles – Doubles – Mixed doubles	(West Germany) Steffi Graf; 6–0, 6–0	(Soviet Union) Natasha Zvereva	(Argentina) Gabriela Sabatini (Australia) Nicole Provis	(Argentina) Bettina Fulco (Canada) Helen Kelesi (Spain) Arantxa Sánchez Vicario (Czechoslovakia) Helena Suková
23 May; 30 May	French Open; Paris, France; Grand Slam; Clay – $1,488,000 – 128S/64D/56X/64Q; Singles – Doubles – Mixed doubles	(United States) Martina Navratilova (United States) Pam Shriver; 6–2, 7–5	(West Germany) Claudia Kohde-Kilsch (Czechoslovakia) Helena Suková	(Argentina) Gabriela Sabatini (Australia) Nicole Provis	(Argentina) Bettina Fulco (Canada) Helen Kelesi (Spain) Arantxa Sánchez Vicario (Czechoslovakia) Helena Suková
23 May; 30 May	French Open; Paris, France; Grand Slam; Clay – $1,488,000 – 128S/64D/56X/64Q; Singles – Doubles – Mixed doubles	(United States) Lori McNeil (Mexico) Jorge Lozano; 7–5, 6–2	(Netherlands) Brenda Schultz-McCarthy (Netherlands) Michiel Schapers	(Argentina) Gabriela Sabatini (Australia) Nicole Provis	(Argentina) Bettina Fulco (Canada) Helen Kelesi (Spain) Arantxa Sánchez Vicario (Czechoslovakia) Helena Suková

=== June ===
Week	Tournament	Champions	Runners-up	Semifinalists	Quarterfinalists
6 Jun	Dow Chemical Classic; Birmingham, Great Britain; Category 2 Grass – $150,000 – 56S/32D/32Q; Singles – Doubles	(West Germany) Claudia Kohde-Kilsch; 6–2, 6–1	(United States) Pam Shriver	(United States) Zina Garrison (United States) Lori McNeil	(South Africa) Rosalyn Fairbank (Australia) Anne Minter (South Africa) Elna Reinach (Australia) Belinda Cordwell
6 Jun	Dow Chemical Classic; Birmingham, Great Britain; Category 2 Grass – $150,000 – 56S/32D/32Q; Singles – Doubles	(Soviet Union) Larisa Savchenko (Soviet Union) Natasha Zvereva; 6–4, 6–1	(Soviet Union) Leila Meskhi (Soviet Union) Svetlana Parkhomenko	(United States) Zina Garrison (United States) Lori McNeil	(South Africa) Rosalyn Fairbank (Australia) Anne Minter (South Africa) Elna Reinach (Australia) Belinda Cordwell
13 Jun	Pilkington Championships; Eastbourne, Great Britain; Category 4 Grass – $250,000 – 64S/32D/32Q; Singles – Doubles	(United States) Martina Navratilova; 6–2, 6–2	(Soviet Union) Natasha Zvereva	(United States) Mary Joe Fernández (France) Pascale Paradis	(Soviet Union) Larisa Savchenko (Argentina) Gabriela Sabatini (Australia) Anne Minter (Sweden) Catarina Lindqvist
13 Jun	Pilkington Championships; Eastbourne, Great Britain; Category 4 Grass – $250,000 – 64S/32D/32Q; Singles – Doubles	(West Germany) Eva Pfaff (Australia) Elizabeth Smylie; 6–4, 7–6^{(8–6)}	(Australia) Belinda Cordwell (South Africa) Dinky Van Rensburg	(United States) Mary Joe Fernández (France) Pascale Paradis	(Soviet Union) Larisa Savchenko (Argentina) Gabriela Sabatini (Australia) Anne Minter (Sweden) Catarina Lindqvist
20 Jun; 27 Jun	Wimbledon Championships; London, Great Britain; Grand Slam; Grass – $1,717,085 – 128S/64D/64X/64Q; Singles – Doubles – Mixed doubles	(West Germany) Steffi Graf; 5–7, 6–2, 6–1	(United States) Martina Navratilova	(United States) Pam Shriver (United States) Chris Evert	(France) Pascale Paradis (United States) Zina Garrison (Czechoslovakia) Helena Suková (South Africa) Rosalyn Fairbank
20 Jun; 27 Jun	Wimbledon Championships; London, Great Britain; Grand Slam; Grass – $1,717,085 – 128S/64D/64X/64Q; Singles – Doubles – Mixed doubles	(West Germany) Steffi Graf (Argentina) Gabriela Sabatini; 6–3, 1–6, 12–10	(Soviet Union) Larisa Savchenko (Soviet Union) Natasha Zvereva	(United States) Pam Shriver (United States) Chris Evert	(France) Pascale Paradis (United States) Zina Garrison (Czechoslovakia) Helena Suková (South Africa) Rosalyn Fairbank
20 Jun; 27 Jun	Wimbledon Championships; London, Great Britain; Grand Slam; Grass – $1,717,085 – 128S/64D/64X/64Q; Singles – Doubles – Mixed doubles	(United States) Zina Garrison (United States) Sherwood Stewart; 6–1, 7–6^{(7–3)}	(United States) Gretchen Magers (United States) Kelly Jones	(United States) Pam Shriver (United States) Chris Evert	(France) Pascale Paradis (United States) Zina Garrison (Czechoslovakia) Helena Suková (South Africa) Rosalyn Fairbank

=== July ===
Week	Tournament	Champions	Runners-up	Semifinalists	Quarterfinalists
4 Jul	Volvo Ladies Open; Båstad, Sweden; Category 1 Clay – $75,000 – 32S/16D/32Q; Singles – Doubles	(West Germany) Isabel Cueto; 7–5, 6–1	(Italy) Sandra Cecchini	(Brazil) Neige Dias (Belgium) Sandra Wasserman	(Argentina) Mercedes Paz (Italy) Laura Lapi (Sweden) Cecilia Dahlman (United States) Gretchen Magers
4 Jul	Volvo Ladies Open; Båstad, Sweden; Category 1 Clay – $75,000 – 32S/16D/32Q; Singles – Doubles	(Italy) Sandra Cecchini (Argentina) Mercedes Paz; 6–0, 6–2	(Italy) Linda Ferrando (Italy) Silvia La Fratta	(Brazil) Neige Dias (Belgium) Sandra Wasserman	(Argentina) Mercedes Paz (Italy) Laura Lapi (Sweden) Cecilia Dahlman (United States) Gretchen Magers
11 Jul	Virginia Slims of Newport; Newport, United States; Category 3 Grass – $200,000 – 32S/16D/32Q; Singles – Doubles	(United States) Lori McNeil; 6–4, 4–6, 6–3	(United States) Barbara Potter	(United States) Pam Shriver (South Africa) Rosalyn Fairbank	(United States) Wendy White (United States) Robin White (United States) Lea Antonoplis (United States) Ann Henricksson
11 Jul	Virginia Slims of Newport; Newport, United States; Category 3 Grass – $200,000 – 32S/16D/32Q; Singles – Doubles	(South Africa) Rosalyn Fairbank (United States) Barbara Potter; 6–4, 6–3	(United States) Gigi Fernández (United States) Lori McNeil	(United States) Pam Shriver (South Africa) Rosalyn Fairbank	(United States) Wendy White (United States) Robin White (United States) Lea Antonoplis (United States) Ann Henricksson
11 Jul	WTA Nice Open; Nice, France; Category 2 Clay – $100,000 – 32S/16D/32Q; Singles – Doubles	(Italy) Sandra Cecchini; 7–5, 6–4	(France) Nathalie Tauziat	(Argentina) Bettina Fulco (France) Isabelle Demongeot	(West Germany) Silke Frankl (Argentina) Patricia Tarabini (Italy) Laura Garrone (Austria) Barbara Paulus
11 Jul	WTA Nice Open; Nice, France; Category 2 Clay – $100,000 – 32S/16D/32Q; Singles – Doubles	(France) Catherine Suire (France) Catherine Tanvier; 6–4, 4–6, 6–2	(France) Isabelle Demongeot (France) Nathalie Tauziat	(Argentina) Bettina Fulco (France) Isabelle Demongeot	(West Germany) Silke Frankl (Argentina) Patricia Tarabini (Italy) Laura Garrone (Austria) Barbara Paulus
11 Jul	Belgian Ladies Open; Brussels, Belgium; Category 1 Clay – $75,000 – 32S/16D/32Q; Singles – Doubles	(Spain) Arantxa Sánchez Vicario; 6–0, 7–5	(Italy) Raffaella Reggi	(West Germany) Isabel Cueto (Greece) Angeliki Kanellopoulou	(United States) Zina Garrison (Argentina) Mercedes Paz (Italy) Silvia La Fratta (Brazil) Neige Dias
11 Jul	Belgian Ladies Open; Brussels, Belgium; Category 1 Clay – $75,000 – 32S/16D/32Q; Singles – Doubles	(Argentina) Mercedes Paz (Denmark) Tine Scheuer-Larsen; 7–6^{(7–3)}, 6–1	(Bulgaria) Katerina Maleeva (Italy) Raffaella Reggi	(West Germany) Isabel Cueto (Greece) Angeliki Kanellopoulou	(United States) Zina Garrison (Argentina) Mercedes Paz (Italy) Silvia La Fratta (Brazil) Neige Dias
18 Jul	WTA Aix-en-Provence Open; Aix-en-Provence, France; Category 2 Clay – $100,000 – 32S/16D/32Q; Singles – Doubles	(Austria) Judith Wiesner; 6–1, 6–2	(West Germany) Sylvia Hanika	(Argentina) Bettina Fulco (Italy) Sandra Cecchini	(France) Nathalie Guerrée (Czechoslovakia) Iva Budařová (Brazil) Neige Dias (Spain) Conchita Martínez
18 Jul	WTA Aix-en-Provence Open; Aix-en-Provence, France; Category 2 Clay – $100,000 – 32S/16D/32Q; Singles – Doubles	(France) Nathalie Herreman (France) Catherine Tanvier; 6–4, 7–5	(Italy) Sandra Cecchini (Spain) Arantxa Sánchez Vicario	(Argentina) Bettina Fulco (Italy) Sandra Cecchini	(France) Nathalie Guerrée (Czechoslovakia) Iva Budařová (Brazil) Neige Dias (Spain) Conchita Martínez
18 Jul	OTB Open; Schenectady, United States; Category 1 Hard – $50,000 – 32S/16D/32Q; Singles – Doubles	(United States) Gretchen Magers; 7–6^{(7–3)}, 6–4	(United States) Terry Phelps	(United States) Camille Benjamin (United States) Stacey Martin	(United States) Elly Hakami (United States) Ronni Reis (United States) Carrie Cunningham (Japan) Akemi Nishiya
18 Jul	OTB Open; Schenectady, United States; Category 1 Hard – $50,000 – 32S/16D/32Q; Singles – Doubles	(United States) Ann Henricksson (Australia) Julie Richardson; 6–3, 3–6, 7–5	(United States) Lea Antonoplis (United States) Cammy MacGregor	(United States) Camille Benjamin (United States) Stacey Martin	(United States) Elly Hakami (United States) Ronni Reis (United States) Carrie Cunningham (Japan) Akemi Nishiya
25 Jul	Northern California Open; Aptos, California, United States; Category 1 Hard – $50,000 – 32S/16D/32Q; Singles – Doubles	(United Kingdom) Sara Gomer; 6–4, 7–5	(United States) Robin White	(United States) Patty Fendick (United States) Stephanie Rehe	(United States) Anne Smith (United Kingdom) Jo Durie (United States) Ann Grossman (United States) Gretchen Magers
25 Jul	Northern California Open; Aptos, California, United States; Category 1 Hard – $50,000 – 32S/16D/32Q; Singles – Doubles	(South Africa) Lise Gregory (United States) Ronni Reis; 6–3, 6–4	(United States) Patty Fendick (Canada) Jill Hetherington	(United States) Patty Fendick (United States) Stephanie Rehe	(United States) Anne Smith (United Kingdom) Jo Durie (United States) Ann Grossman (United States) Gretchen Magers
25 Jul	Citizen Cup; Hamburg, West Germany; Category 3 Clay – $200,000 – 56S/28D/32Q; Singles – Doubles	(West Germany) Steffi Graf; 6–4, 6–2	(Bulgaria) Katerina Maleeva	(Argentina) Bettina Fulco (Czechoslovakia) Radka Zrubáková	(Italy) Raffaella Reggi (Italy) Sandra Cecchini (West Germany) Silke Meier (West Germany) Isabel Cueto
25 Jul	Citizen Cup; Hamburg, West Germany; Category 3 Clay – $200,000 – 56S/28D/32Q; Singles – Doubles	(Czechoslovakia) Jana Novotná (Denmark) Tine Scheuer-Larsen; 6–4, 6–2	(West Germany) Andrea Betzner (Austria) Judith Wiesner	(Argentina) Bettina Fulco (Czechoslovakia) Radka Zrubáková	(Italy) Raffaella Reggi (Italy) Sandra Cecchini (West Germany) Silke Meier (West Germany) Isabel Cueto

=== August ===
Week	Tournament	Champions	Runners-up	Semifinalists	Quarterfinalists
1 Aug	Pringles Light Classic; Mason, United States; Category 4 Hard – $250,000 – 32S/16D/32Q; Singles – Doubles	(United States) Barbara Potter; 6–2, 6–2	(Canada) Helen Kelesi	(Bulgaria) Manuela Maleeva-Fragnière (United States) Halle Cioffi	(United States) Kathy Rinaldi (United States) Susan Sloane (United States) Peanut Louie-Harper (United States) Beth Herr
1 Aug	Pringles Light Classic; Mason, United States; Category 4 Hard – $250,000 – 32S/16D/32Q; Singles – Doubles	(United States) Beth Herr (United States) Candy Reynolds; 4–6, 7–6^{(11–9)}, 6–1	(United States) Lindsay Bartlett (Canada) Helen Kelesi	(Bulgaria) Manuela Maleeva-Fragnière (United States) Halle Cioffi	(United States) Kathy Rinaldi (United States) Susan Sloane (United States) Peanut Louie-Harper (United States) Beth Herr
1 Aug	Virginia Slims of San Diego; San Diego, United States; Category 2 Hard – $100,000 – 32S/16D/32Q; Singles – Doubles	(United States) Stephanie Rehe; 6–1, 6–1	(United States) Ann Grossman	(South Africa) Rosalyn Fairbank (United States) Deborah Graham	(United States) Jennifer Santrock (United Kingdom) Jo Durie (United States) Lisa Bonder (United States) Gretchen Magers
1 Aug	Virginia Slims of San Diego; San Diego, United States; Category 2 Hard – $100,000 – 32S/16D/32Q; Singles – Doubles	(United States) Patty Fendick (Canada) Jill Hetherington; 7–6^{(12–10)}, 6–4	(United States) Betsy Nagelsen (South Africa) Dianne Van Rensburg	(South Africa) Rosalyn Fairbank (United States) Deborah Graham	(United States) Jennifer Santrock (United Kingdom) Jo Durie (United States) Lisa Bonder (United States) Gretchen Magers
1 Aug	Athens Trophy; Athens, Greece; Category 1 Clay – $75,000 – 32S/16D/32Q; Singles – Doubles	(West Germany) Isabel Cueto; 6–0, 6–1	(Italy) Laura Golarsa	(Austria) Barbara Paulus (Czechoslovakia) Leona Lásková	(Greece) Angeliki Kanellopoulou (West Germany) Silke Frankl (West Germany) Sabine Hack (Austria) Judith Wiesner
1 Aug	Athens Trophy; Athens, Greece; Category 1 Clay – $75,000 – 32S/16D/32Q; Singles – Doubles	(Socialist Federal Republic of Yugoslavia) Sabrina Goleš (Austria) Judith Wiesner; 7–5, 6–0	(West Germany) Silke Frankl (West Germany) Sabine Hack	(Austria) Barbara Paulus (Czechoslovakia) Leona Lásková	(Greece) Angeliki Kanellopoulou (West Germany) Silke Frankl (West Germany) Sabine Hack (Austria) Judith Wiesner
8 Aug	Virginia Slims of Los Angeles; Los Angeles, United States; Category 5 Hard – $300,000 – 56S/28D/32Q; Singles – Doubles	(United States) Chris Evert; 2–6, 6–1, 6–1	(Argentina) Gabriela Sabatini	(United States) Stephanie Rehe (United States) Zina Garrison	(United States) Patty Fendick (United States) Lori McNeil (Australia) Anne Minter (United States) Amy Frazier
8 Aug	Virginia Slims of Los Angeles; Los Angeles, United States; Category 5 Hard – $300,000 – 56S/28D/32Q; Singles – Doubles	(United States) Patty Fendick (Canada) Jill Hetherington; 7–6^{(7–2)}, 5–7, 6–4	(United States) Gigi Fernández (United States) Robin White	(United States) Stephanie Rehe (United States) Zina Garrison	(United States) Patty Fendick (United States) Lori McNeil (Australia) Anne Minter (United States) Amy Frazier
8 Aug	Sofia Open; Sofia, Bulgaria; Category 2 Clay – $100,000 – 32S/16D/32Q; Singles – Doubles	(Spain) Conchita Martínez; 6–1, 6–2	(Austria) Barbara Paulus	(Bulgaria) Katerina Maleeva (Belgium) Ann Devries	(Czechoslovakia) Iva Budařová (Socialist Federal Republic of Yugoslavia) Sabrina Goleš (Czechoslovakia) Hana Fukárková (Belgium) Sandra Wasserman
8 Aug	Sofia Open; Sofia, Bulgaria; Category 2 Clay – $100,000 – 32S/16D/32Q; Singles – Doubles	(Spain) Conchita Martínez (Austria) Barbara Paulus; 1–6, 6–1, 6–4	(Socialist Federal Republic of Yugoslavia) Sabrina Goleš (Bulgaria) Katerina Maleeva	(Bulgaria) Katerina Maleeva (Belgium) Ann Devries	(Czechoslovakia) Iva Budařová (Socialist Federal Republic of Yugoslavia) Sabrina Goleš (Czechoslovakia) Hana Fukárková (Belgium) Sandra Wasserman
15 Aug	Canadian Open; Montreal, Canada; Category 5 Hard – $300,000 – 56S/32D/32Q; Singles – Doubles	(Argentina) Gabriela Sabatini; 6–1, 6–2	(Soviet Union) Natasha Zvereva	(United States) Pam Shriver (United States) Chris Evert	(United States) Martina Navratilova (United States) Terry Phelps (United States) Lori McNeil (Czechoslovakia) Helena Suková
15 Aug	Canadian Open; Montreal, Canada; Category 5 Hard – $300,000 – 56S/32D/32Q; Singles – Doubles	(Czechoslovakia) Jana Novotná (Czechoslovakia) Helena Suková; 7–6^{(7–2)}, 7–6^{(8–6)}	(United States) Zina Garrison (United States) Pam Shriver	(United States) Pam Shriver (United States) Chris Evert	(United States) Martina Navratilova (United States) Terry Phelps (United States) Lori McNeil (Czechoslovakia) Helena Suková
22 Aug	United Jersey Bank Classic; Mahwah, United States; Category 3 Hard – $200,000 – 28S/16D/48Q; Singles – Doubles	(West Germany) Steffi Graf; 6–0, 6–1	(France) Nathalie Tauziat	(Bulgaria) Katerina Maleeva (Czechoslovakia) Helena Suková	(West Germany) Sylvia Hanika (United States) Stephanie Rehe (Soviet Union) Natasha Zvereva (Sweden) Catarina Lindqvist
22 Aug	United Jersey Bank Classic; Mahwah, United States; Category 3 Hard – $200,000 – 28S/16D/48Q; Singles – Doubles	(Czechoslovakia) Jana Novotná (Czechoslovakia) Helena Suková; 6–3, 6–2	(United States) Gigi Fernández (United States) Robin White	(Bulgaria) Katerina Maleeva (Czechoslovakia) Helena Suková	(West Germany) Sylvia Hanika (United States) Stephanie Rehe (Soviet Union) Natasha Zvereva (Sweden) Catarina Lindqvist
29 Aug; 5 Sep	US Open; New York City, United States; Grand Slam; Hard – $1,937,333 – 128S/64D/32X/64Q; Singles – Doubles – Mixed doubles	(West Germany) Steffi Graf; 6–3, 3–6, 6–1	(Argentina) Gabriela Sabatini	(United States) Chris Evert (United States) Zina Garrison	(Bulgaria) Katerina Maleeva (Bulgaria) Manuela Maleeva-Fragnière (Soviet Union) Larisa Savchenko (United States) Martina Navratilova
29 Aug; 5 Sep	US Open; New York City, United States; Grand Slam; Hard – $1,937,333 – 128S/64D/32X/64Q; Singles – Doubles – Mixed doubles	(United States) Gigi Fernández (United States) Robin White; 6–4, 6–1	(United States) Patty Fendick (Canada) Jill Hetherington	(United States) Chris Evert (United States) Zina Garrison	(Bulgaria) Katerina Maleeva (Bulgaria) Manuela Maleeva-Fragnière (Soviet Union) Larisa Savchenko (United States) Martina Navratilova
29 Aug; 5 Sep	US Open; New York City, United States; Grand Slam; Hard – $1,937,333 – 128S/64D/32X/64Q; Singles – Doubles – Mixed doubles	(Czechoslovakia) Jana Novotná (United States) Jim Pugh; 7–5, 6–3	(Australia) Elizabeth Smylie (United States) Patrick McEnroe	(United States) Chris Evert (United States) Zina Garrison	(Bulgaria) Katerina Maleeva (Bulgaria) Manuela Maleeva-Fragnière (Soviet Union) Larisa Savchenko (United States) Martina Navratilova

=== September ===
Week	Tournament	Champions	Runners-up	Semifinalists	Quarterfinalists
12 Sep	Virginia Slims of Arizona; Phoenix, United States; Category 2 Hard (i) – $100,000 – 32S/16D/32Q; Singles – Doubles	(Bulgaria) Manuela Maleeva-Fragnière; 6–3, 4–6, 6–2	(South Africa) Dinky Van Rensburg	(United States) Elise Burgin (United States) Susan Sloane	(United States) Terry Phelps (South Africa) Rosalyn Fairbank (United States) Wendy White (United States) Elly Hakami
12 Sep	Virginia Slims of Arizona; Phoenix, United States; Category 2 Hard (i) – $100,000 – 32S/16D/32Q; Singles – Doubles	(United States) Elise Burgin (South Africa) Rosalyn Fairbank; 6–7^{(6–8)}, 7–6^{(7–3)}, 7–6^{(10–8)}	(United States) Beth Herr (United States) Terry Phelps	(United States) Elise Burgin (United States) Susan Sloane	(United States) Terry Phelps (South Africa) Rosalyn Fairbank (United States) Wendy White (United States) Elly Hakami
19 Sep	Open Clarins; Paris, France; Category 1 Clay – $50,000 – 32S/16D/32Q; Singles – Doubles	(Czechoslovakia) Petra Langrová; 7–6^{(7–0)}, 6–2	(Belgium) Sandra Wasserman	(Italy) Laura Lapi (Italy) Cathy Caverzasio	(Czechoslovakia) Jana Pospíšilová (France) Marie-Christine Damas (Italy) Laura Garrone (West Germany) Sabine Hack
19 Sep	Open Clarins; Paris, France; Category 1 Clay – $50,000 – 32S/16D/32Q; Singles – Doubles	(France) Alexia Dechaume (France) Emmanuelle Derly; 6–0, 6–2	(Australia) Louise Field (France) Nathalie Herreman	(Italy) Laura Lapi (Italy) Cathy Caverzasio	(Czechoslovakia) Jana Pospíšilová (France) Marie-Christine Damas (Italy) Laura Garrone (West Germany) Sabine Hack
19 Sep; 26 Sep	Summer Olympic Games; Seoul, South Korea; Summer Olympic Games; Hard; 48S/14D; Singles – Doubles	Gold	Silver	Bronze	(Soviet Union) Larisa Savchenko (United States) Pam Shriver (Soviet Union) Natasha Zvereva (Italy) Raffaella Reggi
19 Sep; 26 Sep	Summer Olympic Games; Seoul, South Korea; Summer Olympic Games; Hard; 48S/14D; Singles – Doubles	(West Germany) Steffi Graf; 6–3, 6–3	(Argentina) Gabriela Sabatini	(United States) Zina Garrison (Bulgaria) Manuela Maleeva-Fragnière	(Soviet Union) Larisa Savchenko (United States) Pam Shriver (Soviet Union) Natasha Zvereva (Italy) Raffaella Reggi
19 Sep; 26 Sep	Summer Olympic Games; Seoul, South Korea; Summer Olympic Games; Hard; 48S/14D; Singles – Doubles	(United States) Zina Garrison (United States) Pam Shriver; 4–6, 6–2, 10–8	(Czechoslovakia) Jana Novotná (Czechoslovakia) Helena Suková	(Australia) Elizabeth Smylie (Australia) Wendy Turnbull (West Germany) Steffi Graf (West Germany) Claudia Kohde-Kilsch	(Soviet Union) Larisa Savchenko (United States) Pam Shriver (Soviet Union) Natasha Zvereva (Italy) Raffaella Reggi

=== October ===
Week	Tournament	Champions	Runners-up	Semifinalists	Quarterfinalists
3 Oct	Virginia Slims of New Orleans; New Orleans, United States; Category 4 Carpet (i) – $250,000 – 32S/16D/32Q; Singles – Doubles	(United States) Chris Evert; 6–4, 6–1	(United States) Anne Smith	(United States) Stephanie Rehe (Socialist Federal Republic of Yugoslavia) Monica Seles	(United States) Susan Sloane (United States) Robin White (United States) Lori McNeil (United States) Barbara Potter
3 Oct	Virginia Slims of New Orleans; New Orleans, United States; Category 4 Carpet (i) – $250,000 – 32S/16D/32Q; Singles – Doubles	(United States) Beth Herr (United States) Candy Reynolds; 6–4, 6–4	(United States) Lori McNeil (United States) Betsy Nagelsen	(United States) Stephanie Rehe (Socialist Federal Republic of Yugoslavia) Monica Seles	(United States) Susan Sloane (United States) Robin White (United States) Lori McNeil (United States) Barbara Potter
10 Oct	Porsche Tennis Grand Prix; Filderstadt, West Germany; Category 4 Carpet (i) – $250,000 – 32S/16D/32Q; Singles – Doubles	(United States) Martina Navratilova; 6–2, 6–3	(United States) Chris Evert	(West Germany) Eva Pfaff (Italy) Raffaella Reggi	(Czechoslovakia) Radka Zrubáková (South Africa) Elna Reinach (France) Nathalie Tauziat (West Germany) Sylvia Hanika
10 Oct	Porsche Tennis Grand Prix; Filderstadt, West Germany; Category 4 Carpet (i) – $250,000 – 32S/16D/32Q; Singles – Doubles	(Poland) Iwona Kuczyńska (United States) Martina Navratilova; 6–1, 6–4	(Italy) Raffaella Reggi (South Africa) Elna Reinach	(West Germany) Eva Pfaff (Italy) Raffaella Reggi	(Czechoslovakia) Radka Zrubáková (South Africa) Elna Reinach (France) Nathalie Tauziat (West Germany) Sylvia Hanika
10 Oct	Honda Classic; San Juan, Puerto Rico; Category 1 Hard – $75,000 – 56S/28D/32Q; Singles – Doubles	(Australia) Anne Minter; 2–6, 6–4, 6–3	(Argentina) Mercedes Paz	(United States) Gigi Fernández (Brazil) Neige Dias	(United States) Stephanie Rehe (United States) Gretchen Magers (Australia) Michelle Jaggard (United States) Camille Benjamin
10 Oct	Honda Classic; San Juan, Puerto Rico; Category 1 Hard – $75,000 – 56S/28D/32Q; Singles – Doubles	(United States) Patty Fendick (Canada) Jill Hetherington; 6–4, 6–2	(United States) Gigi Fernández (United States) Robin White	(United States) Gigi Fernández (Brazil) Neige Dias	(United States) Stephanie Rehe (United States) Gretchen Magers (Australia) Michelle Jaggard (United States) Camille Benjamin
17 Oct	European Indoors; Zürich, Switzerland; Category 3 Carpet (i) – $200,000 – 32S/16D/32Q; Singles – Doubles	(United States) Pam Shriver; 6–3, 6–4	(Bulgaria) Manuela Maleeva-Fragnière	(West Germany) Claudia Kohde-Kilsch (Spain) Conchita Martínez	(United States) Brenda Schultz (Italy) Raffaella Reggi (Bulgaria) Katerina Maleeva (Czechoslovakia) Jana Pospíšilová
17 Oct	European Indoors; Zürich, Switzerland; Category 3 Carpet (i) – $200,000 – 32S/16D/32Q; Singles – Doubles	(France) Isabelle Demongeot (France) Nathalie Tauziat; 6–3, 6–3	(West Germany) Claudia Kohde-Kilsch (Czechoslovakia) Helena Suková	(West Germany) Claudia Kohde-Kilsch (Spain) Conchita Martínez	(United States) Brenda Schultz (Italy) Raffaella Reggi (Bulgaria) Katerina Maleeva (Czechoslovakia) Jana Pospíšilová
17 Oct	Virginia Slims of Nashville; Nashville, United States; Category 2 Hard – $100,000 – 56S/28D/32Q; Singles – Doubles	(United States) Susan Sloane; 6–3, 6–2	(United States) Beverly Bowes	(Soviet Union) Leila Meskhi (United States) Lori McNeil	(United States) Barbara Potter (United States) Halle Cioffi (Canada) Helen Kelesi (United States) Ann Grossman
17 Oct	Virginia Slims of Nashville; Nashville, United States; Category 2 Hard – $100,000 – 56S/28D/32Q; Singles – Doubles	(Australia) Jenny Byrne (Australia) Janine Thompson; 7–5, 6–7^{(1–7)}, 6–4	(United States) Elise Burgin (South Africa) Rosalyn Fairbank	(Soviet Union) Leila Meskhi (United States) Lori McNeil	(United States) Barbara Potter (United States) Halle Cioffi (Canada) Helen Kelesi (United States) Ann Grossman
24 Oct	Midland Group Championships; Brighton, Great Britain; Category 4 Carpet (i) – $250,000 – 32S/16D/32Q; Singles – Doubles	(West Germany) Steffi Graf; 6–2, 6–0	(Bulgaria) Manuela Maleeva-Fragnière	(United States) Lori McNeil (United States) Pam Shriver	(France) Nathalie Tauziat (West Germany) Claudia Kohde-Kilsch (Italy) Sandra Cecchini (West Germany) Sylvia Hanika
24 Oct	Midland Group Championships; Brighton, Great Britain; Category 4 Carpet (i) – $250,000 – 32S/16D/32Q; Singles – Doubles	(United States) Lori McNeil (United States) Betsy Nagelsen; 7–6^{(7–5)}, 2–6, 7–6^{(7–3)}	(France) Isabelle Demongeot (France) Nathalie Tauziat	(United States) Lori McNeil (United States) Pam Shriver	(France) Nathalie Tauziat (West Germany) Claudia Kohde-Kilsch (Italy) Sandra Cecchini (West Germany) Sylvia Hanika
24 Oct	Virginia Slims of Indianapolis; Indianapolis, United States; Category 2 Hard – $100,000 – 32S/16D/32Q; Singles – Doubles	(Bulgaria) Katerina Maleeva; 6–3, 2–6, 6–2	(United States) Zina Garrison	(United States) Louise Allen (United States) Stephanie Rehe	(United States) Hu Na (United States) Stacey Martin (United States) Gretchen Magers (United States) Amy Frazier
24 Oct	Virginia Slims of Indianapolis; Indianapolis, United States; Category 2 Hard – $100,000 – 32S/16D/32Q; Singles – Doubles	(Soviet Union) Larisa Savchenko (Soviet Union) Natasha Zvereva; 6–2, 6–1	(United States) Katrina Adams (United States) Zina Garrison	(United States) Louise Allen (United States) Stephanie Rehe	(United States) Hu Na (United States) Stacey Martin (United States) Gretchen Magers (United States) Amy Frazier
31 Oct	Virginia Slims of New England; Worcester, United States; Category 5 Hard (i) – $300,000 – 32S/16D/32Q; Singles – Doubles	(United States) Martina Navratilova; 6–7^{(4–7)}, 6–4, 6–3	(Soviet Union) Natasha Zvereva	(Argentina) Gabriela Sabatini (United States) Chris Evert	(Czechoslovakia) Helena Suková (Canada) Helen Kelesi (United States) Stephanie Rehe (United States) Barbara Potter
31 Oct	Virginia Slims of New England; Worcester, United States; Category 5 Hard (i) – $300,000 – 32S/16D/32Q; Singles – Doubles	(United States) Martina Navratilova (United States) Pam Shriver; 6–3, 3–6, 7–5	(Argentina) Gabriela Sabatini (Czechoslovakia) Helena Suková	(Argentina) Gabriela Sabatini (United States) Chris Evert	(Czechoslovakia) Helena Suková (Canada) Helen Kelesi (United States) Stephanie Rehe (United States) Barbara Potter

=== November ===
Week	Tournament	Champions	Runners-up	Semifinalists	Quarterfinalists
7 Nov	Virginia Slims of Chicago; Chicago, United States; Category 4 Carpet (i) – $250,000 – 28S/16D/32Q; Singles – Doubles	(United States) Martina Navratilova; 6–2, 6–2	(United States) Chris Evert	(Czechoslovakia) Helena Suková (Bulgaria) Manuela Maleeva-Fragnière	(United States) Zina Garrison (Argentina) Gabriela Sabatini (United States) Ann Grossman (South Africa) Rosalyn Fairbank
7 Nov	Virginia Slims of Chicago; Chicago, United States; Category 4 Carpet (i) – $250,000 – 28S/16D/32Q; Singles – Doubles	(United States) Lori McNeil (United States) Betsy Nagelsen; 6–4, 3–6, 6–4	(Soviet Union) Larisa Savchenko (Soviet Union) Natasha Zvereva	(Czechoslovakia) Helena Suková (Bulgaria) Manuela Maleeva-Fragnière	(United States) Zina Garrison (Argentina) Gabriela Sabatini (United States) Ann Grossman (South Africa) Rosalyn Fairbank
7 Nov	Rainha Cup; Guarujá, Brazil; Category 1 Hard – $50,000 – 32S/32Q/16D; Singles – Doubles	(Argentina) Mercedes Paz; 7–5, 6–2	(Canada) Rene Simpson	(Peru) Pilar Vásquez (Brazil) Andrea Vieira	(Argentina) Bettina Fulco (United States) Donna Faber (Brazil) Gisele Miró (Brazil) Neige Dias
7 Nov	Rainha Cup; Guarujá, Brazil; Category 1 Hard – $50,000 – 32S/32Q/16D; Singles – Doubles	(Argentina) Bettina Fulco (Argentina) Mercedes Paz; 6–3, 6–4	(Netherlands) Carin Bakkum (Netherlands) Simone Schilder	(Peru) Pilar Vásquez (Brazil) Andrea Vieira	(Argentina) Bettina Fulco (United States) Donna Faber (Brazil) Gisele Miró (Brazil) Neige Dias
14 Nov	Virginia Slims Championships; New York City, United States; Year-End Championship; Carpet (i) – $1,000,000 – 16S/8D; Singles – Doubles	(Argentina) Gabriela Sabatini; 7–5, 6–2, 6–2	(United States) Pam Shriver	(West Germany) Steffi Graf (Czechoslovakia) Helena Suková	(Bulgaria) Manuela Maleeva-Fragnière (United States) Chris Evert (Soviet Union) Natasha Zvereva (United States) Martina Navratilova
14 Nov	Virginia Slims Championships; New York City, United States; Year-End Championship; Carpet (i) – $1,000,000 – 16S/8D; Singles – Doubles	(United States) Martina Navratilova (United States) Pam Shriver; 6–3, 6–4	(Soviet Union) Larisa Savchenko (Soviet Union) Natasha Zvereva	(West Germany) Steffi Graf (Czechoslovakia) Helena Suková	(Bulgaria) Manuela Maleeva-Fragnière (United States) Chris Evert (Soviet Union) Natasha Zvereva (United States) Martina Navratilova
21 Nov	Bridgestone Doubles Championships; Tokyo, Japan; Carpet (i) – $250,000 – 8D; Doubles	(United States) Katrina Adams (United States) Zina Garrison; 7–5, 7–5	(United States) Gigi Fernández (United States) Robin White	(United States) Fendick / (Canada) Hetherington (West Germany) Pfaff / (Australia) Smylie	(United States) Smith / (Australia) Tremelling (Bulgaria) Maleeva / (Bulgaria) Maleeva-Fragnière (United States) Herr / (United States) Reynolds (United States) McNeil / (United States) Nagelsen

=== December ===
Week	Tournament	Champions	Runners-up	Semifinalists	Quarterfinalists
5 Dec	Fed Cup; Melbourne, Australia; Team; Hard	Czechoslovakia; 2–1	Soviet Union	West Germany; Canada	Australia; Spain; Denmark; Sweden

== Statistical Information ==
=== Titles won by player ===
These tables present the number of singles (S), doubles (D), and mixed doubles (X) titles won by each player and each nation during the season, within all the tournament categories of the 1988 WTA Tour: the Grand Slam tournaments, the Year-end championships and regular WTA tour events. The players/nations are sorted by:

1. total number of titles (a doubles title won by two players representing the same nation counts as only one win for the nation);
2. highest amount of highest category tournaments (for example, having a single Grand Slam gives preference over any kind of combination without a Grand Slam title);
3. a singles > doubles > mixed doubles hierarchy;
4. alphabetical order (by family names for players).

Total titles	Player	Grand Slam tournaments			Year-end championships		Regular tournaments		All titles		
Total titles	Player	Singles	Doubles	Mixed	Singles	Doubles	Singles	Doubles	Singles	Doubles	Mixed

=== Titles won by nation ===
Total titles	Country	Grand Slam tournaments			Year-end championships		Regular tournaments		All titles		
Total titles	Country	Singles	Doubles	Mixed	Singles	Doubles	Singles	Doubles	Singles	Doubles	Mixed

== Rankings ==
Below are the 1988 WTA year-end rankings (December 19, 1988) in both singles and doubles competition:

Singles Year-end Ranking
No	Player Name	Points	1987	Change
1	Steffi Graf (FRG)	325.7833	1	=
2	Martina Navratilova (USA)	211.8887	2	=
3	Chris Evert (USA)	161.8657	3	=
4	Gabriela Sabatini (ARG)	145.2492	6	+2
5	Pam Shriver (USA)	120.6795	4	-1
6	Manuela Maleeva-Fragnière (BUL)	82.6617	8	+2
7	Natasha Zvereva (URS)	82.5276	19	+12
8	Helena Suková (TCH)	80.2134	7	-1
9	Zina Garrison (USA)	68.3145	9	=
10	Barbara Potter (USA)	60.4733	12	+2
11	Katerina Maleeva (BUL)	58.1541	13	+2
12	Claudia Kohde-Kilsch (FRG)	57.1342	10	-2
13	Lori McNeil (USA)	54.5813	11	-2
14	Stephanie Rehe (USA)	47.6667	28	+14
15	Mary Joe Fernández (USA)	46.7500	20	+5
16	Larisa Savchenko (URS)	45.2000	24	+8
17	Sylvia Hanika (FRG)	43.1330	14	-3
18	Arantxa Sánchez Vicario (ESP)	42.7813	54	+36
19	Helen Kelesi (CAN)	40.6579	32	+13
20	Pascale Paradis (FRA)	38.2083	103	+83

Doubles Year-end Ranking
No	Player Name	Points	1987	Change
1	Martina Navratilova (USA)	447.7693	1	=
2	Pam Shriver (USA)	387.3688	2	=
3	Gabriela Sabatini (ARG)	278.7871	5	+2
4	Helena Suková (TCH)	250.3829	6	+2
5	Steffi Graf (FRG)	217.3968	13	+8
6	Gigi Fernández (USA)	214.0572	20	+14
7	Zina Garrison (USA)	211.8664	7	=
8	Claudia Kohde-Kilsch (FRG)	202.8296	3	-5
9	Larisa Savchenko (URS)	196.0084	11	+2
10	Lori McNeil (USA)	190.2514	4	-6
11	Natasha Zvereva (URS)	177.0948	94	+83
12	Betsy Nagelsen (USA)	168.0760	14	+2
13	Jana Novotná (TCH)	158.0526	24	+11
14	Katrina Adams (USA)	154.1429	105	+91
15	Robin White (USA)	150.5205	17	+2
16	Jill Hetherington (CAN)	145.8150	91	+75
17	Wendy Turnbull (AUS)	138.7857	15	-2
18	Patty Fendick (USA)	131.9659	71	+53
19	Chris Evert (USA)	122.5000	30	+11
20	Elizabeth Smylie (AUS)	121.3810	8	-12

== See also ==
- 1988 Nabisco Grand Prix – men's circuit
