= 1987 Athens Trophy – Singles =

Singles
- 1987 Athens Trophy

Final
- Champion: (Bulgaria) Katerina Maleeva
- Runner-up: (France) Julie Halard
- Score: 6–1, 6–0

Details
- Draw: 32 (4Q/1LL)
- Seeds: 8

Events
Singles	Doubles
← 1986 ·	Athens Trophy	· 1988 →

Sylvia Hanika was the defending champion, but did not compete this year.

Katerina Maleeva won the title by defeating Julie Halard 6–1, 6–0 in the final.

== Seeds ==
1. (Australia) Nicole Provis (second round)
2. (Bulgaria) Katerina Maleeva (champion)
3. (Italy) Sandra Cecchini (first round)
4. (United States) Kathleen Horvath (second round)
5. (West Germany) Isabel Cueto (semifinals)
6. (Austria) Judith Wiesner (semifinals)
7. (Argentina) Bettina Fulco (second round)
8. (Socialist Federal Republic of Yugoslavia) Sabrina Goleš (first round)

== Draw ==
=== Key ===
- Q = Qualifier
- WC = Wild card
- LL = Lucky loser
- Alt = Alternate
- SE = Special exempt
- PR = Protected ranking
- ITF = ITF entry
- JE = Junior exempt
- w/o = Walkover
- r = Retired
- d = Defaulted
- SR = Special ranking

=== Finals ===
Semifinals
5	(West Germany) Isabel Cueto	6	6
(France) Julie Halard	7	7
6	(Austria) Judith Wiesner	3	2
2	(Bulgaria) Katerina Maleeva	6	6

Final
(France) Julie Halard	1	0
2	(Bulgaria) Katerina Maleeva	6	6

=== Top half ===
First round
1	(Australia) N Provis	7	6
(Czechoslovakia) R Maršíková	6	2
Q	(France) A Dechaume	2	6	6
(Romania) V Ruzici	6	4	3
Q	(France) M Laval	1	3
(Argentina) A Villagrán	6	6
(Italy) F Bonsignori	3	0
5	(West Germany) I Cueto	6	6
4	(United States) K Horvath	6	6
(Netherlands) N Jagerman	3	0
(Greece) A Kanellopoulou	3	5
(France) J Halard	6	7
(Austria) B Paulus	6	2	6
(South Africa) D Van Rensburg	1	6	2
Q	(Soviet Union) L Meskhi	6	6
8	(Socialist Federal Republic of Yugoslavia) S Goleš	4	1

Second round
1	(Australia) N Provis	1	6	2
Q	(France) A Dechaume	6	4	6
(Argentina) A Villagrán	1	2
5	(West Germany) I Cueto	6	6
4	(United States) K Horvath	5	1
(France) J Halard	7	6
(Austria) B Paulus	4	2
Q	(Soviet Union) L Meskhi	6	6

Quarterfinals
Q	(France) A Dechaume	6	5	5
5	(West Germany) I Cueto	2	7	7
(France) J Halard	6	1	6
Q	(Soviet Union) L Meskhi	3	6	3

Semifinals
5	(West Germany) I Cueto	6	6
(France) J Halard	7	7

=== Bottom half ===
First round
6	(Austria) J Wiesner	6	6
Q	(Australia) J Byrne	3	1
(West Germany) A Betzner	2	4
LL	(Netherlands) H ter Riet	6	6
(Argentina) P Tarabini	6	6
(Belgium) A Devries	2	4
(Czechoslovakia) R Rajchrtová	6	3	6
3	(Italy) S Cecchini	1	6	3
7	(Argentina) B Fulco	7	6
(Austria) P Huber	6	3
(Greece) O Tsarbopoulou	6	6
(Australia) L Field	2	2
(Argentina) M Paz	3	6	6
(Italy) L Garrone	6	1	1
(Soviet Union) N Bykova	2	0
2	(Bulgaria) K Maleeva	6	6

Second round
6	(Austria) J Wiesner	6	6
LL	(Netherlands) H ter Riet	1	2
(Argentina) P Tarabini	6	6	6
(Czechoslovakia) R Rajchrtová	7	2	1
7	(Argentina) B Fulco	4	6	2
(Greece) O Tsarbopoulou	6	3	6
(Argentina) M Paz	2	1
2	(Bulgaria) K Maleeva	6	6

Quarterfinals
6	(Austria) J Wiesner	7	6
(Argentina) P Tarabini	5	0
(Greece) O Tsarbopoulou	1	5
2	(Bulgaria) K Maleeva	6	7

Semifinals
6	(Austria) J Wiesner	3	2
2	(Bulgaria) K Maleeva	6	6
