= 1988 Athens Trophy – Singles =

Singles
- 1988 Athens Trophy

Final
- Champion: (West Germany) Isabel Cueto
- Runner-up: (Italy) Laura Golarsa
- Score: 6–0, 6–1

Details
- Draw: 32
- Seeds: 8

Events
| Singles | Doubles |
| ← 1987 · | Athens Trophy | · 1989 → |

Katerina Maleeva was the defending champion but did not compete that year.

Isabel Cueto won in the final 6–0, 6–1 against Laura Golarsa.

== Seeds ==
A champion seed is indicated in bold text while text in italics indicates the round in which that seed was eliminated.

1. (West Germany) **Isabel Cueto (champion)**
2. (Austria) Judith Wiesner (quarterfinals)
3. (Austria) Barbara Paulus (semifinals)
4. (Socialist Federal Republic of Yugoslavia) Sabrina Goleš (second round)
5. (Greece) Angeliki Kanellopoulou (quarterfinals)
6. (Italy) Laura Garrone (first round)
7. (West Germany) Silke Meier (first round)
8. (Italy) Laura Golarsa (final)

== Draw ==
=== Key ===
- Q = Qualifier
- WC = Wild card
- LL = Lucky loser
- Alt = Alternate
- SE = Special exempt
- PR = Protected ranking
- ITF = ITF entry
- JE = Junior exempt
- w/o = Walkover
- r = Retired
- d = Defaulted
- SR = Special ranking

First round
1 | (West Germany) **I Cueto** | **6** | **6**
(Greece) X Anastasiados | 0 | 0
(Czechoslovakia) **I Budařová** | **6** | 4 | **6**
Q | (Switzerland) E Zardo | 4 | **6** | 3
(Sweden) J Jonerup | 4 | 4
(Brazil) **L Corsato** | **6** | **6**
(Socialist Federal Republic of Yugoslavia) M Jaušovec | 2 | 1
5 | (Greece) **A Kanellopoulou** | **6** | **6**
3 | (Austria) **B Paulus** | **6** | **6**
(France) M-C Calleja | 1 | 3
(Greece) **O Tsarbopoulou** | **6** | **6**
(Spain) I Varas | 2 | 1
(Australia) A Scott | 2 | 0
(West Germany) **V Martinek** | **6** | **6**
(West Germany) **S Frankl** | 5 | **5**
7 | (West Germany) S Meier | **7** | 2 | r
8 | (Italy) **L Golarsa** | **7** | **6**
(Brazil) A Vieira | 6 | 1
(Czechoslovakia) **R Maršíková** | **6** | 3 | **6**
(Brazil) P Medrado | 4 | **6** | 3
Q | (West Germany) **S Hack** | 5 | **6** | **6**
(Italy) S Dalla Valle | **7** | 3 | 3
(United Kingdom) S Loosemore | 5 | **7** | 2
4 | (Socialist Federal Republic of Yugoslavia) **S Goleš** | **7** | 6 | **6**
6 | (Italy) L Garrone | **6** | 5 | 1/r
Q | (Czechoslovakia) **L Lásková** | 4 | **7** | **3**
(France) K Quentrec | **6** | 4 | 3
Q | (France) **V Paquet** | 3 | **6** | **6**
(France) **P Etchemendy** | **6** | **6**
(Italy) S La Fratta | 1 | 1
LL | (West Germany) M Pawlik | 1 | 1
2 | (Austria) **J Wiesner** | **6** | **6**

Second round
1 | (West Germany) **I Cueto** | **6** | **6**
(Czechoslovakia) I Budařová | 0 | 1
(Brazil) L Corsato | 3 | 6
5 | (Greece) **A Kanellopoulou** | **6** | **7**
3 | (Austria) **B Paulus** | 6 | **7** | **6**
(Greece) O Tsarbopoulou | **7** | 5 | 1
(West Germany) V Martinek | 4 | **6** | 2
(West Germany) **S Frankl** | **6** | 0 | **6**
8 | (Italy) **L Golarsa** | **6** | **6**
(Czechoslovakia) R Maršíková | 2 | 1
Q | (West Germany) **S Hack** | **6** | **6**
4 | (Socialist Federal Republic of Yugoslavia) S Goleš | 4 | 3
Q | (Czechoslovakia) **L Lásková** | 4 | **7** | **6**
Q | (France) V Paquet | **6** | 6 | 2
(France) P Etchemendy | 4 | 2
2 | (Austria) **J Wiesner** | **6** | **6**

Quarterfinals
1 | (West Germany) **I Cueto** | **6** | **6**
5 | (Greece) A Kanellopoulou | 2 | 0
3 | (Austria) **B Paulus** | **6** | **6**
(West Germany) S Frankl | 2 | 3
8 | (Italy) **L Golarsa** | **6** | **6**
Q | (West Germany) S Hack | 4 | 2
Q | (Czechoslovakia) **L Lásková** | **6** | **7**
2 | (Austria) J Wiesner | 4 | 5

Semifinals
1 | (West Germany) **I Cueto** | **6** | **6**
3 | (Austria) B Paulus | 2 | 1
8 | (Italy) **L Golarsa** | **6** | **6**
Q | (Czechoslovakia) L Lásková | 3 | 1

Final
1 | (West Germany) **Isabel Cueto** | **6** | **6**
8 | (Italy) Laura Golarsa | 0 | 1
