= 1988 Athens Trophy – Doubles =

Doubles
- 1988 Athens Trophy
- 1987 Champions: (West Germany) Andrea Betzner (Austria) Judith Wiesner

Final
- Champions: (Socialist Federal Republic of Yugoslavia) Sabrina Goleš (Austria) Judith Wiesner
- Runners-up: (West Germany) Silke Frankl (West Germany) Sabine Hack
- Score: 7–5, 6–0

Events
Singles	Doubles
← 1987 ·	Athens Trophy	· 1989 →

Andrea Betzner and Judith Wiesner were the defending champions but only Wiesner competed that year with Sabrina Goleš.

Goleš and Wiesner won in the final 7–5, 6–0 against Silke Frankl and Sabine Hack.

== Seeds ==
Champion seeds are indicated in bold text while text in italics indicates the round in which those seeds were eliminated.

1. (Socialist Federal Republic of Yugoslavia) **Sabrina Goleš** / (Austria) **Judith Wiesner (champions)**
2. (Argentina) Gabriela Mosca / (United States) Emilse Raponi-Longo (first round)
3. (Czechoslovakia) Iva Budařová / (Brazil) Patricia Medrado (quarterfinals)
4. (Sweden) Anna-Karin Olsson / (Australia) Alison Scott (semifinals)

== Draw ==
=== Key ===
- Q = Qualifier
- WC = Wild card
- LL = Lucky loser
- Alt = Alternate
- SE = Special exempt
- PR = Protected ranking
- ITF = ITF entry
- JE = Junior exempt
- w/o = Walkover
- r = Retired
- d = Defaulted
- SR = Special ranking

First round
1	(Socialist Federal Republic of Yugoslavia) **S Goleš** (Austria) **J Wiesner**	**6**	**6**
(Italy) L Garrone (Italy) L Golarsa	3	1
(Hong Kong) **P Moreno** (Austria) **H Sprung**	**6**	1	**7**
(Italy) S Dalla Valle (West Germany) C Schneider	4	**6**	5
4	(Sweden) **A-K Olsson** (Australia) **A Scott**	**6**	**6**
(France) M-C Calleja (Greece) A Kanellopoulou	3	2
(Socialist Federal Republic of Yugoslavia) **M Jaušovec** (Czechoslovakia) **R Maršíková**	**6**	**6**
(Brazil) L Corsato (Argentina) A Tiezzi	2	3
(West Germany) **S Frankl** (West Germany) **S Hack**	**6**	**6**
(Czechoslovakia) L Lásková (West Germany) V Martinek	1	3
(France) P Etchemendy (France) K Quentrec	3	2
3	(Czechoslovakia) **I Budařová** (Brazil) **P Medrado**	**6**	**6**
(France) **F Martin** (France) **V Paquet**	2	**6**	**6**
(West Germany) I Cueto (West Germany) S Meier	**6**	4	3
(Austria) **B Paulus** (Greece) **O Tsarbopoulou**	3	**6**	**7**
2	(Argentina) G Mosca (United States) E Raponi-Longo	**6**	4	5

Quarterfinals
1	(Socialist Federal Republic of Yugoslavia) **S Goleš** (Austria) **J Wiesner**	**7**	**6**
(Hong Kong) P Moreno (Austria) H Sprung	5	4
4	(Sweden) **A-K Olsson** (Australia) **A Scott**	3	**6**	**6**
(Socialist Federal Republic of Yugoslavia) M Jaušovec (Czechoslovakia) R Maršíková	**6**	4	4
(West Germany) **S Frankl** (West Germany) **S Hack**	**6**	**6**
3	(Czechoslovakia) I Budařová (Brazil) P Medrado	4	1
(France) **F Martin** (France) **V Paquet**	**6**	**7**
(Austria) B Paulus (Greece) O Tsarbopoulou	3	5

Semifinals
1	(Socialist Federal Republic of Yugoslavia) **S Goleš** (Austria) **J Wiesner**	**6**	**6**
4	(Sweden) A-K Olsson (Australia) A Scott	4	4
(West Germany) **S Frankl** (West Germany) **S Hack**	3	**7**	**7**
(France) F Martin (France) V Paquet	**6**	5	5

Final
1	(Socialist Federal Republic of Yugoslavia) **Sabrina Goleš** (Austria) **Judith Wiesner**	**7**	**6**
(West Germany) Silke Frankl (West Germany) Sabine Hack	5	0
