= 1987 Athens Trophy – Doubles =

Doubles
- 1987 Athens Trophy

Final
- Champions: (West Germany) Andrea Betzner (Austria) Judith Wiesner
- Runners-up: (United States) Kathleen Horvath (South Africa) Dianne Van Rensburg
- Score: 6–4, 7–6

Details
- Draw: 16
- Seeds: 4

Events
Singles	Doubles
← 1986 ·	Athens Trophy	· 1988 →

Isabel Cueto and Arantxa Sánchez Vicario were the defending champions, but Sánchez Vicario did not compete this year. Cueto teamed up with Bettina Fulco and lost in the first round to Mercedes Paz and Patricia Tarabini.

Andrea Betzner and Judith Wiesner won the title by defeating Kathleen Horvath and Dianne Van Rensburg 6–4, 7–6 in the final.

== Seeds ==
1. (Argentina) Mercedes Paz / (Argentina) Patricia Tarabini (quarterfinals)
2. (Australia) Jenny Byrne / (Australia) Louise Field (first round)
3. (Soviet Union) Natalia Bykova / (Soviet Union) Leila Meskhi (quarterfinals)
4. (Italy) Sandra Cecchini / (Socialist Federal Republic of Yugoslavia) Sabrina Goleš (semifinals)

== Draw ==
=== Key ===
- Q = Qualifier
- WC = Wild card
- LL = Lucky loser
- Alt = Alternate
- SE = Special exempt
- PR = Protected ranking
- ITF = ITF entry
- JE = Junior exempt
- w/o = Walkover
- r = Retired
- d = Defaulted
- SR = Special ranking

=== Draw ===
First round
1	(Argentina) M Paz (Argentina) P Tarabini	6	7
(West Germany) I Cueto (Argentina) B Fulco	3	5
(West Germany) A Betzner (Austria) J Wiesner	3	6	7
(Czechoslovakia) R Maršíková (Czechoslovakia) R Zrubáková	6	2	6
3	(Soviet Union) N Bykova (Soviet Union) L Meskhi	7	6
(Sweden) AK Olsson (Australia) L O'Neill	5	1
(France) A Dechaume (France) M Laval	6	4
(Australia) N Provis (Czechoslovakia) R Rajchrtová	7	6
(Switzerland) L Drescher (Italy) L Garrone	6	0
(Netherlands) N Jagerman (Netherlands) S Schilder	7	6
(Belgium) A Devries (Greece) O Tsarbopoulou	2	3
4	(Italy) S Cecchini (Socialist Federal Republic of Yugoslavia) S Goleš	6	6
(United States) K Horvath (South Africa) D Van Rensburg	6	3	6
(Austria) P Huber (Greece) A Kanellopoulou	4	6	2
(Argentina) G Mosca (Argentina) A Villagrán	6	6
2	(Australia) J Byrne (Australia) L Field	4	3

Quarterfinals
1	(Argentina) M Paz (Argentina) P Tarabini	6	6	4
(West Germany) A Betzner (Austria) J Wiesner	0	7	6
3	(Soviet Union) N Bykova (Soviet Union) L Meskhi	6	4
(Australia) N Provis (Czechoslovakia) R Rajchrtová	7	6
(Netherlands) N Jagerman (Netherlands) S Schilder	3	2
4	(Italy) S Cecchini (Socialist Federal Republic of Yugoslavia) S Goleš	6	6
(United States) K Horvath (South Africa) D Van Rensburg	4	6	6
(Argentina) G Mosca (Argentina) A Villagrán	6	2	3

Semifinals
(West Germany) A Betzner (Austria) J Wiesner	7	6
(Australia) N Provis (Czechoslovakia) R Rajchrtová	5	1
4	(Italy) S Cecchini (Socialist Federal Republic of Yugoslavia) S Goleš	7	2	2
(United States) K Horvath (South Africa) D Van Rensburg	6	6	6

Final
(West Germany) A Betzner (Austria) J Wiesner	6	7
(United States) K Horvath (South Africa) D Van Rensburg	4	6
