= 1988 Athens Trophy =

Tennis tournament

- Date: 1–7 August
- Edition: 3rd
- Category: Tier V
- Draw: 32S / 16D
- Prize money: $75,000
- Surface: Clay / outdoor
- Location: Athens, Greece
- Venue: Athens Lawn Tennis Club

Champions

Singles
- (West Germany) Isabel Cueto

Doubles
- (Socialist Federal Republic of Yugoslavia) Sabrina Goleš / (Austria) Judith Wiesner
← 1987 ·	Athens Trophy	· 1989 →

The 1988 Athens Trophy was a women's tennis tournament played on outdoor clay courts at the Athens Lawn Tennis Club in Athens, Greece and was part of Tier V of the 1988 WTA Tour. It was the third edition of the tournament and was held from 1 August until 7 August 1988. First-seeded Isabel Cueto won the singles title and earned $12,000 first-prize money.

== Finals ==
=== Singles ===
(West Germany) Isabel Cueto defeated (Italy) Laura Golarsa 6–0, 6–1

- It was Cueto's 2nd title of the year and the 3rd of her career.

=== Doubles ===
(Socialist Federal Republic of Yugoslavia) Sabrina Goleš / (Austria) Judith Wiesner defeated (West Germany) Silke Frankl / (West Germany) Sabine Hack 7–5, 6–0

- It was Goleš' only title of the year and the 3rd of her career. It was Wiesner's 2nd title of the year and the 3rd of her career.

== See also ==
- 1988 Athens Open – men's tournament
