= 1987 Athens Trophy =

- Date: 5–11 October
- Edition: 2nd
- Draw: 32S / 16D
- Prize money: $75,000
- Surface: Clay / outdoor
- Location: Athens, Greece

Champions

Singles
- (Bulgaria) Katerina Maleeva

Doubles
- (West Germany) Andrea Betzner / (Austria) Judith Wiesner
← 1986 ·	Athens Trophy	· 1988 →

The 1987 Athens Trophy was a women's tennis tournament played on outdoor clay courts in Athens in Greece. Further, it was part of the 1987 Virginia Slims World Championship Series. It was the second edition of the tournament and was held from 5 October until 11 October 1987. Second-seeded Katerina Maleeva won the singles title.

== Finals ==
=== Singles ===
(Bulgaria) Katerina Maleeva defeated (France) Julie Halard 6–1, 6–0

- It was Maleeva's 2nd and last singles title of the year and the 4th of her career.

=== Doubles ===
(West Germany) Andrea Betzner / (Austria) Judith Wiesner defeated (United States) Kathleen Horvath / (South Africa) Dianne van Rensburg 6–4, 7–6

- It was Betzner's only title of the year and the 1st of her career. It was Wiesner's only title of the year and the 1st of her career.

== See also ==
- 1987 Athens Open – men's tournament
