= 1988 WTA Tier I Series =

1988 WTA Tier I

Details
- Duration: March 14 – May 9
- Tournaments: 2

Achievements (singles)
- Most titles: (West Germany) Steffi Graf (2)
- Most finals: (West Germany) Steffi Graf (2)

The table below shows the 1988 WTA Tier I Series schedule.

== Singles ==
Tournament	Surface	Week	Winner	Finalist	Semi finalists	Quarter finalists
Key Biscayne	Hard	March 14	(West Germany) Steffi Graf (1); 6–4, 6–4	(United States) Chris Evert (2)	(United States) Stephanie Rehe (United States) Mary Joe Fernandez (15)	(West Germany) Claudia Kohde-Kilsch (6) (United States) Barbara Potter (9) (South Africa) Elna Reinach (Czechoslovakia) Helena Suková (5)
Berlin	Clay	May 9	(West Germany) Steffi Graf (1); 6–3, 6–2	(Czechoslovakia) Helena Suková (2)	(West Germany) Claudia Kohde-Kilsch (3) (West Germany) Sylvia Hanika (7)	(Australia) Nicole Bradtke (Italy) Sandra Cecchini (6) (Czechoslovakia) Radka Zrubáková (United States) Mary Joe Fernandez (8)

== See also ==
- WTA Tier I events
- 1988 ATP Tour
- 1988 WTA Tour
