= 1988 US Open – Women's singles =

Women's singles
- 1988 US Open

Final
- Champion: (West Germany) Steffi Graf
- Runner-up: (Argentina) Gabriela Sabatini
- Score: 6–3, 3–6, 6–1

Details
- Draw: 128
- Seeds: 16

Events
| Singles | men | women | | boys | girls |
| Doubles | men | women | mixed | boys | girls |
| WC Singles | men | women | quad |
| WC Doubles | men | women | quad |
| Legends | men | women | mixed |
- US Open

Steffi Graf defeated Gabriela Sabatini in the final, 6–3, 3–6, 6–1 to win the women's singles tennis title at the 1988 US Open. It was her first US Open title and fifth major singles title overall. With the win, Graf became the third woman to complete the Grand Slam, after Maureen Connolly and Margaret Court, also completing the career Grand Slam. Moreover, it was the fourth component of her Golden Slam, which remains the only calendar Golden Slam achieved in pedestrian tennis. It was Sabatini's first major final.

Martina Navratilova was the two-time defending champion, but was defeated in the quarterfinals by Zina Garrison.

This was the first US Open final in 15 years not to feature an American, the last occasion being in 1973.

== Seeds ==
1. (West Germany) Steffi Graf (champion)
2. (United States) Martina Navratilova (quarterfinals)
3. (United States) Chris Evert (semifinals, withdrew due to illness)
4. (United States) Pam Shriver (second round)
5. (Argentina) Gabriela Sabatini (final)
6. (Bulgaria) Manuela Maleeva-Fragnière (quarterfinals)
7. (Czechoslovakia) Helena Suková (fourth round)
8. (Soviet Union) Natasha Zvereva (first round)
9. (United States) Lori McNeil (third round)
10. (West Germany) Claudia Kohde-Kilsch (third round)
11. (United States) Zina Garrison (semifinals)
12. (United States) Barbara Potter (fourth round)
13. (United States) Mary Joe Fernández (third round)
14. (Bulgaria) Katerina Maleeva (quarterfinals)
15. (West Germany) Sylvia Hanika (third round)
16. (Soviet Union) Larisa Savchenko (quarterfinals)

== Draw ==
Key

- Q = Qualifier
- WC = Wild card
- LL = Lucky loser
- Alt = Alternate
- ITF = ITF entry
- PR = Protected ranking
- SR = Special ranking
- SE = Special exempt
- JE = Junior exempt
- JR = Junior Accelerator Programme entrant
- CO = College Accelerator Programme entrant
- NG = Next Gen Accelerator Program entrant
- w/o = Walkover
- r = Retired
- d = Defaulted

=== Finals ===
Quarterfinals
1 | (West Germany) Steffi Graf | 6 | 6
14 | (Bulgaria) Katerina Maleeva | 3 | 0
3 | (United States) Chris Evert | 3 | 6 | 6
6 | (Bulgaria) Manuela Maleeva-Fragnière | 6 | 4 | 2
5 | (Argentina) Gabriela Sabatini | 4 | 6 | 6
16 | (Soviet Union) Larisa Savchenko | 6 | 4 | 1
11 | (United States) Zina Garrison | 6 | 6^{3} | 7
2 | (United States) Martina Navratilova | 4 | 7^{7} | 5

Semifinals
1 | (West Germany) Steffi Graf | w/o
3 | (United States) Chris Evert
5 | (Argentina) Gabriela Sabatini | 6 | 7
11 | (United States) Zina Garrison | 4 | 5

Final
1 | (West Germany) Steffi Graf | 6 | 3 | 6
5 | (Argentina) Gabriela Sabatini | 3 | 6 | 1

=== Top half ===
==== Section 1 ====
First round
1 | (West Germany) S Graf | 6 | 6
(Australia) E Minter | 1 | 1
(Netherlands) M Bollegraf | 6 | 4 | 7
(France) I Demongeot | 2 | 6 | 5
(United States) R Reis | 6 | 6
WC | (United States) M Werdel | 4 | 0
(United States) K Rinaldi | 4 | 2
(France) N Herreman | 6 | 6
(United States) K Adams | 2 | 6^{3}
(Netherlands) N Jagerman | 6 | 7^{7}
(South Africa) R Fairbank | 2 | 3
(United States) P Fendick | 6 | 6
(Netherlands) B Schultz | 3 | 5
(United States) A Grossman | 6 | 7
(United Kingdom) S Gomer | 1 | 3
15 | (West Germany) S Hanika | 6 | 6

Second round
1 | (West Germany) S Graf | 6 | 6
(Netherlands) M Bollegraf | 1 | 0
(United States) R Reis | 2 | 4
(France) N Herreman | 6 | 6
(Netherlands) N Jagerman | 5 | 6 | 1
(United States) P Fendick | 7 | 4 | 6
(United States) A Grossman | 2 | 2
15 | (West Germany) S Hanika | 6 | 6

Third round
1 | (West Germany) S Graf | 6 | 6
(France) N Herreman | 0 | 1
(United States) P Fendick | 6^{4} | 6 | 7
15 | (West Germany) S Hanika | 7^{7} | 3 | 5

Fourth round
1 | (West Germany) S Graf | 6 | 6
(United States) P Fendick | 4 | 2

==== Section 2 ====
First round
14 | (Bulgaria) K Maleeva | 6 | 6
(Japan) E Inoue | 2 | 1
WC | (United States) L Poruri | 7^{7} | 6
(United Kingdom) M Javer | 6^{3} | 4
(Czechoslovakia) A Holíková | 6 | 0 | 6
(New Zealand) B Cordwell | 3 | 6 | 4
(Italy) S Cecchini | 6^{1} | 3
(Belgium) S Wasserman | 7^{7} | 6
(United States) A Frazier | 6 | 7^{7}
(Greece) O Tsarbopoulou | 1 | 6^{4}
(Belgium) A Devries | 6 | 1 | 7^{7}
(France) J Halard | 2 | 6 | 6^{3}
(United States) G Fernández | 4 | 0
(Australia) D Balestrat | 6 | 6
WC | (United States) L Bonder-Kreiss | 1 | 4
7 | (Czechoslovakia) H Suková | 6 | 6

Second round
14 | (Bulgaria) K Maleeva | 6 | 6
WC | (United States) L Poruri | 1 | 1
(Czechoslovakia) A Holíková | 3 | 7^{8} | 1
(Belgium) S Wasserman | 6 | 6^{6} | 6
(United States) A Frazier | 3 | 6 | 6
(Belgium) A Devries | 6 | 1 | 3
(Australia) D Balestrat | 2 | 3
7 | (Czechoslovakia) H Suková | 6 | 6

Third round
14 | (Bulgaria) K Maleeva | 5 | 6 | 6
(Belgium) S Wasserman | 7 | 2 | 1
(United States) A Frazier | 5 | 5
7 | (Czechoslovakia) H Suková | 7 | 7

Fourth round
14 | (Bulgaria) K Maleeva | 6 | 6
7 | (Czechoslovakia) H Suková | 1 | 3

==== Section 3 ====
First round
3 | (United States) C Evert | 6 | 6
(Spain) C Martínez | 4 | 1
(United States) H Cioffi | 6 | 6
(Italy) L Lapi | 4 | 4
(United States) M Torres | 1 | 6 | 6
(Japan) M Yanagi | 6 | 4 | 4
(Austria) P Huber | 1 | 6 | 6^{5}
(Czechoslovakia) R Rajchrtová | 6 | 1 | 7^{7}
(United States) B Herr | 6 | 1 | 6
(United States) M-L Daniels | 3 | 6 | 2
(Austria) J Wiesner | 6 | 6
(Czechoslovakia) J Novotná | 2 | 3
(Soviet Union) N Bykova | 6 | 4 | 6
(France) A Dechaume | 3 | 6 | 4
(Czechoslovakia) I Budařová | 4 | 0
9 | (United States) L McNeil | 6 | 6

Second round
3 | (United States) C Evert | 6 | 6
(United States) H Cioffi | 1 | 0
(United States) M Torres | 7 | 7^{7}
(Czechoslovakia) R Rajchrtová | 5 | 6^{4}
(United States) B Herr | 6 | 4 | 0
(Austria) J Wiesner | 3 | 6 | 6
(Soviet Union) N Bykova | 5 | 3
9 | (United States) L McNeil | 7 | 6

Third round
3 | (United States) C Evert | 6 | 6
(United States) M Torres | 3 | 3
(Austria) J Wiesner | 7^{7} | 3 | 6
9 | (United States) L McNeil | 6^{3} | 6 | 4

Fourth round
3 | (United States) C Evert | 6 | 6
(Austria) J Wiesner | 2 | 4

==== Section 4 ====
First round
12 | (United States) B Potter | 6 | 6
(West Germany) W Probst | 2 | 3
(West Germany) S Frankl | 6^{6} | 6 | 6^{3}
(United States) R White | 7^{8} | 2 | 7^{7}
(United States) M Gurney | 1 | 1
(West Germany) C Porwik | 6 | 6
(United States) B Nagelsen | 6 | 6
(United States) C Benjamin | 2 | 2
(France) C Tanvier | 6^{6} | 3
(Italy) L Garrone | 7^{8} | 6
(West Germany) I Cueto | 6 | 6
Q | (United States) L Green | 4 | 0
WC | (United States) J Santrock | 2 | 6 | 6
(Italy) F Bonsignori | 6 | 2 | 1
(Brazil) N Dias | 1 | 4
6 | (Bulgaria) M Maleeva-Fragnière | 6 | 6

Second round
12 | (United States) B Potter | 6 | 7
(United States) R White | 3 | 5
(West Germany) C Porwik | 6^{6} | 5
(United States) B Nagelsen | 7^{8} | 7
(Italy) L Garrone | 1 | 1
(West Germany) I Cueto | 6 | 6
WC | (United States) J Santrock | 6^{4} | 2
6 | (Bulgaria) M Maleeva-Fragnière | 7^{7} | 6

Third round
12 | (United States) B Potter | 7 | 6
(United States) B Nagelsen | 5 | 3
(West Germany) I Cueto | 1 | 6 | 3
6 | (Bulgaria) M Maleeva-Fragnière | 6 | 1 | 6

Fourth round
12 | (United States) B Potter | 3 | 2
6 | (Bulgaria) M Maleeva-Fragnière | 6 | 6

=== Bottom half ===
==== Section 5 ====
First round
5 | (Argentina) G Sabatini | 6 | 6
(Argentina) B Fulco | 3 | 0
(Japan) A Kijimuta | 2 | 3
(United States) B Bowes | 6 | 6
(South Africa) D Van Rensburg | 6 | 6
(United States) W White | 3 | 4
(Brazil) P Medrado | 2 | 5
Q | (New Zealand) J Richardson | 6 | 7
(United States) H Ludloff | 6^{3} | 2
(Poland) I Kuczyńska | 7^{7} | 6
Q | (Japan) K Okamoto | 1 | 1
(United States) S Rehe | 6 | 6
(Italy) R Reggi | 7^{7} | 7
Q | (Australia) J-A Faull | 6^{4} | 5
(Greece) A Kanellopoulou | 4 | 2
10 | (West Germany) C Kohde-Kilsch | 6 | 6

Second round
5 | (Argentina) G Sabatini | 6 | 6
(United States) B Bowes | 2 | 0
(South Africa) D Van Rensburg | 6 | 5 | 5
Q | (New Zealand) J Richardson | 1 | 7 | 7
(Poland) I Kuczyńska | 2 | 2
(United States) S Rehe | 6 | 6
(Italy) R Reggi | 2 | 6 | 4
10 | (West Germany) C Kohde-Kilsch | 6 | 2 | 6

Third round
5 | (Argentina) G Sabatini | 6 | 6
Q | (New Zealand) J Richardson | 1 | 1
(United States) S Rehe | 6 | 2 | 6
10 | (West Germany) C Kohde-Kilsch | 3 | 6 | 3

Fourth round
5 | (Argentina) G Sabatini | 7 | 6
(United States) S Rehe | 5 | 4

==== Section 6 ====
First round
16 | (Soviet Union) L Savchenko | 7^{7} | 6
(Italy) L Golarsa | 6^{4} | 2
(United States) E Burgin | 6
(West Germany) E Pfaff | 3
(United States) G Magers | 6 | 5 | 6
(West Germany) S Meier | 3 | 7 | 4
(Argentina) A Villagrán | 3 | 0
(Canada) C Bassett-Seguso | 6 | 6
(United States) T Phelps | 3 | 6 | 6
WC | (United States) C Cunningham | 6 | 1 | 2
WC | (United States) D Graham | 4 | 6 | 1
(United States) A Henricksson | 6 | 4 | 6
(Soviet Union) L Meskhi | 7 | 4 | 6
Q | (Denmark) T Scheuer-Larsen | 5 | 6 | 3
(United States) A Smith | 4 | 3
4 | (United States) P Shriver | 6 | 6

Second round
16 | (Soviet Union) L Savchenko | 5 | 7 | 6
(United States) E Burgin | 7 | 5 | 4
(United States) G Magers | 4 | 1
(Canada) C Bassett-Seguso | 6 | 6
(United States) T Phelps | 7 | 6
(United States) A Henricksson | 5 | 2
(Soviet Union) L Meskhi | 4 | 6 | 6
4 | (United States) P Shriver | 6 | 1 | 4

Third round
16 | (Soviet Union) L Savchenko | 6 | 6
(Canada) C Bassett-Seguso | 4 | 3
(United States) T Phelps | 4 | 6 | 7^{7}
(Soviet Union) L Meskhi | 6 | 3 | 6^{4}

Fourth round
16 | (Soviet Union) L Savchenko | 6 | 6
(United States) T Phelps | 3 | 1

==== Section 7 ====
First round
8 | (Soviet Union) N Zvereva | 6 | 3 | 4
Q | (United States) K Steinmetz | 4 | 6 | 6
(Spain) A Sánchez Vicario | 6 | 6
WC | (United States) K Keil | 3 | 0
(United States) S Sloane | 6 | 6
(United Kingdom) J Durie | 3 | 1
Q | (France) C Suire | 6 | 4 | 6
(South Africa) K Schimper | 3 | 6 | 2
(United States) H Na | 2 | 6 | 4
(Canada) J Hetherington | 6 | 2 | 6
(West Germany) C Singer | 5 | 1
(Italy) L Ferrando | 7 | 6
(Canada) H Kelesi | 6 | 6
WC | (United States) C Christian | 2 | 3
(Australia) N Provis | 0 | 3
11 | (United States) Z Garrison | 6 | 6

Second round
Q | (United States) K Steinmetz | 2 | 2
(Spain) A Sánchez Vicario | 6 | 6
(United States) S Sloane | 6 | 6
Q | (France) C Suire | 2 | 3
(Canada) J Hetherington | 6 | 6
(Italy) L Ferrando | 2 | 1
(Canada) H Kelesi | 6 | 5 | 0
11 | (United States) Z Garrison | 3 | 7 | 6

Third round
(Spain) A Sánchez Vicario | 6 | 6
(United States) S Sloane | 3 | 3
(Canada) J Hetherington | 1 | 1
11 | (United States) Z Garrison | 6 | 6

Fourth round
(Spain) A Sánchez Vicario | 6 | 5 | 2
11 | (United States) Z Garrison | 4 | 7 | 6

==== Section 8 ====
First round
13 | (United States) M J Fernández | 6 | 6
LL | (Australia) J Byrne | 1 | 2
(United States) M Louie-Harper | 6 | 6^{3} | 1
(France) N Tauziat | 1 | 7^{7} | 6
(Argentina) M Paz | 7 | 6
Q | (United Kingdom) C Wood | 5 | 2
(Czechoslovakia) R Zrubáková | 1 | 4
(South Africa) E Reinach | 6 | 6
(Australia) W Turnbull | 3 | 1
(Australia) A Minter | 6 | 6
(Socialist Federal Republic of Yugoslavia) S Goleš | 6 | 6
(United States) S Martin | 0 | 3
(United States) E Hakami | 3 | 6 | 6
(Sweden) M Lindström | 6 | 3 | 2
(Sweden) C Lindqvist | 1 | 3
2 | (United States) M Navratilova | 6 | 6

Second round
13 | (United States) M J Fernández | 6 | 6
(France) N Tauziat | 4 | 4
(Argentina) M Paz | 6 | 2 | 1
(South Africa) E Reinach | 2 | 6 | 6
(Australia) A Minter | 1 | 6 | 6
(Socialist Federal Republic of Yugoslavia) S Goleš | 6 | 0 | 3
(United States) E Hakami | 2 | 1
2 | (United States) M Navratilova | 6 | 6

Third round
13 | (United States) M J Fernández | 5 | 3
(South Africa) E Reinach | 7 | 6
(Australia) A Minter | 1 | 3
2 | (United States) M Navratilova | 6 | 6

Fourth round
(South Africa) E Reinach | 4 | 1
2 | (United States) M Navratilova | 6 | 6

| Preceded by 1988 Wimbledon Championships – Women's singles | Grand Slam women's singles | Succeeded by 1989 Australian Open – Women's singles |
