= Leona Lásková =

Czech tennis player

- Full name: Leona Lásková
- Country (sports): Czechoslovakia; Czech Republic
- Born: 7 April 1970 (age 55)
- Retired: 1995
- Prize money: $86,683

Singles
- Career record: 121-98
- Career titles: 3 ITF
- Highest ranking: No. 122 (31 July 1989)

Grand Slam singles results
- French Open: 1R (1989, 1991)

Doubles
- Career record: 37-52
- Career titles: 1 ITF
- Highest ranking: No. 93 (15 April 1991)

Grand Slam doubles results
- French Open: 1R (1990, 1991)
- Wimbledon: 1R (1991)
- US Open: 1R (1990)

Leona Lásková (born 7 April 1970) is a Czech former professional tennis player.

== Biography ==
Lásková reached top rankings on the professional tour of 122 in singles and 93 in doubles.

On the WTA Tour, Lásková's best singles performance came at Athens in 1988, when she made it through to the semi-finals, beating second seed Judith Wiesner en route. Her only WTA Tour final came in doubles and was also in Athens, partnering with Jana Pospíšilová to a runner-up finish in 1990.

At grand slam level she twice featured in the main draw of the French Open women's singles and also played in the doubles main draws at Wimbledon and the US Open.

Retiring from the tour in 1995, Lásková is now a tennis trainer at TK Sparta Prague.

== WTA Tour finals ==
=== Doubles (0–1) ===
| Result | Date | Tournament | Tier | Surface | Partner | Opponents | Score |
|---|---|---|---|---|---|---|---|
| Loss | Sep 1990 | Athens, Greece | Tier V | Clay | (Czechoslovakia) Jana Pospíšilová | (Italy) Laura Garrone (Czechoslovakia) Karin Kschwendt | 0–6, 6–1, 6–7^{(6–8)} |

== ITF finals ==
=== Singles (3–1) ===
Legend
$25,000 tournaments
$10,000 tournaments

| Result | No. | Date | Tournament | Surface | Opponent | Score |
|---|---|---|---|---|---|---|
| Loss | 1. | 5 October 1987 | Rabac, Yugoslavia | Clay | (Netherlands) Hester Witvoet | 3–6, 2–6 |
| Win | 2. | 27 June 1988 | Neumünster, West Germany | Clay | (Czechoslovakia) Hana Fukárková | 6–2, 6–4 |
| Win | 3. | 29 August 1994 | Bad Nauheim, Germany | Clay | (Ukraine) Natalia Chasovaya | 6–2, 3–6, 6–4 |
| Win | 4. | 28 November 1994 | Beersheva, Israel | Hard | (North Macedonia) Ivona Mihailova | 6–3, 6–1 |

=== Doubles (1–0) ===
| Result | No. | Date | Tournament | Surface | Partner | Opponents | Score |
|---|---|---|---|---|---|---|---|
| Win | 1. | 12 March 1990 | Reims, France | Clay | (Czechoslovakia) Michaela Peterová | (United Kingdom) Kaye Hand (Greece) Julia Apostoli | 6–2, 3–6, 6–3 |
