= Andrea Betzner =

German tennis player

- Country (sports): West Germany
- Born: 10 July 1966 (age 59) Freiburg, West Germany
- Retired: 1990
- Prize money: $93,918

Singles
- Career record: 59–72
- Highest ranking: No. 115 (5 January 1985)

Grand Slam singles results
- Australian Open: 1R (1987, 1989)
- French Open: 1R (1985, 1986)
- Wimbledon: 2R (1986)
- US Open: 1R (1985, 1986)

Doubles
- Career record: 43–52
- Career titles: 2 WTA, 1 ITF
- Highest ranking: No. 54 (26 October 1987)

Grand Slam doubles results
- Australian Open: 2R (1985)
- French Open: 2R (1987)
- Wimbledon: 2R (1986)
- US Open: 1R (1986)

Andrea Betzner (born 10 July 1966) is a former German tennis player. Betzner won two WTA doubles titles during her tennis career. In Fed Cup, she played in 1985 in the German team.

Andrea has competed in the Australian Open, at Wimbledon, the French Open, the US Open and many other events.

== Book author ==
She has written a book about tennis. Its German title is Unterschiede der Treffstabilität im Tennis: der Einfluß von körperlicher Reife und sportartspezifischer Belastung. This roughly translates as Differences in accuracy stability in tennis: the influence of physical maturity and sport-specific loading.

== WTA finals ==
=== Doubles (2–1) ===
Result	W/L	Date	Tournament	Surface	Partner	Opponents	Score
Win	2–1	Oct 1987	Athens, Greece	Clay	(Austria) Judith Wiesner	(United States) Kathy Horvath (South Africa) Dinky Van Rensburg	6–4, 7–6^{(7–0)}
Win	2–0	May 1988	Taranto, Italy	Clay	(West Germany) Claudia Porwik	(Italy) Laura Garrone (Canada) Helen Kelesi	6–1, 6–2
Loss	2–1	Jul 1988	Hamburg, West Germany	Clay	(Austria) Judith Wiesner	(Czechoslovakia) Jana Novotná (Denmark) Tine Scheuer-Larsen	4–6, 2–6

== ITF finals ==
=== Singles (0–2) ===
Legend
$25,000 tournaments
$10,000 tournaments

Result	No.	Date	Tournament	Surface	Opponent	Score
Loss	1.	22 August 1983	Herne, West Germany	Clay	(Denmark) Tine Scheuer-Larsen	2–6, 2–6
Loss	2.	4 July 1988	Vaihingen, West Germany	Clay	(South Africa) Amanda Coetzer	2–6, 3–6

=== Doubles (1–0) ===
Result	No.	Date	Tournament	Surface	Partner	Opponents	Score
Win	1.	10 July 1989	Erlangen, West Germany	Clay	(West Germany) Wiltrud Probst	(Netherlands) Ingelise Driehuis (United States) Jennifer Fuchs	6–2, 6–3
