= Silke Frankl =

German tennis player

- Country (sports): West Germany; Germany
- Born: 29 May 1970 (age 54); Mannheim, West Germany
- Retired: 1998
- Prize money: $286,468

Singles
- Career record: 157–144
- Career titles: 2 ITF
- Highest ranking: No. 67 (15 August 1994)

Grand Slam singles results
- Australian Open: 1R (1992)
- French Open: 3R (1993)
- Wimbledon: 3R (1994)
- US Open: 1R (1988, 91, 92, 93, 94)

Doubles
- Career record: 29–56
- Career titles: 1 ITF
- Highest ranking: No. 127 (2 March 1992)

Grand Slam doubles results
- Australian Open: 1R (1990, 1992)
- French Open: 1R (1989)

Silke Frankl (born 29 May 1970) is a former professional tennis player from Germany.

== Biography ==
Born in Mannheim, Frankl began competing on the WTA Tour in 1988.

Her only WTA Tour final came in doubles, at the 1988 Athens Trophy.

Frankl broke into the top 100 of the singles rankings for the first time in 1993 and made the third round of the 1993 French Open.

In 1994 she reached her best ranking of 67, with her performances including making the semi-finals at the Prague Open, a win over 14th seed Zina Garrison at the French Open and a third round appearance at Wimbledon.

She retired from professional tennis in 1998 but continued to play in the Bundesliga for several years with TK Grün-Weiss Mannheim.

== WTA Tour finals ==
=== Doubles (0–1) ===
Result	Date	Tournament	Tier	Surface	Partner	Opponents	Score
Loss	August, 1988	Athens, Greece	Category 1	Clay	(West Germany) Sabine Hack	(Socialist Federal Republic of Yugoslavia) Sabrina Goleš (Austria) Judith Wiesner	5–7, 0–6

== ITF finals ==
=== Singles (2–6) ===
Legend
$25,000 tournaments
$10,000 tournaments

Result	No.	Date	Tournament	Surface	Opponent	Score
Win	1.	20 April 1987	Queens, United Kingdom	Hard	(United Kingdom) Katie Rickett	6–3, 7–5
Loss	2.	21 March 1988	Reims, France	Clay	(France) Catherine Bonnet	4–6, 6–7
Loss	3.	3 July 1989	Vaihingen, West Germany	Clay	(West Germany) Isabel Cueto	1–6, 1–6
Loss	4.	20 August 1989	Budapest, Hungary	Clay	(Bulgaria) Elena Pampoulova	4–6, 7–6, 0–6
Loss	5.	6 August 1990	Budapest, Hungary	Clay	(Hungary) Anna Földényi	2–6, 6–4, 4–6
Win	6.	1 July 1991	Vaihingen, Germany	Clay	(Germany) Katja Oeljeklaus	6–0, 7–5
Loss	7.	13 May 1996	Tortosa, Spain	Clay	(Switzerland) Angela Bürgis	1–6, 1–6
Loss	8.	11 August 1996	Paderborn, Germany	Clay	(Croatia) Maja Palaveršić	1–6, 7–6, 3–6

=== Doubles (1–2) ===
Result	No.	Date	Tournament	Surface	Partner	Opponents	Score
Loss	1.	14 August 1989	Budapest, Hungary	Clay	(Finland) Nanne Dahlman	(Czechoslovakia) Hana Fukárková (Czechoslovakia) Denisa Krajčovičová	6–4, 3–6, 3–6
Loss	2.	17 June 1996	Klosters, Switzerland	Clay	(Austria) Ursula Svetlik	(Netherlands) Debby Haak (Belgium) Patty Van Acker	3–6, 6–7
Win	3.	9 February 1998	Mallorca, Spain	Clay	(Germany) Eva Belbl	(Italy) Alice Canepa (Spain) Conchita Martínez Granados	6–3, 6–3
