= Olga Tsarbopoulou =

Greek tennis player

- Country (sports): Greece
- Born: 19 June 1968 (age 56)
- Height: 170 cm (5 ft 7 in)
- Prize money: $45,363

Singles
- Career record: 54–62
- Career titles: 2 ITF
- Highest ranking: No. 117 (29 August 1988)

Grand Slam singles results
- Australian Open: 1R (1988)
- US Open: 1R (1988)

Doubles
- Career record: 13–34
- Career titles: 0
- Highest ranking: No. 218 (15 August 1988)

Grand Slam doubles results
- Australian Open: 2R (1988)

Team competitions
- Fed Cup: 8–23
Medal record
Mediterranean Games
Gold medal – first place	1987 Latakia	Women's Doubles
Bronze medal – third place	1983 Casablanca	Women's Singles

Olga Tsarbopoulou (born 19 June 1968) is a former professional tennis player from Greece.

== Biography ==
Tsarbopoulou was 15, when she began competing for the Greece Fed Cup team in 1983.

She was a bronze medalist in the singles event at the 1983 Mediterranean Games in Casablanca and partnered with Angeliki Kanellopoulou to win a women's doubles gold medal when Syria hosted the 1987 Mediterranean Games.

On the WTA Tour, she had her best performances in 1987, when she was a quarterfinalist in Athens and made the round of 16 in Buenos Aires. She reached her career best ranking of 117 in the world in 1988, with main-draw appearances that year at the Australian Open and US Open.

She was a member of the Greece contingent at the 1988 Summer Olympics, appearing in the singles draw, where she lost in the first round to Argentina's Mercedes Paz.

Retiring in 1991, she finished her Fed Cup career having appeared in 18 ties.

== ITF finals ==
$25,000 tournaments
$10,000 tournaments

=== Singles: 4 (2–2) ===
Result	No.	Date	Tournament	Surface	Opponent	Score
Win	1.	2 July 1984	ITF Carpi, Italy	Clay	(Romania) Daniela Moise	7–6, 6–3
Loss	2.	6 April 1987	ITF Caserta, Italy	Clay	(Italy) Laura Lapi	1–6, 3–6
Loss	3.	1 June 1987	ITF Adria, Italy	Clay	(Socialist Federal Republic of Yugoslavia) Karmen Škulj	6–3, 3–6, 3–6
Win	4.	27 June 1988	ITF Brindisi, Italy	Clay	(Italy) Stefania Dalla Valle	6–2, 2–6, 6–3

=== Doubles: 1 (0–1) ===
Result	No.	Date	Tournament	Surface	Partner	Opponents	Score
Loss	1.	6 April 1987	ITF Caserta, Italy	Hard	(West Germany) Heike Thoms	(Soviet Union) Eugenia Maniokova (Soviet Union) Natalia Medvedeva	3–6, 5–7
