= Sabrina Goleš =

Croatian tennis player

- Country (sports): Yugoslavia
- Born: 3 June 1965 (age 61) Stari Mikanovci, SR Croatia, SFR Yugoslavia
- Turned pro: 1983
- Retired: 1990
- Prize money: US$353,941

Singles
- Career record: 102–109
- Career titles: 1
- Highest ranking: No. 27 (2 February 1987)

Grand Slam singles results
- Australian Open: 1R (1990)
- French Open: 4R (1984)
- Wimbledon: 2R (1987)
- US Open: 3R (1989)

Other tournaments
- Olympic Games: F (1984, demonstration) 1988 Seoul won against Aranxta Sanchez, lost to Sabatini

Doubles
- Career record: 87–91
- Career titles: 3
- Highest ranking: No. 55 (19 January 1987)

Grand Slam doubles results
- Australian Open: 3R (1990)
- French Open: 3R (1984)
- Wimbledon: 1R (1984, 1985, 1989, 1990)
- US Open: 3R (1986)

Sabrina Goleš (born 3 June 1965) is a former Yugoslav tennis player.

== Biography ==
Sabrina Goleš was ranked no. 3 among juniors in the world in 1983 (in the juniors, she won the Italian Open and Rolex Port Washington, reached the semifinals at Roland Garros and the Orange Bowl, and the quarterfinals at the US Open).

Goleš competed for SFR Yugoslavia at the 1984 Los Angeles Olympics, where she made it to the finals, losing 6–1, 3–6, 4–6 to Steffi Graf. The same year, Goleš was part of the Yugoslav team that reached the Federation Cup semifinals.

In 1987, Goleš won the WTA tournament in Paris and four titles in doubles. She also competed in 1988 Olympic Games in Seoul where she beat Arantxa Sánchez Vicario.

Goleš has career wins over top 10 players Kathleen Horvath, Arantxa Sánchez Vicario, Claudia Kohde-Kilsch, Bettina Bunge, Kathy Rinaldi, Lisa Bonder, Katerina Maleeva, Manuela Maleeva, Carling Bassett, Hana Mandlíková, Andrea Temesvári, Nathalie Tauziat, and Virginia Wade.

Goleš was the captain of the Fed Cup team of Yugoslavia and coached the Fed Cup team of Croatia from 1992 to 1994.

== WTA Tour finals ==
=== Singles 4 (1–3) ===
Legend
Grand Slam	0
WTA Championships	0
Tier I	0
Tier II	0
Tier III	0
Tier IV & V	0
Olympic Games	0

Result	W/L	Date	Tournament	Surface	Opponent	Score
Loss	0–1	Apr 1984	Taranto, Italy	Clay	(Italy) Sandra Cecchini	3–6, 5–7
Loss	0–2	Aug 1984	Los Angeles Olympics, US	Hard	(West Germany) Steffi Graf	6–1, 3–6, 4–6
Loss	0–3	Nov 1986	San Juan, Puerto Rico	Hard	(Italy) Raffaella Reggi	6–7, 6–4, 3–6
Win	1–3	Oct 1987	Paris, France	Clay	(Belgium) Sandra Wasserman	7–5, 6–1

=== Doubles 8 (3–5) ===
Legend
Grand Slam	0
WTA Championships	0
Tier I	0
Tier II	0
Tier III	0
Tier IV & V	2
Olympic Games	0

Titles by surface
Hard	0
Clay	2
Grass	0
Carpet	1

Result	W/L	Date	Tournament	Surface	Partner	Opponents	Score
Loss	0–1	Nov 1985	Hilversum, Netherlands	Carpet	(Italy) Sandra Cecchini	(Netherlands) Marcella Mesker (France) Catherine Tanvier	2–6, 2–6
Win	1–1	Apr 1986	Wild Dunes, US	Clay	(Italy) Sandra Cecchini	(Peru) Laura Gildemeister (Czechoslovakia) Marcela Skuherská	4–6, 6–0, 6–3
Loss	1–2	Oct 1987	Paris, France	Clay	(Italy) Sandra Cecchini	(France) Isabelle Demongeot (France) Nathalie Tauziat	6–1, 3–6, 3–6
Win	2–2	Aug 1988	Athens, Greece	Clay	(Austria) Judith Wiesner	(West Germany) Silke Frankl (West Germany) Sabine Hack	7–5, 6–0
Loss	2–3	Aug 1988	Sofia, Bulgaria	Hard	(Bulgaria) Katerina Maleeva	(Spain) Conchita Martínez (Austria) Barbara Paulus	6–1, 1–6, 4–6
Win	3–3	May 1989	Taranto, Italy	Clay	(Argentina) Mercedes Paz	(France) Sophie Amiach (France) Emmanuelle Derly	6–2, 6–2
Loss	3–4	Jul 1989	Båstad, Sweden	Clay	(Bulgaria) Katerina Maleeva	(Argentina) Mercedes Paz (Denmark) Tine Scheuer-Larsen	2–6, 5–7
Loss	3–5	Apr 1990	Barcelona, Spain	Clay	(Argentina) Patricia Tarabini	(Argentina) Mercedes Paz (Spain) Arantxa Sánchez Vicario	7–6, 2–6, 1–6

== ITF Circuit finals ==
$25,000 tournaments
$10,000 tournaments

=== Singles (1–2) ===
Result	No.	Date	Tournament	Surface	Opponent	Score
Loss	1.	28 March 1983	Taranto, Italy	Clay	(Italy) Sandra Cecchini	7–6, 6–7, 3–6
Loss	2.	4 April 1983	Caserta, Italy	Clay	(Italy) Sandra Cecchini	6–2, 6–7, 2–6
Win	3.	18 April 1983	Bari, Italy	Clay	(Australia) Elizabeth Minter	1–6, 7–5, 6–3

=== Doubles (0–2) ===
Result	No.	Date	Tournament	Surface	Partner	Opponents	Score
Loss	1.	28 March 1983	Taranto, Italy	Clay	(Socialist Federal Republic of Yugoslavia) Renata Šašak	(Australia) Elizabeth Minter (Australia) Bernadette Randall	5–7, 1–6
Loss	2.	18 April 1983	Bari, Italy	Clay	(Socialist Federal Republic of Yugoslavia) Renata Šašak	(Australia) Elizabeth Minter (Australia) Anne Minter	4–6, 2–6

== Grand Slam singles performance timeline ==
Key
W	F	SF	QF	#R	RR	Q#	DNQ	A	NH

(W) winner; (F) finalist; (SF) semifinalist; (QF) quarterfinalist; (#R) rounds 4, 3, 2, 1; (RR) round-robin stage; (Q#) qualification round; (DNQ) did not qualify; (A) absent; (NH) not held; (SR) strike rate (events won / competed); (W–L) win–loss record.

Tournament	1983	1984	1985	1986	1987	1988	1989	1990	Career SR
Australian Open	A	A	A	NH	A	A	A	1R	0 / 1
French Open	2R	4R	1R	1R	1R	1R	1R	1R	0 / 8
Wimbledon	A	1R	1R	1R	2R	1R	1R	A	0 / 6
US Open	2R	1R	2R	1R	2R	2R	3R	A	0 / 7
SR	0 / 2	0 / 3	0 / 3	0 / 3	0 / 3	0 / 3	0 / 3	0 / 2	0 / 22
Year-end ranking	110	55	54	30	64	59	105	203	
