= Athens Trophy =

Defunct tennis tournament
- Event name: Athens Trophy
- Tour: WTA Tour
- Founded: 1986
- Abolished: 1990
- Editions: 5
- Location: Athens, Greece
- Venue: Athens Lawn Tennis Club
- Surface: Clay

The Athens Trophy is a defunct WTA Tour affiliated tennis tournament held annually in Athens in Greece from 1986 to 1990, played on outdoor clay courts at Athens Lawn Tennis Club. In 1990 the tournament was classed as a Tier V event. In 2008 the tournament was renewed under the new name of the Vogue Athens Open, an ITF $100,000 tournament. The WTA Tour returned to Athens in 2026 with the Athens Open.

== Finals ==
=== Singles ===
Year	Champions	Runners-up	Score
1986	(West Germany) Sylvia Hanika	(Greece) Angeliki Kanellopoulou	7–5, 6–1
1987	(Bulgaria) Katerina Maleeva	(France) Julie Halard	6–0, 6–1
1988	(West Germany) Isabel Cueto	(Italy) Laura Golarsa	6–0, 6–1
1989	(Sweden) Cecilia Dahlman	(Australia) Rachel McQuillan	6–3, 1–6, 7–5
1990	(Sweden) Cecilia Dahlman	(Italy) Katia Piccolini	7–5, 7–5

=== Doubles ===
Year	Champions	Runners-up	Score
1986	(West Germany) Isabel Cueto (Spain) Arantxa Sánchez	(West Germany) Silke Meier (West Germany) Wiltrud Probst	4–6, 6–2, 6–4
1987	(West Germany) Andrea Betzner (Austria) Judith Wiesner	(United States) Kathleen Horvath (South Africa) Dianne Van Rensburg	6–4, 7–6
1988	(Socialist Federal Republic of Yugoslavia) Sabrina Goleš (Austria) Judith Wiesner	(West Germany) Silke Frankl (West Germany) Sabine Hack	7–5, 6–0
1989	(Italy) Sandra Cecchini (Argentina) Patricia Tarabini	(West Germany) Silke Meier (Bulgaria) Elena Pampoulova	4–6, 6–4, 6–2
1990	(Italy) Laura Garrone (Austria) Karin Kschwendt	(Czechoslovakia) Leona Lásková (Czechoslovakia) Jana Pospíšilová	6–0, 1–6, 7–6

== See also ==
- ATP Athens Open – men's tournament
