= Judith Wiesner =

Austrian tennis player

- Country (sports): Austria
- Residence: Mattsee, Austria
- Born: 2 March 1966 (age 59); Hallein, Austria
- Height: 1.72 m (5 ft 7 1/2 in)
- Turned pro: 1983
- Retired: 1997
- Plays: Right-handed (one handed-backhand)
- Prize money: US$ 1,730,734

Singles
- Career record: 366–209
- Career titles: 5
- Highest ranking: No. 12 (13 January 1997)

Grand Slam singles results
- Australian Open: 4R (1989)
- French Open: 4R (1993)
- Wimbledon: QF (1996)
- US Open: QF (1996)
- Olympic Games: 2R (Atlanta 1996)

Doubles
- Career record: 109–100
- Career titles: 3
- Highest ranking: No. 29 (3 July 1989)

Judith Wiesner (née Pölzl; born 2 March 1966) is an Austrian former professional tennis player. During her career, she won five top-level singles titles and three tour doubles titles. Her career high rankings were world No. 12 in singles (in 1997), and No. 29 in doubles (in 1989). In 1996, Wiesner was a quarterfinalist at both Wimbledon and the US Open.

== Fed Cup ==
Wiesner played her first match for the Austria Federation Cup team in 1983, and her last match in the Fed Cup in 1997. All together, she played in 14 different years, which is the most played by any player for Austria. She also holds the Austrian Fed Cup records for the most wins, the most singles wins, the most doubles wins jointly with Barbara Schett, and the most ties played.

== Post-tennis ==
Initially, Wiesner turned her hand to golf, achieving a handicap of 2. She was the team captain of Austria's Fed Cup team for 2001. She married Roland Floimair in 2001. From 1999 until 2004 she was a member of the Salzburg city council for the Austrian People's Party (ÖVP). She is also the tournament ambassador for the Gastein Ladies event.

== WTA Tour finals ==
=== Singles: 12 (5–7) ===
Winner – Legend Grand Slam tournaments (0–0) WTA Tour Championships (0–0) Tier I (0–1) Tier II (0–0) Tier III (1–2) Tier IV (2–3) Tier V (2–1)	Titles by surface Hard (1–2) Grass (0–0) Clay (4–5) Carpet (0–0)

Result	No.	Date	Tournament	Surface	Opponent	Score
Loss	1.	May 1988	Strasbourg	Clay	(Italy) Sandra Cecchini	3–6, 0–6
Win	1.	Jul 1988	Aix-en-Provence	Clay	(West Germany) Sylvia Hanika	6–1, 6–2
Win	2.	Jul 1989	Arcachon	Clay	(Austria) Barbara Paulus	6–3, 6–7^{(3–7)}, 6–1
Loss	2.	Mar 1990	Key Biscayne	Hard	(Socialist Federal Republic of Yugoslavia) Monica Seles	1–6, 2–6
Loss	3.	Jul 1991	Kitzbühel	Clay	(Spain) Conchita Martínez	1–6, 6–2, 3–6
Win	3.	May 1992	Strasbourg	Clay	(Japan) Naoko Sawamatsu	6–1, 6–3
Loss	4.	May 1993	Strasbourg	Clay	(Japan) Naoko Sawamatsu	6–4, 1–6, 3–6
Loss	5.	Jul 1993	Kitzbühel	Clay	(Germany) Anke Huber	4–6, 1–6
Loss	6.	Jul 1994	Styria	Clay	(Germany) Anke Huber	3–6, 3–6
Win	4.	Aug 1994	Schenectady	Hard	(Latvia) Larisa Neiland	7–5, 3–6, 6–4
Win	5.	Jul 1995	Maria Lankowitz	Clay	(Romania) Ruxandra Dragomir	7–6^{(7–4)}, 6–3
Loss	7.	Dec 1996	Auckland	Hard	(Austria) Marion Maruska	3–6, 1–6

=== Doubles: 9 (3–6) ===
Winner – Legend Grand Slam tournaments (0–0) WTA Tour Championships (0–0) Tier I (0–0) Tier II (0–0) Tier III (0–4) Tier IV (0–1) Tier V (2–1) Virginia Slims (1–0)	Titles by surface Hard (0–0) Grass (0–0) Clay (3–4) Carpet (0–2)

Result	No.	Date	Tournament	Surface	Partner	Opponents	Score
Win	1.	Oct 1987	Athens	Clay	(West Germany) Andrea Betzner	(United States) Kathy Horvath (South Africa) Dinky Van Rensburg	6–4, 7–6^{(7–0)}
Loss	1.	Jul 1988	Hamburg	Clay	(West Germany) Andrea Betzner	(Czechoslovakia) Jana Novotná (Denmark) Tine Scheuer-Larsen	4–6, 2–6
Win	2.	Aug 1988	Athens	Clay	(Socialist Federal Republic of Yugoslavia) Sabrina Goleš	(West Germany) Silke Frankl (West Germany) Sabine Hack	7–5, 6–0
Loss	2.	Apr 1989	Barcelona	Clay	(Spain) Arantxa Sánchez Vicario	(Czechoslovakia) Jana Novotná (Denmark) Tine Scheuer-Larsen	2–6, 6–2, 6–7^{(3–7)}
Win	3.	May 1989	Strasbourg	Clay	(Argentina) Mercedes Paz	(South Africa) Lise Gregory (United States) Gretchen Magers	6–3, 6–3
Loss	3.	Oct 1989	Zürich	Carpet (I)	(France) Nathalie Tauziat	(Czechoslovakia) Jana Novotná (Czechoslovakia) Helena Suková	3–6, 6–3, 4–6
Loss	4.	Apr 1991	Barcelona	Clay	(France) Nathalie Tauziat	(United States) Martina Navratilova (Spain) Arantxa Sánchez Vicario	1–6, 3–6
Loss	5.	Apr 1992	Barcelona	Clay	(France) Nathalie Tauziat	(Spain) Conchita Martínez (Spain) Arantxa Sánchez Vicario	4–6, 1–6
Loss	6.	Feb 1993	Linz	Carpet (I)	(Spain) Conchita Martínez	(Russia) Eugenia Maniokova (Georgia (country)) Leila Meskhi	w/o

== ITF Circuit finals ==
=== Singles (3–2) ===
$75,000 tournaments
$25,000 tournaments
$10,000 tournaments

Outcome	No.	Date	Tournament	Surface	Opponent	Score
Runner-up	1.	10 August 1986	Kitzbuehl, Austria	Clay	(Austria) Petra Huber	6–3, 2–6, 0–6
Runner-up	2.	2 August 1987	Kitzbuehl, Austria	Clay	(Austria) Petra Huber	3–6, 6–3, 1–6
Winner	1.	14 August 1991	Turin, Italy	Clay	(Italy) Cecilia Bargagni	6–2, 6–4
Winner	2.	20 September 1992	Karlovy Vary, Czech Republic	Clay	(Czech Republic) Helena Suková	6–4, 7–5
Winner	3.	17 May 1993	Karlovy Vary, Czech Republic	Clay	(Slovakia) Janette Husárová	6–3, 7–5

=== Doubles (1–1) ===
Outcome	No.	Date	Tournament	Surface	Partner	Opponents	Score
Runner-up	1.	10 August 1986	Kitzbuhel, Austria	Clay	(Austria) Heidi Sprung	(Australia) Justine Brown (Australia) Louise Pleming	0–6, 0–6
Winner	1.	2 August 1987	Kitzbuhel, Austria	Clay	(Austria) Heidi Sprung	(Austria) Bettina Diesner (Austria) Karin Oberleitner	6–3, 6–4

== Grand Slam singles performance timeline ==
Key
W	F	SF	QF	#R	RR	Q#	DNQ	A	NH

(W) winner; (F) finalist; (SF) semifinalist; (QF) quarterfinalist; (#R) rounds 4, 3, 2, 1; (RR) round-robin stage; (Q#) qualification round; (DNQ) did not qualify; (A) absent; (NH) not held; (SR) strike rate (events won / competed); (W–L) win–loss record.

Tournament	1986	1987	1988	1989	1990	1991	1992	1993	1994	1995	1996	1997	Career SR
Australian Open	NH	3R	A	4R	2R	A	2R	1R	A	3R	1R	1R	0 / 8
French Open	A	2R	1R	1R	3R	1R	3R	4R	2R	1R	1R	1R	0 / 11
Wimbledon	A	2R	1R	3R	4R	4R	3R	2R	1R	3R	QF	3R	0 / 11
US Open	A	1R	4R	1R	4R	4R	2R	3R	3R	1R	QF	A	0 / 10
SR	0 / 0	0 / 4	0 / 3	0 / 4	0 / 4	0 / 3	0 / 4	0 / 4	0 / 3	0 / 4	0 / 4	0 / 3	0 / 40
Year-end ranking	141	33	33	35	17	16	25	21	25	25	15	NR	

== Best Grand Slam results details ==
	Australian Open	
1989 Australian Open
Round	Opponent	Score
1R	(Switzerland) Sandrine Jaquet	6–3, 6–3
2R	(France) Emmanuelle Derly	6–1, 6–2
3R	(United States) Ronni Reis	6–4, 6–4
4R	(Sweden) Catarina Lindqvist	5–7, 2–6

	French Open	
1993 French Open
Round	Opponent	Score
1R	(United States) Lindsay Davenport	6–3, 6–1
2R	(United States) Jennifer Santrock	6–1, 6–3
3R	(France) Nathalie Tauziat (13)	6–3, 7–6^{(7–5)}
4R	(Spain) Conchita Martínez (4)	3–6, 3–6

	Wimbledon Championships	
1996 Wimbledon
Round	Opponent	Score
1R	(Slovakia) Karina Habšudová (17)	6–0, 7–5
2R	(Argentina) Mercedes Paz (Q)	6–2, 6–3
3R	(United States) Gigi Fernández	6–2, 7–5
4R	(United States) Amy Frazier	6–4, 6–4
QF	(Spain) Arantxa Sánchez Vicario (4)	4–6, 0–6

	US Open	
1996 US Open
Round	Opponent	Score
1R	(Croatia) Iva Majoli (5)	2–6, 6–3, 6–1
2R	(United States) Debbie Graham (Q)	6–2, 7–5
3R	(Czech Republic) Petra Langrová	6–2, 6–0
4R	(Italy) Rita Grande	6–0, 6–3
QF	(Germany) Steffi Graf (1)	5–7, 3–6

Awards
Preceded by (Argentina) Mercedes Paz	Karen Krantzcke Sportsmanship Award; 1991	Succeeded by (Canada) Jill Hetherington
