= Isabel Cueto =

German tennis player

- Country (sports): Germany
- Born: 3 December 1968 (age 56); Kehl, West Germany
- Turned pro: 1983
- Retired: 1994
- Plays: Right Handed (one-handed backhand)
- Prize money: US$ 404,418

Singles
- Career record: 193–132
- Career titles: 5 WTA, 4 ITF
- Highest ranking: No. 20 (28 August 1989)

Grand Slam singles results
- Australian Open: 2R (1991)
- French Open: 3R (1985, 1990)
- Wimbledon: 2R (1988)
- US Open: 3R (1987, 1988)

Doubles
- Career record: 23–43
- Career titles: 1 WTA
- Highest ranking: No. 77 (14 September 1987)

Grand Slam doubles results
- French Open: 3R (1987)
- Wimbledon: 1R (1988)
- US Open: 2R (1987)

Team competitions
- Fed Cup: 3–1

Isabel Cueto (born 3 December 1968) is a retired professional tennis player from Germany. Her career-high ranking was No. 20, which she achieved in 1989.

== Early life ==
Isabel Cueto was born in Kehl to her father, Toni, an electrical engineer who had immigrated from Bolivia, and her mother, Jutta, a German. She grew up in Aspach and attended school in Backnang.

== Career ==
In 1984, Cueto became the youngest German national champion, winning the final against Elke Renz. She also won the German championship in 1986 and 1987.

Cueto won a total of six titles on the main WTA Tour over the course of her career; five in singles, one in doubles. She also won four titles on the ITF Women's Circuit. She progressed to the third round at the French Open (1985, 1990) and the US Open (1987, 1988), her best finishes at Grand Slam events.

She represented the Germany Fed Cup team four times from 1988 to 1990, playing all four matches in doubles ties. Her win–loss record was 3–1.

== After tennis ==
Cueto trained for a teaching career at the Ludwigsburg University of Education and teaches at the Matern-Feuerbacher Realschule in Großbottwar. She married Oliver Baumann, and they have two children, Ines and Eric.

== WTA finals ==
=== Singles (5–3) ===
Legend
WTA Championships
Tier I
Tier II
Tier III
Tier IV-V

Result	W/L	Date	Tournament	Surface	Opponent	Score
Loss	0–1	Sep 1987	Hamburg, West Germany	Clay	(West Germany) Steffi Graf	2–6, 2–6
Loss	0–2	Nov 1987	Buenos Aires, Argentina	Clay	(Argentina) Gabriela Sabatini	0–6, 1–6
Win	1–2	Jul 1988	Båstad, Sweden	Clay	(Italy) Sandra Cecchini	7–5, 6–1
Win	2–2	Aug 1988	Athens, Greece	Clay	(Italy) Laura Golarsa	6–0, 6–1
Win	3–2	Jul 1989	Estoril, Portugal	Clay	(Italy) Sandra Cecchini	7–6^{(7–3)}, 6–2
Win	4–2	Jul 1989	Sofia, Bulgaria	Clay	(Bulgaria) Katerina Maleeva	6–2, 7–6^{(7–3)}
Loss	4–3	Apr 1990	Barcelona, Spain	Clay	(Spain) Arantxa Sánchez Vicario	7–6^{(7–3)}, 6–2
Win	5–3	Jul 1990	Palermo, Italy	Clay	(Austria) Barbara Paulus	6–2, 6–3

=== Doubles (1–0) ===
Result	W/L	Date	Tournament	Surface	Partner	Opponents	Score
Win	1–0	Sep 1986	Athens, Greece	Clay	(Spain) Arantxa Sánchez	(West Germany) Silke Meier (West Germany) Wiltrud Probst	4–6, 6–2, 6–4

== ITF finals ==
=== Singles (4–2) ===
Legend
$50,000 tournaments
$25,000 tournaments
$10,000 tournaments

Result	No.	Date	Tournament	Surface	Opponent	Score
Win	1.	8 October 1984	Valencia, Spain	Clay	(Spain) Michelle Garth	6–2, 7–5
Loss	2.	22 October 1984	Eilat, Israel	Hard	(West Germany) Gabriela Dinu	6–4, 5–7, 2–6
Win	3.	3 July 1989	Vaihingen, West Germany	Clay	(West Germany) Silke Frankl	6–1, 6–1
Win	4.	4 March 1991	Granada, Spain	Clay	(China) Li Fang	6–3, 6–3
Win	5.	30 March 1992	Moncalier, Italy	Clay	(Spain) Virginia Ruano Pascual	6–3, 6–2
Loss	6.	11 July 1993	Erlangen, Germany	Clay	(Israel) Anna Smashnova	3–6, 1–6
