= 1988 WTA Aix-en-Provence Open – Singles =

Singles
- 1988 WTA Aix-en-Provence Open

Final
- Champion: (Austria) Judith Wiesner
- Runner-up: (West Germany) Sylvia Hanika
- Score: 6–1, 6–2

Events
Singles	Doubles
← 1987 ·	WTA Aix-en-Provence Open	· 1989 →

Judith Wiesner won in the final 6–1, 6–2 against Sylvia Hanika.

== Seeds ==
A champion seed is indicated in bold text while text in italics indicates the round in which that seed was eliminated. The top eight seeds received a bye to the second round.

1. (West Germany) Sylvia Hanika (final)
2. (Italy) Sandra Cecchini (semifinals)
3. (Italy) Raffaella Reggi (third round)
4. (Spain) Arantxa Sánchez (second round)
5. (Argentina) Bettina Fulco (semifinals)
6. (Austria) **Judith Wiesner (champion)**
7. (West Germany) Isabel Cueto (second round)
8. (France) Nathalie Tauziat (third round)
9. (Argentina) Patricia Tarabini (third round)
10. (Brazil) Neige Dias (quarterfinals)
11. (Socialist Federal Republic of Yugoslavia) Sabrina Goleš (second round)
12. n/a
13. (France) Julie Halard (second round)
14. (France) Nathalie Herreman (first round)
15. n/a
16. n/a

== Draw ==
=== Key ===
- Q = Qualifier
- WC = Wild card
- LL = Lucky loser
- Alt = Alternate
- SE = Special exempt
- PR = Protected ranking
- ITF = ITF entry
- JE = Junior exempt
- w/o = Walkover
- r = Retired
- d = Defaulted
- SR = Special ranking

=== Finals ===
Semifinals
1	(West Germany) **Sylvia Hanika**	**6**	3	**6**
5	(Argentina) Bettina Fulco	4	**6**	4
6	(Austria) **Judith Wiesner**	**6**	3	**6**
2	(Italy) Sandra Cecchini	1	**6**	4

Final
1	(West Germany) Sylvia Hanika	1	2
6	(Austria) **Judith Wiesner**	**6**	**6**

=== Top half ===
==== Section 1 ====
First round
(Brazil) L Corsato	2	3
(France) **A Dechaume**	**6**	**6**
(Netherlands) H ter Riet	3	2
(United States) **M Torres**	**6**	**6**
(West Germany) S Frankl	3	4
(Czechoslovakia) **D Krajčovičová**	**6**	**6**
14	(France) N Herreman	3	**6**	4
(Argentina) **A Villagrán**	**6**	3	**6**
(Netherlands) S Schilder	4	1
(France) **N Guerrée**	**6**	**6**
(Czechoslovakia) **M Frimmelová**	1	**6**	**6**
(Italy) F Bonsignori	**6**	3	4

Second round
1	(West Germany) **S Hanika**	**6**	**6**
(France) A Dechaume	2	1
(United States) M Torres	5	3
(Czechoslovakia) **D Krajčovičová**	**7**	**6**
(Argentina) A Villagrán	4	4
(France) **N Guerrée**	**6**	**6**
(Czechoslovakia) M Frimmelová	0	**7**	1
8	(France) **N Tauziat**	**6**	5	**6**

Third round
1	(West Germany) **S Hanika**	**6**	**7**
(Czechoslovakia) D Krajčovičová	2	5
(France) **N Guerrée**	**6**	4	**6**
8	(France) N Tauziat	3	**6**	3

Quarterfinals
1	(West Germany) **S Hanika**	**6**	**6**
(France) N Guerrée	3	1

==== Section 2 ====
First round
(Brazil) A Vieira	4	**6**	3
(France) **M Laval**	**6**	3	**6**
(France) C Tanvier	3	1
(Czechoslovakia) **I Budařová**	**6**	**6**
(France) V Paquet	3	**6**	5
(France) **M-C Calleja**	**6**	4	**7**
9	(Argentina) **P Tarabini**	**6**	2	**6**
(France) K Quentrec	4	**6**	3
(France) M Phan Thanh	6	1
(Netherlands) **M Mesker**	**7**	**6**
(Netherlands) **N Jagerman**	**6**	**6**
(Australia) L O'Neill	1	1

Second round
3	(Italy) **R Reggi**	**6**	**6**
(France) M Laval	1	2
(Czechoslovakia) **I Budařová**	**6**	**6**
(France) M-C Calleja	1	4
9	(Argentina) **P Tarabini**	**6**	**6**
(Netherlands) M Mesker	3	4
(Netherlands) N Jagerman	5	4
5	(Argentina) **B Fulco**	**7**	**6**

Third round
3	(Italy) R Reggi	4	3
(Czechoslovakia) **I Budařová**	**6**	**6**
9	(Argentina) P Tarabini	5	**6**	r
5	(Argentina) **B Fulco**	**7**	2

Quarterfinals
(Czechoslovakia) I Budařová	1	1
5	(Argentina) **B Fulco**	**6**	**6**

=== Bottom half ===
==== Section 3 ====
First round
(Italy) S La Fratta	2	4
(Czechoslovakia) **R Rajchrtová**	**6**	**6**
(West Germany) H Thoms	3	3
(South Africa) **A Coetzer**	**6**	**6**
(Norway) A Jönsson	2	2
11	(Socialist Federal Republic of Yugoslavia) **S Goleš**	**6**	**6**
10	(Brazil) **N Dias**	**6**	**6**
(United States) E Galphin	1	1
(Czechoslovakia) **R Maršíková**	**7**	**6**
(West Germany) A Betzner	5	4
(France) **S Niox-Chateau**	**6**	**7**
(Brazil) P Medrado	2	5

Second round
6	(Austria) **J Wiesner**	**7**	**6**
(Czechoslovakia) R Rajchrtová	6	4
(South Africa) **A Coetzer**	**6**	**7**
11	(Socialist Federal Republic of Yugoslavia) S Goleš	4	5
10	(Brazil) **N Dias**	**6**	**6**
(Czechoslovakia) R Maršíková	3	3
(France) **S Niox-Chateau**	**6**	**6**
4	(Spain) A Sánchez	3	4

Third round
6	(Austria) **J Wiesner**	**6**	3	**6**
(South Africa) A Coetzer	4	**6**	1
10	(Brazil) **N Dias**	**6**	**6**
(France) S Niox-Chateau	2	4

Quarterfinals
6	(Austria) **J Wiesner**	**6**	**6**
10	(Brazil) N Dias	1	3

==== Section 4 ====
First round
(Spain) **C Martínez**	**6**	**6**
(Switzerland) C Cohen	3	1
(West Germany) S Auer	1	0
(France) **C Bonnet**	**6**	**6**
(Italy) C Caverzasio	**6**	1	4
13	(France) **J Halard**	3	**6**	**6**
(United States) G Kim	2	2
(France) **E Derly**	**6**	**6**
(West Germany) **W Probst**	**6**	**6**
(United Kingdom) S Loosemore	2	3
(Czechoslovakia) J Pospíšilová	4	5
(Socialist Federal Republic of Yugoslavia) **M Jaušovec**	**6**	**7**

Second round
7	(West Germany) I Cueto	6	1
(Spain) **C Martínez**	**7**	**6**
(France) **C Bonnet**	**6**	5	**7**
13	(France) J Halard	4	**7**	6
(France) E Derly	**6**	4	3
(West Germany) **W Probst**	1	**6**	**6**
(Socialist Federal Republic of Yugoslavia) M Jaušovec	1	1
2	(Italy) **S Cecchini**	**6**	**6**

Third round
(Spain) **C Martínez**	**6**	3	**6**
(France) C Bonnet	3	**6**	2
(West Germany) W Probst	1	6
2	(Italy) **S Cecchini**	**6**	**7**

Quarterfinals
(Spain) C Martínez	3	1
2	(Italy) **S Cecchini**	**6**	**6**
