= 1988 WTA Aix-en-Provence Open – Doubles =

Doubles
- 1988 WTA Aix-en-Provence Open

Final
- Champions: (France) Nathalie Herreman (France) Catherine Tanvier
- Runners-up: (Italy) Sandra Cecchini (Spain) Arantxa Sánchez
- Score: 6–4, 7–5

Events
Singles	Doubles
← 1987 ·	WTA Aix-en-Provence Open	· 1989 →

The 1988 WTA Aix-en-Provence Open doubles was a division of the 1988 WTA Aix-en-Provence Open. Nathalie Herreman and Catherine Tanvier were the defending champions and won in the final 6–4, 7–5 against Sandra Cecchini and Arantxa Sánchez.

== Seeds ==
Champion seeds are indicated in bold text while text in italics indicates the round in which those seeds were eliminated. All eight seeded teams received byes into the second round.

1. (France) **Nathalie Herreman** / (France) **Catherine Tanvier (champions)**
2. (Italy) Sandra Cecchini / (Spain) Arantxa Sánchez (final)
3. (Socialist Federal Republic of Yugoslavia) Sabrina Goleš / (Argentina) Patricia Tarabini (second round)
4. (France) Julie Halard / (France) Nathalie Tauziat (second round)
5. (Netherlands) Ingelise Driehuis / (Netherlands) Marcella Mesker (quarterfinals)
6. (West Germany) Andrea Betzner / (West Germany) Wiltrud Probst (second round)
7. (Brazil) Neige Dias / (Austria) Judith Wiesner (quarterfinals)
8. (France) Alexia Dechaume / (France) Emmanuelle Derly (semifinals)

== Draw ==
=== Key ===
- Q = Qualifier
- WC = Wild card
- LL = Lucky loser
- Alt = Alternate
- SE = Special exempt
- PR = Protected ranking
- ITF = ITF entry
- JE = Junior exempt
- w/o = Walkover
- r = Retired
- d = Defaulted
- SR = Special ranking

=== Final ===
Final

1
- (France) **Nathalie Herreman**
- (France) **Catherine Tanvier**
**6**
**7**

2
- (Italy) Sandra Cecchini
- (Spain) Arantxa Sánchez
4
5

=== Top half ===
First round

Second round

Quarterfinals

Semifinals

1
- (France) **N Herreman**
- (France) **C Tanvier**
**6**
**6**

- (France) M Laval
- (France) K Quentrec
**6**
6
2

- (Italy) F Bonsignori
- (France) V Paquet
2
1

- (Italy) **F Bonsignori**
- (France) **V Paquet**
1
**7**
**6**

1
- (France) **N Herreman**
- (France) **C Tanvier**
6
**6**
**6**

- (Czechoslovakia) **I Budařová**
- (Brazil) **P Medrado**
**6**
**6**

- (Czechoslovakia) I Budařová
- (Brazil) P Medrado
**7**
4
3

- (Brazil) L Corsato
- (Argentina) G Mosca
4
3

- (Czechoslovakia) **I Budařová**
- (Brazil) **P Medrado**
2
**6**
**6**

6
- (West Germany) A Betzner
- (West Germany) W Probst
**6**
4
2

1
- (France) **N Herreman**
- (France) **C Tanvier**
**6**
**6**

8
- (France) A Dechaume
- (France) E Derly
2
3

3
(Socialist Federal Republic of Yugoslavia) S Goleš
(Argentina) P Tarabini

- (Czechoslovakia) **D Krajčovičová**
- (Czechoslovakia) **J Pospíšilová**
**6**
**7**

- (Czechoslovakia) **D Krajčovičová**
- (Czechoslovakia) **J Pospíšilová**
**w/o**

- (United States) L Spadea
- (Brazil) A Vieira
1
6

- (Czechoslovakia) D Krajčovičová
- (Czechoslovakia) J Pospíšilová
2
3

- (Norway) A Jönsson
- (United States) M Torres
1
**7**
4

8
- (France) **A Dechaume**
- (France) **E Derly**
**6**
**6**

- (Australia) **L O'Neill**
- (Netherlands) **S Schilder**
**6**
5
**6**

- (Australia) L O'Neill
- (Netherlands) S Schilder
3
6

8
- (France) **A Dechaume**
- (France) **E Derly**
**6**
**7**

=== Bottom half ===
First round

Second round

Quarterfinals

Semifinals

5
- (Netherlands) **I Driehuis**
- (Netherlands) **M Mesker**
**6**
**6**

- (Italy) **C Caverzasio**
- (Italy) **S La Fratta**
**6**
**6**

- (Italy) C Caverzasio
- (Italy) S La Fratta
2
2

- (South Africa) A Coetzer
- (West Germany) H Thoms
4
4

5
- (Netherlands) I Driehuis
- (Netherlands) M Mesker
**6**
3
6

- (Czechoslovakia) M Frimmelová
- (Czechoslovakia) R Rajchrtová
4
1

- (United States) **S Martin**
- (France) **V Paquet**
3
**6**
**7**

- (United States) **S Martin**
- (France) **V Paquet**
**6**
**6**

- (United States) **S Martin**
- (France) **V Paquet**
**6**
**6**

4
- (France) J Halard
- (France) N Tauziat
4
3

- (United States) S Martin
- (France) V Paquet
1
1

2
- (Italy) **S Cecchini**
- (Spain) **A Sánchez**
**6**
**6**

7
- (Brazil) **N Dias**
- (Austria) **J Wiesner**
**6**
**6**

- (United States) G Kim
- (United Kingdom) S Loosemore
3
3

(Socialist Federal Republic of Yugoslavia) M Jaušovec
(Czechoslovakia) R Maršíková
0
2

(Socialist Federal Republic of Yugoslavia) **M Jaušovec**
(Czechoslovakia) **R Maršíková**
**6**
**6**

7
- (Brazil) N Dias
- (Austria) J Wiesner
4
5

- (France) C Bonnet
- (France) N Guerrée
**7**
3
3

2
- (Italy) **S Cecchini**
- (Spain) **A Sánchez**
**6**
**7**

- (Argentina) **B Fulco**
- (Argentina) **A Villagrán**
6
**6**
**6**

- (Argentina) B Fulco
- (Argentina) A Villagrán
2
4

2
- (Italy) **S Cecchini**
- (Spain) **A Sánchez**
**6**
**6**
