= 1988 Open Clarins – Singles =

Singles
- 1988 Open Clarins
- 1987 Champion: (Socialist Federal Republic of Yugoslavia) Sabrina Goleš

Final
- Champion: (Czechoslovakia) Petra Langrová
- Runner-up: (Belgium) Sandra Wasserman
- Score: 7–6^{(7–0)}, 6–2

Events
Singles	Doubles
← 1987 ·	Open Clarins	· 1989 →

Sabrina Goleš was the defending champion but did not compete that year.

Petra Langrová won in the final 7–6^{(7–0)}, 6–2 against Sandra Wasserman.

== Seeds ==
A champion seed is indicated in bold text while text in italics indicates the round in which that seed was eliminated.

1. (France) Julie Halard (second round)
2. (Belgium) Sandra Wasserman (final)
3. (Italy) Linda Ferrando (first round)
4. (Italy) Laura Garrone (quarterfinals)
5. n/a
6. (France) Nathalie Herreman (second round)
7. (Italy) Federica Bonsignori (second round)
8. (France) Alexia Dechaume (first round)

== Draw ==
=== Key ===
- Q = Qualifier
- WC = Wild card
- LL = Lucky loser
- Alt = Alternate
- SE = Special exempt
- PR = Protected ranking
- ITF = ITF entry
- JE = Junior exempt
- w/o = Walkover
- r = Retired
- d = Defaulted
- SR = Special ranking

First round
1	(France) **J Halard**	**6**	**6**
(Austria) P Huber	2	0
Q	(Italy) S Dalla Valle	**6**	3	2
(Czechoslovakia) **J Pospíšilová**	1	**6**	**6**
Q	(Czechoslovakia) **P Langrová**	**6**	**6**
(France) S Niox-Chateau	4	1
(Czechoslovakia) **R Maršíková**	**6**	**7**
8	(France) A Dechaume	4	5
3	(Italy) L Ferrando	3	**6**	1
(Italy) **L Lapi**	**6**	2	**6**
(France) M Laval	3	0
(West Germany) **S Frankl**	**6**	**6**
(Czechoslovakia) H Fukárková	**6**	5	2
(West Germany) **V Martinek**	2	**7**	**6**
(France) **M-C Damas**	**6**	**6**
(France) V Paquet	4	3
7	(Italy) **F Bonsignori**	**6**	**6**
(Czechoslovakia) D Krajčovičová	2	1
(Italy) **C Caverzasio**	**6**	**6**
(France) E Derly	0	1
(Australia) L Field	1	**6**	6
(France) **F Gauvain**	**6**	4	**7**
(France) M-C Calleja	0	3
4	(Italy) **L Garrone**	**6**	**6**
6	(France) **N Herreman**	**6**	**6**
Q	(Sweden) C Dahlman	2	2
(West Germany) **S Hack**	**6**	**6**
Q	(Switzerland) S Jaquet	0	2
(United States) S Mascarin	4	0
(France) **N Guerrée**	**6**	**6**
(Italy) B Romanò	3	0
2	(Belgium) **S Wasserman**	**6**	**6**

Second round
1	(France) J Halard	0	3
(Czechoslovakia) **J Pospíšilová**	**6**	**6**
Q	(Czechoslovakia) **P Langrová**	**6**	**6**
(Czechoslovakia) R Maršíková	2	0
(Italy) **L Lapi**	**7**	**7**
(West Germany) S Frankl	6	5
(West Germany) V Martinek	3	**6**	4
(France) **M-C Damas**	**6**	4	**6**
7	(Italy) F Bonsignori	2	1
(Italy) **C Caverzasio**	**6**	**6**
(France) F Gauvain	2	1
4	(Italy) **L Garrone**	**6**	**6**
6	(France) N Herreman	**7**	0	1
(West Germany) **S Hack**	5	**6**	**6**
(France) N Guerrée	4	4
2	(Belgium) **S Wasserman**	**6**	**6**

Quarterfinals
(Czechoslovakia) J Pospíšilová	**6**	6	2
Q	(Czechoslovakia) **P Langrová**	2	**7**	**6**
(Italy) **L Lapi**	**7**	**6**
(France) M-C Damas	5	4
(Italy) **C Caverzasio**	**6**	5	**6**
4	(Italy) L Garrone	2	**7**	2
(West Germany) S Hack	4	6
2	(Belgium) **S Wasserman**	**6**	**7**

Semifinals
Q	(Czechoslovakia) **P Langrová**	**6**	6	**7**
(Italy) L Lapi	4	**7**	6
(Italy) C Caverzasio	**7**	4	6
2	(Belgium) **S Wasserman**	6	**6**	**7**

Final
Q	(Czechoslovakia) **Petra Langrová**	**7^{7}**	**6**
2	(Belgium) Sandra Wasserman	6^{0}	2
