= 1988 Open Clarins – Doubles =

Doubles
- 1988 Open Clarins
- 1987 Champions: (France) Isabelle Demongeot (France) Nathalie Tauziat

Final
- Champions: (France) Alexia Dechaume (France) Emmanuelle Derly
- Runners-up: (Australia) Louise Field (France) Nathalie Herreman
- Score: 6–0, 6–2

Events
| Singles | Doubles |
| ← 1987 · | Open Clarins | · 1989 → |

Isabelle Demongeot and Nathalie Tauziat were the defending champions but did not compete that year.

Alexia Dechaume and Emmanuelle Derly won in the final 6–0, 6–2 against Louise Field and Nathalie Herreman.

== Seeds ==
Champion seeds are indicated in bold text while text in italics indicates the round in which those seeds were eliminated.

1. (Australia) Louise Field / (France) Nathalie Herreman (final)
2. (France) **Alexia Dechaume** / (France) **Emmanuelle Derly (champions)**
3. (Italy) Linda Ferrando / (Italy) Laura Garrone (first round)
4. (France) Frédérique Martin / (France) Virginie Paquet (quarterfinals)

== Draw ==
=== Key ===
- Q = Qualifier
- WC = Wild card
- LL = Lucky loser
- Alt = Alternate
- SE = Special exempt
- PR = Protected ranking
- ITF = ITF entry
- JE = Junior exempt
- w/o = Walkover
- r = Retired
- d = Defaulted
- SR = Special ranking

First round
1 | (Australia) **L Field** (France) **N Herreman** | 0 | **7** | **6**
(Italy) C Caverzasio (France) J Halard | **6** | 6 | 4
(Austria) P Huber (Czechoslovakia) R Maršíková | 1 | 1
(Czechoslovakia) **M Frimmelová** (Czechoslovakia) **D Krajčovičová** | **6** | **6**
4 | (France) **F Martin** (France) **V Paquet** | **6** | **6**
(France) I Crudo (New Zealand) R Seeman | 4 | 1
(France) **S Sabas** (France) **N van Lottum** | **6** | **6**
(Italy) F Bonsignori (France) F Gauvain | 2 | 1
(Czechoslovakia) **P Langrová** (Czechoslovakia) **J Pospíšilová** | **6** | **6**
(Sweden) C Dahlman (United States) E Galphin | 1 | 1
(United States) **A Grousbeck** (Australia) **T Morton** | 4 | **6** | **6**
3 | (Italy) L Ferrando (Italy) L Garrone | **6** | 3 | 1
(France) N Guerrée (France) N Phan Thanh | 3 | 3
(France) **M Laval** (France) **S Niox-Chateau** | **6** | **6**
(Switzerland) S Jaquet (Italy) B Romanò | **7** | 0 | 1
2 | (France) **A Dechaume** (France) **E Derly** | 6 | **6** | **6**

Quarterfinals
1 | (Australia) **L Field** (France) **N Herreman** | **6** | 5 | **6**
(Czechoslovakia) M Frimmelová (Czechoslovakia) D Krajčovičová | 3 | **7** | 3
4 | (France) F Martin (France) V Paquet | 6 | 5
(France) **S Sabas** (France) **N van Lottum** | **7** | **7**
(Czechoslovakia) **P Langrová** (Czechoslovakia) **J Pospíšilová** | **6** | **6**
(United States) A Grousbeck (Australia) T Morton | 1 | 4
(France) M Laval (France) S Niox-Chateau | 1 | 5
2 | (France) **A Dechaume** (France) **E Derly** | **6** | **7**

Semifinals
1 | (Australia) **L Field** (France) **N Herreman** | **7** | **6**
(France) S Sabas (France) N van Lottum | 5 | 1
(Czechoslovakia) P Langrová (Czechoslovakia) J Pospíšilová | 1 | 1 | r
2 | (France) **A Dechaume** (France) **E Derly** | **6** | **1**

Final
1 | (Australia) Louise Field (France) Nathalie Herreman | 0 | 2
2 | (France) **Alexia Dechaume** (France) **Emmanuelle Derly** | **6** | **6**
