= 1990 Open Clarins – Doubles =

Doubles
- 1990 Open Clarins

Final
- Champions: (Australia) Kristin Godridge (Australia) Kirrily Sharpe
- Runners-up: (France) Alexia Dechaume (France) Nathalie Herreman
- Score: 4–6, 6–3, 6–1

Details
- Draw: 16 (1Alt)
- Seeds: 2

Events
Singles	Doubles
← 1989 ·	Clarins Open	· 1991 →

Sandra Cecchini and Patricia Tarabini were the defending champions, but lost in the first round to Alexia Dechaume and Nathalie Herreman.

Alternates Kristin Godridge and Kirrily Sharpe won the title by defeating Dechaume and Herreman 4–6, 6–3, 6–1 in the final.

== Seeds ==
1. (Italy) Sandra Cecchini / (Argentina) Patricia Tarabini (first round)
2. (France) ~~Isabelle Demongeot~~ / (Australia) ~~Rachel McQuillan~~ (withdrew)

== Draw ==
=== Key ===
- Q = Qualifier
- WC = Wild card
- LL = Lucky loser
- Alt = Alternate
- SE = Special exempt
- PR = Protected ranking
- ITF = ITF entry
- JE = Junior exempt
- w/o = Walkover
- r = Retired
- d = Defaulted
- SR = Special ranking

=== Draw ===
First round
1	(Italy) S Cecchini (Argentina) P Tarabini	6	0	2
(France) A Dechaume (France) N Herreman	2	6	6
(Brazil) C Chabalgoity (Brazil) L Corsato	3	6	6
(Bulgaria) E Pampoulova (Greece) A Kanellopoulou	6	3	0
(Italy) L Garrone (Luxembourg) K Kschwendt	6	7
(Argentina) B Fulco (Belgium) S Wasserman	2	5
(France) J Halard (France) M Pierce	6	1	4
(France) S Sabas (France) S Testud	1	6	6
(Finland) N Dahlman (Switzerland) C Caverzasio	2	2
(Czechoslovakia) P Langrová (Czechoslovakia) J Pospíšilová	6	6
(France) N Ballet (France) Agnes Romand	7	4	3
(Australia) JA Faull (Australia) T Morton	5	6	6
(Czechoslovakia) A Noháčová (Czechoslovakia) R Rajchrtová	6	6
(France) A Fusai (France) O Gravereaux	2	3
(United Kingdom) S Smith (Netherlands) H ter Riet	4	4
Alt	(Australia) K Godridge (Australia) K Sharpe	6	6

Quarterfinals
(France) A Dechaume (France) N Herreman	7^{7}	1	6
(Brazil) C Chabalgoity (Brazil) L Corsato	6^{5}	6	2
(Italy) L Garrone (Luxembourg) K Kschwendt	7^{7}	3	6
(France) S Sabas (France) S Testud	6^{2}	6	4
(Czechoslovakia) P Langrová (Czechoslovakia) J Pospíšilová	6	6
(Australia) JA Faull (Australia) T Morton	2	1
(Czechoslovakia) A Noháčová (Czechoslovakia) R Rajchrtová	2	5
Alt	(Australia) K Godridge (Australia) K Sharpe	6	7

Semifinals
(France) A Dechaume (France) N Herreman	6^{2}	7^{7}	6
(Italy) L Garrone (Luxembourg) K Kschwendt	7^{7}	6^{5}	2
(Czechoslovakia) P Langrová (Czechoslovakia) J Pospíšilová	6	5	5
Alt	(Australia) K Godridge (Australia) K Sharpe	4	7	7

Final
(France) A Dechaume (France) N Herreman	6	3	1
Alt	(Australia) K Godridge (Australia) K Sharpe	4	6	6
