= 1991 Open Clarins – Doubles =

Doubles
- 1991 Open Clarins

Final
- Champions: (Czechoslovakia) Petra Langrová (Czechoslovakia) Radka Zrubáková
- Runners-up: (France) Alexia Dechaume (France) Julie Halard
- Score: 6–4, 6–4

Details
- Draw: 16 (1Q)
- Seeds: 4

Events
Singles	Doubles
← 1990 ·	Clarins Open	· 1992 →

Kristin Godridge and Kirrily Sharpe were the defending champions, but Sharpe did not compete this year. Godridge teamed up with Rachel McQuillan and lost in the quarterfinals to Alexia Dechaume and Julie Halard.

Petra Langrová and Radka Zrubáková won the title by defeating Dechaume and Halard 6–4, 6–4 in the final.

== Seeds ==
1. (Italy) Laura Garrone / (Argentina) Mercedes Paz (quarterfinals)
2. (France) Isabelle Demongeot / (Spain) Conchita Martínez (semifinals)
3. (Czechoslovakia) Petra Langrová / (Czechoslovakia) Radka Zrubáková (champions)
4. (Australia) Kristin Godridge / (Australia) Rachel McQuillan (quarterfinals)

== Draw ==
=== Key ===
- Q = Qualifier
- WC = Wild card
- LL = Lucky loser
- Alt = Alternate
- SE = Special exempt
- PR = Protected ranking
- ITF = ITF entry
- JE = Junior exempt
- w/o = Walkover
- r = Retired
- d = Defaulted
- SR = Special ranking

=== Draw ===
First round
1	(Italy) L Garrone (Argentina) M Paz	7	2	6
(Bulgaria) E Pampoulova-Wagner (Czechoslovakia) D Szabová	5	6	3
(Italy) S Cecchini (Argentina) P Tarabini	6	3	6
(Netherlands) I Driehuis (Australia) L Pleming	4	6	3
4	(Australia) K Godridge (Australia) R McQuillan	6	6
(Argentina) I Gorrochategui (Sweden) M Strandlund	1	3
(Argentina) B Fulco (Netherlands) N Jagerman	2	0
(France) A Dechaume (France) J Halard	6	6
(France) S Testud (France) N van Lottum	6	3	2
(Switzerland) C Caverzasio (France) N Herreman	2	6	6
(France) E Derly (France) A Fusai	1	1
3	(Czechoslovakia) P Langrová (Czechoslovakia) R Zrubakóvá	6	6
Q	(Germany) S Hack (France) S Sabas	7	7
(Netherlands) G Coorengel (Netherlands) A van Buuren	5	5
(Czechoslovakia) A Noháčová (Czechoslovakia) R Rajchrtová	3	1
2	(France) I Demongeot (Spain) C Martínez	6	6

Quarterfinals
1	(Italy) L Garrone (Argentina) M Paz	6	3	4
(Italy) S Cecchini (Argentina) P Tarabini	3	6	6
4	(Australia) K Godridge (Australia) R McQuillan	6	3	5
(France) A Dechaume (France) J Halard	4	6	7
(Switzerland) C Caverzasio (France) N Herreman	4	3
3	(Czechoslovakia) P Langrová (Czechoslovakia) R Zrubakóvá	6	6
Q	(Germany) S Hack (France) S Sabas	3	4
2	(France) I Demongeot (Spain) C Martínez	6	6

Semifinals
(Italy) S Cecchini (Argentina) P Tarabini	0	5
(France) A Dechaume (France) J Halard	6	7
3	(Czechoslovakia) P Langrová (Czechoslovakia) R Zrubakóvá	6	3	6
2	(France) I Demongeot (Spain) C Martínez	2	6	2

Final
(France) A Dechaume (France) J Halard	4	4
3	(Czechoslovakia) P Langrová (Czechoslovakia) R Zrubakóvá	6	6
