= 1989 Open Clarins – Singles =

Singles
- 1989 Open Clarins

Final
- Champion: (Italy) Sandra Cecchini
- Runner-up: (Czechoslovakia) Regina Rajchrtová
- Score: 6–4, 6–7^{(5–7)}, 6–1

Details
- Draw: 32 (2WC/4Q/2LL)
- Seeds: 8

Events
Singles	Doubles
← 1988 ·	Clarins Open	· 1990 →

Petra Langrová was the defending champion, but lost in the semifinals to Sandra Cecchini.

Cecchini won the title by defeating Regina Rajchrtová 6–4, 6–7^{(5–7)}, 6–1 in the final.

== Seeds ==
1. (France) Nathalie Tauziat (quarterfinals)
2. (West Germany) Isabel Cueto (quarterfinals)
3. (Czechoslovakia) Radka Zrubáková (quarterfinals)
4. (Italy) Sandra Cecchini (champion)
5. (Argentina) Bettina Fulco (second round)
6. (Czechoslovakia) Regina Rajchrtová (final)
7. (Belgium) Sandra Wasserman (first round)
8. (Argentina) Patricia Tarabini (first round)

== Draw ==
=== Key ===
- Q = Qualifier
- WC = Wild card
- LL = Lucky loser
- Alt = Alternate
- SE = Special exempt
- PR = Protected ranking
- ITF = ITF entry
- JE = Junior exempt
- w/o = Walkover
- r = Retired
- d = Defaulted
- SR = Special ranking

=== Finals ===
Semifinals
6	(Czechoslovakia) Regina Rajchrtová	5	6	6
(Switzerland) Cathy Caverzasio	7	2	2
4	(Italy) Sandra Cecchini	6^{5}	6	6
(Czechoslovakia) Petra Langrová	7^{7}	3	1

Final
6	(Czechoslovakia) Regina Rajchrtová	4	7^{7}	1
4	(Italy) Sandra Cecchini	6	6^{5}	6

=== Top half ===
First round
1	(France) N Tauziat	6	6
(Denmark) T Scheuer-Larsen	1	4
(Italy) F Bonsignori	2	2
(Australia) R McQuillan	6	6
WC	(France) J Halard	2	6	6
(France) C Suire	6	4	1
Q	(Argentina) A Villagrán	0	2
6	(Czechoslovakia) R Rajchrtová	6	6
3	(Czechoslovakia) R Zrubáková	6	7
(Italy) B Romanò	2	5
(Socialist Federal Republic of Yugoslavia) S Goleš	4	4
(Italy) L Lapi	6	6
(Switzerland) C Caverzasio	6^{4}	6	6
LL	(France) N Guerrée	7^{7}	3	4
WC	(France) A Dechaume	6	6
7	(Belgium) S Wasserman	0	1

Second round
1	(France) N Tauziat	w/o
(Australia) R McQuillan
WC	(France) J Halard	7	3	2
6	(Czechoslovakia) R Rajchrtová	5	6	6
3	(Czechoslovakia) R Zrubáková	6	7
(Italy) L Lapi	1	5
(Switzerland) C Caverzasio	6	6
WC	(France) A Dechaume	3	1

Quarterfinals
1	(France) N Tauziat	6	4	2
6	(Czechoslovakia) R Rajchrtová	1	6	6
3	(Czechoslovakia) R Zrubáková	3	3
(Switzerland) C Caverzasio	6	6

Semifinals
6	(Czechoslovakia) R Rajchrtová	5	6	6
(Switzerland) C Caverzasio	7	2	2

=== Bottom half ===
First round
5	(Argentina) B Fulco	3	6	6
Q	(France) F Gauvain	6	3	4
(Bulgaria) E Pampoulova	6	7
Q	(West Germany) H Kadzidroga	4	5
(Czechoslovakia) E Švíglerová	3	4
(France) N Herreman	6	6
(Brazil) A Vieira	2	3
4	(Italy) S Cecchini	6	6
8	(Argentina) P Tarabini	6^{4}	0
(Czechoslovakia) P Langrová	7^{7}	6
LL	(France) P Etchemendy	4	7	6
(Australia) M Jaggard	6	5	1
Q	(West Germany) V Martinek	6	4	6
(Italy) L Garrone	4	6	4
(West Germany) S Hack	6	2	5
2	(West Germany) I Cueto	4	6	7

Second round
5	(Argentina) B Fulco	4	0
(Bulgaria) E Pampoulova	6	6
(France) N Herreman	5	3
4	(Italy) S Cecchini	7	6
(Czechoslovakia) P Langrová	6	7
LL	(France) P Etchemendy	3	5
Q	(West Germany) V Martinek	3	1
2	(West Germany) I Cueto	6	6

Quarterfinals
(Bulgaria) E Pampoulova	6	1	4
4	(Italy) S Cecchini	3	6	6
(Czechoslovakia) P Langrová	6	6
2	(West Germany) I Cueto	4	2

Semifinals
4	(Italy) S Cecchini	6^{5}	6	6
(Czechoslovakia) P Langrová	7^{7}	3	1
