= 1989 Open Clarins – Doubles =

Doubles
- 1989 Open Clarins

Final
- Champions: (Italy) Sandra Cecchini (Argentina) Patricia Tarabini
- Runners-up: (France) Nathalie Herreman (France) Catherine Suire
- Score: 6–1, 6–1

Details
- Draw: 16 (1WC)
- Seeds: 4

Events
Singles	Doubles
← 1988 ·	Clarins Open	· 1990 →

Alexia Dechaume and Emmanuelle Derly were the defending champions, but lost in the first round to Rachel McQuillan and Nathalie Tauziat.

Sandra Cecchini and Patricia Tarabini won the title by defeating Nathalie Herreman and Catherine Suire 6–1, 6–1 in the final.

== Seeds ==
1. (Australia) Rachel McQuillan / (France) Nathalie Tauziat (semifinals)
2. (Italy) Sandra Cecchini / (Argentina) Patricia Tarabini (champions)
3. (France) Nathalie Herreman / (France) Catherine Suire (final)
4. (Socialist Federal Republic of Yugoslavia) Sabrina Goleš / (Denmark) Tine Scheuer-Larsen (first round)

== Draw ==
=== Key ===
- Q = Qualifier
- WC = Wild card
- LL = Lucky loser
- Alt = Alternate
- SE = Special exempt
- PR = Protected ranking
- ITF = ITF entry
- JE = Junior exempt
- w/o = Walkover
- r = Retired
- d = Defaulted
- SR = Special ranking

=== Draw ===
First round
1	(Australia) R McQuillan (France) N Tauziat	5	6	6
(France) A Dechaume (France) E Derly	7	2	4
(Italy) L Garrone (Brazil) A Vieira	6	7^{7}
(France) P Etchemendy (France) N Guerrée	3	6^{5}
3	(France) N Herreman (France) C Suire	6	6
(Italy) F Bonsignori (Czechoslovakia) E Švíglerová	0	0
(United States) Debbie Ladig (France) Valerie Vernet	0	0
(Argentina) B Fulco (Luxembourg) K Schwendt	6	6
(Czechoslovakia) P Langrová (Czechoslovakia) R Zrubáková	4	1
(Czechoslovakia) I Budařová (Czechoslovakia) R Rajchrtová	6	6
(Netherlands) S Schilder (Australia) R Stubbs	2	6	6
4	(Socialist Federal Republic of Yugoslavia) S Goleš (Denmark) T Scheuer-Larsen	6	2	4
(Australia) T Morton (Argentina) A Villagrán	6	4	6
(Czechoslovakia) A Strnadová (France) N van Lottum	1	6	3
WC	(France) J Halard (France) F Gauvain	1	1
2	(Italy) S Cecchini (Argentina) P Tarabini	6	6

Quarterfinals
1	(Australia) R McQuillan (France) N Tauziat	6	6
(Italy) L Garrone (Brazil) A Vieira	3	2
3	(France) N Herreman (France) C Suire	6	7^{7}
(Argentina) B Fulco (Luxembourg) K Schwendt	4	6^{2}
(Czechoslovakia) I Budařová (Czechoslovakia) R Rajchrtová	6	6
(Netherlands) S Schilder (Australia) R Stubbs	3	0
(Australia) T Morton (Argentina) A Villagrán	2	6	4
2	(Italy) S Cecchini (Argentina) P Tarabini	6	4	6

Semifinals
1	(Australia) R McQuillan (France) N Tauziat	7^{10}	3	4
3	(France) N Herreman (France) C Suire	6^{8}	6	6
(Czechoslovakia) I Budařová (Czechoslovakia) R Rajchrtová	3	3
2	(Italy) S Cecchini (Argentina) P Tarabini	6	6

Final
3	(France) N Herreman (France) C Suire	1	1
2	(Italy) S Cecchini (Argentina) P Tarabini	6	6
