= 1990 Open Clarins – Singles =

Singles
- 1990 Open Clarins

Final
- Champion: (Spain) Conchita Martínez
- Runner-up: (Argentina) Patricia Tarabini
- Score: 7–5, 6–3

Details
- Draw: 32 (2WC/4Q/1LL)
- Seeds: 8

Events
Singles	Doubles
← 1989 ·	Clarins Open	· 1991 →

Sandra Cecchini was the defending champion, but lost in the semifinals to Patricia Tarabini.

Conchita Martínez won the title by defeating Tarabini 7–5, 6–3 in the final.

== Seeds ==
1. (Spain) Conchita Martínez (champion)
2. (Italy) Sandra Cecchini (semifinals)
3. (Germany) Isabel Cueto (first round)
4. (France) Julie Halard (semifinals)
5. (Australia) Rachel McQuillan (quarterfinals)
6. (Switzerland) Cathy Caverzasio (first round, retired)
7. (Czechoslovakia) Regina Rajchrtová (quarterfinals)
8. (Italy) ~~Laura Golarsa~~ (withdrew)

== Draw ==
=== Key ===
- Q = Qualifier
- WC = Wild card
- LL = Lucky loser
- Alt = Alternate
- ITF = ITF entry
- PR = Protected ranking
- SR = Special ranking
- SE = Special exempt
- JE = Junior exempt
- JR = Junior Accelerator Programme entrant
- CO = College Accelerator Programme entrant
- NG = Next Gen Accelerator Program entrant
- w/o = Walkover
- r = Retired
- d = Defaulted

=== Finals ===
Semifinals
1	(Spain) Conchita Martínez	6	6
4	(France) Julie Halard	1	2
(Argentina) Patricia Tarabini	6	7
2	(Italy) Sandra Cecchini	4	5

Final
1	(Spain) Conchita Martínez	7	6
(Argentina) Patricia Tarabini	5	3

=== Top half ===
First round
1	(Spain) C Martínez	6	6
(France) K Quentrec	1	3
LL	(France) S Niox-Château	6	3	1
(France) N Herreman	2	6	6
(Bulgaria) E Pampoulova	7^{7}	6
Q	(Poland) K Nowak	6^{4}	4
(Italy) F Bonsignori	1	6	3
5	(Australia) R McQuillan	6	3	6
4	(France) J Halard	6	6
(Italy) L Lapi	4	2
(Greece) A Kanellopoulou	7	6
Q	(France) O Graveraux	5	1
Q	(France) A Fusai	6^{6}	2
(Germany) S Hack	7^{8}	6
Q	(United States) D Graham	6	4	6
LL	(France) E Derly	4	6	3

Second round
1	(Spain) C Martínez	6	6
(France) N Herreman	1	3
(Bulgaria) E Pampoulova	2	4
5	(Australia) R McQuillan	6	6
4	(France) J Halard	4	6	6
(Greece) A Kanellopoulou	6	3	3
(Germany) S Hack	3	6	4
Q	(United States) D Graham	6	3	6

Quarterfinals
1	(Spain) C Martínez	6	6
5	(Australia) R McQuillan	4	3
4	(France) J Halard	6^{2}	6	6
Q	(United States) D Graham	7^{7}	2	3

Semifinals
1	(Spain) C Martínez	6	6
4	(France) J Halard	1	2

=== Bottom half ===
First round
6	(Switzerland) C Caverzasio	4	3^{r}
(Italy) F Romano	6	2
(Switzerland) E Zardo	4	0
(Argentina) P Tarabini	6	6
(Czechoslovakia) P Langrová	5	6	7
WC	(France) S Testud	7	4	5
(Italy) L Garrone	4	6	6
3	(West Germany) I Cueto	6	2	3
7	(Czechoslovakia) R Rajchrtová	6	6
(Sweden) C Dahlman	2	1
LL	(Brazil) L Corsato	2	6	7
LL	(West Germany) H Kadzidroga	6	1	5
WC	(France) A Dechaume	7	6
(Czechoslovakia) J Pospíšilová	5	3
(Belgium) S Wasserman	7	4	5
2	(Italy) S Cecchini	5	6	7

Second round
(Italy) F Romano	4	4
(Argentina) P Tarabini	6	6
(Czechoslovakia) P Langrová	6	4	6
(Italy) L Garrone	4	6	1
7	(Czechoslovakia) R Rajchrtová	6	6
LL	(Brazil) L Corsato	2	0
WC	(France) A Dechaume	4	5
2	(Italy) S Cecchini	6	7

Quarterfinals
(Argentina) P Tarabini	6	6
(Czechoslovakia) P Langrová	4	3
7	(Czechoslovakia) R Rajchrtová	6	1	4
2	(Italy) S Cecchini	3	6	6

Semifinals
(Argentina) P Tarabini	6	7
2	(Italy) S Cecchini	4	5
