= 1988 US Open – Women's singles qualifying =

Women's singles qualifying
- 1988 US Open

Events
| Singles | men | women | | boys | girls |
| Doubles | men | women | mixed | boys | girls |
| WC Singles | men | women | quad |
| WC Doubles | men | women | quad |
| Legends | men | women | mixed |

Qualification
| Singles | men | women |
- US Open

Players who neither had high enough rankings nor received wild cards to enter the main draw of the annual US Open Tennis Championships participated in a qualifying tournament held over several days before the event.

== Seeds ==
1. (France) Catherine Suire (qualified)
2. (Switzerland) Céline Cohen (first round)
3. (Australia) Elizabeth Smylie (first round)
4. (France) Nathalie Guerrée-Spitzer (first round)
5. (United States) Lea Antonoplis (second round)
6. (Australia) Jenny Byrne (qualifying competition, lucky loser)
7. (New Zealand) Julie Richardson (qualified)
8. (France) Emmanuelle Derly (qualifying competition)
9. (United States) Anna Ivan (qualifying competition)
10. (United States) Susan Mascarin (qualifying competition)
11. (Czechoslovakia) Jana Pospíšilová (second round)
12. (United States) Donna Faber (first round)
13. (South Africa) Amanda Coetzer (first round)
14. (United States) Niurka Sodupe (first round)
15. (Sweden) Maria Strandlund (first round)
16. (United States) Pam Casale (qualifying competition)

== Qualifiers ==
1. (France) Catherine Suire
2. (United States) Lisa Green
3. (Japan) Kumiko Okamoto
4. (United States) Kim Steinmetz
5. (New Zealand) Julie Richardson
6. (Australia) Jo-Anne Faull
7. (Denmark) Tine Scheuer-Larsen
8. (United Kingdom) Clare Wood

== Lucky losers ==
1. (Australia) Jenny Byrne

== Qualifying draw ==
Key

- Q = Qualifier
- WC = Wild card
- LL = Lucky loser
- Alt = Alternate
- ITF = ITF entry
- PR = Protected ranking
- SR = Special ranking
- SE = Special exempt
- JE = Junior exempt
- JR = Junior Accelerator Programme entrant
- CO = College Accelerator Programme entrant
- NG = Next Gen Accelerator Program entrant
- w/o = Walkover
- r = Retired
- d = Defaulted

=== First qualifier ===
First round
1 | (France) Catherine Suire | 7^{7} | 7^{7}
(Peru) Pilar Vásquez | 6^{1} | 6^{5}
(United States) Tina Mochizuki | 6 | 5 | 3
(United States) Lindsay Bartlett | 2 | 7 | 6
(United States) Deeann Hansel | 4 | 1
WC | (United States) Shannan McCarthy | 6 | 6
(Italy) Cathy Caverzasio | 4 | 6 | 4
10 | (United States) Susan Mascarin | 6 | 1 | 6

Second round
1 | (France) Catherine Suire | 6 | 6
(United States) Lindsay Bartlett | 3 | 4
WC | (United States) Shannan McCarthy | 6 | 6^{5} | 1
10 | (United States) Susan Mascarin | 3 | 7^{7} | 6

Qualifying competition
1 | (France) Catherine Suire | 6 | 6
10 | (United States) Susan Mascarin | 3 | 3

=== Second qualifier ===
First round
11 | (Czechoslovakia) Jana Pospíšilová | 6^{3} | 6 | 6
(Netherlands) Marcella Mesker | 7^{7} | 1 | 3
WC | (United States) Lisa Green | 6 | 1 | 7
(Japan) Akemi Nishiya | 4 | 6 | 5
(Japan) Yukie Koizumi | 5 | 4
WC | (United States) Eleni Rossides | 7 | 6
(Canada) Patricia Hy-Boulais | 5 | 1
6 | (Australia) Jenny Byrne | 7 | 6

Second round
11 | (Czechoslovakia) Jana Pospíšilová | 2 | 5
WC | (United States) Lisa Green | 6 | 7
WC | (United States) Eleni Rossides | 3 | 4
6 | (Australia) Jenny Byrne | 6 | 6

Qualifying competition
WC | (United States) Lisa Green | 7 | 7^{7}
6 | (Australia) Jenny Byrne | 5 | 6^{5}

=== Third qualifier ===
First round
3 | (Australia) Elizabeth Smylie | 4 | 4
(Australia) Rachel McQuillan | 6 | 6
(Argentina) Gabriela Mosca | 2 | 0
(Japan) Emiko Okagawa | 6 | 6
(United States) Anna-Maria Fernandez | 3 | 4
(Japan) Kumiko Okamoto | 6 | 6
(France) Sybille Niox-Château | 4 | 6 | 6
15 | (Sweden) Maria Strandlund | 6 | 4 | 3

Second round
(Australia) Rachel McQuillan | 6 | 7^{7}
(Japan) Emiko Okagawa | 0 | 6^{5}
(Japan) Kumiko Okamoto | 7^{7} | 6
(France) Sybille Niox-Château | 6^{2} | 2

Qualifying competition
(Australia) Rachel McQuillan | 5 | 0
(Japan) Kumiko Okamoto | 7 | 6

=== Fourth qualifier ===
First round
14 | (United States) Niurka Sodupe | 6^{5} | 2
(United States) Leigh-Anne Eldredge | 7^{7} | 6
(United States) Louise Allen | 3 | 3
(United States) Kim Steinmetz | 6 | 6
(United States) Vicki Nelson-Dunbar | 4 | 6 | 2
(Brazil) Andrea Vieira | 6 | 2 | 6
(Netherlands) Carin Bakkum | 1 | 0
8 | (France) Emmanuelle Derly | 6 | 6

Second round
(United States) Leigh-Anne Eldredge | 2 | 2
(United States) Kim Steinmetz | 6 | 6
(Brazil) Andrea Vieira | 1 | 3
8 | (France) Emmanuelle Derly | 6 | 6

Qualifying competition
(United States) Kim Steinmetz | 6 | 2 | 6
8 | (France) Emmanuelle Derly | 2 | 6 | 0

=== Fifth qualifier ===
First round
7 | (New Zealand) Julie Richardson | 6 | 6
(France) Catherine Bonnet | 3 | 0
WC | (United States) Teri Whitlinger | 0 | 4
(United States) Cammy MacGregor | 6 | 6
WC | (United States) Jessica Emmons | 6 | 6
WC | (United States) Andrea Farley | 4 | 4
(United Kingdom) Sarah Loosemore | 1 | 3
9 | (United States) Anna Ivan | 6 | 6

Second round
7 | (New Zealand) Julie Richardson | 3 | 6 | 6
(United States) Cammy MacGregor | 6 | 1 | 3
WC | (United States) Jessica Emmons | 2 | 3
9 | (United States) Anna Ivan | 6 | 6

Qualifying competition
7 | (New Zealand) Julie Richardson | 6 | 6^{4} | 6
9 | (United States) Anna Ivan | 2 | 7^{7} | 4

=== Sixth qualifier ===
First round
12 | (United States) Donna Faber | 3 | 1
(Australia) Jo-Anne Faull | 6 | 6
WC | (United States) Iwalani McCalla | 7^{7} | 6
(Spain) Inmaculada Varas | 6^{2} | 4
(South Africa) Lise Gregory | 2 | 6 | 6^{5}
(Brazil) Luciana Corsato-Owsianka | 6 | 3 | 7^{7}
(United States) Sandy Collins | 6 | 4 | 6
4 | (France) Nathalie Guerrée-Spitzer | 1 | 6 | 3

Second round
(Australia) Jo-Anne Faull | 6 | 6
WC | (United States) Iwalani McCalla | 1 | 2
(Brazil) Luciana Corsato-Owsianka | 6 | 6
(United States) Sandy Collins | 3 | 1

Qualifying competition
(Australia) Jo-Anne Faull | 6 | 6
(Brazil) Luciana Corsato-Owsianka | 4 | 3

=== Seventh qualifier ===
First round
5 | (United States) Lea Antonoplis | 7 | 6
(Australia) Louise Field | 5 | 4
(United States) Penny Barg | 4 | 5
(Denmark) Tine Scheuer-Larsen | 6 | 7
WC | (United States) Sandra Birch | 6 | 6
(United States) Melissa Brown | 4 | 2
(France) Marie-Christine Calleja | 6 | 6
13 | (South Africa) Amanda Coetzer | 4 | 3

Second round
5 | (United States) Lea Antonoplis | 0 | 3
(Denmark) Tine Scheuer-Larsen | 6 | 6
WC | (United States) Sandra Birch | 5 | 0
(France) Marie-Christine Calleja | 7 | 6

Qualifying competition
(Denmark) Tine Scheuer-Larsen | 6 | 6
(France) Marie-Christine Calleja | 2 | 2

=== Eighth qualifier ===
First round
16 | (United States) Pam Casale | 6 | 6^{4} | 6
(Australia) Alison Scott | 4 | 7^{7} | 1
(United States) Jeri Ingram | 6 | 6
(United States) Cynthia MacGregor | 4 | 1
(United Kingdom) Julie Salmon | 5 | 6^{0}
(United States) Amy Schwartz | 7 | 7^{7}
(United Kingdom) Clare Wood | 7^{7} | 4 | 6
2 | (Switzerland) Céline Cohen | 6^{5} | 6 | 0

Second round
16 | (United States) Pam Casale | 6 | 6
(United States) Jeri Ingram | 2 | 3
(United States) Amy Schwartz | 2 | 1
(United Kingdom) Clare Wood | 6 | 6

Qualifying competition
16 | (United States) Pam Casale | 2 | 1
(United Kingdom) Clare Wood | 6 | 6
