= 1990 Open Clarins =

- Date: 17–23 September
- Edition: 4th
- Category: Tier IV
- Draw: 32S / 16D
- Prize money: $150,000
- Surface: Clay / outdoor
- Location: Paris, France
- Venue: Racing Club de France

Champions

Singles
- (Spain) Conchita Martínez

Doubles
- (Australia) Kristin Godridge / (Australia) Kirrily Sharpe
| ← 1989 · | Open Clarins | · 1991 → |

The 1990 Open Clarins was a women's tennis tournament played on outdoor clay courts at the Racing Club de France in Paris, France, and was part of the Tier IV category of the 1990 WTA Tour. It was the fourth edition of the tournament and was held from 17 September until 23 September 1990. First-seeded Conchita Martínez won the singles title and earned $27,000 first-prize money.

== Finals ==
=== Singles ===
(Spain) Conchita Martínez defeated (Argentina) Patricia Tarabini 7–5, 6–3

- It was Martínez's 1st singles title of the year and the 5th of her career.

=== Doubles ===
(Australia) Kristin Godridge / (Australia) Kirrily Sharpe defeated (France) Alexia Dechaume / (France) Nathalie Herreman 4–6, 6–3, 6–1
