= 1988 Open Clarins =

- Date: 19–25 September
- Edition: 2nd
- Category: 1
- Draw: 32S / 16D
- Prize money: $50,000
- Surface: Clay / outdoor
- Location: Paris, France

Champions

Singles
- (Czechoslovakia) Petra Langrová

Doubles
- (France) Alexia Dechaume (France) Emmanuelle Derly
| ← 1987 · | Open Clarins | · 1989 → |

The 1988 Open Clarins was a women's tennis tournament played on outdoor clay courts in Paris, France, and was part of the Category 1 tier of the 1988 WTA Tour. It was the second edition of the tournament and was held from 19 September until 25 September 1988. Qualifier Petra Langrová won the singles title.

== Finals ==
=== Singles ===
(Czechoslovakia) Petra Langrová defeated (Belgium) Sandra Wasserman 7–6^{(7–0)}, 6–2

- It was Langrová's only title of the year and the 1st of her career.

=== Doubles ===
(France) Alexia Dechaume / (France) Emmanuelle Derly defeated (Australia) Louise Field / (France) Nathalie Herreman 6–0, 6–2

- It was Dechaume's only title of the year and the 1st of her career. It was Derly's only title of the year and the 1st of her career.
