= 1988 Southern Cross Classic – Singles =

Singles
- 1988 Southern Cross Classic

Final
- Champion: (Czechoslovakia) Jana Novotná
- Runner-up: (Czechoslovakia) Jana Pospíšilová
- Score: 7–5, 6–4

Events
Singles	Doubles
Southern Cross Classic

Jana Novotná won in the final 7–5, 6–4 against Jana Pospíšilová.

== Seeds ==
A champion seed is indicated in bold text while text in italics indicates the round in which that seed was eliminated.

1. (United States) Lori McNeil (second round)
2. (Australia) Nicole Provis (second round)
3. (Czechoslovakia) Radka Zrubáková (semifinals)
4. (Sweden) Catarina Lindqvist (quarterfinals)
5. (Czechoslovakia) **Jana Novotná (champion)**
6. (Australia) Dianne Balestrat (quarterfinals)
7. (United States) Beverly Bowes (first round)
8. (Italy) Laura Garrone (first round)

== Draw ==
=== Key ===
- Q = Qualifier
- WC = Wild card
- LL = Lucky loser
- Alt = Alternate
- SE = Special exempt
- PR = Protected ranking
- ITF = ITF entry
- JE = Junior exempt
- w/o = Walkover
- r = Retired
- d = Defaulted
- SR = Special ranking

First round
1	(United States) **L McNeil**	1	**7**	**6**
(United States) T Mochizuki	**6**	6	3
(Czechoslovakia) **J Pospíšilová**	**6**	**7**
(New Zealand) C Toleafoa	2	6
(Greece) **O Tsarbopoulou**	**6**	**6**
(Italy) L Lapi	3	2
(Finland) N Dahlman	1	3
6	(Australia) **D Balestrat**	**6**	**6**
4	(Sweden) **C Lindqvist**	**6**	4	**6**
(Australia) J-A Faull	2	**6**	1
(Australia) M Bowrey	6	**6**	3
(New Zealand) **B Cordwell**	**7**	1	**6**
(Belgium) C van Renterghem	**7**	3	4
(Australia) **E Smylie**	5	**6**	**6**
(Sweden) **M Strandlund**	**6**	**6**
7	(United States) B Bowes	2	3
8	(Italy) L Garrone	6	4
(Australia) **R McQuillan**	**7**	**6**
(Australia) L Field	6	4
(Argentina) **C Tessi**	**7**	**6**
(Sweden) M Lindström	1	4
(Sweden) **J Jonerup**	**6**	**6**
(Australia) M Jaggard	2	4
3	(Czechoslovakia) **R Zrubáková**	**6**	**6**
5	(Czechoslovakia) **J Novotná**	1	**6**	**6**
(Belgium) S Appelmans	**6**	1	1
(New Zealand) **J Richardson**	**6**	**6**
(Australia) K McDonald	2	2
(United States) P Jung	3	4
(Denmark) **T Scheuer-Larsen**	**6**	**6**
(Australia) A Scott	4	5
2	(Australia) **N Provis**	**6**	**7**

Second round
1	(United States) L McNeil	4	5
(Czechoslovakia) **J Pospíšilová**	**6**	**7**
(Greece) O Tsarbopoulou	**7**	1	2
6	(Australia) **D Balestrat**	6	**6**	**6**
4	(Sweden) **C Lindqvist**	**7**	6	**6**
(New Zealand) B Cordwell	6	**7**	2
(Australia) E Smylie	2	2
(Sweden) **M Strandlund**	**6**	**6**
(Australia) **R McQuillan**	5	**7**	**6**
(Argentina) C Tessi	**7**	5	3
(Sweden) J Jonerup	6	**6**	4
3	(Czechoslovakia) **R Zrubáková**	**7**	4	**6**
5	(Czechoslovakia) **J Novotná**	**6**	**6**
(New Zealand) J Richardson	2	2
(Denmark) **T Scheuer-Larsen**	5	**6**	**6**
2	(Australia) N Provis	**7**	3	3

Quarterfinals
(Czechoslovakia) **J Pospíšilová**	**6**	2	**6**
6	(Australia) D Balestrat	3	**6**	2
4	(Sweden) C Lindqvist	**6**	4	2
(Sweden) **M Strandlund**	4	**6**	**6**
(Australia) R McQuillan	3	2
3	(Czechoslovakia) **R Zrubáková**	**6**	**6**
5	(Czechoslovakia) **J Novotná**	1	**6**	**6**
(Denmark) T Scheuer-Larsen	**6**	0	3

Semifinals
(Czechoslovakia) **J Pospíšilová**	**6**	1	**7**
(Sweden) M Strandlund	1	**6**	5
3	(Czechoslovakia) R Zrubáková	4	2
5	(Czechoslovakia) **J Novotná**	**6**	**6**

Final
(Czechoslovakia) Jana Pospíšilová	5	4
5	(Czechoslovakia) **Jana Novotná**	**7**	**6**
