= 1988 Southern Cross Classic – Doubles =

Doubles
- 1988 Southern Cross Classic

Final
- Champions: (West Germany) Sylvia Hanika (West Germany) Claudia Kohde-Kilsch
- Runners-up: (United States) Lori McNeil (Czechoslovakia) Jana Novotná
- Score: 7–5, 6–7, 6–4

Events
Singles	Doubles
Southern Cross Classic

Sylvia Hanika and Claudia Kohde-Kilsch won in the final 7–5, 6–7, 6–4 against Lori McNeil and Jana Novotná.

== Seeds ==
Champion seeds are indicated in bold text while text in italics indicates the round in which those seeds were eliminated.

1. (United States) Lori McNeil / (Czechoslovakia) Jana Novotná (final)
2. (Australia) Nicole Provis / (Australia) Elizabeth Smylie (quarterfinals)
3. (Sweden) Catarina Lindqvist / (Sweden) Maria Lindström (semifinals)
4. (Denmark) Tine Scheuer-Larsen / (Sweden) Maria Strandlund (quarterfinals)

== Draw ==
=== Key ===
- Q = Qualifier
- WC = Wild card
- LL = Lucky loser
- Alt = Alternate
- SE = Special exempt
- PR = Protected ranking
- ITF = ITF entry
- JE = Junior exempt
- w/o = Walkover
- r = Retired
- d = Defaulted
- SR = Special ranking

First round
1	(United States) **L McNeil** (Czechoslovakia) **J Novotná**	**7**	**6**
(Italy) L Garrone (Austria) H Sprung	5	4
(Australia) K Radford (Australia) A Scott	2	6
(Australia) **J-A Faull** (Australia) **R McQuillan**	**6**	**7**
3	(Sweden) **C Lindqvist** (Sweden) **M Lindström**	**6**	**6**
(Australia) L O'Neill (Greece) O Tsarbopoulou	2	0
(Australia) **K McDonald** (Australia) **R Stubbs**	**6**	**6**
(Australia) D Balestrat (United States) B Bowes	3	1
(Australia) L Field (Australia) M Jaggard	3	**7**	6
(West Germany) **S Hanika** (West Germany) **C Kohde-Kilsch**	**6**	5	**7**
(Belgium) A Devries (Argentina) C Tessi	1	4
4	(Denmark) **T Scheuer-Larsen** (Sweden) **M Strandlund**	**6**	**6**
(New Zealand) **B Cordwell** (New Zealand) **J Richardson**	**7**	**7**
(Czechoslovakia) J Pospíšilová (Czechoslovakia) R Zrubáková	6	6
(Belgium) S Appelmans (Belgium) C van Renterghem	3	**7**	2
2	(Australia) **N Provis** (Australia) **E Smylie**	**6**	5	**6**

Quarterfinals
1	(United States) **L McNeil** (Czechoslovakia) **J Novotná**	**7**	**6**
(Australia) J-A Faull (Australia) R McQuillan	5	1
3	(Sweden) **C Lindqvist** (Sweden) **M Lindström**	**6**	4	**6**
(Australia) K McDonald (Australia) R Stubbs	1	**6**	1
(West Germany) **S Hanika** (West Germany) **C Kohde-Kilsch**	3	**6**	**6**
4	(Denmark) T Scheuer-Larsen (Sweden) M Strandlund	**6**	2	2
(New Zealand) **B Cordwell** (New Zealand) **J Richardson**	**6**	**7**
2	(Australia) N Provis (Australia) E Smylie	1	6

Semifinals
1	(United States) **L McNeil** (Czechoslovakia) **J Novotná**	**6**	**6**
3	(Sweden) C Lindqvist (Sweden) M Lindström	2	3
(West Germany) **S Hanika** (West Germany) **C Kohde-Kilsch**	**6**	**6**
(New Zealand) B Cordwell (New Zealand) J Richardson	4	4

Final
1	(United States) Lori McNeil (Czechoslovakia) Jana Novotná	5	**7**	4
(West Germany) **Sylvia Hanika** (West Germany) **Claudia Kohde-Kilsch**	**7**	6	**6**
