= 1992 Open Clarins – Singles =

Singles
- 1992 Open Clarins

Final
- Champion: (Italy) Sandra Cecchini
- Runner-up: (Switzerland) Emanuela Zardo
- Score: 6–2, 6–1

Details
- Draw: 32 (2WC/4Q)
- Seeds: 8

Events
Singles	Doubles
← 1991 ·	Clarins Open

Conchita Martínez was the defending champion, but did not compete this year.

Sandra Cecchini won the title by defeating Emanuela Zardo 6–2, 6–1 in the final.

== Seeds ==
1. (France) Julie Halard (semifinals)
2. (Germany) Sabine Hack (quarterfinals)
3. (Australia) Rachel McQuillan (first round)
4. (Switzerland) Emanuela Zardo (final)
5. (Austria) Barbara Paulus (second round)
6. (Italy) Sandra Cecchini (champion)
7. (Germany) Veronika Martinek (quarterfinals)
8. (Argentina) Mercedes Paz (second round)

== Draw ==
=== Key ===
- Q = Qualifier
- WC = Wild card
- LL = Lucky loser
- Alt = Alternate
- SE = Special exempt
- PR = Protected ranking
- ITF = ITF entry
- JE = Junior exempt
- w/o = Walkover
- r = Retired
- d = Defaulted
- SR = Special ranking

=== Finals ===
Semifinals
1	(France) Julie Halard	6	6^{12}	4
4	(Switzerland) Emanuela Zardo	3	7^{14}	6
(Socialist Federal Republic of Yugoslavia) Nadin Ercegović	1	6^{5}
6	(Italy) Sandra Cecchini	6	7^{7}

Final
4	(Switzerland) Emanuela Zardo	2	1
6	(Italy) Sandra Cecchini	6	6

=== Top half ===
First round
1	(France) J Halard	6	6
(Argentina) B Fulco	0	2
(Germany) M Babel	4	1^{r}
(Germany) S Frankl	6	1
(Italy) F Bonsignori	6	6
(Hungary) A Földényi	1	3
(France) N van Lottum	2	3
8	(Argentina) M Paz	6	6
4	(Switzerland) E Zardo	6	6
(France) S Testud	3	2
(Spain) V Ruano Pascual	6	7
Q	(Belgium) C Wuillot	2	5
(Germany) S Meier	6	6
(Czechoslovakia) E Švíglerová	4	0
Q	(United States) P O'Reilly	4	2
5	(Austria) B Paulus	6	6

Second round
1	(France) J Halard	6	6
(Germany) S Frankl	1	4
(Italy) F Bonsignori	3	6	6
8	(Argentina) M Paz	6	4	0
4	(Switzerland) E Zardo	6	6
(Spain) V Ruano Pascual	2	2
(Germany) S Meier	6	6
5	(Austria) B Paulus	3	2

Quarterfinals
1	(France) J Halard	6	1	6
(Italy) F Bonsignori	3	6	0
4	(Switzerland) E Zardo	6	6
(Germany) S Meier	0	1

Semifinals
1	(France) J Halard	6	6^{12}	4
4	(Switzerland) E Zardo	3	7^{14}	6

=== Bottom half ===
First round
7	(Germany) V Martinek	6	6
Q	(Spain) E Bottini	1	4
WC	(France) S Sabas	2	1
(Argentina) P Tarabini	6	6
Q	(Spain) E Bes	1	4
(Socialist Federal Republic of Yugoslavia) N Ercegović	6	6
(France) C Mothes	6^{5}	6	7^{7}
3	(Australia) R McQuillan	7^{7}	3	6^{5}
6	(Italy) S Cecchini	6	6
(Belgium) D Monami	4	4
(South Africa) J Kruger	6	2	7^{7}
(Czechoslovakia) P Langrová	3	6	6^{3}
WC	(France) A Fusai	6	6
(Netherlands) N Muns-Jagerman	4	2
(Australia) K Godridge	2	3
2	(Germany) S Hack	6	6

Second round
7	(Germany) V Martinek	6	6
(Argentina) P Tarabini	2	4
(Socialist Federal Republic of Yugoslavia) N Ercegović	6	7^{8}
(France) C Mothes	4	6^{6}
6	(Italy) S Cecchini	6	6
(South Africa) J Kruger	2	4
WC	(France) A Fusai	1	5
2	(Germany) S Hack	6	7

Quarterfinals
7	(Germany) V Martinek	6	1	3
(Socialist Federal Republic of Yugoslavia) N Ercegović	3	6	6
6	(Italy) S Cecchini	6	6
2	(Germany) S Hack	3	2

Semifinals
(Socialist Federal Republic of Yugoslavia) N Ercegović	1	6^{5}
6	(Italy) S Cecchini	6	7^{7}
