= 1992 Open Clarins – Doubles =

Doubles
- 1992 Open Clarins

Final
- Champion: (Italy) Sandra Cecchini (Argentina) Patricia Tarabini
- Runner-up: (Australia) Rachel McQuillan (Netherlands) Noëlle van Lottum
- Score: 7–5, 6–1

Details
- Draw: 16 (1WC/1Q)
- Seeds: 4

Events
Singles	Doubles
← 1991 ·	Clarins Open

Petra Langrová and Helena Suková were the defending champions, but Suková did not compete this year. Langrová teamed up with Sandrine Testud and lost in the semifinals to Rachel McQuillan and Noëlle van Lottum.

Sandra Cecchini and Patricia Tarabini won the title by defeating McQuillan and van Lottum 7–5, 6–1 in the final.

== Seeds ==
1. (France) Julie Halard / (Argentina) Mercedes Paz (semifinals)
2. (Australia) Rachel McQuillan / (France) Noëlle van Lottum (final)
3. (Italy) Sandra Cecchini / (Argentina) Patricia Tarabini (champions)
4. (Czechoslovakia) Petra Langrová / (France) Sandrine Testud (semifinals)

== Draw ==
=== Key ===
- Q = Qualifier
- WC = Wild card
- LL = Lucky loser
- Alt = Alternate
- SE = Special exempt
- PR = Protected ranking
- ITF = ITF entry
- JE = Junior exempt
- w/o = Walkover
- r = Retired
- d = Defaulted
- SR = Special ranking

=== Draw ===
First round
1	(France) J Halard (Argentina) M Paz	6	6
WC	(France) Alexandra Boutellier (France) Virginie Massart	1	0
(Argentina) MJ Gaidano (Bulgaria) E Pampoulova	7	4	0
(Argentina) B Fulco Villella (Spain) V Ruano Pascual	5	6	6
3	(Italy) S Cecchini (Argentina) P Tarabini	6	6
(Spain) E Bes (Austria) H Sprung	0	0
(Australia) K Godridge (Netherlands) N Muns-Jagerman	6	7^{7}
(Czechoslovakia) E Švíglerová (Belgium) S Wasserman	2	6^{4}
(Brazil) L Corsato-Owsianka (Namibia) E Nortje	3	4
(France) A Fusai (France) N Herreman	6	6
(Germany) S Frankl (Germany) S Meier	4	6	4
4	(Czechoslovakia) P Langrová (France) S Testud	6	2	6
(Germany) S Hack (United States) P O'Reilly	7^{7}	3	6
Q	(South Africa) J Kruger (Belgium) D Monami	6^{5}	6	2
(Greece) J Apostoli (France) S Sabas	6	0	1
2	(Australia) R McQuillan (France) N van Lottum	4	6	6

Quarterfinals
1	(France) J Halard (Argentina) M Paz	6	6
(Argentina) B Fulco Villella (Spain) V Ruano Pascual	0	1
3	(Italy) S Cecchini (Argentina) P Tarabini	4	6	7
(Australia) K Godridge (Netherlands) N Muns-Jagerman	6	4	5
(France) A Fusai (France) N Herreman	4	6	2
4	(Czechoslovakia) P Langrová (France) S Testud	6	4	6
(Germany) S Hack (United States) P O'Reilly	4	0
2	(Australia) R McQuillan (France) N van Lottum	6	6

Semifinals
1	(France) J Halard (Argentina) M Paz	4	2
3	(Italy) S Cecchini (Argentina) P Tarabini	6	6
4	(Czechoslovakia) P Langrová (France) S Testud	6^{5}	4
2	(Australia) R McQuillan (France) N van Lottum	7^{7}	6

Final
3	(Italy) S Cecchini (Argentina) P Tarabini	7	6
2	(Australia) R McQuillan (France) N van Lottum	5	1
