= 1988 Southern Cross Classic =

- Date: 28 November – 4 December
- Edition: Only
- Category: Tier V
- Location: Adelaide, Australia

Champions

Singles
- (Czechoslovakia) Jana Novotná

Doubles
- (West Germany) Sylvia Hanika / (West Germany) Claudia Kohde-Kilsch
- Southern Cross Classic

The 1988 Southern Cross Classic was a women's tennis tournament played on outdoor hard courts in Adelaide in Australia and was part of Tier V of the 1989 WTA Tour. The tournament ran from 28 November through 4 December 1988. The winner of the Singles category was Jana Novotná from The Czech Republic and the winners of the Doubles category were Sylvia Hanika and Claudia Kohde-Kilsch from Germany.

== Finals ==
=== Singles ===
(Czechoslovakia) Jana Novotná defeated (Czechoslovakia) Jana Pospíšilová 7–5, 6–4

- It was Novotná's 7th title of the year and the 11th of her career.

=== Doubles ===
(West Germany) Sylvia Hanika / (West Germany) Claudia Kohde-Kilsch defeated (United States) Lori McNeil / (Czechoslovakia) Jana Novotná 7–5, 6–7, 6–4

- It was Hanika's only title of the year and the 4th of her career. It was Kohde-Kilsch's 2nd title of the year and the 30th of her career.
