= 1991 Open Clarins – Singles =

Singles
- 1991 Open Clarins

Final
- Champion: (Spain) Conchita Martínez
- Runner-up: (Argentina) Inés Gorrochategui
- Score: 6–0, 6–3

Details
- Draw: 32 (4Q/3LL)
- Seeds: 8

Events
Singles	Doubles
← 1990 ·	Clarins Open	· 1992 →

Conchita Martínez successfully defended her title by defeating Inés Gorrochategui 6–0, 6–3 in the final.

== Seeds ==
1. (Spain) Conchita Martínez (champion)
2. (Italy) Sandra Cecchini (first round)
3. (Czechoslovakia) Radka Zrubáková (second round)
4. (France) Julie Halard (semifinals)
5. (Australia) Rachel McQuillan (first round)
6. (Switzerland) Emanuela Zardo (quarterfinals)
7. (Czechoslovakia) Regina Rajchrtová (first round)
8. (Italy) Federica Bonsignori (second round)

== Draw ==
=== Key ===
- Q = Qualifier
- WC = Wild card
- LL = Lucky loser
- Alt = Alternate
- SE = Special exempt
- PR = Protected ranking
- ITF = ITF entry
- JE = Junior exempt
- w/o = Walkover
- r = Retired
- d = Defaulted
- SR = Special ranking

=== Finals ===
Semifinals
1	(Spain) Conchita Martínez	6	2	7
4	(France) Julie Halard	4	6	5
(Argentina) Mercedes Paz	2	3
(Argentina) Inés Gorrochategui	6	6

Final
1	(Spain) Conchita Martínez	6	6
(Argentina) Inés Gorrochategui	0	3

=== Top half ===
First round
1	(Spain) C Martínez	6	6
(Argentina) P Tarabini	1	3
(Germany) S Hack	6	6
(Argentina) M Pérez Roldán	0	1
Q	(Germany) S Frankl	6	6
Q	(France) V Paquet	2	0
(Sweden) M Strandlund	2	4
6	(Switzerland) E Zardo	6	6
4	(France) J Halard	6	0	6
(France) A Dechaume	4	6	2
LL	(France) N Housset	1	6^{4}
(Italy) L Garrone	6	7^{7}
(Luxembourg) K Kschwendt	6	3	4
(Germany) V Martinek	0	6	6
Q	(Czechoslovakia) D Szabová	3	7^{7}	0
8	(Italy) F Bonsignori	6	6^{1}	6

Second round
1	(Spain) C Martínez	6	6
(Germany) S Hack	0	3
Q	(Germany) S Frankl	3	2
6	(Switzerland) E Zardo	6	6
4	(France) J Halard	7^{8}	6
(Italy) L Garrone	6^{6}	2
(Germany) V Martinek	7^{7}	6
8	(Italy) F Bonsignori	6^{4}	3

Quarterfinals
1	(Spain) C Martínez	6	6
6	(Switzerland) E Zardo	4	2
4	(France) J Halard	6	6
(Germany) V Martinek	4	3

Semifinals
1	(Spain) C Martínez	6	2	7
4	(France) J Halard	4	6	5

=== Bottom half ===
First round
7	(Czechoslovakia) R Rajchrtová	4	6	1
(France) S Testud	6	4	6
(Netherlands) N Jagerman	1	6	6
(Argentina) B Fulco	6	3	2
(Argentina) M Paz	6	6
(Czechoslovakia) P Langrová	2	4
(Switzerland) C Caverzasio	5	2
3	(Czechoslovakia) R Zrubáková	7	6
5	(Australia) R McQuillan	4	6	4
LL	(Germany) S Meier	6	3	6
LL	(Bulgaria) E Pampoulova-Wagner	1	4
(Australia) K Godridge	6	6
(France) N van Lottum	4	6^{2}
Q	(France) S Niox-Château	6	7^{7}
(Argentina) I Gorrochategui	6	6
2	(Italy) S Cecchini	4	1

Second round
(France) S Testud	2	3
(Netherlands) N Jagerman	6	6
(Argentina) M Paz	7^{7}	6
3	(Czechoslovakia) R Zrubáková	6^{4}	2
LL	(Germany) S Meier	4	6	7
(Australia) K Godridge	6	3	5
Q	(France) S Niox-Château	6	4	1
(Argentina) I Gorrochategui	2	6	6

Quarterfinals
(Netherlands) N Jagerman	6	5	3
(Argentina) M Paz	1	7	6
LL	(Germany) S Meier	3	5
(Argentina) I Gorrochategui	6	7

Semifinals
(Argentina) M Paz	2	3
(Argentina) I Gorrochategui	6	6
