= 1989 Open Clarins =

- Date: 18–24 September
- Edition: 3rd
- Category: Category 2
- Draw: 32S / 16D
- Prize money: $100,000
- Surface: Clay / outdoor
- Location: Paris, France
- Venue: Racing Club de France

Champions

Singles
- (Italy) Sandra Cecchini

Doubles
- (Italy) Sandra Cecchini / (Italy) Patricia Tarabini
- Open Clarins

The 1989 Open Clarins was a women's tennis tournament played on outdoor clay courts at the Racing Club de France in Paris, France, and was part of the Category 2 tier of the 1989 WTA Tour. It was the third edition of the tournament and was held from 18 September until 24 September 1989. Fourth-seeded Sandra Cecchini won the singles title and earned $17,000 first-prize money.

== Finals ==
=== Singles ===
(Italy) Sandra Cecchini defeated (Czechoslovakia) Regina Rajchrtová 6–4, 6–7^{(5–7)}, 6–1

- It was Cecchini's only title of the year and the 9th of her career.

=== Doubles ===
(Italy) Sandra Cecchini / (Argentina) Patricia Tarabini defeated (France) Nathalie Herreman / (France) Catherine Suire 6–1, 6–1
