= 1992 Open Clarins =

- Date: 14–20 September
- Edition: 6th
- Category: Tier IV
- Draw: 32S / 16D
- Prize money: $150,000
- Surface: Clay / outdoor
- Location: Paris, France
- Venue: Racing Club de France

Champions

Singles
- (Italy) Sandra Cecchini

Doubles
- (Italy) Sandra Cecchini / (Argentina) Patricia Tarabini
← 1991 ·	Clarins Open

The 1992 Open Clarins was a women's tennis tournament played on outdoor clay courts at the Racing Club de France in Paris, France, and was part of the Tier IV category of the 1992 WTA Tour. It was the sixth and last edition of the tournament and was held from 14 September until 20 September 1992. Sixth-seeded Sandra Cecchini won the singles title, her second at the event after 1989, and earned $27,000 first-prize money.

== Finals ==
=== Singles ===
(Italy) Sandra Cecchini defeated (Switzerland) Emanuela Zardo 6–2, 6–1

- It was Cecchini's 1st singles title of the year and the 12th of her career.

=== Doubles ===
(Italy) Sandra Cecchini / (Argentina) Patricia Tarabini defeated (Australia) Rachel McQuillan / (Netherlands) Noëlle van Lottum 7–5, 6–1
