= 1991 Open Clarins =

- Date: 16–22 September
- Edition: 5th
- Category: Tier IV
- Draw: 32S / 16D
- Prize money: $150,000
- Surface: Clay / outdoor
- Location: Paris, France
- Venue: Racing Club de France

Champions

Singles
- (Spain) Conchita Martínez

Doubles
- (Czechoslovakia) Petra Langrová / (Czechoslovakia) Radka Zrubáková
← 1990 ·	Open Clarins	· 1992 →

The 1991 Open Clarins was a women's tennis tournament played on outdoor clay courts at the Racing Club de France in Paris, France, and was part of the Tier IV category of the 1991 WTA Tour. It was the fifth edition of the tournament and was held from 16 September until 22 September 1991. First-seeded Conchita Martínez won her second consecutive singles title at the event and earned $27,000 first-prize money.

== Finals ==
=== Singles ===
(Spain) Conchita Martínez defeated (Argentina) Inés Gorrochategui 6–0, 6–3

- It was Martínez' 3rd singles title of the year and the 10th of her career.

=== Doubles ===
(Czechoslovakia) Petra Langrová / (Czechoslovakia) Radka Zrubáková defeated (France) Alexia Dechaume / (France) Julie Halard 6–4, 6–4
