= 1988 WTA Aix-en-Provence Open =

- Date: 18–24 July
- Edition: Only
- Category: Category 2
- Draw: 56S /24D
- Prize money: $100,000
- Surface: Clay / outdoor
- Location: Aix-en-Provence, France

Champions

Singles
- (Austria) Judith Wiesner

Doubles
- (France) Nathalie Herreman / (France) Catherine Tanvier
WTA Aix-en-Provence Open

The 1988 WTA Aix-en-Provence Open was a women's tennis tournament played on outdoor clay courts in Aix-en-Provence, France and was part of the Category 2 tier of the 1988 WTA Tour. It was the only edition of the tournament ran from 18 July until 24 July 1988. Judith Wiesner won the singles title.

== Finals ==
=== Singles ===
(Austria) Judith Wiesner defeated (West Germany) Sylvia Hanika 6–1, 6–2

- It was Wiesner's 1st title of the year and the 2nd of her career.

=== Doubles ===
(France) Nathalie Herreman / (France) Catherine Tanvier defeated (Italy) Sandra Cecchini / (Spain) Arantxa Sánchez 6–4, 7–5

- It was Herreman's only title of the year and the 3rd of her career. It was Tanvier's 2nd title of the year and the 6th of her career.
