= 1990 French Open – Women's singles qualifying =

Women's singles qualifying
- 1990 French Open

Events
Singles	men	women		boys	girls
Doubles	men	women	mixed	boys	girls
WC Singles	men	women	quad
WC Doubles	men	women	quad
Legends	−45	45+	women

Qualification
Singles	men	women
- French Open

Players who neither had high enough rankings nor received wild cards to enter the main draw of the annual French Open Tennis Championships participated in a qualifying tournament held in the week before the event.

== Seeds ==
1. (Bulgaria) Magdalena Maleeva (qualified)
2. (Czechoslovakia) Leona Lásková (first round)
3. (New Zealand) Claudine Toleafoa (second round)
4. (Japan) Tamaka Takagi (first round)
5. (Canada) Patricia Hy-Boulais (qualified)
6. (Austria) Petra Schwarz (qualified)
7. (United States) Jennifer Santrock (qualifying competition, lucky loser)
8. (Soviet Union) Elena Brioukhovets (qualifying competition)
9. (United States) Katrina Adams (second round)
10. (Peru) Pilar Vásquez (second round)
11. (United Kingdom) Clare Wood (second round)
12. -
13. (United States) Sandy Collins (first round)
14. (Australia) Kristine Kunce (first round)
15. (Canada) Carling Bassett-Seguso (first round)
16. (Denmark) Tine Scheuer-Larsen (first round)

== Qualifiers ==
1. (Bulgaria) Magdalena Maleeva
2. (Switzerland) Céline Cohen
3. (Australia) Kate McDonald
4. (Austria) Petra Schwarz
5. (Poland) Katarzyna Nowak
6. (Brazil) Luciana Corsato-Owsianka
7. (Canada) Patricia Hy-Boulais
8. (Australia) Kirrily Sharpe

== Lucky losers ==
1. (United States) Jennifer Santrock

== Qualifying draw ==
Key

- Q = Qualifier
- WC = Wild card
- LL = Lucky loser
- Alt = Alternate
- ITF = ITF entry
- PR = Protected ranking
- SR = Special ranking
- SE = Special exempt
- JE = Junior exempt
- JR = Junior Accelerator Programme entrant
- CO = College Accelerator Programme entrant
- NG = Next Gen Accelerator Program entrant
- w/o = Walkover
- r = Retired
- d = Defaulted

=== First qualifier ===
First round
1	(Bulgaria) Magdalena Maleeva	6	6
WC	(France) Geraldine Ibrac	0	1
(Czechoslovakia) Andrea Strnadová	7^{7}	7^{7}
(South Africa) Lise Gregory	6^{4}	6^{3}
(United States) Luanne Spadea	6	6
(Sweden) Maria Ekstrand	2	1
(Brazil) Sabrina Giusto	0	5
Alt	(France) Florence Gauvain	6	7

Second round
1	(Bulgaria) Magdalena Maleeva	6	6
(Czechoslovakia) Andrea Strnadová	3	4
(United States) Luanne Spadea	6	6
Alt	(France) Florence Gauvain	4	2

Qualifying competition
1	(Bulgaria) Magdalena Maleeva	6	6
(United States) Luanne Spadea	0	2

=== Second qualifier ===
First round
15	(Canada) Carling Bassett-Seguso	3	2
(Netherlands) Caroline Vis	6	6
(Switzerland) Céline Cohen	6	6
(Netherlands) Carin Bakkum	3	3
(South Africa) Karen Schimper	6	5	5
WC	(France) Carole Lucarelli	2	7	7
WC	(France) Caroline Dhenin	1	6	2
7	(United States) Jennifer Santrock	6	4	6

Second round
(Netherlands) Caroline Vis	2	4
(Switzerland) Céline Cohen	6	6
WC	(France) Carole Lucarelli	2	6^{1}
7	(United States) Jennifer Santrock	6	7^{7}

Qualifying competition
(Switzerland) Céline Cohen	6	6
7	(United States) Jennifer Santrock	2	2

=== Third qualifier ===
First round
3	(New Zealand) Claudine Toleafoa	6	6
(United States) Karen Shin	1	0
WC	(France) Axelle Thomas	2	1
(New Zealand) Ruth Seeman	6	6
(Czechoslovakia) Michaela Frimmelová	1	2
(Australia) Kate McDonald	6	6
(United States) Beth Herr	7^{7}	7^{7}
14	(Australia) Kristine Kunce	6^{1}	6^{2}

Second round
3	(New Zealand) Claudine Toleafoa	5	6	3
(New Zealand) Ruth Seeman	7	4	6
(Australia) Kate McDonald	6	5
(United States) Beth Herr	2	2^{r}

Qualifying competition
(New Zealand) Ruth Seeman	3	2
(Australia) Kate McDonald	6	6

=== Fourth qualifier ===
First round
9	(United States) Katrina Adams	6	6
(Sweden) Jonna Jonerup	4	2
(Japan) Ei Iida	7^{7}	3	2
(West Germany) Barbara Rittner	6^{3}	6	6
(Indonesia) Yayuk Basuki	2	4
(Belgium) Ann Devries	6	6
(Australia) Rennae Stubbs	1	1
6	(Austria) Petra Schwarz	6	6

Second round
9	(United States) Katrina Adams	1	2
(West Germany) Barbara Rittner	6	6
(Belgium) Ann Devries	7	3	1
6	(Austria) Petra Schwarz	5	6	6

Qualifying competition
(West Germany) Barbara Rittner	3	7^{9}	1
6	(Austria) Petra Schwarz	6	6^{7}	6

=== Fifth qualifier ===
First round
8	(Soviet Union) Elena Brioukhovets	6	6
(Denmark) Sofie Albinus	0	0
(Finland) Petra Thorén	6	6
(Netherlands) Titia Wilmink	0	3
(France) Sybille Niox-Château	6	2	8
(Sweden) Maria Lindström	4	6	6
(Poland) Katarzyna Nowak	6	6
16	(Denmark) Tine Scheuer-Larsen	2	3

Second round
8	(Soviet Union) Elena Brioukhovets	6	3	6
(Finland) Petra Thorén	3	6	2
(France) Sybille Niox-Château	2	3
(Poland) Katarzyna Nowak	6	6

Qualifying competition
8	(Soviet Union) Elena Brioukhovets	5	7	2
(Poland) Katarzyna Nowak	7	5	6

=== Sixth qualifier ===
First round
10	(Peru) Pilar Vásquez	6	6
(Finland) Anne Aallonen	4	3
(Brazil) Gisele Miró	3	4
(Australia) Tracey Morton-Rodgers	6	6
(Brazil) Luciana Corsato-Owsianka	6	7^{7}
(Australia) Nicole Pratt	1	6^{2}
(Hungary) Réka Szikszay	6	6
4	(Japan) Tamaka Takagi	1	3

Second round
10	(Peru) Pilar Vásquez	6	3	3
(Australia) Tracey Morton-Rodgers	2	6	6
(Brazil) Luciana Corsato-Owsianka	6^{5}	6	6
(Hungary) Réka Szikszay	7^{7}	2	4

Qualifying competition
(Australia) Tracey Morton-Rodgers	4	4
(Brazil) Luciana Corsato-Owsianka	6	6

=== Seventh qualifier ===
First round
5	(Canada) Patricia Hy-Boulais	3	6	6
WC	(France) Alexandra Fusai	6	4	0
(Australia) Jenny Byrne	1	6	1
(South Africa) Robyn Field	6	2	6
WC	(France) Marie-Pierre Villani	6	6
(West Germany) Angela Kerek	2	1
WC	(France) Olivia Gravereaux	1	6	6
13	(United States) Sandy Collins	6	0	2

Second round
5	(Canada) Patricia Hy-Boulais	7	6
(South Africa) Robyn Field	5	2
WC	(France) Marie-Pierre Villani	6	2	4
WC	(France) Olivia Gravereaux	4	6	6

Qualifying competition
5	(Canada) Patricia Hy-Boulais	6	6
WC	(France) Olivia Gravereaux	2	3

=== Eighth qualifier ===
First round
11	(United Kingdom) Clare Wood	6	5	6
(Italy) Marzia Grossi	3	7	1
(Argentina) Adriana Villagrán	6	1	2
(Australia) Kirrily Sharpe	2	6	6
WC	(France) Nathalie Housset	6	6
(Austria) Heidi Sprung	2	1
(Austria) Marion Maruska	7	6
2	(Czechoslovakia) Leona Lásková	5	1

Second round
11	(United Kingdom) Clare Wood	3	4
(Australia) Kirrily Sharpe	6	6
WC	(France) Nathalie Housset	0	6^{2}
(Austria) Marion Maruska	6	7^{7}

Qualifying competition
(Australia) Kirrily Sharpe	7^{7}	6
(Austria) Marion Maruska	6^{4}	4
