= Catherine Bonnet =

French tennis player (1965–2023)

- Country (sports): France
- Born: 5 March 1965
- Died: 5 February 2023 (aged 57); Nouméa, New Caledonia
- Prize money: $16,525

Singles
- Career record: 37–29
- Career titles: 1 ITF
- Highest ranking: No. 192 (1 August 1988)

Grand Slam singles results
- Australian Open: Q3 (1989)
- French Open: Q3 (1988)
- US Open: Q1 (1988)

Doubles
- Career record: 7–12
- Highest ranking: No. 388 (20 June 1988)

Catherine Bonnet (5 March 1965 – 5 February 2023) was a French professional tennis player.

Bonnet competed on the professional tour during the 1980s and had a career high ranking of 192 in the world. Her best performance in a WTA Tour tournament came at the 1988 Aix-en-Provence Open, where she reached the third round with wins over Sabine Auer and Julie Halard.

Bonnet died in Nouméa, New Caledonia on 5 February 2023, at the age of 57.

== ITF finals ==
=== Singles: 2 (1–1) ===
Result	Date	Tournament	Surface	Opponent	Score
Loss	10 July 1983	Landskrona, Sweden	Clay	(United Kingdom) Shelley Walpole	5–7, 4–6
Win	27 March 1988	Reims, France	Clay	(West Germany) Silke Frankl	6–4, 7–6
