= Kostelec u Křížků =

- Municipality
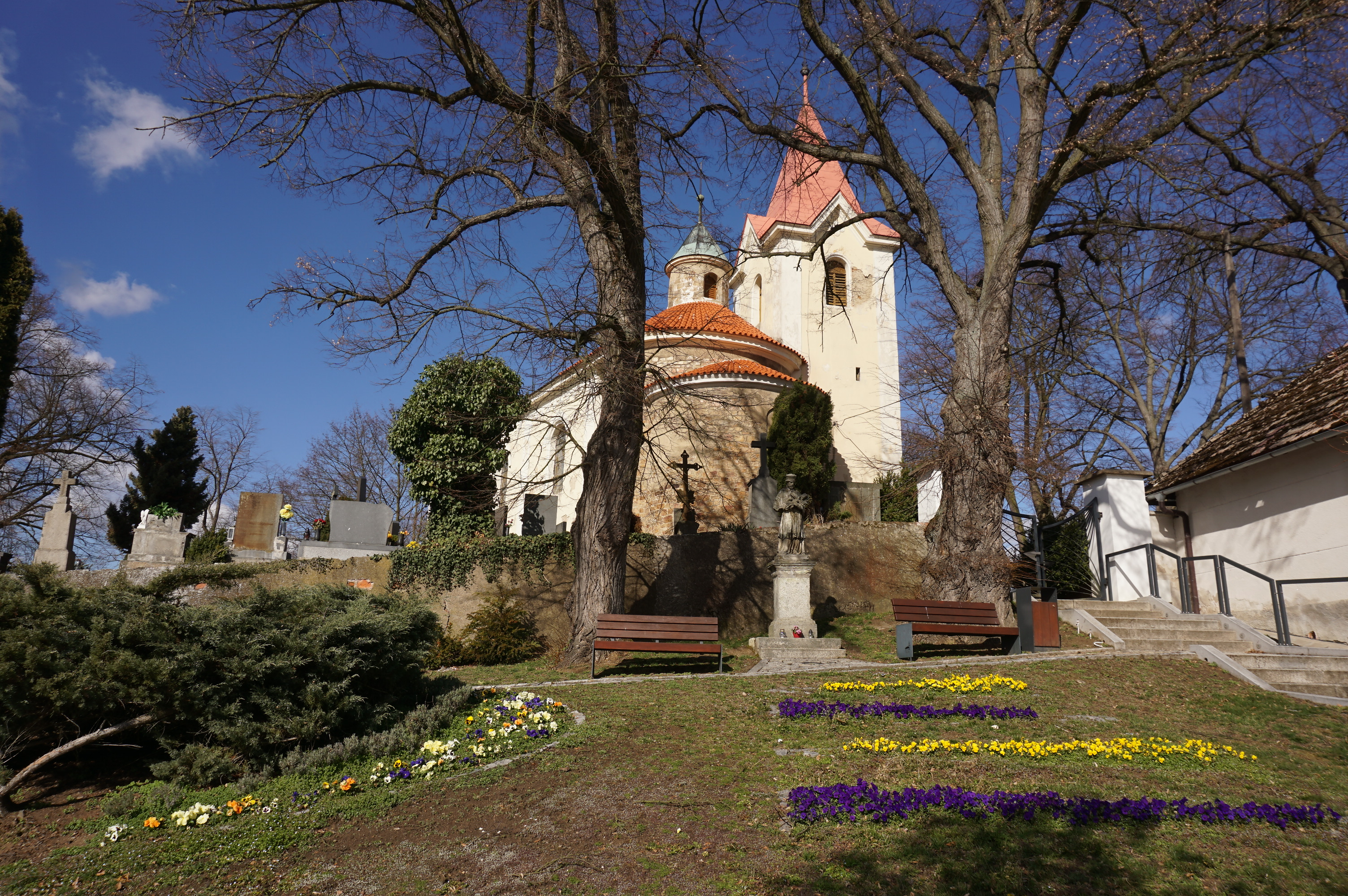
- Rotunda and Church of Saint Martin

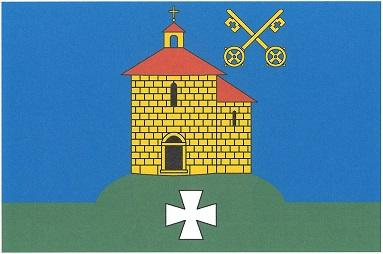
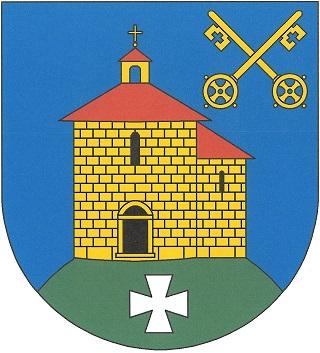
- Flag Coat of arms

- Location in the Czech Republic
- Coordinates: 49°54′26″N 14°33′26″E
- Country: Czech Republic
- Region: Central Bohemian
- District: Prague-East
- Founded: 922

Area
  - Total: 4.10 km^{2} (1.58 sq mi)
- Elevation: 411 m (1,348 ft)

Population (2026-01-01)
  - Total: 784
  - Density: 191/km^{2} (495/sq mi)
- Time zone: UTC+1 (CET)
  - Summer (DST): UTC+2 (CEST)
- Postal code: 251 68
- Website: www.kostelecukrizku.cz

Kostelec u Křížků is a municipality and village in Prague-East District in the Central Bohemian Region of the Czech Republic. It has about 800 inhabitants.

== History ==
The settlement was founded here in 922. In 992, the construction of the Romanesque rotunda of the Church of Saint Martin began, and finished in 1151.

== Demographics ==
Historical population
Year	Pop.	±%
1869	447	—
1880	344	−23.0%
1890	366	+6.4%
1900	359	−1.9%
1910	405	+12.8%
1921	412	+1.7%
1930	369	−10.4%
1950	354	−4.1%
1961	339	−4.2%
1970	367	+8.3%
1980	386	+5.2%
1991	381	−1.3%
2001	439	+15.2%
2011	583	+32.8%
2021	792	+35.8%
Source: Censuses
