= 1987 Open Clarins =

- Date: 28 September – 4 October
- Edition: 1st
- Category: 1
- Draw: 32S / 16D
- Prize money: $50,000
- Surface: Clay / outdoor
- Location: Paris, France

Champions

Singles
- (Socialist Federal Republic of Yugoslavia) Sabrina Goleš

Doubles
- (France) Isabelle Demongeot (France) Nathalie Tauziat
Open Clarins	· 1988 →

The 1987 Open Clarins was a women's tennis tournament played on outdoor clay courts in Paris, France, and was part of the Category 1 tier of the 1987 WTA Tour. It was the inaugural edition of the tournament and was held from 28 September until 4 October 1987. Unseeded Sabrina Goleš won the singles title and earned $10,000 first-prize money.

== Finals ==
=== Singles ===
(Socialist Federal Republic of Yugoslavia) Sabrina Goleš defeated (Belgium) Sandra Wasserman 7–5, 6–1

- It was Goleš' only singles title of her career.

=== Doubles ===
(France) Isabelle Demongeot / (France) Nathalie Tauziat defeated (Italy) Sandra Cecchini / (Italy) Sabrina Goleš 1–6, 6–3, 6–3
