= Southern Cross Classic =

Defunct tennis tournament
- Event name: Southern Cross Classic (1988)
- Tour: WTA Tour (1988)
- Founded: 1988
- Abolished: 1988
- Surface: Hard (1988)

The Southern Cross Classic is a defunct WTA Tour affiliated tennis tournament played in 1988. It was held in Adelaide in Australia and played on outdoor hard courts.

== Finals ==
=== Singles ===
| Year | Champion | Runner-up | Score |
|---|---|---|---|
| 1988 | (Czechoslovakia) Jana Novotná | (Czechoslovakia) Jana Pospíšilová | 7–5, 6–4 |

=== Doubles ===
| Year | Champions | Runners-up | Score |
|---|---|---|---|
| 1988 | (West Germany) Sylvia Hanika (West Germany) Claudia Kohde-Kilsch | (United States) Lori McNeil (Czechoslovakia) Jana Novotná | 7–5, 6–7, 6–4 |
