= WTA Aix-en-Provence Open =

Defunct tennis tournament
- Event name: Aix-en-Provence Open (1988)
- Tour: WTA Tour (1988)
- Founded: 1988
- Abolished: 1988
- Editions: 1
- Location: Aix-en-Provence, France
- Surface: Clay (1988)

The WTA Aix-en-Provence Open is a defunct WTA Tour affiliated tennis tournament played in 1988. It was held in Aix-en-Provence in France and played on outdoor clay courts.

== Results ==
=== Singles ===
Year	Champion	Runner-up	Score
1988	(Austria) Judith Wiesner	(West Germany) Sylvia Hanika	6–1, 6–2

=== Doubles ===
Year	Champions	Runners-up	Score
1988	(France) Nathalie Herreman (France) Catherine Tanvier	(Italy) Sandra Cecchini (Spain) Arantxa Sánchez	6–4, 7–5
