= Florence Gauvain =

French tennis player

- Country (sports): France
- Born: 25 March 1962 (age 62)
- Prize money: $8,222

Singles
- Career record: 31–24
- Highest ranking: No. 297 (11 Sep 1989)

Grand Slam singles results
- French Open: Q2 (1990)

Doubles
- Career record: 5–10
- Highest ranking: No. 520 (6 Nov 1989)

Florence Gauvain (born 25 March 1962) is a French former professional tennis player.

Gauvain had a career high singles ranking of 297 and appeared three times in the qualifying draw for the French Open.

On the WTA Tour, Gauvain made two main draw appearance at the Clarins Open in Paris. In 1988 she won her first round match (over Louise Field) and in 1989 she took the fifth seed Bettina Fulco to three sets in a first round loss.

Both her husband Hervé Gauvain and daughter Sybille Gauvain have played professional tennis.

== ITF finals ==
=== Singles: 1 (0–1) ===
Outcome	No.	Date	Tournament	Surface	Opponent	Score
Runner-up	1.	20 August 1989	Rebecq, Belgium	Clay	(Netherlands) Sandra Begijn	4–6, 1–6
