= Sylvie Sabas =

French tennis player

- Full name: Sylvie Sabas-Legris
- Country (sports): France
- Born: 19 February 1972 (age 53)
- Retired: 1996
- Prize money: $70,885

Singles
- Career record: 87-84
- Career titles: 2 ITF
- Highest ranking: No. 152 (26 July 1993)

Grand Slam singles results
- French Open: 1R (1990, 1993)

Doubles
- Career record: 28-40
- Career titles: 1 ITF
- Highest ranking: No. 134 (15 October 1990)

Grand Slam doubles results
- French Open: 2R (1988, 1990)

Sylvie Sabas-Legris (born 19 February 1972) is a French former professional tennis player.

Sabas was the 16 and under Orange Bowl champion in 1988. On the professional tour she reached a best singles ranking of 152 in the world. She featured twice in the French Open main draw for singles and made six main draw appearances in doubles. She now works as a sophrologist and is based in Nantes.

== ITF finals ==
=== Singles (2–1) ===
Legend
$25,000 tournaments
$10,000 tournaments

Result	No.	Date	Tournament	Surface	Opponent	Score
Loss	1.	22 January 1990	Helsinki, Finland	Carpet	(Norway) Amy Jönsson Raaholt	6–4, 4–6, 3–6
Win	2.	3 February 1992	Swansea, United Kingdom	Hard	(Czechoslovakia) Jitka Dubcová	6–1, 6–1
Win	3.	22 March 1993	Brest, France	Hard	(Belgium) Nancy Feber	6–3, 6–4

=== Doubles (1–1) ===
Result	No.	Date	Tournament	Surface	Partner	Opponents	Score
Win	1.	6 August 1990	Budapest, Hungary	Clay	(France) Sandrine Testud	(Czechoslovakia) Denisa Krajčovičová (Czechoslovakia) Alice Noháčová	6–3, 6–4
Loss	2.	8 May 1995	Le Touquet, France	Clay	(Greece) Julia Apostoli	(France) Amélie Mauresmo (United Kingdom) Amanda Wainwright	4–6, 2–6
