= Nathalie Guerrée-Spitzer =

French tennis player

Nathalie Guerrée
- Full name: Nathalie Guerrée-Spitzer
- Country (sports): France
- Born: 7 July 1968 (age 57)
- Prize money: $107,345

Singles
- Highest ranking: No. 109 (30 January 1989)

Grand Slam singles results
- Australian Open: 3R (1989)
- French Open: 2R (1989, 1991)
- Wimbledon: 1R (1989)

Doubles
- Highest ranking: No. 280 (20 June 1988)

Grand Slam doubles results
- French Open: 1R (1988, 1989, 1990, 1992)

Nathalie Guerrée-Spitzer (born 7 July 1968) is a former professional tennis player from France.

== Biography ==
=== Tennis career ===
Guerrée, a right-handed player, began competing on the WTA Tour in 1988. Her best performances on tour was a quarter-final appearance at the 1988 WTA Aix-en-Provence Open, which included a win over Nathalie Tauziat. She also won WTA Tour matches tour against Silvia Farina and Irina Spîrlea.

She first featured in the singles main draw of a grand slam at the 1988 French Open, where she lost to eventual champion Steffi Graf in the opening round. Over the next four year she competed in every edition of the tournament and twice reached the second round. In 1989 she competed in the main draws at the Australian Open and Wimbledon, making the third round of the former.

== Personal life ==
Guerrée comes from the French region of Lorraine. She became Nathalie Guerrée-Spitzer after marriage and has four daughters.

== ITF finals ==
=== Singles (0–2) ===
Legend
$25,000 tournaments
$10,000 tournaments

Result	No.	Date	Tournament	Surface	Opponent	Score
Loss	1.	21 March 1988	Bayonne, France	Hard	(France) Alexia Dechaume-Balleret	3–6, 6–3, 5–7
Loss	2.	10 April 1994	Limoges, France	Hard (i)	(Austria) Sylvia Plischke	6–1, 4–6, 2–6

=== Doubles (0–1) ===
Result	No.	Date	Tournament	Surface	Partner	Opponents	Score
Loss	1.	20 July 1987	Sezze, Italy	Clay	(France) Federika Hugonnet	(Switzerland) Cristina Casini (Italy) Simona Isidori	2–6, 1–6
