= Emmanuelle Derly =

French tennis player

- Country (sports): France
- Born: 30 April 1970 (age 56)
- Turned pro: 1985
- Retired: 1991
- Prize money: $81,256

Singles
- Career record: 80-80
- Career titles: 1 ITF
- Highest ranking: No. 115 (1 February 1988)

Grand Slam singles results
- Australian Open: 2R (1989)
- French Open: 2R (1985,1988)
- US Open: 2R (1987)

Doubles
- Career record: 36-45
- Career titles: 1 WTA, 1 ITF
- Highest ranking: No. 49 (05 June 1989)

Grand Slam doubles results
- Australian Open: 3R (1989)
- French Open: 2R (1987, 1990)
- Wimbledon: 3R (1988)
- US Open: 1R (1988)

Emmanuelle Derly (born 30 April 1970) is a French former professional tennis player. In 1988, she was French Open girls’ doubles champion with Alexia Dechaume and was the runner-up in Wimbledon in the girls’ singles final, losing to Brenda Schultz 6–7(5), 1–6. Derly played for France in the 1985 Federation Cup. She also won the Clarins Open in 1988 with Alexia Dechaume.

== WTA career finals ==
=== Doubles: 2 (1–1) ===
Legend
Grand Slam	0
Tier I	0
Tier II	0
Tier III	0
Tier IV & V	1

Titles by surface
Hard	0
Clay	1
Grass	0
Carpet	0

Result	Date	Tournament	Surface	Partner	Opponents	Score
Win	Sep 1988	Paris Open, France	Clay	(France) Alexia Dechaume	(Australia) Louise Field (France) Nathalie Herreman	6–0, 6–2
Loss	May 1989	Taranto Trophy, Italy	Clay	(France) Sophie Amiach	(Socialist Federal Republic of Yugoslavia) Sabrina Goleš (Argentina) Mercedes Paz	2–6, 2–6

== ITF finals ==
$25,000 tournaments
$10,000 tournaments

=== Singles (1-1) ===
Result	No.	Date	Tournament	Surface	Opponent	Score
Loss	1.	10 April 1989	Limoges, France	Clay	(France) Sandrine Testud	6–3, 3–6, 4–6
Win	2.	15 July 1991	Frinton-on-Sea, United Kingdom	Grass	(United Kingdom) Virginia Humphreys-Davies	6–3, 6–3

=== Doubles (1-3) ===
Result	No	Date	Tournament	Surface	Partner	Opponents	Score
Loss	1.	12 May 1986	Lee-on-the-Solent, United Kingdom	Clay	(Netherlands) Hellas ter Riet	(Netherlands) Carin Bakkum (Netherlands) Nicole Jagerman	6–7, 6–3, 1–6
Win	2.	10 April 1989	Limoges, France	Clay	(South Africa) Michelle Anderson	(South Africa) Robyn Field (Sweden) Eva Lena Olsson	7–5, 6–0
Loss	3.	27 August 1990	Palermo, Italy	Clay	(Austria) Sandra Reichel	(Netherlands) Ingelise Driehuis (Australia) Louise Pleming	1–6, 1–6
Loss	4.	3 September 1990	Arzachena, Italy	Hard	(Australia) Louise Pleming	(United Kingdom) Belinda Borneo (United Kingdom) Julie Salmon	1–6, 6–4, 3–6
