= Jana Pospíšilová =

Czech tennis player

- Country (sports): Czechoslovakia; Czech Republic
- Born: 23 March 1970 (age 55) Kostelec u Křížků, Czechoslovakia
- Retired: 1998
- Prize money: $237,965

Singles
- Career record: 188-156
- Career titles: 6 ITF
- Highest ranking: No. 49 (13 February 1989)

Grand Slam singles results
- Australian Open: 2R (1990)
- French Open: 2R (1988, 1989)
- Wimbledon: 1R (1989, 1990)
- US Open: 1R (1989, 1990)

Doubles
- Career record: 138-103
- Career titles: 15 ITF
- Highest ranking: No. 83 (13 May 1991)

Grand Slam doubles results
- Australian Open: 1R (1990, 1991)
- French Open: 2R (1988)
- Wimbledon: 2R (1990, 1992)
- US Open: 1R (1989, 1990)

Jana Rychlá (born Jana Pospíšilová on 23 March 1970) is a former professional tennis player from the Czech Republic.

== Career ==
As a junior, Pospíšilová was a member of the Czechoslovak team which won the 1986 World Youth Cup in Japan and she was runner-up to Natasha Zvereva in the girls' singles at the 1987 French Open.

In both 1988 and 1989 she competed for Czechoslovakia in the Federation Cup. When Czechoslovakia won the competition in 1988, Pospíšilová featured in all five World Group matches, as the doubles partner of Jana Novotná. The pair were unbeaten until losing in the final to the USSR, but Czechoslovakia had already secured the title after winning both singles matches. In 1989 she played in two ties, again as a doubles player, this time partnering Regina Rajchrtová.

Pospíšilová began competing on the WTA Tour in 1988. In her first season she had a win over second-seeded Helena Suková in a match at the 1988 European Indoors and lost the final of the Southern Cross Classic to Fed Cup teammate Jana Novotná, to finish at 50th in the year-end rankings. She peaked at 49 in the world early in 1989. Other career highlights include wins over Hana Mandlíková at the 1989 Canadian Open held in Toronto and victory against Pam Shriver at the 1990 NSW Open in Sydney. At the 1990 Athens Trophy, Pospíšilová partnered with Leona Lásková to reach her only career doubles final. The final was decided by a last set tie-break, which they lost 6–8 to Laura Garrone and Karin Kschwendt.

== Personal life ==
Pospíšilová's is the elder sister of Czech tennis player Jaroslav Pospíšil.

She has been married to Czech actor Petr Rychlý since 2006.

== WTA Tour career finals ==
=== Singles: 1 runner-up ===
Result	Date	Tournament	Tier	Surface	Opponent	Score
Loss	Nov 1988	Adelaide, Australia	Tier II	Hard	(Czechoslovakia) Jana Novotná	5–7, 4–6

=== Doubles: 1 runner-up ===
Result	Date	Tournament	Tier	Surface	Partner	Opponents	Score
Loss	Sep 1990	Athens, Greece	Tier V	Clay	(Czechoslovakia) Leona Lásková	(Italy) Laura Garrone (Luxembourg) Karin Kschwendt	0–6, 6–1, 6–7^{(6)}

== ITF finals ==
Legend
$75,000 tournaments
$50,000 tournaments
$25,000 tournaments
$10,000 tournaments

=== Singles (6–3) ===
Result	No.	Date	Tournament	Surface	Opponent	Score
Loss	1.	19 January 1987	Stockholm, Sweden	Carpet	(Sweden) Catrin Jexell	3–6, 1–6
Win	1.	28 September 1987	Bol, Yugoslavia	Clay	(Luxembourg) Karin Kschwendt	6–3, 6–3
Win	2.	12 October 1987	Mali Lošinj, Yugoslavia	Clay	(Luxembourg) Karin Kschwendt	6–4, 6–4
Loss	2.	29 July 1991	Acireale, Italy	Clay	(China) Li Fang	0–6, 5–7
Win	3.	4 December 1995	Přerov, Czech Republic	Hard	(Slovenia) Petra Rampre	6–2, 7–6^{(3)}
Loss	3.	17 December 1995	Ostrava, Czech Republic	Hard	(Slovakia) Katarína Studeníková	4–6, 3–6
Win	4.	19 February 1996	Nürnberg, Germany	Carpet (i)	(Russia) Ekaterina Sysoeva	6–3, 6–3
Win	5.	3 November 1996	Stockholm, Sweden	Hard	(France) Laurence Andretto	6–4, 1–6, 6–2
Win	6.	2 June 1997	Bytom, Poland	Clay	(Switzerland) Miroslava Vavrinec	7–6^{(4)}, 6–7^{(0)}, 6–1

=== Doubles (15–6) ===
Result	No.	Date	Tournament	Surface	Partner	Opponents	Score
Win	1.	29 September 1986	Šibenik, Yugoslavia	Clay	(Czechoslovakia) Petra Langrová	(Czechoslovakia) Denisa Krajčovičová (Czechoslovakia) Radka Zrubáková	6–1, 6–2
Win	2.	6 October 1986	Mali Lošinj, Yugoslavia	Clay	(Czechoslovakia) Petra Langrová	(Czechoslovakia) Denisa Krajčovičová (Czechoslovakia) Radka Zrubáková	6–3, 7–6
Loss	1.	13 October 1986	Rabac, Yugoslavia	Clay	(Czechoslovakia) Petra Langrová	(Czechoslovakia) Denisa Krajčovičová (Czechoslovakia) Radka Zrubáková	3–6, 2–6
Win	3.	3 August 1987	Rheda, West Germany	Clay	(Czechoslovakia) Hana Fukárková	(Czechoslovakia) Nora Bajčíková (Czechoslovakia) Denisa Krajčovičová	6–2, 6–0
Win	4.	20 August 1987	Darmstadt, West Germany	Clay	(Czechoslovakia) Hana Fukárková	(Czechoslovakia) Nora Bajčíková (Czechoslovakia) Denisa Krajčovičová	6–3, 6–0
Loss	2.	12 October 1987	Mali Lošinj, Yugoslavia	Clay	(Czechoslovakia) Denisa Krajčovičová	(Czechoslovakia) Michaela Frimmelová (Czechoslovakia) Petra Holubová	5–7, 6–4, 5–7
Win	5.	17 June 1991	Modena, Italy	Clay	(Czechoslovakia) Denisa Krajčovičová	(Netherlands) Yvonne Grubben (Netherlands) Stephanie Rottier	6–1, 6–4
Win	6.	2 September 1991	Arzachena, Italy	Hard	(Finland) Nanne Dahlman	(Israel) Ilana Berger (Australia) Louise Pleming	3–6, 6–3, 6–1
Loss	3.	30 March 1992	Moncalieri, Italy	Clay	(Czechoslovakia) Radka Bobková	(Russia) Elena Makarova (Czechoslovakia) Kateřina Šišková	4–6, 6–2, 2–6
Win	7.	6 April 1992	Caserta, Italy	Clay	(Czechoslovakia) Radka Bobková	(Spain) Estefanía Bottini (Spain) Virginia Ruano Pascual	6–3, 2–6, 7–6
Win	8.	31 August 1992	Klagenfurt, Austria	Clay	(Czechoslovakia) Denisa Krajčovičová	(Germany) Katja Oeljeklaus (Germany) Heike Thoms	w/o
Loss	4.	14 September 1992	Karlovy Vary, Czechoslovakia	Clay	(Czechoslovakia) Kateřina Šišková	(Sweden) Maria Lindström (Sweden) Maria Strandlund	1–6, 2–6
Win	9.	29 March 1993	Moulins, France	Hard	(Latvia) Agnese Gustmane	(France) Isabelle Demongeot (France) Catherine Suire	3–6, 6–2, 6–4
Win	10.	6 September 1993	Klagenfurt, Austria	Clay	(Czech Republic) Květa Peschke	(Czech Republic) Ivana Jankovská (Czech Republic) Eva Melicharová	6–4, 7–6
Loss	5.	7 March 1994	Prostějov, Czech Republic	Hard	(Czech Republic) Květa Peschke	(Netherlands) Lara Bitter (Netherlands) Maaike Koutstaal	5–7, 3–6
Win	11.	17 October 1994	Flensburg, Germany	Carpet	(Czech Republic) Kateřina Šišková	(Germany) Kirstin Freye (Germany) Silke Meier	6–2, 4–6, 6–2
Loss	6.	20 November 1994	Bad Gögging, Germany	Carpet (i)	(Czech Republic) Kateřina Šišková	(Romania) Cătălina Cristea (Serbia and Montenegro) Tatjana Ječmenica	6–3, 3–6, 2–6
Win	12.	12 August 1996	Lohmar, Germany	Clay	(Czech Republic) Alena Vašková	(Czech Republic) Michaela Paštiková (Czech Republic) Jitka Schönfeldová	6–7^{(1)}, 6–3, 6–3
Win	13.	1 September 1997	Spoleto, Italy	Clay	(Czech Republic) Kateřina Šišková	(Spain) Ana Alcázar (Spain) Eva Bes	6–1, 6–0
Win	14.	22 September 1997	Thessaloniki, Greece	Clay	(Czech Republic) Radka Bobková	(Russia) Maria Goloviznina (Russia) Evgenia Kulikovskaya	6–2, 6–3
Win	15.	17 August 1998	Valašské Meziříčí, Czech Republic	Clay	(Germany) Magdalena Kučerová	(Poland) Katharzyna Teodorowicz (Poland) Anna Bieleń-Żarska	6–3, 4–6, 7–6^{(5)}
