= Regina Rajchrtová =

Czech tennis player

- Country (sports): Czechoslovakia
- Born: 5 February 1968 (age 58) Havlíčkův Brod, Czechoslovakia
- Retired: 1993
- Prize money: $353,866

Singles
- Career record: 143–98
- Career titles: 0
- Highest ranking: No. 26 (1 April 1991)

Grand Slam singles results
- Australian Open: 2R (1991, 92)
- French Open: 3R (1991)
- Wimbledon: 2R (1990)
- US Open: 4R (1989, 1991)

Doubles
- Career record: 82-82
- Career titles: 0
- Highest ranking: No. 45 (27 August 1990)

Grand Slam doubles results
- Australian Open: 1R (1990, 91, 92)
- French Open: QF (1990)
- Wimbledon: 3R (1991)
- US Open: 1R (1989, 90, 91)

Regina Rajchrtová, married Kordová (born 5 February 1968), is a former professional tennis player from Czechoslovakia who competed for her native country at the 1988 Summer Olympics in Seoul. On 1 April 1991 she reached a career high singles ranking of 26, while on 27 August 1990 she reached a career high doubles ranking of 45.

== Personal life ==
Rajchrtová married fellow tennis player Petr Korda, and the couple have two daughters and a son: Jessica Regina (born 1993), Nelly (born 1998) and Sebastian (born 2000). Jessica and Nelly are professional golfers, while Sebastian is a professional tennis player.

== ITF finals ==
=== Singles (2–3) ===
Legend
$25,000 tournaments
$10,000 tournaments

| Result | No. | Date | Tournament | Surface | Opponent | Score |
|---|---|---|---|---|---|---|
| Win | 1. | 6 October 1986 | Mali Lošinj, Yugoslavia | Hard | (West Germany) Heike Thoms | 6–2, 6–3 |
| Loss | 2. | 9 February 1987 | Reims, France | Clay | (France) Marie-Christine Damas | 1–6, 6–2, 2–6 |
| Win | 3. | 16 February 1987 | Mald, France | Clay | (Belgium) Ilse de Ruysscher | 6–1, 6–1 |
| Loss | 4. | 30 March 1987 | Limoges, France | Clay | (France) Nathalie Tauziat | 1–6, 6–2, 1–6 |
| Loss | 5. | 3 May 1987 | Taranto, Italy | Clay | (Soviet Union) Natasha Zvereva | 6–7, 6–4, 3–6 |

=== Doubles (3-3) ===
| Result | No. | Date | Tournament | Surface | Partner | Opponents | Score |
|---|---|---|---|---|---|---|---|
| Win | 1. | 8 October 1984 | Sofia, Bulgaria | Clay | (Czechoslovakia) Alice Noháčová | (Czechoslovakia) Regina Maršíková (Socialist Federal Republic of Yugoslavia) Renata Šašak | 6–2, 7–5 |
| Win | 2. | 28 October 1985 | Peterborough, United Kingdom | Hard | (Czechoslovakia) Jana Novotná | (West Germany) Claudia Porwik (West Germany) Wiltrud Probst | 5–7, 6–3, 6–4 |
| Loss | 3. | 18 November 1985 | Cheshire, United Kingdom | Carpet | (Czechoslovakia) Jana Novotná | (United Kingdom) Belinda Borneo (United Kingdom) Joy Tacon | 2–6, 3–6 |
| Loss | 4. | 5 May 1986 | Bournemouth, United Kingdom | Grass | (Czechoslovakia) Petra Tesarová | (Soviet Union) Natalia Egorova (Soviet Union) Natasha Zvereva | 1–6, 2–6 |
| Winner | 5. | 1 December 1986 | Budapest, Hungary | Clay | (Czechoslovakia) Jana Novotná | (Czechoslovakia) Denisa Krajčovičová (Czechoslovakia) Radka Zrubáková | 6–1, 6–7, 6–3 |
| Loss | 6. | 9 February 1987 | Reims, France | Clay | (West Germany) Andrea Vopat | (United States) Erika Smith (Hungary) Reeka Szikszay | 4–6, 3–6 |
