= Patricia Tarabini =

Argentine tennis player and coach (born 1968)

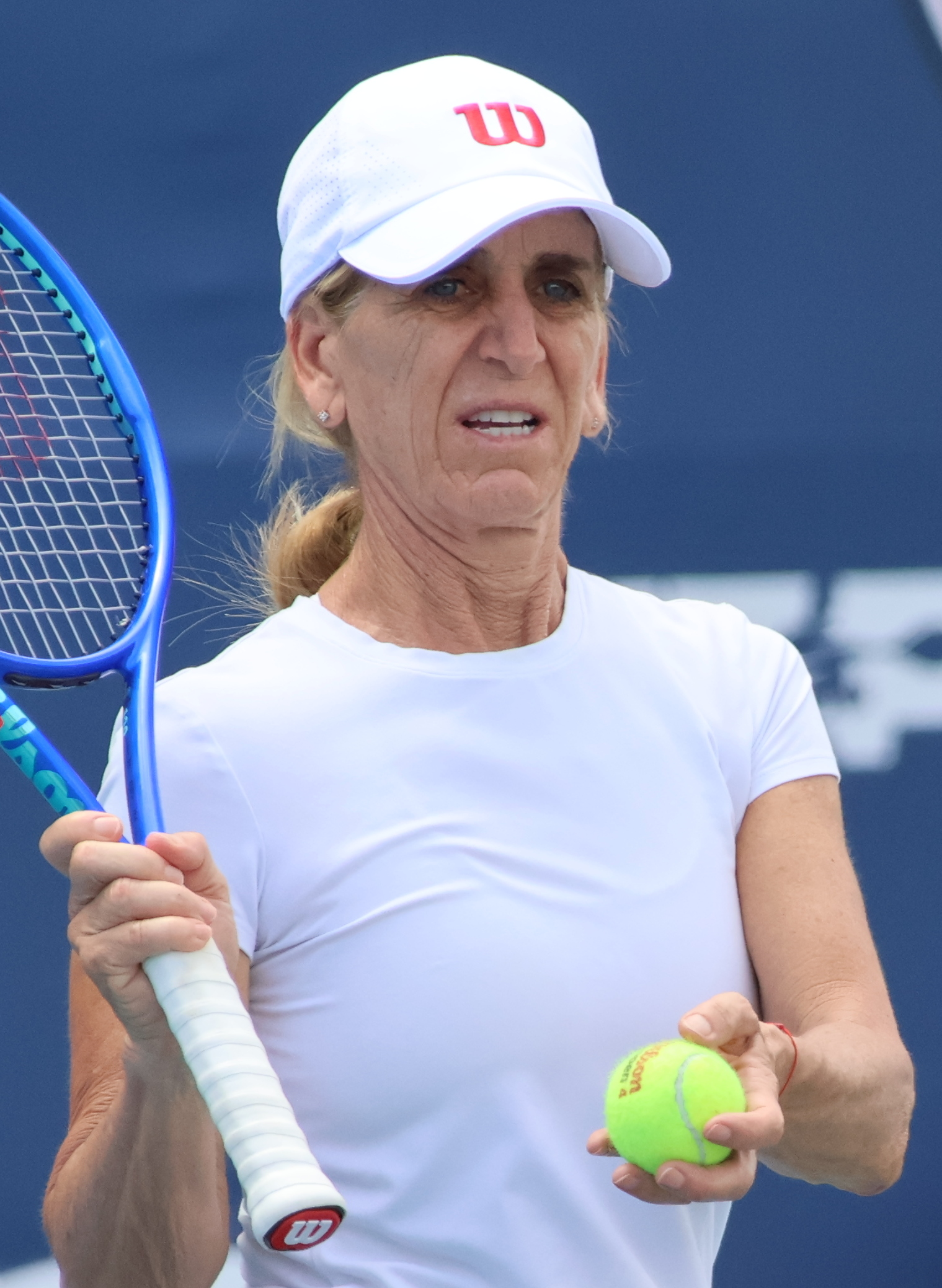
- Tarabini in 2025
- Country (sports): Argentina
- Residence: Key Biscayne, Florida, U.S.
- Born: 6 August 1968 (age 58) La Plata, Argentina
- Height: 1.65 m (5 ft 5 in)
- Turned pro: 1986
- Retired: 2006
- Plays: Right-handed (one-handed backhand)
- Prize money: $1,541,551

Singles
- Career record: 147–143
- Career titles: 2 ITF
- Highest ranking: No. 29 (9 May 1988)

Grand Slam singles results
- Australian Open: 2R (1991, 1994, 1995)
- French Open: 3R (1990)
- Wimbledon: 2R (1994)
- US Open: 3R (1987, 1989)

Doubles
- Career record: 449–347
- Career titles: 15 WTA, 6 ITF
- Highest ranking: No. 12 (17 August 1998)

Grand Slam doubles results
- Australian Open: SF (1998)
- French Open: SF (1993)
- Wimbledon: QF (1995)
- US Open: QF (1993, 1995, 1997, 2000)
Medal record
Olympic Games
Bronze medal – third place	2004 Athens	Doubles
Pan American Games
Gold medal – first place	1995 Mar del Plata	Doubles

Patricia Tarabini (born 6 August 1968) is an Argentine tennis coach and former professional player. A doubles specialist, she won 15 titles on the WTA Tour and reached a career-high doubles ranking of world No. 12 on 17 August 1998. She reached world No. 29 in singles in 1988. Tarabini won the mixed-doubles title at the 1996 French Open with fellow Argentine Javier Frana, and won an Olympic bronze medal in women's doubles at the 2004 Summer Olympics with Paola Suárez.

== Career ==
Tarabini turned professional in 1986, after winning the Banana Bowl the previous year. She reached her career-high singles ranking of world No. 29 on 9 May 1988, before becoming more successful as a doubles player.

Among Tarabini's notable doubles partnerships was one with Italian Sandra Cecchini, with whom she reached the semifinals of the 1993 French Open. Her later partnership with Spaniard Conchita Martínez produced quarterfinal appearances at the 1995 Wimbledon Championships and the 1995 US Open, as well as a semifinal at the 1998 Australian Open. The pair qualified for the year-end championships on four occasions.

In mixed doubles, Tarabini and Frana won the 1996 French Open, defeating Nicole Arendt and Luke Jensen 6–2, 6–2 in the final.

Tarabini represented Argentina in Fed Cup competition, playing both singles and doubles, and was a member of the Argentine team that reached the semifinals in 1993 alongside Florencia Labat and Inés Gorrochategui. She competed at the 1992 Barcelona, 1996 Atlanta and 2004 Athens Olympic Games. At Athens, Tarabini and Suárez won the bronze medal in women's doubles, defeating Japan's Shinobu Asagoe and Ai Sugiyama 6–3, 6–3 in the bronze-medal match.

== Coaching career ==
Tarabini began coaching Russian player Anna Kalinskaya shortly before the 2019 Wimbledon Championships. At the 2019 US Open, Kalinskaya credited Tarabini's experience as a former player and her emphasis on enjoying competition with helping her adapt to the professional tour. During their partnership, Kalinskaya reached her first Grand Slam quarterfinal at the 2024 Australian Open and a career-high singles ranking of world No. 11 later that year.

== Grand Slam finals ==
=== Mixed doubles: 1 (title) ===
Result	Year	Championship	Surface	Partner	Opponents	Score
Win	1996	French Open	Clay	(Argentina) Javier Frana	(United States) Luke Jensen (United States) Nicole Arendt	6–2, 6–2

== Olympic finals ==
=== Doubles: 1 (bronze medal) ===
Result	Year	Location	Surface	Partner	Opponents	Score
Bronze	2004	Athens	Hard	(Argentina) Paola Suárez	(Japan) Shinobu Asagoe (Japan) Ai Sugiyama	6–3, 6–3

== WTA Tour finals ==
=== Singles: 3 (runner-ups) ===
Legend
Tier I	0
Tier II	0
Tier III	0
Tier IV & V	0

Result	W/L	Date	Tournament	Surface	Opponent	Score
Loss	0–1	May 1989	Strasbourg, France	Clay	(Czech Republic) Jana Novotná	1–6, 2–6
Loss	0–2	Dec 1989	Guarujá, Brazil	Hard	(Argentina) Federica Haumüller	6–7^{(7–9)}, 4–6
Loss	0–3	Sep 1990	Paris, France	Clay	(Spain) Conchita Martínez	5–7, 3–6

=== Doubles: 31 (15 titles, 16 runner-ups) ===
Legend
Tier I	2
Tier II	2
Tier III	1
Tier IV & V	8

Titles by surface
Hard	1
Clay	13
Grass	0
Carpet	1

Result	No.	Date	Tournament	Surface	Partner	Opponents	Score
Loss	1.	Jul 1987	Båstad, Sweden	Clay	(Italy) Sandra Cecchini	(United States) Penny Barg (Denmark) Tine Scheuer-Larsen	1–6, 2–6
Win	2.	Jul 1989	Arcachon, France	Clay	(Italy) Sandra Cecchini	(Argentina) Mercedes Paz (Netherlands) Brenda Schultz	6–3, 7–6^{(7–5)}
Win	3.	Sep 1989	Athens, Greece	Clay	(Italy) Sandra Cecchini	(Bulgaria) Elena Pampoulova (West Germany) Silke Meier	4–6, 6–4, 6–2
Win	4.	Sep 1989	Paris, France	Clay	(Italy) Sandra Cecchini	(France) Nathalie Herreman (France) Catherine Suire	6–1, 6–1
Win	5.	Dec 1989	Guarujá, Brazil	Hard	(Argentina) Mercedes Paz	(Brazil) Cláudia Chabalgoity (Brazil) Luciana Corsato	6–2, 6–2
Loss	6.	Apr 1990	Barcelona, Spain	Clay	(Socialist Federal Republic of Yugoslavia) Sabrina Goleš	(Argentina) Mercedes Paz (Spain) Arantxa Sánchez Vicario	7–6, 2–6, 1–6
Win	7.	Jul 1990	Estoril, Portugal	Clay	(Italy) Sandra Cecchini	(Netherlands) Carin Bakkum (Netherlands) Nicole Jagerman	1–6, 6–2, 6–3
Loss	8.	Sep 1990	Kitzbühel, Austria	Clay	(Italy) Sandra Cecchini	(Czechoslovakia) Petra Langrová (Czechoslovakia) Radomira Zrubáková	0–6, 4–6
Loss	9.	Jul 1991	Kitzbühel, Austria	Clay	(Italy) Sandra Cecchini	(Argentina) Bettina Fulco (Netherlands) Nicole Jagerman	5–7, 4–6
Win	10.	Sep 1991	Bayonne, France	Carpet (i)	(France) Nathalie Tauziat	(Australia) Rachel McQuillan (France) Catherine Tanvier	6–3, ret.
Win	11.	Sep 1992	Paris, France	Clay	(Italy) Sandra Cecchini	(Australia) Rachel McQuillan (France) Noëlle van Lottum	7–5, 6–1
Win	12.	Jul 1993	Prague, Czech Republic	Clay	(Argentina) Inés Gorrochategui	(Italy) Laura Golarsa (Netherlands) Caroline Vis	6–2, 6–1
Win	13.	Aug 1993	San Marino	Clay	(Italy) Sandra Cecchini	(Argentina) Florencia Labat (Germany) Barbara Rittner	6–3, 6–2
Loss	14.	Oct 1993	Budapest, Hungary	Carpet (i)	(Italy) Sandra Cecchini	(Argentina) Inés Gorrochategui (Netherlands) Caroline Vis	1–6, 3–6
Loss	15.	May 1994	Strasbourg, France	Clay	(Netherlands) Caroline Vis	(United States) Lori McNeil (Australia) Rennae Stubbs	3–6, 6–3, 2–6
Win	16.	Jul 1994	Bad Gastein, Austria	Clay	(Italy) Sandra Cecchini	(France) Alexandra Fusai (Slovakia) Karina Habšudová	7–5, 7–5
Loss	17.	May 1995	Hamburg, Germany	Clay	(Spain) Conchita Martínez	(United States) Gigi Fernández (Switzerland) Martina Hingis	2–6, 3–6
Loss	18.	May 1995	Rome, Italy	Clay	(Spain) Conchita Martínez	(United States) Gigi Fernández (Belarus) Natalia Zvereva	6–3, 6–7^{(3–7)}, 4–6
Loss	19.	May 1997	Rome, Italy	Clay	(Spain) Conchita Martínez	(United States) Nicole Arendt (Netherlands) Manon Bollegraf	2–6, 4–6
Loss	20.	Jul 1997	Stanford, USA	Hard	(Spain) Conchita Martínez	(United States) Lindsay Davenport (Switzerland) Martina Hingis	1–6, 3–6
Win	21.	Apr 1998	Hilton Head, USA	Clay	(Spain) Conchita Martínez	(United States) Lisa Raymond (Australia) Rennae Stubbs	3–6, 6–4, 6–4
Win	22.	Apr 1999	Amelia Island, USA	Clay	(Spain) Conchita Martínez	(United States) Lisa Raymond (Australia) Rennae Stubbs	7–5, 0–6, 6–4
Loss	23.	May 1999	Berlin, Germany	Clay	(Czech Republic) Jana Novotná	(France) Alexandra Fusai (France) Nathalie Tauziat	3–6, 5–7
Win	24.	Sep 1999	Tokyo, Japan	Hard	(Spain) Conchita Martínez	(South Africa) Amanda Coetzer (Australia) Jelena Dokić	6–7^{(5–7)}, 6–4, 6–2
Loss	25.	Apr 2000	Hilton Head, USA	Clay	(Spain) Conchita Martínez	(Spain) Virginia Ruano Pascual (Argentina) Paola Suárez	5–7, 3–6
Win	26.	Apr 2001	Amelia Island, USA	Clay	(Spain) Conchita Martínez	(United States) Martina Navratilova (Spain) Arantxa Sánchez Vicario	6–4, 6–2
Loss	27.	May 2001	Rome, Italy	Clay	(Argentina) Paola Suárez	(Zimbabwe) Cara Black (Russia) Elena Likhovtseva	1–6, 1–6
Win	28.	Jul 2001	Vienna, Austria	Clay	(Argentina) Paola Suárez	(Germany) Vanessa Henke (Czech Republic) Lenka Němečková	6–4, 6–2
Loss	29.	Sep 2001	Bahia, Brazil	Hard	(United States) Nicole Arendt	(South Africa) Amanda Coetzer (United States) Lori McNeil	7–6^{(10–8)}, 2–6, 4–6
Loss	30.	May 2002	Rome, Italy	Clay	(Spain) Conchita Martínez	(Spain) Virginia Ruano Pascual (Argentina) Paola Suárez	3–6, 4–6
Loss	31.	May 2004	Warsaw, Poland	Clay	(Argentina) Gisela Dulko	(Italy) Silvia Farina Elia (Italy) Francesca Schiavone	6–3, 2–6, 1–6

== ITF Circuit finals ==
=== Singles (2–1) ===
$50,000 tournaments
$25,000 tournaments
$10,000 tournaments

Result	No.	Date	Tournament	Surface	Opponent	Score
Loss	1.	22 April 1985	ITF Monviso, Italy	Clay	(Italy) Laura Golarsa	4–6, 3–6
Win	1.	6 April 1986	ITF Bari, Italy	Clay	(Czechoslovakia) Olga Votavová	6–0, 6–4
Win	2.	21 April 1986	ITF Taranto, Italy	Clay	(West Germany) Wiltrud Probst	6–2, 6–1

=== Doubles (6–5) ===
Result	No.	Date	Tournament	Surface	Partner	Opponents	Score
Win	1.	17 March 1985	ITF Porto Alegre, Brazil	Clay	(Argentina) Mariana Pérez Roldán	(United Kingdom) Rina Einy (United Kingdom) Lorrayne Gracie	7–6^{(0)}, 3–6, 6–4
Win	2.	1 April 1985	ITF Buenos Aires, Argentina	Clay	(Argentina) Mariana Pérez Roldán	(Argentina) Gabriela Mosca (Argentina) Andrea Tiezzi	7–6, 6–4
Loss	1.	22 April 1985	ITF Monviso, Italy	Clay	(Argentina) Mariana Pérez Roldán	(Italy) Patrizia Murgo (Italy) Barbara Romanò	6–7, 5–7
Win	3.	16 June 1985	ITF Amiens, France	Clay	(Argentina) Mariana Pérez Roldán	(United States) Cammy MacGregor (United States) Cynthia MacGregor	6–3, 6–4
Loss	2.	15 July 1985	ITF Subiaco, Italy	Clay	(Argentina) Mariana Pérez Roldán	(Italy) Patrizia Murgo (Italy) Barbara Romanò	2–6, 1–6
Loss	3.	22 July 1985	ITF Sezze, Italy	Clay	(Argentina) Mariana Pérez Roldán	(Italy) Patrizia Murgo (Italy) Barbara Romanò	6–3, 3–6, 2–6
Loss	4.	5 March 1989	ITF Miami, United States	Hard	(Argentina) Gabriela Mosca	(United States) Kathy Foxworth (United States) Tammy Whittington	6–7, 6–7
Loss	5.	11 July 1994	ITF Darmstadt, Germany	Clay	(Argentina) Bettina Fulco	(South Korea) Park Sung-hee (South Korea) Choi Ju-yeon	4–6, 3–6
Win	4.	27 September 1998	ITF Tucuman, Argentina	Clay	(Argentina) Mercedes Paz	(Argentina) Luciana Masante (Argentina) Laura Montalvo	5–7, 6–4, 7–6
Win	5.	8 July 2001	ITF Orbetello, Italy	Clay	(Argentina) María Emilia Salerni	(Bulgaria) Lubomira Bacheva (Belgium) Laurence Courtois	7–6^{(5)}, 3–6, 6–1
Win	6.	1 February 2004	ITF Waikoloa, United States	Hard	(Argentina) Gisela Dulko	(United States) Amanda Augustus (South Africa) Natalie Grandin	1–6, 6–3, 6–3

== Career statistics ==
=== Singles performance timeline ===
Key
W	F	SF	QF	#R	RR	Q#	DNQ	A	NH

(W) winner; (F) finalist; (SF) semifinalist; (QF) quarterfinalist; (#R) rounds 4, 3, 2, 1; (RR) round-robin stage; (Q#) qualification round; (DNQ) did not qualify; (A) absent; (NH) not held; (SR) strike rate (events won / competed); (W–L) win–loss record.

Tournament	1987	1988	1989	1990	1991	1992	1993	1994	1995
Australian Open	A	A	A	A	2R	A	A	2R	2R
French Open	A	A	A	3R	A	A	A	A	A
Wimbledon	A	A	A	A	A	A	A	2R	A
US Open	3R	3R	A	A	A	A	A	A	A

Sporting positions
Preceded by (United States) Mary Joe Fernandez	Orange Bowl Girls' Singles Champion; Category: 18 and under 1986	Succeeded by (Soviet Union) Natalia Zvereva
