= Nathalie Herreman =

French tennis player

- Country (sports): France
- Born: 28 March 1966 (age 58); Sainte-Adresse, France
- Height: 1.64 m (5 ft 4 1/2 in)
- Turned pro: 1982
- Retired: 1996
- Plays: Left-handed
- Prize money: $532,036

Singles
- Career record: 249–235
- Career titles: 1 WTA, 1 ITF
- Highest ranking: No. 42 (21 December 1986)

Grand Slam singles results
- Australian Open: 2R (1989)
- French Open: 3R (1983, 1987, 1990)
- Wimbledon: 4R (1990)
- US Open: 3R (1988, 1991)

Doubles
- Career record: 2 WTA, 4 ITF
- Career titles: 108–135
- Highest ranking: No. 35 (10 October 1988)

Grand Slam doubles results
- Australian Open: 2R (1989)
- French Open: QF (1988,
- Wimbledon: 2R (1990)
- US Open: 2R (1988, 1991)

Nathalie Herreman (born 28 March 1966) is a former professional tennis player.

She played on the WTA Tour from 1983 to 1995 and won a singles title in 1986 in Perugia and reached the fourth round at Wimbledon in 1990.

== WTA career finals ==
=== Singles 1 (1–0) ===
Legend
Grand Slam	0
Tier I	0
Tier II	0
Tier III	0
Tier IV & V	0

Result	W/L	Date	Tournament	Surface	Opponent	Score
Win	1–0	Jul 1986	Perugia, Italy	Clay	(Switzerland) Csilla Bartos-Cserepy	6–2, 6–4

=== Doubles 6 (2–4) ===
Legend
Grand Slam	0
Tier I	0
Tier II	0
Tier III	0
Tier IV & V	1

Titles by surface
Hard	0
Clay	1
Grass	0
Carpet	1

Result	W/L	Date	Tournament	Surface	Partner	Opponents	Score
Win	1–0	Nov 1987	Zürich, Switzerland	Carpet (i)	(France) Pascale Paradis	(Czechoslovakia) Jana Novotná (France) Catherine Suire	6–3, 2–6, 6–3
Win	2–0	Jul 1988	Aix-en-Provence, France	Clay	(France) Catherine Tanvier	(Italy) Sandra Cecchini (Spain) Arantxa Sánchez Vicario	6–4, 7–5
Loss	2–1	Sep 1988	Paris, France	Clay	(Australia) Louise Field	(France) Alexia Dechaume (France) Emmanuelle Derly	0–6, 2–6
Loss	2–2	Sep 1989	Paris, France	Clay	(France) Catherine Suire	(Italy) Sandra Cecchini (Argentina) Patricia Tarabini	1–6, 1–6
Loss	2–3	Oct 1989	Moscow, USSR	Carpet (i)	(France) Catherine Suire	(Soviet Union) Larisa Savchenko (Soviet Union) Natalia Zvereva	3–6, 4–6
Loss	2–4	Sep 1990	Paris, France	Carpet	(France) Alexia Dechaume	(Australia) Kristin Godridge (Australia) Kirrily Sharpe	6–4, 3–6, 1–6

== ITF finals ==
=== Singles (1–3) ===
Legend
$25,000 tournaments
$10,000 tournaments

Result	No.	Date	Tournament	Surface	Opponent	Score
Loss	1.	11 January 1988	Moulins, France	Clay	(France) Karine Quentrec	1–6, 2–6
Win	1.	4 December 1989	Le Havre, France	Clay	(Poland) Iwona Kuczyńska	6–4, 7–6^{(7–5)}
Loss	2.	3 December 1990	Le Havre, France	Clay	(France) Nathalie Housset	6–4, 6–7, 6–7
Loss	3.	27 June 1994	Cáceres, Spain	Clay	(Spain) María Sánchez Lorenzo	4–6, 4–6

=== Doubles (4–0) ===
Result	No.	Date	Tournament	Surface	Partner	Opponents	Score
Win	1.	11 January 1988	Moulins, France	Clay	(France) Karine Quentrec	(United Kingdom) Caroline Billingham (United Kingdom) Anne Simpkin	6–3, 6–3
Win	2.	4 December 1989	Le Havre, France	Clay	(France) Catherine Suire	(West Germany) Stefanie Rehmke (Austria) Mirijam Schweda	6–2, 6–0
Win	3.	2 December 1991	Le Havre, France	Clay	(Russia) Eugenia Maniokova	(Netherlands) Gaby Coorengel (Netherlands) Amy van Buuren	6–3, 6–4
Win	4.	6 May 1996	Le Touquet, France	Clay	(France) Karine Quentrec	(Belgium) Patty Van Acker (Russia) Anna Linkova	6–1, 6–1
