= 1987 WTA Argentine Open – Singles =

Singles
- 1987 WTA Argentine Open
- 1986 Champion: (Argentina) Gabriela Sabatini

Final
- Champion: (Argentina) Gabriela Sabatini
- Runner-up: (Canada) Isabel Cueto
- Score: 6–0, 6–2

Details
- Draw: 56
- Seeds: 16

Events
| Singles | Doubles |
| ← 1986 · | WTA Argentine Open | · 1988 → |

Gabriela Sabatini was the defending champion and won in the final 6–0, 6–2 against Isabel Cueto.

== Seeds ==
A champion seed is indicated in bold text while text in italics indicates the round in which that seed was eliminated. The top eight seeds received a bye to the second round.

1. (Argentina) **Gabriela Sabatini (champion)**
2. (West Germany) Isabel Cueto (final)
3. (Argentina) Bettina Fulco (semifinals)
4. (Argentina) Patricia Tarabini (quarterfinals)
5. (Switzerland) Christiane Jolissaint (second round)
6. (Italy) Laura Garrone (quarterfinals)
7. (Argentina) Mercedes Paz (quarterfinals)
8. (Austria) Barbara Paulus (semifinals)
9. (United States) Vicki Nelson-Dunbar (third round)
10. (Argentina) Adriana Villagrán (first round)
11. (Brazil) Gisele Miró (quarterfinals)
12. (Peru) Pilar Vásquez (second round)
13. (United States) Katrina Adams (first round)
14. (United States) Lea Antonoplis (second round)
15. n/a
16. n/a

== Draw ==
=== Key ===
- Q = Qualifier
- WC = Wild card
- LL = Lucky loser
- Alt = Alternate
- SE = Special exempt
- PR = Protected ranking
- ITF = ITF entry
- JE = Junior exempt
- w/o = Walkover
- r = Retired
- d = Defaulted
- SR = Special ranking

=== Finals ===
Semifinals
1 | (Argentina) **Gabriela Sabatini** | **6** | **6**
3 | (Argentina) Bettina Fulco | 0 | 2
8 | (Austria) Barbara Paulus | 2 | **6** | 1
2 | (West Germany) **Isabel Cueto** | **6** | 3 | **6**

Final
1 | (Argentina) **Gabriela Sabatini** | **6** | **6**
2 | (West Germany) Isabel Cueto | 0 | 3

=== Top half ===
==== Section 1 ====
First round
(Canada) **J Hetherington** | **6** | 4 | **6**
(Switzerland) C Cohen | 2 | **6** | 1
(West Germany) **A Betzner** | **6** | **6**
(United Kingdom) L Gould | 3 | 0
(France) I Crudo | 4 | **6** | 2
14 | (United States) **L Antonoplis** | **6** | 2 | **6**
(France) P Etchemendy | 1 | 6
(United States) **L Spadea** | **6** | **7**
(West Germany) **K Düll** | 4 | **7** | **6**
(United States) S Norris | **6** | 6 | 2
(Austria) B Reinstadler | 5 | 3
(Brazil) **L Tella** | **7** | **6**

Second round
1 | (Argentina) **G Sabatini** | **6** | **6**
(Canada) J Hetherington | 4 | 2
(West Germany) **A Betzner** | **7** | **6**
14 | (United States) L Antonoplis | 6 | 2
(United States) **L Spadea** | 5 | **6** | **6**
(West Germany) K Düll | **7** | 4 | 4
(Brazil) L Tella | 4 | 0
7 | (Argentina) **M Paz** | **6** | **6**

Third round
1 | (Argentina) **G Sabatini** | **6** | **6**
(West Germany) A Betzner | 1 | 2
(United States) L Spadea | 2 | 2
7 | (Argentina) **M Paz** | **6** | **6**

Quarterfinals
1 | (Argentina) **G Sabatini** | **7** | **6**
7 | (Argentina) M Paz | 5 | 2

==== Section 2 ====
First round
(Netherlands) S Schilder | **6** | 1 | 0
(Brazil) **L Corsato** | 2 | **6** | **6**
(Netherlands) C Bakkum | 3 | 3
(United Kingdom) **L Pennington** | **6** | **6**
(United States) L Bartlett | 1 | 5
9 | (United States) **V Nelson-Dunbar** | **6** | **7**
12 | (Brazil) **G Miró** | **6** | **6**
(United Kingdom) A Grunfeld | 1 | 1
(Spain) A Radics | 5 | 1
(Argentina) **N Marcucci** | **7** | **6**
(United States) **E Galphin** | **6** | **6**
(United States) C Jones | 0 | 0

Second round
3 | (Argentina) **B Fulco** | **6** | **6**
(Brazil) L Corsato | 3 | 0
(United Kingdom) L Pennington | 0 | 2
9 | (United States) **V Nelson-Dunbar** | **6** | **6**
12 | (Brazil) **G Miró** | 3 | **6** | **6**
(Argentina) N Marcucci | **6** | 3 | 3
(United States) **E Galphin** | **6** | **6**
5 | (Switzerland) C Jolissaint | 4 | 4

Third round
3 | (Argentina) **B Fulco** | **6** | **6**
9 | (United States) V Nelson-Dunbar | 0 | 4
12 | (Brazil) **G Miró** | **6** | **6**
(United States) E Galphin | 1 | 0

Quarterfinals
3 | (Argentina) **B Fulco** | 5 | **6** | **6**
12 | (Brazil) G Miró | **7** | 2 | 2

=== Bottom half ===
==== Section 3 ====
First round
(United States) J Golder | 2 | **6** | 3
(Argentina) **A Tiezzi** | **6** | 2 | **6**
(United States) **C Christian** | **6** | **6**
(Austria) K Oberleitner | 2 | 3
(West Germany) **A Gerber** | 3 | **6** | **6**
(Argentina) G Mosca | **6** | 0 | 1
12 | (Peru) **P Vásquez** | **6** | **6**
(Austria) B Diesner | 3 | 3
(Italy) S La Fratta | 5 | 1
(Greece) **O Tsarbopoulou** | **7** | **6**
(Switzerland) **M Strebel** | **6** | **6**
(United States) E Raponi-Longo | 1 | 1

Second round
8 | (Austria) **B Paulus** | **6** | **6**
(Argentina) A Tiezzi | 4 | 3
(United States) **C Christian** | **6** | **6**
(West Germany) A Gerber | 1 | 4
12 | (Peru) P Vásquez | 3 | **6** | 2
(Greece) **O Tsarbopoulou** | **6** | 1 | **6**
(Switzerland) M Strebel | 1 | 5
4 | (Argentina) **P Tarabini** | **6** | **7**

Third round
8 | (Austria) **B Paulus** | **6** | **6**
(United States) C Christian | 1 | 2
(Greece) O Tsarbopoulou | 5 | **7** | 0
4 | (Argentina) **P Tarabini** | **7** | 6 | **6**

Quarterfinals
8 | (Austria) **B Paulus** | **7** | **6**
4 | (Argentina) P Tarabini | 5 | 4

==== Section 4 ====
First round
(France) M-C Damas | 3 | r
(Austria) **P Ritter** | **6**
(Italy) **L Lapi** | **6** | **6**
(United States) M Brown | 1 | 1
(Brazil) **A Vieira** | **6** | **6**
13 | (United States) K Adams | 3 | 4
10 | (Argentina) A Villagrán | 2 | 0
(Socialist Federal Republic of Yugoslavia) **K Škulj** | **6** | **6**
(Netherlands) **Y der Kinderen** | **6** | **6**
(Brazil) G Faria | 3 | 2
(West Germany) **S Hack** | **6** | **6**
(United States) A Frazier | 3 | 3

Second round
6 | (Italy) **L Garrone** | **6** | **6**
(Austria) P Ritter | 1 | 4
(Italy) **L Lapi** | **6** | **6**
(Brazil) A Vieira | 1 | 0
(Socialist Federal Republic of Yugoslavia) K Škulj | 0 | 4
(Netherlands) **Y der Kinderen** | **6** | **6**
(West Germany) S Hack | 6 | 5
2 | (West Germany) **I Cueto** | **7** | **7**

Third round
6 | (Italy) **L Garrone** | **6** | **6**
(Italy) L Lapi | 1 | 2
(Netherlands) Y der Kinderen | 6 | **6** | 1
2 | (West Germany) **I Cueto** | **7** | 2 | **6**

Quarterfinals
6 | (Italy) L Garrone | 3 | 3
2 | (West Germany) **I Cueto** | **6** | **6**
