= 1988 Rainha Cup – Doubles =

Doubles
- 1988 Rainha Cup
- 1987 Champions: (United States) Katrina Adams (United States) Cheryl Jones

Final
- Champions: (Argentina) Bettina Fulco (Argentina) Mercedes Paz
- Runners-up: (Netherlands) Carin Bakkum (Netherlands) Simone Schilder
- Score: 6–3, 6–4

Details
- Draw: 16
- Seeds: 4

Events
Singles	Doubles
- Brasil Open

Katrina Adams and Cheryl Jones were the defending champions but did not compete that year.

Bettina Fulco and Mercedes Paz won in the final 6–3, 6–4 against Carin Bakkum and Simone Schilder.

== Seeds ==
Champion seeds are indicated in bold text while text in italics indicates the round in which those seeds were eliminated.

1. (Argentina) **Bettina Fulco** / (Argentina) **Mercedes Paz (champions)**
2. (Netherlands) Carin Bakkum / (Netherlands) Simone Schilder (final)
3. (Argentina) Adriana Villagrán / (United States) Emilse Raponi-Longo (first round)
4. (Brazil) Gisele Miró / (Argentina) Gabriela Mosca (semifinals)

== Draw ==
Key

- Q = Qualifier
- WC = Wild card
- LL = Lucky loser
- Alt = Alternate
- ITF = ITF entry
- PR = Protected ranking
- SR = Special ranking
- SE = Special exempt
- JE = Junior exempt
- JR = Junior Accelerator Programme entrant
- CO = College Accelerator Programme entrant
- NG = Next Gen Accelerator Program entrant
- w/o = Walkover
- r = Retired
- d = Defaulted

First round
1	(Argentina) **B Fulco** (Argentina) **M Paz**	**6**	**6**
(United States) L Spadea (Finland) A Aallonen	4	0
(United States) J Pisarcik (Peru) K Strohmeier	4	2
(Switzerland) **M Strebel** (Argentina) **A Tiezzi**	**6**	**6**
3	(Argentina) A Villagrán (United States) E Raponi-Longo	**6**	3	2
(Poland) **R Baranski** (Chile) **M Miranda**	3	**6**	**6**
(Peru) **P Collantes** (United States) **M Norwood**	4	**6**	**6**
(Argentina) N Marcucci (Spain) A Radics	**6**	1	3
(Spain) J Souto (Spain) R Bielsa	2	**6**	3
(Switzerland) **C Cohen** (Peru) **P Vásquez**	**6**	1	**6**
(Brazil) L Corsato (Uruguay) P Miller	5	5
4	(Brazil) **G Miró** (Argentina) **G Mosca**	**7**	**7**
(Brazil) **C Chabalgoity** (Brazil) **L Della Casa**	**6**	**6**
(Brazil) G Faria (Mexico) L Riefkohl	2	1
(Brazil) L Tella (Brazil) A Vieira	1	5
2	(Netherlands) **C Bakkum** (Netherlands) **S Schilder**	**6**	**7**

Quarterfinals
1	(Argentina) **B Fulco** (Argentina) **M Paz**	**6**	**6**
(Switzerland) M Strebel (Argentina) A Tiezzi	1	3
(Poland) **R Baranski** (Chile) **M Miranda**	3	**6**	**6**
(Peru) P Collantes (United States) M Norwood	**6**	3	4
(Switzerland) C Cohen (Peru) P Vásquez	**7**	2	2
4	(Brazil) **G Miró** (Argentina) **G Mosca**	6	**6**	**6**
(Brazil) C Chabalgoity (Brazil) L Della Casa	3	1
2	(Netherlands) **C Bakkum** (Netherlands) **S Schilder**	**6**	**6**

Semifinals
1	(Argentina) **B Fulco** (Argentina) **M Paz**	**6**	**6**
(Poland) R Baranski (Chile) M Miranda	4	2
4	(Brazil) G Miró (Argentina) G Mosca	3	**6**	4
2	(Netherlands) **C Bakkum** (Netherlands) **S Schilder**	**6**	4	**6**

Final
1	(Argentina) **Bettina Fulco** (Argentina) **Mercedes Paz**	**6**	**6**
2	(Netherlands) Carin Bakkum (Netherlands) Simone Schilder	3	4
