= 1987 WTA Argentine Open – Doubles =

Doubles
- 1987 WTA Argentine Open
- 1986 Champions: (United States) Lori McNeil (Argentina) Mercedes Paz

Final
- Champions: (Argentina) Mercedes Paz (Argentina) Gabriela Sabatini
- Runners-up: (Canada) Jill Hetherington (Switzerland) Christiane Jolissaint
- Score: 6–2, 6–2

Events
Singles	Doubles
← 1986 ·	WTA Argentine Open	· 1988 →

Lori McNeil and Mercedes Paz were the defending champions but only Paz competed that year with Gabriela Sabatini.

Paz and Sabatini won in the final 6–2, 6–2 against Jill Hetherington and Christiane Jolissaint.

== Seeds ==
Champion seeds are indicated in bold text while text in italics indicates the round in which those seeds were eliminated. All eight seeded teams received byes into the second round.

1. (Argentina) **Mercedes Paz** / (Argentina) **Gabriela Sabatini (champions)**
2. (West Germany) Andrea Betzner / (West Germany) Isabel Cueto (quarterfinals)
3. (United States) Emilse Raponi-Longo / (Argentina) Patricia Tarabini (quarterfinals)
4. (Argentina) Gabriela Mosca / (Argentina) Adriana Villagrán (second round)
5. (Canada) Jill Hetherington / (Switzerland) Christiane Jolissaint (final)
6. (United States) Lea Antonoplis / (Argentina) Andrea Tiezzi (semifinals)
7. (Netherlands) Carin Bakkum / (Netherlands) Simone Schilder (semifinals)
8. (Argentina) Bettina Fulco / (Brazil) Gisele Miró (quarterfinals)

== Draw ==
=== Key ===
- Q = Qualifier
- WC = Wild card
- LL = Lucky loser
- Alt = Alternate
- SE = Special exempt
- PR = Protected ranking
- ITF = ITF entry
- JE = Junior exempt
- w/o = Walkover
- r = Retired
- d = Defaulted
- SR = Special ranking

=== Final ===
Final

1
- (Argentina) **Mercedes Paz**
- (Argentina) **Gabriela Sabatini**
**6**
**6**

5
- (Canada) Jill Hetherington
- (Switzerland) Christiane Jolissaint
2
2

=== Top half ===
First round

Second round

Quarterfinals

Semifinals

1
- (Argentina) **M Paz**
- (Argentina) **G Sabatini**
**6**
4
**6**

- (West Germany) A Gerber
- (West Germany) S Hack
3
4

- (United States) L Bartlett
- (United States) C Christian
2
**6**
1

- (United States) **L Bartlett**
- (United States) **C Christian**
**6**
**6**

1
- (Argentina) **M Paz**
- (Argentina) **G Sabatini**
**6**
**7**

- (Brazil) G Faria
- (Peru) K Strohmeier
4
**6**
4

8
- (Argentina) B Fulco
- (Brazil) G Miró
3
5

- (Netherlands) **Y der Kinderen**
- (Argentina) **N Marcucci**
**6**
1
**6**

- (Netherlands) Y der Kinderen
- (Argentina) N Marcucci
2
3

8
- (Argentina) **B Fulco**
- (Brazil) **G Miró**
**6**
**6**

1
- (Argentina) **M Paz**
- (Argentina) **G Sabatini**
**6**
**6**

6
- (United States) L Antonoplis
- (Argentina) A Tiezzi
2
2

3
- (United States) E Raponi-Longo
- (Argentina) P Tarabini
6
**6**
4

- (Austria) B Diesner
- (Austria) K Oberleitner
3
4

- (United States) **K Adams**
- (United States) **C Jones**
**7**
4
**6**

- (United States) **K Adams**
- (United States) **C Jones**
**6**
**6**

- (United States) K Adams
- (United States) C Jones
**6**
3
3

- (United States) V Nelson-Dunbar
- (Peru) P Vásquez
5
5

6
- (United States) **L Antonoplis**
- (Argentina) **A Tiezzi**
4
**6**
**6**

- (Switzerland) **C Cohen**
- (Switzerland) **M Strebel**
**7**
**7**

- (Switzerland) C Cohen
- (Switzerland) M Strebel
6
6

6
- (United States) **L Antonoplis**
- (Argentina) **A Tiezzi**
**7**
**7**

=== Bottom half ===
First round

Second round

Quarterfinals

Semifinals

5
- (Canada) **J Hetherington**
- (Switzerland) **C Jolissaint**
**6**
6
**6**

- (United States) J Golder
- (United States) S Norris
4
**6**
1

- (Italy) L Garrone
- (Italy) L Lapi
3
**7**
3

- (Italy) **L Garrone**
- (Italy) **L Lapi**
**6**
4
**6**

5
- (Canada) **J Hetherington**
- (Switzerland) **C Jolissaint**
**6**
**7**

- (Argentina) **F Labat**
- (Argentina) **C Tessi**
**6**
**6**

- (Argentina) F Labat
- (Argentina) C Tessi
0
5

- (France) I Crudo
- (United States) E Galphin
1
1

- (Argentina) **F Labat**
- (Argentina) **C Tessi**
**6**
**6**

4
- (Argentina) G Mosca
- (Argentina) A Villagrán
0
3

5
- (Canada) **J Hetherington**
- (Switzerland) **C Jolissaint**
**6**
**6**

7
- (Netherlands) C Bakkum
- (Netherlands) S Schilder
3
1

7
- (Netherlands) **C Bakkum**
- (Netherlands) **S Schilder**
**6**
**6**

- (Brazil) L Corsato
- (Greece) O Tsarbopoulou
**6**
4
2

(Spain) A Radics
(Socialist Federal Republic of Yugoslavia) K Škulj
4
3

(Spain) **A Radics**
(Socialist Federal Republic of Yugoslavia) **K Škulj**
4
**6**
**6**

7
- (Netherlands) **C Bakkum**
- (Netherlands) **S Schilder**
**6**
**6**

- (United Kingdom) A Grunfeld
- (United Kingdom) K Rickett
**6**
2
5

2
- (West Germany) A Betzner
- (West Germany) I Cueto
3
1

- (Brazil) **L Tella**
- (Brazil) **A Vieira**
4
**6**
**7**

- (Brazil) L Tella
- (Brazil) A Vieira

2
- (West Germany) **A Betzner**
- (West Germany) **I Cueto**
**w/o**
