= 1987 Brazilian Open – Doubles =

Doubles
- 1987 Brazilian Open
- 1986 Champions: (Brazil) Neige Dias (Brazil) Patricia Medrado

Final
- Champions: (United States) Katrina Adams (United States) Cheryl Jones
- Runners-up: (Canada) Jill Hetherington (Argentina) Mercedes Paz
- Score: 6–4, 4–6, 6–4

Details
- Draw: 16
- Seeds: 4

Events
Singles	Doubles
← 1986 ·	Brasil Open	· 1988 →

Neige Dias and Patricia Medrado were the defending champions but they competed with different partners that year, Dias with Bettina Fulco and Medrado with Cláudia Monteiro.

Dias and Fulco lost in the quarterfinals to Amy Frazier and Luanne Spadea, as did Medrado and Monteiro to Jill Hetherington and Mercedes Paz.

Katrina Adams and Cheryl Jones won in the final 6–4, 4–6, 6–4 against Hetherington and Paz.

== Seeds ==
Champion seeds are indicated in bold text while text in italics indicates the round in which those seeds were eliminated.

1. (West Germany) Andrea Betzner / (West Germany) Isabel Cueto (quarterfinals)
2. (Canada) Jill Hetherington / (Argentina) Mercedes Paz (final)
3. (United States) Lea Antonoplis / (United States) Emilse Raponi-Longo (first round)
4. (Brazil) Neige Dias / (Argentina) Bettina Fulco (quarterfinals)

== Draw ==
=== Key ===
- Q = Qualifier
- WC = Wild card
- LL = Lucky loser
- Alt = Alternate
- SE = Special exempt
- PR = Protected ranking
- ITF = ITF entry
- JE = Junior exempt
- w/o = Walkover
- r = Retired
- d = Defaulted
- SR = Special ranking

First round

Quarterfinals

Semifinals

Final

1
- (West Germany) **A Betzner**
- (West Germany) **I Cueto**
**6**
**6**

- (United States) V Nelson-Dunbar
- (Peru) P Vásquez
3
4

1
- (West Germany) A Betzner
- (West Germany) I Cueto
3
**6**
4

- (Italy) S La Fratta
- (Italy) L Lapi
3
5

- (Brazil) **L Corsato**
- (Brazil) **G Faria**
**6**
2
**6**

- (Brazil) **L Corsato**
- (Brazil) **G Faria**
**6**
**7**

- (Brazil) L Corsato
- (Brazil) G Faria
1
1

3
- (United States) L Antonoplis
- (United States) E Raponi-Longo
4
3

- (United States) **K Adams**
- (United States) **C Jones**
**6**
**6**

- (United States) **K Adams**
- (United States) **C Jones**
**6**
**6**

- (United States) **K Adams**
- (United States) **C Jones**
**7**
2
**6**

- (Italy) L Garrone
- (Switzerland) C Jolissaint
**7**
1
1

- (Netherlands) C Bakkum
- (Argentina) A Villagrán
6
**6**
3

- (Netherlands) **C Bakkum**
- (Argentina) **A Villagrán**
5
**6**
**6**

- (United States) **Katrina Adams**
- (United States) **Cheryl Jones**
**6**
4
**6**

- (United States) J Golder
- (United States) S Norris
1
4

2
- (Canada) Jill Hetherington
- (Argentina) Mercedes Paz
4
**6**
4

- (United States) **A Frazier**
- (United States) **L Spadea**
**6**
**6**

- (United States) **A Frazier**
- (United States) **L Spadea**
**6**
**6**

- (United States) L Bartlett
- (United States) C Christian
3
2

4
- (Brazil) N Dias
- (Argentina) B Fulco
1
1

4
- (Brazil) **N Dias**
- (Argentina) **B Fulco**
**6**
**6**

- (United States) A Frazier
- (United States) L Spadea
0
3

- (Switzerland) C Cohen
- (Spain) A Radics
5
0

2
- (Canada) **J Hetherington**
- (Argentina) **M Paz**
**6**
**6**

- (Brazil) **P Medrado**
- (Brazil) **C Monteiro**
**7**
**6**

- (Brazil) P Medrado
- (Brazil) C Monteiro
1
6

- (United States) M Brown
- (France) M-C Damas
2
2

2
- (Canada) **J Hetherington**
- (Argentina) **M Paz**
**6**
**7**

2
- (Canada) **J Hetherington**
- (Argentina) **M Paz**
**6**
**6**
