= 1988 Rainha Cup – Singles =

Singles
- 1988 Rainha Cup
- 1987 Champion: (Brazil) Neige Dias

Final
- Champion: (Argentina) Mercedes Paz
- Runner-up: (Canada) Rene Simpson
- Score: 7–5, 6–2

Details
- Draw: 32 (4Q)
- Seeds: 8

Events
Singles	Doubles
- Brasil Open

Neige Dias was the defending champion but lost in the quarterfinals to Andrea Vieira.

Mercedes Paz won in the final 7–5, 6–2 against qualifier Rene Simpson.

== Seeds ==
A champion seed is indicated in bold text while text in italics indicates the round in which that seed was eliminated.

1. (Argentina) Bettina Fulco (quarterfinals)
2. (Brazil) Neige Dias (quarterfinals)
3. (Argentina) **Mercedes Paz (champion)**
4. (Argentina) Adriana Villagrán (first round)
5. (Switzerland) Céline Cohen (first round)
6. (Brazil) Patricia Medrado (second round)
7. (West Germany) Veronika Martinek (first round)
8. (Brazil) Gisele Miró (quarterfinals)

== Draw ==
Key

- Q = Qualifier
- WC = Wild card
- LL = Lucky loser
- Alt = Alternate
- ITF = ITF entry
- PR = Protected ranking
- SR = Special ranking
- SE = Special exempt
- JE = Junior exempt
- JR = Junior Accelerator Programme entrant
- CO = College Accelerator Programme entrant
- NG = Next Gen Accelerator Program entrant
- w/o = Walkover
- r = Retired
- d = Defaulted

First round
1	(Argentina) **B Fulco**	**6**	**6**
(United States) L Spadea	1	2
Q	(United States) **A Creek**	**6**	**6**
(Brazil) L Della Casa	1	3
(Austria) J Wiesner	5	3
(Brazil) **L Corsato**	**7**	**6**
(Peru) **P Vásquez**	**6**	**6**
7	(West Germany) V Martinek	3	4
3	(Argentina) **M Paz**	**6**	**6**
(Netherlands) N Rooimans	4	3
(Austria) K Oberleitner	4	3
(Netherlands) **S Schilder**	**6**	**6**
(United States) **D Faber**	**6**	**6**
(Argentina) A Tiezzi	2	2
(United States) E Raponi-Longo	**6**	4	6
6	(Brazil) **P Medrado**	4	**6**	**7**
8	(Brazil) **G Miró**	**6**	**6**
(Netherlands) C Bakkum	3	0
(Argentina) **N Marcucci**	2	**6**	**6**
(United Kingdom) L Pennington	**6**	3	2
Q	(Poland) **R Baranski**	2	**6**	**6**
(Brazil) L Tella	**6**	3	2
Q	(Canada) **R Simpson**	**6**	**6**
4	(Argentina) A Villagrán	4	1
5	(Switzerland) C Cohen	4	2
(Argentina) **G Mosca**	**6**	**6**
(Brazil) **A Vieira**	6	**6**	**6**
(Peru) K Strohmeier	**7**	3	4
(Netherlands) **M Rooimans**	**7**	5	**6**
Q	(Spain) J Souto	6	**7**	3
(Brazil) C Chabalgoity	2	**6**	4
2	(Brazil) **N Dias**	**6**	2	**6**

Second round
1	(Argentina) **B Fulco**	**6**	**7**
Q	(United States) A Creek	1	5
(Brazil) L Corsato	1	**6**	2
(Peru) **P Vásquez**	**6**	4	**6**
3	(Argentina) **M Paz**	**6**	**7**
(Netherlands) S Schilder	3	6
(United States) **D Faber**	**7**	**6**
6	(Brazil) P Medrado	6	3
8	(Brazil) **G Miró**	6	**6**	**7**
(Argentina) N Marcucci	**7**	2	5
Q	(Poland) R Baranski	4	4
Q	(Canada) **R Simpson**	**6**	**6**
(Argentina) G Mosca	2	2
(Brazil) **A Vieira**	**6**	**6**
(Netherlands) M Rooimans	4	**7**	0
2	(Brazil) **N Dias**	**6**	5	**6**

Quarterfinals
1	(Argentina) B Fulco	3	2
(Peru) **P Vásquez**	**6**	**6**
3	(Argentina) **M Paz**	**6**	**6**
(United States) D Faber	3	3
8	(Brazil) G Miró	5	3
Q	(Canada) **R Simpson**	**7**	**6**
(Brazil) **A Vieira**	**6**	**6**
2	(Brazil) N Dias	2	3

Semifinals
(Peru) P Vásquez	2	2
3	(Argentina) **M Paz**	**6**	**6**
Q	(Canada) **R Simpson**	**6**	**6**
(Brazil) A Vieira	2	2

Final
3	(Argentina) **Mercedes Paz**	**7**	**6**
Q	(Canada) Rene Simpson	5	2
