= 1988 Belgian Open – Doubles =

Doubles
- 1988 Belgian Open
- 1987 Champions: (West Germany) Bettina Bunge (Bulgaria) Katerina Maleeva

Final
- Champions: (Argentina) Mercedes Paz (Denmark) Tine Scheuer-Larsen
- Runners-up: (Bulgaria) Katerina Maleeva (Italy) Raffaella Reggi
- Score: 7–6, 6–1

Events
Singles	Doubles
← 1987 ·	Belgian Open	· 1989 →

Bettina Bunge and Katerina Maleeva were the defending champions but only Maleeva competed that year with Raffaella Reggi.

Maleeva and Reggi lost in the final 7–6, 6–1 against Mercedes Paz and Tine Scheuer-Larsen.

== Seeds ==
Champion seeds are indicated in bold text while text in italics indicates the round in which those seeds were eliminated.

1. (United States) Zina Garrison / (United States) Kathleen Horvath (quarterfinals)
2. (Argentina) **Mercedes Paz** / (Denmark) **Tine Scheuer-Larsen (champions)**
3. (Bulgaria) Katerina Maleeva / (Italy) Raffaella Reggi (final)
4. (Spain) Arantxa Sánchez / (Belgium) Sandra Wasserman (semifinals)

== Draw ==
=== Key ===
- Q = Qualifier
- WC = Wild card
- LL = Lucky loser
- Alt = Alternate
- SE = Special exempt
- PR = Protected ranking
- ITF = ITF entry
- JE = Junior exempt
- w/o = Walkover
- r = Retired
- d = Defaulted
- SR = Special ranking

First round

Quarterfinals

Semifinals

Final

1
- (United States) **Z Garrison**
- (United States) **K Horvath**
**6**
**7**

- (United States) L Spadea
- (Brazil) A Vieira
4
6

1
- (United States) Z Garrison
- (United States) K Horvath
4
**6**
6

- (Belgium) I de Ruysscher
- (Belgium) C van Renterghem
6
1

- (Italy) **C Nozzoli**
- (Belgium) **K Schuurmans**
**6**
1
**7**

- (Italy) **C Nozzoli**
- (Belgium) **K Schuurmans**
**7**
**6**

- (Italy) C Nozzoli
- (Belgium) K Schuurmans
3
2

3
- (Bulgaria) **K Maleeva**
- (Italy) **R Reggi**
**6**
5
**6**

3
- (Bulgaria) **K Maleeva**
- (Italy) **R Reggi**
**6**
**6**

- (Italy) S La Fratta
- (Spain) M J Llorca
4
**7**
2

3
- (Bulgaria) **K Maleeva**
- (Italy) **R Reggi**
1
**6**
**6**

- (Belgium) **A Devries**
- (Netherlands) **N Jagerman**
**6**
**6**

- (Belgium) A Devries
- (Netherlands) N Jagerman
**6**
4
3

- (France) I Crudo
- (Spain) I Varas
3
3

3
- (Bulgaria) Katerina Maleeva
- (Italy) Raffaella Reggi
6
1

- (Brazil) **N Dias**
- (Italy) **L Golarsa**
**6**
**6**

2
- (Argentina) **Mercedes Paz**
- (Denmark) **Tine Scheuer-Larsen**
**7**
**6**

- (Greece) O Tsarbopoulou
- (United Kingdom) C Wood
2
0

- (Brazil) N Dias
- (Italy) L Golarsa
0
3

- (Australia) L O'Neill
- (Netherlands) S Schilder
4
6

4
- (Spain) **A Sánchez**
- (Belgium) **S Wasserman**
**6**
**6**

4
- (Spain) **A Sánchez**
- (Belgium) **S Wasserman**
**6**
**7**

4
- (Spain) A Sánchez
- (Belgium) S Wasserman
0
**6**
5

- (West Germany) **I Cueto**
- (West Germany) **S Meier**
**6**
**2**

2
- (Argentina) **M Paz**
- (Denmark) **T Scheuer-Larsen**
**6**
4
**7**

- (Switzerland) C Cohen
- (Brazil) P Medrado
4
0
r

- (West Germany) I Cueto
- (West Germany) S Meier
1
4

- (Greece) A Kanellopoulou
- (Italy) B Romanò
1
1

2
- (Argentina) **M Paz**
- (Denmark) **T Scheuer-Larsen**
**6**
**6**

2
- (Argentina) **M Paz**
- (Denmark) **T Scheuer-Larsen**
**6**
**6**
