= 1989 Belgian Open – Doubles =

Doubles
- 1989 Belgian Open
- 1988 Champions: (Argentina) Mercedes Paz (Denmark) Tine Scheuer-Larsen

Final
- Champions: (Netherlands) Manon Bollegraf (Argentina) Mercedes Paz
- Runners-up: (Netherlands) Carin Bakkum (Netherlands) Simone Schilder
- Score: 6–1, 6–2

Details
- Draw: 16
- Seeds: 4

Events
Singles	Doubles
← 1988 ·	Belgian Open	· 1990 →

Mercedes Paz and Tine Scheuer-Larsen were the defending champions but only Paz competed that year with Manon Bollegraf.

Bollegraf and Paz won in the final 6–1, 6–2 against Carin Bakkum and Simone Schilder.

== Seeds ==
Champion seeds are indicated in bold text while text in italics indicates the round in which those seeds were eliminated.

1. (Netherlands) **Manon Bollegraf** / (Argentina) **Mercedes Paz (champions)**
2. (Netherlands) Carin Bakkum / (Netherlands) Simone Schilder (final)
3. (France) Nathalie Herreman / (Belgium) Sandra Wasserman (semifinals)
4. (Brazil) Neige Dias / (Italy) Silvia La Fratta (first round)

== Draw ==
=== Key ===
- Q = Qualifier
- WC = Wild card
- LL = Lucky loser
- Alt = Alternate
- SE = Special exempt
- PR = Protected ranking
- ITF = ITF entry
- JE = Junior exempt
- w/o = Walkover
- r = Retired
- d = Defaulted
- SR = Special ranking

First round

Quarterfinals

Semifinals

Final

1
- (Netherlands) **M Bollegraf**
- (Argentina) **M Paz**
**7**
**6**

- (United States) A Farley
- (United States) A Leand
5
4

1
- (Netherlands) **M Bollegraf**
- (Argentina) **M Paz**
**6**
**6**

- (Italy) **C Caverzasio**
- (Greece) **A Kanellopoulou**
**6**
**6**

- (Italy) C Caverzasio
- (Greece) A Kanellopoulou
1
2

- (Belgium) I de Ruysscher
- (France) N Guerrée
0
1

1
- (Netherlands) **M Bollegraf**
- (Argentina) **M Paz**
**w/o**

4
- (Brazil) N Dias
- (Italy) S La Fratta
2
5

- (Soviet Union) N Medvedeva
- (Finland) P Thorén

- (Soviet Union) **N Medvedeva**
- (Finland) **P Thorén**
**6**
**7**

- (Soviet Union) **N Medvedeva**
- (Finland) **P Thorén**
**7**
**6**

- (Czechoslovakia) **L Lásková**
- (Hungary) **P Schmitt**
**6**
4
**6**

- (Czechoslovakia) L Lásková
- (Hungary) P Schmitt
5
3

- (Belgium) A Devries
- (France) P Paradis
2
**6**
4

1
- (Netherlands) **Manon Bollegraf**
- (Argentina) **Mercedes Paz**
**6**
**6**

- (Belgium) V de la Noye
- (Belgium) S Hoormaert

2
- (Netherlands) Carin Bakkum
- (Netherlands) Simone Schilder
1
2

- (Italy) **C Nozzoli**
- (Argentina) **A Tiezzi**
**w/o**

- (Italy) C Nozzoli
- (Argentina) A Tiezzi
2
4

- (West Germany) S Meier
- (Netherlands) A van Buuren
**6**
4
2

3
- (France) **N Herreman**
- (Belgium) **S Wasserman**
**6**
**6**

3
- (France) **N Herreman**
- (Belgium) **S Wasserman**
3
**6**
**6**

3
- (France) N Herreman
- (Belgium) S Wasserman
4
2

- (Italy) **M Grossi**
- (Italy) **B Romanò**
**6**
**6**

2
- (Netherlands) **C Bakkum**
- (Netherlands) **S Schilder**
**6**
**6**

- (Belgium) S Appelmans
- (Belgium) C van Renterghem
2
4

- (Italy) M Grossi
- (Italy) B Romanò
3
3

- (West Germany) S Frankl
- (United Kingdom) C Wood
5
**7**
4

2
- (Netherlands) **C Bakkum**
- (Netherlands) **S Schilder**
**6**
**6**

2
- (Netherlands) **C Bakkum**
- (Netherlands) **S Schilder**
**7**
6
**6**
