= 1989 Belgian Open – Singles =

Singles
- 1989 Belgian Open
- 1988 Champion: (Spain) Arantxa Sánchez

Final
- Champion: (Czechoslovakia) Radka Zrubáková
- Runner-up: (Argentina) Mercedes Paz
- Score: 7–6, 6–4

Details
- Draw: 32
- Seeds: 8

Events
| Singles | Doubles |
| ← 1988 · | Belgian Open | · 1990 → |

Arantxa Sánchez was the defending champion but did not compete that year.

Radka Zrubáková won in the final 7–6, 6–4 against Mercedes Paz.

== Seeds ==
A champion seed is indicated in bold text while text in italics indicates the round in which that seed was eliminated.

1. (Czechoslovakia) Jana Novotná (quarterfinals)
2. (Czechoslovakia) **Radka Zrubáková (champion)**
3. (Netherlands) Manon Bollegraf (semifinals)
4. (Belgium) Sandra Wasserman (quarterfinals)
5. (Brazil) Neige Dias (first round)
6. (Netherlands) Brenda Schultz (quarterfinals)
7. (Argentina) Mercedes Paz (final)
8. (Greece) Angeliki Kanellopoulou (second round)

== Draw ==
=== Key ===
- Q = Qualifier
- WC = Wild card
- LL = Lucky loser
- Alt = Alternate
- SE = Special exempt
- PR = Protected ranking
- ITF = ITF entry
- JE = Junior exempt
- w/o = Walkover
- r = Retired
- d = Defaulted
- SR = Special ranking

First round
1 | (Czechoslovakia) **J Novotná** | **6** | **6**
(Belgium) A Devries | 1 | 1
(United States) A Farley | 0 | 5
(West Germany) **W Probst** | **6** | **7**
(Italy) **B Romanò** | **7** | 1 | **6**
(West Germany) S Frankl | 6 | **6** | 1
(Belgium) C van Renterghem | 6 | 6
7 | (Argentina) **M Paz** | **7** | **7**
3 | (Netherlands) **M Bollegraf** | **6** | 1 | **7**
(West Germany) S Meier | 0 | **6** | 5
(Italy) **C Caverzasio** | 4 | **6** | **6**
(France) N Herreman | **6** | 2 | 1
(Netherlands) C Bakkum | 1 | 2
(Czechoslovakia) **L Lásková** | **6** | **6**
LL | (Bulgaria) **M Maleeva** | 2 | **6** | **6**
5 | (Brazil) N Dias | **6** | 3 | 2
8 | (Greece) **A Kanellopoulou** | **6** | **6**
(Belgium) I de Ruysscher | 2 | 4
Q | (Soviet Union) N Medvedeva | 4 | 0
(Netherlands) **N Jagerman** | **6** | **6**
Q | (United States) A Leand | 1 | 3
(Italy) **L Lapi** | **6** | **6**
(Belgium) S Appelmans | 1 | 4
4 | (Belgium) **S Wasserman** | **6** | **6**
6 | (Netherlands) **B Schultz** | **6** | **7**
(United Kingdom) C Wood | 2 | 5
(Italy) S La Fratta | **6** | 4 | 6
Q | (France) **M Laval** | 1 | **6** | **7**
Q | (Italy) S Farina | 5 | 2
(France) **N Guerrée** | **7** | **6**
(France) M-C Damas | 4 | 4
2 | (Czechoslovakia) **R Zrubáková** | **6** | **6**

Second round
1 | (Czechoslovakia) **J Novotná** | **6** | **6**
(West Germany) W Probst | 3 | 2
(Italy) B Romanò | 4 | 3
7 | (Argentina) **M Paz** | **6** | **6**
3 | (Netherlands) **M Bollegraf** | **6** | **6**
(Italy) C Caverzasio | 2 | 2
(Czechoslovakia) **L Lásková** | **6** | **6**
LL | (Bulgaria) M Maleeva | 4 | 0
8 | (Greece) A Kanellopoulou | **6** | 4 | 0
(Netherlands) **N Jagerman** | 4 | **6** | **6**
(Italy) L Lapi | **6** | 4 | 0
4 | (Belgium) **S Wasserman** | 3 | **6** | **6**
6 | (Netherlands) **B Schultz** | **6** | **6**
Q | (France) M Laval | 3 | 1
(France) N Guerrée | 0 | 1
2 | (Czechoslovakia) **R Zrubáková** | **6** | **6**

Quarterfinals
1 | (Czechoslovakia) J Novotná | 0 | **6** | 2
7 | (Argentina) **M Paz** | **6** | 2 | **6**
3 | (Netherlands) **M Bollegraf** | **6** | 4 | **6**
(Czechoslovakia) L Lásková | 4 | **6** | 4
(Netherlands) **N Jagerman** | **6** | 4 | **7**
4 | (Belgium) S Wasserman | 3 | **6** | 6
6 | (Netherlands) B Schultz | 2 | 3
2 | (Czechoslovakia) **R Zrubáková** | **6** | **6**

Semifinals
7 | (Argentina) **M Paz** | 6 | **6** | **6**
3 | (Netherlands) M Bollegraf | **7** | 4 | 3
(Netherlands) N Jagerman | 3 | 1
2 | (Czechoslovakia) **R Zrubáková** | **6** | **6**

Final
7 | (Argentina) Mercedes Paz | 6 | 4
2 | (Czechoslovakia) **Radka Zrubáková** | **7** | **6**
