= WTA Brasil Open =

Tennis tournaments held in Brazil

The WTA Brasil Open was founded in 1977 as the successor event to the earlier Brazilian International Championships (1932–1969).

Although the WTA itself currently does not acknowledge many of these tournaments to be new editions of one larger tournament, a part of historians, the press, and the media, see them as only one tournament despite changes in names, cities, surfaces, and various hiatus.

== Finals ==
=== Singles ===
Location	Year	Champion	Runner-up	Score	Ref
World Tour event
São Paulo	1977	(United States) Billie Jean King	(Netherlands) Betty Stöve	6–1, 6–4	
São Paulo	1978–83	Not held			
Rio de Janeiro	1984	(Italy) Sandra Cecchini	(Argentina) Adriana Villagrán-Reami	6–3, 6–3	
São Paulo	1985	(Argentina) Mercedes Paz	(Peru) Laura Arraya	5–7, 6–1, 6–4	
São Paulo	1986	(United States) Vicki Nelson-Dunbar	(United States) Jenny Klitch	6–2, 7–6^{(7–1)}	
Guarujá	1987	(Brazil) Niege Dias	(Brazil) Patricia Medrado	6–0, 6–7, 6–4	
Guarujá	1988	(Argentina) Mercedes Paz (2)	(Canada) Rene Simpson	7–5, 6–2	
Guarujá	1989	(Argentina) Federica Haumüller	(Argentina) Patricia Tarabini	7–6^{(9–7)}, 6–4	
São Paulo	1990	(Germany) Veronika Martinek	(United States) Donna Faber	6–2, 6–4	
São Paulo	1991	(Germany) Sabine Hack	(Germany) Veronika Martinek	6–3, 7–5	
São Paulo	1992	Not held			
Curitiba	1993	(Germany) Sabine Hack (2)	(Argentina) Florencia Labat	6–2, 6–0	
Curitiba	1994–98	Not held			
São Paulo	1999	(Colombia) Fabiola Zuluaga	(Austria) Patricia Wartusch	7–5, 4–6, 7–5	
Tier IV event
São Paulo	2000	(Hungary) Rita Kuti-Kis	(Argentina) Paola Suárez	4–6, 6–4, 7–5	
Tier II event
Mata de São João	2001	(United States) Monica Seles	(Socialist Federal Republic of Yugoslavia) Jelena Dokić	6–3, 6–3	
Mata de São João	2002	(Russia) Anastasia Myskina	(Greece) Eleni Daniilidou	6–3, 0–6, 6–2	

=== Doubles ===
Location	Year	Champions	Runners-up	Score	Ref
World Tour event
São Paulo	1977	(Australia) Kerry Reid (Australia) Wendy Turnbull	(South Africa) Linky Boshoff (South Africa) Ilana Kloss	6–3, 5–7, 6–2	
São Paulo	1978–83	Not held			
Rio de Janeiro	1984	(Canada) Jill Hetherington (Canada) Hélène Pelletier	(United States) Penny Barg-Mager (United States) Kyle Copeland	6–3, 2–6, 7–6	
São Paulo	1985	(Argentina) Mercedes Paz (Argentina) Gabriela Sabatini	(Brazil) Niege Dias (Hungary) Csilla Bartos	7–5, 6–4	
São Paulo	1986	(Brazil) Neige Dias (Brazil) Patricia Medrado	(Peru) Laura Arraya (Austria) Petra Huber	6–4, 4–6, 7–6^{(8–6)}	
Guarujá	1987	(United States) Katrina Adams (United States) Cheryl Jones	(Canada) Jill Hetherington (Argentina) Mercedes Paz	6–3, 6–4	
Guarujá	1988	(Argentina) Bettina Fulco (Argentina) Mercedes Paz (2)	(Netherlands) Carin Bakkum (Netherlands) Simone Schilder	7–5, 6–2	
Guarujá	1989	(Argentina) Mercedes Paz (3) (Argentina) Patricia Tarabini	(Brazil) Cláudia Chabalgoity (Brazil) Luciana Corsato	6–2, 6–2	
São Paulo	1990	(Argentina) Bettina Fulco (Czechoslovakia) Eva Švíglerová	(France) Mary Pierce (United States) Luanne Spadea	7–5, 6–4	
São Paulo	1991	(Argentina) Inés Gorrochategui (Argentina) Mercedes Paz (4)	(United States) Renata Baranski (United States) Laura Glitz	6–2, 6–2	
São Paulo	1992	Not held			
Curitiba	1993	(Germany) Sabine Hack (Germany) Veronika Martinek	(Brazil) Cláudia Chabalgoity (Brazil) Andrea Vieira	6–2, 7–6^{(7–4)}	
Curitiba	1994–98	Not held			
São Paulo	1999	(Argentina) Laura Montalvo (Argentina) Paola Suárez	(Slovakia) Janette Husárová (Argentina) Florencia Labat	6–7^{(7–9)}, 7–5, 7–5	
Tier IV event
São Paulo	2000	(Argentina) Laura Montalvo (2) (Argentina) Paola Suárez (2)	(Slovakia) Janette Husárová (Argentina) Florencia Labat	5–7, 6–4, 6–3	
Tier II event
Mata de São João	2001	(South Africa) Amanda Coetzer (United States) Lori McNeil	(United States) Nicole Arendt (Argentina) Patricia Tarabini	6–7^{(8–10)}, 6–2, 6–4	
Mata de São João	2002	(Spain) Virginia Ruano Pascual (Argentina) Paola Suárez (3)	(France) Émilie Loit (Paraguay) Rossana de los Ríos	6–4, 6–1	
