= 1988 Belgian Open – Singles =

Singles
- 1988 Belgian Open
- 1987 Champion: (United States) Kathleen Horvath

Final
- Champion: (Spain) Arantxa Sánchez
- Runner-up: (Italy) Raffaella Reggi
- Score: 6–0, 7–5

Events
Singles	Doubles
← 1987 ·	Belgian Open	· 1989 →

Kathleen Horvath was the defending champion but lost in the first round to Silvia La Fratta.

Arantxa Sánchez won in the final 6–0, 7–5 against Raffaella Reggi.

== Seeds ==
A champion seed is indicated in bold text while text in italics indicates the round in which that seed was eliminated.

1. (United States) Zina Garrison (quarterfinals)
2. (Bulgaria) Katerina Maleeva (second round)
3. (Italy) Raffaella Reggi (final)
4. (Spain) **Arantxa Sánchez (champion)**
5. (West Germany) Isabel Cueto (semifinals)
6. (Brazil) Neige Dias (quarterfinals)
7. (United States) Kathleen Horvath (first round)
8. (Argentina) Mercedes Paz (quarterfinals)

== Draw ==
=== Key ===
- Q = Qualifier
- WC = Wild card
- LL = Lucky loser
- Alt = Alternate
- SE = Special exempt
- PR = Protected ranking
- ITF = ITF entry
- JE = Junior exempt
- w/o = Walkover
- r = Retired
- d = Defaulted
- SR = Special ranking

First round
1	(United States) **Z Garrison**	**6**	**6**
(Belgium) C van Renterghem	3	4
(Brazil) A Vieira	**6**	5	4
(Switzerland) **C Cohen**	3	**7**	**6**
Q	(Spain) **I Varas**	**6**	**6**
(Australia) L O'Neill	3	3
(Sweden) M Strandlund	2	3
5	(West Germany) **I Cueto**	**6**	**6**
4	(Spain) **A Sánchez**	**6**	**6**
(West Germany) S Meier	0	1
(Netherlands) **N Jagerman**	5	**6**	**6**
(Belgium) A Devries	**7**	1	3
(Greece) **O Tsarbopoulou**	4	**6**	**4**
(Italy) B Romanò	**6**	3	3/r
(Belgium) S Wasserman	0	2
8	(Argentina) **M Paz**	**6**	**6**
7	(United States) K Horvath	5	**7**	4
(Italy) **S La Fratta**	**7**	5	**6**
(Netherlands) S Schilder	1	3
(Brazil) **P Medrado**	**6**	**6**
Q	(France) **S Niox-Chateau**	**6**	**6**
(Belgium) S Appelmans	4	2
(West Germany) V Martinek	1	0
3	(Italy) **R Reggi**	**6**	**6**
6	(Brazil) **N Dias**	**6**	**6**
Q	(Sweden) J Jonerup	1	3
Q	(Italy) S Dalla Valle	2	0
(United Kingdom) **C Wood**	**6**	**6**
(Greece) **A Kanellopoulou**	**6**	**7**
(Denmark) T Scheuer-Larsen	4	5
(Italy) L Golarsa	1	0
2	(Bulgaria) **K Maleeva**	**6**	**6**

Second round
1	(United States) **Z Garrison**	**7**	**6**
(Switzerland) C Cohen	5	4
Q	(Spain) I Varas	1	0
5	(West Germany) **I Cueto**	**6**	**6**
4	(Spain) **A Sánchez**	**6**	**6**
(Netherlands) N Jagerman	3	3
(Greece) O Tsarbopoulou	5	**6**	2
8	(Argentina) **M Paz**	**7**	2	**6**
(Italy) **S La Fratta**	**7**	**6**
(Brazil) P Medrado	5	4
Q	(France) S Niox-Chateau	4	**6**	4
3	(Italy) **R Reggi**	**6**	4	**6**
6	(Brazil) **N Dias**	**6**	**6**
(United Kingdom) C Wood	3	1
(Greece) **A Kanellopoulou**	1	**6**	**6**
2	(Bulgaria) K Maleeva	**6**	4	0

Quarterfinals
1	(United States) Z Garrison	4	5
5	(West Germany) **I Cueto**	**6**	**7**
4	(Spain) **A Sánchez**	**6**	**6**
8	(Argentina) M Paz	2	2
(Italy) S La Fratta	4	2
3	(Italy) **R Reggi**	**6**	**6**
6	(Brazil) N Dias	5	1
(Greece) **A Kanellopoulou**	**7**	**6**

Semifinals
5	(West Germany) I Cueto	0	4
4	(Spain) **A Sánchez**	**6**	**6**
3	(Italy) **R Reggi**	**6**	**6**
(Greece) A Kanellopoulou	2	2

Final
4	(Spain) **Arantxa Sánchez**	**6**	**7**
3	(Italy) Raffaella Reggi	0	5
