= 1987 Brazilian Open =

- Date: 7–13 December
- Edition: 5th
- Category: 1
- Draw: 32S / 16D
- Prize money: $50,000
- Surface: Clay
- Location: Guarujá, Brazil

Champions

Singles
- (Brazil) Neige Dias

Doubles
- (United States) Katrina Adams / (United States) Cheryl Jones
- Brasil Open

The 1987 Brazilian Open was a women's tennis tournament played on outdoor clay courts in Guarujá in Brazil and was part of the Category 1 tier of the 1988 Virginia Slims World Championship Series. It was the inaugural edition of the tournament and was held from 7 December through 13 December 1987. Unseeded Neige Dias won the singles title.

== Finals ==
=== Singles ===
(Brazil) Neige Dias defeated (Brazil) Patricia Medrado 6–0, 6–7^{(2–7)}, 6–4

- It was Dias' only title of the year and the 2nd of her career.

=== Doubles ===
(United States) Katrina Adams / (United States) Cheryl Jones defeated (Canada) Jill Hetherington / (Argentina) Mercedes Paz 6–4, 4–6, 6–4

- It was Adams' only title of the year and the 1st of her career. It was Jones' only title of the year and the 1st of her career.
