= 1990 Nivea Cup =

- Date: 29 November – 2 December
- Edition: 8th
- Category: Tier V
- Draw: 32S / 16D
- Prize money: $75,000
- Surface: Clay / outdoor
- Location: São Paulo, Brazil
- Venue: Esporte Clube Pinheiros

Champions

Singles
- (Germany) Veronika Martinek

Doubles
- (Argentina) Bettina Fulco / (Czechoslovakia) Eva Švíglerová
- Brasil Open

The 1990 Nivea Cup was a women's tennis tournament played on outdoor clay courts at the Esporte Clube Pinheiros in São Paulo, Brazil and was part of the Tier V category of the 1991 WTA Tour. It was the eighth edition of the tournament and was held from 29 November through 2 December 1990. Fifth-seeded Veronika Martinek won the singles title and earned $13,500 first-prize money.

== Finals ==
=== Singles ===
(Germany) Veronika Martinek defeated (United States) Donna Faber 6–2, 6–4

- It was Martinek's only singles title of her career.

=== Doubles ===
(Argentina) Bettina Fulco / (Czechoslovakia) Eva Švíglerová defeated (France) Mary Pierce / (United States) Luanne Spadea 7–5, 6–4

- It was Fulco's only doubles title of the year and the 2nd of her career. It was Švíglerov's only doubles title of her career.
