= 1989 Rainha Cup =

- Date: 11–17 December
- Edition: 7th
- Category: Tier V
- Draw: 32S / 16D
- Prize money: $75,000
- Surface: Hard
- Location: Guarujá, Brazil
- Venue: Casa Grande Hotel

Champions

Singles
- (Argentina) Federica Haumüller

Doubles
- (Argentina) Mercedes Paz / (Argentina) Patricia Tarabini
- Brasil Open

The 1989 Rainha Cup was a women's tennis tournament played on outdoor hard courts at the Casa Grande Hotel in Guarujá, Brazil and was part of the Tier V category of the 1990 WTA Tour. It was the seventh edition of the tournament and was held from 11 December through 17 December 1989. Unseeded Federica Haumüller won the singles title and earned $13,5000 first-prize money.

== Finals ==
=== Singles ===
(Argentina) Federica Haumüller defeated (Argentina) Patricia Tarabini 7–6^{(9–7)}, 6–4

- It was Haumüller's only singles title of her career.

=== Doubles ===
(Argentina) Mercedes Paz / (Argentina) Patricia Tarabini defeated (Brazil) Cláudia Chabalgoity / (Brazil) Luciana Corsato 6–2, 6–2
