= 1991 Nivea Cup =

- Date: 2–8 December
- Edition: 9th
- Category: Tier V
- Draw: 32S / 16D
- Prize money: $75,000
- Surface: Clay / outdoor
- Location: São Paulo, Brazil
- Venue: Esporte Clube Pinheiros

Champions

Singles
- (Germany) Sabine Hack

Doubles
- (Argentina) Inés Gorrochategui / (Argentina) Mercedes Paz
- Brasil Open

The 1991 Nivea Cup was a women's tennis tournament played on outdoor clay courts at the Esporte Clube Pinheiros in São Paulo, Brazil and was part of the Tier V category of the 1992 WTA Tour. It was the ninth edition of the tournament and was held from 2 December through 8 December 1991. Sixth-seeded Sabine Hack won the singles title and earned $13,500 first-prize money.

== Finals ==
=== Singles ===
(Germany) Sabine Hack defeated (Germany) Veronika Martinek 6–3, 7–5

- It was Hack's only singles title of the year and the 1st of her career.

=== Doubles ===
(Argentina) Inés Gorrochategui / (Argentina) Mercedes Paz defeated (United States) Renata Baranski / (United States) Laura Glitz 6–2, 6–2

- It was Gorrochategui's only doubles title of the year and the 1st of her career. It was Paz's only doubles title of the year and the 20th of her career.
