= 1993 Bancesa Classic =

- Date: 25–31 October
- Edition: 10th
- Category: Tier V
- Draw: 32S / 16D
- Prize money: $100,000
- Surface: Clay / outdoor
- Location: Curitiba, Brazil
- Venue: Graciosa Country Club

Champions

Singles
- (Germany) Sabine Hack

Doubles
- (Germany) Sabine Hack / (Germany) Veronika Martinek
- Brasil Open

The 1993 Bancesa Classic was a women's tennis tournament played on outdoor clay courts at the Graciosa Country Club in Curitiba, Brazil and was part of the Tier V category of the 1993 WTA Tour. It was the tenth edition of the tournament and was held from 25 October through 31 October 1993. First-seeded Sabine Hack won her second consecutive singles title at the event and earned $18,000 first-prize money.

== Finals ==
=== Singles ===
(Germany) Sabine Hack defeated (Argentina) Florencia Labat 6–2, 6–0

- It was Hack's only singles title of the year and the 2nd of her career.

=== Doubles ===
(Germany) Sabine Hack / (Germany) Veronika Martinek defeated (Brazil) Cláudia Chabalgoity / (Brazil) Andrea Vieira 6–2, 7–6^{(7–4)}

- It was Hack's only doubles title of her career. It was Martinek's only doubles title of her career.
