= 1977 Colgate Brazil Open =

- Date: 17–23 October 1977
- Edition: 1st
- Category: WTA Tour (Colgate Series)
- Draw: 32S / 16D
- Prize money: $75,000
- Surface: Hard
- Location: São Paulo, Brazil

Champions

Singles
- (United States) Billie Jean King

Doubles
- (Australia) Kerry Reid / (Australia) Wendy Turnbull
- WTA Brasil Open

The 1977 Colgate Brazil Open was a women's tennis tournament played on outdoor hard courts in São Paulo in Brazil and was part of the 1977 WTA Tour (Colgate Series). The tournament was held from 17 October through 23 October 1977. It was the inaugural edition of the tournament. Billie Jean King won the singles title. Kerry Reid and Wendy Turnbull won the doubles title.

== Finals ==
=== Singles ===
(United States) Billie Jean King defeated (Netherlands) Betty Stöve 6–1, 6–4

=== Doubles ===
(Australia) Kerry Reid / (United States) Wendy Turnbull defeated (United States) Martina Navratilova / (Netherlands) Betty Stöve 6–3, 5–7, 6–2
