= 1989 Belgian Open =

Tennis tournament

- Date: 17–23 July
- Edition: 3rd
- Category: Category 2
- Draw: 32S / 16D
- Prize money: $100,000
- Surface: Clay / outdoor
- Location: Brussels, Belgium

Champions

Singles
- (Czechoslovakia) Radka Zrubáková

Doubles
- (Netherlands) Manon Bollegraf / (Argentina) Mercedes Paz
← 1988 ·	Belgian Open	· 1990 →

The 1989 Belgian Open was a women's tennis tournament played on outdoor clay courts in Brussels, Belgium that was part of the Category 2 tier of the 1989 WTA Tour. It was the third edition of the tournament and was held from 17 July until 23 July 1989. Second-seeded Radka Zrubáková won the singles title.

== Finals ==
=== Singles ===
(Czechoslovakia) Radka Zrubáková defeated (Argentina) Mercedes Paz 7–6^{(8–6)}, 6–4

- It was Zrubáková's only title of the year and the 1st of her career.

=== Doubles ===
(Netherlands) Manon Bollegraf / (Argentina) Mercedes Paz defeated (Netherlands) Carin Bakkum / (Netherlands) Simone Schilder 6–1, 6–2

- It was Bollegraf's 3rd title of the year and the 4th of her career. It was Paz's 3rd title of the year and the 15th of her career.
