= 1988 Rainha Cup =

- Date: 7–13 November
- Edition: 6th
- Category: Category 1
- Draw: 32S / 16D
- Prize money: $50,000
- Surface: Hard
- Location: Guarujá, Brazil

Champions

Singles
- (Argentina) Mercedes Paz

Doubles
- (Argentina) Bettina Fulco / (Argentina) Mercedes Paz
- Brasil Open

The 1988 WTA Brasil Open (also called the Rainha Cup) was a women's tennis tournament played on outdoor hard courts in Guarujá in Brazil and was part of the Category 1 tier of the 1988 WTA Tour. The tournament ran from 7 November through 13 November 1988. Third-seeded Mercedes Paz won the singles title.

== Finals ==
=== Singles ===
(Argentina) Mercedes Paz defeated (Canada) Rene Simpson 7–5, 6–2

- It was Paz's 1st singles title of the year and the 2nd of her career.

=== Doubles ===
(Argentina) Bettina Fulco / (Argentina) Mercedes Paz defeated (Netherlands) Carin Bakkum / (Netherlands) Simone Schilder 6–3, 6–4

- It was Fulco's only title of the year and the 1st of her career. It was Paz's 4th title of the year and the 12th of her career.
