= 1988 Belgian Open =

- Date: 11–17 July
- Edition: 2nd
- Category: Category 1
- Draw: 32S / 16D
- Prize money: $75,000
- Surface: Clay / outdoor
- Location: Brussels, Belgium

Champions

Singles
- (Spain) Arantxa Sánchez

Doubles
- (Argentina) Mercedes Paz / (Denmark) Tine Scheuer-Larsen
← 1987 ·	Belgian Open	· 1989 →

The 1988 Belgian Open was a women's tennis tournament played on outdoor clay courts in Brussels, Belgium and was part of the Category 1 tier of the 1988 WTA Tour. It was the second edition of the tournament ran from 11 July until 17 July 1988. Fourth-seeded Arantxa Sánchez won the singles final.

== Finals ==
=== Singles ===
(Spain) Arantxa Sánchez defeated (Italy) Raffaella Reggi 6–0, 7–5

- It was Sánchez Vicario's only title of the year and the 2nd of her career.

=== Doubles ===
(Argentina) Mercedes Paz / (Denmark) Tine Scheuer-Larsen defeated (Bulgaria) Katerina Maleeva / (Italy) Raffaella Reggi 7–6^{(7–3)}, 6–1

- It was Paz's 2nd title of the year and the 10th of her career. It was Scheuer-Larsen's 1st title of the year and the 3rd of her career.
