= 1977 Colgate Brazil Open – Doubles =

Doubles
- 1977 Colgate Brazil Open

Final
- Champions: (Australia) Kerry Reid / (United States) Wendy Turnbull
- Runners-up: (United States) Martina Navratilova / (Netherlands) Betty Stöve
- Score: 6–3, 5–7, 6–2

Details
- Draw: 16
- Seeds: 4

Events
Singles	Doubles
- WTA Brasil Open

Kerry Reid and Wendy Turnbull won the 1977 Colgate Brazil Open doubles title, defeating Martina Navratilova and Betty Stöve in the final, 6–3, 5–7, 6–2.

== Seeds ==
1. (United States) Martina Navratilova / (Netherlands) Betty Stöve (final)
2. (Australia) Helen Gourlay / (United States) JoAnne Russell (semifinals)
3. (United States) Rosie Casals / (United States) Billie Jean King (semifinals)
4. (Australia) Kerry Reid / (United States) Wendy Turnbull (champions)

== Draw ==
Key

- Q = Qualifier
- WC = Wild card
- LL = Lucky loser
- Alt = Alternate
- ITF = ITF entry
- PR = Protected ranking
- SR = Special ranking
- SE = Special exempt
- JE = Junior exempt
- JR = Junior Accelerator Programme entrant
- CO = College Accelerator Programme entrant
- NG = Next Gen Accelerator Program entrant
- w/o = Walkover
- r = Retired
- d = Defaulted

First Round
1	(United States) M. Navratilova (Netherlands) B. Stöve	6	6
(United States) M. Harper (United States) M. Struthers	1	1
(United States) T. Holladay (United States) P. Smith	7	7
(Uruguay) F. Bonicelli (Germany) K. Ebbinghaus	5	6
3	(United States) R. Casals (United States) B. J. King	7	6
(Australia) D. Fromholtz (United States) P. Teeguarden	5	2
(France) F. Dürr (United States) K. Shaw	6	6
(Brazil) M. Matte (Chile) S. Urroz	0	2
(United States) B. Bruning (United States) S. Walsh	7	2	7
(United States) B. Nagelsen (Romania) V. Ruzici	6	6	6
(United States) J. Anthony (United States) L. duPont	1	4
4	(Australia) K. Reid (Australia) W. Turnbull	6	6
(Germany) I. Riedel (United States) C.-A. Thomas	0	4
(Romania) F. Mihai (Czechoslovakia) R. Tomanová	6	6
(Brazil) G. Langela (Brazil) P. Medrado
2	(Australia) H. Cawley (United States) J. Russell

Quarterfinals
1	(United States) M. Navratilova (Netherlands) B. Stöve	w/o
(United States) T. Holladay (United States) P. Smith
3	(United States) R. Casals (United States) B. J. King	4	6	6
(France) F. Dürr (United States) K. Shaw	6	3	0
(United States) B. Bruning (United States) S. Walsh	3	6
4	(Australia) K. Reid (Australia) W. Turnbull	6	7
(Romania) F. Mihai (Czechoslovakia) R. Tomanová	4	1
2	(Australia) H. Cawley (United States) J. Russell	6	6

Semifinals
1	(United States) M. Navratilova (Netherlands) B. Stöve	6	6
3	(United States) R. Casals (United States) B. J. King	4	4
4	(Australia) K. Reid (Australia) W. Turnbull	6	6
2	(Australia) H. Cawley (United States) J. Russell	2	4

Final
1	(United States) M. Navratilova (Netherlands) B. Stöve	3	7	2
4	(Australia) K. Reid (Australia) W. Turnbull	6	5	6
