= Yvonne der Kinderen =

Dutch tennis player

- Country (sports): Netherlands
- Born: 26 October 1965 (age 59)
- Prize money: $11,035

Singles
- Career record: 44–40
- Career titles: 1 ITF
- Highest ranking: No. 208 (18 January 1988)

Doubles
- Career record: 25–19
- Career titles: 2 ITF
- Highest ranking: No. 183 (15 February 1988)

Yvonne der Kinderen (born 26 October 1965) is a Dutch former professional tennis player.

Der Kinderen had a career high singles ranking of 208 in the world and a best doubles ranking of 183. Her best singles performance on the WTA Tour came at the 1987 Argentine Open, where she won main draw matches against Gisele Faria and Karmen Skulj, then took a set off second seed Isabel Cueto in a third round loss.

Her daughter Merel Hoedt is a tennis player and competes on the professional tour.

== ITF finals ==
=== Singles: 2 (1–1) ===
Result	No.	Date	Tournament	Surface	Opponent	Score
Loss	1.	19 November 1986	Jerusalem, Israel	Hard	(Israel) Ilana Berger	2–6, 4–6
Win	2.	26 July 1987	Amsterdam, Netherlands	Hard	(West Germany) Gudrun Levers	6–2, 6–2

=== Doubles: 3 (2–1) ===
Result	No.	Date	Tournament	Surface	Partner	Opponents	Score
Win	1.	31 May 1987	Bad Gastein, Austria	Clay	(Netherlands) Hester Witvoet	(Hungary) Katalin Darvas (Hungary) Rita Kowacsics	6–2, 6–0
Loss	2.	26 July 1987	Amsterdam, Netherlands	Clay	(Netherlands) Inga Dolman	(Netherlands) Gaby Coorengel (Netherlands) Caroline Vis	3–6, 6–3, 1–6
Win	3.	27 September 1987	Šibenik, Yugoslavia	Clay	(Netherlands) Hester Witvoet	(Sweden) Jonna Jonerup (Sweden) Maria Strandlund	6–3, 6–3
