= Petra Schmitt =

Hungarian tennis player

- Country (sports): Hungary
- Born: 24 October 1971 (age 54)
- Prize money: $11,041

Singles
- Highest ranking: No. 419 (8 July 1991)

Doubles
- Highest ranking: No. 287 (2 April 1990)

Petra Schmitt (born 24 October 1971) is a Hungarian former professional tennis player.

== Biography ==
=== Tennis career ===
Schmitt started playing professional tournaments in 1987 and featured mostly on the ITF circuit, reaching a best ranking of 419 in the world. She was a WTA Tour doubles quarter-finalist at the 1989 Belgian Open and made the singles main draw of the 1990 Athens Trophy. In 1991 she played in three Federation Cup ties for Hungary, which included a match against Magdalena Maleeva.

Finishing up on the tour in 1991, Schmitt then went to the United States to play college tennis for the USC Trojans, where she twice earned All-American honours.

=== Personal life ===
She is the daughter of Pál Schmitt, an Olympic fencer turned politician, who served as the President of Hungary from 2010 to 2012, and Katalin Makray, an Olympic artistic gymnast.

== ITF finals ==
=== Doubles (0-1) ===
Result	Date	Tournament	Surface	Partner	Opponents	Score
Loss	30 November 1987	Budapest, Hungary	Clay	(West Germany) Caroline Schneider	(Sweden) Catrin Jexell (Sweden) Monica Lundqvist	3–6, 2–6

== See also ==
- List of Hungary Fed Cup team representatives
