= 1977 Colgate Brazil Open – Singles =

Singles
- 1977 Colgate Brazil Open

Final
- Champion: (United States) Billie Jean King
- Runner-up: (Netherlands) Betty Stöve
- Score: 6–1, 6–4

Details
- Draw: 32
- Seeds: 8

Events
Singles	Doubles
- WTA Brasil Open

Billie Jean King won the 1977 Colgate Brazil Open singles title, defeating Betty Stöve in the final, 6–1, 6–4.

== Seeds ==
1. (United States) Martina Navratilova (quarterfinals)
2. (Netherlands) Betty Stöve (final)
3. (United States) Rosie Casals (quarterfinals)
4. (Australia) Dianne Balestrat (semifinals)
5. (Australia) Kerry Reid (semifinals)
6. (United States) Billie Jean King (champion)
7. (Australia) Wendy Turnbull (first round)
8. (United States) Kristien Shaw (second round)

== Draw ==
Key

- Q = Qualifier
- WC = Wild card
- LL = Lucky loser
- Alt = Alternate
- ITF = ITF entry
- PR = Protected ranking
- SR = Special ranking
- SE = Special exempt
- JE = Junior exempt
- JR = Junior Accelerator Programme entrant
- CO = College Accelerator Programme entrant
- NG = Next Gen Accelerator Program entrant
- w/o = Walkover
- r = Retired
- d = Defaulted

First Round
1	(United States) M. Navratilova	7	7
Q	(United States) R. Richards	6	6
(Germany) I. Riedel	6	3	0
(United States) L. duPont	4	6	6
6	(United States) B. J. King	6	6
(Romania) F. Mihai	2	4
(Czechoslovakia) R. Tomanová	7	6
(Romania) V. Ruzici	5	1
4	(Australia) D. Fromholtz	6	6
Q	(United States) M. Struthers	2	2
(Uruguay) F. Bonicelli	7	6
(Brazil) G. Langela	5	1
7	(Australia) W. Turnbull	5	2
(Australia) H. Cawley	7	6
(United States) B. Nagelsen	1	6	6
Q	(United States) B. Bruning	6	4	0
(France) F. Dürr	1	0
(United States) T. Holladay	6	6
(United States) J. Russell	1	2
5	(Australia) K. Reid	6	6
(United States) P. Teeguarden	3	7	6
(United States) M. Harper	6	5	1
Q	(United States) C.-A. Thomas	3	2
3	(United States) R. Casals	6	6
(Brazil) P. Medrado	1	3
(United States) S. Walsh	6	6
(Australia) C. Doerner	5	6	0r
8	(United States) K. Shaw	7	2	1
(Brazil) M. Bueno	6	6
(Germany) K. Ebbinghaus	0	2
(United States) J. Anthony	6	3	4
2	(Netherlands) B. Stöve	3	6	6

Second Round
1	(United States) M. Navratilova	6	6
(United States) L. duPont	3	1
6	(United States) B. J. King	6	6
(Czechoslovakia) R. Tomanová	2	0
4	(Australia) D. Fromholtz	6	6
(Uruguay) F. Bonicelli	1	2
(Australia) H. Cawley	6	0	5
(United States) B. Nagelsen	4	6	7
(United States) T. Holladay	1	0	r
5	(Australia) K. Reid	6	1
(United States) P. Teeguarden	6	5
3	(United States) R. Casals	7	7
(United States) S. Walsh	3	6	7
8	(United States) K. Shaw	6	3	5
(Brazil) M. Bueno	3	0
2	(Netherlands) B. Stöve	6	6

Quarterfinals
1	(United States) M. Navratilova	2	6	4
6	(United States) B. J. King	6	3	6
4	(Australia) D. Fromholtz	6	6
(United States) B. Nagelsen	3	3
5	(Australia) K. Reid	4	6	6
3	(United States) R. Casals	6	2	4
(United States) S. Walsh	2	1
2	(Netherlands) B. Stöve	6	6

Semifinals
6	(United States) B. J. King	6	6
4	(Australia) D. Fromholtz	3	3
5	(Australia) K. Reid	4	6	1
2	(Netherlands) B. Stöve	6	3	6

Final
6	(United States) B. J. King	6	6
2	(Netherlands) B. Stöve	1	4
