= Hélène Pelletier =

Canadian tennis player

- Country (sports): Canada
- Born: January 2, 1959 (age 67) Charlesbourg, Québec
- Prize money: $23,465

Singles
- Career record: 2–8
- Career titles: 0

Grand Slam singles results
- Wimbledon: 1R (1984)

Doubles
- Career record: 6–17
- Career titles: 1

Grand Slam doubles results
- Australian Open: 1R (1984)
- French Open: 3R (1984)
- Wimbledon: 1R (1985)
- US Open: 1R (1985)
Medal record
Representing Canada
Pan American Games
Silver medal – second place	1979 San Juan	Doubles
Bronze medal – third place	1979 San Juan	Mixed doubles
Summer Universiade
Bronze medal – third place	1979 Mexico City	Mixed doubles

Hélène Pelletier (born January 2, 1959) is a Canadian former professional tennis player.

== Biography ==
Born in Charlesbourg, Pelletier showed talent in water skiing as a child and only took up tennis at the age of 14. She trained for a short time at the Hopman Academy in Florida before injuring her ankle and played tennis for Rollins College.

In 1979 she won a Pan American Games silver medal in women's doubles and a mixed doubles bronze in Mexico City.

Pelletier played a total of 12 Federation Cup ties for Canada, from 1981 to 1985.

She was most prominent on the professional tour as a doubles player, often partnering Federation Cup teammate Jill Hetherington, with whom she won the 1984 Brasil Open in Rio de Janeiro and made the round of 16 at the 1984 French Open. The pair's biggest win was over Martina Navratilova and Gigi Fernández at the 1985 Virginia Slims of Florida.

As a singles player, her achievements including qualifying for the main draw of the 1984 Wimbledon Championships. She defeated Liz Smylie at the 1984 edition of the Canadian Open and won a Federation Cup match against Britain's Anne Hobbs in the same year.

Retiring due to injury in 1986, Pelletier went on to have a career in media. She started at radio station CKAC and since 1989 has been with Quebec sports broadcaster Réseau des sports (RDS).

== WTA career titles ==
=== Doubles (1) ===
Result	W/L	Date	Tournament	Surface	Partner	Opponents	Score
Win	1–0	Jul 1984	Brasil Tennis Cup	Hard	(Canada) Jill Hetherington	(United States) Penny Mager (United States) Kyle Copeland	6–3, 2–6, 7–6^{(9–7)}

== See also ==
- List of Canada Fed Cup team representatives
