= Kathleen Schuurmans =

- Country (sports): Belgium
- Born: 3 July 1966 (age 58)
- Prize money: $10,905

Singles
- Career record: 29–45
- Highest ranking: No. 326 (21 December 1986)

Grand Slam singles results
- French Open: Q1 (1985, 1986)

Doubles
- Career record: 13–26
- Highest ranking: No. 213 (18 July 1988)

Kathleen Gonzalez-Schuurmans (born 3 July 1966) is a Belgian former professional tennis player.

Active on the professional tour in the 1980s, Schuurmans had a career high singles ranking of 326 in the world and featured in qualifying draws at the French Open. She represented the Belgium Federation Cup team in 1984 and 1985, appearing in a total of six ties. In 1984, she put Belgium into the second round of the World Group when she teamed up with Nicole Mabille to win the deciding doubles tie against Colombia.

Schuurmans married Mexican Davis Cup player Alfonso González and lives in Mechelen, where she works as a pharmacists's assistant. She is also heavily involved in Belgian basketball, serving as team manager of women's division one team BC Castors Braine. Previously she was team manager for the men's and women's national teams.

== ITF finals ==
=== Doubles: 3 (1–2) ===
Result	No.	Date	Tournament	Surface	Partner	Opponents	Score
Win	1.	22 February 1987	Denain, France	Clay	(United States) Erika Smith	(France) Virginie Paquet (France) Karine Quentrec	6–3, 6–2
Loss	1.	16 August 1987	Koksijde, Belgium	Clay	(United Kingdom) Joy Tacon	(Belgium) Sabine Appelmans (Belgium) Caroline van Renterghem	7–6^{(2)}, 2–6, 6–7^{(3)}
Loss	2.	27 August 1989	Koksijde, Belgium	Clay	(Belgium) Caroline van Renterghem	(Netherlands) Pascale Druyts (Netherlands) Heleen Van Den Berg	2–6, 4–6
