= 1984 Santista Textile Open =

- Date: 9–15 July
- Edition: 2nd
- Category: Virginia Slims circuit
- Draw: 32S / 16D
- Prize money: $50,000
- Surface: Hard / outdoor
- Location: Rio de Janeiro, Brazil

Champions

Singles
- (Italy) Sandra Cecchini

Doubles
- (United States) Jill Hetherington / (Canada) Hélène Pelletier
- Santista Textile Open

The 1984 Santista Textile Open was a women's tennis tournament played on outdoor hard courts in Rio de Janeiro, Brazil that was part of the 1984 Virginia Slims World Championship Series. The tournament was held from 9 July through 15 July 1984. Second-seeded Sandra Cecchini won the singles title.

== Finals ==
=== Singles ===
(Italy) Sandra Cecchini defeated (Argentina) Adriana Villagrán-Reami 6–3, 6–3

- It was Cecchini's 2nd singles title of the year and of her career.

=== Doubles ===
(Canada) Jill Hetherington / (Canada) Hélène Pelletier defeated (United States) Penny Barg-Mager / (United States) Kyle Copeland 6–3, 2–6, 7–6

- It was Hetherington's 1st career title. It was Pelletier's only career title.
