= 1987 WTA Argentine Open =

- Date: 30 November – 6 December
- Edition: 2nd
- Category: 1
- Draw: 56S / 24D
- Prize money: $50,000
- Surface: Clay / outdoors
- Location: Buenos Aires, Argentina
- Venue: Buenos Aires Lawn Tennis Club

Champions

Singles
- (Argentina) Gabriela Sabatini

Doubles
- (Argentina) Mercedes Paz / (Argentina) Gabriela Sabatini
← 1986 ·	WTA Argentine Open	· 1988 →

The 1987 WTA Argentine Open was a women's tennis tournament played on outdoor clay courts at the Buenos Aires Lawn Tennis Club in Buenos Aires, Argentina and was part of the Category 1 tier of the 1988 Virginia Slims World Championship Series. The tournament ran from 30 November until 6 December 1987. First-seeded Gabriela Sabatini won the singles title.

== Finals ==
=== Singles ===
(Argentina) Gabriela Sabatini defeated (West Germany) Isabel Cueto 6–0, 6–2

- It was Sabatini's 3rd and last singles title of the year and the 5th of her career.

=== Doubles ===
(Argentina) Mercedes Paz / (Argentina) Gabriela Sabatini defeated (Canada) Jill Hetherington / (Switzerland) Christiane Jolissaint 6–2, 6–2

- It was Paz's 2nd title of the year and the 8th of her career. It was Sabatini's 4th title of the year and the 13th of her career.
