= Luciana Della Casa =

Brazilian tennis player

Luciana Della Casa (born 24 February 1971) is a former professional tennis player from Brazil.

She has career-high WTA rankings of 383 in singles, achieved on 26 November 1990, and 224 in doubles, reached on 17 July 1989.

She made her WTA Tour main-draw debut at the 1990 Brasil Tennis Cup.

== ITF finals ==
$25,000 tournaments
$10,000 tournaments

=== Doubles: 3 (0–3) ===
Result	No.	Date	Tournament	Surface	Partner	Opponents	Score
Loss	1.	31 October 1988	ITF Guarujá, Brazil	Clay	(Brazil) Cláudia Chabalgoity	(Netherlands) Carin Bakkum (Netherlands) Simone Schilder	6–0, 3–6, 4–6
Loss	2.	26 November 1989	ITF Santiago, Chile	Clay	(Italy) Giulia Toschi	(Denmark) Sofie Albinus (France) Noëlle van Lottum	2–6, 2–6
Loss	3.	27 October 1996	ITF Rio Grande do Sul, Brazil	Hard	(Brazil) Roberta Burzagli	(Brazil) Miriam D'Agostini (Brazil) Andrea Vieira	7–6, 3–6, 0–6
