= Natacha Marcucci =

Argentine tennis player

- Country (sports): Argentina
- Born: 26 September 1970 (age 55)
- Prize money: $11,363

Singles
- Career record: 28–32
- Career titles: 1 ITF
- Highest ranking: No. 234 (21 Dec 1987)

Doubles
- Career record: 12–23
- Highest ranking: No. 263 (1 Aug 1988)

Natacha Marcucci (born 26 September 1970) is an Argentine former professional tennis player. (Note: Tennis databases list her given name as Natasha but the correct spelling of her name is Natacha, according news sources.)

Marcucci, a native of San Juan, was ranked as high as nine in the world on the junior circuit.

While competing on the professional tour she had a career high singles ranking of 234 and won an ITF tournament in Rio de Janeiro in 1986. Her best performances on the WTA Tour were second round appearances at the 1987 Argentine Open and the 1988 Brasil Open.

== ITF finals ==
=== Singles: 2 (1–1) ===
Outcome	No.	Date	Tournament	Surface	Opponent	Score
Winner	1.	6 December 1986	ITF Rio de Janeiro, Brazil	Clay	(Brazil) Luciana Tella	6–4, 7–6
Runner-up	2.	2 September 1990	ITF Palermo, Italy	Clay	(Italy) Carmela Vitali	6–7, 4–6
