= Ilse de Ruysscher =

Belgian tennis player

- Country (sports): Belgium
- Born: 13 July 1962 (age 62)
- Prize money: $10,710

Singles
- Career record: 36–34
- Highest ranking: No. 308 (15 February 1988)

Doubles
- Career record: 10–19
- Highest ranking: No. 278 (15 February 1988)

Team competitions
- Fed Cup: 4–3

Ilse de Ruysscher (born 13 July 1962) is a Belgian former professional tennis player.

de Ruysscher has career-high WTA rankings of 308 in singles, achieved on 15 February 1988, and 278 in doubles, set on 15 February 1988. Playing for Belgium at the Fed Cup, de Ruysscher has accumulated a win–loss record of 4–3.

== ITF finals ==
$10,000 tournaments

=== Singles: 2 (0–2) ===
Result	No.	Date	Tournament	Surface	Opponent	Score
Loss	1.	16 February 1987	Denain, France	Clay	(Czechoslovakia) Regina Rajchrtová	1–6, 1–6
Loss	2.	4 January 1988	Johannesburg, South Africa	Hard	(South Africa) Linda Barnard	4–6, 3–6

=== Doubles: 1 (0–1) ===
Result	No.	Date	Tournament	Surface	Partner	Opponents	Score
Loss	1.	20 April 1987	London, United Kingdom	Hard	(United Kingdom) Valda Lake	(United Kingdom) Jo Louis (France) Frédérique Martin	1–6, 7–5, 4–6
