= Anabella Radics =

Spanish tennis player (born 1968)

- Country (sports): Argentina; Spain
- Born: 17 December 1968 (age 56)

Singles
- Highest ranking: No. 264 (14 Sep 1987)

Doubles
- Highest ranking: No. 239 (7 Dec 1987)

Anabella Radics (born 17 December 1968) is a Spanish former professional tennis player.

Radics, who is originally from Argentina, reached a career best singles ranking of 264. At WTA Tour level she made two main draw appearances at the Argentine Open, including in 1986 when she won through to the second round.
