= Cláudia Chabalgoity =

Brazilian tennis player (born 1971)

- Full name: Cláudia Silvia Chabalgoity
- Country (sports): Brazil
- Born: 13 March 1971 (age 55) Brasília, Brazil
- Plays: Right-handed
- Prize money: $68,832

Singles
- Career record: 100–70
- Career titles: 4 ITF
- Highest ranking: No. 121 (6 August 1990)

Doubles
- Career record: 43–41
- Career titles: 4 ITF
- Highest ranking: No. 102 (3 December 1990)

Grand Slam doubles results
- French Open: 1R (1991)
- US Open: 1R (1990)

Grand Slam mixed doubles results
- French Open: 1R (1991)

Cláudia Silvia Chabalgoity (born 13 March 1971) is a Brazilian former professional tennis player.

== Biography ==
Born in Brasília, Chabalgoity began playing tennis at the age of three. She has an elder brother, Carlos, who also played briefly on the pro tour.

Right-handed Chabalgoity began touring internationally in 1989 and won two ITF $25k titles that year, one at home in São Paulo and the other in the Spanish city of Pamplona. She had a best singles ranking of 121, attained in 1990. As a doubles player, she made it to 102 in the world and was runner-up in two WTA Tour tournaments. She appeared in the main draw of two Grand Slam events, the women's doubles at the 1990 US Open, then both the women's doubles and mixed doubles at the 1991 French Open.

During her career, she represented Brazil in several international competitions. As a member of the Brazil Fed Cup team, she featured in a total of six ties, all across 1990 and 1991 (overall record: 1–7). Her only win was in singles, against Bulgaria's Elena Pampoulova. At the 1991 Pan American Games in Havana, she was a gold medalist in the team competition, and also won silver medals in both the women's doubles and mixed doubles events. She competed for Brazil in the women's doubles tournament at the 1992 Summer Olympics, where she and partner Andrea Vieira won their first-round match against Sweden's Catarina Lindqvist and Maria Lindström, before being beaten by the bronze medal-winning Australian team in the second round.

She now runs a tennis school in Brasília for people with disabilities.

== WTA career finals ==
=== Doubles: 2 (2 runner-ups) ===
Result	Date	Tournament	Tier	Surface	Partner	Opponents	Score
Loss	Dec 1989	Brasil Open	Tier V	Hard	(Brazil) Luciana Corsato	(Argentina) Mercedes Paz (Argentina) Patricia Tarabini	2–6, 2–6
Loss	Oct 1993	Brasil Open	Tier IV	Clay	(Brazil) Andrea Vieira	(Germany) Sabine Hack (Germany) Veronika Martinek	2–6, 6–7

== ITF finals ==
$25,000 tournaments
$10,000 tournaments

=== Singles: 10 (4–6) ===
Result	No.	Date	Tournament	Surface	Opponent	Score
Loss	1.	16 July 1989	ITF Caserta, Italy	Clay	(Netherlands) Mara Eijkenboom	5–7, 7–5, 3–6
Win	1.	17 September 1989	ITF Pamplona, Spain	Clay	(Austria) Ulrike Priller	6–3, 6–3
Win	2.	10 December 1989	ITF São Paulo, Brazil	Clay	(Brazil) Luciana Corsato-Owsianka	6–1, 7–5
Loss	2.	25 March 1990	ITF Moulins, France	Carpet (i)	(Japan) Naoko Sawamatsu	3–6, 1–6
Loss	3.	2 April 1990	ITF Turin, Italy	Clay	(Austria) Sandra Dopfer	2–6, ret.
Loss	4.	14 May 1990	ITF Cascais, Portugal	Clay	(France) Catherine Mothes-Jobkel	3–6, 2–6
Win	3.	30 August 1992	ITF Querétaro, Mexico	Hard	(Venezuela) María Virginia Francesa	6–2, 6–3
Loss	5.	19 October 1992	ITF Buenos Aires, Argentina	Clay	(Argentina) Mariana Díaz Oliva	4–6, 6–2, 2–6
Win	4.	11 April 1993	ITF Athens, Greece	Clay	(Russia) Irina Zvereva	6–2, 4–6, 6–3
Loss	6.	19 July 1993	ITF Bilbao, Spain	Clay	(Spain) Neus Ávila	3–6, 0–6

=== Doubles: 7 (4–3) ===
Result	No.	Date	Tournament	Surface	Partner	Opponents	Score
Loss	1.	31 October 1988	ITF Guarujá, Brazil	Clay	(Brazil) Luciana Della Casa	(Netherlands) Carin Bakkum (Netherlands) Simone Schilder	6–0, 3–6, 4–6
Winner	1.	11 September 1989	ITF Pamplona, Spain	Hard	(Spain) Ana Segura	(Spain) Eva Bes (Spain) Virginia Ruano Pascual	6–3, 6–0
Win	2.	12 November 1990	ITF Porto Alegre, Brazil	Clay	(Brazil) Luciana Tella	(United States) Anne Grousbeck (Sri Lanka) Lihini Weerasuriya	6–1, 6–1
Win	3.	25 November 1990	ITF Florianópolis, Brazil	Clay	(Brazil) Christina Rozwadowski	(Brazil) Tatiana Buss (Brazil) Alessandra Kaul	6–0, 6–1
Loss	2.	13 April 1992	ITF Mexico City	Hard	(Mexico) Isabela Petrov	(Mexico) Lucila Becerra (Mexico) Xóchitl Escobedo	3–6, 2–6
Winner	4.	23 August 1992	ITF Cuernavaca, Mexico	Hard	(Mexico) Isabela Petrov	(South Africa) Estelle Gevers (South Africa) Liezel Huber	7–5, 5–7, 6–2
Loss	3.	15 November 1993	ITF La Plata, Argentina	Clay	(Paraguay) Larissa Schaerer	(Argentina) Laura Montalvo (Argentina) Mercedes Paz	1–6, 4–6
