= Pilar Vásquez =

Peruvian tennis player (born 1963)

- Full name: Pilar Vásquez
- Country (sports): Peru
- Born: 15 May 1963 (age 61); Lima, Peru
- Prize money: $232,790

Singles
- Career record: 199–259
- Highest ranking: No. 66 (30 April 1984)

Grand Slam singles results
- Australian Open: 2R (1989)
- French Open: 3R (1981)
- Wimbledon: 2R (1984)
- US Open: 4R (1983)

Doubles
- Career record: 32–102
- Highest ranking: No. 140 (25 June 1990)

Grand Slam doubles results
- Australian Open: 2R (1989)
- French Open: 3R (1984)
- US Open: 2R (1982)

Pilar Vásquez (born 15 May 1963) is a former professional tennis player from Peru.

== Biography ==
Vásquez, who was born in Lima, moved to the United States in the late 1970s and attended school in Miami. She made the girls' singles quarter-finals at the 1980 French Open as a junior. She also took part in the mixed doubles draw partnering with Belus Prajoux.

Vásquez competed on the WTA Tour from 1981. She was beaten by Martina Navratilova, at Haines City, in her first tournament. Vásquez managed to take the first set to a tiebreak. She made her Fed Cup debut in 1982, when Peru appeared in the World Group for the first time, and won a tie against Argentina. Vásquez made one final on the WTA Tour, at the 1982 Japan Open. She lost against her countrywoman, Laura Arraya, in three sets. Her best performance in a grand slam tournament was a fourth round appearance at the 1983 US Open. She was a semi-finalist at Bakersfield in 1983. Vásquez reached her highest ranking of 66 in the world in 1984. More semi-final appearances came at the Puerto Rico Open in 1987, and at the 1988 Rainha Cup in Guarujá. Vásquez retired as the most prolific player for Peru in terms of career wins. Vásquez had 16 Fed Cup appearances in her career.

She continues to live in Florida, and she works as a realtor.

== WTA Tour finals ==
=== Singles (0-1) ===
Result	Date	Tournament	Tier	Surface	Opponent	Score
Loss	October, 1982	Tokyo, Japan	$50,000	Hard	(Peru) Laura Arraya	6–3, 4–6, 0–6
