= Caroline van Renterghem =

Belgian tennis player

- Country (sports): Belgium
- Born: 31 January 1972 (age 53)
- Prize money: $8,911

Singles
- Career record: 20–18
- Career titles: 1 ITF
- Highest ranking: No. 261 (30 Jan 1989)

Doubles
- Career record: 13–12
- Career titles: 1 ITF
- Highest ranking: No. 384 (25 Sep 1989)

Caroline van Renterghem (born 31 January 1972) is a Belgian former professional tennis player.

A Federation Cup player for Belgium in 1988 and 1989, van Renterghem reached a career high singles ranking of 261 in the world. She featured twice in the main draw of the Belgian Open, including in 1988 when she was beaten in the first round by top seed Zina Garrison.

== ITF finals ==
=== Singles: 1 (1–0) ===
Result	No.	Date	Tournament	Surface	Opponent	Score
Win	1.	16 August 1987	Koksijde, Belgium	Clay	(Netherlands) Nathalie Van Dierendonck	6–1, 1–0 Ret

=== Doubles: 2 (1–1) ===
Result	No.	Date	Tournament	Surface	Partner	Opponents	Score
Win	1.	16 August 1987	Koksijde, Belgium	Clay	(Belgium) Sabine Appelmans	(Belgium) Kathleen Schuurmans (United Kingdom) Joy Tacon	6–7^{(2)}, 6–2, 7–6^{(3)}
Loss	2.	27 August 1989	Koksijde, Belgium	Clay	(Belgium) Kathleen Schuurmans	(Netherlands) Pascale Druyts (Netherlands) Heleen Van Den Berg	2–6, 4–6
