= Gisele Faria =

Brazilian tennis player

- Country (sports): Brazil
- Born: 16 August 1968 (age 57) Santos, São Paulo

Singles
- Career record: 14–23
- Career titles: 0
- Highest ranking: No. 353 (23 November 1987)

Doubles
- Career record: 34–27
- Career titles: 4 ITF
- Highest ranking: No. 163 (21 December 1987)

Grand Slam doubles results
- French Open: 1R (1988)

Gisele Faria (born 16 August 1968) is a Brazilian former professional tennis player.

Faria, who grew up in Santos, competed on the professional tour in the 1980s. She made her only Grand Slam main-draw appearance at the 1988 French Open, partnering Luciana Corsato in the women's doubles.

== ITF finals ==
=== Singles: 0–1 ===
Result	Date	Tournament	Surface	Opponent	Score
Loss	6 September 1987	ITF Caracas, Venezuela	Clay	(Brazil) Andrea Vieira	6–7^{(5)}, 3–6

=== Doubles: 4–0 ===
Result	No.	Date	Tournament	Surface	Partner	Opponents	Score
Win	1.	6 December 1986	ITF Rio de Janeiro, Brazil	Clay	(Brazil) Adriana Florido	(Brazil) Luciana Tella (Brazil) Claudia Tella	4–6, 7–6, 6–2
Win	2.	26 October 1987	ITF Rio de Janeiro, Brazil	Clay	(Brazil) Niege Dias	(Brazil) Lucia Peria (Cuba) Belkis Rodríguez	6–3, 6–2
Win	3.	25 September 1988	ITF Medellín, Colombia	Clay	(Brazil) Luciana Tella	(Denmark) Henriette Kjær Nielsen (Denmark) Anja Michailoff	0–6, 6–4, 6–3
Win	4.	2 October 1988	ITF Bogotá, Colombia	Clay	(Brazil) Luciana Tella	(United States) Paloma Collantes (Brazil) Alessandra Kaul	1–6, 6–3, 6–1
