= Cheryl Jones =

American tennis player

- Country (sports): United States
- Born: May 3, 1964 (age 60)
- Prize money: $28,929

Singles
- Highest ranking: No. 250 (September 28, 1987)

Doubles
- Career titles: 1 WTA
- Highest ranking: No. 91 (November 7, 1988)

Grand Slam doubles results
- French Open: 1R (1988)
- Wimbledon: 1R (1988)
- US Open: 1R (1988)

Cheryl Jones (born May 3, 1964) is an American former professional tennis player.

== Biography ==
Jones played college tennis for the USC Trojans in 1983 and 1984, then joined the professional tour. As a doubles player she reached a best world ranking of 91 and won one WTA Tour title, the 1987 Brasil Open, partnering Katrina Adams. In 1988 she featured in the main draw of the women's doubles at the French Open, Wimbledon and US Open.

From 1989 to 1995, Jones was the women's tennis head coach of the USC Trojans. She is the first African-American woman to have coached an NCAA Division I tennis team.

== WTA Tour finals ==
=== Doubles (1–0) ===
Result	Date	Tournament	Surface	Partner	Opponents	Score
Win	Dec 1987	Guarujá	Hard	(United States) Katrina Adams	(Canada) Jill Hetherington (Argentina) Mercedes Paz	6–4, 4–6, 6–4
