= Silvia La Fratta =

Italian tennis player

- Country (sports): Italy
- Born: 5 November 1967 (age 58)
- Plays: Right-handed
- Prize money: $74,190

Singles
- Career record: 76–66
- Career titles: 3 ITF
- Highest ranking: No. 114 (19 June 1989)

Grand Slam singles results
- French Open: 4R (1989)
- Wimbledon: 1R (1990)

Doubles
- Career record: 22–28
- Career titles: 1 ITF
- Highest ranking: No. 127 (19 June 1989)

Grand Slam doubles results
- French Open: 2R (1989)

Silvia La Fratta (born 5 November 1967) is a former professional tennis player from Italy.

== Biography ==
La Fratta, who was right-handed, had a best singles ranking of 114 and was a quarterfinalist at the 1988 Belgian Open.

In doubles, she was ranked as high as 127, with one WTA Tour final appearance at the 1988 Swedish Open, where she and Linda Ferrando were beaten by Sandra Cecchini and Mercedes Paz.

Her most notable achievement on tour was reaching the round of 16 as a qualifier at the 1989 French Open. She had wins over Gigi Fernández, Elna Reinach and Andrea Vieira, and then was eliminated by top seed Steffi Graf. This was her first Grand Slam main-draw appearance. She played in only two more Grand Slam events: the French Open and Wimbledon in 1990.

In the last years, she became a partner in Deloitte Italy.

== WTA career finals ==
=== Doubles: 1 (runner-up) ===
Result	Date	Tournament	Tier	Surface	Partner	Opponents	Score
Loss	4 July 1988	Båstad, Sweden	Tier 1	Clay	(Italy) Linda Ferrando	(Italy) Sandra Cecchini (Argentina) Mercedes Paz	0–6, 2–6

== ITF finals ==
=== Singles: 3 (3 titles) ===
Result	Date	Tournament	Surface	Opponent	Score
Win	14 July 1986	ITF Paliano, Italy	Clay	(France) Isabelle Crudo	6–1, 6–2
Win	22 September 1986	ITF Bol, Yugoslavia	Clay	(Czechoslovakia) Denisa Krajčovičová	6–1, 6–3
Win	7 March 1988	ITF Valencia, Spain	Clay	(France) Catherine Mothes-Jobkel	6–2, 6–2

=== Doubles: 1 (1 title) ===
Result	Date	Tournament	Surface	Partner	Opponents	Score
Win	22 September 1986	ITF Bol, Yugoslavia	Clay	(Italy) Barbara Romanò	(Czechoslovakia) Denisa Krajčovičová (Czechoslovakia) Alice Noháčová	7–5, 6–3
