= Simone Schilder =

Dutch tennis player

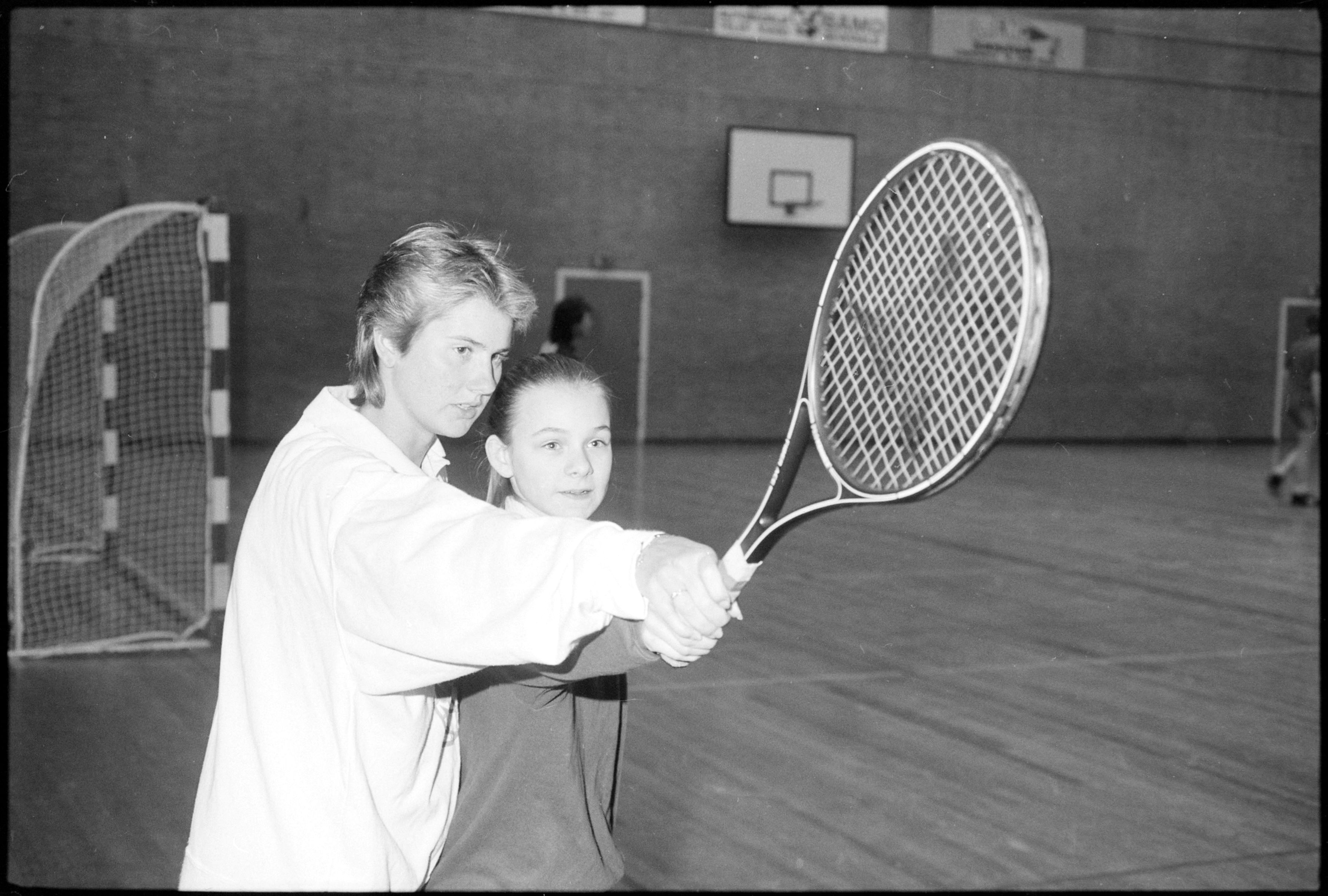
- Country (sports): Netherlands
- Born: 7 April 1967 (age 59) Netherlands
- Prize money: $56,529

Singles
- Career record: 78–86
- Career titles: 2 ITF
- Highest ranking: No. 164 (4 July 1988)

Grand Slam singles results
- Australian Open: 1R (1989)
- French Open: Q1 (1987, 1988)
- French Open Junior: 1R (1984, 1985)
- Wimbledon Junior: 1R (1984)
- US Open Junior: 3R (1985)

Other tournaments
- Olympic Games: 1R (1984)

Doubles
- Career record: 105–65
- Career titles: 8 ITF
- Highest ranking: No. 71 (14 August 1989)

Grand Slam doubles results
- French Open: 1R (1988, 1990)

Team competitions
- Fed Cup: 1–3

Simone Schilder (born 7 April 1967) is a former Dutch tennis player. She won a total of two singles and eight doubles ITF titles in her career. On 4 July 1988, she reached a singles ranking high of world No. 164. On 14 August 1989, she peaked at No. 71 in the doubles rankings.

At the age of 17, Schilder became the 1984 French Open girls' doubles champion and represented the Netherlands at the 1984 Summer Olympics.

== WTA career finals ==
=== Doubles: 2 (2 runner-ups) ===
Result	W-L	Date	Tournament	Surface	Partner	Opponents	Score
Loss	0–1	Nov 1988	Brasil Open	Hard	(Netherlands) Carin Bakkum	(Argentina) Bettina Fulco (Argentina) Mercedes Paz	3–6, 4–6
Loss	0–2	Jul 1989	Belgian Open	Clay	(Netherlands) Carin Bakkum	(Netherlands) Manon Bollegraf (Argentina) Mercedes Paz	1–6, 2–6

== ITF finals ==
$100,000 tournaments
$75,000 tournaments
$50,000 tournaments
$25,000 tournaments
$10,000 tournaments

=== Singles (2–0) ===
Result	No.	Date	Tournament	Surface	Opponent	Score
Win	1.	21 July 1986	ITF Amersfoort, Netherlands	Clay	(United Kingdom) Michelle Beltgens	6–2, 6–4
Win	2.	17 November 1986	ITF Croydon, United Kingdom	Carpet (i)	(France) Karine Quentrec	6–4, 6–4

=== Doubles (8–9) ===
Result	No.	Date	Tournament	Surface	Partner	Opponents	Score
Win	1.	9 June 1986	ITF Lyon, France	Clay	(Netherlands) Nicole Muns-Jagerman	(Czechoslovakia) Denisa Krajčovičová (Hungary) Réka Szikszay	7–5, 6–4
Win	2.	21 July 1986	ITF Amersfoort, Netherlands	Clay	(Netherlands) Ingelise Driehuis	(United Kingdom) Kaye Hand (United Kingdom) Valda Lake	6–1, 4–6, 6–0
Loss	3.	17 November 1986	ITF Croydon, United Kingdom	Carpet (i)	(Netherlands) Digna Ketelaar	(United Kingdom) Kaye Hand (United Kingdom) Valda Lake	6–7, 6–2, 5–7
Loss	4.	27 April 1987	ITF Taranto, Italy	Clay	(United Kingdom) Clare Wood	(Soviet Union) Leila Meskhi (Soviet Union) Natasha Zvereva	3–6, 2–6
Loss	5.	21 March 1988	ITF Bayonne, France	Hard	(Netherlands) Carin Bakkum	(France) Pascale Paradis (France) Catherine Tanvier	6–4, 2–6, 4–6
Win	6.	3 October 1988	ITF Eastbourne, United Kingdom	Hard (i)	(Netherlands) Carin Bakkum	(United Kingdom) Valda Lake (United Kingdom) Anne Simpkin	6–4, 6–4
Win	7.	10 October 1988	ITF Telford, United Kingdom	Hard	(Netherlands) Carin Bakkum	(United Kingdom) Belinda Borneo (United Kingdom) Sarah Sullivan	7–6^{(4)}, 6–0
Win	8.	31 October 1988	ITF Guarujá, Brazil	Clay	(Netherlands) Carin Bakkum	(Brazil) Cláudia Chabalgoity (Brazil) Luciana Della Casa	0–6, 6–3, 6–4
Win	9.	13 November 1989	ITF Telford, United Kingdom	Hard	(Finland) Anne Aallonen	(South Africa) Linda Barnard (South Africa) Lise Gregory	6–3, 7–6
Win	10.	4 December 1989	ITF São Paulo, Brazil	Clay	(Finland) Anne Aallonen	(Brazil) Luciana Tella (Brazil) Andrea Vieira	7–5, 6–4
Loss	11.	14 May 1990	ITF Cascais, Portugal	Clay	(Netherlands) Caroline Vis	(Spain) Eva Bes (Spain) Virginia Ruano Pascual	6–3, 2–6, 1–6
Loss	12.	2 July 1990	ITF Brindisi, Italy	Clay	(United States) Jennifer Fuchs	(France) Mary Pierce (France) Sandrine Testud	1–6, 6–1, 0–6
Loss	13.	16 July 1990	ITF Darmstadt, Germany	Clay	(Argentina) Andrea Tiezzi	(Soviet Union) Agnese Blumberga (Soviet Union) Eugenia Maniokova	4–6, 4–6
Loss	14.	1 October 1990	ITF York, United States	Hard	(Netherlands) Caroline Vis	(United States) Louise Allen (France) Sophie Amiach	6–7, 4–6
Loss	15.	22 April 1991	ITF Ramat HaSharon, Israel	Hard	(Finland) Anne Aallonen	(United Kingdom) Julie Salmon (Israel) Ilana Berger	4–6, 4–6
Loss	16.	24 June 1991	ITF Ronneby, Sweden	Clay	(Sweden) Jonna Jonerup	(United States) Jessica Emmons (Sweden) Maria Lindström	6–3, 2–6, 4–6
Win	17.	30 March 1992	ITF Moulins, France	Clay	(Netherlands) Ingelise Driehuis	(Czech Republic) Petra Kučová (Czech Republic) Eva Martincová	6–4, 7–5

== See also ==
- List of French Open champions
