= Luanne Spadea =

American tennis player

- Full name: Luanne Spadea-Nachmann
- Country (sports): United States
- Born: December 28, 1972 (age 52)
- Height: 5 ft 6 in (168 cm)
- Prize money: $102,918

Singles
- Career record: 78–101
- Highest ranking: No. 171 (August 6, 1990)

Doubles
- Career record: 27–62
- Highest ranking: No. 98 (April 9, 1990)

Grand Slam doubles results
- French Open: 1R (1988, 1990)
- Wimbledon: 1R (1988, 1991)
- US Open: 2R (1990)

Luanne Spadea-Nachmann (born December 28, 1972) is a former professional tennis player from the United States.

== Biography ==
Spadea, who grew up in Boca Raton, Florida, is the elder sister of tennis player Vince Spadea. Her mother Hilda is Colombian and she is of Italian descent on her father's side.

While still a junior she began competing in WTA Tour main draws late in 1987, aged 14. In 1989, Spadea was the Orange Bowl (18 & Under) champion, her third Orange Bowl title, having earlier won the event in the 12s and 14s age divisions. She won her first ITF title in 1990 in Key Biscayne, an $25,000 event.

On the WTA Tour, she achieved her biggest success as a doubles player, reaching a career-high doubles ranking of 98 in the world. She was a doubles finalist at São Paulo in 1990 partnering Mary Pierce and the following year made the singles quarter-finals of the same tournament. All of her grand slam main draw appearances were in women's doubles.

After finishing up on tour in 1994 she played collegiate tennis for Duke University. She played alongside sister Diana while at Duke and in 1997 earned All-American honours.

Married to Marc Nachmann, Spadea lives in Florida with son Alec and daughter Elle, who are junior golfers.

== WTA Tour finals ==
=== Doubles (0–1) ===
Result	Date	Tournament	Tier	Surface	Partner	Opponents	Score
Loss	Nov 1990	São Paulo, Brazil	Tier V	Clay	(France) Mary Pierce	(Argentina) Bettina Fulco (Czechoslovakia) Eva Švíglerová	5–7, 4–6

Sporting positions
Preceded by (United States) Carrie Cunningham	Orange Bowl Girls' Singles Champion; Category: 18 and under 1989	Succeeded by (Spain) Pilar Pérez
