= Luciana Corsato-Owsianka =

Brazilian tennis player

- Country (sports): Brazil
- Born: 21 January 1966 (age 59)
- Prize money: $122,996

Singles
- Career record: 136–173
- Highest ranking: No. 134 (15 July 1991)

Grand Slam singles results
- French Open: 2R (1988)

Doubles
- Career record: 57–92
- Highest ranking: No. 119 (5 March 1990)

Grand Slam doubles results
- French Open: 2R (1985)
- US Open: 1R (1988, 1990)

Luciana Corsato-Owsianka (born 21 January 1966) is a former professional tennis player from Brazil.

== Biography ==
Corsato began competing on the professional tour in 1984.

Her best performance in a grand slam tournament was a second round appearance at the 1988 French Open, which she competed in as a lucky loser from qualifying.

In 1989 she was a doubles finalist at the WTA Tour event in Guaruja and made the quarter-finals of the singles at Taranto.

She had her best WTA Tour result in singles at São Paulo in 1990, when she made it through to the semi-finals, in a run which included a win over top seed Eva Švíglerová.

As a member of Brazil's Fed Cup team she featured in a total of seven ties. In a World Group play off tie against Argentina in 1991 she won her only singles match, over Patricia Tarabini.

Later settling in Germany, Corsato married local tennis coach Marek Owsianka.

== WTA Tour finals ==
=== Doubles (0-1) ===
Result	Date	Tournament	Tier	Surface	Partner	Opponents	Score
Loss	Dec 1989	Guarujá, Brazil	Tier V	Hard	(Brazil) Cláudia Chabalgoity	(Argentina) Mercedes Paz (Argentina) Patricia Tarabini	2–6, 2–6

== ITF finals ==
$25,000 tournaments
$10,000 tournaments

=== Singles (2–3) ===
Result	No.	Date	Tournament	Surface	Opponent	Score
Loss	1.	17 March 1985	Porto Alegre, Brazil	Clay	(Czechoslovakia) Lea Plchová	2–6, 1–6
Win	1.	20 July 1986	Schenectady, United States	Hard	(United States) Jennifer Fuchs	6–0, 6–4
Win	2.	12 October 1986	Medellín, Colombia	Clay	(Argentina) Andrea Tiezzi	3–6, 7–5, 6–3
Loss	2.	25 January 1987	San Antonio, United States	Clay	(United States) Melissa Brown	2–6, 2–6
Loss	3.	10 December 1989	São Paulo, Brazil	Clay	(Brazil) Cláudia Chabalgoity	1–6, 5–7

=== Doubles (2–2) ===
Result	No.	Date	Tournament	Surface	Partner	Opponents	Score
Win	1.	14 July 1985	Miramar, United States	Hard	(South Africa) Monica Reinach	(Australia) Jackie Masters (New Zealand) Michelle Parun	6–3, 4–6, 6–3
Loss	1.	4 August 1986	Chatham, United States	Hard	(Australia) Colleen Carney	(United States) Anne Grousbeck (Japan) Maya Kidowaki	3–6, 4–6
Win	2.	31 July 1989	Vigo, Spain	Clay	(France) Pascale Etchemendy	(Spain) Ana Larrakoetxea (Spain) Ninoska Souto	6–3, 6–1
Loss	2.	25 November 1991	Porto Alegre, Brazil	Clay	(Brazil) Andrea Vieira	(France) Sybille Niox-Château (Spain) Silvia Ramón-Cortés	4–6, 3–6
