= Carin Bakkum =

Dutch tennis player

- Country (sports): Netherlands
- Born: 25 July 1962 (age 63) Heemskerk, Netherlands
- Prize money: $150,183

Singles
- Career record: 111–138
- Career titles: 0 WTA, 2 ITF
- Highest ranking: No. 141 (27 March 1989)

Grand Slam singles results
- Australian Open: 2R (1990)
- French Open: Q2 (1986)
- Wimbledon: 1R (1989)
- US Open: Q1 (1988, 1989)

Doubles
- Career record: 120–98
- Career titles: 1 WTA, 12 ITF
- Highest ranking: No. 69 (22 June 1987)

Grand Slam doubles results
- Australian Open: 1R (1987, 1988, 1989, 1990, 1995)
- French Open: 2R (1987, 1989)
- Wimbledon: 2R (1992)
- US Open: 1R (1988, 1989)

Grand Slam mixed doubles results
- Australian Open: QF (1988)
- French Open: 3R (1991)
- Wimbledon: 2R (1988, 1991)
- US Open: —

Team competitions
- Fed Cup: 1–0

Carin Bakkum (born 25 July 1962) is a Dutch former tennis player. During her career, Bakkum won two ITF singles titles as well as one WTA and 11 ITF doubles titles. She reached a singles ranking high of world number 141 on 27 March 1989, and on 22 June 1987, she reached a doubles ranking high of world number 69.

== Career finals ==
=== Doubles (1 title, 4 runner-ups) ===
Result	W-L	Date	Tournament	Surface	Partner	Opponents	Score
Win	1.	Jul 1986	Perugia, Italy	Clay	(Netherlands) Nicole Jagerman	(Switzerland) Csilla Bartos-Cserepy (United States) Amy Holton	6–4, 6–4
Loss	1.	Nov 1988	Guarujá, Brazil	Hard	(Netherlands) Simone Schilder	(Argentina) Bettina Fulco (Argentina) Mercedes Paz	3–6, 4–6
Loss	2.	Jul 1989	Brussels, Belgium	Clay	(Netherlands) Simone Schilder	(Netherlands) Manon Bollegraf (Argentina) Mercedes Paz	1–6, 2–6
Loss	3.	Jul 1990	Båstad, Sweden	Clay	(Netherlands) Nicole Muns-Jagerman	(Argentina) Mercedes Paz (Denmark) Tine Scheuer-Larsen	3–6, 7–6^{(12–10)}, 2–6
Loss	4.	Jul 1990	Estoril, Portugal	Clay	(Netherlands) Nicole Muns-Jagerman	(Italy) Sandra Cecchini (Argentina) Patricia Tarabini	6–1, 2–6, 3–6

== ITF finals ==
=== Singles finals: (2–2) ===
$100,000 tournaments
$75,000 tournaments
$50,000 tournaments
$25,000 tournaments
$10,000 tournaments

Outcome	No.	Date	Tournament	Surface	Opponent	Score
Winner	1.	9 September 1985	Valencia, Spain	Clay	(Netherlands) Nicole Muns-Jagerman	6–3, 6–3
Winner	2.	18 November 1985	Cheshire, United Kingdom	Carpet	(Czechoslovakia) Jana Novotná	5–7, 6–3, 6–2
Runner-up	3.	29 June 1987	Mexico City, Mexico	Hard	(Argentina) Andrea Tiezzi	1–6, 5–7
Runner-up	4.	3 October 1988	Eastbourne, United Kingdom	Hard (i)	(Sweden) Cecilia Dahlman	6–7, 0–6

=== Doubles finals: (12–2) ===
Outcome	No	Date	Tournament	Surface	Partner	Opponents	Score
Winner	1.	16 September 1985	Mallorca, Spain	Clay	(Netherlands) Nicole Muns-Jagerman	(Spain) Ninoska Souto (Spain) Inmaculada Varas	6–4, 6–0
Winner	2.	12 May 1986	Lee-on-the-Solent, United Kingdom	Clay	(Netherlands) Nicole Muns-Jagerman	(France) Emmanuelle Derly (Netherlands) Hellas Ter Riet	7–6, 3–6, 6–1
Winner	3.	16 June 1986	Fayetteville, North Carolina, United States	Hard	(Netherlands) Manon Bollegraf	(Netherlands) Digna Ketelaar (Brazil) Themis Zambrzycki	6–3, 7–6^{(7–3)}
Winner	4.	14 July 1986	Landskrona, Sweden	Clay	(Netherlands) Nicole Muns-Jagerman	(Netherlands) Manon Bollegraf (Netherlands) Marianne van der Torre	4–6, 6–2, 6–2
Winner	5.	29 June 1987	Mexico City, Mexico	Hard	(Brazil) Themis Zambrzycki	(Mexico) Lucila Becerra (Mexico) Maluca Llamas	6–3, 6–4
Runner-up	6.	21 March 1988	Bayonne, France	Hard	(Netherlands) Simone Schilder	(France) Pascale Paradis (France) Catherine Tanvier	6–4, 2–6, 4–6
Winner	7.	3 October 1988	Eastbourne, United Kingdom	Hard (i)	(Netherlands) Simone Schilder	(United Kingdom) Valda Lake (United Kingdom) Anne Simpkin	6–4, 6–4
Winner	8.	10 October 1988	Telford, United Kingdom	Hard	(Netherlands) Simone Schilder	(United Kingdom) Belinda Borneo (United Kingdom) Sarah Sullivan	7–6^{(7–4)}, 6–0
Winner	9.	31 October 1988	Guarujá, Brazil	Clay	(Netherlands) Simone Schilder	(Brazil) Cláudia Chabalgoity (Brazil) Luciana Della Casa	0–6, 6–3, 6–4
Winner	10.	28 October 1991	Madeira, Portugal	Hard	(Germany) Meike Babel	(Spain) Rosa Bielsa (Spain) Janet Souto	6–3, 6–2
Winner	11.	20 April 1992	Ramat HaSharon, Israel	Hard	(Netherlands) Ingelise Driehuis	(Netherlands) Gaby Coorengel (Israel) Yael Segal	6–2, 6–1
Winner	12.	12 July 1993	Evansville, Indiana, United States	Hard	(Japan) Hiromi Nagano	(South Africa) Mareze Joubert (South Africa) Rene Mentz	6–2, 6–2
Winner	13.	1 August 1994	Munich, Germany	Clay	(Czech Republic) Helena Vildová	(Spain) Silvia Ramón-Cortés (Spain) Cristina Torrens Valero	7–6^{(7–4)}, 6–0
Runner-up	14.	29 August 1994	Istanbul, Turkey	Hard	(Netherlands) Maaike Koutstaal	(Czech Republic) Petra Kučová (Czech Republic) Lenka Němečková	2–6, 3–6
