= Mercedes Paz =

Argentine tennis player

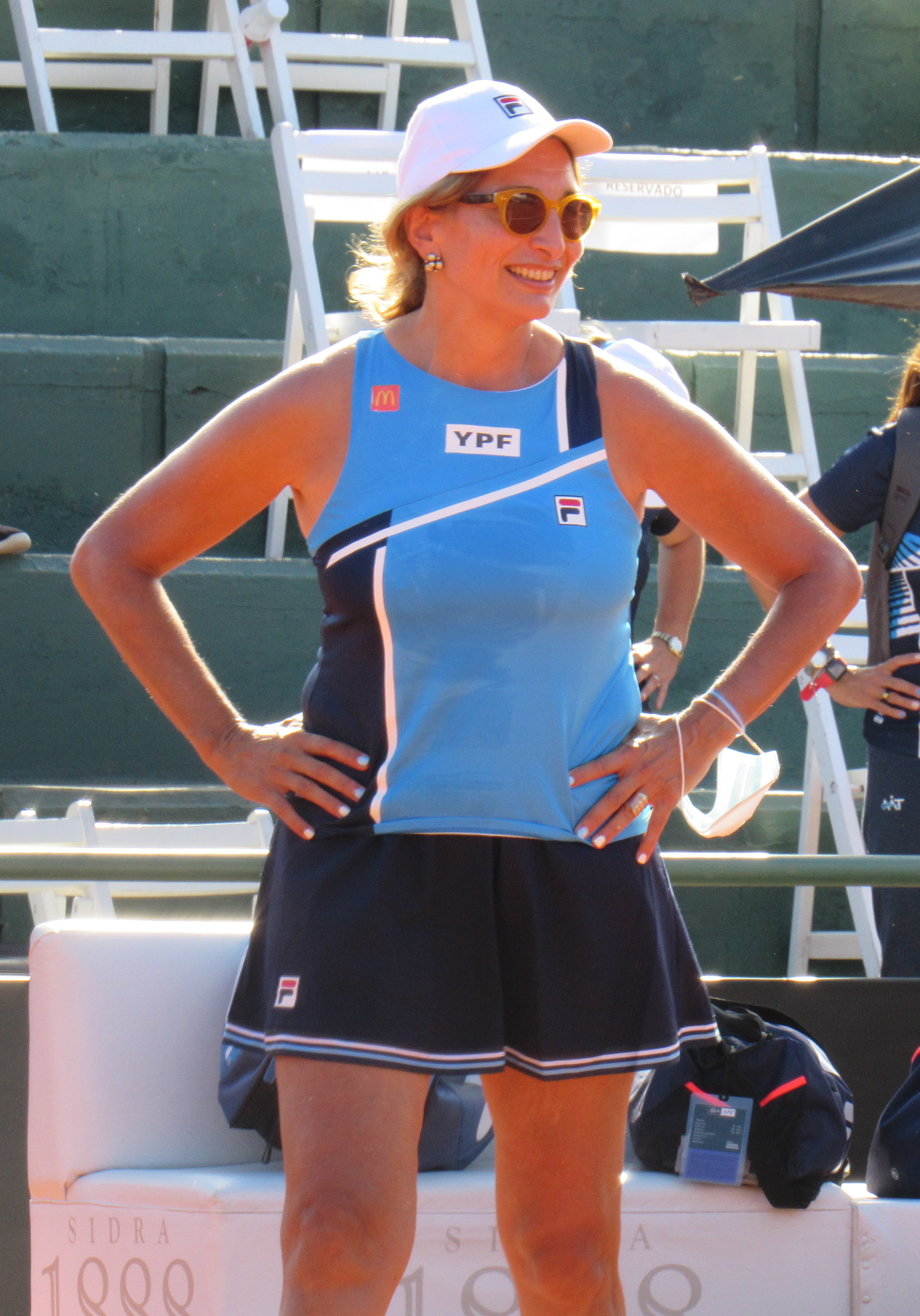
- Paz at the 2021 Billie Jean King Cup play-offs
- Country (sports): Argentina
- Residence: Tucumán, Argentina
- Born: 27 June 1966 (age 60) Tucumán
- Height: 1.80 m (5 ft 11 in)
- Turned pro: 1984
- Retired: 1998
- Plays: Right-handed (one-handed backhand)
- Prize money: $1,154,319

Singles
- Career record: 280–279
- Career titles: 3
- Highest ranking: No. 28 (29 April 1991)

Grand Slam singles results
- Australian Open: 1R (1991, 1992, 1995)
- French Open: 4R (1986, 1990)
- Wimbledon: 2R (1994, 1996)
- US Open: 2R (1985, 1987, 1988)

Other tournaments
- Olympic Games: 2R (1988)

Doubles
- Career record: 385–245
- Career titles: 22
- Highest ranking: No. 12 (24 September 1990)

Grand Slam doubles results
- Australian Open: 3R (1991, 1992)
- French Open: SF (1991)
- Wimbledon: QF (1990)
- US Open: SF (1991)

Other doubles tournaments
- Tour Finals: F (1990)
- Olympic Games: QF (1992)

Mixed doubles
- Career record: 24–28
- Career titles: 0

Grand Slam mixed doubles results
- Australian Open: QF (1991)
- French Open: QF (1988)
- Wimbledon: 3R (1995)
- US Open: F (1997)

Mercedes María Paz (Spanish pronunciation: [meɾˈseðes maˈɾi.a ˈpas]; born 27 June 1966) is a former professional tennis player from Argentina. She won three singles titles on the WTA Tour and reached a career-high ranking of world No. 28 in April 1991. Her best Grand Slam result was the fourth round at the 1986 French Open and the 1990 French Open.

== Career ==
Paz unexpectedly defeated defending champion Arantxa Sánchez Vicario in the second round of the 1990 French Open. Later that year, at the Virginia Slims of Worcester, Paz also defeated Sánchez Vicario in the round of 16. Five years before, in the semifinals of the 1985 Brazil Open, she beat top-seeded Gabriela Sabatini en route to beating Peruvian Laura Arraya for the title. In so doing, Paz became the first Argentinian woman to capture a major WTA event. In addition to wins over Sánchez Vicario and Sabatini, she also defeated top-seeded Jana Novotná in three sets to reach the semifinals of the Belgian Ladies Open in Brussels in 1989. The previous year, at the 1988 Hilton Head tournament, Paz had defeated Novotná in the round of 32 for the first time.

== WTA career finals ==
=== Singles 6 (3 titles, 3 runner-ups) ===
Legend
Virginia Slims (1–1)
Tier I (0–0)
Tier II (0–0)
Tier III (0–0)
Tier IV & V (2–2)

Result	W-L	Date	Tournament	Surface	Opponent	Score
Win	1–0	Mar 1985	São Paulo Open, Brazil	Clay	(Peru) Laura Arraya	5–7, 6–1, 6–4
Loss	1–1	Oct 1986	Singapore Open	Hard (i)	(United States) Gigi Fernández	6–4, 2–6, 6–4
Loss	1–2	Oct 1988	Puerto Rico Open	Hard	(Australia) Anne Minter	2–6, 6–4, 6–3
Win	2–2	Nov 1988	Guarujá Cup, Brazil	Hard	(Canada) Rene Simpson	7–5, 6–2
Loss	2–3	Jul 1989	Belgian Open	Clay	(Czechoslovakia) Radka Zrubáková	7–6^{(8–6)}, 6–4
Win	3–3	May 1990	Strasbourg, France	Clay	(United States) Ann Grossman	6–2, 6–3

=== Doubles 40 (22 titles, 18 runner-ups) ===
Legend
WTA Championships (0–1)
Virginia Slims (7–2)
Tier I (0–1)
Tier II (1–5)
Tier III (2–1)
Tier IV & V (12–8)

Result	No.	Date	Tournament	Surface	Partner	Opponents	Score
Win	1.	Oct 1984	Borden Classic, Japan	Hard	(United States) Ronni Reis	(Argentina) Emilse Raponi-Longo (Argentina) Adriana Villagrán	6–4, 7–5
Win	2.	Mar 1985	São Paulo Open, Brazil	Clay	(Argentina) Gabriela Sabatini	(Hungary) Csilla Bartos (Brazil) Niege Dias	7–5, 6–4
Win	3.	Aug 1985	VS New York, U.S.	Hard	(Argentina) Gabriela Sabatini	(Czechoslovakia) Kateřina Böhmová (Czechoslovakia) Andrea Holíková	5–7, 6–4, 6–3
Win	4.	Nov 1986	Puerto Rico Open	Hard	(United States) Lori McNeil	(United States) Gigi Fernández (United States) Robin White	6–2, 3–6, 6–4
Win	5.	Dec 1986	Argentine Open	Clay	(United States) Lori McNeil	(Netherlands) Manon Bollegraf (Netherlands) Nicole Muns-Jagerman	6–1, 2–6, 6–1
Loss	1.	Mar 1987	South Carolina Open, U.S.	Clay	(United States) Candy Reynolds	(Peru) Laura Arraya (Denmark) Tine Scheuer-Larsen	6–4, 6–4
Win	6.	Apr 1987	Family Circle Cup, U.S.	Clay	(West Germany) Eva Pfaff	(United States) Zina Garrison (United States) Lori McNeil	7–6^{(8–6)}, 7–5
Win	7.	Nov 1987	Argentine Open	Clay	(Argentina) Gabriela Sabatini	(Canada) Jill Hetherington (Switzerland) Christiane Jolissaint	6–2, 6–2
Loss	2.	Dec 1987	Brasil Open	Hard	(Canada) Jill Hetherington	(United States) Katrina Adams (United States) Cheryl Jones	6–4, 4–6, 6–4
Win	8.	Jul 1988	Swedish Open	Clay	(Italy) Sandra Cecchini	(Italy) Linda Ferrando (Italy) Silvia La Fratta	6–0, 6–2
Win	9.	Jul 1988	Belgian Open	Clay	(Denmark) Tine Scheuer-Larsen	(Bulgaria) Katerina Maleeva (Italy) Raffaella Reggi	7–6^{(7–3)}, 6–1
Win	10.	Nov 1988	Guarujá Cup, Brazil	Hard	(Argentina) Bettina Fulco	(Netherlands) Carin Bakkum (Netherlands) Simone Schilder	6–3, 6–4
Win	11.	May 1989	Ilva Trophy, Italy	Clay	(Socialist Federal Republic of Yugoslavia) Sabrina Goleš	(France) Sophie Amiach (France) Emmanuelle Derly	6–2, 6–2
Loss	3.	May 1989	Italian Open	Clay	(Netherlands) Manon Bollegraf	(Australia) Elizabeth Smylie (Australia) Janine Thompson	6–4, 6–3
Win	12.	May 1989	Internationaux de Strasbourg, France	Clay	(Austria) Judith Wiesner	(South Africa) Lise Gregory (United States) Gretchen Magers	6–3, 6–3
Loss	4.	Jul 1989	Arcachon Cup, France	Clay	(Netherlands) Brenda Schultz-McCarthy	(Italy) Sandra Cecchini (Argentina) Patricia Tarabini	6–3, 7–6^{(7–5)}
Win	13.	Jul 1989	Belgian Open	Clay	(Netherlands) Manon Bollegraf	(Netherlands) Carin Bakkum (Netherlands) Simone Schilder	6–1, 6–2
Win	14.	Jul 1989	Swedish Open	Clay	(Denmark) Tine Scheuer-Larsen	(Socialist Federal Republic of Yugoslavia) Sabrina Goleš (Bulgaria) Katerina Maleeva	6–2, 7–5
Win	15.	Dec 1989	Guarujá Cup, Brazil	Hard	(Argentina) Patricia Tarabini	(Brazil) Cláudia Chabalgoity (Brazil) Luciana Corsato	6–2, 6–2
Loss	5.	Apr 1990	Family Circle Cup, U.S.	Clay	(Soviet Union) Natasha Zvereva	(United States) Martina Navratilova (Spain) Arantxa Sánchez Vicario	6–2, 6–1
Win	16.	Apr 1990	Amelia Island Championships, U.S.	Clay	(Spain) Arantxa Sánchez Vicario	(Czechoslovakia) Regina Kordová (Hungary) Andrea Temesvári	7–6^{(7–5)}, 6–4
Win	17.	Apr 1990	Tampa Open, U.S.	Clay	(Spain) Arantxa Sánchez Vicario	(Peru) Laura Arraya (Italy) Sandra Cecchini	6–2, 6–0
Win	18.	Apr 1990	Barcelona Open, Spain	Clay	(Spain) Arantxa Sánchez Vicario	(Socialist Federal Republic of Yugoslavia) Sabrina Goleš (Argentina) Patricia Tarabini	6–7^{(7–9)}, 6–2, 6–1
Win	19.	Jul 1990	Swedish Open	Clay	(Denmark) Tine Scheuer-Larsen	(Netherlands) Carin Bakkum (Netherlands) Nicole Muns-Jagerman	6–3, 6–7^{(10–12)}, 6–2
Loss	6.	Aug 1990	LA Championships, U.S.	Hard	(Argentina) Gabriela Sabatini	(United States) Gigi Fernández (Czechoslovakia) Jana Novotná	6–3, 4–6, 6–4
Loss	7.	Oct 1990	Filderstadt Grand Prix, West Germany	Hard (i)	(Spain) Arantxa Sánchez Vicario	(United States) Mary Joe Fernández (United States) Zina Garrison	7–5, 6–3
Loss	8.	Nov 1990	WTA Championships, New York	Carpet (i)	(Spain) Arantxa Sánchez Vicario	(United States) Kathy Jordan (Australia) Elizabeth Smylie	7–6^{(7–4)}, 6–4
Loss	9.	Apr 1991	Amelia Island Championships, U.S.	Clay	(Soviet Union) Natasha Zvereva	(Spain) Arantxa Sánchez Vicario (Czechoslovakia) Helena Suková	4–6, 6–2, 6–2
Loss	10.	May 1991	Internationaux de Strasbourg, France	Clay	(Netherlands) Manon Bollegraf	(United States) Lori McNeil (United States) Stephanie Rehe	6–7^{(2–7)}, 6–4, 6–4
Loss	11.	Jul 1991	Internazionali di Palermo, Italy	Clay	(Italy) Laura Garrone	(Czechoslovakia) Petra Langrová (France) Mary Pierce	6–3, 6–7^{(5–7)}, 6–3
Loss	12.	Jul 1991	San Marino Open	Clay	(Italy) Laura Garrone	(Australia) Kerry-Anne Guse (Japan) Akemi Nishiya	6–0, 6–3
Loss	13.	Nov 1991	VS Indianapolis, U.S.	Hard (i)	(United States) Katrina Adams	(United States) Patty Fendick (United States) Gigi Fernández	6–4, 6–2
Win	20.	Dec 1991	São Paulo Open, Brazil	Clay	(Argentina) Inés Gorrochategui	(United States) Renata Baranski (United States) Laura Glitz	6–2, 6–2
Loss	14.	May 1992	Internationaux de Strasbourg, France	Clay	(United States) Lori McNeil	(United States) Patty Fendick (Czechoslovakia) Andrea Strnadová	6–3, 6–4
Loss	15.	Aug 1992	San Diego Open, U.S.	Hard	(Spain) Conchita Martínez	(Czechoslovakia) Jana Novotná (Latvia) Larisa Neiland	6–1, 6–4
Loss	16.	Apr 1993	Ilva Trophy, Italy	Clay	(Czech Republic) Petra Langrová	(United States) Debbie Graham (Netherlands) Brenda Schultz-McCarthy	6–0, 6–4
Loss	17.	Jul 1993	New Haven Open, U.S.	Hard	(Switzerland) Manuela Maleeva-Fragniere	(Australia) Elizabeth Smylie (Czech Republic) Helena Suková	6–1, 6–2
Win	21.	Jan 1994	Auckland Open, New Zealand	Hard	(Canada) Patricia Hy	(Australia) Jenny Byrne (Australia) Julie Richardson	6–4, 7–6^{(7–3)}
Win	22.	Apr 1995	Bol Open, Croatia	Clay	(Canada) Rene Simpson	(Italy) Laura Golarsa (Romania) Irina Spîrlea	7–5, 6–2
Loss	18.	Jul 1997	Internazionali di Palermo, Italy	Clay	(Argentina) Florencia Labat	(Italy) Silvia Farina Elia (Austria) Barbara Schett	2–6, 6–1, 6–4

=== Team competitions (1 title) ===
Result	No.	Date	Tournament	Surface	Partner	Opponents	Score
Win	1.	Mar 1995	Pan American Games, Mar del Plata	Clay	(Argentina) Patricia Tarabini	(United States) Ann Grossman (United States) Chanda Rubin	6–3, 6–2

=== Mixed doubles 1 (1 runner-up) ===
Result	No.	Date	Tournament	Surface	Partner	Opponents	Score
Loss	1.	Sep 1997	US Open	Hard	(Argentina) Pablo Albano	(Netherlands) Manon Bollegraf (United States) Rick Leach	6–3, 5–7, 6–7^{(3–7)}

== ITF Circuit finals ==
$75,000 tournaments
$50,000 tournaments
$25,000 tournaments
$10,000 tournaments

=== Singles (2–3) ===
Outcome	No.	Date	Tournament	Surface	Opponent	Score
Runner-up	1.	11 June 1984	ITF Lyon, France	Clay	(Bulgaria) Katerina Maleeva	6–7, 6–3, 2–6
Runner-up	2.	25 February 1985	ITF São Paulo, Brazil	Clay	(Sweden) Helena Dahlström	7–5, 4–6, 4–6
Winner	1.	10 March 1985	ITF Curitiba, Brazil	Clay	(United States) Renee Blount	6–1, 6–2
Winner	2.	1 April 1985	ITF Buenos Aires, Argentina	Clay	(Argentina) Mariana Pérez Roldán	6–3, 6–2
Runner-up	3.	30 September 1996	ITF Newport Beach, United States	Hard	(Ukraine) Elena Brioukhovets	2–6, 4–6

=== Doubles (9–3) ===
Outcome	No.	Date	Tournament	Surface	Partner	Opponents	Score
Runner-up	1.	29 January 1984	ITF Miami, United States	Hard	(United States) Ronni Reis	(United States) Heather Crowe (South Africa) Rene Mentz	4–6, 3–6
Winner	1.	11 June 1984	Lyon, France	Clay	(United States) Ronni Reis	(France) Isabelle Demongeot (France) Nathalie Tauziat	1–6, 6–3, 6–3
Winner	2.	15 November 1993	La Plata, Argentina	Clay	(Argentina) Laura Montalvo	(Brazil) Cláudia Chabalgoity (Paraguay) Larissa Schaerer	6–1, 6–4
Winner	3.	14 November 1994	Buenos Aires, Argentina	Clay	(Argentina) Laura Montalvo	(Slovakia) Patrícia Marková (Japan) Yuka Tanaka	6–4, 6–3
Winner	4.	25 February 1996	Bogotá, Colombia	Clay	(Greece) Christína Papadáki	(Hungary) Virág Csurgó (Czech Republic) Kateřina Kroupová-Šišková	7–6, 6–2
Winner	5.	30 September 1996	Newport Beach, United States	Hard	(Canada) Rene Simpson	(United States) Erika deLone (Australia) Nicole Pratt	6–3, 6–1
Runner-up	2.	20 October 1996	Hayward, United States	Hard	(Australia) Annabel Ellwood	(Canada) Jill Hetherington (United States) Kathy Rinaldi	5–7, 2–6
Runner-up	3.	23 February 1997	Bogotá, Colombia	Clay	(Argentina) Laura Montalvo	(Netherlands) Seda Noorlander (Greece) Christína Papadáki	6–7, 6–4, 5–7
Winner	6.	27 July 1997	Istanbul, Turkey	Hard	(Italy) Laura Golarsa	(Austria) Sylvia Plischke (Germany) Marlene Weingärtner	3–6, 6–3, 6–3
Winner	7.	5 October 1997	Buenos Aires, Argentina	Clay	(Argentina) Laura Montalvo	(Argentina) Celeste Contín (Argentina) Romina Ottoboni	4–6, 6–2, 6–4
Winner	8.	2 November 1997	Mogi das Cruzes, Brazil	Clay	(Argentina) Laura Montalvo	(Brazil) Miriam D'Agostini (Brazil) Vanessa Menga	6–2, 6–0
Winner	9.	27 September 1998	ITF Tucumán, Argentina	Clay	(Argentina) Patricia Tarabini	(Argentina) Luciana Masante (Argentina) Laura Montalvo	5–7, 6–4, 7–6

Awards
Preceded by (United States) Gretchen Rush	Karen Krantzcke Sportsmanship Award; 1990	Succeeded by (Austria) Judith Wiesner
