= 1988 Citizen Cup – Doubles =

Doubles
- 1988 Citizen Cup
- 1987 Champions: (West Germany) Claudia Kohde-Kilsch (Czechoslovakia) Jana Novotná

Final
- Champions: (Czechoslovakia) Jana Novotná (Denmark) Tine Scheuer-Larsen
- Runners-up: (West Germany) Andrea Betzner (Austria) Judith Wiesner
- Score: 6–4, 6–2

Details
- Draw: 28
- Seeds: 8

Events
Singles	Doubles
← 1987 ·	Hamburg European Open	· 1989 →

Claudia Kohde-Kilsch and Jana Novotná were the defending champions but only Novotná competed that year with Tine Scheuer-Larsen.

Novotná and Scheuer-Larsen won in the final 6–4, 6–2 against Andrea Betzner and Judith Wiesner.

== Seeds ==
Champion seeds are indicated in bold text while text in italics indicates the round in which those seeds were eliminated. The top four seeded teams received byes into the second round.

1. (Czechoslovakia) **Jana Novotná** / (Denmark) **Tine Scheuer-Larsen (champions)**
2. (Bulgaria) Katerina Maleeva / (Italy) Raffaella Reggi (semifinals)
3. (France) Nathalie Herreman / (Spain) Arantxa Sánchez (second round)
4. (West Germany) Andrea Betzner / (Austria) Judith Wiesner (final)
5. (Italy) Laura Garrone / (Socialist Federal Republic of Yugoslavia) Sabrina Goleš (second round)
6. (Netherlands) Nicole Jagerman / (Belgium) Sandra Wasserman (quarterfinals)
7. (Netherlands) Ingelise Driehuis / (Netherlands) Marcella Mesker (quarterfinals)
8. (Netherlands) Carin Bakkum / (Netherlands) Simone Schilder (quarterfinals)

== Draw ==
Key

- Q = Qualifier
- WC = Wild card
- LL = Lucky loser
- Alt = Alternate
- ITF = ITF entry
- PR = Protected ranking
- SR = Special ranking
- SE = Special exempt
- JE = Junior exempt
- JR = Junior Accelerator Programme entrant
- CO = College Accelerator Programme entrant
- NG = Next Gen Accelerator Program entrant
- w/o = Walkover
- r = Retired
- d = Defaulted

=== Final ===
Final

1
- (Czechoslovakia) **Jana Novotná**
- (Denmark) **Tine Scheuer-Larsen**
**6**
**6**

4
- (West Germany) Andrea Betzner
- (Austria) Judith Wiesner
4
2

=== Top half ===
First round

Second round

Quarterfinals

Semifinals

1
- (Czechoslovakia) **J Novotná**
- (Denmark) **T Scheuer-Larsen**
**6**
**6**

- (United States) L Spadea
- (Brazil) A Vieira
2
1

- (Brazil) L Corsato
- (Argentina) G Mosca
2
1

- (Brazil) **L Corsato**
- (Argentina) **G Mosca**
**6**
**6**

1
- (Czechoslovakia) **J Novotná**
- (Denmark) **T Scheuer-Larsen**
**6**
**6**

- (Italy) F Bonsignori
- (United Kingdom) S Loosemore
2
1

- (Brazil) N Dias
- (West Germany) W Probst
0
1

- (Brazil) **N Dias**
- (West Germany) **W Probst**
**6**
**6**

- (Brazil) **N Dias**
- (West Germany) **W Probst**
**7**
**6**

- (West Germany) V Martinek
- (Austria) B Paulus
2
3

5
(Italy) L Garrone
(Socialist Federal Republic of Yugoslavia) S Goleš
6
1

5
(Italy) **L Garrone**
(Socialist Federal Republic of Yugoslavia) **S Goleš**
**6**
**6**

1
- (Czechoslovakia) **J Novotná**
- (Denmark) **T Scheuer-Larsen**
**6**
2
**6**

- (Argentina) B Fulco
- (Argentina) A Villagrán
2
**6**
2

3
- (France) N Herreman
- (Spain) A Sánchez
3
6

- (West Germany) S Meier
- (West Germany) C Timm
3
1

- (Argentina) **B Fulco**
- (Argentina) **A Villagrán**
**6**
**7**

- (Argentina) **B Fulco**
- (Argentina) **A Villagrán**
**6**
**6**

- (Argentina) **B Fulco**
- (Argentina) **A Villagrán**
**6**
**6**

- (Czechoslovakia) H Fukárková
- (West Germany) P Wallenfels
**6**
4
6

8
- (Netherlands) C Bakkum
- (Netherlands) S Schilder
1
2

- (Czechoslovakia) **R Maršíková**
- (Czechoslovakia) **R Rajchrtová**
1
**6**
**7**

- (Czechoslovakia) R Maršíková
- (Czechoslovakia) R Rajchrtová
5
4

- (West Germany) K Hueffman
- (United States) G Kim
1
2

8
- (Netherlands) **C Bakkum**
- (Netherlands) **S Schilder**
**7**
**6**

8
- (Netherlands) **C Bakkum**
- (Netherlands) **S Schilder**
**6**
**6**

=== Bottom half ===
First round

Second round

Quarterfinals

Semifinals

7
- (Netherlands) **I Driehuis**
- (Netherlands) **M Mesker**
**6**
2
**6**

- (Italy) L Golarsa
- (Poland) I Kuczyńska
3
**6**
3

7
- (Netherlands) **I Driehuis**
- (Netherlands) **M Mesker**
**6**
**6**

- (West Germany) K Düll
- (West Germany) H Thoms
5
4

- (West Germany) V-K Elter
- (West Germany) E-M Schürhoff
3
1

- (West Germany) **V-K Elter**
- (West Germany) **E-M Schürhoff**
**7**
**6**

7
- (Netherlands) I Driehuis
- (Netherlands) M Mesker
**6**
0
4

- (West Germany) **I Cueto**
- (West Germany) **S Meier**
**6**
**6**

4
- (West Germany) **A Betzner**
- (Austria) **J Wiesner**
4
**6**
**6**

- (West Germany) S Menning
- (West Germany) T Weigl
2
4

- (West Germany) I Cueto
- (West Germany) S Meier
1
**6**
4

4
- (West Germany) **A Betzner**
- (Austria) **J Wiesner**
**6**
3
**6**

4
- (West Germany) **A Betzner**
- (Austria) **J Wiesner**
**6**
**6**

6
- (Netherlands) **N Jagerman**
- (Belgium) **S Wasserman**
4
**6**
**6**

2
- (Bulgaria) K Maleeva
- (Italy) R Reggi
4
2

- (Czechoslovakia) I Budařová
- (Czechoslovakia) R Zrubáková
**6**
2
0

6
- (Netherlands) **N Jagerman**
- (Belgium) **S Wasserman**
**7**
**6**

- (Australia) **L O'Neill**
- (Netherlands) **H ter Riet**
**7**
**6**

- (Australia) L O'Neill
- (Netherlands) H ter Riet
5
1

- (Czechoslovakia) M Frimmelová
- (Czechoslovakia) D Krajčovičová
6
4

6
- (Netherlands) N Jagerman
- (Belgium) S Wasserman
**6**
5
6

- (France) M-C Calleja
- (West Germany) S Frankl
3
3

2
- (Bulgaria) **K Maleeva**
- (Italy) **R Reggi**
2
**7**
**7**

- (West Germany) **S Auer**
- (Austria) **P Huber**
**6**
**6**

- (West Germany) S Auer
- (Austria) P Huber
0
4

2
- (Bulgaria) **K Maleeva**
- (Italy) **R Reggi**
**6**
**6**
