= 1988 Citizen Cup – Singles =

Singles
- 1988 Citizen Cup
- 1987 Champion: (West Germany) Steffi Graf

Final
- Champion: (West Germany) Steffi Graf
- Runner-up: (Bulgaria) Katerina Maleeva
- Score: 6–4, 6–2

Details
- Draw: 56
- Seeds: 16

Events
Singles	Doubles
← 1987 ·	Citizen Cup	· 1989 →

Steffi Graf was the defending champion and won in the final 6–4, 6–2 against Katerina Maleeva.

== Seeds ==
A champion seed is indicated in bold text while text in italics indicates the round in which that seed was eliminated. The top eight seeds received a bye to the second round.

1. (West Germany) **Steffi Graf (champion)**
2. (Bulgaria) Katerina Maleeva (final)
3. (West Germany) Sylvia Hanika (third round)
4. (Italy) Sandra Cecchini (quarterfinals)
5. (Spain) Arantxa Sánchez (third round)
6. (Italy) Raffaella Reggi (quarterfinals)
7. (West Germany) Isabel Cueto (quarterfinals)
8. (Argentina) Bettina Fulco (semifinals)
9. (Austria) Judith Wiesner (first round)
10. (Brazil) Neige Dias (third round)
11. (Czechoslovakia) Jana Novotná (third round)
12. (Austria) Barbara Paulus (third round)
13. (Socialist Federal Republic of Yugoslavia) Sabrina Goleš (third round)
14. (Czechoslovakia) Radka Zrubáková (semifinals)
15. n/a
16. n/a

== Draw ==
Key

- Q = Qualifier
- WC = Wild card
- LL = Lucky loser
- Alt = Alternate
- ITF = ITF entry
- PR = Protected ranking
- SR = Special ranking
- SE = Special exempt
- JE = Junior exempt
- JR = Junior Accelerator Programme entrant
- CO = College Accelerator Programme entrant
- NG = Next Gen Accelerator Program entrant
- w/o = Walkover
- r = Retired
- d = Defaulted

=== Finals ===
Semifinals
1	(West Germany) **Steffi Graf**	**6**	**6**
8	(Argentina) Bettina Fulco	2	3
14	(Czechoslovakia) Radka Zrubáková	**6**	1	1
2	(Bulgaria) **Katerina Maleeva**	2	**6**	**6**

Final
1	(West Germany) **Steffi Graf**	**6**	**6**
2	(Bulgaria) Katerina Maleeva	4	2

=== Top half ===
==== Section 1 ====
First round
(Czechoslovakia) **R Maršíková**	**6**	3	**7**
(Czechoslovakia) M Frimmelová	4	**6**	6
(Denmark) T Scheuer-Larsen	5	5
(Italy) **L Golarsa**	**7**	**7**
(France) N Herreman	3	**6**	2
13	(Socialist Federal Republic of Yugoslavia) **S Goleš**	**6**	3	**6**
(Brazil) **A Vieira**	**6**	**6**
(Australia) L O'Neill	4	3
(Netherlands) M Mesker	4	6
(United Kingdom) **S Loosemore**	**6**	**7**
(Czechoslovakia) **D Krajčovičová**	**7**	1	**6**
(France) S Niox-Chateau	6	**6**	4

Second round
1	(West Germany) **S Graf**	**6**	**6**
(Czechoslovakia) R Maršíková	0	3
(Italy) L Golarsa	2	3
13	(Socialist Federal Republic of Yugoslavia) **S Goleš**	**6**	**6**
(Brazil) **A Vieira**	5	**7**	**7**
(United Kingdom) S Loosemore	**7**	5	5
(Czechoslovakia) D Krajčovičová	4	4
6	(Italy) **R Reggi**	**6**	**6**

Third round
1	(West Germany) **S Graf**	**6**	**6**
13	(Socialist Federal Republic of Yugoslavia) S Goleš	4	2
(Brazil) A Vieira	2	1
6	(Italy) **R Reggi**	**6**	**6**

Quarterfinals
1	(West Germany) **S Graf**	**6**	**6**
6	(Italy) R Reggi	0	0

==== Section 2 ====
First round
(West Germany) **H Thoms**	**6**	2	**6**
(Poland) I Kuczyńska	2	**7**	2
(West Germany) **A Betzner**	**6**	3	**7**
(Brazil) L Corsato	3	**6**	6
(Italy) **L Garrone**	**6**	2	**7**
9	(Austria) J Wiesner	2	**6**	5
12	(Austria) **B Paulus**	**6**	**6**
(Italy) F Bonsignori	0	1
(West Germany) **P Wallenfels**	2	**6**	**6**
(West Germany) V Martinek	**6**	2	0
(Argentina) **A Villagrán**	**6**	4	**6**
(Netherlands) H ter Riet	3	**6**	0

Second round
4	(Italy) **S Cecchini**	**7**	**6**
(West Germany) H Thoms	6	1
(West Germany) A Betzner	**6**	5	4
(Italy) **L Garrone**	3	**7**	**6**
12	(Austria) **B Paulus**	**6**	**6**
(West Germany) P Wallenfels	1	4
(Argentina) A Villagrán	2	2
8	(Argentina) **B Fulco**	**6**	**6**

Third round
4	(Italy) **S Cecchini**	0	**7**	**6**
(Italy) L Garrone	**6**	5	1
12	(Austria) B Paulus	1	0
8	(Argentina) **B Fulco**	**6**	**6**

Quarterfinals
4	(Italy) S Cecchini	5	1
8	(Argentina) **B Fulco**	**7**	**6**

=== Bottom half ===
==== Section 3 ====
First round
(Belgium) **S Wasserman**	3	**7**	**6**
(Czechoslovakia) H Fukárková	**6**	5	4
(West Germany) **T Weigl**	**6**	**7**
(France) M-C Calleja	4	6
(Netherlands) C Bakkum	1	2
14	(Czechoslovakia) **R Zrubáková**	**6**	**6**
(United States) G Kim	6	1
(West Germany) **S Meier**	**7**	**6**
(Argentina) **G Mosca**	**6**	**6**
(West Germany) K Düll	0	2
(Austria) P Huber	2	2
(West Germany) **S Auer**	**6**	**6**

Second round
5	(Spain) **A Sánchez**	**6**	**7**
(Belgium) S Wasserman	3	5
(West Germany) T Weigl	4	5
14	(Czechoslovakia) **R Zrubáková**	**6**	**7**
(West Germany) **S Meier**	**6**	**6**
(Argentina) G Mosca	1	1
(West Germany) S Auer	1	2
3	(West Germany) **S Hanika**	**6**	**6**

Third round
5	(Spain) A Sánchez	2	3
14	(Czechoslovakia) **R Zrubáková**	**6**	**6**
(West Germany) **S Meier**	**6**	3	**6**
3	(West Germany) S Hanika	2	**6**	3

Quarterfinals
14	(Czechoslovakia) **R Zrubáková**	**6**	**6**
(West Germany) S Meier	2	1

==== Section 4 ====
First round
(West Germany) **W Probst**	**7**	**6**
(Italy) B Romanò	5	2
(Netherlands) S Schilder	**6**	4	1
(Norway) **A Jönsson**	3	**6**	**6**
(Netherlands) N Jagerman	1	1
10	(Brazil) **N Dias**	**6**	**6**
11	(Czechoslovakia) **J Novotná**	**6**	**6**
(West Germany) S Frankl	4	2
(Czechoslovakia) I Budařová	6	2
(Switzerland) **C Cohen**	**7**	**6**
(West Germany) S Menning	4	3
(Czechoslovakia) **R Rajchrtová**	**6**	**6**

Second round
7	(West Germany) **I Cueto**	**6**	**6**
(West Germany) W Probst	4	3
(Norway) A Jönsson	2	2
10	(Brazil) **N Dias**	**6**	**6**
12	(Czechoslovakia) **J Novotná**	**7**	**6**
(Switzerland) C Cohen	5	0
(Czechoslovakia) R Rajchrtová	2	1
2	(Bulgaria) **K Maleeva**	**6**	**6**

Third round
7	(West Germany) **I Cueto**	**6**	**6**
10	(Brazil) N Dias	4	3
12	(Czechoslovakia) J Novotná	3	1
2	(Bulgaria) **K Maleeva**	**6**	**6**

Quarterfinals
7	(West Germany) I Cueto	2	6
2	(Bulgaria) **K Maleeva**	**6**	**7**
