= 1989 Citizen Cup – Singles =

Singles
- 1989 Citizen Cup
- 1988 Champion: (West Germany) Steffi Graf

Final
- Champion: (West Germany) Steffi Graf
- Runner-up: (Czechoslovakia) Jana Novotná
- Score: Walkover

Details
- Draw: 56
- Seeds: 16

Events
Singles	Doubles
← 1988 ·	Citizen Cup	· 1990 →

Steffi Graf was the defending champion and won the final on a walkover against Jana Novotná.

== Seeds ==
A champion seed is indicated in bold text while text in italics indicates the round in which that seed was eliminated. The top eight seeds received a bye to the second round.

1. (West Germany) **Steffi Graf (champion)**
2. (Czechoslovakia) Helena Suková (second round)
3. (Bulgaria) Manuela Maleeva (third round)
4. (Spain) Arantxa Sánchez (semifinals)
5. (Italy) Sandra Cecchini (third round)
6. (Czechoslovakia) Jana Novotná (final)
7. (Sweden) Catarina Lindqvist (third round)
8. (West Germany) Sylvia Hanika (third round)
9. (Czechoslovakia) Radka Zrubáková (quarterfinals)
10. (Argentina) Bettina Fulco (semifinals)
11. (West Germany) Isabel Cueto (first round)
12. (France) Isabelle Demongeot (third round)
13. (Austria) Barbara Paulus (quarterfinals)
14. (France) Nathalie Tauziat (quarterfinals)
15. (Netherlands) Manon Bollegraf (first round)
16. (West Germany) Eva Pfaff (first round)

== Draw ==
Key

- Q = Qualifier
- WC = Wild card
- LL = Lucky loser
- Alt = Alternate
- ITF = ITF entry
- PR = Protected ranking
- SR = Special ranking
- SE = Special exempt
- JE = Junior exempt
- JR = Junior Accelerator Programme entrant
- CO = College Accelerator Programme entrant
- NG = Next Gen Accelerator Program entrant
- w/o = Walkover
- r = Retired
- d = Defaulted

=== Finals ===
Semifinals
1	(West Germany) **Steffi Graf**	**6**	**6**
10	(Argentina) Bettina Fulco	4	0
4	(Spain) Arantxa Sánchez	6	**6**	1
6	(Czechoslovakia) **Jana Novotná**	**7**	3	**6**

Final
1	(West Germany) **Steffi Graf**	**w/o**
6	(Czechoslovakia) Jana Novotná

=== Top half ===
==== Section 1 ====
First round
(West Germany) **S Hack**	**6**	**6**
(United Kingdom) J Salmon	4	1
(West Germany) V Martinek	3	1
(Brazil) **G Miró**	**6**	**6**
(Netherlands) **N Jagerman**	**7**	4	**6**
11	(West Germany) I Cueto	6	**6**	4
16	(West Germany) E Pfaff	5	2
(Australia) **R McQuillan**	**7**	**6**
(France) **N Guerrée**	**6**	**6**
(France) S Niox-Chateau	3	3
(France) **A Dechaume**	**7**	**6**
(West Germany) P Wallenfels	5	4

Second round
1	(West Germany) **S Graf**	**w/o**
(West Germany) S Hack
(Brazil) G Miró	1	3
(Netherlands) **N Jagerman**	**6**	**6**
(Australia) **R McQuillan**	**6**	**6**
(France) N Guerrée	1	1
(France) A Dechaume	4	2
5	(Italy) **S Cecchini**	**6**	**6**

Third round
1	(West Germany) **S Graf**	**7**	**6**
(Netherlands) N Jagerman	5	3
(Australia) **R McQuillan**	**6**	4	**7**
5	(Italy) S Cecchini	3	**6**	6

Quarterfinals
1	(West Germany) **S Graf**	**6**	**6**
(Australia) R McQuillan	1	0

==== Section 2 ====
First round
(France) **M-C Damas**	**6**	5	**7**
(West Germany) S Auer	0	**7**	5
(Australia) **J-A Faull**	**6**	**6**
(West Germany) S Frankl	3	2
(Poland) R Baranski	0	3
10	(Argentina) **B Fulco**	**6**	**6**
14	(France) **N Tauziat**	**6**	**6**
(Austria) P Huber	3	2
(West Germany) C Singer	1	1
(Argentina) **A Villagrán**	**6**	**6**
(Denmark) T Scheuer-Larsen	**6**	1	4
(Peru) **P Vásquez**	3	**6**	**6**

Second round
3	(Bulgaria) **M Maleeva**	**6**	**6**
(France) M-C Damas	2	3
(Australia) J-A Faull	4	2
10	(Argentina) **B Fulco**	**6**	**6**
14	(France) **N Tauziat**	**6**	**6**
(Argentina) A Villagrán	3	1
(Peru) P Vásquez	2	1
7	(Sweden) **C Lindqvist**	**6**	**6**

Third round
3	(Bulgaria) M Maleeva	5	3
10	(Argentina) **B Fulco**	**7**	**6**
14	(France) **N Tauziat**	**6**	**6**
7	(Sweden) C Lindqvist	1	4

Quarterfinals
10	(Argentina) **B Fulco**	**7**	**7**
14	(France) N Tauziat	5	6

=== Bottom half ===
==== Section 3 ====
First round
(Netherlands) C Bakkum	4	0
(Argentina) **P Tarabini**	**6**	**6**
(West Germany) **K Düll**	4	**7**	**6**
(Spain) I Varas	**6**	5	4
(Australia) L O'Neill	0	1
13	(Austria) **B Paulus**	**6**	**6**
15	(Netherlands) M Bollegraf	2	1
(South Africa) **A Coetzer**	**6**	**6**
(Austria) **P Ritter**	5	**6**	**6**
(West Germany) H Thoms	**7**	4	2
(Czechoslovakia) D Krajčovičová	0	2
(West Germany) **W Probst**	**6**	**6**

Second round
8	(West Germany) **S Hanika**	**6**	**6**
(Argentina) P Tarabini	3	1
(West Germany) K Düll	1	3
13	(Austria) **B Paulus**	**6**	**6**
(South Africa) A Coetzer	2	4
(Austria) **P Ritter**	**6**	**6**
(West Germany) W Probst	2	2
4	(Spain) **A Sánchez**	**6**	**6**

Third round
8	(West Germany) S Hanika	4	3
13	(Austria) **B Paulus**	**6**	**6**
(Austria) P Ritter	0	4
4	(Spain) **A Sánchez**	**6**	**6**

Quarterfinals
13	(Austria) B Paulus	4	3
4	(Spain) **A Sánchez**	**6**	**6**

==== Section 4 ====
First round
(West Germany) **S Meier**	**6**	**6**
(West Germany) S Menning	2	4
(West Germany) A Betzner	3	4
(Czechoslovakia) **I Budařová**	**6**	**6**
(Czechoslovakia) R Maršíková	6	4
12	(France) **I Demongeot**	**7**	**6**
9	(Czechoslovakia) **R Zrubáková**	**7**	**6**
(Luxembourg) K Kschwendt	6	4
(Australia) L Field	4	4
(West Germany) **C Porwik**	**6**	**6**
(West Germany) M Živec-Škulj	**6**	5	1
(Brazil) **A Vieira**	4	**7**	**6**

Second round
6	(Czechoslovakia) **J Novotná**	**6**	**6**
(West Germany) S Meier	1	2
(Czechoslovakia) I Budařová	1	6
12	(France) **I Demongeot**	**6**	**7**
9	(Czechoslovakia) **R Zrubáková**	**6**	**6**
(West Germany) C Porwik	2	3
(Brazil) **A Vieira**	**7**	1	**6**
2	(Czechoslovakia) H Suková	5	**6**	4

Third round
6	(Czechoslovakia) **J Novotná**	**6**	**6**
12	(France) I Demongeot	2	0
9	(Czechoslovakia) **R Zrubáková**	**6**	**6**
(Brazil) A Vieira	1	4

Quarterfinals
6	(Czechoslovakia) **J Novotná**	**6**	**6**
9	(Czechoslovakia) R Zrubáková	4	4
