= 1987 Citizen Cup – Singles =

Singles
- 1987 Citizen Cup

Final
- Champion: (West Germany) Steffi Graf
- Runner-up: (West Germany) Isabel Cueto
- Score: 6–2, 6–2

Details
- Draw: 56
- Seeds: 14

Events
Singles	Doubles
← 1983 ·	Hamburg European Open	· 1988 →

Andrea Temesvári was the last champion of the tournament in 1983. She did not compete this year.

Steffi Graf won the title by defeating Isabel Cueto 6–2, 6–2 in the final.

== Seeds ==
The first eight seeds received a bye into the second round.

1. (West Germany) Steffi Graf (champion)
2. (West Germany) Claudia Kohde-Kilsch (second round)
3. (West Germany) Bettina Bunge (second round)
4. (Italy) Raffaella Reggi (quarterfinals)
5. (Italy) Sandra Cecchini (semifinals)
6. (United States) Kathleen Horvath (semifinals)
7. (Austria) Judith Wiesner (third round)
8. (West Germany) Silke Meier (third round)
9. (Spain) Arantxa Sánchez Vicario (third round)
10. (United States) Michelle Torres (third round)
11. (France) Catherine Tanvier (first round)
12. (n/a)
13. (West Germany) Isabel Cueto (final)
14. (Argentina) Mariana Pérez Roldán (third round)

== Draw ==
Key

- Q = Qualifier
- WC = Wild card
- LL = Lucky loser
- Alt = Alternate
- ITF = ITF entry
- PR = Protected ranking
- SR = Special ranking
- SE = Special exempt
- JE = Junior exempt
- JR = Junior Accelerator Programme entrant
- CO = College Accelerator Programme entrant
- NG = Next Gen Accelerator Program entrant
- w/o = Walkover
- r = Retired
- d = Defaulted

=== Finals ===
Quarterfinals
1	(West Germany) Steffi Graf	6	6
(West Germany) Wiltrud Probst	2	0
4	(Italy) Raffaella Reggi	3	6	4
5	(Italy) Sandra Cecchini	6	1	6
(Socialist Federal Republic of Yugoslavia) Sabrina Goleš	1	6	1
13	(West Germany) Isabel Cueto	6	3	6
6	(United States) Kathleen Horvath	6	6	6
(Poland) Iwona Kuczyńska	1	7	3

Semifinals
1	(West Germany) Steffi Graf	6	6
5	(Italy) Sandra Cecchini	0	2
13	(West Germany) Isabel Cueto	6	1	6
6	(United States) Kathleen Horvath	4	6	2

Final
1	(West Germany) Steffi Graf	6	6
13	(West Germany) Isabel Cueto	2	2

=== Top half ===
==== Section 1 ====
First round
(Australia) L Field	7	6
(Italy) Marina Bottazzi	5	2
(Argentina) A Villagrán	7	7
(Italy) F Bonsignori	5	5
(Italy) L Golarsa	4	0^{r}
(Argentina) B Fulco	6	3
(Netherlands) N Jagerman	4	5
(West Germany) W Probst	6	7
(Czechoslovakia) R Maršíková	7	2	5
(Czechoslovakia) K Böhmová	6	6	7
(Netherlands) S Schilder	3	3
(Australia) J Byrne	6	6

Second round
1	(West Germany) S Graf	6	6
(Australia) L Field	1	2
(Argentina) A Villagrán	0	1
(Argentina) B Fulco	6	6
(West Germany) W Probst	6	6
(Czechoslovakia) K Böhmová	2	1
(Australia) J Byrne	6	3	3
8	(West Germany) S Meier	1	6	6

Third round
1	(West Germany) S Graf	6	6
(Argentina) B Fulco	2	4
(West Germany) W Probst	6	3	6
8	(West Germany) S Meier	1	6	1

Quarterfinals
1	(West Germany) S Graf	6	6
(West Germany) W Probst	2	0

==== Section 2 ====
First round
(Netherlands) M van der Torre	3	6	1
(Belgium) A Devries	6	3	6
(Argentina) M Paz	6	6
(Denmark) T Scheuer-Larsen	0	2
(South Africa) K Schimper	1	4
14	(Argentina) M Pérez Roldán	6	6
9	(Spain) A Sánchez Vicario	6	4	6
(Czechoslovakia) I Budařová	2	6	4
(West Germany) G Dinu	5	1
(West Germany) C Singer	7	6
(West Germany) M Pawlik	6	7
(West Germany) C Porwik	2	5

Second round
4	(Italy) R Reggi	6	6
(Belgium) A Devries	1	1
(Argentina) M Paz	5	3
14	(Argentina) M Pérez Roldán	7	6
9	(Spain) A Sánchez Vicario	6	6
(West Germany) C Singer	3	1
(West Germany) M Pawlik	2	2
5	(Italy) S Cecchini	6	6

Third round
4	(Italy) R Reggi	6	6
14	(Argentina) M Pérez Roldán	3	4
9	(Spain) A Sánchez Vicario	2	1
5	(Italy) S Cecchini	6	6

Quarterfinals
4	(Italy) R Reggi	3	6	4
5	(Italy) S Cecchini	6	1	6

=== Bottom half ===
==== Section 3 ====
First round
(Netherlands) M Bollegraf	6	2	6
(West Germany) K Düll	3	6	4
(Socialist Federal Republic of Yugoslavia) S Goleš	6	6
(Australia) N Provis	3	1
(Argentina) P Tarabini	6	6
11	(France) C Tanvier	3	0
13	(West Germany) I Cueto	6	6
(West Germany) T Weigl	4	1
(Austria) P Huber	6	6
(Italy) C Nozzoli	1	1
(Netherlands) H ter Riet	2	2
(Soviet Union) L Meskhi	6	6

Second round
7	(Austria) J Wiesner	6	6
(Netherlands) M Bollegraf	3	3
(Socialist Federal Republic of Yugoslavia) S Goleš	7	6
(Argentina) P Tarabini	5	1
13	(West Germany) I Cueto	7	6	6
(Austria) P Huber	5	7	1
(Soviet Union) L Meskhi	6	6
3	(West Germany) B Bunge	4	3

Third round
7	(Austria) J Wiesner	1	0
(Socialist Federal Republic of Yugoslavia) S Goleš	6	6
13	(West Germany) I Cueto	6	6
(Soviet Union) L Meskhi	3	3

Quarterfinals
(Socialist Federal Republic of Yugoslavia) S Goleš	1	6	1
13	(West Germany) I Cueto	6	3	6

==== Section 4 ====
First round
(Switzerland) E Krapl	0	6
(United States) V Nelson-Dunbar	6	7
(West Germany) H Thoms	7	7
(Argentina) N Marcucci	6	6
(Peru) P Vásquez	1	1
10	(United States) M Torres	6	6
(Poland) I Kuczyńska	6	7
(Sweden) C Karlsson	3	6
(Austria) B Paulus	3	2
(Czechoslovakia) R Rajchrtová	6	6
(Soviet Union) N Bykova	6	4	2
(Czechoslovakia) R Zrubáková	4	6	6

Second round
6	(United States) K Horvath	6	6
(United States) V Nelson-Dunbar	3	2
(West Germany) H Thoms	6	3	2
10	(United States) M Torres	3	6	6
(Poland) I Kuczyńska	2	7	6
(Czechoslovakia) R Rajchrtová	6	5	4
(Czechoslovakia) R Zrubáková	3	4
2	(West Germany) C Kohde-Kilsch	6	6

Third round
6	(United States) K Horvath	6	6
10	(United States) M Torres	3	2
(Poland) I Kuczyńska	6	6
2	(West Germany) C Kohde-Kilsch	2	4

Quarterfinals
6	(United States) K Horvath	6	6	6
(Poland) I Kuczyńska	1	7	3
