= 1987 Citizen Cup – Doubles =

Doubles
- 1987 Citizen Cup

Final
- Champions: (West Germany) Claudia Kohde-Kilsch (Czechoslovakia) Jana Novotná
- Runners-up: (Soviet Union) Natalia Bykova (Soviet Union) Leila Meskhi
- Score: 7–6^{(7–1)}, 7–6^{(8–6)}

Details
- Draw: 28
- Seeds: 8

Events
Singles	Doubles
← 1983 ·	Hamburg European Open	· 1988 →

Bettina Bunge and Claudia Kohde-Kilsch were the last champions of the tournament in 1983.

Bunge teamed up with Steffi Graf and lost in the quarterfinals to Natalia Bykova and Leila Meskhi.

Kohde-Kilsch teamed up with Jana Novotná and successfully defended her title, by defeating Bykova and Meskhi 7–6^{(7–1)}, 7–6^{(8–6)} in the final.

== Seeds ==
The first four seeds received a bye into the second round.

1. (West Germany) Bettina Bunge / (West Germany) Steffi Graf (quarterfinals)
2. (West Germany) Claudia Kohde-Kilsch / (Czechoslovakia) Jana Novotná (champions)
3. (Argentina) Mercedes Paz / (Denmark) Tine Scheuer-Larsen (semifinals)
4. (France) Catherine Tanvier / (Argentina) Patricia Tarabini (second round)
5. (Australia) Jenny Byrne / (Australia) Louise Field (first round)
6. (United States) Kathleen Horvath / (Italy) Raffaella Reggi (quarterfinals)
7. (Italy) Sandra Cecchini / (Socialist Federal Republic of Yugoslavia) Sabrina Goleš (quarterfinals)
8. (West Germany) Isabel Cueto / (Spain) Arantxa Sánchez Vicario (quarterfinals)

== Draw ==
Key

- Q = Qualifier
- WC = Wild card
- LL = Lucky loser
- Alt = Alternate
- ITF = ITF entry
- PR = Protected ranking
- SR = Special ranking
- SE = Special exempt
- JE = Junior exempt
- JR = Junior Accelerator Programme entrant
- CO = College Accelerator Programme entrant
- NG = Next Gen Accelerator Program entrant
- w/o = Walkover
- r = Retired
- d = Defaulted

=== Finals ===
Semifinals
(Soviet Union) Natalia Bykova (Soviet Union) Leila Meskhi	6	3	6
(Netherlands) Manon Bollegraf (Netherlands) Marianne van der Torre	3	6	2
3	(Argentina) Mercedes Paz (Denmark) Tine Scheuer-Larsen	3	5
2	(West Germany) Claudia Kohde-Kilsch (Czechoslovakia) Jana Novotná	6	7

Final
(Soviet Union) Natalia Bykova (Soviet Union) Leila Meskhi	6^{1}	6^{6}
2	(West Germany) Claudia Kohde-Kilsch (Czechoslovakia) Jana Novotná	7^{7}	7^{8}

=== Top half ===
First round
(Netherlands) N Jagerman (Netherlands) S Schilder	6	6
(United States) V Nelson-Dunbar (Peru) P Vásquez	4	2
(Czechoslovakia) I Budařová (West Germany) C Porwik	4	1
(West Germany) A Betzner (West Germany) C Singer	6	6
(Soviet Union) N Bykova (Soviet Union) L Meskhi	6	6
5	(Australia) J Byrne (Australia) L Field	3	2
(Netherlands) C Bakkum (Netherlands) B Schultz	1	6	5
(Netherlands) M Bollegraf (Netherlands) M van der Torre	6	4	7
(Italy) L Golarsa (United States) J Goodling	2	4
(Australia) N Provis (South Africa) K Schimper	6	6
(Czechoslovakia) R Maršíková (Czechoslovakia) R Rajchrtová
8	(West Germany) I Cueto (Spain) A Sánchez Vicario	w/o

Second round
1	(West Germany) B Bunge (West Germany) S Graf	6	6
(Netherlands) N Jagerman (Netherlands) S Schilder	1	3
(West Germany) A Betzner (West Germany) C Singer	3	1
(Soviet Union) N Bykova (Soviet Union) L Meskhi	6	6
4	(France) C Tanvier (Argentina) P Tarabini	3	1
(Netherlands) M Bollegraf (Netherlands) M van der Torre	6	6
(Australia) N Provis (South Africa) K Schimper	4	3
8	(West Germany) I Cueto (Spain) A Sánchez Vicario	6	6

Quarterfinals
1	(West Germany) B Bunge (West Germany) S Graf	6	7	4
(Soviet Union) N Bykova (Soviet Union) L Meskhi	7	6	6
(Netherlands) M Bollegraf (Netherlands) M van der Torre	6	4	6
8	(West Germany) I Cueto (Spain) A Sánchez Vicario	3	6	4

Semifinals
(Soviet Union) N Bykova (Soviet Union) L Meskhi	6	3	6
(Netherlands) M Bollegraf (Netherlands) M van der Torre	3	6	2

=== Bottom half ===
First round
6	(United States) K Horvath (Italy) R Reggi	6	6
(Italy) F Bonsignori (Netherlands) H ter Riet	3	2
(Belgium) A Devries (Switzerland) E Krapl	7	6
(West Germany) M Pawlik (West Germany) H Thoms	6	2
(Austria) P Huber (West Germany) S Meier
(Argentina) B Fulco (West Germany) W Probst	w/o
7	(Italy) S Cecchini (Socialist Federal Republic of Yugoslavia) S Goleš	6	6
(Czechoslovakia) K Böhmová (Czechoslovakia) R Zrubáková	3	1
(Argentina) M Pérez Roldán (Austria) J Wiesner	6	6
(Poland) I Kuczyńska (Czechoslovakia) M Pazderová	2	2
(Argentina) G Mosca (Argentina) A Villagrán	6	7
(West Germany) K Düll (West Germany) T Weigl	3	5

Second round
6	(United States) K Horvath (Italy) R Reggi	7	6
(Belgium) A Devries (Switzerland) E Krapl	6	4
(Argentina) B Fulco (West Germany) W Probst	2	2
3	(Argentina) M Paz (Denmark) T Scheuer-Larsen	6	6
7	(Italy) S Cecchini (Socialist Federal Republic of Yugoslavia) S Goleš	w/o
(Argentina) M Pérez Roldán (Austria) J Wiesner
(Argentina) G Mosca (Argentina) A Villagrán
2	(West Germany) C Kohde-Kilsch (Czechoslovakia) J Novotná	w/o

Quarterfinals
6	(United States) K Horvath (Italy) R Reggi	4	3
3	(Argentina) M Paz (Denmark) T Scheuer-Larsen	6	6
7	(Italy) S Cecchini (Socialist Federal Republic of Yugoslavia) S Goleš	2	3
2	(West Germany) C Kohde-Kilsch (Czechoslovakia) J Novotná	6	6

Semifinals
3	(Argentina) M Paz (Denmark) T Scheuer-Larsen	3	5
2	(West Germany) C Kohde-Kilsch (Czechoslovakia) J Novotná	6	7
