= 1988 European Indoors – Doubles =

Doubles
- 1988 European Indoors

Final
- Champions: (France) Isabelle Demongeot (France) Nathalie Tauziat
- Runners-up: (West Germany) Claudia Kohde-Kilsch (Czechoslovakia) Helena Suková
- Score: 6–3, 6–3

Details
- Draw: 16
- Seeds: 4

Events
Singles	Doubles
← 1987 ·	European Indoors	· 1989 →

Nathalie Herreman and Pascale Paradis were the defending champions but only Herreman competed that year with Sophie Amiach.

Amiach and Herreman lost in the quarterfinals to Claudia Kohde-Kilsch and Helena Suková.

Isabelle Demongeot and Nathalie Tauziat won in the final 6–3, 6–3 against Kohde-Kilsch and Suková.

== Seeds ==
Champion seeds are indicated in bold text while text in italics indicates the round in which those seeds were eliminated.

1. (West Germany) Claudia Kohde-Kilsch / (Czechoslovakia) Helena Suková (final)
2. (Czechoslovakia) Jana Novotná / (France) Catherine Suire (semifinals)
3. (France) **Isabelle Demongeot** / (France) **Nathalie Tauziat (champions)**
4. (New Zealand) Belinda Cordwell / (South Africa) Dianne van Rensburg (quarterfinals)

== Draw ==
=== Key ===
- Q = Qualifier
- WC = Wild card
- LL = Lucky loser
- Alt = Alternate
- SE = Special exempt
- PR = Protected ranking
- ITF = ITF entry
- JE = Junior exempt
- w/o = Walkover
- r = Retired
- d = Defaulted
- SR = Special ranking

First round
1	(West Germany) **C Kohde-Kilsch** (Czechoslovakia) **H Suková**	**6**	**6**
(West Germany) S Frankl (Austria) H Sprung	1	1
(Czechoslovakia) I Budařová (Switzerland) E Krapl	1	2
(France) **S Amiach** (France) **N Herreman**	**6**	**6**
4	(New Zealand) **B Cordwell** (South Africa) **D van Rensburg**	**6**	4	**6**
(Luxembourg) K Kschwendt (West Germany) S Meier	1	**6**	2
(United States) **T Austin** (United States) **P Shriver**	**6**	**6**
(West Germany) A Betzner (West Germany) W Probst	1	2
(Italy) **R Reggi** (South Africa) **E Reinach**	**6**	**6**
(Czechoslovakia) P Langrová (Czechoslovakia) J Pospíšilová	2	3
(Austria) B Paulus (West Germany) C Porwik	0	3
3	(France) **I Demongeot** (France) **N Tauziat**	**6**	**6**
(United Kingdom) J Durie (United States) S Walsh-Pete	5	4
(Sweden) **C Lindqvist** (Sweden) **M Strandlund**	**7**	**6**
(West Germany) S Auer (West Germany) H Thoms	4	3
2	(Czechoslovakia) **J Novotná** (France) **C Suire**	**6**	**6**

Quarterfinals
1	(West Germany) **C Kohde-Kilsch** (Czechoslovakia) **H Suková**	4	**6**	**7**
(France) S Amiach (France) N Herreman	**6**	3	5
4	(New Zealand) B Cordwell (South Africa) D van Rensburg
(United States) **T Austin** (United States) **P Shriver**	**w/o**
(Italy) R Reggi (South Africa) E Reinach	3	4
3	(France) **I Demongeot** (France) **N Tauziat**	**6**	**6**
(Sweden) C Lindqvist (Sweden) M Strandlund	2	6
2	(Czechoslovakia) **J Novotná** (France) **C Suire**	**6**	**7**

Semifinals
1	(West Germany) **C Kohde-Kilsch** (Czechoslovakia) **H Suková**	**6**	2	**6**
(United States) T Austin (United States) P Shriver	2	**6**	4
3	(France) **I Demongeot** (France) **N Tauziat**	**6**	5	**6**
2	(Czechoslovakia) J Novotná (France) C Suire	4	**7**	4

Final
1	(West Germany) Claudia Kohde-Kilsch (Czechoslovakia) Helena Suková	3	3
3	(France) **Isabelle Demongeot** (France) **Nathalie Tauziat**	**6**	**6**
