= 1989 Citizen Cup – Doubles =

Doubles
- 1989 Citizen Cup
- 1988 Champions: (Czechoslovakia) Jana Novotná; (Denmark) Tine Scheuer-Larsen

Final
- Champions: (France) Isabelle Demongeot
- Runners-up: (Czechoslovakia) Jana Novotná; (Czechoslovakia) Helena Suková
- Score: Walkover

Details
- Draw: 24
- Seeds: 8

Events
Singles	Doubles
← 1988 ·	Hamburg European Open	· 1990 →

Jana Novotná and Tine Scheuer-Larsen were the defending champions but they competed with different partners that year, Novotná with Helena Suková and Scheuer-Larsen with Catarina Lindqvist.

Lindqvist and Scheuer-Larsen lost in the semifinals to Isabelle Demongeot and Nathalie Tauziat.

Novotná and Suková lost the final on a walkover against Demongeot and Tauziat.

== Seeds ==
Champion seeds are indicated in bold text while text in italics indicates the round in which those seeds were eliminated. All eight seeded teams received byes into the second round.

1. (Czechoslovakia) Jana Novotná / (Czechoslovakia) Helena Suková (final)
2. (France) **Isabelle Demongeot** / (France) **Nathalie Tauziat (champions)**
3. (Netherlands) Manon Bollegraf / (West Germany) Eva Pfaff (semifinals)
4. (Sweden) Catarina Lindqvist / (Denmark) Tine Scheuer-Larsen (semifinals)
5. (Italy) Sandra Cecchini / (West Germany) Claudia Porwik (quarterfinals)
6. (Spain) Arantxa Sánchez / (Argentina) Patricia Tarabini (quarterfinals)
7. (Australia) Jo-Anne Faull / (Australia) Rachel McQuillan (quarterfinals)
8. (Netherlands) Carin Bakkum / (Netherlands) Nicole Jagerman (second round)

== Draw ==
Key

- Q = Qualifier
- WC = Wild card
- LL = Lucky loser
- Alt = Alternate
- ITF = ITF entry
- PR = Protected ranking
- SR = Special ranking
- SE = Special exempt
- JE = Junior exempt
- JR = Junior Accelerator Programme entrant
- CO = College Accelerator Programme entrant
- NG = Next Gen Accelerator Program entrant
- w/o = Walkover
- r = Retired
- d = Defaulted

=== Final ===
Final

1
- (Czechoslovakia) Jana Novotná
- (Czechoslovakia) Helena Suková

2
- (France) **Isabelle Demongeot**
- (France) **Nathalie Tauziat**
**w/o**

=== Top half ===
First round

Second round

Quarterfinals

Semifinals

1
- (Czechoslovakia) **J Novotná**
- (Czechoslovakia) **H Suková**
**6**
**6**

- (South Africa) **A Coetzer**
- (West Germany) **S Frankl**
**6**
**6**

- (South Africa) A Coetzer
- (West Germany) S Frankl
1
2

- (West Germany) S Auer
- (Austria) P Huber
3
1

1
- (Czechoslovakia) **J Novotná**
- (Czechoslovakia) **H Suková**
**6**
**6**

- (West Germany) **A Betzner**
- (West Germany) **W Probst**
**6**
4
**6**

6
- (Spain) A Sánchez
- (Argentina) P Tarabini
4
1

- (West Germany) S Menning
- (United Kingdom) S Timms
2
**6**
4

- (West Germany) A Betzner
- (West Germany) W Probst
3
4

6
- (Spain) **A Sánchez**
- (Argentina) **P Tarabini**
**6**
**6**

1
- (Czechoslovakia) **J Novotná**
- (Czechoslovakia) **H Suková**
**6**
**6**

3
- (Netherlands) M Bollegraf
- (West Germany) E Pfaff
2
1

3
- (Netherlands) **M Bollegraf**
- (West Germany) **E Pfaff**
4
**6**
**6**

- (France) **A Dechaume**
- (France) **S Niox-Chateau**
**7**
**6**

- (France) A Dechaume
- (France) S Niox-Chateau
**6**
2
3

- (Czechoslovakia) I Budařová
- (Czechoslovakia) D Krajčovičová
5
3

3
- (Netherlands) **M Bollegraf**
- (West Germany) **E Pfaff**
3
**6**
**6**

- (Poland) R Baranski
- (Brazil) A Vieira
2
5

- (Austria) B Paulus
- (Czechoslovakia) R Zrubáková
**6**
3
3

- (Austria) **B Paulus**
- (Czechoslovakia) **R Zrubáková**
**6**
**7**

- (Austria) **B Paulus**
- (Czechoslovakia) **R Zrubáková**
1
**6**
**6**

8
- (Netherlands) C Bakkum
- (Netherlands) N Jagerman
**6**
4
3

=== Bottom half ===
First round

Second round

Quarterfinals

Semifinals

5
- (Italy) **S Cecchini**
- (West Germany) **C Porwik**
**6**
**7**

- (United Kingdom) **J Salmon**
- (Netherlands) **T Wilmink**
**7**
**6**

- (United Kingdom) J Salmon
- (Netherlands) T Wilmink
1
5

- (Austria) P Ritter
- (West Germany) H Thoms
5
3

5
- (Italy) S Cecchini
- (West Germany) C Porwik
1
**6**
3

- (Czechoslovakia) R Maršíková
- (Peru) P Vásquez
6
5

4
- (Sweden) **C Lindqvist**
- (Denmark) **T Scheuer-Larsen**
**6**
3
**6**

- (Argentina) **B Fulco**
- (Argentina) **A Villagrán**
**7**
**7**

- (Argentina) B Fulco
- (Argentina) A Villagrán
1
**6**
3

4
- (Sweden) **C Lindqvist**
- (Denmark) **T Scheuer-Larsen**
**6**
4
**6**

4
- (Sweden) C Lindqvist
- (Denmark) T Scheuer-Larsen
5
0

2
- (France) **I Demongeot**
- (France) **N Tauziat**
**7**
**6**

7
- (Australia) **J-A Faull**
- (Australia) **R McQuillan**
**6**
**6**

- (West Germany) K Düll
- (West Germany) B Rittner
6
6

- (West Germany) I Cueto
- (West Germany) C Singer
0
2

- (West Germany) **I Cueto**
- (West Germany) **C Singer**
**7**
**7**

7
- (Australia) J-A Faull
- (Australia) R McQuillan
4
4

- (Australia) **L Field**
- (Australia) **L O'Neill**
**6**
**6**

2
- (France) **I Demongeot**
- (France) **N Tauziat**
**6**
**6**

- (Luxembourg) K Kschwendt
- (West Germany) S Meier
3
1

- (Australia) L Field
- (Australia) L O'Neill
**7**
2
1

2
- (France) **I Demongeot**
- (France) **N Tauziat**
5
**6**
**6**
