= 1988 European Indoors – Singles =

Singles
- 1988 European Indoors

Final
- Champion: (United States) Pam Shriver
- Runner-up: (Bulgaria) Manuela Maleeva
- Score: 6–3, 6–4

Details
- Draw: 32
- Seeds: 8

Events
Singles	Doubles
← 1987 ·	European Indoors	· 1989 →

Steffi Graf was the defending champion but did not compete that year.

Pam Shriver won in the final 6–3, 6–4 against Manuela Maleeva.

== Seeds ==
A champion seed is indicated in bold text while text in italics indicates the round in which that seed was eliminated.

1. (United States) **Pam Shriver (champion)**
2. (Czechoslovakia) Helena Suková (second round)
3. (Bulgaria) Manuela Maleeva (final)
4. (West Germany) Claudia Kohde-Kilsch (semifinals)
5. (Bulgaria) Katerina Maleeva (quarterfinals)
6. (Italy) Sandra Cecchini (first round)
7. (France) Nathalie Tauziat (first round)
8. (Italy) Raffaella Reggi (quarterfinals)

== Draw ==
=== Key ===
- Q = Qualifier
- WC = Wild card
- LL = Lucky loser
- Alt = Alternate
- SE = Special exempt
- PR = Protected ranking
- ITF = ITF entry
- JE = Junior exempt
- w/o = Walkover
- r = Retired
- d = Defaulted
- SR = Special ranking

First round
1	(United States) **P Shriver**	4	**7**	**6**
(Austria) J Wiesner	**6**	5	0
(Czechoslovakia) J Novotná	5	6
Q	(Sweden) **J Jonerup**	**7**	**7**
LL	(West Germany) S Frankl	1	2
(Netherlands) **B Schultz**	**6**	**6**
(South Africa) **D van Rensburg**	**6**	**6**
6	(Italy) S Cecchini	1	2
4	(West Germany) **C Kohde-Kilsch**	**6**	**6**
(Sweden) C Lindqvist	1	4
Q	(Austria) **P Ritter**	**6**	**6**
(Czechoslovakia) I Budařová	0	2
Q	(West Germany) S Auer	**7**	1	6
(West Germany) **W Probst**	6	**6**	**7**
(Italy) C Caverzasio	3	3
8	(Italy) **R Reggi**	**6**	**6**
5	(Bulgaria) **K Maleeva**	**6**	**6**
(West Germany) S Meier	4	2
(France) **I Demongeot**	**7**	**6**
(Switzerland) E Krapl	5	2
(United Kingdom) M Javer	5	**6**	2
(United Kingdom) **J Durie**	**7**	3	**6**
(Czechoslovakia) P Langrová	3	0
3	(Bulgaria) **M Maleeva**	**6**	**6**
7	(France) N Tauziat	3	6
(Spain) **C Martínez**	**6**	**7**
(West Germany) C Porwik	**6**	1	5
(New Zealand) **B Cordwell**	2	**6**	**7**
Q	(Czechoslovakia) **J Pospíšilová**	6	**6**	**7**
(Austria) B Paulus	**7**	1	5
(France) J Halard	**6**	6	4
2	(Czechoslovakia) **H Suková**	2	**7**	**6**

Second round
1	(United States) **P Shriver**	**6**	**6**
Q	(Sweden) J Jonerup	0	3
(Netherlands) **B Schultz**	4	**2**
(South Africa) D van Rensburg	**6**	3	r
4	(West Germany) **C Kohde-Kilsch**	**6**	**6**
Q	(Austria) P Ritter	2	1
(West Germany) W Probst	2	**6**	2
8	(Italy) **R Reggi**	**6**	4	**6**
5	(Bulgaria) **K Maleeva**	**6**	**6**
(France) I Demongeot	3	2
(United Kingdom) J Durie	2	4
3	(Bulgaria) **M Maleeva**	**6**	**6**
(Spain) **C Martínez**	**6**	6	**6**
(New Zealand) B Cordwell	3	**7**	1
Q	(Czechoslovakia) **J Pospíšilová**	**6**	**6**
2	(Czechoslovakia) H Suková	3	3

Quarterfinals
1	(United States) **P Shriver**	**6**	**6**
(Netherlands) B Schultz	3	3
4	(West Germany) **C Kohde-Kilsch**	**6**	**7**
8	(Italy) R Reggi	1	5
5	(Bulgaria) K Maleeva	2	2
3	(Bulgaria) **M Maleeva**	**6**	**6**
(Spain) **C Martínez**	**6**	5	**6**
Q	(Czechoslovakia) J Pospíšilová	0	**7**	4

Semifinals
1	(United States) **P Shriver**	**6**	**6**
4	(West Germany) C Kohde-Kilsch	4	4
3	(Bulgaria) **M Maleeva**	4	**6**	**6**
(Spain) C Martínez	**6**	4	4

Final
1	(United States) **Pam Shriver**	**6**	**6**
3	(Bulgaria) Manuela Maleeva	3	4
