= 1990 BMW European Indoors – Singles =

Singles
- 1990 BMW European Indoors

Final
- Champion: (Germany) Steffi Graf
- Runner-up: (Argentina) Gabriela Sabatini
- Score: 6–3, 6–2

Details
- Draw: 32 (4Q/2LL)
- Seeds: 8

Events
Singles	Doubles
← 1989 ·	Zurich Open	· 1991 →

Steffi Graf successfully defended her title, by defeating Gabriela Sabatini 6–3, 6–2 in the final.

== Seeds ==
1. (Germany) Steffi Graf (champion)
2. (Argentina) Gabriela Sabatini (final)
3. (Switzerland) Manuela Maleeva-Fragnière (semifinals)
4. (Czechoslovakia) Jana Novotná (semifinals)
5. (Czechoslovakia) Helena Suková (quarterfinals)
6. (Austria) Judith Wiesner (second round)
7. (France) Nathalie Tauziat (quarterfinals)
8. (South Africa) Rosalyn Fairbank-Nideffer (first round)

== Draw ==
=== Key ===
- Q = Qualifier
- WC = Wild card
- LL = Lucky loser
- Alt = Alternate
- SE = Special exempt
- PR = Protected ranking
- ITF = ITF entry
- JE = Junior exempt
- w/o = Walkover
- r = Retired
- d = Defaulted
- SR = Special ranking

=== Finals ===
Semifinals
1	(Germany) Steffi Graf	6	6	6
3	(Switzerland) Manuela Maleeva-Fragnière	7	2	3
4	(Czechoslovakia) Jana Novotná	7	5	6
2	(Argentina) Gabriela Sabatini	6	7	7

Final
1	(Germany) Steffi Graf	6	6
2	(Argentina) Gabriela Sabatini	3	2

=== Top half ===
First round
1	(Germany) S Graf	6	6
(United States) A Leand	1	4
(France) N Herreman	6	7	4
(South Africa) D Van Rensburg	7	5	6
Q	(France) N Guerrée-Spitzer	6	3	7
LL	(France) C Suire	1	6	6
(Australia) R McQuillan	7	2	1
7	(France) N Tauziat	6	6	6
3	(Switzerland) M Maleeva-Fragnière	6	3	6
(Netherlands) M Bollegraf	1	6	2
(Germany) C Porwik	6	6
Q	(Soviet Union) J Salnikova	2	2
(Netherlands) B Schultz	6	6
(Argentina) P Tarabini	4	4
(Switzerland) C Caverzasio	6	2	0
6	(Austria) J Wiesner	2	6	6

Second round
1	(Germany) S Graf	6	6
(South Africa) D Van Rensburg	1	4
Q	(France) N Guerrée-Spitzer	4	2
7	(France) N Tauziat	6	6
3	(Switzerland) M Maleeva-Fragnière	6	3	6
(Germany) C Porwik	1	6	2
(Netherlands) B Schultz	6	6	7
6	(Austria) J Wiesner	7	4	6

Quarterfinals
1	(Germany) S Graf	6	6
7	(France) N Tauziat	4	1
3	(Switzerland) M Maleeva-Fragnière	6	6
(Netherlands) B Schultz	3	2

Semifinals
1	(Germany) S Graf	6	6	6
3	(Switzerland) M Maleeva-Fragnière	7	2	3

=== Bottom half ===
First round
8	(South Africa) R Fairbank-Nideffer	2	3
(Germany) W Probst	6	6
(Italy) L Golarsa	6	7
(Belgium) S Appelmans	4	5
(France) J Halard	4	6	6
(Argentina) M Paz	6	4	7
(United Kingdom) J Durie	4	0
4	(Czechoslovakia) J Novotná	6	6
5	(Czechoslovakia) H Suková	6	6
(Italy) L Ferrando	2	2
(Switzerland) E Zardo	6	6
Q	(Switzerland) Jillian Müller	1	2
(Germany) C Kohde-Kilsch	7	6
Q	(Germany) E Pfaff	5	2
LL	(Germany) S Menning	2	1
2	(Argentina) G Sabatini	6	6

Second round
(Germany) W Probst	7	7
(Italy) L Golarsa	5	6
(Argentina) M Paz	2	2
4	(Czechoslovakia) J Novotná	6	6
5	(Czechoslovakia) H Suková	6	7
(Switzerland) E Zardo	4	5
(Germany) C Kohde-Kilsch	4	5
2	(Argentina) G Sabatini	6	7

Quarterfinals
(Germany) W Probst	0	1
4	(Czechoslovakia) J Novotná	6	6
5	(Czechoslovakia) H Suková	4	5
2	(Argentina) G Sabatini	6	7

Semifinals
4	(Czechoslovakia) J Novotná	7	5	6
2	(Argentina) G Sabatini	6	7	7
