= 1990 Citizen Cup – Singles =

Singles
- 1990 Citizen Cup

Final
- Champion: (West Germany) Steffi Graf
- Runner-up: (Spain) Arantxa Sánchez Vicario
- Score: 5–7, 6–0, 6–1

Details
- Draw: 56
- Seeds: 16

Events
Singles	Doubles
← 1989 ·	Hamburg European Open	· 1991 →

Steffi Graf won her fourth consecutive title at Hamburg by defeating Arantxa Sánchez Vicario 5–7, 6–0, 6–1 in the final.

== Seeds ==
The first eight seeds received a bye into the second round.

1. (West Germany) Steffi Graf (champion)
2. (United States) Martina Navratilova (semifinals)
3. (Spain) Arantxa Sánchez Vicario (final)
4. (Bulgaria) Katerina Maleeva (second round, withdrew)
5. (Czechoslovakia) Helena Suková (quarterfinals)
6. (France) Nathalie Tauziat (third round)
7. (Peru) Laura Gildemeister (third round)
8. (Austria) Judith Wiesner (semifinals)
9. (West Germany) Isabel Cueto (third round)
10. (n/a)
11. (Soviet Union) Leila Meskhi (quarterfinals)
12. (Soviet Union) Larisa Savchenko-Neiland (first round)
13. (n/a)
14. (Czechoslovakia) Radka Zrubáková (first round)
15. (Switzerland) Cathy Caverzasio (second round)
16. (West Germany) Sylvia Hanika (third round)

== Draw ==
Key

- Q = Qualifier
- WC = Wild card
- LL = Lucky loser
- Alt = Alternate
- ITF = ITF entry
- PR = Protected ranking
- SR = Special ranking
- SE = Special exempt
- JE = Junior exempt
- JR = Junior Accelerator Programme entrant
- CO = College Accelerator Programme entrant
- NG = Next Gen Accelerator Program entrant
- w/o = Walkover
- r = Retired
- d = Defaulted

=== Finals ===
Quarterfinals
1	(Germany) Steffi Graf	6	6
5	(Czechoslovakia) Helena Suková	1	2
(Czechoslovakia) Petra Langrová	3	1
8	(Austria) Judith Wiesner	6	6
(Netherlands) Nicole Jagerman	3	0
3	(Spain) Arantxa Sánchez Vicario	6	6
11	(Soviet Union) Leila Meskhi	3	4
2	(United States) Martina Navratilova	6	6

Semifinals
1	(Germany) Steffi Graf	6	6
8	(Austria) Judith Wiesner	4	2
3	(Spain) Arantxa Sánchez Vicario	6	6	6
2	(United States) Martina Navratilova	1	7	2

Final
1	(Germany) Steffi Graf	5	6	6
3	(Spain) Arantxa Sánchez Vicario	7	0	1

=== Top half ===
==== Section 1 ====
First round
(Australia) L Field	6	3	1
(Italy) L Lapi	4	6	6
(France) J Halard	5	6	6
(Netherlands) B Schultz	7	0	1
(Australia) N Provis	6	1	6
14	(Czechoslovakia) R Zrubáková	4	6	1
(Italy) S Cecchini	0	6	4
(Czechoslovakia) R Rajchrtová	6	2	6
(South Africa) A Coetzer	0	6	6
(Sweden) C Dahlman	6	1	3
(Germany) A Huber	6	2	3
(Germany) S Meier	0	6	6

Second round
1	(Germany) S Graf	6	6
(Italy) L Lapi	1	2
(France) J Halard	4	6
(Australia) N Provis	6	7
(Czechoslovakia) R Rajchrtová	6	3	6
(South Africa) A Coetzer	4	6	1
(Germany) S Meier	1	6	5
5	(Czechoslovakia) H Suková	6	4	7

Third round
1	(Germany) S Graf	6	6
(Australia) N Provis	0	2
(Czechoslovakia) R Rajchrtová	6	2
5	(Czechoslovakia) H Suková	7	6

Quarterfinals
1	(Germany) S Graf	6	6
5	(Czechoslovakia) H Suková	1	2

==== Section 2 ====
First round
(Germany) M Kochta	3	5
(France) I Demongeot	6	7
(Brazil) A Vieira	4	4
(Czechoslovakia) P Langrová	6	6
(Socialist Federal Republic of Yugoslavia) S Goleš	5	1
15	(Switzerland) C Caverzasio	7	6
12	(Soviet Union) L Savchenko-Neiland	0	6	4
(France) C Tanvier	6	2	6
(Germany) W Probst	6	6
(Sweden) M Strandlund	1	2
(Germany) S Frankl	6	6
(France) N Herreman	1	1

Second round
4	(Bulgaria) K Maleeva
(France) I Demongeot	w/o
(Czechoslovakia) P Langrová	6	6
15	(Switzerland) C Caverzasio	3	4
(France) C Tanvier	3	2
(Germany) W Probst	6	6
(Germany) S Frankl	1	0
8	(Austria) J Wiesner	6	6

Third round
(France) I Demongeot	4	4
(Czechoslovakia) P Langrová	6	6
(Germany) W Probst	3	2
8	(Austria) J Wiesner	6	6

Quarterfinals
(Czechoslovakia) P Langrová	3	1
8	(Austria) J Wiesner	6	6

=== Bottom half ===
==== Section 3 ====
First round
(Germany) S Hack	6	4	1
(United States) S Martin	3	6	6
(Netherlands) N Jagerman	6	6
(South Africa) E Reinach	4	4
(Germany) K Düll	4	1
(Australia) T Morton	6	6
16	(Germany) S Hanika	6	6
(Argentina) F Labat	4	4
(Bulgaria) E Pampoulova	4	7	6
(Germany) M Pawlik	6	6	2
(Germany) B Rittner	6	6
(Switzerland) E Krapl	0	1

Second round
6	(France) N Tauziat	4	6	6
(United States) S Martin	6	3	3
(Netherlands) N Jagerman	6	7
(Australia) T Morton	3	5
16	(Germany) S Hanika	6	6
(Bulgaria) E Pampoulova	4	0
(Germany) B Rittner	4	1
3	(Spain) A Sánchez Vicario	6	6

Third round
6	(France) N Tauziat	4	6	1
(Netherlands) N Jagerman	6	2	6
16	(Germany) S Hanika	1	1
3	(Spain) A Sánchez Vicario	6	6

Quarterfinals
(Netherlands) N Jagerman	3	0
3	(Spain) A Sánchez Vicario	6	6

==== Section 4 ====
First round
(Greece) A Kanellopoulou	6	6
(Australia) JA Faull	1	1
(Soviet Union) N Medvedeva	6	1
(Poland) R Baranski	7	6
(Argentina) B Fulco	2	0^{r}
11	(Soviet Union) L Meskhi	6	2
9	(West Germany) I Cueto	6	6
(Australia) M Jaggard	0	2
(Argentina) M Paz	6	6
(Hungary) A Temesvári-Trunkos	2	2
(Australia) R McQuillan	6	6	7
(Argentina) P Tarabini	7	0	6

Second round
7	(Peru) L Gildemeister	7	6
(Greece) A Kanellopoulou	5	4
(Poland) R Baranski	7	1	2
11	(Soviet Union) L Meskhi	5	6	6
9	(West Germany) I Cueto	3	6	6
(Argentina) M Paz	6	4	4
(Australia) R McQuillan	6	1	1
2	(United States) M Navratilova	3	6	6

Third round
7	(Peru) L Gildemeister	6	3	1
11	(Soviet Union) L Meskhi	1	6	6
9	(West Germany) I Cueto	2	2
2	(United States) M Navratilova	6	6

Quarterfinals
11	(Soviet Union) L Meskhi	3	4
2	(United States) M Navratilova	6	6
