= 1990 BMW European Indoors – Doubles =

Doubles
- 1990 BMW European Indoors

Final
- Champions: (Netherlands) Manon Bollegraf (Germany) Eva Pfaff
- Runners-up: (France) Catherine Suire (South Africa) Dianne Van Rensburg
- Score: 7–5, 6–4

Details
- Draw: 16
- Seeds: 4

Events
Singles	Doubles
← 1989 ·	Zurich Open	· 1991 →

Jana Novotná and Helena Suková were the defending champions, but lost in the semifinals to Catherine Suire and Dianne Van Rensburg.

Manon Bollegraf and Eva Pfaff won the title by defeating Suire and Van Rensburg 7–5, 6–4 in the final.

== Seeds ==
1. (Czechoslovakia) Jana Novotná / (Czechoslovakia) Helena Suková (semifinals)
2. (Argentina) Mercedes Paz / (Argentina) Gabriela Sabatini (quarterfinals)
3. (United Kingdom) Jo Durie / (South Africa) Rosalyn Fairbank-Nideffer (first round)
4. (Germany) Claudia Kohde-Kilsch / (Netherlands) Brenda Schultz (quarterfinals)

== Draw ==
=== Key ===
- Q = Qualifier
- WC = Wild card
- LL = Lucky loser
- Alt = Alternate
- SE = Special exempt
- PR = Protected ranking
- ITF = ITF entry
- JE = Junior exempt
- w/o = Walkover
- r = Retired
- d = Defaulted
- SR = Special ranking

=== Draw ===
First round
1	(Czechoslovakia) J Novotná (Czechoslovakia) H Suková	6	6
(Soviet Union) A Blumberga (Soviet Union) J Salnikova	1	0
(United States) A Leand (Brazil) L Tella	4	5
(Switzerland) E Krapl (Germany) C Schneider	6	7
3	(United Kingdom) J Durie (South Africa) R Fairbank-Nideffer	4	6	4
(Switzerland) C Caverzasio (Switzerland) M Strebel	6	0	6
(Switzerland) M Maleeva-Fragnière (Australia) R McQuillan	4	6
(France) C Suire (South Africa) D Van Rensburg	6	7
(France) N Tauziat (Austria) J Wiesner	6	6
(Czechoslovakia) I Budařová (Czechoslovakia) L Lásková	0	4
(Germany) C Porwik (Germany) W Probst	4	2
4	(Germany) C Kohde-Kilsch (Netherlands) B Schultz	6	6
(Netherlands) M Bollegraf (Germany) E Pfaff	6	7
(Italy) L Ferrando (Italy) L Golarsa	0	5
(France) N Herreman (Argentina) P Tarabini	4	2
2	(Argentina) M Paz (Argentina) G Sabatini	6	6

Quarterfinals
1	(Czechoslovakia) J Novotná (Czechoslovakia) H Suková	6	6
(Switzerland) E Krapl (Germany) C Schneider	1	0
(Switzerland) C Caverzasio (Switzerland) M Strebel	4	7	4
(France) C Suire (South Africa) D Van Rensburg	6	6	6
(France) N Tauziat (Austria) J Wiesner	6	1	6
4	(Germany) C Kohde-Kilsch (Netherlands) B Schultz	3	6	3
(Netherlands) M Bollegraf (Germany) E Pfaff	7	7
2	(Argentina) M Paz (Argentina) G Sabatini	6	6

Semifinals
1	(Czechoslovakia) J Novotná (Czechoslovakia) H Suková	6	6	4
(France) C Suire (South Africa) D Van Rensburg	1	7	6
(France) N Tauziat (Austria) J Wiesner	6	3	4
(Netherlands) M Bollegraf (Germany) E Pfaff	3	6	6

Final
(France) C Suire (South Africa) D Van Rensburg	5	4
(Netherlands) M Bollegraf (Germany) E Pfaff	7	6
