= 1990 Citizen Cup – Doubles =

Doubles
- 1990 Citizen Cup

Final
- Champions: (United States) Gigi Fernández (United States) Martina Navratilova
- Runners-up: (Soviet Union) Larisa Savchenko-Neiland (Czechoslovakia) Helena Suková
- Score: 6–2, 6–3

Details
- Draw: 27
- Seeds: 8

Events
Singles	Doubles
← 1989 ·	Hamburg European Open	· 1991 →

Isabelle Demongeot and Nathalie Tauziat were the defending champions, but chose to compete this year with different partners. Demongeot teamed up with Catherine Tanvier and lost in the quarterfinals to Gigi Fernández and Martina Navratilova, while Tauziat teamed up with Judith Wiesner and also lost in the quarterfinals to Larisa Savchenko-Neiland and Helena Suková.

Fernández and Navratilova won the title by defeating Savchenko-Neiland and Suková 6–2, 6–3 in the final.

== Seeds ==
The first five seeds received a bye into the second round.

1. (Soviet Union) Larisa Savchenko-Neiland / (Czechoslovakia) Helena Suková (final)
2. (United States) Gigi Fernández / (United States) Martina Navratilova (champion)
3. (Argentina) Mercedes Paz / (Spain) Arantxa Sánchez Vicario (semifinals)
4. (Australia) Nicole Provis / (South Africa) Elna Reinach (semifinals)
5. (Soviet Union) Natalia Medvedeva / (Soviet Union) Leila Meskhi (quarterfinals)
6. (Italy) Sandra Cecchini / (Argentina) Patricia Tarabini (quarterfinals)
7. (France) Nathalie Tauziat / (Austria) Judith Wiesner (quarterfinals)
8. (Australia) Jo-Anne Faull / (Australia) Rachel McQuillan (second round)

== Draw ==
Key

- Q = Qualifier
- WC = Wild card
- LL = Lucky loser
- Alt = Alternate
- ITF = ITF entry
- PR = Protected ranking
- SR = Special ranking
- SE = Special exempt
- JE = Junior exempt
- JR = Junior Accelerator Programme entrant
- CO = College Accelerator Programme entrant
- NG = Next Gen Accelerator Program entrant
- w/o = Walkover
- r = Retired
- d = Defaulted

=== Finals ===
Semifinals
1	(Soviet Union) Larisa Savchenko-Neiland (Czechoslovakia) Helena Suková	6	6
3	(Argentina) Mercedes Paz (Spain) Arantxa Sánchez Vicario	3	4
4	(Australia) Nicole Provis (South Africa) Elna Reinach	2	0
2	(United States) Gigi Fernández (United States) Martina Navratilova	6	6

Final
1	(Soviet Union) Larisa Savchenko-Neiland (Czechoslovakia) Helena Suková	2	3
2	(United States) Gigi Fernández (United States) Martina Navratilova	6	6

=== Top half ===
First round
(Switzerland) E Krapl (West Germany) S Meier	4	3
(Argentina) B Fulco (Brazil) A Vieira	6	6
(Australia) T Morton (Bulgaria) E Pampoulova	6	2
(Australia) L Field (Netherlands) N Jagerman	7	6
(France) J Halard (Greece) A Kanellopoulou	1	0
7	(France) N Tauziat (Austria) J Wiesner	6	6
(Switzerland) C Caverzasio (Argentina) F Labat	w/o
(West Germany) C Porwik (West Germany) W Probst
(Sweden) C Dahlman (Netherlands) S Schilder	1	0
(West Germany) A Huber (West Germany) M Kochta	6	6

Second round
1	(Soviet Union) L Savchenko-Neiland (Czechoslovakia) H Suková	6	6
(Argentina) B Fulco (Brazil) A Vieira	2	2
(Australia) L Field (Netherlands) N Jagerman	1	5
7	(France) N Tauziat (Austria) J Wiesner	6	7
3	(Argentina) M Paz (Spain) A Sánchez Vicario	6	6
(Switzerland) C Caverzasio (Argentina) F Labat	2	3
(West Germany) A Huber (West Germany) M Kochta	3	6	2
5	(Soviet Union) N Medvedeva (Soviet Union) L Meskhi	6	3	6

Quarterfinals
1	(Soviet Union) L Savchenko-Neiland (Czechoslovakia) H Suková	3	6	6
7	(France) N Tauziat (Austria) J Wiesner	6	1	0
3	(Argentina) M Paz (Spain) A Sánchez Vicario	6	6
5	(Soviet Union) N Medvedeva (Soviet Union) L Meskhi	4	3

Semifinals
1	(Soviet Union) L Savchenko-Neiland (Czechoslovakia) H Suková	6	6
3	(Argentina) M Paz (Spain) A Sánchez Vicario	3	4

=== Bottom half ===
First round
6	(Italy) S Cecchini (Argentina) P Tarabini	6	7
(Bulgaria) K Maleeva (Bulgaria) M Maleeva	2	5
(France) N Herreman (Sweden) M Strandlund	6	3	6
(West Germany) S Hack (West Germany) S Hanika	2	6	2
(West Germany) S Lohmann (West Germany) Stefanie Rehmke	2	2
(Czechoslovakia) P Langrová (Czechoslovakia) R Zrubáková	6	6
8	(Australia) JA Faull (Australia) R McQuillan	6	6
(West Germany) Julia Mertins (West Germany) C Hoffmann-Timm	0	1
(West Germany) K Düll (West Germany) B Rittner	6	0	1
(France) I Demongeot (France) C Tanvier	4	6	6
(Peru) L Gildemeister (Socialist Federal Republic of Yugoslavia) S Goleš	6	6
(Czechoslovakia) R Rajchrtová (Hungary) A Temesvári-Trunkos	4	2

Second round
6	(Italy) S Cecchini (Argentina) P Tarabini	w/o
(France) N Herreman (Sweden) M Strandlund
(Czechoslovakia) P Langrová (Czechoslovakia) R Zrubáková	2	3
4	(Australia) N Provis (South Africa) E Reinach	6	6
8	(Australia) JA Faull (Australia) R McQuillan	3	6
(France) I Demongeot (France) C Tanvier	6	7
(Peru) L Gildemeister (Socialist Federal Republic of Yugoslavia) S Goleš	1	2
2	(United States) G Fernández (United States) M Navratilova	6	6

Quarterfinals
6	(Italy) S Cecchini (Argentina) P Tarabini	3	3
4	(Australia) N Provis (South Africa) E Reinach	6	6
(France) I Demongeot (France) C Tanvier	1	1
2	(United States) G Fernández (United States) M Navratilova	6	6

Semifinals
4	(Australia) N Provis (South Africa) E Reinach	2	0
2	(United States) G Fernández (United States) M Navratilova	6	6
