= 1990 BMW European Indoors =

- Date: 8–14 October
- Edition: 7th
- Category: Tier II
- Draw: 32S / 16D
- Prize money: $350,000
- Surface: Carpet / indoor
- Location: Zürich, Switzerland
- Venue: Saalsporthalle Allmend

Champions

Singles
- (West Germany) Steffi Graf

Doubles
- (Netherlands) Manon Bollegraf / (West Germany) Eva Pfaff
| ← 1989 · | Zurich Open | · 1991 → |

The 1990 BMW European Indoors was a women's tennis tournament played on indoor carpet courts at the Saalsporthalle Allmend in Zürich in Switzerland and was part of Tier II of the 1990 WTA Tour. It was the seventh edition of the tournament and was held from 8 October through 14 October 1990. First-seeded Steffi Graf won the singles title.

== Finals ==
=== Singles ===
(Germany) Steffi Graf defeated (Argentina) Gabriela Sabatini 6–3, 6–2

- It was Graf's 8th singles title of the year and the 52nd of her career.

=== Doubles ===
(Netherlands) Manon Bollegraf / (Germany) Eva Pfaff defeated (France) Catherine Suire / (South Africa) Dianne Van Rensburg 7–5, 6–4
