= 1991 Citizen Cup =

- Date: 29 April – 5 May
- Edition: 14th
- Category: Tier II
- Draw: 56S / 28D
- Prize money: $350,000
- Surface: Clay / outdoor
- Location: Hamburg, West Germany
- Venue: Am Rothenbaum

Champions

Singles
- (Germany) Steffi Graf

Doubles
- (Czechoslovakia) Jana Novotná / (Soviet Union) Larisa Savchenko
← 1990 ·	WTA Hamburg	· 1992 →

The 1991 Citizen Cup was a women's tennis tournament played on outdoor clay courts at the Am Rothenbaum in Hamburg in West Germany that was part of the Tier II category of the 1991 WTA Tour. It was the 14th edition of the tournament and was held from 29 April until 5 May 1991. Second-seeded Steffi Graf won the singles title, her fifth consecutive at the event.

== Finals ==
=== Singles ===
(Germany) Steffi Graf defeated (Socialist Federal Republic of Yugoslavia) Monica Seles 7–5, 6–7^{(4–7)}, 6–3

- It was Graf's 2nd singles title of the year and the 56th of her career.

=== Doubles ===
(Czechoslovakia) Jana Novotná / (Soviet Union) Larisa Savchenko defeated (Spain) Arantxa Sánchez Vicario / (Czechoslovakia) Helena Suková 7–5, 6–1
