= 1992 Citizen Cup (tennis) =

- Date: 27 April – 3 May
- Edition: 15th
- Category: Tier II
- Draw: 32S / 16D
- Prize money: $350,000
- Surface: Clay / outdoor
- Location: Hamburg, Germany
- Venue: Am Rothenbaum

Champions

Singles
- (Germany) Steffi Graf

Doubles
- (Germany) Steffi Graf / (Australia) Rennae Stubbs
← 1991 ·	WTA Hamburg	· 1993 →

The 1992 Citizen Cup was a women's tennis tournament played on outdoor clay courts at the Am Rothenbaum in Hamburg in Germany that was part of the Tier II category of the 1992 WTA Tour. It was the 15th edition of the tournament and was held from 27 April until 3 May 1992. First-seeded Steffi Graf won the singles title, her sixth consecutive at the event and earned $70,000 first-prize money.

== Finals ==
=== Singles ===
(Germany) Steffi Graf defeated (Spain) Arantxa Sánchez Vicario 7–6^{(7–5)}, 6–2

- It was Graf's 2nd singles title of the year and the 63rd of her career.

=== Doubles ===
(Germany) Steffi Graf / (Australia) Rennae Stubbs defeated (Netherlands) Manon Bollegraf / (Spain) Arantxa Sánchez Vicario 4–6, 6–3, 6–4
