= 1991 Citizen Cup – Singles =

Singles
- 1991 Citizen Cup

Final
- Champion: (Germany) Steffi Graf
- Runner-up: (Socialist Federal Republic of Yugoslavia) Monica Seles
- Score: 7–5, 6–7^{(4–7)}, 6–3

Details
- Draw: 56
- Seeds: 16

Events
Singles	Doubles
← 1990 ·	Hamburg European Open	· 1992 →

Steffi Graf won the tournament for the fifth time in a row after defeating Monica Seles 7–5, 6–7^{(4–7)}, 6–3 in the final.

== Seeds ==
The first eight seeds received a bye into the second round.

1. (Socialist Federal Republic of Yugoslavia) Monica Seles (final)
2. (Germany) Steffi Graf (champion)
3. (Spain) Arantxa Sánchez Vicario (semifinals)
4. (Czechoslovakia) Jana Novotná (quarterfinals)
5. (Bulgaria) Katerina Maleeva (quarterfinals)
6. (Czechoslovakia) Helena Suková (quarterfinals)
7. (Soviet Union) Leila Meskhi (quarterfinals)
8. (Austria) Judith Wiesner (semifinals)
9. (Canada) Helen Kelesi (first round)
10. (Germany) Anke Huber (third round)
11. (Germany) Isabel Cueto (second round)
12. (Czechoslovakia) Eva Švíglerová (first round)
13. (Czechoslovakia) Regina Rajchrtová (third round)
14. (France) Julie Halard (third round)
15. (Sweden) Catarina Lindqvist (third round)
16. (Germany) Wiltrud Probst (first round)

== Draw ==
Key

- Q = Qualifier
- WC = Wild card
- LL = Lucky loser
- Alt = Alternate
- ITF = ITF entry
- PR = Protected ranking
- SR = Special ranking
- SE = Special exempt
- JE = Junior exempt
- JR = Junior Accelerator Programme entrant
- CO = College Accelerator Programme entrant
- NG = Next Gen Accelerator Program entrant
- w/o = Walkover
- r = Retired
- d = Defaulted

=== Finals ===
Quarterfinals
1	(Socialist Federal Republic of Yugoslavia) Monica Seles	6	6
6	(Czechoslovakia) Helena Suková	0	1
3	(Spain) Arantxa Sánchez Vicario	6	6
7	(Soviet Union) Leila Meskhi	2	1
8	(Austria) Judith Wiesner	6	6
4	(Czechoslovakia) Jana Novotná	1	3
5	(Bulgaria) Katerina Maleeva	3	3
2	(Germany) Steffi Graf	6	6

Semifinals
1	(Socialist Federal Republic of Yugoslavia) Monica Seles	6	6
3	(Spain) Arantxa Sánchez Vicario	2	4
8	(Austria) Judith Wiesner	0	1
2	(Germany) Steffi Graf	6	6

Final
1	(Socialist Federal Republic of Yugoslavia) Monica Seles	5	7^{7}	3
2	(Germany) Steffi Graf	7	6^{4}	6

=== Top half ===
==== Section 1 ====
First round
(Germany) E Pfaff	2	6	4
(United States) A Leand	6	2	6
(France) N Guerrée	7^{7}	6
(France) C Tanvier	6^{4}	4
(Australia) M Jaggard	3	1
13	(Czechoslovakia) R Rajchrtová	6	6
16	(Germany) W Probst	6^{3}	1
(Australia) N Provis	7^{7}	6
(Soviet Union) E Brioukhovets	6	6
(Poland) R Baranski	3	0
(Argentina) C Tessi	6	6
(France) K Quentrec	0	1

Second round
1	(Socialist Federal Republic of Yugoslavia) M Seles	6	6
(United States) A Leand	1	1
(France) N Guerrée	2	1^{r}
13	(Czechoslovakia) R Rajchrtová	6	3
(Australia) N Provis	1	4
(Soviet Union) E Brioukhovets	6	6
(Argentina) C Tessi	3	2
6	(Czechoslovakia) H Suková	6	6

Third round
1	(Socialist Federal Republic of Yugoslavia) M Seles	6	6
13	(Czechoslovakia) R Rajchrtová	3	0
(Soviet Union) E Brioukhovets	4	2
6	(Czechoslovakia) H Suková	6	6

Quarterfinals
1	(Socialist Federal Republic of Yugoslavia) M Seles	6	6
6	(Czechoslovakia) H Suková	0	1

==== Section 2 ====
First round
(Czechoslovakia) P Langrová	1	3
(South Africa) E Reinach	6	6
(Sweden) M Strandlund	3	4
(Australia) R McQuillan	6	6
(Germany) B Rittner	5	3
10	(Germany) A Huber	7	6
11	(Germany) I Cueto	6	6
(United Kingdom) S Smith	3	3
(Luxembourg) K Kschwendt	6	2	7^{7}
(Japan) M Kidowaki	1	6	6^{3}
(Germany) C Porwik	6	6
(Netherlands) H ter Riet	4	4

Second round
3	(Spain) A Sánchez Vicario	6	3	6
(South Africa) E Reinach	1	6	2
(Australia) R McQuillan	7^{7}	6^{5}	4
10	(Germany) A Huber	6^{5}	7^{7}	6
11	(Germany) I Cueto	2	2
(Luxembourg) K Kschwendt	6	6
(Germany) C Porwik	4	3
7	(Soviet Union) L Meskhi	6	6

Third round
3	(Spain) A Sánchez Vicario	6	6
10	(Germany) A Huber	2	3
(Luxembourg) K Kschwendt	4	0
7	(Soviet Union) L Meskhi	6	6

Quarterfinals
3	(Spain) A Sánchez Vicario	6	6
7	(Soviet Union) L Meskhi	2	1

=== Bottom half ===
==== Section 3 ====
First round
(Germany) S Meier	6	5	6
(Australia) L Field	3	7	1
(Austria) S Dopfer	7	5	6
(South Africa) A Coetzer	5	7	4
(Peru) P Vásquez	4	4
15	(Sweden) C Lindqvist	6	6
12	(Czechoslovakia) E Švíglerová	2	2
(Argentina) P Tarabini	6	6
(Bulgaria) E Pampoulova	4	6	6
(Germany) M Babel	6	3	2
(Netherlands) N Jagerman	2	2
(Soviet Union) L Savchenko	6	6

Second round
8	(Austria) J Wiesner	6	6
(Germany) S Meier	4	2
(Austria) S Dopfer	3	2
15	(Sweden) C Lindqvist	6	6
(Argentina) P Tarabini	6	4	6
(Bulgaria) E Pampoulova	1	6	1
(Soviet Union) L Savchenko	0	1
4	(Czechoslovakia) J Novotná	6	6

Third round
8	(Austria) J Wiesner	6	6
15	(Sweden) C Lindqvist	2	1
(Argentina) P Tarabini
4	(Czechoslovakia) J Novotná	w/o

Quarterfinals
8	(Austria) J Wiesner	6	6
4	(Czechoslovakia) J Novotná	1	3

==== Section 4 ====
First round
(Germany) S Frankl	6	6
(Brazil) L Corsato	2	4
(New Zealand) C Toleafoa	2	0
(Czechoslovakia) D Szabová	6	6
(Czechoslovakia) R Zrubáková	6	6
9	(Canada) H Kelesi	4	1
14	(France) J Halard	6	6
(Switzerland) C Cohen	0	3
(Argentina) B Fulco	6	0	2
(Canada) R Simpson-Alter	2	6	6
(Germany) M Kochta	7^{10}	6
(Hungary) A Temesvári	6^{8}	4

Second round
5	(Bulgaria) K Maleeva	6	6
(Germany) S Frankl	2	2
(Czechoslovakia) D Szabová	3	6	3
(Czechoslovakia) R Zrubáková	6	4	6
14	(France) J Halard	2	6	6
(Canada) R Simpson-Alter	6	1	2
(Germany) M Kochta	1	3
2	(Germany) S Graf	6	6

Third round
5	(Bulgaria) K Maleeva	6	6
(Czechoslovakia) R Zrubáková	3	0
14	(France) J Halard	2	3
2	(Germany) S Graf	6	6

Quarterfinals
5	(Bulgaria) K Maleeva	3	3
2	(Germany) S Graf	6	6
