= 1992 Citizen Cup – Doubles =

Doubles
- 1992 Citizen Cup

Final
- Champions: (Germany) Steffi Graf (Australia) Rennae Stubbs
- Runners-up: (Netherlands) Manon Bollegraf (Spain) Arantxa Sánchez Vicario
- Score: 4–6, 6–3, 6–4

Details
- Draw: 16 (1WC)
- Seeds: 4

Events
Singles	Doubles
← 1991 ·	Hamburg European Open	· 1993 →

Jana Novotná and Larisa Savchenko-Neiland were the defending champions, but lost in the quarterfinals to Steffi Graf and Rennae Stubbs.

Graf and Stubbs won the title by defeating Manon Bollegraf and Arantxa Sánchez Vicario 4–6, 6–3, 6–4 in the final.

== Seeds ==
1. (Czechoslovakia) Jana Novotná / (Commonwealth of Independent States) Larisa Savchenko-Neiland (quarterfinals)
2. (Netherlands) Manon Bollegraf / (Spain) Arantxa Sánchez Vicario (final)
3. (Commonwealth of Independent States) Leila Meskhi / (Argentina) Mercedes Paz (semifinals)
4. (United Kingdom) Jo Durie / (Australia) Nicole Provis (first round)

== Draw ==
Key

- Q = Qualifier
- WC = Wild card
- LL = Lucky loser
- Alt = Alternate
- ITF = ITF entry
- PR = Protected ranking
- SR = Special ranking
- SE = Special exempt
- JE = Junior exempt
- JR = Junior Accelerator Programme entrant
- CO = College Accelerator Programme entrant
- NG = Next Gen Accelerator Program entrant
- w/o = Walkover
- r = Retired
- d = Defaulted

=== Draw ===
First round
1	(Czechoslovakia) J Novotná (Commonwealth of Independent States) L Savchenko-Neiland	6	6
(Germany) M Kochta (Germany) C Schneider	2	2
WC	(Germany) S Graf (Australia) R Stubbs	0	6	6
(Germany) E Pfaff (Germany) B Rittner	6	3	2
3	(Commonwealth of Independent States) L Meskhi (Argentina) M Paz	6	6
(United States) D Graham (Canada) P Hy	3	2
(Switzerland) M Maleeva-Fragnière (Austria) J Wiesner	3	3
(Germany) A Huber (Bulgaria) M Maleeva	6	6
(Commonwealth of Independent States) E Maniokova (Finland) P Thorén	6^{4}	7^{7}	2
(Australia) JA Faull (Argentina) B Fulco Villella	7^{7}	6^{4}	6
(Netherlands) N Muns-Jagerman (Germany) W Probst	6	6
4	(United Kingdom) J Durie (Australia) N Provis	4	2
(Italy) S Cecchini (France) A Dechaume	6	6
(Germany) M Babel (Czechoslovakia) R Rajchrtová	3	3
(Commonwealth of Independent States) E Brioukhovets (Germany) S Lohmann	1	4
2	(Netherlands) M Bollegraf (Spain) A Sánchez Vicario	6	6

Quarterfinals
1	(Czechoslovakia) J Novotná (Commonwealth of Independent States) L Savchenko-Neiland	3	3
WC	(Germany) S Graf (Australia) R Stubbs	6	6
3	(Commonwealth of Independent States) L Meskhi (Argentina) M Paz	6	6
(Germany) A Huber (Bulgaria) M Maleeva	3	2
(Australia) JA Faull (Argentina) B Fulco Villella	6	6
(Netherlands) N Muns-Jagerman (Germany) W Probst	3	1
(Italy) S Cecchini (France) A Dechaume	2	2
2	(Netherlands) M Bollegraf (Spain) A Sánchez Vicario	6	6

Semifinals
WC	(Germany) S Graf (Australia) R Stubbs	6	6
3	(Commonwealth of Independent States) L Meskhi (Argentina) M Paz	3	1
(Australia) JA Faull (Argentina) B Fulco Villella	2	2
2	(Netherlands) M Bollegraf (Spain) A Sánchez Vicario	6	6

Final
WC	(Germany) S Graf (Australia) R Stubbs	4	6	6
2	(Netherlands) M Bollegraf (Spain) A Sánchez Vicario	6	3	4
