= 1992 Citizen Cup – Singles =

Singles
- 1992 Citizen Cup

Final
- Champion: (Germany) Steffi Graf
- Runner-up: (Spain) Arantxa Sánchez Vicario
- Score: 7–6^{(7–5)}, 6–2

Details
- Draw: 32 (2WC)
- Seeds: 8

Events
Singles	Doubles
← 1991 ·	Hamburg European Open	· 1993 →

Steffi Graf won the tournament for the sixth time in a row after defeating Arantxa Sánchez Vicario 7–6^{(7–5)}, 6–2 in the final, claiming the 63rd title in her singles career.

== Seeds ==
1. (Germany) Steffi Graf (champion)
2. (Argentina) Gabriela Sabatini (semifinals)
3. (Spain) Arantxa Sánchez Vicario (final)
4. (Switzerland) Manuela Maleeva-Fragnière (quarterfinals)
5. (Czechoslovakia) Jana Novotná (quarterfinals)
6. (Germany) Anke Huber (semifinals)
7. (Austria) Judith Wiesner (quarterfinals)
8. (Commonwealth of Independent States) Leila Meskhi (quarterfinals)

== Draw ==
Key

- Q = Qualifier
- WC = Wild card
- LL = Lucky loser
- Alt = Alternate
- ITF = ITF entry
- PR = Protected ranking
- SR = Special ranking
- SE = Special exempt
- JE = Junior exempt
- JR = Junior Accelerator Programme entrant
- CO = College Accelerator Programme entrant
- NG = Next Gen Accelerator Program entrant
- w/o = Walkover
- r = Retired
- d = Defaulted

=== Finals ===
Semifinals
1	(Germany) Steffi Graf	6	6
6	(Germany) Anke Huber	3	0
3	(Spain) Arantxa Sánchez Vicario	6	4	4
2	(Argentina) Gabriela Sabatini	3	6	6

Final
1	(Germany) Steffi Graf	7^{7}	6
2	(Argentina) Gabriela Sabatini	6^{5}	2

=== Top half ===
First round
1	(Germany) S Graf	6	7^{7}
(United States) D Graham	0	6^{3}
(Australia) N Provis	3	6	6^{3}
(Bulgaria) M Maleeva	6	4	7^{7}
WC	(Germany) S Lohmann	0	3
(France) N van Lottum	6	6
(Netherlands) N Muns-Jagerman	2	6	4
8	(Commonwealth of Independent States) L Meskhi	6	4	6
4	(Switzerland) M Maleeva-Fragnière	6	2	6
(Argentina) M Paz	1	6	0
WC	(Germany) M Babel	6	6
(Czechoslovakia) D Szabová	4	1
(Netherlands) M Bollegraf	3	2
(United Kingdom) J Durie	6	6
(Czechoslovakia) R Rajchrtová	6^{5}	3
6	(Germany) A Huber	7^{7}	6

Second round
1	(Germany) S Graf	6	6
(Bulgaria) M Maleeva	2	3
(France) N van Lottum	5	0
8	(Commonwealth of Independent States) L Meskhi	7	6
4	(Switzerland) M Maleeva-Fragnière	6	6
WC	(Germany) M Babel	3	0
(United Kingdom) J Durie	3	2
6	(Germany) A Huber	6	6

Quarterfinals
1	(Germany) S Graf	6	6
8	(Commonwealth of Independent States) L Meskhi	2	2
4	(Switzerland) M Maleeva-Fragnière	7	2	5
6	(Germany) A Huber	5	6	7

Semifinals
1	(Germany) S Graf	6	6
6	(Germany) A Huber	3	0

=== Bottom half ===
First round
5	(Czechoslovakia) J Novotná	6	6
(Commonwealth of Independent States) E Brioukhovets	3	2
(Poland) K Nowak	2	3
(Canada) P Hy	6	6
(Commonwealth of Independent States) E Maniokova	6	6
(France) A Dechaume	2	2
(Commonwealth of Independent States) L Savchenko-Neiland	0	4
3	(Spain) A Sánchez Vicario	6	6
7	(Austria) J Wiesner	3	6	6
(Argentina) B Fulco	6	2	1
(Germany) C Hofmann	2	4
(Germany) M Kochta	6	6
(Finland) P Thoren	2	2
(Germany) B Rittner	6	6
(Italy) S Cecchini	0	0
2	(Argentina) G Sabatini	6	6

Second round
5	(Czechoslovakia) J Novotná	6	6
(Canada) P Hy	2	2
(Commonwealth of Independent States) E Maniokova	1	1
3	(Spain) A Sánchez Vicario	6	6
7	(Austria) J Wiesner	7^{7}	6
(Germany) M Kochta	6^{4}	3
(Germany) B Rittner	1	1
2	(Argentina) G Sabatini	6	6

Quarterfinals
5	(Czechoslovakia) J Novotná	1	4
3	(Spain) A Sánchez Vicario	6	6
7	(Austria) J Wiesner	1	2
2	(Argentina) G Sabatini	6	6

Semifinals
3	(Spain) A Sánchez Vicario	6	4	4
2	(Argentina) G Sabatini	3	6	6
