= 1990 Citizen Cup =

- Date: 30 April – 6 May
- Edition: 13th
- Category: Tier II
- Draw: 56S / 27D
- Prize money: $350,000
- Surface: Clay / outdoor
- Location: Hamburg, West Germany
- Venue: Am Rothenbaum

Champions

Singles
- (West Germany) Steffi Graf

Doubles
- (United States) Gigi Fernández (United States) Martina Navratilova
← 1989 ·	WTA Hamburg	· 1991 →

The 1990 Citizen Cup was a women's tennis tournament played on outdoor clay courts at the Am Rothenbaum in Hamburg in West Germany that was part of the Tier II category of the 1990 WTA Tour. It was the 13th edition of the tournament and was held from 30 April until 6 May 1990. First-seeded Steffi Graf won the singles title, her fourth consecutive at the event.

== Finals ==
=== Singles ===
(West Germany) Steffi Graf defeated (Spain) Arantxa Sánchez Vicario 5–7, 6–0, 6–1

- It was Graf's 4th singles title of the year and the 48th of her career.

=== Doubles ===
(United States) Gigi Fernández / (United States) Martina Navratilova defeated (Soviet Union) Larisa Savchenko-Neiland / (Czechoslovakia) Helena Suková 6–2, 6–3
