= 1987 Citizen Cup =

- Date: 21–27 September
- Edition: 10th
- Category: Virginia Slims (Category 3)
- Draw: 56S / 28D
- Prize money: $150,000
- Surface: Clay / outdoor
- Location: Hamburg, West Germany
- Venue: Am Rothenbaum

Champions

Singles
- (West Germany) Steffi Graf

Doubles
- (West Germany) Claudia Kohde-Kilsch (Czechoslovakia) Jana Novotná
| ← 1983 · | WTA Hamburg | · 1988 → |

The 1987 Citizen Cup was a women's tennis tournament played on outdoor clay courts at the Am Rothenbaum in Hamburg, West Germany and was part of the Category 3 tier of the 1987 Virginia Slims World Championship Series. It was the 10th edition of the tournament and ran from 21 September until 27 September 1987. First-seeded Steffi Graf won the singles title.

== Finals ==
=== Singles ===
(West Germany) Steffi Graf defeated (West Germany) Isabel Cueto 6–2, 6–2

- It was Graf's 9th singles title of the year and the 17th of her career.

=== Doubles ===
(West Germany) Claudia Kohde-Kilsch / (Czechoslovakia) Jana Novotná defeated (Soviet Union) Natalia Bykova / (Soviet Union) Leila Meskhi 7–6^{(7–1)}, 7–6^{(8–6)}
