= 1988 European Indoors =

- Date: 17–23 October
- Edition: 5th
- Category: Category 3
- Draw: 32S / 16D
- Prize money: $200,000
- Surface: Carpet / indoor
- Location: Zürich, Switzerland
- Venue: Saalsporthalle Allmend

Champions

Singles
- (United States) Pam Shriver

Doubles
- (France) Isabelle Demongeot (France) Nathalie Tauziat
← 1987 ·	Zurich Open	· 1989 →

The 1988 European Indoors was a women's tennis tournament played on indoor carpet courts at the Saalsporthalle Allmend in Zürich in Switzerland and was part of the Category 3 of the 1988 WTA Tour. It was the fifth edition of the tournament and was held from 17 October through 23 October 1988. First-seeded Pam Shriver won the singles title and earned $40,000 first-prize money.

== Finals ==
=== Singles ===
(United States) Pam Shriver defeated (Bulgaria) Manuela Maleeva 6–3, 6–4

- It was Shriver's 3rd and last singles title of the year and the 21st and last of her career.

=== Doubles ===
(France) Isabelle Demongeot / (France) Nathalie Tauziat defeated (West Germany) Claudia Kohde-Kilsch / (Czechoslovakia) Helena Suková 6–3, 6–3

- It was Demongeot's 2nd title of the year and the 3rd of her career. It was Tauziat's 2nd title of the year and the 3rd of her career.

== Prize money and ranking points ==
Event		W	F	SF	QF	Round of 16	Round of 32
Singles	Prize money	$40,000	$18,000	$9,000	$4,500	$2,300	$1,225
Singles	Ranking points (Note: Called Virginia Slims points.)	240	170	110	55	30	14
