= 1991 Citizen Cup – Doubles =

Doubles
- 1991 Citizen Cup

Final
- Champions: (Czechoslovakia) Jana Novotná (Soviet Union) Larisa Savchenko
- Runners-up: (Spain) Arantxa Sánchez Vicario (Czechoslovakia) Helena Suková
- Score: 7–5, 6–1

Details
- Draw: 28
- Seeds: 8

Events
Singles	Doubles
← 1990 ·	Hamburg European Open	· 1992 →

Gigi Fernández and Martina Navratilova were the defending champions, but none competed this year.

Jana Novotná and Larisa Savchenko won the title by defeating Arantxa Sánchez Vicario and Helena Suková 7–5, 6–1 in the final.

== Seeds ==
The first four seeds received a bye into the second round.

1. (Czechoslovakia) Jana Novotná / (Soviet Union) Larisa Savchenko (champions)
2. (Spain) Arantxa Sánchez Vicario / (Czechoslovakia) Helena Suková (final)
3. (Australia) Nicole Provis / (South Africa) Elna Reinach (quarterfinals)
4. (Soviet Union) Elena Brioukhovets / (Soviet Union) Leila Meskhi (quarterfinals)
5. (Australia) Michelle Jaggard / (Germany) Eva Pfaff (first round)
6. (Australia) Rachel McQuillan / (France) Catherine Tanvier (semifinals)
7. (Sweden) Catarina Lindqvist / (Bulgaria) Katerina Maleeva (first round)
8. (Argentina) Patricia Tarabini / (Hungary) Andrea Temesvári (second round, withdrew)

== Draw ==
Key

- Q = Qualifier
- WC = Wild card
- LL = Lucky loser
- Alt = Alternate
- ITF = ITF entry
- PR = Protected ranking
- SR = Special ranking
- SE = Special exempt
- JE = Junior exempt
- JR = Junior Accelerator Programme entrant
- CO = College Accelerator Programme entrant
- NG = Next Gen Accelerator Program entrant
- w/o = Walkover
- r = Retired
- d = Defaulted

=== Finals ===
Semifinals
1	(Czechoslovakia) Jana Novotná (Soviet Union) Larisa Savchenko	6	6
(Japan) Maya Kidowaki (Luxembourg) Karin Kschwendt	1	3
6	(Australia) Rachel McQuillan (France) Catherine Tanvier	3	6^{5}
2	(Spain) Arantxa Sánchez Vicario (Czechoslovakia) Helena Suková	6	7^{7}

Final
1	(Czechoslovakia) Jana Novotná (Soviet Union) Larisa Savchenko	7	6
2	(Spain) Arantxa Sánchez Vicario (Czechoslovakia) Helena Suková	5	1

=== Top half ===
First round
(United Kingdom) S Smith (Netherlands) H ter Riet	w/o
(Brazil) L Corsato (New Zealand) C Toleafoa
(Sweden) M Lindström (Sweden) M Strandlund	3	1
(Czechoslovakia) P Langrová (Czechoslovakia) R Zrubáková	6	6
(Germany) W Probst (Austria) J Wiesner	6	6
7	(Sweden) C Lindqvist (Bulgaria) K Maleeva	4	4
(Canada) H Kelesi (Czechoslovakia) R Rajchrtová	7^{7}	6
(Mexico) L Novelo (Australia) C Thompson	6^{4}	2
(Germany) A Huber (Germany) B Rittner	4	4
(South Africa) A Coetzer (Australia) L Field	6	6
(Japan) M Kidowaki (Luxembourg) K Kschwendt	6	7^{7}
5	(Australia) M Jaggard (Germany) E Pfaff	1	6^{4}

Second round
1	(Czechoslovakia) J Novotná (Soviet Union) L Savchenko	6	6
(United Kingdom) S Smith (Netherlands) H ter Riet	3	2
(Czechoslovakia) P Langrová (Czechoslovakia) R Zrubáková	6	6
(Germany) W Probst (Austria) J Wiesner	0	1
3	(Australia) N Provis (South Africa) E Reinach	4	6	6
(Canada) H Kelesi (Czechoslovakia) R Rajchrtová	6	4	2
(South Africa) A Coetzer (Australia) L Field	5	2
(Japan) M Kidowaki (Luxembourg) K Kschwendt	7	6

Quarterfinals
1	(Czechoslovakia) J Novotná (Soviet Union) L Savchenko	6	6
(Czechoslovakia) P Langrová (Czechoslovakia) R Zrubáková	3	1
3	(Australia) N Provis (South Africa) E Reinach	5	6	0
(Japan) M Kidowaki (Luxembourg) K Kschwendt	7	2	6

Semifinals
1	(Czechoslovakia) J Novotná (Soviet Union) L Savchenko	6	6
(Japan) M Kidowaki (Luxembourg) K Kschwendt	1	3

=== Bottom half ===
First round
6	(Australia) R McQuillan (France) C Tanvier	7	6
(Germany) M Babel (Germany) M Kochta	5	4
(Netherlands) C Bakkum (Netherlands) N Jagerman	6	6
(Switzerland) C Cohen (Germany) Maja Wittke	2	2
(Netherlands) Susan Gadroen (Netherlands) Jackie van Wijk	4	2
(Bulgaria) E Pampoulova (Czechoslovakia) E Švíglerová	6	6
8	(Argentina) P Tarabini (Hungary) A Temesvári	7^{7}	4	6
(Germany) S Meier (Canada) R Simpson-Alter	6^{5}	6	3
(Finland) A Aallonen (Germany) Stefanie Rehmke	4	7^{9}	2
(Poland) R Baranski (Argentina) B Fulco	6	6^{7}	6
(Germany) S Frankl (Argentina) C Tessi	2	4
(Germany) S Lohmann (Germany) C Schneider	6	6

Second round
6	(Australia) R McQuillan (France) C Tanvier	7^{7}	6
(Netherlands) C Bakkum (Netherlands) N Jagerman	6^{3}	4
(Bulgaria) E Pampoulova (Czechoslovakia) E Švíglerová	5	3
4	(Soviet Union) E Brioukhovets (Soviet Union) L Meskhi	7	6
8	(Argentina) P Tarabini (Hungary) A Temesvári
(Poland) R Baranski (Argentina) B Fulco	w/o
(Germany) S Lohmann (Germany) C Schneider	1	4
2	(Spain) A Sánchez Vicario (Czechoslovakia) H Suková	6	6

Quarterfinals
6	(Australia) R McQuillan (France) C Tanvier	6	7^{11}
4	(Soviet Union) E Brioukhovets (Soviet Union) L Meskhi	1	6^{9}
(Poland) R Baranski (Argentina) B Fulco	1	4
2	(Spain) A Sánchez Vicario (Czechoslovakia) H Suková	6	6

Semifinals
6	(Australia) R McQuillan (France) C Tanvier	3	6^{5}
2	(Spain) A Sánchez Vicario (Czechoslovakia) H Suková	6	7^{7}
