= 1989 Citizen Cup =

- Date: 1–7 May
- Edition: 12th
- Category: Category 3
- Draw: 56S / 24D
- Prize money: $200,000
- Surface: Clay / outdoor
- Location: Hamburg, West Germany
- Venue: Am Rothenbaum

Champions

Singles
- (West Germany) Steffi Graf

Doubles
- (France) Isabelle Demongeot (France) Nathalie Tauziat
← 1988 ·	WTA Hamburg	· 1990 →

The 1989 Citizen Cup was a tennis tournament played on outdoor clay courts at the Am Rothenbaum in Hamburg in West Germany that was part of the Category 3 tier of the 1989 WTA Tour. It was the 12th edition of the edition of the tournament and was held from 1 May until 7 May 1989. First-seeded Steffi Graf won the singles title, her third consecutive at the event. Both the singles and doubles finals were cancelled after Jana Novotná was forced to default as a result of an injury to her right ankle which she sustained during her singles semifinal match against Arantxa Sánchez Vicario.

== Finals ==
=== Singles ===
(West Germany) Steffi Graf defeated (Czechoslovakia) Jana Novotná by walkover

- It was Graf's 6th singles title of the year and the 36th of her career.

=== Doubles ===
(France) Isabelle Demongeot / (France) Nathalie Tauziat defeated (Czechoslovakia) Jana Novotná / (Czechoslovakia) Helena Suková by walkover

- It was Demongeot's only title of the year and the 4th of her career. It was Tauziat's only title of the year and the 4th of her career.
