= 1987 European Indoors =

- Date: 26 October – 1 November
- Edition: 4th
- Category: Category 3
- Draw: 32S / 16D
- Prize money: $150,000
- Surface: Carpet / indoor
- Location: Zürich, Switzerland
- Venue: Saalsporthalle Allmend

Champions

Singles
- (West Germany) Steffi Graf

Doubles
- (France) Nathalie Herreman (France) Pascale Paradis
← 1986 ·	Zurich Open	· 1988 →

The 1987 European Indoor Championships was a women's tennis tournament played on indoor carpet courts at the Saalsporthalle Allmend in Zürich in Switzerland and was part of the Category 3 tier of the 1987 WTA Tour. It was the fourth edition of the tournament and was held from 26 October until 1 November 1987. First-seeded Steffi Graf won her second successive singles title and earned $30,000 first-prize money and 210 Virginia Slims points.

== Finals ==
=== Singles ===
(West Germany) Steffi Graf defeated (Czechoslovakia) Hana Mandlíková 6–2, 6–2

- It was Graf's 10th singles title of the year and the 18th of her career.

=== Doubles ===
(France) Nathalie Herreman / (France) Pascale Paradis defeated (Czechoslovakia) Jana Novotná / (France) Catherine Suire 6–3, 2–6, 6–3

- It was Herreman's 1st doubles title of her career. It was Paradis' 1st title of the year and the 2nd of her career.
