= Pamela Wallenfels =

German tennis player

- Country (sports): West Germany; Germany
- Born: 31 May 1971 (age 53)
- Prize money: $12,215

Singles
- Career record: 24–34
- Highest ranking: No. 208 (7 Nov 1988)

Doubles
- Career record: 9–17
- Highest ranking: No. 239 (1 Aug 1988)

Pamela Wallenfels (born 31 May 1971) is a German former professional tennis player.

Wallenfels, a West German World Youth Cup representative, started on the professional tour in the late 1980s. She reached a career high singles ranking of 208 in the world during her career. Her WTA Tour appearances include a first round win over Veronika Martinek at the 1988 Citizen Cup in Hamburg.

Following her professional career she played collegiate tennis for Pepperdine University, from 1992 to 1995.

== ITF finals ==
=== Singles: 1 (0–1) ===
Outcome	No.	Date	Tournament	Surface	Opponent	Score
Runner-up	1.	1 October 1989	Cerignola, Italy	Clay	(Italy) Giovanna Carotenuto	6–3, 6–7, 3–6
