= 1983 Fila Europa Cup =

- Date: 4–10 July
- Edition: 2nd
- Category: Virginia Slims (Category 2)
- Draw: 32S / 16D
- Prize money: $100,000
- Surface: Clay / outdoor
- Location: Hamburg, West Germany

Champions

Singles
- (Hungary) Andrea Temesvári

Doubles
- (West Germany) Bettina Bunge / (West Germany) Claudia Kohde-Kilsch
| ← 1982 · | WTA Hamburg | · 1987 → |

The 1983 Fila Europa Cup was a women's tennis tournament played on outdoor clay courts in Hamburg, West Germany that was part of the Category 2 tier of the 1983 Virginia Slims World Championship Series. It was the second edition of the tournament and was held from 4 July through 10 July 1983. First-seeded Andrea Temesvári won the singles title.

== Finals ==
=== Singles ===
(Hungary) Andrea Temesvári defeated (West Germany) Eva Pfaff 6–4, 6–2

- It was Temesvari's 2nd singles title of the year and the 3rd of her career.

=== Doubles ===
(West Germany) Bettina Bunge / (West Germany) Claudia Kohde-Kilsch defeated (Argentina) Ivanna Madruga-Osses / (France) Catherine Tanvier 7–5 6–4

- It was Bunge's 2nd title of the year and the 5th of her career. It was Kohde-Kilsch's 2nd title of the year and the 6th of her career.
