= 1988 Citizen Cup =

- Date: 25–31 July
- Edition: 11th
- Category: Category 3
- Draw: 56S / 28D
- Prize money: $200,000
- Location: Hamburg, West Germany
- Venue: Am Rothenbaum

Champions

Singles
- (West Germany) Steffi Graf

Doubles
- (Czechoslovakia) Jana Novotná / (Denmark) Tine Scheuer-Larsen
← 1987 ·	WTA Hamburg	· 1989 →

The 1988 Citizen Cup was a women's tennis tournament played on outdoor clay courts at the Am Rothenbaum in Hamburg, West Germany and was part of the Category 3 tier of the 1988 WTA Tour. The tournament ran from July 25 through July 31, 1988. First-seeded Steffi Graf won the singles title, her second consecutive at the event, and earned $40,000 first-prize money.

== Finals ==
=== Singles ===
(West Germany) Steffi Graf defeated (Bulgaria) Katerina Maleeva 6–4, 6–2

- It was Graf's 7th singles title of the year and the 26th of her career.

=== Doubles ===
(Czechoslovakia) Jana Novotná / (Denmark) Tine Scheuer-Larsen defeated (West Germany) Andrea Betzner / (Austria) Judith Wiesner 6–4, 6–2

- It was Novotná's 3rd title of the year and the 6th of her career. It was Scheuer-Larsen's 2nd title of the year and the 4th of her career.
