= Martina Pawlik =

German tennis player

- Full name: Martina Pawlik
- Country (sports): West Germany; Germany
- Born: 8 December 1969 (age 55)
- Prize money: $81,933

Singles
- Career record: 92–74
- Career titles: 4 ITF
- Highest ranking: No. 106 (14 August 1989)

Grand Slam singles results
- Australian Open: 1R (1989, 1990)
- French Open: 3R (1989)
- Wimbledon: 2R (1989)
- US Open: 1R (1989)

Doubles
- Career record: 64–47
- Career titles: 6 ITF
- Highest ranking: No. 129 (11 June 1990)

Grand Slam doubles results
- Australian Open: 2R (1990)

Martina Pawlik (born 8 December 1969) is a former professional tennis player from Germany.

== Biography ==
Pawlik, who began competing on tour in 1986, won two ITF singles titles in the 1988 season, including a $25,000 event held in Chicago.

Her best performance on the WTA Tour was a quarterfinal appearance at the 1989 Fernleaf Classic in Wellington.

In 1989, she reached a career high 106 in the world and appeared that year in the main draw of all four Grand Slam tournaments. She made the third round of the 1989 French Open, where she beat world No. 35, Terry Phelps, and Japan's Kimiko Date, before losing in three sets to ninth seed Katerina Maleeva.

She appeared for the last time on the WTA Tour in 1990 but continued to play in the occasional ITF event. In 1991 she won a $25k tournament in Darmstadt as a qualifier, with wins over the top three seeds en route to the title.

== ITF Circuit finals ==
$25,000 tournaments
$10,000 tournaments

=== Singles (4–3) ===
Result	No.	Date	Tournament	Surface	Opponent	Score
Loss	1.	10 August 1987	ITF Darmstadt, West Germany	Clay	(West Germany) Sabine Auer	5–7, 2–6
Loss	2.	26 October 1987	ITF Cheshire, United Kingdom	Carpet (i)	(France) Karine Quentrec	2–6, 4–6
Win	1.	1 February 1988	ITF Tapiola, Finland	Hard (i)	(Sweden) Maria Ekstrand	6–4, 6–4
Win	2.	19 September 1988	ITF Chicago, United States	Hard	(France) Sophie Amiach	6–1, 7–5
Loss	3.	3 October 1988	ITF Corpus Christi, United States	Hard	(United States) Shaun Stafford	3–6, ret.
Win	3.	15 July 1991	ITF Darmstadt, Germany	Clay	(Germany) Maja Živec-Škulj	1–6, 6–3, 7–6
Win	4.	8 August 1994	ITF Paderborn, Germany	Clay	(Germany) Mirela Vladulescu	7–6^{(2)}, 6–4

=== Doubles (6–1) ===
Result	No.	Date	Tournament	Surface	Partner	Opponents	Score
Win	1.	4 August 1986	ITF Rheda, West Germany	Clay	(West Germany) Eva-Maria Schürhoff	(United States) Vicki Beggs (West Germany) Cornelia Dries	6–3, 6–3
Win	2.	22 June 1987	ITF Francaville, Italy	Clay	(Australia) Kate McDonald	(Australia) Michelle Bowrey (Australia) Kristine Kunce	6–4, 6–3
Win	3.	7 September 1987	ITF Madeira, Portugal	Clay	(West Germany) Veronika Martinek	(Australia) Jackie Masters (New Zealand) Michelle Parun	6–2, 6–4
Win	4.	5 September 1988	ITF Porto, Portugal	Clay	(Switzerland) Sandrine Jaquet	(Sweden) Cecilia Dahlman (Sweden) Helena Dahlström	6–3, 6–1
Win	5.	7 January 1991	ITF Bamberg, Germany	Carpet (i)	(Germany) Steffi Menning	(Germany) Sabine Auer (Germany) Heike Thoms	6–4, 6–7, 6–3
Loss	1.	15 July 1991	ITF Darmstadt, Germany	Clay	(United States) Lisa Seemann	(Australia) Louise Stacey (Australia) Angie Woolcock	1–6, 2–6
Win	6.	20 February 1995	ITF Carvoeiro, Portugal	Hard	(Germany) Renata Kochta	(Italy) Katia Altilia (Spain) Paula Hermida	7–5, 6–4
