= Tanja Weigl =

German tennis player

- Country (sports): West Germany
- Born: 14 December 1970 (age 54)
- Prize money: $11,514

Singles
- Career record: 28–25
- Career titles: 1 ITF
- Highest ranking: No. 205 (19 June 1989)

Tanja Weigl (born 14 December 1970) is a German former professional tennis player.

Weigl was a top player in junior tennis, ending 1987 as the third ranked junior in the world. On the professional tour she reached a career high singles ranking of 205 and made the second round of the 1988 Citizen Cup in Hamburg.

== ITF finals ==
$25,000 tournaments
$10,000 tournaments

=== Singles: 2 (1–1) ===
Result	No.	Date	Tournament	Surface	Opponent	Score
Win	1.	9 August 1987	Rheda, West Germany	Clay	(West Germany) Sabine Auer	6–4, 6–2
Loss	2.	17 July 1988	Erlangen, West Germany	Clay	(West Germany) Heike Thoms	6–4, 4–6, 3–6
