= 1991 BMW European Indoors =

- Date: 7–13 October
- Edition: 8th
- Category: Tier II
- Draw: 32S / 16D
- Prize money: $350,000
- Surface: Carpet / indoor
- Location: Zürich, Switzerland
- Venue: Saalsporthalle Allmend

Champions

Singles
- (West Germany) Steffi Graf

Doubles
- (Czechoslovakia) Jana Novotná / (Czechoslovakia) Andrea Strnadová
- Zurich Open

The 1991 BMW European Indoors was a women's tennis tournament played on indoor carpet courts at the Saalsporthalle Allmend in Zürich in Switzerland and was part of Tier II of the 1991 WTA Tour. It was the eighth edition of the tournament and was held from 7 October through 13 October 1991. First-seeded Steffi Graf won the singles title, her fifth at the event, and earned $70,000 first-prize money.

== Finals ==
=== Singles ===
(West Germany) Steffi Graf defeated (France) Nathalie Tauziat 6–4, 6–4

- It was Graf's 6th singles title of the year and the 60th of her career.

=== Doubles ===
(Czechoslovakia) Jana Novotná / (Czechoslovakia) Andrea Strnadová defeated (United States) Zina Garrison-Jackson / (United States) Lori McNeil 6–4, 6–3
