= 1989 European Indoors =

- Date: 16–22 October
- Edition: 6th
- Category: Category 4
- Draw: 32S / 16D
- Prize money: $250,000
- Surface: Carpet / indoor
- Location: Zürich, Switzerland
- Venue: Saalsporthalle Allmend

Champions

Singles
- (West Germany) Steffi Graf

Doubles
- (Czechoslovakia) Jana Novotná / (Czechoslovakia) Helena Suková
← 1988 ·	Zurich Open	· 1990 →

The 1989 European Indoors was a women's tennis tournament played on indoor carpet courts at the Saalsporthalle Allmend in Zürich in Switzerland and was part of the Category 4 of the 1989 WTA Tour. It was the sixth edition of the tournament and was held from 16 October through 22 October 1989. First-seeded Steffi Graf won the singles title and earned $50,000 first-prize money.

== Finals ==
=== Singles ===
(West Germany) Steffi Graf defeated (Czechoslovakia) Jana Novotná 6–1, 7–6^{(8–6)}

- It was Graf's 12th singles title of the year and the 42nd of her career.

=== Doubles ===
(Czechoslovakia) Jana Novotná / (Czechoslovakia) Helena Suková defeated (France) Nathalie Tauziat / (Austria) Judith Wiesner 6–3, 3–6, 6–4

== Prize money and ranking points ==
Event		W	F	SF	QF	Round of 16	Round of 32
Singles	Prize money	$50,000	$22,500	$11,250	$6,050	$3,400	$2,100
Singles	Ranking points (Note: Called Virginia Slims points.)	240	170	110	55	30	14
