= Steffi Menning =

German tennis player

- Country (sports): West Germany; Germany
- Born: 2 January 1971 (age 54); Oberstdorf, Bavaria, West Germany
- Retired: 1992
- Prize money: $32,292

Singles
- Career record: 54-45
- Career titles: 1 ITF
- Highest ranking: No. 188 (31 July 1989)

Grand Slam singles results
- Australian Open: 1R (1990)

Doubles
- Career record: 8-9
- Career titles: 1 ITF
- Highest ranking: No. 393 (23 October 1989)

Steffi Menning (born 2 January 1971) is a German former professional tennis player.

Menning, who was born in Oberstdorf, was an Orange Bowl doubles finalist in 1987 and won the 1988 German National Indoor Championships.

On the professional tour, she reached a best singles ranking of 188 in the world. She qualified for the main draw of the 1990 Australian Open and was beaten in the first round by Audra Keller, in three sets.

== ITF finals ==
=== Singles (1–0) ===
Legend
$10,000 tournaments

Result	No.	Date	Tournament	Surface	Opponent	Score
Win	1.	8 February 1988	Stavanger, Norway	Carpet	(Sweden) Maria Strandlund	6–4, 6–7, 6–4

=== Doubles (1–0) ===
Result	No.	Date	Tournament	Surface	Partner	Opponents	Score
Win	1.	7 January 1991	Bamberg, Germany	Carpet	(Germany) Martina Pawlik	(Germany) Sabine Auer (Germany) Heike Thoms	6–4, 6–7, 6–3
