= Sabine Auer =

German tennis player

- Full name: Sabine Krein-Auer
- Country (sports): West Germany; Germany
- Born: 2 October 1966 (age 58); Radolfzell, West Germany
- Retired: 1993
- Prize money: $53,958

Singles
- Career record: 70-79
- Career titles: 2 ITF
- Highest ranking: No. 125 (21 November 1988)

Grand Slam singles results
- Australian Open: 1R (1989)
- French Open: 1R (1988)

Doubles
- Career record: 16-18
- Career titles: 1 ITF
- Highest ranking: No. 342 (8 May 1989)

Sabine Krein-Auer (born 2 October 1966) is a German former professional tennis player. She played under her maiden name Sabine Auer.

== Biography ==
Born in Radolfzell, Auer competed on the professional tour in the 1980 and 1990s, reaching a best singles ranking of 125 in the world.

Auer's best performance on the WTA Tour was making the fourth round of the 1988 Lipton International Players Championships. Playing in the main draw as a qualifier, she defeated Iwona Kuczyńska, Amy Frazier and world number seven Hana Mandlíková, before being eliminated by Barbara Potter. In her upset win over Mandlíková she saved five match points in the second set.

She featured in the women's singles main draws at the 1988 French Open and 1989 Australian Open.

Now living in Saarland, Auer still plays tennis competitively on the ITF senior's circuit. She was the ITF Over 40s World Champion in 2009.

== ITF finals ==
=== Singles (2–1) ===
Result	No.	Date	Tournament	Surface	Opponent	Score
Loss	1.	3 August 1987	Rheda, West Germany	Clay	(West Germany) Tanja Weigl	4–6, 2–6
Win	2.	10 August 1987	Darmstadt, West Germany	Clay	(West Germany) Martina Pawlik	7–5, 6–2
Win	3.	7 January 1991	Bamberg, Germany	Carpet	(Czechoslovakia) Petra Holubová	7–6, 4–6, 6–4

=== Doubles (1–2) ===
Result	No.	Date	Tournament	Surface	Partner	Opponents	Score
Win	1.	1 January 1990	Bamberg, West Germany	Carpet	(West Germany) Heike Thoms	(West Germany) Cora Hofmann (West Germany) Alexandra Seifarth	6–4, 6–2
Loss	2.	7 January 1991	Bamberg, Germany	Carpet	(Germany) Heike Thoms	(Germany) Steffi Menning (Germany) Martina Pawlik	4–6, 7–6, 3–6
Loss	3.	11 January 1993	Coburg, Germany	Carpet	(Germany) Heike Thoms	(Czech Republic) Ivana Havrlíková (Czech Republic) Pavlína Rajzlová	3–6, 0–6
