= Heike Thoms =

German tennis player

- Country (sports): West Germany; Germany
- Born: 1 November 1968 (age 56)
- Prize money: $77,905

Singles
- Highest ranking: No. 128 (1 August 1988)

Grand Slam singles results
- French Open: Q3 (1988)

Doubles
- Highest ranking: No. 301 (20 August 1990)

Heike Thoms (born 1 November 1968) is a German former professional tennis player.

Thoms started on tour in the late 1980s and reached a best singles ranking of 128 in the world. She made the second round of the 1988 German Open and also twice reached the second round in Hamburg.

== ITF finals ==
$25,000 tournaments
$10,000 tournaments

=== Singles: 12 (6–6) ===
Result	No.	Date	Tournament	Surface	Opponent	Score
Loss	1.	4 August 1986	Rheda-Wiedenbrück, West Germany	Clay	(West Germany) Cornelia Lechner	1–6, 6–3, 2–6
Loss	2.	6 October 1986	Mali Lošinj, Yugoslavia	Hard	(Czechoslovakia) Regina Rajchrtová	2–6, 3–6
Win	1.	11 July 1988	Erlangen, West Germany	Clay	(West Germany) Tanja Weigl	4–6, 6–4, 6–3
Win	2.	1 January 1990	Bamberg, West Germany	Carpet	(West Germany) Katja Oeljeklaus	7–5, 6–3
Loss	3.	6 August 1990	Paderborn, West Germany	Clay	(Greece) Julia Apostoli	1–6, 0–6
Win	3.	November 1991	Flensburg, Germany	Carpet	(Belgium) Nancy Feber	7–6^{(3)}, 6–4
Win	4.	11 January 1993	Coburg, Germany	Carpet	(Hungary) Gabriela Mach	4–6, 6–2, 7–5
Loss	4.	7 March 1994	Offenbach am Main, Germany	Carpet	(Russia) Julia Lutrova	3–6, 3–6
Win	5.	9 October 1995	Burgdorf, Switzerland	Carpet	(Czech Republic) Jana Macurova	6–1, 3–6, 6–2
Win	6.	27 November 1995	Salzburg, Austria	Carpet	(Austria) Patricia Wartusch	7–5, 7–6^{(1)}
Loss	5.	29 January 1996	Rungsted, Denmark	Carpet	(Denmark) Karin Ptaszek	0–6, 4–6
Loss	6.	7 October 1996	Burgdorf, Switzerland	Carpet	(Germany) Fruzsina Siklosi	1–6, 3–6

=== Doubles: 7 (2–5) ===
Result	No.	Date	Tournament	Surface	Partner	Opponents	Score
Loss	1.	6 April 1987	Caserta, Italy	Hard	(Greece) Olga Tsarbopoulou	(Soviet Union) Eugenia Maniokova (Soviet Union) Natalia Medvedeva	3–6, 5–7
Win	1.	1 January 1990	Bamberg, West Germany	Carpet	(West Germany) Sabine Auer	(West Germany) Cora Hofmann (West Germany) Alexandra Seifarth	6–4, 6–2
Loss	2.	5 February 1990	Stavanger, Norway	Capet	(West Germany) Barbara Rittner	(Soviet Union) Elena Brioukhovets (Sweden) Nina Erickson	2–6, 2–6
Win	2.	6 August 1990	Paderborn, West Germany	Clay	(West Germany) Tanja Hauschildt	(Greece) Julia Apostoli (Soviet Union) Anna Mirza	6–3, 6–1
Loss	3.	7 January 1991	Bamberg, Germany	Carpet	(Germany) Sabine Auer	(Germany) Steffi Menning (Germany) Martina Pawlik	4–6, 7–6, 3–6
Loss	4.	31 August 1992	Klagenfurt, Austria	Clay	(Germany) Katja Oeljeklaus	(Czechoslovakia) Denisa Krajčovičová (Czechoslovakia) Jana Pospíšilová	W/O
Loss	5.	11 January 1993	Coburg, Germany	Carpet	(Germany) Sabine Auer	(Czech Republic) Ivana Havrlíková (Czech Republic) Pavlína Rajzlová	3–6, 0–6
