= Katharina Düll =

German tennis player

- ITF name: Katharina Duell
- Country (sports): West Germany; Germany
- Born: 9 April 1973 (age 52)
- Prize money: $32,166

Singles
- Highest ranking: No. 225 (23 May 1988)

Grand Slam singles results
- French Open: Q2 (1988)

Doubles
- Highest ranking: No. 421 (12 August 1991)

Katharina Düll (born 9 April 1973) is a German former professional tennis player.

Düll was a member of West Germany's World Youth Cup (Junior Fed Cup) winning team in 1989. On the professional tour, she reached a career high singles ranking of 225 in the world. She made the second round of the 1987 Argentine Open in Buenos Aires and 1989 Citizen Cup in Hamburg.
