= Jana Novotná career statistics =

Career finals
Discipline	Type	Won	Lost	Total
Singles	Grand Slam	1	3	4
Singles	Summer Olympics	–	–	–
Singles	WTA Tour Championships	1	0	1
Singles	Tier I	2	0	2
Singles	Tier II	11	8	19
Singles	Tier III, IV & V	9	5	14
Singles	Virginia Slims	–	–	–
Singles	Total	24	16	40
Doubles	Grand Slam	12	11	–
Doubles	Summer Olympics	–	–	–
Doubles	WTA Tour Championships	2	5	–
Doubles	Tier I	15	8	–
Doubles	Tier II	28	18	–
Doubles	Tier III, IV & V	17	8	–
Doubles	Virginia Slims	2	0	1
Doubles	Total	76	50	126
Mixed	Grand Slam	4	1	5
Mixed	Total	4	1	5

This is a list of the main career statistics of former professional tennis player Jana Novotná.

== Career archievements ==
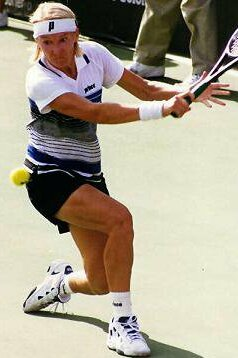
Novotná preparing for a backhand shot

Novotná achieved success in all three disciplines: singles, doubles, and mixed doubles. Her greatest achievement in singles was winning the Wimbledon Championships in 1998. In addition to her singles title, she won 12 Grand Slam titles in women's doubles and four in mixed doubles.

She also won the WTA Tour Championships (now known as the WTA Finals) three times: once in singles in 1997 and twice in doubles, in 1995 and 1997. At Tier I tournaments, she won two singles titles and 15 doubles titles.

Representing the Czech Republic, Novotná won a bronze medal in singles at the 1996 Summer Olympics. In 1988, representing Czechoslovakia, she was part of the team that won the Federation Cup. Novotná reached world No. 1 in doubles and achieved a career-high singles ranking of world No. 2.

== Performance timelines ==
Key
W	F	SF	QF	#R	RR	Q#	P#	DNQ	A	Z#	PO	G	S	B	NMS	NTI	P	NH

(W) winner; (F) finalist; (SF) semifinalist; (QF) quarterfinalist; (#R) rounds 4, 3, 2, 1; (RR) round-robin stage; (Q#) qualification round; (P#) preliminary round; (DNQ) did not qualify; (A) absent; (Z#) Davis/Fed Cup Zonal Group (with number indication) or (PO) play-off; (G) gold, (S) silver or (B) bronze Olympic/Paralympic medal; (NMS) not a Masters tournament; (NTI) not a Tier I tournament; (P) postponed; (NH) not held; (SR) strike rate (events won / competed); (W–L) win–loss record.
To avoid confusion and double counting, these charts are updated at the conclusion of a tournament or when the player's participation has ended.

=== Singles ===
	Czechoslovakia								Czech Republic									
Tournament	1985	1986	1987	1988	1989	1990	1991	1992	1993	1994	1995	1996	1997	1998	1999	SR	W–L	Win %
Grand Slam tournaments
Australian Open	A	NH	A	1R	3R	3R	F	4R	2R	QF	4R	A	A	A	3R	0 / 9	23–9	
French Open	A	1R	3R	1R	QF	SF	QF	4R	QF	1R	3R	SF	3R	QF	4R	0 / 14	38–14	
Wimbledon	A	1R	4R	2R	4R	QF	2R	3R	F	QF	SF	QF	F	W	QF	1 / 14	50–13	
US Open	A	Q2	4R	1R	2R	QF	4R	1R	4R	SF	QF	QF	QF	SF	3R	0 / 13	38–13	
Win–Loss	0–0	0–2	8–3	1–4	10–4	15–4	14–4	8–4	14–4	13–4	14–4	13–3	12–3	16–2	11–4	1 / 50	149–49	
Year-end championships
WTA Tour Championships	Did Not Qualify				1R	1R	SF	QF	QF	QF	1R	SF	W	1R	DNQ	1 / 10	11–9	
Grand Slam Cup	Not Held													QF	A	0 / 1	0–1	
National representation
Summer Olympics	Not Held			2R	Not Held			1R	Not Held			SF-B	Not Held			0 / 3	6–3	
Fed Cup	A	A	SF	W	SF	QF	SF	QF	QF	A	W2_{PO}	W1_{PO}	SF	QF	A	1 / 9	22–7	
Category 4-6 / Tier I tournaments
Miami Open	Not Tier I		1R	1R	QF	4R	A	A	QF	QF	SF	3R	SF	QF	QF	0 / 11	27–11	
German Open	Not Tier I		3R	1R	A	3R	SF	3R	A	SF	A	A	SF	SF	2R	0 / 9	16–9	
Canadian Open	Not Tier I		A	A	QF	A	A	A	3R	A	SF	A	A	SF	2R	0 / 5	9–5	
Charleston Open	Not Tier I		A	2R	A	A	QF	3R	A	A	A	SF	3R	3R	SF	0 / 7	12–7	
Italian Open	NTI	NH	Not Tier I		A	A	A	A	3R	A	A	A	A	2R	A	0 / 2	0–2	
Pan Pacific Open	Not Tier I		A	A	A	Not Tier I			SF	2R	A	A	A	A	SF	0 / 3	6–3	
Zürich Open	Not Tier I				F	Not Tier I			1R	A	QF	W	SF	A	A	1 / 5	11–4	
Indian Wells Open	Not Held				QF	Not Tier I						A	A	A	QF	0 / 2	4–2	
Kremlin Cup	Not Held											NTI	W	A	A	1 / 1	4–0	
Philadelphia Championships	Not Held						Not Tier I		A	A	A	Not Tier I				0 / 0	0–0	
Florida Slims	Not Tier I		A	A	SF	NTI	A	A	Not Tier I			Not Held				0 / 1	4–1	
Ameritech Cup	Not Tier I			A	1R	A	Not Tier I							Not Held		0 / 1	0–1	
Silicon Valley Classic (Note: Before Tiers existed, there were ‘Category’ tournaments, which no longer existed after the introduction of the Tier system. This note covers the tournaments that did not obtain Tier I status.)	Not Tier I			2R	A	Not Tier I										0 / 1	1–1	
Amelia Island Championships	Not Tier I		1R	2R	A	Not Tier I										0 / 2	1–2	
Stuttgart Open	Not Tier I			2R	A	Not Tier I										0 / 1	1–1	
LA Championships	Not Tier I		3R	A	A	Not Tier I										0 / 1	2–1	
Brighton International	Not Tier I		A	A	SF	Not Tier I						Not Held				0 / 1	3–1	
Win–Loss	0–0	0–0	5–4	4–6	19–7	3–2	5–2	2–2	7–5	7–3	8–3	8–2	14–4	10–5	10–6	2 / 53	102–51	
Career statistics
Year-end ranking	306	171	47	35	11	13	7	10	6	4	11	5	2	3	NR	$11,249,284		

=== Doubles ===
Tournament	1986	1987	1988	1989	1990	1991	1992	1993	1994	1995	1996	1997	1998	1999	SR	W–L
Grand Slam tournaments
Australian Open	NH	A	QF	SF	W	F	QF	QF	SF	W	A	A	A	3R	2 / 9	36–7
French Open	2R	3R	A	SF	W	W	SF	F	A	F	SF	3R	W	QF	3 / 12	48–9
Wimbledon	Q1	2R	3R	W	W	F	F	F	F	W	QF	QF (Note: Withdrew during the tournament. Not counted as a loss.)	W	SF	4 / 13	56–8
US Open	A	3R	3R	3R	F	F	F	2R	W	QF	F	W	W	3R	3 / 13	49–10
Win–Loss	1–1	5–3	7–3	16–3	23–1	21–3	17–4	14–4	15–2	19–2	12–3	11–1	18–0	10–4	12 / 47	189–34
Year-end championship
WTA Tour Championships	A	QF	A	SF	QF	F	F	F	F	W	F	W	QF	A	2 / 11	17–9
National representation
Summer Olympics	Not Held		S	Not Held			QF	Not Held			S	Not Held			0 / 3	9–3
Category 4-6 / Tier I tournaments
Miami Open	NTI	2R	1R	W	W	F	A	W	SF	W	W	3R	W	W	7 / 12	44–5
German Open	NTI	2R	QF	A	F	SF	W	A	F	SF	A	W	QF	F	2 / 10	25–7
Canadian Open	NTI	SF	W	QF	A	A	A	W	A	SF	A	A	W	W	4 / 7	22–3
Charleston Open	NTI	1R	A	A	A	QF	F	A	A	A	W	F	SF	W	2 / 7	17–5
Italian Open	NH	Not Tier I		A	A	A	A	W	A	A	A	A	A	A	1 / 1	4–0
Pan Pacific Open	NTI	A	A	A	Not Tier I			SF	A	A	A	A	A	F	0 / 2	5–2
Zürich Open	Not Tier I			W	Not Tier I			SF	A	QF	A	SF	A	A	1 / 4	8–3
Indian Wells Open	Not Held			A	Not Tier I						A	A	A	F	0 / 1	4–1
Kremlin Cup	Not Held										NTI	A	A	A	0 / 0	0–0
Philadelphia Championships	Not Held					Not Tier I		A	A	A	Not Tier I				0 / 0	0–0
Florida Slims	NTI	A	2R	W	NTI	A	A	Not Tier I			Not Held				1 / 2	4–1
Ameritech Cup	Not Tier I		A	F	A	Not Tier I							Not Held		0 / 1	2–1
Silicon Valley Classic	Not Tier I		F	A	Not Tier I										0 / 1	3–1
Amelia Island Championships	NTI	SF	2R	A	Not Tier I										0 / 2	3–2
Eastbourne International	NTI	1R	A	F	Not Tier I										0 / 2	4–2
LA Championships	NTI	SF	A	A	Not Tier I										0 / 1	3–1
Brighton International	NTI	SF	A	F	Not Tier I						Not Held				0 / 2	5–2
New England Slims	NTI	1R	A	A	NTI	Not Held									0 / 1	0–1
Win–Loss	0–0	13–9	8–5	23–4	8–1	7–3	7–1	17–2	6–2	10–3	9–0	10–3	13–1	22–3	18 / 56	153–37
Career statistics
Year-end ranking	137	24	13	5	2	1	4	4	4	2	3	6	3	NR		

=== Mixed doubles ===
	Czechoslovakia					Czech Republic		
Tournament	1988	1989	1990	1991	1992	1993	1994	W–L
Grand Slam tournaments
Australian Open	W	W	A	A	A	A	A	10–0
French Open	A	A	A	A	2R	A	A	0–1
Wimbledon	2R	W	SF	A	QF	A	A	11–2
US Open	W	2R	A	A	A	A	F	10–2

== Grand Slam tournament finals ==
=== Singles: 4 (1 title, 3 runner-ups) ===
Result	Year	Tournament	Surface	Opponent	Score
Loss	1991	Australian Open	Hard	(Socialist Federal Republic of Yugoslavia) Monica Seles	7–5, 3–6, 1–6
Loss	1993	Wimbledon	Grass	(Germany) Steffi Graf	6–7^{(6–8)}, 6–1, 4–6
Loss	1997	Wimbledon	Grass	(Switzerland) Martina Hingis	6–2, 3–6, 3–6
Win	1998	Wimbledon	Grass	(France) Nathalie Tauziat	6–4, 7–6^{(7–2)}

=== Doubles: 23 (12 titles, 11 runner-ups) ===
Result	Year	Tournament	Surface	Partner	Opponents	Score
Win	1989	Wimbledon	Grass	(Czechoslovakia) Helena Suková	(Soviet Union) Larisa Neiland (Soviet Union) Natasha Zvereva	6–1, 6–2
Win	1990	Australian Open	Hard	(Czechoslovakia) Helena Suková	(United States) Patty Fendick (United States) Mary Joe Fernandez	7–6^{(7–5)}, 7–6^{(8–6)}
Win	1990	French Open	Clay	(Czechoslovakia) Helena Suková	(Soviet Union) Larisa Neiland (Soviet Union) Natasha Zvereva	6–4, 7–5
Win	1990	Wimbledon	Grass	(Czechoslovakia) Helena Suková	(United States) Kathy Jordan (Australia) Elizabeth Smylie	6–3, 6–4
Loss	1990	US Open	Hard	(Czechoslovakia) Helena Suková	(United States) Gigi Fernández (United States) Martina Navratilova	2–6, 4–6
Loss	1991	Australian Open	Hard	(United States) Gigi Fernández	(United States) Patty Fendick (United States) Mary Joe Fernandez	6–7^{(4–7)}, 1–6
Win	1991	French Open	Clay	(United States) Gigi Fernández	(Soviet Union) Larisa Neiland (Soviet Union) Natasha Zvereva	6–4, 6–0
Loss	1991	Wimbledon	Grass	(Puerto Rico) Gigi Fernández	(Soviet Union) Larisa Neiland (Soviet Union) Natasha Zvereva	4–6, 6–3, 4–6
Loss	1991	US Open	Hard	(Latvia) Larisa Neiland	(United States) Pam Shriver (Belarus) Natasha Zvereva	4–6, 6–4, 6–7^{(5–7)}
Loss	1992	Wimbledon	Grass	(Latvia) Larisa Neiland	(United States) Gigi Fernández (Belarus) Natasha Zvereva	4–6, 1–6
Loss	1992	US Open	Hard	(Latvia) Larisa Neiland	(United States) Gigi Fernández (Belarus) Natasha Zvereva	6–7^{(4–7)}, 1–6
Loss	1993	French Open	Clay	(Latvia) Larisa Neiland	(United States) Gigi Fernández (Belarus) Natasha Zvereva	3–6, 5–7
Loss	1993	Wimbledon	Grass	(Latvia) Larisa Neiland	(United States) Gigi Fernández (Belarus) Natasha Zvereva	4–6, 7–6^{(9–7)}, 4–6
Loss	1994	Wimbledon	Grass	(Spain) Arantxa Sánchez Vicario	(United States) Gigi Fernández (Belarus) Natasha Zvereva	4–6, 1–6
Win	1994	US Open	Hard	(Spain) Arantxa Sánchez Vicario	(Bulgaria) Katerina Maleeva (United States) Robin White	6–3, 6–3
Win	1995	Australian Open	Hard	(Spain) Arantxa Sánchez Vicario	(United States) Gigi Fernández (Belarus) Natasha Zvereva	6–3, 6–7^{(3–7)}, 6–4
Loss	1995	French Open	Clay	(Spain) Arantxa Sánchez Vicario	(United States) Gigi Fernández (Belarus) Natasha Zvereva	7–6^{(8–6)}, 4–6, 5–7
Win	1995	Wimbledon	Grass	(Spain) Arantxa Sánchez Vicario	(United States) Gigi Fernández (Belarus) Natasha Zvereva	5–7, 7–5, 6–4
Loss	1996	US Open	Hard	(Spain) Arantxa Sánchez Vicario	(United States) Gigi Fernández (Belarus) Natasha Zvereva	6–1, 1–6, 4–6
Win	1997	US Open	Hard	(United States) Lindsay Davenport	(United States) Gigi Fernández (Belarus) Natasha Zvereva	6–3, 6–4
Win	1998	French Open	Clay	(Switzerland) Martina Hingis	(United States) Lindsay Davenport (Belarus) Natasha Zvereva	6–1, 7–6^{(7–4)}
Win	1998	Wimbledon	Grass	(Switzerland) Martina Hingis	(United States) Lindsay Davenport (Belarus) Natasha Zvereva	6–3, 3–6, 8–6
Win	1998	US Open	Hard	(Switzerland) Martina Hingis	(United States) Lindsay Davenport (Belarus) Natasha Zvereva	6–3, 6–3

=== Mixed doubles: 5 (4 titles, 1 runner-up) ===
Result	Year	Tournament	Surface	Partner	Opponents	Score
Win	1988	Australian Open	Hard	(United States) Jim Pugh	(United States) Martina Navratilova (United States) Tim Gullikson	5–7, 6–2, 6–4
Win	1988	US Open	Hard	(United States) Jim Pugh	(Australia) Elizabeth Smylie (United States) Patrick McEnroe	7–5, 6–3
Win	1989	Australian Open	Hard	(United States) Jim Pugh	(United States) Zina Garrison (United States) Sherwood Stewart	6–3, 6–4
Win	1989	Wimbledon	Grass	(United States) Jim Pugh	(Australia) Jenny Byrne (United States) Mark Kratzmann	4–6, 7–5, 6–4
Loss	1994	US Open	Hard	(Australia) Todd Woodbridge	(South Africa) Elna Reinach (United States) Patrick Galbraith	2–6, 4–6

== Other significant finals ==
=== Year-end championships ===
==== Singles: 1 (title) ====
Result	Year	Tournament	Surface	Opponent	Score
Win	1997	New York	Carpet (i)	(France) Mary Pierce	7–6^{(7–4)}, 6–2, 6–3

==== Doubles: 7 (2 titles, 5 runner-ups) ====
Result	Year	Tournament	Surface	Partner	Opponents	Score
Loss	1991	New York	Carpet (i)	(United States) Gigi Fernández	(United States) Martina Navratilova (United States) Pam Shriver	6–4, 5–7, 4–6
Loss	1992	New York	Carpet (i)	(Latvia) Larisa Neiland	(Spain) Arantxa Sánchez Vicario (Czech Republic) Helena Suková	6–7^{(4–7)}, 1–6
Loss	1993	New York	Carpet (i)	(Latvia) Larisa Neiland	(United States) Gigi Fernández (Belarus) Natasha Zvereva	3–6, 5–7
Loss	1994	New York	Carpet (i)	(Spain) Arantxa Sánchez Vicario	(United States) Gigi Fernández (Belarus) Natasha Zvereva	3–6, 7–6^{(7–4)}, 3–6
Win	1995	New York	Carpet (i)	(Spain) Arantxa Sánchez Vicario	(United States) Gigi Fernández (Belarus) Natasha Zvereva	6–2, 6–1
Loss	1996	New York	Carpet (i)	(Spain) Arantxa Sánchez Vicario	(United States) Lindsay Davenport (United States) Mary Joe Fernández	3–6, 2–6
Win	1997	New York	Carpet (i)	(United States) Lindsay Davenport	(France) Alexandra Fusai (France) Nathalie Tauziat	6–7^{(5–7)}, 6–3, 6–2

=== Summer Olympics ===
==== Singles: 1 (bronze medal) ====
Result	Year	Tournament	Surface	Opponent	Score
Bronze	1996	Atlanta	Hard	(United States) Mary Joe Fernandez	7–6^{(8–6)}, 6–4

==== Doubles: 2 (2 silver medals) ====
Result	Year	Tournament	Surface	Partner	Opponents	Score
Silver	1988	Seoul	Hard	(Czechoslovakia) Helena Suková	(United States) Zina Garrison (United States) Pam Shriver	4–6, 6–2, 10–8
Silver	1996	Atlanta	Hard	(Czech Republic) Helena Suková	(United States) Gigi Fernández (United States) Mary Joe Fernandez	7–6^{(8–6)}, 6–4

== WTA Tour finals ==
=== Singles: 40 (24 titles, 16 runner-ups) ===
Legend Grand Slam (1–3) WTA Tour Championships(1–0) Tier I (2–1) Tier II (11–9) Tier III & IV (9–3) Category 2, 3 & 4 ()	Finals by surface Hard (5–2) Grass (2–3) Clay (4–2) Carpet (13–9)

Result	W–L	Date	Tournament	Tier	Surface	Opponent	Score
Loss	0–1	Dec 1987	Brisbane, Australia	Category 2	Grass	(United States) Pam Shriver	6–7^{(6–8)}, 6–7^{(4–7)}
Win	1–1	Nov 1988	Adelaide, Australia	Category 2	Hard	(Czechoslovakia) Jana Pospíšilová	7–5, 6–4
Loss	1–2	May 1989	Hamburg, West Germany	Category 3	Clay	(West Germany) Steffi Graf	w/o
Win	2–2	May 1989	Strasbourg, France	Category 2	Clay	(Argentina) Patricia Tarabini	6–1, 6–2
Loss	2–3	Oct 1989	Zurich, Switzerland	Category 4	Carpet (i)	(West Germany) Steffi Graf	1–6, 6–7^{(6–8)}
Win	3–3	Aug 1990	Albuquerque, US	Tier IV	Hard	(Peru) Laura Gildemeister	6–4, 6–4
Win	4–3	Jan 1991	Sydney, Australia	Tier III	Hard	(Spain) Arantxa Sánchez Vicario	6–4, 6–2
Loss	4–4	Jan 1991	Australian Open	Grand Slam	Hard	(Socialist Federal Republic of Yugoslavia) Monica Seles	7–5, 3–6, 1–6
Win	5–4	Feb 1991	Oklahoma City, US	Tier IV	Hard (i)	(United States) Anne Smith	3–6, 6–3, 6–2
Loss	5–5	Sep 1991	Leipzig, Germany	Tier III	Carpet (i)	(Germany) Steffi Graf	3–6, 3–6
Loss	5–6	Feb 1992	Chicago, US	Tier II	Carpet (i)	(United States) Martina Navratilova	6–7^{(4–7)}, 6–4, 5–7
Loss	5–7	Sep 1992	Leipzig, Germany	Tier III	Carpet (i)	(Germany) Steffi Graf	3–6, 6–1, 4–6
Loss	5–8	Oct 1992	Brighton, UK	Tier II	Carpet (i)	(Germany) Steffi Graf	6–4, 4–6, 6–7^{(3–7)}
Win	6–8	Feb 1993	Osaka, Japan	Tier III	Carpet (i)	(Japan) Kimiko Date	6–3, 6–2
Loss	6–9	Jun 1993	Wimbledon	Grand Slam	Grass	(Germany) Steffi Graf	6–7^{(6–8)}, 6–1, 4–6
Loss	6–10	Sep 1993	Leipzig, Germany	Tier II	Carpet (i)	(Germany) Steffi Graf	2–6, 0–6
Win	7–10	Oct 1993	Brighton, UK	Tier II	Carpet (i)	(Germany) Anke Huber	6–2, 6–4
Win	8–10	Sep 1994	Leipzig, Germany	Tier II	Carpet (i)	(France) Mary Pierce	7–5, 6–1
Win	9–10	Oct 1994	Brighton, UK	Tier II	Carpet (i)	(Czech Republic) Helena Suková	6–7^{(4–7)}, 6–3, 6–4
Win	10–10	Oct 1994	Essen, Germany	Tier II	Carpet (i)	(Croatia) Iva Majoli	6–2, 6–4
Win	11–10	Feb 1995	Linz, Austria	Tier III	Carpet (i)	(Germany) Barbara Rittner	6–7^{(6–8)}, 6–3, 6–4
Loss	11–11	Feb 1996	Essen, Germany	Tier II	Carpet (i)	(Croatia) Iva Majoli	5–7, 6–1, 6–7^{(6–8)}
Win	12–11	May 1996	Madrid, Spain	Tier II	Clay	(Bulgaria) Magdalena Maleeva	4–6, 6–4, 6–3
Win	13–11	Oct 1996	Zurich, Switzerland	Tier I	Carpet (i)	(Switzerland) Martina Hingis	6–2, 6–2
Win	14–11	Oct 1996	Chicago, US	Tier II	Carpet (i)	(United States) Jennifer Capriati	6–4, 3–6, 6–1
Win	15–11	Nov 1996	Philadelphia, US	Tier II	Carpet (i)	(Germany) Steffi Graf	6–4, ret.
Loss	15–12	Feb 1997	Hanover, Germany	Tier II	Carpet (i)	(Croatia) Iva Majoli	6–4, 6–7^{(2–7)}, 4–6
Win	16–12	May 1997	Madrid, Spain	Tier III	Clay	(United States) Monica Seles	7–5, 6–1
Loss	16–13	Jun 1997	Wimbledon	Grand Slam	Grass	(Switzerland) Martina Hingis	6–2, 3–6, 3–6
Win	17–13	Sep 1997	Leipzig, Germany	Tier II	Carpet (i)	(South Africa) Amanda Coetzer	6–2, 4–6, 6–3
Win	18–13	Oct 1997	Moscow, Russia	Tier I	Carpet (i)	(Japan) Ai Sugiyama	6–3, 6–4
Win	19–13	Nov 1997	WTA Tour Championships	Championships	Carpet (i)	(France) Mary Pierce	7–6^{(4–7)}, 6–2, 6–3
Loss	19–14	Feb 1998	Hanover, Germany	Tier II	Carpet (i)	(Switzerland) Patty Schnyder	0–6, 6–3, 5–7
Win	20–14	Feb 1998	Linz, Austria	Tier II	Hard (i)	(Belgium) Dominique Van Roost	6–1, 7–6^{(7–2)}
Loss	20–15	Apr 1998	Hamburg, Germany	Tier II	Clay	(Switzerland) Martina Hingis	3–6, 5–7
Win	21–15	Jun 1998	Eastbourne, UK	Tier II	Grass	(Spain) Arantxa Sánchez Vicario	6–1, 7–5
Win	22–15	Jun 1998	Wimbledon	Grand Slam	Grass	(France) Nathalie Tauziat	6–4, 7–6^{(7–2)}
Win	23–15	Jul 1998	Prague, Czech Republic	Tier III	Clay	(France) Sandrine Testud	6–3, 6–0
Loss	23–16	Aug 1998	New Haven, US	Tier II	Hard	(Germany) Steffi Graf	4–6, 1–6
Win	24–16	Feb 1999	Hanover, Germany	Tier II	Carpet (i)	(United States) Venus Williams	6–4, 6–4

=== Doubles: 126 (76 titles, 50 runner-ups) ===
Legend
Grand Slam (12–11)
WTA Tour Championships (2–5)
Tier I (18–12)
Tier II (30–19)
Tier III & IV (12–3)
Category 1+, 2, 3, 4 & 5 ()
Virginia Slims (2–0)

Result	W–L	Date	Tournament	Tier	Surface	Partner	Opponents	Score
Win	1–0	May 1987	Strasbourg, France	Category 1+	Clay	(France) Catherine Suire	(United States) Kathleen Horvath (Netherlands) Marcella Mesker	6–0, 6–2
Win	2–0	Aug 1987	San Diego, US	Category 1+	Hard	(France) Catherine Suire	(United States) Elise Burgin (United States) Sharon Walsh	6–3, 6–4
Win	3–0	Sep 1987	Hamburg, West Germany	Category 3	Clay	(Germany) Claudia Kohde-Kilsch	(Soviet Union) Natalia Egorova (Soviet Union) Leila Meskhi	7–6^{(7–1)}, 7–6^{(8–6)}
Loss	3–1	Oct 1987	Zurich. Switzerland	Category 3	Carpet (i)	(France) Catherine Suire	(France) Nathalie Herreman (France) Pascale Paradis	3–6, 6–2, 3–6
Loss	3–2	Feb 1988	Oakland, US	Category 4	Carpet (i)	(Czech Republic) Hana Mandlíková	(United States) Rosemary Casals (United States) Martina Navratilova	4–6, 4–6
Win	4–2	Feb 1988	Oklahoma City, US	Category 2	Carpet (i)	(France) Catherine Suire	(Sweden) Catarina Lindqvist (Denmark) Tine Scheuer-Larsen	6–4, 6–4
Loss	4–3	Feb 1988	Kansas, US	Category 2	Hard (i)	(France) Catherine Suire	(Soviet Union) Natalia Egorova (Soviet Union) Svetlana Parkhomenko	3–6, 4–6
Win	5–3	May 1988	Rome, Italy	Category 3	Clay	(France) Catherine Suire	(Australia) Jenny Byrne (Australia) Janine Thompson	6–3, 4–6, 7–5
Win	6–3	Jul 1988	Hamburg, West Germany	Category 2	Clay	(Denmark) Tine Scheuer-Larsen	(Germany) Andrea Betzner (Austria) Judith Wiesner	6–4, 6–2
Win	7–3	Aug 1988	Montreal, Canada	Category 5	Hard	(Czech Republic) Helena Suková	(United States) Zina Garrison (United States) Pam Shriver	7–6^{(7–2)}, 7–6^{(8–6)}
Win	8–3	Aug 1988	Mahwah, US	Category 3	Hard	(Czech Republic) Helena Suková	(United States) Gigi Fernández (United States) Robin White	6–3, 6–2
Loss	8–4	Nov 1988	Adelaide, Australia	Category 2	Hard	(United States) Lori McNeil	(Germany) Sylvia Hanika (Germany) Claudia Kohde-Kilsch	5–7, 7–6^{(7–4)}, 4–6
Win	9–4	Jan 1989	Brisbane, Australia	Category 2	Hard	(Czech Republic) Helena Suková	(United States) Patty Fendick (Canada) Jill Hetherington	6–7^{(4–7)}, 6–1, 6–2
Win	10.	Mar 1989	Boca Raton, US	Category 5	Hard	(Czech Republic) Helena Suková	(United Kingdom) Jo Durie (United States) Mary Joe Fernández	6–4, 6–2
Win	11.	Mar 1989	Key Biscayne, US	Category 5	Hard	(Czech Republic) Helena Suková	(United States) Gigi Fernández (United States) Lori McNeil	7–6^{(7–5)}, 6–4
Win	12.	Apr 1989	Barcelona, Spain	Category 2	Clay	(Denmark) Tine Scheuer-Larsen	(Spain) Arantxa Sánchez Vicario (Austria) Judith Wiesner	6–2, 2–6, 7–6^{(7–3)}
Loss	5.	May 1989	Hamburg, West Germany	Category 3	Clay	(Czech Republic) Helena Suková	(France) Isabelle Demongeot (France) Nathalie Tauziat	w/o
Loss	6.	Jun 1989	Eastbourne, UK	Category 5	Grass	(Czech Republic) Helena Suková	(United States) Katrina Adams (United States) Zina Garrison	3–6, ret.
Win	13.	Jun 1989	Wimbledon	Grand Slam	Grass	(Czech Republic) Helena Suková	(Soviet Union) Larisa Savchenko (Soviet Union) Natasha Zvereva	6–1, 6–2
Win	14.	Oct 1989	Zurich, Switzerland	Category 4	Carpet (i)	(Czech Republic) Helena Suková	(France) Nathalie Tauziat (Austria) Judith Wiesner	6–3, 3–6, 6–4
Loss	7.	Oct 1989	Brighton, UK	Category 4	Carpet (i)	(Australia) Hana Mandlíková	(United States) Katrina Adams (United States) Lori McNeil	6–4, 6–7^{(7–9)}, 4–6
Loss	8.	Nov 1989	Chicago, US	Category 4	Carpet (i)	(Czech Republic) Helena Suková	(Soviet Union) Larisa Savchenko (Soviet Union) Natasha Zvereva	3–6, 6–2, 3–6
Win	15.	Jan 1990	Brisbane, Australia	Tier IV	Hard	(Czech Republic) Helena Suková	(Australia) Hana Mandlíková (United States) Pam Shriver	6–3, 6–1
Win	16.	Jan 1990	Sydney, Australia	Tier III	Hard	(Czech Republic) Helena Suková	(Soviet Union) Larisa Neiland (Soviet Union) Natasha Zvereva	6–3, 7–5
Win	17.	Jan 1990	Australian Open	Grand Slam	Hard	(Czech Republic) Helena Suková	(United States) Patty Fendick (United States) Mary Joe Fernández	7–6^{(7–5)}, 7–6^{(8–6)}
Win	18.	Feb 1990	Indian Wells, US	Tier II	Hard	(Czech Republic) Helena Suková	(United States) Gigi Fernández (United States) Martina Navratilova	6–2, 7–6^{(8–6)}
Win	19.	Mar 1990	Boca Raton, US	Tier II	Hard	(Czech Republic) Helena Suková	(United States) Elise Burgin (Australia) Wendy Turnbull	6–4, 6–2
Win	20.	Mar 1990	Key Biscayne, US	Tier I	Hard	(Czech Republic) Helena Suková	(United States) Betsy Nagelsen (United States) Robin White	6–4, 6–3
Loss	9.	May 1990	Berlin, Germany	Tier I	Clay	(Australia) Hana Mandlíková	(Australia) Nicole Bradtke (South Africa) Elna Reinach	2–6, 1–6
Win	21.	May 1990	French Open	Grand Slam	Clay	(Czech Republic) Helena Suková	(Soviet Union) Larisa Neiland (Soviet Union) Natasha Zvereva	6–4, 7–5
Win	22.	Jun 1990	Wimbledon	Grand Slam	Grass	(Czech Republic) Helena Suková	(United States) Kathy Jordan (Australia) Elizabeth Smylie	6–3, 6–4
Win	23.	Aug 1990	Manhattan Beach, US	Tier II	Hard	(United States) Gigi Fernández	(Argentina) Mercedes Paz (Argentina) Gabriela Sabatini	6–3, 4–6, 6–4
Loss	10.	Aug 1990	US Open	Grand Slam	Hard	(Czech Republic) Helena Suková	(United States) Gigi Fernández (United States) Martina Navratilova	2–6, 4–6
Loss	11.	Nov 1990	Worcester, UK	Tier II	Carpet (i)	(United States) Mary Joe Fernández	(United States) Gigi Fernández (Czech Republic) Helena Suková	6–3, 3–6, 3–6
Win	24.	Dec 1990	Brisbane, Australia	Tier IV	Hard	(United States) Gigi Fernández	(United States) Patty Fendick (Czech Republic) Helena Suková	6–3, 6–1
Loss	12.	Jan 1991	Sydney, Australia	Tier III	Hard	(United States) Gigi Fernández	(Spain) Arantxa Sánchez Vicario (Czech Republic) Helena Suková	1–6, 4–6
Loss	13.	Jan 1991	Australian Open	Grand Slam	Hard	(United States) Gigi Fernández	(United States) Patty Fendick (United States) Mary Joe Fernández	6–7^{(4–7)}, 1–6
Win	25.	Feb 1991	Chicago, US	Tier II	Carpet (i)	(United States) Gigi Fernández	(United States) Martina Navratilova (United States) Pam Shriver	6–2, 6–4
Loss	14.	Mar 1991	Key Biscayne, US	Tier I	Hard	(United States) Gigi Fernández	(United States) Mary Joe Fernández (United States) Zina Garrison	5–7, 2–6
Win	26.	Apr 1991	Hamburg, Germany	Tier II	Clay	(Soviet Union) Larisa Neiland	(Spain) Arantxa Sánchez Vicario (Czech Republic) Helena Suková	7–5, 6–1
Win	27.	May 1991	French Open	Grand Slam	Clay	(United States) Gigi Fernández	(Soviet Union) Larisa Neiland (Soviet Union) Natasha Zvereva	6–4, 6–0
Loss	15.	Jun 1991	Eastbourne, UK	Tier II	Grass	(United States) Gigi Fernández	(Soviet Union) Larisa Neiland (Soviet Union) Natasha Zvereva	6–2, 4–6, 4–6
Loss	16.	Jun 1991	Wimbledon	Grand Slam	Grass	(United States) Gigi Fernández	(Soviet Union) Larisa Neiland (Soviet Union) Natasha Zvereva	4–6, 6–3, 4–6
Win	28.	Aug 1991	Washington, D.C., US	Tier II	Hard	(Soviet Union) Larisa Neiland	(United States) Gigi Fernández (Soviet Union) Natasha Zvereva	5–7, 6–1, 7–6^{(12–10)}
Loss	17.	Aug 1991	US Open	Grand Slam	Hard	(Soviet Union) Larisa Neiland	(United States) Pam Shriver (Belarus) Natasha Zvereva	4–6, 6–4, 6–7^{(5–7)}
Win	29.	Oct 1991	Zurich, Switzerland	Tier II	Carpet (i)	(Czech Republic) Andrea Strnadová	(United States) Zina Garrison (United States) Lori McNeil	6–4, 6–3
Win	30.	Oct 1991	Filderstadt, Germany	Tier II	Carpet (i)	(United States) Martina Navratilova	(United States) Pam Shriver (Belarus) Natasha Zvereva	6–2, 5–7, 6–4
Win	31.	Nov 1991	Philadelphia, US	Tier II	Carpet	(Latvia) Larisa Neiland	(United States) Mary Joe Fernández (United States) Zina Garrison	6–2, 6–4
Loss	18.	Nov 1991	New York, US	Finals	Carpet (i)	(United States) Gigi Fernández	(United States) Martina Navratilova (United States) Pam Shriver	6–4, 5–7, 4–6
Win	32.	Dec 1991	Brisbane, Australia	Tier IV	Hard	(Latvia) Larisa Neiland	(Netherlands) Manon Bollegraf (Australia) Nicole Bradtke	6–4, 6–3
Win	33.	Mar 1992	Tampa, US	Virginia Slims	Clay	(Latvia) Larisa Neiland	(Spain) Arantxa Sánchez Vicario (Belarus) Natasha Zvereva	6–4, 6–2
Loss	19.	Mar 1992	Hilton Head, US	Tier I	Clay	(Latvia) Larisa Neiland	(Spain) Arantxa Sánchez Vicario (Belarus) Natasha Zvereva	4–6, 2–6
Loss	20.	Apr 1992	Amelia Island, US	Tier II	Clay	(United States) Zina Garrison	(Spain) Arantxa Sánchez Vicario (Belarus) Natasha Zvereva	1–6, 0–6
Win	34.	May 1992	Berlin, Germany	Tier I	Clay	(Latvia) Larisa Neiland	(United States) Gigi Fernández (Belarus) Natasha Zvereva	7–6^{(7–5)}, 4–6, 7–5
Win	35.	Jun 1992	Eastbourne, UK	Tier II	Grass	(Latvia) Larisa Neiland	(United States) Mary Joe Fernández (United States) Zina Garrison	6–0, 6–3
Loss	21.	Jun 1992	Wimbledon	Grand Slam	Grass	(Latvia) Larisa Neiland	(United States) Gigi Fernández (Belarus) Natasha Zvereva	4–6, 1–6
Win	36.	Aug 1992	San Diego, US	Tier III	Hard	(Latvia) Larisa Neiland	(Spain) Conchita Martínez (Argentina) Mercedes Paz	6–1, 6–4
Loss	22.	Aug 1992	US Open	Grand Slam	Hard	(Latvia) Larisa Neiland	(United States) Gigi Fernández (Belarus) Natasha Zvereva	6–7^{(4–7)}, 1–6
Win	37.	Sep 1992	Leipzig, Germany	Tier III	Carpet (i)	(Latvia) Larisa Neiland	(United States) Patty Fendick (Czech Republic) Andrea Strnadová	7–5, 7–6^{(7–4)}
Win	38.	Oct 1992	Brighton, UK	Tier II	Carpet (i)	(Latvia) Larisa Neiland	(Spain) Conchita Martínez (Czech Republic) Radka Zrubáková	6–4, 6–1
Loss	23.	Nov 1992	New York, US		Carpet (i)	(Czech Republic) Jana Novotná	(Spain) Arantxa Sánchez Vicario (Czech Republic) Helena Suková	6–7^{(4–7)}, 1–6
Win	39.	Feb 1993	Osaka, Japan	Tier III	Carpet (i)	(Latvia) Larisa Neiland	(Bulgaria) Magdalena Maleeva (Switzerland) Manuela Maleeva-Fragniere	6–1, 6–3
Win	40.	Feb 1993	Paris, France	Tier II	Carpet (i)	(Czech Republic) Andrea Strnadová	(United Kingdom) Jo Durie (France) Catherine Suire	7–6^{(7–2)}, 6–2
Loss	24.	Mar 1993	Delray Beach, US	Tier II	Hard	(Latvia) Larisa Neiland	(United States) Gigi Fernández (Belarus) Natasha Zvereva	2–6, 2–6
Win	41.	Mar 1993	Key Biscayne, US	Tier I	Hard	(Latvia) Larisa Neiland	(Canada) Jill Hetherington (United States) Kathy Rinaldi	6–2, 7–5
Loss	25.	Apr 1993	Hamburg, Germany	Tier II	Clay	(Latvia) Larisa Neiland	(Germany) Steffi Graf (Australia) Rennae Stubbs	4–6, 6–7^{(5–7)}
Win	42.	May 1993	Rome, Italy	Tier I	Clay	(Spain) Arantxa Sánchez Vicario	(United States) Mary Joe Fernández (United States) Zina Garrison	6–4, 6–2
Loss	26.	May 1993	French Open	Grand Slam	Clay	(Latvia) Larisa Neiland	(United States) Gigi Fernández (Belarus) Natasha Zvereva	3–6, 5–7
Loss	27.	Jun 1993	Eastbourne, UK	Tier II	Grass	(Latvia) Larisa Neiland	(United States) Gigi Fernández (Belarus) Natasha Zvereva	6–2, 5–7, 1–6
Loss	28.	Jun 1993	Wimbledon	Grand Slam	Grass	(Latvia) Larisa Neiland	(United States) Gigi Fernández (Belarus) Natasha Zvereva	4–6, 7–6^{(11–9)}, 4–6
Win	43.	Aug 1993	Toronto, Canada	Tier I	Hard	(Latvia) Larisa Neiland	(Spain) Arantxa Sánchez Vicario (Czech Republic) Helena Suková	6–1, 6–2
Loss	29.	Sep 1993	Leipzig, Germany	Tier II	Carpet (i)	(Latvia) Larisa Neiland	(United States) Gigi Fernández (Belarus) Natasha Zvereva	3–6, 2–6
Loss	30.	Nov 1993	New York, US	Finals	Carpet (i)	(Latvia) Larisa Neiland	(United States) Gigi Fernández (Belarus) Natasha Zvereva	6–3, 7–5
Loss	31.	Jan 1994	Sydney, Australia	Tier II	Hard	(Spain) Arantxa Sánchez Vicario	(United States) Patty Fendick (United States) Meredith McGrath	2–6, 3–6
Win	44.	Feb 1994	Delray Beach, US	Tier II	Hard	(Spain) Arantxa Sánchez Vicario	(Netherlands) Manon Bollegraf (Czech Republic) Helena Suková	6–2, 6–0
Win	45.	Mar 1994	Tampa, US	Virginia Slims	Clay	(Spain) Arantxa Sánchez Vicario	(United States) Gigi Fernández (Belarus) Natasha Zvereva	6–2, 7–5
Win	46.	Apr 1994	Hamburg, Germany	Tier II	Clay	(Spain) Arantxa Sánchez Vicario	(Russia) Eugenia Maniokova (Georgia (country)) Leila Meskhi	6–3, 6–2
Loss	32.	May 1994	Berlin, Germany	Tier I	Clay	(Spain) Arantxa Sánchez Vicario	(United States) Gigi Fernández (Belarus) Natasha Zvereva	3–6, 6–7^{(2–7)}
Loss	33.	Jun 1994	Wimbledon	Grand Slam	Grass	(Spain) Arantxa Sánchez Vicario	(United States) Gigi Fernández (Belarus) Natasha Zvereva	4–6, 1–6
Win	47.	Aug 1994	San Diego, US	Tier II	Hard	(Spain) Arantxa Sánchez Vicario	(United States) Ginger Helgeson (Australia) Rachel McQuillan	6–3, 6–3
Loss	34.	Aug 1994	Los Angeles, US	Tier II	Hard	(United States) Lisa Raymond	(France) Julie Halard-Decugis (France) Nathalie Tauziat	1–6, 6–0, 1–6
Win	48.	Aug 1994	US Open	Grand Slam	Hard	(Spain) Arantxa Sánchez Vicario	(Bulgaria) Katerina Maleeva (United States) Robin White	6–3, 6–3
Loss	35.	Oct 1994	Brighton, UK	Tier II	Carpet (i)	(United States) Mary Joe Fernández	(Netherlands) Manon Bollegraf (Latvia) Larisa Neiland	6–4, 2–6, 3–6
Loss	36.	Nov 1994	New York, US	Finals	Carpet (i)	(Spain) Arantxa Sánchez Vicario	(United States) Gigi Fernández (Belarus) Natasha Zvereva	6–3, 6–7^{(4–7)}, 6–3
Win	49.	Jan 1995	Sydney, Australia	Tier II	Hard	(United States) Lindsay Davenport	(United States) Patty Fendick (United States) Mary Joe Fernández	7–5, 2–6, 6–4
Win	50.	Jan 1995	Australian Open	Grand Slam	Hard	(Spain) Arantxa Sánchez Vicario	(United States) Gigi Fernández (Belarus) Natasha Zvereva	6–3, 6–7^{(3–7)}, 6–4
Win	51.	Mar 1995	Delray Beach, US	Tier II	Hard	(United States) Mary Joe Fernández	(United States) Lori McNeil (Latvia) Larisa Neiland	6–4, 6–0
Win	52.	Mar 1995	Key Biscayne, US	Tier I	Hard	(Spain) Arantxa Sánchez Vicario	(United States) Gigi Fernández (Belarus) Natasha Zvereva	7–5, 2–6, 6–3
Loss	37.	May 1995	French Open	Grand Slam	Clay	(Spain) Arantxa Sánchez Vicario	(United States) Gigi Fernández (Belarus) Natasha Zvereva	7–6^{(8–6)}, 4–6, 5–7
Win	53.	Jun 1995	Eastbourne, UK	Tier II	Grass	(Spain) Arantxa Sánchez Vicario	(United States) Gigi Fernández (Belarus) Natasha Zvereva	0–6, 6–3, 6–4
Win	54.	Jun 1995	Wimbledon	Grand Slam	Grass	(Spain) Arantxa Sánchez Vicario	(United States) Gigi Fernández (Belarus) Natasha Zvereva	5–7, 7–5, 6–4
Win	55.	Nov 1995	New York, US	Finals	Carpet (i)	(Spain) Arantxa Sánchez Vicario	(United States) Gigi Fernández (Belarus) Natasha Zvereva	6–2, 6–1
Win	56.	Feb 1996	Paris, France	Tier II	Carpet (i)	(Netherlands) Kristie Boogert	(France) Julie Halard-Decugis (France) Nathalie Tauziat	6–4, 6–3
Win	57.	Mar 1996	Key Biscayne, US	Tier I	Hard	(Spain) Arantxa Sánchez Vicario	(United States) Meredith McGrath (Latvia) Larisa Neiland	6–4, 6–4
Win	58.	Apr 1996	Hilton Head, US	Tier I	Clay	(Spain) Arantxa Sánchez Vicario	(United States) Gigi Fernández (United States) Mary Joe Fernández	6–2, 6–3
Win	59.	May 1996	Madrid, Spain	Tier II	Clay	(Spain) Arantxa Sánchez Vicario	(Belgium) Sabine Appelmans (Netherlands) Miriam Oremans	7–6^{(7–4)}, 6–2
Win	60.	Jun 1996	Eastbourne, UK	Tier II	Grass	(Spain) Arantxa Sánchez Vicario	(South Africa) Rosalyn Fairbank (United States) Pam Shriver	4–6, 7–5, 6–4
Loss	38.	Aug 1996	US Open	Grand Slam	Hard	(Spain) Arantxa Sánchez Vicario	(United States) Gigi Fernández (Belarus) Natasha Zvereva	1–6, 6–1, 6–4
Win	61.	Oct 1996	Filderstadt, Germany	Tier II	Hard (i)	(United States) Nicole Arendt	(Switzerland) Martina Hingis (Czech Republic) Helena Suková	6–2, 6–3
Loss	39.	Nov 1996	New York, US	Finals	Carpet (i)	(Spain) Arantxa Sánchez Vicario	(United States) Lindsay Davenport (United States) Mary Joe Fernández	3–6, 2–6
Win	62.	Feb 1997	Paris, France	Tier II	Carpet (i)	(Switzerland) Martina Hingis	(France) Alexandra Fusai (Italy) Rita Grande	6–3, 6–0
Loss	40.	Mar 1997	Hilton Head, US	Tier I	Clay	(United States) Lindsay Davenport	(Switzerland) Martina Hingis (United States) Mary Joe Fernández	5–7, 6–4, 1–6
Win	63.	Apr 1997	Amelia Island, US	Tier II	Clay	(United States) Lindsay Davenport	(United States) Nicole Arendt (Netherlands) Manon Bollegraf	6–3, 6–0
Win	64.	May 1997	Berlin, Germany	Tier I	Clay	(United States) Lindsay Davenport	(United States) Gigi Fernández (Belarus) Natasha Zvereva	6–2, 3–6, 6–2
Win	65.	Aug 1997	US Open	Grand Slam	Hard	(United States) Lindsay Davenport	(United States) Gigi Fernández (Belarus) Natasha Zvereva	6–3, 6–4
Win	66.	Sep 1997	Leipzig, Germany	Tier II	Carpet (i)	(Switzerland) Martina Hingis	(Indonesia) Yayuk Basuki (Czech Republic) Helena Suková	6–2, 6–2
Loss	41.	Oct 1997	Filderstadt, Germany	Tier II	Hard (i)	(United States) Lindsay Davenport	(Switzerland) Martina Hingis (Spain) Arantxa Sánchez Vicario	6–7^{(4–7)}, 6–3, 6–7^{(3–7)}
Loss	42.	Nov 1997	Philadelphia, US	Tier II	Carpet (i)	(United States) Lindsay Davenport	(United States) Lisa Raymond (Australia) Rennae Stubbs	3–6, 5–7
Win	67.	Nov 1997	New York, US	Finals	Carpet (i)	(United States) Lindsay Davenport	(France) Alexandra Fusai (France) Nathalie Tauziat	6–7^{(5–7)}, 6–3, 6–2
Win	68.	Mar 1998	Key Biscayne, US	Tier I	Hard	(Switzerland) Martina Hingis	(Spain) Arantxa Sánchez Vicario (Belarus) Natasha Zvereva	6–2, 3–6, 6–3
Loss	43.	Apr 1998	Hamburg, Germany	Tier II	Clay	(Switzerland) Martina Hingis	(Austria) Barbara Schett (Switzerland) Patty Schnyder	6–7^{(3–7)}, 6–3, 3–6
Win	69.	May 1998	French Open	Grand Slam	Clay	(Switzerland) Martina Hingis	(United States) Lindsay Davenport (Belarus) Natasha Zvereva	6–1, 7–6^{(7–4)}
Win	70.	Jun 1998	Eastbourne, UK	Tier II	Grass	(South Africa) Mariaan de Swardt	(Spain) Arantxa Sanchez-Vicario (Belarus) Natasha Zvereva	6–1, 6–3
Win	71.	Jun 1998	Wimbledon	Grand Slam	Grass	(Switzerland) Martina Hingis	(United States) Lindsay Davenport (Belarus) Natasha Zvereva	6–3, 3–6, 8–6
Win	72.	Aug 1998	Montreal, Canada	Tier I	Hard	(Switzerland) Martina Hingis	(Indonesia) Yayuk Basuki (Netherlands) Caroline Vis	6–3, 6–4
Loss	44.	Aug 1998	New Haven, US	Tier II	Hard	(South Africa) Mariaan de Swardt	(France) Alexandra Fusai (France) Nathalie Tauziat	1–6, 0–6
Win	73.	Aug 1998	US Open	Grand Slam	Hard	(Switzerland) Martina Hingis	(United States) Lindsay Davenport (Belarus) Natasha Zvereva	6–3, 6–3
Loss	45.	Feb 1999	Tokyo, Japan	Tier I	Carpet (i)	(Switzerland) Martina Hingis	(United States) Lindsay Davenport (Belarus) Natasha Zvereva	2–6, 3–6
Loss	46.	Mar 1999	Indian Wells, US	Tier I	Hard	(United States) Mary Joe Fernández	(Switzerland) Martina Hingis (Russia) Anna Kournikova	2–6, 2–6
Win	74.	Mar 1999	Key Biscayne, US	Tier I	Hard	(Switzerland) Martina Hingis	(United States) Mary Joe Fernández (United States) Monica Seles	0–6, 6–4, 7–6^{(7–1)}
Win	75.	Mar 1999	Hilton Head, US	Tier I	Clay	(Russia) Elena Likhovtseva	(Austria) Barbara Schett (Switzerland) Patty Schnyder	6–1, 6–4
Loss	47.	Apr 1999	Hamburg, Germany	Tier II	Clay	(South Africa) Amanda Coetzer	(Latvia) Larisa Neiland (Spain) Arantxa Sánchez Vicario	2–6, 1–6
Loss	48.	May 1999	Berlin, Germany	Tier I	Clay	(Argentina) Patricia Tarabini	(France) Alexandra Fusai (France) Nathalie Tauziat	3–6, 5–7
Loss	49.	Jun 1999	Eastbourne, UK	Tier II	Grass	(Belarus) Natasha Zvereva	(Switzerland) Martina Hingis (Russia) Anna Kournikova	4–6, ret.
Win	76.	Aug 1999	Toronto, Canada	Tier I	Hard	(France) Mary Pierce	(Latvia) Larisa Neiland (Spain) Arantxa Sánchez Vicario	6–3, 2–6, 6–3
Loss	50.	Aug 1999	New Haven, US	Tier II	Hard	(Russia) Elena Likhovtseva	(United States) Lisa Raymond (Australia) Rennae Stubbs	6–7^{(1–7)}, 2–6

== Awards and recognitions ==
- 1989: WTA Doubles Team of the Year with Helena Suková
- 1990: WTA Doubles Team of the Year with Helena Suková
- 1991: WTA Doubles Team of the Year with Gigi Fernández
- 1996: WTA Doubles Team of the Year with Arantxa Sánchez Vicario
- 1997: ITF World Champions (Women's Doubles) with Lindsay Davenport
- 1998: WTA Doubles Team of the Year with Martina Hingis
- 2005: International Tennis Hall of Fame

== WTA Tour career earnings ==
Year	Grand Slam titles (Note: Includes singles, doubles and mixed doubles titles.)	WTA titles	Total titles	Earnings ($)	Money list rank
1986–88	0	1	1	439,958	n/a
1989	0	1	1	360,896	7
1990	0	1	1	645,500	5
1991	0	2	2	766,369	6
1992	0	0	0	511,184	8
1993	0	2	2	926,646	6
1994	0	3	3	876,119	4
1995	0	1	1	787,936	5
1996	0	4	4	1,354,307	3
1997	0	4	4	1,685,115	2
1998	1	3	4	2,153,800	3
1999	0	1	1	741,454	11
Career	1	23	24	11,249,284	19
