= 1993 Nokia Grand Prix – Singles =

Singles
- 1993 Nokia Grand Prix

Final
- Champion: (Ukraine) Natalia Medvedeva
- Runner-up: (Spain) Conchita Martínez
- Score: 6–7^{(4–7)}, 7–5, 6–4

Details
- Draw: 32 (2WC/4Q/1LL)
- Seeds: 8

Events
Singles	Doubles
← 1992 ·	Faber Grand Prix	· 1994 →

Monica Seles was the defending champion, but did not compete this year after being stabbed in the back in April.

Natalia Medvedeva won the title by defeating Conchita Martínez 6–7^{(4–7)}, 7–5, 6–4 in the final.

== Seeds ==
1. (Spain) Arantxa Sánchez Vicario (semifinals)
2. (Spain) Conchita Martínez (final)
3. (Germany) Anke Huber (second round)
4. (Switzerland) Manuela Maleeva-Fragnière (quarterfinals)
5. (Czech Republic) Helena Suková (first round)
6. (France) Mary Pierce (quarterfinals)
7. (Bulgaria) Katerina Maleeva (quarterfinals)
8. (France) Julie Halard (second round)

== Draw ==
Key

- Q = Qualifier
- WC = Wild card
- LL = Lucky loser
- Alt = Alternate
- ITF = ITF entry
- PR = Protected ranking
- SR = Special ranking
- SE = Special exempt
- JE = Junior exempt
- JR = Junior Accelerator Programme entrant
- CO = College Accelerator Programme entrant
- NG = Next Gen Accelerator Program entrant
- w/o = Walkover
- r = Retired
- d = Defaulted

=== Finals ===
Semifinals
1	(Spain) Arantxa Sánchez Vicario	4	6	4
(Ukraine) Natalia Medvedeva	6	2	6
(Belgium) Sabine Appelmans	3	5
2	(Spain) Conchita Martínez	6	7

Final
(Ukraine) Natalia Medvedeva	6^{4}	7	6
2	(Spain) Conchita Martínez	7^{7}	5	4

=== Top half ===
First round
1	(Spain) A Sánchez Vicario	6	6
Q	(Croatia) S Talaja	1	1
(Netherlands) M Oremans	6	6
(Austria) B Reinstadler	1	3
(Netherlands) K Boogert	6	6
Q	(Sweden) Å Carlsson	2	0
(United States) N Arendt	0	3
6	(France) M Pierce	6	6
3	(Germany) A Huber	6	2	7
(Germany) W Probst	4	6	5
(Ukraine) N Medvedeva	6	7^{7}
Q	(Germany) P Begerow	2	6^{4}
Q	(United States) E deLone	3	1
(South Africa) E Reinach	6	6
WC	(Croatia) I Majoli	4	6	3
8	(France) J Halard	6	4	6

Second round
1	(Spain) A Sánchez Vicario	7	2	6
(Netherlands) M Oremans	5	6	4
(Netherlands) K Boogert	2	6^{4}
6	(France) M Pierce	6	7^{7}
3	(Germany) A Huber	4	2
(Ukraine) N Medvedeva	6	6
(South Africa) E Reinach	6	6^{5}	6
8	(France) J Halard	3	7^{7}	4

Quarterfinals
1	(Spain) A Sánchez Vicario	2	6	6
6	(France) M Pierce	6	4	1
(Ukraine) N Medvedeva	6	6
(South Africa) E Reinach	0	3

Semifinals
1	(Spain) A Sánchez Vicario	4	6	4
(Ukraine) N Medvedeva	6	2	6

=== Bottom half ===
First round
5	(Czech Republic) H Suková	3	6	3
(Netherlands) N Muns-Jagerman	6	4	6
WC	(Finland) N Dahlman	5	5
(Belgium) S Appelmans	7	7
(Slovakia) R Zrubáková	3	3
(Georgia (country)) L Meskhi	6	6
(Austria) S Dopfer	4	2
4	(Switzerland) M Maleeva-Fragnière	6	6
7	(Bulgaria) K Maleeva	6	6
(Italy) L Golarsa	1	4
(Germany) C Singer	6	3	3
(Czech Republic) R Bobková	4	6	6
(Germany) B Rittner	6	6
(Italy) MF Bentivoglio	3	0
LL	(United States) A Mall	2	4
2	(Spain) C Martínez	6	6

Second round
(Netherlands) N Muns-Jagerman	4	3
(Belgium) S Appelmans	6	6
(Georgia (country)) L Meskhi	3	1
4	(Switzerland) M Maleeva-Fragnière	6	6
7	(Bulgaria) K Maleeva	6	6
(Czech Republic) R Bobková	4	2
(Germany) B Rittner	3	4
2	(Spain) C Martínez	6	6

Quarterfinals
(Belgium) S Appelmans	2	6	7
4	(Switzerland) M Maleeva-Fragnière	6	1	5
7	(Bulgaria) K Maleeva	2	2
2	(Spain) C Martínez	6	6

Semifinals
(Belgium) S Appelmans	3	5
2	(Spain) C Martínez	6	7
