= 1993 Nokia Grand Prix – Doubles =

Doubles
- 1993 Nokia Grand Prix

Final
- Champions: (Spain) Arantxa Sánchez Vicario (Czech Republic) Helena Suková
- Runners-up: (Germany) Wiltrud Probst (Germany) Christina Singer
- Score: 6–2, 6–2

Details
- Draw: 16 (1WC/1Q)
- Seeds: 4

Events
Singles	Doubles
← 1992 ·	Faber Grand Prix	· 1994 →

Katerina Maleeva and Barbara Rittner were the defending champions, but Maleeva did not compete this year as she only focused on the singles tournament. Rittner teamed up with Elna Reinach and lost in the semifinals to Arantxa Sánchez Vicario and Helena Suková.

Sánchez Vicario and Suková won the title by defeating Wiltrud Probst and Christina Singer 6–2, 6–2 in the final.

== Seeds ==
1. (Spain) Arantxa Sánchez Vicario / (Czech Republic) Helena Suková (champions)
2. (Russia) Eugenia Maniokova / (Georgia (country)) Leila Meskhi (first round)
3. (South Africa) Elna Reinach / (Germany) Barbara Rittner (semifinals)
4. (Netherlands) Miriam Oremans / (Netherlands) Caroline Vis (first round)

== Draw ==
Key

- Q = Qualifier
- WC = Wild card
- LL = Lucky loser
- Alt = Alternate
- ITF = ITF entry
- PR = Protected ranking
- SR = Special ranking
- SE = Special exempt
- JE = Junior exempt
- JR = Junior Accelerator Programme entrant
- CO = College Accelerator Programme entrant
- NG = Next Gen Accelerator Program entrant
- w/o = Walkover
- r = Retired
- d = Defaulted

=== Draw ===
First round
1	(Spain) A Sánchez Vicario (Czech Republic) H Suková	6	6
(Austria) S Dopfer (Germany) R Kochta	2	3
(Netherlands) C Bakkum (Sweden) Å Carlsson	6	6
(Austria) B Reinstadler (Israel) Y Segal	2	1
3	(South Africa) E Reinach (Germany) B Rittner	6	6
(Czech Republic) R Bobková (Germany) A Kerek	2	2
Q	(United States) A Mall (Austria) Nina Murn	7	4	2
WC	(United States) Ra Jensen (United States) A Leand	5	6	6
(United States) N Arendt (France) C Tanvier	1	2
(Netherlands) K Boogert (Netherlands) N Muns-Jagerman	6	6
(Italy) L Golarsa (Ukraine) N Medvedeva	6	7
4	(Netherlands) M Oremans (Netherlands) C Vis	4	5
(United States) A deLone (United States) E deLone	6	3	3
(Germany) W Probst (Germany) C Singer	3	6	6
(Finland) N Dahlman (Croatia) M Murić	5	7^{7}	6
2	(Russia) E Maniokova (Georgia (country)) L Meskhi	7	6^{2}	4

Quarterfinals
1	(Spain) A Sánchez Vicario (Czech Republic) H Suková	6	6
(Netherlands) C Bakkum (Sweden) Å Carlsson	2	1
3	(South Africa) E Reinach (Germany) B Rittner	6	6
WC	(United States) Ra Jensen (United States) A Leand	2	0
(Netherlands) K Boogert (Netherlands) N Muns-Jagerman	4	7^{7}	7
(Italy) L Golarsa (Ukraine) N Medvedeva	6	6^{5}	5
(Germany) W Probst (Germany) C Singer	6	7
(Finland) N Dahlman (Croatia) M Murić	4	5

Semifinals
1	(Spain) A Sánchez Vicario (Czech Republic) H Suková	7^{7}	6
3	(South Africa) E Reinach (Germany) B Rittner	6^{2}	2
(Netherlands) K Boogert (Netherlands) N Muns-Jagerman	6^{5}	6	2
(Germany) W Probst (Germany) C Singer	7^{7}	0	6

Final
1	(Spain) A Sánchez Vicario (Czech Republic) H Suková	6	6
(Germany) W Probst (Germany) C Singer	2	2
