= 1999 Faber Grand Prix =

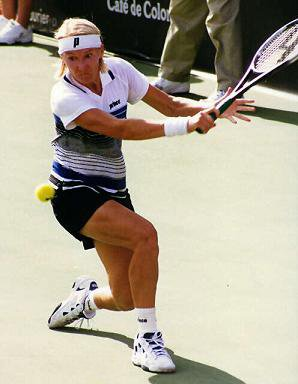
- Date: 15–21 February
- Edition: 7th
- Category: Tier II
- Draw: 28S / 16D
- Prize money: $520,000
- Location: Hannover, Germany

Champions

Singles
- (Czech Republic) Jana Novotná

Doubles
- (United States) Serena Williams / (United States) Venus Williams
| ← 1998 · | Faber Grand Prix | · 2000 → |

The 1999 Faber Grand Prix was a women's tennis tournament played on indoor hardcourts in Hannover, Germany that was part of Tier II of the 1999 WTA Tour. It was the seventh edition of the tournament and was held from 15 February until 21 February 1999. First-seeded Jana Novotná won the singles title and earned $80,000 first-prize money.

== Finals ==
=== Singles ===
(Czech Republic) Jana Novotná defeated (United States) Venus Williams, 6–4, 6–4

- It was Novotná's only singles title of the year and the 24th and last of her career.

=== Doubles ===
(United States) Serena Williams / (United States) Venus Williams defeated (France) Alexandra Fusai / (France) Nathalie Tauziat, 5–7, 6–2, 6–2

== Entrants ==
=== Seeds ===
| Country | Player | Rank | Seed |
|---|---|---|---|
| CZE | Jana Novotná | 3 | 1 |
| USA | Venus Williams | 6 | 2 |
| GER | Steffi Graf | 7 | 3 |
| SUI | Patty Schnyder | 8 | 4 |
| FRA | Nathalie Tauziat | 10 | 5 |
| FRA | Sandrine Testud | 15 | 7 |
| AUT | Barbara Schett | 19 | 8 |
| ITA | Silvia Farina | 20 | 9 |

=== Other entrants ===
The following players received wildcards into the singles main draw:

- (Germany) Andrea Glass
- (United States) Jennifer Capriati
- (Belgium) Sabine Appelmans

The following players received wildcards into the doubles main draw:

- (United States) Jennifer Capriati / (Germany) Steffi Graf

The following players received entry from the qualifying draw:

- (France) Émilie Loit
- (France) Anne-Gaëlle Sidot
- (Slovakia) Karina Habšudová
- (Germany) Barbara Rittner

The following player received entry as a lucky loser:

- (Netherlands) Miriam Oremans
