= 1996 Páginas Amarillas Open – Doubles =

Doubles
- 1996 Páginas Amarillas Open

Final
- Champions: (Czech Republic) Jana Novotná (Spain) Arantxa Sánchez Vicario
- Runners-up: (Belgium) Sabine Appelmans (Netherlands) Miriam Oremans
- Score: 7–6, 6–2

Details
- Draw: 14
- Seeds: 4

Events
Singles	Doubles
WTA Madrid Open	· 1997 →

Jana Novotná and Arantxa Sánchez Vicario won in the final 7–6, 6–2 against Sabine Appelmans and Miriam Oremans.

== Seeds ==
Champion seeds are indicated in bold text while text in italics indicates the round in which those seeds were eliminated. The top two seeded teams received byes into the quarterfinals.

1. (Czech Republic) **Jana Novotná** / (Spain) **Arantxa Sánchez Vicario (champions)**
2. (United States) Lisa Raymond / (Australia) Rennae Stubbs (quarterfinals)
3. (Belgium) Sabine Appelmans / (Netherlands) Miriam Oremans (final)
4. (United States) Amy Frazier / (United States) Kimberly Po (quarterfinals)

== Draw ==
=== Key ===
- Q = Qualifier
- WC = Wild card
- LL = Lucky loser
- Alt = Alternate
- ITF = ITF entry
- PR = Protected ranking
- SR = Special ranking
- SE = Special exempt
- JE = Junior exempt
- JR = Junior Accelerator Programme entrant
- CO = College Accelerator Programme entrant
- NG = Next Gen Accelerator Program entrant
- w/o = Walkover
- r = Retired
- d = Defaulted

First round
(Spain) P Aznar (Spain) E Bes Ostariz	1	6
(Italy) **R Grande** (Russia) **E Likhovtseva**	**6**	**7**
4	(United States) **A Frazier** (United States) **K Po**	6	**6**	**7**
(Argentina) F Labat (Australia) L Pleming	**7**	4	5
(United Kingdom) V Lake (Australia) T Morton-Rodgers	3	1
(Spain) **V Ruano-Pascual** (Spain) **M Sánchez Lorenzo**	**6**	**6**
WC	(Spain) C Lopez de Subijana (Spain) E Salvador	**w/o**
(Czech Republic) R Bobková (South Africa) J Kruger
(Spain) N Serra (Spain) C Torrens Valero	0	1
3	(Belgium) **S Appelmans** (Netherlands) **M Oremans**	**6**	**6**
(Poland) K Nowak (Spain) A Ortuño	6	**6**	4
(Austria) **B Schett** (Switzerland) **P Schnyder**	**7**	5	**6**

Quarterfinals
1	(Czech Republic) **J Novotná** (Spain) **A Sánchez Vicario**	**6**	**7**
(Italy) R Grande (Russia) E Likhovtseva	4	5
4	(United States) A Frazier (United States) K Po	4	**6**	4
(Spain) **V Ruano-Pascual** (Spain) **M Sánchez Lorenzo**	**6**	2	**6**
WC	(Spain) C Lopez de Subijana (Spain) E Salvador	4	4
3	(Belgium) **S Appelmans** (Netherlands) **M Oremans**	**6**	**6**
(Austria) **B Schett** (Switzerland) **P Schnyder**	**6**	**6**
2	(United States) L Raymond (Australia) R Stubbs	2	2

Semifinals
1	(Czech Republic) **J Novotná** (Spain) **A Sánchez Vicario**	**6**	**6**
(Spain) V Ruano-Pascual (Spain) M Sánchez Lorenzo	3	1
3	(Belgium) **S Appelmans** (Netherlands) **M Oremans**	4	**7**	**6**
(Austria) B Schett (Switzerland) P Schnyder	**6**	6	3

Final
1	(Czech Republic) **Jana Novotná** (Spain) **Arantxa Sánchez Vicario**	**7**	**6**
3	(Belgium) Sabine Appelmans (Netherlands) Miriam Oremans	6	2
