= 2000 Faber Grand Prix – Doubles =

Doubles
- 2000 Faber Grand Prix

Final
- Champions: (Sweden) Åsa Carlsson (Belarus) Natasha Zvereva
- Runners-up: (Italy) Silvia Farina (Slovakia) Karina Habšudová
- Score: 6–3, 6–4

Events
Singles	Doubles
← 1999 ·	Faber Grand Prix

Serena and Venus Williams were the reigning champions, but none competed this year.

Åsa Carlsson and Natasha Zvereva won the title by defeating Silvia Farina and Karina Habšudová 6–3, 6–4 in the final.

== Seeds ==
1. (Russia) Elena Likhovtseva / (France) Nathalie Tauziat (quarterfinals)
2. (Romania) Irina Spîrlea / (Netherlands) Caroline Vis (first round)
3. (Sweden) Åsa Carlsson / (Belarus) Natasha Zvereva (champions)
4. (Italy) Silvia Farina / (Slovakia) Karina Habšudová (final)

== Draw ==
=== Key ===
- Q = Qualifier
- WC = Wild card
- LL = Lucky loser
- Alt = Alternate
- SE = Special exempt
- PR = Protected ranking
- ITF = ITF entry
- JE = Junior exempt
- w/o = Walkover
- r = Retired
- d = Defaulted
- SR = Special ranking

=== Draw ===
First round
1	(Russia) E Likhovtseva (France) N Tauziat	6	6
(Germany) A Bachmann (Slovenia) T Pisnik	4	4
(Czech Republic) K Hrdličková (Germany) C Schneider	2	4
(Netherlands) K Boogert (Netherlands) M Oremans	6	6
4	(Italy) S Farina (Slovakia) K Habšudová	6	2
(Austria) K Kschwendt (Federal Republic of Yugoslavia) S Načuk	0	0^{r}
(Australia) C Barclay (France) AG Sidot	7^{7}	6
Q	(Luxembourg) A Kremer (Canada) V Webb	6^{4}	4
(Canada) S Jeyaseelan (Switzerland) P Schnyder	3	7	6
(Germany) J Abe (Russia) N Petrova	6	5	3
WC	(Germany) M Buric (Germany) A Huber	6^{4}	4
3	(Sweden) Å Carlsson (Belarus) N Zvereva	7^{7}	6
(Netherlands) A Hopmans (Croatia) S Talaja	1	5
(Belgium) K Clijsters (Belgium) L Courtois	6	7
(Romania) C Cristea (Romania) R Dragomir	6	6^{6}	6
2	(Romania) I Spîrlea (Netherlands) C Vis	1	7^{8}	1

Quarterfinals
1	(Russia) E Likhovtseva (France) N Tauziat	3	2
(Netherlands) K Boogert (Netherlands) M Oremans	6	6
4	(Italy) S Farina (Slovakia) K Habšudová	7	0	6
(Australia) C Barclay (France) AG Sidot	5	6	3
(Canada) S Jeyaseelan (Switzerland) P Schnyder	3	3
3	(Sweden) Å Carlsson (Belarus) N Zvereva	6	6
(Belgium) K Clijsters (Belgium) L Courtois	6	6
(Romania) C Cristea (Romania) R Dragomir	4	4

Semifinals
(Netherlands) K Boogert (Netherlands) M Oremans	6	3	4
4	(Italy) S Farina (Slovakia) K Habšudová	3	6	6
3	(Sweden) Å Carlsson (Belarus) N Zvereva	7^{7}	7^{7}
(Belgium) K Clijsters (Belgium) L Courtois	6^{3}	6^{3}

Final
4	(Italy) S Farina (Slovakia) K Habšudová	3	4
3	(Sweden) Å Carlsson (Belarus) N Zvereva	6	6
