= 1998 Faber Grand Prix =

- Date: 16–22 February
- Edition: 6th
- Category: Tier II
- Draw: 28S / 16D
- Surface: Carpet / indoor
- Location: Hanover, Germany

Champions

Singles
- (Switzerland) Patty Schnyder

Doubles
- (United States) Lisa Raymond / (Australia) Rennae Stubbs
← 1997 ·	Faber Grand Prix	· 1999 →

The 1998 Faber Grand Prix was a women's tennis tournament played on indoor carpet courts in Hanover, in Germany that was part of Tier II of the 1998 WTA Tour. The tournament was held from 16 February until 22 February 1998. Unseeded Patty Schnyder won the singles title and earned $79,000 first-prize money.

== Finals ==
=== Singles ===
(Switzerland) Patty Schnyder defeated (Czech Republic) Jana Novotná 6–0, 2–6, 7–5

- It was Schnyder's 2nd title of the year and the 2nd of her career.

=== Doubles ===
(United States) Lisa Raymond / (Australia) Rennae Stubbs defeated (Russia) Elena Likhovtseva / (Netherlands) Caroline Vis 6–1, 6–7, 6–3

- It was Raymond's 1st title of the year and the 10th of her career. It was Stubbs' 1st title of the year and the 14th of her career.
