= 1997 Faber Grand Prix – Doubles =

Doubles
- 1997 Faber Grand Prix
- 1996 Champions: (United States) Meredith McGrath (Latvia) Larisa Savchenko

Final
- Champions: (United States) Nicole Arendt (Netherlands) Manon Bollegraf
- Runners-up: (Latvia) Larisa Savchenko (Netherlands) Brenda Schultz-McCarthy
- Score: 4–6, 6–3, 7–6

Details
- Draw: 16
- Seeds: 4

Events
Singles	Doubles
← 1996 ·	Faber Grand Prix	· 1998 →

Meredith McGrath and Larisa Savchenko were the defending champions but only Savchenko competed that year with Brenda Schultz-McCarthy.

Savchenko and Schultz-McCarthy lost in the final 4–6, 6–3, 7–6 against Nicole Arendt and Manon Bollegraf.

== Seeds ==
Champion seeds are indicated in bold text while text in italics indicates the round in which those seeds were eliminated.

1. (Latvia) Larisa Savchenko / (Netherlands) Brenda Schultz-McCarthy (final)
2. (United States) **Nicole Arendt** / (Netherlands) **Manon Bollegraf (champions)**
3. (Indonesia) Yayuk Basuki / (Netherlands) Caroline Vis (first round)
4. (Belgium) Sabine Appelmans / (Netherlands) Miriam Oremans (first round)

== Draw ==
=== Key ===
- Q = Qualifier
- WC = Wild card
- LL = Lucky loser
- Alt = Alternate
- ITF = ITF entry
- PR = Protected ranking
- SR = Special ranking
- SE = Special exempt
- JE = Junior exempt
- JR = Junior Accelerator Programme entrant
- CO = College Accelerator Programme entrant
- NG = Next Gen Accelerator Program entrant
- w/o = Walkover
- r = Retired
- d = Defaulted

First round
1	(Latvia) **L Savchenko** (Netherlands) **B Schultz-McCarthy**	**6**	**6**
Q	(Germany) A Roesch (Germany) J Wöhr	4	4
(Czech Republic) E Martincová (France) A-G Sidot	2	4
(Sweden) **Å Carlsson** (Italy) **F Perfetti**	**6**	**6**
3	(Indonesia) Y Basuki (Netherlands) C Vis	2	1
(Italy) **S Farina** (Austria) **B Schett**	**6**	**6**
(Belgium) E Callens (Australia) A Ellwood	5	3
(Argentina) **F Labat** (Russia) **E Likhovtseva**	**7**	**6**
(Germany) **B Rittner** (Belgium) **D Van Roost**	**6**	**6**
(Italy) L Golarsa (Germany) C Singer	2	4
(Romania) **R Dragomir** (Croatia) **I Majoli**	**7**	**7**
4	(Belgium) S Appelmans (Netherlands) M Oremans	5	6
(Czech Republic) E Melicharová (Czech Republic) H Vildová	4	4
(Slovenia) **T Križan** (France) **N van Lottum**	**6**	**6**
(Germany) A Huber (Germany) W Probst	4	1
2	(United States) **N Arendt** (Netherlands) **M Bollegraf**	**6**	**6**

Quarterfinals
1	(Latvia) **L Savchenko** (Netherlands) **B Schultz-McCarthy**	**6**	**7**
(Sweden) Å Carlsson (Italy) F Perfetti	1	6
(Italy) S Farina (Austria) B Schett	3	6
(Argentina) **F Labat** (Russia) **E Likhovtseva**	**6**	**7**
(Germany) B Rittner (Belgium) D Van Roost
(Romania) **R Dragomir** (Croatia) **I Majoli**	**w/o**
(Slovenia) T Križan (France) N van Lottum	0	2
2	(United States) **N Arendt** (Netherlands) **M Bollegraf**	**6**	**6**

Semifinals
1	(Latvia) **L Savchenko** (Netherlands) **B Schultz-McCarthy**	**6**	**6**
(Argentina) F Labat (Russia) E Likhovtseva	2	2
(Romania) R Dragomir (Croatia) I Majoli	3	3
2	(United States) **N Arendt** (Netherlands) **M Bollegraf**	**6**	**6**

Final
1	(Latvia) Larisa Savchenko (Netherlands) Brenda Schultz-McCarthy	**6**	3	6
2	(United States) **Nicole Arendt** (Netherlands) **Manon Bollegraf**	4	**6**	**7**
