= 2000 Faber Grand Prix =

- Date: 14–20 February
- Edition: 8th
- Category: Tier II
- Draw: 28S / 16D
- Prize money: $535,000
- Surface: Hard / indoor
- Location: Hannover, Germany
- Venue: Deutscher Tennis Verein Hannover

Champions

Singles
- (United States) Serena Williams

Doubles
- (Sweden) Åsa Carlsson / (Belarus) Natasha Zvereva
| ← 1999 · | Faber Grand Prix |

The 2000 Faber Grand Prix was a women's tennis tournament played on indoor hardcourts in Hannover, Germany that was part of Tier II of the 2000 WTA Tour. It was the eighth and last edition of the tournament and was held from 14 February until 20 February 2000. First-seeded Serena Williams won the singles title and earned $87,000 first-prize money.

== Finals ==
=== Singles ===
(United States) Serena Williams defeated (Czech Republic) Denisa Chládková, 6–1, 6–1

- It was Williams's 1st title of the year and the 6th of her career.

=== Doubles ===
(Sweden) Åsa Carlsson / (Belarus) Natasha Zvereva defeated (Italy) Silvia Farina / (Slovakia) Karina Habšudová, 6–3, 6–4
