= 1993 Nokia Grand Prix =

- Date: 25–31 October
- Edition: 2nd
- Category: Tier II
- Draw: 32S / 16D
- Prize money: $375,000
- Surface: Hard / indoor
- Location: Essen, Germany
- Venue: Grugahalle Essen

Champions

Singles
- (Ukraine) Natalia Medvedeva

Doubles
- (Spain) Arantxa Sánchez Vicario / (Czech Republic) Helena Suková
← 1992 ·	Faber Grand Prix	· 1994 →

The 1993 Nokia Grand Prix was a women's tennis tournament played on indoor hardcourts at the Grugahalle in Essen in Germany that was part of Tier II of the 1993 WTA Tour. It was the second edition of the tournament and was held from 25 October until 31 October 1993. Unseeded Natalia Medvedeva won the singles title and earned $75,000 first-prize money.

== Finals ==
=== Singles ===
(Ukraine) Natalia Medvedeva defeated (Spain) Conchita Martínez 6–7^{(4–7)}, 7–5, 6–4

- It was Medvedeva's 2nd and last singles title of the year and the 4th and last of her career.

=== Doubles ===
(Spain) Arantxa Sánchez Vicario / (Czech Republic) Helena Suková defeated (Germany) Wiltrud Probst / (Germany) Christina Singer 6–2, 6–2

- It was Sánchez Vicario's 5th and last doubles title of the year and the 23rd of her career. It was Suková's 8th and last doubles title of the year and the 61st of her career.

== Prize money ==
Event	W	F	SF	QF	Round of 16	Round of 32
Singles	$75,000	$33,750	$16,925	$8,450	$3,400	$2,250
