= 1997 Faber Grand Prix =

- Date: 17–23 February
- Edition: 5th
- Category: Tier II
- Draw: 28S / 16D
- Prize money: $450,000
- Surface: Carpet / indoors
- Location: Hanover, Germany

Champions

Singles
- (Croatia) Iva Majoli

Doubles
- (United States) Nicole Arendt / (Netherlands) Manon Bollegraf
← 1996 ·	Faber Grand Prix	· 1998 →

The 1997 Faber Grand Prix was a women's tennis tournament played on indoor carpet courts in Hanover, Germany that was part of Tier II of the 1997 WTA Tour. It was the fifth edition of the tournament and was held from 17 February until 23 February 1997. Third-seeded Iva Majoli won her second consecutive singles title at the event.

== Finals ==
=== Singles ===
(Croatia) Iva Majoli defeated (Czech Republic) Jana Novotná 4–6, 7–6^{(7–2)}, 6–4

- It was Majoli's 1st singles title of the year and the 5th of her career.

=== Doubles ===
(United States) Nicole Arendt / (Netherlands) Manon Bollegraf defeated (Latvia) Larisa Savchenko / (Netherlands) Brenda Schultz-McCarthy 4–6, 6–3, 7–6^{(7–4)}

- It was Arendt's 1st doubles title of the year and the 10th of her career. It was Bollegraf's 1st doubles title of the year and the 23rd of her career.
