= 1997 Páginas Amarillas Open – Doubles =

Doubles
- 1997 Páginas Amarillas Open
- 1996 Champions: (Czech Republic) Jana Novotná (Spain) Arantxa Sánchez Vicario

Final
- Champions: (United States) Mary Joe Fernández (Spain) Arantxa Sánchez Vicario
- Runners-up: (Argentina) Inés Gorrochategui (Romania) Irina Spîrlea
- Score: 6–3, 6–2

Details
- Draw: 15
- Seeds: 4

Events
Singles	Doubles
← 1996 ·	WTA Madrid Open	· 1998 →

Jana Novotná and Arantxa Sánchez Vicario were the defending champions but only Sánchez Vicario competed that year with Mary Joe Fernández.

Fernández and Sánchez Vicario won in the final 6–3, 6–2 against Inés Gorrochategui and Irina Spîrlea.

== Seeds ==
Champion seeds are indicated in bold text while text in italics indicates the round in which those seeds were eliminated. The top seeded team received a bye into the quarterfinals.

1. (United States) **Mary Joe Fernández** / (Spain) **Arantxa Sánchez Vicario (champions)**
2. (United States) Amy Frazier / (United States) Kimberly Po (first round)
3. (Japan) Rika Hiraki / (Argentina) Florencia Labat (quarterfinals)
4. (Switzerland) Patty Schnyder / (United States) Linda Wild (quarterfinals)

== Draw ==
=== Key ===
- Q = Qualifier
- WC = Wild card
- LL = Lucky loser
- Alt = Alternate
- ITF = ITF entry
- PR = Protected ranking
- SR = Special ranking
- SE = Special exempt
- JE = Junior exempt
- JR = Junior Accelerator Programme entrant
- CO = College Accelerator Programme entrant
- NG = Next Gen Accelerator Program entrant
- w/o = Walkover
- r = Retired
- d = Defaulted

First round
(Sweden) **Å Carlsson** (United States) **A Grossman**	**6**	**6**
(Spain) G León García (Spain) V Ruano-Pascual	1	3
3	(Japan) **R Hiraki** (Argentina) **F Labat**	**6**	**6**
(Italy) S Cecchini (Spain) M Serna	2	4
(Australia) **A Ellwood** (Australia) **L Pleming**	**6**	**7**
(Spain) M Cano (Spain) A Montero	3	5
WC	(Spain) C Martínez Granados (Spain) E Salvador	1	2
(Argentina) **I Gorrochategui** (Romania) **I Spîrlea**	**6**	**6**
(Romania) C Cristea (Austria) M Maruska	3	4
4	(Switzerland) **P Schnyder** (United States) **L Wild**	**6**	**6**
(Argentina) M-F Cianfagna (Spain) A Ortuño	1	1
(Croatia) **M Murić** (United States) **T Whitlinger-Jones**	**6**	**6**
(Australia) **C Barclay** (United Kingdom) **C Wood**	**7**	**6**
2	(United States) A Frazier (United States) K Po	5	1

Quarterfinals
1	(United States) **M J Fernández** (Spain) **A Sánchez Vicario**	**6**	**6**
(Sweden) Å Carlsson (United States) A Grossman	3	2
3	(Japan) R Hiraki (Argentina) F Labat	5	**7**	6
(Australia) **A Ellwood** (Australia) **L Pleming**	**7**	6	**7**
(Argentina) **I Gorrochategui** (Romania) **I Spîrlea**	**6**	**6**
4	(Switzerland) P Schnyder (United States) L Wild	0	0
(Croatia) M Murić (United States) T Whitlinger-Jones	**6**	6	5
(Australia) **C Barclay** (United Kingdom) **C Wood**	2	**7**	**7**

Semifinals
1	(United States) **M J Fernández** (Spain) **A Sánchez Vicario**	**6**	**7**
(Australia) A Ellwood (Australia) L Pleming	0	5
(Argentina) **I Gorrochategui** (Romania) **I Spîrlea**	**7**	6	**6**
(Australia) C Barclay (United Kingdom) C Wood	6	**7**	4

Final
1	(United States) **Mary Joe Fernández** (Spain) **Arantxa Sánchez Vicario**	**6**	**6**
(Argentina) Inés Gorrochategui (Romania) Irina Spîrlea	3	2
