= 1998 Faber Grand Prix – Doubles =

Doubles
- 1998 Faber Grand Prix
- 1997 Champions: (United States) Nicole Arendt (Netherlands) Manon Bollegraf

Final
- Champions: (United States) Lisa Raymond (Australia) Rennae Stubbs
- Runners-up: (Russia) Elena Likhovtseva (Netherlands) Caroline Vis
- Score: 6–1, 6–7, 6–3

Events
Singles	Doubles
← 1997 ·	Faber Grand Prix	· 1999 →

Nicole Arendt and Manon Bollegraf were the defending champions but only Bollegraf competed that year with Jana Novotná.

Bollegraf and Novotná lost in the semifinals to Elena Likhovtseva and Caroline Vis.

Lisa Raymond and Rennae Stubbs won in the final 6–1, 6–7, 6–3 against Likhovtseva and Vis.

== Seeds ==
Champion seeds are indicated in bold text while text in italics indicates the round in which those seeds were eliminated.

1. (Netherlands) Manon Bollegraf / (Czech Republic) Jana Novotná (semifinals)
2. (France) Alexandra Fusai / (France) Nathalie Tauziat (semifinals)
3. (Russia) Elena Likhovtseva / (Netherlands) Caroline Vis (final)
4. (United States) **Lisa Raymond** / (Australia) **Rennae Stubbs (champions)**

== Draw ==
=== Key ===
- Q = Qualifier
- WC = Wild card
- LL = Lucky loser
- Alt = Alternate
- SE = Special exempt
- PR = Protected ranking
- ITF = ITF entry
- JE = Junior exempt
- w/o = Walkover
- r = Retired
- d = Defaulted
- SR = Special ranking

First round
1	(Netherlands) **M Bollegraf** (Czech Republic) **J Novotná**	**6**	**6**
(Romania) R Dragomir (Switzerland) P Schnyder	4	3
WC	(Germany) **S Graf** (Germany) **B Rittner**	**6**	**6**
(Germany) M Babel (Germany) W Probst	3	1
3	(Russia) **E Likhovtseva** (Netherlands) **C Vis**	**6**	**6**
(Czech Republic) R Bobková (Germany) A Schneider	1	2
(Bulgaria) M Maleeva (France) A-G Sidot	3	4
(Russia) **A Kournikova** (Latvia) **L Savchenko**	**6**	**6**
(Poland) M Grzybowska (Czech Republic) E Melicharová	**7**	5	3
(Argentina) **F Labat** (Belgium) **D Van Roost**	5	**7**	**6**
(Germany) A Huber (Romania) I Spîrlea
4	(United States) **L Raymond** (Australia) **R Stubbs**	**w/o**
(Belgium) **S Appelmans** (Netherlands) **M Oremans**	**7**	**6**
(Sweden) Å Carlsson (Germany) E Wagner	5	4
(Italy) S Farina (Austria) B Schett	4	0
2	(France) **A Fusai** (France) **N Tauziat**	**6**	**6**

Quarterfinals
1	(Netherlands) **M Bollegraf** (Czech Republic) **J Novotná**	4	**6**	**6**
WC	(Germany) S Graf (Germany) B Rittner	**6**	2	2
3	(Russia) **E Likhovtseva** (Netherlands) **C Vis**	3	**6**	**7**
(Russia) A Kournikova (Latvia) L Savchenko	**6**	2	5
(Argentina) F Labat (Belgium) D Van Roost
4	(United States) **L Raymond** (Australia) **R Stubbs**	**w/o**
(Belgium) S Appelmans (Netherlands) M Oremans	**7**	4	5
2	(France) **A Fusai** (France) **N Tauziat**	5	**6**	**7**

Semifinals
1	(Netherlands) M Bollegraf (Czech Republic) J Novotná
3	(Russia) **E Likhovtseva** (Netherlands) **C Vis**	**w/o**
4	(United States) **L Raymond** (Australia) **R Stubbs**	**6**	**6**
2	(France) A Fusai (France) N Tauziat	1	2

Final
3	(Russia) Elena Likhovtseva (Netherlands) Caroline Vis	1	**7**	3
4	(United States) **Lisa Raymond** (Australia) **Rennae Stubbs**	**6**	6	**6**
