= 1996 Faber Grand Prix – Doubles =

Doubles
- 1996 Faber Grand Prix

Final
- Champions: (United States) Meredith McGrath (Latvia) Larisa Savchenko
- Runners-up: (United States) Lori McNeil (Czech Republic) Helena Suková
- Score: 3–6, 6–3, 6–2

Details
- Draw: 16
- Seeds: 4

Events
Singles	Doubles
← 1995 ·	Faber Grand Prix	· 1997 →

Meredith McGrath and Larisa Savchenko won in the final 3–6, 6–3, 6–2 against Lori McNeil and Helena Suková.

== Seeds ==
Champion seeds are indicated in bold text while text in italics indicates the round in which those seeds were eliminated.

1. (United States) **Meredith McGrath** / (Latvia) **Larisa Savchenko (champions)**
2. (United States) Lori McNeil / (Czech Republic) Helena Suková (final)
3. (Croatia) Iva Majoli / (Czech Republic) Jana Novotná (semifinals)
4. (Netherlands) Manon Bollegraf / (Netherlands) Kristie Boogert (first round)

== Draw ==
=== Key ===
- Q = Qualifier
- WC = Wild card
- LL = Lucky loser
- Alt = Alternate
- ITF = ITF entry
- PR = Protected ranking
- SR = Special ranking
- SE = Special exempt
- JE = Junior exempt
- JR = Junior Accelerator Programme entrant
- CO = College Accelerator Programme entrant
- NG = Next Gen Accelerator Program entrant
- w/o = Walkover
- r = Retired
- d = Defaulted

First round
1	(United States) **M McGrath** (Latvia) **L Savchenko**	**6**	**7**
(Belgium) N Feber (Netherlands) C Vis	4	6
(Sweden) M Lindström (Sweden) M Strandlund	2	1
(Russia) **E Makarova** (Russia) **E Maniokova**	**6**	**6**
4	(Netherlands) M Bollegraf (Netherlands) K Boogert	**6**	2	5
Q	(Federal Republic of Yugoslavia) **T Ječmenica** (Bulgaria) **S Krivencheva**	1	**6**	**7**
(Germany) A Huber (Germany) C Porwik	4	1
(Sweden) **Å Carlsson** (Germany) **K Kschwendt**	**6**	**6**
(Czech Republic) E Melicharová (Czech Republic) H Vildová	4	2
(Belgium) **E Callens** (Belgium) **L Courtois**	**6**	**6**
(Italy) S Cecchini (Italy) L Garrone	1	2
3	(Croatia) **I Majoli** (Czech Republic) **J Novotná**	**6**	**6**
(Australia) R Stubbs (Belgium) D Van Roost	4	**7**	4
(Belgium) **S Appelmans** (Netherlands) **M Oremans**	**6**	6	**6**
(Germany) W Probst (Germany) C Singer	**6**	3	4
2	(United States) **L McNeil** (Czech Republic) **H Suková**	4	**6**	**6**

Quarterfinals
1	(United States) **M McGrath** (Latvia) **L Savchenko**	**7**	**6**
(Russia) E Makarova (Russia) E Maniokova	5	2
Q	(Federal Republic of Yugoslavia) **T Ječmenica** (Bulgaria) **S Krivencheva**	**6**	**6**
(Sweden) Å Carlsson (Germany) K Kschwendt	3	2
(Belgium) E Callens (Belgium) L Courtois	4	4
3	(Croatia) **I Majoli** (Czech Republic) **J Novotná**	**6**	**6**
(Belgium) S Appelmans (Netherlands) M Oremans	4	**6**	6
2	(United States) **L McNeil** (Czech Republic) **H Suková**	**6**	3	**7**

Semifinals
1	(United States) **M McGrath** (Latvia) **L Savchenko**	**6**	**7**
Q	(Federal Republic of Yugoslavia) T Ječmenica (Bulgaria) S Krivencheva	1	6
3	(Croatia) I Majoli (Czech Republic) J Novotná	2	6
2	(United States) **L McNeil** (Czech Republic) **H Suková**	**6**	**7**

Final
1	(United States) **Meredith McGrath** (Latvia) **Larisa Savchenko**	3	**6**	**6**
2	(United States) Lori McNeil (Czech Republic) Helena Suková	**6**	3	2
