= 2000 Faber Grand Prix – Singles =

Singles
- 2000 Faber Grand Prix

Final
- Champion: (United States) Serena Williams
- Runner-up: (Czech Republic) Denisa Chládková
- Score: 6–1, 6–1

Details
- Draw: 28
- Seeds: 8

Events
Singles	Doubles
← 1999 ·	Faber Grand Prix

Jana Novotná was the reigning champion, but did not compete this year.

Serena Williams won the title by defeating Denisa Chládková 6–1, 6–1 in the final.

== Seeds ==
The top four seeds received a bye to the second round.

1. (United States) Serena Williams (champion)
2. (France) Nathalie Tauziat (second round)
3. (France) Amélie Mauresmo (semifinals)
4. (Russia) Elena Likhovtseva (second round)
5. (Germany) Anke Huber (first round)
6. (Romania) Ruxandra Dragomir (second round)
7. (Croatia) Silvija Talaja (first round)
8. (Switzerland) Patty Schnyder (quarterfinals)

== Draw ==
=== Key ===
- Q = Qualifier
- WC = Wild card
- LL = Lucky loser
- Alt = Alternate
- SE = Special exempt
- PR = Protected ranking
- ITF = ITF entry
- JE = Junior exempt
- w/o = Walkover
- r = Retired
- d = Defaulted
- SR = Special ranking

=== Finals ===
Semifinals
1	(United States) Serena Williams	6	6^{4}	7^{7}
3	(France) Amélie Mauresmo	2	7^{7}	6^{3}
(Czech Republic) Denisa Chládková	6	6^{5}	7^{7}
(France) Anne-Gaëlle Sidot	3	7^{7}	6^{4}

Final
1	(United States) Serena Williams	6	6
(Czech Republic) Denisa Chládková	1	1

=== Top half ===
First round
(Belgium) S Appelmans	6	6
WC	(Germany) M Müller	4	2
(Spain) G León García	0	1
Q	(Canada) S Jeyaseelan	6	6
WC	(Romania) R Sandu	2	6^{1}
8	(Switzerland) P Schnyder	6	7^{7}
LL	(Slovenia) T Pisnik	7^{7}	6
(Italy) S Farina	6^{4}	3
(Czech Republic) K Hrdličková	3	0
(Israel) A Smashnova	6	6
(Slovakia) K Habšudová	3	6^{5}
6	(Romania) R Dragomir	6	7^{7}

Second round
1	(United States) S Williams	6	6
(Belgium) S Appelmans	1	3
Q	(Canada) S Jeyaseelan	5	4
8	(Switzerland) P Schnyder	7	6
3	(France) A Mauresmo
LL	(Slovenia) T Pisnik	d
(Israel) A Smashnova	7	6
6	(Romania) R Dragomir	5	2

Quarterfinals
1	(United States) S Williams	6	6
8	(Switzerland) P Schnyder	1	4
3	(France) A Mauresmo	6	6
(Israel) A Smashnova	2	1

Semifinals
1	(United States) S Williams	6	6^{4}	7^{7}
3	(France) A Mauresmo	2	7^{7}	6^{3}

=== Bottom half ===
First round
7	(Croatia) S Talaja	5	3
(Luxembourg) A Kremer	7	6
Q	(Netherlands) M Oremans	6	6
(Romania) I Spîrlea	3	3
(Czech Republic) D Chládková	6	3	6
Q	(Netherlands) A Hopmans	4	6	3
5	(Germany) A Huber	1	7^{7}	3
(Belgium) K Clijsters	6	6^{2}	6
LL	(France) A Cocheteux	2	3
(France) AG Sidot	6	6
(Belarus) N Zvereva	4	3
Q	(Netherlands) K Boogert	6	6

Second round
(Luxembourg) A Kremer	6	6
Q	(Netherlands) M Oremans	2	4
(Czech Republic) D Chládková	3	6	6
4	(Russia) E Likhovtseva	6	2	3
(Belgium) K Clijsters	7^{7}	4	4
(France) AG Sidot	6^{3}	6	6
Q	(Netherlands) K Boogert	6^{3}	7	6
2	(France) N Tauziat	7^{7}	5	3

Quarterfinals
(Luxembourg) A Kremer	2	3
(Czech Republic) D Chládková	6	6
(France) AG Sidot	6	6
Q	(Netherlands) K Boogert	4	2

Semifinals
(Czech Republic) D Chládková	6	6^{5}	7^{7}
(France) AG Sidot	3	7^{7}	6^{4}
