= 1996 Faber Grand Prix =

- Date: 19–25 February
- Edition: 4th
- Category: Tier II
- Draw: 28S / 16D
- Prize money: $450,000
- Surface: Carpet / indoor
- Location: Essen, Germany

Champions

Singles
- (Croatia) Iva Majoli

Doubles
- (United States) Meredith McGrath; (Latvia) Larisa Savchenko
← 1994 ·	Faber Grand Prix	· 1997 →

The 1996 Faber Grand Prix was a women's tennis tournament played on indoor carpet courts in Essen in Germany that was part of the Tier II category of the 1996 WTA Tour. It was the fourth edition of the tournament and was held from 19 February until 25 February 1996. First-seeded Iva Majoli won the singles title.

== Finals ==
=== Singles ===
(Croatia) Iva Majoli defeated (Czech Republic) Jana Novotná 7–5, 1–6, 7–6^{(8–6)}

- It was Majoli's 2nd and last singles title of the year and the 4th of her career.

=== Doubles ===
(United States) Meredith McGrath / (Latvia) Larisa Savchenko defeated (United States) Lori McNeil / (Czech Republic) Helena Suková 3–6, 6–3, 6–2

- It was McGrath's 1st doubles title of the year and the 23rd of her career. It was Savchenko's 1st doubles title of the year and the 54th of her career.

== Prize money ==
Event	W	F	SF	QF	Round of 16	Round of 32
Singles	$79,000	$36,000	$17,850	$9,400	$4,950	$2,600
