= 1997 Faber Grand Prix – Singles =

Singles
- 1997 Faber Grand Prix
- 1996 Champion: (Croatia) Iva Majoli

Final
- Champion: (Croatia) Iva Majoli
- Runner-up: (Czech Republic) Jana Novotná
- Score: 4–6, 7–6, 6–4

Details
- Draw: 28
- Seeds: 8

Events
Singles	Doubles
← 1996 ·	Faber Grand Prix	· 1998 →

Iva Majoli was the defending champion and won in the final 4–6, 7–6, 6–4 against Jana Novotná.

== Seeds ==
A champion seed is indicated in bold text while text in italics indicates the round in which that seed was eliminated. The top four seeds received a bye to the second round.

1. (Czech Republic) Jana Novotná (final)
2. (Germany) Anke Huber (second round)
3. (Croatia) **Iva Majoli (champion)**
4. (Slovakia) Karina Habšudová (second round)
5. (Netherlands) Brenda Schultz-McCarthy (second round)
6. (Austria) Barbara Paulus (semifinals)
7. (Belgium) Sabine Appelmans (second round)
8. (Russia) Elena Likhovtseva (quarterfinals)

== Draw ==
=== Key ===
- Q = Qualifier
- WC = Wild card
- LL = Lucky loser
- Alt = Alternate
- ITF = ITF entry
- PR = Protected ranking
- SR = Special ranking
- SE = Special exempt
- JE = Junior exempt
- JR = Junior Accelerator Programme entrant
- CO = College Accelerator Programme entrant
- NG = Next Gen Accelerator Program entrant
- w/o = Walkover
- r = Retired
- d = Defaulted

=== Final ===
Final
1	(Czech Republic) Jana Novotná	**6**	6	4
3	(Croatia) **Iva Majoli**	4	**7**	**6**

=== Section 1 ===
First round
WC	(Germany) B Rittner	**6**	3	5
(Romania) **R Dragomir**	4	**6**	**7**
(Belgium) **D Van Roost**	**7**	4	**6**
Q	(Czech Republic) D Chládková	6	**6**	3
(France) N Tauziat	**6**	6	2
8	(Russia) **E Likhovtseva**	4	**7**	**6**
(Bulgaria) **M Maleeva**	**6**	**6**
(Italy) S Farina	2	1
Q	(Czech Republic) S Kleinová	**6**	4	2
Q	(France) **S Testud**	4	**6**	**6**
(Argentina) F Labat	4	6
5	(Netherlands) **B Schultz-McCarthy**	**6**	**7**

Second round
1	(Czech Republic) **J Novotná**	**6**	**6**
(Romania) R Dragomir	2	3
(Belgium) D Van Roost	1	2
8	(Russia) **E Likhovtseva**	**6**	**6**
4	(Slovakia) K Habšudová	**6**	3	2
(Bulgaria) **M Maleeva**	0	**6**	**6**
Q	(France) **S Testud**	**6**	**6**
5	(Netherlands) B Schultz-McCarthy	4	3

Quarterfinals
1	(Czech Republic) **J Novotná**	**6**	**6**
8	(Russia) E Likhovtseva	4	2
(Bulgaria) **M Maleeva**	**6**	**6**
Q	(France) S Testud	1	4

Semifinals
1	(Czech Republic) **J Novotná**	**6**	**7**
(Bulgaria) M Maleeva	0	5

=== Section 2 ===
First round
7	(Belgium) **S Appelmans**	**6**	**6**
(Slovakia) K Studeníková	2	3
(France) **A-G Sidot**	**7**	**6**
WC	(Germany) C Singer	6	2
(Belgium) E Callens	**6**	1	4
(Indonesia) **Y Basuki**	3	**6**	**6**
6	(Austria) **B Paulus**	**6**	**6**
(United States) A Miller	0	0
(Sweden) **Å Carlsson**	3	**6**	**6**
Q	(Italy) F Perfetti	**6**	3	4
(Austria) B Schett	**6**	3	5
(Netherlands) **M Oremans**	4	**6**	**7**

Second round
7	(Belgium) S Appelmans	3	**6**	5
(France) **A-G Sidot**	**6**	4	**7**
(Indonesia) Y Basuki	5	1
3	(Croatia) **I Majoli**	**7**	**6**
6	(Austria) **B Paulus**	**6**	**7**
(Sweden) Å Carlsson	3	5
(Netherlands) **M Oremans**	**6**	5	**6**
2	(Germany) A Huber	0	**7**	4

Quarterfinals
(France) A-G Sidot	**6**	6	4
3	(Croatia) **I Majoli**	4	**7**	**6**
6	(Austria) **B Paulus**	**7**	**6**
(Netherlands) M Oremans	6	4

Semifinals
3	(Croatia) **I Majoli**	**7**	**6**
6	(Austria) B Paulus	6	4
