= 1996 Páginas Amarillas Open =

- Date: 21–25 May
- Edition: 1st
- Category: Tier II
- Draw: 28S / 14D
- Prize money: $250,000
- Surface: Clay / outdoor
- Location: Madrid, Spain

Champions

Singles
- (Czech Republic) Jana Novotná

Doubles
- (Czech Republic) Jana Novotná / (Spain) Arantxa Sánchez Vicario
WTA Madrid Open	· 1997 →

The 1996 Páginas Amarillas Open was a women's tennis tournament played on outdoor clay courts in Madrid in Spain that was part of the Tier II category of the 1996 WTA Tour. It was the inaugural edition of the tournament and was held from 21 May until 25 May 1996. Sixth-seeded Jana Novotná won the singles title.

== Finals ==
=== Singles ===
(Czech Republic) Jana Novotná defeated (Bulgaria) Magdalena Maleeva 4–6, 6–4, 6–3

- It was Novotná's 1st singles title of the year and the 12th of her career.

=== Doubles ===
(Czech Republic) Jana Novotná / (Spain) Arantxa Sánchez Vicario defeated (Belgium) Sabine Appelmans / (Netherlands) Miriam Oremans 7–6, 6–2

- It was Novotná's 4th doubles title of the year and the 59th of her career. It was Sánchez Vicario's 7th doubles title of the year and the 47th of her career.
