= 1996 Páginas Amarillas Open – Singles =

Singles
- 1996 Páginas Amarillas Open

Final
- Champion: (Czech Republic) Jana Novotná
- Runner-up: (Bulgaria) Magdalena Maleeva
- Score: 4–6, 6–4, 6–3

Details
- Draw: 28
- Seeds: 8

Events
Singles	Doubles
WTA Madrid Open	· 1997 →

Jana Novotná won in the final 4–6, 6–4, 6–3 against Magdalena Maleeva.

== Seeds ==
A champion seed is indicated in bold text while text in italics indicates the round in which that seed was eliminated. The top four seeds received a bye to the second round.

1. (United States) Monica Seles (quarterfinals)
2. (Spain) Arantxa Sánchez Vicario (semifinals)
3. (Spain) Conchita Martínez (second round)
4. (Bulgaria) Magdalena Maleeva (final)
5. (Netherlands) Brenda Schultz-McCarthy (quarterfinals)
6. (Czech Republic) **Jana Novotná (champion)**
7. (South Africa) Amanda Coetzer (quarterfinals)
8. (Romania) Irina Spîrlea (quarterfinals)

== Draw ==
=== Key ===
- Q = Qualifier
- WC = Wild card
- LL = Lucky loser
- Alt = Alternate
- ITF = ITF entry
- PR = Protected ranking
- SR = Special ranking
- SE = Special exempt
- JE = Junior exempt
- JR = Junior Accelerator Programme entrant
- CO = College Accelerator Programme entrant
- NG = Next Gen Accelerator Program entrant
- w/o = Walkover
- r = Retired
- d = Defaulted

=== Final ===
Final
6	(Czech Republic) **Jana Novotná**	4	**6**	**6**
4	(Bulgaria) Magdalena Maleeva	**6**	4	3

=== Section 1 ===
First round
(Austria) **B Schett**	6	**6**	**6**
(United States) A Frazier	**7**	3	4
(South Africa) J Kruger	**6**	0	r
(Japan) **N Sawamatsu**	0	**1**
Q	(Germany) W Probst	1	2
8	(Romania) **I Spîrlea**	**6**	**6**
(Czech Republic) **L Richterová**	**7**	**6**
(France) J Halard-Decugis	6	3
(United States) **L Raymond**	**6**	**6**
(Spain) V Ruano-Pascual	4	3
Q	(Switzerland) P Schnyder	6	4
6	(Czech Republic) **J Novotná**	**7**	**6**

Second round
1	(United States) **M Seles**	3	**7**	**6**
(Austria) B Schett	**6**	6	2
(Japan) N Sawamatsu
8	(Romania) **I Spîrlea**	**w/o**
3	(Spain) C Martínez	2	3
(Czech Republic) **L Richterová**	**6**	**6**
(United States) L Raymond	2	5
6	(Czech Republic) **J Novotná**	**6**	**7**

Quarterfinals
1	(United States) M Seles
8	(Romania) **I Spîrlea**	**w/o**
(Czech Republic) L Richterová	4	2
6	(Czech Republic) **J Novotná**	**6**	**6**

Semifinals
8	(Romania) I Spîrlea
6	(Czech Republic) **J Novotná**	**w/o**

=== Section 2 ===
First round
5	(Netherlands) **B Schultz-McCarthy**	**6**	**7**
(Netherlands) M Oremans	4	5
(Belgium) S Appelmans	3	6
Q	(Czech Republic) **R Bobková**	**6**	**7**
(Japan) A Sugiyama	2	6
(Spain) **M Sánchez Lorenzo**	**6**	**7**
7	(South Africa) **A Coetzer**	**6**	**6**
Q	(Poland) K Nowak	0	1
(Russia) **E Likhovtseva**	**6**	6	**6**
(Italy) R Grande	2	**7**	0
(Argentina) **F Labat**	**6**	**6**
WC	(Spain) N Serra	1	1

Second round
5	(Netherlands) **B Schultz-McCarthy**	**6**	**6**
Q	(Czech Republic) R Bobková	4	3
(Spain) M Sánchez Lorenzo	4	1
4	(Bulgaria) **M Maleeva**	**6**	**6**
7	(South Africa) **A Coetzer**	**6**	**6**
(Russia) E Likhovtseva	4	4
(Argentina) F Labat	5	1
WC/2	(Spain) **A Sánchez Vicario**	**7**	**6**

Quarterfinals
5	(Netherlands) B Schultz-McCarthy	2	3
4	(Bulgaria) **M Maleeva**	**6**	**6**
7	(South Africa) A Coetzer	2	3
WC/2	(Spain) **A Sánchez Vicario**	**6**	**6**

Semifinals
4	(Bulgaria) **M Maleeva**	**6**	**7**
WC/2	(Spain) A Sánchez Vicario	4	5
