= 1997 Páginas Amarillas Open =

- Date: 19–24 May
- Edition: 2nd
- Category: Tier III
- Draw: 30S / 15D
- Prize money: $175,000
- Surface: Clay / outdoor
- Location: Madrid, Spain

Champions

Singles
- (Czech Republic) Jana Novotná

Doubles
- (United States) Mary Joe Fernández / (Spain) Arantxa Sánchez Vicario
← 1996 ·	WTA Madrid Open	· 1998 →

The 1997 Páginas Amarillas Open was a women's tennis tournament played on outdoor clay courts in Madrid in Spain that was part of the Tier III category of the 1997 WTA Tour. It was the second edition of the tournament and was held from 19 May through 24 May 1997. Second-seeded Jana Novotná won the singles title.

== Finals ==
=== Singles ===
(Czech Republic) Jana Novotná defeated (United States) Monica Seles 7–5, 6–1

- It was Novotná's 1st singles title of the year and the 16th of her career.

=== Doubles ===
(United States) Mary Joe Fernández / (Spain) Arantxa Sánchez Vicario defeated (Argentina) Inés Gorrochategui / (Romania) Irina Spîrlea 6–3, 6–2

- It was Fernández's 2nd and last doubles title of the year and the 17th and last of her career. It was Sánchez Vicario's 3rd doubles title of the year and the 52nd of her career.
