= 1999 Faber Grand Prix – Doubles =

Doubles
- 1999 Faber Grand Prix

Final
- Champions: (United States) Serena Williams (United States) Venus Williams
- Runners-up: (France) Alexandra Fusai (France) Nathalie Tauziat
- Score: 5–7, 6–2, 6–2

Events
| Singles | Doubles |
| ← 1998 · | Faber Grand Prix | · 2000 → |

The 1999 Faber Grand Prix doubles was the doubles event of the seventh edition of the Faber Grand Prix; a WTA Tier II tournament held in Hannover, Germany. Lisa Raymond and Rennae Stubbs were the defending champions but did not compete that year.

Serena Williams and Venus Williams won in the final 5–7, 6–2, 6–2 against Alexandra Fusai and Nathalie Tauziat.

== Seeds ==
1. (France) Alexandra Fusai / (France) Nathalie Tauziat (final)
2. (Russia) Elena Likhovtseva / (Japan) Ai Sugiyama (semifinals)
3. (Latvia) Larisa Neiland / (Ukraine) Elena Tatarkova (quarterfinals)
4. (Netherlands) Manon Bollegraf / (Netherlands) Caroline Vis (quarterfinals)

== Draw ==
=== Key ===
- Q = Qualifier
- WC = Wild card
- LL = Lucky loser
- Alt = Alternate
- ITF = ITF entry
- PR = Protected ranking
- SR = Special ranking
- SE = Special exempt
- JE = Junior exempt
- JR = Junior Accelerator Programme entrant
- CO = College Accelerator Programme entrant
- NG = Next Gen Accelerator Program entrant
- w/o = Walkover
- r = Retired
- d = Defaulted

First round
1 | (France) A Fusai (France) N Tauziat | 6 | 6^{5} | 7
(Spain) V Ruano Pascual (Germany) C Singer | 1 | 7^{7} | 5
(Sweden) Å Carlsson (France) É Loit | 6 | 6
(Romania) C Cristea (Romania) R Dragomir | 3 | 4
3 | (Latvia) L Neiland (Ukraine) E Tatarkova | w/o
(Italy) S Farina (Slovakia) K Habšudová
(Germany) A Huber (France) S Testud | 1 | 2
(Czech Republic) J Novotná (Germany) B Rittner | 6 | 6
(United States) S Williams (United States) V Williams | 6 | 6
(France) A-G Sidot (Germany) E Wagner | 1 | 1
(Austria) B Schett (Switzerland) P Schnyder | 1 | 4
4 | (Netherlands) M Bollegraf (Netherlands) C Vis | 6 | 6
WC | (United States) J Capriati (Germany) S Graf | 6 | 6
(Belgium) S Appelmans (Netherlands) M Oremans | 4 | 4
(Italy) L Golarsa (Ukraine) O Lugina | 6^{6} | 0
2 | (Russia) E Likhovtseva (Japan) A Sugiyama | 7^{8} | 6

Quarterfinals
1 | (France) A Fusai (France) N Tauziat | 6 | 6
(Sweden) Å Carlsson (France) É Loit | 4 | 2
3 | (Latvia) L Neiland (Ukraine) E Tatarkova | 1 | 6^{4}
(Czech Republic) J Novotná (Germany) B Rittner | 6 | 7^{7}
(United States) S Williams (United States) V Williams | 6 | 6
4 | (Netherlands) M Bollegraf (Netherlands) C Vis | 1 | 4
WC | (United States) J Capriati (Germany) S Graf
2 | (Russia) E Likhovtseva (Japan) A Sugiyama | w/o

Semifinals
1 | (France) A Fusai (France) N Tauziat | 3 | 6 | 6
(Czech Republic) J Novotná (Germany) B Rittner | 6 | 4 | 3
(United States) S Williams (United States) V Williams | 6 | 7^{10}
2 | (Russia) E Likhovtseva (Japan) A Sugiyama | 2 | 6^{8}

Final
1 | (France) A Fusai (France) N Tauziat | 7 | 2 | 2
(United States) S Williams (United States) V Williams | 5 | 6 | 6
