= 1998 Faber Grand Prix – Singles =

Singles
- 1998 Faber Grand Prix
- 1997 Champion: (Croatia) Iva Majoli

Final
- Champion: (Switzerland) Patty Schnyder
- Runner-up: (Czech Republic) Jana Novotná
- Score: 6–0, 2–6, 7–5

Events
Singles	Doubles
← 1997 ·	Faber Grand Prix	· 1999 →

Iva Majoli was the defending champion but lost in the second round to Patty Schnyder.

Schnyder won in the final 6–0, 2–6, 7–5 against Jana Novotná.

== Seeds ==
A champion seed is indicated in bold text while text in italics indicates the round in which that seed was eliminated. The top four seeds received a bye to the second round.

1. (Czech Republic) Jana Novotná (final)
2. (Germany) Steffi Graf (quarterfinals)
3. (Croatia) Iva Majoli (second round)
4. n/a
5. (Romania) Irina Spîrlea (first round)
6. (Germany) Anke Huber (quarterfinals)
7. (France) Nathalie Tauziat (quarterfinals)
8. (United States) Lisa Raymond (quarterfinals)

== Draw ==
=== Key ===
- Q = Qualifier
- WC = Wild card
- LL = Lucky loser
- Alt = Alternate
- SE = Special exempt
- PR = Protected ranking
- ITF = ITF entry
- JE = Junior exempt
- w/o = Walkover
- r = Retired
- d = Defaulted
- SR = Special ranking

=== Final ===
Final
1	(Czech Republic) Jana Novotná	0	**6**	5
	(Switzerland) **Patty Schnyder**	**6**	2	**7**

=== Section 1 ===
First round
Q	(France) A Cocheteux	2	0
(Belgium) **D Van Roost**	**6**	**6**
(Romania) R Dragomir	1	**7**	6
Q	(Czech Republic) **A Gerši**	**6**	6	**7**
Q	(France) A Fusai	6	2
8	(United States) **L Raymond**	**7**	**6**
(Russia) **A Kournikova**	**6**	**6**
(Italy) S Farina	4	3
(Argentina) F Labat	5	1
(Austria) **B Schett**	**7**	**6**
(Russia) E Likhovtseva	**7**	2	4
6	(Germany) **A Huber**	6	**6**	**6**

Second round
1	(Czech Republic) **J Novotná**	4	**6**	**6**
(Belgium) D Van Roost	**6**	4	3
Q	(Czech Republic) A Gerši	1	0
8	(United States) **L Raymond**	**6**	**6**
LL	(Germany) W Probst	3	1
(Russia) **A Kournikova**	**6**	**6**
(Austria) B Schett	4	2
6	(Germany) **A Huber**	**6**	**6**

Quarterfinals
1	(Czech Republic) **J Novotná**	**6**	**7**
8	(United States) L Raymond	1	5
(Russia) **A Kournikova**	**6**	3	**6**
6	(Germany) A Huber	4	**6**	4

Semifinals
1	(Czech Republic) **J Novotná**	**6**	**6**
(Russia) A Kournikova	3	3

=== Section 2 ===
First round
7	(France) **N Tauziat**	**6**	**6**
(Poland) M Grzybowska	2	1
(Slovakia) **K Habšudová**	**6**	**7**
WC	(Germany) B Rittner	4	6
(France) A-G Sidot	0	2
(Switzerland) **P Schnyder**	**6**	**6**
5	(Romania) I Spîrlea	1	r
(Belgium) **S Appelmans**	**4**
Q	(Germany) M Babel	4	2
(Bulgaria) **M Maleeva**	**6**	**6**
WC	(Germany) **A Glass**	2	**6**	**6**
(Austria) B Paulus	**6**	3	0

Second round
7	(France) **N Tauziat**	**6**	**6**
(Slovakia) K Habšudová	4	4
(Switzerland) **P Schnyder**	**6**	**6**
3	(Croatia) I Majoli	1	3
(Belgium) **S Appelmans**	**7**	**6**
(Bulgaria) M Maleeva	5	3
WC	(Germany) A Glass	4	2
2	(Germany) **S Graf**	**6**	**6**

Quarterfinals
7	(France) N Tauziat	4	3
(Switzerland) **P Schnyder**	**6**	**6**
(Belgium) **S Appelmans**	**6**	**7**
2	(Germany) S Graf	3	6

Semifinals
(Switzerland) **P Schnyder**	**6**	**6**
(Belgium) S Appelmans	3	3
