= 1997 Páginas Amarillas Open – Singles =

Singles
- 1997 Páginas Amarillas Open
- 1996 Champion: (Czech Republic) Jana Novotná

Final
- Champion: (Czech Republic) Jana Novotná
- Runner-up: (United States) Monica Seles
- Score: 7–5, 6–1

Details
- Draw: 30
- Seeds: 8

Events
Singles	Doubles
← 1996 ·	WTA Madrid Open	· 1998 →

Jana Novotná was the defending champion and won in the final 7–5, 6–1 against Monica Seles.

== Seeds ==
A champion seed is indicated in bold text while text in italics indicates the round in which that seed was eliminated. The top two seeds received a bye to the second round.

1. (United States) Monica Seles (final)
2. (Czech Republic) **Jana Novotná (champion)**
3. (Spain) Arantxa Sánchez Vicario (semifinals)
4. (Romania) Irina Spîrlea (quarterfinals)
5. (United States) Mary Joe Fernández (first round)
6. (United States) Kimberly Po (first round)
7. (United States) Lisa Raymond (first round)
8. (United States) Amy Frazier (second round)

== Draw ==
=== Key ===
- Q = Qualifier
- WC = Wild card
- LL = Lucky loser
- Alt = Alternate
- ITF = ITF entry
- PR = Protected ranking
- SR = Special ranking
- SE = Special exempt
- JE = Junior exempt
- JR = Junior Accelerator Programme entrant
- CO = College Accelerator Programme entrant
- NG = Next Gen Accelerator Program entrant
- w/o = Walkover
- r = Retired
- d = Defaulted

=== Final ===
Final
1	(United States) Monica Seles	5	1
2	(Czech Republic) **Jana Novotná**	**7**	**6**

=== Section 1 ===
First round
(Spain) **M Sánchez Lorenzo**	**6**	**6**
Q	(Germany) V Martinek	1	0
(United States) L Wild	**6**	6	1
(Spain) **V Ruano-Pascual**	4	**7**	**6**
WC	(Spain) L Pena	4	3
8	(United States) **A Frazier**	**6**	**6**
4	(Romania) **I Spîrlea**	**6**	**6**
(Australia) A Ellwood	3	4
(Italy) R Grande	5	3
Q	(Italy) **S Cecchini**	**7**	**6**
Q	(Czech Republic) L Němečková	2	1
(Argentina) **F Labat**	**6**	**6**
(Austria) **M Maruska**	3	**6**	**6**
6	(United States) K Po	**6**	2	4

Second round
1	(United States) **M Seles**	**6**	**6**
(Spain) M Sánchez Lorenzo	0	1
(Spain) **V Ruano-Pascual**	**6**	**6**
8	(United States) A Frazier	0	0
4	(Romania) **I Spîrlea**	**6**	**6**
Q	(Italy) S Cecchini	1	2
(Argentina) **F Labat**	**6**	**6**
(Austria) M Maruska	2	2

Quarterfinals
1	(United States) **M Seles**	**6**	**6**
(Spain) V Ruano-Pascual	2	1
4	(Romania) I Spîrlea	2	5
(Argentina) **F Labat**	**6**	**7**

Semifinals
1	(United States) **M Seles**	6	**6**	**6**
(Argentina) F Labat	**7**	1	2

=== Section 2 ===
First round
7	(United States) L Raymond	1	2
(Switzerland) **P Schnyder**	**6**	**6**
(United States) **A Grossman**	**7**	**7**
(Italy) F Lubiani	5	5
(Romania) **C Cristea**	**7**	**6**
(United States) T Whitlinger-Jones	6	4
(Spain) M Serna	2	1
3	(Spain) **A Sánchez Vicario**	**6**	**6**
5	(United States) M J Fernández	2	3
(Argentina) **I Gorrochategui**	**6**	**6**
(Japan) R Hiraki	2	4
Q	(Spain) **G León García**	**6**	**6**
WC	(Spain) E Salvador	0	0
(Sweden) **Å Carlsson**	**6**	**6**

Second round
(Switzerland) P Schnyder	6	**6**	5
(United States) **A Grossman**	**7**	4	**7**
(Romania) C Cristea	**6**	0	0
3	(Spain) **A Sánchez Vicario**	4	**6**	**6**
(Argentina) I Gorrochategui	3	**6**	2
Q	(Spain) **G León García**	**6**	3	**6**
(Sweden) Å Carlsson	2	2
2	(Czech Republic) **J Novotná**	**6**	**6**

Quarterfinals
(United States) A Grossman	1	1
3	(Spain) **A Sánchez Vicario**	**6**	**6**
Q	(Spain) G León García	3	4
2	(Czech Republic) **J Novotná**	**6**	**6**

Semifinals
3	(Spain) A Sánchez Vicario	4	4
2	(Czech Republic) **J Novotná**	**6**	**6**
