= 1994 Nokia Grand Prix =

- Date: 24–30 October
- Edition: 3rd
- Category: Tier II
- Draw: 32S / 16D
- Prize money: $400,000
- Surface: Hard / indoor
- Location: Essen, Germany
- Venue: Grugahalle Essen

Champions

Singles
- (Czech Republic) Jana Novotná

Doubles
- (Sweden) Maria Lindström / (Sweden) Maria Strandlund
← 1993 ·	Faber Grand Prix	· 1996 →

The 1994 Nokia Grand Prix was a women's tennis tournament played on indoor hardcourts at the Grugahalle in Essen in Germany that was part of Tier II of the 1994 WTA Tour. It was the third edition of the tournament and was held from 24 October until 30 October 1994. Second-seeded Jana Novotná won the singles title and earned $80,000 first-prize money.

== Finals ==
=== Singles ===
(Czech Republic) Jana Novotná defeated (Croatia) Iva Majoli 6–2, 6–4

- It was Novotná's 3rd and last singles title of the year and the 10th of her career.

=== Doubles ===
(Sweden) Maria Lindström / (Sweden) Maria Strandlund defeated (Russia) Eugenia Maniokova / (Czech Republic) Helena Suková 6–2, 6–1

- It was Lindström's only doubles title of the year and the 2nd and last of her career. It was Strandlund's only doubles title of her career.

== Prize money ==
Event	W	F	SF	QF	Round of 16	Round of 32
Singles	$80,000	$36,000	$18,000	$9,000	$4,600	$2,400
