= 1999 Faber Grand Prix – Singles =

Singles
- 1999 Faber Grand Prix

Final
- Champion: (Czech Republic) Jana Novotná
- Runner-up: (United States) Venus Williams
- Score: 6–4, 6–4

Events
Singles	Doubles
← 1998 ·	Faber Grand Prix	· 2000 →

The 1999 Faber Grand Prix singles was the singles event of the seventh edition of the Faber Grand Prix; a WTA Tier II tournament held in Hanover, Germany. Patty Schnyder was the defending champion but lost in the second round to Elena Likhovtseva.

Jana Novotná won in the final 6–4, 6–4 against Venus Williams. This was her first win at the Faber Grand Prix after having lost in the past three finals.

== Seeds ==
The top four seeds received a bye to the second round.

1. (Czech Republic) Jana Novotná (champion)
2. (United States) Venus Williams (final)
3. (Germany) Steffi Graf (semifinals)
4. (Switzerland) Patty Schnyder (second round)
5. (France) Nathalie Tauziat (second round)
6. (Belgium) Dominique Van Roost (withdrew)
7. (France) Sandrine Testud (quarterfinals)
8. (Austria) Barbara Schett (quarterfinals)
9. (Italy) Silvia Farina (second round)

== Draw ==
=== Key ===
- Q = Qualifier
- WC = Wild card
- LL = Lucky loser
- Alt = Alternate
- SE = Special exempt
- PR = Protected ranking
- ITF = ITF entry
- JE = Junior exempt
- w/o = Walkover
- r = Retired
- d = Defaulted
- SR = Special ranking

=== Finals ===
Semifinals
1	(Czech Republic) Jana Novotná	7^{7}	6
(Russia) Elena Likhovtseva	6^{4}	4
3	(Germany) Steffi Graf	3	6	3
2	(United States) Venus Williams	6	3	6

Final
1	(Czech Republic) Jana Novotná	6	6
2	(United States) Venus Williams	4	4

=== Top half ===
First round
(Romania) R Dragomir	6	6
(France) S Pitkowski	3	2
(Austria) S Plischke	5	6^{4}
(Germany) A Huber	7	7^{7}
WC	(Germany) A Glass	6^{6}	1
7	(France) S Testud	7^{8}	6
(Slovakia) H Nagyová	2	2	r
(Russia) E Likhovtseva	6	4
Q	(France) É Loit	0	0
LL	(Netherlands) M Oremans	6	6
(France) N Dechy	3	7^{10}	3
5	(France) N Tauziat	6	6^{8}	6

Second round
1	(Czech Republic) J Novotná	6	6
(Romania) R Dragomir	3	3
(Germany) A Huber	3	3
7	(France) S Testud	6	6
4	(Switzerland) P Schnyder	5	3
(Russia) E Likhovtseva	7	6
LL	(Netherlands) M Oremans	6	6
5	(France) N Tauziat	4	4

Quarterfinals
1	(Czech Republic) J Novotná	6	6
7	(France) S Testud	1	4
(Russia) E Likhovtseva	6	6
LL	(Netherlands) M Oremans	2	2

Semifinals
1	(Czech Republic) J Novotná	7^{7}	6
(Russia) E Likhovtseva	6^{4}	4

=== Bottom half ===
First round
8	(Austria) B Schett	6	6
WC	(United States) J Capriati	4	2
(France) A Fusai	3	2
(Spain) V Ruano Pascual	6	6
WC	(Belgium) S Appelmans	3	4
Q	(France) A-G Sidot	6	6
9	(Italy) S Farina	6	6
Q	(Slovakia) K Habšudová	3	1
Q	(Germany) B Rittner	6	5	6
(Spain) M Serna	4	7	4
(Croatia) I Majoli	6	5	3
(Japan) A Sugiyama	2	7	6

Second round
8	(Austria) B Schett	7	6
(Spain) V Ruano Pascual	5	2
Q	(France) A-G Sidot	1	3
3	(Germany) S Graf	6	6
9	(Italy) S Farina	2	r
Q	(Germany) B Rittner	6
(Japan) A Sugiyama	4	5
2	(United States) V Williams	6	7

Quarterfinals
8	(Austria) B Schett	3	2
3	(Germany) S Graf	6	6
Q	(Germany) B Rittner	2	1
2	(United States) V Williams	6	6

Semifinals
3	(Germany) S Graf	3	6	3
2	(United States) V Williams	6	3	6

== Qualifying ==
=== Seeds ===
1. (France) Émilie Loit (qualifier)
2. (Slovakia) Karina Habšudová (qualifier)
3. (Netherlands) Miriam Oremans (qualifying competition, lucky loser)
4. (Romania) Cătălina Cristea (first round)
5. (France) Anne-Gaëlle Sidot (qualifier)
6. (Venezuela) María Vento (qualifying competition)
7. (Germany) Barbara Rittner (qualifier)
8. (Belarus) Olga Barabanschikova (qualifying competition, withdrew)

=== Qualifiers ===
1. (France) Émilie Loit
2. (Germany) Barbara Rittner
3. (France) Anne-Gaëlle Sidot
4. (Slovakia) Karina Habšudová

=== Lucky loser ===
1. (Netherlands) Miriam Oremans

== Qualifying draw ==
=== Key ===
- Q = Qualifier
- WC = Wild card
- LL = Lucky loser
- Alt = Alternate
- SE = Special exempt
- PR = Protected ranking
- ITF = ITF entry
- JE = Junior exempt
- w/o = Walkover
- r = Retired
- d = Defaulted
- SR = Special ranking

=== First qualifier ===
First round
1	(France) Émilie Loit	6	6
(Italy) Flora Perfetti	3	4
(Belgium) Laurence Courtois	6	7
(Germany) Elena Wagner	1	5
WC	(Germany) Jasmin Wöhr	6	6
(Germany) Adriana Barna	2	4
WC	(Germany) Sandra Klösel	2	4
6	(Venezuela) María Vento	6	6

Second round
1	(France) Émilie Loit	7^{7}	0	6
(Belgium) Laurence Courtois	6^{4}	6	3
WC	(Germany) Jasmin Wöhr	2	2
6	(Venezuela) María Vento	6	6

Qualifying competition
1	(France) Émilie Loit	6	6
6	(Venezuela) María Vento	4	2

=== Second qualifier ===
First round
3	(Netherlands) Miriam Oremans	7	6
(Germany) Petra Begerow	5	4
(France) Lea Ghirardi	6^{2}	7^{7}	6
(Italy) Laura Golarsa	7^{7}	6^{5}	2
(Federal Republic of Yugoslavia) Sandra Naćuk	3	7	6
(Russia) Eugenia Kulikovskaya	6	5	2
(France) Laurence Andretto	4	6^{4}
7	(Germany) Barbara Rittner	6	7^{7}

Second round
3	(Netherlands) Miriam Oremans	6	6
(France) Lea Ghirardi	4	3
(Federal Republic of Yugoslavia) Sandra Naćuk	6^{0}	6^{0}
7	(Germany) Barbara Rittner	7^{7}	7^{7}

Qualifying competition
3	(Netherlands) Miriam Oremans	4	2
7	(Germany) Barbara Rittner	6	6

=== Third qualifier ===
First round
5	(France) Anne-Gaëlle Sidot	6	6
(Czech Republic) Adriana Gerši	3	4
(Austria) Sandra Dopfer	6^{4}	6	0
WC	(Germany) Stephanie Gehrlein	7^{7}	2	6
(Germany) Miriam Schnitzer	6	6
(Ukraine) Olga Lugina	2	0
(Canada) Maureen Drake	5	6	6
4	(Romania) Cătălina Cristea	7	3	4

Second round
5	(France) Anne-Gaëlle Sidot	6	6
WC	(Germany) Stephanie Gehrlein	2	0
(Germany) Miriam Schnitzer	4	3
(Canada) Maureen Drake	6	6

Qualifying competition
5	(France) Anne-Gaëlle Sidot	6	6
(Canada) Maureen Drake	3	2

=== Fourth qualifier ===
First round
8	(Belarus) Olga Barabanschikova	6	6
WC	(Germany) Martina Müller	4	4
(Latvia) Larisa Neiland	4	6	2
(Sweden) Åsa Carlsson	6	3	6
(Germany) Anca Barna	6^{1}	6	6
(Germany) Julia Abe	7^{7}	1	2
(Czech Republic) Denisa Chládková	6^{5}	0
2	(Slovakia) Karina Habšudová	7^{7}	6

Second round
8	(Belarus) Olga Barabanschikova	7	2	6
(Sweden) Åsa Carlsson	5	6	3
(Germany) Anca Barna	0	1
2	(Slovakia) Karina Habšudová	6	6

Qualifying competition
8	(Belarus) Olga Barabanschikova	w/o
2	(Slovakia) Karina Habšudová
