= 1996 Faber Grand Prix – Singles =

Singles
- 1996 Faber Grand Prix

Final
- Champion: (Croatia) Iva Majoli
- Runner-up: (Czech Republic) Jana Novotná
- Score: 7–5, 1–6, 7–6^{(8–6)}

Details
- Draw: 28 (2WC/4Q/5LL)
- Seeds: 8

Events
| Singles | Doubles |
- Faber Grand Prix

In a rematch of the previous edition final, Iva Majoli won in the final 7–5, 1–6, 7–6^{(8–6)} against Jana Novotná.

== Seeds ==
A champion seed is indicated in bold text while text in italics indicates the round in which that seed was eliminated. The top four seeds received a bye to the second round.

1. (Croatia) **Iva Majoli (champion)**
2. (Germany) Anke Huber (semifinals)
3. (France) ~~Mary Pierce~~ (withdrew)
4. (Czech Republic) Jana Novotná (final)
5. (Czech Republic) Helena Suková (second round)
6. (Belgium) Sabine Appelmans (second round)
7. (Netherlands) Kristie Boogert (first round)
8. (France) ~~Julie Halard-Decugis~~ (withdrew)

== Draw ==
Key

- Q = Qualifier
- WC = Wild card
- LL = Lucky loser
- Alt = Alternate
- ITF = ITF entry
- PR = Protected ranking
- SR = Special ranking
- SE = Special exempt
- JE = Junior exempt
- JR = Junior Accelerator Programme entrant
- CO = College Accelerator Programme entrant
- NG = Next Gen Accelerator Program entrant
- w/o = Walkover
- r = Retired
- d = Defaulted

=== Final ===
| Final |
| 1 | (Croatia) **Iva Majoli** | **7** | 1 | **7^{8}** |
| 4 | (Czech Republic) Jana Novotná | 5 | **6** | 6^{6} |

=== Section 1 ===
First round
(Russia) **E Makarova** | **6** | **6**
LL | (Switzerland) P Schnyder | 1 | 1
(Austria) B Reinstadler | **6** | 3 | 0
WC | (Germany) **K Kschwendt** | 4 | **6** | **6**
Q | (Belgium) **E Callens** | 4 | **6** | **6**
LL | (Austria) M Schnell | **6** | 4 | 1
Q | (Australia) **R Stubbs** | **6** | **6**
(Poland) K Nowak | 4 | 2
(Germany) C Singer | **7** | 1 | 0
(Sweden) **Å Carlsson** | 6 | **6** | **6**
(Belgium) L Courtois | **7^{8}** | 3 | 1
5 | (Czech Republic) **H Suková** | 6^{6} | **6** | **6**

Second round
1 | (Croatia) **I Majoli** | **6** | **6**
(Russia) E Makarova | 4 | 2
WC | (Germany) K Kschwendt | 2 | 4
Q | (Belgium) **E Callens** | **6** | **6**
LL | (Germany) C Porwik | 2 | **7** | 2
Q | (Australia) **R Stubbs** | **6** | 5 | **6**
(Sweden) **Å Carlsson** | **6** | 4 | **6**
5 | (Czech Republic) H Suková | 4 | **6** | 2

Quarterfinals
1 | (Croatia) **I Majoli** | **7** | **6**
Q | (Belgium) E Callens | 5 | 4
Q | (Australia) R Stubbs | 6^{3} | 2
(Sweden) **Å Carlsson** | **7^{7}** | **6**

Semifinals
1 | (Croatia) **I Majoli** | **6** | **6**
(Sweden) Å Carlsson | 3 | 2

=== Section 2 ===
First round
7 | (Netherlands) K Boogert | 1 | 2
WC | (United States) **J Capriati** | **6** | **6**
(Slovakia) K Habšudová | **6** | 3 | 4
LL | (Austria) **B Schett** | 4 | **6** | **6**
LL | (Sweden) **M Strandlund** | **6** | **7^{7}**
Q | (Federal Republic of Yugoslavia) T Ječmenica | 4 | 6^{3}
6 | (Belgium) **S Appelmans** | **6** | **6**
(United States) L McNeil | 2 | 3
Q | (Germany) W Probst | 1 | 4
(Germany) **B Rittner** | **6** | **6**
(Belgium) D Van Roost | 2 | 2
(Netherlands) **M Oremans** | **6** | **6**

Second round
WC | (United States) **J Capriati** | **7^{8}** | **6**
LL | (Austria) B Schett | 6^{6} | 1
LL | (Sweden) M Strandlund | **6** | 4 | 1
4 | (Czech Republic) **J Novotná** | 0 | **6** | **6**
6 | (Belgium) S Appelmans | 4 | 4
(Germany) **B Rittner** | **6** | **6**
(Netherlands) M Oremans | 4 | **7^{8}** | 4
2 | (Germany) **A Huber** | **6** | 6^{6} | **6**

Quarterfinals
WC | (United States) J Capriati | 6^{6} | **6** | 3
4 | (Czech Republic) **J Novotná** | **7^{8}** | 2 | **6**
(Germany) B Rittner | 4 | 5
2 | (Germany) **A Huber** | **6** | **7**

Semifinals
4 | (Czech Republic) **J Novotná** | **6** | **6**
2 | (Germany) A Huber | 4 | 4
