= Noelia Serra =

Dominican-Spanish tennis player

- Full name: Noelia Serra-Djamdjean
- Country (sports): Dominican Republic; Spain
- Born: 9 September 1977 (age 47)
- Prize money: $29,180

Singles
- Career record: 100–69
- Career titles: 3 ITF
- Highest ranking: No. 236 (13 May 1996)

Doubles
- Career record: 28–50
- Career titles: 2 ITF
- Highest ranking: No. 242 (6 November 1995)

Noelia Serra-Djamdjean (born 9 September 1977) is a Dominican-Spanish former professional tennis player.

Before changing allegiances to Spain, Serra won three medals for the Dominican Republic at the 1993 Central American and Caribbean Games in Ponce, Puerto Rico. She and Joelle Schad were gold medalists in the team event and also partnered together to win a silver medal in the doubles. In the singles event, Serra claimed a bronze medal.

Serra reached a career best singles ranking of 236 in the world and won three singles titles on the ITF Women's Circuit. Her only WTA Tour main-draw appearance came as a local wildcard entrant at the 1996 Madrid Open, where she was beaten in the first round by Argentina's Florencia Labat.

== ITF finals ==
=== Singles: 5 (3–2) ===
Outcome	No.	Date	Tournament	Surface	Opponent	Score
Winner	1.	4 May 1997	ITF Balaguer, Spain	Clay	(Australia) Catherine Barclay	3–6, 6–3, 6–3
Runner-up	1.	17 August 1997	ITF Koksijde, Belgium	Clay	(Belgium) Justine Henin	3–6, 6–7^{(4)}
Runner-up	2.	12 October 1997	ITF Girona, Spain	Clay	(Spain) Elena Salvador	3–6, 2–6
Winner	2.	30 November 1997	ITF Mallorca, Spain	Clay	(Austria) Melanie Schnell	6–4, 6–1
Winner	3.	19 April 1998	ITF Galatina, Italy	Clay	(Argentina) Romina Ottoboni	6–2, 4–6, 6–2

=== Doubles: 3 (2–1) ===
Outcome	No.	Date	Tournament	Surface	Partner	Opponents	Score
Winner	1.	13 November 1994	ITF Santo Domingo, Dominican Republic	Clay	(Dominican Republic) Joelle Schad	(Chile) Bárbara Castro (Chile) María-Alejandra Quezada	5–1 ret.
Runner-up	1.	5 October 1997	ITF Lerida, Spain	Clay	(Netherlands) Carlijn Buis	(Spain) Lourdes Domínguez Lino (Spain) Nuria Montero	7–6^{(1)}, 2–6, 1–6
Winner	2.	19 April 1998	ITF Galatina, Italy	Clay	(Spain) Rosa María Andrés Rodríguez	(Slovakia) Silvia Uríčková (Netherlands) Debby Haak	6–4, 6–1
