= 1992 Nokia Grand Prix =

- Date: 3–9 February
- Edition: 1st
- Category: Tier II
- Draw: 32S / 16D
- Prize money: $350,000
- Surface: Carpet / indoor
- Location: Essen, Germany
- Venue: Grugahalle Essen

Champions

Singles
- (Socialist Federal Republic of Yugoslavia) Monica Seles

Doubles
- (Bulgaria) Katerina Maleeva / (Germany) Barbara Rittner
Faber Grand Prix	· 1993 →

The 1992 Nokia Grand Prix was a women's tennis tournament played on indoor carpet courts at the Grugahalle in Essen in Germany that was part of Tier II of the 1992 WTA Tour. It was the inaugural edition of the tournament and was held from 3 February until 9 February 1992. First-seeded Monica Seles won the singles title and earned $70,000 first-prize money.

== Finals ==
=== Singles ===
(Socialist Federal Republic of Yugoslavia) Monica Seles defeated (United States) Mary Joe Fernández 6–0, 6–3

- It was Seles' 2nd singles title of the year and the 22nd of her career.

=== Doubles ===
(Bulgaria) Katerina Maleeva / (Germany) Barbara Rittner defeated (Belgium) Sabine Appelmans / (Germany) Claudia Porwik 7–5, 6–3

- It was Maleeva's only doubles title of the year and the 2nd and last of her career. It was Rittner's only doubles title of the year and the 1st of her career.

== Prize money ==
Event	W	F	SF	QF	Round of 16	Round of 32
Singles	$70,000	$31,500	$15,950	$8,400	$4,450	$2,300
