= Elena Salvador =

Spanish tennis player (born 1979)

- Full name: Elena Salvador Reja
- Country (sports): Spain
- Born: 15 May 1979 (age 46); Madrid, Spain
- Plays: Right-handed
- Prize money: $30,507

Singles
- Career titles: 2 ITF
- Highest ranking: No. 210 (6 April 1998)

Doubles
- Career titles: 2 ITF
- Highest ranking: No. 228 (27 July 1998)

Elena Salvador Reja (born 15 May 1979) is a Spanish former professional tennis player.

Born in Madrid, Salvador was a right-handed player who reached a career best singles ranking of 210 in the world.

Salvador made all of her WTA Tour main draw appearances in her home tournament, the Madrid Open. She received a wildcard for the singles at the 1997 Madrid Open and played doubles in three further editions.

== ITF finals ==
$25,000 tournaments
$10,000 tournaments

=== Singles: 4 (2–2) ===
| Outcome | No. | Date | Tournament | Surface | Opponent | Score |
|---|---|---|---|---|---|---|
| Winner | 1. | 15 April 1996 | Elvas, Portugal | Hard | (Sweden) Kristina Triska | 6–0, 4–6, 6–4 |
| Runner-up | 1. | 6 May 1996 | Santander, Spain | Clay | (France) Laurence Andretto | 2–6, 6–4, 6–7 |
| Winner | 2. | 6 October 1997 | Girona, Spain | Clay | (Spain) Noelia Serra | 6–3, 6–2 |
| Runner-up | 2. | 26 January 1998 | Ourense, Spain | Hard | (Netherlands) Lotty Seelen | 2–6, 6–7^{(7)} |

=== Doubles: 3 (2–1) ===
| Outcome | No. | Date | Tournament | Surface | Partner | Opponents | Score |
|---|---|---|---|---|---|---|---|
| Runner-up | 1. | 4 August 1997 | Carthage, Tunisia | Clay | (Spain) Eva Bes | (Spain) Alicia Ortuño (Slovakia) Zuzana Váleková | 6–4, 4–6, 4–6 |
| Winner | 1. | 26 January 1998 | Ourense, Spain | Hard | (Spain) Lourdes Domínguez Lino | (Italy) Sabina Da Ponte (Italy) Monica Scartoni | 6–4, 6–4 |
| Winner | 2. | 6 July 1998 | Vigo, Spain | Clay | (Spain) Lourdes Domínguez Lino | (Chile) Paula Cabezas (Brazil) Vanessa Menga | 6–1, 4–6, 6–2 |
