= Faber Grand Prix =

Defunct tennis tournament
- Event name: Nokia Grand Prix (1992–94); Faber Grand Prix (1996–2000)
- Tour: WTA Tour
- Founded: 1992
- Abolished: 2000
- Editions: 8
- Location: Essen, Germany (1992–94, 1996); Hanover, Germany (1997–2000)
- Surface: Carpet

The Faber Grand Prix was a WTA Tour affiliated women's tennis tournament played from 1992 to 2000. It was held in Essen in Germany from 1992 to 1994 as well as in 1996, and subsequently in Hanover in Germany from 1997 to 2000. The tournament was played on indoor carpet courts.

== Results ==
=== Singles ===
Year	Champions	Runners-up	Score
1992 (E)	(Socialist Federal Republic of Yugoslavia) Monica Seles	(United States) Mary Joe Fernández	6–0, 6–3
1993 (E)	(Ukraine) Natalia Medvedeva	(Spain) Conchita Martínez	6–7, 7–5, 6–4
1994 (E)	(Czech Republic) Jana Novotná	(Croatia) Iva Majoli	6–2, 6–4
1995	Not held		
1996 (E)	(Croatia) Iva Majoli	(Czech Republic) Jana Novotná	7–5, 1–6, 7–6
1997 (H)	(Croatia) Iva Majoli	(Czech Republic) Jana Novotná	4–6, 7–6, 6–4
1998 (H)	(Switzerland) Patty Schnyder	(Czech Republic) Jana Novotná	6–0, 2–6, 7–5
1999 (H)	(Czech Republic) Jana Novotná	(United States) Venus Williams	6–4, 6–4
2000 (H)	(United States) Serena Williams	(Czech Republic) Denisa Chládková	6–1, 6–1

(E)=Essen, (H)=Hanover

=== Doubles ===
Year	Champions	Runners-up	Score
1992	(Bulgaria) Katerina Maleeva (Germany) Barbara Rittner	(Belgium) Sabine Appelmans (Germany) Claudia Porwik	7–5, 6–3
1993	(Spain) Arantxa Sánchez Vicario (Czech Republic) Helena Suková	(Germany) Wiltrud Probst (Germany) Christina Singer	6–2, 6–2
1994	(Sweden) Maria Lindström (Sweden) Maria Strandlund	(Russia) Eugenia Maniokova (Georgia (country)) Leila Meskhi	6–2, 6–1
1995	Not held		
1996	(United States) Meredith McGrath (Latvia) Larisa Neiland	(United States) Lori McNeil (Czech Republic) Helena Suková	3–6, 6–3, 6–2
1997	(United States) Nicole Arendt (Netherlands) Manon Bollegraf	(Latvia) Larisa Neiland (Netherlands) Brenda Schultz-McCarthy	4–6, 6–3, 7–6
1998	(United States) Lisa Raymond (Australia) Rennae Stubbs	(Russia) Elena Likhovtseva (Netherlands) Caroline Vis	6–1, 6–7, 6–3
1999	(United States) Serena Williams (United States) Venus Williams	(France) Alexandra Fusai (France) Nathalie Tauziat	5–7, 6–2, 6–2
2000	(Sweden) Åsa Carlsson (Belarus) Natasha Zvereva	(Italy) Silvia Farina Elia (Slovakia) Karina Habšudová	6–3, 6–4
