= 1983 National Panasonic Open =

- Date: 14–20 November
- Edition: 4th
- Draw: 56S / 32D
- Prize money: $150,000
- Surface: Grass / outdoor
- Location: Brisbane, Australia
- Venue: Milton Tennis Centre

Champions

Singles
- (United States) Pam Shriver

Doubles
- (United Kingdom) Anne Hobbs / (Australia) Wendy Turnbull
← 1982 ·	National Panasonic Open	· 1984 →

The 1983 National Panasonic Open was a women's tennis tournament played on outdoor grass courts at the Milton Tennis Centre in Brisbane, Australia that was part of the 1983 Virginia Slims World Championship Series. It was the fourth edition of the tournament and was held from 14 November through 20 November 1983. First-seeded Pam Shriver won the singles title and earned $27,500 first-prize money.

== Finals ==
=== Singles ===
(United States) Pam Shriver defeated (Australia) Wendy Turnbull 6–4, 7–5

- It was Shriver's 2nd singles title of the year and the 5th of her career.

=== Doubles ===
(United Kingdom) Anne Hobbs / (Australia) Wendy Turnbull defeated (United States) Pam Shriver / (United States) Sharon Walsh 6–3, 6–4

- It was Hobbs' 4th title of the year and the 5th of her career. It was Turnbull's 4th title of the year and the 55th of her career.

== Prize money ==
Event	W	F	SF	QF	Round of 16	Round of 32	Round of 64
Singles	$27,500	$14,000	$7,150	$3,300	$1,600	$800	$400
