= 1989 Danone Hardcourt Championships – Singles =

Singles
- 1989 Danone Hardcourt Championships

Final
- Champion: (Czechoslovakia) Helena Suková
- Runner-up: (Netherlands) Brenda Schultz
- Score: 7–6, 7–6

Details
- Draw: 48
- Seeds: 16

Events
Singles	Doubles
← 1988 ·	Danone Hardcourt Championships	· 1990 →

Pam Shriver was the defending champion but did not compete that year.

Helena Suková won in the final 7–6, 7–6 against Brenda Schultz.

== Seeds ==
A champion seed is indicated in bold text while text in italics indicates the round in which that seed was eliminated. The top eight seeds received a bye to the second round.

1. (Czechoslovakia) **Helena Suková (champion)**
2. (France) Pascale Paradis (third round)
3. (United States) Patty Fendick (semifinals)
4. (Australia) Anne Minter (quarterfinals)
5. (Australia) Hana Mandlíková (second round)
6. (Australia) Nicole Provis (third round)
7. (Czechoslovakia) Jana Novotná (quarterfinals)
8. (South Africa) Rosalyn Fairbank (second round)
9. (Netherlands) Brenda Schultz (final)
10. (Sweden) Catarina Lindqvist (third round)
11. (United States) Gretchen Magers (quarterfinals)
12. (United States) Ann Grossman (second round)
13. (United States) Terry Phelps (first round)
14. (Japan) Etsuko Inoue (first round)
15. (South Africa) Dianne Van Rensburg (third round)
16. (Australia) Dianne Balestrat (third round)

== Draw ==
=== Key ===
- Q = Qualifier
- WC = Wild card
- LL = Lucky loser
- Alt = Alternate
- SE = Special exempt
- PR = Protected ranking
- ITF = ITF entry
- JE = Junior exempt
- w/o = Walkover
- r = Retired
- d = Defaulted
- SR = Special ranking

=== Finals ===
Semifinals
1	(Czechoslovakia) **Helena Suková**	**6**	**6**
3	(United States) Patty Fendick	2	4
Q	(Australia) Jenny Byrne	1	**6**	4
9	(Netherlands) **Brenda Schultz**	**6**	2	**6**

Final
1	(Czechoslovakia) **Helena Suková**	**7**	**7**
9	(Netherlands) Brenda Schultz	6	6

=== Top half ===
==== Section 1 ====
First round
Q	(France) **A Dechaume**	**6**	**6**
Q	(Japan) A Nishiya	1	2
(United States) **C Cunningham**	**6**	1	**6**
(West Germany) S Meier	3	**6**	3
(Netherlands) N Jagerman	2	**6**	3
16	(Australia) **D Balestrat**	**6**	3	**6**
12	(United States) **A Grossman**	**6**	**7**
(Belgium) A Devries	3	5
(France) **N Herreman**	**6**	**6**
(Czechoslovakia) P Langrová	2	1
(France) **C Tanvier**	**6**	4	**6**
(France) J Halard	3	**6**	1

Second round
1	(Czechoslovakia) **H Suková**	**6**	**6**
Q	(France) A Dechaume	4	2
(United States) C Cunningham	**6**	3	5
16	(Australia) **D Balestrat**	4	**6**	**7**
12	(United States) A Grossman	5	1
(France) **N Herreman**	**7**	**6**
(France) **C Tanvier**	**6**	**6**
5	(Australia) H Mandlíková	4	4

Third round
1	(Czechoslovakia) **H Suková**	3	**7**	**6**
16	(Australia) D Balestrat	**6**	5	2
(France) N Herreman	3	0
(France) **C Tanvier**	**6**	**6**

Quarterfinals
1	(Czechoslovakia) **H Suková**	**6**	**6**
(France) C Tanvier	4	4

==== Section 2 ====
First round
(Hungary) A Temesvári	3	5
(Australia) **E Smylie**	**6**	**7**
(United States) B Bowes	4	0
(West Germany) **E Pfaff**	**6**	**6**
Q	(Canada) **R Simpson**	**6**	**6**
13	(United States) T Phelps	4	1
10	(Sweden) **C Lindqvist**	**6**	**6**
(United States) E Burgin	2	4
(United Kingdom) M Javer	3	5
(United States) **K Horvath**	**6**	**7**
(United States) R Reis	4	**7**	1
(Italy) **L Golarsa**	**6**	6	**6**

Second round
3	(United States) **P Fendick**	**6**	**7**
(Australia) E Smylie	4	6
(West Germany) E Pfaff	1	5
Q	(Canada) **R Simpson**	**6**	**7**
10	(Sweden) **C Lindqvist**	**6**	**6**
(United States) K Horvath	3	0
(Italy) L Golarsa	5	1
7	(Czechoslovakia) **J Novotná**	**7**	**6**

Third round
3	(United States) **P Fendick**	**6**	**6**
Q	(Canada) R Simpson	1	2
10	(Sweden) C Lindqvist	1	**6**	6
7	(Czechoslovakia) **J Novotná**	**6**	2	**7**

Quarterfinals
3	(United States) **P Fendick**	**6**	**6**
7	(Czechoslovakia) J Novotná	4	1

=== Bottom half ===
==== Section 3 ====
First round
Q	(Australia) **J Byrne**	**5**
(United States) K Adams	2	r
(Switzerland) **E Krapl**	**7**	6	**6**
(Italy) F Bonsignori	5	**7**	3
(West Germany) **C Porwik**	**7**	1	**6**
14	(Japan) E Inoue	5	**6**	3
15	(South Africa) **D Van Rensburg**	**6**	**6**
Q	(Australia) L Field	1	4
Q	(Netherlands) **C Bakkum**	**6**	**6**
(United States) M Werdel	1	1
(Japan) M Yanagi	1	4
(Canada) **J Hetherington**	**6**	**6**

Second round
8	(South Africa) R Fairbank	3	1
Q	(Australia) **J Byrne**	**6**	**6**
(Switzerland) E Krapl	4	1
(West Germany) **C Porwik**	**6**	**6**
15	(South Africa) **D Van Rensburg**	**6**	**6**
Q	(Netherlands) C Bakkum	2	4
(Canada) J Hetherington	1	1
4	(Australia) **A Minter**	**6**	**6**

Third round
Q	(Australia) **J Byrne**	**6**	**6**
(West Germany) C Porwik	3	2
15	(South Africa) D Van Rensburg	4	6
4	(Australia) **A Minter**	**6**	**7**

Quarterfinals
Q	(Australia) **J Byrne**	**6**	2	**6**
4	(Australia) A Minter	0	**6**	3

==== Section 4 ====
First round
(Netherlands) H Witvoet	3	5
(Netherlands) **M Bollegraf**	**6**	**7**
(Australia) **W Turnbull**	**6**	**6**
(United States) A Ivan	3	3
(New Zealand) J Richardson	3	4
11	(United States) **G Magers**	**6**	**6**
9	(Netherlands) **B Schultz**	6	**6**	**7**
Q	(France) E Derly	**7**	3	6
(United States) C Benjamin	**7**	6	4
Q	(Australia) **R McQuillan**	5	**7**	**6**
(Australia) S McCann	4	3
(United States) **B Herr**	**6**	**6**

Second round
6	(Australia) **N Provis**	5	**6**	**6**
(Netherlands) M Bollegraf	**7**	4	1
(Australia) W Turnbull	0	0
11	(United States) **G Magers**	**6**	**6**
9	(Netherlands) **B Schultz**	**7**	2	**6**
Q	(Australia) R McQuillan	6	**6**	3
(United States) B Herr	4	4
2	(France) **P Paradis**	**6**	**6**

Third round
6	(Australia) **N Provis**	**7**	**6**
11	(United States) G Magers	6	2
9	(Netherlands) **B Schultz**	**7**	**6**
2	(France) P Paradis	5	4

Quarterfinals
6	(Australia) N Provis	3	6
9	(Netherlands) **B Schultz**	**6**	**7**
