= 1981 National Panasonic Classic =

- Date: 16–22 November
- Edition: 2nd
- Category: Category 4
- Draw: 56S / 30D
- Prize money: $125,000
- Surface: Grass / outdoor
- Location: Perth, Australia

Champions

Singles
- (United States) Pam Shriver

Doubles
- (United States) Barbara Potter / (United States) Sharon Walsh
← 1980 ·	National Panasonic Open	· 1982 →

The 1981 National Panasonic Classic was a women's tennis tournament played on outdoor grass courts in Perth, Australia that was part of the Category 4 tier of the 1981 WTA Tour. It was the second edition of the tournament and was held from 16 November through 22 November 1981. Third-seeded Pam Shriver won the singles title and earned $22,000 first-prize money.

== Finals ==
=== Singles ===
(United States) Pam Shriver defeated (United States) Andrea Jaeger 6–1, 7–6^{(7–4)}

- It was Shriver's 1st singles title of the year and the 3rd of her career.

=== Doubles ===
(United States) Barbara Potter / (United States) Sharon Walsh defeated (United States) Betsy Nagelsen / (United States) Candy Reynolds 6–4, 6–2

== Prize money ==
Event	W	F	SF	QF	Round of 16	Round of 32	Round of 64
Singles	$22,000	$11,000	$5,500	$2,800	$1,400	$700	$325
