= 1987 Jason 2000 Classic =

- Date: 29 December – 4 January 1987
- Edition: 1st
- Category: 2
- Draw: 56S / 32D
- Prize money: $100,000
- Surface: Grass / outdoor
- Location: Brisbane, Australia
- Venue: Milton Tennis Centre

Champions

Singles
- (Czechoslovakia) Hana Mandlíková

Doubles
- (Czechoslovakia) Hana Mandlíková / (Australia) Wendy Turnbull
| Danone Hardcourt Championships | · 1988 → |

The 1987 Jason 2000 Classic was a women's tennis tournament played on grass courts at the Milton Tennis Centre in Brisbane, Australia and was part of the Category 2 tier of the 1987 Virginia Slims World Championship Series. It was the inaugural edition of the tournament and was held from 29 December 1986 through 4 January 1987. First-seeded Hana Mandlíková won the singles title.

== Finals ==
=== Singles ===
(Czechoslovakia) Hana Mandlíková defeated (United States) Pam Shriver 6–2, 2–6, 6–4

- It was Mandlíková's 1st singles title of the year and the 25th of her career.

=== Doubles ===
(Czechoslovakia) Hana Mandlíková / (Australia) Wendy Turnbull defeated (United States) Betsy Nagelsen / (Australia) Elizabeth Smylie 6–4, 6–2

- It was Mandlíková's 1st doubles title of the year and the 15th of her career. It was Turnbull's 1st doubles title of the year and the 52nd of her career.
