= Robert Frew =

Robert Frew may refer to:

- Robert Frew (bookseller) (born 1951), British antiquarian bookseller
- Robert Dickson Alison Frew (died 1930), civil engineer and tennis enthusiast in Queensland, Australia
- Robbie Frew (Robert Mathew Frew, born 1970), New Zealand former cricketer
