= 1989 Danone Hardcourt Championships =

- Date: 2–8 January
- Edition: 3rd
- Category: Category 2
- Draw: 56S / 28D
- Prize money: $150,000
- Surface: Hard / outdoor
- Location: Brisbane, Australia

Champions

Singles
- (Czechoslovakia) Helena Suková

Doubles
- (Czechoslovakia) Jana Novotná / (Czechoslovakia) Helena Suková
← 1988 ·	Danone Hardcourt Championships	· 1990 →

The 1989 Danone Hardcourt Championships was a women's tennis tournament played on outdoor hard courts at the Milton Tennis Centre in Brisbane in Australia and was part of the Category 2 tier of the 1989 WTA Tour. The tournament ran from 2 through 8 January 1989. First-seeded Helena Suková won the singles title.

== Finals ==
=== Singles ===
(Czechoslovakia) Helena Suková defeated (Netherlands) Brenda Schultz 7–6^{(8–6)}, 7–6^{(8–6)}

- It was Suková's 1st singles title of the year and the 7th of her career.

=== Doubles ===
(Czechoslovakia) Jana Novotná / (Czechoslovakia) Helena Suková defeated (United States) Patty Fendick / (Canada) Jill Hetherington 6–7^{(4–7)}, 6–1, 6–2

- It was Novotná's 1st title of the year and the 13th of her career. It was Suková's 2nd title of the year and the 34th of her career.
