= 1992 Danone Women's Open – Doubles =

Doubles
- 1992 Danone Women's Open

Final
- Champions: (Czechoslovakia) Jana Novotná (Soviet Union) Larisa Savchenko-Neiland
- Runners-up: (Netherlands) Manon Bollegraf (Australia) Nicole Provis
- Score: 6–4, 6–3

Details
- Draw: 28 (1Q)
- Seeds: 8

Events
Singles	Doubles
← 1991 ·	Danone Australian Hardcourt Championships	· 1993 →

Gigi Fernández and Jana Novotná were the defending champions, but Fernández did not compete this year.

Novotná teamed up with Larisa Savchenko-Neiland and successfully defended her title, by defeating Manon Bollegraf and Nicole Provis 6–4, 6–3 in the final.

== Seeds ==
The first four seeds received a bye to the second round.

1. (Czechoslovakia) Jana Novotná / (Soviet Union) Larisa Savchenko-Neiland (champions)
2. (Netherlands) Manon Bollegraf / (Australia) Nicole Provis (final)
3. (n/a)
4. (France) Isabelle Demongeot / (Japan) Maya Kidowaki (semifinals)
5. (Czechoslovakia) Andrea Strnadová / (France) Catherine Tanvier (first round)
6. (n/a)
7. (Australia) Rachel McQuillan / (Netherlands) Nicole Muns-Jagerman (quarterfinals)
8. (Australia) Louise Field / (South Africa) Lise Gregory (semifinals)

== Draw ==
=== Key ===
- Q = Qualifier
- WC = Wild card
- LL = Lucky loser
- Alt = Alternate
- ITF = ITF entry
- PR = Protected ranking
- SR = Special ranking
- SE = Special exempt
- JE = Junior exempt
- JR = Junior Accelerator Programme entrant
- CO = College Accelerator Programme entrant
- NG = Next Gen Accelerator Program entrant
- w/o = Walkover
- r = Retired
- d = Defaulted

=== Finals ===
Semifinals
1	(Czechoslovakia) Jana Novotná (Soviet Union) Larisa Savchenko-Neiland	6	6
4	(France) Isabelle Demongeot (Japan) Maya Kidowaki	4	0
8	(Australia) Louise Field (South Africa) Lise Gregory	6	4	3
2	(Netherlands) Manon Bollegraf (Australia) Nicole Provis	2	6	6

Final
1	(Czechoslovakia) Jana Novotná (Soviet Union) Larisa Savchenko-Neiland	6	6
2	(Netherlands) Manon Bollegraf (Australia) Nicole Provis	4	3

=== Top half ===
First round
(France) A Dechaume (France) N Herreman	6	2	6^{6}
(Canada) R Alter (United States) L Harvey Wild	2	6	7^{8}
(Germany) A Marchl (Poland) M Mróz	1	3
(Germany) M Babel (Germany) B Rittner	6	6
(Australia) KA Guse (Australia) K Sharpe	0	1
7	(Australia) R McQuillan (Netherlands) N Muns-Jagerman	6	6
(Australia) M Jaggard (New Zealand) J Richardson	3	6	7
(United States) D Graham (United States) K Po	6	4	5
(Netherlands) I Driehuis (Australia) L Pleming	3	3
(Japan) N Kijimuta (Japan) A Nishiya	6	6
(Czechoslovakia) R Rajchrtová (Czechoslovakia) R Zrubáková	3	6	4
(United States) A Gooden (United States) C Kuhlman	6	4	6

Second round
1	(Czechoslovakia) J Novotná (Soviet Union) L Savchenko-Neiland	5	6	6
(Canada) R Alter (United States) L Harvey Wild	7	4	2
(Germany) M Babel (Germany) B Rittner	3	1
7	(Australia) R McQuillan (Netherlands) N Muns-Jagerman	6	6
4	(France) I Demongeot (Japan) M Kidowaki	6	6
(Australia) M Jaggard (New Zealand) J Richardson	3	3
(Japan) N Kijimuta (Japan) A Nishiya	4	3
(United States) A Gooden (United States) C Kuhlman	6	6

Quarterfinals
1	(Czechoslovakia) J Novotná (Soviet Union) L Savchenko-Neiland	6	6
7	(Australia) R McQuillan (Netherlands) N Muns-Jagerman	1	2
4	(France) I Demongeot (Japan) M Kidowaki	6^{5}	7^{7}	6
(United States) A Gooden (United States) C Kuhlman	7^{7}	6^{4}	3

Semifinals
1	(Czechoslovakia) J Novotná (Soviet Union) L Savchenko-Neiland	6	6
4	(France) I Demongeot (Japan) M Kidowaki	4	0

=== Bottom half ===
First round
8	(Australia) L Field (South Africa) L Gregory	3	6	6
(Australia) K Godridge (Australia) N Pratt	6	3	3
(Australia) J Hodder (Germany) C Schneider	6^{1}	6	2
(Luxembourg) K Kschwendt (Czechoslovakia) D Szabová	7^{7}	3	6
(Australia) JA Faull (Australia) R Stubbs	6	6
(Australia) T Morton (United Kingdom) C Wood	3	1
5	(Czechoslovakia) A Strnadová (France) C Tanvier	2	3
(Japan) R Hiraki (West Germany) E Pfaff	6	6
(Mexico) L Novelo (Australia) K Radford	6	6
Q	(Finland) N Dahlman (Germany) S Frankl	4	4
(United States) N Arendt (United States) G Helgeson	5	6	6
(Japan) M Miyauchi (Finland) P Thorén	7	0	0

Second round
8	(Australia) L Field (South Africa) L Gregory	w/o
(Luxembourg) K Kschwendt (Czechoslovakia) D Szabová
(Australia) JA Faull (Australia) R Stubbs	6	6
(Australia) D Jones (Australia) C Thompson	3	1
(Japan) R Hiraki (West Germany) E Pfaff	6	2	0
(Mexico) L Novelo (Australia) K Radford	4	6	6
(United States) N Arendt (United States) G Helgeson	3	4
2	(Netherlands) M Bollegraf (Australia) N Provis	6	6

Quarterfinals
8	(Australia) L Field (South Africa) L Gregory	6	6
(Australia) JA Faull (Australia) R Stubbs	4	4
(Mexico) L Novelo (Australia) K Radford	2	6	1
2	(Netherlands) M Bollegraf (Australia) N Provis	6	4	6

Semifinals
8	(Australia) L Field (South Africa) L Gregory	6	4	3
2	(Netherlands) M Bollegraf (Australia) N Provis	2	6	6
