= 1989 Danone Hardcourt Championships – Doubles =

Doubles
- 1988 Ariadne Classic
- 1987 Champions: (United States) Betsy Nagelsen; (United States) Pam Shriver

Final
- Champions: (Czechoslovakia) Jana Novotná; (Czechoslovakia) Helena Suková
- Runners-up: (United States) Patty Fendick; (Canada) Jill Hetherington
- Score: 6–7, 6–1, 6–2

Events
Singles	Doubles
← 1987 ·	Ariadne Classic	· 1989 →

Betsy Nagelsen and Pam Shriver were the defending champions but did not compete that year.

Jana Novotná and Helena Suková won in the final 6–7, 6–1, 6–2 against Patty Fendick and Jill Hetherington.

== Seeds ==
Champion seeds are indicated in bold text while text in italics indicates the round in which those seeds were eliminated. The top four seeded teams received byes into the second round.

1. (Czechoslovakia) **Jana Novotná** / (Czechoslovakia) **Helena Suková (champions)**
2. (United States) Patty Fendick / (Canada) Jill Hetherington (final)
3. (Australia) Elizabeth Smylie / (Australia) Wendy Turnbull (quarterfinals)
4. (United States) Katrina Adams / (South Africa) Dianne Van Rensburg (second round)
5. n/a
6. (Australia) Jenny Byrne / (Australia) Janine Tremelling (semifinals)
7. (Netherlands) Manon Bollegraf / (West Germany) Eva Pfaff (semifinals)
8. (United States) Kathleen Horvath / (United States) Terry Phelps (first round)

== Draw ==
=== Key ===
- Q = Qualifier
- WC = Wild card
- LL = Lucky loser
- Alt = Alternate
- SE = Special exempt
- PR = Protected ranking
- ITF = ITF entry
- JE = Junior exempt
- w/o = Walkover
- r = Retired
- d = Defaulted
- SR = Special ranking

=== Final ===
Final

1
- (Czechoslovakia) **Jana Novotná**
- (Czechoslovakia) **Helena Suková**
6
**6**
**6**

2
- (United States) Patty Fendick
- (Canada) Jill Hetherington
**7**
1
2

=== Top half ===
First round

Second round

Quarterfinals

Semifinals

1
- (Czechoslovakia) **J Novotná**
- (Czechoslovakia) **H Suková**
**7**
4
**7**

- (South Africa) **L Gregory**
- (United States) **R Reis**
**6**
**6**

- (South Africa) L Gregory
- (United States) R Reis
6
**6**
6

- (Australia) A Minter
- (Netherlands) H Witvoet
2
1

1
- (Czechoslovakia) **J Novotná**
- (Czechoslovakia) **H Suková**
**6**
**6**

- (Australia) K-A Guse
- (Australia) L Guse
3
2

- (United States) B Bowes
- (United States) S Collins
3
4

- (United States) **B Bowes**
- (United States) **S Collins**
**6**
**6**

- (United States) **B Bowes**
- (United States) **S Collins**
**6**
**7**

- (Australia) J-A Faull
- (Australia) R McQuillan
3
**6**
5

LL
- (United States) J Fuchs
- (United States) J Smoller
2
5

LL
- (United States) **J Fuchs**
- (United States) **J Smoller**
**6**
4
**7**

1
- (Czechoslovakia) **J Novotná**
- (Czechoslovakia) **H Suková**
4
**6**
**6**

7
- (Netherlands) M Bollegraf
- (West Germany) E Pfaff
**6**
1
4

4
- (United States) K Adams
- (South Africa) D Van Rensburg
4
**6**
2

- (Australia) **H Mandlíková**
- (Australia) **N Provis**
**6**
3
**6**

- (Australia) **H Mandlíková**
- (Australia) **N Provis**
**6**
4
**6**

- (United States) L Antonoplis
- (United States) J Thomas
3
**6**
1

- (Australia) H Mandlíková
- (Australia) N Provis
3
2

- (France) A Dechaume
- (France) E Derly
2
4

7
- (Netherlands) **M Bollegraf**
- (West Germany) **E Pfaff**
**6**
**6**

- (Sweden) **C Lindqvist**
- (New Zealand) **J Richardson**
**6**
**6**

- (Sweden) C Lindqvist
- (New Zealand) J Richardson
4
1

- (Australia) D Balestrat
- (Australia) A Scott
4
2

7
- (Netherlands) **M Bollegraf**
- (West Germany) **E Pfaff**
**6**
**6**

7
- (Netherlands) **M Bollegraf**
- (West Germany) **E Pfaff**
**6**
**6**

=== Bottom half ===
First round

Second round

Quarterfinals

Semifinals

6
- (Australia) **J Byrne**
- (Australia) **J Tremelling**
**6**
**6**

- (Japan) Y Koizumi
- (Japan) E Okagawa
2
1

6
- (Australia) **J Byrne**
- (Australia) **J Tremelling**
4
**6**
**6**

- (United States) **B Herr**
- (Hungary) **A Temesvári**
**6**
**6**

- (United States) B Herr
- (Hungary) A Temesvári
**6**
4
3

- (Belgium) A Devries
- (Netherlands) N Jagerman
2
3

6
- (Australia) **J Byrne**
- (Australia) **J Tremelling**
**6**
**7**

- (United States) **C Benjamin**
- (United States) **G Magers**
**7**
**6**

3
- (Australia) E Smylie
- (Australia) W Turnbull
1
5

- (Switzerland) E Krapl
- (Czechoslovakia) P Langrová
5
3

- (United States) C Benjamin
- (United States) G Magers
5
**6**
4

3
- (Australia) **E Smylie**
- (Australia) **W Turnbull**
**7**
4
**6**

6
- (Australia) J Byrne
- (Australia) J Tremelling
1
2

8
- (United States) K Horvath
- (United States) T Phelps
2
1

2
- (United States) **P Fendick**
- (Canada) **J Hetherington**
**6**
**6**

- (Sweden) **M Lindström**
- (United States) **H Ludloff**
**6**
**6**

- (Sweden) **M Lindström**
- (United States) **H Ludloff**
3
**6**
**7**

- (Netherlands) C Bakkum
- (Netherlands) B Schultz
2
1

- (Australia) L Field
- (Australia) M Jaggard
**6**
3
6

- (Australia) **L Field**
- (Australia) **M Jaggard**
**6**
**6**

- (Sweden) M Lindström
- (United States) H Ludloff
5
3

- (Australia) K McDonald
- (Australia) R Stubbs
4
0

2
- (United States) **P Fendick**
- (Canada) **J Hetherington**
**7**
**6**

- (West Germany) **C Porwik**
- (France) **C Tanvier**
**6**
**6**

- (West Germany) C Porwik
- (France) C Tanvier
6
**6**
3

2
- (United States) **P Fendick**
- (Canada) **J Hetherington**
**7**
4
**6**
