= 1990 Danone Hardcourt Championships – Doubles =

Doubles
- 1990 Danone Hardcourt Championships

Final
- Champions: (Czechoslovakia) Jana Novotná (Czechoslovakia) Helena Suková
- Runners-up: (Australia) Hana Mandlíková (United States) Pam Shriver
- Score: 6–3, 6–1

Details
- Draw: 28
- Seeds: 8

Events
Singles	Doubles
← 1989 ·	Danone Australian Hardcourt Championships	· 1991 →

Jana Novotná and Helena Suková successfully defended their title by defeating Hana Mandlíková and Pam Shriver 6–3, 6–1 in the final.

== Seeds ==
The first four seeds received a bye into the second round.

1. (Czechoslovakia) Jana Novotná / (Czechoslovakia) Helena Suková (champions)
2. (Australia) Hana Mandlíková / (United States) Pam Shriver (final)
3. (Australia) Janine Tremelling / (Australia) Wendy Turnbull (second round)
4. (Canada) Jill Hetherington / (Australia) Nicole Provis (second round)
5. (United States) Elise Burgin / (South Africa) Rosalyn Fairbank (quarterfinals)
6. (Netherlands) Brenda Schultz / (Hungary) Andrea Temesvári (first round)
7. (United States) Kathy Jordan / (Australia) Elizabeth Smylie (semifinals)
8. (Netherlands) Manon Bollegraf / (West Germany) Claudia Porwik (quarterfinals)

== Draw ==
=== Key ===
- Q = Qualifier
- WC = Wild card
- LL = Lucky loser
- Alt = Alternate
- SE = Special exempt
- PR = Protected ranking
- ITF = ITF entry
- JE = Junior exempt
- w/o = Walkover
- r = Retired
- d = Defaulted
- SR = Special ranking

=== Finals ===
Semifinals
1	(Czechoslovakia) Jana Novotná (Czechoslovakia) Helena Suková	7	6
7	(United States) Kathy Jordan (Australia) Elizabeth Smylie	6	0
(Sweden) Maria Lindström (United States) Heather Ludloff	1	4
2	(Australia) Hana Mandlíková (United States) Pam Shriver	6	6

Final
1	(Czechoslovakia) Jana Novotná (Czechoslovakia) Helena Suková	6	6
2	(Australia) Hana Mandlíková (United States) Pam Shriver	3	1

=== Top half ===
First round
(France) A Dechaume (Austria) H Sprung	2	1
(France) I Demongeot (France) C Tanvier	6	6
(Australia) KA Guse (Australia) N Pratt	4	1
(Netherlands) C Bakkum (South Africa) D Van Rensburg	6	6
(United States) Ca Macgregor (United States) Cy MacGregor	4	1
5	(United States) E Burgin (South Africa) R Fairbank	6	6
(Socialist Federal Republic of Yugoslavia) S Goleš (United States) J Smoller	6	5	7
(Australia) L Stacey (Australia) J Taylor	4	7	6
(Czechoslovakia) J Pospíšilová (Czechoslovakia) R Rajchrtová	6	6
(New Zealand) B Cordwell (Australia) A Minter	4	2
(United States) P Fendick (United States) K Rinaldi	7	4	6
7	(United States) K Jordan (Australia) E Smylie	6	6	7

Second round
1	(Czechoslovakia) J Novotná (Czechoslovakia) H Suková	6	6
(France) I Demongeot (France) C Tanvier	3	2
(Netherlands) C Bakkum (South Africa) D Van Rensburg	1	3
5	(United States) E Burgin (South Africa) R Fairbank	6	6
4	(Canada) J Hetherington (Australia) B Provis	3	6	3
(Socialist Federal Republic of Yugoslavia) S Goleš (United States) J Smoller	6	1	6
(Czechoslovakia) J Pospíšilová (Czechoslovakia) R Rajchrtová	4	0
7	(United States) K Jordan (Australia) E Smylie	6	6

Quarterfinals
1	(Czechoslovakia) J Novotná (Czechoslovakia) H Suková	6	6
5	(United States) E Burgin (South Africa) R Fairbank	4	2
(Socialist Federal Republic of Yugoslavia) S Goleš (United States) J Smoller	3	2
7	(United States) K Jordan (Australia) E Smylie	6	6

Semifinals
1	(Czechoslovakia) J Novotná (Czechoslovakia) H Suková	7	6
7	(United States) K Jordan (Australia) E Smylie	6	0

=== Bottom half ===
First round
6	(Netherlands) B Schultz (Hungary) A Temesvári	6	6
(Australia) R McQuillan (Australia) K Radford	7	7
(Australia) L Field (South Africa) L Gregory	4	6	6
(France) N Herreman (France) C Suire	6	4	1
(Switzerland) C Cohen (Australia) L O'Neill	6	5	4
(Sweden) M Lindström (United States) H Ludloff	4	7	6
8	(Netherlands) M Bollegraf (West Germany) C Porwik	6	6
(United States) A Henricksson (West Germany) E Pfaff	4	3
(United States) R Reis (United States) S Stafford	6	6
(Austria) B Paulus (Czechoslovakia) R Zrubáková	2	4
(Australia) M Jaggard (United States) T Phelps	7	2	6
(Italy) L Golarsa (Austria) J Wiesner	6	6	7

Second round
(Australia) R McQuillan (Australia) K Radford	4	4
(Australia) L Field (South Africa) L Gregory	6	6
(Sweden) M Lindström (United States) H Ludloff	6	6
3	(Australia) J Tremelling (Australia) W Turnbull	3	4
8	(Netherlands) M Bollegraf (West Germany) C Porwik	6	3	6
(United States) R Reis (United States) S Stafford	3	6	1
(Italy) L Golarsa (Austria) J Wiesner	5	6	2
2	(Australia) H Mandlíková (United States) P Shriver	7	4	6

Quarterfinals
(Australia) L Field (South Africa) L Gregory	6	7	4
(Sweden) M Lindström (United States) H Ludloff	7	6	6
8	(Netherlands) M Bollegraf (West Germany) C Porwik	5	6	4
2	(Australia) H Mandlíková (United States) P Shriver	7	3	6

Semifinals
(Sweden) M Lindström (United States) H Ludloff	1	4
2	(Australia) H Mandlíková (United States) P Shriver	6	6
