= 1992 Danone Women's Open =

- Date: 30 December 1991 – 5 January 1992
- Edition: 6th
- Category: Tier IV
- Draw: 56S / 28D
- Prize money: $150,000
- Surface: Hard / outdoor
- Location: Brisbane, Australia
- Venue: Milton Tennis Centre

Champions

Singles
- (Australia) Nicole Provis

Doubles
- (Czechoslovakia) Jana Novotná (Soviet Union) Larisa Savchenko-Neiland
- Danone Hardcourt Championships

The 1992 Danone Women's Open was a women's tennis tournament played on outdoor hard courts at the Milton Tennis Centre in Brisbane in Australia and was part of the Tier IV category of the 1992 WTA Tour. It was the sixth edition of the tournament and was held from 30 December 1991 through 5 January 1992. Nicole Provis, who was seeded 14th, won the singles title.

== Finals ==
=== Singles ===
(Australia) Nicole Provis defeated (Australia) Rachel McQuillan 6–3, 6–2

- It was Provis's only singles title of the year and the 1st of her career.

=== Doubles ===
(Czechoslovakia) Jana Novotná / (Soviet Union) Larisa Savchenko-Neiland defeated (Netherlands) Manon Bollegraf / (Australia) Nicole Provis 6–4, 6–3

- It was Novotná's 1st doubles title of the year and the 32nd of her career. It was Savchenko-Neiland's 1st doubles title of the year and the 22nd of her career.
