= 1982 National Panasonic Open =

- Date: 15–21 November
- Edition: 3rd
- Category: Category 4
- Draw: 56S / 32D
- Prize money: $125,000
- Surface: Grass / outdoor
- Location: Brisbane, Australia
- Venue: Milton Tennis Centre

Champions

Singles
- (Australia) Wendy Turnbull

Doubles
- (United States) Billie Jean King / (United States) Anne Smith
← 1981 ·	National Panasonic Open	· 1983 →

The 1982 National Panasonic Open was a women's tennis tournament played on outdoor grass courts at the Milton Tennis Centre in Brisbane, Australia that was part of the Category 4 tier of the 1982 WTA Tour. It was the third edition of the tournament and was held from 15 November through 21 November 1982. Third-seeded Wendy Turnbull won the singles title and earned $22,000 first-prize money.

== Finals ==
=== Singles ===
(Australia) Wendy Turnbull defeated (United States) Pam Shriver 6–3, 6–1

- It was Turnbull's 1st singles title of the year and the 8th of her career.

=== Doubles ===
(United States) Billie Jean King / (United States) Anne Smith defeated (West Germany) Eva Pfaff / (West Germany) Claudia Kohde-Kilsch 6–3, 6–4

== Prize money ==
Event	W	F	SF	QF	Round of 16	Round of 32	Round of 64
Singles	$22,000	$11,000	$5,575	$2,600	$1,300	$700	$350
