= 1992 Danone Women's Open – Singles =

Singles
- 1992 Danone Women's Open

Final
- Champion: (Australia) Nicole Provis
- Runner-up: (Australia) Rachel McQuillan
- Score: 6–3, 6–2

Details
- Draw: 56 (3WC/7Q/3LL)
- Seeds: 16

Events
Singles	Doubles
← 1991 ·	Danone Australian Hardcourt Championships	· 1993 →

Helena Suková was the defending champion, but chose to compete at the Hopman Cup during the same week.

Nicole Provis won the title by defeating Rachel McQuillan 6–3, 6–2 in the final.

== Seeds ==
The first eight seeds received a bye to the second round.

1. (Czechoslovakia) Jana Novotná (third round)
2. (n/a)
3. (Belgium) Sabine Appelmans (third round)
4. (Czechoslovakia) Radka Zrubáková (quarterfinals)
5. (Austria) Barbara Paulus (third round)
6. (Switzerland) Emanuela Zardo (second round)
7. (Czechoslovakia) Andrea Strnadová (second round)
8. (Australia) Rachel McQuillan (final)
9. (United States) Pam Shriver (second round)
10. (Bulgaria) Magdalena Maleeva (semifinals)
11. (Czechoslovakia) Regina Rajchrtová (second round)
12. (United States) Linda Harvey Wild (second round)
13. (United States) Debbie Graham (semifinals)
14. (Australia) Nicole Provis (champion)
15. (Soviet Union) Larisa Savchenko-Neiland (first round)
16. (Australia) Anne Minter (first round)

== Draw ==
=== Key ===
- Q = Qualifier
- WC = Wild card
- LL = Lucky loser
- Alt = Alternate
- ITF = ITF entry
- PR = Protected ranking
- SR = Special ranking
- SE = Special exempt
- JE = Junior exempt
- JR = Junior Accelerator Programme entrant
- CO = College Accelerator Programme entrant
- NG = Next Gen Accelerator Program entrant
- w/o = Walkover
- r = Retired
- d = Defaulted

=== Finals ===
Quarterfinals
LL	(Hungary) Andrea Temesvári	3	0
14	(Australia) Nicole Provis	6	6
4	(Czechoslovakia) Radka Zrubáková	4	5
10	(Bulgaria) Magdalena Maleeva	6	7
(Japan) Mana Endo	2	3
13	(United States) Debbie Graham	6	6
8	(Australia) Rachel McQuillan	6	6
(Germany) Claudia Kohde-Kilsch	3	3

Semifinals
14	(Australia) Nicole Provis	4	7	6
10	(Bulgaria) Magdalena Maleeva	6	5	2
13	(United States) Debbie Graham	5	4
8	(Australia) Rachel McQuillan	7	6

Final
14	(Australia) Nicole Provis	6	6
8	(Australia) Rachel McQuillan	3	2

=== Top half ===
==== Section 1 ====
First round
(Japan) R Hiraki	5	6^{6}
Q	(Japan) M Miyauchi	7	7^{8}
(United Kingdom) C Wood	5	6	1
(Germany) C Porwik	7	3	6
LL	(Hungary) A Temesvári	6	6
16	(Australia) A Minter	2	2
14	(Australia) N Provis	6	6
(Netherlands) P Kamstra	1	1
(France) N Herreman	1	6	3
(United States) K Po	6	3	6
(Germany) S Frankl	6	6
Q	(New Zealand) C Toleafoa	4	4

Second round
1	(Czechoslovakia) J Novotná	6	6
Q	(Japan) M Miyauchi	2	2
(Germany) C Porwik
LL	(Hungary) A Temesvári	w/o
14	(Australia) N Provis	7	6
(United States) K Po	5	2
(Germany) S Frankl	7	4	6
7	(Czechoslovakia) A Strnadová	5	6	4

Third round
1	(Czechoslovakia) J Novotná	3	3
LL	(Hungary) A Temesvári	6	6
14	(Australia) N Provis	6	6
(Germany) S Frankl	3	2

Quarterfinals
LL	(Hungary) A Temesvári	3	0
14	(Australia) N Provis	6	6

==== Section 2 ====
First round
LL	(France) S Niox-Château	6	6
Q	(Australia) J Limmer	3	3
(France) A Dechaume	5	1
(Canada) R Alter	7	6
Q	(Germany) E Pfaff	1	3
12	(United States) L Harvey Wild	6	6
10	(Bulgaria) M Maleeva	6	6
(Czechoslovakia) D Szabová	0	2
(Australia) K Godridge	4	6	6
(Austria) M Maruska	6	3	2
(Germany) M Kochta	6	6
(Belgium) D Monami	1	4

Second round
4	(Czechoslovakia) R Zrubáková	6	6
LL	(France) S Niox-Château	0	3
(Canada) R Alter	6	6
12	(United States) L Harvey Wild	4	2
10	(Bulgaria) M Maleeva	6	6
(Australia) K Godridge	1	2
(Germany) M Kochta	3	6^{1}
5	(Austria) B Paulus	6	7^{7}

Third round
4	(Czechoslovakia) R Zrubáková	6	6
(Canada) R Alter	4	1
10	(Bulgaria) M Maleeva	6	7
5	(Austria) B Paulus	3	5

Quarterfinals
4	(Czechoslovakia) R Zrubáková	4	5
10	(Bulgaria) M Maleeva	6	7

=== Bottom half ===
==== Section 3 ====
First round
(Germany) M Živec-Škulj	3	4
Q	(Netherlands) M Oremans	6	6
Q	(United States) S Martin	1	4
(Japan) M Endo	6	6
(Japan) A Kijimuta	4	4
9	(United States) P Shriver	6	6
13	(United States) D Graham	6	7^{7}
(Germany) K Kschwendt	4	6^{3}
(Argentina) C Tessi	6	6
(France) C Tanvier	2	1
Q	(Germany) M Babel	6	5	6
(France) I Demongeot	4	7	3

Second round
6	(Switzerland) E Zardo	3	3
Q	(Netherlands) M Oremans	6	6
(Japan) M Endo	7^{10}	6
9	(United States) P Shriver	6^{8}	4
13	(United States) D Graham	6	6
(Argentina) C Tessi	3	4
Q	(Germany) M Babel	2	2
3	(Belgium) S Appelmans	6	6

Third round
Q	(Netherlands) M Oremans	2	3
(Japan) M Endo	6	6
13	(United States) D Graham	6	6
3	(Belgium) S Appelmans	2	2

Quarterfinals
(Japan) M Endo	2	3
13	(United States) D Graham	6	6

==== Section 4 ====
First round
WC	(Australia) KA Guse	7	6
(Netherlands) N Muns-Jagerman	5	1
Q	(France) N van Lottum	3^{r}
(France) S Testud	5
(Finland) P Thorén	6	6
15	(Soviet Union) L Savchenko-Neiland	1	2
11	(Czechoslovakia) R Rajchrtová	3	6	6
WC	(Australia) J Byrne	6	3	4
(Germany) C Kohde-Kilsch	6	6
(Japan) M Kidowaki	2	2
WC	(Australia) N Pratt	6	6
(Austria) P Ritter	2	0

Second round
8	(Australia) R McQuillan	6	6
WC	(Australia) KA Guse	3	1
(France) S Testud	4	4
(Finland) P Thorén	6	6
11	(Czechoslovakia) R Rajchrtová	1	4
(Germany) C Kohde-Kilsch	6	6
WC	(Australia) N Pratt	7	6
LL	(Finland) N Dahlman	5	1

Third round
8	(Australia) R McQuillan	6	3	6
(Finland) P Thorén	3	6	4
(Germany) C Kohde-Kilsch	6	6
WC	(Australia) N Pratt	3	3

Quarterfinals
8	(Australia) R McQuillan	6	6
(Germany) C Kohde-Kilsch	3	3
