= 1985 National Panasonic Women's Classic =

- Date: 11–17 November
- Edition: 6th
- Category: Category 3
- Draw: 56S / 32D
- Prize money: $150,000
- Surface: Grass / outdoor
- Location: Brisbane, Australia
- Venue: Milton Tennis Centre

Champions

Singles
- (United States) Martina Navratilova

Doubles
- (United States) Martina Navratilova / (United States) Pam Shriver
| ← 1984 · | National Panasonic Open |

The 1985 National Panasonic Women's Classic was a women's tennis tournament played on outdoor grass courts at the Milton Tennis Centre in Brisbane, Australia that was part of the Category 3 tier of the 1985 Virginia Slims World Championship Series. It was the sixth, and final, edition of the tournament and was held from 11 through 17 November 1985. First-seeded Martina Navratilova won the singles title and earned $26,000 first-prize money.

== Finals ==
=== Singles ===
(United States) Martina Navratilova defeated (United States) Pam Shriver 6–3, 7–5

- It was Navratilova's 10th singles title of the year and the 109th of her career.

=== Doubles ===
(United States) Martina Navratilova / (United States) Pam Shriver defeated (West Germany) Claudia Kohde-Kilsch / (Czechoslovakia) Helena Suková 6–4, 6–7^{(6–8)}, 6–1
