= 1990 Danone Hardcourt Championships – Singles =

Singles
- 1990 Danone Hardcourt Championships

Final
- Champion: (Soviet Union) Natasha Zvereva
- Runner-up: (Australia) Rachel McQuillan
- Score: 6–4, 6–0

Details
- Draw: 56
- Seeds: 16

Events
Singles	Doubles
← 1989 ·	Danone Australian Hardcourt Championships	· 1991 →

Helena Suková was the defending champion, but lost in the quarterfinals to Natasha Zvereva.

Zvereva won the title by defeating Rachel McQuillan 6–4, 6–0 in the final.

== Seeds ==
The first eight seeds received a bye into the second round.

1. (Czechoslovakia) Helena Suková (quarterfinals)
2. (Czechoslovakia) Jana Novotná (quarterfinals)
3. (n/a)
4. (South Africa) Rosalyn Fairbank (second round)
5. (Austria) Barbara Paulus (second round)
6. (Soviet Union) Natasha Zvereva (champion)
7. (United States) Patty Fendick (third round)
8. (Czechoslovakia) Radka Zrubáková (third round)
9. (Australia) Anne Minter (first round)
10. (Austria) Judith Wiesner (semifinals)
11. (Netherlands) Manon Bollegraf (second round)
12. (Czechoslovakia) Regina Rajchrtová (second round)
13. (Hungary) Andrea Temesvári (first round)
14. (France) Isabelle Demongeot (third round)
15. (United States) Terry Phelps (third round)
16. (United States) Kathy Rinaldi (third round)

== Draw ==
=== Key ===
- Q = Qualifier
- WC = Wild card
- LL = Lucky loser
- Alt = Alternate
- SE = Special exempt
- PR = Protected ranking
- ITF = ITF entry
- JE = Junior exempt
- w/o = Walkover
- r = Retired
- d = Defaulted
- SR = Special ranking

=== Finals ===
Quarterfinals
1	(Czechoslovakia) Helena Suková	3	4
6	(Soviet Union) Natasha Zvereva	6	6
(Netherlands) Brenda Schultz	7	6
(Australia) Kristin Godridge	5	3
(Australia) Rachel McQuillan	6	6
(Japan) Kimiko Date	0	4
10	(Austria) Judith Wiesner	7	6
2	(Czechoslovakia) Jana Novotná	6	3

Semifinals
6	(Soviet Union) Natasha Zvereva	6	6
(Netherlands) Brenda Schultz	4	1
(Australia) Rachel McQuillan	6	7
10	(Austria) Judith Wiesner	3	6

Final
6	(Soviet Union) Natasha Zvereva	6	6
(Australia) Rachel McQuillan	4	0

=== Top half ===
==== Section 1 ====
First round
(West Germany) C Porwik	6	4
(Czechoslovakia) P Langrová	7	6
(Australia) R Stubbs	4	7	6
(West Germany) E Pfaff	6	6	3
(Australia) L Field	4	3
14	(France) I Demongeot	6	6
9	(Australia) A Minter	6	3	3
(Japan) E Inoue	4	6	6
(South Africa) D Van Rensburg	6	3	6
(Japan) A Kijimuta	3	6	3
(France) K Quentrec	2	3
(Netherlands) N Jagerman	6	6

Second round
1	(Czechoslovakia) H Suková	6	6
(Czechoslovakia) P Langrová	3	4
(Australia) R Stubbs	6	3
14	(France) I Demongeot	7	6
(Japan) E Inoue	7	6
(South Africa) D Van Rensburg	6	3
(Netherlands) N Jagerman	2	4
6	(Soviet Union) N Zvereva	6	6

Third round
1	(Czechoslovakia) H Suková	6	4	6
14	(France) I Demongeot	2	6	2
(Japan) E Inoue	5	4
6	(Soviet Union) N Zvereva	7	6

Quarterfinals
1	(Czechoslovakia) H Suková	3	4
6	(Soviet Union) N Zvereva	6	6

==== Section 2 ====
First round
(Netherlands) B Schultz	7	6
(United States) C MacGregor	5	3
(Japan) Y Koizumi	2	0
(Japan) M Kidowaki	6	6
(France) P Etchemendy	4	0
16	(United States) K Rinaldi	6	6
12	(Czechoslovakia) R Rajchrtová	3	6	6
(Socialist Federal Republic of Yugoslavia) S Goleš	6	4	3
(Australia) K Godridge	7	2	7
(United States) K Shin	5	6	5
(Australia) D Balestrat	6	5	6
(Austria) U Priller	1	7	7

Second round
(Australia) K Radford	6	3	3
(Netherlands) B Schultz	4	6	6
(Japan) M Kidowaki	2	6	4
16	(United States) K Rinaldi	6	4	6
12	(Czechoslovakia) R Rajchrtová	6	2	0
(Australia) K Godridge	4	6	6
(Austria) U Priller	2	3
8	(Czechoslovakia) R Zrubáková	6	6

Third round
(Netherlands) B Schultz	7	6
16	(United States) K Rinaldi	5	1
(Australia) K Godridge	6	7
8	(Czechoslovakia) R Zrubáková	1	5

Quarterfinals
(Netherlands) B Schultz	7	6
(Australia) K Godridge	5	3

=== Bottom half ===
==== Section 3 ====
First round
(United States) S Martin	1	6	7
(United States) R Reis	6	2	5
(Australia) E Smylie	6	2	6
(Switzerland) C Cohen	3	6	4
(Australia) R McQuillan	6	6
13	(Hungary) A Temesvári	1	1
15	(United States) T Phelps	6	6
(Australia) A Henricksson	3	4
(United States) E Burgin	6	6
(Japan) N Miyagi	0	4
(Japan) K Date	6	2	7
(Italy) F Bonsignori	4	6	5

Second round
5	(Austria) B Paulus	3	6	3
(United States) S Martin	6	3	6
(Australia) E Smylie	1	6	1
(Australia) R McQuillan	6	3	6
15	(United States) T Phelps	6	6
(United States) E Burgin	2	2
(Japan) K Date	6	6
4	(South Africa) R Fairbank	4	3

Third round
(United States) S Martin	1	4
(Australia) R McQuillan	6	6
15	(United States) T Phelps	1	2
(Japan) K Date	6	6

Quarterfinals
(Australia) R McQuillan	6	6
(Japan) K Date	0	4

==== Section 4 ====
First round
(United States) A Grossman	5	6	1
(Czechoslovakia) E Švíglerová	7	0	6
(Czechoslovakia) J Pospíšilová	0	3
(United States) C Cunningham	6	6
(Australia) N Provis	6	2
10	(Austria) J Wiesner	7	6
11	(Netherlands) M Bollegraf	5	7	6
(France) P Paradis	7	6	1
(Australia) M Jaggard	7	6
(France) C Tanvier	5	1
(United States) M Werdel	3	4
(France) N Herreman	6	6

Second round
7	(United States) P Fendick	3	7	7
(Czechoslovakia) E Švíglerová	6	5	5
(United States) C Cunningham	2	6	4
10	(Austria) J Wiesner	6	2	6
11	(Netherlands) M Bollegraf	2	6	3
(Australia) M Jaggard	6	4	6
(France) N Herreman	3	5
2	(Czechoslovakia) J Novotná	6	7

Third round
7	(United States) P Fendick	2	3
10	(Austria) J Wiesner	6	6
(Australia) M Jaggard	3	0
2	(Czechoslovakia) J Novotná	6	6

Quarterfinals
10	(Austria) J Wiesner	7	6
2	(Czechoslovakia) J Novotná	6	3
