= 1990 Danone Hardcourt Championships =

- Date: 1–7 January
- Edition: 4th
- Category: Tier IV
- Draw: 56S / 28D
- Prize money: $150,000
- Surface: Hard / outdoor
- Location: Brisbane, Australia
- Venue: Milton Tennis Centre

Champions

Singles
- (Soviet Union) Natasha Zvereva

Doubles
- (Czechoslovakia) Jana Novotná / (Czechoslovakia) Helena Suková
- Danone Hardcourt Championships

The 1990 Danone Hardcourt Championships was a women's tennis tournament played on outdoor hard courts at the Milton Tennis Centre in Brisbane in Australia and was part of the Tier IV category of the 1990 WTA Tour. It was the fourth edition of the tournament and was held from 1 January through 7 January 1990. Sixth-seeded Natasha Zvereva won the singles title.

== Finals ==
=== Singles ===
(Soviet Union) Natasha Zvereva defeated (Australia) Rachel McQuillan 6–4, 6–0

- It was Zvereva's first singles title of her career.

=== Doubles ===
(Czechoslovakia) Jana Novotná / (Czechoslovakia) Helena Suková defeated (Australia) Hana Mandlíková / (United States) Pam Shriver 6–3, 6–1

- It was Novotná's 1st doubles title of the year and the 15th of her career. It was Suková's 1st doubles title of the year and the 32nd of her career.

== See also ==
- 1990 Queensland Open – men's tournament
