= 1988 Ariadne Classic – Doubles =

Doubles
- 1988 Ariadne Classic
- 1987 Champions: (Czechoslovakia) Hana Mandlíková (Australia) Wendy Turnbull

Final
- Champions: (United States) Betsy Nagelsen (United States) Pam Shriver
- Runners-up: (West Germany) Claudia Kohde-Kilsch (Czechoslovakia) Helena Suková
- Score: 2–6, 7–5, 6–2

Events
Singles	Doubles
← 1987 ·	Ariadne Classic	· 1989 →

Hana Mandlíková and Wendy Turnbull were the defending champions but they competed with different partners that year, Mandlíková with Jana Novotná and Turnbull with Elizabeth Smylie.

Mandlíková and Novotná lost in the quarterfinals to Jo Durie and Sharon Walsh-Pete.

Smylie and Turnbull lost in the semifinals to Claudia Kohde-Kilsch and Helena Suková.

Betsy Nagelsen and Pam Shriver won in the final 2–6, 7–5, 6–2 against Kohde-Kilsch and Suková.

== Seeds ==
Champion seeds are indicated in bold text while text in italics indicates the round in which those seeds were eliminated. The top four seeded teams received byes into the second round.

1. (West Germany) Claudia Kohde-Kilsch / (Czechoslovakia) Helena Suková (final)
2. (United States) **Betsy Nagelsen** / (United States) **Pam Shriver (champions)**
3. (Australia) Elizabeth Smylie / (Australia) Wendy Turnbull (semifinals)
4. (Czechoslovakia) Hana Mandlíková / (Czechoslovakia) Jana Novotná (quarterfinals)
5. (South Africa) Rosalyn Fairbank / (United States) Candy Reynolds (first round)
6. (Australia) Jenny Byrne / (Australia) Janine Tremelling (second round)
7. (France) Catherine Suire / (France) Catherine Tanvier (quarterfinals)
8. (United Kingdom) Jo Durie / (United States) Sharon Walsh-Pete (semifinals)

== Draw ==
=== Key ===
- Q = Qualifier
- WC = Wild card
- LL = Lucky loser
- Alt = Alternate
- SE = Special exempt
- PR = Protected ranking
- ITF = ITF entry
- JE = Junior exempt
- w/o = Walkover
- r = Retired
- d = Defaulted
- SR = Special ranking

=== Final ===
Final
1	(West Germany) Claudia Kohde-Kilsch (Czechoslovakia) Helena Suková	**6**	5	2
2	(United States) **Betsy Nagelsen** (United States) **Pam Shriver**	2	**7**	**6**

=== Top half ===
First round
(Netherlands) N Jagerman (United States) J Kaplan	4	2
(Australia) **M Jaggard** (Australia) **A Minter**	**6**	**6**
(Belgium) A Devries (Sweden) M Lindström	1	0
(United States) **P Fendick** (Canada) **J Hetherington**	**6**	**6**
(Australia) B Potter (Australia) K Radford	2	4
7	(France) **C Suire** (France) **C Tanvier**	**6**	**6**
(Australia) **K McDonald** (United States) **E Smith**	**6**	**6**
(Switzerland) E Krapl (Czechoslovakia) R Zrubáková	2	1
(Australia) **D Balestrat** (Australia) **N Provis**	**7**	**6**
(Australia) L O'Neill (Japan) N Sato	5	0
(Netherlands) **C Bakkum** (Netherlands) **H Witvoet**	**6**	**6**
5	(South Africa) R Fairbank (United States) C Reynolds	4	2

Second round
1	(West Germany) **C Kohde-Kilsch** (Czechoslovakia) **H Suková**	**6**	**6**
(Australia) M Jaggard (Australia) A Minter	4	2
(United States) P Fendick (Canada) J Hetherington	1	0
7	(France) **C Suire** (France) **C Tanvier**	**6**	**6**
3	(Australia) **E Smylie** (Australia) **W Turnbull**	**6**	**6**
(Australia) K McDonald (United States) E Smith	1	0
(Australia) **D Balestrat** (Australia) **N Provis**	**7**	**6**
(Netherlands) C Bakkum (Netherlands) H Witvoet	5	2

Quarterfinals
1	(West Germany) **C Kohde-Kilsch** (Czechoslovakia) **H Suková**	5	**7**	**6**
7	(France) C Suire (France) C Tanvier	**7**	6	4
3	(Australia) **E Smylie** (Australia) **W Turnbull**	6	**6**	**6**
(Australia) D Balestrat (Australia) N Provis	**7**	1	4

Semifinals
1	(West Germany) **C Kohde-Kilsch** (Czechoslovakia) **H Suková**	**7**
3	(Australia) E Smylie (Australia) W Turnbull	6	r

=== Bottom half ===
First round
8	(United Kingdom) **J Durie** (United States) **S Walsh-Pete**	**6**	**6**
(United States) H Ludloff (Australia) E Minter	3	1
(Netherlands) **M Bollegraf** (Switzerland) **C Jolissaint**	**6**	**6**
(West Germany) C Porwik (West Germany) W Probst	2	3
(Hong Kong) **P Hy** (Japan) **E Inoue**	**6**	**7**
(United States) D-A Hansel (United States) P Smith	3	5
6	(Australia) **J Byrne** (Australia) **J Tremelling**	**6**	**6**
(United States) A M Fernandez (Australia) L Field	1	4
(France) J Halard (France) P Paradis	**6**	4	5
(New Zealand) **B Cordwell** (New Zealand) **J Richardson**	4	**6**	**7**
(United States) S Collins (West Germany) S Hanika	**6**	6	1
(United Kingdom) **J Salmon** (Japan) **M Yanagi**	4	**7**	**6**

Second round
8	(United Kingdom) **J Durie** (United States) **S Walsh-Pete**	**7**	**6**
(Netherlands) M Bollegraf (Switzerland) C Jolissaint	6	3
(Hong Kong) P Hy (Japan) E Inoue	**7**	4	2
4	(Czechoslovakia) **H Mandlíková** (Czechoslovakia) **J Novotná**	5	**6**	**6**
6	(Australia) J Byrne (Australia) J Tremelling	**6**	2	6
(New Zealand) **B Cordwell** (New Zealand) **J Richardson**	2	**6**	**7**
(United Kingdom) J Salmon (Japan) M Yanagi	0	0
2	(United States) **B Nagelsen** (United States) **P Shriver**	**6**	**6**

Quarterfinals
8	(United Kingdom) **J Durie** (United States) **S Walsh-Pete**	3	**6**	**6**
4	(Czechoslovakia) H Mandlíková (Czechoslovakia) J Novotná	**6**	0	3
(New Zealand) B Cordwell (New Zealand) J Richardson	2	4
2	(United States) **B Nagelsen** (United States) **P Shriver**	**6**	**6**

Semifinals
8	(United Kingdom) J Durie (United States) S Walsh-Pete	4	2
2	(United States) **B Nagelsen** (United States) **P Shriver**	**6**	**6**
