= 1984 National Panasonic Open =

- Date: 19–25 November
- Edition: 5th
- Category: Category 1
- Draw: 56S / 32D
- Prize money: $150,000
- Surface: Grass / outdoor
- Location: Brisbane, Australia

Champions

Singles
- (Czechoslovakia) Helena Suková

Doubles
- (United States) Martina Navratilova / (United States) Pam Shriver
← 1983 ·	National Panasonic Open	· 1985 →

The 1984 National Panasonic Open was a women's tennis tournament played on outdoor grass courts in Brisbane, Australia that was part of the Category 1 tier of the 1984 Virginia Slims World Championship Series. It was the fifth edition of the tournament and was held from 19 through 25 November 1984. Third-seeded Helena Suková won the singles title.

== Finals ==
=== Singles ===
(Czechoslovakia) Helena Suková defeated (Australia) Elizabeth Smylie 6–4, 6–4

- It was Suková's 1st singles title of the year and the 2nd of her career.

=== Doubles ===
(United States) Martina Navratilova / (United States) Pam Shriver defeated (West Germany) Bettina Bunge / (West Germany) Eva Pfaff 6–3, 6–2

- It was Navratilova's 23rd title of the year and the 202nd of her career. It was Shriver's 13th title of the year and the 62nd of her career.
