= 1990 Queensland Open =

Tennis tournament

- Date: 24–30 September
- Edition: 88th
- Category: World Series
- Draw: 32S / 16D
- Prize money: $225,000
- Surface: Hard / outdoor
- Location: Brisbane, Australia
- Venue: Milton Tennis Courts

Champions

Singles
- (United States) Brad Gilbert

Doubles
- (Australia) Jason Stoltenberg / (Australia) Todd Woodbridge
← 1989 ·	Queensland Open	· 1991 →

The 1990 Queensland Open, also known as the Queensland Indoor or by its sponsored name the Commonwealth Bank Queensland Open, was a men's tennis tournament played on outdoor hard courts at the Milton Tennis Courts in Brisbane, Australia and was part of the World Series tier of the 1990 ATP Tour. It was the 88th edition of the tournament and was held from 24 September until 30 September 1990. First-seeded Brad Gilbert won the singles title.

== Finals ==
=== Singles ===
(United States) Brad Gilbert defeated (United States) Aaron Krickstein 6–3, 6–1

- It was Gilbert's 3rd and last singles title of the year and the 20th and last of his career.

=== Doubles ===
(Australia) Jason Stoltenberg / (Australia) Todd Woodbridge defeated (United States) Brian Garrow / (Australia) Mark Woodforde 2–6, 6–4, 6–4

- It was Stoltenberg's 3rd and last doubles title of the year and the 3rd of his career. It was Woodbridge's 2nd and last doubles title of the year and the 2nd of his career.

== See also ==
- 1990 Danone Hardcourt Championships – women's tournament
