= Harding Frew =

Australian civil engineer

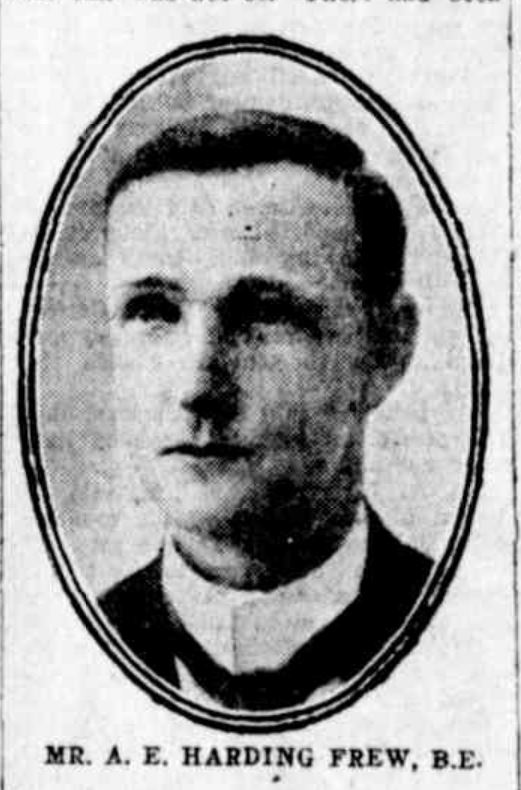
Harding Frew, 1926

Alison Eavis Harding Frew (1883–1952), known professionally as "Harding Frew", was an Australian civil engineer primarily concerned with engineering projects in Queensland, his home state.

== Early life ==
Alison Eavis Harding Frew was born in 1883 in Roma, Queensland, the son of Robert Dickson Alison Frew (a civil engineer) and his wife Elizabeth Constance (née Harding). He was educated at Brisbane Grammar School and University of Sydney.

He married his cousin Beatrice Doris Harding in St John's Anglican Cathedral in Brisbane on Wednesday 13 September 1911.

== Engineering career ==
Harding Frew began his career in the Queensland Railways Department in 1908. In 1911, he established a private practice where he focussed on municipal projects such as:

- wharves
- bridges
- electricity supplies
- water and sewerage services

He consulted to over 100 local government authorities in Queensland in addition to work in New South Wales and Victoria.

== Projects ==
Harding Frew built over 80 bridges throughout Queensland, including:

- William Jolly Bridge, Brisbane
- Julibee Bridge, Innisfail
- Granville Bridge, Maryborough
- Caboolture Bridge
- Hornibrook Bridge
- Redcliffe Jetty
- Innisfail City Plan

Outside of Queensland, he was involved in the construction of:

- Pyrmount Power House, Sydney
- Armidale Electricity System

He was responsible for water supply projects in:

- Atherton
- Emerald
- Mitchell
- Mackay

== William Jolly Bridge ==
This is his most notable project. Erected as a series of bow-string sections it was either the fourth or sixth crossing of the river in Brisbane. Built of concrete sprayed steel, (gunite), a Swiss system, and completed in 1932, it was renamed from the Grey Street Bridge to the William Jolly Bridge, in 1955, after an erstwhile Lord Mayor of Brisbane.

== Later life ==
Harding Frew died at his home in Adamson Street, Eagle Junction on 4 July 1952; he was 69 years old.
