= 1988 Ariadne Classic – Singles =

Singles
- 1988 Ariadne Classic
- 1987 Champion: (Czechoslovakia) Hana Mandlíková

Final
- Champion: (United States) Pam Shriver
- Runner-up: (Czechoslovakia) Jana Novotná
- Score: 7–6, 7–6

Events
Singles	Doubles
- Ariadne Classic

Hana Mandlíková was the defending champion but did not compete that year.

Pam Shriver won in the final 7–6, 7–6 against Jana Novotná.

== Seeds ==
A champion seed is indicated in bold text while text in italics indicates the round in which that seed was eliminated. The top eight seeds received a bye to the second round.

1. (United States) **Pam Shriver (champion)**
2. (Czechoslovakia) Helena Suková (second round)
3. (West Germany) Claudia Kohde-Kilsch (semifinals)
4. (West Germany) Sylvia Hanika (quarterfinals)
5. (Australia) Dianne Balestrat (third round)
6. (Australia) Wendy Turnbull (third round)
7. (Australia) Elizabeth Smylie (third round)
8. (Japan) Etsuko Inoue (second round)
9. (South Africa) Rosalyn Fairbank (second round)
10. (Australia) Anne Minter (first round)
11. (Czechoslovakia) Jana Novotná (final)
12. (United States) Betsy Nagelsen (second round)
13. (France) Julie Halard (third round)
14. (United Kingdom) Jo Durie (second round)
15. n/a
16. n/a

== Draw ==
Key

- Q = Qualifier
- WC = Wild card
- LL = Lucky loser
- Alt = Alternate
- ITF = ITF entry
- PR = Protected ranking
- SR = Special ranking
- SE = Special exempt
- JE = Junior exempt
- JR = Junior Accelerator Programme entrant
- CO = College Accelerator Programme entrant
- NG = Next Gen Accelerator Program entrant
- w/o = Walkover
- r = Retired
- d = Defaulted

=== Finals ===
Semifinals
1	(United States) **Pam Shriver**	**6**	**6**
3	(West Germany) Claudia Kohde-Kilsch	4	0
11	(Czechoslovakia) **Jana Novotná**	**7**	**6**
(United States) Patty Fendick	5	1

Final
1	(United States) **Pam Shriver**	**7**	**7**
11	(Czechoslovakia) Jana Novotná	6	6

=== Top half ===
==== Section 1 ====
First round
(New Zealand) **J Richardson**	**6**	**6**
LL	(United States) D-A Hansel	2	0
(Czechoslovakia) **R Zrubáková**	**6**	**6**
(Netherlands) H ter Riet	3	3
(New Zealand) **B Cordwell**	**6**	**6**
10	(Australia) A Minter	3	3
12	(United States) **B Nagelsen**	**7**	**7**
(Sweden) M Lindström	6	6
Q	(United Kingdom) V Lake	4	1
(West Germany) **C Porwik**	**6**	**6**
(Switzerland) C Jolissaint	2	4
(Belgium) **A Devries**	**6**	**6**

Second round
1	(United States) **P Shriver**	4	**6**	**6**
(New Zealand) J Richardson	**6**	1	0
(Czechoslovakia) **R Zrubáková**	3	**6**	**7**
(New Zealand) B Cordwell	**6**	2	5
12	(United States) B Nagelsen	6	6
(West Germany) **C Porwik**	**7**	**7**
(Belgium) A Devries	2	3
5	(Australia) **D Balestrat**	**6**	**6**

Third round
1	(United States) **P Shriver**	**6**	**6**
(Czechoslovakia) R Zrubáková	3	2
(West Germany) **C Porwik**	**6**	**6**
5	(Australia) D Balestrat	3	2

Quarterfinals
1	(United States) **P Shriver**	**6**	**6**
(West Germany) C Porwik	2	2

==== Section 2 ====
First round
(Belgium) S Wasserman	**6**	4	5
(United States) **A M Fernandez**	4	**6**	**7**
Q	(Australia) T Morton	2	3
Q	(Japan) **E Okagawa**	**6**	**6**
(West Germany) W Probst	4	0
(Australia) **N Provis**	**6**	**6**
14	(United Kingdom) **J Durie**	**6**	**6**
(Australia) S McCann	1	2
(Netherlands) **M Bollegraf**	**6**	**6**
(Australia) L Field	3	1
(Australia) M Jaggard	4	4
(France) **C Suire**	**6**	**6**

Second round
3	(West Germany) **C Kohde-Kilsch**	**6**	**6**
(United States) A M Fernandez	3	1
Q	(Japan) E Okagawa	1	4
(Australia) **N Provis**	**6**	**6**
14	(United Kingdom) J Durie	1	4
(Netherlands) **M Bollegraf**	**6**	**6**
(France) C Suire	1	**6**	2
7	(Australia) **E Smylie**	**6**	3	**6**

Third round
3	(West Germany) **C Kohde-Kilsch**	5	**6**	**7**
(Australia) N Provis	**7**	3	5
(Netherlands) **M Bollegraf**	**6**	**6**
7	(Australia) E Smylie	1	1

Quarterfinals
3	(West Germany) **C Kohde-Kilsch**	**6**	5	**6**
(Netherlands) M Bollegraf	2	**7**	2

=== Bottom half ===
==== Section 3 ====
First round
Q	(United Kingdom) J Salmon	5	6
(United States) **T Mochizuki**	**7**	**7**
(Australia) R McQuillan	0	3
(France) **A Dechaume**	**6**	**6**
Q	(Australia) A Scott	**6**	4	6
11	(Czechoslovakia) **J Novotná**	0	**6**	**7**
13	(France) **J Halard**	**6**	**6**
(Australia) J Byrne	1	1
(Australia) **E Minter**	**6**	**6**
(France) E Derly	1	3
Q	(United States) C Reynolds	3	3
(United States) **H Ludloff**	**6**	**6**

Second round
6	(Australia) **W Turnbull**	1	**6**	**6**
(United States) T Mochizuki	**6**	1	2
(France) A Dechaume	3	1
11	(Czechoslovakia) **J Novotná**	**6**	**6**
13	(France) **J Halard**	2	**7**	**7**
(Australia) E Minter	**6**	5	5
(United States) H Ludloff	2	**6**	6
4	(West Germany) **S Hanika**	**6**	3	**7**

Third round
6	(Australia) W Turnbull	**6**	1	2
11	(Czechoslovakia) **J Novotná**	4	**6**	**6**
13	(France) J Halard	0	6
4	(West Germany) **S Hanika**	**6**	**7**

Quarterfinals
11	(Czechoslovakia) **J Novotná**	**7**	**6**
4	(West Germany) S Hanika	6	1

==== Section 4 ====
First round
Q	(Canada) **J Hetherington**	**6**	4	**6**
(United States) S Walsh-Pete	3	**6**	2
(France) C Tanvier	5	3
(United States) **P Fendick**	**7**	**6**
(Hong Kong) P Hy	4	4
9	(South Africa) **R Fairbank**	**6**	**6**
Q	(Japan) **M Yanagi**	**7**	**6**
(Switzerland) E Krapl	5	2
(Netherlands) B Schultz	**6**	4	3
(Australia) **J Tremelling**	0	**6**	**6**
(France) **P Paradis**	**6**	**6**
(Australia) K-A Guse	2	0

Second round
8	(Japan) E Inoue	6	3
Q	(Canada) **J Hetherington**	**7**	**6**
(United States) **P Fendick**	**7**	**6**
9	(South Africa) R Fairbank	6	1
Q	(Japan) **M Yanagi**	3	**6**	**6**
(Australia) J Tremelling	**6**	4	3
(France) **P Paradis**	**6**	**6**
2	(Czechoslovakia) H Suková	4	3

Third round
Q	(Canada) J Hetherington	3	1
(United States) **P Fendick**	**6**	**6**
Q	(Japan) M Yanagi	4	**6**	1
(France) **P Paradis**	**6**	3	**6**

Quarterfinals
(United States) **P Fendick**	3	**6**	**6**
(France) P Paradis	**6**	1	3
