= 1991 Danone Women's Open =

- Date: 31 December 1990 – 6 January 1991
- Edition: 5th
- Category: Tier IV
- Draw: 56S / 28D
- Prize money: $150,000
- Surface: Hard / outdoor
- Location: Brisbane, Australia
- Venue: Milton Tennis Centre

Champions

Singles
- (Czechoslovakia) Helena Suková

Doubles
- (United States) Gigi Fernández / (Czechoslovakia) Helena Suková
- Danone Hardcourt Championships

The 1991 Danone Women's Open was a women's tennis tournament played on outdoor hard courts at the Milton Tennis Centre in Brisbane in Australia and was part of the Tier IV category of the 1991 WTA Tour. It was the fifth edition of the tournament and was held from 31 December 1990 through 6 January 1991. Second-seeded Helena Suková won the singles title.

== Finals ==
=== Singles ===
(Czechoslovakia) Helena Suková defeated (Japan) Akiko Kijimuta 6–4, 6–3

- It was Suková's only singles title of the year and the 8th of her career.

=== Doubles ===
(United States) Gigi Fernández / (Czechoslovakia) Jana Novotná defeated (United States) Patty Fendick / (Czechoslovakia) Helena Suková 6–3, 6–1

- It was Fernández's 1st doubles title of the year and the 15th of her career. It was Novotná's 1st doubles title of the year and the 24th of her career.
