= 1988 Ariadne Classic =

- Date: 28 December 1987 – 3 January
- Edition: 2nd
- Category: Category 2
- Draw: 56S / 28D
- Prize money: $150,000
- Surface: Grass / outdoor
- Location: Brisbane, Australia
- Venue: Milton Tennis Centre

Champions

Singles
- (United States) Pam Shriver

Doubles
- (United States) Betsy Nagelsen / (United States) Pam Shriver
| ← 1987 · | Ariadne Classic | · 1989 → |

The 1988 Ariadne Classic was a women's tennis tournament played on grass courts at the Milton Tennis Centre in Brisbane, Australia and was part of the Category 2 tier of the 1988 WTA Tour. The tournament ran from 28 December 1987 through 3 January 1988. First-seeded Pam Shriver won the singles title.

== Finals ==
=== Singles ===
(United States) Pam Shriver defeated (Czechoslovakia) Jana Novotná 7–6^{(8–6)}, 7–6^{(7–4)}

- It was Shriver's 1st title of the year and the 104th of her career.

=== Doubles ===
(United States) Betsy Nagelsen / (United States) Pam Shriver defeated (West Germany) Claudia Kohde-Kilsch / (Czechoslovakia) Helena Suková 2–6, 7–5, 6–2

- It was Nagelsen's 1st title of the year and the 16th of her career. It was Shriver's 2nd title of the year and the 105th of her career.
