= Pam Shriver career statistics =

This is a list of the main career statistics of former professional tennis player Pam Shriver.

== Major finals ==
=== Grand Slams ===
==== Singles: 1 (0 titles, 1 runner–up) ====
| Result | Year | Championship | Surface | Opponent | Score |
|---|---|---|---|---|---|
| Loss | 1978 | US Open | Hard | (United States) Chris Evert | 5–7, 4–6 |

==== Doubles: 27 (21 titles, 6 runners-up) ====
| Result | Year | Championship | Surface | Partner | Opponents | Score |
|---|---|---|---|---|---|---|
| Loss | 1980 | US Open | Hard | (Netherlands) Betty Stöve | (United States) Billie Jean King (United States) Martina Navratilova | 6–7, 5–7 |
| Win | 1981 | Wimbledon | Grass | (United States) Martina Navratilova | (United States) Kathy Jordan (United States) Anne Smith | 6–3, 7–6^{(8–6)} |
| Loss | 1981 | Australian Open | Grass | (United States) Martina Navratilova | (United States) Kathy Jordan (United States) Anne Smith | 2–6, 5–7 |
| Win | 1982 | Wimbledon | Grass | (United States) Martina Navratilova | (United States) Kathy Jordan (United States) Anne Smith | 6–4, 6–1 |
| Win | 1982 | Australian Open | Grass | (United States) Martina Navratilova | (West Germany) Claudia Kohde-Kilsch (West Germany) Eva Pfaff | 6–4, 6–2 |
| Win | 1983 | Wimbledon | Grass | (United States) Martina Navratilova | (United States) Rosemary Casals (Australia) Wendy Turnbull | 6–2, 6–2 |
| Win | 1983 | US Open | Hard | (United States) Martina Navratilova | (South Africa) Rosalyn Fairbank (United States) Candy Reynolds | 6–7^{(4–7)}, 6–1, 6–3 |
| Win | 1983 | Australian Open | Grass | (United States) Martina Navratilova | (United Kingdom) Anne Hobbs (Australia) Wendy Turnbull | 6–4, 6–7, 6–2 |
| Win | 1984 | French Open | Clay | (United States) Martina Navratilova | (West Germany) Claudia Kohde-Kilsch (Czechoslovakia) Hana Mandlíková | 5–7, 6–3, 6–2 |
| Win | 1984 | Wimbledon | Grass | (United States) Martina Navratilova | (United States) Kathy Jordan (United States) Anne Smith | 6–3, 6–4 |
| Win | 1984 | US Open | Hard | (United States) Martina Navratilova | (United Kingdom) Anne Hobbs (Australia) Wendy Turnball | 6–2, 6–4 |
| Win | 1984 | Australian Open | Grass | (United States) Martina Navratilova | (West Germany) Claudia Kohde-Kilsch (Czechoslovakia) Helena Suková | 6–3, 6–4 |
| Win | 1985 | French Open | Clay | (United States) Martina Navratilova | (West Germany) Claudia Kohde-Kilsch (West Germany) Eva Pfaff | 4–6, 6–2, 6–2 |
| Loss | 1985 | Wimbledon | Grass | (United States) Martina Navratilova | (United States) Kathy Jordan (Australia) Elizabeth Smylie | 7–5, 3–6, 4–6 |
| Loss | 1985 | US Open | Hard | (United States) Martina Navratilova | (West Germany) Claudia Kohde-Kilsch (Czechoslovakia) Helena Suková | 6–7^{(5–7)}, 6–2, 6–3 |
| Win | 1985 | Australian Open | Grass | (United States) Martina Navratilova | (West Germany) Claudia Kohde-Kilsch (Czechoslovakia) Helena Suková | 6–3, 6–4 |
| Win | 1986 | Wimbledon | Grass | (United States) Martina Navratilova | (Czechoslovakia) Hana Mandlíková (Australia) Wendy Turnbull | 6–1, 6–3 |
| Win | 1986 | US Open | Hard | (United States) Martina Navratilova | (Czechoslovakia) Hana Mandlíková (Australia) Wendy Turnbull | 5–7, 6–3, 6–2 |
| Win | 1987 | Australian Open | Grass | (United States) Martina Navratilova | (United States) Zina Garrison (United States) Lori McNeil | 6–1, 6–0 |
| Win | 1987 | French Open | Clay | (United States) Martina Navratilova | (West Germany) Steffi Graf (Argentina) Gabriela Sabatini | 6–2, 6–1 |
| Win | 1987 | US Open | Hard | (United States) Martina Navratilova | (United States) Kathy Jordan (Australia) Elizabeth Smylie | 5–7, 6–4, 6–2 |
| Win | 1988 | Australian Open | Hard | (United States) Martina Navratilova | (United States) Chris Evert (Australia) Wendy Turnbull | 6–0, 7–5 |
| Win | 1988 | French Open | Clay | (United States) Martina Navratilova | (West Germany) Claudia Kohde-Kilsch (Czechoslovakia) Helena Suková | 6–2, 7–5 |
| Win | 1989 | Australian Open | Hard | (United States) Martina Navratilova | (United States) Patty Fendick (Canada) Jill Hetherington | 3–6, 6–3, 6–2 |
| Loss | 1989 | US Open | Hard | (United States) Mary Joe Fernández | (Australia) Hana Mandlíková (United States) Martina Navratilova | 7–5, 4–6, 4–6 |
| Win | 1991 | US Open | Hard | (Belarus) Natasha Zvereva | (Czechoslovakia) Jana Novotná (Latvia) Larisa Savchenko | 6–4, 4–6, 7–6^{(7–5)} |
| Loss | 1993 | Australian Open | Hard | (Australia) Elizabeth Smylie | (United States) Gigi Fernández (Belarus) Natasha Zvereva | 4–6, 3–6 |

==== Mixed doubles: 1 (1 title, 0 runners-up) ====
| Result | Year | Championship | Surface | Partner | Opponents | Score |
|---|---|---|---|---|---|---|
| Win | 1987 | French Open | Clay | (Spain) Emilio Sánchez | (United States) Lori McNeil (United States) Sherwood Stewart | 6–3, 7–6^{(7–4)} |

=== Olympics ===
==== Women's doubles: 1 (1 gold medal) ====
| Result | Year | Location | Surface | Partner | Opponents | Score |
|---|---|---|---|---|---|---|
| Gold | 1988 | Seoul | Hard | (United States) Zina Garrison | (Czechoslovakia) Jana Novotná (Czechoslovakia) Helena Suková | 4–6, 6–2, 10–8 |

=== Year-End Championships finals ===
==== Doubles: 10 (10 titles) ====
| Result | Year | Location | Surface | Partner | Opponents | Score |
|---|---|---|---|---|---|---|
| Win | 1981 | New York City | Carpet (i) | (United States) Martina Navratilova | (United States) Barbara Potter (United States) Sharon Walsh | 6–0, 7–6^{(8–6)} |
| Win | 1982 | New York City | Carpet (i) | (United States) Martina Navratilova | (United States) Kathy Jordan (United States) Anne Smith | 6–4, 6–3 |
| Win | 1983 | New York City | Carpet (i) | (United States) Martina Navratilova | (West Germany) Claudia Kohde-Kilsch (West Germany) Eva Pfaff | 7–5, 6–2 |
| Win | 1984 | New York City | Carpet (i) | (United States) Martina Navratilova | (United Kingdom) Jo Durie (United States) Ann Kiyomura | 6–3, 6–1 |
| Win | 1985 | New York City | Carpet (i) | (United States) Martina Navratilova | (West Germany) Claudia Kohde-Kilsch (Czechoslovakia) Helena Suková | 6–7^{(4–7)}, 6–4, 7–6^{(7–5)} |
| Win | 1986^{N} | New York City | Carpet (i) | (United States) Martina Navratilova | (West Germany) Claudia Kohde-Kilsch (Czechoslovakia) Helena Suková | 1–6, 6–1, 6–1 |
| Win | 1987 | New York City | Carpet (i) | (United States) Martina Navratilova | (West Germany) Claudia Kohde-Kilsch (Czechoslovakia) Helena Suková | 6–1, 6–1 |
| Win | 1988 | New York City | Carpet (i) | (United States) Martina Navratilova | (Soviet Union) Larisa Savchenko (Soviet Union) Natalia Zvereva | 6–3, 6–4 |
| Win | 1989 | New York City | Carpet (i) | (United States) Martina Navratilova | (Soviet Union) Larisa Savchenko (Soviet Union) Natalia Zvereva | 6–3, 6–2 |
| Win | 1991 | New York City | Carpet (i) | (United States) Martina Navratilova | (United States) Gigi Fernández (Czechoslovakia) Jana Novotná | 4–6, 7–5, 6–4 |

== Career finals ==
=== Singles:48 (21–27) ===
| Winner — Legend Grand Slam tournaments (0–1) WTA Tour Championships (0–1) Tier I (0–0) Tier II (0–1) Tier III (1–1) Tier IV (2–1) Tier V (1–1) Virginia Slims, Avon, other (17–21) | Titles by surface Hard (3–7) Grass (10–9) Clay (0–1) Carpet (8–10) |

| Result | W-L | Date | Tournament | Surface | Opponent | Score |
|---|---|---|---|---|---|---|
| Win | 1–0 | Jan 1978 | Columbus, US | Carpet (i) | (United States) Kate Latham | 6–1, 6–3 |
| Loss | 1–1 | Aug 1978 | US Open | Hard | (United States) Chris Evert | 5–7, 4–6 |
| Loss | 1–2 | Jun 1979 | Beckenham, UK | Grass | (Australia) Evonne Goolagong Cawley | 3–6, 2–6 |
| Win | 2–2 | Mar 1980 | Carlsbad, US | Hard (i) | (United States) Kate Latham | 6–1, 6–2 |
| Loss | 2–3 | Dec 1980 | Sydney, Australia | Grass | (Australia) Wendy Turnbull | 6–3, 4–6, 6–7^{(8–10)} |
| Loss | 2–4 | Mar 1981 | Dallas, US | Carpet (i) | (United States) Martina Navratilova | 2–6, 4–6 |
| Loss | 2–5 | Apr 1981 | Hilton Head Island, US | Clay | (United States) Chris Evert-Lloyd | 3–6, 2–6 |
| Loss | 2–6 | Jul 1981 | San Diego, US | Hard | (United States) Tracy Austin | 2–6, 7–5, 2–6 |
| Win | 3–6 | Nov 1981 | Perth, Australia | Grass | (United States) Andrea Jaeger | 6–1, 7–6^{(7–4)} |
| Loss | 3–7 | Feb 1982 | Houston, US | Hard | (West Germany) Bettina Bunge | 2–6, 6–3, 2–6 |
| Loss | 3–8 | Sep 1982 | Philadelphia, US | Carpet (i) | (United States) Barbara Potter | 4–6, 2–6 |
| Loss | 3–9 | Nov 1982 | Brisbane, Australia | Grass | (Australia) Wendy Turnbull | 3–6, 1–6 |
| Win | 4–9 | Apr 1983 | Atlanta, US | Hard | (United States) Kathy Jordan | 6–2, 6–0 |
| Loss | 4–10 | Oct 1983 | Tarpon Springs, US | Hard | (United States) Martina Navratilova | 3–6, 2–6 |
| Win | 5–10 | Nov 1983 | Brisbane, Australia | Grass | (Australia) Wendy Turnbull | 6–4, 7–5 |
| Win | 6–10 | Feb 1984 | Chicago, US | Carpet (i) | (United States) Barbara Potter | 6–3, 6–4 |
| Win | 7–10 | Jun 1984 | Birmingham, UK | Grass | (United States) Anne White | 7–6^{(7–2)}, 6–3 |
| Loss | 7–11 | Aug 1984 | Mahwah, US | Hard | (United States) Martina Navratilova | 4–6, 6–4, 5–7 |
| Win | 8–11 | May 1985 | Sydney, Australia | Carpet (i) | (Australia) Dianne Balestrat | 6–3, 6–3 |
| Win | 9–11 | May 1985 | Melbourne, Australia | Carpet (i) | (United States) Kathy Jordan | 6–4, 6–1 |
| Win | 10–11 | Jun 1985 | Birmingham, UK | Grass | (United States) Betsy Nagelsen | 6–1, 6–0 |
| Loss | 10–12 | Jul 1985 | Newport, US | Grass | (United States) Chris Evert-Lloyd | 6–4, 6–1 |
| Loss | 10–13 | Jul 1985 | Manhattan Beach, US | Hard | (West Germany) Claudia Kohde-Kilsch | 2–6, 4–6 |
| Loss | 10–14 | Sep 1985 | New Orleans, US | Carpet (i) | (United States) Chris Evert-Lloyd | 4–6, 5–7 |
| Win | 11–14 | Oct 1985 | Filderstadt, West Germany | Carpet (I) | (Sweden) Catarina Lindqvist | 6–1, 7–5 |
| Loss | 11–15 | Nov 1985 | Brisbane, Australia | Grass | (United States) Martina Navratilova | 3–6, 5–7 |
| Loss | 11–16 | Jan 1986 | Washington, US | Carpet (i) | (United States) Martina Navratilova | 1–6, 4–6 |
| Win | 12–16 | Jun 1986 | Birmingham, UK | Grass | (Bulgaria) Manuela Maleeva | 6–2, 7–6^{(7–0)} |
| Win | 13–16 | Jul 1986 | Newport, US | Grass | (United States) Lori McNeil | 6–4, 6–2 |
| Loss | 13–17 | Aug 1986 | Montreal, Canada | Hard | (Czechoslovakia) Helena Suková | 2–6, 5–7 |
| Loss | 13–18 | Sep 1986 | New Orleans, US | Carpet (–) | (United States) Martina Navratilova | 1–6, 6–4, 2–6 |
| Loss | 13–19 | Dec 1986 | Brisbane, Australia | Grass | (Czechoslovakia) Hana Mandlíková | 2–6, 6–2, 4–6 |
| Loss | 13–20 | Jan 1987 | Sydney, Australia | Grass | (United States) Zina Garrison | 2–6, 4–6 |
| Loss | 13–21 | Mar 1987 | Dallas, US | Carpet (i) | (United States) Chris Evert | 1–6, 3–6 |
| Win | 14–21 | Jun 1987 | Birmingham, UK | Grass | (Soviet Union) Larisa Savchenko | 4–6, 6–2, 6–2 |
| Win | 15–21 | Jul 1987 | Newport, US | Grass | (United States) Wendy White | 6–2, 6–4 |
| Win | 16–21 | Aug 1987 | Toronto, Canada | Hard | (United States) Zina Garrison | 6–4, 6–1 |
| Loss | 16–22 | Oct 1987 | Brighton, UK | Carpet (i) | (Argentina) Gabriela Sabatini | 5–7, 4–6 |
| Win | 17–22 | Nov 1987 | Worcester, US | Carpet (i) | (United States) Chris Evert | 6–4, 4–6, 6–0 |
| Win | 18–22 | Dec 1987 | Brisbane, Australia | Grass | (Czechoslovakia) Jana Novotná | 7–6^{(8–6)}, 7–6^{(7–4)} |
| Win | 19–22 | Jan 1988 | Sydney, Australia | Grass | (Czechoslovakia) Helena Suková | 6–2, 6–3 |
| Loss | 19–23 | Feb 1988 | Dallas, US | Carpet (i) | (United States) Martina Navratilova | 0–6, 3–6 |
| Loss | 19–24 | Feb 1988 | Fairfax, US | Carpet (i) | (United States) Martina Navratilova | 0–6, 2–6 |
| Win | 20–24 | Apr 1988 | Tokyo, Japan | Carpet (i) | (Czechoslovakia) Helena Suková | 7–5, 6–1 |
| Loss | 20–25 | Jun 1988 | Birmingham, UK | Grass | (United States) Claudia Kohde-Kilsch | 1–6, 2–6 |
| Win | 21–25 | Oct 1988 | Zürich, Switzerland | Carpet (i) | (Bulgaria) Manuela Maleeva | 6–3, 6–4 |
| Loss | 21–26 | Nov 1988 | Virginia Slims Championships, US | Carpet (i) | (Argentina) Gabriela Sabatini | 5–7, 2–6, 2–6 |
| Loss | 21–27 | Jul 1989 | Newport, US | Grass | (United States) Zina Garrison | 0–6, 1–6 |

=== Doubles (111) ===
Legend (Women's doubles)
Grand Slam tournaments (21)
WTA Tour Championship (10)
Olympic Gold (1)
Tier I (1)
Tier II (9)
Tier III (3)
Tier IV or V (4)
Virginia Slims, Avon, other (62)

| No. | Date | Tournament | Location | Surface | Partner | Opponents | Score |
|---|---|---|---|---|---|---|---|
| 1. | Jun 1978 | Chichester International (1) | Chichester, United Kingdom | Grass | (United States) Janet Newberry | (South Africa) Yvonne Vermaak (United Kingdom) Michelle Tyler | 3–6, 6–3, 6–4 |
| 2. | Jan 1980 | Avon Championships of Cincinnati | Cincinnati, Ohio, U.S. | Carpet | (United States) Laura duPont | (Socialist Federal Republic of Yugoslavia) Mima Jaušovec (United States) Ann Kiyomura Hayashi | 6–3, 6–3 |
| 3. | Mar 1980 | Honda Civic Classic | Carlsbad, California, U.S. | ? | (United States) Laura duPont | (United States) Rosemary Casals (United States) JoAnne Russell | 6–7, 6–4, 6–1 |
| 4. | Jun 1980 | Crossley Carpets Trophy (2) | Chichester, United Kingdom | Grass | (Netherlands) Betty Stöve | (United States) Rosemary Casals (Australia) Wendy Turnbull | 6–4, 7–5 |
| 5. | Jul 1980 | Player's Challenge Classic | Montreal | Hard | (United States) Anne Smith | (United States) Ann Kiyomura (South Africa) Greer Stevens | 6–3, 7–6(3) |
| 6. | Dec 1980 | Thunderbird Classic | Phoenix, Arizona, U.S. | Hard | (United States) Paula Smith | (United States) Candy Reynolds (United States) Ann Kiyomura | 6–0, 6–4 |
| 7. | Dec 1980 | New South Wales Open (1) | Sydney | Grass | (Netherlands) Betty Stöve | (United States) Rosemary Casals (Australia) Wendy Turnbull | 6–1, 4–6, 6–4 |
| 8. | Dec 1980 | National Panasonic Open | Adelaide, Australia | Grass | (Netherlands) Betty Stöve | (United Kingdom) Sue Barker (United States) Sharon Walsh | 6–4, 6–3 |
| 9. | Feb 1981 | Avon Championships of Chicago (1) | Chicago | Carpet | (United States) Martina Navratilova | (United States) Barbara Potter (United States) Sharon Walsh | 6–3, 6–4 |
| 10. | Mar 1981 | Avon Championships of Dallas (1) | Dallas, Texas, U.S. | Carpet | (United States) Martina Navratilova | (United States) Kathy Jordan (United States) Anne Smith | 7–5, 6–4 |
| 11. | Mar 1981 | Avon Championships (1) | New York City | Carpet | (United States) Martina Navratilova | (United States) Barbara Potter (United States) Sharon Walsh | 6–0, 7–6 |
| 12. | Apr 1981 | United Airlines Tournament (1) | Orlando, Florida, U.S. | Clay | (United States) Martina Navratilova | (United States) Rosemary Casals (Australia) Wendy Turnbull | 6–1, 7–6 |
| 13. | Jun 1981 | BMW Championships (1) | Eastbourne, United Kingdom | Grass | (United States) Martina Navratilova | (United States) Kathy Jordan (United States) Anne Smith | 6–7, 6–2, 6–1 |
| 14. | Jul 1981 | Wimbledon (1) | London | Grass | (United States) Martina Navratilova | (United States) Kathy Jordan (United States) Anne Smith | 6–3, 7–6 |
| 15. | Aug 1981 | Player's Canadian Open | Toronto | Hard | (United States) Martina Navratilova | (United States) Candy Reynolds (South Africa) Anne Smith | 7–6, 7–6 |
| 16. | Sep 1981 | U.S. Women's Indoor Championships (1) | Minneapolis, Minnesota, U.S. | Carpet | (United States) Martina Navratilova | (United States) Rosemary Casals (Australia) Wendy Turnbull | 6–3, 7–5 |
| 17. | Nov 1981 | New South Wales Open (2) | Sydney | Grass | (United States) Martina Navratilova | (United States) Kathy Jordan (United States) Anne Smith | 6–7, 6–2, 6–4 |
| 18. | Dec 1981 | Colgate Series Championships (1) | East Rutherford, New Jersey, U.S. | Carpet | (United States) Martina Navratilova | (United States) Rosemary Casals (Australia) Wendy Turnbull | 6–3, 6–4 |
| 19. | Jan 1982 | Avon Championships of Chicago (2) | Chicago | Carpet | (United States) Martina Navratilova | (United States) Rosemary Casals (Australia) Wendy Turnbull | 7–5, 6–4 |
| 20. | Feb 1982 | Avon Championship of Houston (1) | Houston, Texas, U.S. | Carpet | (United States) Martina Navratilova | (United Kingdom) Sue Barker (United States) Sharon Walsh | 7–6, 6–2 |
| 21. | Mar 1982 | Avon Championships of Dallas (2) | Dallas, Texas, U.S. | Carpet | (United States) Martina Navratilova | (United States) Billie Jean King (South Africa) Ilana Kloss | 6–4, 6–4 |
| 22. | Mar 1982 | Avon Championships (2) | New York City | Carpet | (United States) Martina Navratilova | (United States) Kathy Jordan (United States) Anne Smith | 6–4, 6–3 |
| 23. | Apr 1982 | Family Circle Cup (1) | Hilton Head, South Carolina, U.S. | Clay | (United States) Martina Navratilova | (United States) JoAnne Russell (Romania) Virginia Ruzici | 6–1, 6–2 |
| 24. | Apr 1982 | Bridgestone Doubles Championship (1) | Fort Worth, Texas, U.S. | Clay | (United States) Martina Navratilova | (United States) Kathy Jordan (United States) Anne Smith | 7–5, 6–3 |
| 25. | Jun 1982 | BMW Championships (1) | Eastbourne, United Kingdom | Grass | (United States) Martina Navratilova | (United States) Kathy Jordan (United States) Anne Smith | 6–3, 6–4 |
| 26. | Jul 1982 | Wimbledon (2) | London | Grass | (United States) Martina Navratilova | (United States) Kathy Jordan (United States) Anne Smith | 7–5, 6–1 |
| 27. | Oct 1982 | Porsche Tennis Grand Prix (1) | Filderstadt, West Germany | Carpet | (United States) Martina Navratilova | (United States) Candy Reynolds (United States) Anne Smith | 6–2, 6–3 |
| 28. | Oct 1982 | Daihatsu Challenge (1) | Brighton, United Kingdom | Carpet | (United States) Martina Navratilova | (United States) Barbara Potter (United States) Sharon Walsh | 2–6, 7–5, 6–4 |
| 29. | Nov 1982 | New South Wales Open (3) | Sydney | Grass | (United States) Martina Navratilova | (West Germany) Claudia Kohde-Kilsch (West Germany) Eva Pfaff | 6–2, 2–6, 7–6 |
| 30. | Nov 1982 | Australian Open (1) | Melbourne | Grass | (United States) Martina Navratilova | (West Germany) Claudia Kohde-Kilsch (West Germany) Eva Pfaff | 6–4, 6–2 |
| 31. | Dec 1982 | Toyota Championships (2) | East Rutherford, New Jersey, U.S. | Carpet | (United States) Martina Navratilova | (United States) Candy Reynolds (United States) Paula Smith | 6–4, 7–5 |
| 32. | Jan 1983 | Virginia Slims of Washington (1) | Washington, D.C. | Carpet | (United States) Martina Navratilova | (United States) Kathy Jordan (United States) Anne Smith | 4–6, 7–5, 6–3 |
| 33. | Jan 1983 | Virginia Slims of Houston (2) | Houston, Texas, U.S. | Carpet | (United States) Martina Navratilova | (United States) Barbara Potter (United Kingdom) Jo Durie | 6–4, 6–3 |
| 34. | Feb 1983 | Virginia Slims of Chicago (3) | Chicago | Carpet | (United States) Martina Navratilova | (United States) Kathy Jordan (United States) Anne Smith | 6–1, 6–2 |
| 35. | Mar 1983 | Virginia Slims of Dallas (3) | Dallas, Texas, U.S. | Carpet | (United States) Martina Navratilova | (United States) Rosemary Casals (Australia) Wendy Turnbull | 6–3, 6–2 |
| 36. | Mar 1983 | Virginia Slims; Championships (3) | New York City | Carpet | (United States) Martina Navratilova | (West Germany) Claudia Kohde-Kilsch (West Germany) Eva Pfaff | 7–5, 6–2 |
| 37. | Jun 1983 | BMW Championships (2) | Eastbourne, United Kingdom | Grass | (United States) Martina Navratilova | (United Kingdom) Jo Durie (United Kingdom) Anne Hobbs | 6–1, 6–0 |
| 38. | Jul 1983 | Wimbledon (3) | London | Grass | (United States) Martina Navratilova | (United States) Rosemary Casals (Australia) Wendy Turnbull | 6–2, 6–2 |
| 39. | Jul 1983 | Virginia Slims Hall of Fame Classic | Newport, Rhode Island, U.S. | Grass | (United States) Barbara Potter | (United States) Barbara Jordan (Australia) Elizabeth Sayers Smylie | 6–3, 6–1 |
| 40. | Aug 1983 | Virginia Slims of Los Angeles (1) | Los Angeles | Hard | (United States) Martina Navratilova | (United States) Betsy Nagelsen (Romania) Virginia Ruzici | 6–1, 6–0 |
| 41. | Sep 1983 | US Open (1) | New York City | Hard | (United States) Martina Navratilova | (United States) Candy Reynolds (South Africa) Rosalyn Fairbank Nideffer | 6–7, 6–1, 6–3 |
| 42. | Oct 1983 | Eckerd Open | Tampa, Florida, U.S. | Hard | (United States) Martina Navratilova | (United States) Bonnie Gadusek (United States) Wendy White Prausa | 6–0, 6–1 |
| 43. | Oct 1983 | Daihatsu Challenge (2) | Brighton, United Kingdom | Carpet | (United States) Chris Evert | (United Kingdom) Jo Durie (United States) Ann Kiyomura Hayashi | 7–5, 6–3 |
| 44. | Dec 1983 | Australian Open (2) | Melbourne | Grass | (United States) Martina Navratilova | (United Kingdom) Anne Hobbs (Australia) Wendy Turnbull | 6–4, 6–7, 6–2 |
| 45. | Jan 1984 | Virginia Slims of California | Oakland, California, U.S. | Carpet | (United States) Martina Navratilova | (United States) Rosemary Casals (United States) Alycia Moulton | 6–2, 6–3 |
| 46. | Feb 1984 | U.S. Women's Indoor Championships (2) | East Hanover, New Jersey, U.S. | Carpet | (United States) Martina Navratilova | (United Kingdom) Jo Durie (United States) Ann Kiyomura Hayashi | 6–4, 6–3 |
| 47. | Mar 1984 | Virginia Slims Championships (4) | New York City | Carpet | (United States) Martina Navratilova | (United Kingdom) Jo Durie (United States) Ann Kiyomura Hayashi | 6–3, 6–1 |
| 48. | Mar 1984 | Bridgestone Doubles Championship (2) | Tokyo | Carpet | (United States) Ann Kiyomura Hayashi | (United States) Barbara Jordan (Australia) Elizabeth Sayers Smylie | 6–3, 6–7(7), 6–3 |
| 49. | Jun 1984 | French Open (1) | Paris | Clay | (United States) Martina Navratilova | (West Germany) Claudia Kohde-Kilsch (Czechoslovakia) Hana Mandlíková | 5–7, 6–3, 6–2 |
| 50. | Jun 1984 | Eastbourne (3) | Eastbourne, United Kingdom | Grass | (United States) Martina Navratilova | (United Kingdom) Jo Durie (United States) Ann Kiyomura Hayashi | 6–4, 6–2 |
| 51. | Jul 1984 | Wimbledon (4) | London | Grass | (United States) Martina Navratilova | (United States) Kathy Jordan (United States) Anne Smith | 6–3, 6–4 |
| 52. | Aug 1984 | United Jersey Bank Open (1) | Mahwah, New Jersey, U.S. | Hard | (United States) Martina Navratilova | (United Kingdom) Jo Durie (United States) Ann Kiyomura Hayashi | 7–6(3), 3–6, 6–2 |
| 53. | Sep 1984 | US Open (2) | New York City | Hard | (United States) Martina Navratilova | (United Kingdom) Anne Hobbs (Australia) Wendy Turnbull | 6–2, 6–4 |
| 54. | Sep 1984 | Virginia Slims of New Orleans | New Orleans, Louisiana, U.S. | Carpet | (United States) Martina Navratilova | (United States) Sharon Walsh (Australia) Wendy Turnbull | 6–4, 6–1 |
| 55. | Nov 1984 | National Panasonic Open (1) | Brisbane, Australia | Grass | (United States) Martina Navratilova | (West Germany) Bettina Bunge (West Germany) Eva Pfaff | 6–3, 6–2 |
| 56. | Dec 1984 | Australian Open (3) | Melbourne | Grass | (United States) Martina Navratilova | (West Germany) Claudia Kohde-Kilsch (Czechoslovakia) Helena Suková | 6–3, 6–4 |
| 57. | Mar 1985 | U.S. Women's Indoor Championships (3) | Princeton, New Jersey, U.S. | Carpet | (United States) Martina Navratilova | (Netherlands) Marcella Mesker (Australia) Elizabeth Sayers Smylie | 7–5, 6–2 |
| 58. | Mar 1985 | Virginia Slims Championships (5) | New York City | Carpet | (United States) Martina Navratilova | (West Germany) Claudia Kohde-Kilsch (Czechoslovakia) Helena Suková | 6–7(4), 6–4, 7–6(5) |
| 59. | Apr 1985 | Family Circle Cup (2) | Hilton Head, South Carolina, U.S. | Clay | (South Africa) Rosalyn Fairbank | (Soviet Union) Svetlana Parkhomenko (Soviet Union) Larisa Savchenko Neiland | 6–4, 6–1 |
| 60. | Apr 1985 | Chrysler Tournament of Champions (2) | Orlando, Florida, U.S. | Clay | (United States) Martina Navratilova | (United States) Elise Burgin (United States) Kathleen Horvath | 6–3, 6–1 |
| 61. | May 1985 | Australian Indoor | Sydney | Carpet | (Australia) Elizabeth Sayers Smylie | (United States) Barbara Potter (United States) Sharon Walsh | 7–5, 7–5 |
| 62. | May 1985 | Melbourne Indoors | Melbourne, Australia | Carpet | (Australia) Elizabeth Sayers Smylie | (United States) Kathy Jordan (United Kingdom) Anne Hobbs | 6–2, 5–7, 6–1 |
| 63. | Jun 1985 | French Open (2) | Paris | Clay | (United States) Martina Navratilova | (West Germany) Claudia Kohde-Kilsch (Czechoslovakia) Helena Suková | 4–6, 6–2, 6–2 |
| 64. | Jun 1985 | Eastbourne (4) | Eastbourne, United Kingdom | Grass | (United States) Martina Navratilova | (United States) Kathy Jordan (Australia) Elizabeth Sayers Smylie | 7–5, 6–4 |
| 65. | Oct 1985 | Porsche Tennis Grand Prix (2) | Filderstadt, West Germany | Carpet | (Czechoslovakia) Hana Mandlíková | (Sweden) Carina Karlsson (Denmark) Tine Scheuer-Larsen | 6–2, 6–1 |
| 66. | Nov 1985 | National Panasonic Open (2) | Brisbane, Australia | Grass | (United States) Martina Navratilova | (West Germany) Claudia Kohde-Kilsch (Czechoslovakia) Helena Suková | 6–4, 6–7(6), 6–1 |
| 67. | Dec 1985 | Australian Open (4) | Melbourne | Grass | (United States) Martina Navratilova | (West Germany) Claudia Kohde-Kilsch (Czechoslovakia) Helena Suková | 6–3, 6–4 |
| 68. | Jan 1986 | Virginia Slims of Washington (2) | Washington, D.C. | Carpet | (United States) Martina Navratilova | (West Germany) Claudia Kohde-Kilsch (Czechoslovakia) Helena Suková | 6–3, 6–4 |
| 69. | Jan 1986 | Virginia Slims of New England (1) | Worcester, Massachusetts, U.S. | Carpet | (United States) Martina Navratilova | (West Germany) Claudia Kohde-Kilsch (Czechoslovakia) Helena Suková | 6–3, 6–4 |
| 70. | Feb 1986 | Virginia Slims of Florida | Key Biscayne, Florida, U.S. | Hard | (Czechoslovakia) Helena Suková | (United States) Chris Evert (Australia) Wendy Turnbull | 6–2, 6–3 |
| 71. | Mar 1986 | Bridgestone Doubles Championship (3) | Nashville, Tennessee, U.S. | Carpet | (United States) Barbara Potter | (United States) Kathy Jordan (Australia) Elizabeth Sayers Smylie | 6–4, 6–3 |
| 72. | Jun 1986 | Pilkington Glass Championships (5) | Eastbourne, United Kingdom | Grass | (United States) Martina Navratilova | (West Germany) Claudia Kohde-Kilsch (Czechoslovakia) Helena Suková | 6–2, 6–4 |
| 73. | Jul 1986 | Wimbledon (5) | London | Grass | (United States) Martina Navratilova | (Czechoslovakia) Hana Mandlíková (Australia) Wendy Turnbull | 6–1, 6–3 |
| 74. | Aug 1986 | Virginia Slims of Los Angeles (2) | Los Angeles | Hard | (United States) Martina Navratilova | (West Germany) Claudia Kohde-Kilsch (Czechoslovakia) Helena Suková | 6–4, 6–3 |
| 75. | Sep 1986 | US Open (3) | New York City | Hard | (United States) Martina Navratilova | (Czechoslovakia) Hana Mandlíková (Australia) Wendy Turnbull | 6–4, 3–6, 6–3 |
| 76. | Oct 1986 | Porsche Tennis Grand Prix (3) | Filderstadt, West Germany | Carpet | (United States) Martina Navratilova | (United States) Zina Garrison (Argentina) Gabriela Sabatini | 7–6(5), 6–4 |
| 77. | Nov 1986 | Virginia Slims of New England (2) | Worcester, Massachusetts, U.S. | Carpet | (United States) Martina Navratilova | (West Germany) Claudia Kohde-Kilsch (Czechoslovakia) Helena Suková | 7–5, 6–3 |
| 78. | Nov 1986 | Virginia Slims Championships (6) | New York City | Carpet | (United States) Martina Navratilova | (West Germany) Claudia Kohde-Kilsch (Czechoslovakia) Helena Suková | 7–6(1), 6–3 |
| 79. | Jan 1987 | Australian Open (5) | Melbourne | Grass | (United States) Martina Navratilova | (United States) Zina Garrison (United States) Lori McNeil | 6–1, 6–0 |
| 80. | Mar 1987 | Lipton International; Players Championships | Key Biscayne, Florida, U.S. | Hard | (United States) Martina Navratilova | (West Germany) Claudia Kohde-Kilsch (Czechoslovakia) Helena Suková | 6–3, 7–6(6) |
| 81. | Mar 1987 | Virginia Slims of Washington (3) | Washington, D.C. | Carpet | (United States) Elise Burgin | (United States) Zina Garrison (United States) Lori McNeil | 6–1, 3–6, 6–4 |
| 82. | Jun 1987 | French Open (3) | Paris | Clay | (United States) Martina Navratilova | (West Germany) Steffi Graf (Argentina) Gabriela Sabatini | 6–2, 6–1 |
| 83. | Aug 1987 | Virginia Slims of Los Angeles (3) | Los Angeles | Hard | (United States) Martina Navratilova | (United States) Zina Garrison (United States) Lori McNeil | 6–3, 6–4 |
| 84. | Sep 1987 | US Open (4) | New York City | Hard | (United States) Martina Navratilova | (United States) Kathy Jordan (Australia) Elizabeth Sayers Smylie | 5–7, 6–4, 6–2 |
| 85. | Oct 1987 | Porsche Tennis Grand Prix (4) | Filderstadt, West Germany | Carpet | (United States) Martina Navratilova | (United States) Zina Garrison (United States) Lori McNeil | 6–1, 6–2 |
| 86. | Nov 1987 | Virginia Slims Championships (7) | New York City | Carpet | (United States) Martina Navratilova | (West Germany) Claudia Kohde-Kilsch (Czechoslovakia) Helena Suková | 6–1, 6–1 |
| 87. | Jan 1988 | Ariadne Classic (3) | Brisbane, Australia | Grass | (United States) Betsy Nagelsen | (West Germany) Claudia Kohde-Kilsch (Czechoslovakia) Helena Suková | 2–6, 7–5, 6–2 |
| 88. | Jan 1988 | Australian Open (6) | Melbourne | Hard | (United States) Martina Navratilova | (United States) Chris Evert (Australia) Wendy Turnbull | 6–0, 7–5 |
| 89. | Feb 1988 | Virginia Slims of Washington (4) | Fairfax, Virginia, U.S. | Carpet | (United States) Martina Navratilova | (Czechoslovakia) Helena Suková (Argentina) Gabriela Sabatini | 6–3, 6–4 |
| 90. | May 1988 | Pan Pacific Open (1) | Tokyo | Carpet | (Czechoslovakia) Helena Suková | (United States) Gigi Fernández (United States) Robin White | 4–6, 6–2, 7–6(5) |
| 91. | Jun 1988 | French Open (4) | Paris | Clay | (United States) Martina Navratilova | (West Germany) Claudia Kohde-Kilsch (Czechoslovakia) Helena Suková | 6–2, 7–5 |
| 92. | Oct 1988 | Olympic Games | Seoul, South Korea | Hard | (United States) Zina Garrison | (Czechoslovakia) Jana Novotná (Czechoslovakia) Helena Suková | 4–6, 6–2, 10–8 |
| 93. | Nov 1988 | Virginia Slims of New England (3) | Worcester, Massachusetts, U.S. | Carpet | (United States) Martina Navratilova | (Czechoslovakia) Helena Suková (Argentina) Gabriela Sabatini | 6–3, 3–6, 7–5 |
| 94. | Nov 1988 | Virginia Slims Championships (8) | New York City | Carpet | (United States) Martina Navratilova | (Soviet Union) Larisa Savchenko Neiland (Soviet Union) Natasha Zvereva | 6–3, 6–4 |
| 95. | Jan 1989 | New South Wales Open (4) | Sydney | Hard | (United States) Martina Navratilova | (Australia) Elizabeth Sayers Smylie (Australia) Wendy Turnbull | 6–3, 6–3 |
| 96. | Jan 1989 | Australian Open (7) | Melbourne | Hard | (United States) Martina Navratilova | (United States) Patty Fendick (United States) Jill Hetherington | 3–6, 6–3, 6–2 |
| 97. | Feb 1989 | Virginia Slims of Washington (5) | Fairfax, Virginia, U.S. | Carpet | (United States) Betsy Nagelsen | (Soviet Union) Larisa Savchenko Neiland (Soviet Union) Natasha Zvereva | 6–2, 6–3 |
| 98. | Mar 1989 | U.S. Women's Hardcourt Championships (1) | San Antonio, Texas, U.S. | Hard | (United States) Katrina Adams | (United States) Patty Fendick (United States) Jill Hetherington | 3–6, 6–1, 6–4 |
| 99. | Mar 1989 | Virginia Slims of Indian Wells | Indian Wells, California, U.S. | Hard | (Australia) Hana Mandlíková | (South Africa) Rosalyn Fairbank Nideffer (United States) Gretchen Magers | 6–3, 6–7(4), 6–3 |
| 100. | Aug 1989 | United Jersey Bank Classic (2) | Mahwah, New Jersey, U.S. | Hard | (West Germany) Steffi Graf | (United States) Louise Allen (Peru) Laura Arraya | 6–2, 6–4 |
| 101. | Nov 1989 | Virginia Slims of New England (4) | Worcester, Massachusetts, U.S. | Carpet | (United States) Martina Navratilova | (Czechoslovakia) Elise Burgin (South Africa) Rosalyn Fairbank Nideffer | 6–4, 4–6, 6–4 |
| 102. | Nov 1989 | Virginia Slims Championships (9) | New York City | Carpet | (United States) Martina Navratilova | (Soviet Union) Larisa Savchenko Neiland (Soviet Union) Natasha Zvereva | 6–3, 6–2 |
| 103. | Sep 1991 | US Open (5) | New York City | Hard | (Soviet Union) Natasha Zvereva | (Czechoslovakia) Jana Novotná (Soviet Union) Larisa Savchenko Neiland | 6–4, 4–6, 7–6^{(7–5)} |
| 104. | Sep 1991 | Nichirei International Championships | Tokyo | Hard | (United States) Mary Jo Fernandez | (United States) Carrie Cunningham (Peru) Laura Arraya | 6–3, 6–3 |
| 105. | Oct 1991 | Midland Bank Championships (3) | Brighton, United Kingdom | Carpet | (Soviet Union) Natasha Zvereva | (United States) Zina Garrison (United States) Lori McNeil | 6–1, 6–2 |
| 106. | Nov 1991 | Virginia Slims Championships (10) | New York City | Carpet | (United States) Martina Navratilova | (United States) Gigi Fernández (Czechoslovakia) Jana Novotná | 4–6, 7–5, 6–4 |
| 107. | Feb 1992 | Virginia Slims of Chicago (4) | Chicago | Carpet | (United States) Martina Navratilova | (United States) Katrina Adams (United States) Zina Garrison | 6–4, 7–6^{(9–7)} |
| 108. | Mar 1992 | U.S. Women's Hardcourt Championships (2) | San Antonio, Texas, U.S. | Hard | (United States) Martina Navratilova | (United States) Patty Fendick (United States) Andrea Strnadová | 3–6, 6–2, 7–6^{(7–4)} |
| 109. | Jan 1993 | Peters New South Wales Open (5) | Sydney | Hard | (Australia) Elizabeth Sayers Smylie | (United States) Lori McNeil (Australia) Rennae Stubbs | 7–6^{(7–4)}, 6–2 |
| 110. | Feb 1994 | Toray Pan Pacific Open (2) | Tokyo | Carpet | (Australia) Elizabeth Sayers Smylie | (United States) Martina Navratilova (Netherlands) Manon Bollegraf | 6–3, 3–6, 7–6^{(7–3)} |
| 111. | Jul 1994 | U.S. Women's Hardcourt Championships (3) | Stratton Mountain, Vermont, U.S. | Hard | (Australia) Elizabeth Sayers Smylie | (Spain) Conchita Martínez (Spain) Arantxa Sánchez Vicario | 7–6^{(7–4)}, 2–6, 7–5 |

=== Mixed doubles (1) ===
| Result | W/L | Date | Tournament | Surface | Partner | Opponents | Score |
|---|---|---|---|---|---|---|---|
| Win | 1–0 | Jun 1987 | French Open, Paris | Clay | (Spain) Emilio Sánchez Vicario | (United States) Lori McNeil (United States) Sherwood Stewart | 6–3, 7–6^{(7–4)} |

== Grand Slam performance timelines ==
Key
| W | F | SF | QF | #R | RR | Q# | DNQ | A | NH |

(W) winner; (F) finalist; (SF) semifinalist; (QF) quarterfinalist; (#R) rounds 4, 3, 2, 1; (RR) round-robin stage; (Q#) qualification round; (DNQ) did not qualify; (A) absent; (NH) not held; (SR) strike rate (events won / competed); (W–L) win–loss record.

=== Singles ===
| Tournament | 1978 | 1979 | 1980 | 1981 | 1982 | 1983 | 1984 | 1985 | 1986 | 1987 | 1988 | 1989 | 1990 | 1991 | 1992 | 1993 | 1994 | 1995 | 1996 | 1997 | Career SR |
|---|---|---|---|---|---|---|---|---|---|---|---|---|---|---|---|---|---|---|---|---|---|
| Australian Open | A | A | QF | SF | SF | SF | QF | 3R | NH | QF | 4R | 3R | 3R | 3R | 3R | 1R | 2R | 1R | 1R | A | 0 / 16 |
| French Open | A | A | A | A | A | 3R | A | A | A | A | A | A | A | A | A | A | 1R | A | A | A | 0 / 2 |
| Wimbledon | 3R | 2R | 4R | SF | 4R | 2R | QF | QF | 1R | SF | SF | 3R | A | 3R | 2R | A | 3R | 1R | 2R | A | 0 / 17 |
| US Open | F | 1R | QF | 4R | SF | SF | QF | QF | QF | QF | 2R | 1R | A | 3R | 2R | 1R | 2R | 2R | 1R | A | 0 / 18 |
| SR | 0 / 2 | 0 / 2 | 0 / 3 | 0 / 3 | 0 / 3 | 0 / 4 | 0 / 3 | 0 / 3 | 0 / 2 | 0 / 3 | 0 / 3 | 0 / 3 | 0 / 1 | 0 / 3 | 0 / 3 | 0 / 2 | 0 / 4 | 0 / 3 | 0 / 3 | 0 / 0 | 0 / 53 |
Career Statistics
| Year-end ranking | 13 | 33 | 9 | 7 | 6 | 5 | 4 | 4 | 6 | 4 | 5 | 17 | 66 | 37 | 31 | 38 | 63 | 110 | 189 | | |

=== Doubles ===
| Tournament | 1978 | 1979 | 1980 | 1981 | 1982 | 1983 | 1984 | 1985 | 1986 | 1987 | 1988 | 1989 | 1990 | 1991 | 1992 | 1993 | 1994 | 1995 | 1996 | 1997 | Career SR |
|---|---|---|---|---|---|---|---|---|---|---|---|---|---|---|---|---|---|---|---|---|---|
| Australian Open | A | A | QF | F | W | W | W | W | NH | W | W | W | 1R | 2R | SF | F | SF | 2R | 1R | 1R | 7 / 16 |
| French Open | A | A | A | A | A | A | W | W | A | W | W | A | A | A | A | 2R | 2R | A | A | A | 4 / 6 |
| Wimbledon | 1R | A | QF | W | W | W | W | F | W | QF | 3R | SF | A | SF | SF | SF | QF | QF | 3R | 1R | 5 / 16 |
| US Open | SF | 3R | F | SF | SF | W | W | F | W | W | SF | F | A | W | SF | 3R | 3R | QF | 1R | A | 5 / 15 |
| SR | 0 / 0 | 0 / 0 | 0 / 1 | 1 / 2 | 2 / 3 | 3 / 3 | 4 / 4 | 2 / 4 | 2 / 2 | 3 / 4 | 2 / 4 | 1 / 3 | 0 / 1 | 1 / 3 | 0 / 3 | 0 / 4 | 0 / 4 | 0 / 3 | 0 / 3 | 0 / 2 | 21 / 53 |
Career Statistics
| Year-end ranking | | | | | | | 2 | 1 | 2 | 2 | 2 | 4 | 92 | 9 | 7 | 7 | 12 | 18 | 91 | 249 | |
