= 1980 National Panasonic South Australian Open =

Tennis tournament

- Date: 8–14 December
- Edition: 1st
- Category: Colgate Series (AAA)
- Draw: 56S / 28D
- Prize money: $125,000
- Surface: Grass / outdoor
- Location: Adelaide, Australia
- Venue: Memorial Drive

Champions

Singles
- (Czechoslovakia) Hana Mandlíková

Doubles
- (United States) Pam Shriver / (Netherlands) Betty Stöve
- National Panasonic Open

The 1980 National Panasonic South Australian Open, also known as the National Panasonic Women's Open, was a women's tennis tournament played on outdoor grass courts at the Memorial Drive in Adelaide, Australia that was part of the category AAA of the Colgate Series of the 1980 WTA Tour. It was the inaugural edition of the National Panasonic Open and was held from 8 December through 14 December 1980. First-seeded Hana Mandlíková won the singles title and earned $22,000 first-prize money.

== Finals ==
=== Singles ===
(Czechoslovakia) Hana Mandlíková defeated (United Kingdom) Sue Barker 6–2, 6–4

- It was Mandlíková's 6th singles title of the year and the 13th of her career.

=== Doubles ===
(United States) Pam Shriver / (Netherlands) Betty Stöve defeated (United Kingdom) Sue Barker / (United States) Sharon Walsh 6–4, 6–3

== Prize money ==
Event	W	F	SF	QF	Round of 16	Round of 32	Round of 64
Singles	$22,000	$11,000	$5,875	$2,800	$1,400	$700	$350
