= Robert Dickson Alison Frew =

Robert Dickson Alison Frew (died 1930) was a civil engineer and tennis enthusiast in Queensland, Australia. He was also involved in local government.

== Tennis ==
Robert Frew was the president of the Queensland Lawn Tennis Association from 1910 to 1930. He was the driving force behind the creation of the Milton Tennis Centre in Milton, Brisbane. The Milton Tennis Centre closed in 1999 because of heavy financial losses by Tennis Queensland. In 2014, the site was redeveloped as Frew Park, a combined park and tennis centre. Frew Park was opened on 29 November 2014 and is named after Robert Frew.

== Local government ==
Robert Frew served on the Sherwood Divisional Board.

== Personal life ==
Robert Frew was educated at Scots College, Melbourne.

Aged 23 years old, Robert Frew married widow Elizabeth Constance Brown (née Harding) in Queensland on 26 July 1882. They were the parents of engineer Harding Frew, best known as the engineer of the William Jolly Bridge in Brisbane.

Robert Frew died suddenly from a seizure at Valhalla, Balfour Road, East Bellvue Hill, Sydney on Thursday 20 November 1930 aged 71 years. He had retired to Sydney a few months before his death. He played tennis up until his death. He was buried in Sherwood Anglican Cemetery in Sherwood, Brisbane on Monday 24 November 1930.
