= Robert Frew (bookseller) =

British bookseller

Robert Frew (born 1951) is an antiquarian bookseller, founder of Robert Frew Ltd, a past president of the Antiquarian Booksellers Association (2005–2007) and a former chairman of the London International Antiquarian Book Fair (2009–2010), Britain's premier antiquarian book fair held annually at the Olympia Exhibition Centre, London. Frew is also the founder of London-based shipping and logistics company RF Shipping.

== History ==
Frew has been trading in antiquarian books since 1975, starting out from an open market in Camden Lock. Frew later had shops in Primrose Hill, Great Russell Street Bloomsbury, Maddox Street Mayfair and now on the borders of South Kensington & Knightsbridge. The firm specialises in travel literature, illustrated books, maps and atlases and literature. The firm exhibits at most of the major International League of Antiquarian Booksellers fairs in America, often in Europe and sometimes in the Middle and Far East. Robert Frew Ltd are also members of the Provincial Booksellers Fairs Association (PBFA), and regularly exhibit at the organisation's fairs in London and occasionally in the provinces. For 10 years, 1986 to 1996, Frew was manager of the monthly London PBFA book fairs at the Hotel Russell.

RF Shipping and Logistics was founded by Frew in 2005. The company began servicing the auction clearance requirements of Robert Frew Ltd's colleagues in the book trade, and now packs and ships all manner of goods worldwide. Shipments handled by RF Shipping include the transferral of a large archive of material by author Fay Weldon from Weldon's Dorset home to the Lilly Library in Bloomington, Indiana, and the transportation of Arthur C. Clarke's collection of aerospace models from the West Country to Sri Lanka.
