= National Panasonic Open =

Defunct tennis tournament
- Event name: National Panasonic Open
- Tour: WTA Tour
- Founded: 1980
- Abolished: 1985
- Editions: 6
- Location: Adelaide (1980); Perth (1981); Brisbane (1982–1985)
- Surface: Grass

The National Panasonic Open is a defunct WTA Tour affiliated women's tennis tournament played in Australia from 1980 to 1985. It was held at Adelaide in 1980, at Perth in 1981, and at the Milton Tennis Centre in Brisbane from 1982 to 1985. The tournament was played on grass courts.

== Finals ==
=== Singles ===
Year	Champions	Runners-up	Score
1980	(Czechoslovakia) Hana Mandlíková	(United Kingdom) Sue Barker	6–2, 6–4
1981	(United States) Pam Shriver	(United States) Andrea Jaeger	6–1, 7–6^{(7–4)}
1982	(Australia) Wendy Turnbull	(United States) Pam Shriver	6–3, 6–1
1983	(United States) Pam Shriver	(Australia) Wendy Turnbull	6–4, 7–5
1984	(Czechoslovakia) Helena Suková	(Australia) Elizabeth Smylie	6–4, 6–4
1985	(United States) Martina Navratilova	(United States) Pam Shriver	6–3, 7–5

=== Doubles ===
Year	Champions	Runners-up	Score
1980	(United States) Pam Shriver (Netherlands) Betty Stöve	(United Kingdom) Sue Barker (United States) Sharon Walsh	6–4, 6–3
1981	(United States) Barbara Potter (United States) Sharon Walsh	(United States) Betsy Nagelsen (United States) Candy Reynolds	6–4, 6–2
1982	(United States) Billie Jean King (United States) Anne Smith	(West Germany) Claudia Kohde-Kilsch (West Germany) Eva Pfaff	6–3, 6–4
1983	(United Kingdom) Anne Hobbs (Australia) Wendy Turnbull	(United States) Pam Shriver (United States) Sharon Walsh	6–3, 6–4
1984	(United States) Martina Navratilova (United States) Pam Shriver	(West Germany) Bettina Bunge (West Germany) Eva Pfaff	6–3, 6–2
1985	(United States) Martina Navratilova (United States) Pam Shriver	(West Germany) Claudia Kohde-Kilsch (Czechoslovakia) Helena Suková	6–4, 6–7^{(6–8)}, 6–1
