= Milton Courts =

Australian tennis venue

Coordinates: 27.4695°S 153.0006°E

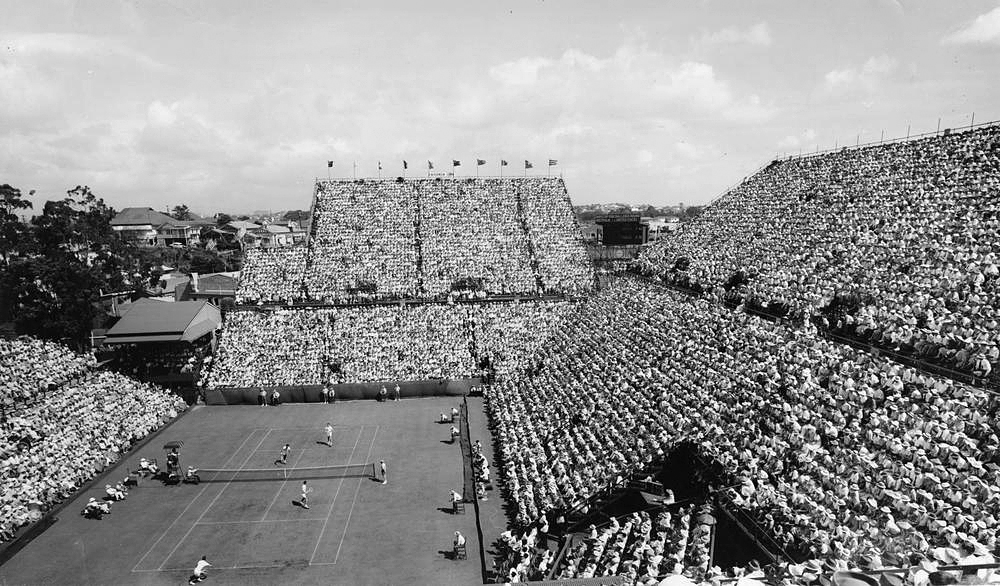
1958 Davis Cup, being played at Milton Courts

Milton Courts (now Frew Park) was a tennis venue located in Milton, Brisbane, Australia. The complex consisted of 19 hard courts and four grass courts. The main arena seated 7,000 people and opened in 1915. Robert Dickson Alison Frew was the president of the Queensland Lawn Tennis Association (later Tennis Queensland) from 1910 to 1930. He was the driving force behind the creation of the tennis centre.

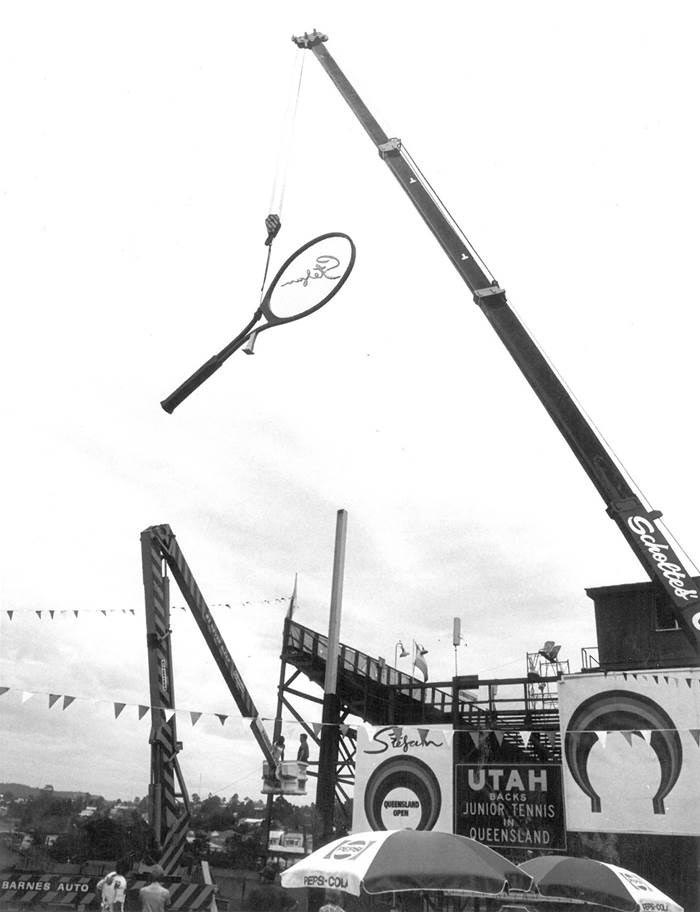
The Stefan Racquet, being removed from the Milton Tennis Centre, circa 1999

It hosted eight Australian Open/Championships, including the first tournament where professionals were allowed in 1969. In addition, it staged three Davis Cup finals in 1958, 1962, and 1967.

The rock band The Rolling Stones performed at the venue during their 1973 Pacific Tour on 14 February 1973.

The venue closed in 1999 because of heavy financial losses by Tennis Queensland. The land was sold in 2002, and the complex demolished.

In 2014, the site was redeveloped by the Brisbane City Council as Frew Park, a combined park and tennis centre. Frew Park was opened on 29 November 2014, and it is named after Robert Frew. Frew Park is made up of Roy Emerson Tennis Courts, Wendy Turnbull Green, and the Fay Muller Rebound Wall. It is a key part of the Brisbane Tennis Trail.

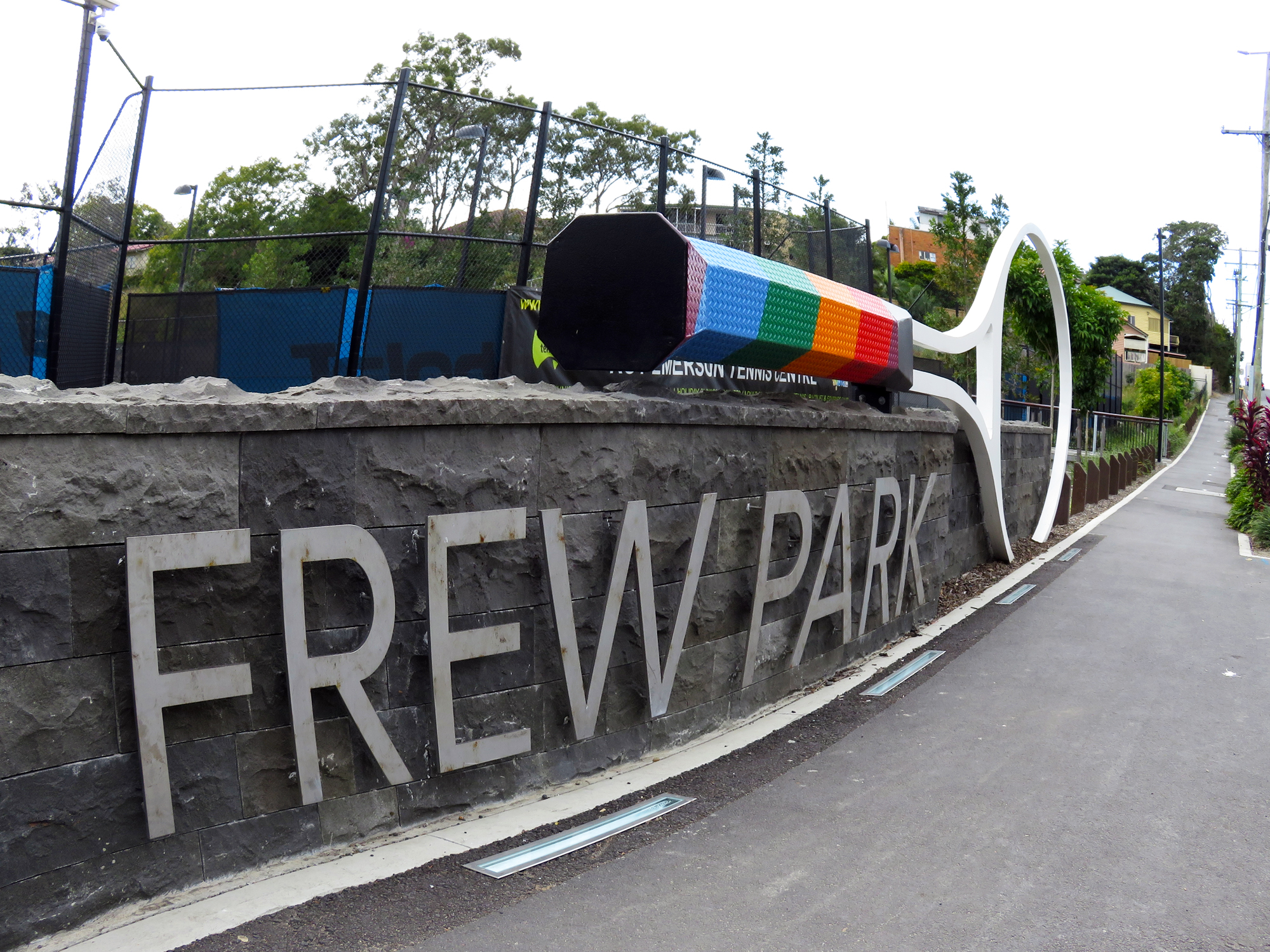
The Stefan Racquet re-installed at Frew Park, circa 2014

Brisbane hairdresser Stefan Ackerie had rescued his 7-metre (23 ft) tennis racquet icon (based on the Aldila brand) that was originally over the Milton Tennis Centre when it was demolished (he had sponsored the Queensland Tennis Open competition at that site), and 15 years later in June 2014, he had it re-erected over Frew Park.

Preceded by Kooyong Stadium, Melbourne; Kooyong Stadium, Melbourne; Kooyong Stadium, Melbourne	Davis Cup; Final Venue; 1958; 1962; 1967	Succeeded by West Side Tennis Club, Forest Hills; Memorial Drive Park, Adelaide; Memorial Drive Park, Adelaide
