= Danone Australian Hardcourt Championships =

Defunct women's tennis tournament at Brisbane, Australia

Defunct tennis tournament
- Event name: Jason 2000 Classic (1987); Ariadne Classic (1988); Danone Hardcourt Championships (1989–94)
- Tour: WTA Tour
- Founded: 1987
- Abolished: 1994
- Editions: 8
- Location: Brisbane, Australia
- Category: WTA Tier V (1988–89); WTA Tier IV (1990–92); WTA Tier III (1993–94)
- Surface: Grass (1987–88); Hard (1989–94)

The Danone Hardcourt Championships is a defunct WTA Tour affiliated women's tennis tournament played from 1987 to 1994. It was held at the Milton Tennis Centre in Brisbane, Australia, and played on grass courts from 1987 to 1988 and on outdoor hard courts from 1989 to 1994.

== Results ==
=== Singles ===
Year	Champions	Runners-up	Score
1987	(Czechoslovakia) Hana Mandlíková	(United States) Pam Shriver	6–2, 2–6, 6–4
1988	(United States) Pam Shriver	(Czechoslovakia) Jana Novotná	7–6, 7–6
1989	(Czechoslovakia) Helena Suková	(Netherlands) Brenda Schultz	7–6, 7–6
1990	(Soviet Union) Natasha Zvereva	(Australia) Rachel McQuillan	6–4, 6–0
1991	(Czechoslovakia) Helena Suková	(Japan) Akiko Kijimuta	6–4, 6–3
1992	(Australia) Nicole Bradtke	(Australia) Rachel McQuillan	6–3, 6–2
1993	(Spain) Conchita Martínez	(Bulgaria) Magdalena Maleeva	6–3, 6–4
1994	(United States) Lindsay Davenport	(Argentina) Florencia Labat	6–1, 2–6, 6–3

=== Doubles ===
Year	Champions	Runners-up	Score
1987	(Czechoslovakia) Hana Mandlíková (Australia) Wendy Turnbull	(United States) Betsy Nagelsen (Australia) Elizabeth Smylie	6–4, 6–3
1988	(United States) Betsy Nagelsen (United States) Pam Shriver	(West Germany) Claudia Kohde-Kilsch (Czechoslovakia) Helena Suková	2–6, 7–5, 6–2
1989	(Czechoslovakia) Jana Novotná (Czechoslovakia) Helena Suková	(United States) Patty Fendick (Canada) Jill Hetherington	6–7, 6–1, 6–2
1990	(Czechoslovakia) Jana Novotná (Czechoslovakia) Helena Suková	(Australia) Hana Mandlíková (United States) Pam Shriver	6–3, 6–1
1991	(United States) Gigi Fernández (Czechoslovakia) Jana Novotná	(United States) Patty Fendick (Czechoslovakia) Helena Suková	6–3, 6–1
1992	(Czechoslovakia) Jana Novotná (Commonwealth of Independent States) Larisa Savchenko	(Netherlands) Manon Bollegraf (Australia) Nicole Bradtke	6–4, 6–3
1993	(Spain) Conchita Martínez (Latvia) Larisa Savchenko	(United States) Shannan McCarthy (United States) Kimberly Po	6–2, 6–2
1994	(Italy) Laura Golarsa (Ukraine) Natalia Medvedeva	(Australia) Jenny Byrne (Australia) Rachel McQuillan	6–3, 6–1

== See also ==
- Australian Hard Court Championships
