= 1999 Sparkassen Cup (tennis) =

- Date: 1–7 November
- Edition: 10th
- Category: Tier II
- Draw: 28S / 16D
- Prize money: $520,000
- Surface: Hard / indoor
- Location: Leipzig, Germany

Champions

Singles
- (France) Nathalie Tauziat

Doubles
- (France) Mary Pierce / (Latvia) Larisa Neiland
← 1998 ·	Sparkassen Cup	· 2000 →

The 1999 Sparkassen Cup (tennis) was a women's tennis tournament played on indoor hard courts in Leipzig, Germany. It was part of the Tier II category of the 1999 WTA Tour. The tournament was held from 1 November until 7 November 1999. Second-seeded Nathalie Tauziat won the singles title and earned $80,000 first-prize money.

== Finals ==
=== Singles ===
(France) Nathalie Tauziat defeated (Czech Republic) Květa Hrdličková, 6–1, 6–3

- This was Tauziat's sixth WTA title of her career, and her second of the year.

=== Doubles ===
(France) Mary Pierce / (Latvia) Larisa Neiland defeated (Russia) Elena Likhovtseva / (Japan) Ai Sugiyama, 6–4, 6–3

== Entrants ==
=== Seeds ===
Country	Player	Rank	Seed
FRA	Mary Pierce	5	1
FRA	Nathalie Tauziat	7	2
FRA	Julie Halard-Decugis	9	3
BEL	Dominique Van Roost	14	4
RUS	Anna Kournikova	12	5
ESP	Conchita Martínez	15	6
RUS	Elena Likhovtseva	18	7
GER	Anke Huber	16	8

=== Other entrants ===
The following players received wildcards into the singles main draw:

- (Belgium) Sabine Appelmans
- (Belgium) Kim Clijsters
- (Germany) Sandra Klösel

The following players received wildcards into the doubles main draw:

- (Germany) Julia Schruff / (Germany) Lydia Steinbach

The following players received entry from the singles qualifying draw:

- (Russia) Tatiana Panova
- (Czech Republic) Květa Hrdličková
- (Russia) Nadia Petrova
- (Czech Republic) Sandra Kleinová
