= 2003 Sparkassen Cup – Doubles =

Doubles
- 2003 Sparkassen Cup

Final
- Champions: (Russia) Svetlana Kuznetsova (United States) Martina Navratilova
- Runners-up: (Russia) Elena Likhovtseva (Russia) Nadia Petrova
- Score: 3–6, 6–1, 6–3

Details
- Draw: 16
- Seeds: 4

Events
Singles	Doubles
← 2002 ·	Sparkassen Cup

The 2003 Sparkassen Cup doubles was the tennis doubles event of the thirteenth and final edition of the Sparkassen Cup; a WTA Tier II tournament held in Leipzig, Germany.

Alexandra Stevenson and Serena Williams were the defending champions, but Williams elected not to compete this year. Stevenson instead partnered Anastasia Myskina, but lost in the quarterfinals to Elena Likhovtseva and Nadia Petrova.

Top seeds Svetlana Kuznetsova and Martina Navratilova won the title, defeating Likhovtseva and Petrova in the final, 3–6, 6–1, 6–3.

== Seeds ==
1. (Russia) Svetlana Kuznetsova / (United States) Martina Navratilova (champions)
2. (Russia) Elena Likhovtseva / (Russia) Nadia Petrova (final)
3. (Belgium) Els Callens / (Slovakia) Janette Husárová (quarterfinals)
4. (France) Marion Bartoli / (Federal Republic of Yugoslavia) Jelena Dokic (semifinals)

== Draw ==
=== Key ===
- Q = Qualifier
- WC = Wild card
- LL = Lucky loser
- Alt = Alternate
- ITF = ITF entry
- PR = Protected ranking
- SR = Special ranking
- SE = Special exempt
- JE = Junior exempt
- JR = Junior Accelerator Programme entrant
- CO = College Accelerator Programme entrant
- NG = Next Gen Accelerator Program entrant
- w/o = Walkover
- r = Retired
- d = Defaulted

=== Draw ===
First round
1	(Russia) S Kuznetsova (United States) M Navratilova	6	4	7
Q	(Hungary) A Kapros (Germany) L Steinbach	2	6	5
(Germany) B Rittner (Venezuela) M Vento-Kabchi	0	3
(Slovakia) D Hantuchová (Austria) B Schett	6	6
4	(France) M Bartoli (Federal Republic of Yugoslavia) J Dokic	7^{7}	6
(Spain) M Serna (United States) M Shaughnessy	6^{5}	2
(Croatia) J Kostanić (Hungary) K Marosi	3	4
(Bulgaria) M Maleeva (Switzerland) P Schnyder	6	6
(Greece) E Daniilidou (Italy) R Grande	6	6
(Italy) S Farina-Elia (Italy) F Schiavone	4	3
WC	(Germany) V Henke (Germany) C Schneider	2	5
3	(Belgium) E Callens (Slovakia) J Husárová	6	7
(Russia) A Myskina (United States) A Stevenson	7	1	6
(Canada) S Jeyaseelan (Slovenia) M Matevzic	5	6	2
(Slovenia) T Križan (Ukraine) T Perebiynis	3	0
2	(Russia) E Likhovtseva (Russia) N Petrova	6	6

Quarterfinals
1	(Russia) S Kuznetsova (United States) M Navratilova	6	6
(Slovakia) D Hantuchová (Austria) B Schett	4	3
4	(France) M Bartoli (Federal Republic of Yugoslavia) J Dokic	6	3	7
(Bulgaria) M Maleeva (Switzerland) P Schnyder	2	6	5
(Greece) E Daniilidou (Italy) R Grande	2
3	(Belgium) E Callens (Slovakia) J Husárová	2^{r}
(Russia) A Myskina (United States) A Stevenson	1	6	1
(Russia) E Likhovtseva (Russia) N Petrova	6	4	6

Semifinals
1	(Russia) S Kuznetsova (United States) M Navratilova	6	6
4	(France) M Bartoli (Federal Republic of Yugoslavia) J Dokic	3	1
(Greece) E Daniilidou (Italy) R Grande	3	1
2	(Russia) E Likhovtseva (Russia) N Petrova	6	6

Final
1	(Russia) S Kuznetsova (United States) M Navratilova	3	6	6
2	(Russia) E Likhovtseva (Russia) N Petrova	6	1	3

== Qualifying ==
=== Seeds ===
1. (Germany) Adriana Barna / (Italy) Mara Santangelo (first round)
2. (Germany) Stephanie Gehrlein / (Germany) Anna-Lena Grönefeld (first round)

=== Qualifiers ===
1. (Hungary) Anikó Kapros / (Germany) Lydia Steinbach

=== Draw ===
First round			Qualifying competition
1	(Germany) Adriana Barna (Italy) Mara Santangelo	8^{5}
	(Slovenia) Tina Pisnik (Federal Republic of Yugoslavia) Višnja Vuletić	9^{7}		(Slovenia) Tina Pisnik (Federal Republic of Yugoslavia) Višnja Vuletić	3	2
WC	(Hungary) Anikó Kapros (Germany) Lydia Steinbach	9^{8}	WC	(Hungary) Anikó Kapros (Germany) Lydia Steinbach	6	6
2	(Germany) Stephanie Gehrlein (Germany) Anna-Lena Grönefeld	8^{6}
