= 2000 Sparkassen Cup – Doubles =

Doubles
- 2000 Sparkassen Cup

Final
- Champions: (Spain) Arantxa Sánchez Vicario (France) Anne-Gaëlle Sidot
- Runners-up: (Belgium) Kim Clijsters (Belgium) Laurence Courtois
- Score: 6–7^{(6–8)}, 7–5, 6–3

Details
- Draw: 16 (1WC/1Q)
- Seeds: 4

Events
Singles	Doubles
← 1999 ·	Sparkassen Cup	· 2001 →

Mary Pierce and Larisa Neiland were the defending champions, but none competed this year. Neiland retired from professional tennis during this season.

Arantxa Sánchez Vicario and Anne-Gaëlle Sidot won the title by defeating Kim Clijsters and Laurence Courtois 6–7^{(6–8)}, 7–5, 6–3 in the final.

== Seeds ==
1. (France) Alexandra Fusai / (France) Nathalie Tauziat (first round)
2. (Spain) Arantxa Sánchez Vicario / (France) Anne-Gaëlle Sidot (champions)
3. (United States) Nicole Arendt / (Netherlands) Manon Bollegraf (semifinals)
4. (Romania) Cătălina Cristea / (Russia) Elena Likhovtseva (first round)

== Draw ==
Key

- Q = Qualifier
- WC = Wild card
- LL = Lucky loser
- Alt = Alternate
- ITF = ITF entry
- PR = Protected ranking
- SR = Special ranking
- SE = Special exempt
- JE = Junior exempt
- JR = Junior Accelerator Programme entrant
- CO = College Accelerator Programme entrant
- NG = Next Gen Accelerator Program entrant
- w/o = Walkover
- r = Retired
- d = Defaulted

=== Draw ===
First round
1	(France) A Fusai (France) N Tauziat	3	4
(Federal Republic of Yugoslavia) S Načuk (Slovenia) T Pisnik	6	6
(Czech Republic) K Hrdličková (Germany) B Rittner	2	6	6^{6}
(Germany) A Glass (Germany) B Lamade	6	2	7^{8}
4	(Romania) C Cristea (Russia) E Likhovtseva	5	2
(Belgium) K Clijsters (Belgium) L Courtois	7	6
(Netherlands) K Boogert (Netherlands) M Oremans	3	6	5
(Romania) R Dragomir (Argentina) L Montalvo	6	4	7
(Czech Republic) E Martincová (Czech Republic) E Melicharová	6	1	7^{7}
Q	(Slovenia) M Matevžič (Germany) C Schneider	4	6	6^{1}
(Belgium) S Appelmans (Slovakia) J Husárová	2	3
3	(United States) N Arendt (Netherlands) M Bollegraf	6	6
(Spain) M Serna (Netherlands) C Vis	7	5	6
WC	(Russia) E Dementieva (Germany) J Kandarr	5	7	3
(Australia) J Dokic (Bulgaria) M Maleeva	2	7^{7}	4
2	(Spain) A Sánchez Vicario (France) A-G Sidot	6	6^{3}	6

Quarterfinals
(Federal Republic of Yugoslavia) S Načuk (Slovenia) T Pisnik	6	3	6
(Germany) A Glass (Germany) B Lamade	4	6	3
(Belgium) K Clijsters (Belgium) L Courtois	6	6
(Romania) R Dragomir (Argentina) L Montalvo	0	2
(Czech Republic) E Martincová (Czech Republic) E Melicharová	3	1^{r}
3	(United States) N Arendt (Netherlands) M Bollegraf	6	4
(Spain) M Serna (Netherlands) C Vis	5	2
2	(Spain) A Sánchez Vicario (France) A-G Sidot	7	6

Semifinals
(Federal Republic of Yugoslavia) S Načuk (Slovenia) T Pisnik	3	4
(Belgium) K Clijsters (Belgium) L Courtois	6	6
3	(United States) N Arendt (Netherlands) M Bollegraf	5	6	5
2	(Spain) A Sánchez Vicario (France) A-G Sidot	7	4	7

Final
(Belgium) K Clijsters (Belgium) L Courtois	7^{8}	5	3
2	(Spain) A Sánchez Vicario (France) A-G Sidot	6^{6}	7	6

== Qualifying ==
=== Qualifying seeds ===
1. (Slovenia) Maja Matevžič / (Germany) Caroline Schneider (qualified)
2. (Germany) Magdalena Kučerová / (Germany) Angelika Rösch (first round)

=== Qualifiers ===
1. (Slovenia) Maja Matevžič / (Germany) Caroline Schneider

=== Qualifying draw ===
First round
1	(Slovenia) Maja Matevžič (Germany) Caroline Schneider	8
(Germany) Stephanie Gehrlein (Germany) Lydia Steinbach	2
(Bulgaria) Maria Geznenge (Bulgaria) Antoaneta Pandjerova	8
2	(Germany) Magdalena Kučerová (Germany) Angelika Rösch	5

Qualifying competition
1	(Slovenia) Maja Matevžič (Germany) Caroline Schneider	6	6
(Bulgaria) Maria Geznenge (Bulgaria) Antoaneta Pandjerova	3	1
