= 1996 Sparkassen Cup =

- Date: 30 September – 6 October
- Edition: 7th
- Category: Tier II
- Draw: 28S / 12D
- Prize money: $450,000
- Surface: Carpet / indoor
- Location: Leipzig, Germany

Champions

Singles
- (Germany) Anke Huber

Doubles
- (Netherlands) Kristie Boogert / (France) Nathalie Tauziat
← 1995 ·	WTA Leipzig	· 1997 →

The 1996 Sparkassen Cup was a women's tennis tournament played on indoor carpet courts in Leipzig in Germany that was part of the Tier II category of the 1996 WTA Tour. It was the seventh edition of the tournament and was held from 30 September through 6 October 1996. Fourth-seeded Anke Huber won the singles title.

== Finals ==
=== Singles ===
(Germany) Anke Huber defeated (Croatia) Iva Majoli 5–7, 6–3, 6–1

- It was Huber's 2nd title of the year and the 9th of her career.

=== Doubles ===
(Netherlands) Kristie Boogert / (France) Nathalie Tauziat defeated (Belgium) Sabine Appelmans / (Netherlands) Miriam Oremans 6–4, 6–4

- It was Boogert's 2nd title of the year and the 2nd of her career. It was Tauziat's 1st title of the year and the 14th of her career.
