= 1999 Sparkassen Cup – Singles =

Singles
- 1999 Sparkassen Cup

Final
- Champion: (France) Nathalie Tauziat
- Runner-up: (Czech Republic) Květa Hrdličková
- Score: 6–1, 6–3

Details
- Draw: 28
- Seeds: 8

Events
Singles	Doubles
← 1998 ·	Sparkassen Cup	· 2000 →

The 1999 Sparkassen Cup singles was the tennis singles event of the tenth edition of the Sparkassen Cup; a WTA Tier II tournament held in Leipzig, Germany. Steffi Graf was the defending champion but retired after Wimbledon earlier in the year.

After losing in last year's final, Nathalie Tauziat won the title this year, defeating qualifier Květa Hrdličková, 6–1, 6–3.

== Seeds ==
The top four seeds received a bye to the second round.

1. (France) Mary Pierce (semifinals)
2. (France) Nathalie Tauziat (champion)
3. (France) Julie Halard-Decugis (second round)
4. (Belgium) Dominique Van Roost (second round)
5. (Russia) Anna Kournikova (quarterfinals)
6. (Spain) Conchita Martínez (quarterfinals)
7. (Russia) Elena Likhovtseva (second round)
8. (Germany) Anke Huber (semifinals)

== Draw ==
=== Key ===
- Q = Qualifier
- WC = Wild card
- LL = Lucky loser
- Alt = Alternate
- SE = Special exempt
- PR = Protected ranking
- ITF = ITF entry
- JE = Junior exempt
- w/o = Walkover
- r = Retired
- d = Defaulted
- SR = Special ranking

=== Finals ===
Semifinals
1	(France) Mary Pierce	6	3	3
Q	(Czech Republic) Květa Hrdličková	1	6	6
8	(Germany) Anke Huber	7	4	3
2	(France) Nathalie Tauziat	5	6	6

Final
Q	(Czech Republic) Květa Hrdličková	1	3
2	(France) Nathalie Tauziat	6	6

=== Top half ===
First round
(Australia) J Dokic	4	5
Q	(Czech Republic) S Kleinová	6	7
(Slovakia) H Nagyová	3	3
Q	(Russia) T Panova	6	6
(Romania) I Spîrlea	1	6	4
6	(Spain) C Martínez	6	4	6
(South Africa) J Kruger	0	4
WC	(Belgium) S Appelmans	6	6
WC	(Belgium) K Clijsters	5	7	3
Q	(Czech Republic) K Hrdličková	7	5	6
WC	(Germany) S Klösel	4	2
7	(Russia) E Likhovtseva	6	6

Second round
1	(France) M Pierce	7	6
Q	(Czech Republic) S Kleinová	6	2
Q	(Russia) T Panova	7	3	1
6	(Spain) C Martínez	5	6	6
3	(France) J Halard-Decugis	2	3
WC	(Belgium) S Appelmans	6	6
Q	(Czech Republic) K Hrdličková	6	3	6
7	(Russia) E Likhovtseva	4	6	4

Quarterfinals
1	(France) M Pierce	6	6
6	(Spain) C Martínez	2	2
WC	(Belgium) S Appelmans	2	6	6
Q	(Czech Republic) K Hrdličková	6	2	7

Semifinals
1	(France) M Pierce	6	3	3
Q	(Czech Republic) K Hrdličková	1	6	6

=== Bottom half ===
First round
8	(Germany) A Huber	6	3	6
(Israel) A Smashnova	0	6	3
(Croatia) S Talaja	4	7	6
(Japan) A Sugiyama	6	5	3
SR	(Bulgaria) M Maleeva	3	6	3
(France) A-G Sidot	6	2	6
7	(Russia) A Kournikova	7	6
(Luxembourg) A Kremer	5	4
(France) S Testud	3	6	6
(Switzerland) P Schnyder	6	1	0
(Spain) M Serna	4	6
Q	(Russia) N Petrova	6	7

Second round
8	(Germany) A Huber	5	6	6
(Croatia) S Talaja	7	4	2
(France) A-G Sidot	3	6	6
4	(Belgium) D Van Roost	6	2	3
5	(Russia) A Kournikova	6	6
(France) S Testud	2	4
Q	(Russia) N Petrova	3	6	3
2	(France) N Tauziat	6	3	6

Quarterfinals
8	(Germany) A Huber	6	6
(France) A-G Sidot	4	4
5	(Russia) A Kournikova	6	5
2	(France) N Tauziat	7	7

Semifinals
8	(Germany) A Huber	7	4	3
2	(France) N Tauziat	5	6	6

== Qualifying ==
=== Seeds ===
1. (Russia) Tatiana Panova (Qualifier)
2. n.a.
3. (Russia) Elena Dementieva (qualifying competition)
4. (Czech Republic) Květa Hrdličková (Qualifier)
5. n.a.
6. (Bulgaria) Lubomira Bacheva (first round)
7. (Czech Republic) Adriana Gerši (qualifying competition)
8. (Belgium) Laurence Courtois (second round)
9. (Russia) Anastasia Myskina (qualifying competition)
10. (Czech Republic) Sandra Kleinová (Qualifier)

=== Qualifiers ===
1. (Russia) Tatiana Panova
2. (Czech Republic) Květa Hrdličková
3. (Russia) Nadia Petrova
4. (Czech Republic) Sandra Kleinová

== Qualifying draw ==
=== Key ===
- Q = Qualifier
- WC = Wild card
- LL = Lucky loser
- Alt = Alternate
- SE = Special exempt
- PR = Protected ranking
- ITF = ITF entry
- JE = Junior exempt
- w/o = Walkover
- r = Retired
- d = Defaulted
- SR = Special ranking

=== First qualifier ===
First round
1	(Russia) Tatiana Panova	6	6
(Croatia) Jelena Kostanić	4	1
(Austria) Evelyn Fauth	5	6	6
WC	(Germany) Lydia Steinbach	7	1	1
(Switzerland) Miroslava Vavrinec	7	6
(Romania) Raluca Sandu	5	4
(Germany) Katrin Meiss	2	1
7	(Czech Republic) Adriana Gerši	6	6

Second round
1	(Russia) Tatiana Panova	6	6
(Austria) Evelyn Fauth	0	4
(Switzerland) Miroslava Vavrinec	6	3
7	(Czech Republic) Adriana Gerši	7	6

Qualifying competition
1	(Russia) Tatiana Panova	6	6	6
7	(Czech Republic) Adriana Gerši	4	7	4

=== Second qualifier ===
First round
4	(Czech Republic) Květa Hrdličková	5	6	6
(Ukraine) Elena Tatarkova	7	4	4
(France) Alexandra Fusai	3	5
(Serbia and Montenegro) Sandra Načuk	6	7
(Czech Republic) Lenka Němečková	6	6
Alt	(Bulgaria) Svetlana Krivencheva	1	4
(Slovakia) Ľudmila Cervanová	2	6	3
9	(Russia) Anastasia Myskina	6	2	6

Second round
4	(Czech Republic) Květa Hrdličková	6	6
(Serbia and Montenegro) Sandra Načuk	2	4
(Czech Republic) Lenka Němečková	0	4
9	(Russia) Anastasia Myskina	6	6

Qualifying competition
4	(Czech Republic) Květa Hrdličková	6	6
9	(Russia) Anastasia Myskina	1	4

=== Third qualifier ===
First round
8	(Belgium) Laurence Courtois	6	6
(Germany) Jana Kandarr	4	3
(Russia) Nadia Petrova	2	6	6
(Slovakia) Martina Suchá	6	4	2
Alt	(Germany) Adriana Barna	2	4
(Hungary) Petra Mandula	6	6
(Slovakia) Janette Husárová	7	1	0
3	(Russia) Elena Dementieva	6	6	6

Second round
8	(Belgium) Laurence Courtois	6	2
(Russia) Nadia Petrova	7	6
(Hungary) Petra Mandula	1	2
3	(Russia) Elena Dementieva	6	6

Qualifying competition
(Russia) Nadia Petrova	6	6
3	(Russia) Elena Dementieva	4	3

=== Fourth qualifier ===
First round
6	(Bulgaria) Lubomira Bacheva	7	3	4
WC	(Germany) Mia Buric	6	6	6
WC	(Germany) Julia Schruff	4	6	2
(Germany) Angelika Bachmann	6	3	6
(Germany) Anca Barna	6	6
(Austria) Marion Maruska	4	0
(Austria) Patricia Wartusch	6	3
10	(Czech Republic) Sandra Kleinová	7	6

Second round
WC	(Germany) Mia Buric	6	5	2
(Germany) Angelika Bachmann	4	7	6
(Germany) Anca Barna	3	5
10	(Czech Republic) Sandra Kleinová	6	7

Qualifying competition
(Germany) Angelika Bachmann	0	0
10	(Czech Republic) Sandra Kleinová	6	6
