= 1995 Sparkassen Cup =

- Date: 25 September – 1 October
- Edition: 6th
- Category: Tier II
- Draw: 28S / 12D
- Prize money: $430,000
- Surface: Carpet / indoor
- Location: Leipzig, Germany

Champions

Singles
- (Germany) Anke Huber

Doubles
- (United States) Meredith McGrath (Latvia) Larisa Neiland
← 1994 ·	WTA Leipzig	· 1996 →

The 1995 Sparkassen Cup, also known by its full name Sparkassen Cup International Damen Grand Prix Leipzig, was a women's tennis tournament played on indoor carpet courts in Leipzig in Germany that was part of the Tier II category of the 1995 WTA Tour. It was the sixth edition of the tournament and was held from 25 September through 1 October 1995. Fourth-seeded Anke Huber won the singles title and earned $79,000 first-prize money.

== Finals ==
=== Singles ===
(Germany) Anke Huber defeated (Bulgaria) Magdalena Maleeva walkover

- It was Huber's 1st singles title of the year and the 7th of her career.

=== Doubles ===
(United States) Meredith McGrath / (Latvia) Larisa Neiland defeated (Netherlands) Brenda Schultz-McCarthy / (Netherlands) Caroline Vis 6–4, 6–4

- It was Neiland's 5th doubles title of the year and the 52nd of her career. It was McGrath's 5th doubles title of the year and the 21st of her career.
