= 2000 Sparkassen Cup – Singles =

Singles
- 2000 Sparkassen Cup

Final
- Champion: (Belgium) Kim Clijsters
- Runner-up: (Russia) Elena Likhovtseva
- Score: 7–6^{(8–6)}, 4–6, 6–4

Details
- Draw: 28 (3WC/4Q)
- Seeds: 8

Events
| Singles | Doubles |
| ← 1999 · | Sparkassen Cup | · 2001 → |

Nathalie Tauziat was the defending champion, but lost in semifinals to Elena Likhovtseva.

Kim Clijsters won the title by defeating Elena Likhovtseva 7–6^{(8–6)}, 4–6, 6–4 in the final.

== Seeds ==
The first four seeds received a bye into the second round.

1. (France) Nathalie Tauziat (semifinals)
2. (Spain) Arantxa Sánchez Vicario (second round)
3. (Russia) Anna Kournikova (semifinals)
4. (Russia) Elena Dementieva (quarterfinals)
5. (Bulgaria) Magdalena Maleeva (quarterfinals)
6. (Austria) Barbara Schett (quarterfinals)
7. (Russia) Elena Likhovtseva (final)
8. (Australia) Jelena Dokic (quarterfinals)

== Draw ==
Key

- Q = Qualifier
- WC = Wild card
- LL = Lucky loser
- Alt = Alternate
- ITF = ITF entry
- PR = Protected ranking
- SR = Special ranking
- SE = Special exempt
- JE = Junior exempt
- JR = Junior Accelerator Programme entrant
- CO = College Accelerator Programme entrant
- NG = Next Gen Accelerator Program entrant
- w/o = Walkover
- r = Retired
- d = Defaulted

=== Finals ===
Semifinals
1 | (France) Nathalie Tauziat | 1 | 4
7 | (Russia) Elena Likhovtseva | 6 | 6
3 | (Russia) Anna Kournikova | 2 | 3
(Belgium) Kim Clijsters | 6 | 6

Final
7 | (Russia) Elena Likhovtseva | 6^{6} | 6 | 4
(Belgium) Kim Clijsters | 7^{8} | 4 | 6

=== Top half ===
First round
(Russia) T Panova | 6 | 6
(Romania) R Dragomir | 4 | 2
(Czech Republic) D Chládková | 6 | 6
(Israel) A Smashnova | 1 | 2
Q | (Federal Republic of Yugoslavia) S Načuk | 4 | 7 | 4
6 | (Austria) B Schett | 6 | 5 | 6
WC | (Croatia) I Majoli | 7 | 1 | 6
(Belgium) S Appelmans | 5 | 6 | 3
(United States) L Raymond | 6 | 6
(Spain) G León García | 1 | 4
Q | (Slovakia) J Husárová | 6 | 3 | 0
7 | (Russia) E Likhovtseva | 4 | 6 | 6

Second round
1 | (France) N Tauziat | 4 | 6 | 7
(Russia) T Panova | 6 | 4 | 5
(Czech Republic) D Chládková | 3 | 2
6 | (Austria) B Schett | 6 | 6
4 | (Russia) E Dementieva | 6 | 6
WC | (Croatia) I Majoli | 2 | 3
(United States) L Raymond | 3 | 3
7 | (Russia) E Likhovtseva | 6 | 6

Quarterfinals
1 | (France) N Tauziat | 4 | 6 | 7^{7}
6 | (Austria) B Schett | 6 | 0 | 6^{2}
4 | (Russia) E Dementieva | 3 | 0
7 | (Russia) E Likhovtseva | 6 | 6

Semifinals
1 | (France) N Tauziat | 1 | 4
7 | (Russia) E Likhovtseva | 6 | 6

=== Bottom half ===
First round
5 | (Bulgaria) M Maleeva | 6 | 6
WC | (Germany) J Kandarr | 2 | 2
(France) A-G Sidot | 7^{7} | 2 | 5
(Czech Republic) K Hrdličková | 6^{4} | 6 | 7
(Spain) M Serna | 3 | 2
(Italy) S Farina Elia | 6 | 6
8 | (Australia) J Dokic | 6 | 6
Q | (Germany) A Glass | 2 | 2
WC | (Germany) B Rittner | 6 | 7
Q | (Austria) E Fauth | 3 | 5
(Japan) A Sugiyama | 0 | 2
(Belgium) K Clijsters | 6 | 6

Second round
5 | (Bulgaria) M Maleeva | 6 | 6
(Czech Republic) K Hrdličková | 4 | 0
(Italy) S Farina Elia | 3 | 1
3 | (Russia) A Kournikova | 6 | 6
8 | (Australia) J Dokic | 7^{8} | 6
WC | (Germany) B Rittner | 6^{6} | 2
(Belgium) K Clijsters | 7 | 6
2 | (Spain) A Sánchez Vicario | 5 | 1

Quarterfinals
5 | (Bulgaria) M Maleeva | 4 | 5
3 | (Russia) A Kournikova | 6 | 7
8 | (Australia) J Dokic | 6 | 2 | 6^{4}
(Belgium) K Clijsters | 4 | 6 | 7^{7}

Semifinals
3 | (Russia) A Kournikova | 2 | 3
(Belgium) K Clijsters | 6 | 6

== Qualifying ==
=== Qualifying seeds ===
1. (Netherlands) Kristie Boogert (qualifying competition)
2. (Slovenia) Tina Pisnik (second round)
3. (Netherlands) ~~Miriam Oremans~~ (withdrew)
4. (Czech Republic) Sandra Kleinová (second round)
5. (Federal Republic of Yugoslavia) Sandra Načuk (qualified)
6. (France) Émilie Loit (first round)
7. (Spain) Cristina Torrens Valero (first round)
8. (Bulgaria) Maria Geznenge (first round)

=== Qualifiers ===
1. (Slovakia) Janette Husárová
2. (Germany) Andrea Glass
3. (Austria) Evelyn Fauth
4. (Federal Republic of Yugoslavia) Sandra Načuk

=== Qualifying draw ===
==== First qualifier ====
First round
1 | (Netherlands) Kristie Boogert | 6 | 6
WC | (Germany) Jenny Kuehn | 0 | 1
(France) Alexandra Fusai | 6 | 3 | 3
(Slovenia) Maja Matevžič | 3 | 6 | 6
(Germany) Angelika Rösch | 6 | 6
(Czech Republic) Radka Pelikánová | 2 | 0
(Slovakia) Janette Husárová | 6 | 6
6 | (France) Émilie Loit | 4 | 4

Second round
1 | (Netherlands) Kristie Boogert | 6 | 2 | 7^{7}
(Slovenia) Maja Matevžič | 4 | 6 | 6^{2}
(Germany) Angelika Rösch | 3 | 3
(Slovakia) Janette Husárová | 6 | 6

Qualifying competition
1 | (Netherlands) Kristie Boogert | 2 | 2
(Slovakia) Janette Husárová | 6 | 6

==== Second qualifier ====
First round
4 | (Czech Republic) Sandra Kleinová | 6 | 7
(Belgium) Laurence Courtois | 1 | 5
(Germany) Andrea Glass | 6 | 6
(Germany) Meike Babel | 2 | 1
(Czech Republic) Eva Martincová | 3 | 7 | 6
(Poland) Anna Żarska | 6 | 5 | 4
(Bulgaria) Desislava Topalova | 4 | 7^{8} | 6
8 | (Bulgaria) Maria Geznenge | 6 | 6^{6} | 3

Second round
4 | (Czech Republic) Sandra Kleinová | 2 | 2
(Germany) Andrea Glass | 6 | 6
(Czech Republic) Eva Martincová | 1 | 3
(Bulgaria) Desislava Topalova | 6 | 6

Qualifying competition
(Germany) Andrea Glass | 7 | 6
(Bulgaria) Desislava Topalova | 5 | 4

==== Third qualifier ====
First round
7 | (Spain) Cristina Torrens Valero | 6^{8} | 6 | 3
(Austria) Evelyn Fauth | 7^{10} | 3 | 6
(Bulgaria) Antoaneta Pandjerova | 4 | 2
(Germany) Bianka Lamade | 6 | 6
(Germany) Gréta Arn | 6 | 2 | 3
WC | (Germany) Stephanie Gehrlein | 4 | 6 | 6
(Italy) Adriana Serra Zanetti | 6 | 6
Alt | (Czech Republic) Kateřina Sisková | 0 | 2

Second round
(Austria) Evelyn Fauth | 4 | 6 | 6
(Germany) Bianka Lamade | 6 | 4 | 4
WC | (Germany) Stephanie Gehrlein | 6 | 6
(Italy) Adriana Serra Zanetti | 2 | 4

Qualifying competition
(Austria) Evelyn Fauth | 6 | 6
WC | (Germany) Stephanie Gehrlein | 3 | 3

==== Fourth qualifier ====
First round
5 | (Federal Republic of Yugoslavia) Sandra Načuk | 6 | 6
WC | (Federal Republic of Yugoslavia) Višnja Vuletić | 2 | 2
(Germany) Magdalena Kučerová | 3 | 2
(Romania) Cătălina Cristea | 6 | 6
(Germany) Miriam Schnitzer | 6 | 6
WC | (Germany) Lydia Steinbach | 2 | 3
(Germany) Vanessa Henke | 4 | 3
2 | (Slovenia) Tina Pisnik | 6 | 6

Second round
5 | (Federal Republic of Yugoslavia) Sandra Načuk | 6 | 6
(Romania) Cătălina Cristea | 3 | 0
(Germany) Miriam Schnitzer | 6 | 6
2 | (Slovenia) Tina Pisnik | 1 | 2

Qualifying competition
5 | (Federal Republic of Yugoslavia) Sandra Načuk | 6 | 7^{7}
(Germany) Miriam Schnitzer | 3 | 6^{5}
