= 2003 Sparkassen Cup – Singles =

Singles
- 2003 Sparkassen Cup

Final
- Champion: (Russia) Anastasia Myskina
- Runner-up: (Belgium) Justine Henin-Hardenne
- Score: 3–6, 6–3, 6–3

Details
- Draw: 28
- Seeds: 8

Events
Singles	Doubles
← 2002 ·	Sparkassen Cup

Serena Williams was the defending champion and chose not to compete this year.

Anastasia Myskina won the title, defeating Justine Henin-Hardenne in the final 3–6, 6–3, 6–3.

== Seeds ==
The top four seeds received a bye to the second round.

1. (Belgium) Kim Clijsters (semifinals)
2. (Belgium) Justine Henin-Hardenne (final)
3. (Russia) Anastasia Myskina (champion)
4. (Bulgaria) Magdalena Maleeva (second round)
5. (Slovakia) Daniela Hantuchová (second round)
6. (Russia) Nadia Petrova (quarterfinals)
7. (United States) Meghann Shaughnessy (first round)
8. (Italy) Silvia Farina Elia (second round)

== Draw ==
=== Key ===
- Q = Qualifier
- WC = Wild card
- LL = Lucky loser
- Alt = Alternate
- ITF = ITF entry
- PR = Protected ranking
- SR = Special ranking
- SE = Special exempt
- JE = Junior exempt
- JR = Junior Accelerator Programme entrant
- CO = College Accelerator Programme entrant
- NG = Next Gen Accelerator Program entrant
- w/o = Walkover
- r = Retired
- d = Defaulted

=== Finals ===
Semifinals
1	(Belgium) Kim Clijsters	7	4^{r}
3	(Russia) Anastasia Myskina	5	4
Q	(Venezuela) María Vento-Kabchi	0	3
2	(Belgium) Justine Henin-Hardenne	6	6

Final
3	(Russia) Anastasia Myskina	3	6	6
2	(Belgium) Justine Henin-Hardenne	6	3	3

=== Top half ===
First round
(Federal Republic of Yugoslavia) J Dokic	7^{9}	6
Q	(Croatia) J Kostanić	6^{7}	4
(Russia) E Likhovtseva	7^{7}	5	3
(Switzerland) P Schnyder	6^{3}	7	6
(Russia) S Kuznetsova	5	2
5	(Slovakia) D Hantuchová	7	6
(Colombia) F Zuluaga	6^{5}	6^{3}
(Russia) L Krasnoroutskaya	7^{7}	7^{7}
WC	(Austria) B Schett	3	4
WC	(Germany) A-L Grönefeld	6	6
(Slovenia) K Srebotnik	2	4
6	(Russia) N Petrova	6	6

Second round
1	(Belgium) K Clijsters	6	6
(Federal Republic of Yugoslavia) J Dokic	3	4
(Switzerland) P Schnyder	6	4	7^{7}
5	(Slovakia) D Hantuchová	4	6	6^{3}
3	(Russia) A Myskina	6	6
(Russia) L Krasnoroutskaya	2	3
WC	(Germany) A-L Grönefeld	6	1	4
6	(Russia) N Petrova	3	6	6

Quarterfinals
1	(Belgium) K Clijsters	6	6
(Switzerland) P Schnyder	1	3
3	(Russia) A Myskina	6^{5}	6	6
6	(Russia) N Petrova	7^{7}	1	1

Semifinals
1	(Belgium) K Clijsters	7	4^{r}
3	(Russia) A Myskina	5	4

=== Bottom half ===
First round
8	(Italy) S Farina Elia	6	6^{4}	6
(Greece) E Daniilidou	1	7^{7}	2
WC	(Belgium) E Clijsters	3	1
Q	(Venezuela) M Vento-Kabchi	6	6
(Italy) F Schiavone	6^{2}	4
Q	(Czech Republic) S Kleinová	7^{7}	6
7	(United States) M Shaughnessy	6^{4}	6^{4}
Q	(Belgium) E Callens	7^{7}	7^{7}
(Switzerland) M-G Mikaelian	2	0^{r}
(United States) A Stevenson	6	2
(Spain) M Serna	1	5
(Czech Republic) D Chládková	6	7

Second round
8	(Italy) S Farina Elia	5	3
Q	(Venezuela) M Vento-Kabchi	7	6
Q	(Czech Republic) S Kleinová	6	6
4	(Bulgaria) M Maleeva	4	4
Q	(Belgium) E Callens	6	4	6
(United States) A Stevenson	4	6	2
(Czech Republic) D Chládková	1	2
2	(Belgium) J Henin-Hardenne	6	6

Quarterfinals
Q	(Venezuela) M Vento-Kabchi	6	3
Q	(Czech Republic) S Kleinová	0	1^{r}
Q	(Belgium) E Callens	2	4
2	(Belgium) J Henin-Hardenne	6	6

Semifinals
Q	(Venezuela) M Vento-Kabchi	0	3
2	(Belgium) J Henin-Hardenne	6	6

== Qualifying ==
=== Seeds ===
1. (Slovenia) Maja Matevžič (first round)
2. (Slovenia) Tina Pisnik (qualifying competition)
3. (Venezuela) María Vento-Kabchi (qualified)
4. (France) Marion Bartoli (qualifying competition)
5. (Italy) Rita Grande (second round)
6. (Germany) Marlene Weingärtner (first round)
7. (Ukraine) Tatiana Perebiynis (first round)
8. (Croatia) Jelena Kostanić (qualified)

=== Qualifiers ===
1. (Belgium) Els Callens
2. (Czech Republic) Sandra Kleinová
3. (Croatia) Jelena Kostanić
4. (Venezuela) María Vento-Kabchi

=== Qualifying draw ===
==== First qualifier ====
First round
1	(Slovenia) Maja Matevžič	4	6	3
(Czech Republic) Sandra Kleinová	6	2	6
(Czech Republic) Michaela Paštiková	2	7^{7}	3
(Ukraine) Julia Vakulenko	6	6	6
WC	(Germany) Lydia Steinbach	6	4	5
(Hungary) Anikó Kapros	2	6	7
(Germany) Barbara Rittner	6	6
6	(Germany) Marlene Weingärtner	4	4

Second round
(Czech Republic) Sandra Kleinová	6	6
(Ukraine) Julia Vakulenko	4	2
(Hungary) Anikó Kapros	5	6	1
(Germany) Barbara Rittner	7	0	6

Qualifying competition
(Czech Republic) Sandra Kleinová	6	7
(Germany) Barbara Rittner	0	5

==== Second qualifier ====
First round
2	(Slovenia) Tina Pisnik	6	6
WC	(Federal Republic of Yugoslavia) Višnja Vuletić	1	3
WC	(Germany) Laura Siegemund	2	3
(Italy) Mara Santangelo	6	6
(Belgium) Els Callens	6	6
(Hungary) Katalin Marosi	0	2
(Slovakia) Martina Suchá	6^{6}	6	7^{7}
7	(Ukraine) Tatiana Perebiynis	7^{8}	4	6^{4}

Second round
2	(Slovenia) Tina Pisnik	6	6
(Italy) Mara Santangelo	1	2
(Belgium) Els Callens	6	2	7
(Slovakia) Martina Suchá	4	6	5

Qualifying competition
2	(Slovenia) Tina Pisnik	3	1
(Belgium) Els Callens	6	6

==== Third qualifier ====
First round
3	(Venezuela) María Vento-Kabchi	6	6
(France) Camille Pin	2	1
(Bulgaria) Maria Geznenge	6	6
(Belgium) Debbrich Feys	3	3
(Germany) Stephanie Gehrlein	3	2
(Slovakia) Janette Husárová	6	6
(Austria) Sybille Bammer	6^{2}	4
5	(Italy) Rita Grande	7^{7}	6

Second round
3	(Venezuela) María Vento-Kabchi	6	6
(Bulgaria) Maria Geznenge	1	4
(Slovakia) Janette Husárová	6	6
5	(Italy) Rita Grande	4	2

Qualifying competition
3	(Venezuela) María Vento-Kabchi	2	6	6
(Slovakia) Janette Husárová	6	2	4

==== Fourth qualifier ====
First round
4	(France) Marion Bartoli	6	6
(Germany) Adriana Barna	2	1
(Czech Republic) Hana Šromová	6	3	2
WC	(Germany) Jasmin Wöhr	3	6	6
(Canada) Sonya Jeyaseelan	6	7
(Netherlands) Seda Noorlander	1	6^{3}
(Germany) Vanessa Henke	4	2
8	(Croatia) Jelena Kostanić	6	6

Second round
4	(France) Marion Bartoli	6	4	6
(Germany) Jasmin Wöhr	4	6	3
(Canada) Sonya Jeyaseelan	4	1
(Croatia) Jelena Kostanić	6	6

Qualifying competition
4	(France) Marion Bartoli	5	1
8	(Croatia) Jelena Kostanić	7	6
