= 1997 Sparkassen Cup – Doubles =

Doubles
- 1997 Sparkassen Cup

Final
- Champions: (Switzerland) Martina Hingis (Czech Republic) Jana Novotná
- Runners-up: (Indonesia) Yayuk Basuki (Czech Republic) Helena Suková
- Score: 6–2, 6–2

Details
- Draw: 16
- Seeds: 4

Events
Singles	Doubles
← 1996 ·	Sparkassen Cup	· 1998 →

Kristie Boogert and Nathalie Tauziat were the defending champions but only Boogert competed that year with Amanda Coetzer.

Boogert and Coetzer lost in the semifinals to Yayuk Basuki and Helena Suková.

Martina Hingis and Jana Novotná won in the final 6–2, 6–2 against Basuki and Suková.

== Seeds ==
Champion seeds are indicated in bold text while text in italics indicates the round in which those seeds were eliminated.

1. (Switzerland) **Martina Hingis** / (Czech Republic) **Jana Novotná (champions)**
2. (Indonesia) Yayuk Basuki / (Czech Republic) Helena Suková (final)
3. (Belgium) Sabine Appelmans / (Netherlands) Miriam Oremans (quarterfinals)
4. (Netherlands) Kristie Boogert / (South Africa) Amanda Coetzer (semifinals)

== Draw ==
=== Key ===
- Q = Qualifier
- WC = Wild card
- LL = Lucky loser
- Alt = Alternate
- ITF = ITF entry
- PR = Protected ranking
- SR = Special ranking
- SE = Special exempt
- JE = Junior exempt
- JR = Junior Accelerator Programme entrant
- CO = College Accelerator Programme entrant
- NG = Next Gen Accelerator Program entrant
- w/o = Walkover
- r = Retired
- d = Defaulted

First round
1	(Switzerland) **M Hingis** (Czech Republic) **J Novotná**	**6**	**6**
(Italy) S Farina (Austria) B Schett	0	0
(Ukraine) **O Lugina** (Czech Republic) **E Melicharová**	**6**	**6**
(Poland) M Grzybowska (Czech Republic) P Langrová	3	3
3	(Belgium) **S Appelmans** (Netherlands) **M Oremans**	**6**	**6**
(Austria) M Maruska (Germany) C Schneider	2	4
(Belgium) **E Callens** (Belgium) **L Courtois**	**7**	**7**
WC	(Croatia) I Majoli (Bulgaria) M Maleeva	5	5
(Italy) F Perfetti (Italy) G Pizzichini	6	5
(Canada) **R Simpson** (United Kingdom) **L Woodroffe**	**7**	**7**
(Germany) A Huber (Germany) B Rittner	3	1
4	(Netherlands) **K Boogert** (South Africa) **A Coetzer**	**6**	**6**
(France) A-G Sidot (Czech Republic) H Vildová	2	**6**	6
(Sweden) **Å Carlsson** (Italy) **R Grande**	**6**	3	**7**
Q	(South Africa) J Kruger (Italy) F Lubiani	4	4
2	(Indonesia) **Y Basuki** (Czech Republic) **H Suková**	**6**	**6**

Quarterfinals
1	(Switzerland) **M Hingis** (Czech Republic) **J Novotná**	**6**	**6**
(Ukraine) O Lugina (Czech Republic) E Melicharová	4	3
3	(Belgium) S Appelmans (Netherlands) M Oremans	**6**	4	3
(Belgium) **E Callens** (Belgium) **L Courtois**	3	**6**	**6**
(Canada) R Simpson (United Kingdom) L Woodroffe	1	0
4	(Netherlands) **K Boogert** (South Africa) **A Coetzer**	**6**	**6**
(Sweden) Å Carlsson (Italy) R Grande	2	6
2	(Indonesia) **Y Basuki** (Czech Republic) **H Suková**	**6**	**7**

Semifinals
1	(Switzerland) **M Hingis** (Czech Republic) **J Novotná**	**6**	**6**
(Belgium) E Callens (Belgium) L Courtois	2	0
4	(Netherlands) K Boogert (South Africa) A Coetzer	6	2
2	(Indonesia) **Y Basuki** (Czech Republic) **H Suková**	**7**	**6**

Final
1	(Switzerland) **Martina Hingis** (Czech Republic) **Jana Novotná**	**6**	**6**
2	(Indonesia) Yayuk Basuki (Czech Republic) Helena Suková	2	2
