= 1997 Sparkassen Cup – Singles =

Singles
- 1997 Sparkassen Cup

Final
- Champion: (Czech Republic) Jana Novotná
- Runner-up: (South Africa) Amanda Coetzer
- Score: 6–2, 4–6, 6–3

Details
- Draw: 28
- Seeds: 8

Events
Singles	Doubles
← 1996 ·	Sparkassen Cup	· 1998 →

Anke Huber was the defending champion but lost in the semifinals to Jana Novotná.

Novotná won in the final 6–2, 4–6, 6–3 against Amanda Coetzer.

== Seeds ==
A champion seed is indicated in bold text while text in italics indicates the round in which that seed was eliminated. The top four seeds received a bye to the second round.

1. (Switzerland) Martina Hingis (semifinals)
2. (Czech Republic) **Jana Novotná (champion)**
3. (Croatia) Iva Majoli (quarterfinals)
4. (South Africa) Amanda Coetzer (final)
5. (Germany) Anke Huber (semifinals)
6. (Austria) Barbara Paulus (second round)
7. (Belgium) Sabine Appelmans (quarterfinals)
8. (Indonesia) Yayuk Basuki (second round)

== Draw ==
=== Key ===
- Q = Qualifier
- WC = Wild card
- LL = Lucky loser
- Alt = Alternate
- ITF = ITF entry
- PR = Protected ranking
- SR = Special ranking
- SE = Special exempt
- JE = Junior exempt
- JR = Junior Accelerator Programme entrant
- CO = College Accelerator Programme entrant
- NG = Next Gen Accelerator Program entrant
- w/o = Walkover
- r = Retired
- d = Defaulted

=== Final ===
Final
4	(South Africa) Amanda Coetzer	2	**6**	3
2	(Czech Republic) **Jana Novotná**	**6**	4	**6**

=== Section 1 ===
First round
(Sweden) Å Carlsson	**6**	4	6
(Austria) **M Maruska**	4	**6**	**7**
(Czech Republic) D Chládková	6	**7**	0
(Netherlands) **M Oremans**	**7**	6	**6**
Q	(Canada) R Simpson	3	3
7	(Belgium) **S Appelmans**	**6**	**6**
(Bulgaria) **M Maleeva**	**6**	**6**
(Germany) B Rittner	2	2
Q	(Poland) **M Grzybowska**	**7**	**6**
(France) A-G Sidot	5	0
(Czech Republic) H Suková	**6**	4	2
6	(Austria) **B Paulus**	4	**6**	**6**

Second round
1	(Switzerland) **M Hingis**	**6**	**7**
(Austria) M Maruska	3	5
(Netherlands) M Oremans	**6**	3	5
7	(Belgium) **S Appelmans**	2	**6**	**7**
4	(South Africa) **A Coetzer**	**6**	**7**
(Bulgaria) M Maleeva	3	5
Q	(Poland) **M Grzybowska**	**6**	**7**
6	(Austria) B Paulus	2	5

Quarterfinals
1	(Switzerland) **M Hingis**	**6**	**6**
7	(Belgium) S Appelmans	3	2
4	(South Africa) **A Coetzer**	**6**	**7**
Q	(Poland) M Grzybowska	1	6

Semifinals
1	(Switzerland) M Hingis	4	**6**	6
4	(South Africa) **A Coetzer**	**6**	4	**7**

=== Section 2 ===
First round
5	(Germany) **A Huber**	**6**	**6**
(Italy) S Farina	4	2
(Belgium) L Courtois	3	4
(Spain) **M Serna**	**6**	**6**
(Austria) **B Schett**	**7**	**6**
WC	(Germany) A Glass	6	4
8	(Indonesia) **Y Basuki**	**7**	**6**
Q	(France) A Cocheteux	6	3
WC	(Germany) J Kandarr	4	0
Q	(Czech Republic) **S Kleinová**	**6**	**6**
(Belgium) E Callens	6	3
(South Africa) **J Kruger**	**7**	**6**

Second round
5	(Germany) **A Huber**	**6**	**6**
(Spain) M Serna	2	3
(Austria) B Schett	4	2
3	(Croatia) **I Majoli**	**6**	**6**
8	(Indonesia) Y Basuki	**6**	3	5
Q	(Czech Republic) **S Kleinová**	4	**6**	**7**
(South Africa) J Kruger	0	4
2	(Czech Republic) **J Novotná**	**6**	**6**

Quarterfinals
5	(Germany) **A Huber**	4	**7**	**6**
3	(Croatia) I Majoli	**6**	6	4
Q	(Czech Republic) S Kleinová	4	2
2	(Czech Republic) **J Novotná**	**6**	**6**

Semifinals
5	(Germany) A Huber	**7**	5	4
2	(Czech Republic) **J Novotná**	6	**7**	**6**
