= 2001 Sparkassen Cup – Singles =

Singles
- 2001 Sparkassen Cup

Final
- Champion: (Belgium) Kim Clijsters
- Runner-up: (Bulgaria) Magdalena Maleeva
- Score: 6–1, 6–1

Details
- Draw: 28
- Seeds: 8

Events
Singles	Doubles
← 2000 ·	Sparkassen Cup	· 2002 →

The 2001 Sparkassen Cup singles was the tennis singles event of the twelfth edition of the Sparkassen Cup; a WTA Tier II tournament held in Leipzig, Germany.

Kim Clijsters successfully defended her title, defeating Magdalena Maleeva in the final, 6–1, 6–1.

== Seeds ==
The top four seeds received a bye to the second round.

1. (Belgium) Kim Clijsters (champion)
2. (France) Nathalie Tauziat (semifinals)
3. (Federal Republic of Yugoslavia) Jelena Dokic (second round)
4. (United States) Meghann Shaughnessy (withdrew)
5. (Italy) Silvia Farina Elia (quarterfinals)
6. (Bulgaria) Magdalena Maleeva (final)
7. (Russia) Elena Dementieva (semifinals)
8. (Austria) Barbara Schett (first round)
9. (Russia) Anna Kournikova (second round)

== Draw ==
=== Key ===
- Q = Qualifier
- WC = Wild card
- LL = Lucky loser
- Alt = Alternate
- SE = Special exempt
- PR = Protected ranking
- ITF = ITF entry
- JE = Junior exempt
- w/o = Walkover
- r = Retired
- d = Defaulted
- SR = Special ranking

=== Finals ===
Semifinals
1	(Belgium) Kim Clijsters	6	3	6
7	(Russia) Elena Dementieva	1	6	1
6	(Bulgaria) Magdalena Maleeva	4	6	6
2	(France) Nathalie Tauziat	6	4	3

Final
1	(Belgium) Kim Clijsters	6	6
6	(Bulgaria) Magdalena Maleeva	1	1

=== Top half ===
First round
(Italy) F Schiavone	7	6
(Uzbekistan) I Tulyaganova	5	1
WC	(Czech Republic) K Hrdličková	6	6
(Spain) M Serna	1	3
Q	(Germany) B Rittner	4	7^{7}	4
5	(Italy) S Farina Elia	6	6^{2}	6
Q	(Slovakia) D Hantuchová	5
(Slovakia) H Nagyová	1^{r}
(Russia) E Likhovtseva	6	6
WC	(Germany) J Kandarr	4	4
Q	(Austria) B Schwartz	3	4
7	(Russia) E Dementieva	6	6

Second round
1	(Belgium) K Clijsters	6	6
(Italy) F Schiavone	3	3
WC	(Czech Republic) K Hrdličková	3	6	6^{10}
5	(Italy) S Farina Elia	6	4	7^{12}
3	(Federal Republic of Yugoslavia) J Dokic	6	6^{6}	0
Q	(Slovakia) D Hantuchová	4	7^{8}	6
(Russia) E Likhovtseva	7	4	5
7	(Russia) E Dementieva	5	6	7

Quarterfinals
1	(Belgium) K Clijsters	6	2	6
5	(Italy) S Farina Elia	1	6	4
Q	(Slovakia) D Hantuchová	4	3
7	(Russia) E Dementieva	6	6

Semifinals
1	(Belgium) K Clijsters	6	3	6
7	(Russia) E Dementieva	1	6	1

=== Bottom half ===
First round
6	(Bulgaria) M Maleeva	6	6
(Czech Republic) D Chládková	3	3
Q	(Russia) T Panova	7^{7}	7^{7}
(Russia) N Petrova	6^{3}	6^{5}
LL	(Russia) A Myskina	6	6
WC	(Croatia) I Majoli	3	2
8	(Austria) B Schett	6^{5}	4
(Germany) A Huber	7^{7}	6
(Czech Republic) D Bedáňová	5	7	4
(Luxembourg) A Kremer	7	5	6
(Spain) Á Montolio	4	6	7
(Spain) C Torrens Valero	6	4	5

Second round
6	(Bulgaria) M Maleeva	6	2	6
Q	(Russia) T Panova	2	6	3
LL	(Russia) A Myskina	6	3	6
9	(Russia) A Kournikova	4	6	3
(Germany) A Huber	4	4
(Luxembourg) A Kremer	6	6
(Spain) Á Montolio	7^{7}	3	4
2	(France) N Tauziat	6^{2}	6	6

Quarterfinals
6	(Bulgaria) M Maleeva	6	6
LL	(Russia) A Myskina	4	3
(Luxembourg) A Kremer	2	7	2
2	(France) N Tauziat	6	5	6

Semifinals
6	(Bulgaria) M Maleeva	4	6	6
2	(France) N Tauziat	6	4	3
