= 1995 Sparkassen Cup – Singles =

Singles
- 1995 Sparkassen Cup
- 1994 Champion: (Czechoslovakia) Jana Novotná

Final
- Champion: (Germany) Anke Huber
- Runner-up: (Bulgaria) Magdalena Maleeva
- Score: Walkover

Details
- Draw: 28 (1WC/4Q/1LL)
- Seeds: 8

Events
Singles	Doubles
← 1994 ·	Sparkassen Cup	· 1996 →

Jana Novotná was the defending champion, but lost in the quarterfinals to Judith Wiesner.

Anke Huber won the title after Magdalena Maleeva withdrew due to a stomach illness suffered before the final.

== Seeds ==
The top four seeds received a bye to the second round.

1. (Czech Republic) Jana Novotná (quarterfinals)
2. (Bulgaria) Magdalena Maleeva (final, withdrew due to a stomach illness)
3. (United States) Lindsay Davenport (second round)
4. (Germany) Anke Huber (champion)
5. (Netherlands) Brenda Schultz-McCarthy (second round)
6. (Czech Republic) Helena Suková (second round)
7. (United States) Marianne Werdel-Witmeyer (semifinals)
8. (Belgium) Sabine Appelmans (first round)

== Draw ==
=== Key ===
- Q = Qualifier
- WC = Wild card
- LL = Lucky loser
- Alt = Alternate
- SE = Special exempt
- PR = Protected ranking
- ITF = ITF entry
- JE = Junior exempt
- w/o = Walkover
- r = Retired
- d = Defaulted
- SR = Special ranking

=== Finals ===
Semifinals
(Austria) Judith Wiesner	0	2
4	(Germany) Anke Huber	6	6
7	(United States) Marianne Werdel-Witmeyer	3	1
2	(Bulgaria) Magdalena Maleeva	6	6

Final
4	(Germany) Anke Huber	w/o
2	(Bulgaria) Magdalena Maleeva

=== Top half ===
First round
(Romania) R Dragomir	6	3	3
(Austria) B Reinstadler	2	6	6
(Austria) J Wiesner	1	7	6
(Sweden) Å Carlsson	6	5	2
(Netherlands) M Oremans	6	6^{4}	6
8	(Belgium) S Appelmans	4	7^{7}	3
(Germany) B Rittner	7	6
Q	(Australia) R Stubbs	5	1
LL	(Netherlands) M Bollegraf	3	1
(Russia) E Likhovtseva	6	6
(Czech Republic) L Richterová	2	6^{7}
6	(Czech Republic) H Suková	6	7^{9}

Second round
1	(Czech Republic) J Novotná	6	6
(Austria) B Reinstadler	4	2
(Austria) J Wiesner	6	6
(Netherlands) M Oremans	4	3
4	(Germany) A Huber	5	7^{8}	6
(Germany) B Rittner	7	6^{6}	4
(Russia) E Likhovtseva	6	6
6	(Czech Republic) H Suková	3	4

Quarterfinals
1	(Czech Republic) J Novotná	4	2
(Austria) J Wiesner	6	6
4	(Germany) A Huber	6	7^{7}
(Russia) E Likhovtseva	4	6^{4}

Semifinals
(Austria) J Wiesner	0	2
4	(Germany) A Huber	6	6

=== Bottom half ===
First round
7	(United States) M Werdel-Witmeyer	3	6	6
(Belgium) L Courtois	6	2	3
(Netherlands) K Boogert	6	6
(Germany) C Singer	1	4
(South Africa) J Kruger	7^{7}	6
Q	(Germany) M Weingärtner	6^{5}	1
5	(Netherlands) B Schultz-McCarthy	7^{14}	6^{2}	6
Q	(Germany) M Kochta	6^{12}	7^{7}	3
Q	(United States) L Lee	5	6	6
(Belgium) E Callens	7	4	4
(Germany) P Begerow	3	2
(Latvia) L Neiland	6	6

Second round
7	(United States) M Werdel-Witmeyer	6	6
(Netherlands) K Boogert	3	2
(South Africa) J Kruger	4	6	6
3/WC	(United States) L Davenport	6	4	2
5	(Netherlands) B Schultz-McCarthy	4	6	1
Q	(United States) L Lee	6	3	6
(Latvia) L Neiland	6	2	2
2	(Bulgaria) M Maleeva	3	6	6

Quarterfinals
7	(United States) M Werdel-Witmeyer	6	6
(South Africa) J Kruger	3	2
Q	(United States) L Lee	3	1
2	(Bulgaria) M Maleeva	6	6

Semifinals
7	(United States) M Werdel-Witmeyer	3	1
2	(Bulgaria) M Maleeva	6	6
