= 2001 Sparkassen Cup (tennis) =

- Date: 24–30 September
- Edition: 12th
- Category: Tier II
- Draw: 28S / 16D
- Prize money: $565,000
- Surface: Hard / indoor
- Location: Leipzig, Germany

Champions

Singles
- (Belgium) Kim Clijsters

Doubles
- (Russia) Elena Likhovtseva / (France) Nathalie Tauziat
- Sparkassen Cup

The 2001 Sparkassen Cup (tennis) was a women's tennis tournament played on indoor hard courts in Leipzig, Germany. It was part of the Tier II category of the 2001 WTA Tour. The tournament was held from 24 September until 30 September 2002. First-seeded Kim Clijsters won the singles title and earned $90,000 first-prize money.

== Finals ==
=== Singles ===
- (Belgium) Kim Clijsters defeated (Bulgaria) Magdalena Maleeva, 6–1, 6–1

=== Doubles ===
- (Russia) Elena Likhovtseva / (France) Nathalie Tauziat defeated (Czech Republic) Květa Hrdlickova / (Germany) Barbara Rittner, 6–4, 6–2

== Singles main draw entrants ==
=== Seeds ===
Country	Player	Rank	Seed
BEL	Kim Clijsters	5	1
FRA	Nathalie Tauziat	10	2
FR Yugoslavia	Jelena Dokic	11	3
~~USA~~	~~Meghann Shaughnessy~~	~~12~~	~~4~~
ITA	Silvia Farina Elia	15	5
BUL	Magdalena Maleeva	16	6
RUS	Elena Dementieva	17	7
AUT	Barbara Schett	18	8
RUS	Anna Kournikova	21	9

=== Other entrants ===
The following players received wildcards into the singles main draw:

- (Czech Republic) Květa Hrdlickova
- (Germany) Jana Kandarr
- (Croatia) Iva Majoli

The following players received entry from the singles qualifying draw:

- (Slovakia) Daniela Hantuchová
- (Russia) Tatiana Panova
- (Germany) Barbara Rittner
- (Austria) Barbara Schwartz

The following players received entry as lucky losers into the singles main draw:

- (Russia) Anastasia Myskina

== Doubles main draw entrants ==
=== Seeds ===
Country	Player	Country	Player	Rank	Seed
RUS	Elena Likhovtseva	FRA	Nathalie Tauziat	12	1
BEL	Kim Clijsters	FR Yugoslavia	Jelena Dokic	42	2
~~SVK~~	~~Henrieta Nagyová~~	~~AUT~~	~~Barbara Schett~~	~~55~~	~~3~~
SVK	Karina Habšudová	UKR	Elena Tatarkova	80	4

=== Other entrants ===
The following pairs received wildcards into the doubles main draw:

- (Germany) Martina Müller / (Croatia) Silvija Talaja

The following pairs received entry from the singles qualifying draw:

- (Spain) Marta Marrero / (Italy) Francesca Schiavone
