= 1999 Sparkassen Cup – Doubles =

Doubles
- 1999 Sparkassen Cup

Final
- Champions: (Latvia) Larisa Neiland (France) Mary Pierce
- Runners-up: (Russia) Elena Likhovtseva (Japan) Ai Sugiyama
- Score: 6–4, 6–3

Details
- Draw: 16
- Seeds: 4

Events
Singles	Doubles
← 1998 ·	Sparkassen Cup	· 2000 →

The 1999 Sparkassen Cup doubles was the tennis doubles event of the tenth edition of the Sparkassen Cup; a WTA Tier II tournament held in Leipzig, Germany. Elena Likhovtseva and Ai Sugiyama were the defending champions but were defeated in this year's final by Larisa Neiland and Mary Pierce, 6–1, 6–3.

== Seeds ==
1. (Russia) Elena Likhovtseva / (Japan) Ai Sugiyama (final)
2. (France) Alexandra Fusai / (France) Nathalie Tauziat (semifinals)
3. (Latvia) Larisa Neiland / (France) Mary Pierce (champions)
4. (Romania) Irina Spîrlea / (Netherlands) Caroline Vis (first round, retired)

== Draw ==
=== Key ===
- Q = Qualifier
- WC = Wild card
- LL = Lucky loser
- Alt = Alternate
- SE = Special exempt
- PR = Protected ranking
- ITF = ITF entry
- JE = Junior exempt
- w/o = Walkover
- r = Retired
- d = Defaulted
- SR = Special ranking

First round
1	(Russia) E Likhovtseva (Japan) A Sugiyama	6	6
(Germany) An Barna (Bulgaria) S Krivencheva	4	2
(Australia) J Dokic (Germany) J Kandarr	1	4
(France) A-G Sidot (Belgium) D Van Roost	6	6
4	(Romania) I Spîrlea (Netherlands) C Vis	1	r
(Slovakia) H Nagyová (Spain) M Serna	4
WC	(Germany) J Schruff (Germany) L Steinbach	6	5	2
(Luxembourg) A Kremer (South Africa) J Kruger	3	7	6
(Slovakia) J Husárová (Serbia and Montenegro) S Načuk	6	6
(Germany) Ad Barna (Bulgaria) M Maleeva	1	2
(Germany) M Babel (Germany) M Buric	3	6
3	(Latvia) L Neiland (France) M Pierce	6	7
(Belgium) S Appelmans (Belgium) K Clijsters	4	6	7
(Spain) C Martínez (Argentina) P Tarabini	6	3	5
(Netherlands) A Hopmans (Croatia) S Talaja	3	4
2	(France) A Fusai (France) N Tauziat	6	6

Quarterfinals
1	(Russia) E Likhovtseva (Japan) A Sugiyama	6	6
(France) A-G Sidot (Belgium) D Van Roost	1	3
(Slovakia) H Nagyová (Spain) M Serna	6	6
(Luxembourg) A Kremer (South Africa) J Kruger	4	0
(Slovakia) J Husárová (Serbia and Montenegro) S Načuk	1	3
3	(Latvia) L Neiland (France) M Pierce	6	6
(Belgium) S Appelmans (Belgium) K Clijsters	3	2
2	(France) A Fusai (France) N Tauziat	6	6

Semifinals
1	(Russia) E Likhovtseva (Japan) A Sugiyama	6	6	6
(Slovakia) H Nagyová (Spain) M Serna	1	7	1
3	(Latvia) L Neiland (France) M Pierce	7	4	6
2	(France) A Fusai (France) N Tauziat	6	6	4

Final
1	(Russia) E Likhovtseva (Japan) A Sugiyama	4	3
3	(Latvia) L Neiland (France) M Pierce	6	6
