= 1998 Sparkassen Cup =

- Date: 2–8 November
- Edition: 9th
- Category: Tier II
- Draw: 28S /16D
- Prize money: $450,000
- Surface: Carpet / indoor
- Location: Leipzig, Germany

Champions

Singles
- (Germany) Steffi Graf

Doubles
- (Russia) Elena Likhovtseva / (Japan) Ai Sugiyama
← 1997 ·	Sparkassen Cup	· 1999 →

The 1998 Sparkassen Cup was a women's tennis tournament played on indoor carpet courts in Leipzig in Germany that was part of the Tier II category of the 1998 WTA Tour. It was the ninth edition of the tournament and was held from 2 November until 8 November 1998. Unseeded Steffi Graf won the singles title, her fifth at the event, and earned $79,000 first-prize money.

== Finals ==
=== Singles ===
(Germany) Steffi Graf defeated (France) Nathalie Tauziat 6–3, 6–4

- It was Graf's 2nd title of the year and the 116th of her career.

=== Doubles ===
(Russia) Elena Likhovtseva / (Japan) Ai Sugiyama defeated (Netherlands) Manon Bollegraf / (Romania) Irina Spîrlea 6–3, 6–7, 6–2

- It was Likhovtseva's 3rd title of the year and the 5th of her career. It was Sugiyama's 5th title of the year and the 9th of her career.
