= 1996 Sparkassen Cup – Doubles =

Doubles
- 1996 Sparkassen Cup
- 1995 Champions: (Latvia) Larisa Neiland (United States) Meredith McGrath

Final
- Champions: (Netherlands) Kristie Boogert (France) Nathalie Tauziat
- Runners-up: (Belgium) Sabine Appelmans (Netherlands) Miriam Oremans
- Score: 6–4, 6–4

Events
Singles	Doubles
← 1995 ·	Sparkassen Cup	· 1997 →

Larisa Savchenko and Meredith McGrath were the defending champions but only Savchenko competed that year with Helena Suková.

Savchenko and Suková lost in the semifinals to Sabine Appelmans and Miriam Oremans.

Kristie Boogert and Nathalie Tauziat won in the final 6–4, 6–4 against Appelmans and Oremans.

== Seeds ==
Champion seeds are indicated in bold text while text in italics indicates the round in which those seeds were eliminated. All four seeded teams received byes into the quarterfinals.

1. (Latvia) Larisa Savchenko / (Czech Republic) Helena Suková (semifinals)
2. (Netherlands) **Kristie Boogert** / (France) **Nathalie Tauziat (champions)**
3. (Belgium) Els Callens / (Russia) Elena Likhovtseva (quarterfinals)
4. (Belgium) Sabine Appelmans / (Netherlands) Miriam Oremans (quarterfinals)

== Draw ==
=== Key ===
- Q = Qualifier
- WC = Wild card
- LL = Lucky loser
- Alt = Alternate
- SE = Special exempt
- PR = Protected ranking
- ITF = ITF entry
- JE = Junior exempt
- w/o = Walkover
- r = Retired
- d = Defaulted
- SR = Special ranking

First round
(Germany) **C Schneider** (Slovakia) **K Studeníková**	4	**6**	**6**
(Sweden) Å Carlsson (Slovakia) K Habšudová	**6**	3	4
WC	(Austria) K Büche (Germany) L Steinbach	2	0
(Germany) **P Begerow** (United Kingdom) **S Smith**	**6**	**6**
(Germany) K Kschwendt (Austria) B Schett	4	1
(Italy) **G Pizzichini** (France) **A-G Sidot**	**6**	**6**
(Ukraine) O Lugina (Ukraine) N Medvedeva	4	**7**	0
(Romania) **R Dragomir** (Italy) **S Farina**	**6**	6	**6**

Quarterfinals
1	(Latvia) **L Savchenko** (Czech Republic) **H Suková**	**6**	**6**
(Germany) C Schneider (Slovakia) K Studeníková	4	1
4	(Belgium) **S Appelmans** (Netherlands) **M Oremans**	**7**	**6**
(Germany) P Begerow (United Kingdom) S Smith	6	3
(Italy) **G Pizzichini** (France) **A-G Sidot**	**6**	1	**6**
3	(Belgium) E Callens (Russia) E Likhovtseva	3	**6**	0
(Romania) R Dragomir (Italy) S Farina	0	4
2	(Netherlands) **K Boogert** (France) **N Tauziat**	**6**	**6**

Semifinals
1	(Latvia) L Savchenko (Czech Republic) H Suková	0	2
4	(Belgium) **S Appelmans** (Netherlands) **M Oremans**	**6**	**6**
(Italy) G Pizzichini (France) A-G Sidot	0	2
2	(Netherlands) **K Boogert** (France) **N Tauziat**	**6**	**6**

Final
4	(Belgium) Sabine Appelmans (Netherlands) Miriam Oremans	4	4
2	(Netherlands) **Kristie Boogert** (France) **Nathalie Tauziat**	**6**	**6**
