= 1998 Sparkassen Cup – Singles =

Singles
- 1998 Sparkassen Cup

Final
- Champion: (Germany) Steffi Graf
- Runner-up: (France) Nathalie Tauziat
- Score: 6–3, 6–4

Details
- Draw: 28
- Seeds: 8

Events
Singles	Doubles
← 1997 ·	Sparkassen Cup	· 1999 →

The 1998 Sparkassen Cup singles was the tennis singles event of the ninth edition of the Sparkassen Cup; a WTA Tier II tournament held in Leipzig, Germany.

Jana Novotná was the defending champion but chose not to compete this year.

Steffi Graf won the title, defeating Nathalie Tauziat in the final, 6–3, 6–4. This title would be Graf's last in her native Germany before retiring in 1999.

== Seeds ==
The top four seeds received a bye to the second round.

1. (Spain) Arantxa Sánchez-Vicario (second round)
2. (France) Nathalie Tauziat (final)
3. (Belgium) Dominique Van Roost (semifinals)
4. (Romania) Irina Spîrlea (semifinals)
5. (South Africa) Amanda Coetzer (second round)
6. (Japan) Ai Sugiyama (second round)
7. (Belarus) Natasha Zvereva (quarterfinals)
8. (Germany) Anke Huber (quarterfinals)

== Draw ==
=== Key ===
- Q = Qualifier
- WC = Wild card
- LL = Lucky loser
- Alt = Alternate
- SE = Special exempt
- PR = Protected ranking
- ITF = ITF entry
- JE = Junior exempt
- w/o = Walkover
- r = Retired
- d = Defaulted
- SR = Special ranking

=== Finals ===
Semifinals
WC	(Germany) Steffi Graf	6	3	6
3	(Belgium) Dominique Van Roost	1	6	0
4	(Romania) Irina Spîrlea	6	3	2
2	(France) Nathalie Tauziat	2	6	6

Final
WC	(Germany) Steffi Graf	6	6
2	(France) Nathalie Tauziat	3	4

=== Top half ===
First round
Q	(France) A-G Sidot	6	6
(France) A Mauresmo	3	3
WC	(Germany) S Graf	6	6
(Romania) R Dragomir	3	3
WC	(Germany) S Klösel	4	3
6	(Japan) A Sugiyama	6	6
(Croatia) I Majoli	6	6
(Zimbabwe) C Black	4	1
Q	(Austria) S Plischke	6	6
(United States) C Morariu	2	2
(Slovakia) H Nagyová	5	3
7	(Belarus) N Zvereva	7	6

Second round
1	(Spain) A Sánchez-Vicario	1	6	2
Q	(France) A-G Sidot	6	4	6
WC	(Germany) S Graf	6	6
6	(Japan) A Sugiyama	4	3
3	(Belgium) D Van Roost	6	6
(Croatia) I Majoli	4	4
Q	(Austria) S Plischke	1	7	4
7	(Belarus) N Zvereva	6	6	6

Quarterfinals
Q	(France) A-G Sidot	5	3
WC	(Germany) S Graf	7	6
3	(Belgium) D Van Roost	6	3	6
7	(Belarus) N Zvereva	3	6	2

Semifinals
WC	(Germany) S Graf	6	3	6
3	(Belgium) D Van Roost	1	6	0

=== Bottom half ===
First round
5	(South Africa) A Coetzer	6	4	6
Q	(Ukraine) E Tatarkova	4	6	4
WC	(Germany) B Rittner	3	4
(France) S Pitkowski	6	6
(Spain) M Serna	6	6
Q	(Italy) R Grande	2	1
8	(Germany) A Huber	6	6
(Italy) S Farina	4	2
(France) A Fusai	1	2
(Austria) B Schett	6	6
(Russia) E Likhovtseva	6	7
(Belgium) S Appelmans	1	5

Second round
5	(South Africa) A Coetzer	3	6
(France) S Pitkowski	6	7
(Spain) M Serna	6	3
4	(Romania) I Spîrlea	7	6
8	(Germany) A Huber	6	6
(Austria) B Schett	3	3
(Russia) E Likhovtseva	6	1
2	(France) N Tauziat	7	6

Quarterfinals
(France) S Pitkowski	1	1
4	(Romania) I Spîrlea	6	6
8	(Germany) A Huber	3	4
2	(France) N Tauziat	6	6

Semifinals
4	(Romania) I Spîrlea	6	3	2
2	(France) N Tauziat	2	6	6
