= 1998 Sparkassen Cup – Doubles =

Doubles
- 1998 Sparkassen Cup

Final
- Champions: (Russia) Elena Likhovtseva (Japan) Ai Sugiyama
- Runners-up: (Netherlands) Manon Bollegraf (Romania) Irina Spîrlea
- Score: 6–3, 6–7, 6–2

Events
Singles	Doubles
← 1997 ·	Sparkassen Cup	· 1999 →

The 1998 Sparkassen Cup doubles was the tennis doubles event of the ninth edition of the Sparkassen Cup; a WTA Tier II tournament held in Leipzig, Germany.

Martina Hingis and Jana Novotná were the defending champions but chose not to compete this year.

Fourth seeds, Elena Likhovtseva and Ai Sugiyama won the title, defeating Manon Bollegraf and Irina Spîrlea in the final, 6–3, 6–7, 6–2.

== Seeds ==
1. (Spain) Arantxa Sánchez-Vicario / (Belarus) Natasha Zvereva (quarterfinals)
2. (France) Alexandra Fusai / (France) Nathalie Tauziat (semifinals)
3. (United States) Katrina Adams / (Latvia) Larisa Neiland (first round)
4. (Russia) Elena Likhovtseva / (Japan) Ai Sugiyama (champions)

== Draw ==
=== Key ===
- Q = Qualifier
- WC = Wild card
- LL = Lucky loser
- Alt = Alternate
- SE = Special exempt
- PR = Protected ranking
- ITF = ITF entry
- JE = Junior exempt
- w/o = Walkover
- r = Retired
- d = Defaulted
- SR = Special ranking

First round
1	(Spain) A Sánchez-Vicario (Belarus) N Zvereva	7	6
WC	(Germany) M Buric (Germany) S Graf	5	4
(Austria) K Kschwendt (France) A-G Sidot	6	0	4
(Belgium) L Courtois (Austria) B Schett	3	6	6
4	(Russia) E Likhovtseva (Japan) A Sugiyama	4	7	6
(South Africa) A Coetzer (Germany) A Huber	6	6	1
(Slovenia) T Križan (Ukraine) O Lugina	4	6
Q	(Austria) S Plischke (Austria) P Wartusch	6	7
LL	(Germany) C Singer (Czech Republic) H Vildová	4	4
(Belgium) S Appelmans (Netherlands) M Oremans	6	6
(Netherlands) M Bollegraf (Romania) I Spîrlea	2	7	6
3	(United States) K Adams (Latvia) L Neiland	6	6	3
(Romania) R Dragomir (Croatia) I Majoli	7	1	7
(United States) C Morariu (Ukraine) E Tatarkova	5	6	5
(Italy) R Grande (Slovakia) K Habšudová	5	4
2	(France) A Fusai (France) N Tauziat	7	6

Quarterfinals
1	(Spain) A Sánchez-Vicario (Belarus) N Zvereva	4	6	3
(Belgium) L Courtois (Austria) B Schett	6	3	6
4	(Russia) E Likhovtseva (Japan) A Sugiyama	6	6
Q	(Austria) S Plischke (Austria) P Wartusch	2	2
(Belgium) S Appelmans (Netherlands) M Oremans	2	0
(Netherlands) M Bollegraf (Romania) I Spîrlea	6	6
(Romania) R Dragomir (Croatia) I Majoli	1	3
2	(France) A Fusai (France) N Tauziat	6	6

Semifinals
(Belgium) L Courtois (Austria) B Schett	1	2
4	(Russia) E Likhovtseva (Japan) A Sugiyama	6	6
(Netherlands) M Bollegraf (Romania) I Spîrlea	7	7
2	(France) A Fusai (France) N Tauziat	6	6

Final
4	(Russia) Elena Likhovtseva (Japan) Ai Sugiyama	6	6	6
(Netherlands) Manon Bollegraf (Romania) Irina Spîrlea	3	7	2
