= 2003 Sparkassen Cup (tennis) =

- Date: 22–28 September
- Edition: 14th
- Category: Tier II
- Draw: 28S / 16D
- Prize money: $585,000
- Surface: Hard / indoor
- Location: Leipzig, Germany

Champions

Singles
- (Russia) Anastasia Myskina

Doubles
- (Russia) Svetlana Kuznetsova (United States) Martina Navratilova
← 2002 ·	Sparkassen Cup

The 2003 Sparkassen Cup (tennis) was a women's tennis tournament played on indoor hard courts in Leipzig, Germany. It was part of the Tier II category of the 2003 WTA Tour. It was the 14th and last edition of the tournament and was held from 22 September until 28 September 2003. Third-seeded Anastasia Myskina won the singles title.

== Finals ==
=== Singles ===
- (Russia) Anastasia Myskina defeated (Belgium) Justine Henin-Hardenne, 3–6, 6–3, 6–3

=== Doubles ===
- (Russia) Svetlana Kuznetsova / (United States) Martina Navratilova defeated (Russia) Elena Likhovtseva / (Russia) Nadia Petrova, 3–6, 6–1, 6–3

== Singles main draw entrants ==
=== Seeds ===
Country	Player	Rank^{1}	Seed
BEL	Kim Clijsters	1	1
BEL	Justine Henin-Hardenne	2	2
RUS	Anastasia Myskina	10	3
BUL	Magdalena Maleeva	11	4
SVK	Daniela Hantuchová	12	5
RUS	Nadia Petrova	15	6
USA	Meghann Shaughnessy	17	7
ITA	Silvia Farina Elia	20	8

- ^{1} Rankings are as of 15 September 2003.

=== Other entrants ===
The following players received wildcards into the singles main draw:

- (Belgium) Elke Clijsters
- (Germany) Anna-Lena Grönefeld
- (Austria) Barbara Schett

The following players received entry from the singles qualifying draw:

- (Belgium) Els Callens
- (Czech Republic) Sandra Kleinová
- (Croatia) Jelena Kostanić
- (Venezuela) María Vento-Kabchi

== Doubles main draw entrants ==
=== Seeds ===
Country	Player	Country	Player	Rank^{1}	Seed
RUS	Svetlana Kuznetsova	USA	Martina Navratilova	15	1
RUS	Elena Likhovtseva	RUS	Nadia Petrova	24	2
BEL	Els Callens	SVK	Janette Husárová	41	3
FRA	Marion Bartoli	FR Yugoslavia	Jelena Dokic	47	4

- ^{1} Rankings as of 15 September 2003.

=== Other entrants ===
The following pairs received wildcards into the doubles main draw:

- (Germany) Vanessa Henke / (Germany) Caroline Schneider

The following players received entry from the singles qualifying draw:

- (Hungary) Anikó Kapros / (Germany) Lydia Steinbach
