= 1997 Sparkassen Cup =

- Date: 22–28 September
- Edition: 8th
- Category: Tier II
- Draw: 28S / 16D
- Prize money: $450,000
- Surface: Carpet / indoor
- Location: Leipzig, Germany

Champions

Singles
- (Czech Republic) Jana Novotná

Doubles
- (Switzerland) Martina Hingis / (Czech Republic) Jana Novotná
← 1996 ·	Sparkassen Cup	· 1998 →

The 1997 Sparkassen Cup was a women's tennis tournament played on indoor carpet courts in Leipzig, Germany that was part of the Tier II category of the 1997 WTA Tour. It was the eighth edition of the tournament and was held from 22 September until 28 September 1997. Second-seeded Jana Novotná won the singles title, her second at the event after 1994.

== Finals ==
=== Singles ===
(Czech Republic) Jana Novotná defeated (South Africa) Amanda Coetzer 6–2, 4–6, 6–3

- It was Novotná's 2nd singles title of the year and the 17th of her career.

=== Doubles ===
(Switzerland) Martina Hingis / (Czech Republic) Jana Novotná defeated (Indonesia) Yayuk Basuki / (Czech Republic) Helena Suková 6–2, 6–2

- It was Hingis' 6th doubles title of the year and the 9th of her career. It was Novotná's 5th doubles title of the year and the 66th of her career.
