= 1995 Sparkassen Cup – Doubles =

Doubles
- 1995 Sparkassen Cup

Final
- Champions: (United States) Meredith McGrath (Latvia) Larisa Neiland
- Runners-up: (Netherlands) Brenda Schultz-McCarthy (Netherlands) Caroline Vis
- Score: 6–4, 6–4

Details
- Draw: 16 (1Q)
- Seeds: 4

Events
Singles	Doubles
← 1994 ·	Sparkassen Cup	· 1996 →

Patty Fendick and Meredith McGrath were the defending champions, but Fendick did not compete this year.

McGrath teamed up with Larisa Neiland and successfully defended her title, by defeating Brenda Schultz-McCarthy and Caroline Vis 6–4, 6–4 in the final.

== Seeds ==
1. (United States) Meredith McGrath / (Latvia) Larisa Neiland (champions)
2. (United States) Nicole Arendt / (Netherlands) Manon Bollegraf (quarterfinals)
3. (Czech Republic) Jana Novotná / (Czech Republic) Helena Suková (semifinals)
4. (Netherlands) Brenda Schultz-McCarthy / (Netherlands) Caroline Vis (final)

== Draw ==
=== Key ===
- Q = Qualifier
- WC = Wild card
- LL = Lucky loser
- Alt = Alternate
- SE = Special exempt
- PR = Protected ranking
- ITF = ITF entry
- JE = Junior exempt
- w/o = Walkover
- r = Retired
- d = Defaulted
- SR = Special ranking

=== Draw ===
First round
1	(United States) M McGrath (Latvia) L Neiland	6	6
(Bulgaria) K Maleeva (United States) M Werdel-Witmeyer	2	4
(Sweden) Å Carlsson (Romania) R Dragomir	6	6^{5}	1
(Belgium) S Appelmans (Netherlands) O Oremans	3	7^{7}	6
3	(Czech Republic) J Novotná (Czech Republic) H Suková	6	6
Q	(Germany) P Begerow (Germany) S Schmidle	1	0
(Czech Republic) E Martincová (Poland) M Mróz	4	1
(Russia) E Likhovtseva (Germany) C Schneider	6	6
(Belgium) E Callens (Belgium) L Courtois	6^{4}	6	7^{7}
(United States) L Lee (Germany) M Weingärtner	7^{7}	2	6^{4}
(South Africa) J Kruger (Germany) B Rittner	6^{2}	4
4	(Netherlands) B Schultz-McCarthy (Netherlands) C Vis	7^{7}	6
(Germany) W Probst (Germany) C Singer	6	6
(United Kingdom) J Pullin (United Kingdom) A Wainwright	3	4
(Sweden) M Lindström (Sweden) M Strandlund	6^{5}	3
2	(United States) N Arendt (Netherlands) M Bollegraf	7^{7}	6

Quarterfinals
1	(United States) M McGrath (Latvia) L Neiland	7	7
(Belgium) S Appelmans (Netherlands) O Oremans	5	5
3	(Czech Republic) J Novotná (Czech Republic) H Suková	6	6
(Russia) E Likhovtseva (Germany) C Schneider	4	2
(Belgium) E Callens (Belgium) L Courtois	7	1	1
4	(Netherlands) B Schultz-McCarthy (Netherlands) C Vis	5	6	6
(Germany) W Probst (Germany) C Singer	5	6	7^{9}
2	(United States) N Arendt (Netherlands) M Bollegraf	7	2	9^{7}

Semifinals
1	(United States) M McGrath (Latvia) L Neiland	6	3	7
3	(Czech Republic) J Novotná (Czech Republic) H Suková	4	6	5
4	(Netherlands) B Schultz-McCarthy (Netherlands) C Vis	6	6
(Germany) W Probst (Germany) C Singer	3	3

Final
1	(United States) M McGrath (Latvia) L Neiland	6	6
4	(Netherlands) B Schultz-McCarthy (Netherlands) C Vis	4	4
