= 2002 Sparkassen Cup – Doubles =

Doubles
- 2002 Sparkassen Cup

Final
- Champions: (United States) Alexandra Stevenson (United States) Serena Williams
- Runners-up: (Slovakia) Janette Husárová (Argentina) Paola Suárez
- Score: 6–3, 7–5

Details
- Draw: 16
- Seeds: 4

Events
| Singles | Doubles |
| ← 2001 · | Sparkassen Cup | · 2003 → |

The 2002 Sparkassen Cup doubles was the tennis doubles event of the thirteenth edition of the Sparkassen Cup; a WTA Tier II tournament held in Leipzig, Germany.

Elena Likhovtseva and Nathalie Tauziat were the defending champions but Tauziat chose not to compete in 2002. Likhovtseva partnered with Natasha Zvereva but they were defeated in the semifinals.

Unseeded American pairing Alexandra Stevenson and Serena Williams won the title, defeating Janette Husárová and Paola Suárez in the final, 6–3, 7–5. This title remains the only doubles title won by Serena Williams not partnered with older sister Venus.

== Seeds ==
1. (Slovakia) Janette Husárová / (Argentina) Paola Suárez (final)
2. (Belgium) Kim Clijsters / (Federal Republic of Yugoslavia) Jelena Dokic (first round)
3. (Italy) Rita Grande / (United States) Meghann Shaughnessy (first round)
4. (Slovenia) Tina Križan / (Slovenia) Katarina Srebotnik (second round)

== Draw ==
=== Key ===
- Q = Qualifier
- WC = Wild card
- LL = Lucky loser
- Alt = Alternate
- ITF = ITF entry
- PR = Protected ranking
- SR = Special ranking
- SE = Special exempt
- JE = Junior exempt
- JR = Junior Accelerator Programme entrant
- CO = College Accelerator Programme entrant
- NG = Next Gen Accelerator Program entrant
- w/o = Walkover
- r = Retired
- d = Defaulted

First round
1 | (Slovakia) Janette Husárová (Argentina) Paola Suárez | 6 | 6
(Hungary) Zsófia Gubacsi (Italy) Francesca Schiavone | 4 | 1
(South Africa) Nannie De Villiers (Czech Republic) Eva Martincová | 6^{5} | 7^{7} | 3
(Russia) Nadia Petrova (Spain) Magüi Serna | 7^{7} | 6^{2} | 6
3 | (Italy) Rita Grande (United States) Meghann Shaughnessy | 4 | 2
(Russia) Elena Likhovtseva (Belarus) Natasha Zvereva | 6 | 6
(Australia) Catherine Barclay (Germany) Martina Müller | 6 | 6
WC | (Germany) Anca Barna (Germany) Vanessa Henke | 3 | 4
(Russia) Elena Bovina (Belgium) Justine Henin | 4 | 6 | 1
WC | (United States) Alexandra Stevenson (United States) Serena Williams | 6 | 3 | 6
Q | (Czech Republic) Iveta Benešová (Czech Republic) Olga Blahotová | 6 | 3 | 0
4 | (Slovenia) Tina Križan (Slovenia) Katarina Srebotnik | 3 | 6 | 6
(France) Nathalie Dechy (Germany) Barbara Rittner | 6 | 5 | 4
(Greece) Eleni Daniilidou (Netherlands) Caroline Vis | 1 | 7 | 6
(Germany) Andrea Glass (Czech Republic) Květa Hrdličková | 6 | 6
2 | (Belgium) Kim Clijsters (Federal Republic of Yugoslavia) Jelena Dokic | 3 | 4

Quarterfinals
1 | (Slovakia) J Husárová (Argentina) P Suárez | 6^{6} | 6 | 6
(Russia) N Petrova (Spain) M Serna | 7^{8} | 2 | 4
(Russia) E Likhovtseva (Belarus) N Zvereva | 6 | 6
(Australia) Catherine Barclay (Germany) M Müller | 3 | 4
WC | (United States) A Stevenson (United States) S Williams | 6 | 6
4 | (Slovenia) T Križan (Slovenia) K Srebotnik | 2 | 2
(Greece) E Daniilidou (Netherlands) C Vis | 6 | 4 | 6
(Germany) A Glass (Czech Republic) K Hrdličková | 3 | 6 | 2

Semifinals
1 | (Slovakia) J Husárová (Argentina) P Suárez | 6 | 6
(Russia) E Likhovtseva (Belarus) N Zvereva | 2 | 3
WC | (United States) A Stevenson (United States) S Williams | 6 | 6
(Greece) E Daniilidou (Netherlands) C Vis | 3 | 1

Final
1 | (Slovakia) J Husárová (Argentina) P Suárez | 3 | 5
WC | (United States) A Stevenson (United States) S Williams | 6 | 7
