= 1996 Sparkassen Cup – Singles =

Singles
- 1996 Sparkassen Cup

Final
- Champion: (Germany) Anke Huber
- Runner-up: (Croatia) Iva Majoli
- Score: 5–7, 6–3, 6–1

Details
- Draw: 28
- Seeds: 8

Events
Singles	Doubles
← 1995 ·	Sparkassen Cup	· 1997 →

The 1996 Sparkassen Cup singles was the tennis singles event of the seventh edition of the Sparkassen Cup; a WTA Tier II tournament held in Leipzig, Germany.

Anke Huber successfully defended her title, defeating Iva Majoli in the final, 5–7, 6–3, 6–1.

== Seeds ==
The top four seeds received a bye to the second round.

1. (Germany) Steffi Graf (semifinals)
2. (Spain) Arantxa Sánchez Vicario (quarterfinals)
3. (Croatia) Iva Majoli (semifinals)
4. (Germany) Anke Huber (champion)
5. (United States) Lindsay Davenport (quarterfinals)
6. (Bulgaria) Magdalena Maleeva (quarterfinals)
7. (Austria) Barbara Paulus (first round)
8. (Slovakia) Karina Habšudová (second round)

== Draw ==
=== Key ===
- Q = Qualifier
- WC = Wild card
- LL = Lucky loser
- Alt = Alternate
- SE = Special exempt
- PR = Protected ranking
- ITF = ITF entry
- JE = Junior exempt
- w/o = Walkover
- r = Retired
- d = Defaulted
- SR = Special ranking

=== Finals ===
Semifinals
1	(Germany) Steffi Graf
4	(Germany) Anke Huber	w/o
3	(Croatia) Iva Majoli	7	6
(Czech Republic) Helena Suková	5	4

Final
4	(Germany) Anke Huber	5	6	6
3	(Croatia) Iva Majoli	7	3	1

=== Top half ===
First round
(United States) K Po	5	6	6
(France) N Tauziat	7	2	3
(Sweden) Å Carlsson	2	6
Q	(United Kingdom) S Smith	6	7
(Austria) J Wiesner	2	6	6
7	(Austria) B Paulus	6	3	3
WC	(Croatia) S Talaja	1	2
(Romania) R Dragomir	6	6
(Italy) G Pizzichini	2	2
(Belgium) S Appelmans	6	6
Q	(Ukraine) N Medvedeva	4	3
6	(Bulgaria) M Maleeva	6	6

Second round
1	(Germany) S Graf	6	6
(United States) K Po	0	1
Q	(United Kingdom) S Smith	1	2
(Austria) J Wiesner	6	6
4	(Germany) A Huber	6	6
(Romania) R Dragomir	1	2
(Belgium) S Appelmans	3	4
6	(Bulgaria) M Maleeva	6	6

Quarterfinals
1	(Germany) S Graf	1	6	6
(Austria) J Wiesner	6	3	2
4	(Germany) A Huber	6	7
6	(Bulgaria) M Maleeva	4	6

Semifinals
1	(Germany) S Graf
4	(Germany) A Huber	w/o

=== Bottom half ===
First round
5	(United States) L Davenport	6	7
(Austria) B Schett	4	5
Q	(Belgium) E Callens	6	6
(Netherlands) K Boogert	4	4
(Italy) S Farina	7	6
WC	(Germany) K Kschwendt	5	2
8	(Slovakia) K Habšudová	6	6
(Russia) E Likhovtseva	1	1
Q	(France) A-G Sidot	5	3
(Czech Republic) H Suková	7	6
(Slovakia) K Studeníková	5	2
(Netherlands) M Oremans	7	6

Second round
5	(United States) L Davenport	7	6
Q	(Belgium) E Callens	6	1
(Italy) S Farina	4	2
3	(Croatia) I Majoli	6	6
8	(Slovakia) K Habšudová	5	7	2
(Czech Republic) H Suková	7	6	6
(Netherlands) M Oremans	2	1
2	(Spain) A Sánchez Vicario	6	6

Quarterfinals
5	(United States) L Davenport	7	6	6
3	(Croatia) I Majoli	6	7	7
(Czech Republic) H Suková	6	7
2	(Spain) A Sánchez Vicario	3	6

Semifinals
3	(Croatia) I Majoli	7	6
(Czech Republic) H Suková	5	4
