= 2002 Sparkassen Cup (tennis) =

- Date: 23–29 September
- Edition: 13th
- Category: Tier II
- Draw: 28S / 16D
- Prize money: $585,000
- Surface: Hard / indoor
- Location: Leipzig, Germany

Champions

Singles
- (United States) Serena Williams

Doubles
- (United States) Serena Williams (United States) Alexandra Stevenson
- Sparkassen Cup

The 2002 Sparkassen Cup (tennis) was a women's tennis tournament played on indoor hard courts in Leipzig, Germany. It was part of the Tier II category of the 2002 WTA Tour. It was the 13th edition of the tournament and was held from 23 September until 29 September 2002. First-seeded Serena Williams won the singles title and earned $93,000 first-prize money.

== Finals ==
=== Singles ===
- (United States) Serena Williams defeated (Russia) Anastasia Myskina, 6–3, 6–2

=== Doubles ===
- (United States) Alexandra Stevenson / (United States) Serena Williams defeated (Slovakia) Janette Husárová / (Argentina) Paola Suárez, 6–3, 7–5

== Singles main draw entrants ==
=== Seeds ===
Country	Player	Rank^{1}	Seed
USA	Serena Williams	1	1
FR Yugoslavia	Jelena Dokic	4	2
BEL	Justine Henin	7	3
BEL	Kim Clijsters	8	4
SVK	Daniela Hantuchová	11	5
RUS	Anastasia Myskina	12	6
ITA	Silvia Farina Elia	14	7
BUL	Magdalena Maleeva	17	8

- ^{1} Rankings are as of 16 September 2002.

=== Other entrants ===
The following players received wildcards into the singles main draw:

- (Belgium) Elke Clijsters
- (Germany) Martina Müller
- (Germany) Barbara Rittner

The following players received entry from the singles qualifying draw:

- (Germany) Anca Barna
- (Czech Republic) Iveta Benešová
- (Czech Republic) Denisa Chládková
- (Czech Republic) Květa Hrdlickova

== Doubles main draw entrants ==
=== Seeds ===
Country	Player	Country	Player	Rank^{1}	Seed
SVK	Janette Husárová	ARG	Paola Suárez	6	1
BEL	Kim Clijsters	FR Yugoslavia	Jelena Dokic	42	2
ITA	Rita Grande	USA	Meghann Shaughnessy	62	3
SLO	Tina Križan	SLO	Katarina Srebotnik	64	4

- ^{1} Rankings as of 16 September 2002.

=== Other entrants ===
The following pairs received wildcards into the doubles main draw:

- (Germany) Anca Barna / (Germany) Vanessa Henke
- (United States) Alexandra Stevenson / (United States) Serena Williams
