= 2002 Sparkassen Cup – Singles =

Singles
- 2002 Sparkassen Cup

Final
- Champion: (United States) Serena Williams
- Runner-up: (Russia) Anastasia Myskina
- Score: 6–3, 6–2

Details
- Draw: 28
- Seeds: 8

Events
Singles	Doubles
← 2001 ·	Sparkassen Cup	· 2003 →

The 2002 Sparkassen Cup singles was the tennis singles event of the thirteenth edition of the Sparkassen Cup; a WTA Tier II tournament held in Leipzig, Germany. Kim Clijsters was the two-time defending champion but lost in the semifinal to Anastasia Myskina.

World No.1 Serena Williams beat Anastasia Myskina 6–3, 6–2 in the final. Myskina would go on to win the title the following year.

== Seeds ==
The top four seeds received a bye to the second round.

1. (United States) Serena Williams (champion)
2. (Federal Republic of Yugoslavia) Jelena Dokic (second round)
3. (Belgium) Justine Henin (semifinals)
4. (Belgium) Kim Clijsters (semifinals)
5. (Slovakia) Daniela Hantuchová (quarterfinals)
6. (Russia) Anastasia Myskina (final)
7. (Italy) Silvia Farina Elia (second round)
8. (Bulgaria) Magdalena Maleeva (first round)

== Draw ==
=== Key ===
- Q = Qualifier
- WC = Wild card
- LL = Lucky loser
- Alt = Alternate
- SE = Special exempt
- PR = Protected ranking
- ITF = ITF entry
- JE = Junior exempt
- w/o = Walkover
- r = Retired
- d = Defaulted
- SR = Special ranking

=== Finals ===
Semifinals
1	(United States) Serena Williams	6	6
3	(Belgium) Justine Henin	4	2
4	(Belgium) Kim Clijsters	4	7	6^{3}
6	(Russia) Anastasia Myskina	6	5	7^{7}

Final
1	(United States) Serena Williams	6	6
6	(Russia) Anastasia Myskina	3	2

=== Top half ===
First round
Q	(Germany) Anca Barna	6	6
WC	(Belgium) Elke Clijsters	4	2
(United States) Alexandra Stevenson	6	4	6
Q	(Czech Republic) Denisa Chládková	4	6	2
(Slovakia) Janette Husárová	3	6	6
8	(Bulgaria) Magdalena Maleeva	6	2	3
Q	(Czech Republic) Iveta Benešová	6	6
(Argentina) Paola Suárez	3	1
(Croatia) Iva Majoli	6^{4}	1
(Italy) Rita Grande	7^{7}	6
(Slovenia) Katarina Srebotnik	6	3	3
5	(Russia) Daniela Hantuchová	4	6	6

Second round
1	(United States) S Williams	6	3	6
Q	(Germany) A Barna	1	6	1
(United States) A Stevenson	6	6^{2}	6^{6}
(Czech Republic) J Husárová	1	7^{7}	7^{8}
3	(Belgium) J Henin	6^{4}	7^{7}	6
Q	(Czech Republic) I Benešová	7^{7}	6^{5}	2
(Italy) R Grande	4	6	6^{3}
5	(Slovakia) D Hantuchová	6	2	7^{7}

Quarterfinals
1	(United States) S Williams	6	6
(Slovakia) J Husárová	3	3
3	(Belgium) J Henin	6	7
5	(Slovakia) D Hantuchová	4	5

Semifinals
1	(United States) S Williams	6	6
3	(Belgium) J Henin	4	2

=== Bottom half ===
First round
7	(Italy) Silvia Farina Elia	6	6^{2}	6
(Italy) Francesca Schiavone	4	7^{7}	2
(Greece) Eleni Daniilidou	3	6	6^{1}
WC	(Germany) Barbara Rittner	6	3	7^{7}
WC	(Germany) Martina Müller	3	1
(Russia) Nadia Petrova	6	6
6	(Russia) Anastasia Myskina	2	6	6
(France) Nathalie Dechy	6	1	3
(Czech Republic) Dája Bedáňová	2	1^{r}
Q	(Czech Republic) Květa Hrdličková	6	2	0
(Russia) Elena Likhovtseva	3	6	2
Q	(United States) Meghann Shaughnessy	6	3	6

Second round
7	(Italy) S Farina Elia	6	4	3
WC	(Germany) B Rittner	4	6	6
(Russia) N Petrova	4	2
4	(Belgium) K Clijsters	6	6
6	(Russia) A Myskina	6	3	6
Q	(Czech Republic) K Hrdličková	4	6	1
Q	(United States) M Shaughnessy	6	6
2	(Federal Republic of Yugoslavia) Jelena Dokic	2	4

Quarterfinals
WC	(Germany) B Rittner	1	0
4	(Belgium) K Clijsters	6	6
6	(Russia) A Myskina	6	7
Q	(United States) M Shaughnessy	4	5

Semifinals
4	(Belgium) K Clijsters	4	7	6^{3}
6	(Russia) A Myskina	6	5	7^{7}
