= 2000 Sparkassen Cup (tennis) =

- Date: 30 October – 5 November
- Edition: 11th
- Category: Tier II
- Draw: 28S / 16D
- Prize money: USD535,000
- Surface: Hard / Indoor
- Location: Leipzig, Germany

Champions

Singles
- (Belgium) Kim Clijsters

Doubles
- (Spain) Arantxa Sánchez Vicario / (France) Anne-Gaëlle Sidot
- Sparkassen Cup

The 2000 Sparkassen Cup was a tennis tournament played on indoor hard courts in Leipzig, Germany. It was part of the Tier II category of the 2000 WTA Tour. It was the 11th edition of the tournament and was held from 30 October through 5 November 2000. Unseeded Kim Clijsters won the singles title and earned $87,000 first-prize money.

== Finals ==
=== Singles ===
- (Belgium) Kim Clijsters defeated (Russia) Elena Likhovtseva, 7–6^{(8–6)}, 4–6, 6–4.

It was the 2nd title of the season for Clijsters and the 3rd title of her singles career.

=== Doubles ===
- (Spain) Arantxa Sánchez Vicario / (France) Anne-Gaëlle Sidot defeated (Belgium) Kim Clijsters / (Belgium) Laurence Courtois, 6–7^{(8–6)}, 7–5, 6–3.

It was the 61st title for Sánchez Vicario and the 1st title for Sidot in their respective doubles careers.

== Prize money ==
Event	W	F	SF	QF	Round of 16	Round of 32	Q3	Q2	Q1
Singles	$87,000	$43,500	$21,750	$11,000	$7,600	$4,000	$1,950	$1,300	$825
Doubles *	$27,000	$13,800	$8,400	$4,500	$2,400	—N/a	—N/a	—N/a	—N/a

_{* per team}

== Singles main draw entrants ==
=== Seeds ===
Country	Player	Rank	Seed
FRA	Nathalie Tauziat	8	1
ESP	Arantxa Sánchez Vicario	9	2
RUS	Anna Kournikova	11	3
RUS	Elena Dementieva	18	4
BUL	Magdalena Maleeva	22	5
AUT	Barbara Schett	24	6
RUS	Elena Likhovtseva	25	7
AUS	Jelena Dokic	27	8

=== Other entrants ===
The following players received wildcards into the singles main draw:

- (Germany) Jana Kandarr
- (Croatia) Iva Majoli
- (Germany) Barbara Rittner

The following players received entry from the singles qualifying draw:

- (Austria) Evelyn Fauth
- (Germany) Andrea Glass
- (Slovakia) Janette Husárová
- (Federal Republic of Yugoslavia) Sandra Načuk

== Doubles main draw entrants ==
=== Seeds ===
Country	Player	Country	Player	Rank	Seed
FRA	Alexandra Fusai	FRA	Nathalie Tauziat	27	1
ESP	Arantxa Sánchez Vicario	FRA	Anne-Gaëlle Sidot	40	2
NED	Nicole Arendt	NED	Manon Bollegraf	49	3
ROM	Cătălina Cristea	RUS	Elena Likhovtseva	69	4

=== Other entrants ===
The following pair received a wildcard into the doubles main draw:

- (Russia) Elena Dementieva / (Germany) Jana Kandarr

The following pair received entry from the doubles qualifying draw:

- (Slovenia) Maja Matevžič / (Germany) Caroline Schneider
