= 2001 Sparkassen Cup – Doubles =

Doubles
- 2001 Sparkassen Cup

Final
- Champions: (Russia) Elena Likhovtseva (France) Nathalie Tauziat
- Runners-up: (Czech Republic) Květa Hrdlickova (Germany) Barbara Rittner
- Score: 6–4, 6–2

Events
Singles	Doubles
- Sparkassen Cup

The 2001 Sparkassen Cup doubles was the tennis doubles event of the twelfth edition of the Sparkassen Cup; a WTA Tier II tournament held in Leipzig, Germany.

Arantxa Sánchez Vicario and Anne-Gaëlle Sidot were the defending champions but chose not to compete this year.

Elena Likhovtseva and Nathalie Tauziat won the title, defeating Květa Hrdličková and Barbara Rittner in the final, 6–4, 6–2.

== Seeds ==
1. (Russia) Elena Likhovtseva / (France) Nathalie Tauziat (champions)
2. (Belgium) Kim Clijsters / (Federal Republic of Yugoslavia) Jelena Dokic (semifinals)
3. (Slovakia) Henrieta Nagyová / (Austria) Barbara Schett (withdrew)
4. (Slovakia) Karina Habšudová / (Ukraine) Elena Tatarkova (quarterfinals)

== Draw ==
Key

- Q = Qualifier
- WC = Wild card
- LL = Lucky loser
- Alt = Alternate
- ITF = ITF entry
- PR = Protected ranking
- SR = Special ranking
- SE = Special exempt
- JE = Junior exempt
- JR = Junior Accelerator Programme entrant
- CO = College Accelerator Programme entrant
- NG = Next Gen Accelerator Program entrant
- w/o = Walkover
- r = Retired
- d = Defaulted

=== Draw ===
First round
1	(Russia) E Likhovtseva (France) N Tauziat	6	6
(Germany) V Henke (France) V Razzano	3	4
(Argentina) L Montalvo (Spain) M Serna	7^{7}	4	4
(Italy) S Farina Elia (Netherlands) M Oremans	6^{3}	6	6
(South Africa) N de Villiers (Czech Republic) E Martincová	7	6
(Sweden) Å Carlsson (Belgium) L Courtois	5	3
(Germany) A Bachmann (Hungary) P Mandula	2	6	5
(Czech Republic) K Hrdličková (Germany) B Rittner	6	3	7
(Russia) N Petrova (Uzbekistan) I Tulyaganova	6	3	4
4	(Slovakia) K Habšudová (Ukraine) E Tatarkova	4	6	6
WC	(Germany) M Müller (Croatia) S Talaja	7	1	6
(Slovenia) M Matevžič (Spain) C Torrens Valero	5	6	3
(Czech Republic) D Bedáňová (Germany) A Glass	6	1	2
2	(Belgium) K Clijsters (Federal Republic of Yugoslavia) J Dokic	3	6	6

Quarterfinals
1	(Russia) E Likhovtseva (France) N Tauziat	6	3	6
(Italy) S Farina Elia (Netherlands) M Oremans	3	6	2
Q	(Spain) M Marrero (Italy) F Schiavone	5	3
(South Africa) N de Villiers (Czech Republic) E Martincová	7	6
(Czech Republic) K Hrdličková (Germany) B Rittner	6	6
4	(Slovakia) K Habšudová (Ukraine) E Tatarkova	3	3
WC	(Germany) M Müller (Croatia) S Talaja	1	2
2	(Belgium) K Clijsters (Federal Republic of Yugoslavia) J Dokic	6	6

Semifinals
1	(Russia) E Likhovtseva (France) N Tauziat	6	6
(South Africa) N de Villiers (Czech Republic) E Martincová	1	3
(Czech Republic) K Hrdličková (Germany) B Rittner	4	7	6
2	(Belgium) K Clijsters (Federal Republic of Yugoslavia) J Dokic	6	5	4

Final
1	(Russia) E Likhovtseva (France) N Tauziat	6	6
(Czech Republic) K Hrdličková (Germany) B Rittner	4	2
