= Višnja Vuletić =

Serbian tennis player and coach

Višnja Vuletić Popović Вишња Вулетић Поповић
- Country (sports): Serbia and Montenegro (1998–2006) / Serbia (2006–2009)
- Born: January 7, 1982 (age 44) Belgrade, SR Serbia, SFR Yugoslavia
- Retired: 2009
- Plays: Right-handed (two handed-backhand)
- Prize money: $13,777

Singles
- Highest ranking: No. 648 (7 May 2001)

Doubles
- Highest ranking: No. 280 (11 June 2001)

Višnja Vuletić Popović (Serbian Cyrillic: Вишња Вулетић Поповић; born 7 January 1982) is a Serbian tennis coach and former professional tennis player.

Vuletić made her only WTA Tour main draw appearance at the 2000 EuroTel Slovak Indoor, partnering Belarusian Olga Barabanschikova in the doubles. But First Round lost Slovak Ľubomíra Kurhajcová and Eva Fislová.

After Vuletić retired from professional tennis, she continued to work as a tennis coach. She works with players from all over the world, including WTA players, with the tennis academy that she names.

== ITF finals ==
Legend
$10,000 tournaments

=== Doubles: 3 (1–2) ===
Outcome	No.	Date	Tournament	Surface	Partner	Opponents	Score
Winner	1.	25 June 2000	Easton, United States	Hard	(United States) Katrina Nimmers	(United States) Whitney Laiho (United States) Janet Walker	6–4, 6–4
Runner–up	2.	4 August 2002	Dublin, Ireland	Grass	(United Kingdom) Rebecca Rankin	(United Kingdom) Anna Hawkins (Australia) Nicole Kriz	2–6, 5–7
Runner–up	3.	1 June 2003	Campobasso, Italy	Clay	(Serbia) Ana Jovanović	(New Zealand) Leanne Baker (Russia) Ekaterina Kozhokina	1–6, 1–6
