= Lydia Steinbach =

German tennis player

- Country (sports): Germany
- Born: 30 July 1980 (age 44); Karl-Marx-Stadt (Chemnitz), East Germany
- Retired: 2010
- Plays: Right-handed
- Prize money: $54,314

Singles
- Career record: 141-99
- Career titles: 1 ITF
- Highest ranking: No. 262 (27 August 2001)

Doubles
- Career record: 88-53
- Career titles: 10 ITF
- Highest ranking: No. 176 (4 February 2002)

Lydia Steinbach (born 30 July 1980) is a German former professional tennis player.

== Biography ==
Steinbach was born in the city of Chemnitz, which was then known as Karl-Marx-Stadt and part of East Germany.

A right-handed player, Steinbach reached a best singles ranking of 262. In 2001 she won an ITF tournament in San Severo, beating Svetlana Kuznetsova in the final. Her best performance on the WTA Tour came at the Pattaya Open in 2003, where she made the round of 16.

As a doubles player she won 10 ITF titles and was ranked as high as 176 in the world. At the 2003 Sparkassen Cup in Leipzig, Steinbach and partner Aniko Kapros held a match point against top seeds Martina Navratilova and Svetlana Kuznetsova, before going down 5–7 in the third set.

While studying sports at university she was a participant in the 2003 Summer Universiade in Daegu, winning bronze medals for both the women's doubles and mixed doubles events.

== ITF finals ==
=== Singles (1–6) ===
Legend
$25,000 tournaments
$10,000 tournaments

Result	No.	Date	Tournament	Surface	Opponent	Score
Loss	1.	9 August 1998	Rebecq, Belgium	Clay	(Belgium) Daphne van de Zande	1–6, 3–6
Loss	2.	13 June 1999	Meinerzhagen, Germany	Clay	(Germany) Martina Müller	0–6, 2–6
Loss	3.	16 October 2000	Joué-lès-Tours, France	Hard (i)	(Madagascar) Dally Randriantefy	0–4, 1–4
Loss	4.	4 February 2001	Tipton, United Kingdom	Clay	(France) Anne-Laure Heitz	4–6, 6–3, 6–7^{(2–7)}
Win	5.	29 April 2001	San Severo, Italy	Clay	(Russia) Svetlana Kuznetsova	2–6, 7–6^{(5)}, 6–3
Loss	6.	13 July 2003	Darmstadt, Germany	Clay	(Czech Republic) Alena Vašková	3–6, 1–6
Loss	7.	24 July 2006	Horb, Germany	Clay	(Bosnia and Herzegovina) Sandra Martinović	6–3, 1–6, 4–6

=== Doubles (10–7) ===
Result	No.	Date	Tournament	Surface	Partner	Opponents	Score
Win	1.	28 September 1998	Glasgow, Great Britain	Carpet (i)	(Denmark) Eva Dyrberg	(United Kingdom) Helen Crook (United Kingdom) Victoria Davies	6–4, 5–7, 6–3
Win	2.	16 November 1998	Biel, Switzerland	Hard (i)	(Czech Republic) Dája Bedáňová	(Germany) Gréta Arn (Hungary) Katalin Miskolczi	6–2, 6–1
Loss	3.	13 June 1999	Meinerzhagen, Germany	Clay	(Germany) Jennifer Tinnacher	(Germany) Bianca Cremer (Germany) Nicole Seitenbecher	6–7, 0–6
Win	4.	12 February 2001	Sutton, United Kingdom	Hard (i)	(Greece) Eleni Daniilidou	(Netherlands) Amanda Hopmans (Belgium) Patty Van Acker	6–0, 6–4
Win	5.	15 July 2001	Darmstadt, Germany	Clay	(Germany) Magdalena Kučerová	(Czech Republic) Milena Nekvapilová (Czech Republic) Hana Šromová	6–1, 6–2
Win	6.	6 August 2001	Hechingen, Germany	Clay	(Germany) Magdalena Kučerová	(Austria) Daniela Klemenschits (Austria) Sandra Klemenschits	5–7, 6–2, 6–1
Win	7.	22 October 2001	Opole, Poland	Carpet	(Germany) Magdalena Kučerová	(Czech Republic) Milena Nekvapilová (Czech Republic) Hana Šromová	6–3, 6–2
Loss	8.	5 August 2002	Hechingen, Germany	Clay	(New Zealand) Shelley Stephens	(Germany) Andrea Glass (Germany) Jasmin Wöhr	4–6, 5–7
Loss	9.	12 August 2002	Innsbruck, Austria	Clay	(Germany) Magdalena Kučerová	(Russia) Goulnara Fattakhetdinova (Russia) Maria Kondratieva	4–6, 6–4, 3–6
Win	10.	1 September 2002	Bielefeld, Germany	Clay	(Germany) Lisa Fritz	(Slovakia) Martina Babáková (Slovakia) Lenka Tvarošková	7–5, 6–4
Loss	11.	14 July 2003	Garching bei München, Germany	Clay	(Germany) Antonia Matic	(Germany) Angelika Bachmann (Czech Republic) Lenka Němečková	2–6, 6–7^{(7–9)}
Loss	12.	3 August 2003	Saulgau, Germany	Clay	(Germany) Antonia Matic	(Germany) Christina Fitz (Germany) Kathrin Wörle-Scheller	2–6, 1–6
Loss	13.	24 July 2006	Horb, Germany	Clay	(Germany) Julia Görges	(Croatia) Josipa Bek (Bulgaria) Dia Evtimova	6–3, 3–6, 3–6
Win	14.	6 August 2006	Saulgau, Germany	Clay	(Croatia) Josipa Bek	(Slovakia) Martina Babáková (Slovakia) Linda Smolenaková	6–4, 6–3
Loss	15.	4 September 2006	Düsseldorf, Germany	Clay	(Germany) Korina Perkovic	(Germany) Franziska Etzel (Germany) Laura Zelder	1–6, 7–6^{(9–7)}, 2–6
Win	16.	6 November 2006	Ismaning, Germany	Carpet (i)	(Austria) Eva-Maria Hoch	(Germany) Sabrina Jolk (Germany) Annette Kolb	6–2, 6–1
Win	17.	24 August 2008	Wahlstedt, Germany	Clay	(Germany) Julia Paetow	(Germany) Dominice Ripoll (Spain) Lucía Sainz	6–4, 6–4
