= Anke Huber =

German tennis player (born 1974)

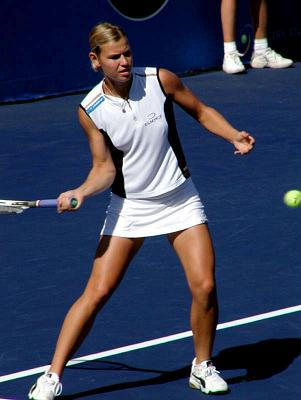
- Country (sports): Germany
- Born: 4 December 1974 (age 51) Bruchsal, West Germany
- Height: 1.73 m (5 ft 8 in)
- Turned pro: 1989
- Retired: 31 October 2001
- Plays: Right-handed (two-handed backhand)
- Prize money: $4,768,292

Singles
- Career record: 447–225 (66.5%)
- Career titles: 12 WTA, 2 ITF
- Highest ranking: No. 4 (14 October 1996)

Grand Slam singles results
- Australian Open: F (1996)
- French Open: SF (1993)
- Wimbledon: 4R (1991, 1993, 1995, 2000, 2001)
- US Open: QF (1999, 2000)

Other tournaments
- Tour Finals: F (1995)
- Olympic Games: QF (1992)

Doubles
- Career record: 130–129
- Career titles: 1
- Highest ranking: No. 23 (9 February 1998)

Grand Slam doubles results
- Australian Open: 3R (1996, 1997, 1998)
- French Open: SF (1992)
- Wimbledon: 3R (1992, 2000)
- US Open: QF (2000)

Team competitions
- Fed Cup: W (1992)
- Hopman Cup: W (1995 with Boris Becker)

Anke Huber (born 4 December 1974) is a German retired professional tennis player. She was the runner-up in women's singles at the 1996 Australian Open and the 1995 WTA Finals. Huber won 12 singles and one doubles title on the WTA Tour. She finished inside the top 20 for 10 seasons and achieved a career-high ranking of No.4 in October 1996.

== Early life ==
Huber was born in Bruchsal, Baden-Württemberg. She started playing tennis at the age of 7 after being introduced to the game by her father, Edgar. In junior competition, she won the under-12 German Championships in 1986, the under-14s in 1987, the under-16s in 1988, and the European Championships in 1989. She was also a semifinalist at Wimbledon's junior tournament in 1990.

== Career ==
Huber made her Grand Slam tournament debut at the 1990 Australian Open, a year before she graduated from high school. After defeating Maider Laval and Elise Burgin, she was defeated in the third round by 13th-seeded Raffaella Reggi. In August 1990, she defeated Marianne Werdel Witmeyer to win the Schenectady tournament, a warm-up for the US Open. Jennifer Capriati then defeated Huber in the first round of that tournament 7–5, 7–5. Huber was the runner-up in her next event, losing in Bayonne to Nathalie Tauziat in straight sets. She finished 1990 ranked world No. 34.

Huber became Germany's top female tennis player upon Steffi Graf's retirement in 1999. Two years later, Huber retired, citing a persistent ankle injury and the desire for a "normal life" as the reasons for her retirement. She planned to quit after the 2002 Australian Open, her favourite tournament, but changed her mind when she unexpectedly qualified for the year-ending Sanex Championships in Germany. "I thought there's nothing better than to celebrate saying goodbye in front of the home fans in your own country", said Huber. Huber's final match took place on 31 October 2001 against Justine Henin, which she lost 6–1, 6–2.

During her 12-year career, Huber reached 23 singles finals (winning 12 of them), 29 singles semifinals, and 50 singles quarterfinals. Her career record in singles was 447–225, and she earnedUS$4,768,292 in career prize money.

Huber represented her country at three levels: the Olympic Games in 1992 in Barcelona and in 1996 in Atlanta; the Fed Cup from 1990 through 1998 and in 2000 and 2001, helping Germany to victory in 1992 by beating Spain's Conchita Martínez in the final; and the Hopman Cup, which she won with Boris Becker in 1995.

Although she did not win a Grand Slam title, Huber felt proud of her accomplishments, especially because she had to walk in Graf's footsteps. "I recognised pretty early on that I would never have her success, but I was still always measured against her", she said. "So, whenever I got into the quarterfinals or the semis of a Grand Slam tournament, it counted for nothing. Sometimes it was good to have her because she drew the attention away from me...On the other side, there was always the pressure to be the second Steffi Graf."

In 2002, Huber accepted a role with the German Tennis Federation and became the co-tournament director for the annual Porsche Tennis Grand Prix WTA tournament in Filderstadt, Germany.

== Personal life ==
In April 2005, Huber gave birth to her first child, a boy, with her partner at the time, Roger Wittmann. A second, a girl, followed in October 2006.

== Major finals ==
=== Grand Slam finals ===
==== Singles: (1 runner–up) ====
Result	Year	Championship	Surface	Opponent	Score
Loss	1996	Australian Open	Hard	(United States) Monica Seles	4–6, 1–6

=== Year-End Championships finals ===
==== Singles: (1 runner–up) ====
Result	Year	Championship	Surface	Opponent	Score
Loss	1995	New York City	Carpet (I)	(Germany) Steffi Graf	1–6, 6–2, 1–6, 6–4, 3–6

== WTA Tour finals ==
=== Singles: 23 (12–11) ===
Winner – Legend Grand Slam tournaments (0–1) WTA Tour Championships (0–1) Tier I (1–1) Tier II (4–6) Tier III (4–1) Tier IV (2–0) Tier V (1–1)	Finals by surface Hard (2–6) Grass (1–0) Clay (4–1) Carpet (5–4)

Result	W/L	Date	Tournament	Tier	Surface	Opponent	Score
Win	1–0	Aug 1990	Schenectady, U.S.	Tier V	Hard	(United States) Marianne Werdel	6–1, 5–7, 6–4
Loss	1–1	Sep 1990	Bayonne, France	Tier V	Hard (i)	(France) Nathalie Tauziat	3–6, 6–7^{(8–10)}
Win	2–1	Oct 1991	Filderstadt, Germany	Tier II	Carpet (i)	(United States) Martina Navratilova	2–6, 6–2, 7–6^{(7–4)}
Loss	2–2	Jan 1993	Sydney, Australia	Tier II	Hard	(United States) Jennifer Capriati	1–6, 4–6
Win	3–2	Jul 1993	Kitzbühel, Austria	Tier III	Clay	(Austria) Judith Wiesner	6–4, 6–1
Loss	3–3	Oct 1993	Brighton, UK	Tier II	Carpet (i)	(Czech Republic) Jana Novotná	2–6, 4–6
Win	4–3	Jul 1994	Styria, Austria	Tier IV	Clay	(Austria) Judith Wiesner	6–3, 6–3
Win	5–3	Oct 1994	Filderstadt, Germany	Tier II	Hard (i)	(France) Mary Pierce	6–4, 6–2
Win	6–3	Nov 1994	Philadelphia, U.S.	Tier I	Carpet (i)	(France) Mary Pierce	6–0, 6–7^{(4–7)}, 7–5
Win	7–3	Sep 1995	Leipzig, Germany	Tier II	Carpet (i)	(Bulgaria) Magdalena Maleeva	w/o
Loss	7–4	Nov 1995	WTA Tour Championships, U.S.	Tour final	Carpet (i)	(Germany) Steffi Graf	1–6, 6–2, 1–6, 6–4, 3–6
Loss	7–5	Jan 1996	Australian Open	G. Slam	Hard	(United States) Monica Seles	4–6, 1–6
Win	8–5	Jun 1996	Rosmalen, Netherlands	Tier III	Grass	(Czech Republic) Helena Suková	6–4, 7–6^{(7–2)}
Loss	8–6	Aug 1996	Los Angeles, U.S.	Tier II	Hard	(United States) Lindsay Davenport	2–6, 3–6
Win	9–6	Sep 1996	Leipzig, Germany	Tier II	Carpet (i)	(Croatia) Iva Majoli	5–7, 6–3, 6–1
Loss	9–7	Oct 1996	Filderstadt, Germany	Tier II	Hard (i)	(Switzerland) Martina Hingis	2–6, 6–3, 3–6
Win	10–7	Oct 1996	Luxembourg	Tier III	Carpet (i)	(Slovakia) Karina Habšudová	6–3, 6–0
Loss	10–8	Feb 1997	Paris, France	Tier II	Carpet (i)	(Switzerland) Martina Hingis	3–6, 6–3, 3–6
Loss	10–9	Aug 1997	Toronto, Canada	Tier I	Hard	(United States) Monica Seles	2–6, 4–6
Win	11–9	Apr 2000	Estoril, Portugal	Tier IV	Clay	(France) Nathalie Dechy	6–2, 1–6, 7–5
Win	12–9	Jul 2000	Sopot, Poland	Tier III	Clay	(Spain) Gala León García	7–6^{(7–4)}, 6–3
Loss	12–10	Feb 2001	Paris, France	Tier II	Carpet (i)	(France) Amélie Mauresmo	6–7^{(2–7)}, 1–6
Loss	12–11	May 2001	Strasbourg, France	Tier III	Clay	(Italy) Silvia Farina Elia	5–7, 6–0, 4–6

=== Doubles: 4 (1–3) ===
Winner – Legend Grand Slam tournaments (0–0) WTA Tour Championships (0–0) Tier I (0–1) Tier II (1–2) Tier III (0–0) Tier IV (0–0) Tier V (0–0)	Finals by surface Hard (0–2) Grass (0–0) Clay (1–0) Carpet (0–1)

Result	W/L	Date	Tournament	Tier	Surface	Partner	Opponents	Score
Loss	0–1	Oct 1993	Brighton, UK	Tier II	Carpet (i)	(Latvia) Larisa Neiland	(Italy) Laura Golarsa (Ukraine) Natalia Medvedeva	3–6, 6–1, 4–6
Win	1–1	Apr 1997	Hamburg, Germany	Tier II	Clay	(France) Mary Pierce	(Romania) Ruxandra Dragomir (Croatia) Iva Majoli	2–6, 7–6^{(7–1)}, 6–2
Loss	1–2	Jan 1999	Sydney, Australia	Tier II	Hard	(United States) Mary Joe Fernández	(Russia) Elena Likhovtseva (Japan) Ai Sugiyama	3–6, 6–2, 0–6
Loss	1–3	Oct 1999	Moscow, Russia	Tier I	Carpet (i)	(France) Julie Halard-Decugis	(United States) Lisa Raymond (Australia) Rennae Stubbs	1–6, 0–6

== ITF finals ==
=== Singles (2–0) ===
Legend
$25,000 tournaments
$10,000 tournaments

Result	No.	Date	Tournament	Surface	Opponent	Score
Win	1.	29 May 1989	Katowice, Poland	Clay	(Czechoslovakia) Nora Bajčíková	6–1, 6–2
Win	2.	26 November 1989	Bulleen, Australia	Hard	(Australia) Rennae Stubbs	6–4, 6–1

== Grand Slam singles performance timeline ==
Key
W	F	SF	QF	#R	RR	Q#	DNQ	A	NH

(W) winner; (F) finalist; (SF) semifinalist; (QF) quarterfinalist; (#R) rounds 4, 3, 2, 1; (RR) round-robin stage; (Q#) qualification round; (DNQ) did not qualify; (A) absent; (NH) not held; (SR) strike rate (events won / competed); (W–L) win–loss record.

Tournament	1989	1990	1991	1992	1993	1994	1995	1996	1997	1998	1999	2000	2001	Career SR
Australian Open	A	3R	QF	QF	4R	3R	4R	F	4R	SF	2R	1R	A	0 / 11
French Open	A	A	3R	2R	SF	4R	4R	4R	1R	A	A	4R	2R	0 / 9
Wimbledon	A	2R	4R	3R	4R	2R	4R	3R	3R	A	1R	4R	4R	0 / 11
US Open	A	1R	2R	1R	3R	2R	4R	1R	3R	1R	QF	QF	3R	0 / 12
SR	0 / 0	0 / 3	0 / 4	0 / 4	0 / 4	0 / 4	0 / 4	0 / 4	0 / 4	0 / 2	0 / 3	0 / 4	0 / 3	0 / 43
Year-end ranking	203	37	14	11	10	12	10	7	14	21	16	19	18	

== Head-to-head record against other players in the top 10 ==
Players who have been ranked world No. 1 are in boldface.

- Martina Hingis 1–12
- Lindsay Davenport 2–10
- Dominique Monami 2–1
- Arantxa Sánchez Vicario 2–12
- Venus Williams 1–3
- Steffi Graf 0–10
- Kim Clijsters 1–2
- Justine Henin 0–3
- Amélie Mauresmo 2–3
- Nadia Petrova 1–0
- Monica Seles 0–9
- Martina Navratilova 2–1
- Conchita Martínez 6–2
- Jennifer Capriati 1–7
- Amanda Coetzer 4–3
- Anna Kournikova 3–3
- Mary Joe Fernández 3–4
- Kimiko Date 1–2
- Nathalie Tauziat 4–8
- Jana Novotná 4–8
- Irina Spîrlea 7–1
- Gabriela Sabatini 3–4
- Mary Pierce 5–6
- Helena Suková 2–0
- Manuela Maleeva-Fragniere 2–0
- Elena Dementieva 1–3
- Anastasia Myskina 1–0
- Barbara Schett 6–2
- Patty Schnyder 2-1
- Zina Garrison 2-1
- Lori McNeil 5-1
- Iva Majoli 5-4
- Katerina Maleeva 2-1
- Magdalena Maleeva 6-3
- Chanda Rubin 1-1
- Sandrine Testud 5-2
- Natasha Zvereva 6-1
- Helena Sukova 2-0
- Jo Durie 3-1
- Julie Halard-Decugis 4-3
- Brenda Schultz-McCarthy 5-2
- Pam Shriver 3-0
- Barbara Paulus 2-1

== See also ==
- Performance timelines for all female tennis players since 1978 who reached at least one Grand Slam final
