= Sparkassen Cup (tennis) =

Defunct tennis tournament
- Event name: Volkswagen Grand Prix (1990–1993); International Grand Prix (1994); Sparkassen Cup (1995–2003)
- Tour: WTA Tour
- Founded: 1990
- Abolished: 2003
- Editions: 14
- Surface: Carpet

The Sparkassen Cup is a defunct WTA Tour affiliated tennis tournament played from 1990 to 2003. It was held in Leipzig in Germany and played on indoor carpet courts.

The inaugural event was held from 24 to 30 September 1990, shortly before the German reunification.

Steffi Graf won the first four titles and won the tournament again in 1998 to make her the most successful player at the event. Anke Huber, Jana Novotná and Kim Clijsters also won multiple singles titles at the event.

== Past finals ==
=== Singles ===
Year	Champions	Runners-up	Score
1990	(West Germany) Steffi Graf	(Spain) Arantxa Sánchez Vicario	6–1, 6–1
1991	(Germany) Steffi Graf	(Czechoslovakia) Jana Novotná	6–3, 6–3
1992	(Germany) Steffi Graf	(Czechoslovakia) Jana Novotná	6–3, 1–6, 6–4
1993	(Germany) Steffi Graf	(Czech Republic) Jana Novotná	6–2, 6–0
1994	(Czech Republic) Jana Novotná	(France) Mary Pierce	7–5, 6–1
1995	(Germany) Anke Huber	(Bulgaria) Magdalena Maleeva	Walkover
1996	(Germany) Anke Huber	(Croatia) Iva Majoli	5–7, 6–3, 6–1
1997	(Czech Republic) Jana Novotná	(South Africa) Amanda Coetzer	6–2, 4–6, 6–3
1998	(Germany) Steffi Graf	(France) Nathalie Tauziat	6–3, 6–4
1999	(France) Nathalie Tauziat	(Czech Republic) Květa Hrdličková	6–1, 6–3
2000	(Belgium) Kim Clijsters	(Russia) Elena Likhovtseva	7–6^{(8–6)}, 4–6, 6–4
2001	(Belgium) Kim Clijsters	(Bulgaria) Magdalena Maleeva	6–1, 6–1
2002	(United States) Serena Williams	(Russia) Anastasia Myskina	6–3, 6–2
2003	(Russia) Anastasia Myskina	(Belgium) Justine Henin-Hardenne	3–6, 6–3, 6–3

=== Doubles ===
Year	Champions	Runners-up	Score
1990	(United States) Gretchen Magers (South Africa) Lise Gregory	(Netherlands) Manon Bollegraf (United Kingdom) Jo Durie	6–2, 4–6, 6–3
1991	(Netherlands) Manon Bollegraf (France) Isabelle Demongeot	(Canada) Jill Hetherington (United States) Kathy Rinaldi	6–4, 6–3
1992	(Latvia) Larisa Savtsjenko-Neiland (Czechoslovakia) Jana Novotná	(United States) Patty Fendick (Czechoslovakia) Andrea Strnadová	7–5, 7–6^{(7–4)}
1993	(Belarus) Natasha Zvereva (United States) Gigi Fernández	(Latvia) Larisa Neiland (Czech Republic) Jana Novotná	6–3, 6–2
1994	(United States) Patty Fendick (United States) Meredith McGrath	(Latvia) Larisa Neiland (Netherlands) Manon Bollegraf	6–4, 6–4
1995	(Latvia) Larisa Neiland (United States) Meredith McGrath	(Netherlands) Brenda Schultz-McCarthy (Netherlands) Caroline Vis	6–4, 6–4
1996	(Netherlands) Kristie Boogert (France) Nathalie Tauziat	(Netherlands) Miriam Oremans (Belgium) Sabine Appelmans	6–4, 6–4
1997	(Switzerland) Martina Hingis (Czech Republic) Jana Novotná	(Indonesia) Yayuk Basuki (Czech Republic) Helena Suková	6–2, 6–2
1998	(Japan) Ai Sugiyama (Russia) Elena Likhovtseva	(Netherlands) Manon Bollegraf (Romania) Irina Spîrlea	6–3, 6–7^{(2–7)}, 6–1
1999	(Latvia) Larisa Neiland (France) Mary Pierce	(Japan) Ai Sugiyama (Russia) Elena Likhovtseva	6–4, 6–3
2000	(France) Anne-Gaëlle Sidot (Spain) Arantxa Sánchez-Vicario	(Belgium) Kim Clijsters (Belgium) Laurence Courtois	6–7^{(6–8)}, 7–5, 6–3
2001	(France) Nathalie Tauziat (Russia) Elena Likhovtseva	(Czech Republic) Květa Hrdličková (Germany) Barbara Rittner	6–4, 6–2
2002	(United States) Serena Williams (United States) Alexandra Stevenson	(Slovakia) Janette Husárová (Argentina) Paola Suárez	6–3, 7–5
2003	(United States) Martina Navratilova (Russia) Svetlana Kuznetsova	(Russia) Elena Likhovtseva (Russia) Nadia Petrova	3–6, 6–1, 6–3
