= 1992 Volkswagen Cup Damen Grand Prix – Singles =

Singles
- 1992 Volkswagen Cup Damen Grand Prix

Final
- Champion: (Germany) Steffi Graf
- Runner-up: (Czechoslovakia) Jana Novotná
- Score: 6–3, 1–6, 6–4

Details
- Draw: 32 (1WC)
- Seeds: 8

Events
Singles	Doubles
← 1991 ·	Sparkassen Cup	· 1993 →

Steffi Graf won her third consecutive title by defeating Jana Novotná 6–3, 1–6, 6–4 in the final.

== Seeds ==
1. (Germany) Steffi Graf (champion)
2. (Spain) Conchita Martínez (quarterfinals)
3. (Germany) Anke Huber (quarterfinals)
4. (Czechoslovakia) Jana Novotná (final)
5. (Czechoslovakia) Helena Suková (semifinals)
6. (United States) Zina Garrison (second round)
7. (Bulgaria) Katerina Maleeva (semifinals)
8. (Belgium) Sabine Appelmans (quarterfinals)

== Draw ==
=== Key ===
- Q = Qualifier
- WC = Wild card
- LL = Lucky loser
- Alt = Alternate
- ITF = ITF entry
- PR = Protected ranking
- SR = Special ranking
- SE = Special exempt
- JE = Junior exempt
- JR = Junior Accelerator Programme entrant
- CO = College Accelerator Programme entrant
- NG = Next Gen Accelerator Program entrant
- w/o = Walkover
- r = Retired
- d = Defaulted

=== Finals ===
Semifinals
1	(Germany) Steffi Graf	6	6
7	(Bulgaria) Katerina Maleeva	1	1
4	(Czechoslovakia) Jana Novotná	6	6
5	(Czechoslovakia) Helena Suková	3	2

Final
1	(Germany) Steffi Graf	6	1	6
4	(Czechoslovakia) Jana Novotná	3	6	4

=== Top half ===
First round
1	(Germany) S Graf	6	6
WC	(Germany) P Begerow	1	0
(Germany) M Kochta	3	6^{2}
(Latvia) L Savchenko-Neiland	6	7^{7}
(Bulgaria) M Maleeva	6	6
(Argentina) M Paz	0	4
(United Kingdom) J Durie	7	1	1
6	(United States) Z Garrison	5	6	6
3	(Germany) A Huber	7^{7}	6
(Germany) B Rittner	6^{3}	0
(Germany) C Porwik	3	6	6
(Czechoslovakia) P Holubová	6	0	2
(Commonwealth of Independent States) E Maniokova	0	0
(Austria) J Wiesner	6	6
(Commonwealth of Independent States) N Medvedeva	3	7^{8}	5
7	(Bulgaria) K Maleeva	6	6^{6}	7

Second round
1	(Germany) S Graf	6	6
(Latvia) L Savchenko-Neiland	3	3
(Bulgaria) M Maleeva	6	6
6	(United States) Z Garrison	4	4
3	(Germany) A Huber	6	6
(Germany) C Porwik	2	3
(Austria) J Wiesner	0	4
7	(Bulgaria) K Maleeva	6	6

Quarterfinals
1	(Germany) S Graf	6	6
(Bulgaria) M Maleeva	2	2
3	(Germany) A Huber	6	6^{4}	1
7	(Bulgaria) K Maleeva	1	7^{7}	6

Semifinals
1	(Germany) S Graf	6	6
7	(Bulgaria) K Maleeva	1	1

=== Bottom half ===
First round
8	(Belgium) S Appelmans	6	4	6
(Netherlands) N Muns-Jagerman	4	6	0
(United States) L Harvey Wild	2	3
(United States) J Santrock	6	6
(United States) K Adams	3	2
(Czechoslovakia) R Zrubáková	6	6
(Czechoslovakia) A Strnadová	2	4
4	(Czechoslovakia) J Novotná	6	6
5	(Czechoslovakia) H Suková	6	6
(Germany) M Babel	3	1
(Germany) S Meier	0	6	6
(Finland) P Thorén	6	3	4
(Germany) W Probst	7	6^{5}	4
(France) A Dechaume	5	7^{7}	6
(France) I Demongeot	2	4
2	(Spain) C Martínez	6	6

Second round
8	(Belgium) S Appelmans	6	6
(United States) J Santrock	2	3
(Czechoslovakia) R Zrubáková	1	3
4	(Czechoslovakia) J Novotná	6	6
5	(Czechoslovakia) H Suková	6	6
(Germany) S Meier	3	3
(France) A Dechaume	4	6	2
2	(Spain) C Martínez	6	3	6

Quarterfinals
8	(Belgium) S Appelmans	6	1	0
4	(Czechoslovakia) J Novotná	3	6	6
5	(Czechoslovakia) H Suková	3	6	6
2	(Spain) C Martínez	6	2	2

Semifinals
4	(Czechoslovakia) J Novotná	6	6
5	(Czechoslovakia) H Suková	3	2
