= 1992 Volkswagen Cup Damen Grand Prix – Doubles =

Doubles
- 1992 Volkswagen Cup Damen Grand Prix

Final
- Champions: (Czechoslovakia) Jana Novotná (Latvia) Larisa Savchenko-Neiland
- Runners-up: (United States) Patty Fendick (Czechoslovakia) Andrea Strnadová
- Score: 7–5, 7–6^{(7–4)}

Details
- Draw: 16 (1Q)
- Seeds: 4

Events
Singles	Doubles
← 1991 ·	Sparkassen Cup	· 1993 →

Manon Bollegraf and Isabelle Demongeot were the defending champions, but Bollegraf did not compete this year. Demongeot teamed up with Alexia Dechaume and lost in the first round to Nicole Muns-Jagerman and Wiltrud Probst.

Jana Novotná and Larisa Savchenko-Neiland won the title by defeating Patty Fendick and Andrea Strnadová 7–5, 7–6^{(7–4)} in the final.

== Seeds ==
1. (Czechoslovakia) Jana Novotná / (Latvia) Larisa Savchenko-Neiland (champions)
2. (United States) Katrina Adams / (United States) Zina Garrison (quarterfinals)
3. (United States) Patty Fendick / (Czechoslovakia) Andrea Strnadová (final)
4. (France) Alexia Dechaume / (France) Isabelle Demongeot (first round)

== Draw ==
=== Key ===
- Q = Qualifier
- WC = Wild card
- LL = Lucky loser
- Alt = Alternate
- ITF = ITF entry
- PR = Protected ranking
- SR = Special ranking
- SE = Special exempt
- JE = Junior exempt
- JR = Junior Accelerator Programme entrant
- CO = College Accelerator Programme entrant
- NG = Next Gen Accelerator Program entrant
- w/o = Walkover
- r = Retired
- d = Defaulted

=== Draw ===
First round
1	(Czechoslovakia) J Novotná (Latvia) L Savchenko-Neiland	6	6
(United Kingdom) J Durie (Argentina) M Paz	3	3
(Bulgaria) K Maleeva (Bulgaria) M Maleeva	5	1
(Commonwealth of Independent States) N Medvedeva (Czechoslovakia) R Zrubáková	7	6
4	(France) A Dechaume (France) I Demongeot	3	6	5
(Netherlands) N Muns-Jagerman (Germany) W Probst	6	3	7
(Germany) M Babel (Germany) E Pfaff	4	2
(United States) L Harvey Wild (Austria) J Wiesner	6	6
(Germany) R Kochta (Germany) V Martinek	5	0
(Commonwealth of Independent States) E Maniokova (Commonwealth of Independent States) V Milvidskaia	7	6
Q	(Czechoslovakia) P Holubová (Germany) S Meier	6	4	3
3	(United States) P Fendick (Czechoslovakia) A Strnadová	3	6	6
(Belgium) S Appelmans (Germany) C Porwik	7^{8}	6
(Germany) S Graf (Germany) B Rittner	6^{6}	3
(United States) J Santrock (Finland) P Thorén	5	1
2	(United States) K Adams (United States) Z Garrison	7	6

Quarterfinals
1	(Czechoslovakia) J Novotná (Latvia) L Savchenko-Neiland	3	6	6
(Commonwealth of Independent States) N Medvedeva (Czechoslovakia) R Zrubáková	6	3	4
(Netherlands) N Muns-Jagerman (Germany) W Probst	4	4
(United States) L Harvey Wild (Austria) J Wiesner	6	6
(Commonwealth of Independent States) E Maniokova (Commonwealth of Independent States) V Milvidskaia	3	6^{3}
3	(United States) P Fendick (Czechoslovakia) A Strnadová	6	7^{7}
(Belgium) S Appelmans (Germany) C Porwik	6	6
2	(United States) K Adams (United States) Z Garrison	4	3

Semifinals
1	(Czechoslovakia) J Novotná (Latvia) L Savchenko-Neiland	6	6
(United States) L Harvey Wild (Austria) J Wiesner	1	3
3	(United States) P Fendick (Czechoslovakia) A Strnadová	7	2	7^{7}
(Belgium) S Appelmans (Germany) C Porwik	5	6	6^{2}

Final
1	(Czechoslovakia) J Novotná (Latvia) L Savchenko-Neiland	7	7^{7}
3	(United States) P Fendick (Czechoslovakia) A Strnadová	5	6^{4}
