= 1991 Volkswagen Cup – Singles =

Singles
- 1991 Volkswagen Cup

Final
- Champion: (Germany) Steffi Graf
- Runner-up: (Czechoslovakia) Jana Novotná
- Score: 6–3, 6–3

Details
- Draw: 28 (4Q)
- Seeds: 8

Events
Singles	Doubles
← 1990 ·	Sparkassen Cup	· 1992 →

Steffi Graf successfully defended her title by defeating Jana Novotná 6–3, 6–3 in the final.

== Seeds ==
The first four seeds received a bye into the second round.

1. (Germany) Steffi Graf (champion)
2. (Spain) Arantxa Sánchez Vicario (semifinals)
3. (Czechoslovakia) Jana Novotná (final)
4. (Bulgaria) Katerina Maleeva (quarterfinals)
5. (Soviet Union) Leila Meskhi (second round)
6. (Austria) Judith Wiesner (quarterfinals)
7. (Germany) Anke Huber (quarterfinals)
8. (Austria) Barbara Paulus (semifinals)

== Draw ==
=== Key ===
- Q = Qualifier
- WC = Wild card
- LL = Lucky loser
- Alt = Alternate
- SE = Special exempt
- PR = Protected ranking
- ITF = ITF entry
- JE = Junior exempt
- w/o = Walkover
- r = Retired
- d = Defaulted
- SR = Special ranking

=== Finals ===
Semifinals
1	(Germany) Steffi Graf	6	6
8	(Austria) Barbara Paulus	1	1
3	(Czechoslovakia) Jana Novotná	6	6
2	(Spain) Arantxa Sánchez Vicario	3	2

Final
1	(Germany) Steffi Graf	6	6
3	(Czechoslovakia) Jana Novotná	3	3

=== Top half ===
First round
Q	(Netherlands) K Boogert	2	4
(Czechoslovakia) P Langrová	6	6
Q	(Germany) C Porwik	6	6
(Luxembourg) K Kschwendt	3	1
(Soviet Union) E Brioukhovets	6^{6}	3
6	(Austria) J Wiesner	7^{8}	6
(Czechoslovakia) A Strnadová	4	6	2
(Czechoslovakia) E Švíglerová	6	4	6
(United States) L Harvey Wild	3	7^{8}	4
(Czechoslovakia) R Zrubáková	6	6^{6}	6
(Czechoslovakia) R Rajchrtová	1	7^{7}	2
8	(Austria) B Paulus	6	6^{3}	6

Second round
1	(Germany) S Graf	6	6
(Czechoslovakia) P Langrová	0	1
Q	(Germany) C Porwik	2	5
6	(Austria) J Wiesner	6	7
4	(Bulgaria) K Maleeva	6	6
(Czechoslovakia) E Švíglerová	4	3
(Czechoslovakia) R Zrubáková	6^{4}	1
8	(Austria) B Paulus	7^{7}	6

Quarterfinals
1	(Germany) S Graf	6	7^{7}
6	(Austria) J Wiesner	1	6^{1}
4	(Bulgaria) K Maleeva	6^{4}	6	6^{5}
8	(Austria) B Paulus	7^{7}	0	7^{7}

Semifinals
1	(Germany) S Graf	6	6
8	(Austria) B Paulus	1	1

=== Bottom half ===
First round
7	(Germany) A Huber	6	6
Q	(Poland) K Nowak	2	1
(France) I Demongeot	7^{7}	6
(Argentina) M Paz	6^{5}	4
(Socialist Federal Republic of Yugoslavia) N Ercegović	7^{7}	6
(Germany) W Probst	6^{1}	2
5	(Soviet Union) L Meskhi	6	6
(Netherlands) M Bollegraf	3	4
(United States) K Rinaldi	4	1
(Germany) B Rittner	6	6
(Germany) M Kochta	6	6
Q	(Soviet Union) V Milvidskaia	4	4

Second round
7	(Germany) A Huber	7^{7}	6
(France) I Demongeot	6^{2}	3
(Socialist Federal Republic of Yugoslavia) N Ercegović	4	4
3	(Czechoslovakia) J Novotná	6	6
5	(Soviet Union) L Meskhi	2	3
(Germany) B Rittner	6	6
(Germany) M Kochta	6^{7}	1
2	(Spain) A Sánchez Vicario	7^{9}	6

Quarterfinals
7	(Germany) A Huber	6	3	4
3	(Czechoslovakia) J Novotná	3	6	6
(Germany) B Rittner	1	1
2	(Spain) A Sánchez Vicario	6	6

Semifinals
3	(Czechoslovakia) J Novotná	6	6
2	(Spain) A Sánchez Vicario	3	2
