= 1993 Volkswagen Card Cup – Doubles =

Doubles
- 1993 Volkswagen Card Cup

Final
- Champions: (United States) Gigi Fernández (Belarus) Natasha Zvereva
- Runners-up: (Latvia) Larisa Neiland (Czech Republic) Jana Novotná
- Score: 6–3, 6–2

Details
- Draw: 16 (1Q)
- Seeds: 4

Events
Singles	Doubles
← 1992 ·	Sparkassen Cup	· 1994 →

Larisa Neiland and Jana Novotná were the defending champions, but lost in the final to Gigi Fernández and Natasha Zvereva. The score was 6–3, 6–2.

== Seeds ==
1. (United States) Gigi Fernández / (Belarus) Natasha Zvereva (champions)
2. (Latvia) Larisa Neiland / (Czech Republic) Jana Novotná (final)
3. (Italy) Sandra Cecchini / (Argentina) Patricia Tarabini (first round)
4. (United States) Patty Fendick / (United States) Meredith McGrath (semifinals)

== Draw ==
Key

- Q = Qualifier
- WC = Wild card
- LL = Lucky loser
- Alt = Alternate
- ITF = ITF entry
- PR = Protected ranking
- SR = Special ranking
- SE = Special exempt
- JE = Junior exempt
- JR = Junior Accelerator Programme entrant
- CO = College Accelerator Programme entrant
- NG = Next Gen Accelerator Program entrant
- w/o = Walkover
- r = Retired
- d = Defaulted

=== Draw ===
First round
1	(United States) G Fernández (Belarus) N Zvereva	6	6
(Germany) W Probst (Germany) C Singer	0	1
(Netherlands) M Oremans (Netherlands) C Vis	6	6
(Netherlands) K Boogert (Netherlands) N Muns-Jagerman	3	2
4	(United States) P Fendick (United States) M McGrath	6	4	6
(United States) K Po (Czech Republic) A Strnadová	2	6	3
(Belgium) S Appelmans (Germany) C Porwik	6	6
(Canada) M Drake (Belgium) N Feber	1	1
(Germany) A Huber (Germany) B Rittner	6	1	6
(Austria) J Wiesner (Slovakia) R Zrubáková	4	6	0
(Germany) M Babel (Italy) L Golarsa	7^{7}	6
3	(Italy) S Cecchini (Argentina) P Tarabini	6^{2}	2
(Socialist Federal Republic of Yugoslavia) N Ercegović (Germany) S Meier	6	4	5
(Germany) R Kochta (Germany) C Schneider	3	6	7
Q	(Germany) S Lohmann (Austria) B Reinstadler	6^{3}	1
2	(Latvia) L Neiland (Czech Republic) J Novotná	7^{7}	6

Quarterfinals
1	(United States) G Fernández (Belarus) N Zvereva	6	6
(Netherlands) M Oremans (Netherlands) C Vis	4	2
4	(United States) P Fendick (United States) M McGrath	6	6
(Belgium) S Appelmans (Germany) C Porwik	4	2
(Germany) A Huber (Germany) B Rittner	6	6
(Germany) M Babel (Italy) L Golarsa	2	2
(Germany) R Kochta (Germany) C Schneider	2	0
2	(Latvia) L Neiland (Czech Republic) J Novotná	6	6

Semifinals
1	(United States) G Fernández (Belarus) N Zvereva	6	7^{7}
4	(United States) P Fendick (United States) M McGrath	2	6^{5}
(Germany) A Huber (Germany) B Rittner	6	6^{6}	3
2	(Latvia) L Neiland (Czech Republic) J Novotná	3	7^{8}	6

Final
1	(United States) G Fernández (Belarus) N Zvereva	6	6
2	(Latvia) L Neiland (Czech Republic) J Novotná	3	2
