= 1990 Volkswagen Damen Grand Prix – Singles =

Singles
- 1990 Volkswagen Damen Grand Prix

Final
- Champion: (West Germany) Steffi Graf
- Runner-up: (Spain) Arantxa Sánchez Vicario
- Score: 6–1, 6–1

Details
- Draw: 28 (2WC/4Q)
- Seeds: 8

Events
Singles	Doubles
Sparkassen Cup	· 1991 →

In the inaugural edition of the tournament, Steffi Graf won the title by defeating Arantxa Sánchez Vicario 6–1, 6–1 in the final.

== Seeds ==
The top four seeds received a bye to the second round.

1. (West Germany) Steffi Graf (champion)
2. (Spain) Arantxa Sánchez Vicario (final)
3. (Spain) Conchita Martínez (semifinals)
4. (Austria) Judith Wiesner (quarterfinals)
5. (Austria) Barbara Paulus (semifinals)
6. (United States) Gretchen Magers (first round)
7. (Netherlands) Manon Bollegraf (quarterfinals)
8. (France) Julie Halard (first round)

== Draw ==
=== Key ===
- Q = Qualifier
- WC = Wild card
- LL = Lucky loser
- Alt = Alternate
- SE = Special exempt
- PR = Protected ranking
- ITF = ITF entry
- JE = Junior exempt
- w/o = Walkover
- r = Retired
- d = Defaulted
- SR = Special ranking

=== Finals ===
Semifinals
1	(West Germany) Steffi Graf	7^{7}	7^{7}
3	(Spain) Conchita Martínez	6^{3}	6^{4}
5	(Austria) Barbara Paulus	0	5
2	(Spain) Arantxa Sánchez Vicario	6	7

Final
1	(West Germany) Steffi Graf	6	6
2	(Spain) Arantxa Sánchez Vicario	1	1

=== Top half ===
First round
Q	(South Africa) L Gregory	4	4
(Italy) L Golarsa	6	6
WC	(West Germany) M Kochta	6	5	0
(United States) K Rinaldi	1	7	6
Q	(Belgium) A Devries	7	3	2
7	(Netherlands) M Bollegraf	5	6	6
Q	(West Germany) S Menning	4	0
(Sweden) C Lindqvist	6	6
(West Germany) C Kohde-Kilsch	6	6
(France) K Quentrec	2	2
WC	(West Germany) B Rittner	3	7^{7}	7
6	(United States) G Magers	6	6^{0}	5

Second round
1	(West Germany) S Graf	6	6
(Italy) L Golarsa	3	2
(United States) K Rinaldi	4	0
7	(Netherlands) M Bollegraf	6	6
3	(Spain) C Martínez	6	6
(Sweden) C Lindqvist	3	3
(West Germany) C Kohde-Kilsch	6	6
WC	(West Germany) B Rittner	1	0

Quarterfinals
1	(West Germany) S Graf	6	6
7	(Netherlands) M Bollegraf	1	2
3	(Spain) C Martínez	6	2	6
(West Germany) C Kohde-Kilsch	3	6	1

Semifinals
1	(West Germany) S Graf	7^{7}	7^{7}
3	(Spain) C Martínez	6^{3}	6^{4}

=== Bottom half ===
First round
5	(Austria) B Paulus	6	6
Q	(United Kingdom) J Salmon	4	4
(France) N Herreman	2	5
(Australia) A Minter	6	7
(West Germany) W Probst	6	4	6^{2}
(Czechoslovakia) D Krajčovičová	4	6	7^{7}
8	(France) J Halard	1	6^{2}
(Czechoslovakia) A Strnadová	6	7^{7}
(Czechoslovakia) R Rajchrtová	6	4	4
(Czechoslovakia) R Zrubáková	4	6	6
(United Kingdom) J Durie	6	6^{2}	3
(Argentina) M Paz	4	7^{7}	6

Second round
5	(Austria) B Paulus	6	6
(Australia) A Minter	1	0
(Czechoslovakia) D Krajčovičová	1	1
4	(Austria) J Wiesner	6	6
(Czechoslovakia) A Strnadová	6	6
(Czechoslovakia) R Zrubáková	2	4
(Argentina) M Paz	6^{2}	3
2	(Spain) A Sánchez Vicario	7^{7}	6

Quarterfinals
5	(Austria) B Paulus	6	5	6
4	(Austria) J Wiesner	3	7	4
(Czechoslovakia) A Strnadová	7^{7}	2	1
2	(Spain) A Sánchez Vicario	6^{5}	6	6

Semifinals
5	(Austria) B Paulus	0	5
2	(Spain) A Sánchez Vicario	6	7
