= 1991 Volkswagen Cup =

- Date: 30 September – 6 October
- Edition: 2nd
- Category: Tier III
- Draw: 28S / 16D
- Prize money: $225,000
- Surface: Carpet / indoor
- Location: Leipzig, Germany
- Venue: Fairhall

Champions

Singles
- (Germany) Steffi Graf

Doubles
- (Netherlands) Manon Bollegraf (France) Isabelle Demongeot
← 1990 ·	WTA Leipzig	· 1992 →

The 1991 Volkswagen Cup was a women's tennis tournament played on indoor carpet courts at the Fairhall in Leipzig in Germany that was part of Tier III of the 1991 WTA Tour. It was the second edition of the tournament and was held from 30 September until 6 October 1991. First-seeded Steffi Graf won the singles title, her second consecutive at the event, and earned $45,000 first-prize money as well as 240 ranking points.

== Finals ==
=== Singles ===
(Germany) Steffi Graf defeated (Czechoslovakia) Jana Novotná 6–3, 6–3

- It was Graf's 5th singles title of the year and the 59th of her career.

=== Doubles ===
(Netherlands) Manon Bollegraf / (France) Isabelle Demongeot defeated (Canada) Jill Hetherington / (United States) Kathy Rinaldi 6–4, 6–3

- It was Bollegraf's 1st doubles title of the year and the 8th of her career. It was Demongeot's 2nd doubles title of the year and the 6th of her career.
