= 1990 Volkswagen Damen Grand Prix =

- Date: 24–30 September
- Edition: 1st
- Category: Tier III
- Draw: 28S / 16D
- Prize money: $225,000
- Surface: Carpet / indoor
- Location: Leipzig, East Germany

Champions

Singles
- (West Germany) Steffi Graf

Doubles
- (South Africa) Lise Gregory / (United States) Gretchen Magers
| WTA Leipzig | · 1991 → |

The 1990 Volkswagen Damen Grand Prix was a women's tennis tournament played on indoor carpet courts in Leipzig in East Germany that was part of the Tier III category of the 1990 WTA Tour. It was the inaugural edition of the tournament and was held from 24 September until 30 September 1990. First-seeded Steffi Graf won the singles title and earned $45,000 first-prize money as well as 240 ranking points.

== Finals ==
=== Singles ===
(West Germany) Steffi Graf defeated (Spain) Arantxa Sánchez Vicario 6–1, 6–1

- It was Graf's 7th singles title of the year and the 51st of her career.

=== Doubles ===
(South Africa) Lise Gregory / (United States) Gretchen Magers defeated (Netherlands) Manon Bollegraf / (United Kingdom) Jo Durie 6–2, 4–6, 6–3

- It was Gregory's 2nd doubles title of the year and the 5th of her career. It was Magers' 2nd doubles title of the year and of her career.
