= 1993 Volkswagen Card Cup – Singles =

Singles
- 1993 Volkswagen Card Cup

Final
- Champion: (Germany) Steffi Graf
- Runner-up: (Czech Republic) Jana Novotná
- Score: 6–2, 6–0

Details
- Draw: 32 (2WC)
- Seeds: 8

Events
| Singles | Doubles |
- Sparkassen Cup

First-seeded Steffi Graf won her fourth consecutive singles title by defeating Jana Novotná 6–2, 6–0 in the final.

== Seeds ==
1. (Germany) Steffi Graf (champion)
2. (Spain) Conchita Martínez (semifinals)
3. (Czechoslovakia) Jana Novotná (final)
4. (Germany) Anke Huber (first round)
5. (Bulgaria) Magdalena Maleeva (quarterfinals)
6. (Austria) Judith Wiesner (semifinals)
7. (Belarus) Natasha Zvereva (quarterfinals)
8. (United States) Patty Fendick (quarterfinals)

== Draw ==
Key

- Q = Qualifier
- WC = Wild card
- LL = Lucky loser
- Alt = Alternate
- ITF = ITF entry
- PR = Protected ranking
- SR = Special ranking
- SE = Special exempt
- JE = Junior exempt
- JR = Junior Accelerator Programme entrant
- CO = College Accelerator Programme entrant
- NG = Next Gen Accelerator Program entrant
- w/o = Walkover
- r = Retired
- d = Defaulted

=== Finals ===
Semifinals
1 | (Germany) Steffi Graf | 6^{4} | 6 | 6
6 | (Austria) Judith Wiesner | 7^{7} | 2 | 3
3 | (Czech Republic) Jana Novotná | 6 | 6
2 | (Spain) Conchita Martínez | 1 | 1

Final
1 | (Germany) Steffi Graf | 6 | 6
3 | (Czech Republic) Jana Novotná | 2 | 0

=== Top half ===
First round
1 | (Germany) S Graf | 6 | 6
WC | (Germany) S Schmidle | 1 | 0
(Slovakia) R Zrubáková | 2 | 4
(Netherlands) N Muns-Jagerman | 6 | 6
(United States) M McGrath | 6 | 6
(Germany) C Porwik | 2 | 2
(Croatia) N Ercegović | 2 | 3
7 | (Belarus) N Zvereva | 6 | 6
4 | (Germany) A Huber | 6^{6} | 2
(Netherlands) S Rottier | 7^{8} | 6
(Germany) B Rittner | 7^{7} | 6
(Italy) L Golarsa | 6^{3} | 3
(Czech Republic) A Strnadová | 6 | 6
(Canada) M Drake | 4 | 1
(Netherlands) K Boogert | 6 | 5 | 5
6 | (Austria) J Wiesner | 3 | 7 | 7

Second round
1 | (Germany) S Graf | 6 | 6
(Netherlands) N Muns-Jagerman | 1 | 1
(United States) M McGrath | 6 | 1 | 6^{2}
7 | (Belarus) N Zvereva | 2 | 6 | 7^{7}
(Netherlands) S Rottier | 2 | 3
(Germany) B Rittner | 6 | 6
(Czech Republic) A Strnadová | 6 | 5 | 4
6 | (Austria) J Wiesner | 2 | 7 | 6

Quarterfinals
1 | (Germany) S Graf | 6 | 6
7 | (Belarus) N Zvereva | 2 | 1
(Germany) B Rittner | 7^{11} | 5 | 2
6 | (Austria) J Wiesner | 6^{9} | 7 | 6

Semifinals
1 | (Germany) S Graf | 6^{4} | 6 | 6
6 | (Austria) J Wiesner | 7^{7} | 2 | 3

=== Bottom half ===
First round
5 | (Bulgaria) M Maleeva | 3 | 6 | 6
(Germany) M Babel | 6 | 0 | 3
(United States) K Po | 6 | 7^{8}
(United States) G Fernández | 1 | 6^{6}
WC | (Germany) C Singer | 6 | 7^{7}
(Belgium) S Appelmans | 4 | 6^{3}
(Netherlands) M Oremans | 7^{7} | 1 | 1
3 | (Czech Republic) J Novotná | 6^{5} | 6 | 6
8 | (United States) P Fendick | 6 | 7^{7}
(Germany) S Meier | 3 | 6^{5}
(Germany) W Probst | 6 | 7
(Belgium) N Feber | 2 | 5
(Germany) M Kochta | 6 | 3 | 7^{7}
(Austria) B Reinstadler | 2 | 6 | 6^{0}
(Latvia) L Neiland | 6^{8} | 6^{3}
2 | (Spain) C Martínez | 7^{10} | 7^{7}

Second round
5 | (Bulgaria) M Maleeva | 6 | 6
(United States) K Po | 4 | 2
WC | (Germany) C Singer | 2 | 4
3 | (Czech Republic) J Novotná | 6 | 6
8 | (United States) P Fendick | 7^{7} | 6
(Germany) W Probst | 6^{4} | 3
(Germany) M Kochta | 6 | 4 | 2
2 | (Spain) C Martínez | 3 | 6 | 6

Quarterfinals
5 | (Bulgaria) M Maleeva | 3 | 2
3 | (Czech Republic) J Novotná | 6 | 6
8 | (United States) P Fendick | 1 | 1
2 | (Spain) C Martínez | 6 | 6

Semifinals
3 | (Czech Republic) J Novotná | 6 | 6
2 | (Spain) C Martínez | 1 | 1
