= Peter Graf =

German tennis coach (1938–2013)

- Born: 18 June 1938 Mannheim, Germany
- Died: 30 November 2013 (aged 75) Mannheim, Germany

Coaching career (1973–1986)
- Steffi Graf

Peter Graf (18 June 1938 – 30 November 2013) was a German tennis coach. He was the father and manager of the women's former world No. 1 tennis player Steffi Graf.

== Early life ==
Graf was born in Mannheim on 18 June 1938, as the only child of Alfons and Rosemarie Graf in a strict Catholic household. After the Second World War, he attended the Karl-Friedrich-Gymnasium Mannheim. Following his mother's death in 1956, his relationship with his father was strained, and the two did not speak for years. Graf played football for FC Friedrichsfeld.

== Tennis career ==
An insurance salesman and car dealer, Graf only discovered tennis at the age of 27. Within a few years, he had become a regional league player, acquired a coaching license, and owned a tennis hall. In 1968, he married Heidi Graf, with whom he had two children, Stefanie, born in 1969, and Michael, born in 1971.

An aspiring tennis coach, Graf introduced the game to his children, teaching his three-year-old daughter how to swing a wooden racket in both the tennis hall that he owned and the family's living room. In the mid-1970s, he was recruited as a player-coach of the first men's team of TC Bensheim, where he played alongside the lawyer and notary Siegfried Heinz, with his daughter eventually joining the club in 1977, aged 8. According to Heidrun Herth, who was her doubles partner on the Bensheim team in 1977, "Graf trained her very hard for her age. Steffi practically swept her Bensheim teammates, who were all a year older and physically superior". Convinced of her exceptional talent, Graf gave up his previous jobs two years later and devoted himself exclusively to his daughter's sporting success as a coach. During that fall, Steffi became the undisputed district champion in her age group in Viernheim, but the Grafs left TC Blau-Weiß shortly after, given that the club no longer required his coaching services.

The press soon dubbed his daughter a "child prodigy", which strengthened Graf's convictions, so he registered her as a player on the WTA professional tour in 1982, aged only 13. He closely controlled Steffi's schedule, limiting her play so that she would not burn out, and also kept a tight rein on her personal life, often declining social invitations on the tour so that she would stay focused on practicing, thus making few friends on tour. Former Czechoslovak tennis pro Pavel Složil was appointed as Steffi's coach, but fundamental decisions regarding her sporting career and marketing continued to be made by Graf.

== Controversies ==
=== Nicole Meissner ===
In the spring of 1990, the largest-circulation German tabloid, Bild, claimed under the headline "Sex, Baby, Nude Model" that Graf was having an affair with the former nude model Nicole Meissner (30 years younger than him), and reported on an alleged secret paternity.

At Wimbledon that year, Steffi broke down in tears during a press conference in which she was questioned about the scandal, so the Wimbledon authorities threatened to immediately shut down any subsequent press conferences in which this issue was raised.

Tests eventually proved that he was not the father, but the scandal certainly affected Steffi, who had never been comfortable in the spotlight, even in the best of times, so this contant press coverage "made her life more difficult", thus having a much quieter season on the tour after two record-breaking years. In fact, Steffi stated in an interview with Stern magazine in July 1990, that "I could not fight as usual".

Meissner was later sentenced to three years in prison for blackmailing Graf, who had previously paid 800,000 marks to prevent the rumors from being published in the media.

=== Conviction for tax evasion ===
In May 1995, Peter and his daughter Steffi were accused by German authorities of tax evasion in the early years of her career. In her defense, she stated that her father had been in control of all her financial affairs during that period, with Peter himself admitted that his daughter had known nothing of her own tax matters at that time. Therefore, on 2 August 1995, he was taken into custody "on suspicion of tax evasion" and because there was a risk of escape and obfuscation of justice. He thus lost his position as manager and sports advisor to his daughter, who had to reorganize her financial affairs, emphasizing in several interviews that she would now take care of her financial and sporting affairs herself.

The subsequent investigation and house searches resulted in Peter and a financial adviser, Joachim Eckhardt, both being convicted of tax evasion amounting to 12.3 million marks. This sum makes him the second-biggest prominent tax evader in Germany, only behind former Bayern Munich president Uli Hoeneß. He was sentenced to 45 months in jail, but he was eventually released early in early April 1998, after serving half of his sentence (25 months), including the time in pre-trial detention.

== Later life and death ==
Peter and his wife Heidi separated in 1998, and divorced in 1999, thus ending a marriage of 31 years. He then began dating the optician Britta, 20 years his junior, also divorced and also from Mannheim, whom he had known since childhood. In August 1999, they married in a discreet ceremony in Brühl, which was only attended by six close family members.

Peter Graf died of cancer in the Lindenhof district of Mannheim on 30 November 2013, at the age of 75.
