= 1990 Volkswagen Damen Grand Prix – Doubles =

Doubles
- 1990 Volkswagen Damen Grand Prix

Final
- Champions: (South Africa) Lise Gregory (United States) Gretchen Magers
- Runners-up: (Netherlands) Manon Bollegraf (United Kingdom) Jo Durie
- Score: 6–2, 4–6, 6–3

Details
- Draw: 16
- Seeds: 4

Events
| Singles | Doubles |
| Sparkassen Cup | · 1991 → |

In the inaugural edition of the tournament, Lise Gregory and Gretchen Magers won the title by defeating Manon Bollegraf and Jo Durie 6–2, 4–6, 6–3 in the final.

== Seeds ==
1. (Argentina) Mercedes Paz / (Spain) Arantxa Sánchez Vicario (semifinals)
2. (South Africa) Lise Gregory / (United States) Gretchen Magers (champions)
3. (Netherlands) Manon Bollegraf / (United Kingdom) Jo Durie (final)
4. (Italy) Laura Golarsa / (West Germany) Claudia Kohde-Kilsch (semifinals)

== Draw ==
=== Key ===
- Q = Qualifier
- WC = Wild card
- LL = Lucky loser
- Alt = Alternate
- SE = Special exempt
- PR = Protected ranking
- ITF = ITF entry
- JE = Junior exempt
- w/o = Walkover
- r = Retired
- d = Defaulted
- SR = Special ranking

=== Draw ===
First round
1 | (Argentina) M Paz (Spain) A Sánchez Vicario | 6 | 6
(Austria) B Paulus (Czechoslovakia) R Zrubáková | 1 | 0
(West Germany) Juliana Gorka (West Germany) Barbel Wohlfahrt | 1 | 1
(Czechoslovakia) I Jankovská (Czechoslovakia) E Melicharová | 6 | 6
3 | (Netherlands) M Bollegraf (United Kingdom) J Durie | 6 | 6
(United Kingdom) B Borneo (United Kingdom) J Salmon | 4 | 3
(West Germany) C Schneider (Czechoslovakia) A Strnadová | 6^{2} | 7 | 6
(Czechoslovakia) A Noháčová (Czechoslovakia) R Rajchrtová | 7^{7} | 5 | 3
(United States) Sylvia Schenck (United States) G Helgeson | 6 | 6
(Austria) H Sprung (Brazil) L Tella | 2 | 3
(Australia) A Minter (United States) K Rinaldi | 1 | 2
4 | (Italy) L Golarsa (West Germany) C Kohde-Kilsch | 6 | 6
(Sweden) C Lindqvist (Spain) C Martínez | 3 | 6 | 6
(Czechoslovakia) I Budařová (Czechoslovakia) D Krajčovičová | 6 | 0 | 2
(Netherlands) G Coorengel (United Kingdom) K Hand | 3 | 2
2 | (South Africa) L Gregory (United States) G Magers | 6 | 6

Quarterfinals
1 | (Argentina) M Paz (Spain) A Sánchez Vicario | 4 | 6 | 7
(Czechoslovakia) I Jankovská (Czechoslovakia) E Melicharová | 6 | 1 | 5
3 | (Netherlands) M Bollegraf (United Kingdom) J Durie | 6 | 6
(West Germany) C Schneider (Czechoslovakia) A Strnadová | 2 | 2
(United States) S Schenck (United States) G Helgeson | 1 | 1
4 | (Italy) L Golarsa (West Germany) C Kohde-Kilsch | 6 | 6
(Sweden) C Lindqvist (Spain) C Martínez | 0 | 1
2 | (South Africa) L Gregory (United States) G Magers | 6 | 6

Semifinals
1 | (Argentina) M Paz (Spain) A Sánchez Vicario | 6^{5} | 4
3 | (Netherlands) M Bollegraf (United Kingdom) J Durie | 7^{7} | 6
4 | (Italy) L Golarsa (West Germany) C Kohde-Kilsch | 3 | 7^{7} | 6^{4}
2 | (South Africa) L Gregory (United States) G Magers | 6 | 6^{3} | 7^{7}

Final
3 | (Netherlands) M Bollegraf (United Kingdom) J Durie | 2 | 6 | 3
2 | (South Africa) L Gregory (United States) G Magers | 6 | 4 | 6
