= 1991 Volkswagen Cup – Doubles =

Doubles
- 1991 Volkswagen Cup

Final
- Champions: (Netherlands) Manon Bollegraf (France) Isabelle Demongeot
- Runners-up: (Canada) Jill Hetherington (United States) Kathy Rinaldi
- Score: 6–4, 6–3

Details
- Draw: 16 (1Q)
- Seeds: 4

Events
Singles	Doubles
← 1990 ·	Sparkassen Cup	· 1992 →

Gretchen Magers and Lise Gregory were the defending champions, but none competed this year.

Manon Bollegraf and Isabelle Demongeot won the title by defeating Jill Hetherington and Kathy Rinaldi 6–4, 6–3 in the final.

== Seeds ==
1. (Canada) Jill Hetherington / (United States) Kathy Rinaldi (final)
2. (Netherlands) Manon Bollegraf / (France) Isabelle Demongeot (champions)
3. (Soviet Union) Leila Meskhi / (Argentina) Mercedes Paz (semifinals)
4. (Czechoslovakia) Jana Novotná / (Czechoslovakia) Andrea Strnadová (semifinals)

== Draw ==
=== Key ===
- Q = Qualifier
- WC = Wild card
- LL = Lucky loser
- Alt = Alternate
- SE = Special exempt
- PR = Protected ranking
- ITF = ITF entry
- JE = Junior exempt
- w/o = Walkover
- r = Retired
- d = Defaulted
- SR = Special ranking

=== Draw ===
First round
1	(Canada) J Hetherington (United States) K Rinaldi	6	6
(Luxembourg) K Kschwendt (Germany) B Rittner	1	2
Q	(Germany) M Kochta (Austria) S Reichel	3	3
(Germany) E Pfaff (Germany) C Porwik	6	6
3	(Soviet Union) L Meskhi (Argentina) M Paz	6	6
(United States) L Harvey Wild (Germany) S Meier	1	3
(Czechoslovakia) P Langrová (Czechoslovakia) R Zrubáková	7^{7}	6
(Czechoslovakia) I Jankovská (Czechoslovakia) E Melicharová	6^{3}	3
(Czechoslovakia) A Noháčová (Czechoslovakia) D Szabová	6	6
(Czechoslovakia) R Bobková (Germany) S Lohmann	4	3
(Netherlands) C Bakkum (Israel) I Berger	2	4
4	(Czechoslovakia) J Novotná (Czechoslovakia) A Strnadová	6	6
(Soviet Union) V Milvidskaia (Austria) H Sprung	7	3	6
(Belgium) E Callens (Germany) W Probst	5	6	4
(Soviet Union) E Brioukhovets (Czechoslovakia) E Švíglerová	4	6	3
2	(Netherlands) M Bollegraf (France) I Demongeot	6	3	6

Quarterfinals
1	(Canada) J Hetherington (United States) K Rinaldi	6	6
(Germany) E Pfaff (Germany) C Porwik	4	2
3	(Soviet Union) L Meskhi (Argentina) M Paz	6	6
(Czechoslovakia) P Langrová (Czechoslovakia) R Zrubáková	2	2
(Czechoslovakia) A Noháčová (Czechoslovakia) D Szabová	0	2
4	(Czechoslovakia) J Novotná (Czechoslovakia) A Strnadová	6	6
(Soviet Union) V Milvidskaia (Austria) H Sprung	2	4
2	(Netherlands) M Bollegraf (France) I Demongeot	6	6

Semifinals
1	(Canada) J Hetherington (United States) K Rinaldi	6	6
3	(Soviet Union) L Meskhi (Argentina) M Paz	1	3
4	(Czechoslovakia) J Novotná (Czechoslovakia) A Strnadová	1	6	3
2	(Netherlands) M Bollegraf (France) I Demongeot	6	3	6

Final
1	(Canada) J Hetherington (United States) K Rinaldi	4	3
2	(Netherlands) M Bollegraf (France) I Demongeot	6	6
