= 1992 Volkswagen Cup Damen Grand Prix =

- Date: 28 September – 4 October
- Edition: 3rd
- Category: Tier III
- Draw: 32S / 16D
- Prize money: $225,000
- Surface: Carpet / indoor
- Location: Leipzig, Germany
- Venue: Fairhall 6 & 7

Champions

Singles
- (Germany) Steffi Graf

Doubles
- (Czechoslovakia) Jana Novotná (Latvia) Larisa Savchenko-Neiland
← 1991 ·	WTA Leipzig	· 1993 →

The 1992 Volkswagen Cup Damen Grand Prix was a women's tennis tournament played on indoor carpet courts at the Fairhall 6 & 7 in Leipzig in Germany that was part of the Tier III category of the 1992 WTA Tour. It was the third edition of the tournament and was held from 27 September until 4 October 1992. First-seeded Steffi Graf won the singles title, her third consecutive at the event, and earned $45,000 first-prize money as well as 240 ranking points.

== Finals ==
=== Singles ===
(Germany) Steffi Graf defeated (Czechoslovakia) Jana Novotná 6–3, 1–6, 6–4

- It was Graf's 5th singles title of the year and the 66th of her career.

=== Doubles ===
(Czechoslovakia) Jana Novotná / (Latvia) Larisa Savchenko-Neiland defeated (United States) Patty Fendick / (Czechoslovakia) Andrea Strnadová 7–5, 7–6^{(7–4)}

- It was Novotná's 5th doubles title of the year and the 37th of her career. It was Savchenko-Neiland's 7th doubles title of the year and the 36th of her career.
