= 1993 Volkswagen Card Cup =

- Date: 27 September – 3 October
- Edition: 4th
- Category: Tier II
- Draw: 32S / 12D
- Prize money: $375,000
- Surface: Carpet / indoor
- Location: Leipzig, Germany
- Venue: Messehalle 7

Champions

Singles
- (Germany) Steffi Graf

Doubles
- (United States) Gigi Fernández; (Belarus) Natasha Zvereva
← 1992 ·	WTA Leipzig	· 1994 →

The 1993 Volkswagen Card Cup was a women's tennis tournament played on indoor carpet courts at the Messehalle 7 in Leipzig in Germany that was part of the Tier II category of the 1993 WTA Tour. It was the fourth edition of the tournament and was held from 27 September until 3 October 1993. First-seeded Steffi Graf won the singles title, her fourth consecutive at the event, and earned $75,000 first-prize money as well as 300 ranking points.

== Finals ==
=== Singles ===
(Germany) Steffi Graf defeated (Czechoslovakia) Jana Novotná 6–2, 6–0

- It was Graf's 9th singles title of the year and the 78th of her career.

=== Doubles ===
(United States) Gigi Fernández / (Belarus) Natasha Zvereva defeated (Latvia) Larisa Neiland / (Czechoslovakia) Jana Novotná 6–3, 6–2

- It was Fernández' 10th doubles title of the year and the 41st of her career. It was Zvereva's 9th doubles title of the year and the 37th of her career.
