= Steffi Graf =

German tennis player (born 1969)

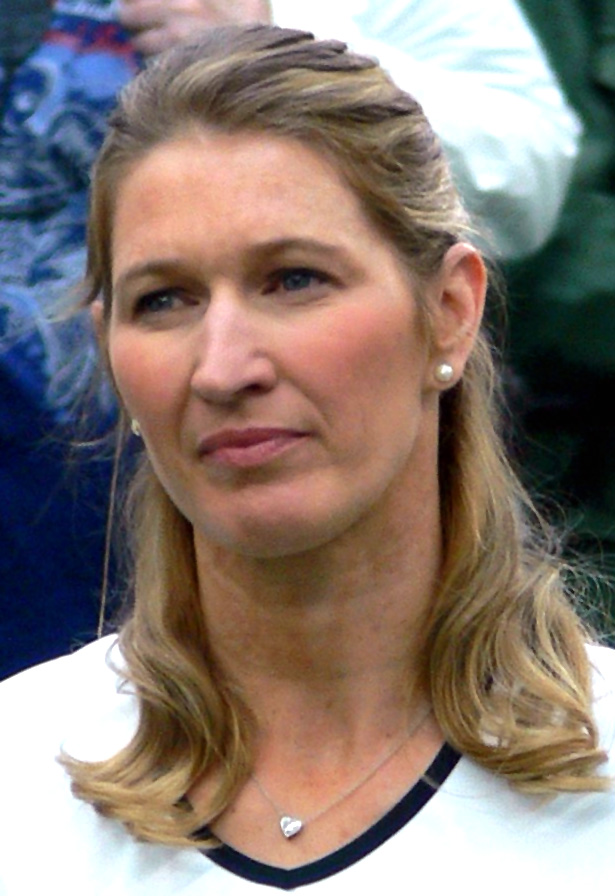
- Graf in 2010
- Full name: Stefanie Maria Graf
- Country (sports): West Germany (1982–1990); Germany (1990–1999)
- Residence: Las Vegas, Nevada, U.S.
- Born: 14 June 1969 (age 57) Mannheim, West Germany
- Height: 1.75 m (5 ft 9 in)
- Turned pro: 1982
- Retired: 1999
- Plays: Right-handed (one-handed backhand)
- Coach: Peter Graf; Pavel Složil (1986–1991); Heinz Günthardt (1992–1999)
- Prize money: $21,895,277: 25th all-time in earnings
- Int. Tennis HoF: 2004 (member page)

Singles
- Career record: 900–115 (88.67%)
- Career titles: 107 (3rd all-time)
- Highest ranking: No. 1 (17 August 1987)

Grand Slam singles results
- Australian Open: W (1988, 1989, 1990, 1994)
- French Open: W (1987, 1988, 1993, 1995, 1996, 1999)
- Wimbledon: W (1988, 1989, 1991, 1992, 1993, 1995, 1996)
- US Open: W (1988, 1989, 1993, 1995, 1996)

Other tournaments
- Tour Finals: W (1987, 1989, 1993, 1995, 1996)
- Olympic Games: W (1988)

Doubles
- Career record: 173–72 (70.6%)
- Career titles: 11
- Highest ranking: No. 3 (3 March 1987)

Grand Slam doubles results
- Australian Open: SF (1988, 1989)
- French Open: F (1986, 1987, 1989)
- Wimbledon: W (1988)
- US Open: SF (1986, 1987, 1988, 1989)

Other doubles tournaments
- Tour Finals: SF (1986, 1987, 1988)
- Olympic Games: SF (1988)

Mixed doubles
- Career record: 9–7

Grand Slam mixed doubles results
- Australian Open: 2R (1991)
- French Open: 2R (1994)
- Wimbledon: SF (1999)
- US Open: 1R (1984)

Team competitions
- Fed Cup: W (1987, 1992)
- Hopman Cup: W (1993)
Medal record
Representing West Germany
| Gold medal – first place | 1988 Seoul | Singles |
| Bronze medal – third place | 1988 Seoul | Doubles |
Representing Germany
| Silver medal – second place | 1992 Barcelona | Singles |

Stefanie Maria Graf (/ɡrɑːf, ɡræf/, German: [ˈʃtɛfi ˈɡʁaːf]; born 14 June 1969), known professionally as Steffi Graf and preferring to be called Stefanie since 2001, is a German former professional tennis player. (Note: She is now a naturalized American citizen, and was nominated as one of 2022's Great US Immigrants by Carnegie Corporation of New York.) She was ranked as the world No. 1 in women's singles by the Women's Tennis Association (WTA) for a record 377 weeks, and finished as the year-end No. 1 a record eight times. Graf won 107 singles titles on the WTA Tour, including 22 major women's singles titles, the second-most since the start of the Open Era in 1968 and the third-most of all time. She is the only tennis player to have won each major singles tournament at least four times—a quadruple career Grand Slam.

A teenage phenomenon, Graf became the youngest player to appear in the main draw of a major at the 1983 French Open aged 13. She improved over the following years and emerged as the player who ended Chris Evert and Martina Navratilova's dominance on women's tennis, winning her first major at the 1987 French Open. In 1988, Graf ascended to dominance, becoming the first tennis player to achieve the Golden Slam by winning all four major titles and the Olympic gold medal in the same calendar year. The following years saw her remain the best player in the world, but struggle with injuries and the rise of young rivals, especially Monica Seles. After the stabbing of Seles in 1993, Graf returned to dominance on the women's tour for several years. Following more injuries in 1997 and 1998, in 1999 Graf captured her 22nd and final major title at the French Open, reached the Wimbledon final, and retired from the sport, aged 30 and ranked as the world No. 3.

Graf's game was noted for versatility across all playing surfaces, footwork, and powerful forehand drive. Her athletic ability and aggressive game played from the baseline have been credited with developing the style of play that dominates today's game. Billie Jean King said, "Steffi [Graf] is definitely the greatest women's tennis player of all time." Graf was named the greatest woman tennis player of the 20th century by the Associated Press; asked in 2016 to name the greatest players of all time, Serena Williams answered Graf and Roger Federer. Graf was inducted into the Tennis Hall of Fame in 2004. Along with Boris Becker, Graf is considered instrumental in popularizing tennis in Germany. She has been married to fellow tennis player Andre Agassi since 2001.

== Early life ==
Stefanie Graf was born on 14 June 1969, in Mannheim, Baden-Württemberg, West Germany, to Heidi Schalk and car-and-insurance salesman Peter Graf (18 June 1938 − 30 November 2013). When she was nine years old, her family moved to the neighboring town of Brühl. She has a younger brother, Michael.

Her father, an aspiring tennis coach, first introduced her to the game, teaching his three-year-old daughter how to swing a wooden racket in the family's living room. She began practicing on a court at the age of four and played in her first tournament at five. She soon began taking the top prize at junior tournaments with regularity, going on to win the European Championships 12s and 18s in 1982.

== Career ==
=== Early career ===
Graf played in her first professional tournament in October 1982 at Filderstadt, Germany. She lost her first round match 6–4, 6–0 to Tracy Austin, a two-time US Open champion and former world No. 1 player.

At the start of her first full professional year in 1983, Graf was 13 years old and ranked world No. 124. She won no titles during the next three years, but her ranking climbed steadily to world No. 98 in 1983, No. 22 in 1984, and No. 6 in 1985. In 1984, she first gained international attention when she almost upset the tenth seed, Jo Durie of the United Kingdom, in a fourth round Centre Court match at Wimbledon. In August as a 15-year-old (and youngest entrant) representing West Germany, she won the tennis demonstration event at the 1984 Olympic Games in Los Angeles. No medals were awarded as this was not an official Olympic event.

Graf's schedule was closely controlled by her father Peter Graf, who limited her play so that she would not burn out. In 1985, for instance, she played only ten events leading up to the US Open, whereas another up-and-coming star, Gabriela Sabatini, played 21. Peter Graf also kept a tight rein on his daughter's personal life. Social invitations on the tour were often declined as Graf's focus was kept on practicing and match play. Working with her father and then-coach Pavel Složil, Graf typically practiced for up to four hours a day, often heading straight from airports to practice courts. This narrow focus meant that Graf, already shy and retiring by nature, made few friends on the tour in her early years, but it led to a steady improvement in her play.

In 1985 and early 1986, Graf emerged as the top challenger to the dominance of Martina Navratilova and Chris Evert. During that period, she lost six times to Evert and three times to Navratilova, all in straight sets. She did not win a tournament but consistently reached tournament finals, semifinals and quarterfinals, with the highlight being a semifinal defeat to Navratilova at the US Open.

On 13 April 1986, Graf won her first WTA tournament and beat Evert for the first time in the final of the Family Circle Cup in Hilton Head, South Carolina (she never lost to Evert again, beating her seven more times over the next three and a half years). Graf then won her next three tournaments at Amelia Island, Indianapolis, and Berlin, culminating in a 6–2, 6–3 defeat of Navratilova in the final of the latter. Illness caused her to miss Wimbledon, and an accident where she broke a toe several weeks later also curtailed her play. She returned to win a small tournament at Mahwah just before the US Open where, in one of the most anticipated matches of the year, she encountered Navratilova in a semifinal. Navratilova prevailed over Graf in the semifinal 6–1, 6–7^{(7–3)}, 7–6^{(10–8)}, saving three match points in an epic spread over two days. Graf then won three consecutive indoor titles at Tokyo, Zurich, and Brighton, before once again contending with Navratilova at the season-ending Virginia Slims Championships in New York. This time, Navratilova beat Graf 7–6, 6–3, 6–2.

=== Breakthrough year: 1987 ===
Graf's Grand Slam tournament breakthrough came in 1987. She started the year strongly, with six tournament victories heading into the French Open, with the highlight being at the tournament in Miami, where she defeated Martina Navratilova in a semifinal and Chris Evert in the final and lost only 20 games in the seven rounds of the tournament. In the French Open final, Graf defeated Navratilova, who was the world No. 1, 6–4, 4–6, 8–6 after beating Sabatini in a three-set semifinal.

Graf then lost to Navratilova 7–5, 6–3 in the Wimbledon final, her first loss of the year. However, in the Federation Cup final in Vancouver, Canada, three weeks later, she defeated Evert easily 6–2, 6–1. The US Open ended anti-climactically as Navratilova defeated Graf in the final 7–6, 6–1.

Graf had a win–loss record of 75–2 for a 97.4 winning percentage in 1987, both losses coming to Navratilova as they split the four matches they played during the year. On 17 August, after defeating Evert in a straight set final in the Virginia Slims of Los Angeles, Graf overtook Navratilova for the world No. 1 ranking for the first time in her career, a ranking she would hold for the next 186 consecutive weeks, a record (it was tied by Serena Williams in 2016). Graf was the first player other than Navratilova or Evert to hold the top spot since Tracy Austin in 1980.

=== Golden Slam: 1988 ===
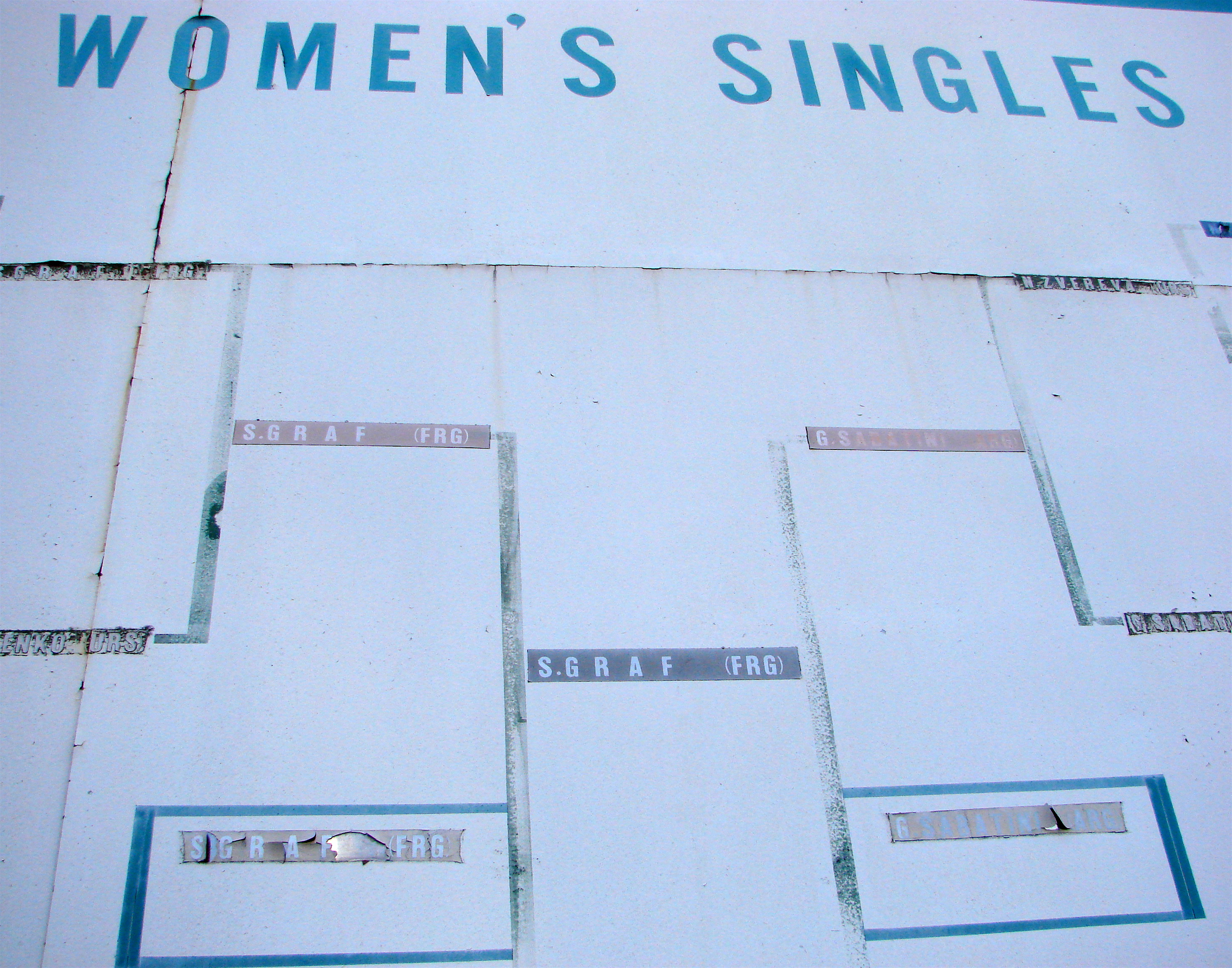
Seoul women's tennis results

Graf started 1988 by winning the Australian Open, defeating Chris Evert in the final 6–1, 7–6. Graf did not lose a set during the tournament and lost a total of only 29 games.

Graf lost twice to Sabatini during the spring, once on hardcourts in Boca Raton, Florida, and once on clay at Amelia Island, Florida. Graf, however, won the tournament in San Antonio, Texas, and retained her title in Miami, where she once again defeated Evert in the final. Graf then won the tournament in Berlin, losing only twelve games in five matches.

At the French Open, Graf successfully defended her title by defeating Natasha Zvereva 6–0, 6–0 in a 34-minute final. The official time of the match given on the scoresheet was 34 minutes; however, just 32 minutes of that was spent on the court, as a rain break split the match into two periods of play, of nine and 23 minutes. That was the shortest-ever and most one-sided Grand Slam tournament final ever and the first double bagel in a major final in the Open Era. Zvereva, who had eliminated Martina Navratilova in the fourth round, won only thirteen points in the match.

Next came Wimbledon, where Martina Navratilova had won six straight titles. Graf was trailing Martina Navratilova in the final 7–5, 2–0 before winning the match 5–7, 6–2, 6–1. She then won tournaments in Hamburg and Mahwah (where she lost only eight games all tournament).

At the US Open, Graf beat Sabatini in a three-set final, 6–3, 3–6, 6–1, to win the Grand Slam, a feat previously performed by only two other women, Maureen Connolly Brinker in 1953 and Margaret Court in 1970. Graf's 1988 Grand Slam remains the only one in history completed on three surfaces (grass, clay, hard court), as all other Grand Slams in tennis history were achieved prior to the introduction of hard court at the US Open in 1978.

In reaching and winning all four Grand Slam finals, Graf became the first player in history to contest and win 28 Grand Slam singles matches in a single year; albeit including the unplayed walkover against Evert in the US Open. Even discounting that result, no other player had played and won 27 Grand Slam matches in a single year before. Since then, five players managed a 27–1 win–loss record, meaning all of them failed to win the Grand Slam: Graf in 1989 and 1993, Monica Seles in 1992, Martina Hingis in 1997, Roger Federer in 2006, and Novak Djokovic in 2015, 2021 and 2023.

Graf then defeated Sabatini 6–3, 6–3 in the gold medal match at the Olympic Games in Seoul and achieved what the media had dubbed the "Golden Slam", the first tennis player to do this. Graf also won her only Grand Slam doubles title that year—at Wimbledon partnering Sabatini—and picked up a women's doubles Olympic bronze medal. Graf was the first tennis player to achieve this.

At the year-ending Virginia Slims Championships, Graf was upset by Pam Shriver, only her third loss of the year. The loss deprived her of the Golden Super Slam. She was named the 1988 BBC Overseas Sports Personality of the Year.

At the end of the year, the municipality of Brühl, her hometown, gave her the title of honorary citizen.

=== New challengers and personal challenges ===
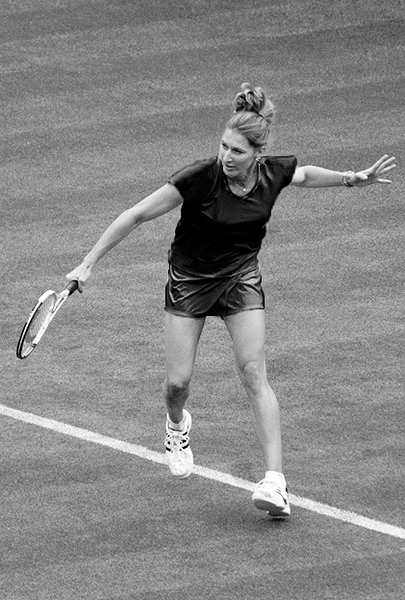
Graf backhand

==== 1989 ====
Speculation was rife at the beginning of 1989 about the possibility of Graf winning another Grand Slam. Some noted observers, such as Margaret Court, suggested that Graf could achieve the feat a couple more times. And the year began as expected, with Graf extending her Grand Slam tournament winning streak to five events at the Australian Open, defeating Helena Suková in the final. Her 6–3, 6–0 defeat of Gabriela Sabatini in a semifinal was described by veteran observer Ted Tinling as "probably the best tennis I've seen". He went on to add, "I saw what Steffi did to Sabatini at the Australian Open this year, and that was it. She is better than them all."

Graf followed this with easy victories in her next four tournaments at Washington, D.C., San Antonio, Texas, Boca Raton, Florida, and Hilton Head. The Washington, D.C. tournament was notable because Graf won the first twenty points of the final against Zina Garrison. In the Boca Raton final, Graf lost the only set she conceded to Chris Evert in their final seven matches.

In the subsequent Amelia Island final on clay, Graf lost her first match of the year to Sabatini but returned to European clay with easy victories at Hamburg and Berlin.

Graf's Grand Slam tournament winning streak ended at the French Open, where 17-year-old Spaniard Arantxa Sánchez Vicario beat Graf in three sets. Graf served for the match at 5–3 in the third set but lost the game and won only three more points in the match. Suffering from food poisoning, she had struggled to beat Monica Seles in their semifinal 6–3, 3–6, 6–3 and said that she had menstrual cramps in the final. Graf, however, recovered to defeat Martina Navratilova 6–2, 6–7, 6–1 in the Wimbledon final after defeating Monica Seles 6–0, 6–1 in a fourth round match, Arantxa Sánchez Vicario in a quarterfinal, and Chris Evert in a semifinal.

Graf warmed up for the US Open with easy tournament victories in San Diego and Mahwah. In her semifinal match at the US Open, Graf defeated Sabatini 3–6, 6–4, 6–2. The match was notable for its dramatic ending. Having suffered from leg cramps since the middle of the third set, Graf ran off the court seconds after match point to seek medical treatment. In the final, Navratilova led 6–3, 4–2 before Graf rallied to win 3–6, 7–5, 6–1 for her third Grand Slam singles title of the year.

Victories at Zurich and Brighton preceded the Virginia Slims Championships, where Graf cemented her top-ranked status by beating Navratilova in the four-set final. Graf ended 1989 with an 86–2 match record and the loss of only 12 sets. Her 0.977 winning percentage is the second-highest in the open era behind Navratilova.

==== 1990 ====
Graf defeated Mary Joe Fernández in the final of the Australian Open, which was her eighth Grand Slam singles title in the last nine she contested. She survived an intense three-set battle with Helena Sukova in the semis, breaking in the tenth and final game to win the third set 6–4. Her winning streak (unbeaten since the 1989 French Open loss to Arantxa Sánchez) continued with victories in Tokyo, Amelia Island, and Hamburg. Shortly after winning in Tokyo, Graf injured her right thumb while cross-country skiing in Switzerland and subsequently withdrew from the Virginia Slims of Florida and the Lipton Championships. In Berlin, she extended her unbeaten streak to 66 matches (second in WTA history to Navratilova's 74) before losing the final to Monica Seles, 4–6, 3–6.

While the Berlin tournament was being played, the largest-circulation German tabloid, Bild, ran a story about an alleged scandal involving Graf's father. The difficulty of answering questions about the matter came to a head at a Wimbledon press conference, where Graf broke down in tears. Wimbledon authorities then threatened to immediately shut down any subsequent press conferences where questions about the issue were asked. Whether this scandal affected Graf's form is open to debate. In an interview with Stern magazine in July 1990, Graf stated, "I could not fight as usual."

Graf again lost to Monica Seles in the final of the French Open 6–7, 4–6. Seles was behind 2–6 in the first-set tiebreaker, but then came back to win six points in a row and take the set. At Wimbledon, Graf lost in the semifinals to Zina Garrison, who with this victory broke Graf's string of 13 consecutive major finals. This was a major upset as Garrison had to save a match point to defeat Monica Seles in the quarterfinal, and was expected to easily fall to Graf, whom she had not beaten in four years. After victories in Montreal and San Diego, Graf reached the US Open final, where she lost in straight sets to Sabatini. Graf won four indoor tournaments after the US Open, including a pair of straight-set wins over Sabatini in the finals of Zürich and Worcester. Although Sabatini got the best of Graf in the semifinals of the season-ending Virginia Slims Championships, Graf still finished the year as the top-ranked player.

==== 1991 ====
A mixture of injury problems, personal difficulties, and loss of form made 1991 a tough year for Graf. Seles established herself as the new dominant player on the women's tour, winning the Australian Open, French Open, and US Open and, in March, ending Graf's record 186 consecutive-weeks hold on the World No. 1 ranking. Graf briefly regained the top ranking after winning at Wimbledon but lost it again after her loss to Navratilova at the US Open.

Graf lost an Australian Open quarterfinal to Jana Novotná, the first time she did not reach the semifinals of a Grand Slam singles tournament since the 1986 French Open. She then lost to Sabatini in her next three tournaments before winning the U.S. Hardcourt Championships in San Antonio, beating Monica Seles in the final. After losing a fifth straight time to Sabatini in Amelia Island, Florida, Graf again defeated Seles in the Hamburg final. Following her tournament victory in German Open in Berlin, Graf suffered one of the worst defeats of her career in a French Open semifinal where she won only two games against Sánchez Vicario and lost her first 6–0 set since 1984. At Wimbledon, however, Graf captured her third women's crown, this time at Sabatini's expense. Sabatini served for the match twice, and was two points away from her first Wimbledon title. After breaking Sabatini's serve to even the third set at 6–6, Graf defeated Sabatini by winning the next two games to take the match 6–4, 3–6, 8–6. Martina Navratilova then defeated Graf 7–6, 6–7, 6–4 in a US Open semifinal, the first time she had beaten Graf in four years. Graf then won in Leipzig, with her 500th career victory coming in a quarterfinal against Judith Wiesner. After winning two more indoor tournaments at Zurich and Brighton, she failed once again in the Virginia Slims Championships, losing her quarterfinal to Novotná. Soon after, she split with her long-time coach, Pavel Složil.

==== 1992 ====
A bout of rubella forced Graf to miss the first major event of 1992, the Australian Open. Her year continued indifferently with losses in three of her first four tournaments, including a semifinal loss to Jana Novotná in Chicago. It was Graf's second consecutive loss to Novotna, and dating back to their 1991 Australian Open quarterfinal match, Jana had won three of their last five meetings. It would also be the last loss Graf would ever have to Novotna in a match she completed (she did have a loss after withdrawing with injury after the first set of a late 1996 match). Chicago was notable, however, for being the first tournament Graf played with her new coach, former Swiss player Heinz Günthardt. Graf's father had approached Günthardt during the 1991 Virginia Slims Championships. She would work with him for the remainder of her career. In Boca Raton, Florida, Graf reached her first final of the year, where she faced Conchita Martínez for the title. In their five previous head-to-head matches, Graf had defeated Martínez each time. Even though she lost the opening set, Graf went on to prevail in three sets. She lost twice to Sabatini in the early spring at the Lipton International and the Bausch & Lomb Championships, which now brought her to seven losses in her last eight matches against Sabatini; however, the Bausch & Lomb loss would be Graf's final loss to Sabatini, winning her next, and last eight matches against Sabatini.

Victories at Hamburg and Berlin (beating Sánchez Vicario in the finals of both) prepared her for the French Open, where she defeated Sánchez Vicario in the semifinals after losing the first set 6–0. Graf then lost a closely contested final to Monica Seles, 2–6, 6–3, 8–10. Seles won the match on her fifth match point; Graf came within two points of winning the match a few games earlier. At Wimbledon, after struggling through early-round three-setters against Mariaan de Swardt and Patty Fendick, she easily defeated Natasha Zvereva in the quarterfinal, Sabatini in the semifinal, and Seles in the final, 6–2, 6–1, with Seles playing in almost complete silence because of widespread media and player criticism of her grunting. Graf then won all five of her Fed Cup matches, helping Germany defeat Spain in the final by defeating Arantxa Sánchez Vicario, 6–4, 6–2. At the Olympic Games in Barcelona, Graf lost to Jennifer Capriati in the final and claimed the silver medal. At the US Open, Graf was upset in the quarterfinals by Sánchez Vicario 7–6, 6–3. Four consecutive indoor tournament victories in the autumn helped improve her season, but for the third consecutive year, she failed to win the Virginia Slims Championships, where she lost in the first round to Lori McNeil.

=== Second period of dominance ===
==== 1993 ====
Graf began 1993 with four losses in her first six tournaments of the year: two to Sánchez Vicario and one each to Seles and the 36-year-old Martina Navratilova. Seles defeated Graf at the Australian Open 4–6, 6–3, 6–2. She struggled at the German Open in Berlin where she lost a 6–0 set to the unheralded Sabine Hack before defeating Mary Joe Fernández and Sabatini in three-set matches to claim her seventh title there in eight years.

During a quarterfinal match between Seles and Magdalena Maleeva in Hamburg, Seles was stabbed between the shoulder blades by a mentally ill German fan of Graf, Günter Parche. He claimed that he committed the attack to help Graf reclaim the world No. 1 ranking. More than two years elapsed before Seles competed again. Shortly after the stabbing, during a players meeting at the Italian Open in Rome, 17 of the world's top 25 WTA members voted against preserving Seles' world No. 1 ranking while she was sidelined. Since Graf skipped the Italian Open, she did not take part in the vote.

During Seles's absence, Graf won 65 of 67 matches, three of four Grand Slam events and the year-end Virginia Slims championships. She won her first French Open title since 1988 with a three-set victory over Mary Joe Fernández in the final. Fernandez had two break points to take a 3–0 and double break lead in the third set. The win elevated Graf to the world No. 1 ranking for the first time in 22 months. At Wimbledon, Graf defeated Jana Novotná to win her third consecutive, and fifth overall, ladies' title. In the third and deciding set, Novotná had a point to go up 5–1 on her serve. After breaking Novotná's serve, Graf won the next four games to take the match 7–6, 1–6, 6–4. Graf had a bone splinter in her right foot during this tournament (and for the next few months), finally resulting in surgery on 4 October.

In the meantime, she lost surprisingly to Nicole Bradtke of Australia in a Fed Cup match on clay before winning the Acura Classic in San Diego and the Canadian Open in Toronto in preparation for the US Open. She won there, comfortably beating Helena Suková in the final after needing three sets to eliminate Gabriela Sabatini and Manuela Maleeva-Fragniere in the quarterfinals and semifinals respectively. In the fall, Graf won the Volkswagen Card Cup in Leipzig a day before her foot operation, losing only two games to Jana Novotná in the final. Graf lost to Conchita Martínez in her comeback tournament a month later in Philadelphia. However, she finished her year with a highlight, winning her first Virginia Slims Championships since 1989 by beating Arantxa Sánchez Vicario in the final despite needing painkillers for a back injury.

==== 1994 ====
Seemingly free of injury for the first time in years, Graf began the year by winning the Australian Open, where she defeated Arantxa Sánchez Vicario in the final with the loss of only two games. Graf later stated it was the best tennis she had ever played in a Grand Slam final. She then won her next four tournaments in Tokyo, Indian Wells, Delray Beach and Miami respectively. In the Miami final, she lost her first set of the year—to Natasha Zvereva—after winning 54 consecutive sets. In the Hamburg final, she lost for the first time in 1994 after 36 consecutive match victories, losing to Sánchez Vicario in three sets. She then won her eighth German Open, but there were signs that her form was worsening as she almost lost to Julie Halard in a quarterfinal. As the defending champion Graf lost in straight sets to Mary Pierce in the French Open semifinal. This was followed by a first-round straight-sets loss at Wimbledon to Lori McNeil, her only loss at Wimbledon between 1991 and 1997 and her first loss in a first round Grand Slam tournament in ten years. Graf still managed to win San Diego the following month but aggravated a long-time back injury in beating Sánchez Vicario in the final. Graf developed a bone spur at the base of her spine due to a congenital condition of the sacroiliac joint. She began to wear a back brace and was unsure about playing the US Open but elected to play while receiving treatment and stretching for two hours before each match. She made it to the final and took the first set against Sánchez Vicario but lost the next two sets—Sanchez Vicario's last victory over Graf. In the middle of the second set, Graf suffered back spasms while reaching for a ball in the ad court. She took the following nine weeks off, returning only for the Virginia Slims Championships where she lost in straight sets to Pierce in the quarterfinal. Although Graf ended the year ranked No. 1 on the computer the ITF named Sanchez Vicario its World Champion for the year, while the WTA backed their official rankings and named Graf.

==== 1995 ====
A strained right calf muscle forced Graf to withdraw from the Australian Open. She came back in February, winning four consecutive tournaments in Paris, Delray Beach, Miami and Houston. She then beat Sánchez Vicario in the finals of both the French Open and Wimbledon. The 1995 Wimbledon final is regarded as one of the most dramatic women's major finals in history as Graf and Sánchez Vicario battled in a tight third set that included a 16-minute long, 13-deuce game on Sanchez Vicario's serve at 5–5. In August Monica Seles made her much anticipated return to tennis at the Canadian Open. It was decided to grant her a joint number-one ranking with Graf who took her first loss of the year in the first round to Amanda Coetzer. The US Open was Monica Seles's first Grand Slam event since the 1993 attack, with much anticipation again around a potential Seles-Graf final. After surviving a scare in a three-setter against Amanda Coetzer in the first round, Graf reached the final with relative ease, while Seles went through her side of the draw in even more convincing fashion. Seles and Graf met in the final, with Graf winning in three sets, saving a set point in the first set. Graf then capped the year by beating countrywoman Anke Huber in a five-set final at the season-ending WTA Championships in 2 hours and 46 minutes.

===== Tax issues =====
In personal terms, 1995 was a difficult year for Graf, as she was accused by German authorities of tax evasion in the early years of her career. In her defense, she stated that her father Peter was her financial manager, and all financial matters relating to her earnings at the time had been under his control. Her father was arrested in August and was sentenced to 45 months in jail. He was eventually released after serving 25 months. Prosecutors dropped their case against Graf in 1997, when she agreed to pay a fine of 1.3 million Deutsche Marks to the government and an unspecified charity.

==== 1996 ====
Graf again missed the Australian Open after undergoing surgery in December 1995 to remove bone splinters from her left foot. Graf came back to the tour in March, winning back to back titles in Indian Wells and Miami, followed by a record ninth title at the German Open in May and a quarterfinal defeat in Rome against Martina Hingis. She then successfully defended the three Grand Slam titles she won the year before. In a close French Open final, Graf again overcame Sánchez Vicario, taking the third set 10–8. Graf had led 4–1 in the second set tiebreak, only to lose six points in a row and force a decider. Twice in the third set Sánchez Vicario served for the championship but was broken each time by Graf. It was the longest French Open women's singles final in history, both in terms of time (3 hours and 3 minutes) and number of games played (40). Graf then had a straight-sets win against Sánchez Vicario in the Wimbledon final. That was the last competitive match Graf and Sánchez Vicario would ever play against one another. In July, a left knee injury forced Graf to withdraw from the Summer Olympics in Atlanta. Graf played only one warm-up event ahead of the US Open, the Acura Classic in Manhattan Beach, California, where she lost to Lindsay Davenport in the semifinals. She then successfully defended her title at the US Open, defeating Monica Seles in the final. Her toughest battle came against rising star Martina Hingis in the semifinal, with Hingis unable to convert on five set points. Graf did not lose a set the whole tournament. She also won her fifth and final WTA Tour Championships title with a five set win over Martina Hingis, with Hingis cramping up in the fifth set. In 1988, Graf became only the second tennis player in history to win a Slam on hardcourt, clay, and grass all in the same season. She repeated the feat in 1993, 1995, and 1996.

=== Final years on the tour: 1997–99 ===
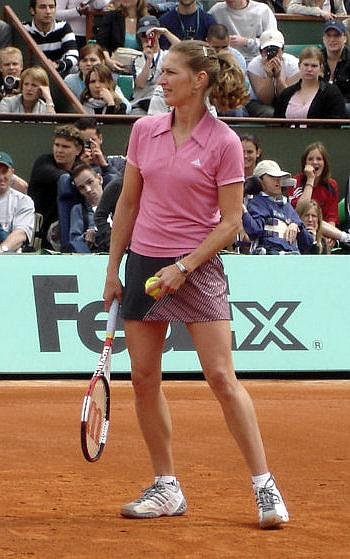
Graf in 2005

The last few years of Graf's career were beset by injuries, particularly to her knees and back. She lost the world No. 1 ranking to Martina Hingis and failed to win a Grand Slam title for the first time in ten years in 1997. That year Graf lost in the fourth round of the Australian Open in straight sets to Amanda Coetzer. She subsequently withdrew from the Pan Pacific Open and had arthroscopic surgery performed on her left knee. After several months injury lay off, Graf returned to play in the German Open in Berlin in front of a home crowd and had the worst defeat of her career in the quarterfinal, when Amanda Coetzer beat her in just 56 minutes 6–0, 6–1. In the French Open Graf was again beaten by Amanda Coetzer in straight sets, 6–1, 6–4. Only one week later, she underwent reconstructive knee surgery in Vienna and subsequently missed the 1997 Wimbledon and US Open championships. The treatment was for a fracture of the cartilage as well as a shortening and partial rupture of the patellar tendon of her left knee. After missing almost half of the tour in 1998, Graf lost in the third round at Wimbledon and in the fourth round at the US Open. Shortly after the US Open, she underwent surgery to remove a bone spur in her right wrist. Upon her return Graf defeated world No. 2 Hingis and world No. 1 Lindsay Davenport en route to the Philadelphia title. At the first round of the season-ending Chase Championships, Graf defeated world No. 3, Jana Novotná, before losing in the semifinal to first-seeded Davenport.

At the beginning of 1999 Graf played the warm up event to the Australian Open in Sydney; she defeated Serena Williams in the second round and Venus in the quarterfinals before losing to Lindsay Davenport in the semifinal. Graf then went on to reach the quarterfinals of the Australian Open before losing to Monica Seles in two sets. In Indian Wells Graf lost to Serena Williams in three sets.

At the French Open, Graf reached her first Grand Slam final in three years and fought back from a set and twice from a break down in the second set to defeat the top ranked Hingis in three sets for a memorable victory. Graf became the first player in the open era to defeat the first, second, and third ranked players in the same Grand Slam tournament by beating second-ranked Davenport in the quarterfinals and third-ranked Seles in the semifinals. Graf said after the final that it would be her last French Open, fueling speculation about her retirement.

Graf then reached her ninth Wimbledon singles final, losing to third-seeded Davenport in straight sets. She had to overcome three difficult three set matches en route to this final, against Mariaan De Swardt in the second round, Venus Williams in the quarterfinals and Mirjana Lučić in the semifinals.

On 13 August 1999, shortly after retiring with a strained hamstring from a second round match against Amy Frazier in San Diego, Graf announced her retirement from the women's tour at age 30. She was ranked No. 3 at that time and said, "I have done everything I wanted to do in tennis. I feel I have nothing left to accomplish. The weeks following Wimbledon [in 1999] weren't easy for me. I was not having fun anymore. After Wimbledon, for the first time in my career, I didn't feel like going to a tournament. My motivation wasn't what it was in the past."

=== Doubles career ===
From the beginning of her career until 1990, Graf regularly played doubles matches in Grand Slams and other tournaments, winning a total of 11 doubles titles. In 1986, she formed a partnership with rival Gabriela Sabatini. The pair was moderately successful, winning the 1988 Wimbledon Championships together and reaching the finals of the French Open in 1986, 1987 and 1989. The partnership was the subject of much discussion, as the two women, both known to be shy, usually kept communication to a minimum during changeovers and between points, a highly unusual situation in doubles. Sabatini said of the partnership: "doubles is all about communicating with each other, and we didn't communicate that much. We would just say the basic things, but nothing else." The pair played their last major tournament together at the 1990 Wimbledon Championships, losing in the quarterfinals. From 1991 until the end of her career, Graf would only play doubles sporadically, forming short-term partnerships with a variety of players, including Lori McNeil, Anke Huber and her best friends on the tour, Rennae Stubbs, Patricia Tarabini and Ines Gorrochategui. She played her last Grand Slam doubles tournament at the 1999 Australian Open with Gorrochategui, losing in the second round.

Graf also occasionally played mixed doubles, although she never won a title. She partnered with doubles specialist Mark Woodforde at the Australian Open in 1994, with Henri Leconte at Wimbledon in 1991 and at the French Open in 1994, and with Charlie Pasarell at the US Open in 1984. In an unusual arrangement, she paired with her coaches Pavel Složil at Wimbledon in 1988 and Heinz Günthardt in 1992 and 1996, also at Wimbledon. At the 1999 Wimbledon Championships, Graf formed a much-publicized partnership with John McEnroe, with whom she reached the semifinals before withdrawing due to concerns that her uncertain hamstring, coupled with a bout of bronchitis, would affect her in the singles final.

=== Post-career exhibition matches ===
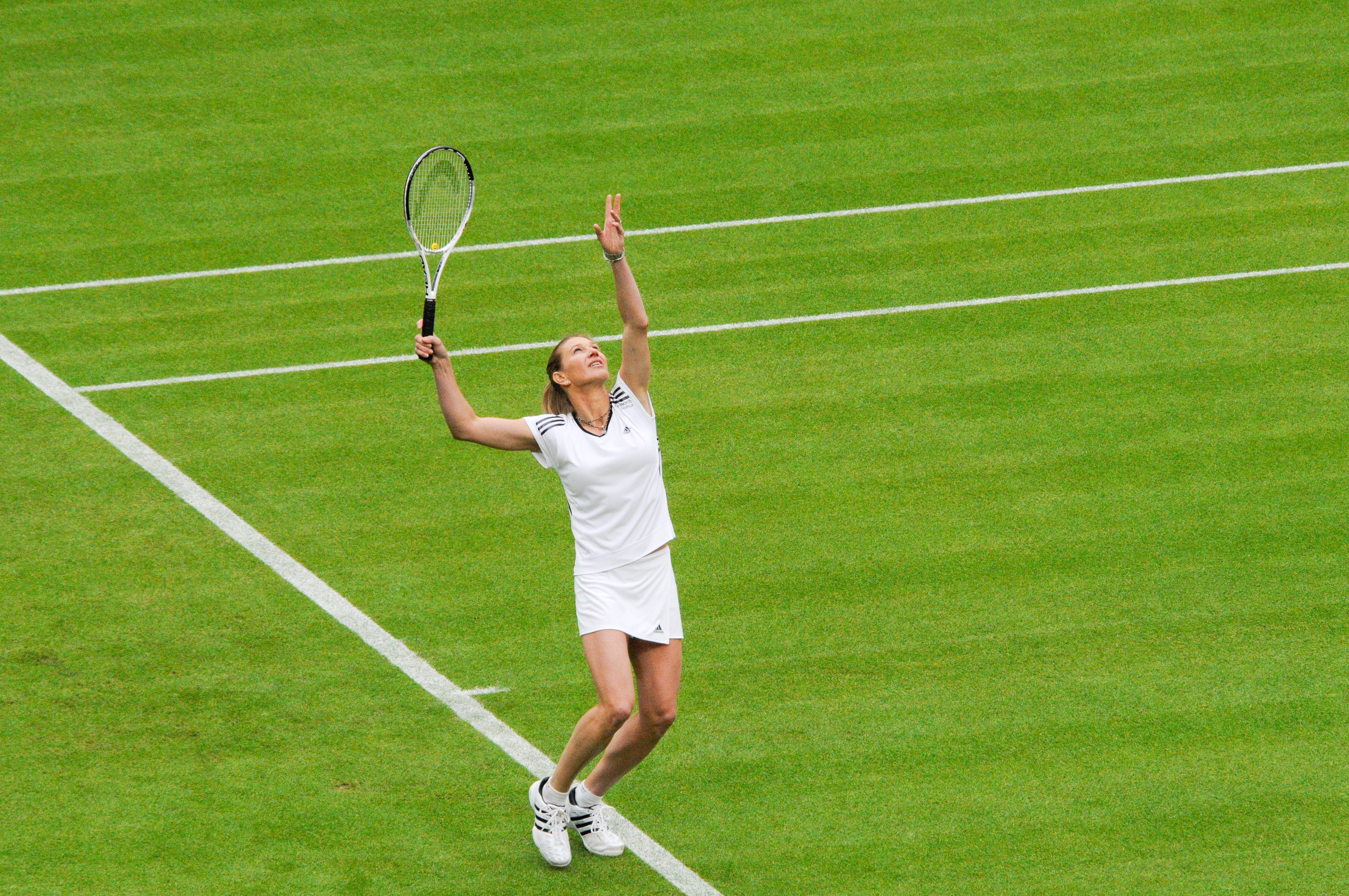
Graf at Wimbledon 2009

In late 1999 and early 2000, as part of her Farewell Tour, Graf played a series of exhibition matches against former rivals in New Zealand, Japan, Spain, Germany and South Africa. She played Jelena Dokic in Christchurch, New Zealand, Amanda Coetzer in Durban, South Africa, and her former rival Arantxa Sánchez Vicario in Zaragoza, Spain. It was Graf and Sánchez Vicario's first head-to-head meeting since 1996. In February 2000, Graf played against Kimiko Date at Tokyo Metropolitan Gymnasium in Tokyo, Nagoya Rainbow Hall in Nagoya, winning in three sets. In September 2004, Graf dispatched her former doubles partner Gabriela Sabatini, in straight sets, in an exhibition match played in Berlin, Germany. She was also in Berlin to host a charity gala, as well as inaugurating a tennis stadium renamed the "Steffi Graf Stadion". Proceeds from her match against Sabatini went to Graf's foundation, "Children for Tomorrow".

In July 2005, Graf competed in one tie of World Team Tennis (WTT) on the Houston Wranglers team. She was beaten in two out of three matches, with each match being one set. Graf lost her singles match to Elena Likhovtseva 5–4. She teamed with Ansley Cargill in women's doubles against Anna Kournikova and Likhovtseva but lost 5–2. She was successful, however, in the mixed doubles match. Graf completely ruled out a return to professional tennis. In October, Graf defeated Sabatini in an exhibition match in Mannheim, Germany, winning both of their sets. Like the exhibition match the previous year against Sabatini, proceeds went to "Children for Tomorrow".

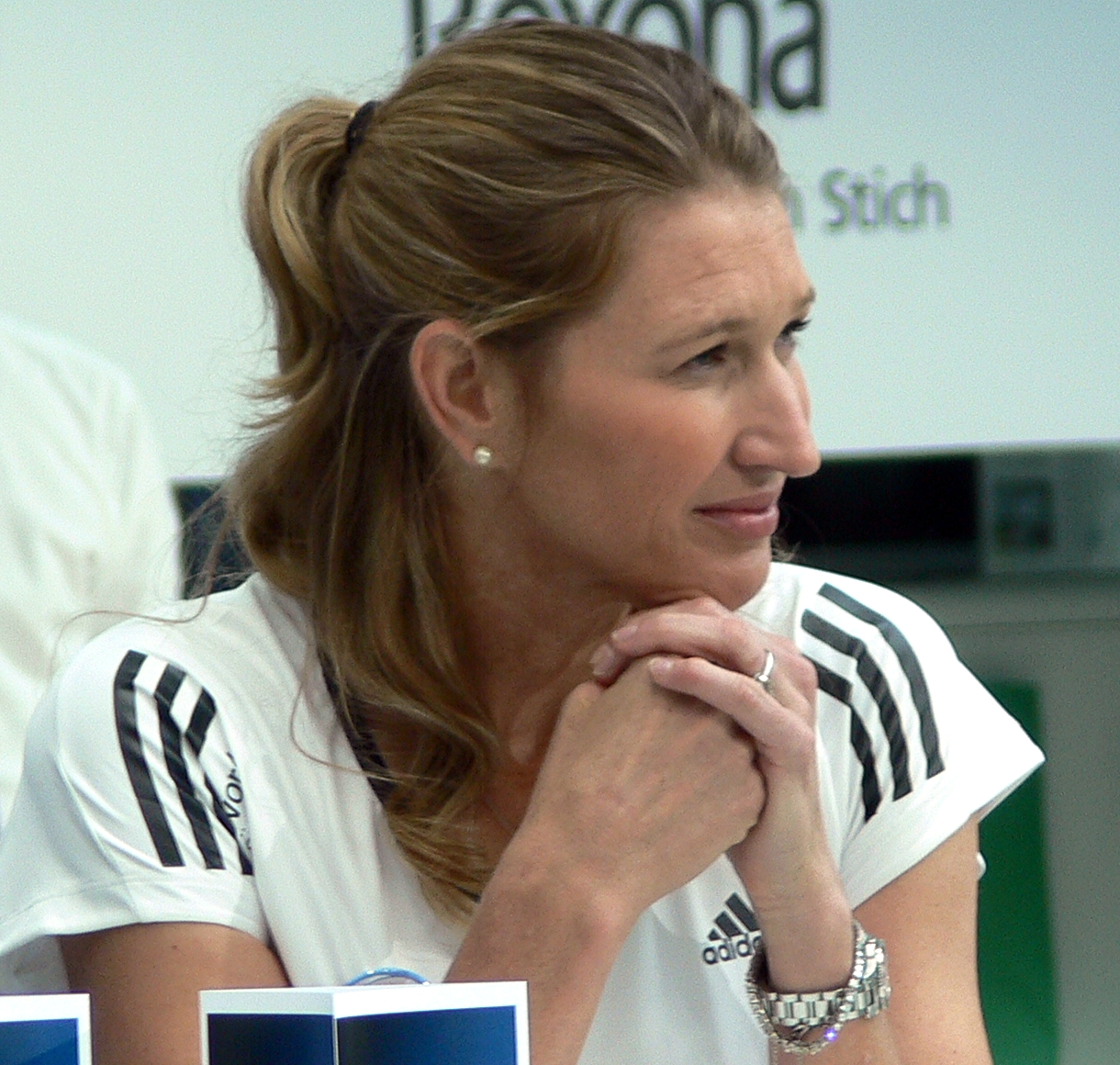
Graf at a charity tennis tournament in 2010

In 2008 Graf lost an exhibition match against Kimiko Date at Ariake Colosseum in Tokyo. As part of the event, billed as "Dream Match 2008", she defeated Martina Navratilova in a one-set affair 8–7, with Graf winning a tiebreaker 10–5. It was the first time in 14 years Graf had played Navratilova. Graf played a singles exhibition match against Kim Clijsters and a mixed doubles exhibition alongside husband Andre Agassi against Tim Henman and Clijsters as part of a test event and celebration for the newly installed roof over Wimbledon's Centre Court in 2009. She lost a lengthy one-set singles match to Clijsters and also the mixed doubles.

In 2010, Graf participated in the WTT Smash Hits exhibition in Washington, D.C. to support the Elton John AIDS Foundation. She and Agassi, her husband, were on Team Elton John, which competed against Team Billie Jean King. Graf played in the celebrity doubles, women's doubles, and mixed doubles before straining her left calf muscle and being replaced by Anna Kournikova.

=== Summary of career ===
Graf won seven singles titles at Wimbledon, six singles titles at the French Open, five singles titles at the US Open, and four singles titles at the Australian Open. Her overall record in 54 Grand Slam events was 278–32 (90 percent) (84–10 at the French Open, 74–7 at Wimbledon, 73–9 at the US Open, and 47–6 at the Australian Open). Her career prize-money earnings totalled US$21,895,277 (a record until Lindsay Davenport surpassed this amount in January 2008). Her singles win–loss record was 900–115 (88.7 percent). She was ranked world No. 1 for 186 consecutive weeks (from August 1987 to March 1991; tied with Serena Williams, a record in the women's game) and a record total 377 weeks overall.

== Career statistics ==
=== Grand Slam tournament performance timeline ===
Key
| **W** | F | SF | QF | #R | RR | Q# | DNQ | A | NH |

(W) winner; (F) finalist; (SF) semifinalist; (QF) quarterfinalist; (#R) rounds 4, 3, 2, 1; (RR) round-robin stage; (Q#) qualification round; (DNQ) did not qualify; (A) absent; (NH) not held; (SR) strike rate (events won / competed); (W–L) win–loss record.

| | West Germany | | | | | | | | Germany | | | | | | | | | | | |
| Tournament | 1983 | 1984 | 1985 | 1986 | 1987 | 1988 | 1989 | 1990 | 1991 | 1992 | 1993 | 1994 | 1995 | 1996 | 1997 | 1998 | 1999 | SR | W–L | Win % |
| Australian Open | 1R | 3R | A | NH | A | **W** | **W** | **W** | QF | A | F | **W** | A | A | 4R | A | QF | 4 / 10 | 47–6 | 89% |
| French Open | 2R | 3R | 4R | QF | **W** | **W** | F | F | SF | F | **W** | SF | **W** | **W** | QF | A | **W** | 6 / 16 | 84–10 | 89% |
| Wimbledon | LQ | 4R | 4R | A | F | **W** | **W** | SF | **W** | **W** | **W** | 1R | **W** | **W** | A | 3R | F | 7 / 14 | 74–7 | 91% |
| US Open | LQ | 1R | SF | SF | F | **W** | **W** | F | SF | QF | **W** | F | **W** | **W** | A | 4R | A | 5 / 14 | 73–9 | 89% |
| Win–loss | 1–2 | 7–4 | 11–3 | 9–2 | 19–2 | 27–0 | 27–1 | 24–3 | 21–3 | 17–2 | 26–1 | 18–3 | 21–0 | 21–0 | 7–2 | 5–2 | 17–2 | 22 / 54 | 278–32 | 90% |

Note: Graf's semifinal match at the 1988 US Open and 3rd round match at the 1993 US open were walkovers (so not counted as win)

=== Grand Slam tournament finals ===
==== Singles: 31 (22 titles, 9 runner-ups) ====
| Result | Year | Championship | Surface | Opponent | Score |
|---|---|---|---|---|---|
| Win | 1987 | French Open | Clay | (United States) Martina Navratilova | 6–4, 4–6, 8–6 |
| Loss | 1987 | Wimbledon | Grass | (United States) Martina Navratilova | 5–7, 3–6 |
| Loss | 1987 | US Open | Hard | (United States) Martina Navratilova | 6–7^{(4–7)}, 1–6 |
| Win | 1988 | Australian Open | Hard | (United States) Chris Evert | 6–1, 7–6^{(7–3)} |
| Win | 1988 | French Open (2) | Clay | (Soviet Union) Natasha Zvereva | 6–0, 6–0 |
| Win | 1988 | Wimbledon | Grass | (United States) Martina Navratilova | 5–7, 6–2, 6–1 |
| Win | 1988 | US Open | Hard | (Argentina) Gabriela Sabatini | 6–3, 3–6, 6–1 |
| Win | 1989 | Australian Open (2) | Hard | (Czechoslovakia) Helena Suková | 6–4, 6–4 |
| Loss | 1989 | French Open | Clay | (Spain) Arantxa Sánchez Vicario | 6–7^{(6–8)}, 6–3, 5–7 |
| Win | 1989 | Wimbledon (2) | Grass | (United States) Martina Navratilova | 6–2, 6–7^{(1–7)}, 6–1 |
| Win | 1989 | US Open (2) | Hard | (United States) Martina Navratilova | 3–6, 7–5, 6–1 |
| Win | 1990 | Australian Open (3) | Hard | (United States) Mary Joe Fernández | 6–3, 6–4 |
| Loss | 1990 | French Open | Clay | (Socialist Federal Republic of Yugoslavia) Monica Seles | 6–7^{(6–8)}, 4–6 |
| Loss | 1990 | US Open | Hard | (Argentina) Gabriela Sabatini | 2–6, 6–7^{(4–7)} |
| Win | 1991 | Wimbledon (3) | Grass | (Argentina) Gabriela Sabatini | 6–4, 3–6, 8–6 |
| Loss | 1992 | French Open | Clay | (Federal Republic of Yugoslavia) Monica Seles | 2–6, 6–3, 8–10 |
| Win | 1992 | Wimbledon (4) | Grass | (Federal Republic of Yugoslavia) Monica Seles | 6–2, 6–1 |
| Loss | 1993 | Australian Open | Hard | (Federal Republic of Yugoslavia) Monica Seles | 6–4, 3–6, 2–6 |
| Win | 1993 | French Open (3) | Clay | (United States) Mary Joe Fernández | 4–6, 6–2, 6–4 |
| Win | 1993 | Wimbledon (5) | Grass | (Czech Republic) Jana Novotná | 7–6^{(8–6)}, 1–6, 6–4 |
| Win | 1993 | US Open (3) | Hard | (Czech Republic) Helena Suková | 6–3, 6–3 |
| Win | 1994 | Australian Open (4) | Hard | (Spain) Arantxa Sánchez Vicario | 6–0, 6–2 |
| Loss | 1994 | US Open | Hard | (Spain) Arantxa Sánchez Vicario | 6–1, 6–7^{(3–7)}, 4–6 |
| Win | 1995 | French Open (4) | Clay | (Spain) Arantxa Sánchez Vicario | 7–5, 4–6, 6–0 |
| Win | 1995 | Wimbledon (6) | Grass | (Spain) Arantxa Sánchez Vicario | 4–6, 6–1, 7–5 |
| Win | 1995 | US Open (4) | Hard | (United States) Monica Seles | 7–6^{(8–6)}, 0–6, 6–3 |
| Win | 1996 | French Open (5) | Clay | (Spain) Arantxa Sánchez Vicario | 6–3, 6–7^{(4–7)}, 10–8 |
| Win | 1996 | Wimbledon (7) | Grass | (Spain) Arantxa Sánchez Vicario | 6–3, 7–5 |
| Win | 1996 | US Open (5) | Hard | (United States) Monica Seles | 7–5, 6–4 |
| Win | 1999 | French Open (6) | Clay | (Switzerland) Martina Hingis | 4–6, 7–5, 6–2 |
| Loss | 1999 | Wimbledon | Grass | (United States) Lindsay Davenport | 4–6, 5–7 |

==== Doubles: 4 (1 title, 3 runner-ups) ====
| Result | Year | Championship | Surface | Partner | Opponents | Score |
|---|---|---|---|---|---|---|
| Loss | 1986 | French Open | Clay | (Argentina) Gabriela Sabatini | (United States) Martina Navratilova (Hungary) Andrea Temesvári | 1–6, 2–6 |
| Loss | 1987 | French Open | Clay | (Argentina) Gabriela Sabatini | (United States) Martina Navratilova (United States) Pam Shriver | 2–6, 1–6 |
| Win | 1988 | Wimbledon | Grass | (Argentina) Gabriela Sabatini | (Soviet Union) Larisa Savchenko (Soviet Union) Natasha Zvereva | 6–3, 1–6, 12–10 |
| Loss | 1989 | French Open | Clay | (Argentina) Gabriela Sabatini | (Soviet Union) Larisa Savchenko (Soviet Union) Natasha Zvereva | 4–6, 4–6 |

=== Records ===
- These records were attained in Open Era of tennis.
- Records in **bold** indicate Open Era peer-less achievements.

| Time span | Selected Grand Slam tournament records | Players matched |
|---|---|---|
| 1988 Australian Open — 1988 Olympics | Golden Slam (4 majors + Olympic gold in same calendar year) | **Stands alone** |
| 1988 Australian Open — 1988 US Open | Grand Slam (4 majors in same calendar year) | Margaret Court |
| 1987 French Open — 1988 Olympics | Career Golden Slam | Serena Williams |
| 1987 French Open — 1988 US Open | Career Grand Slam | Margaret Court; Billie Jean King; Chris Evert; Martina Navratilova; Serena Williams; Maria Sharapova |
| 1993 French Open — 1994 Australian Open | Non-Calendar Year Grand Slam | Martina Navratilova; Serena Williams |
| 1993 French Open — 1994 Australian Open | Non-Calendar Year Grand Slam in addition to already winning a Grand Slam | **Stands alone** |
| 1988 Australian Open — 1990 Australian Open | Winner of 8 of 9 Grand Slams | Margaret Court |
| 1988, 1995 & 1996 | 100% match winning percentage in 1 season | Margaret Court; Billie Jean King; Chris Evert; Monica Seles; Serena Williams |
| 1988, 1995 & 1996 | 100% match winning percentage in 3 separate seasons | **Stands alone** |
| 1983 French Open — 1999 Wimbledon | 89.67% (278–32) match winning percentage overall | **Stands alone** |
| 1988 French Open | Double bagel win in a Grand Slam final | Dorothea Douglass Lambert Chambers; Iga Świątek |
| 1987 French Open — 1995 US Open | 4+ titles at all four Majors | **Stands alone** |
| 1987 French Open — 1989 US Open | 2+ consecutive titles at all four Majors | **Stands alone** |
| 1988 Australian Open — 1996 US Open | 5 calendar years winning 3+ Grand Slam titles | **Stands alone** |
| 1988 French Open — 1989 US Open | Defended all four Majors on first try | **Stands alone** |
| 1987 French Open — 1999 French Open | 6+ titles on clay, grass and hardcourt | **Stands alone** |
| 1987 French Open — 1999 French Open | 9+ finals on clay, grass and hardcourt | **Stands alone** |
| 1987 French Open — 1990 French Open | 13 consecutive Grand Slam finals | **Stands alone** |
| 1999 French Open | Defeated the top 3 seeded players in the same tournament | **Stands alone** |
| 1988 Australian Open — 1993 US Open | Reached the final of all four Grand Slams tournaments in a calendar year | Margaret Court; Chris Evert; Martina Navratilova; Monica Seles; Martina Hingis; Justine Henin |
| 1988 Australian Open — 1993 US Open | Reached the final of all four Grand Slams tournaments in a calendar year three times | **Stands alone** |
| 1988 Australian Open — 1996 US Open | 3 different Grand Slam titles won without losing a set | Chris Evert; Lindsay Davenport; Serena Williams |

| Grand Slam tournaments | Time span | Records at each Grand Slam tournament | Players matched |
|---|---|---|---|
| Australian Open | 1988–1990 | 3 consecutive titles | Margaret Court; Evonne Goolagong Cawley; Monica Seles; Martina Hingis |
| Australian Open | 1988–1989, 1994 | 3 titles won without losing a set | Evonne Goolagong |
| Australian Open—French Open | 1988 | 2 titles won without losing a set in the same calendar year | Billie Jean King; Martina Navratilova; Martina Hingis; Serena Williams; Justine Henin |
| French Open | 1987–1999 | 9 finals overall | Chris Evert |
| French Open | 1987–1990 | 4 consecutive finals | Chris Evert; Martina Navratilova |
| French Open | 1983–1999 | 84 match wins | **Stands alone** |
| Wimbledon | 1984–1999 | **Career match winning performance 91.35% (74–7)** | **Stands alone** |

| Time span | Other selected records | Players matched |
|---|---|---|
| 17 August 1987 — 10 March 1991 | 186 consecutive weeks at No. 1 | Serena Williams |
| 1987–1997 | 377 total weeks at No. 1 | **Stands alone** |
| 1987–1990; 1993–1996 | 8 years ended at No. 1 | **Stands alone** |
| 1988–1990, 1994, 1996 | 5 years as wire-to-wire (all 52 weeks) No. 1 | **Stands alone** |
| 1987, 1989 | Reached the final of every tournament played in a calendar year | Monica Seles |
| 1986–1990; 1992–1996 | Two streaks of 5 years with winning percentage of 90%+ | **Stands alone** |
| 1986–1996 | 9 German Open titles | **Stands alone** |
| 1986–89 & 1991–94 | 4 consecutive German Open title wins | **Stands alone** |
| 1985–1996 | 11 German Open finals | **Stands alone** |
| 1986–1996 | 11 consecutive German Open finals | **Stands alone** |
| 1987–1995 | 6 Virginia Slims of Florida titles | **Stands alone** |
| 1986–1995 | 9 Virginia Slims of Florida finals | **Stands alone** |
| 1992–1995 | 4 consecutive Virginia Slims of Florida titles | **Stands alone** |
| 1990–1998 | 5 Sparkassen Cup titles | **Stands alone** |
| 1986–1992 | 6 Zurich Open titles | **Stands alone** |
| 1987–1993 | 6 WTA Hamburg titles | **Stands alone** |
| 1989–1994 | 4 Southern California Open titles | **Stands alone** |
| 1986–1989 | 3 WTA New Jersey titles | **Stands alone** |
| 1986–1992 | 6 Brighton International titles | **Stands alone** |
| 1988–1998 | 4 Connecticut Open titles | Venus Williams; Caroline Wozniacki |
| 1992–1998 | 3 WTA Philadelphia titles | Lindsay Davenport; Gabriela Sabatini |
| 1986–1990 | 3 Amelia Island titles | Amélie Mauresmo |
| 1988–1996 | 8 WTA Tier 1/Premier-5/Premier Mandatory clay titles | Conchita Martínez |
| 1992–1995 | 89.63% win rate (147–17) in WTA Tier 1/Premier-5/Premier Mandatory events | **Stands alone** |

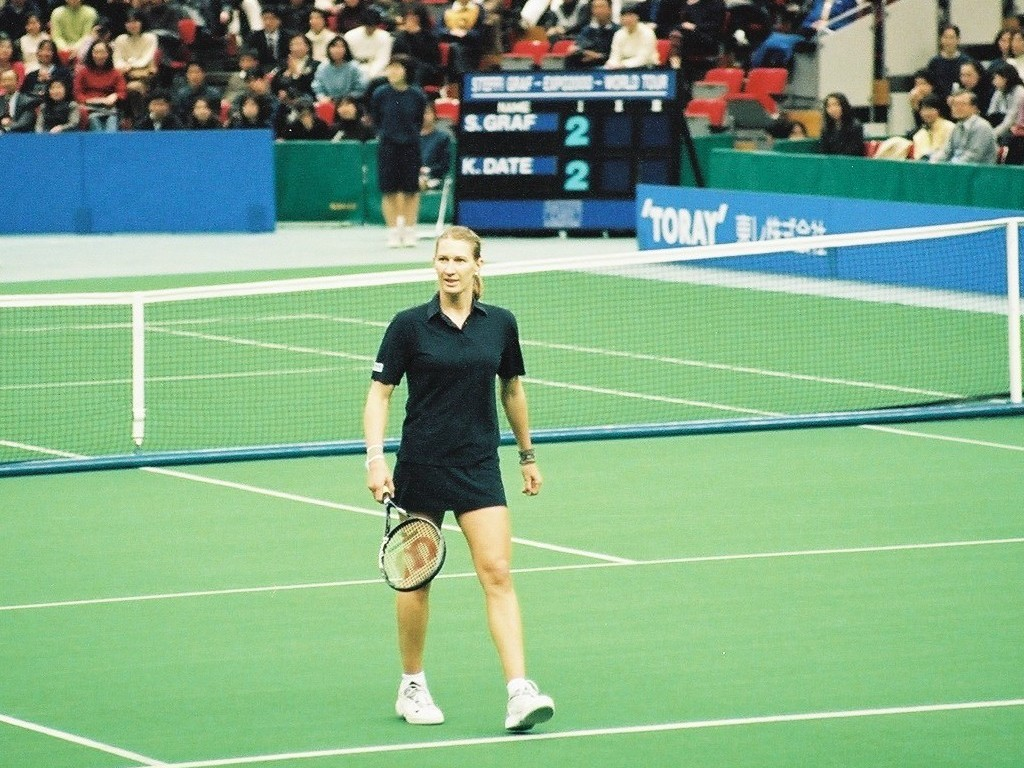
Graf Farewell World Tour 2000

== Playing style ==
The main weapons in Graf's game were her powerful inside-out forehand drive (which earned her the moniker Fräulein Forehand) and her intricate footwork. She often positioned herself in her backhand corner and although this left her forehand wide open and vulnerable to attack, her court speed meant that only the most accurate shots wide to her forehand caused any trouble. Graf's game was versatile across multiple playing surfaces, and she excelled at her footwork and powerful forehand drive.

Graf's technique on the forehand was unique and instantly recognizable: generating considerable racquet head speed with her swing, she reached the point of contact late and typically out of the air. As a result, she hit her forehand with significant pace and accuracy. According to her coaches Pavel Složil and Heinz Günthardt, Graf's timing was the key behind the success of her forehand.

Graf also had a powerful backhand drive but over the course of her career tended to use it less frequently, opting more often for an effective backhand slice. Starting in the early 1990s, she used the slice almost exclusively in baseline rallies and mostly limited the topspin backhand to passing shots. Her accuracy with the slice, both cross-court and down the line and her ability to skid the ball and keep it low, enabled her to use it as an offensive weapon to set the ball up for her forehand put-aways. However, Graf admitted in 1995 that she would have preferred having a two-handed backhand in retrospect.

She built her powerful and accurate serve up to 183 km/h (114 mph), making it one of the fastest serves in women's tennis and was a capable volleyer.

An exceptionally versatile competitor, Graf remains the only player, male or female, to have won the calendar-year Grand Slam on three surfaces or to have won each Grand Slam at least four times. Eighteen-time Grand Slam champion and former rival Chris Evert opined, "Steffi Graf is the best all-around player. Martina [Navratilova] won more on fast courts and I won more on slow courts, but Steffi came along and won more titles on both surfaces." Her endurance and superior footwork allowed her to excel on clay courts, where, in addition to six French Open titles, she won 26 regular tour events, including a record eight titles at the German Open. Meanwhile, her naturally aggressive style of play, effective backhand slice and speed around the court made her even more dominant on fast surfaces such as hard courts, grass and carpet. Graf stated that grass was her favorite surface to play on, while clay was her least favorite.

== Equipment and endorsements ==
Early in her career, Graf wore Dunlop apparel, before signing an endorsement contract with Adidas in 1985. She had an Adidas sneakers line known as the St. Graf Pro line. Early in her career, Graf used the Dunlop Maxpower Pro and Maxpower Kevlar racquets and then played with the Max 200G racquet from 1984 to 1993 before switching to Wilson from 1994 to 1999. She first used the Wilson Pro Staff 7.0 lite, then switched to the Pro Staff 7.5 in 1996 and to the Pro Staff 7.1 in 1998. Graf's racquets were strung at 29 kilograms (64 pounds), significantly above the 50–60 pound range recommended by Wilson. In 2006, she signed an endorsement deal with Head. In 2010, Graf and Agassi collaborated with Head and developed the new line of Star Series tennis racquets.

Graf has signed many endorsement deals throughout the years including a ten-year endorsement deal with car manufacturer Opel in 1985, and Rexona from 1994 to 1998. Other companies she has endorsed include Barilla, Apollinaris, Citibank, Danone and Teekanne. She has appeared in many advertisements and television commercials with Andre Agassi including Canon Inc. and Longines in 2008 (Agassi became Longines ambassador in 2007). In 2015, she was appointed as the brand ambassador of Kerala tourism, for promoting Ayurveda in North America and Europe.

== Personal life ==
In 1997, she left the Catholic Church, citing personal reasons. During her career, Graf divided her time between her hometown of Brühl; Boca Raton, Florida; and New York City, where she owned a penthouse in the former Police Headquarters Building in SoHo.

From 1992 to 1999, Graf dated racing driver Michael Bartels. She started dating Andre Agassi after the 1999 French Open, and they married on 22 October 2001, with only their mothers as witnesses. They have two children: a son, born in 2001; and a daughter, born in 2003. Agassi has said that he and Graf are not pushing their children toward becoming tennis players. The Graf-Agassi family resides in Summerlin, a community in the Las Vegas Valley. Graf's mother and her brother also live there. Her father died from cancer in December 2013.

In 1991, the Steffi Graf Youth Tennis Center in Leipzig was dedicated to her. She is the founder, and chairperson, of "Children for Tomorrow", a non-profit foundation established in 1998 for implementing and developing projects to support children that have been traumatized by war or other crises.

In 2001, Graf indicated that she preferred to be called "Stefanie" instead of "Steffi".

== Legacy ==
In December 1999, Graf was named the greatest woman tennis player of the 20th century by a panel of experts assembled by the Associated Press. Graf was ranked as the world No. 1 in women's singles by the WTA for a record 377 weeks, and finished as the year-end No. 1 a record eight times, and she won 22 major women's singles titles. Graf's athletic ability and aggressive power game played from the baseline have been credited with developing the modern style of play that has come to dominate today's game.

In the year of Graf's retirement, Billie Jean King said, "Steffi [Graf] is definitely the greatest women's tennis player of all time." In March 2012, Tennis Channel picked Graf as the greatest female tennis player ever in their list of 100 greatest tennis players of all time. In November 2018, Tennis.com polled its readers to choose the greatest women's tennis player of all time and Graf came in first. When asked in a 2016 interview to name the greatest players of all time, Serena Williams answered Graf and Roger Federer.

In July 2020, The Guardian polled its readers to determine the greatest female tennis player of the past 50 years, and Graf was the clear favorite, picking up nearly twice as many votes as any other player. Along with Boris Becker, Graf is considered instrumental in popularizing tennis in Germany, where it remains one of the foremost national sports. Tennis writer Steve Flink, in his book The Greatest Tennis Matches of the Twentieth Century, named Graf as the best female player of the 20th century. Flink said in 2020 that the jury was still out on (Serena) Williams as the greatest ever, but Williams' consistency over the long span did not match that of Graf or Navratilova.

== Awards and honours ==
Graf was voted the ITF World Champion in 1987, 1988, 1989, 1990, 1993, 1995 and 1996. She was voted the WTA Player of the Year in 1987, 1988, 1989, 1990, 1993, 1994, 1995, 1996, a record 8 times. She was elected as the German Sportsperson of the Year in 1986, 1987, 1988, 1989 and 1999. Her unprecedented Golden Slam saw her receive the 1988 BBC Overseas Sports Personality of the Year.

In 2004, the Berliner Tennis-Arena was renamed Steffi-Graf-Stadion in honor of Graf.

Graf was inducted into the International Tennis Hall of Fame in 2004 and the German Sports Hall of Fame in 2008.

In 2015, Graf was the recipient of the International Club's Jean Borotra Sportsmanship Award.

In 2022, Graf was an honoree by the Carnegie Corporation of New York's Great Immigrant Award.

== See also ==
- Graf–Navratilova rivalry
- Graf–Sabatini rivalry
- Graf–Seles rivalry
- List of female tennis players
- List of tennis rivalries
- Overall tennis records - women's singles
- Tennis records of the Open Era - women's singles

== Pickleball ==
Graf and her husband both have taken up the sport of Pickleball, playing as doubles partners and singles matches.

Sporting positions
| Preceded by Martina Navratilova; Monica Seles; Monica Seles; Monica Seles; Arantxa Sánchez Vicario; Arantxa Sánchez Vicario; Arantxa Sánchez Vicario ' ' | World No. 1; 17 August 1987 – March 10, 1991; 5 August 1991 – August 11, 1991; 19 August 1991 – September 8, 1991; 7 June 1993 – February 5, 1995; 20 February 1995 – February 26, 1995; 10 April 1995 – May 14, 1995; 12 June 1995 – March 30, 1997 inc. 15 August 1995 – November 3, 1996 (w/ M. Seles) inc. 18 November 1996 – November 24, 1996 (w/ M. Seles) | Succeeded by Monica Seles; Monica Seles; Monica Seles; Arantxa Sánchez Vicario; Arantxa Sánchez Vicario; Arantxa Sánchez Vicario; Martina Hingis ' ' |
Awards and achievements
| Preceded by Cornelia Hanisch | German Sportswoman of the Year; 1986 – 1989 | Succeeded by Katrin Krabbe |
| Preceded by Katja Seizinger | German Sportswoman of the Year; 1999 | Succeeded by Heike Drechsler |
| Preceded by Arantxa Sánchez Vicario | Prince of Asturias Award for Sports; 1999 | Succeeded by Lance Armstrong |
| Preceded by Martina Navratilova | ITF World Champion; 1987–1990 | Succeeded by Monica Seles |
| Preceded by Monica Seles | ITF World Champion; 1993 | Succeeded by Arantxa Sánchez Vicario |
| Preceded by Arantxa Sánchez Vicario | ITF World Champion; 1995–1996 | Succeeded by Martina Hingis |
| Preceded by Heike Drechsler | United Press International; Athlete of the Year; 1987 | Succeeded by Florence Griffith-Joyner |
| Preceded by Martina Navratilova | BBC Overseas Sports Personality of the Year; 1988 | Succeeded by Mike Tyson |
| Preceded by Florence Griffith-Joyner | United Press International; Athlete of the Year; 1989 | Succeeded by Merlene Ottey |
| Preceded by Florence Griffith-Joyner | Associated Press Female Athlete of the Year; 1989 | Succeeded by Beth Daniel |
Records
| Preceded by Martina Navratilova | Most Weeks at World No. 1; 13 May 1996 – | Incumbent |
| Preceded by Martina Navratilova; Chris Evert | Most Career Grand Slam Singles Titles (Open Era); 8 June 1996 –28 January 2017 (shared w/ Serena Williams from 9 July 2016 – 28 January 2017) | Succeeded by Serena Williams |
| Preceded by Margaret Court (1970) | Winning a Grand Slam; 1988 | Most recent |
